= Liang Wenchong =

Chinese professional golfer

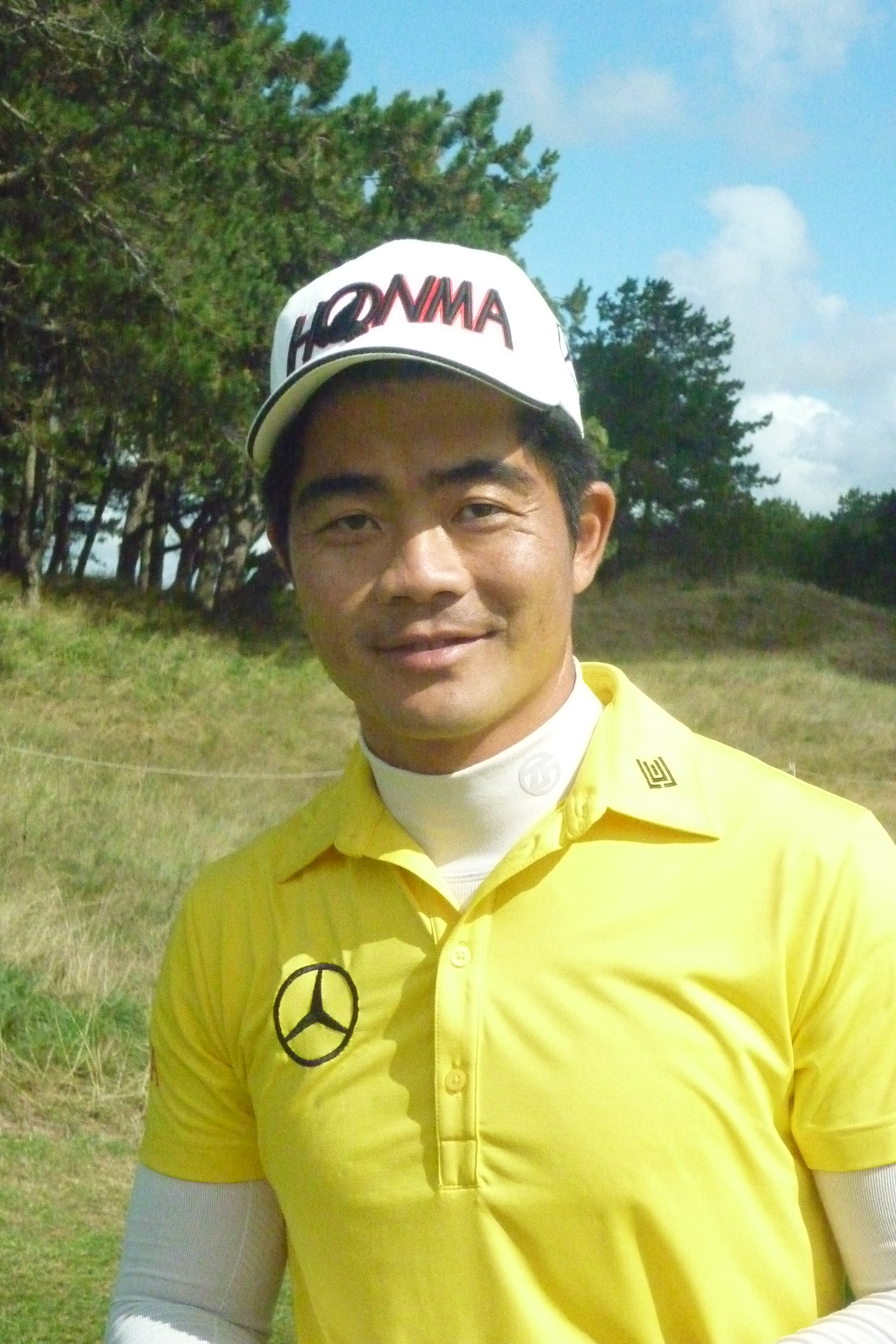

Personal information
- Nationality: China
- Born: 2 August 1978 (age 48) Zhongshan, China
- Height: 5 ft 9 in (1.75 m)
- Weight: 160 lb (73 kg; 11 st)

Career
- Sport: Golf
- Turned professional: 1999
- Current tours: Japan Golf Tour; Asian Tour
- Former tours: European Tour; OneAsia Tour; Omega China Tour
- Professional wins: 21
- Highest ranking: 57 (29 August 2010)

Number of wins by tour
- European Tour: 1
- Japan Golf Tour: 2
- Asian Tour: 3
- Other: 16

Best results in major championships
- Masters Tournament: CUT: 2008
- PGA Championship: T8: 2010
- U.S. Open: CUT: 2014, 2015, 2018
- The Open Championship: T64: 2008

Achievements and awards
- Asian Tour Order of Merit winner: 2007
- Asian Tour Players' Player of the Year: 2007
- OneAsia Tour Order of Merit winner: 2010

Liang Wenchong (simplified Chinese: 梁文冲; traditional Chinese: 梁文沖; pinyin: Liáng Wénchōng, born 2 August 1978) is a Chinese professional golfer. He was the highest ranked golfer from the People's Republic of China and the first Chinese golfer to have reached the top 100 of the Official World Golf Ranking. He succeeded his mentor Zhang Lianwei as the top Chinese player.

== Professional career ==
Liang has played on the Asian Tour, Japan Golf Tour and OneAsia Tour. He finished 21st on the 2006 Japan Golf Tour money list, after finishing second at the Fujisankei Classic. In 2008 he was second at the Japan PGA Championship. At the Asia-Pacific Panasonic Open he finished third in 2008 and second in 2009. In 2014 he finished second at the KBC Augusta.

After more than a dozen top-10 finishes on the Asian Tour, he won the 2007 Clariden Leu Singapore Masters, which was co-sanctioned by the Asian Tour and the European Tour. He was the second golfer from the People's Republic of China to win on the European Tour after Zhang Lianwei. In 2007, Liang won the Order of Merit on the Asian Tour, becoming the first from mainland China to do so.

In 2009, he finished second at the Barclays Singapore Open, a European Tour event. On the 2013 European Tour, he finished third at the Lyoness Open and Avantha Masters.

In August 2007, he became the first golfer from the People's Republic of China to play in the PGA Championship. He ended up missing the cut. He also received a special invitation to play in the 2008 Masters Tournament. In July 2008, Liang became the first Chinese golfer to make the cut at a major, The Open Championship at the Royal Birkdale Golf Club. In August 2010, Liang set a new course record at Whistling Straits with his 8-under 64 in the third round of the 2010 PGA Championship, where he finished eighth.

In 2013, Liang won the Resorts World Manila Masters in the Philippines then donated half of his winner's purse of US$135,000 to victims of Typhoon Haiyan (also known as Typhoon Yolanda) that had recently ravaged the country.

== Amateur wins ==
- 1996 China Amateur Open Championship
- 1997 China Amateur Open Championship
- 1998 China Amateur Open Championship

== Professional wins (21) ==
=== European Tour wins (1) ===
No.	Date	Tournament	Winning score	Margin of victory	Runner-up
1	11 Mar 2007	Clariden Leu Singapore Masters^{1}	−11 (64-72-68-73=277)	Playoff	(Malaysia) Iain Steel

^{1}Co-sanctioned by the Asian Tour

European Tour playoff record (1–0)

No.	Year	Tournament	Opponent	Result
1	2007	Clariden Leu Singapore Masters	(Malaysia) Iain Steel	Won with par on first extra hole

=== Japan Golf Tour wins (2) ===
Legend
Japan majors (1)
Other Japan Golf Tour (1)

No.	Date	Tournament	Winning score	Margin of victory	Runner(s)-up
1	7 Jun 2015	Japan Golf Tour Championship; Mori Building Cup Shishido Hills	−14 (67-68-65-70=270)	5 strokes	(Australia) Brad Kennedy, (Japan) Ryutaro Nagano, (South Korea) Song Young-han
2	16 Apr 2017	Token Homemate Cup	−16 (69-65-66-68=268)	2 strokes	(Japan) Yoshinori Fujimoto

Japan Golf Tour playoff record (0–1)

No.	Year	Tournament	Opponent	Result
1	2014	RZ Everlasting KBC Augusta	(Japan) Hiroyuki Fujita	Lost to par on fifth extra hole

=== Asian Tour wins (3) ===
No.	Date	Tournament	Winning score	Margin of victory	Runner-up
1	11 Mar 2007	Clariden Leu Singapore Masters^{1}	−11 (64-72-68-73=277)	Playoff	(Malaysia) Iain Steel
2	12 Oct 2008	Hero Honda Indian Open	−16 (60-71-71-70=272)	1 stroke	(Australia) Darren Beck
3	17 Nov 2013	Resorts World Manila Masters	−16 (67-69-67-69=272)	Playoff	(Thailand) Prom Meesawat

^{1}Co-sanctioned by the European Tour

Asian Tour playoff record (2–0)

No.	Year	Tournament	Opponent	Result
1	2007	Clariden Leu Singapore Masters	(Malaysia) Iain Steel	Won with par on first extra hole
2	2013	Resorts World Manila Masters	(Thailand) Prom Meesawat	Won with birdie on first extra hole

=== OneAsia Tour wins (4) ===
No.	Date	Tournament	Winning score	Margin of victory	Runner(s)-up
1	18 Oct 2009	Midea China Classic	−14 (69-65-68-68=270)	4 strokes	(China) Zhang Lianwei
2	4 April 2010	Luxehills Chengdu Open	−9 (72-66-67-74=279)	Playoff	(South Korea) Kim Hyung-tae
3	29 Aug 2010	Thailand Open	−18 (67-67-67-69=270)	1 stroke	(Thailand) Namchok Tantipokhakul, (Australia) Michael Wright
4	14 Oct 2012	Nanshan China Masters	−8 (68-67-68-73=276)	Playoff	(South Korea) Yang Yong-eun

OneAsia Tour playoff record (2–0)

No.	Year	Tournament	Opponent	Result
1	2010	Luxehills Chengdu Open	(South Korea) Kim Hyung-tae	Won with birdie on first extra hole
2	2012	Nanshan China Masters	(South Korea) Yang Yong-eun	Won with birdie on fifth extra hole

=== Omega China Tour wins (3) ===
No.	Date	Tournament	Winning score	Margin of victory	Runner-up
1	15 Oct 2005	Zhuhai Leg	−11 (68-66-71=205)	4 strokes	(China) Li Chao
2	9 Apr 2006	Hainan Leg	−15 (72-65-65-71=273)	9 strokes	(China) Zhang Lianwei
3	29 Oct 2006	Omega Golf Championship	−15 (70-68-67-68=273)	12 strokes	(China) Li Chao

=== Other wins (9) ===
- 1999 Kunming Classic (China), Dalian Classic (China), Beijing Classic (China), Shenzhen Classic (China)
- 2000 Shanghai Classic (China), Beijing Classic (China)
- 2001 Shanghai Classic (China), Davidoff Nations Cup (with Zhang Lianwei)
- 2002 Dalian Classic (China)

== Results in major championships ==
Tournament	2007	2008	2009	2010	2011	2012	2013	2014	2015	2016	2017	2018
Masters Tournament		CUT										
U.S. Open								CUT	CUT			CUT
The Open Championship		T64	CUT						CUT			
PGA Championship	CUT			T8	CUT							

Top 10
Did not play

CUT = missed the half-way cut
"T" = tied

== Results in World Golf Championships ==
Results not in chronological order before 2015.

Tournament	2007	2008	2009	2010	2011	2012	2013	2014	2015	2016	2017	2018	2019
Championship		T68		T30									
Match Play													
Invitational	T61								T75				
Champions			T40	T63	T62	T24	T15	T48	T58	T47	T38	T43	T73

Did not play

"T" = tied
Note that the HSBC Champions did not become a WGC event until 2009.

== Team appearances ==
- Alfred Dunhill Cup (representing China): 2000
- World Cup (representing China): 2001, 2007, 2008, 2009, 2011, 2013
- Dynasty Cup (representing Asia): 2003 (winners), 2005 (winners)
- Royal Trophy (representing Asia): 2009 (winners), 2010, 2011, 2013
