= Nico van Rensburg =

South African professional golfer (born 1966)

Personal information
- Full name: Nicholas Marthinus van Rensburg
- Nationality: South Africa
- Born: 24 August 1966 (age 60) Alberton, South Africa
- Height: 1.93 m (6 ft 4 in)

Career
- Sport: Golf
- Turned professional: 1987
- Current tour: Sunshine Tour
- Former tour: Asian Tour
- Professional wins: 9

Number of wins by tour
- Asian Tour: 3
- Sunshine Tour: 3
- Other: 3

Nicholas Marthinus van Rensburg (born 24 August 1966) is a South African professional golfer who currently plays on the Sunshine Tour. He has won on the Sunshine Tour six times between 1989 and 2005. He has three Asian Tour victories as well.

== Early life ==
Van Rensburg was born in Alberton, Gauteng, South Africa.

== Professional career ==
In 1987, Van Rensburg turned professional. He won his first Sunshine Tour event in 1989 and has played consistently on tour ever since.

== Personal life ==
Van Rensburg currently resides in Pretoria with his wife Elmarie and his children Kristoff and Carmen.

== Amateur wins ==
- Colours for Eastern Transvaal and Transvaal
- Highveld Open
- Eastern Transvaal Closed Championship
- Springs Amateur Championship

== Professional wins (9) ==
=== Asian PGA Tour wins (3) ===
No.	Date	Tournament	Winning score	Margin of victory	Runner(s)-up
1	15 Oct 1995	Merlion Masters	−9 (68-69-69-73=279)	1 stroke	(Australia) Don Fardon, (Thailand) Pisit Infasang
2	18 Oct 1998	Kuala Lumpur Open	−6 (70-70-69-69=278)	Playoff	(United States) Jerry Smith
3	29 Aug 1999	Volvo Masters of Malaysia	−18 (69-69-64-68=270)	4 strokes	(Scotland) Simon Yates

Asian PGA Tour playoff record (1–1)

No.	Year	Tournament	Opponent	Result
1	1996	Royal Thai Classic	(South Africa) Richard Kaplan	Lost to birdie on first extra hole
2	1998	Kuala Lumpur Open	(United States) Jerry Smith	Won with birdie on fifth extra hole

=== Sunshine Tour wins (3) ===
No.	Date	Tournament	Winning score	Margin of victory	Runner(s)-up
1	23 Apr 1999	Vodacom Series (Gauteng)	−15 (71-65-65=201)	2 strokes	(Zimbabwe) Don Gammon
2	7 May 2000	Vodacom Series (2) (Gauteng)	−16 (67-65-68=200)	11 strokes	(South Africa) André Cruse, (South Africa) Justin Hobday
3	19 Mar 2005	FNB Botswana Open	−15 (68-66-67=201)	1 stroke	(South Africa) Warren Abery

=== Other wins (3) ===
- 1989 Highveld Classic
- 1993 Royal Swazi Sun Classic
- 1994 Winter Tour Championship
