= Taimur Hussain =

Pakistani professional golfer (born 1974)

Personal information
- Nationality: Pakistan
- Born: 2 February 1974 (age 52) Lahore, Pakistan
- Height: 1.78 m (5 ft 10 in)
- Weight: 88 kg (194 lb; 13.9 st)

Career
- Sport: Golf
- Turned professional: 1995
- Former tours: Asian Tour; Japan Golf Tour
- Professional wins: 3

Number of wins by tour
- Asian Tour: 1

Taimur Hussain (born 2 February 1974) is a Pakistani professional golfer.

== Career ==
In 1998, Hussain became the first Pakistani to win on the Asian Tour when he captured the Myanmar Open.

== Amateur wins ==
- 1995 Nomura Cup

== Professional wins (3) ==
=== Asian PGA Tour wins (1) ===
No.	Date	Tournament	Winning score	Margin of victory	Runner-up
1	8 Mar 1998	London Myanmar Open	−8 (70-73-68-69=280)	1 stroke	(China) Zhang Lianwei

Asian PGA Tour playoff record (0–1)

No.	Year	Tournament	Opponents	Result
1	1999	Lexus International	(Myanmar) Zaw Moe, (India) Jeev Milkha Singh	Singh won with birdie on third extra hole Hussain eliminated by par on first hole

=== Other wins (2) ===
- 1995 Pakistan Open (as an amateur)
- 2001 Pakistan Open
