= Kurt Barnes =

Australian professional golfer

Personal information
- Nationality: Australia
- Born: 25 May 1981 (age 45) Muswellbrook, New South Wales, Australia
- Height: 1.83 m (6 ft 0 in)

Career
- Sport: Golf
- Turned professional: 2003
- Former tours: Japan Golf Tour; PGA Tour of Australasia; OneAsia Tour; Von Nida Tour; Omega China Tour
- Professional wins: 6

Number of wins by tour
- Japan Golf Tour: 1
- Other: 5

Best results in major championships
- Masters Tournament: DNP
- PGA Championship: DNP
- U.S. Open: CUT: 2015
- The Open Championship: CUT: 2010, 2011

Achievements and awards
- Omega China Tour Order of Merit winner: 2009

Kurt Barnes (born 25 May 1981) is an Australian professional golfer.

== Early life and amateur career ==
Barnes was born in Muswellbrook, New South Wales. He had a successful amateur career which included victories in the 2002 Australian Amateur, the 2003 Riversdale Cup, which he won with a record 22 under par total, and the 2003 New Zealand Amateur Stroke Play Championship.

== Professional career ==
In 2003, Barnes turned professional. Shortly thereafter, he joined the PGA Tour of Australasia.

In 2009, Barnes became the first Australian to win on the Omega China Tour, when he claimed victory in the Sofitel Zhongshan IGC Open. He went on to head that tour's Order of Merit that season. He then qualified for the Japan Golf Tour by finishing first at that tour's qualifying school.

== Amateur wins ==
- 2002 New South Wales Medal (tied with Adam Groom), Australian Amateur
- 2003 Riversdale Cup, New Zealand Amateur Stroke Play Championship

== Professional wins (6) ==
=== Japan Golf Tour wins (1) ===
No.	Date	Tournament	Winning score	Margin of victory	Runners-up
1	18 Sep 2011	ANA Open	−13 (71-66-67-71=275)	1 stroke	(Japan) Tomohiro Kondo, (Japan) Shingo Katayama, (Japan) Koumei Oda

=== OneAsia Tour wins (1) ===
No.	Date	Tournament	Winning score	Margin of victory	Runner-up
1	22 May 2011	SK Telecom Open^{1}	−14 (71-64-67=202) (Note: Shortened to 54 holes due to weather.)	1 stroke	(South Korea) Kim Kyung-tae

^{1}Co-sanctioned by the Korean Tour

=== Von Nida Tour wins (2) ===
No.	Date	Tournament	Winning score	Margin of victory	Runner-up
1	14 Nov 2004	Toyota Queensland PGA Championship	−29 (66-64-64-65=259)	1 stroke	(Australia) Gary Simpson
2	30 Jan 2005	Mitsubishi Motors Victorian Open	−12 (65-68-71=204)	Playoff	(Australia) Nathan Green

=== Omega China Tour wins (1) ===
No.	Date	Tournament	Winning score	Margin of victory	Runner-up
1	26 Apr 2009	Sofitel Zhongshan Open	−4 (69-70-73-72=284)	1 stroke	(Thailand) Wisut Artjanawat

=== Other wins (1) ===
- 2005 Meriton Sydney Invitational

== Results in major championships ==
Tournament	2010	2011	2012	2013	2014	2015
Masters Tournament						
U.S. Open						CUT
The Open Championship	CUT	CUT				
PGA Championship						

Did not play

CUT = missed the half-way cut
"T" = tied

== Team appearances ==
Amateur

- Australian Men's Interstate Teams Matches (representing New South Wales): 2002 (winners), 2003
