= Chinnarat Phadungsil =

Thai professional golfer (born 1988)

Personal information
- Full name: Chinnarat Phadungsil
- Nickname: Neung (One)
- Nationality: Thailand
- Born: 1 November 1988 (age 38) Chantaburi, Thailand
- Height: 1.73 m (5 ft 8 in)
- Weight: 80 kg (176 lb; 12 st 8 lb)

Career
- Sport: Golf
- Turned professional: 2005
- Current tour: Asian Tour
- Former tour: European Tour
- Professional wins: 5

Number of wins by tour
- Asian Tour: 3
- Other: 2

Chinnarat Phadungsil (born 1 November 1988) is a Thai professional golfer who plays on the Asian Tour and the European Tour.

== Early life and amateur career ==
Chinnarat was born in Chantaburi, Thailand. As an amateur, he won tournaments in Asia, Australia and the United States. His most notable junior win came at the 15-17 age group event at the Junior World Golf Championships in San Diego, California.

Chinnarat won the 2005 Double A International Open on the Asian Tour at the age of 17 years and five days, becoming the youngest person to win on the Asian Tour. He trailed by five shots going into the final round but forced a playoff with a final round of 67 which included three birdies on the final holes. He defeated Shiv Kapur in a playoff to win the tournament. The win also made him the third amateur to win a professional tournament in Asia.

== Professional career ==
In 2005, Chinnarat turned professional. This announcement was made immediately after his victory at the Double A International Open.

Chinnarat won his second event on the Asian Tour at the 2006 Crowne Plaza Open. He was two shots back with three holes left in the tournament and birdied holes 16 and 18 to force a playoff. He defeated Prom Meesawat and Lin Wen-tang in the playoff. As a rookie on tour, he finished in 29th on the Order of Merit. He almost picked up his third Asian Tour victory at the 2007 Midea China Classic but fell to Thaworn Wiratchant in a playoff. He finished 20th on the Order of Merit in 2007. In 2008 he recorded four top-10 finishes and finished in 38th on the Order of Merit. He earned his European Tour card for 2009 by finished T12 at qualifying school.

Chinnarat won his third event on the Asian Tour at the 2009 Queen's Cup. He entered the final round a stroke behind the leader but a final round of 67 (-4) including three birdies on the last five holes saw him win the tournament by a margin of three strokes.

== Amateur wins ==
- 2001 Asia Pacific Junior Golf Championship
- 2002 Jack Newton Junior Golf Championship (Australia)
- 2003 Sprint International Amateur Golf Championship (USA)
- 2004 Asia Pacific Junior Masters
- 2005 Junior World Golf Championships (Boys 15–17)

== Professional wins (5) ==
=== Asian Tour wins (3) ===
No.	Date	Tournament	Winning score	Margin of victory	Runner(s)-up
1	6 Nov 2005	Double A International Open (as an amateur)	−14 (73-68-70-67=266)	Playoff	(India) Shiv Kapur
2	20 Aug 2006	Crowne Plaza Open	−16 (65-68-68-71=272)	Playoff	(Taiwan) Lin Wen-tang, (Thailand) Prom Meesawat
3	16 Aug 2009	Queen's Cup	−16 (66-65-70-67=268)	3 strokes	(South Korea) Kim Dae-hyun, (Thailand) Udorn Duangdecha, (Japan) Yoshinobu Tsukada

Asian Tour playoff record (2–1)

No.	Year	Tournament	Opponent(s)	Result
1	2005	Double A International Open (as an amateur)	(India) Shiv Kapur	Won with birdie on second extra hole
2	2006	Crowne Plaza Open	(Taiwan) Lin Wen-tang, (Thailand) Prom Meesawat	Won with par on second extra hole Lin eliminated by par on first hole
3	2007	Midea China Classic	(Thailand) Thaworn Wiratchant, (Scotland) Simon Yates	Wiratchant won with birdie on fourth extra hole Yates eliminated by par on first hole

=== Japan Challenge Tour wins (1) ===
No.	Date	Tournament	Winning score	Margin of victory	Runners-up
1	1 Jul 2011	Tokyu Resort Nasu JGTO Challenge	−10 (65-69=134)	1 stroke	(Japan) Takuya Karindo, (Japan) Ryuichi Kondo, (Japan) Katsuhiro Saruta, (Japan) Hidezumi Shirakata

=== All Thailand Golf Tour wins (1) ===
No.	Date	Tournament	Winning score	Margin of victory	Runner-up
1	28 Jun 2015	Singha Open	−10 (68-70-67-73=278)	1 stroke	(Thailand) Pavit Tangkamolprasert

== Results in World Golf Championships ==
Tournament	2011
Match Play	
Championship	
Invitational	
Champions	T38

Did not play

"T" = Tied

== Team appearances ==
Amateur

- Eisenhower Trophy (representing Thailand): 2004
- Putra Cup (representing Thailand): 2004 (winners)

== See also ==
- 2008 European Tour Qualifying School graduates
