= Anthony Kang =

Korean-American professional golfer

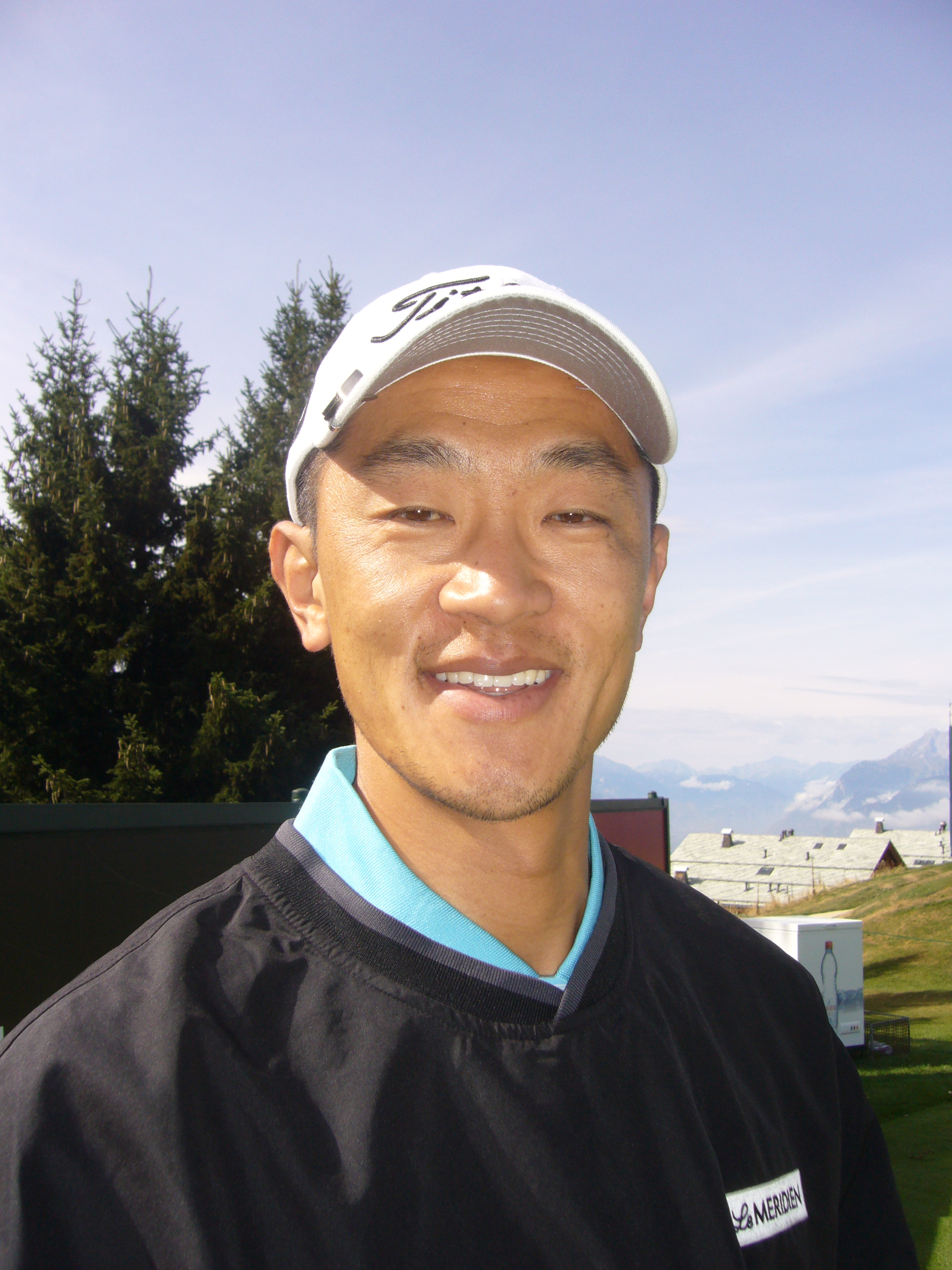

Personal information
- Full name: Anthony Kang
- Nationality: United States
- Born: November 30, 1972 (age 53) South Korea
- Height: 6 ft 1 in (1.85 m)

Career
- Sport: Golf
- College: Oregon State University
- Turned professional: 1996
- Current tour: Asian Tour (joined 1998)
- Former tour: European Tour (2009–11)
- Professional wins: 3

Number of wins by tour
- European Tour: 1
- Asian Tour: 3

Best results in major championships
- Masters Tournament: DNP
- PGA Championship: DNP
- U.S. Open: T74: 2001
- The Open Championship: DNP

Anthony Kang (born November 30, 1972) is a Korean-American professional golfer.

== Early life ==
Kang was born in South Korea, moving to live in the United States at the age of 10, where he attended Oregon State University.

== Professional career ==
Kang turned professional in 1996. He has been a member of the Asian Tour since 1998 where he has won over a million US dollars in prize money.

Kang has had three victories on the Asian Tour, the most recent coming at the 2009 Maybank Malaysian Open, eight years after the previous one. The tournament was co-sanctioned with the European Tour, and the win also gave him a two-year exemption on that tour.

== Professional wins (3) ==
=== European Tour wins (1) ===
No.	Date	Tournament	Winning score	Margin of victory	Runners-up
1	15 Feb 2009	Maybank Malaysian Open^{1}	−17 (74-66-64-67=271)	1 stroke	(England) David Horsey, (Thailand) Prayad Marksaeng, (India) Jyoti Randhawa, (England) Miles Tunnicliff

^{1}Co-sanctioned by the Asian PGA Tour

=== Asian Tour wins (3) ===
No.	Date	Tournament	Winning score	Margin of victory	Runner(s)-up
1	30 May 1999	Casino Filipino Philippine Open	−15 (68-72-67-66=273)	1 stroke	(South Africa) James Kingston, (Japan) Kazuyoshi Yonekura
2	11 Feb 2001	London Myanmar Open	−6 (74-71-71-66=282)	2 strokes	(South Korea) Charlie Wi
3	15 Feb 2009	Maybank Malaysian Open^{1}	−17 (74-66-64-67=271)	1 stroke	(England) David Horsey, (Thailand) Prayad Marksaeng, (India) Jyoti Randhawa, (England) Miles Tunnicliff

^{1}Co-sanctioned by the European Tour

Asian Tour playoff record (0–1)

No.	Year	Tournament	Opponents	Result
1	2000	Volvo Masters of Malaysia	(Japan) Shinichi Akiba, (Sweden) Stephen Lindskog	Lindskog won with birdie on second extra hole

== Results in major championships ==
Tournament	2001
U.S. Open	T74

"T" = Tied
Note: Kang only played in the U.S. Open.

== Results in World Golf Championships ==
Tournament	2009
Match Play	
Championship	
Invitational	T36
Champions	T68

Did not play

"T" = Tied
