= Singapore Masters =

Clariden Leu Singapore Masters
Tournament information
- Location: Singapore
- Established: 2001
- Course: Laguna National Golf and Country Club
- Par: 72
- Length: 7,206 yards (6,589 m)
- Tours: European Tour; Asian Tour
- Format: Stroke play
- Prize fund: €1,000,000
- Month played: February
- Final year: 2007

Tournament record score
- Aggregate: 263 Vijay Singh (2001)
- To par: −21 as above

Final champion
- (China) Liang Wenchong
- Location in Singapore

The Singapore Masters was an annual men's professional golf tournament which was played in Singapore from 2001 to 2007. It was co-sanctioned by the Asian Tour and the European Tour, and was one of many European Tour events established in East Asia since the early 1990s.

There have been two important firsts at the Singapore Masters. At the 2002 event, Arjun Atwal became the first Indian golfer to win on the European Tour, and the following year Zhang Lianwei became the first golfer from the People's Republic of China to do so when he overcame then world number 2 Ernie Els on the final hole. In 2006 the prize fund was $1,000,000, which is one of the smaller purses on the European Tour.

There is also a Singapore Open golf tournament, which is part of the Asian Tour's schedule. It is the Asian Tour's flagship event and carries higher prize money than the Singapore Masters.

The 2008 event was canceled due to failure of finding a sponsor for the event.

== Winners ==
Year	Tours (Note: ASA − Asian Tour; EUR − European Tour.)	Winner	Score	To par	Margin of victory	Runner(s)-up
Singapore Masters
2008	ASA, EUR	Cancelled due to lack of sponsorship				
Clariden Leu Singapore Masters
2007	ASA, EUR	(China) Liang Wenchong	277	−11	Playoff	(Malaysia) Iain Steel
OSIM Singapore Masters
2006	ASA, EUR	(Singapore) Mardan Mamat	276	−12	1 stroke	(England) Nick Dougherty
Caltex Masters presented by Carlsberg
2005	ASA, EUR	(England) Nick Dougherty	270	−18	5 strokes	(Netherlands) Maarten Lafeber (Scotland) Colin Montgomerie
2004	ASA, EUR	(Scotland) Colin Montgomerie	272	−16	3 strokes	(United States) Gregory Hanrahan
2003	ASA, EUR	(China) Zhang Lianwei	278	−10	1 stroke	(South Africa) Ernie Els
Caltex Singapore Masters
2002	ASA, EUR	(India) Arjun Atwal	274	−14	5 strokes	(Australia) Richard Green
2001	ASA, EUR	(Fiji) Vijay Singh	263	−21	2 strokes	(England) Warren Bennett

== See also ==
- Merlion Masters, a golf tournament on the Asian Tour played in Singapore in 1995 and 1996.
- Rolex Masters, a golf tournament played in Singapore from 1973 to 1998.
