= Volvo Masters of Malaysia =

Men's golf tournament

Tournament information
- Location: Kota Kemuning, Malaysia
- Established: 1994
- Courses: Kota Permai Golf and Country Club
- Par: 72
- Length: 6,962 yards (6,366 m)
- Tour: Asian Tour
- Format: Stroke play
- Prize fund: US$275,000
- Month played: August
- Final year: 2001

Tournament record score
- Aggregate: 270 Nico van Rensburg (1999)
- To par: −18 as above

Final champion
- (Thailand) Thaworn Wiratchant
- Location in Malaysia

The Volvo Masters of Malaysia was a men's professional golf tournament which took place in Malaysia. Founded in 1994, it was an Asian Tour event from 1997 to 2001.

== Winners ==
Year	Winner	Score	To par	Margin of victory	Runner(s)-up	Purse (US$)
2001	(Thailand) Thaworn Wiratchant	271	−17	3 strokes	(United States) Scott Kammann	275,000
2000	(Sweden) Stephen Lindskog	278	−10	Playoff	(Japan) Shinichi Akiba (United States) Anthony Kang	250,000
1999	(South Africa) Nico van Rensburg	270	−18	4 strokes	(Scotland) Simon Yates	200,000
1998	(South Africa) Chris Williams	279	−9	Playoff	(Myanmar) Zaw Moe (Australia) Adrian Percey	200,000
1997	(United States) Christian Peña	276	–12	1 stroke	(Taiwan) Hsieh Yu-shu	200,000
1996	(China) Zhang Lianwei (2)					
1995	(China) Zhang Lianwei					
1994	(Malaysia) Periasamy Gunasegaran	281		1 stroke	(Philippines) Danny Zarate	52,730

== See also ==
- Malaysian Dunlop Masters
- Malaysian Masters
- Volvo Masters of Asia
