= Midea China Classic =

Professional golf tournament held in China

Tournament information
- Location: Guangzhou, China
- Established: 2007
- Course: Royal Orchid International Golf Club
- Par: 71
- Length: 6,889 yards (6,299 m)
- Tours: Asian Tour; OneAsia Tour
- Format: Stroke play
- Prize fund: US$1,000,000
- Month played: October
- Final year: 2010

Tournament record score
- Aggregate: 263 Chinnarat Phadungsil (2007); 263 Thaworn Wiratchant (2007); 263 Simon Yates (2007)
- To par: −21 as above

Final champion
- (Australia) Kim Felton
- Location in China

The Midea China Classic is a professional golf tournament held in China. It was first played in 2007 at the Royal Orchid International Golf Club in Guangzhou. The tournament was originally part of the Asian Tour schedule, but became part of the rival OneAsia Tour for its inaugural season in 2009.

== Winners ==
Year	Tour (Note: ASA − Asian Tour; ONE − OneAsia Tour.)	Winner	Score	To par	Margin of victory	Runner(s)-up
2010	ONE	(Australia) Kim Felton	272	−12	2 strokes	(Scotland) Simon Yates
2009	ONE	(China) Liang Wenchong	270	−14	4 strokes	(China) Zhang Lianwei
2008	ASA	(South Korea) Noh Seung-yul	267	−17	1 stroke	(Australia) Terry Pilkadaris
2007	ASA	(Thailand) Thaworn Wiratchant	263	−21	Playoff	(Thailand) Chinnarat Phadungsil (Scotland) Simon Yates
