= Luxehills Chengdu Open =

Tournament information
- Location: Chengdu, China
- Established: 2008
- Course: Luxehills International Country Club
- Par: 72
- Tours: Omega China Tour; OneAsia Tour
- Format: Stroke play
- Prize fund: US$1,000,000
- Month played: April
- Final year: 2010

Tournament record score
- Aggregate: 267 Liang Wenchong (2010)
- To par: −21 as above

Final champion
- (China) Liang Wenchong
- Location in China

The Luxehills Chengdu Open was a professional golf tournament held in China. It was first played in 2008 at the Luxehills International Country Club in Chengdu. The tournament was originally part of the Omega China Tour schedule, before joining the OneAsia Tour in 2010. However, the tournament was not part of the Tour in 2011 and has not been renewed since.

== Winners ==
Year	Tour (Note: OCHN − Omega China Tour; ONE − OneAsia Tour.)	Winner	Score	To par	Margin of victory	Runner-up
Luxehills Chengdu Open
2010	ONE	(China) Liang Wenchong	267	−21	Playoff	(South Korea) Kim Hyung-tae
Luxehills Championship
2009	OCHN	(China) Chen Jian	277	−11	Playoff	(Australia) Rowan Beste
2008	OCHN	(Taiwan) Tsai Chi-huang	270	−18	3 strokes	(China) Liao Guiming
