= Arjun Atwal =

Indian professional golfer (born 1973)

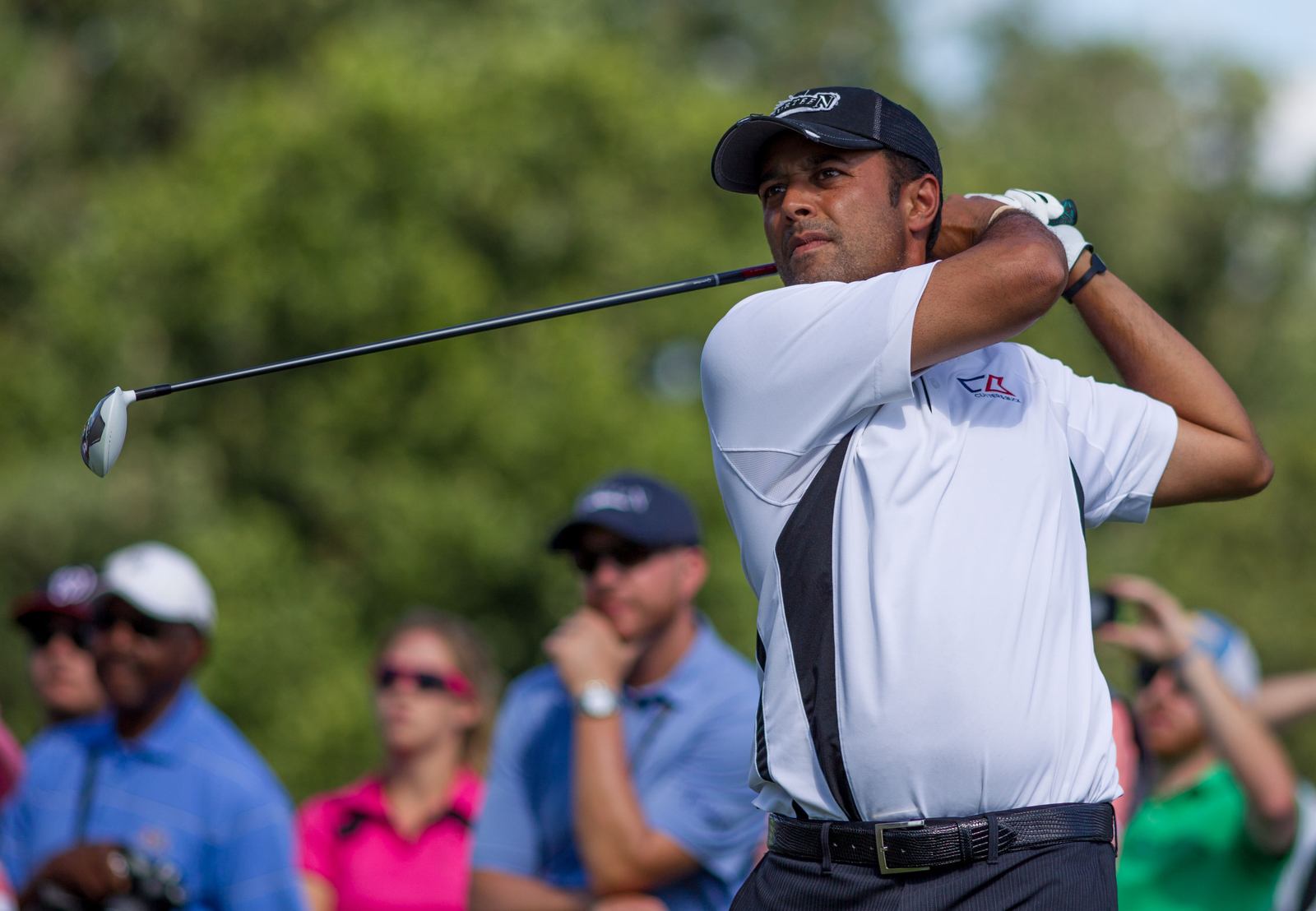
- Atwal in action in 2012

Personal information
- Full name: Arjun Singh Atwal
- Nationality: India
- Born: 20 March 1973 (age 53) Kolkata, India
- Height: 6 ft 1 in (1.85 m)
- Weight: 185 lb (84 kg; 13.2 st)
- Spouse: Sona Atwal (m. 2000)
- Children: 2

Career
- Sport: Golf
- Turned professional: 1995
- Current tours: PGA Tour Champions; Asian Tour
- Former tours: PGA Tour; European Tour; Web.com Tour; Asian Tour
- Professional wins: 13

Number of wins by tour
- PGA Tour: 1
- European Tour: 3
- Asian Tour: 8 (Tied 6th all time)
- Korn Ferry Tour: 1
- Other: 3

Best results in major championships
- Masters Tournament: CUT: 2011
- PGA Championship: CUT: 2005, 2011
- U.S. Open: CUT: 2010
- The Open Championship: CUT: 2004

Achievements and awards
- Asian PGA Tour Rookie of the Year: 1995
- Asian PGA Tour Order of Merit winner: 2003
- Asian PGA Tour Players' Player of the Year: 2003

Arjun Singh Atwal (born 20 March 1973) is an Indian professional golfer who has played on the Asian Tour and the European Tour and is the first player born in India to gain membership of and win on the U.S.-based PGA Tour.

== Early life ==
Atwal was born in a Sikh family to Harminder Singh Atwal, an industrialist from Kolkata, West Bengal, India. He attended St. James' School in Kolkata. At age 14, he took up golf, playing at the Royal Calcutta Golf Club and Tollygunge Club. He also spent two years at school in the United States, attending W. T. Clarke High School, in Westbury, New York, on Long Island.

== Professional career ==
In 1995, Arjun turned professional. He became one of the leading players on the Asian Tour, topping the Order of Merit in 2003. Atwal was the second Indian golfer to earn membership of the European Tour after Jeev Milkha Singh and the first to win; he recorded a five-stroke victory in the 2002 Caltex Singapore Masters. A second European Tour win followed at the Carlsberg Malaysian Open in 2003. Late in the same year Atwal finished seventh at the PGA Tour's qualifying school in the U.S., earning a PGA Tour card for 2004, making him the first Indian golfer to do so. In his 2004 rookie season on the PGA Tour, he finished 142nd on the money list.

In 2005, Atwal came close to winning on the PGA Tour numerous times, most notably at the BellSouth Classic in April. After posting a 64 (the low round for any golfer in the tournament) in the final round of the rain-shortened event, he wound up in a five-man sudden death playoff along with Rich Beem, José María Olazábal, Brandt Jobe and Phil Mickelson. On the first hole of the playoff, the par-5 18th, Atwal's second shot went into the water, yet he almost holed his fourth shot. If he had done so, he would have made birdie and won (Mickelson, Beem and Olazabal made pars, while Jobe bogeyed.) After two-putting the green, Atwal made bogey, and he and Jobe were eliminated. Mickelson went on to win the tournament. Atwal finished 82nd on the money list in 2005 to secure his spot on Tour for 2006.

After the 2010 RBC Canadian Open, Atwal lost his PGA Tour card after his medical exemption, received due to a shoulder injury, ran out and he had failed to earn enough money. He later regained his playing privileges on the PGA Tour through 2012 and obtained an invitation into the 2011 Masters Tournament by Monday qualifying for and later recording his maiden victory on the PGA Tour at the Wyndham Championship, the final tournament of the regular season. He became the first Indian-born player to ever win on the PGA Tour, and was the first Monday qualifier to win a PGA Tour event since Fred Wadsworth won the 1986 Southern Open. Because he had lost his tour card, he received no FedEx Cup points for his victory and had not earned enough points previously to make the playoffs. He has been a neighbour and practice partner of Tiger Woods for five years at home in Florida.

After failing to qualify for the FedEx Cup in 2010, Atwal entered the 2011 playoff series 123rd. Atwal had only two top-10 finishes in the two years after his win and lost his Tour card after the 2012 season. In 2014, Atwal had his first win in four years at the Dubai Open on the Asian Tour. The win earned Atwal a two-year exemption on the Asian Tour.

== Personal life ==
Atwal was involved in a crash possibly associated with street racing on SR 535, in Windermere, Florida, on 10 March 2007, according to the Florida Highway Patrol. Atwal was not injured, and after a year of investigation, the case was closed with no charges filed. A second driver, John Noah Park, 48, was killed in the incident.

== Professional wins (13) ==
=== PGA Tour wins (1) ===
No.	Date	Tournament	Winning score	Margin of victory	Runner-up
1	22 Aug 2010	Wyndham Championship	−20 (61-67-65-67=260)	1 stroke	(United States) David Toms

PGA Tour playoff record (0–1)

No.	Year	Tournament	Opponents	Result
1	2005	BellSouth Classic	(United States) Rich Beem, (United States) Brandt Jobe, (United States) Phil Mickelson, (Spain) José María Olazábal	Mickelson won with birdie on fourth extra hole Olazábal eliminated by par on third hole Atwal and Jobe eliminated by par on first hole

=== European Tour wins (3) ===
No.	Date	Tournament	Winning score	Margin of victory	Runner(s)-up
1	24 Feb 2002	Caltex Singapore Masters^{1}	−14 (70-69-67-68=274)	5 strokes	(Australia) Richard Green
2	23 Feb 2003	Carlsberg Malaysian Open^{1}	−24 (62-65-67-66=260)	4 strokes	(South Africa) Retief Goosen, (Australia) Brad Kennedy
3	9 Mar 2008	Maybank Malaysian Open^{1} (2)	−18 (70-68-68-64=270)	Playoff	(Sweden) Peter Hedblom

^{1}Co-sanctioned by the Asian Tour

European Tour playoff record (1–1)

No.	Year	Tournament	Opponent	Result
1	2008	Maybank Malaysian Open	(Sweden) Peter Hedblom	Won with par on second extra hole
2	2017	AfrAsia Bank Mauritius Open	(South Africa) Dylan Frittelli	Lost to birdie on first extra hole

=== Asian Tour wins (8) ===
No.	Date	Tournament	Winning score	Margin of victory	Runner(s)-up
1	14 Mar 1999	Wills Indian Open	−12 (72-68-66-70=276)	4 strokes	(India) Shiv Chawrasia, (South Korea) Kang Wook-soon, (Thailand) Prayad Marksaeng
2	5 Nov 2000	Hero Honda Masters	−18 (68-68-68-66=270)	2 strokes	(England) Simon Dyson
3	12 Nov 2000	Star Alliance Open	−12 (65-63-68-72=268)	2 strokes	(Taiwan) Yeh Wei-tze
4	24 Feb 2002	Caltex Singapore Masters^{1}	−14 (70-69-67-68=274)	5 strokes	(Australia) Richard Green
5	23 Feb 2003	Carlsberg Malaysian Open^{1}	−24 (62-65-67-66=260)	4 strokes	(South Africa) Retief Goosen, (Australia) Brad Kennedy
6	11 Nov 2003	Hero Honda Masters (2)	−7 (69-71-70-71=281)	1 stroke	(Mexico) Pablo del Olmo, (India) Jyoti Randhawa, (United States) Gary Rusnak
7	9 Mar 2008	Maybank Malaysian Open^{1} (2)	−18 (70-68-68-64=270)	Playoff	(Sweden) Peter Hedblom
8	21 Dec 2014	Dubai Open	−16 (73-65-68-66=272)	1 stroke	(South Korea) Wang Jeung-hun

^{1}Co-sanctioned by the European Tour

Asian Tour playoff record (1–1)

No.	Year	Tournament	Opponent	Result
1	2008	Maybank Malaysian Open	(Sweden) Peter Hedblom	Won with par on second extra hole
2	2017	AfrAsia Bank Mauritius Open	(South Africa) Dylan Frittelli	Lost to birdie on first extra hole

=== Nationwide Tour wins (1) ===
No.	Date	Tournament	Winning score	Margin of victory	Runner-up
1	19 Oct 2008	Chattanooga Classic	−24 (66-60-66-72=264)	Playoff	(United States) Webb Simpson

Nationwide Tour playoff record (1–0)

No.	Year	Tournament	Opponent	Result
1	2008	Chattanooga Classic	(United States) Webb Simpson	Won with birdie on first extra hole

=== Other wins (3) ===
- 1995 DCM Open
- 1997 Classic Southern India Open
- 2000 Wills Eastern Open

== Results in major championships ==
Tournament	2004	2005	2006	2007	2008	2009	2010	2011
Masters Tournament								CUT
U.S. Open							CUT	
The Open Championship	CUT							
PGA Championship		CUT						CUT

Did not play

CUT = missed the half-way cut

== Results in The Players Championship ==
Tournament	2006	2007	2008	2009	2010	2011	2012
The Players Championship	CUT					T57	CUT

Did not play

CUT = missed the half-way cut
"T" indicates a tie for a place.

== Results in World Golf Championships ==
Tournament	2003	2004	2005	2006	2007	2008	2009	2010	2011
Match Play									
Championship	T48	T43							
Invitational									T63
Champions								T48	

Did not play

"T" indicates a tie for a place.
Note that the HSBC Champions did not become a WGC event until 2009.

== Team appearances ==
Professional

- Dynasty Cup (representing Asia): 2003 (winners)
- World Cup (representing India): 2005
- Royal Trophy (representing Asia): 2006
- EurAsia Cup (representing Asia): 2018 (non-playing captain)

== See also ==
- 2003 PGA Tour Qualifying School graduates
- 2008 Nationwide Tour graduates
- List of golfers with most Asian Tour wins
