= 2003 Asian PGA Tour =

Golf tour season

2003 Asian PGA Tour season
- Duration: 19 December 2002 – 14 December 2003
- Number of official events: 18
- Most wins: (India) Arjun Atwal (2) (China) Zhang Lianwei (2)
- Order of Merit: (India) Arjun Atwal
- Players' Player of the Year: (India) Arjun Atwal
- Rookie of the Year: (Australia) Marcus Both

The 2003 Asian PGA Tour, titled as the 2003 Davidoff Tour for sponsorship reasons, was the ninth season of the Asian PGA Tour, the main professional golf tour in Asia (outside of Japan) since it was established in 1995.

It was the fifth season of the tour under a title sponsorship agreement with Davidoff, that was announced in May 1999.

== Schedule ==
The following table lists official events during the 2003 season.

Date	Tournament	Host country	Purse (US$)	Winner (Note: The number in brackets after each winner's name is the number of Asian PGA Tour events they had won up to and including that tournament. This information is only shown for Asian PGA Tour members.)	OWGR points	Other tours (Note: ANZ − PGA Tour of Australasia; EUR − European Tour; JPN − Japan Golf Tour; KOR − Korean Tour.)	Notes
22 Dec	Asia Japan Okinawa Open	Japan	¥100,000,000	(Japan) Hiroyuki Fujita (n/a)	12	JPN	New to Asian PGA Tour
26 Jan	Caltex Masters	Singapore	900,000	(China) Zhang Lianwei (5)	20	EUR	
16 Feb	Johnnie Walker Classic	Australia	£1,000,000	(South Africa) Ernie Els (n/a)	44	ANZ, EUR	
23 Feb	Carlsberg Malaysian Open	Malaysia	1,100,000	(India) Arjun Atwal (5)	20	EUR	
2 Mar	Myanmar Open	Myanmar	200,000	(Taiwan) Lin Keng-chi (5)	6		
30 Mar	Royal Challenge Indian Open	India	300,000	(United States) Mike Cunning (1)	6		
6 Apr	Thailand Open	Thailand	150,000	(United States) Edward Loar (1)	6		
4 May	Maekyung Open	South Korea	₩500,000,000	(South Korea) Chung Joon (1)	6	KOR	
29 Jun	SK Telecom Open	South Korea	₩500,000,000	(South Korea) K. J. Choi (2)	6	KOR	
14 Sep	Mercuries Taiwan Masters	Taiwan	300,000	(Taiwan) Lin Wen-ko (1)	6		
12 Oct	Kolon Korea Open	South Korea	₩500,000,000	(United States) John Daly (n/a)	6	KOR	
19 Oct	Macau Open	Macau	250,000	(Scotland) Colin Montgomerie (n/a)	6		
26 Oct	Sanya Open	China	200,000	(Australia) Marcus Both (1)	6		New tournament
9 Nov	Hero Honda Masters	India	300,000	(India) Arjun Atwal (6)	6		
16 Nov	Volvo China Open	China	500,000	(China) Zhang Lianwei (6)	6		
23 Nov	Acer Taiwan Open	Taiwan	300,000	(Australia) Jason Dawes (1)	6		
7 Dec	Omega Hong Kong Open	Hong Kong	700,000	(Republic of Ireland) Pádraig Harrington (n/a)	26	EUR	
14 Dec	Volvo Masters of Asia	Malaysia	500,000	(Thailand) Thongchai Jaidee (4)	20		

== Order of Merit ==
The Order of Merit was based on prize money won during the season, calculated in U.S. dollars.

Position	Player	Prize money ($)
1	(India) Arjun Atwal	284,019
2	(China) Zhang Lianwei	254,870
3	(Thailand) Thongchai Jaidee	228,787
4	(Thailand) Thaworn Wiratchant	156,074
5	(Australia) Brad Kennedy	128,809

== Awards ==
Award	Winner	Ref.
Players' Player of the Year	(India) Arjun Atwal	
Rookie of the Year	(Australia) Marcus Both	
