= Hero Honda Masters =

Tournament information
- Location: New Delhi, India
- Established: 1997
- Course: Delhi Golf Club
- Par: 72
- Length: 6,751 yards (6,173 m)
- Tour: Asian Tour
- Format: Stroke play
- Prize fund: US$300,000
- Month played: November
- Final year: 2003

Tournament record score
- Aggregate: 270 Arjun Atwal (2000)
- To par: −18 as above

Final champion
- (India) Arjun Atwal
- Location in India Location in Delhi

The Hero Honda Masters was a professional golf tournament on the Asian Tour from 1997 to 2003.

In 2000 and 2003 it was hosted by the Delhi Golf Club and won by Arjun Atwal.

== Winners ==
Year	Winner	Score	To par	Margin of victory	Runner(s)-up
2003	(India) Arjun Atwal (2)	281	−7	1 stroke	(Mexico) Pablo del Olmo (India) Jyoti Randhawa (United States) Gary Rusnak
2002	(India) Harmeet Kahlon	277	−7	1 stroke	(Thailand) Prayad Marksaeng (United States) James Oh (Thailand) Thammanoon Sriroj
2001: No tournament
2000	(India) Arjun Atwal	270	−18	2 strokes	(England) Simon Dyson
1999	(India) Jyoti Randhawa (2)	277	−11	1 stroke	(South Africa) Sammy Daniels
1998	(India) Jyoti Randhawa	275	−13	4 strokes	(India) Jeev Milkha Singh
1997	(United States) Ted Purdy	277	−11	1 stroke	(India) Gaurav Ghei
