= Musee Platinum Open =

Tournament information
- Location: Miki, Hyōgo, Japan
- Established: 2015
- Course: Japan Memorial Golf Club
- Par: 71
- Length: 7,012 yards (6,412 m)
- Tour: Japan Golf Tour
- Format: Stroke play
- Prize fund: ¥100,000,000
- Month played: July
- Final year: 2015

Tournament record score
- Aggregate: 264 Kim Kyung-tae (2015)
- To par: −20 as above

Final champion
- (South Korea) Kim Kyung-tae
- Location in Japan Location in the Hyōgo Prefecture

The Musee Platinum Open was a professional golf tournament on the Japan Golf Tour. It was played just once, in 2015 at Japan Memorial Golf Club near Miki, Hyōgo Prefecture with a prize fund of ¥100 million.

== Winners ==
Year	Winner	Score	To par	Margin of victory	Runners-up	Winner's share (¥)	Purse (¥)
2015	(South Korea) Kim Kyung-tae	264	−20	1 stroke	(South Korea) Cho Min-gyu (Australia) Brad Kennedy (South Korea) Park Jae-bum	20,000,000	100,000,000
