= Kim Kyung-tae =

South Korean professional golfer

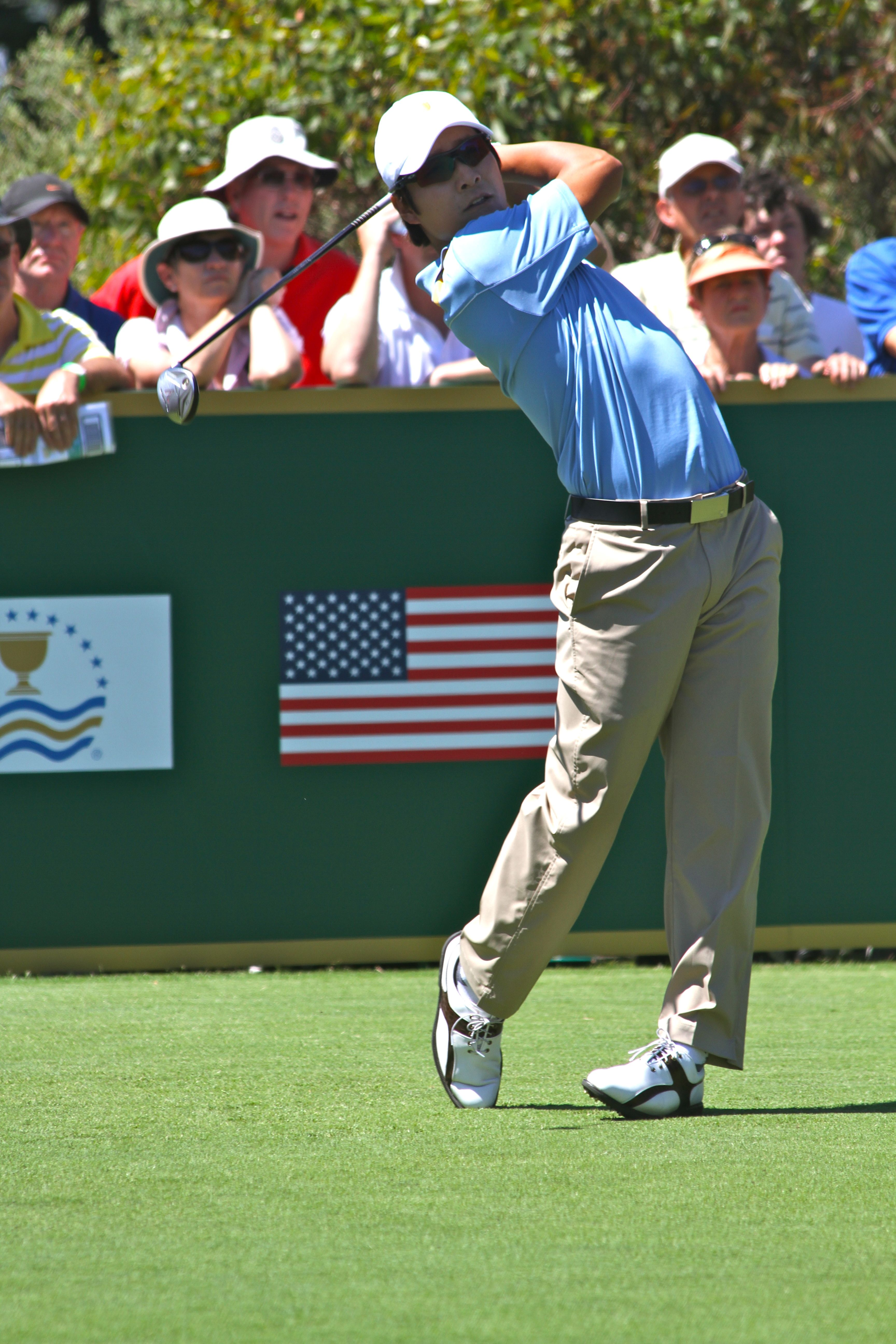
- Kim at the 2011 Presidents Cup

Personal information
- Nationality: South Korea
- Born: 2 September 1986 (age 40) Gangwon Province, South Korea
- Height: 1.77 m (5 ft 10 in)
- Weight: 74 kg (163 lb; 11.7 st)

Career
- Sport: Golf
- College: Yonsei University
- Turned professional: 2006
- Current tours: Japan Golf Tour; Korean Tour
- Former tours: Asian Tour; OneAsia Tour
- Professional wins: 20
- Highest ranking: 18 (7 August 2011)

Number of wins by tour
- Japan Golf Tour: 14
- Asian Tour: 2
- Other: 5

Best results in major championships
- Masters Tournament: T44: 2011
- PGA Championship: T48: 2010
- U.S. Open: T30: 2011
- The Open Championship: T48: 2010

Achievements and awards
- Korean Tour Order of Merit winner: 2007
- Korean Tour Player of the Year: 2007
- Korean Tour Rookie of the Year: 2007
- Japan Golf Tour money list winner: 2010, 2015
- Japan Golf Tour Most Valuable Player: 2015
Medal record
Asian Games
Gold medal – first place	2006 Doha	Men's individual
Gold medal – first place	2006 Doha	Men's team

Kim Kyung-tae (Korean: 김경태; born 2 September 1986), also known as K.T. Kim, is a South Korean professional golfer who currently plays on the Japan Golf Tour and the Korean Tour.

== Career ==
He won several tournaments as an amateur, including the 2006 Japan Amateur Championship and two events on the 2006 Korean Tour. He turned professional in late 2006 and won the 2007 Maekyung Open in his second start on the Asian Tour.

In 2010, Kim won the Diamond Cup Golf, Japan Open and Mynavi ABC Championship on the Japan Golf Tour and became the first Korean golfer to lead the money list on the Tour.

Kim has played in each of the four major championships, recording top-50 finishes in each, with his best being a T30 finish at the 2011 U.S. Open. He also played in the 2011 Presidents Cup, representing the International Team in a 15–19 defeat to USA. Kim finished with a 2–2–0 record.

Kim won five events during the 2015 Japan Golf Tour season, which at the time took his overall total to ten tournament victories on the tour. This being a record for Korean players on the tour. He won a further three events during the 2016 season, including The Crowns, to take his number of Asian Tour victories to thirteen.

== Amateur wins ==
- 2006 Asian Games (individual winner), Korean Amateur Championship, Japan Amateur Championship

== Professional wins (20) ==
=== Japan Golf Tour wins (14) ===
Legend
Flagship events (1)
Japan majors (1) (Note: The 2010 Japan Open Golf Championship was also a Japan major championship.)
Other Japan Golf Tour (13)

No.	Date	Tournament	Winning score	Margin of victory	Runner(s)-up
1	30 May 2010	Diamond Cup Golf	−16 (65-68-68-71=272)	2 strokes	(Japan) Koumei Oda
2	17 Oct 2010	Japan Open Golf Championship	−13 (69-70-68-64=271)	2 strokes	(Japan) Hiroyuki Fujita
3	31 Oct 2010	Mynavi ABC Championship	−13 (67-70-70-69=275)	1 stroke	(Japan) Ryo Ishikawa
4	24 Jul 2011	Nagashima Shigeo Invitational Sega Sammy Cup	−15 (67-70-68-68=273)	4 strokes	(Japan) Ryo Ishikawa
5	2 Sep 2012	Fujisankei Classic	−8 (70-70-68-68=276)	1 stroke	(Japan) Yuta Ikeda
6	14 Jun 2015	Singha Corporation Thailand Open^{1}	−21 (71-64-67-65=267)	3 strokes	(South Korea) Wang Jeung-hun
7	12 Jul 2015	Musee Platinum Open	−20 (68-67-63-66=264)	1 stroke	(South Korea) Cho Min-gyu, (Australia) Brad Kennedy, (South Korea) Park Jae-bum
8	6 Sep 2015	Fujisankei Classic	−9 (70-64-68-73=275)	1 stroke	(South Korea) Lee Kyoung-hoon
9	27 Sep 2015	Asia-Pacific Diamond Cup Golf^{2} (2)	−9 (67-69-67-68=271)	3 strokes	(Japan) Yuta Ikeda, (Japan) Toshinori Muto
10	1 Nov 2015	Mynavi ABC Championship (2)	−12 (66-69-68-69=272)	2 strokes	(Japan) Daisuke Kataoka, (Australia) Won Joon Lee, (Japan) Katsumasa Miyamoto
11	17 Apr 2016	Token Homemate Cup	−13 (68-67-67-69=271)	Playoff	(Japan) Tomohiro Kondo
12	1 May 2016	The Crowns	−10 (69-69-65-67=270)	Playoff	(Japan) Daisuke Kataoka
13	29 May 2016	Gateway to The Open Mizuno Open	−11 (69-64-71-73=277)	1 stroke	(Japan) Kodai Ichihara, (Japan) Shugo Imahira, (South Korea) Lee Sang-hee
14	1 Dec 2019	Casio World Open	−20 (70-68-66-64=268)	2 strokes	(South Africa) Shaun Norris

^{1}Co-sanctioned by the OneAsia Tour
^{2}Co-sanctioned by the Asian Tour

Japan Golf Tour playoff record (2–1)

No.	Year	Tournament	Opponent	Result
1	2009	Golf Nippon Series JT Cup	(Japan) Shigeki Maruyama	Lost to par on fourth extra hole
2	2016	Token Homemate Cup	(Japan) Tomohiro Kondo	Won with birdie on first extra hole
3	2016	The Crowns	(Japan) Daisuke Kataoka	Won with par on first extra hole

=== Asian Tour wins (2) ===
No.	Date	Tournament	Winning score	Margin of victory	Runner(s)-up
1	6 May 2007	GS Caltex Maekyung Open^{1}	−18 (70-66-67-67=270)	4 strokes	(China) Liang Wenchong
2	27 Sep 2015	Asia-Pacific Diamond Cup Golf^{2}	−9 (67-69-67-68=271)	3 strokes	(Japan) Yuta Ikeda, (Japan) Toshinori Muto

^{1}Co-sanctioned by the Korean Tour
^{2}Co-sanctioned by the Japan Golf Tour

=== OneAsia Tour wins (2) ===
No.	Date	Tournament	Winning score	Margin of victory	Runner(s)-up
1	8 May 2011	GS Caltex Maekyung Open^{1}	−21 (67-68-66-66=267)	8 strokes	(South Korea) Cho Min-gyu, (South Korea) Kim Hyung-sung
2	14 Jun 2015	Singha Corporation Thailand Open^{2}	−21 (71-64-67-65=267)	3 strokes	(South Korea) Wang Jeung-hun

^{1}Co-sanctioned by the Korean Tour
^{2}Co-sanctioned by the Japan Golf Tour

=== Korean Tour wins (6) ===
No.	Date	Tournament	Winning score	Margin of victory	Runner(s)-up
1	28 May 2006	Pocari Energy Open (as an amateur)	−8 (68-69-74-69=280)	Playoff	(United States) Han Lee, (South Korea) Suk Jong-yul
2	10 Sep 2006	SBS Samsung Benest Open (as an amateur)	−14 (69-68-69-68=274)	1 stroke	(Australia) Won Joon Lee
3	29 Apr 2007	SBS Tomato Savings Bank Open	−1 (73-69-72-73=287)	1 stroke	(South Korea) Choi Gwang-soo, (South Korea) Gong Young-joon
4	6 May 2007	GS Caltex Maekyung Open^{1}	−18 (70-66-67-67=270)	4 strokes	(China) Liang Wenchong
5	12 Jul 2007	SBS Samsung Apple City Open	−12 (65-68-67-72=272)	5 strokes	(South Korea) Mo Joong-kyung
6	8 May 2011	GS Caltex Maekyung Open^{2} (2)	−21 (67-68-66-66=267)	8 strokes	(South Korea) Cho Min-gyu, (South Korea) Kim Hyung-sung

^{1}Co-sanctioned by the Asian Tour
^{2}Co-sanctioned by the OneAsia Tour

Korean Tour playoff record (1–0)

No.	Year	Tournament	Opponents	Result
1	2006	Pocari Energy Open (as an amateur)	(United States) Han Lee, (South Korea) Suk Jong-yul	Won with birdie on second extra hole Suk eliminated by birdie on first hole

== Results in major championships ==
Tournament	2010	2011	2012	2013	2014	2015	2016	2017
Masters Tournament		T44	CUT					
U.S. Open		T30	67				CUT	
The Open Championship	T48	CUT	CUT	T73			T53	T62
PGA Championship	T48	T59	61				CUT	T67

Did not play

CUT = missed the half-way cut
"T" = tied for place

=== Summary ===
Tournament	Wins	2nd	3rd	Top-5	Top-10	Top-25	Events	Cuts made
Masters Tournament	0	0	0	0	0	0	2	1
U.S. Open	0	0	0	0	0	0	3	2
The Open Championship	0	0	0	0	0	0	6	4
PGA Championship	0	0	0	0	0	0	5	4
Totals	0	0	0	0	0	0	16	11

- Most consecutive cuts made – 4 (2010 Open Championship – 2011 U.S. Open)
- Longest streak of top-10s – 0

== Results in World Golf Championships ==
Results not in chronological order prior to 2015.

Tournament	2010	2011	2012	2013	2014	2015	2016	2017
Championship		T49	T51				T42	76
Match Play		R64	R64					T17
Invitational		T6	T24				T21	
Champions	T41	T49				T27	T47	

Top 10
Did not play

QF, R16, R32, R64 = Round in which player lost in match play
"T" = tied
Note that the HSBC Champions did not become a WGC event until 2009.

== Team appearances ==
Amateur

- Eisenhower Trophy (representing South Korea): 2004, 2006
- Bonallack Trophy (representing Asia/Pacific): 2004 (winners), 2006

Professional

- Presidents Cup (representing the International team): 2011
- Royal Trophy (representing Asia): 2011, 2012 (winners), 2013
- EurAsia Cup (representing Asia): 2016
- World Cup (representing South Korea): 2016

== See also ==
- List of golfers with most Japan Golf Tour wins
