= Higaki =

Higaki (written: 桧垣) is a Japanese surname. Notable people with the surname include:

- Go Higaki (桧垣 豪, born 1976), Japanese golfer
- Shigemasa Higaki (桧垣 繁正, born 1971), Japanese golfer
