= 2016 All Thailand Golf Tour =

Golf tour season

2016 All Thailand Golf Tour season
- Duration: 24 March 2016 – 25 December 2016
- Number of official events: 10
- Most wins: (Thailand) Saranporn Langkulgasettrin (3)
- Order of Merit (men): (Thailand) Udorn Duangdecha
- Order of Merit (women): (Thailand) Saranporn Langkulgasettrin

The 2016 All Thailand Golf Tour, titled as the 2016 Singha All Thailand Golf Tour for sponsorship reasons, was the 18th season of the All Thailand Golf Tour (formerly the TPC Tour), one of the main professional golf tours in Thailand since it was formed in 1999.

== Schedule ==
The following tables list official events during the 2016 season.

=== Men's events ===
| Date | Tournament | Location | Purse (฿) | Winner (Note: The number in brackets after each winner's name is the number of All Thailand Golf Tour events they had won up to and including that tournament.) | OWGR points | Other tours (Note: ADT − Asian Development Tour; ASEAN − ASEAN PGA Tour.) |
|---|---|---|---|---|---|---|
| 27 Mar | Singha E-San Open | Khon Kaen | 3,000,000 | (Thailand) Phachara Khongwatmai (3) | n/a | ASEAN |
| 8 May | Singha Hua Hin Open | Prachuap Khiri Khan | 2,000,000 | (Thailand) Prayad Marksaeng (17) | n/a | ASEAN |
| 22 May | Singha Classic | Nakhon Nayok | 2,000,000 | (Thailand) Jazz Janewattananond (2) | n/a | |
| 5 Jun | Singha Championship | Rayong | 2,000,000 | (Thailand) Namchok Tantipokhakul (2) | n/a | |
| 17 Jul | Singha Pattaya Open | Chonburi | 3,000,000 | (Thailand) Sarit Suwannarat (a) (1) | n/a | ASEAN |
| 7 Aug | Singha Chiang Mai Open | Chiang Mai | 2,000,000 | (Thailand) Prayad Marksaeng (18) | n/a | |
| 28 Aug | All Thailand Premier Championship | Khon Kaen | 3,000,000 | (Thailand) Udorn Duangdecha (4) | n/a | |
| 11 Sep | Singha Panasonic All Thailand Championship | Chonburi | 3,000,000 | (Thailand) Thanyakon Khrongpha (1) | n/a | |
| 4 Dec | Thongchai Jaidee Foundation | Prachuap Khiri Khan | 4,000,000 | (Thailand) Chapchai Nirat (4) | 7 | ADT |
| 25 Dec | Boonchu Ruangkit Championship | Nakhon Ratchasima | 3,000,000 | (Thailand) Danthai Boonma (1) | 9 | ADT |

=== Women's events ===
| Date | Tournament | Location | Purse (฿) | Winner |
|---|---|---|---|---|
| 27 Mar | Singha E-San Open | Khon Kaen | 200,000 | (Thailand) Pajaree Anannarukarn (a) (1) |
| 8 May | Singha Hua Hin Open | Prachuap Khiri Khan | 200,000 | (Thailand) Saraporn Chamchoi (1) |
| 22 May | Singha Classic | Nakhon Nayok | 200,000 | (Thailand) Saranporn Langkulgasettrin (3) |
| 5 Jun | Singha Championship | Rayong | 200,000 | (Thailand) Saranporn Langkulgasettrin (4) |
| 17 Jul | Singha Pattaya Open | Chonburi | 200,000 | (Thailand) Thanya Pattamakijsakul (a) (1) |
| 7 Aug | Singha Chiangmai Open | Chiang Mai | 200,000 | (Thailand) Onkanok Soisuwan (a) (1) |
| 28 Aug | All Thailand Premier Championship | Khon Kaen | 200,000 | (Thailand) Saranporn Langkulgasettrin (5) |
| 11 Sep | Singha Panasonic All Thailand Championship | Chonburi | 200,000 | (Thailand) Pinrath Loomboonruang (1) |

== Order of Merit ==
The Order of Merit was based on prize money won during the season, calculated in Thai baht.

| Position | Player | Prize money (฿) |
|---|---|---|
| 1 | (Thailand) Udorn Duangdecha | 1,489,225 |
| 2 | (Thailand) Chapchai Nirat | 1,117,967 |
| 3 | (Thailand) Jazz Janewattananond | 1,039,875 |
| 4 | (Thailand) Danthai Boonma | 836,708 |
| 5 | (Thailand) Thanyakon Khrongpha | 716,600 |
