= King's Cup (golf) =

Coordinates: 12.819°N 100.950°E

Tournament information
- Location: Thailand
- Established: 2009
- Course: Phoenix Gold Golf Club
- Par: 72
- Length: 7,386 yards (6,754 m)
- Tours: Asian Tour; European Tour
- Format: Stroke play
- Prize fund: US$750,000
- Month played: July
- Final year: 2016

Tournament record score
- Aggregate: 266 Arnond Vongvanij (2012)
- To par: −22 as above

Final champion
- (Taiwan) Chan Shih-chang

Location map
- Location in Thailand

The King's Cup was a professional golf tournament on the Asian Tour that was played in Thailand from 2009 to 2016. The inaugural event was held at the Singha Park Khon Kaen Golf Club with a prize fund of US$300,000.

In 2016, the King's Cup was added to the European Tour schedule.

== Winners ==
| Year | Tour(s) (Note: ASA − Asian Tour; EUR − European Tour.) | Winner | Score | To par | Margin of victory | Runner(s)-up |
King's Cup
| 2016 | ASA, EUR | (Taiwan) Chan Shih-chang | 268 | −12 | 2 strokes | (Taiwan) Lin Wen-tang |
2015: No tournament
| 2014 (Nov) | ASA | (Thailand) Thaworn Wiratchant | 268 | −20 | 2 strokes | (Australia) Andrew Dodt (India) Anirban Lahiri |
King's Cup Golf Hua Hin
| 2014 (Jan) | ASA | (Thailand) Prayad Marksaeng | 276 | −12 | 1 stroke | (Sweden) Rikard Karlberg |
King's Cup
2013: No tournament due to reschedulling
| 2012 | ASA | (Thailand) Arnond Vongvanij | 266 | −22 | 2 strokes | (Singapore) Mardan Mamat (Thailand) Thaworn Wiratchant |
| 2011 | ASA | Cancelled due to flooding | | | | |
| 2010 | ASA | (Thailand) Udorn Duangdecha | 276 | −12 | 2 strokes | (Thailand) Pariya Junhasavasdikul (South Africa) Jbe' Kruger (South Korea) Mo Joong-kyung |
| 2009 | ASA | (Taiwan) Chan Yih-shin | 274 | −14 | Playoff (Note: Chan won with birdie on second extra hole) | (England) Nick Redfern (Scotland) Simon Yates |
