= Omega China Tour seasons =

This page lists all Omega China Tour seasons from its inaugural season in 2005.

Since its inception, all tournaments on the Omega China Tour were played in China.

== 2005 season ==
=== Schedule ===
The following table lists official events during the 2005 season.

Date	Tournament	Location	Purse (CN¥)	Winner (Note: The number in brackets after each winner's name is the number of Omega China Tour events they had won up to and including that tournament.)
19 Aug	Beijing Leg	Hebei	800,000	(China) Li Chao (1)
24 Sep	Kunming Leg	Yunnan	800,000	(China) Qiu Zhifeng (1)
15 Oct	Zhuhai Leg	Guangdong	800,000	(China) Liang Wenchong (1)
5 Nov	Hainan Leg	Hainan	800,000	(China) Li Chao (2)

=== Order of Merit ===
The Order of Merit was based on prize money won during the season, calculated in Renminbi.

Position	Player	Prize money (CN¥)
1	(China) Li Chao	405,300
2	(China) Qiu Zhifeng	178,350
3	(China) Liang Wenchong	150,000
4	(China) Huang Yonghuan	135,600
5	(China) Liao Guiming	130,750

== 2006 season ==
=== Schedule ===
The following table lists official events during the 2006 season.

Date	Tournament	Location	Purse (CN¥)	Winner
9 Apr	Hainan Leg	Hainan	800,000	(China) Liang Wenchong (2)
14 May	Zhuhai Leg	Guangdong	800,000	(China) Zhang Lianwei (1)
18 Jun	Shandong Leg	Shandong	800,000	(China) Li Chao (3)
3 Sep	Shanghai Leg	Shanghai	800,000	(China) Zhang Lianwei (2)
24 Sep	Kunming Leg	Yunnan	800,000	(China) Li Chao (4)
29 Oct	Omega Golf Championship	Hebei	800,000	(China) Liang Wenchong (3)

=== Order of Merit ===
The Order of Merit was based on prize money won during the season, calculated in Renminbi.

Position	Player	Prize money (CN¥)
1	(China) Zhang Lianwei	540,000
2	(China) Li Chao	498,000
3	(China) Liang Wenchong	300,000
4	(China) Huang Mingjie	244,450
5	(China) Yuan Hao	175,000

== 2007 season ==
=== Schedule ===
The following table lists official events during the 2007 season.

Date	Tournament	Location	Purse (CN¥)	Winner
13 May	Sofitel Golf Championship	Jiangsu	800,000	(China) Wu Kangchun (1)
3 Jun	Qingdao Leg	Shandong	800,000	(China) Zhang Lianwei (3)
24 Jun	Guangzhou Leg	Guangdong	800,000	(China) Zhang Lianwei (4)
15 Jul	Yanji Golf Championship	Jilin	800,000	(China) Li Chao (5)
12 Aug	Shanghai Leg	Shanghai	800,000	(China) Li Chao (6)
26 Aug	Kunming Leg	Yunnan	800,000	(China) Zheng Wengen (1)
23 Sep	Xiamen Leg	Fujian	800,000	(China) Li Chao (7)
21 Oct	Omega Golf Championship	Hebei	800,000	(China) Zhang Lianwei (5)

=== Order of Merit ===
The Order of Merit was based on prize money won during the season, calculated in Renminbi.

Position	Player	Prize money (CN¥)
1	(China) Li Chao	652,125
2	(China) Zhang Lianwei	559,750
3	(China) Zheng Wengen	331,200
4	(China) Wu Kangchun	259,568
5	(China) Huang Mingjie	239,500

== 2008 season ==
=== Schedule ===
The following table lists official events during the 2008 season.

Date	Tournament	Location	Purse (CN¥)	Winner
16 Mar	Guangzhou Leg	Guangdong	800,000	(China) Zhang Lianwei (6)
30 Mar	Dell Golf Championship	Fujian	800,000	(China) Li Chao (8)
13 Apr	Kunming Leg	Yunnan	800,000	(China) Lu Wende (1)
18 May	Shanghai Leg	Shanghai	800,000	(Taiwan) Hsu Mong-nan (1)
25 May	Sofitel Golf Championship	Jiangsu	800,000	(China) Liao Guiming (1)
7 Sep	Luxehills Championship	Sichuan	800,000	(Taiwan) Tsai Chi-huang (1)
28 Sep	Tianjin Championship	Tianjin	800,000	(Taiwan) Tsai Chi-huang (2)
12 Oct	Omega Golf Championship	Hebei	1,000,000	(China) Zhou Jun (1)

=== Order of Merit ===
The Order of Merit was based on prize money won during the season, calculated in Renminbi.

Position	Player	Prize money (CN¥)
1	(China) Liao Guiming	375,125
2	(China) Zhang Lianwei	330,000
3	(China) Zhou Jun	263,300
4	(China) Li Chao	243,000
5	(China) Wu Kangchun	184,717

== 2009 season ==
=== Schedule ===
The following table lists official events during the 2009 season.

Date	Tournament	Location	Purse (CN¥)	Winner
22 Mar	Dell Golf Championship	Fujian	1,000,000	(China) Wu Weihuang (1)
26 Apr	Sofitel Zhongshan Open	Guangdong	1,200,000	(Australia) Kurt Barnes (1)
14 Jun	Luxehills Championship	Sichuan	1,000,000	(China) Chen Jian (1)
21 Jun	Dongfeng Nissan Teana Golf Open	Zhejiang	700,000	(Thailand) Thaworn Wiratchant (1)

=== Order of Merit ===
The Order of Merit was based on prize money won during the season, calculated in Renminbi.

Position	Player	Prize money (CN¥)
1	(Australia) Kurt Barnes	264,750
2	(China) Wu Weihuang	215,638
3	(China) Chen Jian	212,338
4	(Thailand) Wisut Artjanawat	144,713
5	(Australia) Rowan Beste	131,769
