= Tsai Chi-huang =

Taiwanese golfer

Personal information
- Nationality: Taiwan
- Born: 29 September 1968 (age 58)

Career
- Sport: Golf
- Status: Professional
- Former tours: Asian Tour; Omega China Tour
- Professional wins: 5

Number of wins by tour
- Asian Tour: 2
- Other: 3

Tsai Chi-huang (Chinese: 蔡啟煌, born 29 September 1968) is a Taiwanese professional golfer.

== Career ==
Tsai has won several events in Taiwan and China, including the 2002 and 2012 Mercuries Taiwan Masters, and the 1997 Taiwan Open.

== Professional wins (5) ==
=== Asian Tour wins (2) ===
No.	Date	Tournament	Winning score	Margin of victory	Runner-up
1	25 Aug 2002	Mercuries Taiwan Masters	−14 (68-69-68-69=274)	5 strokes	(Taiwan) Lu Wen-teh
2	30 Sep 2012	Mercuries Taiwan Masters (2)	−4 (74-69-65-76=284)	4 strokes	(Philippines) Antonio Lascuña

=== Omega China Tour wins (2) ===
No.	Date	Tournament	Winning score	Margin of victory	Runner-up
1	7 Sep 2008	Luxehills Championship	−18 (68-68-66-68=270)	3 strokes	(China) Liao Guiming
2	28 Sep 2008	Tianjin Championship	+1 (73-74-69-73=289)	1 stroke	(China) Su Dong (a)

=== Other wins (1) ===
No.	Date	Tournament	Winning score	Margin of victory	Runner-up
1	6 Jul 1997	Republic of China Open	−14 (274)	7 strokes	(South Africa) André Cruse

== Team appearances ==
Amateur

- Eisenhower Trophy (representing Taiwan): 1990

Professional

- World Cup (representing Taiwan): 1999
