= Stephen Lindskog =

Nigerian-Swedish golfer

Personal information
- Full name: Stephen Atako Lindskog
- Nationality: Sweden
- Born: 16 May 1967 (age 59) Nigeria

Career
- Sport: Golf
- Turned professional: 1989
- Former tour: Asian Tour
- Professional wins: 1

Number of wins by tour
- Asian Tour: 1

Stephen Atako Lindskog (born 16 May 1967) is a Nigerian-Swedish professional golfer.

Lindskog was born in Nigeria and raised in Sweden. He turned professional in 1989 after winning the Spanish Amateur and played on the Swedish Golf Tour. In 1996, he relocated to Jakarta, Indonesia where his parents were based. He joined the Asian Tour and played 104 events between 1996 and 2015 with ten top-10 finishes, reaching an Official World Golf Ranking of 486 in 2000 after winning the Volvo Masters of Malaysia.

== Amateur wins ==
- 1989 Spanish Amateur

== Professional wins (1) ==
=== Asian PGA Tour wins (1) ===
No.	Date	Tournament	Winning score	Margin of victory	Runners-up
1	13 Aug 2000	Volvo Masters of Malaysia	−10 (66-73-68-71=278)	Playoff	(Japan) Shinichi Akiba, (United States) Anthony Kang

Asian PGA Tour playoff record (1–0)

No.	Year	Tournament	Opponents	Result
1	2000	Volvo Masters of Malaysia	(Japan) Shinichi Akiba, (United States) Anthony Kang	Won with birdie on second extra hole
