= 2015 Japan Golf Tour =

Golf tour season

2015 Japan Golf Tour season
- Duration: 16 April 2015 – 6 December 2015
- Number of official events: 25
- Most wins: (South Korea) Kim Kyung-tae (5)
- Money list: (South Korea) Kim Kyung-tae
- Most Valuable Player: (South Korea) Kim Kyung-tae
- Rookie of the Year: (South Korea) Song Young-han

The 2015 Japan Golf Tour was the 43rd season of the Japan Golf Tour (formerly the PGA of Japan Tour), the main professional golf tour in Japan since it was formed in 1973.

== Schedule ==
The following table lists official events during the 2015 season.

Date	Tournament	Location	Purse (¥)	Winner (Note: The number in brackets after each winner's name is the number of Japan Golf Tour events they had won up to and including that tournament. This information is only shown for Japan Golf Tour members.)	OWGR points	Other tours (Note: ASA − Asian Tour; ONE − OneAsia Tour.)	Notes
19 Apr	Token Homemate Cup	Mie	130,000,000	(New Zealand) Michael Hendry (1)	16		
3 May	The Crowns	Aichi	120,000,000	(South Korea) Jang Ik-jae (3)	16		
17 May	Japan PGA Championship Nissin Cupnoodles Cup	Saitama	150,000,000	(Australia) Adam Bland (1)	16		Japan major
24 May	Kansai Open Golf Championship	Shiga	70,000,000	(Japan) Daisuke Kataoka (1)	16		
31 May	Gateway to The Open Mizuno Open	Okayama	100,000,000	(Japan) Taichi Teshima (8)	16		
7 Jun	Japan Golf Tour Championship; Mori Building Cup Shishido Hills	Ibaraki	150,000,000	(China) Liang Wenchong (1)	16		Japan major
14 Jun	Singha Corporation Thailand Open	Thailand	US$1,000,000	(South Korea) Kim Kyung-tae (6)	11	ONE	
28 Jun	ISPS Handa Global Cup	Yamanashi	100,000,000	(Japan) Toshinori Muto (6)	24		New tournament
5 Jul	Shigeo Nagashima Invitational Sega Sammy Cup	Hokkaidō	150,000,000	(Japan) Hiroshi Iwata (2)	16		
12 Jul	Musee Platinum Open	Hyōgo	100,000,000	(South Korea) Kim Kyung-tae (7)	16		New tournament
26 Jul	Dunlop Srixon Fukushima Open	Fukushima	50,000,000	(Thailand) Prayad Marksaeng (5)	16		
30 Aug	RIZAP KBC Augusta	Fukuoka	110,000,000	(Japan) Yuta Ikeda (13)	16		
6 Sep	Fujisankei Classic	Yamanashi	110,000,000	(South Korea) Kim Kyung-tae (8)	16		
20 Sep	ANA Open	Hokkaidō	110,000,000	(Japan) Ryo Ishikawa (12)	16		
27 Sep	Asia-Pacific Diamond Cup Golf	Ibaraki	150,000,000	(South Korea) Kim Kyung-tae (9)	15	ASA	
4 Oct	Top Cup Tokai Classic	Aichi	110,000,000	(South Korea) Kim Hyung-sung (4)	16		
11 Oct	Honma TourWorld Cup	Ibaraki	100,000,000	(South Korea) Lee Kyoung-hoon (2)	16		New tournament
18 Oct	Japan Open Golf Championship	Hyōgo	200,000,000	(Japan) Satoshi Kodaira (3)	32		Flagship event (Note: Also a Japan major championship.)
25 Oct	Bridgestone Open	Chiba	150,000,000	(Japan) Michio Matsumura (5)	16		
1 Nov	Mynavi ABC Championship	Hyōgo	150,000,000	(South Korea) Kim Kyung-tae (10)	16		
8 Nov	Heiwa PGM Championship	Chiba	200,000,000	(Japan) Hideto Tanihara (11)	16		
15 Nov	Mitsui Sumitomo Visa Taiheiyo Masters	Shizuoka	150,000,000	(Japan) Shingo Katayama (29)	22		
22 Nov	Dunlop Phoenix Tournament	Miyazaki	200,000,000	(Japan) Yūsaku Miyazato (3)	24		
29 Nov	Casio World Open	Kōchi	200,000,000	(South Korea) Hwang Jung-gon (3)	16		
6 Dec	Golf Nippon Series JT Cup	Tokyo	130,000,000	(Japan) Ryo Ishikawa (13)	17		Japan major

=== Unofficial events ===
The following events were sanctioned by the Japan Golf Tour, but did not carry official money, nor were wins official.

Date	Tournament	Location	Purse (¥)	Winner(s)	OWGR points	Other tours	Notes
12 Apr	Masters Tournament	United States	US$10,000,000	(United States) Jordan Spieth	100		Major championship
10 May	Legend Charity Pro-Am	Chiba	50,000,000	(Japan) Seiki Okuda	n/a		Pro-Am
21 Jun	U.S. Open	United States	US$10,000,000	(United States) Jordan Spieth	100		Major championship
20 Jul	The Open Championship	Scotland	£6,300,000	(United States) Zach Johnson	100		Major championship
16 Aug	PGA Championship	United States	US$10,000,000	(Australia) Jason Day	100		Major championship
13 Dec	Hitachi 3Tours Championship	Chiba	57,000,000	LPGA of Japan Tour	n/a		Team event

== Money list ==
The money list was based on prize money won during the season, calculated in Japanese yen.

Position	Player	Prize money (¥)
1	(South Korea) Kim Kyung-tae	165,981,625
2	(Japan) Yūsaku Miyazato	103,999,119
3	(Japan) Yuta Ikeda	99,380,317
4	(Japan) Yoshinori Fujimoto	98,642,449
5	(Japan) Shingo Katayama	90,577,641

== Awards ==
Award	Winner	Ref.
Most Valuable Player	(South Korea) Kim Kyung-tae	
Rookie of the Year (Shimada Trophy)	(South Korea) Song Young-han	

== Japan Challenge Tour ==
2015 Japan Challenge Tour season
- Duration: 3 April 2015 – 23 October 2015
- Number of official events: 17
- Most wins: (Japan) Shota Akiyoshi (2) (Japan) Tomoyo Ikemura (2) (Japan) Keiichi Kaneko (2) (Japan) Yu Morimoto (2)
- Money list: (Japan) Yu Morimoto

The 2015 Japan Challenge Tour was the 31st season of the Japan Challenge Tour, the official development tour to the Japan Golf Tour.

=== Schedule ===
The following table lists official events during the 2015 season.

Date	Tournament	Location	Purse (¥)	Winner (Note: The number in brackets after each winner's name is the number of Japan Challenge Tour events they had won up to and including that tournament. It is rare for someone to accumulate many wins on the Japan Challenge Tour as success at this level usually leads to promotion to the Japan Golf Tour.)
5 Apr	Novil Cup	Tokushima	15,000,000	(South Korea) Park Il-hwan (1)
1 May	Fuji Home Service Challenge Cup	Shiga	10,000,000	(Japan) Yujiro Ohori (1)
8 May	Japan Create Challenge	Fukuoka	10,000,000	(Japan) Masashi Hidaka (1)
22 May	Heiwa PGM Challenge I Road to Championship	Hiroshima	10,000,000	(Japan) Tatsunori Nukaga (4)
29 May	Good Job Challenge	Ibaraki	10,000,000	(Japan) Yu Morimoto (1)
11 Jun	ISPS Handa Global Challenge Cup	Chiba	13,000,000	(Japan) Shigeru Nonaka (3)
19 Jun	Musee Platinum Challenge Tournament	Fukushima	10,000,000	(Japan) Yosuke Asaji (2)
26 Jun	Landic Challenge	Fukuoka	10,000,000	(Japan) Tomoyo Ikemura (1)
3 Jul	Heiwa PGM Challenge II Road to Championship	Ibaraki	10,000,000	(Japan) Keiichi Kaneko (1)
31 Jul	Minami Akita Country Club Challenge Tournament	Akita	10,000,000	(Japan) Yu Morimoto (2)
21 Aug	PGA JGTO Challenge Cup	Chiba	13,000,000	(Japan) Keiichi Kaneko (2)
4 Sep	Elite Grips Challenge	Gunma	10,000,000	(Japan) Tomoyo Ikemura (2)
11 Sep	Himawari Dragon CUP	Chiba	10,000,000	(Japan) Koichi Sugimoto (3)
18 Sep	Seven Dreamers Challenge	Chiba	10,000,000	(Japan) Shota Akiyoshi (2)
10 Oct	Everyone Project Challenge Golf Tournament	Tochigi	10,000,000	(Japan) Shota Akiyoshi (3)
16 Oct	Taiheiyo Club Challenge Tournament	Ibaraki	10,000,000	(Japan) Hiroaki Hirai (1)
23 Oct	JGTO Novil Final	Chiba	10,000,000	(Japan) Masamichi Uehira (5)

=== Money list ===
The money list was based on prize money won during the season, calculated in Japanese yen. The top 10 players on the money list earned status to play on the 2016 Japan Golf Tour.

Position	Player	Prize money (¥)
1	(Japan) Yu Morimoto	4,479,531
2	(Japan) Shota Akiyoshi	4,476,532
3	(Japan) Tomoyo Ikemura	4,176,327
4	(Japan) Keiichi Kaneko	3,933,918
5	(South Korea) Park Il-hwan	3,786,804
6	(Japan) Yosuke Asaji	3,503,141
7	(Japan) Yujiro Ohori	3,050,254
8	(Japan) Tatsunori Nukaga	3,024,346
9	(Japan) Masashi Hidaka	2,959,583
10	(Japan) Masamichi Uehira	2,863,443
