= Daisuke Kataoka =

Japanese professional golfer

Personal information
- Nationality: Japan
- Born: 17 October 1988 (age 38) Kōchi Prefecture, Japan
- Height: 1.67 m (5 ft 6 in)
- Weight: 68 kg (150 lb; 10.7 st)

Career
- Sport: Golf
- Turned professional: 2007
- Current tours: Japan Golf Tour; Asian Tour
- Professional wins: 4

Number of wins by tour
- Japan Golf Tour: 3
- Asian Tour: 1
- Other: 1

Daisuke Kataoka (片岡 大育, Kataoka Daisuke; born 17 October 1988) is a Japanese professional golfer.

== Career ==
Kataoka plays on the Asian Tour and the Japan Golf Tour. On the Asian Tour, he has three top-10 finishes including a trio of third places: 2011 Mercuries Taiwan Masters, 2013 CIMB Niaga Indonesian Masters, and 2013 Queen's Cup. On the Japan Golf Tour, he won the 2015 Kansai Open Golf Championship, the 2016 Top Cup Tokai Classic and the 2017 Asia-Pacific Diamond Cup Golf.

== Professional wins (4) ==
=== Japan Golf Tour wins (3) ===
No.	Date	Tournament	Winning score	Margin of victory	Runner(s)-up
1	24 May 2015	Kansai Open Golf Championship	−17 (66-67-67-67=267)	3 strokes	(Australia) Brad Kennedy
2	2 Oct 2016	Top Cup Tokai Classic	−16 (68-67-71-66=272)	1 stroke	(Japan) Yuta Ikeda
3	24 Sep 2017	Asia-Pacific Diamond Cup Golf^{1}	−12 (67-69-66-70=272)	2 strokes	(Japan) Tadahiro Takayama, (Thailand) Poom Saksansin

^{1}Co-sanctioned by the Asian Tour

Japan Golf Tour playoff record (0–1)

No.	Year	Tournament	Opponent	Result
1	2016	The Crowns	(South Korea) Kim Kyung-tae	Lost to par on first extra hole

=== Asian Tour wins (1) ===
No.	Date	Tournament	Winning score	Margin of victory	Runners-up
1	24 Sep 2017	Asia-Pacific Diamond Cup Golf^{1}	−12 (67-69-66-70=272)	2 strokes	(Japan) Tadahiro Takayama, (Thailand) Poom Saksansin

^{1}Co-sanctioned by the Japan Golf Tour

=== Other wins (1) ===
- 2007 Chushikoku Open (as an amateur)

== Results in World Golf Championships ==
Tournament	2017
Championship	
Match Play	
Invitational	
Champions	T15

Did not play

"T" = Tied
