= Li Chao (golfer) =

Chinese professional golfer

Personal information
- Nationality: China
- Born: 19 April 1980 (age 46)

Career
- Sport: Golf
- Turned professional: 2003
- Former tours: Asian Tour; Omega China Tour
- Professional wins: 8

Achievements and awards
- Omega China Tour Order of Merit winner: 2005, 2007

Li Chao (born 19 April 1980) is a Chinese professional golfer.

== Career ==
Li turned professional in 2003. He has played mainly on the Omega China Tour, winning several tournaments and the Order of Merit in 2005 and 2007. He has also played on the Asian Tour. He played in the 2010 WGC-HSBC Champions, finishing 75th.

== Personal life ==
Li lives in Shanghai.

== Professional wins (8) ==
=== Omega China Tour wins (8) ===
No.	Date	Tournament	Winning score	Margin of victory	Runner(s)-up
1	19 Aug 2005	Beijing Leg	−10 (68-71-67=206)	9 strokes	(China) Wu Weihuang
2	5 Nov 2005	Hainan Leg	−10 (70-70-66=206)	Playoff	(China) Huang Yonghuan
3	18 Jun 2006	Shandong Leg	+3 (75-71-71-74=291)	1 stroke	(China) Yuan Hao
4	24 Sep 2006	Kunming Leg	−11 (68-73-65-71=277)	7 strokes	(China) Huang Mingjie
5	15 Jul 2007	Yanji Golf Championship	+1 (74-72-72-71=289)	4 strokes	(China) Huang Mingjie, (China) Zheng Wengen
6	12 Aug 2007	Shanghai Leg	−6 (73-72-69-68=282)	1 stroke	(Taiwan) Tsai Chi-huang
7	23 Sep 2007	Xiamen Leg	−2 (69-71-72-66=278)	1 stroke	(China) Shang Lei
8	30 Mar 2008	Dell Golf Championship (2)	−6 (69-70-69-66=274)	3 strokes	(China) Zhang Lianwei

== Results in World Golf Championships ==
Tournament	2010
Match Play	
Championship	
Invitational	
Champions	75

Did not play
