= 2001 WGC-World Cup =

Golf tournament

2001 World Cup
Tournament information
- Dates: 15–18 November
- Location: Gotemba, Shizuoka Prefecture, Japan; 35°18′31.3″N 138°56′4.6″E
- Course: Taiheiyo Club
- Format: 72 holes stroke play (best ball & alternate shot)

Statistics
- Par: 72
- Length: 7,277 yards (6,654 m)
- Field: 24 two-man teams
- Cut: None
- Prize fund: US$3.0 million
- Winner's share: US$1.0 million

Champion
- South Africa; Ernie Els & Retief Goosen
- 264 (−24)
- Location in Asia Location in Japan Location in Shizuoka Prefecture

The 2001 WGC-World Cup took place 15–18 November at the Taiheiyo Club, Gotemba Course in Gotemba, Shizuoka Prefecture, Japan. It was the 47th World Cup and the second as a World Golf Championship event. 24 countries competed and each country sent two players. The prize money totaled $3,000,000 with $1,000,000 going to the winning pair. The South African team of Ernie Els and Retief Goosen won in a sudden-death playoff over teams from Denmark, New Zealand and the United States.

== Qualification and format ==
18 teams qualified based on the Official World Golf Ranking and were six teams via qualifiers.

The tournament was a 72-hole stroke play team event with each team consisting of two players. The first and third days were fourball play and the second and final days were foursomes play.

== Teams ==
Country	Players
Argentina	Ángel Cabrera and Eduardo Romero
Australia	Aaron Baddeley and Adam Scott
Canada	Ian Leggatt and Mike Weir
China	Liang Wenchong and Zhang Lianwei
Denmark	Thomas Bjørn and Søren Hansen
England	Paul Casey and Ian Poulter
Fiji	Dinesh Chand and Vijay Singh
France	Raphaël Jacquelin and Thomas Levet
Ireland	Pádraig Harrington and Paul McGinley
Japan	Toshimitsu Izawa and Shigeki Maruyama
Malaysia	Danny Chia and Periasamy Gunasegaran
Mexico	Octavio Gonzalez and Alex Quiroz
Netherlands	Maarten Lafeber and Robert-Jan Derksen
New Zealand	Michael Campbell and David Smail
Norway	Henrik Bjørnstad and Per Haugsrud
Paraguay	Ángel Franco and Carlos Franco
Philippines	Rodrigo Cuello and Danny Zarate
Scotland	Andrew Coltart and Dean Robertson
South Africa	Ernie Els and Retief Goosen
Spain	Sergio García and Miguel Ángel Jiménez
Sweden	Niclas Fasth and Robert Karlsson
United States	David Duval and Tiger Woods
Wales	Mark Mouland and Phillip Price
Zimbabwe	Tony Johnstone and Mark McNulty

== Scores ==
Place	Country	Score	To par	Money (US$)
1	South Africa	64-71-63-66=264	−24	1,000,000
T2	Denmark	65-69-65-65=264	−24	316,667
T2	New Zealand	63-66-65-70=264	−24	316,667
T2	United States	66-68-63-67=264	−24	316,667
5	England	65-72-63-67=267	−21	115,000
T6	Canada	62-73-66-67=268	−20	95,000
T6	Spain	63-71-65-69=268	−20	95,000
T8	Argentina	67-68-63-71=269	−19	70,000
T8	Fiji	66-69-66-68=269	−19	70,000
T8	France	67-68-63-71=269	−19	70,000
T11	Japan	64-69-65-72=270	−18	50,000
T11	Scotland	62-71-66-71=270	−18	50,000
T11	Wales	66-71-62-71=270	−18	50,000
T14	Australia	66-70-64-71=271	−17	39,500
T14	Ireland	64-72-64-71=271	−17	39,500
16	Sweden	62-73-66-71=272	−16	38,000
T17	China	67-69-68-70=274	−14	36,000
T17	Mexico	66-71-67-70=274	−14	36,000
T17	Norway	67-72-61-74=274	−14	36,000
20	Zimbabwe	66-74-66-72=278	−10	34,000
21	Paraguay	68-72-66-75=281	−7	33,000
22	Netherlands	70-72-64-76=282	−6	32,000
23	Malaysia	66-80-68-71=285	−3	31,000
24	Philippines	67-75-73-74=289	+1	30,000

Playoff

- First hole: Denmark and South Africa advance with birdies, New Zealand and the United States eliminated
- Second hole: South Africa wins with par
