= 2003 TPC Tour =

Golf tour season

2003 TPC Tour season
- Duration: 10 April 2003 – 30 July 2003
- Number of official events: 4

The 2003 TPC Tour was the fifth season of the TPC Tour, one of the main professional golf tours in Thailand since it was formed in 1999.

== Schedule ==
The following table lists official events during the 2003 season.

Date	Tournament	Location	Purse (฿)	Winner (Note: The number in brackets after each winner's name is the number of All Thailand Golf Tour events they had won up to and including that tournament.)
13 Apr	Singha Pattaya Open	Chonburi	1,000,000	(Thailand) Thaworn Wiratchant (2)
22 Jun	TPC Championships	Samut Prakan	1,000,000	(United States) Jim Johnson (1)
26 Jul	Singha Classic	Phetchaburi	1,000,000	(Thailand) Boonchu Ruangkit (3)
30 Jul	Cotto Open	Chonburi	1,000,000	(Scotland) Simon Yates (1)
