= 2010 All Thailand Golf Tour =

Golf tour season

2010 All Thailand Golf Tour season
- Duration: 28 January 2010 – 26 December 2010
- Number of official events: 5
- Most wins: (Thailand) Udorn Duangdecha (2)
- Order of Merit (men): (Thailand) Udorn Duangdecha

The 2010 All Thailand Golf Tour, titled as the 2010 Singha All Thailand Golf Tour for sponsorship reasons, was the 12th season of the All Thailand Golf Tour (formerly the TPC Tour), one of the main professional golf tours in Thailand since it was formed in 1999.

== Schedule ==
The following tables list official events during the 2010 season.

=== Men's events ===
| Date | Tournament | Location | Purse (฿) | Winner (Note: The number in brackets after each winner's name is the number of All Thailand Golf Tour events they had won up to and including that tournament.) | Other tours (Note: ASEAN − ASEAN PGA Tour.) |
|---|---|---|---|---|---|
| 31 Jan | Singha Masters | Chiang Rai | 3,000,000 | (Singapore) Lam Chih Bing (1) | |
| 2 May | Singha Pattaya Open | Chonburi | 1,600,000 | (Thailand) Udorn Duangdecha (1) | ASEAN |
| 18 Jul | Singha E-San Open | Khon Kaen | 1,600,000 | (Thailand) Thaworn Wiratchant (5) | ASEAN |
| 4 Sep | B-Ing TPC Championships | Lopbori | 1,500,000 | (Thailand) Udorn Duangdecha (2) | |
| 26 Dec | Singha Classic | Nakhon Ratchasima | 1,500,000 | (Thailand) Prayad Marksaeng (8) | |

=== Women's events ===
| Date | Tournament | Location | Purse (฿) | Winner |
|---|---|---|---|---|
| 31 Jan | Singha Masters | Chiang Rai | 100,000 | (Thailand) Thidapa Suwannapura (a) (2) |
| 4 Sep | B-Ing TPC Championships | Lopbori | 100,000 | (Thailand) Chayuda Singhsuwan (1) |
| 26 Dec | Singha Classic | Nakhon Ratchasima | 100,000 | (Thailand) Tanaporn Kongkiatkrai (1) |

== Order of Merit ==
The Order of Merit was based on prize money won during the season, calculated in Thai baht.

| Position | Player | Prize money (฿) |
|---|---|---|
| 1 | (Thailand) Udorn Duangdecha | 592,208 |
| 2 | (Singapore) Lam Chih Bing | 480,000 |
| 3 | (Thailand) Chawinroj Rungsrichai | 344,035 |
| 4 | (Thailand) Thaworn Wiratchant | 340,917 |
| 5 | (Thailand) Chawalit Plaphol | 287,783 |
