= Zaw Moe =

Burmese professional golfer (born 1967)

Personal information
- Nationality: Myanmar
- Born: 28 June 1967 (age 59)
- Height: 6 ft 0 in (1.83 m)
- Weight: 198 lb (90 kg; 14.1 st)

Career
- Sport: Golf
- Turned professional: 1989
- Current tour: Asian Tour
- Former tour: Japan Golf Tour
- Professional wins: 5

Number of wins by tour
- Asian Tour: 1

Zaw Moe (born 28 June 1967) is a Burmese professional golfer.

== Career ==
In 1989, Moe turned professional. He began to have success on the Asian circuit. In 1997 he won the SingTel Ericsson Singapore Open on the Asian Tour, and in the late 1990s he also played regularly on the Japan Golf Tour. In the mid-2000s Moe battled health problems, including a serious liver infection, but in 2011 he retained his Asian Tour card for the first time since 2007 by finishing 40th in the Order of Merit.

== Professional wins (5) ==
=== Asian PGA Tour wins (1) ===
| No. | Date | Tournament | Winning score | Margin of victory | Runner-up |
|---|---|---|---|---|---|
| 1 | 17 Aug 1997 | SingTel Ericsson Singapore Open | −11 (67-69-69-72=277) | 3 strokes | (United States) Fran Quinn |

Asian PGA Tour playoff record (0–3)

| No. | Year | Tournament | Opponent(s) | Result |
|---|---|---|---|---|
| 1 | 1996 | Merlion Masters | (United States) Peter Teravainen | Lost to birdie on first extra hole |
| 2 | 1998 | Volvo Masters of Malaysia | (Australia) Adrian Percey, (South Africa) Chris Williams | Williams won with birdie on fourth extra hole Percey eliminated by par on first hole |
| 3 | 1999 | Lexus International | (Pakistan) Taimur Hussain, (India) Jeev Milkha Singh | Singh won with birdie on third extra hole Hussain eliminated by par on first hole |

=== Other wins (4) ===
- 1992 3 TDC Tour of Malaysia wins
- 1993 Singapore PGA Championship
