= Dubai Open (golf) =

Tournament information
- Location: Dubai, United Arab Emirates
- Established: 2014
- Course: The Els Club
- Par: 72
- Length: 7,538 yards (6,893 m)
- Tour: Asian Tour
- Format: Stroke play
- Prize fund: US$500,000
- Month played: December
- Final year: 2014

Tournament record score
- Aggregate: 272 Arjun Atwal (2014)
- To par: −16 as above

Final champion
- (India) Arjun Atwal
- Location in the United Arab Emirates

The Dubai Open, styled DUBAi Open, was a golf tournament on the Asian Tour. It was played just once, in December 2014 at The Els Club in Dubai Sports City, Dubai, UAE. The purse was US$500,000 with a first prize of $90,000. The event was promoted and organised by "Golf in Dubai" and was the Asian Tour's final event in 2014.

Arjun Atwal won the event. Playing in the final group with Wang Jeung-hun, Atwal was one behind playing the last hole but he got a birdie 4 while Wang took 6, turning a one shot deficit into a one shot victory.

== Winners ==
Year	Winner	Score	To par	Margin of victory	Runner-up
2014	(India) Arjun Atwal	272	−16	1 stroke	(South Korea) Wang Jeung-hun
