= Merlion Masters =

Asian golf tournament

Tournament information
- Location: Singapore
- Established: 1995
- Course: SAFRA Resort
- Par: 72
- Tour: Asian Tour
- Format: Stroke play
- Prize fund: US$200,000
- Month played: November
- Final year: 1996

Tournament record score
- Aggregate: 278 Zaw Moe (1996); 278 Peter Teravainen (1996)
- To par: −10 as above

Final champion
- (United States) Peter Teravainen

Location map
- Location in Singapore

The Merlion Masters was a golf tournament that was held in Singapore in 1995 and 1996. It was an event on the Asian Tour.

The Merlion Masters was hosted at Laguna National Golf and Country Club in 1995, when it was won by South African Nico van Rensburg, and the SAFRA Resort in 1996, when Singapore resident Peter Teravainen won the title in a sudden-death playoff.

== Winners ==
Year	Winner	Score	To par	Margin of victory	Runner-up	Venue	Ref.
1996	(United States) Peter Teravainen	278	−10	Playoff (Note: Teravainen won on the first hole of a sudden-death playoff)	(Myanmar) Zaw Moe	SAFRA Resort	
1995	(South Africa) Nico van Rensburg	279	−9	1 stroke	(Australia) Don Fardon	Laguna National	
