= Yeh Wei-tze =

Taiwanese professional golfer

Personal information
- Full name: Yeh Wei-tze
- Nationality: Taiwan
- Born: 20 February 1973 (age 53) Taipei, Taiwan
- Height: 1.73 m (5 ft 8 in)

Career
- Sport: Golf
- Turned professional: 1994
- Former tours: European Tour; Japan Golf Tour; Asian Tour; PGA Tour China; Taiwan PGA Tour
- Professional wins: 6

Number of wins by tour
- European Tour: 1
- Japan Golf Tour: 2
- Asian Tour: 1
- Other: 3
Medal record
Representing Chinese Taipei
Asian Games
Silver medal – second place	1994 Hiroshima	Men's team

Yeh Wei-tze (Chinese: 葉偉志, born 20 February 1973) is a Taiwanese professional golfer.

== Early life and amateur career ==
Yeh was born in Taipei. Representing his country as an amateur, Yeh was a member of the 1990 Eisenhower Trophy team, and then again at the 1992 tournament.

== Professional career ==
He turned professional in 1994, played on the Asian Tour and was coached in his early career by pioneering Taiwanese golfer Lu Liang-Huan. In 2000, he won the European Tour co-sanctioned Benson & Hedges Malaysian Open, only the second Taiwanese player to win on that tour following Lu, who won the French Open in 1971. The win also helped Yeh to second place on the Davidoff Asian PGA Order of Merit that season.

In 2003, Yeh joined the Japan Golf Tour. He has won twice on that tour, the 2003 ANA Open and the 2006 Sega Sammy Cup.

== Professional wins (5) ==
=== European Tour wins (1) ===
No.	Date	Tournament	Winning score	Margin of victory	Runners-up
1	13 Feb 2000	Benson & Hedges Malaysian Open^{1}	−10 (74-68-67-69=278)	1 stroke	(United States) Craig Hainline, (Republic of Ireland) Pádraig Harrington, (South Africa) Des Terblanche

^{1}Co-sanctioned by the Asian PGA Tour

=== Japan Golf Tour wins (2) ===
No.	Date	Tournament	Winning score	Margin of victory	Runner(s)-up
1	21 Sep 2003	ANA Open	−11 (67-66-72-72=277)	1 stroke	(Japan) Masashi Ozaki, (Japan) Tsuyoshi Yoneyama
2	23 Jul 2006	Sega Sammy Cup	−12 (70-68-72-66=276)	4 strokes	(Japan) Hidemasa Hoshino

=== Asian PGA Tour wins (1) ===
No.	Date	Tournament	Winning score	Margin of victory	Runners-up
1	13 Feb 2000	Benson & Hedges Malaysian Open^{1}	−10 (74-68-67-69=278)	1 stroke	(United States) Craig Hainline, (Republic of Ireland) Pádraig Harrington, (South Africa) Des Terblanche

^{1}Co-sanctioned by the European Tour

=== Taiwan PGA Tour wins (1) ===
No.	Date	Tournament	Winning score	Margin of victory	Runner-up
1	23 Feb 2015	Golden Eagle Open	−6 (70-68-70-74=282)	3 strokes	(Taiwan) Hsieh Tung-hung

=== Other wins (2) ===
- 2005 Taifong Open
- 2007 Taifong Open

== Team appearances ==
Amateur

- Eisenhower Trophy (representing Taiwan): 1990, 1992
