= Udorn Duangdecha =

Thai professional golfer (born 1970)

Personal information
- Nationality: Thailand
- Born: 18 October 1970 (age 56)

Career
- Sport: Golf
- Turned professional: 2000
- Current tour: Asian Tour
- Professional wins: 7

Number of wins by tour
- Asian Tour: 1
- Other: 6

Achievements and awards
- All Thailand Golf Tour Order of Merit winner: 2010, 2016

Udorn Duangdecha (born 18 October 1970) is a Thai professional golfer.

== Professional career ==
Udorn plays on the Asian Tour where he has won once - the 2010 King's Cup.

== Professional wins (7) ==
=== Asian Tour wins (1) ===
No.	Date	Tournament	Winning score	Margin of victory	Runners-up
1	28 Nov 2010	King's Cup	−12 (70-71-69-66=276)	2 strokes	(Thailand) Pariya Junhasavasdikul, (South Africa) Jbe' Kruger, (South Korea) Mo Joong-kyung

=== All Thailand Golf Tour wins (5) ===
No.	Date	Tournament	Winning score	Margin of victory	Runner(s)-up
1	2 May 2010	Singha Pattaya Open^{1}	−16 (69-66-69-68=272)	1 stroke	(South Korea) Baek Seuk-hyun, (Philippines) Jay Bayron
2	4 Sep 2010	B-Ing TPC Championships			
3	2 Jul 2011	Singha E-San Open^{1}	−18 (66-65-68-71=270)	4 strokes	(Thailand) Prom Meesawat, (Thailand) Chawalit Plaphol, (Thailand) Tanutchan Puaktes
4	28 Aug 2016	All Thailand Premier Championship	−12 (71-71-70-64=276)	Playoff	(Thailand) Kammalas Namuangruk (a)
5	8 Apr 2018	Singha Hua Hin Open	−9 (69-68-67-71=275)	1 stroke	(Thailand) Prom Meesawat

^{1}Co-sanctioned by the ASEAN PGA Tour

=== ASEAN PGA Tour wins (2) ===
No.	Date	Tournament	Winning score	Margin of victory	Runners-up
1	2 May 2010	Singha Pattaya Open^{1}	−16 (69-66-69-68=272)	1 stroke	(South Korea) Baek Seuk-hyun, (Philippines) Jay Bayron
2	2 Jul 2011	Singha E-San Open^{1}	−18 (66-65-68-71=270)	4 strokes	(Thailand) Prom Meesawat, (Thailand) Chawalit Plaphol, (Thailand) Tanutchan Puaktes

^{1}Co-sanctioned by the All Thailand Golf Tour

=== Thailand PGA Tour wins (1) ===
No.	Date	Tournament	Winning score	Margin of victory	Runner-up
1	24 Sep 2016	Singha SAT Championship #5	−18 (66-64-68-68=266)	4 strokes	(Thailand) Pijit Petchkasem

== Team appearances ==
- World Cup (representing Thailand): 1995

== See also ==
- List of male golfers
