= 2000 Asian PGA Tour =

Golf tour season

2000 Asian PGA Tour season
- Duration: 10 February 2000 – 14 December 2000
- Number of official events: 21
- Most wins: (England) Simon Dyson (3)
- Order of Merit: (England) Simon Dyson
- Players' Player of the Year: (England) Simon Dyson
- Rookie of the Year: (England) Simon Dyson

The 2000 Asian PGA Tour, titled as the 2000 Davidoff Tour for sponsorship reasons, was the sixth season of the Asian PGA Tour, the main professional golf tour in Asia (outside of Japan) since it was established in 1995.

It was the second season of the tour under a title sponsorship agreement with Davidoff, that was announced in May 1999.

== Schedule ==
The following table lists official events during the 2000 season.

Date	Tournament	Host country	Purse (US$)	Winner (Note: The number in brackets after each winner's name is the number of Asian PGA Tour events they had won up to and including that tournament. This information is only shown for Asian PGA Tour members.)	OWGR points	Other tours (Note: ANZ − PGA Tour of Australasia; EUR − European Tour; KOR − Korean Tour.)	Notes
13 Feb	Benson & Hedges Malaysian Open	Malaysia	825,000	(Taiwan) Yeh Wei-tze (1)	12	EUR	
20 Feb	Casino Filipino Open	Philippines	200,000	(Thailand) Prayad Marksaeng (4)	6		New tournament
27 Feb	London Myanmar Open	Myanmar	200,000	(South Africa) James Kingston (3)	6		
19 Mar	Wills Indian Open	India	300,000	(India) Jyoti Randhawa (3)	6		
30 Apr	Maekyung LG Fashion Open	South Korea	350,000	(South Korea) Kang Wook-soon (6)	6	KOR	
14 May	Macau Open	Macau	200,000	(England) Simon Dyson (1)	6		
21 May	Volvo China Open	China	400,000	(England) Simon Dyson (2)	6		
28 May	Ericsson Classic	Taiwan	200,000	(South Africa) James Kingston (4)	6		
4 Jun	Hyundai Motors Masters	South Korea	250,000	(South Korea) Choi Gwang-soo (1)	6		New tournament
13 Aug	Volvo Masters of Malaysia	Malaysia	250,000	(Sweden) Stephen Lindskog (1)	6		
27 Aug	ROC PGA Championship	Taiwan	300,000	(Japan) Daisuke Maruyama (1)	6		New tournament
3 Sep	Mercuries Taiwan Masters	Taiwan	300,000	(Taiwan) Lin Keng-chi (4)	6		
10 Sep	Johnnie Walker Taiwan Open	Taiwan	300,000	(Fiji) Vijay Singh (n/a)	8		
8 Oct	Kolon Cup Korea Open	South Korea	₩400,000,000	(Thailand) Thongchai Jaidee (1)	6	KOR	
29 Oct	Lexus International	Thailand	260,000	(South Africa) Craig Kamps (2)	6		
5 Nov	Hero Honda Masters	India	200,000	(India) Arjun Atwal (2)	6		
12 Nov	Star Alliance Open	Hong Kong	300,000	(India) Arjun Atwal (3)	6		New tournament
19 Nov	Johnnie Walker Classic	Thailand	£800,000	(United States) Tiger Woods (n/a)	24	ANZ, EUR	
3 Dec	Thailand Open	Thailand	200,000	(South Africa) Des Terblanche (3)	6		
10 Dec	Singapore Open	Singapore	400,000	(India) Jyoti Randhawa (4)	6		
17 Dec	Omega Hong Kong Open	Hong Kong	500,000	(England) Simon Dyson (3)	6		

== Order of Merit ==
The Order of Merit was based on prize money won during the season, calculated in U.S. dollars.

Position	Player	Prize money ($)
1	(England) Simon Dyson	282,371
2	(India) Jyoti Randhawa	224,898
3	(Taiwan) Yeh Wei-tze	224,357
4	(South Africa) Craig Kamps	165,325
5	(India) Arjun Atwal	163,049

== Awards ==
Award	Winner	Ref.
Players' Player of the Year	(England) Simon Dyson	
Rookie of the Year	(England) Simon Dyson	
