= 2002 Asian PGA Tour =

Golf tour season

2002 Asian PGA Tour season
- Duration: 24 January 2002 – 8 December 2002
- Number of official events: 19
- Order of Merit: (India) Jyoti Randhawa
- Players' Player of the Year: (India) Jyoti Randhawa
- Rookie of the Year: (United States) Kevin Na

The 2002 Asian PGA Tour, titled as the 2002 Davidoff Tour for sponsorship reasons, was the eighth season of the Asian PGA Tour, the main professional golf tour in Asia (outside of Japan) since it was established in 1995.

It was the fourth season of the tour under a title sponsorship agreement with Davidoff, that was announced in May 1999.

== Schedule ==
The following table lists official events during the 2002 season.

Date	Tournament	Host country	Purse (US$)	Winner (Note: The number in brackets after each winner's name is the number of Asian PGA Tour events they had won up to and including that tournament. This information is only shown for Asian PGA Tour members.)	OWGR points	Other tours (Note: ANZ − PGA Tour of Australasia; EUR − European Tour; KOR − Korean Tour.)	Notes
27 Jan	Johnnie Walker Classic	Australia	£1,000,000	(South Africa) Retief Goosen (n/a)	42	ANZ, EUR	
10 Feb	London Myanmar Open	Myanmar	200,000	(Thailand) Thongchai Jaidee (3)	6		
17 Feb	Hero Honda Masters	India	300,000	(India) Harmeet Kahlon (1)	6		
24 Feb	Caltex Singapore Masters	Singapore	900,000	(India) Arjun Atwal (4)	16	EUR	
3 Mar	Carlsberg Malaysian Open	Malaysia	1,000,000	(Scotland) Alastair Forsyth (n/a)	16	EUR	
10 Mar	Casino Filipino Philippine Open	Philippines	175,000	(Canada) Rick Gibson (1)	6		
17 Mar	Royal Challenge Indian Open	India	300,000	(India) Vijay Kumar (1)	6		
28 Apr	SK Telecom Open	South Korea	₩500,000,000	(South Korea) Charlie Wi (5)	6	KOR	
4 May	Maekyung LG Fashion Open	South Korea	₩500,000,000	(New Zealand) Eddie Lee (a) (1)	6	KOR	
25 Aug	Mercuries Taiwan Masters	Taiwan	300,000	(Taiwan) Tsai Chi-huang (1)	6		
1 Sep	Shinhan Donghae Open	South Korea	₩500,000,000	(South Korea) Hur Suk-ho (1)	6	KOR	
8 Sep	Kolon Cup Korea Open	South Korea	₩500,000,000	(Spain) Sergio García (1)	14	KOR	
15 Sep	Volvo China Open	China	500,000	(Australia) David Gleeson (1)	6		
22 Sep	Acer Taiwan Open	Taiwan	300,000	(Malaysia) Danny Chia (1)	6		
20 Oct	Macau Open	Macau	250,000	(China) Zhang Lianwei (4)	8		
17 Nov	TCL Classic	China	1,000,000	(Scotland) Colin Montgomerie (n/a)	14		New tournament
24 Nov	BMW Asian Open	Taiwan	1,500,000	(Republic of Ireland) Pádraig Harrington (n/a)	16	EUR	
1 Dec	Omega Hong Kong Open	Hong Kong	700,000	(Sweden) Freddie Jacobson (n/a)	16	EUR	
8 Dec	Volvo Masters of Asia	Malaysia	500,000	(United States) Kevin Na (1)	6		New tournament

== Order of Merit ==
The Order of Merit was based on prize money won during the season, calculated in U.S. dollars.

Position	Player	Prize money ($)
1	(India) Jyoti Randhawa	266,264
2	(Thailand) Thongchai Jaidee	242,558
3	(India) Arjun Atwal	207,625
4	(United States) Kevin Na	171,574
5	(Thailand) Thammanoon Sriroj	168,782

== Awards ==
Award	Winner	Ref.
Players' Player of the Year	(India) Jyoti Randhawa	
Rookie of the Year	(United States) Kevin Na	
