= Zhang Lianwei =

Chinese professional golfer (born 1965)

Zhang Lianwei 张连伟
Personal information
- Nationality: China
- Born: 2 May 1965 (age 61) Zhuhai, Guangdong, China
- Height: 1.78 m (5 ft 10 in)
- Weight: 73 kg (161 lb; 11.5 st)

Career
- Sport: Golf
- Turned professional: 1994
- Current tour: European Senior Tour
- Former tours: European Tour; Japan Golf Tour; Asian Tour; Canadian Tour; Omega China Tour
- Professional wins: 22
- Highest ranking: 93 (11 May 2003)

Number of wins by tour
- European Tour: 1
- Asian Tour: 6
- European Senior Tour: 1
- Other: 15

Best results in major championships
- Masters Tournament: CUT: 2004
- PGA Championship: DNP
- U.S. Open: DNP
- The Open Championship: DNP

Achievements and awards
- Omega China Tour Order of Merit winner: 2006
Medal record
Asian Games
Silver medal – second place	1994 Hiroshima	Individual

Zhang Lianwei (Chinese: 张连伟; born 2 May 1965) is a Chinese professional golfer.

Zhang was the first golfer from the People's Republic of China to achieve substantial success on the international professional circuit. In January 2003 he became the first Chinese golfer to win on the European Tour, and the following year was the first to compete in the Masters Tournament, one of the four major championships.

== Early life ==
Zhang was born in Zhuhai in Guangdong Province. The People's Republic of China's first golf course opened in 1984, and Zhang took up the game soon afterwards. He worked as a caddie and won the China Amateur Open Championship three times.

== Professional career ==
In 1994, Zhang turned professional. Early in his career, Zhang won a number of smaller tournaments around Asia, in China, Malaysia and Thailand. He has competed predominantly on the Asian Tour since 1997 but has also played extensively on the Japan Golf Tour. He has also played outside Asia with limited success. However he did win a tournament in Canada in 2000.

Zhang came to global attention at the 2003 Caltex Singapore Masters, where he edged out Ernie Els with a birdie on the final hole to become the first Chinese golfer to win on the European Tour. With this victory he also became the first Chinese golfer to make the top 100 in the Official World Golf Rankings. As a result, in 2004 he received a special invitation to play in the Masters Tournament, becoming the first player from mainland China to compete in the tournament. His invite drew significant criticism, with many players believing that there were other Asian golfers more deserving of a place in the Augusta field.

Zhang has won a total of five tournaments on the Asian Tour, and has a best end of season ranking of 2nd on the Order of Merit, achieved in 2003. He has also won six times on the China Tour, where he topped the Order of Merit in 2006.

In 2009, while being invited to compete in the Omega European Masters in Crans-sur-Sierre Switzerland, Zhang met Stéphane Barras the local club pro, who later became his coach. In February 2010 Zhang and Stéphane opened a golf training center in Haigeng, Kunming in the province of Yunnan, (the Olympic training ground of China). In April 2010, Zhang regained his title at the PGA of China and in 2011 he finishing -13 and best Chinese at the China Open co-sanctioned with European Tour, OneAsia tour and Asian Tour.

In 2014, Zhang hit the very first tee shot in the history of the newly established PGA Tour China. In 2015 he was a rookie on the European Senior Tour. In 2016, he won his first senior title, the SSE Enterprise Wales Senior Open.

== Amateur wins ==
- 1989 China Amateur Open Championship
- 1991 China Amateur Open Championship
- 1994 China Amateur Open Championship

== Professional wins (22) ==
=== European Tour wins (1) ===
No.	Date	Tournament	Winning score	Margin of victory	Runner-up
1	26 Jan 2003	Caltex Masters^{1}	−10 (68-71-69-70=278)	1 stroke	(South Africa) Ernie Els

^{1}Co-sanctioned by the Asian Tour

=== Asian PGA Tour wins (6) ===
No.	Date	Tournament	Winning score	Margin of victory	Runner(s)-up
1	13 Aug 1995	Volvo Masters of Thailand	−14 (68-70-69-67=274)	3 strokes	(United States) Gerry Norquist, (Australia) Neale Smith
2	22 Dec 1996	Volvo Asian Matchplay	1 up		(South Korea) Kang Wook-soon
3	6 May 2001	Macau Open	−11 (70-64-71-68=273)	1 stroke	(Scotland) Simon Yates
4	20 Oct 2002	Macau Open (2)	−7 (71-69-67-70=277)	Playoff	(Zimbabwe) Nick Price
5	26 Jan 2003	Caltex Masters^{1}	−10 (68-71-69-70=278)	1 stroke	(South Africa) Ernie Els
6	16 Nov 2003	Volvo China Open	−11 (67-69-69-72=277)	2 strokes	(Thailand) Thaworn Wiratchant

^{1}Co-sanctioned by the European Tour

Asian PGA Tour playoff record (1–0)

No.	Year	Tournament	Opponent	Result
1	2002	Macau Open	(Zimbabwe) Nick Price	Won with par on fifth extra hole

=== Canadian Tour wins (1) ===
No.	Date	Tournament	Winning score	Margin of victory	Runners-up
1	9 Jul 2000	Ontario Open Heritage Classic	−9 (69-68-67=204) (Note: Shortened to 54 holes due to weather.)	2 strokes	(United States) Jason Schultz, (United States) Todd Setsma, (United States) Ken Staton

=== Omega China Tour wins (6) ===
No.	Date	Tournament	Winning score	Margin of victory	Runner(s)-up
1	14 May 2006	Zhuhai Leg	+8 (75-74-78-69=296)	6 strokes	(China) Zheng Wengen
2	3 Sep 2006	Shanghai Leg	−6 (69-71-70-72=282)	Playoff	(China) Huang Mingjie
3	3 Jun 2007	Qingdao Leg	+6 (71-72-73-78=294)	2 strokes	(China) Chen Xiaoma, (China) Li Chao, (China) Wu Weihuang
4	24 Jun 2007	Guangzhou Leg	−9 (71-68-71-69=279)	5 strokes	(China) Yuan Hao
5	21 Oct 2007	Omega Golf Championship	−5 (70-77-69-67=283)	7 strokes	(China) Li Chao
6	16 Mar 2008	Guangzhou Leg (2)	−3 (72-72-68-73=285)	4 strokes	(Taiwan) Chan Yih-shin, (Taiwan) Hsu Mong-nan

=== Volvo China Tour wins (3) ===
- 1995 Volvo Open
- 1996 Blue Ribbon Open
- 1997 Hugo Boss Open

=== Other wins (5) ===
- 1995 (2) Volvo Masters of Malaysia
- 1996 (2) Volvo Masters of Malaysia, Volvo Masters of Thailand
- 1998 (1) Hong Kong PGA Championship
- 2010 China Tour – PGA Championship

=== European Senior Tour wins (1) ===
No.	Date	Tournament	Winning score	Margin of victory	Runner-up
1	5 Jun 2016	SSE Enterprise Wales Senior Open	−12 (67-69-62=198)	3 strokes	(England) Paul Broadhurst

== Results in major championships ==
Tournament	2004
Masters Tournament	CUT

CUT = missed the halfway cut
Note: Zhang only played in the Masters Tournament.

== Results in World Golf Championships ==
Tournament	2004	2005	2006	2007	2008	2009	2010	2011	2012	2013	2014
Match Play											
Championship	68										
Invitational											
Champions						T66					T64

Did not play

"T" = Tied
Note that the HSBC Champions did not become a WGC event until 2009.

== Team appearances ==
- World Cup (representing China): 1995, 1996, 2001, 2007, 2008, 2009
- Alfred Dunhill Cup (representing China): 1998, 1999, 2000
- Dynasty Cup (representing Asia): 2003 (winners), 2005 (winners)
- Royal Trophy (representing Asia): 2006

== See also ==
- List of golfers with most Asian Tour wins
