= Simon Yates (golfer) =

Scottish professional golfer (born 1970)

Personal information
- Nationality: Scotland
- Born: 16 March 1970 (age 56) Glasgow, Scotland
- Height: 1.70 m (5 ft 7 in)
- Weight: 77 kg (170 lb; 12.1 st)

Career
- Sport: Golf
- Turned professional: 1989
- Current tour: Asian Tour
- Former tours: European Tour; OneAsia Tour; TPC Tour
- Professional wins: 7

Number of wins by tour
- Asian Tour: 2
- Other: 5

Simon Yates (born 16 March 1970) is a Scottish professional golfer.

== Professional career ==
In 1989, Yates turned professional. He relocated to Thailand after holidaying in Asia and deciding to base himself in the region. He has played on the Asian Tour since its first official season in 1995. He placed third on the Asian Tour Order of Merit in both 1999 and 2004 and was one of the first ten players to reach career earnings of a million U.S. dollars on the tour. Although he has only won twice, he has 14 runner-up finishes on the Asian Tour.

== Professional wins (7) ==
=== Asian Tour wins (2) ===
No.	Date	Tournament	Winning score	Margin of victory	Runner(s)-up
1	9 Aug 1998	Sabah Masters	−10 (67-71-67-73=278)	1 stroke	(South Africa) Des Terblanche
2	23 May 2004	SK Telecom Open^{1}	−9 (70-69-70-70=279)	1 stroke	(Canada) Rick Gibson, (South Korea) Charlie Wi

^{1}Co-sanctioned by the Korean Tour

Asian Tour playoff record (0–4)

No.	Year	Tournament	Opponent(s)	Result
1	2001	SK Telecom Open	(South Korea) Kang Wook-soon, (South Korea) Charlie Wi	Wi won with birdie on seventh extra hole Yates eliminated by birdie on fifth hole
2	2002	Shinhan Donghae Open	(South Korea) Hur Suk-ho	Lost to birdie on second extra hole
3	2007	Midea China Classic	(Thailand) Chinnarat Phadungsil, (Thailand) Thaworn Wiratchant	Wiratchant won with birdie on fourth extra hole Yates eliminated by par on first hole
4	2009	King's Cup	(Taiwan) Chan Yih-shin, (England) Nick Redfern	Chan won with birdie on second extra hole

=== TPC Tour wins (2) ===
- 2003 Cotto Open
- 2004 Singha Southern Open

=== Volvo China Tour wins (1) ===
No.	Date	Tournament	Winning score	Margin of victory	Runner-up
1	22 Apr 1995	Coca-Cola Open	−4 (69-71=140)	1 stroke	(New Zealand) David Smail

=== Other wins (2) ===
- 1994 German PGA Championship

=== Japan PGA Senior Tour wins (1) ===
- 2025 PGA Senior Championship Tsuburaya Fields Cup

== Results in World Golf Championships ==
Tournament	2005
Match Play	
Championship	T43
Invitational	

Did not play

"T" = Tied
