= Thaworn Wiratchant =

Thai professional golfer (born 1966)

Thaworn Wiratchant ถาวร วิรัตน์จันทร์
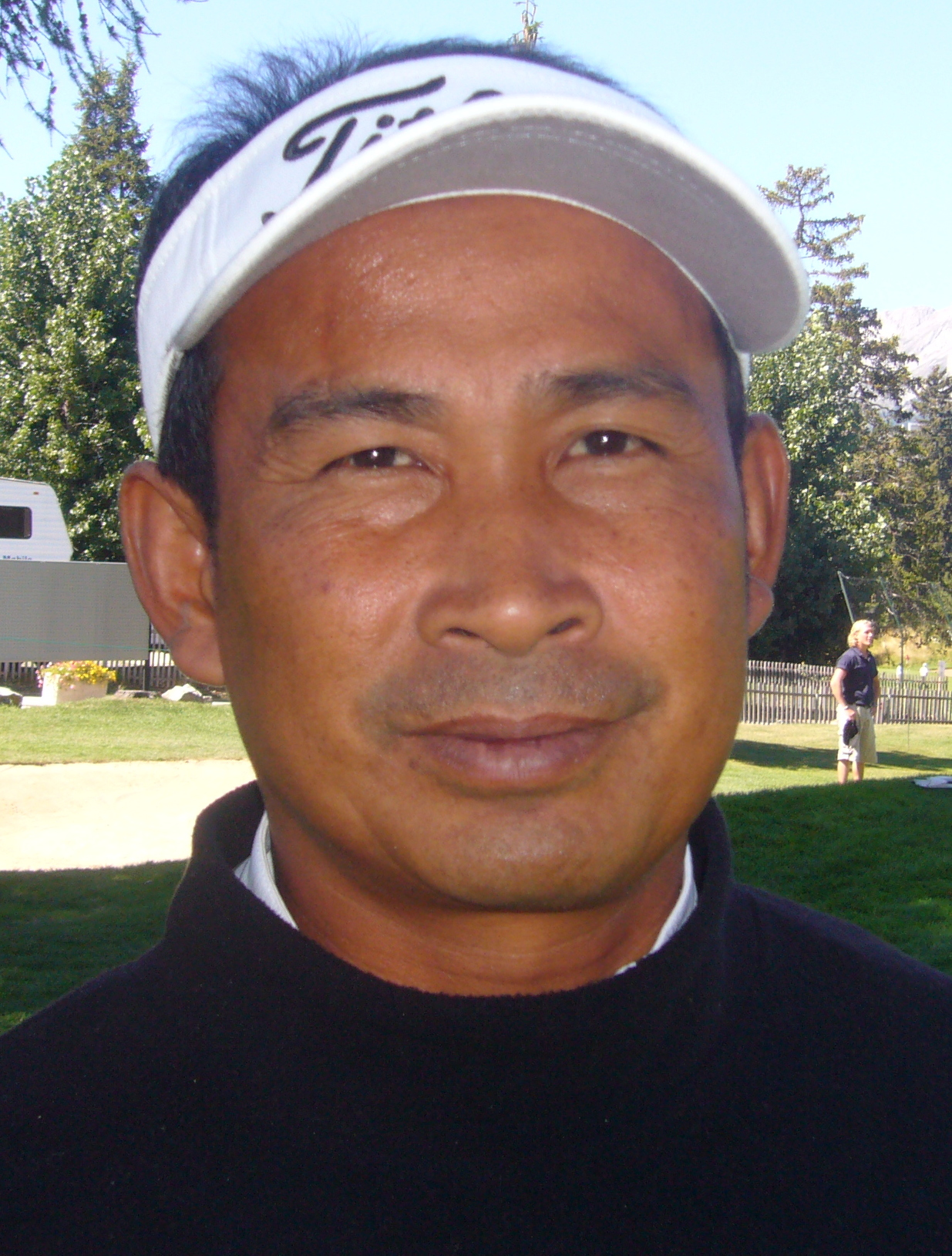

Personal information
- Nationality: Thailand
- Born: 28 December 1966 (age 59) Nakhon Pathom, Thailand
- Height: 5 ft 8 in (1.73 m)
- Weight: 150 lb (68 kg; 11 st)

Career
- Sport: Golf
- Turned professional: 1987
- Current tours: European Senior Tour; Japan PGA Senior Tour
- Former tours: European Tour; Asian Tour; OneAsia Tour; All Thailand Golf Tour; ASEAN PGA Tour
- Professional wins: 36
- Highest ranking: 68 (6 January 2013)

Number of wins by tour
- European Tour: 1
- Asian Tour: 18 (1st all-time)
- European Senior Tour: 2
- Other: 16

Best results in major championships
- Masters Tournament: CUT: 2013
- PGA Championship: DNP
- U.S. Open: DNP
- The Open Championship: T31: 2006

Achievements and awards
- Asian Tour Order of Merit winner: 2005, 2012
- Asian Tour Players' Player of the Year: 2005, 2012
- Japan PGA Senior Tour Order of Merit winner: 2019

Thaworn Wiratchant (born 28 December 1966) is a Thai professional golfer who plays on the Asian Tour where he holds the record for most victories, with 18 total wins.

== Professional career ==
Wiratchant's biggest win came in March 2005 when he won the Enjoy Jakarta Standard Chartered Indonesia Open. This event was co-sanctioned by the Asian Tour and the European Tour, meaning that Wiratchant became the second Thai after Thongchai Jaidee to win on the European Tour. He topped the Asian Tour money list in 2005, becoming the first player to win more than half a million U.S. dollars on that tour in a season. He also recorded what would have been the lowest aggregate score on the European Tour with a total of 255 strokes. However, this record is not considered official as preferred lies were in operation throughout the week.

Wiratchant won the Asian Tour money list again in 2012 after a solid season with three victories, including a playoff win over Scot Richie Ramsay at the Hero Indian Open.

=== Senior career ===
Wiratchant played in a number of events on the European Senior Tour in 2017, receiving an exemption for players aged exactly 50 who had previously won a European Tour event. In his second event on the tour, the WINSTONgolf Senior Open, he finished runner-up behind Phillip Price. He gained entry to the end-of-season MCB Tour Championship by being 23rd in the Order of Merit. Rounds of 66-65-62 gave him an eight strokes win over Mark McNulty. The win lifted him to 9th place on the end of season Order of Merit.

== Amateur wins ==
- 1987 Singapore Open Amateur Championship

== Professional wins (36) ==
=== European Tour wins (1) ===
No.	Date	Tournament	Winning score	Margin of victory	Runner-up
1	27 Mar 2005	Enjoy Jakarta Standard Chartered Indonesia Open^{1}	−25 (63-63-66-63=255)	5 strokes	(France) Raphaël Jacquelin

^{1}Co-sanctioned by the Asian Tour

=== Asian Tour wins (18) ===
No.	Date	Tournament	Winning score	Margin of victory	Runner(s)-up
1	17 Mar 1996	Sabah Masters	−6 (72-71-70-69=282)	2 strokes	(Taiwan) Lin Chih-chen, (Australia) Jeff Wagner
2	25 Jun 2001	Alcatel Singapore Open	−16 (68-69-68-67=272)	1 stroke	(Taiwan) Hsieh Yu-shu
3	13 Aug 2001	Volvo Masters of Malaysia	−17 (69-67-67-68=271)	3 strokes	(United States) Scott Kammann
4	19 Sep 2004	Mercuries Taiwan Masters	−5 (69-69-71-74=283)	2 strokes	(Taiwan) Chen Yuan-chi, (South Africa) Chris Williams
5	27 Mar 2005	Enjoy Jakarta Standard Chartered Indonesia Open^{1}	−25 (63-63-66-63=255)	5 strokes	(France) Raphaël Jacquelin
6	18 Sep 2005	Taiwan Open	−18 (73-65-68-64=270)	1 stroke	(Thailand) Chapchai Nirat
7	30 Oct 2005	Hero Honda Indian Open	−16 (68-66-68-70=272)	2 strokes	(India) Gaurav Ghei
8	20 Nov 2005	Carlsberg Masters Vietnam	−7 (72-66-72-71=281)	2 strokes	(England) Chris Rodgers
9	16 Sep 2007	Midea China Classic	−21 (65-63-68-67=263)	Playoff	(Thailand) Chinnarat Phadungsil, (Scotland) Simon Yates
10	8 Jun 2008	Bangkok Airways Open	−13 (66-69-68-68=271)	3 strokes	(Japan) Shintaro Kai
11	13 Sep 2009	Macau Open	−15 (67-68-66-68=269)	6 strokes	(India) Gaganjeet Bhullar
12	19 Sep 2010	Yeangder Tournament Players Championship	−10 (69-67-70=206) (Note: Shortened to 54 holes due to weather.)	1 stroke	(Thailand) Chinnarat Phadungsil
13	17 Jun 2012	Queen's Cup	−7 (70-67-72-68=277)	3 strokes	(Philippines) Juvic Pagunsan, (Bangladesh) Siddikur Rahman
14	8 Sep 2012	Worldwide Holdings Selangor Masters	−16 (66-69-68-69=272)	3 strokes	(India) Gaganjeet Bhullar
15	21 Oct 2012	Hero Indian Open (2)	−14 (69-68-67-66=270)	Playoff	(Scotland) Richie Ramsay
16	15 Sep 2013	Yeangder Tournament Players Championship (2)	−13 (69-67-71-68=275)	1 stroke	(United States) Chan Kim
17	8 Jun 2014	Queen's Cup (2)	−12 (71-68-67-66=272)	1 stroke	(Thailand) Poom Saksansin
18	30 Nov 2014	King's Cup	−20 (68-67-66-67=268)	2 strokes	(Australia) Andrew Dodt, (India) Anirban Lahiri

^{1}Co-sanctioned by the European Tour

Asian Tour playoff record (2–1)

No.	Year	Tournament	Opponents	Result
1	2007	Midea China Classic	(Thailand) Chinnarat Phadungsil, (Scotland) Simon Yates	Won with birdie on fourth extra hole Yates eliminated by par on first hole
2	2012	Hero Indian Open	(Scotland) Richie Ramsay	Won with bogey on first extra hole
3	2015	Ho Tram Open	(Spain) Sergio García, (Taiwan) Lin Wen-tang, (India) Himmat Rai	García won with par on second extra hole Lin and Wiratchant eliminated by birdie on first hole

=== OneAsia Tour wins (1) ===
No.	Date	Tournament	Winning score	Margin of victory	Runners-up
1	17 Jul 2011	Indonesia Open	−13 (68-68-66-73=275)	1 stroke	(South Korea) Choi Jin-ho, (New Zealand) Michael Hendry, (Indonesia) Rory Hie

=== All Thailand Golf Tour wins (8) ===
- 2001 TPC Championships
- 2003 Singha Pattaya Open
- 2004 Singha Pattaya Open
- 2007 Singha Masters
- 2010 Singha E-San Open^{1}
- 2014 Singha All Thailand Championship
- 2015 Singha E-San Open^{1}
- 2020 Thongchai Jaidee Foundation

^{1}Co-sanctioned by the ASEAN PGA Tour

=== ASEAN PGA Tour wins (4) ===
No.	Date	Tournament	Winning score	Margin of victory	Runner(s)-up
1	12 Jun 2009	Heritage Melaka Classic	−12 (69-69-70-68=276)	1 stroke	(Singapore) Lam Chih Bing
2	18 Jul 2010	Singha E-San Open^{1}	−12 (71-69-68-68=276)	Playoff	(Thailand) Namchok Tantipokhakul
3	6 May 2012	Luang Prabang Laos Open	−21 (69-63-68-67=267)	8 strokes	(Philippines) Jay Bayron
4	1 Mar 2015	Singha E-San Open^{1} (2)	−18 (67-68-66-69=270)	4 strokes	(Thailand) Piya Sawangarunporn, (Thailand) Namchok Tantipokhakul, (Thailand) Rattanon Wannasrichan

^{1}Co-sanctioned by the All Thailand Golf Tour

=== Omega China Tour wins (1) ===
No.	Date	Tournament	Winning score	Margin of victory	Runner-up
1	21 Jun 2009	Dongfeng Nissan Teana Golf Open	−20 (70-68-63-67=268)	1 stroke	(South Korea) Eom Jae-woong

=== European Senior Tour wins (2) ===
Legend
Tour Championships (1)
Other European Senior Tour (1)

No.	Date	Tournament	Winning score	Margin of victory	Runner(s)-up
1	10 Dec 2017	MCB Tour Championship	−23 (66-65-62=193)	8 strokes	(Republic of Ireland) Mark McNulty
2	10 Mar 2018	Sharjah Senior Golf Masters	−12 (68-65-71=204)	Playoff	(United States) Clark Dennis, (Australia) Peter Fowler

European Senior Tour playoff record (1–0)

No.	Year	Tournament	Opponents	Result
1	2018	Sharjah Senior Golf Masters	(United States) Clark Dennis, (Australia) Peter Fowler	Won with par on fourth extra hole Fowler eliminated by par on first hole

=== Japan PGA Senior Tour wins (4) ===
No.	Date	Tournament	Winning score	Margin of victory	Runner(s)-up
1	15 Sep 2018	Sevenhills Cup KBC Senior Open	−15 (65-64=129)	3 strokes	(Japan) Katsumi Kubo, (Thailand) Prayad Marksaeng
2	14 Sep 2019	Komatsu Open	−14 (69-68-65=202)	Playoff	(Thailand) Prayad Marksaeng
3	9 Nov 2019	Fujifilm Senior Championship	−16 (68-64-68=200)	6 strokes	(Japan) Toru Suzuki
4	5 Jun 2021	Sumaiida Cup Senior Tournament	−13 (64-69-70=203)	2 strokes	(Thailand) Prayad Marksaeng

== Results in major championships ==
Tournament	2006	2007	2008	2009	2010	2011	2012	2013
Masters Tournament								CUT
The Open Championship	T31							CUT

Note: Wiratchant never played in the U.S. Open or the PGA Championship.

Did not play

CUT = missed the half-way cut
"T" = tied

== Results in World Golf Championships ==
Tournament	2006	2007	2008	2009	2010	2011	2012	2013
Match Play								
Championship	T54							
Invitational								
Champions					T60		T39	T53

Did not play

"T" = Tied
Note that the HSBC Champions did not become a WGC event until 2009.

== Team appearances ==
Amateur

- Eisenhower Trophy (representing Thailand): 1984

Professional

- World Cup (representing Thailand): 1989, 1990
- Dunhill Cup (representing Thailand): 1991, 1992
- Dynasty Cup (representing Asia): 2003 (winners), 2005 (winners)
- Royal Trophy (representing Asia): 2006, 2007
- Dongfeng Nissan Cup (representing China): 2013

== See also ==
- List of golfers with most Asian Tour wins
