= Omega China Tour =

Professional golf tour

- Sport: Golf
- Founded: 2005
- Founder: China Golf Association
- First season: 2005
- Folded: 2009
- Country: Based in China
- Most titles: Order of Merit titles: (China) Li Chao (2); Tournament wins: (China) Li Chao (8)
- Related competitions: China Tour; PGA Tour China; Volvo China Tour

The Omega China Tour was a China-based men's professional golf tour that ran from 2005 to 2009.

== History ==
The tour was created to encourage the development players who intended to move up to the Asian Tour or other major international tours, and also to help accelerate the development of golf in the People's Republic of China, following the sports reintroduction to the country in the 1980s, having been absent during the early communist era.

Launched by the China Golf Association in 2005, the tour began as the China Tour, with four three-day tournaments, each with a minimum purse of CN¥ 800,000 (or US$100,000). Omega SA became the title sponsor of the tour in 2006, being renamed as the Omega China Tour.

The number of tournaments increased to six four-day tournaments in 2006, and then eight in 2007. It was initially planned to have ten tournaments in 2008, but this was not possible, and there were again eight events. There were four events in 2009 after which the tour folded.

== Order of Merit winners ==
Year	Winner	Prize money (CN¥)
2009	(Australia) Kurt Barnes	264,750
2008	(China) Liao Guiming	375,125
2007	(China) Li Chao (2)	652,125
2006	(China) Zhang Lianwei	540,000
2005	(China) Li Chao	405,300
