= Mo Joong-kyung =

South Korean professional golfer (born 1971)

Personal information
- Nationality: South Korea
- Born: 23 August 1971 (age 55) Seoul, South Korea

Career
- Sport: Golf
- College: University of Nevada, Reno
- Turned professional: 1995
- Current tour: Korean Tour
- Former tour: Asian Tour
- Professional wins: 7

Number of wins by tour
- Asian Tour: 2
- Other: 5

Achievements and awards
- Korean Tour Rookie of the Year: 1997

Mo Joong-kyung (Korean: 모중경; born 23 August 1971) is a professional golfer from South Korea who currently plays on the Asian Tour, where he has won twice.

== Career ==
Mo was born in Seoul and turned professional in 1995.

After turning professional in 1995, Mo decided to stay and play mainly in South Korea to be close to his family. He has won five events on the Korean Tour, with his best year coming in 2004, which was the first year he earned six figures in season-long earnings.

Mo has also had some success on the Asian Tour. He won the 1996 Guam Open by three strokes over three players. In 1997 he finished a distant runner-up to Tiger Woods at the Asian Honda Classic. He maintained full-time status for many years afterwards but would not win again until the 2008 Singha Thailand PGA Championship. He defeated seasoned campaigners Juvic Pagunsan and hometown favorite Prayad Marksaeng down the stretch giving him the biggest victory of his career. He credited the victory to his hard work and self-belief in Chiang Rai. Later in the year he recorded a top-10 at the Volvo Masters of Asia. Overall 2008 would be his most successful year on the Asian Tour.

Mo represented Asia in 2005 in the Dynasty Cup where he and his Asian team were victorious.

== Personal life ==
Mo currently resides in his place of birth Seoul with his wife and one child.

== Professional wins (7) ==
=== Asian Tour wins (2) ===
No.	Date	Tournament	Winning score	Margin of victory	Runner(s)-up
1	12 May 1996	Guam Open	−1 (77-73-70-67=287)	3 strokes	(Australia) Don Fardon, (United States) Aaron Meeks, (Australia) Jeff Wagner
2	29 Jun 2008	Singha Thailand PGA Championship	−21 (69-64-69-65=267)	3 strokes	(Philippines) Juvic Pagunsan

Asian Tour playoff record (0–1)

No.	Year	Tournament	Opponent	Result
1	2004	Volkswagen Masters-China	(India) Rahil Gangjee	Lost to par on first extra hole

=== Korean Tour wins (5) ===
No.	Date	Tournament	Winning score	Margin of victory	Runner(s)-up
1	9 Sep 2000	Chungcheong Open	−13 (71-70-71-63=275)	7 strokes	(South Korea) Choi Gwang-soo, (South Korea) Yang Yong-eun
2	10 Nov 2002	KTRD Open	−7 (69-73-69-70=281)	1 stroke	(South Korea) Choi Sang-ho, (South Korea) Kang Wook-soon, (South Korea) Lee Jun-young
3	9 Jul 2004	Sports Toto Open	−12 (70-71-69-66=276)	1 stroke	(South Korea) Jang Ik-jae
4	30 Jul 2006	SBS Gaya Open	−15 (68-70-67-68=273)	1 stroke	(South Korea) Bae Sang-moon, (South Korea) Jun Tae-hyun, (South Korea) Park Do-kyu
5	15 May 2016	Maeil Dairies Open	−18 (69-67-68-66=270)	3 strokes	(South Korea) Kang Kyung-nam

== Team appearances ==
- Alfred Dunhill Cup (representing South Korea): 1997
- Dynasty Cup (representing Asia): 2005 (winners)
