= Open golf tournament =

Type of golf tournament

An open golf tournament usually refers to a golf tournament in which all golfers may compete regardless of their professional or amateur status. Often there will be certain restrictions, commonly based on ability. Some amateur-only tournaments are also described as open, although by definition professional golfers are excluded.

== History ==
The descriptor open is used in a number of sports, and especially in golf, to describe a tournament that is "open" — in theory to all — rather than being closed, i.e. one that is restricted to a particular group. Thus, an amateur tournament, e.g. the U.S. Amateur, is not by definition "open", because it is closed to professional golfers; however many are titled as such since they are open to all amateurs, e.g. the English Men's Open Amateur Stroke Play Championship for the Brabazon Trophy. The first precise usage of the adjective “open” in golf was in 1861 when the Prestwick Golf Club "opened" its Medal competition (launched the previous year for professionals only) to amateurs as well; ever since, The Open Championship has been open to all. Any golfer can, in theory, play in The Open either by invitation or by various forms of qualification. In practice, the event is a professional tournament in which a small number of the world’s leading amateurs also play, by invitation or qualification.

Over time the descriptor "open" has been extended to include the premier national tournaments of many countries (starting with the U.S. Open in 1895) and also (mainly in the United States) to some other tournaments, e.g. the Buick Open.

== Principal national "Opens" ==
This is a list of the national Opens that have featured on the principal tours.

Legend
Currently played on the respective tour
Formerly included on the respective tour

=== Men's tournaments ===
National Opens
Tour		MAJ	PGAT	EUR	JPN	ASA	AFR	ANZ	KFT	CHA	ONE	KOR	PGATLA	TLA	EPT	ALP	PGT	NGL	CHN	PGTI	ATGT
North America
(The Bahamas)	Bahamas Open																				
(Canada)	Canadian Open																				
(Costa Rica)	Costa Rica Open																				
(Dominican Republic)	Dominican Republic Open																				
(Guatemala)	Guatemala Open																				
(Honduras)	Honduras Open																				
(Mexico)	Mexican Open																				
(Panama)	Panama Open																				
(Puerto Rico)	Puerto Rico Open																				
(United States)	U.S. Open																				
Europe
(United Kingdom)	The Open Championship																				
(Austria)	Austrian Open																				
(Belgium)	Belgian Open																				
(Cyprus)	Cyprus Open																				
(Czech Republic)	Czech Open																				
(Denmark)	Danish Open																				
(Netherlands)	Dutch Open																				
(England)	English Open																				
(Finland)	Finnish Open																				
(France)	French Open																				
(Germany)	German Open																				
(Republic of Ireland)	Irish Open																				
(Italy)	Italian Open																				
(Jersey)	Jersey Open																				
(Luxembourg)	Luxembourg Open																				
(Northern Ireland)	Northern Ireland Open																				
(Norway)	Norwegian Open																				
(Poland)	Polish Open																				
(Portugal)	Portuguese Open																				
(Russia)	Russian Open																				
(Scotland)	Scottish Open																				
(Slovenia)	Slovenian Open																				
(Spain)	Spanish Open																				
(Switzerland)	Swiss Open																				
(Turkey)	Turkish Open																				
(Wales)	Wales Open																				
Asia
(Azerbaijan)	Azerbaijan Open																				
(Bangladesh)	Bangladesh Open																				
(Brunei)	Brunei Open																				
(Cambodia)	Cambodian Open																				
(China)	China Open																				
(Hong Kong)	Hong Kong Open																				
(India)	Indian Open																				
(Indonesia)	Indonesia Open																				
(Japan)	Japan Open																				
(Jordan)	Jordan Open																				
(Kazakhstan)	Kazakhstan Open																				
(South Korea)	Korea Open																				
(Macau)	Macau Open																				
(Malaysia)	Malaysian Open																				
(Myanmar)	Myanmar Open																				
(Oman)	Oman Open																				
(Pakistan)	Pakistan Open																				
(Philippines)	Philippine Open																				
(Saudi Arabia)	Saudi Open																				
(Singapore)	Singapore Open																				
(Taiwan)	Taiwan Open																				
(Thailand)	Thailand Open																				
(Vietnam)	Vietnam Open																				
Oceania
(Australia)	Australian Open																				
(Fiji)	Fiji Open																				
(Guam)	Guam Open																				
(New Zealand)	New Zealand Open																				
(Papua New Guinea)	Papua New Guinea Open																				
(French Polynesia)	Tahiti Open																				
Africa
(Botswana)	Botswana Open																				
(Egypt)	Egyptian Open																				
(Ivory Coast)	Ivory Coast Open																				
(Kenya)	Kenya Open																				
(Mauritius)	Mauritius Open																				
(Morocco)	Moroccan Open																				
(Namibia)	Namibia Open																				
(Nigeria)	Nigerian Open																				
(Rwanda)	Rwanda Open																				
(South Africa)	South African Open																				
(Eswatini)	Swaziland Open																				
(Tunisia)	Tunisian Open																				
(Zambia)	Zambia Open																				
(Zimbabwe)	Zimbabwe Open																				
South America
(Argentina)	Argentine Open																				
(Brazil)	Brazil Open																				
(Chile)	Chile Open																				
(Colombia)	Colombian Open																				
(Ecuador)	Ecuador Open																				
(Peru)	Peru Open																				
(Venezuela)	Venezuela Open																				

=== Women's tournaments ===
Women's National Opens
Tour		LPGA	LET	WPGA	JLPGA	KLPGA	CLPGA	LAGT	AFR	LETAS
North America
(United States)	U.S. Women's Open									
(Canada)	Canadian Women's Open									
British Isles
(United Kingdom)	Women's British Open									
(England)	Women's English Open									
(Republic of Ireland)	Women's Irish Open									
(Guernsey)	Ladies Guernsey Open									
(Northern Ireland)	Northern Ireland Ladies Open									
(Scotland)	Women's Scottish Open									
(Wales)	Women's Welsh Open									
Europe
(Austria)	Austrian Ladies Open									
(Belgium)	Belgian Ladies Open									
(Czech Republic)	Czech Ladies Open									
(Denmark)	Danish Ladies Open									
(Netherlands)	Dutch Ladies Open									
(Finland)	Ladies Finnish Open									
(France)	Ladies French Open									
(Germany)	Ladies German Open									
(Italy)	Ladies Italian Open									
(Norway)	Ladies Norwegian Open									
(Portugal)	Ladies Open of Portugal									
(Slovakia)	Ladies Slovak Open									
(Slovenia)	Slovenian Ladies Open									
(Spain)	Ladies Spanish Open									
(Sweden)	Women's Swedish Open									
(Switzerland)	Ladies Swiss Open									
Asia
(Brunei)	Brunei Ladies Open									
(China)	Women's China Open									
(Hong Kong)	Hong Kong Ladies Open									
(India)	Women's Indian Open									
(Indonesia)	Indonesia Women's Open									
(Japan)	Japan Women's Open									
(South Korea)	Korea Women's Open									
(Macau)	Macau Ladies Open									
(Malaysia)	Malaysia Ladies Open									
(Philippines)	Philippines Ladies Open									
(Singapore)	Singapore Ladies Open									
(Taiwan)	Taiwan Ladies Open									
(Thailand)	Thailand Ladies Open									
Australasia
(Australia)	Women's Australian Open									
(New Zealand)	New Zealand Women's Open									
MENA
(Jordan)	Jordan Mixed Open									
(Qatar)	Qatar Ladies Open									
(Turkey)	Turkish Ladies Open									
Africa
(Kenya)	Kenya Ladies Open									
(South Africa)	South African Women's Open									
(Zambia)	Zambia Ladies Open									
