= Myanmar Open =

Golf tournament

Leopalace21 Myanmar Open
Tournament information
- Location: Yangon, Myanmar
- Established: 1996
- Course: Pun Hlaing Golf Club
- Par: 71
- Length: 7,103 yards (6,495 m)
- Tours: Asian Tour; Japan Golf Tour
- Format: Stroke play
- Prize fund: US$750,000
- Month played: January
- Final year: 2018

Tournament record score
- Aggregate: 264 Tetsuji Hiratsuka (2010); 264 Shaun Norris (2016)
- To par: −24 as above

Final champion
- (United States) Paul Peterson
- Location in Myanmar

The Myanmar Open was a professional golf tournament on the Asian Tour. It was founded in 1996, and was played every year until 2005. Between 2006 and 2015 it was only contested in 2010, 2012 and 2013.

The tournament returned in February 2016, sponsored by Leopalace21 and co-sanctioned by the Asian Tour and Japan Golf Tour.

== Winners ==
| Year | Tour(s) (Note: ASA − Asian Tour; JPN − Japan Golf Tour.) | Winner | Score | To par | Margin of victory | Runner(s)-up |
Leopalace21 Myanmar Open
| 2018 | ASA, JPN | (United States) Paul Peterson | 271 | −13 | 2 strokes | (Japan) Tomoyo Ikemura (Japan) Satoshi Kodaira |
| 2017 | ASA, JPN | (Australia) Todd Sinnott | 270 | −14 | 3 strokes | (Spain) Carlos Pigem |
| 2016 | ASA, JPN | (South Africa) Shaun Norris | 264 | −24 | 4 strokes | (South Korea) Park Jun-won (Japan) Azuma Yano |
2014–15: No tournament
Zaykabar Myanmar Open
| 2013 | ASA | (Thailand) Chawalit Plaphol | 270 | −18 | 1 stroke | (Sri Lanka) Mithun Perera |
| 2012 | ASA | (Australia) Kieran Pratt | 273 | −15 | Playoff (Note: Pratt won with birdie on second extra hole; Aphibarnrat eliminated by par on first hole) | (Thailand) Kiradech Aphibarnrat (Australia) Adam Blyth |
2011: No tournament
Air Bagan Myanmar Open
| 2010 | ASA | (Japan) Tetsuji Hiratsuka | 264 | −24 | 10 strokes | (Thailand) Prayad Marksaeng |
Myanmar Open
2006–2009: No tournament
| 2005 | ASA | (Australia) Scott Strange | 277 | −11 | 2 strokes | (Canada) Rick Gibson |
| 2004 | ASA | (Thailand) Thongchai Jaidee (2) | 276 | −12 | 3 strokes | (United States) Andrew Pitts |
| 2003 | ASA | (Taiwan) Lin Keng-chi | 275 | −12 | 3 strokes | (Thailand) Thongchai Jaidee |
London Myanmar Open
| 2002 | ASA | (Thailand) Thongchai Jaidee | 277 | −11 | Playoff (Note: Jaidee won with par on first extra hole) | (United States) Edward Loar |
| 2001 | ASA | (United States) Anthony Kang | 282 | −6 | 2 strokes | (South Korea) Charlie Wi |
| 2000 | ASA | (South Africa) James Kingston | 269 | −19 | 10 strokes | (South Africa) Craig Kamps |
| 1999 | ASA | (Taiwan) Wang Ter-chang | 271 | −17 | 3 strokes | (Philippines) Frankie Miñoza (Japan) Koichi Nogami |
| 1998 | ASA | (Pakistan) Taimur Hussain | 280 | −8 | 1 stroke | (China) Zhang Lianwei |
| 1997 | ASA | (Thailand) Boonchu Ruangkit (2) | 273 | −15 | Playoff (Note: Ruangkit won with birdie on first extra hole) | (Australia) John Senden |
Myanmar Open
| 1996 | ASA | (Thailand) Boonchu Ruangkit | 293 | +5 | Playoff (Note: Ruangkit won with par on first extra hole) | (Australia) Jeff Senior |

== See also ==
- Open golf tournament
