= Asian Matchplay Championship =

Tournament information
- Location: Southeast Asia
- Established: 1996
- Course: Mission Hills Golf Club
- Tour: Asian Tour
- Format: Match play
- Prize fund: US$265,000
- Month played: December
- Final year: 1998

Tournament record score
- Score: 3 and 1 Jeev Milkha Singh (1996)

Final champion
- (United States) Gerry Norquist

Location map
- Location in China Location in Guangdong

The Asian Matchplay Championship was a professional match play golf tournament. It was the season ending event in each of the first four seasons of the Omega Tour, now known as the Asian Tour. It also included a pairs competition, the Hugo Boss Foursomes, played using the alternate shot format.

It was hosted at a different venue every season. After the inaugural event, which was played in January, it was held in December each season. The tournament was sponsored by Volvo between 1996 and 1998, when it was titled as the Volvo Asian Matchplay.

The limited field was predominantly made up of winners of the major tournaments on the Omega Tour and leading players from the Order of Merit that season, with invitations also issued to the leading players from the Asia Golf Circuit, Japan Golf Tour, PGA Tour of Australasia and Southern Africa Tour.

== Winners ==
Year	Winner	Score	Runner-up	Venue	Ref.
Volvo Asian Matchplay
1998	(United States) Gerry Norquist	2 and 1	(United States) Eric Meeks	Mission Hills	
1997	(South Africa) Des Terblanche	Concession (Note: Partridge conceded on the 27th hole due to an arm injury; Terblanche was 2 up at the time.)	(Australia) Brett Partridge	Mimosa	
1996 (Dec)	(China) Zhang Lianwei	1 up	(South Korea) Kang Wook-soon	Emeralda	
Asian Matchplay Championship
1996 (Jan)	(India) Jeev Milkha Singh	3 and 1	(Thailand) Boonchu Ruangkit	St. Elena	
