= Jeev Milkha Singh =

Indian professional golfer (born 1971)

Jeev Milkha Singh Rathore
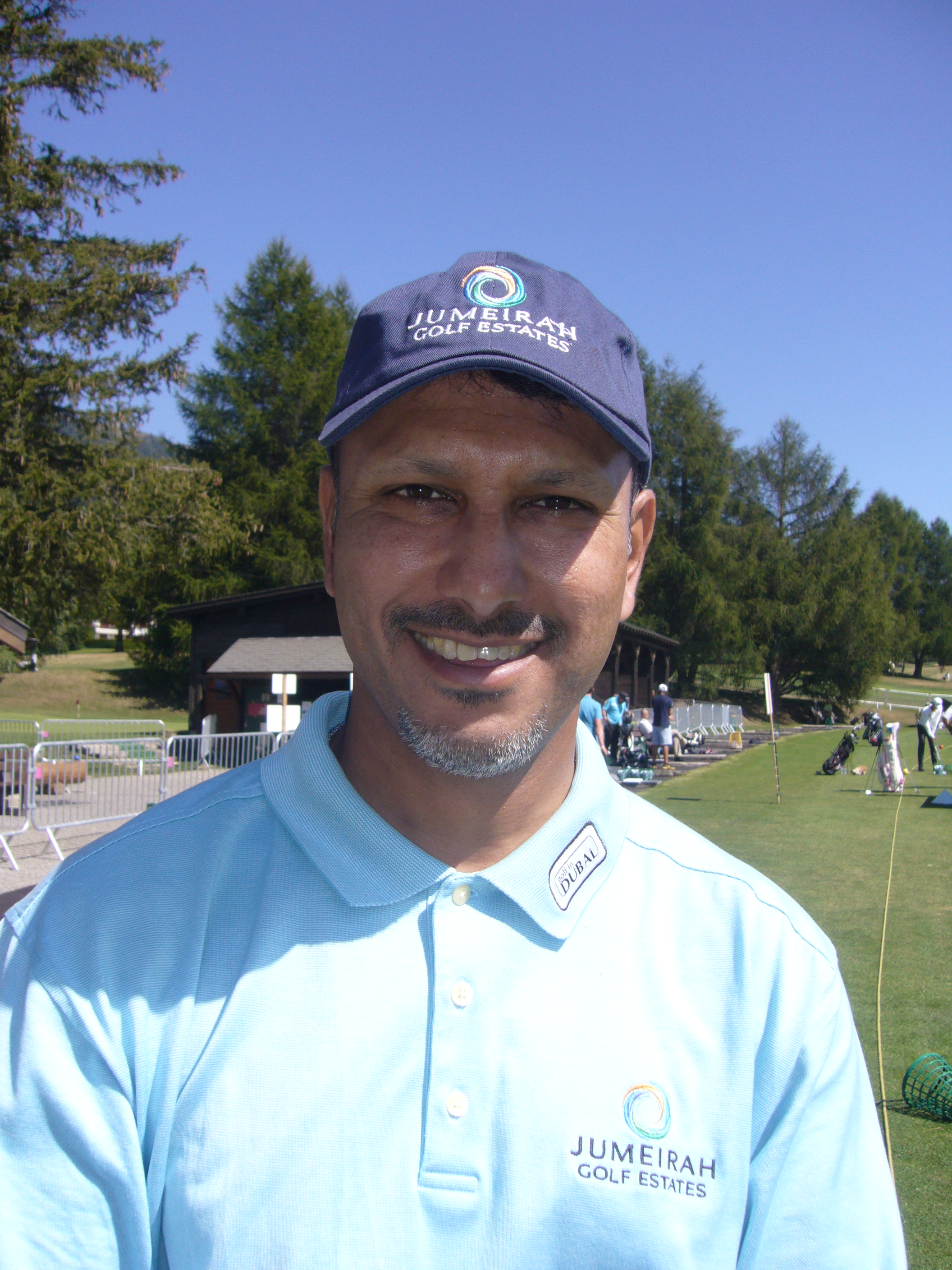
- Singh at the 2009 Omega European Masters

Personal information
- Nationality: India
- Born: 15 December 1971 (age 54)
- Height: 6 ft 0 in (1.83 m)
- Spouse: Kudrat (m. 2008)
- Children: 1

Career
- Sport: Golf
- College: Abilene Christian University
- Turned professional: 1993
- Current tours: European Senior Tour; Asian Tour
- Former tours: PGA Tour; European Tour; Japan Golf Tour
- Professional wins: 21

Number of wins by tour
- European Tour: 4
- Japan Golf Tour: 4
- Asian Tour: 6
- Other: 8

Best results in major championships
- Masters Tournament: T25: 2008
- PGA Championship: T9: 2008
- U.S. Open: T36: 2007
- The Open Championship: T69: 2012

Achievements and awards
- Arjuna Award: 1999
- Asian Tour Order of Merit winner: 2006, 2008
- Asian Tour Players' Player of the Year: 2006, 2008
- Padma Shri: 2007

Jeev Milkha Singh (born 15 December 1971) is an Indian professional golfer who became the first player from India to join the European Tour in 1998. He has won four events on the European Tour, becoming the most successful Indian on tour. He was the first Indian golfer to break into the top 100 of the Official World Golf Ranking in October 2006. The Government of India awarded him the civilian honour of Padma Shri in 2007. He is also the recipient of 1999 Arjuna Award.

== Early life ==
Singh was born on 15 December 1971 to Indian Olympic athlete Milkha Singh and Nirmal Saini, former captain of the Indian women's volleyball team. Singh attended Bishop Cotton School in Shimla and later went to Abilene Christian University in the United States, obtaining a degree in business and international studies in 1996.

Singh won the NCAA Division II individual golf championship in 1993 in addition to a number of amateur tournaments in the U.S.

== Professional career ==
Singh turned professional in 1993 and his first professional win was at the 1993 Southern Oklahoma State Open, a minor local event. He played mainly in Asia, where he was a regular winner in the mid-1990s. In 1997 he finished seventh at the European Tour qualifying school, and joined the tour the following year.

He became the third golfer to receive Arjuna Award in 1999.

His best season in Europe until 2006 was in 1999, when he came 50th on the Order of Merit. He struggled with injury in the early years of the new millennium. In April 2006 he won the Volvo China Open, becoming the second Indian player to win on the European Tour after Arjun Atwal. He also won the season ending Volvo Masters, which elevated him to a final position of 16th on the Order of Merit. He finished 2006 as the winner of the Asian Tour Order of Merit and capped his season with a pair of back to back wins in Japan to become the first Indian to make the top 50 of the Official World Golf Ranking. In 2007 he became the first Indian golfer to participate in the Masters Tournament. In August 2008, Singh achieved the highest ranking for an Indian in any major event at the 2008 PGA Championship in Oakland Hills, finishing at T9, making him arguably India's best golfer ever.

Singh finished the 2008 European Tour season ranked 12th on the Order of Merit, and after winning the Barclays Singapore Open won his second Order of Merit title on the Asian Tour.

In 2009, Singh finished the WGC-CA Championship in fourth place, after leading round one.

Singh played on the Nationwide Tour in 2003. He played on the PGA Tour from 2007 to 2010, where his best finish was 4th place at the 2009 WGC-CA Championship.

Singh received India's fourth highest civil honour, the Padma Shri, in 2007.

On 15 July 2012, Singh beat Francesco Molinari in a sudden-death playoff to win the Aberdeen Asset Management Scottish Open, the week before the 2012 Open Championship. The win secured Singh a spot in the 2012 Open Championship at Royal Lytham & St Annes Golf Club as a result of finishing as the highest non-qualifier at the event. The win was also Singh's fourth career victory on the European Tour and moved him ahead of Arjun Atwal, making him the most successful Indian golfer in European Tour history.

== Personal life ==
Singh lives in Chandigarh with wife Kudrat and their son.

== Awards and honors ==
- In 1999, Singh is also the recipient of Arjuna Award
- In 2007, the Government of India awarded him the civilian honour of Padma Shri

== Amateur wins ==
- 1993 NCAA Division II Individual Championship

== Professional wins (21) ==
=== European Tour wins (4) ===
Legend
Tour Championships (1)
Other European Tour (3)

No.	Date	Tournament	Winning score	To par	Margin of victory	Runner(s)-up
1	16 Apr 2006	Volvo China Open^{1}	72-69-67-70=278	−10	1 stroke	(Spain) Gonzalo Fernández-Castaño
2	29 Oct 2006	Volvo Masters	71-71-68-72=282	−2	1 stroke	(England) Luke Donald, (Spain) Sergio García, (Republic of Ireland) Pádraig Harrington
3	8 Jun 2008	Bank Austria GolfOpen	64-63-71=198 (Note: Shortened to 54 holes due to weather.)	−15	1 stroke	(England) Simon Wakefield
4	15 Jul 2012	Aberdeen Asset Management Scottish Open	66-70-68-67=271	−17	Playoff	(Italy) Francesco Molinari

^{1}Co-sanctioned by the Asian Tour

European Tour playoff record (1–1)

No.	Year	Tournament	Opponent	Result
1	2008	Ballantine's Championship	(Northern Ireland) Graeme McDowell	Lost to birdie on third extra hole
2	2012	Aberdeen Asset Management Scottish Open	(Italy) Francesco Molinari	Won with birdie on first extra hole

=== Japan Golf Tour wins (4) ===
Legend
Japan majors (2)
Other Japan Golf Tour (2)

No.	Date	Tournament	Winning score	To par	Margin of victory	Runner(s)-up
1	26 Nov 2006	Casio World Open	66-69-69-68=272	−16	2 strokes	(New Zealand) David Smail
2	3 Dec 2006	Golf Nippon Series JT Cup	67-65-67-70=269	−11	1 stroke	(Japan) Nobuhiro Masuda
3	27 Jul 2008	Nagashima Shigeo Invitational Sega Sammy Cup	67-74-68-66=275	−13	2 strokes	(Japan) Sushi Ishigaki
4	7 Dec 2008	Golf Nippon Series JT Cup (2)	64-70-68-66=268	−12	2 strokes	(Australia) Brendan Jones, (New Zealand) David Smail, (Japan) Taichi Teshima

Japan Golf Tour playoff record (0–1)

No.	Year	Tournament	Opponent	Result
1	1999	Kirin Open	(South Korea) K. J. Choi	Lost to par on first extra hole

=== Asian Tour wins (6) ===
No.	Date	Tournament	Winning score	To par	Margin of victory	Runner(s)-up
1	17 Dec 1995	Philippine Classic	65-73-72-73=283	−5	1 stroke	(Thailand) Preecha Senaprom
2	21 Jan 1996 (1995 season)	Asian Matchplay Championship	3 and 1			(Thailand) Boonchu Ruangkit
3	1 Sep 1996	Philip Morris Asian Cup	66-66-65-65=262	−26	6 strokes	(South Korea) Kang Wook-soon
4	17 Oct 1999	Lexus International	69-69-65-72=275	−13	Playoff	(Pakistan) Taimur Hussain, (Myanmar) Zaw Moe
5	16 Apr 2006	Volvo China Open^{1}	72-69-67-70=278	−10	1 stroke	(Spain) Gonzalo Fernández-Castaño
6	16 Nov 2008	Barclays Singapore Open	73-68-67-69=277	−7	1 stroke	(South Africa) Ernie Els, (Republic of Ireland) Pádraig Harrington

^{1}Co-sanctioned by the European Tour

Asian Tour playoff record (1–3)

No.	Year	Tournament	Opponent(s)	Result
1	1997	Ericsson Asia-Pacific Masters	(Australia) Darren Cole	Lost to par on first extra hole
2	1998	Thailand Open	(South Africa) James Kingston	Lost to par on first extra hole
3	1999	Lexus International	(Pakistan) Taimur Hussain, (Myanmar) Zaw Moe	Won with birdie on third extra hole Hussain eliminated by par on first hole
4	2008	Ballantine's Championship	(Northern Ireland) Graeme McDowell	Lost to birdie on third extra hole

=== Korean Tour wins (1) ===
No.	Date	Tournament	Winning score	To par	Margin of victory	Runner-up
1	11 Sep 1994	Shinhan Donghae Open	73-71-66-73=283	−5	4 strokes	(United States) Tom Pernice Jr.

Korean Tour playoff record (0–1)

No.	Year	Tournament	Opponent	Result
1	2008	Ballantine's Championship	(Northern Ireland) Graeme McDowell	Lost to birdie on third extra hole

=== Indian Golf Premier League wins (1) ===
No.	Date	Tournament	Winning score	To par	Margin of victory	Runner-up
1	25 Dec 2025	IGPL Invitational	64-69-65=198	−15	1 stroke	(India) Aryan Roopa Anand

=== Other wins (6) ===
- 1993 (2) Southern Oklahoma State Open, Bukit Kiara Golf Championship (Malaysia)
- 1994 (1) Northern Indian Open
- 1995 (3) Thailand PGA Championship, Mahindra BPGC Open (India), Toyota Crown Open (Thailand)

== Results in major championships ==
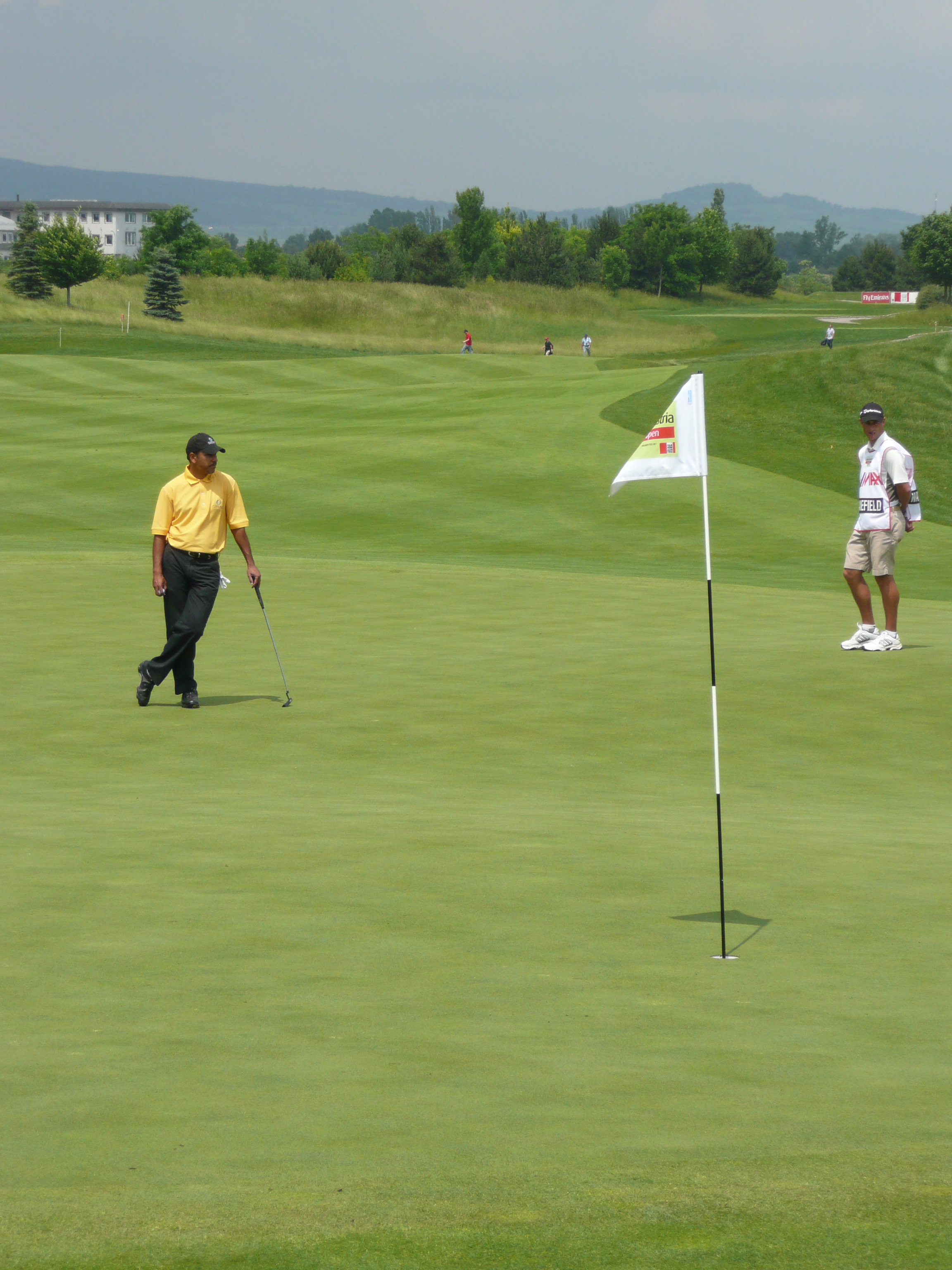
Singh at the 2008 Bank Austria GolfOpen

Tournament	2002	2003	2004	2005	2006	2007	2008	2009	2010	2011	2012	2013	2014	2015	2016
Masters Tournament						T37	T25	CUT							
U.S. Open	T62				T59	T36		CUT							CUT
The Open Championship						CUT					T69				
PGA Championship						CUT	T9	T67			CUT				

Top 10
Did not play

CUT = missed the half-way cut
"T" = tied

=== Summary ===
Tournament	Wins	2nd	3rd	Top-5	Top-10	Top-25	Events	Cuts made
Masters Tournament	0	0	0	0	0	1	3	2
U.S. Open	0	0	0	0	0	0	5	3
The Open Championship	0	0	0	0	0	0	2	1
PGA Championship	0	0	0	0	1	1	4	2
Totals	0	0	0	0	1	2	14	8

- Most consecutive cuts made – 4 (2002 U.S. Open – 2007 U.S. Open)
- Longest streak of top-10s – 1

== Results in The Players Championship ==
Tournament	2009
The Players Championship	T64

"T" indicates a tie for a place

== Results in World Golf Championships ==
Tournament	2007	2008	2009	2010	2011	2012
Match Play	R64		R64	R16		
Championship	T28	T26	4			
Invitational	T51		T64			T67
Champions			T33		T23	T46

Top 10
Did not play

QF, R16, R32, R64 = Round in which player lost in match play
"T" = tied
Note that the HSBC Champions did not become a WGC event until 2009.

== European Tour professional career summary ==
Year	Starts	Cuts Made	Wins	2nd	3rd	Top 10	Top 25	Earnings (€)	Money list rank
1994	1	0	0	0	0	0	0	0	n/a^{1}
1995	1	1	0	0	0	0	0	4,200	n/a^{1}
1996	2	1	0	0	0	0	0	6,944	n/a^{1}
1997	1	1	0	0	0	0	0	8,689	n/a^{1}
1998	22	11	0	0	0	1	5	83,823	104
1999	24	15	0	1	1	2	8	222,783	50
2000	13	5	0	0	0	2	3	68,199	145
2001	17	10	0	0	0	2	4	174,011	108
2002	20	8	0	0	0	1	2	83,347	152
2003	2	1	0	0	0	0	0	1,773	n/a^{1}
2004	5	3	0	0	0	1	1	28,817	n/a^{1}
2005	7	5	0	0	0	1	2	42,845	n/a^{1}
2006	17	11	2	0	0	4	8	1,173,177	16
2007	31	26	0	0	1	1	9	717,790	46
2008	26	20	1	2	0	8	15	1,218,209	12
2009	22	17	0	0	0	3	8	847,844	34
2010	15	10	0	0	0	2	7	393,449	74
2011	30	17	0	0	0	2	8	329,262	94
2012	25	19	1	0	0	2	6	926,062	32
2013	23	6	0	0	0	1	5	156,643	133
Total*	304	190	4	3	2	33	91	6,487,987	62

^{1} Not a full Tour member in these years

- As of 2013 season

== Team appearances ==
Amateur

- Eisenhower Trophy (representing India): 1988, 1992

Professional

- Alfred Dunhill Cup (representing India): 1996, 1999
- Dynasty Cup (representing Asia): 2003 (winners)
- Royal Trophy (representing Asia): 2007, 2010, 2011, 2012 (winners)
- World Cup (representing India): 2008, 2009
- EurAsia Cup (representing Asia): 2016 (non-playing captain)

== See also ==
- List of golfers with most Asian Tour wins
