= Guam Open =

Golf tournament

Tournament information
- Location: Guam
- Established: 1996
- Course: LeoPalace Resort
- Par: 72
- Length: 6,757 yards (6,179 m)
- Tour: Asian Tour
- Format: Stroke play
- Prize fund: US$200,000
- Month played: May
- Final year: 1998

Tournament record score
- Aggregate: 272 Jerry Smith (1998)
- To par: −16 as above

Final champion
- (United States) Jerry Smith

Location map
- Location in Guam

The Guam Open was a golf tournament held in Guam from 1996 to 1998. It was an event on the Asian Tour.

== Winners ==
Year	Winner	Score	To par	Margin of victory	Runner(s)-up	Ref.
Guam Open
1998	(United States) Jerry Smith	272	−16	6 strokes	(India) Arjun Atwal (South Africa) Chris Williams	
DFS Galleria Guam Open
1997	(United States) Gerry Norquist	210 (Note: Shortened to 54 holes due to Typhoon Isa.)	−6	3 strokes	(United States) Mike Cunning	
Guam Open
1996	(South Korea) Mo Joong-kyung	287	−1	3 strokes	(Australia) Don Fardon (United States) Aaron Meeks (Australia) Jeff Wagner	

== See also ==
- Open golf tournament
