= Honda Invitational =

Asian Honda Classic
Tournament information
- Location: Bangkok, Thailand
- Established: 1996
- Course: Thai Country Club
- Par: 72
- Tour: Asian Tour
- Format: Stroke play
- Prize fund: US$300,000
- Month played: February
- Final year: 1997

Tournament record score
- Aggregate: 268 Tiger Woods (1997)
- To par: −20 as above

Final champion
- (United States) Tiger Woods

Location map
- Location in Thailand

The Honda Invitational was a golf tournament on the Asian Tour that was held in Thailand in 1996 and 1997. The tournament was won, respectively, by Steve Elkington and Tiger Woods.

== History ==
The 1997 event received far more media attention due to the presence of Woods, who received a reported $480,000 appearance fee, which was more than the total prize fund of the tournament. However his management company, IMG, expressed that the reason Woods attended the event was because his mother is from Thailand. When he arrived at the airport there were 1,000 people waiting for him and four of the country's five television stations carried his arrival live. After an opening round of 70 (−2) that put him three shots behind, Woods shot 64-66-68 over the last three days to win by ten strokes.

== Winners ==
Year	Winner	Score	To par	Margin of victory	Runner-up	Winner's share ($)	Venue	Ref.
Asian Honda Classic
1997	(United States) Tiger Woods	268	−20	10 strokes	(South Korea) Mo Joong-kyung	48,000	Thai CC	
Honda Invitational
1996	(Australia) Steve Elkington	281	−7	1 stroke	(Philippines) Felix Casas	48,450	Blue Canyon	
