= Vietnam Open (golf) =

Professional golf tournament

Tournament information
- Location: Ho Chi Minh City, Vietnam
- Established: 1995
- Courses: Vietnam Golf & Country Club
- Par: 72
- Tour: Asian Tour
- Format: Stroke play
- Prize fund: US$200,000
- Month played: March
- Final year: 1997

Tournament record score
- Aggregate: 273 Andrew Bonhomme (1997); 273 Clay Devers (1995)
- To par: −15 as above

Final champion
- (Australia) Andrew Bonhomme

Location map
- Location in Vietnam

The Vietnam Open was a professional golf tournament on the Asian Tour played in 1995 and 1997.

The inaugural tournament in 1995, played as the Gadgil Western Vietnam Open, was the first professional golf event in Vietnam.

== Winners ==
| Year | Winner | Score | To par | Margin of victory | Runner-up |
Vietnam Open
| 1997 | (Australia) Andrew Bonhomme | 273 | −15 | 1 stroke | (Taiwan) Chang Tse-peng |
Gadgil Western Vietnam Open
1996: No tournament
| 1995 | (United States) Clay Devers | 273 | −15 | 1 stroke | (Thailand) Boonchu Ruangkit |

== See also ==
- Open golf tournament
- Ho Tram Open
