= Thai Country Club =

Golf course in Thailand

Club information
- Location: Bang Pakong district, Chachoengsao, Thailand
- Established: 1996
- Type: Private
- Total holes: 18
- Tournaments: Asian Honda Classic (1997); Volvo Masters of Asia (2005–2008); Thailand Open (2017–2019); Aramco Team Series (2022)
- Website: thaicountryclub.com

Thai Country Club
- Designed by: Denis Griffiths
- Par: 72
- Length: 7,157 yd (6,544 m)

Thai Country Club (Thai: ไทยคันทรีคลับ) is a private golf club and tournament venue in Bang Pakong district, Chachoengsao province, Thailand. Opened in December 1996, the club's 18-hole course was designed by American golf course architect Denis Griffiths.

The club has hosted several professional golf tournaments, including the 1997 Asian Honda Classic, won by Tiger Woods, the Volvo Masters of Asia, the Thailand Open and the Aramco Team Series.

== History ==
Thai Country Club opened in December 1996. The course was designed by Denis Griffiths to United States Golf Association specifications. The Asian Golf Industry Federation reported that the club gained international exposure in 1997 when it hosted the Asian Honda Classic, won by Tiger Woods.

In February 1997, Thai Country Club hosted the Asian Honda Classic. Woods entered the final round with a six-stroke lead after shooting 66 in the third round on the par-72 course. He won the tournament by ten strokes, finishing at 20-under-par 268.

The club later hosted the Volvo Masters of Asia, the Asian Tour's season-ending event, from 2005 to 2008.

Thai Country Club hosted the Thailand Open after the tournament returned to the Asian Tour schedule in 2017. The 2018 edition won by Panuphol Pittayarat. Tournament records list Thai Country Club as the venue for the 2017, 2018 and 2019 editions.

In 2022, the club hosted the Bangkok event of the Aramco Team Series on the Ladies European Tour.

== Course ==
Thai Country Club is an 18-hole, par-72 course designed by Denis Griffiths. The course is located east of Bangkok, off the Bang Na–Trat Road in Chachoengsao province.

== Tournaments hosted ==
Thai Country Club has hosted several professional golf tournaments, including:

- Asian Honda Classic – The club hosted the 1997 edition, won by Tiger Woods by ten strokes.
- Volvo Masters of Asia – The club hosted the Asian Tour season-ending event from 2005 to 2008.
- Thailand Open – The club hosted the national open from 2017 to 2019.
- Aramco Team Series - Bangkok – The club hosted the 2022 Aramco Team Series event on the Ladies European Tour.

== See also ==
- Golf in Thailand
