= Yeh Chang-ting =

Taiwanese golfer

Personal information
- Nationality: Taiwan
- Born: 5 December 1967 (age 58)
- Height: 1.75 m (5 ft 9 in)
- Weight: 77 kg (170 lb; 12.1 st)

Career
- Sport: Golf
- Turned professional: 1992
- Current tours: Asian Tour; Japan Golf Tour
- Professional wins: 7

Number of wins by tour
- Japan Golf Tour: 1
- Asian Tour: 2
- Other: 4

Yeh Chang-ting (Chinese: 葉彰廷, born 5 December 1967) is a professional golfer from Taiwan.

== Professional career ==
Yeh has played on the Japan Golf Tour for most of his career, where he has one victory in 1997. His first full season on Tour was in 1995. His lone victory came at the 1997 Nikkei Cup Torakichi Nakamura Memorial.

Yeh has also been a member of the Asian Tour in 1996 and 2004 to 2007. He has two wins on the Asian Tour.

== Professional wins (7) ==
=== PGA of Japan Tour wins (1) ===
No.	Date	Tournament	Winning score	Margin of victory	Runner-up
1	27 Jul 1997	Nikkei Cup Torakichi Nakamura Memorial	−16 (67-70-67-68=272)	Playoff	(Japan) Tsukasa Watanabe

PGA of Japan Tour playoff record (1–0)

No.	Year	Tournament	Opponent	Result
1	1997	Nikkei Cup Torakichi Nakamura Memorial	(Japan) Tsukasa Watanabe	Won with par on second extra hole

=== Asian PGA Tour wins (2) ===
No.	Date	Tournament	Winning score	Margin of victory	Runner-up
1	14 Jan 1996 (1995 season)	Omega PGA Championship	−9 (67-68-69-67=271)	5 strokes	(Wales) Mark Mouland
2	5 Oct 1996	Yokohama Singapore PGA Championship	−13 (66-69-71-69=275)	1 stroke	(United States) Fran Quinn

=== Asia Golf Circuit wins (1) ===
No.	Date	Tournament	Winning score	Margin of victory	Runner-up
1	4 Apr 1993	Philippine Open	−7 (69-69-68-75=281)	1 stroke	(Mexico) Carlos Espinosa

=== Other wins (3) ===
- 1993 Republic of China Sun Feng Open, Republic of China Lion Cup
- 1999 Mercuries Taiwan Masters

== Team appearances ==
Amateur

- Eisenhower Trophy (representing Taiwan): 1992

Professional

- Dunhill Cup (representing Taiwan): 1994
