= Volvo Masters of Asia =

Tournament information
- Location: Bangkok, Thailand
- Established: 2002
- Course: Thai Country Club
- Par: 72
- Length: 6,997 yards (6,398 m)
- Tour: Asian Tour
- Format: Stroke play
- Prize fund: US$750,000
- Month played: December
- Final year: 2008

Tournament record score
- Aggregate: 265 Thongchai Jaidee (2003)
- To par: −20 Shiv Kapur (2005)

Final champion
- (Singapore) Lam Chih Bing
- Location in Thailand

The Volvo Masters of Asia was the final event of the season on golf's Asian Tour until 2008.

It was first played in 2002 and the field was originally restricted to the top 60 players on the Asian Tour's Order of Merit, increasing to 65 in the final year.

In 2006 the prize fund went up to US$650,000 and in 2007 and 2008 to US$750,000. Even though it is not close to being the richest tournament on the Asian Tour, the Volvo Masters of Asia was the tour's designated "Premier Event" for Official World Golf Ranking purposes, with a minimum winner's point allocation set at 20, regardless of the strength of the field. The winner also received a Waterford crystal vase.

== Tournament hosts ==
- 2002–2004 Kota Permai Golf and Country Club in Malaysia
- 2003 Bangkok Golf Club in Thailand
- 2005–2008 Thai Country Club in Thailand

== Winners ==
Year	Winner	Score	To par	Margin of victory	Runner(s)-up
2009	Cancelled due to lack of sponsorship				
2008	(Singapore) Lam Chih Bing	274	−14	3 strokes	(Thailand) Chapchai Nirat
2007	(Thailand) Prayad Marksaeng	275	−13	1 stroke	(England) Chris Rodgers
2006	(Thailand) Thongchai Jaidee (2)	277	−11	1 stroke	(Philippines) Frankie Miñoza
2005	(India) Shiv Kapur	268	−20	2 strokes	(India) Jyoti Randhawa
2004	(India) Jyoti Randhawa	274	−14	Playoff	(Australia) Terry Pilkadaris
2003	(Thailand) Thongchai Jaidee	265	−19	1 stroke	(Taiwan) Lin Keng-chi
2002	(United States) Kevin Na	272	−16	2 strokes	(South Africa) Craig Kamps (United States) Anthony Kang (India) Arjun Singh (Scotland) Simon Yates

== See also ==
- Volvo Masters of Malaysia
