= Dynasty Cup (golf) =

Tournament information
- Location: Shenzhen, China
- Established: 2003
- Courses: Mission Hills Golf Club; World Cup course
- Tours: Asian Tour; Japan Golf Tour
- Format: Match play

Final champion
- Asia

The Dynasty Cup was a men's professional team golf competition between teams representing Asia and Japan. It was played twice, in 2003 and 2005 and took place on the World Cup course at the Mission Hills Golf Club in Shenzhen, China. The event was organised by the Asian Tour and Japan Golf Tour. Asia won both events that were contested.

For sponsorship reasons, the 2003 event was called the Phoenix Dynasty Cup presented by VISA, while the 2005 event was called the Visa Dynasty Cup.

== Format ==
The teams consisted of 12 golfers. The tournament was played over three days with 6 foursomes matches on the first day, 6 fourball matches on the second day, and 12 singles matches on the final day. One point was awarded for each win and a half point for a halved match. With a total of 24 points, a team needed to get 12.5 points to win the Cup.

== History ==
The inaugural event was held 14–16 March 2003. The non-playing captains were Hsieh Min-Nan and Isao Aoki. Asia won by a score of 16½ to 7½.

The second event was held 15–17 April 2005. The team captains were the same as in 2003, Hsieh and Aoki. Charlie Wi was on the original Asia team but withdrew and was replaced by Angelo Que. Asia won by a score of 14½ to 9½.

== Results ==
Year	Venue	Winning team	Score	Asia captain	Japan captain
2005	Mission Hills, Shenzhen	Asia	14½–9½	Hsieh Min-Nan	Isao Aoki
2003	Mission Hills, Shenzhen	Asia	16½–7½	Hsieh Min-Nan	Isao Aoki

== Teams ==
=== Asia ===
- 2003: Arjun Atwal, Kang Wook-soon, Lin Keng-chi, Prayad Marksaeng, Jyoti Randhawa, Jeev Milkha Singh, Thammanoon Sriroj, Thaworn Wiratchant, Thongchai Jaidee, Liang Wenchong, Charlie Wi, Zhang Lianwei
- 2005: Boonchu Ruangkit, Amandeep Johl, Mardan Mamat, Mo Joong-kyung, Prayad Marksaeng, Angelo Que, Jyoti Randhawa, Thammanoon Sriroj, Thaworn Wiratchant, Thongchai Jaidee, Liang Wenchong, Zhang Lianwei

=== Japan ===
- 2003: Hiroyuki Fujita, Keiichiro Fukabori, Yasuharu Imano, Tomohiro Kondo, Katsunori Kuwabara, Hajime Meshiai, Katsumasa Miyamoto, Kiyoshi Murota, Tsuneyuki Nakajima, Nobuhito Sato, Toru Suzuki, Taichi Teshima
- 2005: Hiroyuki Fujita, Keiichiro Fukabori, Tetsuji Hiratsuka, Takashi Kamiyama, Hideki Kase, Shingo Katayama, Ryoken Kawagishi, Tomohiro Kondo, Shigeki Maruyama, Katsumasa Miyamoto, Toru Suzuki, Takuya Taniguchi
