= Omega PGA Championship =

Golf tournament

Tournament information
- Location: China
- Established: 1996
- Tour: Asian Tour
- Format: Stroke play
- Final year: 1999

Tournament record score
- Aggregate: 263 Kang Wook-soon (1998)
- To par: −18 Fran Quinn (1999)

Final champion
- (United States) Fran Quinn

The Omega PGA Championship was a professional golf tournament that was held between 1996 and 1999. It was the final stroke play event in each of the first five seasons of the Asian PGA Tour, now known as the Asian Tour, and one of the tours four "majors". It was held twice in 1996, in January and December, to end the 1995 and 1996 seasons.

It was hosted at Clearwater Bay Golf and Country Club in Hong Kong between 1995 and 1998, before moving to Mission Hills Golf Club in Shenzhen, China for 1999.

== Winners ==
Year	Winner	Score	To par	Margin of victory	Runner(s)-up	Venue	Ref.
1999	(United States) Fran Quinn	270	−18	3 strokes	(Scotland) Simon Yates	Mission Hills	
1998	(South Korea) Kang Wook-soon	263	−17	3 strokes	(Taiwan) Hsieh Chin-sheng	Clearwater Bay	
1997	(Philippines) Rodrigo Cuello	270	−10	1 stroke	(Taiwan) Lu Wen-teh	Clearwater Bay	
1996 (Dec)	(United States) Gerry Norquist	268	−12	1 stroke	(Australia) John Senden (Australia) Jeff Wagner	Clearwater Bay	
1996 (Jan)	(Taiwan) Yeh Chang-ting	271	−9	5 strokes	(Wales) Mark Mouland	Clearwater Bay	
