= Charlie Wi =

South Korean golfer

Charlie Wi 위창수
Personal information
- Full name: Wi Chang-soo
- Nationality: South Korea
- Born: 3 January 1972 (age 54) Seoul, South Korea
- Height: 5 ft 10 in (1.78 m)
- Weight: 175 lb (79 kg; 12.5 st)
- Children: 2

Career
- Sport: Golf
- College: University of California, Berkeley
- Turned professional: 1995
- Current tour: PGA Tour Champions
- Former tours: PGA Tour; European Tour; Japan Golf Tour; Asian Tour; Web.com Tour; Korean Tour
- Professional wins: 9
- Highest ranking: 82 (26 April 2009)

Number of wins by tour
- European Tour: 1
- Asian Tour: 7 (Tied-9th all-time)
- Other: 5

Best results in major championships
- Masters Tournament: DNP
- PGA Championship: T9: 2008
- U.S. Open: T29: 2012
- The Open Championship: DNP

Wi Chang-soo (Korean: 위창수; born 3 January 1972), commonly known as Charlie Wi, is a South Korean professional golfer who currently plays on PGA Tour Champions. He previously played on the PGA Tour, European Tour, Asian Tour and the Korean Tour. He was a one-time winner on the European Tour and a seven-time winner on the Asian Tour.

== Early life and amateur career ==
Wi was born in Seoul, and moved to Los Angeles, United States at the age of 10. He attended the University of California, Berkeley, after briefly attending the University of Nevada, Reno and had a successful amateur career.

== Professional career ==
Wi turned professional in 1995. Early in his career, Wi played all over the world, competing on the European, Asian and Japanese tours. He had most success on the Asian Tour where he finished second on the money list in 2001, just behind Thongchai Jaidee, having won three times during the season.

Wi earned his place on the PGA Tour for 2005 when he successfully negotiated all three stages of the 2004 qualifying school. However, he did not do well enough in his rookie season to retain his card, and went back to play on the Asian Tour in 2006, finishing 4th on the money list. He also competed on the second tier Nationwide Tour, before returning to qualifying school where he regained his place on the PGA Tour for 2007.

In February 2006, Wi secured the biggest win of his career, when he won the Maybank Malaysian Open, an event co-sanctioned by the European and Asian tours.

In May 2011, Wi finished runner-up at a PGA Tour event for the fourth time in his career losing to David Toms at the Crowne Plaza Invitational at Colonial. Wi was seven strokes behind Toms at the halfway stage, but shot a 66 during the third round to take a one stroke lead into the final round. Wi held his lead until midway through the final round when Toms holed out from the fairway for an eagle and would eventually go on to lose by one stroke.

Wi finished as runner-up in February 2012 at the AT&T Pebble Beach National Pro-Am after taking a three stroke 54 hole lead into the final round. He shot a final round 72 to finish at 15 under, but lost out by two strokes as Phil Mickelson came from six back to claim the title with an 8 under par round of 64. This marked the fifth occasion on which Wi had recorded a second-place finish on the PGA Tour in his career.

In April 2023, Wi finished second to Mark Hensby in the Invited Celebrity Classic on PGA Tour Champions in Irving, Texas. Wi qualified as an alternate into the tournament but ended up losing on the fourth hole of a sudden death playoff after hitting his ball in the water.

== Swing style ==
Wi's golf swing style fits the model known as stack and tilt, and he helped to choose this name. He is coached since 2005 by Mike Bennett and Andy Plummer, who consider him the best example of their swing model:

Today Charlie is thought of by many players as one of the best ball-strikers on tour, and he exhibits the moves we teach better than any other player. If you want to know what Stack & Tilt should look like, watch Charlie Wi.

Wi does not transfer body weight to the trail leg on back swing but moves the weight forward during the whole swing, even with the driver. He performs a steep shoulder turn around a steady axis.

== Amateur wins ==
- 1990 California State Amateur
- 1995 Southern California Amateur

== Professional wins (9) ==
=== European Tour wins (1) ===
No.	Date	Tournament	Winning score	Margin of victory	Runner-up
1	19 Feb 2006	Maybank Malaysian Open^{1}	−19 (66-68-63=197) (Note: Shortened to 54 holes due to weather.)	1 stroke	(Thailand) Thongchai Jaidee

^{1}Co-sanctioned by the Asian Tour

=== Asian Tour wins (7) ===
No.	Date	Tournament	Winning score	Margin of victory	Runner(s)-up
1	21 Sep 1997	Mild Seven Kuala Lumpur Open	−11 (67-73-69-68=277)	4 strokes	(Taiwan) Lu Wen-teh, (China) Zhang Lianwei
2	20 May 2001	SK Telecom Open^{1}	−7 (69-72-69-71=281)	Playoff	(South Korea) Kang Wook-soon, (Scotland) Simon Yates
3	23 Sep 2001	Shinhan Donghae Open^{1}	−12 (66-70-70-70=276)	1 stroke	(India) Vivek Bhandari, (South Korea) Yang Yong-eun
4	21 Oct 2001	Volvo China Open	−16 (68-67-69-68=272)	1 stroke	(Thailand) Thongchai Jaidee
5	28 Apr 2002	SK Telecom Open^{1} (2)	−16 (67-69-67-69=272)	2 strokes	(Australia) Kim Felton, (United States) Kevin Na
6	26 Sep 2004	Taiwan Open	−4 (76-76-64-68=284)	3 strokes	(Australia) Terry Pilkadaris
7	18 Feb 2006	Maybank Malaysian Open^{2}	−19 (66-68-63=197)	1 stroke	(Thailand) Thongchai Jaidee

^{1}Co-sanctioned by the Korean Tour
^{2}Co-sanctioned by the European Tour

Asian Tour playoff record (1–0)

No.	Year	Tournament	Opponents	Result
1	2001	SK Telecom Open	(South Korea) Kang Wook-soon, (Scotland) Simon Yates	Won with birdie on seventh extra hole Yates eliminated by birdie on fifth hole

=== Korean Tour wins (5) ===
No.	Date	Tournament	Winning score	Margin of victory	Runner(s)-up
1	20 May 2001	SK Telecom Open^{1}	−7 (69-72-69-71=281)	Playoff	(South Korea) Kang Wook-soon, (Scotland) Simon Yates
2	23 Sep 2001	Shinhan Donghae Open^{1}	−12 (66-70-70-70=276)	1 stroke	(India) Vivek Bhandari, (South Korea) Yang Yong-eun
3	28 Apr 2002	SK Telecom Open^{1} (2)	−16 (67-69-67-69=272)	2 strokes	(Australia) Kim Felton, (United States) Kevin Na
4	6 Jun 2004	Pocari Energy Open	−11 (69-70-74-64=277)	3 strokes	(South Korea) Choi Yoon-soo
5	23 Oct 2005	GS Caltex Masters	−11 (67-73-71-66=277)	8 strokes	(South Korea) Choi Gwang-soo

^{1}Co-sanctioned by the Asian PGA Tour

Korean Tour playoff record (1–0)

No.	Year	Tournament	Opponents	Result
1	2001	SK Telecom Open	(South Korea) Kang Wook-soon, (Scotland) Simon Yates	Won with birdie on seventh extra hole Yates eliminated by birdie on fifth hole

== Playoff record ==
PGA Tour Champions playoff record (0–1)

No.	Year	Tournament	Opponent	Result
1	2023	Invited Celebrity Classic	(Australia) Mark Hensby	Lost to par on fourth extra hole

== Results in major championships ==
Tournament	2008	2009	2010	2011	2012
U.S. Open		CUT			T29
The Open Championship					
PGA Championship	T9	T56	CUT	CUT	CUT

Top 10
Did not play

CUT = missed the half way cut
"T" indicates a tie for a place.
Note: Wi never played in the Masters Tournament.

== Results in The Players Championship ==
Tournament	2008	2009	2010	2011	2012	2013	2014
The Players Championship	T63	CUT	CUT	T41	T25	T55	CUT

CUT = missed the halfway cut
"T" indicates a tie for a place

== Results in World Golf Championships ==
Tournament	2002
Match Play	
Championship	
Invitational	T63

Did not play

"T" = Tied

== Team appearances ==
Professional

- Dynasty Cup (representing Asia): 2003 (winners)
- World Cup (representing South Korea): 2006, 2009
- Royal Trophy (representing Asia): 2009 (winners), 2010

== See also ==
- 2004 PGA Tour Qualifying School graduates
- 2006 PGA Tour Qualifying School graduates
- List of golfers with most Asian Tour wins
