= 1995 Asian PGA Tour =

Golf tour season

1995 Asian PGA Tour season
- Duration: 22 June 1995 – 21 January 1996
- Number of official events: 18
- Most wins: (Taiwan) Lin Keng-chi (3)
- Order of Merit: (Taiwan) Lin Keng-chi
- Players' Player of the Year: (Taiwan) Lin Keng-chi
- Rookie of the Year: (India) Arjun Atwal

The 1995 Asian PGA Tour, titled as the 1995 Omega Tour for sponsorship reasons, was the inaugural season of the Asian PGA Tour, one of the main professional golf tours in Asia (outside of Japan) alongside the long established Asia Golf Circuit.

== Omega title sponsorship ==
In September, it was announced that the tour had signed a title sponsorship agreement with Omega SA, being renamed as the Omega Tour. The agreement was reported to be worth US$6,000,000 over three years.

== Schedule ==
The following table lists official events during the 1995 season.

Date	Tournament	Host country	Purse (US$)	Winner (Note: The number in brackets after each winner's name is the number of Asian PGA Tour events they had won up to and including that tournament. This information is only shown for Asian PGA Tour members.)	Notes
25 Jun	Asian PGA International	Thailand	200,000	(South Korea) Park Nam-sin (1)	
2 Jul	Canlubang Classic	Philippines	150,000	(Mexico) Carlos Espinosa (1)	
30 Jul	Tournament Players Championship	Malaysia	150,000	(Taiwan) Lin Keng-chi (1)	
13 Aug	Volvo Masters of Thailand	Thailand	85,000	(China) Zhang Lianwei (1)	
27 Aug	Yokohama Singapore PGA Championship	Singapore	200,000	(Taiwan) Lin Keng-chi (2)	
3 Sep	Passport Open	South Korea	300,000	(Fiji) Vijay Singh (n/a)	
1 Oct	Langkawi Open	Malaysia	150,000	(Thailand) Boonchu Ruangkit (1)	
8 Oct	Gadgil Western Dubai Creek Open	UAE	500,000	(Australia) Robert Willis (1)	
15 Oct	Merlion Masters	Singapore	200,000	(South Africa) Nico van Rensburg (1)	
22 Oct	Samsung Masters	South Korea	500,000	(Taiwan) Lin Keng-chi (3)	
29 Oct	Royal Perak Classic	Malaysia	150,000	(United States) Gerry Norquist (1)	
20 Nov	Kenmore Pakistan Masters	Pakistan	225,000	(South Korea) Kwon Young-suk (1)	
27 Nov	Gadgil Western Masters	India	500,000	(India) Gaurav Ghei (1)	
10 Dec	Gadgil Western Vietnam Open	Vietnam	150,000	(United States) Clay Devers (1)	
17 Dec	Philippine Classic	Philippines	200,000	(India) Jeev Milkha Singh (1)	
7 Jan	Myanmar Open	Myanmar	150,000	(Thailand) Boonchu Ruangkit (2)	
14 Jan	Omega PGA Championship	Hong Kong	500,000	(Taiwan) Yeh Chang-ting (1)	
21 Jan	Asian Matchplay Championship	Philippines	200,000	(India) Jeev Milkha Singh (2)	Limited-field event

== Order of Merit ==
The Order of Merit was based on prize money won during the season, calculated in U.S. dollars.

Position	Player	Prize money ($)
1	(Taiwan) Lin Keng-chi	177,856
2	(Thailand) Boonchu Ruangkit	173,378
3	(India) Jeev Milkha Singh	154,403
4	(Australia) Robert Willis	132,642
5	(India) Gaurav Ghei	124,934

== Awards ==
Award	Winner	Ref.
Players' Player of the Year	(Taiwan) Lin Keng-chi	
Rookie of the Year	(India) Arjun Atwal	

== See also ==
- 1995 Asia Golf Circuit
