= List of golfers with most Asian Tour wins =

This is a list of golfers who have won five or more events on the Asian Tour, which was founded in 1995.

Many of the players on the list have won events on other tours and unofficial events or won tournaments that have been Asian Tour events but were not part of the Asian Tour schedule at the time.

This list is up to date as of 25 October 2026.

Rank	Player	Lifespan	Wins	Winning span
1	(Thailand) Thaworn Wiratchant	1966–	18	1996–2014
2	(Thailand) Thongchai Jaidee	1969–	13	2000–2010
3	(India) Gaganjeet Bhullar	1988–	11	2009–2023
T4	(Australia) Scott Hend	1973–	10	2008–2019
T4	(Thailand) Prayad Marksaeng	1966–	10	1996–2017
T6	(India) Arjun Atwal	1973–	8	1999–2014
T6	(India) Jyoti Randhawa	1972–	8	1998–2009
T6	(England) Lee Westwood (Note: Jiménez, García and Westwood are not Asian Tour members. All of Jiménez's wins came in events co-sanctioned by the European Tour.)	1973–	8	1998–2015
T9	(United States) John Catlin	1990–	7	2018–2026
T9	(Thailand) Jazz Janewattananond	1995–	7	2017–2022
T9	(Spain) Miguel Ángel Jiménez	1964–	7	2004–2013
T9	(South Korea) Kang Wook-soon	1966–	7	1996–2001
T9	(India) Anirban Lahiri	1987–	7	2011–2015
T9	(South Korea) Charlie Wi	1972–	7	1996–2006
T15	(India) Shiv Chawrasia	1978–	6	2008–2017
T15	(South Korea) K. J. Choi (Note: Choi is an honorary member of the Asian Tour.)	1970–	6	1999–2012
T15	(Taiwan) Lin Wen-tang	1974–	6	2006–2013
T15	(India) Jeev Milkha Singh	1971–	6	1995–2008
T15	(China) Zhang Lianwei	1965–	6	1995–2003
T19	(Taiwan) Chan Shih-chang	1986–	5	2016–2022
T19	(Spain) Sergio García	1980–	5	2002–2018
T19	(South Africa) Retief Goosen	1969–	5	2002–2008
T19	(Taiwan) Lin Keng-chi	1966–	5	1995–2003
T19	(Taiwan) Lu Wen-teh	1963–	5	1998–2008
T19	(Singapore) Mardan Mamat	1967–	5	2004–2015
T19	(United States) Gerry Norquist	1962–	5	1995–1999
T19	(Australia) Wade Ormsby	1980–	5	2013–2025
T19	(Thailand) Boonchu Ruangkit	1956–	5	1995–2004
T19	(Fiji) Vijay Singh	1963–	5	1995–2007
T19	(Thailand) Thammanoon Sriroj	1969–	5	1996–2004
