= 2001 Asian PGA Tour =

Golf tour season

2001 Asian PGA Tour season
- Duration: 1 February 2001 – 2 December 2001
- Number of official events: 17
- Most wins: (South Korea) Charlie Wi (3)
- Order of Merit: (Thailand) Thongchai Jaidee
- Players' Player of the Year: (Thailand) Thongchai Jaidee
- Rookie of the Year: (South Korea) Ted Oh

The 2001 Asian PGA Tour, titled as the 2001 Davidoff Tour for sponsorship reasons, was the seventh season of the Asian PGA Tour, the main professional golf tour in Asia (outside of Japan) since it was established in 1995.

It was the third season of the tour under a title sponsorship agreement with Davidoff, that was announced in May 1999.

== Schedule ==
The following table lists official events during the 2001 season.

Date	Tournament	Host country	Purse (US$)	Winner (Note: The number in brackets after each winner's name is the number of Asian PGA Tour events they had won up to and including that tournament. This information is only shown for Asian PGA Tour members.)	OWGR points	Other tours (Note: EUR − European Tour; KOR − Korean Tour.)	Notes
4 Feb	Thailand Masters	Thailand	200,000	(South Korea) Kang Wook-soon (7)	6		New tournament
11 Feb	London Myanmar Open	Myanmar	200,000	(United States) Anthony Kang (2)	6		
18 Feb	Carlsberg Malaysian Open	Malaysia	910,000	(Fiji) Vijay Singh (n/a)	18	EUR	
25 Feb	Caltex Singapore Masters	Singapore	850,000	(Fiji) Vijay Singh (n/a)	24	EUR	New tournament
18 Mar	Wills Indian Open	India	300,000	(Thailand) Thongchai Jaidee (2)	6		
29 Apr	Maekyung LG Fashion Open	South Korea	₩400,000,000	(South Korea) Choi Gwang-soo (2)	6	KOR	
6 May	Macau Open	Macau	250,000	(China) Zhang Lianwei (3)	12		
20 May	SK Telecom Open	South Korea	300,000	(South Korea) Charlie Wi (2)	6	KOR	New to Asian PGA Tour
24 Jun	Alcatel Singapore Open	Singapore	300,000	(Thailand) Thaworn Wiratchant (2)	6		
12 Aug	Volvo Masters of Malaysia	Malaysia	275,000	(Thailand) Thaworn Wiratchant (3)	6		
2 Sep	Acer Taiwan Open	Taiwan	300,000	(United States) Andrew Pitts (1)	6		
9 Sep	Mercuries Taiwan Masters	Taiwan	300,000	(Sweden) Daniel Chopra (1)	6		
16 Sep	Kolon Cup Korea Open	South Korea	₩400,000,000	(South Korea) Kim Dae-sub (a) (2)	6	KOR	
23 Sep	Shinhan Donghae Open	South Korea	₩400,000,000	(South Korea) Charlie Wi (3)	6	KOR	New to Asian PGA Tour
21 Oct	Volvo China Open	China	400,000	(South Korea) Charlie Wi (4)	6		
25 Nov	BMW Asian Open	Taiwan	1,500,000	(Sweden) Jarmo Sandelin (n/a)	20	EUR	New tournament
2 Dec	Omega Hong Kong Open	Hong Kong	700,000	(Spain) José María Olazábal (n/a)	16	EUR	

== Order of Merit ==
The Order of Merit was based on prize money won during the season, calculated in U.S. dollars.

Position	Player	Prize money ($)
1	(Thailand) Thongchai Jaidee	353,061
2	(South Korea) Charlie Wi	315,857
3	(United States) Andrew Pitts	144,394
4	(Thailand) Thaworn Wiratchant	120,573
5	(India) Arjun Atwal	111,238

== Awards ==
Award	Winner	Ref.
Players' Player of the Year	(Thailand) Thongchai Jaidee	
Rookie of the Year	(South Korea) Ted Oh	
