= 2018 LPGA of Korea Tour =

The 2018 LPGA of Korea Tour was the 41st season of the LPGA of Korea Tour, the professional golf tour for women operated by the Korea Ladies Professional Golf' Association.

== Schedule ==
The number in parentheses after winners' names show the player's total number wins in official money individual events on the LPGA of Korea Tour, including that event.

Dates	Tournament	Host city	Prize fund (KRW)	Winner	WWGR pts	Notes
Dec 8–10	Hyosung Championship	(Vietnam) Binh Duong	700,000,000	(South Korea) Choi Hye-jin (3)	17.5	New tournament
Mar 9–11	Korea Investment & Securities Championship	(Vietnam) Binh Duong	700,000,000	(South Korea) Jang Ha-na (9)	19	New tournament, unofficial in 2016
Mar 17–19	Brunei Ladies Open	(Brunei) Jerudong	700,000,000	(South Korea) Hong Ran (4)	16.5	New tournament Co-sanctioned by China LPGA Tour
Apr 5–8	Lotte Rent-a-Car Women's Open	(South Korea) Seogwipo	600,000,000	(South Korea) Kim Ji-hyun1 (4)	19	Shortened to 36 holes due to weather
Apr 20–22	Nexen-Saintnine Masters	(South Korea) Gimhae	500,000,000	(South Korea) Lee So-young (2)	18	
Apr 26–29	**CreaS F&C KLPGA Championship**	(South Korea) Yangju	1,000,000,000	(South Korea) **Jang Ha-na** (10)	19	
May 4–6	KyoChon Honey Ladies Open	(South Korea) Chuncheon	500,000,000	(South Korea) Kim Hae-rym (6)	18	
May 11–13	NH Investment & Securities Ladies Championship	(South Korea) Yongin	700,000,000	(South Korea) In Ju-yeon (1)	19.5	
May 16–20	Doosan Match Play Championship	(South Korea) Chuncheon	700,000,000	(South Korea) Inbee Park (1)	20.5	
May 25–27	E1 Charity Open	(South Korea) Icheon	800,000,000	(South Korea) Lee Da-yeon (2)	19	
Jun 1–3	Lotte Cantata Ladies Open	(South Korea) Seogwipo	600,000,000	(South Korea) Cho Jeong-min (3)	15.5	
Jun 8–10	S-Oil Championship	(South Korea) Jeju	700,000,000	(South Korea) Lee Seung-hyun (7)	18.5	
Jun 14–17	**Kia Motors Korea Women's Open Championship**	(South Korea) Incheon	1,000,000,000	(South Korea) **Oh Ji-hyun** (5)	20.5	
Jun 21–24	BC Card-Hankyung Ladies Cup	(South Korea) Ansan	700,000,000	(South Korea) Choi Hye-jin (4)	19	
Jun 29 – Jul 1	McCol-Yongpyong Resort Open	(South Korea) Pyeongchang	600,000,000	(South Korea) Park Chae-yoon (1)	18	
Jul 6–8	Asiana Airlines Open	(China) Weihai	700,000,000	(South Korea) Kim Ji-hyun2 (4)	19	Co-sanctioned by China LPGA Tour
Jul 20–22	MY Munyoung Queens Park Championship	(South Korea) Yeoju	600,000,000	(South Korea) Lee So-young (3)	19	
Aug 10–12	Jeju Samdasoo Masters	(South Korea) Jeju	600,000,000	(South Korea) Oh Ji-hyun (6)	19.5	
Aug 17–19	Bogner-MBN Ladies Open	(South Korea) Yangpyeong	600,000,000	(South Korea) Kim Bo-ah (1)	19.5	
Aug 23–26	High1 Resort Ladies Open	(South Korea) Jeongseon	800,000,000	(South Korea) Bae Seon-woo (3)	19	Shortened to 54 holes due to weather
Aug 30 – Sep 2	**Hanwha Classic**	(South Korea) Chuncheon	1,400,000,000	(South Korea) **Lee Jeong-eun** (5)	22	
Sep 7–9	KG-Edaily Ladies Open	(South Korea) Yongin	500,000,000	(South Korea) Jeong Seul-gi (1)	16.5	
Sep 14–16	All For You Championship	(South Korea) Icheon	800,000,000	(South Korea) Lee So-young (4)	19	
Sep 21–23	OK! Savings Bank Pak Se-ri Invitational	(South Korea) Yongin	800,000,000	(South Korea) Kim A-lim (1)	20.5	
Oct 4–7	**Hite Jinro Championship**	(South Korea) Yeoju	800,000,000	(South Korea) **Bae Seon-woo** (4)	20.5	Shortened to 54 holes due to weather
Oct 11–14	LPGA KEB Hana Bank Championship	(South Korea) Incheon	US$2,000,000	(South Korea) Chun In-gee (10)	62	Co-sanctioned by LPGA Tour
Oct 18–21	**KB Financial Star Championship**	(South Korea) Icheon	1,000,000,000	(South Korea) **Lee Jeong-eun** (6)	20.5	
Oct 26–28	SK Networks-Seoul Economic Ladies Classic	(South Korea) Seogwipo	800,000,000	(South Korea) Park Gyeol (1)	19	
Nov 9–11	ADT CAPS Championship	(South Korea) Yeoju	600,000,000	(South Korea) Park Min-ji (2)	19	
Nov 17–18	LF Point Final Championship	(South Korea) Jangheung	200,000,000	(South Korea) Lee Da-yeon	n/a	Unofficial tournament
Nov 23–25	Orange Life Champions Trophy Park In-bee Invitational	(South Korea) Gyeongju	1,000,000,000	LPGA Tour	n/a	Team match play, KLPGA vs LPGA Tour Korean players

Events in bold are majors.
