= 1999 Asian PGA Tour =

Golf tour season

1999 Asian PGA Tour season
- Duration: 28 January 1999 – 12 December 1999
- Number of official events: 19
- Most wins: (United States) Fran Quinn (2)
- Order of Merit: (Myanmar) Kyi Hla Han
- Players' Player of the Year: (Myanmar) Kyi Hla Han
- Rookie of the Year: (Australia) Kenny Druce

The 1999 Asian PGA Tour, titled as the 1999 Davidoff Tour for sponsorship reasons, was the fifth season of the Asian PGA Tour, the main professional golf tour in Asia (outside of Japan) since it was established in 1995.

== Davidoff title sponsorship ==
In May, it was announced that the tour had signed a title sponsorship agreement with Davidoff, being renamed as the Davidoff Tour. The agreement was reported to be worth US$6,000,000 over three years.

== Schedule ==
The following table lists official events during the 1999 season.

Date	Tournament	Host country	Purse (US$)	Winner (Note: The number in brackets after each winner's name is the number of Asian PGA Tour events they had won up to and including that tournament. This information is only shown for Asian PGA Tour members.)	OWGR points	Other tours (Note: ANZ − PGA Tour of Australasia; EUR − European Tour; KOR − Korean Tour.)	Notes
31 Jan	London Myanmar Open	Myanmar	200,000	(Taiwan) Wang Ter-chang (2)	n/a		
7 Feb	Benson & Hedges Malaysian Open	Malaysia	750,000	(United States) Gerry Norquist (5)	24	EUR	New to Asian PGA Tour
14 Mar	Wills Indian Open	India	300,000	(India) Arjun Atwal (1)	n/a		
18 Apr	Macau Open	Macau	200,000	(England) Lee Westwood (n/a)	n/a		
2 May	Maekyung Daks Open	South Korea	250,000	(South Africa) James Kingston (2)	n/a	KOR	New to Asian PGA Tour
23 May	Volvo China Open	China	400,000	(Myanmar) Kyi Hla Han (1)	n/a		
30 May	Casino Filipino Philippine Open	Philippines	200,000	(United States) Anthony Kang (1)	n/a		New to Asian PGA Tour
22 Aug	Tianjin TEDA Open	China	200,000	(Thailand) Thammanoon Sriroj (4)	n/a		New tournament
29 Aug	Volvo Masters of Malaysia	Malaysia	200,000	(South Africa) Nico van Rensburg (3)	n/a		
5 Sep	ERA Taiwan Open	Taiwan	300,000	(South Korea) Kang Wook-soon (5)	n/a		New to Asian PGA Tour
19 Sep	Kolon Korea Open	South Korea	₩350,000,000	(South Korea) K. J. Choi (1)	n/a	KOR	
17 Oct	Lexus International	Thailand	220,000	(India) Jeev Milkha Singh (4)	n/a		
24 Oct	Nokia Singapore Open	Singapore	400,000	(Australia) Kenny Druce (1)	n/a		
31 Oct	Hero Honda Masters	India	200,000	(India) Jyoti Randhawa (2)	n/a		
7 Nov	Sabah Masters	Malaysia	150,000	(United States) Robert Huxtable (2)	n/a		
14 Nov	Johnnie Walker Classic	Taiwan	£800,000	(New Zealand) Michael Campbell (n/a)	28	ANZ, EUR	New to Asian PGA Tour
28 Nov	Perrier Hong Kong Open	Hong Kong	300,000	(Sweden) Patrik Sjöland (n/a)	n/a		
4 Dec	Mittweida Thailand Open	Thailand	200,000	(United States) Fran Quinn (1)	n/a		
12 Dec	Omega PGA Championship	China	500,000	(United States) Fran Quinn (2)	n/a		

== Order of Merit ==
The Order of Merit was based on prize money won during the season, calculated in U.S. dollars.

Position	Player	Prize money ($)
1	(Myanmar) Kyi Hla Han	204,211
2	(United States) Gerry Norquist	139,416
3	(Scotland) Simon Yates	133,000
4	(South Korea) Kang Wook-soon	113,077
5	(South Africa) James Kingston	101,776

== Awards ==
Award	Winner	Ref.
Players' Player of the Year	(Myanmar) Kyi Hla Han	
Rookie of the Year	(Australia) Kenny Druce	
