= Lin Keng-chi =

Taiwanese golfer (born 1966)

Lin Keng-chi 林根基
Personal information
- Nickname: The Pin
- Nationality: Taiwan
- Born: 1 July 1966 (age 60)
- Height: 1.75 m (5 ft 9 in)
- Weight: 82 kg (181 lb; 12.9 st)

Career
- Sport: Golf
- Turned professional: 1989
- Current tours: Asian Tour; Japan Golf Tour
- Professional wins: 9
- Highest ranking: 81 (30 December 2001)

Number of wins by tour
- Japan Golf Tour: 3
- Asian Tour: 5
- Other: 1

Achievements and awards
- Asian PGA Tour Order of Merit winner: 1995
- Asian PGA Tour Players' Player of the Year: 1995

Lin Keng-chi (Chinese: 林根基, born 1 July 1966) is a Taiwanese professional golfer.

== Career ==
Lin has won five tournaments on the Asian Tour and topped the Tour's money list in 1995. He has also played extensively on the Japan Golf Tour, where he had won three titles. In 2001 he reached the top 100 of the Official World Golf Rankings. He was a member of Asia's winning 2003 Dynasty Cup team.

== Professional wins (9) ==
=== Japan Golf Tour wins (3) ===
No.	Date	Tournament	Winning score	Margin of victory	Runner(s)-up
1	15 Jul 2001	Aiful Cup	−18 (68-67-67-68=270)	Playoff	(Japan) Toru Suzuki
2	16 Sep 2001	ANA Open	−15 (66-70-66-71=273)	2 strokes	(Japan) Kazuhiro Kinjo, (Japan) Tsuneyuki Nakajima
3	24 Jul 2005	Sega Sammy Cup	−13 (69-69-69-68=275)	1 stroke	(Japan) Kiyoshi Maita

Japan Golf Tour playoff record (1–0)

No.	Year	Tournament	Opponent	Result
1	2001	Aiful Cup	(Japan) Toru Suzuki	Won with birdie on second extra hole

=== Asian PGA Tour wins (5) ===
No.	Date	Tournament	Winning score	Margin of victory	Runner(s)-up
1	30 Jul 1995	Tournament Players Championship	−10 (72-70-68-68=278)	3 strokes	(South Africa) Craig Kamps, (Taiwan) Lu Wen-teh
2	27 Aug 1995	Yokohama Singapore PGA Championship	−13 (71-68-67-69=275)	1 stroke	(Myanmar) Zaw Moe
3	22 Oct 1995	Samsung Masters	−9 (68-67-74-70=279)	2 strokes	(South Korea) Kim Jong-duck
4	3 Sep 2000	Mercuries Taiwan Masters	−5 (69-72-73-69=283)	2 strokes	(United States) Gerry Norquist
5	2 Mar 2003	Myanmar Open	−13 (67-69-70-69=275)	3 strokes	(Thailand) Thongchai Jaidee

=== Other wins (1) ===
- 1998 Trans Strait Invitational

== Team appearances ==
Amateur

- Eisenhower Trophy (representing Taiwan): 1988

Professional

- Dynasty Cup (representing Asia): 2013 (winners)

== See also ==
- List of golfers with most Asian Tour wins
