= 1997 Dunhill Cup =

Coordinates: 56.351484°N 2.816147°W

Tournament information
- Dates: 16–19 October
- Location: St Andrews, Scotland
- Course: Old Course at St Andrews
- Format: Match play

Statistics
- Par: 72
- Length: 7,094 yards (6,487 m)
- Field: 16 teams of 3 players
- Prize fund: £1,000,000
- Winner's share: £300,000

Champion
- South Africa (Ernie Els, David Frost, Retief Goosen)

The 1997 Dunhill Cup was the 13th Dunhill Cup. It was a team tournament featuring 16 countries, each represented by three players. The Cup was played 16–19 October at the Old Course at St Andrews in Scotland. The sponsor was the Alfred Dunhill company. The South African team of Ernie Els, David Frost, and Retief Goosen beat the Swedish team of Joakim Haeggman, Per-Ulrik Johansson, and Jesper Parnevik in the final.

== Format ==
The Cup was a match play event played over four days. The teams were divided into four four-team groups. The top eight teams were seeded with the remaining teams randomly placed in the bracket. After three rounds of round-robin play, the top team in each group advanced to a single elimination playoff.

In each team match, the three players were paired with their opponents and played 18 holes at medal match play. Matches tied at the end of 18 holes were extended to a sudden-death playoff. The tie-breaker for ties within a group was based on match record, then head-to-head.

== Group play ==
=== Round one ===
Group 1

United States – 2		Argentina – 1	
Player	Score	Player	Score
Mark O'Meara	67	Eduardo Romero	67
Brad Faxon	72	Ángel Cabrera	68
Justin Leonard	65	José Cóceres	72

O'Meara won on the first playoff hole.

England – 3		Japan – 0	
Player	Score	Player	Score
Russell Claydon	70	Tsukasa Watanabe	71
Lee Westwood	70	Nobuhito Sato	73
Mark James	73	Shigemasa Higaki	74

Group 2

Sweden – 3		Taiwan – 0	
Player	Score	Player	Score
Joakim Haeggman	72	Hseih Yu-Shu	72
Jesper Parnevik	65	Lu Hsi-chuen	75
Per-Ulrik Johansson	71	Chen Liang-hsi	75

Haeggman won on the first playoff hole.

Australia – 1		France – 2	
Player	Score	Player	Score
Robert Allenby	71	Fabrice Tamaud	70
Steve Elkington	71	Jean van de Velde	71
Stuart Appleby	68	Marc Farry	71

van de Velde won on the first playoff hole.

Group 3

South Africa – 2		Ireland – 1	
Player	Score	Player	Score
Retief Goosen	70	Paul McGinley	71
David Frost	69	Pádraig Harrington	67
Ernie Els	66	Darren Clarke	71

Scotland – 2		Germany – 1	
Player	Score	Player	Score
Raymond Russell	68	Thomas Gögele	74
Gordon Brand Jnr	69	Alex Čejka	66
Colin Montgomerie	67	Sven Strüver	73

Group 4

Zimbabwe – 2		South Korea – 1	
Player	Score	Player	Score
Nick Price	72	Kim Jong-duck	74
Mark McNulty	69	Mo Joong-kyung	76
Tony Johnstone	73	Kang Wook-soon	73

Kang won on the first playoff hole.

New Zealand – 2		Spain – 1	
Player	Score	Player	Score
Steven Alker	70	Miguel Ángel Martín	73
Frank Nobilo	70	Ignacio Garrido	75
Michael Long	72	Miguel Ángel Jiménez	71

=== Round two ===
Group 1

United States – 3		Japan – 0	
Player	Score	Player	Score
Mark O'Meara	70	Tsukasa Watanabe	72
Justin Leonard	74	Nobuhito Sato	82
Brad Faxon	73	Shigemasa Higaki	79

England – 1		Argentina – 2	
Player	Score	Player	Score
Russell Claydon	74	José Cóceres	71
Mark James	71	Eduardo Romero	72
Lee Westwood	72	Ángel Cabrera	71

Group 2

Sweden – 3		France – 0	
Player	Score	Player	Score
Joakim Haeggman	70	Fabrice Tamaud	78
Jesper Parnevik	73	Marc Farry	74
Per-Ulrik Johansson	72	Jean van de Velde	73

Australia – 2		Taiwan – 1	
Player	Score	Player	Score
Robert Allenby	74	Hseih Yu-Shu	73
Steve Elkington	76	Chen Liang-hsi	76
Stuart Appleby	77	Lu Hsi-chuen	80

Elkington won on the second playoff hole.

Group 3

Ireland – 1		Scotland – 2	
Player	Score	Player	Score
Paul McGinley	69	Raymond Russell	74
Darren Clarke	77	Gordon Brand Jnr	73
Pádraig Harrington	76	Colin Montgomerie	72

South Africa – 3		Germany – 0	
Player	Score	Player	Score
Retief Goosen	73	Thomas Gögele	73
David Frost	74	Alex Čejka	79
Ernie Els	71	Sven Strüver	72

Goosen won on the second playoff hole.

Group 4

New Zealand – 3		South Korea – 0	
Player	Score	Player	Score
Steven Alker	76	Mo Joong-kyung	83
Michael Long	75	Kim Jong-duck	76
Frank Nobilo	68	Kang Wook-soon	70

Spain – 1		Zimbabwe – 2	
Player	Score	Player	Score
Miguel Ángel Martín	74	Tony Johnstone	70
Ignacio Garrido	74	Mark McNulty	70
Miguel Ángel Jiménez		Nick Price	WD

=== Round three ===
Group 1

United States – 3		England – 0	
Player	Score	Player	Score
Mark O'Meara	67	Lee Westwood	69
Brad Faxon	70	Russell Claydon	73
Justin Leonard	69	Mark James	72

Japan – 0.5		Argentina – 2.5	
Player	Score	Player	Score
Shigemasa Higaki	73	Eduardo Romero	71
Tsukasa Watanabe	73	Ángel Cabrera	69
Nobuhito Sato	70	José Cóceres	70

Group 2

Australia – 1		Sweden – 2	
Player	Score	Player	Score
Steve Elkington	72	Per-Ulrik Johansson	72
Stuart Appleby	69	Joakim Haeggman	66
Robert Allenby	68	Jesper Parnevik	70

Johannsson won on the second playoff hole.

France – 3		Taiwan – 0	
Player	Score	Player	Score
Marc Farry	70	Chen Liang-hsi	73
Fabrice Tamaud	71	Lu Hsi-chuen	75
Jean van de Velde	67	Hseih Yu-Shu	76

Group 3

South Africa – 2.5		Scotland – 0.5	
Player	Score	Player	Score
David Frost	68	Raymond Russell	71
Retief Goosen	67	Gordon Brand Jnr	67
Ernie Els	68	Colin Montgomerie	68

Goosen won on the first playoff hole.

Ireland – 2		Germany – 1	
Player	Score	Player	Score
Darren Clarke	68	Alex Čejka	74
Pádraig Harrington	66	Sven Strüver	69
Paul McGinley	71	Thomas Gögele	67

Group 4

New Zealand – 3		Zimbabwe – 0	
Player	Score	Player	Score
Frank Nobilo		Nick Price	WD
Steven Alker	70	Tony Johnstone	75
Michael Long	67	Mark McNulty	68

Spain – 2		South Korea – 1	
Player	Score	Player	Score
Miguel Ángel Martín	78	Kim Jong-duck	70
Miguel Ángel Jiménez	74	Kang Wook-soon	74
Ignacio Garrido	70	Mo Joong-kyung	76

Jiménez won on the second playoff hole.

=== Standings ===
Group 1
Country	W	L	MW	ML
United States	3	0	8	1
Argentina	2	1	5.5	3.5
England	1	2	4	5
Japan	0	3	0.5	8.5

Group 2
Country	W	L	MW	ML
Sweden	3	0	8	1
France	2	1	5	4
Australia	1	2	4	5
Taiwan	0	3	1	8

Group 3
Country	W	L	MW	ML
South Africa	3	0	7.5	1.5
Scotland	2	1	4.5	4.5
Ireland	1	2	4	5
Germany	0	3	2	7

Group 4
Country	W	L	MW	ML
New Zealand	3	0	8	1
Zimbabwe	2	1	4	5
Spain	1	2	4	5
South Korea	0	3	2	7

== Playoffs ==
=== Bracket ===
Semi-finals
1	United States	1
6	Sweden	2
2	South Africa	2
4	New Zealand	1

Final
6	Sweden	1
2	South Africa	2

=== Semi-finals ===
United States – 1		Sweden – 2	
Player	Score	Player	Score
Mark O'Meara	68	Jesper Parnevik	69
Justin Leonard	72	Joakim Haeggman	68
Brad Faxon	74	Per-Ulrik Johansson	71

South Africa – 2		New Zealand – 1	
Player	Score	Player	Score
Retief Goosen	67	Michael Long	72
David Frost	72	Steven Alker	76
Ernie Els	70	Frank Nobilo	66

=== Final ===
South Africa – 2		Sweden – 1	
Player	Score	Player	Score
Retief Goosen	70	Jesper Parnevik	74
David Frost	74	Per-Ulrik Johansson	71
Ernie Els	69	Joakim Haeggman	72

== Team results ==
Country	Place	W	L	MW	ML	Seed
South Africa	1	5	0	11.5	3.5	2
Sweden	2	4	1	11	4	6
New Zealand	T3	3	1	9	3	4
United States	T3	3	1	9	3	1
Argentina	T5	2	1	5.5	3.5	
France	T5	2	1	5	4	
Scotland	T5	2	1	4.5	4.5	
Zimbabwe	T5	2	1	4	5	
Australia	T9	1	2	4	5	3
England	T9	1	2	4	5	8
Ireland	T9	1	2	4	5	7
Spain	T9	1	2	4	5	5
Germany	T13	0	3	2	7	
South Korea	T13	0	3	2	7	
Taiwan	T13	0	3	1	8	
Japan	T13	0	3	0.5	8.5	

== Player results ==
Country	Player	W	L
South Africa	Retief Goosen	5	0
South Africa	Ernie Els	3.5	1.5
South Africa	David Frost	3	2
Sweden	Per-Ulrik Johansson	5	0
Sweden	Joakim Haeggman	4	1
Sweden	Jesper Parnevik	2	3
New Zealand	Frank Nobilo	4	0
New Zealand	Steven Alker	3	1
New Zealand	Michael Long	2	2
United States	Mark O'Meara	4	0
United States	Justin Leonard	3	1
United States	Brad Faxon	2	2
Argentina	Ángel Cabrera	3	0
Argentina	José Cóceres	1.5	1.5
Argentina	Eduardo Romero	1	2
France	Fabrice Tamaud	2	1
France	Jean van de Velde	2	1
France	Marc Farry	1	2
Scotland	Colin Montgomerie	2.5	0.5
Scotland	Gordon Brand Jnr	1	2
Scotland	Raymond Russell	1	2
Zimbabwe	Mark McNulty	2	1
Zimbabwe	Tony Johnstone	1	2
Zimbabwe	Nick Price	1	2
Australia	Stuart Appleby	2	1
Australia	Robert Allenby	1	2
Australia	Steve Elkington	1	2
England	Mark James	2	1
England	Russell Claydon	1	2
England	Lee Westwood	1	2
Ireland	Pádraig Harrington	2	1
Ireland	Darren Clarke	1	2
Ireland	Paul McGinley	1	2
Spain	Miguel Ángel Jiménez	3	0
Spain	Ignacio Garrido	1	2
Spain	Miguel Ángel Martín	0	3
Germany	Alex Čejka	1	2
Germany	Thomas Gögele	1	2
Germany	Sven Strüver	0	3
South Korea	Kang Wook-soon	1	2
South Korea	Kim Jong-duck	1	2
South Korea	Mo Joong-kyung	0	3
Taiwan	Hseih Yu-Shu	1	2
Taiwan	Chen Liang-hsi	0	3
Taiwan	Lu Hsi-chuen	0	3
Japan	Nobuhito Sato	0.5	2.5
Japan	Shigemasa Higaki	0	3
Japan	Tsukasa Watanabe	0	3
