= Gerry Norquist =

American golfer (born 1962)

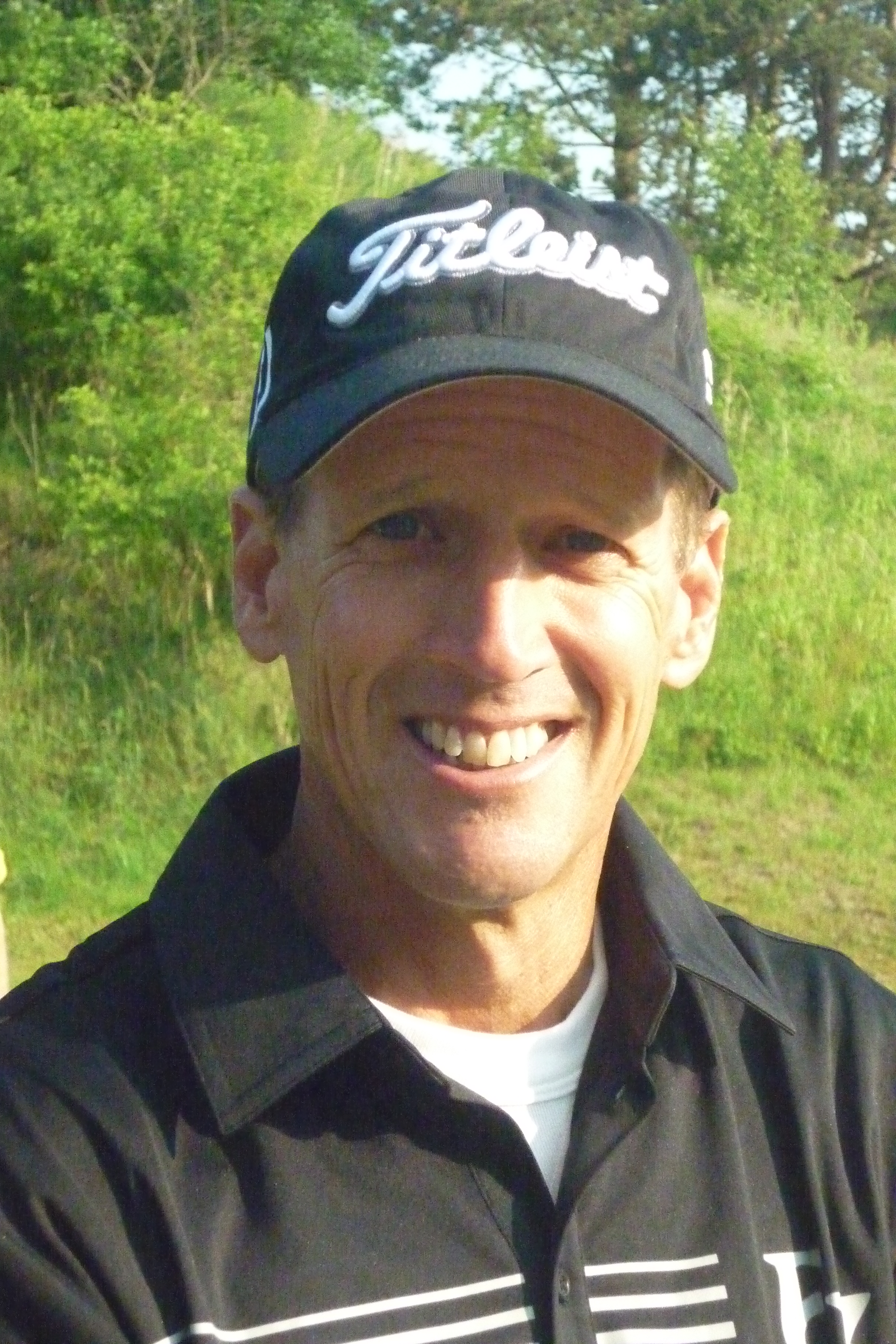
- Norquist at the 2012 Van Lanschot Senior Open

Personal information
- Nationality: United States
- Born: May 29, 1962 (age 64) Portland, Oregon, U.S.
- Height: 5 ft 6 in (1.68 m)
- Weight: 130 lb (59 kg; 9.3 st)

Career
- Sport: Golf
- Turned professional: 1988
- Current tour: European Senior Tour
- Former tours: European Tour; Japan Golf Tour; Asian Tour; Asia Golf Circuit; Nike Tour
- Professional wins: 13

Number of wins by tour
- European Tour: 1
- Asian Tour: 5
- Other: 8

Achievements and awards
- Asia Golf Circuit Rookie of the Year: 1991

Gerry Norquist (born May 29, 1962) is an American professional golfer.

== Career ==
Norquist was born in Portland, Oregon.

Norquist turned professional relatively late at the age of 26. He played most of his tournament golf in Asia, predominantly on the Asian Tour where he won five titles, and later on the Japan Golf Tour. His five wins on the Asian Tour are the most for an American. His biggest win came in 1999 at the European Tour co-sanctioned Benson and Hedges Malaysian Open, which gave him a two-year exemption on that tour.

Norquist maintained his links with the Asian Tour and was appointed senior vice president in 2006.

He was active on the European Seniors Tour in 2012; playing in 14 events, making the cut 12 times. His best finish was a tie for 6th at the Taiwan-based Fubon Senior Open.

== Professional wins (13) ==
=== European Tour wins (1) ===
No.	Date	Tournament	Winning score	Margin of victory	Runners-up
1	Feb 7, 1999	Benson & Hedges Malaysian Open^{1}	−8 (67-67-75-71=280)	3 strokes	(Germany) Alex Čejka, (United States) Bob May

^{1}Co-sanctioned by the Asian PGA Tour

=== Asian PGA Tour wins (5) ===
No.	Date	Tournament	Winning score	Margin of victory	Runner(s)-up
1	Oct 29, 1995	Royal Perak Classic	−16 (71-70-64-67=272)	Playoff	(United States) Gregory Hanrahan
2	Dec 15, 1996	Omega PGA Championship	−12 (63-66-68-71=268)	1 stroke	(Australia) John Senden, (Australia) Jeff Wagner
3	Apr 20, 1997	DFS Galleria Guam Open	−6 (74-69-67=210) (Note: Shortened to 54 holes due to Typhoon Isa.)	3 strokes	(United States) Mike Cunning
4	Dec 13, 1998	Volvo Asian Matchplay	2 and 1		(United States) Eric Meeks
5	Feb 7, 1999	Benson & Hedges Malaysian Open^{1}	−8 (67-67-75-71=280)	3 strokes	(Germany) Alex Čejka, (United States) Bob May

^{1}Co-sanctioned by the European Tour

Asian PGA Tour playoff record (1–0)

No.	Year	Tournament	Opponent	Result
1	1995	Royal Perak Classic	(United States) Gregory Hanrahan	Won with birdie on first extra hole

=== Asia Golf Circuit wins (1) ===
No.	Date	Tournament	Winning score	Margin of victory	Runner-up
1	Feb 21, 1993	Benson & Hedges Malaysian Open	−12 (69-70-70-67=276)	1 stroke	(Fiji) Vijay Singh

=== PGA Pacific Northwest Section wins (1) ===
- 1989 PGA Assistant Professionals Championship

=== PGA Southern California Section wins (1) ===
- 1994 Palm Springs Open

=== PGA Southwest Section wins (2) ===
- 2002 Sedona Open
- 2004 Sedona Open

=== Other wins (3) ===
- 1990 El Junko Open (Venezuela)
- 1997 Mercuries Taiwan Masters, Taiwan PGA Championship

== See also ==
- List of golfers with most Asian Tour wins
