= 1996 Asian PGA Tour =

Golf tour season

1996 Asian PGA Tour season
- Duration: 14 March 1996 – 22 December 1996
- Number of official events: 22
- Most wins: (South Korea) Kang Wook-soon (2) (Thailand) Thammanoon Sriroj (2)
- Order of Merit: (South Korea) Kang Wook-soon
- Players' Player of the Year: (Thailand) Boonchu Ruangkit
- Rookie of the Year: (Australia) Jeff Wagner

The 1996 Asian PGA Tour, titled as the 1996 Omega Tour for sponsorship reasons, was the second season of the Asian PGA Tour, one of the main professional golf tours in Asia (outside of Japan) alongside the long established Asia Golf Circuit.

It was the second season of the tour under a title sponsorship agreement with Omega SA, that was announced in September 1995.

== Schedule ==
The following table lists official events during the 1996 season.

| Date | Tournament | Host country | Purse (US$) | Winner (Note: The number in brackets after each winner's name is the number of Asian PGA Tour events they had won up to and including that tournament. This information is only shown for Asian PGA Tour members.) | OWGR points | Other tours (Note: ANZ − PGA Tour of Australasia; KOR − Korean Tour.) | Notes |
|---|---|---|---|---|---|---|---|
| 17 Mar | Sabah Masters | Malaysia | 200,000 | (Thailand) Thaworn Wiratchant (1) | n/a | | New to Asian PGA Tour |
| 1 Apr | Singha Thai Prasit Bangkok Open | Thailand | 175,000 | (Thailand) Thammanoon Sriroj (1) | n/a | | New tournament |
| 21 Apr | Canlubang Classic | Philippines | 175,000 | (South Africa) Craig Kamps (1) | n/a | | |
| 28 Apr | Tournament Players Championship | Malaysia | 175,000 | (South Korea) Kang Wook-soon (1) | n/a | | |
| 5 May | Honda Invitational | Thailand | 300,000 | (Australia) Steve Elkington (n/a) | n/a | | New tournament |
| 12 May | Guam Open | Guam | 175,000 | (South Korea) Mo Joong-kyung (1) | n/a | | New tournament |
| 2 Jun | Volvo China Open | China | 400,000 | (Thailand) Prayad Marksaeng (1) | n/a | | New to Asian PGA Tour |
| 11 Aug | Canon Singapore Open | Singapore | 500,000 | (United States) John Kernohan (1) | n/a | | New to Asian PGA Tour |
| 18 Aug | Kuala Lumpur Open | Malaysia | 200,000 | (South Korea) Kang Wook-soon (2) | n/a | | New tournament |
| 25 Aug | Fila Open | South Korea | 300,000 | (South Korea) Kwon Oh-chul (1) | n/a | KOR | New tournament |
| 1 Sep | Philip Morris Asian Cup | South Korea | 300,000 | (India) Jeev Milkha Singh (3) | n/a | | New tournament |
| 29 Sep | Lexus International | Thailand | 200,000 | (Thailand) Boonchu Ruangkit (3) | n/a | | New tournament |
| 6 Oct | Yokohama Singapore PGA Championship | Singapore | 200,000 | (Taiwan) Yeh Chang-ting (2) | n/a | | |
| 18 Oct | Dubai Creek Open | UAE | 350,000 | (Eswatini) Paul Friedlander (1) | n/a | | |
| 27 Oct | Australian Players Championship | Australia | A$500,000 | (Australia) Bradley Hughes (n/a) | 16 | ANZ | New to Asian PGA Tour |
| 3 Nov | Alfred Dunhill Masters | Hong Kong | 500,000 | (Germany) Bernhard Langer (n/a) | 26 | ANZ | New to Asian PGA Tour |
| 10 Nov | Merlion Masters | Singapore | 175,000 | (United States) Peter Teravainen (1) | n/a | | |
| 17 Nov | Pakistan Steel Masters | Pakistan | 225,000 | (United States) Eric Rustand (1) | n/a | | |
| 1 Dec | Tugu Pratama Indonesian PGA Championship | Indonesia | 250,000 | (Thailand) Thammanoon Sriroj (2) | n/a | | New to Asian PGA Tour |
| 8 Dec | Royal Thai Classic | Thailand | 325,000 | (South Africa) Richard Kaplan (1) | n/a | | New tournament |
| 15 Dec | Omega PGA Championship | Hong Kong | 500,000 | (United States) Gerry Norquist (2) | n/a | | |
| 22 Dec | Asian Matchplay Championship | Indonesia | 150,000 | (China) Zhang Lianwei (2) | n/a | | Limited-field event |

== Order of Merit ==
The Order of Merit was based on prize money won during the season, calculated in U.S. dollars.

| Position | Player | Prize money ($) |
|---|---|---|
| 1 | (South Korea) Kang Wook-soon | 183,787 |
| 2 | (United States) Gerry Norquist | 129,404 |
| 3 | (Thailand) Thammanoon Sriroj | 127,422 |
| 4 | (South Africa) Craig Kamps | 119,512 |
| 5 | (Australia) Jeff Wagner | 109,570 |

== Awards ==
| Award | Winner | Ref. |
|---|---|---|
| Players' Player of the Year | (South Korea) Kang Wook-soon | |
| Rookie of the Year | (Australia) Jeff Wagner | |

== See also ==
- 1995–96 Asia Golf Circuit
