= Zambia Ladies Open =

Golf tournament

Tournament information
- Location: Ndola, Zambia
- Established: 2014
- Course(s): Ndola Golf Club
- Tour(s): Sunshine Ladies Tour
- Format: Stroke play
- Prize fund: R 750,000
- Month played: March
- Final year: 2014

Final champion
- (South Africa) Stacy Lee Bregman

The Zambia Ladies Open was a women's professional golf tournament played in Zambia.

The 2014 event, included on the Sunshine Ladies Tour, marked the first time that Zambia hosted a professional women's tournament. The field included players from Zambia, South Africa, England, Namibia, Swaziland, Sweden, Nigeria, Zimbabwe, Botswana, Kenya and Australia. It coincided with the 50th anniversary celebrations of the Zambia Ladies Golf Union.

== Winners ==
Year	Winner	Country	Venue	Score	To par	Margin of victory	Runner(s)-up	Ref
2014	Stacy Lee Bregman	South Africa	Ndola Golf Club	71-69-71=211	−8	8 strokes	(South Africa) Monique Smit (South Africa) Kim Williams	

== See also ==
- Zambia Open
