= 1998 Asian PGA Tour =

Golf tour season

1998 Asian PGA Tour season
- Duration: 5 March 1998 – 13 December 1998
- Number of official events: 19
- Most wins: (South Korea) Kang Wook-soon (2) (South Africa) Chris Williams (2)
- Order of Merit: (South Korea) Kang Wook-soon
- Players' Player of the Year: (South Africa) Chris Williams
- Rookie of the Year: (England) Ed Fryatt

The 1998 Asian PGA Tour, titled as the 1998 Omega Tour for sponsorship reasons, was the fourth season of the Asian PGA Tour, one of the main professional golf tours in Asia (outside of Japan) alongside the long established Asia Golf Circuit.

It was the fourth season of the tour under a title sponsorship agreement with Omega SA, that was announced in September 1995.

== Schedule ==
The following table lists official events during the 1998 season.

Date	Tournament	Host country	Purse (US$)	Winner (Note: The number in brackets after each winner's name is the number of Asian PGA Tour events they had won up to and including that tournament. This information is only shown for Asian PGA Tour members.)	Other tours (Note: KOR − Korean Tour.)	Notes
8 Mar	London Myanmar Open	Myanmar	200,000	(Pakistan) Taimur Hussain (1)		
15 Mar	Classic Indian Open	India	300,000	(India) Firoz Ali (1)		New to Asian PGA Tour
5 Apr	China Orient Masters	China	200,000	(Thailand) Chawalit Plaphol (1)		New tournament
19 Apr	Volvo China Open	China	400,000	(England) Ed Fryatt (1)		
3 May	Macau Open	Macau	200,000	(Japan) Satoshi Oide (1)		New tournament
17 May	Guam Open	Guam	200,000	(United States) Jerry Smith (1)		
24 May	Fila Open	South Korea	150,000	(United States) Robert Huxtable (1)	KOR	
9 Aug	Sabah Masters	Malaysia	150,000	(Scotland) Simon Yates (1)		
16 Aug	Volvo Masters of Malaysia	Malaysia	200,000	(South Africa) Chris Williams (1)		
23 Aug	Ericsson Singapore Open	Singapore	500,000	(United States) Shaun Micheel (1)		
20 Sep	Kolon Sports Korea Open	South Korea	₩350,000,000	(South Korea) Kim Dae-sub (a) (1)	KOR	New to Asian PGA Tour
18 Oct	Kuala Lumpur Open	Malaysia	200,000	(South Africa) Nico van Rensburg (2)		
25 Oct	FedEx PGA Championship	Singapore	150,000	(South Africa) Chris Williams (2)		New tournament
1 Nov	Ericsson Classic	Taiwan	200,000	(Taiwan) Lu Wen-teh (1)		New tournament
8 Nov	Hero Honda Masters	India	200,000	(India) Jyoti Randhawa (1)		
15 Nov	Thailand Open	Thailand	200,000	(South Africa) James Kingston (1)		New to Asian PGA Tour
29 Nov	Perrier Hong Kong Open	Hong Kong	300,000	(South Korea) Kang Wook-soon (3)		
6 Dec	Omega PGA Championship	Hong Kong	500,000	(South Korea) Kang Wook-soon (4)		
13 Dec	Volvo Asian Matchplay	China	200,000	(United States) Gerry Norquist (4)		Limited-field event

== Order of Merit ==
The Order of Merit was based on prize money won during the season, calculated in U.S. dollars.

Position	Player	Prize money ($)
1	(South Korea) Kang Wook-soon	150,772
2	(England) Ed Fryatt	139,448
3	(United States) Shaun Micheel	124,503
4	(South Africa) Chris Williams	124,044
5	(South Africa) Nico van Rensburg	89,368

== Awards ==
Award	Winner	Ref.
Players' Player of the Year	(South Africa) Chris Williams	
Rookie of the Year	(England) Ed Fryatt	

== See also ==
- 1997–98 Asia Golf Circuit
