= 1997 Asian PGA Tour =

Golf tour season

1997 Asian PGA Tour season
- Duration: 6 February 1997 – 20 December 1997
- Number of official events: 22
- Most wins: (Thailand) Prayad Marksaeng (2)
- Order of Merit: (United States) Mike Cunning
- Players' Player of the Year: (Thailand) Prayad Marksaeng
- Rookie of the Year: (United States) Ted Purdy

The 1997 Asian PGA Tour, titled as the 1997 Omega Tour for sponsorship reasons, was the third season of the Asian PGA Tour, one of the main professional golf tours in Asia (outside of Japan) alongside the long established Asia Golf Circuit.

It was the third season of the tour under a title sponsorship agreement with Omega SA, that was announced in September 1995.

== Schedule ==
The following table lists official events during the 1997 season.

Date	Tournament	Host country	Purse (US$)	Winner (Note: The number in brackets after each winner's name is the number of Asian PGA Tour events they had won up to and including that tournament. This information is only shown for Asian PGA Tour members.)	OWGR points	Other tours (Note: ANZ − PGA Tour of Australasia.)	Notes
9 Feb	Asian Honda Classic	Thailand	300,000	(United States) Tiger Woods (n/a)	n/a		
30 Mar	Vietnam Open	Vietnam	200,000	(Australia) Andrew Bonhomme (1)	n/a		
13 Apr	London Myanmar Open	Myanmar	200,000	(Thailand) Boonchu Ruangkit (4)	n/a		
20 Apr	DFS Galleria Guam Open	Guam	200,000	(United States) Gerry Norquist (3)	n/a		
27 Apr	Satelindo Indonesia Open	Indonesia	200,000	(Australia) Craig Parry (1)	n/a		New to Asian PGA Tour
18 May	Volvo China Open	China	400,000	(China) Cheng Jun (1)	n/a		
10 Aug	Sabah Masters	Malaysia	200,000	(South Africa) Des Terblanche (1)	n/a		
17 Aug	SingTel Ericsson Singapore Open	Singapore	200,000	(Myanmar) Zaw Moe (1)	n/a		
7 Sep	Philip Morris Asian Cup	South Korea	400,000	(South Korea) Park No-seok (1)	n/a		
14 Sep	Ericsson Asia-Pacific Masters	Indonesia	500,000	(Australia) Darren Cole (1)	16	ANZ	New tournament
21 Sep	Mild Seven Kuala Lumpur Open	Malaysia	300,000	(South Korea) Charlie Wi (1)	n/a		
12 Oct	Yokohama Singapore PGA Championship	Singapore	150,000	(Thailand) Prayad Marksaeng (1)	n/a		
19 Oct	ABN-AMRO Pakistan Masters	Pakistan	200,000	(Thailand) Thammanoon Sriroj (3)	n/a		
26 Oct	Dubai Creek Open	UAE	250,000	(Australia) Adrian Percey (1)	n/a		
2 Nov	Hero Honda Masters	India	200,000	(United States) Ted Purdy (1)	n/a		New tournament
9 Nov	Ta-Shee Open	Taiwan	250,000	(Taiwan) Wang Ter-chang (1)	n/a		New tournament
16 Nov	Volvo Masters of Malaysia	Malaysia	200,000	(United States) Christian Peña (1)	n/a		New to Asian PGA Tour
23 Nov	Lexus Thai International	Thailand	200,000	(Thailand) Prayad Marksaeng (2)	n/a		
30 Nov	Tugu Pratama Indonesian PGA Championship	Indonesia	200,000	(United States) Clay Devers (2)	n/a		
7 Dec	Andersen Consulting Hong Kong Open	Hong Kong	350,000	(New Zealand) Frank Nobilo (1)	n/a		New to Asian PGA Tour
14 Dec	Omega PGA Championship	Hong Kong	500,000	(Philippines) Rodrigo Cuello (1)	n/a		
20 Dec	Volvo Asian Matchplay	Philippines	250,000	(South Africa) Des Terblanche (2)	n/a		Limited-field event

== Order of Merit ==
The Order of Merit was based on prize money won during the season, calculated in U.S. dollars.

Position	Player	Prize money ($)
1	(United States) Mike Cunning	170,619
2	(Thailand) Prayad Marksaeng	123,805
3	(Taiwan) Lu Wen-teh	114,716
4	(United States) Ted Purdy	111,573
5	(India) Jeev Milkha Singh	110,840

== Awards ==
Award	Winner	Ref.
Players' Player of the Year	(Thailand) Prayad Marksaeng	
Rookie of the Year	(United States) Ted Purdy	

== See also ==
- 1996–97 Asia Golf Circuit
