= Brunei Ladies Open =

Tournament information
- Location: Jerudong, Brunei
- Established: 2018
- Course(s): Empire Hotel & Country Club
- Par: 71
- Length: 6,397
- Tour(s): LPGA of Korea Tour; China LPGA Tour; Brunei Golf Association
- Format: Stroke play – 54 holes
- Prize fund: KRW 700,000,000
- Month played: March
- Final year: 2018

The Brunei Ladies Open was a women's professional golf tournament in Brunei tri-sanctioned by the China LPGA Tour, the Brunei Golf Association and the LPGA of Korea Tour (KLPGA).

== Winner ==
Date	Winner	Score	Margin of victory	Runners-up
17–19 Mar 2018	(South Korea) Hong Ran	−19 (64-67-64=195)	5 strokes	(South Korea) Choi Ka-ram (South Korea) Ji Han-sol (South Korea) Han Jin-seon (South Korea) Jang Eun-soo
