= Thongchai Jaidee =

Thai professional golfer (born 1969)

Thongchai Jaidee ธงชัย ใจดี
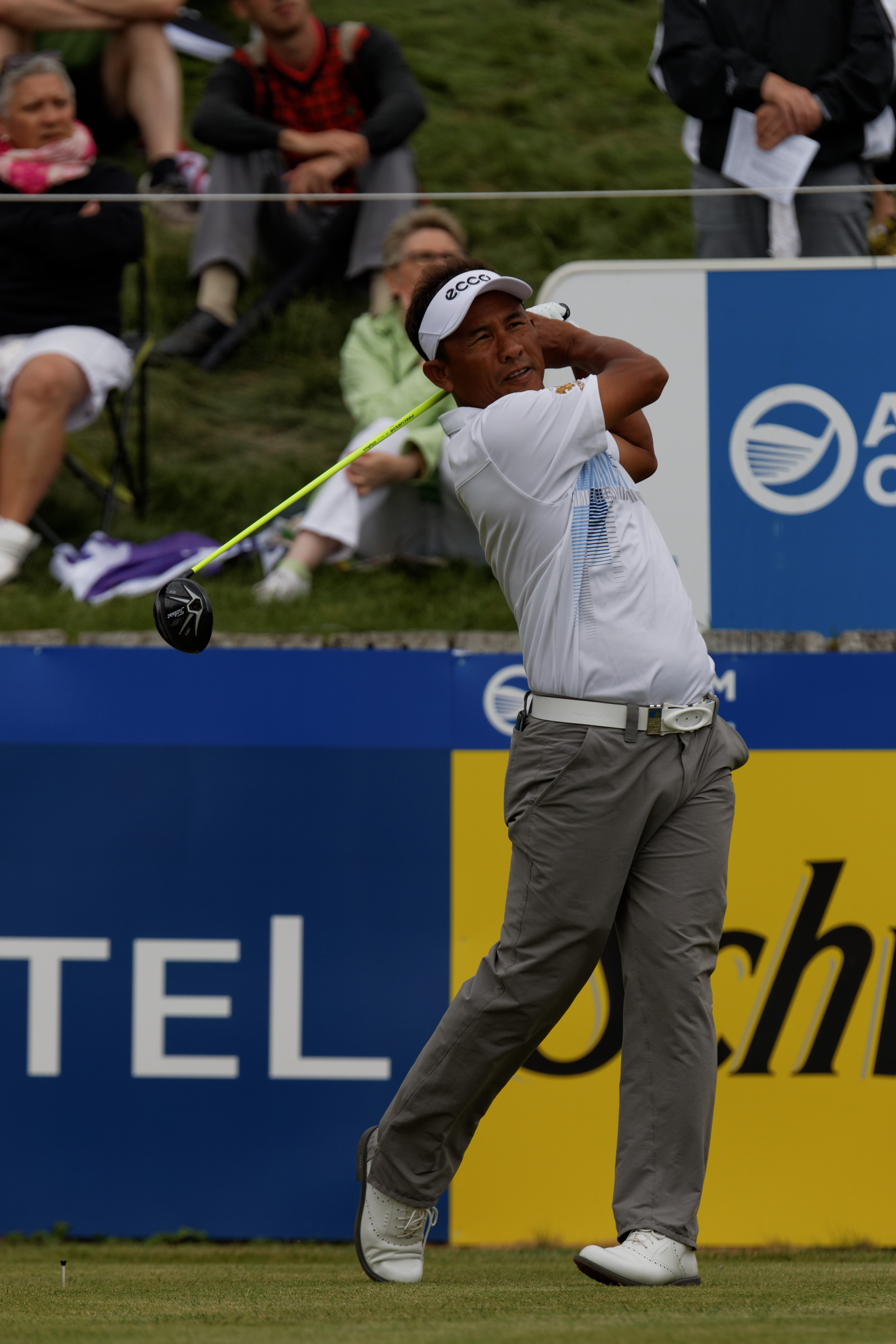

Personal information
- Nationality: Thailand
- Born: 8 November 1969 (age 56) Lopburi, Thailand
- Height: 1.70 m (5 ft 7 in)
- Weight: 63 kg (139 lb; 9.9 st)
- Spouse: Namfon Latkrathok (m. 1998)
- Children: 2

Career
- Sport: Golf
- Turned professional: 1999
- Current tours: Asian Tour; PGA Tour Champions; European Senior Tour
- Former tour: European Tour
- Professional wins: 22
- Highest ranking: 27 (3 January 2016)

Number of wins by tour
- European Tour: 8
- Asian Tour: 13 (2nd all-time)
- PGA Tour Champions: 2
- Other: 3

Best results in major championships
- Masters Tournament: T37: 2014
- PGA Championship: T36: 2009
- U.S. Open: T47: 2010
- The Open Championship: T13: 2009

Achievements and awards
- Asian Tour Order of Merit winner: 2001, 2004, 2009
- Asian Tour Players' Player of the Year: 2001, 2004, 2009

Thongchai Jaidee (Thai: ธงชัย ใจดี; RTGS: Thongchai Chaidi, born 8 November 1969) is a Thai professional golfer who plays on the PGA Tour Champions. He formerly played on the Asian Tour and the European Tour. On the Asian Tour, he holds the record for the most career earnings and is second in victories having won 13 times. He has won the Order of Merit on the Asian Tour three times during his career. Jaidee was the first man to win US$2 million, US$3 million, US$4 million, and US$5 million on the Asian Tour in prize money.

== Early life ==
Jaidee did not start playing golf until he was sixteen, and he later went into the Royal Thai Army where he was a paratrooper in special forces.

== Professional career ==
Jaidee did not turn professional until he was thirty years old, but he soon achieved success on the Asian Tour, winning the Asian Tour Order of Merit in 2001 and 2004. He first played in a major championship in the 2001 U.S. Open and finished tied 74th. In February 2004 he became the first Thai to win a tournament on the European Tour by winning the Carlsberg Malaysian Open, an event which was co-sanctioned with the Asian Tour. In 2005, he successfully defended his Malaysian Open title.

In 2006 he received a special invitation to play in the Masters Tournament. He was the second Thai to play in the Masters after Sukree Onsham, who did so in 1970 and 1971, and by doing so, he became the first Thai to play in all four major championships.

After his victory in the Volvo Masters of Asia in 2006 he reached 75 in the Official World Golf Rankings. His best year-end ranking on the European Order of Merit has been 9th in 2013. He topped the Asian Tour order of merit for a third time in 2009.

Jaidee won for the fifth time on the European Tour in June 2012 at the ISPS Handa Wales Open. This was the first occasion that Jaidee had won on the European Tour outside Asia. He shot a final round one over 72, but won by a single stroke from four other players.

Jaidee qualified for the 2015 Presidents Cup squad for the first time and in doing so became the first player from Thailand to earn the honor. He won 1.5 points from 3 matches.

In September 2015, Jaidee won his seventh European Tour title at the Porsche European Open in Germany by a single stroke over Englishman Graeme Storm. Jaidee held the 54-hole lead by a stroke and shot a 67 in the final round to claim victory.

Jaidee claimed his eighth European Tour victory in July 2016, with a four-stroke victory at the Open de France. He shot weekend rounds of 68-68, which included a run of 39 holes without a bogey and moved him clear of the chasing pack. Jaidee became the oldest winner of the tournament, at the age of 46, since it became part of the European Tour in 1972.

== Amateur wins ==
- 1995 Pakistan Open Amateur Championship
- 1997 Putra Cup
- 1998 Putra Cup, Singapore Open Amateur Championship, Thailand Open Amateur Championship

== Professional wins (22) ==
=== European Tour wins (8) ===
| No. | Date | Tournament | Winning score | Margin of victory | Runner(s)-up |
|---|---|---|---|---|---|
| 1 | 22 Feb 2004 | Carlsberg Malaysian Open^{1} | −14 (71-71-64-68=274) | 2 strokes | (Australia) Brad Kennedy |
| 2 | 20 Feb 2005 | Carlsberg Malaysian Open^{1} (2) | −21 (64-66-67-70=267) | 3 strokes | (India) Jyoti Randhawa |
| 3 | 1 Mar 2009 | Enjoy Jakarta Indonesia Open^{1} | −12 (71-69-67-69=276) | 2 strokes | (England) Simon Dyson, (Sweden) Alex Norén, (England) Steve Webster |
| 4 | 26 Apr 2009 | Ballantine's Championship^{1,2} | −4 (66-71-77-70=284) | Playoff | (Spain) Gonzalo Fernández-Castaño, (South Korea) Kang Sung-hoon |
| 5 | 3 Jun 2012 | ISPS Handa Wales Open | −6 (71-68-67-72=278) | 1 stroke | (Denmark) Thomas Bjørn, (Spain) Gonzalo Fernández-Castaño, (Netherlands) Joost Luiten, (South Africa) Richard Sterne |
| 6 | 1 Jun 2014 | Nordea Masters | −16 (69-70-68-65=272) | Playoff | (France) Victor Dubuisson, (Scotland) Stephen Gallacher |
| 7 | 27 Sep 2015 | Porsche European Open | −17 (68-68-64-67=267) | 1 stroke | (England) Graeme Storm |
| 8 | 3 Jul 2016 | Open de France | −11 (67-70-68-68=273) | 4 strokes | (Italy) Francesco Molinari |

^{1}Co-sanctioned by the Asian Tour
^{2}Co-sanctioned by the Korean Tour

European Tour playoff record (2–0)

| No. | Year | Tournament | Opponents | Result |
|---|---|---|---|---|
| 1 | 2009 | Ballantine's Championship | (Spain) Gonzalo Fernández-Castaño, (South Korea) Kang Sung-hoon | Won with birdie on first extra hole |
| 2 | 2014 | Nordea Masters | (France) Victor Dubuisson, (Scotland) Stephen Gallacher | Won with birdie on first extra hole |

=== Asian Tour wins (13) ===
| No. | Date | Tournament | Winning score | Margin of victory | Runner(s)-up |
|---|---|---|---|---|---|
| 1 | 8 Oct 2000 | Kolon Cup Korea Open^{1} | −10 (70-69-69-70=278) | 1 stroke | (South Africa) Craig Kamps |
| 2 | 18 Mar 2001 | Wills Indian Open | −17 (67-69-69-66=271) | 1 stroke | (Scotland) Ross Bain |
| 3 | 10 Feb 2002 | London Myanmar Open | −11 (69-70-69-69=277) | Playoff | (United States) Edward Loar |
| 4 | 14 Dec 2003 | Volvo Masters of Asia | −19 (71-64-65-65=265) | 1 stroke | (Taiwan) Lin Keng-chi |
| 5 | 15 Feb 2004 | Myanmar Open (2) | −12 (69-72-66-69=276) | 3 strokes | (United States) Andrew Pitts |
| 6 | 22 Feb 2004 | Carlsberg Malaysian Open^{2} | −14 (71-71-64-68=274) | 2 strokes | (Australia) Brad Kennedy |
| 7 | 20 Feb 2005 | Carlsberg Malaysian Open^{2} (2) | −21 (64-66-67-70=267) | 3 strokes | (India) Jyoti Randhawa |
| 8 | 17 Dec 2006 | Volvo Masters of Asia (2) | −11 (68-68-69-72=277) | 1 stroke | (Philippines) Frankie Miñoza |
| 9 | 7 Dec 2008 | Hana Bank Vietnam Masters | −15 (67-69-70-67=273) | Playoff | (Wales) Rhys Davies, (Australia) Andrew Dodt |
| 10 | 14 Dec 2008 | Johnnie Walker Cambodian Open | −24 (68-66-64-66=264) | 6 strokes | (Singapore) Lam Chih Bing |
| 11 | 1 Mar 2009 | Enjoy Jakarta Indonesia Open^{2} | −12 (71-69-67-69=276) | 2 strokes | (England) Simon Dyson, (Sweden) Alex Norén, (England) Steve Webster |
| 12 | 26 Apr 2009 | Ballantine's Championship^{1,2} | −4 (66-71-77-70=280) | Playoff | (Spain) Gonzalo Fernández-Castaño, (South Korea) Kang Sung-hoon |
| 13 | 12 Dec 2010 | Johnnie Walker Cambodian Open (2) | −21 (70-67-65-65=267) | 4 strokes | (Japan) Kenichi Kuboya |

^{1}Co-sanctioned by the Korean Tour
^{2}Co-sanctioned by the European Tour

Asian Tour playoff record (3–0)

| No. | Year | Tournament | Opponent(s) | Result |
|---|---|---|---|---|
| 1 | 2002 | London Myanmar Open | (United States) Edward Loar | Won with par on first extra hole |
| 2 | 2008 | Hana Bank Vietnam Masters | (Wales) Rhys Davies, (Australia) Andrew Dodt | Won with par on third extra hole Dodt eliminated by birdie on second hole |
| 3 | 2009 | Ballantine's Championship | (Spain) Gonzalo Fernández-Castaño, (South Korea) Kang Sung-hoon | Won with birdie on first extra hole |

=== Other wins (3) ===
- 2000 Singha Bangkok Open (Thailand)
- 2001 Singha Bangkok Open (Thailand)
- 2019 GolfSixes Cascais (with Phachara Khongwatmai)

=== PGA Tour Champions wins (2) ===
| No. | Date | Tournament | Winning score | Margin of victory | Runner-up |
|---|---|---|---|---|---|
| 1 | 12 Jun 2022 | American Family Insurance Championship | −14 (69-65-68=202) | 1 stroke | (United States) Tom Pernice Jr. |
| 2 | 24 Sep 2023 | PURE Insurance Championship | −14 (70-65-67=202) | Playoff | (United States) Justin Leonard |

PGA Tour Champions playoff record (1–0)

| No. | Year | Tournament | Opponent | Result |
|---|---|---|---|---|
| 1 | 2023 | PURE Insurance Championship | (United States) Justin Leonard | Won with par on fourth extra hole |

== Results in major championships ==
| Tournament | 2001 | 2002 | 2003 | 2004 | 2005 | 2006 | 2007 | 2008 | 2009 |
|---|---|---|---|---|---|---|---|---|---|
| Masters Tournament | | | | | | CUT | | | |
| U.S. Open | T74 | | | | | | | | |
| The Open Championship | | WD | | | T52 | | | | T13 |
| PGA Championship | | | | CUT | CUT | | CUT | | T36 |

| Tournament | 2010 | 2011 | 2012 | 2013 | 2014 | 2015 | 2016 | 2017 |
|---|---|---|---|---|---|---|---|---|
| Masters Tournament | WD | | | | T37 | 55 | 57 | |
| U.S. Open | T47 | | | CUT | CUT | CUT | | |
| The Open Championship | CUT | CUT | T77 | T32 | T39 | T65 | T22 | T27 |
| PGA Championship | CUT | | CUT | T47 | CUT | CUT | T73 | CUT |

Did not play

CUT = missed the half-way cut
WD = Withdrew
"T" = tied

=== Summary ===
| Tournament | Wins | 2nd | 3rd | Top-5 | Top-10 | Top-25 | Events | Cuts made |
|---|---|---|---|---|---|---|---|---|
| Masters Tournament | 0 | 0 | 0 | 0 | 0 | 0 | 5 | 3 |
| U.S. Open | 0 | 0 | 0 | 0 | 0 | 0 | 5 | 2 |
| The Open Championship | 0 | 0 | 0 | 0 | 0 | 2 | 11 | 8 |
| PGA Championship | 0 | 0 | 0 | 0 | 0 | 0 | 11 | 3 |
| Totals | 0 | 0 | 0 | 0 | 0 | 2 | 32 | 16 |

- Most consecutive cuts made – 4 (2016 Masters – 2017 Open Championship)
- Longest streak of top-10s – 0

== Results in The Players Championship ==
| Tournament | 2009 | 2010 | 2011 | 2012 | 2013 | 2014 | 2015 |
|---|---|---|---|---|---|---|---|
| The Players Championship | CUT | CUT | | | | CUT | CUT |

Did not play

CUT = missed the halfway cut

== Results in World Golf Championships ==
Results not in chronological order prior to 2015.

| Tournament | 2002 | 2003 | 2004 | 2005 | 2006 | 2007 | 2008 | 2009 | 2010 | 2011 | 2012 | 2013 | 2014 | 2015 | 2016 | 2017 |
|---|---|---|---|---|---|---|---|---|---|---|---|---|---|---|---|---|
| Championship | T57 | T66 | T41 | 60 | T9 | T23 | | | T56 | | | | T6 | 69 | | |
| Match Play | | | | | | | | | QF | | | R64 | R64 | T34 | T28 | T39 |
| Invitational | | | T32 | T58 | | T46 | | T60 | | | WD | | T52 | T57 | | T63 |
| Champions | | | | | | | | T19 | | T29 | T21 | T46 | T41 | T11 | T30 | |

Top 10
Did not play

WD = Withdrew
QF, R16, R32, R64 = Round in which player lost in match play
"T" = Tied
Note that the HSBC Champions did not become a WGC event until 2009.

== Results in senior major championships ==
Results not in chronological order

| Tournament | 2021 | 2022 | 2023 | 2024 | 2025 | 2026 |
|---|---|---|---|---|---|---|
| Senior PGA Championship | T23 | T17 | T20 | WD | CUT | T22 |
| The Tradition | | | T23 | T22 | T19 | T15 |
| U.S. Senior Open | T34 | T4 | CUT | T5 | T61 | 58 |
| Senior Players Championship | | T17 | | T40 | T46 | T67 |
| The Senior Open Championship | WD | T3 | T20 | | | T32 |

Top 10
Did not play

CUT = missed the halfway cut
WD = withdrew
"T" indicates a tie for a place

== Team appearances ==
- Dynasty Cup (representing Asia): 2003 (winners), 2005 (winners)
- Royal Trophy (representing Asia): 2006, 2007, 2009 (winners), 2010, 2011, 2013
- World Cup (representing Thailand): 2007, 2008, 2009, 2011, 2016
- EurAsia Cup (representing Asia): 2014 (playing captain), 2016
- Presidents Cup (representing the International team): 2015
- Amata Friendship Cup (representing Thailand): 2018 (winners)

== See also ==
- List of golfers with most Asian Tour wins
- List of golfers with most European Tour wins
