= Kang Wook-soon =

South Korean golfer (born 1966)

Personal information
- Nationality: South Korea
- Born: 2 June 1966 (age 60) Yeongdeok, Gyeongsangbuk-do, South Korea
- Height: 5 ft 8 in (1.73 m)

Career
- Sport: Golf
- Turned professional: 1989
- Former tours: Asian Tour; Nationwide Tour; Korean Tour
- Professional wins: 17

Number of wins by tour
- Asian Tour: 7 (Tied-9th all-time)
- Other: 10

Achievements and awards
- Asian PGA Tour Order of Merit winner: 1996, 1998
- Asian PGA Tour Players' Player of the Year: 1996
- Korean Tour Order of Merit winner: 1999, 2002
- Korean Tour Player of the Year: 1999, 2000, 2001

Kang Wook-soon (Korean: 강욱순; born 2 June 1966) is a South Korean professional golfer.

== Professional career ==
Kang has played on the Asian Tour since it began in its modern form in 1995. He topped the Order of Merit in 1996 and 1998 and was the first man to reach career earnings of US$500,000 on the tour. In 2002 he was the top player on the Korean Tour. In 2003 he missed out on a PGA Tour card by one shot after three-putting the last hole of Final Qualifying to make bogey. He still qualified to play the Nationwide Tour in 2004, but despite recording a top ten finish in his third outing he left after six events. He has seven career wins on the Asian Tour and a ten wins on the Korean Tour; including three Order of Merits wins in 1999, 2000 and 2001.

== Professional wins (17) ==
=== Asian PGA Tour wins (7) ===
No.	Date	Tournament	Winning score	Margin of victory	Runner(s)-up
1	28 Apr 1996	Tournament Players Championship	−13 (70-68-67-70=275)	Playoff	(Japan) Go Higaki
2	18 Aug 1996	Kuala Lumpur Open	−13 (69-68-68-70=275)	1 stroke	(Australia) Brad Andrews, (Scotland) Kenny Walker
3	29 Nov 1998	Perrier Hong Kong Open	−8 (69-70-66-67=272)	2 strokes	(England) Ed Fryatt
4	10 Dec 1998	Omega PGA Championship	−17 (66-65-66-66=263)	3 strokes	(Taiwan) Hsieh Chin-sheng
5	5 Sep 1999	ERA Taiwan Open	−14 (68-70-67-69=274)	1 stroke	(Myanmar) Kyi Hla Han
6	30 Apr 2000	Maekyung LG Fashion Open^{1}	−10 (67-69-73-69=278)	1 stroke	(Australia) Kim Felton
7	4 Feb 2001	Grohe Thailand Masters	−24 (67-65-66-66=264)	5 strokes	(Thailand) Thongchai Jaidee

^{1}Co-sanctioned by the Korean Tour

Asian PGA Tour playoff record (1–2)

No.	Year	Tournament	Opponent(s)	Result
1	1996	Canlubang Classic	(South Africa) Craig Kamps	Lost to par on first extra hole
2	1996	Tournament Players Championship	(Japan) Go Higaki	Won with par on first extra hole
3	2001	SK Telecom Open	(South Korea) Charlie Wi, (Scotland) Simon Yates	Wi won with birdie on seventh extra hole Yates eliminated by birdie on fifth hole

=== Korean Tour wins (11) ===
No.	Date	Tournament	Winning score	Margin of victory	Runner(s)-up
1	27 May 1995	Daily Sports Pocari Open	−16 (66-72-66-68=272)	1 stroke	(South Korea) Choi Sang-ho, (South Korea) Park Nam-sin
2	14 Oct 1995	Champion Series	−6 (70-68=138)	1 stroke	(South Korea) Kim Jong-duck, (South Korea) Kim Jong-il, (South Korea) Park Nam-sin
3	22 Aug 1999	Bookyung Open	−15 (65-67-71-70=273)	1 stroke	(South Korea) Shin Yong-jin
4	29 Aug 1999	Lance Field KPGA Championship	−8 (69-67-72-72=280)	Playoff	(South Korea) Shin Yong-jin
5	30 Apr 2000	Maekyung LG Fashion Open^{1}	−10 (67-69-73-69=278)	1 stroke	(Australia) Kim Felton
6	3 Sep 2000	Leading Investment & Securities Open	−16 (66-70-68-68=272)	5 strokes	(South Korea) Jang Ik-jae
7	19 Oct 2000	Daekyung Open	−18 (67-67-68-68=270)	4 strokes	(South Korea) Kwak Heung-so
8	19 May 2002	Pocari Energy Open	−13 (72-67-68-68=275)	1 stroke	(South Korea) Choi Gwang-soo, (South Korea) Jang Ik-jae, (South Korea) Kim Dae-sub, (South Korea) Lee In-woo, (South Korea) Park Nam-sin, (South Korea) Shin Yong-jin
9	3 Aug 2003	Lancelot Cup Bookyung Open (2)	−20 (69-66-65-68=268)	6 strokes	(South Korea) Park Nam-sin, (South Korea) Yang Yong-eun
10	31 Aug 2008	SBS Johnnie Walker Blue Label Open	−12 (67-71-68-70=276)	2 strokes	(South Korea) Joo Heung-chol, (South Korea) Kim Hyung-sung, (South Korea) Lee Tae-hee, (South Korea) Park Do-kyu
11	12 Apr 2009	SBS Tomato Savings Bank Open	−8 (67-68-75-70=280)	Playoff	(South Korea) Chung Joon

^{1}Co-sanctioned by the Asian PGA Tour

Korean Tour playoff record (2–3)

No.	Year	Tournament	Opponent(s)	Result
1	1999	Lance Field KPGA Championship	(South Korea) Shin Yong-jin	Won with birdie on third extra hole
2	2001	SK Telecom Open	(South Korea) Charlie Wi, (Scotland) Simon Yates	Wi won with birdie on seventh extra hole Yates eliminated by birdie on fifth hole
3	2007	SBS Lake Hills Open	(South Korea) Kang Kyung-nam, (South Korea) Ted Oh	Kang Kyung-nam won with birdie on first extra hole
4	2009	SBS Tomato Savings Bank Open	(South Korea) Chung Joon	Won with par on third extra hole
5	2010	Dongbu Insurance Promy Gunsan CC Open	(South Korea) Kang Kyung-nam, (South Korea) Kim Do-hoon	Kim won with birdie on sixth extra hole Kang Wook-soon eliminated by par on first hole

== Team appearances ==
- Alfred Dunhill Cup (representing South Korea): 1997, 1998
- Asian Nations Cup (representing South Korea): 1999 (with Kim Wan-tae, winners)
- World Cup (representing South Korea): 1999
- Dynasty Cup (representing Asia): 2003 (winners)

== See also ==
- List of golfers with most Asian Tour wins
