= Asian Tour =

Professional golf tour

- Current season, competition or edition: 2026 Asian Tour
- Formerly: Asian PGA Tour; Omega Tour; Davidoff Tour
- Sport: Golf
- Founded: 1994
- First season: 1995
- CEO: Cho Minn Thant
- Director: Jimmy Masrin
- Countries: Based in Asia (Note: Schedules have also included events in Australia, Egypt, England, Fiji, Mauritius, Morocco, New Zealand, Scotland, South Africa and Switzerland.)
- Most titles: Order of Merit titles: (Thailand) Thongchai Jaidee (3); Tournament wins: (Thailand) Thaworn Wiratchant (18)
- Related competitions: Asian Development Tour
- Website: http://www.asiantour.com/

The Asian Tour is the principal men's professional golf tour in Asia except for Japan (which has its own Japan Golf Tour). It is also a full member of the International Federation of PGA Tours. Official money events on the tour count for Official World Golf Ranking points.

The Asian Tour is administered from Singapore. It is controlled by a board with a majority of professional golfers, and a Tournament Players Committee of its player members, supported by an executive team. The chairman of the board is the Indonesian businessman Jimmy Masrin.

== History ==
The Asian PGA was formed in July 1994 at a meeting in Hong Kong attended by PGA representatives from eight countries. The first season of the APGA Omega Tour, as it was known for sponsorship reasons, was played in 1995 and within a few years it had supplanted the existing tour in the region, the Asia Golf Circuit that was run by the Asia Pacific Golf Confederation, as the leading golf tour in Asia outside of Japan. In 1998 the Asian Tour became the sixth member of the International Federation of PGA Tours. Under a new sponsorship deal, between 1999 and 2003 the tour was known as the Davidoff Tour, before adopting its current name in 2004.

In 2002, the tour moved its office from Hong Kong to Malaysia and in 2004 the tour was taken over by a new organisation established by the players, who had been in dispute with the previous management. In 2007 it moved to new headquarters on the resort island of Sentosa in Singapore, which is also the home to what was at that time the tour's richest sole sanctioned tournament, the Singapore Open.

In 2009 a rival tour, the OneAsia Tour, was established. Relations between the two tours are hostile.

In 2010, the Asian Tour launched the Asian Development Tour (ADT) as a developmental circuit. Five events were played the first year. By 2015 the tour had expanded to holding 28 tournaments with US$2.2 million of prize money.

With LIV Golf's initial investment in the Asian Tour having been reported in late 2021. The 2022 season marked the introduction of the International Series, which was unveiled in February. The series was to consist of 10 events to be added to Asian Tour schedules over the following 10 years, with each event featuring prize funds between US$1,500,000 and $2,000,000. The investment being primarily backed by LIV Golf.

In July 2026, the Asian Tour entered a strategic alliance with the PGA Tour and the European Tour, effective through at least 2029. The partnership provided for at least two co-sanctioned Asian Tour events in each of the following three years and aimed to create additional pathways for Asian Tour players to compete on European circuits.

== Players ==
Most of the leading players on the tour are Asian, but players from other parts of the world also participate (as of 2007 the country with most representatives profiled on the tour's official site is Australia).

In 2006, the Asian Tour became the most prestigious men's tour on which a woman has made the half-way cut in recent times when Michelle Wie did so at the SK Telecom Open in South Korea.

Among the ways to obtain an Asian Tour card is to be among the top 35 (including ties) at the Tour's qualifying school, finishing in the top 5 of the Asian Development Tour Order of Merit, and placing in the top 60 of the previous season's Order of Merit. The winner of the Asian Tour Order of Merit also receives entry into The Open Championship.

== Tournaments and prize money ==
Each year the Asian Tour co-sanctions a number of events with the European Tour, with these events offering higher prize funds than most of the other tournaments on the tour as a result. While most of these tournaments have been in Asia, the Omega European Masters in Switzerland has been co-sanctioned from 2009 to 2017. In addition, the two tours sometimes tri-sanction events with the Sunshine Tour or PGA Tour of Australasia in those tours' respective regions. The Asian Tour also co-sanctions tournaments with the Japan Golf Tour.

Since 2008, 50 percent of players' earnings from the US Open and The Open Championship have counted towards the Asian Tour's Order of Merit. The two Opens were singled out from the other majors because they have open qualifying which Asian Tour members may enter.

Formerly Asia's richest event, the HSBC Champions, was first played in November 2005 with a prize fund of $5 million. The tournament was co-sanctioned by the Asian Tour and the earnings were counted towards the money list for its first three years before it became a World Golf Championships event in 2009.

Another limited-field event in Malaysia; the CIMB Classic, was launched in 2010 with a $6 million purse. The first Asian Tour event to be co-sanctioned by the U.S.-based PGA Tour began as an unofficial event on that tour, but it started to offer official money and FedEx Cup points in 2013.

In 2016, the tour's richest sole-sanctioned event was the Venetian Macao Open, with a prize fund of $1.1 million.

In 2022, the Saudi International became the tour's flagship event and as a result became its richest sole-sanctioned event.

== Order of Merit winners ==
Season	Winner	Points
2026	(Thailand) Pavit Tangkamolprasert	1,374
2025	(Japan) Kazuki Higa	2,082
2024	(United States) John Catlin	3,130
2023	(United States) Andy Ogletree	2,129
Season	Winner	Prize money (US$)
2022	(United States) Sihwan Kim	627,458
2020–21–22	(South Korea) Tom Kim	507,553
2019	(Thailand) Jazz Janewattananond	1,058,524
2018	(India) Shubhankar Sharma	755,994
2017	(Malaysia) Gavin Green	585,813
2016	(Australia) Scott Hend	1,004,792
2015	(India) Anirban Lahiri	1,139,084
2014	(United States) David Lipsky	713,901
2013	(Thailand) Kiradech Aphibarnrat	1,127,855
2012	(Thailand) Thaworn Wiratchant (2)	738,047
2011	(Philippines) Juvic Pagunsan	788,299
2010	(South Korea) Noh Seung-yul	822,361
2009	(Thailand) Thongchai Jaidee (3)	981,932
2008	(India) Jeev Milkha Singh (2)	1,452,702
2007	(China) Liang Wenchong	532,590
2006	(India) Jeev Milkha Singh	591,884
2005	(Thailand) Thaworn Wiratchant	510,122
2004	(Thailand) Thongchai Jaidee (2)	381,930
2003	(India) Arjun Atwal	284,018
2002	(India) Jyoti Randhawa	266,263
2001	(Thailand) Thongchai Jaidee	353,060
2000	(England) Simon Dyson	282,370
1999	(Myanmar) Kyi Hla Han	204,210
1998	(South Korea) Kang Wook-soon (2)	150,772
1997	(United States) Mike Cunning	170,619
1996	(South Korea) Kang Wook-soon	183,787
1995	(Taiwan) Lin Keng-chi	177,856

=== Multiple winners ===
Rank	Player	Wins	Years won
1	(Thailand) Thongchai Jaidee	3	2001, 2004, 2009
T2	(South Korea) Kang Wook-soon	2	1996, 1998
T2	(India) Jeev Milkha Singh	2	2006, 2008
T2	(Thailand) Thaworn Wiratchant	2	2005, 2012

== Awards ==
Season	Player of the Year	Rookie of the Year
2026		(South Korea) Song Min-hyuk
2025	(Japan) Kazuki Higa	(United States) Ollie Schniederjans
2024	(United States) John Catlin (2)	(Italy) Stefano Mazzoli
2023	(United States) Andy Ogletree	(Hong Kong) Kho Taichi
Season	Players' Player of the Year	Rookie of the Year
2022	(United States) Sihwan Kim	(South Korea) Kim Bi-o
2020–21–22	No awards	
2019	(Thailand) Jazz Janewattananond	(Thailand) Sadom Kaewkanjana
2018	(United States) John Catlin	(South Korea) Park Sang-hyun
2017	(Malaysia) Gavin Green	(United States) Micah Lauren Shin
2016	(Australia) Scott Hend	(Zimbabwe) Scott Vincent
2015	(India) Anirban Lahiri (2)	(Thailand) Natipong Srithong
2014	(India) Anirban Lahiri	(Australia) Cameron Smith
2013	(Thailand) Kiradech Aphibarnrat	(Canada) Richard T. Lee
2012	(Thailand) Thaworn Wiratchant (2)	(Japan) Masanori Kobayashi
2011	(Philippines) Juvic Pagunsan	(South Africa) Tjaart van der Walt
2010	(South Korea) Noh Seung-yul	(Sweden) Rikard Karlberg
2009	(Thailand) Thongchai Jaidee (3)	(India) Chinnaswamy Muniyappa
2008	(India) Jeev Milkha Singh (2)	(South Korea) Noh Seung-yul
2007	(China) Liang Wenchong	(Australia) Scott Hend
2006	(India) Jeev Milkha Singh	(Philippines) Juvic Pagunsan
2005	(Thailand) Thaworn Wiratchant	(India) Shiv Kapur
2004	(Thailand) Thongchai Jaidee (2)	(Australia) Adam Groom
2003	(India) Arjun Atwal	(Australia) Marcus Both
2002	(India) Jyoti Randhawa	(United States) Kevin Na
2001	(Thailand) Thongchai Jaidee	(South Korea) Ted Oh
2000	(England) Simon Dyson	(England) Simon Dyson
1999	(Myanmar) Kyi Hla Han	(Australia) Kenny Druce
1998	(South Africa) Chris Williams	(England) Ed Fryatt
1997	(Thailand) Prayad Marksaeng	(United States) Ted Purdy
1996	(South Korea) Kang Wook-soon	(Australia) Jeff Wagner
1995	(Taiwan) Lin Keng-chi	(India) Arjun Atwal

== Leading career money winners ==
The table below shows the leading money winners on the Asian Tour as of 16 October 2016. The official site has a top 100 list which also shows each player's winnings for 1995 to 2016.

Rank	Player	Prize money (US$)
1	(Thailand) Thongchai Jaidee	5,485,537
2	(Thailand) Thaworn Wiratchant	4,493,844
3	(Australia) Scott Hend	3,795,696
4	(Thailand) Prayad Marksaeng	3,533,551
5	(India) Jeev Milkha Singh	3,487,029
6	(India) Jyoti Randhawa	3,455,859
7	(China) Liang Wenchong	3,426,632
8	(India) Anirban Lahiri	3,034,434
9	(Thailand) Prom Meesawat	2,776,891
10	(Thailand) Chapchai Nirat	2,664,047

== See also ==
- Asian Development Tour
- Ladies Asian Golf Tour
- List of golfers with most Asian Tour wins
