= 2005 European Tour =

Golf tour season

2005 European Tour season
- Duration: 25 November 2004 – 30 October 2005
- Number of official events: 47
- Most wins: (South Africa) Ernie Els (3) (Note: Tiger Woods won four events, but was not a European Tour member.)
- Order of Merit: (Scotland) Colin Montgomerie
- Golfer of the Year: (New Zealand) Michael Campbell
- Sir Henry Cotton Rookie of the Year: (Spain) Gonzalo Fernández-Castaño

The 2005 European Tour was the 34th season of the European Tour, the main professional golf tour in Europe since its inaugural season in 1972.

== Changes for 2005 ==
Changes from the 2004 season included five new tournaments: the Volvo China Open and TCL Classic in China, making a total of five events in the country, the Indonesia Open, the New Zealand Open and the Abama Open de Canarias, as the tour retained a stop in the Canary Islands. The ANZ Championship, Open de Sevilla and The Heritage were lost from the schedule.

== Schedule ==
The following table lists official events during the 2005 season.

Date	Tournament	Host country	Purse	Winner (Note: The number in brackets after each winner's name is the number of European Tour events they had won up to and including that tournament. This information is only shown for European Tour members and are inclusive of the three United States-based major championships which were included on the schedule for the first time in 1998, with earlier editions having retrospectively been recognised as official tour wins.)	OWGR points	Other tours (Note: AFR − Sunshine Tour; ANZ − PGA Tour of Australasia; ASA − Asian Tour; CHA − Challenge Tour.)	Notes
28 Nov	Volvo China Open	China	US$1,000,000	(Wales) Stephen Dodd (1)	16	ASA	New to European Tour
5 Dec	Omega Hong Kong Open	Hong Kong	US$800,000	(Spain) Miguel Ángel Jiménez (12)	24	ASA	
12 Dec	Dunhill Championship	South Africa	£500,000	(South Africa) Charl Schwartzel (1)	18	AFR	
23 Jan	South African Airways Open	South Africa	£500,000	(South Africa) Tim Clark (2)	32	AFR (Note: Sunshine Tour flagship event)	
30 Jan	Caltex Masters	Singapore	US$1,000,000	(England) Nick Dougherty (1)	30	ASA	
6 Feb	Heineken Classic	Australia	A$2,000,000	(Australia) Craig Parry (6)	40	ANZ	
13 Feb	Holden New Zealand Open	New Zealand	NZ$1,500,000	(Sweden) Niclas Fasth (2)	24	ANZ	New to European Tour
20 Feb	Carlsberg Malaysian Open	Malaysia	US$1,210,000	(Thailand) Thongchai Jaidee (2)	26	ASA	
27 Feb	WGC-Accenture Match Play Championship	United States	US$7,500,000	(United States) David Toms (n/a)	76		World Golf Championship
6 Mar	Dubai Desert Classic	UAE	US$2,200,000	(South Africa) Ernie Els (19)	36		
13 Mar	Qatar Masters	Qatar	US$1,500,000	(South Africa) Ernie Els (20)	26	ASA	
20 Mar	TCL Classic	China	US$1,000,000	(England) Paul Casey (4)	20	ASA	New to European Tour
27 Mar	Enjoy Jakarta Standard Chartered Indonesia Open	Indonesia	US$1,000,000	(Thailand) Thaworn Wiratchant (1)	16	ASA	New to European Tour
3 Apr	Estoril Open de Portugal	Portugal	€1,250,000	(England) Paul Broadhurst (5)	24		
10 Apr	Madeira Island Open Caixa Geral de Depositos	Portugal	€600,000	(Netherlands) Robert-Jan Derksen (2)	16	CHA	
10 Apr	Masters Tournament	United States	US$7,000,000	(United States) Tiger Woods (n/a)	100		Major championship
17 Apr	Jazztel Open de España en Andalucía	Spain	€1,650,000	(Sweden) Peter Hanson (1)	24		
24 Apr	Johnnie Walker Classic	China	£1,250,000	(Australia) Adam Scott (5)	46	ANZ, ASA	
1 May	BMW Asian Open	China	US$1,500,000	(South Africa) Ernie Els (21)	38	ASA	
8 May	Telecom Italia Open	Italy	€1,300,000	(England) Steve Webster (1)	24		
15 May	Daily Telegraph Dunlop Masters	England	£1,700,000	(Denmark) Thomas Bjørn (8)	36		
22 May	Nissan Irish Open	Ireland	€2,000,000	(Wales) Stephen Dodd (2)	38		
29 May	BMW Championship	England	€4,000,000	(Argentina) Ángel Cabrera (3)	64		Flagship event
5 Jun	Celtic Manor Wales Open	Wales	£1,500,000	(Spain) Miguel Ángel Jiménez (13)	26		
12 Jun	KLM Open	Netherlands	€1,500,000	(Spain) Gonzalo Fernández-Castaño (1)	24		
19 Jun	Aa St Omer Open	France	€400,000	(Sweden) Joakim Bäckström (1)	16	CHA	
19 Jun	U.S. Open	United States	US$6,250,000	(New Zealand) Michael Campbell (7)	100		Major championship
26 Jun	Open de France	France	€3,500,000	(France) Jean-François Remésy (3)	24		
3 Jul	Smurfit European Open	Ireland	£2,400,000	(England) Kenneth Ferrie (2)	46		
10 Jul	Barclays Scottish Open	Scotland	£2,400,000	(South Africa) Tim Clark (3)	50		
17 Jul	The Open Championship	Scotland	£4,000,000	(United States) Tiger Woods (n/a)	100		Major championship
24 Jul	Deutsche Bank Players Championship of Europe	Germany	€3,300,000	(Sweden) Niclas Fasth (3)	44		
31 Jul	Scandinavian Masters	Sweden	€1,600,000	(Australia) Mark Hensby (1)	24		
7 Aug	Johnnie Walker Championship at Gleneagles	Scotland	£1,400,000	(Italy) Emanuele Canonica (1)	24		
14 Aug	Cadillac Russian Open	Russia	US$500,000	(Sweden) Mikael Lundberg (1)	16	CHA	
15 Aug	PGA Championship	United States	US$6,500,000	(United States) Phil Mickelson (n/a)	100		Major championship
21 Aug	WGC-NEC Invitational	United States	US$7,500,000	(United States) Tiger Woods (n/a)	74		World Golf Championship
28 Aug	BMW International Open	Germany	€2,000,000	(England) David Howell (2)	36		
4 Sep	Omega European Masters	Switzerland	€1,700,000	(Spain) Sergio García (6)	24		
11 Sep	Linde German Masters	Germany	€3,000,000	(South Africa) Retief Goosen (12)	46		
18 Sep	HSBC World Match Play Championship	England	£1,660,000	(New Zealand) Michael Campbell (8)	36		Limited-field event
2 Oct	Dunhill Links Championship	Scotland	US$5,000,000	(Scotland) Colin Montgomerie (29)	38		Pro-Am
9 Oct	Abama Open de Canarias	Spain	€450,000	(England) John Bickerton (1)	16	CHA	New tournament
9 Oct	WGC-American Express Championship	United States	US$7,500,000	(United States) Tiger Woods (n/a)	72		World Golf Championship
16 Oct	Open de Madrid	Spain	€1,000,000	(France) Raphaël Jacquelin (1)	24		
23 Oct	Mallorca Classic	Spain	€1,500,000	(Spain) José María Olazábal (23)	24		
30 Oct	Volvo Masters	Spain	€4,000,000	(Republic of Ireland) Paul McGinley (4)	46		Tour Championship

=== Unofficial events ===
The following events were sanctioned by the European Tour, but did not carry official money, nor were wins official.

Date	Tournament	Host country	Purse	Winner(s)	OWGR points	Notes
5 Jul	J. P. McManus Pro-Am	Ireland	n/a	(Republic of Ireland) Pádraig Harrington	n/a	Pro-Am
25 Sep	Seve Trophy	England	€2,000,000	Team GB&I	n/a	Team event
20 Nov	WGC-World Cup	Portugal	US$4,000,000	(Wales) Stephen Dodd and (Wales) Bradley Dredge	n/a	World Golf Championship; Team event

== Order of Merit ==
The Order of Merit was based on prize money won during the season, calculated in Euros.

Position	Player	Prize money (€)
1	(Scotland) Colin Montgomerie	2,794,223
2	(New Zealand) Michael Campbell	2,496,269
3	(Republic of Ireland) Paul McGinley	2,296,423
4	(South Africa) Retief Goosen	2,261,211
5	(Argentina) Ángel Cabrera	1,866,277
6	(Spain) Sergio García	1,828,545
7	(England) David Howell	1,798,308
8	(Sweden) Henrik Stenson	1,585,750
9	(Denmark) Thomas Bjørn	1,561,190
10	(Spain) José María Olazábal	1,489,016

== Awards ==
Award	Winner	Ref.
Golfer of the Year	(New Zealand) Michael Campbell	
Sir Henry Cotton Rookie of the Year	(Spain) Gonzalo Fernández-Castaño	

== See also ==
- 2005 in golf
- 2005 European Seniors Tour
