= 2000 WGC-American Express Championship =

Coordinates: 36°17′09″N 5°20′02″W

Tournament information
- Dates: 9–12 November 2000
- Location: Sotogrande, San Roque, Spain
- Course(s): Valderrama Golf Club
- Tour(s): PGA Tour; European Tour

Statistics
- Par: 72
- Length: 6,974
- Field: 55 players
- Cut: None
- Prize fund: $5,000,000
- Winner's share: $1,000,000

Champion
- (Canada) Mike Weir
- 277 (−11)

The 2000 WGC-American Express Championship was a golf tournament that was contested from 9–12 November 2000 at Valderrama Golf Club in Sotogrande, San Roque, Spain. It was the second WGC-American Express Championship tournament, and the third of four World Golf Championships events that year.

Mike Weir won the tournament after he birdied five of his first 11 holes on Sunday.

== Field ==
1. Top 50 from the Official World Golf Ranking as of 30 October

Robert Allenby (2), Stuart Appleby (2), Thomas Bjørn (3), Michael Campbell (3,4), Darren Clarke (3), José Cóceres (3), Ernie Els (2,3), Steve Flesch (2), Carlos Franco (2), Sergio García, Retief Goosen (3), Pádraig Harrington (3), Dudley Hart, Scott Hoch, Miguel Ángel Jiménez (3), Bernhard Langer (3), Justin Leonard (2), Jeff Maggert, Shigeki Maruyama, Bob May (2), Rocco Mediate, Colin Montgomerie (3), José María Olazábal (3), Naomichi Ozaki, Jesper Parnevik (2), Dennis Paulson, Chris Perry (2), Nick Price (2), Eduardo Romero (3), Vijay Singh (2), David Toms (2), Kirk Triplett (2), Scott Verplank (2), Duffy Waldorf, Mike Weir (2), Lee Westwood (3), Tiger Woods (2)

- Paul Azinger (2), Notah Begay III (2), Stewart Cink (2), Fred Couples, David Duval (2), Jim Furyk (2), John Huston (2), Tom Lehman (2), Davis Love III (2), Phil Mickelson (2), Greg Norman, Loren Roberts (2), and Hal Sutton (2) did not play.

2. Top 30 on the 2000 PGA Tour money list through the National Car Rental Golf Classic Disney

Mark Calcavecchia, Chris DiMarco, Franklin Langham

3. Top 20 on the 2000 European Tour Order of Merit through the Volvo Masters

Ángel Cabrera, Andrew Coltart, Pierre Fulke, Mathias Grönberg, Paul McGinley, Gary Orr, Phillip Price

4. Top 3 on the 1999–2000 PGA Tour of Australasia Order of Merit

Lucas Parsons, Peter Senior

5. Top 3 on the 1999–2000 Southern Africa Tour Order of Merit

Darren Fichardt, Nic Henning, Tjaart van der Walt

6. Top 3 on the 2000 Japan Golf Tour Order of Merit through the Philip Morris Championship

Nobuhito Sato, Hidemichi Tanaka

- Toru Taniguchi did not play.

5. Winner of the 1999 Asian PGA Tour Order of Merit

Kyi Hla Han

== Round summaries ==
=== First round ===
Place	Player	Score	To par
1	(Zimbabwe) Nick Price	63	−9
2	(Republic of Ireland) Pádraig Harrington	66	−6
T3	(Scotland) Andrew Coltart	67	−5
T3	(United States) Scott Hoch	67	−5
T5	(United States) Franklin Langham	68	−4
T5	(United States) Chris Perry	68	−4
T5	(Canada) Mike Weir	68	−4
T8	(Australia) Robert Allenby	69	−3
T8	(Paraguay) Carlos Franco	69	−3
T8	(Spain) Sergio García	69	−3
T8	(South Africa) Retief Goosen	69	−3
T8	(South Africa) Nic Henning	69	−3

=== Second round ===
Place	Player	Score	To par
1	(Zimbabwe) Nick Price	63-72=135	−9
2	(Japan) Hidemichi Tanaka	71-66=137	−7
3	(Republic of Ireland) Pádraig Harrington	66-72=138	−6
T4	(United States) Mark Calcavecchia	72-67=139	−5
T4	(United States) Duffy Waldorf	70-69=139	−5
T6	(United States) Bob May	71-69=140	−4
T6	(United States) Chris Perry	68-72=140	−4
T6	(United States) Tiger Woods	71-69=140	−4
T9	(Argentina) José Cóceres	70-71=141	−3
T9	(Fiji) Vijay Singh	71-70=141	−3

=== Third round ===
Place	Player	Score	To par
1	(Japan) Hidemichi Tanaka	71-66-70=207	−9
T2	(United States) Mark Calcavecchia	72-67-69=208	−8
T2	(Canada) Mike Weir	68-75-65=208	−8
T4	(Zimbabwe) Nick Price	63-72-74=209	−7
T4	(United States) Tiger Woods	71-69-69=209	−7
T6	(Republic of Ireland) Pádraig Harrington	66-72-73=211	−5
T6	(United States) Duffy Waldorf	70-69-72=211	−5
T8	(New Zealand) Michael Campbell	72-71-69=212	−4
T8	(United States) Bob May	71-69-72=212	−4
T8	(Fiji) Vijay Singh	71-70-71=212	−4
T8	(England) Lee Westwood	72-72-68=212	−4

=== Final round ===
Place	Player	Score	To par	Money ($)
1	(Canada) Mike Weir	68-75-65-69=277	−11	1,000,000
2	(England) Lee Westwood	72-72-68-67=279	−9	500,000
T3	(Fiji) Vijay Singh	71-70-71-68=280	−8	287,000
T3	(United States) Duffy Waldorf	70-69-72-69=280	−8	287,000
T5	(Spain) Sergio García	69-74-74-64=281	−7	157,500
T5	(Republic of Ireland) Pádraig Harrington	66-72-73-70=281	−7	157,500
T5	(Zimbabwe) Nick Price	63-72-74-72=281	−7	157,500
T5	(United States) Tiger Woods	71-69-69-72=281	−7	157,500
9	(New Zealand) Michael Campbell	72-71-69-70=282	−6	115,000
10	(United States) Mark Calcavecchia	72-67-69-75=283	−5	105,000
