= Open de Canarias =

Open de Canarias may refer to:

- Turespana Open De Canaria, originally called the Tenerife Open, played between 1989 and 1995
- Abama Open de Canarias, played on just one occasion in 2005, also a Challenge Tour event
- Turespana Masters, Turespana Masters Open de Canarias, the 1997 edition of the Turespana Masters
- Open de España, the 2002 to 2004 Spanish Opens
