= Michael Campbell =

New Zealand golfer (born 1969)

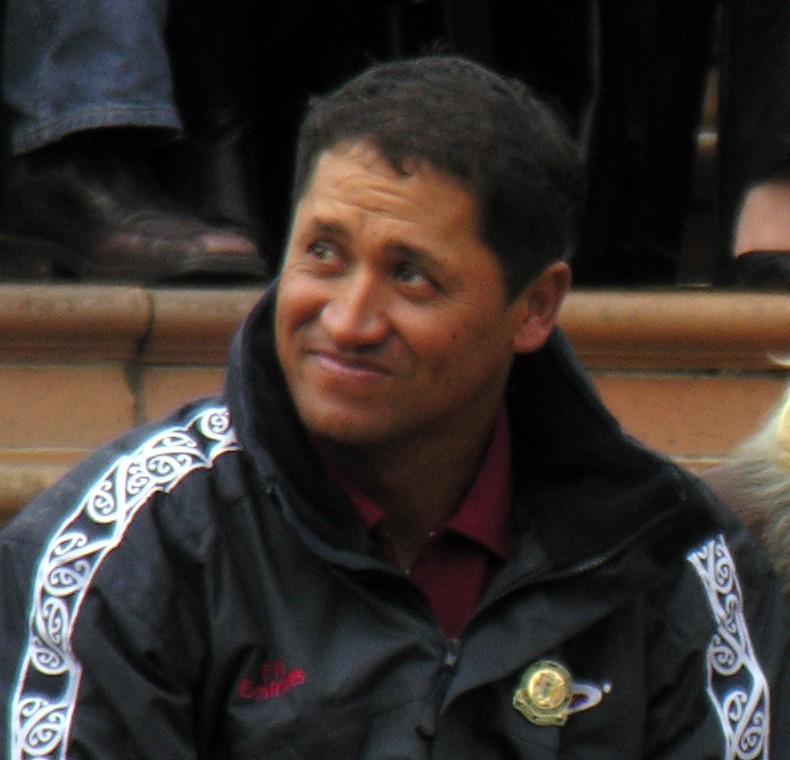

Personal information
- Full name: Michael Shane Campbell
- Nickname: Cambo
- Nationality: New Zealand
- Born: 23 February 1969 (age 57) Hāwera, New Zealand
- Height: 5 ft 10 in (1.78 m)
- Weight: 190 lb (86 kg; 14 st)
- Children: 2

Career
- Sport: Golf
- Turned professional: 1993
- Current tour: European Senior Tour
- Former tours: PGA Tour of Australasia; European Tour; PGA Tour
- Professional wins: 15
- Highest ranking: 12 (27 May 2001)

Number of wins by tour
- PGA Tour: 1
- European Tour: 8
- Asian Tour: 1
- PGA Tour of Australasia: 7
- Challenge Tour: 3

Best results in major championships (wins: 1)
- Masters Tournament: CUT: 1996, 2001, 2002, 2003, 2004, 2006, 2007, 2008, 2009, 2010
- PGA Championship: T6: 2005
- U.S. Open: Won: 2005
- The Open Championship: T3: 1995

Achievements and awards
- PGA Tour of Australasia Rookie of the Year: 1993
- PGA Tour of Australasia Order of Merit: 1999–2000
- PGA Tour of Australasia Player of the Year: 1999–2000
- European Tour Golfer of the Year: 2005

Michael Shane Campbell CNZM (born 23 February 1969) is a New Zealand professional golfer who is best known for having won the 2005 U.S. Open and, at the time, the richest prize in golf, the £1,000,000 HSBC World Match Play Championship, in the same year. He played on the European Tour and the PGA Tour of Australasia.

== Early life and amateur career ==
Campbell was born in Hāwera, Taranaki. Ethnically, he is predominantly Māori, from the Ngāti Ruanui (father's side) and Ngā Rauru (mother's side) iwi. He also has some Scottish ancestry, being a great-great-great-grandson of John Logan Campbell, a Scottish emigrant to New Zealand. As a young child, he lived near his mother's Wai-o-Turi marae at Whenuakura, just south of Pātea, and also spent much of his time with whānau at his father's Taiporohenui marae, near Hāwera.

Like many young New Zealand boys, Campbell dreamed of playing for the All Blacks, and began playing rugby union, but his mother vetoed his participation. While he was talented at several other sports, such as softball, squash and table tennis, his passion turned out to be golf.

Aged seven, he began playing golf on the Pātea golf course, which had the greens fenced to keep sheep off them. He was introduced to the game by an uncle, Roger Rei, but was also undoubtedly influenced by his father, Tom Campbell, who was a single-figure handicapper. The family moved south to Tītahi Bay, where Campbell joined the Titahi Bay golf club aged 10. He developed his skills in junior ranks at nearby Paraparaumu and attended school at Mana College but left without any qualifications.

From 1988, Campbell represented New Zealand in various international amateur competitions, including the team victory at the 1992 Eisenhower Trophy.

== Professional career ==
In 1993, he turned professional. In 1995, in his first full season on the European Tour, he held a two-shot lead after the third round of The Open Championship, but faded after a final-round 76. He nonetheless remained in contention until the final hole, missing a playoff with Costantino Rocca and John Daly (eventually won by Daly) by one stroke. At the end of 1995 Campbell had moved to 28th in the Official World Golf Ranking.

Within three years after his third-place-finish in The Open Championship, Campbell fell into a slump and went down to 465th in World Ranking.

Campbell eventually established himself as a solid tour performer, finishing fourth on the European Tour Order of Merit (money list) in 2000, and again finishing in the top ten of the Order of Merit in 2002. He won the PGA Tour of Australasia's Order of Merit during the 1999/2000 season.

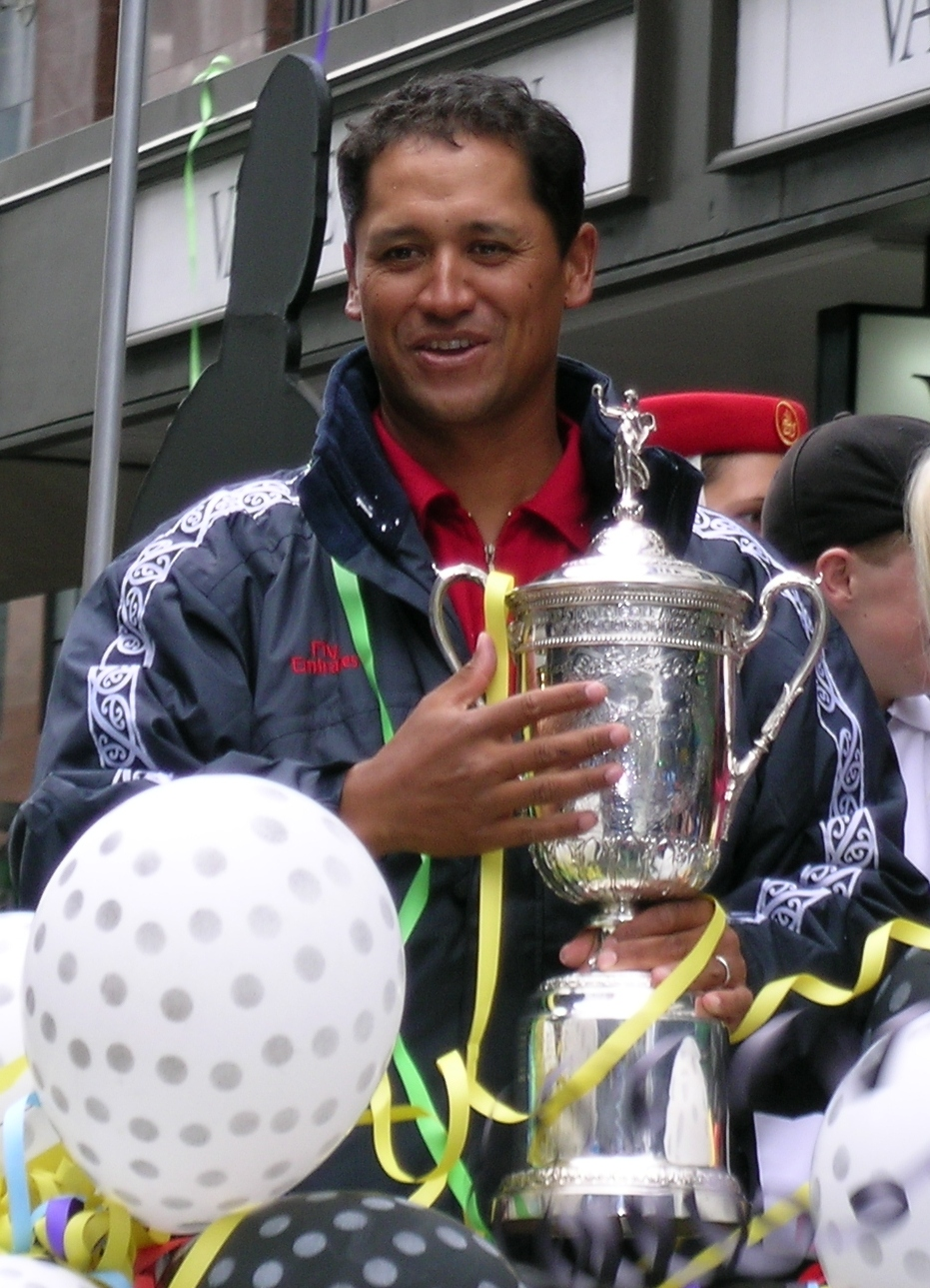
Michael Campbell holding U.S. Open Trophy

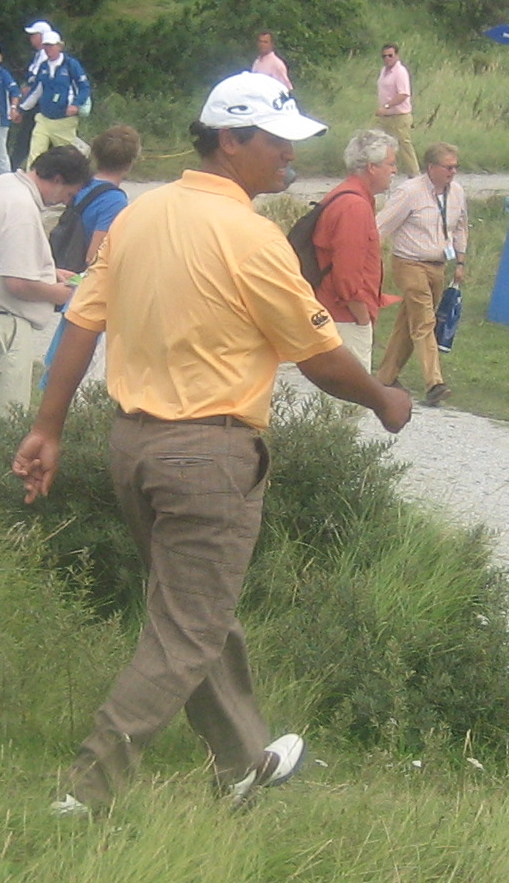
Michael Campbell walks to the 12th tee at the 2007 KLM Open.

Campbell failed to make the cut in his first five 2005 tournaments. He made a quick turnaround and missed only one cut in the next 16 tournaments. He finished in the top six of both the Open Championship and PGA Championship, and recorded top-five placings in three other tournaments.

=== 2005 U.S. Open ===
Campbell qualified for the U.S. Open through sectional qualifying. The USGA introduced European qualifying for the first time, which took place at Walton Heath. He had to sink an 8-foot birdie putt on the last hole of qualifying to secure his place in the U.S. Open.

In the tournament itself, Campbell ended the third round four strokes behind Retief Goosen, the event's defending champion. On the final day, Goosen ballooned to an 81. Campbell shot 69 (1 under par) for the final round and was the only golfer in the last two pairings of the day to break 80. Campbell's main competition turned out to be Tiger Woods, who at one point closed to within one shot of Campbell.

In the end, Woods was undone by bogeys on the 16th and 17th holes, and Campbell won his first major by two shots, carding an even par of 280. With his win, he became only the second New Zealander to win a major (after Bob Charles), and also the first winner of the U.S. Open since Steve Jones in 1996 who had entered the event via sectional qualifying.

Two months later, in August, Campbell finished in a tie for 6th in the PGA Championship at Baltusrol, won by Phil Mickelson.

=== World Match Play champion ===
In September 2005, Campbell won the HSBC World Match Play Championship at Wentworth. He defeated Australian Geoff Ogilvy (1-up) before being taken to the 37th hole by another Australian, Steve Elkington, in the quarter-final.

In the semi-final he faced Retief Goosen who the previous day had recorded a 12 and 11 win over Mark Hensby. Campbell defeated Goosen 7 and 6 and the next day beat Irishman Paul McGinley 2 and 1 in the final to take the championship and win the £1,000,000 richest prize in golf. He became only the fourth golfer to win the U.S. Open and the World Match Play titles in the same year, joining Gary Player, Hale Irwin and Ernie Els, and the win moved him to the top of the European Order of Merit, ahead of Goosen. He finished the year ranked second on the Order of Merit.

=== Later career, retirement and comeback ===
Campbell had no top-10 finishes on the European Tour between 2009 and September 2012, although his U.S. Open win meant he retained his playing rights. In October 2012, he finished third in the Portugal Masters, and in December he finished 8th in the Hong Kong Open (both European tour events). He retired from golf in 2015, citing an ankle injury and personal issues.

In December 2017, Campbell revealed in an interview with bunkered magazine that he was planning to make a European Tour comeback in 2018 with a view to playing on the Staysure Tour and PGA Tour Champions when he turns 50 in February 2019. He is automatically qualified for the U.S. Senior Open from 2019 until 2028 as all former U.S. Open champions are exempt from qualifying for ten years. He was unable to play in the New Zealand Open as planned, having aggravated an old injury to a tendon in his left ankle during training.

Campbell is a co-founder of the Project Litefoot Trust, which is helping New Zealand community sports clubs reduce their environmental impact, while saving money for sport.

== Personal life ==
Campbell's wife, Julie, and two sons primarily reside in Sydney, Australia, which is Julie's hometown. In 2012 he moved first to Switzerland and then to southern Spain, where he opened a golf academy and has been the brand ambassador for a golf resort.

Among his many New Zealand television appearances in 2008 was a cameo role in an episode of sports skit comedy show Pulp Sport.

== Awards and honors ==
- In the 2001 Queen's Birthday Honours, Campbell was appointed an Officer of the New Zealand Order of Merit, for services to golf.
- On 29 October 2005, Campbell was awarded Honorary Life Membership of The European Tour for his U.S. Open win.
- In the 2006 New Year Honours, Campbell was appointed a Companion of the New Zealand Order of Merit, for services to golf.

== Amateur wins ==
- 1992 Australian Amateur, New South Wales Amateur

== Professional wins (15) ==
=== PGA Tour wins (1) ===
Legend
Major championships (1)
Other PGA Tour (0)

No.	Date	Tournament	Winning score	Margin of victory	Runner-up
1	19 Jun 2005	U.S. Open	E (71-69-71-69=280)	2 strokes	(United States) Tiger Woods

=== European Tour wins (8) ===
Legend
Major championships (1)
Other European Tour (7)

No.	Date	Tournament	Winning score	Margin of victory	Runner(s)-up
1	14 Nov 1999 (2000 season)	Johnnie Walker Classic^{1,2}	−12 (66-71-69-70=276)	1 stroke	(Australia) Geoff Ogilvy
2	30 Jan 2000	Heineken Classic^{1}	−20 (68-69-65-66=268)	6 strokes	(Denmark) Thomas Bjørn
3	1 Oct 2000	Linde German Masters	−19 (68-64-65=197) (Note: Shortened to 54 holes due to weather.)	1 stroke	(Argentina) José Cóceres
4	4 Feb 2001	Heineken Classic^{1} (2)	−18 (69-70-67-64=270)	5 strokes	(New Zealand) David Smail
5	7 Jul 2002	Smurfit European Open	−6 (68-71-70-73=282)	1 stroke	(Wales) Bradley Dredge, (South Africa) Retief Goosen, (Republic of Ireland) Pádraig Harrington, (Scotland) Paul Lawrie
6	27 Jul 2003	Nissan Irish Open	−11 (66-69-71-71=277)	Playoff	(Denmark) Thomas Bjørn, (Sweden) Peter Hedblom
7	19 Jun 2005	U.S. Open	E (71-69-71-69=280)	2 strokes	(United States) Tiger Woods
8	18 Sep 2005	HSBC World Match Play Championship	2 and 1		(Republic of Ireland) Paul McGinley

^{1}Co-sanctioned by the PGA Tour of Australasia
^{2}Co-sanctioned by the Asian PGA Tour

European Tour playoff record (1–0)

No.	Year	Tournament	Opponents	Result
1	2003	Nissan Irish Open	(Denmark) Thomas Bjørn, (Sweden) Peter Hedblom	Won with birdie on first extra hole

=== Asian PGA Tour wins (1) ===
No.	Date	Tournament	Winning score	Margin of victory	Runner-up
1	14 Nov 1999	Johnnie Walker Classic^{1}	−12 (66-71-69-70=276)	1 stroke	(Australia) Geoff Ogilvy

^{1}Co-sanctioned by the European Tour and the PGA Tour of Australasia

=== PGA Tour of Australasia wins (7) ===
No.	Date	Tournament	Winning score	Margin of victory	Runner(s)-up
1	28 Feb 1993	Canon Challenge	−16 (70-65-65-72=272)	3 strokes	(Australia) Steven Conran
2	5 Nov 1995	Alfred Dunhill Masters	−21 (69-65-68-65=267)	5 strokes	(Wales) Mark Mouland, (Australia) Craig Parry
3	14 Nov 1999	Johnnie Walker Classic^{1,2}	−12 (66-71-69-70=276)	1 stroke	(Australia) Geoff Ogilvy
4	23 Jan 2000	Crown Lager New Zealand Open	−15 (69-67-69-64=269)	Playoff	(New Zealand) Craig Perks
5	30 Jan 2000	Heineken Classic^{1}	−20 (68-69-65-66=268)	6 strokes	(Denmark) Thomas Bjørn
6	13 Feb 2000	Ericsson Masters	−10 (75-67-67-73=282)	4 strokes	(Australia) Brett Rumford
7	4 Feb 2001	Heineken Classic^{1} (2)	−18 (69-70-67-64=270)	5 strokes	(New Zealand) David Smail

^{1}Co-sanctioned by the European Tour
^{2}Co-sanctioned by the Asian PGA Tour

PGA Tour of Australasia playoff record (1–0)

No.	Year	Tournament	Opponent	Result
1	2000	Crown Lager New Zealand Open	(New Zealand) Craig Perks	Won with eagle on second extra hole

=== Challenge Tour wins (3) ===
No.	Date	Tournament	Winning score	Margin of victory	Runner-up
1	26 Jun 1994	Memorial Olivier Barras	−10 (67-67-72=206)	3 strokes	(Northern Ireland) Raymond Burns
2	3 Jul 1994	Bank Austria Open	−12 (71-68-68-69=276)	2 strokes	(England) Stuart Cage
3	14 Aug 1994	Audi Quattro Trophy	−21 (67-67-66-67=267)	2 strokes	(Northern Ireland) Raymond Burns

== Playoff record ==
Other playoff record (0–1)

No.	Year	Tournament	Opponents	Result
1	2001	WGC-World Cup (with (New Zealand) David Smail)	Denmark − Thomas Bjørn and Søren Hansen, South Africa − Retief Goosen and Ernie Els, United States − David Duval and Tiger Woods	South Africa won with par on second extra hole New Zealand and United States eliminated by birdie on first hole

== Major championships ==
=== Wins (1) ===
Year	Championship	54 holes	Winning score	Margin	Runner-up
2005	U.S. Open	4 shot deficit	E (71-69-71-69=280)	2 strokes	(United States) Tiger Woods

=== Results timeline ===
Tournament	1994	1995	1996	1997	1998	1999
Masters Tournament			CUT			
U.S. Open			T32			
The Open Championship	CUT	T3	DQ		T66	CUT
PGA Championship		T17	CUT			

Tournament	2000	2001	2002	2003	2004	2005	2006	2007	2008	2009
Masters Tournament		CUT	CUT	CUT	CUT		CUT	CUT	CUT	CUT
U.S. Open	T12	CUT	CUT	CUT	CUT	1	CUT	T58	CUT	CUT
The Open Championship	CUT	T23	CUT	T53	T20	T5	T35	T57	T51	WD
PGA Championship	CUT	CUT	T23	T69	T49	T6	CUT	CUT	T42	CUT

Tournament	2010	2011	2012	2013
Masters Tournament	CUT			
U.S. Open	CUT	CUT	CUT	CUT
The Open Championship				
PGA Championship				

Win
Top 10
Did not play

DQ = Disqualified
WD = Withdrew
CUT = missed the half-way cut
"T" indicates a tie for a place

=== Summary ===
Tournament	Wins	2nd	3rd	Top-5	Top-10	Top-25	Events	Cuts made
Masters Tournament	0	0	0	0	0	0	10	0
U.S. Open	1	0	0	1	1	2	15	4
The Open Championship	0	0	1	2	2	4	15	9
PGA Championship	0	0	0	0	1	3	12	6
Totals	1	0	1	3	4	9	52	19

- Most consecutive cuts made – 5 (2004 Open Championship – 2005 PGA)
- Longest streak of top-10s – 3 (2005 U.S. Open – 2005 PGA)

== Results in The Players Championship ==
Tournament	1996	1997	1998	1999
The Players Championship	T71			

Tournament	2000	2001	2002	2003	2004	2005	2006	2007	2008	2009
The Players Championship		T15	T11	DQ			CUT	CUT	CUT	WD

Did not play

CUT = missed the halfway cut
WD = withdrew
DQ = disqualified
"T" indicates a tie for a place

== Results in World Golf Championships ==
Tournament	2000	2001	2002	2003	2004	2005	2006	2007
Match Play	R64	R16	R64	R64	R64		R64	R64
Championship	9	NT^{1}	T9	T68	66	T46	T22	71
Invitational	T15	T31	T11	T71		68	17	T46

^{1}Cancelled due to 9/11

Top 10
Did not play

QF, R16, R32, R64 = Round in which player lost in match play
"T" = tied
NT = No tournament

== Team appearances ==
Amateur

- Nomura Cup (representing New Zealand): 1991
- Eisenhower Trophy (representing New Zealand): 1992 (winners)
- Sloan Morpeth Trophy (representing New Zealand): 1992 (winners)

Professional

- Alfred Dunhill Cup (representing New Zealand): 1995, 1999, 2000
- World Cup (representing New Zealand): 1995, 2001, 2002, 2003
- Presidents Cup (International Team): 2000, 2005
- Alfred Dunhill Challenge (representing Australasia): 1995

== See also ==
- List of golfers with most European Tour wins

== Notes ==
Awards
Preceded by Hamish Carter	New Zealand's Sportsman of the Year; 2005	Succeeded by Mahé Drysdale
Preceded by Sarah Ulmer	Halberg Awards – Supreme Award; 2005	Succeeded by Mahé Drysdale
