= Austin Eaton III =

American golfer

Austin Eaton III (born June 19, 1969; Lakeville, Minnesota) is an American amateur golfer who won the 2004 U.S. Mid-Amateur Golf Championship. His win gave him entry to the 2005 Masters Tournament.
