= Montecastillo Golf Club =

Golf resort in Jerez de la Frontera, Spain

- Interactive map of Montecastillo Golf Club

Club information
- Location: Jerez, Cádiz, Spain
- Type: Private
- Tournaments: Volvo Masters

Montecastillo Golf Club (Spanish: Campo de golf de Montecastillo) is a golf resort located in Jerez de la Frontera in Andalusia, Spain. The club is located outside the town, next to the Jerez speedway.

It is located in a luxury resort, including SPA and "Five star International Sport Resort", where many top-level teams have made stages (like the Spain national football team, Real Madrid, Barcelona or Manchester United

The link hosted the Volvo Masters of Golf from 1997 to 2001, taking over from the traditional host course at the Valderrama Golf Club.

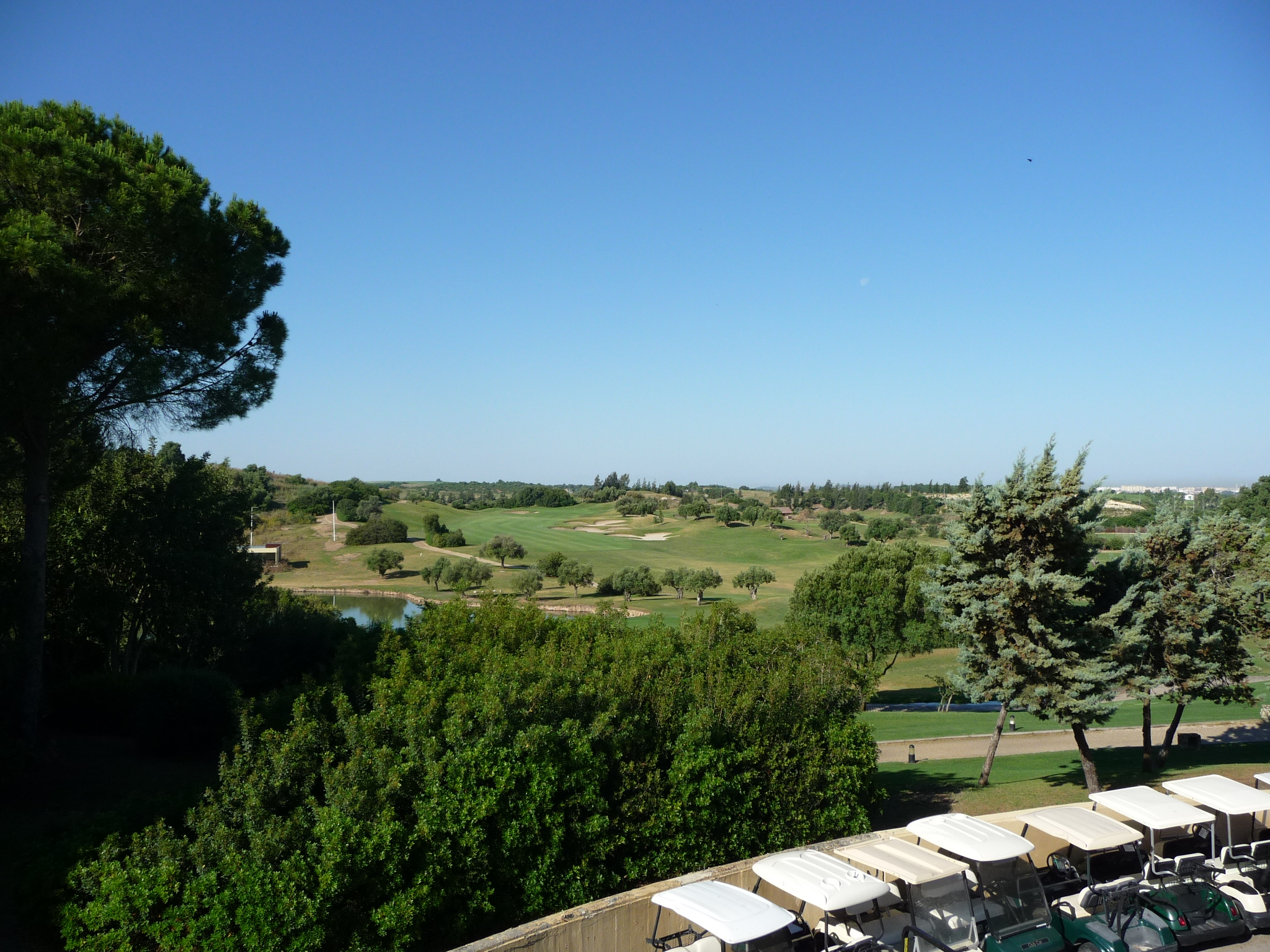
View of the course

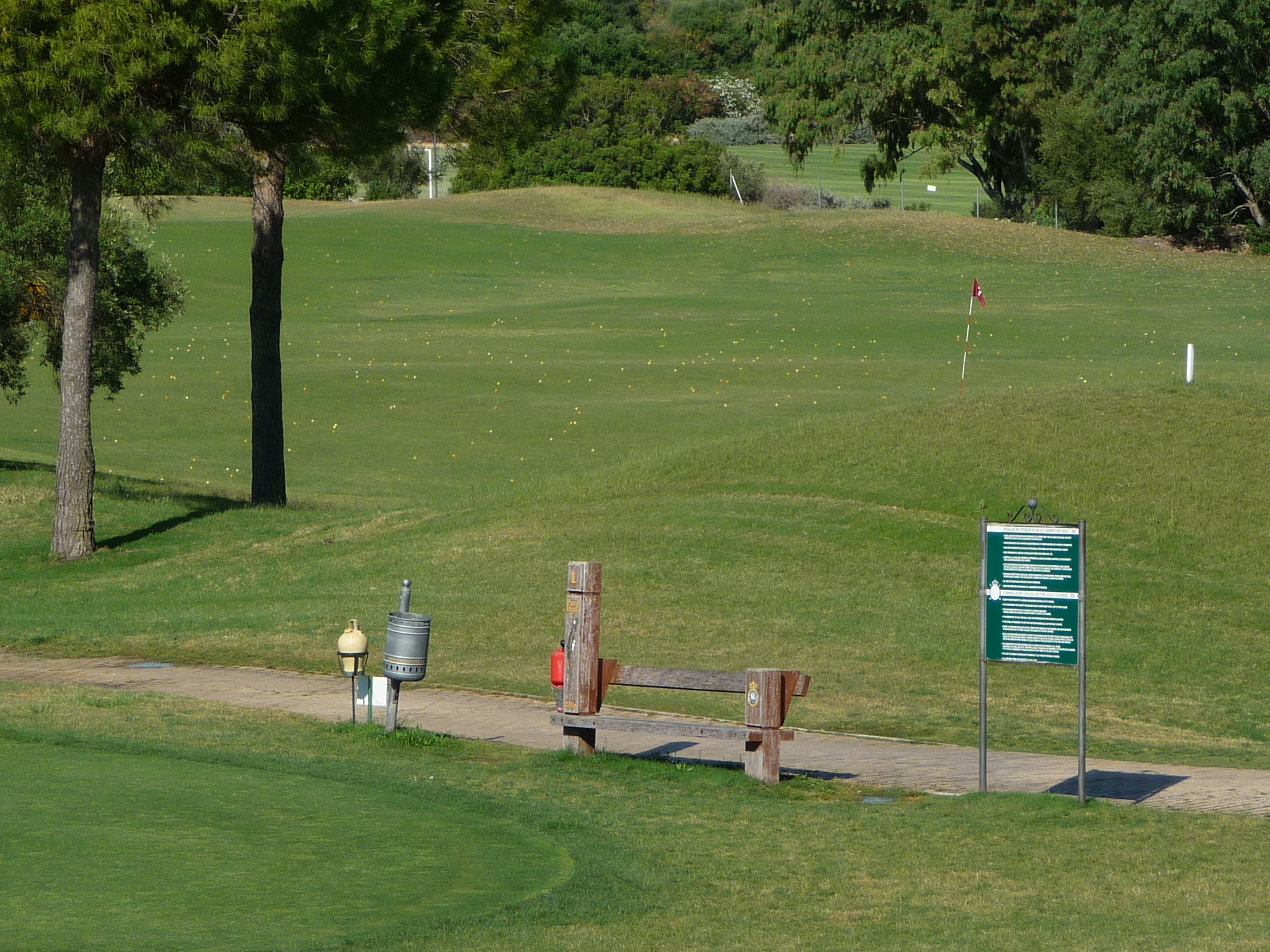
Resting area
