= Cawder Challenge =

Golf tournament in Scotland

Gore-Tex Challenge
Tournament information
- Location: Dundee, Scotland
- Established: 1991
- Course: Letham Grange Golf Club
- Par: 72
- Tour: Challenge Tour
- Format: Stroke play
- Prize fund: £35,000
- Month played: August
- Final year: 1994

Tournament record score
- Aggregate: 271 Charles Raulerson (1993)
- To par: −17 as above

Final champion
- (England) John Bickerton

Location map
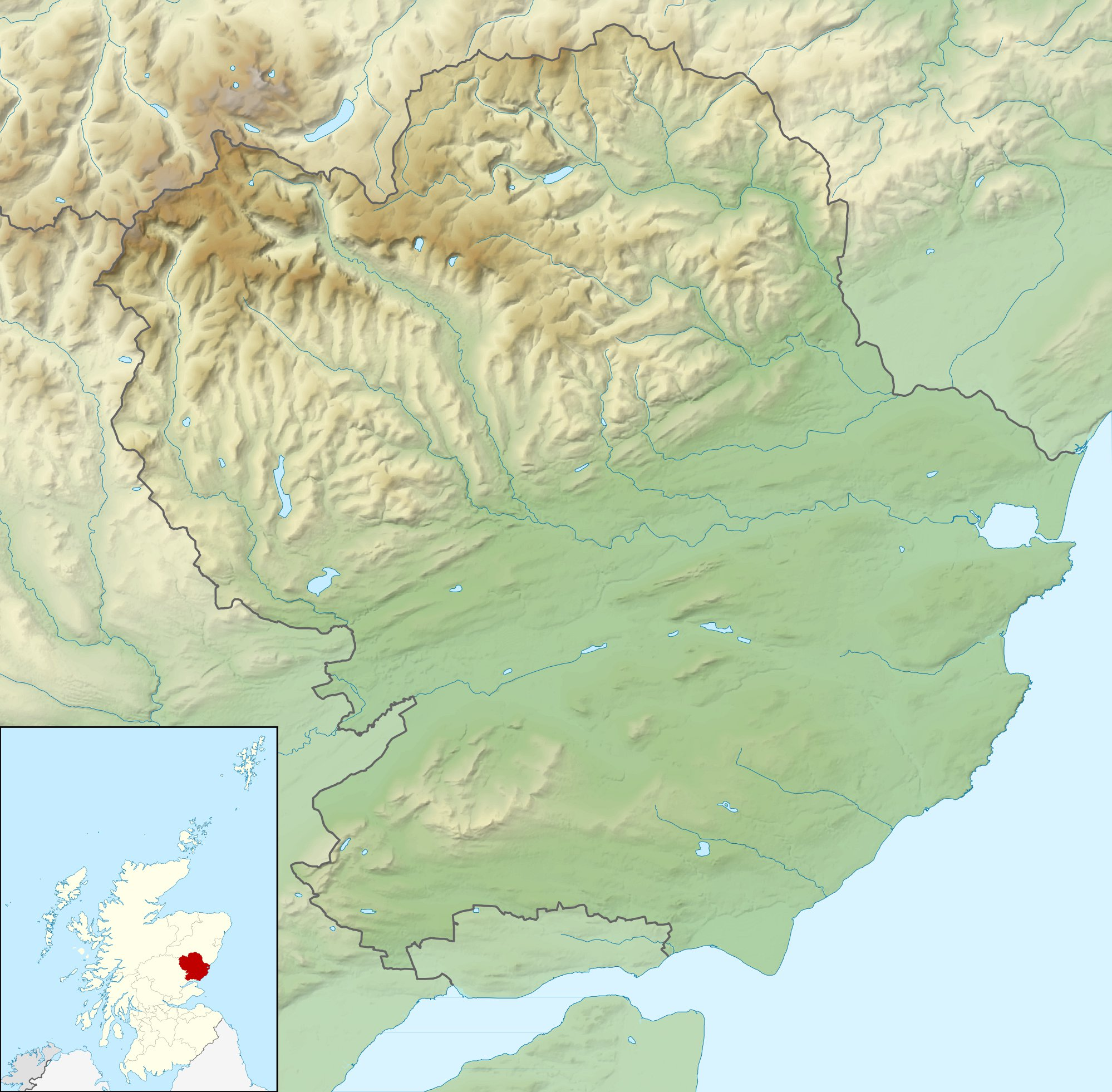
- Location in Scotland Location in Angus

The Cawder Challenge was a golf tournament on the Challenge Tour.

The event was played in Scotland annually 1991–1994. After a break, it was succeeded by the Scottish Challenge in 2006.

== Winners ==
Year	Winner	Score	To par	Margin of victory	Runner-up	Venue	Ref.
Gore-Tex Challenge
1994	(England) John Bickerton	280	−12	Playoff	(Scotland) Lee Vannet	Letham Grange	
1993	(United States) Charles Raulerson	271	−17	1 stroke	(England) Liam White	Cawder	
Gore-Tex Fabrics Challenge
1992	(United States) Brian Nelson	281	−7	1 stroke	(Scotland) Craig Maltman	Cawder	
Cawder Challenge
1991	(Wales) Neil Roderick	274	−14	2 strokes	(Scotland) Colin Gillies	Cawder	
