= 2005 Masters Tournament =

American golf tournament held in 2005

- Front cover of the 2005 Masters Journal

Tournament information
- Dates: April 7–10, 2005
- Location: Augusta, Georgia; 33.503°N 82.020°W
- Course: Augusta National Golf Club
- Organized by: Augusta National Golf Club
- Tours: PGA Tour; European Tour; Japan Golf Tour

Statistics
- Par: 72
- Length: 7,290 yards (6,666 m)
- Field: 93 players, 50 after cut
- Cut: 148 (+4)
- Prize fund: US$7,000,000
- Winner's share: $1,260,000

Champion
- (United States) Tiger Woods
- 276 (−12), playoff
- Location in the United States Location in Georgia

The 2005 Masters Tournament was the 69th Masters Tournament, played from April 7–10 at Augusta National Golf Club in Augusta, Georgia.

Tiger Woods, 29, won his fourth green jacket on the first hole of a playoff with Chris DiMarco. Rain was a factor the whole week, and delayed much of the play. The purse was $7.0 million with a winner's share of $1.26 million. It was the ninth of Woods' fifteen major championships.

This Masters was the last as competitors for three former champions: Tommy Aaron (1973), Billy Casper (1970), and six-time winner Jack Nicklaus.

Ryan Moore was low amateur at 287 (−1), the best score by an amateur since 1978, and earned an exemption to the 2006 tournament.

Jerry Pate, a non-playing invitee, won the 46th Par-3 contest on Wednesday with a five-under 22.

== Course ==
| Hole | Name | Yards | Par | Hole | Name | Yards | Par |
|---|---|---|---|---|---|---|---|
| 1 | Tea Olive | 435 | 4 | 10 | Camellia | 495 | 4 |
| 2 | Pink Dogwood | 575 | 5 | 11 | White Dogwood | 490 | 4 |
| 3 | Flowering Peach | 350 | 4 | 12 | Golden Bell | 155 | 3 |
| 4 | Flowering Crab Apple | 205 | 3 | 13 | Azalea | 510 | 5 |
| 5 | Magnolia | 455 | 4 | 14 | Chinese Fir | 440 | 4 |
| 6 | Juniper | 180 | 3 | 15 | Firethorn | 500 | 5 |
| 7 | Pampas | 410 | 4 | 16 | Redbud | 170 | 3 |
| 8 | Yellow Jasmine | 570 | 5 | 17 | Nandina | 425 | 4 |
| 9 | Carolina Cherry | 460 | 4 | 18 | Holly | 465 | 4 |
| Out | | 3,640 | 36 | In | | 3,650 | 36 |
| Source: | | | | Total | | 7,290 | 72 |

== Field ==
1. Masters champions
Tommy Aaron, Billy Casper, Charles Coody, Fred Couples (10,16,17), Ben Crenshaw, Nick Faldo, Raymond Floyd, Bernhard Langer (10), Sandy Lyle, Phil Mickelson (10,11,12,14,15,16,17), Larry Mize, Jack Nicklaus, José María Olazábal, Mark O'Meara, Gary Player, Vijay Singh (4,10,13,14,15,16,17), Craig Stadler, Tom Watson, Mike Weir (11,14,16,17), Tiger Woods (2,3,4,14,15,16,17), Ian Woosnam, Fuzzy Zoeller

- George Archer, Seve Ballesteros, Gay Brewer, Jack Burke Jr., Doug Ford, Bob Goalby, Byron Nelson, and Arnold Palmer did not play.

2. U.S. Open champions (last five years)
Jim Furyk (16,17), Retief Goosen (10,11,14,15,16,17)

3. The Open champions (last five years)
Ben Curtis, David Duval, Ernie Els (10,12,13,14,16,17), Todd Hamilton (12,14,16,17)

4. PGA champions (last five years)
Rich Beem, Shaun Micheel, David Toms (14,15,16,17)

5. The Players Championship winners (last three years)
Fred Funk (11,14,15,17), Davis Love III (10,14,16,17), Adam Scott (14,15,16,17)

6. U.S. Amateur champion and runner-up
Luke List (a), Ryan Moore (a,8)

7. The Amateur champion
Stuart Wilson (a)

8. U.S. Amateur Public Links champion

- Eligible under category 6

9. U.S. Mid-Amateur champion
Austin Eaton III (a)

10. Top 16 players and ties from the 2004 Masters
Paul Casey (16,17), K. J. Choi (14,16,17), Chris DiMarco (13,14,16,17), Sergio García (14,16,17), Pádraig Harrington (16,17), Charles Howell III (14,17), Nick Price, Kirk Triplett (14), Casey Wittenberg

11. Top eight players and ties from the 2004 U.S. Open
Robert Allenby (16,17), Steve Flesch (14,16,17), Jeff Maggert, Shigeki Maruyama (14,16,17)

12. Top four players and ties from the 2004 Open Championship
Lee Westwood (16,17)

13. Top four players and ties from 2004 PGA Championship
Justin Leonard (16,17), Chris Riley (16)

14. Top 40 players from the 2004 PGA Tour money list
Stephen Ames (16,17), Stuart Appleby (16,17), Chad Campbell (16,17), Stewart Cink (16,17), Darren Clarke (16,17), John Daly (16), Luke Donald (15,16,17), Carlos Franco, Jay Haas (16,17), Mark Hensby (16,17), Tim Herron (17), Zach Johnson (16,17), Jonathan Kaye (16,17), Jerry Kelly (16,17), Ryan Palmer, Rod Pampling (16), Jesper Parnevik, Kenny Perry (16,17), Ted Purdy, Rory Sabbatini (16,17), Bo Van Pelt, Scott Verplank (16,17)

15. Top 10 players from the 2005 PGA Tour money list on March 28
Tom Lehman (17), Joe Ogilvie

16. Top 50 players from the final 2004 world ranking
Thomas Bjørn (17), Ángel Cabrera (17), Joakim Haeggman, David Howell (17), Trevor Immelman, Freddie Jacobson, Miguel Ángel Jiménez (17), Thomas Levet, Peter Lonard (17), Nick O'Hern (17), Ian Poulter (17)

17. Top 50 players from world ranking published March 28
Tim Clark, Graeme McDowell, Craig Parry

18. Special foreign invitation
Shingo Katayama

== Round summaries ==
=== First round ===
Thursday, April 7, 2005
Friday, April 8, 2005

Sixty-eight players were on the course when darkness suspended the first round since the start of the round was delayed by over five hours due to heavy morning rain. The round was completed Friday morning. Chris DiMarco shot a five-under 67 to take the first round lead. Vijay Singh and Luke Donald were at 68, one stroke behind in second. Tiger Woods struggled through much of his round ending at two over par. After the round, Woods was questioned by rules officials for an illegal putting stance on the 14th before getting the all-clear. In his final appearance, Billy Casper shot the worst round in Masters history on Thursday, a triple-digit 106 (+34), but the round was unofficial because he withdrew. Three-time champion Nick Faldo withdrew while playing the ninth hole due to back spasms.

| Place | Player | Score | To par |
|---|---|---|---|
| 1 | (United States) Chris DiMarco | 67 | −5 |
| T2 | (England) Luke Donald | 68 | −4 |
| T2 | (Fiji) Vijay Singh | 68 | −4 |
| T4 | (Australia) Stuart Appleby | 69 | −3 |
| T4 | (Australia) Mark Hensby | 69 | −3 |
| T6 | (United States) Phil Mickelson | 70 | −2 |
| T6 | (United States) Ryan Palmer | 70 | −2 |
| T8 | (Denmark) Thomas Bjørn | 71 | −1 |
| T8 | (South Africa) Retief Goosen | 71 | −1 |
| T8 | (France) Thomas Levet | 71 | −1 |
| T8 | (United States) Ryan Moore (a) | 71 | −1 |
| T8 | (United States) Chris Riley | 71 | −1 |
| T8 | (Australia) Adam Scott | 71 | −1 |

=== Second round ===
Friday, April 8, 2005
Saturday, April 9, 2005

Rain suspended play for much of the day and the second round spilled into Saturday. Chris DiMarco posted another five-under 67 to take a four-stroke lead at the halfway point. Thomas Bjørn also shot a 67 to take second place by himself at −6. Tiger Woods recovered from his poor first round with a six-under 66, six strokes back in third place.

| Place | Player | Score | To par |
|---|---|---|---|
| 1 | (United States) Chris DiMarco | 67-67=134 | −10 |
| 2 | (Denmark) Thomas Bjørn | 71-67=138 | −6 |
| 3 | (United States) Tiger Woods | 74-66=140 | −4 |
| T4 | (England) David Howell | 72-69=141 | −3 |
| T4 | (Fiji) Vijay Singh | 68-73=141 | −3 |
| T6 | (Australia) Mark Hensby | 69-73=142 | −2 |
| T6 | (United States) Phil Mickelson | 70-72=142 | −2 |
| T6 | (United States) Ryan Moore (a) | 71-71=142 | −2 |
| T9 | (United States) Jim Furyk | 76-67=143 | −1 |
| T9 | (United States) Kirk Triplett | 75-68=143 | −1 |

Amateurs: Moore (−2), List (+2), Eaton III (+14), Wilson (+20).

=== Third round ===
Saturday, April 9, 2005
Sunday, April 10, 2005

Chris DiMarco continued his hot ways shooting a three-under 33 on the front nine before play was suspended due to darkness. His −13 through 45 holes was four strokes better than Tiger Woods, who shot a five-under 31 on the first nine holes. Thomas Bjørn stayed in contention with a two-under 34 for nine holes and was −8 for the championship.

| Place | Player | To par | Hole |
|---|---|---|---|
| 1 | (United States) Chris DiMarco | −13 | 9 |
| 2 | (United States) Tiger Woods | −9 | 9 |
| 3 | (Denmark) Thomas Bjørn | −8 | 9 |
| T4 | (Australia) Mark Hensby | −4 | 9 |
| T4 | (Fiji) Vijay Singh | −4 | 10 |
| T4 | (Australia) Rod Pampling | −4 | 12 |

Tiger Woods resumed play on Sunday morning on the back nine and made four consecutive birdies to card a 7-under 65 and take the 54-hole lead. Dating back to play on Saturday, Woods birdied seven straight holes in the third round, tying a record by Steve Pate. Chris DiMarco struggled in with a 41 (+5) back nine for a third round 74 (+2), losing seven shots to Woods in the final nine holes. DiMarco's troubles began when his second shot at the 10th went into a bush and was unplayable. After a drop, he chipped onto the green and two-putted for the double bogey, which ended a streak of 44 holes at par or better.

| Place | Player | Score | To par |
|---|---|---|---|
| 1 | (United States) Tiger Woods | 74-66-65=205 | −11 |
| 2 | (United States) Chris DiMarco | 67-67-74=208 | −8 |
| 3 | (Denmark) Thomas Bjørn | 71-67-71=209 | −7 |
| T4 | (South Africa) Trevor Immelman | 73-73-65=211 | −5 |
| T4 | (United States) Phil Mickelson | 70-72-69=211 | −5 |
| T6 | (Australia) Mark Hensby | 69-73-70=212 | −4 |
| T6 | (Fiji) Vijay Singh | 68-73-71=212 | −4 |
| T8 | (United States) Chad Campbell | 73-73-67=213 | −3 |
| T8 | (Canada) Mike Weir | 74-71-68=213 | −3 |
| T10 | (England) Luke Donald | 68-77-69=214 | −2 |
| T10 | (United States) Tim Herron | 76-68-70=214 | −2 |
| T10 | (France) Thomas Levet | 71-75-68=214 | −2 |
| T10 | (Australia) Rod Pampling | 73-71-70=214 | −2 |

==== Scorecard ====
Third round

| Hole | 1 | 2 | 3 | 4 | 5 | 6 | 7 | 8 | 9 | 10 | 11 | 12 | 13 | 14 | 15 | 16 | 17 | 18 |
|---|---|---|---|---|---|---|---|---|---|---|---|---|---|---|---|---|---|---|
| Par | 4 | 5 | 4 | 3 | 4 | 3 | 4 | 5 | 4 | 4 | 4 | 3 | 5 | 4 | 5 | 3 | 4 | 4 |
| (United States) Woods | −4 | −5 | −6 | −6 | −6 | −6 | −7 | −8 | −9 | −10 | −11 | −12 | −13 | −12 | −11 | −11 | −11 | −11 |
| (United States) DiMarco | −10 | −11 | −11 | −11 | −11 | −11 | −12 | −13 | −13 | −11 | −11 | −11 | −11 | −10 | −9 | −9 | −8 | −8 |

Cumulative tournament scores, relative to par

=== Final round ===
Sunday, April 10, 2005

==== Summary ====
External videos
- Full final round coverage on CBS on YouTube

A thrilling final round came down to a two-man duel between Tiger Woods and Chris DiMarco. DiMarco narrowed the three shot lead to one by the 11th with a second birdie in three holes after Woods had dropped a shot at the 10th. The lead stretched back to two when DiMarco bogeyed the 12th at the heart of Amen Corner, but a stunning approach on 14 set up a birdie for DiMarco and cut the gap back to one.

Both players birdied 15 and set up a dramatic and memorable 16th hole. With DiMarco sitting comfortably in the center of the green Woods pulled his tee shot just off the green; with about 50 feet (15 m) between him and the hole, and considering the difficulty of the lie, co-commentator Lanny Wadkins remarked that "this is one of the toughest pitches on the entire place here", and that "there's a good chance he doesn't get this inside DiMarco's ball", who had left himself a good 20 feet (6 m) away. Aiming at least 20 feet (6 m) to the left of the pin and intending to use the sloping green to run the ball towards the hole, Woods proceeded to play what was voted in 2019 as the greatest shot in Masters history. The ball crept towards the hole and appeared to stop on the lip of the hole before toppling in for a dramatic birdie, prompting lead commentator Verne Lundquist to give the now iconic piece of commentary: "Well... here it comes... Oh, my goodness... OH, WOW! In your life have you seen anything like that!?". DiMarco missed his birdie putt and the lead grew back to two with just two to play. However, Woods pushed his drive on 17 leading to a bogey, cutting the lead to one as they went to the 72nd hole.

Woods' approach on 18 ended up in the greenside bunker while DiMarco ended up just short of the green. DiMarco's chip for birdie hit the pin and rebounded ten feet away when it could easily have jammed in the hole. Woods hit his chip to 14 feet (4 m), but missed his par putt to win. DiMarco calmly sank a ten-foot (3 m) putt to force a playoff.

Retief Goosen had the round of the day, firing a five under 67 which was the only round better than DiMarco's 68.

==== Final leaderboard ====
Champion
Silver Cup winner (low amateur)
(a) = amateur
(c) = past champion

Top 10
| Place | Player | Score | To par | Money (US$) |
|---|---|---|---|---|
| T1 | (United States) Chris DiMarco | 67-67-74-68=276 | −12 | Playoff |
| T1 | (United States) Tiger Woods (c) | 74-66-65-71=276 | −12 | Playoff |
| T3 | (England) Luke Donald | 68-77-69-69=283 | −5 | 406,000 |
| T3 | (South Africa) Retief Goosen | 71-75-70-67=283 | −5 | 406,000 |
| T5 | (Australia) Mark Hensby | 69-73-70-72=284 | −4 | 237,300 |
| T5 | (South Africa) Trevor Immelman | 73-73-65-73=284 | −4 | 237,300 |
| T5 | (Australia) Rod Pampling | 73-71-70-70=284 | −4 | 237,300 |
| T5 | (Fiji) Vijay Singh (c) | 68-73-71-72=284 | −4 | 237,300 |
| T5 | (Canada) Mike Weir (c) | 74-71-68-71=284 | −4 | 237,300 |
| 10 | (United States) Phil Mickelson (c) | 70-72-69-74=285 | −3 | 189,000 |

Leaderboard below the top 10
| Place | Player | Score | To par | Money ($) |
|---|---|---|---|---|
| T11 | (United States) Tim Herron | 76-68-70-72=286 | −2 | 168,000 |
| T11 | (England) David Howell | 72-69-76-69=286 | −2 | 168,000 |
| T13 | (United States) Tom Lehman | 74-74-70-69=287 | −1 | 135,333 |
| T13 | (United States) Justin Leonard | 75-71-70-71=287 | −1 | 135,333 |
| T13 | (France) Thomas Levet | 71-75-68-73=287 | −1 | 135,333 |
| T13 | (United States) Ryan Moore (a) | 71-71-75-70=287 | −1 | 0 |
| T17 | (United States) Chad Campbell | 73-73-67-75=288 | E | 112,000 |
| T17 | (Northern Ireland) Darren Clarke | 72-76-69-71=288 | E | 112,000 |
| T17 | (United States) Kirk Triplett | 75-68-72-73=288 | E | 112,000 |
| T20 | (United States) Stewart Cink | 72-72-74-71=289 | +1 | 84,840 |
| T20 | (United States) Jerry Kelly | 75-70-73-71=289 | +1 | 84,840 |
| T20 | (Germany) Bernhard Langer (c) | 74-74-70-71=289 | +1 | 84,840 |
| T20 | (United States) Jeff Maggert | 74-74-72-69=289 | +1 | 84,840 |
| T20 | (United States) Scott Verplank | 72-75-69-73=289 | +1 | 84,840 |
| T25 | (Denmark) Thomas Bjørn | 71-67-71-81=290 | +2 | 61,600 |
| T25 | (United States) Joe Ogilvie | 74-73-73-70=290 | +2 | 61,600 |
| T25 | (Australia) Craig Parry | 72-75-69-74=290 | +2 | 61,600 |
| 28 | (United States) Jim Furyk | 76-67-74-74=291 | +3 | 53,900 |
| T29 | (United States) Steve Flesch | 76-70-70-76=292 | +4 | 50,750 |
| T29 | (United States) Kenny Perry | 76-68-71-77=292 | +4 | 50,750 |
| T31 | (Spain) Miguel Ángel Jiménez | 74-74-73-72=293 | +5 | 46,550 |
| T31 | (United States) Mark O'Meara (c) | 72-74-72-75=293 | +5 | 46,550 |
| T33 | (South Korea) K. J. Choi | 73-72-76-73=294 | +6 | 39,620 |
| T33 | (Japan) Shingo Katayama | 72-74-73-75=294 | +6 | 39,620 |
| T33 | (United States) Luke List (a) | 77-69-78-70=294 | +6 | 0 |
| T33 | (England) Ian Poulter | 72-74-72-76=294 | +6 | 39,620 |
| T33 | (Australia) Adam Scott | 71-76-72-75=294 | +6 | 39,620 |
| T33 | (United States) Casey Wittenberg | 72-72-74-76=294 | +6 | 39,620 |
| T39 | (South Africa) Tim Clark | 74-74-72-75=295 | +7 | 32,200 |
| T39 | (United States) Fred Couples (c) | 75-71-77-72=295 | +7 | 32,200 |
| T39 | (United States) Todd Hamilton | 77-70-71-77=295 | +7 | 32,200 |
| T39 | (United States) Ryan Palmer | 70-74-74-77=295 | +7 | 32,200 |
| T43 | (Australia) Stuart Appleby | 69-76-72-79=296 | +8 | 28,000 |
| T43 | (United States) Jonathan Kaye | 72-74-76-74=296 | +8 | 28,000 |
| T45 | (Trinidad and Tobago) Stephen Ames | 73-74-75-75=297 | +9 | 25,200 |
| T45 | (Australia) Nick O'Hern | 72-72-76-77=297 | +9 | 25,200 |
| 47 | (South Africa) Ernie Els | 75-73-78-72=298 | +10 | 23,100 |
| 48 | (United States) Jay Haas | 76-71-76-78=301 | +13 | 21,700 |
| 49 | (United States) Chris Riley | 71-77-78-78=304 | +16 | 20,300 |
| 50 | (United States) Craig Stadler (c) | 75-73-79-79=306 | +18 | 19,180 |
| CUT | (Paraguay) Carlos Franco | 76-73=149 | +5 | |
| CUT | (Spain) Sergio García | 77-72=149 | +5 | |
| CUT | (Republic of Ireland) Pádraig Harrington | 72-77=149 | +5 | |
| CUT | (United States) Charles Howell III | 73-76=149 | +5 | |
| CUT | (Northern Ireland) Graeme McDowell | 79-70=149 | +5 | |
| CUT | (Australia) Robert Allenby | 77-73=150 | +6 | |
| CUT | (Argentina) Ángel Cabrera | 77-73=150 | +6 | |
| CUT | (United States) Fred Funk | 72-78=150 | +6 | |
| CUT | (England) Lee Westwood | 78-72=150 | +6 | |
| CUT | (Sweden) Joakim Haeggman | 79-72=151 | +7 | |
| CUT | (United States) Davis Love III | 76-75=151 | +7 | |
| CUT | (Sweden) Jesper Parnevik | 77-74=151 | +7 | |
| CUT | (United States) Bo Van Pelt | 76-75=151 | +7 | |
| CUT | (United States) Rich Beem | 75-77=152 | +8 | |
| CUT | (United States) Ben Curtis | 80-72=152 | +8 | |
| CUT | (United States) David Duval | 75-77=152 | +8 | |
| CUT | (United States) Raymond Floyd (c) | 76-76=152 | +8 | |
| CUT | (Sweden) Freddie Jacobson | 77-75=152 | +8 | |
| CUT | (United States) Zach Johnson | 81-71=152 | +8 | |
| CUT | (Australia) Peter Lonard | 75-77=152 | +8 | |
| CUT | (Scotland) Sandy Lyle (c) | 74-78=152 | +8 | |
| CUT | (South Africa) Rory Sabbatini | 80-72=152 | +8 | |
| CUT | (United States) David Toms | 77-75=152 | +8 | |
| CUT | (United States) Shaun Micheel | 75-78=153 | +9 | |
| CUT | (United States) Larry Mize (c) | 78-75=153 | +9 | |
| CUT | (United States) Jack Nicklaus (c) | 77-76=153 | +9 | |
| CUT | (Spain) José María Olazábal (c) | 77-76=153 | +9 | |
| CUT | (United States) Tom Watson (c) | 77-76=153 | +9 | |
| CUT | (United States) John Daly | 80-74=154 | +10 | |
| CUT | (Zimbabwe) Nick Price | 78-76=154 | +10 | |
| CUT | (United States) Ted Purdy | 77-78=155 | +11 | |
| CUT | (United States) Ben Crenshaw (c) | 76-80=156 | +12 | |
| CUT | (Wales) Ian Woosnam (c) | 78-78=156 | +12 | |
| CUT | (England) Paul Casey | 79-78=157 | +13 | |
| CUT | (United States) Austin Eaton III (a) | 81-77=158 | +14 | |
| CUT | (Japan) Shigeki Maruyama | 82-76=158 | +14 | |
| CUT | (United States) Tommy Aaron (c) | 79-82=161 | +17 | |
| CUT | (United States) Fuzzy Zoeller (c) | 84-78=162 | +18 | |
| CUT | (Scotland) Stuart Wilson (a) | 82-82=164 | +20 | |
| CUT | (South Africa) Gary Player (c) | 88-79=167 | +23 | |
| CUT | (United States) Charles Coody (c) | 88-83=171 | +27 | |
| WD | (United States) Billy Casper (c) | | | |
| WD | (England) Nick Faldo (c) | | | |

==== Scorecard ====
| Hole | 1 | 2 | 3 | 4 | 5 | 6 | 7 | 8 | 9 | 10 | 11 | 12 | 13 | 14 | 15 | 16 | 17 | 18 |
|---|---|---|---|---|---|---|---|---|---|---|---|---|---|---|---|---|---|---|
| Par | 4 | 5 | 4 | 3 | 4 | 3 | 4 | 5 | 4 | 4 | 4 | 3 | 5 | 4 | 5 | 3 | 4 | 4 |
| (United States) Woods | −12 | −13 | −13 | −13 | −12 | −12 | −12 | −12 | −13 | −12 | −12 | −12 | −12 | −12 | −13 | −14 | −13 | −12 |
| (United States) DiMarco | −8 | −9 | −9 | −9 | −9 | −9 | −9 | −9 | −10 | −10 | −11 | −10 | −10 | −11 | −12 | −12 | −12 | −12 |
| (England) Donald | −2 | −2 | −2 | −2 | −2 | −2 | −1 | −1 | −1 | +1 | E | E | −2 | −2 | −4 | −5 | −5 | −5 |
| (South Africa) Goosen | −1 | −2 | −1 | −1 | −1 | −1 | −1 | −1 | −1 | −1 | −1 | −1 | −2 | −2 | −3 | −4 | −4 | −5 |
| (Australia) Hensby | −4 | −4 | −4 | −4 | −4 | −4 | −4 | −5 | −5 | −4 | −2 | −3 | −3 | −3 | −4 | −5 | −5 | −4 |
| (South Africa) Immelman | −4 | −4 | −4 | −4 | −5 | −6 | −6 | −6 | −6 | −6 | −5 | −5 | −3 | −3 | −3 | −5 | −4 | −4 |
| (Australia) Pampling | −2 | −2 | −1 | −2 | −2 | −2 | −1 | −1 | −2 | −2 | −2 | −2 | −2 | −3 | −4 | −4 | −4 | −4 |
| (Fiji) Singh | −4 | −4 | −3 | −2 | −1 | −2 | −2 | −3 | −3 | −3 | −3 | −3 | −3 | −3 | −3 | −3 | −3 | −4 |
| (Canada) Weir | −3 | −4 | −4 | −4 | −4 | −5 | −5 | −5 | −5 | −6 | −6 | −6 | −6 | −6 | −7 | −6 | −5 | −4 |
| (United States) Mickelson | −5 | −5 | −5 | −6 | −6 | −6 | −6 | −6 | −6 | −6 | −6 | −4 | −5 | −5 | −5 | −3 | −3 | −3 |
| (Denmark) Bjørn | −7 | −5 | −5 | −5 | −5 | −4 | −4 | −4 | −4 | −3 | −2 | E | E | E | +1 | +1 | +1 | +2 |

Cumulative tournament scores, relative to par

| Eagle | Birdie | Bogey | Double bogey |

=== Playoff ===
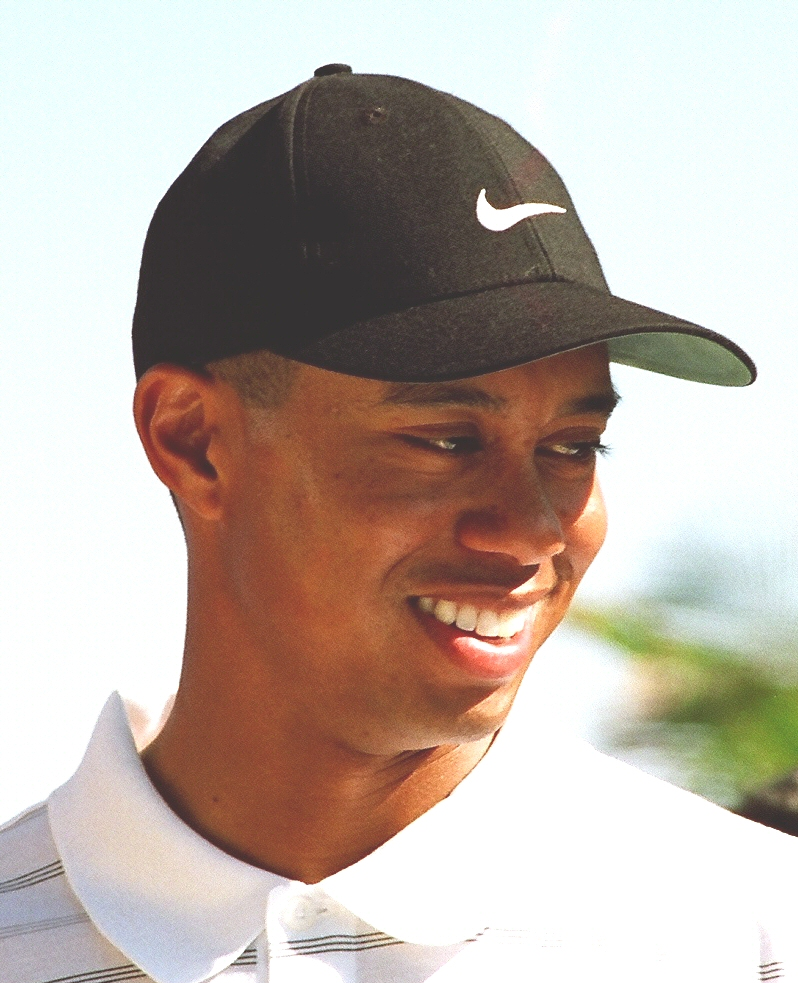
Tiger Woods won his fourth Masters title

The previous six sudden-death playoffs (going back to 1979) at Augusta began at the 10th hole; this was the first to start at the 18th hole, where both put their drives in the fairway. DiMarco hit his approach to the very front section of the green and the ball backed off the green a bit, ending up in almost the exact spot he was at the end of regulation. Woods knocked his approach to 15 feet (4.6 m) past the flag. DiMarco then chipped up to around a foot and tapped in for par. After taking a long time to study the putt, Woods buried his birdie putt to win his fourth green jacket and ninth major title. It was the second consecutive major that DiMarco lost in a playoff following his loss in the PGA Championship in 2004 to Vijay Singh.

| Place | Player | Score | To par | Money ($) |
|---|---|---|---|---|
| 1 | (United States) Tiger Woods | 3 | −1 | 1,260,000 |
| 2 | (United States) Chris DiMarco | 4 | E | 756,000 |

== Quotes ==
"Here it comes ... Oh, my goodness! ... OH, WOW! IN YOUR LIFE, have you seen anything like that?!" - CBS's Verne Lundquist's famous call of Tiger Woods' chip-in on the 16th hole.

"Chris is a tough competitor and a fighter. He's never going to back off and he proved that again." - Tiger Woods on the gutsy final round of runner-up Chris DiMarco.

""I was just trying to throw the ball up there on the hill and let it feed down there and hopefully have a makeable putt. All of a sudden, it looked really good, and it looked like how could it not go in, and how did it not go in, and all of a sudden it went in." - Tiger Woods on his remarkable chip on 16.

"I went out and shot 68 around here on Sunday, which is a very good round, and 12-under is usually good enough to win. It was just that I was playing against Tiger Woods." - Chris DiMarco on his runner-up finish.

"I would let it hurt if I gave it away but I didn't. I really didn't." - Chris DiMarco

"You know I played him as hard as I could down the stretch, birdieing a bunch of holes coming down the back nine and putting it on him really. And since I put that behind me and went out and put a good number on the back nine, I feel very good." - Chris DiMarco on his final round.

"That was a hard-fought week with the rain delays, I didn't get off to the greatest of starts." - Tiger Woods on the long week of golf.
