= John Bickerton =

English golfer

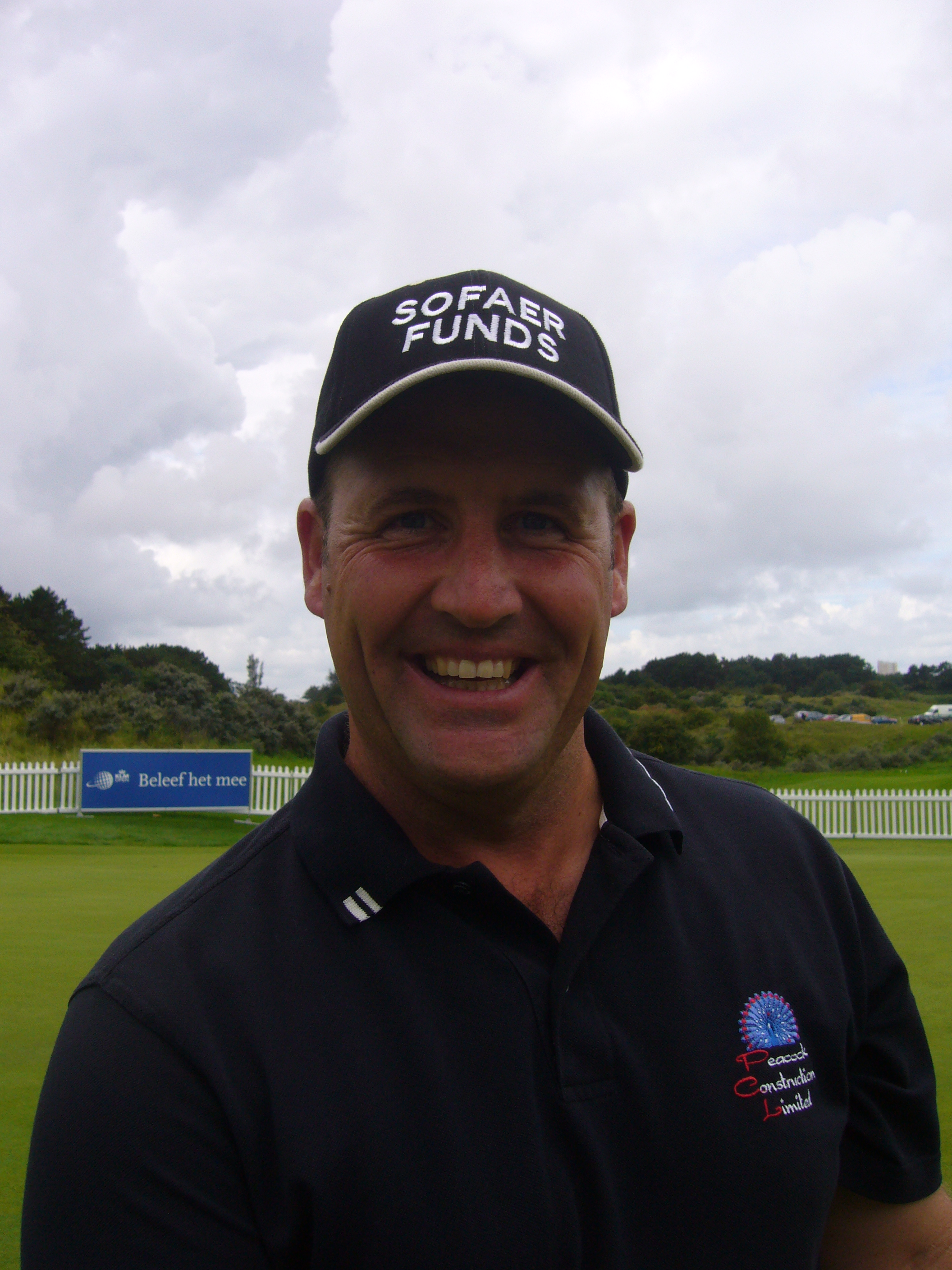

Personal information
- Full name: John Edward Bickerton
- Nationality: England
- Born: 23 December 1969 (age 56) Redditch, England
- Height: 6 ft 0 in (1.83 m)
- Weight: 196 lb (89 kg; 14.0 st)
- Spouse: Annette
- Children: 1

Career
- Sport: Golf
- Turned professional: 1991
- Former tours: European Tour; Challenge Tour
- Professional wins: 4
- Highest ranking: 89 (2 July 2006)

Number of wins by tour
- European Tour: 3
- Challenge Tour: 2

Best results in major championships
- Masters Tournament: DNP
- PGA Championship: CUT: 2006
- U.S. Open: DNP
- The Open Championship: T48: 2006

John Edward Bickerton (born 23 December 1969) is an English professional golfer. He made over 400 appearances on the European Tour, winning three times, including the 2006 Open de France.

== Early life and amateur career ==
Bickerton was born in Redditch, England. He won the 1990 Midland Open Amateur Championship and turned professional in 1991.

== Professional career ==
Bickerton joined the Challenge Tour, Europe's second tier professional golf tour, in 1993. He won the 1994 Gore-Tex Challenge after a playoff, and was runner-up in the Dutch Challenge Open, on his way to 6th on the season-ending money list, which gave him automatic promotion to the European Tour for 1995. He initially struggled to establish himself at Europe's top level, returning to the Challenge Tour in 1997. In 1998, he was runner-up in the Challenge Tour Championship and had a number of other high finishes, leaving him 9th in the end-of-season rankings and a return to the European Tour in 1999.

Bickerton was twice runner-up on the 1999 European Tour, losing in a playoff for the Algarve Portuguese Open and also having a solo second place in the Compass Group English Open, behind Darren Clarke. With three fourth-place finishes he ended 20th in the Order of Merit. His high finish in the 1999 Order of Merit gave him a place in the Great Britain & Ireland team in the inaugural Seve Trophy in April 2000.

After his two second-place finishes in 1999, Bickerton has further runner-up finishes in the 2001 Madeira Island Open, the 2002 Celtic Manor Resort Wales Open and in the 2002 BMW International Open. After 287 events he won on the European Tour for the first time in October 2005, at the Abama Open de Canarias, a dual-ranking event with the Challenge Tour. In April 2006 he was runner-up to Niclas Fasth in the Andalucía Open de España Valle Romano, losing in a playoff. In July 2006 he claimed his second tour title at one of the European Tour's richest events, the Open de France, winning by a stroke from Pádraig Harrington, and taking the first prize of €666,660. After this win, Bickerton entered the top 100 in the world rankings and received invitations to the 2006 Open Championship and the 2006 PGA Championship. He finished tied for the 48th place in the Open, his best result in a major championship, but missed the cut in the PGA Championship. Bickerton had his third European Tour win in December 2007, at the Alfred Dunhill Championship in South Africa, winning by a stroke from Ernie Els and Lee Slattery.

Bickerton played regularly on the European Tour from 1999 to 2009, eventually making over 400 appearances. His best finishes on the European Tour Order of Merit were 20th in both 1999 and 2006. From 2010 his appearances on the tour were limited by an elbow injury, and he eventually gave up his place on the tour. After leaving the European Tour, Bickerton became the resident professional at Minehead and West Somerset Golf Club in Somerset.

== Amateur wins ==
- 1990 Midland Open Amateur Championship

== Professional wins (4) ==
=== European Tour wins (3) ===
No.	Date	Tournament	Winning score	Margin of victory	Runner(s)-up
1	9 Oct 2005	Abama Open de Canarias^{1}	−10 (69-68-69-68=274)	5 strokes	(South Africa) Michael Kirk, (England) Stuart Little
2	2 Jul 2006	Open de France Alstom	−11 (63-70-71-69=273)	1 stroke	(Republic of Ireland) Pádraig Harrington
3	9 Dec 2007 (2008 season)	Alfred Dunhill Championship^{2}	−13 (70-69-68-68=275)	1 stroke	(South Africa) Ernie Els, (England) Lee Slattery

^{1}Dual-ranking event with the Challenge Tour
^{2}Co-sanctioned by the Sunshine Tour

European Tour playoff record (0–2)

No.	Year	Tournament	Opponent	Result
1	1999	Algarve Portuguese Open	(England) Van Phillips	Lost to par on first extra hole
2	2006	Andalucía Open de España Valle Romano	(Sweden) Niclas Fasth	Lost to birdie on fourth extra hole

=== Challenge Tour wins (2) ===
No.	Date	Tournament	Winning score	Margin of victory	Runner(s)-up
1	26 Aug 1994	Gore-Tex Challenge	−12 (70-70-67-73=280)	Playoff	(Scotland) Lee Vannet
2	9 Oct 2005	Abama Open de Canarias^{1}	−10 (69-68-69-68=274)	5 strokes	(South Africa) Michael Kirk, (England) Stuart Little

^{1}Dual-ranking event with the European Tour

Challenge Tour playoff record (1–0)

No.	Year	Tournament	Opponent	Result
1	1994	Gore-Tex Challenge	(Scotland) Lee Vannet	Won with par on fourth extra hole

== Results in major championships ==
Tournament	1995	1996	1997	1998	1999
The Open Championship	CUT				
PGA Championship					

Tournament	2000	2001	2002	2003	2004	2005	2006	2007
The Open Championship	CUT	CUT	CUT			T60	T48	CUT
PGA Championship							CUT	

Note: Bickerton never played in the Masters Tournament or the U.S. Open.

Did not play

CUT = missed the half-way cut
"T" = tied

== Results in World Golf Championships ==
Tournament	2006	2007
Match Play		
Championship	T45	T50
Invitational	T66	

Did not play

"T" = Tied

== Team appearances ==
Professional

- Seve Trophy (representing Great Britain & Ireland): 2000
