= Valderrama Golf Club =

Golf course in southern Spain

Coordinates: 36°17′09″N 5°20′02″W

Real Club Valderrama
- Interactive map of Real Club Valderrama

Club information
- Location: San Roque, Cádiz, Spain
- Established: 1974
- Type: Private, with limited tee-times for visitors
- Owner: Club de Golf Valderrama, S.A.
- Tota holes: 18
- Tournaments: Andalucía Masters (2010–2011, 2017–); Volvo Masters (1988–96, 2002–08); Ryder Cup (1997); WGC-American Express Championship (1999–2000)
- Website: www.valderrama.com
- Designed by: Robert Trent Jones (1975) Kyle Phillips (2012 renovation)
- Par: 71
- Length: 6,390 m (6,990 yd)
- Course rating: 76.1
- Slope rating: 147

The Real Club Valderrama (Spanish pronunciation: [reˈal ˈkluβ βaldeˈrama]; "Royal Valderrama Club") is one of the best known golf clubs in the world. It is located in the Mediterranean resort of Sotogrande, San Roque in the Andalusia region of southern Spain, up the coast a few miles from the Strait of Gibraltar. Valderrama has a single 18-hole course, along with a 9-hole par 3 course.

Valderrama was the traditional host of the now defunct Volvo Masters, hosting the event from 1988 to 2008, with a five-year break when the event was moved to the Montecastillo Golf Club. Valderrama also hosted the Ryder Cup in 1997, the first time the event had been held outside either the United States or United Kingdom, the WGC-American Express Championship in 1999 and 2000, and several other professional tournaments on both the European Tour and Ladies European Tour.

== Facilities ==
=== Golf course ===
Valderrama was constructed in 1974 as "Sotogrande New," to the designs of leading American golf course architect Robert Trent Jones. Renamed "Las Aves" in 1981, it was acquired by Jaime Ortiz-Patiño in 1984. The golf course was redesigned and expanded by the original architect and became "Valderrama." By 1999, Valderrama was rated the top course in mainland Europe by Golf World magazine.

==== Signature hole ====
The fourth hole, La Cascada, is the course's signature hole. It is a par 5 with a pond to the right of the two-tiered green. Before the 2016 Open de España, three national teams of four players tried to complete La Cascada in the fastest time. The French team of Raphaël Jacquelin, Alexander Lévy, Grégory Havret and Romain Wattel took four shots to complete the hole in 34.87 seconds, breaking the previous Guinness world record by half.

=== Driving range ===
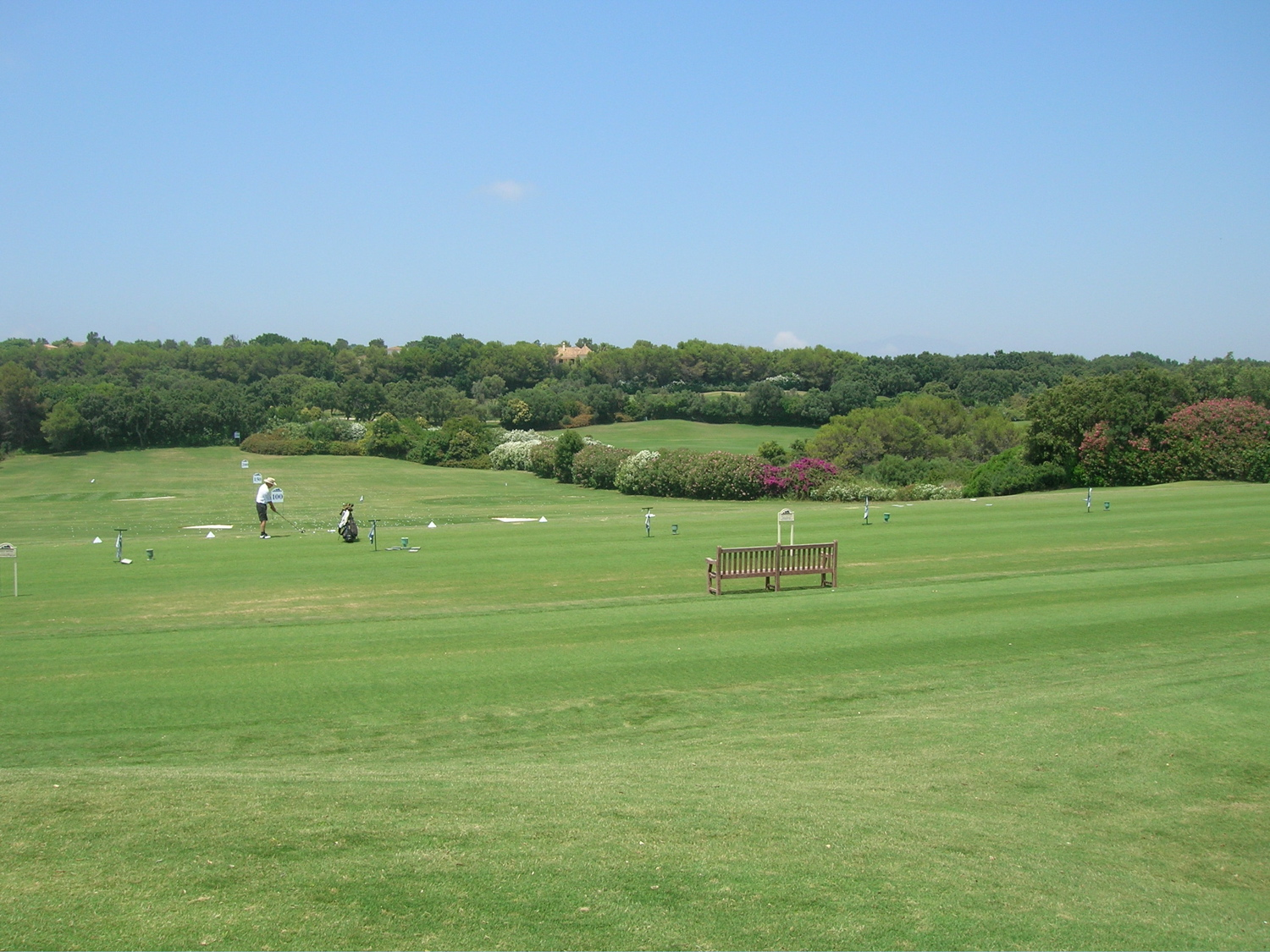
Valderrama Driving Range

== Tournaments hosted ==
- Ladies Spanish Open: 1982
- Volvo Masters: 1988–1996; 2002–2008
- Ryder Cup: 1997 (the first ever held in Continental Europe)
- WGC-American Express Championship: 1999, 2000
- Andalucía Masters: 2010–2011, 2017–2022
- Open de España: 2016
- LIV Golf Valderrama: 2023

== See also ==
- 1997 Ryder Cup
- List of golf clubs granted Royal status
