= 2005 HSBC World Match Play Championship =

Coordinates: 51°23′48″N 0°35′45″W

Tournament information
- Dates: 15–18 September 2005
- Location: Virginia Water, Surrey, England
- Course: Wentworth Club
- Tour: European Tour
- Format: Match play – 36 holes

Statistics
- Par: 72
- Length: 7,073 yards (6,468 m)
- Field: 16 players
- Prize fund: £1,660,000
- Winner's share: £1,000,000

Champion
- (New Zealand) Michael Campbell
- def. Paul McGinley 2 & 1

The 2005 HSBC World Match Play Championship was the 42nd HSBC World Match Play Championship played and the 2nd time played as an official European Tour event. It was played from 15–18 September at the Wentworth Club. The champion received €1,443,830 (£1,000,000 or $2,042,513.20) making it the biggest first prize in golf at the time. Each match was played over 36 holes. Michael Campbell defeated Paul McGinley 2 and 1 in the final to win the tournament for the first time.

== Course ==
Front nine	1	2	3	4	5	6	7	8	9	Out
Yardage	474	154	447	496	191	354	396	400	452	3,364
Par	4	3	4	5	3	4	4	4	4	35

Back nine	10	11	12	13	14	15	16	17	18	In
Yardage	184	404	509	467	179	481	383	571	531	3,709
Par	3	4	5	4	3	4	4	5	5	37

	Front 9	Back 9	Total
Yardage	3,364	3,709	7,073
Par	35	37	72

== Bracket ==
First round 15 September
1	(South Africa) Retief Goosen	8&7
16	(England) Kenneth Ferrie
8	(Scotland) Colin Montgomerie
9	(Australia) Mark Hensby	2&1
5	(South Africa) Tim Clark
12	(Australia) Steve Elkington	6&5
4	(New Zealand) Michael Campbell	1up
13	(Australia) Geoff Ogilvy
6	(England) Luke Donald	7&6
11	(Germany) Bernhard Langer
3	(Denmark) Thomas Bjørn
14	(Republic of Ireland) Paul McGinley	6&5
7	(England) David Howell
10	(Spain) José María Olazábal	1up
2	(Argentina) Ángel Cabrera	2&1
15	(South Africa) Trevor Immelman

Quarterfinals; 16 September
1	(South Africa) Retief Goosen	12&11
9	(Australia) Mark Hensby
12	(Australia) Steve Elkington
4	(New Zealand) Michael Campbell	37h
6	(England) Luke Donald
14	(Republic of Ireland) Paul McGinley	9&8
10	(Spain) José María Olazábal
2	(Argentina) Ángel Cabrera	4&3

Semifinals; 17 September
1	(South Africa) Retief Goosen
4	(New Zealand) Michael Campbell	7&6
14	(Republic of Ireland) Paul McGinley	4&3
10	(Argentina) Ángel Cabrera

Championship; 18 September
4	(New Zealand) Michael Campbell	2&1
14	(Republic of Ireland) Paul McGinley

== Prize money breakdown ==
=== Actual prize fund ===
Place	Euro (€)	Pounds (£)	US ($)
Champion	1,443,830	1,000,000	2,042,513
Runner-Up	577,532	400,000	817,005
Losing Semi Finalist x 2	173,259	120,000	245,101
Losing Quarter Finalists x 4	115,506	80,000	163,400
Losing First Round x 8	86,629	60,000	122,55
Total	€2,945,413	£2,040,000	$4,166,726

=== Breakdown for European Tour Order of Merit ===
Place	Euro (€)	Pounds (£)	US ($)
Champion	597,884	406,660	830,607
Runner-Up	398,594	271,110	553,745
Losing Semi Finalist x 2	201,968	120,000	280,583
Losing Quarter Finalists x 4	118,742	80,000	164,961
Losing First Round x 8	61,972	42,151	86,093
Total	€1,379,120	£938,014.17	$1,915,988

- Source for $US Dollar conversions
