= 2005 U.S. Open (golf) =

Coordinates: 35.1895°N 79.4678°W

Tournament information
- Dates: June 16–19, 2005
- Location: Pinehurst, North Carolina
- Courses: Pinehurst Resort, Course No. 2
- Organized by: USGA
- Tours: PGA Tour; European Tour; Japan Golf Tour

Statistics
- Par: 70
- Length: 7,214 yards (6,596 m)
- Field: 156 players, 83 after cut
- Cut: 148 (+8)
- Prize fund: $6,250,000 €5,153,803
- Winner's share: $1,170,000 €964,792

Champion
- (New Zealand) Michael Campbell
- 280 (E)

Location in the United States
Location in North Carolina

The 2005 United States Open Championship was the 105th U.S. Open, held June 16–19 at Pinehurst Resort Course No. 2 in Pinehurst, North Carolina.

Michael Campbell won his only major title, two strokes ahead of runner-up Tiger Woods; third-round leader and two-time U.S. Open champion Retief Goosen collapsed on the final day. It was the second of four U.S. Opens at the course, which first hosted in 1999, when Payne Stewart won his second U.S. Open four months before his death in an aviation accident. Six years was the shortest gap between U.S. Opens at the same site since 1946. The total purse was $6.25 million with a winner's share of $1.17 million.

== History of U.S. Open at Pinehurst No. 2 ==
It was only the second U.S. Open at Pinehurst, because of past concerns of high temperatures and its distance from a major populated area. At the first in 1999, Payne Stewart won his second U.S. Open (and third major). He trailed playing partner Phil Mickelson by one stroke as they played the 16th hole, where he made a 25-foot (8 m) putt for par while Mickelson missed his from 7 feet (2 m). Stewart birdied 17 to take the lead and holed a 15-foot (5 m) par putt on 18. After helping the U.S. regain the Ryder Cup in late September, he died in a plane crash a month later at age 42. Stewart was honored at the 2005 edition with a silhouette of his 1999 victory pose on the flag of the 18th green, also captured in a bronze statue overlooking the 18th green.

Following a restoration by Bill Coore and Ben Crenshaw, the U.S. Open returned for a third time in 2014 and a fourth time in 2024.

== Course layout ==
Course No. 2

Hole	Yards	Par	Hole	Yards	Par
1	401	4	10	607	5
2	469	4	11	476	4
3	336	4	12	449	4
4	565	5	13	378	4
5	472	4	14	468	4
6	220	3	15	203	3
7	404	4	16	492	4
8	467	4	17	190	3
9	175	3	18	442	4
Out	3,509	35	In	3,705	35
Source:		Total		7,214	70

== Field ==
1. Last 10 U.S. Open Champions

Ernie Els (4,8,9,10,12,16), Jim Furyk (16), Retief Goosen (8,9,10,12,13,16), Lee Janzen, Steve Jones, Corey Pavin, Tiger Woods (3,4,5,9,11,12,16)

2. Top two finishers in the 2004 U.S. Amateur

Luke List (a), Ryan Moore (a)

3. Last five Masters Champions

Phil Mickelson (8,9,11,12,16), Mike Weir (8,9,16)

4. Last five British Open Champions

Ben Curtis, David Duval, Todd Hamilton (9,16)

5. Last five PGA Champions

Rich Beem, Shaun Micheel, Vijay Singh (9,11,12,16), David Toms (9,11,12,16)

6. The Players Champion

Fred Funk (8,9,11,12,16)

7. The U.S. Senior Open Champion

Peter Jacobsen

8. Top 15 finishers and ties in the 2004 U.S. Open

Robert Allenby, Stephen Ames (9,16), Tim Clark (16), Chris DiMarco (9,11,16), Steve Flesch (9), Jay Haas (9,16), Tim Herron (16), Spencer Levin, Jeff Maggert, Shigeki Maruyama (9,16)

9. Top 30 leaders on the 2004 PGA Tour official money list

Stuart Appleby (16), Chad Campbell (16), K. J. Choi (16), Stewart Cink (16), John Daly (16), Carlos Franco, Sergio García (10,12,16), Mark Hensby (16), Zach Johnson (16), Jerry Kelly (16), Davis Love III (16), Kenny Perry (11,12,16), Rory Sabbatini (16), Adam Scott (11,16), Scott Verplank (16)

- Darren Clarke (10,16) did not play.

10. Top 15 on the 2004 European Tour Order of Merit

Ángel Cabrera (13,16), Paul Casey, Stephen Gallacher, Pádraig Harrington (16), David Howell (16), Miguel Ángel Jiménez (16), Thomas Levet, Graeme McDowell (16), Nick O'Hern (16), Ian Poulter (16), Lee Westwood (16)

11. Top 10 on the PGA Tour official money list, as of May 30

Luke Donald (16), Justin Leonard (12,16)

12. Winners of multiple PGA Tour events from April 28, 2004, through the 2005 Memorial Tournament

Bart Bryant

13. Top 2 from the 2005 European Tour Order of Merit, as of May 30

14. Top 2 on the 2004 Japan Golf Tour, provided they are within the top 75 point leaders of the Official World Golf Rankings at that time

Shingo Katayama, Toru Taniguchi

15. Top 2 on the 2004 PGA Tour of Australasia, provided they are within the top 75 point leaders of the Official World Golf Rankings at that time

Richard Green

16. Top 50 on the Official World Golf Rankings list, as of May 30

Thomas Bjørn, Fred Couples, Charles Howell III, Tom Lehman, Peter Lonard, Paul McGinley, Colin Montgomerie, Rod Pampling, Craig Parry

17. Special exemptions selected by the USGA

Nick Price

Sectional qualifiers

- Japan: Steven Conran, Keiichiro Fukabori, Yang Yong-eun
- England: Michael Campbell, Nick Dougherty, Simon Dyson, Peter Hanson, Peter Hedblom, Robert Karlsson, Søren Kjeldsen, José-Filipe Lima, Jonathan Lomas
- United States

- Tarzana, California: Scott Gibson (L), Nick Jones (L), Eric Meichtry (L), Michael Ruiz (L)
- Littleton, Colorado: Wil Collins (L)
- Tampa, Florida: Nick Gilliam (L), Josh McCumber (L), Lee Rinker (L)
- Atlanta, Georgia: Aaron Barber (L), Derek Brown (L), Jason Gore (L), Matt Kuchar, Scott Parel (L), Casey Wittenberg
- Lahaina, Hawaii: Pierre-Henri Soero (a,L)
- Glen Ellyn, Illinois: Jim Benepe (L), Jerry Smith
- Chevy Chase, Maryland: Paul Claxton (L)
- Rockville, Maryland: Tommy Armour III, Craig Barlow, D. J. Brigman (L), Olin Browne, David Denham (a,L), James Driscoll, Steve Elkington, Matt Every (a,L), J. P. Hayes, David Hearn, Ryuji Imada, Clint Jensen (L), Franklin Langham, Ian Leggatt, John Mallinger (L), Rocco Mediate, David Oh (L), Michael Putnam (a,L), Rob Rashell, Brandt Snedeker (L), Omar Uresti (L), Lee Williams (a,L)
- Kansas City, Missouri: Tom Pernice Jr.
- Summit, New Jersey: Stephen Allan, Michael Allen, J. J. Henry, J. L. Lewis, Len Mattiace, Chris Nallen
- Columbus, Ohio: Eric Axley, John Cook, Bob Estes, Robert Gamez, Bill Glasson, Brandt Jobe, Bernhard Langer, Frank Lickliter, Steve Lowery, Scott McCarron, John Merrick (L), Arron Oberholser, Joe Ogilvie, Geoff Ogilvy, Carl Pettersson, Ted Purdy, John Rollins, Sal Spallone (L), Bob Tway, Euan Walters
- Galena, Ohio: Patrick Damron (L)
- McKinney, Texas: Trip Kuehne (a), Kyle Willmann (L)
- Snoqualmie, Washington: Troy Kelly (L)

Alternates

- Conrad Ray (Tarzana, L) – replaced Darren Clarke

== Round summaries ==
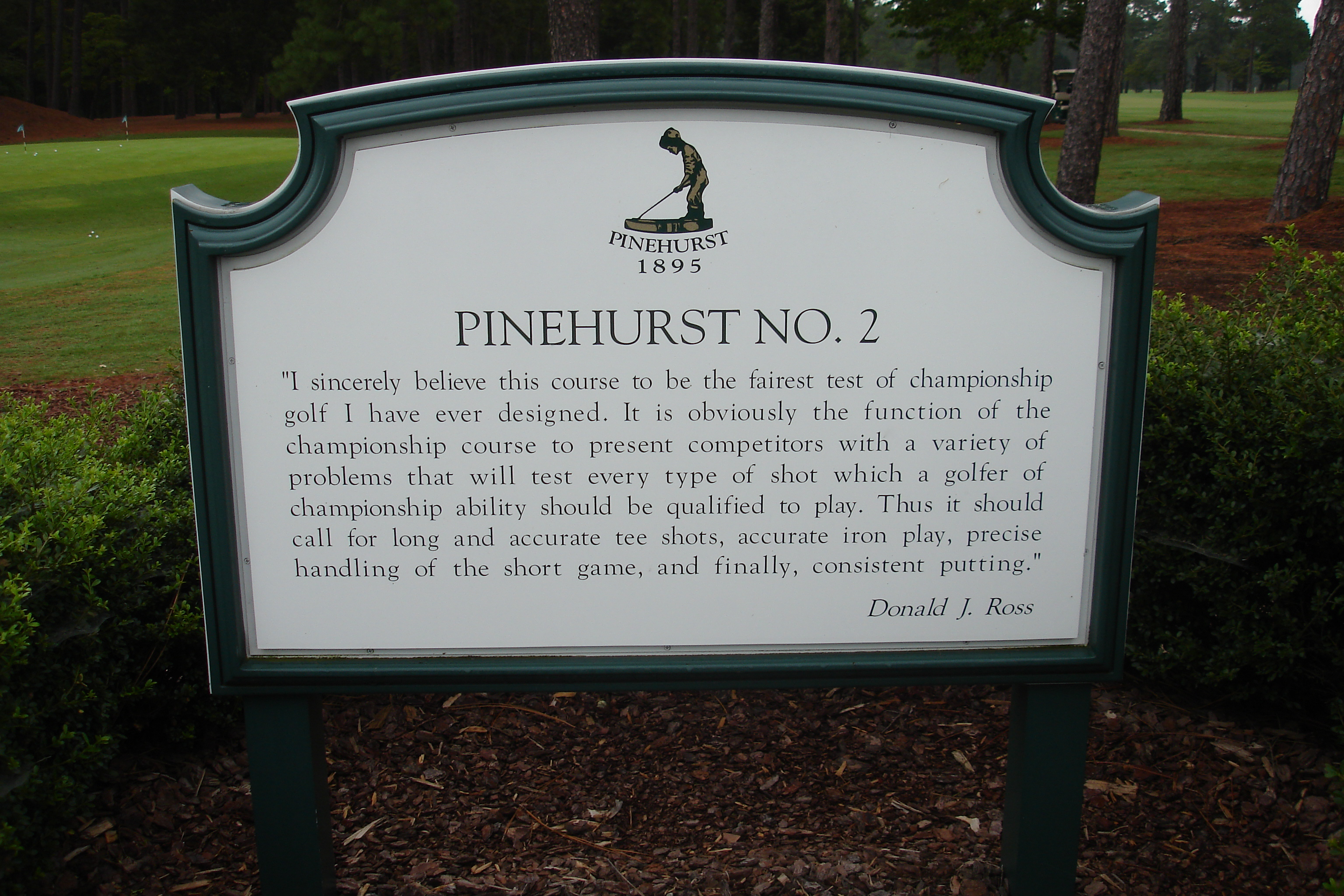

=== First round ===
Thursday, June 16, 2005

Qualifiers Olin Browne and Rocco Mediate had the first round lead at Pinehurst No. 2. While Masters champion Tiger Woods battled to an even-par 70 and two-time winner Ernie Els ground out a 71. Retief Goosen launched his title defense with a three-birdie 68 for a three-way tie for third, 2004 Masters winner Phil Mickelson returned a 69 after holing a 20-foot birdie putt at the last and world number two Vijay Singh opened with a 70.

Place	Player	Score	To par
T1	(United States) Olin Browne	67	−3
T1	(United States) Rocco Mediate	67	−3
T3	(South Africa) Retief Goosen	68	−2
T3	(United States) Brandt Jobe	68	−2
T3	(England) Lee Westwood	68	−2
T6	(South Korea) K. J. Choi	69	−1
T6	(England) Luke Donald	69	−1
T6	(United States) Steve Jones	69	−1
T6	(United States) Phil Mickelson	69	−1
T10	(United States) Tommy Armour III	70	E
T10	(United States) Bob Estes	70	E
T10	(Australia) Adam Scott	70	E
T10	(Fiji) Vijay Singh	70	E
T10	(Japan) Toru Taniguchi	70	E
T10	(United States) David Toms	70	E
T10	(United States) Tiger Woods	70	E

=== Second round ===
Friday, June 17, 2005

Two-time champion Retief Goosen shared the lead in the U.S. Open second round after most of the field struggled on Friday. Trailing by one at the start of the day, he carded an even-par 70 for 138, level with overnight leader Olin Browne and unheralded Jason Gore. Gore, who missed the cut in his only previous U.S. Open appearance in 1998, vaulted up the leaderboard late in the day with a five-birdie 67. South Korea's K. J. Choi (70) and Australian Mark Hensby (68) were tied for fourth at one under. World number two Vijay Singh was a further shot back in a four-way share of sixth after a second successive 70, alongside Spaniard Sergio García and New Zealand's Michael Campbell, who fired matching 69s, and England's Lee Westwood, after a 72. Of the other big names, Tiger Woods was one over after a 71, while Phil Mickelson (77) and Ernie Els (76) just made the halfway cut which fell at eight-over 148. Nine players finished under par after the opening round but only five were still in red figures after day two.

Place	Player	Score	To par
T1	(United States) Olin Browne	67-71=138	−2
T1	(South Africa) Retief Goosen	68-70=138	−2
T1	(United States) Jason Gore	71-67=138	−2
T4	(South Korea) K. J. Choi	69-70=139	−1
T4	(Australia) Mark Hensby	71-68=139	−1
T6	(New Zealand) Michael Campbell	71-69=140	E
T6	(Spain) Sergio García	71-69=140	E
T6	(Fiji) Vijay Singh	70-70=140	E
T6	(England) Lee Westwood	68-72=140	E
T10	(Australia) Stephen Allan	72-69=141	+1
T10	(Japan) Keiichiro Fukabori	74-67=141	+1
T10	(United States) Jim Furyk	71-70=141	+1
T10	(United States) Brandt Jobe	68-73=141	+1
T10	(United States) Rocco Mediate	67-74=141	+1
T10	(Australia) Adam Scott	70-71=141	+1
T10	(United States) Tiger Woods	70-71=141	+1

Amateurs: Every (+8), Moore (+8), Kuehne (+10), List (+13), Denham (+14), Putnam (+15), Williams (+18), Soero (+20).

=== Third round ===
Saturday, June 18, 2005

Retief Goosen took a three-shot lead after the U.S. Open third round on Saturday. The world number five recovered from a double-bogey six at the 13th with three birdies in the last five holes for 69 and 207 (−3), the only one to end the day in red figures. Tied for second at even-par 210 were Goosen's playing partner Olin Browne and Jason Gore, both carding 72s. Michael Campbell, another qualifier, registered a 71 to share fourth place at one-over 211 with Mark Hensby (72). David Toms, the 2001 PGA champion, was a further shot back after a 70 while Tiger Woods recorded a 72 to finish in a four-way tie for seventh at three over.

Place	Player	Score	To par
1	(South Africa) Retief Goosen	68-70-69=207	−3
T2	(United States) Olin Browne	67-71-72=210	E
T2	(United States) Jason Gore	71-67-72=210	E
T4	(New Zealand) Michael Campbell	71-69-71=211	+1
T4	(Australia) Mark Hensby	71-68-72=211	+1
6	(United States) David Toms	70-72-70=212	+2
T7	(South Korea) K. J. Choi	69-70-74=213	+3
T7	(Sweden) Peter Hedblom	77-66-70=213	+3
T7	(England) Lee Westwood	68-72-73=213	+3
T7	(United States) Tiger Woods	70-71-72=213	+3

=== Final round ===
Sunday, June 19, 2005

Michael Campbell held off a charging Tiger Woods to clinch his only major title by two shots on Sunday. The 36-year-old Campbell, four off the pace overnight, collected four birdies and three bogeys to close with a one-under-par 69, joint best of the day. Woods, who had been chasing his 10th career major, rallied from a bogey-bogey start and reeled off four birdies in the last nine holes to secure second place with a matching 69. He missed an eight-footer (2.5 m) for par on 16 and three-putted for bogey on 17. Sergio García and South Africa's Tim Clark both carded 70 to tie for third at five over, level with Mark Hensby who registered a 74. Retief Goosen, three strokes clear overnight, threw away his chance of a third U.S. Open title by dropping six shots in the first nine holes. Five more bogeys after the turn led to a finishing 81 (+11) and a share of 11th place at eight-over 288. Jason Gore ballooned to a 14-over 84 to tie for 49th while Olin Browne returned an 80 for a share of 23rd. David Toms shot a 77 to finish tied for 15th. Ernie Els fired his lowest score of the week, a level-par 70 earning him a share of 15th at nine-over 289 while Phil Mickelson returned a 74 to finish at 12 over in a tie for 33rd.

Place	Player	Score	To par	Money ($)
1	(New Zealand) Michael Campbell	71-69-71-69=280	E	1,170,000
2	(United States) Tiger Woods	70-71-72-69=282	+2	700,000
T3	(South Africa) Tim Clark	76-69-70-70=285	+5	320,039
T3	(Spain) Sergio García	71-69-75-70=285	+5	320,039
T3	(Australia) Mark Hensby	71-68-72-74=285	+5	320,039
T6	(United States) Davis Love III	77-70-70-69=286	+6	187,813
T6	(United States) Rocco Mediate	67-74-74-71=286	+6	187,813
T6	(Fiji) Vijay Singh	70-70-74-72=286	+6	187,813
T9	(United States) Arron Oberholser	76-67-71-73=287	+7	150,834
T9	(Zimbabwe) Nick Price	72-71-72-72=287	+7	150,834

Amateurs: Matt Every (+11), Ryan Moore (+16)

==== Scorecard ====
Final round

Hole	1	2	3	4	5	6	7	8	9	10	11	12	13	14	15	16	17	18
Par	4	4	4	5	4	3	4	4	3	5	4	4	4	4	3	4	3	4
(New Zealand) Campbell	E	E	E	E	E	E	E	+1	+1	E	E	−1	−1	−1	−1	E	−1	E
(United States) Woods	+4	+5	+5	+4	+4	+4	+3	+3	+4	+3	+2	+2	+2	+2	+1	+2	+3	+2
(South Africa) Clark	+5	+6	+6	+5	+5	+5	+5	+6	+5	+5	+5	+4	+4	+4	+5	+4	+5	+5
(Spain) García	+5	+5	+5	+6	+6	+7	+6	+5	+5	+5	+5	+5	+5	+5	+6	+5	+5	+5
(Australia) Hensby	+1	+2	+2	+1	+2	+2	+3	+3	+4	+4	+3	+4	+4	+5	+5	+5	+5	+5
(South Africa) Goosen	−3	−1	E	E	+1	+2	+2	+2	+3	+3	+3	+4	+5	+6	+7	+8	+8	+8
(United States) Browne	+1	+2	+2	+3	+4	+5	+5	+5	+6	+7	+7	+7	+8	+8	+8	+10	+10	+10
(United States) Gore	E	+1	+3	+3	+2	+2	+2	+3	+5	+6	+6	+9	+9	+10	+11	+12	+12	+14

Cumulative tournament scores, relative to par

Birdie	Bogey	Double bogey	Triple bogey+
