= Korn Ferry Challenge =

Tournament information
- Location: Ponte Vedra Beach, Florida
- Established: 2020
- Courses: TPC Sawgrass (Dye's Valley Course)
- Par: 70
- Length: 6,847 yards (6,261 m)
- Tour: Korn Ferry Tour
- Format: Stroke play
- Prize fund: US$600,000
- Month played: June
- Final year: 2020

Tournament record score
- Aggregate: 268 Luke List (2020)
- To par: −12 as above

Final champion
- (United States) Luke List

Location map
- Location in the United States Location in Florida

The Korn Ferry Challenge at TPC Sawgrass was a golf tournament on the Korn Ferry Tour. The tournament was one of several added to the Korn Ferry Tour schedule as part of adjustments due to the COVID-19 pandemic and was the first event played after the tour took a three-month hiatus due to the pandemic. It was played in June 2020 on the Dye's Valley Course at TPC Sawgrass in Ponte Vedra Beach, Florida; the course had previously hosted the Winn-Dixie Jacksonville Open from 2010 to 2012 and the Web.com Tour Championship from 2013 to 2015. Luke List won the tournament by one stroke over Joseph Bramlett and Shad Tuten.

== Winners ==
Year	Winner	Score	To par	Margin of victory	Runners-up
2020	(United States) Luke List	268	−12	1 stroke	(United States) Joseph Bramlett (United States) Shad Tuten
