= Abama Open de Canarias =

Golf tournament

Tournament information
- Location: Tenerife, Spain
- Established: 2005
- Course: Abama Golf Club
- Par: 71
- Length: 6,857 yards (6,270 m)
- Tours: European Tour; Challenge Tour
- Format: Strokeplay
- Prize fund: €450,000
- Month played: October
- Final year: 2005

Tournament record score
- Aggregate: 274 John Bickerton (2005)
- To par: −10 as above

Final champion
- (England) John Bickerton
- Location in the Canary Islands Location in Tenerife

The Abama Open de Canarias was a golf tournament on the European and Challenge Tours which was only played in 2005, and was last of four dual ranking events that year. It was held at the Abama Golf Club in Tenerife, Spain, during the same week in October as the WGC-American Express Championship.

England's John Bickerton won the event, his first win on the European Tour, and collected the €75,000 (£51,104) first prize. The total prize fund was towards the lower end of the scale on the European Tour, at €450,000, but was the third richest tournament on the Challenge Tour that season.

The European Tour had previously visited the Canary Islands between 2002 and 2004 for the Canarias Open de España, the Turespana Masters Open de Canarias in 1997, and for the Turespana Open De Canaria, originally the Tenerife Open, from 1989 to 1995.

== Winners ==
Year	Tours (Note: CHA − Challenge Tour; EUR − European Tour.)	Winner	Score	To par	Margin of victory	Runners-up	Ref.
2005	CHA, EUR	(England) John Bickerton	274	−10	5 strokes	(South Africa) Michael Kirk (England) Stuart Little	
