= Michael Ruiz =

Gibraltarian footballer

Personal information
- Full name: Michael Francis Ruiz
- Date of birth: 7 December 2000 (age 25)
- Place of birth: Gibraltar
- Height: 1.77 m (5 ft 10 in)
- Positions: Forward; winger

Team information
- Current team: Lynx
- Number: 7

Youth career
- –2019: Lincoln Red Imps

Senior career*
| Years | Team | Apps | (Gls) |
| 2015–2016 | Red Imps | 10 | (2) |
| 2017–2019 | Lincoln Red Imps | 2 | (1) |
| 2019–2020 | Glacis United | 9 | (2) |
| 2020– | Lynx | 122 | (8) |

International career^{‡}
- Gibraltar U16
| 2017 | Gibraltar U17 | 1 | (0) |
| 2019–2022 | Gibraltar U21 | 10 | (0) |
| 2024– | Gibraltar | 1 | (0) |
- * Club domestic league appearances and goals as of 19 September 2026 ‡ National team caps and goals as of 21 March 2024

Michael Francis Ruiz (born 7 December 2000) is a Gibraltarian footballer who plays as a forward for Lynx and the Gibraltar national team.

== Club career ==
Ruiz came through the ranks at Lincoln Red Imps, first appearing on the bench as an unused substitute in their 3–0 2017 Rock Cup win against Manchester 62. The following season he scored on his debut, in a 6–0 Gibraltar Premier Division win over Mons Calpe.

In 2019 he joined Glacis United, making his debut on the opening day of the season against Mons Calpe, but moved again in January 2020 to join Lynx before the 2019–20 Gibraltar National League season was abandoned due to the COVID-19 pandemic.

== International career ==
Ruiz first appeared as an unused substitute for Gibraltar in a 4–0 defeat to the Republic of Ireland on 16 October 2023. He made his debut on 21 March 2024, appearing as a substitute in a 1–0 defeat to Lithuania.
