= Volvo Masters =

Tournament information
- Location: Sotogrande, Spain
- Established: 1988
- Course: Valderrama Golf Club
- Par: 71
- Length: 6,952 yards (6,357 m)
- Tour: European Tour
- Format: Stroke play
- Prize fund: €4,000,000
- Month played: October
- Final year: 2008

Tournament record score
- Aggregate: 269 Miguel Ángel Jiménez (1999)
- To par: −19 as above

Final champion
- (Denmark) Søren Kjeldsen
- Location in Spain Location in Andalusia

The Volvo Masters was the concluding official money event of the European Tour season until 2009, when it was replaced by the Dubai World Championship. The event was founded in 1988 and held at Valderrama Golf Club in Andalusia, Spain, except for a five-year period between 1997 and 2001 when Montecastillo Golf Club played host to the tournament.

The tournament reverted to its original name of "Volvo Masters" in 2005, having been known as the "Volvo Masters Andalucia" between 2000 and 2003 for sponsorship reasons. The prize money for the inaugural event was £351,690, and by 2008, this had increased to over €4 million, making it one of the richest events on the tour. The field consists of the top 60 leading money winners on the European Tour, and from 2005, an invitation has also been issued to the previous years winner regardless of their standing on the money list.

Prior to 2007, the Volvo Masters was held one week before The Tour Championship to allow golfers who are members of both the European and PGA Tours to participate, but this changed after the PGA Tour rescheduled their event to mid-September.

Following a one-year absence from the calendar, Valderama returned to the European Tour schedule in 2010 with the Andalucía Valderrama Masters under the sponsorship of Turismo Andaluz (Andalucia Government Tourism Organization).

== Winners ==
European Tour (Tour Championship)	1988–2008

#	Year	Winner	Score	To par	Margin of victory	Runner(s)-up
Volvo Masters
21st	2008	(Denmark) Søren Kjeldsen	276	−8	2 strokes	(Germany) Martin Kaymer (England) Anthony Wall
20th	2007	(England) Justin Rose	283	−1	Playoff	(England) Simon Dyson (Denmark) Søren Kjeldsen
19th	2006	(India) Jeev Milkha Singh	282	−2	1 stroke	(England) Luke Donald (Spain) Sergio García (Republic of Ireland) Pádraig Harrington
18th	2005	(Republic of Ireland) Paul McGinley	274	−10	2 strokes	(Spain) Sergio García
Volvo Masters Andalucía
17th	2004	(England) Ian Poulter	277	−7	Playoff	(Spain) Sergio García
16th	2003	(Sweden) Freddie Jacobson	276	−12	Playoff	(Spain) Carlos Rodiles
15th	2002	(Germany) Bernhard Langer (2) (Scotland) Colin Montgomerie (2)	281	−3	Title shared (Note: Title shared when darkness ended play with Langer and Montgomerie still tied after two holes of a sudden-death playoff.)	
14th	2001	(Republic of Ireland) Pádraig Harrington	204 (Note: Shortened to 54 holes due to weather.)	−12	1 stroke	(Republic of Ireland) Paul McGinley
Volvo Masters
13th	2000	(Sweden) Pierre Fulke	272	−16	1 stroke	(Northern Ireland) Darren Clarke
12th	1999	(Spain) Miguel Ángel Jiménez	269	−19	2 strokes	(South Africa) Retief Goosen (Republic of Ireland) Pádraig Harrington (Germany) Bernhard Langer
11th	1998	(Northern Ireland) Darren Clarke	271	−17	2 strokes	(Scotland) Andrew Coltart
10th	1997	(England) Lee Westwood	200	−16	3 strokes	(Republic of Ireland) Pádraig Harrington
9th	1996	(Zimbabwe) Mark McNulty	276	−8	7 strokes	(Argentina) José Cóceres (Scotland) Sam Torrance (South Africa) Wayne Westner (England) Lee Westwood
8th	1995	(Germany) Alex Čejka	282	−2	2 strokes	(Scotland) Colin Montgomerie
7th	1994	(Germany) Bernhard Langer	276	−8	1 stroke	(Spain) Seve Ballesteros (Fiji) Vijay Singh
6th	1993	(Scotland) Colin Montgomerie	274	−10	1 stroke	(Northern Ireland) Darren Clarke
5th	1992	(Scotland) Sandy Lyle	287	+3	Playoff	(Scotland) Colin Montgomerie
4th	1991	(Australia) Rodger Davis	280	−4	1 stroke	(England) Nick Faldo
3rd	1990	(Australia) Mike Harwood	286	+2	1 stroke	(England) Steven Richardson (Scotland) Sam Torrance
2nd	1989	(Northern Ireland) Ronan Rafferty	282	−6	1 stroke	(England) Nick Faldo
1st	1988	(England) Nick Faldo	284	−4	2 strokes	(Spain) Seve Ballesteros
