= Luke List (golfer) =

American professional golfer (born 1985)

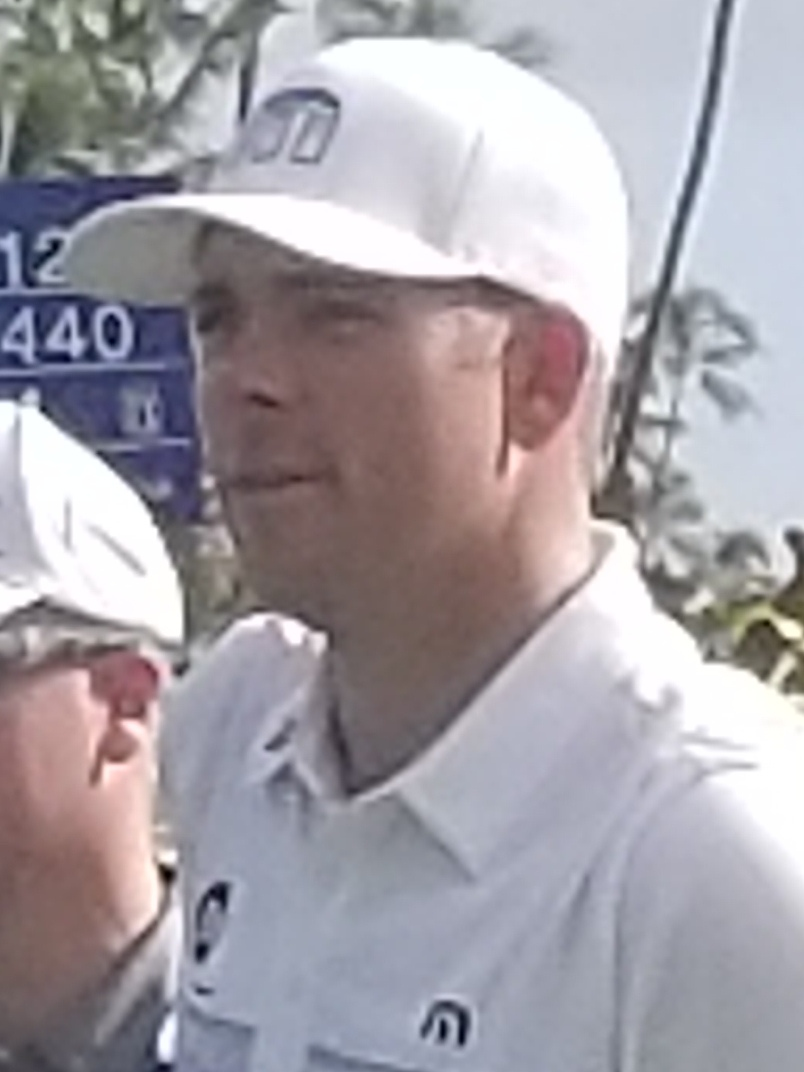
- List in 2018

Personal information
- Full name: Luke Ryan List
- Nationality: United States
- Born: January 14, 1985 (age 41) Seattle, Washington, U.S.
- Height: 6 ft 3 in (1.91 m)
- Weight: 180 lb (82 kg; 13 st)

Career
- Sport: Golf
- College: Vanderbilt University
- Turned professional: 2007
- Current tour: PGA Tour
- Former tour: Web.com Tour
- Professional wins: 4
- Highest ranking: 45 (July 22, 2018) (as of October 25, 2026)

Number of wins by tour
- PGA Tour: 2
- Korn Ferry Tour: 2

Best results in major championships
- Masters Tournament: T33: 2005
- PGA Championship: 6th: 2019
- U.S. Open: CUT: 2003, 2005, 2007, 2018, 2019, 2022, 2023
- The Open Championship: T39: 2018

Luke Ryan List (born January 14, 1985) is an American professional golfer who plays on the PGA Tour.

== Amateur career ==
List was born in Seattle, Washington. He was the runner-up at the 2004 U.S. Amateur to Ryan Moore, finishing 2 down. With his runner-up finish he was extended an invitation to play in the 2005 Masters, in which he finished T33 and recorded an ace during the Par 3 Contest held on Wednesday. He won the Jones Cup Invitational in 2005. He went to high school at Baylor School in Chattanooga, Tennessee. He graduated from Vanderbilt University in 2007 and turned professional.

== Professional career ==
List joined the Nationwide Tour in 2010. He recorded four top-10 finishes during his first two years on Tour. He finished 38th on the money list in 2011 and led the tour in eagles. List won his first professional event on April 29, 2012 at the South Georgia Classic on the Nationwide Tour. The following week, List had a chance to win the Stadion Classic at UGA when he held a one shot lead over Hudson Swafford heading to the final hole of the tournament. But he bogeyed the hole while Swafford birdied it, and List finished in a tie for second.

In 2012 he finished 4th on the Nationwide money list, and was promoted to the PGA Tour. In 2013, he finished 163rd in the FedEx Cup and lost his status. He also finished 1st in driving distance, with an average of 306.3 yards per drive for the season.

In 2014, he finished 119th on the Web.com Tour. However, he still retained status from his 2012 win, and finished 64th in 2015, earning a place in the Web.com Tour Finals. There he finished 22nd (excluding the regular season top 25) to narrowly earn a place on the PGA Tour for 2015–16.

In March 2018, List lost in a sudden-death playoff at the Honda Classic to Justin Thomas. He lost to birdie on the first extra hole, after missing the green in two to the right. This was, however, List's best result to date on the PGA Tour.

List finished T4 in the 2018 Safeway Open to start the 2018–2019 season strongly.

In January 2022, List won the Farmers Insurance Open. List came from behind with a final round six-under par 66. He then had to wait almost two hours for the leaders to finish. He tied Will Zalatoris and the two went to a playoff as the sun was setting. In the playoff, List hit his third shot on the par-5 18th hole to a foot and won the tournament with a birdie. It was List's first PGA Tour victory after 206 PGA Tour starts.

In October 2023, List won the Sanderson Farms Championship. List made a birdie on the first playoff hole to win a five-man playoff over Ludvig Åberg, Ben Griffin, Henrik Norlander and Scott Stallings.

== Personal life ==
List is married to Chloe Kirby List. They have two children and reside in Augusta, Georgia.

== Amateur wins ==
- 2005 Jones Cup Invitational

== Professional wins (4) ==
=== PGA Tour wins (2) ===
No.	Date	Tournament	Winning score	Margin of victory	Runner(s)-up
1	Jan 29, 2022	Farmers Insurance Open	−15 (67-68-72-66=273)	Playoff	(United States) Will Zalatoris
2	Oct 8, 2023	Sanderson Farms Championship	−18 (66-66-68-70=270)	Playoff	(Sweden) Ludvig Åberg, (United States) Ben Griffin, (Sweden) Henrik Norlander, (United States) Scott Stallings

PGA Tour playoff record (2–1)

No.	Year	Tournament	Opponent(s)	Result
1	2018	The Honda Classic	(United States) Justin Thomas	Lost to birdie on first extra hole
2	2022	Farmers Insurance Open	(United States) Will Zalatoris	Won with birdie on first extra hole
3	2023	Sanderson Farms Championship	(Sweden) Ludvig Åberg, (United States) Ben Griffin, (Sweden) Henrik Norlander, (United States) Scott Stallings	Won with birdie on first extra hole

=== Korn Ferry Tour wins (2) ===
No.	Date	Tournament	Winning score	Margin of victory	Runner(s)-up
1	Apr 29, 2012	South Georgia Classic	−16 (67-68-69-68=272)	2 strokes	(United States) Brian Stuard
2	Jun 14, 2020	Korn Ferry Challenge	−12 (66-70-65-67=268)	1 stroke	(United States) Joseph Bramlett, (United States) Shad Tuten

== Results in major championships ==
Results not in chronological order in 2020.

Tournament	2003	2004	2005	2006	2007	2008	2009
Masters Tournament			T33				
U.S. Open	CUT		CUT		CUT		
The Open Championship							
PGA Championship							

Tournament	2010	2011	2012	2013	2014	2015	2016	2017	2018
Masters Tournament									
U.S. Open									CUT
The Open Championship									T39
PGA Championship								CUT	CUT

Tournament	2019	2020	2021	2022	2023	2024
Masters Tournament				CUT		T38
PGA Championship	6	T51		T41		CUT
U.S. Open	CUT			CUT	CUT	
The Open Championship	CUT	NT		CUT		

Top 10
Did not play

CUT = missed the half-way cut
"T" = tied
NT = No tournament due to COVID-19 pandemic

=== Summary ===
Tournament	Wins	2nd	3rd	Top-5	Top-10	Top-25	Events	Cuts made
Masters Tournament	0	0	0	0	0	0	3	2
PGA Championship	0	0	0	0	1	1	6	3
U.S. Open	0	0	0	0	0	0	7	0
The Open Championship	0	0	0	0	0	0	3	1
Totals	0	0	0	0	1	1	19	6

- Most consecutive cuts made – 1 (six times)
- Longest streak of top-10s – 1 (2019 PGA)

== Results in The Players Championship ==
Tournament	2017	2018	2019	2020	2021	2022	2023	2024	2025
The Players Championship	CUT	CUT	T56	C	CUT	WD	CUT	CUT	CUT

CUT = missed the halfway cut
"T" indicates a tie for a place
WD = withdrew
C = Canceled after the first round due to the COVID-19 pandemic

== Results in World Golf Championships ==
Tournament	2018	2019	2020	2021	2022
Championship					
Match Play	T59	T40	NT^{1}		T35
Invitational	T24				
Champions			NT^{1}	NT^{1}	NT^{1}

^{1}Cancelled due to COVID-19 pandemic

Did not play

"T" = Tied
NT = No tournament
Note that the Championship and Invitational were discontinued from 2022.

== U.S. national team appearances ==
Amateur

- Palmer Cup: 2006, 2007 (winners)

== See also ==
- 2012 Web.com Tour graduates
- 2015 Web.com Tour Finals graduates
