= Mark Hensby =

Australian professional golfer

Personal information
- Full name: Mark Adam Hensby
- Nationality: Australia
- Born: 29 June 1971 (age 55) Melbourne, Australia
- Height: 1.73 m (5 ft 8 in)
- Spouse: Kimberly Hensby
- Children: 2

Career
- Sport: Golf
- Turned professional: 1995
- Current tour: PGA Tour Champions
- Former tours: PGA Tour; European Tour; Web.com Tour
- Professional wins: 7
- Highest ranking: 27 (21 August 2005)

Number of wins by tour
- PGA Tour: 1
- European Tour: 1
- Korn Ferry Tour: 3
- PGA Tour Champions: 1
- Other: 1

Best results in major championships
- Masters Tournament: T5: 2005
- PGA Championship: T59: 2005
- U.S. Open: T3: 2005
- The Open Championship: T15: 2005

Mark Adam Hensby (born 29 June 1971) is an Australian professional golfer who currently plays on the PGA Tour Champions. His sole victory on the PGA Tour came at the 2004 John Deere Classic.

== Early life ==
In 1971, Hensby was born in Melbourne, Victoria. Australia. He grew up with his parents and two brothers, Darren and Jason, in Tamworth, New South Wales. When he was young, his parents divorced.

Hensby first played golf when 12 years old and reached handicap 3 within two years. He attended Tamworth High School, leaving at the age of 16 to work as a postie while spending most of his time on the golf course.

== Amateur career ==
In 1994, Hensby moved to the United States. Initially, he stayed with family friends, for a time slept in his car parked at the Cog Hill Golf & Country Club near Chicago, Illinois. In 1994, He won the Illinois State Amateur Championship.

== Professional career ==
In 1994, Hensby turned professional. He played on PGA Tour's developmental tour for a number of years.

Hensby graduated to the PGA Tour for the 2001 season. He gained his place on the elite tour by virtue of his 2nd-place finish on the Buy.com Tour money list in 2000. In his rookie season, Hensby did not earn enough money to retain his card and was forced to return to the second tier for 2002, after failing to regain his place at the end of season qualifying school. In 2003, he picked up his third win on second-tier tour, now named the Nationwide Tour, and finished 7th on the money list, to graduate directly to the PGA Tour for the second time.

2004 was a breakthrough season for Hensby as he sought to establish himself on the PGA Tour. He collected his first win at the 2004 John Deere Classic, where he defeated John E. Morgan in a sudden-death playoff, and also had several other top 10 finishes on his way to 15th place on the end of season money list. The following season, he made an impact in the majors, finishing tied for 5th at the Masters, tied for 3rd in the U.S. Open, and tied for 15th at The Open at St Andrews, Scotland, after being second behind eventual winner Tiger Woods after the first round. In 2005, Hensby made the cut in all four majors. He also won the Scandinavian Masters on the European Tour after beating Henrik Stenson in a playoff on Stenson's home soil in Stockholm, Sweden, after Hensby had birdied the last two holes in regulation to force a playoff. He advanced to a career high 27th in the Official World Golf Ranking during 2005. He was awarded with a spot in the 2005 Presidents Cup International team.

A car accident early in 2006 severely limited Hensby's ability to compete that year, but he came back in 2007 to finish just outside the top 100 on the PGA Tour money list and secure his card for following season. His struggles were not over however and in 2008, he slipped outside the top 150 to lose his fully exempt status.

A series of injuries and three shoulder surgeries, plus two failed attempts at European Tour Q School, halted Hensby's career. He made his first PGA Tour start in two years (and first cut on any major tour since 2011) at the 2015 Barbasol Championship. He was the co-leader at the 36-hole point with rookie Kim Meen-whee. Hensby finished T6, his first PGA Tour top ten finish in seven years.

In December 2017, the PGA Tour suspended Hensby for one year retroactive to 26 October for violating the Tour's anti-doping policy. Hensby spoke out a day afterwards, saying: "Call me stupid but don’t call me a cheater."

In April 2023, Hensby won the Invited Celebrity Classic on PGA Tour Champions in Irving, Texas for his first PGA Tour Champions victory. Hensby won in a playoff. He parred the fourth playoff hole to win the tournament after his opponent Charlie Wi hit his approach into the water.

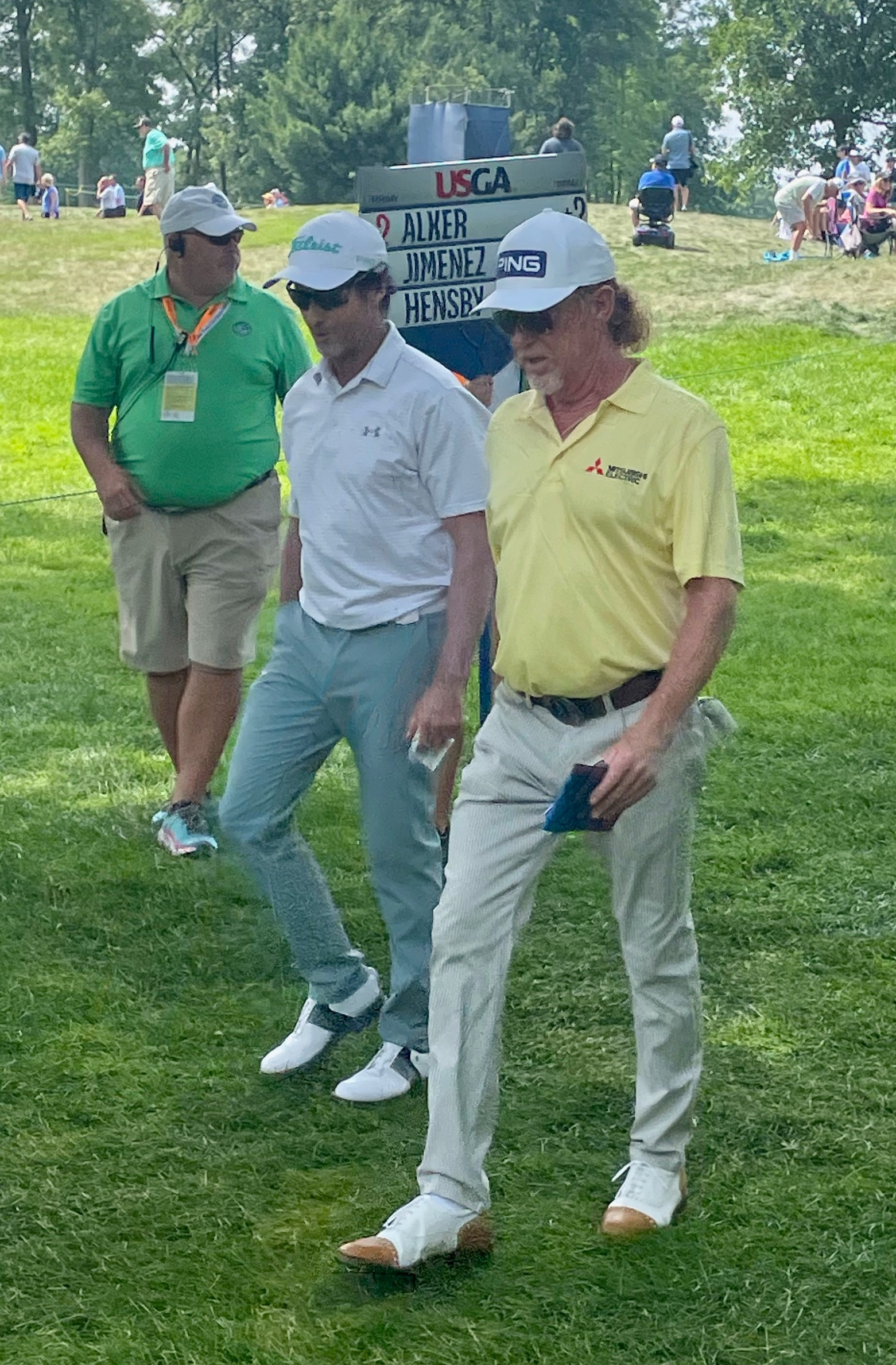
Hensby with Miguel Ángel Jiménez at the 2023 U.S. Senior Open.

== Amateur wins ==
- 1994 Illinois State Amateur Championship

== Professional wins (7) ==
=== PGA Tour wins (1) ===
No.	Date	Tournament	Winning score	Margin of victory	Runner-up
1	11 Jul 2004	John Deere Classic	−16 (68-65-69-66=268)	Playoff	(England) John E. Morgan

PGA Tour playoff record (1–0)

No.	Year	Tournament	Opponent	Result
1	2004	John Deere Classic	(England) John E. Morgan	Won with par on second extra hole

=== European Tour wins (1) ===
No.	Date	Tournament	Winning score	Margin of victory	Runner-up
1	31 Jul 2005	Scandinavian Masters	−22 (65-68-64-65=262)	Playoff	(Sweden) Henrik Stenson

European Tour playoff record (1–0)

No.	Year	Tournament	Opponent	Result
1	2005	Scandinavian Masters	(Sweden) Henrik Stenson	Won with par on second extra hole

=== Nationwide Tour wins (3) ===
No.	Date	Tournament	Winning score	Margin of victory	Runner-up
1	22 Aug 1998	Nike Fort Smith Classic	−20 (65-68-62-65=260)	2 strokes	(United States) Woody Austin
2	6 May 2000	Buy.com Carolina Classic	−18 (64-68-68-66=266)	Playoff	(South Africa) Manny Zerman
3	20 Jul 2003	Henrico County Open	−20 (71-67-67-63=268)	Playoff	(United States) Zach Johnson

Nationwide Tour playoff record (2–1)

No.	Year	Tournament	Opponent	Result
1	2000	Buy.com Carolina Classic	(South Africa) Manny Zerman	Won with par on seventh extra hole
2	2002	Permian Basin Open	(United States) Tag Ridings	Lost to eagle on first extra hole
3	2003	Henrico County Open	(United States) Zach Johnson	Won with birdie on first extra hole

=== Other wins (1) ===
- 1996 Illinois Open Championship

=== PGA Tour Champions wins (1) ===
No.	Date	Tournament	Winning score	Margin of victory	Runner-up
1	23 Apr 2023	Invited Celebrity Classic	−12 (66-65-70=201)	Playoff	(South Korea) Charlie Wi

PGA Tour Champions playoff record (1–0)

No.	Year	Tournament	Opponent	Result
1	2023	Invited Celebrity Classic	(South Korea) Charlie Wi	Won with par on fourth extra hole

== Results in major championships ==
Tournament	2004	2005	2006	2007
Masters Tournament		T5	T22	
U.S. Open		T3	CUT	
The Open Championship		T15	T22	CUT
PGA Championship	T68	T59		

Top 10
Did not play

CUT = missed the half-way cut
"T" = tied

== Results in The Players Championship ==
Tournament	2005	2006	2007	2008
The Players Championship	T73	74		CUT

Did not play

CUT = missed the halfway cut
"T" indicates a tie for a place

== Results in World Golf Championships ==
Tournament	2004	2005	2006	2007
Match Play		R32	R64	
Championship	T11	T56		
Invitational	T65	T58	T54	T67

Did not play

QF, R16, R32, R64 = Round in which player lost in match play
"T" = Tied

== Team appearances ==
- Presidents Cup (International Team): 2005
- WGC-World Cup (representing Australia): 2005, 2006

== See also ==
- 2000 Buy.com Tour graduates
- 2003 Nationwide Tour graduates
