= Henrik Stenson =

Swedish professional golfer (born 1976)

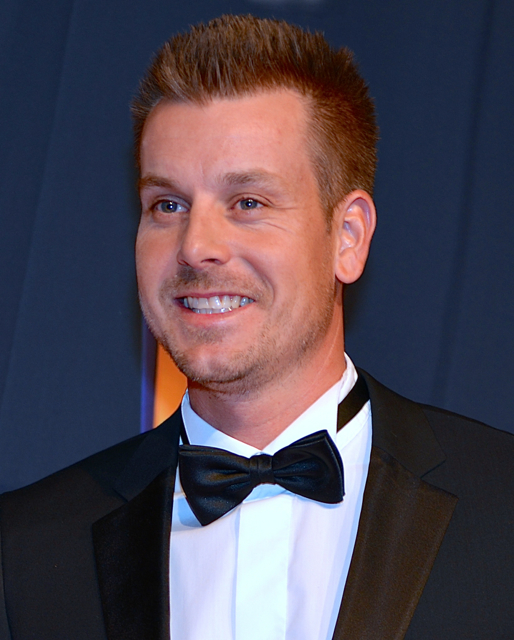
- Stenson in 2014

Personal information
- Full name: Henrik Olof Stenson
- Nickname: The Iceman
- Nationality: Sweden
- Born: 5 April 1976 (age 50) Gothenburg, Sweden
- Height: 6 ft 2 in (1.88 m)
- Weight: 190 lb (86 kg; 14 st)
- Spouse: Emma Löfgren (m. 2007)
- Children: 3

Career
- Sport: Golf
- Turned professional: 1998
- Current tours: PGA Tour Champions; European Senior Tour; European Tour
- Former tours: PGA Tour; LIV Golf; Challenge Tour
- Professional wins: 22
- Highest ranking: 2 (25 May 2014)

Number of wins by tour
- PGA Tour: 6
- European Tour: 11
- Asian Tour: 1
- Sunshine Tour: 2
- Challenge Tour: 3
- LIV Golf: 1
- Other: 2

Best results in major championships (wins: 1)
- Masters Tournament: T5: 2018
- PGA Championship: 3rd/T3: 2013, 2014
- U.S. Open: T4: 2014
- The Open Championship: Won: 2016

Achievements and awards
- Challenge Tour Rankings winner: 2000
- Swedish Golfer of the Year: 2006, 2007, 2013, 2014, 2016
- PGA Tour FedEx Cup winner: 2013
- European Tour Race to Dubai winner: 2013, 2016
- European Tour Golfer of the Year: 2013, 2016
- European Tour Players' Player of the Year: 2013, 2016
Medal record
Representing Sweden
Olympic Games
Silver medal – second place	2016 Rio de Janeiro	Individual

Henrik Olof Stenson (pronounced [ˈhɛ̌nːrɪk ˈstěːnsɔn]; born 5 April 1976) is a Swedish professional golfer who plays on the European Tour and the European Senior Tour. He has won six times on the PGA Tour, including The Players Championship in 2009, and the FedEx Cup in 2013. He won the Open Championship in 2016, his only major.

== Early life ==
Stenson was born in Gothenburg. At age 12, he had his first golf lesson with local pro Richard Bayliss at Gullbringa Gullbringa Golf & Country Club, in Kungälv, north of Gothenburg in September 1988. With parents not playing golf at the time, he first tried the game after following a friend to the course. A natural left-hander, Stenson learned to play golf right-handed.

In 1991, he moved with his parents to Bjärred outside Malmö in southern Sweden and became a member of Barsebäck Golf & Country Club. He reached a handicap of 5 at age 15, scratch at 18 and played in junior and amateur tournaments in Sweden in his teen years.

== Amateur career ==
At age 18, Stenson first represented Sweden in an international championship, at the 1994 European Boys' Team Championship, his team losing in a tight final against England. In 1996, he won the Italian Open Amateur Match-play Championship, beating Robert-Jan Derksen, Netherlands, 5 and 3 in the 36-hole final. In 1998, he played eight tournaments, as an amateur, on the professional Telia Tour, with five top-10 finishes. At the last tournament, the Telia Grand Prix, he led by two strokes with two holes to go, but finished fourth. His achievements during 1998 earned him a place in the Swedish team at the 1998 Eisenhower Trophy in Santiago, Chile, were the Swedish team finished 6th and Stenson was the best Swedish player, finishing 14th individually.

== Professional career ==
=== European Tour ===
In 1998, Stenson turned professional. Two years later topped the money rankings on the second-tier golf tour in Europe, the Challenge Tour. He joined the main European Tour in 2001, and that year, he won the Benson & Hedges International Open for his first European Tour victory. Each year from 2005 to 2008, he finished in the top 10 of the European Tour Order of Merit.

Stenson reached the top 20 of the Official World Golf Ranking in 2006 and the top 10 in 2007. In February 2007, Stenson became the first Swede to win one of the World Golf Championships when he beat Geoff Ogilvy 2&1 in the final of the WGC-Accenture Match Play Championship. This victory took Stenson to the top of the European Order of Merit and to fifth in the world rankings, which was also the highest a male Swedish player had ever been ranked, surpassing Jesper Parnevik's previous record of reaching seventh place in May 2000. In all, Stenson spent over 100 weeks in the top 10 of the rankings between 2007 and 2010. Stenson failed to add to his success over the rest of the season and finished in fourth place on the 2007 European Tour Order of Merit.

Stenson made his Ryder Cup debut in 2006, and after getting a half-point in the foursomes against Stewart Cink and David Toms on the Friday, he holed the winning putt and ensured that Europe won the Ryder Cup for a third consecutive time when he beat Vaughn Taylor 4 & 3 in the Sunday singles. He played again in 2008 at Valhalla, tallying a win, a loss and a draw in the foursomes. However he was not as fortunate as two years before, losing the singles on Sunday 3 & 2 to Kenny Perry.

In March 2009, Stenson created a storm in the media after stripping to his underwear and golf glove in order to play a recovery shot from a muddy water hazard at the first round of the WGC-CA Championship.

=== PGA Tour ===
In May 2009, Stenson won the PGA Tour's flagship event, The Players Championship, with a dominating final round score of 66 to finish four ahead of Ian Poulter. The win was his first American stroke play victory. This win again brought him to fifth in the Official World Golf Ranking. The following week he moved up to fourth without playing. Stenson focused on the PGA Tour for most of the remainder of his career.

Stenson faltered after reaching a career OWGR high. He struggled during most of the 2011 season, when he made 9 of 15 cuts but had no top-10 finishes. His world ranking fell to 230 at the beginning of 2012. On 5 April 2012, Stenson led during the first round of the Masters Tournament with two eagles on the front nine to lead at 6-under-par until the 18th hole. He scored a quadruple-bogey on the par-4 18th hole, tying the Masters' record for the highest score ever on that hole.

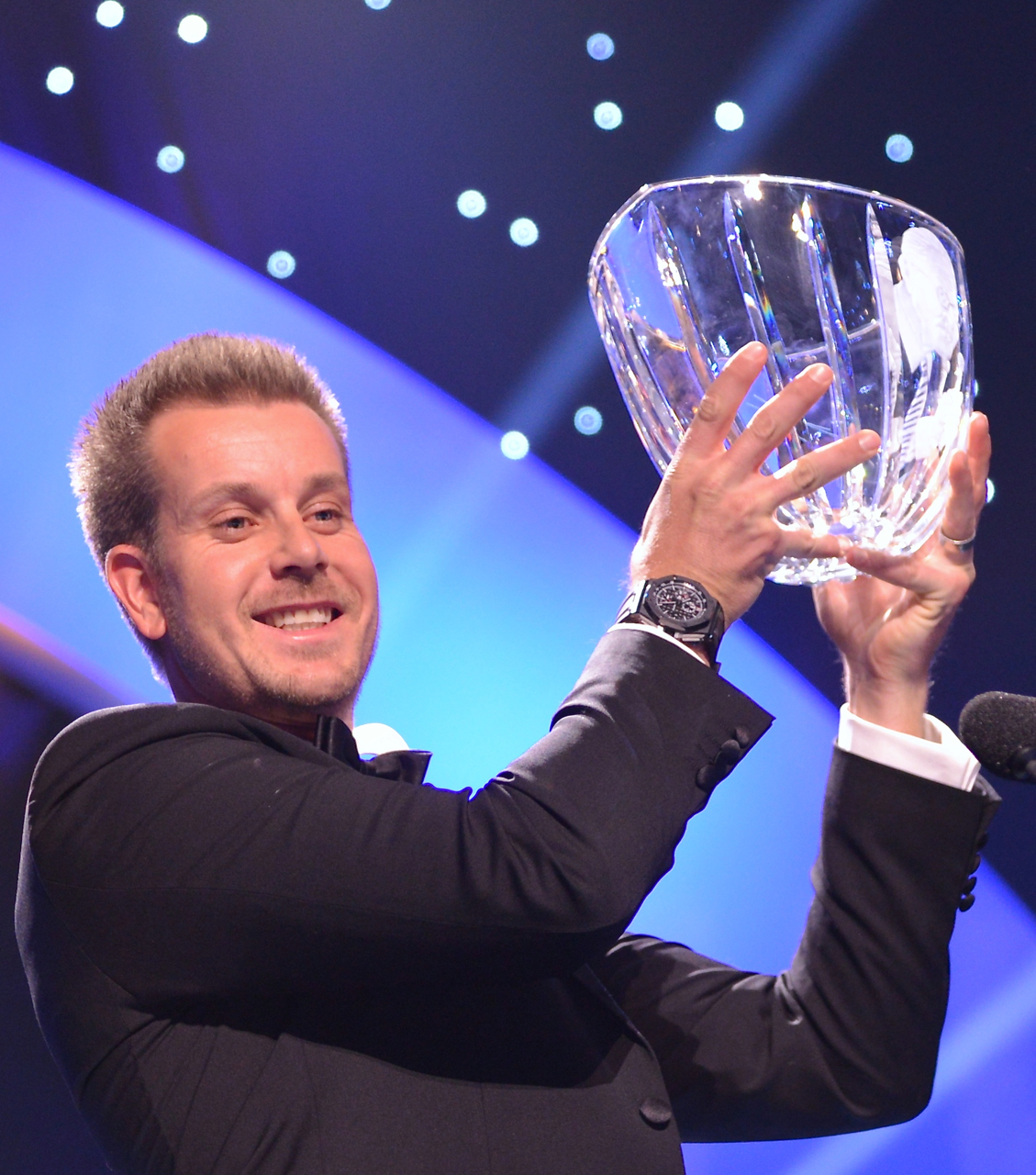
Stenson won the Jerring Award for his performance in the 2013 season.

In 2013, a resurgent Stenson had a watershed season, scoring a number of victories and high-place finishes while cementing a reputation as one of golf's best ball-strikers. In the 2013 Open Championship at Muirfield, Stenson finished as the runner-up, three strokes behind Phil Mickelson, with a total of 284 (E) for the tournament. He shot a final round of 70 and held the lead for brief moments during the round, but was beaten by Mickelson's four birdie finish. This was Stenson's best performance in a major championship, bettering his two previous T3 finishes at the same championship. Stenson moved back inside the world's top 20 with this result. Stenson finished runner-up again the following month at the WGC-Bridgestone Invitational behind Tiger Woods. He moved up to 11th in the world rankings after that result.

In the year's next major championship, the 2013 PGA Championship, Stenson contended again on Sunday, teeing off in the penultimate group, with fellow country-man Jonas Blixt, two strokes behind the leader Jim Furyk. Despite an eagle on the par-5 fourth hole that moved him to within one stroke of the leaders, Stenson was never quite able to build any momentum in an even-par round that included four bogeys. He finished alone in third place, three strokes behind the champion Jason Dufner. Stenson moved up one place in the world rankings to move back inside the world's top ten. Stenson's good form continued into the 2013 FedEx Cup Playoffs, when he won the Deutsche Bank Championship by two strokes over runner-up, Steve Stricker. It was the Swede's first PGA Tour victory in over three years. He tied the tournament record of −22 en route to his third career PGA Tour win. The win vaulted him into first place in the FedEx Cup standings just ahead of Tiger Woods. On 22 September 2013, Stenson won The Tour Championship at East Lake Golf Club and the FedEx Cup. He also tied his career best OWGR ranking of 4th.

He then moved up to a career best 3rd in the OWGR ranking on 3 November 2013. He finished the 2013 season ranked first on the PGA Tour in greens in regulation, first in ball striking, second among money leaders, third in total driving, fourth in scoring average, and seventh in driving accuracy percentage.

On 17 November 2013, he won the DP World Tour Championship, Dubai with a record-breaking performance (an aggregate 263 score at 25-under par), thereby also winning the Race to Dubai which he was already leading. Having already won the FedEx Cup Series in September, he thus became the first player to win the FedEx Cup on the PGA Tour and the European Tour's Race to Dubai, and the only player (as of 9/2020) to do so in the same season, a "historic double". Stenson described his feat as a "double-double" because in the process of winning these two seasonal points crowns, he also won the season finales of both tours (the Tour Championship and the DP World Tour Championship, Dubai). He was later named European Tour Golfer of the Year.

In May 2014, Stenson reached a career high ranking of number two in the world, trailing only Adam Scott. On the PGA Tour, Stenson achieved career-best finishes at the Masters (T14) and U.S. Open (T4) while tying a career-best finish at the PGA Championship (T3). In Europe he won for the second time the DP World Tour Championship in Dubai and recorded 2nd places at the Volvo World Match Play Championship and BMW International Open, en route to a final 2nd place in the Race to Dubai, behind the winner Rory McIlroy.

In 2015, Stenson did not win any professional tournaments but made the cut in all 16 PGA Tour events he entered. He scored four runner-up finishes, including three over the final month of the season. He finished as the overall runner-up for the FedEx Cup. On the European Tour he registered a runner-up finish at the BMW International Open, just as he did in 2014.

At the 2016 U.S. Open, on Saturday morning Stenson failed to show up at Oakmont to complete his second round, where he was going to miss the cut. The USGA said Stenson did not give a reason for his withdrawal, but he later confirmed on Twitter that he had "minor neck and knee issues".

A week later, he became the fourth two-time winner of the BMW International Open and the first to win the event at two different locations (at the Golfclub München Eichenried in 2006; at the Golf Club Gut Lärchenhof in 2016). The 2016 win at the tournament marked his 10th career win on the European Tour.

Stenson won the 2016 Open Championship at Royal Troon for his first major title. Before this win, he had achieved eight top 6-finishes in majors, without a win. He held the 54-hole lead going into the final round with a margin of one stroke over Phil Mickelson. The pair played together during the third round and finished it by being six and five shots ahead of the field respectively, setting up a final head-to-head duel on Sunday. Stenson shot a 63 in the final round to tie Johnny Miller for the best ever final round of a major winner. His overall score of 264 set a record for the lowest score in any major championship. Stenson finished three shots ahead of Mickelson and 14 shots ahead of third-place finisher J. B. Holmes. Stenson became the first male Swede to win a major.

In August, Stenson represented Sweden at the 2016 Summer Olympics, where he won the silver medal; entering the final hole of the competition he was level with the eventual winner Justin Rose, but bogeyed the last hole while Rose made his birdie putt to win by two strokes. Had Stenson won, he would have claimed victories on all six continents on which golf is played, a feat Rose with the Olympic win, joined Hall of Fame members Gary Player, David Graham, Hale Irwin and Bernhard Langer.

Stenson won an automatic selection for the 2016 Ryder Cup at the Hazeltine National Golf Club in Chaska, Minnesota. In the competition he earned 2 points for Europe in 5 matches, winning the Friday fourball with Justin Rose by 5 and 4 against Jordan Spieth and Patrick Reed, and his single match against Spieth by 3 and 2.

In November 2016, Stenson won the Race to Dubai for a second time. Stenson led the European Tour in scoring average (69.14) for the first time in his career in 2016, which he has declared his best overall year to date. In December, Stenson was named European Tour Golfer of the Year for the second time in his career.

In August 2017, Stenson broke the aggregate scoring record at the Wyndham Championship (258), en route to winning the tournament by one stroke over Ollie Schniederjans.

At the 2018 Masters Tournament, Stenson finished tied for fifth place after 4 even rounds of 69, 70, 70 and 70 with total score −9. This result meant that he has managed to finish in the top 5 at all four major championships in his career. He also finished tied for sixth at the U.S. Open. He did not win any tournaments in an otherwise up-and-down year in which he faced several nagging injuries. However, Stenson rebounded with one of the finest performances of his career at the 2018 Ryder Cup. He went 3–0–0 in his matches to join Francesco Molinari as the only players in the combined 24-man field to finish the event undefeated and untied. In the Sunday singles matches of the event, Stenson defeated Bubba Watson 5 & 4 with six birdies and no bogey through fourteen holes, and tied Tony Finau with best score relative to par at 6-under.

Being plagued by elbow injury during the 2018 season, Stenson underwent a minor procedure on his elbow, causing him to miss WGC-HSBC Champions. In 2018, he managed to lead the PGA Tour in both driving accuracy and greens in regulation. It was for the first time someone has led the PGA Tour in both these stats since Calvin Peete did it for three straight seasons in 1981, 1982 and 1983.

In December 2019, Stenson won the Hero World Challenge by one stroke over Jon Rahm. It was his first tournament win in more than two years.

In June, 2022, he finished tied-second and tied best male player at the Volvo Car Scandinavian Mixed, a mixed tournament, co-sanctioned by the European Tour and Ladies European Tour, at Halmstad GC, Sweden, with men and women playing from different tees, nine strokes behind winner Linn Grant, who became the first female winner on the European Tour. The tournament was hosted by Stenson and Annika Sörenstam.

=== Removed from Ryder Cup captaincy ===
On 15 March, 2022, Stenson was announced as the 2023 European Ryder Cup captain. In July, it was confirmed that Stenson had been removed from his position as European Ryder Cup captain, due to his imminent signing with LIV Golf. Stenson would have been the first Swedish Ryder Cup captain and became the first appointed captain removed from his position before entering the match.

=== LIV Golf ===
In his first appearance in the LIV Golf Invitational Series at Bedminster in July 2022, Stenson won by two strokes from Dustin Johnson and Matthew Wolff.

On 22 September 2022, the Swedish Golf Federation announced it was ending its partnership with Henrik Stenson, because of his relations with LIV Golf.

In May, 2023, it was announced that Stenson had resigned his membership of the European Tour, having been subject to multiple fines and suspension from the tour for playing without a conflicting event release.

Despite being a co-captain of team Majesticks GC, Stenson was forced to leave LIV Golf after finishing 49th on the 2025 LIV Golf League. He settled his fines to the European Tour, and made his first appearance at the 2026 Danish Golf Championship.

=== Champions Tour ===
Stenson turned 50 in 2026 and made his senior debut in the Senior PGA Championship at The Concession. He finished top-15 at the U.S. Senior Open and the 2026 Senior Open Championship at Gleneagles, Scotland. He joined the PGA Tour Champions in August, after his one-year LIV-related suspension lapsed, and was runner-up at the PURE Insurance Championship at Pebble Beach Golf Links, two strokes behind Zach Johnson.

== Awards and honors ==
- In 2005, Stenson received Elit Sign number 130 by the Swedish Golf Federation based on world ranking achievements.
- In 2007, Stenson was awarded honorary member of the PGA of Sweden.
- In January 2014, Stenson was voted winner of the Jerring Award, by the radio audience of Sveriges Radio, as the best performing Swedish athlete of 2013.
- He was named Swedish Golfer of the Year five times: 2006, 2007, 2013, 2014, and 2016
- In November 2016, Stenson was awarded the Svenska Dagbladet Gold Medal, for the most significant Swedish sports achievement of the year.
- In 2022, Stenson was elected, as its fifth inductee, decided by the board of the Swedish Golf Federation, into the Swedish Golf Hall of Fame, inaugurated the same year.

== Personal life ==
Stenson married fellow Swede Emma Löfgren in Dubai ten years after meeting her at the University of South Carolina. In July 2007, his wife gave birth to the couple's first child, a daughter. In 2010, the couple had a son. They live close to Lake Nona Golf & Country Club in Orlando, Florida. Emma Löfgren's sister Sarah Skönby, has worked as Stenson's manager since 2008. In 2014, Stenson announced that he had invested in PGA Sweden National, his first venture in golf course ownership.

== Amateur wins ==
- 1996 Italian Open Amateur Championship

== Professional wins (22) ==
=== PGA Tour wins (6) ===
Legend
Major championships (1)
Players Championships (1)
World Golf Championships (1)
FedEx Cup playoff events (2)
Other PGA Tour (1)

No.	Date	Tournament	Winning score	To par	Margin of victory	Runner(s)-up
1	25 Feb 2007	WGC-Accenture Match Play Championship	2 and 1			(Australia) Geoff Ogilvy
2	10 May 2009	The Players Championship	68-69-73-66=276	−12	4 strokes	(England) Ian Poulter
3	2 Sep 2013	Deutsche Bank Championship	67-63-66-66=262	−22	2 strokes	(United States) Steve Stricker
4	22 Sep 2013	Tour Championship	64-66-69-68=267	−13	3 strokes	(United States) Jordan Spieth, (United States) Steve Stricker
5	17 Jul 2016	The Open Championship	68-65-68-63=264	−20	3 strokes	(United States) Phil Mickelson
6	20 Aug 2017	Wyndham Championship	62-66-66-64=258	−22	1 stroke	(United States) Ollie Schniederjans

=== European Tour wins (11) ===
Legend
Major championships (1)
World Golf Championships (1)
Race to Dubai finals series (2)
Other European Tour (7)

No.	Date	Tournament	Winning score	To par	Margin of victory	Runner(s)-up
1	13 May 2001	Benson & Hedges International Open	66-68-71-70=275	−13	3 strokes	(Argentina) Ángel Cabrera, (Republic of Ireland) Paul McGinley
2	26 Sep 2004	The Heritage	69-67-67-66=269	−19	4 strokes	(Spain) Carlos Rodiles
3	29 Jan 2006	Commercialbank Qatar Masters^{1}	66-68-71-68=273	−15	3 strokes	(England) Paul Broadhurst
4	3 Sep 2006	BMW International Open	71-68-66-68=273	−15	Playoff	(South Africa) Retief Goosen, (Republic of Ireland) Pádraig Harrington
5	4 Feb 2007	Dubai Desert Classic	68-64-69-68=269	−19	1 stroke	(South Africa) Ernie Els
6	25 Feb 2007	WGC-Accenture Match Play Championship	2 and 1			(Australia) Geoff Ogilvy
7	18 Nov 2012	SA Open Championship^{2}	66-65-69-71=271	−17	3 strokes	(South Africa) George Coetzee
8	17 Nov 2013	DP World Tour Championship, Dubai	68-64-67-64=263	−25	6 strokes	(England) Ian Poulter
9	23 Nov 2014	DP World Tour Championship, Dubai (2)	68-66-68-70=272	−16	2 strokes	(France) Victor Dubuisson, (Northern Ireland) Rory McIlroy, (England) Justin Rose
10	26 Jun 2016	BMW International Open (2)	68-65-67-71=271	−17	3 strokes	(South Africa) Darren Fichardt, (Denmark) Thorbjørn Olesen
11	17 Jul 2016	The Open Championship	68-65-68-63=264	−20	3 strokes	(United States) Phil Mickelson

^{1}Co-sanctioned by the Asian Tour
^{2}Co-sanctioned by the Sunshine Tour

European Tour playoff record (1–3)

No.	Year	Tournament	Opponent(s)	Result
1	2005	Scandinavian Masters	(Australia) Mark Hensby	Lost to par on second extra hole
2	2006	BMW Asian Open	(Spain) Gonzalo Fernández-Castaño	Lost to birdie on first extra hole
3	2006	BMW International Open	(South Africa) Retief Goosen, (Republic of Ireland) Pádraig Harrington	Won with eagle on first extra hole
4	2014	BMW International Open	(Spain) Rafa Cabrera-Bello, (France) Grégory Havret, (Paraguay) Fabrizio Zanotti	Zanotti won with par on fifth extra hole Cabrera-Bello eliminated by par on fourth hole Havret eliminated by birdie on second hole

=== Sunshine Tour wins (2) ===
Legend
Flagship events (1)
Other Sunshine Tour (1)

No.	Date	Tournament	Winning score	Margin of victory	Runner-up
1	7 Dec 2008	Nedbank Golf Challenge	−21 (63-71-65-68=267)	9 strokes	(United States) Kenny Perry
2	18 Nov 2012	SA Open Championship^{1}	−17 (66-65-69-71=271)	3 strokes	(South Africa) George Coetzee

^{1}Co-sanctioned by the European Tour

Sunshine Tour playoff record (0–1)

No.	Year	Tournament	Opponent	Result
1	2009	Nedbank Golf Challenge	(Australia) Robert Allenby	Lost to par on third extra hole

=== Challenge Tour wins (3) ===
Legend
Tour Championships (1)
Other Challenge Tour (2)

No.	Date	Tournament	Winning score	Margin of victory	Runners-up
1	25 Jun 2000	DEXIA-BIL Luxembourg Open	−18 (63-68-69-70=270)	Playoff	(Belgium) Nicolas Colsaerts (a), (Denmark) Nils Roerbaek-Petersen
2	17 Sep 2000	Gula Sidorna Grand Prix	−7 (66-69-71-71=277)	3 strokes	(Netherlands) Robert-Jan Derksen, (England) Kenneth Ferrie
3	5 Nov 2000	Cuba Challenge Tour Grand Final	−18 (69-67-65-69=270)	5 strokes	(Sweden) Mikael Lundberg, (England) Andrew Raitt, (Italy) Michele Reale

Challenge Tour playoff record (1–1)

No.	Year	Tournament	Opponent(s)	Result
1	2000	Costa Blanca Challenge	(Sweden) Johan Ryström	Lost to birdie on first extra hole
2	2000	DEXIA-BIL Luxembourg Open	(Belgium) Nicolas Colsaerts (a), (Denmark) Nils Roerbaek-Petersen	Won with birdie on second extra hole

=== LIV Golf Invitational Series wins (1) ===
No.	Date	Tournament	Winning score	Margin of victory	Runners-up
1	31 Jul 2022	LIV Golf Invitational Bedminster	−11 (64-69-69=202)	2 strokes	(United States) Dustin Johnson, (United States) Matthew Wolff

=== Other wins (2) ===
No.	Date	Tournament	Winning score	Margin of victory	Runner(s)-up
1	30 Nov 2008	Omega Mission Hills World Cup (with (Sweden) Robert Karlsson)	−27 (65-67-66-63=261)	3 strokes	Spain − Miguel Ángel Jiménez and Pablo Larrazábal
2	7 Dec 2019	Hero World Challenge	−18 (69-67-68-66=270)	1 stroke	(Spain) Jon Rahm

== Major championships ==
=== Wins (1) ===
Year	Championship	54 holes	Winning score	Margin	Runner-up
2016	The Open Championship	1 shot lead	−20 (68-65-68-63=264)	3 strokes	(United States) Phil Mickelson

=== Results timeline ===
Results not in chronological order in 2020.

Tournament	2001	2002	2003	2004	2005	2006	2007	2008	2009
Masters Tournament						CUT	T17	T17	T38
U.S. Open						T26	CUT	CUT	9
The Open Championship	CUT				T34	T48	CUT	T3	T13
PGA Championship					T47	T14	CUT	T4	T6

Tournament	2010	2011	2012	2013	2014	2015	2016	2017	2018
Masters Tournament	CUT	CUT	T40	T18	T14	T19	T24	CUT	T5
U.S. Open	T29	T23		T21	T4	T27	WD	CUT	T6
The Open Championship	T3	68		2	T39	T40	1	T11	T35
PGA Championship	CUT			3	T3	T25	T7	T13	CUT

Tournament	2019	2020	2021	2022	2023	2024	2025	2026
Masters Tournament	T36	CUT	T38					
PGA Championship	T48	CUT	T64	CUT				
U.S. Open	T9	CUT	CUT					
The Open Championship	T20	NT	CUT	CUT	T13	CUT	T45	CUT

Win
Top 10
Did not play

CUT = missed the halfway cut
WD = withdrew
"T" indicates a tie for a place
NT = no tournament due to COVID-19 pandemic

=== Summary ===
Tournament	Wins	2nd	3rd	Top-5	Top-10	Top-25	Events	Cuts made
Masters Tournament	0	0	0	1	1	7	16	11
PGA Championship	0	0	2	3	5	8	16	11
U.S. Open	0	0	0	1	4	6	15	9
The Open Championship	1	1	2	4	4	8	21	15
Totals	1	1	4	9	14	29	68	46

- Most consecutive cuts made – 16 (2011 U.S. Open – 2016 Masters)
- Longest streak of top-10s – 2 (four times)

== The Players Championship ==
=== Wins (1) ===
Year	Championship	54 holes	Winning score	Margin	Runner-up
2009	The Players Championship	5 shot deficit	−12 (68-69-73-66=276)	4 strokes	(England) Ian Poulter

=== Results timeline ===
Tournament	2006	2007	2008	2009
The Players Championship	T3	T23	T10	1

Tournament	2010	2011	2012	2013	2014	2015	2016	2017	2018	2019
The Players Championship	CUT	CUT	T15	T5	T34	T17	CUT	T16	T23	CUT

Tournament	2020	2021	2022
The Players Championship	C	CUT	WD

Win
Top 10

CUT = missed the halfway cut
"T" indicates a tie for a place
WD = withdrew
C = Cancelled after the first round due to the COVID-19 pandemic

== World Golf Championships ==
=== Wins (1) ===
Year	Championship	54 holes	Winning score	Margin	Runner-up
2007	WGC-Accenture Match Play Championship	n/a	2 and 1		(Australia) Geoff Ogilvy

=== Results timeline ===
Results not in chronological order prior to 2015.

Tournament	2005	2006	2007	2008	2009	2010	2011	2012	2013	2014	2015	2016	2017	2018	2019	2020
Championship	T3	T13	T19	T57	T77	T37				T16	T4	T28	WD		T54	
Match Play		R32	1	3	R64	R64	R64		R64	R32	T34				R16	NT^{1}
Invitational	T13	T31	T41	T16	T29	80			T2	T19	T6		T17	T39	T27	T35
Champions					T40	T13			T31	T24	T11	T2	T2		T20	NT^{1}

^{1}Cancelled due to COVID-19 pandemic

Win
Top 10
Did not play

WD = Withdrew
QF, R16, R32, R64 = Round in which player lost in match play
NT = No tournament
"T" = tied
Note that the HSBC Champions did not become a WGC event until 2009.

== Senior major championships ==
=== Results timeline ===
Tournament	2026
Senior PGA Championship	T47
The Tradition	
U.S. Senior Open	T11
Senior Players Championship	
Senior Open Championship	T14

Did not play

"T" indicates a tie for a place

== PGA Tour career summary ==
Season	Starts	Cuts made	Wins (majors)	2nd	3rd	Top 10	Top 25	Earnings ($)	Money list rank
2001	1	0	0	0	0	0	0	0	n/a
2002	0	0	0	0	0	0	0	0	n/a
2003	0	0	0	0	0	0	0	0	n/a
2004	0	0	0	0	0	0	0	0	n/a
2005	4	4	0	0	1	1	2	53,919	n/a
2006	10	8	0	0	1	1	4	582,303	n/a
2007	15	10	1	0	0	2	6	1,897,554	40
2008	9	8	0	0	2	4	6	1,238,118	n/a
2009	10	9	1	0	1	4	5	2,550,185	n/a
2010	15	9	0	0	1	1	1	683,070	134
2011	15	9	0	0	0	0	2	327,799	166
2012	15	11	0	0	1	1	7	791,107	115
2013	18	16	2	3	1	8	10	6,388,230	2
2013–14	15	14	0	0	1	3	8	1,894,235	49
2014–15	16	16	0	4	0	8	12	4,755,070	9
2015–16	14	10	1 (1)	1	1	4	7	3,397,373	21
2016–17	15	9	1	1	0	3	8	2,769,771	34
2017–18	16	14	0	1	0	5	9	2,680,487	40
2018–19	15	14	0	0	0	3	8	1,397,370	82
2019–20	5	3	0	0	0	0	1	155,111	203
2020–21	18	11	0	0	0	0	3	245,906	189
2021–22*	13	4	0	0	0	0	2	184,439	208
Career*	221	167	6 (1)	10	10	48	98	31,746,140	32

*As of the 31 July 2022.

== Team appearances ==
Amateur

- Jacques Léglise Trophy (representing the Continent of Europe): 1994
- European Boys' Team Championship (representing Sweden): 1994
- European Youths' Team Championship (representing Sweden): 1996
- European Amateur Team Championship (representing Sweden): 1997
- Eisenhower Trophy (representing Sweden): 1998
- St Andrews Trophy (representing the Continent of Europe): 1998 (winners)

Professional

- Seve Trophy (representing Continental Europe): 2005, 2009
- World Cup (representing Sweden): 2005, 2006, 2008 (winners), 2009
- Royal Trophy (representing Europe): 2006 (winners), 2007 (winners), 2010 (winners), 2011 (winners), 2012
- Ryder Cup (representing Europe): 2006 (winners), 2008, 2014 (winners), 2016, 2018 (winners)
- EurAsia Cup (representing Europe): 2018 (winners)

Ryder Cup points record

2006	2008	2010	2012	2014	2016	2018	Total
1.5	1.5	–	–	3	2	3	11

== See also ==
- List of golfers with most European Tour wins

Awards and achievements
Preceded by Sarah Sjöström	Svenska Dagbladet Gold Medal; 2016	Succeeded by Sarah Sjöström
