= Anthony Wall (golfer) =

English golfer

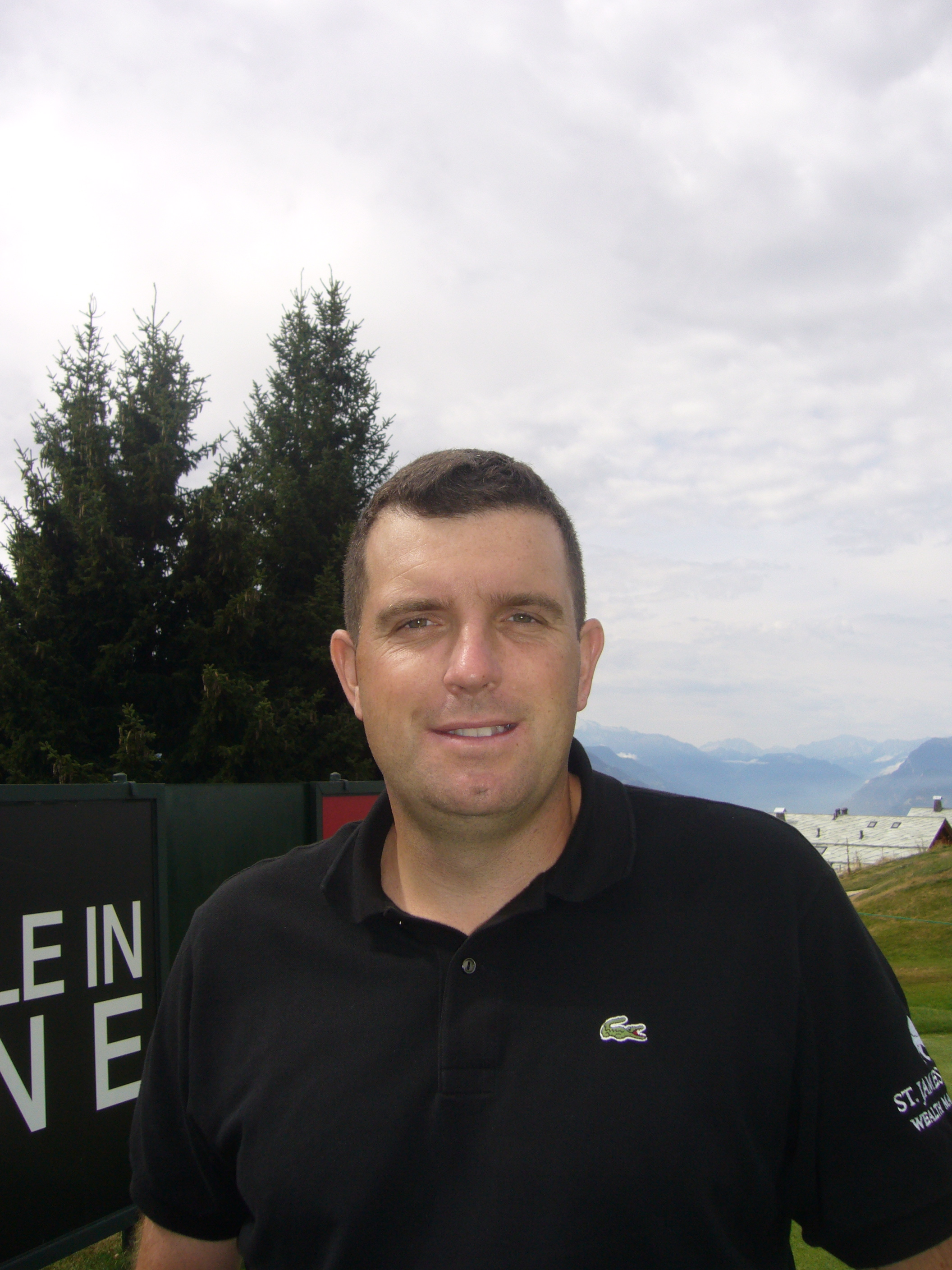
- Wall at the 2009 Omega European Masters

Personal information
- Full name: Anthony David Wall
- Nationality: England
- Born: 29 May 1975 (age 51) London, England
- Height: 6 ft 2 in (1.88 m)
- Weight: 196 lb (89 kg; 14.0 st)

Career
- Sport: Golf
- Turned professional: 1995
- Current tour: European Tour
- Professional wins: 2
- Highest ranking: 59 (31 December 2006)

Number of wins by tour
- European Tour: 2
- Sunshine Tour: 1

Best results in major championships
- Masters Tournament: DNP
- PGA Championship: CUT: 2006, 2009
- U.S. Open: CUT: 2007
- The Open Championship: T11: 2006

Anthony David Wall (born 29 May 1975) is an English professional golfer.

== Career ==
Wall was born in London. He turned professional in 1995 and has played on the European Tour since 1998. He has made the top 100 on the Order of Merit every season since his rookie year. His only European Tour win to date came at the 2000 Alfred Dunhill Championship in South Africa. In 2006 he was the leading British player at The Open Championship, finishing in a tie for eleventh place. Also in 2006 achieved his best year-end ranking on the Order of Merit of 13th. In 2011, Wall was in contention to win his first tour level event in 11 years at the Sicilian Open but hit his approach shot on 17 into the water resulting in a double bogey and missing out by one stroke.

In 2016, Wall won the Paul Lawrie Matchplay, his first victory in over 16 years and second on the European Tour, a Tour record for time between wins.

In May 2018, Wall announced his retirement from professional golf. He is currently one of the rotating on-course commentators for the European Tour world-feed broadcast.

== Amateur wins ==
- 1993 Golf Illustrated Gold Vase

== Professional wins (2) ==
=== European Tour wins (2) ===
No.	Date	Tournament	Winning score	Margin of victory	Runner(s)-up
1	16 Jan 2000	Alfred Dunhill Championship^{1}	−12 (69-67-68=204) (Note: Shortened to 54 holes due to weather.)	2 strokes	(Scotland) Gary Orr, (Wales) Phillip Price
2	7 Aug 2016	Aberdeen Asset Management Paul Lawrie Match Play	1 up		(Sweden) Alex Norén

^{1}Co-sanctioned by the Southern Africa Tour

== Results in major championships ==
Tournament	2003	2004	2005	2006	2007	2008	2009
U.S. Open					CUT		
The Open Championship	T46			T11	CUT	T51	T43
PGA Championship				CUT	WD		CUT

Tournament	2010	2011	2012	2013	2014	2015	2016
U.S. Open							
The Open Championship						T12	CUT
PGA Championship							

Note: Wall never played in the Masters Tournament.

Did not play

CUT = missed the half-way cut
"T" indicates a tie for a place

== Results in World Golf Championships ==
Tournament	2006	2007
Match Play		
Championship	T50	T65
Invitational		

Did not play

"T" = Tied

== Team appearances ==
Amateur

- Jacques Léglise Trophy (representing Great Britain & Ireland): 1993 (winners)

Professional

- Royal Trophy (representing Europe): 2007 (winners)
- Seve Trophy (representing Great Britain & Ireland): 2009 (winners)
