= Søren Hansen =

Danish professional golfer

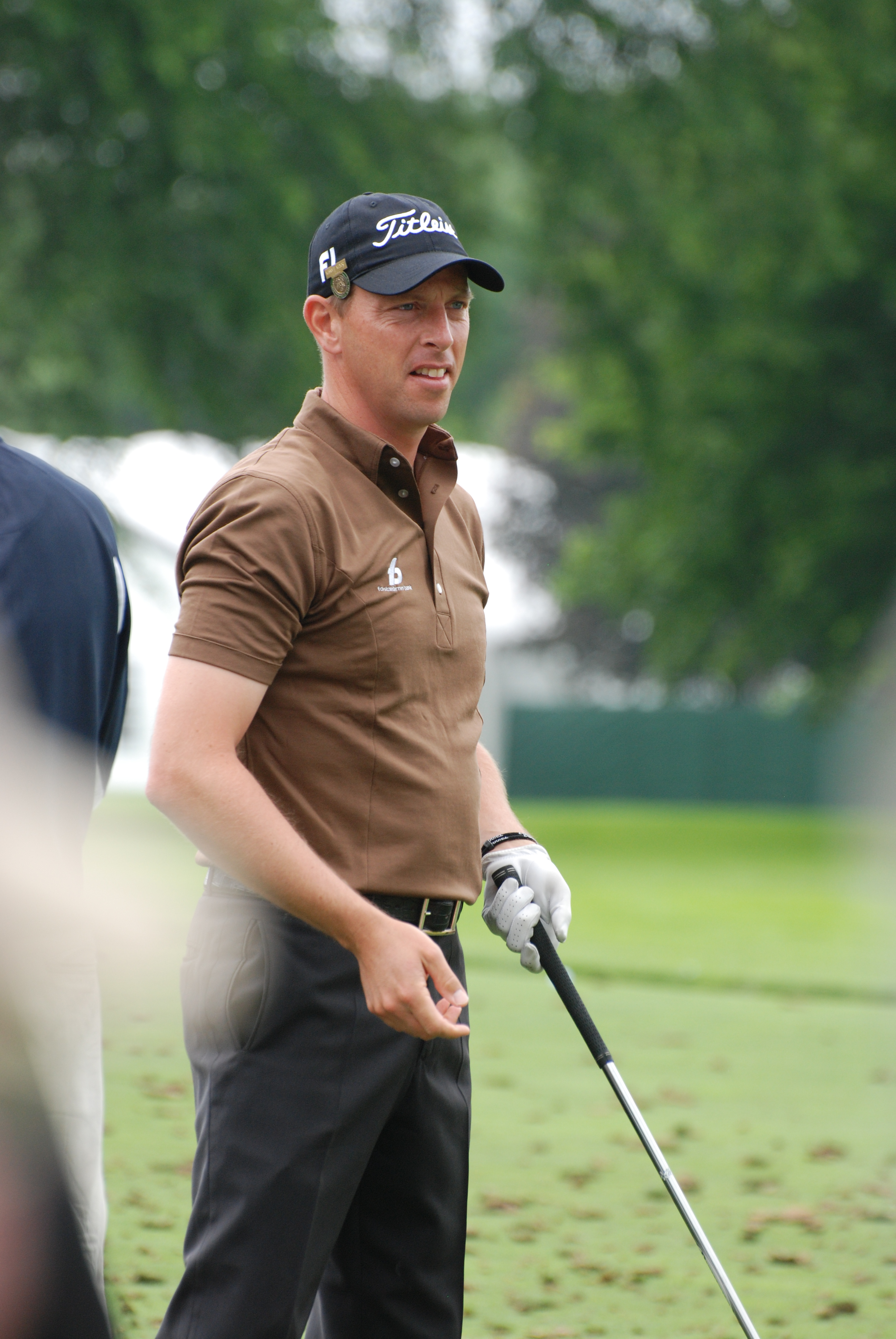
- Hansen at the 2009 U.S. Open

Personal information
- Full name: Søren Hansen
- Nationality: Denmark
- Born: 21 March 1974 (age 52) Copenhagen, Denmark
- Height: 6 ft 0 in (1.83 m)
- Weight: 195 lb (88 kg; 13.9 st)

Career
- Sport: Golf
- Turned professional: 1997
- Former tours: European Tour; Challenge Tour
- Professional wins: 3
- Highest ranking: 39 (6 July 2008)

Number of wins by tour
- European Tour: 2
- Challenge Tour: 1

Best results in major championships
- Masters Tournament: CUT: 2008, 2009, 2010
- PGA Championship: T36: 2009
- U.S. Open: T6: 2009
- The Open Championship: T8: 2002, 2009

Søren Hansen (born 21 March 1974) is a Danish professional golfer.

== Career ==
Hansen was born in Copenhagen, Denmark. He won the 1997 Danish Amateur Stroke Play Championship and turned professional later that year.

Hansen collected his first professional win at the Challenge Tour's 1998 Navision Open Golf Championship in his home country. Since 1999 he has been a member of the European Tour where he has picked up two tournament victories. He won the 2002 Murphy's Irish Open, where he won at the fourth extra hole in a play-off against Richard Bland, Niclas Fasth and Darren Fichardt. He also won the 2007 Mercedes-Benz Championship by a margin of four strokes. His best Order of Merit finish is 8th in 2007. He represented Europe in the 2008 Ryder Cup matches, but he did not win a match, the U.S. was victorious.

In September 2007, he reached the top 50 of the Official World Golf Rankings and became the top-ranked Danish golfer.

Hansen represented Denmark in the World Cup in 1998, 2001, 2002, 2005 and 2007.

On 11 August 2009, Hansen was charged with tax evasion by Danish authorities for allegedly claiming residency of Monaco, while actually living in Denmark. On 19 May 2010, Hansen was fined nearly $1.1 million for tax evasion.

== Amateur wins ==
- 1997 Danish Amateur Stroke Play Championship

== Professional wins (3) ==
=== European Tour wins (2) ===
| No. | Date | Tournament | Winning score | Margin of victory | Runners-up |
|---|---|---|---|---|---|
| 1 | 30 Jun 2002 | Murphy's Irish Open | −14 (69-69-64-68=270) | Playoff | (England) Richard Bland, (Sweden) Niclas Fasth, (South Africa) Darren Fichardt |
| 2 | 16 Sep 2007 | Mercedes-Benz Championship | −17 (65-68-71-67=271) | 4 strokes | (England) Phillip Archer, (Scotland) Alastair Forsyth |

European Tour playoff record (1–0)

| No. | Year | Tournament | Opponents | Result |
|---|---|---|---|---|
| 1 | 2002 | Murphy's Irish Open | (England) Richard Bland, (Sweden) Niclas Fasth, (South Africa) Darren Fichardt | Won with birdie on fourth extra hole Bland eliminated by birdie on second hole |

=== Challenge Tour wins (1) ===
| No. | Date | Tournament | Winning score | Margin of victory | Runners-up |
|---|---|---|---|---|---|
| 1 | 30 Aug 1998 | Navision Open Golf Championship | −10 (71-69-66=206) | Playoff | (Denmark) René Budde, (Scotland) Euan Little |

Challenge Tour playoff record (1–0)

| No. | Year | Tournament | Opponents | Result |
|---|---|---|---|---|
| 1 | 1998 | Navision Open Golf Championship | (Denmark) René Budde, (Scotland) Euan Little | Won with par on first extra hole |

== Playoff record ==
Other playoff record (0–1)

| No. | Year | Tournament | Opponents | Result |
|---|---|---|---|---|
| 1 | 2001 | WGC-World Cup (with (Denmark) Thomas Bjørn) | New Zealand − Michael Campbell and David Smail, South Africa − Retief Goosen and Ernie Els, United States − David Duval and Tiger Woods | South Africa won with par on second extra hole New Zealand and United States eliminated by birdie on first hole |

== Results in major championships ==
| Tournament | 2001 | 2002 | 2003 | 2004 | 2005 | 2006 | 2007 | 2008 | 2009 |
|---|---|---|---|---|---|---|---|---|---|
| Masters Tournament | | | | | | | | CUT | CUT |
| U.S. Open | | | | | | | | T53 | T6 |
| The Open Championship | CUT | T8 | CUT | | T41 | | | T64 | T8 |
| PGA Championship | | T43 | | | CUT | | | CUT | T36 |

| Tournament | 2010 | 2011 | 2012 | 2013 | 2014 | 2015 | 2016 |
|---|---|---|---|---|---|---|---|
| Masters Tournament | CUT | | | | | | |
| U.S. Open | CUT | | | | | | CUT |
| The Open Championship | CUT | | | | | | |
| PGA Championship | CUT | | | | | | |

Top 10
Did not play

CUT = missed the half-way cut
"T" = tied

=== Summary ===
| Tournament | Wins | 2nd | 3rd | Top-5 | Top-10 | Top-25 | Events | Cuts made |
|---|---|---|---|---|---|---|---|---|
| Masters Tournament | 0 | 0 | 0 | 0 | 0 | 0 | 3 | 0 |
| U.S. Open | 0 | 0 | 0 | 0 | 1 | 1 | 4 | 2 |
| The Open Championship | 0 | 0 | 0 | 0 | 2 | 2 | 7 | 4 |
| PGA Championship | 0 | 0 | 0 | 0 | 0 | 0 | 5 | 2 |
| Totals | 0 | 0 | 0 | 0 | 3 | 3 | 19 | 8 |

- Most consecutive cuts made – 3 (2009 U.S. Open – 2009 PGA)
- Longest streak of top-10s – 2 (2009 U.S. Open – 2009 Open Championship)

== Results in The Players Championship ==
| Tournament | 2008 |
|---|---|
| The Players Championship | T42 |

"T" indicates a tie for a place

== Results in World Golf Championships ==
| Tournament | 2002 | 2003 | 2004 | 2005 | 2006 | 2007 | 2008 | 2009 | 2010 |
|---|---|---|---|---|---|---|---|---|---|
| Match Play | | | | | | | R64 | R64 | R64 |
| Championship | T39 | | | | | | T70 | T13 | T18 |
| Invitational | T52 | | | | | | T73 | T60 | 75 |
| Champions | | | | | | | | | |

Did not play

QF, R16, R32, R64 = Round in which player lost in match play
"T" = Tied
Note that the HSBC Champions did not become a WGC event until 2009.

== Team appearances ==
Amateur

- European Youths' Team Championship (representing Denmark): 1990, 1994
- European Amateur Team Championship (representing Denmark): 1995, 1997

Professional

- World Cup (representing Denmark): 1998, 2001, 2002, 2005, 2006, 2007, 2008, 2009
- Seve Trophy (representing Continental Europe): 2007, 2009
- Ryder Cup (representing Europe): 2008
- Royal Trophy (representing Europe): 2009, 2010 (winners)
