= Gonzalo Fernández-Castaño =

Spanish golfer (born 1980)

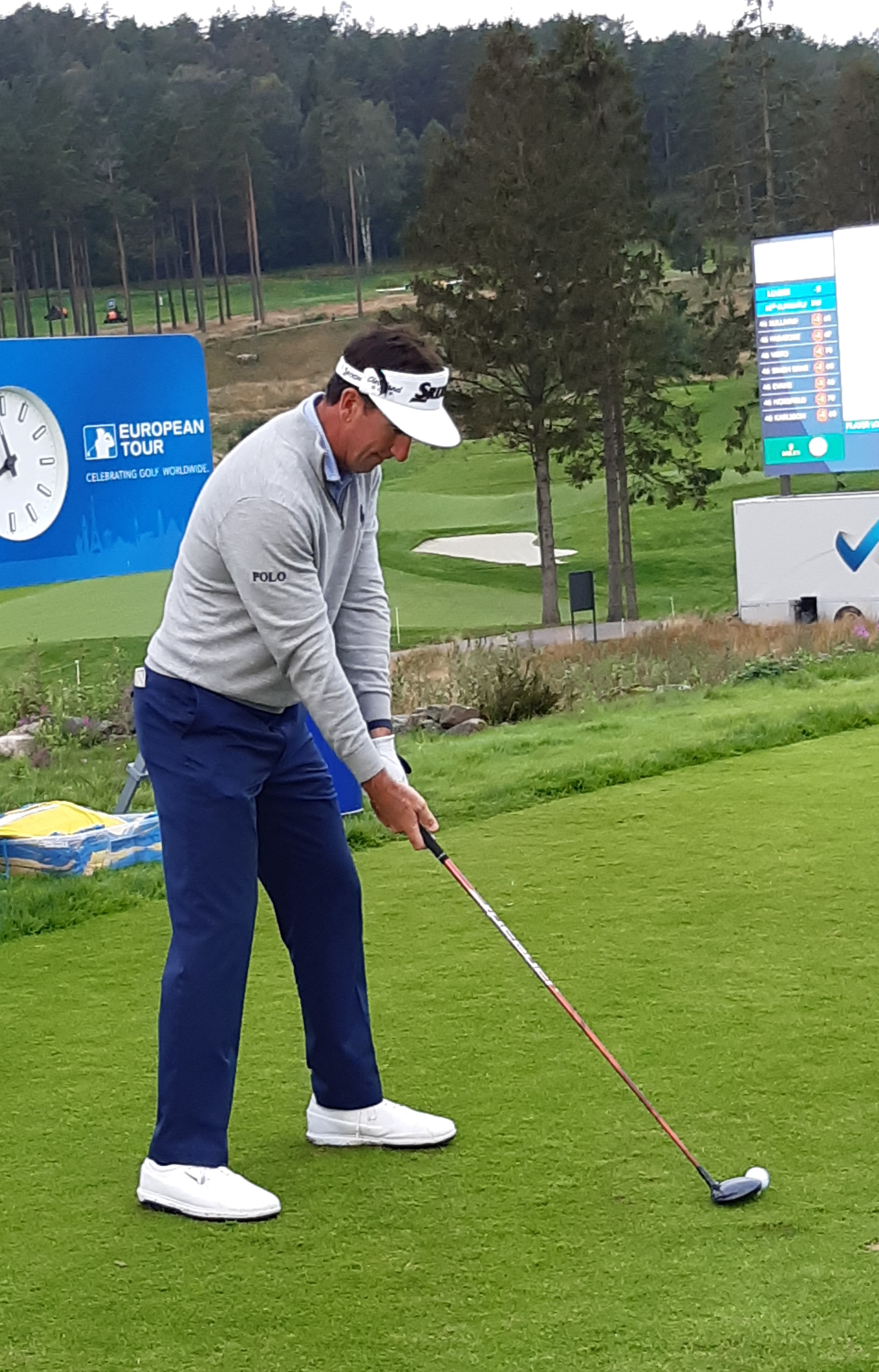
- Fernández-Castaño at the 2019 Scandinavian Invitation

Personal information
- Nickname: Gonzo
- Nationality: Spain
- Born: 13 October 1980 (age 46) Madrid, Spain
- Height: 1.86 m (6 ft 1 in)
- Weight: 85 kg (187 lb; 13.4 st)
- Spouse: Alicia (m. 2006)
- Children: 3

Career
- Sport: Golf
- Turned professional: 2004
- Current tour: European Tour
- Former tours: PGA Tour; Web.com Tour
- Professional wins: 8
- Highest ranking: 27 (24 March 2013)

Number of wins by tour
- European Tour: 7
- Asian Tour: 2
- Other: 1

Best results in major championships
- Masters Tournament: T20: 2013
- PGA Championship: T32: 2009
- U.S. Open: T10: 2013
- The Open Championship: T47: 2009

Achievements and awards
- Sir Henry Cotton Rookie of the Year: 2005

Gonzalo Fernández-Castaño (born 13 October 1980) is a Spanish professional golfer. He has played on the European Tour, winning seven times, and on the PGA Tour.

== Early life ==
Fernández-Castaño was born in Madrid. He started playing golf at the age of three and had a successful amateur career, winning the 2003 Spanish Amateur Open Championship and achieving the first place in the Spanish amateur ranking in the same year. He represented Spain and Europe in several amateur team competitions, and was in the winning European team at the 2003 and 2004 Palmer Cup.

He turned professional at the end of 2004 after completing Stage One of the European Tour Qualifying School, finishing eighth at the Finals at San Roque Golf Club where he secured his card for the 2005 season.

== Professional career ==
In his 2005 rookie season on the Tour, he won the KLM Open and the Sir Henry Cotton Rookie of the Year award. In 2006 he won the BMW Asian Open, which was co-sanctioned by the European Tour and the Asian Tour.

In 2007 he won his third European Tour tournament, the Italian Open. He has finished within the top 60 of the Order of Merit in each of his nine seasons on tour to date. He had one win on tour in 2008 at the Quinn Insurance British Masters.

He finished runner-up at the 2009 Estoril Open de Portugal after losing in a playoff to Michael Hoey. He would finish runner-up next week to Scott Strange at the Volvo China Open. He finished second for the third straight week at the Ballantine's Championship, where he lost to Thongchai Jaidee in a 3-way playoff in extremely tough conditions in Korea. He ended the season ranked 17th on the Race to Dubai.

In May 2009 he reached the top 50 of the Official World Golf Ranking for the first time.

In November 2011, he won the Barclays Singapore Open in a playoff. He had previously missed over six months of the season due to a back injury.

Fernández-Castaño won his sixth career European Tour title in September 2012 at the BMW Italian Open. This was also the second time that he had won at this event. Fernández-Castaño overcame a one shot final round deficit to prevail by two strokes over Garth Mulroy after a final round of 64.

In early 2013, Fernández-Castaño played several events on the PGA Tour, finishing third in the Arnold Palmer Invitational on a sponsor's exemption and reaching the 27th place in the Official World Golf Ranking, his best to date. He earned enough money to be eligible for Special Temporary Membership on the PGA Tour, which he accepted. This allowed him unlimited sponsor exemptions for the remainder of the 2013 season. He also finished 10th in the U.S. Open, and concluded the season with more points than the 125th PGA Tour player to earn a place as a full member for 2014. On the European Tour he won the BMW Masters and finished six times in the top-10, missing only one cut in 21 events; he ended the season ranked 7th on the Race to Dubai, his best ever performance to date.

The following season Fernández-Castaño decided to focus on the PGA Tour, playing most of his events in the United States. His best result and only top-10 of the year was in July at the RBC Canadian Open, where he finished tied for the 4th place.

The 2015 season of the PGA Tour proved to be less successful. He missed 15 cuts in 28 events played, finishing only 165th in the FedEx Cup ranking; between September and October he entered the Web.com Tour Finals in an attempt to save his PGA Tour membership, but failed to make an impact and ultimately lost his tour card.

Without his PGA Tour status, Fernández-Castaño decided to stay in the United States in 2016 and play the Web.com Tour hoping to quickly regain access to the major tour. He played 22 events in the regular season with two top-10 finishes, finishing only 64th. Entering for the second year in a row into the Web.com Tour Finals, he managed this time to graduate to the PGA Tour.

== Amateur wins ==
- 2003 Spanish International Amateur Championship

== Professional wins (8) ==
=== European Tour wins (7) ===
Legend
Race to Dubai finals series (1)
Other European Tour (6)

No.	Date	Tournament	Winning score	Margin of victory	Runner(s)-up
1	12 Jun 2005	KLM Open	−11 (66-70-66-67=269)	2 strokes	(England) Gary Emerson
2	23 Apr 2006	BMW Asian Open^{1}	−7 (71-71-69-70=281)	Playoff	(Sweden) Henrik Stenson
3	6 May 2007	Telecom Italia Open	−16 (67-68-65=200) (Note: Shortened to 54 holes due to weather.)	Playoff	(Austria) Markus Brier
4	28 Sep 2008	Quinn Insurance British Masters	−12 (71-70-68-67=276)	Playoff	(England) Lee Westwood
5	14 Nov 2011	Barclays Singapore Open^{1}	−14 (66-61-72=199)	Playoff	(Philippines) Juvic Pagunsan
6	16 Sep 2012	BMW Italian Open (2)	−24 (68-65-67-64=264)	2 strokes	(South Africa) Garth Mulroy
7	27 Oct 2013	BMW Masters	−11 (71-71-67-68=277)	1 stroke	(Italy) Francesco Molinari, (Thailand) Thongchai Jaidee

^{1}Co-sanctioned by the Asian Tour

European Tour playoff record (4–2)

No.	Year	Tournament	Opponent(s)	Result
1	2006	BMW Asian Open	(Sweden) Henrik Stenson	Won with birdie on first extra hole
2	2007	Telecom Italia Open	(Austria) Markus Brier	Won with birdie on second extra hole
3	2008	Quinn Insurance British Masters	(England) Lee Westwood	Won with par on third extra hole
4	2009	Estoril Open de Portugal	(Northern Ireland) Michael Hoey	Lost to par on third extra hole
5	2009	Ballantine's Championship	(Thailand) Thongchai Jaidee, (South Korea) Kang Sung-hoon	Jaidee won with birdie on first extra hole
6	2011	Barclays Singapore Open	(Philippines) Juvic Pagunsan	Won with birdie on second extra hole

=== Other wins (1) ===
- 2005 Madrid Federation Championship (Peugeot Tour, Spain)

== Results in major championships ==
Results not in chronological order in 2020.

Tournament	2006	2007	2008	2009	2010	2011	2012	2013	2014	2015	2016	2017	2018
Masters Tournament							61	T20	T26				
U.S. Open				CUT			CUT	T10	CUT				
The Open Championship	T48			T47	CUT		T54	T54	CUT				
PGA Championship	CUT			T32	T33		T62	CUT	T58				

Tournament	2019	2020	2021
Masters Tournament			
PGA Championship			
U.S. Open			
The Open Championship		NT	CUT

Top 10
Did not play

CUT = missed the half-way cut
"T" = tied
NT = No tournament due to COVID-19 pandemic

=== Summary ===
Tournament	Wins	2nd	3rd	Top-5	Top-10	Top-25	Events	Cuts made
Masters Tournament	0	0	0	0	0	1	3	3
PGA Championship	0	0	0	0	0	0	6	4
U.S. Open	0	0	0	0	1	1	4	1
The Open Championship	0	0	0	0	0	0	7	4
Totals	0	0	0	0	1	2	20	12

- Most consecutive cuts made – 5 (2012 Open Championship – 2013 Open Championship)
- Longest streak of top-10s – 1

== Results in The Players Championship ==
Tournament	2013	2014	2015
The Players Championship	CUT	T38	CUT

CUT = missed the halfway cut
"T" indicates a tie for a place

== Results in World Golf Championships ==
Tournament	2006	2007	2008	2009	2010	2011	2012	2013	2014
Match Play							R64	R16	R64
Championship					T37		T55	T43	T54
Invitational	75			T70			T55	T38	62
Champions				T45			T28	T39	

Top 10
Did not play

QF, R16, R32, R64 = Round in which player lost in match play
"T" = tied
Note that the HSBC Champions did not become a WGC event until 2009.

== Team appearances ==
Amateur

- European Boys' Team Championship (representing Spain): 1995, 1996 (winners), 1998
- European Amateur Team Championship (representing Spain): 2001, 2003 (winners)
- Eisenhower Trophy (representing Spain): 2002
- Jacques Léglise Trophy (representing the Continent of Europe): 2002 (non-playing captain)
- Palmer Cup (representing Europe): 2003 (winners), 2004 (winners)
- Bonallack Trophy (representing Europe): 2004
- St Andrews Trophy (representing the Continent of Europe): 2004

Professional

- World Cup (representing Spain): 2006, 2009
- Seve Trophy (representing Continental Europe): 2007, 2009, 2013 (winners)
- Royal Trophy (representing Europe): 2012
- EurAsia Cup (representing Europe): 2014

== See also ==
- 2016 Web.com Tour Finals graduates
- 2017 European Tour Qualifying School graduates
