= 2006 Royal Trophy =

Golfing competition

Coordinates: 13.416713°N 101.013361°E

1st Edition of the Royal Trophy
- Dates: 7–8 January 2006
- Venue: Amata Spring Country Club
- Location: Chonburi, Thailand
- Captains: Masahiro Kuramoto (Asia); Seve Ballesteros (Europe)
Asia	7	9	Europe
- Europe wins the Royal Trophy

The 2006 Royal Trophy was the first edition of the Royal Trophy, a team golf event contested between teams representing Asia and Europe. It was held from 7–8 January at the Amata Spring Country Club in Thailand. Europe won the inaugural trophy with a 9–7 victory over Asia.

== Teams ==
Asia		Europe	
Player	Country	Player	Country
Masahiro Kuramoto; Non-playing captain	Japan	Seve Ballesteros; Non-playing captain	Spain
Arjun Atwal	India	Thomas Bjørn	Denmark
Keiichiro Fukabori	Japan	Nick Faldo	England
Hur Suk-ho	South Korea	Kenneth Ferrie	England
Yasuharu Imano	Japan	David Howell	England
Jyoti Randhawa	India	Graeme McDowell	Northern Ireland
Thaworn Wiratchant	Thailand	Paul McGinley	Ireland
Thongchai Jaidee	Thailand	Henrik Stenson	Sweden
Zhang Lianwei	China	Ian Woosnam	Wales

== Schedule ==
- 7 January (Saturday morning) Foursomes x 4
- 7 January (Saturday afternoon) Four-ball x 4
- 8 January (Sunday) Singles x 8

== Saturday morning matches (foursomes) ==
Asia	Results	Europe
Hur/Fukabori	2 up	Howell/Ferrie
Atwal/Randhawa	4 & 3	McGinley/McDowell
Imano/Zhang	1 up	Bjørn/Stenson
Wiratchant/Jaidee	6 & 5	Faldo/Woosnam
1	Session	3
1	Overall	3

== Saturday afternoon matches (four-ball) ==
Asia	Results	Europe
Atwal/Randhawa	1 up	Howell/Ferrie
Hur/Zhang	2 & 1	McGinley/McDowell
Wiratchant/Jaidee	3 & 2	Bjørn/Woosnam
Fukabori/Imano	1 up	Faldo/Stenson
1	Session	3
2	Overall	6

== Sunday's matches (singles) ==
Asia	Results	Europe
Imano	2 up	Howell
Zhang	2 & 1	McGinley
Randhawa	3 & 2	McDowell
Atwal	3 & 2	Faldo
Wiratchant	2 & 1	Woosnam
Hur	2 & 1	Ferrie
Fukabori	4 & 3	Bjørn
Jaidee	5 & 4	Stenson
5	Session	3
7	Overall	9
