= 2006 WGC-World Cup =

2006 World Cup
Tournament information
- Dates: 7–10 December
- Location: Sandy Lane Resort, Barbados; 13.1731°N 59.6369°W
- Course: Sandy Lane Resort and Country Club
- Format: 72 holes stroke play (best ball & alternate shot)

Statistics
- Par: 71
- Length: 7,173 yards (6,559 m)
- Field: 24 two-man teams
- Cut: None
- Prize fund: US$4.0 million
- Winner's share: US$1.4 million

Champion
- Germany; Bernhard Langer & Marcel Siem
- 268 (−16)
- Location in the Caribbean Location in Barbados

The 2006 World Golf Championships-Barbados World Cup took place 7–10 December at the Sandy Lane Resort and Country Club in Barbados. It was the 52nd World Cup and the seventh and last as a World Golf Championship event. 24 countries competed and each country sent two players. The prize money totaled $4,000,000 with $1,400,000 going to the winning pair. The German team of Bernhard Langer and Marcel Siem won. They defeated the Scottish team of Colin Montgomerie and Marc Warren at the first playoff hole.

== Qualification and format ==
The leading 18 available players from different countries in the Official World Golf Ranking on 11 September 2006 qualified automatically. These 18 players then selected a player from their country to compete with them. The person they pick had to be ranked within the top 100 on the Official World Golf Ranking as of 11 September 11. If there was no other player from that country within the top 100, then the next highest ranked player would be their partner. World qualifiers were held in October 2006. Six countries earned their spot in this way, four from the Asian qualifier and two from the South American qualifier.

The tournament was a 72-hole stroke play team event with each team consisting of two players. The first and third days are fourball play and the second and final days are foursomes play.

== Teams ==
Country	Players
Argentina	Ángel Cabrera and Andrés Romero
Australia	Mark Hensby and John Senden
Barbados	Roger Beale and James Johnson
Canada	Jim Rutledge and Mike Weir
Colombia	Manuel Merizalde and Camilo Villegas
Denmark	Thomas Bjørn and Søren Hansen
England	Luke Donald and David Howell
France	Raphaël Jacquelin and Jean van de Velde
Germany	Bernhard Langer and Marcel Siem
Ireland	Pádraig Harrington and Paul McGinley
Italy	Emanuele Canonica and Francesco Molinari
Jamaica	Delroy Cambridge and Peter Horrobin
Japan	Tetsuji Hiratsuka and Hideto Tanihara
Mexico	José Octavio González and Esteban Toledo
Scotland	Colin Montgomerie and Marc Warren
Singapore	Lam Chih Bing and Mardan Mamat
South Africa	Rory Sabbatini and Richard Sterne
South Korea	Hur Suk-ho and Charlie Wi
Spain	Gonzalo Fernández-Castaño and Miguel Ángel Jiménez
Sweden	Carl Pettersson and Henrik Stenson
Switzerland	Martin Rominger and Nicolas Sulzer
Trinidad and Tobago	Robert Ames and Stephen Ames
United States	Stewart Cink and J. J. Henry
Wales	Stephen Dodd and Bradley Dredge

== Scores ==
Place	Country	Score	To par	Money (US$)
1*	Germany	65-69-68-66=268	−16	1,400,000
2	Scotland	67-67-65-69=268	−16	700,000
3	Sweden	64-70-63-72=269	−15	400,000
4	South Africa	64-71-67-68=270	−14	200,000
T5	Argentina	64-67-67-73=271	−13	126,667
T5	Spain	69-66-67-69=271	−13	126,667
T5	United States	66-73-63-69=271	−13	126,667
T8	Australia	68-72-64-69=273	−11	77,500
T8	Italy	68-70-64-71=273	−11	77,500
T8	Mexico	69-68-65-71=273	−11	77,500
T8	Wales	65-75-62-71=273	−11	77,500
T12	Ireland	67-73-66-69=275	−9	57,500
T12	Switzerland	73-70-64-68=275	−9	57,500
14	Colombia	67-74-66-70=277	−7	50,000
T15	Canada	69-72-66-71=278	−6	48,500
T15	England	66-70-70-72=278	−6	48,500
17	Singapore	71-72-68-69=280	−4	47,000
18	Denmark	70-70-71-70=281	−3	46,000
19	South Korea	66-72-70-75=283	−1	45,000
20	France	68-75-65-77=285	+1	44,000
T21	Barbados	69-76-71-72=288	+4	42,500
T21	Trinidad and Tobago	70-73-67-78=288	+4	42,500
23	Japan	67-74-74-74=289	+5	41,000
24	Jamaica	72-76-67-80=295	+11	40,000

*Germany won with a par on the first playoff hole.
