= Golf La Moraleja =

Golf club in Madrid, Spain

Golf La Morleja
- Location within Madrid Location within Spain
- 40.506729°N 3.626544°W

Club information
- Location: Alcobendas, Madrid y Algete (Madrid)
- Established: 1973
- Type: Private
- Owner: Golf La Moraleja, S.A.
- Total holes: 4 x 18-hole golf courses; 1 x 9-hole par 3 course; 8 tennis courts; 12 paddle tennis courts; 2 squash courts; 4 swimming pools
- Tournaments: Open de España (1986); Open de España (1997); World Cup of Golf (1992); Open de Madrid (2006); Padel Tennis World Championship (1992 and 1996)
- Website: www.realclublamoraleja.com

Course 1 Alcobendas (Madrid, Spain)
- Designed by: Jack Niklaus (1976)
- Par: 72
- Length: 5.867 m.
- Course rating: 72.0
- Slope rating: 138

Course 2 Madrid (Madrid, Spain)
- Designed by: Jack Niklaus (1990)
- Par: 72
- Length: 6.390 m.
- Course rating: 74,0
- Slope rating: 134

Course 3 Algete (Madrid, Spain)
- Designed by: Jack Niklaus (2013)
- Par: 72
- Length: 6.854 m.
- Course rating: 73.5
- Slope rating: 130

Course 4 Algete (Madrid, Spain)
- Designed by: Jack Niklaus (2013)
- Par: 72
- Length: 6.487 m.
- Course rating: 72.1
- Slope rating: 136

Golf La Moraleja is one of Spain's most important clubs. It is the largest Spanish golf club for its number of holes and the largest in Europe located in a metropolitan area. Founded in 1973, it currently has four 18-hole golf courses, all rated par 72, designed by Jack Nicklaus. It also contains a 9-hole short course, 8 tennis courts, 12 paddle tennis courts, 2 squash courts, one covered and three open-air swimming pools, a gym and a spa. Added to these are two clubhouses, a children's chalet and a tennis clubhouse (on 1 and 2 courses), plus a prebuilt modular clubhouse for courses 3 and 4. Courses 1 and 2 are located at La Moraleja residential estate (Alcobendas, Madrid). Courses 3 and 4 are located in the municipality of Algete. It has 6,000 shareholder members. In 2013 it was voted the best golf course in Spain by Deporte & Business and in 2014, La Moraleja 3 was voted the second best golf course in Spain by the American magazine Golf Digest. The club has hosted competitions such as the World Cup of Golf, the Spanish Open and the Paddle Tennis World Championship.

== Course 1 ==
Designed by Jack Nicklaus, it is the oldest of the Golf La Moraleja courses. Play began on the course in 1975 and it was officially opened in 1976. It is a short course, narrow and very technical. The lakes and the off-limits play a very important role in the strategy of the game on each hole. Only one of the eighteen holes has no off-limits. The greens are small but very rapid on account of their undulations. Most noteworthy is the 18th hole, a short par 5 with an off-limits on the right and, on the left, a lake which defies any attempts to reach green in two shots. There is also a 9-hole short course, in pitch & putt style, for training and practice; a practice range with 20 covered and 22 uncovered booths; a putting-green, a green for short game practice and a practice bunker.

TEES	METRES	PAR	RATING	SLOPE
██ White	5.867	72	72.0	138
██ Yellow	5.689	72	71.1	136
██ Blue	5.270	72	74.4	131
██ Red	4.969	72	72.3	129

Card of the Course. Pitch & Putt Course Card. Quadrants map

== Course 2 ==
Course 2 is an 18-hole course from the drawing board of Nicklaus Design under the direction of Ron Kirby, which was officially opened in 1990. It measures 6,326 metres from the professional tees and also has a practice range with fifteen covered booths, a putting-green, a green for short game play and a practice bunker. The tiered configuration of the terrain around most of the holes allows spectators to follow the game in comfort during competitions. The course is longer than La Moraleja 1 but also wider and with less vegetation, whereby out-of-line shots are not too badly penalized. There are four lakes which affect six holes. The 16th is a particularly outstanding hole for its beauty and strategic complexity, with its green situated on a tongue of land, which at one and the same time encourages and intimidates players who attempt to reach it in two shots.

TEES	METRES	PAR	RATING	SLOPE
██ White	6.390	72	74,0	134
██ Yellow	5.909	72	71.3	126
██ Blue	5.450	72	74.4	129
██ Red	5.149	72	72.2	125

Card of the Course. Quadrants Map

== Course 3 ==
Course 3 is also the work of Jack Nicklaus. The design has transformed a terrain that was originally flat by introducing small hills at different points, of varying significance, in order to achieve a course with multiple play options on almost all the holes. It is configured as a long, classical, parkland-type course, measuring a total of 6,830 metres, a good challenge for holding important tournaments; although also very pleasant for any amateur to play. Its fairways are wide and its greens, in general, are spacious. It has three enormous lakes which affect half of the holes, more than 1,200 trees and 68 bunkers. Strategy here is more important than distance: it obliges one to carefully think out each shot in order to achieve a better option for the following shot. Nicklaus has taken care to make it so, as indeed to favour players capable of achieving powerful fades. La Moraleja 3 was voted the second best golf course in Spain by the American magazine Golf Digest.

TEES	METRES	PAR	RATING	SLOPE
██ Black	6.854	72		130
██ White	6.333	72	73.5	130
██ Yellow	5.883	72	72.6	129
██ Blue	5.218	72	70.6	132
██ Red	4.631	72	68.4	126

Card of the Course.

== Course 4 ==
Course 4 of Golf La Moraleja, designed by the Nicklaus Design company, is 6,350 metres long. It is an original course with isles of vegetation, a terrain with slight mounds, lakes with aquatic plants. It also offers different opening shot possibilities from the tee in order to multiply play options and offer different strategies. A prebuilt modular clubhouse services courses 3 and 4, which also provides a practice area for long and short play.

TEES	METRES	PAR	RATING	SLOPE
██ Black	6.487	72		136
██ White	6.141	72	72.1	130
██ Yellow	5.603	72	71.1	130
██ Blue	4.982	72	69.3	130
██ Red	4.507	72	68.4	121

Card of the Course.

== Other facilities and services ==
- Cafeteria & restaurant with sports menu
- Children's area
- Golf club hire
- Hand cart hire
- Electric cart hire
- Buggy hire
- Credit cards accepted

== History ==
Golf La Moraleja, S.A. was created in 1973 as a Public Limited Company with the aim of creating facilities for playing golf, for the enjoyment of its 6,000 shareholders. In 1974, grounds were acquired, now occupied by the complex comprising the Clubhouse and Course 1, including the Children's chalet and the maintenance area. The golf course was built between 1974 and 1975, designed and directed by Jack Nicklaus and officially opened in 1976 with a competition in which Valentín Barrios, Sam Snead, Tom Weiskopf and Jack Nicklaus himself took part. In 1989 the grounds where Course 2 now stands were acquired by the company and La Moraleja 2 was opened in 1990. The design of this second golf course came from the drawing board of Nicklaus Designs, under the direction of Ron Kirby. In 2003, negotiations for the sale of a plot of 33 hectares were commenced, which at the time accommodated the Course 2 tennis courts and which the Madrid City Council had reassessed three years previously. The sale endowed Golf La Moraleja with the revenue which the Members Meeting decided was to be used to finance the construction of Courses 3 and 4, which were opened for play in September 2012 and officially inaugurated in April 2013.

The singer and actor Bing Crosby died of a heart attack at Golf La Moraleja on the 14th of October 1977, during a golfing holiday to Madrid.

== Championships ==
- 1981: Johnnie Walker Classic
- 1982: Johnnie Walker Classic
- 1983: Johnnie Walker Classic
- 1984: Johnnie Walker Classic
- 1986: Open de España
- 1996: Pro-Am Oki del Circuito Europeo
- 1997: Open de España
- 1992: World Cup of Golf
- 2006: Open de Madrid
- 2013: Under-16 Championship of Spain
- 1992: Padel TennisWorld Championship
- 1996: Padel TennisWorld Championship

== External links (in English) ==
- www.nicklaus.com
- golfdigest.com: Passport To Play.
- golfcoursearchitecture.net:Two new courses for Madrid club.
- golfinmadrid:Golf La Moraleja.

== External links (in Spanish) ==
- "Golf La Moraleja, segundo mejor campo de España (reseña de Madridiario,24/01/2014).
- "Golf La Moraleja, segundo mejor campo de España (reseña de es.eurosport,13/02/2014).
- "Golf La Moraleja, mejor campo de España para Deporte & Business" (reseña de la web de la Real Federación Española de Golf, 12/12/2013).
- "Ignacio Garrido: El campo 3 de Golf La Moraleja es uno de esos recorrido donde Nicklaus dejó su sello" (Entrevista con Ignacio Garrido).
- Página web de nicklaus.com sobre Golf La Moraleja.
- Golf La Moraleja recibe la Placa al Mérito en Golf de la Real Federación Española de Golf.
- Revistas y boletines online de Golf La Moraleja.
- Sala de prensa de la página web de Golf La Moraleja.
- Página web de Golf La Moraleja.
- Página de Golf La Moraleja en Wikipedia
