= 2009 Vivendi Trophy with Seve Ballesteros =

2009 Seve Trophy
- Dates: 24–27 September
- Venue: Golf de Saint-Nom-la-Bretèche
- Location: Paris, France
- Captains: Thomas Bjørn (Europe); Paul McGinley (GB&I)
(Europe)	11½	16½	(United Kingdom) (Republic of Ireland)
- Great Britain and Ireland wins the Seve Trophy

The 2009 Vivendi Trophy with Seve Ballesteros, formerly known as the Seve Trophy, was played 24–27 September at Golf de Saint-Nom-la-Bretèche in France. The team captain for Great Britain and Ireland was Paul McGinley, with the captain for Continental Europe being Thomas Bjørn. Great Britain and Ireland won the Trophy for the fifth consecutive time.

== Format ==
The format remained the same for the fourth successive time. The teams competed over four days with five fourball matches on both Thursday and Friday, four greensomes matches on Saturday morning, four foursomes matches on Saturday afternoon and ten singles matches on Sunday. It means a total of 28 points are available with 14½ points required for victory. If the score finished at 14–14, then two players from each team would play the 18th using the greensomes format to find the winner.

There was a big reduction in the prize money for the 2009 event. Each member of the winner team received €65,000, the losing team €55,000 each, giving a total prize fund of €1,150,000.

== Teams ==
The teams were made up of five players from the World Rankings list and five players from the European points list following the conclusion of the Mercedes-Benz Championship on 14 September 2009. There were a number of players who qualified for the trophy, but pulled out. These include Pádraig Harrington, Sergio García, Lee Westwood, Martin Kaymer and Paul Casey.

Team GB&I
Name	Country	Qualification
Paul McGinley	Ireland	Non-playing captain
Rory McIlroy	Northern Ireland	World rankings
Ross Fisher	England	World rankings
Oliver Wilson	England	World rankings
Graeme McDowell	Northern Ireland	World rankings
Chris Wood	England	World rankings
Simon Dyson	England	European points
Robert Rock	England	European points
Nick Dougherty	England	European points
Steve Webster	England	European points
Anthony Wall	England	European points

Team Continental Europe
Name	Country	Qualification
Thomas Bjørn	Denmark	Non-playing captain
Henrik Stenson	Sweden	World rankings
Robert Karlsson	Sweden	World rankings
Søren Kjeldsen	Denmark	World rankings
Miguel Ángel Jiménez	Spain	World rankings
Søren Hansen	Denmark	World rankings
Gonzalo Fernández-Castaño	Spain	European points
Álvaro Quirós	Spain	European points
Peter Hanson	Sweden	European points
Anders Hansen	Denmark	European points
Francesco Molinari	Italy	European points

== Day one ==
Thursday, 24 September 2009

=== Fourball ===
	Results
McDowell/McIlroy	(United Kingdom) (Republic of Ireland) 4 & 3	Kjeldsen/Quirós
Wall/Wood	(United Kingdom) (Republic of Ireland) 6 & 5	Karlsson/Stenson
Dyson/Wilson	(United Kingdom) (Republic of Ireland) 3 & 2	S. Hansen/Hanson
Rock/Webster	(Europe) 4 & 3	A. Hansen/Molinari
Dougherty/Fisher	(Europe) 2 & 1	Fdez-Castaño/Jiménez
3	Session	2
3	Overall	2

== Day two ==
Friday, 25 September 2009

=== Fourball ===
	Results
Dyson/Wilson	(United Kingdom) (Republic of Ireland) 2 & 1	Quirós/Stenson
Dougherty/Fisher	(United Kingdom) (Republic of Ireland) 3 & 2	S. Hansen/Hanson
McDowell/McIlroy	(Europe) 3 & 1	A. Hansen/Molinari
Rock/Webster	(Europe) 1 up	Fdez-Castaño/Karlsson
Wall/Wood	(United Kingdom) (Republic of Ireland) 3 & 2	Jiménez/Kjeldsen
3	Session	2
6	Overall	4

== Day three ==
Saturday, 26 September 2009

=== Morning greensomes ===
	Results
McDowell/McIlroy	(United Kingdom) (Republic of Ireland) 2 & 1	Hanson/Stenson
Dougherty/Rock	(United Kingdom) (Republic of Ireland) 5 & 4	Fdez-Castaño/Karlsson
Fisher/Wood	(United Kingdom) (Republic of Ireland) 1 up	A. Hansen/Molinari
Dyson/Wilson	(Europe) 1 up	Jiménez/Quirós
3	Session	1
9	Overall	5

=== Afternoon foursomes ===
	Results
McDowell/McIlroy	(United Kingdom) (Republic of Ireland) 2 & 1	S. Hansen/Kjeldsen
Dougherty/Webster	halved	Hanson/Stenson
Fisher/Wood	(United Kingdom) (Republic of Ireland) 3 & 2	A. Hansen/Molinari
Rock/Wilson	(United Kingdom) (Republic of Ireland) 1 up	Jiménez/Quirós
3½	Session	½
12½	Overall	5½

== Day four ==
Sunday, 27 September 2009

=== Singles ===
	Results
Rory McIlroy	(United Kingdom) (Republic of Ireland) 1 up	Henrik Stenson
Graeme McDowell	(United Kingdom) (Republic of Ireland) 3 & 2	Robert Karlsson
Anthony Wall	halved	Álvaro Quirós
Ross Fisher	(Europe) 3 & 1	Miguel Ángel Jiménez
Steve Webster	(Europe) 4 & 2	Søren Hansen
Simon Dyson	(Europe) 3 & 1	Søren Kjeldsen
Robert Rock	(United Kingdom) (Republic of Ireland) 1 up	Gonzalo Fdez-Castaño
Nick Dougherty	(Europe) 7 & 6	Anders Hansen
Chris Wood	halved	Peter Hanson
Oliver Wilson	(Europe) 5 & 4	Francesco Molinari
4	Session	6
16½	Overall	11½

Anthony Wall injured his shoulder on Friday afternoon. He did not play on the Saturday and was still unfit to play in the singles on Sunday. Under the rules of the event a half was agreed with a player chosen by Thomas Bjørn to sit out the singles.
