= Oki Pro-Am =

Tournament information
- Location: Madrid, Spain
- Established: 1996
- Course: Golf La Moraleja
- Par: 72
- Tour: European Tour
- Format: Stroke play
- Prize fund: £450,000
- Month played: October
- Final year: 1997

Tournament record score
- Aggregate: 266 Paul McGinley (1997)
- To par: −22 as above

Final champion
- (Republic of Ireland) Paul McGinley
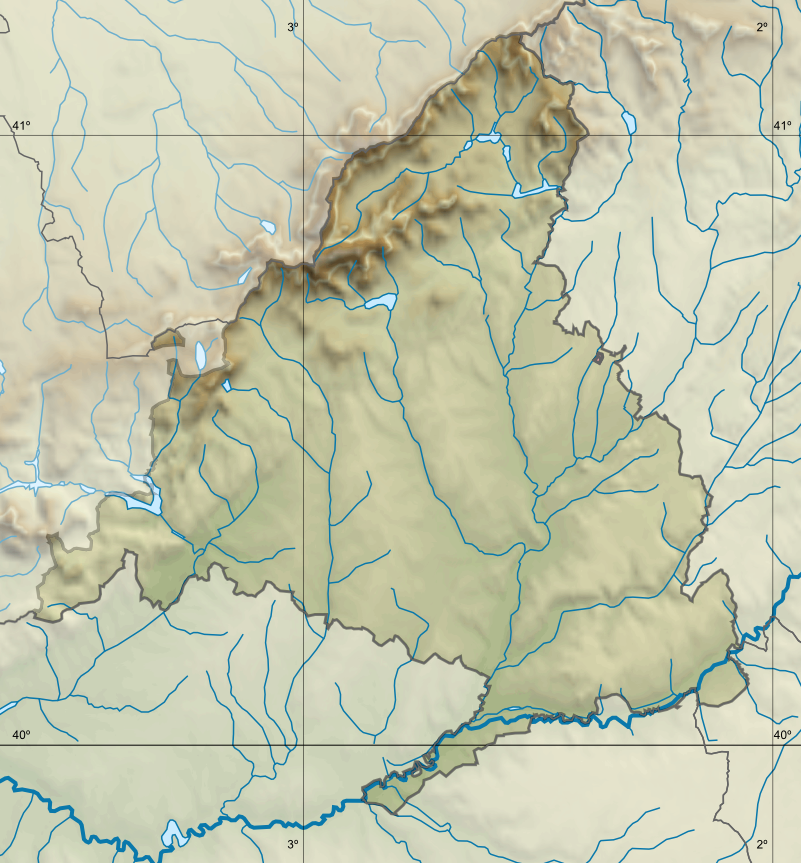
- Location in Spain Location in the Community of Madrid

The Oki Pro-Am was a men's professional golf tournament. It was a European Tour event that was only played in 1996 and 1997. It was played at Golf La Moraleja on the number 1 and 2 courses in Madrid, Spain.

== Winners ==
Year	Winner	Score	To par	Margin of victory	Runner-up	Purse (£)	Winner's share (£)
1998	Cancelled						
1997	(Republic of Ireland) Paul McGinley	266	−22	4 strokes	(England) Iain Pyman	450,000	75,000
1996	(United States) Tom Kite	273	−15	1 stroke	(Argentina) Ángel Cabrera	450,000	75,000
