= 2007 Royal Trophy =

Coordinates: 13.416713°N 101.013361°E

2nd Edition of the Royal Trophy
- Dates: 12–14 January 2007
- Venue: Amata Spring Country Club
- Location: Chonburi, Thailand
- Captains: Naomichi "Joe" Ozaki (Asia); Seve Ballesteros (Europe)
Asia	3½	12½	Europe
- Europe wins the Royal Trophy

The 2007 Royal Trophy was the second edition of the Royal Trophy, a team golf event contested between teams representing Asia and Europe. It was held from 12–14 January at the Amata Spring Country Club in Thailand. Europe retained the trophy with an emphatic 12½–3½ victory, prompting suggestions that it might be desirable to even up the contest by having Europe play a combined team representing Asia and Australasia.

== Teams ==
Asia		Europe	
Player	Country	Player	Country
Naomichi "Joe" Ozaki; Non-playing captain	Japan	Seve Ballesteros; Non-playing captain	Spain
Tetsuji Hiratsuka	Japan	Darren Clarke	Northern Ireland
Hur Suk-ho	South Korea	Johan Edfors	Sweden
Prom Meesawat	Thailand	Niclas Fasth	Sweden
Jeev Milkha Singh	India	Robert Karlsson	Sweden
Toru Taniguchi	Japan	Paul McGinley	Ireland
Thaworn Wiratchant	Thailand	Henrik Stenson	Sweden
Thongchai Jaidee	Thailand	Anthony Wall	England
Yang Yong-eun	South Korea	Lee Westwood	England

== Schedule ==
- 12 January (Friday) Foursomes x 4
- 13 January (Saturday) Four-ball x 4
- 14 January (Sunday) Singles x 8

== Friday's matches (foursomes) ==
Asia	Results	Europe
Hur/Taniguchi	4 & 3	Westwood/Clarke
Hiratsuka/Meesawat	6 & 5	Edfors/Stenson
Singh/Yang	halved	Wall/McGinley
Jaidee/Wiratchant	3 & 1	Fasth/Karlsson
½	Session	3½
½	Overall	3½

== Saturday's matches (four-ball) ==
Asia	Results	Europe
Jaidee/Meesawat	halved	Clarke/Westwood
Yang/Taniguchi	2 & 1	Edfors/Stenson
Hiratsuka/Wiratchant	1 up	Wall/McGinley
Singh/Hur	halved	Fasth/Karlsson
1	Session	3
1½	Overall	6½

== Sunday's matches (singles) ==
Asia	Results	Europe
Taniguchi	4 & 3	Westwood
Meesawat	halved	Clarke
Hur	3 & 2	Edfors
Wiratchant	2 & 1	McGinley
Hiratsuka	4 & 2	Wall
Singh	3 & 2	Karlsson
Yang	halved	Stenson
Jaidee	2 & 1	Fasth
2	Session	6
3½	Overall	12½
