= 2013 Royal Trophy =

7th Edition of the Royal Trophy
- Dates: 20–22 December 2013
- Venue: Dragon Lake Golf Club
- Location: Guangzhou, China
- Captains: Yang Yong-eun (Asia); José María Olazábal (Europe)
Asia	7½	8½	Europe
- Europe wins the Royal Trophy

The 2013 Royal Trophy was the seventh edition of the Royal Trophy, a team golf event contested between teams representing Asia and Europe. It was held from 20 to 22 December at the Dragon Lake Golf Club in Guangzhou, China. Europe won the event by a score of 8½ to 7½. They won five of the last six singles matches and halved the other for the victory.

== Teams ==
Asia		Europe	
Player	Country	Player	Country
Yang Yong-eun; Non-playing captain	South Korea	José María Olazábal; Non-playing captain	Spain
Kiradech Aphibarnrat	Thailand	Nicolas Colsaerts	Belgium
Hiroyuki Fujita	Japan	Stephen Gallacher	Scotland
Ryo Ishikawa	Japan	David Howell	England
Kim Hyung-sung	South Korea	Paul Lawrie	Scotland
Kim Kyung-tae	South Korea	Thorbjørn Olesen	Denmark
Liang Wenchong	China	Álvaro Quirós	Spain
Thongchai Jaidee	Thailand	Marc Warren	Scotland
Wu Ashun	China	Bernd Wiesberger	Austria

== Schedule ==
- 20 December (Friday) Foursomes x 4
- 21 December (Saturday) Four-ball x 4
- 22 December (Sunday) Singles x 8

== Friday's matches (foursomes) ==
Asia	Results	Europe
Jaidee/Aphibarnrat	5 & 3	Gallacher/Lawrie
Ishikawa/Fujita	3 & 2	Colsaerts/Wiesberger
Kim K./Kim H.	4 & 2	Quirós/Olesen
Liang/Wu	2 & 1	Howell/Warren
3	Session	1
3	Overall	1

== Saturday's matches (four-ball) ==
Asia	Results	Europe
Jaidee/Aphibarnrat	2 & 1	Lawrie/Gallacher
Liang/Wu	halved	Howell/Warren
Ishikawa/Fujita	2 & 1	Wiesberger/Olesen
Kim K./Kim H.	halved	Colsaerts/Quirós
2	Session	2
5	Overall	3

== Sunday's matches (singles) ==
Asia	Results	Europe
Aphibarnrat	3 & 2	Lawrie
Jaidee	4 & 2	Gallacher
Ishikawa	1 up	Warren
Kim H.	1 up	Howell
Kim K.	halved	Quirós
Wu	3 & 2	Olesen
Fujita	3 & 2	Wiesberger
Liang	2 up	Colsaerts
2½	Session	5½
7½	Overall	8½
