= 2012 Royal Trophy =

6th Edition of the Royal Trophy
- Dates: 14–16 December 2012
- Venue: Empire Hotel and Country Club
- Location: Jerudong, Brunei
- Captains: Naomichi "Joe" Ozaki (Asia); José María Olazábal (Europe)
Asia	8	8	Europe
- After playoff Asia wins the Royal Trophy

The 2012 Royal Trophy was the sixth edition of the Royal Trophy, a team golf event contested between teams representing Asia and Europe. It was held from 14–16 December at the Empire Hotel and Country Club in Jerudong, Brunei. After the two teams tied 8–8, Asia won a sudden-death playoff. Kim Kyung-tae and Yang Yong-eun faced Nicolas Colsaerts and Francesco Molinari in a four-ball match, with Kim's birdie giving Asia the win on the first hole.

== Teams ==
Asia		Europe	
Player	Country	Player	Country
Naomichi "Joe" Ozaki; Non-playing captain	Japan		
Kiradech Aphibarnrat	Thailand	José María Olazábal; Playing captain	Spain
Bae Sang-moon	South Korea	Nicolas Colsaerts	Belgium
Yoshinori Fujimoto	Japan	Gonzalo Fernández-Castaño	Spain
Ryo Ishikawa	Japan	Miguel Ángel Jiménez	Spain
Kim Kyung-tae	South Korea	Edoardo Molinari	Italy
Jeev Milkha Singh	India	Francesco Molinari	Italy
Wu Ashun	China	Marcel Siem	Germany
Yang Yong-eun	South Korea	Henrik Stenson	Sweden

== Schedule ==
- 14 December (Friday) Foursomes x 4
- 15 December (Saturday) Four-ball x 4
- 16 December (Sunday) Singles x 8

== Friday's matches (foursomes) ==
Asia	Results	Europe
Fujimoto/Wu	2 & 1	Molinari/Molinari
Aphibarnrat/Singh	1 up	Colsaerts/Siem
Bae/Ishikawa	5 & 4	Stenson/Fdez-Castaño
Kim/Yang	halved	Jiménez/Olazábal
½	Session	3½
½	Overall	3½

== Saturday's matches (four-ball) ==
Asia	Results	Europe
Aphibarnrat/Singh	halved	Jiménez/Olazábal
Bae/Wu	halved	Colsaerts/Siem
Kim/Yang	2 & 1	Fdez-Castaño/Stenson
Fujimoto/Ishikawa	3 & 2	Molinari/Molinari
3	Session	1
3½	Overall	4½

== Sunday's matches (singles) ==
Asia	Results	Europe
Aphibarnrat	halved	Olazábal
Bae	1 up	Colsaerts
Kim	halved	Fdez-Castaño
Fujimoto	1 up	Siem
Wu	halved	E. Molinari
Singh	1 up	Jiménez
Ishikawa	1 up	Stenson
Yang	2 & 1	F. Molinari
4½	Session	3½
8	Overall	8
