= Kenneth Ferrie =

English professional golfer

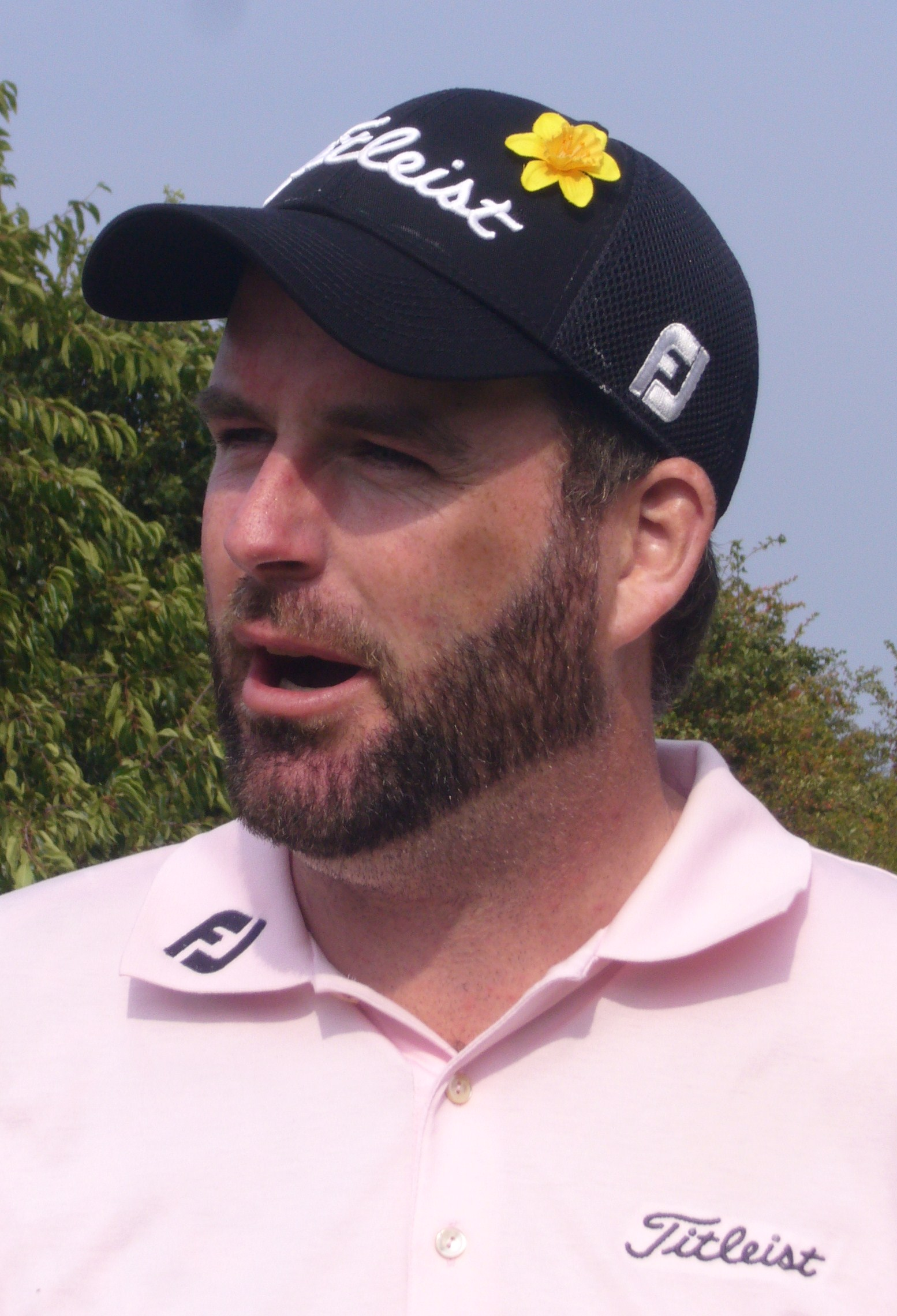
- KLM Open 2009

Personal information
- Full name: Kenneth Andrew Ferrie
- Nationality: England
- Born: 28 September 1978 (age 48) Ashington, Northumberland, England
- Height: 6 ft 4 in (1.93 m)
- Weight: 225 lb (102 kg; 16.1 st)

Career
- Sport: Golf
- College: Midland College
- Turned professional: 1999
- Current tour: Tartan Pro Tour
- Former tours: European Tour; PGA Tour; Challenge Tour
- Professional wins: 6
- Highest ranking: 68 (11 December 2005)

Number of wins by tour
- European Tour: 3
- Challenge Tour: 2
- Other: 1

Best results in major championships
- Masters Tournament: CUT: 2007
- PGA Championship: CUT: 2006
- U.S. Open: T6: 2006
- The Open Championship: T42: 2004

Kenneth Andrew Ferrie (born 28 September 1978) is an English professional golfer.

== Early life and amateur career ==
Ferrie was born in Ashington, Northumberland. He won the British Boys Championship in 1996 and made his first appearance in a European Tour event that year as an invitee at his local event, the Slaley Hall Northumberland Challenge. He attended Midland College in Texas, United States, where he was a two-time NJCAA All-American.

== Professional career ==
Ferrie turned professional in 1999. He began his career on the second tier Challenge Tour in 2000, claiming his first win at the Tessali Open del Sud. He was successful at the 2000 qualifying school, earning the right to play on the European Tour, but he initially struggled at that level, although he continued to have success on the Challenge Tour, capturing his second title at the Challenge Total Fina Elf. At the end of the season, he had to return to the qualifying school to retain his tour card for 2002.

In 2002, Ferrie just did enough to retain his playing status on the European Tour, ending the season in 112th place on the Order of Merit, thanks largely to finishing tied for 3rd in the Novotel Perrier Open de France. The following season, Ferrie won for the first time on the European Tour at the Canarias Open de Espana, securing his place on tour for two years. In 2005 he came from behind to win the Smurfit European Open, one of the leading tournaments in Europe, and went on to finish the season a career best 11th on the Order of Merit, with the win also giving him a five-year exemption on the tour.

In the 2006 U.S. Open at Winged Foot, Ferrie held the sole lead for part of the third round before ending it tied at the top of the leaderboard with Phil Mickelson. He was unable to maintain his challenge and recorded a final round 76 to slip back into a tie for sixth, three strokes behind winner Geoff Ogilvy.

Following an unsuccessful season on the European Tour in 2007, Ferrie played on the U.S.-based PGA Tour in 2008, having earned his card through qualifying school. However he failed to earn enough prize-money to maintain his playing rights and in 2009 returned to the European Tour. He won his third European Tour title in 2011.

Ferrie lost his full European Tour playing rights at the end of 2012 and did not complete qualifying school.

Ferrie's brother, Iain, is also a professional golfer who has played on the Challenge Tour.

== Amateur wins (1) ==
- 1996 Boys Amateur Championship

== Professional wins (6) ==
=== European Tour wins (3) ===
No.	Date	Tournament	Winning score	Margin of victory	Runner(s)-up
1	27 Apr 2003	Canarias Open de España	−22 (67-65-65-69=266)	Playoff	(Sweden) Peter Hedblom, (Republic of Ireland) Peter Lawrie
2	3 Jul 2005	Smurfit European Open	−3 (75-70-70-70=285)	2 strokes	(Scotland) Colin Montgomerie, (England) Graeme Storm
3	25 Sep 2011	Austrian Golf Open	−12 (72-70-67-67=276)	Playoff	(England) Simon Wakefield

European Tour playoff record (2–0)

No.	Year	Tournament	Opponent(s)	Result
1	2003	Canarias Open de España	(Sweden) Peter Hedblom, (Republic of Ireland) Peter Lawrie	Won with birdie on second extra hole
2	2011	Austrian Golf Open	(England) Simon Wakefield	Won with birdie on first extra hole

=== Challenge Tour wins (2) ===
No.	Date	Tournament	Winning score	Margin of victory	Runner(s)-up
1	10 Sep 2000	Tessali Open del Sud	−18 (68-68-63-67=266)	3 strokes	(England) Mark Foster, (France) Christophe Pottier
2	8 Jul 2001	Challenge Total Fina Elf	−20 (71-65-63-69=268)	1 stroke	(England) Andrew Marshall

=== Other wins (1) ===
- 2005 Northern Rock Masters

== Results in major championships ==
Tournament	2003	2004	2005	2006	2007	2008	2009	2010	2011
Masters Tournament					CUT				
U.S. Open				T6	T42				
The Open Championship	CUT	T42	CUT	WD					70
PGA Championship				CUT					

Top 10
Did not play

CUT = missed the half-way cut
WD = Withdrew
"T" = tied

== Results in World Golf Championships ==
Tournament	2005
Match Play	
Championship	T46
Invitational	T19

Did not play

"T" = Tied

== Team appearances ==
Amateur

- Jacques Léglise Trophy (representing Great Britain & Ireland): 1996
- European Youths' Team Championship (representing England): 1998

Professional

- Royal Trophy (representing Europe): 2006 (winners)

== See also ==
- 2007 PGA Tour Qualifying School graduates
