= 2009 Royal Trophy =

Coordinates: 13.416713°N 101.013361°E

3rd Edition of the Royal Trophy
- Dates: 9–11 January 2009
- Venue: Amata Spring Country Club
- Location: Chonburi, Thailand
- Captains: Naomichi "Joe" Ozaki (Asia); José María Olazábal (Europe)
Asia	10	6	Europe
- Asia wins the Royal Trophy

The 2009 Royal Trophy was the third edition of the Royal Trophy, a team golf event contested between teams representing Asia and Europe. It was held from 9–11 January at the Amata Spring Country Club in Thailand. The Asian team won for the first time, by a margin of 10 points to 6.

== Teams ==
Asia		Europe	
Player	Country	Player	Country
Naomichi "Joe" Ozaki; Non-playing captain	Japan	José María Olazábal; Non-playing captain	Spain
Hur Suk-ho	South Korea	Nick Dougherty	England
Ryo Ishikawa	Japan	Johan Edfors	Sweden
Liang Wenchong	China	Niclas Fasth	Sweden
Prayad Marksaeng	Thailand	Søren Hansen	Denmark
Toru Taniguchi	Japan	Pablo Larrazábal	Spain
Hideto Tanihara	Japan	Paul Lawrie	Scotland
Thongchai Jaidee	Thailand	Paul McGinley	Ireland
Charlie Wi	South Korea	Oliver Wilson	England

== Schedule ==
- 9 January (Friday) Foursomes x 4
- 10 January (Saturday) Four-ball x 4
- 11 January (Sunday) Singles x 8

== Friday's matches (foursomes) ==
Asia	Results	Europe
Ishikawa/Taniguchi	2 & 1	Lawrie/Hansen
Wi/Liang	2 up	McGinley/Larrazábal
Tanihara/Hur	1 up	Dougherty/Wilson
Jaidee/Marksaeng	5 & 4	Fasth/Edfors
3	Session	1
3	Overall	1

== Saturday's matches (four-ball) ==
Asia	Results	Europe
Ishikawa/Taniguchi	halved	Hansen/Lawrie
Wi/Liang	3 & 2	Dougherty/Wilson
Tanihara/Hur	2 & 1	Fasth/Edfors
Jaidee/Marksaeng	4 & 2	Larrazábal/McGinley
3½	Session	½
6½	Overall	1½

== Sunday's matches (singles) ==
Asia	Results	Europe
Ishikawa	halved	Hansen
Liang	3 & 2	Lawrie
Wi	1 up	Dougherty
Marksaeng	5 & 4	Larrazábal
Tanihara	3 & 2	Wilson
Hur	5 & 4	Edfors
Taniguchi	7 & 6	Fasth
Jaidee	5 & 4	McGinley
3½	Session	4½
10	Overall	6
