= 2002 WGC-World Cup =

Coordinates: 20°40′N 105°16′W

2002 World Cup
Tournament information
- Dates: 12–15 December
- Location: Puerto Vallarta, Mexico
- Courses: Vista Vallarta Club de Golf; Nicklaus Course
- Format: 72 holes stroke play (best ball & alternate shot)

Statistics
- Par: 72
- Length: 7,153 yards (6,541 m)
- Field: 24 two-man teams
- Cut: None
- Prize fund: US$3.0 million
- Winner's share: US$1.0 million

Champion
- Japan; Toshimitsu Izawa & Shigeki Maruyama
- 252 (−36)

The 2002 WGC-World Cup took place 12–15 December at the Vista Vallarta Club de Golf, Nicklaus Course in Puerto Vallarta, Mexico. It was the 48th World Cup and the third as a World Golf Championship event. 24 countries competed and each country sent two players. The prize money totaled $3,000,000 with $1,000,000 going to the winning pair. The Japanese team of Toshimitsu Izawa and Shigeki Maruyama won. They won by two strokes over the American team of Phil Mickelson and David Toms.

== Qualification and format ==
18 teams qualified based on the Official World Golf Ranking and were joined by host country, Mexico, and five teams via qualifiers in Malaysia and Mexico.

The tournament was a 72-hole stroke play team event with each team consisting of two players. The first and third days were fourball play and the second and final days were foursomes play.

== Teams ==
Country	Players
Argentina	Ángel Cabrera and Eduardo Romero
Australia	Craig Parry and Adam Scott
Canada	Ian Leggatt and Mike Weir
Colombia	Jesús Amaya and Rigoberto Velásquez
Denmark	Anders Hansen and Søren Hansen
England	Paul Casey and Justin Rose
Fiji	Dinesh Chand and Vijay Singh
France	Raphaël Jacquelin and Thomas Levet
Germany	Alex Čejka and Sven Strüver
Ireland	Pádraig Harrington and Paul McGinley
Japan	Toshimitsu Izawa and Shigeki Maruyama
Mexico	Pablo del Olmo and Esteban Toledo
Myanmar	Kyi Hla Han and Soo Kyaw Naing
New Zealand	Michael Campbell and Craig Perks
Scotland	Alastair Forsyth and Paul Lawrie
Singapore	Lam Chih Bing and Mardan Mamat
South Africa	Tim Clark and Rory Sabbatini
South Korea	K. J. Choi and Hur Suk-ho
Sweden	Niclas Fasth and Carl Pettersson
Switzerland	André Bossert and Marc Chatelain
Trinidad and Tobago	Robert Ames and Stephen Ames
United States	Phil Mickelson and David Toms
Venezuela	Jaime Acevedo and Carlos Larraín
Wales	Bradley Dredge and Ian Woosnam

== Scores ==
Place	Country	Score	To par	Money (US$)
1	Japan	64-64-58-66=252	−36	1,000,000
2	United States	65-67-57-65=254	−34	500,000
T3	England	65-63-62-68=258	−30	225,000
T3	South Korea	61-67-64-66=258	−30	225,000
5	South Africa	62-64-62-71=259	−29	115,000
T6	Argentina	64-68-62-66=260	−28	95,000
T6	Australia	60-67-65-68=260	−28	95,000
T8	Canada	59-67-64-71=261	−27	75,000
T8	Ireland	64-67-62-68=261	−27	75,000
10	Fiji	63-62-62-75=262	−26	60,000
11	Denmark	63-70-62-68=263	−25	55,000
T12	Scotland	63-65-62-75=265	−23	47,500
T12	Wales	63-68-65-69=265	−23	47,500
T14	Sweden	62-71-64-69=266	−22	39,500
T14	Switzerland	63-67-65-71=266	−22	39,500
16	Myanmar	66-66-64-72=268	−20	38,000
T17	France	61-72-64-73=270	−18	35,500
T17	New Zealand	65-73-64-68=270	−18	35,500
T17	Singapore	70-65-65-70=270	−18	35,500
T17	Trinidad and Tobago	63-66-64-77=270	−18	35,500
21	Germany	67-69-64-71=271	−17	33,000
22	Venezuela	66-67-72-69=274	−14	32,000
T23	Colombia	66-68-69-74=277	−11	30,500
T23	Mexico	68-72-66-71=277	−11	30,500
