= Challenge Total Fina Elf =

Golf tournament in France

Tournament information
- Location: Chambourcy, France
- Established: 2001
- Course: Golf de Joyenval
- Par: 72
- Length: 6,826 yards (6,242 m)
- Tour: Challenge Tour
- Format: Stroke play
- Prize fund: €120,000
- Month played: July
- Final year: 2001

Tournament record score
- Aggregate: 268 Kenneth Ferrie (2001)
- To par: −20 as above

Final champion
- (England) Kenneth Ferrie
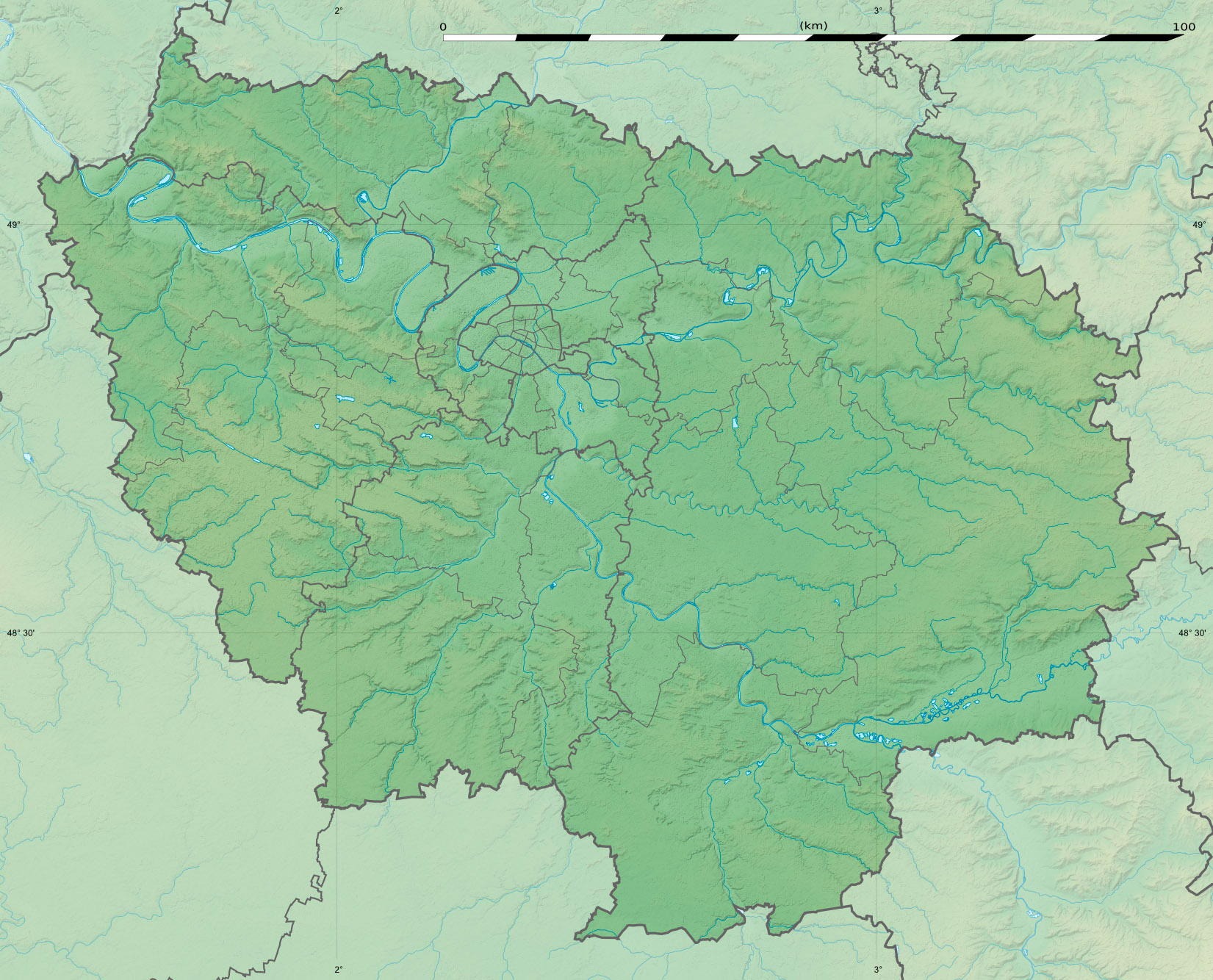
- Location in France Location in Île-de-France

The Challenge Total Fina Elf was a one-off golf tournament on the Challenge Tour played in July 2001 at Joyenval Golf Club in Chambourcy, France.

== Winners ==
Year	Winner	Score	To par	Margin of victory	Runner-up
2001	(England) Kenneth Ferrie	268	−20	1 stroke	(England) Andrew Marshall
