= 2010 Royal Trophy =

Coordinates: 13.416713°N 101.013361°E

4th Edition of the Royal Trophy
- Dates: 8–10 January 2010
- Venue: Amata Spring Country Club
- Location: Chonburi, Thailand
- Captains: Naomichi "Joe" Ozaki (Asia); Colin Montgomerie (Europe)
Asia	7½	8½	Europe
- Europe wins the Royal Trophy

The 2010 Royal Trophy was the fourth edition of the Royal Trophy, a team golf event contested between teams representing Asia and Europe. It was held from 8–10 January at the Amata Spring Country Club in Thailand. Europe regained the trophy by a score of 8½ points to 7½.

== Teams ==
Asia		Europe	
Player	Country	Player	Country
Naomichi "Joe" Ozaki; Non-playing captain	Japan		
Gaganjeet Bhullar	India	Colin Montgomerie; Playing captain	Scotland
Ryo Ishikawa	Japan	Simon Dyson	England
Liang Wenchong	China	Peter Hanson	Sweden
Koumei Oda	Japan	Robert Karlsson	Sweden
Prayad Marksaeng	Thailand	Søren Kjeldsen	Denmark
Jeev Milkha Singh	India	Pablo Martín	Spain
Thongchai Jaidee	Thailand	Alex Norén	Sweden
Charlie Wi	South Korea	Henrik Stenson	Sweden

== Schedule ==
- 8 January (Friday) Foursomes x 4
- 9 January (Saturday) Four-ball x 4
- 10 January (Sunday) Singles x 8

== Friday's matches (foursomes) ==
Asia	Results	Europe
Ishikawa/Oda	3 & 2	Montgomerie/Martin
Singh/Bhullar	halved	Hanson/Kjeldsen
Wi/Liang	4 & 2	Karlsson/Norén
Marksaeng/Jaidee	3 & 1	Dyson/Stenson
2½	Session	1½
2½	Overall	1½

== Saturday's matches (four-ball) ==
Asia	Results	Europe
Singh/Bhullar	4 & 3	Montgomerie/Dyson
Wi/Liang	5 & 4	Kjeldsen/Hanson
Ishikawa/Oda	6 & 4	Norén/Karlsson
Marksaeng/Jaidee	3 & 1	Stenson/Martin
1	Session	3
3½	Overall	4½

== Sunday's matches (singles) ==
Asia	Results	Europe
Wi	1 up	Dyson
Liang	halved	Montgomerie
Oda	5 & 3	Norén
Singh	2 & 1	Karlsson
Marksaeng	2 & 1	Martin
Ishikawa	5 & 4	Hanson
Bhullar	2 & 1	Kjeldsen
Jaidee	halved	Stenson
4	Session	4
7½	Overall	8½
