= Paul McGinley =

Irish professional golfer (born 1966)

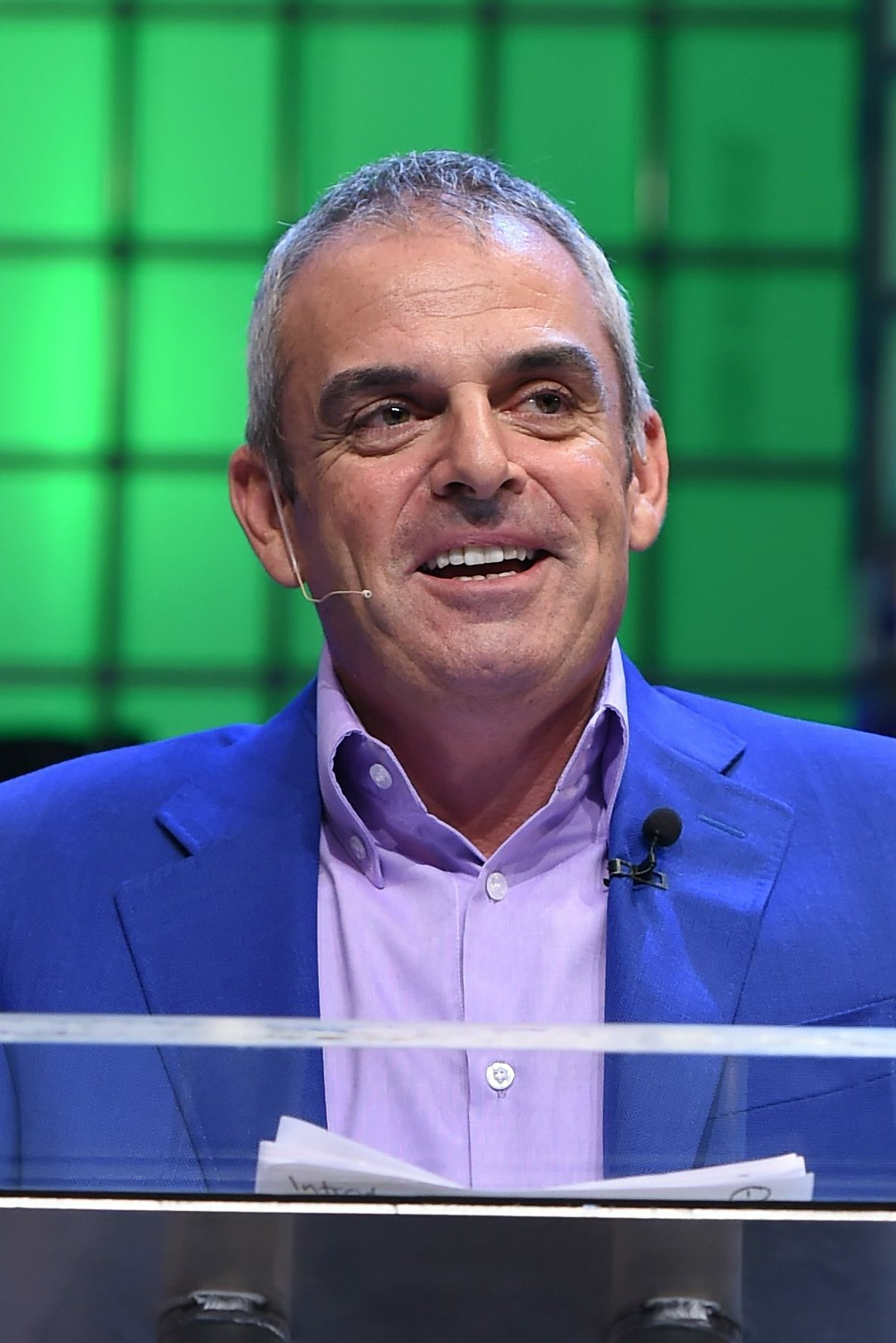
- McGinley in 2014

Personal information
- Full name: Paul Noel McGinley
- Nationality: Ireland
- Born: 16 December 1966 (age 59) Dublin, County Dublin, Ireland
- Height: 1.70 m (5 ft 7 in)
- Weight: 73 kg (161 lb; 11.5 st)
- Spouse: Allison Shapcott (m. 1996)
- Children: 3

Career
- Sport: Golf
- College: Dublin Institute of Technology; United States International University
- Turned professional: 1991
- Current tour: European Senior Tour
- Former tour: European Tour
- Professional wins: 10
- Highest ranking: 18 (30 October 2005)

Number of wins by tour
- European Tour: 4
- Other: 6

Best results in major championships
- Masters Tournament: T18: 2002
- PGA Championship: T6: 2004
- U.S. Open: T42: 2005
- The Open Championship: T14: 1996

Paul Noel McGinley (born 16 December 1966) is an Irish professional golfer. He has won four events on the European Tour. At the 2002 Ryder Cup, he famously holed a ten-foot putt on the 18th hole in his match against Jim Furyk at The Belfry which won the Ryder Cup for Europe. He was the winning captain of Europe in the 2014 Ryder Cup and the first Irishman to captain Europe's Ryder Cup side.

== Early life ==
McGinley was raised in Rathfarnham and was educated at St Mary's BNS and Coláiste Éanna. His father Mick – who is from Dunfanaghy – played Gaelic football for Donegal, while his mother Julia comes from Rathmullan. McGinley himself was born in Dublin and studied at Dublin Institute of Technology. After his knee injury, McGinley turned his full attention to golf.

McGinley later said that when he played golf as part of a team it helped to raise his game to another level. He credited his experience of Gaelic football for his passion for team sports and suggested it played a part in why he was appointed European captain for the 2014 Ryder Cup.

== Amateur career ==
McGinley later attended the United States International University in San Diego on a golf scholarship, where he gained a master's degree in marketing.

McGinley won the 1989 Irish Amateur Close Championship and the 1991 South of Ireland Championship at Lahinch Golf Club. He was selected for the 1991 Britain & Ireland Walker Cup team at Portmarnock Golf Club, just north of Dublin, where a strong American team that included Phil Mickelson beat Britain & Ireland 14–10.

== Professional career ==
In 1991, McGinley turned professional. He joined the European Tour in 1992, aged 25. In 1993, he lost a playoff to Costantino Rocca in the French Open. In 1994, McGinley lost a playoff to José María Olazábal in the Open Mediterrania.

McGinley eventually won his first title on the European Tour at the 1996 Hohe Brücke Open. In 1997 he won the World Cup of Golf for Ireland with Pádraig Harrington (who attended the same secondary school, Coláiste Éanna, as McGinley).

At the 2001 Celtic Manor Resort Wales Open, McGinley won the tournament on the fifth extra hole of a playoff in an event that was so badly disrupted by torrential rain that it was reduced to just 36 holes. After his victory, McGinley quipped: "Goran Ivanišević said God sent the rain for him at Wimbledon and maybe he sent it for me too!"

McGinley's best finish in one of the four major championships is a tie for 6th place in the 2004 PGA Championship. He has featured in the top 20 of the Official World Golf Ranking. His best season on the European Tour was in 2005 when he finished third on the Order of Merit. He made the cut in 21 out of 23 events that year and gained his fourth and, to date, last European Tour victory in the season-ending Volvo Masters at the Valderrama Golf Club in Spain. McGinley started his final round four shots off the lead. He shot a final round of 67 for the biggest individual tournament win of his career, finishing two strokes ahead of Spain's Sergio García.

Before his victory in the 2005 Volvo Masters, McGinley had three runner-up finishes in tournaments that year, finishing second to Ángel Cabrera in the BMW Championship at Wentworth and losing in the final of the HSBC World Match Play Championship at the same venue to New Zealander Michael Campbell (2 & 1). In an absorbing contest, Campbell clinched the title with a half on the penultimate hole after McGinley had driven wildly into the trees on the previous two holes. McGinley later said he was "hurt like you can't imagine" after losing in the final. He said: "I fought as hard as I could and I'm bitterly disappointed."

At the 2005 TCL Classic, McGinley shot a final round of 63 to force a sudden-death playoff with Paul Casey. However, on the second extra hole, Casey holed a 25-foot birdie putt from the back of the green to win the title.

At the 2008 KLM Open played in the Netherlands, McGinley shot a final round of 64 to finish runner-up in the tournament, behind Darren Clarke.

=== Ryder Cup ===
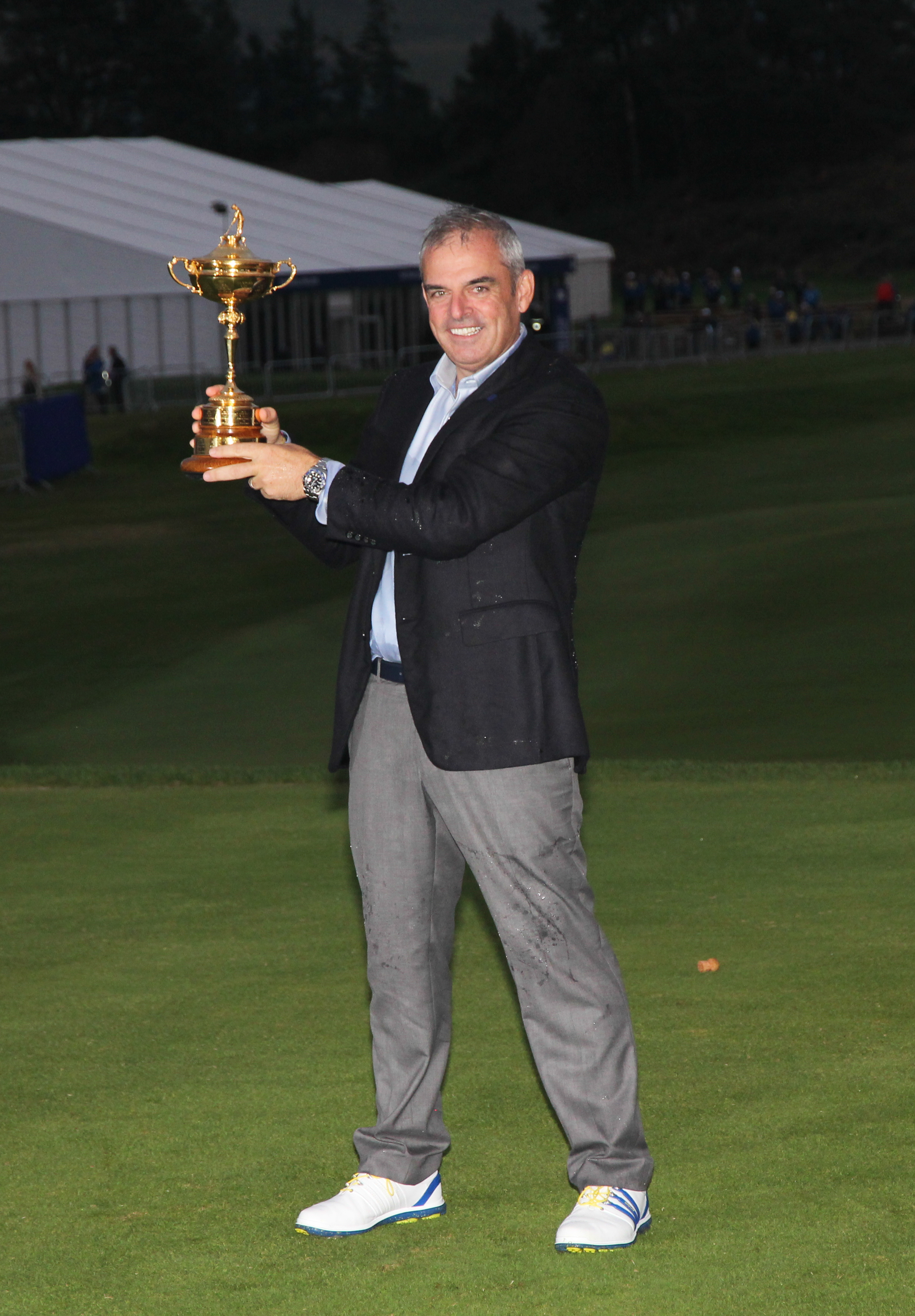
McGinley holding the Ryder Cup trophy in 2014.

McGinley made three consecutive Ryder Cup appearances in 2002, 2004 and 2006, with Europe being victorious each time. In the 2002 Ryder Cup, his ten-foot putt on the 18th hole in his match against Jim Furyk secured the ½ point Europe needed for victory; the team eventually won 15½ to 12½. In the 2006 Ryder Cup at The K Club in Ireland, McGinley offered a handshake and conceded a 20-foot putt for a half to J. J. Henry on the 18th green of his last-day singles match because he feared his opponent might have been put off when a streaker ran across the green.

In the 2010 and 2012 matches, McGinley served as one of the European vice-captains to Colin Montgomerie and José María Olazábal respectively. On 15 January 2013, he was named the Europe team captain for the 2014 Ryder Cup.

In May 2013, McGinley gave European player Sergio García his backing following a public feud that the Spaniard had with Tiger Woods and a controversial "fried chicken" remark that García made about Woods. In an interview with BBC Radio 5 Live, McGinley said: "I think there's a personality clash and they don't particularly like each other's company. For me, it's no big deal. He apologised for it and, as far as I'm concerned, we move on. People make mistakes and say things all the time that they regret and didn't mean." Garcia would eventually qualify for McGinley’s European squad, ahead of the Ryder Cup in September 2014.

At the 2014 Ryder Cup in Scotland, McGinley’s European team defeated the American team captained by Tom Watson with a winning margin of 16 1/2 to 11 1/2.

== Personal life ==
McGinley met his wife, Allison Shapcott, who played golf for England and on the Ladies European Tour, when they were both at United States International University in San Diego. They married in 1996 and have three children.

McGinley is an executive fellow of the Leadership Institute at the London Business School.

== Amateur wins ==
- 1988 Irish Youths Championship, Scottish Youths Championship
- 1989 Irish Amateur Close Championship
- 1991 South of Ireland Championship

== Professional wins (10) ==
=== European Tour wins (4) ===
Legend
Tour Championships (1)
Other European Tour (3)

No.	Date	Tournament	Winning score	Margin of victory	Runner(s)-up
1	11 Aug 1996	Hohe Brücke Open	−19 (73-66-68-62=269)	1 stroke	(England) David Lynn, (Spain) Juan Carlos Piñero
2	26 Oct 1997	Oki Pro-Am	−22 (66-67-64-69=266)	4 strokes	(England) Iain Pyman
3	12 Aug 2001	Celtic Manor Resort Wales Open	−6 (67-71=138) (Note: Shortened to 36 holes due to weather.)	Playoff	(Scotland) Paul Lawrie, (England) Daren Lee
4	30 Oct 2005	Volvo Masters	−10 (74-68-65-67=274)	2 strokes	(Spain) Sergio García

European Tour playoff record (1–3)

No.	Year	Tournament	Opponent(s)	Result
1	1993	Peugeot Open de France	(Italy) Costantino Rocca	Lost to bogey on first extra hole
2	1994	Turespaña Open Mediterrania	(Spain) José María Olazábal	Lost to birdie on second extra hole
3	2001	Celtic Manor Resort Wales Open	(Scotland) Paul Lawrie, (England) Daren Lee	Won with par on fifth extra hole Lawrie eliminated by par on second hole
4	2005	TCL Classic	(England) Paul Casey	Lost to birdie on second extra hole

=== Other wins (6) ===
No.	Date	Tournament	Winning score	Margin of victory	Runner(s)-up
1	13 Oct 1991	UAP European Under-25 Championship	−5 (70-69-74-70=283)	1 stroke	(Wales) Paul Affleck, (Denmark) René Michelsen
2	13 Oct 1997	Smurfit Irish PGA Championship	−3 (70-66-75-74=285)	3 strokes	(Northern Ireland) Stephen Hamill, (Republic of Ireland) David Higgins, (Republic of Ireland) John McHenry
3	23 Nov 1997	World Cup of Golf (with (Republic of Ireland) Pádraig Harrington)	−31 (137-137-136-135=545)	5 strokes	Scotland – Colin Montgomerie and Raymond Russell
4	8 Oct 2000	Smurfit Irish PGA Championship (2)	−18 (67-67-67-69=270)	4 strokes	(Republic of Ireland) Eamonn Darcy
5	27 Apr 2002	Smurfit Irish PGA Championship (3)	−6 (76-72-65=213)	3 strokes	(Republic of Ireland) John Dwyer
6	7 Sep 2003	Smurfit Irish PGA Championship (4)	−8 (71-68-69-72=280)	5 strokes	(Republic of Ireland) Gary Murphy

== Results in major championships ==
Tournament	1992	1993	1994	1995	1996	1997	1998	1999
Masters Tournament								
U.S. Open						CUT		
The Open Championship	CUT	CUT	CUT		T14	T66	CUT	CUT
PGA Championship								

Tournament	2000	2001	2002	2003	2004	2005	2006	2007	2008	2009
Masters Tournament			T18				CUT			
U.S. Open			CUT			T42	CUT			
The Open Championship	T20	T54	CUT	T28	T57	T41	CUT	19		T43
PGA Championship	CUT	T22	CUT	CUT	T6	T23		T60		

Tournament	2010	2011	2012	2013
Masters Tournament				
U.S. Open				
The Open Championship				
PGA Championship				CUT

Top 10
Did not play

CUT = missed the half-way cut
"T" = tied

=== Summary ===
Tournament	Wins	2nd	3rd	Top-5	Top-10	Top-25	Events	Cuts made
Masters Tournament	0	0	0	0	0	1	2	1
U.S. Open	0	0	0	0	0	0	4	1
The Open Championship	0	0	0	0	0	3	16	9
PGA Championship	0	0	0	0	1	3	8	4
Totals	0	0	0	0	1	7	30	15

- Most consecutive cuts made – 5 (2004 Open Championship – 2005 PGA)
- Longest streak of top-10s – 1 (twice)

== Results in The Players Championship ==
Tournament	2002	2003	2004	2005	2006
The Players Championship	CUT				CUT

Did not play

CUT = missed the halfway cut

== Results in World Golf Championships ==
Tournament	2000	2001	2002	2003	2004	2005	2006	2007	2008
Match Play		R64	R32				R64		
Championship	T35	NT^{1}			T28	T35			
Invitational	23	26	67	T58	T46	T3	T66	T39	T27

^{1}Cancelled due to 9/11

Top 10
Did not play

QF, R16, R32, R64 = Round in which player lost in match play
"T" = Tied
NT = No tournament

== Team appearances ==
Amateur

- Walker Cup (representing Great Britain & Ireland): 1991
- European Amateur Team Championship (representing Ireland): 1991

Professional

- Alfred Dunhill Cup (representing Ireland): 1993, 1994, 1996, 1997, 1998, 1999, 2000
- World Cup (representing Ireland): 1993, 1994, 1997 (winners), 1998, 1999, 2000, 2001, 2002, 2003, 2004, 2005, 2006, 2008
- Ryder Cup (representing Europe): 2002 (winners), 2004 (winners), 2006 (winners), 2014 (non-playing captain, winners)
  - Record: 9 matches, 4.5 points (50% Point Percentage)
  - All formats (W–L–H): 2–2–5 = 4.5pts
    - Singles: 1–0–2 = 2pts
    - Foursomes: 1–2–1 = 1.5pts
    - Fourballs: 0–0–2 = 1pt
- Seve Trophy (representing Great Britain & Ireland): 2002 (winners), 2005 (winners), 2009 (winners, non-playing captain), 2011 (winners, non-playing captain)
- Royal Trophy (representing Europe): 2006 (winners), 2007 (winners), 2009

== See also ==
- List of people on the postage stamps of Ireland
