= European Order of Merit =

Honour awarded by the European Union

In other official languages
Bulgarian	Европейския орден за заслуги
Czech	Evropský řád za zásluhy
Danish	Europæiske Fortjenstorden
German	Europäischer Verdienstorden
Greek	Ευρωπαϊκό Τάγμα Αξίας
Spanish	Orden Europea al Mérito
Estonian	Euroopa teenetemärk
Finnish	Euroopan ansioritarikunta
French	Ordre européen du Mérite
Irish	Ord Fiúntais na hEorpa
Croatian	Europski red za zasluge
Hungarian	Európai Érdemrend
Italian	Ordine europeo al merito
Lithuanian	Europos ordinas „Už nuopelnus“
Latvian	Eiropas Nopelnu ordenis
Maltese	Ordni Ewropew tal-Mertu
Dutch	Europese Orde van Verdienste
Polish	Europejski Order Zasługi
Portuguese	Ordem Europeia do Mérito
Romanian	Ordinul European de Merit
Slovak	Európsky rad za zásluhy
Slovene	Evropski red za zasluge
Swedish	Europeiska förtjänstorden
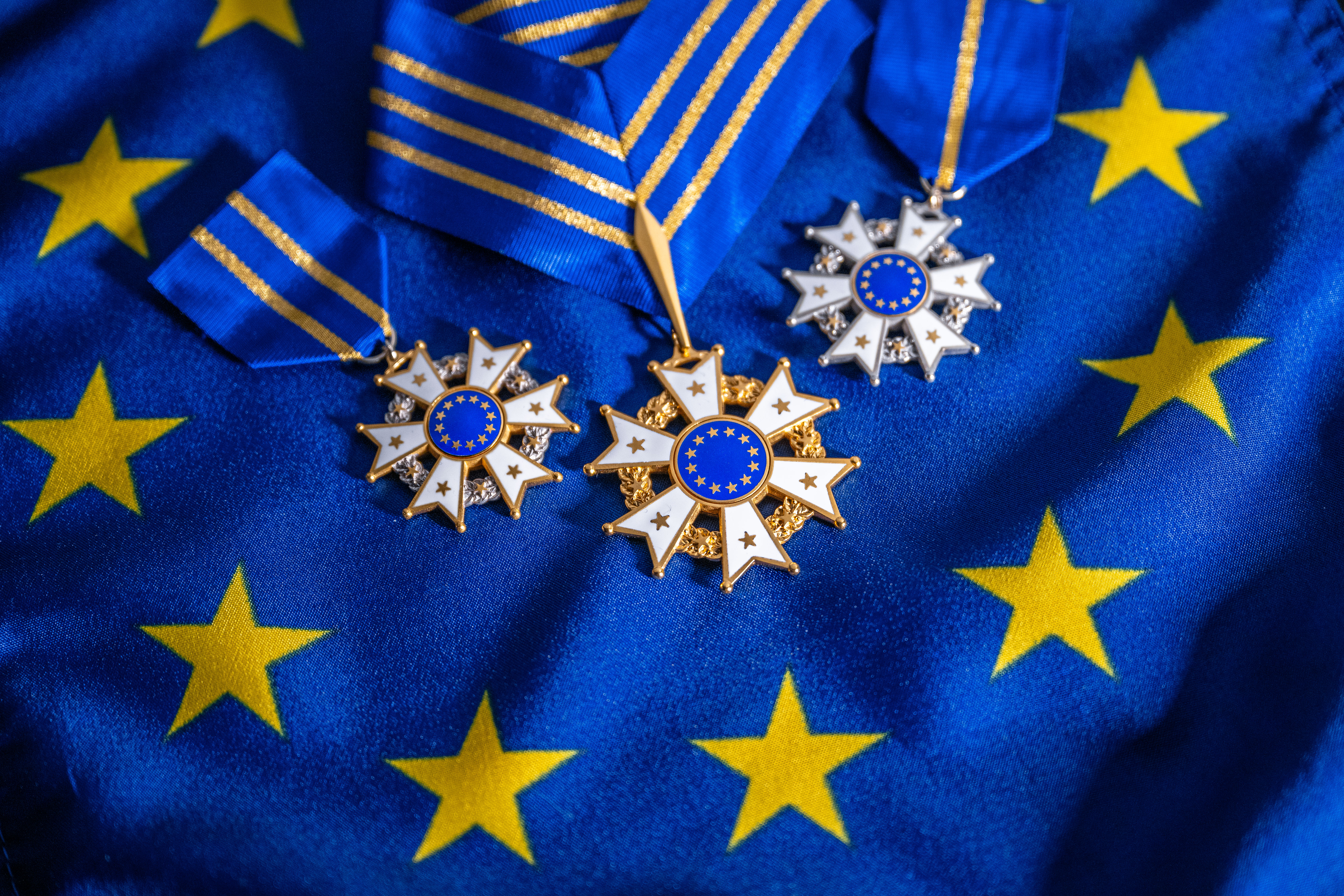

Awarded by The European Parliament
- Type: Order of merit
- Established: 5 May 2025; 18 months ago
- Country: European Union
- Seat: Strasbourg
- Eligibility: Individuals recognised for their significant contributions to European integration or for promoting and defending the values established in the European Union treaties.
- Status: Extant
- Founder: Bureau of the European Parliament
- Classes: Distinguished Member; Honourable Member; Member

Statistics
- First induction: 10 March 2026
- Last induction: 10 March 2026
- Total inductees: 20

The European Order of Merit is an order of merit awarded by the European Parliament. The order was founded on the 75th Anniversary of the Schuman Declaration in May 2025, the first appointments were in March 2026. The selections are made by a selection committee appointed by the Bureau of the European Parliament.

Only 20 people can be awarded the order each year. Elected members and civil servants of the institutions of the European Union cannot be awarded for the duration of their term or employment.

The European Order of Merit feature three classes.

The first inductees were awarded at a ceremony in Strasbourg on the 19 May 2026.

== Recipients ==
The first recipients of the order were announced on 10 March 2026.

=== Distinguished members ===
Name	Known for	Year of appointment
Angela Merkel	Chancellor of Germany	2026
Lech Wałęsa	President of Poland	2026
Volodymyr Zelenskyy	President of Ukraine	2026

=== Honourable members ===
Name	Known for	Year of appointment
Valdas Adamkus	President of Lithuania	2026
Jerzy Buzek	Prime Minister of Poland/President of the European Parliament	2026
Aníbal Cavaco Silva	President of Portugal	2026
Sauli Niinistö	President of Finland	2026
Pietro Parolin	Cardinal Secretary of State	2026
Mary Robinson	President of Ireland/High Commissioner for Human Rights	2026
Maia Sandu	President of Moldova	2026
Javier Solana y de Madariaga	High Representative for Common Foreign and Security Policy	2026
Wolfgang Schüssel	Chancellor of Austria	2026
Jean-Claude Trichet	President of the European Central Bank	2026

=== Members ===
Name	Known for	Year of appointment
José Andrés	Founder of World Central Kitchen	2026
Giannis Antetokounmpo	Basketball player	2026
Marc Gjidara	Professor, lawyer	2026
Sandra Lejniece	Latvian hematology professor	2026
Oleksandra Matviichuk	Lawyer and human rights activist	2026
Viviane Reding	Member of the European Commission	2026
Paul David Hewson	Musician, lyricist, philanthropist	2026

== Insignia and rights ==
The laureates of the order were awarded, in Strasbourg, at a ceremony in May where they were conferred a ribbon bar and badge. For Distinguished Members they will wear the badge from a collar.

Members are granted access to the gallery in the European Parliament.

Members may be degraded by the Selection Committee if found to have committed a criminal offence, shown the Union disrespect, or inappropriately used the order's insignia. Otherwise, Members may be withdrawn if appointed under a false pretense.

Ribbon bars
Distinguished Member	Honourable Member	Member

== Selection committee ==
Recipients are appointed by a selection committee. The committee sits for four years and is appointed by the Bureau of the European Parliament. There are seven members on the committee, being the President of the European Parliament, two Vice-Presidents of the European Parliament, and 4 prominent European public figures.

The incumbent committee:

- Roberta Metsola, President of the European Parliament
- Ewa Kopacz, Vice-President of the European Parliament
- Sophie Wilmès, Vice-President of the European Parliament
- Michel Barnier, French deputy and former French Prime Minister
- José Manuel Barroso, former President of the European Commission
- Josep Borrell, former President of the European Parliament and Vice-President of the European Commission
- Enrico Letta, former Prime Minister of Italy

== See also ==
- Charlemagne Prize
