= Royal Trophy =

Tournament information
- Location: 2013: Guangzhou, China
- Established: 2006
- Course: 2013: Dragon Lake Golf Club
- Par: 2013: 72
- Length: 2013: 6,968 yards (6,372 m)
- Format: Match play
- Month played: December
- Final year: 2013

Final champion
- Europe

The Royal Trophy was a men's professional team golf tournament which was played between 2006 and 2013. The competing teams represented Europe and Asia. Eight man teams played a series of 16 matches involving foursomes, four-ball and singles for the right to hold a trophy donated by the King of Thailand.

The first four contests, from 2006 to 2010, were played at the Amata Spring Country Club in Chonburi, Thailand. In 2011 the event moved to a different venue in Thailand and then moved to Brunei and China.

The Royal Trophy was one of several team golf tournaments between teams from different regions of the world started since the 1990s, inspired by the popularity of the Ryder Cup. In March 2014 the European Tour and the Asian Tour launched a new team tournament, the EurAsia Cup, also played between teams represented Europe and Asia. The Royal Trophy planned for December 2014 was cancelled and has not been held since.

== Event history ==
Seve Ballesteros, a leading proponent of team golf competitions, captained the European team in the inaugural tournament, and Japan's Masahiro Kuramoto captained Asia. Europe's team included the highly ranked David Howell and Paul McGinley, and former World Number 1s Nick Faldo and Ian Woosnam were Ballesteros's captain's picks. Europe won the inaugural event by 9 points to 7.

Europe retained the trophy in 2007 with a 12½–3½ victory. The 2008 event was due to take place from 11–13 January, but was postponed due to a 15-day period of national mourning for the King of Thailand's sister, and was ultimately cancelled. The third edition took place in January 2009 with the Asian team winning for the first time. In 2010, Europe regained the trophy, winning by the smallest possible margin, 8½–7½. Europe won again in 2011 but Asia won the trophy again in 2012 after a sudden-death play-off. Europe won the final edition in 2013, again by a small margin, 8½–7½.

== Format ==
The Royal Cup involved various match play competitions between players selected from two teams of eight. The winner of each match scored a point for his team, with half a point each for any match that was tied after the 18 holes. The winning team was determined by cumulative total points. In the event of a tie (8 points each) the Royal Cup was decided by a sudden-death playoff.

Year	Day 1		Day 2		Day 3		Total Points
Year	Morning	Afternoon	Morning	Afternoon	Morning	Afternoon	Total Points
2006-08	4 foursomes	4 fourballs	8 singles				16
2009-13	4 foursomes		4 fourballs		8 singles		16

== Results ==
Year	Venue	Winning team	Score	Europe captain	Asia captain
2014	Tournament cancelled				
2013	Dragon Lake Golf Club, China	Europe	8 1/2–7 1/2	(Spain) José María Olazábal	(South Korea) Yang Yong-eun
2012	Empire Hotel and Country Club, Brunei	Asia	8–8	(Spain) José María Olazábal	(Japan) Naomichi Ozaki
2011	Black Mountain Golf Club, Thailand	Europe	9–7	(Scotland) Colin Montgomerie	(Japan) Naomichi Ozaki
2010	Amata Spring Country Club, Thailand	Europe	8 1/2–7 1/2	(Scotland) Colin Montgomerie	(Japan) Naomichi Ozaki
2009	Amata Spring Country Club, Thailand	Asia	10–6	(Spain) José María Olazábal	(Japan) Naomichi Ozaki
2008	Tournament cancelled				
2007	Amata Spring Country Club, Thailand	Europe	12 1/2–3 1/2	(Spain) Seve Ballesteros	(Japan) Naomichi Ozaki
2006	Amata Spring Country Club, Thailand	Europe	9–7	(Spain) Seve Ballesteros	(Japan) Masahiro Kuramoto

== See also ==
- EurAsia Cup
