= Yeangder Tournament Players Championship =

Yeangder TPC
Tournament information
- Location: Linkou District, Taiwan
- Established: 2010
- Courses: Linkou International Golf and Country Club
- Par: 72
- Length: 7,108 yards (6,500 m)
- Tours: Asian Tour; Taiwan PGA Tour
- Format: Stroke play
- Prize fund: US$1,200,000
- Month played: September

Tournament record score
- Aggregate: 263 Pavit Tangkamolprasert (2026)
- To par: −25 as above

Current champion
- (Thailand) Pavit Tangkamolprasert

Location map
- Location in Taiwan

The Yeangder Tournament Players Championship is a golf tournament on the Asian Tour. It was played for the first time in September 2010 at the Linkou International Golf and Country Club in Taipei, Taiwan.

== Winners ==
Year	Tour(s) (Note: ASA − Asian Tour; TWN − Taiwan PGA Tour.)	Winner	Score	To par	Margin of victory	Runner(s)-up
Yeangder Tournament Players Championship
2026	ASA, TWN	(Thailand) Pavit Tangkamolprasert	263	−25	1 stroke	(Japan) Kazuki Higa
2025	ASA, TWN	(Japan) Kazuki Higa	271	−17	2 strokes	(United States) Charles Porter (Taiwan) Wang Wei-hsuan (Thailand) Rattanon Wannasrichan
Yeangder TPC
2024	ASA, TWN	(Thailand) Suteepat Prateeptienchai	267	−21	2 strokes	(United States) John Catlin
2023	ASA, TWN	(Thailand) Poom Saksansin	264	−24	3 strokes	(Australia) Travis Smyth
2022	ASA, TWN	(Australia) Travis Smyth	269	−19	2 strokes	(Taiwan) Lee Chieh-po
2021	TWN	(Taiwan) Lee Chieh-po	272	−16	1 stroke	(Taiwan) Chan Shih-chang
2020	TWN	Cancelled due to the COVID-19 pandemic				
Yeangder Tournament Players Championship
2019	ASA, TWN	(South Korea) Chang Yi-keun	267	−21	3 strokes	(Thailand) Kosuke Hamamoto
2018	ASA, TWN	(United States) John Catlin	273	−15	2 strokes	(United States) Sihwan Kim
2017	ASA, TWN	(India) Ajeetesh Sandhu	276	−12	1 stroke	(United States) Johannes Veerman
2016	ASA, TWN	(Spain) Carlos Pigem	276	−12	Playoff	(Japan) Shunya Takeyasu
2015	ASA, TWN	(South Africa) Shaun Norris	204 (Note: Shortened to 54 holes due to weather.)	−12	2 strokes	(Philippines) Miguel Tabuena
2014	ASA	(Thailand) Prom Meesawat	277	−11	Playoff	(Philippines) Miguel Tabuena
2013	ASA	(Thailand) Thaworn Wiratchant (2)	275	−13	1 stroke	(United States) Chan Kim
2012	ASA	(India) Gaganjeet Bhullar	204	−12	4 strokes	(United States) Jason Knutzon (Thailand) Thaworn Wiratchant
2011	ASA	(Taiwan) Lu Wei-chih	283	−5	1 stroke	(Taiwan) Lu Wen-teh
2010	ASA	(Thailand) Thaworn Wiratchant	206	−10	1 stroke	(Thailand) Chinnarat Phadungsil
