= Taifong Open =

Golf tournament in Taiwan

Taiwan Glass Taifong Open
Tournament information
- Location: Changhua County, Taiwan
- Established: 2005
- Course: Taifong Golf Club
- Par: 72
- Length: 7,109 yards (6,500 m)
- Tours: Asian Tour; Taiwan PGA Tour; Asian Development Tour
- Format: Stroke play
- Prize fund: US$500,000
- Month played: May

Current champion
- (South Africa) Ian Snyman

Location map
- Location in Taiwan

The Taifong Open is a professional golf tournament held at Taifong Golf Club in Changhua County, Taiwan. First played in 2005, it was initially sanctioned by the local professional tour in Taiwan before becoming a jointly sanctioned Asian Development Tour event in 2014. The tournament was promoted to the Asian Tour schedule in 2023.

The event has been played at Taifong Golf Club since its inception. Chan Shih-chang holds the record for most wins, with victories in 2010, 2014 and 2018. In 2026, South Africa's Ian Snyman won the tournament for his first Asian Tour title, finishing at 15-under-par and two strokes ahead of Santiago de la Fuente and Matthew Cheung.

== History ==
The tournament was first played in 2005, when Yeh Wei-tze became its inaugural winner. In its early years, the event was sanctioned by the Taiwan PGA Tour and was won by several Taiwanese golfers, including Chan Yih-shin, Lu Wei-chih, Lu Chien-soon and Chan Shih-chang.

After a three-year hiatus, the tournament returned in 2014 as a jointly sanctioned event on the Asian Development Tour and the Taiwan PGA Tour. Chan won the 2014 edition, successfully defending the title he had won in 2010, and later won the tournament for a third time in 2018.

The tournament remained on the ADT schedule through 2022 and was among the most lucrative events on that tour. It was held as a local event in 2020 and 2021 because of travel restrictions during the COVID-19 pandemic, with Hung Chien-yao winning in 2020 and Lee Chieh-po winning in 2021.

The event moved onto the Asian Tour schedule in 2023. Suteepat Prateeptienchai won the 2023 edition for his first Asian Tour title, then successfully defended the title in 2024. Ekpharit Wu won in 2025, becoming the third consecutive Thai winner of the tournament since its promotion to the Asian Tour.

== Venue ==
The tournament is held at Taifong Golf Club in Changhua County, Taiwan. The course has been the tournament's permanent home since the event was first played in 2005. The course was designed by Japanese architect Hiroshi Watanabe and opened in 1977.

For the 2026 edition, the course was set up as a par-72 layout measuring 7,109 yards.

== Winners ==
Year	Tour(s) (Note: ASA − Asian Tour; ADT − Asian Development Tour; TWN − Taiwan PGA Tour)	Winner	Score	To par	Margin of victory	Runner(s)-up	Ref.
Taiwan Glass Taifong Open
2026	ASA, TWN	(South Africa) Ian Snyman	273	−15	2 strokes	(Hong Kong) Matthew Cheung (Mexico) Santiago de la Fuente	
2025	ASA, TWN	(Thailand) Ekpharit Wu	268	−20	2 strokes	(Taiwan) Hung Chien-yao	
2024	ASA, TWN	(Thailand) Suteepat Prateeptienchai (2)	266	−22	1 stroke	(Thailand) Runchanapong Youprayong	
2023	ASA, TWN	(Thailand) Suteepat Prateeptienchai	269	−19	4 strokes	(Malaysia) Shahriffuddin Ariffin (Thailand) Atiruj Winaicharoenchai	
Taifong Open
2022	ADT, TWN	(Taiwan) Hung Chien-yao (2)	277	−11	5 strokes	(England) Joe Heraty (Thailand) Suteepat Prateeptienchai	
2021	TWN	(Taiwan) Lee Chieh-po	273	−11	5 strokes	(Taiwan) Hung Chien-yao	
2020	TWN	(Taiwan) Hung Chien-yao	269	−19	9 strokes	(Taiwan) Yeh Yu-chen	
2019	ADT, TWN	(Thailand) Donlaphatchai Niyomchon	207 (Note: Shortened to 54 holes due to weather.)	−9	2 strokes	(Taiwan) Chang Wei-lun (Taiwan) Tseng Tzu-hsuan (Thailand) Atiruj Winaicharoenchai (Japan) Daisuke Yasumoto	
2018	ADT, TWN	(Taiwan) Chan Shih-chang (3)	275	−13	2 strokes	(United States) Han Lee (Thailand) Chinnarat Phadungsil	
2017	ADT, TWN	(Thailand) Pannakorn Uthaipas	275	−13	3 strokes	(Australia) Marcus Both (Thailand) Gunn Charoenkul (Taiwan) Lin Wen-tang	
2016	ADT, TWN	(United States) Johannes Veerman	210 (Note: Shortened to 54 holes due to Typhoon Nepartak.)	−6	Playoff	(Taiwan) Chang Wei-lun	
2015	ADT, TWN	(Thailand) Rattanon Wannasrichan	276	−12	1 stroke	(United States) Casey O'Toole (Australia) Jordan Sherratt	
2014	ADT, TWN	(Taiwan) Chan Shih-chang (2)	212	−4	Playoff	(Taiwan) Hsieh Tung-shu (Taiwan) Sung Mao-chang (Philippines) Miguel Tabuena (Thailand) Suppakorn Uthaipat	
2011–13: No tournament							
2010	TWN	(Taiwan) Chan Shih-chang	206	−10	Playoff	(Taiwan) Lin Wen-ko	
2009	TWN	(Taiwan) Lu Chien-soon	280	−8	2 strokes	(Taiwan) Hsieh Tung-shu (Taiwan) Lu Wei-chih	
2008: No tournament							
2007	TWN	(Taiwan) Lu Wei-chih	138 (Note: Shortened to 36 holes due to Typhoon Pabuk.)	−6	Playoff	(Taiwan) Chan Yih-shin	
2006	TWN	(Taiwan) Chan Yih-shin	271	−17			
2005	TWN	(Taiwan) Yeh Wei-tze	273	−15			
