= Mercuries Taiwan Masters =

Tournament information
- Location: Tamsui, Taiwan
- Established: 1987
- Courses: Taiwan Golf and Country Club
- Par: 72
- Length: 6,923 yards (6,330 m)
- Tours: Asian Tour; Taiwan PGA Tour
- Format: Stroke play
- Prize fund: US$1,000,000
- Month played: September

Tournament record score
- Aggregate: 273 Chan Shih-chang (2022); 273 Rashid Khan (2022)
- To par: −15 as above

Current champion
- (Taiwan) Hung Chien-yao

Location map
- Location in Taiwan

The Mercuries Taiwan Masters (三商台灣名人賽) is an annual golf tournament held in Taiwan. It was founded in 1987 and has been an Asian Tour event since 2000.

== Winners ==
Year	Tour (Note: ASA − Asian Tour; TWN − Taiwan PGA Tour.)	Winner	Score	To par	Margin of victory	Runner(s)-up
Mercuries Taiwan Masters
2026	ASA, TWN	(Taiwan) Hung Chien-yao	280	−8	1 stroke	(Australia) Wade Ormsby
2025	ASA, TWN	(Thailand) Rattanon Wannasrichan	283	−5	1 stroke	(Thailand) Suradit Yongcharoenchai
2024	ASA, TWN	(South Africa) Jbe' Kruger	208 (Note: Shortened to 54 holes due to Typhoon Krathon.)	−8	2 strokes	(Thailand) Pavit Tangkamolprasert (South Korea) Wang Jeung-hun
2023	ASA, TWN	(South Africa) Jaco Ahlers	284	−4	2 strokes	(India) S. Chikkarangappa
2022	ASA, TWN	(Taiwan) Chan Shih-chang	273	−15	Playoff	(India) Rashid Khan
2021	TWN	(Taiwan) Wang Wei-hsiang	287	−1	1 stroke	(Taiwan) Chi Huang
2020	~~ASA~~, (Note: Tournament held without Asian Tour sanctioning due to the COVID-19 pandemic.) TWN	(Taiwan) Wang Wei-hsuan	278	−10	3 strokes	(Taiwan) Chan Shih-chang (Taiwan) Lee Chieh-po
Mercuries Taiwan Masters
2019	ASA, TWN	(Thailand) Suradit Yongcharoenchai	278	−10	1 stroke	(Brazil) Adilson da Silva (India) Ajeetesh Sandhu (Philippines) Miguel Tabuena
2018	ASA, TWN	(Brazil) Adilson da Silva	281	−7	1 stroke	(United States) Berry Henson (Taiwan) Lin Wen-tang
2017	ASA, TWN	(Malaysia) Gavin Green	279	−9	2 strokes	(Brazil) Adilson da Silva (South Africa) Keith Horne (Philippines) Juvic Pagunsan (Zimbabwe) Scott Vincent
2016	ASA, TWN	(Taiwan) Lu Wei-chih (3)	283	−5	1 stroke	(Philippines) Miguel Tabuena
2015	ASA, TWN	(Malaysia) Danny Chia	285	−3	2 strokes	(China) Liang Wenchong
2014	ASA	(England) Steve Lewton	283	−5	2 strokes	(Brazil) Adilson da Silva (Philippines) Antonio Lascuña
2013	ASA	(Australia) Scott Hend	285	−3	4 strokes	(United States) Sam Cyr
2012	ASA	(Taiwan) Tsai Chi-huang (2)	284	−4	4 strokes	(Philippines) Antonio Lascuña
2011	ASA	(Taiwan) Lu Wei-chih (2)	278	−10	3 strokes	(Thailand) Thaworn Wiratchant
2010	ASA	(Thailand) Pariya Junhasavasdikul	286	−2	Playoff	(Bangladesh) Siddikur Rahman
2009	ASA	(Taiwan) Lin Wen-tang	280	−8	3 strokes	(Taiwan) Lu Wen-teh
2008	ASA	(Taiwan) Lu Wen-teh (4)	277	−11	2 strokes	(Thailand) Thaworn Wiratchant
2007	ASA	(Taiwan) Lu Wen-teh (3)	284	−4	3 strokes	(South Korea) Ted Oh
2006	ASA	(India) Gaurav Ghei	278	−10	1 stroke	(India) Rahil Gangjee
2005	ASA	(Taiwan) Lu Wei-chih	284	−4	2 strokes	(Taiwan) Lin Wen-tang
2004	ASA	(Thailand) Thaworn Wiratchant	283	−5	2 strokes	(Taiwan) Chen Yuan-chi (South Africa) Chris Williams
2003	ASA	(Taiwan) Lin Wen-ko	280	−8	1 stroke	(Thailand) Thongchai Jaidee
2002	ASA	(Taiwan) Tsai Chi-huang	274	−14	5 strokes	(Taiwan) Lu Wen-teh
2001	ASA	(Sweden) Daniel Chopra	284	−4	1 stroke	(India) Vivek Bhandari
2000	ASA	(Taiwan) Lin Keng-chi	283	−5	2 strokes	(United States) Gerry Norquist
Taiwan Masters
1999		(Taiwan) Yeh Chang-ting				
1998		(Thailand) Boonchu Ruangkit				
1997		(United States) Gerry Norquist	278	−10	5 strokes	(Taiwan) Tsao Chien-teng
1996		(Taiwan) Lu Wen-teh (2)				
1995		(Taiwan) Hsieh Chin-sheng				
1994		(Taiwan) Lu Wen-teh				
1993		(Taiwan) Hsieh Yu-shu				
1992		(Taiwan) Hsieh Min-Nan				
1991		(Taiwan) Wang Ter-chang				
1990		(Taiwan) Yuan Ching-chi				
1989		(Taiwan) Chen Tze-chung				
1988		(Taiwan) Kuo Chie-Hsiung				
1987		(Taiwan) Chen Liang-hsi				

== See also ==
- List of sporting events in Taiwan
