= Royal Greens Golf & Country Club =

Coordinates: 22.449°N 39.1°E

- Interactive map of Royal Greens Golf & Country Club

Club information
- Location: King Abdullah Economic City, Saudi Arabia
- Established: 2017
- Operator: Troon Golf
- Tota holes: 18
- Tournaments: Saudi International; LIV Golf Jeddah; Aramco Team Series; Aramco Saudi Ladies International
- Website: royalgreens.net

Championship course
- Designed by: European Golf Design
- Par: 72
- Length: 7,010 yards (6,410 m)

Royal Greens Golf & Country Club is a golf club located in King Abdullah Economic City, around 100 km north of Jeddah, Saudi Arabia. It has hosted tournaments on the European Tour, Asian Tour, the Ladies European Tour, and LIV Golf.

== History ==
The 18-hole championship golf course, playing to a 72 par and a maximum length of just over 7,000 yards, officially opened in September 2017. It sits on the Red Sea coast and was designed by European Golf Design (EGD) and is managed by Troon Golf, the world's largest operator of competition grade courses.

== Scorecard ==
Royal Greens Golf & Country Club
Tee	Rating/Slope	1	2	3	4	5	6	7	8	9	Out	10	11	12	13	14	15	16	17	18	In	Total
Men's		361	439	208	569	427	470	381	173	498	3526	372	164	459	492	433	427	180	350	607	3484	7010
Par	Men's	4	4	3	5	4	4	4	3	4	35	4	3	4	4	4	4	3	4	5	35	70
Women's		357	392	162	479	384	361	336	147	464	3082	366	140	386	473	364	397	158	308	505	3097	6179
Par	Women's	4	4	3	5	4	4	4	3	5	36	4	3	4	5	4	4	3	4	5	36	72

Scorecard from the 2020 Saudi International and the 2022 Saudi Ladies International.

== International tournaments ==
The club has hosted several international championships, including the Saudi International on the European Tour and later the Asian Tour, and the Saudi Ladies International and Saudi Ladies Team International on the Ladies European Tour.

=== Winners ===
Year	Tour (Note: ASA − Asian Tour; EUR − European Tour; LET − Ladies European Tour; LIV − LIV Golf League.)	Tournament	Winner	Purse ($)
2019	EUR	Saudi International	(United States) Dustin Johnson	3,500,000
2020	EUR	Saudi International	(Northern Ireland) Graeme McDowell	3,500,000
2020	LET	Aramco Saudi Ladies International	(Denmark) Emily Kristine Pedersen	1,000,000
2020	LET	Saudi Ladies Team International	(Denmark) Emily Kristine Pedersen	1,000,000
2021	EUR	Saudi International	(United States) Dustin Johnson	3,500,000
2021	LET	Aramco Saudi Ladies International	(New Zealand) Lydia Ko	1,000,000
2021	LET	Aramco Team Series – Jeddah	(Slovenia) Pia Babnik	1,000,000
2022	ASA	Saudi International	(United States) Harold Varner III	5,000,000
2022	LET	Aramco Saudi Ladies International	(England) Georgia Hall	1,000,000
2022	LIV	LIV Golf Invitational Jeddah	(United States) Brooks Koepka	25,000,000
2022	LET	Aramco Team Series – Jeddah	(Germany) Chiara Noja	1,000,000
2023	ASA	Saudi International	(Mexico) Abraham Ancer	5,000,000
2023	LET	Aramco Saudi Ladies International	(New Zealand) Lydia Ko	5,000,000
2023	LIV	LIV Golf Jeddah	(United States) Brooks Koepka	25,000,000
2024	LIV	LIV Golf Jeddah		25,000,000

== Awards and recognition ==
In addition, Royal Greens Golf & Country Club has won numerous awards, such as Saudi Arabia's Best Golf Course and Middle East's Best Golf Course at the 2021 World Golf Awards.
