= 2024 Asian Tour =

Golf tour season

2024 Asian Tour season
- Duration: 15 February 2024 – 7 December 2024
- Number of official events: 21 (Note: One further tournament was scheduled but was removed from the schedule.)
- Most wins: (United States) John Catlin (2) (Note: Peter Uihlein also won two events, but was not an Asian Tour member.) (Thailand) Suteepat Prateeptienchai (2)
- Order of Merit: (United States) John Catlin
- International Series Order of Merit: (Chile) Joaquín Niemann
- Player of the Year: (United States) John Catlin
- Rookie of the Year: (Italy) Stefano Mazzoli

The 2024 Asian Tour was the 29th season of the modern Asian Tour (formerly the Asian PGA Tour), the main professional golf tour in Asia (outside of Japan) since it was established in 1995.

== Changes for 2024 ==
New tournaments for the 2024 season included the International Series Macau and the Black Mountain Championship. Additionally, in February 2024, it was confirmed that a new tournament in a new continent to the Asian Tour, would be added to the schedule; the Karen Classic to be played in August at Karen Country Club in Kenya. However, the tournament was later removed from the schedule and did not take place.

The DGC Open and the World City Championship from the 2023 schedule were dropped for the 2024 season.

== Schedule ==
The following table lists official events during the 2024 season.

Date	Tournament	Host country	Purse (US$)	Winner (Note: The number in brackets after each winner's name is the number of Asian Tour events they had won up to and including that tournament. This information is only shown for Asian Tour members.)	OWGR points	Other tours (Note: ANZ − PGA Tour of Australasia; JPN − Japan Golf Tour; KOR − Korean Tour; TWN − Taiwan PGA Tour.)	Notes
18 Feb	IRS Prima Malaysian Open	Malaysia	1,000,000	(Spain) David Puig (2)	9.21		
25 Feb	International Series Oman	Oman	2,000,000	(Mexico) Carlos Ortiz (n/a)	15.31		International Series
3 Mar	New Zealand Open	New Zealand	NZ$2,000,000	(Japan) Takahiro Hataji (1)	6.63	ANZ	
17 Mar	International Series Macau	Macau	2,000,000	(United States) John Catlin (5)	14.70		International Series (Note: Also a new tournament.)
20 Apr	Saudi Open	Saudi Arabia	1,000,000	(United States) John Catlin (6)	8.37		
5 May	GS Caltex Maekyung Open	South Korea	₩1,300,000,000	(South Korea) Kim Hong-taek (1)	7.51	KOR	
23 Jun	Kolon Korea Open	South Korea	₩1,400,000,000	(South Korea) Kim Min-kyu (2)	7.74	KOR	
7 Jul	International Series Morocco	Morocco	2,000,000	(New Zealand) Ben Campbell (2)	7.75		International Series
11 Aug	International Series England	England	2,000,000	(United States) Peter Uihlein (n/a)	10.42		International Series
~~18 Aug~~	Karen Classic	Kenya	–	Removed	–		New tournament
1 Sep	Mandiri Indonesia Open	Indonesia	500,000	(England) Steve Lewton (2)	4.50		
8 Sep	Shinhan Donghae Open	South Korea	₩1,400,000,000	(Japan) Kensei Hirata (n/a)	9.05	JPN, KOR	
29 Sep	Yeangder TPC	Taiwan	1,000,000	(Thailand) Suteepat Prateeptienchai (2)	6.13	TWN	
6 Oct	Mercuries Taiwan Masters	Taiwan	1,000,000	(South Africa) Jbe' Kruger (3)	4.22	TWN	
13 Oct	SJM Macao Open	Macau	1,000,000	(Thailand) Rattanon Wannasrichan (2)	6.89		
20 Oct	Black Mountain Championship	Thailand	2,000,000	(United States) M. J. Maguire (1)	7.85		International Series
27 Oct	International Series Thailand	Thailand	2,000,000	(Taiwan) Lee Chieh-po (1)	8.65		International Series
3 Nov	BNI Indonesian Masters	Indonesia	2,000,000	(Canada) Richard T. Lee (3)	8.13		International Series
17 Nov	Taiwan Glass Taifong Open	Taiwan	400,000	(Thailand) Suteepat Prateeptienchai (3)	3.38	TWN	
24 Nov	Link Hong Kong Open	Hong Kong	2,000,000	(United States) Patrick Reed (n/a)	10.12		International Series
30 Nov	International Series Qatar	Qatar	2,500,000	(United States) Peter Uihlein (n/a)	11.32		International Series
7 Dec	PIF Saudi International	Saudi Arabia	5,000,000	(Chile) Joaquín Niemann (n/a)	21.32		International Series

== Order of Merit ==
The Order of Merit was based on tournament results during the season, calculated using a points-based system.

Position	Player	Points
1	(United States) John Catlin	3,130
2	(New Zealand) Ben Campbell	2,049
3	(Canada) Richard T. Lee	1,818
4	(Taiwan) Lee Chieh-po	1,637
5	(Thailand) Suteepat Prateeptienchai	1,453

== International Series Order of Merit ==
The International Series Order of Merit was based on tournament results during the season, calculated using a points-based system. The leading player on the International Series Order of Merit earned status to play in the 2025 LIV Golf League. (Note: As Niemann was already contracted with LIV Golf for the 2025 season, nobody from the 2024 International Series Order of Merit was promoted.)

Position	Player	Points
1	(Chile) Joaquín Niemann	1,126
2	(United States) Peter Uihlein	1,113
3	(New Zealand) Ben Campbell	1,087
4	(United States) John Catlin	963
5	(Canada) Richard T. Lee	704

== Awards ==
Award	Winner	Ref.
Player of the Year (Kyi Hla Han Award)	(United States) John Catlin	
Rookie of the Year	(Italy) Stefano Mazzoli	

== See also ==
- 2024 Asian Development Tour
