= Travis Smyth =

Australian professional golfer (born 1994)

Personal information
- Nationality: Australia
- Born: 29 December 1994 (age 31) Shellharbour, New South Wales, Australia
- Height: 6 ft 4 in (1.93 m)

Career
- Sport: Golf
- Turned professional: 2017
- Current tours: European Tour; Asian Tour; PGA Tour of Australasia
- Former tour: LIV Golf
- Professional wins: 4

Number of wins by tour
- Japan Golf Tour: 1
- Asian Tour: 2
- PGA Tour of Australasia: 2

Best results in major championships
- Masters Tournament: DNP
- PGA Championship: CUT: 2026
- U.S. Open: DNP
- The Open Championship: CUT: 2023, 2026

Achievements and awards
- PGA Tour of Australasia Order of Merit winner: 2025–26

Travis Smyth (born 29 December 1994) is an Australian professional golfer who plays on the Asian Tour. He won the 2017 Northern Territory PGA Championship and the 2022 Yeangder TPC, as well as recording a runner-up finish at the 2022 International Series England. He played in the first three LIV Golf events in 2022, having gained access through the Asian Tour qualification process.

== Early life and amateur career ==
Smyth grew up in Shellharbour, New South Wales, a small beach town about an hour and a half south of Sydney. He didn’t start to play golf until the age of 12, but he enjoyed a strong amateur career representing Australia on several occasions, and quickly rose through the amateur ranks. He won the 2015 Riversdale Cup and was runner-up at the 2016 Australian Amateur, and rose to 11th in the World Amateur Golf Ranking in 2017.

Still an amateur, Smyth was runner-up at the 2016 Western Australian Open two strokes behind Curtis Luck, and won his first professional event during the 2017 PGA Tour of Australasia season, the Northern Territory PGA Championship.

Smyth was in contention at the 2017 U.S. Amateur at Bel-Air Country Club in Los Angeles. He beat Will Zalatoris in the round of 16 to advance to the final eight, but lost 1 down in the quarterfinal to eventual champion Doc Redman.

== Professional career ==
Smyth turned professional in late 2017 and joined the Asian Tour after tying for 3rd at the 2018 Asian Tour Qualifying School. He finished in the top-50 on the Order of Merit in 2018 and 2019.

On the PGA Tour of Australasia, Smyth lost a playoff at the 2019 New South Wales Open and tied for 3rd at the 2020 ISPS Handa Vic Open, a European Tour co-sanctioned event.

=== LIV Golf ===
Smyth recorded his best Asian Tour finish at the time, at the inaugural International Series England in June 2022. He finished in second place, one stroke behind Scott Vincent to collect US$220,000. The tournament also served as a qualifier for the first LIV Golf event, and the top-6 finishers were invited to play at the LIV Golf Invitational London. He finished runner-up in the team event at LIV London the following week together with Peter Uihlein, Richard Bland and Phachara Khongwatmai to collect US$525,000. In total, Smyth appeared in three 2022 LIV Golf Invitational Series events, finishing T33, T29 and 22nd, to collect a combined US$850,000.

Smyth invested the prize money back into his career and his team. He started 2023 with a tie for 6th at the PIF Saudi International and a solo 3rd at the World City Championship at the Hong Kong Golf Club. A qualifying event for the 2023 Open Championship at Royal Liverpool Golf Club, he secured a start in his first major championship through his Hong Kong finish.

== Amateur wins ==
- 2014 Queensland Stroke Play & Amateur Championship
- 2015 Riversdale Cup
- 2017 NSW Amateur

== Professional wins (4) ==
=== Asian Tour wins (2) ===
Legend
International Series (1)
Other Asian Tour (1)

No.	Date	Tournament	Winning score	Margin of victory	Runner(s)-up
1	25 Sep 2022	Yeangder TPC^{1}	−19 (68-69-66-66=269)	2 strokes	(Taiwan) Lee Chieh-po
2	5 Apr 2026	International Series Japan	−15 (71-66-68-64=269)	1 stroke	(Japan) Ryosuke Kinoshita, (Thailand) Pavit Tangkamolprasert

^{1}Co-sanctioned by the Taiwan PGA Tour

=== PGA Tour of Australasia wins (2) ===
No.	Date	Tournament	Winning score	Margin of victory	Runner-up
1	3 Sep 2017	Northern Territory PGA Championship (as an amateur)	−19 (64-68-66-67=265)	6 strokes	(Australia) Deyen Lawson
2	8 Mar 2026	ISPS Handa Japan-Australasia Championship^{1}	−15 (72-67-67-67=273)	Playoff	(Australia) Jack Thompson

^{1}Co-sanctioned by the Japan Golf Tour

PGA Tour of Australasia playoff record (1–1)

No.	Year	Tournament	Opponent	Result
1	2019	AVJennings NSW Open	(Australia) Josh Younger	Lost to birdie on second extra hole
2	2026	ISPS Handa Japan-Australasia Championship	(Australia) Jack Thompson	Won with par on sixth extra hole

== Results in major championships ==
Tournament	2023	2024	2025	2026
Masters Tournament				
PGA Championship				CUT
U.S. Open				
The Open Championship	CUT			CUT

Did not play

CUT = missed the half-way cut

== Team appearances ==
Amateur

- Australian Men's Interstate Teams Matches (representing New South Wales): 2014, 2015, 2016 (winners), 2017
