= 2016 Asian Tour =

Golf tour season

2016 Asian Tour season
- Duration: 29 January 2016 – 11 December 2016
- Number of official events: 23
- Most wins: (Taiwan) Chan Shih-chang (2) (India) Shiv Chawrasia (2) (Australia) Scott Hend (2)
- Order of Merit: (Australia) Scott Hend
- Players' Player of the Year: (Australia) Scott Hend
- Rookie of the Year: (Zimbabwe) Scott Vincent

The 2016 Asian Tour was the 22nd season of the modern Asian Tour (formerly the Asian PGA Tour), the main professional golf tour in Asia (outside of Japan) since it was established in 1995.

== European Tour strategic alliance ==
In July, it was announced that the European Tour had entered into a strategic alliance with the Asian Tour.

== Schedule ==
The following table lists official events during the 2016 season.

Date	Tournament	Host country	Purse (US$)	Winner (Note: The number in brackets after each winner's name is the number of Asian Tour events they had won up to and including that tournament. This information is only shown for Asian Tour members.)	OWGR points	Other tours (Note: AFR − Sunshine Tour; ANZ − PGA Tour of Australasia; EUR − European Tour; JPN − Japan Golf Tour; KOR − Korean Tour; PGAT − PGA Tour; PGTI − Professional Golf Tour of India; TWN − Taiwan PGA Tour.)	Notes
1 Feb	SMBC Singapore Open	Singapore	1,000,000	(South Korea) Song Young-han (1)	28	JPN	
7 Feb	Leopalace21 Myanmar Open	Myanmar	750,000	(South Africa) Shaun Norris (2)	15	JPN	
14 Feb	Bashundhara Bangladesh Open	Bangladesh	300,000	(Thailand) Thitiphun Chuayprakong (1)	14		
21 Feb	Maybank Championship Malaysia	Malaysia	3,000,000	(Australia) Marcus Fraser (2)	38	EUR	New tournament
28 Feb	ISPS Handa Perth International	Australia	A$1,750,000	(South Africa) Louis Oosthuizen (2)	23	ANZ, EUR	New to Asian Tour
13 Mar	True Thailand Classic	Thailand	1,750,000	(Australia) Scott Hend (8)	24	EUR	
20 Mar	Hero Indian Open	India	1,660,000	(India) Shiv Chawrasia (4)	19	EUR	
24 Apr	Panasonic Open Golf Championship	Japan	¥150,000,000	(Japan) Yuta Ikeda (n/a)	16	JPN	
15 May	AfrAsia Bank Mauritius Open	Mauritius	€1,000,000	(South Korea) Wang Jeung-hun (1)	17	AFR, EUR	
19 Jun	Queen's Cup	Thailand	300,000	(Australia) Scott Hend (9)	14		
3 Jul	Yeangder Tournament Players Championship	Taiwan	500,000	(Spain) Carlos Pigem (1)	14	TWN	
31 Jul	King's Cup	Thailand	750,000	(Taiwan) Chan Shih-chang (1)	14	EUR	
4 Sep	Omega European Masters	Switzerland	€2,700,000	(Sweden) Alex Norén (n/a)	30	EUR	
25 Sep	Asia-Pacific Diamond Cup Golf	Japan	¥150,000,000	(Taiwan) Chan Shih-chang (2)	15	JPN	
2 Oct	Mercuries Taiwan Masters	Taiwan	800,000	(Taiwan) Lu Wei-chih (4)	14	TWN	
2 Oct	Shinhan Donghae Open	South Korea	₩1,200,000,000	(India) Gaganjeet Bhullar (6)	18	KOR	
9 Oct	BNI Indonesian Masters	Indonesia	750,000	(Thailand) Poom Saksansin (1)	14		
16 Oct	Venetian Macao Open	Macau	1,100,000	(Thailand) Pavit Tangkamolprasert (1)	16		
23 Oct	CIMB Classic	Malaysia	7,000,000	(United States) Justin Thomas (n/a)	50	PGAT	Limited-field event
13 Nov	Resorts World Manila Masters	Philippines	1,000,000	(India) Shiv Chawrasia (5)	14		
20 Nov	Bank BRI-JCB Indonesia Open	Indonesia	300,000	(India) Gaganjeet Bhullar (7)	14		
4 Dec	Panasonic Open India	India	400,000	(India) Mukesh Kumar (1)	14	PGTI	
11 Dec	UBS Hong Kong Open	Hong Kong	2,000,000	(Australia) Sam Brazel (1)	32	EUR	

== Order of Merit ==
The Order of Merit was based on prize money won during the season, calculated in U.S. dollars.

Position	Player	Prize money ($)
1	(Australia) Scott Hend	1,004,793
2	(Australia) Marcus Fraser	730,023
3	(South Korea) Wang Jeung-hun	546,193
4	(Taiwan) Chan Shih-chang	542,821
5	(Philippines) Miguel Tabuena	525,926

== Awards ==
Award	Winner	Ref.
Players' Player of the Year	(Australia) Scott Hend	
Rookie of the Year	(Zimbabwe) Scott Vincent	

== See also ==
- 2016 Asian Development Tour
