= Taiwan PGA Tour seasons =

This page lists all Taiwan PGA Tour seasons.

Since its inception, most tournaments on the Taiwan PGA Tour have been played in Taiwan.

== 2026 season ==
=== Schedule ===
The following table lists official events during the 2026 season.

Date	Tournament	Location	Purse (NT$)	Winner (Note: The number in brackets after each winner's name is the number of Taiwan PGA Tour events they had won up to and including that tournament.)	OWGR points	Other tours (Note: ADT − Asian Development Tour; ASA − Asian Tour.)
28 Mar	Chang Wah Open	Kaohsiung	3,000,000	(Taiwan) Ian Peng (1)	1.51	
10 May	Taiwan Glass Taifong Open	Taichung	US$500,000	(South Africa) Ian Snyman (n/a)	7.43	ASA
17 May	Sun Flower TPGA Championship	New Taipei	7,000,000	(Taiwan) Chang Wei-lun (7)	1.61	
30 May	Giant Open	Hsinchu	3,000,000	(Taiwan) Tsai Kai-jen (3)	1.03	
6 Jun	Mizuno Open	Tainan	3,000,000	(Taiwan) Ho Yu-cheng (2)	1.02	
4 Jul	Din Yue Open	Taichung	5,000,000	(Taiwan) Chan Shih-chang	1.44	
10 Jul	Ever Glory ADT Open	Kaohsiung	US$100,000	(United States) Nathan Han (n/a)	2.43	ADT
17 Jul	Ambassador ADT Open	Hsinchu	US$120,000	(Taiwan) Hung Chien-yao	3.56	ADT
24 Jul	HCT ADT Open	Hsinchu	US$120,000	(Taiwan) Lu Wei-chih	3.74	ADT
8 Aug	Qing Lian HDF Open	Kaohsiung	3,500,000	(Taiwan) Wang Wei-hsuan	1.49	
15 Aug	Wealthy Family Open	Miaoli	3,500,000	(Taiwan) Wang Wei-hsuan	1.60	
4 Sep	Chasing Dreams Open	Hsinchu	3,000,000	(Taiwan) Shapiyate Mako (2)	1.14	
20 Sep	Yeangder Tournament Players Championship	New Taipei	US$1,200,000	(Thailand) Pavit Tangkamolprasert (n/a)	7.84	ASA
27 Sep	Mercuries Taiwan Masters	New Taipei	US$1,200,000	(Taiwan) Hung Chien-yao	6.89	ASA
7 Nov	Da Jia Charity Open	Taichung	3,000,000	(Taiwan) Liu Yung-hua (4)	1.22	

=== Order of Merit ===
The Order of Merit was based on prize money won during the season, calculated in New Taiwan dollars.

Position	Player	Prize money (NT$)
1	(Taiwan) Hung Chien-yao	11,944,754
2	(Taiwan) Wang Wei-hsuan	4,447,287
3	(Taiwan) Chang Wei-lun	3,204,165
4	(Thailand) Suteepat Prateeptienchai	2,709,165
5	(Taiwan) Chan Shih-chang	2,080,703

== 2025 season ==
=== Schedule ===
The following table lists official events during the 2025 season.

Date	Tournament	Location	Purse (NT$)	Winner	OWGR points	Other tours (Note: ADT − Asian Development Tour; ASA − Asian Tour; TWNLPGA − Taiwan LPGA Tour.)
29 Mar	Chang Wah Open	Kaohsiung	3,000,000	(Taiwan) Su Ching-hung	2.07	
11 May	Sun Flower TPGA Championship	New Taipei	7,500,000	(Taiwan) Shen Wei-cheng	1.50	
31 May	Ambassador ADT	Hsinchu	US$100,000	(Italy) Gabriele De Barba (1)	3.08	ADT
8 Jun	Mizuno Open	Tainan	3,000,000	(Taiwan) Chang Wei-lun (5)	1.56	
28 Jun	Nan Pao Open	Tainan	3,000,000	(Taiwan) Wang Wei-hsuan	1.09	
5 Jul	Da Jia Charity Open	Taichung	3,000,000	(Taiwan) Huang Yi-tseng	1.16	
19 Jul	Din Yue Open	Taichung	3,000,000	(Taiwan) Wang Wei-hsuan	1.63	
26 Jul	Trust Golf Asian Mixed 1	Thailand	฿5,000,000	(Thailand) Thanyakon Khrongpha (n/a)	1.79	TWNLPGA (Note: Mixed event)
1 Aug	Chasing Dreams Open	Hsinchu	3,000,000	(Taiwan) Chang Wei-lun (6)	1.43	
9 Aug	Qing Lian HDF Open	Taichung	3,500,000	(Taiwan) Wang Wei-hsuan	1.28	
16 Aug	Trust Golf Asian Mixed 2	Thailand	฿5,000,000	(Thailand) Tawit Polthai (2)	1.50	TWNLPGA
22 Aug	Trust Golf Asian Mixed 3	Thailand	฿5,000,000	(Thailand) Patcharajutar Kongkraphan (n/a)	1.67 (Note: OWGR points at the Trust Golf Asian Mixed 3 were awarded based on men's scores only. Poom Saksansin had the lowest men's score and was awarded with the 1.67 points.)	TWNLPGA
13 Sep	Giant Open	New Taipei	3,000,000	(Taiwan) Shapiyate Mako (1)	0.85	
21 Sep	Yeangder Tournament Players Championship	New Taipei	US$1,000,000	(Japan) Kazuki Higa (n/a)	8.09	ASA
28 Sep	Mercuries Taiwan Masters	New Taipei	US$1,000,000	(Thailand) Rattanon Wannasrichan (n/a)	6.92	ASA
3 Oct	Wealthy Family Open	Kaohsiung	3,000,000	(Taiwan) Tsai Kai-jen (2)	0.74	
24 Oct	SL Link Elite Invitational	Miaoli	3,000,000	(Taiwan) Wu Yao-wei	0.72	
16 Nov	Taiwan Glass Taifong Open	Taichung	US$400,000	(Thailand) Ekpharit Wu (n/a)	4.42	ASA
19 Dec	Tian Zheng Chang Wah TPGA Pro-Am	Kaohsiung	3,000,000	(Taiwan) Lin Chuan-tai (1)	1.01	

=== Order of Merit ===
The Order of Merit was based on prize money won during the season, calculated in New Taiwan dollars.

Position	Player	Prize money (NT$)
1	(Taiwan) Wang Wei-hsuan	6,708,705
2	(Taiwan) Hung Chien-yao	2,974,986
3	(Taiwan) Shen Wei-cheng	2,739,926
4	(Thailand) Suteepat Prateeptienchai	2,389,542
5	(Thailand) Tawit Polthai	2,072,225

== 2024 season ==
=== Schedule ===
The following table lists official events during the 2024 season.

Date	Tournament	Location	Purse (NT$)	Winner	OWGR points	Other tours
30 Mar	Chang Wah Open	Kaohsiung	3,000,000	(Taiwan) Chang Wei-lun (2)	n/a	
19 May	Changhua Open	Changhua	3,500,000	(Taiwan) Liu Yung-hua (2)	n/a	
2 Jun	Sun Flower TPGA Championship	New Taipei	7,000,000	(Taiwan) Lee Chieh-po (7)	n/a	
22 Jun	Nan Pao Open	Tainan	3,000,000	(Taiwan) Liu Yung-hua (3)	n/a	
29 Jun	Mizuno Open	Tainan	3,000,000	(Taiwan) Chang Wei-lun (3)	n/a	
20 Jul	Wealthy Family Open	Taichung	3,500,000	(Taiwan) Chang Wei-lun (4)	n/a	
2 Aug	Chasing Dreams Open	Hsinchu	3,000,000	(Taiwan) Wang Wei-hsuan	n/a	
9 Aug	Qing Lian HDF Open	Taichung	3,500,000	(Taiwan) Wang Wei-hsuan	n/a	
6 Sep	SL Link Elite Invitational	Miaoli	3,000,000	(Taiwan) Liu Yung-hua (4)	n/a	
29 Sep	Yeangder TPC	New Taipei	US$1,000,000	(Thailand) Suteepat Prateeptienchai (2)	6.13	ASA
6 Oct	Mercuries Taiwan Masters	New Taipei	US$1,000,000	(South Africa) Jbe' Kruger (n/a)	4.22	ASA
26 Oct	Kaohsiung Open	Kaohsiung	3,150,000	(Taiwan) Lu Wei-chih	n/a	
9 Nov	Ambassador ADT Open	Hsinchu	US$100,000	(Thailand) Witchayapat Sinsrang (n/a)	1.77	ADT
17 Nov	Taiwan Glass Taifong Open	Taichung	US$400,000	(Thailand) Suteepat Prateeptienchai (3)	3.38	ASA
6 Dec	Giant Open	Hsinchu	3,000,000	(Taiwan) Chi Huang	n/a	
27 Dec	Peng Yi Open	Kaohsiung	3,000,000	(Thailand) Tawit Polthai (1)	n/a	

=== Order of Merit ===
The Order of Merit was based on prize money won during the season, calculated in New Taiwan dollars.

Position	Player	Prize money (NT$)
1	(Thailand) Suteepat Prateeptienchai	8,888,480
2	(Taiwan) Lee Chieh-po	3,827,440
3	(Taiwan) Liu Yung-hua	3,766,786
4	(Taiwan) Wang Wei-hsuan	2,900,456
5	(Taiwan) Hung Chien-yao	2,385,516

== 2023 season ==
=== Schedule ===
The following table lists official events during the 2023 season.

Date	Tournament	Location	Purse (NT$)	Winner	OWGR points	Other tours (Note: ASA − Asian Tour.)
1 Apr	Chang Wah Open	Kaohsiung	3,000,000	(Taiwan) Hsieh Chi-hsien	n/a	
7 Apr	Changhua Open	Changhua	3,000,000	(Taiwan) Wang Wei-hsuan	n/a	
28 May	Sun Flower TPGA Championship	New Taipei	6,000,000	(Taiwan) Chan Shih-chang	n/a	
1 Jul	Mizuno Open	Tainan	3,000,000	(Taiwan) Hung Chien-yao	n/a	
14 Jul	Chasing Dreams Open	Hsinchu	3,000,000	(Taiwan) Chan Shih-chang	n/a	
4 Aug	Yeangder Open	New Taipei	3,000,000	(Taiwan) Chen Hsuan-yi (a) (1)	n/a	
25 Aug	Nan Pao Open	Tainan	3,000,000	(Taiwan) Tsai Kai-jen (1)	n/a	
1 Sep	Hwan Tai Open	Taichung	3,000,000	(Taiwan) Liao Huan-jyun	n/a	
24 Sep	Yeangder TPC	New Taipei	US$750,000	(Thailand) Poom Saksansin (n/a)	4.38	ASA
1 Oct	Mercuries Taiwan Masters	New Taipei	US$1,000,000	(South Africa) Jaco Ahlers (n/a)	4.32	ASA
28 Oct	Kaohsiung Open	Kaohsiung	3,000,000	(Taiwan) Lu Wei-chih	n/a	
3 Nov	Dingbang Elite Invitational	Taichung	6,000,000	(Thailand) Warun Ieamgaew (1)	n/a	
24 Nov	Lee Yih Open	Taichung	3,000,000	(Taiwan) Hung Chien-yao	n/a	
3 Dec	Taiwan Glass Taifong Open	Taichung	US$400,000	(Thailand) Suteepat Prateeptienchai (1)	3.15	ASA

=== Order of Merit ===
The Order of Merit was based on prize money won during the season, calculated in New Taiwan dollars.

Position	Player	Prize money (NT$)
1	(Taiwan) Chan Shih-chang	3,672,800
2	(Taiwan) Hung Chien-yao	2,909,733
3	(Taiwan) Liu Yung-hua	2,656,613
4	(Taiwan) Chang Wei-lun	2,190,266
5	(Taiwan) Lu Wei-chih	1,824,146

== 2022 season ==
=== Schedule ===
The following table lists official events during the 2022 season.

Date	Tournament	Location	Purse (NT$)	Winner	OWGR points	Other tours
26 Mar	Chang Wah Open	Kaohsiung	3,000,000	(Taiwan) Chan Shih-chang	n/a	
8 May	Sun Flower TPGA Championship	New Taipei	7,000,000	(Taiwan) Hung Chien-yao	n/a	
2 Jul	Mizuno Open	Tainan	3,000,000	(Taiwan) Liu Yen-hung	n/a	
7 Aug	Yeangder Open	New Taipei	3,000,000	(Taiwan) Hung Chien-yao	n/a	
19 Aug	Chasing Dreams Open	Hsinchu	3,150,000	(Taiwan) Ho Yu-cheng (1)	n/a	
16 Sep	Dingbang Elite Invitational	Taichung	3,000,000	(Taiwan) Chan Shih-chang	n/a	
25 Sep	Yeangder TPC	New Taipei	US$700,000	(Australia) Travis Smyth (n/a)	2.29	ASA
2 Oct	Mercuries Taiwan Masters	New Taipei	US$1,000,000	(Taiwan) Chan Shih-chang	2.29	ASA
14 Oct	Yeangder Elite Open	New Taipei	3,000,000	(Taiwan) Wang Wei-hsuan	n/a	
21 Oct	Taiwan Open	Taichung	3,000,000	(Taiwan) Chan Shih-chang	n/a	
29 Oct	Kaohsiung Open	Kaohsiung	3,000,000	(Taiwan) Kao Teng	n/a	
11 Nov	Taichung Charity Elite Open	Taichung	7,000,000	(Taiwan) Lee Chieh-po (6)	n/a	
18 Nov	Lee Yih Open	Taichung	3,000,000	(Taiwan) Hung Chien-yao	n/a	
25 Dec	Taifong Open	Taichung	US$200,000	(Taiwan) Hung Chien-yao	1.36	ADT

=== Order of Merit ===
The Order of Merit was based on prize money won during the season, calculated in New Taiwan dollars.

Position	Player	Prize money (NT$)
1	(Taiwan) Chan Shih-chang	8,690,506
2	(Taiwan) Lee Chieh-po	4,670,639
3	(Taiwan) Hung Chien-yao	4,501,150
4	(Taiwan) Liu Yen-hung	2,175,332
5	(Taiwan) Wang Wei-hsuan	1,983,347

== 2021 season ==
=== Schedule ===
The following table lists official events during the 2021 season.

Date	Tournament	Location	Purse (NT$)	Winner
13 Mar	TPGA Open	Kaohsiung	3,000,000	(Taiwan) Hung Chien-yao
9 May	Yeangder Open	New Taipei	3,000,000	(Taiwan) Lee Chieh-po (1)
16 May	Sun Flower TPGA Championship	New Taipei	7,000,000	(Taiwan) Hung Chien-yao
3 Sep	Nan Pao Open	Tainan	3,000,000	(Taiwan) Lee Chieh-po (2)
19 Sep	Daan Open	Taichung	3,000,000	(Taiwan) Chan Shih-chang
3 Oct	Mercuries Taiwan Masters	New Taipei	US$1,000,000	(Taiwan) Wang Wei-hsiang
30 Oct	Kaohsiung Open	Kaohsiung	3,000,000	(Taiwan) Lee Chieh-po (3)
12 Nov	Yeangder Elite Open	New Taipei	3,000,000	(Taiwan) Fang Yin-jen
20 Nov	Yeangder TPC	New Taipei	6,000,000	(Taiwan) Lee Chieh-po (4)
3 Dec	Mizuno Open	Tainan	6,000,000	(Taiwan) Lin Wen-tang
2 Jan	Taifong Open	Taichung	4,800,000	(Taiwan) Lee Chieh-po (5)
7 Jan	Taiwan Open	Taichung	3,000,000	(Taiwan) Hung Chien-yao
21 Jan	Dingbang Elite Invitational	Taichung	3,000,000	(Taiwan) Chi Huang

=== Order of Merit ===
The Order of Merit was based on prize money won during the season, calculated in New Taiwan dollars.

Position	Player	Prize money (NT$)
1	(Taiwan) Lee Chieh-po	4,591,250
2	(Taiwan) Hung Chien-yao	4,547,666
3	(Taiwan) Wang Wei-hsiang	4,079,328
4	(Taiwan) Chi Huang	3,330,833
5	(Taiwan) Chan Shih-chang	3,213,250

== 2020 season ==
=== Schedule ===
The following table lists official events during the 2020 season.

Date	Tournament	Location	Purse (NT$)	Winner	Other tours
19 Jul; ~~17 May~~	Sun Flower TPGA Championship	New Taipei	6,000,000	(Taiwan) Yeh Yu-chen (2)	
20 Sep	Mercuries Taiwan Masters	New Taipei	US$950,000	(Taiwan) Wang Wei-hsuan	~~ASA~~
3 Oct	Kaohsiung Open	Kaohsiung	3,000,000	(Taiwan) Lin Yung-lung	
~~11 Oct~~	Yeangder TPC	New Taipei	–	Cancelled	
~~31 Oct~~	Taichung Charity Open	Taichung	–	Cancelled	
13 Dec	Taifong Open	Taichung	4,800,000	(Taiwan) Hung Chien-yao	

=== Order of Merit ===
The Order of Merit was based on prize money won during the season, calculated in New Taiwan dollars.

Position	Player	Prize money (NT$)
1	(Taiwan) Wang Wei-hsuan	2,582,180
2	(Taiwan) Chan Shih-chang	1,832,000
3	(Taiwan) Yeh Yu-chen	1,804,500
4	(Taiwan) Lee Chieh-po	1,498,200
5	(Taiwan) Hung Chien-yao	1,379,500

== 2019 season ==
=== Schedule ===
The following table lists official events during the 2019 season.

Date	Tournament	Location	Purse (NT$)	Winner	OWGR points	Other tours (Note: ASA − Asian Tour; ADT − Asian Development Tour; JPNSEN − Japan PGA Senior Tour; PGTA − PGT Asia.)
12 Apr	Taichung Charity Open	Taichung	3,500,000	(Taiwan) Lin Kuan-po (1)	n/a	
28 Apr	Fubon Yeangder Senior Cup	New Taipei	10,800,000	(Japan) Eiji Mizoguchi (n/a)	n/a	JPNSEN
26 May	Daan Open	Taichung	3,000,000	(Thailand) Wisut Artjanawat (n/a)	n/a	PGTA
7 Jul	Sun Flower TPGA Championship	New Taipei	6,000,000	(Taiwan) Hung Chien-yao	n/a	
8 Sep	Yeangder Tournament Players Championship	New Taipei	US$500,000	(South Korea) Chang Yi-keun (n/a)	14	ASA
29 Sep	Nan Pao Open	Tainan	3,000,000	(Philippines) Antonio Lascuña (n/a)	n/a	PGTA
6 Oct	Mercuries Taiwan Masters	New Taipei	US$900,000	(Thailand) Suradit Yongcharoenchai (n/a)	14	ASA
19 Oct	CAT Open	Philippines	US$100,000	(Australia) Tim Stewart (n/a)	n/a	PGTA
2 Nov	Kaohsiung Open	Kaohsiung	6,000,000	(Taiwan) Liu Yung-hua (a) (1)	n/a	
28 Dec	Taifong Open	Taichung	US$160,000	(Thailand) Donlaphatchai Niyomchon (n/a)	7	ADT

=== Order of Merit ===
The Order of Merit was based on prize money won during the season, calculated in New Taiwan dollars.

Position	Player	Prize money (NT$)
1	(Taiwan) Lin Wen-tang	2,189,161
2	(Taiwan) Hung Chien-yao	1,735,950
3	(Taiwan) Chan Shih-chang	1,376,887
4	(Taiwan) Chang Wei-lun	1,269,086
5	(Taiwan) Lin Kuan-po	891,533

== 2018 season ==
=== Schedule ===
The following table lists official events during the 2018 season.

Date	Tournament	Location	Purse (NT$)	Winner	OWGR points	Other tours (Note: ASA − Asian Tour; ADT − Asian Development Tour; JPNSEN − Japan PGA Senior Tour.)
20 May	Fubon Yeangder Senior Cup	New Taipei	10,800,000	(Thailand) Prayad Marksaeng (n/a)	n/a	JPNSEN
29 Jun	Tamsui Centennial Open	New Taipei	3,000,000	(Taiwan) Lu Wen-teh	n/a	
19 Aug	Taifong Open	Taichung	US$160,000	(Taiwan) Chan Shih-chang	6	ADT
22 Sep	Chen Chi-chuan Memorial Open	Kaohsiung	6,000,000	(Taiwan) Yeh Yu-chen	n/a	
30 Sep	Mercuries Taiwan Masters	New Taipei	US$850,000	(Brazil) Adilson da Silva (n/a)	14	ASA
7 Oct	Yeangder Tournament Players Championship	New Taipei	US$500,000	(United States) John Catlin (n/a)	14	ASA
14 Oct	Sun Flower TPGA Championship	New Taipei	6,000,000	(Taiwan) Hung Chien-yao	n/a	

=== Order of Merit ===
The Order of Merit was based on prize money won during the season, calculated in New Taiwan dollars.

Position	Player	Prize money (NT$)
1	(Taiwan) Lin Wen-tang	3,234,375
2	(Taiwan) Hung Chien-yao	2,466,329
3	(Taiwan) Yeh Yu-chen	1,846,891
4	(Taiwan) Chan Shih-chang	1,402,320
5	(Taiwan) Lu Wei-chih	1,332,188

== 2017 season ==
=== Schedule ===
The following table lists official events during the 2017 season.

Date	Tournament	Location	Purse (NT$)	Winner	OWGR points	Other tours
30 Apr	Yeangder Heritage	New Taipei	US$300,000	(India) Shiv Kapur (n/a)	14	ASA
25 Jun	Taifong Open	Taichung	US$160,000	(Thailand) Pannakorn Uthaipas (n/a)	6	ADT
9 Jul	Charming Yeangder ADT	New Taipei	US$150,000	(Taiwan) Chang Wei-lun (1)	6	ADT
23 Jul	Sun Flower TPGA Championship	New Taipei	5,000,000	(Taiwan) Hung Chien-yao	n/a	
4 Aug	Wai Hung Yeangder Cup	New Taipei	3,000,000	(Taiwan) Chan Shih-chang	n/a	
10 Sep	Golden Eagle Open	New Taipei	3,000,000	(United States) John Catlin (n/a)	n/a	
1 Oct	Mercuries Taiwan Masters	New Taipei	US$800,000	(Malaysia) Gavin Green (n/a)	14	ASA
8 Oct	Yeangder Tournament Players Championship	New Taipei	US$500,000	(India) Ajeetesh Sandhu (n/a)	14	ASA
22 Dec	Taiwan Strong Foundation Elite Invitational	Taichung	3,000,000	(Taiwan) Lin Wen-tang	n/a	

=== Order of Merit ===
The Order of Merit was based on prize money won during the season, calculated in New Taiwan dollars.

Position	Player	Prize money (NT$)
1	(Taiwan) Hung Chien-yao	1,856,000
2	(Taiwan) Chang Wei-lun	1,854,987
3	(Taiwan) Lin Wen-tang	1,676,181
4	(Taiwan) Lu Wei-chih	1,376,700
5	(Taiwan) Chan Shih-chang	1,217,281

== 2016 season ==
=== Schedule ===
The following table lists official events during the 2016 season.

Date	Tournament	Location	Purse (NT$)	Winner	OWGR points	Other tours
3 Apr	Charming Yeangder ADT	New Taipei	US$150,000	(Thailand) Pavit Tangkamolprasert (n/a)	6	ADT
16 Apr	Daan Construction Open	Taichung	3,000,000	(Taiwan) Hsieh Tung-hung	n/a	
22 May	Ambassador ADT	New Taipei	US$120,000	(Taiwan) Lin Wen-ko	6	ADT
3 Jul	Yeangder Tournament Players Championship	New Taipei	US$500,000	(Spain) Carlos Pigem (n/a)	14	ASA
10 Jul	Taifong Open	Taichung	US$120,000	(United States) Johannes Veerman (n/a)	6	ADT
28 Aug	Sun Flower TPGA Championship	New Taipei	5,000,000	(Taiwan) Chan Shih-chang	n/a	
23 Sep	Kaohsiung Open	Kaohsiung	10,000,000	(Taiwan) Lu Wen-teh	n/a	
2 Oct	Mercuries Taiwan Masters	New Taipei	US$800,000	(Taiwan) Lu Wei-chih	14	ASA
30 Oct	Golden Eagle Open	New Taipei	5,000,000	(Taiwan) Lu Wen-teh	n/a	
31 Dec	Taiwan Strong Foundation Elite Invitational	Taichung	3,000,000	(Taiwan) Chan Shih-chang	n/a	

=== Order of Merit ===
The Order of Merit was based on prize money won during the season, calculated in New Taiwan dollars.

Position	Player	Prize money (NT$)
1	(Taiwan) Lu Wei-chih	6,308,639
2	(Taiwan) Lu Wen-teh	4,376,055
3	(Philippines) Miguel Tabuena	3,284,938
4	(Spain) Carlos Pigem	2,925,000
5	(Taiwan) Lin Wen-tang	2,638,057

== 2015 season ==
=== Schedule ===
The following table lists official events during the 2015 season.

Date	Tournament	Location	Purse (NT$)	Winner	OWGR points	Other tours
29 Mar	Charming Yeangder ADT	New Taipei	US$150,000	(Taiwan) Hsieh Chi-hsien	6	ADT
23 May	Ambassador ADT	Taoyuan	US$120,000	(Taiwan) Chan Shih-chang	6	ADT
19 Jul	TPGA Championship	New Taipei	5,000,000	(Thailand) Piya Swangarunporn (n/a)	n/a	
2 Aug	Taifong Open	Taichung	US$160,000	(Thailand) Rattanon Wannasrichan (n/a)	6	ADT
14 Aug	Luncheon TPC Classic	New Taipei	6,000,000	(Taiwan) Lu Wen-teh	n/a	
19 Sep	Kaohsiung Open	Kaohsiung	3,500,000	(Taiwan) Wang Ter-chang	n/a	
27 Sep	Ballantine's Taiwan Championship	Miaoli	US$110,000	(Thailand) Thammanoon Sriroj (n/a)	6	ADT
4 Oct	Mercuries Taiwan Masters	New Taipei	US$650,000	(Malaysia) Danny Chia (n/a)	14	ASA
11 Oct	Yeangder Tournament Players Championship	New Taipei	US$500,000	(South Africa) Shaun Norris (n/a)	14	ASA
18 Oct	Golden Eagle Open	Taoyuan	5,000,000	(Taiwan) Yeh Wei-tze	n/a	
18 Dec	Y2K Taichung Elite Invitational	Taichung	2,000,000	(Taiwan) Hsieh Chi-hsien	n/a	

=== Order of Merit ===
The Order of Merit was based on prize money won during the season, calculated in New Taiwan dollars.

Position	Player	Prize money (NT$)
1	(Taiwan) Lin Wen-tang	1,964,081
2	(Taiwan) Yeh Wei-tze	1,535,226
3	(Taiwan) Hsieh Chi-hsien	1,463,799
4	(Taiwan) Lu Wen-teh	1,375,644
5	(Taiwan) Chan Shih-chang	1,369,986
