= 2019 Asian Tour =

Golf tour season

2019 Asian Tour season
- Duration: 17 January 2019 – 22 December 2019
- Number of official events: 23 (Note: One further tournament was scheduled but was postponed.)
- Most wins: (Thailand) Jazz Janewattananond (4)
- Order of Merit: (Thailand) Jazz Janewattananond
- Players' Player of the Year: (Thailand) Jazz Janewattananond
- Rookie of the Year: (Thailand) Sadom Kaewkanjana

The 2019 Asian Tour was the 25th season of the modern Asian Tour (formerly the Asian PGA Tour), the main professional golf tour in Asia (outside of Japan) since it was established in 1995.

== Schedule ==
The following table lists official events during the 2019 season.

| Date | Tournament | Host country | Purse (US$) | Winner (Note: The number in brackets after each winner's name is the number of Asian Tour events they had won up to and including that tournament. This information is only shown for Asian Tour members.) | OWGR points | Other tours (Note: AFR − Sunshine Tour; ANZ − PGA Tour of Australasia; EUR − European Tour; JPN − Japan Golf Tour; KOR − Korean Tour; PGTI − Professional Golf Tour of India; TWN − Taiwan PGA Tour.) | Notes |
|---|---|---|---|---|---|---|---|
| 20 Jan | SMBC Singapore Open | Singapore | 1,000,000 | (Thailand) Jazz Janewattananond (3) | 24 | JPN | |
| 17 Feb | ISPS Handa World Super 6 Perth | Australia | A$1,600,000 | (New Zealand) Ryan Fox (n/a) | 20 | ANZ, EUR | |
| 3 Mar | New Zealand Open | New Zealand | NZ$1,250,000 | (Australia) Zach Murray (1) | 15 | ANZ | |
| 24 Mar | Maybank Championship | Malaysia | 3,000,000 | (Australia) Scott Hend (10) | 24 | EUR | |
| 31 Mar | Hero Indian Open | India | 1,750,000 | (Scotland) Stephen Gallacher (n/a) | 19 | EUR | |
| 6 Apr | Bangabandhu Cup Golf Open | Bangladesh | 350,000 | (Thailand) Sadom Kaewkanjana (1) | 14 | | |
| 5 May | Volvo China Open | China | CN¥20,000,000 | (Finland) Mikko Korhonen (n/a) | 24 | EUR | |
| 5 May | GS Caltex Maekyung Open | South Korea | ₩1,200,000,000 | (South Korea) Lee Tae-hee (1) | 12 | KOR | |
| 12 May | Asia-Pacific Diamond Cup Golf | Japan | ¥150,000,000 | (Japan) Yosuke Asaji (1) | 15 | JPN | |
| 23 Jun | Kolon Korea Open | South Korea | ₩1,200,000,000 | (Thailand) Jazz Janewattananond (4) | 13 | KOR | |
| 18 Aug | Sarawak Championship | Malaysia | 300,000 | (Australia) Andrew Dodt (3) | 14 | | |
| 1 Sep | Bank BRI Indonesia Open | Indonesia | 500,000 | (Argentina) Miguel Ángel Carballo (1) | 14 | | |
| 8 Sep | Yeangder Tournament Players Championship | Taiwan | 500,000 | (South Korea) Chang Yi-keun (1) | 14 | TWN | |
| 15 Sep | Classic Golf and Country Club International Championship | India | 300,000 | (Indonesia) Rory Hie (1) | 10 | PGTI | New tournament |
| 22 Sep | Shinhan Donghae Open | South Korea | ₩1,200,000,000 | (South Africa) Jbe' Kruger (2) | 14 | JPN, KOR | |
| 29 Sep | Panasonic Open Golf Championship | Japan | ¥150,000,000 | (Japan) Toshinori Muto (n/a) | 15 | JPN | |
| 6 Oct | Mercuries Taiwan Masters | Taiwan | 900,000 | (Thailand) Suradit Yongcharoenchai (1) | 14 | TWN | |
| 10 Nov | Thailand Open | Thailand | 300,000 | (United States) John Catlin (4) | 14 | | |
| 17 Nov | Panasonic Open India | India | 400,000 | (South Korea) Tom Kim (1) | 10 | PGTI | |
| 24 Nov | Sabah Masters | Malaysia | 300,000 | (Thailand) Pavit Tangkamolprasert (2) | 14 | | New tournament |
| ~~1 Dec~~ | Hong Kong Open | Hong Kong | – | Postponed (Note: Postponed and rescheduled to January 2020 due to protest violence.) | – | ~~EUR~~ | |
| 8 Dec | AfrAsia Bank Mauritius Open | Mauritius | €1,000,000 | (Denmark) Rasmus Højgaard (n/a) | 17 | AFR, EUR | |
| 15 Dec | BNI Indonesian Masters | Indonesia | 750,000 | (Thailand) Jazz Janewattananond (5) | 20 | | Flagship event |
| 22 Dec | Thailand Masters | Thailand | 500,000 | (Thailand) Jazz Janewattananond (6) | 14 | | |

== Order of Merit ==
The Order of Merit was titled as the Habitat for Humanity Standings and was based on prize money won during the season, calculated in U.S. dollars. The leading player on the Order of Merit (not otherwise exempt) earned status to play on the 2020 European Tour.

| Position | Player | Prize money ($) | Status earned |
|---|---|---|---|
| 1 | (Thailand) Jazz Janewattananond | 1,058,525 | Already exempt (Note: Janewattananond and Kawamura were already exempt due to finishing inside the Top 115 of the 2019 Race to Dubai.) |
| 2 | (Australia) Scott Hend | 545,419 | Already exempt (Note: Hend was already exempt due to being a tournament winner on the 2019 European Tour.) |
| 3 | (South Korea) Lee Tae-hee | 298,125 | Promoted to European Tour |
| 4 | (Thailand) Suradit Yongcharoenchai | 277,461 | |
| 5 | (Japan) Masahiro Kawamura | 260,101 | Already exempt |

== Awards ==
| Award | Winner | Ref. |
|---|---|---|
| Players' Player of the Year | (Thailand) Jazz Janewattananond | |
| Rookie of the Year | (Thailand) Sadom Kaewkanjana | |

== See also ==
- 2019 Asian Development Tour
