= 2018 Asian Tour =

Golf tour season

2018 Asian Tour season
- Duration: 18 January 2018 – 16 December 2018
- Number of official events: 31 (Note: One further tournament was scheduled but was removed from the schedule.)
- Most wins: (United States) John Catlin (3)
- Order of Merit: (India) Shubhankar Sharma
- Players' Player of the Year: (United States) John Catlin
- Rookie of the Year: (South Korea) Park Sang-hyun

The 2018 Asian Tour was the 24th season of the modern Asian Tour (formerly the Asian PGA Tour), the main professional golf tour in Asia (outside of Japan) since it was established in 1995.

== Changes for 2018 ==
In February, Habitat for Humanity announced that they had partnered with the Asian Tour to see the Order of Merit rebranded as the Habitat for Humanity Standings.

== Schedule ==
The following table lists official events during the 2018 season.

| Date | Tournament | Host country | Purse (US$) | Winner (Note: The number in brackets after each winner's name is the number of Asian Tour events they had won up to and including that tournament. This information is only shown for Asian Tour members.) | OWGR points | Other tours (Note: AFR − Sunshine Tour; ANZ − PGA Tour of Australasia; CHN − China Tour; EUR − European Tour; JPN − Japan Golf Tour; KOR − Korean Tour; PGAT − PGA Tour; PGTI − Professional Golf Tour of India; TWN − Taiwan PGA Tour.) | Notes |
|---|---|---|---|---|---|---|---|
| 21 Jan | SMBC Singapore Open | Singapore | 1,000,000 | (Spain) Sergio García (5) | 28 | JPN | |
| 28 Jan | Leopalace21 Myanmar Open | Myanmar | 750,000 | (United States) Paul Peterson (1) | 19 | JPN | |
| 4 Feb | Maybank Championship | Malaysia | 3,000,000 | (India) Shubhankar Sharma (2) | 38 | EUR | |
| 11 Feb | ISPS Handa World Super 6 Perth | Australia | A$1,750,000 | (Thailand) Kiradech Aphibarnrat (3) | 23 | ANZ, EUR | |
| 4 Mar | ISPS Handa New Zealand Open | New Zealand | NZ$1,150,000 | (Australia) Daniel Nisbet (1) | 15 | ANZ | New to Asian Tour |
| 11 Mar | Hero Indian Open | India | 1,750,000 | (England) Matt Wallace (n/a) | 22 | EUR | |
| 22 Apr | Panasonic Open Golf Championship | Japan | ¥150,000,000 | (India) Rahil Gangjee (2) | 15 | JPN | |
| 29 Apr | Volvo China Open | China | CN¥20,000,000 | (Sweden) Alexander Björk (n/a) | 32 | EUR | |
| 6 May | GS Caltex Maekyung Open | South Korea | ₩1,000,000,000 | (South Korea) Park Sang-hyun (1) | 12 | KOR | |
| 12 May | AB Bank Bangladesh Open | Bangladesh | 300,000 | (Sweden) Malcolm Kokocinski (1) | 14 | | |
| 20 May | Asia-Pacific Classic | China | 300,000 | (United States) John Catlin (1) | 10 | CHN | New tournament |
| 10 Jun | Thailand Open | Thailand | 300,000 | (Thailand) Panuphol Pittayarat (2) | 14 | | |
| 24 Jun | Kolon Korea Open | South Korea | ₩1,200,000,000 | (South Korea) Choi Min-chel (1) | 12 | KOR | |
| 1 Jul | Queen's Cup | Thailand | 300,000 | (Thailand) Jazz Janewattananond (2) | 14 | | |
| 7 Jul | Sarawak Championship | Malaysia | 300,000 | (United States) John Catlin (2) | 14 | | New tournament |
| 15 Jul | Bank BRI Indonesia Open | Indonesia | 500,000 | (South Africa) Justin Harding (1) | 14 | | |
| 29 Jul | Royal Cup | Thailand | 500,000 | (South Africa) Justin Harding (2) | 14 | | New tournament |
| 5 Aug | Fiji International | Fiji | A$1,250,000 | (India) Gaganjeet Bhullar (9) | 15 | ANZ, EUR | |
| 12 Aug | TAKE Solutions Masters | India | 350,000 | (India) Viraj Madappa (1) | 14 | PGTI | |
| 16 Sep | Shinhan Donghae Open | South Korea | ₩1,200,000,000 | (South Korea) Park Sang-hyun (2) | 12 | KOR | |
| 23 Sep | Asia-Pacific Diamond Cup Golf | Japan | ¥150,000,000 | (Japan) Yuta Ikeda (n/a) | 15 | JPN | |
| 30 Sep | Mercuries Taiwan Masters | Taiwan | 850,000 | (Brazil) Adilson da Silva (1) | 14 | TWN | |
| 7 Oct | Yeangder Tournament Players Championship | Taiwan | 500,000 | (United States) John Catlin (3) | 14 | TWN | |
| 14 Oct | CIMB Classic | Malaysia | 7,000,000 | (Australia) Marc Leishman (n/a) | 48 | PGAT | Limited-field event |
| 14 Oct | UMA CNS Open | Pakistan | 300,000 | (Thailand) Tirawat Kaewsiribandit (1) | 14 | | |
| 28 Oct | Panasonic Open India | India | 400,000 | (India) Khalin Joshi (1) | 14 | PGTI | |
| 25 Nov | Honma Hong Kong Open | Hong Kong | 2,000,000 | (England) Aaron Rai (n/a) | 30 | EUR | |
| 2 Dec | Queen's Cup | Thailand | 500,000 | (Philippines) Miguel Tabuena (2) | 14 | | |
| 2 Dec | AfrAsia Bank Mauritius Open | Mauritius | €1,000,000 | (United States) Kurt Kitayama (1) | 17 | AFR, EUR | |
| ~~9 Dec~~ | Ho Tram Players Championship | Vietnam | – | Removed | – | | |
| 9 Dec | South African Open | South Africa | R17,500,000 | (South Africa) Louis Oosthuizen (3) | 32 | AFR, EUR | New to Asian Tour |
| 16 Dec | BNI Indonesian Masters | Indonesia | 750,000 | (Thailand) Poom Saksansin (3) | 24 | | Flagship event |

== Order of Merit ==
The Order of Merit was titled as the Habitat for Humanity Standings and was based on prize money won during the season, calculated in U.S. dollars. The leading player on the Order of Merit (not otherwise exempt) earned status to play on the 2019 European Tour.

| Position | Player | Prize money ($) | Status earned |
|---|---|---|---|
| 1 | (India) Shubhankar Sharma | 755,994 | Already exempt (Note: Sharma and Bhullar were already exempt due to being tournament winners on the 2018 European Tour.) |
| 2 | (South Korea) Park Sang-hyun | 566,212 | Promoted to European Tour |
| 3 | (South Africa) Justin Harding | 479,817 | |
| 4 | (India) Gaganjeet Bhullar | 422,936 | Already exempt |
| 5 | (Zimbabwe) Scott Vincent | 420,887 | |

== Awards ==
| Award | Winner | Ref. |
|---|---|---|
| Players' Player of the Year | (United States) John Catlin | |
| Rookie of the Year | (South Korea) Park Sang-hyun | |

== See also ==
- 2018 Asian Development Tour
