= Lu Wei-chih =

Taiwanese golfer (born 1979)

Personal information
- Nationality: Taiwan
- Born: 19 March 1979 (age 47) Tamsui, New Taipei City, Taiwan
- Height: 1.80 m (5 ft 11 in)
- Weight: 85 kg (187 lb; 13.4 st)

Career
- Sport: Golf
- Turned professional: 2003
- Current tours: Asian Development Tour; Taiwan PGA Tour
- Former tours: Japan Golf Tour; Asian Tour; Japan Challenge Tour
- Professional wins: 8

Number of wins by tour
- Asian Tour: 4
- Other: 3

Lu Wei-chih (Chinese: 呂偉智, born 19 March 1979) is a Taiwanese professional golfer.

== Career ==
Lu plays on the Asian Tour, where he has won three times and on the Japan Golf Tour. He has represented Taiwan twice in the World Cup.

== Professional wins (8) ==
=== Asian Tour wins (4) ===
No.	Date	Tournament	Winning score	Margin of victory	Runner-up
1	25 Sep 2005	Mercuries Taiwan Masters	−4 (71-69-70-74=284)	2 strokes	(Taiwan) Lin Wen-tang
2	9 Oct 2011	Yeangder Tournament Players Championship	−5 (70-73-71-69=283)	1 stroke	(Taiwan) Lu Wen-teh
3	6 Nov 2011	Mercuries Taiwan Masters (2)	−10 (66-66-72-74=278)	3 strokes	(Thailand) Thaworn Wiratchant
4	2 Oct 2016	Mercuries Taiwan Masters^{1} (3)	−5 (70-72-71-70=283)	1 stroke	(Philippines) Miguel Tabuena

^{1}Co-sanctioned by the Taiwan PGA Tour

=== Japan Challenge Tour wins (1) ===
No.	Date	Tournament	Winning score	Margin of victory	Runner-up
1	23 Oct 2009	PRGR Novil Cup Final	−24 (67-68-66-63=264)	6 strokes	(Japan) Yoshiyuki Uemoto

=== Asian Development Tour wins (1) ===
No.	Date	Tournament	Winning score	Margin of victory	Runners-up
1	24 Jul 2026	HCT ADT Open^{1}	−15 (69-69-63-72=273)	Playoff	(Taiwan) Shapiyate Mako, (Taiwan) Wang Wei-hsuan

^{1}Co-sanctioned by the Taiwan PGA Tour

=== Taiwan PGA Tour wins (3) ===
No.	Date	Tournament	Winning score	Margin of victory	Runner(s)-up
1	2 Oct 2016	Mercuries Taiwan Masters^{1}	−5 (70-72-71-70=283)	1 stroke	(Philippines) Miguel Tabuena
2	28 Oct 2023	Kaohsiung Open	−11 (69-70-69-69=277)	4 strokes	(Taiwan) He Chin-hung, (Taiwan) Liu Yung-hua
3	26 Oct 2024	Kaohsiung Open (2)	−11 (69-72-70-66=277)	Playoff	(Taiwan) Lin Yung-lung
4	24 Jul 2026	HCT ADT Open^{2}	−15 (69-69-63-72=273)	Playoff	(Taiwan) Shapiyate Mako, (Taiwan) Wang Wei-hsuan

^{1}Co-sanctioned by the Asian Tour
^{2}Co-sanctioned by the Asian Development Tour

== Team appearances ==
Amateur

- Eisenhower Trophy (representing Taiwan): 2000

Professional

- World Cup (representing Taiwan): 2004, 2009
