= 2023 Asian Tour =

Golf tour season

2023 Asian Tour season
- Duration: 2 February 2023 – 17 December 2023
- Number of official events: 23
- Most wins: (United States) Andy Ogletree (2)
- Order of Merit: (United States) Andy Ogletree
- International Series Order of Merit: (United States) Andy Ogletree
- Player of the Year: (United States) Andy Ogletree
- Rookie of the Year: (Hong Kong) Kho Taichi

The 2023 Asian Tour was the 28th season of the modern Asian Tour (formerly the Asian PGA Tour), the main professional golf tour in Asia (outside of Japan) since it was established in 1995.

== Changes for 2023 ==
New tournaments for the 2023 season included the International Series Oman, the International Series Qatar, the World City Championship in Hong Kong, the International Series Vietnam and the St Andrews Bay Championship played at Fairmont St Andrews in Scotland (the first Asian Tour event to be staged in Scotland).

The SJM Macao Open also returned to the schedule for the first time since 2017.

Two events from the 2020–22 Asian Development Tour schedule were upgraded to events on the 2023 Asian Tour schedule. They included the Taiwan Glass Taifong Open and the Saudi Open.

The season marked a switch of format in the Order of Merit, which saw it become a points-based system, rather than based on money earned.

== Schedule ==
The following table lists official events during the 2023 season.

Date	Tournament	Host country	Purse (US$)	Winner (Note: The number in brackets after each winner's name is the number of Asian Tour events they had won up to and including that tournament. This information is only shown for Asian Tour members.)	OWGR points	Other tours (Note: ANZ − PGA Tour of Australasia; CHN − China Tour; JPN − Japan Golf Tour; KOR − Korean Tour; TWN − Taiwan PGA Tour.)	Notes
5 Feb	PIF Saudi International	Saudi Arabia	5,000,000	(Mexico) Abraham Ancer (n/a)	24.42		
12 Feb	International Series Oman	Oman	2,000,000	(Japan) Takumi Kanaya (n/a)	12.76		International Series (Note: Also a new tournament.)
19 Feb	International Series Qatar	Qatar	2,500,000	(United States) Andy Ogletree (2)	7.21		International Series
5 Mar	New Zealand Open	New Zealand	NZ$1,650,000	(Australia) Brendan Jones (2)	5.85	ANZ	
12 Mar	International Series Thailand	Thailand	2,000,000	(Australia) Wade Ormsby (4)	7.33		International Series
19 Mar	DGC Open	India	750,000	(Philippines) Miguel Tabuena (3)	3.90		
26 Mar	World City Championship	Hong Kong	1,000,000	(Hong Kong) Kho Taichi (1)	6.83		New tournament
16 Apr	International Series Vietnam	Vietnam	2,000,000	(Zimbabwe) Kieran Vincent (1)	9.19		International Series
7 May	GS Caltex Maekyung Open	South Korea	₩1,300,000,000	(South Korea) Jung Chan-min (1)	6.29	KOR	
25 Jun	Kolon Korea Open	South Korea	₩1,350,000,000	(United States) Seungsu Han (1)	6.43	KOR	
6 Aug	Mandiri Indonesia Open	Indonesia	500,000	(Thailand) Nitithorn Thippong (3)	4.75		
20 Aug	International Series England	England	2,000,000	(United States) Andy Ogletree (3)	11.28		International Series
27 Aug	St Andrews Bay Championship	Scotland	1,500,000	(Spain) Eugenio Chacarra (n/a)	11.22		International Series
10 Sep	Shinhan Donghae Open	South Korea	₩1,400,000,000	(South Korea) Koh Gun-taek (1)	8.52	JPN, KOR	
24 Sep	Yeangder TPC	Taiwan	750,000	(Thailand) Poom Saksansin (4)	4.38	TWN	
1 Oct	Mercuries Taiwan Masters	Taiwan	1,000,000	(South Africa) Jaco Ahlers (1)	4.32	TWN	
8 Oct	International Series Singapore	Singapore	2,000,000	(Spain) David Puig (1)	8.55		International Series
15 Oct	SJM Macao Open	Macau	1,000,000	(Australia) Min Woo Lee (n/a)	5.25		
5 Nov	Volvo China Open	China	1,500,000	(Thailand) Sarit Suwannarut (2)	6.49	CHN	International Series
12 Nov	Hong Kong Open	Hong Kong	2,000,000	(New Zealand) Ben Campbell (1)	11.90		International Series
19 Nov	BNI Indonesian Masters	Indonesia	1,500,000	(India) Gaganjeet Bhullar (11)	9.57		International Series
3 Dec	Taiwan Glass Taifong Open	Taiwan	400,000	(Thailand) Suteepat Prateeptienchai (1)	3.15	TWN	New to Asian Tour
17 Dec	Saudi Open	Saudi Arabia	1,000,000	(Thailand) Denwit Boriboonsub (1)	5.97		New to Asian Tour

== Order of Merit ==
The Order of Merit was based on tournament results during the season, calculated using a points-based system.

Position	Player	Points
1	(United States) Andy Ogletree	2,129
2	(Philippines) Miguel Tabuena	1,437
3	(India) Gaganjeet Bhullar	1,432
4	(Australia) Travis Smyth	1,427
5	(New Zealand) Ben Campbell	1,395

== International Series Order of Merit ==
The International Series Order of Merit was based on prize money won during the International Series, calculated in U.S. dollars. The leading player on the International Series Order of Merit earned status to play in the 2024 LIV Golf League.

Position	Player	Prize money ($)
1	(United States) Andy Ogletree	1,101,828
2	(Spain) David Puig	577,800
3	(New Zealand) Ben Campbell	524,488
4	(Zimbabwe) Kieran Vincent	468,655
5	(Japan) Takumi Kanaya	426,233

== Awards ==
Award	Winner	Ref.
Player of the Year (Kyi Hla Han Award)	(United States) Andy Ogletree	
Rookie of the Year	(Hong Kong) Kho Taichi	

== See also ==
- 2023 Asian Development Tour
