= Macau Open =

SJM Macao Open
Tournament information
- Location: Macau
- Established: 1998
- Courses: Macau Golf and Country Club
- Par: 70
- Length: 6,713 yards (6,138 m)
- Tour: Asian Tour
- Format: Stroke play
- Prize fund: US$1,000,000
- Month played: October

Tournament record score
- Aggregate: 254 Min Woo Lee (2023)
- To par: −30 as above

Current champion
- (Taiwan) Wang Wei-hsuan

Location map
- Location in China Location in Macau

The Macau Open is a men's professional golf tournament on the Asian Tour which takes place in Macau. It was founded in 1998. The venue is the Macau Golf and Country Club at Coloane. Past winners including international stars and multiple European Tour Order of Merit champions Colin Montgomerie and Lee Westwood, as well as 6-time European Tour winner Simon Dyson. In 2016, the purse was US$1,100,000.

Having not been played since 2017, the event returned in 2023 to the Asian Tour's schedule.

== Winners ==
Year	Winner	Score	To par	Margin of victory	Runner(s)-up
SJM Macao Open
2026	(Taiwan) Wang Wei-hsuan	263	−17	Playoff	(South Korea) Im Sung-jae
2025	(Germany) Dominic Foos	263	−17	Playoff	(Taiwan) Wang Wei-hsuan
2024	(Thailand) Rattanon Wannasrichan	260	−20	2 strokes	(Thailand) Gunn Charoenkul
2023	(Australia) Min Woo Lee	254	−30	2 strokes	(Thailand) Poom Saksansin
Macao Open
2018–2022: No tournament
2017	(India) Gaganjeet Bhullar (2)	271	−13	3 strokes	(Philippines) Angelo Que (India) Ajeetesh Sandhu
Venetian Macao Open
2016	(Thailand) Pavit Tangkamolprasert	268	−16	Playoff	(India) Anirban Lahiri
Venetian Macau Open
2015	(Australia) Scott Hend (2)	264	−20	3 strokes	(India) Chiragh Kumar (India) Anirban Lahiri
2014	(India) Anirban Lahiri	267	−17	1 stroke	(Australia) Scott Hend (Thailand) Prom Meesawat
2013	(Australia) Scott Hend	268	−16	3 strokes	(India) Anirban Lahiri
2012	(India) Gaganjeet Bhullar	268	−16	2 strokes	(United States) Jonathan Moore
Macau Open
2011	(Taiwan) Chan Yih-shin	270	−14	3 strokes	(Australia) David Gleeson
2010: No tournament
2009	(Thailand) Thaworn Wiratchant	269	−15	6 strokes	(India) Gaganjeet Bhullar
2008	(Australia) David Gleeson	266	−18	3 strokes	(Taiwan) Lin Wen-tang
2007	(Taiwan) Lu Wen-teh	201 (Note: Shortened to 54 holes due to rain.)	−12	Playoff	(Australia) Richard Moir
2006	(Australia) Kane Webber	275	−9	3 strokes	(Australia) Scott Barr
2005	(Taiwan) Wang Ter-chang	270	−14	1 stroke	(Australia) Marcus Both (Australia) Jarrod Lyle
2004	(United States) Jason Knutzon	268	−16	1 stroke	(Thailand) Thaworn Wiratchant
2003	(Scotland) Colin Montgomerie	273	−11	Playoff	(Australia) Scott Barr
2002	(China) Zhang Lianwei (2)	277	−7	Playoff	(Zimbabwe) Nick Price
2001	(China) Zhang Lianwei	273	−11	1 stroke	(Scotland) Simon Yates
2000	(England) Simon Dyson	269	−15	2 strokes	(United States) Andrew Pitts (South Korea) Yang Yong-eun
1999	(England) Lee Westwood	275	−9	Playoff	(United States) Andrew Pitts
1998	(Japan) Satoshi Oide	283	−1	2 strokes	(Venezuela) Gilberto Morales (Fiji) Vijay Singh

== See also ==
- Open golf tournament
