= 2010 Asian Development Tour =

Golf tour season

2010 Asian Development Tour season
- Duration: 28 January 2010 – 6 November 2010
- Number of official events: 5
- Order of Merit: (Malaysia) S. Siva Chandhran

The 2010 Asian Development Tour was the inaugural season of the Asian Development Tour, the official development tour to the Asian Tour.

== Schedule ==
The following table lists official events during the 2010 season.

Date	Tournament	Host country	Purse (US$)	Winner (Note: The number in brackets after each winner's name is the number of Asian Development Tour events they had won up to and including that tournament. It is rare for someone to accumulate many wins on the Asian Development Tour as success at this level usually leads to promotion to the Asian Tour.)	Other tours (Note: TWN − Taiwan PGA Tour.)
31 Jan	Air Bagan Myanmar Masters	Myanmar	75,000	(Australia) Gavin Flint (1)	
18 Jul	Negeri Sembilan Masters Invitational	Malaysia	RM500,000	(Malaysia) S. Siva Chandhran (1)	
29 Aug	Ballantine's Taiwan Championship	Taiwan	90,000	(Taiwan) Lin Wen-tang (1)	TWN
24 Sep	Kariza Classic	Indonesia	60,000	(Thailand) Thanyakon Khrongpha (1)	
6 Nov	Bali Open	Indonesia	60,000	(Philippines) Juvic Pagunsan (1)	

== Order of Merit ==
The Order of Merit was based on prize money won during the season, calculated in U.S. dollars. The top three players on the Order of Merit earned status to play on the 2011 Asian Tour.

Position	Player	Prize money ($)
1	(Malaysia) S. Siva Chandhran	27,969
2	(Taiwan) Hsu Chia-jen	17,291
3	(Malaysia) Akhmal Tarmizee	15,209
4	(Australia) Gavin Flint	15,000
5	(South Korea) T. J. Kim	12,293
