= John Catlin (golfer) =

American professional golfer (born 1990)

Personal information
- Nationality: United States
- Born: November 15, 1990 (age 35) Sacramento, California, U.S.

Career
- Sport: Golf
- College: University of New Mexico
- Turned professional: 2013
- Current tours: European Tour; Asian Tour
- Former tours: Challenge Tour; PGA Tour Canada; Asian Development Tour; Gateway Tour
- Professional wins: 16
- Highest ranking: 76 (May 2, 2021) (as of November 8, 2026)

Number of wins by tour
- European Tour: 3
- Asian Tour: 7 (Tied-9th all-time)
- Challenge Tour: 1
- Other: 5

Best results in major championships
- Masters Tournament: DNP
- PGA Championship: CUT: 2021, 2025
- U.S. Open: DNP
- The Open Championship: T16: 2024

Achievements and awards
- Asian Tour Player of the Year: 2018, 2024
- Asian Tour Order of Merit winner: 2024

John Catlin (born November 15, 1990) is an American professional golfer who plays on the European Tour, Asian Tour and formerly played as a reserve on LIV Golf. He has won three times on the European Tour and has also seven wins on the Asian Tour.

== Amateur career ==
Catlin was born and grew up in Sacramento, California, United States. He picked up the game from an early age and found a lot of success as an amateur, winning consecutive NCGA State Match Play Championships in 2010 and 2011, and Memorial Amateur Championships in 2011 and 2012. Catlin then went on to play for the University of New Mexico where he was an Academic All-American and an honorable mention NCAA All-American in 2012. In the same year he also won the Arizona Intercollegiate and was named UNM Student-Athlete of the year.

== Professional career ==
Catlin turned professional in 2013, he started his first season as a professional playing on PGA Tour Canada. He then went on to play on the Asian Development Tour full-time, capturing two wins between 2016 and 2017.

Catlin's biggest success to date, came in the 2018 Asian Tour season where he won three times. This success awarded him the Asian Tour's player of the year honors. Furthermore, this success also gave him European Tour status for the 2019 season. Catlin won the 2019 Thailand Open in a three-man playoff to claim his fourth victory on the Asian Tour.

In August 2020, Catlin became the first player to be withdrawn from a tournament on the European Tour due to violating the tour's COVID-19 safety protocols, after he and his caddie went to a restaurant in the days leading up to the English Championship. A month later, Catlin won his first European Tour event at the Estrella Damm N.A. Andalucía Masters, completing a wire-to-wire victory when Martin Kaymer made a bogey on the final hole to fall into second place. Three weeks after his first European Tour win, Catlin won again at the Dubai Duty Free Irish Open, shooting a final-round 64 to beat Aaron Rai by two strokes.

In April 2021, Catlin claimed his third victory on the European Tour at the Austrian Golf Open. He defeated Maximilian Kieffer in a five-hole playoff.

In March 2024, Catlin shot a round of 59 at the International Series Macau; the first sub-60 round in Asian Tour history. He went on to win the tournament, beating David Puig in a sudden-death playoff.

In June 2024, Catlin made his debut in the LIV Golf League, substituting for injured Charles Howell III on Crushers GC at the LIV Golf Houston event.

== Professional wins (16) ==
=== European Tour wins (3) ===
No.	Date	Tournament	Winning score	Margin of victory	Runner-up
1	Sep 6, 2020	Estrella Damm N.A. Andalucía Masters	+2 (69-70-72-75=286)	1 stroke	(Germany) Martin Kaymer
2	Sep 27, 2020	Dubai Duty Free Irish Open	−10 (67-70-69-64=270)	2 strokes	(England) Aaron Rai
3	Apr 18, 2021	Austrian Golf Open	−14 (68-70-71-65=274)	Playoff	(Germany) Maximilian Kieffer

European Tour playoff record (1–0)

No.	Year	Tournament	Opponent	Result
1	2021	Austrian Golf Open	(Germany) Maximilian Kieffer	Won with bogey on fifth extra hole

=== Asian Tour wins (7) ===
Legend
International Series (1)
Other Asian Tour (6)

No.	Date	Tournament	Winning score	Margin of victory	Runner(s)-up
1	May 20, 2018	Asia-Pacific Classic^{1}	−16 (68-66-69-69=272)	2 strokes	(Australia) Adam Blyth, (Thailand) Natipong Srithong
2	Jul 7, 2018	Sarawak Championship	−22 (67-65-68-66=266)	1 stroke	(Thailand) Danthai Boonma, (Thailand) Jazz Janewattananond, (United States) Paul Peterson
3	Oct 7, 2018	Yeangder Tournament Players Championship^{2}	−15 (70-68-70-65=273)	2 strokes	(United States) Sihwan Kim
4	Nov 10, 2019	Thailand Open	−11 (67-70-69-67=273)	Playoff	(India) Shiv Kapur, (Thailand) Pavit Tangkamolprasert
5	Mar 17, 2024	International Series Macau	−23 (67-66-59-65=257)	Playoff	(Spain) David Puig
6	Apr 20, 2024	Saudi Open	−24 (65-67-62-66=260)	7 strokes	(Australia) Wade Ormsby
7	Oct 25, 2026	Link Hong Kong Open	−20 (65-66-65-64=260)	5 strokes	(Hong Kong) Matthew Cheung, (Finland) Kalle Samooja

^{1}Co-sanctioned by the China Tour
^{2}Co-sanctioned by the Taiwan PGA Tour

Asian Tour playoff record (2–2)

No.	Year	Tournament	Opponent(s)	Result
1	2019	Thailand Open	(India) Shiv Kapur, (Thailand) Pavit Tangkamolprasert	Won with birdie on first extra hole
2	2024	International Series Macau	(Spain) David Puig	Won with birdie on second extra hole
3	2024	International Series Morocco	(New Zealand) Ben Campbell	Lost to birdie on first extra hole
4	2024	Black Mountain Championship	(United States) M. J. Maguire	Lost to birdie on second extra hole

=== Challenge Tour wins (1) ===
No.	Date	Tournament	Winning score	Margin of victory	Runner-up
1	Jun 21, 2026	English Open	−18 (68-66-69-67=270)	Playoff	(Norway) Kristian Krogh Johannessen

Challenge Tour playoff record (1–0)

No.	Year	Tournament	Opponent	Result
1	2026	English Open	(Norway) Kristian Krogh Johannessen	Won with birdie on seventh extra hole

=== Asian Development Tour wins (2) ===
No.	Date	Tournament	Winning score	Margin of victory	Runner(s)-up
1	Nov 26, 2016	Combiphar Golf Invitational^{1}	−16 (70-64-67-67=268)	3 strokes	(Philippines) Antonio Lascuña, (United States) Micah Lauren Shin
2	Nov 11, 2017	EurAsia Perak Championship^{2}	−16 (68-70-67-67=272)	7 strokes	(Australia) Martin Dive

^{1}Co-sanctioned by the PGA Tour of Indonesia
^{2}Co-sanctioned by the Professional Golf of Malaysia Tour

=== All Thailand Golf Tour wins (1) ===
No.	Date	Tournament	Winning score	Margin of victory	Runner-up
1	Sep 2, 2018	Singha Chiang Mai Open	−25 (66-62-63-68=259)	7 strokes	(Thailand) Udorn Duangdecha

=== Taiwan PGA Tour wins (2) ===
No.	Date	Tournament	Winning score	Margin of victory	Runner(s)-up
1	Sep 10, 2017	Golden Eagle Open	−21 (64-67-68-68=267)	8 strokes	(Taiwan) Chang Wei-lun, (United States) Sam Cyr
2	Oct 7, 2018	Yeangder Tournament Players Championship^{1}	−15 (70-68-70-65=273)	2 strokes	(United States) Sihwan Kim

^{1}Co-sanctioned by the Asian Tour

=== Gateway Tour wins (1) ===
- 2013 Arizona Fall 5

== Results in major championships ==
Tournament	2021	2022	2023	2024	2025
Masters Tournament					
PGA Championship	CUT				CUT
U.S. Open					
The Open Championship	CUT	CUT		T16	CUT

Did not play

CUT = missed the half-way cut
"T" = tied

== Results in World Golf Championships ==
Tournament	2018
Championship	
Match Play	
Invitational	
Champions	T54

"T" = Tied

== See also ==
- Lowest rounds of golf
- List of golfers with most Asian Tour wins
- 2026 European Tour Qualifying School graduates
