= 2022 Asian Tour =

Golf tour season

2022 Asian Tour season
- Duration: 3 February 2022 – 4 December 2022
- Number of official events: 20 (Note: One further tournament was scheduled but was cancelled.)
- Most wins: (Taiwan) Chan Shih-chang (2) (United States) Sihwan Kim (2) (Thailand) Nitithorn Thippong (2)
- Order of Merit: (United States) Sihwan Kim
- International Series Order of Merit: (Zimbabwe) Scott Vincent
- Players' Player of the Year: (United States) Sihwan Kim
- Rookie of the Year: (South Korea) Kim Bi-o

The 2022 Asian Tour was the 27th season of the modern Asian Tour (formerly the Asian PGA Tour), the main professional golf tour in Asia (outside of Japan) since it was established in 1995.

== LIV Golf alliance ==
With LIV Golf's initial investment in the Asian Tour having been reported in late 2021, the 2022 season marked the introduction of the International Series, which was unveiled in February. The series was to consist of 10 events to be added to Asian Tour schedules over the following 10 years, with each event featuring prize funds between US$1,500,000 and $2,000,000. The investment being primarily backed by LIV Golf.

== Schedule ==
The following table lists official events during the 2022 season.

Date	Tournament	Host country	Purse (US$)	Winner (Note: The number in brackets after each winner's name is the number of Asian Tour events they had won up to and including that tournament. This information is only shown for Asian Tour members.)	OWGR points	Other tours (Note: ANZ − PGA Tour of Australasia; JPN − Japan Golf Tour; KOR − Korean Tour; LET − Ladies European Tour; PGTI − Professional Golf Tour of India; TWN − Taiwan PGA Tour.)	Notes
6 Feb	PIF Saudi International	Saudi Arabia	5,000,000	(United States) Harold Varner III (1)	50		Flagship event
27 Feb	Royal's Cup	Thailand	400,000	(Taiwan) Chan Shih-chang (4)	14		
6 Mar	International Series Thailand	Thailand	1,500,000	(United States) Sihwan Kim (1)	14		International Series (Note: Also a new tournament.)
27 Mar	DGC Open	India	500,000	(Thailand) Nitithorn Thippong (1)	10	PGTI	New tournament
~~3 Apr~~	New Zealand Open	New Zealand	–	Cancelled	–	ANZ	
10 Apr	Trust Golf Asian Mixed Cup	Thailand	750,000	(Thailand) Ratchanon Chantananuwat (a) (1)	14	LET	Mixed event
16 Apr	Trust Golf Asian Mixed Stableford Challenge	Thailand	750,000	(United States) Sihwan Kim (2)	14	LET	Mixed event
8 May	GS Caltex Maekyung Open	South Korea	₩1,200,000,000	(South Korea) Kim Bi-o (1)	12	KOR	
15 May	Asia Pacific Open Golf Championship Diamond Cup	Japan	¥100,000,000	(Japan) Shugo Imahira (1)	15	JPN	
5 Jun (Note: The International Series England was removed from the schedule in March 2022 following the announcement of the LIV Golf Invitational Series, which included an event with the same venue (Centurion Club) and dates. It was later readded to the schedule and held a week earlier than originally planned at a new venue, Slaley Hall in Northumberland.); ~~11 Jun~~	International Series England	England	2,000,000	(Zimbabwe) Scott Vincent (1)	14		International Series
26 Jun	Kolon Korea Open	South Korea	₩1,350,000,000	(South Korea) Kim Min-kyu (1)	12	KOR	
7 Aug	Mandiri Indonesia Open	Indonesia	500,000	(India) Gaganjeet Bhullar (10)	14		
14 Aug	International Series Singapore	Singapore	1,500,000	(Thailand) Nitithorn Thippong (2)	7.43		International Series
21 Aug	International Series Korea	South Korea	1,500,000	(South Korea) Ok Tae-hoon (1)	6.76		International Series
11 Sep	Shinhan Donghae Open	Japan	₩1,400,000,000	(Japan) Kazuki Higa (1)	9.03	JPN, KOR	
25 Sep	Yeangder TPC	Taiwan	700,000	(Australia) Travis Smyth (1)	2.29	TWN	
2 Oct	Mercuries Taiwan Masters	Taiwan	1,000,000	(Taiwan) Chan Shih-chang (5)	2.29	TWN	
6 Nov	International Series Morocco	Morocco	1,500,000	(Thailand) Jazz Janewattananond (7)	4.91		International Series
13 Nov	International Series Egypt	Egypt	1,500,000	(United States) Andy Ogletree (1)	4.49		International Series
27 Nov	Bangabandhu Cup Golf Bangladesh Open	Bangladesh	400,000	(Thailand) Danthai Boonma (2)	2.44		
4 Dec	BNI Indonesian Masters	Indonesia	1,500,000	(Thailand) Sarit Suwannarut (1)	5.91		International Series

== Order of Merit ==
The Order of Merit was based on prize money won during the season, calculated in U.S. dollars.

Position	Player	Prize money ($)
1	(United States) Sihwan Kim	627,458
2	(South Korea) Kim Bi-o	599,609
3	(Zimbabwe) Scott Vincent	517,845
4	(Thailand) Nitithorn Thippong	506,390
5	(Thailand) Sadom Kaewkanjana	487,909

== International Series Order of Merit ==
The International Series Order of Merit was based on prize money won during the International Series, calculated in U.S. dollars. The leading player on the International Series Order of Merit earned status to play in the 2023 LIV Golf League.

Position	Player	Prize money ($)
1	(Zimbabwe) Scott Vincent	517,845
2	(United States) Sihwan Kim	437,133
3	(Thailand) Jazz Janewattananond	388,094
4	(Canada) Richard T. Lee	365,315
5	(Thailand) Phachara Khongwatmai	346,455

== Awards ==
Award	Winner	Ref.
Players' Player of the Year	(United States) Sihwan Kim	
Rookie of the Year	(South Korea) Kim Bi-o	

== See also ==
- 2020–22 Asian Development Tour
