= Kane Webber =

Australian professional golfer

Personal information
- Nationality: Australia
- Born: 6 July 1980 (age 46) Lismore, Australia
- Height: 1.88 m (6 ft 2 in)
- Weight: 79 kg (174 lb; 12.4 st)

Career
- Sport: Golf
- College: University of Colorado
- Turned professional: 2004
- Former tours: Asian Tour; European Tour
- Professional wins: 4

Number of wins by tour
- Asian Tour: 1
- Other: 3

Kane Webber (born 6 July 1980) is an Australian professional golfer.

== Early life and amateur career ==
Webber was born in Lismore, New South Wales, Australia. He attended the University of Colorado in the United States.

== Professional career ==
In 2004, he turned professional. Webber played on the Asian Tour from 2006 to 2009, winning the Macau Open in May 2006. He played on the European Tour from 2007 to 2009 where his best finish was third at the 2008 Maybank Malaysian Open, an event co-sanctioned by the Asian Tour. He also played a handful of events on other tours: the Challenge Tour, PGA Tour, Nationwide Tour, PGA Tour of Australasia, ad OneAsia Tour.

== Personal life ==
In September 2005, he married Dawn Webber of Denver, Colorado and they have a daughter that was adopted from Ethiopia in 2009 and a son, also adopted from Ethiopia in 2012.

== Professional wins (4) ==
=== Asian Tour wins (1) ===
No.	Date	Tournament	Winning score	Margin of victory	Runner-up
1	21 May 2006	Macau Open	−9 (69-65-71-70=275)	3 strokes	(Australia) Scott Barr

=== Other wins (3) ===
- 2006 Wyoming Open
- 2011 Wyoming Open
- 2016 Wyoming Open
