= 2005 Asian Tour =

Golf tour season

2005 Asian Tour season
- Duration: 16 December 2004 – 11 December 2005
- Number of official events: 27
- Most wins: (Thailand) Thaworn Wiratchant (4)
- Order of Merit: (Thailand) Thaworn Wiratchant
- Players' Player of the Year: (Thailand) Thaworn Wiratchant
- Rookie of the Year: (India) Shiv Kapur

The 2005 Asian Tour was the 11th season of the modern Asian Tour (formerly the Asian PGA Tour), the main professional golf tour in Asia (outside of Japan) since it was established in 1995.

== Schedule ==
The following table lists official events during the 2005 season.

Date	Tournament	Host country	Purse (US$)	Winner (Note: The number in brackets after each winner's name is the number of Asian Tour events they had won up to and including that tournament. This information is only shown for Asian Tour members.)	OWGR points	Other tours (Note: AFR − Sunshine Tour; ANZ − PGA Tour of Australasia; EUR − European Tour; JPN − Japan Golf Tour; KOR − Korean Tour.)	Notes
19 Dec	Asia Japan Okinawa Open	Japan	¥100,000,000	(Japan) Kiyoshi Miyazato (n/a)	24	JPN	
30 Jan	Caltex Masters	Singapore	1,000,000	(England) Nick Dougherty (n/a)	30	EUR	
20 Feb	Carlsberg Malaysian Open	Malaysia	1,210,000	(Thailand) Thongchai Jaidee (7)	26	EUR	
27 Feb	Myanmar Open	Myanmar	200,000	(Australia) Scott Strange (1)	8		
6 Mar	Thai Airways International Thailand Open	Thailand	500,000	(New Zealand) Richard Lee (1)	6		
13 Mar	Qatar Masters	Qatar	1,500,000	(South Africa) Ernie Els (n/a)	26	EUR	New to Asian Tour
20 Mar	TCL Classic	China	1,000,000	(England) Paul Casey (1)	20	EUR	
27 Mar	Enjoy Jakarta Standard Chartered Indonesia Open	Indonesia	1,000,000	(Thailand) Thaworn Wiratchant (5)	16	EUR	
24 Apr	Johnnie Walker Classic	China	£1,250,000	(Australia) Adam Scott (n/a)	46	ANZ, EUR	
1 May	BMW Asian Open	China	1,500,000	(South Africa) Ernie Els (n/a)	38	EUR	
8 May	SK Telecom Open	South Korea	₩500,000,000	(South Korea) K. J. Choi (3)	14	KOR	
15 May	Macau Open	Macau	275,000	(Taiwan) Wang Ter-chang (3)	10		
22 May	Philippine Open	Philippines	200,000	(Australia) Adam Le Vesconte (1)	6		
29 May	KT&G Maekyung Open	South Korea	₩500,000,000	(South Korea) Choi Sang-ho (1)	6	KOR	
26 Jun	Brunei Open	Brunei	300,000	(Australia) Terry Pilkadaris (3)	6		New tournament
4 Sep	Volkswagen Masters-China	China	300,000	(South Africa) Retief Goosen (n/a)	20		
11 Sep	Singapore Open	Singapore	2,000,000	(Australia) Adam Scott (n/a)	22		
18 Sep	Taiwan Open	Taiwan	300,000	(Thailand) Thaworn Wiratchant (6)	6		
25 Sep	Mercuries Taiwan Masters	Taiwan	400,000	(Taiwan) Lu Wei-chih (1)	6		
2 Oct	Crowne Plaza Open	China	200,000	(Thailand) Prayad Marksaeng (5)	6		
16 Oct	Bangkok Airways Open	Thailand	200,000	(Taiwan) Lu Wen-teh (2)	6		New tournament
30 Oct	Hero Honda Indian Open	India	300,000	(Thailand) Thaworn Wiratchant (7)	8		
6 Nov	Double A International Open	Thailand	300,000	(Thailand) Chinnarat Phadungsil (a) (1)	6		New tournament
20 Nov	Carlsberg Masters Vietnam	Vietnam	200,000	(Thailand) Thaworn Wiratchant (8)	6		
27 Nov	Volvo China Open	China	1,300,000	(England) Paul Casey (2)	18	EUR	
4 Dec	UBS Hong Kong Open	Hong Kong	1,200,000	(Scotland) Colin Montgomerie (n/a)	28	EUR	
11 Dec	Volvo Masters of Asia	Thailand	600,000	(India) Shiv Kapur (1)	20		

=== Unofficial events ===
The following events were sanctioned by the Asian Tour, but did not carry official money, nor were wins official.

Date	Tournament	Host country	Purse ($)	Winner	OWGR points	Other tours	Notes
13 Nov	HSBC Champions	China	5,000,000	(England) David Howell	48	AFR, (Note: Sunshine Tour unofficial event) ANZ, (Note: PGA Tour of Australasia unofficial event) EUR	New limited-field event

== Order of Merit ==
The Order of Merit was titled as the UBS Order of Merit and was based on prize money won during the season, calculated in U.S. dollars.

Position	Player	Prize money ($)
1	(Thailand) Thaworn Wiratchant	510,123
2	(Thailand) Thongchai Jaidee	454,335
3	(India) Jyoti Randhawa	329,835
4	(India) Shiv Kapur	242,101
5	(Australia) Terry Pilkadaris	234,970

== Awards ==
Award	Winner	Ref.
Players' Player of the Year	(Thailand) Thaworn Wiratchant	
Rookie of the Year	(India) Shiv Kapur	
