= Indonesian Masters =

Coordinates: 6.2713°S 106.9016°E

BNI Indonesian Masters

Tournament information
- Location: Jakarta, Indonesia
- Established: 2011
- Course: Royale Jakarta Golf Club
- Par: 71
- Length: 7,324 yards (6,697 m)
- Tour: Asian Tour
- Format: Stroke play
- Prize fund: US$2,000,000
- Month played: October/November

Tournament record score
- Aggregate: 259 Justin Rose (2017)
- To par: −29 as above

Current champion
- (Canada) Richard T. Lee

Final champion
- Location in Indonesia

The Indonesian Masters is a golf tournament on the Asian Tour. It was first played in 2011.

In 2017, the Indonesian Masters became the Asian Tour's flagship event, replacing the Thailand Golf Championship which had been the flagship event up to 2015. Having not been held in 2020 and 2021 due to the COVID-19 pandemic, the tournament returned to the Asian Tour schedule in 2022 as part of the International Series.

== Winners ==
Asian Tour (International Series)	2022–
Asian Tour (Flagship event)	2017–2019
Asian Tour (Regular)	2011–2016

#	Year	Winner	Score	To par	Margin of victory	Runner(s)-up
BNI Indonesian Masters
12th	2024	(Canada) Richard T. Lee	265	−23	4 strokes	(Taiwan) Chang Wei-lun (Thailand) Phachara Khongwatmai
11th	2023	(India) Gaganjeet Bhullar	260	−24	5 strokes	(India) Karandeep Kochhar
10th	2022	(Thailand) Sarit Suwannarut	268	−20	4 strokes	(India) Anirban Lahiri
2020–21: No tournament
9th	2019	(Thailand) Jazz Janewattananond	265	−23	5 strokes	(Thailand) Gunn Charoenkul
8th	2018	(Thailand) Poom Saksansin (2)	268	−20	3 strokes	(Thailand) Jazz Janewattananond
Indonesian Masters
7th	2017	(England) Justin Rose	259	−29	8 strokes	(Thailand) Phachara Khongwatmai
BNI Indonesian Masters
6th	2016	(Thailand) Poom Saksansin	270	−18	5 strokes	(Japan) Masahiro Kawamura (Thailand) Phachara Khongwatmai (Thailand) Suradit Yongcharoenchai
CIMB Niaga Indonesian Masters
5th	2015	(England) Lee Westwood (3)	281	−7	Playoff	(Thailand) Chapchai Nirat
4th	2014	(India) Anirban Lahiri	271	−17	1 stroke	(South Korea) Baek Seuk-hyun (Australia) Cameron Smith
3rd	2013	(Austria) Bernd Wiesberger	273	−15	1 stroke	(South Africa) Ernie Els
2nd	2012	(England) Lee Westwood (2)	272	−16	2 strokes	(Thailand) Thaworn Wiratchant
Indonesian Masters
1st	2011	(England) Lee Westwood	269	−19	3 strokes	(Thailand) Thongchai Jaidee

== See also ==
- Indonesia Open
