= Royale Jakarta Golf Club =

Golf course in Jakarta, Indonesia

- Royale Jakarta Clubhouse Logo

Club information
- Location: Jl. Raya Halim Tiga, Halim Perdanakusuma - Jakarta Timur 13610
- Established: 2008
- Total holes: 27 (Three 9-hole course)
- Tournaments: Indonesian Masters, 2011
- Website: royalejakarta.com

Royale Jakarta Golf Club
- Designer: Robert Moore Jr. and JMP Group
- Par: 36 each course

Royale Jakarta Golf Club is a golf course located in Jakarta, Indonesia.

== Course ==
The 27-hole golf course at Royale Jakarta golf club consists of three, 9-hole courses:

- North Course
- South Course
- West Course

== Driving Range ==
Royale Jakarta has a practice range and gallery.

== Tournaments ==
The 1st and 2nd Indonesian Masters 21–24 April 2011 and 19–22 April 2012, was won by Lee Westwood. The 3rd Indonesian Masters will be held on 2–5 May 2013. The tournament was played on the South-West course with West course as holes 1 to 9 and South course as holes 10 to 18.

== Scorecard ==
North Course		Length From Tee Box (Meters)			
Hole #	Par	Black	Blue	White	Red
1 North	4	362	345	319	276
2 North	5	550	500	471	410
3 North	4	344	321	289	250
4 North	3	150	124	111	88
5 North	4	373	350	318	286
6 North	4	431	399	365	319
7 North	4	400	388	340	296
8 North	3	171	153	133	108
9 North	5	510	487	455	387
Total	36	3291	3067	2801	2420

South Course		Length From Tee Box (Meters)			
Hole #	Par	Black	Blue	White	Red
1 South	4	365	347	316	272
2 South	3	155	137	117	96
3 South	5	490	474	449	387
4 South	4	432	411	369	309
5 South	4	365	351	318	280
6 South	3	189	173	143	111
7 South	4	400	382	347	294
8 South	4	420	401	354	300
9 South	5	563	515	482	383
Total	36	3379	3191	2895	2423

West Course		Length From Tee Box (Meters)			
Hole #	Par	Black	Blue	White	Red
1 West	4	389	372	350	308
2 West	5	554	516	479	406
3 West	4	343	327	300	260
4 West	3	150	138	122	99
5 West	4	447	429	395	338
6 West	4	322	207	281	250
7 West	3	194	175	152	117
8 West	4	425	408	360	315
9 West	5	494	466	428	379
Total	36	3318	3138	2867	2472

== Course Ratings (unofficial) ==
Course Rating (18 Holes)
Course	North-South	South-West	West-North
Black Tee	77.3	77.5	77.1
Blue Tee	75.0	75.5	74.6
White Tee	72.9	73.0	72.3
Red Tee	73.4	73.7	73.2

Slope Rating (18 Holes)
Course	North-South	South-West	West-North
Black Tee	150	150	148
Blue Tee	142	142	140
White Tee	141	141	139
Red Tee	135	135	133
