= 2009 World Cup (men's golf) =

Coordinates: 22°47′9″N 114°0′25″E

Tournament information
- Dates: 26–29 November
- Location: Shenzhen, China
- Courses: Mission Hills Golf Club, Olazabal course
- Format: 72 holes stroke play (best ball & alternate shot)

Statistics
- Par: 72
- Length: 7,320 yards (6,690 m)
- Field: 28 two-man teams
- Cut: None
- Prize fund: US$5.5 million
- Winner's share: US$1.7 million

Champion
- Italy; Edoardo Molinari & Francesco Molinari
- 259 (−29)

The 2009 Omega Mission Hills World Cup took place from 26 November to 29 November at Mission Hills Golf Club in Shenzhen, China. It was the 55th World Cup. 28 countries competed as two-man teams. The team purse was $5,500,000 with $1,700,000 going to the winner. The event was won by Italy with a score of 259 (−29).

== Qualification and format ==
The leading 18 available players from the Official World Golf Ranking on 1 September 2009 qualified. These 18 players then selected a player from their country to compete with them. The person they pick had to be ranked within the top 100 on the Official World Golf Ranking as of 1 September. If there was no other player from that country within the top 100 then the next highest ranked player would be their partner. If there was no other available player from that country within the top 500, then the exempt player could choose whoever he wants as long as they are a professional from the same country. World qualifiers were held in September. Nine countries earned their spot in the World Cup, three each from the European, Asian, and South American qualifiers. The host country, China, rounded out the field.

The event was a 72-hole stroke play team event with each team consisting of two players. The first and third days were fourball play and the second and final days were foursomes play.

== Teams ==
Country	Players	Qualified
Argentina	Rafael Echenique and Estanislao Goya	OWGR
Australia	Robert Allenby and Stuart Appleby	OWGR
Brazil	Rafael Barcellos and Ronaldo Francisco	South American Qualifier
Canada	Stuart Anderson and Graham DeLaet	European Qualifier
Chile	Hugo León and Martin Ureta	South American Qualifier
China	Liang Wenchong and Zhang Lianwei	Host country
Denmark	Søren Kjeldsen and Søren Hansen	OWGR
England	Ross Fisher and Ian Poulter	OWGR
France	Christian Cévaër and Thomas Levet	OWGR
Germany	Alex Čejka and Martin Kaymer	OWGR
India	Jyoti Randhawa and Jeev Milkha Singh	OWGR
Ireland	Graeme McDowell and Rory McIlroy	OWGR
Italy	Edoardo Molinari and Francesco Molinari	OWGR
Japan	Hiroyuki Fujita and Ryuji Imada	OWGR
New Zealand	Danny Lee and David Smail	OWGR
Pakistan	Mohammed Shabbir Iqbal and Mohammed Munir	Asian Qualifier
Philippines	Mars Pucay and Angelo Que	Asian Qualifier
Scotland	David Drysdale and Alastair Forsyth	European Qualifier
Singapore	Lam Chih Bing and Mardan Mamat	Asian Qualifier
South Africa	Rory Sabbatini and Richard Sterne	OWGR
South Korea	Charlie Wi and Yang Yong-eun	OWGR
Spain	Gonzalo Fernández-Castaño and Sergio García	OWGR
Sweden	Robert Karlsson and Henrik Stenson	OWGR
Taiwan	Lin Wen-tang and Lu Wei-chih	OWGR
Thailand	Prayad Marksaeng and Thongchai Jaidee	OWGR
United States	John Merrick and Nick Watney	OWGR
Venezuela	Alfredo Adrian and Jhonattan Vegas	South American Qualifier
Wales	Stephen Dodd and Jamie Donaldson	European Qualifier

- Source

== Final leaderboard ==
Place	Country	Score	To par	Money (US$)
1	Italy	64-66-61-68=259	−29	1,700,000
T2	Ireland	58-68-64-70=260	−28	725,000
T2	Sweden	64-65-62-69=260	−28	725,000
4	England	66-69-63-64=262	−26	308,000
5	Japan	62-71-64-69=266	−22	230,000
6	Australia	68-70-62-67=267	−21	200,000
T7	Germany	66-71-66-65=268	−20	128,000
T7	South Africa	65-70-62-71=268	−20	128,000
T7	South Korea	64-75-61-68=268	−20	128,000
T7	United States	67-72-67-62=268	−20	128,000
T7	Wales	66-68-64-70=268	−20	128,000
T12	Chile	69-67-65-70=271	−17	80,000
T12	Venezuela	67-67-65-72=271	−17	80,000
T14	Denmark	66-70-66-70=272	−16	68,000
T14	India	67-68-65-72=272	−16	68,000
T16	Philippines	68-72-64-69=273	−15	62,000
T16	Singapore	66-70-66-71=273	−15	62,000
T16	Thailand	67-70-67-69=273	−15	62,000
19	Argentina	61-75-64-74=274	−14	58,000
T20	France	67-73-67-69=276	−12	55,000
T20	New Zealand	67-68-70-71=276	−12	55,000
T22	China	65-71-68-73=277	−11	50,000
T22	Pakistan	69-75-64-69=277	−11	50,000
T22	Taiwan	67-74-67-69=277	−11	50,000
25	Canada	64-74-65-76=279	−9	46,000
26	Brazil	68-75-68-69=280	−8	44,000
27	Spain	69-71-67-74=281	−7	42,000
28	Scotland	69-73-64-78=284	−4	40,000

- Source
