= Saudi International (golf) =

European Tour golf tournament

PIF Saudi International

Tournament information
- Location: Riyadh, Saudi Arabia
- Established: 2019
- Course: Riyadh Golf Club
- Par: 71
- Length: 7,411 yards (6,777 m)
- Organized by: IMG
- Tours: European Tour; Asian Tour
- Format: Stroke play
- Prize fund: US$5,000,000
- Month played: November

Tournament record score
- Aggregate: 261 Dustin Johnson (2019); 261 Abraham Ancer (2023)
- To par: −22 Josele Ballester (2025)

Current champion
- (Spain) Josele Ballester

Location map
- Location in Saudi Arabia

The Saudi International is a professional golf tournament. It was held at Royal Greens Golf & Country Club in King Abdullah Economic City, Saudi Arabia, from 2019 until 2023. The tournament moved to Riyadh Golf Club for the 2024 edition. The tournament has been title sponsored by the Public Investment Fund (PIF), a Saudi government sovereign wealth fund since 2022.

== History ==
Established in 2019 as a European Tour event, it was the first European Tour event to be played in Saudi Arabia and was one of six European Tour events staged in the countries on the Arabian Peninsula. The event has drawn criticism due to the involvement of Saudi Arabia's government in the event, based on their record of human rights within the country and their ventures of sportswashing. This included paying large appearance fees to some of the world's top players.

The tournament ceased to be a European Tour event after the 2021 edition, and later that year it was announced that as a result, the PGA Tour would not allow their members to compete in future editions, with the European Tour expected to do the same. In September 2021, it was announced that it would become part of the Asian Tour's schedule. This involved a ten-year deal starting in 2022, with an increased prize fund of US$5,000,000. In October, it was announced that the event would become the flagship event of the Asian Tour. In December, the PGA Tour revealed that they would grant their members releases to play in the event in 2022; on the condition that they committed to play in the AT&T Pebble Beach Pro-Am in some form in the following years.

In January 2022, it was announced that the Saudi Public Investment Fund had become the new title sponsor of the event.

== Winners ==
Asian Tour (International Series)	2024–
Asian Tour (Flagship event)	2022
European Tour/Asian Tour (Regular)	2019–2021, 2023

#	Year	Tour (Note: ASA − Asian Tour; EUR − European Tour.)	Winner	Score	To par	Margin of victory	Runner(s)-up	Purse (US$)	Winner's share ($)	Venue
PIF Saudi International
7th	2025	ASA	(Spain) Josele Ballester	262	−22	3 strokes	(United States) Caleb Surratt	5,000,000	1,000,000	Riyadh GC
6th	2024	ASA	(Chile) Joaquín Niemann	263	−21	Playoff	(Australia) Cameron Smith (United States) Caleb Surratt	5,000,000	1,000,000	Riyadh GC
5th	2023	ASA	(Mexico) Abraham Ancer	261	−19	2 strokes	(United States) Cameron Young	5,000,000	1,000,000	Royal Greens
4th	2022	ASA	(United States) Harold Varner III	267	−13	1 stroke	(United States) Bubba Watson	5,000,000	1,000,000	Royal Greens
Saudi International
3rd	2021	EUR	(United States) Dustin Johnson (2)	265	−15	2 strokes	(United States) Tony Finau (England) Justin Rose	3,500,000	572,778	Royal Greens
2nd	2020	EUR	(Northern Ireland) Graeme McDowell	268	−12	2 strokes	(United States) Dustin Johnson	3,500,000	583,330	Royal Greens
1st	2019	EUR	(United States) Dustin Johnson	261	−19	2 strokes	(China) Li Haotong	3,500,000	583,330	Royal Greens

== See also ==
- Saudi Open
