= Chan Shih-chang =

Taiwanese professional golfer

Personal information
- Nationality: Taiwan
- Born: 7 June 1986 (age 40)
- Height: 168 cm (5 ft 6 in)
- Weight: 67 kg (148 lb)

Career
- Sport: Golf
- College: Taipei Physical Education College
- Turned professional: 2008
- Current tours: Asian Tour; Taiwan PGA Tour
- Former tours: European Tour; Japan Golf Tour; OneAsia Tour; PGA Tour China; Asian Development Tour
- Professional wins: 28

Number of wins by tour
- European Tour: 1
- Japan Golf Tour: 1
- Asian Tour: 5
- Other: 23

Achievements and awards
- Taiwan PGA Tour Order of Merit winner: 2022, 2023
Medal record
Representing Chinese Taipei
Asian Games
Bronze medal – third place	2006 Doha	Men's team

Chan Shih-chang (Chinese: 詹世昌; born 7 June 1986) is a Taiwanese professional golfer, who plays on the Asian Tour.

== Amateur career ==
As an amateur, Chan won the 2004 Hong Kong Amateur Open and competed in the 2006 Asian Games, winning the bronze medal in the men's team event.

== Professional career ==
Chan turned professional in 2008 and has competed on several tours in Asia; the Japan Golf Tour, the Asian Tour, the Asian Development Tour, the PGA Tour China and the OneAsia Tour. He has also competed on the European Tour. Chan has had much success on the Asian Development Tour where he has won six times, including three wins in 2014 when he finished second on the Order of Merit.

He won the Eternal Courtyard Open on the PGA Tour China in 2015.

Chan's biggest win came at the 2016 King's Cup, an event co-sanctioned by the Asian Tour and the European Tour. Later in 2016 he won the Asia-Pacific Diamond Cup Golf in Japan, an event co-sanctioned by the Japan Golf Tour and the Asian Tour.

In November 2021, Chan won the Blue Canyon Phuket Championship on the Asian Tour, the first event to return on the tour since the COVID-19 shutdown. He won by one shot ahead of Sadom Kaewkanjana and Tom Kim.

A few months later, Chan won the Royal's Cup, winning again over Sadom Kaewkanjana as well as Sihwan Kim. In October 2022, Chan won the Mercuries Taiwan Masters after defeating Rashid Khan in a playoff.

== Amateur wins ==
- 2004 Hong Kong Amateur Open

== Professional wins (28) ==
=== European Tour wins (1) ===
No.	Date	Tournament	Winning score	Margin of victory	Runner-up
1	31 Jul 2016	King's Cup^{1}	−12 (71-67-63-67=268)	2 strokes	(Taiwan) Lin Wen-tang

^{1}Co-sanctioned by the Asian Tour

=== Japan Golf Tour wins (1) ===
No.	Date	Tournament	Winning score	Margin of victory	Runner-up
1	25 Sep 2016	Asia-Pacific Diamond Cup Golf^{1}	−10 (71-68-69-62=270)	2 strokes	(Japan) Ippei Koike

^{1}Co-sanctioned by the Asian Tour

=== Asian Tour wins (5) ===
No.	Date	Tournament	Winning score	Margin of victory	Runner(s)-up
1	31 Jul 2016	King's Cup^{1}	−12 (71-67-63-67=268)	2 strokes	(Taiwan) Lin Wen-tang
2	25 Sep 2016	Asia-Pacific Diamond Cup Golf^{2}	−10 (71-68-69-62=270)	2 strokes	(Japan) Ippei Koike
3	28 Nov 2021	Blue Canyon Phuket Championship	−18 (66-68-68-68=270)	1 stroke	(Thailand) Sadom Kaewkanjana, (South Korea) Tom Kim
4	27 Feb 2022	Royal's Cup	−23 (64-66-67-68=265)	3 strokes	(Thailand) Sadom Kaewkanjana, (United States) Sihwan Kim
5	2 Oct 2022	Mercuries Taiwan Masters^{3}	−15 (68-69-69-68=273)	Playoff	(India) Rashid Khan

^{1}Co-sanctioned by the European Tour
^{2}Co-sanctioned by the Japan Golf Tour
^{3}Co-sanctioned by the Taiwan PGA Tour

Asian Tour playoff record (1–0)

No.	Year	Tournament	Opponent	Result
1	2022	Mercuries Taiwan Masters	(India) Rashid Khan	Won with birdie on second extra hole

=== PGA Tour China wins (1) ===
No.	Date	Tournament	Winning score	Margin of victory	Runner-up
1	17 May 2015	Eternal Courtyard Open	−9 (71-77-67-64=279)	3 strokes	(China) Zhang Xinjun

=== Asian Development Tour wins (6) ===
No.	Date	Tournament	Winning score	Margin of victory	Runner(s)-up
1	7 Sep 2013	UMW Sabah Classic^{1}	−7 (72-70-72-67=281)	Playoff	(United States) James Bowen
2	24 Apr 2014	LADA Langkawi Championship^{1}	−19 (64-67-70-68=269)	1 stroke	(Singapore) Koh Deng Shan
3	24 May 2014	Johor Championship^{1}	−12 (69-73-67-67=276)	Playoff	(Australia) Jack Munro
4	27 Jul 2014	Taifong Open^{2}	−4 (73-72-67=212)	Playoff	(Taiwan) Hsieh Tung-shu, (Taiwan) Sung Mao-chang, (Philippines) Miguel Tabuena, (Thailand) Suppakorn Uthaipat
5	23 May 2015	Ambassador ADT^{2}	−12 (69-67-68=204)	4 strokes	(Taiwan) Lin Wen-tang
6	19 Aug 2018	Taifong Open^{2} (2)	−13 (71-65-71-68=275)	2 strokes	(United States) Han Lee, (Thailand) Chinnarat Phadungsil

^{1}Co-sanctioned by the Professional Golf of Malaysia Tour
^{2}Co-sanctioned by the Taiwan PGA Tour

=== Taiwan PGA Tour wins (14) ===
No.	Date	Tournament	Winning score	Margin of victory	Runner(s)-up
1	27 Jul 2014	Taifong Open^{1}	−4 (73-72-67=212)	Playoff	(Taiwan) Hsieh Tung-shu, (Taiwan) Sung Mao-chang, (Philippines) Miguel Tabuena, (Thailand) Suppakorn Uthaipat
2	23 May 2015	Ambassador ADT^{1}	−12 (69-67-68=204)	4 strokes	(Taiwan) Lin Wen-tang
3	28 Aug 2016	Sun Flower TPGA Championship	−10 (68-67-71-72=278)	1 stroke	(Taiwan) Lee Chieh-po
4	31 Dec 2016	Taiwan Strong Foundation Elite Invitational	−16 (70-65-65=200)	6 strokes	(Taiwan) Yeh Yu-chen
5	4 Aug 2017	Wai Hung Yeangder Cup	−8 (69-70-69=208)	1 stroke	(Taiwan) Hung Chien-yao, (Taiwan) Lin Wen-tang
6	19 Aug 2018	Taifong Open^{1} (2)	−13 (71-65-71-68=275)	2 strokes	(United States) Han Lee, (Thailand) Chinnarat Phadungsil
7	19 Sep 2021	Daan Open	−17 (67-69-69-66=271)	3 strokes	(Taiwan) Lee Chieh-po
8	26 Mar 2022	Chang Wah Open	−12 (72-69-64-71=276)	1 stroke	(Taiwan) Chang Wei-lun
9	16 Sep 2022	Dingbang Elite Invitational (2)	−12 (66-70-68=204)	3 strokes	(Taiwan) Hsieh Chi-hsien, (Taiwan) Liao Huan-jyun
10	2 Oct 2022	Mercuries Taiwan Masters^{2}	−15 (68-69-69-68=273)	Playoff	(India) Rashid Khan
11	21 Oct 2022	Taiwan Open	−20 (70-69-64-65=268)	1 stroke	(Taiwan) Chang Wei-lun
12	28 May 2023	Sun Flower TPGA Championship (2)	−13 (67-67-73-68=275)	5 strokes	(Taiwan) Hung Chien-yao
13	14 Jul 2023	Chasing Dreams Open	−23 (65-66-69-65=265)	6 strokes	(Taiwan) Liu Yen-hung
14	4 Jul 2026	Din Yue Open	−19 (66-67-67-69=269)	1 stroke	(Japan) Shori Ishizuka, (Taiwan) Wan Wei-hsuan

^{1}Co-sanctioned by the Asian Development Tour
^{2}Co-sanctioned by the Asian Tour

=== Other wins (6) ===
- 2010 Taifong Open (Chinese Taipei)
- 2011 Camry Invitational (China)
- 2012 Kaohsiung Open (Chinese Taipei)
- 2014 Meridigen Technology Cup (Chinese Taipei), TPGA Championship (Chinese Taipei), Ashou Cup (Chinese Taipei)

== Results in World Golf Championships ==
Tournament	2016
Championship	
Match Play	
Invitational	
Champions	T60

Did not play

"T" = Tied

== Team appearances ==
Amateur

- Eisenhower Trophy (representing Taiwan): 2006
- Bonallack Trophy (representing Asia/Pacific): 2008

Professional

- World Cup (representing Taiwan): 2016

== See also ==
- List of golfers with most Asian Tour wins
