= 2011 Asian Tour =

Golf tour season

2011 Asian Tour season
- Duration: 17 February 2011 – 18 December 2011
- Number of official events: 22
- Most wins: (Taiwan) Lu Wei-chih (2) (Note: Lee Westwood won three events, but was not an Asian Tour member.)
- Order of Merit: (Philippines) Juvic Pagunsan
- Players' Player of the Year: (Philippines) Juvic Pagunsan
- Rookie of the Year: (South Africa) Tjaart van der Walt

The 2011 Asian Tour was the 17th season of the modern Asian Tour (formerly the Asian PGA Tour), the main professional golf tour in Asia (outside of Japan) since it was established in 1995.

== Schedule ==
The following table lists official events during the 2011 season.

Date	Tournament	Host country	Purse (US$)	Winner (Note: The number in brackets after each winner's name is the number of Asian Tour events they had won up to and including that tournament. This information is only shown for Asian Tour members.)	OWGR points	Other tours (Note: EUR − European Tour; JPN − Japan Golf Tour; KOR − Korean Tour; PGAT − PGA Tour; PGTI − Professional Golf Tour of India.)	Notes
20 Feb	Avantha Masters	India	€1,800,000	(India) Shiv Chawrasia (2)	20	EUR	
25 Mar	SAIL Open	India	300,000	(Thailand) Kiradech Aphibarnrat (1)	14		
9 Apr	Panasonic Open (India)	India	300,000	(India) Anirban Lahiri (1)	14	PGTI	New tournament
17 Apr	Maybank Malaysian Open	Malaysia	2,500,000	(Italy) Matteo Manassero (n/a)	42	EUR	
24 Apr	Indonesian Masters	Indonesia	750,000	(England) Lee Westwood (n/a)	20		New tournament
1 May	Ballantine's Championship	South Korea	€2,205,000	(England) Lee Westwood (n/a)	42	EUR, KOR	
15 May	ICTSI Philippine Open	Philippines	300,000	(United States) Berry Henson (1)	14		
19 Jun	Queen's Cup	Thailand	300,000	(Thailand) Chawalit Plaphol (3)	14		
23 Jul	Worldwide Holdings Selangor Masters	Malaysia	RM1,200,000	(Finland) Joonas Granberg (1)	14		
4 Sep	Omega European Masters	Switzerland	€2,000,000	(Denmark) Thomas Bjørn (n/a)	44	EUR	
11 Sep	ISPS Handa Singapore Classic	Singapore	400,000	(India) Himmat Rai (1)	14		
18 Sep	Macau Open	Macau	750,000	(Taiwan) Chan Yih-shin (2)	14		
25 Sep	Asia-Pacific Panasonic Open	Japan	¥150,000,000	(Japan) Tetsuji Hiratsuka (4)	22	JPN	
9 Oct	Yeangder Tournament Players Championship	Taiwan	300,000	(Taiwan) Lu Wei-chih (2)	14		
16 Oct	Hero Indian Open	India	1,250,000	(Australia) David Gleeson (3)	14		
23 Oct	CJ Invitational	South Korea	750,000	(South Korea) K. J. Choi (5)	14	KOR	New tournament
30 Oct	CIMB Asia Pacific Classic Malaysia	Malaysia	6,100,000	(United States) Bo Van Pelt (n/a)	30	PGAT (Note: PGA Tour unofficial event)	Limited-field event
6 Nov	Mercuries Taiwan Masters	Taiwan	600,000	(Taiwan) Lu Wei-chih (3)	14		
13 Nov	Barclays Singapore Open	Singapore	6,000,000	(Spain) Gonzalo Fernández-Castaño (n/a)	46	EUR	
20 Nov	Iskandar Johor Open	Malaysia	2,000,000	(Netherlands) Joost Luiten (n/a)	24	EUR	
4 Dec	UBS Hong Kong Open	Hong Kong	2,750,000	(Northern Ireland) Rory McIlroy (n/a)	38	EUR	
~~11 Dec~~	King's Cup	Thailand	–	Cancelled (Note: Cancelled due to flooding.)	–		
18 Dec	Thailand Golf Championship	Thailand	1,000,000	(England) Lee Westwood (n/a)	32		New flagship event

== Order of Merit ==
The Order of Merit was based on prize money won during the season, calculated in U.S. dollars.

Position	Player	Prize money ($)
1	(Philippines) Juvic Pagunsan	788,299
2	(Japan) Tetsuji Hiratsuka	456,668
3	(India) Shiv Chawrasia	444,529
4	(South Africa) Jbe' Kruger	362,234
5	(Thailand) Thaworn Wiratchant	340,942

== Awards ==
Award	Winner	Ref.
Players' Player of the Year	(Philippines) Juvic Pagunsan	
Rookie of the Year	(South Africa) Tjaart van der Walt	

== See also ==
- 2011 Asian Development Tour
