= Lin Wen-tang =

Taiwanese professional golfer

Lin Wen-tang 林文堂
Personal information
- Nationality: Taiwan
- Born: 28 June 1974 (age 52) Hsinchu City, Taiwan
- Height: 6 ft 1 in (1.85 m)

Career
- Sport: Golf
- Turned professional: 1996
- Former tours: European Tour; Asian Tour; Taiwan PGA Tour
- Professional wins: 12
- Highest ranking: 47 (4 January 2009)

Number of wins by tour
- European Tour: 1
- Asian Tour: 6
- Other: 6

Best results in major championships
- Masters Tournament: CUT: 2009
- PGA Championship: DNP
- U.S. Open: DNP
- The Open Championship: DNP

Achievements and awards
- Taiwan PGA Tour Order of Merit winner: 2015, 2018, 2019

Lin Wen-tang (Chinese: 林文堂, born 28 June 1974) is a Taiwanese professional golfer. He comes from a golfing family, with his father and uncle both being professionals and two brothers who played with him on the Asian Tour.

== Career ==
In 1996, Lin turned professional. He won for the first time as at the 1998 Hsin Fong Open, a non-tour event in his home country. He has played on the Asian Tour since 1998 and has won four titles, his first coming in 2006 at the Taiwan Open. His second Asian Tour victory came in 2007 at the Brunei Open, and in 2008 he won the inaugural Asian Tour International in Thailand.

In April 2008, Lin reached the top 100 of the Official World Golf Rankings, and then in November, he recorded the biggest win of his career at the UBS Hong Kong Open, a European Tour co-sanctioned event, defeating Rory McIlroy and Francesco Molinari in a playoff. The win earned Lin a two-year exemption on the European Tour. He finished 2008 in the world top 50 to qualify for the 2009 Masters.

== Professional wins (12) ==
=== European Tour wins (1) ===
| No. | Date | Tournament | Winning score | Margin of victory | Runners-up |
|---|---|---|---|---|---|
| 1 | 23 Nov 2008 (2009 season) | UBS Hong Kong Open^{1} | −15 (65-69-64-67=265) | Playoff | (Northern Ireland) Rory McIlroy, (Italy) Francesco Molinari |

^{1}Co-sanctioned by the Asian Tour

European Tour playoff record (1–0)

| No. | Year | Tournament | Opponents | Result |
|---|---|---|---|---|
| 1 | 2008 | UBS Hong Kong Open | (Northern Ireland) Rory McIlroy, (Italy) Francesco Molinari | Won with birdie on second extra hole Molinari eliminated by birdie on first hole |

=== Asian Tour wins (6) ===
| No. | Date | Tournament | Winning score | Margin of victory | Runner(s)-up |
|---|---|---|---|---|---|
| 1 | 8 Oct 2006 | Taiwan Open | −13 (70-68-68-69=275) | 3 strokes | (Scotland) Simon Yates |
| 2 | 2 Sep 2007 | Brunei Open | −15 (65-68-71-65=269) | 2 strokes | (Australia) Adam Le Vesconte |
| 3 | 23 Mar 2008 | Asian Tour International | −23 (65-68-68-64=265) | 5 strokes | (South Korea) Noh Seung-yul |
| 4 | 23 Nov 2008 | UBS Hong Kong Open^{1} | −15 (65-69-64-67=265) | Playoff | (Northern Ireland) Rory McIlroy, (Italy) Francesco Molinari |
| 5 | 4 Oct 2009 | Mercuries Taiwan Masters | −8 (71-66-71-72=280) | 3 strokes | (Taiwan) Lu Wen-teh |
| 6 | 14 Apr 2013 | Solaire Open | −3 (69-73-70-73=285) | 1 stroke | (Canada) Richard T. Lee, (Thailand) Thammanoon Sriroj |

^{1}Co-sanctioned by the European Tour

Asian Tour playoff record (1–2)

| No. | Year | Tournament | Opponents | Result |
|---|---|---|---|---|
| 1 | 2006 | Crowne Plaza Open | (Thailand) Prom Meesawat, (Thailand) Chinnarat Phadungsil | Phadungsil won with par on second extra hole Lin eliminated by par on first hole |
| 2 | 2008 | UBS Hong Kong Open | (Northern Ireland) Rory McIlroy, (Italy) Francesco Molinari | Won with birdie on second extra hole Molinari eliminated by birdie on first hole |
| 3 | 2015 | Ho Tram Open | (Spain) Sergio García, (India) Himmat Rai, (Thailand) Thaworn Wiratchant | García won with par on second extra hole Lin and Wiratchant eliminated by birdie on first hole |

=== Asian Development Tour wins (2) ===
| No. | Date | Tournament | Winning score | Margin of victory | Runner(s)-up |
|---|---|---|---|---|---|
| 1 | 29 Aug 2010 | Ballantine's Taiwan Championship^{1} | −10 (72-70-66-70=278) | 1 stroke | (Taiwan) Hsu Chia-jen |
| 2 | 3 Aug 2014 | Ballantine's Taiwan Championship^{1} (2) | −21 (68-64-67-68=267) | 6 strokes | (Sweden) Nils Floren, (Taiwan) Chan Shih-chang |

^{1}Co-sanctioned by the Taiwan PGA Tour

=== Taiwan PGA Tour wins (4) ===
| No. | Date | Tournament | Winning score | Margin of victory | Runner(s)-up |
|---|---|---|---|---|---|
| 1 | 29 Aug 2010 | Ballantine's Taiwan Championship^{1} | −10 (72-70-66-70=278) | 1 stroke | (Taiwan) Hsu Chia-jen |
| 2 | 3 Aug 2014 | Ballantine's Taiwan Championship^{1} (2) | −21 (68-64-67-68=267) | 6 strokes | (Sweden) Nils Floren, (Taiwan) Chan Shih-chang |
| 3 | 22 Dec 2017 | Taiwan Strong Foundation Elite Invitational | −20 (62-66-68=196) | 7 strokes | (Taiwan) Kao Teng |
| 4 | 3 Dec 2021 | Mizuno Open | −11 (69-66-71-71=277) | Playoff | (Taiwan) Hsu Li-peng |

^{1}Co-sanctioned by the Asian Development Tour

=== Other wins (2) ===
- 1998 Hsin Fong Open
- 2004 ROC PGA Championship

== Results in major championships ==
| Tournament | 2009 |
|---|---|
| Masters Tournament | CUT |

CUT = missed the halfway cut
Note: Lin only played in the Masters Tournament.

== Results in World Golf Championships ==
| Tournament | 2009 |
|---|---|
| Match Play | R64 |
| Championship | T66 |
| Invitational | |
| Champions | T33 |

Did not play

QF, R16, R32, R64 = Round in which player lost in match play
"T" = Tied

== Team appearances ==
Amateur

- Eisenhower Trophy (representing Taiwan): 1992

Professional

- World Cup (representing Taiwan): 2008, 2009

== See also ==
- List of golfers with most Asian Tour wins
