= Lee Chieh-po =

Taiwanese professional golfer (born 1994)

Personal information
- Nickname: Max
- Nationality: Taiwan
- Born: 1 November 1994 (age 32) Taipei, Taiwan
- Height: 1.65 m (5 ft 5 in)

Career
- Sport: Golf
- Turned professional: 2015
- Current tours: Asian Tour; Taiwan PGA Tour
- Former tour: LIV Golf
- Professional wins: 9

Number of wins by tour
- Asian Tour: 1
- Other: 8

Achievements and awards
- Taiwan PGA Tour Order of Merit winner: 2021

Lee Chieh-po (Chinese: 李玠柏, born 1 November 1994), also known as Max Lee, is a Taiwanese professional golfer.

== Early life and family ==
Lee was born in Taipei, Taiwan. He has been known as Max since he was six.

== Amateur career ==
Lee represented Asia-Pacific in the 2014 Bonallack Trophy.

== Professional career ==
Lee turned professional in 2015. Most of his early career was spent playing in Taiwan and on lower level tours, including the PGA Tour China and Asian Development Tour. His first win as a professional came in a minor event in Taiwan during his first season. His breakthrough came in 2021, during the COVID-19 pandemic, when he won a record five times on the Taiwan PGA Tour, including the Yeangder TPC, to win the Order of Merit. In October 2024, he won for the first time on the Asian Tour, at the International Series Thailand, edging out Peter Uihlein by one stroke. Two months later, he won the LIV Golf Promotions event to earn a place on the 2025 LIV Golf League.

== Professional wins (9) ==
=== Asian Tour wins (1) ===
Legend
International Series (1)
Other Asian Tour (0)

No.	Date	Tournament	Winning score	Margin of victory	Runners-up
1	27 Oct 2024	International Series Thailand	−21 (64-65-67-63=259)	1 stroke	(Canada) Richard T. Lee, (United States) Peter Uihlein

=== Taiwan PGA Tour wins (7) ===
No.	Date	Tournament	Winning score	Margin of victory	Runner(s)-up
1	9 May 2021	Yeangder Open	−14 (70-71-70-65=274)	5 strokes	(Taiwan) Chan Shih-chang
2	3 Sep 2021	Nan Pao Open	−15 (70-64-68-71=273)	2 strokes	(Taiwan) Chan Shih-chang, (Taiwan) Lin Kuan-po
3	30 Oct 2021	Kaohsiung Open	−8 (71-69-70-70=280)	Playoff	(Taiwan) Wang Wei-hsuan
4	20 Nov 2021	Yeangder TPC	−16 (69-66-67-70=272)	1 stroke	(Taiwan) Chan Shih-chang
5	2 Jan 2022 (2021 season)	Taifong Open	−11 (67-65-70-71=273)	5 strokes	(Taiwan) Hung Chien-yao
6	11 Nov 2022	Taichung Charity Elite Open	−19 (69-65-70-65=269)	3 strokes	(Taiwan) Ho Yu-cheng
7	2 Jun 2024	Sun Flower TPGA Championship	−8 (73-72-64-71=280)	1 stroke	(Taiwan) Hung Chien-yao

=== Other wins (1) ===
- 2024 LIV Golf Promotions

== Team appearances ==
- Bonallack Trophy (representing Asia-Pacific): 2014
