= Lu Wen-teh =

Taiwanese golfer

Personal information
- Nationality: Taiwan
- Born: 26 February 1963 (age 63)

Career
- Sport: Golf
- Turned professional: 1992
- Current tour: Japan PGA Senior Tour
- Former tours: Asian Tour; Asia Golf Circuit; Taiwan PGA Tour
- Professional wins: 13

Number of wins by tour
- Asian Tour: 5
- Other: 8

Lu Wen-teh (Chinese: 呂文德; born 26 February 1963) is a Taiwanese professional golfer.

== Career ==
Lu turned professional in 1992 and plays on the Asian Tour where he has five wins.

== Professional wins (13) ==
=== Asian Tour wins (5) ===
| No. | Date | Tournament | Winning score | Margin of victory | Runner(s)-up |
|---|---|---|---|---|---|
| 1 | 1 Nov 1998 | Ericsson Classic | −8 (66-72-72-70=280) | Playoff | (Philippines) Felix Casas, (Mexico) Carlos Espinosa |
| 2 | 16 Oct 2005 | Bangkok Airways Open | −7 (69-69-67-72=277) | Playoff | (Thailand) Thammanoon Sriroj |
| 3 | 20 May 2007 | Macau Open | −12 (65-71-65=201) (Note: Shortened to 54 holes due to weather.) | Playoff | (Australia) Richard Moir |
| 4 | 23 Sep 2007 | Mercuries Taiwan Masters | −4 (72-71-69-72=284) | 3 strokes | (South Korea) Ted Oh |
| 5 | 21 Sep 2008 | Mercuries Taiwan Masters (2) | −11 (70-67-69-71=277) | 2 strokes | (Thailand) Thaworn Wiratchant |

Asian Tour playoff record (3–1)

| No. | Year | Tournament | Opponent(s) | Result |
|---|---|---|---|---|
| 1 | 1998 | Ericsson Classic | (Philippines) Felix Casas, (Mexico) Carlos Espinosa | Won with birdie on second extra hole Casas eliminated by birdie on first hole |
| 2 | 2005 | Bangkok Airways Open | (Thailand) Thammanoon Sriroj | Won with par on first extra hole |
| 3 | 2007 | Macau Open | (Australia) Richard Moir | Won with birdie on third extra hole |
| 4 | 2008 | Brunei Open | (Australia) Rick Kulacz | Lost to birdie on first extra hole |

=== Asia Golf Circuit wins (1) ===
| No. | Date | Tournament | Winning score | Margin of victory | Runners-up |
|---|---|---|---|---|---|
| 1 | 4 Mar 1990 | Thai International Thailand Open | −12 (69-64-70-73=276) | 1 stroke | (Canada) Danny Mijovic, (South Korea) Park Nam-sin |

=== Taiwan PGA Tour wins (4) ===
| No. | Date | Tournament | Winning score | Margin of victory | Runner-up |
|---|---|---|---|---|---|
| 1 | 14 Aug 2015 | Luncheon TPC Classic | −11 (69-68-68=205) | Playoff | (Taiwan) Sung Mao-chang |
| 2 | 23 Sep 2016 | Kaohsiung Open | −9 (71-71-69-68=279) | 2 strokes | (Taiwan) Lu Chien-soon |
| 3 | 30 Oct 2016 | Golden Eagle Open | −16 (70-68-67-67=272) | 3 strokes | (Taiwan) Yang Fei-hao |
| 4 | 29 Jun 2018 | Tamsui Centennial Open | −14 (68-67-68-71=274) | 4 strokes | (Taiwan) Yeh Yu-chen |

=== Other wins (3) ===
- 1994 Mercuries Masters
- 1996 Mercuries Masters
- 2008 Kunming Championship (China)

== Team appearances ==
Amateur

- Eisenhower Trophy (representing Taiwan): 1988

Professional

- Dunhill Cup (representing Taiwan): 1995
- World Cup (representing Taiwan): 2008

== See also ==
- List of golfers with most Asian Tour wins
