= Taiwan PGA Tour =

Professional golf tour

- Current season, competition or edition: 2026 Taiwan PGA Tour
- Sport: Golf
- Country: Based in Taiwan (Note: Schedules have also included events in the Philippines and Thailand.)
- Related competitions: Taiwan LPGA Tour
- Website: https://tpga.org.tw/

The Taiwan PGA Tour is the main professional golf tour for men in Taiwan.

In January 2025, the Official World Golf Ranking announced that the Taiwan PGA Tour would receive world ranking points from the start of the 2025 season.

== Order of Merit winners ==
Season	Winner	Prize money (NT$)
2026	(Taiwan) Hung Chien-yao (2)	11,944,754
2025	(Taiwan) Wang Wei-hsuan (2)	6,708,705
2024	(Thailand) Suteepat Prateeptienchai	8,888,480
2023	(Taiwan) Chan Shih-chang (2)	3,672,800
2022	(Taiwan) Chan Shih-chang	8,690,506
2021	(Taiwan) Lee Chieh-po	4,591,250
2020	(Taiwan) Wang Wei-hsuan	2,582,180
2019	(Taiwan) Lin Wen-tang (3)	2,189,161
2018	(Taiwan) Lin Wen-tang (2)	3,234,375
2017	(Taiwan) Hung Chien-yao	1,856,000
2016	(Taiwan) Lu Wei-chih	6,308,639
2015	(Taiwan) Lin Wen-tang	1,964,081
