= Marcus Both =

Australian professional golfer

Personal information
- Nationality: Australia
- Born: 8 June 1979 (age 47) Horsham, Australia
- Height: 1.91 m (6 ft 3 in)
- Weight: 92 kg (203 lb; 14.5 st)

Career
- Sport: Golf
- Turned professional: 2003
- Current tour: Asian Tour
- Professional wins: 3

Number of wins by tour
- Asian Tour: 3

Achievements and awards
- Asian PGA Tour Rookie of the Year: 2003

Marcus Both (born 8 June 1979) is an Australian professional golfer.

== Professional career ==
In 2003, Both turned professional. He has played on the Asian Tour since then, winning three times, including the 2003 PRC Sanya Open and the 2009 Johnnie Walker Cambodian Open.

His most recent victory however, came at the 2014 ICTSI Philippine Open with a final round 70 ensuring a two stroke win.

== Professional wins (3) ==
=== Asian Tour wins (3) ===
No.	Date	Tournament	Winning score	Margin of victory	Runner(s)-up
1	26 Oct 2003	Sanya Open	−13 (68-70-70-67=275)	1 stroke	(South Africa) Hendrik Buhrmann, (Taiwan) Chen Yuan-chi, (Singapore) Mardan Mamat
2	22 Nov 2009	Johnnie Walker Cambodian Open	−9 (70-69-73-67=279)	1 stroke	(Malaysia) Shaaban Hussin
3	18 May 2014	ICTSI Philippine Open	−6 (70-66-76-70=282)	2 strokes	(Philippines) Jay Bayron, (Australia) Nathan Holman, (Philippines) Antonio Lascuña, (Bangladesh) Siddikur Rahman, (Thailand) Arnond Vongvanij

Asian Tour playoff record (0–1)

No.	Year	Tournament	Opponent	Result
1	2005	Crowne Plaza Open	(Thailand) Prayad Marksaeng	Lost to birdie on first extra hole

== Team appearances ==
Amateur

- Australian Men's Interstate Teams Matches (representing Victoria): 2000 (winners), 2001, 2002
