= Queen's Cup (golf) =

Tournament information
- Location: Pattaya, Thailand
- Established: 2009
- Course: Phoenix Gold Golf Club
- Par: 72
- Length: 7,386 yards (6,754 m)
- Tour: Asian Tour
- Format: Stroke play
- Prize fund: US$300,000
- Month played: December
- Final year: 2018

Tournament record score
- Aggregate: 260 Miguel Tabuena (2018)
- To par: −20 as above

Final champion
- (Philippines) Miguel Tabuena
- Location in Thailand

The Queen's Cup is a golf tournament on the Asian Tour and is played in Thailand. The inaugural tournament was held in 2009 at the Santiburi Samui Country Club and the prize fund was US$300,000. Chinnarat Phadungsil won the tournament and won $47,550.

The event was played at Santiburi Samui Country Club until 2018. There were two events in 2018. An event was held at Phoenix Gold Golf and Country Club in late June and early July and a second event was held later in the season at the Legacy Golf Club, in late November and early December.

== Winners ==
Year	Winner	Score	To par	Margin of victory	Runner(s)-up
2018 (Dec)	(Philippines) Miguel Tabuena	260	−20	3 strokes	(United States) Johannes Veerman
2018 (Jul)	(Thailand) Jazz Janewattananond	265	−19	4 strokes	(India) Gaganjeet Bhullar
2017	(Malaysia) Nicholas Fung	269	−15	1 stroke	(Thailand) Jazz Janewattananond
2016	(Australia) Scott Hend	269	−15	1 stroke	(Thailand) Gunn Charoenkul
2015	(Thailand) Prayad Marksaeng (2)	270	−14	2 strokes	(Thailand) Thanyakon Khrongpha
2014	(Thailand) Thaworn Wiratchant (2)	272	−12	1 stroke	(Thailand) Poom Saksansin
2013	(Thailand) Prayad Marksaeng	270	−14	3 strokes	(Thailand) Arnond Vongvanij
2012	(Thailand) Thaworn Wiratchant	277	−7	3 strokes	(Philippines) Juvic Pagunsan (Bangladesh) Siddikur Rahman
2011	(Thailand) Chawalit Plaphol	273	−11	2 strokes	(Thailand) Prayad Marksaeng
2010	(Japan) Tetsuji Hiratsuka	273	−11	1 stroke	(Thailand) Thaworn Wiratchant
2009	(Thailand) Chinnarat Phadungsil	268	−16	3 strokes	(Thailand) Udorn Duangdecha (South Korea) Kim Dae-hyun (Japan) Yoshinobu Tsukada
