= Siddikur Rahman =

Bangladeshi professional golfer

Mohammad Siddikur Rahman
Personal information
- Full name: Mohammad Siddikur Rahman
- Nickname: Tiger of Dhaka
- Nationality: Bangladesh
- Born: 20 November 1984 (age 41) Bangladesh
- Height: 5 ft 5 in (1.65 m)
- Weight: 152 lb (69 kg; 10.9 st)

Career
- Sport: Golf
- Turned professional: 2005
- Current tours: Asian Tour; PGTI
- Professional wins: 11

Number of wins by tour
- Asian Tour: 2
- Other: 9

Mohammad Siddikur Rahman (Bengali: মোহম্মদ সিদ্দিকুর রহমান; born 20 November 1984) is a Bangladeshi professional golfer who plays on the Asian Tour.

== Early life and amateur career ==
In 1984, Siddikur Rahman was born in Bangladesh. As an amateur golfer, Siddikur won twelve events in Asia, winning five times in Bangladesh, two in Pakistan, Sri Lanka, and Nepal and one in India.

== Professional career ==
In 2005, Siddikur turned professional. In 2006, he joined the Professional Golf Tour of India. He picked up his first win on tour in 2008 at the PGTI Players Championship at Poona Golf Club and he picked up his second victory two months later at the HUDA-GTPL – Unitech Haryana Open. Siddikur won his third event in 2009 at The Global Green Bangalore Open and his fourth event in 2010 at the American Express Bangladesh Open.

In 2009, Siddikur joined the Asian Tour after finishing in the top 40 at qualifying school. He finished 84th on the Order of Merit for the 2009 season. Siddikur became the first Bangladeshi golfer to win an Asian Tour event at the Brunei Open in August 2010. Siddikur went to a playoff with South African Jbe' Kruger and defeated him on the first extra hole. Kruger missed a 10-foot par putt to extend the playoff.

On 10 July 2016, Siddikur became the first Bangladeshi ever to qualify for the Olympic Games after finishing 56th in the final eligibility list for the Rio 2016 Games; all previous Olympians from Bangladesh had been wild-card selections. He finished the tournament in 58th place.

== Awards and honors ==
In 2013, Rahman was awarded the Bangladesh Sports Journalists Association Sports Person of the Year.

== Professional wins (11) ==
=== Asian Tour wins (2) ===
No.	Date	Tournament	Winning score	Margin of victory	Runner(s)-up
1	1 Aug 2010	Brunei Open	−16 (64-67-70-67=268)	Playoff	(South Africa) Jbe' Kruger
2	10 Nov 2013	Hero Indian Open	−14 (66-66-67-75=274)	1 stroke	(India) Shiv Chawrasia (India) Anirban Lahiri

Asian Tour playoff record (1–2)

No.	Year	Tournament	Opponent	Result
1	2010	Brunei Open	(South Africa) Jbe' Kruger	Won with par on first extra hole
2	2010	Mercuries Taiwan Masters	(Thailand) Pariya Junhasavasdikul	Lost to par on first extra hole
3	2014	SAIL-SBI Open	(India) Rashid Khan	Lost to birdie on first extra hole

=== Asian Development Tour wins (2) ===
No.	Date	Tournament	Winning score	Margin of victory	Runner-up
1	6 Feb 2011	Grameenphone Bangladesh Masters	−19 (66-65-69-69=269)	12 strokes	(Bangladesh) Milon Ahmed
2	27 Jan 2018	City Bank American Express Dhaka Open^{1}	−14 (68-66-70-70=274)	4 strokes	(Sweden) Malcolm Kokocinski

^{1}Co-sanctioned by the Professional Golf Tour of India

=== Professional Golf Tour of India wins (7) ===
No.	Date	Tournament	Winning score	Margin of victory	Runner(s)-up
1	5 Sep 2008	PGTI Players Championship (Poona)	−11 (66-69-67=202)	4 strokes	(India) Yusuf Ali, (India) Gaganjeet Bhullar, (India) Chinnaswamy Muniyappa
2	29 Nov 2008	HUDA-GTPL – Unitech Haryana Open	−5 (73-70-69-71=283)	1 stroke	(India) Vikrant Chopra, (India) Rahul Ganapathy, (India) Chinnaswamy Muniyappa, (India) Ajeetesh Sandhu
3	5 Sep 2009	Global Green Bangalore Open	−8 (71-69-69-71=280)	1 stroke	(India) Ranjit Singh
4	28 Jan 2010	American Express Bangladesh Open	−16 (72-66-65-69=272)	7 strokes	(India) Sujjan Singh
5	2 Apr 2016	BTI Open	−15 (66-70-66-71=273)	Playoff	(Bangladesh) Sajib Ali
6	1 Apr 2017	City Bank American Express Chittagong Open	−16 (69-66-67-70=272)	6 strokes	(India) Sanjeev Kumar
7	27 Jan 2018	City Bank American Express Dhaka Open^{1}	−14 (68-66-70-70=274)	4 strokes	(Sweden) Malcolm Kokocinski

^{1}Co-sanctioned by the Asian Development Tour

=== ASEAN PGA Tour wins (1) ===
No.	Date	Tournament	Winning score	Margin of victory	Runner-up
1	10 Jul 2011	Negeri Sembilan Masters Invitational	−17 (69-68-69-65=271)	4 strokes	(Malaysia) Danny Chia

== Results in World Golf Championships ==
Tournament	2011	2012
Match Play		
Championship		
Invitational		
Champions	T49	76

Did not play

"T" = Tied

== Team appearances ==
Professional

- World Cup (representing Bangladesh): 2013
- EurAsia Cup (representing Asia): 2014

Olympic Games
Preceded by Mahfizur Rahman Sagor	Flagbearer for Bangladesh; Rio de Janeiro 2016	Succeeded by Ariful Islam
