= Thailand Classic (golf) =

Professional golf tournament

Coordinates: 12.614°N 99.892°E

Tournament information
- Location: Bangkok, Thailand
- Established: 2015
- Course: Amata Spring Country Club
- Par: 72
- Length: 7,505 yards (6,863 m)
- Tours: European Tour; Asian Tour
- Format: Stroke play
- Prize fund: US$2,000,000
- Month played: February
- Final year: 2023

Tournament record score
- Aggregate: 264 Thorbjørn Olesen (2023)
- To par: −24 as above

Final champion
- (Denmark) Thorbjørn Olesen
- Location in Thailand

The Thailand Classic was a professional golf tournament that was most recently played on the European Tour. The tournament was created in 2015, as a co-sanctioned event between the Asian Tour and the European Tour.

== History ==
The inaugural tournament was played from 12–15 February 2015 at the Black Mountain Golf Club, in Hua Hin. The tournament was renamed as the True Thailand Classic after the True Corporation had committed to sponsoring the event. It had a purse of US$2,000,000, twice as high as the other leading tournaments in the country, such as the Thailand Golf Championship and Thailand Open.

Andrew Dodt won the inaugural tournament by one stroke over Scott Hend and Thongchai Jaidee. Hend won the following year.

Having not been played since 2016, the tournament was revived in 2023, solely as part of the European Tour schedule. It was played at Amata Spring Country Club.

== Winners ==
| Year | Tour(s) (Note: ASA − Asian Tour; EUR − European Tour.) | Winner | Score | To par | Margin of victory | Runner(s)-up |
Thailand Classic
| 2023 | EUR | (Denmark) Thorbjørn Olesen | 264 | −24 | 4 strokes | (Germany) Yannik Paul |
2017–2022: No tournament
True Thailand Classic
| 2016 | ASA, EUR | (Australia) Scott Hend | 270 | −18 | 1 stroke | (Thailand) Piya Swangarunporn |
| 2015 | ASA, EUR | (Australia) Andrew Dodt | 272 | −16 | 1 stroke | (Australia) Scott Hend (Thailand) Thongchai Jaidee |
