= Andrew Dodt =

Australian professional golfer (born 1986)

Personal information
- Nationality: Australia
- Born: 26 January 1986 (age 40) Gatton, Queensland, Australia

Career
- Sport: Golf
- Turned professional: 2007
- Former tours: European Tour; Asian Tour; PGA Tour of Australasia
- Professional wins: 4

Number of wins by tour
- European Tour: 2
- Asian Tour: 3
- PGA Tour of Australasia: 1

Best results in major championships
- Masters Tournament: DNP
- PGA Championship: DNP
- U.S. Open: DNP
- The Open Championship: T44: 2017

Andrew Dodt (born 26 January 1986) is an Australian professional golfer who plays on the European Tour, Asian Tour, and PGA Tour of Australasia. He has won twice on the European Tour, in India and Thailand, both events co-sanctioned with the Asian Tour.

== Amateur career ==
Dodt was born in Queensland, Australia and learned to play golf from the age of four at Gatton Golf Club, close to where he lived. He was a member of the Golf Australia National Squad and won many high-profile amateur tournaments including the 2007 Australian Amateur Stroke Play. That win gave Dodt a spot in the 2007 MFS Australian Open at The Australian Golf Club in December. He turned professional at the conclusion of that tournament.

== Professional career ==
Dodt joined the Asian Tour for the 2008 season.finished his début season ranked 43rd on the Order of Merit, and improved to 15th in 2009. He won his first professional tournament at the 2010 Avantha Masters, which was co-sanctioned with the European Tour.

In 2015, Dodt won on the European Tour for the first time in five years at the True Thailand Classic, with a one stroke victory over Scott Hend and Thongchai Jaidee. He came from four shots behind in the final round with a five-under-par round to claim the victory. Dodt showed a return to form at the end of 2016, finishing runner-up in the Australian PGA Championship and tied for third in the UBS Hong Kong Open, in successive weeks. In 2017 he had some good results in important events, finishing tied for 6th place in the 2017 BMW PGA Championship and tied for 4th in the Aberdeen Asset Management Scottish Open. His good Scottish Open finish qualified him for the 2017 Open Championship where he finished tied for 44th place. 2018 was a disappointing year; his only top-10 finish being in the Fiji International.

Dodt injured his back in April 2019 and only returned to competitive golf in August at the Sarawak Championship. Dodt won the event after a playoff with Richard T. Lee. Dodt won with a birdie 4 at the first playoff hole. Earlier Lee had tied Dodt with an eagle 3 at the final hole.

== Amateur wins ==
- 2003 Victorian Junior Masters
- 2006 Malaysian Amateur
- 2007 Australian Amateur Stroke Play

== Professional wins (4) ==
=== European Tour wins (2) ===
No.	Date	Tournament	Winning score	Margin of victory	Runner(s)-up
1	14 Feb 2010	Avantha Masters^{1}	−14 (67-68-71-68=274)	1 stroke	(England) Richard Finch
2	15 Feb 2015	True Thailand Classic^{1}	−16 (71-67-67-67=272)	1 stroke	(Australia) Scott Hend, (Thailand) Thongchai Jaidee

^{1}Co-sanctioned by the Asian Tour

=== Asian Tour wins (3) ===
No.	Date	Tournament	Winning score	Margin of victory	Runner(s)-up
1	14 Feb 2010	Avantha Masters^{1}	−14 (67-68-71-68=274)	1 stroke	(England) Richard Finch
2	15 Feb 2015	True Thailand Classic^{1}	−16 (71-67-67-67=272)	1 stroke	(Australia) Scott Hend, (Thailand) Thongchai Jaidee
3	18 Aug 2019	Sarawak Championship	−24 (66-64-70-64=264)	Playoff	(Canada) Richard T. Lee

^{1}Co-sanctioned by the European Tour

Asian Tour playoff record (1–2)

No.	Year	Tournament	Opponent(s)	Result
1	2008	Hana Bank Vietnam Masters	(Wales) Rhys Davies, (Thailand) Thongchai Jaidee	Jaidee won with par on third extra hole Dodt eliminated by birdie on second hole
2	2019	Sarawak Championship	(Canada) Richard T. Lee	Won with birdie on first extra hole
3	2020	Bandar Malaysia Open	(United States) Trevor Simsby, (United States) Jarin Todd	Simsby won with birdie on second extra hole Todd eliminated by birdie on first hole

=== PGA Tour of Australasia wins (1) ===
No.	Date	Tournament	Winning score	Margin of victory	Runner-up
1	31 Aug 2014	Isuzu Queensland Open	−7 (72-70-72-67=281)	2 strokes	(Australia) Tom Bond

== Results in major championships ==
Tournament	2017
The Open Championship	T44

"T" = Tied
Note: Dodt only played in The Open Championship.

== Results in World Golf Championships ==
Results not in chronological order before 2015.

Tournament	2010	2011	2012	2013	2014	2015	2016	2017
Championship								
Match Play								
Invitational						T63		
Champions	T53					T68		75

Did not play

"T" = Tied

== Team appearances ==
Amateur

- Nomura Cup (representing Australia): 2005 (winners), 2007 (winners)
- Bonallack Trophy (representing Asia/Pacific): 2006
- Sloan Morpeth Trophy (representing Australia): 2007
- Australian Men's Interstate Teams Matches (representing Queensland): 2003, 2004 (winners), 2005, 2006, 2007

== See also ==
- 2014 European Tour Qualifying School graduates
