= Pariya Junhasavasdikul =

Thai professional golfer

Personal information
- Nationality: Thailand
- Born: 14 August 1984 (age 42)

Career
- Sport: Golf
- College: Purdue University
- Turned professional: 2008
- Current tour: Asian Tour
- Professional wins: 4

Number of wins by tour
- Asian Tour: 2
- Other: 2

Pariya Junhasavasdikul (born 14 August 1984) is a Thai professional golfer.

== Career ==
Junhasavasdikul played college golf at Purdue University (where he majored in business management) in the United States.

Junhasavasdikul turned professional in 2008 and plays on the Asian Tour. He won the 2010 Mercuries Taiwan Masters and the 2013 Worldwide Holdings Selangor Masters.

== Professional wins (4) ==
=== Asian Tour wins (2) ===
No.	Date	Tournament	Winning score	Margin of victory	Runner-up
1	3 Oct 2010	Mercuries Taiwan Masters	−2 (71-71-70-74=286)	Playoff	(Bangladesh) Siddikur Rahman
2	23 Jun 2013	Worldwide Holdings Selangor Masters	−9 (66-68-71-70=275)	1 stroke	(India) Anirban Lahiri

Asian Tour playoff record (1–0)

No.	Year	Tournament	Opponent	Result
1	2010	Mercuries Taiwan Masters	(Bangladesh) Siddikur Rahman	Won with par on first extra hole

=== Professional Golf Tour of India wins (1) ===
No.	Date	Tournament	Winning score	Margin of victory	Runner-up
1	25 Dec 2016	McLeod Russel Tour Championship	−15 (66-68-68-71=273)	3 strokes	(India) Rashid Khan

=== ASEAN PGA Tour wins (1) ===
No.	Date	Tournament	Winning score	Margin of victory	Runner-up
1	8 Nov 2008	Mercedes-Benz Masters Singapore	−11 (68-67-73-69=277)	2 strokes	(Singapore) Lam Chih Bing

== Results in World Golf Championships ==
Tournament	2010
Match Play	
Championship	
Invitational	
Champions	T67

Did not play

"T" = Tied
