= Rashid Khan (golfer) =

Indian professional golfer (born 1991)

Personal information
- Nationality: India
- Born: 15 February 1991 (age 35)
- Height: 5 ft 11 in (1.80 m)

Career
- Sport: Golf
- Turned professional: 2010
- Current tours: Asian Tour; Professional Golf Tour of India
- Professional wins: 14

Number of wins by tour
- Asian Tour: 2
- Other: 12

Achievements and awards
- Professional Golf Tour of India Order of Merit winner: 2013, 2016, 2019
Medal record
Asian Games
Silver medal – second place	2010 Guangzhou	Men's team

Rashid Khan (born 15 February 1991) is an Indian professional golfer.

== Career ==
As an amateur, Khan played on the Indian team that won the silver medal at the 2010 Asian Games.

Khan turned professional later that year and has played on the Professional Golf Tour of India (PGTI) since 2011. He finished third on the Order of Merit (money list) in 2011, second in 2012, and first in 2013. He has won four times on the PGTI.

Khan began playing on the Asian Tour in 2012. He had two top-10 finishes in five events in 2013 and won his first event of the 2014 season at the SAIL-SBI Open.

== Professional wins (14) ==
=== Asian Tour wins (2) ===
No.	Date	Tournament	Winning score	Margin of victory	Runner(s)-up
1	1 Mar 2014	SAIL-SBI Open^{1}	−18 (61-69-69-71=270)	Playoff	(Bangladesh) Siddikur Rahman
2	16 Nov 2014	Chiangmai Golf Classic	−17 (68-69-66-68=271)	1 stroke	(Thailand) Thanyakon Khrongpha, (India) Jyoti Randhawa

^{1}Co-sanctioned by the Professional Golf Tour of India

Asian Tour playoff record (1–2)

No.	Year	Tournament	Opponent	Result
1	2013	SAIL-SBI Open	(India) Anirban Lahiri	Lost to birdie on first extra hole
2	2014	SAIL-SBI Open	(Bangladesh) Siddikur Rahman	Won with birdie on first extra hole
3	2022	Mercuries Taiwan Masters	(Taiwan) Chan Shih-chang	Lost to birdie on second extra hole

=== Professional Golf Tour of India wins (12) ===
No.	Date	Tournament	Winning score	Margin of victory	Runner(s)-up
1	17 Apr 2011	Surya Nepal Masters	−20 (65-67-70-66=268)	7 strokes	(Sri Lanka) Mithun Perera
2	25 Aug 2012	PGTI Players Championship (Coimbatore)	−6 (70-67-70-75=282)	Playoff	(India) Vikrant Chopra
3	12 Apr 2013	PGTI Players Championship (Classic II)	159 pts (40-40-40-39=159)	2 points	(India) Gurbaaz Mann
4	26 Oct 2013	BILT Open	−16 (64-68-69-71=272)	Playoff	(India) Angad Cheema
5	1 Mar 2014	SAIL-SBI Open^{1}	−18 (61-69-69-71=270)	Playoff	(Bangladesh) Siddikur Rahman
6	3 Oct 2014	Eagleburg Masters	−19 (68-67-65-69=269)	2 strokes	(India) Chinnaswamy Muniyappa
7	6 Aug 2016	TAKE Solutions Classic	−10 (71-69-68-70=278)	2 strokes	(India) Amardeep Malik, (India) Chinnaswamy Muniyappa
8	16 Sep 2016	Ahmedabad Masters	−12 (67-69-71-69=276)	1 stroke	(India) Khalin Joshi
9	15 Dec 2018	CG Open	−16 (68-62-71-63=264)	4 strokes	(India) Shamim Khan
10	9 Mar 2019	City Bank American Express Chittagong Open	−24 (65-66-70-63=264)	7 strokes	(India) Kshitij Naveed Kaul
11	17 May 2019	Tata Steel PGTI Players Championship (Chandigarh)	−13 (70-68-71-66=275)	2 strokes	(India) Shankar Das, (India) Gaurav Pratap Singh
12	28 Aug 2026	Telangana Open	−23 (66-67-65-67=265)	3 strokes	(India) Honey Baisoya

^{1}Co-sanctioned by the Asian Tour

=== Other wins (1) ===
- 2019 Tata Steel PGTI Feeder Tour

== Team appearances ==
Amateur

- Eisenhower Trophy (representing India): 2008, 2010
