= Steve Lewton =

English golfer

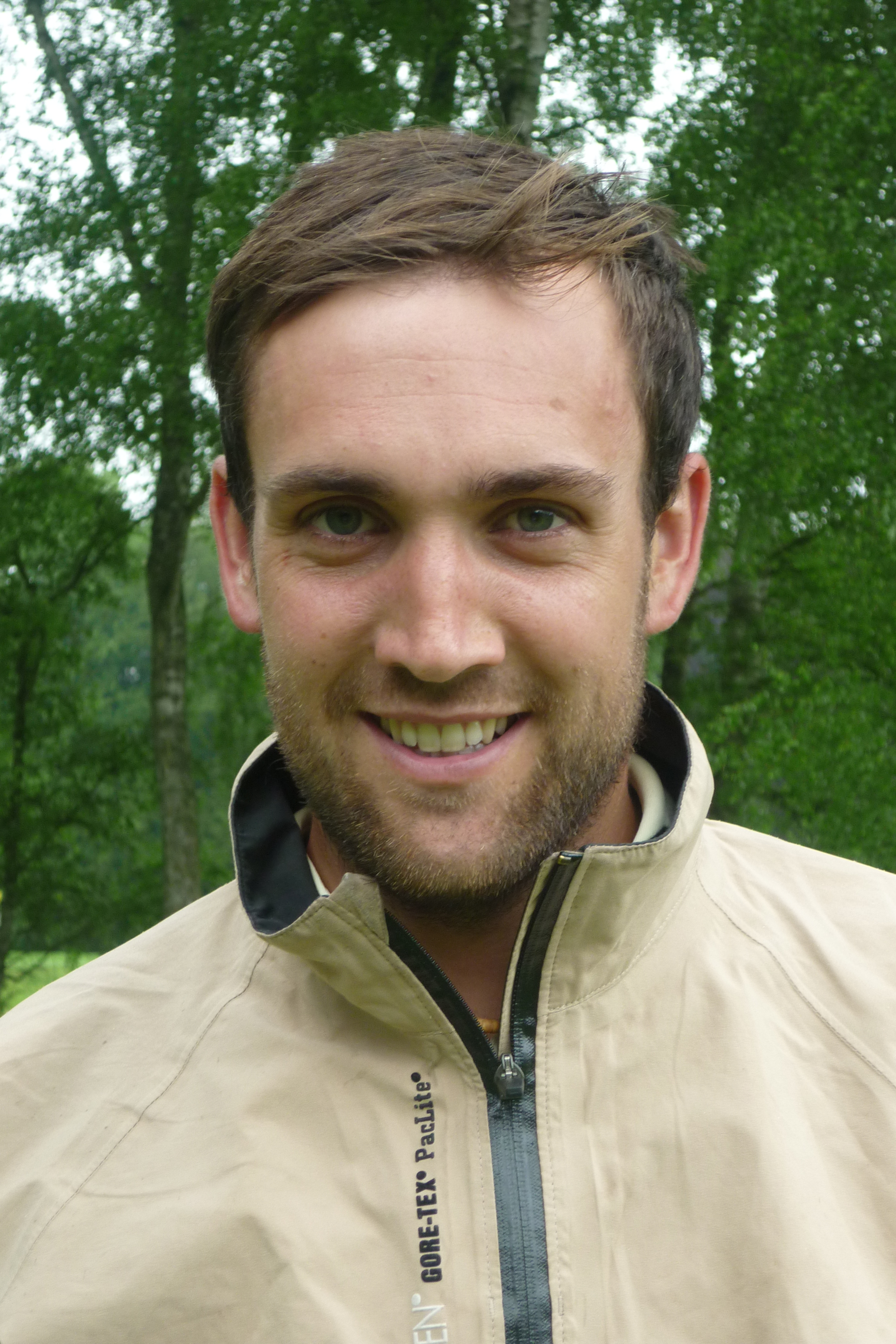

Personal information
- Full name: Stephen Michael Lewton
- Nationality: England
- Born: 5 May 1983 (age 43) Northampton, Northamptonshire, England
- Height: 1.91 m (6 ft 3 in)
- Weight: 83 kg (183 lb; 13.1 st)

Career
- Sport: Golf
- College: North Carolina State University
- Turned professional: 2008
- Current tour: Asian Tour
- Former tours: European Tour; Korn Ferry Tour; Challenge Tour; PGA Tour China; Asian Development Tour; Alps Tour
- Professional wins: 7

Number of wins by tour
- Asian Tour: 2
- Other: 5

Stephen Michael Lewton (born 5 May 1983) is an English professional golfer who plays primarily in Asia. He won the 2014 Mercuries Taiwan Masters on the Asian Tour.

== Amateur career ==
Lewton played college golf in the United States at North Carolina State University from 2002 to 2006, winning twice. He was runner-up in the 2006 European Amateur behind Rory McIlroy.

== Professional career ==
Lewton turned professional in 2008. In 2010 he joined the Challenge Tour, finishing 80th in the season-end standings with a best result of T5. That winter he came through the qualifying school to secure a place on the European Tour; however after a difficult debut season he failed to retain his playing card.

For the 2012 season, he opted to take a place on the Asian Tour after earning his card in qualifying school. He played primarily on the Asian Tour from 2012 to 2017. His best season was 2014 when he won the Mercuries Taiwan Masters and finished tied for 4th place in the Solaire Open.

== Amateur wins ==
- 2006 Seminole Intercollegiate, Cavalier Classic
- 2007 New South Wales Medal

== Professional wins (7) ==
=== Asian Tour wins (2) ===
No.	Date	Tournament	Winning score	Margin of victory	Runners-up
1	5 Oct 2014	Mercuries Taiwan Masters	−5 (70-72-70-71=283)	2 strokes	(Brazil) Adilson da Silva, (Philippines) Antonio Lascuña
2	1 Sep 2024	Mandiri Indonesia Open	−16 (67-67-66-68=268)	Playoff	(Australia) Aaron Wilkin, (China) Sampson Zheng

Asian Tour playoff record (1–0)

No.	Year	Tournament	Opponents	Result
1	2024	Mandiri Indonesia Open	(Australia) Aaron Wilkin, (China) Sampson Zheng	Won with birdie on second extra hole

=== Philippine Golf Tour wins (1) ===
No.	Date	Tournament	Winning score	Margin of victory	Runner-up
1	5 Mar 2017	Solaire Philippine Open	−1 (70-71-71-75=287)	Playoff	(United States) Johannes Veerman

=== Jamega Pro Golf Tour wins (4) ===
No.	Date	Tournament	Winning score	Margin of victory	Runner(s)-up
1	20 May 2013	The Vale - International Course	−11 (68-69=137)	3 strokes	(England) Gary King
2	23 Jul 2013	Aldwickbury Park	−8 (64-70=134)	3 strokes	(England) Roberto Laino
3	15 Jul 2014	The Shire	−12 (65-65=130)	9 strokes	(England) Blane Breheny, (England) Craig Hinton
4	1 Sep 2021	Springs Club Classic	−7 (68-69=137)	2 strokes	(England) Jack Duguid, (England) Thomas Spreadborough

== Team appearances ==
Amateur

- Palmer Cup (representing Europe): 2006 (winners)

== See also ==
- 2010 European Tour Qualifying School graduates
