= Resorts World Manila Masters =

Defunct golf tournament on the Asian Tour

Tournament information
- Location: Manila, Philippines
- Established: 2013
- Courses: Manila Southwoods Golf and Country Club (Masters Course)
- Par: 72
- Length: 7,317 yards (6,691 m)
- Tour: Asian Tour
- Format: Stroke play
- Prize fund: US$1,000,000
- Month played: November
- Final year: 2017

Tournament record score
- Aggregate: 268 Mardan Mamat (2014)
- To par: −20 as above

Final champion
- (United States) Micah Lauren Shin
- Location in the Philippines

The Resorts World Manila Masters was a golf tournament on the Asian Tour. It was played for the first time in November 2013 at the Manila Southwoods Golf and Country Club in Manila, Philippines. In 2017, the event became the flagship event of the Asian Tour, with a minimum twenty Official World Golf Ranking points to the winner, compared to 14 for most Asian Tour events.

== Winners ==
Year	Winner	Score	To par	Margin of victory	Runner(s)-up	Purse ($)
2017	(United States) Micah Lauren Shin	269	−19	Playoff	(Thailand) Arnond Vongvanij	1,000,000
2016	(India) Shiv Chawrasia	269	−19	Playoff	(United States) Sam Chien (Malaysia) Nicholas Fung	1,000,000
2015	(Thailand) Natipong Srithong	273	−15	1 stroke	(South Africa) Jbe' Kruger	1,000,000
2014	(Singapore) Mardan Mamat	268	−20	6 strokes	(France) Lionel Weber	1,000,000
2013	(China) Liang Wenchong	272	−16	Playoff	(Thailand) Prom Meesawat	750,000
