= SAIL-SBI Open =

Golf tournament

Tournament information
- Location: India
- Established: 2008
- Course: Delhi Golf Club
- Par: 72
- Length: 6,935 yards (6,341 m)
- Tours: Asian Tour; Professional Golf Tour of India
- Format: Stroke play
- Prize fund: US$300,000
- Month played: February/March
- Final year: 2014

Tournament record score
- Aggregate: 256 Chapchai Nirat (2009)
- To par: −32 as above

Final champion
- (India) Rashid Khan
- Location in India Location in Delhi

The SAIL-SBI Open was a golf tournament on the Asian Tour, played in India between 2008 and 2014. It was co-sanctioned by the Professional Golf Tour of India. The title sponsors were Steel Authority of India Limited (SAIL) and State Bank of India (SBI).

The inaugural tournament was played at Jaypee Greens Golf Resort in Greater Noida, before moving to the Jack Nicklaus designed Signature Course at Classic Golf Resort, just outside Gurgaon, near New Delhi in 2009. Since 2010, the tournament has been played at the Delhi Golf Club.

In 2009, Chapchai Nirat, set a new Asian Tour scoring record when he captured the title with a 32-under-par aggregate of 256.

== Winners ==
Year	Tour(s) (Note: ASA − Asian Tour; PGTI − Professional Golf Tour of India.)	Winner	Score	To par	Margin of victory	Runner(s)-up	Venue
SAIL-SBI Open
2014	ASA, PGTI	(India) Rashid Khan	270	−18	Playoff	(Bangladesh) Siddikur Rahman	Delhi
2013	ASA, PGTI	(India) Anirban Lahiri (2)	273	−15	Playoff	(India) Rashid Khan	Delhi
2012	ASA, PGTI	(India) Anirban Lahiri	274	−14	Playoff	(Thailand) Prom Meesawat	Delhi
SAIL Open
2011	ASA	(Thailand) Kiradech Aphibarnrat	272	−16	1 stroke	(Bangladesh) Siddikur Rahman	Delhi
2010	ASA	(Sweden) Rikard Karlberg	268	−20	5 strokes	(India) Shiv Kapur	Delhi
2009	ASA	(Thailand) Chapchai Nirat	256	−32	11 strokes	(India) Gaganjeet Bhullar (Australia) Richard Moir	Classic
SAIL Open Golf Championship
2008	ASA	(New Zealand) Mark Brown	274	−14	4 strokes	(Australia) Scott Hend (South Korea) Noh Seung-yul (India) Jyoti Randhawa	Jaypee Greens
