= 2014 Professional Golf Tour of India =

Golf tour season

2014 Professional Golf Tour of India season
- Duration: 29 January 2014 – 28 December 2014
- Number of official events: 20
- Most wins: (India) S. Chikkarangappa (4)
- Order of Merit: (India) Shankar Das

The 2014 Professional Golf Tour of India was the eighth season of the Professional Golf Tour of India, the main professional golf tour in India since it was formed in 2006.

== Schedule ==
The following table lists official events during the 2014 season.

Date	Tournament	Location	Purse (₹)	Winner (Note: The number in brackets after each winner's name is the number of Professional Golf Tour of India events they had won up to and including that tournament.)	OWGR points	Other tours (Note: ADT − Asian Development Tour; ASA − Asian Tour.)
1 Feb	Ahmedabad Masters	Gujarat	5,000,000	(India) Anirban Lahiri (14)	n/a	
9 Feb	Standard Chartered Open	Sri Lanka	US$50,000	(Sri Lanka) Mithun Perera (4)	n/a	
15 Feb	Eagleburg Open	Karnataka	3,000,000	(Sri Lanka) Mithun Perera (5)	n/a	
1 Mar	SAIL-SBI Open	Delhi	US$300,000	(India) Rashid Khan (5)	14	ASA
5 Apr	PGTI Players Championship (Coimbatore)	Tamil Nadu	3,000,000	(Sri Lanka) K. Prabagaran (1)	n/a	
12 Apr	Cochin Masters	Kerala	5,000,000	(India) Shubhankar Sharma (1)	n/a	
26 Apr	Surya Nepal Masters	Nepal	3,000,000	(India) S. Chikkarangappa (2)	n/a	
5 Jul	J&K Bank Pahalgam Masters	Jammu and Kashmir	3,000,000	(India) Om Prakash Chouhan (3)	n/a	
12 Jul	Kashmir Masters	Jammu and Kashmir	5,000,000	(India) S. Chikkarangappa (3)	n/a	
3 Oct	Eagleburg Masters	Karnataka	5,000,000	(India) Rashid Khan (6)	n/a	
10 Oct	BILT Open	Delhi	10,000,000	(Sri Lanka) Anura Rohana (3)	n/a	
17 Oct	PGTI Players Championship (Noida)	Uttar Pradesh	3,000,000	(India) Khalin Joshi (1)	n/a	
1 Nov	TAKE Solutions India Masters	Karnataka	US$70,000	(India) S. Chikkarangappa (4)	6	ADT
9 Nov	Panasonic Open India	Delhi	US$300,000	(India) Shiv Chawrasia (4)	14	ASA
15 Nov	Chief Minister's Meghalaya Open Golf	Meghalaya	4,000,000	(India) Sanjay Kumar (2)	n/a	
22 Nov	IndianOil Servo Masters Golf	Assam	3,000,000	(India) Shamim Khan (8)	n/a	
6 Dec	CG Open	Maharashtra	10,000,000	(India) S. Chikkarangappa (5)	n/a	
12 Dec	Noida Masters	Uttar Pradesh	4,000,000	(India) Amardip Sinh Malik (1)	n/a	
21 Dec	Tata Open	Jharkhand	7,500,000	(India) Om Prakash Chouhan (4)	n/a	
28 Dec	McLeod Russel Tour Championship	West Bengal	15,000,000	(India) Shankar Das (5)	n/a	

== Order of Merit ==
The Order of Merit was titled as the Rolex Rankings and was based on prize money won during the season, calculated in Indian rupees.

Position	Player	Prize money (₹)
1	(India) Shankar Das	5,432,067
2	(India) S. Chikkarangappa	4,715,336
3	(India) Om Prakash Chouhan	4,293,750
4	(India) Rashid Khan	2,983,050
5	(India) Mukesh Kumar	2,682,728
