= Chiangmai Golf Classic =

Golf tournament in Thailand

Tournament information
- Location: Chiang Mai, Thailand
- Established: 2013
- Course: Alpine Golf Resort
- Par: 72
- Length: 7,471 yards (6,831 m)
- Tour: Asian Tour
- Format: Stroke play
- Prize fund: US$750,000
- Month played: November
- Final year: 2014

Tournament record score
- Aggregate: 268 Scott Hend (2013)
- To par: −20 as above

Final champion
- (India) Rashid Khan
- Location in Thailand

The Chiangmai Golf Classic was a golf tournament on the Asian Tour. It was first played in 2013 at the Alpine Golf Resort-Chiangmai in Chiang Mai, Thailand.

== Winners ==
Year	Winner	Score	To par	Margin of victory	Runner(s)-up
2014	(India) Rashid Khan	271	−17	1 stroke	(Thailand) Thanyakon Khrongpha (India) Jyoti Randhawa
2013	(Australia) Scott Hend	268	−20	3 strokes	(South Africa) Bryce Easton
