= 2012 Asian Tour =

Golf tour season

2012 Asian Tour season
- Duration: 2 February 2012 – 16 December 2012
- Number of official events: 26
- Most wins: (Thailand) Thaworn Wiratchant (3)
- Order of Merit: (Thailand) Thaworn Wiratchant
- Players' Player of the Year: (Thailand) Thaworn Wiratchant
- Rookie of the Year: (Japan) Masanori Kobayashi

The 2012 Asian Tour was the 18th season of the modern Asian Tour (formerly the Asian PGA Tour), the main professional golf tour in Asia (outside of Japan) since it was established in 1995.

== Schedule ==
The following table lists official events during the 2012 season.

Date	Tournament	Host country	Purse (US$)	Winner (Note: The number in brackets after each winner's name is the number of Asian Tour events they had won up to and including that tournament. This information is only shown for Asian Tour members.)	OWGR points	Other tours (Note: EUR − European Tour; JPN − Japan Golf Tour; KOR − Korean Tour; PGAT − PGA Tour; PGTI − Professional Golf Tour of India.)	Notes
5 Feb	Zaykabar Myanmar Open	Myanmar	300,000	(Australia) Kieran Pratt (1)	14		
12 Feb	ICTSI Philippine Open	Philippines	300,000	(Singapore) Mardan Mamat (3)	14		
19 Feb	Avantha Masters	India	€1,800,000	(South Africa) Jbe' Kruger (1)	20	EUR	
25 Feb	SAIL-SBI Open	India	300,000	(India) Anirban Lahiri (2)	14	PGTI	
17 Mar	Handa Faldo Cambodian Classic	Cambodia	300,000	(United States) David Lipsky (1)	14		New tournament
1 Apr	Panasonic Open India	India	300,000	(India) Digvijay Singh (1)	14	PGTI	
8 Apr	ISPS Handa Singapore Classic	Singapore	400,000	(Australia) Scott Hend (2)	14		
15 Apr	Maybank Malaysian Open	Malaysia	2,500,000	(South Africa) Louis Oosthuizen (1)	36	EUR	
22 Apr	CIMB Niaga Indonesian Masters	Indonesia	750,000	(England) Lee Westwood (n/a)	20		
29 Apr	Ballantine's Championship	South Korea	€2,205,000	(Austria) Bernd Wiesberger (n/a)	32	EUR, KOR	
17 Jun	Queen's Cup	Thailand	300,000	(Thailand) Thaworn Wiratchant (13)	14		
24 Jun	Volvik Hildesheim Open	South Korea	300,000	(South Korea) Lee In-woo (1)	14	KOR	New tournament
2 Sep	Omega European Masters	Switzerland	€2,100,000	(Scotland) Richie Ramsay (n/a)	32	EUR	
8 Sep	Worldwide Holdings Selangor Masters	Malaysia	RM1,200,000	(Thailand) Thaworn Wiratchant (14)	14		
16 Sep	Yeangder Tournament Players Championship	Taiwan	500,000	(India) Gaganjeet Bhullar (3)	14		
23 Sep	Asia-Pacific Panasonic Open	Japan	¥150,000,000	(Japan) Masanori Kobayashi (1)	20	JPN	
30 Sep	Mercuries Taiwan Masters	Taiwan	600,000	(Taiwan) Tsai Chi-huang (2)	14		
7 Oct	CJ Invitational	South Korea	750,000	(South Korea) K. J. Choi (6)	14	KOR	
14 Oct	Venetian Macau Open	Macau	750,000	(India) Gaganjeet Bhullar (4)	14		
21 Oct	Hero Indian Open	India	1,250,000	(Thailand) Thaworn Wiratchant (15)	14		
28 Oct	CIMB Classic	Malaysia	6,100,000	(United States) Nick Watney (n/a)	36	PGAT (Note: PGA Tour unofficial event)	Limited-field event
11 Nov	Barclays Singapore Open	Singapore	6,000,000	(Italy) Matteo Manassero (n/a)	48	EUR	
18 Nov	UBS Hong Kong Open	Hong Kong	2,750,000	(Spain) Miguel Ángel Jiménez (n/a)	32	EUR	
2 Dec	King's Cup	Thailand	500,000	(Thailand) Arnond Vongvanij (1)	14		
9 Dec	Thailand Golf Championship	Thailand	1,000,000	(South Africa) Charl Schwartzel (n/a)	36		Flagship event
16 Dec	Iskandar Johor Open	Malaysia	2,000,000	(Spain) Sergio García (2)	20		

== Order of Merit ==
The Order of Merit was based on prize money won during the season, calculated in U.S. dollars.

Position	Player	Prize money ($)
1	(Thailand) Thaworn Wiratchant	738,047
2	(Australia) Marcus Fraser	672,745
3	(South Africa) Jbe' Kruger	474,989
4	(Japan) Masanori Kobayashi	471,080
5	(India) Gaganjeet Bhullar	451,245

== Awards ==
Award	Winner	Ref.
Players' Player of the Year	(Thailand) Thaworn Wiratchant	
Rookie of the Year	(Japan) Masanori Kobayashi	

== See also ==
- 2012 Asian Development Tour
