= 2016 Professional Golf Tour of India =

Golf tour season

2016 Professional Golf Tour of India season
- Duration: 10 February 2016 – 25 December 2016
- Number of official events: 21
- Most wins: (India) S. Chikkarangappa (3) (India) Shubhankar Sharma (3)
- Order of Merit: (India) Rashid Khan

The 2016 Professional Golf Tour of India was the 10th season of the Professional Golf Tour of India, the main professional golf tour in India since it was formed in 2006.

== Schedule ==
The following table lists official events during the 2016 season.

Date	Tournament	Location	Purse (₹)	Winner (Note: The number in brackets after each winner's name is the number of Professional Golf Tour of India events they had won up to and including that tournament.)	OWGR points	Other tours (Note: ASA − Asian Tour.)
13 Feb	CIAL Cochin Masters	Kerala	6,000,000	(India) Feroz Ali Mollah (2)	n/a	
19 Feb	PGTI Players Championship (Eagleton)	Karnataka	3,000,000	(India) Shubhankar Sharma (2)	n/a	
28 Feb	Golconda Masters	Telangana	4,000,000	(India) Ajeetesh Sandhu (2)	n/a	
25 Mar	Kolkata Classic	West Bengal	3,000,000	(India) Shubhankar Sharma (3)	n/a	
2 Apr	BTI Open	Bangladesh	3,500,000	(Bangladesh) Siddikur Rahman (5)	n/a	
8 Apr	Pune Open	Maharashtra	3,000,000	(India) Harendra Gupta (5)	n/a	
4 Jun	Louis Philippe Cup	Karnataka	12,000,000	(India) S. Chikkarangappa (9)	n/a	
6 Aug	TAKE Solutions Classic	Uttar Pradesh	5,000,000	(India) Rashid Khan (7)	n/a	
12 Aug	PGTI Players Championship (Classic)	Haryana	3,000,000	(India) Khalin Joshi (3)	n/a	
9 Sep	Eagleburg Masters	Karnataka	3,000,000	(India) S. Chikkarangappa (10)	n/a	
16 Sep	Ahmedabad Masters	Gujarat	3,000,000	(India) Rashid Khan (8)	n/a	
7 Oct	PGTI Masters	Haryana	5,000,000	(India) Ashok Kumar (13)	n/a	
14 Oct	Chennai Open Golf Championship	Tamil Nadu	4,000,000	(India) Mukesh Kumar (18)	n/a	
22 Oct	TAKE Open Golf Championship	Karnataka	10,000,000	(India) S. Chikkarangappa (11)	n/a	
4 Nov	PGTI Players Championship (Tollygunge)	West Bengal	3,000,000	(India) Karandeep Kochhar (1)	n/a	
13 Nov	Chief Ministers Meghalaya Open Golf	Meghalaya	4,000,000	(India) Honey Baisoya (1)	n/a	
19 Nov	IndianOil Servo Masters Golf	Assam	3,500,000	(India) Honey Baisoya (2)	n/a	
26 Nov	CG Open	Maharashtra	10,000,000	(India) Shamim Khan (10)	n/a	
4 Dec	Panasonic Open India	Delhi	US$400,000	(India) Mukesh Kumar (19)	14	ASA
18 Dec	Tata Open	Jharkhand	7,500,000	(India) Shubhankar Sharma (4)	n/a	
25 Dec	McLeod Russel Tour Championship	West Bengal	15,000,000	(Thailand) Pariya Junhasavasdikul (n/a)	n/a	

== Order of Merit ==
The Order of Merit was titled as the Rolex Rankings and was based on prize money won during the season, calculated in Indian rupees.

Position	Player	Prize money (₹)
1	(India) Rashid Khan	4,479,880
2	(India) Shamim Khan	4,116,458
3	(India) Shubhankar Sharma	3,921,598
4	(India) Khalin Joshi	3,578,965
5	(India) Honey Baisoya	2,733,720
