= Brunei Open =

Tournament information
- Location: Brunei
- Established: 2005
- Courses: Empire Hotel and Country Club
- Par: 71
- Length: 7,070 yards (6,460 m)
- Tour: Asian Tour
- Format: Stroke play
- Prize fund: US$300,000
- Month played: August
- Final year: 2010

Tournament record score
- Aggregate: 265 Terry Pilkadaris (2005)
- To par: −19 as above

Final champion
- (Bangladesh) Siddikur Rahman
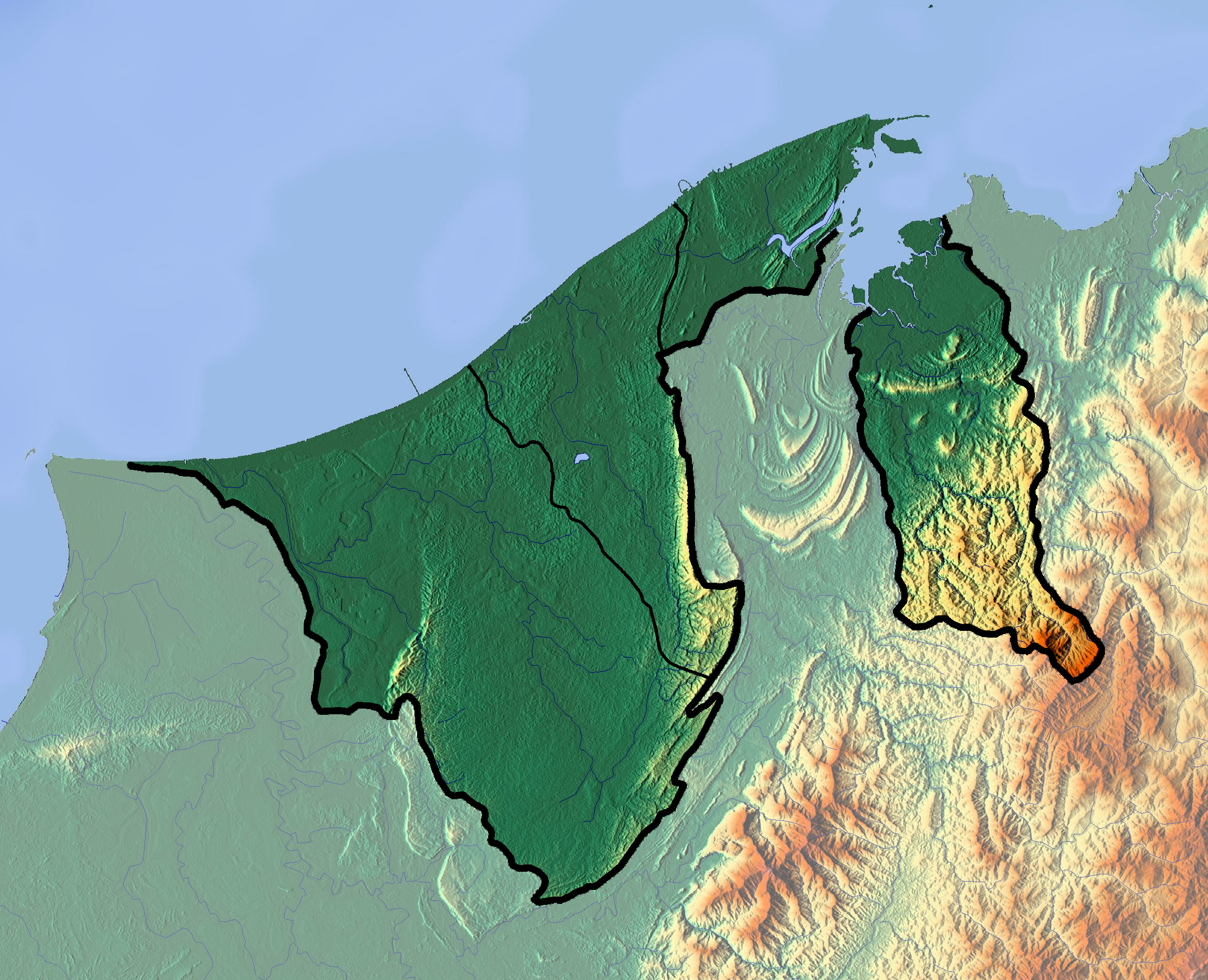
- Location in Brunei

The Brunei Open was an Asian Tour golf tournament. The 2005 staging was Brunei's first ever professional golf tournament, and it was won by Terry Pilkadaris of Australia. The event was held at the Jack Nicklaus-designed course at the Empire Hotel and Country Club. In 2010, the prize fund was US$300,000.

== Winners ==
| Year | Winner | Score | To par | Margin of victory | Runner(s)-up | Ref |
|---|---|---|---|---|---|---|
| 2010 | (Bangladesh) Siddikur Rahman | 268 | −16 | Playoff | (South Africa) Jbe' Kruger | |
| 2009 | (Australia) Darren Beck | 271 | −13 | Playoff | (India) Gaganjeet Bhullar (Thailand) Boonchu Ruangkit | |
| 2008 | (Australia) Rick Kulacz | 271 | −13 | Playoff | (Taiwan) Lu Wen-teh | |
| 2007 | (Taiwan) Lin Wen-tang | 269 | −15 | 2 strokes | (Australia) Adam Le Vesconte | |
| 2006 | (Taiwan) Wang Ter-chang | 268 | −16 | Playoff | (Australia) David Gleeson | |
| 2005 | (Australia) Terry Pilkadaris | 265 | −19 | 5 strokes | (Australia) Jarrod Lyle | |

== See also ==
- Open golf tournament
