= Kuala Lumpur Golf & Country Club =

Golf and country club in Kuala Lumpur, Malaysia

Coordinates: 3.139°N 101.640°E

Kuala Lumpur Golf & Country Club (KLGCC)
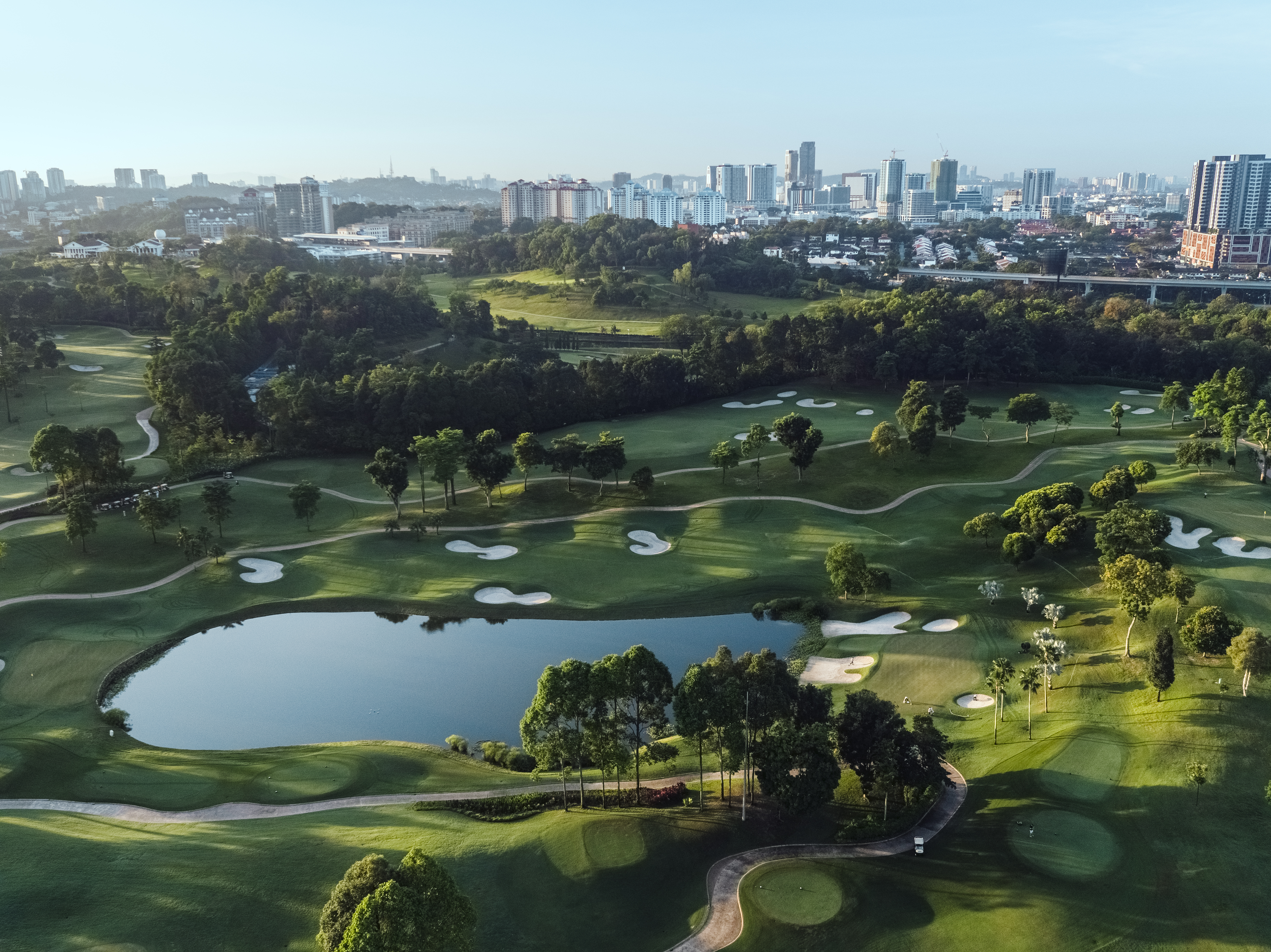
- Kuala Lumpur Golf & Country Club
- Interactive map of Kuala Lumpur Golf & Country Club (KLGCC)

Club information
- Location: Bukit Kiara, Malaysia
- Established: 1991
- Type: Private
- Owner: Sime Darby Property
- Tota holes: 36
- Tournaments: Maybank Malaysian Open (2006, 2010–2015); Sime Darby LPGA Malaysia (2010–2017); CIMB Classic (2013–2018); Malaysian Open (2016–2017)
- Website: www.klgcc.com

East Course
- Par: 71

West Course
- Par: 72
- Course record: 61 Justin Thomas (2015), Gary Woodland (2018)

Kuala Lumpur Golf & Country Club (KLGCC), formerly known as Tournament Players Club or TPC Kuala Lumpur, is a golf club located in Bukit Kiara which borders affluent neighbourhoods including Taman Tun Dr Ismail, Hartamas, and Bukit Damansara. Many of its facilities are open to visitors, including the golf course, driving range, all six F&B venues, bowling centre, workout classes, proshop and golf academy.

The club became part of the TPC network of golf courses on 24 August 2016.

The club adheres to the standards set by the PGA TOUR, LPGA and TPC Network of golf clubs.

== History ==
The land for the construction of the club was acquired in 1991 by Solarvest Sdn Bhd, a subsidiary of Lum Chang, a Singapore-based construction company. The club itself was developed by Kuala Lumpur Golf and Country Club Sdn Bhd, also owned by Solarvest, and is leased for 96 years. The total cost of the project was RM 430 million, including the RM 20 million for the lease. The club was already under construction by 1994 but the lease period was cut to 60 years.

== Golf Courses ==
Originally opened in 1991, TPC Kuala Lumpur's two 18-hole championship golf courses, the Par 71 East and Par 72 West Courses had since undergone a total redesign. The revamped West Course reopened in 2009 and the East Course in 2010. TPC Kuala Lumpur's West Course completed another upgrade in August 2018. By end of 2018, seven Malaysian Opens and five CIMB Classic tournaments were held on TPC Kuala Lumpur's West Course.

== International tournaments ==
TPC Kuala Lumpur has hosted several international championships, including the Sime Darby LPGA Malaysia on its East Course, and the CIMB Classic and Maybank Malaysian Open on the West Course. TPC Kuala Lumpur also played host for two women's international tennis tournaments: the 2016 BMW Malaysian Open and the 2017 ALYA WTA Malaysian Open.
