= Anirban Lahiri =

Indian professional golfer (born 1987)

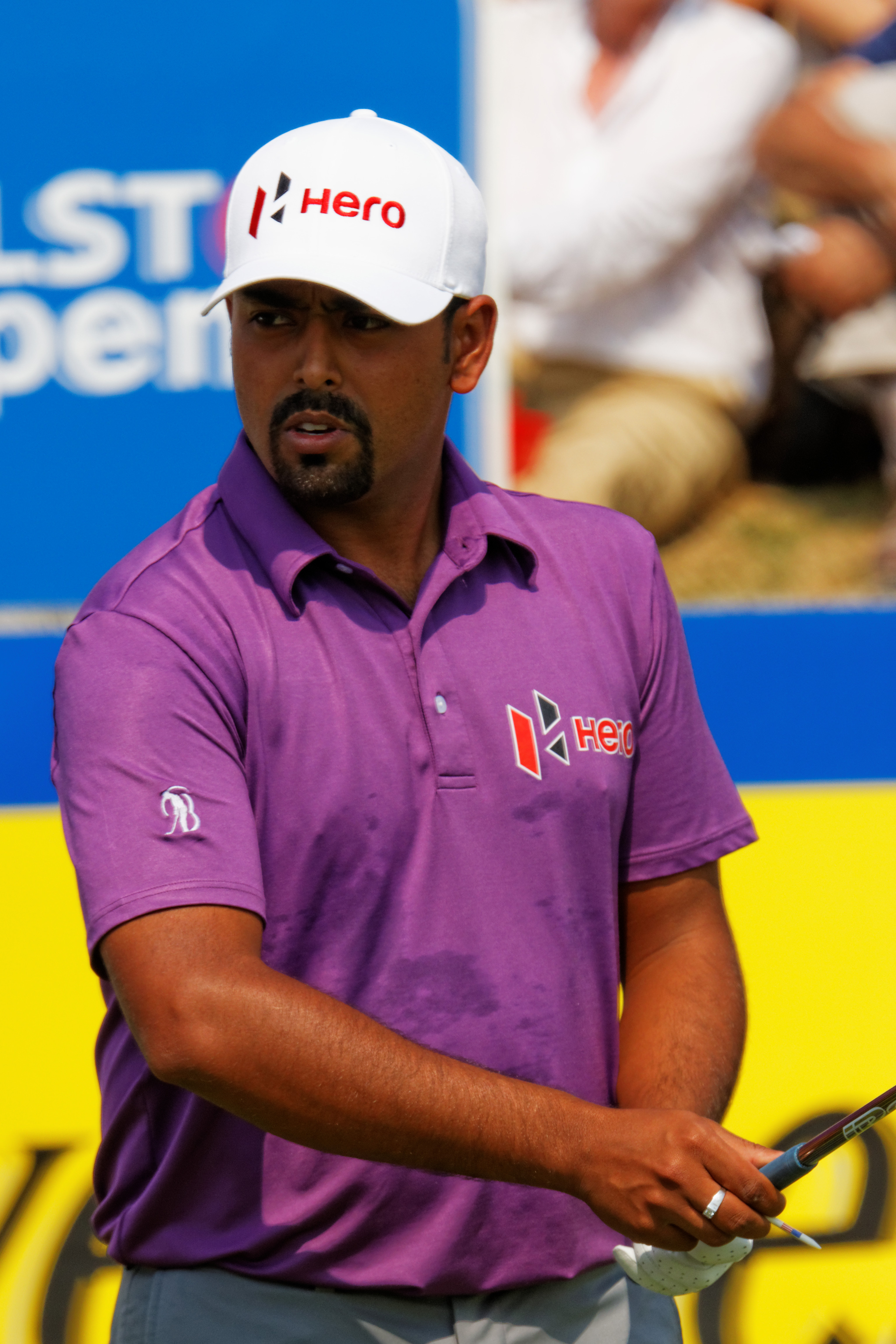
- Lahiri at the Alstom Open de France in 2015

Personal information
- Nickname: Baan
- Nationality: India
- Born: 29 June 1987 (age 39) Pune, India
- Height: 5 ft 9 in (175 cm)
- Spouse: Ipsa Jamwal Lahiri (m. 2014)
- Children: 2

Career
- Sport: Golf
- Turned professional: 2007
- Current tours: Asian Tour; LIV Golf
- Former tours: PGA Tour; European Tour; Professional Golf Tour of India
- Professional wins: 18
- Highest ranking: 33 (29 March 2015)

Number of wins by tour
- European Tour: 2
- Asian Tour: 7 (Tied 9th all time)
- Other: 12

Best results in major championships
- Masters Tournament: T42: 2016
- PGA Championship: T5: 2015
- U.S. Open: CUT: 2015, 2016, 2019
- The Open Championship: T30: 2015

Achievements and awards
- Professional Golf Tour of India Order of Merit winner: 2009
- Asian Tour Players' Player of the Year: 2014, 2015
- Asian Tour Order of Merit winner: 2015
Medal record
Asian Games
Silver medal – second place	2006 Doha	Men's team

Anirban Lahiri (Bengali: অনির্বাণ লাহিড়ী; born 29 June 1987) is an Indian professional golfer. He has played on the Asian Tour, European Tour, PGA Tour and LIV Golf. He was awarded the 2014 Arjuna Award and was also the recipient of the "Sera Bangali" award in 2015, given by the Anandabazar Patrika.

== Early life ==
Lahiri hails from a Bengali family. He learned to play golf at the age of eight from his father, Dr. Tushar Lahiri, who was a physician with the armed forces and a recreational golfer.

== Professional career ==
=== Asian Tour ===
Lahiri joined the Asian Tour in 2008. He picked up his first victory in 2011 at the Panasonic Open and his second victory in 2012 at the SAIL-SBI Open. His best finish on the Order of Merit came in 2014 with his maiden overseas win on the Asian Tour - CIMB Niaga Indonesian Masters which he later followed up with another one at the Venetian Macau Open. He finished 3rd on the Order of Merit in 2013.

Lahiri broke into the top 100 in the Official World Golf Ranking for the first time in March 2014 following a consistent season which included two victories on the Asian Tour.

Lahiri has also had a lot of success on the Professional Golf Tour of India, where he has won eleven events and the Order of Merit in 2009.

The big break came for him when qualified for his maiden major tournament – the 2012 Open Championship at the Royal Lytham & St Annes Golf Club in Lancashire. He made it a most memorable outing, first by making the cut (68-72) and then with a hole-in-one at the par-3 9th hole in the third round en route to a T31 finish.

=== European Tour ===
In February 2015, Lahiri claimed his first official win on the European Tour at the Maybank Malaysian Open, with a one stroke victory over Bernd Wiesberger. He shot a 10-under-par round of 62 during the third round to position himself going into the final day and came from four shots behind to prevail by one shot. Later the same month, Lahiri won his second event on the European Tour in his home country of India, at the Hero Indian Open. He came from seven strokes behind in the final round to force a playoff with Shiv Chawrasia, which he won with a birdie on the first extra hole. The two wins shot Lahiri into the top 50 of the Official World Golf Ranking qualifying him for the 2015 Masters Tournament. He was labelled as a "rookie to watch" and the "new face of Indian golf." He is the third Indian national to play in the Masters, after Jeev Milkha Singh and Arjun Atwal. He made the cut at his first appearance and ended the tournament with scores of 71-75-74-72 on his four rounds, leaving him tied for 49th with Jason Dufner.

In August 2015 at the PGA Championship which took place at Whistling Straits, Lahiri posted rounds of 70-67-70-68 for a score of −13. Despite a bogey at the 72nd hole, Lahiri finished in a tie for fifth place in the tournament and set a new record for the highest finish by an Indian professional golfer in a major. The top five finish on Sunday capped a memorable week in Wisconsin for Lahiri, whose performance catapulted him to 38th in the world golf ranking. He also won the PGA of America's pre-tournament long-drive contest on the Tuesday, hitting a 327-yard drive that won him a traditional gold money clip and a $25,000 charitable donation in his name. His performance set multiple records for an Indian golfer; he became the first Indian to shoot sub-par scores in all four rounds in a major, his total of 13-under was the best relative to par by an Indian at any major and his five-under 67 in the second round was also the best round by an Indian at any major.

=== PGA Tour ===
Lahiri was named to the 2015 Presidents Cup squad, the first player from India to earn the honor. Lahiri attempted to qualify for the PGA Tour through the 2015 Web.com Tour Finals after earning enough non-member points to qualify. He was the highest-ranked player in the Finals, 40th at the start of the four-event tournament. Lahiri only played in the first two events, but earned enough for a PGA Tour card. He notched his first top-10 of the 2016 PGA Tour season with a T-6 finish at the Dean & DeLuca Invitational.

Lahiri also qualified for the 2016 Summer Olympics, earning a spot in the field of 60 players to compete at the Olympic Golf Course in Rio de Janeiro. He also led for the first time after 54 holes in a PGA Tour event during the CIMB Classic in 2017, finishing T-3. He would go on to achieve his best PGA Tour finish of T-2 at the 2017 Memorial Tournament. Lahiri was once again named in the 2017 Presidents Cup team. Lahiri finished the 2017 PGA Tour season finishing a career high 51st in the FedEx Cup standings. In the 2018 PGA Tour season, Lahiri shot his lowest round on the PGA Tour, a 61 at A Military Tribute at The Greenbrier. His best finish was a T-5 at the CJ Cup in the 2018 PGA Tour season. Anirban struggled in the 2019 season and ended up losing his PGA Tour card by finishing outside the top 125 of the FedEx Cup. He gained his PGA Tour card back for the 2020 season through the Korn Ferry Tour Finals by finishing 10th in the overall standing. Lahiri struggled on the 2020 PGA Tour and finished 219th in the FedEx Cup standings, playing less than 15 events in large part due to being unable travel back to the United States and being stuck in India due to the country lockdown as a result of the pandemic. Lahiri managed to hold on to his PGA Tour card due to circumstances related to the pandemic which resulted in postponement and cancellation of events, players who were on the PGA Tour for the 2020 season maintained guaranteed status for the 2021 season. He finished 118th in the FedEx Cup for the 2021 season retaining his card for the 2022 PGA Tour season with a highest finish of T3 at the Barbasol Championship.

In March 2022, Lahiri finished second at The Players Championship by one stroke to Cameron Smith. The Players is held at TPC Sawgrass in Ponte Vedra Beach, Florida. It has one of the strongest fields of the year and has the richest purse of any tournament. By finishing second, Lahiri won $2,180,000, more than he ever won in a full PGA Tour season prior to this tournament.

=== LIV Golf ===
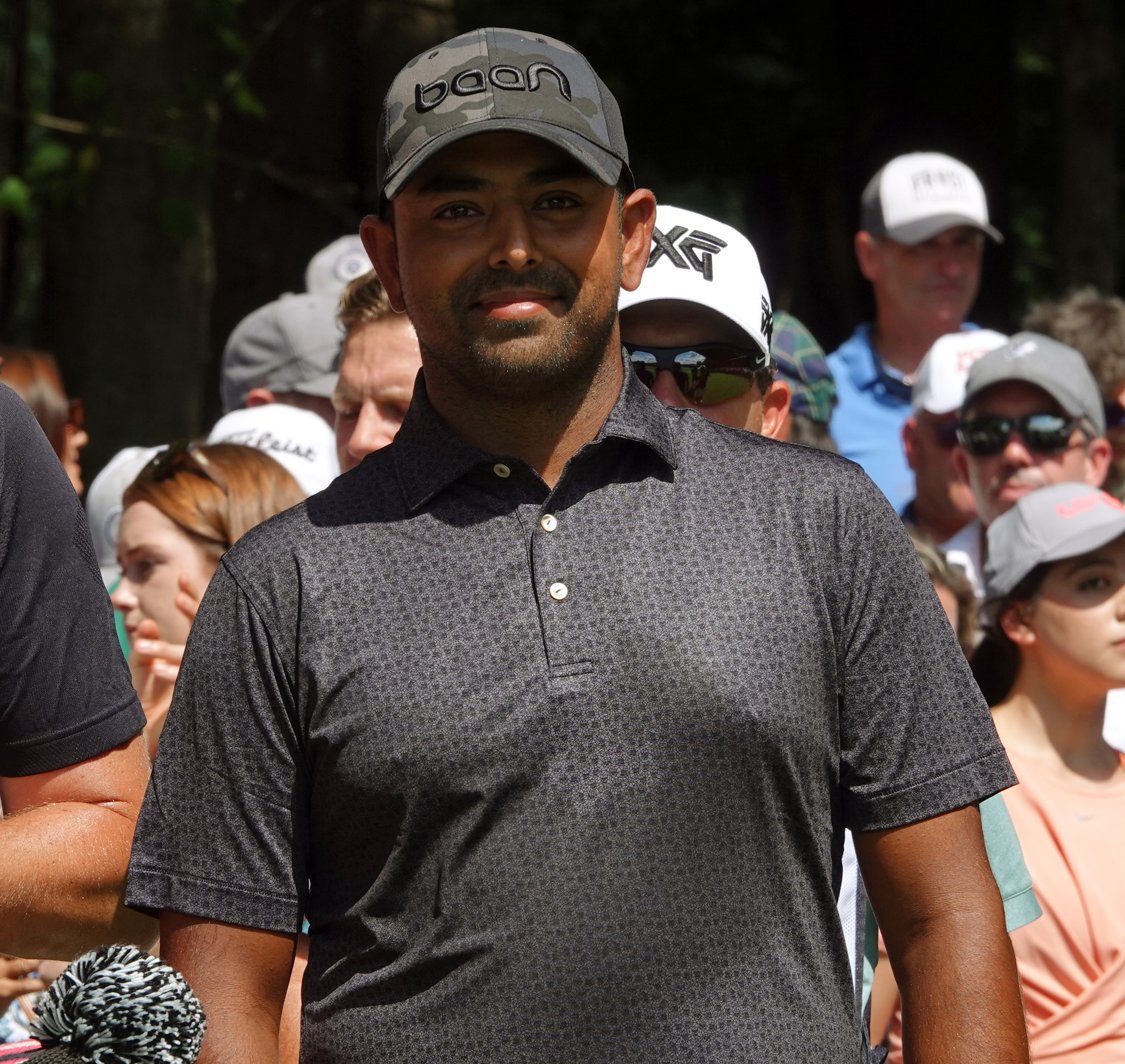
Anirban Lahiri looks on at the first tee box at the LIV Golf Invitational Boston at The International Golf Club in Bolton, MA.

In August 2022, it was announced that Lahiri had joined LIV Golf. At his first LIV Golf tournament, Lahiri finished in a three-way tie for first place at the LIV Golf Invitational Boston with Dustin Johnson and Joaquín Niemann. Lahiri lost the playoff to Johnson to finish second, earning $1,812,500 in the process. Lahiri went on to finish runner-up twice in the 2023 LIV Golf season ending up 13th in the player standing for the season. He also finished runner-up in the 2024 season at LIV Golf Andalucía. Leading the tournament on the final hole of regulation play, he missed a two-foot putt to win the tournament. Eventually losing a playoff to Sergio García on the second extra hole. Lahiri was subsequently omitted from the Indian contingent for the Paris Olympics in 2024.

== Personal life ==
Lahiri is a resident of Palm Beach Gardens, Florida. He is of Bengali descent and speaks Bengali, Hindi and Punjabi in addition to English. In May 2014, he married his long-time partner, Ipsa Jamwal. His personal interests include listening to music and computer gaming.

== Professional wins (18) ==
=== European Tour wins (2) ===
No.	Date	Tournament	Winning score	Margin of victory	Runner-up
1	8 Feb 2015	Maybank Malaysian Open^{1}	−16 (70-72-62-68=272)	1 stroke	(Austria) Bernd Wiesberger
2	22 Feb 2015	Hero Indian Open^{1}	−7 (73-65-70-69=277)	Playoff	(India) Shiv Chawrasia

^{1}Co-sanctioned by the Asian Tour

European Tour playoff record (1–0)

No.	Year	Tournament	Opponent	Result
1	2015	Hero Indian Open	(India) Shiv Chawrasia	Won with birdie on first extra hole

=== Asian Tour wins (7) ===
No.	Date	Tournament	Winning score	Margin of victory	Runner(s)-up
1	9 Apr 2011	Panasonic Open (India)^{1}	−13 (65-71-68-71=275)	Playoff	(India) Manav Jaini, (Singapore) Mardan Mamat
2	25 Feb 2012	SAIL-SBI Open^{1}	−14 (65-69-67-73=274)	Playoff	(Thailand) Prom Meesawat
3	9 Mar 2013	SAIL-SBI Open^{1} (2)	−15 (71-68-66-68=273)	Playoff	(India) Rashid Khan
4	27 Apr 2014	CIMB Niaga Indonesian Masters	−17 (70-69-64-68=271)	1 stroke	(South Korea) Baek Seuk-hyun, (Australia) Cameron Smith
5	26 Oct 2014	Venetian Macau Open	−17 (61-73-67-66=267)	1 stroke	(Australia) Scott Hend, (Thailand) Prom Meesawat
6	8 Feb 2015	Maybank Malaysian Open^{2}	−16 (70-72-62-68=272)	1 stroke	(Austria) Bernd Wiesberger
7	22 Feb 2015	Hero Indian Open^{2}	−7 (73-65-70-69=277)	Playoff	(India) Shiv Chawrasia

^{1}Co-sanctioned by the Professional Golf Tour of India
^{2}Co-sanctioned by the European Tour

Asian Tour playoff record (4–1)

No.	Year	Tournament	Opponent(s)	Result
1	2011	Panasonic Open (India)	(India) Manav Jaini, (Singapore) Mardan Mamat	Won with birdie on first extra hole
2	2012	SAIL-SBI Open	(Thailand) Prom Meesawat	Won after concession on first extra hole
3	2013	SAIL-SBI Open	(India) Rashid Khan	Won with birdie on first extra hole
4	2015	Hero Indian Open	(India) Shiv Chawrasia	Won with birdie on first extra hole
5	2016	Venetian Macao Open	(Thailand) Pavit Tangkamolprasert	Lost to birdie on first extra hole

=== Professional Golf Tour of India wins (14) ===
No.	Date	Tournament	Winning score	Margin of victory	Runner(s)-up
1	27 Sep 2009	Haryana Open	−10 (69-69-71-69=278)	1 stroke	(India) Chinnaswamy Muniyappa
2	8 Nov 2009	BILT Open	−20 (66-65-66-71= 268)	7 strokes	(India) Naman Dawar
3	14 May 2010	PGTI Players Championship (Aamby Valley)	−24 (65-65-67-67=264)	6 strokes	(India) Shamim Khan
4	2 Jul 2010	Aircel PGTI Players Championship (Oxford)	−21 (65-68-67-67=267)	6 strokes	(India) Himmat Rai
5	30 Oct 2010	BILT Open	−11 (68-68-71-70=277)	4 strokes	(India) Amardeep Malik
6	11 Feb 2011	Aircel PGTI Players Championship (Tollygunge)	−18 (68-65-65-64=270)	8 strokes	(India) Rashid Khan, (India) Jyoti Randhawa
7	2 Apr 2011	Aircel PGTI Players Championship (Panchkula)	−14 (72-65-70-67=274)	2 strokes	(India) Mukesh Kumar
8	9 Apr 2011	Panasonic Open (India)^{1}	−13 (65-71-68-71=275)	Playoff	(India) Manav Jaini, (Singapore) Mardan Mamat
9	25 Feb 2012	SAIL-SBI Open^{1}	−14 (65-69-67-73=274)	Playoff	(Thailand) Prom Meesawat
10	9 Mar 2013	SAIL-SBI Open^{1} (2)	−15 (71-68-66-68=273)	Playoff	(India) Rashid Khan
11	28 Jun 2013	PGTI Players Championship (Oxford)	−10 (71-67-68-72=278)	Playoff	(India) Shamim Khan
12	5 Jul 2013	Eagleburg Open	−20 (73-62-64-69=268)	5 strokes	(India) S. Chikkarangappa
13	29 Dec 2013	McLeod Russel Tour Championship	−17 (66-71-65-69=271)	4 strokes	(India) Rahil Gangjee
14	1 Feb 2014	Ahmedabad Masters	−14 (64-70-71-69=274)	6 strokes	(India) Rahil Gangjee

^{1}Co-sanctioned by the Asian Tour

== Playoff record ==
LIV Golf League playoff record (0–2)

No.	Year	Tournament	Opponent(s)	Result
1	2022	LIV Golf Boston	(United States) Dustin Johnson, (Chile) Joaquín Niemann	Johnson won with eagle on first extra hole
2	2024	LIV Golf Andalucía	(Spain) Sergio García	Lost to par on second extra hole

== Results in major championships ==
Results not in chronological order in 2020.

Tournament	2012	2013	2014	2015	2016	2017	2018
Masters Tournament				T49	T42		
U.S. Open				CUT	CUT		
The Open Championship	T31		CUT	T30	T68	CUT	CUT
PGA Championship			CUT	T5	CUT	75	CUT

Tournament	2019	2020	2021	2022	2023
Masters Tournament					
PGA Championship				CUT	CUT
U.S. Open	CUT				
The Open Championship		NT			

Top 10
Did not play

CUT = missed the half-way cut
"T" indicates a tie for a place
NT = No tournament due to COVID-19 pandemic

=== Summary ===
Tournament	Wins	2nd	3rd	Top-5	Top-10	Top-25	Events	Cuts made
Masters Tournament	0	0	0	0	0	0	2	2
PGA Championship	0	0	0	1	1	1	7	2
U.S. Open	0	0	0	0	0	0	3	0
The Open Championship	0	0	0	0	0	0	6	3
Totals	0	0	0	1	1	1	18	7

- Most consecutive cuts made – 3 (2015 Open – 2016 Masters)
- Longest streak of top 10s – 1

== Results in The Players Championship ==
Tournament	2015	2016	2017	2018	2019	2020	2021	2022
The Players Championship	CUT		CUT	CUT	T74	C	CUT	2

Top 10
Did not play

CUT = missed the halfway cut
"T" indicates a tie for a place
C = Canceled after the first round due to the COVID-19 pandemic

== Results in World Golf Championships ==
Results not in chronological order before 2015.

Tournament	2014	2015	2016	2017	2018
Championship		T71	T28		
Match Play		T34	T28		
Invitational		T53	T33		T6
Champions	T28	T40			

Top 10
Did not play

"T" = Tied

== Team appearances ==
Amateur

- Asian Junior Golf Team Championship: 2005 (Team Gold Medal)
- World Junior Golf Team Championship: 2005
- Eisenhower Trophy: 2006
- Doha Asian Games: 2006
- Nomura Cup: 2007

Professional

- World Cup (representing India): 2013, 2018
- EurAsia Cup (representing Asia): 2014, 2016, 2018
- Presidents Cup (representing the International team): 2015, 2017

== See also ==
- 2014 European Tour Qualifying School graduates
- 2015 Web.com Tour Finals graduates
- 2019 Korn Ferry Tour Finals graduates
- List of golfers with most Asian Tour wins
