= Trevor Simsby =

American professional golfer

Personal information
- Nationality: United States
- Born: October 13, 1992 (age 34) Carlsbad, California, U.S.
- Height: 6 ft 2 in (188 cm)

Career
- Sport: Golf
- College: University of Washington
- Turned professional: 2014
- Former tours: Web.com Tour; Asian Tour; Asian Development Tour; China Tour
- Professional wins: 1

Number of wins by tour
- Asian Tour: 1

Trevor Simsby (born October 13, 1992) is an American professional golfer.

Simsby won the rain-shortened Bandar Malaysia Open on the Asian Tour in a playoff. This was the final event on tour for the calendar year of 2020 as the remaining events were cancelled due to the COVID-19 pandemic. With only a handful of events played in that season, Simsby was in the top-two of money earners on tour, qualifying him for the 2021 WGC-Workday Championship. The previous season, Simsby played on the Asian Development Tour.

== Amateur wins ==
- 2012 PAC-12 Preview

== Professional wins (1) ==
=== Asian Tour wins (1) ===
No.	Date	Tournament	Winning score	Margin of victory	Runners-up
1	Mar 7, 2020	Bandar Malaysia Open	−13 (69-64-70=203) (Note: Shortened to 54 holes due to weather.)	Playoff	(Australia) Andrew Dodt, (United States) Jarin Todd

Asian Tour playoff record (1–0)

No.	Year	Tournament	Opponents	Result
1	2020	Bandar Malaysia Open	(Australia) Andrew Dodt, (United States) Jarin Todd	Won with birdie on second extra hole Todd eliminated by birdie on first hole

== Results in World Golf Championships ==
Tournament	2021
Championship	T37
Match Play	
Invitational	
Champions	NT^{1}

^{1}Cancelled due to COVID-19 pandemic

Did not play

"T" = Tied
NT = No tournament
