= Bangladesh Open =

Golf tournament on the Asian Tour

Coordinates: 23.801°N 90.397°E

Bangabandhu Cup Golf Open
Tournament information
- Location: Dhaka, Bangladesh
- Established: 2015
- Course: Kurmitola Golf Club
- Par: 71
- Length: 6,642 yards (6,073 m)
- Tours: Asian Tour; Professional Golf Tour of India
- Format: Stroke play
- Prize fund: US$400,000
- Month played: November

Tournament record score
- Aggregate: 263 Thitiphun Chuayprakong (2016)
- To par: −21 as above

Current champion
- (Thailand) Danthai Boonma

Final champion
- Location in Bangladesh

The Bangladesh Open is a golf tournament on the Asian Tour. The inaugural tournament was played from 27 to 30 May 2015 at Kurmitola Golf Club, in Dhaka, Bangladesh.

== Winners ==
Year	Tour (Note: ASA − Asian Tour; PGTI − Professional Golf Tour of India.)	Winner	Score	To par	Margin of victory	Runner(s)-up
Bangabandhu Cup Golf Bangladesh Open
2022	ASA	(Thailand) Danthai Boonma	271	−13	1 stroke	(Thailand) Kosuke Hamamoto
2021: No tournament
Bangabandhu Cup Golf Open
2020	ASA	Cancelled due to the COVID-19 pandemic				
2019	ASA	(Thailand) Sadom Kaewkanjana	265	−19	1 stroke	(India) Ajeetesh Sandhu
AB Bank Bangladesh Open
2018	ASA	(Sweden) Malcolm Kokocinski	270	−14	3 strokes	(New Zealand) Ben Campbell (England) Jack Harrison
Bashundhara Bangladesh Open
2017	ASA	(Thailand) Jazz Janewattananond	267	−17	4 strokes	(Bangladesh) Siddikur Rahman
2016	ASA	(Thailand) Thitiphun Chuayprakong	263	−21	2 strokes	(Thailand) Sutijet Kooratanapisan
2015	ASA	(Singapore) Mardan Mamat	270	−14	2 strokes	(India) Khalin Joshi (South Korea) Lee Soo-min
2013–14: No tournament
American Express Bangladesh Open
2012	PGTI	(Bangladesh) Zamal Hossain (2)	277	−11	3 strokes	(Bangladesh) Siddikur Rahman
2011	PGTI	(India) Gaganjeet Bhullar	274	−14	2 strokes	(Bangladesh) Siddikur Rahman
2010	PGTI	(Bangladesh) Siddikur Rahman	272	−16	7 strokes	(India) Sujjan Singh
City Bank - Dhaka Bank Bangladesh Open
2009	PGTI	(Bangladesh) Zamal Hossain	275	−13	5 strokes	(India) Harendra Gupta (India) Shamim Khan (India) Sanjay Kumar

== See also ==
- Open golf tournament
