= 2013 Professional Golf Tour of India =

Golf tour season

2013 Professional Golf Tour of India season
- Duration: 31 January 2013 – 29 December 2013
- Number of official events: 20
- Most wins: (India) Anirban Lahiri (4)
- Order of Merit: (India) Rashid Khan

The 2013 Professional Golf Tour of India was the seventh season of the Professional Golf Tour of India, the main professional golf tour in India since it was formed in 2006.

== Schedule ==
The following table lists official events during the 2013 season.

Date	Tournament	Location	Purse (₹)	Winner (Note: The number in brackets after each winner's name is the number of Professional Golf Tour of India events they had won up to and including that tournament.)	OWGR points	Other tours (Note: ASA − Asian Tour; CHA − Challenge Tour.)
1 Feb	Gujarat Kensville Challenge	Gujarat	€200,000	(India) Shiv Kapur (1)	12	CHA
22 Feb	PGTI Players Championship (Chandigarh I)	Haryana	2,500,000	(India) Mukesh Kumar (15)	n/a	
1 Mar	PGTI Players Championship (Classic I)	Haryana	2,500,000	(India) Shamim Khan (7)	n/a	
9 Mar	SAIL-SBI Open	Delhi	US$300,000	(India) Anirban Lahiri (10)	14	ASA
7 Apr	Panasonic Open India	Delhi	US$300,000	(Australia) Wade Ormsby (n/a)	14	ASA
12 Apr	PGTI Players Championship (Classic II)	Haryana	3,000,000	(India) Rashid Khan (3)	n/a	
19 Apr	Sri Lanka Ports Authority Open	Sri Lanka	US$70,000	(India) Chiragh Kumar (4)	n/a	
26 Apr	Jaypee Greens Open	Uttar Pradesh	2,000,000	(India) Manav Jaini (2)	n/a	
11 May	Surya Nepal Masters	Nepal	3,000,000	(Nepal) Shivaram Shrestha (1)	n/a	
28 Jun	PGTI Players Championship (Oxford)	Maharashtra	3,000,000	(India) Anirban Lahiri (11)	n/a	
5 Jul	Eagleburg Open	Karnataka	3,000,000	(India) Anirban Lahiri (12)	n/a	
20 Sep	PGTI Players Championship (Chandigarh II)	Haryana	3,000,000	(India) Rahil Gangjee (2)	n/a	
27 Sep	PGTI Players Championship (Panchkula)	Haryana	3,000,000	(India) Shankar Das (4)	n/a	
26 Oct	BILT Open	Uttar Pradesh	10,000,000	(India) Rashid Khan (4)	n/a	
16 Nov	IndianOil Servo Masters Golf	Assam	3,000,000	(Australia) Kunal Bhasin (3)	n/a	
30 Nov	CG Open	Maharashtra	10,000,000	(India) S. Chikkarangappa (1)	n/a	
8 Dec	Dialog Enterprise International	Sri Lanka	4,000,000	(India) Angad Cheema (1)	n/a	
14 Dec	PGTI Players Championship (Noida)	Uttar Pradesh	2,500,000	(Sri Lanka) Nadaraja Thangaraja (1)	n/a	
22 Dec	Tata Open	Jharkhand	5,000,000	(India) M. Dharma (1)	n/a	
29 Dec	McLeod Russel Tour Championship	West Bengal	10,350,000	(India) Anirban Lahiri (13)	n/a	

== Order of Merit ==
The Order of Merit was titled as the Rolex Rankings and was based on prize money won during the season, calculated in Indian rupees.

Position	Player	Prize money (₹)
1	(India) Rashid Khan	4,638,284
2	(India) S. Chikkarangappa	3,265,313
3	(India) Angad Cheema	2,650,448
4	(India) Shamim Khan	2,608,508
5	(India) Mukesh Kumar	2,259,917
