= Jbe' Kruger =

South African professional golfer (born 1986)

Personal information
- Full name: James Barry Kruger
- Nickname: Jbe'
- Nationality: South Africa
- Born: 23 June 1986 (age 40) Kimberley, South Africa
- Height: 1.66 m (5 ft 5 in)
- Weight: 61 kg (134 lb; 9.6 st)

Career
- Sport: Golf
- Turned professional: 2007
- Current tours: Asian Tour; Sunshine Tour
- Former tours: European Tour; Japan Golf Tour
- Professional wins: 9

Number of wins by tour
- European Tour: 1
- Japan Golf Tour: 2
- Asian Tour: 3
- Sunshine Tour: 5

Best results in major championships
- Masters Tournament: DNP
- PGA Championship: DNP
- U.S. Open: DNP
- The Open Championship: CUT: 2012, 2017

James Barry "Jbe'" Kruger (born 23 June 1986) is a South African professional golfer who plays on the Japan Golf Tour, the Sunshine Tour and the Asian Tour. He was born in Kimberley, Northern Cape and turned professional in 2007.

== Professional career ==
Kruger has won five times on the Sunshine Tour. He won the Avantha Masters in February 2012, an event co-sanctioned by the European Tour and Asian Tour. He also won the Shinhan Donghae Open in September 2019, which was co-sanctioned by the Japan Golf Tour, the Asian Tour and the Korean Tour.

In July 2023, Kruger claimed his second win on the Japan Golf Tour at the Shigeo Nagashima Invitational Sega Sammy Cup. He also won the Mercuries Taiwan Masters in October 2024.

== Professional wins (9) ==
=== European Tour wins (1) ===
No.	Date	Tournament	Winning score	Margin of victory	Runners-up
1	19 Feb 2012	Avantha Masters^{1}	−14 (70-69-66-69=274)	2 strokes	(Spain) Jorge Campillo, (Germany) Marcel Siem

^{1}Co-sanctioned by the Asian Tour

=== Japan Golf Tour wins (2) ===
No.	Date	Tournament	Winning score	Margin of victory	Runner(s)-up
1	22 Sep 2019	Shinhan Donghae Open^{1}	−15 (69-67-68-65=269)	2 strokes	(United States) Chan Kim
2	2 Jul 2023	Shigeo Nagashima Invitational Sega Sammy Cup	−23 (66-67-65-67=265)	3 strokes	(Japan) Naoyuki Kataoka, (Australia) Anthony Quayle

^{1}Co-sanctioned by the Asian Tour and the Korean Tour

=== Asian Tour wins (3) ===
No.	Date	Tournament	Winning score	Margin of victory	Runner(s)-up
1	19 Feb 2012	Avantha Masters^{1}	−14 (70-69-66-69=274)	2 strokes	(Spain) Jorge Campillo, (Germany) Marcel Siem
2	22 Sep 2019	Shinhan Donghae Open^{2}	−15 (69-67-68-65=269)	2 strokes	(United States) Chan Kim
3	6 Oct 2024	Mercuries Taiwan Masters^{3}	−8 (68-71-69=208) (Note: Shortened to 54 holes due to Typhoon Krathon.)	2 strokes	(Thailand) Pavit Tangkamolprasert, (South Korea) Wang Jeung-hun

^{1}Co-sanctioned by the European Tour
^{2}Co-sanctioned by the Japan Golf Tour and the Korean Tour
^{3}Co-sanctioned by the Taiwan PGA Tour

Asian Tour playoff record (0–1)

No.	Year	Tournament	Opponent	Result
1	2010	Brunei Open	(Bangladesh) Siddikur Rahman	Lost to par on first extra hole

=== Sunshine Tour wins (5) ===
No.	Date	Tournament	Winning score	Margin of victory	Runner(s)-up
1	30 Aug 2009	Zambia Open	−15 (69-68-67=204)	3 strokes	(South Africa) Titch Moore
2	24 Apr 2010	Africom Zimbabwe Open	−19 (68-69-67-65=269)	2 strokes	(South Africa) Jaco van Zyl
3	13 Apr 2014	Golden Pilsener Zimbabwe Open (2)	−18 (67-69-68-66=270)	1 stroke	(South Africa) Jacques Blaauw
4	11 Aug 2017	Sun Carnival City Challenge	−11 (66-69-70=205)	1 stroke	(South Africa) Neil Schietekat, (South Africa) J. J. Senekal
5	21 Mar 2021	Gauteng Championship	−21 (70-64-67-66=267)	2 strokes	(South Africa) Martin Rohwer

== Results in major championships ==
Tournament	2012	2013	2014	2015	2016	2017
Masters Tournament						
U.S. Open						
The Open Championship	CUT					CUT
PGA Championship						

Did not play

CUT = missed the half-way cut
"T" = tied

== Results in World Golf Championships ==
Results not in chronological order before 2015.

Tournament	2011	2012	2013	2014	2015	2016	2017	2018	2019
Championship		T57							
Match Play									
Invitational									
Champions	T23	68							T60

Did not play

"T" = Tied
