= Sarawak Championship =

Tournament information
- Location: Kuching, Sarawak, Malaysia
- Established: 2018
- Courses: Damai Golf and Country Club
- Par: 72
- Length: 6,970 yards (6,370 m)
- Tour: Asian Tour
- Format: Stroke play
- Prize fund: US$300,000
- Month played: August
- Final year: 2019

Tournament record score
- Aggregate: 264 Andrew Dodt (2019); 264 Richard T. Lee (2019)
- To par: −24 as above

Final champion
- (Australia) Andrew Dodt

Location map
- Location in Malaysia

The Sarawak Championship was a golf tournament on the Asian Tour. It was first played in July 2018 at Damai Golf and Country Club in Sarawak, Malaysia. It was the first Asian Tour event to be played in Sarawak, although an Asian Development Tour event was held there each season from 2012 to 2017.

== Winners ==
Year	Winner	Score	To par	Margin of victory	Runner(s)-up
2019	(Australia) Andrew Dodt	264	−24	Playoff	(Canada) Richard T. Lee
2018	(United States) John Catlin	266	−22	1 stroke	(Thailand) Danthai Boonma (Thailand) Jazz Janewattananond (United States) Paul Peterson
