= Darren Beck =

Australian professional golfer

Personal information
- Nationality: Australia
- Born: 14 July 1978 (age 48) South Africa

Career
- Sport: Golf
- Turned professional: 2004
- Current tour: Asian Tour
- Former tour: PGA Tour of Australasia
- Professional wins: 3

Number of wins by tour
- Asian Tour: 1
- PGA Tour of Australasia: 1
- Other: 1

Darren Beck (born 14 July 1978) is an Australian professional golfer who currently plays on the Asian Tour.

== Early life ==
Beck was born in South Africa. He moved to Australia at the age of seven.

== Professional career ==
In 2004, Beck turned professional. He won the PGA Tour of Australasia's qualifying school in 2004 and played on the PGA Tour of Australasia in 2005 and 2007. He won the 2008 Callaway Hi-Lite Pro-Am in Australia.

Beck joined the Asian Tour in 2008 after going through qualifying school in 2007. He finished in 29th on the Order of Merit in his rookie season and recorded a runner-up finish at the Hero Honda Indian Open. He won his first tour event in 2009 at the Brunei Open in dramatic fashion. Beck was six strokes off the lead going into the final round and shot a 65 (−6) on Sunday to force a playoff with Gaganjeet Bhullar and Boonchu Ruangkit. Boonchu was eliminated on the second playoff hole and Beck won the tournament on the third playoff hole when he sunk a 10-foot birdie putt while Bhullar could only par the hole.

== Professional wins (3) ==
=== Asian Tour wins (1) ===
No.	Date	Tournament	Winning score	Margin of victory	Runners-up
1	2 Aug 2009	Brunei Open	−13 (71-67-68-65=271)	Playoff	(India) Gaganjeet Bhullar, (Thailand) Boonchu Ruangkit

Asian Tour playoff record (1–0)

No.	Year	Tournament	Opponents	Result
1	2009	Brunei Open	(India) Gaganjeet Bhullar, (Thailand) Boonchu Ruangkit	Won with birdie on third extra hole Ruangkit eliminated by par on second hole

=== PGA Tour of Australasia wins (1) ===
No.	Date	Tournament	Winning score	Margin of victory	Runner-up
1	13 Oct 2019	TX Civil & Logistics WA PGA Championship	−16 (68-67-68-69=272)	2 strokes	(Australia) Jarryd Felton

=== Other wins (1) ===
No.	Date	Tournament	Winning score	Margin of victory	Runners-up
1	4 Oct 2008	Callaway Hi-Lite Pro-Am	−9 (65-69=134)	4 strokes	(Australia) Brad Andrews, (Australia) Marcus Cain

== Team appearances ==
Amateur

- Australian Men's Interstate Teams Matches (representing New South Wales): 2004
