= Thailand Golf Championship =

Coordinates: 13.4167°N 101.0133°E

Tournament information
- Location: Bangkok, Thailand
- Established: 2011
- Course: Amata Spring Country Club
- Par: 72
- Length: 7,488 yards (6,847 m)
- Tour: Asian Tour
- Format: Stroke play
- Prize fund: US$1,000,000
- Month played: December
- Final year: 2015

Tournament record score
- Aggregate: 263 Charl Schwartzel (2012)
- To par: −25 as above

Final champion
- (Wales) Jamie Donaldson
- Location in Thailand

The Thailand Golf Championship was a golf tournament on the Asian Tour. It was played for the first time in December 2011 at the Amata Spring Country Club in Bangkok, Thailand. The purse in 2015 was US$1,000,000. For its whole existence, it was the flagship event of the Asian Tour, with a guaranteed minimum of 20 Official World Golf Ranking points for the winner, compared to a minimum of 14 for other events.

== Winners ==
Asian Tour (Flagship event)	2011–2015

#	Year	Winner	Score	To par	Margin of victory	Runner(s)-up
5th	2015	(Wales) Jamie Donaldson	267	−21	3 strokes	(France) Clément Sordet (England) Lee Westwood
4th	2014	(England) Lee Westwood (2)	280	−8	1 stroke	(Australia) Marcus Fraser (Germany) Martin Kaymer
3rd	2013	(Spain) Sergio García	266	−22	4 strokes	(Sweden) Henrik Stenson
2nd	2012	(South Africa) Charl Schwartzel	263	−25	11 strokes	(Thailand) Thitiphun Chuayprakong (United States) Bubba Watson
1st	2011	(England) Lee Westwood	266	−22	7 strokes	(South Africa) Charl Schwartzel
