= 2015 Asian Tour =

Golf tour season

2015 Asian Tour season
- Duration: 5 February 2015 – 20 December 2015
- Number of official events: 20
- Most wins: (India) Anirban Lahiri (2)
- Order of Merit: (India) Anirban Lahiri
- Players' Player of the Year: (India) Anirban Lahiri
- Rookie of the Year: (Thailand) Natipong Srithong

The 2015 Asian Tour was the 21st season of the modern Asian Tour (formerly the Asian PGA Tour), the main professional golf tour in Asia (outside of Japan) since it was established in 1995.

== Schedule ==
The following table lists official events during the 2015 season.

Date	Tournament	Host country	Purse (US$)	Winner (Note: The number in brackets after each winner's name is the number of Asian Tour events they had won up to and including that tournament. This information is only shown for Asian Tour members.)	OWGR points	Other tours (Note: AFR − Sunshine Tour; EUR − European Tour; JPN − Japan Golf Tour; PGAT − PGA Tour; PGTI − Professional Golf Tour of India; TWN − Taiwan PGA Tour.)	Notes
8 Feb	Maybank Malaysian Open	Malaysia	3,000,000	(India) Anirban Lahiri (6)	38	EUR	
15 Feb	True Thailand Classic	Thailand	2,000,000	(Australia) Andrew Dodt (2)	28	EUR	New tournament
22 Feb	Hero Indian Open	India	1,500,000	(India) Anirban Lahiri (7)	19	EUR	
26 Apr	CIMB Niaga Indonesian Masters	Indonesia	750,000	(England) Lee Westwood (n/a)	14		
10 May	AfrAsia Bank Mauritius Open	Mauritius	€1,000,000	(South Africa) George Coetzee (n/a)	17	AFR, EUR	New tournament
30 May	Bashundhara Bangladesh Open	Bangladesh	300,000	(Singapore) Mardan Mamat (5)	14		New tournament
21 Jun	Queen's Cup	Thailand	300,000	(Thailand) Prayad Marksaeng (9)	14		
26 Jul	Omega European Masters	Switzerland	€2,700,000	(England) Danny Willett (n/a)	32	EUR	
27 Sep	Asia-Pacific Diamond Cup Golf	Japan	¥150,000,000	(South Korea) Kim Kyung-tae (2)	15	JPN	
4 Oct	Mercuries Taiwan Masters	Taiwan	650,000	(Malaysia) Danny Chia (2)	14	TWN	
11 Oct	Yeangder Tournament Players Championship	Taiwan	500,000	(South Africa) Shaun Norris (1)	14	TWN	
18 Oct	Venetian Macau Open	Macau	1,000,000	(Australia) Scott Hend (7)	17		
25 Oct	UBS Hong Kong Open	Hong Kong	2,000,000	(England) Justin Rose (n/a)	34	EUR	
1 Nov	CIMB Classic	Malaysia	7,000,000	(United States) Justin Thomas (n/a)	46	PGAT	Limited-field event
8 Nov	Panasonic Open India	India	400,000	(India) Chiragh Kumar (1)	14	PGTI	
15 Nov	World Classic Championship	Singapore	750,000	(Thailand) Danthai Boonma (1)	14		
22 Nov	Resorts World Manila Masters	Philippines	1,000,000	(Thailand) Natipong Srithong (1)	14		
6 Dec	Ho Tram Open	Vietnam	1,500,000	(Spain) Sergio García (4)	14		New tournament
13 Dec	Thailand Golf Championship	Thailand	1,000,000	(Wales) Jamie Donaldson (n/a)	34		Flagship event
20 Dec	Philippine Open	Philippines	300,000	(Philippines) Miguel Tabuena (1)	14		

== Order of Merit ==
The Order of Merit was based on prize money won during the season, calculated in U.S. dollars.

Position	Player	Prize money ($)
1	(India) Anirban Lahiri	1,139,085
2	(Australia) Scott Hend	491,632
3	(Australia) Andrew Dodt	434,474
4	(India) Shiv Chawrasia	343,273
5	(United States) Paul Peterson	289,872

== Awards ==
Award	Winner	Ref.
Players' Player of the Year	(India) Anirban Lahiri	
Rookie of the Year	(Thailand) Natipong Srithong	

== See also ==
- 2015 Asian Development Tour
