= Mardan Mamat =

Singaporean professional golfer (born 1967)

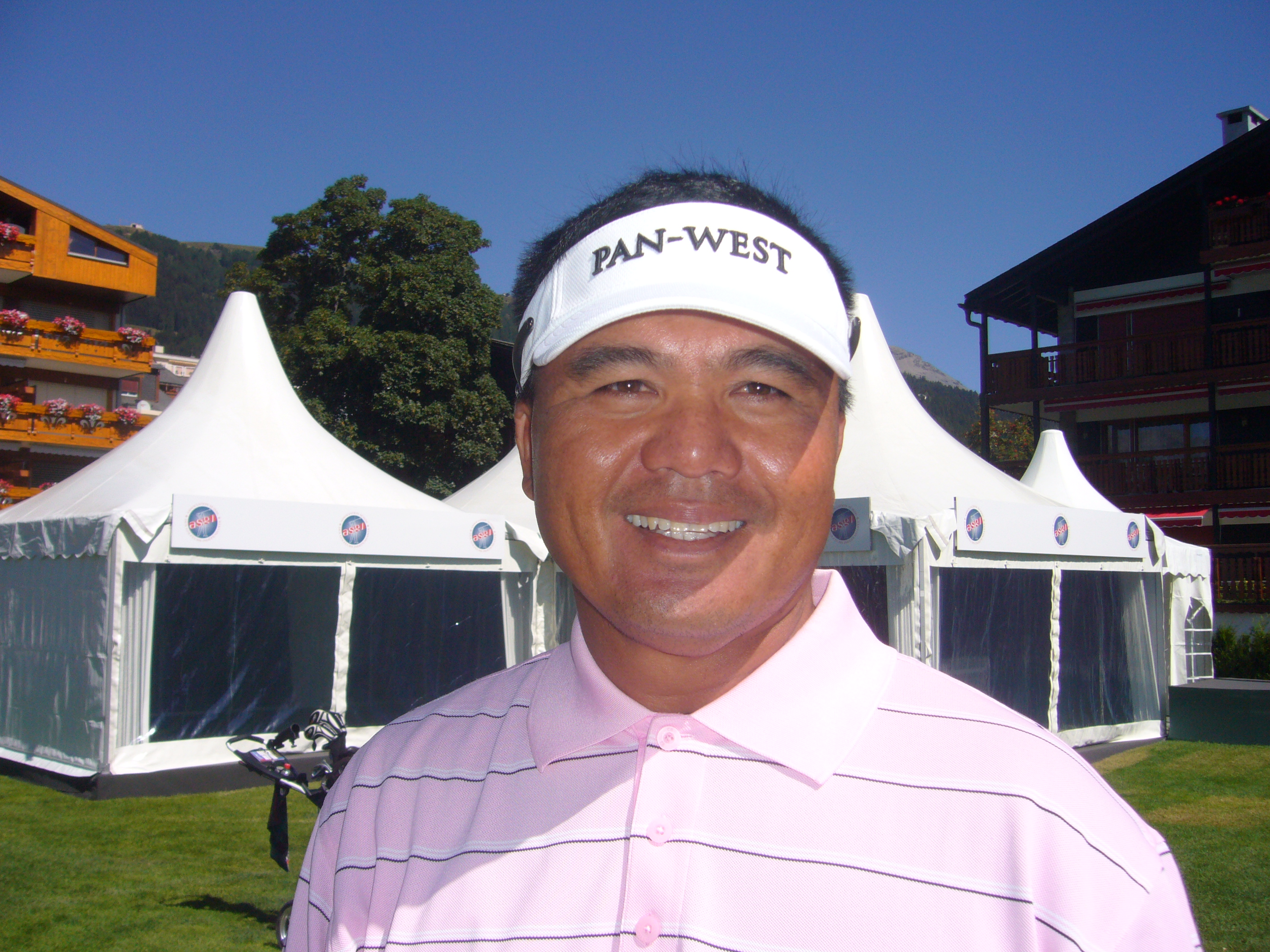

Personal information
- Nationality: Singapore
- Born: 31 October 1967 (age 59) Singapore
- Height: 1.80 m (5 ft 11 in)
- Weight: 90 kg (198 lb; 14 st 2 lb)

Career
- Sport: Golf
- Turned professional: 1994
- Current tour: Asian Tour
- Former tour: European Tour
- Professional wins: 15

Number of wins by tour
- European Tour: 1
- Asian Tour: 5
- Other: 10

Best results in major championships
- Masters Tournament: DNP
- PGA Championship: DNP
- U.S. Open: DNP
- The Open Championship: CUT: 1997, 2005

Mardan Mamat (born 31 October 1967) is a Singaporean professional golfer.

== Career ==
In 1994, Mamat turned professional. Mamat plays on the Asian Tour, where he won for the first time at the 2004 Royal Challenge Indian Open. In 2006, he won the OSIM Singapore Masters, which was co-sanctioned by the Asian Tour and the European Tour. This made him the first player from Singapore to win a European Tour event, and earned him a two-year exemption into the European Tour.

Mamat was the first Singaporean to play in The Open Championship when he qualified in 1997. He has also won several minor professional tournaments and was a member of the winning Rest of Asia team at the 2005 Dynasty Cup.

== Personal life ==
Mamat is married and has five children. His son, Hairul Syirhan, is a goalkeeper at S.League club Geylang International.

== Amateur wins ==
- 1993 Putra Cup (Hong Kong, as individual and team)
- 1994 Malaysian Amateur Open

== Professional wins (15) ==
=== European Tour wins (1) ===
No.	Date	Tournament	Winning score	Margin of victory	Runner-up
1	12 Mar 2006	OSIM Singapore Masters^{1}	−12 (65-70-70-71=276)	1 stroke	(England) Nick Dougherty

^{1}Co-sanctioned by the Asian Tour

=== Asian Tour wins (5) ===
No.	Date	Tournament	Winning score	Margin of victory	Runner(s)-up
1	28 Mar 2004	Royal Challenge Indian Open	−18 (68-67-70-65=270)	5 strokes	(Mexico) Pablo del Olmo
2	12 Mar 2006	OSIM Singapore Masters^{1}	−12 (65-70-70-71=276)	1 stroke	(England) Nick Dougherty
3	12 Feb 2012	ICTSI Philippine Open	−8 (69-70-70-71=280)	5 strokes	(South Korea) Mo Joong-kyung
4	23 Nov 2014	Resorts World Manila Masters	−20 (65-68-66-69=268)	6 strokes	(France) Lionel Weber
5	30 May 2015	Bashundhara Bangladesh Open	−14 (66-67-68-69=270)	2 strokes	(India) Khalin Joshi, (South Korea) Lee Soo-min

^{1}Co-sanctioned by the European Tour

Asian Tour playoff record (0–1)

No.	Year	Tournament	Opponents	Result
1	2011	Panasonic Open (India)	(India) Manav Jaini, (India) Anirban Lahiri	Lahiri won with birdie on first extra hole

=== Asian Development Tour wins (1) ===
No.	Date	Tournament	Winning score	Margin of victory	Runner-up
1	11 Mar 2012	CCM Impian Masters^{1}	−18 (66-67-68-69=270)	1 stroke	(Malaysia) Rashid Ismail

^{1}Co-sanctioned by the Professional Golf of Malaysia Tour

=== ASEAN PGA Tour wins (4) ===
No.	Date	Tournament	Winning score	Margin of victory	Runner(s)-up
1	14 Mar 2009	Mercedes-Benz Masters Singapore	−14 (69-69-67-69=274)	3 strokes	(Thailand) Varut Chomchalam
2	21 Aug 2010	Mercedes-Benz Masters Malaysia	−13 (66-75-65-69=275)	Playoff	(Thailand) Pariya Junhasavasdikul
3	10 May 2013	A'Famosa Masters^{1}	−15 (69-69-65-70=273)	4 strokes	(Malaysia) Khor Kheng Hwai
4	17 Jan 2015 (2014 season)	Sabah Masters	−10 (69-66-71-68=274)	4 strokes	(Malaysia) Danny Chia, (Malaysia) Arie Irawan

^{1}Co-sanctioned by the Professional Golf of Malaysia Tour

=== Other wins (5) ===
- 1993 Singapore PGA Championship (as an amateur)
- 1994 Singapore PGA Championship (as an amateur)
- 1997 Emirates PGA Golf Championship (Singapore)
- 1998 Emirates PGA Golf Championship (Singapore)
- 2001 PFP Classic (Malaysia)

== Results in major championships ==
Tournament	1997	1998	1999
The Open Championship	CUT		

Tournament	2000	2001	2002	2003	2004	2005	2006	2007	2008	2009
The Open Championship						CUT				

Tournament	2010	2011	2012
The Open Championship			DQ

Note: Mamat only played in The Open Championship.

Did not play

CUT = missed the half-way cut
DQ = Disqualified

== Results in World Golf Championships ==
Tournament	2010
Match Play	
Championship	
Invitational	
Champions	76

Did not play

"T" = Tied

== Team appearances ==
Amateur

- Eisenhower Trophy (representing Singapore): 1992
- Putra Cup (Hong Kong): 1993 (winners)

Professional

- World Cup (representing Singapore): 2002, 2005, 2006, 2009, 2011
- Dynasty Cup (representing Asia): 2005 (winners)

== See also ==
- List of golfers with most Asian Tour wins
