= 2014 Asian Tour =

Golf tour season

2014 Asian Tour season
- Duration: 26 February 2014 – 21 December 2014
- Number of official events: 22
- Most wins: (India) Rashid Khan (2) (Note: Lee Westwood also won two events, but was not an Asian Tour member.) (India) Anirban Lahiri (2) (Thailand) Thaworn Wiratchant (2)
- Order of Merit: (United States) David Lipsky
- Players' Player of the Year: (India) Anirban Lahiri
- Rookie of the Year: (Australia) Cameron Smith

The 2014 Asian Tour was the 20th season of the modern Asian Tour (formerly the Asian PGA Tour), the main professional golf tour in Asia (outside of Japan) since it was established in 1995.

== Schedule ==
The following table lists official events during the 2014 season.

Date	Tournament	Host country	Purse (US$)	Winner (Note: The number in brackets after each winner's name is the number of Asian Tour events they had won up to and including that tournament. This information is only shown for Asian Tour members.)	OWGR points	Other tours (Note: EUR − European Tour; JPN − Japan Golf Tour; PGAT − PGA Tour; PGTI − Professional Golf Tour of India.)	Notes
1 Mar	SAIL-SBI Open	India	300,000	(India) Rashid Khan (1)	14	PGTI	
16 Mar	Solaire Open	Philippines	300,000	(Canada) Richard T. Lee (1)	14		
20 Apr	Maybank Malaysian Open	Malaysia	2,750,000	(England) Lee Westwood (n/a)	32	EUR	
27 Apr	CIMB Niaga Indonesian Masters	Indonesia	750,000	(India) Anirban Lahiri (4)	20		
4 May	The Championship at Laguna National	Singapore	1,500,000	(Chile) Felipe Aguilar (n/a)	22	EUR	
18 May	ICTSI Philippine Open	Philippines	300,000	(Australia) Marcus Both (3)	14		
8 Jun	Queen's Cup	Thailand	300,000	(Thailand) Thaworn Wiratchant (17)	14		
7 Sep	Omega European Masters	Switzerland	€2,300,000	(United States) David Lipsky (2)	30	EUR	
14 Sep	Yeangder Tournament Players Championship	Taiwan	500,000	(Thailand) Prom Meesawat (2)	14		
21 Sep	Worldwide Holdings Selangor Masters	Malaysia	RM1,300,000	(Thailand) Chapchai Nirat (4)	14		
28 Sep	Asia-Pacific Diamond Cup Golf	Japan	¥150,000,000	(Japan) Hiroyuki Fujita (n/a)	15	JPN	New to Asian Tour
5 Oct	Mercuries Taiwan Masters	Taiwan	650,000	(England) Steve Lewton (1)	14		
19 Oct	Hong Kong Open	Hong Kong	1,300,000	(Australia) Scott Hend (6)	19	EUR	
26 Oct	Venetian Macau Open	Macau	900,000	(India) Anirban Lahiri (5)	17		
2 Nov	CIMB Classic	Malaysia	7,000,000	(United States) Ryan Moore (n/a)	42	PGAT	Limited-field event
9 Nov	Panasonic Open India	India	300,000	(India) Shiv Chawrasia (3)	14	PGTI	
16 Nov	Chiangmai Golf Classic	Thailand	750,000	(India) Rashid Khan (2)	16		
23 Nov	Resorts World Manila Masters	Philippines	1,000,000	(Singapore) Mardan Mamat (4)	14		
30 Nov	King's Cup	Thailand	500,000	(Thailand) Thaworn Wiratchant (18)	14		
7 Dec	Bank BRI Indonesia Open	Indonesia	750,000	(Republic of Ireland) Pádraig Harrington (n/a)	14		
14 Dec	Thailand Golf Championship	Thailand	1,000,000	(England) Lee Westwood (n/a)	34		Flagship event
21 Dec	Dubai Open	UAE	500,000	(India) Arjun Atwal (8)	14		New tournament

== Order of Merit ==
The Order of Merit was based on prize money won during the season, calculated in U.S. dollars.

Position	Player	Prize money ($)
1	(United States) David Lipsky	713,902
2	(India) Anirban Lahiri	602,834
3	(Thailand) Prom Meesawat	532,471
4	(Australia) Scott Hend	428,820
5	(Australia) Cameron Smith	427,476

== Awards ==
Award	Winner	Ref.
Players' Player of the Year	(India) Anirban Lahiri	
Rookie of the Year	(Australia) Cameron Smith	

== See also ==
- 2014 Asian Development Tour
