= Solaire Open =

Tournament information
- Location: Manila, Philippines
- Established: 2013
- Course: Wack Wack Golf and Country Club
- Par: 71
- Length: 7,206 yards (6,589 m)
- Tour: Asian Tour
- Format: Stroke play
- Prize fund: US$300,000
- Month played: March
- Final year: 2014

Tournament record score
- Aggregate: 277 Richard T. Lee (2014)
- To par: −7 as above

Final champion
- (Canada) Richard T. Lee
- Location in the Philippines

The Solaire Open was a golf tournament on the Asian Tour. It was first played in 2013 at the Wack Wack Golf and Country Club (East course) in Manila, Philippines. The second and final event was held at The Country Club in Santa Rosa, Laguna, in the outskirts of Manila.

== Winners ==
Year	Winner	Score	To par	Margin of victory	Runner(s)-up
2014	(Canada) Richard T. Lee	277	−7	1 stroke	(Thailand) Chawalit Plaphol
2013	(Taiwan) Lin Wen-tang	285	−3	1 stroke	(Canada) Richard T. Lee (Thailand) Thammanoon Sriroj
