= Arnond Vongvanij =

Thai professional golfer (born 1988)

Personal information
- Nickname: Bank
- Nationality: Thailand; United States
- Born: 15 December 1988 (age 37) Hawaii, U.S.
- Height: 5 ft 5 in (1.65 m)
- Weight: 142 lb (64 kg; 10.1 st)

Career
- Sport: Golf
- College: University of Florida
- Turned professional: 2011
- Current tour: Asian Tour
- Professional wins: 1

Number of wins by tour
- Asian Tour: 1

Arnond Vongvanij (Thai: อานนท์ ว่องวานิช, born 15 December 1988) is a Thai American professional golfer.

== Early life and amateur career ==
In 1988, Vongvanij was born in Hawaii but grew up in Thailand. He moved to Florida at the age of 12 to play golf. He played college golf at the University of Florida where he won three times.

== Professional career ==
In 2011, Vongvanij turned professional. He began playing on the Asian Tour. He won his first title at the 2012 King's Cup.

== Amateur wins ==
- 2005 St. Augustine Amateur Classic
- 2006 Terra Cotta Invitational
- 2009 Eastern Amateur

== Professional wins (1) ==
=== Asian Tour wins (1) ===
No.	Date	Tournament	Winning score	Margin of victory	Runners-up
1	2 Dec 2012	King's Cup	−22 (65-70-67-64=266)	2 strokes	(Singapore) Mardan Mamat, (Thailand) Thaworn Wiratchant

Asian Tour playoff record (0–1)

No.	Year	Tournament	Opponent	Result
1	2017	Resorts World Manila Masters	(United States) Micah Lauren Shin	Lost to birdie on first extra hole

== U.S. national team appearances ==
Amateur

- Palmer Cup: 2011 (winners)
