= Thitiphun Chuayprakong =

Thai professional golfer

Personal information
- Nationality: Thailand
- Born: 15 July 1992 (age 34)
- Height: 5 ft 9 in (1.75 m)

Career
- Sport: Golf
- Turned professional: 2009
- Current tour: Asian Tour
- Professional wins: 3

Number of wins by tour
- Asian Tour: 1
- Other: 2

Best results in major championships
- Masters Tournament: DNP
- PGA Championship: DNP
- U.S. Open: CUT: 2016
- The Open Championship: DNP

Thitiphun Chuayprakong (Thai: ฐิติพันธ์ ช่วยประคอง; born 15 July 1992), also known as Thitipan Pachuayprakong, is a Thai professional golfer.

Chuayprakong has played on the Asian Tour since 2011. He picked up his first tour win at the 2016 Bashundhara Bangladesh Open. He also played in his first major that same year, the U.S. Open.

== Professional wins (3) ==
=== Asian Tour wins (1) ===
No.	Date	Tournament	Winning score	Margin of victory	Runner-up
1	13 Feb 2016	Bashundhara Bangladesh Open	−21 (65-66-65-67=263)	2 strokes	(Thailand) Sutijet Kooratanapisan

=== All Thailand Golf Tour wins (1) ===
- 2013 Singha Classic

=== Other wins (1) ===
- 2010 Singha All Thailand Challenge
