= 2013 Asian Tour =

Golf tour season

2013 Asian Tour season
- Duration: 21 February 2013 – 19 January 2014
- Number of official events: 24
- Most wins: (Australia) Scott Hend (3)
- Order of Merit: (Thailand) Kiradech Aphibarnrat
- Players' Player of the Year: (Thailand) Kiradech Aphibarnrat
- Rookie of the Year: (Canada) Richard T. Lee

The 2013 Asian Tour was the 19th season of the modern Asian Tour (formerly the Asian PGA Tour), the main professional golf tour in Asia (outside of Japan) since it was established in 1995.

== Schedule ==
The following table lists official events during the 2013 season.

Date	Tournament	Host country	Purse (US$)	Winner (Note: The number in brackets after each winner's name is the number of Asian Tour events they had won up to and including that tournament. This information is only shown for Asian Tour members.)	OWGR points	Other tours (Note: EUR − European Tour; JPN − Japan Golf Tour; KOR − Korean Tour; PGAT − PGA Tour; PGTI − Professional Golf Tour of India.)	Notes
24 Feb	Zaykabar Myanmar Open	Myanmar	300,000	(Thailand) Chawalit Plaphol (4)	14		
9 Mar	SAIL-SBI Open	India	300,000	(India) Anirban Lahiri (3)	14	PGTI	
17 Mar	Avantha Masters	India	€1,800,000	(South Africa) Thomas Aiken (n/a)	20	EUR	
24 Mar	Maybank Malaysian Open	Malaysia	2,750,000	(Thailand) Kiradech Aphibarnrat (2)	38	EUR	
31 Mar	Chiangmai Golf Classic	Thailand	750,000	(Australia) Scott Hend (3)	16		New tournament
7 Apr	Panasonic Open India	India	300,000	(Australia) Wade Ormsby (1)	14	PGTI	
14 Apr	Solaire Open	Philippines	300,000	(Taiwan) Lin Wen-tang (6)	14		New tournament
28 Apr	Ballantine's Championship	South Korea	€2,205,000	(Australia) Brett Rumford (n/a)	34	EUR, KOR	
5 May	CIMB Niaga Indonesian Masters	Indonesia	750,000	(Austria) Bernd Wiesberger (n/a)	14		
16 Jun	Queen's Cup	Thailand	300,000	(Thailand) Prayad Marksaeng (7)	14		
23 Jun	Worldwide Holdings Selangor Masters	Malaysia	RM1,200,000	(Thailand) Pariya Junhasavasdikul (2)	14		
8 Sep	Omega European Masters	Switzerland	€2,200,000	(Denmark) Thomas Bjørn (n/a)	30	EUR	
15 Sep	Yeangder Tournament Players Championship	Taiwan	500,000	(Thailand) Thaworn Wiratchant (16)	14		
29 Sep	Asia-Pacific Panasonic Open	Japan	¥150,000,000	(Japan) Masahiro Kawamura (n/a)	16	JPN	
6 Oct	Mercuries Taiwan Masters	Taiwan	600,000	(Australia) Scott Hend (4)	14		
13 Oct	CJ Invitational	South Korea	750,000	(South Korea) Kang Sung-hoon (1)	14	KOR	
20 Oct	Venetian Macau Open	Macau	800,000	(Australia) Scott Hend (5)	14		
28 Oct	CIMB Classic	Malaysia	7,000,000	(United States) Ryan Moore (n/a)	48	PGAT	Limited-field event
10 Nov	Hero Indian Open	India	1,250,000	(Bangladesh) Siddikur Rahman (2)	14		
17 Nov	Resorts World Manila Masters	Philippines	1,250,000	(China) Liang Wenchong (3)	14		
1 Dec	Indonesia Open	Indonesia	750,000	(India) Gaganjeet Bhullar (5)	14		
8 Dec	Hong Kong Open	Hong Kong	1,300,000	(Spain) Miguel Ángel Jiménez (7)	20	EUR	
15 Dec	Thailand Golf Championship	Thailand	1,000,000	(Spain) Sergio García (3)	38		Flagship event
19 Jan	King's Cup Golf Hua Hin	Thailand	1,000,000	(Thailand) Prayad Marksaeng (8)	14		

== Order of Merit ==
The Order of Merit was based on prize money won during the season, calculated in U.S. dollars.

Position	Player	Prize money ($)
1	(Thailand) Kiradech Aphibarnrat	1,127,856
2	(Australia) Scott Hend	597,901
3	(India) Anirban Lahiri	517,030
4	(Bangladesh) Siddikur Rahman	495,467
5	(India) Gaganjeet Bhullar	479,979

== Awards ==
Award	Winner	Ref.
Players' Player of the Year	(Thailand) Kiradech Aphibarnrat	
Rookie of the Year	(Canada) Richard T. Lee	

== See also ==
- 2013 Asian Development Tour
