= CIMB Classic =

Professional golf tournament in Malaysia

Coordinates: 3.139°N 101.640°E

Tournament information
- Location: Kuala Lumpur, Malaysia
- Established: 2010
- Courses: TPC Kuala Lumpur (West Course)
- Par: 72
- Length: 7,005 yards (6,405 m)
- Tours: Asian Tour; PGA Tour
- Format: Stroke play
- Prize fund: US$7,000,000
- Month played: October
- Final year: 2018

Tournament record score
- Aggregate: 261 Bo Van Pelt (2011)
- To par: −26 Justin Thomas (2015) −26 Marc Leishman (2018)

Final champion
- (Australia) Marc Leishman

Location map
- Location in Malaysia

The CIMB Classic was a professional golf tournament in Kuala Lumpur, Malaysia, co-sanctioned by the Asian Tour and the PGA Tour. Played in the fall, the event debuted in 2010 and moved to the West Course of the TPC Kuala Lumpur in 2013; the first three editions were played at The Mines Resort & Golf Club in Mines Wellness City. The event was replaced in the 2019–20 PGA Tour season by the Zozo Championship in Japan.

The tournament was the first event ever sanctioned by the PGA Tour in Southeast Asia. It was an official money event on the Asian Tour, but was an unofficial money event on the PGA Tour through 2012. Beginning in October 2013, it gained official status on the PGA Tour and the field was increased to 78 players. FedEx Cup points are earned by those making the cut, the winner earned a trip to the Masters. The purse was US$7 million, one of the highest in East Asia together with the WGC-HSBC Champions and the now defunct BMW Masters.

== Field ==
In 2010, the 40-man field consisted of the top 25 available players from the PGA Tour's FedEx Cup standings, the top 10 available from the Asian Tour's Order of Merit and 5 sponsors exemptions. In 2011, the field expanded to 48 players, 30 from the FedEx Cup standings, 10 from the Asian Tour's Order of Merit, and 8 sponsors exemptions. In 2013, the field expanded to 78, 60 from the FedEx Cup standings, 10 from the Asian Tour's Order of Merit, and 8 sponsors exemptions.

== Winners ==
Year	Tours (Note: ASA − Asian Tour; PGAT − PGA Tour.)	Winner	Score	To par	Margin of victory	Runner(s)-up	Purse (US$)	Winner's share ($)
CIMB Classic
2018	ASA, PGAT	(Australia) Marc Leishman	262	−26	5 strokes	(United States) Bronson Burgoon (Argentina) Emiliano Grillo (United States) Chesson Hadley	7,000,000	1,260,000
2017	ASA, PGAT	(United States) Pat Perez	264	−24	4 strokes	(United States) Keegan Bradley	7,000,000	1,260,000
2016	ASA, PGAT	(United States) Justin Thomas (2)	265	−23	3 strokes	(Japan) Hideki Matsuyama	7,000,000	1,260,000
2015	ASA, PGAT	(United States) Justin Thomas	262	−26	1 stroke	(Australia) Adam Scott	7,000,000	1,260,000
2014	ASA, PGAT	(United States) Ryan Moore (2)	271	−17	3 strokes	(Spain) Sergio García (United States) Kevin Na (United States) Gary Woodland	7,000,000	1,260,000
2013	ASA, PGAT	(United States) Ryan Moore	274	−14	Playoff	(United States) Gary Woodland	7,000,000	1,260,000
2012	ASA, PGAT (Note: Between 2010–2012, the event was sanctioned by the PGA Tour, however it was an unofficial money event; therefore wins in that period are considered unofficial on that tour.)	(United States) Nick Watney	262	−22	1 stroke	(United States) Robert Garrigus (United States) Bo Van Pelt	6,100,000	1,300,000
CIMB Asia Pacific Classic Malaysia
2011	ASA, PGAT	(United States) Bo Van Pelt	261	−23	1 stroke	(United States) Jeff Overton	6,100,000	1,300,000
2010	ASA, PGAT	(United States) Ben Crane	266	−18	1 stroke	(England) Brian Davis	6,000,000	1,000,000

Note: Green highlight indicates scoring records.
