= 2010 Asian Tour =

Golf tour season

2010 Asian Tour season
- Duration: 4 February 2010 – 19 December 2010
- Number of official events: 22
- Most wins: (Japan) Tetsuji Hiratsuka (3)
- Order of Merit: (South Korea) Noh Seung-yul
- Players' Player of the Year: (South Korea) Noh Seung-yul
- Rookie of the Year: (Sweden) Rikard Karlberg

The 2010 Asian Tour was the 16th season of the modern Asian Tour (formerly the Asian PGA Tour), the main professional golf tour in Asia (outside of Japan) since it was established in 1995.

== Schedule ==
The following table lists official events during the 2010 season.

Date	Tournament	Host country	Purse (US$)	Winner (Note: The number in brackets after each winner's name is the number of Asian Tour events they had won up to and including that tournament. This information is only shown for Asian Tour members.)	OWGR points	Other tours (Note: EUR − European Tour; JPN − Japan Golf Tour; KOR − Korean Tour; PGAT − PGA Tour.)	Notes
7 Feb	Asian Tour International	Thailand	300,000	(India) Gaganjeet Bhullar (2)	14		New tournament
14 Feb	Avantha Masters	India	€1,500,000	(Australia) Andrew Dodt (1)	20	EUR	New tournament
7 Mar	Maybank Malaysian Open	Malaysia	2,000,000	(South Korea) Noh Seung-yul (2)	24	EUR	
2 Apr	SAIL Open	India	300,000	(Sweden) Rikard Karlberg (1)	14		
11 Apr	Air Bagan Myanmar Open	Myanmar	300,000	(Japan) Tetsuji Hiratsuka (1)	14		
25 Apr	Ballantine's Championship	South Korea	€2,200,000	(Australia) Marcus Fraser (1)	38	EUR, KOR	
20 Jun	Queen's Cup	Thailand	300,000	(Japan) Tetsuji Hiratsuka (2)	14		
1 Aug	Brunei Open	Brunei	300,000	(Bangladesh) Siddikur Rahman (1)	14		
8 Aug	Worldwide Holdings Selangor Masters	Malaysia	RM1,200,000	(Philippines) Angelo Que (3)	14		
5 Sep	Omega European Masters	Switzerland	€2,000,000	(Spain) Miguel Ángel Jiménez (n/a)	30	EUR	
12 Sep	Handa Singapore Classic	Singapore	400,000	(South Africa) Peter Karmis (1)	14		New tournament
19 Sep	Yeangder Tournament Players Championship	Taiwan	300,000	(Thailand) Thaworn Wiratchant (12)	14		New tournament
26 Sep	Asia-Pacific Panasonic Open	Japan	¥150,000,000	(Australia) Brendan Jones (1)	22	JPN	
3 Oct	Mercuries Taiwan Masters	Taiwan	500,000	(Thailand) Pariya Junhasavasdikul (1)	14		
17 Oct	Iskandar Johor Open	Malaysia	1,250,000	(Republic of Ireland) Pádraig Harrington (n/a)	20		
31 Oct	CIMB Asia Pacific Classic Malaysia	Malaysia	6,000,000	(United States) Ben Crane (n/a)	38	PGAT (Note: PGA Tour unofficial event)	New limited-field event
14 Nov	Barclays Singapore Open	Singapore	6,000,000	(Australia) Adam Scott (n/a)	48	EUR	
21 Nov	UBS Hong Kong Open	Hong Kong	2,500,000	(England) Ian Poulter (n/a)	38	EUR	
28 Nov	King's Cup	Thailand	300,000	(Thailand) Udorn Duangdecha (1)	14		
5 Dec	Hero Honda Indian Open	India	1,250,000	(Sweden) Rikard Karlberg (2)	14		
12 Dec	Johnnie Walker Cambodian Open	Cambodia	300,000	(Thailand) Thongchai Jaidee (13)	14		
19 Dec	Black Mountain Masters	Thailand	600,000	(Japan) Tetsuji Hiratsuka (3)	20		

== Order of Merit ==
The Order of Merit was based on prize money won during the season, calculated in U.S. dollars.

Position	Player	Prize money ($)
1	(South Korea) Noh Seung-yul	822,361
2	(Australia) Marcus Fraser	610,927
3	(Sweden) Rikard Karlberg	594,857
4	(Australia) Andrew Dodt	393,042
5	(Japan) Tetsuji Hiratsuka	333,093

== Awards ==
Award	Winner	Ref.
Players' Player of the Year	(South Korea) Noh Seung-yul	
Rookie of the Year	(Sweden) Rikard Karlberg	
