= Scott Hend =

Australian professional golfer (born 1973)

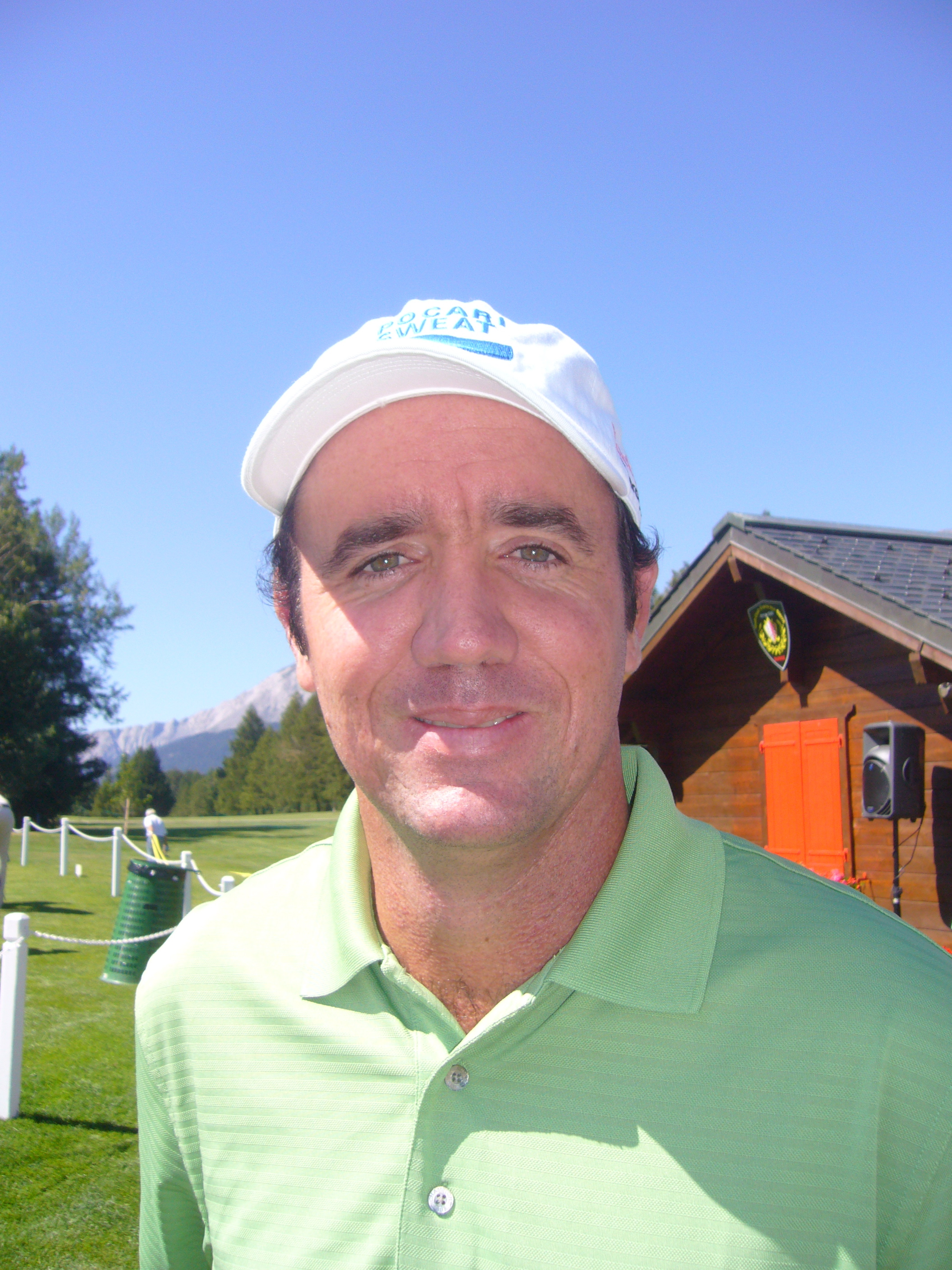

Personal information
- Full name: Scott Robert Hend
- Nationality: Australia
- Born: 1973 (age 52–53) Townsville, Queensland, Australia
- Height: 1.80 m (5 ft 11 in)
- Weight: 82 kg (181 lb; 12.9 st)
- Spouse: Leanne (m. 2002)

Career
- Sport: Golf
- Turned professional: 1997
- Current tours: PGA Tour Champions; European Senior Tour
- Former tours: PGA Tour; European Tour; Asian Tour; PGA Tour of Australasia; Canadian Tour; Von Nida Tour
- Professional wins: 19
- Highest ranking: 59 (25 December 2016)

Number of wins by tour
- European Tour: 3
- Asian Tour: 10 (Tied-4th all-time)
- PGA Tour Champions: 1
- European Senior Tour: 3
- Other: 5

Best results in major championships
- Masters Tournament: DNP
- PGA Championship: T42: 2016
- U.S. Open: T32: 2006
- The Open Championship: T54: 2017

Achievements and awards
- Von Nida Tour Order of Merit winner: 2003
- Asian Tour Rookie of the Year: 2007
- Asian Tour Order of Merit winner: 2016
- Asian Tour Players' Player of the Year: 2016
- European Senior Tour Order of Merit winner: 2025

Scott Robert Hend (born 1973) is an Australian professional golfer. He has played on a number of the world's main tours. He is renowned as a long hitter.

== Professional career ==
Hend turned professional in 1997. He joined the PGA Tour of Australasia later in the year. Hend has since played on most of the major golf tours around the world. He has won three times in Australia and was the inaugural winner of the Von Nida Tour Order of Merit in 2003. He has also won on the Canadian Tour at the 2002 Victoria Open.

Hend played on the United States-based PGA Tour in 2004 and 2005, having gained his card at qualifying school for both seasons. In 2005, he was the first foreign player to win the 'Long Drive' statistic on the PGA Tour. Hend's best PGA Tour finish was third at the 2004 BellSouth Classic.

Since 2007 he has played on the Asian Tour, winning for the first time in 2008 at the Indonesia President Invitational. He finished fourth on the Order of Merit in both 2007 and 2009, and in 2007 was named Rookie of the Year.

In June 2016, Hend won the Queen's Cup in Thailand by one stroke, for his ninth victory on the Asian Tour. This moved him up into a tie for third place on the all-time winners list, behind only Thaworn Wiratchant and Thongchai Jaidee. He went on to win the 2016 Asian Tour Order of Merit.

Hend won his third European Tour title in March 2019 at the Maybank Championship. This was also his tenth victory on the Asian Tour, in a co-sanctioned event. He won the event in a dramatic playoff with Nacho Elvira, making a birdie at the first extra hole.

=== Senior career ===
Hend turned 50 in August 2023 and joined the European Senior Tour. He won on his first start at the WINSTONgolf Senior Open. In 2025, he won twice on the European Senior Tour, claiming the season-long Order of Merit.

In May 2026, Hend won the Trophy Hassan II in Morocco. It was his first on the PGA Tour Champions.

== Awards and honors ==
- In 2003, Hend won the Von Nida Tour's Order of Merit.
- In 2007, he earned the Asian Tour's Rookie of the Year honors.
- In 2016, Hend won the Asian Tour's Order of Merit.
- In 2016, he was voted the Asian Tour's Players' Player of the Year.

== Professional wins (19) ==
=== European Tour wins (3) ===
No.	Date	Tournament	Winning score	Margin of victory	Runner-up
1	19 Oct 2014	Hong Kong Open^{1}	−13 (67-66-67-67=267)	Playoff	(Philippines) Angelo Que
2	13 Mar 2016	True Thailand Classic^{1}	−18 (68-64-70-68=270)	1 stroke	(Thailand) Piya Swangarunporn
3	24 Mar 2019	Maybank Championship^{1}	−15 (69-70-67-67=273)	Playoff	(Spain) Nacho Elvira

^{1}Co-sanctioned by the Asian Tour

European Tour playoff record (2–2)

No.	Year	Tournament	Opponent	Result
1	2014	Hong Kong Open	(Philippines) Angelo Que	Won with par on first extra hole
2	2016	Omega European Masters	(Sweden) Alex Norén	Lost to birdie on first extra hole
3	2017	Omega European Masters	(England) Matt Fitzpatrick	Lost to par on third extra hole
4	2019	Maybank Championship	(Spain) Nacho Elvira	Won with birdie on first extra hole

=== Asian Tour wins (10) ===
No.	Date	Tournament	Winning score	Margin of victory	Runner(s)-up
1	31 Aug 2008	Pertamina Indonesia President Invitational	−16 (71-69-66-66=272)	3 strokes	(Taiwan) Lin Wen-tang
2	8 Apr 2012	ISPS Handa Singapore Classic	−11 (67-68-64=199) (Note: Shortened to 54 holes due to weather.)	1 stroke	(Spain) Javier Colomo, (United States) David Lipsky, (Taiwan) Lu Wei-chih, (Sri Lanka) Mithun Perera
3	31 Mar 2013	Chiangmai Golf Classic	−20 (68-69-67-64=268)	3 strokes	(South Africa) Bryce Easton
4	6 Oct 2013	Mercuries Taiwan Masters	−3 (69-72-70-74=285)	4 strokes	(United States) Sam Cyr
5	20 Oct 2013	Venetian Macau Open	−16 (74-64-63-67=268)	3 strokes	(India) Anirban Lahiri
6	19 Oct 2014	Hong Kong Open^{1}	−13 (67-66-67-67=267)	Playoff	(Philippines) Angelo Que
7	18 Oct 2015	Venetian Macau Open (2)	−20 (66-68-64-66=264)	3 strokes	(India) Chiragh Kumar, (India) Anirban Lahiri
8	13 Mar 2016	True Thailand Classic^{1}	−18 (68-64-70-68=270)	1 stroke	(Thailand) Piya Swangarunporn
9	19 Jun 2016	Queen's Cup	−15 (69-69-64-67=269)	1 stroke	(Thailand) Gunn Charoenkul
10	24 Mar 2019	Maybank Championship^{1}	−15 (69-70-67-67=273)	Playoff	(Spain) Nacho Elvira

^{1}Co-sanctioned by the European Tour

Asian Tour playoff record (2–2)

No.	Year	Tournament	Opponent	Result
1	2014	Hong Kong Open	(Philippines) Angelo Que	Won with par on first extra hole
2	2016	Omega European Masters	(Sweden) Alex Norén	Lost to birdie on first extra hole
3	2017	Omega European Masters	(England) Matt Fitzpatrick	Lost to par on third extra hole
4	2019	Maybank Championship	(Spain) Nacho Elvira	Won with birdie on first extra hole

=== Von Nida Tour wins (2) ===
No.	Date	Tournament	Winning score	Margin of victory	Runner-up
1	23 Mar 2003	Toyota Southern Classic	−12 (69-64-70-65=268)	Playoff	(Australia) Craig Carmichael
2	2 Nov 2003	QLD Group Queensland Open	−13 (68-70-70-67=275)	2 strokes	(Australia) Matthew Millar

=== Australasian Development Tour wins (1) ===
No.	Date	Tournament	Winning score	Margin of victory	Runners-up
1	22 Oct 2000	Toyota Southern Classic	−14 (68-64-71-63=266)	2 strokes	(Australia) Paul Marantz, (Australia) Andre Stolz

=== Canadian Tour wins (1) ===
No.	Date	Tournament	Winning score	Margin of victory	Runners-up
1	7 Jul 2002	Victoria Open	−17 (65-70-65-63=263)	3 strokes	(United States) Michael Harris, (Canada) David Hearn, (United States) Rich Massey

=== Foundation Tour wins (1) ===
- 1999 South Australian PGA Championship

=== PGA Tour Champions wins (1) ===
No.	Date	Tournament	Winning score	Margin of victory	Runners-up
1	23 May 2026	Trophy Hassan II	−15 (66-69-69=204)	5 strokes	(New Zealand) Steven Alker, (United States) Tommy Gainey

=== European Senior Tour wins (3) ===
No.	Date	Tournament	Winning score	Margin of victory	Runner(s)-up
1	17 Sep 2023	WINSTONgolf Senior Open	−10 (70-70-66=206)	1 stroke	(England) Phillip Archer, (England) Peter Baker
2	27 Apr 2025	Barbados Legends	−11 (69-69-64=202)	2 strokes	(England) Greg Owen
3	7 Sep 2025	European Legends Cup	−16 (70-63-67=200)	2 strokes	(Brazil) Adilson da Silva

European Senior Tour playoff record (0–1)

No.	Year	Tournament	Opponent	Result
1	2024	Barbados Legends	(England) Peter Baker	Lost to birdie on first extra hole

== Results in major championships ==
Results not in chronological order in 2020.

Tournament	2004	2005	2006	2007	2008	2009
Masters Tournament						
U.S. Open	CUT		T32			
The Open Championship		CUT				
PGA Championship						

Tournament	2010	2011	2012	2013	2014	2015	2016	2017	2018
Masters Tournament									
U.S. Open		CUT							
The Open Championship						CUT	T72	T54	
PGA Championship							T42	CUT	

Tournament	2019	2020
Masters Tournament		
PGA Championship		
U.S. Open		CUT
The Open Championship		NT

Did not play

CUT = missed the half-way cut
"T" = tied for place
NT = No tournament due to COVID-19 pandemic

== Results in World Golf Championships ==
Results not in chronological order before 2015.

Tournament	2012	2013	2014	2015	2016	2017	2018	2019	2020
Championship			T16		63	T65			65
Match Play									NT^{1}
Invitational						T10			
Champions	T24	T21		T19	T54	T62		T28	NT^{1}

^{1}Cancelled due to COVID-19 pandemic

Top 10
Did not play

NT = no tournament
"T" = tied

== See also ==
- 2003 PGA Tour Qualifying School graduates
- 2004 PGA Tour Qualifying School graduates
- List of golfers with most Asian Tour wins
