= Chinnaswamy Muniyappa =

Indian professional golfer (born 1977)

Personal information
- Nationality: India
- Born: 1 January 1977 (age 49) India

Career
- Sport: Golf
- Turned professional: 1997
- Current tour: Asian Tour
- Professional wins: 2

Number of wins by tour
- Asian Tour: 1

Achievements and awards
- Asian Tour Rookie of the Year: 2009

Chinnaswamy Muniyappa (born 1 January 1977) is an Indian professional golfer.

== Career ==
in 1997, Muniyappa turned professional. He has won once on the Asian Tour.

== Professional wins (2) ==
=== Asian Tour wins (1) ===
No.	Date	Tournament	Winning score	Margin of victory	Runner-up
1	11 Oct 2009	Hero Honda Indian Open	−12 (66-69-71-70=276)	Playoff	(South Korea) Lee Sung

Asian Tour playoff record (1–0)

No.	Year	Tournament	Opponent	Result
1	2009	Hero Honda Indian Open	(South Korea) Lee Sung	Won with birdie on first extra hole

=== Professional Golf Tour of India wins (1) ===
No.	Date	Tournament	Winning score	Margin of victory	Runner-up
1	8 Nov 2008	Toyota Altis Open	−19 (67-66-70-66=269)	3 strokes	(Australia) Kunal Bhasin

== Results in World Golf Championships ==
Tournament	2009
Match Play	
Championship	
Invitational	
Champions	T74

Did not play

"T" = Tied
