= Mithun Perera =

Sri Lankan golfer

Personal information
- Full name: K. Mithun Chamika Udayanga Perera
- Nationality: Sri Lanka
- Born: 26 December 1986 (age 39) Boralla, Sri Lanka
- Height: 5 ft 4 in (1.63 m)
- Weight: 155 lb (70 kg; 11.1 st)
- Spouse: Sudeshi Fernando
- Children: 2

Career
- Sport: Golf
- Turned professional: 2011
- Current tour: Asian Tour
- Professional wins: 7

K. Mithun Chamika Udayanga Perera (born 26 December 1986) is a Sri Lankan golfer.

== Early life and amateur career ==
In 1986, Perera was born in Sri Lanka. His father, Nandasena Perera, was also a notable golfer.

As an amateur, Perera won the Sri Lanka Amateur three times as well as other Asian amateur events. He represented Sri Lanka in the 2006 and 2010 Asian Games and the 2010 South Asian Games.

== Professional career ==
Perera turned professional in 2011 and currently plays on the Professional Golf Tour of India and the Asian Tour. He is the first Sri Lankan to have full card in Asian Tour and the first Sri Lankan to have multiple wins on the Indian Tour. He has been runner-up three times on the Asian Tour; at the 2012 ISPS Handa Singapore Classic, the 2013 Zaykabar Myanmar Open and the 2014 Panasonic Open India, where he lost in a three-man playoff.

== Amateur wins ==
- 2006 Sri Lanka Amateur
- 2007 SAARC Golf Championship, Eastern India Amateur
- 2008 Sri Lanka Amateur
- 2009 Asia-Pacific Open Amateur, Surya Nepal Amateur Golf Championship
- 2010 Kurnia Saujana Championship, Sri Lanka Amateur

== Professional wins (7) ==
=== Professional Golf Tour of India wins (7) ===
No.	Date	Tournament	Winning score	Margin of victory	Runner(s)-up
1	8 Oct 2011	Haryana Open	−18 (68-66-64-72=270)	1 stroke	(India) Ashok Kumar
2	18 Aug 2012	Standard Chartered Open	−13 (67-67-73-65=271)	1 stroke	(India) Rashid Khan, (India) Sanjay Kumar
3	25 Nov 2012	Tata Open	−11 (65-72-67-70=274)	1 stroke	(India) Vinod Kumar
4	9 Feb 2014	Standard Chartered Open	−22 (63-68-65-66=262)	3 strokes	(Sri Lanka) Nadaraja Thangaraja
5	15 Feb 2014	Eagleburg Open	−22 (65-66-64-71=266)	3 strokes	(India) Anirban Lahiri
6	4 Mar 2018	Chennai Open Golf Championship	−14 (68-63-65-70=266)	1 stroke	(India) Mukesh Kumar, (India) Digvijay Singh
7	15 Dec 2019	ICC RCGC Open Golf Championship	−8 (71-70-67-72=280)	1 stroke	(India) Sanjeev Kumar

== Playoff record ==
Asian Tour playoff record (0–1)

No.	Year	Tournament	Opponents	Result
1	2014	Panasonic Open India	(India) Shiv Chawrasia, (India) Rahil Gangjee	Chawrasia won with birdie on first extra hole
