= Jyoti Randhawa =

Indian professional golfer (born 1972)

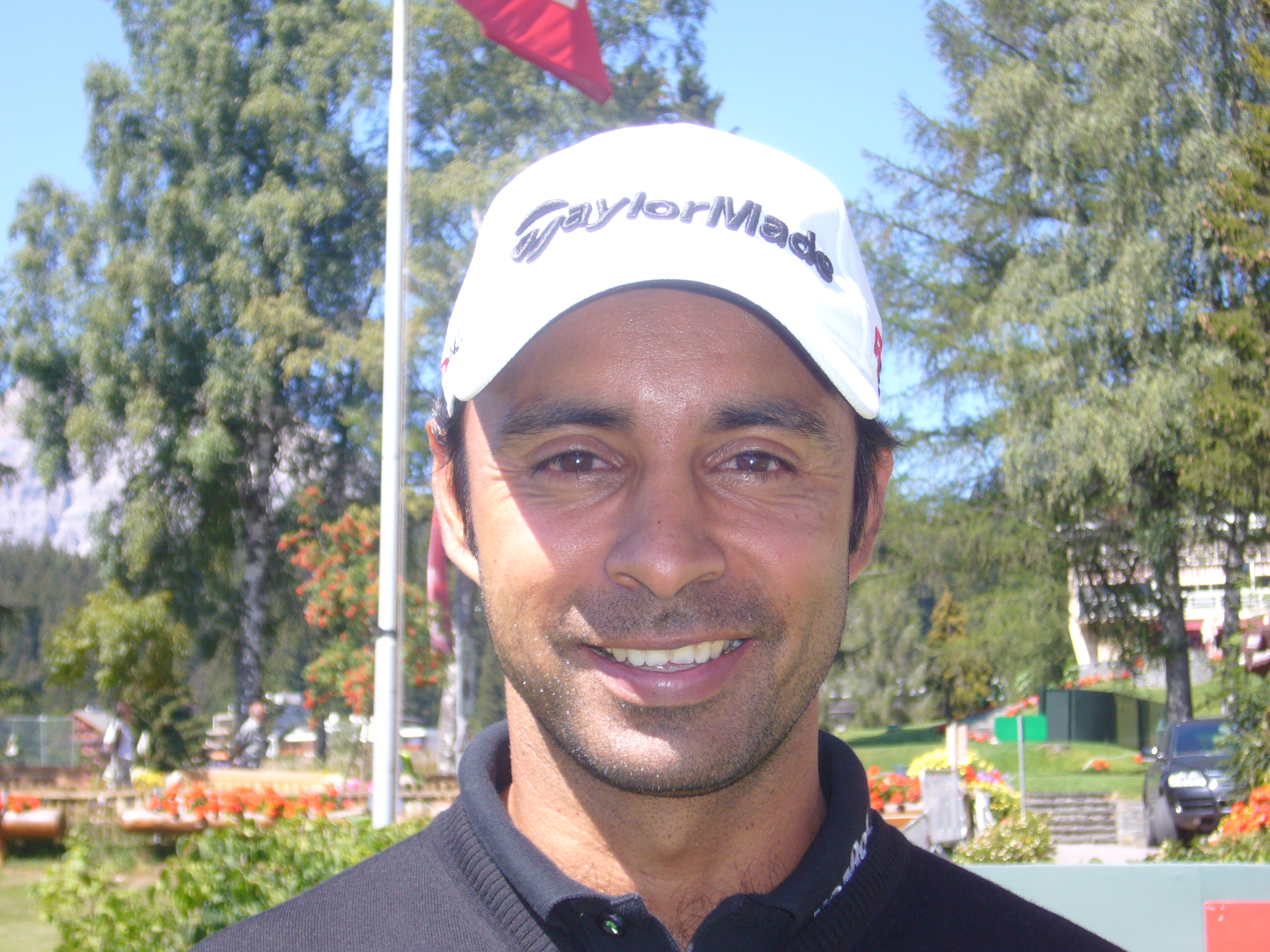

Personal information
- Full name: Jyotinder Singh Randhawa
- Nationality: India
- Born: 4 May 1972 (age 54) New Delhi, India
- Height: 6 ft 1 in (185 cm)
- Weight: 185 lb (84 kg; 13.2 st)
- Spouse: Chitrangada Singh (m. 2001; div. 2014)
- Children: 1

Career
- Sport: Golf
- Turned professional: 1994
- Current tour: European Senior Tour
- Former tours: European Tour; Asian Tour; Professional Golf Tour of India
- Professional wins: 23
- Highest ranking: 70 (16 March 2008)

Number of wins by tour
- Japan Golf Tour: 1
- Asian Tour: 8 (Tied-6th all-time)
- Other: 14

Best results in major championships
- Masters Tournament: DNP
- PGA Championship: CUT: 2008
- U.S. Open: CUT: 2006
- The Open Championship: T27: 2004

Achievements and awards
- Asian PGA Tour Order of Merit winner: 2002
- Asian PGA Tour Players' Player of the Year: 2002

Jyotinder Singh Randhawa (born 4 May 1972) is an Indian professional golfer. He plays on the Asian Tour where he won eight times between 1998 and 2009. He was ranked in the top 100 of the Official World Golf Ranking several times between 2004 and 2009.

== Professional career ==
In 1994, Randhawa turned professional. He played on the Asian Tour, having played on the European Tour from 2005 to 2010. In 2002, he finished top on the Asian Tour money list. He has finished second on the European Tour three times; the 2002 BMW Asian Open, the 2004 Johnnie Walker Classic and the 2007 Open de España.

== Personal life ==
Randhawa was married to actress Chitrangada Singh. Their son is named Zorawar Randhawa. The couple divorced in April 2014 and their son's custody has been granted to Chitrangada.

He was arrested in connection with poaching of endangered animals and birds in Katarniaghat wildlife sanctuary on 26 December 2018.

== Professional wins (23) ==
=== Japan Golf Tour wins (1) ===
No.	Date	Tournament	Winning score	Margin of victory	Runner-up
1	14 Sep 2003	Suntory Open	−8 (68-68-71-69=276)	2 strokes	(Australia) Paul Sheehan

=== Asian Tour wins (8) ===
No.	Date	Tournament	Winning score	Margin of victory	Runner(s)-up
1	8 Nov 1998	Hero Honda Masters	−13 (69-67-73-66=275)	4 strokes	(India) Jeev Milkha Singh
2	31 Oct 1999	Hero Honda Masters (2)	−11 (69-69-69-70=277)	1 stroke	(South Africa) Sammy Daniels
3	19 Mar 2000	Wills Indian Open	−15 (66-68-70-69=273)	Playoff	(South Africa) Sammy Daniels
4	10 Dec 2000	Singapore Open	−20 (72-64-65-67=268)	3 strokes	(South Africa) Hendrik Buhrmann
5	12 Dec 2004	Volvo Masters of Asia	−14 (63-70-74-67=274)	Playoff	(Australia) Terry Pilkadaris
6	23 Oct 2006	Hero Honda Indian Open (2)	−18 (69-67-64-70=270)	Playoff	(India) Shiv Chawrasia, (India) Vijay Kumar
7	14 Oct 2007	Hero Honda Indian Open (3)	−13 (70-69-67-69=275)	3 strokes	(Taiwan) Chang Tse-peng
8	8 Mar 2009	Singha Thailand Open	−17 (68-68-62-65=263)	2 strokes	(Wales) Rhys Davies

Asian Tour playoff record (3–0)

No.	Year	Tournament	Opponent(s)	Result
1	2000	Wills Indian Open	(South Africa) Sammy Daniels	Won with par on second extra hole
2	2004	Volvo Masters of Asia	(Australia) Terry Pilkadaris	Won with birdie on second extra hole
3	2006	Hero Honda Indian Open	(India) Shiv Chawrasia, (India) Vijay Kumar	Won with birdie on second extra hole Kumar eliminated by par on first hole

=== Professional Golf Tour of India wins (8) ===
No.	Date	Tournament	Winning score	Margin of victory	Runner(s)-up
1	29 Oct 2006	BILT Open	−15 (66-70-68-69=273)	3 strokes	(Singapore) Lam Chih Bing
2	8 Apr 2007	AIS Golf Open	−22 (72-67-63-64=266)	7 strokes	(India) Ashok Kumar
3	13 May 2007	DLF Masters	−15 (68-64-71-70=273)	10 strokes	(India) Shiv Kapur
4	21 Sep 2008	DLF Masters (2)	−8 (72-68-69-71=280)	1 stroke	(India) Mukesh Kumar
5	28 Dec 2008	BILT Open (2)	−19 (68-69-68-64=269)	1 stroke	(India) Anirban Lahiri, (India) Jeev Milkha Singh
6	26 Aug 2011	PGTI Players Championship (Classic)	−11 (69-66-70-72=277)	1 stroke	(India) Manav Jaini
7	10 Dec 2011	CG Open	−18 (67-65-66-64=262)	4 strokes	(India) Rahil Gangjee
8	24 Mar 2012	PGTI Players Championship (Noida)	−2 (71-73-70-72=286)	Playoff	(India) Mukesh Kumar

=== Other wins (6) ===
- 1999 Wills Southern Open
- 2000 Xerox Open, Honda Siel Nike-PGA Cship, SRF Open
- 2003 Kashmir Open
- 2005 Hero Honda Open South

== Results in major championships ==
Tournament	2000	2001	2002	2003	2004	2005	2006	2007	2008
U.S. Open							CUT		
The Open Championship	CUT			CUT	T27				
PGA Championship								WD	CUT

Note: Randhawa never played in the Masters Tournament.

Did not play

CUT = missed the half-way cut
WD = withdrew
"T" = tied

== Results in World Golf Championships ==
Tournament	2003	2004	2005	2006	2007	2008	2009
Match Play							
Championship	T54		T51	T17			
Invitational			70				
Champions							T19

Did not play

"T" = Tied
Note that the HSBC Champions did not become a WGC event until 2009.

== Team appearances ==
Amateur

- Eisenhower Trophy (representing India): 1992

Professional

- Alfred Dunhill Cup (representing India): 1999
- Dynasty Cup (representing Asia): 2003 (winners), 2005 (winners)
- World Cup (representing India): 2005, 2007, 2008, 2009
- Royal Trophy (representing Asia): 2006

== See also ==
- List of golfers with most Asian Tour wins
