= Panasonic Open (India) =

Panasonic Open India
Tournament information
- Location: Gurgaon, India
- Established: 2011
- Courses: Classic Golf and Country Club
- Par: 72
- Length: 7,114 yards (6,505 m)
- Tours: Asian Tour; Professional Golf Tour of India
- Format: Stroke play
- Prize fund: US$400,000
- Month played: November
- Final year: 2019

Tournament record score
- Aggregate: 271 Shiv Kapur (2017); 271 Khalin Joshi (2018)
- To par: −17 as above

Final champion
- (South Korea) Tom Kim
- Location in India Location in Haryana

The Panasonic Open India was a golf tournament on the Asian Tour. It was first played in 2011.

== Winners ==
Year	Tours (Note: ASA − Asian Tour; PGTI − Professional Golf Tour of India.)	Winner	Score	To par	Margin of victory	Runner(s)-up
Panasonic Open India
2019	ASA, PGTI	(South Korea) Tom Kim	203 (Note: Shortened to 54 holes due to weather.)	−13	1 stroke	(India) S. Chikkarangappa (India) Shiv Kapur
2018	ASA, PGTI	(India) Khalin Joshi	271	−17	1 stroke	(Bangladesh) Siddikur Rahman
2017	ASA, PGTI	(India) Shiv Kapur	271	−17	3 strokes	(India) Shiv Chawrasia (India) Om Prakash Chouhan (India) Karandeep Kochhar (India) Chiragh Kumar (United States) Paul Peterson (India) Ajeetesh Sandhu (India) Sudhir Sharma
2016	ASA, PGTI	(India) Mukesh Kumar	206	−10	1 stroke	(India) Rashid Khan (India) Jyoti Randhawa
2015	ASA, PGTI	(India) Chiragh Kumar	275	−13	3 strokes	(Bangladesh) Siddikur Rahman (Thailand) Thaworn Wiratchant
2014	ASA, PGTI	(India) Shiv Chawrasia	276	−12	Playoff	(India) Rahil Gangjee (Sri Lanka) Mithun Perera
2013	ASA, PGTI	(Australia) Wade Ormsby	279	−9	1 stroke	(Thailand) Boonchu Ruangkit
2012	ASA, PGTI	(India) Digvijay Singh	277	−11	2 strokes	(India) Gaganjeet Bhullar (Bangladesh) Siddikur Rahman
Panasonic Open (India)
2011	ASA, PGTI	(India) Anirban Lahiri	275	−13	Playoff	(India) Manav Jaini (Singapore) Mardan Mamat
