= 2006–07 Professional Golf Tour of India =

Golf tour season

2006–07 Professional Golf Tour of India season
- Duration: 26 October 2006 – 17 June 2007
- Number of official events: 10
- Most wins: (India) Ashok Kumar (5)
- Order of Merit: (India) Ashok Kumar

The 2006–07 Professional Golf Tour of India was the inaugural season of the Professional Golf Tour of India, the main professional golf tour in India since it was formed in 2006.

== Schedule ==
The following table lists official events during the 2006–07 season.

Date	Tournament	Location	Purse (₹)	Winner (Note: The number in brackets after each winner's name is the number of Professional Golf Tour of India events they had won up to and including that tournament.)
29 Oct	BILT Open	Karnataka	7,000,000	(India) Jyoti Randhawa (1)
10 Nov	Tata Open	Jharkhand	2,000,000	(India) Shiv Chawrasia (1)
22 Dec	Emaar-MGF PGTI Championship	Karnataka	5,000,000	(India) Harmeet Kahlon (1)
3 Feb	IndianOil XtraPremium Masters	Assam	2,000,000	(India) Ashok Kumar (1)
25 Feb	Solaris Global Green Open	Karnataka	6,000,000	(India) Ashok Kumar (2)
17 Mar	SRF All India Matchplay Championship	Uttar Pradesh	2,000,000	(India) Ashok Kumar (3)
8 Apr	AIS Golf Open	Delhi	6,000,000	(India) Jyoti Randhawa (2)
6 May	CG Open	Maharashtra	7,000,000	(India) Ashok Kumar (4)
13 May	DLF Masters	Haryana	6,500,000	(India) Jyoti Randhawa (3)
17 Jun	Color Plus Open	Haryana	2,500,000	(India) Ashok Kumar (5)

== Order of Merit ==
The Order of Merit was based on prize money won during the season, calculated in Indian rupees.

Position	Player	Prize money (₹)
1	(India) Ashok Kumar	4,417,875
2	(India) Jyoti Randhawa	3,159,000
3	(India) Shiv Chawrasia	2,275,750
4	(India) Digvijay Singh	1,566,645
5	(India) Gaganjeet Bhullar	1,537,100
