= Golf at the 2006 Asian Games – Men's individual =

Men's individual at the 2006 Asian Games
- Venue: Doha Golf Club
- Date: 8 December 2006 – 11 December 2006
- Competitors: 69 from 18 nations

Medalists
| gold medal | Kim Kyung-tae | South Korea |
| silver medal | Pan Cheng-tsung | Chinese Taipei |
| bronze medal | Michael Bibat | Philippines |

The men's individual competition at the 2006 Asian Games in Doha was held from 8 December to 11 December at the Doha Golf Club. The men played at 7181 yards with a par 72.

== Schedule ==
All times are Arabia Standard Time (UTC+03:00)

| Date | Time | Event |
|---|---|---|
| Friday, 8 December 2006 | 07:00 | 1st round |
| Saturday, 9 December 2006 | 07:00 | 2nd round |
| Sunday, 10 December 2006 | 07:00 | 3rd round |
| Monday, 11 December 2006 | 07:00 | Final round |

== Results ==
| Rank | Athlete | Round | | | | Total | To par |
| Rank | Athlete | 1 | 2 | 3 | 4 | Total | To par |
|---|---|---|---|---|---|---|---|
| 1st place, gold medalist(s) | Kim Kyung-tae (KOR) | 68 | 71 | 67 | 70 | 276 | −12 |
| 2nd place, silver medalist(s) | Pan Cheng-tsung (TPE) | 66 | 71 | 68 | 72 | 277 | −11 |
| 3rd place, bronze medalist(s) | Michael Bibat (PHI) | 70 | 72 | 67 | 70 | 279 | −9 |
| 4 | Choo Tze Huang (SIN) | 70 | 70 | 69 | 70 | 279 | −9 |
| 5 | Kim Do-hoon 752 (KOR) | 69 | 65 | 73 | 72 | 279 | −9 |
| 6 | Kang Sung-hoon (KOR) | 68 | 72 | 68 | 73 | 281 | −7 |
| 7 | Gaganjeet Bhullar (IND) | 70 | 70 | 70 | 73 | 283 | −5 |
| 7 | Yuta Ikeda (JPN) | 70 | 70 | 70 | 73 | 283 | −5 |
| 9 | Ben Leong (MAS) | 69 | 70 | 74 | 71 | 284 | −4 |
| 9 | Yuki Ito (JPN) | 68 | 70 | 71 | 75 | 284 | −4 |
| 11 | Chiragh Kumar (IND) | 71 | 71 | 71 | 72 | 285 | −3 |
| 11 | Chiang Chen-chih (TPE) | 70 | 69 | 74 | 72 | 285 | −3 |
| 11 | Hu Mu (CHN) | 72 | 74 | 66 | 73 | 285 | −3 |
| 14 | Anirban Lahiri (IND) | 69 | 73 | 72 | 72 | 286 | −2 |
| 14 | Jay Bayron (PHI) | 68 | 74 | 70 | 74 | 286 | −2 |
| 16 | Pavit Tangkamolprasert (THA) | 71 | 76 | 70 | 71 | 288 | E |
| 16 | Jonathan Leong (SIN) | 74 | 71 | 70 | 73 | 288 | E |
| 18 | Siddikur Rahman (BAN) | 71 | 71 | 72 | 76 | 290 | +2 |
| 18 | Yuki Usami (JPN) | 70 | 72 | 72 | 76 | 290 | +2 |
| 18 | Joseph Chakola (IND) | 73 | 70 | 70 | 77 | 290 | +2 |
| 21 | Kim Do-hoon 753 (KOR) | 69 | 73 | 75 | 74 | 291 | +3 |
| 21 | Siva Chandhran Supramaniam (MAS) | 72 | 71 | 73 | 75 | 291 | +3 |
| 23 | Wu Ashun (CHN) | 73 | 72 | 75 | 72 | 292 | +4 |
| 23 | Nakarintra Ratanakul (THA) | 74 | 74 | 70 | 74 | 292 | +4 |
| 23 | Naoyuki Tamura (JPN) | 73 | 75 | 70 | 74 | 292 | +4 |
| 23 | Nasser Mubarak (BRN) | 72 | 77 | 68 | 75 | 292 | +4 |
| 27 | Hamed Farhan (BRN) | 76 | 76 | 70 | 71 | 293 | +5 |
| 28 | Chan Shih-chang (TPE) | 69 | 70 | 77 | 78 | 294 | +6 |
| 29 | Kandasamy Prabagaran (SRI) | 75 | 73 | 74 | 73 | 295 | +7 |
| 29 | Anujit Hirunratanakorn (THA) | 71 | 79 | 71 | 74 | 295 | +7 |
| 31 | Shukree Othman (MAS) | 73 | 73 | 77 | 73 | 296 | +8 |
| 31 | Mithun Perera (SRI) | 73 | 75 | 73 | 75 | 296 | +8 |
| 31 | Muhammad Ali Hai (PAK) | 71 | 76 | 74 | 75 | 296 | +8 |
| 34 | Gene Bondoc (PHI) | 74 | 76 | 75 | 72 | 297 | +9 |
| 34 | Wu Kangchun (CHN) | 73 | 75 | 74 | 75 | 297 | +9 |
| 34 | Nguyễn Văn Thống (VIE) | 75 | 77 | 69 | 76 | 297 | +9 |
| 37 | Marvin Dumandan (PHI) | 73 | 73 | 74 | 78 | 298 | +10 |
| 38 | Vincent Khua (SIN) | 72 | 75 | 72 | 80 | 299 | +11 |
| 39 | Vaqas Ahmed (PAK) | 75 | 73 | 74 | 78 | 300 | +12 |
| 39 | Edmund Au (MAS) | 72 | 75 | 75 | 78 | 300 | +12 |
| 41 | Pan Fu-Chiang (TPE) | 76 | 77 | 73 | 76 | 302 | +14 |
| 41 | Tissa Chandradasa (SRI) | 75 | 77 | 73 | 77 | 302 | +14 |
| 43 | Varan Israbhakdi (THA) | 78 | 74 | 71 | 81 | 304 | +16 |
| 44 | Fan Zhipeng (CHN) | 73 | 78 | 72 | 82 | 305 | +17 |
| 45 | Ali Hammoud (LIB) | 79 | 75 | 79 | 73 | 306 | +18 |
| 45 | Shivaram Shrestha (NEP) | 78 | 77 | 73 | 78 | 306 | +18 |
| 47 | Amrit de Soysa (SRI) | 80 | 76 | 74 | 77 | 307 | +19 |
| 48 | Justin Han (SIN) | 75 | 74 | 79 | 80 | 308 | +20 |
| 49 | Abdulla Mubarak (BRN) | 76 | 82 | 77 | 74 | 309 | +21 |
| 49 | Yelamber Singh Adhikari (NEP) | 80 | 71 | 77 | 81 | 309 | +21 |
| 51 | Rachid Akl (LIB) | 78 | 80 | 77 | 75 | 310 | +22 |
| 52 | Trần Lê Duy Nhất (VIE) | 79 | 79 | 71 | 82 | 311 | +23 |
| 53 | Adnan Hammoud (LIB) | 81 | 76 | 76 | 80 | 313 | +25 |
| 54 | Tariq Mehmood (PAK) | 78 | 78 | 81 | 80 | 317 | +29 |
| 54 | Chan Sio Peng (MAC) | 81 | 74 | 80 | 82 | 317 | +29 |
| 56 | Nguyễn Thái Dương (VIE) | 81 | 84 | 80 | 73 | 318 | +30 |
| 56 | Abdulaziz Al-Buainen (QAT) | 79 | 82 | 80 | 77 | 318 | +30 |
| 58 | Mehdi Ramadan (LIB) | 80 | 75 | 84 | 80 | 319 | +31 |
| 59 | Trịnh Văn Thọ (VIE) | 79 | 83 | 79 | 79 | 320 | +32 |
| 59 | Muhammad Safdar Khan (PAK) | 78 | 78 | 84 | 80 | 320 | +32 |
| 61 | Daij Mubarak (BRN) | 84 | 81 | 75 | 81 | 321 | +33 |
| 62 | Adel Saeedan Al-Hamad (QAT) | 77 | 84 | 85 | 79 | 325 | +37 |
| 63 | Tariq Abu-Mooza (QAT) | 76 | 83 | 86 | 82 | 327 | +39 |
| 64 | Chuda Bahadur Bhandari (NEP) | 82 | 82 | 83 | 82 | 329 | +41 |
| 65 | Leung Kam Hung (MAC) | 82 | 79 | 88 | 86 | 335 | +47 |
| 66 | Tashi Ghale (NEP) | 86 | 86 | 82 | 85 | 339 | +51 |
| 67 | Abdulaziz Al-Bishi (QAT) | 85 | 85 | 88 | 90 | 348 | +60 |
| 68 | João de Senna Fernandes (MAC) | 93 | 89 | 90 | 81 | 353 | +65 |
| 69 | Tang Kam Pui (MAC) | 88 | 96 | 93 | 99 | 376 | +88 |
