= 2022 Professional Golf Tour of India =

Golf tour season

2022 Professional Golf Tour of India season
- Duration: 22 February 2022 – 24 December 2022
- Number of official events: 21
- Most wins: (India) Manu Gandas (6)
- Order of Merit: (India) Manu Gandas

The 2022 Professional Golf Tour of India, titled as the 2022 Tata Steel Professional Golf Tour of India for sponsorship reasons, was the 15th season of the Professional Golf Tour of India, the main professional golf tour in India since it was formed in 2006.

== European Tour partnership ==
In December, it was announced by the European Tour that the Professional Golf Tour of India had entered into a partnership with them and the PGA Tour. As part of the partnership, the leading player on the PGTI Order of Merit was given status onto the European Tour for the following season.

== Schedule ==
The following table lists official events during the 2022 season.

Date	Tournament	Location	Purse (₹)	Winner (Note: The number in brackets after each winner's name is the number of Professional Golf Tour of India events they had won up to and including that tournament.)	OWGR points	Other tours (Note: ADT − Asian Development Tour; ASA − Asian Tour.)
25 Feb	Gujarat Open Golf Championship	Gujarat	4,000,000	(India) Karandeep Kochhar (4)	5	
4 Mar	Glade One Masters	Gujarat	4,000,000	(India) Manu Gandas (2)	3	
12 Mar	Mujib Borsho Chattogram Open	Bangladesh	5,000,000	(India) Kshitij Naveed Kaul (3)	5	
18 Mar	Tata Steel PGTI Players Championship (Tollygunge)	West Bengal	5,000,000	(India) Yuvraj Sandhu (2)	5	
27 Mar	DGC Open	Delhi	US$500,000	(Thailand) Nitithorn Thippong (n/a)	10	ASA
1 Apr	Gurugram Challenge	Gujarat	US$75,000	(United States) Dodge Kemmer (n/a)	6	ADT
15 Apr	Tata Steel PGTI Players Championship (Chandigarh)	Haryana	5,000,000	(India) Yuvraj Sandhu (3)	5	
22 Apr	Delhi-NCR Open	Uttar Pradesh	4,000,000	(India) Manu Gandas (3)	5	
20 Aug	Tata Steel PGTI Players Championship (Coimbatore)	Tamil Nadu	5,000,000	(India) Khalin Joshi (6)	0.43	
26 Aug	Chennai Open Golf Championship	Chennai	4,000,000	(India) Manu Gandas (4)	0.47	
10 Sep	J&K Open	Jammu and Kashmir	4,000,000	(India) Yuvraj Sandhu (4)	0.57	
17 Sep	Jaipur Open	Rajasthan	4,000,000	(India) Om Prakash Chouhan (7)	0.40	
30 Sep	Kapil Dev - Grant Thornton Invitational	Gujarat	10,000,000	(India) Varun Parikh (1)	0.52	
7 Oct	Tata Steel PGTI Players Championship (Panchkula)	Haryana	5,000,000	(India) Yuvraj Sandhu (5)	0.64	
16 Oct	Jeev Milkha Singh Invitational	Haryana	15,000,000	(India) Gaganjeet Bhullar (12)	0.90	
22 Oct	Pune Open Golf Invitational	Maharashtra	4,000,000	(India) Veer Ahlawat (2)	0.65	
12 Nov	Telangana Golconda Masters	Telangana	4,000,000	(India) Manu Gandas (5)	0.44	
19 Nov	IndianOil Servo Masters Golf	Assam	7,500,000	(India) Yuvraj Sandhu (6)	0.44	
27 Nov	Vooty Masters	Telangana	10,000,000	(India) Manu Gandas (6)	0.48	
17 Dec	SSP Chawrasia Invitational	West Bengal	10,000,000	(India) Manu Gandas (7)	1.20	
24 Dec	Tata Steel Tour Championship	Jharkhand	30,000,000	(India) S. Chikkarangappa (17)	0.78	

== Order of Merit ==
The Order of Merit was titled as the Tata Steel PGTI Rankings and was based on prize money won during the season, calculated in Indian rupees. The leading player on the Order of Merit earned status to play on the 2023 European Tour (DP World Tour).

Position	Player	Prize money (₹)	Status earned
1	(India) Manu Gandas	8,850,688	Promoted to European Tour
2	(India) Yuvraj Sandhu	7,099,768	
3	(India) Ajeetesh Sandhu	5,694,880	
4	(India) Shamim Khan	5,205,766	
5	(India) Karandeep Kochhar	4,447,688	
