= 2011 Professional Golf Tour of India =

Golf tour season

2011 Professional Golf Tour of India season
- Duration: 13 January 2011 – 10 December 2011
- Number of official events: 21
- Most wins: (India) Gaganjeet Bhullar (4)
- Order of Merit: (India) Chiragh Kumar

The 2011 Professional Golf Tour of India, titled as the 2011 Aircel Professional Golf Tour of India for sponsorship reasons, was the fifth season of the Professional Golf Tour of India, the main professional golf tour in India since it was formed in 2006.

== Schedule ==
The following table lists official events during the 2011 season.

Date	Tournament	Location	Purse (₹)	Winner (Note: The number in brackets after each winner's name is the number of Professional Golf Tour of India events they had won up to and including that tournament.)	OWGR points	Other tours (Note: ASA − Asian Tour; CHA − Challenge Tour.)
16 Jan	Gujarat Kensville Challenge	Gujarat	€200,000	(India) Gaganjeet Bhullar (7)	12	CHA
29 Jan	American Express Bangladesh Open	Bangladesh	2,000,000	(India) Gaganjeet Bhullar (8)	n/a	
5 Feb	PGTI Players Championship (Royal Calcutta)	West Bengal	3,000,000	(India) Gaganjeet Bhullar (9)	n/a	
11 Feb	Aircel PGTI Players Championship (Tollygunge)	West Bengal	4,000,000	(India) Anirban Lahiri (6)	n/a	
26 Feb	PGTI Players Championship (Rambagh)	Rajasthan	3,000,000	(India) Sanjay Kumar (1)	n/a	
5 Mar	Aircel PGTI Players Championship (Chandigarh)	Haryana	4,000,000	(India) Gaganjeet Bhullar (10)	n/a	
2 Apr	Aircel PGTI Players Championship (Panchkula)	Haryana	4,000,000	(India) Anirban Lahiri (7)	n/a	
9 Apr	Panasonic Open (India)	Delhi	US$300,000	(India) Anirban Lahiri (8)	14	ASA
17 Apr	Surya Nepal Masters	Nepal	2,500,000	(India) Rashid Khan (1)	n/a	
21 May	SRF All India Matchplay Championship	Delhi	2,500,000	(India) Manav Jaini (1)	n/a	
4 Jun	PGTI Players Championship (Poona)	Maharashtra	2,500,000	(India) Shankar Das (2)	n/a	
10 Jun	PGTI Players Championship (Oxford)	Maharashtra	2,500,000	(India) Sujjan Singh (2)	n/a	
26 Aug	PGTI Players Championship (Classic)	Haryana	2,500,000	(India) Jyoti Randhawa (6)	n/a	
17 Sep	Global Green Bangalore Open	Karnataka	4,000,000	(Sri Lanka) Anura Rohana (1)	n/a	
23 Sep	Aircel PGTI Players Championship (Willingdon)	Maharashtra	4,000,000	(India) Feroz Ali Mollah (1)	n/a	
1 Oct	DLF Masters	Haryana	9,500,000	(India) Himmat Rai (2)	n/a	
8 Oct	Haryana Open	Haryana	5,000,000	(Sri Lanka) Mithun Perera (1)	n/a	
5 Nov	BILT Open	Uttar Pradesh	10,000,000	(India) Chiragh Kumar (3)	n/a	
27 Nov	Tata Open	Jharkhand	5,000,000	(India) Vinod Kumar (1)	n/a	
3 Dec	IndianOil XtraPremium Masters Golf	Assam	2,500,000	(India) Shankar Das (3)	n/a	
10 Dec	CG Open	Maharashtra	10,000,000	(India) Jyoti Randhawa (7)	n/a	

== Order of Merit ==
The Order of Merit was titled as the Rolex Rankings and was based on prize money won during the season, calculated in Indian rupees.

Position	Player	Prize money (₹)
1	(India) Chiragh Kumar	3,706,821
2	(India) Jyoti Randhawa	3,360,817
3	(India) Mukesh Kumar	2,842,592
4	(India) Anirban Lahiri	2,713,800
5	(India) Shamim Khan	2,697,825
