= DGC Open =

Coordinates: 28.600°N 77.238°E

Tournament information
- Location: Delhi, India
- Established: 2022
- Course: Delhi Golf Club
- Par: 72
- Length: 6,935 yards (6,341 m)
- Tours: Asian Tour; Professional Golf Tour of India
- Format: Stroke play
- Prize fund: US$750,000
- Month played: March
- Final year: 2023

Tournament record score
- Aggregate: 276 Miguel Tabuena
- To par: −12 as above

Final champion
- (Philippines) Miguel Tabuena

Location map
- Location in India Location in Delhi

The DGC Open was a golf tournament on the Asian Tour held at Delhi Golf Club in Delhi, India.

== History ==
The inaugural event was the first international golf tournament in India since the COVID-19 pandemic began. Gary Player, who recently finished a revamp of the course, was in attendance as Nitithorn Thippong claimed his maiden Asian Tour title after winning a playoff against Ajeetesh Sandhu with a birdie on the first extra hole.

The 2023 event was won by Miguel Tabuena. He started the final round six shots behind the 54-hole leader Rashid Khan. Tabuena shot a final round 65 to win by one shot.

== Winners ==
Year	Tour(s) (Note: ASA − Asian Tour; PGTI − Professional Golf Tour of India.)	Winner	Score	To par	Margin of victory	Runner-up
2023	ASA	(Philippines) Miguel Tabuena	276	−12	1 stroke	(India) Rashid Khan
2022	ASA, PGTI	(Thailand) Nitithorn Thippong	281	−7	Playoff	(India) Ajeetesh Sandhu
