= 2007–08 Professional Golf Tour of India =

Golf tour season

2007–08 Professional Golf Tour of India season
- Duration: 18 October 2007 – 28 December 2008
- Number of official events: 19
- Most wins: (India) Mukesh Kumar (4)
- Order of Merit: (India) Mukesh Kumar

The 2007–08 Professional Golf Tour of India was the second season of the Professional Golf Tour of India, the main professional golf tour in India since it was formed in 2006.

== Schedule ==
The following table lists official events during the 2007–08 season.

Date	Tournament	Location	Purse (₹)	Winner (Note: The number in brackets after each winner's name is the number of Professional Golf Tour of India events they had won up to and including that tournament.)
21 Oct	BILT Open	Karnataka	8,000,000	(Singapore) Lam Chih Bing (1)
18 Nov	IOC XtraPremium Masters Golf	Assam	2,000,000	(India) Mukesh Kumar (1)
23 Dec	Global Green Bangalore Open	Karnataka	3,000,000	(India) Rahul Ganapathy (1)
6 Jan	Tata Open	Jharkhand	2,000,000	(India) Mukesh Kumar (2)
2 Feb	Solaris Chemtech Open Golf Championship	Haryana	3,000,000	(India) Rahul Ganapathy (2)
15 Mar	SRF All India Matchplay Championship	Delhi	2,000,000	(India) Arjun Singh (1)
30 Mar	Centurion Bank of Punjab Open Golf Championship	Haryana	2,500,000	(India) Mukesh Kumar (3)
31 May	PGTI Players Championship (Chandigarh)	Haryana	3,000,000	(India) Harendra Gupta (1)
21 Jun	PGTI Players Championship (Royal Calcutta)	West Bengal	3,000,000	(India) Rahil Gangjee (1)
23 Aug	PGTI Players Championship (Coimbatore)	Tamil Nadu	3,000,000	(India) Digvijay Singh (1)
30 Aug	Tamil Nadu Open Golf Championship	Tamil Nadu	2,000,000	(India) Mukesh Kumar (4)
5 Sep	PGTI Players Championship (Poona)	Maharashtra	3,000,000	(Bangladesh) Siddikur Rahman (1)
13 Sep	AIS Golf Open	Haryana	3,000,000	(India) Rahul Ganapathy (3)
21 Sep	DLF Masters	Haryana	8,000,000	(India) Jyoti Randhawa (4)
8 Nov	Toyota Altis Open	Karnataka	2,000,000	(India) Chinnaswamy Muniyappa (1)
29 Nov	HUDA-GTPL – Unitech Haryana Open	Haryana	2,000,000	(Bangladesh) Siddikur Rahman (2)
6 Dec	Tata Open	Jharkhand	2,000,000	(India) Shamim Khan (1)
21 Dec	ONGC Masters	Karnataka	2,000,000	(India) Shamim Khan (2)
28 Dec	BILT Open	Karnataka	8,000,000	(India) Jyoti Randhawa (5)

== Order of Merit ==
The Order of Merit was based on prize money won during the season, calculated in Indian rupees.

Position	Player	Prize money (₹)
1	(India) Mukesh Kumar	3,431,992
2	(India) Shamim Khan	2,783,883
3	(India) Rahul Ganapathy	2,598,303
4	(India) Digvijay Singh	2,263,422
5	(India) Gaganjeet Bhullar	2,037,758
