= Ashok Kumar (golfer) =

Indian golfer

Personal information
- Nationality: India
- Born: 20 July 1983 (age 43) India
- Height: 1.85 m (6 ft 1 in)

Career
- Sport: Golf
- Turned professional: 2002
- Current tour: Professional Golf Tour of India
- Professional wins: 18

Achievements and awards
- PGA of India Tour Order of Merit winner: 1999, 2001, 2002, 2003–04
- Professional Golf Tour of India Order of Merit winner: 2006–07, 2010

Ashok Kumar (born 20 July 1983) is a professional golfer from India, currently playing on the Professional Golf Tour of India, where he was the 2003/04 and the 2006/07 Order of Merit winner.

In 2004, he won the Hero Honda Golf Tour Order of Merit for the 2003/04 season. He won it again in 2006/07 and in 2010 under the name of the PGTI after recording 5 wins in 8 events played, where he finished in the top-10 in all 8 of them.

Kumar played in 12 events in 2008, but did not record a win, finishing in the top-10 8 times.

Kumar added another win in 2009 in April at the All India Match Play Championship.

== Professional wins (18) ==
=== Professional Golf Tour of India wins (13) ===
No.	Date	Tournament	Winning score	Margin of victory	Runner(s)-up
1	3 Feb 2007	IndianOil XtraPremium Masters	−14 (68-67-71-68=274)	6 strokes	(India) Vikrant Chopra, (India) Shamim Khan
2	25 Feb 2007	Solaris Global Green Open	−14 (64-70-68-64=266)	1 stroke	(India) Shiv Chawrasia
3	17 Mar 2007	SRF All India Matchplay Championship	4 and 3		(India) S. Madaiah
4	6 May 2007	CG Open	−19 (67-64-64-66=261)	7 strokes	(India) Gaganjeet Bhullar
5	17 Jun 2007	Color Plus Open	−18 (66-68-67-69=270)	2 strokes	(India) Gaganjeet Bhullar
6	4 Apr 2009	SRF All India Matchplay Championship (2)	5 and 4		(India) Rahul Ganapathy
7	19 Dec 2009	PGTI Tour Championship	−15 (65-69-70-69=273)	1 stroke	(India) Shamim Khan
8	19 Sep 2010	DLF Masters	−16 (70-65-65=200)	8 strokes	(India) Gaganjeet Bhullar
9	9 Oct 2010	Global Green Bangalore Open	−10 (70-71-67-70=278)	3 strokes	(India) Himmat Rai
10	21 Nov 2010	Tata Open	−16 (59-65-66-70=260)	6 strokes	(India) Vijay Kumar
11	27 Nov 2010	DDA Open Golf Championship	−20 (63-68-67-62=260)	10 strokes	(India) Sujjan Singh
12	5 Dec 2015	CG Open (2)	−12 (69-69-62-68=268)	Playoff	(India) M. Dharma
13	7 Oct 2016	PGTI Masters	−17 (68-67-70-66=271)	Playoff	(India) Ajeetesh Sandhu

=== Hero Honda Golf Tour wins (3) ===
- 2004 The Hindu Open, Hero Honda Open, PGAI-TSM Open

=== Other wins (2) ===
- 1999 Ericsson International Golf Invitation Tournament
- 2008 BILT Open Pro-Am

== Team appearances ==
Amateur

- Eisenhower Trophy (representing India): 2000
- Bonallack Trophy (representing Asia/Pacific): 2000
