= Panasonic Open =

Panasonic Open may refer to:

- Panasonic Open (Japan), a golf tournament in Japan
- Panasonic Open (India), a golf tournament in India
