= Gujarat Kensville Challenge =

Tournament information
- Location: Ahmedabad, India
- Established: 2011
- Courses: Kensville Golf & Country Club
- Par: 72
- Length: 7,224 yards (6,606 m)
- Tours: Challenge Tour; Professional Golf Tour of India
- Format: Stroke play
- Prize fund: €200,000
- Month played: February
- Final year: 2013

Tournament record score
- Aggregate: 274 Shiv Kapur (2013)
- To par: −14 as above

Final champion
- (India) Shiv Kapur
- Location in India Location in Gujarat

The Gujarat Kensville Challenge was a golf tournament on the Challenge Tour and the Professional Golf Tour of India, played in India. It was held for the first time in January 2011 at Kensville Golf and Country Club in Ahmedabad, Gujarat, and was the season opening event on the tour. It was last played in 2013.

Gaganjeet Bhullar won the inaugural tournament to become the first Indian player to win on the Challenge Tour.

== Winners ==
Year	Tours (Note: CHA − Challenge Tour; PGTI − Professional Golf Tour of India.)	Winner	Score	To par	Margin of victory	Runner-up
2013	CHA, PGTI	(India) Shiv Kapur	274	−14	2 strokes	(Scotland) Andrew McArthur
2012	CHA, PGTI	(Germany) Maximilian Kieffer	281	−7	Playoff	(India) Rahil Gangjee
2011	CHA, PGTI	(India) Gaganjeet Bhullar	283	−5	1 stroke	(England) Matt Ford
