= Sujjan Singh (golfer) =

Indian professional golfer (born 1980)

Personal information
- Nationality: India
- Born: 12 September 1980 (age 46)
- Height: 5 ft 5 in (1.65 m)

Career
- Sport: Golf
- Turned professional: 2005
- Current tour: Asian Tour
- Former tour: Professional Golf Tour of India
- Professional wins: 3

Sujjan Singh (born 12 September 1980) is an Indian professional golfer.

== Early life ==
Singh was educated at Bishop Cotton School (Shimla), a prestigious boarding school. In 1998, he was the School Captain.

== Professional career ==
In 2005, Singh turned professional. He joined the Professional Golf Tour of India, where he has two wins. In 2011 he joined the Asian Tour, and finished 32nd in the Order of Merit in his debut season to retain his card.

== Personal life ==
Singh was married to Irina Brar, a former Indian number one ladies' golfer. The couple have been separated since 2018.

Singh is a close friend of fellow professional golfer Gurbaaz Mann. The two even formed a band together, in which Singh played drums.

== Professional wins (3) ==
=== Asian Development Tour wins (1) ===
No.	Date	Tournament	Winning score	Margin of victory	Runners-up
1	7 Jul 2012	Taman Dayu Championship	−22 (64-63-67-72=266)	6 strokes	(Australia) Anthony Choat, (Philippines) Antonio Lascuña, (Australia) Michael Moore

=== Professional Golf Tour of India wins (2) ===
No.	Date	Tournament	Winning score	Margin of victory	Runner-up
1	7 Mar 2010	Aircel PGTI Players Championship (Panchkula)	−7 (72-72-66-71=281)	Playoff	(Sri Lanka) Anura Rohana
2	10 Jun 2011	PGTI Players Championship (Oxford)	−11 (69-72-67-69=277)	1 stroke	(India) Himmat Rai
