= Volkswagen Masters-China =

Tournament information
- Location: Yalong Bay, China
- Established: 2004
- Course: Yalong Bay Golf Club
- Par: 72
- Length: 7,186 yards (6,571 m)
- Tour: Asian Tour
- Format: Stroke play
- Prize fund: US$300,000
- Month played: October
- Final year: 2006

Tournament record score
- Aggregate: 266 Retief Goosen (2005)
- To par: −22 as above

Final champion
- (South Africa) Retief Goosen
- Location in China

The Volkswagen Masters-China was an event that was played on the Asian Tour from 2004 to 2006. It was played in Beijing, China. The purse was $300,000. The only multiple winner of the event was Retief Goosen, who won the event back-to-back in 2005 and 2006.

== Winners ==
Year	Winner	Score	To par	Margin of victory	Runner-up	Ref.
2006	(South Africa) Retief Goosen (2)	267	−21	3 strokes	(New Zealand) Michael Campbell	
2005	(South Africa) Retief Goosen	266	−22	6 strokes	(New Zealand) Michael Campbell	
2004	(India) Rahil Gangjee	273	−15	Playoff	(South Korea) Mo Joong-kyung	
