= Rahil Gangjee =

Indian professional golfer (born 1978)

Personal information
- Nationality: India
- Born: 2 October 1978 (age 48) Calcutta, India
- Height: 165 cm (5 ft 5 in)
- Weight: 72 kg (159 lb)

Career
- Sport: Golf
- College: Bhawanipur Education Society College
- Turned professional: 2001
- Current tours: Asian Tour; Professional Golf Tour of India
- Former tours: Japan Golf Tour; Web.com Tour; Asian Development Tour
- Professional wins: 8

Number of wins by tour
- Japan Golf Tour: 1
- Asian Tour: 2
- Other: 5

Rahil Gangjee (born 2 October 1978) is an Indian professional golfer who has played on the Japan Golf Tour and the Asian Tour, where he has two victories.

== Early life and amateur career ==
In 1978, Gangjee was born in Calcutta, but now resides in Bengaluru. He was educated at La Martiniere Calcutta. He had a decorated amateur career that included the 1997 Sri Lankan Amateur and the East India Amateur in 1997, 1998 and 2000. He would soon become India's number one amateur in 1999.

He kept the title of being India's top ranked amateur by winning the Northern India Amateur in 2000. In the same year he won the Western India Amateur, by a margin of 19 strokes.

== Professional career ==
In 2001, Gangjee turned professional. He finished runner-up at the PGA of India Tour qualifying school. He won in his very first year as a professional in Lucknow. He played in his first full season on the Asian Tour in 2004. Just as he had won in his first year on the PGA of India Tour, he also won in his debut year on the Asia Tour.

Gangjee was a surprise winner in his lone tournament victory at the Volkswagen Masters-China in 2004. It was only his 4th start of the season and 8th career start on Tour. He finished at 15-under-par and won in a playoff over Mo Joong-kyung. The event featured many notable names including Ian Woosnam, Nick Faldo, Phillip Price, Jeev Milkha Singh, Des Terblanche and Zhang Lianwei.

Gangjee would continue playing full-time on the Asian Tour, not picking up another tournament win between 2004 and 2008. He made 16 of 25 cuts with only one top-10 finish in 2008. He did however pick up a win in June 2008 at the PGTI Players Championship on the Professional Golf Tour of India in his hometown of Calcutta by a margin of five strokes.

At the end of 2010 Gangjee qualified for the Nationwide Tour. At the 2011 Mylan Classic, Gangjee made an ace on the par-4 15th hole during the final round. He used driver to pull off the 318 yard shot.

Gangjee played on the Nationwide Tour in 2011 and 2012 and then returned to the Asian Tour. His best finish on the Nationwide Tour was T-11 at the 2011 Rex Hospital Open.

Gangjee's next significant win came in April 2018 in Japan when he won the Panasonic Open Golf Championship. This secured his Japan Golf Tour card for the following 3 years. He also won the Louis Philippe Cup (an Asian Development Tour) event in the same year.

== Personal life ==
Rahil Gangjee participated in most sports in this school life. He represented his school La Martiniere Calcutta in swimming from the early age of 6. He also excelled in elocution, won plenty of times for Martin House. He ended his school life playing Hockey for his school and was the fastest runner in the 100 meters and 200 meters in class 11 and 12. He was prefect for house Martin and even sang for the choir. Rahil was interested in horseback riding, but his father made him give it up because he believed it was too dangerous as it could be too detrimental for his potential career in golf .

Rahil is a member of Royal Calcutta Golf Club and Tollygunge Club, where he grew up and honed his golfing skills.

Gangjee credits Arjun Atwal (a former Asian Number One), as his inspiration. Atwal lived three doors down from Gangjee in Calcutta.

== Amateur wins ==
- 1997 Sri Lankan Amateur, East India Amateur
- 1998 East India Amateur
- 2000 East India Amateur, Western India Amateur, Northern India Amateur

== Professional wins (8) ==
=== Japan Golf Tour wins (1) ===
No.	Date	Tournament	Winning score	Margin of victory	Runners-up
1	22 Apr 2018	Panasonic Open Golf Championship^{1}	−14 (69-65-68-68=270)	1 stroke	(South Korea) Hwang Jung-gon, (South Korea) Kim Hyung-sung

^{1}Co-sanctioned by the Asian Tour

=== Asian Tour wins (2) ===
No.	Date	Tournament	Winning score	Margin of victory	Runner(s)-up
1	2 May 2004	Volkswagen Masters-China	−15 (69-66-70-68=273)	Playoff	(South Korea) Mo Joong-kyung
2	22 Apr 2018	Panasonic Open Golf Championship^{1}	−14 (69-65-68-68=270)	1 stroke	(South Korea) Hwang Jung-gon, (South Korea) Kim Hyung-sung

^{1}Co-sanctioned by the Japan Golf Tour

Asian Tour playoff record (1–1)

No.	Year	Tournament	Opponent(s)	Result
1	2004	Volkswagen Masters-China	(South Korea) Mo Joong-kyung	Won with par on first extra hole
2	2014	Panasonic Open India	(India) Shiv Chawrasia, (Sri Lanka) Mithun Perera	Chawrasia won with birdie on first extra hole

=== Asian Development Tour wins (3) ===
No.	Date	Tournament	Winning score	Margin of victory	Runner(s)-up
1	3 Aug 2018	Louis Philippe Cup^{1}	−11 (69-69-68-63=269)	3 strokes	(India) Om Prakash Chouhan, (India) Rashid Khan
2	22 Jun 2024	PKNS Selangor Masters^{2}	−8 (66-66-67-73=272)	1 stroke	(Australia) Deyen Lawson
3	31 Aug 2024	BRG Open Golf Championship^{3}	−10 (72-67-70=209)	1 stroke	(Philippines) Aidric Chan, (India) Aman Raj

^{1}Co-sanctioned by the Professional Golf Tour of India
^{2}Co-sanctioned by the Professional Golf of Malaysia Tour
^{3}Co-sanctioned by the VGA Tour

=== Professional Golf Tour of India wins (3) ===
No.	Date	Tournament	Winning score	Margin of victory	Runners-up
1	21 Jun 2008	PGTI Players Championship (Royal Calcutta)	−9 (34-69-66-65=234)	5 strokes	(India) Ashok Kumar, (India) Anirban Lahiri
2	20 Sep 2013	PGTI Players Championship (Chandigarh II)	−13 (67-71-67-70=275)	6 strokes	(Bangladesh) Zamal Hossain, (India) Sujjan Singh
3	3 Aug 2018	Louis Philippe Cup^{1}	−11 (69-69-68-63=269)	3 strokes	(India) Om Prakash Chouhan, (India) Rashid Khan

^{1}Co-sanctioned by the Asian Development Tour

=== Other wins (1) ===
- 2001 HT Pro Golf Lucknow

== Playoff record ==
Challenge Tour playoff record (0–1)

No.	Year	Tournament	Opponent	Result
1	2012	Gujarat Kensville Challenge	(Germany) Maximilian Kieffer	Lost to par on first extra hole

== Team appearances ==
Amateur

- Eisenhower Trophy (representing India): 2000
