= Aamby Valley Asian Masters =

Golf tournament in Mumbai, India

Tournament information
- Location: Mumbai, India
- Established: 2006
- Course: Aamby Valley Golf Club
- Par: 72
- Length: 7,087 yards (6,480 m)
- Tour: Asian Tour
- Format: Stroke play
- Prize fund: US$400,000
- Month played: May
- Final year: 2006

Tournament record score
- Aggregate: 277 Hendrik Buhrmann
- To par: −11 as above

Final champion
- (South Africa) Hendrik Buhrmann
- Location in India Location in Maharashtra

The Aamby Valley Asian Masters was an Asian Tour golf tournament that was played only once, in May 2006 at the Aamby Valley Golf Club in Mumbai.

The Asian Masters was one of two Asian Tour events in India that year alongside the Hero Honda Indian Open. The prize fund was US$400,000 and the winner was Hendrik Buhrmann of South Africa, who finally won his first Asian Tour event after eleven years of trying.

== Winners ==
Year	Winner	Score	To par	Margin of victory	Runner-up
2006	(South Africa) Hendrik Buhrmann	277	−11	2 strokes	(England) Simon Hurd
