= Indonesia President Invitational =

Tournament information
- Location: Jakarta, Indonesia
- Established: 2007
- Course: Damai Indah Golf Club
- Par: 72
- Length: 7,120 yards (6,510 m)
- Tour: Asian Tour
- Format: Stroke play
- Prize fund: US$400,000
- Month played: July
- Final year: 2009

Tournament record score
- Aggregate: 266 Gaganjeet Bhullar (2009)
- To par: −22 as above

Final champion
- (India) Gaganjeet Bhullar
- Location in Indonesia

The Indonesia President Invitational was an Asian Tour golf tournament. It was played for the first time in October 2007 at the Bumi Serpong Damai Course in Indonesia. The Bumi Serpong Damai Course was designed by Jack Nicklaus. The tournament's main sponsor was Pertamina in 2007 and 2008. In 2009, the purse was US$400,000.

== Winners ==
| Year | Winner | Score | To par | Margin of victory | Runner-up |
Indonesia President Invitational
| 2009 | (India) Gaganjeet Bhullar | 266 | −22 | 2 strokes | (Australia) Adam Blyth |
Pertamina Indonesia President Invitational
| 2008 | (Australia) Scott Hend | 272 | −16 | 3 strokes | (Taiwan) Lin Wen-tang |
| 2007 | (Philippines) Juvic Pagunsan | 269 | −19 | 1 stroke | (India) Gaganjeet Bhullar |
