= 2010 Professional Golf Tour of India =

Golf tour season

2010 Professional Golf Tour of India season
- Duration: 25 January 2010 – 18 December 2010
- Number of official events: 22
- Most wins: (India) Ashok Kumar (4) (India) Mukesh Kumar (4)
- Order of Merit: (India) Ashok Kumar

The 2010 Professional Golf Tour of India, titled as the 2010 Aircel Professional Golf Tour of India for sponsorship reasons, was the fourth season of the Professional Golf Tour of India, the main professional golf tour in India since it was formed in 2006.

== Schedule ==
The following table lists official events during the 2010 season.

| Date | Tournament | Location | Purse (₹) | Winner (Note: The number in brackets after each winner's name is the number of Professional Golf Tour of India events they had won up to and including that tournament.) |
|---|---|---|---|---|
| 28 Jan | American Express Bangladesh Open | Bangladesh | 2,000,000 | (Bangladesh) Siddikur Rahman (4) |
| 5 Feb | Aircel PGTI Players Championship (Tollygunge) | West Bengal | 4,000,000 | (India) Mukesh Kumar (9) |
| 7 Mar | Aircel PGTI Players Championship (Panchkula) | Haryana | 4,000,000 | (India) Sujjan Singh (1) |
| 13 Mar | Solaris Chemtech Open Golf Championship | Haryana | 4,000,000 | (India) Shiv Chawrasia (2) |
| 11 Apr | SRF All India Matchplay Championship | Delhi | 2,500,000 | (India) Shamim Khan (3) |
| 7 May | PGTI Players Championship (Bombay Presidency) | Maharashtra | 3,000,000 | (India) Gaganjeet Bhullar (6) |
| 14 May | PGTI Players Championship (Aamby Valley) | Maharashtra | 3,000,000 | (India) Anirban Lahiri (3) |
| 25 Jun | Aircel PGTI Players Championship (Poona) | Maharashtra | 4,000,000 | (India) Mukesh Kumar (10) |
| 2 Jul | Aircel PGTI Players Championship (Oxford) | Maharashtra | 4,000,000 | (India) Anirban Lahiri (4) |
| 3 Sep | PGTI Players Championship (Chandigarh) | Haryana | 2,500,000 | (India) Mukesh Kumar (11) |
| 10 Sep | PGTI Players Championship (Golden Greens) | Haryana | 2,500,000 | (India) Chiragh Kumar (1) |
| 19 Sep | DLF Masters | Haryana | 9,500,000 | (India) Ashok Kumar (8) |
| 9 Oct | Global Green Bangalore Open | Karnataka | 4,000,000 | (India) Ashok Kumar (9) |
| 15 Oct | Aircel PGTI Players Championship (Willingdon) | Maharashtra | 4,000,000 | (India) Raju Ali Mollah (1) |
| 23 Oct | Haryana Open | Haryana | 4,000,000 | (India) Vijay Kumar (1) |
| 30 Oct | BILT Open | Karnataka | 10,000,000 | (India) Anirban Lahiri (5) |
| 7 Nov | LG Race to Ireland | Uttar Pradesh | 3,000,000 | (India) Mukesh Kumar (12) |
| 13 Nov | IndianOil XtraPremium Masters Golf | Assam | 2,500,000 | (India) Shankar Das (1) |
| 21 Nov | Tata Open | Jharkhand | 5,000,000 | (India) Ashok Kumar (10) |
| 27 Nov | DDA Open Golf Championship | Delhi | 3,000,000 | (India) Ashok Kumar (11) |
| 11 Dec | CG Open | Maharashtra | 8,000,000 | (India) Mandeo Singh Pathania (1) |
| 18 Dec | LG Masters of PGTI | Delhi | 10,000,000 | (India) Chiragh Kumar (2) |

== Order of Merit ==
The Order of Merit was titled as the Rolex Rankings and was based on prize money won during the season, calculated in Indian rupees.

| Position | Player | Prize money (₹) |
|---|---|---|
| 1 | (India) Ashok Kumar | 5,394,125 |
| 2 | (India) Mukesh Kumar | 4,319,917 |
| 3 | (India) Anirban Lahiri | 3,736,208 |
| 4 | (India) Vijay Kumar | 3,696,125 |
| 5 | (India) Shamim Khan | 3,647,075 |
