= 2009 Professional Golf Tour of India =

Golf tour season

2009 Professional Golf Tour of India season
- Duration: 28 January 2009 – 19 December 2009
- Number of official events: 21
- Most wins: (India) Gaganjeet Bhullar (5)
- Order of Merit: (India) Anirban Lahiri

The 2009 Professional Golf Tour of India, titled as the 2009 Aircel Professional Golf Tour of India for sponsorship reasons, was the third season of the Professional Golf Tour of India, the main professional golf tour in India since it was formed in 2006.

== Aircel title sponsorship ==
It was the first season in which the tour had signed a title sponsorship agreement with Aircel, being renamed as the Aircel Professional Golf Tour of India.

== Schedule ==
The following table lists official events during the 2009 season.

Date	Tournament	Location	Purse (₹)	Winner (Note: The number in brackets after each winner's name is the number of Professional Golf Tour of India events they had won up to and including that tournament.)
31 Jan	City Bank - Dhaka Bank Bangladesh Open	Bangladesh	2,000,000	(Bangladesh) Zamal Hossain (1)
6 Feb	PGTI Players Championship (Tollygunge)	West Bengal	3,000,000	(India) Himmat Rai (1)
13 Feb	Solaris Chemtech Open Golf Championship	Haryana	3,000,000	(India) Mukesh Kumar (5)
15 Mar	PGTI Players Championship (Panchkula)	Haryana	3,000,000	(India) Gaganjeet Bhullar (1)
4 Apr	SRF All India Matchplay Championship	Delhi	2,000,000	(India) Ashok Kumar (6)
2 May	PGTI Players Championship (Rambagh)	Rajasthan	2,000,000	(India) Gaganjeet Bhullar (2)
9 May	PGTI Players Championship (Aamby Valley)	Maharashtra	2,000,000	(India) Gaganjeet Bhullar (3)
16 May	DDA Open Golf Championship	Delhi	2,000,000	(India) Mukesh Kumar (6)
15 Aug	PGTI Players Championship (Eagleton)	Karnataka	3,000,000	(India) Gaganjeet Bhullar (4)
22 Aug	Tamil Nadu Open	Tamil Nadu	2,000,000	(India) Mukesh Kumar (7)
5 Sep	Global Green Bangalore Open	Karnataka	3,000,000	(Bangladesh) Siddikur Rahman (3)
13 Sep	PGTI Players Championship (Chandigarh)	Haryana	3,000,000	(India) Amandeep Johl (1)
20 Sep	DLF Masters	Haryana	8,000,000	(India) Gaganjeet Bhullar (5)
27 Sep	Haryana Open	Haryana	3,000,000	(India) Anirban Lahiri (1)
25 Oct	IndianOil XtraPremium Masters Golf	Assam	2,000,000	(India) Mukesh Kumar (8)
1 Nov	Tata Open	Jharkhand	2,000,000	(India) Gurki Shergill (1)
8 Nov	BILT Open	Karnataka	10,000,000	(India) Anirban Lahiri (2)
14 Nov	Aircel PGTI Players Championship (Willingdon)	Maharashtra	3,000,000	(India) Vishal Singh (1)
21 Nov	ONGC Masters	Karnataka	2,000,000	(India) Gaurav Pratap Singh (1)
28 Nov	CG Open	Maharashtra	8,000,000	(Australia) Kunal Bhasin (1)
19 Dec	PGTI Tour Championship	Haryana	8,000,000	(India) Ashok Kumar (7)

== Order of Merit ==
The Order of Merit was based on prize money won during the season, calculated in Indian rupees.

Position	Player	Prize money (₹)
1	(India) Anirban Lahiri	3,657,853
2	(India) Mukesh Kumar	3,335,100
3	(India) Ashok Kumar	3,265,729
4	(India) Shamim Khan	3,127,280
5	(India) Gaganjeet Bhullar	3,105,000
