= Chiragh Kumar =

Indian professional golfer

Personal information
- Nationality: India
- Born: 15 December 1983 (age 42)
- Height: 5 ft 6 in (1.68 m)

Career
- Sport: Golf
- Turned professional: 2006
- Current tour: Asian Tour
- Former tour: Professional Golf Tour of India
- Professional wins: 5

Number of wins by tour
- Asian Tour: 1
- Other: 4

Achievements and awards
- Professional Golf Tour of India Order of Merit winner: 2011
Medal record
Asian Games
| Silver medal – second place | 2006 Doha | Men's team |

Chiragh Kumar (born 15 December 1983) is an Indian professional golfer.

== Career ==
Kumar won a silver medal as an amateur at the 2006 Asian Games, before turning professional later that year and joining the Professional Golf Tour of India. In 2011 he won three times, was the leading money-winner on tour and was named tour player of the year.

At the 2011 Hero Honda Indian Open, an Asian Tour event, Kumar was the halfway leader and went on to finish second to David Gleeson in the tournament. His winnings from the event would see him end the year 21st on the Asian Tour Order of Merit, giving him a full tour card for the first time.

== Professional wins (5) ==
=== Asian Tour wins (1) ===
| No. | Date | Tournament | Winning score | Margin of victory | Runners-up |
|---|---|---|---|---|---|
| 1 | 8 Nov 2015 | Panasonic Open India^{1} | −13 (67-66-72-70=275) | 1 stroke | (Bangladesh) Siddikur Rahman, (Thailand) Thaworn Wiratchant |

^{1}Co-sanctioned by the Professional Golf Tour of India

=== Professional Golf Tour of India wins (5) ===
| No. | Date | Tournament | Winning score | Margin of victory | Runner(s)-up |
|---|---|---|---|---|---|
| 1 | 10 Sep 2010 | PGTI Players Championship (Golden Greens) | −10 (71-64-72-71=278) | 3 strokes | (India) Mukesh Kumar |
| 2 | 18 Dec 2010 | LG Masters of PGTI | −13 (69-69-68-69=275) | 5 strokes | (India) Sanjay Kumar |
| 3 | 5 Nov 2011 | BILT Open | −15 (66-68-72-67=273) | 1 stroke | (India) Vikrant Chopra, (India) Anirban Lahiri |
| 4 | 19 Apr 2013 | Sri Lanka Ports Authority Open | −11 (72-66-67-68=273) | 1 stroke | (Sri Lanka) Mithun Perera |
| 5 | 8 Nov 2015 | Panasonic Open India^{1} | −13 (67-66-72-70=275) | 1 stroke | (Bangladesh) Siddikur Rahman, (Thailand) Thaworn Wiratchant |

^{1}Co-sanctioned by the Asian Tour

== Team appearances ==
Amateur

- Asian Games: 2006
