= Ho Tram Open =

Asian Tour golf tournament

Coordinates: 10.4822°N 107.4477°E

Tournament information
- Location: Phước Thuận, Vietnam
- Established: 2015
- Course: The Bluffs Ho Tram Strip
- Par: 71
- Length: 7,359 yards (6,729 m)
- Tour: Asian Tour
- Format: Stroke play
- Prize fund: US$1,000,000
- Month played: December
- Final year: 2015

Tournament record score
- Aggregate: 270 Sergio García (2015); 270 Lin Wen-tang (2015); 270 Himmat Rai (2015); 270 Thaworn Wiratchant (2015)
- To par: −14 as above

Final champion
- (Spain) Sergio García
- Location in Vietnam

The Ho Tram Open was a golf tournament on the Asian Tour. It was played only once, from 3–6 December 2015 at The Bluffs Ho Tram Strip, in Phước Thuận, Vietnam. Sergio García won the event in a playoff.

The renamed Ho Tram Players Championship was scheduled to become the Asian Tour's flagship event in 2017, but was postponed due to ongoing building work at the host venue. It was again scheduled to be played in 2018 and 2019, but was never held.

== Winners ==
Year	Winner	Score	To par	Margin of victory	Runners-up
Ho Tram Players Championship
2018	Removed from the schedule				
2017	Postponed				
2016: No tournament
Ho Tram Open
2015	(Spain) Sergio García	270	−14	Playoff	(Taiwan) Lin Wen-tang (India) Himmat Rai (Thailand) Thaworn Wiratchant
