= 2012 Professional Golf Tour of India =

Golf tour season

2012 Professional Golf Tour of India season
- Duration: 17 January 2012 – 1 December 2012
- Number of official events: 23
- Most wins: (India) Shamim Khan (3)
- Order of Merit: (India) Shamim Khan

The 2012 Professional Golf Tour of India was the sixth season of the Professional Golf Tour of India, the main professional golf tour in India since it was formed in 2006.

== Schedule ==
The following table lists official events during the 2012 season.

Date	Tournament	Location	Purse (₹)	Winner (Note: The number in brackets after each winner's name is the number of Professional Golf Tour of India events they had won up to and including that tournament.)	OWGR points	Other tours (Note: ASA − Asian Tour; CHA − Challenge Tour.)
20 Jan	American Express Bangladesh Open	Bangladesh	2,000,000	(Bangladesh) Zamal Hossain (2)	n/a	
29 Jan	Gujarat Kensville Challenge	Gujarat	€200,000	(Germany) Maximilian Kieffer (n/a)	12	CHA
25 Feb	SAIL-SBI Open	Delhi	US$300,000	(India) Anirban Lahiri (9)	14	ASA
17 Mar	Surya Nepal Masters	Nepal	2,500,000	(India) Abhijit Singh Chadha (1)	n/a	
24 Mar	PGTI Players Championship (Noida)	Uttar Pradesh	2,000,000	(India) Jyoti Randhawa (8)	n/a	
1 Apr	Panasonic Open India	Delhi	US$300,000	(India) Digvijay Singh (2)	14	ASA
20 Apr	PGTI Players Championship (Poona I)	Maharashtra	2,000,000	(India) Shamim Khan (4)	n/a	
27 Apr	PGTI Players Championship (Oxford)	Maharashtra	2,000,000	(India) Om Prakash Chouhan (1)	n/a	
1 Jun	PGTI Players Championship (Chandigarh)	Haryana	2,000,000	(India) Harendra Gupta (2)	n/a	
8 Jun	PGTI Players Championship (Golden Greens I)	Haryana	2,000,000	(Australia) Kunal Bhasin (2)	n/a	
10 Aug	PGTI Players Championship (Prestige)	Karnataka	3,000,000	(Sri Lanka) Anura Rohana (2)	n/a	
18 Aug	Standard Chartered Open	Sri Lanka	2,700,000	(Sri Lanka) Mithun Perera (2)	n/a	
25 Aug	PGTI Players Championship (Coimbatore)	Tamil Nadu	2,000,000	(India) Rashid Khan (2)	n/a	
14 Sep	PGTI Players Championship (Golden Greens II)	Haryana	2,000,000	(India) Om Prakash Chouhan (2)	n/a	
21 Sep	PGTI Players Championship (Classic)	Haryana	2,000,000	(India) Shamim Khan (5)	n/a	
29 Sep	IndianOil XtraPremium Masters Golf	Assam	2,500,000	(India) Mukesh Kumar (13)	n/a	
6 Oct	CG Open	Maharashtra	10,000,000	(India) Harendra Gupta (3)	n/a	
13 Oct	BILT Open	Delhi	10,000,000	(India) Shamim Khan (6)	n/a	
4 Nov	DLF Masters	Haryana	9,500,000	(India) Ajeetesh Sandhu (1)	n/a	
10 Nov	PGTI Players Championship (Poona II)	Maharashtra	3,500,000	(India) Mukesh Kumar (14)	n/a	
16 Nov	PGTI Players Championship (Aamby Valley)	Maharashtra	4,000,000	(India) Vinod Kumar (2)	n/a	
25 Nov	Tata Open	Jharkhand	5,000,000	(Sri Lanka) Mithun Perera (3)	n/a	
1 Dec	McLeod Russel Tour Championship	West Bengal	12,500,000	(India) Shiv Chawrasia (3)	n/a	

== Order of Merit ==
The Order of Merit was titled as the Rolex Rankings and was based on prize money won during the season, calculated in Indian rupees.

Position	Player	Prize money (₹)
1	(India) Shamim Khan	5,747,713
2	(India) Rashid Khan	4,881,910
3	(India) Harendra Gupta	3,917,285
4	(Sri Lanka) Mithun Perera	3,907,688
5	(India) Mukesh Kumar	3,487,593
