= Mukesh Kumar (golfer) =

Indian professional golfer (born 1965)

Personal information
- Nationality: India
- Born: 1 August 1965 (age 61) Mhow, Madhya Pradesh, India
- Height: 6 ft 1 in (1.85 m)
- Weight: 159 lb (72 kg; 11.4 st)

Career
- Sport: Golf
- Turned professional: 1987
- Current tour: Professional Golf Tour of India
- Professional wins: 51

Number of wins by tour
- Asian Tour: 1
- Other: 50

Achievements and awards
- PGA of India Tour Order of Merit winner: 2000–01, 2001–02, 2002–03, 2004–05, 2005–06
- Professional Golf Tour of India Order of Merit winner: 2007–08

Mukesh Kumar (born 1 August 1965) is a professional golfer from India who currently plays on the Professional Golf Tour of India (PGTI). He has won six Order of Merit titles on the PGTI and on earlier Indian tours. In terms of professional wins he is one of India's most successful golfers. He won his first Asian Tour event in 2016 at the Panasonic Open India.

== Professional career ==
Kumar has over 100 professional wins and was the Indian Champion Golfer of the Year for 2000/2001. In 2004/2005 Kumar had 19 top-10s in 22 starts with 5 wins and 5 runners-up on the AMBI PGAI Tour.

After a 15-year career with 87 career titles, Kumar won his first event at the Delhi Golf Club in those 15 years at the PSPB Open Petroleum Golf Championship with a three stroke win over Shiv Chawrasia and Digvijay Singh. It was his second win of 2005 to go along with his win in January at the Eastern Open and 3rd win on the AMBI PGAI Tour.

In his 2002/2003 season on the Hero Honda PGA Tour he had 11 wins, the most by anyone in that Tours history.

Kumar won his 100th professional event at the 2008 Tata Open.

Kumar's best year on the PGTI was in the 2007/2008 season, where he had four wins, 11 top-10s and his 6th Order of Merit title in India. He added a 5th career PGTI Tour win at the Solaris Chemtech Open in February 2005. His 6th win came in May at the DDA Golf Open. The win took him to the top spot on the Order of Merit. He is the career earnings leader on the PGTI. His 7th win came at the Tamil Nadu Open in August. He won the Indianoil Xtra Premium Golf Masters in October for his 8th PGTI win, taking him to second on the Order of Merit, behind Gaganjeet Bhullar.

In December 2016 at age 51, Kumar won his first Asian Tour title at the Panasonic Open India.

== Professional wins (51) ==
=== Asian Tour wins (1) ===
No.	Date	Tournament	Winning score	Margin of victory	Runners-up
1	4 Dec 2016	Panasonic Open India^{1}	−11 (67-69-70=206) (Note: Shortened to 54 holes due to weather.)	2 strokes	(India) Rashid Khan, (India) Jyoti Randhawa

^{1}Co-sanctioned by the Professional Golf Tour of India

=== Professional Golf Tour of India wins (21) ===
No.	Date	Tournament	Winning score	Margin of victory	Runner(s)-up
1	18 Nov 2007	IOC XtraPremium Masters Golf	−8 (69-73-68-70=280)	2 strokes	(India) Rahul Ganapathy
2	6 Jan 2008	Tata Open	−10 (69-68-67-68=272)	3 strokes	(India) Harendra Gupta
3	30 Mar 2008	Centurion Bank of Punjab Open Golf Championship	−14 (67-69-68-70=274)	Playoff	(India) Gaganjeet Bhullar
4	30 Aug 2008	Tamil Nadu Open Golf Championship	−21 (67-63-64-65=259)	11 strokes	(India) Sanjay Kumar
5	13 Feb 2009	Solaris Chemtech Open Golf Championship	−16 (68-70-67-67=272)	5 strokes	(India) Rahil Gangjee
6	16 May 2009	DDA Open Golf Championship	−12 (69-67-65-67=268)	Playoff	(India) Vijay Kumar
7	22 Aug 2009	Tamil Nadu Open	−13 (65-65-66-71=267)	2 strokes	(India) Vijay Kumar
8	25 Oct 2009	IndianOil XtraPremium Masters Golf (2)	−18 (68-66-71-65=270)	7 strokes	(India) Shamim Khan, (India) Feroz Ali Mollah
9	5 Feb 2010	Aircel PGTI Players Championship (Tollygunge)	−12 (65-69-66-68=268)	6 strokes	(India) Manav Jaini
10	25 Jun 2010	Aircel PGTI Players Championship (Poona)	−5 (73-71-68-67=279)	Playoff	(India) Rahil Gangjee
11	3 Sep 2010	PGTI Players Championship (Chandigarh)	−8 (70-67-70-73=280)	1 stroke	(India) Harendra Gupta, (India) Gaurav Pratap Singh
12	7 Nov 2010	LG Race to Ireland	−9 (69-66=135)	2 strokes	(India) Manav Jaini
13	29 Sep 2012	IndianOil XtraPremium Masters Golf (3)	−11 (67-69-66-71=273)	2 strokes	(India) Harendra Gupta
14	10 Nov 2012	PGTI Players Championship (Poona II)	−15 (68-67-66-68=269)	6 strokes	(India) Kapil Kumar
15	22 Feb 2013	PGTI Players Championship (Chandigarh I)	−13 (67-67-75-66=275)	4 strokes	(India) Ashbeer Saini (a)
16	7 Mar 2015	Cochin Masters	−14 (71-71-66-66=274)	2 strokes	(India) Rahil Gangjee, (India) Shubhankar Sharma
17	20 Dec 2015	Tata Open (2)	−15 (70-65-67-67=269)	Playoff	(India) Vinod Kumar, (India) Amardeep Malik
18	14 Oct 2016	Chennai Open Golf Championship	−20 (61-68-65-66=260)	11 strokes	(India) Honey Baisoya
19	4 Dec 2016	Panasonic Open India^{1}	−11 (67-69-70=206)	2 strokes	(India) Rashid Khan, (India) Jyoti Randhawa
20	15 Apr 2017	Cochin Masters	−12 (70-68-71-67=276)	1 stroke	(Sri Lanka) Anura Rohana
21	10 May 2019	Tata Steel PGTI Players Championship (Panchkula)	−15 (70-67-71-65=273)	1 stroke	(India) Angad Cheema

^{1}Co-sanctioned by the Asian Tour

=== PGA of India Tour wins (5) ===
- 2004 Hyundai-TNGF Open, Indian Oil Servo Masters
- 2005 Eastern Open, Airtel Open, PSPB Open Petroleum Golf Championship

=== Other wins (25) ===
- 1997 BPGC-ANZ Grindlays Golf Championship
- 1998 BPGC-ANZ Grindlays Golf Championship
- 2001 Leela-BGC Open, BPGC Open, TNGF Open, Sher-e-Kashmir Open
- 2002 Padampat Singhania Open, Royal Challenge Grand Prix, DHL Challenge, Tata Open, Bangladesh Open, Hyundai Open, Forest Hill Golf Open, Cotton City Open
- 2003 Royal Challenge Grand Prix, DHL Pro-Am, DHL Challenge, HT Proi Golf
- 2004 Hyundai TNGF Open
- 2005 Hyundai TNGF Open, Hero Honda Open East, Vipul Indian Masters
- 2006 Hero Golf Chandigarh Open, ONGC Noida Open
- 2007 BILT Open Pro-Am
