= Lam Chih Bing =

Singaporean professional golfer

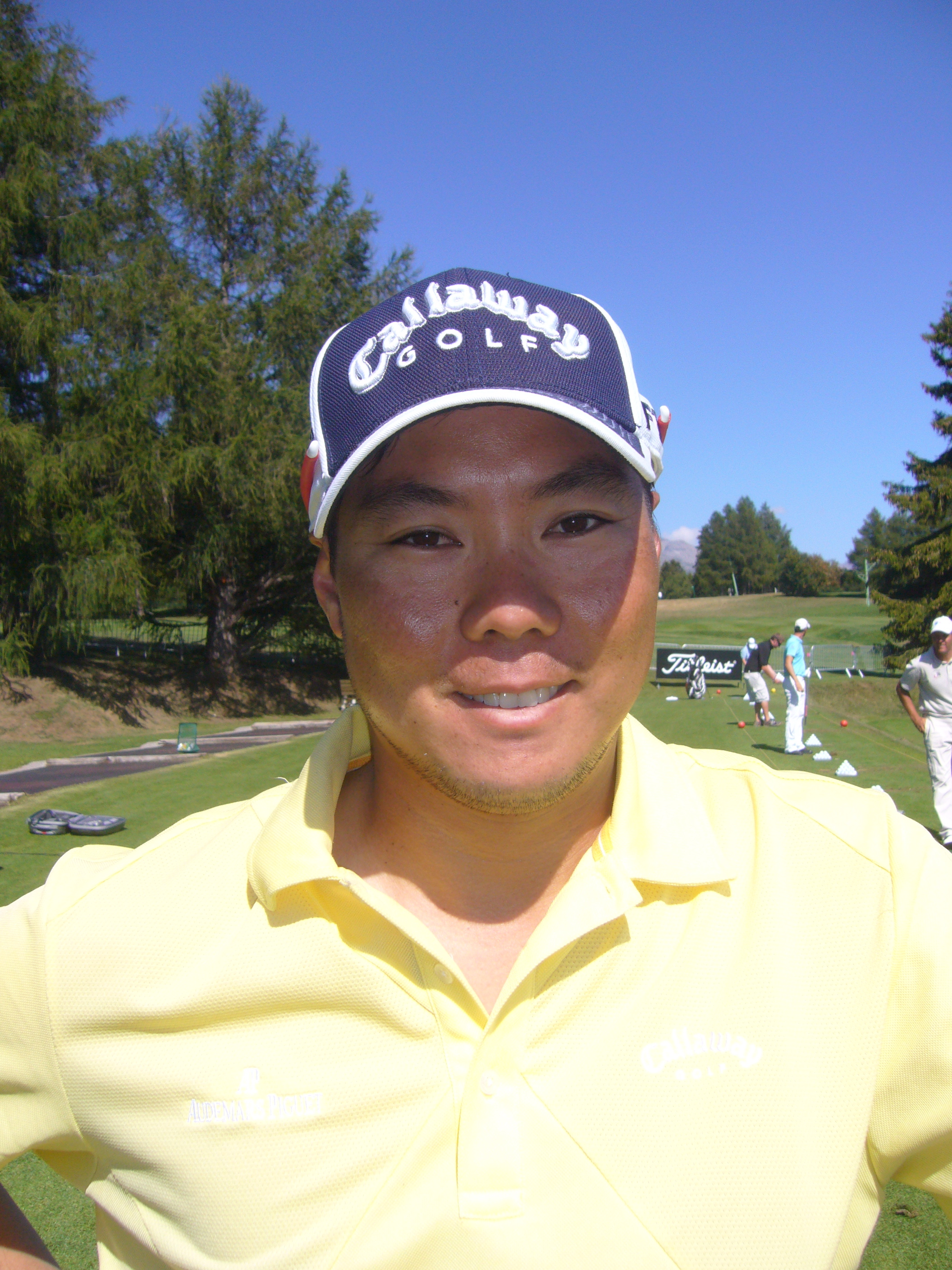

Personal information
- Nationality: Singapore
- Born: 29 December 1976 (age 49)

Career
- Sport: Golf
- College: University of Arizona; University of Leicester
- Turned professional: 1999
- Current tour: Asian Tour
- Professional wins: 10

Number of wins by tour
- Asian Tour: 1
- Other: 9

Best results in major championships
- Masters Tournament: DNP
- PGA Championship: DNP
- U.S. Open: DNP
- The Open Championship: 83rd: 2008

Lam Chih Bing (born 29 December 1976) is a Singaporean former professional golfer.

== Career ==
Lam was a scratch golfer at seventeen, and attended the University of Arizona in the United States before completing an MBA at the University of Leicester in England, following his ambition to become a fund manager. Instead he began a professional golf career, joining the Asian Tour in 2001. In his first seven seasons Lam struggled to retain his card, never finishing inside the top 60 on the Order of Merit, but 2008 was his breakthrough year, with four top-10s and a maiden tour win at the prestigious season-ending Volvo Masters of Asia.

== Professional wins (10) ==
=== Asian Tour wins (1) ===
No.	Date	Tournament	Winning score	Margin of victory	Runner-up
1	21 Dec 2008	Volvo Masters of Asia	−14 (69-66-72-67=274)	2 strokes	(Thailand) Chapchai Nirat

=== Professional Golf Tour of India wins (1) ===
No.	Date	Tournament	Winning score	Margin of victory	Runner-up
1	21 Oct 2007	BILT Open	−13 (68-66-69-72=275)	1 stroke	(India) Digvijay Singh

=== All Thailand Golf Tour wins (1) ===
- 2010 Singha Masters

=== ASEAN PGA Tour wins (1) ===
No.	Date	Tournament	Winning score	Margin of victory	Runner-up
1	17 May 2008	Mercedes-Benz Masters Indonesia	−17 (65-65-68-63=271)	3 strokes	(Philippines) Angelo Que

=== Other wins (7) ===
- 2000 PFP Classic (Malaysia), Malaysian PGA Championship
- 2001 Genting Masters (Malaysia)
- 2003 Tiger Challenge, Accenture Champion of Champions (both Singapore)
- 2008 Singapore PGA Championship

== Results in major championships ==
Tournament	2007	2008	2009	2010	2011
The Open Championship	CUT	83			CUT

Note: Lam only played in The Open Championship.

Did not play

CUT = missed the half-way cut

== Results in World Golf Championships ==
Tournament	2009
Match Play	
Championship	
Invitational	76
Champions	T60

Did not play

"T" = Tied

== Team appearances ==
Amateur

- Eisenhower Trophy (representing Singapore): 1996

Professional

- World Cup (representing Singapore): 2002, 2005, 2006, 2009, 2011
