= Nitithorn Thippong =

Thai golfer

Personal information
- Nickname: Fever
- Nationality: Thailand
- Born: 15 October 1996 (age 30)
- Height: 1.80 m (5 ft 11 in)
- Weight: 78 kg (172 lb)

Career
- Sport: Golf
- Turned professional: 2015
- Current tours: Asian Tour; All Thailand Golf Tour
- Former tour: Asian Development Tour
- Professional wins: 6

Number of wins by tour
- Asian Tour: 3
- Other: 3

Nitithorn Thippong (Thai: นิติธร ทิพย์พงษ์; born 15 October 1996) is a Thai professional golfer who plays on the Asian Tour.

== Professional career ==
Thippong turned professional in 2015.

In 2018, Thippong got his first win on the Asian Development Tour at the PGM Penang Championship in Penang, Malaysia. He finished the season second in the Order of Merit to gain a place on the Asian Tour for 2019.

In 2022, Thippong won his first Asian Tour title at the DGC Open in New Delhi, India. He beat Ajeetesh Sandhu in a playoff. Later in August 2022, Thippong won his second Asian Tour event at the International Series Singapore.

== Professional wins (6) ==
=== Asian Tour wins (3) ===
Legend
International Series (1)
Other Asian Tour (2)

No.	Date	Tournament	Winning score	Margin of victory	Runner(s)-up
1	27 Mar 2022	DGC Open^{1}	−7 (68-70-70-73=281)	Playoff	(India) Ajeetesh Sandhu
2	14 Aug 2022	International Series Singapore	−16 (68-67-68-69=272)	1 stroke	(Malaysia) Gavin Green, (Thailand) Phachara Khongwatmai, (Canada) Richard T. Lee
3	6 Aug 2023	Mandiri Indonesia Open	−18 (66-65-67-72=270)	2 strokes	(Australia) Scott Hend, (Taiwan) Lee Chieh-po, (England) Steve Lewton

^{1}Co-sanctioned by the Professional Golf Tour of India

Asian Tour playoff record (1–0)

No.	Year	Tournament	Opponent	Result
1	2022	DGC Open	(India) Ajeetesh Sandhu	Won with birdie on first extra hole

=== Asian Development Tour wins (1) ===
No.	Date	Tournament	Winning score	Margin of victory	Runners-up
1	5 May 2018	Penang Championship^{1}	−15 (70-67-67-69=273)	2 strokes	(Argentina) Miguel Ángel Carballo, (Sweden) Malcolm Kokocinski

^{1}Co-sanctioned by the Professional Golf of Malaysia Tour

=== All Thailand Golf Tour wins (1) ===
No.	Date	Tournament	Winning score	Margin of victory	Runner-up
1	16 Oct 2022	Singha Bangkok Open	−19 (65-66-64-66=261)	3 strokes	(Thailand) Chonlatit Chuenboonngam

=== Thailand PGA Tour wins (1) ===
No.	Date	Tournament	Winning score	Margin of victory	Runner-up
1	11 Nov 2017	Singha-SAT Khao Yai Championship	−16 (66-70-65-67=268)	Playoff	(Thailand) Thammanoon Sriroj
