= 2019 Professional Golf Tour of India =

Golf tour season

2019 Professional Golf Tour of India season
- Duration: 7 February 2019 – 29 December 2019
- Number of official events: 17
- Most wins: (India) S. Chikkarangappa (2) (India) Rashid Khan (2) (India) Udayan Mane (2)
- Order of Merit: (India) Rashid Khan

The 2019 Professional Golf Tour of India, titled as the 2019 Tata Steel Professional Golf Tour of India for sponsorship reasons, was the 13th season of the Professional Golf Tour of India, the main professional golf tour in India since it was formed in 2006.

== OWGR inclusion ==
In July 2018, it was announced that all Professional Golf Tour of India events, beginning in 2019, would receive Official World Golf Ranking points at the minimum level of 5 points for the winner of a 72-hole event.

== Tata Steel title sponsorship ==
In February, it was announced that the tour had signed a title sponsorship agreement with Tata Steel, being renamed as the Tata Steel Professional Golf Tour of India.

== Schedule ==
The following table lists official events during the 2019 season.

| Date | Tournament | Location | Purse (₹) | Winner (Note: The number in brackets after each winner's name is the number of Professional Golf Tour of India events they had won up to and including that tournament.) | OWGR points | Other tours (Note: ASA − Asian Tour.) |
|---|---|---|---|---|---|---|
| 9 Feb | Golconda Masters | Telangana | 4,000,000 | (India) S. Chikkarangappa (13) | 5 | |
| 15 Feb | PGTI Players Championship (Classic) | Haryana | 3,000,000 | (India) Udayan Mane (7) | 7 | |
| 9 Mar | City Bank American Express Chittagong Open | Bangladesh | 4,000,000 | (India) Rashid Khan (10) | 5 | |
| 15 Mar | Bengal Open | West Bengal | 3,000,000 | (Bangladesh) Zamal Hossain (3) | 5 | |
| 5 Apr | Pune Open Golf Championship | Maharashtra | 3,000,000 | (India) Kshitij Naveed Kaul (1) | 5 | |
| 19 Apr | Delhi-NCR Open Golf Championship | Uttar Pradesh | 3,000,000 | (India) S. Chikkarangappa (14) | 5 | |
| 10 May | Tata Steel PGTI Players Championship (Panchkula) | Haryana | 3,000,000 | (India) Mukesh Kumar (21) | 5 | |
| 17 May | Tata Steel PGTI Players Championship (Chandigarh) | Haryana | 3,000,000 | (India) Rashid Khan (11) | 5 | |
| 15 Sep | Classic Golf and Country Club International Championship | Haryana | US$300,000 | (Indonesia) Rory Hie (n/a) | 10 | ASA |
| 27 Sep | Jaipur Open | Rajasthan | 3,000,000 | (India) Priyanshu Singh (1) | 5 | |
| 20 Oct | Jeev Milkha Singh Invitational | Haryana | 15,000,000 | (India) Ajeetesh Sandhu (4) | 5 | |
| 17 Nov | Panasonic Open India | Haryana | US$400,000 | (South Korea) Tom Kim (n/a) | 10 | ASA |
| 23 Nov | IndianOil Servo Masters Golf | Assam | 6,000,000 | (India) Veer Ahlawat (1) | 5 | |
| 1 Dec | Kensville Open | Gujarat | 4,000,000 | (India) Shamim Khan (15) | 5 | |
| 15 Dec | ICC RCGC Open Golf Championship | West Bengal | 4,000,000 | (Sri Lanka) Mithun Perera (7) | 5 | |
| 20 Dec | Bengaluru Open Golf Championship | Karnataka | 4,000,000 | (India) Abhinav Lohan (1) | 5 | |
| 29 Dec | Tata Steel Tour Championship | Jharkhand | 15,000,000 | (India) Udayan Mane (8) | 5 | |

== Order of Merit ==
The Order of Merit was titled as the Tata Steel PGTI Rankings and was based on prize money won during the season, calculated in Indian rupees.

| Position | Player | Prize money (₹) |
|---|---|---|
| 1 | (India) Rashid Khan | 6,627,650 |
| 2 | (India) S. Chikkarangappa | 5,027,778 |
| 3 | (India) Udayan Mane | 3,970,300 |
| 4 | (India) Karandeep Kochhar | 3,049,222 |
| 5 | (India) Veer Ahlawat | 2,980,057 |
