= Hendrik Buhrmann =

South African professional golfer

Personal information
- Full name: Hendrik Theodor Smit Buhrmann
- Nationality: South Africa
- Born: 7 July 1963 (age 63) Vereeniging, South Africa
- Height: 1.82 m (6 ft 0 in)
- Weight: 84 kg (185 lb; 13.2 st)

Career
- Sport: Golf
- Turned professional: 1985
- Former tours: European Tour; Asian Tour; Sunshine Tour
- Professional wins: 9

Number of wins by tour
- Asian Tour: 1
- Sunshine Tour: 4
- Other: 4

Best results in major championships
- Masters Tournament: DNP
- PGA Championship: DNP
- U.S. Open: DNP
- The Open Championship: T64: 1992

Hendrik Theodor Smit Buhrmann (born 7 July 1963) is a South African professional golfer.

== Early life ==
Buhrmann was born in Vereeniging.

== Professional career ==
In 1985, Buhrmann turned professional. He won eight tournaments on the Sunshine Tour. Since 1995 he has also been a member of the Asian Tour and in 2006, after a string four second-place finishes stretching back a decade, he won for the first time on that tour at the Aamby Valley Asian Masters.

== Professional wins (9) ==
=== Asian Tour wins (1) ===
No.	Date	Tournament	Winning score	Margin of victory	Runner-up
1	14 May 2006	Aamby Valley Asian Masters	−13 (66-75-65-71=277)	2 strokes	(England) Simon Hurd

=== Sunshine Tour wins (4) ===
No.	Date	Tournament	Winning score	Margin of victory	Runner(s)-up
1	27 Nov 1994	Nashua Wild Coast Sun Challenge	−8 (64-67-72-69=272)	5 strokes	(Namibia) Trevor Dodds, (South Africa) Ernie Els
2	23 Mar 2002	FNB Botswana Open	−19 (63-65-66=194)	1 stroke	(South Africa) Brett Liddle
3	30 May 2003	Devonvale Championship	−18 (66-65-67=198)	1 stroke	(Zimbabwe) Marc Cayeux, (South Africa) Shaun Norris
4	7 May 2005	Capital Alliance Royal Swazi Sun Open	42 pts (11-7-10-14=42)	1 point	(South Africa) Ross Wellington

=== Other South African wins (4) ===
- 1991 Mercedes Benz Golf Challenge, Eastern Cape Classic, Lombard Tyres TVL Classic
- 1993 Nashua Wild Coast Sun Challenge

== Results in major championships ==
Tournament	1992
The Open Championship	T64

Note: Buhrmann only played in The Open Championship.
"T" = tied

== Team appearances ==
- World Cup (representing South Africa): 1995
- Alfred Dunhill Challenge (representing Southern Africa): 1995 (winners)
