= 2006 Asian Tour =

Golf tour season

2006 Asian Tour season
- Duration: 15 December 2005 – 10 December 2006
- Number of official events: 27
- Most wins: (South Korea) Yang Yong-eun (2)
- Order of Merit: (India) Jeev Milkha Singh
- Players' Player of the Year: (India) Jeev Milkha Singh
- Rookie of the Year: (Philippines) Juvic Pagunsan

The 2006 Asian Tour was the 12th season of the modern Asian Tour (formerly the Asian PGA Tour), the main professional golf tour in Asia (outside of Japan) since it was established in 1995.

== Schedule ==
The following table lists official events during the 2006 season.

| Date | Tournament | Host country | Purse (US$) | Winner (Note: The number in brackets after each winner's name is the number of Asian Tour events they had won up to and including that tournament. This information is only shown for Asian Tour members.) | OWGR points | Other tours (Note: AFR − Sunshine Tour; ANZ − PGA Tour of Australasia; EUR − European Tour; JPN − Japan Golf Tour; KOR − Korean Tour.) | Notes |
|---|---|---|---|---|---|---|---|
| 18 Dec | Asia Japan Okinawa Open | Japan | ¥100,000,000 | (Japan) Tadahiro Takayama (n/a) | 14 | JPN | |
| 22 Jan | Pakistan Open | Pakistan | 200,000 | (England) Chris Rodgers (1) | 14 | | New to Asian Tour |
| 29 Jan | Commercialbank Qatar Masters | Qatar | 2,000,000 | (Sweden) Henrik Stenson (n/a) | 44 | EUR | |
| 12 Feb | Johnnie Walker Classic | Australia | £1,250,000 | (United States) Kevin Stadler (n/a) | 44 | ANZ, EUR | |
| 19 Feb | Maybank Malaysian Open | Malaysia | 1,250,000 | (South Korea) Charlie Wi (7) | 20 | EUR | |
| 5 Mar | Enjoy Jakarta HSBC Indonesia Open | Indonesia | 1,000,000 | (England) Simon Dyson (4) | 20 | EUR | |
| 12 Mar | OSIM Singapore Masters | Singapore | 1,000,000 | (Singapore) Mardan Mamat (2) | 20 | EUR | |
| 19 Mar | TCL Classic | China | 1,000,000 | (Sweden) Johan Edfors (n/a) | 24 | EUR | |
| 16 Apr | Volvo China Open | China | 1,800,000 | (India) Jeev Milkha Singh (5) | 24 | EUR | |
| 23 Apr | BMW Asian Open | China | 1,800,000 | (Spain) Gonzalo Fernández-Castaño (n/a) | 30 | EUR | |
| 30 Apr | GS Caltex Maekyung Open | South Korea | ₩600,000,000 | (South Korea) Suk Jong-yul (1) | 14 | KOR | |
| 7 May | SK Telecom Open | South Korea | ₩600,000,000 | (Thailand) Prom Meesawat (1) | 14 | KOR | |
| 14 May | Aamby Valley Asian Masters | India | 400,000 | (South Africa) Hendrik Buhrmann (1) | 14 | | New tournament |
| 21 May | Macau Open | Macau | 300,000 | (Australia) Kane Webber (1) | 14 | | |
| 28 May | Philippine Open | Philippines | 200,000 | (Australia) Scott Strange (2) | 14 | | |
| 4 Jun | Bangkok Airways Open | Thailand | 300,000 | (Thailand) Chawalit Plaphol (2) | 14 | | |
| 20 Aug | Crowne Plaza Open | China | 200,000 | (Thailand) Chinnarat Phadungsil (2) | 14 | | |
| 27 Aug | Brunei Open | Brunei | 500,000 | (Taiwan) Wang Ter-chang (4) | 12 | | |
| 3 Sep | Pulai Springs Malaysian Masters | Malaysia | 300,000 | (South Africa) Anton Haig (1) | 14 | | New tournament |
| 10 Sep | Barclays Singapore Open | Singapore | 3,000,000 | (Australia) Adam Scott (n/a) | 36 | | |
| 24 Sep | Kolon-Hana Bank Korea Open | South Korea | ₩700,000,000 | (South Korea) Yang Yong-eun (1) | 16 | KOR | |
| 1 Oct | Mercuries Taiwan Masters | Taiwan | 500,000 | (India) Gaurav Ghei (2) | 14 | | |
| 8 Oct | Taiwan Open | Taiwan | 300,000 | (Taiwan) Lin Wen-tang (1) | 14 | | |
| 15 Oct | Volkswagen Masters-China | China | 350,000 | (South Africa) Retief Goosen (n/a) | 18 | | |
| 22 Oct | Hero Honda Indian Open | India | 300,000 | (India) Jyoti Randhawa (6) | 14 | | |
| 19 Nov | UBS Hong Kong Open | Hong Kong | 2,000,000 | (Spain) José Manuel Lara (n/a) | 32 | EUR | |
| 10 Dec | Volvo Masters of Asia | Thailand | 700,000 | (Thailand) Thongchai Jaidee (8) | 20 | | |

=== Unofficial events ===
The following events were sanctioned by the Asian Tour, but did not carry official money, nor were wins official.

| Date | Tournament | Host country | Purse ($) | Winner | OWGR points | Other tours | Notes |
|---|---|---|---|---|---|---|---|
| 12 Nov | HSBC Champions | China | 5,000,000 | (South Korea) Yang Yong-eun | 52 | AFR, (Note: Sunshine Tour unofficial event) ANZ, (Note: PGA Tour of Australasia unofficial event) EUR | Limited-field event |

== Order of Merit ==
The Order of Merit was based on prize money won during the season, calculated in U.S. dollars.

| Position | Player | Prize money ($) |
|---|---|---|
| 1 | (India) Jeev Milkha Singh | 591,884 |
| 2 | (Thailand) Thongchai Jaidee | 444,736 |
| 3 | (Thailand) Prom Meesawat | 392,672 |
| 4 | (South Korea) Charlie Wi | 369,881 |
| 5 | (Australia) Andrew Buckle | 348,296 |

== Awards ==
| Award | Winner | Ref. |
|---|---|---|
| Players' Player of the Year | (India) Jeev Milkha Singh | |
| Rookie of the Year | (Philippines) Juvic Pagunsan | |
