= Digvijay Singh (golfer) =

Indian professional golfer (born 1972)

Personal information
- Full name: Digvijay Singh Chahal
- Nationality: India
- Born: 30 January 1972 (age 54) New Delhi, India
- Spouse: Chitra Sarwara

Career
- Sport: Golf
- Turned professional: 1999
- Current tours: Professional Golf Tour of India; Asian Tour
- Professional wins: 13

Number of wins by tour
- Asian Tour: 1
- Other: 12

Digvijay Singh Chahal (born 30 January 1972) is a professional golfer from India currently playing on the Professional Golf Tour of India and the Asian Tour.

== Early life and amateur career ==
In 1972, Singh was born in New Delhi to an Indian Army officer (Col Niranjan Singh). His sister Chitrangada Singh is an actress. He had a solid amateur campaign, winning the Sri Lankan Amateur Championship in 1996 and 1997.

He represented India in the Eisenhower Trophy in 1996 and 1998, and in the Nomura Cup in 1995 and 1997. He also played in the Asian Games in Bangkok in 1998.

== Professional career ==
In 1999, Singh turned professional. Singh currently holds 12 career wins on the PGTI, where he has had most of his success. He played his first full season on the Asian Tour in 2008 after 8 previous attempts to obtain his card. He enjoyed a 4th-place finish in his debut event in 2008 at the Indian Masters. He finished 2008 with $186,000 in earnings and a 30th-place finish on the Order of Merit.

Singh won the DDA Open in 2006 after Ashok Kumar made a crucial mistake on the 16th hole on Sunday. His first win on the PGTI came in 2008 at the Players Championship. It was his first professional win in over 2 years and 12th professional win.

== Personal life ==
Singh is married to Chitra Sarwara, the daughter of former Haryana revenue minister Nirmal Singh, herself being an international volleyball player and currently serving as the municipal corporator for Ambala Nagar Nigam in Haryana.

Jyoti Randhawa is Singh's former brother-in-law. His sister Bollywood actress Chitrangada Singh was married to Randhawa before they were divorced. Randhawa introduced Singh to the game at age 17 and he is the one who encouraged Singh to turn professional.

== Amateur wins ==
- 1996 Sri Lankan Amateur
- 1997 Sri Lankan Amateur

== Professional wins (13) ==
=== Asian Tour wins (1) ===
No.	Date	Tournament	Winning score	Margin of victory	Runners-up
1	1 Apr 2012	Panasonic Open India^{1}	−11 (70-73-68-66=277)	2 strokes	(India) Gaganjeet Bhullar, (Bangladesh) Siddikur Rahman

^{1}Co-sanctioned by the Professional Golf Tour of India

=== Professional Golf Tour of India wins (2) ===
No.	Date	Tournament	Winning score	Margin of victory	Runner(s)-up
1	23 Aug 2008	PGTI Players Championship (Coimbatore)	−5 (68-69-73-73=283)	1 stroke	(India) Rahul Ganapathy
2	1 Apr 2012	Panasonic Open India^{1}	−11 (70-73-68-66=277)	2 strokes	(India) Gaganjeet Bhullar, (Bangladesh) Siddikur Rahman

^{1}Co-sanctioned by the Asian Tour

=== Other wins ===
This list is incomplete

- 2000 BPGC Open
- 2002 Royal Springs Open, ColorPlus Open
- 2003 Surya Nepal Masters
- 2004 SRF All-India Matchplay Championship
- 2005 Airtel Masters
- 2006 DDA Open

== Team appearances ==
Amateur

- Nomura Cup (representing India): 1995, 1997
- Eisenhower Trophy (representing India): 1996, 1998

Professional

- World Cup (representing India): 2003
