= Handa Singapore Classic =

ISPS Handa Singapore Classic
Tournament information
- Location: Singapore
- Established: 2010
- Course: Orchid Country Club
- Par: 70
- Length: 6,843 yards (6,257 m)
- Tour: Asian Tour
- Format: Stroke play
- Prize fund: US$400,000
- Month played: April
- Final year: 2012

Tournament record score
- Aggregate: 267 Peter Karmis (2010)
- To par: −21 as above

Final champion
- (Australia) Scott Hend
- Location in Singapore

The ISPS Handa Singapore Classic was a golf tournament on the Asian Tour from 2010 to 2012 at the Orchid Country Club in Singapore. It was played for the first time in September 2010. The purse was US$400,000 in 2010 and 2012 and US$300,000 in 2011.

== Winners ==
| Year | Winner | Score | To par | Margin of victory | Runner(s)-up |
ISPS Handa Singapore Classic
| 2012 | (Australia) Scott Hend | 199 (Note: Shortened to 54 holes due to weather.) | −11 | 1 stroke | (Spain) Javier Colomo (United States) David Lipsky (Taiwan) Lu Wei-chih (Sri Lanka) Mithun Perera |
| 2011 | (India) Himmat Rai | 271 | −9 | Playoff | (Brazil) Adilson da Silva (Philippines) Elmer Salvador (Netherlands) Guido van der Valk (South Africa) Tjaart van der Walt |
Handa Singapore Classic
| 2010 | (South Africa) Peter Karmis | 267 | −21 | 2 strokes | (South Africa) Jbe' Kruger |
