= Shiv Chawrasia =

Indian professional golfer (born 1978)

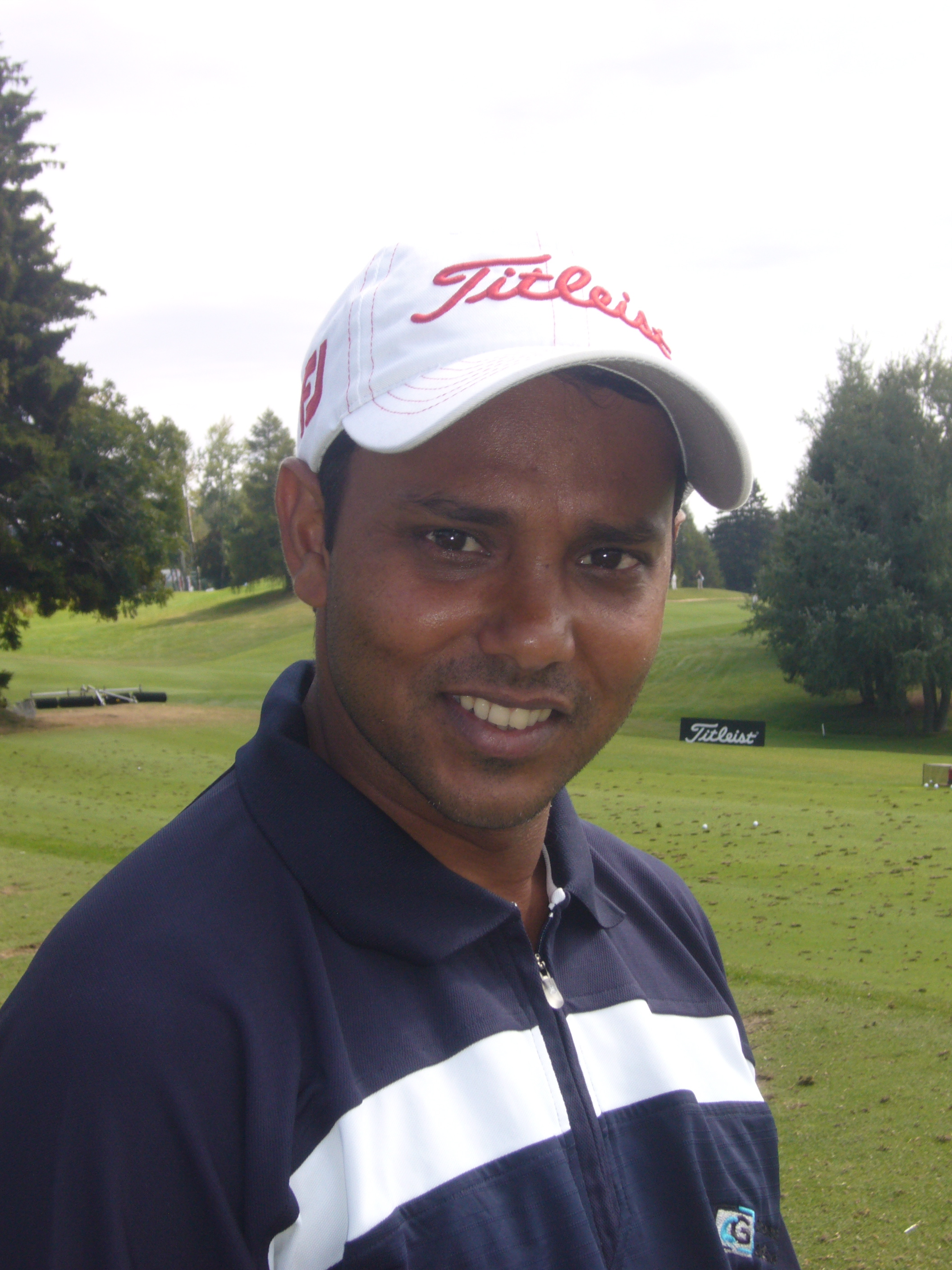

Personal information
- Full name: Shiv Shankar Prasad Chawrasia
- Nicknames: SSP, Chipputtsia, The Battleship
- Nationality: India
- Born: 15 May 1978 (age 48) Kolkata, India
- Height: 5 ft 5 in (1.65 m)
- Spouse: Simantini Prasad Chawrasia (divorced)

Career
- Sport: Golf
- Turned professional: 1997
- Current tours: European Tour; Asian Tour
- Professional wins: 18

Number of wins by tour
- European Tour: 4
- Asian Tour: 6
- Other: 12

Shiv Shankar Prasad Chawrasia (born 15 May 1978), commonly known as S.S.P. Chawrasia, is an Indian professional golfer. Since 2008 he has won six Asian Tour events, four of which were co-sanctioned by the European Tour. He has had particular success in the Hero Indian Open where he was runner-up in 1999, 2006, 2013 and 2015 and winner in 2016 and 2017. Nearly all his success has been in India; his only win outside India being the 2016 Resorts World Manila Masters. At the end of the 2014 season he asked the Asian Tour to change the spelling of his last name, previously Chowrasia, to Chawrasia, the spelling that is on his passport.

== Early life ==
Chawrasia's father worked as the greenskeeper at the Royal Calcutta Golf Club in Kolkata, India. It was at this golf course that Chawrasia picked up golf at the age of 10. The self-taught golfer is nicknamed "Chip-putt-sia" because of his short game.

== Professional career ==
Before entering professional golf, he was a caddie for a few years. After entering professional golf in 1997, his earnings at the end of 1998 were $1,220. Chawrasia finished second to Arjun Atwal in the 1999 Indian Open held at the Royal Calcutta Golf Club.

He joined the Asian Tour in 2006 after making steady progress in India with cumulative earnings being $36,983 along with eight Indian Tour titles.

His first season in the Asian Tour had a good opening event in the Pakistan Open, top-20 finishes in Philippine Open and in China. This was followed up with a top-10 finish at Bangkok Airways Open. At the Mercuries Masters in Taiwan, he led the field by five shots at the halfway mark, but was disqualified for forgetting to sign his scorecard. At the 2006 Hero Honda Indian Open, he narrowly missed out on winning the title. The title that won by Jyoti Randhawa, was decided by a play-off. He ended 2006 with a tenth place in Volvo Masters.

After being one stroke behind the leader on the opening day of the 2007 Malaysian Open, he lost ground and ended up finishing tied for 16th at the end of the tournament. His Asian Tour ranking improved from 38 in 2006 to 32 in 2007.

In February 2008, he won the inaugural Indian Masters, which was a part of the 2008 European Tour. The event, which he won with a score of nine under par, earned him £239,705, which doubled his earnings over the past decade. He was the only player to achieve sub-par rounds on all four days in this, the biggest golf event in India. Chawrasia, ranked 388 in the world before the tournament, obtained a two-year exemption on the European Tour. After Jeev Milkha Singh and Arjun Atwal, he became the third Indian golfer to win on the European Tour. Shortly after his victory, not only was he ranked 161 in the Official World Golf Ranking, but also he topped the Asian Tour Order of Merit.

In February 2011, Chawrasia won his second Asian Tour event, the Avantha Masters in New Delhi. Since then he has won the Panasonic Open India in 2014, the Hero Indian Open and the Resorts World Manila Masters in 2016 and the Hero Indian Open for the second time in 2017.

Chawrasia qualified for the 2016 Summer Olympics as the second highest ranked Indian player, representing India along with Anirban Lahiri.

== Awards ==
In August 2017, he was awarded the Arjuna Award by the Ministry of Youth Affairs and Sports, Government of India.

== Professional wins (18) ==
=== European Tour wins (4) ===
No.	Date	Tournament	Winning score	Margin of victory	Runner(s)-up
1	10 Feb 2008	Emaar-MGF Indian Masters^{1}	−9 (70-71-71-67=279)	2 strokes	(Republic of Ireland) Damien McGrane
2	20 Feb 2011	Avantha Masters^{1} (2)*	−15 (70-69-67-67=273)	1 stroke	(England) Robert Coles
3	20 Mar 2016	Hero Indian Open^{1}	−15 (67-67-68-71=273)	2 strokes	(India) Anirban Lahiri, (South Korea) Wang Jeung-hun
4	12 Mar 2017	Hero Indian Open^{1} (2)	−10 (72-67-68-71=278)	7 strokes	(Malaysia) Gavin Green

*Note: The European Tour considers the Avantha Masters to be a continuation of the Emaar-MGF Indian Masters, however the Asian Tour does not share this view.
^{1}Co-sanctioned by the Asian Tour

European Tour playoff record (0–1)

No.	Year	Tournament	Opponent	Result
1	2015	Hero Indian Open	(India) Anirban Lahiri	Lost to birdie on first extra hole

=== Asian Tour wins (6) ===
No.	Date	Tournament	Winning score	Margin of victory	Runner(s)-up
1	10 Feb 2008	Emaar-MGF Indian Masters^{1}	−9 (70-71-71-67=279)	2 strokes	(Republic of Ireland) Damien McGrane
2	20 Feb 2011	Avantha Masters^{1}	−15 (70-69-67-67=273)	1 stroke	(England) Robert Coles
3	9 Nov 2014	Panasonic Open India^{2}	−12 (70-71-69-66=276)	Playoff	(India) Rahil Gangjee, (Sri Lanka) Mithun Perera
4	20 Mar 2016	Hero Indian Open^{1}	−15 (67-67-68-71=273)	2 strokes	(India) Anirban Lahiri, (South Korea) Wang Jeung-hun
5	20 Nov 2016	Resorts World Manila Masters	−19 (68-64-71-66=269)	Playoff	(United States) Sam Chien, (Malaysia) Nicholas Fung
6	12 Mar 2017	Hero Indian Open^{1} (2)	−10 (72-67-68-71=278)	7 strokes	(Malaysia) Gavin Green

^{1}Co-sanctioned by the European Tour
^{2}Co-sanctioned by the Professional Golf Tour of India

Asian Tour playoff record (2–2)

No.	Year	Tournament	Opponent(s)	Result
1	2006	Hero Honda Indian Open	(India) Vijay Kumar, (India) Jyoti Randhawa	Randhawa won with birdie on second extra hole Kumar eliminated by par on first hole
2	2014	Panasonic Open India	(India) Rahil Gangjee, (Sri Lanka) Mithun Perera	Won with birdie on first extra hole
3	2015	Hero Indian Open	(India) Anirban Lahiri	Lost to birdie on first extra hole
4	2016	Resorts World Manila Masters	(United States) Sam Chien, (Malaysia) Nicholas Fung	Won with birdie on second extra hole Fung eliminated by birdie on first hole

=== Professional Golf Tour of India wins (4) ===
No.	Date	Tournament	Winning score	Margin of victory	Runner(s)-up
1	10 Nov 2006	Tata Open	−15 (72-64-67-64=267)	4 strokes	(India) Vivek Bhandari, (India) Naman Dawar
2	13 Mar 2010	Solaris Chemtech Open Golf Championship	−13 (69-68-73-65=275)	1 stroke	(India) R. Murthy
3	1 Dec 2012	McLeod Russel Tour Championship	−9 (72-70-69-68=279)	1 stroke	(India) Shamim Khan
4	9 Nov 2014	Panasonic Open India^{1}	−12 (70-71-69-66=276)	Playoff	(India) Rahil Gangjee, (Sri Lanka) Mithun Perera

^{1}Co-sanctioned by the Asian Tour

=== PGA of India Tour wins (9) ===
- 2001 Singhania Open
- 2003 HT Pro Golf, Tata Open, Hero Honda Open, NGC Open
- 2005 Singhania Open, Tata Open
- 2006 Singhania Open, Hindu Open

== Results in World Golf Championships ==
Results not in chronological order before 2015.

Tournament	2008	2009	2010	2011	2012	2013	2014	2015	2016	2017
Championship	T51			T49						
Match Play										
Invitational										
Champions				65				T46		T31

Did not play

"T" = Tied
Note that the HSBC Champions did not become a WGC event until 2009.

== Team appearances ==
Professional

- EurAsia Cup (representing Asia): 2016, 2018
- World Cup (representing India): 2016

== See also ==
- 2019 European Tour Qualifying School graduates
- List of golfers with most Asian Tour wins
