= Himmat Rai =

Indian professional golfer (born 1987)

Personal information
- Full name: Himmat Singh Rai
- Nationality: India
- Born: 18 May 1987 (age 39)

Career
- Sport: Golf
- Turned professional: 2007
- Current tour: Asian Tour
- Former tour: Professional Golf Tour of India
- Professional wins: 4

Number of wins by tour
- Asian Tour: 1
- Other: 3

Himmat Singh Rai (born 18 May 1987) is an Indian professional golfer.

== Career ==
In 2011, Rai won the ISPS Handa Singapore Classic.

== Professional wins (4) ==
=== Asian Tour wins (1) ===
No.	Date	Tournament	Winning score	Margin of victory	Runners-up
1	11 Sep 2011	ISPS Handa Singapore Classic	−9 (68-66-66-71=271)	Playoff	(Brazil) Adilson da Silva, (Philippines) Elmer Salvador, (Netherlands) Guido van der Valk, (South Africa) Tjaart van der Walt

Asian Tour playoff record (1–1)

No.	Year	Tournament	Opponents	Result
1	2011	ISPS Handa Singapore Classic	(Brazil) Adilson da Silva, (Philippines) Elmer Salvador, (Netherlands) Guido van der Valk, (South Africa) Tjaart van der Walt	Won with birdie on sixth extra hole da Silva, van der Valk and van der Walt eliminated by birdie on second hole
2	2015	Ho Tram Open	(Spain) Sergio García, (Taiwan) Lin Wen-tang, (Thailand) Thaworn Wiratchant	García won with par on second extra hole Lin and Wiratchant eliminated by birdie on first hole

=== Professional Golf Tour of India wins (2) ===
No.	Date	Tournament	Winning score	Margin of victory	Runner-up
1	6 Feb 2009	PGTI Players Championship (Tollygunge)	−9 (65-70-67-69=271)	2 strokes	(India) Sanjay Kumar
2	1 Oct 2011	DLF Masters	−4 (72-69-71-72=284)	1 stroke	(India) Rashid Khan

=== Jamega Pro Golf Tour wins (1) ===
No.	Date	Tournament	Winning score	Margin of victory	Runner-up
1	13 Aug 2013	The Players Club	−3 (66-71=137)	1 stroke	(England) James Ruth
