= Professional Golf Tour of India =

- Current season, competition or edition: 2026–27 Professional Golf Tour of India
- Formerly: Aircel Professional Golf Tour of India; Tata Steel Professional Golf Tour of India
- Sport: Golf
- Founded: 2006
- First season: 2006–07
- Country: Based in India (Note: Schedules have also included events in Bangladesh, Nepal and Sri Lanka.)
- Most titles: Order of Merit titles: (India) Rashid Khan (3); Tournament wins: (India) Mukesh Kumar (21)
- Website: www.pgtofindia.com

The Professional Golf Tour of India (PGTI), currently titled as the DP World Professional Golf Tour of India for sponsorship reasons, is a professional golf tour for men based in India. The tour was formed in 2006, as the successor to the Indian PGA Golf Tour, which ran from 1997 to 2006.

The PGTI serves as a feeder tour for higher level tours such as the Asian Tour. Many Indian players have become members of the Asian Tour, while a small number have joined the world's leading two tours, the European Tour and the United States–based PGA Tour.

The PGTI became a member of the International Federation of PGA Tours in 2009, but its events did not carry Official World Golf Ranking points unless they were co-sanctioned by tours that are included in the world ranking system. In July 2018, the OWGR announced that the PGTI would receive world ranking points in its own right beginning in 2019.

== History ==
India's Royal Calcutta Golf Club was founded in 1829 and is usually regarded as the oldest outside the United Kingdom. In the early years Indian golf with dominated by British players and it was not until 1949 that Mohinder Bal became the first Indian to win the All-India Amateur Championship. The Indian Golf Union (IGU) was founded in 1955 to take over responsibility for Indian Golf, which had previously been largely in the hands of the Royal Calcutta Golf Club. The sport was still dominated by amateurs at that point, but most of them were now Indian.

In 1957 the IGU started a training program for caddies and professionals. In 1964 the Indian Open (open to both amateurs and professionals), was established and it soon replaced the All-India Amateur as the leading golf tournament in the country. Australian and five time British Open champion Peter Thomson used to stop over in India on his way from Australia to Europe, and he won the championship in 1964, 1966 and 1976. P. G. Sethi (an amateur) was the first Indian to win this tournament in 1965. In 1970 the Indian Open became part of the Asia Golf Circuit, the predecessor of the Asian Tour. In 1991 Ali Sher (a professional golfer) won the Indian Open, which made professional golf a much more attractive career option in India.

The Professional Golfers Association of India was founded in 1988 and several additional professional events were founded in India in the 1990s. From 1997 to 2006, the PGA of India Tour was managed by Tiger Sports Marketing on behalf of the PGA of India. Total prize money for the 2004/05 season was ₹30,500,000 (US$698,260 at 31 December 2004 exchange rate). There were around 20 events in the season, including tournaments in Nepal, Bangladesh and Sri Lanka.

In October 2006 a group of leading Indian golfers including Jyoti Randhawa and Gaurav Ghei announced that they were setting up a new tour. This followed a dispute between the Professional Golfers Association of India and Tiger Sports Marketing, the organisers of the PGA of India Tour. The BBC reported that it was not clear whether this tour would simply take the place of the existing tour, or whether rival tours might develop. In the event, the new tour, the Professional Golf Tour of India, took over as India's sole domestic professional tour, though Tiger Sports Marketing remained involved in other aspects of Indian golf.

The PGTI's schedule expanded rapidly in its first few seasons. In 2010 there were twenty-five events on the main schedule, including two co-sanctioned with the Asian Tour and one co-sanctioned with the European Tour, plus seven events on the Feeder Tour, which debuted that year. In 2011 the tour co-sanctioned an event with the European Tour's developmental circuit, the Challenge Tour, for the first time.

In December 2022, it was announced by the European Tour that the Professional Golf Tour of India had entered into a partnership with them and the PGA Tour. As part of the partnership, the leading player on the PGTI Order of Merit was given status onto the European Tour for the following season.

In February 2026, it was announced that the tour had signed a title sponsorship agreement with DP World, being renamed as the DP World Professional Golf Tour of India.

== Order of Merit winners ==
=== Professional Golf Tour of India ===
Season	Winner	Prize money (₹)
2026	(India) Saptak Talwar	10,247,684
2025	(India) Yuvraj Sandhu	19,167,100
2024	(India) Veer Ahlawat	15,635,724
2023	(India) Om Prakash Chouhan	11,826,059
2022	(India) Manu Gandas	8,850,688
2020–21	(India) Udayan Mane	5,872,275
2019	(India) Rashid Khan (3)	6,627,650
2018	(India) Khalin Joshi	6,281,340
2017	(India) Shamim Khan (2)	5,164,233
2016	(India) Rashid Khan (2)	4,479,880
2015	(India) S. Chikkarangappa	4,887,440
2014	(India) Shankar Das	5,432,067
2013	(India) Rashid Khan	4,638,284
2012	(India) Shamim Khan	5,747,713
2011	(India) Chiragh Kumar	3,706,821
2010	(India) Ashok Kumar (2)	5,394,125
2009	(India) Anirban Lahiri	3,657,853
2007–08	(India) Mukesh Kumar	3,431,992
2006–07	(India) Ashok Kumar	4,417,875

=== PGA of India Tour ===
Season	Winner	Prize money (₹)	Ref.
Aamby Valley PGAI Tour
2005–06	(India) Mukesh Kumar (5)	1,721,795	
2004–05	(India) Mukesh Kumar (4)	2,626,350	
Hero Honda Golf Tour
2003–04	(India) Ashok Kumar	1,253,710	
2002–03	(India) Mukesh Kumar (3)	2,177,402	
2001–02	(India) Mukesh Kumar (2)	1,751,425	
Wills Sport Golf Tour
2000–01	(India) Mukesh Kumar	1,300,685	
1999–00	(India) Vijay Kumar (3)	1,185,124	
1998–99	(India) Vijay Kumar (2)	1,341,564	
Indian PGA Golf Tour
1997–98	(India) Vijay Kumar		

== See also ==
- Indian Golf Premier League
