= Frankie Miñoza =

Filipino professional golfer (born 1959)

Personal information
- Full name: Francisco Miñoza
- Nationality: Philippines
- Born: 29 December 1959 (age 66)
- Height: 1.77 m (5 ft 10 in)
- Weight: 73 kg (161 lb; 11.5 st)

Career
- Sport: Golf
- Turned professional: 1983
- Current tour: Japan PGA Senior Tour
- Former tours: Japan Golf Tour; Asian Tour; Asia Golf Circuit; Philippine Golf Tour; European Senior Tour
- Professional wins: 34
- Highest ranking: 43 (2 August 1998)

Number of wins by tour
- Japan Golf Tour: 7
- Asian Tour: 1
- Other: 26

Best results in major championships
- Masters Tournament: CUT: 1991
- PGA Championship: WD: 1997
- U.S. Open: DNP
- The Open Championship: T52: 1998

Achievements and awards
- Asia Golf Circuit Order of Merit winner: 1990, 1997–98

Francisco "Frankie" Miñoza (born 29 December 1959) is a Filipino professional golfer.

== Career ==
Miñoza has played extensively in Asia, winning a number of tournaments on the leading Asian and Japanese tours in addition to many lesser events on the local circuits, especially in the Philippines and Malaysia. In 1990 he won three times on the Asia Golf Circuit and topped the tour's Order of Merit. He spent most of the following years, and had his most notable successes, on the Japan Golf Tour.

In 1998 Minoza featured in the top 50 of the Official World Golf Ranking having recorded several top finishes in Japan, including a victory in the Asia Circuit co-sanctioned Kirin Open. He also won three other tournaments on the Asia Circuit, and captured the Order of Merit for the second time.

In 2005, after losing his Japanese tour card, he joined the Asian Tour for the first time since its formal establishment in 1995. He finished 27th on the Asian money list to retain his card and also regained his Japan Golf Tour card by finishing second at the qualifying school. In 2007 he won his second Philippine Open at the age of 46 to claim his first Asian Tour title.

In November 2010, Miñoza earned his 2011 Champions Tour card by finishing second at qualifying school.

In 2026, he remains active and takes part at the Philippine Golf Tour.

== Professional wins (34) ==
=== Japan Golf Tour wins (7) ===
No.	Date	Tournament	Winning score	Margin of victory	Runner(s)-up
1	22 Apr 1990	Dunlop Open^{1}	−11 (70-68-67=205) (Note: Shortened to 54 holes due to weather.)	Playoff	(Japan) Teruo Sugihara
2	22 Aug 1993	Maruman Open	−16 (66-71-66-69=272)	Playoff	(Taiwan) Chen Tze-chung
3	6 Aug 1995	Sanko Grand Summer Championship	−21 (68-68-67-64=267)	4 strokes	(Japan) Shinji Ikeuchi
4	10 Dec 1995	Daikyo Open	−11 (68-69-67-69=273)	2 strokes	(Japan) Tōru Nakamura
5	26 Apr 1998	Kirin Open^{1} (2)	−5 (71-66-69-73=279)	1 stroke	(Japan) Hidemichi Tanaka, (Japan) Tsukasa Watanabe, (United States) Brian Watts
6	6 May 2001	Fujisankei Classic	−8 (71-68-71-66=276)	1 stroke	(Japan) Tsukasa Watanabe
7	28 Oct 2007	ABC Championship	−14 (69-64-71-70=274)	Playoff	(South Korea) Lee Dong-hwan

^{1}Co-sanctioned by the Asia Golf Circuit

Japan Golf Tour playoff record (3–1)

No.	Year	Tournament	Opponent	Result
1	1990	Dunlop Open	(Japan) Teruo Sugihara	Won with birdie on second extra hole
2	1993	Maruman Open	(Taiwan) Chen Tze-chung	Won with birdie on second extra hole
3	2001	Dydo Drinco Shizuoka Open	(Japan) Eiji Mizoguchi	Lost to par on first extra hole
4	2007	ABC Championship	(South Korea) Lee Dong-hwan	Won with birdie on first extra hole

=== Asian Tour wins (1) ===
No.	Date	Tournament	Winning score	Margin of victory	Runner-up
1	4 Feb 2007	Philippine Open	−10 (73-67-67-71=278)	2 strokes	(Philippines) Gerald Rosales

=== Asia Golf Circuit wins (10) ===
No.	Date	Tournament	Winning score	Margin of victory	Runner(s)-up
1	23 Mar 1986	Indonesia Open	−10 (69-68-67-66=270)	1 stroke	(Taiwan) Hsieh Yu-shu
2	17 Apr 1988	Maekyung Open	−9 (70-72-67-70=279)	1 stroke	(South Korea) Lim Jin-han
3	5 Mar 1989	Pakistan Open	−2 (74-77-65-70=286)	1 stroke	(United States) Tray Tyner
4	24 Mar 1990	Indonesia Open (2)	−5 (69-69-66-71=275)	3 strokes	(Canada) Rick Gibson, (Canada) Danny Mijovic
5	8 Apr 1990	Sanyang Republic of China Open	−5 (75-69-68-71=283)	Playoff	(United States) John Morse
6	22 Apr 1990	Dunlop Open^{1}	−11 (70-68-67=205)	Playoff	(Japan) Teruo Sugihara
7	15 Feb 1998	Ericsson Philippine Masters	−10 (69-67-70-72=278)	Playoff	(Philippines) Rodrigo Cuello
8	1 Mar 1998	Rolex Masters	−15 (68-69-67-69=273)	1 stroke	(Canada) Jim Rutledge
9	22 Mar 1998	Philippine Open	−10 (66-69-71-72=278)	2 strokes	(United States) Christian Chernock
10	26 Apr 1998	Kirin Open^{1} (2)	−5 (71-66-69-73=279)	1 stroke	(Japan) Hidemichi Tanaka, (Japan) Tsukasa Watanabe, (United States) Brian Watts

^{1}Co-sanctioned by the PGA of Japan Tour

Asia Golf Circuit playoff record (3–1)

No.	Year	Tournament	Opponent	Result
1	1990	Epson Singapore Open	(Philippines) Antolin Fernando	Lost to par on second extra hole
2	1990	Sanyang Republic of China Open	(United States) John Morse	Won with birdie on first extra hole
3	1990	Dunlop Open	(Japan) Teruo Sugihara	Won with birdie on second extra hole
4	1998	Ericsson Philippine Masters	(Philippines) Rodrigo Cuello	Won with birdie on first extra hole

=== Philippine Golf Tour wins (6) ===
No.	Date	Tournament	Winning score	Margin of victory	Runner(s)-up
1	10 Jul 2009	ICTSI Pueblo de Oro Championship	−7 (70-69-70=209)	1 stroke	(Philippines) Richard Sinfuego
2	25 Nov 2011	ICTSI Wack Wack Championship	−1 (72-73-70=215)	Playoff	(Philippines) Rufino Bayron, (Philippines) Elmer Saban
3	10 Feb 2013	TCC Invitational	+3 (68-73-64-78=283)	Playoff	(Philippines) Jay Bayron, (Philippines) Rufino Bayron
4	5 Jul 2013	ICTSI Del Monte Championship	−13 (70-70-63=203)	5 strokes	(Philippines) Johvanie Abaño, (Philippines) James Ryan Lam, (Philippines) Antonio Lascuña, (Philippines) Elmer Salvador, (Philippines) Miguel Tabuena
5	12 Jul 2013	ICTSI Pueblo de Oro Championship (2)	−18 (67-64-67=198)	5 strokes	(Philippines) Elmer Salvador
6	16 Jul 2016	ICTSI Negros Occidental Classic	−15 (70-65-63-67=265)	Playoff	(Philippines) Miguel Tabuena

=== Other wins (9) ===
- 1988 Perak Masters (Malaysia), Genting Classic (Malaysia), PFP Classic (Malaysia),
- 1989 Royal Johor Golf Classic (Malaysia), Sabah Masters, Perak Masters (Malaysia), Rothmans Malaysian Masters
- 1990 Rothmans Malaysian Masters
- 1993 Philippine Masters

=== Japan PGA Senior Tour wins (3) ===
No.	Date	Tournament	Winning score	Margin of victory	Runner(s)-up
1	10 Sep 2011	Komatsu Open	−10 (68-68-70=206)	Playoff	(Japan) Takashi Miyoshi
2	28 Oct 2012	Japan Senior Open	−4 (69-72-72-71=284)	1 stroke	(Japan) Kōki Idoki, (Japan) Kiyoshi Murota, (Japan) Tsuneyuki Nakajima
3	31 Aug 2013	ISPS Handa Cup Autumn Sunny Senior Masters	−5 (69-70=139)	1 stroke	(Japan) Ikuo Shirahama

== Playoff record ==
European Senior Tour playoff record (0–1)

No.	Year	Tournament	Opponent	Result
1	2010	Aberdeen Brunei Senior Masters	(Thailand) Boonchu Ruangkit	Lost to par on second extra hole

== Results in major championships ==
Tournament	1991	1992	1993	1994	1995	1996	1997	1998
Masters Tournament	CUT							
The Open Championship								T52
PGA Championship							WD	

Note: Miñoza never played in the U.S. Open.

Did not play

CUT = missed the half-way cut
WD = withdrew
"T" = tied

== Results in World Golf Championships ==
Tournament	1999
Match Play	R64
Championship	
Invitational	

Did not play

QF, R16, R32, R64 = Round in which player lost in match play

== Team appearances ==
Amateur

- Eisenhower Trophy (representing the Philippines): 1980, 1982

Professional

- World Cup (representing the Philippines): 1983, 1989, 1990, 1992, 1995
- Dunhill Cup (representing the Philippines): 1987, 1988
