= Guido van der Valk =

Dutch professional golfer (born 1980)

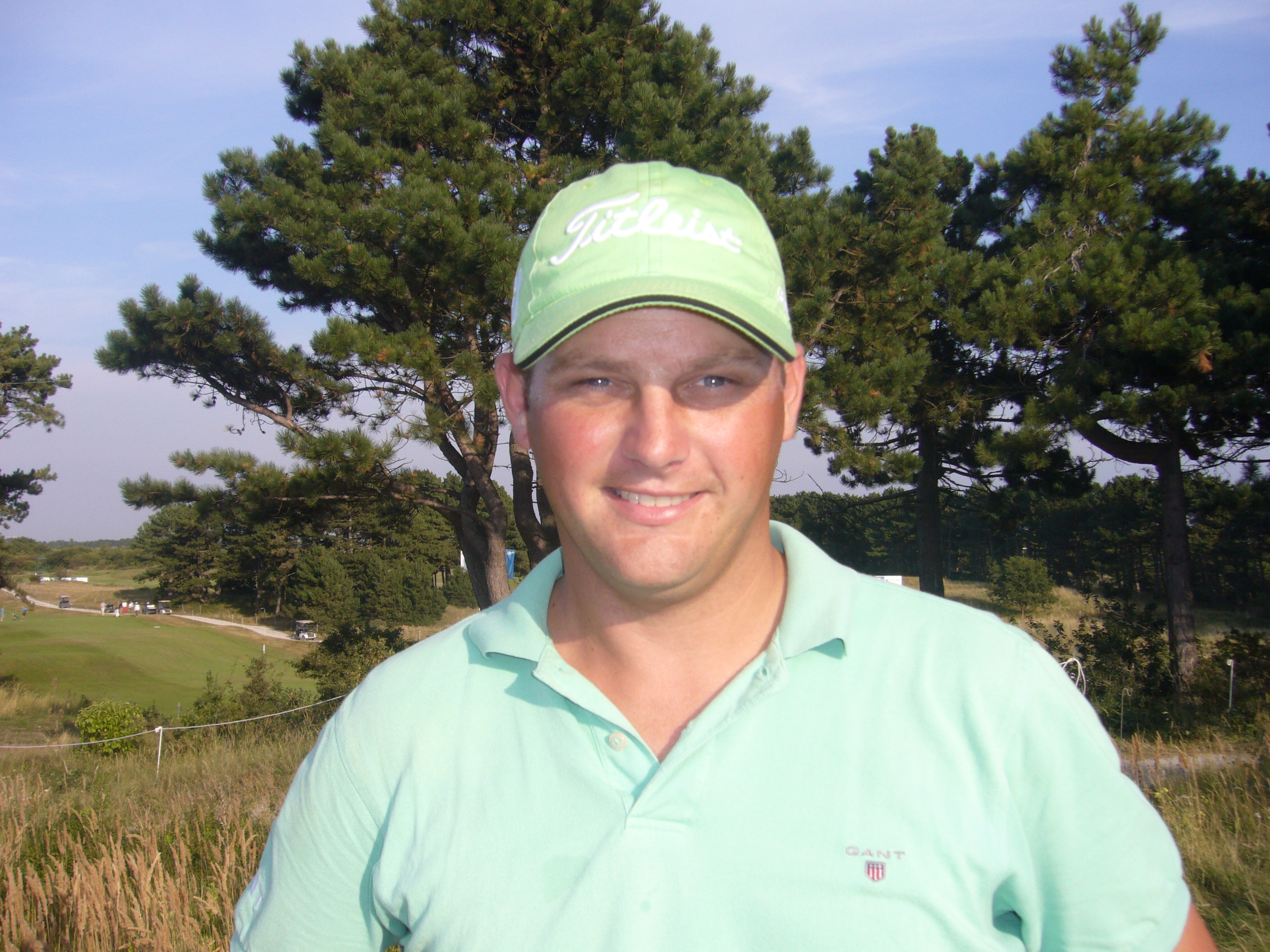

Personal information
- Nationality: Netherlands
- Born: 26 January 1980 (age 46) Lelystad, Netherlands
- Height: 5 ft 10 in (1.78 m)
- Weight: 158 lb (72 kg; 11.3 st)

Career
- Sport: Golf
- Turned professional: 2002
- Current tour: Philippine Golf Tour
- Former tours: Asian Tour; Challenge Tour; Asian Development Tour
- Professional wins: 10

Guido van der Valk (born 26 January 1980) is a Dutch professional golfer.

== Amateur career ==
Van der Valk had a successful amateur career. He represented The Netherlands in the Eisenhower Trophy. Van der Valk turned had several offers for athletic scholarships in the United States but rejected them to turn professional.

== Professional career ==
In 2002, van der Valk turned professional. He joined the Challenge Tour and finished 36th in the standings in his debut season, the highlight being a second-place finish behind Iain Pyman at the BMW Russian Open. After two disappointing seasons he joined the Asian Tour in 2005. In 2007 he just missed out on retaining his card by finishing one place out at 61st in the Order of Merit; Thammanoon Sriroj in 60th earned just $455 more. However, van der Valk rectified this the following year by enjoying his most successful Asian season to date in 2008, finishing 52nd on the Order of Merit.

In 2011, van der Valk posted his best result to date on the Asian Tour, losing out in a five-man playoff to Himmat Rai at the ISPS Handa Singapore Classic. Two weeks later he won on the Asian Development Tour at the PGM-MIDF KLGCC Classic. Going into the final event of the main tour season, the Thailand Golf Championship, he was 83rd on the Order of Merit, but he finished T6th to climb to 59th and retain his card. It was the first time he had retained his card automatically since 2008.

== Professional wins (10) ==
=== Asian Development Tour wins (1) ===
No.	Date	Tournament	Winning score	Margin of victory	Runner-up
1	25 Sep 2011	MIDF KLGCC Classic^{1}	−7 (71-70-67-73=281)	7 strokes	(Philippines) Gerald Rosales

^{1}Co-sanctioned by the Professional Golf of Malaysia Tour

=== Philippine Golf Tour wins (7) ===
No.	Date	Tournament	Winning score	Margin of victory	Runner(s)-up
1	10 Mar 2018	ICTSI Eagle Ridge Challenge	+4 (72-73-71-76=292)	3 strokes	(Philippines) Jay Bayron, (United States) Nicolas Paez
2	8 Jun 2019	ICTSI Club Filipino de Cebu Invitational	−10 (66-65-73-70=274)	2 strokes	(Philippines) Michael Bibat, (Australia) David Gleeson
3	7 Mar 2020	TCC Invitational	+7 (71-74-75-75=295)	1 stroke	(Philippines) Clyde Mondilla
4	27 May 2022	ICTSI Splendido Taal Championship	−16 (68-70-66-68=272)	Playoff	(Philippines) Miguel Tabuena
5	28 Oct 2022	Pradera Verde Championship	−8 (71-70-70-69=280)	1 stroke	(Philippines) Jhonnel Ababa, (Philippines) Antonio Lascuña
6	10 Feb 2023	TCC Invitational (2)	+6 (73-74-74-73=294)	5 strokes	(Philippines) Lloyd Jefferson Go
7	8 Jun 2025	ICTSI Forest Hills Classic	−12 (66-69-67-70=272)	1 stroke	(Philippines) Keanu Jahns, (Philippines) Angelo Que

=== Other wins (2) ===
- 2004 ABN Amro, Dutch PGA Championship

== Playoff record ==
Asian Tour playoff record (0–1)

No.	Year	Tournament	Opponents	Result
1	2011	ISPS Handa Singapore Classic	(Brazil) Adilson da Silva, (India) Himmat Rai, (Philippines) Elmer Salvador, (South Africa) Tjaart van der Walt	Rai won with birdie on sixth extra hole da Silva, van der Valk and van der Walt eliminated by birdie on second hole

== Team appearances ==
Amateur

- European Amateur Team Championship (representing the Netherlands): 1999, 2001
- Eisenhower Trophy (representing the Netherlands): 2000
