= 2011 Philippine Golf Tour =

Golf tour season

2011 Philippine Golf Tour season
- Duration: 27 January 2011 – 25 November 2011
- Number of official events: 15
- Most wins: (Philippines) Juvic Pagunsan (4)
- Order of Merit: (Philippines) Juvic Pagunsan

The 2011 Philippine Golf Tour, titled as the 2011 ICTSI Philippine Golf Tour for sponsorship reasons, was the third season of the Philippine Golf Tour, the main professional golf tour in the Philippines since it was formed in 2009.

== Schedule ==
The following table lists official events during the 2011 season.

Date	Tournament	Location	Purse (₱)	Winner (Note: The number in brackets after each winner's name is the number of Philippine Golf Tour events they had won up to and including that tournament.)	Other tours (Note: ADT − Asian Development Tour.)
30 Jan	TCC Invitational	Laguna	4,700,000	(Philippines) Angelo Que (2)	
1 Apr	ICTSI Royal Northwoods Championship	Luzon	1,000,000	(Philippines) Juvic Pagunsan (5)	
7 Apr	ICTSI Classic	Batangas	1,000,000	(Philippines) Angelo Que (3)	
20 May	ICTSI Orchard Championship	Manila	2,500,000	(Philippines) Juvic Pagunsan (6)	
3 Jun	ICTSI Eastridge Classic	Rizal	1,000,000	(Philippines) Juvic Pagunsan (7)	
15 Jul	ICTSI Negros Occidental Classic	Negros Occidental	1,000,000	(Philippines) Robert Pactolerin (1)	
22 Jul	ICTSI Iloilo Challenge	Iloilo	1,000,000	(Philippines) Jhonnel Ababa (1)	
12 Aug	ICTSI Apo Invitational	Davao	1,000,000	(Philippines) Juvic Pagunsan (8)	
19 Aug	ICTSI Del Monte Championship	Mindanao	1,000,000	(Philippines) Mhark Fernando (2)	
3 Sep	Aboitiz Invitational	Cebu	US$65,000	(Philippines) Jay Bayron (4)	ADT
16 Sep	ICTSI Riviera Classic	Cavite	1,000,000	(Philippines) Jhonnel Ababa (2)	
30 Sep	ICTSI Sherwood Hills Classic	Cavite	1,000,000	(Philippines) Elmer Salvador (4)	
28 Oct	ICTSI Calatagan Challenge	Batangas	1,000,000	(Philippines) Jhonnel Ababa (3)	
11 Nov	BDO Canlubang Invitational	Laguna	1,000,000	(Philippines) Artemio Murakami (1)	
25 Nov	ICTSI Wack Wack Championship	Manila	2,500,000	(Philippines) Frankie Miñoza (2)	

== Order of Merit ==
The Order of Merit was based on prize money won during the season, calculated in Philippine pesos.

Position	Player	Prize money (₱)
1	(Philippines) Juvic Pagunsan	1,474,604
2	(Philippines) Elmer Salvador	1,049,919
3	(Philippines) Jhonnel Ababa	1,014,956
4	(Philippines) Jay Bayron	987,394
5	(Philippines) Antonio Lascuña	932,819
