= Artemio Murakami =

Filipino professional golfer (born 1983)

Personal information
- Nationality: Philippines
- Born: 22 July 1983 (age 43)
- Height: 1.70 m (5 ft 7 in)
- Weight: 95 kg (209 lb; 15.0 st)

Career
- Sport: Golf
- Turned professional: 2005
- Current tour: Asian Tour
- Professional wins: 5

Number of wins by tour
- Asian Tour: 1
- Other: 4

Best results in major championships
- Masters Tournament: DNP
- PGA Championship: DNP
- U.S. Open: CUT: 2008
- The Open Championship: DNP

Artemio Murakami (born 22 July 1983) is a Filipino professional golfer.

== Career ==
Murakami turned professional in 2005 and joined the Asian Tour in 2007. In his debut season he won his first tournament at the Iskandar Johor Open, and in 2008 he recorded his best Order of Merit finish of 47th. However, since then his form has declined, and he lost his tour card at the end of 2010.

Murakami's father is Japanese; as a result he holds dual citizenship.

== Amateur wins ==
- 1999 Philippine Amateur Championship

== Professional wins (5) ==
=== Asian Tour wins (1) ===
No.	Date	Tournament	Winning score	Margin of victory	Runners-up
1	26 Aug 2007	Iskandar Johor Open	−5 (70-72-69-68=279)	1 stroke	(Philippines) Antonio Lascuña, (Scotland) Simon Yates

=== ASEAN PGA Tour wins (1) ===
No.	Date	Tournament	Winning score	Margin of victory	Runners-up
1	17 Apr 2010	Mercedes-Benz Masters Philippines	−13 (73-71-64-67=275)	1 stroke	(Philippines) Jay Bayron, (Philippines) Angelo Que, (Netherlands) Guido van der Valk

=== Philippine Golf Tour wins (1) ===
No.	Date	Tournament	Winning score	Margin of victory	Runners-up
1	11 Nov 2011	BDO Canlubang Invitational	−14 (64-72-66=202)	8 strokes	(Philippines) Jerson Balasabas, (Philippines) Richard Sinfuego

=== Other wins (2) ===
- 2007 Omega Invitational (Philippines)
- 2010 Philippine Open

== Results in major championships ==
Tournament	2008
U.S. Open	CUT

CUT = missed the half-way cut
Note: Murakami only played in the U.S. Open.

== Team appearances ==
Amateur

- Eisenhower Trophy (representing the Philippines): 2004
