= Clyde Mondilla =

Filipino professional golfer (born 1993)

Personal information
- Nationality: Philippines
- Born: 23 November 1993 (age 32)
- Spouse: Mae Mariz Gerong-Mondilla
- Children: 2

Career
- Sport: Golf
- Turned professional: 2012
- Current tour: Philippine Golf Tour
- Professional wins: 16

Achievements and awards
- Philippine Golf Tour Order of Merit winner: 2017

Clyde Mondilla (born 23 November 1993) is a Filipino professional golfer. He has played primarily on the Philippine Golf Tour, highlighted by four tournament wins in 2017, when he topped the Order of Merit. He has also competed on the Asian Development Tour, and in several full Asian Tour events.

Mondilla's first amateur win was at the 2010 Philippine Amateur, making him the youngest player to win the championship at the age of 16.

Mondilla turned professional in 2012 and achieved his first victory in October 2014 by winning the ICTSI Canlubang Golf Invitational on the Philippine Golf Tour (PGT). His next victory was in 2015 when he fired eagle aided 67 to win season-ending PGT Tournament Players Championship at Sherwood Hills Golf Club. In 2016, he won the ICTSI Masters crown at the Eastridge Golf Club in Binangonan, Rizal. He won his second straight title on the PGT posting an eight-stroke victory with a 69 at the ICTSI Calatagan Invitational in Batangas.

On May 21, 2017, he won the ICTSI Manila Southwoods Championship beating Tony Lascuña and Miguel Tabuena. He followed up with victory in the ICTSI Villamor Philippine Masters the following week, and later won the final two events of the season to secure the tour's Order of Merit title.

In 2019, Mondilla won the Philippine Open.

== Amateur wins ==
- 2010 Philippine Amateur

== Professional wins (16) ==
=== Philippine Golf Tour wins (13) ===
No.	Date	Tournament	Winning score	Margin of victory	Runner(s)-up
1	24 Oct 2014	ICTSI Canlubang Invitational	−13 (70-69-67-69=275)	4 strokes	(Philippines) Dante Becierra, (Philippines) Cassius Casas, (Philippines) Marvin Dumandan, (Philippines) Arnold Villacencio
2	26 Sep 2015	ICTSI Tournament Players Championship	−13 (70-69-69-67=275)	1 stroke	(Philippines) Antonio Lascuña
3	7 May 2016	ICTSI Manila Masters	−5 (70-72-71-70=283)	Playoff	(Philippines) Jobim Carlos
4	21 May 2016	ICTSI Calatagan Invitational	−17 (67-64-71-69=271)	8 strokes	(Philippines) Jhonnel Ababa
5	27 Aug 2016	ICTSI Classic	−15 (70-71-65-67=273)	Playoff	(Philippines) Orlan Sumcad
6	20 May 2017	ICTSI Manila Southwoods Championship	−22 (67-67-66-66=266)	1 stroke	(Philippines) Antonio Lascuña, (Philippines) Miguel Tabuena
7	27 May 2017	ICTSI Villamor Philippine Masters	−6 (72-67-73-70=282)	1 stroke	(Philippines) Jhonnel Ababa, (Philippines) Antonio Lascuña, (United States) Nicolas Paez
8	29 Sep 2017	ICTSI Players Championship (2)	−17 (67-68-69-67=271)	3 strokes	(Philippines) Jerson Balasabas
9	19 Oct 2018	ICTSI Luisita Invitational	−18 (64-69-70-67=270)	2 strokes	(Australia) Tim Stewart, (North Macedonia) Peter Stojanovski
10	23 Jun 2023	ICTSI Forest Hills Classic	−18 (60-66-68-72=266)	5 strokes	(Philippines) Angelo Que, (Philippines) Dino Villanueva
11	8 Sep 2023	ICTSI Del Monte Championship	−18 (64-72-65-69=270)	1 stroke	(Philippines) Reymon Jaraula
12	12 Apr 2024	ICTSI Caliraya Springs Championship	−10 (70-71-67-70=278)	3 strokes	(Philippines) Angelo Que
13	23 Oct 2026	ICTSI South Pacific Classic	−18 (67-69-64-70=270)	2 strokes	(Philippines) Sean Ramos

=== PGT Asia wins (3) ===
No.	Date	Tournament	Winning score	Margin of victory	Runner(s)-up
1	16 Sep 2017	ICTSI Riviera Classic	−9 (65-71-72-67=275)	2 strokes	(Philippines) Michael Bibat, (South Korea) Tom Kim (a)
2	6 Apr 2019 (2018 season)	Solaire Philippine Open	+2 (71-75-69-75=290)	2 strokes	(United States) Nicolas Paez
3	24 Jan 2020 (2019 season)	ICTSI Pradera Verde Classic	−4 (69-75-73-67=284)	Playoff	(England) Joe Knox, (Philippines) Antonio Lascuña, (Japan) Toru Nakajima, (Philippines) Rupert Zaragosa
