= 2018 Philippine Golf Tour =

Golf tour season

2018 Philippine Golf Tour season
- Duration: 7 March 2018 – 19 October 2018
- Number of official events: 10
- Most wins: (Philippines) Jobim Carlos (2)
- Order of Merit: (Philippines) Jobim Carlos

The 2018 Philippine Golf Tour, titled as the 2018 ICTSI Philippine Golf Tour for sponsorship reasons, was the 10th season of the Philippine Golf Tour, the main professional golf tour in the Philippines since it was formed in 2009.

== Schedule ==
The following table lists official events during the 2018 season.

Date	Tournament	Location	Purse (₱)	Winner (Note: The number in brackets after each winner's name is the number of Philippine Golf Tour events they had won up to and including that tournament.)
10 Mar	ICTSI Eagle Ridge Challenge	Cavite	2,500,000	(Netherlands) Guido van der Valk (1)
26 May	ICTSI Villamor Philippine Masters	Manila	3,000,000	(Philippines) Jerson Balasabas (1)
23 Jun	ICTSI Apo Invitational	Davao	3,000,000	(Philippines) Jobim Carlos (1)
30 Jun	ICTSI Del Monte Championship	Mindanao	3,000,000	(United States) Nicolas Paez (1)
7 Jul	ICTSI Pueblo de Oro Championship	Mindanao	3,000,000	(South Korea) Tom Kim (1)
11 Aug	ICTSI Bacolod Challenge	Negros Occidental	2,500,000	(Philippines) Justin Quiban (1)
18 Aug	ICTSI Negros Occidental Classic	Negros Occidental	3,500,000	(Philippines) Juvic Pagunsan (11)
25 Aug	ICTSI Iloilo Challenge	Iloilo	3,000,000	(Philippines) Jobim Carlos (2)
1 Sep	ICTSI Club Filipino De Cebu Invitational	Cebu	3,500,000	(Philippines) Jhonnel Ababa (4)
19 Oct	ICTSI Luisita Invitational	Tarlac	4,000,000	(Philippines) Clyde Mondilla (9)

== Order of Merit ==
The Order of Merit was based on prize money won during the season, calculated in Philippine pesos.

Position	Player	Prize money (₱)
1	(Philippines) Jobim Carlos	2,487,083
2	(Philippines) Jhonnel Ababa	1,366,375
3	(South Korea) Tom Kim	1,361,500
4	(Netherlands) Guido van der Valk	1,268,643
5	(Philippines) Clyde Mondilla	1,134,234

== PGT Asia ==
2018 PGT Asia season
- Duration: 17 April 2018 – 6 April 2019
- Number of official events: 10
- Most wins: (Philippines) Jhonnel Ababa (2)
- Order of Merit: (Philippines) Clyde Mondilla

The 2018 PGT Asia was the second season of the PGT Asia.

=== Schedule ===
The following table lists official events during the 2018 season.

Date	Tournament	Location	Purse (US$)	Winner (Note: The number in brackets after each winner's name is the number of PGT Asia events they had won up to and including that tournament.)
20 Apr	ICTSI Luisita Championship	Tarlac	100,000	(Australia) David Gleeson (1)
2 Jun	ICTSI Riviera Classic	Cavite	100,000	(Philippines) Jobim Carlos (1)
8 Jun	ICTSI Manila Southwoods Championship	Manila	100,000	(Philippines) Jay Bayron (1)
14 Jul	ICTSI Forest Hills Championship	Rizal	100,000	(Philippines) Jhonnel Ababa (3)
8 Sep	Aboitiz Invitational	Manila	100,000	(Australia) Damien Jordan (1)
26 Oct	CAT Open	Tarlac	100,000	(Philippines) James Ryan Lam (1)
3 Nov	Summit Point World 18 Challenge	Batangas	100,000	(Philippines) Joenard Rates (1)
19 Jan	ICTSI Pradera Verde Classic	Pampanga	100,000	(Philippines) Jhonnel Ababa (4)
30 Mar	ICTSI Riviera Challenge	Cavite	100,000	(Philippines) Juvic Pagunsan (1)
6 Apr	Solaire Philippine Open	Laguna	500,000	(Philippines) Clyde Mondilla (2)

=== Order of Merit ===
The Order of Merit was based on prize money won during the season, calculated in U.S. dollars.

Position	Player	Prize money ($)
1	(Philippines) Clyde Mondilla	102,790
2	(United States) Nicolas Paez	59,390
3	(Philippines) Jhonnel Ababa	50,853
4	(Philippines) Angelo Que	47,229
5	(Philippines) Jobim Carlos	41,602
