= Golf at the 2026 Asian Games – Men's individual =

Golf – Men's individual at the 2026 Asian Games
- Venue: Kasugai Country Club
- Date: 30 September 2026 – 3 October 2026
- Competitors: 66 from 25 nations

Medalists
gold medal	Kim Joo-hyung	South Korea
silver medal	Kazuki Higa	Japan
bronze medal	Sadom Kaewkanjana	Thailand

The men's individual competition at the 2026 Asian Games in Nagoya and Aichi, Japan was held from 30 September to 3 October 2026 at the Kasugai Country Club.

== Schedule ==
All times are Japan Standard Time (UTC+09:00)

Date	Time	Event
Wednesday, 30 September 2026	06:30	Round 1
Thursday, 1 October 2026	10:40	Round 2
Friday, 2 October 2026	06:30	Round 3
Saturday, 3 October 2026	08:15	Round 4

== Results ==
Rank	Athlete	Round				Total	To par
Rank	Athlete	1	2	3	4	Total	To par
1st place, gold medalist(s)	Kim Joo-hyung (KOR)	67	66	65	64	262	−18
T2	Kazuki Higa (JPN)	65	67	67	66	265	−15
T2	Sadom Kaewkanjana (THA)	70	69	63	63	265	−15
T2	Ding Wenyi (CHN)	67	64	70	64	265	−15
5	Wang Wei-hsuan (TPE)	65	66	68	70	269	−11
T6	Veer Ahlawat (IND)	71	68	65	67	271	−9
T6	Saptak Talwar (IND)	66	68	71	66	271	−9
T8	Chan Shih-chang (TPE)	71	67	65	69	272	−8
T8	Mun Do-yeob (KOR)	66	67	69	70	272	−8
T8	Jin Zihao (CHN)	70	68	68	66	272	−8
T11	Hiroshi Tai (SGP)	70	70	69	64	273	−7
T11	Keita Nakajima (JPN)	66	66	70	71	273	−7
13	Matthew Cheung (HKG)	68	70	70	66	274	−6
14	Zheng Yunhe (CHN)	66	68	69	73	276	−4
T15	Jonathan Wijono (INA)	68	68	72	69	277	−3
T15	Justin de los Santos (PHI)	68	67	71	71	277	−3
T17	Nguyễn Anh Minh (VIE)	71	71	67	69	278	−2
T17	Hung Chien-yao (TPE)	72	69	70	67	278	−2
T19	James Leow (SGP)	72	73	67	67	279	−1
T19	Hak Shunyat (HKG)	73	68	73	65	279	−1
T19	Pongsapak Laopakdee (THA)	72	67	73	67	279	−1
T19	Kho Taichi (HKG)	69	70	69	71	279	−1
23	Subash Tamang (NEP)	70	67	71	72	280	E
T24	Yuvraj Sandhu (IND)	71	69	71	70	281	+1
T24	Kim Seong-hyeon (KOR)	68	71	69	73	281	+1
T24	Poom Saksansin (THA)	74	69	67	71	281	+1
T27	Naraajie Ramadhan Putra (INA)	71	69	70	72	282	+2
T27	Siddikur Rahman (BAN)	69	71	73	69	282	+2
T27	Miguel Tabuena (PHI)	70	70	71	71	282	+2
30	Si Ngai (MAC)	69	69	74	71	283	+3
T31	Taishi Moto (JPN)	74	68	72	70	284	+4
T31	Carl Jano Corpus (PHI)	69	72	77	66	284	+4
T33	Daniil Sokolov (QAT)	72	73	69	71	285	+5
T33	Badal Hossain (BAN)	71	68	76	70	285	+5
T35	Jamal Hossain (BAN)	75	69	74	75	293	+13
T35	Nguyễn Tuấn Anh (VIE)	69	74	75	75	293	+13
T37	Sam Mullane (UAE)	76	69	82	70	297	+17
T37	Mithun Chamika (SRI)	74	70	80	73	297	+17
CUT	Kanatbek Kurbanaliev (UZB)	76	71			147	+7
CUT	Lê Khánh Hưng (VIE)	77	70			147	+7
CUT	Lei Kun Wang (MAC)	75	73			148	+8
CUT	Thangaraja Nadaraja (SRI)	73	75			148	+8
CUT	Randy Arbenata Bintang (INA)	73	76			149	+9
CUT	Nicklaus Chiam (SGP)	75	75			150	+10
CUT	Saleh Ali Alkaabi (QAT)	76	76			152	+12
CUT	Rahul Bishwakarma (NEP)	76	76			152	+12
CUT	Akbarjon Inoyatov (UZB)	76	77			153	+13
CUT	Jonathan Selvaraj (UAE)	76	78			154	+14
CUT	Dhanushan Kanas Kumar (SRI)	80	75			155	+15
CUT	Hun Pui In (MAC)	77	79			156	+16
CUT	Sergey Chen (UZB)	73	84			157	+17
CUT	Ali Al-Shahrani (QAT)	76	82			158	+18
CUT	Joseph Easmeil (PLE)	84	76			160	+20
CUT	Salem Al-Abkal (KUW)	81	79			160	+20
CUT	Syed Rayan Ahmed (UAE)	79	82			161	+21
CUT	Akhmetzhan Tagashev (KAZ)	87	75			162	+22
CUT	Ahmed Al Wahaibi (OMA)	80	85			165	+25
CUT	Sajjad Karampour (IRI)	93	72			165	+25
CUT	Marat Bagtzhanov (KAZ)	85	81			166	+26
CUT	Solongobat Otgonbaatar (MGL)	81	88			169	+29
CUT	Iman Uvalkanov (KGZ)	89	83			172	+32
CUT	Amro Alhouseini (PLE)	85	89			174	+34
CUT	Heneri Ismail (PLE)	95	79			174	+34
CUT	Anarbat Jargalsaikhan (MGL)	96	88			184	+44
CUT	Javkhlan Boldbaatar (MGL)	93	93			186	+46
WD	Sadbhav Acharya (NEP)						

=== Playoff ===
Silver/Bronze medal playoff
Rank	Athlete	Hole				
Rank	Athlete	18	18	18	18	18
2nd place, silver medalist(s)	Kazuki Higa (JPN)	4	4	4	3	–
3rd place, bronze medalist(s)	Sadom Kaewkanjana (THA)	4	4	4	4	3
4	Ding Wenyi (CHN)	4	4	4	4	4
