= 2010 Philippine Golf Tour =

Golf tour season

2010 Philippine Golf Tour season
- Duration: 28 January 2010 – 26 November 2010
- Number of official events: 12
- Most wins: (Philippines) Marvin Dumandan (3)
- Order of Merit: (Philippines) Jay Bayron

The 2010 Philippine Golf Tour, titled as the 2010 ICTSI Philippine Golf Tour for sponsorship reasons, was the second season of the Philippine Golf Tour, the main professional golf tour in the Philippines since it was formed in 2009.

== Schedule ==
The following table lists official events during the 2010 season.

Date	Tournament	Location	Purse (₱)	Winner (Note: The number in brackets after each winner's name is the number of Philippine Golf Tour events they had won up to and including that tournament.)
31 Jan	TCC Invitational	Laguna	4,700,000	(Philippines) Angelo Que (1)
18 Feb	ICTSI Classic	Batangas	1,000,000	(Philippines) Elmer Salvador (3)
19 Mar	ICTSI Sherwood Hills Classic	Cavite	1,000,000	(Philippines) Marvin Dumandan (2)
21 May	ICTSI Riviera Classic	Cavite	1,000,000	(Philippines) Juvic Pagunsan (3)
28 May	ICTSI Forest Hills Championship	Manila	1,000,000	(Philippines) Mars Pucay (1)
2 Jul	ICTSI Orchard Championship	Manila	1,000,000	(Philippines) Benjie Magada (1)
16 Jul	ICTSI Apo Invitational	Davao	1,000,000	(Philippines) Juvic Pagunsan (4)
23 Jul	ICTSI Del Monte Championship	Mindanao	1,000,000	(Philippines) Cassius Casas (1)
13 Aug	Aboitiz Cebu Country Club Invitational	Cebu	1,000,000	(Philippines) Jay Bayron (2)
8 Oct	ICTSI Royal Northwoods Championship	Luzon	1,000,000	(Philippines) Marvin Dumandan (3)
12 Nov	ICTSI Mimosa Challenge	Pampanga	1,000,000	(Philippines) Marvin Dumandan (4)
26 Nov	ICTSI Canlubang Invitational	Laguna	1,000,000	(Philippines) Jay Bayron (3)

== Order of Merit ==
The Order of Merit was based on prize money won during the season, calculated in Philippine pesos.

Position	Player	Prize money (₱)
1	(Philippines) Jay Bayron	1,030,817
2	(Philippines) Juvic Pagunsan	945,833
3	(Philippines) Artemio Murakami	787,810
4	(Philippines) Marvin Dumandan	771,973
5	(Philippines) Mars Pucay	668,017
