= Juvic Pagunsan =

Filipino professional golfer (born 1978)

Personal information
- Nationality: Philippines
- Born: 11 May 1978 (age 48) Manila, Philippines
- Height: 168 cm (5 ft 6 in)
- Weight: 62 kg (137 lb)

Career
- Sport: Golf
- Turned professional: 2006
- Current tours: Japan Golf Tour; Asian Development Tour
- Former tours: Asian Tour; ASEAN PGA Tour; Philippine Golf Tour
- Professional wins: 25

Number of wins by tour
- Japan Golf Tour: 2
- Asian Tour: 1
- Other: 22

Best results in major championships
- Masters Tournament: DNP
- PGA Championship: DNP
- U.S. Open: DNP
- The Open Championship: T72: 2012

Achievements and awards
- Asian Tour Rookie of the Year: 2006
- ASEAN PGA Tour Order of Merit winner: 2010
- Philippine Golf Tour Order of Merit winner: 2011, 2019
- Asian Tour Order of Merit winner: 2011
- Asian Tour Players' Player of the Year: 2011
Medal record
Men's golf
Representing Thailand
SEA Games
Gold medal – first place	2001 Kuala Lumpur	Individual
Gold medal – first place	2005 Manila	Individual
Gold medal – first place	2005 Manila	Team
Bronze medal – third place	2001 Kuala Lumpur	Team

Juvic Pagunsan (born 11 May 1978) is a Filipino professional golfer who plays on the Japan Golf Tour and the Asian Tour. He won the 2007 Pertamina Indonesia President Invitational on the Asian Tour and the 2021 Gateway to The Open Mizuno Open on the Japan Golf Tour.

== Amateur career ==
Pagunsan had an amateur career with numerous victories that included the 2005 Philippine, Thailand and Malaysian Amateurs.

Pagunsan nearly won the 2004 Philippine Open as an amateur. He was a co-leader going into the final round, but settled for second place, three strokes behind the winner.

== Professional career ==
Pagunsan turned professional in 2006 at the age of 27 and immediately qualified for the Asian Tour. He had 4 top-10s in his rookie season, and he made over $290,000 in earnings. This remains his most successful season on Tour financially. He had two wins on smaller venues in Asia in 2006 and 2007.

In 2007, Pagunsan won his first title on the Asian Tour at the Pertamina Indonesia President Invitational, where he finished birdie-eagle to defeat India's Gaganjeet Bhullar by a slim margin. He did not win an event in 2008, but had three top-10s including a second-place finish to Mo Joong-kyung at the Singha Thailand PGA Championship. In 2011, Pagunsan won the Asian Tour Order of Merit.

Since 2012 Pagunsan has played primarily on the Japan Golf Tour. His first win on the tour came at the 2021 Gateway to The Open Mizuno Open, having previously had a number of runner-up finishes, including the 2012 Japan Open Golf Championship, the 2013 and 2014 Indonesia PGA Championship, the 2014 Gateway to the Open Mizuno Open, the 2017 SMBC Singapore Open, the 2019 Shigeo Nagashima Invitational Sega Sammy Cup and the 2021 Asia-Pacific Diamond Cup Golf.

Pagunsan qualified for the 2020 Tokyo Olympics by making it to the Top 60 of the International Golf Federation Rankings.

== Amateur highlights ==
- 2001 Kuala Lumpur SEA Games
- 2005 Manila SEA Games individual and team, Philippine Amateur, Thailand Amateur, Malaysian Amateur Open

== Professional wins (25) ==
=== Japan Golf Tour wins (2) ===
No.	Date	Tournament	Winning score	Margin of victory	Runner(s)-up
1	30 May 2021	Gateway to The Open Mizuno Open	−17 (66-65-68=199) (Note: Shortened to 54 holes due to weather.)	3 strokes	(Japan) Ryutaro Nagano
2	21 May 2023	Golf Partner Pro-Am Tournament	−23 (64-63-64-66=257)	2 strokes	(Japan) Taihei Sato, (Japan) Taiga Semikawa

=== Asian Tour wins (1) ===
No.	Date	Tournament	Winning score	Margin of victory	Runner-up
1	28 Oct 2007	Pertamina Indonesia President Invitational	−19 (66-67-71-65=269)	1 stroke	(India) Gaganjeet Bhullar

Asian Tour playoff record (0–1)

No.	Year	Tournament	Opponent	Result
1	2011	Barclays Singapore Open	(Spain) Gonzalo Fernández-Castaño	Lost to birdie on second extra hole

=== Asian Development Tour wins (2) ===
No.	Date	Tournament	Winning score	Margin of victory	Runner(s)-up
1	6 Nov 2010	Bali Open	−15 (72-67-68-66=273)	11 strokes	(Sweden) Jarmo Sandelin
2	8 Aug 2015	Aboitiz Invitational^{1}	−20 (69-62-68-65=264)	8 strokes	(Thailand) Nirun Sae-ueng, (Philippines) Angelo Que, (Thailand) Pijit Petchkasem

^{1}Co-sanctioned by the Philippine Golf Tour

=== ASEAN PGA Tour wins (1) ===
No.	Date	Tournament	Winning score	Margin of victory	Runner-up
1	5 Jun 2010	Mercedes-Benz Masters Thailand	−19 (66-65-65-65=261)	7 strokes	(Thailand) Udorn Duangdecha

=== Philippine Golf Tour wins (16) ===
No.	Date	Tournament	Winning score	Margin of victory	Runner(s)-up
1	3 Jul 2009	Apo Classic	−10 (66-69-71=206)	6 strokes	(Philippines) Jerome Delariarte, (Philippines) Artemio Murakami
2	9 Dec 2009	ICTSI Canlubang Invitational	−9 (68-68-71=207)	3 strokes	(Philippines) Angelo Que, (Philippines) Elmer Salvador
3	21 May 2010	ICTSI Riviera Classic	−8 (70-69-69=208)	6 strokes	(Philippines) Richard Sinfuego, (Philippines) Danny Zarate
4	16 Jul 2010	ICTSI Apo Invitational (2)	−8 (69-69-70=208)	4 strokes	(Philippines) Ferdie Aunzo, (Philippines) Elmer Saban
5	1 Apr 2011	ICTSI Royal Northwoods Championship	−11 (66-70-69=205)	1 stroke	(Philippines) Jay Bayron
6	20 May 2011	ICTSI Orchard Championship	−15 (69-69-63=201)	5 strokes	(Philippines) Elmer Salvador
7	3 Jun 2011	ICTSI Eastridge Classic	−9 (71-66-67=204)	1 stroke	(Philippines) Marvin Dumandan, (Philippines) Artemio Murakami
8	12 Aug 2011	ICTSI Apo Invitational (3)	−14 (66-66-70=202)	4 strokes	(Philippines) Elmer Salvador
9	29 Jan 2012	TCC Invitational	−3 (70-69-69-69=277)	4 strokes	(Philippines) Elmer Salvador
10	8 Aug 2015	Aboitiz Invitational^{1}	−20 (69-62-68-65=264)	8 strokes	(Thailand) Nirun Sae-ueng, (Philippines) Angelo Que, (Thailand) Pijit Petchkasem
11	18 Aug 2018	ICTSI Negros Occidental Classic	−9 (69-70-65-67=271)	Playoff	(Philippines) Jobim Carlos
12	15 Jun 2019	ICTSI Bacolod Challenge	−20 (68-65-63-64=260)	7 strokes	(Philippines) Rufino Bayron
13	22 Jun 2019	ICTSI Negros Occidental Classic (2)	−11 (66-66-68-69=269)	4 strokes	(Philippines) James Ryan Lam
14	29 Jun 2019	ICTSI Iloilo Challenge	−8 (69-68-68-67=272)	Playoff	(Philippines) Michael Bibat
15	10 Aug 2019	ICTSI Riviera Classic (2)	−7 (68-72-67-70=277)	8 strokes	(Philippines) Antonio Lascuña
16	7 Oct 2022	ICTSI Rivieria Championship (3)	+5 (75-71-72-71=289)	Playoff	(Philippines) Antonio Lascuña

^{1}Co-sanctioned by the Asian Development Tour

=== PGT Asia wins (2) ===
No.	Date	Tournament	Winning score	Margin of victory	Runner-up
1	30 Mar 2019 (2018 season)	ICTSI Riviera Challenge	−6 (71-71-66-70=278)	7 strokes	(Philippines) Angelo Que
2	26 Oct 2019	ICTSI Summit Point World 18 Challenge	−18 (71-64-64-71=270)	Playoff	(Philippines) Antonio Lascuña

=== Other wins (2) ===
- 2006 The Country Club Invitational (Philippines)
- 2007 Negeri Masters (Malaysia)

== Results in major championships ==
Tournament	2012	2013	2014
Masters Tournament			
U.S. Open			
The Open Championship	T72		CUT
PGA Championship			

Did not play

CUT = missed the half-way cut
"T" = tied

== Results in World Golf Championships ==
Tournament	2012
Match Play	
Championship	T35
Invitational	
Champions	

Did not play

"T" = Tied

== Team appearances ==
Amateur

- Eisenhower Trophy (representing the Philippines): 2000, 2002, 2004
- Bonallack Trophy (representing Asia/Pacific): 2004 (winners)
