= 2017 Philippine Golf Tour =

Golf tour season

2017 Philippine Golf Tour season
- Duration: 2 February 2017 – 29 September 2017
- Number of official events: 12
- Most wins: (Philippines) Clyde Mondilla (3)
- Order of Merit: (Philippines) Clyde Mondilla

The 2017 Philippine Golf Tour, titled as the 2017 ICTSI Philippine Golf Tour for sponsorship reasons, was the ninth season of the Philippine Golf Tour, the main professional golf tour in the Philippines since it was formed in 2009.

== Schedule ==
The following table lists official events during the 2017 season.

Date	Tournament	Location	Purse (₱)	Winner (Note: The number in brackets after each winner's name is the number of Philippine Golf Tour events they had won up to and including that tournament.)
5 Feb	TCC Invitational	Laguna	5,000,000	(Philippines) Miguel Tabuena (10)
18 Feb	ICTSI Anvaya Cove Invitational	Bataan	3,500,000	(Philippines) Angelo Que (7)
5 Mar	Solaire Philippine Open	Laguna	US$400,000	(England) Steve Lewton (n/a)
8 Apr	ICTSI Manila Masters	Manila	3,000,000	(Philippines) Antonio Lascuña (18)
6 May	ICTSI Luisita Championship	Tarlac	US$60,000	(Philippines) Miguel Tabuena (11)
13 May	ICTSI Orchard Championship	Manila	US$60,000	(Thailand) Gunn Charoenkul (1)
20 May	ICTSI Manila Southwoods Championship	Manila	US$60,000	(Philippines) Clyde Mondilla (6)
27 May	ICTSI Villamor Philippine Masters	Manila	2,000,000	(Philippines) Clyde Mondilla (7)
10 Jun	ICTSI Calatagan Challenge	Batangas	2,500,000	(Philippines) Zanieboy Gialon (4)
24 Jun	ICTSI Forest Hills Championship	Rizal	3,000,000	(Philippines) Antonio Lascuña (19)
22 Jul	ICTSI Mount Malarayat Classic	Batangas	2,000,000	(Philippines) Angelo Que (8)
29 Sep	ICTSI Players Championship	Manila	3,000,000	(Philippines) Clyde Mondilla (8)

== Order of Merit ==
The Order of Merit was based on prize money won during the season, calculated in Philippine pesos.

Position	Player	Prize money (₱)
1	(Philippines) Clyde Mondilla	3,156,409
2	(Philippines) Antonio Lascuña	2,566,543
3	(Philippines) Miguel Tabuena	1,909,705
4	(Philippines) Jhonnel Ababa	1,639,845
5	(Philippines) Angelo Que	1,600,525

== PGT Asia ==
2017 PGT Asia season
- Duration: 15 August 2017 – 3 March 2018
- Number of official events: 8
- Most wins: (Philippines) Jhonnel Ababa (2)
- Order of Merit: (Philippines) Miguel Tabuena

The 2017 PGT Asia was the inaugural season of the PGT Asia.

=== Schedule ===
The following table lists official events during the 2017 season.

Date	Tournament	Location	Purse (US$)	Winner (Note: The number in brackets after each winner's name is the number of PGT Asia events they had won up to and including that tournament.)	Other tours (Note: ONE − OneAsia Tour.)
18 Aug	Aboitiz Invitational	Cebu	100,000	(Philippines) Miguel Tabuena (1)	
9 Sep	ICTSI Splendido Classic	Batangas	100,000	(Philippines) Rene Menor (1)	
16 Sep	ICTSI Riviera Classic	Cavite	100,000	(Philippines) Clyde Mondilla (1)	
18 Nov	ICTSI Wack Wack Championship	Manila	100,000	(Philippines) Antonio Lascuña (1)	
2 Dec	CAT Open	Tarlac	100,000	(Philippines) Justin Quiban (1)	
20 Jan	ICTSI Eagle Ridge Invitational	Cavite	100,000	(Philippines) Jhonnel Ababa (1)	
27 Jan	ICTSI Pradera Verde Classic	Pampanga	100,000	(Philippines) Jhonnel Ababa (2)	
3 Mar	Solaire Philippine Open	Laguna	600,000	(Philippines) Miguel Tabuena (2)	ONE

=== Order of Merit ===
The Order of Merit was based on prize money won during the season, calculated in U.S. dollars.

Position	Player	Prize money ($)
1	(Philippines) Miguel Tabuena	125,500
2	(Philippines) Jhonnel Ababa	59,252
3	(Netherlands) Guido van der Valk	47,746
4	(Philippines) Antonio Lascuña	47,484
5	(Philippines) Joenard Rates	38,070
