= 2009 Philippine Golf Tour =

Golf tour season

2009 Philippine Golf Tour season
- Duration: 25 February 2009 – 9 December 2009
- Number of official events: 10
- Most wins: (Philippines) Juvic Pagunsan (2) (Philippines) Elmer Salvador (2)
- Order of Merit: (Philippines) Elmer Salvador

The 2009 Philippine Golf Tour, titled as the 2009 ICTSI Philippine Golf Tour for sponsorship reasons, was the inaugural season of the Philippine Golf Tour, the main professional golf tour in the Philippines since it was formed in 2009.

== Schedule ==
The following table lists official events during the 2009 season.

Date	Tournament	Location	Purse (₱)	Winner (Note: The number in brackets after each winner's name is the number of Philippine Golf Tour events they had won up to and including that tournament.)
27 Feb	ICTSI Mount Malarayat Classic	Batangas	1,000,000	(Philippines) Danny Zarate (1)
24 Apr	ICTSI Eagle Ridge Invitational	Cavite	1,000,000	(Philippines) Marvin Dumandan (1)
3 Jul	Apo Classic	Davao	1,000,000	(Philippines) Juvic Pagunsan (1)
10 Jul	ICTSI Pueblo de Oro Championship	Mindanao	1,000,000	(Philippines) Frankie Miñoza (1)
31 Jul	Sherwood Classic	Cavite	1,000,000	(Philippines) Elmer Salvador (1)
12 Sep	ICTSI Riviera Championship	Cavite	1,000,000	(Philippines) Mhark Fernando (a) (1)
3 Oct	ICTSI Royal Northwoods Invitational	Luzon	1,000,000	(Philippines) Ferdie Aunzo (1)
31 Oct	ICTSI Forest Hills Championship	Manila	1,000,000	(Philippines) Jay Bayron (1)
19 Nov	ICTSI Valley Challenge	Rizal	1,000,000	(Philippines) Elmer Salvador (2)
9 Dec	ICTSI Canlubang Invitational	Laguna	1,000,000	(Philippines) Juvic Pagunsan (2)

== Order of Merit ==
The Order of Merit was based on prize money won during the season, calculated in Philippine pesos.

Position	Player	Prize money (₱)
1	(Philippines) Elmer Salvador	784,562
2	(Philippines) Richard Sinfuego	590,547
3	(Philippines) Marvin Dumandan	581,867
4	(Philippines) Ferdie Aunzo	567,293
5	(Philippines) Danny Zarate	526,227
