= 2021 Philippine Golf Tour =

Golf tour season

2021 Philippine Golf Tour season
- Duration: 9 March 2021 – 12 March 2021
- Number of official events: 1 (Note: One further tournament was scheduled but was cancelled.)

The 2021 Philippine Golf Tour, titled as the 2021 ICTSI Philippine Golf Tour for sponsorship reasons, was the 13th season of the Philippine Golf Tour, the main professional golf tour in the Philippines since it was formed in 2009.

== Schedule ==
The following table lists official events during the 2021 season.

| Date | Tournament | Location | Purse (₱) | Winner (Note: The number in brackets after each winner's name is the number of Philippine Golf Tour events they had won up to and including that tournament.) |
|---|---|---|---|---|
| 12 Mar | ICTSI Eagle Ridge Challenge | Cavite | 2,000,000 | (Philippines) Miguel Tabuena (12) |
| ~~26 Mar~~ | ICTSI Eagle Ridge Championship | Cavite | – | Cancelled |
