= 2013 Philippine Golf Tour =

Golf tour season

2013 Philippine Golf Tour season
- Duration: 7 February 2013 – 23 November 2013
- Number of official events: 16
- Most wins: (Philippines) Frankie Miñoza (3)
- Order of Merit: (Philippines) Antonio Lascuña

The 2013 Philippine Golf Tour, titled as the 2013 ICTSI Philippine Golf Tour for sponsorship reasons, was the fifth season of the Philippine Golf Tour, the main professional golf tour in the Philippines since it was formed in 2009.

== Schedule ==
The following table lists official events during the 2013 season.

Date	Tournament	Location	Purse (₱)	Winner (Note: The number in brackets after each winner's name is the number of Philippine Golf Tour events they had won up to and including that tournament.)	OWGR points	Other tours (Note: ADT − Asian Development Tour.)
10 Feb	TCC Invitational	Laguna	5,000,000	(Philippines) Frankie Miñoza (3)	n/a	
23 Mar	ICTSI Sherwood Hills Classic	Cavite	2,500,000	(Philippines) Miguel Tabuena (3)	n/a	
27 Apr	ICTSI Camp John Hay Championship	Batangas	2,500,000	(Philippines) Jay Bayron (5)	n/a	
10 May	ICTSI Calatagan Challenge	Batangas	1,000,000	(Philippines) Antonio Lascuña (4)	n/a	
25 May	ICTSI Orchard Championship	Manila	2,500,000	(Philippines) Angelo Que (4)	n/a	
28 Jun	ICTSI Rancho Palos Verdes Classic	Davao	1,000,000	(Philippines) Michael Bibat (1)	n/a	
5 Jul	ICTSI Del Monte Championship	Mindanao	1,000,000	(Philippines) Frankie Miñoza (4)	n/a	
12 Jul	ICTSI Pueblo de Oro Championship	Mindanao	1,000,000	(Philippines) Frankie Miñoza (5)	n/a	
27 Jul	Aboitiz Invitational	Cebu	US$65,000	(Philippines) Elmer Salvador (7)	6	ADT
3 Aug	ICTSI Mount Malarayat Classic	Batangas	US$60,000	(Thailand) Sattaya Supupramai (n/a)	6	ADT
16 Aug	ICTSI Tagaytay Midlands Challenge	Mindanao	1,000,000	(Philippines) Carl Santos-Ocampo (2)	n/a	
7 Sep	ICTSI Manila Southwoods Championship	Manila	2,500,000	(Philippines) Antonio Lascuña (5)	n/a	
11 Oct	ICTSI Splendido Classic	Batangas	1,000,000	(Philippines) Elmer Saban (1)	n/a	
19 Oct	ICTSI Riviera Classic	Cavite	2,500,000	(Philippines) Mhark Fernando (4)	n/a	
8 Nov	ICTSI Canlubang Invitational	Laguna	1,000,000	(Philippines) Cassius Casas (2)	n/a	
23 Nov	ICTSI Wack Wack Championship	Manila	2,500,000	(Japan) Toru Nakajima (1)	n/a	

== Order of Merit ==
The Order of Merit was based on prize money won during the season, calculated in Philippine pesos.

Position	Player	Prize money (₱)
1	(Philippines) Antonio Lascuña	1,682,332
2	(Philippines) Miguel Tabuena	1,506,313
3	(Philippines) Elmer Salvador	1,152,777
4	(Philippines) Jay Bayron	1,117,371
5	(Philippines) Angelo Que	1,036,276
