= 2015 Philippine Golf Tour =

Golf tour season

2015 Philippine Golf Tour season
- Duration: 18 March 2015 – 26 September 2015
- Number of official events: 15
- Most wins: (Philippines) Miguel Tabuena (4)
- Order of Merit: (Philippines) Miguel Tabuena

The 2015 Philippine Golf Tour, titled as the 2015 ICTSI Philippine Golf Tour for sponsorship reasons, was the seventh season of the Philippine Golf Tour, the main professional golf tour in the Philippines since it was formed in 2009.

== Schedule ==
The following table lists official events during the 2015 season.

Date	Tournament	Location	Purse (₱)	Winner (Note: The number in brackets after each winner's name is the number of Philippine Golf Tour events they had won up to and including that tournament.)	OWGR points	Other tours (Note: ADT − Asian Development Tour.)
21 Mar	ICTSI Splendido Classic	Batangas	2,000,000	(Philippines) Miguel Tabuena (5)	n/a	
28 Mar	ICTSI Manila Masters	Manila	3,500,000	(Philippines) Angelo Que (5)	n/a	
18 Apr	ICTSI Eagle Ridge Invitational	Cavite	US$60,000	(Malaysia) Arie Irawan (n/a)	7	ADT
25 Apr	ICTSI Sherwood Hills Classic	Cavite	US$60,000	(Thailand) Itthipat Buranatanyarat (n/a)	6	ADT
16 May	ICTSI Anvaya Cove Invitational	Bataan	3,500,000	(Philippines) Angelo Que (6)	n/a	
23 May	ICTSI Luisita Championship	Tarlac	2,000,000	(Philippines) Charles Hong (3)	n/a	
27 Jun	ICTSI Riviera Classic	Cavite	1,500,000	(Philippines) Elmer Salvador (9)	n/a	
4 Jul	ICTSI Rancho Palos Verdes Classic	Davao	1,500,000	(Philippines) Miguel Tabuena (6)	n/a	
11 Jul	ICTSI Apo Invitational	Davao	1,500,000	(Philippines) Antonio Lascuña (11)	n/a	
1 Aug	ICTSI Classic	Batangas	1,500,000	(Philippines) Antonio Lascuña (12)	n/a	
8 Aug	Aboitiz Invitational	Cebu	US$100,000	(Philippines) Juvic Pagunsan (10)	6	ADT
28 Aug	ICTSI Summit Point Classic	Manila	1,500,000	(Philippines) Jay Bayron (7)	n/a	
12 Sep	ICTSI Open Championship	Manila	3,500,000	(Philippines) Miguel Tabuena (7)	n/a	
19 Sep	Central Azucarera de Tarlac Open	Tarlac	2,500,000	(Philippines) Miguel Tabuena (8)	n/a	
26 Sep	ICTSI Tournament Players Championship	Cavite	3,500,000	(Philippines) Clyde Mondilla (2)	n/a	

== Order of Merit ==
The Order of Merit was based on prize money won during the season, calculated in Philippine pesos.

Position	Player	Prize money (₱)
1	(Philippines) Miguel Tabuena	3,051,918
2	(Philippines) Antonio Lascuña	2,815,961
3	(Philippines) Angelo Que	2,272,131
4	(Philippines) Clyde Mondilla	1,646,276
5	(Philippines) Elmer Salvador	1,530,396
