= 2022 Philippine Golf Tour =

Golf tour season

2022 Philippine Golf Tour season
- Duration: 22 March 2022 – 18 November 2022
- Number of official events: 7
- Most wins: (Netherlands) Guido van der Valk (2)

The 2022 Philippine Golf Tour, titled as the 2022 ICTSI Philippine Golf Tour for sponsorship reasons, was the 14th season of the Philippine Golf Tour, the main professional golf tour in the Philippines since it was formed in 2009.

== Schedule ==
The following table lists official events during the 2022 season.

Date	Tournament	Location	Purse (₱)	Winner (Note: The number in brackets after each winner's name is the number of Philippine Golf Tour events they had won up to and including that tournament.)
25 Mar	ICTSI Luisita Championship	Tarlac	2,000,000	(Philippines) Miguel Tabuena (13)
22 Apr	ICTSI Caliraya Springs Championship	Laguna	2,000,000	(Philippines) Zanieboy Gialon (5)
27 May	ICTSI Splendido Taal Championship	Batangas	2,000,000	(Netherlands) Guido van der Valk (4)
8 Jul	ICTSI Eagle Ridge Aoki Invitational	Cavite	2,000,000	(Philippines) Michael Bibat (2)
7 Oct	ICTSI Riviera Championship	Cavite	2,000,000	(Philippines) Juvic Pagunsan (16)
28 Oct	Pradera Verde Championship	Pampanga	2,000,000	(Netherlands) Guido van der Valk (5)
18 Nov	ICTSI Villamor Match Play Invitational	Manila	2,000,000	(Philippines) Antonio Lascuña (23)
