= 2014 Philippine Golf Tour =

Golf tour season

2014 Philippine Golf Tour season
- Duration: 6 February 2014 – 14 November 2014
- Number of official events: 17
- Most wins: (Philippines) Antonio Lascuña (5)
- Order of Merit: (Philippines) Antonio Lascuña

The 2014 Philippine Golf Tour, titled as the 2014 ICTSI Philippine Golf Tour for sponsorship reasons, was the sixth season of the Philippine Golf Tour, the main professional golf tour in the Philippines since it was formed in 2009.

== Schedule ==
The following table lists official events during the 2014 season.

Date	Tournament	Location	Purse (₱)	Winner (Note: The number in brackets after each winner's name is the number of Philippine Golf Tour events they had won up to and including that tournament.)	OWGR points	Other tours (Note: ADT − Asian Development Tour.)
9 Feb	TCC Invitational	Laguna	5,000,000	(Philippines) Cassius Casas (3)	n/a	
22 Mar	ICTSI Splendido Classic	Batangas	1,500,000	(Philippines) Jay Bayron (6)	n/a	
29 Mar	ICTSI Camp John Hay Championship	Batangas	2,000,000	(Philippines) Jun Rates (1)	n/a	
12 Apr	ICTSI Eagle Ridge Invitational	Cavite	3,000,000	(Philippines) Antonio Lascuña (6)	n/a	
26 Apr	ICTSI Sherwood Hills Classic	Cavite	3,500,000	(Philippines) Charles Hong (2)	n/a	
10 May	ICTSI Valley Challenge	Rizal	2,000,000	(Philippines) Antonio Lascuña (7)	n/a	
31 May	ICTSI Riviera Classic	Cavite	US$60,000	(Philippines) Elmer Salvador (8)	6	ADT
7 Jun	ICTSI Orchard Championship	Manila	US$60,000	(Philippines) Rufino Bayron (1)	6	ADT
20 Jun	ICTSI Manila Masters	Manila	3,500,000	(Philippines) Miguel Tabuena (4)	n/a	
19 Jul	ICTSI Iloilo Challenge	Iloilo	1,000,000	(Philippines) Cassius Casas (4)	n/a	
26 Jul	ICTSI Negros Occidental Classic	Negros Occidental	1,000,000	(Philippines) Antonio Lascuña (8)	n/a	
30 Aug	Aboitiz Invitational	Cebu	US$100,000	(Philippines) Antonio Lascuña (9)	6	ADT
6 Sep	ICTSI Pilipinas Invitational	Manila	3,500,000	(Philippines) Antonio Lascuña (10)	n/a	
20 Sep	ICTSI Royal Northwoods Championship	Luzon	1,500,000	(Philippines) Zanieboy Gialon (3)	n/a	
11 Oct	ICTSI Summit Point Classic	Manila	1,000,000	(Philippines) Arnold Villacencio (1)	n/a	
24 Oct	ICTSI Canlubang Invitational	Laguna	1,500,000	(Philippines) Clyde Mondilla (1)	n/a	
14 Nov	ICTSI Tournament Players Championship	Manila	3,500,000	(Philippines) Mars Pucay (3)	n/a	

== Order of Merit ==
The Order of Merit was based on prize money won during the season, calculated in Philippine pesos.

Position	Player	Prize money (₱)
1	(Philippines) Antonio Lascuña	3,181,565
2	(Philippines) Miguel Tabuena	1,705,168
3	(Philippines) Elmer Salvador	1,686,425
4	(Philippines) Charles Hong	1,364,850
5	(Philippines) Mars Pucay	1,304,079
