= 2026 Philippine Golf Tour =

Golf tour season

2026 Philippine Golf Tour season
- Duration: 27 January 2026 – 11 December 2026
- Number of official events: 12

The 2026 Philippine Golf Tour, titled as the 2026 ICTSI Philippine Golf Tour for sponsorship reasons, is the 18th season of the Philippine Golf Tour, the main professional golf tour in the Philippines since it was formed in 2009.

== Schedule ==
The following table lists official events during the 2026 season.

Date	Tournament	Location	Purse (₱)	Winner (Note: The number in brackets after each winner's name is the number of Philippine Golf Tour events they had won up to and including that tournament.)
30 Jan	TCC Invitational	Laguna	6,500,000	(United States) Micah Lauren Shin (2)
27 Mar	ICTSI Lakewood Championship	Central Luzon	3,000,000	(Philippines) Justin Quiban (3)
22 May	ICTSI Caliraya Springs Championship	Laguna	2,500,000	(Philippines) Angelo Que (12)
3 Jul	ICTSI Pinewoods Challenge	Benguet	2,500,000	(Philippines) Lloyd Jefferson Go (2)
10 Jul	ICTSI Pradera Verde Championship	Pampanga	2,000,000	(Philippines) Lloyd Jefferson Go (3)
11 Sep	ICTSI Summit Point Championship	Batangas	2,500,000	(Philippines) Angelo Que (13)
24 Sep	ICTSI Negros Occidental Classic	Negros Occidental	2,500,000	(Philippines) Art Arbole (1)
2 Oct	ICTSI Iloilo Golf Challenge	Iloilo	2,500,000	(Philippines) Jhonnel Ababa (9)
15 Oct	ICTSI Pueblo de Oro Championship	Mindanao	2,500,000	(Philippines) Rupert Zaragosa (4)
23 Oct	ICTSI South Pacific Classic	Davao	2,500,000	(Philippines) Clyde Mondilla (13)
30 Oct	ICTSI Apo Golf Classic	Davao	3,000,000	(United States) Micah Lauren Shin (3)
20 Nov	ICTSI The Country Club Match Play Invitational	Laguna		
