= 2016 Philippine Golf Tour =

Golf tour season

2016 Philippine Golf Tour season
- Duration: 10 February 2016 – 24 September 2016
- Number of official events: 16
- Most wins: (Philippines) Antonio Lascuña (5)
- Order of Merit: (Philippines) Antonio Lascuña

The 2016 Philippine Golf Tour, titled as the 2016 ICTSI Philippine Golf Tour for sponsorship reasons, was the eighth season of the Philippine Golf Tour, the main professional golf tour in the Philippines since it was formed in 2009.

== Schedule ==
The following table lists official events during the 2016 season.

Date	Tournament	Location	Purse (₱)	Winner (Note: The number in brackets after each winner's name is the number of Philippine Golf Tour events they had won up to and including that tournament.)	OWGR points	Other tours (Note: ADT − Asian Development Tour.)
13 Feb	ICTSI Anvaya Cove Invitational	Bataan	3,500,000	(Philippines) Miguel Tabuena (9)	n/a	
2 Apr	ICTSI Luisita Championship	Tarlac	3,500,000	(Philippines) Antonio Lascuña (13)	n/a	
16 Apr	ICTSI Manila Southwoods Championship	Manila	US$60,000	(Malaysia) Gavin Green (n/a)	7	ADT
23 Apr	ICTSI Sherwood Hills Classic	Cavite	US$60,000	(Sweden) Oscar Zetterwall (n/a)	6	ADT
7 May	ICTSI Manila Masters	Manila	3,500,000	(Philippines) Clyde Mondilla (4)	n/a	
21 May	ICTSI Calatagan Invitational	Batangas	2,000,000	(Philippines) Clyde Mondilla (5)	n/a	
3 Jun	ICTSI Eagle Ridge Invitational	Cavite	2,000,000	(Philippines) Antonio Lascuña (14)	n/a	
25 Jun	ICTSI Forest Hills Championship	Rizal	2,000,000	(Philippines) Antonio Lascuña (15)	n/a	
9 Jul	ICTSI Bacolod Challenge	Negros Occidental	1,500,000	(Philippines) Antonio Lascuña (16)	n/a	
16 Jul	ICTSI Negros Occidental Classic	Negros Occidental	1,500,000	(Philippines) Frankie Miñoza (6)	n/a	
6 Aug	Aboitiz Invitational	Cebu	US$100,000	(Philippines) Jay Bayron (8)	6	ADT
13 Aug	ICTSI Riviera Classic	Cavite	1,500,000	(Philippines) Jay Bayron (9)	n/a	
27 Aug	ICTSI Classic	Batangas	2,000,000	(Philippines) Clyde Mondilla (6)	n/a	
3 Sep	ICTSI Splendido Classic	Batangas	1,500,000	(Philippines) Elmer Salvador (10)	n/a	
17 Sep	Central Azucarera de Tarlac Open	Tarlac	2,500,000	(United States) Micah Lauren Shin (1)	n/a	
24 Sep	ICTSI Tournament Players Championship	Manila	3,500,000	(Philippines) Antonio Lascuña (17)	n/a	

== Order of Merit ==
The Order of Merit was based on prize money won during the season, calculated in Philippine pesos.

Position	Player	Prize money (₱)
1	(Philippines) Antonio Lascuña	3,695,949
2	(Philippines) Clyde Mondilla	2,624,588
3	(Philippines) Jay Bayron	2,569,466
4	(Philippines) Elmer Salvador	1,414,731
5	(United States) Micah Lauren Shin	1,210,988
