= 2019 Philippine Golf Tour =

Golf tour season

2019 Philippine Golf Tour season
- Duration: 23 April 2019 – 12 October 2019
- Number of official events: 10
- Most wins: (Philippines) Juvic Pagunsan (4)
- Order of Merit: (Philippines) Juvic Pagunsan

The 2019 Philippine Golf Tour, titled as the 2019 ICTSI Philippine Golf Tour for sponsorship reasons, was the 11th season of the Philippine Golf Tour, the main professional golf tour in the Philippines since it was formed in 2009.

== Schedule ==
The following table lists official events during the 2019 season.

| Date | Tournament | Location | Purse (₱) | Winner (Note: The number in brackets after each winner's name is the number of Philippine Golf Tour events they had won up to and including that tournament.) |
|---|---|---|---|---|
| 26 Feb | TCC Invitational | Laguna | 5,000,000 | (South Korea) Tom Kim (2) |
| 8 Jun | ICTSI Club Filipino de Cebu Invitational | Cebu | 3,000,000 | (Netherlands) Guido van der Valk (2) |
| 15 Jun | ICTSI Bacolod Challenge | Negros Occidental | 3,000,000 | (Philippines) Juvic Pagunsan (12) |
| 22 Jun | ICTSI Negros Occidental Classic | Negros Occidental | 3,000,000 | (Philippines) Juvic Pagunsan (13) |
| 29 Jun | ICTSI Iloilo Challenge | Iloilo | 3,000,000 | (Philippines) Juvic Pagunsan (14) |
| 10 Aug | ICTSI Riviera Classic | Cavite | 2,500,000 | (Philippines) Juvic Pagunsan (15) |
| 14 Sep | ICTSI Pueblo de Oro Championship | Mindanao | 2,500,000 | (Philippines) Reymon Jaraula (1) |
| 21 Sep | ICTSI Del Monte Championship | Mindanao | 2,500,000 | (Philippines) Jhonnel Ababa (5) |
| 5 Oct | ICTSI Apo Invitational | Davao | 3,000,000 | (Philippines) Antonio Lascuña (20) |
| 12 Oct | ICTSI South Pacific Classic | Davao | 3,000,000 | (Philippines) Antonio Lascuña (21) |

== Order of Merit ==
The Order of Merit was based on prize money won during the season, calculated in Philippine pesos.

| Position | Player | Prize money (₱) |
|---|---|---|
| 1 | (Philippines) Juvic Pagunsan | 2,070,000 |
| 2 | (Philippines) Antonio Lascuña | 1,991,930 |
| 3 | (Netherlands) Guido van der Valk | 1,234,575 |
| 4 | (Philippines) Reymon Jaraula | 1,173,325 |
| 5 | (Philippines) Michael Bibat | 1,128,417 |

== PGT Asia ==
2019 PGT Asia season
- Duration: 15 April 2019 – 24 January 2020
- Number of official events: 8 (Note: One further tournament was scheduled but was cancelled.)
- Order of Merit: (Philippines) Antonio Lascuña

The 2019 PGT Asia was the third season of the PGT Asia.

=== Schedule ===
The following table lists official events during the 2019 season.

| Date | Tournament | Location | Purse (US$) | Winner (Note: The number in brackets after each winner's name is the number of PGT Asia events they had won up to and including that tournament.) | Other tours (Note: TWN − Taiwan PGA Tour.) |
|---|---|---|---|---|---|
| 18 Apr | ICTSI Luisita Championship | Tarlac | 100,000 | (Thailand) Namchok Tantipokhakul (1) | |
| 26 May | Daan Open | Taiwan | NT$3,000,000 | (Thailand) Wisut Artjanawat (1) | TWN |
| 12 Jul | ICTSI Manila Southwoods Championship | Manila | 100,000 | (Philippines) Angelo Que (1) | |
| 7 Sep | Aboitiz Invitational | Manila | 100,000 | (United States) Tarik Can (1) | |
| 29 Sep | Nan Pao Open | Taiwan | NT$3,000,000 | (Philippines) Antonio Lascuña (2) | TWN |
| 19 Oct | CAT Open | Tarlac | 100,000 | (Australia) Tim Stewart (1) | TWN |
| 26 Oct | ICTSI Summit Point World 18 Challenge | Batangas | 100,000 | (Philippines) Juvic Pagunsan (2) | |
| ~~17 Jan~~ | ICTSI Eagle Ridge Invitational | Cavite | – | Cancelled (Note: Cancelled due to the Taal Volcano eruption.) | |
| 24 Jan | ICTSI Pradera Verde Classic | Pampanga | 100,000 | (Philippines) Clyde Mondilla (3) | |

=== Order of Merit ===
The Order of Merit was based on prize money won during the season, calculated in U.S. dollars.

| Position | Player | Prize money ($) |
|---|---|---|
| 1 | (Philippines) Antonio Lascuña | 46,075 |
| 2 | (Philippines) Clyde Mondilla | 41,323 |
| 3 | (Australia) Tim Stewart | 32,570 |
| 4 | (Thailand) Namchok Tantipokhakul | 21,972 |
| 5 | (Thailand) Wisut Artjanawat | 21,389 |
