= Tim Stewart =

Australian professional golfer (born 1985)

Personal information
- Nationality: Australia
- Born: 15 February 1985 (age 41) Sydney, Australia
- Height: 1.99 m (6 ft 6 in)
- Weight: 100 kg (220 lb; 16 st)

Career
- Sport: Golf
- Turned professional: 2008
- Former tours: Asian Tour; Challenge Tour; PGA Tour China
- Professional wins: 3

Best results in major championships
- Masters Tournament: DNP
- PGA Championship: DNP
- U.S. Open: DNP
- The Open Championship: CUT: 2009

Tim Stewart (born 15 February 1985) is an Australian professional golfer. A former Australian Amateur champion, he turned professional in November 2008 and played primarily on the Asian Tour.

== Early life ==
In 1985, Stewart was born in Sydney, Australia. He moved to Singapore in 1989 with his family. Stewart first began playing golf at the age of seven, when his father began taking him to the Green Fairways driving range in Singapore. After another stop in southeast Asia, this time in Kuala Lumpur, Malaysia, he returned to Sydney in 1998.

== Amateur career ==
In 2003, Stewart began playing as an amateur while attending school. In 2005, he won the Monash Masters. In that same year, he also finished as runner-up in the Mollymook Open. In 2006, Stewart made a huge splash by winning the Australian Amateur at Royal Hobart Golf Club.

With that win under his belt, Stewart began playing full-time, finishing as runner-up in the Rice Planters Amateur, Eastern Amateur, Dunes Medal, and Yowani Open Amateur later in the year. He was able to capture more championships in 2007, at the historic Riversdale Cup and the Singapore Amateur. Stewart also finished second at both the British Amateur as well as the New South Wales Amateur Championship. Finally, Stewart scored another win in 2008, this time at the Tasmanian Open, a professional event.

== Professional career ==
In November 2008, Stewart announced that he was turning pro. In 2009, Stewart played on the Asian Tour. His best finish was a T-9 at the Iskandar Johor Open On 1 April 2009, Stewart clinched a place in the 2009 Open Championship at the International Final Qualifying in Asia, capturing the final spot in a nine-man playoff.

In 2010, Stewart played on the Challenge Tour, the European Tour's developmental tour. His best finish was a T-9 at the 2010 The Princess. From 2011–2013, Stewart returned to the Asian Tour. In 2014, he played on the PGA Tour China.

== Personal life ==
Stewart lives in Sydney, Australia on its Northern Beaches.

== Amateur wins ==
- 2005 Monash Masters
- 2006 Australian Amateur
- 2007 Riversdale Cup, Singapore Open Amateur Championship

== Professional wins (3) ==
=== PGT Asia wins (1) ===
No.	Date	Tournament	Winning score	Margin of victory	Runner-up
1	19 Oct 2019	CAT Open^{1}	−15 (67-67-67-72=273)	Playoff	(Philippines) Clyde Mondilla

^{1}Co-sanctioned by the Taiwan PGA Tour

=== Other wins (2) ===
- 2008 Tasmanian Open (as an amateur)
- 2018 Tahiti Open

== Team appearances ==
Amateur

- Eisenhower Trophy (representing Australia): 2008
- Bonallack Trophy (representing Asia/Pacific): 2008
- Nomura Cup (representing Australia): 2007 (winners)
- Sloan Morpeth Trophy (representing Australia): 2007
- Southern Cross Cup (representing Australia): 2007 (winners)
- Four Nations Cup (representing Australia): 2007 (winners)
- Australian Men's Interstate Teams Matches (representing New South Wales): 2006 (winners), 2007 (winners), 2008
