= 2025 Philippine Golf Tour =

Golf tour season

2025 Philippine Golf Tour season
- Duration: 28 January 2025 – 28 November 2025
- Number of official events: 12
- Most wins: (Philippines) Keanu Jahns (3)
- Order of Merit: (Philippines) Angelo Que

The 2025 Philippine Golf Tour, titled as the 2025 ICTSI Philippine Golf Tour for sponsorship reasons, was the 17th season of the Philippine Golf Tour, the main professional golf tour in the Philippines since it was formed in 2009.

== Schedule ==
The following table lists official events during the 2025 season.

Date	Tournament	Location	Purse (₱)	Winner (Note: The number in brackets after each winner's name is the number of Philippine Golf Tour events they had won up to and including that tournament.)
31 Jan	TCC Invitational	Laguna	6,000,000	(South Korea) Gwon Min-wook (1)
27 Feb	ICTSI Pradera Verde Championship	Pampanga	2,500,000	(Philippines) Angelo Que (10)
13 Mar	ICTSI Eagle Ridge Championship	Cavite	2,000,000	(Philippines) Angelo Que (11)
6 Jun	ICTSI Forest Hills Classic	Rizal	2,500,000	(Netherlands) Guido van der Valk (7)
8 Aug	ICTSI Caliraya Springs Championship	Laguna	2,500,000	(Philippines) Keanu Jahns (2)
5 Sep	ICTSI Bacolod Golf Challenge	Negros Occidental	2,000,000	(Philippines) Keanu Jahns (3)
12 Sep	ICTSI Negros Occidental Classic	Negros Occidental	2,000,000	(Philippines) Rupert Zaragosa (3)
17 Oct	ICTSI Del Monte Championship	Mindanao	3,500,000	(Philippines) Reymon Jaraula (4)
24 Oct	ICTSI Apo Golf Classic	Davao	3,500,000	(Philippines) Fidel Concepcion (1)
31 Oct	ICTSI South Pacific Classic	Davao	3,500,000	(Philippines) Jeffren Lumbo (1)
21 Nov; ~~25 Jul~~	ICTSI Valley Golf Challenge	Rizal	3,500,000	(Philippines) Carl Jano Corpus (1)
28 Nov	ICTSI The Country Club Match Play Invitational	Laguna	2,000,000	(Philippines) Keanu Jahns (4)

== Order of Merit ==
The Order of Merit was based on prize money won during the season, calculated in Philippine pesos.

Position	Player	Prize money (₱)
1	(Philippines) Angelo Que	1,581,116
2	(Philippines) Keanu Jahns	1,484,183
3	(Philippines) Fidel Concepcion	1,282,083
4	(Netherlands) Guido van der Valk	1,277,450
5	(Philippines) Rupert Zaragosa	1,112,633
