= 2023 Philippine Golf Tour =

Golf tour season

2023 Philippine Golf Tour season
- Duration: 7 February 2023 – 24 November 2023
- Number of official events: 12
- Most wins: (Philippines) Jhonnel Ababa (2) (Philippines) Clyde Mondilla (2) (Philippines) Miguel Tabuena (2)
- Order of Merit: (Philippines) Jhonnel Ababa

The 2023 Philippine Golf Tour, titled as the 2023 ICTSI Philippine Golf Tour for sponsorship reasons, was the 15th season of the Philippine Golf Tour, the main professional golf tour in the Philippines since it was formed in 2009.

== Schedule ==
The following table lists official events during the 2023 season.

Date	Tournament	Location	Purse (₱)	Winner (Note: The number in brackets after each winner's name is the number of Philippine Golf Tour events they had won up to and including that tournament.)
10 Feb	TCC Invitational	Laguna	6,000,000	(Netherlands) Guido van der Valk (6)
18 Mar	ICTSI Negros Occidental Classic	Negros Occidental	2,000,000	(Philippines) Ira Alido (2)
25 Mar	ICTSI Iloilo Challenge	Iloilo	2,000,000	(Philippines) Rupert Zaragosa (1)
21 Apr	ICTSI Caliraya Springs Championship	Laguna	2,500,000	(Philippines) Antonio Lascuña (24)
12 May	ICTSI Luisita Championship	Tarlac	2,000,000	(Philippines) Miguel Tabuena (14)
27 May	ICTSI Villamor Philippine Masters	Manila	2,500,000	(Philippines) Jhonnel Ababa (6)
9 Jun	ICTSI Valley Challenge	Rizal	2,000,000	(Philippines) Reymon Jaraula (2)
23 Jun	ICTSI Forest Hills Classic	Rizal	2,000,000	(Philippines) Clyde Mondilla (10)
8 Sep	ICTSI Del Monte Championship	Mindanao	2,500,000	(Philippines) Clyde Mondilla (11)
15 Sep	ICTSI South Pacific Classic	Davao	2,000,000	(Philippines) Justin Quiban (2)
29 Sep	ICTSI Mimosa Plus Championship	Central Luzon	2,500,000	(Philippines) Jhonnel Ababa (7)
24 Nov	ICTSI The Country Club Match Play Invitational	Laguna	2,000,000	(Philippines) Miguel Tabuena (15)

== Order of Merit ==
The Order of Merit was based on prize money won during the season, calculated in Philippine pesos.

Position	Player	Prize money (₱)
1	(Philippines) Jhonnel Ababa	1,499,825
2	(Philippines) Antonio Lascuña	1,325,196
3	(Philippines) Clyde Mondilla	1,305,250
4	(Philippines) Reymon Jaraula	1,064,850
5	(Philippines) Rupert Zaragosa	1,002,825
