= 2012 Philippine Golf Tour =

Golf tour season

2012 Philippine Golf Tour season
- Duration: 26 January 2012 – 22 December 2012
- Number of official events: 16
- Most wins: (Philippines) Antonio Lascuña (3)
- Order of Merit: (Philippines) Antonio Lascuña

The 2012 Philippine Golf Tour, titled as the 2012 ICTSI Philippine Golf Tour for sponsorship reasons, was the fourth season of the Philippine Golf Tour, the main professional golf tour in the Philippines since it was formed in 2009.

== Schedule ==
The following table lists official events during the 2012 season.

Date	Tournament	Location	Purse (₱)	Winner (Note: The number in brackets after each winner's name is the number of Philippine Golf Tour events they had won up to and including that tournament.)	Other tours (Note: ADT − Asian Development Tour.)
29 Jan	TCC Invitational	Laguna	4,500,000	(Philippines) Juvic Pagunsan (9)	
30 Mar	ICTSI Splendido Classic	Batangas	1,000,000	(Philippines) Miguel Tabuena (1)	
20 Apr	ICTSI Camp John Hay Championship	Batangas	1,000,000	(Philippines) Marvin Dumandan (5)	
28 Apr	ICTSI Sherwood Hills Classic	Cavite	2,500,000	(Philippines) Elmer Salvador (5)	
25 May	ICTSI Eagle Ridge Invitational	Cavite	1,000,000	(Philippines) Antonio Lascuña (1)	
8 Jun	ICTSI Eastridge Classic	Rizal	1,000,000	(Philippines) Miguel Tabuena (2)	
30 Jun	ICTSI Manila Southwoods Championship	Manila	2,500,000	(Philippines) Antonio Lascuña (2)	
20 Jul	ICTSI Negros Occidental Classic	Negros Occidental	1,000,000	(Philippines) Zanieboy Gialon (1)	
27 Jul	ICTSI Iloilo Challenge	Iloilo	1,000,000	(Philippines) Mars Pucay (2)	
11 Aug	Aboitiz Invitational	Cebu	US$65,000	(Philippines) Elmer Salvador (6)	ADT
18 Aug	ICTSI Orchard Championship	Manila	US$60,000	(Singapore) Quincy Quek (n/a)	ADT
7 Sep	ICTSI Pueblo de Oro Championship	Mindanao	1,000,000	(Philippines) Charles Hong (1)	
14 Sep	ICTSI Rancho Palos Verdes Classic	Davao	1,000,000	(Philippines) Carl Santos-Ocampo (1)	
26 Oct	ICTSI Calatagan Challenge	Batangas	1,000,000	(Philippines) Mhark Fernando (3)	
16 Nov	ICTSI Canlubang Invitational	Laguna	1,000,000	(Philippines) Zanieboy Gialon (2)	
22 Dec	ICTSI Wack Wack Championship	Manila	2,500,000	(Philippines) Antonio Lascuña (3)	

== Order of Merit ==
The Order of Merit was based on prize money won during the season, calculated in Philippine pesos.

Position	Player	Prize money (₱)
1	(Philippines) Antonio Lascuña	2,247,640
2	(Philippines) Elmer Salvador	1,685,160
3	(Philippines) Zanieboy Gialon	905,104
4	(Philippines) Miguel Tabuena	759,199
5	(Philippines) Jay Bayron	691,175
