= 2020 Philippine Golf Tour =

Golf tour season

2020 Philippine Golf Tour season
- Duration: 4 March 2020 – 11 December 2020
- Number of official events: 3 (Note: A further two tournaments were scheduled but were cancelled.)

The 2020 Philippine Golf Tour, titled as the 2020 ICTSI Philippine Golf Tour for sponsorship reasons, was the 12th season of the Philippine Golf Tour, the main professional golf tour in the Philippines since it was formed in 2009.

== Schedule ==
The following table lists official events during the 2020 season.

| Date | Tournament | Location | Purse (₱) | Winner (Note: The number in brackets after each winner's name is the number of Philippine Golf Tour events they had won up to and including that tournament.) |
|---|---|---|---|---|
| 7 Mar | TCC Invitational | Laguna | 5,000,000 | (Netherlands) Guido van der Valk (3) |
| ~~28 Mar~~ | ICTSI Summit Point Challenge | Batangas | – | Cancelled |
| ~~29 May~~ | ICTSI Royal Northwoods Challenge | Luzon | – | Cancelled |
| 20 Nov | ICTSI Riviera Invitational Challenge | Cavite | 2,500,000 | (Philippines) Antonio Lascuña (22) |
| 11 Dec | PGT Riviera Championship | Cavite | 2,500,000 | (Philippines) Ira Alido (1) |
