= 2024 Philippine Golf Tour =

Golf tour season

2024 Philippine Golf Tour season
- Duration: 23 January 2024 – 29 November 2024
- Number of official events: 12
- Most wins: (Philippines) Antonio Lascuña (2)
- Order of Merit: (Philippines) Antonio Lascuña

The 2024 Philippine Golf Tour, titled as the 2024 ICTSI Philippine Golf Tour for sponsorship reasons, was the 16th season of the Philippine Golf Tour, the main professional golf tour in the Philippines since it was formed in 2009.

== Schedule ==
The following table lists official events during the 2024 season.

Date	Tournament	Location	Purse (₱)	Winner (Note: The number in brackets after each winner's name is the number of Philippine Golf Tour events they had won up to and including that tournament.)
26 Jan	TCC Invitational	Laguna	6,000,000	(Philippines) Antonio Lascuña (25)
15 Mar	ICTSI Apo Golf Classic	Davao	2,500,000	(Philippines) Jhonnel Ababa (8)
22 Mar	ICTSI Palos Verdes Championship	Davao	2,000,000	(Philippines) Lloyd Jefferson Go (1)
12 Apr	ICTSI Caliraya Springs Championship	Laguna	2,500,000	(Philippines) Clyde Mondilla (12)
25 May	ICTSI Villamor Philippine Masters	Manila	2,000,000	(Philippines) Angelo Que (9)
7 Jun	ICTSI Lakewood Championship	Luzon	2,500,000	(Philippines) Sean Ramos (1)
19 Jul	ICTSI Splendido Taal Championship	Batangas	2,000,000	(Philippines) Antonio Lascuña (26)
21 Sep	ICTSI Forest Hills Classic	Rizal	2,000,000	(Philippines) Keanu Jahns (1)
11 Oct	ICTSI Iloilo Golf Challenge	Iloilo	2,500,000	(Philippines) Zanieboy Gialon (6)
18 Oct	ICTSI Bacolod Golf Challenge	Negros Occidental	2,500,000	(Philippines) Reymon Jaraula (3)
25 Oct	ICTSI Negros Occidental Classic	Negros Occidental	2,500,000	(Philippines) Rupert Zaragosa (2)
29 Nov	ICTSI The Country Club Match Play Invitational	Laguna	2,000,000	(Philippines) Arnold Villacencio (2)

== Order of Merit ==
The Order of Merit was based on prize money won during the season, calculated in Philippine pesos.

Position	Player	Prize money (₱)
1	(Philippines) Antonio Lascuña	1,449,729
2	(Philippines) Angelo Que	1,377,500
3	(Philippines) Reymon Jaraula	1,226,950
4	(Philippines) Keanu Jahns	1,044,250
5	(Philippines) Rupert Zaragosa	983,000
