= Iskandar Johor Open =

Tournament information
- Location: Johor Bahru, Malaysia
- Established: 2007
- Courses: Horizon Hills Golf & Country Club
- Par: 72
- Length: 6,941 yards (6,347 m)
- Tours: European Tour; Asian Tour
- Format: Stroke play
- Prize fund: US$2,000,000
- Month played: December
- Final year: 2012

Tournament record score
- Aggregate: 268 Pádraig Harrington (2010)
- To par: −20 as above

Final champion
- (Spain) Sergio García
- Location in Malaysia

The Iskandar Johor Open was a golf tournament held in Malaysia and part of the Asian Tour. It was first held in 2007 when it was played at the Royal Johor Country Club in Johor Bahru.

The 2008 purse was US$500,000. In 2009, Johor Open's purse was doubled to a size of US$1 million. The prize fund in 2010 was US$1.25 million, the joint richest event sanctioned solely by the Asian Tour, alongside the Hero Honda Indian Open, and 8th richest event of the Asian Tour. The 2011 Johor Open was added to the European Tour and the purse increased to US$2 million. In 2012, the Johor Open was no longer a European Tour event but the prize money remained at US$2 million. The tournament was discontinued after 2012.

The Championship was supported by the Johor state government and the Iskandar Region Development Authority (IRDA).

== Winners ==
Year	Tour(s) (Note: ASA − Asian Tour; EUR − European Tour.)	Winner	Score	To par	Margin of victory	Runner(s)-up
2012	ASA	(Spain) Sergio García	198 (Note: Shortened to 54 holes due to weather.)	−18	3 strokes	(United States) Jonathan Moore
2011	ASA, EUR	(Netherlands) Joost Luiten	198	−15	1 stroke	(Sweden) Daniel Chopra
2010	ASA	(Republic of Ireland) Pádraig Harrington	268	−20	3 strokes	(South Korea) Noh Seung-yul
2009	ASA	(South Korea) K. J. Choi	196	−20	4 strokes	(Thailand) Chapchai Nirat
2008	ASA	(South Africa) Retief Goosen	276	−12	2 strokes	(Thailand) Thaworn Wiratchant
2007	ASA	(Philippines) Artemio Murakami	279	−5	1 stroke	(Philippines) Antonio Lascuña (Scotland) Simon Yates
