= Tom Kim =

South Korean professional golfer (born 2002)

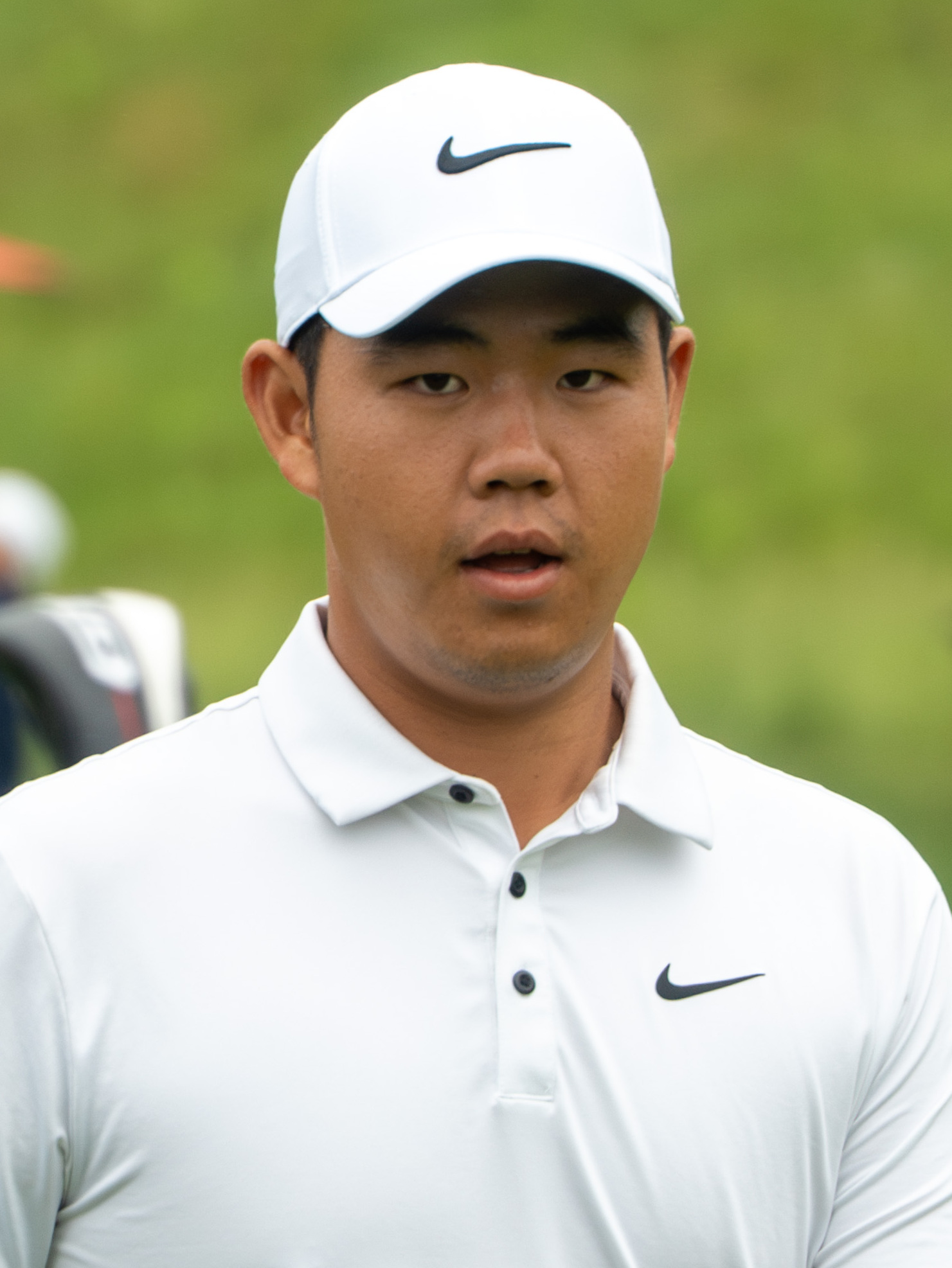
- Kim at the 2025 Travelers Championship

Personal information
- Full name: Kim Joo-hyung
- Nickname: Tom
- Nationality: South Korea
- Born: 21 June 2002 (age 24) Seoul, South Korea
- Height: 6 ft 0 in (183 cm)

Career
- Sport: Golf
- Turned professional: 2018
- Current tours: PGA Tour; European Tour
- Former tours: Asian Tour; Korean Tour; Asian Development Tour; All Thailand Golf Tour; Philippine Golf Tour
- Professional wins: 14
- Highest ranking: 11 (15 October 2023) (as of 8 November 2026)

Number of wins by tour
- PGA Tour: 4
- European Tour: 1
- Asian Tour: 2
- Other: 8

Best results in major championships
- Masters Tournament: T16: 2023
- PGA Championship: T26: 2024
- U.S. Open: 3rd: 2026
- The Open Championship: T2: 2023

Achievements and awards
- Korean Tour Order of Merit winner: 2021
- Korean Tour Player of the Year: 2021
- Asian Tour Order of Merit winner: 2020–21–22
Medal record
Men's golf
Representing South Korea
Asian Games
Gold medal – first place	2026 Aichi–Nagoya	Men's individual
Silver medal – second place	2026 Aichi–Nagoya	Men's team

Kim Joo-hyung (Korean: 김주형; born 21 June 2002), commonly known as Tom Kim, is a South Korean professional golfer. He has won four times on the PGA Tour, and twice on both the Asian Tour and the Korean Tour.

== Early life and amateur career ==
Kim was born in Seoul, South Korea, and is the son of a professional golfer, Kim Chang-ik, who played on the Buy.com Tour before becoming a teaching professional. As a result, Kim was based in Australia, the Philippines and later Thailand for a number of years. In 2018 he won the Philippine Amateur Open Championship and the W Express RVF Cup Amateur Championship.

== Professional career ==
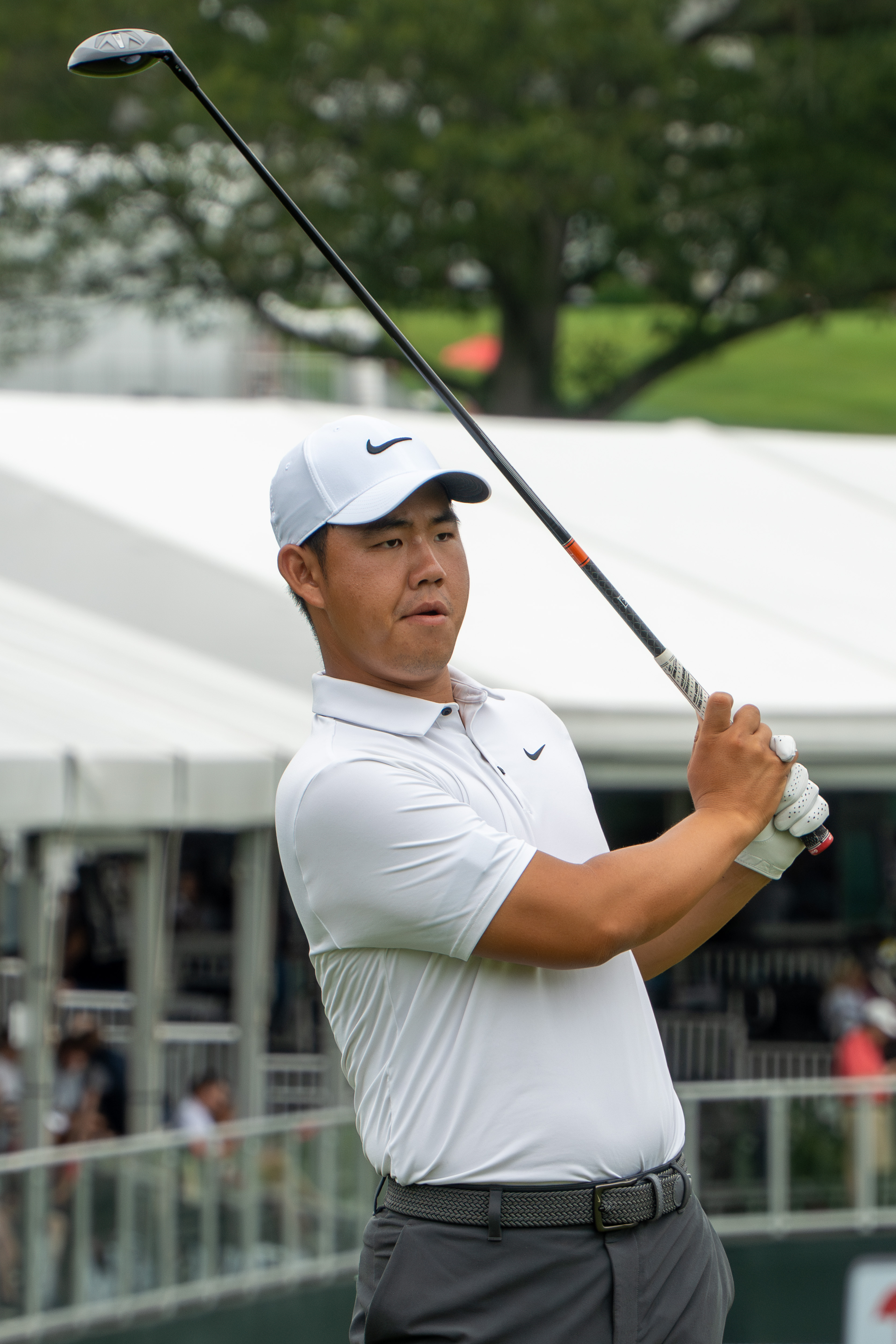
Tom Kim during the 2025 Travelers Championship

Kim turned professional in May 2018, playing on the Philippine Golf Tour. In 2019 he initially played mostly on the Asian Development Tour. In March he had two fourth-place finishes in Malaysia and then two runner-up finishes in Thailand before winning his first event, the PGM ADT Championship, in Malaysia in late June, six strokes ahead of the field. He won the Ciputra Golfpreneur Tournament in Indonesia in August, after a playoff, and the Raya Pakistan Open by nine shots in October. His third win gave him automatic promotion to the Asian Tour for the rest of 2019. In November, he won the Panasonic Open India, becoming, at 17 years and 149 days, the second youngest professional to win on the Asian Tour. The event was reduced to 54 holes because of smog.

In early 2020, he finished fourth in the SMBC Singapore Open. The event was part of the Open Qualifying Series and his high finish gave him an entry into the 2020 Open Championship, his first major championship.

Kim won the 2022 Singapore International, beating Rattanon Wannasrichan in a playoff. The following week he recorded a runner-up finish at the SMBC Singapore Open, seeing him finish as the leading money winner of the 2020–21–22 Asian Tour season. In July, Kim finished solo-third at the Genesis Scottish Open, a co-sanctioned event between the PGA Tour and the European Tour; he was one of three players who had earned entry to the tournament through the Korea Professional Golfers' Association (KPGA). With a T47 finish at the 2022 Open Championship, Kim became eligible for Special Temporary Membership on the PGA Tour for the remainder of the 2021–22 season. He earned his PGA Tour card for the 2022–23 season with a 7th place finish at the Rocket Mortgage Classic. The following week, he shot a final-round 61 to win the Wyndham Championship despite opening the tournament with a quadruple-bogey 8. That victory gave him entry into the 2022 FedEx Cup Playoffs.

Kim qualified for the International team at the 2022 Presidents Cup; he won two and lost three of the five matches he played, and was hailed by the media as one of the stars of the event due to his entertaining play.

In October 2022, Kim won the Shriners Children's Open in Las Vegas, Nevada; in doing so, he became the second youngest two-time PGA Tour winner behind Ralph Guldahl, and the first player to win twice on tour before the age of 21 since Tiger Woods in 1996.

In October 2023, Kim won the Shriners Children's Open for the second consecutive time, joining Byron Nelson as the only golfers to have won the same PGA Tour event twice in the same season.

In July 2026, Kim won the Genesis Scottish Open for his first win since 2023. Kim achieved further success representing South Korea at the 2026 Asian Games, notably winning the gold medal in the men's individual event to secure an exemption from his country's mandatory military service.

== Personal life ==
Kim's nickname Tom is derived from Thomas the Tank Engine.

== Amateur wins ==
- 2017 Philippine Junior Amateur
- 2018 Philippine Amateur Open Championship, W Express RVF Cup Amateur Championship

== Professional wins (14) ==
=== PGA Tour wins (4) ===
No.	Date	Tournament	Winning score	Margin of victory	Runner(s)-up
1	7 Aug 2022	Wyndham Championship	−20 (67-64-68-61=260)	5 strokes	(United States) John Huh, (South Korea) Im Sung-jae
2	9 Oct 2022	Shriners Children's Open	−24 (65-67-62-66=260)	3 strokes	(United States) Patrick Cantlay, (United States) Matthew NeSmith
3	15 Oct 2023	Shriners Children's Open (2)	−20 (68-68-62-66=264)	1 stroke	(Canada) Adam Hadwin
4	12 Jul 2026	Genesis Scottish Open^{1}	−17 (65-66-68-64=263)	2 strokes	(Australia) Min Woo Lee

^{1}Co-sanctioned by the European Tour

PGA Tour playoff record (0–1)

No.	Year	Tournament	Opponent	Result
1	2024	Travelers Championship	(United States) Scottie Scheffler	Lost to par on first extra hole

=== European Tour wins (1) ===
Legend
Rolex Series (1)
Other European Tour (0)

No.	Date	Tournament	Winning score	Margin of victory	Runner-up
1	12 Jul 2026	Genesis Scottish Open^{1}	−17 (65-66-68-64=263)	2 strokes	(Australia) Min Woo Lee

^{1}Co-sanctioned by the PGA Tour

European Tour playoff record (0–1)

No.	Year	Tournament	Opponent	Result
1	2024	Genesis Championship	(South Korea) An Byeong-hun	Lost to birdie on first extra hole

=== Asian Tour wins (2) ===
No.	Date	Tournament	Winning score	Margin of victory	Runner(s)-up
1	17 Nov 2019	Panasonic Open India^{1}	−13 (70-68-65=203) (Note: Shortened to 54 holes due to weather.)	1 stroke	(India) S. Chikkarangappa, (India) Shiv Kapur
2	16 Jan 2022	Singapore International	−4 (72-73-69-70=284)	Playoff	(Thailand) Rattanon Wannasrichan

^{1}Co-sanctioned by the Professional Golf Tour of India

Asian Tour playoff record (1–0)

No.	Year	Tournament	Opponent	Result
1	2022	Singapore International	(Thailand) Rattanon Wannasrichan	Won with birdie on first extra hole

=== Korean Tour wins (2) ===
No.	Date	Tournament	Winning score	Margin of victory	Runner-up
1	12 Jul 2020	KPGA Gunsan CC Open	−16 (65-70-64-69=268)	2 strokes	(South Korea) Kim Min-kyu
2	13 Jun 2021	SK Telecom Open	−14 (67-70-65-68=270)	3 strokes	(South Korea) Kim Baek-jun (a)

Korean Tour playoff record (0–2)

No.	Year	Tournament	Opponent	Result
1	2020	Woosung Construction Aramir CC Busan Gyeongnam Open	(South Korea) Lee Ji-hoon	Lost to birdie on first extra hole
2	2024	Genesis Championship	(South Korea) An Byeong-hun	Lost to birdie on first extra hole

=== Asian Development Tour wins (3) ===
No.	Date	Tournament	Winning score	Margin of victory	Runner(s)-up
1	29 Jun 2019	Tiara Melaka Championship^{1}	−23 (69-63-67-66=265)	6 strokes	(Malaysia) Sukree Othman, (Japan) Naoki Sekito
2	24 Aug 2019	Ciputra Golfpreneur Tournament^{2}	−18 (69-68-66-67=270)	Playoff	(Singapore) Mardan Mamat
3	20 Oct 2019	Raya Pakistan Open	−17 (66-64-68-73=271)	9 strokes	(Pakistan) Muhammad Shabbir

^{1}Co-sanctioned by the Professional Golf of Malaysia Tour
^{2}Co-sanctioned by the PGA Tour of Indonesia

=== Philippine Golf Tour wins (2) ===
No.	Date	Tournament	Winning score	Margin of victory	Runner-up
1	7 Jul 2018	ICTSI Pueblo de Oro Championship	−18 (69-63-69-69=270)	1 stroke	(Philippines) Jobim Carlos
2	26 Apr 2019	TCC Invitational	+2 (75-71-70-74=290)	1 stroke	(Philippines) Keanu Jahns

=== Other wins (1) ===
No.	Date	Tournament	Winning score	Margin of victory	Runner-up
1	3 Oct 2026	Asian Games	−18 (67-66-65-64=262)	3 strokes	(Japan) Kazuki Higa

== Results in major championships ==
Results not in chronological order in 2020.

Tournament	2020	2021	2022	2023	2024	2025	2026
Masters Tournament				T16	T30	T52	
PGA Championship	CUT		CUT	CUT	T26	71	
U.S. Open			23	T8	T26	T33	3
The Open Championship	NT		T47	T2	CUT	CUT	CUT

Top 10
Did not play

CUT = missed the half-way cut
"T" = tied
NT = no tournament due to COVID-19 pandemic

=== Summary ===
Tournament	Wins	2nd	3rd	Top-5	Top-10	Top-25	Events	Cuts made
Masters Tournament	0	0	0	0	0	1	3	3
PGA Championship	0	0	0	0	0	0	5	2
U.S. Open	0	0	1	1	2	3	5	5
The Open Championship	0	1	0	1	1	1	5	2
Totals	0	1	1	2	3	5	18	12

- Most consecutive cuts made – 5 (2023 U.S. Open – 2024 U.S. Open)
- Longest streak of top-10s – 2 (2023 U.S. Open – 2023 Open Championship)

== Results in The Players Championship ==
Tournament	2023	2024	2025
The Players Championship	T51	WD	T42

WD = withdrew
"T" indicates a tie for a place

== Results in World Golf Championships ==
Tournament	2023
Match Play	T31

"T" = Tied

== Team appearances ==
Professional

- Presidents Cup (representing the International team): 2022, 2024, 2026
