= David Gleeson (golfer) =

Australian professional golfer (born 1978)

Personal information
- Nationality: Australia
- Born: 2 February 1978 (age 48) Dalby, Queensland, Australia
- Height: 1.74 m (5 ft 9 in)
- Weight: 68 kg (150 lb; 10.7 st)
- Children: 2

Career
- Sport: Golf
- College: International Pacific College
- Turned professional: 1998
- Current tours: Asian Tour; PGA Tour of Australasia
- Professional wins: 4

Number of wins by tour
- Asian Tour: 3
- Other: 1

Best results in major championships
- Masters Tournament: DNP
- PGA Championship: DNP
- U.S. Open: DNP
- The Open Championship: CUT: 2007

David Gleeson (born 2 February 1978) is an Australian professional golfer. He is currently playing on the Asian Tour where he has three victories.

== Early life and amateur career ==
In 1978, Gleeson was born in Queensland. He played amateur golf with notable golfers Adam Scott, Geoff Ogilvy, and Brett Rumford. He had his biggest amateur win at the 1996 Australian Amateur. He was also a part of the winning team at the 1996 Eisenhower Trophy.

== Professional career ==
In 1998, Gleeson turned professional. Gleeson joined the Asian Tour in 1999 but did not find immediate success, picking up only three top-10s in his first three seasons.

After not finding success early on in Asia, Gleeson decided to attempt to play golf in Australia. He was medalist at the qualifying school in 2001 and picked up his best finish of the year at the Australian PGA Championship, where he finished 9th.

Gleeson's breakthrough year was 2002, where he picked up his first professional win on the Asian Tour at the Volvo China Open, where he led from start to finish. But immediately after his first win, he had a dip in performance.

Gleeson said mainly that his poor form was due to him tinkering with his swing and changing equipment frequently. He had only one top-10 in 2003 and did not record a top-10 in 2004 or 2005. He recorded two top-10s in 2006 with a runner-up finish. His 2007 season included three top-10s and he got his full playing status back.

The second Asian Tour win for Gleeson came in 2008 at the Macau Open. He finished 2008 as his most successful season on the Asian Tour, earning almost $500,000 and a 5th-place finish on the Order of Merit. Gleeson credits his return to form to fatherhood, saying he has less time now to tinker with his swing.

== Amateur wins ==
- 1996 Australian Amateur
- 1998 New South Wales Medal (tied with Mark Thomson and Graydon Woolridge)

== Professional wins (4) ==
=== Asian Tour wins (3) ===
No.	Date	Tournament	Winning score	Margin of victory	Runner-up
1	15 Sep 2002	Volvo China Open	−16 (65-67-69-71=272)	6 strokes	(Australia) Brad Kennedy
2	26 Oct 2008	Macau Open	−18 (64-64-69-69=266)	3 strokes	(Taiwan) Lin Wen-tang
3	16 Oct 2011	Hero Indian Open	−20 (68-66-66-68=268)	3 strokes	(India) Chiragh Kumar

Asian Tour playoff record (0–2)

No.	Year	Tournament	Opponent(s)	Result
1	2009	Brunei Open	(Taiwan) Wang Ter-chang	Lost to par on second extra hole
2	2019	Sabah Masters	(Thailand) Phachara Khongwatmai, (India) Aman Raj, (Thailand) Pavit Tangkamolprasert	Tangkamolprasert won with birdie on second extra hole Raj eliminated by par on first hole

=== PGT Asia wins (1) ===
No.	Date	Tournament	Winning score	Margin of victory	Runner-up
1	20 Apr 2018	ICTSI Luisita Championship	−11 (69-71-65-72=277)	Playoff	(Philippines) Erwin Arcillas

== Results in major championships ==
Tournament	2007
The Open Championship	CUT

CUT = missed the halfway cut
Note: Gleeson only played in The Open Championship.

== Results in World Golf Championships ==
Tournament	2011
Match Play	
Championship	
Invitational	
Champions	71

Did not play

== Team appearances ==
Amateur

- Eisenhower Trophy (representing Australia): 1996 (winners)
- Nomura Cup (representing Australia): 1997
- Australian Men's Interstate Teams Matches (representing Queensland): 1995, 1996, 1997, 1998
