= Angelo Que =

Filipino professional golfer

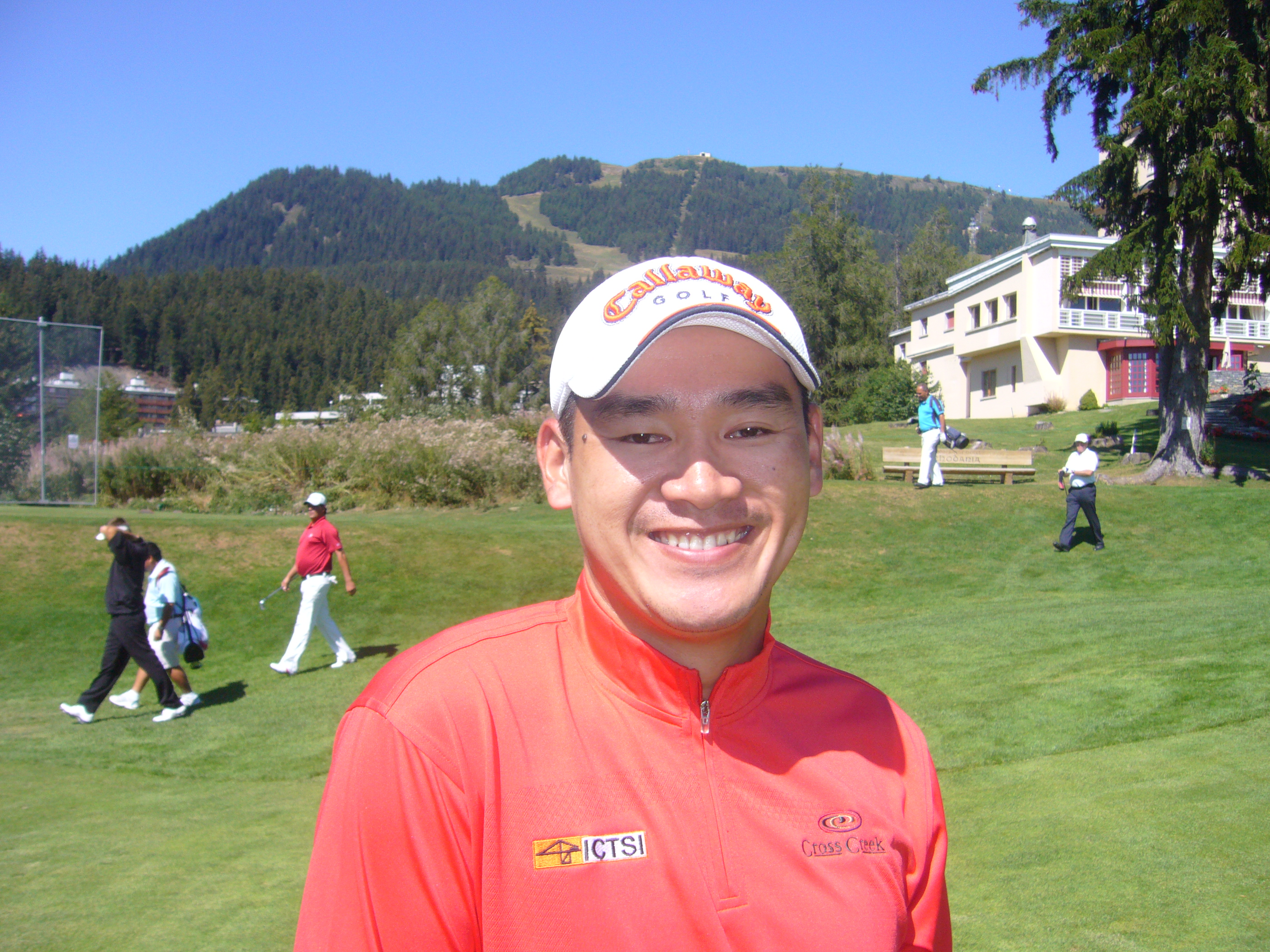
- Que at the 2009 Omega European Masters

Personal information
- Nationality: Philippines
- Born: 3 December 1978 (age 47) Manila, Philippines
- Height: 1.75 m (5 ft 9 in)

Career
- Sport: Golf
- Turned professional: 2003
- Current tours: Japan Golf Tour; Asian Tour; Philippine Golf Tour
- Former tour: ASEAN PGA Tour
- Professional wins: 21

Number of wins by tour
- Japan Golf Tour: 1
- Asian Tour: 3
- Other: 16

Best results in major championships
- Masters Tournament: DNP
- PGA Championship: DNP
- U.S. Open: CUT: 2009
- The Open Championship: CUT: 2008

Achievements and awards
- ASEAN PGA Tour Order of Merit winner: 2008
- Philippine Golf Tour Order of Merit winner: 2025
Medal record
Asian Games
Silver medal – second place	1998 Bangkok	Men's team

Angelo Que (born 3 December 1978) is a Filipino professional golfer.

== Career ==
Que won the Philippine Amateur twice before turning professional in 2003. He has played on the Asian Tour since 2003 and has won thrice: the 2004 Carlsberg Masters Vietnam, the 2008 Philippine Open and the 2010 Worldwide Holdings Selangor Masters.

== Amateur wins ==
- 2001 Philippine Amateur Championship
- 2002 Philippine Amateur Championship

== Professional wins (21) ==
=== Japan Golf Tour wins (1) ===
No.	Date	Tournament	Winning score	Margin of victory	Runners-up
1	30 Sep 2018	Top Cup Tokai Classic	−17 (68-69-68-66=271)	2 strokes	(Australia) Won Joon Lee, (South Korea) Yang Yong-eun

Japan Golf Tour playoff record (0–1)

No.	Year	Tournament	Opponent	Result
1	2015	ISPS Handa Global Cup	(Japan) Toshinori Muto	Lost to birdie on first extra hole

=== Asian Tour wins (3) ===
No.	Date	Tournament	Winning score	Margin of victory	Runner-up
1	7 Nov 2004	Carlsberg Masters Vietnam	−12 (70-66-70-70=276)	2 strokes	(Thailand) Thongchai Jaidee
2	6 Apr 2008	Philippine Open	−5 (73-71-66-73=283)	1 stroke	(Malaysia) Danny Chia
3	7 Aug 2010	Worldwide Holdings Selangor Masters	−6 (70-70-68-70=278)	Playoff	(England) Chris Rodgers

Asian Tour playoff record (1–1)

No.	Year	Tournament	Opponent	Result
1	2010	Worldwide Holdings Selangor Masters	(England) Chris Rodgers	Won with par on first extra hole
2	2014	Hong Kong Open	(Australia) Scott Hend	Lost to par on first extra hole

=== ASEAN PGA Tour wins (3) ===
No.	Date	Tournament	Winning score	Margin of victory	Runner(s)-up
1	10 Nov 2007	Laguna National ASEAN Championship	−20 (65-66-68-69=268)	1 stroke	(Malaysia) Danny Chia, (Singapore) Quincy Quek (a)
2	5 Jul 2008	ICTSI Mount Malarayat Championship	−20 (70-67-66-65=268)	3 strokes	(Thailand) Wisut Artjanawat
3	23 May 2009	ICTSI Mount Malarayat Championship (2)	−12 (66-68-72-70=276)	1 stroke	(Thailand) Namchok Tantipokhakul

=== Philippine Golf Tour wins (13) ===
No.	Date	Tournament	Winning score	Margin of victory	Runner(s)-up
1	31 Jan 2010	TCC Invitational	−1 (68-68-71-72=279)	5 strokes	(Philippines) Juvic Pagunsan
2	30 Jan 2011	TCC Invitational (2)	+6 (71-72-72-71=286)	1 stroke	(Philippines) Marvin Dumandan
3	7 Apr 2011	ICTSI Classic	−7 (72-68-69=209)	3 strokes	(Philippines) Orlan Sumcad
4	25 May 2013	ICTSI Orchard Championship	−20 (69-70-67-62=268)	4 strokes	(Philippines) Antonio Lascuña
5	28 Mar 2015	ICTSI Manila Masters	−7 (72-71-66-72=281)	2 strokes	(Philippines) Ferdie Aunzo, (Philippines) Miguel Tabuena
6	16 May 2015	ICTSI Anvaya Cove Invitational	−9 (74-67-74-64=279)	3 strokes	(Philippines) Antonio Lascuña
7	18 Feb 2017	ICTSI Anvaya Cove Invitational (2)	−15 (70-69-66-68=273)	9 strokes	(Japan) Toru Nakajima
8	22 Jul 2017	ICTSI Mount Malarayat Classic	−21 (65-68-66-68=267)	12 strokes	(Philippines) James Ryan Lam
9	25 May 2024	ICTSI Villamor Philippine Masters	−10 (73-68-70-67=278)	4 strokes	(South Korea) Rho Hyun-ho
10	27 Feb 2025	ICTSI Pradera Verde Championship	−10 (68-71-71-68=278)	6 strokes	(Philippines) Carl Jano Corpus
11	13 Mar 2025	ICTSI Eagle Ridge Championship	+5 (77-74-72-70=293)	2 strokes	(Netherlands) Guido van der Valk
12	24 May 2026	ICTSI Caliraya Springs Championship	−18 (66-70-68-66=270)	1 stroke	(Philippines) Antonio Lascuña
13	11 Sep 2026	ICTSI Summit Point Championship	−20 (66-66-66-70=268)	2 strokes	(Philippines) Aidric Chan

=== PGT Asia wins (1) ===
No.	Date	Tournament	Winning score	Margin of victory	Runner-up
1	12 Jul 2019	ICTSI Manila Southwoods Championship	−22 (65-67-65-65=262)	5 strokes	(Australia) Tim Stewart

== Playoff record ==
European Tour playoff record (0–1)

No.	Year	Tournament	Opponent	Result
1	2014	Hong Kong Open	(Australia) Scott Hend	Lost to par on first extra hole

== Results in major championships ==
Tournament	2008	2009
U.S. Open		CUT
The Open Championship	CUT	

Note: Que never played in the Masters Tournament or the PGA Championship.

Did not play

CUT = missed the half-way cut

== Team appearances ==
Amateur

- Eisenhower Trophy (representing the Philippines): 1998, 2002
- Bonallack Trophy (representing Asia/Pacific): 2000

Professional

- Dynasty Cup (representing Asia): 2005 (winners)
- World Cup (representing the Philippines): 2008, 2009, 2013, 2016
