= Miguel Tabuena =

Filipino professional golfer (born 1994)

Personal information
- Full name: Miguel Luis Lopez Tabuena
- Nationality: Philippines
- Born: October 13, 1994 (age 32)
- Height: 5 ft 6 in (1.68 m)
- Weight: 145 lb (66 kg; 10.4 st)

Career
- Sport: Golf
- Turned professional: 2011
- Current tours: LIV Golf; Asian Tour; Philippine Golf Tour
- Professional wins: 21

Number of wins by tour
- Asian Tour: 4
- Other: 17

Best results in major championships
- Masters Tournament: DNP
- PGA Championship: DNP
- U.S. Open: CUT: 2016
- The Open Championship: DNP

Achievements and awards
- Philippine Golf Tour Order of Merit winner: 2015
- PGT Asia Order of Merit winner: 2017
- OneAsia Tour Order of Merit winner: 2018
Medal record
Asian Games
Silver medal – second place	2010 Guangzhou	Individual

Miguel Luis Lopez Tabuena (born October 13, 1994) is a Filipino professional golfer. He plays on the Asian Tour where he has won four times.

== Early life and education ==
Miguel Tabuena was born on October 13, 1994, to a golfers Luigi Tabuena and Lorna Lopez and recounts growing up watching videotapes of plays of Tiger Woods. His father is a Christian minister. Miguel took up golf at a young age, competing in his first tournament at five years old at the Alabang Country Club. He completed his high schooling through home schooling through Masters Academy.

== Amateur career ==
As an amateur golfer, Tabuena won the events in Malaysia and Singapore and won the silver medal at the 2010 Asian Games in the men's individual event. He competed at the 2016 Summer Olympics in Rio de Janeiro despite a right shoulder injury. He placed 53rd among 60 competitors in the men's individual .

== Professional career ==
Tabuena has played on the Asian Tour since 2011. He picked up his first win at the 2015 Philippine Open. In 2016 he was joint runner-up in the Maybank Championship Malaysia, an event co-sanctioned with the European Tour. His second Asian Tour win came at the 2018 Queen's Cup. Tabuena also plays on the Philippine Golf Tour, where he has 15 wins.

Tabuena won the Philippines tournament of the 2025 International Series season.

Tabuena joined 4Aces GC of LIV Golf for the 2026 season.

== Awards ==
In 2016, Tabuena was recognized as the Sportsman of the Year of the Philippine Sportswriters Association, sharing the award with Filipino boxing champions Donnie Nietes and Nonito Donaire.

== Personal life ==
Tabuena is married to Sandra with whom he have a daughter.

== Amateur wins ==
- 2010 Malaysian Junior Open, SICC JIGC

== Professional wins (21) ==
=== Asian Tour wins (4) ===
Legend
International Series (1)
Other Asian Tour (3)

No.	Date	Tournament	Winning score	Margin of victory	Runner(s)-up
1	20 Dec 2015	Philippine Open	−14 (67-69-66=202) (Note: Shortened to 54 holes due to weather.)	1 stroke	(Australia) Scott Barr
2	2 Dec 2018	Queen's Cup	−20 (65-63-66-66=260)	3 strokes	(United States) Johannes Veerman
3	19 Mar 2023	DGC Open	−12 (68-71-72-65=276)	1 stroke	(India) Rashid Khan
4	26 Oct 2025	International Series Philippines	−24 (69-65-65-65=264)	3 strokes	(Japan) Yosuke Asaji, (Japan) Kazuki Higa

Asian Tour playoff record (0–1)

No.	Year	Tournament	Opponent	Result
1	2014	Yeangder Tournament Players Championship	(Thailand) Prom Meesawat	Lost to par on second extra hole

=== OneAsia Tour wins (1) ===
No.	Date	Tournament	Winning score	Margin of victory	Runner-up
1	3 Mar 2018	Solaire Philippine Open^{1}	+1 (73-72-73-71=289)	Playoff	(Thailand) Prom Meesawat

^{1}Co-sanctioned by the PGT Asia

OneAsia Tour playoff record (1–0)

No.	Year	Tournament	Opponent	Result
1	2018	Solaire Philippine Open	(Thailand) Prom Meesawat	Won after concession on first extra hole

=== Philippine Golf Tour wins (15) ===
No.	Date	Tournament	Winning score	Margin of victory	Runner(s)-up
1	30 Mar 2012	ICTSI Splendido Classic	−7 (72-71-66=209)	3 strokes	(Philippines) Ferdie Aunzo
2	8 Jun 2012	ICTSI Eastridge Classic	−8 (70-68-70=208)	3 strokes	(Philippines) Jay Bayron, (Philippines) Antonio Lascuña, (Philippines) Angelo Que, (Philippines) Elmer Salvador
3	23 Mar 2013	ICTSI Sherwood Hills Classic	−22 (71-69-70-66=266)	8 strokes	(Philippines) Edward Reyes
4	20 Jun 2014	ICTSI Manila Masters	−10 (66-74-64-74=278)	3 strokes	(Philippines) Elmer Salvador
5	21 Mar 2015	ICTSI Splendido Classic (2)	−13 (70-69-65-71=275)	1 stroke	(Philippines) Angelo Que
6	4 Jul 2015	ICTSI Rancho Palos Verdes Classic	−23 (66-66-64-69=265)	1 stroke	(Philippines) Elmer Salvador
7	12 Sep 2015	ICTSI Open Championship	−1 (74-69-73-71=287)	4 strokes	(Philippines) Antonio Lascuña, (Philippines) Angelo Que
8	19 Sep 2015	Central Azucarera de Tarlac Open	−22 (67-68-64-67=266)	9 strokes	(Philippines) Jhonnel Ababa
9	13 Feb 2016	ICTSI Anvaya Cove Invitational	−9 (62-70-77-70=279)	3 strokes	(Philippines) Clyde Mondilla
10	5 Feb 2017	TCC Invitational	+13 (75-74-80-72=301)	1 stroke	(Philippines) Juvic Pagunsan
11	6 May 2017	ICTSI Luisita Championship	−11 (73-69-69-66=277)	Playoff	(South Africa) Mathiam Keyser
12	12 Mar 2021	ICTSI Eagle Ridge Challenge	−6 (73-71-70-68=282)	2 strokes	(Philippines) Zanieboy Gialon
13	25 Mar 2022	ICTSI Luisita Championship (2)	−9 (69-71-69-70=279)	Playoff	(Philippines) Clyde Mondilla
14	12 May 2023	ICTSI Luisita Championship (3)	−14 (72-68-69-65=274)	2 strokes	(Philippines) Ira Alido
15	24 Nov 2023	ICTSI The Country Club Match Play Invitational	4 and 3		(Philippines) Antonio Lascuña

=== PGT Asia wins (2) ===
No.	Date	Tournament	Winning score	Margin of victory	Runner-up
1	18 Aug 2017	Aboitiz Invitational	−23 (65-64-71-65=265)	1 stroke	(Philippines) Angelo Que
2	3 Mar 2018 (2017 season)	Solaire Philippine Open^{1}	+1 (73-72-73-71=289)	Playoff	(Thailand) Prom Meesawat

^{1}Co-sanctioned by the OneAsia Tour

== Results in major championships ==
Tournament	2016
U.S. Open	CUT

CUT = missed the halfway cut
Note: Tabuena only played in the U.S. Open.

== Results in World Golf Championships ==
Tournament	2016
Championship	
Match Play	
Invitational	
Champions	T68

Did not play

"T" = Tied

== Team appearances ==
Professional

- World Cup (representing the Philippines): 2016
