= Philippine Golf Tour =

Professional golf tour

- Current season, competition or edition: 2026 Philippine Golf Tour
- Sport: Golf
- Founded: 2009
- First season: 2009
- Country: Based in the Philippines
- Most titles: Order of Merit titles: (Philippines) Antonio Lascuña (5); Tournament wins: (Philippines) Antonio Lascuña (26)
- Website: https://pgt.ph/

The Philippine Golf Tour, currently titled as the ICTSI Philippine Golf Tour for sponsorship reasons, is the main professional golf tour in the Philippines.

== History ==
The tour was founded in 2009 and was created in order to further advance professional golf in the Philippines. Many players from the Philippine Golf Tour have progressed through the tour, eventually playing and winning on the Asian Tour. Notable players include Antonio Lascuña, Juvic Pagunsan, Angelo Que and Miguel Tabuena. Korean-born Tom Kim, a multiple PGA Tour winner, also started his career on the Philippine Golf Tour.

Since its inauguration, the tour has been title sponsored by Manila-based global port management company International Container Terminal Services (ICTSI). They have also title sponsored the majority of tournaments played on the tour.

== Order of Merit winners ==
Year	Winner	Prize money (₱)
2025	(Philippines) Angelo Que	1,581,116
2024	(Philippines) Antonio Lascuña (5)	1,449,729
2023	(Philippines) Jhonnel Ababa	1,499,825
2022	No Order of Merit awarded	
2021	No Order of Merit awarded	
2020	No Order of Merit awarded	
2019	(Philippines) Juvic Pagunsan (2)	2,070,000
2018	(Philippines) Jobim Carlos	2,487,083
2017	(Philippines) Clyde Mondilla	3,156,409
2016	(Philippines) Antonio Lascuña (4)	3,695,949
2015	(Philippines) Miguel Tabuena	3,051,918
2014	(Philippines) Antonio Lascuña (3)	3,181,565
2013	(Philippines) Antonio Lascuña (2)	1,682,332
2012	(Philippines) Antonio Lascuña	2,247,640
2011	(Philippines) Juvic Pagunsan	1,474,604
2010	(Philippines) Jay Bayron	1,030,817
2009	(Philippines) Elmer Salvador	784,562

== PGT Asia ==
In August 2017, the Philippine Golf Tour launched a new circuit labelled as the PGT Asia, aimed at offering Asian players more playing opportunities in the region. The circuit ran until 2019.

=== PGT Asia Order of Merit winners ===
Year	Winner	Prize money (US$)
2019	(Philippines) Antonio Lascuña	46,075
2018	(Philippines) Clyde Mondilla	102,790
2017	(Philippines) Miguel Tabuena	125,500
