= Antonio Lascuña =

Filipino professional golfer

Personal information
- Nickname: Tony
- Nationality: Philippines
- Born: 26 December 1970 (age 55)

Career
- Sport: Golf
- Turned professional: 1997
- Current tours: Asian Tour; Philippine Golf Tour
- Former tours: Asian Development Tour; ASEAN PGA Tour
- Professional wins: 30

Achievements and awards
- Philippine Golf Tour Order of Merit winner: 2012, 2013, 2014, 2016, 2024
- PGT Asia Order of Merit winner: 2019

Antonio "Tony" Lascuña (born 26 December 1970) is a Filipino professional golfer. He has played on the Asian Tour and predominantly on the Philippine Golf Tour, where he was won 25 tournaments and four Order of Merit titles, making him the most successful player in the tour's history.

== Career ==
In 1997, Lascuña turned professional. After great success in his home country he joined the Asian Tour in 2007. Since then he has retained his card comfortably every season, with runner-up finishes in the 2007 Iskandar Johor Open and the 2012 Mercuries Taiwan Masters. His best season to date has been 2012, when he finished 12th on the Order of Merit.

Lascuña also represented his country in the 2007 World Cup, alongside Gerald Rosales.

== Amateur wins ==
- 1992 Canlubang Open
- 1993 Philippine Amateur
- 1994 DHL Amateur Open
- 1996 Putra Cup

== Professional wins (30) ==
=== Asian Development Tour wins (1) ===
No.	Date	Tournament	Winning score	Margin of victory	Runner-up
1	30 Aug 2014	Aboitiz Invitational^{1}	−20 (66-69-67-66=268)	3 strokes	(Philippines) Angelo Que

^{1}Co-sanctioned by the Philippine Golf Tour

=== ASEAN PGA Tour wins (1) ===
No.	Date	Tournament	Winning score	Margin of victory	Runner-up
1	11 Jan 2013 (2012 season)	Sabah Masters	−11 (67-69-71-66=273)	Playoff	(Singapore) Mardan Mamat

=== Philippine Golf Tour wins (26) ===
No.	Date	Tournament	Winning score	Margin of victory	Runner(s)-up
1	25 May 2012	ICTSI Eagle Ridge Invitational	−7 (70-73-66=209)	6 strokes	(Philippines) Jay Bayron, (Philippines) Jun Bernis
2	30 Jun 2012	ICTSI Manila Southwoods Championship	−14 (69-68-70-67=274)	2 strokes	(Philippines) Angelo Que
3	22 Dec 2012	ICTSI Wack Wack Championship	−8 (70-67-71-72=280)	9 strokes	(Philippines) Elmer Salvador
4	10 May 2013	ICTSI Calatagan Challenge	−9 (67-71-69=207)	4 strokes	(Philippines) Jhonnel Ababa
5	7 Sep 2013	ICTSI Manila Southwoods Championship (2)	−21 (64-68-67-68=267)	3 strokes	(Philippines) Jhonnel Ababa, (Philippines) Miguel Tabuena
6	12 Apr 2014	ICTSI Eagle Ridge Invitational (2)	−7 (71-69-70-71=281)	1 stroke	(Philippines) Marvin Dumandan
7	10 May 2014	ICTSI Valley Challenge	−16 (69-67-67-69=272)	7 strokes	(Philippines) Jhonnel Ababa
8	26 Jul 2014	ICTSI Negros Occidental Classic	−12 (68-66-67-67=268)	4 strokes	(Philippines) Lloyd Jefferson Go (a), (Philippines) Elmer Salvador
9	30 Aug 2014	Aboitiz Invitational^{1}	−20 (66-69-67-66=268)	3 strokes	(Philippines) Angelo Que
10	6 Sep 2014	ICTSI Pilipinas Invitational	−19 (65-69-68-67=269)	4 strokes	(Philippines) Miguel Tabuena
11	11 Jul 2015	ICTSI Apo Invitational	−8 (69-73-69-69=280)	1 stroke	(Philippines) Miguel Tabuena
12	1 Aug 2015	ICTSI Classic	−15 (69-70-68-66=273)	6 strokes	(Philippines) Jay Bayron, (Philippines) Clyde Mondilla, (Philippines) Robert Pactolerin
13	2 Apr 2016	ICTSI Luisita Championship	−16 (70-66-71-65=272)	4 strokes	(South Korea) Park Jun-hyeok
14	3 Jun 2016	ICTSI Eagle Ridge Invitational (3)	−15 (66-70-69-68=273)	1 stroke	(Japan) Ryoma Miki
15	25 Jun 2016	ICTSI Forest Hills Championship	−16 (65-64-72-67=268)	11 strokes	(Philippines) Zanieboy Gialon, (Philippines) Orlan Sumcad
16	9 Jul 2016	ICTSI Bacolod Challenge	−10 (70-66-69-65=270)	Playoff	(United States) Micah Lauren Shin, (Netherlands) Guido van der Valk
17	24 Sep 2016	ICTSI Tournament Players Championship	−8 (71-67-72-70=280)	Playoff	(Philippines) Elmer Salvador
18	8 Apr 2017	ICTSI Manila Masters	−3 (69-70-76-70=285)	1 stroke	(Philippines) Jay Bayron
19	24 Jun 2017	ICTSI Forest Hills Championship (2)	−11 (68-67-68-70=273)	3 strokes	(Philippines) Zanieboy Gialon
20	5 Oct 2019	ICTSI Apo Invitational (2)	−13 (65-68-73-69=275)	3 strokes	(Philippines) Keanu Jahns
21	12 Oct 2019	ICTSI South Pacific Classic	−12 (72-70-68-66=276)	3 strokes	(Philippines) Ira Alido
22	20 Nov 2020	ICTSI Riviera Invitational Challenge	−8 (71-72-69-68=280)	4 strokes	(Philippines) Ira Alido, (Philippines) Rupert Zaragosa
23	18 Nov 2022	ICTSI Villamor Match Play Invitational	4 and 3		(Philippines) Keanu Jahns
24	21 Apr 2023	ICTSI Caliraya Springs Championship	−18 (68-66-67-69=270)	3 strokes	(Philippines) Lloyd Jefferson Go, (Philippines) Angelo Que
25	26 Jan 2024	TCC Invitational	+3 (70-74-72-75=291)	3 strokes	(Philippines) Miguel Tabuena
26	19 Jul 2024	ICTSI Splendido Taal Championship	−13 (69-68-67-71=275)	1 stroke	(Philippines) Keanu Jahns

^{1}Co-sanctioned by the Asian Development Tour

=== PGT Asia wins (2) ===
No.	Date	Tournament	Winning score	Margin of victory	Runner-up
1	18 Nov 2017	ICTSI Wack Wack Championship	−2 (71-72-73-70=286)	2 strokes	(United States) Nicolas Paez
2	29 Sep 2019	Nan Pao Open^{1}	−17 (69-64-68-70=271)	1 stroke	(Taiwan) Liu Yu-jui

^{1}Co-sanctioned by the Taiwan PGA Tour

=== Other wins (1) ===
- 2007 Petaling Jaya Classic

== Playoff record ==
Asian Tour playoff record (0–1)

No.	Year	Tournament	Opponent	Result
1	2014	Worldwide Holdings Selangor Masters	(Thailand) Chapchai Nirat	Lost to par on first extra hole

== Results in World Golf Championships ==
Tournament	2014
Match Play	
Championship	
Invitational	
Champions	T69

Did not play

"T" = Tied

== Team appearances ==
Amateur

- Eisenhower Trophy (representing the Philippines): 1996

Professional

- World Cup (representing the Philippines): 2007, 2013
