= Kiradech Aphibarnrat =

Thai professional golfer (born 1989)

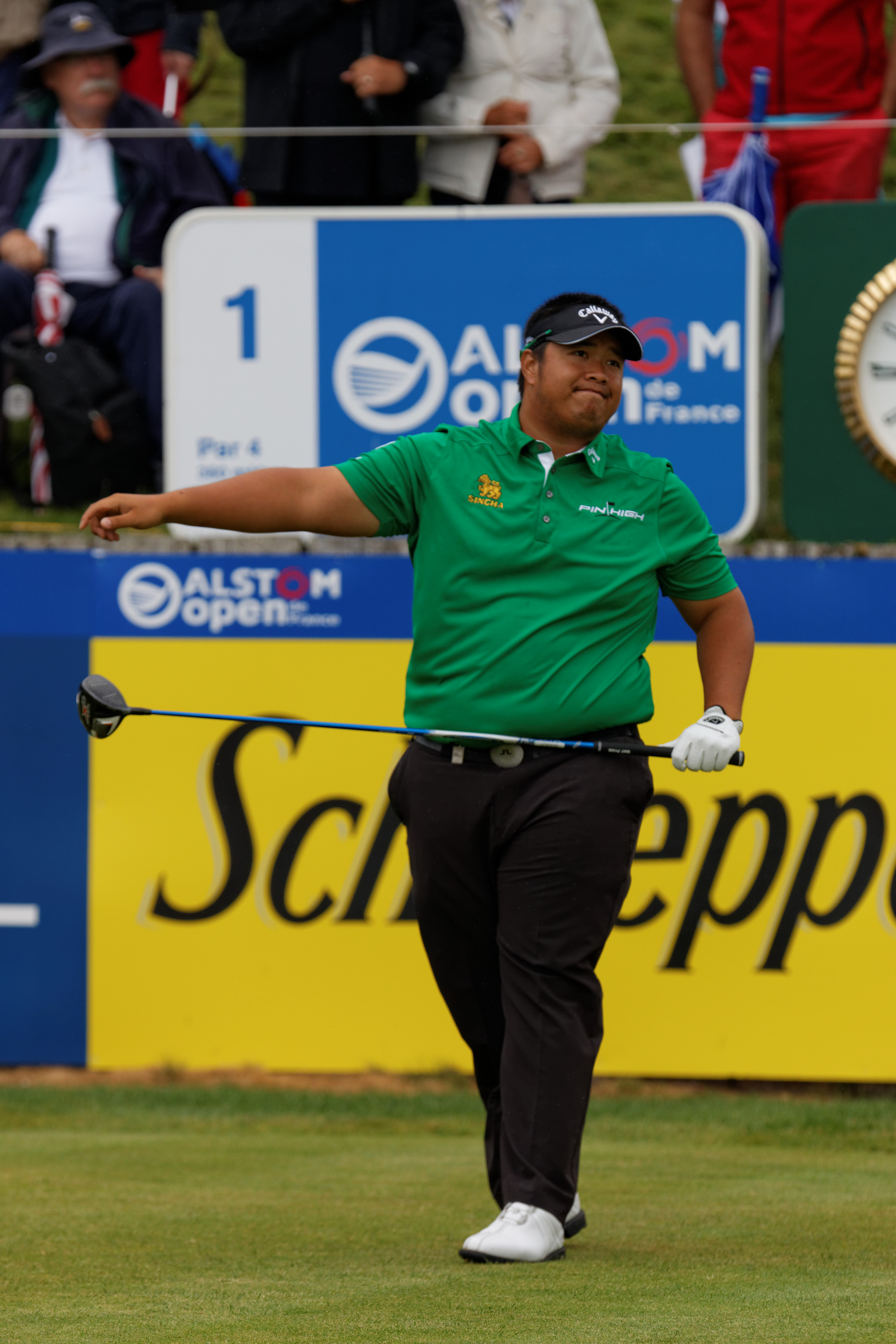
- Aphibarnrat in July 2014

Personal information
- Nationality: Thailand
- Born: 23 July 1989 (age 37) Bangkok, Thailand
- Height: 1.72 m (5 ft 8 in)
- Weight: 104 kg (229 lb)
- Spouse: Tunyatorn

Career
- Sport: Golf
- Turned professional: 2008
- Current tours: European Tour; Asian Tour
- Former tours: PGA Tour; Japan Golf Tour; All Thailand Golf Tour
- Professional wins: 12
- Highest ranking: 29 (25 March 2018) (as of 25 October 2026)

Number of wins by tour
- European Tour: 4
- Asian Tour: 3
- PGA Tour of Australasia: 1
- Other: 7

Best results in major championships
- Masters Tournament: T15: 2016
- PGA Championship: T25: 2013
- U.S. Open: 15th: 2018
- The Open Championship: T32: 2019

Achievements and awards
- All Thailand Golf Tour Order of Merit winner: 2012
- Asian Tour Order of Merit winner: 2013
- Asian Tour Players' Player of the Year: 2013
Medal record
Summer Universiade
Gold medal – first place	2007 Bangkok	Men's team
Southeast Asian Games
Silver medal – second place	2007 Nakhon Ratchasima	Individual
Gold medal – first place	2007 Nakhon Ratchasima	Men's team

Kiradech Aphibarnrat (Thai: กิรเดช อภิบาลรัตน์; born Anujit Hirunratanakorn, 23 July 1989) is a Thai professional golfer who plays on the Asian and European tours.

== Amateur career ==
In both 2003 and 2004, Aphibarnrat won his age group at the Junior World Golf Championships. In 2007, he was on the gold medal team at the 2007 Summer Universiade and took a silver in the individual event at the 2007 Southeast Asian Games.

== Professional career ==
Aphibarnrat turned professional in 2008 and began playing on the Asian Tour and the Japan Golf Tour in 2009. His first professional victory came in 2009 at the Mercedes-Benz Tour's Singha Pattaya Open, which he won by 11 strokes, earning US$50,000. Aphibarnrat's first Asian Tour win was at the 2011 SAIL Open.

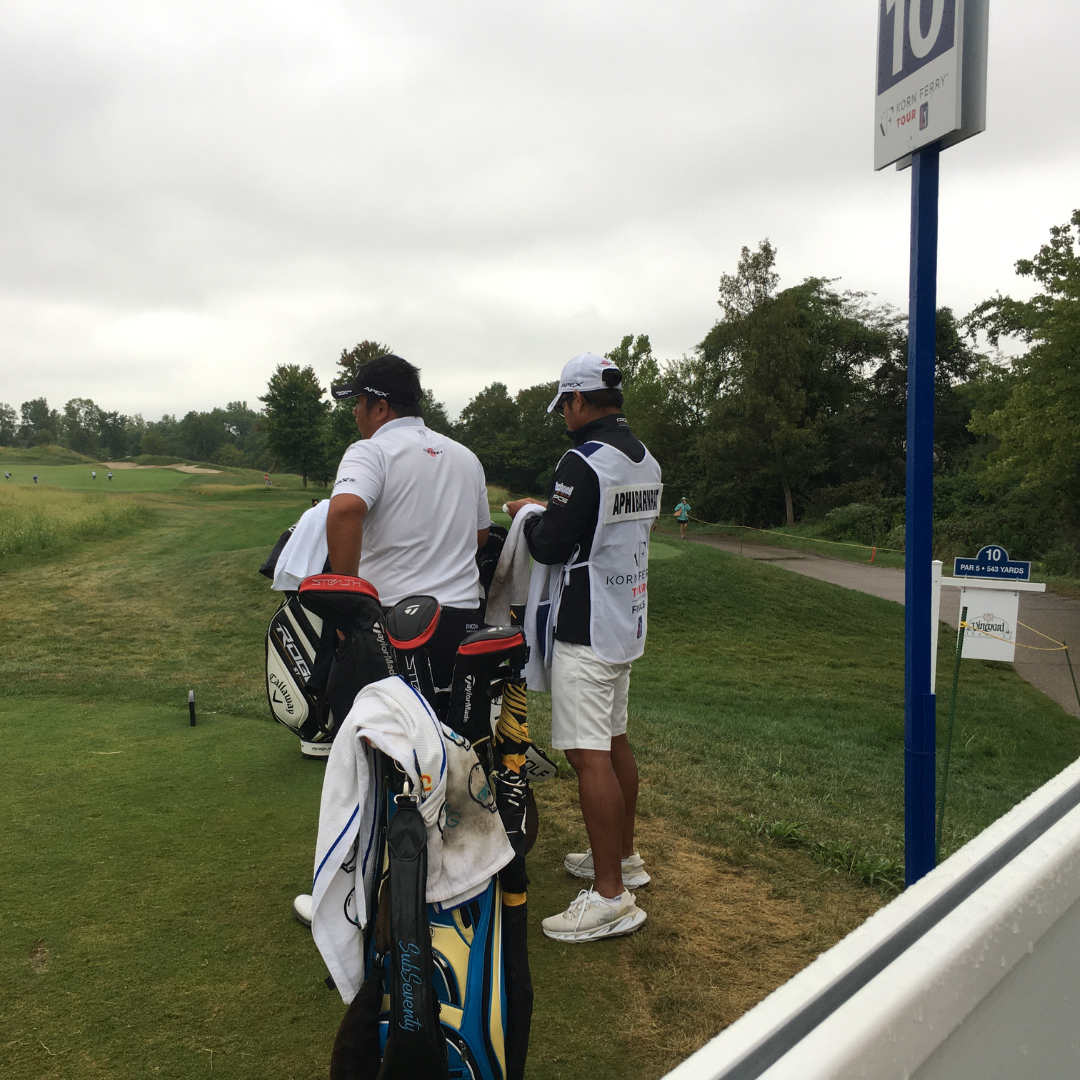
Aphibarnrat at the Korn Ferry Tour Championship in Newburgh, Indiana

Aphibarnrat's first victory on the European Tour was at the Maybank Malaysian Open in March 2013. The event was co-sanctioned by the Asian Tour, thus giving him a second win on that tour. In the event, which shortened to 54 holes due to thunderstorms, Aphibarnrat defeated Edoardo Molinari by one stroke.

He won his second European Tour title at the Shenzhen International in a sudden death playoff over Li Haotong. Having led the tournament at the 54 hole stage, he trailed late in the back nine, but eagled the 17th hole and then missed a birdie putt on the 18th for the outright victory. He would go on to birdie the first extra hole to claim victory. Aphibarnrat became only the second player from Thailand, after Thongchai Jaidee, to record multiple European Tour wins.

In 2018, Aphibarnrat gained membership status on the PGA Tour for the 2018–19 season. He became the first PGA Tour member from Thailand.

In September 2021, Aphibarnrat shot rounds of 64–68 to hold the 36-hole lead at the BMW PGA Championship. A third round 74 saw him fall out of contention. He responded with a final-round 64 on Sunday to eventually finish in a tie for second place, one shot behind Billy Horschel.

Aphibarnrat is sometimes referred to as "Asia's John Daly", a comparison of his "unathletic" physique to the similarly large body type of two-time major championship winner John Daly.

== Amateur wins ==
- 2003 Junior World Golf Championships (Boys 13–14)
- 2004 Junior World Golf Championships (Boys 13–14)

== Professional wins (12) ==
=== European Tour wins (4) ===
No.	Date	Tournament	Winning score	Margin of victory	Runner-up
1	24 Mar 2013	Maybank Malaysian Open^{1}	−13 (65-68-70=203) (Note: Shortened to 54 holes due to weather.)	1 stroke	(Italy) Edoardo Molinari
2	19 Apr 2015	Shenzhen International	−12 (67-69-68-72=276)	Playoff	(China) Li Haotong
3	2 Aug 2015	Saltire Energy Paul Lawrie Match Play	1 up		(Sweden) Robert Karlsson
4	11 Feb 2018	ISPS Handa World Super 6 Perth^{1,2}	2 and 1		(Australia) James Nitties

^{1}Co-sanctioned by the Asian Tour
^{2}Co-sanctioned by the PGA Tour of Australasia

European Tour playoff record (1–1)

No.	Year	Tournament	Opponent	Result
1	2015	Shenzhen International	(China) Li Haotong	Won with birdie on first extra hole
2	2024	Porsche Singapore Classic	(Sweden) Jesper Svensson	Lost to par on third extra hole

=== Asian Tour wins (3) ===
No.	Date	Tournament	Winning score	Margin of victory	Runner-up
1	25 Mar 2011	SAIL Open	−16 (68-67-69-68=272)	1 stroke	(Bangladesh) Siddikur Rahman
2	24 Mar 2013	Maybank Malaysian Open^{1}	−13 (65-68-70=203)	1 stroke	(Italy) Edoardo Molinari
3	11 Feb 2018	ISPS Handa World Super 6 Perth^{1,2}	2 and 1		(Australia) James Nitties

^{1}Co-sanctioned by the European Tour
^{2}Co-sanctioned by the PGA Tour of Australasia

Asian Tour playoff record (0–1)

No.	Year	Tournament	Opponents	Result
1	2012	Zaykabar Myanmar Open	(Australia) Adam Blyth, (Australia) Kieran Pratt	Pratt won with birdie on second extra hole Aphibarnrat eliminated by birdie on first hole

=== Asian Development Tour wins (3) ===
No.	Date	Tournament	Winning score	Margin of victory	Runner-up
1	13 Sep 2015	Thongchai Jaidee Foundation^{1}	−24 (67-61-68-68=264)	3 strokes	(Thailand) Prayad Marksaeng
2	10 Dec 2017	Thongchai Jaidee Foundation^{1} (2)	−14 (65-71-68-70=274)	3 strokes	(England) William Harrold
3	10 Mar 2018	Richard Mille Brunei Championships	−23 (65-64-64-68=261)	6 strokes	(United States) John Catlin

^{1}Co-sanctioned by the All Thailand Golf Tour

=== All Thailand Golf Tour wins (6) ===
No.	Date	Tournament	Winning score	Margin of victory	Runner-up
1	5 Apr 2009	Singha Pattaya Open^{1}	−23 (68-65-61-67=261)	11 strokes	(Philippines) Antonio Lascuña
2	22 Jul 2012	Singha All Thailand Championship	−18 (64-66-69-67=266)	5 strokes	
3	3 Feb 2013 (2012 season)	Singha Masters	−25 (263)	2 strokes	(South Korea) Baek Seuk-hyun
4	13 Sep 2015	Thongchai Jaidee Foundation^{2}	−24 (67-61-68-68=264)	3 strokes	(Thailand) Prayad Marksaeng
5	10 Dec 2017	Thongchai Jaidee Foundation^{2} (2)	−14 (65-71-68-70=274)	3 strokes	(England) William Harrold
6	19 Dec 2021	Singha Thailand Masters	−19 (65-68-68-68=269)	1 stroke	(Thailand) Phachara Khongwatmai

^{1}Co-sanctioned by the ASEAN PGA Tour
^{2}Co-sanctioned by the Asian Development Tour

== Results in major championships ==
Tournament	2013	2014	2015	2016	2017	2018
Masters Tournament				T15		T44
U.S. Open				CUT		15
The Open Championship	CUT	CUT	CUT	CUT		T75
PGA Championship	T25	WD	T68	T66		CUT

Tournament	2019
Masters Tournament	T49
PGA Championship	T41
U.S. Open	CUT
The Open Championship	T32

Did not play

CUT = missed the half-way cut
WD = Withdrew
"T" = tied

=== Summary ===
Tournament	Wins	2nd	3rd	Top-5	Top-10	Top-25	Events	Cuts made
Masters Tournament	0	0	0	0	0	1	3	3
PGA Championship	0	0	0	0	0	1	6	4
U.S. Open	0	0	0	0	0	1	3	1
The Open Championship	0	0	0	0	0	0	6	2
Totals	0	0	0	0	0	3	18	10

- Most consecutive cuts made – 4 (2016 PGA – 2018 Open)
- Longest streak of top-10s – 0

== Results in The Players Championship ==
Tournament	2016	2017	2018	2019
The Players Championship	CUT		T30	CUT

Did not play

CUT = missed the halfway cut
"T" indicates a tie for a place

== Results in World Golf Championships ==
Results not in chronological order before 2015.

Tournament	2010	2011	2012	2013	2014	2015	2016	2017	2018	2019
Championship					67		T49		T5	T3
Match Play					R64		T18		QF	T40
Invitational				T40			53		T31	
Champions	74	T66		T55		T30		T24	T4	

Top 10
Did not play

QF, R16, R32, R64 = Round in which player lost in match play
"T" = Tied

== Team appearances ==
Amateur

- Bonallack Trophy (representing Asia/Pacific): 2006
- Southeast Asian Games (representing Thailand): 2007 (winners)

Professional

- World Cup (representing Thailand): 2011, 2013, 2016, 2018
- Royal Trophy (representing Asia): 2012 (winners), 2013
- EurAsia Cup (representing Asia): 2014, 2016, 2018
- Amata Friendship Cup (representing Thailand): 2018 (winners)

== See also ==
- 2021 Korn Ferry Tour Finals graduates
- 2022 European Tour Qualifying School graduates
- 2023 European Tour Qualifying School graduates
