= Jazz Janewattananond =

Thai professional golfer

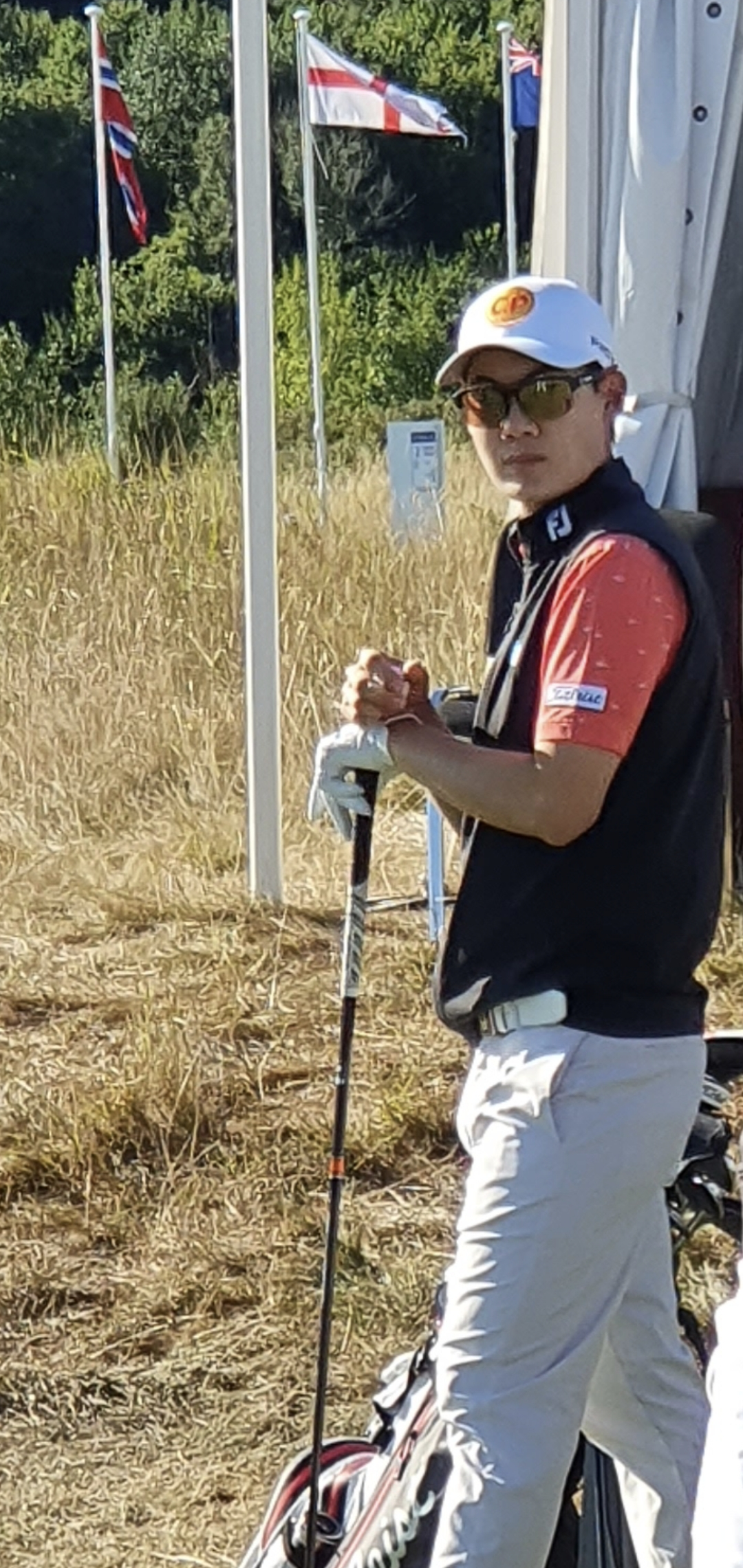
- Janewattananond at the 2022 Cazoo Open

Personal information
- Full name: Atiwit Janewattananond
- Nickname: Jazz
- Nationality: Thailand
- Born: 26 November 1995 (age 30) Bangkok, Thailand
- Height: 1.75 m (5 ft 9 in)
- Weight: 68 kg (150 lb)

Career
- Sport: Golf
- Turned professional: 2010
- Current tour: Asian Tour
- Former tours: European Tour; Japan Golf Tour; Korean Tour; All Thailand Golf Tour
- Professional wins: 11
- Highest ranking: 38 (12 January 2020) (as of 25 October 2026)

Number of wins by tour
- Japan Golf Tour: 1
- Asian Tour: 7 (Tied-9th all-time)
- Other: 5

Best results in major championships
- Masters Tournament: T51: 2020
- PGA Championship: T14: 2019
- U.S. Open: CUT: 2020
- The Open Championship: T46: 2021

Achievements and awards
- Japan Golf Tour Rookie of the Year: 2019
- Asian Tour Order of Merit winner: 2019
- Asian Tour Players' Player of the Year: 2019

Atiwit "Jazz" Janewattananond (Thai: อติวิชญ์ "แจ๊ส" เจนวัฒนานนท์; born 26 November 1995) is a Thai professional golfer who currently plays on the Asian Tour and formerly the European Tour.

== Early life ==
Janewattananond was born in Bangkok, Thailand. His nickname comes from his father, a fan of jazz music. At the age of 14 years and 71 days he became the youngest golfer to make the cut on the Asian Tour, which he achieved at the 2010 Asian Tour International in Nakhon Pathom.

Janewattananond took a brief sabbatical from golf at the end of the 2016 European Tour season to join the monkhood (less than 2 weeks at a monastery known for hosting celebs), to which he credited the subsequent upturn in his performances on the golf course.

== Professional career ==
In December 2010, Janewattananond turned professional. In September 2011 he played in his first Japan Golf Tour event, the 2011 Asia-Pacific Panasonic Open, where he made the cut and finished tied for 65th.

Janewattananond achieved his first career win on the Asian Tour in February 2017 at the Bashundhara Bangladesh Open. He won again during the 2018 season at the Queen's Cup in his home county, Thailand. He also qualified for the 2018 Open Championship, but failed to make the cut.

In January 2019, Janewattananond won the SMBC Singapore Open by two shots, a tournament co-sanctioned by the Japan Tour and the Asian Tour. This win brought him into the world top 100 and secured him a place in the 2019 Open Championship. His position in the world top 100 also gave him a place in the 2019 PGA Championship where he finished tied for 14th place. He had been tied for second place after three rounds but a final round 77 dropped him down the field. He won three more Asian Tour events in 2019, winning the Kolon Korea Open in June, the BNI Indonesian Masters and the Thailand Masters in December. His Indonesian Masters win lifted him into the world top-50 for the first time and earned him a place in the 2020 Masters Tournament.

Janewattananond recorded his best finish on the European Tour with a second-place finish at the Kenya Savannah Classic in March 2021. He was defeated in a playoff by Daniel van Tonder.

In November 2022, Janewattananond won the International Series Morocco on the Asian Tour. He shot a final-round 67 to claim his seventh Asian Tour title.

== Professional wins (11) ==
=== Japan Golf Tour wins (1) ===
No.	Date	Tournament	Winning score	Margin of victory	Runners-up
1	20 Jan 2019	SMBC Singapore Open^{1}	−18 (68-68-65-65=266)	2 strokes	(England) Paul Casey, (Japan) Yoshinori Fujimoto

^{1}Co-sanctioned by the Asian Tour

=== Asian Tour wins (7) ===
Legend
Flagship events (1)
International Series (1)
Other Asian Tour (5)

No.	Date	Tournament	Winning score	Margin of victory	Runner(s)-up
1	4 Feb 2017	Bashundhara Bangladesh Open	−17 (64-67-69-67=267)	4 strokes	(Bangladesh) Siddikur Rahman
2	1 Jul 2018	Queen's Cup	−19 (64-66-68-67=265)	4 strokes	(India) Gaganjeet Bhullar
3	20 Jan 2019	SMBC Singapore Open^{1}	−18 (68-68-65-65=266)	2 strokes	(England) Paul Casey, (Japan) Yoshinori Fujimoto
4	23 Jun 2019	Kolon Korea Open^{2}	−6 (70-67-69-72=278)	1 stroke	(South Korea) Hwang Inn-choon
5	15 Dec 2019	BNI Indonesian Masters	−23 (68-70-62-65=265)	5 strokes	(Thailand) Gunn Charoenkul
6	22 Dec 2019	Thailand Masters	−23 (69-67-60-65=261)	5 strokes	(Belgium) Thomas Detry, (Thailand) Phachara Khongwatmai, (Thailand) Suradit Yongcharoenchai
7	6 Nov 2022	International Series Morocco	−12 (71-70-72-67=280)	1 stroke	(Canada) Richard T. Lee

^{1}Co-sanctioned by the Japan Golf Tour
^{2}Co-sanctioned by the Korean Tour

=== Korean Tour wins (1) ===
No.	Date	Tournament	Winning score	Margin of victory	Runner-up
1	23 Jun 2019	Kolon Korea Open^{1}	−6 (70-67-69-72=278)	1 stroke	(South Korea) Hwang Inn-choon

^{1}Co-sanctioned by the Asian Tour

=== MENA Golf Tour wins (1) ===
No.	Date	Tournament	Winning score	Margin of victory	Runner-up
1	4 May 2017	Mahasamutr Masters	−6 (70-68-72=210)	Playoff	(Thailand) Varanyu Rattanaphaibulkij

=== All Thailand Golf Tour wins (3) ===
No.	Date	Tournament	Winning score	Margin of victory	Runner(s)-up
1	30 Jun 2013	Road to Panasonic Open Singha All Thailand Championship	−22 (64-69-70-63=266)	5 strokes	(Thailand) Gunn Charoenkul, (Thailand) Thanyakon Khrongpha
2	22 May 2016	Singha Classic	−11 (71-66-72-64=273)	1 stroke	(Thailand) Panuphol Pittayarat, (Thailand) Atthaphon Sribookaew
3	9 Jul 2017	Singha Classic (2)	−16 (68-66-73-61=268)	1 stroke	(Thailand) Panuphol Pittayarat

== Playoff record ==
European Tour playoff record (0–1)

No.	Year	Tournament	Opponent	Result
1	2021	Kenya Savannah Classic	(South Africa) Daniel van Tonder	Lost to birdie on third extra hole

== Results in major championships ==
Results not in chronological order before 2019 and in 2020.

Tournament	2018	2019	2020	2021	2022	2023
Masters Tournament			T51			
PGA Championship		T14	CUT	CUT		
U.S. Open			CUT			
The Open Championship	CUT	CUT	NT	T46		CUT

Did not play

CUT = missed the half-way cut
"T" indicates a tie for a place
NT = No tournament due to COVID-19 pandemic

== Results in World Golf Championships ==
Tournament	2019	2020
Championship		T53
Match Play		NT^{1}
Invitational		T59
Champions	T14	NT^{1}

^{1}Cancelled due to COVID-19 pandemic

Did not play

NT = No tournament
"T" = Tied

== Team appearances ==
Professional

- Amata Friendship Cup (representing Thailand): 2018 (winners)

== See also ==
- 2017 European Tour Qualifying School graduates
- List of golfers with most Asian Tour wins
