= Gunn Charoenkul =

Thai professional golfer

Personal information
- Nationality: Thailand
- Born: 10 April 1992 (age 34) Bangkok, Thailand
- Height: 181 cm (5 ft 11 in)
- Weight: 83 kg (183 lb)

Career
- Sport: Golf
- Turned professional: 2011
- Current tours: Japan Golf Tour; Asian Tour; All Thailand Golf Tour
- Former tours: China Tour; ASEAN PGA Tour
- Professional wins: 12

Best results in major championships
- Masters Tournament: DNP
- PGA Championship: DNP
- U.S. Open: CUT: 2023
- The Open Championship: CUT: 2019

Achievements and awards
- ASEAN PGA Tour Order of Merit winner: 2014, 2016

Gunn Charoenkul (Thai: กัญจน์ เจริญกุล; born 10 April 1992) is a Thai professional golfer who plays on both the Asian Tour and Japan Golf Tour.

== Professional career ==
Gunn was born in Bangkok, Thailand and turned professional in 2011. He won three tournaments on the All Thailand Golf Tour and played on the Asian Tour 2012–2014, where his best finish was T6 at the 2013 Solaire Open at the Wack Wack Golf and Country Club in the Philippines.

He played on the PGA Tour China 2015–2016, where he won two tournaments, the 2014 Yunnan Open and the 2016 Chongqing Jiangnan NewTown KingRun Open.

Back on the Asian Tour, he was runner-up at the 2016 Queen's Cup in his native Thailand and the 2019 BNI Indonesian Masters, and third at the 2020 Hong Kong Open behind Wade Ormsby and Shane Lowry.

In 2018, he joined the Japan Golf Tour, where he posted 10 top-10s in 2019. He qualified for the 2019 Open Championship by finishing T3 at the Mizuno Open, but missed the cut.

In early 2020, he reached a career high of 126th on the Official World Golf Ranking, and in 2021 he qualified for the 2020 Summer Olympics in Tokyo together with Jazz Janewattananond.

== Professional wins (12) ==
=== China Tour wins (3) ===
No.	Date	Tournament	Winning score	Margin of victory	Runner-up
1	10 Aug 2014	Yulongwan Yunnan Open	−21 (61-70-66-66=263)	3 strokes	(China) Zhang Xinjun
2	11 Sep 2016	Chongqing Jiangnan NewTown KingRun Open	−21 (65-68-68-66=267)	6 strokes	(Hong Kong) Hak Shunyat
3	17 Sep 2017	Beijing Classic	−16 (67-72-64-69=272)	1 stroke	(Australia) Deyen Lawson

=== All Thailand Golf Tour wins (4) ===
No.	Date	Tournament	Winning score	Margin of victory	Runner(s)-up
1	19 Aug 2012	Singha E-San Open^{1}	−14 (64-67-70-73=274)	Playoff	(Malaysia) Nicholas Fung
2	23 Mar 2014	Singha E-San Open^{1} (2)	−14 (68-71-69-66=274)	2 strokes	(England) Grant Jackson, (Thailand) Teerawat Poipong
3	20 Jul 2014	Singha Panasonic Hua Hin Open^{1}	−15 (69-66-70-68=273)	1 stroke	(Thailand) Chapchai Nirat
4	31 Jul 2022	Singha Championship	−10 (68-70-64-68=270)	1 stroke	(Thailand) Denwit Boriboonsub

^{1}Co-sanctioned by the ASEAN PGA Tour

=== ASEAN PGA Tour wins (5) ===
No.	Date	Tournament	Winning score	Margin of victory	Runner(s)-up
1	19 Aug 2012	Singha E-San Open^{1}	−14 (64-67-70-73=274)	Playoff	(Malaysia) Nicholas Fung
2	23 Mar 2014	Singha E-San Open^{1} (2)	−14 (68-71-69-66=274)	2 strokes	(England) Grant Jackson, (Thailand) Teerawat Poipong
3	31 May 2014	Melaka Championship^{2}	−7 (67-74-70-70=281)	3 strokes	(Malaysia) Iylia Jamil
4	20 Jul 2014	Singha Panasonic Hua Hin Open^{1}	−15 (69-66-70-68=273)	1 stroke	(Thailand) Chapchai Nirat
5	23 Jul 2016	Jimei Korea Kulim Championship^{2}	−20 (66-69-70-63=268)	4 strokes	(Malaysia) Ben Leong, (Thailand) Poom Saksansin

^{1}Co-sanctioned by the All Thailand Golf Tour
^{2}Co-sanctioned by the Professional Golf of Malaysia Tour

=== Philippine Golf Tour wins (1) ===
No.	Date	Tournament	Winning score	Margin of victory	Runner-up
1	13 May 2017	ICTSI Orchard Championship	−7 (75-68-67-71=281)	1 stroke	(Philippines) Clyde Mondilla

=== Thailand PGA Tour wins (2) ===
No.	Date	Tournament	Winning score	Margin of victory	Runner-up
1	19 Jul 2020	Singha-SAT Hua Hin Championship	−19 (68-62-64=194)	6 strokes	(Thailand) Prom Meesawat
2	2 Aug 2020	Singha-SAT Nakhon Nayok Classic	−12 (67-64-70=201)	Playoff	(Thailand) Nirun Sae-ueng

== Results in major championships ==
Tournament	2019	2020	2021	2022	2023
Masters Tournament					
PGA Championship					
U.S. Open					CUT
The Open Championship	CUT	NT			

Did not play

CUT = missed the halfway cut
NT = No tournament due to the COVID-19 pandemic
