= 2013 All Thailand Golf Tour =

Golf tour season

2013 All Thailand Golf Tour season
- Duration: 14 February 2013 – 3 February 2014
- Number of official events: 10
- Most wins: (Thailand) Prayad Marksaeng (2) (Thailand) Kanphanitnan Muangkhumsakul (2) (Thailand) Tanaporn Kongkiatkrai (2)
- Order of Merit (men): (Thailand) Prayad Marksaeng

The 2013 All Thailand Golf Tour, titled as the 2013 Singha All Thailand Golf Tour for sponsorship reasons, was the 15th season of the All Thailand Golf Tour (formerly the TPC Tour), one of the main professional golf tours in Thailand since it was formed in 1999.

== Schedule ==
The following tables list official events during the 2013 season.

=== Men's events ===
Date	Tournament	Location	Purse (฿)	Winner (Note: The number in brackets after each winner's name is the number of All Thailand Golf Tour events they had won up to and including that tournament.)	Other tours (Note: ASEAN − ASEAN PGA Tour.)
17 Feb	Singha E-San Open	Khon Kaen	3,000,000	(Thailand) Prayad Marksaeng (10)	ASEAN
21 Apr	Singha Pattaya Open	Chonburi	3,000,000	(Thailand) Kwanchai Tannin (1)	ASEAN
12 May	Road To Panasonic Open Singha Bangkok Open	Chachoengsao	2,000,000	(Thailand) Prayad Marksaeng (11)	
26 May	Road To Panasonic Open Singha Championship	Lopbori	2,000,000	(South Korea) Baek Seuk-hyun (1)	
30 Jun	Road to Panasonic Open Singha All Thailand Championship	Chonburi	3,000,000	(Thailand) Jazz Janewattananond (1)	
21 Jul	Singha Hua Hin Open	Prachuap Khiri Khan	2,000,000	(Thailand) Phachara Khongwatmai (a) (1)	ASEAN
11 Aug	Singha Chiang Mai Open	Chiang Mai	2,000,000	(Thailand) Thammanoon Sriroj (9)	ASEAN
3 Nov	Singha Classic	Nakhon Nayok	2,000,000	(Thailand) Thitiphun Chuayprakong (1)	
22 Dec	Singha All Thailand Grand Final	Khon Kaen	3,000,000	(Thailand) Chawalit Plaphol (2)	
23 Feb	Singha Masters	Chiang Rai	5,000,000	(Thailand) Poom Saksansin (1)	

=== Women's events ===
Date	Tournament	Location	Purse (฿)	Winner
17 Feb	Singha E-San Open	Khon Kaen	200,000	(Thailand) Kanphanitnan Muangkhumsakul (1)
21 Apr	Singha Pattaya Open	Chonburi	200,000	(Thailand) Jaruporn Palakawong Na Ayutthaya (2)
12 May	Road To Panasonic Open Singha Bangkok Open	Chachoengsao	200,000	(Thailand) Kanphanitnan Muangkhumsakul (2)
26 May	Road To Panasonic Open Singha Championship	Lopbori	200,000	(Thailand) Budsabakorn Sukapan (a) (1)
30 Jun	Road To Panasonic Open Singha All Thailand Championship	Chonburi	200,000	(Thailand) Tanaporn Kongkiatkrai (2)
21 Jul	Singha Hua Hin Open	Prachuap Khiri Khan	200,000	(Thailand) Pornanong Phatlum (5)
11 Aug	Singha Chiangmai Open	Chiang Mai	200,000	(Thailand) Suchaya Tangkamolprasert (a) (1)
3 Nov	Singha Classic	Nakhon Nayok	200,000	(Thailand) Sherman Santiwiwatthanaphong (a) (1)
22 Dec	Singha All Thailand Grand Final	Khon Kaen	200,000	(Thailand) Tanaporn Kongkiatkrai (3)
3 Feb	Singha Masters	Chiang Rai	300,000	(Thailand) Porani Chutichai (1)

== Order of Merit ==
The Order of Merit was based on prize money won during the season, calculated in Thai baht.

Position	Player	Prize money (฿)
1	(Thailand) Prayad Marksaeng	1,272,200
2	(Thailand) Kwanchai Tannin	903,825
3	(Thailand) Jazz Janewattananond	885,495
4	(Thailand) Thanyakon Khrongpha	859,037
5	(Thailand) Namchok Tantipokhakul	753,193
