= 2006 TPC Tour =

Golf tour season

2006 TPC Tour season
- Duration: 12 January 2006 – 22 December 2006
- Number of official events: 4
- Most wins: (Thailand) Pornanong Phatlum (2) (Thailand) Boonchu Ruangkit (2)
- Order of Merit (men): (Thailand) Boonchu Ruangkit

The 2006 TPC Tour was the eighth season of the TPC Tour, one of the main professional golf tours in Thailand since it was formed in 1999.

== Schedule ==
The following tables list official events during the 2006 season.

=== Men's events ===
Date	Tournament	Location	Purse (฿)	Winner (Note: The number in brackets after each winner's name is the number of All Thailand Golf Tour events they had won up to and including that tournament.)
15 Jan	Singha Masters	Chiang Rai	2,000,000	(Thailand) Boonchu Ruangkit (5)
1 Apr	Singha Pattaya Open	Chonburi	1,000,000	(Thailand) Prom Meesawat (3)
16 Jul	Chevrolet Championship	Chonburi	1,000,000	(Thailand) Thammanoon Sriroj (7)
22 Dec	Singha E-San Open	Nong Khai	1,000,000	(Thailand) Boonchu Ruangkit (6)

=== Women's events ===
Date	Tournament	Location	Purse (฿)	Winner
1 Apr	Singha Pattaya Open	Chonburi	100,000	(Thailand) Pornanong Phatlum (1)
22 Dec	Singha E-San Open	Nong Khai	100,000	(Thailand) Pornanong Phatlum (2)

== Order of Merit ==
The Order of Merit was based on prize money won during the season, calculated in Thai baht.

Position	Player	Prize money (฿)
1	(Thailand) Boonchu Ruangkit	479,333
2	(Thailand) Prom Meesawat	423,000
3	(Thailand) Thammanoon Sriroj	306,000
4	(Thailand) Udorn Duangdecha	167,667
5	(Thailand) Chapchai Nirat	145,633
