= Phachara Khongwatmai =

Thai professional golfer (born 1999)

Phachara Khongwatmai พชร คงวัดใหม่
Personal information
- Nationality: Thailand
- Born: 3 May 1999 (age 27) Songkhla, Thailand
- Height: 6 ft 0 in (183 cm)

Career
- Sport: Golf
- Turned professional: 2014
- Current tours: Asian Tour; European Tour
- Former tours: Asian Development Tour; LIV Golf
- Professional wins: 10

Number of wins by tour
- Asian Tour: 1
- Other: 9

Best results in major championships
- Masters Tournament: DNP
- PGA Championship: DNP
- U.S. Open: DNP
- The Open Championship: CUT: 2016, 2017
Medal record
Men's golf
Representing Thailand
Asian Games
Silver medal – second place	2022 Hangzhou	Team

Phachara Khongwatmai (Thai: พชร คงวัดใหม่; born 3 May 1999) is a Thai professional golfer.

Khongwatmai became the youngest winner of a professional tournament when he won the Singha Hua Hin Open on the All Thailand Golf Tour in July 2013 at the age of 14.

Khongwatmai played on the Asian Tour and Asian Development Tour in 2015. On the Asian Tour, he finished 64th on the Order of Merit, missing a 2016 Asian Tour card by one spot. On the Asian Development Tour, he won the PGM CCM Rahman Putra Championship in March at the age of 15, becoming the youngest winner on that tour. He also won the final tournament of the year, the Boonchu Ruangkit Championship to finish fifth on the ADT Order of Merit and earn his 2016 Asian Tour card. He also qualified for the 2016 Open Championship by finishing sixth at the 2015 Thailand Golf Championship.

Khongwatmai represented Thailand in the 2024 Summer Olympic Games in Paris, withdrawing from the 4th round of competition.

== Amateur wins ==
- 2012 TGA-CAT Junior Championship

== Professional wins (10) ==
=== Asian Tour wins (1) ===
No.	Date	Tournament	Winning score	Margin of victory	Runners-up
1	5 Dec 2021	Laguna Phuket Championship	−10 (66-65-69-70=270)	1 stroke	(Thailand) Denwit Boriboonsub, (South Korea) Kim Bi-o, (Thailand) Panuphol Pittayarat

Asian Tour playoff record (0–2)

No.	Year	Tournament	Opponent(s)	Result
1	2019	Sabah Masters	(Australia) David Gleeson, (India) Aman Raj, (Thailand) Pavit Tangkamolprasert	Tangkamolprasert won with birdie on second extra hole Raj eliminated by par on first hole
2	2023	Shinhan Donghae Open	(South Korea) Koh Gun-taek	Lost to birdie on first extra hole

=== Asian Development Tour wins (2) ===
No.	Date	Tournament	Winning score	Margin of victory	Runners-up
1	21 Mar 2015	CCM Rahman Putra Championship^{1}	−20 (71-66-65-66=268)	4 strokes	(Malaysia) Danny Chia, (United States) Shane Smith
2	27 Dec 2015	Boonchu Ruangkit Championship^{2}	−22 (64-69-63-66=262)	1 stroke	(Thailand) Thongchai Jaidee, (Thailand) Chinnarat Phadungsil

^{1}Co-sanctioned by the Professional Golf of Malaysia Tour
^{2}Co-sanctioned by the All Thailand Golf Tour

=== All Thailand Golf Tour wins (7) ===
No.	Date	Tournament	Winning score	Margin of victory	Runner(s)-up
1	21 Jul 2013	Singha Hua Hin Open^{1} (as an amateur)	−13 (66-67-71-67=271)	4 strokes	(Thailand) Sutijet Kooratanapisan, (Thailand) Prom Meesawat
2	27 Dec 2015	Boonchu Ruangkit Championship^{2}	−22 (64-69-63-66=262)	1 stroke	(Thailand) Thongchai Jaidee, (Thailand) Chinnarat Phadungsil
3	27 Mar 2016	Singha E-San Open^{1}	−13 (71-69-67-68=275)	2 strokes	(Thailand) Chapchai Nirat
4	25 Mar 2018	Singha Masters	−18 (67-67-65-71=270)	Playoff	(Thailand) Prayad Marksaeng
5	9 Feb 2020	Singha E-San Open (2)	−9 (64-73-72-70=279)	Playoff	(Thailand) Kosuke Hamamoto
6	24 Oct 2021	Singha Pattaya Open	−20 (59-70-63-68=260)	5 strokes	(Thailand) Sadom Kaewkanjana
7	7 Nov 2021	Singha E-San Open (3)	−12 (69-71-65-71=276)	Playoff	(Thailand) Chanat Sakulpolphaisan

^{1}Co-sanctioned by the ASEAN PGA Tour
^{2}Co-sanctioned by the Asian Development Tour

=== Other wins (1) ===
No.	Date	Tournament	Winning score	Margin of victory	Runners-up
1	8 Jun 2019	GolfSixes Cascais (with (Thailand) Thongchai Jaidee)	2–1		England − Tom Lewis and Paul Waring

== Results in major championships ==
Tournament	2016	2017
Masters Tournament		
U.S. Open		
The Open Championship	CUT	CUT
PGA Championship		

Did not play

CUT = missed the half-way cut
"T" = tied

== Results in World Golf Championships ==
Tournament	2017
Championship	
Match Play	
Invitational	
Champions	T46

Did not play

"T" = Tied

== Team appearances ==
Professional

- EurAsia Cup (representing Asia): 2018
- Asian Games (representing Thailand): 2022
