= ASEAN PGA Tour =

Southeast Asian men's professional golf tour

- Formerly: Mercedes-Benz Tour
- Sport: Golf
- Founded: 2007
- Founder: ASEAN PGA
- First season: 2007
- Folded: 2016
- Director: A. C. Wong
- Countries: Based in Southeast Asia
- Most titles: Order of Merit titles: (Thailand) Gunn Charoenkul (2); Tournament wins: (Thailand) Prayad Marksaeng (6)
- Related competitions: OneAsia Tour

The ASEAN PGA Tour was a men's developmental professional golf tour. It was formed in 2007 and was created to give more competitive opportunities to young and upcoming professionals in the Southeast Asia region.

The tour acted as a developmental tour to the now also defunct OneAsia Tour, giving cards to high finishers on the ASEAN PGA Tour Order of Merit each year.

In 2008, the tour signed a deal with Mercedes-Benz, being renamed as the Mercedes-Benz Tour. The deal lasted for three years and finished in 2010.

The tour eventually folded in 2016 after not releasing a schedule for 2017.

== 2016 season ==
=== Schedule ===
The following table lists official events during the 2016 season.

Date	Tournament	Host country	Purse (US$)	Winner (Note: The number in brackets after each winner's name is the number of ASEAN PGA Tour events they had won up to and including that tournament. This information is only shown for ASEAN PGA Tour members.)	Other tours (Note: ATGT − All Thailand Golf Tour; PGM − Professional Golf of Malaysia Tour.)
27 Mar	Singha E-San Open	Thailand	฿3,000,000	(Thailand) Phachara Khongwatmai (n/a)	ATGT
8 May	Singha Hua Hin Open	Thailand	฿2,000,000	(Thailand) Prayad Marksaeng (6)	ATGT
17 Jul	Singha Pattaya Open	Thailand	฿3,000,000	(Thailand) Sarit Suwannarat (a) (1)	ATGT
23 Jul	Jimei Korea Kulim Championship	Malaysia	150,000	(Thailand) Gunn Charoenkul (5)	PGM

=== Order of Merit ===
The Order of Merit was based on prize money won during the season, calculated in U.S. dollars.

Position	Player	Prize money ($)
1	(Thailand) Gunn Charoenkul	

== 2015 season ==
=== Schedule ===
The following table lists official events during the 2015 season.

Date	Tournament	Host country	Purse (US$)	Winner	Other tours (Note: ADT − Asian Development Tour; ATGT − All Thailand Golf Tour; PGM − Professional Golf of Malaysia Tour.)
1 Mar	Singha E-San Open	Thailand	฿3,000,000	(Thailand) Thaworn Wiratchant (4)	ATGT
29 Mar	Singha Pattaya Open	Thailand	฿3,000,000	(Thailand) Prayad Marksaeng (4)	ATGT
4 Apr	UMW Impian Championship	Malaysia	RM180,000	(Malaysia) Kemarol Baharin (1)	PGM
19 Jul	Singha Panasonic Hua Hin Open	Thailand	฿2,000,000	(Thailand) Pawin Ingkhapradit (1)	ATGT
9 Aug	Singha Chiang Mai Open	Thailand	฿3,000,000	(Thailand) Prayad Marksaeng (5)	ATGT
12 Sep	Penang Championship	Malaysia	RM180,000	(Malaysia) Khor Kheng Hwai (1)	PGM
17 Oct	PD Championship	Malaysia	RM180,000	(Thailand) Natthapong Niyomchon (1)	PGM
9 Jan	Warisan Harta Sabah Masters	Malaysia	100,000	(Thailand) Namchok Tantipokhakul (4)	ADT

=== Order of Merit ===
The Order of Merit was based on prize money won during the season, calculated in U.S. dollars.

Position	Player	Prize money ($)
1	(Thailand) Prayad Marksaeng	

== 2014 season ==
=== Schedule ===
The following table lists official events during the 2014 season.

Date	Tournament	Host country	Purse (US$)	Winner	Other tours
23 Mar	Singha E-San Open	Thailand	฿3,000,000	(Thailand) Gunn Charoenkul (2)	ATGT
13 Apr	Singha Pattaya Open	Thailand	฿3,000,000	(Thailand) Prayad Marksaeng (3)	ATGT
31 May	Melaka Championship	Malaysia	RM170,000	(Thailand) Gunn Charoenkul (3)	PGM
20 Jul	Singha Panasonic Hua Hin Open	Thailand	฿2,000,000	(Thailand) Gunn Charoenkul (4)	ATGT
3 Aug	Singha Chiang Mai Open	Thailand	฿2,000,000	(Thailand) Chapchai Nirat (n/a)	ATGT
9 Aug	Penang Championship	Malaysia	RM170,000	(Philippines) Jhonnel Ababa (1)	PGM
18 Oct	Port Dickson Championship II	Malaysia	RM170,000	(Malaysia) Lim Eng Seng (1)	PGM
21 Nov	Borobudur Classic	Indonesia	60,000	(Thailand) Supravee Phatam (1)	
17 Jan	Sabah Masters	Malaysia	75,000	(Singapore) Mardan Mamat (4)	

=== Order of Merit ===
The Order of Merit was titled as the Road to the Sabah Masters and was based on prize money won during the season, calculated in U.S. dollars. The top five players on the tour (not otherwise exempt) earned status to play on the 2015 OneAsia Tour.

Position	Player	Prize money ($)
1	(Thailand) Gunn Charoenkul	34,299
2	(Singapore) Mardan Mamat	20,085
3	(Thailand) Supravee Phatam	
4	(Thailand) Kwanchai Tannin	
5	(Thailand) Phiphatphong Naewsuk	
6	(Thailand) Rattanon Wannasrichan	

== 2013 season ==
=== Schedule ===
The following table lists official events during the 2013 season.

Date	Tournament	Host country	Purse (US$)	Winner	Other tours
17 Feb	Singha E-San Open	Thailand	฿3,000,000	(Thailand) Prayad Marksaeng (2)	ATGT
21 Apr	Singha Pattaya Open	Thailand	฿3,000,000	(Thailand) Kwanchai Tannin (1)	ATGT
27 Apr	Luang Prabang Laos Open	Laos	100,000	(Thailand) Namchok Tantipokhakul (3)	
11 May	A'Famosa Masters	Malaysia	RM180,000	(Singapore) Mardan Mamat (3)	PGM
15 Jun	Penang Classic	Malaysia	RM180,000	(Malaysia) Shaaban Hussin (1)	PGM
21 Jul	Singha Hua Hin Open	Thailand	฿2,000,000	(Thailand) Phachara Khongwatmai (a) (n/a)	ATGT
11 Aug	Singha Chiang Mai Open	Thailand	฿2,000,000	(Thailand) Thammanoon Sriroj (n/a)	ATGT
26 Oct	Negeri Sembilan Masters	Malaysia	RM180,000	(Thailand) Kwanchai Tannin (2)	PGM
11 Jan	Sabah Masters	Malaysia	75,000	(Thailand) Wisut Artjanawat (5)	

=== Order of Merit ===
The Order of Merit was based on prize money won during the season, calculated in U.S. dollars. The top five players on the tour (not otherwise exempt) earned status to play on the 2014 OneAsia Tour.

Position	Player	Prize money ($)
1	(Thailand) Kwanchai Tannin	35,630
2	(Thailand) Namchok Tantipokhakul	
3	(Thailand) Wisut Artjanawat	
4	(Thailand) Ratchapol Jantavara	
5	(Thailand) Thanyakon Khrongpha	
6	(Thailand) Sattaya Supupramai	

== 2012 season ==
=== Schedule ===
The following table lists official events during the 2012 season.

Date	Tournament	Host country	Purse (US$)	Winner	Other tours (Note: ATGT − All Thailand Golf Tour.)
6 May	Luang Prabang Laos Open	Laos	80,000	(Thailand) Thaworn Wiratchant (3)	
13 May	Singha Pattaya Open	Thailand	฿2,000,000	(Thailand) Prom Meesawat (n/a)	ATGT
19 Aug	Singha E-San Open	Thailand	฿2,000,000	(Thailand) Gunn Charoenkul (1)	ATGT
27 Oct	Palembang Musi Championship	Indonesia	150,000	(Malaysia) Nicholas Fung (2)	
17 Nov	Gowa Classic	Indonesia	100,000	(Thailand) Pavit Tangkamolprasert (1)	
12 Jan	Sabah Masters	Malaysia	75,000	(Philippines) Antonio Lascuña (1)	

=== Order of Merit ===
The Order of Merit was based on prize money won during the season, calculated in U.S. dollars. The top 10 players on the tour (not otherwise exempt) earned status to play on the 2013 OneAsia Tour.

Position	Player	Prize money ($)
1	(Malaysia) Nicholas Fung	31,884

== 2011 season ==
=== Schedule ===
The following table lists official events during the 2011 season.

Date	Tournament	Host country	Purse (US$)	Winner	Other tours
8 May	Singha Pattaya Open	Thailand	฿1,500,000	(Thailand) Prom Meesawat (n/a)	ATGT
11 Jun	ICTSI Mount Malarayat Championship	Philippines	50,000	(Thailand) Thanyakon Khrongpha (2)	
2 Jul	Singha E-San Open	Thailand	฿1,500,000	(Thailand) Udorn Duangdecha (2)	ATGT
10 Jul	Negeri Sembilan Masters Invitational	Malaysia	RM500,000	(Bangladesh) Siddikur Rahman (1)	
16 Oct	Palembang Musi Championship	Indonesia	75,000	(Thailand) Wisut Artjanawat (3)	
6 Nov	Sabah Masters	Malaysia	60,000	(Thailand) Wisut Artjanawat (4)	
3 Dec	Ancora Classic	Indonesia	50,000	(Philippines) Ferdie Aunzo (1)	

=== Order of Merit ===
The Order of Merit was based on prize money won during the season, calculated in U.S. dollars. The top five players on the tour (not otherwise exempt) earned status to play on the 2012 OneAsia Tour.

Position	Player	Prize money ($)
1	(Thailand) Wisut Artjanawat	24,001
2	(Malaysia) Nicholas Fung	19,298

== 2010 season ==
=== Schedule ===
The following table lists official events during the 2010 season.

Date	Tournament	Host country	Purse (US$)	Winner	Other tours
17 Apr	Mercedes-Benz Masters Philippines	Philippines	60,000	(Philippines) Artemio Murakami (1)	
2 May	Singha Pattaya Open	Thailand	฿1,600,000	(Thailand) Udorn Duangdecha (1)	ATGT
8 May	Kariza Indonesia Championship	Indonesia	50,000	(Thailand) Thanyakon Khrongpha (1)	
5 Jun	Mercedes-Benz Masters Thailand	Thailand	60,000	(Philippines) Juvic Pagunsan (1)	
26 Jun	ICTSI Mount Malarayat Championship	Philippines	50,000	(Thailand) Chawalit Plaphol (1)	
18 Jul	Singha E-San Open	Thailand	฿1,600,000	(Thailand) Thaworn Wiratchant (2)	ATGT
14 Aug	Mercedes-Benz Masters Singapore	Singapore	60,000	(Thailand) Chawalit Plaphol (2)	
21 Aug	Mercedes-Benz Masters Malaysia	Malaysia	60,000	(Singapore) Mardan Mamat (2)	
2 Oct	Mercedes-Benz Masters Vietnam	Vietnam	60,000	(Malaysia) Nicholas Fung (1)	
30 Oct	Mercedes-Benz Masters Indonesia	Indonesia	80,000	(Thailand) Atthaphon Prathummanee (1)	

=== Order of Merit ===
The Order of Merit was based on prize money won during the season, calculated in U.S. dollars. The leading player on the tour (not otherwise exempt) earned status to play on the 2011 OneAsia Tour.

Position	Player	Prize money ($)
1	(Philippines) Juvic Pagunsan	25,451
2	(Malaysia) Nicholas Fung	25,373
3	(Thailand) Chawalit Plaphol	22,245
4	(Thailand) Namchok Tantipokhakul	20,211
5	(Thailand) Thanyakon Khrongpha	18,881

== 2009 season ==
=== Schedule ===
The following table lists official events during the 2009 season.

Date	Tournament	Host country	Purse (US$)	Winner	Other tours
14 Mar	Mercedes-Benz Masters Singapore	Singapore	60,000	(Singapore) Mardan Mamat (1)	
5 Apr	Singha Pattaya Open	Thailand	฿1,500,000	(Thailand) Kiradech Aphibarnrat (n/a)	ATGT
23 May	ICTSI Mount Malarayat Championship	Philippines	50,000	(Philippines) Angelo Que (3)	
12 Jun	Heritage Melaka Classic	Malaysia	50,000	(Thailand) Thaworn Wiratchant (1)	
18 Jul	Mercedes-Benz Masters Malaysia	Malaysia	60,000	(Taiwan) Lu Chien-soon (1)	
19 Sep	B-Ing TPC Championships	Thailand	฿1,500,000	(Thailand) Namchok Tantipokhakul (1)	ATGT
17 Oct	Mercedes-Benz Masters Indonesia	Indonesia	60,000	(Thailand) Kwanchai Tannin (1)	
14 Nov	Mercedes-Benz Masters Vietnam	Vietnam	80,000	(Thailand) Namchok Tantipokhakul (2)	

=== Order of Merit ===
The Order of Merit was based on prize money won during the season, calculated in U.S. dollars.

Position	Player	Prize money ($)
1	(Thailand) Namchok Tantipokhakul	27,540
2	(Thailand) Kwanchai Tannin	17,225
3	(Philippines) Antonio Lascuña	14,089
4	(Thailand) Wisut Artjanawat	12,908
5	(Singapore) Mardan Mamat	12,901

== 2008 season ==
=== Schedule ===
The following table lists official events during the 2008 season.

Date	Tournament	Host country	Purse (US$)	Winner	Other tours
17 May	Mercedes-Benz Masters Indonesia	Indonesia	50,000	(Singapore) Lam Chih Bing (1)	
25 May	Mercedes-Benz Masters Philippines	Philippines	50,000	(Thailand) Wisut Artjanawat (1)	
5 Jul	ICTSI Mount Malarayat Championship	Philippines	50,000	(Philippines) Angelo Que (2)	
26 Jul	Mercedes-Benz Masters Malaysia	Malaysia	50,000	(Malaysia) Ben Leong (1)	
7 Sep	B-Ing TPC Championships	Thailand	฿1,600,000	(Philippines) Felix Casas (1)	ATGT
25 Oct	International Championship	Indonesia	50,000	(Indonesia) Rory Hie (1)	
8 Nov	Mercedes-Benz Masters Singapore	Singapore	50,000	(Thailand) Pariya Junhasavasdikul (1)	
23 Nov	Mercedes-Benz Masters Vietnam	Vietnam	50,000	(Thailand) Wisut Artjanawat (2)	
30 Nov	Mercedes-Benz Masters Thailand	Thailand	75,000	(Malaysia) Danny Chia (2)	

=== Order of Merit ===
The Order of Merit was based on prize money won during the season, calculated in U.S. dollars.

Position	Player	Prize money ($)
1	(Philippines) Angelo Que	32,210
2	(Malaysia) Danny Chia	31,722
3	(Thailand) Wisut Artjanawat	28,200
4	(Philippines) Mars Pucay	22,573
5	(Thailand) Nakul Vichitryuthasastr	20,833

== 2007 season ==
=== Schedule ===
The following table lists official events during the 2007 season.

Date	Tournament	Host country	Purse (US$)	Winner	Other tours (Note: TPCT − TPC Tour.)
8 Sep	International Championship	Indonesia	50,000	(Malaysia) Danny Chia (1)	
20 Oct	ICTSI Mount Malarayat Championship	Philippines	30,000	(Philippines) Mars Pucay (1)	
10 Nov	Laguna National ASEAN Championship	Singapore	50,000	(Philippines) Angelo Que (1)	
17 Nov	Mercedes-Benz Championship Vietnam	Vietnam	50,000	(Philippines) Mars Pucay (2)	
22 Dec	Singha E-San Open	Thailand	฿1,600,000	(Thailand) Prayad Marksaeng (1)	TPCT

== Order of Merit winners ==
Year	Winner	Prize money (US$)
2016	(Thailand) Gunn Charoenkul (2)	
2015	(Thailand) Prayad Marksaeng	
2014	(Thailand) Gunn Charoenkul	34,299
2013	(Thailand) Kwanchai Tannin	35,630
2012	(Malaysia) Nicholas Fung	31,884
2011	(Thailand) Wisut Artjanawat	24,001
2010	(Philippines) Juvic Pagunsan	25,451
2009	(Thailand) Namchok Tantipokhakul	27,540
2008	(Philippines) Angelo Que	32,210
