= Wichanee Meechai =

Thai professional golfer

Personal information
- Nickname: Jan
- Nationality: Thailand
- Born: 5 January 1993 (age 33) Bangkok, Thailand
- Height: 5 ft 7 in (1.70 m)

Career
- Sport: Golf
- College: Ramkhamhaeng University
- Turned professional: 2010
- Current tour: LPGA Tour (joined 2016)
- Professional wins: 5

Best results in LPGA major championships
- Chevron Championship: T25: 2022
- Women's PGA C'ship: T12: 2021
- U.S. Women's Open: T6: 2024
- Women's British Open: T24: 2021
- Evian Championship: T29: 2021

Wichanee Meechai (Thai: วิชาณี มีชัย; born: 5 January 1993) is a Thai professional golfer playing on the U.S.-based LPGA Tour.

== Early life ==
Meechai was born on 5 January 1993 in Bangkok, Thailand. Her father, Wanchai, is the Senior Tournament Director on the Asian Tour. Meechai started playing golf at the age of 13. She graduated from the Ramkhamhaeng University.

== Professional career ==
Meechai turned professional in 2010. On 25 May 2013, she set the new China LPGA Tour record for low round, with a round of 9-under-par 63, to collect her first international victory at the 2013 Beijing Challenge.

Meechai captured her first career Taiwan LPGA Tour win at the 2015 Yeangder TLPGA Open, outlasted compatriot Mind Muangkhumsakul in the first playoff hole. In December 2015, she finished tied for 22nd at the final stage LPGA Qualifying Tournament to earn LPGA Membership for the 2016 season.

In 2016, Meechai recorded nine top-10 finishes, including three runner-ups, in her first season playing in the United States to finish fourth on the Symetra Tour money list to earn LPGA membership for the 2017 season.

On 23 May 2021, Meechai recorded her career-best LPGA Tour finish when she tied for fifth place at the 2021 Pure Silk Championship in Virginia. She subsequently recorded her then highest finish in a major championship in June 2021, tying for 12th place in the 2021 Women's PGA Championship.

In June 2024, Meechai recorded a new personal best finish at a major, tying for 6th place at the 2024 U.S. Women's Open. She has also won more prize money during the 2024 season than any previous season of her career, having earned over $700,000.

== Professional wins (5) ==
=== China LPGA Tour wins (1) ===
- 2013 Beijing Challenge

=== Taiwan LPGA Tour wins (1) ===
- 2015 Yeangder TLPGA Open

=== Thai LPGA Tour wins (2) ===
- 2013 3rd Singha-SAT Thai LPGA Championship
- 2020 4th Singha-SAT Thai LPGA Championship

=== All Thailand Golf Tour wins (1) ===
- 2012 Singha Classic

== Results in LPGA majors ==
Results not in chronological order.

Tournament	2017	2018	2019	2020	2021	2022	2023	2024	2025
Chevron Championship						T25	CUT		CUT
U.S. Women's Open		T52	T50		T30			T6	60
Women's PGA Championship	CUT	T49	T66	CUT	T12	CUT	CUT	CUT	
The Evian Championship	CUT	CUT		NT	T29	CUT	T36	CUT	
Women's British Open		CUT			T24	T58		T37	

Top 10
Did not play

CUT = missed the half-way cut
NT = no tournament
"T" = tied

=== Summary ===
Tournament	Wins	2nd	3rd	Top-5	Top-10	Top-25	Events	Cuts made
Chevron Championship	0	0	0	0	0	1	3	1
U.S. Women's Open	0	0	0	0	1	1	5	5
Women's PGA Championship	0	0	0	0	0	1	8	3
The Evian Championship	0	0	0	0	0	0	6	2
Women's British Open	0	0	0	0	0	1	4	3
Totals	0	0	0	0	1	4	26	14

- Most consecutive cuts made – 5 (2021 Women's PGA – 2022 Chevron)
- Longest streak of top-10s – 1 (once)

== LPGA Tour career summary ==
Year	Tournaments played	Cuts made*	Wins	2nd	3rd	Top 10s	Best finish	Earnings ($)	Money list rank	Scoring average	Scoring rank
2016	1	0	0	0	0	0	CUT	0	n/a	77.00	n/a
2017	21	8	0	0	0	1	T9	90,395	106	71.89	85
2018	26	16	0	0	0	2	T7	188,841	82	72.21	97
2019	20	9	0	0	0	0	T17	98,166	112	71.98	96
2020	6	4	0	0	0	0	T11	28,248	124	72.84	99
2021	24	17	0	0	0	2	T5	406,770	54	71.21	59
2022	27	19	0	0	0	2	T8	303,651	75	71.68	88
2023	20	14	0	0	0	1	T10	243,154	92	71.46	72
2024	22	16	0	0	0	3	T6	712,756	58	71.94	93
2025	14	5	0	0	0	0	T14	84,035	137	73.13	143
Totals^	181	108	0	0	0	11	T5	2,156,016	215		

^ Official as of 2025 season
* Includes matchplay and other tournaments without a cut.
