= 2007 TPC Tour =

Golf tour season

2007 TPC Tour season
- Duration: 17 January 2007 – 22 December 2007
- Number of official events: 4
- Most wins: (Thailand) Prayad Marksaeng (2)
- Order of Merit (men): (Thailand) Prayad Marksaeng

The 2007 TPC Tour was the ninth season of the TPC Tour, one of the main professional golf tours in Thailand since it was formed in 1999.

== Schedule ==
The following tables list official events during the 2007 season.

=== Men's events ===
Date	Tournament	Location	Purse (฿)	Winner (Note: The number in brackets after each winner's name is the number of All Thailand Golf Tour events they had won up to and including that tournament.)	Other tours (Note: ASEAN − ASEAN PGA Tour.)
20 Jan	Singha Masters	Chiang Rai	2,000,000	(Thailand) Thaworn Wiratchant (4)	
7 Apr	Singha Pattaya Open	Chonburi	1,000,000	(Thailand) Chapchai Nirat (1)	
21 Jul	B-Ing TPC Championships	Chonburi	1,500,000	(Thailand) Prayad Marksaeng (4)	
22 Dec	Singha E-San Open	Nong Khai	1,600,000	(Thailand) Prayad Marksaeng (5)	ASEAN

=== Women's events ===
Date	Tournament	Location	Purse (฿)	Winner
7 Apr	Singha Pattaya Open	Chonburi	100,000	(Thailand) Titiya Plucksataporn (1)
21 Jul	B-Ing TPC Championships	Chonburi	100,000	(Thailand) Rungthiwa Pangjan (1)

== Order of Merit ==
The Order of Merit was based on prize money won during the season, calculated in Thai baht.

Position	Player	Prize money (฿)
1	(Thailand) Prayad Marksaeng	340,667
2	(Thailand) Chapchai Nirat	320,000
3	(Thailand) Thaworn Wiratchant	317,250
4	(Thailand) Kwanchai Tannin	228,000
5	(Thailand) Prom Meesawat	188,000
