= Prayad Marksaeng =

Thai professional golfer (born 1966)

Prayad Marksaeng ประหยัด มากแสง
Personal information
- Nationality: Thailand
- Born: 30 January 1966 (age 60)
- Height: 1.63 m (5 ft 4 in)
- Weight: 68 kg (150 lb; 10.7 st)

Career
- Sport: Golf
- Turned professional: 1991
- Current tour: Japan PGA Senior Tour
- Former tours: European Tour; Japan Golf Tour; Asian Tour; All Thailand Golf Tour; ASEAN PGA Tour
- Professional wins: 59
- Highest ranking: 47 (29 March 2009)

Number of wins by tour
- Japan Golf Tour: 6
- Asian Tour: 10 (Tied-4th all-time)
- Other: 42

Best results in major championships
- Masters Tournament: CUT: 2009
- PGA Championship: T15: 2008
- U.S. Open: DNP
- The Open Championship: CUT: 1999, 2008, 2009, 2011, 2012, 2017

Achievements and awards
- Asian PGA Tour Players' Player of the Year: 1997
- All Thailand Golf Tour Order of Merit winner: 2007, 2008, 2011, 2013, 2014, 2015
- ASEAN PGA Tour Order of Merit winner: 2015
- Japan PGA Senior Tour Order of Merit winner: 2016, 2017, 2018, 2022

Prayad Marksaeng (Thai: ประหยัด มากแสง; born 30 January 1966) is a Thai professional golfer.

== Career ==
Prayad was a member of Thailand's winning golf team at the 1987 South East Asian Games and turned professional in 1991. He has been a member of the Asian Tour since it began in its modern form in 1995. He has won seven events on the tour, becoming one of the first ten men to reach a million U.S. dollars in career earnings. He has also competed on the Japan Golf Tour and in 2008 won three tournaments in Japan.

Prayad represented Thailand at the 2007 and 2008 Omega Mission Hills World Cup and has been featured in the top 50 of the Official World Golf Ranking.

Prayad received a special invitation to play in the 2008 Masters Tournament. Marksaeng shot an 82 (+10) in the first round and withdrew midway through the second round due to a back injury.

At the age of 50, Prayad won the SMBC Singapore Open by one stroke over Phachara Khongwatmai, Jbe' Kruger, Juvic Pagunsan and Song Young-han. This event was co-sanctioned by the Japan Golf Tour and the Asian Tour. This win also guaranteed him a place in the 2017 Open Championship.

== Professional wins (59) ==
=== Japan Golf Tour wins (6) ===
| No. | Date | Tournament | Winning score | Margin of victory | Runner(s)-up |
|---|---|---|---|---|---|
| 1 | 1 Jun 2008 | Mitsubishi Diamond Cup Golf | −10 (70-70-66-68=274) | 1 stroke | (Japan) Shintaro Kai |
| 2 | 22 Jun 2008 | Gateway to The Open Mizuno Open Yomiuri Classic | −15 (69-66-69-65=269) | 1 stroke | (Japan) Azuma Yano |
| 3 | 23 Nov 2008 | Dunlop Phoenix Tournament | −8 (68-70-67-71=276) | 1 stroke | (Japan) Ryo Ishikawa |
| 4 | 17 Mar 2013 | Thailand Open^{1} | −24 (68-67-65-64=264) | 2 strokes | (Australia) Scott Strange |
| 5 | 26 Jul 2015 | Dunlop Srixon Fukushima Open | −24 (69-65-67-63=264) | 1 stroke | (South Korea) Song Young-han |
| 6 | 22 Jan 2017 | SMBC Singapore Open^{2} | −9 (71-69-68-67=275) | 1 stroke | (Thailand) Phachara Khongwatmai, (South Africa) Jbe' Kruger, (Philippines) Juvic Pagunsan, (South Korea) Song Young-han |

^{1}Co-sanctioned by the OneAsia Tour
^{2}Co-sanctioned by the Asian Tour

Japan Golf Tour playoff record (0–1)

| No. | Year | Tournament | Opponent | Result |
|---|---|---|---|---|
| 1 | 2007 | Woodone Open Hiroshima | (Japan) Toru Taniguchi | Lost to birdie on first extra hole |

=== Asian Tour wins (10) ===
| No. | Date | Tournament | Winning score | Margin of victory | Runner(s)-up |
|---|---|---|---|---|---|
| 1 | 2 Jun 1996 | Volvo China Open | −19 (70-66-67-66=269) | 9 strokes | (Taiwan) Hsieh Yu-shu |
| 2 | 5 Oct 1997 | Yokohama Singapore PGA Championship | −11 (71-71-65-70=277) | 1 stroke | (Indonesia) Kasiyadi |
| 3 | 23 Nov 1997 | Lexus Thai International | −18 (70-69-65-66=270) | 1 stroke | (India) Arjun Atwal |
| 4 | 20 Feb 2000 | Casino Filipino Open | −5 (72-70-70-71=283) | 1 stroke | (United States) Mike Cunning, (Japan) Tatsuhiko Ichihara, (United States) Ted Purdy |
| 5 | 2 Oct 2005 | Crowne Plaza Open | −8 (72-70-70-68=280) | Playoff | (Australia) Marcus Both |
| 6 | 9 Dec 2007 | Volvo Masters of Asia | −13 (67-71-68-69=275) | 1 stroke | (England) Chris Rodgers |
| 7 | 16 Jun 2013 | Queen's Cup | −14 (71-64-68-67=270) | 3 strokes | (Thailand) Arnond Vongvanij |
| 8 | 19 Jan 2014 (2013 season) | King's Cup Golf Hua Hin | −12 (68-71-71-66=276) | 1 stroke | (Sweden) Rikard Karlberg |
| 9 | 21 Jun 2015 | Queen's Cup (2) | −14 (69-65-71-65=270) | 2 strokes | (Thailand) Thanyakon Khrongpha |
| 10 | 22 Jan 2017 | SMBC Singapore Open^{1} | −9 (71-69-68-67=275) | 1 stroke | (Thailand) Phachara Khongwatmai, (South Africa) Jbe' Kruger, (Philippines) Juvic Pagunsan, (South Korea) Song Young-han |

^{1}Co-sanctioned by the Japan Golf Tour

Asian Tour playoff record (1–0)

| No. | Year | Tournament | Opponent | Result |
|---|---|---|---|---|
| 1 | 2005 | Crowne Plaza Open | (Australia) Marcus Both | Won with birdie on first extra hole |

=== All Thailand Golf Tour wins (18) ===
- 2000 Singha Masters
- 2004 Singha Masters
- 2005 Singha Pattaya Open
- 2007 B-Ing TPC Championships, Singha E-San Open^{1}
- 2008 Singha Masters
- 2009 Singha Championship
- 2010 Singha Classic
- 2012 Singha Masters
- 2013 Singha E-San Open^{1}, Road To Panasonic Open Singha Bangkok Open
- 2014 Singha Pattaya Open^{1}, Singha All Thailand Grand Final
- 2015 Singha Pattaya Open^{1}, Singha Chiang Mai Open^{1}, Singha Masters
- 2016 Singha Hua Hin Open^{1}, Singha Chiang Mai Open

^{1}Co-sanctioned by the ASEAN PGA Tour

=== ASEAN PGA Tour wins (6) ===
| No. | Date | Tournament | Winning score | Margin of victory | Runner(s)-up |
|---|---|---|---|---|---|
| 1 | 22 Dec 2007 | Singha E-San Open^{1} | −19 (67-69-64-65=265) | Playoff | (Thailand) Boonchu Ruangkit |
| 2 | 17 Feb 2013 | Singha E-San Open^{1} (2) | −14 (66-70-66-72=274) | Playoff | (South Korea) Baek Seuk-hyun, (Thailand) Thanyakon Khrongpha, (Thailand) Sattaya Supupramai |
| 3 | 13 Apr 2014 | Singha Pattaya Open^{1} | −20 (64-67-68-69=268) | 1 stroke | (Thailand) Kwanchai Tannin |
| 4 | 29 Mar 2015 | Singha Pattaya Open^{1} (2) | −22 (66-69-60-67=262) | 4 strokes | (Thailand) Piya Swangarunporn |
| 5 | 9 Aug 2015 | Singha Chiang Mai Open^{1} | −18 (66-67-68-65=266) | 1 stroke | (Thailand) Jazz Janewattananond |
| 6 | 8 May 2016 | Singha Hua Hin Open^{1} | −13 (68-68-66-69=271) | 1 stroke | (Thailand) Tirawat Kaewsiribandit, (Thailand) Prom Meesawat |

^{1}Co-sanctioned by the All Thailand Golf Tour

=== Thailand PGA Tour wins (1) ===
| No. | Date | Tournament | Winning score | Margin of victory | Runner-up |
|---|---|---|---|---|---|
| 1 | 17 Mar 2018 | Singha-SAT Lamphun Championship | −21 (61-63-66-69=259) | 4 strokes | (Thailand) Thanyakon Khrongpha |

=== Japan PGA Senior Tour wins (25) ===
| No. | Date | Tournament | Winning score | Margin of victory | Runner-up |
|---|---|---|---|---|---|
| 1 | 31 Jul 2016 | Maruhan Cup Taiheiyo Club Senior | −13 (68-63=131) | 2 strokes | (Japan) Kiyoshi Maita |
| 2 | 10 Sep 2016 | Komatsu Open | −17 (65-67-67=199) | 5 strokes | (Taiwan) Lu Wen-teh, (Japan) Kazuhiro Takami |
| 3 | 18 Sep 2016 | Japan Senior Open Golf Championship | −12 (68-71-70-67=276) | 3 strokes | (Japan) Toru Suzuki |
| 4 | 9 Oct 2016 | Japan PGA Senior Championship Sumitomo Corporation Summit Cup | −20 (66-69-64-69=268) | 8 strokes | (England) Barry Lane |
| 5 | 3 Jun 2017 | Sumida Cup Senior Golf Tournament | −16 (66-67-67=200) | 1 stroke | (South Korea) Park Boo-won |
| 6 | 11 Jun 2017 | Starts Senior Golf Tournament | −16 (66-67-67=200) | 1 stroke | (Japan) Ryoken Kawagishi, (Japan) Katsumi Kubo, (Japan) Ikuo Shirahama |
| 7 | 17 Sep 2017 | Japan Senior Open Golf Championship (2) | −18 (63-63-70-74=270) | 4 strokes | (Japan) Kōki Idoki, (Japan) Toru Suzuki |
| 8 | 4 Nov 2017 | Fujifilm Senior Championship | −11 (73-65-67=205) | 2 strokes | (Japan) Takeshi Sakiyama |
| 9 | 20 May 2018 | Fubon Yeangder Senior Cup^{1} | −12 (67-67-70=204) | 1 stroke | (Taiwan) Lu Chien-soon |
| 10 | 10 Jun 2018 | Starts Senior Golf Tournament (2) | −13 (68-65-70=203) | 2 strokes | (Japan) Katsumi Kubo |
| 11 | 15 Jul 2018 | Japan Senior Open Golf Championship (3) | −5 (74-68-67-70=279) | 5 strokes | (Japan) Toru Taniguchi |
| 12 | 5 Aug 2018 | Maruhan Cup Taiheiyo Club Senior (2) | −9 (65-70=135) | 1 stroke | (Japan) Katsumi Kubo, (Japan) Takeshi Sakiyama, (Japan) Tsuyoshi Yoneyama |
| 13 | 19 Aug 2018 | Fancl Classic | −13 (66-72-65=203) | Playoff | (United States) Gregory Meyer |
| 14 | 25 Aug 2019 | Fancl Classic (2) | −9 (68-67-72=207) | Playoff | (South Korea) Suk Jong-yul, (Japan) Naoyuki Tamura |
| 15 | 8 Sep 2019 | Maruhan Cup Taiheiyo Club Senior (3) | −10 (68-66=134) | 1 stroke | (Japan) Hidezumi Shirakata |
| 16 | 18 Sep 2022 | Japan Senior Open Golf Championship (4) | −12 (70-66-70-70=276) | 4 strokes | (Japan) Hiroyuki Fujita |
| 17 | 9 Oct 2022 | Japan PGA Senior Championship Sumitomo Corporation Summit Cup (2) | −13 (68-70-70-67=275) | 5 strokes | (Japan) Katsumasa Miyamoto |
| 18 | 16 Oct 2022 | Trust Group Cup Sasebo Senior Open | −13 (65-66=131) | 4 strokes | (Japan) Hiroo Kawai, (Japan) Katsumasa Miyamoto |
| 19 | 23 Oct 2022 | ISPS Handa Yappariomoshiroi Senior Tournament | −12 (68-67-66=201) | 3 strokes | (Japan) Mitsuhiro Watanabe |
| 20 | 30 Oct 2022 | Fukuoka Senior Open | −7 (69-68=137) | 1 stroke | (Japan) Hiroyuki Fujita |
| 21 | 4 Nov 2022 | Cosmohealth Cup Senior Tournament | −9 (68-67=135) | 3 strokes | (Japan) Tomoyuki Hirano |
| 22 | 27 Aug 2023 | Maruhan Cup Taiheiyo Club Senior (4) | −11 (67-66=133) | Playoff | (Japan) Hiroaki Iijima |
| 23 | 27 Oct2024 | Fukuoka Senior Open (2) | −13 (64-67=131) | 3 strokes | (South Korea) Jang Ik-jae, (Japan) Koichi Kashimura |
| 24 | 18 Apr 2025 | Nojima Championcup Hakone Senior | −7 (67-68=135) | 2 strokes | (Thailand) Thaworn Wiratchant |
| 25 | 26 Oct 2025 | Fukuoka Senior Open (3) | −9 (66-69=135) | 2 strokes | (Japan) Katsunori Kuwabara, (Japan) Hidezumi Shirakata |

^{1}Co-sanctioned by the Taiwan PGA Tour

== Results in major championships ==
| Tournament | 1999 | 2000 | 2001 | 2002 | 2003 | 2004 | 2005 | 2006 | 2007 | 2008 | 2009 | 2010 | 2011 | 2012 | 2013 | 2014 | 2015 | 2016 | 2017 |
|---|---|---|---|---|---|---|---|---|---|---|---|---|---|---|---|---|---|---|---|
| Masters Tournament | | | | | | | | | | WD | CUT | | | | | | | | |
| The Open Championship | CUT | | | | | | | | | CUT | CUT | | CUT | CUT | | | | | CUT |
| PGA Championship | | | | | | | | | | T15 | CUT | | | | | | | | |

Note: Marksaeng never played in the U.S. Open.

Did not play

CUT = missed the half-way cut
WD = withdrew
"T" = tied

== Results in World Golf Championships ==
| Tournament | 2008 | 2009 |
|---|---|---|
| Match Play | | R64 |
| Championship | | T13 |
| Invitational | T68 | T36 |
| Champions | | T51 |

Did not play

QF, R16, R32, R64 = Round in which player lost in match play
"T" = Tied
Note that the HSBC Champions did not become a WGC event until 2009.

== Team appearances ==
- Dynasty Cup (representing Asia): 2003 (winners), 2005 (winners)
- World Cup (representing Thailand): 1994, 2007, 2008, 2009, 2013
- Royal Trophy (representing Asia): 2009 (winners), 2010
- EurAsia Cup (representing Asia): 2014, 2016
- Amata Friendship Cup (representing Thailand): 2018 (winners)

== See also ==
- List of golfers with most Asian Tour wins
