= Thidapa Suwannapura =

Thai professional golfer (born 1992)

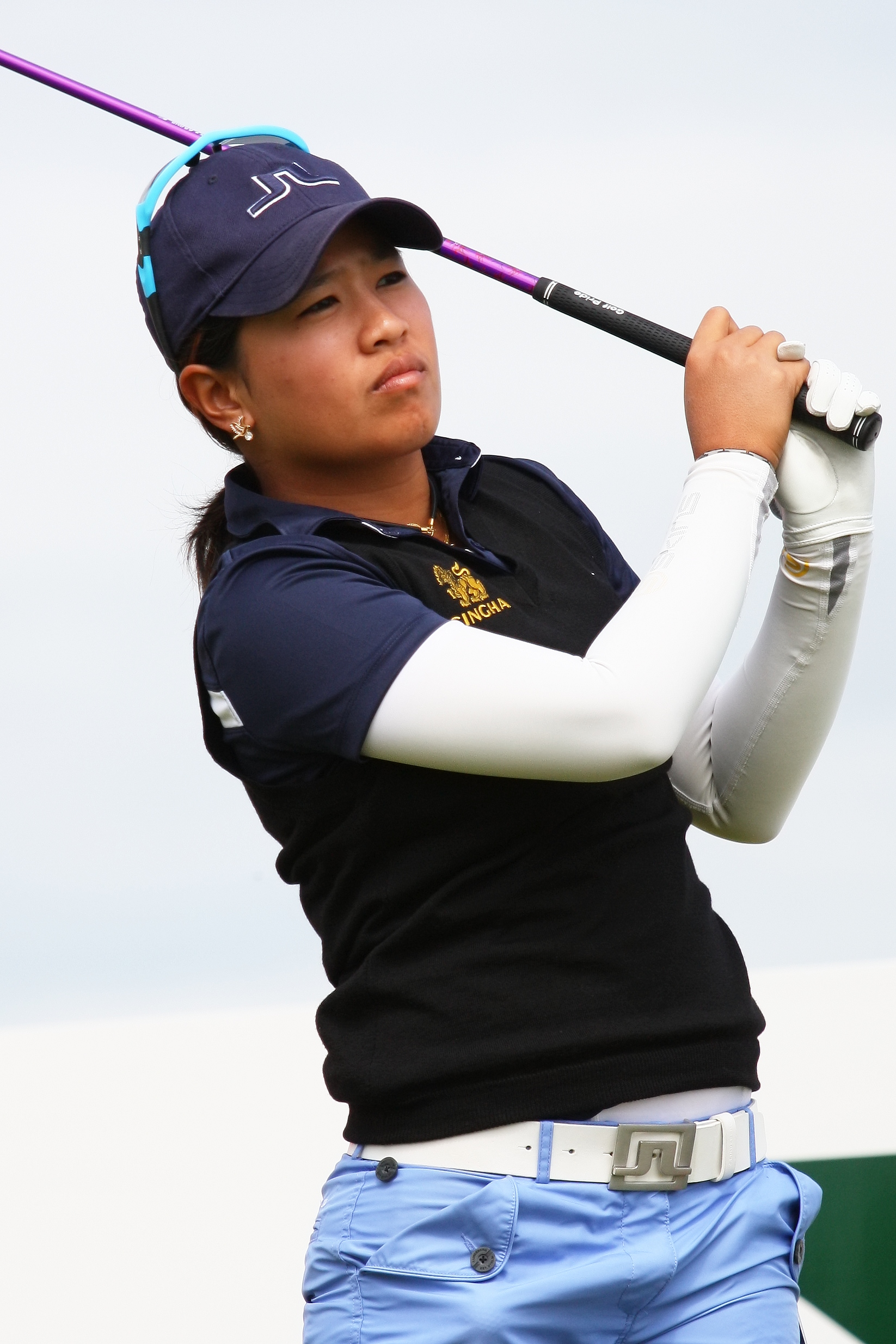

Personal information
- Nickname: Jasmine
- Nationality: Thailand
- Born: 20 November 1992 (age 34) Bangkok, Thailand
- Height: 5 ft 5 in (165 cm)

Career
- Sport: Golf
- College: Ramkhamhaeng University
- Turned professional: 2011
- Current tour: LPGA Tour
- Former tours: Ladies European Tour; Ladies Asian Golf Tour; Symetra Tour
- Professional wins: 11

Number of wins by tour
- LPGA Tour: 3
- Ladies European Tour: 1
- Ladies Asian Golf Tour: 1
- Epson Tour: 1
- Other: 6

Best results in LPGA major championships
- Chevron Championship: T27: 2026
- Women's PGA C'ship: T23: 2020
- U.S. Women's Open: T35: 2021
- Women's British Open: 2nd: 2020
- Evian Championship: T20: 2015
Medal record
Women's golf
Representing Thailand
SEA Games
Silver medal – second place	2009 Vientiane	Women's team

Thidapa "Jasmine" Suwannapura (Thai: ธิฎาภา สุวัณณะปุระ; born 20 November 1992) is a Thai professional golfer.

== Early life and amateur career ==
In 1992, Suwannapura was born. She is a Ramkhamhaeng University graduate.

She qualified for the Honda LPGA Thailand as an amateur three times: in 2006, 2008, and 2010. She is also the winner of the 2008 Hong Kong Ladies Amateur, the 2008 Singha Pattaya Open, the 2009 Srixon Junior International by Jack Newton (in Australia). She also won the 2010 Malaysia Amateur Open, the 2010 Honda Junior Masters, and the 2010 Riverwoods Junior Championship (in the Netherlands).

== Professional career ==
In 2011, Suwannapura turned professional. She finished 8th at the ISPS Handa Women's Australian Open in the 2013 season and won the Hero Women's Indian Open in November 2013 by three strokes, winning $45,000. On the 2013 LPGA Tour she made 14 cuts out of 21 events.

== Amateur wins ==
- 2008 Singha Pattaya Open, Hong Kong Ladies Amateur
- 2009 Srixon Junior International
- 2010 Malaysia Amateur Open, Honda Junior Masters, Dutch Junior Open

== Professional wins (11) ==
=== LPGA Tour wins (3) ===
No.	Date	Tournament	Winning score	To par	Margin of victory	Runner(s)-up	Winner's share ($)
1	15 Jul 2018	Marathon Classic	65-69-71-65=270	−14	Playoff	(United States) Brittany Lincicome	240,000
2	20 Jul 2019	Dow Great Lakes Bay Invitational (with (United States) Cydney Clanton)	67-64-63-59=253	−27	6 strokes	(South Korea) Ko Jin-young and (Australia) Minjee Lee	241,269 (each)
3	29 Sep 2024	Walmart NW Arkansas Championship	63-72-61=196	−17	Playoff	(United States) Lucy Li	450,000

LPGA Tour playoff record (2–0)

No.	Year	Tournament	Opponent	Result
1	2018	Marathon Classic	(United States) Brittany Lincicome	Won with birdie on first extra hole
2	2024	Walmart NW Arkansas Championship	(United States) Lucy Li	Won with eagle on second extra hole

=== Ladies European Tour wins (1) ===
No.	Date	Tournament	Winning score	Margin of victory	Runner-up
1	30 Nov 2013	Hero Women's Indian Open^	−11 (66-74-68=208)	3 strokes	(France) Valentine Derreyl

^ Co-sanctioned by the Ladies Asian Golf Tour.

=== Symetra Tour wins (1) ===
- 2012 Vidalia Championship

=== All Thailand Golf Tour wins (5) ===
- 2008 Singha Pattaya Open (as an amateur)
- 2010 Singha Masters (as an amateur)
- 2011 Singha Pattaya Open, Singha Masters (2012 calendar year)
- 2013 Singha Masters

=== Thai LPGA Tour wins (1) ===
- 2010 (1) 2nd SAT-Thai LPGA Championship (as an amateur)

== Results in LPGA majors ==
Results not in chronological order.

Tournament	2013	2014	2015	2016	2017	2018	2019	2020
Chevron Championship	CUT	T39	73	CUT			CUT	CUT
Women's PGA Championship	CUT	73	T41		CUT	CUT	CUT	T23
U.S. Women's Open	T36		CUT		CUT		70	CUT
The Evian Championship	T57	CUT	T20		CUT	T37	WD	NT
Women's British Open	T66	T51			73	T11	T57	2

Tournament	2021	2022	2023	2024	2025	2026
Chevron Championship	CUT	T53	CUT	CUT	T62	T27
U.S. Women's Open	T35				CUT	CUT
Women's PGA Championship	CUT	CUT	T68	CUT	T71	WD
The Evian Championship	CUT	T43	CUT	T44	T31	
Women's British Open	WD	CUT		CUT		

Top 10
Did not play

CUT = missed the half-way cut
WD = withdrew
NT = no tournament
T = tied

=== Summary ===
Tournament	Wins	2nd	3rd	Top-5	Top-10	Top-25	Events	Cuts made
Chevron Championship	0	0	0	0	0	0	12	5
U.S. Women's Open	0	0	0	0	0	0	8	3
Women's PGA Championship	0	0	0	0	0	1	13	5
The Evian Championship	0	0	0	0	0	1	11	6
Women's British Open	0	1	0	1	1	2	9	6
Totals	0	1	0	1	1	4	53	25

== LPGA Tour career summary ==
Year	Tournaments played	Cuts made *	Wins	2nd	3rd	Top 10s	Best finish	Earnings ($)	Money list rank	Scoring average	Scoring rank
2012	1	1	0	0	0	0	T55	3,633	n/a	72.00	n/a
2013	21	14	0	0	0	1	T8	137,554	73	72.97	92
2014	27	20	0	0	0	1	7	240,214	63	72.30	69
2015	22	11	0	0	0	0	T19	98,337	92	72.84	96
2016	11	6	0	0	0	0	T23	37,955	127	73.12	124
2017	20	11	0	0	0	0	T14	97,715	101	72.12	97
2018	28	22	1	0	0	1	1	491,117	48	71.91	74
2019	31	23	1	0	0	1	1	497,171	42	71.85	90
2020	17	13	0	1	0	1	2	587,829	12	71.69	45
2021	27	17	0	1	0	2	2	383,404	56	71.46	74
2022	27	16	0	0	0	1	T9	225,737	87	71.21	62
2023	25	18	0	0	1	3	T3	565,730	52	70.94	43
2024	30	17	1	0	0	4	1	816,593	49	71.79	80
2025	22	14	0	0	0	0	T27	225,562	100	72.27	113
Totals^	309	203	3	2	1	17	1	4,408,551	117		

^Official as of 2025 season
*Includes matchplay and other tournaments without a cut.

== Team appearances ==
Amateur

- SEA Games (representing Thailand): 2009
- Queen Sirikit Cup (representing Thailand): 2007, 2010

Professional

- Amata Friendship Cup (representing Thailand): 2018 (winners)
- International Crown (representing Thailand): 2025
