= 2014 All Thailand Golf Tour =

Golf tour season

2014 All Thailand Golf Tour season
- Duration: 20 March 2014 – 11 January 2015
- Number of official events: 10
- Most wins: (Thailand) Gunn Charoenkul (2) (Thailand) Prayad Marksaeng (2) (Thailand) Kanphanitnan Muangkhumsakul (2) (Thailand) Chapchai Nirat (2) (Thailand) Parinda Phokan (2)
- Order of Merit (men): (Thailand) Prayad Marksaeng

The 2014 All Thailand Golf Tour, titled as the 2014 Singha All Thailand Golf Tour for sponsorship reasons, was the 16th season of the All Thailand Golf Tour (formerly the TPC Tour), one of the main professional golf tours in Thailand since it was formed in 1999.

== Schedule ==
The following tables list official events during the 2014 season.

=== Men's events ===
Date	Tournament	Location	Purse (฿)	Winner (Note: The number in brackets after each winner's name is the number of All Thailand Golf Tour events they had won up to and including that tournament.)	OWGR points	Other tours (Note: ADT − Asian Development Tour; ASEAN − ASEAN PGA Tour.)
23 Mar	Singha E-San Open	Khon Kaen	3,000,000	(Thailand) Gunn Charoenkul (2)	n/a	ASEAN
13 Apr	Singha Pattaya Open	Chonburi	3,000,000	(Thailand) Prayad Marksaeng (12)	n/a	ASEAN
25 May	Singha Championship	Rayong	2,000,000	(Thailand) Chapchai Nirat (2)	n/a	
22 Jun	Singha Classic	Nakhon Nayok	2,000,000	(Thailand) Sutijet Kooratanapisan (1)	n/a	
20 Jul	Singha Panasonic Hua Hin Open	Prachuap Khiri Khan	2,000,000	(Thailand) Gunn Charoenkul (3)	n/a	ASEAN
3 Aug	Singha Chiang Mai Open	Chiang Mai	2,000,000	(Thailand) Chapchai Nirat (3)	n/a	ASEAN
24 Aug	Singha All Thailand Championship	Khon Kaen	3,000,000	(Thailand) Thaworn Wiratchant (6)	n/a	
2 Nov	Singha Open	Rayong	2,000,000	(Thailand) Pavit Tangkamolprasert (1)	n/a	
28 Dec	Singha All Thailand Grand Final	Khon Kaen	3,000,000	(Thailand) Prayad Marksaeng (13)	n/a	
11 Jan	Boonchu Ruangkit Championship	Nakhon Ratchasima	3,000,000	(Thailand) Phiphatphong Naewsuk (1)	8	ADT

=== Women's events ===
Date	Tournament	Location	Purse (฿)	Winner
23 Mar	Singha E-San Open	Khon Kaen	200,000	(Thailand) Kanphanitnan Muangkhumsakul (3)
13 Apr	Singha Pattaya Open	Chonburi	200,000	(Thailand) Titiya Plucksataporn (2)
25 May	Singha Championship	Rayong	200,000	(Thailand) Supamas Sangchan (a) (1)
22 Jun	Singha Classic	Nakhon Nayok	200,000	(Thailand) Benyapa Niphatsophon (a) (1)
20 Jul	Singha Panasonic Hua Hin Open	Prachuap Khiri Khan	200,000	(Thailand) Tanaporn Kongkiatkrai (4)
3 Aug	Singha Chiangmai Open	Chiang Mai	200,000	(Thailand) Parinda Phokan (a) (2)
24 Aug	Singha All Thailand Championship	Khon Kaen	200,000	(Thailand) Parinda Phokan (a) (3)
2 Nov	Singha Open	Rayong	200,000	(Thailand) Piyathida Ployumsri (1)
28 Dec	Singha All Thailand Grand Final	Khon Kaen	200,000	(Thailand) Kanphanitnan Muangkhumsakul (4)

== Order of Merit ==
The Order of Merit was based on prize money won during the season, calculated in Thai baht.

Position	Player	Prize money (฿)
1	(Thailand) Prayad Marksaeng	1,895,975
2	(Thailand) Chapchai Nirat	1,400,225
3	(Thailand) Gunn Charoenkul	971,883
4	(Thailand) Phiphatphong Naewsuk	861,250
5	(Thailand) Thaworn Wiratchant	834,450
