= 2012 All Thailand Golf Tour =

Golf tour season

2012 All Thailand Golf Tour season
- Duration: 10 May 2012 – 3 February 2013
- Number of official events: 5
- Most wins: (Thailand) Kiradech Aphibarnrat (2)
- Order of Merit (men): (Thailand) Kiradech Aphibarnrat

The 2012 All Thailand Golf Tour, titled as the 2012 Singha All Thailand Golf Tour for sponsorship reasons, was the 14th season of the All Thailand Golf Tour (formerly the TPC Tour), one of the main professional golf tours in Thailand since it was formed in 1999.

== Schedule ==
The following tables list official events during the 2012 season.

=== Men's events ===
Date	Tournament	Location	Purse (฿)	Winner (Note: The number in brackets after each winner's name is the number of All Thailand Golf Tour events they had won up to and including that tournament.)	Other tours (Note: ASEAN − ASEAN PGA Tour.)
13 May	Singha Pattaya Open	Chonburi	2,000,000	(Thailand) Prom Meesawat (5)	ASEAN
22 Jul	Singha All Thailand Championship	Chonburi	2,000,000	(Thailand) Kiradech Aphibarnrat (2)	
19 Aug	Singha E-San Open	Khon Kaen	2,000,000	(Thailand) Gunn Charoenkul (1)	ASEAN
22 Dec	Singha Classic	Nakhon Nayok	2,000,000	(Thailand) Varan Israbhakdi (1)	
3 Feb	Singha Masters	Chiang Rai	4,000,000	(Thailand) Kiradech Aphibarnrat (3)	

=== Women's events ===
Date	Tournament	Location	Purse (฿)	Winner
13 May	Singha Pattaya Open	Chonburi	100,000	(Thailand) Tiranan Yoopan (1)
22 Jul	Singha All Thailand Championship	Chonburi	100,000	(Thailand) Jaruporn Palakawong Na Ayutthaya (1)
19 Aug	Singha E-San Open	Khon Kaen	100,000	(Thailand) Parinda Phokan (a) (1)
22 Dec	Singha Classic	Nakhon Nayok	100,000	(Thailand) Wichanee Meechai (1)
3 Feb	Singha Masters	Chiang Rai	200,000	(Thailand) Thidapa Suwannapura (5)

== Order of Merit ==
The Order of Merit was based on prize money won during the season, calculated in Thai baht.

Position	Player	Prize money (฿)
1	(Thailand) Kiradech Aphibarnrat	900,000
2	(Thailand) Prom Meesawat	471,000
3	(Thailand) Gunn Charoenkul	426,800
4	(South Korea) Baek Sang-hyun	377,700
5	(Thailand) Varan Israbhakdi	330,100
