= 2011 All Thailand Golf Tour =

Golf tour season

2011 All Thailand Golf Tour season
- Duration: 3 February 2011 – 11 March 2012
- Number of official events: 6
- Most wins: (Thailand) Pornanong Phatlum (2) (Thailand) Thidapa Suwannapura (2)
- Order of Merit (men): (Thailand) Prayad Marksaeng

The 2011 All Thailand Golf Tour, titled as the 2011 Singha All Thailand Golf Tour for sponsorship reasons, was the 13th season of the All Thailand Golf Tour (formerly the TPC Tour), one of the main professional golf tours in Thailand since it was formed in 1999.

== Schedule ==
The following tables list official events during the 2011 season.

=== Men's events ===
Date	Tournament	Location	Purse (฿)	Winner (Note: The number in brackets after each winner's name is the number of All Thailand Golf Tour events they had won up to and including that tournament.)	Other tours (Note: ASEAN − ASEAN PGA Tour.)
6 Feb	Singha Masters	Chiang Rai	3,000,000	(South Korea) Kang Min-woong (1)	
8 May	Singha Pattaya Open	Chonburi	1,500,000	(Thailand) Prom Meesawat (4)	ASEAN
2 Jul	Singha E-San Open	Khon Kaen	1,500,000	(Thailand) Udorn Duangdecha (3)	ASEAN
4 Sep	B-Ing TPC Championships	Lopbori	1,500,000	(Thailand) Pijit Petchkasem (1)	
25 Dec	Singha Classic	Nakhon Ratchasima	1,500,000	(Vietnam) Michael Tran (1)	
11 Mar	Singha Masters	Chiang Rai	3,000,000	(Thailand) Prayad Marksaeng (9)	

=== Women's events ===
Date	Tournament	Location	Purse (฿)	Winner
6 Feb	Singha Masters	Chiang Rai	200,000	(Thailand) Pornanong Phatlum (3)
8 May	Singha Pattaya Open	Chonburi	100,000	(Thailand) Thidapa Suwannapura (3)
2 Jul	Singha E-San Open	Khon Kaen	100,000	(Thailand) Patcharajutar Kongkraphan (3)
4 Sep	B-Ing TPC Championships	Lopbori	100,000	(Thailand) Aunchisa Utama (a) (1)
25 Dec	Singha Classic	Nakhon Ratchasima	100,000	(Thailand) Pornanong Phatlum (4)
11 Mar	Singha Masters	Chiang Rai	200,000	(Thailand) Thidapa Suwannapura (4)
