= 2022 All Thailand Golf Tour =

Golf tour season

2022 All Thailand Golf Tour season
- Duration: 27 January 2022 – 20 November 2022
- Number of official events: 12
- Most wins: (Thailand) Settee Prakongvech (2) (Thailand) Atiruj Winaicharoenchai (2)
- Order of Merit: (Thailand) Settee Prakongvech

The 2022 All Thailand Golf Tour was the 24th season of the All Thailand Golf Tour (formerly the TPC Tour), one of the main professional golf tours in Thailand since it was formed in 1999.

== Schedule ==
The following table lists official events during the 2022 season.

Date	Tournament	Location	Purse (฿)	Winner (Note: The number in brackets after each winner's name is the number of All Thailand Golf Tour events they had won up to and including that tournament.)	OWGR points
30 Jan	Boonchu Ruangkit Championship	Nakhon Ratchasima	4,000,000	(Thailand) Settee Prakongvech (3)	5
13 Feb	Singha E-San Open	Khon Kaen	3,000,000	(Thailand) Atiruj Winaicharoenchai (1)	5
10 Apr	Singha All Thailand Memorial	Chanthaburi	3,000,000	(Thailand) Atiruj Winaicharoenchai (2)	5
1 May	Singha Classic	Nakhon Nayok	3,000,000	(Thailand) Varanyu Rattanaphiboonkij (2)	7
29 May	Singha Laguna Phuket Open	Phuket	3,000,000	(Thailand) Witchayanon Chothirunrungrueng (1)	5
26 Jun	Singha All Thailand Premier Championship	Nakhon Pathom	3,000,000	(Thailand) Denwit Boriboonsub (2)	5
24 Jul	Singha Pattaya Open	Chonburi	3,000,000	(Thailand) Settee Prakongvech (4)	5
31 Jul	Singha Championship	Rayong	3,000,000	(Thailand) Gunn Charoenkul (4)	5
21 Aug	Singha Chiang Mai Open	Chiang Mai	3,000,000	(Thailand) Warun Ieamgaew (1)	0.63
4 Sep	Thailand Open	Pathum Thani	8,000,000	(Thailand) Kwanchai Tannin (4)	1.61
16 Oct	Singha Bangkok Open	Pathum Thani	3,000,000	(Thailand) Nitithorn Thippong (1)	1.49
20 Nov	Singha Thailand Masters	Chiang Rai	5,000,000	(Thailand) Poom Saksansin (2)	1.22

== Order of Merit ==
The Order of Merit was based on prize money won during the season, calculated in Thai baht.

Position	Player	Prize money (฿)
1	(Thailand) Settee Prakongvech	1,317,195
2	(Thailand) Varanyu Rattanaphiboonkij	1,268,288
3	(Thailand) Kwanchai Tannin	1,194,291
4	(Thailand) Denwit Boriboonsub	1,137,950
5	(Thailand) Poom Saksansin	1,037,775
