= 1999 TPC Tour =

Golf tour season

1999 TPC Tour season
- Duration: 16 December 1999 – 19 December 1999
- Number of official events: 1

The 1999 TPC Tour was the inaugural season of the TPC Tour, one of the main professional golf tours in Thailand since it was formed in 1999.

== Schedule ==
The following table lists official events during the 1999 season.

Date	Tournament	Location	Purse (฿)	Winner (Note: The number in brackets after each winner's name is the number of All Thailand Golf Tour events they had won up to and including that tournament.)
19 Dec	Singha Masters	Chiang Rai	2,000,000	(Thailand) Prom Meesawat (a) (1)
