= 2001 TPC Tour =

Golf tour season

2001 TPC Tour season
- Duration: 11 January 2001 – 21 October 2001
- Number of official events: 2

The 2001 TPC Tour was the third season of the TPC Tour, one of the main professional golf tours in Thailand since it was formed in 1999.

== Schedule ==
The following table lists official events during the 2001 season.

| Date | Tournament | Location | Purse (฿) | Winner (Note: The number in brackets after each winner's name is the number of All Thailand Golf Tour events they had won up to and including that tournament.) |
|---|---|---|---|---|
| 14 Jan | Singha Masters | Chiang Rai | 2,000,000 | (Thailand) Thammanoon Sriroj (1) |
| 21 Oct | TPC Championships | Samut Prakan | 1,000,000 | (Thailand) Thaworn Wiratchant (1) |
