= 2004 TPC Tour =

Golf tour season

2004 TPC Tour season
- Duration: 14 January 2004 – 13 November 2004
- Number of official events: 6

The 2004 TPC Tour was the sixth season of the TPC Tour, one of the main professional golf tours in Thailand since it was formed in 1999.

== Schedule ==
The following table lists official events during the 2004 season.

Date	Tournament	Location	Purse (฿)	Winner (Note: The number in brackets after each winner's name is the number of All Thailand Golf Tour events they had won up to and including that tournament.)
17 Jan	Singha Masters	Chiang Rai	2,000,000	(Thailand) Prayad Marksaeng (2)
11 Apr	Singha Pattaya Open	Chonburi	1,000,000	(Thailand) Thaworn Wiratchant (3)
20 Jun	Singha Southern Open	Phetchaburi	1,000,000	(Scotland) Simon Yates (2)
16 Jul	Chevrolet Championship	Chonburi	1,000,000	(Thailand) Boonchu Ruangkit (4)
10 Oct	Windsor Open Golf Championship	Chonburi	1,500,000	(Malaysia) Rashid Ismail (1)
13 Nov	Bangkok Airways Open	Bangkok	3,500,000	(United States) Andrew Pitts (1)
