= Sabah Masters =

Professional golf tournament that is held annually in Sabah, Malaysia

Tournament information
- Location: Sabah, Malaysia
- Established: 1982
- Courses: Sutera Harbour Golf and Country Club
- Par: 71
- Length: 6,932 yards (6,339 m)
- Tours: Asian Tour; PGA Tour of Australasia; Asian Development Tour; Asia Golf Circuit; ASEAN PGA Tour
- Format: Stroke play
- Prize fund: US$300,000
- Month played: November
- Final year: 2019

Tournament record score
- Aggregate: 267 Robert Huxtable (1999)
- To par: −21 as above

Final champion
- (Thailand) Pavit Tangkamolprasert
- Location in Malaysia

The Sabah Masters was a professional golf tournament that was held annually in Sabah, Malaysia.

== History ==
First held in the 1982 as part of the Malaysian PGA circuit, the Sabah Masters has formed part of several higher level professional tours. After a sanctioning arrangement with the PGA Tour of Australasia fell through and resulted in no tournament in 1993, the Sabah Masters was an event on the Asia Golf Circuit schedule in 1994 and 1995 before switching to the then fledgling Asian PGA Tour between 1996 and 1999.

After the 1999 tournament, the Sabah Masters was not held again until 2011 when was revived as a fixture on the ASEAN PGA Tour; in 2014 it became the season ending tour championship, with the season promoted as the "Road to Sabah Masters". After a 20 year hiatus from the major tours, it returned as an event on the Asian Tour calendar in 2019.

== Venues ==
Sabah Golf and Country Club played host to the Sabah Masters until 1998 when the Asian PGA decided to inaugurate a rotation policy, with Shan Shui Golf and Country Club hosting that year. Sutera Harbour Golf and Country hosted the tournament in 1999, and has remained as the venue for every renewal since then.

== Winners ==
Year	Tour(s) (Note: ADT − Asian Development Tour; AGC − Asia Golf Circuit; ANZ − PGA Tour of Australasia; ASA − Asian Tour; ASEAN − ASEAN PGA Tour.)	Winner	Score	To par	Margin of victory	Runner(s)-up	Venue	Ref.
Sabah Masters
2019	ASA	(Thailand) Pavit Tangkamolprasert	271	−13	Playoff	(Australia) David Gleeson (Thailand) Phachara Khongwatmai (India) Aman Raj	Sutera Harbour	
2017–18: No tournament
Warisan Harta Sabah Masters
2016	ADT, ASEAN	(Thailand) Namchok Tantipokhakul	277	−11	2 strokes	(United States) Casey O'Toole	Sutera Harbour	
Sabah Masters
2015	ASEAN	(Singapore) Mardan Mamat	274	−10	4 strokes	(Malaysia) Danny Chia (Malaysia) Arie Irawan	Sutera Harbour	
2014	ASEAN	(Thailand) Wisut Artjanawat (2)	276	−8	2 strokes	(Thailand) Sattaya Supupramai (Vietnam) Michael Tran	Sutera Harbour	
2013	ASEAN	(Philippines) Antonio Lascuña	273	−11	Playoff (Note: Lascuña won on the third hole of a sudden-death playoff.)	(Singapore) Mardan Mamat	Sutera Harbour	
2012: No tournament due to rescheduling from November to January								
2011	ASEAN	(Thailand) Wisut Artjanawat	278	−2	1 stroke	(Philippines) Anthony Fernando (Malaysia) Nicholas Fung	Sutera Harbour	
2000–2010: No tournament								
1999	ASA	(United States) Robert Huxtable	267	−21	6 strokes	(Thailand) Thongchai Jaidee	Sutera Harbour	
1998	ASA	(Scotland) Simon Yates	278	−10	1 stroke	(South Africa) Des Terblanche	Shan Shui	
1997	ASA	(South Africa) Des Terblanche	281	−7	Playoff (Note: Terblanche won with a birdie on the third hole of a sudden-death playoff.)	(Thailand) Thammanoon Sriroj	Sabah	
1996	ASA	(Thailand) Thaworn Wiratchant	282	−6	2 strokes	(Taiwan) Lin Chih-chen (Australia) Jeff Wagner	Sabah	
1995	AGC	(United States) Brandt Jobe	280	−8	3 strokes	(Malaysia) Periasamy Gunasegaran	Sabah	
1994	AGC	(United States) Craig McClellan	284	−4	Playoff	(Myanmar) Kyi Hla Han	Sabah	
1993	ANZ	Cancelled						
1992		(Malaysia) Sufian Tan	286	−2	3 strokes	(Taiwan) Lin Keng-chi (New Zealand) Stuart Thomson	Sabah	
1991		(Sri Lanka) Nandasena Perera					Sabah	
1990: No tournament
1989		(Philippines) Frankie Miñoza	278	−10	7 strokes	(Philippines) Eddy Bagtas (Malaysia) N. Ravi Chandran	Sabah	
1988		(Australia) Jeff Senior	283	−5	10 strokes	(Malaysia) Marimuthu Ramayah	Sabah	
1987		(Taiwan) Chen Liang-hsi	284	−4	5 strokes	(Myanmar) Kyi Hla Han	Sabah	
1986		(Philippines) Mario Siodina					Sabah	
1985		(Philippines) Eleuterio Nival					Sabah	
1984		(Philippines) Paterno Braza	291		1 stroke	(Taiwan) Hung Weng-neng	Sabah	
1983							Sabah	
1982		(Thailand) Archin Sopon	290	+2	Playoff (Note: Sopon won on the second hole of a sudden-death playoff.)	(Philippines) Mario Siodina	Sabah	
