= Prom Meesawat =

Thai professional golfer

Personal information
- Nickname: Big Dolphin
- Nationality: Thailand
- Born: 21 July 1984 (age 42)
- Height: 1.87 m (6 ft 2 in)
- Weight: 80 kg (176 lb; 12 st 8 lb)

Career
- Sport: Golf
- Turned professional: 2004
- Current tours: Asian Tour; All Thailand Golf Tour
- Former tours: European Tour; Japan Golf Tour; Challenge Tour
- Professional wins: 12

Number of wins by tour
- Asian Tour: 2
- Other: 10

Best results in major championships
- Masters Tournament: DNP
- PGA Championship: DNP
- U.S. Open: DNP
- The Open Championship: CUT: 2011, 2019
Medal record
Southeast Asian Games
Silver medal – second place	2001 Kuala Lumpur	Men's team

Prom Meesawat (born 21 July 1984) is a Thai professional golfer. He won his age group at the World Junior Golf Championships in 1997 and 2002 and was Asia Pacific Junior Champion several times. He won the Thailand Open Amateur Championship in 2001, 2002 and 2003 and was victorious in a professional tournament as a fifteen-year-old amateur.

== Professional career ==
Meesawat turned professional in 2004 and joined the Asian Tour. In 2005 he had five top ten finishes on Asian Tour and won a professional event in Thai circuit. His first Asian Tour win came at the 2006 SK Telecom Open in South Korea.

In 2012 a string of good results in Asian Tour events that were co-sanctioned with the European Tour earned Meesawat full playing rights on the European Tour for 2013. He lost his European Tour card in 2015 and returned to the Asian Tour full-time. In January 2019, Messawat qualified for the 2019 Open Championship with a top-4 finish at the SMBC Singapore Open.

== Professional wins (12) ==
=== Asian Tour wins (2) ===
No.	Date	Tournament	Winning score	Margin of victory	Runner(s)-up
1	7 May 2006	SK Telecom Open^{1}	−15 (69-64-68=201) (Note: Shortened to 54 holes due to weather.)	3 strokes	(South Korea) Lee Seong-ho, (India) Jeev Milkha Singh
2	16 Nov 2014	Yeangder Tournament Players Championship	−11 (67-73-68-69=277)	Playoff	(Philippines) Miguel Tabuena

^{1}Co-sanctioned by the Korean Tour

Asian Tour playoff record (1–4)

No.	Year	Tournament	Opponent(s)	Result
1	2006	Crowne Plaza Open	(Taiwan) Lin Wen-tang, (Thailand) Chinnarat Phadungsil	Phadungsil won with par on second extra hole Lin eliminated by par on first hole
2	2012	SAIL-SBI Open	(India) Anirban Lahiri	Lost after concession on first extra hole
3	2013	Resorts World Manila Masters	(China) Liang Wenchong	Lost to birdie on first extra hole
4	2013	Hong Kong Open	(Spain) Miguel Ángel Jiménez, (Wales) Stuart Manley	Jiménez won with birdie on first extra hole
5	2014	Yeangder Tournament Players Championship	(Philippines) Miguel Tabuena	Won with par on second extra hole

=== Asian Development Tour wins (1) ===
No.	Date	Tournament	Winning score	Margin of victory	Runner-up
1	27 Apr 2019	Butra Heidelberg Cement Brunei Championships	−20 (66-68-62-64=260)	Playoff	(Japan) Naoki Sekito

=== All Thailand Golf Tour wins (7) ===
No.	Date	Tournament	Winning score	Margin of victory	Runner(s)-up
1	19 Dec 1999	Singha Masters (as an amateur)			
2	27 Aug 2005	TPC Tour Championships	−17 (65-65-66-67=263)	4 strokes	(Thailand) Chapchai Nirat
3	1 Apr 2006	Singha Pattaya Open	−12 (67-67-66-72=272)	2 strokes	(Thailand) Thammanoon Sriroj
4	8 May 2011	Singha Pattaya Open^{1} (2)	−20 (70-62-68-68=268)	9 strokes	(Thailand) Atthaphon Prathummanee, (Thailand) Thammanoon Sriroj
5	13 May 2012	Singha Pattaya Open^{1} (3)	−14 (67-70-67-70=274)	3 strokes	(Thailand) Thanyakon Khrongpha
6	10 Mar 2019	Singha Thailand Masters	−12 (70-67-67-72=276)	1 stroke	(Thailand) Sarit Suwannarut
7	16 Aug 2020	Singha Pattaya Open (4)	−20 (68-65-64-63=260)	5 strokes	(Thailand) Gunn Charoenkul, (Thailand) Tanapat Pichaikool

^{1}Co-sanctioned by the ASEAN PGA Tour

=== TrustGolf Tour wins (2) ===
No.	Date	Tournament	Winning score	Margin of victory	Runner-up
1	17 Apr 2021	Thailand Mixed #2	−16 (68-66-66=200) (Note: Shortened to 54 holes due to COVID-19 restrictions.)	Shared title with (Thailand) Chapchai Nirat	
2	19 Nov 2021	Thailand Mixed #4	−23 (69-67-64-65=265)	4 strokes	(Thailand) Sadom Kaewkanjana

== Playoff record ==
European Tour playoff record (0–1)

No.	Year	Tournament	Opponents	Result
1	2013	Hong Kong Open	(Spain) Miguel Ángel Jiménez, (Wales) Stuart Manley	Jiménez won with birdie on first extra hole

Challenge Tour playoff record (0–1)

No.	Year	Tournament	Opponents	Result
1	2015	SSE Scottish Hydro Challenge	(England) Robert Coles, (England) Jack Senior	Senior won with birdie on fourth extra hole

OneAsia Tour playoff record (0–1)

No.	Year	Tournament	Opponent	Result
1	2018	Solaire Philippine Open	(Philippines) Miguel Tabuena	Lost after concession on first extra hole

== Results in major championships ==
Tournament	2011	2012	2013	2014	2015	2016	2017	2018	2019
The Open Championship	CUT								CUT

Did not play

CUT = missed the halfway cut
Note: Meesawat only played in The Open Championship.

== Results in World Golf Championships ==
Tournament	2007	2008	2009	2010	2011	2012
Match Play						
Championship	T68					
Invitational						
Champions						T11

Did not play

"T" = Tied
Note that the HSBC Champions did not become a WGC event until 2009.

== Team appearances ==
Amateur

- Eisenhower Trophy (representing Thailand): 2002
- Bonallack Trophy (representing Asia/Pacific): 2002 (winners)

Professional

- Royal Trophy (representing Asia): 2007
- World Cup (representing Thailand): 2018
- Amata Friendship Cup (representing Thailand): 2018 (winners)
