= 2008 All Thailand Golf Tour =

Golf tour season

2008 All Thailand Golf Tour season
- Duration: 27 March 2008 – 7 September 2008
- Number of official events: 3
- Order of Merit (men): (Thailand) Prayad Marksaeng

The 2008 All Thailand Golf Tour was the 10th season of the All Thailand Golf Tour (formerly the TPC Tour), one of the main professional golf tours in Thailand since it was formed in 1999.

== Schedule ==
The following tables list official events during the 2008 season.

=== Men's events ===
Date	Tournament	Location	Purse (฿)	Winner (Note: The number in brackets after each winner's name is the number of All Thailand Golf Tour events they had won up to and including that tournament.)	Other tours (Note: ASEAN − ASEAN PGA Tour.)
30 Mar	Singha Masters	Chiang Rai	2,000,000	(Thailand) Prayad Marksaeng (6)	
23 Apr	Singha Pattaya Open	Chonburi	1,500,000	(Thailand) Kritsada Rangwat (1)	
7 Sep	B-Ing TPC Championships	Chonburi	1,600,000	(Philippines) Felix Casas (1)	ASEAN

=== Women's events ===
Date	Tournament	Location	Purse (฿)	Winner
23 Apr	Singha Pattaya Open	Chonburi	100,000	(Thailand) Thidapa Suwannapura (a) (1)

== Order of Merit ==
The Order of Merit was based on prize money won during the season, calculated in Thai baht.

Position	Player	Prize money (฿)
1	(Thailand) Prayad Marksaeng	300,000
2	(Thailand) Krisada Rangwat	261,650
3	(Japan) Yoshinobu Tsukada	181,000
4	(Thailand) Udorn Duangdecha	171,000
5	(Scotland) Simon Yates	140,000
