= 2000 TPC Tour =

Golf tour season

2000 TPC Tour season
- Duration: 13 January 2000 – 22 October 2000
- Number of official events: 2

The 2000 TPC Tour was the second season of the TPC Tour, one of the main professional golf tours in Thailand since it was formed in 1999.

== Schedule ==
The following table lists official events during the 2000 season.

Date	Tournament	Location	Purse (฿)	Winner (Note: The number in brackets after each winner's name is the number of All Thailand Golf Tour events they had won up to and including that tournament.)
16 Jan	Singha Masters	Chiang Rai	2,000,000	(Thailand) Prayad Marksaeng (1)
22 Oct	TPC Championships	Samut Prakan	1,000,000	(Thailand) Boonchu Ruangkit (1)
