= 2015 All Thailand Golf Tour =

Golf tour season

2015 All Thailand Golf Tour season
- Duration: 26 February 2015 – 15 February 2016
- Number of official events: 12
- Most wins: (Thailand) Prayad Marksaeng (3)
- Order of Merit (men): (Thailand) Prayad Marksaeng

The 2015 All Thailand Golf Tour, titled as the 2015 Singha All Thailand Golf Tour for sponsorship reasons, was the 17th season of the All Thailand Golf Tour (formerly the TPC Tour), one of the main professional golf tours in Thailand since it was formed in 1999.

== Schedule ==
The following tables list official events during the 2015 season.

=== Men's events ===
Date	Tournament	Location	Purse (฿)	Winner (Note: The number in brackets after each winner's name is the number of All Thailand Golf Tour events they had won up to and including that tournament.)	OWGR points	Other tours (Note: ADT − Asian Development Tour; ASEAN − ASEAN PGA Tour.)
1 Mar	Singha E-San Open	Khon Kaen	3,000,000	(Thailand) Thaworn Wiratchant (7)	n/a	ASEAN
29 Mar	Singha Pattaya Open	Chonburi	3,000,000	(Thailand) Prayad Marksaeng (14)	n/a	ASEAN
12 Apr	Singha Classic	Nakhon Nayok	2,000,000	(Thailand) Kosuke Hamamoto (a) (1)	n/a	
3 May	Singha Championship	Rayong	2,000,000	(Thailand) Itthipat Buranatanyarat (1)	n/a	
24 May	Singha All Thailand Championship	Chonburi	3,000,000	(Thailand) Rattanon Wannasrichan (1)	n/a	
28 Jun	Singha Open	Chonburi	2,000,000	(Thailand) Chinnarat Phadungsil (1)	n/a	
19 Jul	Singha Panasonic Hua Hin Open	Prachuap Khiri Khan	2,000,000	(Thailand) Pawin Ingkhapradit (1)	n/a	ASEAN
9 Aug	Singha Chiang Mai Open	Chiang Mai	3,000,000	(Thailand) Prayad Marksaeng (15)	n/a	ASEAN
13 Sep	Thongchai Jaidee Foundation	Prachuap Khiri Khan	4,000,000	(Thailand) Kiradech Aphibarnrat (4)	11	ADT
1 Nov	All Thailand Premier Championship	Khon Kaen	3,000,000	(Thailand) Rattanon Wannasrichan (2)	n/a	
27 Dec	Boonchu Ruangkit Championship	Nakhon Ratchasima	3,000,000	(Thailand) Phachara Khongwatmai (2)	14	ADT
15 Feb	Singha Masters	Chiang Rai	5,000,000	(Thailand) Prayad Marksaeng (16)	n/a	

=== Women's events ===
Date	Tournament	Location	Purse (฿)	Winner
1 Mar	Singha E-San Open	Khon Kaen	200,000	(Thailand) Pannarat Thanapolboonyaras (a) (1)
29 Mar	Singha Pattaya Open	Chonburi	200,000	(Thailand) Kanphanitnan Muangkhumsakul (5)
12 Apr	Singha Classic	Nakhon Nayok	200,000	(Thailand) Kanyalak Preedasuttijit (a) (1)
3 May	Singha Championship	Rayong	200,000	(Thailand) Manuschaya Zeemakorn (a) (1)
24 May	Singha All Thailand Championship	Chonburi	200,000	(Thailand) Kanphanitnan Muangkhumsakul (6)
28 Jun	Singha Open	Chonburi	200,000	(Thailand) Saranporn Langkulgasettrin (1)
19 Jul	Singha Panasonic Hua Hin Open	Prachuap Khiri Khan	200,000	(Thailand) Chorphaka Jaengkit (1)
9 Aug	Singha Chiangmai Open	Chiang Mai	200,000	(Thailand) Renuka Suksukont (1)
1 Nov	All Thailand Premier Championship	Khon Kaen	200,000	(Thailand) Saranporn Langkulgasettrin (2)
15 Feb	Singha Masters	Chiang Rai	300,000	(Thailand) Benyapa Niphatsophon (a) (2)

== Order of Merit ==
The Order of Merit was based on prize money won during the season, calculated in Thai baht.

Position	Player	Prize money (฿)
1	(Thailand) Prayad Marksaeng	2,190,217
2	(Thailand) Phachara Khongwatmai	1,336,229
3	(Thailand) Rattanon Wannasrichan	1,318,983
4	(Thailand) Piya Swangarunporn	923,583
5	(Thailand) Chinnarat Phadungsil	831,308
