= 2020 All Thailand Golf Tour =

Golf tour season

2020 All Thailand Golf Tour season
- Duration: 23 January 2020 – 15 November 2020
- Number of official events: 6 (Note: A further six tournaments were scheduled but were cancelled.)
- Order of Merit: (Thailand) Pavit Tangkamolprasert

The 2020 All Thailand Golf Tour was the 22nd season of the All Thailand Golf Tour (formerly the TPC Tour), one of the main professional golf tours in Thailand since it was formed in 1999.

== Schedule ==
The following table lists official events during the 2020 season.

Date	Tournament	Location	Purse (฿)	Winner (Note: The number in brackets after each winner's name is the number of All Thailand Golf Tour events they had won up to and including that tournament.)	OWGR points	Other tours (Note: ADT − Asian Development Tour.)
26 Jan	Boonchu Ruangkit Championship	Nakhon Ratchasima	4,000,000	(Thailand) Pavit Tangkamolprasert (3)	7	ADT
9 Feb	Singha E-San Open	Khon Kaen	3,000,000	(Thailand) Phachara Khongwatmai (5)	5	
~~26 Apr~~	Singha Championship	Rayong	–	Cancelled	–	
~~31 May~~	Singha All Thailand Championship	Phuket	–	Cancelled	–	
~~14 Jun~~	Singha Classic	Nakhon Nayok	–	Cancelled	–	
12 Jul; ~~5 Apr~~	Thongchai Jaidee Foundation	Lopburi	4,000,000	(Thailand) Thaworn Wiratchant (8)	7	
~~19 Jul~~	Singha Chiang Mai Open	Chiang Mai	–	Cancelled	–	
16 Aug; ~~6 Sep~~	Singha Pattaya Open	Chonburi	3,000,000	(Thailand) Prom Meesawat (7)	7	
~~23 Aug~~	Singha All Thailand Memorial	Chanthaburi	–	Cancelled	–	
20 Sep; ~~12 Apr~~	Singha Thailand Masters	Chiang Rai	5,000,000	(Thailand) Ratchapol Jantavara (1)	5	
18 Oct; ~~17 May~~	Singha Laguna Phuket Open	Phuket	2,000,000	(Thailand) Pawin Ingkhapradit (3)	5	
~~15 Nov~~; ~~25 Oct~~	BG Bangkok Open	Nakhon Nayok	–	Cancelled	–	

== Order of Merit ==
The Order of Merit was based on prize money won during the season, calculated in Thai baht.

Position	Player	Prize money (฿)
1	(Thailand) Pavit Tangkamolprasert	879,755
2	(Thailand) Ratchapol Jantavara	830,687
3	(Thailand) Thaworn Wiratchant	712,489
4	(Thailand) Prom Meesawat	651,934
5	(Thailand) Phachara Khongwatmai	555,183
