= Chawalit Plaphol =

Thai golfer (born 1974)

Personal information
- Nationality: Thailand
- Born: 30 August 1974 (age 52)
- Height: 1.78 m (5 ft 10 in)

Career
- Sport: Golf
- Turned professional: 1996
- Current tour: Asian Tour
- Professional wins: 11

Number of wins by tour
- Japan Golf Tour: 1
- Asian Tour: 4
- Other: 6

Chawalit Plaphol (born 30 August 1974) is a Thai golfer.

== Early life and amateur career ==
He took up golf at the age of twelve and won team and individual gold medals for Thailand at the 1995 South East Asian Games.

== Professional career ==
In 1996, Plaphol turned professional. He has been a regular competitor on the Asian Tour since that year. He has won two Asian Tour events and in 2005 he achieved a career best order of merit placing of seventh. He also plays on the Japan Golf Tour, on which he was victorious in the 2004 ANA Open. He represented Thailand in the 2000 WGC-World Cup alongside his cousin Thammanoon Sriroj.

== Amateur wins ==
- 1995 South East Asian Games (individual and team)

== Professional wins (11) ==
=== Japan Golf Tour wins (1) ===
No.	Date	Tournament	Winning score	Margin of victory	Runner-up
1	19 Sep 2004	ANA Open	−17 (66-65-70-70=271)	1 stroke	(South Korea) Yang Yong-eun

Japan Golf Tour playoff record (0–1)

No.	Year	Tournament	Opponents	Result
1	2007	ANA Open	(Japan) Yasuharu Imano, (Japan) Norio Shinozaki	Shinozaki won with par on fifth extra hole Imano eliminated by par on first hole

=== Asian Tour wins (4) ===
No.	Date	Tournament	Winning score	Margin of victory	Runner-up
1	5 Apr 1998	China Orient Masters	−10 (71-71-67-69=278)	5 strokes	(Thailand) Boonchu Ruangkit
2	11 Jun 2006	Bangkok Airways Open	−3 (71-70-73-67=281)	Playoff	(Canada) Rick Gibson
3	19 Jun 2011	Queen's Cup	−11 (70-67-68-68=273)	2 strokes	(Thailand) Prayad Marksaeng
4	24 Feb 2013	Zaykabar Myanmar Open	−18 (67-66-68-69=270)	1 stroke	(Sri Lanka) Mithun Perera

Asian Tour playoff record (1–0)

No.	Year	Tournament	Opponent	Result
1	2006	Bangkok Airways Open	(Canada) Rick Gibson	Won with par on first extra hole

=== All Thailand Golf Tour wins (2) ===
- 2005 Chevrolet Championship
- 2013 Singha All Thailand Grand Final

=== ASEAN PGA Tour wins (2) ===
No.	Date	Tournament	Winning score	Margin of victory	Runner(s)-up
1	26 Jun 2010	ICTSI Mount Malarayat Championship	−22 (65-64-69-68=266)	8 strokes	(Philippines) Juvic Pagunsan
2	14 Aug 2010	Mercedes-Benz Masters Singapore	−17 (67-68-66-70=271)	5 strokes	(Singapore) Lam Chih Bing, (Thailand) Panuphol Pittayarat

=== Thailand PGA Tour wins (1) ===
No.	Date	Tournament	Winning score	Margin of victory	Runner-up
1	26 Aug 2018	Singha-SAT Lamphun Classic	−15 (68-68-65-68=269)	2 strokes	(Thailand) Settee Prakongvech

=== Other wins (1) ===
- 1998 Hugo Boss Foursomes (China; with Jim Rutledge)

== Team appearances ==
- World Cup (representing Thailand): 2000
