= Wisut Artjanawat =

Thai professional golfer

Personal information
- Nationality: Thailand
- Born: 10 March 1986 (age 40) Thailand
- Height: 5 ft 6 in (1.68 m)

Career
- Sport: Golf
- Turned professional: 2008
- Current tour: Asian Development Tour
- Former tour: Asian Tour
- Professional wins: 7

Achievements and awards
- ASEAN PGA Tour Order of Merit winner: 2011
Medal record
Southeast Asian Games
Silver medal – second place	2001 Kuala Lumpur	Men's team
Bronze medal – third place	2001 Kuala Lumpur	Individual

Wisut Artjanawat (born 10 March 1986) is a Thai professional golfer who currently plays on the Asian Development Tour having previously competed on the Asian Tour

== Amateur career ==
Artjanawat played for Thailand in the 2002 Asian Games, finishing tied for 29th in the individual event and seventh in the team event.

== Professional career ==
After turning professional in 2008, Artjanawat played on the Asian Tour but failed to achieve much success finishing outside the top-70 in each of his three seasons on the tour. Since 2008, Artjanawat has also regularly played on the ASEAN PGA Tour and has had five victories on this tour and finished in the top-10 on the Order of Merit every year from 2008 to 2013 (1st, 4th, 4th, 1st, 6th, 3rd).

In 2014, Artjanawat won his first Official World Golf Ranking points event at the PGM Sime Darby Harvard Championship on the Asian Development Tour, and attributed the win to a healthier lifestyle having taken up cycling.

== Professional wins (7) ==
=== Asian Development Tour wins (1) ===
No.	Date	Tournament	Winning score	Margin of victory	Runner-up
1	1 Mar 2014	PGM Sime Darby Harvard Championship^{1}	−22 (69-65-65-67=266)	1 stroke	(Malaysia) R. Nachimuthu

^{1}Co-sanctioned by the Professional Golf of Malaysia Tour

=== ASEAN PGA Tour wins (5) ===
No.	Date	Tournament	Winning score	Margin of victory	Runner(s)-up
1	25 May 2008	Mercedes-Benz Masters Philippines	−19 (66-68-69-66=269)	2 strokes	(Philippines) Mars Pucay, (Philippines) Angelo Que
2	23 Nov 2008	Mercedes-Benz Masters Vietnam	−8 (76-67-72-65=280)	4 strokes	(Philippines) Michael Bibat, (Philippines) Marvin Dumandan
3	16 Oct 2011	Palembang Musi Championship	−17 (71-68-66-66=271)	5 strokes	(Malaysia) Nicholas Fung
4	6 Nov 2011	Sabah Masters	−2 (72-68-72-66=278)	1 stroke	(Philippines) Anthony Fernando, (Malaysia) Nicholas Fung
5	10 Jan 2014 (2013 season)	Sabah Masters (2)	−8 (69-74-65-68=276)	2 strokes	(Thailand) Sattaya Supupramai, (Vietnam) Michael Tran

=== PGT Asia wins (1) ===
No.	Date	Tournament	Winning score	Margin of victory	Runner-up
1	26 May 2019	Daan Open^{1}	−14 (67-73-67-67=274)	2 strokes	(Taiwan) Chung Sung-mao

^{1}Co-sanctioned by the Taiwan PGA Tour

== Team appearances ==
Amateur

- Eisenhower Trophy (representing Thailand): 2002
