= Thanita Muangkhumsakul =

Thai professional golfer

Personal information
- Nickname: Mind
- Nationality: Thailand
- Born: 13 December 1998 (age 27) Khon Kaen, Thailand
- Height: 172 cm (5 ft 8 in)

Career
- Sport: Golf
- Turned professional: 2013
- Current tour: Thai LPGA Tour
- Former tours: LPGA Tour; Epson Tour
- Professional wins: 13

Achievements and awards
- Thai LPGA Tour Order of Merit: 2014

Thanita "Mind" Muangkhumsakul (Thai: ฐานิตา เมืองคำสกุล; born Kanphanitnan Muangkhumsakul (Thai: กานต์พนิตนันท์ เมืองคำสกุล), 13 December 1998) is a Thai professional golfer.

== Early life ==
Muangkhumsakul was born on 13 December 1998 in Khon Kaen, Thailand. She started playing golf at the age of five.

== Professional career ==
Muangkhumsakul turned professional in 2013 when she was just 14 years old. In 2014, she capture her first career international win at the Party Golfers Ladies Open on the Taiwan LPGA Tour. She made her first career appearance on the LPGA Tour at the Sime Darby LPGA Malaysia at the Kuala Lumpur Golf & Country Club in October, after winning a 12-player wild card playoff at the same venue.

In 2016, she won her second Taiwan LPGA Tour title at the Hitachi Ladies Classic.

In 2017, she claimed her third Taiwan LPGA Tour victory at the ICTSI Champion Tour at Splendido. In December, she finished tied for 21st at the final stage LPGA Qualifying Tournament to earn LPGA membership for the 2018 season. In 2018, she played five events and made one cut on the LPGA Tour.

In 2019, she played on the Symetra Tour and made 14 cuts in 16 starts with 9 top-15 performances. She finished the season with the tenth place on the Symetra Tour money list and earn LPGA Tour status for the 2020 season.

== Amateur wins ==
- 2012 Asia Pacific Junior, TGA-CAT Junior Ranking #1

== Professional wins (13) ==
=== Taiwan LPGA Tour wins (3) ===
No.	Date	Tournament	Winning score	Margin of victory	Runner(s)-up
1	25 Sep 2014	Party Golfers Ladies Open^{1}	−7 (70-68-71=209)	3 strokes	(Taiwan) Pei-Yun Chien
2	10 Jan 2017	Hitachi Ladies Classic	−10 (69-71-66=206)	3 strokes	(Taiwan) Ssu-Chia Cheng, (Thailand) Pornanong Phatlum
3	10 Mar 2017	ICTSI Champion Tour at Splendido	−1 (69-77-69=216)	2 strokes	(Philippines) Pauline Del Rosario, (Thailand) Titiya Plucksataporn

^{1}Co-sanctioned by the Ladies Asian Golf Tour.

=== Thai LPGA Tour wins (4) ===
- 2013 (1) 5th Singha-SAT Thai LPGA Championship
- 2015 (1) 4th Singha-SAT Thai LPGA Championship
- 2016 (1) 1st Singha-SAT Thai LPGA Championship
- 2025 (1) Singha-SAT Nakhon Ratchasima Ladies Championship

=== All Thailand Golf Tour wins (6) ===
- 2013 (2) Singha E-San Open, Singha Bangkok Open
- 2014 (2) Singha E-San Open, Singha All Thailand Grand Final
- 2015 (2) Singha Pattaya Open, Singha All Thailand Championship
