= Chapchai Nirat =

Thai professional golfer (born 1983)

Personal information
- Nationality: Thailand
- Born: 5 June 1983 (age 43) Bangkok, Thailand
- Height: 1.73 m (5 ft 8 in)

Career
- Sport: Golf
- Turned professional: 1998
- Current tours: Asian Tour; All Thailand Golf Tour
- Former tour: European Tour
- Professional wins: 11

Number of wins by tour
- European Tour: 1
- Asian Tour: 4
- Other: 7

Chapchai Nirat (Thai: ชัพชัย นิราช; born 5 June 1983) is a Thai professional golfer.

== Career ==
Chapchai is the son of a Thai national team golfer, and turned professional in 1998 as a fifteen-year-old. He won for the first time as a pro at the 2004 Genting Masters in Malaysia. He joined the Asian Tour in 2005, and had a second-place finish in his rookie season. In 2007 he won the TCL Classic, which is co-sanctioned by the Asian Tour and the European Tour and the Hana Bank Vietnam Masters. He was the third Thai to win a European Tour event.

In March 2009, Nirat shot 32-under-par over 72 holes to claim the SAIL Open, setting a new Asian Tour record for the best 72-hole score.

== Professional wins (11) ==
=== European Tour wins (1) ===
No.	Date	Tournament	Winning score	Margin of victory	Runner-up
1	18 Mar 2007	TCL Classic^{1}	−22 (61-66-68-71=266)	3 strokes	(Argentina) Rafael Echenique

^{1}Co-sanctioned by the Asian Tour

=== Asian Tour wins (4) ===
No.	Date	Tournament	Winning score	Margin of victory	Runner(s)-up
1	18 Mar 2007	TCL Classic^{1}	−22 (61-66-68-71=266)	3 strokes	(Argentina) Rafael Echenique
2	25 Nov 2007	Hana Bank Vietnam Masters	−12 (68-71-70-67=276)	2 strokes	(England) Simon Griffiths, (Thailand) Chawalit Plaphol
3	21 Mar 2009	SAIL Open	−32 (62-62-65-67=256)	11 strokes	(India) Gaganjeet Bhullar, (Australia) Richard Moir
4	21 Sep 2014	Worldwide Holdings Selangor Masters	−10 (68-69-69-68=274)	Playoff	(Philippines) Antonio Lascuña

^{1}Co-sanctioned by the European Tour

Asian Tour playoff record (1–1)

No.	Year	Tournament	Opponent	Result
1	2014	Worldwide Holdings Selangor Masters	(Philippines) Antonio Lascuña	Won with par on first extra hole
2	2015	CIMB Niaga Indonesian Masters	(England) Lee Westwood	Lost to birdie on first extra hole

=== Asian Development Tour wins (1) ===
No.	Date	Tournament	Winning score	Margin of victory	Runner-up
1	4 Dec 2016	ADT Thongchai Jaidee Foundation^{1}	−12 (73-71-67-65=276)	6 strokes	(Thailand) Sorachut Hansapiban

^{1}Co-sanctioned by the All Thailand Golf Tour

=== All Thailand Golf Tour wins (4) ===
No.	Date	Tournament	Winning score	Margin of victory	Runner-up
1	7 Apr 2007	Singha Pattaya Open			
2	25 May 2014	Singha Championship	−14 (69-67-71-67=274)	2 strokes	(Thailand) Thitiphun Chuayprakong
3	3 Aug 2014	Singha Chiang Mai Open^{1}	−23 (65-67-65-64=261)	2 strokes	(Thailand) Pipatpong Naewsuk
4	4 Dec 2016	ADT Thongchai Jaidee Foundation^{2}	−12 (73-71-67-65=276)	6 strokes	(Thailand) Sorachut Hansapiban

^{1}Co-sanctioned by the ASEAN PGA Tour
^{2}Co-sanctioned by the Asian Development Tour

=== Thailand PGA Tour wins (1) ===
No.	Date	Tournament	Winning score	Margin of victory	Runner-up
1	22 Sep 2018	Singha-SAT Kanchanaburi Championship	−13 (67-67-66-67=267)	3 strokes	(Thailand) Chonlatit Chuenboonngam

=== TrustGolf Tour wins (1) ===
No.	Date	Tournament	Winning score	Margin of victory	Runner-up
1	17 Apr 2021	Thailand Mixed#2	−16 (66-68-66=200) (Note: Shortened to 54 holes due to COVID-19 restrictions.)	Shared title with (Thailand) Prom Meesawat	

=== Other wins (1) ===
- 2004 Genting Masters (Malaysia)

== Results in World Golf Championships ==
Tournament	2008	2009
Match Play		
Championship	T61	
Invitational		
Champions		T33

Did not play

"T" = Tied
Note that the HSBC Champions did not become a WGC event until 2009.
