= Junior World Golf Championships =

Golf tournament

Uswing Mojing Junior World Golf Championships
Tournament information
- Location: San Diego, California, United States
- Course(s): Various, including Torrey Pines Golf Course
- Tour: Junior golf
- Format: Stroke play
- Month played: July
- Defunct: No

The Uswing Mojing Junior World Golf Championships are held in San Diego, California, United States, each year, currently in July, and conducted by the San Diego Junior Golf Association. They include tournaments for six age groups ranging from under-6 to 15–17 and for both sexes. Each age group plays at a separate course, ranging from a par-3 course for the youngest to Torrey Pines for the 15–17s, which is also the venue for the Farmers Insurance Open on the PGA Tour and the site of the 2008 U.S. Open.

== History ==
The event was founded in 1968. The inaugural tournament numbered 475 entrants from 20 U.S. States and six other countries. By 2003, there were 1,040 participants from 43 U.S. states and 45 other countries. Qualifying events are held in the U.S. and elsewhere. However, European golf has largely opted out of participation; of around 30 countries that hold qualifying events, the British Junior Golf Tour in the UK offers qualifying events in Europe. In 2005, the top ten of the 15–17 boys' and girls' tournaments featured golfers from ten countries between them. The most notable trend in the results in recent years is a dramatic increase in the number of wins and top-ten finishes by boys and girls from East Asia. This trend has already translated to the LPGA Tour level, but not so much onto the PGA Tour.

Beginning with the 2025 event, Uswing Mojing became the event's title sponsor.

Colina Park Golf Course hosts the under-6 to 9–10 age groups of the Uswing Mojing Junior World Golf Championships. It is an 18-hole par-3 course located in City Heights, San Diego, California operated by Pro Kids Golf Academy.

Past boys' champions include Notah Begay III, Ernie Els, Phil Mickelson, Corey Pavin, Nick Price, Craig Stadler, David Toms, Jason Day and Tiger Woods. 1984 was a vintage year, with Toms winning the 15–17 event, Els winning the 13–14s (with Mickelson finishing second), and Woods winning the 9–10s (despite still being age 8). Tiger Woods has won 6 of these championships more than any other golfer.

Past girls' champions include Amy Alcott, Brandie Burton, Lorena Ochoa, and Jennifer Rosales.
