= Thanyakon Khrongpha =

Thai professional golfer

Personal information
- Nationality: Thailand
- Born: 3 June 1990 (age 36)
- Height: 1.66 m (5 ft 5 in)
- Weight: 65 kg (143 lb; 10.2 st)

Career
- Sport: Golf
- Turned professional: 2010
- Current tours: Japan Golf Tour; Asian Tour
- Professional wins: 10

Number of wins by tour
- Japan Golf Tour: 1
- Other: 9
Medal record
Southeast Asian Games
Gold medal – first place	2007 Nakhon Ratchasima	Men's team
Gold medal – first place	2009 Vientiane	Men's team

Thanyakon Khrongpha (Some sources Thanyakorn) (Thai: ธันยากร ครองผา; born 3 June 1990) is a Thai professional golfer.

== Career ==
Khrongpha was a successful amateur, winning gold at the Southeast Asian Games, before turning professional in 2010. He promptly won his first professional tournament on the Asian Development Tour at the Kariza Classic in Indonesia. At the end of the year Khrongpha came through the qualifying school to earn a card for the full Asian Tour.

In his first season on the main tour, Khrongpha made 13 of 14 cuts and finished 52nd on the Order of Merit, enough to retain his card for 2012.

== Professional wins (10) ==
=== Japan Golf Tour wins (1) ===
No.	Date	Tournament	Winning score	Margin of victory	Runner-up
1	9 Sep 2018	ISPS Handa Match Play	2 and 1		(Japan) Shugo Imahira

=== Asian Development Tour wins (1) ===
No.	Date	Tournament	Winning score	Margin of victory	Runner-up
1	24 Sep 2010	Kariza Classic	−13 (69-69-71-66=275)	1 stroke	(Indonesia) Rory Hie

=== All Thailand Golf Tour wins (3) ===
No.	Date	Tournament	Winning score	Margin of victory	Runner-up
1	11 Sep 2016	Singha Panasonic All Thailand Championship	−18 (66-66-68-66=266)	3 strokes	(Venezuela) Wolmer Murillo
2	22 Jul 2018	Singha All Thailand Championship (2)	−13 (63-68-64-72=267)	4 strokes	(Thailand) Rattanon Wannasrichan
3	7 Sep 2025	Singha Bangkok Open^{1}	−20 (63-64-69-64=260)	Playoff	(Thailand) Amarin Kraivixien

^{1}Co-sanctioned by the Thailand PGA Tour

=== Taiwan PGA Tour wins (1) ===
No.	Date	Tournament	Winning score	Margin of victory	Runner-up
1	26 Jul 2025	Trust Golf Asian Mixed 1^{1}	−15 (67-66-68=201)	1 stroke	(Thailand) Sarut Vongchaisit

^{1}Mixed event with the Taiwan LPGA Tour

=== ASEAN PGA Tour wins (2) ===
No.	Date	Tournament	Winning score	Margin of victory	Runner-up
1	8 May 2010	Kariza Indonesia Championship	−14 (69-69-70-66=274)	Playoff	(Philippines) Jay Bayron
2	11 Jun 2011	ICTSI Mount Malarayat Championship	−15 (70-70-66-67=273)	3 strokes	(Philippines) Juvic Pagunsan

=== Thailand PGA Tour wins (3) ===
No.	Date	Tournament	Winning score	Margin of victory	Runner-up
1	18 Dec 2016	Singha SAT Championship #8	−20 (65-67-70-66=268)	4 strokes	(Thailand) Namchok Tantipokhakul
2	23 Aug 2020	Singha-SAT Chanthaburi Championship	−14 (65-66-68=199)	Playoff	(Thailand) Panuphol Pittayarat
3	7 Sep 2025	Singha Bangkok Open^{1}	−20 (63-64-69-64=260)	Playoff	(Thailand) Amarin Kraivixien

^{1}Co-sanctioned by the All Thailand Golf Tour

== Team appearances ==
- Southeast Asian Games (representing Thailand): 2007 (winners), 2009 (winners)
