= All Thailand Golf Tour =

Professional golf tour in Thailand

- Current season, competition or edition: 2026 All Thailand Golf Tour
- Formerly: Singha All Thailand Golf Tour; TPC Tour
- Sport: Golf
- Founded: 1999
- First season: 1999
- Commissioner: Jakraphong Thongyai
- Country: Based in Thailand (Note: Schedules have also included events in Vietnam.)
- Most titles: Tournament wins: (Thailand) Prayad Marksaeng (18)
- Broadcasters: TrueVisions; Golf Channel; Golf Visions Thailand; Star Sports; Fox Sports
- Website: allthailandgolftour.com

The All Thailand Golf Tour (or simply as ATGT) is the main professional golf tour in Thailand. All Thailand Golf Tour office is headquartered in Bangkok, Thailand. Originally the TPC Tour, it adopted the name All Thailand Golf Tour in 2008.

The tour is open to professionals and amateurs. Tournaments are generally stroke play events held over four days of 72 holes with the cut being made after 36 holes.

== History ==
The tour began in 1999 and was advanced by the first chairman of Asian Tour, Supphaphorn Marphongphong, who further gathered more support from other professional golfers in Thailand and correspondingly became All Thailand Golf Tour's first commissioner. Boonchu Ruangkit, professional golfer, has been the Chairman of All Thailand Golf Tour Tournament Player Committee (TPC) since 1999 and is still actively involved with ATGT's development.

In 2018, the Official World Golf Ranking announced that the All Thailand Golf Tour would be added into the world rankings starting in 2019. A minimum of five points are awarded for a win at a 72-hole event.

=== Charity fundraising ===
All Thailand Golf Tour has similar beliefs as other leading golf tours such as PGA Tour, European Tour and Asian Tour in providing charitable contributions for society. Overall, All Thailand Golf Tour has donated over 1,000,000 Baht since 2009 and is the only domestic golf tournament in Thailand that actively conducts charitable work.

San Funn

- "San Funn" is a project where Hill Tribe children are the beneficiaries of luncheon programs, educational program and self-sustaining programs.

Golf Aids

- "Golf Aids" is a project in which funds were raised in order to help relief efforts for the victim of tsunami in Japan.

== Order of Merit winners ==
Year	Men	Prize money (฿)	Women	Prize money (฿)
2025	(Thailand) Suradit Yongcharoenchai	1,233,485	No Order of Merit awarded	
2024	(Thailand) Newport Laparojkit	1,132,733	No Order of Merit awarded	
2023	(Thailand) Poosit Supupramai	1,088,303	No Order of Merit awarded	
2022	(Thailand) Settee Prakongvech	1,317,195	No Order of Merit awarded	
2021	(Thailand) Sadom Kaewkanjana	2,542,100	No Order of Merit awarded	
2020	(Thailand) Pavit Tangkamolprasert	879,755	No Order of Merit awarded	
2019	(Thailand) Itthipat Buranatanyarat	1,316,344	No Order of Merit awarded	
2018	(Thailand) Rattanon Wannasrichan	1,091,175	(Thailand) Kamonwan Luamsri	82,000
2017	(Thailand) Panuphol Pittayarat	1,446,800	(Thailand) Chommapat Pongthanarak	166,250
2016	(Thailand) Udorn Duangdecha (2)	1,489,225	(Thailand) Saranporn Langkulgasettrin	125,000
2015	(Thailand) Prayad Marksaeng (6)	2,190,217		
2014	(Thailand) Prayad Marksaeng (5)	1,895,975		
2013	(Thailand) Prayad Marksaeng (4)	1,272,200		
2012	(Thailand) Kiradech Aphibarnrat	900,000		
2011	(Thailand) Prayad Marksaeng (3)			
2010	(Thailand) Udorn Duangdecha	592,208		
2009	(Thailand) Thammanoon Sriroj (3)	656,300		
2008	(Thailand) Prayad Marksaeng (2)	300,000		
2007	(Thailand) Prayad Marksaeng	340,667		
2006	(Thailand) Boonchu Ruangkit	479,333		
2005	(Thailand) Thammanoon Sriroj (2)	283,000		
2004	Unknown			
2003	Unknown			
2002	(Thailand) Thammanoon Sriroj	370,000		
2001	Unknown			
2000	Unknown			
1999	Unknown			
