= Rattanon Wannasrichan =

Thai golfer

Personal information
- Nationality: Thailand
- Born: 11 July 1995 (age 31)

Career
- Sport: Golf
- Turned professional: 2012
- Current tours: Asian Tour; All Thailand Golf Tour
- Professional wins: 8

Number of wins by tour
- Asian Tour: 3
- Other: 5

Achievements and awards
- All Thailand Golf Tour Order of Merit winner: 2018
Medal record
Southeast Asian Games
Gold medal – first place	2011 Jakarta	Men's individual
Gold medal – first place	2011 Jakarta	Men's team

Rattanon Wannasrichan (Thai: รฐนน วรรณศรีจันทร์; born 11 July 1995) is a Thai professional golfer who plays on the Asian Tour. Wannasrichan turned professional in 2012. He clinched his first Asian Tour title at the Thailand Open in May 2017.

== Professional wins (8) ==
=== Asian Tour wins (3) ===
No.	Date	Tournament	Winning score	Margin of victory	Runner(s)-up
1	21 May 2017	Thailand Open	−21 (62-69-65-67=263)	2 strokes	(India) Gaganjeet Bhullar, (India) Shiv Kapur
2	13 Oct 2024	SJM Macao Open	−20 (61-66-67-66=260)	2 strokes	(Thailand) Gunn Charoenkul
3	28 Sep 2025	Mercuries Taiwan Masters^{1}	−5 (72-68-70-73=283)	1 stroke	(Thailand) Suradit Yongcharoenchai

^{1}Co-sanctioned by the Taiwan PGA Tour

Asian Tour playoff record (0–1)

No.	Year	Tournament	Opponent	Result
1	2022	Singapore International	(South Korea) Tom Kim	Lost to birdie on first extra hole

=== Asian Development Tour wins (1) ===
No.	Date	Tournament	Winning score	Margin of victory	Runners-up
1	2 Aug 2015	Taifong Open^{1}	−12 (71-70-70-65=276)	1 stroke	(United States) Casey O'Toole, (Australia) Jordan Sherratt

^{1}Co-sanctioned by the Taiwan PGA Tour

=== All Thailand Golf Tour wins (3) ===
No.	Date	Tournament	Winning score	Margin of victory	Runner(s)-up
1	24 May 2015	Singha All Thailand Championship	−18 (66-65-66-73=270)	2 strokes	(Thailand) Tirawat Kaewsiribandit
2	1 Nov 2015	All Thailand Premier Championship	−12 (68-69-70-69=276)	Playoff	(Thailand) Phachara Khongwatmai, (Thailand) Prom Meesawat
3	18 Feb 2018	Singha E-San Open	−15 (70-70-64-69=273)	Playoff	(Thailand) Pavit Tangkamolprasert

=== Thailand PGA Tour wins (1) ===
No.	Date	Tournament	Winning score	Margin of victory	Runner-up
1	19 Dec 2020	Singha-SAT Khon Kaen Championship	−11 (67-69-69=205)	Playoff	(Thailand) Prayad Marksaeng
