= Laguna Phuket Championship =

Golf tournament in Thailand

Tournament information
- Location: Phuket, Thailand
- Established: 2021
- Course: Laguna Golf Phuket
- Par: 70
- Length: 6,770 yards (6,190 m)
- Tour: Asian Tour
- Format: Stroke play
- Prize fund: US$1,000,000
- Month played: December
- Final year: 2021

Tournament record score
- Aggregate: 270 Phachara Khongwatmai (2021)
- To par: −10 as above

Final champion
- (Thailand) Phachara Khongwatmai

Location map
- Location in Thailand

The Laguna Phuket Championship was a professional golf tournament on the Asian Tour. It was played from 2 to 5 December 2021 at Laguna Golf Phuket in Phuket, Thailand, with a purse of US$1 million.

The tournament was the second Asian Tour event held after the tour resumed following a suspension caused by the COVID-19 pandemic. Phachara Khongwatmai won the tournament with a score of 270, 10-under-par, one stroke ahead of Denwit Boriboonsub, Panuphol Pittayarat and Bio Kim.

== History ==
The Laguna Phuket Championship formed part of the Asian Tour's modified 2020–21–22 season. It followed the Blue Canyon Phuket Championship, another event on the tour held in Phuket the previous week.

In the final round, Phachara Khongwatmai of Thailand shot an even-par 70 to finish at 10-under-par. He holed a 12-foot par putt on the 18th hole to avoid a playoff and win by one stroke. The win was Phachara's first title on the Asian Tour.

== Venue ==
The tournament was staged at Laguna Golf Phuket in Phuket, Thailand. The course is set within Laguna Phuket Resort and is part of the Asian Tour Destinations network. For the event, the course was set up as a par-70 layout measuring 6,770 yards.

The venue had previously hosted the Singha Phuket Open on the Asian Development Tour in 2017. The Laguna Phuket Championship was its first Asian Tour event.

== Winners ==
Year	Winner	Score	To par	Margin of victory	Runners-up	Ref.
2021	(Thailand) Phachara Khongwatmai	270	−10	1 stroke	(Thailand) Denwit Boriboonsub, (Thailand) Panuphol Pittayarat, (South Korea) Bio Kim	
