= Golf at the 2014 Asian Games – Men's individual =

Men's individual at the 2014 Asian Games
- Venue: Dream Park Country Club
- Date: 25 September 2014 – 28 September 2014
- Competitors: 81 from 24 nations

Medalists
gold medal	Pan Cheng-tsung	Chinese Taipei
silver medal	Kim Nam-hun	South Korea
bronze medal	Kevin Yu	Chinese Taipei

The men's individual competition at the 2014 Asian Games in Incheon, South Korea was held from 25 September to 28 September at the Dream Park Country Club.

== Schedule ==
All times are Korea Standard Time (UTC+09:00)

Date	Time	Event
Thursday, 25 September 2014	07:20	Round 1
Friday, 26 September 2014	07:20	Round 2
Saturday, 27 September 2014	07:20	Round 3
Sunday, 28 September 2014	06:50	Round 4

== Results ==
Legend

- DNS — Did not start

Rank	Athlete	Round				Total	To par
Rank	Athlete	1	2	3	4	Total	To par
1st place, gold medalist(s)	Pan Cheng-tsung (TPE)	66	69	65	71	271	−17
2nd place, silver medalist(s)	Kim Nam-hun (KOR)	67	72	66	68	273	−15
3rd place, bronze medalist(s)	Kevin Yu (TPE)	70	66	73	67	276	−12
4	Natipong Srithong (THA)	70	71	70	66	277	−11
5	Bai Zhengkai (CHN)	75	66	68	68	277	−11
6	Kao Teng (TPE)	69	68	71	69	277	−11
7	Udayan Mane (IND)	70	66	72	69	277	−11
7	Youm Eun-ho (KOR)	67	66	68	76	277	−11
9	Kenta Konishi (JPN)	71	69	72	66	278	−10
9	Danthai Boonma (THA)	70	70	67	71	278	−10
11	Manu Gandas (IND)	71	69	68	71	279	−9
12	Dou Zecheng (CHN)	70	70	72	69	281	−7
13	Shohei Hasegawa (JPN)	70	73	71	68	282	−6
13	Guan Tianlang (CHN)	69	72	71	70	282	−6
13	Tawan Phongphun (THA)	68	70	73	71	282	−6
16	Kasidit Lepkurte (THA)	72	69	73	69	283	−5
16	Johnson Poh (SIN)	70	73	71	69	283	−5
18	Rupert Zaragosa (PHI)	72	74	71	67	284	−4
19	Kong Tae-hyun (KOR)	76	72	68	69	285	−3
19	Feroz Garewal (IND)	70	73	69	73	285	−3
19	Kazuya Koura (JPN)	71	70	70	74	285	−3
22	Wang Wei-lun (TPE)	72	75	69	70	286	−2
22	Low Khai Jei (MAS)	69	75	70	72	286	−2
22	Md Sajib Ali (BAN)	70	74	70	72	286	−2
22	Kim Young-woong (KOR)	71	75	68	72	286	−2
26	Jonathan Woo (SIN)	75	72	71	69	287	−1
26	Afif Razif (MAS)	71	71	73	72	287	−1
26	Marc Ong (SIN)	70	71	73	73	287	−1
29	Takashi Ogiso (JPN)	77	71	74	66	288	0
29	Gregory Raymund Foo (SIN)	71	71	73	73	288	0
29	Azaan Al-Rumhi (OMA)	69	71	73	75	288	0
32	Samarth Dwivedi (IND)	71	73	75	71	290	+2
33	Trương Chí Quân (VIE)	72	73	76	70	291	+3
34	Chan Tuck Soon (MAS)	72	77	73	70	292	+4
35	Zhang Jin (CHN)	70	73	77	73	293	+5
35	Md Nazim (BAN)	77	73	68	75	293	+5
37	Yeung Mo Tin (HKG)	74	77	76	69	296	+8
37	Justin Quiban (PHI)	71	74	75	76	296	+8
39	Md Ismail (BAN)	78	75	72	72	297	+9
39	Wafi Abdul Manaf (MAS)	75	78	72	72	297	+9
39	Dechen Ugyen (BHU)	74	76	75	72	297	+9
42	Raymart Tolentino (PHI)	75	79	73	72	299	+11
43	Thammasack Bouahom (LAO)	77	78	75	70	300	+12
43	Xiao Jieyu (MAC)	76	74	73	77	300	+12
45	Kristoffer Arevalo (PHI)	79	73	74	75	301	+13
46	Tanka Bahadur Karki (NEP)	73	77	75	80	305	+17
47	Ali Al-Shahrani (QAT)	79	77	75	75	306	+18
48	Đỗ Lê Gia Đạt (VIE)	77	78	77	75	307	+19
48	Vasin Manibanseng (LAO)	78	77	76	76	307	+19
50	Saleh Al-Kaabi (QAT)	75	76	82	75	308	+20
51	Faisal Mir (QAT)	73	82	76	78	309	+21
52	Dinesh Prajapati (NEP)	79	82	74	75	310	+22
53	Md Sagor (BAN)	80	76	78	77	311	+23
53	Thammalack Bouahom (LAO)	75	79	78	79	311	+23
55	Đặng Hồng Anh (VIE)	82	81	74	75	312	+24
56	Ali Al-Sakha (KSA)	81	79	75	78	313	+25
57	Luvsandondovyn Dondovtseveen (MGL)	76	80	79	79	314	+26
57	Bishnu Prasad Sharma (NEP)	75	79	80	80	314	+26
59	Choi Hou Kuan (MAC)	75	83	81	79	318	+30
60	Abdulrahman Al-Shahrani (QAT)	87	79	78	75	319	+31
60	Abdullah Al-Hussain (KSA)	78	78	86	77	319	+31
60	Tashi Tsering (NEP)	73	79	81	86	319	+31
63	Ali Al-Saleh (OMA)	82	79	79	83	323	+35
64	Abdulrahman Al-Mansour (KSA)	83	84	79	78	324	+36
65	Yan Sihuang (MAC)	76	82	86	82	326	+38
66	Tang Chak Hou (MAC)	77	84	90	81	332	+44
67	Delgermaagiin Ölziidelger (MGL)	83	86	85	82	336	+48
68	Bekarys Sultangazin (KAZ)	89	79	89	80	337	+49
69	Batsaikhany Altaibaatar (MGL)	85	87	84	85	341	+53
70	Hamood Al-Harthi (OMA)	85	91	84	84	344	+56
71	Mazen Al-Ansari (KUW)	86	94	84	84	348	+60
72	Turki Al-Hussain (KSA)	85	88	89	87	349	+61
73	Hashmatullah Sarwari (AFG)	91	89	88	83	351	+63
74	Ahmed Al-Bulushi (OMA)	88	92	83	89	352	+64
74	Bauyrzhan Sarkytbayev (KAZ)	87	88	84	93	352	+64
76	Ali Ahmad Fazel (AFG)	94	91	89	87	361	+73
77	Ali Al-Ansari (KUW)	92	90	97	85	364	+76
78	Gangaagiin Mendsaikhan (MGL)	90	96	94	91	371	+83
79	Aidarali Asanov (KGZ)	95	92	91	101	379	+91
80	Ali Marafi (KUW)	98	104	90	101	393	+105
—	Doãn Văn Định (VIE)	DNS				DNS	
