= Sadom Kaewkanjana =

Thai professional golfer (born 1998)

Personal information
- Nationality: Thailand
- Born: 6 July 1998 (age 28) Narathiwat, Thailand
- Height: 5 ft 10 in (1.78 m)
- Weight: 163 lb (74 kg; 11.6 st)

Career
- Sport: Golf
- Turned professional: 2018
- Current tours: European Tour; Asian Tour; All Thailand Golf Tour
- Former tours: Korean Tour; Asian Development Tour; LIV Golf
- Professional wins: 11
- Highest ranking: 75 (12 February 2023) (as of 8 November 2026)

Number of wins by tour
- Asian Tour: 3
- Other: 8

Best results in major championships
- Masters Tournament: DNP
- PGA Championship: CUT: 2022, 2023
- U.S. Open: DNP
- The Open Championship: T11: 2022

Achievements and awards
- Asian Tour Rookie of the Year: 2019
- All Thailand Golf Tour Order of Merit winner: 2021
- Korean Tour Rookie of the Year: 2025
Medal record
Men's golf
Representing Thailand
Asian Games
Bronze medal – third place	2026 Aichi–Nagoya	Men's individual
SEA Games
Silver medal – second place	2017 Kuala Lumpur	Men's team

Sadom Kaewkanjana (Thai: สดมภ์ แก้วกาญจนา; born 6 July 1998) is a Thai professional golfer who plays on the Asian Tour where he has won twice. Kaewkanjana won his first Asian Tour event in 2019 at the Bangabandhu Cup Golf Open which made him the fastest qualifying school graduate to win on the Asian Tour. In 2021, he won three times on the All Thailand Golf Tour, including the Thailand Open, and led the Order of Merit. He captured his second Asian Tour title at the 2022 SMBC Singapore Open and earned the spot in the 2022 Open Championship at St Andrews.

== Amateur wins ==
- 2014 Singha Thailand Junior World Championship #7
- 2017 Philippine Amateur Open Championship, National Team Ranking #2, Malaysian Amateur Open, All India Amateur
- 2018 National Team Ranking #2, National Team Ranking #4, Dutch International Junior Open

== Professional wins (11) ==
=== Asian Tour wins (3) ===
No.	Date	Tournament	Winning score	Margin of victory	Runner(s)-up
1	6 Apr 2019	Bangabandhu Cup Golf Open	−19 (65-62-68-70=265)	1 stroke	(India) Ajeetesh Sandhu
2	23 Jan 2022	SMBC Singapore Open^{1}	−13 (67-70-65-69=271)	3 strokes	(Japan) Yuto Katsuragawa, (South Korea) Tom Kim
3	25 May 2025	Kolon Korea Open^{2}	−7 (69-69-69-70=277)	2 strokes	(Thailand) Poom Saksansin

^{1}Co-sanctioned by the Japan Golf Tour, but unofficial event on that tour.
^{2}Co-sanctioned by the Korean Tour

=== Korean Tour wins (1) ===
No.	Date	Tournament	Winning score	Margin of victory	Runner-up
1	25 May 2025	Kolon Korea Open^{1}	−7 (69-69-69-70=277)	2 strokes	(Thailand) Poom Saksansin

^{1}Co-sanctioned by the Asian Tour

=== Asian Development Tour wins (1) ===
No.	Date	Tournament	Winning score	Margin of victory	Runner-up
1	17 Feb 2019	Thongchai Jaidee Foundation^{1}	−14 (67-67-64-68=266)	1 stroke	(Thailand) Kosuke Hamamoto

^{1}Co-sanctioned by the All Thailand Golf Tour

=== All Thailand Golf Tour wins (5) ===
No.	Date	Tournament	Winning score	Margin of victory	Runner-up
1	15 Oct 2017	Singha Pattaya Open (as an amateur)	−8 (68-71-68-65=272)	1 stroke	(Thailand) Kammalas Namuangruk (a)
2	17 Feb 2019	Thongchai Jaidee Foundation^{1}	−14 (67-67-64-68=266)	1 stroke	(Thailand) Kosuke Hamamoto
3	10 Oct 2021	Singha Laguna Phuket Open	−13 (69-65-67-66=267)	4 strokes	(Thailand) Ratchanon Chantananuwat (a)
4	31 Oct 2021	Thailand Open	−23 (66-66-64-66=261)	4 strokes	(Thailand) Prom Meesawat
5	14 Nov 2021	Singha Classic	−9 (69-69-70-67=275)	1 stroke	(Thailand) Nitithorn Thippong

^{1}Co-sanctioned by the Asian Development Tour

=== Thailand PGA Tour wins (2) ===
No.	Date	Tournament	Winning score	Margin of victory	Runner-up
1	3 Oct 2021	Singha-SAT Phuket Classic	−14 (66-65-68=199)	1 stroke	(Thailand) Suteepat Prateeptienchai
2	9 Aug 2025	Singha-SAT Nakhon Nayok Championship	−14 (67-72-62-65=266)	2 strokes	(Thailand) Nopparat Panichphol

=== TrustGolf Tour wins (1) ===
No.	Date	Tournament	Winning score	Margin of victory	Runner-up
1	31 Dec 2021	Thailand Mixed #5	−29 (65-64-66-64=259)	2 strokes	(Thailand) Wichayapat Sinsrang

== Results in major championships ==
Tournament	2022	2023	2024	2025
Masters Tournament				
PGA Championship	CUT	CUT		
U.S. Open				
The Open Championship	T11			CUT

Did not play

CUT = missed the half-way cut
"T" = tied

== Team appearances ==
Amateur

- Bonallack Trophy (representing Asia/Pacific): 2018 (winners)
- Eisenhower Trophy (representing Thailand): 2016, 2018
- Asian Games (representing Thailand): 2018
- Nomura Cup (representing Thailand): 2017 (winners)
- Southeast Asian Games (representing Thailand): 2017
- Amata Friendship Cup (representing Thailand): 2018 (winners)

== See also ==
- 2025 European Tour Qualifying School graduates
