= Golf at the 2013 SEA Games – Men's individual =

The men's team competition at the 2013 SEA Games in Naypyidaw was held on from 15 December to 18 December at the Royal Myanmar Golf Course.

== Schedule ==
All times are Myanmar Standard Time (UTC+06:30)

Date	Time	Event
Sunday, 15 December 2013	08:00	First round
Monday, 16 December 2013	08:00	Second round
Tuesday, 17 December 2013	07:30	Third round
Wednesday, 18 December 2013	07:30	Fourth round

== Results ==
Rank	Athlete	Rounds				Total	To par
Rank	Athlete	1	2	3	4	Total	To par
1st place, gold medalist(s)	Danthai Boonma (THA)	68	70	68	72	278	−10
2nd place, silver medalist(s)	Gavin Kyle Green (MAS)	68	73	69	68	278	−10
3rd place, bronze medalist(s)	Poom Saksansin (THA)	72	69	69	71	281	−7
4	Ye Htet Aung (MYA)	71	76	67	69	283	−5
=5	Abel Tam Kwang Yuan (MAS)	75	74	65	70	284	−4
=5	Myo Win Aung (MYA)	70	71	72	71	284	−4
=5	Natipong Srithong (THA)	71	69	71	73	284	−4
=5	Nattawat Suvajanakorn (THA)	71	72	67	74	284	−4
=9	Ruperto III Zaragosa (PHI)	75	71	72	67	285	−3
=9	William Sjaichudin (INA)	69	72	73	71	285	−3
=11	Ke Jun Jonathan Woo (SIN)	70	74	73	69	286	−2
=11	Thein Naing Soe (MYA)	71	71	70	74	286	−2
13	Jerome En Yong Ng (SIN)	72	75	69	71	287	−1
=14	Abdul Hadi Uda Thith (SIN)	71	75	74	70	290	+2
=14	Thammasack Bouahom (LAO)	73	73	71	73	290	+2
=14	Muhammad Wafiyuddin Bin Abdul Manaf (MAS)	73	71	70	76	290	+2
17	Kevin Caesario Akbar (INA)	71	76	73	71	291	+3
=18	Chi Quan Truong (VIE)	70	76	75	72	293	+5
=18	Maung Maung Oo (MYA)	74	69	76	74	293	+5
=18	Jordan Surya Irawan (INA)	72	72	72	77	293	+5
=21	Low Khai Jei (MAS)	75	73	73	73	294	+6
=21	Jobim Antonio Carlos (PHI)	73	76	71	74	294	+6
23	Chong Chin Marc Ong (SIN)	76	72	72	75	295	+7
24	Syukrizal (INA)	71	72	75	78	296	+8
25	John Kier Abdon (PHI)	70	76	78	73	297	+9
26	Justin Raphael Quiban (PHI)	82	75	72	71	300	+12
27	Axay Luangkhamdeng (LAO)	71	79	80	73	303	+15
28	Lundi Chea (CAM)	77	81	76	74	308	+20
29	Vasin Manibangeng (LAO)	77	78	78	77	310	+22
30	Le Gia Dat Do (VIE)	76	81	73	83	313	+25
31	Thammasack Bouahom (LAO)	73	73	71	73	319	+31
32	Sokhamony Thong (CAM)	87	89	84	83	343	+55
