= 2019 Asian Development Tour =

Golf tour season

2019 Asian Development Tour season
- Duration: 9 January 2019 – 28 December 2019
- Number of official events: 19
- Most wins: (South Korea) Tom Kim (3)
- Order of Merit: (Japan) Naoki Sekito

The 2019 Asian Development Tour was the 10th season of the Asian Development Tour, the official development tour to the Asian Tour.

== Schedule ==
The following table lists official events during the 2019 season.

Date	Tournament	Host country	Purse (US$)	Winner (Note: The number in brackets after each winner's name is the number of Asian Development Tour events they had won up to and including that tournament. It is rare for someone to accumulate many wins on the Asian Development Tour as success at this level usually leads to promotion to the Asian Tour.)	OWGR points	Other tours (Note: ATGT − All Thailand Golf Tour; PGM − Professional Golf of Malaysia Tour; PTINA − PGA Tour of Indonesia; TWN − Taiwan PGA Tour.)
13 Jan	Boonchu Ruangkit Championship	Thailand	฿4,000,000	(Thailand) Itthipat Buranatanyarat (3)	10	ATGT
17 Feb	Thongchai Jaidee Foundation	Thailand	฿4,000,000	(Thailand) Sadom Kaewkanjana (1)	6	ATGT
9 Mar	Johor Championship	Malaysia	RM225,000	(Thailand) Pannakorn Uthaipas (2)	6	PGM
16 Mar	UMW Championship	Malaysia	RM225,000	(Japan) Kazuki Higa (2)	6	PGM
20 Apr	Penang Championship	Malaysia	RM225,000	(Japan) Naoki Sekito (1)	6	PGM
27 Apr	Butra Heidelberg Cement Brunei Championships	Brunei	75,000	(Thailand) Prom Meesawat (1)	9	
10 May	OB Golf Invitational	Indonesia	65,000	(South Korea) Seung Park (1)	6	PTINA
19 May	Singha Laguna Phuket Open	Thailand	฿2,000,000	(Argentina) Miguel Ángel Carballo (2)	6	ATGT
29 Jun	Tiara Melaka Championship	Malaysia	RM225,000	(South Korea) Tom Kim (1)	6	PGM
2 Aug	Gunung Geulis Golf Invitational	Indonesia	75,000	(Japan) Naoki Sekito (2)	6	PTINA
24 Aug	Ciputra Golfpreneur Tournament	Indonesia	110,000	(South Korea) Tom Kim (2)	6	PTINA
24 Aug	Northport Championship	Malaysia	RM225,000	(Singapore) Quincy Quek (2)	6	PGM
14 Sep	Sabah Championship	Malaysia	RM225,000	(Sweden) Oscar Zetterwall (3)	6	PGM
21 Sep	MNRB Championship	Malaysia	RM225,000	(Malaysia) Kim Leun Kwang (1)	6	PGM
27 Sep	Combiphar Players Championship	Indonesia	100,000	(Japan) Ryuichi Oiwa (1)	6	PTINA
20 Oct	Raya Pakistan Open	Pakistan	80,000	(South Korea) Tom Kim (3) (Note: Kim earned immediate promotion to the Asian Tour, as this was his third win of the season.)	n/a	
23 Nov	MIDF Championship	Malaysia	RM225,000	(Thailand) Pannakorn Uthaipas (3)	6	PGM
30 Nov	Maybank Championship	Malaysia	RM225,000	(Thailand) Nirun Sae-ueng (2)	6	PGM
28 Dec	Taifong Open	Taiwan	160,000	(Thailand) Donlaphatchai Niyomchon (1)	7	TWN

== Order of Merit ==
The Order of Merit was based on prize money won during the season, calculated in U.S. dollars. The top seven players on the Order of Merit (not otherwise exempt) earned status to play on the 2020–21–22 Asian Tour.

Position	Player	Prize money ($)
1	(Japan) Naoki Sekito	50,942
2	(Thailand) Pannakorn Uthaipas	29,794
3	(Thailand) Donlaphatchai Niyomchon	29,697
4	(Thailand) Itthipat Buranatanyarat	29,673
5	(Taiwan) Chang Wei-lun	27,276
6	(England) Steve Lewton	25,451
7	(United States) Trevor Simsby	24,883
8	(South Korea) Park Seung	24,051
