= Danthai Boonma =

Thai professional golfer (born 1996)

Personal information
- Nationality: Thailand
- Born: 23 January 1996 (age 30)

Career
- Sport: Golf
- Turned professional: 2014
- Current tours: Asian Tour; All Thailand Golf Tour
- Professional wins: 8

Number of wins by tour
- Asian Tour: 2
- Other: 6

Best results in major championships
- Masters Tournament: DNP
- PGA Championship: DNP
- U.S. Open: DNP
- The Open Championship: CUT: 2018
Medal record
Men's golf
Representing Thailand
Youth Olympic Games
Bronze medal – third place	2014 Nanjing	Individual
Asian Games
Silver medal – second place	2022 Hangzhou	Team
Bronze medal – third place	2014 Incheon	Team
Asian Youth Games
Bronze medal – third place	2013 Nanjing	Individual
SEA Games
Gold medal – first place	2013 Naypyidaw	Individual
Gold medal – first place	2013 Naypyidaw	Team

Danthai Boonma (Thai: แดนไท บุญมา; born 23 January 1996) is a Thai professional golfer who plays on the Asian Tour.

== Amateur career ==
As an amateur, Boonma won several tournaments in Asia. He also competed in several multi-sport events winning the following medals:

Games	Event	Medal
2013 Asian Youth Games	Boys' individual	Bronze
2013 SEA Games	Men's individual	Gold
2013 SEA Games	Men's team	Gold
2014 Summer Youth Olympics	Boy's individual	Bronze
2014 Asian Games	Men's team	Bronze

== Professional career ==
Boonma turned professional in late 2014. He played on the Asian Tour in 2015, winning the World Classic Championship in November.

== Amateur wins ==
- 2012 TGA-CAT Junior Ranking 4, TGA-CAT Junior Ranking 5, TGA-CAT Junior Championship (Asia Pacific), Asia Pacific Junior, Lion City Cup, Tehbotol Sosro International Junior
- 2013 TGA-CAT Junior Championship (Asia Pacific)
- 2014 MPI Saujana Amateur Championship, Singapore Open Amateur Championship, Putra Cup

== Professional wins (8) ==
=== Asian Tour wins (2) ===
No.	Date	Tournament	Winning score	Margin of victory	Runner-up
1	15 Nov 2015	World Classic Championship	−2 (72-69-72-69=282)	1 stroke	(Malaysia) Nicholas Fung
2	27 Nov 2022	Bangabandhu Cup Golf Bangladesh Open	−13 (68-70-65-68=271)	1 stroke	(Thailand) Kosuke Hamamoto

=== Japan Challenge Tour wins (1) ===
No.	Date	Tournament	Winning score	Margin of victory	Runners-up
1	19 Apr 2019	i Golf Shaper Challenge	−10 (66-71-69=206)	2 strokes	(Japan) Yushi Ito, (Japan) Koichi Kitamura, (Japan) Yuta Uetake

=== Asian Development Tour wins (1) ===
No.	Date	Tournament	Winning score	Margin of victory	Runner-up
1	25 Dec 2016	Boonchu Ruangkit Championship^{1}	−15 (65-67-72-65=269)	Playoff	(Thailand) Jazz Janewattananond

^{1}Co-sanctioned by the All Thailand Golf Tour

=== All Thailand Golf Tour wins (5) ===
No.	Date	Tournament	Winning score	Margin of victory	Runner(s)-up
1	25 Dec 2016	Boonchu Ruangkit Championship^{1}	−15 (65-67-72-65=269)	Playoff	(Thailand) Jazz Janewattananond
2	26 Feb 2017	Singha E-San Open	−22 (68-65-66-67=266)	7 strokes	(Thailand) Gunn Charoenkul, (Thailand) Chapchai Nirat
3	10 Feb 2019	Singha E-San Open (2)	−20 (66-67-68-67=268)	5 strokes	(Thailand) Witchayanon Chothirunrungrueng
4	3 Aug 2025	Singha Championship	−13 (70-67-64-70=271)	1 stroke	(Thailand) Thanapol Charoensuk, (Thailand) Jakkanat Inmee, (Thailand) Natipong Srithong
5	15 Feb 2026	Singha E-San Open (3)	−16 (66-69-68-69=272)	Playoff	(Thailand) Poom Saksansin, (Thailand) Pavit Tangkamolprasert

^{1}Co-sanctioned by the Asian Development Tour

== Results in major championships ==
Tournament	2018
Masters Tournament	
U.S. Open	
The Open Championship	CUT
PGA Championship	

Did not play

CUT = missed the halfway cut
