= Blue Canyon Phuket Championship =

Golf tournament in Thailand

Tournament information
- Location: Phuket, Thailand
- Established: 2021
- Courses: Blue Canyon Country Club; Canyon Course
- Par: 72
- Length: 7,257 yards (6,636 m)
- Tour: Asian Tour
- Format: Stroke play
- Prize fund: US$1,000,000
- Month played: November
- Final year: 2021

Tournament record score
- Aggregate: 270 Chan Shih-chang (2021)
- To par: −18 as above

Final champion
- (Taiwan) Chan Shih-chang

Location map
- Location in Thailand

The Blue Canyon Phuket Championship was a professional golf tournament on the Asian Tour. It was played from 25 to 28 November 2021 on the Canyon Course at Blue Canyon Country Club in Phuket, Thailand, with a purse of US$1 million.

The tournament marked the Asian Tour's return to competition after a suspension of almost two years caused by the COVID-19 pandemic. Chan Shih-chang won the tournament with a score of 270, 18-under-par, one stroke ahead of Tom Kim and Sadom Kaewkanjana.

== History ==
The Blue Canyon Phuket Championship formed part of the Asian Tour's modified 2020–21–22 season. It was followed in December 2021 by the Laguna Phuket Championship, another event on the tour held in Phuket.

In the final round, Chan Shih-chang shot a four-under-par 68 to finish at 18-under-par. He made par on the 18th hole while Sadom Kaewkanjana made bogey, giving Chan a one-stroke victory. The win was Chan's third Asian Tour title and his first since 2016.

Thailand's Ratchanon Chantananuwat, then aged 14, made his Asian Tour debut in the event and finished tied for 15th at 12-under-par after a closing 65.

== Venue ==
The tournament was staged on the Canyon Course at Blue Canyon Country Club in Phuket, Thailand. For the event, the course was set up as a par-72 layout measuring 7,257 yards. The venue had previously hosted international tournaments including the Johnnie Walker Classic and the Thailand Open.

== Winners ==
Year	Winner	Score	To par	Margin of victory	Runners-up	Ref.
2021	(Taiwan) Chan Shih-chang	270	−18	1 stroke	(Thailand) Sadom Kaewkanjana, (South Korea) Tom Kim	
