= 2018 Amata Friendship Cup =

Coordinates: 37.380°N 126.624°E

- Dates: 21–23 December 2018
- Venue: Amata Spring Country Club
- Location: Chonburi, Thailand
- Captains: Boonchu Ruangkit Virada Nirapathpongporn (Thailand); Naomichi Ozaki Miho Koga (Japan)
15	13
- Thailand wins the Amata Friendship Cup

Location in Thailand

The 2018 Amata Friendship Cup (Thai: อมตะ เฟรนด์ชิพ คัพ 2018; Japanese: 2018年アマタフレンドシップカップ) was the first edition of the Amata Friendship Cup matches, held 21–23 December at the Amata Spring Country Club in Chonburi, Thailand. The Amata Friendship Cup is a team competition between the top mixed-gender professional and amateur golfers from Thailand and Japan. It is a three-day match play event between teams of twelve players with a similar format to the Ryder Cup and Solheim Cup. Boonchu Ruangkit and Virada Nirapathpongporn captained the Thai team and Naomichi Ozaki and Miho Koga captained the Japanese team.

Team Thailand won by a score of 15–13.

== Format ==
The Amata Friendship Cup is a match play event, with each match worth one point. The format is as follows:

- Day 1 (Friday): Four foursome (alternate shot) matches in a morning session and four fourball (better ball) matches in an afternoon session.
- Day 2 (Saturday): Four foursome (alternate shot) matches in a morning session and four fourball (better ball) matches in an afternoon session.
- Day 3 (Sunday): 12 singles matches. All 12 players from each team participate.

== Teams ==
Each team consisted of five male professionals, five female professionals, one male and one female amateur.

=== Team Thailand ===
Team Thailand
Male professionals
Player	Age	World ranking
Kiradech Aphibarnrat	29	38
Jazz Janewattananond	23	125
Prayad Marksaeng	52	299
Thongchai Jaidee	49	438
Prom Meesawat	34	493
Female professionals
Player	Age	Rolex ranking
Ariya Jutanugarn	23	1
Moriya Jutanugarn	24	20
Pornanong Phatlum	29	50
Thidapa Suwannapura	26	94
Pannarat Thanapolboonyaras	20	160
Male amateur
Player	Age	WAGR ranking
Sadom Kaewkanjana	20	13
Female amateur
Player	Age	WAGR ranking
Atthaya Thitikul	15	8

=== Team Japan ===
Team Japan
Male professionals
Player	Age	World ranking
Satoshi Kodaira	29	47
Ryuko Tokimatsu	25	113
Kodai Ichihara	36	171
Hideto Tanihara	40	172
Masahiro Kawamura	25	215
Female professionals
Player	Age	Rolex ranking
Nasa Hataoka	19	7
Fumika Kawagishi	24	142
Sakura Koiwai	20	59
Mami Fukuda	26	118
Erika Hara	19	132
Male amateur
Player	Age	WAGR ranking
Yuto Katsuragawa	20	454
Female amateur
Player	Age	WAGR ranking
Yuri Yoshida	18	67

== Day one ==
Friday, 21 December 2018

=== Morning foursomes ===
The opening round of four fourball matches started at 7:15 am local time. The first point of the 2018 Amata Friendship Cup was won by Team Japan, with Ryuko Tokimatsu and Erika Hara winning 6 & 5 against Prayad Marksaeng and Moriya Jutanugarn. Prom Meesawat and Pannarat Thanapolboonyaras came from two down after the fourth and fifth hole to beat Masahiro Kawamura and Mami Fukuda two up. Jaidee and Thidapa Suwannapura also won by one against Kodai Ichihara and Sakura Koiwai one up. In the last match, Aphibarnrat and Thitikul won the seventeenth hole to halve Satoshi Kodaira and Yuri Yoshida, and to end the first morning 2 1/2–1 1/2 in favour of Team Thailand.

(Thailand)	Results	(Japan)
Marksaeng/M.Jutanugarn	(Japan) 6 & 5	Tokimatsu/Hara
Meesawat/Thanapolboonyaras	(Thailand) 2 up	Kawamura/Fukuda
Jaidee/Suwannapura	(Thailand) 1 up	Ichihara/Koiwai
Aphibarnrat/Thitikul	halved	Kodaira/Yoshida
2 1/2	Session	1 1/2
2 1/2	Overall	1 1/2

=== Afternoon four-ball ===
The afternoon session was won by team Thailand. It started at 12:00 pm local time. Jazz Janewattananond and Pornanong Phatlum won 3 & 2 over Hideto Tanihara and Nasa Hataoka, Prayad Marksaeng and Ariya Jutanugarn won the last hole to halve Kodai Ichihara and Fumika Kawagishi, Ryuko Tokimatsu and Erika Hara won for the second time, this time 4 & 3 over Prom Meesawat/Pannarat Thanapolboonyaras. The fourt pairing, Sadom Kaewkanjana and Moriya Jutanugarn won over Yuto Katsuragawa and Sakura Koiwai one up.

(Thailand)	Results	(Japan)
Janewattananond/Phatlum	(Thailand) 3 & 2	Tanihara/Hataoka
Marksaeng/A.Jutanugarn	halved	Ichihara/Kawagishi
Meesawat/Thanapolboonyaras	(Japan) 4 & 3	Tokimatsu/Hara
Kaewkanjana/M.Jutanugarn	(Thailand) 1 up	Katsuragawa/Koiwai
2 1/2	Session	1 1/2
5	Overall	3

== Day two ==
Saturday, 22 December 2018

=== Morning foursomes ===
(Thailand)	Results	(Japan)
Jaidee/Suwannapura	(Japan) 3 & 2	Kawamura/Hara
Meesawat/Thanapolboonyaras	(Thailand) 1 up	Tokimatsu/Hataoka
Janewattananond/A.Jutanugarn	(Thailand) 7 & 5	Kodaira/Koiwai
Kaewkanjana/Phatlum	(Thailand) 6 & 5	Katsuragawa/Fukuda
3	Session	1
8	Overall	4

=== Afternoon four-ball ===
(Thailand)	Results	(Japan)
Janewattananond/M.Jutanugarn	(Thailand) 2 & 1	Kawamura/Kawagishi
Jaidee/Phatlum	(Japan) 1 up	Ichihara/Fukuda
Aphibarnrat/A.Jutanugarn	(Thailand) 2 & 1	Kodaira/Hataoka
Marksaeng/Thitikul	(Japan) 5 & 3	Tanihara/Yoshida
2	Session	2
10	Overall	6

== Day three ==
Sunday, 23 December 2018

=== Singles ===
(Thailand)	Results	(Japan)
Sadom Kaewkanjana	(Japan) 1 up	Yuto Katsuragawa
Atthaya Thitikul	(Thailand) 1 up	Yuri Yoshida
Jazz Janewattananond	(Thailand) 1 up	Kodai Ichihara
Pannarat Thanapolboonyaras	(Japan) 1 up	Erika Hara
Prom Meesawat	halved	Ryuko Tokimatsu
Thidapa Suwannapura	(Thailand) 2 up	Sakura Koiwai
Thongchai Jaidee	(Japan) 3 & 2	Masahiro Kawamura
Pornanong Phatlum	(Japan) 5 & 3	Fumika Kawagishi
Prayad Marksaeng	halved	Hideto Tanihara
Moriya Jutanugarn	(Japan) 1 up	Mami Fukuda
Kiradech Aphibarnrat	(Thailand) 1 up	Satoshi Kodaira
Ariya Jutanugarn	(Japan) 3 & 1	Nasa Hataoka
5	Session	7
15	Overall	13

== Individual player records ==
Each entry refers to the win–loss–half record of the player.

=== Thailand ===
Player	Points	Overall	Singles	Foursomes	Fourballs
Jazz Janewattananond	4	4–0–0	1–0–0	1–0–0	2–0–0
Kiradech Aphibarnrat	2.5	2–0–1	1–0–0	0–0–1	1–0–0
Ariya Jutanugarn	2.5	2–1–1	0–1–0	1–0–0	1–0–1
Prom Meesawat	2.5	2–1–1	0–0–1	2–0–0	0–1–0
Moriya Jutanugarn	2	2–2–0	0–1–0	0–1–0	2–0–0
Sadom Kaewkanjana	2	2–1–0	0–1–0	1–0–0	1–0–0
Pornanong Phatlum	2	2–2–0	0–1–0	1–0–0	1–1–0
Thidapa Suwannapura	2	2–1–0	1–0–0	1–1–0	0–0–0
Pannarat Thanapolboonyaras	2	2–2–0	0–1–0	2–0–0	0–1–0
Atthaya Thitikul	1.5	1–1–1	1–0–0	0–0–1	0–1–0
Thongchai Jaidee	1	1–3–0	0–1–0	1–1–0	0–1–0
Prayad Marksaeng	1	0–2–2	0–0–1	0–1–0	0–1–1

=== Japan ===
Player	Points	Overall	Singles	Foursomes	Fourballs
Erika Hara	4	4–0–0	1–0–0	2–0–0	1–0–0
Ryuko Tokimatsu	2.5	2–1–1	0–0–1	1–1–0	1–0–0
Mami Fukuda	2	2–2–0	1–0–0	0–2–0	1–0–0
Masahiro Kawamura	2	2–2–0	1–0–0	1–1–0	0–1–0
Kodai Ichihara	1.5	1–2–1	0–1–0	0–1–0	1–0–1
Fumika Kawagishi	1.5	1–1–1	1–0–0	0–0–0	0–1–1
Hideto Tanihara	1.5	1–1–1	0–0–1	0–0–0	1–1–0
Yuri Yoshida	1.5	1–1–1	0–1–0	0–0–1	1–0–0
Nasa Hataoka	1	1–3–0	1–0–0	0–1–0	0–2–0
Yuto Katsuragawa	1	1–2–0	1–0–0	0–1–0	0–1–0
Satoshi Kodaira	0.5	0–3–1	0–1–0	0–1–1	0–1–0
Sakura Koiwai	0	0–4–0	0–1–0	0–2–0	0–1–0

== Partners ==
2018 Amata Friendship Cup partners
Tier	Sponsoring firms
Presenting	Toyota
Platinum	Singha Corporation, Siam Commercial Bank
Gold	Siam Cement Group, Tourism Authority of Thailand (under the slogan Amazing Thailand), International Sports Promotion Society
Silver	PPTV HD 36, Fenix XCell, Ricoh
