= 2023 All Thailand Golf Tour =

Golf tour season

2023 All Thailand Golf Tour season
- Duration: 26 January 2023 – 10 December 2023
- Number of official events: 13
- Order of Merit: (Thailand) Poosit Supupramai

The 2023 All Thailand Golf Tour was the 25th season of the All Thailand Golf Tour (formerly the TPC Tour), one of the main professional golf tours in Thailand since it was formed in 1999.

== Schedule ==
The following table lists official events during the 2023 season.

| Date | Tournament | Location | Purse (฿) | Winner (Note: The number in brackets after each winner's name is the number of All Thailand Golf Tour events they had won up to and including that tournament.) | OWGR points | Other tours (Note: ADT − Asian Development Tour.) |
|---|---|---|---|---|---|---|
| 29 Jan | Boonchu Ruangkit Championship | Nakhon Ratchasima | 5,000,000 | (Malaysia) Amir Nazrin (1) | 1.35 | |
| 26 Feb | Singha E-San Open | Khon Kaen | 3,000,000 | (Thailand) Nopparat Panichphol (1) | 1.13 | |
| 19 Mar | Singha All Thailand Memorial | Chanthaburi | 3,000,000 | (Thailand) Weerawish Narkprachar (1) | 0.86 | |
| 23 Apr | Singha Classic | Nakhon Nayok | 3,000,000 | (Thailand) Varanyu Rattanaphiboonkij (3) | 1.51 | |
| 28 May | Singha Laguna Phuket Open | Phuket | 4,000,000 | (Indonesia) Naraajie Ramadhan Putra (n/a) | 2.18 | ADT |
| 11 Jun | Singha Chiang Mai Open | Chiang Mai | 3,000,000 | (Thailand) Poosit Supupramai (1) | 1.68 | |
| 9 Jul | All Thailand Partnership Trophy | Chonburi | 3,000,000 | (Thailand) Kosuke Hamamoto (2) | 2.32 | ADT |
| 16 Jul | Singha Pattaya Open | Chonburi | 4,000,000 | (Thailand) Pattaraphol Khantacha (1) | 2.42 | ADT |
| 13 Aug | Singha All Thailand Championship | Nakhon Pathom | 3,000,000 | (Thailand) Panuphol Pittayarat (2) | 1.01 | |
| 10 Sep | Singha Bangkok Open | Pathum Thani | 3,000,000 | (Thailand) Warun Ieamgaew (2) | 1.39 | |
| 8 Oct | Singha Championship | Rayong | 3,000,000 | (Thailand) Suttinon Panyo (1) | 0.61 | |
| 26 Nov | Singha Thailand Masters | Chiang Rai | 5,000,000 | (Thailand) Tanapat Pichaikool (2) | 1.22 | |
| 10 Dec | Thailand Open | Pathum Thani | 5,000,000 | (Thailand) Denwit Boriboonsub (3) | 1.85 | |

== Order of Merit ==
The Order of Merit was based on prize money won during the season, calculated in Thai baht.

| Position | Player | Prize money (฿) |
|---|---|---|
| 1 | (Thailand) Poosit Supupramai | 1,088,303 |
| 2 | (Thailand) Charng-Tai Sudsom | 1,079,671 |
| 3 | (Thailand) Panuphol Pittayarat | 1,059,959 |
| 4 | (Thailand) Denwit Boriboonsub | 1,045,538 |
| 5 | (Thailand) Natipong Srithong | 986,380 |
