= World Classic Championship =

World Classic Championship at Laguna National
Tournament information
- Location: Singapore
- Established: 2015
- Courses: Laguna National Golf and Country Club
- Par: 71
- Length: 6,935 yards (6,341 m)
- Tour: Asian Tour
- Format: Stroke play
- Prize fund: US$750,000
- Month played: November
- Final year: 2015

Tournament record score
- Aggregate: 282 Danthai Boonma (2015)
- To par: −2 as above

Final champion
- (Thailand) Danthai Boonma
- Location in Singapore

World Classic Championship at Laguna National was a golf tournament on the Asian Tour. It was played only once, from 12–15 November 2015 at Laguna National Golf and Country Club, in Singapore.

== Winners ==
| Year | Winner | Score | To par | Margin of victory | Runner-up |
|---|---|---|---|---|---|
| 2015 | (Thailand) Danthai Boonma | 282 | −2 | 1 stroke | (Malaysia) Nicholas Fung |

== See also ==
- The Championship at Laguna National
