= 2025 All Thailand Golf Tour =

Golf tour season

2025 All Thailand Golf Tour season
- Duration: 13 February 2025 – 7 December 2025
- Number of official events: 14
- Most wins: (Thailand) Tanapat Pichaikool (2)
- Order of Merit: (Thailand) Suradit Yongcharoenchai

The 2025 All Thailand Golf Tour was the 27th season of the All Thailand Golf Tour (formerly the TPC Tour), one of the main professional golf tours in Thailand since it was formed in 1999.

== Schedule ==
The following table lists official events during the 2025 season.

Date	Tournament	Location	Purse (฿)	Winner (Note: The number in brackets after each winner's name is the number of All Thailand Golf Tour events they had won up to and including that tournament.)	OWGR points	Other tours (Note: ADT − Asian Development Tour; THAPGA − Thailand PGA Tour.)
16 Feb	Singha Thailand Masters	Khon Kaen	5,000,000	(Thailand) Tanapat Pichaikool (3)	3.10	
6 Apr	Singha All Thailand Memorial	Chanthaburi	3,000,000	(Thailand) Parathakorn Suyasri (1)	3.20	
4 May	Singha Chiang Mai Open	Chiang Mai	3,000,000	(Thailand) Sahasawat Ariyachatvakin (1)	2.20	
18 May	Trang An Open	Vietnam	3,000,000	(Thailand) Kammalas Namuangruk (1)	1.32	
25 May	Singha Laguna Phuket Open	Phuket	4,000,000	(Thailand) Suradit Yongcharoenchai (2)	3.29	ADT
29 Jun	Singha All Thailand Championship	Nakhon Pathom	3,000,000	(Thailand) Tirawat Kaewsiribandit (3)	1.52	
20 Jul	Singha E-San Open	Khon Kaen	3,000,000	(Thailand) Thanaphol Charoensuk (1)	2.65	
3 Aug	Singha Championship	Rayong	3,000,000	(Thailand) Danthai Boonma (4)	2.85	
17 Aug	Singha Pattaya Open	Chonburi	3,000,000	(Thailand) Natthapatr Kaewpiboon (1)	2.45	
24 Aug	Singha-SAT MBK Championship	Pathum Thani	3,000,000	(Thailand) Poopirat Klinkesorn (1)	0.95	THAPGA
7 Sep	Singha Bangkok Open	Pathum Thani	3,000,000	(Thailand) Thanyakon Khrongpha (3)	2.20	THAPGA
9 Nov	Singha Classic	Nakhon Nayok	3,000,000	(Thailand) Thanpisit Omsin (1)	1.34	
23 Nov	Singha Thailand Masters	Chiang Rai	5,000,000	(Thailand) Tanapat Pichaikool (4)	1.82	
7 Dec	Thailand Open	Pathum Thani	7,000,000	(Malaysia) Edven Ying (1)	3.05	

== Order of Merit ==
The Order of Merit was based on prize money won during the season, calculated in Thai baht.

Position	Player	Prize money (฿)
1	(Thailand) Suradit Yongcharoenchai	1,233,485
2	(Thailand) Thanapol Charoensuk	1,164,522
3	(Thailand) Tirawat Kaewsiribandit	1,130,382
4	(Thailand) Thanpisit Omsin	995,125
5	(Thailand) Sahasawat Ariyachatvakin	917,011
