= 2017 All Thailand Golf Tour =

Golf tour season

2017 All Thailand Golf Tour season
- Duration: 23 February 2017 – 24 December 2017
- Number of official events: 12
- Most wins: (Thailand) Chanachok Dejpiratanamongkol (2) (Thailand) Chakansim Khamborn (2) (Thailand) Saranporn Langkulgasettrin (2)
- Order of Merit (men): (Thailand) Panuphol Pittayarat
- Order of Merit (women): (Thailand) Chommapat Pongthanarak

The 2017 All Thailand Golf Tour, titled as the 2017 Singha All Thailand Golf Tour for sponsorship reasons, was the 19th season of the All Thailand Golf Tour (formerly the TPC Tour), one of the main professional golf tours in Thailand since it was formed in 1999.

== Schedule ==
The following tables list official events during the 2017 season.

=== Men's events ===
Date	Tournament	Location	Purse (฿)	Winner (Note: The number in brackets after each winner's name is the number of All Thailand Golf Tour events they had won up to and including that tournament.)	OWGR points	Other tours (Note: ADT − Asian Development Tour.)
26 Feb	Singha E-San Open	Khon Kaen	3,000,000	(Thailand) Danthai Boonma (2)	n/a	
26 Mar	Singha Championship	Rayong	2,000,000	(Thailand) Chanachok Dejpiratanamongkol (1)	n/a	
9 Apr	Singha Masters	Chiang Rai	5,000,000	(Thailand) Panuphol Pittayarat (1)	n/a	
28 May	Singha Phuket Open	Phuket	2,000,000	(Thailand) Chanachok Dejpiratanamongkol (2)	6	ADT
11 Jun	All Thailand Premier Championship	Khon Kaen	3,000,000	(Thailand) Jakraphan Premsirigorn (1)	n/a	
2 Jul	Betagro All Thailand Championship	Chonburi	3,000,000	(Thailand) Tirawat Kaewsiribandit (1)	7	ADT
9 Jul	Singha Classic	Nakhon Nayok	2,000,000	(Thailand) Jazz Janewattananond (3)	n/a	
23 Jul	Singha Hua Hin Open	Prachuap Khiri Khan	2,000,000	(Thailand) Suradit Yongcharoenchai (1)	n/a	
27 Aug	Singha Chiang Mai Open	Chiang Mai	2,000,000	(Thailand) Peradol Panyathanasedh (1)	n/a	
15 Oct	Singha Pattaya Open	Chonburi	3,000,000	(Thailand) Sadom Kaewkanjana (a) (1)	n/a	
10 Dec	Thongchai Jaidee Foundation	Chonburi	4,000,000	(Thailand) Kiradech Aphibarnrat (5)	8	ADT
24 Dec	Boonchu Ruangkit Championship	Nakhon Ratchasima	4,000,000	(Thailand) Namchok Tantipokhakul (3)	8	ADT

=== Women's events ===
Date	Tournament	Location	Purse (฿)	Winner
26 Feb	Singha E-San Open	Khon Kaen	200,000	(Thailand) Kusuma Meechai (1)
26 Mar	Singha Championship	Rayong	200,000	(Myanmar) Yin May Myo (1)
9 Apr	Singha Masters	Chiang Rai	300,000	(Thailand) Pajaree Anannarukarn (a) (2)
28 May	Singha Phuket Open	Phuket	200,000	(Thailand) Saranporn Langkulgasettrin (6)
11 Jun	All Thailand Premier Championship	Khon Kaen	200,000	(Thailand) Chommapat Pongthanarak (1)
2 Jul	Betagro All Thailand Championship	Chonburi	200,000	(Thailand) Kamonwan Luamsri (1)
9 Jul	Singha Classic	Nakhon Nayok	200,000	(Thailand) Chakansim Khamborn (a) (1)
23 Jul	Singha Hua Hin Open	Prachuap Khiri Khan	200,000	(Thailand) Chakansim Khamborn (a) (2)
27 Aug	Singha Chiang Mai Open	Chiang Mai	200,000	(Thailand) Saranporn Langkulgasettrin (7)
15 Oct	Singha Pattaya Open	Chonburi	200,000	(Thailand) Nemittra Juntanaket (1)

== Order of Merit ==
The Order of Merit was based on prize money won during the season, calculated in Thai baht.

Position	Player	Prize money (฿)
1	(Thailand) Panuphol Pittayarat	1,446,800
2	(Thailand) Chanachok Dejpiratanamongkol	1,443,600
3	(Thailand) Namchok Tantipokhakul	1,358,000
4	(Thailand) Jazz Janewattananond	1,022,451
5	(Thailand) Jakraphan Premsirigorn	963,855
