= Panuphol Pittayarat =

Thai professional golfer (born 1993)

Personal information
- Nationality: Thailand
- Born: 4 February 1993 (age 33) Bangkok, Thailand
- Height: 170 cm (5 ft 7 in)
- Weight: 90 kg (198 lb)

Career
- Sport: Golf
- Turned professional: 2007
- Current tour: Asian Tour
- Former tour: Japan Golf Tour
- Professional wins: 5

Number of wins by tour
- Asian Tour: 2
- Other: 3

Achievements and awards
- All Thailand Golf Tour Order of Merit winner: 2017

Panuphol Pittayarat (Thai: ภาณุพล พิทยารัฐ; born 4 February 1993) is a Thai professional golfer who plays on the Asian Tour. He has won twice on the Asian Tour, at the Indonesia Open in 2017 and the Thailand Open in 2018. He was the 2017 All Thailand Golf Tour Order of Merit winner.

== Early life ==
Pittayarat is from Bangkok, Thailand. He began playing golf at the age of six and turned professional as a teenager.

== Professional career ==
Pittayarat turned professional in 2007 at the age of 14. He earned his Asian Tour card through qualifying school in 2011 and became a regular competitor on the tour during the 2010s.

Pittayarat had a breakthrough season in 2017. In April, he won the Singha Masters on the All Thailand Golf Tour, finishing two strokes ahead of Phachara Khongwatmai. In October, he won his first Asian Tour title at the Indonesia Open at Pondok Indah Golf Course in Jakarta, finishing on 23-under-par 265, five strokes ahead of Tirawat Kaewsiribandit. He also finished the year as the 2017 All Thailand Golf Tour Order of Merit winner.

In June 2018, Pittayarat won the Thailand Open at Thai Country Club, closing with a 70 for a 13-under-par total of 267. He finished one stroke ahead of Poom Saksansin to claim his second Asian Tour title. Following the victory, he reached a career-high 190th in the Official World Golf Ranking.

Pittayarat has also competed on the Japan Golf Tour. In August 2023, he won the Singha All Thailand Championship at Suwan Golf and Country Club, finishing one stroke ahead of Sangchai Kaewcharoen. In September 2024, he won the Singha-SAT MBK Championship at Lam Luk Ka Country Club, finishing two strokes ahead of Prom Meesawat.

== Professional wins (5) ==
=== Asian Tour wins (2) ===
No.	Date	Tournament	Winning score	Margin of victory	Runner-up
1	29 Oct 2017	Indonesia Open	−23 (68-65-67-65=265)	5 strokes	(Thailand) Tirawat Kaewsiribandit
2	10 Jun 2018	Thailand Open	−13 (67-64-66-70=267)	1 stroke	(Thailand) Poom Saksansin

=== All Thailand Golf Tour wins (3) ===
No.	Date	Tournament	Winning score	Margin of victory	Runner-up
1	9 Apr 2017	Singha Masters	−16 (70-66-69-67=272)	2 strokes	(Thailand) Phachara Khongwatmai
2	13 Aug 2023	Singha All Thailand Championship	−23 (66-66-67-66=265)	1 stroke	(Thailand) Sangchai Kaewcharoen
3	15 Sep 2024	Singha-SAT MBK Championship	−14 (65-67-68-70=270)	2 strokes	(Thailand) Prom Meesawat
