= Golf at the 2013 SEA Games =

- Venue: Royal Myanmar Golf Course
- Dates: 15–18 December

Golf in the 27th SEA Games was held at Royal Myanmar Golf Course in Naypyidaw, Myanmar from 15 to 18 December.

== Medal table ==
* Host nation (Myanmar)

Rank	Nation	Gold	Silver	Bronze	Total
1	Thailand	2	0	2	4
2	Philippines	2	0	0	2
3	Myanmar*	0	3	0	3
4	Malaysia	0	1	1	2
5	Indonesia	0	0	1	1
Totals (5 entries)		4	4	4	12

== Medal summary ==
=== Men ===
Event	Gold	Silver	Bronze
Individual	Danthai Boonma; Thailand	Gavin Green; Malaysia	Poom Saksansin; Thailand
Team	Thailand (THA); Danthai Boonma; Poom Saksansin; Natipong Srithong; Nattawat Suvajanakorn	Myanmar (MYA); Maung Maung Oo; Myo Win Aung; Thein Naing Soe; Ye Htet Aung	Malaysia (MAS); Muhammad Abdul Manaf; Gavin Green; Khai Jei Low; Abel Tam Kwang Yuan

=== Women ===
Event	Gold	Silver	Bronze
Individual	Princess Mary Superal; Philippines	Yin May Myo; Myanmar	Tatiana Wijaya; Indonesia
Team	Philippines (PHI); Katrina Pelen-Briones; Clare Amelia Legaspi; Princess Mary Superal	Myanmar (MYA); Khin Mar Nwe; May Oo Khine; Yin May Myo	Thailand (THA); Ornnicha Konsunthea; Benyapa Niphatsophon; Supamas Sangchan
