= 2023 Asian Development Tour =

Golf tour season

2023 Asian Development Tour season
- Duration: 25 May 2023 – 2 December 2023
- Number of official events: 12
- Order of Merit: (Thailand) Denwit Boriboonsub

The 2023 Asian Development Tour was the 12th season of the Asian Development Tour, the official development tour to the Asian Tour.

== Schedule ==
The following table lists official events during the 2023 season.

Date	Tournament	Host country	Purse (US$)	Winner (Note: The number in brackets after each winner's name is the number of Asian Development Tour events they had won up to and including that tournament. It is rare for someone to accumulate many wins on the Asian Development Tour as success at this level usually leads to promotion to the Asian Tour.)	OWGR points	Other tours (Note: ATGT − All Thailand Golf Tour; PGM − Professional Golf of Malaysia Tour; VGA − VGA Tour.)
28 May	Singha Laguna Phuket Open	Thailand	฿4,000,000	(Indonesia) Naraajie Ramadhan Putra (3)	2.18	ATGT
9 Jul	All Thailand Partnership Trophy	Thailand	฿3,000,000	(Thailand) Kosuke Hamamoto (1)	2.32	ATGT
16 Jul	Singha Pattaya Open	Thailand	฿4,000,000	(Thailand) Pattaraphol Khantacha (1)	2.42	ATGT
18 Aug	Indonesia Pro-Am	Indonesia	125,000	(Indonesia) Kevin Akbar (1)	1.09	
26 Aug	BNI Ciputra Golfpreneur Tournament	Indonesia	125,000	(India) Yuvraj Sandhu (1)	1.14	
2 Sep	BRG Open Golf Championship	Vietnam	100,000	(Australia) Aaron Wilkin (1)	1.31	VGA
29 Sep	OB Golf Championship	Indonesia	70,000	(Japan) Naoki Sekito (3)	1.03	
6 Oct	OB Golf Invitational	Indonesia	70,000	(Thailand) Sangchai Kaewcharoen (1)	0.95	
13 Oct	Indo Masters Golf Invitational	Indonesia	75,000	(Australia) Deyen Lawson (1)	0.92	
11 Nov	PKNS Selangor Masters	Malaysia	175,000	(Taiwan) Ho Yu-cheng (1)	1.57	PGM
18 Nov	Toyota Tour Championship	Malaysia	RM350,000	(Thailand) Suttinon Panyo (1)	1.19	PGM
2 Dec	Saudi Aramco Invitational	Saudi Arabia	250,000	(Thailand) Denwit Boriboonsub (1)	1.43	

== Order of Merit ==
The Order of Merit was based on prize money won during the season, calculated in U.S. dollars. The top 10 players on the Order of Merit earned status to play on the 2024 Asian Tour.

Position	Player	Prize money ($)
1	(Thailand) Denwit Boriboonsub	54,705
2	(Australia) Deyen Lawson	50,382
3	(Taiwan) Ho Yu-cheng	47,225
4	(England) William Harrold	42,836
5	(Australia) Aaron Wilkin	41,680
6	(Japan) Naoki Sekito	37,352
7	(Thailand) Charng-Tai Sudsom	37,269
8	(India) Yuvraj Sandhu	35,145
9	(Thailand) Pattaraphol Khantacha	34,548
10	(Malaysia) Ervin Chang	30,545
