= 2026 All Thailand Golf Tour =

Golf tour season

2026 All Thailand Golf Tour season
- Duration: 12 February 2026 – 22 November 2025
- Number of official events: 11
- Most wins: (Thailand) Charng-Tai Sudsom (2) (Thailand) Sarut Vongchaisit (2)
- Order of Merit: (Thailand) Sarut Vongchaisit

The 2026 All Thailand Golf Tour was the 28th season of the All Thailand Golf Tour (formerly the TPC Tour), one of the main professional golf tours in Thailand since it was formed in 1999.

== Schedule ==
The following table lists official events during the 2026 season.

Date	Tournament	Location	Purse (฿)	Winner (Note: The number in brackets after each winner's name is the number of All Thailand Golf Tour events they had won up to and including that tournament.)	OWGR points	Other tours (Note: THAPGA − Thailand PGA Tour.)
15 Feb	Singha E-San Open	Khon Kaen	3,000,000	(Thailand) Danthai Boonma (5)	2.53	
5 Apr	Singha Chiang Mai Open	Chiang Mai	3,000,000	(Indonesia) Jonathan Wijono (1)	1.71	
3 May	Singha Championship	Rayong	3,000,000	(Thailand) Charng-Tai Sudsom (1)	2.12	
17 May	Singha Laguna Phuket Open	Phuket	3,000,000	(Thailand) Natipong Srithong (1)	1.88	
31 May	Singha All Thailand Championship	Nakhon Pathom	3,000,000	(Thailand) Tirawat Kaewsiribandit (4)	2.07	
19 Jul	Singha Classic	Nakhon Nayok	3,000,000	(Thailand) Jakkanat Inmee (1)	2.28	
2 Aug	Singha Pattaya Open	Chonburi	3,000,000	(Thailand) Atiruj Winaicharoenchai (4)	3.58	
23 Aug	Singha-SAT MBK Championship	Pathum Thani	3,000,000	(Thailand) Sarut Vongchaisit (1)	2.27	THAPGA
30 Aug	Singha Bangkok Open	Pathum Thani	3,000,000	(Thailand) Sarut Vongchaisit (2)	2.51	
8 Nov	Singha All Thailand Memorial	Chanthaburi	3,000,000	(Thailand) Charng-Tai Sudsom (2)	1.92	
22 Nov	Singha Thailand Masters	Chiang Rai	3,000,000	(Thailand) Suteepat Prateeptienchai (2)	2.89	

== Order of Merit ==
The Order of Merit was based on prize money won during the season, calculated in Thai baht.

Position	Player	Prize money (฿)
1	(Thailand) Sarut Vongchaisit	1,218,275
2	(Thailand) Charng-Tai Sudsom	1,125,365
3	(Thailand) Tirawat Kaewsiribandit	952,038
4	(Thailand) Nopparat Panichphol	949,537
5	(Thailand) Suteepat Prateeptienchai	886,087
