= Masahiro Kawamura =

Japanese professional golfer

Personal information
- Nationality: Japan
- Born: 25 June 1993 (age 33) Mie Prefecture, Japan
- Height: 1.72 m (5 ft 8 in)
- Weight: 72 kg (159 lb; 11.3 st)

Career
- Sport: Golf
- Turned professional: 2011
- Current tour: European Tour
- Former tours: Japan Golf Tour; Asian Tour
- Professional wins: 1

Number of wins by tour
- Japan Golf Tour: 1
- Asian Tour: 1

Best results in major championships
- Masters Tournament: DNP
- PGA Championship: DNP
- U.S. Open: CUT: 2015
- The Open Championship: T39: 2018

Masahiro Kawamura (川村 昌弘, Kawamura Masahiro; born 25 June 1993) is a Japanese professional golfer who plays on the European Tour, having previously played on the Japan Golf Tour and the Asian Tour.

== Career ==
Kawamura won his first title in 2013 at the Asia-Pacific Panasonic Open on the Japan Golf Tour, a tournament also co-sanctioned by the Asian Tour.

In November 2020, Kawamura recorded his best finish to his European Tour career when he finished runner-up at the Aphrodite Hills Cyprus Showdown; one shot behind Robert MacIntyre. He also finished runner-up at the 2023 Magical Kenya Open.

== Professional wins (1) ==
=== Japan Golf Tour wins (1) ===
No.	Date	Tournament	Winning score	Margin of victory	Runner-up
1	29 Sep 2013	Asia-Pacific Panasonic Open^{1}	−9 (69-68-71-67=275)	1 stroke	(South Korea) Park Sung-joon

^{1}Co-sanctioned by the Asian Tour

Japan Golf Tour playoff record (0–1)

No.	Year	Tournament	Opponent	Result
1	2018	Mynavi ABC Championship	(Japan) Yuta Kinoshita	Lost to eagle on first extra hole

=== Asian Tour wins (1) ===
No.	Date	Tournament	Winning score	Margin of victory	Runner-up
1	29 Sep 2013	Asia-Pacific Panasonic Open^{1}	−9 (69-68-71-67=275)	1 stroke	(South Korea) Park Sung-joon

^{1}Co-sanctioned by the Japan Golf Tour

== Results in major championships ==
Tournament	2015	2016	2017	2018
Masters Tournament				
U.S. Open	CUT			
The Open Championship				T39
PGA Championship				

Tournament	2024
Masters Tournament	
PGA Championship	
U.S. Open	
The Open Championship	CUT

Did not play

CUT = missed the half-way cut
"T" = tied

== Results in World Golf Championships ==
Results not in chronological order before 2015.

Tournament	2013	2014	2015	2016	2017	2018	2019
Championship							
Match Play							
Invitational							
Champions	T50						T22

Did not play

"T" = Tied

== Team appearances ==
Amateur

- Eisenhower Trophy (representing Japan): 2010

Professional

- Amata Friendship Cup (representing Japan): 2018

== See also ==
- 2018 European Tour Qualifying School graduates
