= Golf at the 2014 Asian Games – Men's team =

Men's team at the 2014 Asian Games
- Venue: Dream Park Country Club
- Date: 25 September 2014 – 28 September 2014
- Competitors: 74 from 19 nations

Medalists
gold medal	Chinese Taipei; Kao Teng, Pan Cheng-tsung, Wang Wei-lun, Kevin Yu
silver medal	South Korea; Kim Nam-hun, Kim Young-woong, Kong Tae-hyun, Youm Eun-ho
bronze medal	Thailand; Danthai Boonma, Kasidit Lepkurte, Tawan Phongphun, Natipong Srithong

The men's team competition at the 2014 Asian Games in Incheon, South Korea was held from 25 September to 28 September at the Dream Park Country Club.

== Schedule ==
All times are Korea Standard Time (UTC+09:00)

Date	Time	Event
Thursday, 25 September 2014	07:20	Round 1
Friday, 26 September 2014	07:20	Round 2
Saturday, 27 September 2014	07:20	Round 3
Sunday, 28 September 2014	06:50	Round 4

== Results ==
Legend

- DNS — Did not start

Rank	Team	Round				Total	To par
Rank	Team	1	2	3	4	Total	To par
1st place, gold medalist(s)	Chinese Taipei (TPE)	205	203	205	206	819	−45
	Kao Teng	69	68	71	69		
	Pan Cheng-tsung	66	69	65	~~71~~		
	Wang Wei-lun	~~72~~	~~75~~	69	70		
	Kevin Yu	70	66	~~73~~	67		
2nd place, silver medalist(s)	South Korea (KOR)	205	210	202	209	826	−38
	Kim Nam-hun	67	72	66	68		
	Kim Young-woong	71	~~75~~	~~68~~	72		
	Kong Tae-hyun	~~76~~	72	68	69		
	Youm Eun-ho	67	66	68	~~76~~		
3rd place, bronze medalist(s)	Thailand (THA)	208	209	210	206	833	−31
	Danthai Boonma	70	70	67	~~71~~		
	Kasidit Lepkurte	~~72~~	69	~~73~~	69		
	Tawan Phongphun	68	70	73	71		
	Natipong Srithong	70	~~71~~	70	66		
4	China (CHN)	209	208	211	207	835	−29
	Bai Zhengkai	~~75~~	66	68	68		
	Dou Zecheng	70	70	72	69		
	Guan Tianlang	69	72	71	70		
	Zhang Jin	70	~~73~~	~~77~~	~~73~~		
5	Japan (JPN)	212	210	213	200	835	−29
	Shohei Hasegawa	70	~~73~~	71	68		
	Kenta Konishi	71	69	72	66		
	Kazuya Koura	71	70	70	~~74~~		
	Takashi Ogiso	~~77~~	71	~~74~~	66		
6	India (IND)	211	208	209	211	839	−25
	Samarth Dwivedi	~~71~~	~~73~~	~~75~~	71		
	Manu Gandas	71	69	68	71		
	Feroz Garewal	70	73	69	~~73~~		
	Udayan Mane	70	66	72	69		
7	Singapore (SIN)	211	214	215	211	851	−13
	Gregory Raymund Foo	71	71	~~73~~	~~73~~		
	Marc Ong	70	71	73	73		
	Johnson Poh	70	~~73~~	71	69		
	Jonathan Woo	~~75~~	72	71	69		
8	Malaysia (MAS)	212	223	215	214	864	0
	Wafi Abdul Manaf	~~75~~	~~78~~	72	~~72~~		
	Chan Tuck Soon	72	77	~~73~~	70		
	Low Khai Jei	69	75	70	72		
	Afif Razif	71	71	73	72		
9	Philippines (PHI)	218	221	218	214	871	+7
	Kristoffer Arevalo	~~79~~	73	74	75		
	Justin Quiban	71	74	~~75~~	~~76~~		
	Raymart Tolentino	75	~~79~~	73	72		
	Rupert Zaragosa	72	74	71	67		
10	Bangladesh (BAN)	225	222	210	219	876	+12
	Md Sajib Ali	70	74	70	72		
	Md Ismail	78	75	72	72		
	Md Nazim	77	73	68	75		
	Md Sagor	~~80~~	76	78	77		
11	Vietnam (VIE)	231	232	227	220	910	+46
	Đặng Hồng Anh	82	81	74	75		
	Đỗ Lê Gia Đạt	77	78	77	75		
	Doãn Văn Định	~~DNS~~	~~DNS~~	~~DNS~~	~~DNS~~		
	Trương Chí Quân	72	73	76	70		
12	Qatar (QAT)	227	232	229	225	913	+49
	Saleh Al-Kaabi	75	76	~~82~~	75		
	Abdulrahman Al-Shahrani	~~87~~	79	78	75		
	Ali Al-Shahrani	79	77	75	75		
	Faisal Mir	73	~~82~~	76	~~78~~		
13	Laos (LAO)	230	234	229	225	918	+54
	Thammalack Bouahom	75	79	78	79		
	Thammasack Bouahom	77	78	75	70		
	Vasin Manibanseng	78	77	76	76		
14	Nepal (NEP)	221	235	229	235	920	+56
	Tanka Bahadur Karki	73	77	75	80		
	Dinesh Prajapati	~~79~~	~~82~~	74	75		
	Bishnu Prasad Sharma	75	79	80	80		
	Tashi Tsering	73	79	~~81~~	~~86~~		
15	Macau (MAC)	227	239	240	237	943	+79
	Choi Hou Kuan	75	83	81	79		
	Tang Chak Hou	~~77~~	~~84~~	~~90~~	81		
	Xiao Jieyu	76	74	73	77		
	Yan Sihuang	76	82	86	~~82~~		
16	Oman (OMA)	236	241	235	242	954	+90
	Ahmed Al-Bulushi	~~88~~	~~92~~	83	~~89~~		
	Hamood Al-Harthi	85	91	~~84~~	84		
	Azaan Al-Rumhi	69	71	73	75		
	Ali Al-Saleh	82	79	79	83		
17	Saudi Arabia (KSA)	242	241	240	233	956	+92
	Abdullah Al-Hussain	78	78	86	77		
	Turki Al-Hussain	~~85~~	~~88~~	~~89~~	~~87~~		
	Abdulrahman Al-Mansour	83	84	79	78		
	Ali Al-Sakha	81	79	75	78		
18	Mongolia (MGL)	244	253	248	246	991	+127
	Batsaikhany Altaibaatar	85	87	84	85		
	Luvsandondovyn Dondovtseveen	76	80	79	79		
	Gangaagiin Mendsaikhan	~~90~~	~~96~~	~~94~~	~~91~~		
	Delgermaagiin Ölziidelger	83	86	85	82		
19	Kuwait (KUW)	276	288	271	270	1105	+241
	Ali Al-Ansari	92	90	97	85		
	Mazen Al-Ansari	86	94	84	84		
	Ali Marafi	98	104	90	101		
