= Kevin Yu =

Taiwanese professional golfer (born 1998)

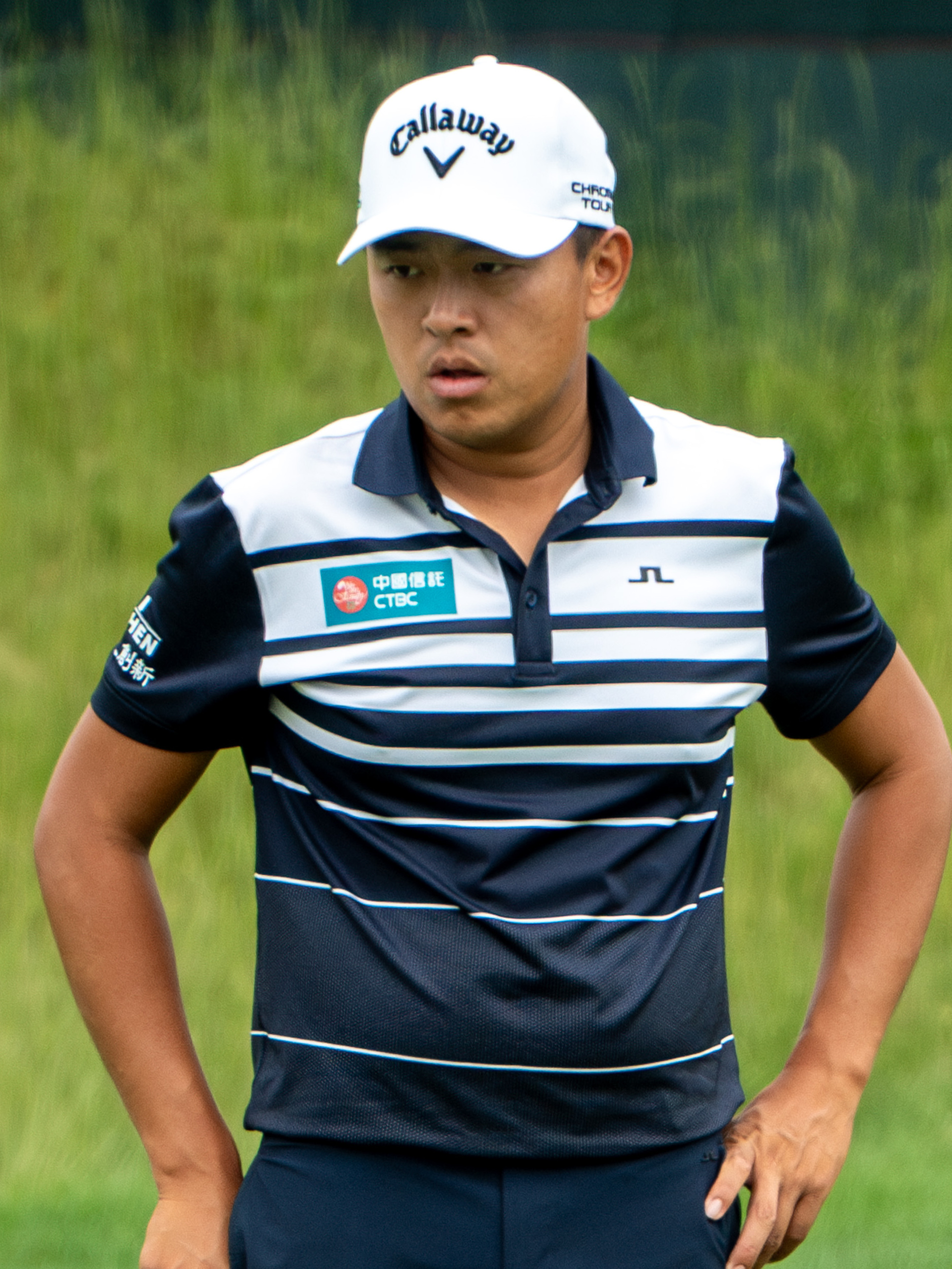
- Yu in 2025

Personal information
- Full name: Yu Chun-an
- Nickname: Kevin
- Nationality: Taiwan
- Born: 11 August 1998 (age 28) Taoyuan, Taiwan
- Height: 5 ft 9 in (175 cm)
- Weight: 180 lb (82 kg)

Career
- Sport: Golf
- College: Arizona State University
- Turned professional: 2021
- Current tour: PGA Tour
- Former tour: Korn Ferry Tour
- Professional wins: 1
- Highest ranking: 62 (8 June 2025) (as of 25 October 2026)

Number of wins by tour
- PGA Tour: 1

Best results in major championships
- Masters Tournament: CUT: 2025
- PGA Championship: T50: 2025
- U.S. Open: CUT: 2018, 2019, 2020
- The Open Championship: CUT: 2025
Medal record
Representing Chinese Taipei
Asian Youth Games
Gold medal – first place	2013 Nanjing	Boys' individual
Asian Games
Gold medal – first place	2014 Incheon	Men's team
Bronze medal – third place	2014 Incheon	Individual
Summer Universiade
Bronze medal – third place	2017 Taipei	Individual
Bronze medal – third place	2017 Taipei	Men's team

Yu Chun-an (Chinese: 俞俊安; Wade–Giles: Yu^{2} Chun^{4}-an^{1} born 11 August 1998), commonly known as Kevin Yu, is a Taiwanese professional golfer.

== Amateur career ==
Yu has represented Taiwan at multiple international competitions. He took the gold medal at the 2013 Asian Youth Games and won individual bronze and team gold at the 2014 Asian Games. He competed at the 2014 Summer Youth Olympics. He also competed at the 2017 Summer Universiade, winning bronze medals in the individual and team events. At the 2018 Asian Games, he finished fourth in the individual competition and fifth in the team competition. He has also competed at the Nomura Cup (2013, 2015), Eisenhower Trophy (2014, 2016), Bonallack Trophy (2016) and Arnold Palmer Cup (2019).

Yu played golf for Arizona State University from January 2017, winning three individual collegiate titles and finishing third, behind Matthew Wolff, in the individual competition at the 2019 NCAA Division I Men's Golf Championship. He won the Australian Master of the Amateurs in early 2019. He qualified for the 2020 U.S. Open, his third consecutive qualification in the event.

== Professional career ==
Yu turned professional in 2021. He earned status on the Korn Ferry Tour for 2021 through the PGA Tour University program. He has two top-10 finishes in his first four starts.

In October 2024, Yu won his first PGA Tour event; the Sanderson Farms Championship, winning on the first hole of a playoff against Beau Hossler.

== Amateur wins ==
- 2013 Asian Youth Games (boy's individual), Taiwan National Fall Ranking Tournament, National Middle School - Senior
- 2014 Neighbors Trophy Team Championship, National Summer Ranking - Sixth Selection Tournament, Aaron Baddeley International Junior Championship - China, Yeangder Amateur Classic Leg 5
- 2015 Western Junior, Junior Players Championship
- 2017 National Invitational Tournament
- 2018 Bandon Dunes Championship
- 2019 Australian Master of the Amateurs, ASU Thunderbird Invitational

== Professional wins (1) ==
=== PGA Tour wins (1) ===
No.	Date	Tournament	Winning score	Margin of victory	Runner-up
1	6 Oct 2024	Sanderson Farms Championship	−23 (66-66-66-67=265)	Playoff	(United States) Beau Hossler

PGA Tour playoff record (1–0)

No.	Year	Tournament	Opponent	Result
1	2024	Sanderson Farms Championship	(United States) Beau Hossler	Won with birdie on first extra hole

== Playoff record ==
Korn Ferry Tour playoff record (0–1)

No.	Year	Tournament	Opponents	Result
1	2021	TPC Colorado Championship	(United States) Tag Ridings, (England) David Skinns	Ridings won with par on second extra hole Yu eliminated by birdie on first hole

== Results in major championships ==
Results not in chronological order before 2019 and in 2020.

Tournament	2018	2019	2020	2021	2022	2023	2024	2025
Masters Tournament								CUT
PGA Championship								T50
U.S. Open	CUT	CUT	CUT					
The Open Championship			NT					CUT

Did not play

CUT = missed the halfway cut
T = tied
NT = no tournament due to COVID-19 pandemic

== Results in The Players Championship ==
Tournament	2024	2025	2026
The Players Championship	CUT	CUT	CUT

CUT = missed the halfway cut

== Team appearances ==
- Nomura Cup (representing Chinese Taipei): 2013, 2015
- Eisenhower Trophy (representing Chinese Taipei): 2014, 2016
- Bonallack Trophy (representing Asia/Pacific team): 2016
- Arnold Palmer Cup (representing International team): 2019 (winners)

== See also ==
- 2022 Korn Ferry Tour Finals graduates
