= 2025 Asian Development Tour =

Golf tour season

2025 Asian Development Tour season
- Duration: 22 January 2025 – 29 November 2025
- Number of official events: 14
- Most wins: (Philippines) Aidric Chan (2)
- Order of Merit: (Thailand) Tawit Polthai

The 2025 Asian Development Tour was the 14th season of the Asian Development Tour, the official development tour to the Asian Tour.

== Schedule ==
The following table lists official events during the 2025 season.

Date	Tournament	Host country	Purse (US$)	Winner (Note: The number in brackets after each winner's name is the number of Asian Development Tour events they had won up to and including that tournament. It is rare for someone to accumulate many wins on the Asian Development Tour as success at this level usually leads to promotion to the Asian Tour.)	OWGR points	Other tours (Note: ATGT − All Thailand Golf Tour; PGM − Professional Golf of Malaysia Tour; TWN − Taiwan PGA Tour; VGA − VGA Tour.)
25 Jan	PKNS Selangor Masters	Malaysia	200,000	(Thailand) Tawit Polthai (1)	2.36	PGM
22 Feb	Rumanza Open Pakistan	Pakistan	85,000	(Pakistan) Ahmad Baig (3)	0.61	
21 Mar	Lexus Challenge	Vietnam	90,000	(Philippines) Aidric Chan (1)	1.93	VGA
25 May	Singha Laguna Phuket Open	Thailand	฿4,000,000	(Thailand) Suradit Yongcharoenchai (1)	3.29	ATGT
31 May	Ambassador ADT	Taiwan	100,000	(Italy) Gabriele De Barba (1)	3.08	TWN
22 Jun	Morocco Rising Stars Marakesh (Samanah)	Morocco	125,000	(Philippines) Aidric Chan (2)	2.75	
29 Jun	Morocco Rising Stars Marakesh (Al Maaden)	Morocco	125,000	(Philippines) Carl Jano Corpus (1)	2.95	
23 Aug	Ciputra Golfpreneur Tournament	Indonesia	150,000	(England) Matt Killen (1)	3.40	
12 Sep	Indonesia Pro-Am	Indonesia	125,000	(Thailand) Nopparat Panichphol (2)	2.40	
10 Oct	Nam A Bank Vietnam Masters	Vietnam	90,000	(Thailand) Sarut Vongchaisit (1)	2.02	VGA
19 Oct	ADT Players Championship	Philippines	120,000	(Thailand) Waris Manthorn (1)	1.58	
1 Nov	Egyptian Open	Egypt	125,000	(Austria) Niklas Regner (1)	1.60	
7 Nov	Egypt Golf Series - Red Sea Open	Egypt	125,000	(India) Karandeep Kochhar (1)	1.53	
29 Nov	Aramco Invitational Tournament	Saudi Arabia	250,000	(Singapore) James Leow (1)	1.65	

== Order of Merit ==
The Order of Merit was based on prize money won during the season, calculated in U.S. dollars. The top 10 players on the Order of Merit earned status to play on the 2026 Asian Tour.

Position	Player	Prize money ($)
1	(Thailand) Tawit Polthai	75,315
2	(Philippines) Carl Jano Corpus	70,260
3	(England) Matt Killen	61,588
4	(Singapore) James Leow	52,630
5	(India) Karandeep Kochhar	43,508
6	(Philippines) Aidric Chan	39,790
7	(Austria) Niklas Regner	36,416
8	(England) Sam Broadhurst	36,344
9	(England) Finlay Mason	35,807
10	(Thailand) Nopparat Panichphol	34,762
