= 2020–22 MENA Tour =

Golf tour season

2020–22 MENA Tour season
- Duration: 3 February 2020 – 20 May 2022
- Number of official events: 9 (Note: A further six tournaments were cancelled.)
- Order of Merit: (England) Tom Sloman

The 2020–22 MENA Tour, titled as the 2020–22 MENA Tour by Arena for sponsorship reasons, was the ninth season of the MENA Tour.

== In-season changes ==
The schedule initially included 11 events to be played in February, March and April. The first 5 events were played as scheduled but the remaining 6 were postponed until later in 2020 due to the COVID-19 pandemic and eventually later cancelled. Following the strategic alliance formed with the Asian Tour in late 2021, four additional events were held in Thailand in May 2022, co-sanctioned with the Asian Development Tour.

== Schedule ==
The following table lists official events during the 2020–22 season.

Date	Tournament	Host country	Purse (US$)	Winner (Note: The number in brackets after each winner's name is the number of MENA Tour events they had won up to and including that tournament.)	OWGR points	Other tours (Note: ADT − Asian Development Tour.)
5 Feb 2020	Journey to Jordan 1	Jordan	75,000	(England) David Langley (1)	3	
13 Feb 2020	Newgiza Open	Egypt	75,000	(France) Sébastien Gros (1)	3	
19 Feb 2020	Ghala Open	Oman	75,000	(England) Bailey Gill (1)	3	
26 Feb 2020	Royal Golf Club Bahrain Open	Bahrain	75,000	(England) David Hague (1)	3	
4 Mar 2020	Journey to Jordan 2	Jordan	75,000	(Scotland) Ryan Lumsden (1)	3	
~~18 Mar 2020~~	Abu Dhabi Triple Crown	UAE	–	Cancelled	–	
~~26 Mar 2020~~	Troon International Pro-Am	UAE	–	Cancelled	–	
~~1 Apr 2020~~	Ras Al Khaimah Open	UAE	–	Cancelled	–	
~~8 Apr 2020~~	Northern Emirates Open	UAE	–	Cancelled	–	
~~15 Apr 2020~~	Arena Al Ain Open	UAE	–	Cancelled	–	
~~22 Apr 2020~~	Arena Championship	Jordan	–	Cancelled	–	
5 May 2022	Laguna Phuket Challenge	Thailand	75,000	(England) Tom Sloman (1)	4	ADT
10 May 2022	Laguna Phuket Cup	Thailand	75,000	(Thailand) Sarun Sirithon (n/a)	4	ADT
15 May 2022	Blue Canyon Classic	Thailand	75,000	(China) Chen Guxin (n/a)	4	ADT
20 May 2022	Blue Canyon Open	Thailand	75,000	(Thailand) Settee Prakongvech (n/a)	4	ADT

== Order of Merit ==
The Order of Merit was titled as the Journey to Jordan and was based on tournament results during the season, calculated using a points-based system.

Position	Player	Points
1	(England) Tom Sloman	28,870
2	(England) David Langley	27,557
3	(England) David Hague	26,053
4	(France) Victor Riu	18,829
5	(Scotland) Ryan Lumsden	18,290
