= 2018 All Thailand Golf Tour =

Golf tour season

2018 All Thailand Golf Tour season
- Duration: 15 February 2018 – 21 October 2018
- Number of official events: 10
- Order of Merit (men): (Thailand) Rattanon Wannasrichan
- Order of Merit (women): (Thailand) Kamonwan Luamsri

The 2018 All Thailand Golf Tour was the 20th season of the All Thailand Golf Tour (formerly the TPC Tour), one of the main professional golf tours in Thailand since it was formed in 1999.

== Schedule ==
The following tables list official events during the 2018 season.

=== Men's events ===
Date	Tournament	Location	Purse (฿)	Winner (Note: The number in brackets after each winner's name is the number of All Thailand Golf Tour events they had won up to and including that tournament.)	OWGR points	Other tours (Note: ADT − Asian Development Tour.)
18 Feb	Singha E-San Open	Khon Kaen	3,000,000	(Thailand) Rattanon Wannasrichan (3)	n/a	
25 Mar	Singha Masters	Chiang Rai	5,000,000	(Thailand) Phachara Khongwatmai (4)	n/a	
8 Apr	Singha Hua Hin Open	Prachuap Khiri Khan	2,000,000	(Thailand) Udorn Duangdecha (5)	n/a	
13 May	Singha Laguna Phuket Open	Phuket	2,000,000	(Thailand) Varanyu Rattanaphiboonkij (1)	6	ADT
27 May	Betagro Championship	Nakhon Pathom	3,000,000	(Thailand) Pavit Tangkamolprasert (2)	7	ADT
22 Jul	Singha All Thailand Championship	Chonburi	3,000,000	(Thailand) Thanyakon Khrongpha (2)	n/a	
5 Aug	Singha Championship	Rayong	2,000,000	(Thailand) Pawin Ingkhapradit (2)	n/a	
2 Sep	Singha Chiang Mai Open	Chiang Mai	2,000,000	(United States) John Catlin (1)	n/a	
14 Oct	Singha Classic	Nakhon Nayok	2,000,000	(Thailand) Kamalas Namuangruk (1)	n/a	
21 Oct	Singha Pattaya Open	Chonburi	3,000,000	(Thailand) Tirawat Kaewsiribandit (2)	n/a	

=== Women's events ===
Date	Tournament	Location	Purse (฿)	Winner
18 Feb	Singha E-San Open	Khon Kaen	200,000	(South Korea) Lee Jeong-eun (n/a)
25 Mar	Singha Masters	Chiang Rai	300,000	(Thailand) Kamonwan Luamsri (2)
8 Apr	Singha Hua Hin Open	Prachuap Khiri Khan	200,000	(Thailand) Preenaphan Poomklay (1)

== Order of Merit ==
The Order of Merit was based on prize money won during the season, calculated in Thai baht.

Position	Player	Prize money (฿)
1	(Thailand) Rattanon Wannasrichan	1,091,175
2	(Thailand) Pavit Tangkamolprasert	907,925
3	(Thailand) Pawin Ingkhapradit	858,763
4	(Thailand) Udorn Duangdecha	827,958
5	(Thailand) Phachara Khongwatmai	750,000
