= Golf at the 2013 Asian Youth Games =

- Venue: Zhongshan International Golf Club
- Dates: 18–20 August 2013

Golf at the 2013 Asian Youth Games was held in Zhongshan International Golf Club, Nanjing, China between 18 and 20 August 2013.

== Medalists ==
Event	Gold	Silver	Bronze
Boys' individual	Kevin Yu; Chinese Taipei	Manu Gandas; Independent Olympic Athletes	Danthai Boonma; Thailand
Girls' individual	Mia Legaspi; Philippines	Princess Superal; Philippines	Shi Yuting; China

== Medal table ==
Rank	Nation	Gold	Silver	Bronze	Total
1	Philippines (PHI)	1	1	0	2
2	Chinese Taipei (TPE)	1	0	0	1
3	Independent Olympic Athletes (AOI)	0	1	0	1
4	China (CHN)	0	0	1	1
4	Thailand (THA)	0	0	1	1
Totals (5 entries)		2	2	2	6

== Results ==
=== Boys' individual ===
18–20 August

Rank	Athlete	Round			Total	To par
Rank	Athlete	1	2	3	Total	To par
1st place, gold medalist(s)	Kevin Yu (TPE)	64	70	69	203	−13
2nd place, silver medalist(s)	Manu Gandas (AOI)	70	67	68	205	−11
3rd place, bronze medalist(s)	Danthai Boonma (THA)	69	69	69	207	−9
4	Lin Chang-heng (TPE)	73	69	69	211	−5
5	Liu Yanwei (CHN)	74	70	70	214	−2
6	Luo Xuewen (CHN)	72	67	76	215	−1
7	Kevin Caesario Akbar (INA)	69	70	69	218	+2
7	Solomon Emilio Rosidin (MAS)	74	72	72	218	+2
9	Ruperto Zaragosa (PHI)	76	77	68	221	+5
9	Viraj Madappa (AOI)	74	79	68	221	+5
11	Albright Chong (MAS)	70	77	77	224	+8
11	Karma Dorji Khorko (BHU)	71	76	77	224	+8
13	Ekkarat Leksuwan (THA)	79	71	76	226	+10
14	Faisal Salhab (KSA)	76	74	77	227	+11
15	Trương Chí Quân (VIE)	78	75	75	228	+12
16	Mohd Qazzri Fakhri (BRU)	79	77	79	235	+19
17	Michael Regan Wong (HKG)	75	82	82	239	+23
18	Đào Phúc Hưng (VIE)	81	80	79	240	+24
18	Leonard Ho (HKG)	76	81	83	240	+24
20	Abdulla Al-Qubaisi (UAE)	80	86	83	249	+33
21	Mansour Shakarchi (LIB)	88	83	80	251	+35
22	Afnan Mahmud Chowdhury (BAN)	93	81	80	254	+38
23	Ahmad Skaik (UAE)	88	87	80	255	+39
24	Sagi Dauletyar (KAZ)	100	88	89	277	+61
25	Dulat Sabyr (KAZ)	92	96	92	280	+64
26	Jean Michel Akkari (LIB)	95	90	96	281	+65
—	Gabriel Manotoc (PHI)	72	71	DNS	DNF	
—	Amjad Al-Toky (OMA)				DNS	

=== Girls' individual ===
18–20 August

Rank	Athlete	Round			Total	To par
Rank	Athlete	1	2	3	Total	To par
1st place, gold medalist(s)	Mia Legaspi (PHI)	66	66	69	201	−15
2nd place, silver medalist(s)	Princess Superal (PHI)	69	67	66	202	−14
3rd place, bronze medalist(s)	Shi Yuting (CHN)	70	68	67	205	−11
4	Supamas Sangchan (THA)	69	69	71	209	−7
5	Cheng Ssu-chia (TPE)	69	75	67	211	−5
6	Chang Yu-hsin (TPE)	74	70	69	213	−3
7	Benyapa Niphatsophon (THA)	72	74	68	214	−2
8	Kitty Tam (HKG)	70	76	69	215	−1
9	Ye Ziqi (CHN)	72	75	70	217	+1
10	Aditi Ashok (AOI)	74	75	70	219	+3
10	Mimi Ho (HKG)	74	69	76	219	+3
12	Gavrilla Christina Arya (INA)	72	76	73	221	+5
13	Nur Eliana Ariffin (MAS)	75	76	72	223	+7
14	Ridhima Dilawari (AOI)	72	74	79	225	+9
15	Kan Kah Yan (MAS)	74	80	77	231	+15
16	Nguyễn Thảo My (VIE)	79	82	77	238	+22
17	Liza Akter (BAN)	86	83	80	249	+33
