= 2019 Professional Golf of Malaysia Tour =

Golf tour season

2019 Professional Golf of Malaysia Tour season
- Duration: 16 January 2019 – 7 December 2019
- Number of official events: 15
- Most wins: (Malaysia) Kim Leun Kwang (2)
- Order of Merit: (Malaysia) Amir Nazrin

The 2019 Professional Golf of Malaysia Tour was the ninth season of the Professional Golf of Malaysia Tour, the main professional golf tour in Malaysia since it was formed in 2010.

== Schedule ==
The following table lists official events during the 2019 season.

Date	Tournament	Location	Purse (RM)	Winner (Note: The number in brackets after each winner's name is the number of Professional Golf of Malaysia Tour events they had won up to and including that tournament.)	OWGR points	Other tours (Note: ADT − Asian Development Tour; PTINA − PGA Tour of Indonesia.)
19 Jan	Perlis Championship	Perlis	200,000	(Malaysia) Daeng Abdul Rahman (3)	n/a	
23 Feb	Darulaman Championship	Kedah	200,000	(Malaysia) Amir Nazrin (1)	n/a	
9 Mar	Johor Championship	Johor	225,000	(Thailand) Pannakorn Uthaipas (n/a)	6	ADT
16 Mar	UMW Championship	Johor	225,000	(Japan) Kazuki Higa (n/a)	6	ADT
6 Apr	Port Dickson Championship	Negeri Sembilan	200,000	(Malaysia) R. Nachimuthu (12)	n/a	
20 Apr	Penang Championship	Penang	225,000	(Japan) Naoki Sekito (n/a)	6	ADT
22 Jun	Matchplay Championship	Selangor	200,000	(Malaysia) Rizal Amin (2)	n/a	
29 Jun	Tiara Melaka Championship	Melaka	225,000	(South Korea) Tom Kim (n/a)	6	ADT
6 Jul	Impian Championship	Selangor	200,000	(Malaysia) Ben Leong (11)	n/a	
24 Aug	Northport Championship	Selangor	225,000	(Singapore) Quincy Quek (n/a)	6	ADT
14 Sep	Sabah Championship	Sabah	225,000	(Sweden) Oscar Zetterwall (n/a)	6	ADT
21 Sep	MNRB Championship	Sarawak	225,000	(Malaysia) Kim Leun Kwang (1)	6	ADT
23 Nov	MIDF Championship	Negeri Sembilan	225,000	(Thailand) Pannakorn Uthaipas (n/a)	6	ADT
30 Nov	Maybank Championship	Selangor	225,000	(Thailand) Nirun Sae-ueng (n/a)	6	ADT
7 Dec	GlobalOne Players Championship	Negeri Sembilan	275,000	(Malaysia) Kim Leun Kwang (2)	n/a	

=== Unofficial events ===
The following events were sanctioned by the Professional Golf of Malaysia Tour, but did not carry official money, nor were wins official.

Date	Tournament	Location	Purse (RM)	Winners	OWGR points	Other tours
17 Oct	PGM IGT Championship	Indonesia	200,000	Team IGT	n/a	PTINA

== Order of Merit ==
The Order of Merit was based on prize money won during the season, calculated in Malaysian ringgit.

Position	Player	Prize money (RM)
1	(Malaysia) Amir Nazrin	151,791
2	(Malaysia) Kim Leun Kwang	148,943
3	(Malaysia) Daeng Abdul Rahman	127,259
4	(Malaysia) Sukree Othman	91,608
5	(Malaysia) Shahriffuddin Ariffin	81,663
