= Blue Canyon Country Club =

Golf course in Thailand

- Interactive map of Blue Canyon Country Club
- 8.103°N 98.328°E

Club information
- Location: Thalang district, Phuket, Thailand
- Established: 1991
- Type: Public
- Tota holes: 36
- Tournaments: Johnnie Walker Classic: 1994, 1998, 2007; Honda Invitational: 1996; Thailand Open: 2005; Blue Canyon Phuket Championship: 2021
- Website: bluecanyonphuket.com

Canyon Course
- Designed by: Yoshikazu Kato
- Par: 72
- Length: 7,179 yd (6,564 m)
- Course rating: 74.8

Lakes Course
- Designed by: Yoshikazu Kato
- Par: 72
- Length: 7,129 yd (6,519 m)

Blue Canyon Country Club is a golf facility and tournament venue in Thalang district, Phuket, Thailand. Established in 1991, the club has two 18-hole courses, the Canyon Course and the Lakes Course, both designed by Japanese golf course architect Yoshikazu Kato.

The Canyon Course has hosted several international professional tournaments, including the Johnnie Walker Classic, Honda Invitational, Thailand Open and Blue Canyon Phuket Championship. The course is particularly associated with the 1998 Johnnie Walker Classic, where Tiger Woods defeated Ernie Els in a playoff after overcoming an eight-stroke final-round deficit.

== History ==
Blue Canyon Country Club was developed in northern Phuket on land that had previously been used for tin mining and rubber plantations. The Canyon Course opened in 1991 and was designed by Yoshikazu Kato.

In 1994, the Canyon Course first hosted the Johnnie Walker Classic when Greg Norman won the tournament. In 1998, the tournament returned to Blue Canyon. Tiger Woods entered the final round eight shots behind Ernie Els but shot a final-round 65 and won in a sudden-death playoff. Golf Channel later described it as the largest final-round comeback of Woods's career.

In 2007, Blue Canyon hosted the Johnnie Walker Classic for a third time. South African golfer Anton Haig won the tournament in a three-way playoff against Richard Sterne and Oliver Wilson.

The Lakes Course opened in 1999 as the club's second 18-hole course. It was also designed by Kato and was built around lakes and former mining features.

== Courses ==
Blue Canyon Country Club has 36 holes across two courses.

=== Canyon Course ===
The Canyon Course is an 18-hole, par-72 course designed by Yoshikazu Kato and opened in 1991. The layout was developed on land previously shaped by tin mining and rubber plantations.

=== Lakes Course ===
The Lakes Course is an 18-hole, par-72 course designed by Yoshikazu Kato and opened in 1999. The course is laid out around lakes and water hazards on land associated with earlier tin-mining activity.

== Tournaments hosted ==
Blue Canyon Country Club has hosted several professional golf tournaments, including:

- Johnnie Walker Classic – The Canyon Course hosted the tournament in 1994, 1998 and 2007. Greg Norman won the 1994 edition, Tiger Woods won the 1998 edition after a playoff against Ernie Els, and Anton Haig won the 2007 edition in a three-way playoff.
- Honda Invitational – The Canyon Course hosted the 1996 edition of the Asian Tour event, won by Steve Elkington.
- Thailand Open – The Canyon Course hosted the 2005 edition, won by Richard Lee of New Zealand after a playoff against Scott Barr.
- Blue Canyon Phuket Championship – The Canyon Course hosted the 2021 Asian Tour event, won by Chan Shih-chang.

== See also ==
- Golf in Thailand
