= Golf at the 2011 SEA Games =

Golf at the SEA Games

Golf at the 2011 SEA Games was held at Jagorawi Country Club, Bogor, Indonesia.

== Medal summary ==
=== Men ===
Event	Gold	Silver	Bronze
Individual	Rattanon Wannasrichan; Thailand	Natipong Srithong; Thailand	George Gandranata; Indonesia
Team	Thailand; Natipong Srithong; Poom Saksansin; Chanachok Dejpiratanamongkol; Rattanon Wannasrichan	Indonesia; George Gandranata; Rinaldi Adiyandono; Ian Andrew; Suprapto	Malaysia; Low Khai Jei; Kenneth De Silva; Arie Irawan; Abel Tam Kwang Yuan

=== Women ===
Event	Gold	Silver	Bronze
Individual	Tatiana Wijaya; Indonesia	Pinrath Loomboonruang; Thailand	Dottie Ardina; Philippines
Team	Indonesia; Juriah; Ika Woro Palupi; Tatiana Wijaya	Thailand; Pinrath Loomboonruang; Panitta Yusabai; Pavarisa Yoktuan	Malaysia; Nur Durriyah; Kelly Tan; Aretha Pan Herng

== Medal table ==
* Host nation (Indonesia)

Rank	Nation	Gold	Silver	Bronze	Total
1	Thailand	2	3	0	5
2	Indonesia*	2	1	1	4
3	Malaysia	0	0	2	2
4	Philippines	0	0	1	1
Totals (4 entries)		4	4	4	12
