= 2017 Asian Development Tour =

Golf tour season

2017 Asian Development Tour season
- Duration: 18 January 2017 – 24 December 2017
- Number of official events: 20
- Order of Merit: (Thailand) Pannakorn Uthaipas

The 2017 Asian Development Tour was the eighth season of the Asian Development Tour, the official development tour to the Asian Tour.

== Schedule ==
The following table lists official events during the 2017 season.

Date	Tournament	Host country	Purse (US$)	Winner (Note: The number in brackets after each winner's name is the number of Asian Development Tour events they had won up to and including that tournament. It is rare for someone to accumulate many wins on the Asian Development Tour as success at this level usually leads to promotion to the Asian Tour.)	OWGR points	Other tours (Note: ATGT − All Thailand Golf Tour; PGM − Professional Golf of Malaysia Tour; PTINA − PGA Tour of Indonesia; TWN − Taiwan PGA Tour.)
21 Jan	CCM Seriemas Championship	Malaysia	RM220,000	(Australia) Martin Dive (1)	6	PGM
18 Feb	Panasonic Malaysia Championship	Malaysia	RM250,000	(United States) Brett Munson (2)	6	PGM
18 Mar	Northport Championship	Malaysia	RM200,000	(Malaysia) Ben Leong (1)	6	PGM
15 Apr	UMW Championship	Malaysia	RM200,000	(Malaysia) Nicholas Fung (3)	6	PGM
28 May	Singha Phuket Open	Thailand	฿2,000,000	(Thailand) Chanachok Dejpiratanamongkol (1)	6	ATGT
25 Jun	Taifong Open	Taiwan	160,000	(Thailand) Pannakorn Uthaipas (1)	6	TWN
2 Jul	Betagro All Thailand Championship	Thailand	฿3,000,000	(Thailand) Tirawat Kaewsiribandit (1)	7	ATGT
9 Jul	Charming Yeangder ADT	Taiwan	150,000	(Taiwan) Chang Wei-lun (1)	6	TWN
15 Jul	Darulaman Championship	Malaysia	RM200,000	(Thailand) Nattawat Suvajanakorn (1)	6	PGM
26 Aug	Ciputra Golfpreneur Tournament	Indonesia	110,000	(Japan) Masaru Takahashi (2)	6	PTINA
23 Sep	EurAsia Sabah Championship	Malaysia	RM200,000	(United States) John Michael O'Toole (2)	6	PGM
30 Sep	Labuan Championship	Malaysia	RM200,000	(South Africa) Mathiam Keyser (2)	6	PGM
7 Oct	MNRB Championship	Malaysia	RM200,000	(United States) Blake Snyder (2)	6	PGM
14 Oct	Combiphar Players Championship	Indonesia	100,000	(Venezuela) Wolmer Murillo (1)	6	PTINA
28 Oct	MIDF Championship	Malaysia	RM250,000	(Thailand) Kasidit Lepkurte (1)	6	PGM
5 Nov	Defence Raya Golf Championship	Pakistan	120,000	(Thailand) Poosit Supupramai (1)	6	
11 Nov	EurAsia Perak Championship	Malaysia	RM200,000	(United States) John Catlin (2)	n/a	PGM
25 Nov	GlobalOne Championship	Malaysia	RM200,000	(Thailand) Panuwat Muenlek (4)	6	PGM
10 Dec	Thongchai Jaidee Foundation	Thailand	฿4,000,000	(Thailand) Kiradech Aphibarnrat (2)	8	ATGT
24 Dec	Boonchu Ruangkit Championship	Thailand	฿4,000,000	(Thailand) Namchok Tantipokhakul (2)	8	ATGT

== Order of Merit ==
The Order of Merit was based on prize money won during the season, calculated in U.S. dollars. The top five players on the Order of Merit earned status to play on the 2018 Asian Tour.

Position	Player	Prize money ($)
1	(Thailand) Pannakorn Uthaipas	55,860
2	(Japan) Masaru Takahashi	48,935
3	(United States) John Catlin	46,374
4	(Taiwan) Chang Wei-lun	35,972
5	(Thailand) Nattawat Suvajanakorn	34,786
