= Jutanugarn =

Jutanugarn (Thai: จุฑานุกาล) is a surname. Notable people with the surname include:

- Ariya Jutanugarn (born 1995), Thai professional golfer
- Moriya Jutanugarn (born 1994), Thai professional golfer, sister of above
