= 2019 All Thailand Golf Tour =

Golf tour season

2019 All Thailand Golf Tour season
- Duration: 9 January 2019 – 20 October 2019
- Number of official events: 12
- Most wins: (Thailand) Kwanchai Tannin (2)
- Order of Merit: (Thailand) Itthipat Buranatanyarat

The 2019 All Thailand Golf Tour was the 21st season of the All Thailand Golf Tour (formerly the TPC Tour), one of the main professional golf tours in Thailand since it was formed in 1999.

== OWGR inclusion ==
In July 2018, it was announced that all All Thailand Golf Tour events, beginning in 2019, would receive Official World Golf Ranking points at the minimum level of 5 points for the winner of a 72-hole event.

== Schedule ==
The following table lists official events during the 2019 season.

Date	Tournament	Location	Purse (฿)	Winner (Note: The number in brackets after each winner's name is the number of All Thailand Golf Tour events they had won up to and including that tournament.)	OWGR points	Other tours (Note: ADT − Asian Development Tour.)
13 Jan	Boonchu Ruangkit Championship	Nakhon Ratchasima	4,000,000	(Thailand) Itthipat Buranatanyarat (2)	10	ADT
10 Feb	Singha E-San Open	Khon Kaen	3,000,000	(Thailand) Danthai Boonma (3)	7	
17 Feb	Thongchai Jaidee Foundation	Lopburi	4,000,000	(Thailand) Sadom Kaewkanjana (2)	6	ADT
10 Mar	Singha Thailand Masters	Chiang Rai	5,000,000	(Thailand) Prom Meesawat (6)	7	
28 Apr	Singha Chiang Mai Open	Chiang Mai	2,000,000	(Thailand) Kwanchai Tannin (2)	7	
19 May	Singha Laguna Phuket Open	Phuket	2,000,000	(Argentina) Miguel Ángel Carballo (n/a)	6	ADT
2 Jun	Singha Classic	Nakhon Nayok	2,000,000	(Thailand) Sarit Suwannarut (1)	5	
16 Jun	Singha All Thailand Championship	Nakhon Pathom	3,000,000	(Thailand) Kwanchai Tannin (3)	5	
7 Jul	Singha All Thailand Memorial	Chanthaburi	2,000,000	(Thailand) Settee Prakongvech (1)	5	
25 Aug	Singha Championship	Rayong	2,000,000	(Thailand) Tanapat Pichaikool (a) (1)	5	
13 Oct	Singha Pattaya Open	Chonburi	3,000,000	(Thailand) Kasidit Lepkurte (1)	5	
20 Oct	BG Bangkok Open	Nakhon Nayok	4,000,000	(Thailand) Panuwat Bulsombath (1)	5	

== Order of Merit ==
The Order of Merit was based on prize money won during the season, calculated in Thai baht.

Position	Player	Prize money (฿)
1	(Thailand) Itthipat Buranatanyarat	1,316,344
2	(Thailand) Kwanchai Tannin	1,262,208
3	(Thailand) Sarit Suwannarut	1,228,975
4	(Thailand) Pavit Tangkamolprasert	1,179,205
5	(Thailand) Sadom Kaewkanjana	1,059,450
