= Pavarisa Yoktuan =

Thai professional golfer (born 1994)

Personal information
- Nationality: Thailand
- Born: 3 May 1994 (age 32) Nakhon Si Thammarat, Thailand
- Height: 165 cm (5 ft 5 in)

Career
- Sport: Golf
- Turned professional: 2012
- Current tours: LPGA Tour; Epson Tour
- Former tour: China LPGA Tour
- Professional wins: 4

Best results in LPGA major championships
- Chevron Championship: T45: 2023
- Women's PGA C'ship: T37: 2019
- U.S. Women's Open: DNP
- Women's British Open: T29: 2019
- Evian Championship: T44: 2019

Achievements and awards
- Thai LPGA Tour Order of Merit: 2013
Medal record
Southeast Asian Games
| Silver medal – second place | 2011 Jakarta | Women's team |

Pavarisa Yoktuan (Thai: ปวริศา ยกทวน; born 3 May 1994) is a Thai professional golfer playing on the U.S.-based LPGA Tour.

== Early life ==
Yoktuan was born on 3 May 1994. She started playing golf at the age of 9 years old.

== Amateur career ==
Yoktuan competed for Thailand at the 2011 Southeast Asian Games in Indonesia and won a silver medal in women's team event

== Professional career ==
Yoktuan turned professional in 2012. She joined the China LPGA Tour in the following year. At the 2014 Wuhan Challenge, she won her first international title. In December 2015, she finished tied for 32nd at the final stage LPGA Qualifying Tournament to earn LPGA Tour membership for the 2016 season. She played on the Symetra Tour in 2018 season and finished third on the official money list to earn LPGA Tour card for the 2019 season.

In 2019, Yoktuan recorded her career-best LPGA Tour finish with a tied for fifth place in the Marathon Classic. At the 2019 Women's British Open, she secured her best major championship finish with a tied for 29th place.

== Amateur wins ==
- 2011 National Team Qualifying 5

== Professional wins (4) ==
=== China LPGA Tour wins (1) ===
- 2014 (1) Wuhan Challenge

=== Thai LPGA Tour wins (3) ===
- 2013 (1) 6th Singha-SAT Thai LPGA Championship
- 2014 (1) 5th Singha-SAT Thai LPGA Championship
- 2015 (1) 1st Singha-SAT Thai LPGA Championship

== Results in LPGA majors ==
Results not in chronological order

| Tournament | 2017 | 2018 | 2019 | 2020 | 2021 | 2022 | 2023 |
|---|---|---|---|---|---|---|---|
| Chevron Championship | | | | | | | T45 |
| Women's PGA Championship | CUT | | T37 | | | | CUT |
| U.S. Women's Open | | | | | | | |
| The Evian Championship | | | T44 | | | | |
| Women's British Open | | | T29 | | | | |

Did not play

CUT = missed the half-way cut
"T" = tied

== Team appearances ==
- Espirito Santo Trophy (representing Thailand): 2008
- Southeast Asian Games (representing Thailand): 2011
