= Golf at the 2013 SEA Games – Men's team =

The men's team competition at the 2013 SEA Games in Naypyidaw was held on from 15 December to 18 December at the Royal Myanmar Golf Course.

== Schedule ==
All times are Myanmar Standard Time (UTC+06:30)

Date	Time	Event
Sunday, 15 December 2013	08:00	First round
Monday, 16 December 2013	08:00	Second round
Tuesday, 17 December 2013	07:30	Third round
Wednesday, 18 December 2013	07:30	Fourth round

== Results ==
Rank	Team	Rounds				Total
Rank	Team	1	2	3	4	Total
1st place, gold medalist(s)	Thailand (THA)	210	208	204	216	838
	Poom Saksansin	~~72~~	69	69	71	
	Danthai Boonma	68	70	68	72	
	Natipong Srithong	71	69	~~71~~	73	
	Nattawat Suvajanakorn	71	~~72~~	67	~~74~~	
2nd place, silver medalist(s)	Myanmar (MYA)	212	211	209	214	846
	Ye Htet Aung	71	~~76~~	67	69	
	Myo Win Aung	70	71	72	71	
	Thein Naing Soe	71	71	70	74	
	Maung Maung Oo	~~74~~	69	~~76~~	~~74~~	
3rd place, bronze medalist(s)	Malaysia (MAS)	216	217	204	211	848
	Gavin Kyle Green	68	73	69	68	
	Abel Tam Kwang Yuan	~~75~~	~~74~~	65	70	
	Low Khai Jei	75	73	~~73~~	73	
	Muhammad Wafiyuddin Bin Abdul Manaf	73	71	70	~~76~~	
4	Singapore (SIN)	213	221	214	210	858
	Ke Jun Jonathan Woo	70	74	73	69	
	Abdul Hadi Uda Thith	71	~~75~~	~~74~~	70	
	Jerome En Yong Ng	72	75	69	71	
	Chong Chin Marc Ong	~~76~~	72	72	~~75~~	
5	Indonesia (INA)	211	216	218	219	864
	William Sjaichudin	69	72	73	71	
	Kevin Caesario Akbar	71	~~76~~	73	71	
	Jordan Surya Irawan	~~72~~	72	72	77	
	Syukrizal	71	72	~~75~~	~~78~~	
6	Philippines (PHI)	218	222	215	211	866
	Ruperto III Zaragosa	75	71	72	67	
	Justin Raphael Quiban	~~82~~	75	72	71	
	John Kier Abdon	70	76	~~78~~	73	
	Jobim Antonio Carlos	73	~~76~~	71	~~74~~	
7	Laos (LAO)	221	229	227	223	900
	Axay Luangkhamdeng	71	~~79~~	~~80~~	73	
	Thammasack Bouahom	73	73	71	73	
	Vasin Manibangeng	77	78	78	77	
	Thammalack Bouahom	~~79~~	78	78	~~84~~	
