= 2020–22 Asian Development Tour =

Golf tour season

2020–22 Asian Development Tour season
- Duration: 23 January 2020 – 25 December 2022
- Number of official events: 17
- Most wins: (Thailand) Suteepat Prateeptienchai (3)
- Order of Merit: (Thailand) Suteepat Prateeptienchai

The 2020–22 Asian Development Tour was the 11th season of the Asian Development Tour, the official development tour to the Asian Tour.

== In-season changes ==
After a two-year hiatus because of the COVID-19 pandemic, the tour resumed playing in March 2022 at the Gurugram Challenge in India. Later, the tour announced the "Beautiful Thailand Swing", which consisted of four three-day tournaments in Phuket, jointly-sanctioned with the MENA Tour. They were played in May 2022.

== Schedule ==
The following table lists official events during the 2020–22 season.

| Date | Tournament | Host country | Purse (US$) | Winner (Note: The number in brackets after each winner's name is the number of Asian Development Tour events they had won up to and including that tournament. It is rare for someone to accumulate many wins on the Asian Development Tour as success at this level usually leads to promotion to the Asian Tour.) | OWGR points | Other tours (Note: ATGT − All Thailand Golf Tour; MENA − MENA Tour; PGTI − Professional Golf Tour of India; PGM − Professional Golf of Malaysia Tour; PTINA − PGA Tour of Indonesia; TWN − Taiwan PGA Tour; VGA − VGA Tour.) |
|---|---|---|---|---|---|---|
| 26 Jan 2020 | Boonchu Ruangkit Championship | Thailand | ฿4,000,000 | (Thailand) Pavit Tangkamolprasert (7) | 7 | ATGT |
| 1 Apr 2022 | Gurugram Challenge | India | 75,000 | (United States) Dodge Kemmer (1) | 6 | PGTI |
| 5 May 2022 | Laguna Phuket Challenge | Thailand | 75,000 | (England) Tom Sloman (n/a) | 4 | MENA |
| 10 May 2022 | Laguna Phuket Cup | Thailand | 75,000 | (Thailand) Sarun Sirithon (1) | 4 | MENA |
| 15 May 2022 | Blue Canyon Classic | Thailand | 75,000 | (China) Chen Guxin (1) | 4 | MENA |
| 20 May 2022 | Blue Canyon Open | Thailand | 75,000 | (Thailand) Settee Prakongvech (1) | 4 | MENA |
| 10 Jun 2022 | OB Golf Invitational (BSD) | Indonesia | 70,000 | (Indonesia) Naraajie Ramadhan Putra (1) | 6 | PTINA |
| 18 Jun 2022 | Indo Masters Golf Invitational | Indonesia | 70,000 | (Australia) Harrison Gilbert (1) | 6 | PTINA |
| 19 Aug 2022 | Gunung Geulis CC Golf Invitational | Indonesia | 100,000 | (Thailand) Chonlatit Chuenboonngam (1) | 0.74 | PTINA |
| 27 Aug 2022 | BNI Ciputra Golfpreneur Tournament | Indonesia | 110,000 | (Thailand) Suteepat Prateeptienchai (1) | 0.88 | PTINA |
| 2 Sep 2022 | BRG Open Golf Championship | Vietnam | 75,000 | (China) Chen Guxin (2) | 0.59 | VGA |
| 16 Sep 2022 | OB Golf Invitational (Jababeka) | Indonesia | 70,000 | (Thailand) Suteepat Prateeptienchai (2) | 0.82 | PTINA |
| 23 Sep 2022 | Combiphar Players Championship | Indonesia | 100,000 | (Thailand) Suteepat Prateeptienchai (3) (Note: Prateeptienchai earned immediate promotion to the Asian Tour, as this was his third win of the season.) | 0.80 | PTINA |
| 26 Nov 2022 | PKNS Selangor Masters | Malaysia | 150,000 | (Malaysia) Shahriffuddin Ariffin (2) | 0.92 | PGM |
| 10 Dec 2022 | PIF Saudi Open | Saudi Arabia | 200,000 | (Indonesia) Naraajie Ramadhan Putra (2) | 0.98 | |
| 16 Dec 2022 | Aramco Invitational | Saudi Arabia | 125,000 | (Thailand) Varanyu Rattanaphiboonkij (3) | 0.89 | |
| 25 Dec 2022 | Taifong Open | Taiwan | 200,000 | (Taiwan) Hung Chien-yao (2) | 1.36 | TWN |

== Order of Merit ==
The Order of Merit was based on prize money won during the season, calculated in U.S. dollars. The top 10 players on the Order of Merit earned status to play on the 2023 Asian Tour.

| Position | Player | Prize money ($) |
|---|---|---|
| 1 | (Thailand) Suteepat Prateeptienchai | 86,449 |
| 2 | (Thailand) Chonlatit Chuenboonngam | 61,330 |
| 3 | (Indonesia) Naraajie Ramadhan Putra | 57,239 |
| 4 | (Malaysia) Shahriffuddin Ariffin | 51,890 |
| 5 | (China) Chen Guxin | 46,714 |
| 6 | (Thailand) Chanat Sakulpolphaisan | 45,067 |
| 7 | (Philippines) Lloyd Jefferson Go | 42,576 |
| 8 | (United States) Dodge Kemmer | 41,934 |
| 9 | (Australia) Harrison Gilbert | 41,777 |
| 10 | (Thailand) Denwit Boriboonsub | 40,191 |
