= 2021 All Thailand Golf Tour =

Golf tour season

2021 All Thailand Golf Tour season
- Duration: 4 March 2021 – 19 December 2021
- Number of official events: 9 (Note: A further two tournaments were scheduled but were cancelled.)
- Most wins: (Thailand) Sadom Kaewkanjana (3)
- Order of Merit: (Thailand) Sadom Kaewkanjana

The 2021 All Thailand Golf Tour was the 23rd season of the All Thailand Golf Tour (formerly the TPC Tour), one of the main professional golf tours in Thailand since it was formed in 1999.

== Schedule ==
The following table lists official events during the 2021 season.

| Date | Tournament | Location | Purse (฿) | Winner (Note: The number in brackets after each winner's name is the number of All Thailand Golf Tour events they had won up to and including that tournament.) | OWGR points |
|---|---|---|---|---|---|
| 7 Mar | Boonchu Ruangkit Championship | Nakhon Ratchasima | 4,000,000 | (Thailand) Poom Pattaropong (1) | 7 |
| ~~8 Aug~~ | Singha All Thailand Memorial | Chanthaburi | – | Postponed | – |
| 26 Sep; ~~25 Jul~~ | Singha All Thailand Championship | Phuket | 3,000,000 | (Thailand) Settee Prakongvech (2) | 5 |
| ~~3 Oct~~ | Singha Championship | Rayong | – | Postponed | – |
| 10 Oct; ~~31 Oct~~ | Singha Laguna Phuket Open | Phuket | 3,000,000 | (Thailand) Sadom Kaewkanjana (3) | 5 |
| 24 Oct | Singha Pattaya Open | Chonburi | 3,000,000 | (Thailand) Phachara Khongwatmai (6) | 5 |
| 31 Oct | Thailand Open | Pathum Thani | 10,000,000 | (Thailand) Sadom Kaewkanjana (4) | 5 |
| 7 Nov; ~~22 Aug~~ | Singha E-San Open | Khon Kaen | 3,000,000 | (Thailand) Phachara Khongwatmai (7) | 5 |
| 14 Nov | Singha Classic | Nakhon Nayok | 3,000,000 | (Thailand) Sadom Kaewkanjana (5) | 5 |
| 21 Nov; ~~19 Sep~~ | Singha Chiang Mai Open | Chiang Mai | 3,000,000 | (Thailand) Denwit Boriboonsub (1) | 5 |
| 19 Dec; ~~28 Nov~~ | Singha Thailand Masters | Chiang Rai | 5,000,000 | (Thailand) Kiradech Aphibarnrat (6) | 5 |

== Order of Merit ==
The Order of Merit was based on prize money won during the season, calculated in Thai baht.

| Position | Player | Prize money (฿) |
|---|---|---|
| 1 | (Thailand) Sadom Kaewkanjana | 2,542,100 |
| 2 | (Thailand) Phachara Khongwatmai | 1,615,875 |
| 3 | (Thailand) Settee Prakongvech | 1,137,900 |
| 4 | (Thailand) Denwit Boriboonsub | 888,829 |
| 5 | (Thailand) Prom Meesawat | 779,450 |
