= Suteepat Prateeptienchai =

Thai professional golfer (born 1993)

Personal information
- Nickname: Tee
- Nationality: Thailand
- Born: 7 April 1993 (age 33)

Career
- Sport: Golf
- Turned professional: 2017
- Current tours: Asian Tour; All Thailand Golf Tour; Taiwan PGA Tour
- Former tours: PGA Tour China; China Tour; Asian Development Tour; Thailand PGA Tour
- Professional wins: 12

Number of wins by tour
- Asian Tour: 4
- Other: 8

Achievements and awards
- Asian Development Tour Order of Merit winner: 2020–22
- Taiwan PGA Tour Order of Merit winner: 2024

Suteepat Prateeptienchai (Thai: สุธีพัทธ์ ประทีปเธียรชัย; born 7 April 1993) is a Thai professional golfer who plays on the Asian Tour.

== Professional career ==
Suteepat turned professional in 2017. In 2019, he got his first international title at the China Tour season finale, China Tour Championship.

In 2022, Suteepat won three tournaments on the Asian Development Tour in Indonesia, earning immediate promotion to the Asian Tour and securing the 2020–22 Order of Merit title.

In 2023, Suteepat clinched his first Asian Tour title at the Taiwan Glass Taifong Open. The later year, he claim his second Asian Tour win at the Yeangder TPC, also in Taiwan.

== Professional wins (12) ==
=== Asian Tour wins (4) ===
No.	Date	Tournament	Winning score	Margin of victory	Runner(s)-up
1	3 Dec 2023	Taiwan Glass Taifong Open^{1}	−19 (68-67-66-68=269)	4 strokes	(Malaysia) Shahriffuddin Ariffin, (Thailand) Atiruj Winaicharoenchai
2	29 Sep 2024	Yeangder TPC^{1}	−21 (64-66-68-69=267)	2 strokes	(United States) John Catlin
3	17 Nov 2024	Taiwan Glass Taifong Open^{1} (2)	−22 (67-63-68-68=266)	1 stroke	(Thailand) Runchanapong Youprayong
4	31 Aug 2025	Mandiri Indonesia Open	−24 (66-66-68-64=264)	7 strokes	(Hong Kong) Kho Taichi

^{1}Co-sanctioned by the Taiwan PGA Tour

=== Asian Development Tour wins (3) ===
No.	Date	Tournament	Winning score	Margin of victory	Runner(s)-up
1	27 Aug 2022	BNI Ciputra Golfpreneur Tournament^{1}	−21 (66-70-68-63=267)	1 stroke	(Thailand) Chonlatit Chuenboonngam, (Philippines) Lloyd Jefferson Go, (Malaysia) Paul San
2	16 Sep 2022	OB Golf Invitational (Jababeka)^{1}	−19 (64-64-67-66=261)	1 stroke	(Malaysia) Ervin Chang
3	23 Sep 2022	Combiphar Players Championship^{1}	−15 (70-65-70-68=273)	2 strokes	(Thailand) Chonlatit Chuenboonngam

^{1}Co-sanctioned by the PGA Tour of Indonesia

=== China Tour wins (1) ===
No.	Date	Tournament	Winning score	Margin of victory	Runner-up
1	1 Dec 2019	China Tour Championship	−16 (65-71-68-68=272)	Playoff	(China) Li Haotong

=== All Thailand Golf Tour wins (2) ===
No.	Date	Tournament	Winning score	Margin of victory	Runner(s)-up
1	7 Apr 2024	Singha Championship	−6 (71-69-68-70=278)	1 stroke	(Thailand) Weerawish Narkprachar, (Thailand) Atiruj Winaicharoenchai
2	22 Nov 2026	Singha Thailand Masters	−26 (67-63-67-65=262)	3 strokes	(Thailand) Chapchai Nirat

=== Taiwan PGA Tour wins (3) ===
No.	Date	Tournament	Winning score	Margin of victory	Runner(s)-up
1	3 Dec 2023	Taiwan Glass Taifong Open^{1}	−19 (68-67-66-68=269)	4 strokes	(Malaysia) Shahriffuddin Ariffin, (Thailand) Atiruj Winaicharoenchai
2	29 Sep 2024	Yeangder TPC^{1}	−21 (64-66-68-69=267)	2 strokes	(United States) John Catlin
3	17 Nov 2024	Taiwan Glass Taifong Open^{1} (2)	−22 (67-63-68-68=266)	1 stroke	(Thailand) Runchanapong Youprayong

^{1}Co-sanctioned by the Asian Tour

=== Thailand PGA Tour wins (1) ===
No.	Date	Tournament	Winning score	Margin of victory	Runner-up
1	3 Nov 2018	Singha-SAT Prachinburi Championship	−12 (68-67-71-70=276)	3 strokes	(Thailand) Kwanchai Tannin

=== TrustGolf Tour wins (1) ===
No.	Date	Tournament	Winning score	Margin of victory	Runner-up
1	24 Jun 2023	Thailand Mixed Stableford Challenge #2^{1}	71 pts (15-16-20-20=71)	3 points	(Thailand) Ekpharit Wu

^{1}Mixed event with the WPGA Tour of Australasia
