= 2020–21–22 Asian Tour =

Golf tour season

2020–21–22 Asian Tour season
- Duration: 9 January 2020 – 23 January 2022
- Number of official events: 8 (Note: A further 12 tournaments were scheduled but were either cancelled, postponed or otherwise removed from the schedule.)
- Order of Merit: (South Korea) Tom Kim

The 2020–21–22 Asian Tour was the 26th season of the modern Asian Tour (formerly the Asian PGA Tour), the main professional golf tour in Asia (outside of Japan) since it was established in 1995.

== Schedule ==
The following table lists official events during the 2020–21–22 season.

Date	Tournament	Host country	Purse (US$)	Winner (Note: The number in brackets after each winner's name is the number of Asian Tour events they had won up to and including that tournament. This information is only shown for Asian Tour members.)	OWGR points	Other tours (Note: ANZ − PGA Tour of Australasia; EUR − European Tour; JPN − Japan Golf Tour; KOR − Korean Tour; TWN − Taiwan PGA Tour.)	Notes
12 Jan 2020	Hong Kong Open	Hong Kong	1,000,000	(Australia) Wade Ormsby (3)	20	~~EUR~~	Rescheduled from 2019 (Note: The opening tournament of the season, the Hong Kong Open, was originally to be played from 28 November – 1 December 2019 as part of the 2019 season and co-sanctioned with the European Tour. However, due to protest violence, the tournament was rescheduled to January 2020 without European Tour co-sanctioning.)
19 Jan 2020	SMBC Singapore Open	Singapore	1,000,000	(United States) Matt Kuchar (n/a)	26	JPN	
1 Mar 2020	New Zealand Open	New Zealand	NZ$1,400,000	(Australia) Brad Kennedy (n/a)	15	ANZ	
8 Mar 2020	Bandar Malaysia Open	Malaysia	1,000,000	(United States) Trevor Simsby (1)	14		
~~15 Mar 2020~~	Royal Cup	Thailand	–	Cancelled	–		
~~22 Mar 2020~~	Hero Indian Open	India	–	Cancelled	–	EUR	
~~28 Mar 2020~~	Bangabandhu Cup Golf Open	Bangladesh	–	Cancelled	–		
~~19 Apr 2020~~	Maybank Championship	Malaysia	–	Cancelled	–	EUR	
~~26 Apr 2020~~	Volvo China Open	China	–	Removed (Note: Originally postponed due to the COVID-19 pandemic before being rescheduled to December 2020 as a sole-sanctioned China Tour event.)	–	EUR	
~~3 May 2020~~	GS Caltex Maekyung Open	South Korea	–	Removed (Note: Originally postponed due to the COVID-19 pandemic before being rescheduled to August 2020 as a sole-sanctioned Korean Tour event.)	–	~~KOR~~	
~~10 May 2020~~	Asia-Pacific Diamond Cup Golf	Japan	–	Cancelled	–	JPN	
~~28 Jun 2020~~	Kolon Korea Open	South Korea	–	Cancelled	–	KOR	
~~13 Sep 2020~~	Shinhan Donghae Open	South Korea	–	Removed (Note: Proceeded as a sole-sanctioned Korean Tour event.)	–	~~JPN, KOR~~	
~~20 Sep 2020~~	Mercuries Taiwan Masters	Taiwan	–	Removed (Note: Originally cancelled due to the COVID-19 pandemic before being rescheduled as a sole-sanctioned Taiwan PGA Tour event.)	–	~~TWN~~	
~~27 Sep 2020~~	Panasonic Open Golf Championship	Japan	–	Cancelled	–	JPN	
~~31 Oct 2021~~	Hero Indian Open	India	–	Cancelled	–	EUR	
28 Nov 2021	Blue Canyon Phuket Championship	Thailand	1,000,000	(Taiwan) Chan Shih-chang (3)	14		New tournament
5 Dec 2021	Laguna Phuket Championship	Thailand	1,000,000	(Thailand) Phachara Khongwatmai (1)	14		New tournament
16 Jan 2022	Singapore International	Singapore	1,000,000	(South Korea) Tom Kim (2)	14		New tournament
23 Jan 2022	SMBC Singapore Open	Singapore	1,250,000	(Thailand) Sadom Kaewkanjana (2)	14	JPN (Note: Japan Golf Tour unofficial event)	

== Order of Merit ==
The Order of Merit was based on prize money won during the season, calculated in U.S. dollars.

Position	Player	Prize money ($)
1	(South Korea) Tom Kim	507,553
2	(Thailand) Sadom Kaewkanjana	378,972
3	(Australia) Wade Ormsby	270,154
4	(Thailand) Phachara Khongwatmai	264,723
5	(Taiwan) Chan Shih-chang	231,375

== See also ==
- 2020–22 Asian Development Tour
