= Amata Friendship Cup =

Mixed-gender team golf tournament

Tournament information
- Location: 2018: Chonburi, Thailand
- Established: 2018
- Course: 2018: Amata Spring Country Club
- Par: 2018: 72
- Length: 2018: Male; 7,328 yards (6,701 m); Female; 6,469 yards (5,915 m)
- Tours: None; Friendly match
- Format: Match play
- Prize fund: US$1.2 million
- Month played: December

Current champion
- Thailand

The Amata Friendship Cup is a team golf tournament for male and female professional and amateur golfers contested by teams representing Thailand and Japan. It is the first mixed-gender team event for professional and amateur golfers with a similar format to the Ryder Cup (male event; the USA versus Europe) and Solheim Cup (female event; the USA versus Europe). The teams consist of five male professionals, five female professionals, one male amateur, and one female amateur. It was first played in 2018 at the Amata Spring Country Club which hosted the Honda LPGA Thailand on the LPGA Tour in 2006.

The current holders are Thailand who won in 2018 at the Amata Spring Country Club in Chonburi, Thailand, by a score of 15 to 13.

== Founding of the Cup ==
On 27 August 2018, it was announced by the chairman of the Board of Directors of Amata Spring Country Club, Arsa Sarasin and Senior Executive Vice President Toyota Motor Thailand, Vudhigorn Suriyachantananont, in a press conference at Grand Hyatt Erawan Bangkok, that the inaugural Amata Friendship Cup Presented by Toyota would be held at Amata Spring Country Club, Chonburi, Thailand. The first edition was contested by the teams representing Thailand and Japan for celebrating the relationship between Thailand and Japan. It used the format of the Ryder Cup and Solheim Cup, but it also included amateur golfers in the tournament.

== Format ==
The cup is played over three days. Since 2018, there have been 28 matches: eight foursomes, eight four-balls and 12 singles on the final day. This is the same format as the Ryder Cup and Solheim Cup.

Year	Day 1		Day 2		Day 3	Total Points
Year	Morning	Afternoon	Morning	Afternoon	Day 3	Total Points
2018	4 foursomes	4 fourballs	4 foursomes	4 fourballs	12 singles	28

== Captains ==
Team captains are typically recently retired men and women professional golfers, chosen for their experience and for their ability to lead a team.

== Results ==
Year	Venue	Winning team	Score	Thailand captains	Japan captains	Ref
2018	Chonburi, Thailand	Thailand	15–13	Boonchu Ruangkit (male); Virada Nirapathpongporn (female)	Naomichi Ozaki (male); Miho Koga (female)	

== See also ==
- Dynasty Cup, a men's professional team golf competition between teams representing Asia and Japan.
