= Denwit Boriboonsub =

Thai professional golfer

Personal information
- Full name: Denwit Boriboonsub
- Nickname: David
- Nationality: Thailand
- Born: 7 February 2004 (age 22)

Career
- Sport: Golf
- Turned professional: 2020
- Current tours: Asian Tour; Challenge Tour; All Thailand Golf Tour
- Former tour: Asian Development Tour
- Professional wins: 6

Number of wins by tour
- Asian Tour: 1
- Other: 5

Best results in major championships
- Masters Tournament: DNP
- PGA Championship: DNP
- U.S. Open: DNP
- The Open Championship: CUT: 2024

Achievements and awards
- Asian Development Tour Order of Merit winner: 2023

Denwit "David" Boriboonsub (Thai: เด่นวิทย์ เดวิด บริบูรณ์ทรัพย์) is a Thai professional golfer.

Denwit won three tournaments over consecutive weeks in December 2023. First, he won the Saudi Aramco Invitational on the Asian Development Tour to secure the 2023 Order of Merit title; the following week, he won the Thailand Open, and the week after he won for the first time on the Asian Tour, at the Saudi Open, where he finished three strokes ahead of Henrik Stenson.

== Amateur wins ==
- 2017 TGA–Singha Junior Golf Championship
- 2019 National Team Ranking #5, Singapore Open Amateur Championship
- 2020 National Team Ranking #1, National Team Ranking #2

== Professional wins (6) ==
=== Asian Tour wins (1) ===
No.	Date	Tournament	Winning score	Margin of victory	Runner-up
1	17 Dec 2023	Saudi Open	−18 (68-66-68-64=266)	3 strokes	(Sweden) Henrik Stenson

=== Asian Development Tour wins (1) ===
No.	Date	Tournament	Winning score	Margin of victory	Runner-up
1	3 Dec 2023	Saudi Aramco Invitational	−16 (68-70-66-68=272)	Playoff	(England) William Harrold

=== All Thailand Golf Tour wins (3) ===
No.	Date	Tournament	Winning score	Margin of victory	Runner(s)-up
1	21 Nov 2021	Singha Chiang Mai Open	−13 (67-69-71-64=271)	2 strokes	(Thailand) Sajawat Sriprasit
2	26 Jun 2022	Singha All Thailand Premier Championship	−21 (66-67-65-69=267)	1 stroke	(Thailand) Kittitee Pombunmee, (Thailand) Poosit Supupramai
3	10 Dec 2023	Thailand Open	−22 (67-62-65-68=262)	1 stroke	(Thailand) Natipong Srithong

=== TrustGolf Tour wins (1) ===
No.	Date	Tournament	Winning score	Margin of victory	Runner-up
1	14 May 2023	Thailand Mixed Cup #1^{1}	−10 (69-73-67=209) (Note: Shortened to 54 holes due to weather.)	Playoff	(Thailand) Aunchisa Utama

^{1}Mixed event with the WPGA Tour of Australasia

== Results in major championships ==
Tournament	2024
Masters Tournament	
PGA Championship	
U.S. Open	
The Open Championship	CUT

Did not play

CUT = missed the half-way cut
