= Poom Saksansin =

Thai professional golfer

Personal information
- Nationality: Thailand
- Born: 4 June 1993 (age 33)

Career
- Sport: Golf
- Turned professional: 2013
- Current tour: Asian Tour
- Professional wins: 8

Number of wins by tour
- Asian Tour: 4
- Other: 4

Best results in major championships
- Masters Tournament: DNP
- PGA Championship: DNP
- U.S. Open: DNP
- The Open Championship: T76: 2021
Medal record
Asian Games
Silver medal – second place	2022 Hangzhou	Men's team
SEA Games
Gold medal – first place	2011 Jakarta	Team
Gold medal – first place	2013 Myanmar	Men's team
Bronze medal – third place	2013 Myanmar	Men's individual

Poom Saksansin (Thai: ภูมิ ศักดิ์แสนศิลป์; born 4 June 1993) is a Thai professional golfer.

Saksansin represented Thailand at the 2010 Asian Games, the 2011 and 2013 Southeast Asian Games and the 2012 Eisenhower Trophy. At the 2011 Southeast Asian Games, he won the gold medal in the team event. At the 2013 Southeast Asian Games, he won the bronze medal in the individual event and the gold medal in the team event.

Saksansin turned professional in 2013 and played on the Asian Tour and Asian Development Tour. He won the 2015 PGM Kinrara Championship on the Asian Development Tour. He has won three times on the Asian Tour; the BNI Indonesian Masters in 2016 and 2018 and the 2017 TAKE Solutions Masters.

== Amateur wins ==
- 2010 Thailand Stroke Play, Putra Cup

== Professional wins (8) ==
=== Asian Tour wins (4) ===
Legend
Flagship events (1)
Other Asian Tour (3)

No.	Date	Tournament	Winning score	Margin of victory	Runner(s)-up
1	9 Oct 2016	BNI Indonesian Masters	−18 (69-69-65-67=270)	5 strokes	(Japan) Masahiro Kawamura, (Thailand) Phachara Khongwatmai, (Thailand) Suradit Yongcharoenchai
2	6 Aug 2017	TAKE Solutions Masters^{1}	−16 (64-67-70-67=268)	2 strokes	(India) Khalin Joshi
3	16 Dec 2018	BNI Indonesian Masters (2)	−20 (67-63-70-68=268)	3 strokes	(Thailand) Jazz Janewattananond
4	24 Sep 2023	Yeangder TPC^{2}	−24 (68-66-64-66=264)	3 strokes	(Australia) Travis Smyth

^{1}Co-sanctioned by the Professional Golf Tour of India
^{2}Co-sanctioned by the Taiwan PGA Tour

=== Asian Development Tour wins (1) ===
No.	Date	Tournament	Winning score	Margin of victory	Runner-up
1	23 Oct 2015	Kinrara Championship^{1}	−12 (67-67-64=198)	1 stroke	(Philippines) Mars Pucay

^{1}Co-sanctioned by the Professional Golf of Malaysia Tour

=== All Thailand Golf Tour wins (2) ===
No.	Date	Tournament	Winning score	Margin of victory	Runner-up
1	23 Feb 2014 (2013 season)	Singha Masters	−16 (69-68-66-69=272)	Playoff	(Thailand) Pavit Tangkamolprasert
2	20 Nov 2022	Singha Thailand Masters	−18 (68-68-68-66=270)	Playoff	(Thailand) Witchayapat Sinsrang

=== Thailand PGA Tour wins (1) ===
No.	Date	Tournament	Winning score	Margin of victory	Runner-up
1	15 Jul 2017	Singha-SAT Nakhon Nayok Classic	−17 (66-69-69-66=267)	Playoff	(Thailand) Tirawat Kaewsiribandit

== Results in major championships ==
Tournament	2021
Masters Tournament	
PGA Championship	
U.S. Open	
The Open Championship	T76

Did not play

"T" = tied

== Results in World Golf Championships ==
Tournament	2017	2018	2019
Championship			
Match Play			
Invitational			T58
Champions	T24		

Did not play

"T" = Tied

== Team appearances ==
Amateur

- Asian Games (representing Thailand): 2010
- Southeast Asian Games (representing Thailand): 2011 (winners), 2013 (winners)
- Eisenhower Trophy (representing Thailand): 2012

Professional

- EurAsia Cup (representing Asia): 2018
