= Suradit Yongcharoenchai =

Thai golfer

Personal information
- Nickname: Art
- Nationality: Thailand
- Born: 28 October 1998 (age 28) Nakhon Pathom ,Thailand

Career
- Sport: Golf
- Turned professional: 2015
- Current tours: Asian Development Tour; All Thailand Golf Tour
- Former tours: European Tour; Asian Tour
- Professional wins: 4

Number of wins by tour
- Asian Tour: 1
- Other: 3

Achievements and awards
- All Thailand Golf Tour Order of Merit winner: 2025

Suradit Yongcharoenchai (Thai: สุรดิษ ยงค์เจริญชัย; born 28 October 1998) is a Thai professional golfer who plays on the European Tour and Asian Tour. Yongcharoenchai turned professional in 2015 when he was 17. He got his first win on the Asian Tour at the Mercuries Taiwan Masters in October 2019.

== Amateur wins ==
- 2013 TGA-CAT Junior Ranking 6, TGA-Singha Junior Ranking 2, Zhang Lian Wei Cup, Sports Hero, TGA-Singha Junior Ranking 3, Thailand Amateur Open, TGA-Singha Junior Championship, Singha Thailand Junior World Championships, Asia Pacific Junior Championship
- 2014 Lion City Cup

== Professional wins (4) ==
=== Asian Tour wins (1) ===
No.	Date	Tournament	Winning score	Margin of victory	Runners-up
1	6 Oct 2019	Mercuries Taiwan Masters^{1}	−10 (71-69-68-70=278)	1 stroke	(Brazil) Adilson da Silva, (India) Ajeetesh Sandhu, (Philippines) Miguel Tabuena

^{1}Co-sanctioned by the Taiwan PGA Tour

=== Asian Development Tour wins (1) ===
No.	Date	Tournament	Winning score	Margin of victory	Runners-up
1	25 May 2025	Singha Laguna Phuket Open^{1}	−17 (61-67-65=193) (Note: Shortened to 54 holes due to weather.)	9 strokes	(Thailand) Thanpisit Omsin, (Bangladesh) Siddikur Rahman, (Thailand) Nirun Sae-ueng

^{1}Co-sanctioned by the All Thailand Golf Tour

=== All Thailand Golf Tour wins (2) ===
No.	Date	Tournament	Winning score	Margin of victory	Runners-up
1	23 Jul 2017	Singha Hua Hin Open	−16 (68-70-62-68=268)	2 strokes	(Thailand) Jazz Janewattananond, (Thailand) Chawalit Plaphol
2	25 May 2025	Singha Laguna Phuket Open^{1}	−17 (61-67-65=193)	9 strokes	(Thailand) Thanpisit Omsin, (Bangladesh) Siddikur Rahman, (Thailand) Nirun Sae-ueng

^{1}Co-sanctioned by the Asian Development Tour

=== Thailand PGA Tour wins (1) ===
No.	Date	Tournament	Winning score	Margin of victory	Runners-up
1	13 May 2023	Singha-SAT Cha-am Championship	−16 (64-65-72-63=264)	2 strokes	(Thailand) Prom Meesawat, (Thailand) Sarun Sirithon

== Team appearances ==
Amateur

- Eisenhower Trophy (representing Thailand): 2014
