= Virada Nirapathpongporn =

Thai professional golfer (born 1982)

Virada Nirapathpongporn วิรดา นิราพาธพงศ์พร
Personal information
- Nationality: Thailand
- Born: 21 April 1982 (age 44) Bangkok, Thailand
- Height: 5 ft 3 in (1.60 m)

Career
- Sport: Golf
- College: Duke University
- Turned professional: 2004
- Former tours: LPGA Tour (2006–08); Futures Tour (2004–10)
- Professional wins: 2

Number of wins by tour
- Epson Tour: 2

Best results in LPGA major championships
- Chevron Championship: T21: 2003
- Women's PGA C'ship: T74: 2007
- U.S. Women's Open: CUT: 2002-06, 2008
- Women's British Open: CUT: 2006

Achievements and awards
- Honda Sports Award: 2002

Virada Nirapathpongporn (Thai: วิรดา นิราพาธพงศ์พร, born 21 April 1982) is a Thai professional golfer. She is best known for winning the 2003 U.S. Women's Amateur.

== Early life and amateur career ==
In 1982, Nirapathpongporn was born in Bangkok, Thailand.

In 2000, she began attending Duke University. She won the 2002 NCAA Division I Championship. She graduated in 2004 with BA degree in psychology. She was voted the 2004 Nancy Lopez Award as the world's top female amateur. She was also runner-up in the 2003 U.S. Women's Amateur Public Links.

== Professional career ==
Nirapathpongporn turned professional in June 2004 to play on the Futures Tour. In 2005, she won two tournaments. In 2006, she was an LPGA Tour rookie and wrote a blog for lpga.com.

In late February 2011, Nirapathpongporn announced she would be retiring from competitive golf and moving back to Thailand after living in the United States for fifteen years.

== Awards and honors ==
In 2002, she won the Honda Sports Award as the best female collegiate golfer in the nation.

== Amateur wins ==
- 2001 Women's Trans-National Championship
- 2002 NCAA Division I Championship
- 2003 U.S. Women's Amateur

== Professional wins (2) ==
=== Futures Tour wins (2) ===
- 2005 (2) Jalapeno FUTURES Golf Classic, CIGNA Chip in For A Cure Connecticut FUTURES Golf Classic

== Team appearances ==
Amateur

- Queen Sirikit Cup (representing Thailand): 1997
