= Natipong Srithong =

Thai professional golfer (born 1993)

Personal information
- Nationality: Thailand
- Born: 1 October 1993 (age 33)

Career
- Sport: Golf
- Turned professional: 2015
- Current tours: Asian Tour; All Thailand Golf Tour; Thailand PGA Tour
- Professional wins: 3

Number of wins by tour
- Asian Tour: 1
- Other: 2

Achievements and awards
- Asian Tour Rookie of the Year: 2015
Medal record
Asian Games
Bronze medal – third place	2014 Incheon	Men's team
Summer Universiade
Bronze medal – third place	2015 Gwangju	Individual
SEA Games
Gold medal – first place	2011 Jakarta	Team
Gold medal – first place	2013 Myanmar	Team
Gold medal – first place	2015 Singapore	Individual
Gold medal – first place	2015 Singapore	Team
Silver medal – second place	2011 Jakarta	Individual

Natipong Srithong (born 1 October 1993) is a Thai professional golfer.

== Amateur career ==
As an amateur, Srithong won two tournaments in Asia. He also competed in several multi-sport events winning the following medals:

Games	Event	Medal
2011 SEA Games	Men's individual	Silver
2011 SEA Games	Men's team	Gold
2013 SEA Games	Men's team	Gold
2014 Asian Games	Men's team	Bronze
2015 SEA Games	Men's individual	Gold
2015 SEA Games	Men's team	Gold
2015 Summer Universiade	Men's individual	Bronze

== Professional career ==
Srithong turned professional in 2015 and began playing on the Asian Tour, winning the Resorts World Manila Masters in November.

== Amateur wins ==
- 2011 Indonesia Amateur Open, Singha Thailand Open

== Professional wins (3) ==
=== Asian Tour wins (1) ===
No.	Date	Tournament	Winning score	Margin of victory	Runner-up
1	22 Nov 2015	Resorts World Manila Masters	−15 (71-69-66-67=273)	1 stroke	(South Africa) Jbe' Kruger

=== All Thailand Golf Tour wins (1) ===
No.	Date	Tournament	Winning score	Margin of victory	Runner-up
1	17 May 2026	Singha Laguna Phuket Open	−15 (65-64-67-69=265)	2 strokes	(Thailand) Nopparat Panichphol

=== Thailand PGA Tour wins (1) ===
No.	Date	Tournament	Winning score	Margin of victory	Runners-up
1	10 May 2025	Singha-SAT Chachoengsao Championship	−12 (64-70-68-66=268)	1 stroke	(Thailand) Tudpong Chutimaphorn, (Thailand) Kittiphong Phaithuncharoensuk

== Team appearances ==
Amateur

- SEA Games (representing Thailand): 2011 (winners), 2013 (winners), 2015 (winners)
- Bonallack Trophy (representing Asia/Pacific): 2012
- Asian Games (representing Thailand): 2014
