= List of Asian Games medalists in golf =

Asian Games medalists

This is the complete list of Asian Games medalists in golf from 1982 to 2026.

== Men ==
=== Individual ===
Games	Gold	Silver	Bronze
1982 New Delhi	Lakshman Singh (IND)	Rajiv Mohta (IND)	Tetsuo Sakata (JPN)
1986 Seoul	Ramon Brobio (PHI)	Kim Ki-sub (KOR)	Takahiro Nakagawa (JPN)
1990 Beijing	Shigeki Maruyama (JPN)	Nandasena Perera (SRI)	Ramon Brobio (PHI)
1994 Hiroshima	Kaname Yokoo (JPN)	Zhang Lianwei (CHN)	Hong Chia-yuh (TPE)
1998 Bangkok	Tomohiro Kondo (JPN)	Gerald Rosales (PHI)	Hidemasa Hoshino (JPN)
2002 Busan	Shiv Kapur (IND)	Anura Rohana (SRI)	Kim Hyun-woo (KOR)
2006 Doha	Kim Kyung-tae (KOR)	Pan Cheng-tsung (TPE)	Michael Bibat (PHI)
2010 Guangzhou	Kim Meen-whee (KOR)	Miguel Tabuena (PHI)	Hung Chien-yao (TPE)
2014 Incheon	Pan Cheng-tsung (TPE)	Kim Nam-hun (KOR)	Kevin Yu (TPE)
2018 Jakarta–Palembang	Keita Nakajima (JPN)	Oh Seung-taek (KOR)	Jin Cheng (CHN)
2022 Hangzhou	Kho Taichi (HKG)	Im Sung-jae (KOR)	Hung Chien-yao (TPE)
2026 Aichi–Nagoya	Kim Joo-hyung (KOR)	Kazuki Higa (JPN)	Sadom Kaewkanjana (THA)

=== Team ===
Games	Gold	Silver	Bronze
1982 New Delhi	India (IND); Amit Luthra; Rajiv Mohta; Rishi Narain; Lakshman Singh	South Korea (KOR); Kim Byung-hoon; Kim Joo-heun; Kim Ki-sub; Kim Sung-ho	Japan (JPN); Noriaki Kimura; Masayuki Naito; Kiyotaka Oie; Tetsuo Sakata
1986 Seoul	South Korea (KOR); Kim Jong-pil; Kim Ki-sub; Kim Sung-ho; Kwak Yu-hyun	Japan (JPN); Takahiro Nakagawa; Tomio Otomo; Tetsuo Sakata; Tsuyoshi Yoneyama	Philippines (PHI); Ramon Brobio; Robert Pactolerin; Wilfredo Victoria; Carito Villaroman
1990 Beijing	Japan (JPN); Katsunori Kuwabara; Shigeki Maruyama; Taro Okabe; Kazuyoshi Yonekura	Philippines (PHI); Ramon Brobio; Felix Casas; Vince Lauron; Danilo Zarate	South Korea (KOR); Ahn Joo-hwan; Han Young-kun; Min Hye-sik; Oh Jin-kun
1994 Hiroshima	Japan (JPN); Reiji Kojima; Kiyotake Oie; Taro Okabe; Kaname Yokoo	Chinese Taipei (TPE); Chang Tse-peng; Hong Chia-yuh; Lai Ying-juh; Yeh Wei-tze	South Korea (KOR); Ahn Joo-hwan; Hu Suk-ho; Kim Chang-min; Kim Jong-chul
1998 Bangkok	Japan (JPN); Hidemasa Hoshino; Tomohiro Kondo; Yusaku Miyazato; Hideto Tanihara	Philippines (PHI); Cookie La'O; Rhey Luna; Angelo Que; Gerald Rosales	Chinese Taipei (TPE); Chan Yih-shin; Hong Chai-yuh; Lee Cho-chuan; Su Chin-jung
2002 Busan	Chinese Taipei (TPE); Chang Hong-wei; Cheng Chen-liang; Kao Bo-song; Sung Mao-chang	South Korea (KOR); Kim Byung-kwan; Kim Hyun-woo; Kwon Ki-taek; Sung Si-woo	Japan (JPN); Toyokazu Fujishima; Futoshi Fujita; Riki Ikeda; Yusaku Miyazato
2006 Doha	South Korea (KOR); Kang Sung-hoon; Kim Do-hoon; Kim Do-hoon; Kim Kyung-tae	India (IND); Gaganjeet Bhullar; Joseph Chakola; Chiragh Kumar; Anirban Lahiri	Chinese Taipei (TPE); Chan Shih-chang; Chiang Chen-chih; Pan Cheng-tsung; Pan Fu-chiang
2010 Guangzhou	South Korea (KOR); Kim Meen-whee; Lee Jae-hyeok; Lee Kyoung-hoon; Park Il-hwan	India (IND); Rahul Bajaj; Abhijit Singh Chadha; Rashid Khan; Abhinav Lohan	Chinese Taipei (TPE); Hsieh Chi-hsien; Huang Tao; Hung Chien-yao; Yang Fei-hao
2014 Incheon	Chinese Taipei (TPE); Kao Teng; Pan Cheng-tsung; Wang Wei-lun; Kevin Yu	South Korea (KOR); Kim Nam-hun; Kim Young-woong; Kong Tae-hyun; Youm Eun-ho	Thailand (THA); Danthai Boonma; Kasidit Lepkurte; Tawan Phongphun; Natipong Srithong
2018 Jakarta–Palembang	Japan (JPN); Daiki Imano; Takumi Kanaya; Keita Nakajima; Ren Yonezawa	China (CHN); Chen Yilong; Jin Cheng; Yuan Yechun; Zhang Huachuang	South Korea (KOR); Choi Ho-young; Jang Seung-bo; Kim Dong-min; Oh Seung-taek
2022 Hangzhou	South Korea (KOR); Kim Si-woo; Jang Yu-bin; Im Sung-jae; Cho Woo-young	Thailand (THA); Phachara Khongwatmai; Atiruj Winaicharoenchai; Danthai Boonma; Poom Saksansin	Hong Kong (HKG); Hak Shun-yat; Matthew Cheung Hung-hai; Kho Taichi; Ng Shing Fung
2026 Aichi–Nagoya	China (CHN); Ding Wenyi; Jin Zihao; Zheng Yunhe	South Korea (KOR); Kim Joo-hyung; Mun Do-yeob; Kim Seong-hyeon	Japan (JPN); Kazuki Higa; Taishi Moto; Keita Nakajima

== Women ==
=== Individual ===
Games	Gold	Silver	Bronze
1990 Beijing	Won Jae-sook (KOR)	Lee Jong-im (KOR)	Jamille Jose (PHI)
1994 Hiroshima	Huang Yu-chen (TPE)	Kang Soo-yun (KOR)	Song Chae-eun (KOR)
1998 Bangkok	Lu Hsiao-chuan (TPE)	Wei Yun-jye (TPE)	Jang Jeong (KOR)
2002 Busan	Ai Miyazato (JPN)	Kim Joo-mi (KOR)	Park Won-mi (KOR)
2006 Doha	Ryu So-yeon (KOR)	Mika Miyazato (JPN)	Choi He-yong (KOR)
2010 Guangzhou	Kim Hyun-soo (KOR)	Yan Jing (CHN)	Kim Ji-hee (KOR)
2014 Incheon	Park Gyeol (KOR)	Budsabakorn Sukapan (THA)	Supamas Sangchan (THA)
2018 Jakarta–Palembang	Yuka Saso (PHI)	Liu Wenbo (CHN)	Bianca Pagdanganan (PHI)
2022 Hangzhou	Arpichaya Yubol (THA)	Aditi Ashok (IND)	Yoo Hyun-jo (KOR)
2026 Aichi–Nagoya	Pranavi Urs (IND)	Yin Ruoning (CHN)	Shannon Tan (SGP)

=== Team ===
Games	Gold	Silver	Bronze
1990 Beijing	South Korea (KOR); Lee Jong-im; Shin So-ra; Won Jae-sook; Yeom Sung-mi	Chinese Taipei (TPE); Huang Hui-fan; Huang Yu-chen; Lien Pay-fen; Tseng Hsiu-feng	Philippines (PHI); Ruby Chico; Yvette de Leon; Mary Grace Estuesta; Jamille Jose
1994 Hiroshima	Chinese Taipei (TPE); Chang Chin-sha; Huang Yu-chen; Lee Jui-hui	South Korea (KOR); Han Hee-won; Kang Soo-yun; Song Chae-eun	China (CHN); Huang Lixia; Lin Shaoru
1998 Bangkok	Chinese Taipei (TPE); Lin Yu-ping; Lu Hsiao-chuan; Wei Yun-jye	South Korea (KOR); Cho Kyung-heeyu; Jang Jeong; Kim Ju-yun	Philippines (PHI); Dorothy Delasin; Ria Quiazon; Jennifer Rosales
2002 Busan	South Korea (KOR); Kim Joo-mi; Park Won-mi; Yim Sung-ah	Japan (JPN); Ai Miyazato; Ayako Uehara; Sakura Yokomine	Philippines (PHI); Heidi Chua; Ria Quiazon; Carmelette Villaroman
2006 Doha	South Korea (KOR); Choi He-yong; Chung Jae-eun; Ryu So-yeon	Japan (JPN); Erina Hara; Mika Miyazato; Miki Saiki	Chinese Taipei (TPE); Lu Kwan-chih; Tseng Ya-ni; Yu Pei-lin
2010 Guangzhou	South Korea (KOR); Han Jung-eun; Kim Hyun-soo; Kim Ji-hee	China (CHN); Li Jiayun; Lin Xiyu; Yan Jing	Chinese Taipei (TPE); Hsu Ke-hui; Liu Yi-chen; Yao Hsuan-yu
2014 Incheon	Thailand (THA); Benyapa Niphatsophon; Supamas Sangchan; Budsabakorn Sukapan	South Korea (KOR); Choi Hye-jin; Lee So-young; Park Gyeol	China (CHN); Shi Yuting; Wang Xinying; Ye Ziqi
2018 Jakarta–Palembang	Philippines (PHI); Lois Kaye Go; Bianca Pagdanganan; Yuka Saso	South Korea (KOR); Jeong Yun-ji; Lim Hee-jeong; Ryu Hae-ran	China (CHN); Du Mohan; Liu Wenbo; Yin Ruoning
2022 Hangzhou	Thailand (THA); Eila Galitsky; Patcharajutar Kongkraphan; Arpichaya Yubol	South Korea (KOR); Yoo Hyun-jo; Lim Ji-yoo; Kim Min-sol	China (CHN); Yin Ruoning; Liu Yu; Lin Xiyu
2026 Aichi–Nagoya	China (CHN); Liu Yan; Yin Ruoning; Zhang Weiwei	India (IND); Aditi Ashok; Diksha Dagar; Pranavi Urs	Chinese Taipei (TPE); Pei-Yun Chien; Hsu Wei-ling; Yani Tseng
