= Golf at the Asian Games =

- Governing bodies: IGF (World) / APGC (Asia)
- Events: 4 (men: 2; women: 2)

Games
- 1951; 1954; 1958; 1962; 1966; 1970; 1974; 1978; 1982; 1986; 1990; 1994; 1998; 2002; 2006; 2010; 2014; 2018; 2022; 2026
- Medalists

Golf was an event at the Asian Games for the first time in 1982, when the Games were held in New Delhi, India.

== Editions ==
Games	Year	Host city	Best nation
IX	1982	New Delhi, India	India
X	1986	Seoul, South Korea	South Korea
XI	1990	Beijing, China	South Korea
XII	1994	Hiroshima, Japan	Chinese Taipei
XIII	1998	Bangkok, Thailand	Chinese Taipei
XIV	2002	Busan, South Korea	South Korea
XV	2006	Doha, Qatar	South Korea
XVI	2010	Guangzhou, China	South Korea
XVII	2014	Incheon, South Korea	Chinese Taipei
XVIII	2018	Jakarta–Palembang, Indonesia	Philippines
XIX	2022	Hangzhou, China	Thailand
XX	2026	Aichi–Nagoya, Japan	China

== Events ==
Event	82	86	90	94	98	02	06	10	14	18	22	26	Years
Men's individual	X	X	X	X	X	X	X	X	X	X	X	X	12
Men's team	X	X	X	X	X	X	X	X	X	X	X	X	12
Women's individual			X	X	X	X	X	X	X	X	X	X	10
Women's team			X	X	X	X	X	X	X	X	X	X	10
Total	2	2	4	4	4	4	4	4	4	4	4	4	44

== Medal table ==
Rank	Nation	Gold	Silver	Bronze	Total
1	South Korea (KOR)	15	16	10	41
2	Japan (JPN)	9	5	6	20
3	Chinese Taipei (TPE)	7	4	10	21
4	India (IND)	4	5	0	9
5	Philippines (PHI)	3	4	8	15
6	Thailand (THA)	3	2	3	8
7	China (CHN)	2	1	5	8
8	Hong Kong (HKG)	1	0	1	2
9	Sri Lanka (SRI)	0	2	0	2
10	Singapore (SGP)	0	0	1	1
Totals (10 entries)		44	39	44	127
