= Golf at the 2014 Asian Games =

- Venue: Dream Park Country Club
- Dates: 25–28 September
- Competitors: 114 from 24 nations

Golf at the 2014 Asian Games was held in Incheon, South Korea from 25 to 28 September 2014. Four competitions were held in both, men and women's.

== Medalists ==
Event	Gold	Silver	Bronze
Men's individual	Pan Cheng-tsung; Chinese Taipei	Kim Nam-hun; South Korea	Kevin Yu; Chinese Taipei
Men's team	Chinese Taipei; Kao Teng; Pan Cheng-tsung; Wang Wei-lun; Kevin Yu	South Korea; Kim Nam-hun; Kim Young-woong; Kong Tae-hyun; Youm Eun-ho	Thailand; Danthai Boonma; Kasidit Lepkurte; Tawan Phongphun; Natipong Srithong
Women's individual	Park Gyeol; South Korea	Budsabakorn Sukapan; Thailand	Supamas Sangchan; Thailand
Women's team	Thailand; Benyapa Niphatsophon; Supamas Sangchan; Budsabakorn Sukapan	South Korea; Choi Hye-jin; Lee So-young; Park Gyeol	China; Shi Yuting; Wang Xinying; Ye Ziqi

== Medal table ==
Rank	Nation	Gold	Silver	Bronze	Total
1	Chinese Taipei	2	0	1	3
2	South Korea	1	3	0	4
3	Thailand	1	1	2	4
4	China	0	0	1	1
Totals (4 entries)		4	4	4	12

== Participating nations ==
A total of 114 athletes from 24 nations competed in golf at the 2014 Asian Games:

- Afghanistan (2)
- Bangladesh (4)
- Bhutan (1)
- China (7)
- Chinese Taipei (7)
- Hong Kong (3)
- India (7)
- Japan (7)
- Kazakhstan (5)
- Kuwait (4)
- Kyrgyzstan (1)
- Laos (3)
- Macau (6)
- Malaysia (4)
- Mongolia (7)
- Nepal (4)
- Oman (4)
- Philippines (7)
- Qatar (4)
- Saudi Arabia (4)
- Singapore (4)
- South Korea (7)
- Thailand (7)
- Vietnam (5)
