= Dorothy Delasin =

Filipino-American professional golfer (born 1980)

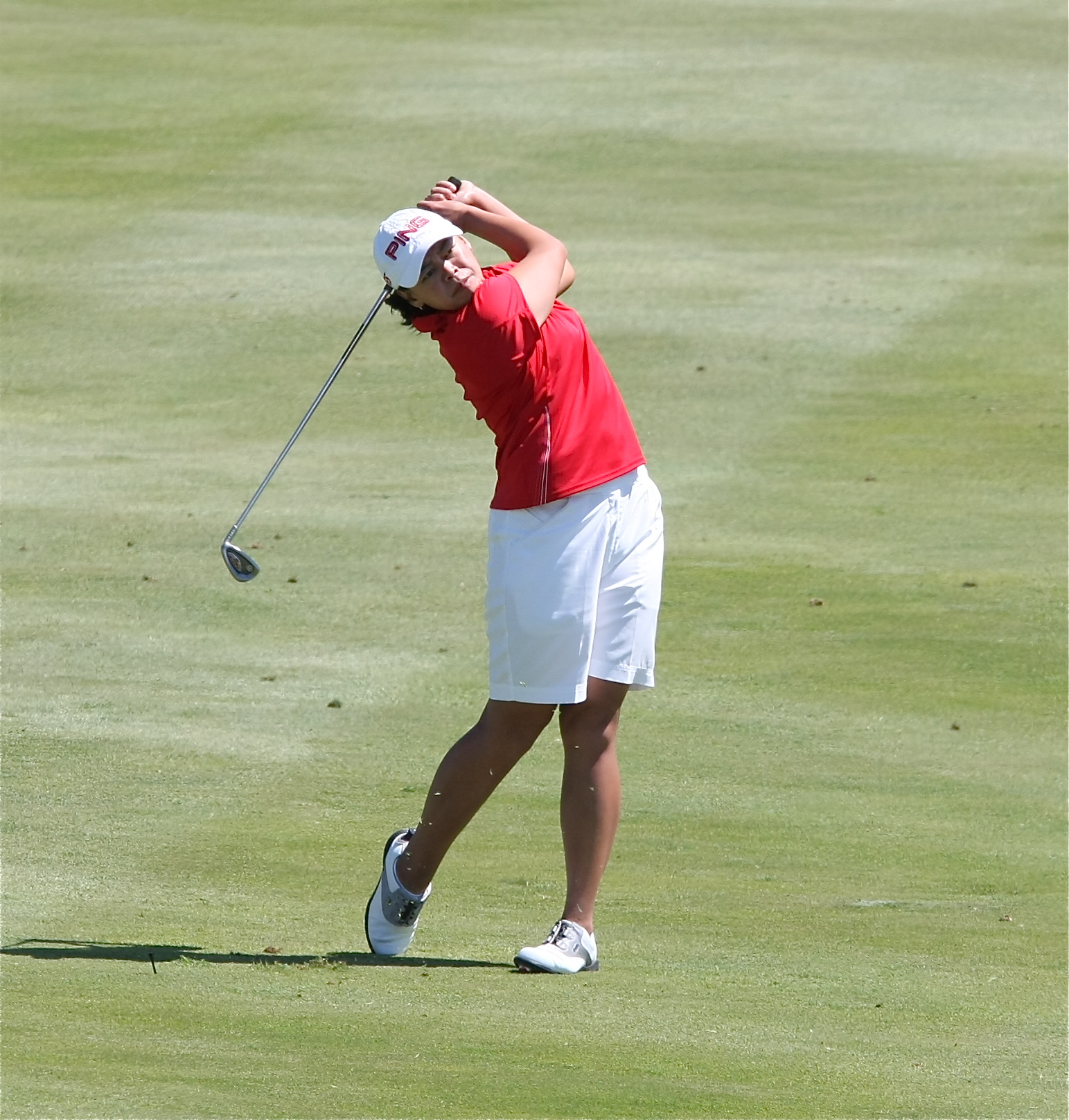
- Delasin at the 2008 LPGA Championship

Personal information
- Nationality: Philippines; United States
- Born: August 26, 1980 (age 46) Lubbock, Texas, U.S.
- Height: 5 ft 6 in (1.68 m)

Career
- Sport: Golf
- Turned professional: 1999
- Former tour: LPGA Tour (joined 2000)
- Professional wins: 5

Number of wins by tour
- LPGA Tour: 4
- Other: 1

Best results in LPGA major championships
- Chevron Championship: T9: 2005
- Women's PGA C'ship: T33: 2002
- U.S. Women's Open: T12: 2000
- du Maurier Classic: T23: 2000
- Women's British Open: T26: 2002

Achievements and awards
- LPGA Rookie of the Year: 2000
Medal record
Representing Philippines
Asian Games
Bronze medal – third place	1998 Bangkok	Women's team

Dorothy Delasin (born August 26, 1980) is a Filipino-American professional golfer who played on the LPGA Tour.

== Early life and amateur career ==
In 1980, Delasin was born in Lubbock, Texas. She grew up in San Francisco, California, where, as a student at Washington High, she won the boys' golf championship (the girls didn't have teams, so Delasin competed against the boys).

She had dual American and Filipino citizenship but gave it up sometime before 1999. Delasin won both the 1996 U.S. Girls' Junior and the 1999 U.S. Women's Amateur.

== Professional career ==
Delasin has four career LPGA titles including the 2001 Samsung World Championship.

On January 20, 2008, Delasin and Jennifer Rosales of Team Philippines won the 4th Women's World Cup of Golf in Sun City, South Africa, with birdies on the last four holes. The duo had a final round of 7-under-par 65 in the best ball, for a 54-hole aggregate of 18-under-par 198. South Korea's Ji-Yai Shin and Eun Hee Ji were second on 200 after a final round 67.

== Amateur wins ==
- 1996 California Women's Amateur Championship, U.S. Girls' Junior
- 1997 Southeast Asia Games (team and individual)
- 1998 Junior World Golf Championships (Girls 15-17)
- 1999 U.S. Women's Amateur

== Professional wins (5) ==
=== LPGA Tour wins (4) ===
No.	Date	Tournament	Winning score	Margin of victory	Runner(s)-up
1	Jul 30, 2000	Giant Eagle LPGA Classic	−11 (71-67-67=205)	Playoff	(United States) Pat Hurst
2	Jul 29, 2001	Giant Eagle LPGA Classic	−13 (69-69-65=203)	1 stroke	(United States) Tammie Green
3	Oct 7, 2001	Samsung World Championship	−11 (70-71-67-69=277)	4 strokes	(South Korea) Se Ri Pak (Australia) Karrie Webb
4	Nov 16, 2003	Mobile LPGA Tournament of Champions	−8 (72-71-68-69=280)	Playoff	(South Korea) Hee-Won Han

LPGA Tour playoff record (2–0)

No.	Year	Tournament	Opponent	Result
1	2000	Giant Eagle LPGA Classic	(United States) Pat Hurst	Won with par on second extra hole
2	2003	Mobile LPGA Tournament of Champions	(South Korea) Hee-Won Han	Won with birdie on first extra hole

=== Other wins (1) ===
- 2008 Women's World Cup of Golf (with Jennifer Rosales)

== Team appearances ==
Amateur

- Espirito Santo Trophy (representing the Philippines): 1996, 1998

Professional

- World Cup (representing the Philippines): 2005, 2006, 2008 (winners)
