= Golf at the 2026 Asian Games =

- Venue: Kasugai Country Club
- Location: Kasugai, Aichi, Japan
- Dates: 30 September – 3 October 2026
- Competitors: 111 from 25 nations

The golf tournaments at the 2026 Asian Games was held between 30 September and 3 October 2026 at the Kasugai Country Club.

== Schedule ==
The schedule is as follows:

R1	Round 1	R2	Round 2	R3	Round 3	FR	Final round

Event↓/Date →	30th Wed	1st Thu	2nd Fri	3rd Sat
Men's individual	R1	R2	R3	FR
Women's individual	R1	R2	R3	FR
Men's team	R1	R2	R3	FR
Women's team	R1	R2	R3	FR

== Medal summary ==
=== Medal table ===
* Host nation (Japan)

Rank	Nation	Gold	Silver	Bronze	Total
1	China	2	1	0	3
2	India	1	1	0	2
2	South Korea	1	1	0	2
4	Japan*	0	1	1	2
5	Chinese Taipei	0	0	1	1
5	Singapore	0	0	1	1
5	Thailand	0	0	1	1
Totals (7 entries)		4	4	4	12

=== Medalists ===
Event	Gold	Silver	Bronze
Men's individual	Kim Joo-hyung; South Korea	Kazuki Higa; Japan	Sadom Kaewkanjana; Thailand
Men's team	China; Ding Wenyi; Jin Zihao; Zheng Yunhe	South Korea; Kim Joo-hyung; Mun Do-yeob; Kim Seong-hyeon	Japan; Kazuki Higa; Taishi Moto; Keita Nakajima
Women's individual	Pranavi Urs; India	Yin Ruoning; China	Shannon Tan; Singapore
Women's team	China; Liu Yan; Yin Ruoning; Zhang Weiwei	India; Aditi Ashok; Diksha Dagar; Pranavi Urs	Chinese Taipei; Pei-Yun Chien; Hsu Wei-ling; Yani Tseng

== Participating nations ==
- Bangladesh (3)
- China (6)
- Chinese Taipei (6)
- Hong Kong (6)
- India (6)
- Indonesia (6)
- Iran (2)
- Japan (6)
- Kazakhstan (4)
- Kuwait (1)
- Kyrgyzstan (1)
- Macau (4)
- Mongolia (6)
- Nepal (4)
- Oman (1)
- Palestine (4)
- Philippines (6)
- Qatar (4)
- Singapore (6)
- South Korea (6)
- Sri Lanka (3)
- Thailand (6)
- United Arab Emirates (6)
- Uzbekistan (3)
- Vietnam (5)
