= 2005 Women's British Open =

Coordinates: 53.622°N 3.033°W

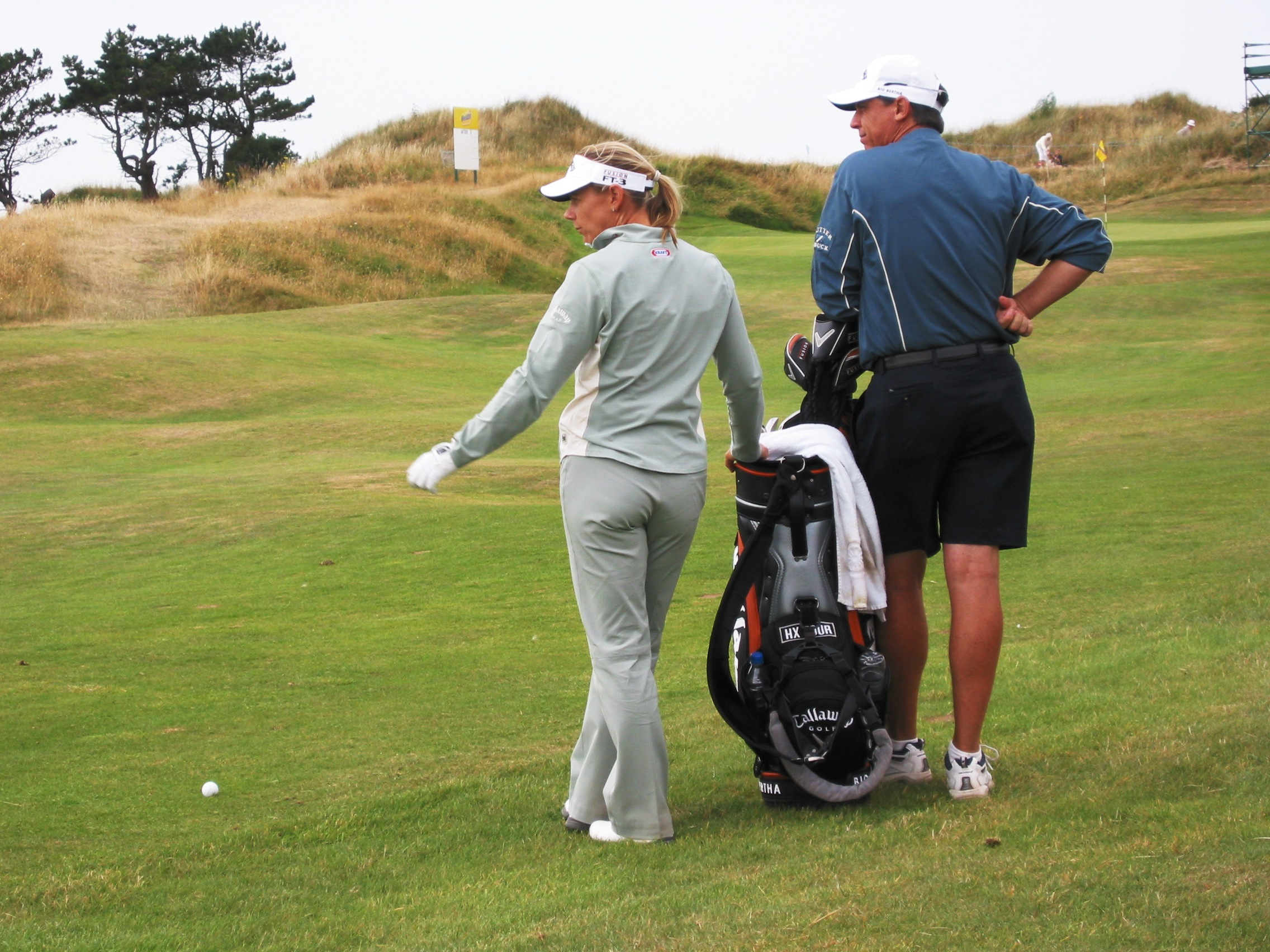
- Annika Sörenstam with caddie Terry McNamara on the 10th hole during the Pro-Am

Tournament information
- Dates: 28–31 July 2005
- Location: Southport, England
- Course: Royal Birkdale Golf Club
- Organized by: Ladies' Golf Union
- Tours: LPGA Tour; Ladies European Tour

Statistics
- Par: 72
- Length: 6,463 yards (5,910 m)
- Field: 150 players, 70 after cut
- Cut: 149 (+5)
- Prize fund: $1,800,000 €1,499,571
- Winner's share: $280,208 €233,440

Champion
- (South Korea) Jeong Jang
- 272 (−16)
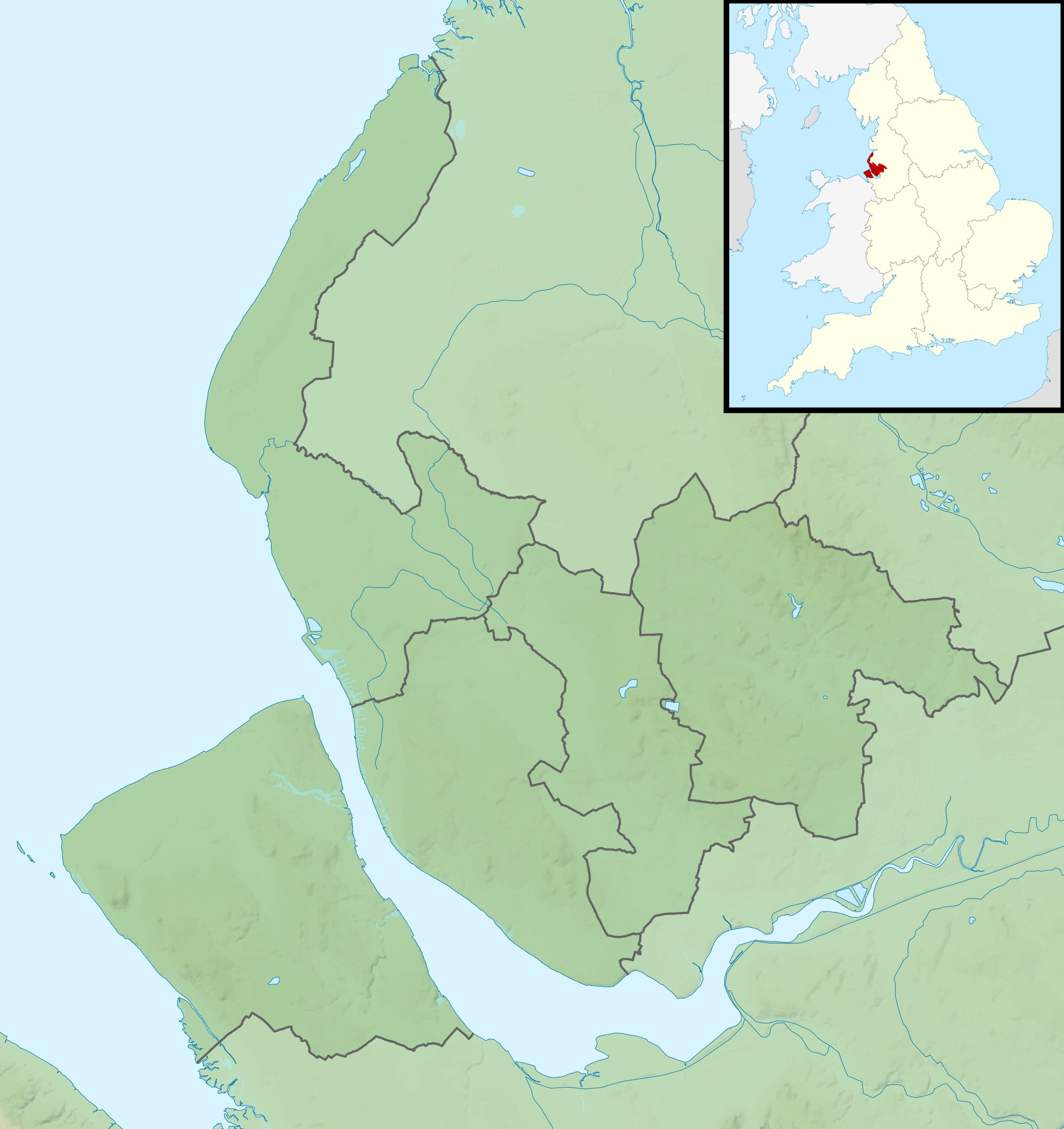
- Location in England Location in Merseyside, north of Liverpool Location in Southport

The 2005 Women's British Open was held 28–31 July at Royal Birkdale Golf Club in Southport, England. It was the 29th edition of the Women's British Open, and the fifth as a major championship on the LPGA Tour.

Jeong Jang led wire-to-wire, winning her first LPGA event and only major title, four strokes ahead of runner-up Sophie Gustafson. Michelle Wie, age 15, tied for third and was the low amateur in her final major before turning professional in the fall.

== Course layout ==
Hole	1	2	3	4	5	6	7	8	9	Out	10	11	12	13	14	15	16	17	18	In	Total
Yards	418	410	404	175	338	478	155	410	395	3,183	368	358	149	427	163	499	347	497	472	3,280	6,463
Par	4	4	4	3	4	5	3	4	4	35	4	4	3	4	3	5	4	5	5	37	72

== Round summaries ==
=== First round ===
Thursday, 28 July 2005

Place	Player	Score	To par
1	(South Korea) Jeong Jang	68	−4
2	(Sweden) Sophie Gustafson	69	−3
3	(Chile) Nicole Perrot	70	−2
T4	(United States) Moira Dunn	71	−1
T4	(United States) Emilee Klein	71	−1
T4	(Sweden) Liselotte Neumann	71	−1
T4	(Italy) Sophie Sandolo	71	−1
T4	(United States) Kim Williams	71	−1
T9	(Japan) Ai Miyazato	72	E
T9	(Sweden) Linda Wessberg	72	E

=== Second round ===
Friday, 29 July 2005

Place	Player	Score	To par
1	(South Korea) Jeong Jang	68-66=134	−10
2	(Sweden) Louise Stahle (a)	73-65=138	−6
3	(United States) Cristie Kerr	73-66=139	−5
4	(United States) Pat Hurst	75-65=140	−4
T5	(United States) Moira Dunn	71-70=141	−3
T5	(Sweden) Liselotte Neumann	71-70=141	−3
T5	(Australia) Karrie Webb	75-66=141	−3
T8	(Sweden) Sophie Gustafson	69-73=142	−2
T8	(United States) Juli Inkster	74-68=142	−2
T8	(South Korea) Young Kim	74-68=142	−2
T8	(Chile) Nicole Perrot	70-72=142	−2
T8	(Sweden) Annika Sörenstam	73-69=142	−2
T8	(United States) Michelle Wie (a)	73-69=142	−2

Amateurs: Stahle (−6), Wie (−2), Ciganda (+1), Queen (+16).

=== Third round ===
Saturday, 30 July 2005

Place	Player	Score	To par
1	(South Korea) Jeong Jang	68-66-69=203	−13
T2	(United States) Cristie Kerr	73-66-69=208	−8
T2	(Sweden) Annika Sörenstam	73-69-66=208	−8
T4	(United States) Paula Creamer	75-69-65=209	−7
T4	(Sweden) Sophie Gustafson	69-73-67=209	−7
T4	(South Korea) Young Kim	74-68-67=209	−7
T4	(Sweden) Liselotte Neumann	71-70-68=209	−7
T4	(United States) Michelle Wie (a)	75-67-67=209	−7
T10	(United States) Pat Hurst	75-65-70=210	−6
T10	(United States) Juli Inkster	74-68-68=210	−6
T10	(Sweden) Carin Koch	76-68-66=210	−6
T10	(England) Karen Stupples	74-72-65=210	−6
T10	(Australia) Karrie Webb	75-66-69=210	−6

=== Final round ===
Sunday, 31 July 2005

Place	Player	Score	To par	Money ($)
1	(South Korea) Jeong Jang	68-66-69-69=272	−16	280,028
2	(Sweden) Sophie Gustafson	69-73-67-67=276	−12	175,130
T3	(South Korea) Young Kim	74-68-67-69=278	−10	122,591
T3	(United States) Michelle Wie (a)	75-67-67-69=278	−10	0
T5	(United States) Cristie Kerr	73-66-69-71=279	−9	81,144
T5	(Sweden) Liselotte Neumann	71-70-68-70=279	−9	81,144
T5	(Sweden) Annika Sörenstam	73-69-66-71=279	−9	81,144
T8	(United States) Natalie Gulbis	76-70-68-66=280	−8	58,669
T8	(South Korea) Grace Park	77-68-67-68=280	−8	58,669
T8	(Sweden) Louise Stahle (a)	73-65-73-69=280	−8	0

(a) denotes amateur

Amateurs: Wie (−10), Stahle (−8), Ciganda (+2)
