= Golf at the 2014 Asian Games – Women's individual =

Golf

Women's individual at the 2014 Asian Games
- Venue: Dream Park Country Club
- Date: 25 September 2014 – 28 September 2014
- Competitors: 33 from 13 nations

Medalists
gold medal	Park Gyeol	South Korea
silver medal	Budsabakorn Sukapan	Thailand
bronze medal	Supamas Sangchan	Thailand

The women's individual competition at the 2014 Asian Games in Incheon, South Korea was held from 25 September to 28 September at the Dream Park Country Club.

== Schedule ==
All times are Korea Standard Time (UTC+09:00)

Date	Time	Event
Thursday, 25 September 2014	07:20	Round 1
Friday, 26 September 2014	07:20	Round 2
Saturday, 27 September 2014	07:20	Round 3
Sunday, 28 September 2014	06:50	Round 4

== Results ==
Rank	Athlete	Round				Total	To par
Rank	Athlete	1	2	3	4	Total	To par
1st place, gold medalist(s)	Park Gyeol (KOR)	71	67	67	64	269	−19
2nd place, silver medalist(s)	Budsabakorn Sukapan (THA)	68	67	68	67	270	−18
3rd place, bronze medalist(s)	Supamas Sangchan (THA)	67	72	67	68	274	−14
4	Shi Yuting (CHN)	74	70	70	65	279	−9
T5	Choi Hye-jin (KOR)	70	72	70	68	280	−8
T5	Lee So-young (KOR)	68	71	71	70	280	−8
T5	Minami Katsu (JPN)	69	69	72	70	280	−8
T8	Benyapa Niphatsophon (THA)	73	69	75	65	282	−6
T8	Tiffany Chan (HKG)	74	67	68	73	282	−6
10	Ye Ziqi (CHN)	70	71	74	68	283	−5
11	Princess Superal (PHI)	69	73	72	70	284	−4
12	Cheng Ssu-chia (TPE)	71	74	70	71	286	−2
13	Mia Legaspi (PHI)	70	72	71	74	287	−1
14	Yumi Matsubara (JPN)	73	75	72	70	290	+2
15	Gurbani Singh (IND)	75	72	70	74	291	+3
16	Wang Xinying (CHN)	71	73	75	73	292	+4
T17	Chen Chi-hui (TPE)	75	76	71	73	295	+7
T17	Eri Okayama (JPN)	73	76	67	79	295	+7
19	Kitty Tam (HKG)	69	82	72	73	296	+8
20	Hung Jo-hua (TPE)	73	78	72	75	298	+10
21	Aditi Ashok (IND)	78	75	71	75	299	+11
22	Pauline del Rosario (PHI)	78	73	75	75	301	+13
23	Demi Mak (MAC)	78	77	75	79	309	+21
24	Astha Madan (IND)	75	79	78	78	310	+22
25	Nguyễn Thảo My (VIE)	78	77	84	80	319	+31
26	Damdinsürengiin Bayarmaa (MGL)	91	87	90	87	355	+67
27	Altansükhiin Enerel (MGL)	92	100	86	81	359	+71
28	Ginger Mak (MAC)	100	92	94	98	384	+96
29	Byambajavyn Batnaran (MGL)	103	102	97	92	394	+106
30	Jumagul Polozhentseva (KAZ)	94	105	98	101	398	+110
31	Noor Al-Dousari (KUW)	96	105	98	107	406	+118
32	Inna Khegay (KAZ)	106	111	106	112	435	+147
33	Anna Streltsova (KAZ)	110	113	113	107	443	+155
