= Budsabakorn Sukapan =

Thai professional golfer

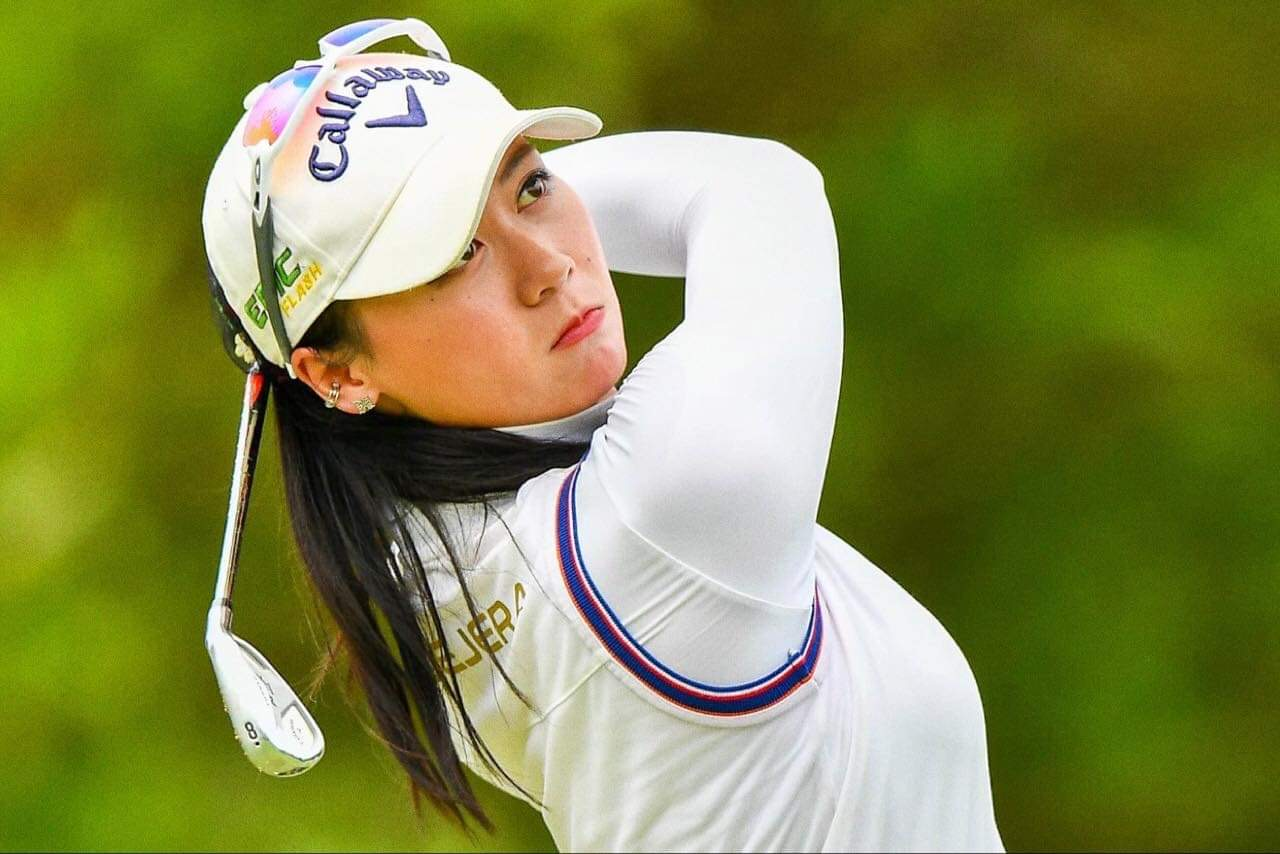

Personal information
- Nickname: Nook
- Nationality: Thailand
- Born: 11 September 1997 (age 29) Chiang Rai, Thailand
- Height: 172 cm (5 ft 8 in)

Career
- Sport: Golf
- Turned professional: 2014
- Current tour: LPGA of Japan Tour (joined 2020)
- Former tour: LPGA Tour (2016)
- Professional wins: 12
Medal record
Asian Games
Gold medal – first place	2014 Incheon	Women's team
Silver medal – second place	2014 Incheon	Women's individual

Budsabakorn "Nook" Sukapan (Thai: บุษบากร สุขพันธ์; born: 11 September 1997) is a Thai professional golfer playing on the LPGA of Japan Tour. As an amateur, she was a dual medalist in the 2014 Asian Games, winning a silver in the women's individual event, and the first ever gold medal for Thailand in the women's team event with Benyapa Niphatsophon and Supamas Sangchan.

== Early life ==
Sukapan was born on 11 September 1997 in Chiang Rai, Thailand. Sukapan started playing golf at the age of 9 years old. Her hobbies include watching movies and listening to music.

== Amateur career ==
Sukapan secured a gold medal at the 2014 Asian Games in the women's team event with Benyapa Niphatsophon and Supamas Sangchan which was the first gold medal to be earned by Thailand in women's golf event at the Asian Games. She also went on to win a silver in the women's individual event.

== Professional career ==
Sukapan turned professional in 2014. She captured her first career China LPGA Tour win at the 2015 Srixon XXIO Ladies Open.

In December 2015, Sukapan finished tied for 2nd at the final stage LPGA Qualifying Tournament to earn LPGA Membership for the 2016 season. In the 2016 LPGA Tour, she played 19 events and made five cuts.

In 2019, Sukapan played in the JLPGA Step Up Tour and won 4 titles. She finished first in money ranking and earned a tour card for the 2020 LPGA of Japan Tour.

== Amateur wins ==
- 2013 Singha Thailand Amateur Open, Road to Panasonic Open Singha Championship, Malaysian Junior Open
- 2014 Singapore Junior Championship, Dutch International Junior Open

== Professional wins (12) ==
=== China LPGA Tour wins (3) ===
- 2015 (2) Srixon XXIO Ladies Open, CTBC Ladies Open^{1}
- 2026 (1) Straits Cup Ladies Classic^{1}

^{1} Co-sanctioned by the Taiwan LPGA Tour.

=== Taiwan LPGA Tour wins (2) ===
- 2015 (1) CTBC Ladies Open^{1}
- 2026 (1) Straits Cup Ladies Classic^{1}

^{1} Co-sanctioned by the China LPGA Tour.

=== JLPGA Step Up Tour wins (4) ===
- 2019 (4) Udon-Ken Ladies, Shizu Hills Ladies Mori Building Cup, KCFG Ladies Golf Tournament, Hanasaka Ladies Yanmar Golf Tournament

=== Thai LPGA Tour wins (5) ===
- 2014 (1) 2nd Singha-SAT Thai LPGA Championship
- 2017 (1) 7th Singha-SAT-Toyota Thai LPGA Championship
- 2023 (1) Thai LPGA Classic
- 2024 (1) Singha-SAT Thai LPGA Ladies Open
- 2026 (1) Singha-SAT Thai LPGA Masters

== Team appearances ==
Amateur

- Queen Sirikit Cup (representing Thailand): 2014
