= Amit Luthra =

Indian golfer

Personal information
- Full name: Amit Krishan Luthra
- Born: 15 September 1960 (age 66) New Delhi, India

Career
- Sport: Golf
Medal record
Men's golf
Representing India
Asian Games
Gold medal – first place	1982 Delhi	Team

Amit Krishan Luthra (born 15 September 1960) is an Indian golfer. He led his country's team for over 20 years.

== Career ==
Luthra was born in New Delhi, India. His father was an avid golfer who served in the Indian Air Force. Luthra started playing golf at a very young age in Kanpur with his father and siblings where there was access to golf courses.

Luthra represented India in the 1982 Asian Games, where he was on the gold medal team. He is also an Arjuna Awardee, and recently won the Golf Championship at Pehelgam.

Luthra founded and runs The Golf Foundation in India, which helps underprivileged children. He has also taught young golfers, including Ashok Kumar, Rashid Khan and Shubham Jaglan.
