= Lakshman Singh (golfer) =

Indian golfer

Personal information
- Nationality: India
- Born: c.1952

Career
- Sport: Golf
- Status: Professional
Medal record
Asian Games
Gold medal – first place	1982 Delhi	Individual
Gold medal – first place	1982 Delhi	Team

Lakshman Singh (born c.1952) is an Indian golfer who won the individual gold medal for India at 1982 Asian Games. He was awarded Arjuna Award in 1982. He hails from Rajasthan state. His sons, Arjun Singh and Ranjit Singh have also represented India in golf. He is popularly known as Bunny Lakshman Singh.
