= Hidemasa Hoshino =

Japanese golfer (born 1977)

Hidemasa Hoshino 星野 英正
Personal information
- Nationality: Japan
- Born: 19 September 1977 (age 49) Sendai, Japan
- Height: 1.80 m (5 ft 11 in)
- Weight: 73 kg (161 lb; 11.5 st)

Career
- Sport: Golf
- Status: Professional
- Current tour: Japan Golf Tour
- Professional wins: 3
- Highest ranking: 95 (24 December 2006)

Number of wins by tour
- Japan Golf Tour: 3

Best results in major championships
- Masters Tournament: DNP
- PGA Championship: DNP
- U.S. Open: DNP
- The Open Championship: CUT: 2004
Medal record
Asian Games
Gold medal – first place	1998 Bangkok	Men's team
Bronze medal – third place	1998 Bangkok	Individual

Hidemasa Hoshino (星野 英正, Hoshino Hidemasa; born 19 September 1977) is a Japanese golfer.

== Career ==
Hoshino was born in Sendai, Miyagi Prefecture. He has won three times on the Japan Golf Tour. He has featured in the top 100 of the Official World Golf Ranking.

== Professional wins (3) ==
=== Japan Golf Tour wins (3) ===
Legend
Japan majors (1)
Other Japan Golf Tour (2)

No.	Date	Tournament	Winning score	Margin of victory	Runner(s)-up
1	4 May 2003	The Crowns	−10 (69-64-70-67=270)	3 strokes	(Japan) Toshimitsu Izawa, (Myanmar) Zaw Moe, (Japan) Taichi Teshima
2	1 Oct 2006	Coca-Cola Tokai Classic	−2 (70-73-72-67=282)	2 strokes	(Japan) Katsumasa Miyamoto
3	6 Jul 2008	UBS Japan Golf Tour Championship ShishidoHills	−12 (70-66-66-70=272)	5 strokes	(Australia) Brendan Jones, (Japan) Takao Nogami

Japan Golf Tour playoff record (0–1)

No.	Year	Tournament	Opponents	Result
1	2013	Coca-Cola Tokai Classic	(Japan) Shingo Katayama, (Japan) Satoshi Tomiyama	Katayama won with birdie on first extra hole

== Results in major championships ==
Tournament	2004
The Open Championship	CUT

CUT = missed the half-way cut
Note: Hoshino only played in The Open Championship.

== Results in World Golf Championships ==
Tournament	2008
Match Play	
Championship	
Invitational	T48

Did not play

"T" = Tied

== Team appearances ==
Amateur

- Eisenhower Trophy (representing Japan): 1996, 1998
- Bonallack Trophy (representing Asia/Pacific): 1998
