= Kanyalak Preedasuttijit =

Thai professional golfer (born 1998)

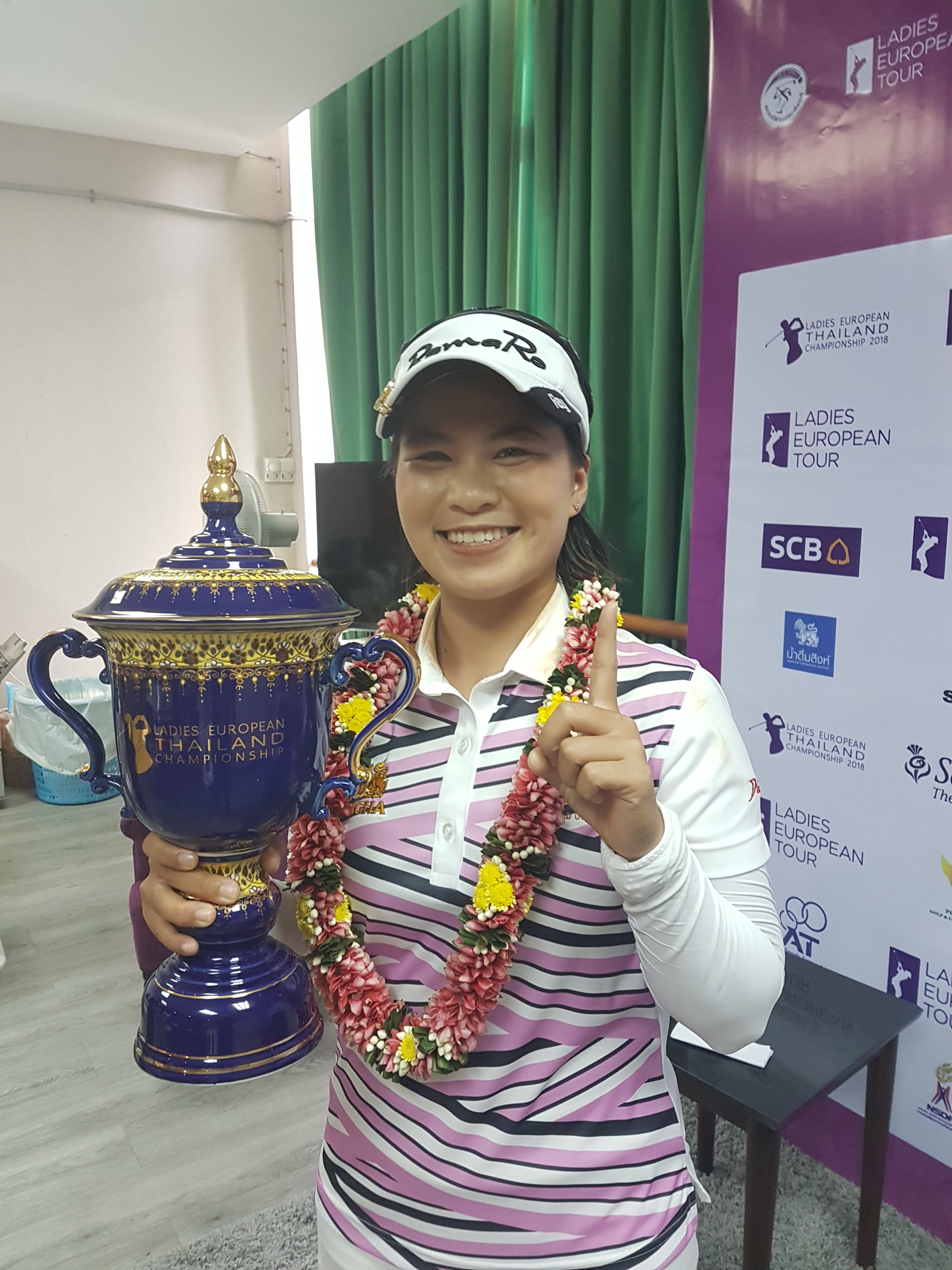

Personal information
- Nickname: Bew
- Nationality: Thailand
- Born: 23 February 1998 (age 28) Chonburi, Thailand
- Height: 1.55 m (5 ft 1 in)

Career
- Sport: Golf
- Turned professional: 2017
- Current tours: China LPGA Tour; Ladies European Tour
- Professional wins: 3

Number of wins by tour
- Ladies European Tour: 1
- Other: 2

Best results in LPGA major championships
- Chevron Championship: DNP
- Women's PGA C'ship: DNP
- U.S. Women's Open: DNP
- Women's British Open: CUT: 2018
- Evian Championship: CUT: 2018

Kanyalak Preedasuttijit (Thai: กันยลักษณ์ ปรีดาสุทธิจิตต์; born 23 February 1998) is a Thai professional golfer who won the Ladies European Thailand Championship on 24 June 2018. The victory enabled the 20-year-old to take advantage of the two-year exemption membership on the Ladies European Tour.

== Early life ==
Kanyalak was born on the 23 February 1998 in Chonburi to Anan Preedasuttijit and Nitikan Krissadapon. She has a brother Natkawin who is three years her junior. She started playing golf at a young age and she is known by her nickname "Bew".

== Junior career ==
In 2012 Kanyalak won the Jakarta World Golf Championship. for All Girls classes, as well as being part of Thailand's side that won the team event. In 2013 the team repeated their success at the same tournament with Kanyalak finishing as runner-up in the individual competition.

== Amateur career ==
Kanyalak won both the 2014 and 2016 Thailand Amateur Open. She won the 2015 Singha Classic on the All Thailand Golf Tour.

== Professional career ==
=== 2017 ===
Kanyalak turned professional in 2017 at the age of 18 and played on the China LPGA Tour. In that year, Kanyalak finished third to fellow Thai Saranporn Langkulgasettrin at the Orient Masters Wuhan Challenge and then finished runner-up to China's Liu Wenbo at the Sun Car Zhangjiagang Shuangshan Classic. She finished the season in 7th position on the CLPGA Order of Merit. On 27 May, Kanyalak won her first title as a professional as she lifted the trophy at the 2nd Singha Sat Toyota Thai LPGA event at the Rancho Charnvee Resort and Country Club.

=== 2018 ===
The following year at the Orient Masters Wuhan Challenge she finished as runner-up to Huang Chin from Taiwan. At the end of 2018 she had finished 5th on the CLPGA Order of Merit. She then emerged onto the international golf scene with her victory at 2018 Ladies European Thailand Championship at Phoenix Golf and Country Club in Pattaya. This victory gave her a two-year membership on the Ladies European Tour, plus entries into both the 2018 Ricoh Women's British Open and the Evian Championship.

=== 2019 ===
Kanyalak competed on both the China LPGA Tour and the Ladies European Tour. During the season she finished 13th at both the Omega Dubai Moonlight Classic and the European Thailand Ladies Golf Championship. At the end of the season, she was ranked as the number 1 putter on the Ladies European Tour.

== Professional wins (3) ==
=== Ladies European Tour wins (1) ===
| No. | Date | Tournament | Winning score | Margin of victory | Runner-up |
|---|---|---|---|---|---|
| 1 | 24 Jun 2018 | Ladies European Thailand Championship | −15 (70-68-66-69=273) | 1 stroke | (South Korea) Selin Hyun (a) |

=== All Thailand Golf Tour wins (1) ===
- 2015 Singha Classic (as an amateur)

=== Thai LPGA Tour wins (1) ===
- 2017 2nd Singha-SAT-Toyota Thai LPGA Championship

== Results in LPGA majors ==
Results not in chronological order.

| Tournament | 2018 |
|---|---|
| The Chevron Championship | |
| U.S. Women's Open | |
| Women's PGA Championship | |
| The Evian Championship | CUT |
| Women's British Open | CUT |

Did not play

CUT = missed the half-way cut

== Team appearances ==
- Espirito Santo Trophy (representing Thailand): 2016
