= Louise Stahle =

Swedish professional golfer (born 1985)

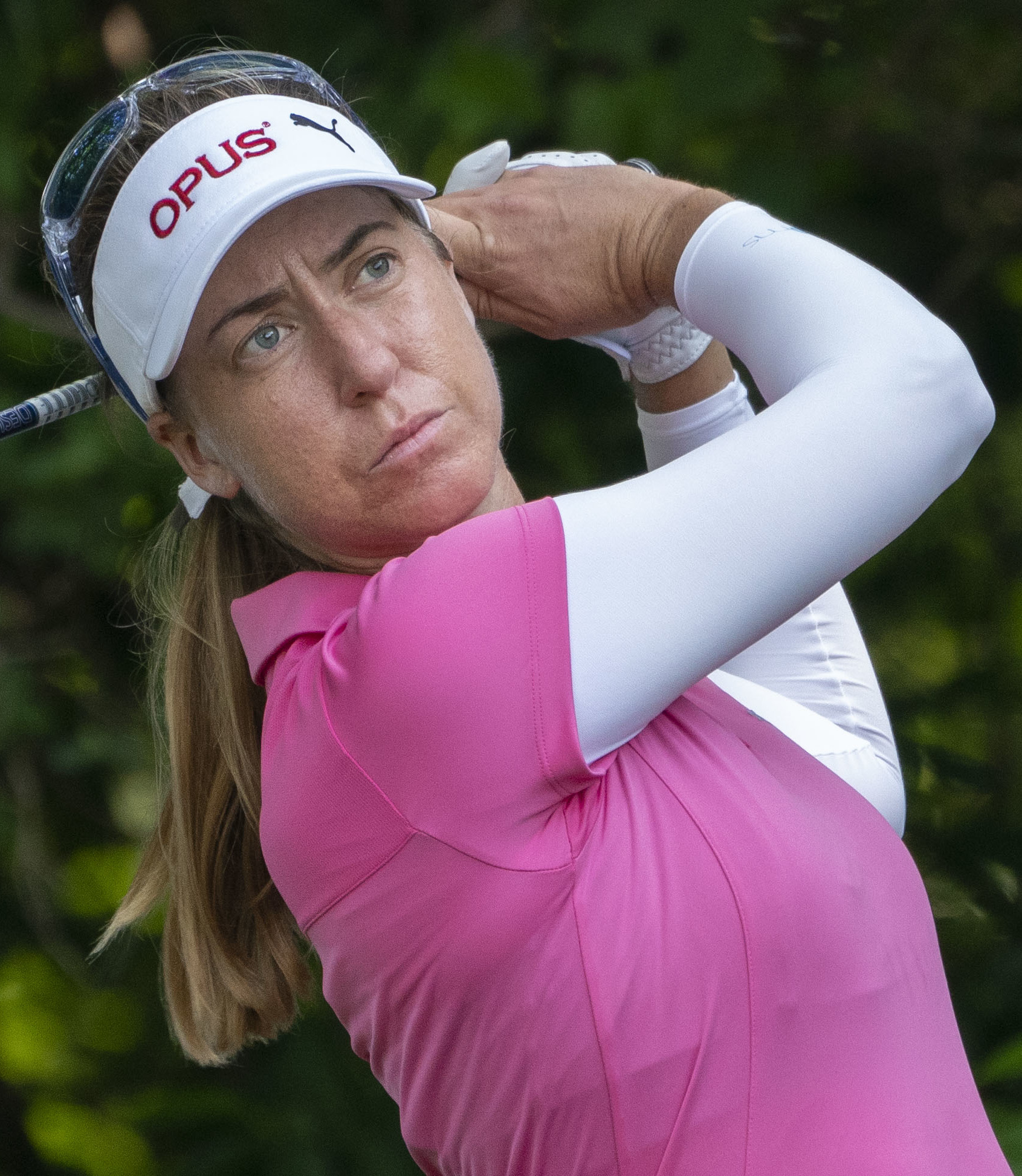
- Stahle in 2019

Personal information
- Nationality: Sweden
- Born: 19 March 1985 (age 41) Lund, Sweden
- Height: 1.75 m (5 ft 9 in)

Career
- Sport: Golf
- College: Arizona State University
- Turned professional: 2005
- Current tours: LPGA Tour (joined 2006); Ladies European Tour (joined 2007)
- Professional wins: 2

Best results in LPGA major championships
- Chevron Championship: DNP
- Women's PGA C'ship: T67: 2010
- U.S. Women's Open: T48: 2010
- Women's British Open: T8: 2005

Achievements and awards
- Ladies European Tour Rookie of the Year: 2007
- NGCA Player of the Year: 2005
- NGCA Freshman of the Year: 2005

Louise Stahle (born 19 March 1985) is a professional golf player who has played on both the U.S.-based LPGA Tour and the Ladies European Tour. She won the British Ladies Amateur back-to-back in 2004 and 2005

== Early life ==
Stahle was born in Lund, Sweden, into a family with a strong golfing background. She started playing golf at the age of nine and practiced golf and other sports during summer vacations. Tennis has been her second sport.

Her father, Oscar Stahle and her uncle, Fredrik Stahle were both among the best amateur players in Sweden in the 1970s. Fredrik won the 1977 Swedish Junior Stroke-Play Championship and represented Sweden twice in the European Youths' Team Championship.

In 2002, at 17 years of age, she won the French International Lady Juniors Amateur Championship as well as the Swedish Junior Match-play Championship and was a member of the European Junior Solheim Cup team. In 2003, she was again a member of the European Junior Solheim Cup team, this time on the winning side and in her native Sweden.

== Amateur career ==
Stahle had a very successful amateur career. In 2004, she won the St Rule Trophy at St Andrews, Scotland, the Beirut Café Ladies Trophy on the Swedish Golf Tour (at the time named the Telia Tour) and won the Smyth Salver as leading amateur at the Weetabix Women's British Open. However, her greatest achievement of the year came when she became the first Swede to win the British Ladies Amateur, when she won at Gullane No 1 in Scotland. She was part of the winning Swedish Team at the 2004 Espirito Santo Trophy together with Sofie Andersson and Karin Sjödin.

Stahle played collegiate golf 2004-2005 at Arizona State University, where she had one of the finest freshman seasons in school history. She had four runner-up performances and three victories in 10 tournaments, including wins at the Wildcat Invitational and PING/ASU Invitational. She was named National Golf Coaches Association Eleanor Dudley Division I Player of the Year and Freshman of the Year as well as being named to All-American First team and Scholar team. She was Pac-10 Golfer of the Year and Freshman of the Year, won the Pac-10 championship and was named All-Pac-10 first team. She also won the Golfstat Cup, which is given to the player who has the best scoring average versus par with at least 20 full rounds played during a season.

Stahle became the first player in 30 years to successfully defend the Ladies' British Amateur title, when she won again in 2005, this time at Littlestone, Scotland.

Playing as an amateur at the 2005 Weetabix Women's British Open, she was placed lone second after two rounds. She did not have the possibility to win any prize money, but her invitation to the major championship, as reigning British Amateur champion, was conditioned to the fact that she played as an amateur. After finishing tied eighth in the tournament, two strokes from second place, Stahle turned professional.

== Professional career ==
Stahle made her professional debut at the 2005 Scandinavian TPC hosted by Annika at her home club, Barsebäck Golf & Country Club in Sweden, finishing 15th. She gained exempt status for the 2006 LPGA Tour season by finishing tied for 11th at the LPGA Final Qualifying Tournament.

From 2006 to 2011, she played in 56 LPGA Tour tournaments with an 8th-place finish at the 2009 Sybase Classic as her best result. In 2006, Louise secured her playing rights at the Ladies European Tour (LET) and played 49 tournaments between 2007 and 2012. Runner-up finishes at the 2007 Ladies Open of Portugal and the 2008 Ladies German Open were her best results. In 2015, Stahle re-entered both the LPGA Tour and Ladies European Tour after successfully completing both qualifying schools.

== Amateur wins ==
- 2002 Swedish Junior Matchplay Championship, French International Lady Juniors Amateur Championship
- 2004 St Rule Trophy, British Ladies Amateur
- 2005 British Ladies Amateur

== Professional wins (2) ==
=== Swedish Golf Tour wins (2) ===
No.	Date	Tournament	Winning score	To par	Margin of victory	Runner-up	Ref
1	3 Jun 2004	Beirut Café Ladies Trophy (as an amateur)	69-68=137	–7	2 strokes	(Denmark) Lisa Holm Sørensen	
2	2 Jul 2005	Swedish Matchplay Championship (as an amateur)				(Sweden) Emelie Leijon	

== Results in LPGA majors ==
Results not in chronological order.

Tournament	2004	2005	2006	2007	2008	2009	2010	2011	2012
ANA Inspiration									
U.S. Women's Open							T48		
Women's PGA Championship			CUT				T67	CUT	
Women's British Open	T42LA	T8	CUT	CUT	CUT	T59			

Tournament	2013	2014	2015	2016	2017	2018	2019	2020	2021
ANA Inspiration									
U.S. Women's Open									CUT
Women's PGA Championship									
The Evian Championship ^									
Women's British Open									

^ The Evian Championship was added as a major in 2013

Top 10
Did not play

LA = Low amateur
CUT = missed the half-way cut
"T" = tied

== Team appearances ==
Amateur

- European Girls' Team Championship (representing Sweden): 2002, 2003
- Junior Solheim Cup (representing Europe): 2002, 2003 (winners)
- Espirito Santo Trophy (representing Sweden): 2004 (winners)
- European Ladies' Team Championship (representing Sweden): 2005
