= Thailand Amateur Open =

Annual amateur golf tournament in Thailand

Tournament information
- Location: Bangkok, Thailand
- Established: 1930
- Course: Panya Indra Golf Club
- Organized by: Thailand Golf Association
- Format: Stroke play (72 holes)
- Month played: September

Current champion
- (Vietnam) Nguyễn Tuấn Anh (men) (Japan) Anna Iwanaga (women)

The Thailand Amateur Open (Thai: ไทยแลนด์ อเมเจอร์ โอเพ่น), currently played as the Singha Thailand Amateur Open for sponsorship reasons, is an annual amateur golf championship held in Thailand. Organised by the Thailand Golf Association, the tournament includes separate men's and women's competitions.

The men's champion receives the King Rama VII Trophy, while the women's champion receives the TGA President's Trophy. The championship traces its origins to 1930, although its edition numbering does not correspond exactly to an uninterrupted annual sequence.

== History ==
The Thailand Amateur Open was established in 1930 and is one of Thailand's long-running national amateur golf championships. The men's competition is associated with the King Rama VII Trophy, donated by King Prajadhipok, while the women's competition is associated with the TGA President's Trophy.

Past champions and leading finishers have included golfers who later competed professionally, including Thongchai Jaidee, Prayad Marksaeng, Thaworn Wiratchant, Boonchu Ruangkit, Atthaya Thitikul, Aditi Ashok, Natthakritta Vongtaveelap and Chanettee Wannasaen.

Recent editions have generally been staged at Panya Indra Golf Club in Bangkok.

== Format ==
The modern championship is played as a 72-hole stroke play event over four rounds. The men's and women's competitions are held separately, with the lowest aggregate gross score determining the champion in each division. Under the 2025 conditions of competition, ties for first place are decided by a sudden-death, hole-by-hole playoff.

== Winners ==
The following tables list champions identified in the available published sources.

=== Men ===
Men's champions
Year	Edition	Champion	Score	Margin	Runner(s)-up	Ref.
2026	92nd	(Philippines) Miguel Ilas	202 (−8) (Note: Shortened to 54 holes due to weather.)	Playoff	(Thailand) Put Nugooludomphanit, (South Korea) Park Si-woo	
2025	91st	(Vietnam) Nguyễn Tuấn Anh	258 (−22)	5 strokes	(Thailand) Thanawin Lee, (Thailand) Teerawut Boonseeor	
2024	90th	(Thailand) Parin Sarasmut	262 (−18)	5 strokes	(Hong Kong) Jeffrey Shen	
2023	89th	(Thailand) Thanawin Lee	270 (−10)	Playoff	(Thailand) Warut Boonrod	
2022	88th	(Thailand) Ashita Piamkulvanich	276 (−4)	4 strokes	(Thailand) Supapon Amornchaichan, (Thailand) Arsit Areephun	
2021	87th	(Thailand) Pongsapak Laopakdee	273 (−11)	3 strokes	(Thailand) Natthaphong Ratchatorn	
2020	86th	(Thailand) Pongsapak Laopakdee	269 (−11)	3 strokes	(Thailand) Natthaphong Ratchatorn	
2019	85th	(Thailand) Wit Pitipat	271 (−9)	2 strokes	(Finland) Jesse Waaralinna, (Australia) Billy Cawthorne, (Thailand) Weerawish Narkprachar	
2018	84th	(Thailand) Nopparat Panichpon	271 (−9)	5 strokes	(Japan) Yuto Watanabe	
2017	83rd	(Thailand) Witchayanon Chothirunrungrueng	268 (−16)	1 stroke	(Singapore) Jesse Yap	
2016	82nd	(Thailand) Witchayanon Chothirunrungrueng	273 (−15)	2 strokes	(Thailand) Sadom Kaewkanjana	
2015	81st	(Australia) Blake Proverbs	278 (−10)	1 stroke	(South Korea) Son Jun-ho	
2014	80th	(Thailand) Sarit Suwannarut	276 (E)	3 strokes	(Myanmar) Ye Htet Aung	
2013	79th	(Thailand) Suradit Yongcharoenchai	281	Playoff	(Thailand) Poom Saksansin, (Singapore) Jerome Ng	
2012	78th	(Thailand) Itthipat Buranatanyarat	272	9 strokes	(Sri Lanka) Nadaraja Thangaraja	
2011	77th	(Thailand) Natipong Srithong	277 (−11)	1 stroke	(Myanmar) Maung Maung Oo	

=== Women ===
Women's champions
Year	Edition	Champion	Score	Margin	Runner(s)-up	Ref.
2026	92nd	(Thailand) Kwanchanok Boonchan	198 (−12)	4 strokes	(Thailand) Pinyaphat Kamolborvorn	
2025	91st	(Japan) Anna Iwanaga	262 (−18)	4 strokes	(Thailand) Namo Luangnitikul, (Thailand) Achiraya Sriwong	
2024	90th	(Thailand) Achiraya Sriwong	268 (−12)	1 stroke	(Thailand) Thitikarn Thapasit	
2023	89th	(Thailand) Thitikarn Thapasit	269 (−11)	1 stroke	(Thailand) Alisa Inprasit, (Thailand) Achiraya Sriwong	
2022	88th	(Thailand) Natthakritta Vongtaveelap	270 (−10)	Playoff	(Philippines) Rianne Malixi	
2021	87th	(Thailand) Natthakritta Vongtaveelap	270 (−14)	6 strokes	(Thailand) Suvichaya Vinijchaitham	
2020	86th	(Thailand) Thitapa Pakdeesettakul	274 (−6)	Playoff	(Thailand) Chanettee Wannasaen, (Thailand) Natthakritta Vongtaveelap	
2019	85th	(South Korea) Kang Hyeon-ji	276 (−4)	Playoff	(Japan) Shoka Furuya	
2018	84th	(Thailand) Taparat Boonyasaknanon	280 (E)	1 stroke	(Thailand) Phannarai Meesom-us	
2017	83rd	(Thailand) Kultida Pramphun	280 (−4)	1 stroke	(Thailand) Taglao Jeeravivitaporn	
2016	82nd	(Thailand) Kanyalak Preedasuttijit	283 (−5)	5 strokes	(Thailand) Atthaya Thitikul	
2015	81st	(India) Aditi Ashok	286 (−2)	5 strokes	(Australia) Gennai Goodwin, (Thailand) Chakansim Khamborn	
2014	80th	(Thailand) Kanyalak Preedasuttijit	280	2 strokes	(Thailand) Parinda Phokan	
2013	79th	(Thailand) Budsabakorn Sukapan	285	Playoff	(Philippines) Princess Mary Superal	
2012	78th	(Thailand) Benyapa Niphatsophon	282	3 strokes	(Philippines) Princess Mary Superal	
2011	77th	(Philippines) Dottie Ardina	284 (−4)	10 strokes	(Thailand) Asama McKenzie, (Philippines) Chihiro Ikeda	
