= Jang Jeong =

South Korean professional golfer (born 1980)

Jeong Jang 장정
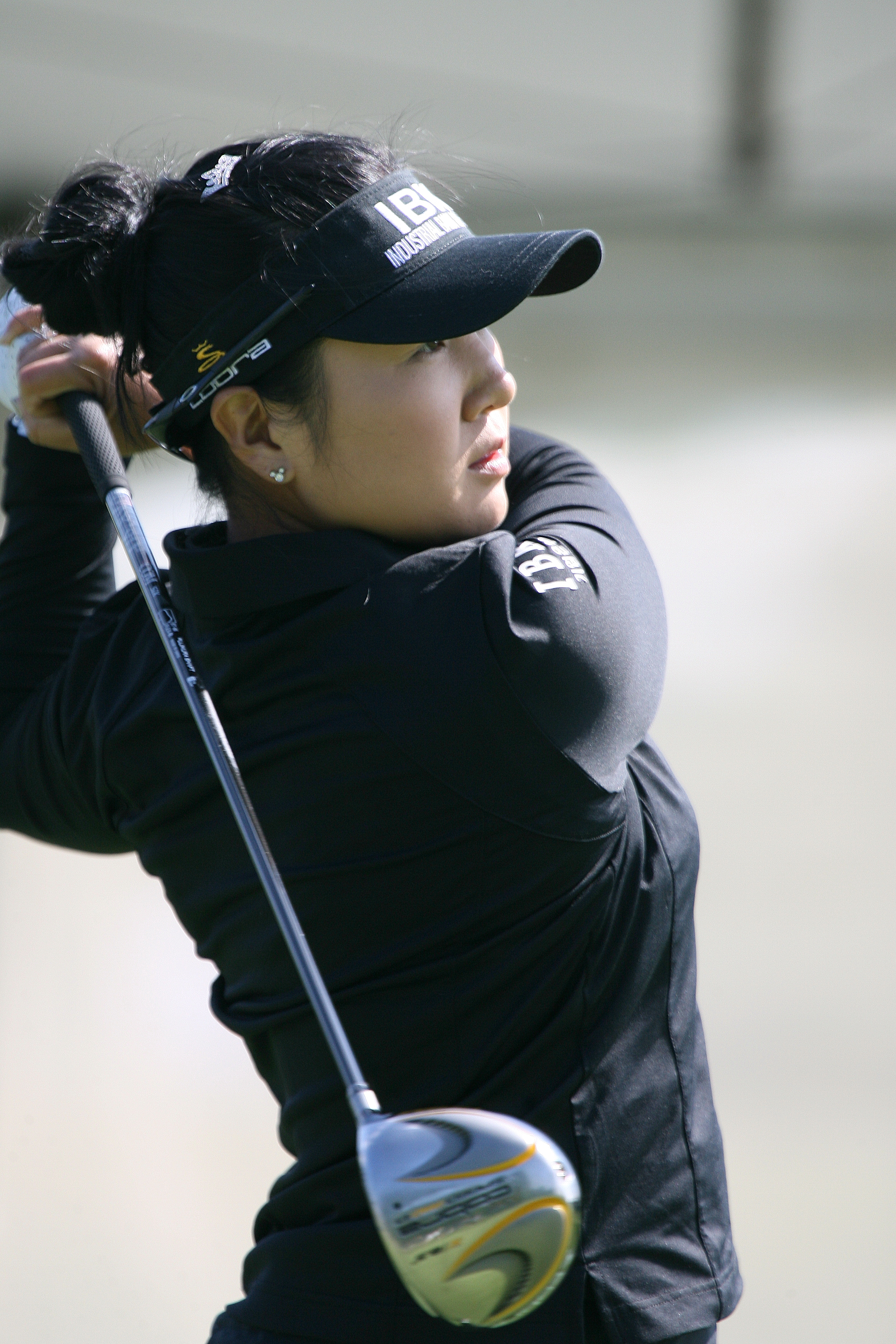
- Jang at the 2007 LPGA Championship

Personal information
- Nickname: JJ
- Nationality: South Korea
- Born: 11 June 1980 (age 46) Daejeon, South Korea
- Height: 5 ft 0 in (1.52 m)

Career
- Sport: Golf
- College: Joongbu University (2003)
- Turned professional: 2000
- Former tours: LPGA Tour (2000–2014); LPGA of Korea Tour
- Professional wins: 4

Number of wins by tour
- LPGA Tour: 2
- Ladies European Tour: 1
- LPGA of Japan Tour: 1
- LPGA of Korea Tour: 1

Best results in LPGA major championships (wins: 1)
- Chevron Championship: T18: 2001
- Women's PGA C'ship: T11: 2003
- U.S. Women's Open: T6: 2003
- du Maurier Classic: CUT: 2000
- Women's British Open: Won: 2005
- Evian Championship: WD: 2013
Medal record
Asian Games
Silver medal – second place	1998 Bangkok	Women's team
Bronze medal – third place	1998 Bangkok	Individual

- Korean name
- Hangul: 장정
- Hanja: 張晶
- RR: Jang Jeong
- MR: Chang Chŏng

Jeong Jang (Korean: 장정; born 11 June 1980) is a South Korean professional golfer who played on the U.S.-based LPGA Tour. She was also a member of the LPGA of Korea Tour.

Jang was born in Daejeon, South Korea. She started playing golf at the age of thirteen. As a teenager she won the 1997 Korea Women's Open and the 1998 Korea Women's Amateur. She attended Joongbu University. After qualifying for the LPGA Tour at her first attempt, Jang had a successful rookie season in 2000 including a second-place finish. She reached twelfth on the money list in 2004 and in that year had nine finishes in the top ten. In July 2005 she won for the first time, claiming the Women's British Open, which is one of the women's majors, by four shots. She claimed her second LPGA win in 2006 at the Wegmans LPGA.

== Professional wins (3) ==
=== LPGA Tour wins (2) ===
Legend
LPGA Tour major championships (1)
Other LPGA Tour (1)

No.	Date	Tournament	Winning score	To par	Margin of victory	Runner-up
1	31 Jul 2005	**Women's British Open**^{[1]}	68-66-69-69=272	−16	4 strokes	(Sweden) Sophie Gustafson
2	25 Jun 2006	Wegmans LPGA	69-70-66-70=275	−13	1 stroke	(Paraguay) Julieta Granada

^{1} Co-sanctioned by the Ladies European Tour.

LPGA Tour playoff record (0–3)

No.	Year	Tournament	Opponent	Result
1	2000	Safeway LPGA Golf Championship	(South Korea) Mi Hyun Kim	Lost to birdie on second extra hole
2	2007	Evian Masters	(United States) Natalie Gulbis	Lost to birdie on first extra hole
3	2008	LPGA Corning Classic	(United States) Leta Lindley	Lost to birdie on first extra hole

=== LPGA of Japan Tour wins (1) ===
No.	Date	Tournament	Winning score	To par	Margin of victory	Runner-up
1	1 Oct 2006	**Japan Women's Open**	69-69-72-69=279	−9	5 strokes	(South Korea) Shin Hyun-ju

Tournament in bold denotes major championships in JLPGA Tour.

=== LPGA of Korea Tour wins (1) ===
- 1997 Korea Women's Open

== Major championships ==
=== Wins (1) ===
Year	Championship	Winning score	Margin	Runner-up
2005	Women's British Open	−16 (68-66-69-69=272)	4 strokes	(Sweden) Sophie Gustafson

=== Results timeline ===
Results not in chronological order before 2014.

Tournament	1999	2000	2001	2002	2003	2004	2005	2006	2007	2008	2009
Kraft Nabisco Championship			T18	T45	T21	23	T27	T19	T54	T31	
LPGA Championship		CUT	CUT	T57	T11	T23	T13	T58	T25	T18	
U.S. Women's Open	CUT			T22	T6	T7	T50	T28	T8	T19	CUT
du Maurier Classic ^		CUT									
Women's British Open ^			CUT	T4	T14	T23	1	T26	CUT	WD	T25

Tournament	2010	2011	2012	2013	2014
Kraft Nabisco Championship	T48		CUT	WD	
U.S. Women's Open	T19		T39		
Women's British Open ^	T21			CUT	T45
LPGA Championship	T25		T15	WD	CUT
The Evian Championship ^^				WD	

^ The Women's British Open replaced the du Maurier Classic as an LPGA major in 2001
^^ The Evian Championship was added as a major in 2013

Win
Top 10
Did not play

CUT = missed the half-way cut
WD = withdrew
T = tied

=== Summary ===
Tournament	Wins	2nd	3rd	Top-5	Top-10	Top-25	Events	Cuts made
Kraft Nabisco Championship	0	0	0	0	0	4	11	9
U.S. Women's Open	0	0	0	0	3	6	11	9
Women's British Open	1	0	0	2	2	6	12	8
LPGA Championship	0	0	0	0	0	7	13	9
du Maurier Classic	0	0	0	0	0	0	1	0
The Evian Championship	0	0	0	0	0	0	1	0
Totals	1	0	0	2	5	23	49	35

- Most consecutive cuts made – 23 (2002 Kraft Nabisco – 2007 U.S. Open)
- Longest streak of top-10s – 1 (five times)

== Team appearances ==
Amateur

- Espirito Santo Trophy (representing South Korea): 1998

Professional

- Lexus Cup (representing Asia team): 2005, 2007 (winners), 2008
- World Cup (representing South Korea): 2005
