= Golf at the 2013 SEA Games – Women's team =

The women's team competition at the 2013 SEA Games in Naypyidaw was held on from 16 December to 18 December at the Royal Myanmar Golf Course.

== Schedule ==
All times are Myanmar Standard Time (UTC+06:30)

Date	Time	Event
Monday, 16 December 2013	08:00	First round
Tuesday, 17 December 2013	07:30	Second round
Wednesday, 18 December 2013	07:30	Third round

== Results ==
Rank	Team	Rounds			Total
Rank	Team	1	2	3	Total
1st place, gold medalist(s)	Philippines (PHI)	144	139	145	428
	Princess Mary Superal	72	66	72	
	Clare Amelia Legaspi	72	~~75~~	73	
	Katrina Pelen-Briones	~~79~~	73	~~77~~	
2nd place, silver medalist(s)	Myanmar (MYA)	147	143	149	439
	Yin May Myo	71	73	72	
	Khin Mar Nwe	76	~~77~~	77	
	May Oo Khine	~~77~~	70	~~78~~	
3rd place, bronze medalist(s)	Thailand (THA)	147	148	145	440
	Benyapa Niphatsophon	~~76~~	73	69	
	Supamas Sangchan	72	75	76	
	Ornnicha Konsunthea	75	~~76~~	~~78~~	
=4	Malaysia (MAS)	150	148	143	441
	Vivienne Ven Yi Chin	~~83~~	~~76~~	71	
	Michelle Lay Sia Koh	72	75	72	
	Nur Durriyah Binti Damian Utal	78	73	~~76~~	
=4	Indonesia (INA)	151	147	143	441
	Tatiana Jaqueline Wijaya	75	73	69	
	Victoria Chanora	~~81~~	74	74	
	Gavrilla Arya	76	~~80~~	~~78~~	
6	Singapore (SIN)	154	153	148	455
	Amanda Tan	77	76	72	
	Wei Ping Amelia Yong	77	~~81~~	76	
	Koh Sock Hwee	~~78~~	77	~~77~~	
