= Chan Yih-shin =

Taiwanese professional golfer

Personal information
- Nationality: Taiwan
- Born: 20 April 1977 (age 49)

Career
- Sport: Golf
- Turned professional: 2002
- Former tours: Asian Tour; Omega China Tour
- Professional wins: 2

Number of wins by tour
- Asian Tour: 2
Medal record
Representing Chinese Taipei
Asian Games
Bronze medal – third place	1998 Bangkok	Men's team

Chan Yih-shin (Chinese: 詹益信; born 20 April 1977) is a Taiwanese professional golfer.

== Professional career ==
In 2002, Chan turned professional. He played on the Asian Tour from 2003–04 and since 2008. He won his first Asian Tour event at the inaugural King's Cup in December 2009.

== Professional wins (2) ==
=== Asian Tour wins (2) ===
No.	Date	Tournament	Winning score	Margin of victory	Runner(s)-up
1	6 Dec 2009	King's Cup	−14 (64-73-67-70=274)	Playoff	(England) Nick Redfern, (Scotland) Simon Yates
2	18 Sep 2011	Macau Open	−14 (66-67-68-69=270)	3 strokes	(Australia) David Gleeson

Asian Tour playoff record (1–0)

No.	Year	Tournament	Opponents	Result
1	2009	King's Cup	(England) Nick Redfern, (Scotland) Simon Yates	Won with birdie on second extra hole

== Results in World Golf Championships ==
Tournament	2011
Match Play	
Championship	
Invitational	
Champions	T72

Did not play

"T" = Tied

== Team appearances ==
Amateur

- Eisenhower Trophy (representing Taiwan): 1998
- Bonallack Trophy (representing Asia/Pacific): 2000
