= 1998 Eisenhower Trophy =

Tournament information
- Dates: 19–22 November
- Location: Santiago, Chile; 33°27′S 70°40′W
- Courses: Club de Golf Los Leones; Club de Golf La Dehesa
- Format: 72 holes stroke play

Statistics
- Par: 71 (Los Leones); 72 (La Dehesa)
- Field: 52 teams 208 players

Champion
- Great Britain & Ireland; Luke Donald, Paddy Gribben, Lorne Kelly & Gary Wolstenholme
- 852 (−6)
- Location in Chile

The 1998 Eisenhower Trophy took place 19 to 22 November at Club de Golf Los Leones and Club de Golf La Dehesa in Santiago, Chile. It was the 21st World Amateur Team Championship for the Eisenhower Trophy. The tournament was a 72-hole stroke play team event with 52 four-man teams. The best three scores for each round counted towards the team total. Each team played two rounds on the two courses. The leading teams played at Club de Golf La Dehesa on the third day and at Club de Golf Los Leones on the final day.

Great Britain and Ireland won the Eisenhower Trophy for the fourth time, finishing four strokes ahead of the silver medalists, Australia. Chinese Taipei took the bronze medal with Japan in fourth place. Finland led after three rounds but a poor last round dropped them into fifth place. Kim Felton, representing Australia, had the lowest individual score, 11-under-par 275, two strokes better than Mikko Ilonen.

== Teams ==
52 four-man teams contested the event.

The following table lists the players on the leading teams.

Country	Players
Australia	Aaron Baddeley, Kim Felton, Brendan Jones, Brett Rumford
Canada	Steven Davies, Stephen Dixon, Jon Drewery, Robert Kerr
Chinese Taipei	Chan Yih-shin, Hong Chia-yuh, Lee Cho-chuan, Su Chin-jung
Denmark	Peter Jespersen, Søren Muller, Mads Vibe-Hastrup, Morten Vildhoej
Finland	Mikko Ilonen, Panu Kylliäinen, Ari Pasanen, Henri Salonen
Germany	Philipp Neels, Benjamin Schlichting, Marcel Siem, Michael Thannhäuser
Great Britain & Ireland	Luke Donald, Paddy Gribben, Lorne Kelly, Gary Wolstenholme
Japan	Hidemasa Hoshino, Tomohiro Kondo, Yūsaku Miyazato, Masahide Wada
South Africa	Henk Alberts, Jean Hugo, Trevor Immelman, Dean Lambert
South Korea	Kim Dae-seb, Kim Hyung-tae, Kim Sung-yoon, Noe Woo-sung
Spain	Sergio García, Alejandro Larrazábal, Álvaro Mata, Raúl Quirós
Sweden	Peter Hanson, Anders Hultman, Christian Nilsson, Henrik Stenson
United States	Joel Kribel, Matt Kuchar, Hank Kuehne, Tom McKnight

== Scores ==
Place	Country	Score	To par
1st place, gold medalist(s)	Great Britain & Ireland	211-218-215-208=852	−6
2nd place, silver medalist(s)	Australia	217-214-213-212=856	−2
3rd place, bronze medalist(s)	Chinese Taipei	217-218-212-211=858	E
4	Japan	217-218-213-211=859	+1
5	Finland	210-214-217-219=860	+2
6	Sweden	214-227-213-207=861	+3
7	United States	209-218-217-221=865	+7
T8	Germany	216-216-221-215=868	+10
T8	Spain	219-217-214-218=868	+10
10	South Africa	218-217-222-213=870	+12
11	South Korea	218-215-220-219=872	+14
12	Denmark	220-221-220-212=873	+15
13	France	222-220-218-215=875	+17
14	Netherlands	227-216-223-212=878	+20
T15	Colombia	218-223-219-219=879	+21
T15	India	219-224-222-214=879	+21
17	Norway	223-217-223-217=880	+22
T18	Argentina	217-228-224-213=882	+24
T18	Brazil	220-215-232-215=882	+24
T18	Puerto Rico	216-212-232-222=882	+24
T21	Italy	223-226-216-218=883	+25
T21	New Zealand	226-214-225-218=883	+25
23	Chile	220-221-217-226=884	+26
24	Canada	225-225-221-214=885	+27
25	Austria	224-223-219-220=886	+28
26	Uruguay	226-221-218-225=890	+32
T27	Belgium	217-225-235-216=893	+35
T27	Mexico	229-225-216-223=893	+35
T29	Malaysia	225-226-224-221=896	+38
T29	Philippines	230-222-217-227=896	+38
31	Zimbabwe	222-229-221-225=897	+39
32	Portugal	227-223-224-231=905	+47
33	Venezuela	227-232-232-217=908	+50
34	Ecuador	224-227-227-233=911	+53
35	Dominican Republic	229-231-222-234=916	+58
36	Switzerland	222-234-234-231=921	+63
37	Peru	232-227-232-232=923	+65
38	Guatemala	235-231-226-235=927	+69
39	Hong Kong	225-234-244-231=934	+76
40	Morocco	235-233-226-241=935	+77
41	Paraguay	234-234-241-229=938	+80
T42	Bermuda	235-235-237-238=945	+87
T42	Costa Rica	240-236-234-235=945	+87
44	Bolivia	247-236-237-232=952	+94
45	Greece	232-247-240-238=957	+99
46	Bahamas	243-241-247-240=971	+113
47	Egypt	248-254-242-244=988	+130
48	El Salvador	248-245-244-252=989	+131
49	Estonia	252-255-242-249=998	+140
50	Croatia	258-260-267-271=1056	+198
51	Slovakia	268-274-264-273=1079	+221
52	Latvia	302-293-286-286=1167	+309

== Individual leaders ==
There was no official recognition for the lowest individual scores.

Place	Player	Country	Score	To par
1	Kim Felton	Australia	70-67-69-69=275	−11
2	Mikko Ilonen	Finland	67-70-71-69=277	−9
T3	Luke Donald	Great Britain & Ireland	70-70-69-71=280	−6
T3	Chan Yih-shin	Chinese Taipei	71-69-72-68=280	−6
5	Wilfredo Morales	Puerto Rico	67-68-75-71=281	−5
6	Gary Wolstenholme	Great Britain & Ireland	70-71-74-67=282	−4
T7	Sergio García	Spain	72-71-69-73=285	−1
T7	Tomohiro Kondo	Japan	75-72-67-71=285	−1
T9	Christian Aronsen	Norway	74-70-76-66=286	E
T9	Kim Hyung-tae	South Korea	72-72-70-72=286	E
