= Golf at the 2002 Asian Games =

- Venue: Asiad Country Club
- Dates: 3–6 October
- Competitors: 82 from 17 nations

Golf was one of the many sports which was held at the 2002 Asian Games in Asiad Country Club, Busan, South Korea between 3 and 6 October 2002.

The event was open to amateur players only. Golf had team and individual events for men and women.

== Medalists ==
Event	Gold	Silver	Bronze
Men's individual	Shiv Kapur; India	Anura Rohana; Sri Lanka	Kim Hyun-woo; South Korea
Men's team	Chinese Taipei; Chang Hong-wei; Cheng Chen-liang; Kao Bo-song; Sung Mao-chang	South Korea; Kim Byung-kwan; Kim Hyun-woo; Kwon Ki-taek; Sung Si-woo	Japan; Toyokazu Fujishima; Futoshi Fujita; Riki Ikeda; Yūsaku Miyazato
Women's individual	Ai Miyazato; Japan	Kim Joo-mi; South Korea	Park Won-Mi; South Korea
Women's team	South Korea; Kim Joo-mi; Park Won-mi; Yim Sung-ah	Japan; Ai Miyazato; Ayako Uehara; Sakura Yokomine	Philippines; Heidi Chua; Ria Quiazon; Carmelette Villaroman

== Medal table ==
Rank	Nation	Gold	Silver	Bronze	Total
1	South Korea (KOR)	1	2	2	5
2	Japan (JPN)	1	1	1	3
3	Chinese Taipei (TPE)	1	0	0	1
3	India (IND)	1	0	0	1
5	Sri Lanka (SRI)	0	1	0	1
6	Philippines (PHI)	0	0	1	1
Totals (6 entries)		4	4	4	12

== Participating nations ==
A total of 82 athletes from 17 nations competed in golf at the 2002 Asian Games:

- Bahrain (4)
- Brunei (4)
- China (4)
- Chinese Taipei (7)
- Hong Kong (2)
- India (4)
- Japan (7)
- Lebanon (6)
- Macau (4)
- Malaysia (4)
- Nepal (4)
- North Korea (4)
- Philippines (7)
- Qatar (4)
- South Korea (7)
- Sri Lanka (3)
- Thailand (7)
