= Choi Hye-jin =

South Korean professional golfer (born 1999)

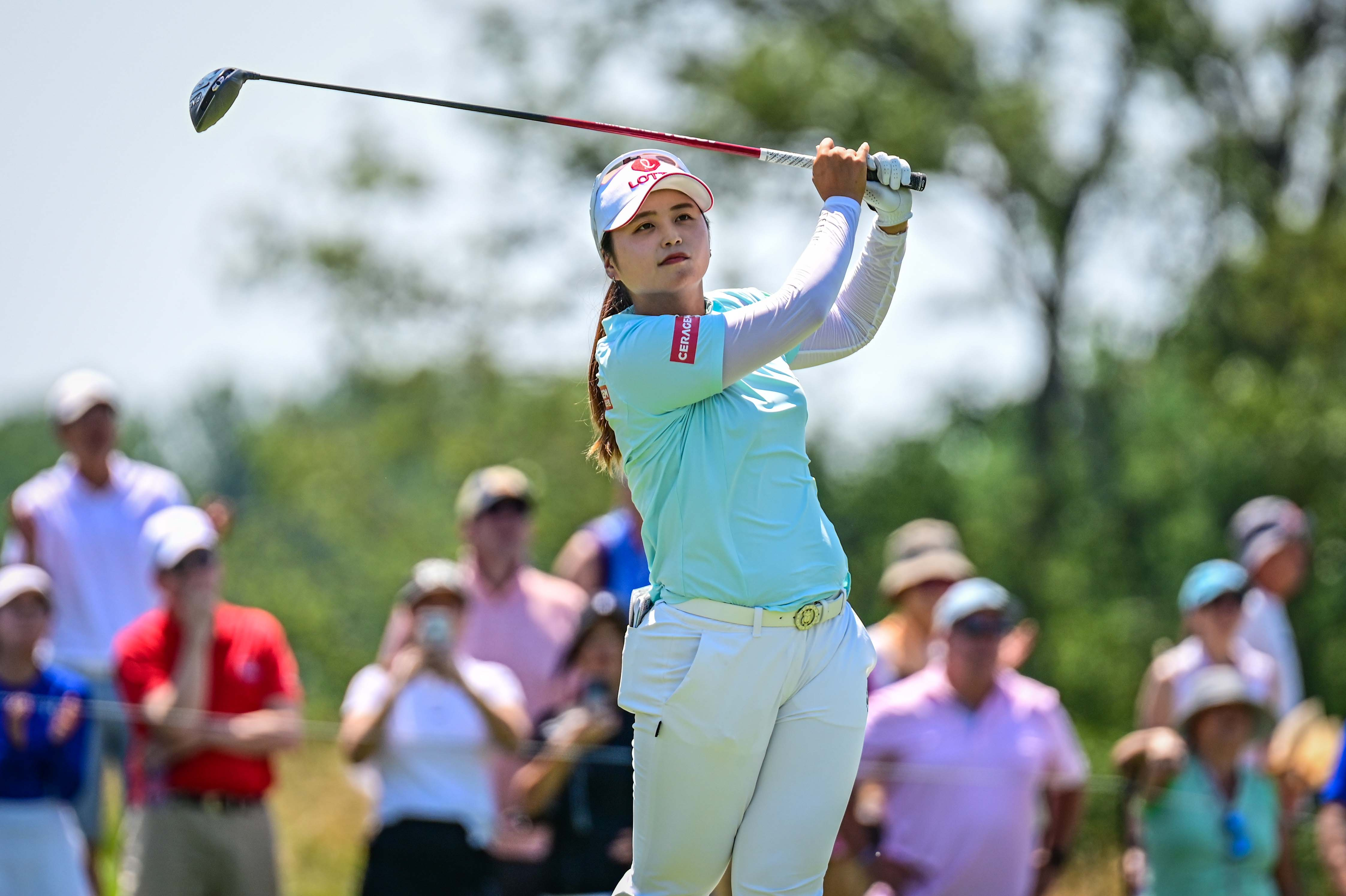
- At the 2022 Women's PGA Championship

Personal information
- Nationality: South Korea
- Born: 23 August 1999 (age 27) Gimhae, Gyeongsangnam-do, South Korea

Career
- Sport: Golf
- Turned professional: 2017
- Current tours: LPGA of Korea Tour; LPGA Tour
- Professional wins: 13

Number of wins by tour
- LPGA of Korea Tour: 12
- Other: 1

Best results in LPGA major championships
- Chevron Championship: T9: 2025
- Women's PGA C'ship: T5: 2022
- U.S. Women's Open: 2nd: 2017
- Women's British Open: T28: 2022
- Evian Championship: T7: 2024

Achievements and awards
- LPGA of Korea Tour leading money winner: 2019
Medal record
Asian Games
Silver medal – second place	2014 Incheon	Women's team

Choi Hye-jin (Korean: 최혜진; born 23 August 1999) is a South Korean professional golfer.

== Amateur career ==
Choi represented South Korea at the 2014 Asian Games where she helped the team to a silver medal and finished fifth in the individual event. She help the Korean team to a third place finish at the 2014 Espirito Santo Trophy.

In 2015, Choi won the World Junior Girls Championship, both individually and with the South Korean team.

Choi won the 2016 Canadian Women's Amateur and was low amateur at the 2016 U.S. Women's Open. She led the Korean team to victory at the 2016 Espirito Santo Trophy. She also finished runner-up at the 2016 New Zealand Women's Open, co-sanctioned by the ALPG Tour and the Ladies European Tour.

Choi won the 2017 Australian Women's Amateur and also won the ChoJung Sparkling Water Yongpyong Resort Open on the 2017 LPGA of Korea Tour. She finished second at the 2017 U.S. Women's Open at the age of seventeen. She was attempting to become the second amateur to win the U.S. Open. She won a second LPGA of Korea Tour event in August 2017, the Bogner-MBN Ladies Open.

== Professional career ==
Choi turned professional in August 2017.

She was runner-up at the 2018 ISPS Handa Women's Australian Open, an LPGA Tour event.

In 2019, she won five events and was LPGA of Korea Tour leading money winner.

Choi earned her card for the 2022 LPGA Tour through qualifying school.

== Amateur wins ==
- 2015 Korean Women's Amateur - KangMinKoo Cup, World Junior Girls Championship (individual)
- 2016 Lake Macquarie International Championship, Neighbors Trophy Team Championship, Hosim Cup, Canadian Women's Amateur, Song Am Cup, Polo Golf Junior Classic
- 2017 Australian Women's Amateur, Neighbors Trophy Team Championship, Queen Sirikit Cup

== Professional wins (13) ==
=== LPGA of Korea Tour wins (12) ===
- 2017 (2) ChoJung Sparkling Water Yongpyong Resort Open (as amateur), Bogner-MBN Ladies Open (as amateur)
- 2018 (2) Hyosung Championship, BC Card-Hankyung Ladies Cup
- 2019 (5) CreaS F&C KLPGA Championship, NH Investment & Securities Ladies Championship, S-Oil Championship, McCol-Yongpyong Resort Open, SK Networks Seokyung Ladies Classic
- 2020 (2) S-Oil Championship, SK Telecom–ADT CAPS Championship
- 2023 (1) Lotte Open

=== Other wins ===
- 2017 LF Point Final Championship

== Playoff record ==
LPGA Tour playoff record (0–1)

No.	Year	Tournament	Opponent(s)	Result
1	2025	Maybank Championship	(Australia) Hannah Green (Japan) Miyū Yamashita	Yamashita won with birdie on first extra hole

== Results in LPGA majors ==
Results not in chronological order.

Tournament	2016	2017	2018	2019	2020	2021	2022	2023	2024	2025	2026
Chevron Championship			T48				T17	17	T46	T9	T21
U.S. Women's Open	T38	2	T27		T30		3	T20	CUT	T4	T49
Women's PGA Championship							T5	T52	T16	T8	T24
The Evian Championship		T14		T49	NT		T22	T48	T7	T14	CUT
Women's British Open			CUT	CUT			T28	T66	T37	CUT	CUT

Top 10
Did not play

CUT = missed the half-way cut
T = tied
NT = no tournament

=== Summary ===
Tournament	Wins	2nd	3rd	Top-5	Top-10	Top-25	Events	Cuts made
Chevron Championship	0	0	0	0	1	4	6	6
U.S. Women's Open	0	1	1	3	3	4	9	8
Women's PGA Championship	0	0	0	1	2	4	5	5
The Evian Championship	0	0	0	0	1	4	7	6
Women's British Open	0	0	0	0	0	0	7	3
Totals	0	1	1	4	7	16	34	28

- Most consecutive cuts made – 13 (2019 Evian – 2023 Chevron)
- Longest streak of top-10s – 3 (2025 Chevron – 2025 Women's PGA)

== World ranking ==
Position in Women's World Golf Rankings at the end of each calendar year.

Year	Ranking	Source
2014	605	
2015	274	
2016	144	
2017	12	
2018	22	
2019	27	
2020	25	
2021	55	
2022	20	
2023	35	
2024	41	
2025	16	

== Team appearances ==
Amateur

- Asian Games (representing South Korea): 2014
- Espirito Santo Trophy (representing South Korea): 2014, 2016 (winners)
- Patsy Hankins Trophy (representing Asia/Pacific): 2016 (winners)
- World Junior Girls Championship (representing South Korea): 2015 (winners)

Professional

- International Crown (representing South Korea): 2023, 2025
