= Pranavi Urs =

Indian golfer (born 2003)

Personal information
- Full name: Pranavi Sharath Urs
- Nationality: India
- Born: 15 April 2003 (age 23) Mysore, Karnataka, India

Career
- Sport: Golf
- Status: Professional
- Current tour: Ladies European Tour
Medal record
Asian Games
| Gold medal – first place | 2026 Aichi–Nagoya | Women's individual |
| Silver medal – second place | 2026 Aichi–Nagoya | Women's team |

Pranavi Urs (born 15 April 2003) is an Indian professional golfer. She won the gold medal in golf at the 2026 Asian Games in Japan.

She won the second and third legs of the 2020 Hero Women's Pro Golf Tour.

In 2024, she came third in the Andalucia Costa Del Sol Open De España on the Ladies European Tour (LET), equalling her earlier best performance on the LET at the Helsingborg Open.
