= Golf at the 2014 Asian Games – Women's team =

Women's team at the 2014 Asian Games
- Venue: Dream Park Country Club
- Date: 25 September 2014 – 28 September 2014
- Competitors: 31 from 11 nations

Medalists
gold medal	Thailand; Benyapa Niphatsophon, Supamas Sangchan, Budsabakorn Sukapan
silver medal	South Korea; Choi Hye-jin, Lee So-young, Park Gyeol
bronze medal	China; Shi Yuting, Wang Xinying, Ye Ziqi

The women's team competition at the 2014 Asian Games in Incheon, South Korea was held from 25 September to 28 September at the Dream Park Country Club.

== Schedule ==
All times are Korea Standard Time (UTC+09:00)

Date	Time	Event
Thursday, 25 September 2014	07:20	Round 1
Friday, 26 September 2014	07:20	Round 2
Saturday, 27 September 2014	07:20	Round 3
Sunday, 28 September 2014	06:50	Round 4

== Results ==
Rank	Team	Round				Total	To par
Rank	Team	1	2	3	4	Total	To par
1st place, gold medalist(s)	Thailand (THA)	135	136	135	132	538	−38
	Benyapa Niphatsophon	~~73~~	69	~~75~~	65		
	Supamas Sangchan	67	~~72~~	67	~~68~~		
	Budsabakorn Sukapan	68	67	68	67		
2nd place, silver medalist(s)	South Korea (KOR)	138	138	137	132	545	−31
	Choi Hye-jin	70	~~72~~	70	68		
	Lee So-young	68	71	~~71~~	~~70~~		
	Park Gyeol	~~71~~	67	67	64		
3rd place, bronze medalist(s)	China (CHN)	141	141	144	133	559	−17
	Shi Yuting	~~74~~	70	70	65		
	Wang Xinying	71	~~73~~	~~75~~	~~73~~		
	Ye Ziqi	70	71	74	68		
4	Japan (JPN)	142	144	139	140	565	−11
	Minami Katsu	69	69	~~72~~	70		
	Yumi Matsubara	~~73~~	75	72	70		
	Eri Okayama	73	~~76~~	67	~~79~~		
5	Philippines (PHI)	139	145	143	144	571	−5
	Pauline del Rosario	~~78~~	~~73~~	~~75~~	~~75~~		
	Mia Legaspi	70	72	71	74		
	Princess Superal	69	73	72	70		
6	Hong Kong (HKG)	143	149	140	146	578	+2
	Tiffany Chan	74	67	68	73		
	Kitty Tam	69	82	72	73		
7	Chinese Taipei (TPE)	144	150	141	144	579	+3
	Chen Chi-hui	~~75~~	76	71	73		
	Cheng Ssu-chia	71	74	70	71		
	Hung Jo-hua	73	~~78~~	~~72~~	~~75~~		
8	India (IND)	150	147	141	149	587	+11
	Aditi Ashok	~~78~~	75	71	75		
	Astha Madan	75	~~79~~	~~78~~	~~78~~		
	Gurbani Singh	75	72	70	74		
9	Macau (MAC)	178	169	169	177	693	+117
	Demi Mak	78	77	75	79		
	Ginger Mak	100	92	94	98		
10	Mongolia (MGL)	183	187	176	168	714	+138
	Byambajavyn Batnaran	~~103~~	~~102~~	~~97~~	~~92~~		
	Damdinsürengiin Bayarmaa	91	87	90	87		
	Altansükhiin Enerel	92	100	86	81		
11	Kazakhstan (KAZ)	200	216	204	208	828	+252
	Inna Khegay	106	111	106	~~112~~		
	Jumagul Polozhentseva	94	105	98	101		
	Anna Streltsova	~~110~~	~~113~~	~~113~~	107		
