= Supamas Sangchan =

Thai professional golfer

Personal information
- Nickname: Aom (ออม)
- Nationality: Thailand
- Born: 2 April 1996 (age 30) Sukhothai, Thailand
- Height: 169 cm (5 ft 7 in)

Career
- Sport: Golf
- Turned professional: 2015
- Current tour: China LPGA Tour (joined 2015)
- Former tour: Ladies European Tour
- Professional wins: 6

Number of wins by tour
- Ladies European Tour: 1
- Other: 5

Best results in LPGA major championships
- Chevron Championship: DNP
- Women's PGA C'ship: DNP
- U.S. Women's Open: T58: 2017
- Women's British Open: DNP
- Evian Championship: CUT: 2017

Achievements and awards
- Thai LPGA Tour Order of Merit: 2015
Medal record
Youth Olympic Games
Bronze medal – third place	2014 Nanjing	Individual
Asian Games
Gold medal – first place	2014 Incheon	Team
Bronze medal – third place	2014 Incheon	Individual
SEA Games
Bronze medal – third place	2013 Myanmar	Team

Supamas Sangchan (Thai: สุภมาส แสงจันทร์; born 2 April 1996) is a Thai professional golfer playing on the China LPGA Tour. As an amateur, she won a gold medal at the 2014 Asian Games in the women's team event with Budsabakorn Sukapan and Benyapa Niphatsophon and another bronze medal in the women's individual event. In 2016, Sangchan captured her first Ladies European Tour title at the Sanya Ladies Open in China.

== Early life and amateur career ==
Sangchan was born on 2 April 1996 in Sukhothai, Thailand. She started playing golf at the age of eight.

Sangchan competed at the 2014 Asian Games in Incheon and won the first ever gold medal in golf for Thailand in the women's team event with Budsabakorn Sukapan and Benyapa Niphatsophon. She also won a bronze medal in the women's individual event.

At the 2014 Summer Youth Olympics in Nanjing, Sangchan won a bronze medal in the women's individual event.

== Professional career ==
Sangchan turned professional in 2015 and participated in the China LPGA Tour in the same year. On 30 October 2016, Sangchan captured her first Ladies European Tour title at the Sanya Ladies Open in Sanya, China. With this victory, she won the qualifications to two major championships, the Women's British Open and the Evian Championship.

Supamas was in the top three of the China LPGA Tour Order of Merit for three consecutive years from 2016 to 2018 and was awarded entries into the U.S. Women's Open. She made the cut at the 2017 U.S. Women's Open and finished with a tied for 58th place.

== Amateur wins ==
- 2013 Students of Thailand Championship, Queen Sirikit Cup, Philippine Junior Championship
- 2014 Philippine Ladies Open

== Professional wins (6) ==
=== Ladies European Tour wins (1) ===
No.	Date	Tournament	Winning score	To par	Margin of victory	Runner-up
1	30 Oct 2016	Sanya Ladies Open^	70-70-68=208	−8	1 stroke	(Sweden) Caroline Hedwall

^Co-sanctioned by the Ladies Asian Golf Tour and the China LPGA Tour

=== China LPGA Tour wins (2) ===
- 2016 Sanya Ladies Open
- 2017 EFG Hong Kong Ladies Open

=== Taiwan LPGA Tour wins (2) ===
- 2017 EFG Hong Kong Ladies Open^
- 2018 Hitachi Ladies Classic

^Co-sanctioned by the Ladies Asian Golf Tour and the China LPGA Tour

=== Thai LPGA Tour wins (2) ===
- 2015 6th Singha-SAT Thai LPGA Championship
- 2019 1st Singha-SAT Thai LPGA Championship

=== All Thailand Golf Tour wins (1) ===
- 2014 Singha Championship (as an amateur)

== Results in LPGA majors ==
Results not in chronological order.

Tournament	2017	2018	2019
The Chevron Championship			
U.S. Women's Open	T58	CUT	CUT
Women's PGA Championship			
The Evian Championship	CUT		
Women's British Open			

Did not play

CUT = missed the half-way cut
"T" = tied

== Team appearances ==
Amateur

- Espirito Santo Trophy (representing Thailand): 2012
- Queen Sirikit Cup (representing Thailand): 2012, 2013, 2014
