= Golf at the 2010 Asian Games – Men's team =

Men's team at the 2010 Asian Games
- Venue: Dragon Lake Golf Club
- Date: 17 November 2010 – 20 November 2010
- Competitors: 75 from 19 nations

Medalists
gold medal	South Korea; Kim Meen-whee, Lee Jae-hyeok, Lee Kyoung-hoon, Park Il-hwan
silver medal	India; Rahul Bajaj, Abhijit Singh Chadha, Rashid Khan, Abhinav Lohan
bronze medal	Chinese Taipei; Hsieh Chi-hsien, Huang Tao, Hung Chien-yao, Yang Fei-hao

The men's team competition at the 2010 Asian Games in Guangzhou was held from 17 November to 20 November at the Dragon Lake Golf Club.

== Schedule ==
All times are China Standard Time (UTC+08:00)

Date	Time	Event
Wednesday, 17 November 2010	07:00	First round
Thursday, 18 November 2010	07:00	Second round
Friday, 19 November 2010	07:00	Third round
Saturday, 20 November 2010	07:00	Fourth round

== Results ==
Legend

- DNS — Did not start
- DSQ — Disqualified

Rank	Team	Round				Total	To par
Rank	Team	1	2	3	4	Total	To par
1st place, gold medalist(s)	South Korea (KOR)	210	208	206	218	842	−22
	Kim Meen-whee	69	68	67	69		
	Lee Jae-hyeok	69	70	~~74~~	78		
	Lee Kyoung-hoon	~~75~~	70	69	71		
	Park Il-hwan	72	~~72~~	70	~~79~~		
2nd place, silver medalist(s)	India (IND)	227	209	222	216	874	+10
	Rahul Bajaj	81	~~79~~	~~78~~	72		
	Abhijit Singh Chadha	~~DSQ~~	71	74	~~76~~		
	Rashid Khan	71	68	74	72		
	Abhinav Lohan	75	70	74	72		
3rd place, bronze medalist(s)	Chinese Taipei (TPE)	224	218	220	213	875	+11
	Hsieh Chi-hsien	76	~~76~~	75	~~76~~		
	Huang Tao	77	74	72	69		
	Hung Chien-yao	71	70	73	69		
	Yang Fei-hao	~~81~~	74	~~80~~	75		
4	Thailand (THA)	226	215	212	222	875	+11
	Atthachai Jaichalad	73	73	65	74		
	Poom Saksansin	78	73	75	75		
	Wasin Sripattranusorn	75	69	72	73		
5	Philippines (PHI)	218	217	218	224	877	+13
	Jerson Balasabas	73	74	~~79~~	~~80~~		
	Mhark Fernando	77	~~75~~	73	73		
	Marcel Puyat	~~80~~	75	71	79		
	Miguel Tabuena	68	68	74	72		
6	Japan (JPN)	224	217	218	219	878	+14
	Masahiro Kawamura	~~75~~	~~78~~	~~75~~	74		
	Satoshi Kodaira	74	68	73	73		
	Kenta Konishi	75	72	75	~~76~~		
	Hideki Matsuyama	75	77	70	72		
7	China (CHN)	227	218	214	226	885	+21
	Huang Wenyi	76	74	~~75~~	74		
	Liu Yuxiang	77	~~75~~	71	78		
	Wei Wei	~~80~~	74	72	74		
	Zhang Xinjun	74	70	71	~~79~~		
8	Singapore (SIN)	229	218	224	221	892	+28
	Choo Tze Huang	76	72	76	73		
	Gregory Raymund Foo	76	~~76~~	75	73		
	Johnson Poh	~~78~~	70	~~81~~	75		
	Joshua Shou	77	76	73	~~78~~		
9	Hong Kong (HKG)	226	220	229	223	898	+34
	Chan Chun Hung	75	~~80~~	78	71		
	Hak Shun Yat	74	67	75	81		
	Steven Lam	77	80	~~84~~	~~83~~		
	Konstantin Liu	~~84~~	73	76	71		
10	Bangladesh (BAN)	224	222	229	225	900	+36
	Md Dulal Hossain	~~82~~	~~79~~	76	73		
	Md Jakiruzzaman Jakir	75	75	~~82~~	~~79~~		
	Md Sayum Miah	74	74	76	78		
	Shakhawat Hossain Sohel	75	73	77	74		
11	Malaysia (MAS)	237	228	224	214	903	+39
	Chan Tuck Soon	76	75	73	75		
	Kenneth de Silva	79	~~84~~	~~78~~	75		
	Mohd Arie Irawan	82	74	73	64		
	Mohd Iylia Jamil	~~86~~	79	78	~~76~~		
12	Sri Lanka (SRI)	223	228	232	226	909	+45
	Vijitha Bandara	78	79	76	~~80~~		
	Tissa Chandradasa	~~80~~	75	~~78~~	78		
	Mithun Perera	69	74	78	73		
	Nadaraja Thangarajah	76	~~85~~	78	75		
13	Lebanon (LIB)	241	237	241	242	961	+97
	Rachid Akl	~~90~~	~~87~~	85	80		
	Mazen Hamdan	77	78	81	84		
	Ali Hammoud	80	76	75	78		
	Mehdi Ramadan	84	83	~~86~~	~~85~~		
14	Qatar (QAT)	265	238	257	241	1001	+137
	Abdulaziz Al-Bishi	~~95~~	~~88~~	91	~~90~~		
	Ali Al-Bishi	87	78	78	81		
	Saleh Al-Kaabi	91	84	~~93~~	81		
	Jeham Al-Kuwari	87	76	88	79		
15	Saudi Arabia (KSA)	255	262	252	244	1013	+149
	Khalid Al-Attieh	72	79	75	74		
	Fahad Al-Mansour	91	93	94	87		
	Othman Al-Mulla	92	90	83	83		
	Nouh Reza	~~105~~	~~97~~	~~96~~	~~94~~		
15	Vietnam (VIE)	262	254	250	247	1013	+149
	Đỗ Lê Gia Đạt	96	89	85	92		
	Nguyễn Trí Dũng	~~107~~	~~109~~	~~110~~	~~96~~		
	Phạm Minh Đức	85	80	79	77		
	Trịnh Văn Thọ	81	85	86	78		
17	Macau (MAC)	257	255	254	256	1022	+158
	Ao Ka Wai	~~91~~	~~91~~	87	84		
	Chan Sio Peng	91	87	~~88~~	~~89~~		
	Tang Chak Hou	87	86	82	85		
	Yan Sihuang	79	82	85	87		
18	Nepal (NEP)	270	254	254	258	1036	+172
	Tashi Ghale	86	89	83	87		
	Nima Gelu Goparma	~~DNS~~	~~DNS~~	~~DNS~~	~~DNS~~		
	Neeraj Shamsher Rana	95	88	92	87		
	Tashi Tsering	89	77	79	84		
19	Mongolia (MGL)	286	259	275	271	1091	+227
	Yanjivyn Bayarkhüü	~~108~~	~~97~~	~~99~~	~~97~~		
	Gangaagiin Mendsaikhan	94	87	94	88		
	Boldbaataryn Mönkhbaatar	95	90	91	90		
	Delgermaagiin Ölziidelger	97	82	90	93		
