= Rahul Bajaj (golfer) =

Indian professional golfer (born 1986)

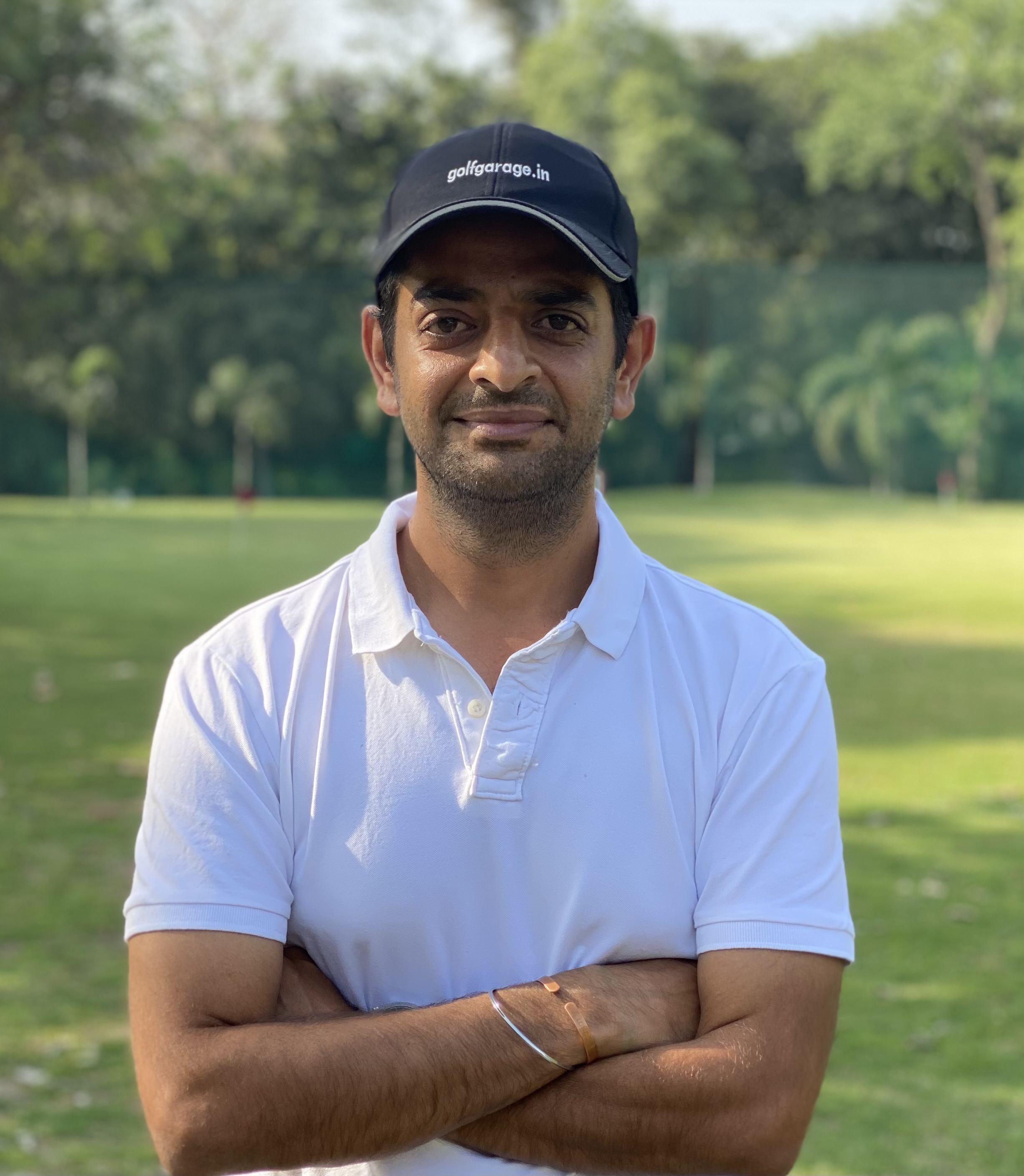
- Bajaj at the Noida Golf Course

Personal information
- Nationality: India
- Born: 18 August 1986 (age 40) Jammu, Jammu and Kashmir, India
- Height: 5 ft 10 in (178 cm)

Career
- Sport: Golf
- Turned professional: 2011
- Former tours: Asian Tour; Professional Golf Tour of India
- Professional wins: 1
Medal record
2010 Asian Games
Silver medal – second place	2010 Guangzhou	Men's team

Rahul Bajaj (born 18 August 1986) is an Indian professional golfer. As an amateur, he was part of the Indian team that won the silver medal at the 2010 Asian Games. Bajaj turned professional a year later at the 2011 Indian Open. He played on the Professional Golf Tour of India (PGTI) between from 2012 to 2018 and won once on the PGTI's Feeder Tour, in 2012. He also played on the Asian Tour, Asian Development Tour (ADT), the MENA Tour.

Bajaj currently teaches golf at Noida Golf Course and runs his own online golf equipment company.

== Background ==
Rahul was born in Jammu, in the state of Jammu and Kashmir. His father is Col. Pradeep Kumar Bajaj, a now retired Army Officer. His mother is Suman Bajaj is a designer who owns her own boutique. His sister Shweta Bajaj is a freelance journalist who has in the past worked for Zee News and News X.

Bajaj went to Army Public School in Noida. He also has a Commerce degree from Delhi University's School of Open Learning. As a child, Rahul watched his father play golf at Noida Golf Course (NGC). He took up the game himself at the age of 15.

== Amateur career ==
In 2006, Bajaj started participating in amateur tournaments organized by the Indian Golf Union. He won his first amateur tournament at the Jaypee Amateur Golf Tournament in 2008 by a single shot over Gagan Verma. Other notable wins include the Samarvir Sahi Amateur in 2009, and the Chandigarh Open in 2010. During this span, he also finished in the top-3 in a few amateur events

Bajaj was part of the Asian Games team in 2010 that won the team silver in Guangzhou. Other team members included Rashid Khan, Abhinav Lohan, and Abhijit Singh Chadha. He was also part of the team that won silver at the 2010 South Asian Games. The team at Dhaka included Chikkarangappa, and Ashbeer Singh Saini who were joined by Khan and Bajaj. As part of the Indian Golf Team, Bajaj represented his country at the 2010 Eisenhower Trophy where the team finished T45.

== Professional career ==
Bajaj turned professional at the 2011 Indian Open. Between 2012 and 2018, he played on the Professional Golf Tour of India. He has also played events on the Asian Tour, Asian Development Tour (ADT), the MENA Tour.

He won his first event as a professional at the 2012 PGTI Feeder Tour event held at Rambagh Golf Club in Jaipur. Bajaj shot scores of 69, 68, 67 over three days to beat his nearest competitors Mandeo Singh Pathania and Akshay Sharma by three shots.

Two years later, Bajaj lost a playoff at the same event to Akshay Sharma to finish second. In 2016, he led the field after the first round of the Asian Tour's Qualifying School Final Stage.

Post-2018, Bajaj has reduced the number of events that he plays professionally to concentrate on teaching golf at Noida Golf Course. He also runs an online golf equipment company called Golf Garage India.

== Amateur wins ==
- 2008 Jaypee Amateur Golf Tournament
- 2009 Samarvir Sahi Amateur
- 2010 Chandigarh Open

== Professional wins (1) ==
=== Other wins (1) ===
No.	Date	Tournament	Winning score	Margin of victory	Runners-up
1	25 Oct 2012	PGTI Feeder Tour Jaipur	−6 (69-68-67=204)	3 strokes	(India) Mandeo Singh Pathania, (India) Akshay Sharma

== Team appearances ==
Amateur

- Eisenhower Trophy (representing India): 2010
- Asian Games (representing India): 2010
- South Asian Games (representing India): 2010
