= Yūsaku Miyazato =

Japanese professional golfer

Yūsaku Miyazato 宮里 優作
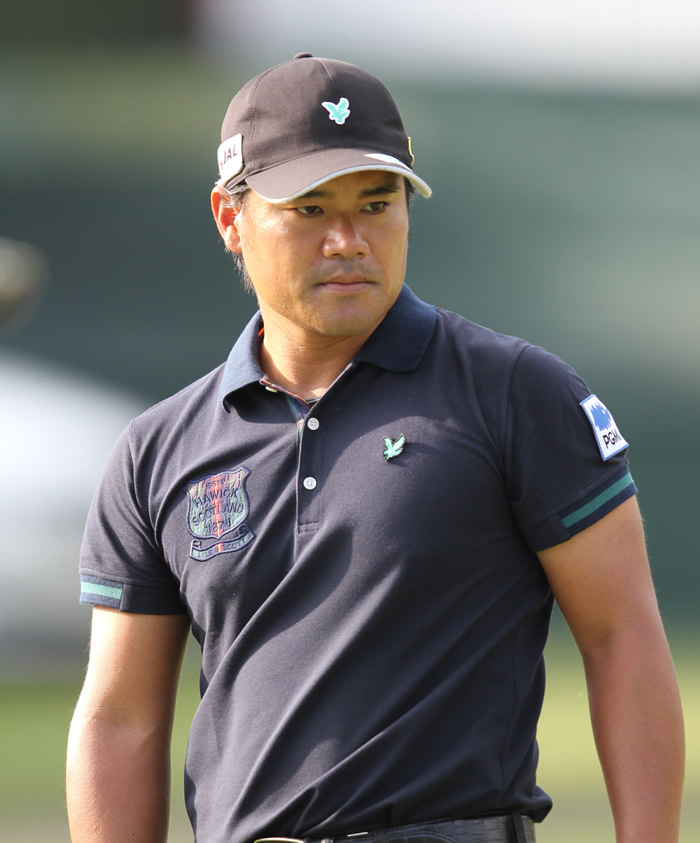
- Miyazato in 2015

Personal information
- Nationality: Japan
- Born: 19 June 1980 (age 46) Higashi, Okinawa, Japan
- Height: 1.70 m (5 ft 7 in)
- Weight: 70 kg (154 lb; 11 st 0 lb)

Career
- Sport: Golf
- College: Tohoku Fukushi University
- Turned professional: 2002
- Current tour: Japan Golf Tour
- Professional wins: 8
- Highest ranking: 50 (31 December 2017)

Number of wins by tour
- Japan Golf Tour: 7
- Other: 1

Best results in major championships
- Masters Tournament: CUT: 2018
- PGA Championship: CUT: 2018
- U.S. Open: T23: 2016
- The Open Championship: T47: 2018

Achievements and awards
- Japan Golf Tour money list winner: 2017
- Japan Golf Tour Most Valuable Player: 2017
Medal record
Asian Games
| Gold medal – first place | 1998 Bangkok | Men's team |
| Bronze medal – third place | 2002 Busan | Men's team |

Yūsaku Miyazato (宮里 優作, Miyazato Yūsaku; born 19 June 1980) is a Japanese professional golfer. In 2006, he became the first modern-era golfer to make two hole in one shots in the same round of a PGA Tour event, at the Reno-Tahoe Open in Nevada.

== Early life and amateur career ==
Miyazato was born in Higashi, Okinawa Prefecture, Japan. He attended Tohoku Fukushi University, and won the Japanese collegiate championship in 2000, and the Japanese Amateur Championship in 2001. In December 2002, he announced his decision to turn pro before his upcoming graduation. He currently plays on the Japan Golf Tour.

== Professional career ==
At the time of his holes in one, the PGA Tour announced that it was the first time since they had started keeping records. However, research later turned up confirming that an amateur golfer, W.W. "Bill" Whedon, also hit two in the opening round of the 1955 Insurance City Open.

In November 2015, Miyazato won the Dunlop Phoenix event, one of the more prestigious events on the Japan Golf Tour to earn his third tour level victory. He shot rounds of 64-69 on the weekend to win by two strokes. In April 2017, Miyazato won his fourth event on the Japanese Tour, The Crowns, followed two weeks later by another win in the Japan PGA Championship Nissin Cupnoodles Cup.

At the 2017 Indonesian Masters, Miyazato finished in solo 4th, earning enough Official World Golf Ranking points to finish the year in the Top 50, thus earning an invitation to the 2018 Masters Tournament, his first appearance.

== Personal life ==
His older brother, Kiyoshi, won once on the Japan Golf Tour.

His younger sister, Ai Miyazato, was also a professional golfer and competed on the LPGA Tour. She was the top-ranked golfer in the Women's World Golf Rankings on three occasions in 2010.

== Professional wins (8) ==
=== Japan Golf Tour wins (7) ===
Legend
Japan majors (3)
Other Japan Golf Tour (4)

| No. | Date | Tournament | Winning score | Margin of victory | Runner(s)-up |
|---|---|---|---|---|---|
| 1 | 8 Dec 2013 | Golf Nippon Series JT Cup | −13 (66-66-64-71=267) | 3 strokes | (China) Wu Ashun |
| 2 | 20 Apr 2014 | Token Homemate Cup | −6 (71-66-68-65=270) | 2 strokes | (Japan) Hiroshi Iwata |
| 3 | 22 Nov 2015 | Dunlop Phoenix Tournament | −14 (67-70-64-69=270) | 2 strokes | (Japan) Yoshinori Fujimoto, (Japan) Hideki Matsuyama |
| 4 | 30 Apr 2017 | The Crowns | −13 (67-65-67-68=267) | 1 stroke | (Japan) Yoshinori Fujimoto, (Japan) Toru Taniguchi |
| 5 | 14 May 2017 | Japan PGA Championship Nissin Cupnoodles Cup | −12 (71-66-73-66=276) | 3 strokes | (Australia) Brad Kennedy |
| 6 | 8 Oct 2017 | Honma TourWorld Cup | −22 (61-68-65-68=262) | 3 strokes | (Japan) Shingo Katayama |
| 7 | 3 Dec 2017 | Golf Nippon Series JT Cup (2) | −15 (69-69-65-62=265) | 6 strokes | (South Africa) Shaun Norris |

=== Other wins (1) ===
- 2013 Kyusyu Open

== Results in major championships ==
| Tournament | 2014 | 2015 | 2016 | 2017 | 2018 |
|---|---|---|---|---|---|
| Masters Tournament | | | | | CUT |
| U.S. Open | | | T23 | T60 | |
| The Open Championship | CUT | | CUT | CUT | T47 |
| PGA Championship | | | | | CUT |

Did not play

CUT = missed the half-way cut
"T" = tied for place

== Results in World Golf Championships ==
| Tournament | 2016 | 2017 | 2018 |
|---|---|---|---|
| Championship | T61 | | T60 |
| Match Play | | | T52 |
| Invitational | | | |
| Champions | | | |

Did not play

QF, R16, R32, R64 = Round in which player lost in match play
"T" = tied

== Team appearances ==
Amateur

- Eisenhower Trophy (representing Japan): 1998, 2000, 2002
- Bonallack Trophy (representing Asia/Pacific): 2000, 2002 (winners)
