= Golf at the 1982 Asian Games =

Golf made its debut as an official medal sport at the 1982 Asian Games in New Delhi, India.

== Medalists ==
Event	Gold	Silver	Bronze
Individual	Lakshman Singh; India	Rajiv Mohta; India	Tetsuo Sakata; Japan
Team	India; Amit Luthra; Rajiv Mohta; Rishi Narain; Lakshman Singh	South Korea; Kim Byung-hoon; Kim Joo-heun; Kim Ki-sub; Kim Sung-ho	Japan; Noriaki Kimura; Masayuki Naito; Kiyotaka Oie; Tetsuo Sakata

== Medal table ==
Rank	Nation	Gold	Silver	Bronze	Total
1	India (IND)	2	1	0	3
2	South Korea (KOR)	0	1	0	1
3	Japan (JPN)	0	0	2	2
Totals (3 entries)		2	2	2	6
