= Golf at the 2026 Asian Games – Women's individual =

Golf – Women's individual at the 2026 Asian Games
- Venue: Kasugai Country Club
- Date: 30 September 2026 – 3 October 2026
- Competitors: 45 from 19 nations

Medalists
gold medal	Pranavi Urs	India
silver medal	Yin Ruoning	China
bronze medal	Shannon Tan	Singapore

The women's individual competition at the 2026 Asian Games in Nagoya and Aichi, Japan was held from 30 September to 3 October 2026 at the Kasugai Country Club.

== Schedule ==
All times are Japan Standard Time (UTC+09:00)

Date	Time	Event
Wednesday, 30 September 2026	11:20	Round 1
Thursday, 1 October 2026	06:30	Round 2
Friday, 2 October 2026	09:19	Round 3
Saturday, 3 October 2026	06:10	Round 4

== Results ==
Rank	Athlete	Round				Total	To par
Rank	Athlete	1	2	3	4	Total	To par
1st place, gold medalist(s)	Pranavi Urs (IND)	66	63	66	70	265	−15
T2	Yin Ruoning (CHN)	67	66	66	67	266	−14
T2	Shannon Tan (SGP)	63	64	71	68	266	−14
4	Yang Yun-seo (KOR)	68	65	72	68	273	−7
T5	Rianne Malixi (PHI)	70	66	71	67	274	−6
T5	Liu Yan (CHN)	71	66	71	66	274	−6
T5	Arpichaya Yubol (THA)	67	74	66	67	274	−6
8	Sophie Han (HKG)	70	67	67	71	275	−5
T9	Yani Tseng (TPE)	71	69	68	68	276	−4
T9	Aira Nagasawa (JPN)	69	71	72	64	276	−4
T11	Pei-Yun Chien (TPE)	69	69	72	68	278	−2
T11	Hsu Wei-ling (TPE)	67	70	72	69	278	−2
13	Virginie Ding (HKG)	70	67	70	72	279	−1
14	Aditi Ashok (IND)	71	74	70	67	282	+2
T15	Arianna Lau (HKG)	70	70	71	72	283	+3
T15	Bianca Pagdanganan (PHI)	67	74	71	71	283	+3
T15	Park Seo-jin (KOR)	71	73	74	65	283	+3
T15	Patcharajutar Kongkraphan (THA)	69	70	74	70	283	+3
T19	Zhang Weiwei (CHN)	69	69	72	74	284	+4
T19	Ai Goto (JPN)	72	72	72	68	284	+4
21	Kim Gyu-been (KOR)	68	73	78	70	289	+9
22	Chen Xingtong (SGP)	69	73	78	70	290	+10
T23	Natthakritta Vongtaveelap (THA)	74	70	74	74	292	+12
T23	Diksha Dagar (IND)	71	73	71	77	292	+12
T25	Amanda Tan (SGP)	72	73	75	73	293'	+13
T25	Mamika Shinchi (JPN)	72	70	75	76	293'	+13
27	Elaine Widjaja (INA)	73	73	73	79	298	+18
28	Holly Victoria Halim (INA)	72	75			147	+7
CUT	Dilyara Bulambayeva (KAZ)	71	77			148	+8
CUT	Nguyễn Khánh Linh (VIE)	73	75			148	+8
CUT	Kristina Natalia Yoko (INA)	73	75			148	+8
CUT	Aasiya Saleem (UAE)	72	78			150	+10
CUT	Pauline del Rosario (PHI)	78	73			151'	+11
CUT	Intissar Rich (UAE)	75	76			151'	+11
CUT	Lê Nguyễn Minh Anh (VIE)	72	80			152	+12
CUT	Jamie Camero (UAE)	76	78			154	+14
CUT	Hun Teng Teng (MAC)	82	80			162	+22
CUT	Yanjinlkham Batdelger (MGL)	81	83			164	+24
CUT	Yasmin Thaher (PLE)	81	84			165	+25
CUT	Nazanin Shahraki (IRI)	85	87			172	+32
CUT	Islamiya Abeldi (KAZ)	89	88			177	+37
CUT	Tara Karki (NEP)	91	94			185	+45
CUT	Telmen Khasar (MGL)	91	96			187	+47
CUT	Altanbileg Gantumur (MGL)	88	100			188	+48
WD	Nada Mir (QAT)						

=== Playoff ===
Rank	Athlete	Hole
Rank	Athlete	1
2nd place, silver medalist(s)	Yin Ruoning (CHN)	4
3rd place, bronze medalist(s)	Shannon Tan (SGP)	5
