= Golf at the 1986 Asian Games =

- Venue: Hanyang Country Club Course
- Dates: 21–24 September 1986

Golf was one of the many sports which was held at the 1986 Asian Games in Hanyang Country Club Course, Seoul, South Korea between 21 and 24 September 1986.

The competition included only men's events, individual and team.

== Medalists ==
Event	Gold	Silver	Bronze
Individual	Ramon Brobio; Philippines	Kim Ki-sub; South Korea	Takahiro Nakagawa; Japan
Team	South Korea; Kim Jong-pil; Kim Ki-sub; Kim Sung-ho; Kwak Yu-hyun	Japan; Takahiro Nakagawa; Tomio Otomo; Tetsuo Sakata; Tsuyoshi Yoneyama	Philippines; Ramon Brobio; Robert Pactolerin; Wilfredo Victoria; Carito Villaroman

== Medal table ==
Rank	Nation	Gold	Silver	Bronze	Total
1	South Korea (KOR)	1	1	0	2
2	Philippines (PHI)	1	0	1	2
3	Japan (JPN)	0	1	1	2
Totals (3 entries)		2	2	2	6
