= Golf at the 2006 Asian Games =

- Venue: Doha Golf Club
- Dates: 8–11 December
- Competitors: 93 from 18 nations

Golf was contested at the 2006 Asian Games in Doha, Qatar. Men's and women's individual and team events were played at the Doha Golf Club over four rounds from 8 to 11 December. The men played at 7181 yards with a par 72. The Ladies played at 5751 yards with a par 73.

== Medalists ==
Event	Gold	Silver	Bronze
Men's individual	Kim Kyung-tae; South Korea	Pan Cheng-tsung; Chinese Taipei	Michael Bibat; Philippines
Men's team	South Korea; Kang Sung-hoon; Kim Do-hoon 752; Kim Do-hoon 753; Kim Kyung-tae	India; Gaganjeet Bhullar; Joseph Chakola; Chiragh Kumar; Anirban Lahiri	Chinese Taipei; Chan Shih-chang; Chiang Chen-chih; Pan Cheng-tsung; Pan Fu-chiang
Women's individual	Ryu So-yeon; South Korea	Mika Miyazato; Japan	Choi He-yong; South Korea
Women's team	South Korea; Choi He-yong; Chung Jae-eun; Ryu So-yeon	Japan; Erina Hara; Mika Miyazato; Miki Saiki	Chinese Taipei; Lu Kwan-chih; Tseng Ya-ni; Yu Pei-lin

== Medal table ==
Rank	Nation	Gold	Silver	Bronze	Total
1	South Korea	4	0	1	5
2	Japan	0	2	0	2
3	Chinese Taipei	0	1	2	3
4	India	0	1	0	1
5	Philippines	0	0	1	1
Totals (5 entries)		4	4	4	12

== Participating nations ==
A total of 93 athletes from 18 nations competed in golf at the 2006 Asian Games:

- Bahrain (4)
- Bangladesh (1)
- China (7)
- Chinese Taipei (7)
- India (7)
- Japan (7)
- Lebanon (6)
- Macau (4)
- Malaysia (4)
- Nepal (4)
- Pakistan (4)
- Philippines (7)
- Qatar (5)
- Singapore (4)
- South Korea (7)
- Sri Lanka (4)
- Thailand (7)
- Vietnam (4)
