= Benyapa Niphatsophon =

Thai professional golfer

Personal information
- Nickname: Gift
- Nationality: Thailand
- Born: 26 June 1997 (age 29)
- Height: 172 cm (5 ft 8 in)

Career
- Sport: Golf
- Turned professional: 2015
- Current tour: Thai LPGA Tour
- Former tours: LPGA Tour; Epson Tour; Ladies European Tour
- Professional wins: 2

Best results in LPGA major championships
- Chevron Championship: DNP
- Women's PGA C'ship: CUT: 2016, 2018
- U.S. Women's Open: DNP
- Women's British Open: DNP
- Evian Championship: T61: 2018

Achievements and awards
- Symetra Tour Player of the Year: 2017
Medal record
Women's golf
Representing Thailand
Asian Games
Gold medal – first place	2014 Incheon	Team
SEA Games
Gold medal – first place	2015 Singapore	Team
Bronze medal – third place	2013 Myanmar	Team

Benyapa Niphatsophon (Thai: เบญญาภา นิภัทร์โสภณ; born 26 June 1997) is a Thai professional golfer playing on the Ladies European Tour. As an amateur, she won a gold medal at the 2014 Asian Games in the women's team event with Budsabakorn Sukapan and Supamas Sangchan.

== Amateur career ==
Niphatsophon competed at the 2014 Asian Games in Incheon and won the first ever gold medal in golf for Thailand in the women's team event with Budsabakorn Sukapan and Supamas Sangchan.

== Professional career ==
Niphatsophon turned professional in 2015. In December 2015, she finished tied for 19th place at the final stage LPGA Qualifying Tournament to earn LPGA Membership for the 2016 season. On the 2016 LPGA Tour, she played 18 events and made eight cuts.

In 2017, Niphatsophon mainly played in the Symetra Tour. She finished second in five tournaments and was on the top of the money list at the end of the season. Her total Symetra Tour career prize money was $124,492 which made her become the third player in Symetra Tour history to surpass $100,000 in a single-season earnings. Niphatsophon was named 2017 Symetra Tour Player of the Year and secured the LPGA Tour card for the 2018 season.

In 2018, Niphatsophon played in 22 LPGA Tour events and made 10 cuts. She recorded her best LPGA Tour finish at the Cambia Portland Classic with a tied for sixth place. She missed most of the 2019 LPGA Tour season with a wrist injury.

== Amateur wins ==
- 2011 Truevisions International Junior, Enjoy Jakarta World Junior Class B, TGA-CAT Junior Ranking 2
- 2012 TrueVisions International Junior, Seletar Junior Open, Callaway Junior World Championship, Thailand Amateur Open, Albatross International Junior Girls Championship
- 2013 TGA-CAT Junior Championship (Asia Pacific), Seletar Junior Open, Santi Cup
- 2014 Bishops Gate Golf Academy Junior Classic

== Professional wins (3) ==
=== All Thailand Golf Tour wins (2) ===
- 2014 Singha Classic (as an amateur)
- 2015 Singha Masters (as an amateur)

=== Thai LPGA Tour wins (1) ===
- 2014 Singha-SAT Thai LPGA Championship (as an amateur)

== Results in LPGA majors ==
Results not in chronological order

Tournament	2016	2017	2018
ANA Inspiration			
U.S. Women's Open			
Women's PGA Championship	CUT		CUT
The Evian Championship			T61
Women's British Open			

Did not play

CUT = missed the half-way cut
"T" = tied

== Team appearances ==
Amateur

- Queen Sirikit Cup (representing Thailand): 2013
