= Golf at the 2010 Asian Games =

- Venue: Dragon Lake Golf Club
- Dates: 17–20 November 2010
- Competitors: 107 from 20 nations

Golf at the 2010 Asian Games was held in Dragon Lake Golf Club, Guangzhou, China from November 17 to 20, 2010. Four competitions were held in both, men and women's.

== Medalists ==
Event	Gold	Silver	Bronze
Men's individual	Kim Meen-whee; South Korea	Miguel Tabuena; Philippines	Hung Chien-yao; Chinese Taipei
Men's team	South Korea; Kim Meen-whee; Lee Jae-hyeok; Lee Kyoung-hoon; Park Il-hwan	India; Rahul Bajaj; Abhijit Singh Chadha; Rashid Khan; Abhinav Lohan	Chinese Taipei; Hsieh Chi-hsien; Huang Tao; Hung Chien-yao; Yang Fei-hao
Women's individual	Kim Hyun-soo; South Korea	Yan Jing; China	Kim Ji-hee; South Korea
Women's team	South Korea; Han Jung-eun; Kim Hyun-soo; Kim Ji-hee	China; Li Jiayun; Lin Xiyu; Yan Jing	Chinese Taipei; Hsu Ke-hui; Liu Yi-chen; Yao Hsuan-yu

== Medal table ==
Rank	Nation	Gold	Silver	Bronze	Total
1	South Korea	4	0	1	5
2	China	0	2	0	2
3	India	0	1	0	1
3	Philippines	0	1	0	1
5	Chinese Taipei	0	0	3	3
Totals (5 entries)		4	4	4	12

== Participating nations ==
A total of 107 athletes from 20 nations competed in golf at the 2010 Asian Games:

- Afghanistan (2)
- Bangladesh (4)
- China (7)
- Chinese Taipei (7)
- Hong Kong (7)
- India (7)
- Japan (7)
- Lebanon (4)
- Macau (5)
- Malaysia (7)
- Mongolia (4)
- Nepal (4)
- Philippines (7)
- Qatar (4)
- Saudi Arabia (4)
- Singapore (4)
- South Korea (7)
- Sri Lanka (4)
- Thailand (6)
- Vietnam (6)
