= Golf at the 1998 Asian Games =

- Venue: Alpine Golf and Sports Club
- Dates: 10–13 December 1998

Golf was one of the many sports which was held at the 1998 Asian Games in Alpine Golf and Sports Club, Pathum Thani Province, Thailand between 10 and 13 December 1998.

Golf featured four events: the men's individual and team events and women's individual and team events.

== Medalists ==
Event	Gold	Silver	Bronze
Men's individual	Tomohiro Kondo; Japan	Gerald Rosales; Philippines	Hidemasa Hoshino; Japan
Men's team	Japan; Hidemasa Hoshino; Tomohiro Kondo; Yusaku Miyazato; Hideto Tanihara	Philippines; Cookie La'O; Rhey Luna; Angelo Que; Gerald Rosales	Chinese Taipei; Chan Yih-shin; Hong Chai-yuh; Lee Cho-chuan; Su Chin-jung
Women's individual	Lu Hsiao-chuan; Chinese Taipei	Wei Yun-jye; Chinese Taipei	Jang Jeong; South Korea
Women's team	Chinese Taipei; Lin Yu-ping; Lu Hsiao-chuan; Wei Yun-jye	South Korea; Cho Kyung-hee; Jang Jeong; Kim Ju-yun	Philippines; Dorothy Delasin; Ria Quiazon; Jennifer Rosales

== Medal table ==
Rank	Nation	Gold	Silver	Bronze	Total
1	Chinese Taipei (TPE)	2	1	1	4
2	Japan (JPN)	2	0	1	3
3	Philippines (PHI)	0	2	1	3
4	South Korea (KOR)	0	1	1	2
Totals (4 entries)		4	4	4	12
