= RCGC =

RCGC may refer to:

- Rowan College at Gloucester County, located in Sewell, New Jersey, United States
- Royal Calcutta Golf Club, the oldest golf club in India and the first outside Great Britain
- Royal Canberra Golf Club, a golf club in Yarralumla, Australian Capital Territory
