= Shubhankar Sharma =

Indian professional golfer (born 1996)

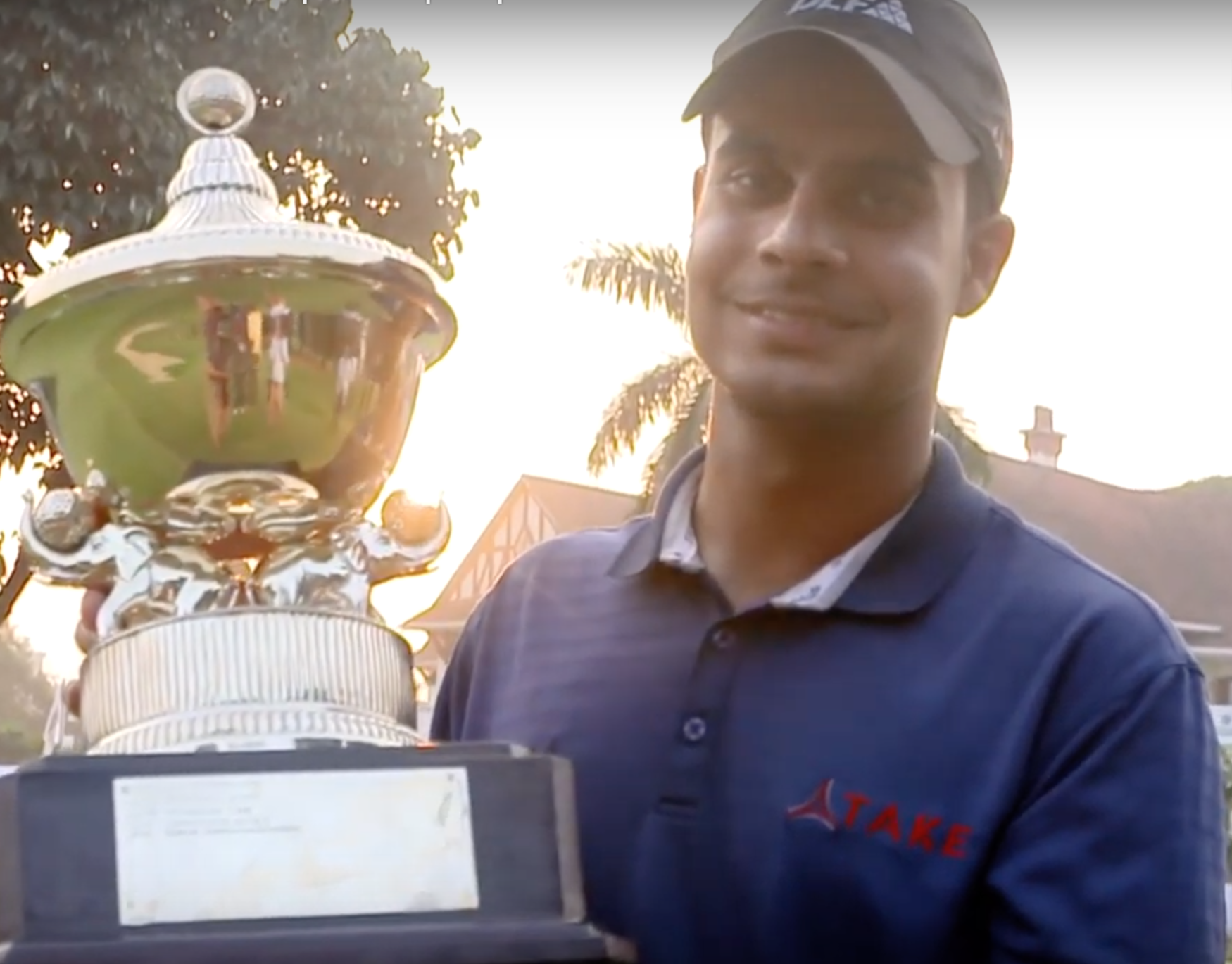
- Sharma after winning the Professional Golf Tour of India's 2017 McLeod Russel Tour Championship

Personal information
- Nationality: India
- Born: 21 July 1996 (age 30) Jhansi, India

Career
- Sport: Golf
- Turned professional: 2013
- Current tours: Asian Tour; European Tour
- Former tour: Professional Golf Tour of India
- Professional wins: 10
- Highest ranking: 64 (11 March 2018)

Number of wins by tour
- European Tour: 2
- Asian Tour: 2
- Sunshine Tour: 1
- Other: 8

Best results in major championships
- Masters Tournament: CUT: 2018
- PGA Championship: CUT: 2018
- U.S. Open: CUT: 2018
- The Open Championship: T8: 2023

Achievements and awards
- Sir Henry Cotton Rookie of the Year: 2018
- Asian Tour Order of Merit winner: 2018

Shubhankar Sharma (born 21 July 1996) is an Indian professional golfer. In December 2017, he recorded his first tour win in the Joburg Open and followed this with a second win at the Maybank Championship in February 2018. He studied at Bal Bhawan School, Bhopal.

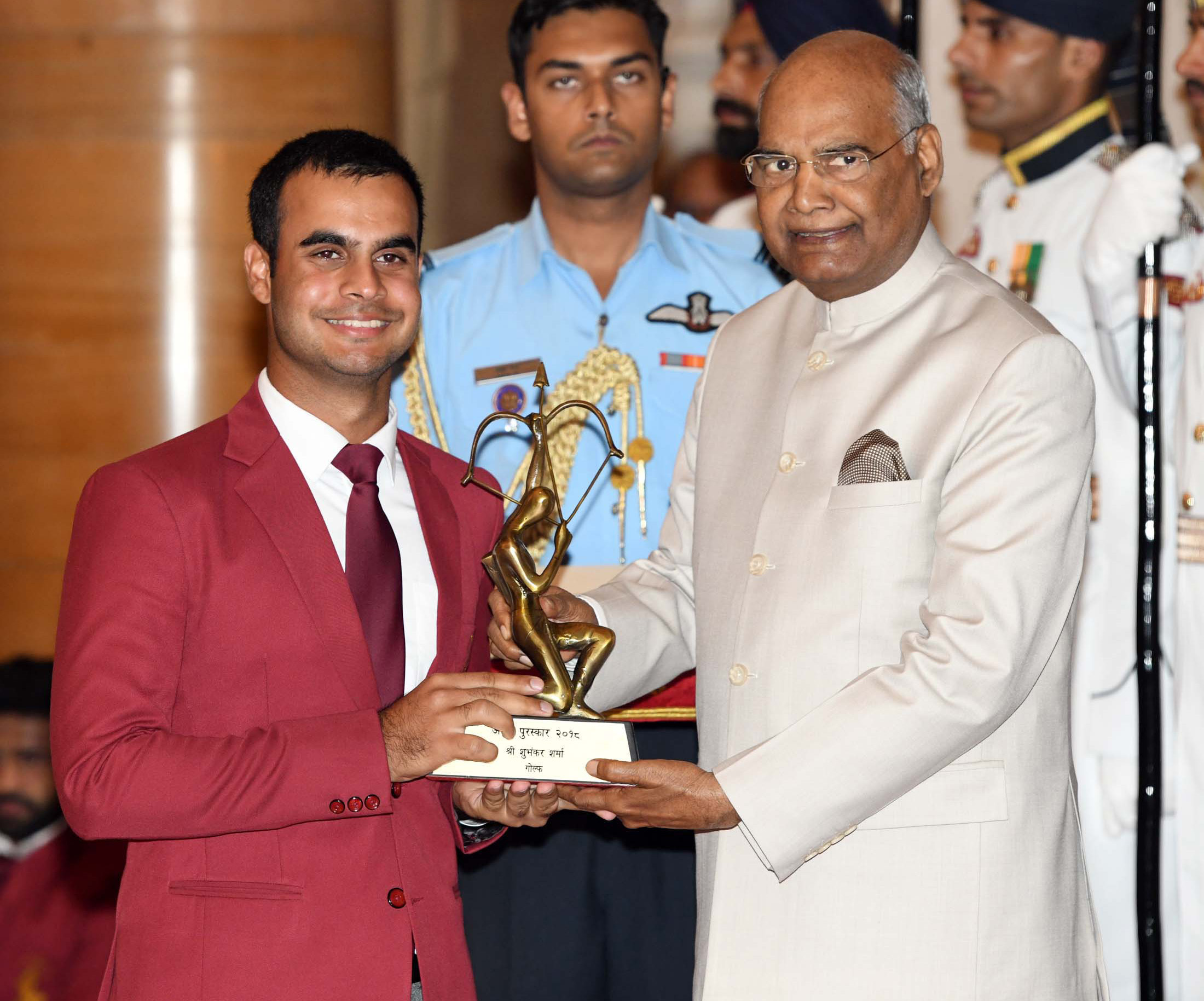
The President, Ram Nath Kovind, presenting the Arjuna Award to Sharma at the Rashtrapati Bhavan, on 25 September 2018.

== Professional career ==
Turning professional in 2013, Sharma played on the Asian Development Tour in 2014. He also finished fourth in the Panasonic Open India, a 2014 Asian Tour event.

From 2015 to 2017, Sharma played primarily on the Asian Tour. He played in the TAKE Solutions India Masters on the 2015 Asian Development Tour, losing in a playoff to S. Chikkarangappa. The following week he was fourth in the Panasonic Open India on the Asian Tour. In 2016, Sharma finished third in the Bashundhara Bangladesh Open and tied for fourth in the Resorts World Manila Masters and finished 51st in the Order of Merit.

Sharma started 2017 finishing fourth in the Bashundhara Bangladesh Open and in the top 10 in the Maybank Championship, an event co-sanctioned with the European Tour. After these two events in February it was not until November that he showed a return to form with a top-10 finish in the UBS Hong Kong Open, another event co-sanctioned with the European Tour.

Two weeks later he came to more notice in the Joburg Open where a second round of 61, followed by a 65, gave him a five-stroke lead at the start of the last round. The final round was delayed by bad weather but Sharma finished with a 69 for a three-stroke win over Erik van Rooyen. The event was part of the Open Qualifying Series and the win gave him an entry to the 2018 Open Championship. The win also earned him full membership of the European Tour.

Sharma had a final round 62 to win the Maybank Championship in February 2018, an event co-sanctioned by the Asian Tour and the European Tour, two ahead of Jorge Campillo. The win lifted him into the world top-100 for the first time. He also took an early lead in the European Tour's Race to Dubai, earning a place in the 2018 WGC-Mexico Championship in March. At the WGC-Mexico Championship Sharma held the lead after the second and third rounds. However, he faltered with a final-round 74 and finished the tournament in a tie for ninth place. It was his first start in a PGA Tour event. Two days after the tournament he received an invitation to play in the Masters Tournament, his first major championship appearance and the fourth Indian to play in the Masters, Jeev Milkha Singh, Arjun Atwal and Anirban Lahiri were the previous three to play.

== Personal life ==
Sharma is a strict vegetarian for ethical and religious reasons, who has stated that he has never consumed meat in his life. He is also allergic to gluten.

== Professional wins (10) ==
=== European Tour wins (2) ===
No.	Date	Tournament	Winning score	Margin of victory	Runner-up
1	11 Dec 2017 (2018 season)	Joburg Open^{1,2}	−23 (69-61-65-69=264)	3 strokes	(South Africa) Erik van Rooyen
2	4 Feb 2018	Maybank Championship^{2}	−21 (70-69-66-62=267)	2 strokes	(Spain) Jorge Campillo

^{1}Co-sanctioned by the Sunshine Tour
^{2}Co-sanctioned by the Asian Tour

=== Asian Tour wins (2) ===
No.	Date	Tournament	Winning score	Margin of victory	Runner-up
1	11 Dec 2017	Joburg Open^{1,2}	−23 (69-61-65-69=264)	3 strokes	(South Africa) Erik van Rooyen
2	4 Feb 2018	Maybank Championship^{2}	−21 (70-69-66-62=267)	2 strokes	(Spain) Jorge Campillo

^{1}Co-sanctioned by the Sunshine Tour
^{2}Co-sanctioned by the European Tour

=== Professional Golf Tour of India wins (8) ===
No.	Date	Tournament	Winning score	Margin of victory	Runner(s)-up
1	12 Apr 2014	Cochin Masters	−9 (33-37-33-32=135)	2 strokes	(India) Rashid Khan, (India) Sanjay Kumar
2	19 Feb 2016	PGTI Players Championship (Eagleton)	−24 (65-70-64-65=264)	6 strokes	(Sri Lanka) Anura Rohana
3	25 Mar 2016	Kolkata Classic	−9 (68-72-71-68=279)	1 stroke	(India) Shankar Das, (India) Khalin Joshi
4	18 Dec 2016	Tata Open	−20 (64-63-70-67=264)	1 stroke	(India) Rashid Khan
5	15 Oct 2017	TAKE Open Golf Championship	−12 (68-70-71-67=276)	2 strokes	(India) Aman Raj
6	24 Dec 2017	McLeod Russel Tour Championship	−17 (66-70-67-68=271)	1 stroke	(India) Rashid Khan
7	17 Apr 2026	Boulders Classic	−25 (66-66-64-67=263)	8 strokes	(India) Mohd Azhar, (India) Angad Cheema, (India) Rashid Khan
8	10 Oct 2026	Kapil Dev Invitational Tour Championship (2)	−14 (68-65-72-69=274)	6 strokes	(Italy) Michele Ortolani, (India) Manoj S.

== Results in major championships ==
Results not in chronological order before 2019 and in 2020.

Tournament	2018	2019	2020	2021	2022	2023	2024
Masters Tournament	CUT						
PGA Championship	CUT						
U.S. Open	CUT						
The Open Championship	T51	T51	NT			T8	T19

Top 10
Did not play

CUT = missed the half-way cut
"T" = tied
NT = No tournament due to the COVID-19 pandemic

== Results in World Golf Championships ==
Tournament	2018	2019
Championship	T9	T60
Match Play	T59	
Invitational	T69	
Champions	T69	

Top 10
Did not play

QF, R16, R32, R64 = Round in which player lost in match play
"T" = Tied

== See also ==
- 2025 European Tour Qualifying School graduates
