= 2017 Asian Tour =

Golf tour season

2017 Asian Tour season
- Duration: 19 January 2017 – 17 December 2017
- Number of official events: 27 (Note: One further tournament was scheduled but was postponed.)
- Most wins: (India) Shiv Kapur (2)
- Order of Merit: (Malaysia) Gavin Green
- Players' Player of the Year: (Malaysia) Gavin Green
- Rookie of the Year: (United States) Micah Lauren Shin

The 2017 Asian Tour is the 23rd season of the modern Asian Tour (formerly the Asian PGA Tour), the main professional golf tour in Asia (outside of Japan) since it was established in 1995.

== Schedule ==
The following table lists official events during the 2017 season.

Date	Tournament	Host country	Purse (US$)	Winner (Note: The number in brackets after each winner's name is the number of Asian Tour events they had won up to and including that tournament. This information is only shown for Asian Tour members.)	OWGR points	Other tours (Note: AFR − Sunshine Tour; ANZ − PGA Tour of Australasia; CHN − China Tour; EUR − European Tour; JPN − Japan Golf Tour; KOR − Korean Tour; PGAT − PGA Tour; PGTI − Professional Golf Tour of India; TWN − Taiwan PGA Tour.)	Notes
22 Jan	SMBC Singapore Open	Singapore	1,000,000	(Thailand) Prayad Marksaeng (10)	26	JPN	
29 Jan	Leopalace21 Myanmar Open	Myanmar	750,000	(Australia) Todd Sinnott (1)	19	JPN	
4 Feb	Bashundhara Bangladesh Open	Bangladesh	300,000	(Thailand) Jazz Janewattananond (1)	14		
12 Feb	Maybank Championship	Malaysia	3,000,000	(Paraguay) Fabrizio Zanotti (n/a)	36	EUR	
19 Feb	ISPS Handa World Super 6 Perth	Australia	A$1,750,000	(Australia) Brett Rumford (n/a)	23	ANZ, EUR	
12 Mar	Hero Indian Open	India	1,750,000	(India) Shiv Chawrasia (6)	21	EUR	
~~16 Apr~~	Ho Tram Players Championship	Vietnam	–	Postponed	–		
23 Apr	Panasonic Open Golf Championship	Japan	¥150,000,000	(Japan) Kenichi Kuboya (n/a)	15		
30 Apr	Yeangder Heritage	Taiwan	300,000	(India) Shiv Kapur (2)	14	TWN	New tournament
21 May	Thailand Open	Thailand	300,000	(Thailand) Rattanon Wannasrichan (1)	14		
18 Jun	Queen's Cup	Thailand	500,000	(Malaysia) Nicholas Fung (1)	14		
6 Aug	TAKE Solutions Masters	India	300,000	(Thailand) Poom Saksansin (2)	14	PGTI	New to Asian Tour
20 Aug	Fiji International	Fiji	A$1,500,000	(Australia) Jason Norris (n/a)	15	ANZ, EUR	New to Asian Tour
10 Sep	Omega European Masters	Switzerland	€2,700,000	(England) Matt Fitzpatrick (n/a)	32	EUR	
17 Sep	Shinhan Donghae Open	South Korea	₩1,200,000,000	(Canada) Richard T. Lee (2)	12	KOR	
24 Sep	Asia-Pacific Diamond Cup Golf	Japan	¥150,000,000	(Japan) Daisuke Kataoka (1)	15	JPN	
1 Oct	Mercuries Taiwan Masters	Taiwan	800,000	(Malaysia) Gavin Green (1)	14	TWN	
8 Oct	Yeangder Tournament Players Championship	Taiwan	500,000	(India) Ajeetesh Sandhu (1)	14	TWN	
15 Oct	CIMB Classic	Malaysia	7,000,000	(United States) Pat Perez (n/a)	48	PGAT	Limited-field event
22 Oct	Macao Open	Macau	500,000	(India) Gaganjeet Bhullar (8)	14		
29 Oct	Indonesia Open	Indonesia	300,000	(Thailand) Panuphol Pittayarat (1)	14		
5 Nov	Panasonic Open India	India	400,000	(India) Shiv Kapur (3)	14	PGTI	
12 Nov	Resorts World Manila Masters	Philippines	1,000,000	(United States) Micah Lauren Shin (1)	14		
26 Nov	UBS Hong Kong Open	Hong Kong	2,000,000	(Australia) Wade Ormsby (2)	34	EUR	
3 Dec	AfrAsia Bank Mauritius Open	Mauritius	€1,000,000	(South Africa) Dylan Frittelli (n/a)	17	AFR, EUR	
3 Dec	KG S&H City Asian Golf Championship	China	350,000	(China) Xiao Bowen (1)	14	CHN	New tournament
11 Dec	Joburg Open	South Africa	R16,500,000	(India) Shubhankar Sharma (1)	17	AFR, EUR	New to Asian Tour
17 Dec	Indonesian Masters	Indonesia	750,000	(England) Justin Rose (n/a)	24		Flagship event

=== Unofficial events ===
The following events were sanctioned by the Asian Tour, but did not carry official money, nor were wins official.

Date	Tournament	Host country	Purse ($)	Winner	OWGR points	Notes
31 Dec	Royal Cup	Thailand	500,000	(India) Shiv Kapur	n/a	Limited-field event

== Order of Merit ==
The Order of Merit was based on prize money won during the season, calculated in U.S. dollars. The leading player on the Order of Merit earned status to play on the 2018 European Tour.

Position	Player	Prize money ($)	Status earned
1	(Malaysia) Gavin Green	585,814	Promoted to European Tour
2	(United States) David Lipsky	461,179	Already exempt (Note: Lipsky and Hend were already exempt due to finishing inside the Top 101 of the 2017 Race to Dubai.)
3	(Thailand) Phachara Khongwatmai	447,299	Already exempt (Note: Khongwatmai was already exempt due to finishing inside the Top 10 of the 2017 European Tour Access List.)
4	(Australia) Scott Hend	443,205	Already exempt
5	(India) Shiv Chawrasia	440,748	Already exempt (Note: Chawrasia was already exempt due to being a tournament winner on the 2017 European Tour.)

== Awards ==
Award	Winner	Ref.
Players' Player of the Year	(Malaysia) Gavin Green	
Rookie of the Year	(United States) Micah Lauren Shin	

== See also ==
- 2017 Asian Development Tour
