= Tomb of Syed Abid =

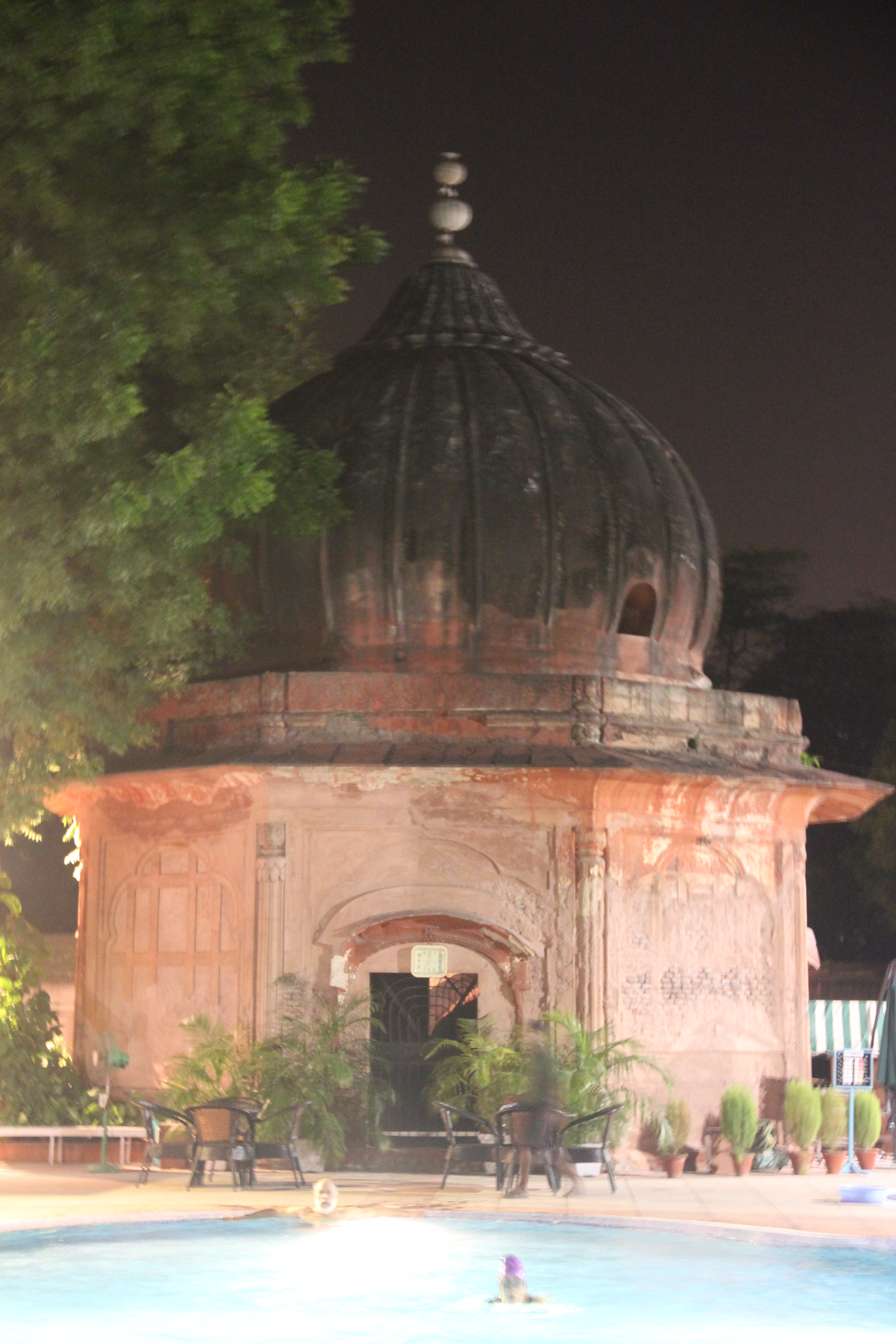
- Interactive map of the Tomb of Syed Abid area

General information
- Location: Delhi Golf Club complex
- Coordinates: 28°36′01″N 77°14′14″E

The Tomb of Syed Abid is located on the grounds of the Delhi Golf Club complex, near Lal Bangla. The tomb was built in 1036 AH (c. 1626 CE). Sir Syed Ahmed Khan's seminal work on the monuments of Delhi, Aasar Us Sanaadeed mentions Syed Abid as an associate of Khan Dauran Khan, one of Shahjahan's leading soldiers.

== The Tomb as described in Aasar Us Sanaadeed ==
"Syed Abid Nawab Khan Dauran Khan ke rafiquon mein they. Kisi larai mein maarey gaye. Jab yah maqbara takhmeenan 1036 Hijri mutaabiq 1626 'eesavi key bana. Lal Bangla jo makaan mashhoor hai uskey paas yah maqbara hai. Saakht iski bilkul chooney aur eent kee hai. Aur kahin kahin cheenikaari ka bhi kaam hai. Yah makan bhi achha bana hua hai. Iske sahan mein hauz thaa charon taraf nahrein theen. Magar ab kharaab ho gayi hain. Darwaza bhi iska khush qata'a bana hua hai. Aur us par aik sah-dari ma'aqool hai."—Aasar Us Sanaadeed, 2nd edition. By Sir Syed Ahmad Khan

"Syed Abid was an associate of Nawab Khan Dauran Khan. He was killed in some battle. It was then that the tomb was built in 1036 Hijri (corresponding to 1626 CE). This tomb is situated near that building famed as Lal Bangla. The tomb is constructed entirely of lime-based cement and bricks, with occasional patches of tile-work. The construction is sound. There was a water tank in its court-yard. It was crisscrossed by runnels. But they are in a state of disrepair now. Its gateway too is of a pleasing form. Upon it is a becoming sah-dari (lit. with three doors, a pavilion)." -Teehee
