= Indian Open (golf) =

Golf tournament

Coordinates: 28.455°N 77.106°E

Hero Indian Open

Tournament information
- Location: New Delhi, India
- Established: 1964
- Course: DLF Golf and Country Club
- Par: 72
- Length: 7,416 yards (6,781 m)
- Tours: European Tour; Asian Tour; Asia Golf Circuit; Professional Golf Tour of India
- Format: Stroke play
- Prize fund: US$2,250,000
- Month played: March

Tournament record score
- Aggregate: 268 David Gleeson (2011)
- To par: −20 as above

Current champion
- (England) Alex Fitzpatrick

Final champion
- Location in India Location in Haryana

The Indian Open, titled for sponsorship reasons as the Hero Indian Open since 2011, is the national open golf championship of India, organised by the Indian Golf Union. Founded in 1964, it was added to the Asia Golf Circuit schedule in 1970. In 1998 it became an event on the rival Omega Tour (known as the Asian Tour since 2004). Since 2015, it has also been co-sanctioned by the European Tour.

From 1964 until 2000, the tournament was held exclusively at either Delhi Golf Club or Royal Calcutta Golf Club. Since then it has been held at Classic Golf Resort in 2000 and 2001, Karnataka Golf Association in 2012, and DLF Golf and Country Club in 2009 and since 2017; all other editions have been held at Delhi Golf Club.

== History ==
The inaugural event was held in February 1964. Peter Thomson beat Ralph Moffitt by four strokes. Thomson was the inspiration behind the event. He used to stop off in India while travelling worldwide to play and soon realised the potential for golf and that the best way to promote it would be an international tournament. It was this insight that persuaded the Indian Golf Union to establish the Indian Open. Thompson continued to play in the event and won again in 1966 and 1976. His three wins was equalled by Jyoti Randhawa in 2007.

The second event in 1965 was won by Indian amateur Prem Gopal (Billoo) Sethi, who beat Guy Wolstenholme by seven strokes. Sethi still remains the only amateur winner. It was not until 1991, when Ali Sher became champion, that India had another winner.

In 1970 the Indian Open became part of the Asia Golf Circuit; it had been an "associate event" on the circuit in 1967 and 1968. As a result of joining the tour, the field increased in strength with notable winners including three-time major champion Payne Stewart.

There have been a number of sponsors over the years, with Hero Honda Motors Ltd taking over sponsorship in 2005. The prize fund for 2017 was US$1.75 million.

No events took place in 2020, 2021 and 2022 because of the COVID-19 pandemic.

== Venues ==
The following venues have been used since the founding of the Indian Open in 1964.

Venue	Location	First	Last	Times
Delhi Golf Club	Delhi	1964	2016	30
Royal Calcutta Golf Club	Kolkata	1965	1999	19
Classic Golf Resort	Delhi	2000	2001	2
DLF Golf and Country Club	Gurgaon	2009	2025	7
Karnataka Golf Association	Karnataka	2012	2012	1

== Winners ==
Year	Tour(s) (Note: AGC/FEC − Asia Golf Circuit/Far East Circuit; ASA − Asian Tour; EUR − European Tour; PGTI − Professional Golf Tour of India.)	Winner	Score	To par	Margin of victory	Runner(s)-up	Venue	Ref.
Hero Indian Open
2026	EUR, PGTI	(England) Alex Fitzpatrick	279	−9	2 strokes	(Spain) Eugenio Chacarra	DLF	
2025	EUR, PGTI	(Spain) Eugenio Chacarra	284	−4	2 strokes	(Japan) Keita Nakajima	DLF	
2024	EUR, PGTI	(Japan) Keita Nakajima	271	−17	4 strokes	(India) Veer Ahlawat (Sweden) Sebastian Söderberg (United States) Johannes Veerman	DLF	
2023	EUR, PGTI	(Germany) Marcel Siem	274	−14	1 stroke	(Germany) Yannik Paul	DLF	
2022	EUR	Cancelled due to the COVID-19 pandemic						
2021	ASA, EUR	Cancelled due to the COVID-19 pandemic						
2020	ASA, EUR	Cancelled due to the COVID-19 pandemic						
2019	ASA, EUR	(Scotland) Stephen Gallacher	279	−9	1 stroke	(Japan) Masahiro Kawamura	DLF	
2018	ASA, EUR	(England) Matt Wallace	277	−11	Playoff (Note: Wallace won with a birdie on the first hole of a sudden-death playoff.)	(England) Andrew Johnston	DLF	
2017	ASA, EUR	(India) Shiv Chawrasia (2)	278	−10	7 strokes	(Malaysia) Gavin Green	DLF	
2016	ASA, EUR	(India) Shiv Chawrasia	273	−15	2 strokes	(India) Anirban Lahiri (South Korea) Wang Jeung-hun	Delhi	
2015	ASA, EUR	(India) Anirban Lahiri	277	−7	Playoff (Note: Lahiri won with a birdie on the first hole of a sudden-death playoff.)	(India) Shiv Chawrasia	Delhi	
2014: No tournament due to scheduling changes (November to February)								
2013	ASA	(Bangladesh) Siddikur Rahman	274	−14	1 stroke	(India) Anirban Lahiri (India) Shiv Chawrasia	Delhi	
2012	ASA	(Thailand) Thaworn Wiratchant (2)	270	−14	Playoff (Note: Wiratchant won with a bogey on the first hole of a sudden-death playoff.)	(Scotland) Richie Ramsay	Karnataka	
2011	ASA	(Australia) David Gleeson	268	−20	3 strokes	(India) Chiragh Kumar	Delhi	
Hero Honda Indian Open
2010	ASA	(Sweden) Rikard Karlberg	277	−11	2 strokes	(South Korea) Baek Seuk-hyun	Delhi	
2009	ASA	(India) Chinnaswamy Muniyappa	276	−12	Playoff (Note: Muniyappa won with a birdie on the first hole of a sudden-death playoff.)	(South Korea) Lee Sung	DLF	
2008	ASA	(China) Liang Wenchong	272	−16	1 stroke	(Australia) Darren Beck	Delhi	
2007	ASA	(India) Jyoti Randhawa (3)	275	−13	3 strokes	(Taiwan) Chang Tse-peng	Delhi	
2006	ASA	(India) Jyoti Randhawa (2)	270	−18	Playoff (Note: Randhawa won with a birdie on second hole of a sudden-death playoff; Kumar was eliminated on the first extra hole.)	(India) Shiv Chawrasia (India) Vijay Kumar	Delhi	
2005	ASA	(Thailand) Thaworn Wiratchant	272	−16	2 strokes	(India) Gaurav Ghei	Delhi	
Royal Challenge Indian Open
2004	ASA	(Singapore) Mardan Mamat	270	−18	5 strokes	(Mexico) Pablo del Olmo	Delhi	
2003	ASA	(United States) Mike Cunning	270	−18	5 strokes	(Canada) Rick Gibson	Delhi	
2002	ASA	(India) Vijay Kumar	275	−13	2 strokes	(Canada) Rick Gibson	Delhi	
Wills Indian Open
2001	ASA	(Thailand) Thongchai Jaidee	271	−17	1 stroke	(Scotland) Ross Bain	Classic	
2000	ASA	(India) Jyoti Randhawa	273	−15	Playoff (Note: Randhawa won with a par on the second hole of a sudden-death playoff.)	(South Africa) Sammy Daniels	Classic	
1999	ASA	(India) Arjun Atwal	276	−12	4 strokes	(India) Shiv Chawrasia (South Korea) Kang Wook-soon (Thailand) Prayad Marksaeng	Royal Calcutta	
Classic Indian Open
1998	ASA	(India) Feroz Ali Mollah	274	−14	5 strokes	(United States) Dean Wilson	Royal Calcutta	
1997	AGC	(England) Ed Fryatt	272	−16	6 strokes	(United States) Gary Rusnak	Royal Calcutta	
1996	AGC	(Japan) Hidezumi Shirakata	277	−11	3 strokes	(India) Basad Ali (Sweden) Daniel Chopra (India) Jyoti Randhawa	Royal Calcutta	
1995	AGC	(Canada) Jim Rutledge	280	−8	4 strokes	(Sweden) Daniel Chopra (United States) Bob May	Delhi	
1994	AGC	(United States) Emlyn Aubrey	285	−3	1 stroke	(United States) Brandt Jobe	Royal Calcutta	
Wills Indian Open
1993	AGC	(India) Ali Sher (2)	288	E	1 stroke	(India) Feroz Ali Mollah	Delhi	
1992	AGC	(Australia) Stewart Ginn	284	−4	2 strokes	(United States) Aaron Meeks	Royal Calcutta	
1991	AGC	(India) Ali Sher	283	−5	1 stroke	(United States) Todd Hamilton (Taiwan) Wang Ter-chang	Delhi	
1990	AGC	(United States) Andrew Debusk	288	−4	6 strokes	(Mexico) Carlos Espinosa	Royal Calcutta	
1989	AGC	(Canada) Rémi Bouchard	279	−9	1 stroke	(Mexico) Carlos Espinosa	Delhi	
Charminar Challenge Indian Open
1988	AGC	(Taiwan) Lu Chien-soon	281	−11	5 strokes	(United States) Kirk Triplett	Royal Calcutta	
1987	AGC	(United States) Brian Tennyson	280	−8	3 strokes	(United States) Mike Cunning (United States) Jim Hallet	Delhi	
1986	AGC	(Taiwan) Lu Hsi-chuen	279	−13	2 strokes	(Taiwan) Lu Chien-soon	Royal Calcutta	
Indian Open
1985	AGC	(Canada) Tony Grimes	279	−9	4 strokes	(Australia) Rodger Davis	Delhi	
1984	AGC	(Mexico) Rafael Alarcón	279	−13	3 strokes	(United States) Richard Cromwell (Taiwan) Lai Chung-jen	Royal Calcutta	
1983	AGC	(Japan) Junichi Takahashi	285	−3	Playoff (Note: Takahashi won with a birdie on the second hole of a sudden-death playoff; all three players made par on the first extra hole.)	(Taiwan) Hsieh Yu-shu (United States) Bob Tway	Delhi	
1982	AGC	(Taiwan) Hsu Sheng-san	277	−15	3 strokes	(Japan) Ikuo Shirahama	Royal Calcutta	
1981	AGC	(United States) Payne Stewart	284	−4	4 strokes	(Taiwan) Ho Ming-chung (Taiwan) Hsu Sheng-san	Delhi	
1980	AGC	(United States) Kurt Cox	286	−6	4 strokes	(Myanmar) Mya Aye (Taiwan) Liao Kuo-chih	Royal Calcutta	
1979	AGC	(United States) Gaylord Burrows	284	−4	1 stroke	(Taiwan) Hsu Chi-san	Delhi	
1978	AGC	(United States) Bill Brask	284	−8	4 strokes	(Australia) Stewart Ginn (Australia) Brian Jones (Taiwan) Kuo Chie-Hsiung	Royal Calcutta	
1977	AGC	(Australia) Brian Jones (2)	284	−4	1 stroke	(Myanmar) Mya Aye (Japan) Yoshikazu Hayashi (Australia) Peter Thomson	Delhi	
1976	AGC	(Australia) Peter Thomson (3)	288	−4	1 stroke	(Australia) Brian Jones	Royal Calcutta	
1975	AGC	(Australia) Ted Ball	282	−10	Playoff (Note: Ball won with a birdie on the first hole of a sudden-death playoff.)	(Taiwan) Kuo Chie-Hsiung	Delhi	
1974	AGC	(Taiwan) Kuo Chie-Hsiung	287	−5	2 strokes	(Myanmar) Mya Aye (Australia) Brian Jones (United States) Don Klenk	Royal Calcutta	
1973	AGC	(Australia) Graham Marsh (2)	280	−12	3 strokes	(Australia) Stewart Ginn	Delhi	
1972	AGC	(Australia) Brian Jones	282	−10	2 strokes	(Philippines) Ben Arda (Australia) Peter Thomson	Delhi	
1971	AGC	(Australia) Graham Marsh	275	−17	1 stroke	(Australia) David Graham	Delhi	
1970	AGC	(Taiwan) Chen Chien-Chung	279	−13	8 strokes	(Taiwan) Hsieh Min-Nan (Japan) Koichi Ono	Royal Calcutta	
1969	AGC (Note: Between 1967 and 1969 the event was sanctioned by the Asia Golf Circuit, however it was an unofficial money event; therefore the win is considered unofficial on that tour.)	(Philippines) Ben Arda	291	−1	7 strokes	(India) Shadi Lal (India) Raj Kumar Pitamber (a)	Royal Calcutta	
1968	AGC	(Japan) Kenji Hosoishi (2)	285	−7	2 strokes	(Australia) Stan Peach	Delhi	
1967	FEC	(Japan) Kenji Hosoishi	287	−5	Playoff (Note: Hosoishi won on the third hole of a sudden-death playoff.)	(England) Malcolm Gregson	Royal Calcutta	
1966		(Australia) Peter Thomson (2)	284		6 strokes	(India) P. G. Sethi (a) (England) Guy Wolstenholme	Delhi	
1965		(India) P. G. Sethi (a)	282		7 strokes	(England) Guy Wolstenholme	Royal Calcutta	
1964		(Australia) Peter Thomson	292		4 strokes	(England) Ralph Moffitt	Delhi	

== See also ==
- Open golf tournament
