= Udayan Mane =

Indian professional golfer

Personal information
- Nationality: India
- Born: 24 February 1991 (age 35) Bangalore, India

Career
- Sport: Golf
- Turned professional: 2015
- Current tours: Professional Golf Tour of India; Asian Tour
- Professional wins: 12

Achievements and awards
- Professional Golf Tour of India Order of Merit winner: 2020–21

Udayan Mane (born 24 February 1991) is an Indian professional golfer. He currently plays on the Asian Tour and the Professional Golf Tour of India. He has won 12 times on the Professional Golf Tour of India.

== Amateur career ==
Mane was the leading amateur in India in 2014. He represented India in both the 2014 Asian Games and the 2014 Eisenhower Trophy.

== Professional career ==
Mane turned professional in early 2015 and had a successful first season, winning twice on the Professional Golf Tour of India. He had three more wins in 2017 and has a total of 11 wins on the tour. He has also played a number of events on the Asian Tour. His highest finish on the tour was when he was tied for 6th place in the 2018 Bank BRI Indonesia Open.

Mane qualified for the 2020 Summer Olympics in Tokyo, Japan and will represent India in the men's individual event. He was not in the list of qualifiers published on 22 June, after the end of the qualifying period, but got a place when the Argentine Emiliano Grillo later withdrew. With a world ranking of 356 on 21 June, Mane was the highest-ranked eligible replacement. He was the lowest ranked player in the men's event.

== Professional wins (12) ==
=== Professional Golf Tour of India wins (12) ===
No.	Date	Tournament	Winning score	Margin of victory	Runner(s)-up
1	2 Oct 2015	PGTI Players Championship (Rambagh)	−16 (61-69-67-67=264)	1 stroke	(India) Shankar Das
2	23 Oct 2015	Western India Oxford Golf Masters	−19 (65-69-67-68=269)	8 strokes	(India) Abhinav Lohan
3	2 Mar 2017	BTI Open	−12 (70-67-69-70=276)	4 strokes	(India) Harendra Gupta, (India) Khalin Joshi, (India) Aman Raj
4	2 Sep 2017	TAKE Classic	−14 (69-68-72-65=274)	1 stroke	(India) Ajeetesh Sandhu
5	18 Nov 2017	Bengaluru Open Golf Championship	−20 (69-65-66-68=268)	1 stroke	(India) Honey Baisoya
6	25 Feb 2018	Golconda Masters	−14 (67-68-68-67=270)	Playoff	(India) Abhijit Singh Chadha, (India) Shamim Khan, (Sri Lanka) Nadaraja Thangaraja
7	15 Feb 2019	PGTI Players Championship (Classic)	−15 (71-64-71-67=273)	1 stroke	(India) Mukesh Kumar, (India) Shubhankar Sharma
8	29 Dec 2019	Tata Steel Tour Championship	−26 (67-66-64-65=262)	1 stroke	(India) Shiv Chawrasia
9	8 Feb 2020	Golconda Masters	−17 (68-67-65-67=267)	2 strokes	(India) Viraj Madappa, (India) Aman Raj
10	14 Feb 2020	Tata Steel PGTI Players Championship (Eagleton)	−20 (68-67-67-66=268)	Playoff	(India) Veer Ahlawat
11	19 Mar 2021	Delhi-NCR Open	−14 (71-67-67-69=274)	2 strokes	(India) S. Chikkarangappa, (India) Aman Raj, (India) Shivendra Sisodia
12	19 Dec 2021	Tata Steel Tour Championship (2)	−18 (68-66-67-69=270)	1 stroke	(India) Rashid Khan

== Team appearances ==
Amateur

- Eisenhower Trophy (representing India): 2014
- Asian Games (representing India): 2014
