= Aadil Bedi =

Indian professional golfer (born 2001)

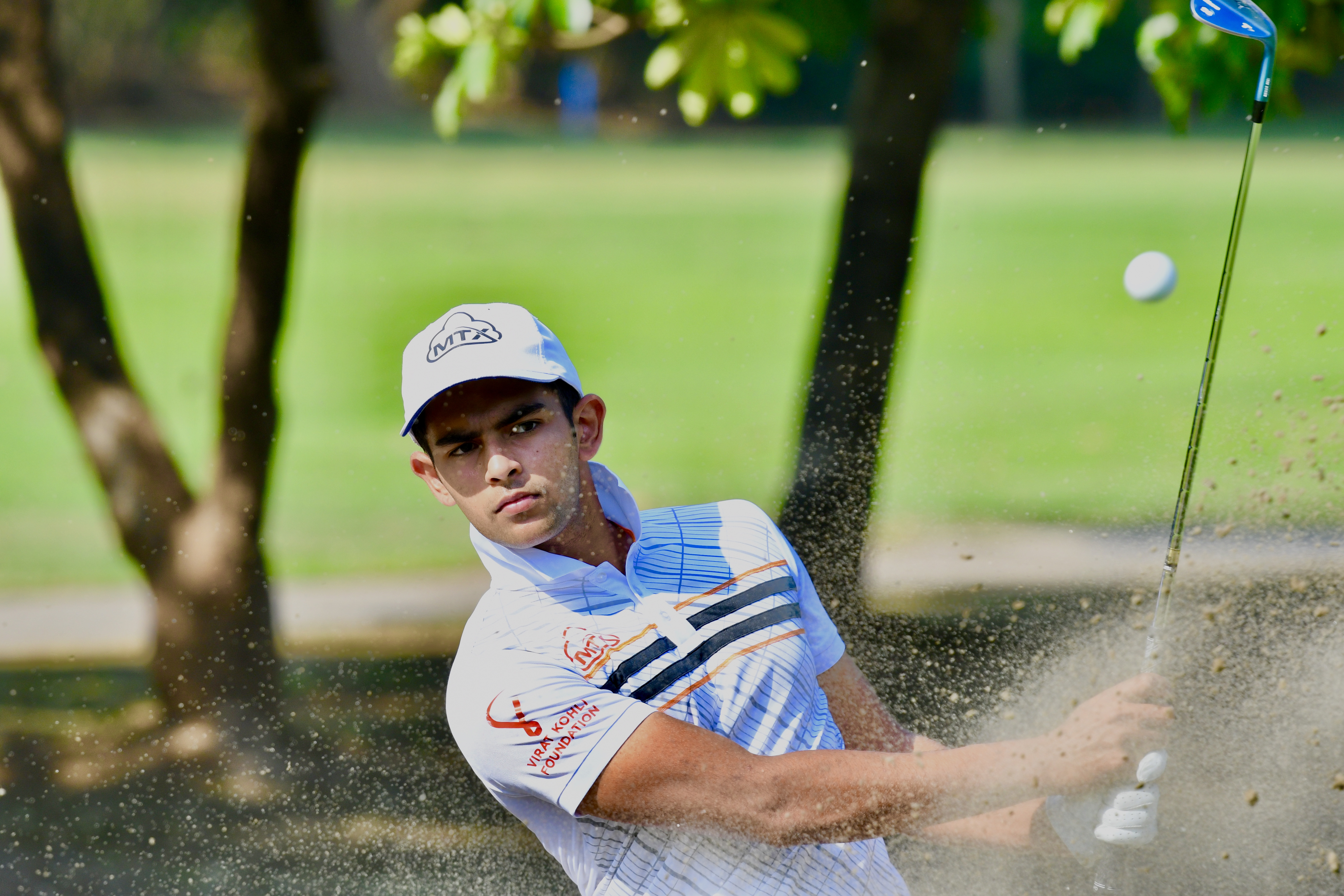

Personal information
- Nationality: India
- Born: 17 February 2001 (age 25) Amritsar, Punjab, India
- Height: 6 ft 1 in (185 cm)

Career
- Sport: Golf
- Turned professional: 2018
- Current tours: Asian Tour; Professional Golf Tour of India
- Professional wins: 1

Aadil Bedi (born 17 February 2001) is an Indian professional golfer who plays on the Asian Tour and the Professional Golf Tour of India. He won the Bengal Open in 2020.

== Background ==
Bedi was born in Amritsar, in the state of Punjab. His father Harinder Pal Singh Bedi and mother Hargunjit Kaur are both officers with the Government of Punjab. Harinder is an avid golfer, and from the age of four, Aadil used to accompany him to play at Chandigarh Golf Club.

Bedi finished his schooling in Chandigarh at Vivek High School. He is currently pursuing a bachelor's degree in kinesiology from Chaffey College in California.

== Amateur career ==
Bedi finished at the top of the Junior Order of Merit standings in the 7–10 age group (2011), and the 11–13 age group (2013). Notably, the latter came on the heels of winning the All India Final at Coimbatore and Bombay in November–December 2013.

As an amateur, Bedi's biggest wins came in 2017 at the SSG-BLR International Amateur Golf Championship in Singapore and the World Star of Junior Golf Championship in Las Vegas, Nevada. He was ranked as the Number 1 amateur golfer in the country by the Indian Golf Union in April/May 2018.

Bedi was also part of the Indian team that represented India at the 2018 Asian Games. In the individual portion of the tournament, he finished T13. The team, which also included Rayhan Thomas, Kshitij Naveed Kaul, and Harimohan Singh, finished seventh overall. Thomas, Kaul and Bedi were also part of the Indian team at the 2018 Eisenhower Trophy where they finished 31st together as a team.

== Professional career ==
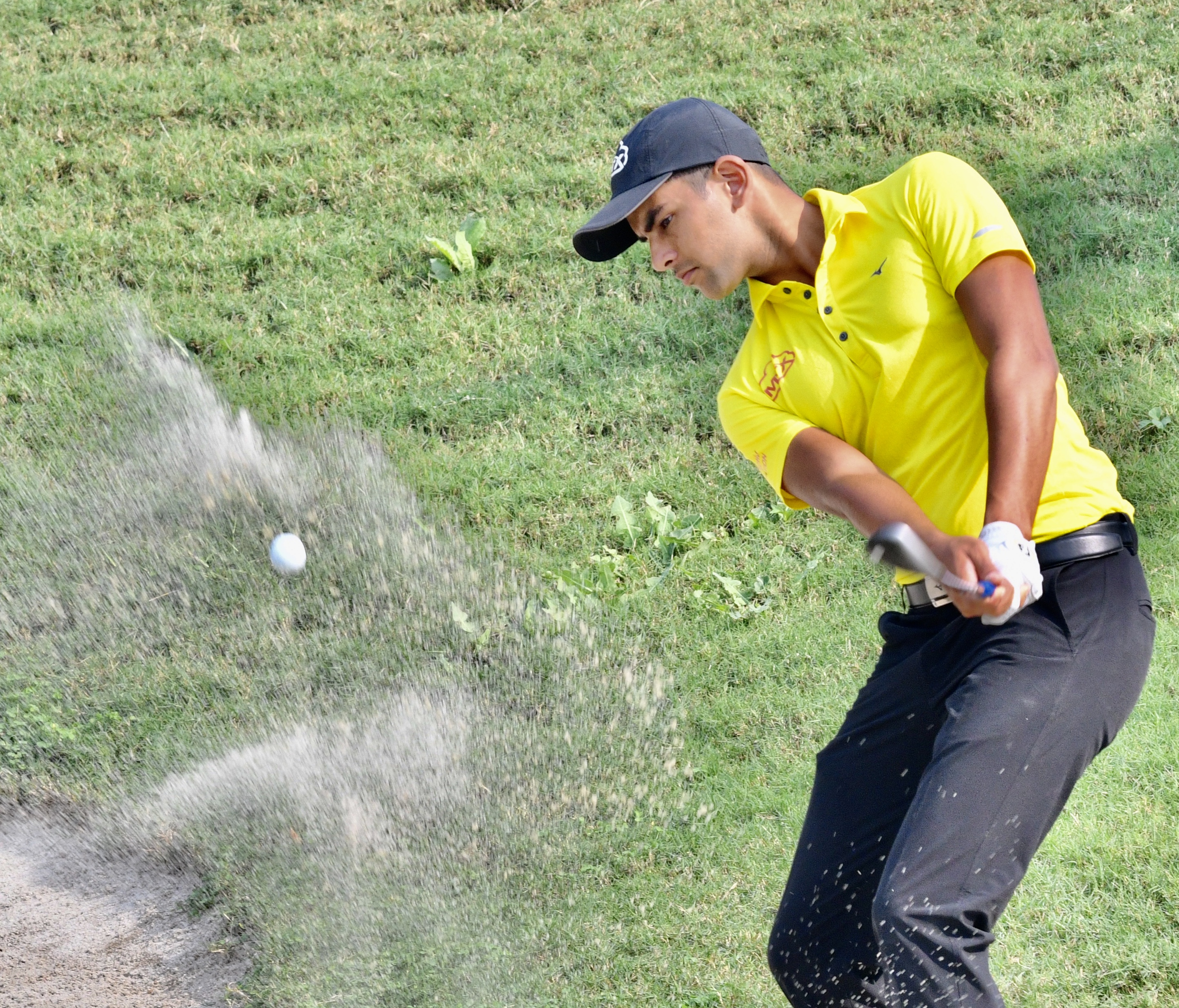
Professional Golfer Aadil Bedi

Bedi turned professional in September 2018 at the age of 17. He earned his playing rights on the domestic Professional Golf Tour of India (PGTI) in 2019 when he finished 3rd at the Finals of the qualifying school in Ahmedabad.

Bedi won his first event as a professional on the PGTI in 2020 at the Bengal Open Championship in Kolkata at the Tollygunge Club. At the end of 72 holes of competition, Bedi tied with Udayan Mane, and beat the latter in a six-hole playoff.

He is also a full member of the Asian Tour, having earned his card through country exemptions and qualifying school in 2019. His best finish on that tour is 4th at the Classic Golf and Country Club International Championship in the same year.

== Amateur wins ==
- 2016 Karnataka Junior Golf Championship, Northern India Junior Boys, IJGT Albatross Tournament
- 2017 Western India Amateur, SSG-BLR International Amateur Championship, Las Vegas World Star of Junior Golf

== Professional wins (1) ==
=== Professional Golf Tour of India wins (1) ===
No.	Date	Tournament	Winning score	Margin of victory	Runner-up
1	15 Mar 2020	Bengal Open	−14 (65-65-67-69=266)	Playoff	(India) Udayan Mane

== Team appearances ==
Amateur

- Eisenhower Trophy (representing India): 2018
- Asian Games (representing India): 2018
