= 2020–21 Professional Golf Tour of India =

Golf tour season

2020–21 Professional Golf Tour of India season
- Duration: 7 February 2020 – 29 December 2021
- Number of official events: 20 (Note: One further tournament was scheduled but was postponed.)
- Most wins: (India) Udayan Mane (4)
- Order of Merit: (India) Udayan Mane

The 2020–21 Professional Golf Tour of India, titled as the 2020–21 Tata Steel Professional Golf Tour of India for sponsorship reasons, was the 14th season of the Professional Golf Tour of India, the main professional golf tour in India since it was formed in 2006.

== Schedule ==
The following table lists official events during the 2020–21 season.

Date	Tournament	Location	Purse (₹)	Winner (Note: The number in brackets after each winner's name is the number of Professional Golf Tour of India events they had won up to and including that tournament.)	OWGR points
8 Feb 2020	Golconda Masters	Telangana	4,000,000	(India) Udayan Mane (9)	7
14 Feb 2020	Tata Steel PGTI Players Championship (Eagleton)	Karnataka	3,000,000	(India) Udayan Mane (10)	5
15 Mar 2020	Bengal Open	West Bengal	3,000,000	(India) Aadil Bedi (1)	5
~~10 Apr 2020~~	Pune Open	Maharashtra	–	Postponed	–
7 Nov 2020	Tata Steel PGTI Players Championship (Panchkula)	Haryana	3,000,000	(India) Akshay Sharma (2)	5
12 Nov 2020; ~~8 May 2020~~	Tata Steel PGTI Players Championship (Chandigarh)	Haryana	3,000,000	(India) Karandeep Kochhar (2)	5
6 Dec 2020	Jeev Milkha Singh Invitational	Haryana	15,000,000	(India) Karandeep Kochhar (3)	5
20 Dec 2020	Tata Steel Tour Championship	Jharkhand	15,000,000	(India) Gaganjeet Bhullar (11)	5
19 Feb 2021; ~~3 Apr 2020~~	Gujarat Open Golf Championship	Gujarat	3,000,000	(India) S. Chikkarangappa (15)	5
26 Feb 2021	Glade One Masters	Gujarat	3,000,000	(India) Om Prakash Chouhan (6)	3
19 Mar 2021; ~~17 Apr 2020~~	Delhi-NCR Open	Haryana	3,000,000	(India) Udayan Mane (11)	5
5 Sep 2021	Golconda Masters Telangana Open	Telangana	4,000,000	(India) Manu Gandas (1)	5
11 Sep 2021	Tata Steel PGTI Players Championship (Panchkula)	Haryana	5,000,000	(India) S. Chikkarangappa (16)	5
18 Sep 2021	J&K Open	Jammu and Kashmir	4,000,000	(India) Honey Baisoya (7)	5
8 Oct 2021	Tata Steel PGTI Players Championship (Delhi)	Delhi	5,000,000	(India) Viraj Madappa (2)	5
15 Oct 2021	Jaipur Open	Rajasthan	4,000,000	(India) Khalin Joshi (5)	5
14 Nov 2021	Jeev Milkha Singh Invitational	Haryana	15,000,000	(India) Shiv Kapur (3)	5
20 Nov 2021	IndianOil Servo Masters Golf	Assam	6,000,000	(India) Yuvraj Sandhu (1)	5
28 Nov 2021	ICC-RCGC Open Golf Championship	West Bengal	4,000,000	(India) Kshitij Naveed Kaul (2)	5
4 Dec 2021	Pune Open Golf Championship	Maharashtra	4,000,000	(India) Abhijit Singh Chadha (3)	5
19 Dec 2021	Tata Steel Tour Championship	Jharkhand	15,000,000	(India) Udayan Mane (12)	5

== Order of Merit ==
The Order of Merit was titled as the Tata Steel PGTI Rankings and was based on prize money won during the season, calculated in Indian rupees.

Position	Player	Prize money (₹)
1	(India) Udayan Mane	5,872,275
2	(India) Karandeep Kochhar	5,100,880
3	(India) S. Chikkarangappa	4,807,880
4	(India) Rashid Khan	4,396,233
5	(India) Veer Ahlawat	4,069,954
