= 2018 Professional Golf Tour of India =

Golf tour season

2018 Professional Golf Tour of India season
- Duration: 24 January 2018 – 23 December 2018
- Number of official events: 19
- Most wins: (India) Honey Baisoya (2)
- Order of Merit: (India) Khalin Joshi

The 2018 Professional Golf Tour of India was the 12th season of the Professional Golf Tour of India, the main professional golf tour in India since it was formed in 2006.

== Schedule ==
The following table lists official events during the 2018 season.

Date	Tournament	Location	Purse (₹)	Winner (Note: The number in brackets after each winner's name is the number of Professional Golf Tour of India events they had won up to and including that tournament.)	OWGR points	Other tours (Note: ADT − Asian Development Tour; ASA − Asian Tour.)
27 Jan	City Bank American Express Dhaka Open	Bangladesh	৳5,000,000	(Bangladesh) Siddikur Rahman (7)	n/a	ADT
3 Feb	Cochin Masters	Kerala	4,000,000	(India) Syed Saqib Ahmed (1)	n/a	
25 Feb	Golconda Masters	Telangana	3,000,000	(India) Udayan Mane (6)	n/a	
4 Mar	Chennai Open Golf Championship	Tamil Nadu	3,000,000	(Sri Lanka) Mithun Perera (6)	n/a	
24 Mar	City Bank American Express Chittagong Open	Bangladesh	4,000,000	(Sri Lanka) Nadaraja Thangaraja (3)	n/a	
13 Apr	Pune Open Golf Championship	Maharashtra	3,000,000	(India) Honey Baisoya (5)	n/a	
20 Apr	Delhi-NCR Open Golf Championship	Uttar Pradesh	3,000,000	(India) Honey Baisoya (6)	n/a	
27 Apr	BTI Open	Bangladesh	US$60,000	(Japan) Kazuki Higa (n/a)	6	ADT
3 Aug	Louis Philippe Cup	Karnataka	US$75,000	(India) Rahil Gangjee (3)	6	ADT
12 Aug	TAKE Solutions Masters	Karnataka	US$350,000	(India) Viraj Madappa (1)	14	ASA
7 Sep	Jaipur Open	Rajasthan	3,000,000	(India) Aman Raj (1)	n/a	
14 Sep	QA InfoTech Open	Uttar Pradesh	5,000,000	(India) Akshay Sharma (1)	n/a	
5 Oct	Kensville Open	Gujarat	4,000,000	(India) Tapy Ghai (1)	n/a	
28 Oct	Panasonic Open India	Delhi	US$400,000	(India) Khalin Joshi (4)	14	ASA
4 Nov	Jeev Milkha Singh Invitational	Haryana	15,000,000	(India) S. Chikkarangappa (12)	n/a	
24 Nov	IndianOil Servo Masters Golf	Assam	4,500,000	(India) Shamim Khan (14)	n/a	
9 Dec	Bengaluru Open Golf Championship	Karnataka	6,000,000	(Sri Lanka) Anura Rohana (6)	n/a	
15 Dec	CG Open	Maharashtra	10,000,000	(India) Rashid Khan (9)	n/a	
23 Dec	Tata Open	Jharkhand	10,000,000	(India) Om Prakash Chouhan (5)	n/a	

== Order of Merit ==
The Order of Merit was based on prize money won during the season, calculated in Indian rupees.

Position	Player	Prize money (₹)
1	(India) Khalin Joshi	6,281,340
2	(India) Viraj Madappa	4,617,097
3	(India) S. Chikkarangappa	4,401,435
4	(India) Om Prakash Chouhan	4,069,844
5	(India) Shamim Khan	3,672,798
