= Lal Bangla =

Coordinates: 28.6003°N 77.2381°E

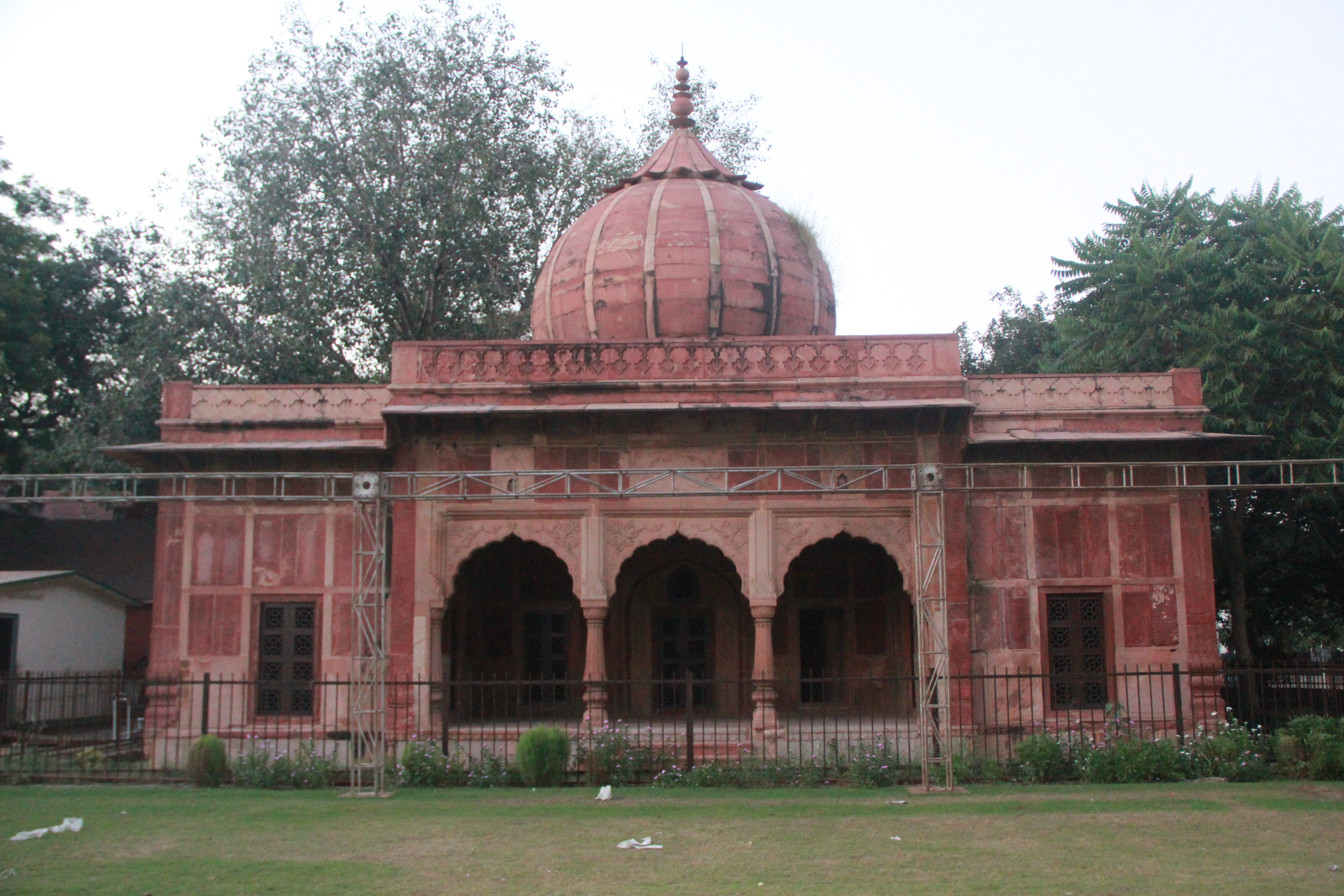
Lal Bangla

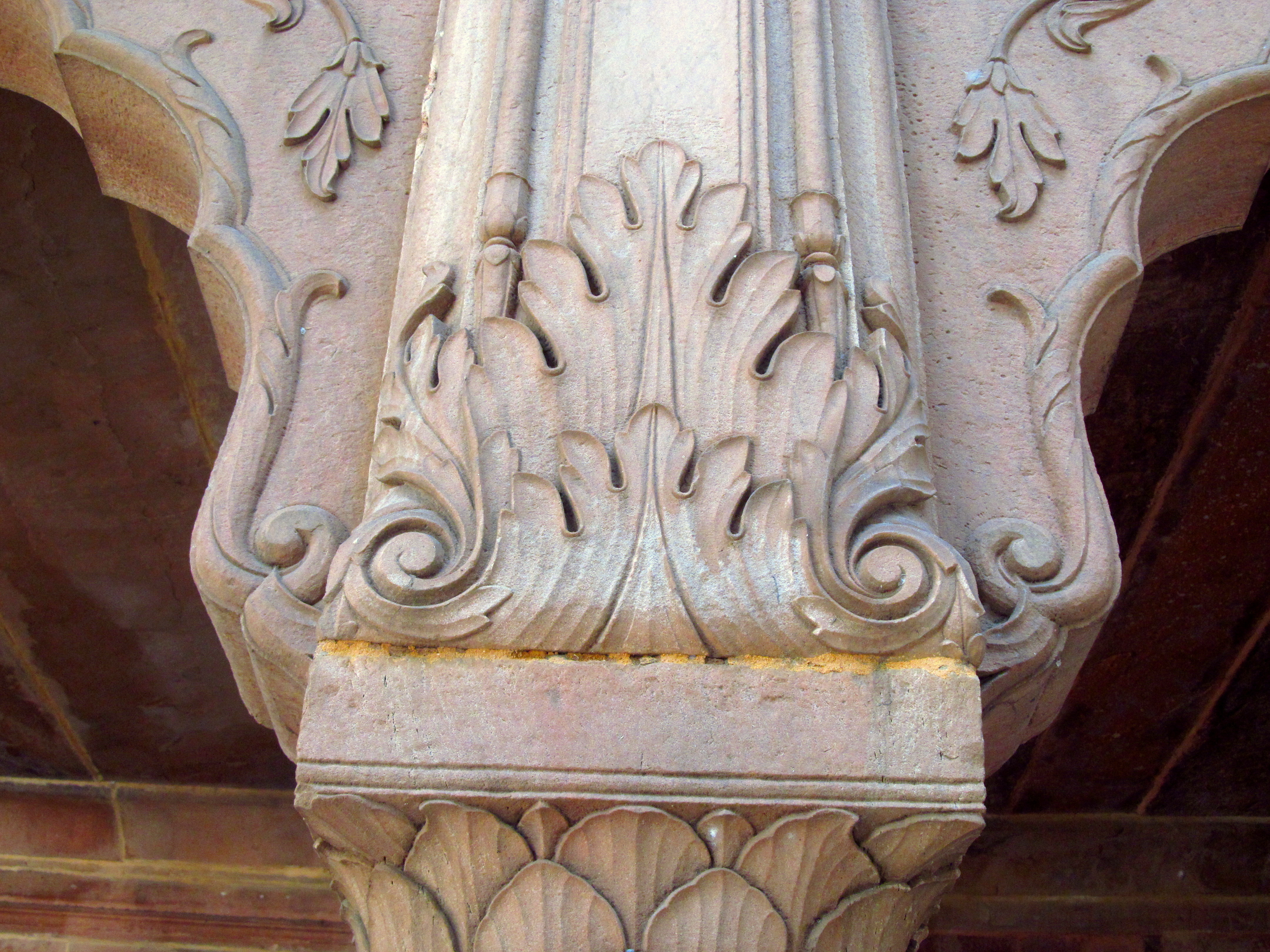
Closeup of sandstone pillar

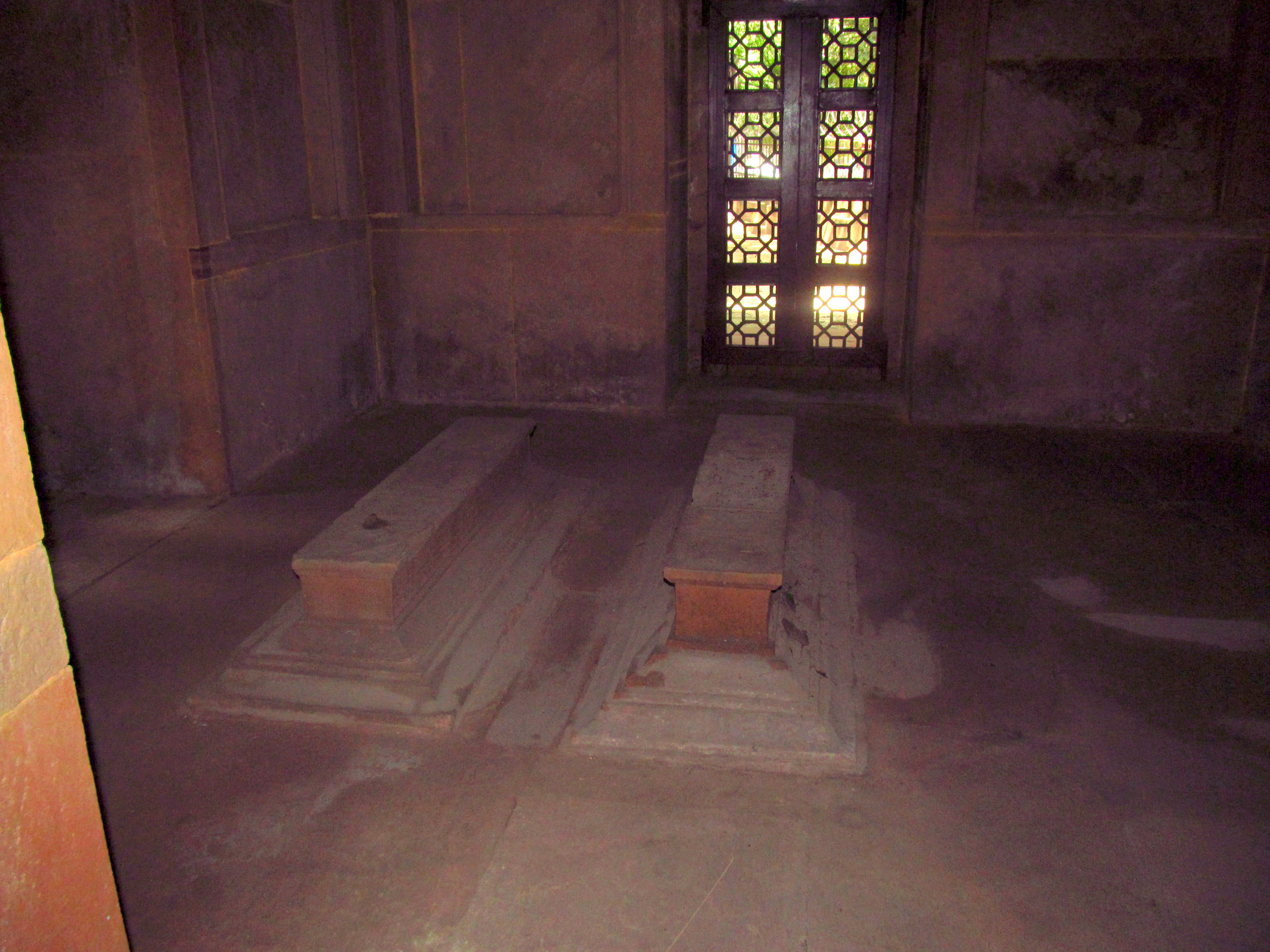
Interior with the cenotaph of Lal Kunwar and her daughter Begum Jaan

Lal Bangla are two imperial late-Mughal mausoleums located in New Delhi in Delhi, India, that are protected monuments under the Archaeological Survey of India.

== Overview ==
Lal Bangla has two tombs made of red and yellow sandstone. One of which is the tomb of Lal Kunwar (Imtiazi Mahal), wife of Mughal Emperor Jahandar Shah (1661 - 1713) and his daughter Begum Jan.

Both mausoleums consist of square rooms at diagonals with oblong halls between them. The mausoleum stands on a red sandstone platform with rooms at corners. The dome of the mausoleum is in the late Mughal style and has a pinnacle at the top. The mausoleums share architectural similarities with the use of red and yellow sandstone of the Tomb of Safdarjung.

The adjoining enclosure has three tombs belong to the family of emperor Akbar II (1806–1837). The buildings are within the premises of the Delhi Golf Club and is not accessible to general public.

Also located within the complex is the tomb of Syed Abid, which was built in 1036 AH (approx. 1626 CE). Sir Syed Ahmed Khan's seminal work on the monuments of Delhi, Aasar Us Sanaadeed mentions Syed Abid as an associate of Khan Dauran Khan, one of Shahjahan's leading soldiers.

== History ==
Lal Bangla is one of the most noteworthy and interesting historical monuments of the Mughal period. There is a debatable matter about the identification of the character who is buried down under the structure of Lal Bangla. A large number of historical researches suggests that the mausoleum belongs to the daughter and mother of a Mughal emperor named Shah Alam. The name of the daughter of Shah Alam is known to be Begam Jaan and of his mother as Zinat Mahal Sahiba or Lal Kunwar.

== See also ==
- List of Monuments of National Importance in Delhi
- Tomb of Mariam-uz-Zamani, resting place of Empress Mariam uz-Zamani, consort of Emperor Akbar
- Tomb of Nur Jahan in Lahore, resting place of Empress Nur Jahan, consort of Emperor Jahangir
- Roshanara Bagh in Delhi, resting place of Roshanara Begum, second daughter of the Emperor Shah Jahan
