= Avantha Masters =

Professional golf tournament

Tournament information
- Location: Greater Noida, India
- Established: 2010
- Courses: Jaypee Greens Golf Club
- Par: 72
- Length: 7,347 yards (6,718 m)
- Tours: European Tour; Asian Tour
- Format: Stroke play
- Prize fund: €1,800,000
- Month played: March
- Final year: 2013

Tournament record score
- Aggregate: 265 Thomas Aiken (2013)
- To par: −23 as above

Final champion
- (South Africa) Thomas Aiken
- Location in India Location in Uttar Pradesh

The Avantha Masters was a professional golf tournament co-sanctioned by the European Tour, Asian Tour and the Professional Golf Tour of India. The tournament was played at the DLF Golf and Country Club in Delhi from 2010 to 2012 and moved to Jaypee Greens Golf Club, Greater Noida in 2013.

The event was tri-sanctioned by the European Tour, the Asian Tour and the Professional Golf Tour of India (PGTI). The 2011 Avantha Masters carried an increased prize fund of €1.8 million.

On 5 September 2013, the tournament's sponsor, Avantha Group, announced it had decided against renewing the contract with the European Tour because of current economic conditions. With the announcement, the Avantha Masters was removed from the 2014 calendar of its three sanctioning Tours.

== Winners ==
Year	Tours (Note: ASA − Asian Tour; EUR − European Tour.)	Winner	Score	To par	Margin of victory	Runner(s)-up
2013	ASA, EUR	(South Africa) Thomas Aiken	265	−23	3 strokes	(India) Gaganjeet Bhullar
2012	ASA, EUR	(South Africa) Jbe' Kruger	274	−14	2 strokes	(Spain) Jorge Campillo (Germany) Marcel Siem
2011	ASA, EUR	(India) Shiv Chawrasia	273	−15	1 stroke	(England) Robert Coles
2010	ASA, EUR	(Australia) Andrew Dodt	274	−14	1 stroke	(England) Richard Finch

== See also ==
- Indian Masters, another co-sanctioned event in India, played in 2008, considered the same tournament as the Avantha Masters by the European Tour but not by the Asian Tour
