= 2017 Professional Golf Tour of India =

Golf tour season

2017 Professional Golf Tour of India season
- Duration: 7 February 2017 – 24 December 2017
- Number of official events: 20
- Most wins: (India) Shamim Khan (3) (India) Udayan Mane (3)
- Order of Merit: (India) Shamim Khan

The 2017 Professional Golf Tour of India was the 11th season of the Professional Golf Tour of India, the main professional golf tour in India since it was formed in 2006.

== Schedule ==
The following table lists official events during the 2017 season.

Date	Tournament	Location	Purse (₹)	Winner (Note: The number in brackets after each winner's name is the number of Professional Golf Tour of India events they had won up to and including that tournament.)	OWGR points	Other tours (Note: ASA − Asian Tour.)
10 Feb	PGTI Players Championship (Noida I)	Uttar Pradesh	3,000,000	(India) Honey Baisoya (3)	n/a	
19 Feb	Golconda Masters	Telangana	4,000,000	(India) Ajeetesh Sandhu (3)	n/a	
2 Mar	BTI Open	Bangladesh	4,000,000	(India) Udayan Mane (3)	n/a	
24 Mar	Kolkata Classic	West Bengal	4,000,000	(India) Shamim Khan (11)	n/a	
1 Apr	City Bank American Express Chittagong Open	Bangladesh	4,000,000	(Bangladesh) Siddikur Rahman (6)	n/a	
15 Apr	Cochin Masters	Kerala	4,000,000	(India) Mukesh Kumar (20)	n/a	
23 Apr	Pune Open Golf Championship	Maharashtra	3,000,000	(Sri Lanka) Anura Rohana (4)	n/a	
6 Aug	TAKE Solutions Masters	Karnataka	US$300,000	(Thailand) Poom Saksansin (n/a)	14	ASA
2 Sep	TAKE Classic	Gujarat	5,000,000	(India) Udayan Mane (4)	n/a	
8 Sep	Kensville Open	Gujarat	4,000,000	(India) Shankar Das (7)	n/a	
16 Sep	Jaipur Open	Rajasthan	3,000,000	(India) Shamim Khan (12)	n/a	
22 Sep	PGTI Players Championship (Noida II)	Uttar Pradesh	3,000,000	(India) Honey Baisoya (4)	n/a	
7 Oct	ONGC Masters	Uttar Pradesh	5,000,000	(India) Amardip Sinh Malik (2)	n/a	
15 Oct	TAKE Open Golf Championship	Haryana	10,000,000	(India) Shubhankar Sharma (5)	n/a	
5 Nov	Panasonic Open India	Delhi	US$400,000	(India) Shiv Kapur (2)	14	ASA
18 Nov	Bengaluru Open Golf Championship	Karnataka	10,000,000	(India) Udayan Mane (5)	n/a	
25 Nov	IndianOil Servo Masters Golf	Assam	4,000,000	(India) Shamim Khan (13)	n/a	
9 Dec	CG Open	Maharashtra	4,000,000	(India) M. Dharma (2)	n/a	
17 Dec	Tata Open	Jharkhand	10,000,000	(Sri Lanka) Anura Rohana (5)	n/a	
24 Dec	McLeod Russel Tour Championship	West Bengal	15,000,000	(India) Shubhankar Sharma (6)	n/a	

== Order of Merit ==
The Order of Merit was based on prize money won during the season, calculated in Indian rupees.

Position	Player	Prize money (₹)
1	(India) Shamim Khan	5,164,233
2	(India) Udayan Mane	4,314,251
3	(Sri Lanka) Anura Rohana	3,395,711
4	(India) Honey Baisoya	3,065,863
5	(India) M. Dharma	2,878,201
