= 2015 Professional Golf Tour of India =

Golf tour season

2015 Professional Golf Tour of India season
- Duration: 3 February 2015 – 27 December 2015
- Number of official events: 15
- Most wins: (India) S. Chikkarangappa (3)
- Order of Merit: (India) S. Chikkarangappa

The 2015 Professional Golf Tour of India was the ninth season of the Professional Golf Tour of India, the main professional golf tour in India since it was formed in 2006.

== Schedule ==
The following table lists official events during the 2015 season.

Date	Tournament	Location	Purse (₹)	Winner (Note: The number in brackets after each winner's name is the number of Professional Golf Tour of India events they had won up to and including that tournament.)	OWGR points	Other tours (Note: ADT − Asian Development Tour; ASA − Asian Tour.)
6 Feb	PGTI Players Championship (Panchkula)	Haryana	3,000,000	(Sri Lanka) Nadaraja Thangaraja (2)	n/a	
13 Feb	Hemisphere PGTI Masters	Uttar Pradesh	3,000,000	(India) Shamim Khan (9)	n/a	
1 Mar	Golconda Masters	Telangana	4,000,000	(India) Harendra Gupta (4)	n/a	
7 Mar	Cochin Masters	Kerala	5,500,000	(India) Mukesh Kumar (16)	n/a	
3 Apr	Ahmedabad Masters	Gujarat	4,000,000	(India) Khalin Joshi (2)	n/a	
10 Apr	PGTI Players Championship (Kensville)	Gujarat	3,000,000	(India) S. Chikkarangappa (6)	n/a	
2 Oct	PGTI Players Championship (Rambagh)	Rajasthan	3,000,000	(India) Udayan Mane (1)	n/a	
9 Oct	BILT Open	Haryana	10,000,000	(India) Abhijit Singh Chadha (2)	n/a	
23 Oct	Western India Oxford Golf Masters	Maharashtra	3,000,000	(India) Udayan Mane (2)	n/a	
31 Oct	TAKE Solutions India Masters	Karnataka	US$120,000	(India) S. Chikkarangappa (7)	6	ADT
8 Nov	Panasonic Open India	Delhi	US$400,000	(India) Chiragh Kumar (5)	14	ASA
21 Nov	IndianOil Servo Masters Golf	Assam	3,000,000	(India) Shankar Das (6)	n/a	
5 Dec	CG Open	Maharashtra	10,000,000	(India) Ashok Kumar (12)	n/a	
20 Dec	Tata Open	Jharkhand	7,500,000	(India) Mukesh Kumar (17)	n/a	
27 Dec	McLeod Russel Tour Championship	West Bengal	15,000,000	(India) S. Chikkarangappa (8)	n/a	

== Order of Merit ==
The Order of Merit was titled as the Rolex Rankings and was based on prize money won during the season, calculated in Indian rupees.

Position	Player	Prize money (₹)
1	(India) S. Chikkarangappa	4,887,440
2	(India) Mukesh Kumar	3,941,710
3	(India) Abhijit Singh Chadha	2,682,203
4	(India) Khalin Joshi	2,639,763
5	(India) Udayan Mane	2,221,507
