= DLF Golf and Country Club =

Country club in Gurgaon, India

Coordinates: 28.455°N 77.106°E

- Interactive map of DLF Golf and Country Club

Club information
- Location: Sector 42 Gurgaon, Haryana, India
- Established: 1999
- Type: Private
- Owner: DLF Universal
- Operator: DLF Universal
- Total holes: 18+9
- Tournaments: Avantha Masters (2010), Indian Open (2009), Johnnie Walker Classic (2008); Hero Women's Indian Open (2007)
- Website: www.dlfgolfresort.com

Championship Course
- Designed by: Gary Player Design
- Par: 72
- Length: 7,204 yards
- Course rating: 132 / 74.6

DLF Golf and Country Club is a country club situated in sector 42 Gurgaon, India, built and maintained by DLF Limited.

The club's championship golf course includes a new 18 hole designed by Gary Player and the original 9-hole designed by Arnold Palmer. This club has hosted many professional tournaments including the Johnnie Walker Classic, an event jointly sanctioned by the European and Asian Tours, in 2008 and the Hero Honda Indian Open, an Asian Tour event, in 2009. For three years starting in 2010 the club has hosted the Avantha Masters, a new Eurasia Golf Limited tournament co-sanctioned by the European, Asian and Indian tours.

== See also ==
- Dominance of Haryana in sports
