= Golf at the 2002 Asian Games – Men's individual =

Men's individual at the 2002 Asian Games
- Venue: Asiad Country Club
- Date: 3 October 2002 – 6 October 2002
- Competitors: 65 from 17 nations

Medalists
gold medal	Shiv Kapur	India
silver medal	Anura Rohana	Sri Lanka
bronze medal	Kim Hyun-woo	South Korea

The men's individual competition at the 2002 Asian Games in Busan was held from 3 October to 6 October at the Asiad Country Club.

== Schedule ==
All times are Korea Standard Time (UTC+09:00)

Date	Time	Event
Thursday, 3 October 2002	09:00	Round 1
Friday, 4 October 2002	09:00	Round 2
Saturday, 5 October 2002	09:00	Round 3
Sunday, 6 October 2002	09:00	Round 4

== Results ==
Legend

- DNF — Did not finish
- DNS — Did not start

Rank	Athlete	Round				Total	To par
Rank	Athlete	1	2	3	4	Total	To par
1st place, gold medalist(s)	Shiv Kapur (IND)	70	75	69	70	284	−4
2nd place, silver medalist(s)	Anura Rohana (SRI)	71	70	73	73	287	−1
3rd place, bronze medalist(s)	Kim Hyun-woo (KOR)	76	75	68	73	292	+4
4	Yūsaku Miyazato (JPN)	78	70	71	73	292	+4
5	Cheng Chen-liang (TPE)	70	72	75	75	292	+4
6	Sung Mao-chang (TPE)	80	70	74	70	294	+6
7	Chang Hong-wei (TPE)	75	67	74	82	298	+10
7	Sung Si-woo (KOR)	78	71	76	73	298	+10
9	Toyokazu Fujishima (JPN)	76	71	72	80	299	+11
9	Kim Byung-kwan (KOR)	79	74	74	72	299	+11
11	Prom Meesawat (THA)	78	71	73	79	301	+13
11	Kwon Ki-taek (KOR)	76	73	77	75	301	+13
11	Tissa Chandradasa (SRI)	74	73	72	82	301	+13
14	Shaaban Hussin (MAS)	75	71	80	76	302	+14
15	Angelo Que (PHI)	74	77	82	70	303	+15
15	Kao Bo-song (TPE)	73	74	77	79	303	+15
15	Yuan Hao (CHN)	79	75	76	73	303	+15
15	Riki Ikeda (JPN)	71	78	74	80	303	+15
19	Juvic Pagunsan (PHI)	75	77	73	79	304	+16
19	Nasser Mubarak (BRN)	78	75	70	81	304	+16
21	Jerome Delariarte (PHI)	76	77	80	72	305	+17
22	Futoshi Fujita (JPN)	81	71	77	78	307	+19
22	Chaddanai Choksuwanlap (THA)	77	78	79	73	307	+19
22	Manav Das (IND)	74	74	84	75	307	+19
25	Siva Chandhran Supramaniam (MAS)	77	75	82	75	309	+21
25	Wu Kangchun (CHN)	79	71	81	78	309	+21
25	Hamad Mubarak Al-Afnan (BRN)	78	73	82	76	309	+21
25	Seruji Hj Setia (BRU)	75	72	82	80	309	+21
29	Liu Qiang (CHN)	75	81	77	77	310	+22
29	Wisut Artjanawat (THA)	78	76	75	81	310	+22
31	Shaiful Saedin (MAS)	75	75	79	84	313	+25
32	Dejpon Poolpun (THA)	82	75	78	79	314	+26
32	Lalith Kumara (SRI)	78	75	78	83	314	+26
34	Lim Eng Seng (MAS)	83	78	77	78	316	+28
35	Ali Hammoud (LIB)	74	85	78	80	317	+29
35	Keshav Misra (IND)	82	80	74	81	317	+29
37	Liao Guiming (CHN)	77	82	76	83	318	+30
38	Hj Arfian Abdul Kadir (BRU)	77	81	76	85	319	+31
39	Marlon Dizon (PHI)	79	78	79	84	320	+32
40	Tang Wai Chun (HKG)	82	79	82	80	323	+35
41	Mazen Hamdan (LIB)	80	76	85	83	324	+36
41	Kim Jung-gwang (PRK)	84	77	78	85	324	+36
43	Kim Myong-chan (PRK)	83	81	83	78	325	+37
44	Rachid Akl (LIB)	77	81	82	86	326	+38
45	Ri Chung-nam (PRK)	83	82	75	87	327	+39
46	Chuda Bahadur Bhandari (NEP)	79	84	83	84	330	+42
47	Harendra Prasad Gupta (IND)	82	78	80	91	331	+43
48	Abdulla Mubarak (BRN)	83	79	83	87	332	+44
48	Hj Shaminan Hj Damit (BRU)	78	82	86	86	332	+44
50	Lee Man Lok (HKG)	82	83	83	85	333	+45
51	Daij Mubarak (BRN)	86	80	86	87	339	+51
52	Sim Te-su (PRK)	90	75	82	94	341	+53
53	Tashi Ghale (NEP)	91	88	83	83	345	+57
54	Tariq Abu-Mooza (QAT)	85	82	85	98	350	+62
55	Mustapha Hj Dollah (BRU)	82	83	88	99	352	+64
55	Raj Pradhan (NEP)	88	88	93	83	352	+64
57	Chan Sio Peng (MAC)	86	86	89	92	353	+65
57	Karim Sinno (LIB)	95	90	85	83	353	+65
59	Deep Bahadur Basnet (NEP)	87	94	86	95	362	+74
60	Mohammed Al-Kuwari (QAT)	92	86	91	104	373	+85
61	Fahad Al-Naimi (QAT)	94	90	101	90	375	+87
62	Chan M. K. (MAC)	98	107	91	100	396	+108
63	Shiga Shinichi (MAC)	90	102	103	112	407	+119
—	Ghanem Al-Kuwari (QAT)	88	89	87	DNS	DNF	
—	João de Senna Fernandes (MAC)	102	85	102	DNS	DNF	
