= Anura Rohana =

Sri Lankan professional golfer

Personal information
- Full name: Anura Rohana
- Nickname: Tuttu
- Nationality: Sri Lanka
- Born: 11 September 1973 (age 53)

Career
- Sport: Golf
- Turned professional: 2002
- Current tours: Professional Golf Tour of India; Asian Tour; Asian Development Tour
- Professional wins: 7
Medal record
Asian Games
Silver medal – second place	2002 Busan	Individual

Anura Rohana (born 11 September 1973) is a Sri Lankan professional golfer. He plays primarily on the Professional Golf Tour of India, where he has won three times. He also plays on the Asian Tour and Asian Development Tour, primarily in events played in India. He won a silver medal at the 2002 Asian Games.

== Amateur wins ==
- 1998 Malaysian Amateur Open
- 2000 Bangladesh Amateur Open
- 2001 Bangladesh Amateur Open, Pakistan Amateur Open
- 2002 Bangladesh Amateur Open

== Professional wins (7) ==
=== Professional Golf Tour of India wins (6) ===
No.	Date	Tournament	Winning score	Margin of victory	Runner(s)-up
1	17 Sep 2011	Global Green Bangalore Open	−12 (68-68-71-69=276)	6 strokes	(India) Mukesh Kumar
2	10 Aug 2012	PGTI Players Championship (Prestige)	−7 (71-73-68-69=281)	1 stroke	(India) Anirban Lahiri
3	10 Oct 2014	BILT Open	−14 (67-70-68-69=274)	2 strokes	(India) Shankar Das
4	23 Apr 2017	Pune Open Golf Championship	−10 (71-68-70-65=274)	2 strokes	(India) Angad Cheema, (India) Khalin Joshi
5	17 Dec 2017	Tata Open	−19 (69-61-66-69=265)	4 strokes	(India) Vikrant Chopra, (India) Manu Gandas, (India) Shamim Khan, (India) Viraj Madappa, (India) Raju Ali Mollah
6	9 Dec 2018	Bengaluru Open Golf Championship	−19 (67-64-67-71=269)	3 strokes	(India) Aman Raj

=== Other wins (1) ===
- 2009 Surya Nepal Masters
