= Shiv Kapur =

Indian professional golfer

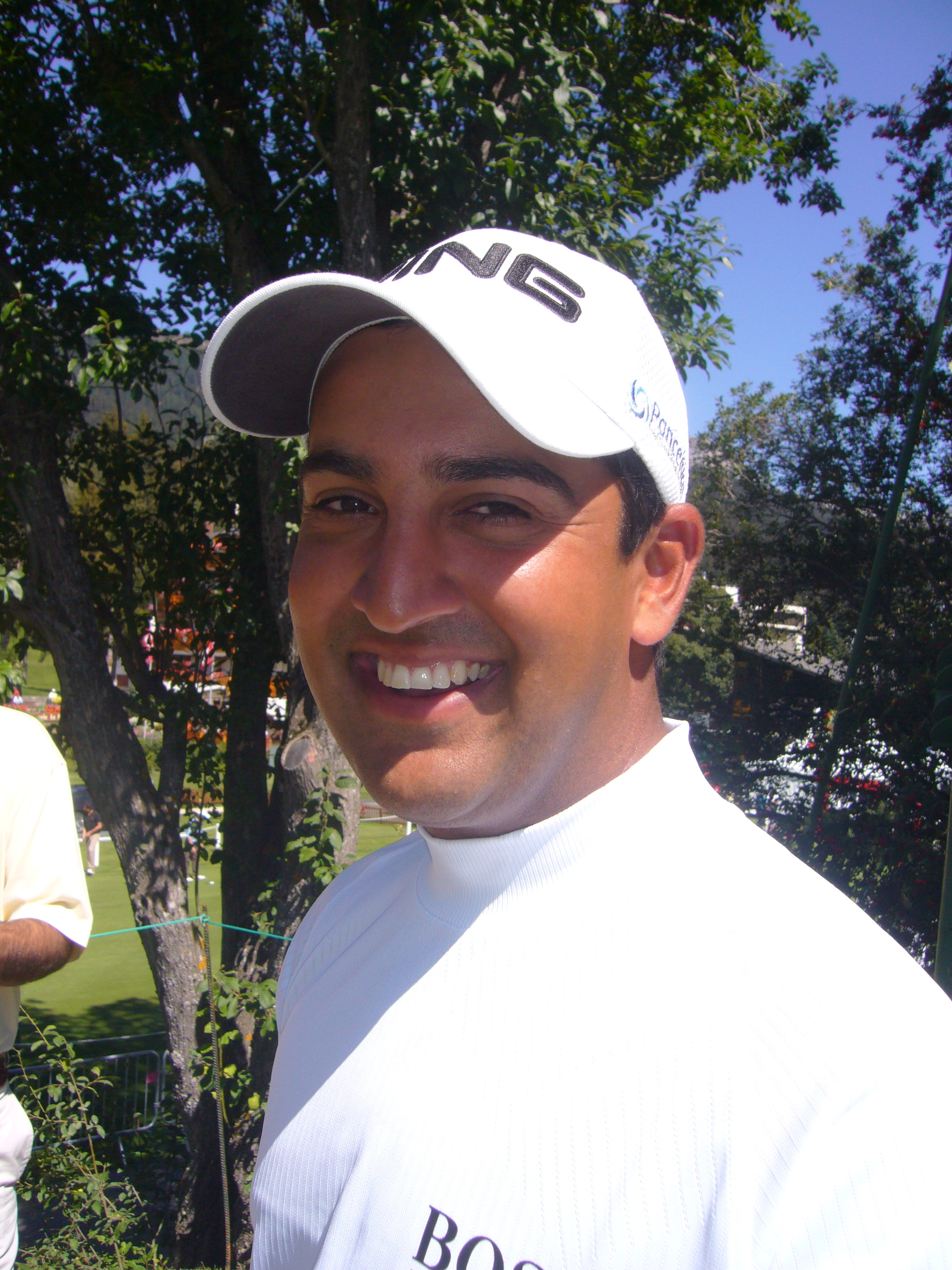

Personal information
- Nationality: India
- Born: 12 February 1982 (age 44) New Delhi, India
- Height: 1.77 m (5 ft 10 in)
- Weight: 80 kg (180 lb; 13 st)

Career
- Sport: Golf
- College: Purdue University
- Turned professional: 2004
- Current tours: Asian Tour; Professional Golf Tour of India
- Former tours: European Tour; Challenge Tour
- Professional wins: 7

Number of wins by tour
- Asian Tour: 4
- Challenge Tour: 2
- Other: 2

Best results in major championships
- Masters Tournament: DNP
- PGA Championship: DNP
- U.S. Open: T23: 2014
- The Open Championship: T73: 2013

Achievements and awards
- Arjuna Award: 2002
- Asian Tour Rookie of the Year: 2005
Medal record
Asian Games
Gold medal – first place	2002 Busan	Men's individual

Shiv Kapur (born 12 February 1982) is an Indian professional golfer.

== Amateur career ==
Kapur went to Purdue University and played the amateur circuit in the United States. He had a successful amateur career, winning the Indian and Malaysian Amateur Opens in 2000 and an individual gold medal at the 2002 Asian Games.

== Professional career ==
Kapur turned professional in 2004 and made a considerable impact in his second season on the Asian Tour by winning the season ending Volvo Masters of Asia and finishing the year fourth on the Asian Tour Order of Merit. Kapur works with instructor Peter Murphy out of Dallas, Texas.

He joined the European Tour in 2007, having earned enough as an affiliate member in 2006 to merit a tour card. His best finish that season came at the Enjoy Jakarta Astro Indonesia Open, where he finished tied for second place.

Kapur's best opportunity at clinching a European Tour victory came at the 2009 South African Open Championship. He lost in a playoff to Richie Ramsay.

== Awards and honors ==
In 2002, Kapur was bestowed the Arjuna Award.

== Amateur wins ==
- 2000 Indian Amateur Open, Malaysian Amateur Open
- 2002 Asian Games

== Professional wins (7) ==
=== Asian Tour wins (3) ===
No.	Date	Tournament	Winning score	Margin of victory	Runner(s)-up
1	11 Dec 2005	Volvo Masters of Asia	−20 (66-67-68-67=268)	2 strokes	(India) Jyoti Randhawa
2	30 Apr 2017	Yeangder Heritage^{1}	−16 (71-70-67-64=272)	2 strokes	(South Korea) Chang Yi-keun, (Malaysia) Gavin Green
3	5 Nov 2017	Panasonic Open India^{2}	−17 (65-69-69-68=271)	3 strokes	(India) Shiv Chawrasia, (India) Om Prakash Chouhan, (India) Karandeep Kochhar, (India) Chiragh Kumar, (United States) Paul Peterson, (India) Ajeetesh Sandhu, (India) Sudhir Sharma

^{1}Co-sanctioned by the Taiwan PGA Tour
^{2}Co-sanctioned by the Professional Golf Tour of India

Asian Tour playoff record (0–2)

No.	Year	Tournament	Opponent(s)	Result
1	2005	Double A International Open	(Thailand) Chinnarat Phadungsil (a)	Lost to birdie on second extra hole
2	2019	Thailand Open	(United States) John Catlin, (Thailand) Pavit Tangkamolprasert	Catlin won with birdie on first extra hole

=== Challenge Tour wins (2) ===
Legend
Grand Finals (1)
Other Challenge Tour (1)

No.	Date	Tournament	Winning score	Margin of victory	Runner(s)-up
1	3 Feb 2013	Gujarat Kensville Challenge^{1}	−14 (67-71-65-71=274)	2 strokes	(Scotland) Andrew McArthur
2	3 Nov 2013	Dubai Festival City Challenge Tour Grand Final	−16 (69-66-67-70=272)	4 strokes	(Portugal) José-Filipe Lima, (Scotland) Jamie McLeary

^{1}Co-sanctioned by the Professional Golf Tour of India

=== Professional Golf Tour of India wins (3) ===
No.	Date	Tournament	Winning score	Margin of victory	Runner(s)-up
1	3 Feb 2013	Gujarat Kensville Challenge^{1}	−14 (67-71-65-71=274)	2 strokes	(Scotland) Andrew McArthur
2	5 Nov 2017	Panasonic Open India^{2}	−17 (65-69-69-68=271)	3 strokes	(India) Shiv Chawrasia, (India) Om Prakash Chouhan, (India) Karandeep Kochhar, (India) Chiragh Kumar, (United States) Paul Peterson, (India) Ajeetesh Sandhu, (India) Sudhir Sharma
3	14 Nov 2021	Jeev Milkha Singh Invitational	−19 (64-68-67-70=269)	Playoff	(India) Rashid Khan

^{1}Co-sanctioned by the Challenge Tour
^{2}Co-sanctioned by the Asian Tour

=== Other wins (1) ===
No.	Date	Tournament	Winning score	Margin of victory	Runner-up
1	31 Dec 2017	Royal Cup	−14 (67-68-68-67=270)	1 stroke	(Thailand) Prom Meesawat

== Playoff record ==
European Tour playoff record (0–1)

No.	Year	Tournament	Opponent	Result
1	2009	South African Open Championship	(Scotland) Richie Ramsay	Lost to par on first extra hole

== Results in major championships ==
Tournament	2006	2007	2008	2009	2010	2011	2012	2013	2014	2015	2016	2017
Masters Tournament												
U.S. Open									T23	CUT		
The Open Championship	CUT							T73				CUT
PGA Championship												

Did not play

CUT = missed the half-way cut
"T" = tied

== Results in World Golf Championships ==
Tournament	2006
Match Play	
Championship	
Invitational	65

Did not play

== Team appearances ==
Amateur

- Eisenhower Trophy (representing India): 2000, 2002
- Bonallack Trophy (representing Asia/Pacific): 2002 (winners), 2004 (winners)

== See also ==
- 2013 Challenge Tour graduates
