= Yeangder Heritage =

Tournament information
- Location: Taipei, Taiwan
- Established: 2017
- Course: National Golf Country Club
- Par: 72
- Length: 7,014 yards (6,414 m)
- Tours: Asian Tour; Taiwan PGA Tour
- Format: Stroke play
- Prize fund: US$300,000
- Month played: April
- Final year: 2017

Tournament record score
- Aggregate: 272 Shiv Kapur (2017)
- To par: −16 as above

Final champion
- (India) Shiv Kapur
- Location in Taiwan

The Yeangder Heritage was a golf tournament on the Asian Tour. It was played for the first time in April 2017 at the National Golf Country Club in Taipei, Taiwan. Prize money was US$300,000. The tournament is an upgrade of the Ambassador ADT tournament played on the Asian Development Tour in 2015 and 2016.

== Winners ==
Year	Tours (Note: ASA − Asian Tour; TWN − Taiwan PGA Tour.)	Winner	Score	To par	Margin of victory	Runners-up
2017	ASA, TWN	(India) Shiv Kapur	272	−16	2 strokes	(South Korea) Chang Yi-keun (Malaysia) Gavin Green
