= 2026 Professional Golf Tour of India =

Golf tour season

2026 Professional Golf Tour of India season
- Duration: 3 February 2026 – 18 October 2026
- Number of official events: 19
- Most wins: (India) Khalin Joshi (4)
- Order of Merit: (India) Saptak Talwar

The 2026 Professional Golf Tour of India, titled as the 2026 DP World Professional Golf Tour of India for sponsorship reasons, was the 19th season of the Professional Golf Tour of India, the main professional golf tour in India since it was formed in 2006.

== DP World title sponsorship ==
In February, it was announced that the tour had signed a title sponsorship agreement with DP World, being renamed as the DP World Professional Golf Tour of India.

== Schedule ==
The following table lists official events during the 2026 season.

Date	Tournament	Location	Purse (₹)	Winner (Note: The number in brackets after each winner's name is the number of Professional Golf Tour of India events they had won up to and including that tournament.)	OWGR points	Other tours (Note: CHA − Challenge Tour; EUR − European Tour.)
6 Feb	SECL Chhattisgarh Open Golf Championship	Chhattisgarh	15,000,000	(United States) Jhared Hack (1)	1.07	
13 Feb	DP World Players Championship (Qutab)	Delhi	15,000,000	(India) Honey Baisoya (8)	1.19	
20 Feb	DP World Players Championship (Tollygunge)	West Bengal	15,000,000	(India) Om Prakash Chouhan (12)	1.26	
15 Mar	Indorama Ventures Open Golf Championship	Gujarat	US$300,000	(India) Saptak Talwar (2)	2.29	~~CHA~~
22 Mar	DP World PGTI Open	Haryana	US$300,000	(South Africa) M. J. Daffue (n/a)	6.68	CHA
29 Mar	Hero Indian Open	Haryana	US$2,550,000	(England) Alex Fitzpatrick (n/a)	17.02	EUR
10 Apr	Andhra Open Golf Championship	Andhra Pradesh	10,000,000	(India) Khalin Joshi (7)	1.10	
17 Apr	Boulders Classic	Hyderabad	10,000,000	(India) Shubhankar Sharma (7)	1.24	
24 Apr	DP World Players Championship (Classic)	Haryana	10,000,000	(India) Akshay Sharma (3)	1.00	
7 Aug	J&K Open	Jammu and Kashmir	10,000,000	(India) Khalin Joshi (8)	0.95	
14 Aug	Coal India Open	Kolkata	10,000,000	(India) Shubham Jaglan (1)	1.10	
21 Aug	Kolar Open	Bengaluru	10,000,000	(India) Mohd Azhar (1)	0.97	
28 Aug	Telangana Open	Telangana	10,000,000	(India) Rashid Khan (12)	0.86	
4 Sep	Telangana Golconda Masters	Hyderabad	10,000,000	(India) Vishesh Sharma (1)	0.97	
11 Sep	Chennai Open	Chennai	10,000,000	(India) Viraj Madappa (4)	1.05	
18 Sep	Nava Raipur Open	Chhattisgarh	10,000,000	(India) Khalin Joshi (9)	0.43	
25 Sep	Bengaluru Open	Bengaluru	10,000,000	(India) Khalin Joshi (10)	0.98	
10 Oct	Kapil Dev Invitational Tour Championship	Greater Noida	20,000,000	(India) Shubhankar Sharma (8)	1.07	
18 Oct	DP World India Championship	Delhi	US$4,000,000	(Spain) Eugenio Chacarra (n/a)	26.47	EUR

== Order of Merit ==
The Order of Merit was based on prize money won during the season, calculated in Indian rupees. The leading player on the Order of Merit earned status to play on the 2027 European Tour (DP World Tour).

Position	Player	Prize money (₹)	Status earned
1	(India) Saptak Talwar	10,247,684	Promoted to European Tour
2	(India) Khalin Joshi	7,732,225	
3	(India) Veer Ahlawat	6,597,400	
4	(India) Honey Baisoya	5,985,292	
5	(India) Om Prakash Chouhan	5,861,201	
