= TAKE Solutions Masters =

Golf tournament on the Asian Tour

Tournament information
- Location: Bangalore, India
- Established: 2014
- Course: Karnataka Golf Association
- Par: 71
- Length: 7,074 yards (6,468 m)
- Tours: Asian Tour; Asian Development Tour; Professional Golf Tour of India
- Format: Stroke play
- Prize fund: US$350,000
- Month played: August
- Final year: 2018

Tournament record score
- Aggregate: 263 S. Chikkarangappa (2015); 263 Shubhankar Sharma (2015)
- To par: −25 as above

Final champion
- (India) Viraj Madappa
- Location in India Location in Karnataka

The TAKE Solutions Masters was a golf tournament on the Asian Tour. It was co-sanctioned with the Professional Golf Tour of India.

The TAKE Solutions India Masters was played on the Asian Development Tour in 2014 and 2015. It was held at Eagleton Golf Resort, Bangalore, in late October and early November. Prize money was US$70,000 in 2014 and US$120,000 in 2015. It was played for the first time as an Asian Tour event in August 2017 at the Karnataka Golf Association Golf Course, Bangalore, India. Prize money was US$300,000 in 2017, increasing to US$350,000 in 2018.

== Winners ==
Year	Tours (Note: ADT − Asian Development Tour; ASA − Asian Tour; PGTI − Professional Golf Tour of India.)	Winner	Score	To par	Margin of victory	Runner(s)-up
TAKE Solutions Masters
2018	ASA, PGTI	(India) Viraj Madappa	268	−16	2 strokes	(Thailand) Danthai Boonma (Argentina) Miguel Ángel Carballo (Zimbabwe) Scott Vincent (Thailand) Suradit Yongcharoenchai
2017	ASA, PGTI	(Thailand) Poom Saksansin	268	−16	2 strokes	(India) Khalin Joshi
2016: No tournament
TAKE Solutions India Masters
2015	ADT, PGTI	(India) S. Chikkarangappa (2)	263	−25	Playoff	(India) Shubhankar Sharma
2014	ADT, PGTI	(India) S. Chikkarangappa	270	−18	2 strokes	(India) Abhishek Jha
