= 2023 Professional Golf Tour of India =

Golf tour season

2023 Professional Golf Tour of India season
- Duration: 7 February 2023 – 24 December 2023
- Number of official events: 20
- Most wins: (India) Om Prakash Chouhan (4)
- Order of Merit: (India) Om Prakash Chouhan

The 2023 Professional Golf Tour of India, titled as the 2023 Tata Steel Professional Golf Tour of India for sponsorship reasons, was the 16th season of the Professional Golf Tour of India, the main professional golf tour in India since it was formed in 2006.

== Schedule ==
The following table lists official events during the 2023 season.

Date	Tournament	Location	Purse (₹)	Winner (Note: The number in brackets after each winner's name is the number of Professional Golf Tour of India events they had won up to and including that tournament.)	OWGR points	Other tours (Note: CHA − Challenge Tour; EUR − European Tour.)
10 Feb	Tata Steel PGTI Players Championship (Tollygunge)	West Bengal	10,000,000	(India) Sachin Baisoya (1)	0.50	
26 Feb	Hero Indian Open	Haryana	US$2,000,000	(Germany) Marcel Siem (n/a)	9.29	EUR
4 Mar	Gujarat Open Golf Championship	Gujarat	10,000,000	(India) Aman Raj (2)	0.57	
26 Mar	Duncan Taylor Black Bull Challenge	Karnataka	US$300,000	(India) Om Prakash Chouhan (8)	4.51	CHA
31 Mar	The Challenge	Karnataka	US$300,000	(France) Ugo Coussaud (n/a)	4.65	CHA
7 Apr	Delhi-NCR Open	Uttar Pradesh	10,000,000	(India) Gaurav Pratap Singh (2)	0.85	
15 Apr	Tata Steel PGTI Players Championship (Chandigarh)	Haryana	10,000,000	(India) Karan Pratap Singh (1)	0.64	
22 Apr	Ahmedabad Open Golf Championship	Gujarat	10,000,000	(Bangladesh) Jamal Hossain (1)	0.79	
19 Aug	India Cements Pro Championship	Tamil Nadu	5,000,000	(India) Sunhit Bishnoi (1)	0.54	
25 Aug	Coimbatore Open	Tamil Nadu	10,000,000	(India) Harshjeet Singh Sethie (1)	0.54	
23 Sep	Vizag Open	Andhra Pradesh	10,000,000	(Sri Lanka) Nadaraja Thangaraja (4)	0.52	
30 Sep	Telangana Golconda Masters	Telangana	10,000,000	(India) Aman Raj (3)	0.57	
7 Oct	J&K Open	Jammu and Kashmir	5,000,000	(India) Om Prakash Chouhan (9)	0.43	
28 Oct	Haryana Open	Haryana	10,000,000	(India) Jairaj Singh Sandhu (1)	0.85	
5 Nov	Jeev Milkha Singh Invitational	Haryana	15,000,000	(India) Sachin Baisoya (2)	0.83	
25 Nov	IndianOil Servo Masters Golf	Assam	7,500,000	(India) Om Prakash Chouhan (10)	0.61	
2 Dec	Kapil Dev - Grant Thornton Invitational	Gujarat	20,000,000	(India) Karan Pratap Singh (2)	0.88	
10 Dec	SSP Chawrasia Invitational	West Bengal	10,000,000	(India) Om Prakash Chouhan (11)	1.06	
16 Dec	Jaipur Open	Rajasthan	10,000,000	(India) Aman Raj (4)	0.80	
24 Dec	Tata Steel Tour Championship	Jharkhand	30,000,000	(India) Gaganjeet Bhullar (13)	1.13	

== Order of Merit ==
The Order of Merit was titled as the Tata Steel PGTI Rankings and was based on prize money won during the season, calculated in Indian rupees. The leading player on the Order of Merit earned status to play on the 2024 European Tour (DP World Tour).

Position	Player	Prize money (₹)	Status earned
1	(India) Om Prakash Chouhan	11,826,059	Promoted to European Tour
2	(India) Aman Raj	9,190,745	
3	(India) Sachin Baisoya	7,848,166	
4	(India) Karan Pratap Singh	7,644,298	
5	(India) Angad Cheema	5,503,417	
