= Royal Cup =

Royal's Cup
Tournament information
- Location: Kanchanaburi, Thailand
- Established: 2017
- Course: Grand Prix Golf Club
- Par: 72
- Length: 7,215 yards (6,597 m)
- Tour: Asian Tour
- Format: Stroke play
- Prize fund: US$400,000
- Month played: February
- Final year: 2022

Tournament record score
- Aggregate: 265 Chan Shih-chang (2022)
- To par: −23 as above

Final champion
- (Taiwan) Chan Shih-chang

Location map
- Location in Thailand

The Royal's Cup is a golf tournament on the Asian Tour, played in Thailand.

It was played for the first time as a "special event" at the end of December 2017 at the Phoenix Gold Golf and Country Club, Pattaya, Thailand. There was a field of 78 and there was no cut. Prize money was US$500,000.

The second event was a full Asian Tour event played in July 2018. Prize money was again US$500,000. Justin Harding won by 6 strokes with a score of 266.

== Winners ==
Year	Tour (Note: ASA − Asian Tour.)	Winner	Score	To par	Margin of victory	Runner(s)-up
Royal's Cup
2022	ASA	(Taiwan) Chan Shih-chang	265	−23	3 strokes	(Thailand) Sadom Kaewkanjana (United States) Sihwan Kim
Royal Cup
2021: No tournament
2020	ASA	Cancelled due to the COVID-19 pandemic				
2019: No tournament
2018	ASA	(South Africa) Justin Harding	266	−14	6 strokes	(India) Shiv Kapur (United States) Kurt Kitayama (Australia) Jake McLeod (Thailand) Chapchai Nirat
2017		(India) Shiv Kapur	270	−14	1 stroke	(Thailand) Prom Meesawat
