= Delhi Golf Club =

Golf course in India

Coordinates: 28.598445°N 77.235646°E

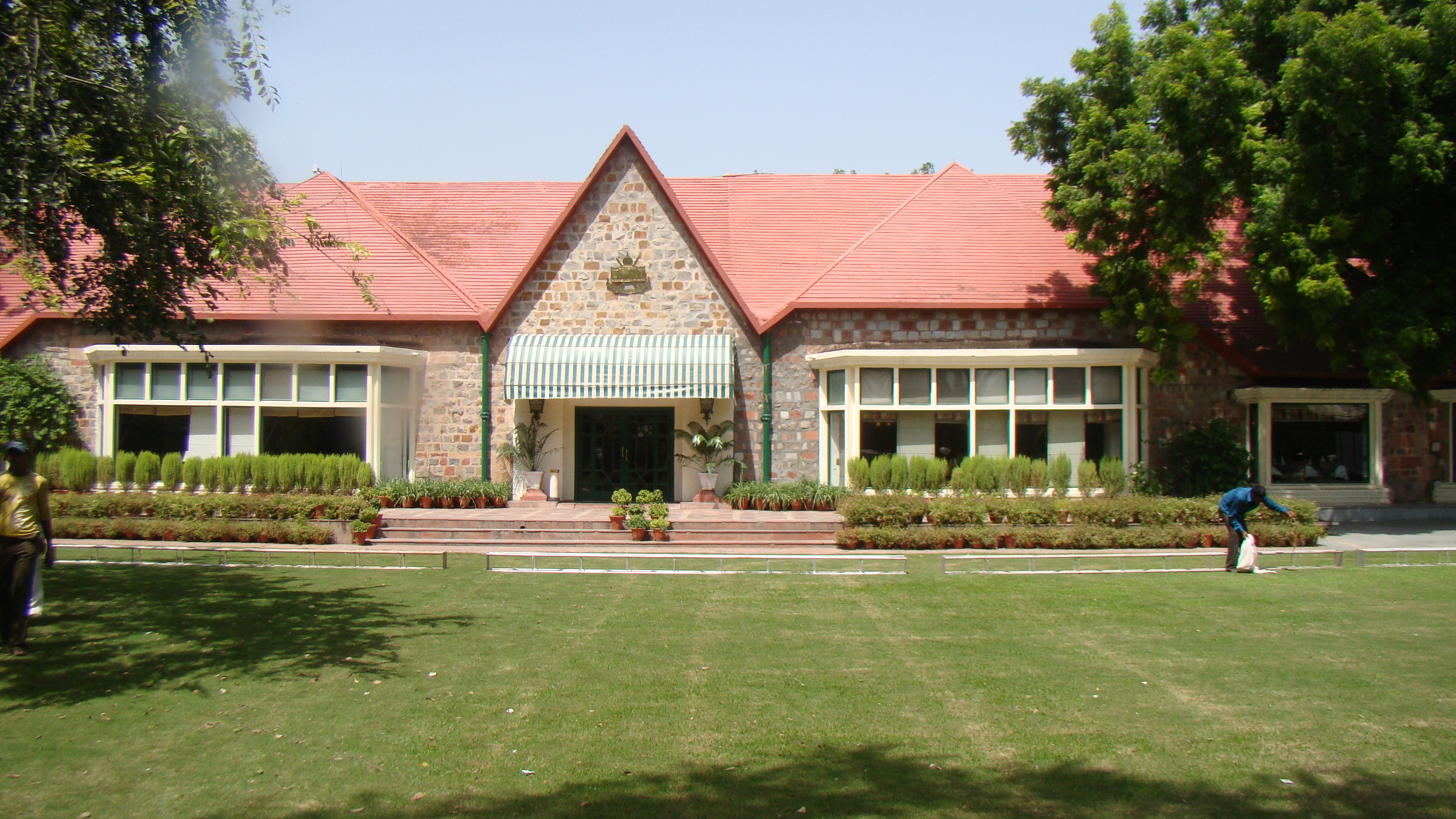
- Interactive map of Delhi Golf Club

Club information
- Location: Delhi, India
- Established: 1948
- Type: Private
- Owner: Delhi Golf Club
- Operator: Delhi Golf Club
- Total holes: 18+9
- Tournaments: Indian Open; DP World India Championship
- Website: www.dgc.com

Championship Course
- Designed by: Peter Thomson, (1976); Gary Player Design, (2019)
- Par: 72
- Length: 7,036 yards
- Course rating: 130 / 73.5

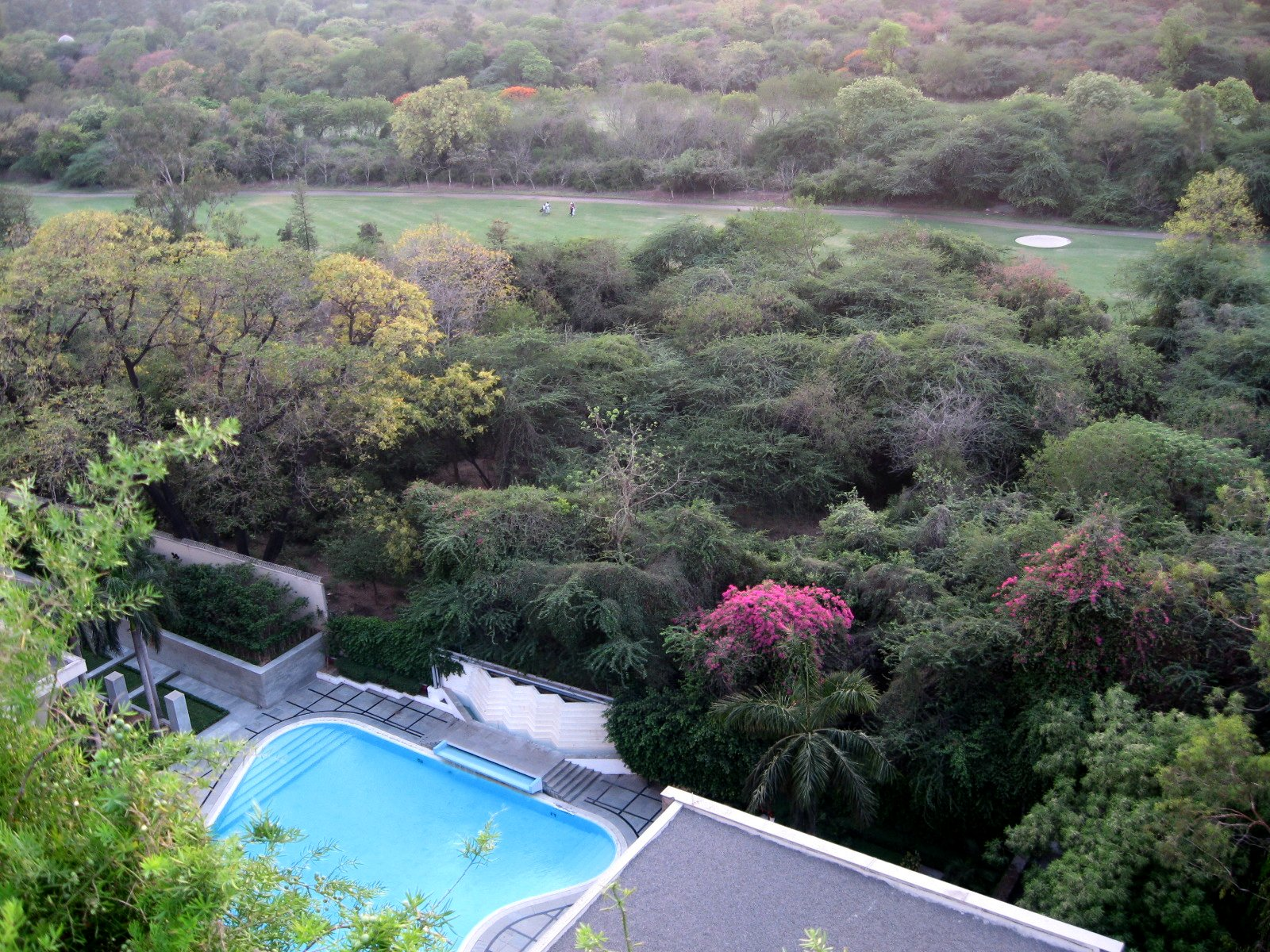
View on to the fairway from the Oberoi Hotel

The Delhi Golf Club (DGC) is a prominent golf club situated in Delhi, India. It has ultra restrictive membership, with well over a waiting period of over 30 years for prospective members. It is close to Delhi's top tourist sites of India Gate, Humayun's Tomb, Delhi Zoo, and Lodhi Gardens. DGC comprises 18-hole course designed by the Gary Player Design studio, which is part of the Asian PGA Tour, and a shorter 9-hole course, and sprawling club house with swimming pool.

== History ==
The original course, called the Lodhi Golf Club, laid out in the 1930s by the then Chief of the Horticultural Department, was much larger than the present walled area, and included parts of present Golf Links and Kaka Nagar. The Lodhi Golf Club, however, had few members, and was barely sustainable, except for a brief period during the Second World War when Delhi was awash with Allied officers who patronized the club. In 1948, the club had eighty members, and in 1951, when it became the Delhi Golf Club (DGC), its membership was no more than 120, and was barely sustainable. The Club was saved from dissolution by Indian officers belonging to the Indian Civil Service, including Dharma Vira, founder member of the DGC, who petitioned Prime Minister Nehru to lease the government land to the club at a low annual rent for thirty years. Since that time, the Government of India has favored the DGC with very permissive lease terms and low annual rents that have no relationship to the actual value of the land. The DGC has evolved as a favorite watering hole for senior Civil Servants, Police Officers and the business and social elite. The walled area of the club includes a large number of interesting Mughal archeological remains such as the famous Lal Bangla.

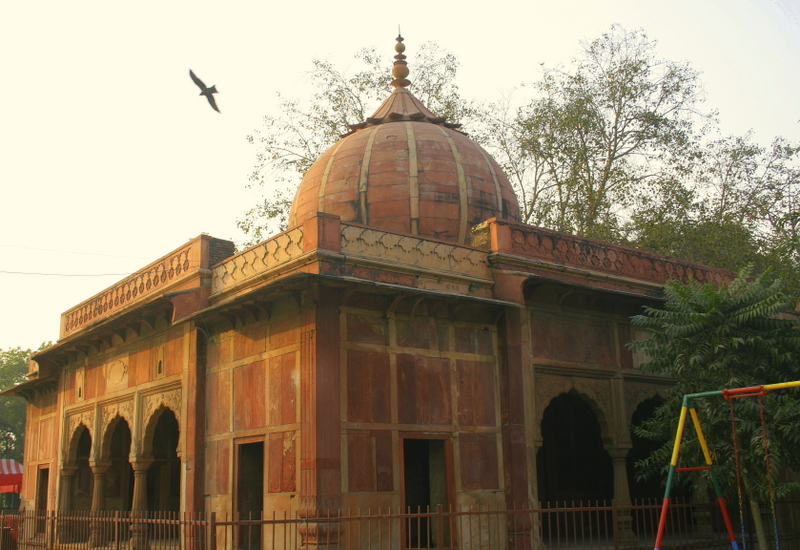
Lal Bangla, tombs of Lal Kuwar, wife of Jahandar shah, and Begum Jaan his daughter, built c. 1780

== Course ==
The course comprises the championship 18-hole "Lodhi Course", which is part of the Asian PGA Tour, and the shorter 9-hole "Peacock Course". The latter came into being when the course was re-designed by Peter Thomson in 1976–77. The DGC hosts various tournaments and cups, such as the Indian Open. In 2019 the Gary Player Design firm completely redesigned the golf course.

=== Subsidy ===
The Delhi Golf Club has an area of 220 acres (89 ha), the market value of which is estimated between ₹47000 crores and 60,000 crores or about USD 8 to 10 billion at ₹60 to a dollar. The DGC club house, including the course, is on government land. The lease for the land is periodically renewed by the government at a rate which has no relationship to the market value of the land. The current annual rent that the club pays to the government is just ₹5.82 lakh per year(approximately USD 9700 at ₹60 to a dollar). In 2012, eight years before the lease was due for renewal, Kamal Nath, the Minister of Urban Development in the United Progressive Alliance government, approved extension of the lease until 2050.

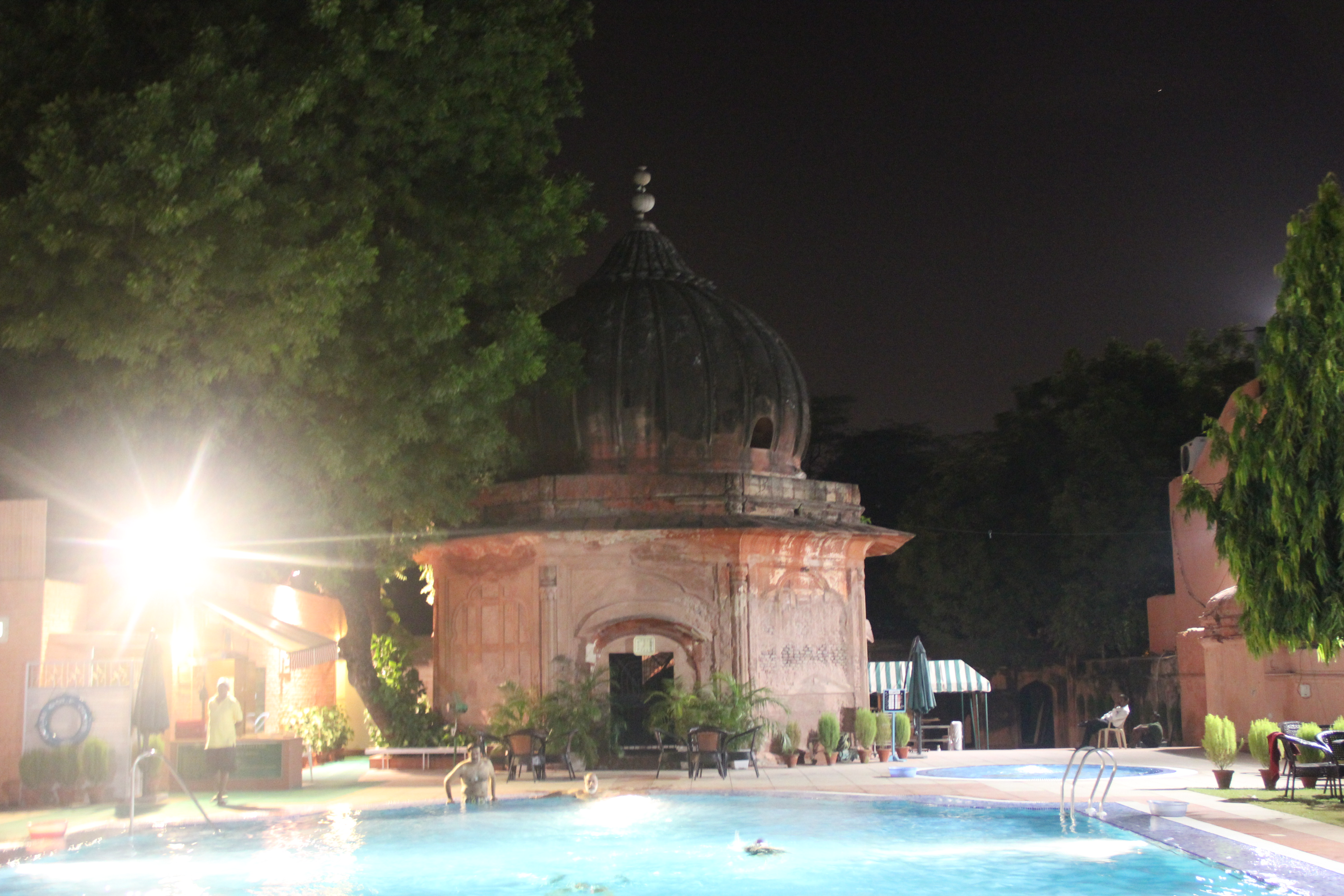
Delhi golf Club pool

The DGC has about 4000 members, majority of whom are serving or retired members of the Indian Civil Services, judges, and politicians. The annual subsidy by the Government to every member is estimated to be approximately ₹1.5 crores (USD 250,000).

== Management committee ==
The DGC management committee consists of a President, a Course Captain and twelve general committee members, excluding government nominated members. Posts on the management committee are filled through election. These are usually held in September.

== Air quality ==
The DGC has not escaped Delhi's poor air quality. In the evening illumination, as well as the early morning sun, "the shroud of carcinogenic particles hovering above the bunkers and greens" are very visible.

== Allegations of racism and elitism ==
In June 2017, a woman named Tailin Lyngdoh, a Khasi, had gone to the Club along with her employer Nivedita Barthakur after they were invited for lunch by a member of the Club. However, 15–20 minutes into the lunch, two Club officials asked Lyngdoh to leave the table saying the dress (Jainsem) she was wearing was a "maid's uniform" which looked like a "dustbin" and also allegedly hurled racial abuse at her. This incident was widely covered in the Indian media condemning the classism attitude of the Delhi Golf Club and elite clubs of India in general.

== See also ==
- Delhi Gymkhana
- India Habitat Centre
