= Royal Calcutta Golf Club =

Golf club in Kolkata, India

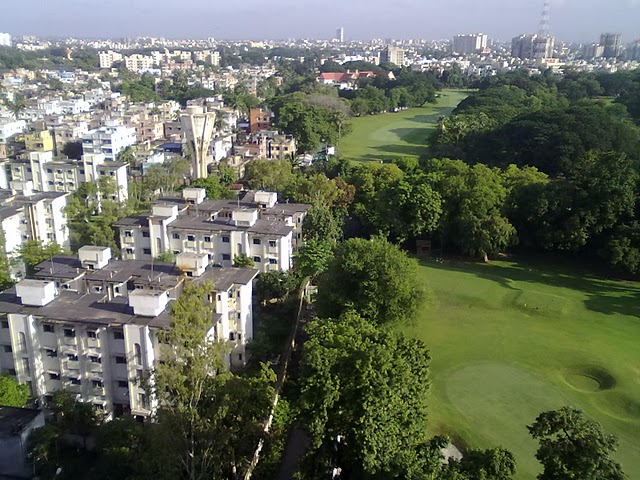
- Aerial view of the Royal Calcutta Golf Club (right) and Kolkata (left)
- Interactive map of Royal Calcutta Golf Club
- 22.493°N 88.355°E

Club information
- Location: 18 Golf Club Road, Tollygunge; Kolkata 700 033, India
- Established: 1829; 197 years ago
- Tota holes: 18
- Website: www.rcgc.in
- Par: 72
- Length: 7195/6871
- Course rating: 73.6/72.1

Royal Calcutta Golf Club (RCGC) in Kolkata, India was established in 1829 and is the oldest golf club in India and the first outside Great Britain.

RCGC has an 18-hole golf course with the following detail:

- Yardage: 7195/6871
- Par: 72
- Rating: 73.6/72.1
- Mostly flat terrain, with many natural water hazards with water lilies and largish greens.

The Royal Calcutta Golf Club is the oldest golf club outside the United Kingdom. The oldest club outside Scotland is the Royal Blackheath Golf Club in London, established in 1766.

King George V and Queen Mary conferred the title "Royal" to the club to commemorate their visit to Calcutta in 1911. Apart from golf, it offers tennis courts and a swimming pool. The club also maintains a Lawn Bowls Pavilion in the Kolkata Maidan.

The golf course is a green oasis in the city, and is home to foxes, snakes and mongoose as well as many birds.

Shiv Chawrasia is a member, his father was a greenkeeper and he started out as a caddie, but he currently plays on the European Tour.

== Scorecard ==
Royal Calcutta Golf Club
Tee	Rating/Slope	1	2	3	4	5	6	7	8	9	Out	10	11	12	13	14	15	16	17	18	In	Total
Blue		359	151	405	520	426	422	415	403	398	3499	432	409	368	194	413	503	356	379	428	3479	6978
White		347	143	375	487	409	417	400	355	389	3322	414	399	337	179	394	489	351	355	418	3336	6658
Yellow		340	139	365	460	398	367	314	349	346	3078	385	349	331	156	350	405	330	335	364	3078	6083
Red		304	136	325	454	353	328	298	340	342	2880	378	343	286	127	324	401	328	332	362	2881	5761
Par		4	3	4	5	4	4	4	4	4	36	4	4	4	3	4	5	4	4	4	36	72
SI		11	17	3	13	9	5	1	15	7		2	8	14	16	4	12	18	10	6

== See also ==
- List of golf clubs granted Royal status
- List of India's gentlemen's clubs
