= Aman Raj =

Indian golfer (born 1995)

Personal information
- Nationality: India
- Born: 5 May 1995 (age 31) Patna, India

Career
- Sport: Golf
- Turned professional: 2016
- Current tours: Indian Golf Premier League; Asian Development Tour
- Former tours: Asian Tour; Professional Golf Tour of India
- Professional wins: 4

Aman Raj (born 5 May 1995) is an Indian golfer from Patna, Bihar, India. He was a part of the Indian Golf Team (Under-19).

== Early life and education ==
Raj was born and grew up in Patna. He is the son of golf coach Shri Shashi Raj Sinha and Madhulika Sinha. He attended Kendriya Vidyalaya on Bailey Road. While a student he played golf at the Patna Golf Club. He began learning golf under the guidance of his father Shashi Raj sinha, a Certified Coach of National Golf Academy of India (NGAI), at the age of 3 years. At the age of seven, he won the prize in Outstation Golf Tournament.

After graduating from high school, Raj later attended Indira Gandhi National Open University.

== Career ==
Raj participated in several Junior National Category tournaments including Delhi, Kolkata, Bangalore and Mumbai. When he was eleven, he participated in north–south-East & West Zonal Tournament Coimbatore, Mumbai, Bangalore, Kolkata, Delhi and was ranked 12th, 11th, 5th respectively. At age 12, he was named "Golfer of the Year" at the Patna Golf Club as the youngest "Golfer of The Year".

At 13, he played several Junior National Categorized Golf Tournaments organized by Indian Golf Union and received a National Level ranking. (Delhi-9th position, Kolkata-8th position). At 14, he played several IGU Tournaments and was ranked - 4th at New Delhi and Jaipur and 5th at Gurgaon. He won IGU Eastern India Junior at Kolkata, was second runner-up at Bangalore and Kolkata and runner-up at All India Juniors, Pune.

Raj was again declared "Golfer Of The Year" at the Patna Golf Club at the age of 14 and won many club level golf tournaments. Later, he participated in the International Asia Pacific Junior Golf Championship, Bangalore. He was ranked 6th (sixth) National Merit List 2009–2010 in India. At 15, he was runner-up at The Lalit National Inter School Golf Championship - New Delhi. He also hit a hole-in-one at the Southern India Junior Golf Championship, Bangalore.

In May 2012, 17-year old Raj won Usha IGU Karnataka Open Junior Golf championship held in Bangalore. Raj placed fourth at the Par 72 Ryo Ishikawa World Junior Invitational Golf Championship held between 1 and 5 August 2012 at the Royal Meadow Golf Stadium in Tokyo, Japan.

In 2013, Raj continued to place highly in various tournaments in India.

In 2015, Raj was listed by the Indian Golf Union as the top ranking amateur golfer in India. That year he took part in the Nomura Cup tournament.

In 2016, he qualified to play in the PTGI tournaments. and in April he played his first game at the Pune Open. He competed in the Taifong Open tournament and the PGM Penang Championship.

== Professional wins (4) ==
=== Professional Golf Tour of India wins (4) ===
| No. | Date | Tournament | Winning score | Margin of victory | Runner(s)-up |
|---|---|---|---|---|---|
| 1 | 7 Sep 2018 | Jaipur Open | −22 (64-67-62-65=258) | 3 strokes | (India) Honey Baisoya |
| 2 | 4 Mar 2023 | Gujarat Open Golf Championship | −11 (66-68-70-73=277) | 1 stroke | (India) Aryan Roopa Anand |
| 3 | 30 Sep 2023 | Telangana Golconda Masters | −18 (66-65-63-68=262) | 1 stroke | (India) Yashas Chandra |
| 4 | 16 Dec 2023 | Jaipur Open | −19 (65-66-64-66=261) | 1 stroke | (India) Sunhit Bishoi, (India) Saptak Talwar |

== Playoff record ==
Asian Tour playoff record (0–1)

| No. | Year | Tournament | Opponents | Result |
|---|---|---|---|---|
| 1 | 2019 | Sabah Masters | (Australia) David Gleeson, (Thailand) Phachara Khongwatmai, (Thailand) Pavit Tangkamolprasert | Tangkamolprasert won with birdie on second extra hole Raj eliminated by par on first hole |

== Team appearances ==
Amateur

- Bonallack Trophy (representing Asia/Pacific): 2016
