= Isao Katsumata =

Japanese professional golfer

Personal information
- Nationality: Japan
- Born: 24 August 1937 (age 89) Kanagawa Prefecture, Japan
- Height: 1.70 m (5 ft 7 in)
- Weight: 76 kg (168 lb; 12.0 st)

Career
- Sport: Golf
- Turned professional: 1959
- Former tours: PGA of Japan Tour; Asia Golf Circuit
- Professional wins: 1

Isao Katsumata (勝俣功, Isao Katsumata; born 24 August 1937) is a Japanese professional golfer.

== Professional career ==
Early in his career Katsumata was associated with Daihakone Country Club. In November 1961, he played the Japan Open Golf Championship at Takanodai Country Club in Yokodomachi, Chiba, Japan. Katsumata finished the tournament at 289 (+1) to tie for the clubhouse lead. Kenji Hosoishi and Taiwan's Chen Ching-Po had birdie putts on the last hole to take the solo lead but missed. Katsumata entered a five-way playoff with Hosoishi, Chen, Taiwan's Hsieh Yung-yo, and countryman Koichi Ono. A sudden-death playoff was played in "semi-darkness." Katsumata, Hosoishi, and Ono outlasted the Taiwanese players on the first two playoff holes. On the third hole, however, Hosoishi made a par-4 to win. Ono and Katsumata finished in second place.

In March 1962, he played the Yomiuri International on the Far East Circuit. The event was held at Kawasaski Country Club in Tokyo, Japan. Katsumata opened with a three-under-par 69 to take one-stroke lead over Al Balding and Haruyoshi Kobari. He broke Gary Player's course record. However, in the second round "fell apart" with a 77 (+5). He dropped into a tie for 10th place, six back of leader Peter Thomson. In the third round he shot an even-par 72 to move up into a tie for seventh. However, he was not near the lead as the tournament concluded.

In 1963, Katsumata intended to play extensively on the Far East Circuit again. He intended to play the Malayan Open and Singapore Open. He was considered one of the Japanese favorites at the Singapore Open.

In 1964 he played the Far East Circuit. He had much success over the course of the season. In late February he began play at the Philippine Open. The event was held at Wack Wack Golf and Country Club in Manila, Philippines. Katsumata opened with even-par rounds of 72 to put him in a tie for fourth place with Doug Sanders, four back of leader Bob Charles. So far Katsumata had outplayed a number of notable players including Peter Thomson, Gene Littler, and Mike Souchak. In the third round he shot a 73 (+1). Despite the higher score he moved into a tie for third place with Sanders and Thomson, though now six strokes behind leader Charles. In the final round, however, leader Charles played poorly opening doors to the field. Katsumata was unable to take advantage, though, shooting a 74 (+2) to finish in a tie for sixth place. The following week the played the Capitol Hills Open, also in the Philippines. After three rounds he was again in contention, this time at 216, five back of leaders Thomson and Tomoo Ishii. He again played poorly in the final round, however, shooting a 75 to finish in a tie for 10th. The following week he played the Singapore Open. He opened with a 72 (−1) to put him in a tie for 8th place with Frank Phillips, three back of the lead. In the second round he shot a 74 (+1) but against "heavy rains" this was among the better rounds of the day. He moved into a tie for third place, one back of leaders Ralph Moffitt and Brian Huggett. In the third round he shot a 75 (+2) but still remained in contention, four back of leader Huggett. In the final round he again played poorly, however, shooting a 77 (+4) to fall into a tie for 18th place. Later in the year, in August, he was chosen as an alternate for Japan's 1964 Canada Cup team.

As of January 27, 1965, he had committed to the Singapore Open. In early March he played the event. After three rounds Katsumata was at 216 (−3), nine shots behind leader Tadashi Kitta. However, he shot a final round 67 (−6) to finish solo fourth.

In 1966 he again played the Singapore Open. After three rounds he was in contention at 216 (+3), five back of the lead. In the final round he shot a one-under-par 70 to finish T-4 with Frank Phillips, two out of a playoff. The following week he played the Malayan Open. The event was held at Royal Selangor Golf Club in Kuala Lumpur, Malaysia. He opened with a one-under-par 71 to put him in a tie for 9th place. He remained at one-under-par entering the final round. In the final round he shot a 70 (−2) to move into a tie for fifth place with countryman Kenji Hosoishi, seven back of champion Harold Henning.

In March 1967 he had some success at the Thailand Open. It was the fourth event of the 1967 Far East Circuit. He opened with a 71 (−1) to put him in a tie for fourth place, three back of leader Hsu Chi-san. He eventually finished at 292 (+4) for solo seventh place.

In late February 1970, he began play at the Singapore Open. After three rounds he was in contention, three back at 211 (−2), in a tie for 11th place. However, he shot a final round 74 (+3) to fall into a tie for 24th place. In late March, Katsumata began play at the Hong Kong Open. The event was held at the par-70 Fanling Golf Course. After two rounds Katsumata was at 138 (−2), four back of leader Haruo Yasuda. In the third round he shot a "blistering" 66, recording five birdies again one bogey, to move into the lead. He led by one over American Bruce Fleisher, recent U.S. Amateur champion, and Yasuda. According to The Straits Times, it was a surprise that Katsumata was in the lead as he was considered "a virtual unknown." In his final round, Katsumata had a "shaky start" recording two bogeys against one birdie. However, he "steadied himself" on the back nine and scored a 35 (−1). With an even-par-70, Katsumata defeated Yasuda by one. Soon after he won he was "greeted" with "tumultuous cheers" from the gallery. "My dream is now fulfilled," he said after the event. "I am a very happy man."

In late February 1971, he played the Philippine Open, the first leg of the 1971 Asia Golf Circuit. He shot rounds of 81 (+9) and 79 (+7) and missed the cut by several shots. The next tournament was the Singapore Open. Katsumata opened with a 70 to put him near the top ten, three back of the lead. He eventually finished in 12th place. The following week he played the Malaysian Open. He was considered one of the favorites. After opening with rounds of 70 he shot a third round 65 to get into contention. However, he shot a final round 75 to finish in a tie for 15th place. Later in March he played the Thailand Open. He opened with a 68 (-4) to put him one behind leader David Oakley, in a tie for second with Ben Arda. However, he finished the tournament outside of the top 25.

After turning 50, Katsumata competed in senior events. He also worked as a golf course designer. In 1993, he completed his design of Sawang Resort & Golf Club near Bangkok, Thailand.

== Professional wins (1) ==
=== Asia Golf Circuit wins (1) ===
No.	Date	Tournament	Winning score	Margin of victory	Runner-up
1	29 Mar 1970	Hong Kong Open	−6 (67-71-66-70=274)	1 stroke	(Japan) Haruo Yasuda
