= Hong Kong Open (golf) =

Golf tournament

Coordinates: 22.492°N 114.115°E

Tournament information
- Location: New Territories, Hong Kong
- Established: 1959
- Course: Hong Kong Golf Club
- Par: 70
- Length: 6,710 yards (6,140 m)
- Tours: European Tour; Asian Tour; Asia Golf Circuit
- Format: Stroke play
- Prize fund: US$2,000,000
- Month played: November

Tournament record score
- Aggregate: 253 Tom McKibbin (2025)
- To par: −27 as above

Current champion
- (United States) John Catlin

Location map
- Location in China Location in Hong Kong

Hong Kong Open
- Traditional Chinese: 香港高爾夫球公開賽
- Simplified Chinese: 香港高尔夫球公开赛
Transcriptions
Standard Mandarin
- Hanyu Pinyin: Xiānggǎng Gāo'ěrfūqiú Gōngkāisài
Yue: Cantonese
- Jyutping: hoeng1 gong2 go1 ji5 fu1 kau4 gung hoi1 coi3

The Hong Kong Open is a golf tournament which is played on the Asian Tour, and formerly on the European Tour. It was founded in 1959 and in 1962 and was one of the five tournaments that made up the inaugural Far East Circuit, later known as the Asia Golf Circuit. It remained part of the circuit until 1996, before joining the Asian Tour, then known as the Omega Tour, in 1997. It became co-sanctioned by the European Tour in 2001, as part of the 2002 season.

The Hong Kong Open was played in spring from its inception until 1994, but since 1995 has usually been played towards the end of the year, in November or December, and as a result has often fallen into the following year's European Tour season.

Since taking its place on the European Tour the event has always been held at the Hong Kong Golf Club in Sheung Shui, New Territories. The Hong Kong Golf Association, Hong Kong PGA, and Chinese PGA receive a limited number of exemptions into the tournament for their members.

== History ==
In 1958, Hong Kong Golf Club member Kim Hall wrote to Australian professional Eric Cremin to see if those players playing in the Philippine Open in 1959 would consider staying in the region to play in Hong Kong. Hall then approached Peter Plumley, secretary of South China Morning Post, who was also a golfer. Plumley then persuaded his boss to sponsor 1,000 Australian pounds in prize money in the name of South China Morning Post. Then, the first Hong Kong Open was launched in February 1959. According to Hong Kong Golf Club member Willie Woo, Kim Hall was very keen for the tournament and he talked a lot with Australian golfers, including Peter Thomson. Woo helped to get Taiwanese players through his connections.

The first tournament was hosted by Sir Robert Black, the then-Governor of Hong Kong. Around one thousand spectators joined the tournament. Taiwanese golfer Lu Liang-Huan won the inaugural edition of the tournament. The success of the Hong Kong Open prompted first Singapore in 1961, and then Malaysia and Japan in 1962, to introduce their own tournaments and bring about the setting up of the Far East Golf Circuit. The circuit further expanded into a regular ten-tournament tour, called the Asia Golf Circuit, that existed until the end of the twentieth century.

Despite the SCMP's original agreement to maintain 1,000 pounds sponsorship of the Hong Kong Open, it was felt that prize money would need to be increased if the best players were to be attracted. To that end the 1963 event was jointly sponsored by the SCMP and British American Tobacco, with the purse being increased to 4,000 pounds as a result.

Due to poor weather conditions during the 1966 event, the Hong Kong Golf Club lost HK$10,442 as the money put up by the sponsors was insufficient to cover expenses. As a result, the club decided that in future it could not undertake to assist financially in any way, but would continued provide the courses and the general facilities. The 1968 tournament was the first edition to be shown live on television. In 1969, the newly formed the Hong Kong Golf Association took up the task of organising the tournament. In 1971, the Hong Kong Open was on the verge of disappearing due to low spectator numbers and financial problems, but with the assistance of the Asia Pacific Golf Confederation, who were keen to retain the event on the Asia Golf Circuit, the tournament was saved.

In 1996, Hong Kong golfer Dominique Boulet finished fourth, the best result by a local golfer. In 2008, Florida-based Hong Kong amateur Hak Shunyat became the youngest player ever to make the cut in a European Tour event, at 14 years and 304 days, eclipsing the record set by Sergio García at the Turespaña Open Mediterrania in 1995. At the other end of the age spectrum, Miguel Ángel Jiménez became the oldest golfer ever to win on the European Tour when he won in 2012 at age 48 years, 315 days, and extended his record by defending his title in 2013 at age 49 years, 337 days.

In 2013, organizers and potential sponsors raised concerns over the complex becoming enmeshed in a controversial redevelopment plan for Fan Ling. The tournament was played that year without a title sponsor.

In 2020, the Hong Kong Open organizers announced that the tournament would be postponed till 2021 due to COVID-19 restrictions.

In March 2023, it was confirmed that the Hong Kong Open would return after a two-year hiatus as an Asian Tour event. The tournament would also gain International Series status.

== Winners ==
Year	Tour(s) (Note: AGC/FEC − Asia Golf Circuit/Far East Circuit; ASA − Asian Tour; EUR − European Tour.)	Winner	Score	To par	Margin of victory	Runner(s)-up	Ref.
Link Hong Kong Open
2026	ASA	(United States) John Catlin	260	−20	5 strokes	(Hong Kong) Matthew Cheung (Finland) Kalle Samooja	
2025	ASA	(Northern Ireland) Tom McKibbin	253	−27	7 strokes	(United States) Peter Uihlein	
2024	ASA	(United States) Patrick Reed	258	−22	3 strokes	(New Zealand) Ben Campbell	
Hong Kong Open
2023	ASA	(New Zealand) Ben Campbell	261	−19	1 stroke	(Australia) Cameron Smith	
2021–22: No tournament
2020	ASA, ~~EUR~~ (Note: Due to 2019–2020 Hong Kong protests, the event was postponed and rescheduled and was removed from the European Tour schedule. It proceeded as a sole-sanctioned Asian Tour event.)	(Australia) Wade Ormsby (2)	263	−17	4 strokes	(Republic of Ireland) Shane Lowry	
2019: No tournament
Honma Hong Kong Open
2018	ASA, EUR	(England) Aaron Rai	263	−17	1 stroke	(England) Matt Fitzpatrick	
UBS Hong Kong Open
2017	ASA, EUR	(Australia) Wade Ormsby	269	−11	1 stroke	(Sweden) Alexander Björk (Spain) Rafa Cabrera-Bello (United States) Paul Peterson (United States) Julian Suri	
2016	ASA, EUR	(Australia) Sam Brazel	267	−13	1 stroke	(Spain) Rafa Cabrera-Bello	
2015	ASA, EUR	(England) Justin Rose	263	−17	1 stroke	(Denmark) Lucas Bjerregaard	
Hong Kong Open
2014	ASA, EUR	(Australia) Scott Hend	267	−13	Playoff (Note: Hend won with a par on the first hole of a sudden-death playoff.)	(Philippines) Angelo Que	
2013	ASA, EUR	(Spain) Miguel Ángel Jiménez (4)	268	−12	Playoff (Note: Jiménez won with a birdie on the first hole of a sudden-death playoff.)	(Wales) Stuart Manley (Thailand) Prom Meesawat	
UBS Hong Kong Open
2012	ASA, EUR	(Spain) Miguel Ángel Jiménez (3)	265	−15	1 stroke	(Sweden) Fredrik Andersson Hed	
2011	ASA, EUR	(Northern Ireland) Rory McIlroy	268	−12	2 strokes	(France) Grégory Havret	
2010	ASA, EUR	(England) Ian Poulter	258	−22	1 stroke	(England) Simon Dyson (Italy) Matteo Manassero	
2009	ASA, EUR	(France) Grégory Bourdy	261	−19	2 strokes	(Northern Ireland) Rory McIlroy	
2008	ASA, EUR	(Taiwan) Lin Wen-tang	265	−15	Playoff (Note: Lin won with a birdie on the second hole of a sudden-death playoff; Molinari was eliminated on the first extra hole after making a par to Lin and McIlroy's birdies.)	(Northern Ireland) Rory McIlroy (Italy) Francesco Molinari	
2007	ASA, EUR	(Spain) Miguel Ángel Jiménez (2)	265	−15	1 stroke	(South Korea) K. J. Choi (Thailand) Thongchai Jaidee (Sweden) Robert Karlsson	
2006	ASA, EUR	(Spain) José Manuel Lara	265	−15	1 stroke	(Philippines) Juvic Pagunsan	
2005	ASA, EUR	(Scotland) Colin Montgomerie	271	−9	1 stroke	(South Korea) K. J. Choi (South Africa) James Kingston (Taiwan) Lin Keng-chi (United States) Edward Loar (Thailand) Thammanoon Sriroj	
Omega Hong Kong Open
2004	ASA, EUR	(Spain) Miguel Ángel Jiménez	266	−14	1 stroke	(Republic of Ireland) Pádraig Harrington (South Africa) James Kingston	
2003	ASA, EUR	(Republic of Ireland) Pádraig Harrington	269	−11	1 stroke	(South Africa) Hennie Otto	
2002	ASA, EUR	(Sweden) Freddie Jacobson	260	−16	2 strokes	(Argentina) Jorge Berendt (Sweden) Henrik Nyström	
2001	ASA, EUR	(Spain) José María Olazábal	262	−22	1 stroke	(Norway) Henrik Bjørnstad	
2000	ASA	(England) Simon Dyson	263	−21	3 strokes	(Australia) Kim Felton (United States) John Kernohan (South Korea) Charlie Wi	
Perrier Hong Kong Open
1999	ASA	(Sweden) Patrik Sjöland	269	−11	1 stroke	(Wales) Ian Woosnam	
1998	ASA	(South Korea) Kang Wook-soon	272	−12	2 strokes	(England) Ed Fryatt	
Andersen Consulting Hong Kong Open
1997	ASA	(New Zealand) Frank Nobilo	267	−17	5 strokes	(South Korea) Kang Wook-soon	
1996	AGC	(Philippines) Rodrigo Cuello	275	−5	3 strokes	(United States) Scott Hoch (Scotland) Bill Longmuir	
Hong Kong Open
1995	AGC	(United States) Gary Webb	271	−13	2 strokes	(Mexico) Rafael Alarcón	
Kent Hong Kong Open
1994	AGC	(South Africa) David Frost	274	−10	Playoff (Note: Frost won on the first hole of a sudden-death playoff, after McClellan had holed his second shot from the fairway for an eagle 2 on the final hole of regulation play to force the playoff.)	(United States) Craig McClellan	
1993	AGC	(United States) Brian Watts	274	−10	1 stroke	(Taiwan) Chen Tze-chung	
Hutchison Telecom Hong Kong Open
1992	AGC	(United States) Tom Watson	274	−10	3 strokes	(Northern Ireland) Ronan Rafferty	
1991	AGC	(Germany) Bernhard Langer	269	−15	7 strokes	(South Korea) Choi Sang-ho (Taiwan) Lu Wen-teh	
Martell Hong Kong Open
1990	AGC	(United States) Ken Green	205 (Note: Shortened to 54 holes due to rain.)	−8	4 strokes	(Canada) Danny Mijovic (United States) Brian Watts	
Johnnie Walker Hong Kong Open
1989	AGC	(United States) Brian Claar	274	−6	1 stroke	(Sweden) Mats Lanner (United States) Gary Rusnak	
Unisys Hong Kong Open
1988	AGC	(Taiwan) Hsieh Chin-sheng	274	−10	1 stroke	(Taiwan) Lu Chien-soon	
United Airlines Hong Kong Open
1987	AGC	(Wales) Ian Woosnam	275	−9	4 strokes	(Northern Ireland) David Feherty (Scotland) Sam Torrance	
Cathay Pacific Hong Kong Open
1986	AGC	(Japan) Seiichi Kanai	285	+1	1 stroke	(Australia) Ian Baker-Finch	
1985	AGC	(United States) Mark Aebli	270	−10	4 strokes	(Taiwan) Chen Tze-ming	
1984	AGC	(United States) Bill Brask	268	−12	7 strokes	(Australia) Greg Norman	
1983	AGC	(Australia) Greg Norman (2)	134 (Note: Shortened to 36 holes due to rain.)	−6	3 strokes	(England) Mark James	
1982	AGC	(United States) Kurt Cox	276	−4	Playoff (Note: Cox won with a par on the fourth hole of a sudden-death playoff; Gale was eliminated after making bogey on the first hole of the playoff.)	(Australia) Terry Gale (United States) Tom Sieckmann	
1981	AGC	(Taiwan) Chen Tze-ming	279	E	1 stroke	(Australia) Graham Marsh	
1980	AGC	(Taiwan) Kuo Chie-Hsiung	274	−5	2 strokes	(Taiwan) Lu Liang-Huan	
1979	AGC	(Australia) Greg Norman	273	−6	3 strokes	(Taiwan) Lu Hsi-chuen (Taiwan) Chen Tze-ming (Taiwan) Hsu Chi-san	
Hong Kong Open
1978	AGC	(Taiwan) Hsieh Yung-yo (4)	275	−4	1 stroke	(South Korea) Kim Seung-hack	
1977	AGC	(Taiwan) Hsieh Min-Nan	280	E	1 stroke	(Japan) Teruo Sugihara	
1976	AGC	(Taiwan) Ho Ming-chung	279	−1	2 strokes	(Taiwan) Hsu Sheng-san	
1975	AGC	(Taiwan) Hsieh Yung-yo (3)	288	+8	1 stroke	(Australia) Ted Ball (United States) Gaylord Burrows (Australia) Stewart Ginn	
1974	AGC	(Taiwan) Lu Liang-Huan (2)	280	E	Playoff (Note: Lu won with a birdie on the third hole of a sudden-death playoff.)	(Australia) Graham Marsh	
1973	AGC	(Australia) Frank Phillips (2)	278	−6	1 stroke	(Philippines) Ben Arda	
1972	AGC	(New Zealand) Walter Godfrey	272	−8	2 strokes	(Japan) Takashi Murakami	
1971	AGC	(United States) Orville Moody	266	−14	2 strokes	(Japan) Haruo Yasuda	
1970	AGC	(Japan) Isao Katsumata	274	−6	1 stroke	(Japan) Haruo Yasuda	
1969	AGC	(Japan) Teruo Sugihara	274	−6	2 strokes	(England) Maurice Bembridge	
1968	AGC	(Australia) Randall Vines	271	−9	1 stroke	(Japan) Teruo Sugihara	
1967	FEC	(Australia) Peter Thomson (3)	273	−7	Playoff (Note: Thomson won on the second hole of a sudden-death playoff.)	(Wales) Brian Huggett	
1966	FEC	(Australia) Frank Phillips	275	−5	2 strokes	(Japan) Hideyo Sugimoto	
1965	FEC	(Australia) Peter Thomson (2)	278	−2	1 stroke	(New Zealand) Ross Newdick	
1964	FEC	(Taiwan) Hsieh Yung-yo (2)	269	−15	Playoff (Note: Hsieh won on the fourth hole of a sudden-death playoff.)	(Australia) Alan Murray	
1963	FEC	(Taiwan) Hsieh Yung-yo	272	−16	3 strokes	(Japan) Tomoo Ishii	
1962	FEC	(Australia) Len Woodward	271	−17	1 stroke	(Australia) Frank Phillips (Australia) Bill Dunk (Australia) Alan Murray	
1961		(Australia) Kel Nagle	261		6 strokes	(Australia) Peter Thomson	
1960		(Australia) Peter Thomson	272		10 strokes	(Australia) Kel Nagle	
1959		(Taiwan) Lu Liang-Huan	281		1 stroke	(Australia) Bruce Crampton (Australia) Kel Nagle	

== Scorecard ==
Hole	Name	Old Name	Yards	Metres	Par
1	Taipo	Trench	468	428	4
2	Sai Kung	The Trap	149	136	3
3	Shatin	Fearsome	551	504	5
4	Wong Tai Sin	Temptation	288	263	4
5	Kowloon City	Table Top	192	176	3
6	Kwun Tong	The Pimple	436	399	4
7	Eastern	The Narrows	380	347	4
8	Southern	Oasis	188	172	3
9	Wan Chai	The Bend	493	451	4
10	Central and Western	Holland	367	336	4
11	Yau Tsim Mong	The Paddy	466	426	4
12	Sham Shui Po	Short Hole	144	132	3
13	Kwai Tsing	The Long Hole	529	484	5
14	Tsuen Wan	The Bungalow	395	361	4
15	Islands	The Burn	426	390	4
16	Tuen Mun	The Road Hole	411	376	4
17	Yuen Long	The Graves	406	371	4
18	North	The Ultimate	410	375	4
Total			6710	6137	70

== See also ==
- Open golf tournament
