= Kenji Hosoishi =

Japanese professional golfer

Personal information
- Nationality: Japan
- Born: 25 March 1937 (age 89) Fukuoka Prefecture, Japan
- Height: 170 cm (5 ft 7 in)
- Weight: 90 kg (198 lb)

Career
- Sport: Golf
- Status: Professional
- Professional wins: 5

Kenji Hosoishi (born 25 March 1937) is a Japanese professional golfer. Hosoishi abruptly had much success at the age of 24; as an "unknown" he defeated a number of "top players" to win the Japan Open. In the late 1960s he had much success on the Asia Golf Circuit, winning the Indian Open in back-to-back years as well as the 1968 Malaysian Open. After his win in Malaysia the legendary Australian golfer Peter Thomson stated that he "is likely to emerge as the number one star on this tour." Hosoishi did not meet these expectations, however. Though he continued to play consistently on the leading Asian tours in the 1970s he did not win another significant event. By the mid-1980s he had largely retired from work as a touring professional.

== Early life ==
Hosoishi was born in Fukuoka Prefecture. Later he moved to Nagoya. He started playing golf at the age of 13. Hosoishi started his golf career as a caddy.

== Professional career ==
Hosoishi had some success early in his career. In 1961, he played the Japan Open held at Takanodai Country Club. Hosoishi played very well and had a chance to win in regulation. However his birdie putt on the final hole barely missed. He finished at 289 (+1). He entered a sudden-death playoff with Koichi Ono and Isao Katsumata, both of Japan, and Taiwan's Hsieh Yung-yo and Chen Ching-Po. On the third playoff hole, in "semi-darkness," his par won the championship. Hosoishi was considered an "unknown" at the time; his victory against these "top players" was a big surprise. Two years later he won the Chunichi Crowns.

As of 1966, he was playing tournaments on the Asia Golf Circuit. In March he finished in a tie for fifth at the Malayan Open. By April, he was in 12th place on the Order of Merit.

In 1967 he would have much success on the Asia Golf Circuit. He again played well at the Malaysian Open, finishing in a tie for eighth, three back of the champion. In April he played the Indian Open. He was seven shots back entering the final round. Hosoishi shot a final round 68, tying the lowest score of the tournament. He entered a sudden death play-off with England's Malcolm Gregson. On the third playoff hole Gregson hit his approach into a bunker and Hosoishi won the championship.

In 1968, he had many highlights. The first tournament he played of the season was the Philippine Open. He finished T-3. The following week, he finished T-2 at the Singapore Open. The next week, he played the Malaysian Open. He opened with a 69 (−3) to place himself in the top ten. During the second round he shot a bogey-free 66 (−6), tying the best round of the day. He held the midway lead with fellow Japanese Shigeru Uchida. In the third round, he shot a four-under-par 68. He held a three-stroke lead over Lu Liang-Huan. In the final round, however, Hososhi had a "shaky start." His main competitor, Lu, "began making up strokes." Within an hour of teeing off, however, Hosoishi settled down with excellent putting and chips shots. He finished at 271 (−17) to defeat Lu by four strokes. After the round, Peter Thomson wrote in The Age, "Hosoishi outplayed us all, and is likely to emerge as the number one star on this tour." Shortly after the victory he took the lead on the circuit's Order of Merit.

The following month, in April, he played the Indian Open in defense of his championship. Australian Stan Peach led by four over Hosoishi entering the final round. However, Hosoishi eagled the par-5 9th to cut the lead in half. On the back nine, Peach putted poorly to fall back. By the 14th hole, Hosoishi took the solo lead for the first time. Ultimately, he shot a final round 69 (−4) to defeat Peach by two. He finished at 285 (−7). He was the first player to win the tournament back-to-back. During this era, Hideyo Sugimoto was considered his only rival from Japan.

His good play over the course of the year earned him entry to a number of elite international events. In August, it was announced that he earned entry into the Alcan Golfer of the Year Championship at Royal Birkdale Golf Club in England. In October, he played the event. He finished in 21st place among 23 golfers. The following month, he played the Brazil Open. He finished joint runner-up to compatriot Takaaki Kono, five behind, tied for second with South Africa's Hugh Baiocchi. Later in the month, he represented Japan at the 1968 World Cup held in Rome, Italy.

Hosoishi would not follow up on this success. In the early 1970s, he often played well during the beginning of tournaments but failed to follow through on the weekend. In 1970, he was one back of Hsieh Yung-yo's lead entering the final round of the Singapore Open. However, he shot a final round 72 (+1) to finish five back, in a tie for sixth. The following week, he established a "scorching pace" at the Malaysian Open, shooting a bogey-free 65 (−7) to take the solo lead. However, he shot a second round 76 (+4) and was not in contention thereafter. He finished in a tie for 31st. The following year, in 1971, he again played excellently during the beginning of the Singapore Open. He opened with a bogey-free 67 (−4), holding the joint lead. He remained in serious contention entering the final round, just one back. However, he shot a final round 74 and finished six back, in a tie for eighth. Later in the year, he opened with the joint lead at the Japan Airlines Open. However, he was not near the lead as the tournament concluded.

Hosoishi did not record many highlights for the remainder of his career. He continued to play on the main Asian golf tours, however. As of the mid-1970s he was stilling playing on the Asia Golf Circuit. He also played on the Japan Golf Tour through the mid-1980s.

== Professional wins (5) ==
=== Asia Golf Circuit wins (1) ===
No.	Date	Tournament	Winning score	Margin of victory	Runner-up
1	10 Mar 1968	Malaysian Open	−17 (69-66-68-68=271)	4 strokes	(Taiwan) Lu Liang-Huan

=== Other wins (4) ===
- 1961 Japan Open Golf Championship
- 1963 Chunichi Crowns
- 1967 Indian Open (Asia Golf Circuit "associate event")
- 1968 Indian Open (Asia Golf Circuit "associate event")

== Team appearances ==
- World Cup (representing Japan): 1968
