= Japan Open Golf Championship =

Coordinates: 33.7255°N 130.4557°E

Tournament information
- Location: Kōka, Shiga, Japan
- Established: 1927
- Course: Tarao Country Club
- Organized by: Japan Golf Association
- Tour: Japan Golf Tour
- Format: Stroke play
- Prize fund: ¥210,000,000
- Month played: October

Tournament record score
- Aggregate: 265 Shaun Norris (2021)
- To par: −19 as above

Current champion
- (Japan) Yusaku Hosono

Location map
- Location within Japan Location within Shiga Prefecture

The Japan Open Golf Championship (日本オープンゴルフ選手権競技, Nihon ōpun gorufu senshu kenkyōgi) is Japan's national open golf championship. Founded in 1927, it is one of the oldest professional golf tournaments in Japan.

The Japan Open is one of the three richest tournaments on the Japan Golf Tour, with a prize fund of ¥210 million in 2022. Between 1992 and 2021 it was the tour's designated "Flagship event" for the purposes of the Official World Golf Ranking, with a minimum winner's points allocation of 32 points.

The winner also receives an invitation to the following year's Open Championship. Starting with the 2025 tournament, the winner also earned entry into the Masters Tournament.

== Winners ==
Year	Winner	Score	To par	Margin of victory	Runner(s)-up	Winner's share (¥)	Venue
2026	(Japan) Yusaku Hosono	267	−13	2 strokes	(Japan) Yusuke Sakamoto	42,000,000	Tarao
2025	(Japan) Naoyuki Kataoka	277	−3	Playoff	(Japan) Satoshi Hara	42,000,000	Nikko
2024	(Japan) Shugo Imahira	276	−4	1 stroke	(Japan) Ryosuke Kinoshita	42,000,000	Tokyo
2023	(Japan) Aguri Iwasaki	272	−8	2 strokes	(Japan) Ryo Ishikawa	42,000,000	Ibaraki (West)
2022	(Japan) Taiga Semikawa (a)	270	−10	2 strokes	(Japan) Kazuki Higa	42,000,000	Sanko
2021	(South Africa) Shaun Norris	265	−19	4 strokes	(Japan) Yuta Ikeda	42,000,000	Biwako
2020	(Japan) Yuki Inamori (2)	275	−5	1 stroke	(Japan) Hideto Tanihara	31,500,000	Murasaki (Sumire)
2019	(United States) Chan Kim	285	+1	1 stroke	(Japan) Mikumu Horikawa (South Africa) Shaun Norris	42,000,000	Koga
2018	(Japan) Yuki Inamori	270	−14	2 strokes	(South Africa) Shaun Norris	40,000,000	Yokohama (West)
2017	(Japan) Yuta Ikeda (2)	272	−8	1 stroke	(Japan) Takumi Kanaya (a)	40,000,000	Gifuseki
2016	(Japan) Hideki Matsuyama	275	−5	3 strokes	(Japan) Yuta Ikeda (South Korea) Lee Kyoung-hoon	40,000,000	Sayama
2015	(Japan) Satoshi Kodaira	275	−13	1 stroke	(Japan) Yuta Ikeda	40,000,000	Rokko Kokusai (East)
2014	(Japan) Yuta Ikeda	270	−10	1 stroke	(Japan) Shingo Katayama (Japan) Satoshi Kodaira	40,000,000	Chiba (Umesato)
2013	(Japan) Masanori Kobayashi	274	−10	3 strokes	(Japan) Koumei Oda	40,000,000	Ibaraki (East)
2012	(Japan) Kenichi Kuboya	292	+8	1 stroke	(Philippines) Juvic Pagunsan	40,000,000	Naha
2011	(South Korea) Bae Sang-moon	282	−2	Playoff	(Japan) Kenichi Kuboya	40,000,000	Takanodai
2010	(South Korea) Kim Kyung-tae	271	−13	1 stroke	(Japan) Hiroyuki Fujita	40,000,000	Aichi
2009	(Japan) Ryuichi Oda	282	−6	Playoff	(Japan) Yasuharu Imano (Japan) Ryo Ishikawa	40,000,000	Musashi (Toyooka)
2008	(Japan) Shingo Katayama (2)	283	−1	4 strokes	(Japan) Ryo Ishikawa	40,000,000	Koga
2007	(Japan) Toru Taniguchi (2)	283	−5	2 strokes	(Japan) Shingo Katayama	40,000,000	Sagamihara (East)
2006	(Australia) Paul Sheehan	277	−7	3 strokes	(Japan) Azuma Yano	40,000,000	Kasumigaseki (West)
2005	(Japan) Shingo Katayama	282	−2	2 strokes	(Japan) Ryoken Kawagishi (Australia) Craig Parry	24,000,000	Hirono
2004	(Japan) Toru Taniguchi	285	−3	4 strokes	(Japan) Toshimitsu Izawa (New Zealand) David Smail (Taiwan) Yeh Wei-tze	24,000,000	Katayamazu (Hakusan)
2003	(Japan) Keiichiro Fukabori	276	−8	2 strokes	(Japan) Yasuharu Imano	24,000,000	Nikko
2002	(New Zealand) David Smail	271	−9	4 strokes	(South Korea) Kim Jong-duck	24,000,000	Shimonoseki
2001	(Japan) Taichi Teshima	277	−7	4 strokes	(Japan) Tsuyoshi Yoneyama	24,000,000	Tokyo
2000	(Japan) Naomichi Ozaki (2)	281	−3	1 stroke	(Taiwan) Lin Keng-chi	24,000,000	Takanodai
1999	(Japan) Naomichi Ozaki	298	+10	2 strokes	(Japan) Kazuhiko Hosokawa (Japan) Nobumitsu Yuhara	24,000,000	Otaru
1998	(Japan) Hidemichi Tanaka	283	−5	1 stroke	(Japan) Naomichi Ozaki	24,000,000	Oarai
1997	(Australia) Craig Parry	286	+2	1 stroke	(Philippines) Frankie Miñoza (Japan) Seiki Okuda (Japan) Masashi Ozaki	24,000,000	Koga
1996	(United States) Peter Teravainen	282	−2	2 strokes	(Philippines) Frankie Miñoza	24,000,000	Ibaraki (West)
1995	(Japan) Toshimitsu Izawa	277	−7	1 stroke	(Japan) Kazuhiko Hosokawa	16,200,000	Kasumigaseki (East)
1994	(Japan) Masashi Ozaki (5)	270	−18	13 strokes	(United States) David Ishii (Japan) Hideki Kase	18,000,000	Yokkaichi
1993	(Japan) Seiki Okuda	281	−3	5 strokes	(Japan) Masashi Ozaki	18,000,000	Biwako
1992	(Japan) Masashi Ozaki (4)	277	−11	5 strokes	(Canada) Brent Franklin (Japan) Masahiro Kuramoto	18,000,000	Ryugasaki
1991	(Japan) Tsuneyuki Nakajima (4)	290	+2	Playoff	(Japan) Noboru Sugai	18,000,000	Shimonoseki
1990	(Japan) Tsuneyuki Nakajima (3)	281	−7	2 strokes	(Japan) Masashi Ozaki	18,000,000	Otaru
1989	(Japan) Masashi Ozaki (3)	274	−6	1 stroke	(Australia) Brian Jones	10,000,000	Nagoya (Wago)
1988	(Japan) Masashi Ozaki (2)	288	+4	1 stroke	(Japan) Isao Aoki (Japan) Tsuneyuki Nakajima	10,000,000	Tokyo
1987	(Japan) Isao Aoki (2)	279	−9	1 stroke	(Japan) Tsuneyuki Nakajima (Japan) Nobuo Serizawa	10,000,000	Arima Royal
1986	(Japan) Tsuneyuki Nakajima (2)	284	−4	1 stroke	(Japan) Isao Aoki (Japan) Masashi Ozaki	10,000,000	Totsuka (West)
1985	(Japan) Tsuneyuki Nakajima	285	−3	2 strokes	(Japan) Hiroshi Makino	10,000,000	Higashinagoya
1984	(Japan) Koichi Uehara	283	−5	2 strokes	(Japan) Koichi Suzuki	10,000,000	Ranzan
1983	(Japan) Isao Aoki	281	−7	Playoff	(Australia) Terry Gale	8,000,000	Rokko Kokusai
1982	(Japan) Akira Yabe	277	−7	5 strokes	(Japan) Yutaka Hagawa (Japan) Naomichi Ozaki	8,000,000	Musashi (Toyooka)
1981	(Japan) Yutaka Hagawa	280	E	1 stroke	(Japan) Kenji Mori (Japan) Tsuneyuki Nakajima	8,000,000	Nihon Line
1980	(Japan) Shoji Kikuchi	296	E	1 stroke	(Japan) Isao Aoki (Japan) Kazuo Yoshikawa	8,000,000	Sagamihara (East)
1979	(Taiwan) Kuo Chie-Hsiung	285	−3	Playoff	(Japan) Isao Aoki (Japan) Koichi Uehara (Japan) Yoshitaka Yamamoto	8,000,000	Hino
1978	(Spain) Seve Ballesteros (2)	281	−7	Playoff	(Australia) Graham Marsh	10,000,000	Yokohama (West)
1977	(Spain) Seve Ballesteros	284	E	1 stroke	(Japan) Takashi Murakami	10,000,000	Narashino
1976	(Japan) Kosaku Shimada	288	−4	1 stroke	(Japan) Tōru Nakamura (Japan) Takashi Murakami	10,000,000	Central (East)
1975	(Japan) Takashi Murakami	278	−10	3 strokes	(Japan) Seiichi Kanai	8,000,000	Kasugai (East)
1974	(Japan) Masashi Ozaki	279	−13	1 stroke	(Japan) Takashi Murakami	6,000,000	Central (East)
1973	(Philippines) Ben Arda	278	−10	2 strokes	(Japan) Isao Aoki	4,500,000	Ibaraki (West)
1972	(South Korea) Han Chang-sang	278		1 stroke	(Japan) Masashi Ozaki		Otone (East)
1971	(Japan) Yoshimasa Fujii	282		Playoff	(Japan) Hideyo Sugimoto		Aichi
1970	(Japan) Mitsuhiro Kitta	282		1 stroke	(Japan) Isao Aoki		Musashi (Sasai)
1969	(Japan) Hideyo Sugimoto (2)	284		1 stroke	(Japan) Shigeru Uchida		Ono
1968	(Japan) Takaaki Kono	284		1 stroke	(Japan) Kikuo Arai (Australia) Bruce Devlin (Japan) Namio Takasu		Sobu (East & Middle)
1967	(Japan) Tadashi Kitta	282		3 strokes	(Japan) Tomoo Ishii (Japan) Teruo Sugihara		Hirono
1966	(Japan) Seiichi Sato	285		1 stroke	(Taiwan) Chen Ching-Po (Japan) Tadashi Kitta (Japan) Shozo Miyamoto		Sodegaura
1965	(Japan) Tadashi Kitta	284		1 stroke	(Japan) Seiji Kumada (Japan) Shigeru Uchida (Japan) Kenji Unno		Miyoshi
1964	(Japan) Hideyo Sugimoto	288		1 stroke	(Taiwan) Chen Ching-Po (Japan) Kokuni Kimoto		Tokyo
1963	(Japan) Toichiro Toda (2)	283		2 strokes	(Japan) Teruo Sugihara		Yokkaichi
1962	(Japan) Teruo Sugihara	287		2 strokes	(Taiwan) Chen Ching-Po		Chiba (Umesato)
1961	(Japan) Kenji Hosoishi	289		Playoff	(Taiwan) Chen Ching-Po (Taiwan) Hsieh Yung-yo (Japan) Isao Katsumata (Japan) Koichi Ono (Note: Son Shi-Kin changed his name to Koichi Ono in 1954 or 1955.)		Takanodai
1960	(Japan) Haruyoshi Kobari (Note: Defending champion Chen Ching-Po finished ahead of Kobari but was disqualified after signing for an incorrect score.) (2)	294		5 strokes	(Japan) Yoshimasa Fujii (United States) Orville Moody (Japan) Shiro Matsuda (Japan) Koichi Ono		Hirono
1959	(Taiwan) Chen Ching-Po	296		Playoff	(Japan) Yumasa Shimamura		Sagamihara
1958	(Japan) Torakichi Nakamura (3)	288		4 strokes	(Japan) Yoshiro Hayashi		Takanodai
1957	(Japan) Haruyoshi Kobari	288		6 strokes	(Japan) Tomoo Ishii		Aichi
1956	(Japan) Torakichi Nakamura (2)	285		8 strokes	(Japan) Haruyoshi Kobari		Kasumigaseki (West)
1955	(Japan) Koichi Ono (3)	291		5 strokes	(Taiwan) Chin Sei-Sui		Hirono
1954	(Japan) Yoshiro Hayashi (2)	293		3 strokes	(Japan) Michio Ishii (Japan) Haruyoshi Kobari		Tokyo
1953	(Japan) Son Shi-Kin (2)	291		1 stroke	(Japan) Torakichi Nakamura		Takarazuka
1952	(Japan) Torakichi Nakamura	279		11 strokes	(Japan) Shigeru Ishii		Kawana Hotel (Fuji)
1951	(Japan) Son Shi-Kin	288		3 strokes	(Japan) Koshio Kurihara		Naruo
1950	(Japan) Yoshiro Hayashi	288		1 stroke	(Japan) Yumasa Shimamura		Abiko
1942–1949: No tournament due to World War II
1941	(Japan) Tokuharu Nobuhara	290		3 strokes	(Japan) Torakichi Nakamura		Hodogaya
1940	(Japan) Tomekichi Miyamoto (6)	285		2 strokes	(Japan) Toichiro Toda		Tokyo (Asaka)
1939	(Japan) Toichiro Toda	287		5 strokes	(Taiwan) Chin Sei-Sui		Hirono
1938	(Taiwan) Rin Man-Puku	294		3 strokes	(Japan) Toichiro Toda		Fujisawa
1937	(Taiwan) Chin Sei-Sui	284		7 strokes	(Japan) Rokuzo Asami		Sagami
1936	(Japan) Tomekichi Miyamoto (5)	293		1 stroke	(Taiwan) Chin Sei-Sui		Naruo
1935	(Japan) Tomekichi Miyamoto (4)	296		8 strokes	(Japan) Toichiro Toda		Tokyo (Asaka)
1934	No tournament due to flood damage						
1933	(Japan) Kanekichi Nakamura	294		9 strokes	(Taiwan) Chin Sei-Sui (Philippines) Larry Montes		Kasumigaseki (East)
1932	(Japan) Tomekichi Miyamoto (3)	298		1 stroke	(Japan) Akira Muraki		Ibaraki
1931	(Japan) Rokuzo Asami (2)	281		4 strokes	(Japan) Tomekichi Miyamoto		Hodogaya
1930	(Japan) Tomekichi Miyamoto (2)	287		19 strokes	(Japan) Kokichi Yasuda		Ibaraki
1929	(Japan) Tomekichi Miyamoto	298		2 strokes	(Japan) Kokichi Yasuda		Ibaraki
1928	(Japan) Rokuzo Asami	301		7 strokes	(Japan) Kokichi Yasuda		Tokyo (Komazawa)
1927	(Japan) Rokuro Akahoshi	309		10 strokes	(Japan) Rokuzo Asami		Hodogaya

== Future venues ==
- 2026：Tarao Country Club (West Course), Kouga City, Shiga
- 2027：Boso Country Club Boso Golf Course (East Course), Mutsuzawa Town, Chosei District, Chiba Prifecture

== See also ==
- Open golf tournament
