= Malaysian Open (golf) =

Golf tournament

Coordinates: 3.00°N 101.53°E

IRS Prima Malaysian Open
Tournament information
- Location: Seri Kembangan, Malaysia
- Established: 1962
- Courses: The Mines Resort & Golf Club
- Par: 72
- Length: 7,016 yards (6,415 m)
- Tours: European Tour; Asian Tour; Asia Golf Circuit
- Format: Stroke play
- Prize fund: US$1,000,000
- Month played: February

Tournament record score
- Aggregate: 260 Arjun Atwal (2003)
- To par: −24 as above

Current champion
- (Spain) David Puig

Final champion
- Location in Malaysia

The Malaysian Open is a men's professional golf tournament that is currently played on the Asian Tour, and was formerly played on the European Tour.

Notable past winners include world number one golfers Vijay Singh and Lee Westwood (both players winning the event on two occasions). Other notable winners include 17-year-old Italian Matteo Manassero in 2011 as well as former Open champion Louis Oosthuizen the following year. PGA Tour winners including Harold Henning, Jeff Maggert, Glen Day, Steve Flesch, Arjun Atwal and Noh Seung-yul have also won the event. Since its inauguration there has never been a Malaysian winner.

== History ==
The tournament was inaugurated in 1962 as the Malayan Open, and was one of the events on the first season of the Far East Circuit that year. In 1999, it joined the Asian Tour and also became part of the European Tour's expansion into Asia as a jointly sanctioned event.

The six events from 2010 to 2015 were held at the Kuala Lumpur Golf & Country Club. The 2015 champion was India's Anirban Lahiri. This was his first ever victory on the European Tour and it was his sixth win on the Asian Tour.

The tournament returned in 2020 after a four year hiatus. It was played as a sole-sanctioned Asian Tour event at Kota Permai Golf & Country Club. The prize fund was US$1,000,000. Trevor Simsby took the title in a playoff over Andrew Dodt and Jarin Todd. It was the final event played before the 2020–21–22 Asian Tour season was heavily disrupted by the COVID-19 pandemic.

== Winners ==
Year	Tour(s) (Note: AGC/FEC − Asia Golf Circuit/Far East Circuit; ASA − Asian Tour; EUR − European Tour.)	Winner	Score	To par	Margin of victory	Runner(s)-up	Venue	Ref.
IRS Prima Malaysian Open
2024	ASA	(Spain) David Puig	261	−23	2 strokes	(South Korea) Wang Jeung-hun	The Mines	
2021–2023: No tournament
Bandar Malaysia Open
2020	ASA	(United States) Trevor Simsby	203 (Note: Shortened to 54 holes due to weather.)	−13	Playoff (Note: Simsby won with a birdie at the second hole of a sudden-death playoff. Todd was eliminated by a birdie at the first hole.)	(Australia) Andrew Dodt (United States) Jarin Todd	Kota Permai	
2016–2019: No tournament
Maybank Malaysian Open
2015	ASA, EUR	(India) Anirban Lahiri	272	−16	1 stroke	(Austria) Bernd Wiesberger	Kuala Lumpur	
2014	ASA, EUR	(England) Lee Westwood (2)	270	−18	7 strokes	(Belgium) Nicolas Colsaerts (South Africa) Louis Oosthuizen (Austria) Bernd Wiesberger	Kuala Lumpur	
2013	ASA, EUR	(Thailand) Kiradech Aphibarnrat	203	−13	1 stroke	(Italy) Edoardo Molinari	Kuala Lumpur	
2012	ASA, EUR	(South Africa) Louis Oosthuizen	271	−17	3 strokes	(Scotland) Stephen Gallacher	Kuala Lumpur	
2011	ASA, EUR	(Italy) Matteo Manassero	272	−16	1 stroke	(France) Grégory Bourdy	Kuala Lumpur	
2010	ASA, EUR	(South Korea) Noh Seung-yul	274	−14	1 stroke	(South Korea) K. J. Choi	Kuala Lumpur	
2009	ASA, EUR	(United States) Anthony Kang	271	−17	1 stroke	(England) David Horsey (Thailand) Prayad Marksaeng (India) Jyoti Randhawa (England) Miles Tunnicliff	Saujana	
2008	ASA, EUR	(India) Arjun Atwal (2)	270	−18	Playoff (Note: Atwal won with a par at the second hole of a sudden-death playoff.)	(Sweden) Peter Hedblom	Kota Permai	
2007	ASA, EUR	(Sweden) Peter Hedblom	280	−8	1 stroke	(France) Jean-François Lucquin	Saujana	
2006	ASA, EUR	(South Korea) Charlie Wi	197	−19	1 stroke	(Thailand) Thongchai Jaidee	Kuala Lumpur	
Carlsberg Malaysian Open
2005	ASA, EUR	(Thailand) Thongchai Jaidee (2)	267	−21	3 strokes	(India) Jyoti Randhawa	Saujana	
2004	ASA, EUR	(Thailand) Thongchai Jaidee	274	−14	2 strokes	(Australia) Brad Kennedy	Saujana	
2003	ASA, EUR	(India) Arjun Atwal	260	−24	4 strokes	(South Africa) Retief Goosen (Australia) Brad Kennedy	The Mines Resort	
2002	ASA, EUR	(Scotland) Alastair Forsyth	267	−17	Playoff (Note: Forsyth won with a birdie at the second hole of a sudden-death playoff.)	(Australia) Stephen Leaney	Royal Selangor	
2001	ASA, EUR	(Fiji) Vijay Singh (2)	274	−14	Playoff (Note: Singh won with a birdie at the third hole of a sudden-death playoff.)	(Republic of Ireland) Pádraig Harrington	Saujana	
Benson & Hedges Malaysian Open
2000	ASA, EUR	(Taiwan) Yeh Wei-tze	278	−10	1 stroke	(United States) Craig Hainline (Republic of Ireland) Pádraig Harrington (South Africa) Des Terblanche	Templer Park	
1999	ASA, EUR	(United States) Gerry Norquist (2)	280	−8	3 strokes	(Germany) Alex Čejka (United States) Bob May	Saujana	
1998	AGC	(England) Ed Fryatt	278	−10	Playoff (Note: Fryatt won with a par on the second hole of a sudden-death playoff.)	(England) Lee Westwood	Saujana	
1997	AGC	(England) Lee Westwood	274	−14	2 strokes	(United States) Larry Barber	Saujana	
1996	AGC	(United States) Steve Flesch	282	−6	Playoff (Note: Flesch won with a par on the second hole of a sudden-death playoff.)	(Australia) Craig Jones	Templer Park	
1995	AGC	(United States) Clay Devers	276	−12	1 stroke	(Sweden) Daniel Chopra (Northern Ireland) Darren Clarke (United States) Kevin Wentworth	Templer Park	
1994	AGC	(Sweden) Joakim Haeggman	279	−9	Playoff (Note: Haeggman won on the eighth hole of a sudden-death playoff. Nobilo was eliminated on the sixth hole.)	(New Zealand) Frank Nobilo (Malaysia) Periasamy Gunasegaran	Royal Selangor	
1993	AGC	(United States) Gerry Norquist	276	−12	1 stroke	(Fiji) Vijay Singh	Royal Selangor	
1992	AGC	(Fiji) Vijay Singh	275	−9	3 strokes	(Taiwan) Hsieh Chin-sheng (Australia) Brad King (United States) Craig McClellan (Sri Lanka) Nandasena Perera (United States) Lee Porter	Bukit Jambul	
1991	AGC	(Canada) Rick Gibson	277	−11	1 stroke	(Taiwan) Chen Liang-hsi	Subang National	
1990	AGC	(United States) Glen Day	273	−15	4 strokes	(Taiwan) Chen Liang-hsi (Canada) Danny Mijovic	Royal Perak	
1989	AGC	(United States) Jeff Maggert	283	−5	5 strokes	(United States) Greg Bruckner (United States) Bob Lendzion (United States) Craig McClellan (United States) Casey Nakama	Ayer Keroh	
1988	AGC	(United States) Tray Tyner	288	E	1 stroke	(Japan) Harumitsu Hamano (Taiwan) Hsieh Chin-sheng	Saujana	
1987	AGC	(Australia) Terry Gale (3)	280	−8	Playoff (Note: Gale won with a birdie on the first hole of a sudden-death playoff.)	(United States) Greg Twiggs	Subang National	
1986	AGC	(Australia) Stewart Ginn (2)	276	−8	1 stroke	(Australia) Brian Jones	Royal Selangor	
1985	AGC	(Australia) Terry Gale (2)	270	−14	7 strokes	(Taiwan) Chen Tze-chung	Royal Selangor	
1984	AGC	(Taiwan) Lu Chien-soon	275	−9	2 strokes	(Australia) Terry Gale (Scotland) Sam Torrance	Royal Selangor	
1983	AGC	(Australia) Terry Gale	279	−9	2 strokes	(United States) Jay Cudd	Subang National	
Malaysian Open
1982	AGC	(United States) Denny Hepler	208 (Note: Shortened to 54 holes after the first round was controversially abandoned with over half the field having completed their round.)	−5	Playoff (Note: Hepler won with a birdie on the second hole of a sudden-death playoff.)	(Taiwan) Hsieh Min-Nan (United States) David Ogrin	Royal Selangor	
1981	AGC	(Taiwan) Lu Hsi-chuen (2)	276	−9	1 stroke	(Taiwan) Ho Ming-chung	Royal Selangor (Note: First two rounds on the East and West courses, and the final two rounds on the Old course.)	
1980	AGC	Mark McNulty	270	−15	9 strokes	(Taiwan) Tsao Chien-teng	Royal Selangor	
1979	AGC	(Taiwan) Lu Hsi-chuen	277	−11	7 strokes	(Taiwan) Chen Chien-chin (Japan) Tsutomu Irie (United States) Ron Milanovich	Royal Selangor	
1978	AGC	(Australia) Brian Jones	276	−12	6 strokes	(Philippines) Ben Arda (Australia) Stewart Ginn (United States) Mike Krantz	Royal Selangor (Note: First two rounds on the New course and the final two rounds on the Old course.)	
1977	AGC	(Australia) Stewart Ginn	276	−12	1 stroke	(Japan) Katsunari Takahashi	Royal Selangor	
1976	AGC	(Taiwan) Hsu Sheng-san	279	−9	Playoff (Note: Hsu won with a par on the third hole of a sudden-death playoff.)	(Myanmar) Mya Aye	Royal Selangor	
1975	AGC	(Australia) Graham Marsh (2)	276	−12	2 strokes	(Taiwan) Hsieh Min-Nan	Royal Selangor	
1974	AGC	(Australia) Graham Marsh	278	−10	1 stroke	(United States) Wally Kuchar	Perak Turf Club	
1973	AGC	(Japan) Hideyo Sugimoto	277	−11	2 strokes	(Australia) Graham Marsh	Royal Selangor	
1972	AGC	(Japan) Takashi Murakami	276	−12	1 stroke	(United States) Marty Bohen (New Zealand) Walter Godfrey (Thailand) Sukree Onsham	Royal Selangor	
1971	AGC	(Japan) Takaaki Kono (2)	269	−19	2 strokes	(Australia) David Graham	Royal Selangor	
1970	AGC	(Philippines) Ben Arda	273	−15	1 stroke	(Australia) Tim Woolbank	Royal Selangor	
1969	AGC	(Japan) Takaaki Kono	280	−8	1 stroke	(Australia) David Graham (New Zealand) John Lister	Royal Selangor	
1968	AGC	(Japan) Kenji Hosoishi	271	−17	4 strokes	(Taiwan) Lu Liang-Huan	Royal Selangor	
1967	FEC	(Philippines) Ireneo Legaspi	286	−2	1 stroke	(Japan) Toshiaki Sekimizu (England) Guy Wolstenholme (Japan) Haruo Yasuda	Royal Selangor	
Malayan Open
1966	FEC	(South Africa) Harold Henning	278	−10	3 strokes	(Australia) Peter Thomson	Royal Selangor	
1965	FEC	(Japan) Tomoo Ishii (2)	282	−10	2 strokes	(Taiwan) Lu Liang-Huan (England) Guy Wolstenholme	Royal Selangor	
1964	FEC	(Japan) Tomoo Ishii	282	−14	1 stroke	(Wales) Brian Huggett (Japan) Tadashi Kitta	Royal Selangor	
1963	FEC	(Australia) Bill Dunk	276	−20	4 strokes	(Japan) Tadashi Kitta (Taiwan) Hsieh Yung-yo	Royal Selangor	
1962	FEC	(Australia) Frank Phillips	276	−20	1 stroke	(New Zealand) Bob Charles (Australia) Peter Thomson	Royal Selangor	

== See also ==
- Open golf tournament
