= 1963 Far East Circuit =

Golf tour season

1963 Far East Circuit season
- Duration: 14 February 1963 – 25 March 1963
- Number of official events: 5 (Note: One further tournament was scheduled but was cancelled.)
- Order of Merit: (Australia) Kel Nagle

The 1963 Far East Circuit was the second season of the Far East Circuit, the main professional golf tour in Asia since it was established in 1961.

== Schedule ==
The following table lists official events during the 1963 season.

Date	Tournament	Host country	Purse (US$)	Winner (Note: The number in brackets after each winner's name is the number of Far East Circuit events they had won up to and including that tournament. This information is only shown for Far East Circuit members.)	Notes
17 Feb	Philippine Open	Philippines	MS$30,000	(Philippines) Ben Arda (1)	
24 Feb	Singapore Open	Singapore	11,300	(South Africa) Alan Brookes (1)	
3 Mar	Malayan Open	Malaya	£A4,375	(Australia) Bill Dunk (1)	
10 Mar	Hong Kong Open	Hong Kong	11,500	(Taiwan) Hsieh Yung-yo (1)	
~~17 Mar~~	Osaka Open	Japan	–	Cancelled	New tournament
25 Mar	Yomiuri International	Japan	15,000	(United States) Doug Sanders (n/a)	

== Order of Merit ==
The Order of Merit was based on tournament results during the season, calculated using a points-based system.

Position	Player	Points
1	(Australia) Kel Nagle	73
2	(Taiwan) Hsieh Yung-yo	62
3	(Australia) Alan Murray	61
4	(Japan) Tomoo Ishii	60
