= 1965 Far East Circuit =

Golf tour season

1965 Far East Circuit season
- Duration: 25 February 1965 – 4 April 1965
- Number of official events: 6
- Most wins: (Australia) Frank Phillips (2)
- Order of Merit: (Taiwan) Hsieh Yung-yo

The 1965 Far East Circuit was the fourth season of the Far East Circuit, the main professional golf tour in Asia since it was established in 1961.

== Schedule ==
The following table lists official events during the 1965 season.

Date	Tournament	Host country	Purse (US$)	Winner (Note: The number in brackets after each winner's name is the number of Far East Circuit events they had won up to and including that tournament. This information is only shown for Far East Circuit members.)	Notes
28 Feb	Philippine Open	Philippines	17,500	(Taiwan) Lu Liang-Huan (1)	
7 Mar	Singapore Open	Singapore	MS$40,000	(Australia) Frank Phillips (2)	
14 Mar	Malayan Open	Malaya	MS$40,000	(Japan) Tomoo Ishii (3)	
21 Mar	Thailand Open	Thailand	10,000	(Taiwan) Hsieh Yung-yo (3)	New tournament
28 Mar	Hong Kong Open	Hong Kong	10,000	(Australia) Peter Thomson (3)	
4 Apr	Yomiuri International	Japan	15,000	(Australia) Frank Phillips (3)	

== Order of Merit ==
The Order of Merit was based on tournament results during the season, calculated using a points-based system.

Position	Player	Points
1	(Taiwan) Hsieh Yung-yo	85
2	(Australia) Frank Phillips	75
3	(Japan) Tadashi Kitta	65
4	(Japan) Hideyo Sugimoto	64
5	(Japan) Tomoo Ishii	63.5
