= Yomiuri =

Yomiuri may refer to:

- Yomiuri Giants, a professional baseball team based in Tokyo, Japan
- Yomiuri Nippon Symphony Orchestra, based in Tokyo, Japan
- Yomiuri Open, a golf tournament on the Japan Golf Tour until 2006
- Yomiuri International, a golf tournament on the Far East/Asian Circuit from 1962 to 1971
- Yomiuri Pro Championship, an invitational golf tournament held from 1952 to 1961
- Yomiuri Shimbun, a conservative Japanese newspaper
- Yomiuri Telecasting Corporation, a Japanese television network
- Yomiuri FC, one of the former names of Tokyo Verdy, a Japanese football club.
