= Rolex Golf Classic =

Tournament information
- Location: Kawasaki, Kanagawa, Japan
- Established: 1968
- Course: Kawasaki Kokusai Country Club
- Format: Stroke play
- Final year: 1973

Final champion
- (Japan) Sadao Hiyoshi
- Location in Japan Location in Kanagawa Prefecture

The Arnold Palmer Cup—Rolex Golf Classic was a limited field invitational professional golf tournament in Japan from 1968 to 1973. The players gained entry to the tournament via a poll of golf fans, with former winners and a big-name international player also receiving an invitation. It was held at Kawasaki Kokusai Country Club near Kawasaki in Kanagawa Prefecture apart from 1969 when the host venue has been the Tokyo Yumiuri Country Club.

== Winners ==
Year	Winner	Score	To par	Margin of victory	Runner(s)-up	Ref
1973	(Japan) Sadao Hiyoshi	138	−6	Playoff	(Japan) Isao Aoki	
1972	(Japan) Kenji Mori	139	−5	1 stroke	(Japan) Tadashi Kitta	
1971	(Japan) Tadashi Kitta	142	−2	1 stroke	(Japan) Kenji Mori (United States) Arnold Palmer (Japan) Namio Takasu (Japan) Akira Yabe	
1970	(Japan) Takaaki Kono	138	−6	1 stroke	(Japan) Teruo Sugihara	
1969	(Japan) Hideyo Sugimoto	140	-4	Playoff	(Japan) Tomoo Ishii	
1968	(Japan) Takashi Murakami	137	-5	3 strokes	(Japan) Mitsutaka Kono (Japan) Fujio Ishii	
