= 1969 Asia Golf Circuit =

Golf tour season

1969 Asia Golf Circuit season
- Duration: 27 February 1969 – 13 April 1969
- Number of official events: 7
- Order of Merit: (Taiwan) Hsieh Yung-yo

The 1969 Asia Golf Circuit was the eighth season of the Asia Golf Circuit (formerly the Far East Circuit), the main professional golf tour in Asia since it was established in 1961.

== Schedule ==
The following table lists official events during the 1969 season.

Date	Tournament	Host country	Purse (US$)	Winner (Note: The number in brackets after each winner's name is the number of Asia Golf Circuit events they had won up to and including that tournament. This information is only shown for Asia Golf Circuit members.)	Notes
2 Mar	Philippine Open	Philippines	10,000	(Japan) Haruo Yasuda (1)	
9 Mar	Singapore Open	Singapore	10,000	(Japan) Tomio Kamata (1)	
16 Mar	Malaysian Open	Malaysia	15,000	(Japan) Takaaki Kono (1)	
23 Mar	Thailand Open	Thailand	12,000	(Taiwan) Hsieh Yung-yo (7)	
30 Mar	Hong Kong Open	Hong Kong	16,500	(Japan) Teruo Sugihara (1)	
6 Apr	Taiwan Open	Taiwan	10,000	(Japan) Hideyo Sugimoto (1)	
13 Apr	Yomiuri International	Japan	15,000	(England) Guy Wolstenholme (1)	

=== Unofficial events ===
The following events were sanctioned by the Asia Golf Circuit, but did not carry official money, nor were wins official.

Date	Tournament	Host country	Purse ($)	Winner	Notes
20 Apr	Indian Open	India		(Philippines) Ben Arda	

== Order of Merit ==
The Order of Merit was based on tournament results during the season, calculated using a points-based system.

Position	Player	Points
1	(Taiwan) Hsieh Yung-yo	89
2	(England) Guy Wolstenholme	62
3	(Taiwan) Hsu Chi-san	58
T4	(Australia) David Graham	
T4	(Taiwan) Kuo Chie-Hsiung	
