= Yoshiro Hayashi =

Yoshiro Hayashi may refer to:

- Yoshiro Hayashi (golfer) (林 由郎, 1922–2012), Japanese golfer
- Yoshiro Hayashi (politician) (林 義郎, 1927–2017), Japanese politician
