= Yomiuri Pro Championship =

Golf tournament

The Yomiuri Professional Championship was a golf tournament that was held in Japan from 1952 to 1961. It was sponsored by the Yomiuri Shimbun newspaper.

The tournament was largely restricted to the top 30 finishers of the most recent Japan Open, however sponsors invitations were occasionally given out to international stars. In 1958 Americans Ken Venturi and Jack Burke Jr. received invitations, with Burke going on to win the tournament. Three years later defending Open Championship winner Arnold Palmer and defending Masters champion Gary Player were given sponsors invites, with Player going on to win.

In 1962, sponsors ended the Yomiuri Professional Championship, and founded the Yomiuri International as the Japan stop on the new Far East Circuit (later the Asian Circuit).

== Winners ==
- 1961 Gary Player
- 1960 Tadashi Kitta
- 1959 Yousei Shimamura
- 1958 Jack Burke Jr.
- 1957 Koichi Ono
- 1956Torakichi Nakamura
- 1955 Yoshiro Hayashi
- 1954 Kashio Kurihara
- 1953 Tomoo Ishii
- 1952 Yoshiro Hayashi
