= 1973 Asia Golf Circuit =

Golf tour season

1973 Asia Golf Circuit season
- Duration: 22 February 1973 – 22 April 1973
- Number of official events: 9
- Most wins: (South Korea) Kim Seung-hack (2) (Australia) Graham Marsh (2)
- Order of Merit: (Australia) Graham Marsh

The 1973 Asia Golf Circuit was the 12th season of the Asia Golf Circuit (formerly the Far East Circuit), the main professional golf tour in Asia since it was established in 1961.

== Schedule ==
The following table lists official events during the 1973 season.

Date	Tournament	Host country	Purse (US$)	Winner (Note: The number in brackets after each winner's name is the number of Asia Golf Circuit events they had won up to and including that tournament. This information is only shown for Asia Golf Circuit members.)	Notes
25 Feb	Philippine Open	Philippines	15,000	(South Korea) Kim Seung-hack (1)	
4 Mar	Hong Kong Open	Hong Kong	30,000	(Australia) Frank Phillips (5)	
11 Mar	Singapore Open	Singapore	25,000	(Philippines) Ben Arda (4)	
18 Mar	Malaysian Open	Malaysia	30,000	(Japan) Hideyo Sugimoto (3)	
25 Mar	Indian Open	India	15,000	(Australia) Graham Marsh (2)	
1 Apr	Thailand Open	Thailand	17,000	(Australia) Graham Marsh (3)	
8 Apr	Taiwan Open	Taiwan	20,000	(Philippines) Eleuterio Nival (1)	
15 Apr	Korea Open	South Korea	20,000	(South Korea) Kim Seung-hack (2)	
22 Apr	Sobu International Open	Japan	50,000	(Japan) Shigeru Uchida (1)	

== Order of Merit ==
The Order of Merit was based on tournament results during the season, calculated using a points-based system.

Position	Player	Points
1	(Australia) Graham Marsh	156
2	(Philippines) Ben Arda	129
3	(Philippines) Ireneo Legaspi	78
4	(South Korea) Kim Seung-hack	71
5	(Philippines) Eleuterio Nival	61
