= Hsieh Yung-yo =

Taiwanese professional golfer (born 1934)

Personal information
- Nationality: Taiwan
- Born: 22 October 1934 (age 92) Tamsui, New Taipei City, Taiwan
- Height: 1.75 m (5 ft 9 in)
- Weight: 65 kg (143 lb; 10.2 st)

Career
- Sport: Golf
- Status: Professional
- Former tours: Japan Golf Tour; Asia Golf Circuit
- Professional wins: 26

Number of wins by tour
- Japan Golf Tour: 2
- Asian Tour: 13 (Asia Golf Circuit)

Best results in major championships
- Masters Tournament: T29: 1970
- PGA Championship: DNP
- U.S. Open: DNP
- The Open Championship: DNP

Achievements and awards
- Asia Golf Circuit Order of Merit winner: 1964, 1965, 1968, 1969

Hsieh Yung-yo (Chinese: 謝永郁, born 23 October 1934) is a Taiwanese professional golfer.

== Career ==
Hsieh had great success playing throughout Asia, winning 16 national opens. Most of those victories were on the Far East Circuit, later known as the Asia Golf Circuit, where he was also the circuit champion on four occasions. He also played on the Japan Golf Tour, winning twice.

== Professional wins (26) ==
=== PGA of Japan Tour wins (2) ===
No.	Date	Tournament	Winning score	Margin of victory	Runner(s)-up
1	25 May 1975	Pepsi-Wilson Tournament	−5 (72-75-66-70=283)	1 stroke	(Australia) Graham Marsh, (Japan) Toshiaki Sekimizu
2	6 Jul 1975	ANA Sapporo Open	−11 (71-70-66-70=277)	2 strokes	(Japan) Takashi Murakami

PGA of Japan Tour playoff record (0–2)

No.	Year	Tournament	Opponent	Result
1	1974	Pepsi-Wilson Tournament	(Australia) Graham Marsh	Lost to birdie on fourth extra hole
2	1981	Yomiuri Open	(Japan) Namio Takasu	Lost to par on third extra hole

=== Asia Golf Circuit wins (13) ===
No.	Date	Tournament	Winning score	Margin of victory	Runner(s)-up
1	10 Mar 1963	Hong Kong Open	−16 (65-70-70-67=272)	3 strokes	(Japan) Tomoo Ishii
2	22 Mar 1964	Hong Kong Open (2)	−15 (65-70-68-66=269)	Playoff	(Australia) Alan Murray
3	21 Mar 1965	Thailand Open	−5 (72-71-70-70=283)	6 strokes	(Taiwan) Kuo Chie-Hsiung, (Philippines) Dionisio Nadales, (Japan) Koichi Ono, (Japan) Hideyo Sugimoto, (Japan) Shigeru Uchida
4	2 Apr 1967	Taiwan Open	−11 (69-71-70-67=277)	Playoff	(Taiwan) Lu Liang-Huan
5	3 Mar 1968	Singapore Open	−9 (70-68-66-71=275)	6 strokes	(South Korea) Han Chang-sang, (Japan) Kenji Hosoishi
6	31 Mar 1968	Taiwan Open (2)	−6 (282)	1 stroke	(Taiwan) Kuo Chie-Hsiung
7	23 Mar 1969	Thailand Open (2)	−11 (66-71-70-70=277)	8 strokes	(Taiwan) Hsu Chi-san
8	22 Feb 1970	Philippine Open	−6 (73-70-67-72=282)	6 strokes	(Philippines) Eleuterio Nival, (Japan) Haruo Yasuda
9	1 Mar 1970	Singapore Open	−8 (67-71-70-68=276)	2 strokes	(Australia) David Graham, (Japan) Haruo Yasuda
10	23 Feb 1975	Hong Kong Open (3)	+8 (70-71-76-71=288)	1 stroke	(Australia) Ted Ball, (United States) Gaylord Burrows, (Australia) Stewart Ginn
11	20 Feb 1977	Philippine Open (2)	−7 (68-68-72-73=281)	5 strokes	(Taiwan) Hsieh Min-Nan, (Taiwan) Kuo Chie-Hsiung
12	26 Feb 1978	Hong Kong Open (4)	−4 (65-68-70-72=275)	1 stroke	(South Korea) Kim Seung-hack
13	9 Apr 1978	Taiwan Open (4)	−5 (73-72-68-70=283)	Playoff	(Taiwan) Kuo Chie-Hsiung

Asia Golf Circuit playoff record (3–0)

No.	Year	Tournament	Opponent	Result
1	1964	Hong Kong Open	(Australia) Alan Murray	Won with birdie on fourth extra hole
2	1967	Taiwan Open	(Taiwan) Lu Liang-Huan	Won with birdie on first extra hole
3	1978	Taiwan Open	(Taiwan) Kuo Chie-Hsiung	Won with par on seventh extra hole

=== Japanese circuit wins (7) ===
- 1967 Chunichi Crowns
- 1969 Kanto Open
- 1970 Kanto Open, Wizard Tournament
- 1971 Kanto Open
- 1972 Hiroshima Open, World Friendship Tournament

=== Other Asian wins ===
this list may be incomplete

- 1961 Korea Open
- 1963 Korea Open
- 1969 Korea Open

=== Senior wins ===
- 1984 ROC PGA Senior Championship, Japan PGA Senior Championship

== Team appearances ==
- World Cup (representing Chinese Taipei): 1957, 1958, 1959, 1960, 1961, 1963, 1964, 1965, 1967, 1968, 1969, 1970, 1978
