= 1968 Asia Golf Circuit =

Golf tour season

1968 Asia Golf Circuit season
- Duration: 22 February 1968 – 7 April 1968
- Number of official events: 7
- Most wins: (Taiwan) Hsieh Yung-yo (2) (Australia) Randall Vines (2)
- Order of Merit: (Taiwan) Hsieh Yung-yo

The 1968 Asia Golf Circuit was the seventh season of the Asia Golf Circuit (formerly the Far East Circuit), the main professional golf tour in Asia since it was established in 1961.

== Changes for 1968 ==
It was the first season of the circuit under the new name of Asia Golf Circuit, which was changed in anticipation of South Korea and India joining the circuit.

== Schedule ==
The following table lists official events during the 1968 season.

Date	Tournament	Host country	Purse (US$)	Winner (Note: The number in brackets after each winner's name is the number of Asia Golf Circuit events they had won up to and including that tournament. This information is only shown for Asia Golf Circuit members.)	Notes
25 Feb	Philippine Open	Philippines	15,000	(Taiwan) Hsu Chi-san (1)	
3 Mar	Singapore Open	Singapore	12,500	(Taiwan) Hsieh Yung-yo (5)	
10 Mar	Malaysian Open	Malaysia	16,000	(Japan) Kenji Hosoishi (1)	
17 Mar	Thailand Open	Thailand	10,000	(Australia) Randall Vines (1)	
24 Mar	Hong Kong Open	Hong Kong	15,000	(Australia) Randall Vines (2)	
31 Mar	Taiwan Open	Hong Kong	10,000	(Taiwan) Hsieh Yung-yo (6)	
7 Apr	Yomiuri International	Japan	15,000	(Taiwan) Chen Ching-Po (1)	

=== Unofficial events ===
The following events were sanctioned by the Asia Golf Circuit, but did not carry official money, nor were wins official.

Date	Tournament	Host country	Purse ($)	Winner	Notes
14 Apr	Indian Open	India		(Japan) Kenji Hosoishi	
21 Apr	Kenya Open	Kenya		(England) Maurice Bembridge	

== Order of Merit ==
The Order of Merit was based on tournament results during the season, calculated using a points-based system.

Position	Player	Points
1	(Taiwan) Hsieh Yung-yo	102
2	(Australia) Randall Vines	98
3	(Japan) Kenji Hosoishi	84
4	(South Korea) Han Sang-chang	76
