= All Japan Doubles =

Tournament information
- Location: Kitahiroshima, Hokkaido, Japan
- Established: 1969
- Course: Sapporo Kokusai Country Club
- Tour: Japan Golf Tour
- Format: Pairs
- Final year: 1973

Final champion
- Takashi Murakami and Hideyo Sugimoto

Location map
- Location in Japan Location in Hokkaido

The All Japan Doubles or All Nippon Doubles was a professional golf tournament that was held in Japan from 1969 to 1973. A pairs event, it was founded by, and held at, Sapporo Kokusai Country Club in Kitahiroshima, Hokkaido and was an event on the Japan Golf Tour in its final year.

== Winners ==
- 1973 Takashi Murakami and Hideyo Sugimoto
- 1972 Takashi Murakami and Masashi Ozaki
- 1971 Shigeru Uchida and Hiroshi Ishii
- 1970 Takashi Murakami and Hideyo Sugimoto
- 1969 Takashi Murakami and Hideyo Sugimoto
