= Ross Newdick =

New Zealand professional golfer

Personal information
- Nationality: New Zealand
- Born: 1936 or 1937
- Died: November 2005 (aged 68) Noosa, Queensland, Australia

Career
- Sport: Golf
- Turned professional: 1963
- Professional wins: 2

Best results in major championships
- Masters Tournament: DNP
- PGA Championship: DNP
- U.S. Open: DNP
- The Open Championship: 46th: 1965

Ross R. Newdick (1936/1937 – November 2005) was a professional golfer from New Zealand. He had a successful amateur career winning the New Zealand Amateur Championship in 1960. He turned professional in 1963 and won the New Zealand PGA Championship and the Singapore Open in 1966.

== Amateur career ==
Newdick won the New Zealand Amateur in 1960, beating Ian Woodbury, 8 and 7, in the final at Invercargill. He represented New Zealand each year from 1959 to 1963, in the Commonwealth Tournament in 1959 and 1963, in the Eisenhower Trophy in 1960 and 1962 and in the Sloan Morpeth Trophy in 1961. In the Eisenhower Trophy, New Zealand finished 5th in 1960 and 4th in 1962.

== Professional career ==
Newdick turned professional in late 1963. He won both the New Zealand PGA Championship and the Singapore Open in early 1966. In January, he won the New Zealand PGA Championship after a final round of 64 to win by a stroke. In March, he won the Singapore Open, beating Lu Liang-Huan and George Will at the second hole of a sudden-death playoff. Newdick had been runner-up in the 1965 Hong Kong Open and in the 1965 Metalcraft Tournament, behind Peter Thomson on both occasions. He played in Europe in 1964, 1965 and 1966, playing in the Open Championship in 1964 and 1965. In the 1965 Open Championship at Royal Birkdale, he made the cut after rounds of 75 and 72. He was runner-up in the German Open in 1966.

== Later life ==
After retiring from tournament golf, Newdick was involved golf course design and development. In 2005, while working in China, he was diagnosed with cancer and died two months later.

== Amateur wins ==
- 1960 New Zealand Amateur

== Professional wins (2) ==
=== Far East Circuit wins (1) ===
No.	Date	Tournament	Winning score	Margin of victory	Runners-up
1	6 Mar 1966	Singapore Open	E (75-71-69-69=284)	Playoff	(Taiwan) Lu Liang-Huan, (Scotland) George Will

Asia Golf Circuit playoff record (1–0)

No.	Year	Tournament	Opponents	Result
1	1966	Singapore Open	(Taiwan) Lu Liang-Huan, (Scotland) George Will	Won with birdie on second extra hole

=== New Zealand Golf Circuit wins (1) ===
- 1966 New Zealand PGA Championship

== Results in major championships ==
Tournament	1964	1965
The Open Championship	CUT	46

Note: Newdick only played in The Open Championship.
CUT = missed the half-way cut

== Team appearances ==
Amateur

- Commonwealth Tournament (representing New Zealand): 1959, 1963
- Eisenhower Trophy (representing New Zealand): 1960, 1962
- Sloan Morpeth Trophy (representing New Zealand): 1961 (winners)
