= World Friendship =

Tournament information
- Location: Ikaruga, Nara, Japan
- Established: 1971
- Course: Horyuji Country Club
- Par: 72
- Tour: Japan Golf Tour
- Format: Stroke play
- Prize fund: ¥10,000,000
- Month played: May/June
- Final year: 1973

Tournament record score
- Aggregate: 276 Isao Aoki (1973); 276 Lu Liang-Huan (1973); 276 Graham Marsh (1973)
- To par: −12 as above

Final champion
- (Taiwan) Lu Liang-Huan

Location map
- Location in Japan Location in the Nara Prefecture

The World Friendship was a professional golf tournament held in Japan in the early 1970s. The event was held at the Horyuji Country Club in Ikaruga, Nara.

The second tournament was won by Taiwan's Hsieh Yung-yo, who came from a stroke behind 54-hole leader, New Zealand's Terry Kendall, to claim first prize.

In its final year, the event was part of the inaugural season of the Japan Golf Tour. Another Taiwanese, Lu Liang-Huan ("Mr. Lu"), won the event. He defeated Australia's Graham Marsh and Japan's Isao Aoki in a playoff.

== Winners ==
Year	Winner	Score	To par	Margin of victory	Runners-up	Ref.
1973	(Taiwan) Lu Liang-Huan	276	−12	Playoff	(Japan) Isao Aoki (Australia) Graham Marsh	
1972	(Taiwan) Hsieh Yung-yo	279	−9	1 stroke	(New Zealand) Terry Kendall (Japan) Haruo Yasuda	
