= 1964 Far East Circuit =

Golf tour season

1964 Far East Circuit season
- Duration: 20 February 1964 – 22 March 1964
- Number of official events: 5
- Most wins: (Japan) Tomoo Ishii (2)
- Order of Merit: (Taiwan) Hsieh Yung-yo

The 1964 Far East Circuit was the third season of the Far East Circuit, the main professional golf tour in Asia since it was established in 1961.

== Schedule ==
The following table lists official events during the 1964 season.

Date	Tournament	Host country	Purse (US$)	Winner (Note: The number in brackets after each winner's name is the number of Far East Circuit events they had won up to and including that tournament. This information is only shown for Far East Circuit members.)	Notes
23 Feb	Philippine Open	Philippines	₱20,000	(Australia) Peter Thomson (2)	
1 Mar	Capitol Hills Open	Philippines	5,000	(Japan) Tomoo Ishii (1)	New tournament
8 Mar	Singapore Open	Singapore	10,000	(Australia) Ted Ball (1)	
15 Mar	Malayan Open	Malaya	10,000	(Japan) Tomoo Ishii (2)	
22 Mar	Hong Kong Open	Hong Kong	11,500	(Taiwan) Hsieh Yung-yo (2)	

== Order of Merit ==
The Order of Merit was based on tournament results during the season, calculated using a points-based system.

Position	Player	Points
1	(Taiwan) Hsieh Yung-yo	94
2	(Japan) Tomoo Ishii	
3	(Australia) Peter Thomson	
4	(Japan) Tadashi Kitta	
