= 1970 Asia Golf Circuit =

Golf tour season

1970 Asia Golf Circuit season
- Duration: 19 February 1970 – 19 April 1970
- Number of official events: 9
- Most wins: (Taiwan) Hsieh Yung-yo (2)
- Order of Merit: (Philippines) Ben Arda

The 1970 Asia Golf Circuit was the ninth season of the Asia Golf Circuit (formerly the Far East Circuit), the main professional golf tour in Asia since it was established in 1961.

== Schedule ==
The following table lists official events during the 1970 season.

| Date | Tournament | Host country | Purse (US$) | Winner (Note: The number in brackets after each winner's name is the number of Asia Golf Circuit events they had won up to and including that tournament. This information is only shown for Asia Golf Circuit members.) | Notes |
|---|---|---|---|---|---|
| 22 Feb | Philippine Open | Philippines | 21,500 | (Taiwan) Hsieh Yung-yo (8) | |
| 1 Mar | Singapore Open | Singapore | 20,000 | (Taiwan) Hsieh Yung-yo (9) | |
| 8 Mar | Malaysian Open | Malaysia | 25,000 | (Philippines) Ben Arda (3) | |
| 15 Mar | Indian Open | India | 20,000 | (Taiwan) Chen Chien-Chung (1) | Upgraded to official event |
| 22 Mar | Thailand Open | Thailand | 15,000 | (Australia) David Graham (1) | |
| 29 Mar | Hong Kong Open | Hong Kong | 16,500 | (Japan) Isao Katsumata (1) | |
| 5 Apr | Taiwan Open | Taiwan | 12,000 | (Taiwan) Chang Chung-fa (1) | |
| 12 Apr | Korea Open | South Korea | 12,000 | (South Korea) Han Chang-sang (1) | New to Asia Golf Circuit |
| 19 Apr | Yomiuri International | Japan | 21,500 | (Australia) David Graham (2) | |

== Order of Merit ==
The Order of Merit was based on tournament results during the season, calculated using a points-based system.

| Position | Player | Points |
|---|---|---|
| 1 | (Philippines) Ben Arda | 120 |
| 2 | (Australia) David Graham | 104 |
| 3 | (Taiwan) Hsieh Min-Nan | 100 |
| 4 | (Taiwan) Hsieh Yung-yo | 99 |
