= Capitol Hills Open =

Filipino golf tournament

Tournament information
- Location: Quezon, Philippines
- Established: 1964
- Courses: Capitol Hills Golf & Country Club
- Par: 71
- Tour: Far East Circuit
- Format: Stroke play
- Prize fund: US$5,000
- Month played: April/May
- Final year: 1964

Tournament record score
- Aggregate: 280 Tomoo Ishii (1964)
- To par: −4 as above

Final champion
- (Japan) Tomoo Ishii

Location map
- Location in the Philippines

The Capitol Hills Open was a golf tournament held in the Philippines in February/March 1964. The event was on the Far East Circuit.

Tomoo Ishii and Peter Thomson were tied for the lead entering the final round at 211 (−2). Ishii shot a final round 69 (−2) and won by two over Filipino Ben Arda. Celestino Tugot, also of the Philippines, was a further shot back at 283 (−1). He was the only other player to finish under par. Thomson faltered with a final round 73 and finished solo fourth at 284 (E).

Amateurs Hsieh Min-Nan and Kuo Chie-Hsiung, both of Taiwan, finished tied at 296 (+12). To determine the amateur champion there was a sudden-death playoff. Hsieh won at the first hole.

== Winners ==
Year	Winner	Score	To par	Margin of victory	Runner-up
1964	(Japan) Tomoo Ishii	280	−4	2 strokes	(Philippines) Ben Arda
