= 1957 Canada Cup =

Tournament information
- Dates: 24–27 October
- Location: Kawagoe, Saitama, Japan; 35°54′5″N 139°24′16″E
- Courses: Kasumigaseki Country Club; East Course
- Format: 72 holes stroke play combined score

Statistics
- Par: 72
- Length: 6.895 yards (6.305 m)
- Field: 30 two-man teams

Champion
- Japan; Torakichi Nakamura & Koichi Ono
- 557

Location map
- Location in Asia Location in Japan Location in Saitama Prefecture

The 1957 Canada Cup took place 24–27 October on the East Course at the Kasumigaseki Country Club in Kawagoe, Saitama, Japan. It was the fifth Canada Cup event, which became the World Cup in 1967. The tournament was a 72-hole stroke play team event with 30 teams. These were the same 29 teams that had competed in 1956 with the addition of Thailand. Each team consisted of two players from a country. The combined score of each team determined the team results. The Japanese team of Torakichi Nakamura and Koichi Ono won by nine strokes over the American team of Jimmy Demaret and Sam Snead. The individual competition was won by Torakichi Nakamura, seven shots ahead of Gary Player, Sam Snead and Dave Thomas.

== Teams ==
Country	Players
Argentina	Antonio Cerdá and Leopoldo Ruiz
Australia	Bruce Crampton and Peter Thomson
Belgium	Arthur Devulder and Flory Van Donck
Brazil	Mário Gonzalez and Juan Querrellos
Canada	Al Balding and Stan Leonard
Chile	Manuel Morales and Enrique Orellana
China	Chen Ching-Po and Hsieh Yung-yo
Colombia	Oswaldo de Vincenzo and Miguel Sala
Denmark	Henning Kristensen and Carl Paulsen
Egypt	Cherif El-Sayed Cherif and Mohamed Said Moussa
England	Peter Alliss and Ken Bousfield
France	Jean Garaïalde and François Saubaber
Ireland	Harry Bradshaw and Christy O'Connor Snr
Italy	Alfonso Angelini and Ugo Grappasonni
Japan	Torakichi Nakamura and Koichi Ono
Mexico	Felipe Galindo and Jose Palacios
Netherlands	Cees Cramer and Gerard de Wit
New Zealand	John Kelly and Ernie Southerden
Philippines	Leony Carrasco and Celestino Tugot
Portugal	Henrique Paulino and Fernando Silva
Scotland	Eric Brown and John Panton
South Africa	Harold Henning and Gary Player
South Korea	Park Myeong-chul and Yun Duk-choon
Spain	Carlos Celles and Ángel Miguel
Sweden	Åke Bergquist and Harry Karlsson
Switzerland	Jacky Bonvin and Robert Lanz
Thailand	Uthai Dabphavibul and Manb Debphavibul
United States	Jimmy Demaret and Sam Snead
Wales	Dai Rees and Dave Thomas
West Germany	Georg Bessner and Kaspar Marx

== Scores ==
Team

Place	Country	Score	To par
1	Japan	141-138-135-143=557	−19
2	United States	136-145-142-143=566	−10
3	South Africa	144-139-146-140=569	−7
4	Australia	145-139-145-143=572	−4
5	Wales	146-140-142-145=573	−3
6	Canada	145-144-141-146=576	E
7	England	146-140-148-145=579	+3
8	Brazil	146-145-144-146=581	+5
9	Argentina	147-146-147-146=586	+10
10	Scotland	150-150-149-138=587	+11
T11	China	149-151-152-143=595	+19
T11	Philippines	151-148-147-149=595	+19
13	France	154-148-153-144=599	+23
T14	Belgium	151-151-153-148=603	+27
T14	Colombia	152-151-150-150=603	+27
T14	Italy	150-157-152-144=603	+27
17	New Zealand	154-149-156-146=605	+29
18	Sweden	149-154-155-148=606	+30
T19	Chile	154-163-146-148=611	+35
T19	Netherlands	153-153-151-154=611	+35
21	Spain	154-152-155-152=613	+37
22	Egypt	156-157-152-150=616	+40
23	West Germany	155-151-158-159=623	+47
24	Mexico	158-154-161-153=626	+50
T25	Denmark	156-161-162-154=633	+57
T25	Thailand	154-163-162-154=633	+57
27	Switzerland	164-157-161-153=635	+59
28	South Korea	164-161-161-151=637	+61
WD	Ireland	148-147-WD	
WD	Portugal		

Harry Bradshaw of Ireland withdrew after 36 holes due to a broken nose, while Fernando Silva of Portugal withdrew after 54 holes due to illness.

International Trophy

Place	Player	Country	Score	To par
1	Torakichi Nakamura	Japan	68-68-67-71=274	−14
T2	Gary Player	South Africa	73-69-71-68=281	−7
T2	Sam Snead	United States	67-74-71-69=281	−7
T2	Dave Thomas	Wales	73-67-70-71=281	−7
T5	Stan Leonard	Canada	71-71-70-71=283	−5
T5	Koichi Ono	Japan	73-70-68-72=283	−5
T7	Bruce Crampton	Australia	73-71-72-69=285	−3
T7	Jimmy Demaret	United States	69-71-71-74=285	−3
9	Peter Thomson	Australia	72-68-73-74=287	−1
T10	Peter Alliss	England	73-67-75-73=288	E
T10	Antonio Cerdá	Argentina	72-72-73-71=288	E
T10	Harold Henning	South Africa	71-70-75-72=288	E
