= Hugh Boyle (golfer) =

Irish golfer

Personal information
- Full name: Hugh F. J. Boyle
- Nationality: Ireland
- Born: 28 January 1936 Omeath, County Louth, Ireland
- Died: 23 May 2015 (aged 79) England

Career
- Sport: Golf
- Turned professional: 1952
- Former tour: European Tour
- Professional wins: 5

Best results in major championships
- Masters Tournament: DNP
- PGA Championship: DNP
- U.S. Open: DNP
- The Open Championship: T8: 1967

Hugh F. J. Boyle (28 January 1936 – 23 May 2015) was an Irish professional golfer best known for his achievements in the mid-1960s.

== Early life ==
Boyle was born in Omeath, County Louth, Ireland.

== Professional career ==
In 1966, he was the winner of both the Yomiuri International and the Daks Tournament, in 1965 he was second in the Senior Service Tournament while in 1967 he gained a second place in the Schweppes Open (PGA Championship). He finished in eighth place at the 1967 Open Championship, behind the champion, Roberto De Vicenzo, and, second placed, Jack Nicklaus, at the Royal Liverpool Golf Club. His final round of 68 was the best by a PGA member that year and won him the Tooting Bec Cup. He also won the Irish PGA Championship in 1967.

Boyle represented Ireland in the 1967 World Cup in Mexico City, partnering Christy O'Connor Snr. He played in the 1967 Ryder Cup team, where he lost twice against Arnold Palmer in the pairs and to Gay Brewer in the singles.

Boyle held the professional course record at the Royal Norwich Golf Club with a score of 66.

In 1983, Boyle became a head professional at the Royal Wimbledon Club, a position he retained for over twenty years.

== Professional wins (5) ==
=== Far East Circuit wins (1) ===
No.	Date	Tournament	Winning score	Margin of victory	Runner-up
1	10 Apr 1966	Yomiuri International	−2 (68-71-71-76=286)	2 strokes	(Australia) Ted Ball

=== Other wins (4) ===
- 1966 Daks Tournament
- 1967 Irish PGA Championship, Blaxnit (Ulster) Tournament
- 1970 Irish Dunlop Tournament

== Results in major championships ==
Tournament	1962	1963	1964	1965	1966	1967	1968	1969	1970	1971	1972	1973	1974
The Open Championship	T27	CUT	CUT	T12	CUT	T8	CUT	CUT	CUT		CUT	T18	CUT

Note: Boyle only played in The Open Championship.

Top 10
Did not play

CUT = missed the half-way cut (3rd round cut in 1972 Open Championship)
"T" indicates a tie for a place

== Team appearances ==
- Ryder Cup (representing Great Britain): 1967
- World Cup (representing Ireland): 1967
- R.T.V. International Trophy (representing Ireland): 1967
- Double Diamond International (representing Ireland): 1971, 1972
