= Golf Association of Hong Kong, China =

Organization

- Abbreviation: HKGA
- Formation: 1968
- Headquarters: Suite 2003, Olympic House, Stadium Path, So Kon Po, Causeway Bay, Hong Kong
- Location: Hong Kong
- Region served: Hong Kong
- Members: 15,000
- President: Ning Li
- Vice-President: Mark Chan
- CEO: Danny Lai
- Affiliations: The R&A, European Tour, Asian Tour
- Website: hkga.com

The Golf Association of Hong Kong, China (GAHKC) (formerly Hong Kong Golf Association) is Hong Kong's national golf association. The HKGA is primarily concerned with managing and overseeing the development of the sport of golf in Hong Kong. The HKGA provides guidance on the running of national championships, supports in the training of players, and also helps to finance a national team that represents Hong Kong in international competitions. The HKGA currently oversees 40 amateur tournaments annually, and is involved in the running of The Hong Kong Open.

In addition, the HKGA also provides a centralised handicapping service for more than 15,000 subscribers that conforms to standards set by the USGA.

== History ==
The establishment of the HKGA was predicated by a growing interest in the game of golf by the local population of Hong Kong. While golf had been in Hong Kong since around 1889, it was primarily the domain of the expatriate population. This developing interest in golf by locals created the need for an authoritative body to oversee the development of the sport. The HKGA was officially established in 1968 to co-ordinate efforts in growing the game of golf in Hong Kong. The organisation now acts as the governing body for amateur golf in Hong Kong.

== Organisational structure ==
The HKGA has an Executive Committee formed through the membership of constituent golf clubs in Hong Kong. These clubs include the Clearwater Bay Golf and Country Club, Discovery Bay Golf Club, The Hong Kong Golf Club, and Shek O Country Club.

The Executive Committee includes a President, Vice-President, and Delegates from each of the four constituent clubs (as well as alternates from each club), an Honorary Secretary, and an Honorary Treasurer position. The positions of President and Vice-President are assigned annually through a rotating nomination by the four constituent clubs.

== Hong Kong national teams ==
The HKGA has focused on building an internationally competitive national team through the financing of a developmental squad training programme. Currently, the HKGA has both a Men's and a Women’s National Team. Selection for these teams is based largely on tournament performance. The majority of national team players are ranked as top amateurs by the World Amateur Golf Rankings.

== Initiatives ==
In addition to building and supporting a competitive national team, the HKGA is also involved in several other golf-focused initiatives. These initiatives have facilitated a growing interest in golf by the local population of Hong Kong. The HKGA now supports more than 1,600 junior golfers, and has over 100 individuals in its junior development programme.

=== HSBC Junior Golf Programme ===
An effort to provide Hong Kong's youth with a structured introduction to golf. The programme includes various initiatives, such as the HSBC Golf for Schools Programme, the HSBC Junior Development Programme, and the organisation of a match between top junior golfers from Hong Kong and China.

==== HSBC Golf for Schools Programme ====
This programme provides children between the ages of 6–12 with the opportunity to try golf at their local schools through an introductory training system called ShortGolf. The primary goal of the programme is to introduce golf to primary school students across Hong Kong, and to make the sport more accessible by providing children the opportunity to be exposed to golf. The programme also provides basic-level golf instruction to teachers so that they will be able to continue lessons independently. The program has seen great support. In 2014 at the Hong Kong Open, golfing professionals Robert-Jan Derksen and Liang Wen-Chong ran a seminar open to the public for all four-tournament days. The program concludes with on-course golf lessons, and the opportunity to earn an official HKGA handicap index.

==== HSBC Junior Development Programme ====
A talent-identification programme that tracks performance in HKGA-sanctioned junior tournaments. Top performers are offered the chance to become part of the HKGA Junior Squad for weekly coaching and talent development.

== HKGA squads ==
The HKGA supports several different golfing squads with the primary mission of developing golfing talent in Hong Kong. These squads include: the Junior Squad, the Elite Junior Squad, the Men’s and Ladies’ Squad, and the Hong Kong National Team. Invitations are extended based on performance at pre-defined local tournaments, performance at talent identification days, or on the recommendation of a golf professional. Minimum handicap requirements are also set.

=== Junior Squad ===
The entry-level HKGA squad that provides a structured instructional development programme for Hong Kong’s top junior golfers under the age of 18. The programme includes weekly training classes, on-course practice, tournament entry, and other development initiatives.

=== Elite Junior Squad ===
Top Junior Squad members are promoted to the Elite Junior Squad, which consists of golfers between the ages of 11 and 17.

=== Men's and Ladies' squads ===
Top Elite Junior Squad members are promoted to the HKGA Men’s and Ladies’ squads once they have reached the age of 18.

=== Hong Kong National Team ===
The Hong Kong National Team consists of the top golfers in Hong Kong. There is no set age restriction, and eligibility is determined by performance. In addition to attending training sessions and participating in tournaments, National Squad members are expected to demonstrate their understanding of the game by attaining at least a Level 1 R&A rule accreditation certification.

== Tournaments ==
Currently, the HKGA runs 40 different amateur men's, women's, and junior golf tournaments annually. With the best-known of these being the Hong Kong Open Championship, a professional tournament co-sanctioned by the European and Asian Tours.
