= 1966 Far East Circuit =

Golf tour season

1966 Far East Circuit season
- Duration: 24 February 1966 – 10 April 1966
- Number of official events: 7
- Order of Merit: (Taiwan) Lu Liang-Huan

The 1966 Far East Circuit was the fifth season of the Far East Circuit, the main professional golf tour in Asia since it was established in 1961.

== Schedule ==
The following table lists official events during the 1966 season.

Date	Tournament	Host country	Purse (US$)	Winner (Note: The number in brackets after each winner's name is the number of Far East Circuit events they had won up to and including that tournament. This information is only shown for Far East Circuit members.)	Notes
27 Feb	Philippine Open	Philippines	MS$105,000	(Philippines) Luis Silverio (a) (1)	
6 Mar	Singapore Open	Singapore	15,000	(New Zealand) Ross Newdick (1)	
13 Mar	Malayan Open	Malaya	15,000	(South Africa) Harold Henning (1)	
20 Mar	Thailand Open	Thailand	15,000	(Japan) Tadashi Kitta (1)	
27 Mar	Hong Kong Open	Hong Kong	10,000	(Australia) Frank Phillips (4)	
3 Apr	Taiwan Open	Taiwan	15,000	(Taiwan) Lu Liang-Huan (2)	New to Far East Circuit
10 Apr	Yomiuri International	Japan	15,000	(Republic of Ireland) Hugh Boyle (n/a)	

== Order of Merit ==
The Order of Merit was based on tournament results during the season, calculated using a points-based system.

Position	Player	Points
1	(Taiwan) Lu Liang-Huan	126
