= 1969 World Cup (men's golf) =

Coordinates: 1.344°N 103.812°E

Tournament information
- Dates: 2–5 October
- Location: Singapore
- Courses: Singapore Island Country Club; Bukit Course
- Format: 72 holes stroke play combined score

Statistics
- Par: 71
- Length: 6,692 yards (6,119 m)
- Field: 45 two-man teams
- Cut: None
- Prize fund: US$6,300
- Winner's share: $2,000 team $1,000 individual

Champion
- United States; Orville Moody & Lee Trevino
- 552 (−16)

Location map
- Location in Southeast Asia Location south of Malaysia Location in Singapore

The 1969 World Cup took place 2–5 October at Singapore Island Country Club in Singapore. It was the 17th World Cup event. The tournament was a 72-hole stroke play team event with 45 teams. Each team consisted of two players from a country. The combined score of each team determined the team results. The American team of Orville Moody and Lee Trevino won by eight strokes over the Japan team of Takaaki Kono and Haruo Yasuda. This was the tenth victory for the United States in the history of the World Cup, until 1967 named the Canada Cup. The individual competition was won by Trevino one stroke ahead of Roberto De Vicenzo, Argentina.

== Teams ==
Country	Players
Argentina	Roberto De Vicenzo and Leopoldo Ruiz
Australia	Bill Dunk and Peter Thomson
Austria	Oswald Gartenmaier and Klaus Nierlich (a)
Belgium	Donald Swaelens and Flory Van Donck
Brazil	Luis Carlos Pinto and Humberto Rocha
Burma	Mya Aye and Kyaw Nyunt
Canada	Al Balding and George Knudson
Chile	Francisco Cerda and Manuel Morales
China	Hsieh Yung-yo and Hsu Chi-san
Colombia	Alfonso Bohórquez and Rogelio Gonzalez
Czechoslovakia	Jiri Dvorak (a) and Jan Kunšta (a)
Denmark	Herluf Hansen and Henning Kristensen
Egypt	Abdel Halim and Mohamed Said Moussa
England	Peter Butler and Peter Townsend
France	Roger Cotton and Patrick Cros
Greece	John Sotiropoulos and Stefano Vafiadis (a)
Hawaii	Jerry Johnston and Allan T. Yamamoto (a)
India	Shadi Lai and Ruda Valji
Indonesia	S. Denin and Azis Nawri
Ireland	Jimmy Kinsella and Christy O'Connor Snr
Italy	Roberto Bernardini and Alfonso Angelini
Japan	Takaaki Kono and Haruo Yasuda
Malaysia	Kwan Chong Choo (a) and Jalal Deran (a)
Mexico	Ramon Cruz and Juan Neri
Morocco	M'barek Mellouki and Meskine Hajjaj
Netherlands	Martin Roesink and Bertus van Mook
New Zealand	Terry Kendall and John Lister
Peru	Hugo Neri and Bernabé Fajardo
Philippines	Ben Arda and Eleuterio Nival
Portugal	Manuel Ribeiro and Joaquin Rodriguez
Puerto Rico	Juan Gonzalez and Jesús Rodríguez
Romania	Muntanu Dumitru and Paul Tomita
Scotland	Bernard Gallacher and George Will
Singapore	Phua Thin Kiay and Alvin Liau
South Africa	Bobby Cole and Graham Henning
South Korea	Kim Sung-yun and Lee Il-an
Spain	Ángel Gallardo and Ramón Sota
Sweden	Åke Bergquist and Tony Lidholm
Switzerland	Jacky Bonvin and Bernard Cordonier
Thailand	Sukree Onsham and Sushin Suwanapong
United States	Orville Moody and Lee Trevino
Uruguay	Juan Sereda and Pascual Viola
Venezuela	C. Garcia and Angel Sanchez
Wales	Brian Huggett and Dave Thomas
West Germany	Hans Heiser and Toni Kugelmüller

(a) denotes amateur

== Scores ==
Team

Place	Country	Score	To par	Money (US$) (per team)
1	United States	138-140-140-134=552	−16	2,000
2	Japan	142-140-142-136=560	−8	1,000
3	Argentina	141-138-145-137=561	−7	800
T4	China	138-139-139-146=562	−6	200
T4	Thailand	139-140-140-143=562	−6	200
6	Philippines	140-144-136-144=564	−4	
7	Spain	144-140-144-140=568	E	
8	Belgium	149-145-141-138=573	+5	
9	Australia	144-139-148-143=574	+6	
10	Colombia	143-144-143-145=575	+7	
11	Wales	149-140-144-143=576	+8	
12	South Africa	142-149-145-141=577	+9	
13	Canada	143-146-144-145=578	+10	
T14	England	149-145-146-139=579	+11	
T14	Italy	145-144-147-143=579	+11	
16	Brazil	149-143-147-141=580	+12	
17	Mexico	140-145-146-150=581	+13	
18	Egypt	150-144-144-144=582	+14	
19	New Zealand	148-147-144-146=585	+17	
T20	Scotland	153-143-146-144=586	+18	
T20	South Korea	146-148-147-145=586	+18	
22	France	147-150-149-143=589	+21	
23	West Germany	150-147-149-145=591	+23	
24	Austria	155-141-147-149=592	+24	
25	Singapore	150-145-146-152=593	+25	
26	Netherlands	148-150-150-147=595	+27	
T27	Chile	149-151-151-145=596	+28	
T27	Puerto Rico	153-149-146-148=596	+28	
29	Malaysia	151-148-152-147=598	+30	
T30	Denmark	153-148-151-150=602	+34	
T30	Peru	152-146-157-147=602	+34	
32	Ireland	151-149-154-153=607	+39	
33	India	150-152-158-149=609	+41	
34	Hawaii	156-151-152-151=610	+42	
35	Indonesia	154-156-152-150=612	+44	
36	Greece	155-147-153-158=613	+45	
T37	Burma	154-151-155-155=615	+47	
T37	Switzerland	154-149-154-158=615	+47	
T39	Portugal	154-152-151-160=617	+49	
T39	Venezuela	151-155-155-156=617	+49	
41	Uruguay	157-154-153-154=618	+50	
42	Czechoslovakia	151-157-156-163=627	+59	
43	Sweden	162-156-157-154=629	+61	
44	Morocco	168-161-155-166=650	+82	
45	Romania	170-172-167-175=684	+116	

International Trophy

Place	Player	Country	Score	To par	Money (US$)
1	Lee Trevino	United States	71-70-69-65=275	−9	1,000
2	Roberto De Vicenzo	Argentina	69-68-74-65=276	−8	500
T3	Hsieh Yung-yo	China	66-70-69-72=277	−7	200
T3	Orville Moody	United States	67-70-71-69=277	−7	200
T3	Sukree Onsham	Thailand	67-73-67-70=277	−7	200
6	Ben Arda	Philippines	70-69-69-70=278	−6	
7	Takaaki Kono	Japan	72-68-72-67=279	−5	
8	Haruo Yasuda	Japan	70-72-70-69=281	−3	
T9	Martin Roesink	Netherlands	71-72-69-71=283	−1	
T9	Ramón Sota	Spain	71-71-72-69=283	−1	
