= Alan Murray (golfer) =

Australian professional golfer (1940–2019)

Personal information
- Full name: Alan Albert Murray
- Nationality: Australia
- Born: 17 June 1940 Sydney, New South Wales
- Died: 24 May 2019 (aged 78) Perth, Western Australia

Career
- Sport: Golf
- Status: Professional
- Professional wins: 76

Best results in major championships
- The Open Championship: T19: 1964

Alan Albert Murray (17 June 1940 – 24 May 2019) was an Australian professional golfer.

== Career ==
In 1940, Murray was born in Sydney. He was educated at North Sydney Boys High School.

Murray was an international golfer. He won 76 tournaments across the world. The biggest were: the 1961 Australian PGA Championship, 1962 French Open, and the 1967 Wills Masters. In his only start in a major championship, he finished tied for 19th in the 1964 Open Championship. Murray represented Australia in the 1967 World Cup at Mexico City.

He was also a co-founder, president, and Life Member of the Singapore PGA. He was the principal director of Champions Golf Academy, and coached players of all standards in South East Asia for the past 36 years.

== Personal life ==
Murray died in Perth, Western Australia on 24 May 2019 after a long battle with skin cancer.

== Awards and honors ==
- In 1961, Murray earned Australian PGA's Order of Merit.
- In 2005, Murray earned Life Member status for the PGA of Australia.

== Professional wins ==
=== Australian circuit wins (19) ===
- 1960 Queensland Open, Albury Open
- 1961 Tasmanian Open, New South Wales PGA, Victorian Open, Australian PGA Championship, NSW Cup
- 1963 North Coast Open
- 1965 Tasmanian Open, Victorian PGA Championship, Victorian Open, NBC 3
- 1966 City of Sydney Open, Wagga City Open
- 1967 Wills Masters, Wagga City Open
- 1968 City of Sydney Open
- 1969 Tasmanian Open
- 1971 Forbes Open

=== European circuit wins (1) ===
- 1962 French Open

=== Japanese circuit wins (1) ===
- 1963 Dunlop Invitational

=== Singapore circuit wins (5) ===
- 1973 Keppel Open, Sembawang Open, Rolex Masters
- 1975 Rolex Masters
- 1978 Rolex Masters

=== Other Asian wins (2) ===
- 1973 Seletar Open
- 1974 Tengah Open

=== Other wins (23) ===
- 1958 PGA Golf Assistants State Championships
- 1960 Albury Open, Lismore Open
- 1961 Pymble Cup, Killara Cup, Asquith Cup, Yarrawonga Open
- 1962 David Low Invitational Carnoustie (Europe)
- 1963 Liquor Trades Tournament, Kilara Cup, Ashlar Cup
- 1964 Oatlands Cup, McKay Open
- 1965 Eastlakes Cup, Rockhampton Open
- 1967 Chatswood Open
- 1969 Cromer Open, Strathfield Open, Rotarua Open, Queenstown Open, Mudgee Open
- 1973 19th D.S.R.A International Tournament

== Playoff record ==
Far East Circuit playoff record (0–1)

No.	Year	Tournament	Opponent	Result
1	1964	Hong Kong Open	(Taiwan) Hsieh Yung-yo	Lost to birdie on fourth extra hole

== Team appearances ==
- World Cup (representing Australia): 1967
