= 1962 Far East Circuit =

Golf tour season

1962 Far East Circuit season
- Duration: 8 February 1962 – 11 March 1962
- Number of official events: 5
- Order of Merit: (Australia) Peter Thomson

The 1962 Far East Circuit was the inaugural season of the Far East Circuit, the main professional golf tour in Asia since it was established in 1961.

== Season outline ==
The circuit consisted of five tournaments over five weeks, and was formed from the existing national open championships of the Philippines, Hong Kong and Singapore, along with the inaugural national open championship of Malaysia and the Yomiuri Shimbun sponsored Yomiuri International in Japan. There was a total prize fund of just over M$200,000, which included a bonus pool sponsored by Seagram of M$15,000 for the overall circuit prize.

Golfers from around the world participated in the tour, including some of the biggest names in Australian golf, and it was multiple Open Championship winner, Peter Thomson, who emerged as the circuit's first Order of Merit winner.

== Schedule ==
The following table lists official events during the 1962 season.

Date	Tournament	Host country	Purse (US$)	Winner (Note: The number in brackets after each winner's name is the number of Far East Circuit events they had won up to and including that tournament. This information is only shown for Far East Circuit members.)	Notes
11 Feb	Philippine Open	Philippines	11,500	(Philippines) Celestino Tugot (1)	
18 Feb	Singapore Open	Singapore	MS$28,000	(South Africa) Brian Wilkes (1)	
25 Feb	Malayan Open	Malaya	£A3,000	(Australia) Frank Phillips (1)	New tournament
4 Mar	Hong Kong Open	Hong Kong	9,000	(Australia) Len Woodward (1)	
11 Mar	Yomiuri International	Japan	15,000	(Australia) Peter Thomson (1)	New tournament

== Order of Merit ==
The Order of Merit was based on tournament results during the season, calculated using total strokes.

Position	Player	Strokes
1	(Australia) Peter Thomson	1,405
2	(Australia) Kel Nagle	1,422
3	(Australia) Frank Phillips	1,422
4	(New Zealand) Bob Charles	1,430
