= Kansai Pro Championship =

Japanese golf tournament

The Kansai Pro Championship was a professional golf tournament in Japan. It was first played in 1931 and was an event on the Japan Golf Tour from 1973 to 1990. It was played in July at a variety of courses in Western Japan, around the Kansai region.

== Winners ==
- 1990 Kōki Idoki
- 1989 Hajime Matsui
- 1988 Masahiro Kuramoto
- 1987 Yoshitaka Yamamoto
- 1986 Teruo Sugihara
- 1985 Keiichi Kobayashi
- 1984 Teruo Sugihara
- 1983 Yoshitaka Yamamoto
- 1982 Hideto Shigenobu
- 1981 Norio Suzuki
- 1980 Teruo Sugihara
- 1979 Tōru Nakamura
- 1978 Teruo Sugihara
- 1977 Kosaku Shimada
- 1976 Shinsaku Maeda
- 1975 Hiroshi Ishii
- 1974 Kosaku Shimada
- 1973 Kosaku Shimada
- 1972 Teruo Sugihara
- 1971 Toichiro Toda
- 1970 Teruo Sugihara
- 1969 Toichiro Toda
- 1968 Shiro Matsuda
- 1967 Teruo Sugihara
- 1966 Tadashi Kitta
- 1965 Teruo Sugihara
- 1964 Teruo Sugihara
- 1963 Susumu Arai
- 1962 Shozo Miyamoto
- 1961 Shiro Matsuda
- 1960 Yousei Shimamura
- 1959 Miyoshi Kimoto
- 1958 Miyoshi Kimoto
- 1957 Tadashi Kitta
- 1956 Tetsuo Ishii
- 1955 Yousei Shimamura
- 1954 Yousei Shimamura
- 1953 Yousei Shimamura
- 1952 Teizo Ueda
- 1951 Yuzuru Nishimura
- 1950 Jisaku Ishii
- 1949 Kinichi Teramoto
- 1943-48 No tournament
- 1942 Tomekichi Miyamoto
- 1941 Tomekichi Miyamoto
- 1940 Toichiro Toda
- 1939 Toichiro Toda
- 1938 Toichiro Toda
- 1937 Akira Muraki
- 1936 Toichiro Toda
- 1935 Jisaku Ishii
- 1934 Toichiro Toda
- 1933 Tomekichi Miyamoto
- 1932 Tomekichi Miyamoto
- 1931 Jiro Morioka
