= Takaaki Kono =

Japanese professional golfer (1940–2010)

Personal information
- Nationality: Japan
- Born: 4 January 1940 Kanagawa Prefecture, Japan
- Died: 22 April 2010 (aged 70)
- Height: 1.60 m (5 ft 3 in)
- Weight: 64 kg (141 lb; 10.1 st)

Career
- Sport: Golf
- Status: Professional
- Former tours: Japan Golf Tour; Asia Golf Circuit
- Professional wins: 17

Number of wins by tour
- Japan Golf Tour: 2
- Other: 15

Best results in major championships
- Masters Tournament: T12: 1970
- PGA Championship: DNP
- U.S. Open: DNP
- The Open Championship: DNP

Takaaki Kono (4 January 1940 – 22 April 2010) was a Japanese professional golfer.

== Early life ==
Kono was born in Kanagawa Prefecture, Japan in 1940. He started playing golf at the age of 15.

== Professional career ==
Kono had much success on the Japanese and Asian circuits at the beginning of his career, winning several times. One of his top successes was at the 1969 Malaysian Open. Six shots behind at the beginning of the final round, Kono fired a 66 (−6) to capture the title by one shot over New Zealand's John Lister and Australia's David Graham.

This performance helped him earn his first special foreign invitation to the Masters Tournament that April. At Augusta, he shot a third round 68 (−4) put him in the top ten and a slight chance for the title. However he stumbled home on the final day and did not seriously contend for the championship, won by George Archer. This would be the beginning of a relatively long relationship with the event, however, as Kono would be invited to play in the tournament several more times. The following year, Kono played just as well, again shooting another 68 (this time in the second round) to place in the top ten once again where he remained after the third round. A final round 74 assured that he did not seriously contend on Sunday but he would pick up his best performance in a major championship. Kono would play in the event several more times in the early 1970s.

Kono continued to have success on the Japanese and Asian circuits, winning multiple events. He won the First Flight Tournament during the first official season of the Japan Golf Tour, but would not win again on the tour until a decade later at the Kanagawa Open.

== Professional wins (17) ==
=== PGA of Japan Tour wins (2) ===
No.	Date	Tournament	Winning score	Margin of victory	Runners-up
1	23 Sep 1973	First Flight Tournament	−18 (65-68-65=198) (Note: Shortened to 54 holes due to weather.)	6 strokes	(Philippines) Ben Arda, (Japan) Masashi Ozaki
2	24 Jul 1983	Kanagawa Open	−8 (64-72=136)	3 strokes	(Japan) Yurio Akitomi, (Japan) Satoshi Higashi, (Japan) Kazushige Kono

=== Asia Golf Circuit (3) ===
No.	Date	Tournament	Winning score	Margin of victory	Runner(s)-up
1	16 Mar 1969	Malaysian Open	−8 (72-70-72-66=280)	1 stroke	(Australia) David Graham, (New Zealand) John Lister
2	14 Mar 1971	Malaysian Open (2)	−19 (67-66-64-72=269)	2 strokes	(Australia) David Graham
3	5 Mar 1972	Singapore Open	−9 (67-70-74-68=279)	4 strokes	(Japan) Takashi Murakami

=== Other wins (12) ===
This list may be incomplete

- 1967 Nippon Series
- 1968 Japan Open, Nippon Series, Brazil Open
- 1969 Dunlop Tournament
- 1970 Champions Tournament, Grand Monarch, Rolex Tournament
- 1971 Champions Tournament, Grand Monarch
- 1972 Champions Tournament
- 1973 Champions Tournament

== Results in major championships ==
Tournament	1969	1970	1971	1972	1973
Masters Tournament	T13	T12	CUT	T19	T51

CUT = missed the half-way cut
"T" = tied
Note: Kono only played in the Masters Tournament.

== Team appearances ==
- World Cup (representing Japan): 1968, 1969, 1970, 1971, 1972
