= Ireneo Legaspi =

Filipino golfer

Ireneo Legaspi was a Filipino professional golfer who regularly campaigned in the Asia Golf Circuit from the mid-1960s to the mid-1970s.

Known to close friends and family as "Boyong", Legaspi played the tour with many other notable Filipino golfers of that period such as Ben Arda. His best-known victory was winning the Malaysian Open in 1967.

He also won several tournaments in the Philippine golf circuit, which regularly placed him among the top ten Filipino golfers at his peak in the 1970s.

Health problems took him out of the active professional circuit. He spent his later years teaching the game to numerous students, including free private lessons to several children in his hometown of Pasig. He continued as a teaching professional until his death in 2006.

== Professional wins (1) ==
=== Far East Circuit wins (1) ===
No.	Date	Tournament	Winning score	Margin of victory	Runners-up
1	12 Mar 1967	Malaysian Open	−2 (73-71-71-71=286)	1 stroke	(Japan) Toshiaki Sekimizu, (England) Guy Wolstenholme, (Japan) Haruo Yasuda

== Team appearances ==
Professional

- World Cup (representing the Philippines): 1968, 1972, 1973, 1974, 1980
