= Hideyo Sugimoto =

Japanese professional golfer

Personal information
- Nationality: Japan
- Born: 16 February 1938 (age 88) Tagata District, Shizuoka, Japan
- Height: 1.79 m (5 ft 10 in)
- Weight: 90 kg (200 lb; 14 st)

Career
- Sport: Golf
- Turned professional: 1959
- Former tours: Japan Golf Tour; PGA Tour; Asia Golf Circuit
- Professional wins: 18

Number of wins by tour
- Japan Golf Tour: 2
- Asian Tour: 3 (Asia Golf Circuit)
- Other: 16

Best results in major championships
- Masters Tournament: T35: 1968
- PGA Championship: DNP
- U.S. Open: CUT: 1968
- The Open Championship: DNP

Hideyo Sugimoto (born 16 February 1938) is a Japanese professional golfer.

== Early life ==
In 1938, Sugimoto was born in the Shizuoka Prefecture of Japan. He started to play golf at the age of 17.

== Professional career ==
In 1959, Sugimoto turned professional. In the mid-1960s, he had much success. One of his first successes was at the 1963 Yomiuri International, the final tournament of the year on the Asia Golf Circuit, where he finished runner-up to American Doug Sanders. Later in the year, in August, he recorded another runner-up performance against an international field, finishing solo second to Kel Nagle at the Lake Karrinyup Bowl in Perth, Australia. In 1965, he won the Japan Open Golf Championship, the country's national open.

As of March 1968, Sugimoto was under a one year suspension by the Japanese PGA. He attempted to make it onto the PGA Tour at Spring 1968 PGA Tour Qualifying School. He was successful. Sugimoto played in fourteen events during the year, including the Masters and U.S. Open. He made the cut in nine events, including the Masters.

In 1969, Sugimoto returned to Japan and had great success, winning six times in his home country and the Taiwan Open. During this era, Australian legend Peter Thomson considered Sugimoto and Kenji Hosoishi to be the best golfers in Japan.

During this the early 1970s, he had success with fellow Japanese professional Takashi Murakami, winning three events with him. Sugimoto's first win on the Japan Golf Tour, the 1973 All Nippon Doubles, was with Murakami. Sugimoto played on tour through the decade. One of his final top performances was at the 1978 Hiroshima Open where he finished second to Masashi Ozaki in a playoff.

== Professional wins (18) ==
=== PGA of Japan Tour wins (2) ===
No.	Date	Tournament	Winning score	Margin of victory	Runner(s)-up
1	29 Jul 1973	All Japan Doubles (with Takashi Murakami)	−26 (100-101-61=262)		
2	19 Aug 1973	Suntory Open	−14 (66-69-70-65=270)	1 stroke	(Japan) Masashi Ozaki

PGA of Japan Tour playoff record (0–1)

No.	Year	Tournament	Opponent	Result
1	1978	Hiroshima Open	(Japan) Masashi Ozaki	Lost to par on second extra hole

=== Asia Golf Circuit wins (3) ===
No.	Date	Tournament	Winning score	Margin of victory	Runner-up
1	6 Apr 1969	Taiwan Open	−4 (71-74-74-71=284)	Playoff	(Taiwan) Hsu Chi-san
2	27 Feb 1972	Philippine Open	−2 (72-72-71-71=286)	2 strokes	(Taiwan) Hsieh Yung-yo
3	18 Mar 1973	Malaysian Open	−11 (68-69-68-72=277)	2 strokes	(Australia) Graham Marsh

Asia Golf Circuit playoff record (1–1)

No.	Year	Tournament	Opponent	Result
1	1967	Singapore Open	(Philippines) Ben Arda	Lost to par on second extra hole
2	1969	Taiwan Open	(Taiwan) Hsu Chi-san	Won with par on first extra hole

=== Other wins (13) ===
- 1964 Japan Open, Yomiuri International (not an Asia Golf Circuit event in 1964)
- 1965 Grand Monarch
- 1966 Kanto Pro Championship, Golden Match
- 1969 Japan Open, All Nippon Doubles (with Takashi Murakami), Nippon Series, Aitaka Open, Rolex Tournament, Golden Match
- 1970 All Nippon Doubles (with Takashi Murakami), Kuzuha International

== Results in major championships ==
Tournament	1967	1968
Masters Tournament	CUT	T35
U.S. Open		CUT

Note: Sugimoto never played in The Open Championship or the PGA Championship.

Did not play

CUT = missed the half-way cut
"T" indicates a tie for a place

== Team appearances ==
- World Cup (representing Japan): 1965, 1966, 1967

== See also ==
- Spring 1968 PGA Tour Qualifying School graduates
