= 1967 Far East Circuit =

Golf tour season

1967 Far East Circuit season
- Duration: 23 February 1967 – 9 April 1967
- Number of official events: 7
- Order of Merit: (Taiwan) Lu Liang-Huan

The 1967 Far East Circuit was the sixth season of the Far East Circuit, the main professional golf tour in Asia since it was established in 1961.

== Schedule ==
The following table lists official events during the 1967 season.

Date	Tournament	Host country	Purse (US$)	Winner (Note: The number in brackets after each winner's name is the number of Far East Circuit events they had won up to and including that tournament. This information is only shown for Far East Circuit members.)	Notes
26 Feb	Philippine Open	Philippines	MS$104,000	(Taiwan) Hsu Sheng-san (a) (1)	
5 Mar	Singapore Open	Singapore	11,600	(Philippines) Ben Arda (2)	
12 Mar	Malaysian Open	Malaysia	15,000	(Philippines) Ireneo Legaspi (1)	
19 Mar	Thailand Open	Thailand	12,000	(Japan) Tomoo Ishii (4)	
26 Mar	Hong Kong Open	Hong Kong	12,000	(Australia) Peter Thomson (4)	
2 Apr	Taiwan Open	Taiwan	12,000	(Taiwan) Hsieh Yung-yo (4)	
9 Apr	Yomiuri International	Japan	15,000	(Japan) Mitsutaka Kono (1)	

=== Unofficial events ===
The following events were sanctioned by the Far East Circuit, but did not carry official money, nor were wins official.

Date	Tournament	Host country	Purse ($)	Winner	Notes
16 Apr	Indian Open	India		(Japan) Kenji Hosoishi	
23 Apr	Kenya Open	Kenya		(England) Guy Wolstenholme	

== Order of Merit ==
The Order of Merit was based on tournament results during the season, calculated using a points-based system.

Position	Player	Points
1	(Taiwan) Lu Liang-Huan	91
2	(Taiwan) Hsieh Yung-yo	
3	(Japan) Tomoo Ishii	
4	(Taiwan) Kuo Chie-Hsiung	
