= Yoshiro Hayashi (golfer) =

Japanese golfer

Personal information
- Nationality: Japan
- Born: 27 January 1922 Abiko, Chiba, Japan
- Died: 2 January 2012 (aged 89) Ibaraki Prefecture, Japan
- Height: 1.60 m (5 ft 3 in)
- Weight: 58 kg (128 lb; 9.1 st)

Career
- Sport: Golf
- Turned professional: 1938
- Professional wins: 12

Yoshiro Hayashi (林由郎, Hayashi Yoshirō; 27 January 1922 – 2 January 2012) was a Japanese golfer.

== Career ==
He turned pro at the age of 16 and continued with 12 post-war wins. Hayashi was considered one of the big top four Japanese golfers along with Isao Aoki, Masashi Ozaki and Akiko Fukushima.

He died at the age of 89 on 2 January 2012.

== Professional wins ==
this list is probably incomplete

- 1948 Kanto Pro Championship
- 1949 Japan PGA Championship
- 1950 Japan Open, Japan PGA Championship
- 1952 Yomiuri Pro
- 1953 Kanto Pro Championship
- 1954 Japan Open
- 1955 Kanto Open, Yomiuri Pro
- 1956 Japan PGA Championship
- 1960 Kanto Open
- 1961 Japan PGA Championship

== Team appearances ==
- Canada Cup (representing Japan): 1956
