= Yomiuri International =

Tournament information
- Location: Tokyo, Japan
- Established: 1962
- Course: Yomiuri Country Club
- Par: 72
- Tour: Asia Golf Circuit
- Format: Stroke play
- Month played: March/April
- Final year: 1971

Tournament record score
- Aggregate: 278 Peter Thomson (1962)
- To par: −10 as above

Final champion
- (Japan) Haruo Yasuda
- Location in Japan Location in Tokyo

The Yomiuri International was a golf tournament held in Japan from 1962 to 1971. It was played at the Yomiuri Country Club in Tokyo. It was an event on the Asia Golf Circuit (formerly the Far East Circuit) every year except for 1964, and served as the season finale.

In 1972, the tournament was cancelled by the sponsor, the Yomiuri Shimbun newspaper, because of political tensions and replaced on the circuit by the Sobu International Open.

Peter Thomson won the 1962 event, finishing eight strokes ahead of Canadian Al Balding. The following year the event was won by Doug Sanders, five ahead of Hideyo Sugimoto.

== Winners ==
Year	Tour (Note: AGC/FEC − Asia Golf Circuit/Far East Circuit.)	Winner	Score	To par	Margin of victory	Runner-up	Ref.
1971	AGC	(Japan) Haruo Yasuda	282	−6	Playoff (Note: Yasuda won with a bogey on the third hole of a sudden death playoff.)	(Japan) Kosaku Shimada	
1970	AGC	(Australia) David Graham	286	−2	3 strokes	(New Zealand) Walter Godfrey	
1969	AGC	(England) Guy Wolstenholme	288	E	1 stroke	(Japan) Teruo Sugihara	
1968	AGC	(Taiwan) Chen Ching-Po	283	−5	2 strokes	(Japan) Tomoo Ishii	
1967	FEC	(Japan) Mitsutaka Kono	282	−6	1 stroke	(Japan) Koichi Ono	
1966	FEC	(Republic of Ireland) Hugh Boyle	286	−2	2 strokes	(Australia) Ted Ball	
1965	FEC	(Australia) Frank Phillips	288	E	1 stroke	(Taiwan) Chen Ching-Po	
1964		(Japan) Hideyo Sugimoto					
1963	FEC	(United States) Doug Sanders	289	+1	5 strokes	(Japan) Hideyo Sugimoto	
1962	FEC	(Australia) Peter Thomson	278	−10	8 strokes	(Canada) Al Balding	
