= Shigeru Uchida (golfer) =

Japanese professional golfer

Personal information
- Nationality: Japan
- Born: 29 August 1937 (age 89) Shizuoka Prefecture, Japan
- Height: 1.70 m (5 ft 7 in)
- Weight: 70 kg (150 lb; 11 st)

Career
- Sport: Golf
- Status: Professional
- Former tour: Japan Golf Tour
- Professional wins: 40

Number of wins by tour
- Japan Golf Tour: 5
- Other: 35

Shigeru Uchida (born 29 August 1937) is a Japanese professional golfer.

== Professional career ==
Uchida played on the Japan Golf Tour, winning five times. He also won many other tournaments in Japan and enjoyed a successful senior career, during which he won the Japan PGA Senior Championship on two occasions.

== Professional wins (40) ==
=== PGA of Japan Tour wins (5) ===
No.	Date	Tournament	Winning score	Margin of victory	Runner-up
1	18 Sep 1977	Sanpo Classic	−7 (70-72-70-69=281)	4 strokes	(Japan) Tōru Nakamura
2	3 Aug 1980	JPGA East-West Tournament	−5 (69-66=135)	Playoff	(Japan) Kazuo Yoshikawa
3	6 Sep 1981	Chubu Open	−2 (71-72-65-70=278)	5 strokes	(Japan) Hisashi Suzumura
4	10 Jul 1982	Toyamaken Open	−8 (69-67=136)	Playoff	(Japan) Masaru Amono
5	5 Sep 1982	Chubu Open (2)	−6 (69-68-75-70=282)	6 strokes	(Japan) Masahiko Yamamoto

PGA of Japan Tour playoff record (2–1)

No.	Year	Tournament	Opponent(s)	Result
1	1976	Tokai Classic	(Japan) Isao Aoki, (Japan) Teruo Sugihara	Aoki won with birdie on first extra hole
2	1980	JPGA East-West Tournament	(Japan) Kazuo Yoshikawa	
2	1982	Toyamaken Open	(Japan) Masaru Amono	

=== Asia Golf Circuit wins (1) ===
No.	Date	Tournament	Winning score	Margin of victory	Runner-up
1	22 Apr 1973	Sobu International Open	−9 (70-66-69-74=279)	Playoff	(Japan) Masashi Ozaki

Asia Golf Circuit playoff record (1–0)

No.	Year	Tournament	Opponent	Result
1	1973	Sobu International Open	(Japan) Masashi Ozaki	Won with eagle on third extra hole

=== Other wins (14) ===
- 1966 Chunichi Crowns
- 1968 Kansai Circuit Nagasaki Series
- 1969 Kansai Open, All Star Tournament
- 1970 Kansai Circuit Nagasaki Series
- 1971 Tokai Classic, Chubu Open, All Nippon Doubles Tournament (with Hiroshi Ishii), Asahi International
- 1974 Mizuno Open
- 1975 Mizuno Open, Sanpo Champions Tournament
- 1978 All Star Tournament
- 1982 KSB Kagawa Open

=== Senior wins (20) ===
- 1987 Kansai Professional Senior Championship, Dai-ichi Life Cup, Phoenix Cup
- 1988 Kansai Professional Senior Championship
- 1988 Hazama Classic
- 1989 Yanase Cup, Hazama Classic
- 1990 Yanase Cup, Hazama Classic, Imperial Wing Gold Cup
- 1991 Yanase Cup, Dai-ichi Life Cup
- 1992 Crane Cup Kansai Professional Senior Championship, Maruman Senior Tournament
- 1993 Japan PGA Senior Championship
- 1994 Japan PGA Senior Championship
- 1997 Japan PGA Grand Senior Championship
- 1998 Kansai Pro Grand Senior Championship
- 1999 Japan Grand Senior Golf Tournament
- 2007 Kansai Pro Golf Gold Senior Championship

== Team appearances ==
- World Cup (representing Japan): 1978

== See also ==
- List of male golfers
