= Lu Liang-Huan =

Taiwanese professional golfer (1936–2022)

Lu Liang-Huan 呂良煥
Personal information
- Nickname: Mister Lu
- Nationality: Taiwan
- Born: 10 December 1936 Taipei, Taiwan, Japan
- Died: 15 March 2022 (aged 85) Taipei, Taiwan
- Height: 1.72 m (5 ft 8 in)
- Weight: 65 kg (143 lb; 10.2 st)

Career
- Sport: Golf
- Turned professional: 1956
- Former tours: Japan Golf Tour; Asia Golf Circuit
- Professional wins: 29

Number of wins by tour
- Japan Golf Tour: 8
- Other: 21

Best results in major championships
- Masters Tournament: 37th: 1972
- PGA Championship: DNP
- U.S. Open: DNP
- The Open Championship: 2nd: 1971

Achievements and awards
- Far East Circuit Order of Merit winner: 1966, 1967

Lu Liang-Huan
- Traditional Chinese: 呂良煥
- Simplified Chinese: 吕良焕
Transcriptions
Standard Mandarin
- Hanyu Pinyin: Lǚ Liánghuàn
- IPA: [lỳ ljǎŋ.xwân]
Southern Min
- Hokkien POJ: Lū Liông-hoàn

Lu Liang-Huan (Chinese: 呂良煥, 10 December 1936 – 15 March 2022), also known as Mister Lu (Mr Lu) to British golf fans, was a successful Taiwanese golfer who won several important tournaments on the Asian and European circuits between 1959 and 1987.

== Career ==
In 1936, Lu was born in Taipei.

In 1959, Lu won the inaugural Hong Kong Open. He would become a regular winner on the Far East Circuit, later known as the Asia Golf Circuit, winning his own country's national Open on four occasions and the overall circuit title in 1966 and 1967. He also played on the Japan Golf Tour, winning nine times between 1971 and 1987.

His finest year was 1971, when he finished runner-up to Lee Trevino in The Open at Royal Birkdale, then the following week won the Open de France at Biarritz, becoming the first Taiwanese and Asian golfer to win on the European Tour. He also won in Thailand and Japan that season. In 1972, he and countryman Hsieh Min-Nan teamed up to win the World Cup at Royal Melbourne Golf Club, Taiwan's sole victory in the event.

== Personal life ==
Lu's nephew, Lu Hsi-chuen, also had a successful career as a professional golfer.

Lu died at Taipei Veterans General Hospital on 15 March 2022, at the age of 85.

== Professional wins (29) ==
=== PGA of Japan Tour wins (8) ===
No.	Date	Tournament	Winning score	Margin of victory	Runner(s)-up
1	3 Jun 1973	World Friendship	−12 (69-73-65-69=276)	Playoff	(Japan) Isao Aoki, (Australia) Graham Marsh
2	21 Apr 1974	Sobu International Open^{1}	−8 (71-71-68-70=280)	4 strokes	(Japan) Masashi Ozaki, (Japan) Fumio Tanaka
3	1 Sep 1974	Hiroshima Open	−16 (68-68-67-69=272)	1 stroke	(Japan) Takashi Murakami
4	11 May 1975	Fujisankei Classic	−8 (71-71-68-70=280)	4 strokes	(Australia) Graham Marsh
5	31 Aug 1975	Hiroshima Open (2)	−13 (66-65-72-72=275)	Playoff	(Japan) Tōru Nakamura, (Japan) Kosaku Shimada
6	26 Jun 1977	Shizuoka Open	−5 (68-71-72-70=283)	Playoff	(Japan) Yasuhiro Miyamoto
7	21 Aug 1983	Acom Doubles (with (Taiwan) Lu Hsi-chuen)	−27 (64-66-66-65=261)	Playoff	(Japan) Hajime Meshiai and (Japan) Masashi Ozaki
8	22 Mar 1987	Shizuoka Open (2)	−8 (71-74-69-66=280)	2 strokes	(Japan) Nobumitsu Yuhara

^{1}Co-sanctioned by the Asia Golf Circuit

PGA of Japan Tour playoff record (4–1)

No.	Year	Tournament	Opponent(s)	Result
1	1973	World Friendship	(Japan) Isao Aoki, (Australia) Graham Marsh	Won with birdie on first extra hole
2	1975	Hiroshima Open	(Japan) Tōru Nakamura, (Japan) Kosaku Shimada	Won two-hole aggregate playoff; Lu: E (3-4=7), Nakamura: +2 (5-4=9), Shimada: +2 (4-5=9)
3	1976	Fujisankei Classic	(Japan) Norio Suzuki	Lost to par on fifth extra hole
4	1977	Shizuoka Open	(Japan) Yasuhiro Miyamoto	
5	1983	Acom Doubles (with (Taiwan) Lu Hsi-chuen)	(Japan) Hajime Meshiai and (Japan) Masashi Ozaki	Won with birdie on third extra hole

=== Asia Golf Circuit wins (10) ===
No.	Date	Tournament	Winning score	Margin of victory	Runner(s)-up
1	28 Feb 1965	Philippine Open	E (69-73-75-71=288)	2 strokes	(Taiwan) Hsieh Yung-yo
2	3 Apr 1966	Taiwan Open	−7 (71-71-69-70=281)	2 strokes	(Taiwan) Chen Chien-chung, (Taiwan) Hsu Chi-san, (Taiwan) Kuo Chie-Hsiung
3	28 Mar 1971	Thailand Open	−10 (70-69-70-69=278)	1 stroke	(United States) David Oakley
4	17 Feb 1974	Philippine Open (2)	−11 (73-70-71-67=281)	Playoff	(Taiwan) Hsu Sheng-san
5	24 Feb 1974	Hong Kong Open	E (70-70-70-70=280)	Playoff	(Australia) Graham Marsh
6	21 Apr 1974	Sobu International Open^{1}	−8 (71-71-68-70=280)	4 strokes	(Japan) Masashi Ozaki, (Japan) Fumio Tanaka
7	19 Feb 1978	Philippine Open (3)	−9 (68-71-73-66=278)	7 strokes	(Taiwan) Kuo Chie-Hsiung
8	8 Apr 1979	Taiwan Open (2)	−1 (70-72-71-74=287)	2 strokes	(Taiwan) Chen Tze-ming
9	10 Apr 1983	Taiwan Open (3)	+7 (75-73-75-72=295)	Playoff	(United States) Bill Israelson
10	14 Apr 1985	Taiwan Open (4)	−6 (73-71-67-71=282)	Playoff	(Mexico) Rafael Alarcón, (Taiwan) Hsieh Yu-shu

^{1}Co-sanctioned by the PGA of Japan Tour

Asia Golf Circuit playoff record (4–2)

No.	Year	Tournament	Opponent(s)	Result
1	1966	Singapore Open	(New Zealand) Ross Newdick, (Scotland) George Will	Newdick won with birdie on second extra hole
2	1967	Taiwan Open	(Taiwan) Hsieh Yung-yo	Lost to birdie on first extra hole
3	1974	Philippine Open	(Taiwan) Hsu Sheng-san	Won with par on first extra hole
4	1974	Hong Kong Open	(Australia) Graham Marsh	Won with birdie on third extra hole
5	1983	Taiwan Open	(United States) Bill Israelson	Won three-hole aggregate playoff; Lu: E (4-3-5=12), Israelson: +3 (5-3-7=15)
6	1985	Taiwan Open	(Mexico) Rafael Alarcón, (Taiwan) Hsieh Yu-shu	Won with par on sixth extra hole Hsieh eliminated by par on first hole

=== Other Japan wins (4) ===
- 1971 The Crowns Tournament
- 1972 Kuzuha International
- 1973 Hokuriku Classic
- 1976 Sanpo Champions Tournament

=== Other Taiwan wins (6) ===
- 1970 Republic of China PGA Championship
- 1975 Republic of China PGA Championship
- 1977 Republic of China PGA Championship
- 1979 Republic of China PGA Championship, Kaohsiung Open
- 1987 Xinfeng Open

=== Other wins (4) ===
- 1959 Hong Kong Open
- 1971 French Open
- 1972 World Cup (team with Hsieh Min-Nan), Panama Open

== Playoff record ==
New Zealand Golf Circuit playoff record (0–1)

No.	Year	Tournament	Opponent	Result
1	1972	Otago Charity Classic	(United States) Johnny Miller	Lost to birdie on first extra hole

== Results in major championships ==
Tournament	1964	1965	1966	1967	1968	1969	1970	1971	1972	1973	1974	1975
Masters Tournament						CUT			37	T43		T43
The Open Championship	T24							2	T40		T5	T53

Note: Lu only played in the Masters Tournament and The Open Championship.

Top 10
Did not play

CUT = missed the half-way cut
"T" indicates a tie for a place

== Team appearances ==
- World Cup (representing Chinese Taipei): 1956, 1962, 1966, 1967, 1968, 1971, 1972, 1973, 1974, 1980
- Dunhill Cup (representing Taiwan): 1985
