= Koichi Ono =

Japanese professional golfer

Personal information
- Nationality: Japan
- Born: 19 May 1919 Dalian, Manchuria
- Died: 6 November 2000 (aged 81)

Career
- Sport: Golf
- Status: Professional
- Professional wins: 12

Best results in major championships
- Masters Tournament: CUT: 1958, 1963
- PGA Championship: DNP
- U.S. Open: DNP
- The Open Championship: DNP

Achievements and awards
- Japan Professional Golf Hall of Fame: 2012

Koichi Ono (小野 光一, Ono Kōichi; 19 May 1919 – 6 November 2000), born Son Shi-Kin in Dalian, Manchuria (now China), was a Japanese professional golfer. He was one of the leading golfers on the Japanese circuit during the 1950s, winning the Japan Open Golf Championship three times and representing Japan on four occasions in the Canada Cup.

== Professional career ==
Ono won many tournaments in Japan including the Japan Open Golf Championship, the nation's most prestigious tournament, in 1951, 1953 and 1955, and the Kanto Pro Championship five times. He also won the Japan PGA Championship in 1955. Around this time in his career he became naturalized and changed his name to Koichi Ono.

Ono is best known for his performance in the 1957 Canada Cup. Ono and his playing partner Torakichi Nakamura were hosts at the event, held at Kasumigaseki Country Club in Japan. The Canada Cup, a precursor to the World Cup, featured an elite field that included Sam Snead, Gary Player, and Peter Thomson. Nakamura and Ono won the event, and won easily, defeating Americans Jimmy Demaret and Snead by nine shots. The American sportswriter Herbert Warren Wind, writing in Sports Illustrated, compared it to Francis Ouimet's famous upset victory at the 1913 U.S. Open. The event was widely televised in Japan and helped spur a golfing boom in the country.

This good play helped Ono and Nakamura receive special foreign invitations to the 1958 Masters Tournament. They were the first non-white players to play at the Masters.

Ono continued to play well throughout the late 1950s and early 1960s, winning the Kanto Pro Championship an additional four times.

== Awards and honors ==
In 2012, Ono was inducted into the Japan Professional Golf Hall of Fame.

== Professional wins (12) ==
- 1949 Kanto Pro Championship
- 1951 Japan Open Golf Championship
- 1953 Japan Open Golf Championship
- 1954 Yomiuri Pro Championship
- 1955 Japan Open Golf Championship, Japan PGA Championship
- 1957 Canada Cup (team event with Torakichi Nakamura), Yomiuri Pro Championship
- 1958 Kanto Pro Championship
- 1959 Kanto Pro Championship
- 1962 Kanto Pro Championship
- 1963 Kanto Pro Championship

== Team appearances ==
- Canada Cup (representing Japan): 1955, 1957 (winners), 1958, 1960
