= Tomoo Ishii =

Japanese professional golfer (1923–2022)

Personal information
- Nationality: Japan
- Born: 9 June 1923 Shizuoka Prefecture, Japan
- Died: 24 January 2022 (aged 98)
- Height: 167 cm (5 ft 6 in)
- Weight: 65 kg (143 lb)

Career
- Sport: Golf
- Status: Professional
- Professional wins: 10

Best results in major championships
- Masters Tournament: T26: 1965
- PGA Championship: DNP
- U.S. Open: DNP
- The Open Championship: DNP

Tomoo Ishii (石井 朝夫, Ishii Tomoo) (9 June 1923 – 24 January 2022) was a Japanese professional golfer.

== Professional career ==
Ishii was born in Shizuoka Prefecture, Japan, and started playing golf at the age of 15. Ishii won a number of events on the Japanese and Asian circuits through the 1950s and 1960s. One of his top triumphs was at the 1964 Capitol Hills Open in Manila, Philippines on the Far East Circuit. Ishii was tied for the lead with Australian golfer Peter Thomson at the beginning of the fourth round. He outshot Thomson by four strokes over the course of the final round to win.

His good play helped him earn three consecutive special foreign invitations to the Masters in the mid-1960s. He was one of the first Asian players to play in the event. He made the cut the first two years. He also represented Japan in the Canada Cup in 1963 and 1964.

== Personal life and death ==
Ishii died on 24 January 2022, at the age of 98.

== Professional wins (10) ==
=== Far East Circuit wins (4) ===
No.	Date	Tournament	Winning score	Margin of victory	Runner(s)-up
1	1 Mar 1964	Capitol Hills Open	−4 (69-72-70-69=280)	2 strokes	(Philippines) Ben Arda
2	15 Mar 1964	Malayan Open	−14 (70-75-70-67=282)	1 stroke	(Wales) Brian Huggett, (Japan) Tadashi Kitta
3	14 Mar 1965	Malayan Open (2)	−10 (71-73-70-68=282)	2 strokes	(Taiwan) Lu Liang-Huan, (England) Guy Wolstenholme
4	19 Mar 1967	Thailand Open	−5 (72-73-67-71=283)	2 strokes	(England) Tony Jacklin, (Taiwan) Kuo Chie-Hsiung

=== Other wins (6) ===
- 1953 Yomiuri Pro Championship
- 1961 Chunichi Crowns
- 1963 Kanto Open, Golf Nippon Series
- 1965 Kanto Open
- 1977 Japan PGA Senior Championship

== Results in major championships ==
Tournament	1964	1965	1966
Masters Tournament	T40	T26	CUT

CUT = missed the half-way cut
"T" = tied for place
Note: Ishii only played in the Masters Tournament.

== Team appearances ==
- Canada Cup (representing Japan): 1963, 1964
