= Tadashi Kitta =

Japanese professional golfer

Personal information
- Nationality: Japan
- Born: 20 April 1934 Hyōgo Prefecture, Japan
- Died: 22 March 2003 (aged 68)
- Height: 1.64 m (5 ft 5 in)
- Weight: 58 kg (128 lb; 9.1 st)

Career
- Sport: Golf
- Status: Professional
- Former tour: Japan Golf Tour
- Professional wins: 27

Number of wins by tour
- Japan Golf Tour: 2
- Other: 25

Best results in major championships
- Masters Tournament: DNP
- PGA Championship: DNP
- U.S. Open: DNP
- The Open Championship: CUT: 1970, 1971

Tadashi Kitta (橘田 規, Kitta Tadashi; 20 April 1934 - 22 March 2003) was a Japanese professional golfer.

== Career ==
Kitta played on the Japan Golf Tour, winning twice. He won a dozen tournaments in Japan prior to the formation of the Japan Golf Tour and also won the Thailand Open in 1966.

== Professional wins (27) ==
=== PGA of Japan Tour wins (2) ===
No.	Date	Tournament	Winning score	Margin of victory	Runner-up
1	12 Jul 1974	Chubu Open	−6 (70-75-65-72=282)		
2	15 May 1977	Japan PGA Match-Play Championship	1 up		(Japan) Tōru Nakamura

=== Far East Circuit wins (1) ===
No.	Date	Tournament	Winning score	Margin of victory	Runner-up
1	20 Mar 1966	Thailand Open	−5 (70-69-74-70=283)	2 strokes	(South Africa) Harold Henning

=== Other wins (20) ===
- 1957 Kansai Pro Championship
- 1958 Kansai Open
- 1960 Yomiuri Pro Championship
- 1962 Chunichi Crowns, Kansai Open
- 1963 Japan PGA Championship, Kansai Open
- 1964 Japan PGA Championship, Golden Match
- 1965 Japan Open, Chunichi Crowns, Golden Match, Woodlawn Invitational
- 1966 Kansai Pro Championship, Kuzuha International
- 1967 Japan Open
- 1968 West Japan Circuit Shimonoseki leg
- 1969 Kuzuha International
- 1971 Rolex Tournament
- 1972 Chubu Open

=== Senior wins (4) ===
- 1985 Kansai Pro Senior Championship
- 1986 Japan PGA Senior Championship, Kansai Pro Senior Championship
- 1994 Kansai Pro Grand Senior

== Team appearances ==
- Canada Cup (representing Japan): 1962, 1963, 1964, 1965
