= Ben Arda =

Filipino golfer

Personal information
- Nicknames: Bantam Ben, Toy Tiger, Mighty Mouse
- Nationality: Philippines
- Born: 13 June 1929 Cebu, Philippine Islands
- Died: 20 December 2006 (aged 77)
- Height: 1.69 m (5 ft 7 in)

Career
- Sport: Golf
- Status: Professional
- Former tours: PGA of Japan Tour; Asia Golf Circuit
- Professional wins: 15

Number of wins by tour
- Japan Golf Tour: 4
- Asian Tour: 8 (Asia Golf Circuit)
- Other: 5

Best results in major championships
- Masters Tournament: CUT: 1962
- PGA Championship: DNP
- U.S. Open: DNP
- The Open Championship: CUT: 1972

Achievements and awards
- Asia Golf Circuit Order of Merit winner: 1970

Ben Arda (13 June 1929 – 20 December 2006) was a Filipino professional golfer.

== Professional career ==
Arda, known as Bantam Ben and the Toy Tiger because of his small stature, was one of Asia's leading golfers during the 1960s and 1970s. He was the first Filipino to qualify for the Masters Tournament and The Open Championship. He won nine tournaments on the Asia Golf Circuit, including the Philippine Open three times, and headed the points list in 1970. He also won four times on the Japan Golf Tour and played in the World Cup 16 times, recording a best finish of 2nd place in 1977 with playing partner Rudy Lavares.

== Professional wins (15) ==
=== PGA of Japan Tour wins (4) ===
No.	Date	Tournament	Winning score	Margin of victory	Runner(s)-up
1	27 May 1973	Dunlop Tournament	−8 (71-69-70-70=280)	4 strokes	(Japan) Masashi Ozaki
2	30 Sep 1973	Japan Open Golf Championship	−11 (68-74-69-66=277)	2 strokes	(Japan) Isao Aoki
3	25 Apr 1976	Sobu International Open^{1}	−11 (69-68-70-70=277)	4 strokes	(Taiwan) Chen Chien-chung
4	24 Apr 1977	Dunlop International Open^{1} (2)	−6 (72-71-67-72=282)	2 strokes	(New Zealand) Terry Kendall, (Japan) Tsuneyuki Nakajima

^{1}Co-sanctioned by the Asia Golf Circuit

=== Asia Golf Circuit wins (8) ===
No.	Date	Tournament	Winning score	Margin of victory	Runner(s)-up
1	17 Feb 1963	Philippine Open	+1 (71-74-74-70=289)	3 strokes	(Japan) Teruo Sugihara
2	5 Mar 1967	Singapore Open	−2 (70-69-71-72=282)	Playoff	(Japan) Hideyo Sugimoto
3	8 Mar 1970	Malaysian Open	−15 (69-68-68-68=273)	1 stroke	(Australia) Tim Woolbank
4	11 Mar 1973	Singapore Open (2)	E (71-68-72-73=284)	Playoff	(Scotland) Norman Wood
5	17 Mar 1974	Indonesia Open	−5 (73-71-70-69=283)	Playoff	(Taiwan) Hsu Chi-san, (Australia) Graham Marsh
6	7 Mar 1976	Thailand Open	−18 (66-70-65-69=270)	4 strokes	(Thailand) Sukree Onsham
7	25 Apr 1976	Sobu International Open^{1}	−11 (69-68-70-70=277)	4 strokes	(Taiwan) Chen Chien-chung
8	24 Apr 1977	Dunlop International Open^{1} (2)	−6 (72-71-67-72=282)	2 strokes	(New Zealand) Terry Kendall, (Japan) Tsuneyuki Nakajima

^{1}Co-sanctioned by the PGA of Japan Tour

Asia Golf Circuit playoff record (3–1)

No.	Year	Tournament	Opponent(s)	Result
1	1967	Singapore Open	(Japan) Hideyo Sugimoto	Won with par on second extra hole
2	1973	Singapore Open	(Scotland) Norman Wood	Won with par on third extra hole
3	1974	Indonesia Open	(Taiwan) Hsu Chi-san, (Australia) Graham Marsh	Won with par on sixth extra hole Hsu eliminated by par on first hole
4	1975	Taiwan Open	(Taiwan) Hsieh Min-Nan, (Taiwan) Kuo Chie-Hsiung	Kuo won with birdie on fourth extra hole

=== Other wins (5) ===
This list may be incomplete

- 1961 Philippine Open
- 1969 Indian Open
- 1976 Philippine Masters
- 1977 Philippine Masters
- 1979 Philippine Open

== Results in major championships ==
Tournament	1962	1963	1964	1965	1966	1967	1968	1969	1970	1971	1972
Masters Tournament	CUT										
The Open Championship											CUT

Did not play

CUT = missed the half-way cut (3rd round cut in 1972 Open Championship)
Note: Arda never played in the U.S. Open or the PGA Championship.

== Team appearances ==
This list is incomplete

- World Cup (representing the Philippines): 1956, 1958, 1960, 1961, 1962, 1963, 1964, 1965, 1966, 1967, 1969, 1970, 1971, 1972, 1975, 1977
