= Hsu Sheng-san =

Taiwanese golfer (born 1942)

Personal information
- Nationality: Taiwan
- Born: 16 April 1942 (age 84)

Career
- Sport: Golf
- Turned professional: 1969
- Former tours: PGA of Japan Tour; Asia Golf Circuit
- Professional wins: 18

Number of wins by tour
- Japan Golf Tour: 1
- Asian Tour: 7 (Asia Golf Circuit)
- Other: 10

Best results in major championships
- Masters Tournament: DNP
- PGA Championship: DNP
- U.S. Open: 70th: 1983
- The Open Championship: T51: 1982

Achievements and awards
- Asia Golf Circuit Order of Merit winner: 1976, 1978, 1982

Hsu Sheng-san (Chinese: 許勝三, born 16 April 1942) is a Taiwanese professional golfer.

== Amateur career ==
Hsu's first two victories in professional tournaments were as an amateur, in 1966 at the Okinawa Open, and in 1967 at the Philippine Open.

== Professional career ==
Outside of Taiwan, Hsu played primarily on the Asia Golf Circuit winning seven tournaments and heading the Order of Merit in 1976, 1978 and 1982. His 1982 campaign started by losing out in a playoff at the opening event, the Philippine Open, having held a five stroke lead going into the final round, but he went on to win in India, Singapore and Thailand in consecutive weeks through the middle of the circuit to build a dominant position in the standings. Hsu also played on the Japan Golf Tour, winning once.

== Professional wins (18) ==
=== PGA of Japan Tour wins (1) ===
No.	Date	Tournament	Winning score	Margin of victory	Runners-up
1	5 Jun 1977	Mitsubishi Galant Tournament	−11 (68-68-69-72=277)	3 strokes	(Japan) Takaaki Kono, (Australia) Graham Marsh, (Japan) Teruo Sugihara

=== Other Japan wins (1) ===
- 1966 Okinawa Open (as an amateur)

=== Asia Golf Circuit wins (7) ===
No.	Date	Tournament	Winning score	Margin of victory	Runner-up
1	26 Feb 1967	Philippine Open (as an amateur)	−5 (74-73-69-67=283)	1 stroke	(Philippines) Celestino Tugot
2	16 Mar 1975	Indonesia Open	−11 (71-70-70-66=277)	6 strokes	(Taiwan) Hsieh Min-Nan
3	28 Mar 1976	Malaysian Open	−9 (71-72-67-69=279)	Playoff	(Myanmar) Mya Aye
4	5 Mar 1978	Thailand Open	−8 (69-68-72-71=280)	3 strokes	(United States) Bruce Douglass
5	14 Mar 1982	Thailand Open (2)	−7 (70-73-72-66=281)	Playoff	(Taiwan) Shen Chung-shyan
6	21 Mar 1982	Indian Open	−15 (70-70-68-69=277)	3 strokes	(Japan) Ikuo Shirahama
7	28 Mar 1982	Singapore Open	−10 (68-67-68-71=274)	5 strokes	(Australia) Terry Gale

Asia Golf Circuit playoff record (2–4)

No.	Year	Tournament	Opponent(s)	Result
1	1974	Philippine Open	(Taiwan) Lu Liang-Huan	Lost to par on first extra hole
2	1976	Malaysian Open	(Myanmar) Mya Aye	Won with par on third extra hole
3	1979	Singapore Open	(Taiwan) Lu Hsi-chuen	Lost after concession on second extra hole
4	1982	Philippine Open	(Taiwan) Hsieh Min-Nan	Lost to par on third extra hole
5	1982	Thailand Open	(Taiwan) Shen Chung-shyan	Won after concession on first extra hole
6	1987	Singapore Open	(Australia) Peter Fowler, (United States) Jeff Maggert	Fowler won with birdie on third extra hole

=== Taiwan wins (9) ===
- 1969 ROC PGA Championship
- 1976 ROC PGA Championship
- 1980 Kaohsiung Open
- 1981 ROC PGA Championship, Kaohsiung Open
- 1982 Kaohsiung Open
- 1984 Kaohsiung Open
- 1985 ROC PGA Championship
- 1987 ROC PGA Championship

== Team appearances ==
Amateur

- Eisenhower Trophy (representing Taiwan): 1964, 1966, 1968

Professional

- World Cup (representing Taiwan): 1976, 1978, 1988
