= 1979 Asia Golf Circuit =

Golf tour season

1979 Asia Golf Circuit season
- Duration: 22 February 1979 – 22 April 1979
- Number of official events: 9
- Most wins: (Taiwan) Lu Hsi-chuen (3)
- Order of Merit: (Taiwan) Lu Hsi-chuen

The 1979 Asia Golf Circuit was the 18th season of the Asia Golf Circuit (formerly the Far East Circuit), the main professional golf tour in Asia since it was established in 1961.

== Changes for 1979 ==
The Philippine Open was withdrawn from the circuit due to non-payment of contributions towards the overall circuit fund, however the tournament did go ahead but did not count for the circuit standings. Along with Thailand, the Philippines had also not been forthcoming with their contributions for the previous season. After the tournament, the Philippines announced their intention to reschedule the Philippine Open to December and possibly rejoin the circuit with the Philippine Masters, an invitational event which had served as warm-up event for the circuit since its inauguration in 1976, however they ultimately rejoined the circuit for the 1980 season with the same tournament schedules.

== Schedule ==
The following table lists official events during the 1979 season.

Date	Tournament	Host country	Purse (US$)	Winner (Note: The number in brackets after each winner's name is the number of Asia Golf Circuit events they had won up to and including that tournament. This information is only shown for Asia Golf Circuit members.)	Other tours (Note: JPN − PGA of Japan Tour.)	Notes
25 Feb	Cathay Pacific Hong Kong Open	Hong Kong	100,000	(Australia) Greg Norman (n/a)		
4 Mar	Singapore Open	Singapore	50,000	(Taiwan) Lu Hsi-chuen (1)		
11 Mar	Malaysian Open	Malaysia	60,000	(Taiwan) Lu Hsi-chuen (2)		
18 Mar	Thailand Open	Thailand	40,000	(United States) Mike Krantz (1)		
25 Mar	Indian Open	India	30,000	(United States) Gaylord Burrows (2)		
1 Apr	Indonesia Open	Indonesia	45,000	(Taiwan) Lu Hsi-chuen (3)		
8 Apr	Taiwan Open	Taiwan	50,000	(Taiwan) Lu Liang-Huan (8)		
15 Apr	Korea Open	South Korea	60,000	(Taiwan) Shen Chung-shyan (1)		
22 Apr	Dunlop International Open	Japan	100,000	(Japan) Hiroshi Ishii (n/a)	JPN	

=== Unofficial events ===
The following events were sanctioned by the Asia Golf Circuit, but did not carry official money, nor were wins official.

Date	Tournament	Host country	Purse ($)	Winner	Notes
11 Feb	Philippine Masters	Philippines	55,000	(Myanmar) Mya Aye	Limited-field event
18 Feb	Philippine Open	Philippines	100,000	(Philippines) Ben Arda	

== Order of Merit ==
The Order of Merit was based on tournament results during the season, calculated using a points-based system.

Position	Player	Points
1	(Taiwan) Lu Hsi-chuen	142
2	(Taiwan) Hsu Chi-san	109
3	(Taiwan) Hsu Sheng-san	84
4	(Taiwan) Kuo Chie-Hsiung	83
5	(Myanmar) Mya Aye	78
