= Hsu Chi-san =

Taiwanese golfer (born 1938)

Personal information
- Nationality: Taiwan
- Born: 17 January 1938 (age 88)

Career
- Sport: Golf
- Status: Professional
- Former tour: Asia Golf Circuit
- Professional wins: 14

Number of wins by tour
- Asian Tour: 3 (Asia Golf Circuit)
- Other: 11

Best results in major championships
- Masters Tournament: DNP
- PGA Championship: DNP
- U.S. Open: DNP
- The Open Championship: T21: 1976

Hsu Chi-san (born 17 January 1938) is a Taiwanese professional golfer. During his career he won many tournaments in the Asia-Pacific region, including the Philippine, Taiwan and Singapore national opens on the Asia Golf Circuit.

== Career ==
Hsu's first notable performances were at his national open, the Taiwan Open. He won the event in 1965. He attempted to defend his championship the following year and was successful early, holding a share of the lead after the first round. However, he ultimately lost the title to countryman Lu Liang-Huan.

In the mid-1960s, Hsu also started playing on the Asia Golf Circuit. He shot an opening round 68 (−4) at the 1967 Thailand Open to take a two shot. He ultimately finished in a tie for fourth place, five behind the champion Tomoo Ishii and one shot behind runner-up finishers Kuo Chie-Hsiung and Tony Jacklin. His first win on the Asian circuit came the following year at the 1968 Philippine Open, where he opened 72−69−68 to hold a four shot lead after three rounds. He extended that lead in the final round, birdieing 4 of the first 8 holes on Sunday to build a 10-shot lead. He shot a final round 69 (−3) to finish eight shots ahead of Japan's Shigeru Uchida. The following April, he came close to winning the Taiwan Open again. Having tied competitor Hideyo Sugimoto at the end of regulation play, Hsu made a bogey at the first playoff hole to finish second.

These performances would help Hsu qualify for Taiwan's 1969 World Cup team. Taiwan's team was among the favorites to win the cup. Hsu and teammate Hsieh Yung-yo led the way after the first 36 holes with a 277 total, and eventually finished in a tie for fourth.

Hsu went several years without winning a tournament or receiving substantial media coverage. He started to have some success again, however, in the mid-1970s. He held the lead after the first round of the 1973 Thailand Open with Walter Godfrey and Japan's Akio Toyoda. The following year he finished the 1974 Indonesia Open tied in regulation with Australian Graham Marsh and Filipino Ben Arda. Arda won the event on the first playoff hole. In 1975, he held the lead with John Sullivan after the first round of the Malaysian Dunlop Masters. In the next round, he broke the record at the Subang National, shooting a 69 (−3) to take the solo lead. He went on to win the event by three. One year later, he played excellently at the 1976 Taiwan Open, taking the second round lead. He went on to win. He took the lead in the Asia Golf Circuit's Order of Merit standing with the win. Later in the year he would play in his first major championship, the 1976 Open Championship. Hsu shot an 81 (+9) in the first round to put himself outside of the cut line. However, he shot a second round 69 to make the cut by two shots. He finished 71−72 over the final two days. He finished in a tie for 21st. His performance over the final three days was better than all players except Johnny Miller, Jack Nicklaus, Raymond Floyd, and Vicente Fernández.

The 1977 year would also be successful. That March he played excellently at the Singapore Open. Staving off challengers Ben Arda, Mya Aye, and Tomoni Suzuki, the veteran Hsu would play "steady" golf amidst the "tense" environment and win by one shot. Later in the year, he again played in the British Open with some success. At the 1977 Open Championship he opened with an even-par 70 to place in the top ten. In the second round he again shot 70. He remained in the top-10 and was only three shots back of Roger Maltbie's lead. He then shot a third round 77 to fall out of contention. However, he would make the third round cut easily, by five shots. In the final round he would shoot a very disappointing 81 and finish at 298 (+18), in a tie for 58th.

In the late 1970s he would again have some success in Asia. In 1978 he played excellently at the Asia Golf Circuit's unofficial opener, the Philippine Masters, shooting two-under in "high winds" to win by one. The following year, he would seriously compete at the Hong Kong Open. He was in second place after the first round, one behind Australian Graham Marsh. He continued to play well and was tied for the third round lead with Lu Hsi-chuen. However, both he and Lu shot 74 (+4) in the 4th round and were usurped by Greg Norman. Hsu finished joint runner-up with Lu and fellow Taiwanese Chen Tze-ming, three back of Norman.

In the early 1980s he played well at two events on the Singapore circuit. In 1980 he won the Singapore PGA Championship. The following year he held the midway lead at the 1981 Rolex Masters. He went on to win the event. A month later, he recorded one of his final high finishes on the Asia Golf Circuit, finishing runner-up to Payne Stewart at the Indonesia Open.

Very late in his regular career, he had some highlights. He finished joint runner-up at the 1986 PGA of Singapore championship, six behind Mario Siodina. He also took the first round lead at that year's Singapore PGA Championship. In 1988, he turned 50 and was eligible for the senior circuit. He won three senior events in Japan in the late 1980s and finished runner-up in four tournaments in 1993. More recently he has played on the Asian Senior Masters and Taiwan PGA Tour.

== Professional wins (14) ==
=== Asia Golf Circuit wins (3) ===
No.	Date	Tournament	Winning score	Margin of victory	Runner(s)-up
1	25 Feb 1968	Philippine Open	−10 (72-69-68-69=278)	8 strokes	(Japan) Shigeru Uchida
2	29 Feb 1976	Taiwan Open	E (67-69-80-72=288)	1 stroke	(Taiwan) Kuo Chie-Hsiung
3	27 Mar 1977	Singapore Open	−7 (67-71-69-70=277)	1 stroke	(Philippines) Ben Arda, (Myanmar) Mya Aye

Asia Golf Circuit playoff record (0–3)

No.	Year	Tournament	Opponent(s)	Result
1	1969	Taiwan Open	(Japan) Hideyo Sugimoto	Lost to par on first extra hole
2	1974	Indonesia Open	(Philippines) Ben Arda, (Australia) Graham Marsh	Arda won with par on sixth extra hole Hsu eliminated by par on first hole
3	1981	Indonesia Open	(Taiwan) Chen Tze-chung, (Thailand) Sukree Onsham, (United States) Payne Stewart	Stewart won with birdie on first extra hole

=== Other wins (8) ===
- 1975 Malaysian Dunlop Masters
- 1978 Bali Open, Philippine Masters
- 1980 Singapore PGA Championship
- 1981 Rolex Masters
- 1983 ROC PGA Championship
- 1987 Malaysian Royal Johor Classic
- 1988 ROC PGA Championship

=== Senior wins (3) ===
- 1988 Japan Ho-Oh Cup Senior Tournament
- 1989 Japan Ryobi Cup Senior Open, Japan Ho-Oh Cup Senior Open

== Results in major championships ==
Tournament	1976	1977
The Open Championship	T21	T58

Note: The Open Championship was the only major Hsu played.
"T" indicates a tie for a place

== Team appearances ==
- World Cup (representing Taiwan): 1969
