= 1978 Asia Golf Circuit =

Golf tour season

1978 Asia Golf Circuit season
- Duration: 16 February 1978 – 23 April 1978
- Number of official events: 10
- Most wins: (Taiwan) Hsieh Yung-yo (2) (Taiwan) Kuo Chie-Hsiung (2)
- Order of Merit: (Taiwan) Hsu Sheng-san

The 1978 Asia Golf Circuit was the 17th season of the Asia Golf Circuit (formerly the Far East Circuit), the main professional golf tour in Asia since it was established in 1961.

== Schedule ==
The following table lists official events during the 1978 season.

Date	Tournament	Host country	Purse (US$)	Winner (Note: The number in brackets after each winner's name is the number of Asia Golf Circuit events they had won up to and including that tournament. This information is only shown for Asia Golf Circuit members.)	Other tours (Note: JPN − PGA of Japan Tour.)	Notes
19 Feb	Philippine Open	Philippines	100,000	(Taiwan) Lu Liang-Huan (7)		
26 Feb	Hong Kong Open	Hong Kong	50,000	(Taiwan) Hsieh Yung-yo (12)		
5 Mar	Thailand Open	Thailand	30,000	(Taiwan) Hsu Sheng-san (4)		
12 Mar	Indian Open	India	30,000	(United States) Bill Brask (1)		
19 Mar	Malaysian Open	Malaysia	52,000	(Australia) Brian Jones (3)		
26 Mar	Singapore Open	Singapore	40,000	(Australia) Terry Gale (1)		
2 Apr	Indonesia Open	Indonesia	40,000	(Taiwan) Kuo Chie-Hsiung (6)		
9 Apr	Taiwan Open	Taiwan	35,000	(Taiwan) Hsieh Yung-yo (13)		
16 Apr	Korea Open	South Korea	30,000	(South Korea) Kim Seung-hack (3)		
23 Apr	Dunlop International Open	Japan	70,000	(Taiwan) Kuo Chie-Hsiung (7)	JPN	

=== Unofficial events ===
The following events were sanctioned by the Asia Golf Circuit, but did not carry official money, nor were wins official.

Date	Tournament	Host country	Purse ($)	Winner	Notes
12 Feb	Philippine Masters	Philippines	50,000	(Taiwan) Hsu Chi-san	Limited-field event

== Order of Merit ==
The Order of Merit was based on tournament results during the season, calculated using a points-based system.

Position	Player	Points
1	(Taiwan) Hsu Sheng-san	138
2	(Taiwan) Kuo Chie-Hsiung	133
3	(Australia) Stewart Ginn	85
4	(Taiwan) Ho Ming-chung	85
5	(Myanmar) Mya Aye	80
