= 1980 Asia Golf Circuit =

Golf tour season

1980 Asia Golf Circuit season
- Duration: 21 February 1980 – 27 April 1980
- Number of official events: 10
- Most wins: (Taiwan) Lu Hsi-chuen (3)
- Order of Merit: (Taiwan) Lu Hsi-chuen

The 1980 Asia Golf Circuit was the 19th season of the Asia Golf Circuit (formerly the Far East Circuit), the main professional golf tour in Asia since it was established in 1961.

== Schedule ==
The following table lists official events during the 1980 season.

Date	Tournament	Host country	Purse (US$)	Winner (Note: The number in brackets after each winner's name is the number of Asia Golf Circuit events they had won up to and including that tournament. This information is only shown for Asia Golf Circuit members.)	Other tours (Note: JPN − PGA of Japan Tour.)	Notes
24 Feb	Philippine Open	Philippines	100,000	(Taiwan) Lu Hsi-chuen (4)		
2 Mar	Cathay Pacific Hong Kong Open	Hong Kong	100,000	(Taiwan) Kuo Chie-Hsiung (8)		
9 Mar	Thailand Open	Thailand	50,000	(Taiwan) Lu Hsi-chuen (5)		
16 Mar	Indian Open	India	40,000	(United States) Kurt Cox (1)		
23 Mar	Malaysian Open	Malaysia	60,000	Mark McNulty (1)		
30 Mar	Singapore Open	Singapore	55,000	(United States) Kurt Cox (2)		
6 Apr	Indonesia Open	Indonesia	40,000	(Taiwan) Lu Hsi-chuen (6)		
13 Apr	Taiwan Open	Taiwan	60,000	(Taiwan) Kuo Chie-Hsiung (9)		
20 Apr	Korea Open	South Korea	60,000	(Taiwan) Chen Tze-ming (1)		
27 Apr	Dunlop International Open	Japan	110,000	(Japan) Masashi Ozaki (n/a)	JPN	

=== Unofficial events ===
The following events were sanctioned by the Asia Golf Circuit, but did not carry official money, nor were wins official.

Date	Tournament	Host country	Purse ($)	Winner	Notes
17 Feb	Philippine Masters	Philippines	80,000	(Taiwan) Hsieh Min-Nan	Limited-field event

== Order of Merit ==
The Order of Merit was based on tournament results during the season, calculated using a points-based system.

Position	Player	Points
1	(Taiwan) Lu Hsi-chuen	119
2	(United States) Kurt Cox	97
3	Mark McNulty	92
4	(Myanmar) Mya Aye	91
5	(Taiwan) Ho Ming-chung	74
