= Philippine Masters =

ICTSI Villamor Philippine Masters
Tournament information
- Location: Pasay, Philippines
- Established: 1976
- Course: Villamor Air Base Golf Club
- Par: 72
- Tours: Asia Golf Circuit; Philippine Golf Tour
- Format: Stroke play
- Prize fund: ₱2,000,000
- Month played: May

Tournament record score
- Aggregate: 277 Ben Arda (1976)
- To par: −11 as above

Current champion
- (Philippines) Angelo Que

Location map
- Location in the Philippines

The Philippine Masters is a professional golf tournament in the Philippines. First played as the Philippine Masters Invitational in 1976 over the golf course at Nichols Air Base (now Villamor Air Base) in Pasay, to the south of Manila, it was scheduled the week before the first event of the Asia Golf Circuit calendar, and as such was considered an unofficial season opener or warm-up event for the tour.

In the late 1990s, it became a full event on the Asia Golf Circuit but when the tour ended, the Philippine Masters soon followed. After 2000, it was not staged again until it was revived in 2017 as an event on the local Philippine Golf Tour.

== Winners ==
Year	Tour (Note: AGC − Asia Golf Circuit; PHI − Philippine Golf Tour.)	Winner	Score	To par	Margin of victory	Runner(s)-up	Ref.
ICTSI Villamor Philippine Masters
2024	PHI	(Philippines) Angelo Que	278	−10	4 strokes	(South Korea) Rho Hyun-ho	
2023	PHI	(Philippines) Jhonnel Ababa	285	−3	1 stroke	(Philippines) Joenard Rates (Netherlands) Guido van der Valk	
2019–2022: No tournament
2018	PHI	(Philippines) Jerson Balasabas	285	−3	Playoff (Note: Balasabas won with a par on the first hole of a sudden-death playoff.)	(Netherlands) Guido van der Valk	
2017	PHI	(Philippines) Clyde Mondilla	282	−6	1 stroke	(Philippines) Jhonnel Ababa (Philippines) Antonio Lascuña (United States) Nicolas Paez	
Philippine Masters
2001–2016: No tournament							
2000		(Philippines) Cassius Casas			Playoff	(Philippines) Robert Pactolerin	
1999: No tournament
Ericsson Philippine Masters
1998	AGC	(Philippines) Frankie Miñoza (2)	278	−10	Playoff (Note: Miñoza won with a birdie on the first hole of a sudden-death playoff.)	(Philippines) Rodrigo Cuello	
1996–97: No tournament							
San Miguel Beer Philippine Masters
1995	AGC (Note: Between 1976 and 1995, the event was sanctioned by the Asia Golf Circuit, however it was an unofficial money event; therefore the win is considered unofficial on that tour.)	(Sweden) Olle Nordberg	281	−7			
1994	AGC	(Philippines) Rodrigo Cuello	279	−9	Playoff (Note: Cuello won with a birdie on the first hole of a sudden-death playoff.)	(Philippines) Frankie Miñoza (Philippines) Robert Pactolerin	
San Miguel/Coca-Cola Philippine Masters
1993	AGC	(Philippines) Frankie Miñoza	279	−9	6 strokes	(Philippines) Ernie Rellon (Philippines) Danny Zarate	
Calsberg Philippine Masters
1992		(Philippines) Robert Pactolerin (2)					
1991	AGC	(Philippines) Robert Pactolerin					
1990	AGC	(United States) E. J. Pfister	285	−3	5 strokes	(United States) Don Klenk	
1989	AGC	(Philippines) George Olaybar					
Philippine Masters
1981–1988: No tournament
1980	AGC	(Taiwan) Hsieh Min-Nan	283	−5	2 strokes	(Taiwan) Lu Hsi-chuen (United States) Rick Mallicoat	
1979	AGC	(Myanmar) Mya Aye	280	−8	2 strokes	(Taiwan) Ho Ming-chung	
1978	AGC	(Taiwan) Hsu Chi-san	284	−4	1 stroke	(Philippines) Rudy Lavares (United States) Tom Purtzer (Philippines) Mario Siodini	
1977	AGC	(Philippines) Ben Arda (2)	279	−9	2 strokes	(United States) Gaylord Burrows	
1976	AGC	(Philippines) Ben Arda	277	−11	6 strokes	(South Korea) Kim Seung-hack	
