= Brian Tennyson =

American professional golfer (born 1962)

Personal information
- Nationality: United States
- Born: July 10, 1962 (age 64) Evansville, Indiana, U.S.
- Height: 5 ft 10 in (1.78 m)
- Weight: 165 lb (75 kg; 11.8 st)
- Spouse: Jeanne

Career
- Sport: Golf
- College: Ball State University
- Turned professional: 1984; Reinstated as amateur in 2008
- Former tours: PGA Tour; Nike Tour; Asia Golf Circuit
- Professional wins: 3
- Highest ranking: 95 (September 23, 1990)

Best results in major championships
- Masters Tournament: T53: 1991
- PGA Championship: T26: 1990
- U.S. Open: CUT: 1987, 1988, 1989, 1991, 1997
- The Open Championship: DNP

Achievements and awards
- Ball State University Hall of Fame: 1994

Brian Tennyson (born July 10, 1962) is an American former professional golfer.

== Early life and amateur career ==
Tennyson was born in Evansville, Indiana. He played college golf at Ball State University. He was twice named as an NCAA All-American in 1982 and 1983; in 1984, the Golf Coaches Association named him an All-American. He was a three-time All-MAC golfer (1982–84) and the team MVP in 1982 and 1984. He led the Cardinals to the 1982 Conference title, he tied for first but lost in the playoff.

== Professional career ==
In 1984, Tennyson turned professional. He played on the Asia Golf Circuit, winning twice in 1987. He played on the PGA Tour from 1988 to 1992. His best finishes were T-2 at the 1989 Hardee's Golf Classic and the 1990 Bob Hope Chrysler Classic.

When his golf game diminished in 1991 and 1992, Tennyson left golf and accepted a job in October 1992 as vice president of strategic planning at Papa John's Pizza – he had been roommates with Papa John's founder, John Schnatter at Ball State. He helped take the company public in June 1993. Unhappy with a corporate job, Tennyson quit in April 1994 and decided to resume his golf career. He returned to the PGA Tour in 1996 where he had one top-10 finish, T-9 at the Quad City Classic. He played on the Buy.com Tour (now Web.com Tour) from 1998 to 2000 where his best finish was second at the 1999 Nike Dayton Open.

After retiring from golf in 2001, Tennyson worked as a studio analyst at Golf Channel and Fox Sports. He also started his own business.

== Reinstated amateur status ==
Tennyson regained his amateur status in 2008.

== Awards and honors ==
- In 1982 and 1983, Tennyson was an NCAA All-American
- In 1994, Tennyson inducted into the Ball State University Hall of Fame

== Amateur wins ==
this list may be incomplete

- 8 intercollegiate events from 1980 to 1984

== Professional wins (3) ==
=== Asia Golf Circuit wins (2) ===
No.	Date	Tournament	Winning score	Margin of victory	Runner(s)-up
1	22 Feb 1987	San Miguel Philippine Open	E (73-71-73-71=288)	1 stroke	(Taiwan) Chen Tze-ming
2	22 Mar 1987	Charminar Challenge Indian Open	−8 (74-73-65-68=280)	3 strokes	(United States) Mike Cunning, (United States) Jim Hallet

=== Other wins (1) ===
this list may be incomplete

- 1990 Palm Beach Golf Classic (with Ken Green)

== Results in major championships ==
Tournament	1987	1988	1989	1990	1991	1992	1993	1994	1995	1996	1997
Masters Tournament					T53						
U.S. Open	CUT	CUT	CUT		CUT						CUT
PGA Championship			T27	T26	CUT						

Note: Tennyson never played in The Open Championship

Did not play

CUT = missed the half-way cut
"T" = tied

== See also ==
- 1987 PGA Tour Qualifying School graduates
- 1995 PGA Tour Qualifying School graduates
