= Hsieh Chin-sheng =

Taiwanese professional golfer (born 1963)

Personal information
- Nationality: Taiwan
- Born: 5 February 1963 (age 63)

Career
- Sport: Golf
- Turned professional: 1986
- Former tours: Japan Golf Tour; Asia Golf Circuit; Asian Tour
- Professional wins: 12

Number of wins by tour
- Asian Tour: 2 (Asia Golf Circuit)
- Other: 10

Best results in major championships
- Masters Tournament: DNP
- PGA Championship: DNP
- U.S. Open: DNP
- The Open Championship: 1988: T67

Hsieh Chin-sheng (Chinese: 謝錦昇, born 5 February 1963) is a Taiwanese professional golfer. He won twice on the 1988 Asia Golf Circuit, the Hong Kong Open and the Philippine Open.

== Amateur career ==
Hsieh played for the Republic of China in the 1985 Nomura Cup in Australia, where the team finished second, and in the 1986 Eisenhower Trophy in Venezuela, where they finished third. He had the fourth best individual score in the Eisenhower Trophy event.

== Professional career ==
Hsieh turned professional in 1986 after the Eisenhower Trophy. He played on the Asia Golf Circuit in 1987 but his best result was in the NST Niigata Open on the Japan Golf Tour where he was a joint runner-up behind Tadao Nakamura.

Hsieh won the first two events of the 1988 Asia Golf Circuit season, the Hong Kong Open and the Philippine Open. He won the Hong Kong Open by a stroke from Lu Chien-soon. The following week he won the Philippine Open, five ahead of Steve Bowman. Two weeks later he was joint runner-up in the Malaysian Open, a stroke behind Tray Tyner. He finished the season in second place in the Asian Golf Circuit Order of Merit.

Hsieh continued to play on the Asian Golf Circuit until the end of 1993. He didn't win again on the tour but was runner-up a number of times. In both 1990 and 1991 he was a runner-up in the Maekyung Open in Korea. In 1992 he was runner-up in the Philippine Open and in the Malaysian Open, behind Vijay Singh, while in 1993 he lost in a playoff for the Thailand Open. He was also runner-up to Daniel Chopra in the 1995 Republic of China Open.

From 1994 to 2003 Hsieh played mostly on the Japan Golf Tour. This best season on the tour was his first, 1994, when he finished 19th in the money list. He was runner-up that season in the Dunlop Open, an event that was also on the Asia Golf Circuit, and in the Tokai Classic behind Corey Pavin. Earlier in 1994 Hsieh had also performed well in the Johnnie Walker Classic, a European Tour event played in Thailand. He had finished tied for 6th place despite a final round 74. In 1998 Hsieh was runner-up in the Omega PGA Championship, an Asian Tour event. From 2004 Hsieh played in a limited number of Asian events but with little success.

== Personal life ==
His older brother, Hsieh Yu-shu, is also a professional golfer.

== Professional wins (12) ==
=== Asia Golf Circuit wins (2) ===
| No. | Date | Tournament | Winning score | Margin of victory | Runner-up |
|---|---|---|---|---|---|
| 1 | 14 Feb 1988 | Unisys Hong Kong Open | −10 (70-71-66-67=274) | 1 stroke | (Taiwan) Lu Chien-soon |
| 2 | 21 Feb 1988 | Coca-Cola Philippine Open | −5 (68-69-74-72=283) | 5 strokes | (United States) Steve Bowman |

Asia Golf Circuit playoff record (0–2)

| No. | Year | Tournament | Opponent(s) | Result |
|---|---|---|---|---|
| 1 | 1992 | Philippine Open | (Taiwan) Wang Ter-chang | Lost to par on first extra hole |
| 2 | 1993 | Thai International Thailand Open | (United States) Steve Flesch, (Australia) Craig Mann | Mann won with birdie on second extra hole Flesch eliminated by par on first hole |

=== Taiwan wins (10) ===
- 1988 Taichung Open
- 1989 Tamsui Open
- 1990 Lin Kuo Open
- 1991 Shin Fong Open, Tamsui Open
- 1992 ROC PGA Championship & Sunrise Open, Chang Hwa Open, Sun Home Open
- 1993 ROC PGA Championship & Pearl Height Open
- 1995 Mercuries Taiwan Masters

== Results in major championships ==
| Tournament | 1988 |
|---|---|
| The Open Championship | T67 |

== Team appearances ==
Amateur

- Nomura Cup (representing Republic of China): 1985
- Eisenhower Trophy (representing Republic of China): 1986

Professional

- Dunhill Cup (representing Taiwan): 1989
