= Greg Bruckner =

American professional golfer (born 1959)

Personal information
- Nationality: United States
- Born: September 22, 1959 (age 67) Manhattan Beach, California, U.S.
- Height: 6 ft 0 in (1.83 m)
- Weight: 195 lb (88 kg; 13.9 st)

Career
- Sport: Golf
- College: Arizona State University
- Turned professional: 1986
- Former tours: PGA Tour; Nationwide Tour; Gateway Tour; Champions Tour
- Professional wins: 7

Number of wins by tour
- Korn Ferry Tour: 1
- Other: 6

Best results in major championships
- Masters Tournament: DNP
- PGA Championship: DNP
- U.S. Open: T56: 1995
- The Open Championship: T67: 1988

Greg Bruckner (born September 22, 1959) is an American professional golfer.

== Early life and amateur career ==
Bruckner was born in Manhattan Beach, California. He played college golf at Arizona State University.

== Professional career ==
In 1986, Bruckner turned professional. He played on the Asia Golf Circuit, winning the 1988 Singapore Open, before earning his PGA Tour card at 1989 PGA Tour Qualifying School.

Bruckner played on the PGA Tour from 1990 to 1992 where his best finishes were a pair of T-14, at the 1990 H.E.B. Texas Open and the 1991 Northern Telecom Open. He played on the Nationwide Tour from 1992 to 1999 and again in 2004, winning once at the 1992 Ben Hogan New England Classic. He also played on the Gateway Tour from 2008 to 2010, winning once in 2009.

== Amateur wins ==
- 1985 Pacific Coast Amateur

== Professional wins (7) ==
=== Asia Golf Circuit wins (1) ===
| No. | Date | Tournament | Winning score | Margin of victory | Runner-up |
|---|---|---|---|---|---|
| 1 | Mar 13, 1988 | Singapore Open | −7 (72-69-67-73=281) | 1 stroke | (Taiwan) Chung Chun-hsing |

=== Ben Hogan Tour wins (1) ===
| No. | Date | Tournament | Winning score | Margin of victory | Runner-up |
|---|---|---|---|---|---|
| 1 | Jun 28, 1992 | Ben Hogan New England Classic | −8 (73-68-67=208) | Playoff | (United States) Ed Kirby |

Ben Hogan Tour playoff record (1–0)

| No. | Year | Tournament | Opponent | Result |
|---|---|---|---|---|
| 1 | 1992 | Ben Hogan New England Classic | (United States) Ed Kirby | Won with par on first extra hole |

=== Gateway Tour wins (2) ===
| No. | Date | Tournament | Winning score | Margin of victory | Runner-up |
|---|---|---|---|---|---|
| 1 | Sep 10, 2003 | Drive Headwear Classic | −10 (65-69-69=203) | 3 strokes | (United States) Rob Rashell |
| 2 | Feb 19, 2009 | Desert Winter 6 | −12 (69-69-66=204) | 1 stroke | (United States) Luke List |

=== Other wins (3) ===
- 1988 Rolex Masters
- 2003 Arizona Open
- 2015 Long Beach Open

== See also ==
- 1989 PGA Tour Qualifying School graduates
- 1990 PGA Tour Qualifying School graduates
