= 1977 Asia Golf Circuit =

Golf tour season

1977 Asia Golf Circuit season
- Duration: 17 February 1977 – 24 April 1977
- Number of official events: 10
- Most wins: (Taiwan) Hsieh Min-Nan (2)
- Order of Merit: (Taiwan) Hsieh Min-Nan

The 1977 Asia Golf Circuit was the 16th season of the Asia Golf Circuit (formerly the Far East Circuit), the main professional golf tour in Asia since it was established in 1961.

== Schedule ==
The following table lists official events during the 1977 season.

Date	Tournament	Host country	Purse (US$)	Winner (Note: The number in brackets after each winner's name is the number of Asia Golf Circuit events they had won up to and including that tournament. This information is only shown for Asia Golf Circuit members.)	Other tours (Note: JPN − PGA of Japan Tour.)	Notes
20 Feb	Philippine Open	Philippines	70,000	(Taiwan) Hsieh Yung-yo (11)		
27 Feb	Hong Kong Open	Hong Kong	50,000	(Taiwan) Hsieh Min-Nan (3)		
6 Mar	Thailand Open	Thailand	30,000	(Japan) Yurio Akitomi (1)		
13 Mar	Malaysian Open	Malaysia	40,000	(Australia) Stewart Ginn (1)		
20 Mar	Indonesia Open	Indonesia	40,000	(United States) Gaylord Burrows (1)		
27 Mar	Singapore Open	Singapore	45,000	(Taiwan) Hsu Chi-san (3)		
3 Apr	Indian Open	India	30,000	(Australia) Brian Jones (2)		
10 Apr	Taiwan Open	Taiwan	30,000	(Taiwan) Hsieh Min-Nan (4)		
17 Apr	Korea Open	South Korea	30,000	(Taiwan) Ho Ming-chung (2)		
24 Apr	Dunlop International Open	Japan	80,000	(Philippines) Ben Arda (8)	JPN	

=== Unofficial events ===
The following events were sanctioned by the Asia Golf Circuit, but did not carry official money, nor were wins official.

Date	Tournament	Host country	Purse ($)	Winner	Notes
13 Feb	Philippine Masters	Philippines	20,000	(Philippines) Ben Arda	Limited-field event

== Order of Merit ==
The Order of Merit was based on tournament results during the season, calculated using a points-based system.

Position	Player	Points
1	(Taiwan) Hsieh Min-Nan	140
2	(Myanmar) Mya Aye	109
3	(Taiwan) Hsu Chi-san	97
4	(Taiwan) Kuo Chie-Hsiung	94
5	(Philippines) Ben Arda	92
