= 1992 Asia Golf Circuit =

Golf tour season

1992 Asia Golf Circuit season
- Duration: 20 February 1992 – 26 April 1992
- Number of official events: 9 (Note: One further tournament was scheduled but was cancelled.)
- Order of Merit: (United States) Todd Hamilton

The 1992 Asia Golf Circuit was the 31st season of the Asia Golf Circuit (formerly the Far East Circuit), the main professional golf tour in Asia since it was established in 1961.

== Schedule ==
The following table lists official events during the 1992 season.

Date	Tournament	Host country	Purse (US$)	Winner (Note: The number in brackets after each winner's name is the number of Asia Golf Circuit events they had won up to and including that tournament. This information is only shown for Asia Golf Circuit members.)	OWGR points	Other tours (Note: JPN − PGA of Japan Tour.)	Notes
23 Feb	Philippine Open	Philippines	150,000	(Taiwan) Wang Ter-chang (1)	12		
1 Mar	Epson Singapore Open	Singapore	400,000	(United States) Bill Israelson (2)	14		
8 Mar	Hutchison Telecom Hong Kong Open	Hong Kong	250,000	(United States) Tom Watson (n/a)	26		
15 Mar	Benson & Hedges Malaysian Open	Malaysia	200,000	(Fiji) Vijay Singh (1)	14		
~~22 Mar~~	Indonesia Open	Indonesia	–	Cancelled	–		
29 Mar	Wills Indian Open	India	150,000	(Australia) Stewart Ginn (3)	12		
5 Apr	Thai International Thailand Open	Thailand	200,000	(Thailand) Boonchu Ruangkit (1)	12		
12 Apr	Sanyang Republic of China Open	Taiwan	300,000	(Taiwan) Lin Chie-hsiang (1)	12		
19 Apr	Maekyung Open	South Korea	300,000	(United States) Todd Hamilton (1)	12		
26 Apr	Dunlop Open	Japan	¥100,000,000	(Japan) Masashi Ozaki (n/a)	28	JPN	

=== Unofficial events ===
The following events were sanctioned by the Asia Golf Circuit, but did not carry official money, nor were wins official.

Date	Tournament	Host country	Purse ($)	Winner	Notes
22 Mar	Rolex Masters	Singapore	S$150,000	(United States) Todd Hamilton	

== Order of Merit ==
The Order of Merit was based on tournament results during the season, calculated using a points-based system. The leading player on the Order of Merit earned status to play on the 1992 PGA of Japan Tour.

Position	Player	Points
1	(United States) Todd Hamilton	875
2	(Taiwan) Hsieh Chin-sheng	600
3	(United States) Tom Pernice Jr.	591
4	(United States) Bill Israelson	577
5	(United States) Craig McClellan	556
