= 1990 Asia Golf Circuit =

Golf tour season

1990 Asia Golf Circuit season
- Duration: 15 February 1990 – 22 April 1990
- Number of official events: 10
- Most wins: (Philippines) Frankie Miñoza (3)
- Order of Merit: (Philippines) Frankie Miñoza

The 1990 Asia Golf Circuit was the 29th season of the Asia Golf Circuit (formerly the Far East Circuit), the main professional golf tour in Asia since it was established in 1961.

== Schedule ==
The following table lists official events during the 1990 season.

Date	Tournament	Host country	Purse (US$)	Winner (Note: The number in brackets after each winner's name is the number of Asia Golf Circuit events they had won up to and including that tournament. This information is only shown for Asia Golf Circuit members.)	OWGR points	Other tours (Note: JPN − PGA of Japan Tour.)	Notes
18 Feb	San Miguel/Coca-Cola Philippine Open	Philippines	140,000	(Philippines) Robert Pactolerin (1)	8		
25 Feb	Martell Hong Kong Open	Hong Kong	200,000	(United States) Ken Green (n/a)	8		
4 Mar	Thai International Thailand Open	Thailand	150,000	(Taiwan) Lu Wen-teh (1)	8		
11 Mar	Wills Indian Open	India	120,000	(United States) Andrew Debusk (1)	8		
18 Mar	Epson Singapore Open	Singapore	300,000	(Philippines) Antolin Fernando (1)	8		
24 Mar	Indonesia Open	Indonesia	120,000	(Philippines) Frankie Miñoza (4)	8		
1 Apr	Benson & Hedges Malaysian Open	Malaysia	200,000	(United States) Glen Day (1)	8		
8 Apr	Sanyang Republic of China Open	Taiwan	200,000	(Philippines) Frankie Miñoza (5)	8		
15 Apr	Maekyung Open	South Korea	300,000	(South Korea) Lee Kang-sun (1)	6		
22 Apr	Dunlop Open	Japan	¥100,000,000	(Philippines) Frankie Miñoza (6)	14	JPN	

=== Unofficial events ===
The following events were sanctioned by the Asia Golf Circuit, but did not carry official money, nor were wins official.

Date	Tournament	Host country	Purse ($)	Winner	Notes
11 Feb	Carlsberg Philippine Masters	Philippines	₱2,000,000	(United States) E. J. Pfister	

== Order of Merit ==
The Order of Merit was based on tournament results during the season, calculated using a points-based system. The leading player on the Order of Merit earned status to play on the 1990 PGA of Japan Tour.

Position	Player	Points
1	(Philippines) Frankie Miñoza	1,006
2	(Canada) Danny Mijovic	696
3	(Canada) Rick Gibson	596
4	(Taiwan) Chen Liang-hsi	572
5	(United States) Glen Day	536
