= 1996–97 Asia Golf Circuit =

Golf tour season

1996–97 Asia Golf Circuit season
- Duration: 17 October 1996 – 27 April 1997
- Number of official events: 10 (Note: One further tournament was scheduled but was removed from the schedule.)
- Order of Merit: (South Korea) Kim Jong-duck
- Rookie of the Year: (United States) Dean Wilson

The 1996–97 Asia Golf Circuit was the 36th season of the Asia Golf Circuit (formerly the Far East Circuit), one of the main professional golf tours in Asia (outside of Japan) alongside the Asian PGA Tour.

== Schedule ==
The following table lists official events during the 1996–97 season.

Date	Tournament	Host country	Purse (US$)	Winner (Note: The number in brackets after each winner's name is the number of Asia Golf Circuit events they had won up to and including that tournament. This information is only shown for Asia Golf Circuit members.)	OWGR points	Other tours (Note: JPN − PGA of Japan Tour.)	Notes
20 Oct	Chinfon Republic of China Open	Taiwan	300,000	(Taiwan) Hong Chia-yuh (a) (2)	12		
~~1 Dec~~	Tugu Pratama Indonesian PGA Championship	Indonesia	–	Removed (Note: Proceeded as an Asian PGA Tour event.)	–		
8 Dec	Andersen Consulting Hong Kong Open	Hong Kong	350,000	(Philippines) Rodrigo Cuello (1)	14		
16 Feb	Mitsubishi Motors Southwoods Open	Philippines	250,000	(Japan) Takao Nogami (1)	12		
23 Feb	Konica U-Bix Manila Open	Philippines	200,000	(Japan) Yasuharu Imano (1)	12		New tournament
9 Mar	Benson & Hedges Malaysian Open	Malaysia	300,000	(England) Lee Westwood (n/a)	14		
16 Mar	Thai Airways Thailand Open	Thailand	300,000	(United States) Christian Chernock (1)	12		
23 Mar	Rolex Masters	Singapore	300,000	(Myanmar) Kyi Hla Han (1)	12		
30 Mar	Classic Indian Open	India	300,000	(England) Ed Fryatt (2)	12		
20 Apr	Philippine Open	Philippines	300,000	(United States) Kevin Wentworth (1)	12		
27 Apr	Kirin Open	Japan	¥100,000,000	(South Korea) Kim Jong-duck (2)	22	JPN	

== Order of Merit ==
The Order of Merit was based on prize money won during the season, calculated in U.S. dollars. The leading player on the Order of Merit earned status to play on the 1997 PGA of Japan Tour.

Position	Player	Prize money ($)
1	(South Korea) Kim Jong-duck	156,231
2	(England) Ed Fryatt	119,420
3	(United States) Kevin Wentworth	107,523
4	(United States) Larry Barber	96,072
5	(United States) Gary Rusnak	75,653

== Awards ==
Award	Winner	Ref.
Rookie of the Year (Tun Abdul Hamid Omar Award)	(United States) Dean Wilson	

== See also ==
- 1996 Asian PGA Tour
- 1997 Asian PGA Tour
