= 1971 Asia Golf Circuit =

Golf tour season

1971 Asia Golf Circuit season
- Duration: 25 February 1971 – 25 April 1971
- Number of official events: 9
- Most wins: (Japan) Haruo Yasuda (2)
- Order of Merit: (Taiwan) Hsieh Min-Nan

The 1971 Asia Golf Circuit was the 10th season of the Asia Golf Circuit (formerly the Far East Circuit), the main professional golf tour in Asia since it was established in 1961.

== Schedule ==
The following table lists official events during the 1971 season.

Date	Tournament	Host country	Purse (US$)	Winner (Note: The number in brackets after each winner's name is the number of Asia Golf Circuit events they had won up to and including that tournament. This information is only shown for Asia Golf Circuit members.)	Notes
28 Feb	Philippine Open	Philippines	15,000	(Taiwan) Chen Chien-chung (2)	
7 Mar	Singapore Open	Singapore	15,000	(Japan) Haruo Yasuda (2)	
14 Mar	Malaysian Open	Malaysia	25,000	(Japan) Takaaki Kono (2)	
21 Mar	Indian Open	India	15,000	(Australia) Graham Marsh (1)	
28 Mar	Thailand Open	Thailand	15,000	(Taiwan) Lu Liang-Huan (3)	
4 Apr	Hong Kong Open	Hong Kong	18,000	(United States) Orville Moody (n/a)	
11 Apr	Taiwan Open	Taiwan	15,000	(Taiwan) Chang Chung-fa (2)	
18 Apr	Korea Open	South Korea	15,000	(South Korea) Han Chang-sang (2)	
25 Apr	Yomiuri International	Japan	20,000	(Japan) Haruo Yasuda (3)	

== Order of Merit ==
The Order of Merit was based on tournament results during the season, calculated using a points-based system.

Position	Player	Points
1	(Taiwan) Hsieh Min-Nan	107
2	(Taiwan) Lu Liang-Huan	
3	(Australia) Graham Marsh	88
4	(Japan) Haruo Yasuda	87
5	(Taiwan) Chen Chien-chung	
