= 1995 Asia Golf Circuit =

Golf tour season

1995 Asia Golf Circuit season
- Duration: 2 February 1995 – 30 April 1995
- Number of official events: 12
- Most wins: (United States) Brandt Jobe (3)
- Order of Merit: (United States) Brandt Jobe
- Rookie of the Year: (Sweden) Daniel Chopra

The 1995 Asia Golf Circuit was the 34th season of the Asia Golf Circuit (formerly the Far East Circuit), one of the main professional golf tours in Asia (outside of Japan) alongside the newly formed Asian PGA Tour.

== Schedule ==
The following table lists official events during the 1995 season.

Date	Tournament	Host country	Purse (US$)	Winner (Note: The number in brackets after each winner's name is the number of Asia Golf Circuit events they had won up to and including that tournament. This information is only shown for Asia Golf Circuit members.)	OWGR points	Other tours (Note: JPN − PGA of Japan Tour.)	Notes
5 Feb	Thai Airways Thailand Open	Thailand	300,000	(United States) Todd Hamilton (2)	14		
12 Feb	Sabah Masters	Malaysia	250,000	(United States) Brandt Jobe (2)	12		
26 Feb	Dole Casino Filipino Philippine Open	Philippines	300,000	(Mexico) Carlos Espinosa (2)	12		
5 Mar	Classic Indian Open	India	250,000	(Canada) Jim Rutledge (1)	12		
12 Mar	Benson & Hedges Malaysian Open	Malaysia	250,000	(United States) Clay Devers (1)	18		
18 Mar	Sampoerna Indonesia Open	Indonesia	250,000	(Argentina) José Cantero (1)	16		
26 Mar	Sempati Bali Open	Indonesia	250,000	(United States) Brandt Jobe (3)	12		New tournament
2 Apr	Rolex Masters	Singapore	250,000	(United States) Ron Wuensche (1)	12		Upgraded to official event
9 Apr	Chinfon Republic of China Open	Taiwan	300,000	(Sweden) Daniel Chopra (1)	12		
16 Apr	Maekyung Bando Fashion Open	South Korea	400,000	(United States) Brandt Jobe (4)	12		
23 Apr	Dunlop Open	Japan	¥90,000,000	(Australia) Peter Senior (n/a)	20	JPN	
30 Apr	Volvo China Open	China	450,000	(Paraguay) Raúl Fretes (1)	12		

=== Unofficial events ===
The following events were sanctioned by the Asia Golf Circuit, but did not carry official money, nor were wins official.

Date	Tournament	Host country	Purse ($)	Winner	Notes
19 Feb	San Miguel Beer Philippine Masters	Philippines	250,000	(Sweden) Olle Nordberg	

== Order of Merit ==
The Order of Merit was based on prize money won during the season, calculated in U.S. dollars. The leading player on the Order of Merit earned status to play on the 1995 PGA of Japan Tour.

Position	Player	Prize money ($)
1	(United States) Brandt Jobe	178,524
2	(Sweden) Daniel Chopra	121,142
3	(Canada) Jim Rutledge	98,778
4	(Paraguay) Raúl Fretes	95,696
5	(United States) Bob May	94,593

== Awards ==
Award	Winner	Ref.
Rookie of the Year (Tun Abdul Hamid Omar Award)	(Sweden) Daniel Chopra	

== See also ==
- 1995 Asian PGA Tour
