= 1981 Asia Golf Circuit =

Golf tour season

1981 Asia Golf Circuit season
- Duration: 19 February 1981 – 26 April 1981
- Number of official events: 10
- Most wins: (Taiwan) Chen Tze-ming (2) (United States) Tom Sieckmann (2) (United States) Payne Stewart (2)
- Order of Merit: (Taiwan) Lu Hsi-chuen

The 1981 Asia Golf Circuit was the 20th season of the Asia Golf Circuit (formerly the Far East Circuit), the main professional golf tour in Asia since it was established in 1961.

== Changes for 1981 ==
In 1978, Papua New Guinea had joined the Asian Golf Confederation with the intention of adding a tournament to the circuit in 1980. These plans were postponed and the tournament was then provisionally scheduled to start the 1981 season, but Papua New Guinea withdrew from the circuit later in the year.

After several years of the Indian Open clashing with the Malaysian Dunlop Masters, the Malaysian Golf Association managed to get the organisers, Dunlop Malaysia, to agree to reschedule their event. However, the organisers of the Rolex Masters in Singapore controversially then organised their tournament for the same dates.

== Schedule ==
The following table lists official events during the 1981 season.

Date	Tournament	Host country	Purse (US$)	Winner (Note: The number in brackets after each winner's name is the number of Asia Golf Circuit events they had won up to and including that tournament. This information is only shown for Asia Golf Circuit members.)	Other tours (Note: JPN − PGA of Japan Tour.)	Notes
22 Feb	Philippine Open	Philippines	150,000	(United States) Tom Sieckmann (1)		
1 Mar	Cathay Pacific Hong Kong Open	Hong Kong	120,000	(Taiwan) Chen Tze-ming (2)		
8 Mar	Thailand Open	Thailand	60,000	(United States) Tom Sieckmann (2)		
15 Mar	Indian Open	India	60,000	(United States) Payne Stewart (1)		
22 Mar	Malaysian Open	Malaysia	70,000	(Taiwan) Lu Hsi-chuen (7)		
29 Mar	Singapore Open	Singapore	70,000	(Myanmar) Mya Aye (2)		
5 Apr	Indonesia Open	Indonesia	60,000	(United States) Payne Stewart (2)		
12 Apr	Taiwan Open	Taiwan	100,000	(Taiwan) Ho Ming-chung (3)		
19 Apr	Korea Open	South Korea	70,000	(Taiwan) Chen Tze-ming (3)		
26 Apr	Dunlop International Open	Japan	¥30,000,000	(Japan) Kosaku Shimada (1)	JPN	

== Order of Merit ==
The Order of Merit was based on tournament results during the season, calculated using a points-based system.

Position	Player	Points
1	(Taiwan) Lu Hsi-chuen	713
2	(Taiwan) Ho Ming-chung	697
3	(United States) Payne Stewart	690
4	(United States) Tom Sieckmann	675
5	(Taiwan) Chen Tze-ming	627
