= 1994 Asia Golf Circuit =

Golf tour season

1994 Asia Golf Circuit season
- Duration: 17 February 1994 – 24 April 1994
- Number of official events: 10
- Order of Merit: (Paraguay) Carlos Franco

The 1994 Asia Golf Circuit, titled as the 1994 Newsweek Asian Tour for sponsorship reasons, was the 33rd season of the Asia Golf Circuit (formerly the Far East Circuit), the main professional golf tour in Asia since it was established in 1961.

== Newsweek title sponsorship ==
In December 1993, it was announced that the tour had signed a title sponsorship agreement with Newsweek, being renamed as the Newsweek Asian Tour.

== Schedule ==
The following table lists official events during the 1994 season.

Date	Tournament	Host country	Purse (US$)	Winner (Note: The number in brackets after each winner's name is the number of Asia Golf Circuit events they had won up to and including that tournament. This information is only shown for Asia Golf Circuit members.)	OWGR points	Other tours (Note: JPN − PGA of Japan Tour.)	Notes
20 Feb	Manila Southwoods Philippine Open	Philippines	250,000	(Paraguay) Carlos Franco (1)	18		
27 Feb	Kent Hong Kong Open	Hong Kong	250,000	(South Africa) David Frost (n/a)	30		
6 Mar	Classic Indian Open	India	200,000	(United States) Emlyn Aubrey (2)	12		
13 Mar	Thailand Open	Thailand	300,000	(United States) Brandt Jobe (1)	12		
20 Mar	Benson & Hedges Malaysian Open	Malaysia	250,000	(Sweden) Joakim Haeggman (n/a)	16		
26 Mar	Sampoerna Indonesia Open	Indonesia	250,000	(New Zealand) Frank Nobilo (n/a)	16		
4 Apr	Sabah Masters	Malaysia	260,000	(United States) Craig McClellan (1)	12		New to Asia Golf Circuit
10 Apr	Chinfon Republic of China Open	Taiwan	300,000	(Taiwan) Hong Chia-yuh (a) (1)	12		
17 Apr	Maekyung Open	South Korea	350,000	(South Korea) Kim Jong-duck (1)	12		
24 Apr	Dunlop Open	Japan	¥100,000,000	(Japan) Masashi Ozaki (n/a)	20	JPN	

=== Unofficial events ===
The following events were sanctioned by the Asia Golf Circuit, but did not carry official money, nor were wins official.

Date	Tournament	Host country	Purse ($)	Winner	Notes
30 Jan	San Miguel Beer Philippine Masters	Philippines	₱2,500,000	(Philippines) Rodrigo Cuello	
6 Mar	Rolex Masters	Singapore	S$200,000	(Malaysia) Marimuthu Ramayah	

== Order of Merit ==
The Order of Merit was based on tournament results during the season, calculated using a points-based system. The leading player on the Order of Merit earned status to play on the 1994 PGA of Japan Tour.

Position	Player	Points
1	(Paraguay) Carlos Franco	827
2	(United States) Brandt Jobe	708
3	(Canada) Jim Rutledge	686
4	(United States) Lee Porter	683
5	(United States) Emlyn Aubrey	663
