= 1975 Asia Golf Circuit =

Golf tour season

1975 Asia Golf Circuit season
- Duration: 13 February 1975 – 20 April 1975
- Number of official events: 10
- Most wins: (Taiwan) Kuo Chie-Hsiung (3)
- Order of Merit: (Taiwan) Hsieh Min-Nan

The 1975 Asia Golf Circuit was the 14th season of the Asia Golf Circuit (formerly the Far East Circuit), the main professional golf tour in Asia since it was established in 1961.

== Schedule ==
The following table lists official events during the 1975 season.

Date	Tournament	Host country	Purse (US$)	Winner (Note: The number in brackets after each winner's name is the number of Asia Golf Circuit events they had won up to and including that tournament. This information is only shown for Asia Golf Circuit members.)	Other tours (Note: JPN − PGA of Japan Tour.)	Notes
16 Feb	Philippine Open	Philippines	40,000	(Taiwan) Kuo Chie-Hsiung (3)		
23 Feb	Hong Kong Open	Hong Kong	40,000	(Taiwan) Hsieh Yung-yo (10)		
2 Mar	Thailand Open	Thailand	30,000	(United States) Howard Twitty (n/a)		
9 Mar	Malaysian Open	Malaysia	40,000	(Australia) Graham Marsh (5)		
16 Mar	Indonesia Open	Indonesia	25,000	(Taiwan) Hsu Sheng-san (2)		
23 Mar	Singapore Open	Singapore	35,000	(Japan) Yutaka Suzuki (1)		
30 Mar	Indian Open	India	25,000	(Australia) Ted Ball (2)		
6 Apr	Taiwan Open	Taiwan	30,000	(Taiwan) Kuo Chie-Hsiung (4)		
13 Apr	Korea Open	South Korea	25,000	(Taiwan) Kuo Chie-Hsiung (5)		
20 Apr	Sobu International Open	Japan	50,000	(Japan) Teruo Sugihara (2)	JPN	

== Order of Merit ==
The Order of Merit was based on tournament results during the season, calculated using a points-based system.

Position	Player	Points
1	(Taiwan) Hsieh Min-Nan	140
2	(Taiwan) Kuo Chie-Hsiung	139.5
3	(Australia) Ted Ball	117
4	(Philippines) Ben Arda	110
5	(Australia) Stewart Ginn	102
