= 1989 Asia Golf Circuit =

Golf tour season

1989 Asia Golf Circuit season
- Duration: 9 February 1989 – 23 April 1989
- Number of official events: 11
- Most wins: (United States) Brian Claar (2) (Taiwan) Lu Chien-soon (2)
- Order of Merit: (United States) Brian Claar

The 1989 Asia Golf Circuit was the 28th season of the Asia Golf Circuit (formerly the Far East Circuit), the main professional golf tour in Asia since it was established in 1961.

== Schedule ==
The following table lists official events during the 1989 season.

| Date | Tournament | Host country | Purse (US$) | Winner (Note: The number in brackets after each winner's name is the number of Asia Golf Circuit events they had won up to and including that tournament. This information is only shown for Asia Golf Circuit members.) | OWGR points | Other tours (Note: JPN − PGA of Japan Tour.) | Notes |
|---|---|---|---|---|---|---|---|
| 12 Feb | San Miguel/Coca-Cola Philippine Open | Philippines | 140,000 | (United States) Emlyn Aubrey (1) | 8 | | |
| 19 Feb | Johnnie Walker Hong Kong Open | Hong Kong | 175,000 | (United States) Brian Claar (1) | 8 | | |
| 26 Feb | Thai International Thailand Open | Thailand | 150,000 | (United States) Brian Claar (2) | 8 | | |
| 5 Mar | Pakistan Open | Pakistan | 120,000 | (Philippines) Frankie Miñoza (3) | 8 | | New to Asia Golf Circuit |
| 12 Mar | Wills Indian Open | India | 120,000 | (Canada) Rémi Bouchard (1) | 8 | | |
| 19 Mar | Singapore Open | Singapore | 220,000 | (Taiwan) Lu Chien-soon (6) | 8 | | |
| 25 Mar | Indonesia Open | Indonesia | 120,000 | (Indonesia) Kasiyadi (1) | 8 | | |
| 2 Apr | Benson & Hedges Malaysian Open | Malaysia | 175,000 | (United States) Jeff Maggert (1) | 8 | | |
| 9 Apr | Taiwan Open | Taiwan | 200,000 | (Taiwan) Lu Chien-soon (7) | 6 | | |
| 16 Apr | Maekyung Open | South Korea | 150,000 | (Taiwan) Lu Hsi-chuen (11) | 8 | | |
| 23 Apr | Dunlop Open | Japan | ¥60,000,000 | (Australia) Terry Gale (6) | 18 | JPN | |

=== Unofficial events ===
The following events were sanctioned by the Asia Golf Circuit, but did not carry official money, nor were wins official.

| Date | Tournament | Host country | Purse ($) | Winner | Notes |
|---|---|---|---|---|---|
| 5 Feb | Carlsberg Philippine Masters | Philippines | ₱2,000,000 | (Philippines) George Olaybar | |

== Order of Merit ==
The Order of Merit was based on tournament results during the season, calculated using a points-based system.

| Position | Player | Points |
|---|---|---|
| 1 | (United States) Brian Claar | 882 |
| 2 | (United States) Emlyn Aubrey | 732 |
| 3 | (Mexico) Carlos Espinosa | 682 |
| 4 | (Philippines) Frankie Miñoza | 638 |
| 5 | (Taiwan) Lu Chien-soon | 595 |
