= 1997–98 Asia Golf Circuit =

Golf tour season

1997–98 Asia Golf Circuit season
- Duration: 1 May 1997 – 3 May 1998
- Number of official events: 7
- Most wins: (Philippines) Frankie Miñoza (4)
- Order of Merit: (Philippines) Frankie Miñoza
- Rookie of the Year: (Hong Kong) Scott Rowe

The 1997–98 Asia Golf Circuit was the 37th season of the Asia Golf Circuit (formerly the Far East Circuit), one of the main professional golf tours in Asia (outside of Japan) alongside the Asian PGA Tour.

== OWGR discontinuation ==
From 1998 onwards, the Asia Golf Circuit was discontinued from the Official World Golf Ranking. The 1997 Maekyung LG Fashion Open was the final event to receive OWGR points.

== Schedule ==
The following table lists official events during the 1997–98 season.

Date	Tournament	Host country	Purse (US$)	Winner (Note: The number in brackets after each winner's name is the number of Asia Golf Circuit events they had won up to and including that tournament. This information is only shown for Asia Golf Circuit members.)	OWGR points	Other tours (Note: JPN − PGA of Japan Tour; KOR − Korean Tour.)	Notes
4 May	Maekyung LG Fashion Open	South Korea	400,000	(South Korea) Shin Yong-jin (1)	12	KOR	
15 Feb	Ericsson Philippine Masters	Philippines	100,000	(Philippines) Frankie Miñoza (7)	n/a		Upgraded to official event
22 Feb	Benson & Hedges Malaysian Open	Malaysia	300,000	(England) Ed Fryatt (3)	n/a		
1 Mar	Rolex Masters	Singapore	300,000	(Philippines) Frankie Miñoza (8)	n/a		
22 Mar	Philippine Open	Philippines	250,000	(Philippines) Frankie Miñoza (9)	n/a		
26 Apr	Kirin Open	Japan	¥100,000,000	(Philippines) Frankie Miñoza (10)	24	JPN	
3 May	Maekyung LG Fashion Open	South Korea	₩350,000,000	(Hong Kong) Scott Rowe (1)	n/a	KOR	

== Order of Merit ==
The Order of Merit was based on prize money won during the season, calculated in U.S. dollars. The leading player on the Order of Merit earned status to play on the 1998 PGA of Japan Tour.

Position	Player	Prize money ($)
1	(Philippines) Frankie Miñoza	252,048
2	(England) Ed Fryatt	90,352
3	(Canada) Jim Rutledge	85,614
4	(Hong Kong) Scott Rowe	77,678
5	(South Korea) Shin Yong-jin	73,833

== Awards ==
Award	Winner	Ref.
Rookie of the Year (Tun Abdul Hamid Omar Award)	(Hong Kong) Scott Rowe	

== See also ==
- 1997 Asian PGA Tour
- 1998 Asian PGA Tour
