= Thailand Open (golf) =

Tournament information
- Location: Pathum Thani, Thailand
- Established: 1965
- Course: Riverdale Golf Club
- Par: 71
- Length: 6,988 yards (6,390 m)
- Tours: Japan Golf Tour; Asian Tour; All Thailand Golf Tour; OneAsia Tour; Asia Golf Circuit
- Format: Stroke play
- Prize fund: ฿7,000,000
- Month played: December

Tournament record score
- Aggregate: 261 Sadom Kaewkanjana (2021); 261 Kwanchai Tannin (2022)
- To par: −24 Prayad Marksaeng (2013)

Current champion
- (Malaysia) Edven Ying

Final champion
- Location in Thailand

The Thailand Open is the national golf open of Thailand.

== History ==
It was founded as an event on the Far East Circuit, later renamed as the Asia Golf Circuit. It remained on the circuit until 1997, after which it became an event on the Asian Tour, where it remained until 2009. From 2010 to 2015, it was part of the fledgling OneAsia tour's schedule, co-sanctioned in 2013 and 2015 by the Japan Golf Tour, before returning to the Asian Tour in 2017.

== Winners ==
Year	Tour(s) (Note: AGC/FEC − Asia Golf Circuit/Far East Circuit; ASA − Asian Tour; ATGT − All Thailand Golf Tour; JPN − Japan Golf Tour; ONE − OneAsia Tour.)	Winner	Score	To par	Margin of victory	Runner(s)-up	Ref.
Thailand Open
2025	ATGT	(Malaysia) Edven Ying	264	−20	2 strokes	(Thailand) Nopparat Panichphol (Thailand) Pavit Tangkamolprasert	
2024	ATGT	(Thailand) Chayutpol Kittirattanapaiboon	264	−20	1 stroke	(Thailand) Newport Laparojkit	
2023	ATGT	(Thailand) Denwit Boriboonsub	262	−22	1 stroke	(Thailand) Natipong Srithong	
2022	ATGT	(Thailand) Kwanchai Tannin	261	−23	4 strokes	(Thailand) Newport Laparojkit	
2021	ATGT	(Thailand) Sadom Kaewkanjana	261	−23	4 strokes	(Thailand) Prom Meesawat	
2020: No tournament
2019	ASA	(United States) John Catlin	273	−11	Playoff (Note: Catlin won with a birdie on the first hole of a sudden death playoff.)	(India) Shiv Kapur (Thailand) Pavit Tangkamolprasert	
2018	ASA	(Thailand) Panuphol Pittayarat	267	−13	1 stroke	(Thailand) Poom Saksansin	
2017	ASA	(Thailand) Rattanon Wannasrichan	263	−21	2 strokes	(India) Gaganjeet Bhullar (India) Shiv Kapur	
2016: No tournament
Singha Corporation Thailand Open
2015	JPN, ONE	(South Korea) Kim Kyung-tae	267	−21	3 strokes	(South Korea) Wang Jeung-hun	
Thailand Open
2014	JPN, ONE	Cancelled due to the political crisis in Thailand					
2013	JPN, ONE	(Thailand) Prayad Marksaeng	264	−24	2 strokes	(Australia) Scott Strange	
2012	ONE	(England) Chris Wood	265	−23	2 strokes	(South Korea) Jang Dong-kyu	
2011	ONE	(Australia) Andre Stolz	266	−22	2 strokes	(Thailand) Prayad Marksaeng	
2010	ONE	(China) Liang Wenchong	270	−18	1 stroke	(Thailand) Namchok Tantipokhakul (Australia) Michael Wright	
Singha Thailand Open
2009	ASA	(India) Jyoti Randhawa	263	−17	2 strokes	(Wales) Rhys Davies	
2006–2008: No tournament
Thai Airways International Thailand Open
2005	ASA	(New Zealand) Richard Lee	279	−9	Playoff (Note: Lee won with a par on the first hole of a sudden death playoff.)	(Australia) Scott Barr	
Thailand Open
2004	ASA	(Thailand) Boonchu Ruangkit (2)	270	−18	5 strokes	(South Korea) Kim Jong-duck (Thailand) Prayad Marksaeng	
2003	ASA	(United States) Edward Loar	269	−19	5 strokes	(Australia) Jason Dawes	
2001–02: No tournament
2000	ASA	(South Africa) Des Terblanche	269	−19	1 stroke	(Thailand) Thongchai Jaidee	
Mittweida Thailand Open
1999	ASA	(United States) Fran Quinn	275	−13	1 stroke	(United States) Christian Peña (Canada) Jim Rutledge (Scotland) Simon Yates	
Thailand Open
1998	ASA	(South Africa) James Kingston	272	−16	Playoff (Note: Kingston won with a par on the first hole of a sudden death playoff.)	(India) Jeev Milkha Singh	
Thai Airways Thailand Open
1997	AGC	(United States) Christian Chernock	268	−20	1 stroke	(United States) Don Walsworth	
1996	AGC	(United States) Todd Barranger	271	−17	5 strokes	(United States) Rob Moss	
1995	AGC	(United States) Todd Hamilton	271	−17	Playoff (Note: Hamilton won with a par on the second hole of a sudden death playoff.)	(United States) Steve Veriato	
Thailand Open
1994	AGC	(United States) Brandt Jobe	276	−12	4 strokes	(United States) Lee Porter	
Thai International Thailand Open
1993	AGC	(Australia) Craig Mann	278	−10	Playoff (Note: Mann won with a birdie on the second hole of a sudden death playoff; Flesch was eliminated on the first extra hole.)	(United States) Steve Flesch (Taiwan) Hsieh Chin-sheng	
1992	AGC	(Thailand) Boonchu Ruangkit	275	−13	4 strokes	(Australia) Richard Backwell (Canada) Rémi Bouchard (Thailand) Thaworn Wiratchant	
1991	AGC	(Thailand) Suthep Meesawat	272	−16	1 stroke	(Philippines) Robert Pactolerin	
1990	AGC	(Taiwan) Lu Wen-teh	276	−12	1 stroke	(Canada) Danny Mijovic (South Korea) Park Nam-sin	
1989	AGC	(United States) Brian Claar	272	−16	3 strokes	(United States) E. J. Pfister	
1988	AGC	(Australia) Jeff Senior	276	−12	2 strokes	(Taiwan) Lu Hsi-chuen	
1987	AGC	(Taiwan) Chen Tze-ming (2)	272	−12	Playoff (Note: Chen won with a birdie on the third hole of a sudden death playoff.)	(Thailand) Somsak Srisanga	
Thailand Open
1986	AGC	(Taiwan) Ho Ming-chung	288	E	1 stroke	(Taiwan) Lu Chien-soon	
1985	AGC	(United States) Bill Israelson	273	−15	1 stroke	(United States) John Jacobs	
1984	AGC	(Taiwan) Lu Chien-soon	278	−10	6 strokes	(Australia) Wayne Grady	
1983	AGC	(Taiwan) Chen Tze-ming	283	−5	1 stroke	(United States) Lou Graham (Taiwan) Lu Chien-soon (Philippines) Frankie Miñoza	
1982	AGC	(Taiwan) Hsu Sheng-san (2)	281	−7	Playoff (Note: Hsu won with a birdie (conceded) on the first hole of a sudden death playoff.)	(Taiwan) Shen Chung-shyan	
1981	AGC	(United States) Tom Sieckmann	281	−7	3 strokes	(United States) Gaylord Burrows (Japan) Yutaka Hagawa (United States) Payne Stewart	
1980	AGC	(Taiwan) Lu Hsi-chuen	274	−14	3 strokes	(Southern Rhodesia) Mark McNulty	
1979	AGC	(United States) Mike Krantz	282	−2	Playoff (Note: Krantz won with a birdie on the first hole of a sudden death playoff.)	(Brazil) Jaime Gonzalez	
1978	AGC	(Taiwan) Hsu Sheng-san	280	−8	3 strokes	(United States) Bruce Douglass	
1977	AGC	(Japan) Yurio Akitomi	284	−4	Playoff (Note: Akitomi won with a par on the seventh hole of a sudden death playoff; Takeyasu was eliminated on the second extra hole.)	(United States) Marty Bohen (Japan) Takahiro Takeyasu	
1976	AGC	(Philippines) Ben Arda	270	−18	4 strokes	(Thailand) Sukree Onsham	
1975	AGC	(United States) Howard Twitty	285	−3	2 strokes	(United States) Tom Purtzer	
1974	AGC	(Japan) Toshiro Hitomi	291	+3	1 stroke	(United States) Gaylord Burrows (New Zealand) Walter Godfrey (Taiwan) Hsu Chi-san (Philippines) Ireneo Legaspi (Thailand) Pradhana Ngarmprom	
1973	AGC	(Australia) Graham Marsh	286	−2	2 strokes	(Philippines) Ben Arda (Japan) Mitsutaka Kono	
1972	AGC	(Taiwan) Hsieh Min-Nan	278	−10	6 strokes	(Taiwan) Hsu Sheng-san	
1971	AGC	(Taiwan) Lu Liang-Huan	278	−10	1 stroke	(United States) David Oakley	
1970	AGC	(Australia) David Graham	286	−2	1 stroke	(Taiwan) Hsieh Min-Nan	
1969	AGC	(Taiwan) Hsieh Yung-yo (2)	277	−11	8 strokes	(Taiwan) Hsu Chi-san	
1968	AGC	(Australia) Randall Vines	285	−3	1 stroke	(Japan) Haruo Yasuda	
1967	FEC	(Japan) Tomoo Ishii	283	−5	4 strokes	(England) Tony Jacklin (Taiwan) Kuo Chie-Hsiung	
1966	FEC	(Japan) Tadashi Kitta	283	−5	2 strokes	(South Africa) Harold Henning	
1965	FEC	(Taiwan) Hsieh Yung-yo	283	−5	6 strokes	(Taiwan) Kuo Chie-Hsiung (Philippines) Dionisio Nadales (Japan) Koichi Ono (Japan) Hideyo Sugimoto (Japan) Shigeru Uchida	

== See also ==
- Open golf tournament
