= 1983 Asia Golf Circuit =

Golf tour season

1983 Asia Golf Circuit season
- Duration: 17 February 1983 – 24 April 1983
- Number of official events: 10
- Order of Merit: (Taiwan) Lu Chien-soon

The 1983 Asia Golf Circuit was the 22nd season of the Asia Golf Circuit (formerly the Far East Circuit), the main professional golf tour in Asia since it was established in 1961.

== Schedule ==
The following table lists official events during the 1983 season.

Date	Tournament	Host country	Purse (US$)	Winner (Note: The number in brackets after each winner's name is the number of Asia Golf Circuit events they had won up to and including that tournament. This information is only shown for Asia Golf Circuit members.)	Other tours (Note: JPN − PGA of Japan Tour.)	Notes
20 Feb	Philippine Open	Philippines	150,000	(Taiwan) Lu Hsi-chuen (8)		
27 Feb	Cathay Pacific Hong Kong Open	Hong Kong	150,000	(Australia) Greg Norman (n/a)		
6 Mar	Benson & Hedges Malaysian Open	Malaysia	150,000	(Australia) Terry Gale (2)		
13 Mar	Singapore Open	Singapore	100,000	(Taiwan) Lu Chien-soon (1)		
20 Mar	Indonesia Open	Indonesia	75,000	(United States) Robert Wrenn (n/a)		
27 Mar	Thailand Open	Thailand	75,000	(Taiwan) Chen Tze-ming (5)		
3 Apr	Indian Open	India	75,000	(Japan) Junichi Takahashi (1)		
10 Apr	Taiwan Open	Taiwan	100,000	(Taiwan) Lu Liang-Huan (9)		
17 Apr	Maekyung Open	South Korea	100,000	(Japan) Hiroshi Yamada (1)		
24 Apr	Dunlop International Open	Japan	¥40,000,000	(United States) Larry Nelson (n/a)	JPN	

== Order of Merit ==
The Order of Merit was based on tournament results during the season, calculated using a points-based system.

Position	Player	Points
1	(Taiwan) Lu Chien-soon	659
2	(Taiwan) Hsieh Yu-shu	611
3	(Taiwan) Lu Hsi-chuen	599
4	(United States) Bob Tway	568
5	(Taiwan) Chen Tze-ming	525
