= 1976 Asia Golf Circuit =

Golf tour season

1976 Asia Golf Circuit season
- Duration: 19 February 1976 – 25 April 1976
- Number of official events: 10
- Most wins: (Philippines) Ben Arda (2)
- Order of Merit: (Taiwan) Hsu Sheng-san

The 1976 Asia Golf Circuit was the 15th season of the Asia Golf Circuit (formerly the Far East Circuit), the main professional golf tour in Asia since it was established in 1961.

== Schedule ==
The following table lists official events during the 1976 season.

Date	Tournament	Host country	Purse (US$)	Winner (Note: The number in brackets after each winner's name is the number of Asia Golf Circuit events they had won up to and including that tournament. This information is only shown for Asia Golf Circuit members.)	Other tours (Note: JPN − PGA of Japan Tour.)	Notes
22 Feb	Philippine Open	Philippines	60,000	(Philippines) Quintin Mancao (1)		
29 Feb	Taiwan Open	Taiwan	30,000	(Taiwan) Hsu Chi-san (2)		
7 Mar	Thailand Open	Thailand	25,000	(Philippines) Ben Arda (6)		
14 Mar	Singapore Open	Singapore	45,000	(Japan) Kesahiko Uchida (1)		
21 Mar	Indonesia Open	Indonesia	25,000	(Myanmar) Mya Aye (1)		
28 Mar	Malaysian Open	Malaysia	30,000	(Taiwan) Hsu Sheng-san (3)		
4 Apr	Indian Open	India	25,000	(Australia) Peter Thomson (5)		
11 Apr	Hong Kong Open	Hong Kong	40,000	(Taiwan) Ho Ming-chung (1)		
18 Apr	Korea Open	South Korea	25,000	(Japan) Katsunari Takahashi (1)		
25 Apr	Sobu International Open	Japan	75,000	(Philippines) Ben Arda (7)	JPN	

=== Unofficial events ===
The following events were sanctioned by the Asia Golf Circuit, but did not carry official money, nor were wins official.

Date	Tournament	Host country	Purse ($)	Winner	Notes
15 Feb	Philippine Masters	Philippines	20,000	(Philippines) Ben Arda	Limited-field event

== Order of Merit ==
The Order of Merit was based on tournament results during the season, calculated using a points-based system.

Position	Player	Points
1	(Taiwan) Hsu Sheng-san	164
2	(Philippines) Ben Arda	155
3	(Taiwan) Kuo Chie-Hsiung	113
4	(Taiwan) Hsu Chi-san	83
5	(Myanmar) Mya Aye	79
