= 1991 Asia Golf Circuit =

Golf tour season

1991 Asia Golf Circuit season
- Duration: 7 February 1991 – 28 April 1991
- Number of official events: 10
- Order of Merit: (Canada) Rick Gibson
- Rookie of the Year: (United States) Gerry Norquist

The 1991 Asia Golf Circuit was the 30th season of the Asia Golf Circuit (formerly the Far East Circuit), the main professional golf tour in Asia since it was established in 1961.

== Schedule ==
The following table lists official events during the 1991 season.

| Date | Tournament | Host country | Purse (US$) | Winner (Note: The number in brackets after each winner's name is the number of Asia Golf Circuit events they had won up to and including that tournament. This information is only shown for Asia Golf Circuit members.) | OWGR points | Other tours (Note: JPN − PGA of Japan Tour.) | Notes |
|---|---|---|---|---|---|---|---|
| 10 Feb | Hutchison Telecom Hong Kong Open | Hong Kong | 200,000 | (Germany) Bernhard Langer (n/a) | 16 | | |
| 17 Feb | Philippine Open | Philippines | 150,000 | (United States) Dennis Paulson (1) | 8 | | |
| 24 Feb | Epson Singapore Open | Singapore | 400,000 | (Canada) Jack Kay Jr. (1) | 8 | | |
| 3 Mar | Benson & Hedges Malaysian Open | Malaysia | 200,000 | (Canada) Rick Gibson (1) | 8 | | |
| 9 Mar | Indonesia Open | Indonesia | 150,000 | (Taiwan) Chen Liang-hsi (2) | 8 | | |
| 24 Mar | Wills Indian Open | India | 150,000 | (India) Ali Sher (1) | 8 | | |
| 31 Mar | Thai International Thailand Open | Thailand | 150,000 | (Thailand) Suthep Meesawat (1) | 8 | | |
| 14 Apr | Sanyang Republic of China Open | Taiwan | 300,000 | (United States) John Jacobs (3) | 8 | | |
| 21 Apr | Maekyung Open | South Korea | 300,000 | (South Korea) Choi Sang-ho (1) | 8 | | |
| 28 Apr | Dunlop Open | Japan | ¥100,000,000 | (Australia) Roger Mackay (n/a) | 20 | JPN | |

=== Unofficial events ===
The following events were sanctioned by the Asia Golf Circuit, but did not carry official money, nor were wins official.

| Date | Tournament | Host country | Purse ($) | Winner | Notes |
|---|---|---|---|---|---|
| 10 Feb | Carlsberg Philippine Masters | Philippines | ₱2,000,000 | (Philippines) Robert Pactolerin | |
| 7 Apr | Rolex Masters | Singapore | S$150,000 | (Mexico) Carlos Espinosa | |

== Order of Merit ==
The Order of Merit was based on tournament results during the season, calculated using a points-based system. The leading player on the Order of Merit earned status to play on the 1991 PGA of Japan Tour.

| Position | Player | Points |
|---|---|---|
| 1 | (Canada) Rick Gibson | 868 |
| 2 | (Taiwan) Chen Liang-hsi | 863 |
| 3 | (Taiwan) Chen Tze-chung | 549 |
| 4 | (United States) Gerry Norquist | 525 |
| 5 | (United States) Dennis Paulson | 507 |

== Awards ==
| Award | Winner | Ref. |
|---|---|---|
| Rookie of the Year (Tun Abdul Hamid Omar Award) | (United States) Gerry Norquist | |
