= 1986 Asia Golf Circuit =

Golf tour season

1986 Asia Golf Circuit season
- Duration: 27 February 1986 – 27 April 1986
- Number of official events: 9
- Most wins: (Taiwan) Lu Hsi-chuen (2)
- Order of Merit: (Taiwan) Lu Hsi-chuen

The 1986 Asia Golf Circuit was the 25th season of the Asia Golf Circuit (formerly the Far East Circuit), the main professional golf tour in Asia since it was established in 1961.

== Schedule ==
The following table lists official events during the 1986 season.

Date	Tournament	Host country	Purse (US$)	Winner (Note: The number in brackets after each winner's name is the number of Asia Golf Circuit events they had won up to and including that tournament. This information is only shown for Asia Golf Circuit members.)	OWGR points	Other tours (Note: JPN − PGA of Japan Tour.)	Notes
2 Mar	Cathay Pacific Hong Kong Open	Hong Kong	150,000	(Japan) Seiichi Kanai (1)	10		
9 Mar	Benson & Hedges Malaysian Open	Malaysia	150,000	(Australia) Stewart Ginn (2)	10		
16 Mar	Singapore Open	Singapore	125,000	(New Zealand) Greg Turner (1)	10		
23 Mar	Indonesia Open	Indonesia	100,000	(Philippines) Frankie Miñoza (1)	10		
30 Mar	Thailand Open	Thailand	100,000	(Taiwan) Ho Ming-chung (4)	10		
6 Apr	Charminar Challenge Indian Open	India	100,000	(Taiwan) Lu Hsi-chuen (9)	10		
13 Apr	Taiwan Open	Taiwan	120,000	(Taiwan) Lu Hsi-chuen (10)	10		
20 Apr	Maekyung Open	South Korea	130,000	(Taiwan) Tsao Chien-teng (1)	10		
27 Apr	Dunlop International Open	Japan	¥50,000,000	(Japan) Hideto Shigenobu (n/a)	20	JPN	

=== Unofficial events ===
The following events were sanctioned by the Asia Golf Circuit, but did not carry official money, nor were wins official.

Date	Tournament	Host country	Purse ($)	Winner	Notes
23 Feb	Philippine Open	Philippines	21,000	(Philippines) Mario Manubay	

== Order of Merit ==
The Order of Merit was based on tournament results during the season, calculated using a points-based system.

Position	Player	Points
1	(Taiwan) Lu Hsi-chuen	798
2	(Taiwan) Ho Ming-chung	584
3	(Taiwan) Hsieh Yu-shu	553
4	(Taiwan) Tsao Chien-teng	544
5	(Taiwan) Lu Chien-soon	538
