= Rolex Masters =

Golf tournament

Tournament information
- Location: Singapore
- Established: 1973
- Course: Singapore Island Country Club
- Par: 72
- Tour: Asia Golf Circuit
- Format: Stroke play
- Prize fund: US$300,000
- Month played: February/March
- Final year: 1998

Tournament record score
- Aggregate: 268 Kyi Hla Han (1997)
- To par: −20 as above

Final champion
- (Philippines) Frankie Miñoza
- Location in Singapore

The Rolex Masters was a golf tournament held in Singapore from 1973 to 1998. It was played on the Singapore Island Country Club's Bukit course. For the first three years it was played as a 54-hole invitation event, before extending to 72-holes in 1976. The event served as the final tournament of the Singapore Golf Circuit and was usually held the week prior to the Singapore Open.

In 1993, when the Singapore Open was moved to the PGA Tour of Australasia, the Rolex Masters took the dates on the Asia Golf Circuit as an "approved event". In 1995, it became a counting event for the tour's Order of Merit.

== Winners ==
Year	Tour (Note: AGC − Asia Golf Circuit.)	Winner	Score	To par	Margin of victory	Runner(s)-up	Ref.
1998	AGC	(Philippines) Frankie Miñoza	273	−15	1 stroke	(Canada) Jim Rutledge	
1997	AGC	(Myanmar) Kyi Hla Han	268	−20	2 strokes	(England) Ed Fryatt (Taiwan) Yeh Chang-ting	
1996	AGC	(United States) Mike Cunning	204 (Note: Shortened to 54 holes due to rain.)	−9	1 stroke	(United States) Peter Teravainen (United States) Don Walsworth	
1995	AGC	(United States) Ron Wuensche	269	−15	3 strokes	(United States) Bob May	
1994	AGC (Note: In 1988, 1991, 1993 and 1994, the event was sanctioned by the Asia Golf Circuit, however it was an unofficial money event; therefore the win is considered unofficial on that tour.)	(Malaysia) Marimuthu Ramayah	278	−10	Playoff	(United States) Al Norris	
1993	AGC	(Japan) Norikazu Kawakami	271	−13	1 stroke	(United States) Brandt Jobe	
1992	AGC	(United States) Todd Hamilton	274	−10	4 strokes	(United States) Gerry Norquist (United States) Lee Porter	
1991	AGC	(Mexico) Carlos Espinosa	275	−9	3 strokes	(Myanmar) Kyi Hla Han (United States) Gerry Norquist	
1990		(Taiwan) Chou Hung-nan	279				
1989		(Taiwan) Lu Chien-soon	282				
1988	AGC	(United States) Greg Bruckner	274	−10	3 strokes	(United States) Jeff Cook (United States) Jeff Maggert (United States) Tray Tyner	
1987		(Taiwan) Chen Tze-ming (2)	274				
1986		(United States) John Jacobs	280				
1985		(Taiwan) Chen Tze-ming	273				
1984		(United States) Bill Israelson	276				
1983		(Philippines) Rudy Labares	279				
1982		(Taiwan) Chang Chung-fa (3)	280				
1981		(Taiwan) Hsu Chi-san	276				
1980		(Taiwan) Chang Chung-fa (2)	279				
1979		(Singapore) Lim Swee Chew (2)	282				
1978		(Australia) Alan Murray (3)	287				
1977		(Taiwan) Chang Chung-fa	287				
1976		(Singapore) Mayalagan Marimuthu	286				
1975		(Australia) Alan Murray (2)	217				
1974		(Singapore) Lim Swee Chew	213				
1973		(Australia) Alan Murray	220				
