= 1988 Asia Golf Circuit =

Golf tour season

1988 Asia Golf Circuit season
- Duration: 11 February 1988 – 24 April 1988
- Number of official events: 10
- Most wins: (Taiwan) Hsieh Chin-sheng (2)
- Order of Merit: (Taiwan) Lu Chien-soon

The 1988 Asia Golf Circuit was the 27th season of the Asia Golf Circuit (formerly the Far East Circuit), the main professional golf tour in Asia since it was established in 1961.

== Schedule ==
The following table lists official events during the 1988 season.

Date	Tournament	Host country	Purse (US$)	Winner (Note: The number in brackets after each winner's name is the number of Asia Golf Circuit events they had won up to and including that tournament. This information is only shown for Asia Golf Circuit members.)	OWGR points	Other tours (Note: JPN − PGA of Japan Tour.)	Notes
14 Feb	Unisys Hong Kong Open	Hong Kong	150,000	(Taiwan) Hsieh Chin-sheng (1)	10		
21 Feb	Coca-Cola Philippine Open	Philippines	120,000	(Taiwan) Hsieh Chin-sheng (2)	8		
6 Mar	Benson & Hedges Malaysian Open	Malaysia	150,000	(United States) Tray Tyner (1)	8		
13 Mar	Singapore Open	Singapore	220,000	(United States) Greg Bruckner (1)	8		
19 Mar	Indonesia Open	Indonesia	100,000	(Taiwan) Hsieh Yu-shu (1)	8		
27 Mar	Thai International Thailand Open	Thailand	100,000	(Australia) Jeff Senior (1)	8		
3 Apr	Charminar Challenge Indian Open	India	100,000	(Taiwan) Lu Chien-soon (5)	8		
10 Apr	Taiwan Open	Taiwan	170,000	(Mexico) Carlos Espinosa (1)	8		
17 Apr	Maekyung Open	South Korea	140,000	(Philippines) Frankie Miñoza (2)	8		
24 Apr	Dunlop Open	Japan	¥60,000,000	(Japan) Masashi Ozaki (n/a)	20	JPN	

=== Unofficial events ===
The following events were sanctioned by the Asia Golf Circuit, but did not carry official money, nor were wins official.

Date	Tournament	Host country	Purse ($)	Winner	Notes
28 Feb	Rolex Masters	Singapore	S$100,000	(United States) Greg Bruckner	

== Order of Merit ==
The Order of Merit was based on tournament results during the season, calculated using a points-based system.

Position	Player	Points
1	(Taiwan) Lu Chien-soon	679
2	(Taiwan) Hsieh Chin-sheng	646
3	(United States) Tray Tyner	605
4	(United States) Greg Bruckner	565
5	(Mexico) Carlos Espinosa	531
