= 1982 Asia Golf Circuit =

Golf tour season

1982 Asia Golf Circuit season
- Duration: 18 February 1982 – 25 April 1982
- Number of official events: 10
- Most wins: (Taiwan) Hsu Sheng-san (3)
- Order of Merit: (Taiwan) Hsu Sheng-san

The 1982 Asia Golf Circuit was the 21st season of the Asia Golf Circuit (formerly the Far East Circuit), the main professional golf tour in Asia since it was established in 1961.

== Changes for 1982 ==
There was one change from the previous season, with South Korea founding the Maekyung Open to replace the Korea Open in order to remain part of the circuit and reschedule the national open to later in the year.

== Schedule ==
The following table lists official events during the 1982 season.

Date	Tournament	Host country	Purse (US$)	Winner (Note: The number in brackets after each winner's name is the number of Asia Golf Circuit events they had won up to and including that tournament. This information is only shown for Asia Golf Circuit members.)	Other tours (Note: JPN − PGA of Japan Tour.)	Notes
21 Feb	Philippine Open	Philippines	150,000	(Taiwan) Hsieh Min-Nan (5)		
28 Feb	Cathay Pacific Hong Kong Open	Hong Kong	130,000	(United States) Kurt Cox (3)		
7 Mar	Malaysian Open	Malaysia	150,000	(United States) Denny Helper (1)		
14 Mar	Thailand Open	Thailand	100,000	(Taiwan) Hsu Sheng-san (5)		
21 Mar	Indian Open	India	75,000	(Taiwan) Hsu Sheng-san (6)		
28 Mar	Singapore Open	Singapore	100,000	(Taiwan) Hsu Sheng-san (7)		
4 Apr	Indonesia Open	Indonesia	60,000	(Philippines) Eleuterio Nival (3)		
11 Apr	Taiwan Open	Taiwan	100,000	(Taiwan) Chen Tze-ming (4)		
18 Apr	Maekyung Open	South Korea	90,000	(South Korea) Kim Joo-heun (a) (1)		New tournament
25 Apr	Dunlop International Open	Japan	150,000	(Japan) Tsuneyuki Nakajima (n/a)	JPN	

== Order of Merit ==
The Order of Merit was based on tournament results during the season, calculated using a points-based system.

Position	Player	Points
1	(Taiwan) Hsu Sheng-san	925
2	(United States) Denny Hepler	687
3	(Taiwan) Lu Hsi-chuen	674
4	(Taiwan) Hsieh Min-Nan	611
5	(Taiwan) Chen Tze-chung	586
