= 1985 Asia Golf Circuit =

Golf tour season

1985 Asia Golf Circuit season
- Duration: 28 February 1985 – 28 April 1985
- Number of official events: 9
- Most wins: (Taiwan) Chen Tze-chung (2)
- Order of Merit: (Taiwan) Chen Tze-ming

The 1985 Asia Golf Circuit was the 24th season of the Asia Golf Circuit (formerly the Far East Circuit), the main professional golf tour in Asia since it was established in 1961.

== Schedule ==
The following table lists official events during the 1985 season.

Date	Tournament	Host country	Purse (US$)	Winner (Note: The number in brackets after each winner's name is the number of Asia Golf Circuit events they had won up to and including that tournament. This information is only shown for Asia Golf Circuit members.)	Other tours (Note: JPN − PGA of Japan Tour.)	Notes
3 Mar	Cathay Pacific Hong Kong Open	Hong Kong	150,000	(United States) Mark Aebli (1)		
10 Mar	Benson & Hedges Malaysian Open	Malaysia	150,000	(Australia) Terry Gale (4)		
17 Mar	Thailand Open	Thailand	100,000	(Australia) Bill Israelson (1)		
24 Mar	Indian Open	India	100,000	(Canada) Tony Grimes (1)		
31 Mar	Singapore Open	Singapore	100,000	(Taiwan) Chen Tze-ming (6)		
7 Apr	Indonesia Open	Indonesia	100,000	(Taiwan) Lu Chien-soon (4)		
14 Apr	Taiwan Open	Taiwan	120,000	(Taiwan) Lu Liang-Huan (10)		
21 Apr	Maekyung Open	South Korea	120,000	(Taiwan) Chen Tze-chung (1)		
28 Apr	Dunlop International Open	Japan	200,000	(Taiwan) Chen Tze-chung (2)	JPN	

=== Unofficial events ===
The following events were sanctioned by the Asia Golf Circuit, but did not carry official money, nor were wins official.

Date	Tournament	Host country	Purse ($)	Winner	Notes
24 Feb	Philippine Open	Philippines	21,000	(United States) Mark Aebli	

== Order of Merit ==
The Order of Merit was based on tournament results during the season, calculated using a points-based system.

Position	Player	Points
1	(Taiwan) Chen Tze-ming	715
2	(Australia) Rodger Davis	557
