= Indonesia Open (golf) =

Mandiri Indonesia Open
Tournament information
- Location: Jakarta, Indonesia
- Established: 1974
- Course: Pondok Indah Golf Course
- Par: 72
- Length: 7,243 yards (6,623 m)
- Tours: Asian Tour; OneAsia Tour; European Tour; Asia Golf Circuit
- Format: Stroke play
- Prize fund: US$500,000
- Month played: August

Tournament record score
- Aggregate: 262 Felipe Aguilar (2008)
- To par: −24 Suteepat Prateeptienchai (2025)

Current champion
- (Thailand) Suteepat Prateeptienchai

Location map
- Location in Indonesia

The Indonesia Open is the national open golf championship of Indonesia, and traditionally held in the capital, Jakarta.

== History ==
The Indonesia Open was founded in 1974 as an event on the Asia Golf Circuit. It remained on the circuit until the end of the 1996 season, after which it joined the rival Asian PGA's Omega Tour for the 1997 season.

Having not been held between 1998 and 2004, the Indonesian Open returned in 2005 as a co-sanctioned event on both the Asian Tour and the European Tour. It remained a fixture on the tours through the 2009 season after which it joined the rival OneAsia tour. In 2012 it was the opening event of that tour's calendar and was also an unofficial event on the Japan Golf Tour. In 2013, it returned to the Asian Tour and moved from March to late November/early December.

In 2005, Thaworn Wiratchant recorded what would have been the record lowest aggregate score on the European Tour with 255 strokes. However, this record is not considered official as preferred lies were in operation throughout the week.

Venues have changed over the years. Current host golf course is Pondok Indah Golf Course south of Jakarta. Jagorawi(New) has hosted the event twice.

== Winners ==
Year	Tour(s) (Note: AGC − Asia Golf Circuit; ASA − Asian Tour (formerly the Asian PGA/Omega/Davidoff Tour); EUR − European Tour; ONE − OneAsia Tour.)	Winner	Score	To par	Margin of victory	Runner(s)-up	Ref.
Mandiri Indonesia Open
2025	ASA	(Thailand) Suteepat Prateeptienchai	264	−24	7 strokes	(Hong Kong) Kho Taichi	
2024	ASA	(England) Steve Lewton	268	−16	Playoff	(Australia) Aaron Wilkin (China) Sampson Zheng	
2023	ASA	(Thailand) Nitithorn Thippong	270	−18	2 strokes	(Australia) Scott Hend (Taiwan) Lee Chieh-po (England) Steve Lewton	
2022	ASA	(India) Gaganjeet Bhullar (3)	268	−20	2 strokes	(India) Rashid Khan (England) Steve Lewton	
2020–21: No tournament
Bank BRI Indonesia Open
2019	ASA	(Argentina) Miguel Ángel Carballo	271	−17	3 strokes	(South Korea) Chang Yi-keun	
2018	ASA	(South Africa) Justin Harding	270	−18	1 stroke	(Zimbabwe) Scott Vincent	
Indonesia Open
2017	ASA	(Thailand) Panuphol Pittayarat	265	−23	5 strokes	(Thailand) Tirawat Kaewsiribandit	
Bank BRI-JCB Indonesia Open
2016	ASA	(India) Gaganjeet Bhullar (2)	272	−16	3 strokes	(Thailand) Danthai Boonma (Thailand) Panuphol Pittayarat (India) Jeev Milkha Singh (United States) Johannes Veerman	
Bank BRI Indonesia Open
2015: No tournament
2014	ASA	(Republic of Ireland) Pádraig Harrington	268	−16	2 strokes	(Thailand) Thanyakon Khrongpha	
Indonesia Open
2013	ASA	(India) Gaganjeet Bhullar	268	−16	3 strokes	(Malaysia) Nicholas Fung (Thailand) Chapchai Nirat	
Enjoy Jakarta Indonesia Open
2012	ONE	(Australia) Nick Cullen	279	−9	1 stroke	(New Zealand) David Smail	
Indonesia Open
2011	ONE	(Thailand) Thaworn Wiratchant (2)	275	−13	1 stroke	(South Korea) Choi Jin-ho (New Zealand) Michael Hendry (Indonesia) Rory Hie	
2010	ONE	(New Zealand) Michael Hendry	269	−19	7 strokes	(China) Liang Wenchong	
Enjoy Jakarta Indonesia Open
2009	ASA, EUR	(Thailand) Thongchai Jaidee	276	−12	2 strokes	(England) Simon Dyson (Sweden) Alex Norén (England) Steve Webster	
Enjoy Jakarta Astro Indonesia Open
2008	ASA, EUR	(Chile) Felipe Aguilar	262	−18	1 stroke	(India) Jeev Milkha Singh	
2007	ASA, EUR	(Finland) Mikko Ilonen	275	−9	1 stroke	(India) Shiv Kapur (Philippines) Frankie Miñoza (Australia) Andrew Tampion	
Enjoy Jakarta HSBC Indonesia Open
2006	ASA, EUR	(England) Simon Dyson	268	−20	2 strokes	(Australia) Andrew Buckle	
Enjoy Jakarta Standard Chartered Indonesia Open
2005	ASA, EUR	(Thailand) Thaworn Wiratchant	255 (Note: Unofficial scoring record due to preferred lies being in place.)	−25	5 strokes	(France) Raphaël Jacquelin	
1998–2004: No tournament
Satelindo Indonesia Open
1997	ASA	(Australia) Craig Parry	280	−8	2 strokes	(South Africa) Des Terblanche	
Indonesia Open
1996	AGC	(England) Ed Fryatt	271	−5	3 strokes	(Sweden) Daniel Chopra (Canada) Jim Rutledge	
Sampoerna Indonesia Open
1995	AGC	(Argentina) José Cantero	277	−11	1 stroke	(Australia) Don Fardon	
1994	AGC	(New Zealand) Frank Nobilo	273	−15	3 strokes	(United States) Jerry Smith	
1993	AGC	(United States) Gary Webb	274	−14	Playoff	(Sweden) Niclas Fasth	
Indonesia Open
1992	AGC	Cancelled					
1991	AGC	(Taiwan) Chen Liang-hsi	277	−11	2 strokes	(Philippines) Frankie Miñoza	
1990	AGC	(Philippines) Frankie Miñoza (2)	275	−5	3 strokes	(Canada) Rick Gibson (Canada) Danny Mijovic	
1989	AGC	(Indonesia) Kasiyadi	269	−11	2 strokes	(Philippines) Frankie Miñoza (United States) Kirk Triplett	
1988	AGC	(Taiwan) Hsieh Yu-shu	264	−16	6 strokes	(Philippines) Mario Siodina	
1987	AGC	(Australia) Wayne Smith	274	−6	2 strokes	(United States) Jim Hallet	
1986	AGC	(Philippines) Frankie Miñoza	270	−10	1 stroke	(Taiwan) Hsieh Yu-shu	
1985	AGC	(Taiwan) Lu Chien-soon	274	−14	1 stroke	(Philippines) Frankie Miñoza	
1984	AGC	(Australia) Terry Gale	280	−8	2 strokes	(Taiwan) Lu Chien-soon	
1983	AGC	(United States) Robert Wrenn	274	−6	4 strokes	(Philippines) Paterno Braza	
1982	AGC	(Philippines) Eleuterio Nival	281	−3	1 stroke	(Australia) Rodger Davis (United States) Denny Hepler	
1981	AGC	(United States) Payne Stewart	283	−5	Playoff (Note: Stewart won with a birdie on the first hole of a sudden-death playoff.)	(Taiwan) Chen Tze-chung (Thailand) Sukree Onsham (Taiwan) Hsu Chi-san	
1980	AGC	(Taiwan) Lu Hsi-chuen (2)	265	−15	8 strokes	(Myanmar) Mya Aye	
1979	AGC	(Taiwan) Lu Hsi-chuen	272	−8	1 stroke	(Myanmar) Mya Aye	
1978	AGC	(Taiwan) Kuo Chie-Hsiung	275	−9	3 strokes	(Taiwan) Hsu Sheng-san (Philippines) Eleuterio Nival	
1977	AGC	(United States) Gaylord Burrows	288	E	Playoff (Note: Burrows won with a par on the third hole of a sudden-death playoff.)	(Myanmar) Mya Aye	
1976	AGC	(Myanmar) Mya Aye	276	−12	4 strokes	(Taiwan) Kuo Chie-Hsiung	
1975	AGC	(Taiwan) Hsu Sheng-san	277	−11	6 strokes	(Taiwan) Hsieh Min-Nan	
1974	AGC	(Philippines) Ben Arda	283	−5	Playoff (Note: Arda won with a birdie on the fifth hole of a sudden-death playoff; Hsu was eliminated at the first extra hole.)	(Taiwan) Hsu Chi-san (Australia) Graham Marsh	

== List of sponsors ==
- Astro (2007–08)
- BNI-Maybank (2007–08, 2012–13, 2017)
- Bank Rakyat Indonesia (2014–2021)
- Bank Mandiri (2017, 2022–present)
- Carlsberg (1974–2006, 2009–11)
- Enjoy Jakarta (2005–13)
- HSBC (2006)
- JCB (2016)
- Standard Chartered (2005)

== See also ==
- Open golf tournament
