= Wang Ter-chang =

Taiwanese golfer

Personal information
- Nationality: Taiwan
- Born: 9 August 1962 (age 64)

Career
- Sport: Golf
- Turned professional: 1985
- Current tour: Asian Tour
- Professional wins: 7

Number of wins by tour
- Asian Tour: 4
- Other: 3

Wang Ter-chang (Chinese: 汪德昌, born 9 August 1962) is a Taiwanese golfer.

== Professional career ==
Wang plays mainly on the Asian Tour. He turned professional in 1985 and has won four Asian Tour titles.

== Professional wins (7) ==
=== Asian Tour wins (4) ===
No.	Date	Tournament	Winning score	Margin of victory	Runner(s)-up
1	9 Nov 1997	Ta Shee Open	−6 (71-70-70-71=282)	1 stroke	(United States) Eric Meeks, (Australia) Leith Wastle
2	31 Jan 1999	London Myanmar Open	−17 (69-69-65-68=271)	3 strokes	(Philippines) Frankie Miñoza, (Japan) Koichi Nogami
3	15 May 2005	Macau Open	−14 (66-69-67-68=270)	1 stroke	(Australia) Marcus Both, (Australia) Jarrod Lyle
4	27 Aug 2006	Brunei Open	−16 (68-70-64-66=268)	Playoff	(Australia) David Gleeson

Asian Tour playoff record (1–0)

No.	Year	Tournament	Opponent	Result
1	2006	Brunei Open	(Australia) David Gleeson	Won with par on second extra hole

=== Asia Golf Circuit wins (1) ===
No.	Date	Tournament	Winning score	Margin of victory	Runner-up
1	23 Feb 1992	Philippine Open	+1 (74-71-71-73=289)	Playoff	(Taiwan) Hsieh Chin-sheng

Asia Golf Circuit playoff record (1–0)

No.	Year	Tournament	Opponent	Result
1	1992	Philippine Open	(Taiwan) Hsieh Chin-sheng	Won with par on first extra hole

=== Taiwan PGA Tour wins (1) ===
No.	Date	Tournament	Winning score	Margin of victory	Runner-up
1	19 Sep 2015	Kaohsiung Open	−12 (69-68-71-68=276)	4 strokes	(Sweden) Malcolm Kokocinski

=== Other wins (1) ===
- 1991 Mercuries Masters

== Team appearances ==
Professional

- Dunhill Cup (representing Taiwan): 1991
- World Cup (representing Taiwan): 1992, 2004, 2005
