= 1993 Asia Golf Circuit =

Golf tour season

1993 Asia Golf Circuit season
- Duration: 11 February 1993 – 25 April 1993
- Number of official events: 9
- Order of Merit: (United States) Brian Watts

The 1993 Asia Golf Circuit was the 32nd season of the Asia Golf Circuit (formerly the Far East Circuit), the main professional golf tour in Asia since it was established in 1961.

== Schedule ==
The following table lists official events during the 1993 season.

Date	Tournament	Host country	Purse (US$)	Winner (Note: The number in brackets after each winner's name is the number of Asia Golf Circuit events they had won up to and including that tournament. This information is only shown for Asia Golf Circuit members.)	OWGR points	Other tours (Note: JPN − PGA of Japan Tour.)	Notes
14 Feb	Kent Hong Kong Open	Hong Kong	250,000	(United States) Brian Watts (1)	18		
21 Feb	Benson & Hedges Malaysian Open	Malaysia	225,000	(United States) Gerry Norquist (1)	26		
7 Mar	Wills Indian Open	India	200,000	(India) Ali Sher (2)	12		
14 Mar	Thai International Thailand Open	Thailand	200,000	(Australia) Craig Mann (1)	12		
21 Mar	Sampoerna Indonesia Open	Indonesia	200,000	(United States) Gary Webb (1)	12		
4 Apr	Philippine Open	Philippines	200,000	(Taiwan) Yeh Chang-ting (1)	12		
11 Apr	Chinfon Republic of China Open	Taiwan	300,000	(Taiwan) Lin Chie-hsiang (2)	12		
18 Apr	Maekyung Open	South Korea	300,000	(South Korea) Park Nam-sin (1)	12		
25 Apr	Dunlop Open	Japan	¥100,000,000	(Japan) Hajime Meshiai (n/a)	20	JPN	

=== Unofficial events ===
The following events were sanctioned by the Asia Golf Circuit, but did not carry official money, nor were wins official.

Date	Tournament	Host country	Purse ($)	Winner	Notes
30 Jan	San Miguel/Coca-Cola Philippine Masters	Philippines	₱2,500,000	(Philippines) Frankie Miñoza	
28 Mar	Rolex Masters	Singapore	S$176,000	(Japan) Norikazu Kawakami	

== Order of Merit ==
The Order of Merit was based on tournament results during the season, calculated using a points-based system. The leading player on the Order of Merit earned status to play on the 1993 PGA of Japan Tour.

Position	Player	Points
1	(United States) Brian Watts	857
2	(Taiwan) Yeh Chang-ting	814
3	(United States) Brandt Jobe	668
4	(Taiwan) Hsieh Chin-sheng	660
5	(United States) Steve Flesch	585
