= Taiwan Open (golf) =

Tournament information
- Location: Taiwan
- Established: 1965
- Tours: Asian Tour; Asia Golf Circuit
- Format: Stroke play

Tournament record score
- Aggregate: 270 Thaworn Wiratchant (2005)
- To par: −18 as above

Final champion
- (Taiwan) Lin Wen-tang

The Taiwan Open was the national open golf tournament of Taiwan. It was also known as the Republic of China Open, ROC Open, Chinese Taipei Open, or simply the China Open. It was founded in 1965, and became an event on the Asia Golf Circuit the following year. The Asian PGA Tour was founded in 1995, and the Asian Circuit declined. The Taiwan Open became an event on the new tour in 1999, and was last held in 2006. It is scheduled to return in 2026, with sponsor Yeangder Group reviving the event, having previously sponsored the Yeangder Tournament Players Championship.

== Venues ==
The following venues have been used since the founding of the Taiwan Open in 1965.

Venue	First	Last	Times
Taiwan Golf and Country Club	1965	1994	16
Linkou International Golf and Country Club	1970	1989	6
Kaohsiung Golf Club	1976	1976	1
Kuo Hua Golf and Country Club	1979	1979	1
New Tamsui Golf Club	1980	1980	1
Hsin Chu Golf and Country Club	1981	1988	3
Chang Gung Golf Club	1986	2005	2
Taoyuan Golf and Country Club	1987	1987	1
Tong Hwa Golf and Country Club	1995	1996	2
Sunrise Golf and Country Club	1997	2006	8
North Bay Golf and Country Club	2004	2004	1

== Winners ==
Year	Tour (Note: AGC/FEC − Asia Golf Circuit/Far East Circuit; ASA − Asian Tour.)	Winner (Note: (a) – Amateur)	Score	To par	Margin of victory	Runner(s)-up	Venue	Ref.
Taiwan Open
2006	ASA	(Taiwan) Lin Wen-tang	275	−13	3 strokes	(Scotland) Simon Yates	Sunrise G&CC	
2005	ASA	(Thailand) Thaworn Wiratchant	270	−18	1 stroke	(Thailand) Chapchai Nirat	Chang Gung GC	
2004	ASA	(South Korea) Charlie Wi	284	−4	3 strokes	(Australia) Terry Pilkadaris	North Bay G&CC	
Acer Taiwan Open
2003	ASA	(Australia) Jason Dawes	284	−4	8 strokes	(India) Jeev Milkha Singh	Sunrise G&CC	
2002	ASA	(Malaysia) Danny Chia	291	+3	2 strokes	(Taiwan) Hsieh Yu-shu (Taiwan) Lin Chie-hsiang	Sunrise G&CC	
2001	ASA	(United States) Andrew Pitts	197 (Note: Shortened to 54 holes due to weather.)	−19	6 strokes	(Singapore) Mardan Mamat	Sunrise G&CC	
Johnnie Walker Taiwan Open
2000	ASA	(Fiji) Vijay Singh	287	−1	Playoff (Note: Singh won with a par on the first hole of a sudden-death playoff.)	(South Africa) Craig Kamps	Sunrise G&CC	
ERA Taiwan Open
1999	ASA	(South Korea) Kang Wook-soon	274	−14	1 stroke	(Myanmar) Kyi Hla Han	Sunrise G&CC	
Mercedes-Benz Taiwan Open
1998		(Taiwan) Lu Chien-soon (2)	281	−7		(Taiwan) Lin Chie-hsiang	Sunrise G&CC	
Republic of China Open
1997		(Taiwan) Tsai Chi-huang	274	−14	7 strokes	(South Africa) André Cruse	Sunrise G&CC	
Chinfon Republic of China Open
1996	AGC	(Taiwan) Hong Chia-yuh (a) (2)	278	−10	12 strokes	(New Zealand) Stuart Holmes (Taiwan) Yu Chin-han	Tong Hwa GC	
1995	AGC	(Sweden) Daniel Chopra	208	−8	1 stroke	(Taiwan) Hsieh Chin-sheng	Tong Hwa GC	
1994	AGC	(Taiwan) Hong Chia-yuh (a)	276	−12	1 stroke	(Thailand) Boonchu Ruangkit	Taiwan G&CC	
1993	AGC	(Taiwan) Lin Chie-hsiang (2)	284	−4	5 strokes	(Mexico) Carlos Espinosa (United States) Brian Watts	Taiwan G&CC	
Sanyang Republic of China Open
1992	AGC	(Taiwan) Lin Chie-hsiang	217	+1	Playoff	(United States) Todd Hamilton (United States) Craig McClellan	Taiwan G&CC	
1991	AGC	(United States) John Jacobs (2)	285	−3	Playoff (Note: Jacobs won with a birdie on the second hole of a sudden-death playoff.)	(Philippines) Antolin Fernando	Taiwan G&CC	
1990	AGC	(Philippines) Frankie Miñoza	283	−5	Playoff (Note: Miñoza won with a birdie on the first hole of a sudden-death playoff.)	(United States) John Morse	Taiwan G&CC	
Taiwan Open
1989	AGC	(Taiwan) Lu Chien-soon	207	−9	1 stroke	(Taiwan) Chen Liang-hsi	Linkou International G&CC	
1988	AGC	(Mexico) Carlos Espinosa	293	+5	1 stroke	(Taiwan) Lin Chie-hsiang	Hsin Chu G&CC	
1987	AGC	(United States) Mark Aebli	294	−2	2 strokes	(Taiwan) Hsieh Yu-shu (United States) Mike Standly	Taoyuan G&CC	
1986	AGC	(Taiwan) Lu Hsi-chuen	212	−4	1 stroke	(United States) Curt Byrum (United States) John Jacobs	Chang Gung CC	
1985	AGC	(Taiwan) Lu Liang-Huan (4)	282	−6	Playoff (Note: Lu won with a par on the sixth hole of a sudden-death playoff; Hsieh was eliminated on the first extra hole.)	(Mexico) Rafael Alarcón (Taiwan) Hsieh Yu-shu	Hsin Chu G&CC	
1984	AGC	(United States) John Jacobs	218	+2	3 strokes	(Taiwan) Hsieh Min-Nan	Taiwan G&CC	
1983	AGC	(Taiwan) Lu Liang-Huan (3)	295	+7	Playoff (Note: Lu won a three-hole playoff by 3 strokes; Lu E, Israelson +3.)	(United States) Bill Israelson	Linkou International G&CC	
1982	AGC	(Taiwan) Chen Tze-ming	289	+1	2 strokes	(Taiwan) Chien Shun-lu (a) (Taiwan) Kuo Chie-Hsiung	Taiwan G&CC	
1981	AGC	(Taiwan) Ho Ming-chung	276	−12	3 strokes	(Taiwan) Lu Hsi-chuen	Hsin Chu G&CC	
1980	AGC	(Taiwan) Kuo Chie-Hsiung (3)	277	−11	4 strokes	(United States) Mike Krantz (Taiwan) Lu Liang-Huan	New Tamsui GC	
1979	AGC	(Taiwan) Lu Liang-Huan (2)	287	−1	2 strokes	(Taiwan) Chen Tze-ming	Kuo Hua G&CC	
1978	AGC	(Taiwan) Hsieh Yung-yo (3)	283	−5	Playoff (Note: Hsieh won on the seventh hole of a sudden-death playoff.)	(Taiwan) Kuo Chie-Hsiung	Taiwan G&CC	
1977	AGC	(Taiwan) Hsieh Min-Nan	276	−12	2 strokes	(Taiwan) Kuo Chie-Hsiung	Linkou International G&CC	
1976	AGC	(Taiwan) Hsu Chi-san (2)	288	E	1 stroke	(Taiwan) Kuo Chie-Hsiung	Kaohsiung GC	
1975	AGC	(Taiwan) Kuo Chie-Hsiung (2)	277	−11	Playoff (Note: Kuo won with a birdie on the fourth hole of a sudden-death playoff.)	(Philippines) Ben Arda (Taiwan) Hsieh Min-Nan	Taiwan G&CC	
1974	AGC	(Taiwan) Kuo Chie-Hsiung	282	−6	2 strokes	(Taiwan) Lu Liang-Huan	Linkou International G&CC	
1973	AGC	(Philippines) Eleuterio Nival	283	−5	1 stroke	(Taiwan) Chang Chung-fa (Taiwan) Ho Ming-chung (Australia) Graham Marsh	Taiwan G&CC	
1972	AGC	(Japan) Haruo Yasuda	284	−4	Playoff (Note: Yasuda won with a birdie on the fifth hole of a sudden-death playoff.)	(Taiwan) Kuo Chie-Hsiung	Taiwan G&CC	
1971	AGC	(Taiwan) Chang Chung-fa (2)	286	−2	1 stroke	(Philippines) Eleuterio Nival	Linkou International G&CC	
1970	AGC	(Taiwan) Chang Chung-fa	215	−1	3 strokes	(Taiwan) Chen Ching-Po	Linkou International G&CC	
1969	AGC	(Japan) Hideyo Sugimoto	284	−4	Playoff (Note: Sugimoto won with a par on the first hole of a sudden-death playoff.)	(Taiwan) Hsu Chi-san	Taiwan G&CC	
1968	AGC	(Taiwan) Hsieh Yung-yo (2)	282	−6	1 stroke	(Taiwan) Kuo Chie-Hsiung	Taiwan G&CC	
1967	FEC	(Taiwan) Hsieh Yung-yo	277	−11	Playoff (Note: Hsieh won with a birdie on the first hole of a sudden-death playoff.)	(Taiwan) Lu Liang-Huan	Taiwan G&CC	
1966	FEC	(Taiwan) Lu Liang-Huan	281	−7	2 strokes	(Taiwan) Chen Chien-chung (Taiwan) Hsu Chi-san (Taiwan) Kuo Chie-Hsiung	Taiwan G&CC	
1965		(Taiwan) Hsu Chi-san	290				Taiwan G&CC	

== See also ==
- Open golf tournament
