= 1984 Asia Golf Circuit =

Golf tour season

1984 Asia Golf Circuit season
- Duration: 23 February 1984 – 22 April 1984
- Number of official events: 9
- Most wins: (United States) John Jacobs (2) (Taiwan) Lu Chien-soon (2)
- Order of Merit: (United States) John Jacobs

The 1984 Asia Golf Circuit was the 23rd season of the Asia Golf Circuit (formerly the Far East Circuit), the main professional golf tour in Asia since it was established in 1961.

== Changes for 1984 ==
Due to economic turmoil in the Philippines, the Philippine Open was dropped from the circuit.

== Schedule ==
The following table lists official events during the 1984 season.

Date	Tournament	Host country	Purse (US$)	Winner (Note: The number in brackets after each winner's name is the number of Asia Golf Circuit events they had won up to and including that tournament. This information is only shown for Asia Golf Circuit members.)	Other tours (Note: JPN − PGA of Japan Tour.)	Notes
26 Feb	Cathay Pacific Hong Kong Open	Hong Kong	150,000	(United States) Bill Brask (2)		
4 Mar	Benson & Hedges Malaysian Open	Malaysia	150,000	(Taiwan) Lu Chien-soon (2)		
11 Mar	Thailand Open	Thailand	100,000	(Taiwan) Lu Chien-soon (3)		
18 Mar	Indian Open	India	100,000	(Mexico) Rafael Alarcón (1)		
25 Mar	Singapore Open	Singapore	100,000	(United States) Tom Sieckmann (3)		
1 Apr	Indonesia Open	Indonesia	100,000	(Australia) Terry Gale (3)		
8 Apr	Taiwan Open	Taiwan	120,000	(United States) John Jacobs (1)		
15 Apr	Maekyung Open	South Korea	110,000	(Australia) Mike Clayton (1)		
22 Apr	Dunlop International Open	Japan	200,000	(United States) John Jacobs (2)	JPN	

=== Unofficial events ===
The following events were sanctioned by the Asia Golf Circuit, but did not carry official money, nor were wins official.

Date	Tournament	Host country	Purse ($)	Winner	Notes
19 Feb	Philippine Open	Philippines	21,000	(Philippines) Rudy Labares	

== Order of Merit ==
The Order of Merit was based on tournament results during the season, calculated using a points-based system.

Position	Player	Points
1	(United States) John Jacobs	702
2	(Taiwan) Lu Chien-soon	669
3	(Taiwan) Lu Hsi-chuen	557
4	(Mexico) Rafael Alarcón	551
5	(Australia) Terry Gale	544
