= Singapore Open (golf) =

Annual golf tournament in Singapore

Coordinates: 1.3°N 103.8°E

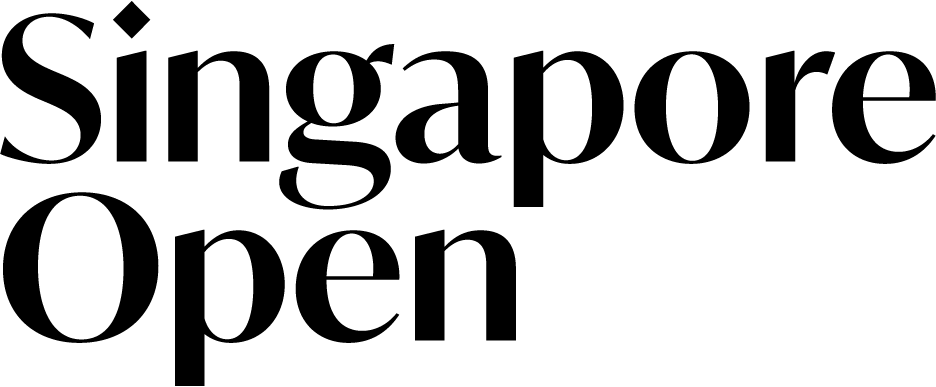
- Tournament logo

Tournament information
- Location: Singapore
- Established: 1961
- Courses: Sentosa Golf Club, The Serapong
- Par: 72
- Length: 7,398 yards (6,765 m)
- Tours: European Tour; Japan Golf Tour; Asian Tour; PGA Tour of Australasia; Asia Golf Circuit
- Format: Stroke play
- Prize fund: US$2,000,000
- Month played: April

Tournament record score
- Aggregate: 266 Jazz Janewattananond (2019); 266 Matt Kuchar (2020)
- To par: −19 Yosuke Asaji (2025) −19 Wang Jeung-hun (2025)

Current champion
- (South Korea) Ham Jeong-woo

Location map
- Location in Singapore

The Singapore Open is a professional golf tournament in Singapore that has been predominantly part of the Asian Tour schedule. The event is one of the region’s most prestigious National Opens – having been played since the early 1960s. It is owned by the Singapore Golf Association (SGA) and is the country’s flagship golf tournament. Since 2017 the event has been part of the Open Qualifying Series, giving up to three non-exempt players entry into The Open Championship.

The Singapore Open was first played in 1961 and was one of the tournaments on the first season of the Far East Circuit (later the Asia Golf Circuit) the following year. It remained part of the Asia circuit until 1993 when it became a fixture on the Australasian Tour. After just 3 seasons, it left the Australasian Tour to join the fledgling Asian Tour for that tour's second season in 1996. The event was also co-sanctioned with the European Tour from 2009 to 2012, and with the Japan Golf Tour since 2016. Since 2025 it has been part of The International Series, the upper-tier level of events on the Asian Tour that provide a pathway to the LIV Golf League.

== History ==
The Singapore Open was founded in 1961 and was staged annually until 2001, when it was won by Thaworn Wiratchant. Other winners in the years leading up to this included American Shaun Micheel in 1998, who went on to win the 2003 PGA Championship. Other notable winners of the event who went on to win majors, include Ángel Cabrera, Adam Scott and Sergio García.

In 2002, the event was cancelled due to a lack of sponsorship. It was revived in 2005 with backing from Sentosa Leisure Group. The 2005 event was played in September and offered prize money of US$2 million, making it the richest tournament on the Asian Tour not co-sanctioned by the European Tour at the time, a status it retained until the event was first co-sanctioned by the European Tour in 2009.

The 2006 Singapore Open offered a purse of US$3 million with a winner's share of US$475,000. In May 2006, it was announced that Barclays Bank would sponsor the event for five years from 2006 and that the prize fund will be increased to US$4 million in 2007 and US$5 million in 2008. In 2011, the purse was US$6,000,000. The 2013 edition was cancelled due to lack of sponsorship.

After a three-year absence, the tournament returned in January 2016. The event was co-sanctioned by the Asian Tour and Japan Golf Tour. Sumitomo Mitsui Banking Corporation also became the new title sponsor of the event. Song Young-han won the revived event, beating current world number one Jordan Spieth by one shot in the weather-delayed event.

Matt Kuchar won the 2020 event, beating Justin Rose by three shots.

The tournament was not played in 2021 due to the COVID-19 pandemic.

Kweichow Moutai became the tournament's title sponsor in 2025, while The Business Times was announced as the presenting sponsor for the 2026 edition.

In September 2026, it was announced that the 2027 event would return to the European Tour schedule, with Deutsche Bank becoming the title sponsor.

== Venues ==
The following venues have been used since the founding of the Singapore Open in 1961.

Venue	First	Last	Times
Singapore Island Country Club	1961	2025	29
Royal Singapore Golf Club	1962	1962	1
Tanah Merah Country Club	1988	1994	5
Laguna National Golf and Country Club	1996	1996	1
Jurong Country Club	1997	2001	2
Safra Resort	1998	1998	1
Orchid Country Club	1999	1999	1
Sentosa Golf Club	2005	2026	15

== Winners ==
Year	Tour(s) (Note: AGC/FEC − Asia Golf Circuit/Far East Circuit; ANZ − PGA Tour of Australasia; ASA − Asian Tour; EUR − European Tour; JPN − Japan Golf Tour.)	Winner	Score	To par	Margin of victory	Runner(s)-up	Venue	Ref.
Singapore Open
2026	ASA	(South Korea) Ham Jeong-woo	268	−16	2 strokes	(Australia) Cameron John	Sentosa	
Moutai Singapore Open
2025	ASA	(Japan) Yosuke Asaji	269	−19	Playoff	(South Korea) Wang Jeung-hun	Singapore Island	
SMBC Singapore Open
2023–2024: No tournament
2022	ASA, JPN (Note: The 2022 event was sanctioned by the Japan Golf Tour, however it was an unofficial money event; therefore the win is considered unofficial on that tour.)	(Thailand) Sadom Kaewkanjana	271	−13	3 strokes	(Japan) Yuto Katsuragawa (South Korea) Tom Kim	Sentosa	
2021: No tournament due to the COVID-19 pandemic
2020	ASA, JPN	(United States) Matt Kuchar	266	−18	3 strokes	(England) Justin Rose	Sentosa	
2019	ASA, JPN	(Thailand) Jazz Janewattananond	266	−18	2 strokes	(England) Paul Casey (Japan) Yoshinori Fujimoto	Sentosa	
2018	ASA, JPN	(Spain) Sergio García	270	−14	5 strokes	(Japan) Satoshi Kodaira (South Africa) Shaun Norris	Sentosa	
2017	ASA, JPN	(Thailand) Prayad Marksaeng	275	−9	1 stroke	(Thailand) Phachara Khongwatmai (South Africa) Jbe' Kruger (Philippines) Juvic Pagunsan (South Korea) Song Young-han	Sentosa	
2016	ASA, JPN	(South Korea) Song Young-han	272	−12	1 stroke	(United States) Jordan Spieth	Sentosa	
2013–2015: No tournament
Barclays Singapore Open
2012	ASA, EUR	(Italy) Matteo Manassero	271	−13	Playoff	(South Africa) Louis Oosthuizen	Sentosa	
2011	ASA, EUR	(Spain) Gonzalo Fernández-Castaño	199 (Note: Shortened to 54 holes due to weather.)	−14	Playoff	(Philippines) Juvic Pagunsan	Sentosa	
2010	ASA, EUR	(Australia) Adam Scott (3)	267	−17	3 strokes	(Denmark) Anders Hansen	Sentosa	
2009	ASA, EUR	(England) Ian Poulter	274	−10	1 stroke	(China) Liang Wenchong	Sentosa	
2008	ASA	(India) Jeev Milkha Singh	277	−7	1 stroke	(Republic of Ireland) Pádraig Harrington (South Africa) Ernie Els	Sentosa	
2007	ASA	(Argentina) Ángel Cabrera	276	−8	1 stroke	(Fiji) Vijay Singh	Sentosa	
2006	ASA	(Australia) Adam Scott (2)	205	−8	Playoff	(South Africa) Ernie Els	Sentosa	
2005	ASA	(Australia) Adam Scott	271	−13	7 strokes	(England) Lee Westwood	Sentosa	
2002–2004: No tournament
Alcatel Singapore Open
2001	ASA	(Thailand) Thaworn Wiratchant	272	−16	1 stroke	(Taiwan) Hsieh Yu-shu	Jurong	
Singapore Open
2000	ASA	(India) Jyoti Randhawa	268	−20	3 strokes	(South Africa) Hendrik Buhrmann	Singapore Island (Island Course)	
Nokia Singapore Open
1999	ASA	(Australia) Kenny Druce	276	−12	Playoff	(South Africa) Desvonde Botes	Orchid	
Ericsson Singapore Open
1998	ASA	(United States) Shaun Micheel	272	−16	2 strokes	(South Africa) Hendrik Buhrmann	Safra	
SingTel Ericsson Singapore Open
1997	ASA	(Myanmar) Zaw Moe	277	−11	3 strokes	(United States) Fran Quinn	Jurong	
Canon Singapore Open
1996	ASA	(United States) John Kernohan	285	−3	1 stroke	(Australia) Darren Cole (South Africa) Craig Kamps (Australia) Brad King (Australia) Peter Lonard (Australia) Robert Willis	Laguna National	
Epson Singapore Open
1995	ANZ	(Australia) Steven Conran	270	−14	3 strokes	(Australia) Andrew Bonhomme	Singapore Island	
1994	ANZ	(Myanmar) Kyi Hla Han	275	−13	1 stroke	(Australia) Wayne Grady	Tanah Merah	
1993	ANZ	(Australia) Paul Moloney	276	−12	1 stroke	(Australia) Richard Green	Tanah Merah	
1992	AGC	(United States) Bill Israelson	267	−17	6 strokes	(Philippines) Frankie Miñoza	Singapore Island	
1991	AGC	(Canada) Jack Kay Jr.	280	−8	2 strokes	(Australia) Wayne Riley	Tanah Merah	
1990	AGC	(Philippines) Antolin Fernando	273	−11	Playoff	(Philippines) Frankie Miñoza	Singapore Island	
Singapore Open
1989	AGC	(Taiwan) Lu Chien-soon (2)	277	−7	1 stroke	(Mexico) Carlos Espinosa	Tanah Merah	
1988	AGC	(United States) Greg Bruckner	281	−7	1 stroke	(Taiwan) Chung Chun-hsing	Tanah Merah	
1987	AGC	(Australia) Peter Fowler	274	−10	Playoff	(Taiwan) Hsu Sheng-san (United States) Jeff Maggert	Singapore Island	
1986	AGC	(New Zealand) Greg Turner	271	−13	4 strokes	(Canada) Tony Grimes (United States) Duffy Waldorf	Singapore Island	
1985	AGC	(Taiwan) Chen Tze-ming	274	−10	Playoff	(New Zealand) Greg Turner	Singapore Island	
1984	AGC	(United States) Tom Sieckmann	274	−10	2 strokes	(Australia) Terry Gale (Myanmar) Kyi Hla Han (United States) Bill Israelson	Singapore Island	
1983	AGC	(Taiwan) Lu Chien-soon	279	−5	Playoff	(United States) Bill Brask	Singapore Island	
1982	AGC	(Taiwan) Hsu Sheng-san	274	−10	5 strokes	(Australia) Terry Gale	Singapore Island	
1981	AGC	(Myanmar) Mya Aye	273	−11	2 strokes	(Taiwan) Lu Hsi-chuen	Singapore Island	
1980	AGC	(United States) Kurt Cox	276	−8	1 stroke	(Myanmar) Mya Aye (Taiwan) Hsu Sheng-san	Singapore Island	
1979	AGC	(Taiwan) Lu Hsi-chuen	280	−4	Playoff	(Taiwan) Hsu Sheng-san	Singapore Island	
1978	AGC	(Australia) Terry Gale	278	−6	1 stroke	(Myanmar) Mya Aye	Singapore Island	
1977	AGC	(Taiwan) Hsu Chi-san	277	−7	1 stroke	(Philippines) Ben Arda (Myanmar) Mya Aye	Singapore Island	
1976	AGC	(Japan) Kesahiko Uchida	273	−11	2 strokes	(Philippines) Ben Arda	Singapore Island	
1975	AGC	(Japan) Yutaka Suzuki	284	−4	1 stroke	(Taiwan) Hsieh Min-Nan (Taiwan) Kuo Chie-Hsiung	Singapore Island (New Course)	
1974	AGC	(Philippines) Eleuterio Nival	275	−9	4 strokes	(Taiwan) Hsieh Yung-yo	Singapore Island	
1973	AGC	(Philippines) Ben Arda (2)	284	E	Playoff	(Scotland) Norman Wood	Singapore Island	
1972	AGC	(Japan) Takaaki Kono	279	−9	4 strokes	(Japan) Takashi Murakami	Singapore Island (New Course)	
1971	AGC	(Japan) Haruo Yasuda	277	−7	2 strokes	(Japan) Takaaki Kono (Australia) Peter Thomson	Singapore Island	
1970	AGC	(Taiwan) Hsieh Yung-yo (2)	276	−8	2 strokes	(Australia) David Graham (Japan) Haruo Yasuda	Singapore Island	
1969	AGC	(Japan) Tomio Kamata	278	−6	Playoff	(Australia) David Graham (England) Guy Wolstenholme	Singapore Island	
1968	AGC	(Taiwan) Hsieh Yung-yo	275	−9	6 strokes	(South Korea) Han Chang-sang (Japan) Kenji Hosoishi	Singapore Island	
1967	FEC	(Philippines) Ben Arda	282	−2	Playoff	(Japan) Hideyo Sugimoto	Singapore Island	
1966	FEC	(New Zealand) Ross Newdick	284	E	Playoff	(Taiwan) Lu Liang-Huan (Scotland) George Will	Singapore Island	
1965	FEC	(Australia) Frank Phillips (2)	279	−13	2 strokes	(Japan) Tadashi Kitta	Singapore Island	
1964	FEC	(Australia) Ted Ball	291	−1	1 stroke	(Australia) Eric Cremin (Japan) Tadashi Kitta	Singapore Island	
1963	FEC	(South Africa) Alan Brookes	276	−16	7 strokes	(Japan) Tomoo Ishii	Singapore Island	
1962	FEC	(South Africa) Brian Wilkes	283	−9	2 strokes	(Japan) Haruyoshi Kobari	Royal Singapore	
1961		(Australia) Frank Phillips	275		8 strokes	(Australia) Darrell Welch	Singapore Island	

== See also ==
- Open golf tournament
- Singapore Masters
