= 1987 Asia Golf Circuit =

Golf tour season

1987 Asia Golf Circuit season
- Duration: 19 February 1987 – 26 April 1987
- Number of official events: 10
- Most wins: (United States) Brian Tennyson (2)
- Order of Merit: (United States) Jim Hallet

The 1987 Asia Golf Circuit was the 26th season of the Asia Golf Circuit (formerly the Far East Circuit), the main professional golf tour in Asia since it was established in 1961.

== Schedule ==
The following table lists official events during the 1987 season.

Date	Tournament	Host country	Purse (US$)	Winner (Note: The number in brackets after each winner's name is the number of Asia Golf Circuit events they had won up to and including that tournament. This information is only shown for Asia Golf Circuit members.)	OWGR points	Other tours (Note: JPN − PGA of Japan Tour.)	Notes
22 Feb	San Miguel Philippine Open	Philippines	100,000	(United States) Brian Tennyson (1)	10		
1 Mar	United Airlines Hong Kong Open	Hong Kong	150,000	(Wales) Ian Woosnam (n/a)	10		
8 Mar	Benson & Hedges Malaysian Open	Malaysia	150,000	(Australia) Terry Gale (5)	10		
15 Mar	Thai International Thailand Open	Thailand	100,000	(Taiwan) Chen Tze-ming (7)	10		
22 Mar	Charminar Challenge Indian Open	India	100,000	(United States) Brian Tennyson (2)	10		
29 Mar	Singapore Open	Singapore	125,000	(Australia) Peter Fowler (1)	10		
5 Apr	Indonesia Open	Indonesia	100,000	(Australia) Wayne Smith (1)	10		
12 Apr	Taiwan Open	Taiwan	140,000	(United States) Mark Aebli (2)	10		
19 Apr	Maekyung Open	South Korea	130,000	(Taiwan) Chen Liang-hsi (1)	10		
26 Apr	Dunlop International Open	Japan	¥50,000,000	(Japan) Isao Aoki (n/a)	24	JPN	

== Order of Merit ==
The Order of Merit was based on tournament results during the season, calculated using a points-based system.

Position	Player	Points
1	(United States) Jim Hallet	806
2	(Taiwan) Chen Tze-ming	678
3	(United States) Brian Tennyson	652
4	(United States) Jeff Maggert	622
5	(Canada) Jim Rutledge	510
