= 1974 Asia Golf Circuit =

Golf tour season

1974 Asia Golf Circuit season
- Duration: 14 February 1974 – 21 April 1974
- Number of official events: 10
- Most wins: (Taiwan) Lu Liang-Huan (3)
- Order of Merit: (Taiwan) Kuo Chie-Hsiung

The 1974 Asia Golf Circuit was the 13th season of the Asia Golf Circuit (formerly the Far East Circuit), the main professional golf tour in Asia since it was established in 1961.

== Changes for 1974 ==
The circuit gained a new sponsor in 1974, General Ibnu Sutowo. Sutowi was head of the state-controlled Indonesian oil company, Pertamina, and president of the Indonesian Golf Association. In this latter role, Indonesia also joined the circuit, with the addition of the inaugural Indonesian Open expanding the schedule to ten tournaments for the first time.

== Schedule ==
The following table lists official events during the 1974 season.

Date	Tournament	Host country	Purse (US$)	Winner (Note: The number in brackets after each winner's name is the number of Asia Golf Circuit events they had won up to and including that tournament. This information is only shown for Asia Golf Circuit members.)	Other tours (Note: JPN − PGA of Japan Tour.)	Notes
17 Feb	Philippine Open	Philippines	25,000	(Taiwan) Lu Liang-Huan (4)		
24 Feb	Hong Kong Open	Hong Kong	30,000	(Taiwan) Lu Liang-Huan (5)		
3 Mar	Singapore Open	Singapore	25,000	(Philippines) Eleuterio Nival (2)		
10 Mar	Malaysian Open	Malaysia	25,000	(Australia) Graham Marsh (4)		
17 Mar	Indonesia Open	Indonesia	20,000	(Philippines) Ben Arda (5)		New tournament
24 Mar	Thailand Open	Thailand	15,000	(Japan) Toshiro Hitomi (1)		
31 Mar	Indian Open	India	15,000	(Taiwan) Kuo Chie-Hsiung (1)		
7 Apr	Taiwan Open	Taiwan	15,000	(Taiwan) Kuo Chie-Hsiung (2)		
14 Apr	Korea Open	South Korea	15,000	(South Korea) Cho Tae-woon (1)		
21 Apr	Sobu International Open	Japan	50,000	(Taiwan) Lu Liang-Huan (6)	JPN	

== Order of Merit ==
The Order of Merit was based on tournament results during the season, calculated using a points-based system.

Position	Player	Points
1	(Taiwan) Kuo Chie-Hsiung	135
2	(Taiwan) Lu Liang-Huan	122
3	(Philippines) Ben Arda	86.1
4	(Australia) Graham Marsh	86
5	(Philippines) Ireneo Legaspi	79
