= Mya Aye (golfer) =

Burmese professional golfer

Personal information
- Nationality: Burma
- Born: 1940 (age 85–86)

Career
- Sport: Golf
- Status: Professional
- Former tours: Japan Golf Tour; Asia Golf Circuit
- Professional wins: 6

Number of wins by tour
- Japan Golf Tour: 2
- Other: 4

Best results in major championships
- Masters Tournament: DNP
- PGA Championship: DNP
- U.S. Open: DNP
- The Open Championship: CUT: 1980

Mya Aye (born 1940) is a Burmese professional golfer.

== Professional career ==
Mya Aye played on the Japan Golf Tour and the Asia Golf Circuit, winning twice on each tour.

== Professional wins (6) ==
=== PGA of Japan Tour wins (2) ===
No.	Date	Tournament	Winning score	Margin of victory	Runner-up
1	21 Sep 1975	Shizuoka Open	−12 (68-69-70-69=276)	2 strokes	(Japan) Kenji Mori
2	24 Jun 1979	Pepsi-Wilson Tournament	−10 (64-70-67-73=274)	3 strokes	(Japan) Hiroshi Ishii

=== Asia Golf Circuit wins (2) ===
No.	Date	Tournament	Winning score	Margin of victory	Runner-up
1	21 Mar 1976	Indonesia Open	−12 (70-67-70-69=276)	4 strokes	(Taiwan) Kuo Chie-Hsiung
2	29 Mar 1981	Singapore Open	−11 (68-68-67-70=273)	2 strokes	(Taiwan) Lu Hsi-chuen

Asia Golf Circuit playoff record (0–3)

No.	Year	Tournament	Opponent	Result
1	1976	Malaysian Open	(Taiwan) Hsu Sheng-san	Lost to par on third extra hole
2	1976	Korea Open	(Japan) Katsunari Takahashi	Lost to par on sixth extra hole
3	1977	Indonesia Open	(United States) Gaylord Burrows	Lost to par on third extra hole

=== Other wins (2) ===
- 1979 Philippine Masters
- 1980 Gifuseki Open (Japan)

== Results in major championships ==
Tournament	1980
The Open Championship	CUT

CUT = missed the halfway cut
Note: Aye only played in The Open Championship.

== Team appearances ==
- World Cup (representing Burma): 1969, 1975, 1976, 1977, 1978, 1980

== See also ==
- 1967 PGA Tour Qualifying School graduates
