= Asia Golf Circuit =

Professional golf tour

- Formerly: Far East Circuit
- Sport: Golf
- Founded: 1961
- First season: 1962
- Folded: 1999
- Countries: Based in Asia
- Most titles: Order of Merit titles: (Taiwan) Hsieh Yung-yo (4) (Taiwan) Lu Hsi-chuen (4); Tournament wins: (Taiwan) Hsieh Yung-yo (13)
- Related competitions: Asian Tour; Ladies Asian Golf Tour

The Asia Golf Circuit was the principal men's professional golf tour in Southeast Asia from the early 1960s through to the mid-late 1990s. The tour was founded in 1961 as the Far East Circuit. The first series of five tournaments was held in 1962 and consisted of the national open championships of the Philippines, Singapore, Malaysia and Hong Kong, plus a final tournament held in Japan. The tour gradually grew over the subsequent years, eventually becoming a regular ten tournament circuit in 1974.

Leading players in the end of season standings were granted exemptions into major tournaments around the world, such as The Open Championship, the U.S. Open and the Memorial Tournament, and in later years were rewarded with playing status on the PGA of Japan Tour. Tournaments on the circuit also carried world ranking points between 1986, when the rankings were founded, and 1997.

For much of its early history the Asia Golf Circuit was dominated by players from Taiwan, Japan and Australia. The circuit became popular with young American professionals during the 1970s through into the 1990s, with future major champions Payne Stewart and Todd Hamilton having considerable success. In 1994 Asian players formed the Asian Professional Golfers Association and the following year started their own Asian PGA Tour, with twice the number of tournaments as the existing tour. Over the next few years, the national opens steadily defected to the new tour and although some replacement tournaments were added, the Asia Golf Circuit declined until it eventually ceased operating some time after 1999.

== History ==
In 1959 Hong Kong Golf Club member Kim Hall wrote to Australian professional Eric Cremin to inquire as to whether some of the Australian professionals who were travelling to play in the Philippine Open, the only major open golf tournament in Southeast Asia at the time, would consider also playing in a tournament in Hong Kong during their trip. The result was the first Hong Kong Open which was contested by 24 golfers and won by Lu Liang-Huan. The success of the Hong Kong tournament prompted the foundation of the Singapore Open in 1961, with the assistance of multiple Open Championship winner Peter Thomson, and a circuit was beginning to form. An organising committee was established in October 1961, with the first Far East Circuit being held in 1962, when the three opens were joined by the Malayan Open and the Yomiuri International in Japan. The tournaments were played over five weeks in February and March with Seagram sponsoring a circuit prize for the four players with the lowest aggregate scores. Thomson was declared the first circuit champion, with fellow Australians Kel Nagle and Frank Phillips in second and third place, and New Zealander Bob Charles in fourth.

For the second season of the Far East Circuit, an additional tournament was scheduled in Osaka, Japan but it succumbed to adverse weather, with the course being covered in four inches of snow. In 1964 an additional tournament was scheduled for the Philippines, however this time Japan were unable to host their tournament during the circuit schedule so the tour again remained at five tournaments. Expansion finally happened later in the year when Thailand joined the circuit, with the Thailand Open being added to the schedule for 1965 with prize money for all tournaments far in excess of even the flagship tournaments in Australia. The circuit continued to grow, with the addition of the China Open in Taiwan in 1966. As the circuit continued to thrive, it was decided that a body was needed to oversee the running of the tour and introduce a single set of rules and conditions across all tournaments, and in 1967 a sub-committee was set up within the Asian Golf Confederation, which had been founded in 1963 and already taken on governance of the circuit.

In 1968, India and South Korea were expected to join the confederation with the intention of adding their pre-existing national open championships to the circuit, and the tour became known as the Asian Golf Circuit. After a short delay, the Indian Open, which had been first held in 1964, and Korea Open, which was founded in 1958, were added to the circuit schedule for the first time in 1970. In 1972 the Yomiuri International was cancelled when sponsors decided to discontinue the event for political reasons; it was swiftly replaced by the Sobu International Open. The Asia Golf Circuit reached ten tournaments in 1974, with the addition of the Indonesia Open. The circuit remained at an even ten for all but a few years of its life, despite attempts to expand further. In 1978, Papua New Guinea joined the confederation, prompting a rename of the organisation to the Asia-Pacific Golf Confederation, but attempts to add a tournament to the schedule were aborted. In 1982, South Korea withdrew their national open from the circuit due to a desire to reschedule it to later in the year when the weather would be more favourable, and the Maekyung Open was founded as a replacement. The Asia Golf Circuit did finally expand to eleven tournaments when Pakistan Open was added in 1989, with the intention for it to be held in alternate years, but it proved to be only a one-off. In addition, on several occasions the circuit was effectively reduced to nine events as the Philippine Open was not counted for the Order of Merit in 1979, and removed from the circuit from 1984 through 1986.

By the late 1980s, the Asia Golf Circuit had begun to feel the effects of the expanding PGA Tour of Australia, European Tour and PGA Tour, which had also introduced a development tour, schedules, as the number of big name players arriving for tournaments started to dwindle. Then in the early 1990s, the Australian Tour began to hold tournaments in Southeast Asia, with the Malaysian Masters, Perak Masters and Singapore PGA Championship being added to their Order of Merit schedule in 1991. In 1993, the Singapore Open joined the now renamed Australasian Tour and although organisers wished to also remain on the Asia Golf Circuit, this was rejected by the Asia-Pacific Golf Confederation. Later in the year, the Australasian Tour put forward a proposal to merge the two tours, however the Asia-Pacific Golf Confederation eventually dismissed them as unfavourable and saw themselves as being in the stronger position. In 1994, the circuit had been sponsored for the first time by Newsweek International, and known as the Newsweek Asian Tour, but the agreement was terminated after just one year with much blame being placed on circuit promoters, Spectrum, and the confederation severed ties with them after just two years of a five-year deal.

Further problems for the Asia Golf Circuit soon arose as its players, who were unhappy with a lack of playing opportunities due to the limited number of tournaments and the number of overseas players on the tour, and prompted by promoter Seamus O'Brien of World Sport Group, founded the Asian PGA in 1994 with the intention of creating their own tour. The Asian PGA Tour launched in 1995 with twice the number of tournaments as the existing circuit. The Asia Golf Circuit responded by adding tournaments, including the Bali Open and Rolex Masters in early 1995, with further tournaments planned for later in the year along with the rescheduled Hong Kong Open, which was moved to November. Initially the two tours ran side by side, largely avoiding scheduling conflicts, but steadily the Asia Golf Circuit started losing tournaments to its neighbour. The Sabah Masters, which had only been on the circuit since 1994, joined the Asian PGA Tour in 1996; the Indonesian Open left in readiness for the 1997 season; Thailand, Korea and India followed suit a year later.

Although the Asia-Pacific Golf Confederation added further tournaments to the schedule, such as the Southwoods Open and Manila Open, the circuit continued to lose ground to the Asian PGA. At the end of 1997, Official World Golf Ranking points were withdrawn from the Asia Golf Circuit, and the following year the Asian PGA Tour gained further recognition when it became an affiliate member of the International Federation of PGA Tours. The remaining national opens of Hong Kong, the Philippines and Malaysia soon joined the Asian PGA Tour and although the Asia Golf Circuit still ran a six tournament schedule in 1999, this proved to be the end of the tour.

== Order of Merit winners ==
Season	Winner	Prize money (US$)
1999	(South Korea) K. J. Choi	
1997–98	(Philippines) Frankie Miñoza (2)	252,048
1996–97	(South Korea) Kim Jong-duck	156,231
1995–96	(Canada) Rick Todd	110,122
1995	(United States) Brandt Jobe	178,524
Season	Winner	Points
1994	(Paraguay) Carlos Franco	827
1993	(United States) Brian Watts	857
1992	(United States) Todd Hamilton	875
1991	(Canada) Rick Gibson	868
1990	(Philippines) Frankie Miñoza	1,006
1989	(United States) Brian Claar	882
1988	(Taiwan) Lu Chien-soon (2)	679
1987	(United States) Jim Hallet	806
1986	(Taiwan) Lu Hsi-chuen (4)	798
1985	(Taiwan) Chen Tze-ming	715
1984	(United States) John Jacobs	702
1983	(Taiwan) Lu Chien-soon	659
1982	(Taiwan) Hsu Sheng-san (3)	925
1981	(Taiwan) Lu Hsi-chuen (3)	713
1980	(Taiwan) Lu Hsi-chuen (2)	119
1979	(Taiwan) Lu Hsi-chuen	142
1978	(Taiwan) Hsu Sheng-san (2)	138
1977	(Taiwan) Hsieh Min-Nan (3)	140
1976	(Taiwan) Hsu Sheng-san	164
1975	(Taiwan) Hsieh Min-Nan (2)	140
1974	(Taiwan) Kuo Chie-Hsiung	135
1973	(Australia) Graham Marsh (2)	156
1972	(Australia) Graham Marsh	129
1971	(Taiwan) Hsieh Min-Nan	107
1970	(Philippines) Ben Arda	120
1969	(Taiwan) Hsieh Yung-yo (4)	89
1968	(Taiwan) Hsieh Yung-yo (3)	102
1967	(Taiwan) Lu Liang-Huan (2)	91
1966	(Taiwan) Lu Liang-Huan	126
1965	(Taiwan) Hsieh Yung-yo (2)	85
1964	(Taiwan) Hsieh Yung-yo	94
1963	(Australia) Kel Nagle	73
Season	Winner	Strokes
1962	(Australia) Peter Thomson	1,405

=== Multiple winners ===
Rank	Player	Wins	Years won
T1	(Taiwan) Hsieh Yung-yo	4	1964, 1965, 1968, 1969
T1	(Taiwan) Lu Hsi-chuen	4	1979, 1980, 1981, 1986
T3	(Taiwan) Hsieh Min-Nan	3	1971, 1975, 1977
T3	(Taiwan) Hsu Sheng-san	3	1976, 1978, 1982
T5	(Taiwan) Lu Chien-soon	2	1983, 1988
T5	(Taiwan) Lu Liang-Huan	2	1966, 1967
T5	(Australia) Graham Marsh	2	1972, 1973
T5	(Philippines) Frankie Miñoza	2	1990, 1997–98

== Awards ==
Season	Rookie of the Year
1997–98	(Hong Kong) Scott Rowe
1996–97	(United States) Dean Wilson
1995–96	Unknown
1995	(Sweden) Daniel Chopra
1994	Unknown
1993	Unknown
1992	Unknown
1991	(United States) Gerry Norquist
