= Golf in the Philippines =

History of Golf in the Philippines is the history of golf in the Philippines as a pastime play, as an amateur game, and as a professional sport. Golf was introduced to the Philippines more than a hundred years ago. From then onwards, the Philippines has produced its own notable "corps of golf masters" and players.

== Beginnings ==
The game of golf was introduced to the Filipinos in Manila by the British employees working for the Manila Railway Company in 1886, when the Philippines was a colony of Spain. At first, British railway workers played on a three-way golf course that they built in the paddy fields located south of Intramuros, Manila. By 1901, when the Philippines was already a territory of the United States, a nine-hole golf course adjacent to the site of the railway station became available for golfers. The nine-hole golf course paved the way to the creation of the Manila Golf Club and later the founding of the game tournament in the Philippines as the Philippine Open in 1913.

== The Philippine Open ==
The Philippine Open (also known as the National Open) was one of the oldest world competitions in the field of golf. It is also the oldest national sporting event in Asia that is related to golfing. The first Philippine Open was held in 1913 at the City of Caloocan at the former location of the Manila Golf Club. It was being held there from 1913 up to 1934. From 1913 to 1928, only non-Filipinos were allowed to participate in the Philippine Open. The Philippine open is the oldest national championship in the field of golf in Asia.

== First Filipino golf champion ==
In 1929, Larry Montes, who became skillful in golf by working as a caddie at Muni Links, became the first Filipino was allowed to play in this Philippine golf competition, under the sponsorship of a "kind-hearted" American. The identity of Montes's American sponsor had never been recorded thus his identity is unknown.

As customary during the time, any winner of the Philippine Open was entitled to be seated at his or her place presidential table while the awards dinner was being held. Montes was temporarily allowed to sit at the presidential table, but was later requested to leave from his seat during the middle of the awarding ceremony. This was because of the then existing regulation of the golf club that does not allow any caddie to enter the premises of the golf clubhouse. That situation changed when an American member of the golfclub named William "Bill" Shaw formed the Wack Wack Golf & Country Club, after being angered by what happened to Montes during his awarding ceremony in 1929. Shaw opened the doors wide to Filipinos of the Wack Wack Golf & Country Club by making that golf club "open to all races and free from any [form of] discrimination".

== Wack Wack Golf & Country Club ==
The Philippine Open was almost exclusively hosted by the Wack Wack Golf & Country Club from 1935 up to the end of the 1980s. There were a few years however, after World War II, when the Philippine Open was sometimes held at different golfing locations, such as the Holiday Hills (which was latered renamed as TAT Filipinas), at the Valley Golf Club, at the Puerto Azul and at the Villamor Golf Course. Because of this almost exclusive hosting of the Philippine Open by the Wack Wack Golf & Country Club, the Philippine Open became known also as the Wack Wack's Open.

== Asian golf tournaments in Manila ==
Under the banner of the Wack Wack's Open - the Philippine Open - the Philippines became a golfing tournament destination for notable professional golfers from Australia, the United States, South Africa, and Spain. Among those who played in Asian golf competitions that were held in Manila were Australian Norman Guy Von Nida from 1938 to 1939, American Ed "Porky" Oliver in 1949, American Lloyd Mangrum in 1951, Australians Bruce Crampton, Kel Nagle, and Peter Thomson during the 1960s and the 1970s, South African Gary Player, and Americans Doug Sanders and Sam Snead. In 1977, Spaniards Seve Ballesteros and Antonio Garrido won during that year's World Cup tournament that was held in the Philippines. The names of golfers such as Fred Couples and Kyi Hla Han also participated in the several golf tournaments that were held in the Philippines. A notable golf tournament that included Manila as a destination was the Asian Professional Tour (also known simply as the Asian Tour). A notable golf competition sponsor in Manila was the Resorts World Manila. It sponsors the Resorts World Manila Masters tournaments.

== Other notable Filipino golfers ==
=== Filipino men golfers ===
Apart from Larry Montes, there were other Filipinos who excelled in the field of golfing in the Philippines and in the Philippine Open competitions. Among them were Casiano Decena (1934), Guillermo Narvaja (1935), Celestino Tugot (1956), Ben Arda (1956), Luis "Golem" Silverio (1966), Ernesto "Moyo" Toleco (1974), Quintin Mancao (1976), Rudy Labares (1984), Mario Manubay (1986), Robert Pactolerin (1990), Frankie Miñoza (1998), Gerald Rosales (2000), Felix Casas (2001) and Juvic Pagunsan (2004). In relation to the so-called Asian Tour in golf competition, the Filipinos who became prominent were Frankie Miñoza, Angelo Que, Artemio Murakami and Juvic Pagunsan. In 2011, Pagunsan became the first Filipino golfer to win the Asian Tour Order of Merit title. The youngest Filipino to earn the so-called "Asian Tour card" was Miguel Tabuena. In the 2012 Asian Development Tour (ADT, a "feeder circuit" to the Asian Tour), Jay Baron became "most successful [golf] player". Another notable name in the Asian Development Tour and in the Aboitiz Invitational golf tournaments was Elmer Salvador.

=== Filipino women golfers ===
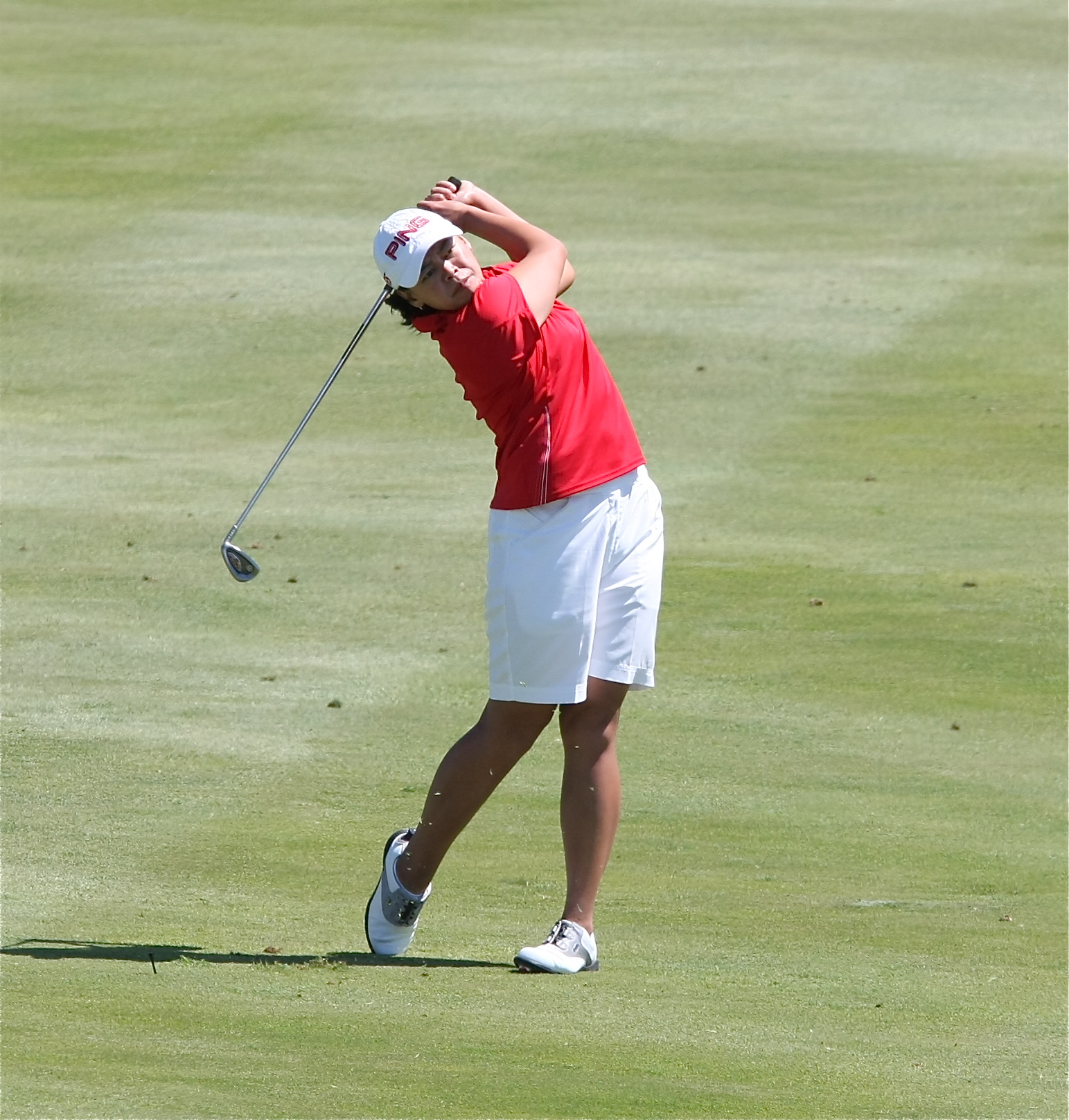
Filipino professional golfer Dorothy Delasin in 2008.

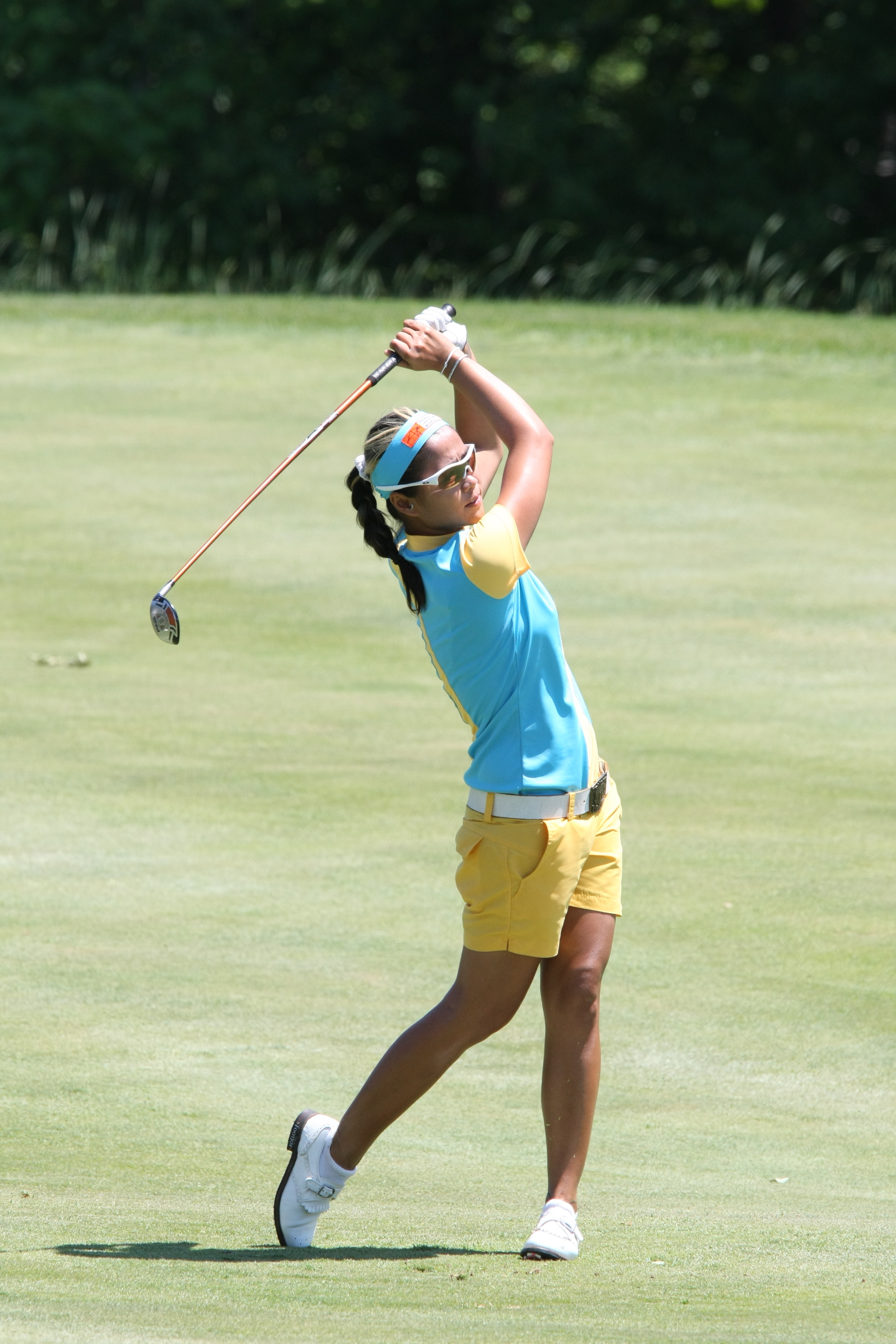
Jennifer Rosales, Filipino professional golfer, 2008.

Filipino women joined the rows and ranks of Filipino men golf-gamers in 1938. The first Filipino woman to compete in the field of golf dominated by European and American lady golfers was Dominga Capati during the 1938 Philippine Women's Open Golf Championship. Capati took some time-off as a laundrywoman to excel in golf. It was in Capati's honor that the Dominga Capati Memorial Tournament was held at the Wack Wack Golf and Country Club on March 19, 1968.

==== Women's Golf Association of the Philippines ====
An association of women golfers known as the Women's Golf Association of the Philippines (WGAP) was later established in 1971 by accomplished Filipino women golfers Edeng Feliciano, Ditas Valles, Charing Villar and Nellie Jhocson. The logo of the WGAP (an image composed of green and gold coloration) was designed by Filipino female golfer Cora Suntay. The WGAP was recognized by the Republic Golf Association of the Philippines (currently known as the National Golf Association of the Philippines) and had been responsible for competitions known collectively as the "WGAP Circuit" of tournaments. The first among the WGAP Circuit competitions was the Philippine Ladies Open tournament. The WGAP, through its then president Gina Tuason, later held the 1993 Luzon, Visayas, and Mindanao Tournament (abbreviated as LuzViMin Tournament; Luzon, Visayas and Mindanao are the three main islands of the Philippine archipelago) with the goal of unifying the country and the nation's female golfers. In 2000, the Women's Golf Association of the Philippines held the WGAP Cup "match-play" tournament.

== National Golf Association of the Philippines ==
During the 1990s, the National Golf Association of the Philippines (NGAP) became the national sports body for gold that organizes the Philippine Open. Taking over from the Wack Wack Golf & Country Club, the NGAP held the Philippine Open in other golf courses in the Philippines, such as golfing locations in Camp John Hay in Baguio, in the Apo Golf Club in Davao in Mindanao, in the Riviera in Cavite in Luzon, and in the Manila Southwoods Golf and Country Club. By the end of the 1990s, the Asian Professional Tour was replaced by the Asia PGA Tour (also became known as Asian Tour, the nickname of its predecessor).

== See also ==
- List of golf courses in the Philippines
