= List of golf courses in the Philippines =

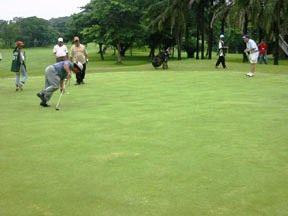
A golf course in San Jose del Monte, Bulacan.

This is a list of golf courses in the Philippines.

== Luzon ==
=== Metro Manila ===
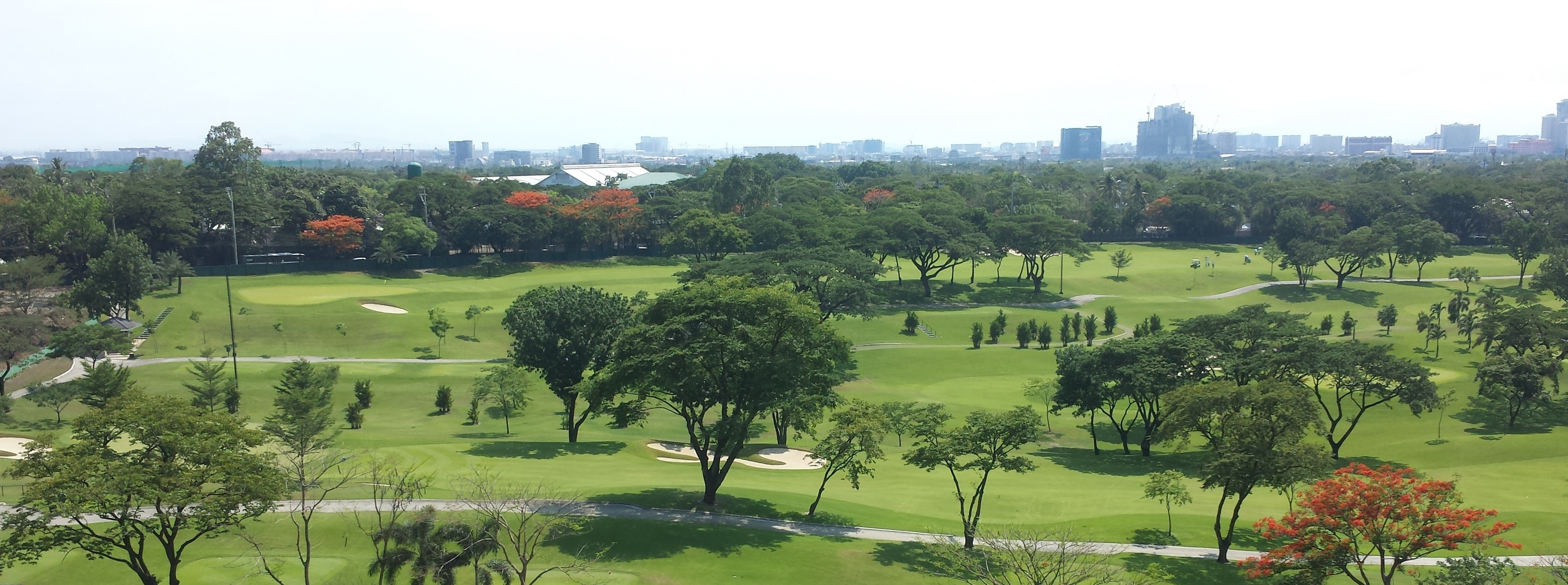
Manila Golf & Country Club

==== Las Piñas ====
- Southlinks Golf Club (no longer operational)

Almanza Dos

==== Makati ====
- Manila Golf and Country Club

Forbes Park

==== Mandaluyong ====
- Wack Wack Golf and Country Club

==== Manila ====
- Club Intramuros Golf Course

Intramuros, Manila

- Malacañang Golf Club

Paco, Manila

==== Muntinlupa ====
- Alabang Country Club

Ayala Alabang Village, Muntinlupa

==== Pasay ====
- Villamor Air Base Golf Club

==== Quezon City ====
- Camp Aguinaldo Golf Club
- Capitol Hills Golf & Country Club (not operational)
- Veterans Golf Course

==== Taguig ====
- Philippine Navy Golf Club
- Philippine Army Golf Club (Kagitingan)

=== Benguet ===
- Baguio Country Club

Camp John Hay, Baguio

- Camp John Hay Golf Club

Camp John Hay, Baguio

- Pinewoods Golf and Country Club

Baguio

- Lepanto Golf Club

Mankayan

=== Batangas ===
- Calatagan Golf Club

Calatagan

- Canyon Woods Resort Club (9 holes)

Laurel, (along Tagaytay Ridge)

- KC Hillcrest (No longer operational) (formerly known as Evercrest Golf Club and Resort)

Kilometer 72, Batulao, Nasugbu

- Mount Malarayat Golf & Country Club (27 hole, Makulot, Lobo, and Malipunyo nines)

Lipa

- Club Punta Fuego (9 holes)

Barangay Balaytigue, Nasagbu

- Summit Point Golf & Country Club

Lipa

- Fernando Airbase Golf Club

Lipa

- Splendido Taal Golf Club

Laurel

- Tagaytay Midlands :Talisay (27 holes)

=== Bulacan ===
- Royal Northwoods Golf & Country Club

Coral na Bato, San Rafael

- Cattle Creek Golf Club

Sapang Palay, San Jose del Monte

=== Bicol Region ===
- Pili Grove Golf Club :Pili, Camarines Sur
- Apuao Grande Island Golf Course (known as the Swagman Golf Club)

Mercedes, Daet

- Doña Pepita Golf Course

Santo Domingo, Albay

- Haciendas de Naga

Naga

=== Cavite ===
- Eagle Ridge Golf & Country Club (72 holes, Aoki, Norman, Dye and Faldo courses.)

Barangay Javalera, Gen. Trias

- Manila Southwoods Golf & Country Club (36 holes, Masters and Legends courses)

1 Southwoods Avenue, Cabilang Baybay, Carmona

- Zamora Championship Course at Puerto Azul

Barangay Sapang, Ternate

- Riviera Golf and Country Club (36 holes, Langer and Couples courses)

along Aguinaldo Highway in Silang near Tagaytay

- Riviera Sports and Country Club (9 hole par-3 course)

Silang

- Royale Tagaytay Country Club, 9 hole course

E. Aguinaldo Highway, Upli Alfonso

- Sherwood Hills Golf Club

Brgy. Cabezas and Lailana, Trece Martires

- South Forbes Golf Club

Brgy. Inchican, Silang Cavite

- Tagaytay Highlands

Tagaytay Highlands, Tagaytay

- The Orchard Golf & Country Club (36 holes, Palmer and Player courses)

Km 27 E. Aguilnado Highway, Dasmariñas

=== Ilocos Norte ===
- Fort Ilocandia Resort Hotel (status uncertain)

Calayab, Laoag

=== La Union ===
- The Cliffs Golf and Beach Club

San Fernando, La Union

=== Laguna ===
- Caliraya Springs Golf & Country Club (36 holes)

Cavinti, Laguna

- Canlubang Golf & Country Club (36 holes, North and South courses)

Canlubang

- Canlubang Sugar Estate, also known as Old Canlubang, 9 holes

Canlubang

- Sta. Elena Golf Club (27 holes)

Malitlit, Santa Rosa

- The Country Club

Malitlit, Santa Rosa

- Filipinas Golf Hallow Ridge. (formerly KC Filipinas, TAT Filipinas Golf Club and the Holiday Hills Golf & Country Club)

San Pedro

- Ayala Greenfield Golf Course

Ayala Greenfield Estates, Calamba

=== Mindoro ===
- Ponderosa Golf Club

Puerto Galera

=== Marinduque ===
- Fantasy Elephant Club

Barangay Lipata, Buenavista

- Marcopper Golf Course (status uncertain)

Sta. Cruz

=== Palawan ===
- Puerto Princesa Golf Club/ Western Front Golf Course

Puerto Princesa

- Rio Tuba Nickel Mining Corporation Golf Course/Mt. Bulanjao Golf Course :Rio Tuba

=== Olongapo ===
- Subic International Golf Club

=== Pampanga ===
- MPLI (Malabon Property Landholdings Inc.) formerly Angeles Sports & Country Club
- Clark Sun Valley Country Club (36 holes)

Clark Freeport Zone

- Mimosa Golf & Country Club (36 holes, the Mountainview and Acacia-Lakeview courses)

Clark Freeport Zone

- Fontana Leisure Parks And Casino (not operational)

Clark Freeport Zone

- Marina Hills Golf Course (not operational)

Mabalacat

- Royal Garden Golf Club (undergoing rehabilitation, currently closed)

Friendship Hwy, Angeles

- FA Korea Country Club (36 holes, Upper and Lower courses)

Clark Freeport Zone

- Pradera Verde Golf Club, Lubao, Pampanga. (27 holes)
- Beverly Place Golf Club, Mexico, Pampanga.
- Basa Air Base Golf Club, Floridablanca (9 holes)

=== Pangasinan ===
- Dagupan Golf and Beach Club

San Fabian - Bonuan - Dagupan Diversion Road, Bonuan

=== Rizal ===
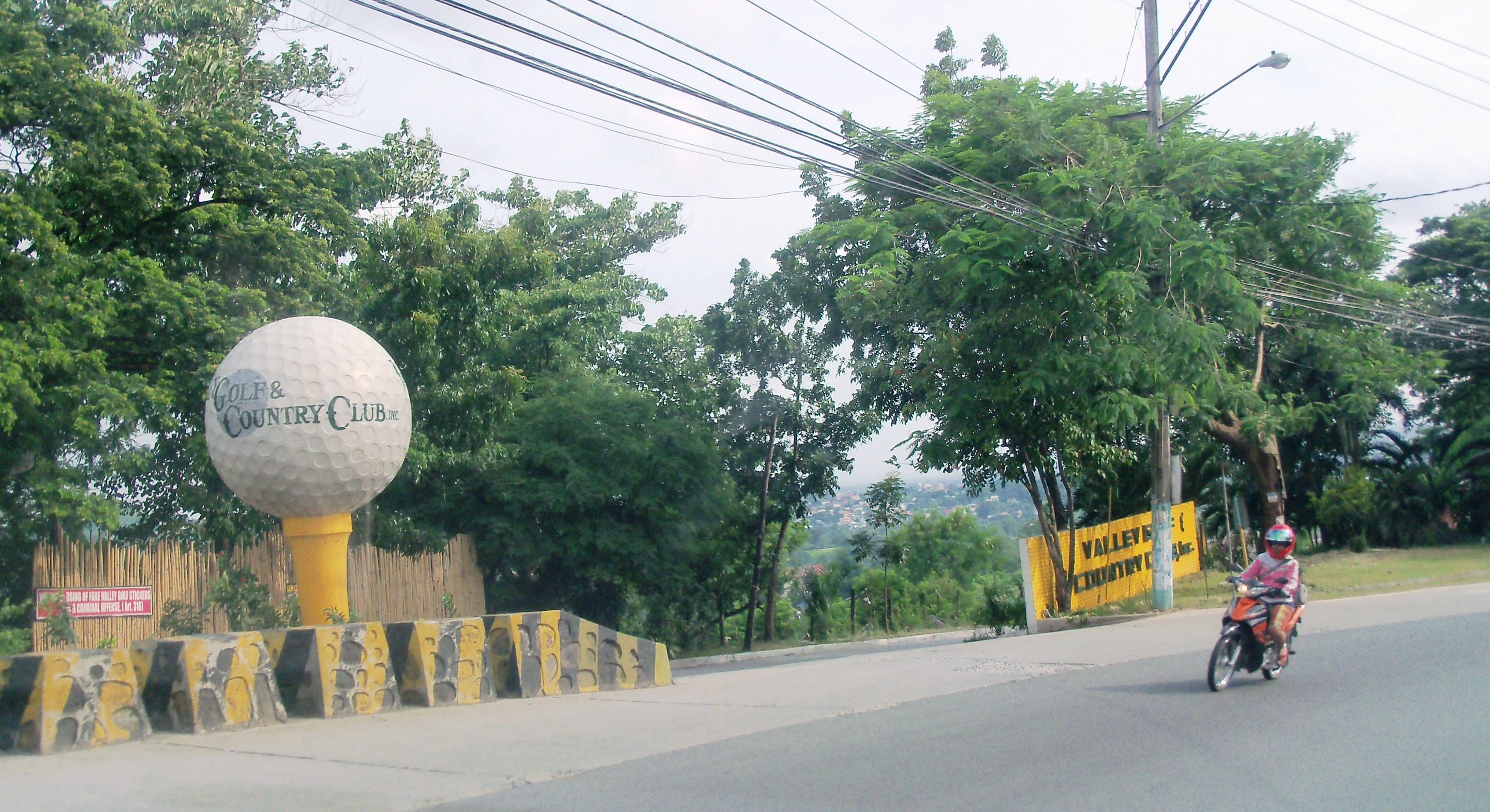
Entrance to the Valley Golf and Country Club.

- Eastridge Golf Club

Bo. Bilibiran, Binangonan

- Forest Hills Golf & Country Club (36 holes, Nicklaus and Palmer courses.)

Brgy. Inarawan San Isidro Cogeo Antipolo

- Valley Golf and Country Club (36 holes, North and South courses)

Don Celso S. Tuason Avenue, Antipolo

- Sun Valley Golf & Country Club

Antipolo

- Camp Capinpin Golf Course :Camp Capinpin Army Base, Tanay (9 holes, limited access to the public)

=== Tarlac ===
- Luisita Golf and Country Club

Hacienda Luisita, San Miguel

- Camp Servillano Aquino Golf Club

Camp Aquino, San Miguel

- New Asia Golf Resort and Spa

O'Donnell, Capas

- Sky Blue Golf Course and Resort (under construction)

Maruglu, Capas

=== Bataan ===
- Anvaya Cove Golf & Country Club

Morong

- Peninsula Golf Club / Petron Bataan Golf Course

Limay (status uncertain)

- Camaya Coast

Mariveles

=== Nueva Ecija ===
- Lakewood Golf and Country Club, Inc.

Sumacab Este, Cabanatuan

=== Isabela ===
- Isabela Golf Club

Ilagan

- Perfect Star Golf Course, formerly UPI Hills Golf & Country Club

Gamu

=== Zambales ===
- National Education and Training Command (NEDTC) Golf and Recreational Facility

Naval Station Leovigildo Gantioqui, San Miguel

== Visayas ==
=== Bacolod ===
- Bacolod Golf & Country

Hacienda Binitin, Murcia

- Negros Occidental Golf & Country Club

Bata Subdivision, Bacolod

- Victorias Golf Club

Victorias City Negros Occidental,

=== Boracay ===
- Fairways and Bluewater Golf & Country Club

Newcoast, Balabag, Boracay Island, Aklan

=== Cebu ===
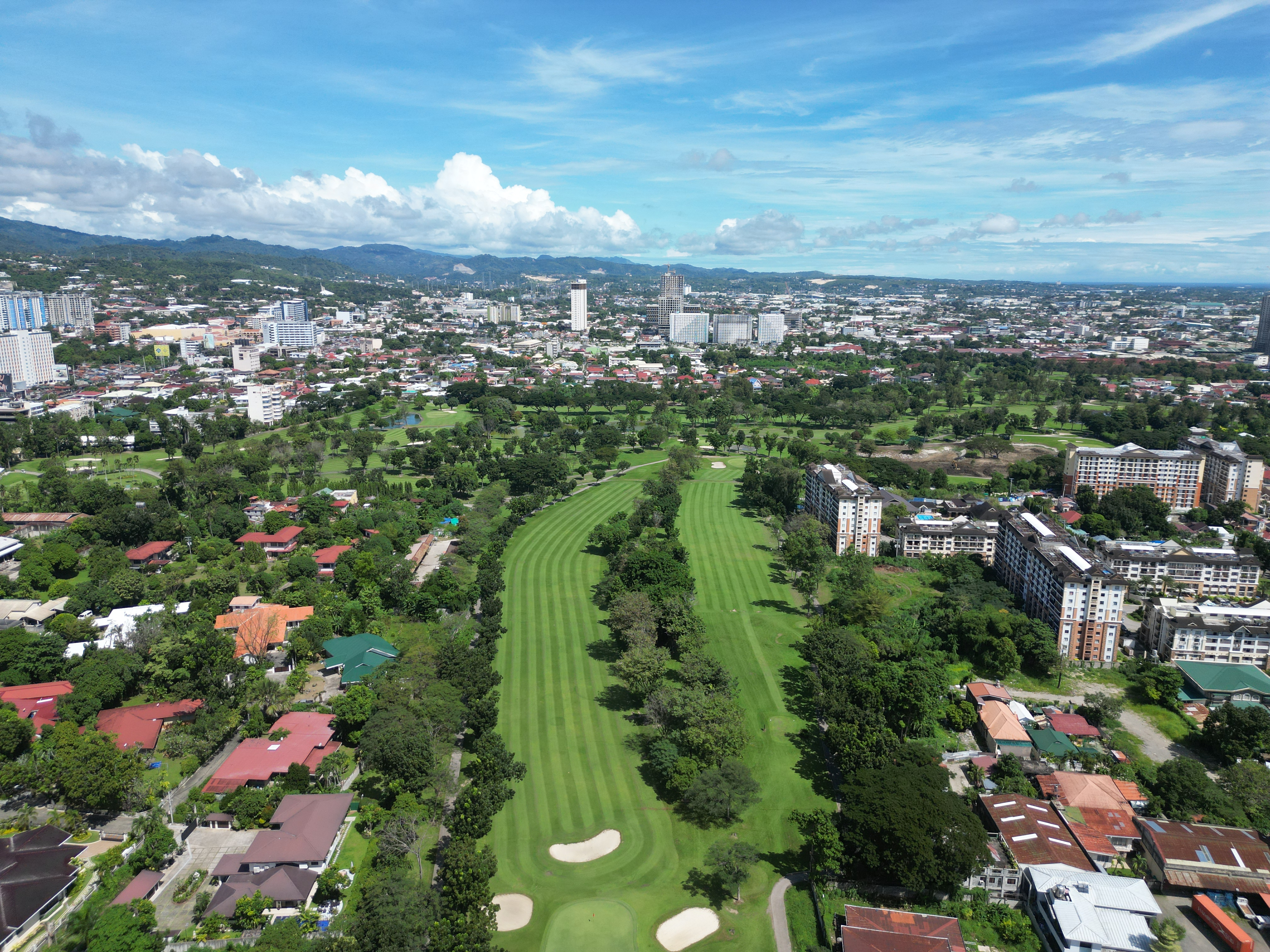
Cebu Country Club

- Alta Vista Golf & Country Club

Aznar Road, Pardo Hills, Cebu City

- Cebu Country Club

Gov. M Cuenco, Banilad, Cebu City

- Cebu International Golf and Resort (not operational at the moment)

Barangay Lambug, Badian, Cebu

- Green Island Golf & Beach Resort

Barangay Lambug, Badian

- Verdemar Golf

203 GCA Bldg., 13 Banilad Rd, Banilad, San Remigio

- Club Filipino de Cebu

Danao, Cebu

- Queens Island Golf Club

Medellin Nr. Cebu Island

- Mercedes Golf Club

Medellin Nr.Cebu Island.

- Liloan Golf Course and Leisure Estates

Liloan, Cebu

- Mactan Island Golf Club

Mactan-Benito Ebuen Airbase, Lapulapu City

=== Iloilo ===
- Iloilo Golf and Country Club (known as Sta. Barbara)

Sta. Barbara, Iloilo
The Iloilo Golf and Country Club, Inc. is the home of the Sta. Barbara Golf Course, the oldest existing golf course in Southeast Asia (est. 1907). It has a challenging 18-hole golf course (6,056 yards) carved into the hills of Sta. Barbara, Iloilo.

=== Leyte ===
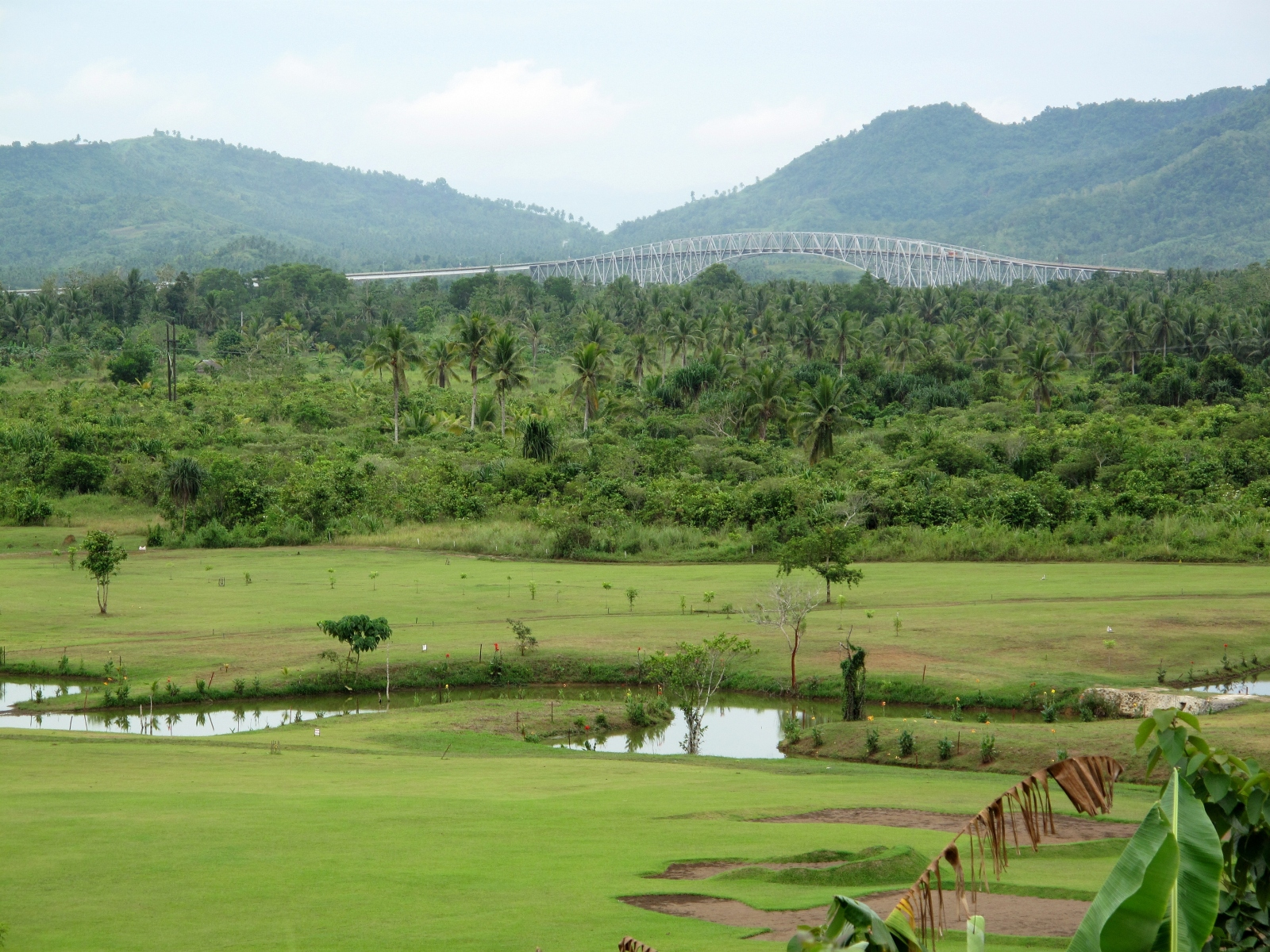
San Juanico Golf Course

- San Juanico Golf Course and Hotel

Cabalawan, Tacloban

- Ormoc City Golf Course

Ormoc City, Leyte

=== Negros Oriental ===
- Ang Tay Golf Club (9 holes)

Dumaguete

- Negros International Golf and Country Club (newly renovated and reopened)

Tanjay-Sta.Catalina Rd, Pamplona, Negros Oriental

- Bravo Hotel & Golf

Sibulan, 6201 Negros Oriental

== Mindanao ==
=== Agusan del Norte ===
- West Highlands Golf Club

=== Lanao del Sur ===
- MSU Kalilang Golf and Country Club :Marawi City

=== Cagayan de Oro ===
- Pueblo de Oro Golf & Country Club

Pueblo Golf Estates

- Camp Evangelista Golf Club

=== Maguindanao ===
- Illana Bay Golf Club

Camp Gen S.K. Pendatun, Parang

=== Misamis Occidental ===
- Mt. Malindang Golf Course : Ozamiz

=== Bukidnon ===
- Del Monte Golf Course & Country Club

Manolo Fortich

=== Iligan ===
- Golf and Country Club of Iligan, Inc.

=== Davao ===
- Apo Golf & Country Club

Barangay Bago, Davao City

- Rancho Palos Verdes

Barangay Mandug (Buhangin District)

- South Pacific Golf Club and Residential Estates

Talomo, Davao City, Davao del Sur.

- Don Paco Rocamora Golf and Country Club

Dahican, Mati

=== South Cotabato ===
- Brittannika Golf Club :Tupi, South Cotabato
- Dole Kalsangi Golf Club : Polomolok
- Paraiso Golf Course : Koronadal

=== Zamboanga ===
- Zamboanga Golf and Country Club

Zamboanga City

- Edwin Andrews Air Base Golf & Country Club

Zamboanga City

=== Zamboanga del Norte ===
- Dakak Golf Club :Dapitan

=== Sarangani ===
- Sarangani Golf & Country Club

Malungon
