= Philippine Golf Championship =

Tournament information
- Location: Mandaluyong, Metro Manila, Philippines
- Established: 2026
- Course: Wack Wack Golf and Country Club
- Par: 72
- Length: 7,188 yards (6,573 m)
- Tour: Asian Tour
- Format: Stroke play
- Prize fund: US$500,000
- Month played: February

Tournament record score
- Aggregate: 277 Cho Woo-young (2026)
- To par: −11 as above

Current champion
- (South Korea) Cho Woo-young

Location map
- Location in the Philippines

The Philippine Golf Championship is a professional golf tournament in the Philippines, played on the Asian Tour.

== Background ==
Initially named as the Philippine President's Cup, the tournament was organized by the Philippine Sports Commission (PSC) and the National Golf Association of the Philippines.

The tournament was conceptualized after the successful hosting of the International Series Philippines during the 2025 Asian Tour season. The tournament was later named as the Philippine Golf Championship.

The inaugural event is part of the 2026 Asian Tour, held from 5 to 8 February 2026 at the Wack Wack Golf and Country Club in Mandaluyong.

== Winners ==
Year	Winner	Score	To par	Margin of victory	Runner-up	Ref.
2026	(South Korea) Cho Woo-young	277	−11	4 strokes	(Thailand) Pavit Tangkamolprasert	
