= Golf in India =

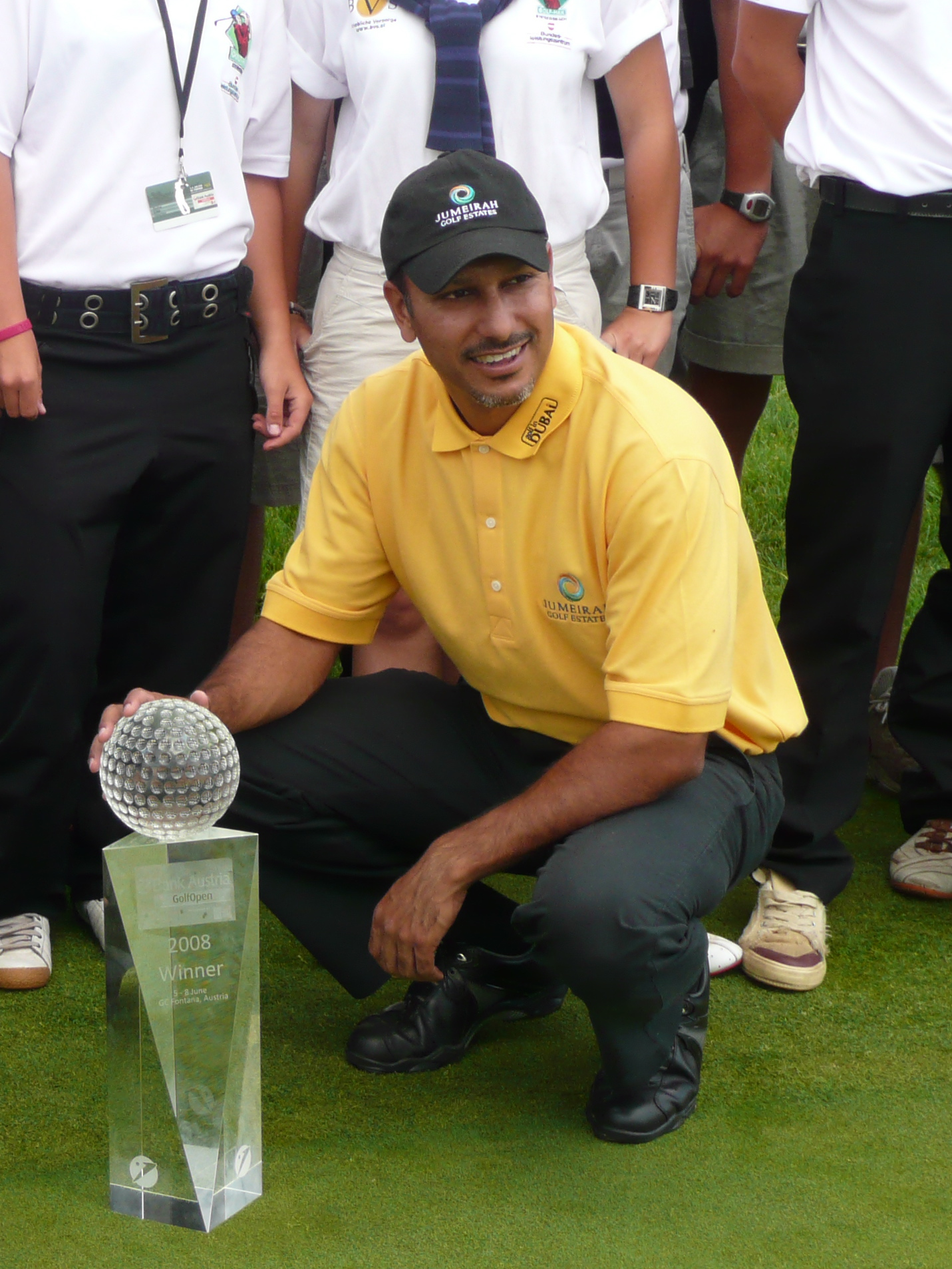
- Indian professional golfer Jeev Milkha Singh after winning the 2008 Austrian Open.
- Governing body: Indian Golf Union
- First played: 1829
- Registered players: 215

National competitions
- Amateur Golf Championship of India; All India Ladies Amateur Championship; All India Seniors Golf Championship; All India Junior Golf Championship

Club competitions
- Indian Golf Premier League (2025–present)

International competitions
- Indian Open

Golf in India is a growing sport. Golf is especially popular among the wealthier classes, but has not yet caught on with others due to the expenses involved in playing.

The most successful Indian golfers are Jeev Milkha Singh, Raminder Sidhu who is a Top Golf star and Anirban Lahiri. Singh has won three titles on the European Tour, four on the Japan Golf Tour, and six on the Asian Tour. His highest world ranking to date is 28th, achieved in March 2009. Singh has won the Asian Tour Order of Merit twice. Meanwhile, Lahiri has two European Tour wins and seven Asian Tour wins. He qualified for the 2015 Presidents Cup.

Other Indians who have won the Asian Tour Order of Merit are Jyoti Randhawa in 2002 (the first Indian to achieve this) and Arjun Atwal, who went on in 2010 to become the first India-born player to become a member of the US-based PGA Tour and win the 2010 Wyndham Championship.

India's men's team won gold at the 1982 Asian Games. They also won silver at the 2006 Asian Games and 2010 Asian Games. Lakshman Singh won the individual gold medal at the 1982 Asian Games. Shiv Kapur won the individual gold medal at the 2006 Asian Games.

There are numerous golf courses all over India. There is a Professional Golf Tour of India. The main tournament is the Hero Indian Open, co-sanctioned by the Asian Tour and European Tour.

In addition to the commendable performances by the golf players of India, the Indian Golf Union (IGU) is making earnest efforts to improve the standard of the game in the country. Established in 1955, IGU made a significant decision in 1995, which gave rise to the birth of a separate body for the sport - Professional Golfers' Association of India (PGAI). Recent development in Indian golf is commencement of Indian Pitch and Putt Association, apex body of Pitch and Putt Golf in India, and membership of Federation of International Pitch and Putt Associations. The Indian Golf Union (IGU) and HVR Sports have come out with new schemes to grow the sport in India.

== Total medals won by Indian Golfers in Major tournaments ==
Competition	Gold	Silver	Bronze	Total
Asian Games	3	4	0	7
Total	3	4	0	7

- updated till 31st July, 2024

== Notable Performance at Summer Olympics ==
Year	Event	Player	Result
2020
2020	Women's individual	Aditi Ashok	4th

=== List of National Sports award recipients in Golf, showing the year, award, and gender ===
Year	Recipient	Award	Gender
1961	P. G. Sethi	Arjuna Award	Male
1963	Ashok Malik	Arjuna Award	Male
1967	Raj Kumar Pitambar	Arjuna Award	Male
1972	Anjani N. Desai	Arjuna Award	Female
1973	Vikramjit Singh	Arjuna Award	Male
1975	S. K. Jamshed	Arjuna Award	Male
1977–1978	Sita Rawlley	Arjuna Award	Female
1982	Lakshman Singh	Arjuna Award	Male
1987	Nonita Lal	Arjuna Award	Female
1991	Ali Sher	Arjuna Award	Male
1996	Amit Luthra	Arjuna Award	Male
1997	Harmik Kahlon	Arjuna Award	Male
1999	Jeev Milkha Singh	Arjuna Award	Male
2002	Shiv Kapur	Arjuna Award	Male
2004	Jyoti Randhawa	Arjuna Award	Male
2007	Arjun Atwal	Arjuna Award	Male
2013	Gaganjeet Bhullar	Arjuna Award	Male
2014	Anirban Lahiri	Arjuna Award	Male
2017	Shiv Chawrasia	Arjuna Award	Male
2018	Shubhankar Sharma	Arjuna Award	Male
2020	Aditi Ashok	Arjuna Award	Female

== Golf Associations in India ==
=== Governing bodies of Sport ===
1. Indian Golf Union, apex body of Golf affiliated to International Golf Federation
2. Professional Golf Tour of India, the controlling body for professional golf in India
3. Women's Golf Association of India, women's professional golf organisation of India
4. Professional Golfers’ Association (PGA) of India, a body involved in educating and training its members to the highest level who are involved in the various aspects of the game for its overall development.
5. Indian Pitch and Putt association, the governing body of Pitch and Putt Golf in India member of Federation of International Pitch and Putt Associations
6. Paralympic Golf Association of India, organisation for golfers with disabilities in India
7. India Golf Tourism Association, organisation for golf tourism in India

=== Golf Industry Association ===
1. Asia Golf Industry Show Hosted by CII
2. Golf Industry Association, the industry group to develop and support different industries of golf and allied business
3. Golf Course Superintendents & Managers Association of India, their objective is to assist all golf course developers, owners, and entrepreneurs running golf courses.

=== Leading Golf Event Organisers ===
1. Romitbosegolf
2. My Golf Tours
3. Can and able entertainment
4. Premier Lifestyle Event Management
5. India Golf Tours
6. Sports & Leisure Worldwide
7. Brandon de Souza Management Services
8. MYT Sports & Adventures Marketing Pvt Ltd
9. Ace Golf
10. Professional Management Group
11. Rishi Narain Golf Management
12. Dehradun Golf Academy
13. K&A Golf
14. The Khyber Golf Cup by

== Major Golf Tournaments in India ==
2014 season on the professional tour had 24 tournaments. SAIL-SBI Open, and the Panasonic Open were co-sanctioned by the Asian Tour and the Take Solutions India Masters was co-sanctioned by the Asian Development Tour. BILT Open, CG Open, Louis Philippe Cup, TATA Open and the Mcleod Russel Tour Championship were the ones with the highest Prize monies. The 2015 Hero Indian Open is co-sanctioned by the Asian Tour and the European Tour.

The Expat Cup, The Bonallack Trophy, SAIL Open, DLF Women's Indian Open, The India Golf Festival, Corporate Team Challenge, Kashmir Golf Festival, Take Solutions World Corporate Golf Challenge, The Toyota Golf Festival, Mercedes Trophy, Citibank World Golfers Championship, ICICI Bank Private Banking Masters, The ICICI Bank International Pro-Am, The British Airways Executive Challenge, The World NRI Challenge, Barclays Invitational,

== Golf infrastructure in India ==
India currently has 196 registered golf courses and around 50% of those registered courses are situated on military bases, which are only accessible to military. 35 additional courses are un-affiliated (approx 17 Pitch and Putt Courses). This leaves roughly 135 courses to cater for a civilian golf demand.

The makeup of the golf course supply is split between 18-hole (39% share) and 9-hole (60% share) facilities, with three 27-hole clubs. Research collected for KPMG's Golf Benchmark Survey indicates that the average number of rounds played per annum at 18-hole facilities ranges from 25,000 to 30,000 (excluding military courses). At some of the busier clubs where floodlights are used, hours can be extended to accommodate a higher demand.

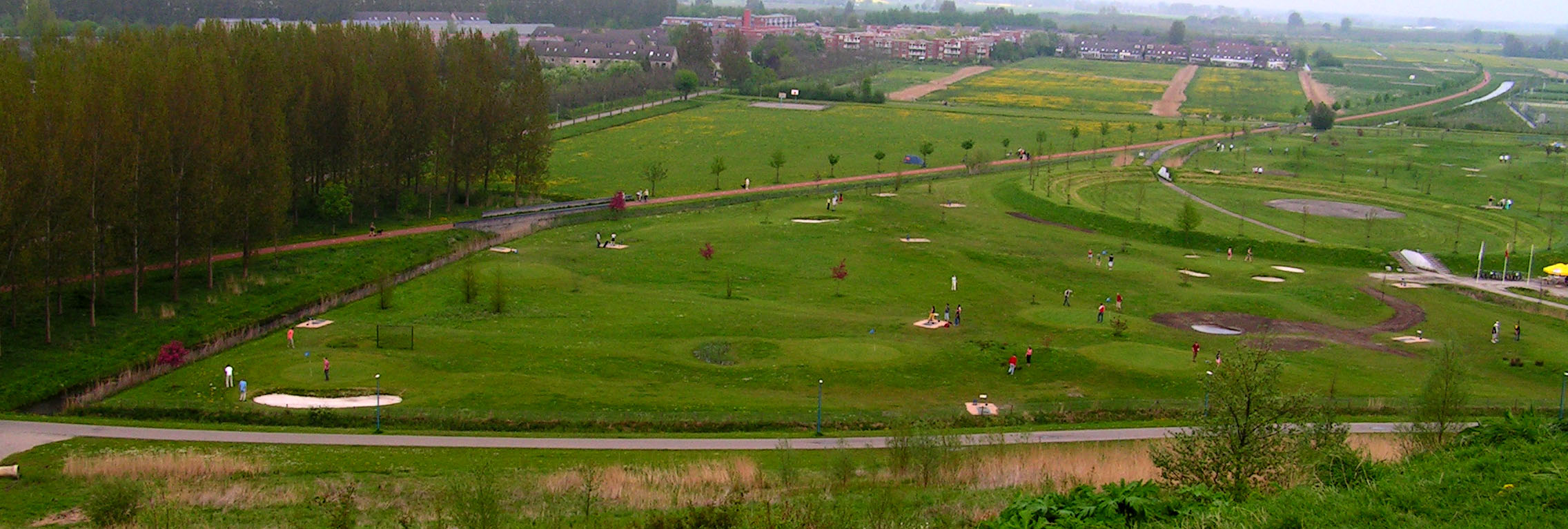
Pitch and putt; suitable for Urban India

Average annual revenues for both 9- and 18-hole courses range US$180,000–200,000 (excluding military courses) with some larger, more popular clubs reaching anywhere up to $800,000 per year.

Another major challenge India faces today in developing golf courses is the inability to acquire land in both a cost- and time-efficient manner. Land parcels are generally small, and developers need to purchase multiple plots at a cost that can quickly inflate. The initial steps taken when planning a project with a golf component can be time-consuming, expensive and misunderstood, delaying developments and have, in some instances, resulted in the omission of golf from project master plans.
