= Charlie Lindh =

Swedish professional golfer (born 1997)

Personal information
- Full name: Sven Anders Charlie Lindh
- Nationality: Sweden
- Born: 1 August 1997 (age 29) Kristianstad, Sweden

Career
- Sport: Golf
- Turned professional: 2018
- Current tour: Asian Tour
- Former tours: Challenge Tour; Nordic Golf League
- Professional wins: 4

Number of wins by tour
- Asian Tour: 1
- Other: 3

Best results in major championships
- Masters Tournament: DNP
- PGA Championship: DNP
- U.S. Open: DNP
- The Open Championship: CUT: 2024

Achievements and awards
- PGA of Sweden Future Fund Award: 2024

Charlie Lindh (born 1 August 1997) is a Swedish professional golfer who plays on the Asian Tour. In 2026, he won the Am Green IGPL Bharath Classic and was runner-up at the Korea Open.

== Early life ==
Lindh was raised in Färlöv in Kristianstad Municipality, and started playing golf at the age of 12 in 2009 when Araslöv Golf Club built a second 18-hole course next to his family home.

== Professional career ==
Lindh turned professional in 2018 and joined the Nordic Golf League. In 2019, he tied for 3rd at the Bravo Tours Open in Denmark and finished solo 3rd at the Swedish PGA Championship, where he lost out on joining the playoff by a stroke. In 2020, he was runner-up at the Stockholm Trophy behind Mikael Lindberg, and in 2021 he was solo 2nd at the MoreGolf Mastercard Tour Final. In 2022, he was runner-up at the Junet Open at Sand Golf Club. After having won the First Stage in Austria, Lindh had to drop out of European Tour Qualifying School in late 2022 as he fell off a horse and broke a clavicle.

In 2023, Lindh won three tournaments on the Nordic Golf League, one in Poland and two in Denmark, to earn battlefield promotion to the Challenge Tour. He made nine Challenge Tour starts in 2023 and finished top-5 at the Copenhagen Challenge and Indoor Golf Group Challenge.

=== Asian Tour ===
In January 2024, Lindh finished 6th at the Asian Tour Q-School in Cha-Am, Thailand, and earned a card for the 2024 season. He finished his rookie season 44th in the Order of Merit, with a best finish of tied 7th at the International Series Thailand, where he was co-leader after a bogey-free first round of 63.

Lindh qualified for his first major championship, the 2024 Open Championship at Royal Troon Golf Club in Scotland, through final qualifying at Burnham & Berrow Golf Club, after prevailing in a playoff against Abraham Ancer and Anirban Lahiri for third and fourth place.

Lindh started 2025 with top-10 finishes at International Series India and International Series Macau, and later tied for 3rd at the Taiwan Glass Taifong Open. He lost a playoff at the Swedish PGA Championship to Anton Karlsson.

In 2026, he finished tied 6th at the New Zealand Open and was runner-up at the Korea Open, before capturing his first Asian Tour title at the Am Green IGPL Bharath Classic in Morocco.

== Professional wins (4) ==
=== Asian Tour wins (1) ===
No.	Date	Tournament	Winning score	Margin of victory	Runners-up
1	7 Jun 2026	Am Green IGPL Bharath Classic^{1}	−18 (69-70-67-64=270)	4 strokes	(United States) Charles Porter, (Thailand) Settee Prakongvech

^{1}Co-sanctioned by the Indian Golf Premier League

=== Nordic Golf League wins (3) ===
No.	Date	Tournament	Winning score	Margin of victory	Runner-up
1	15 Apr 2023	Gebwell Championship	−14 (66-67-69=202)	3 strokes	(Iceland) Axel Bóasson
2	28 Apr 2023	Bravo Tours Open	−4 (67-74-71=212)	2 strokes	(Denmark) Alexander George Frances
3	6 Oct 2023	Aarhus Alliance	−12 (67-67-70=204)	2 strokes	(Denmark) Frederik Severin Tøttenborg (a)

== Results in major championships ==
Tournament	2024
Masters Tournament	
PGA Championship	
U.S. Open	
The Open Championship	CUT

Did not play

CUT = missed the half-way cut
