= Luisita =

Luisita is a diminutive for the given name Luisa. It may refer to:

== People ==
- Luisita Cruz-Valdes (born 1965), Filipino broadcast journalist
- Luisita Leers (Martha Luise Krökel; 1909 – 1997) German strongwoman
- Luisita López Torregrosa (born 1943), Puerto Rican journalist, book author, editor, freelance writer, and professor
- Luisita Tenor (1941–2020), Spanish pop singer
- Mother Luisita, or María Luisa Josefa (1866–1937), Mexican Roman Catholic nun

== Places ==
- Hacienda Luisita, sugar plantation in Philippines
- Luisita Golf and Country Club, Philippines
- Former name of Mapalacsiao, Philippines
