= Manila Golf and Country Club =

Golf course in Makati, Philippines

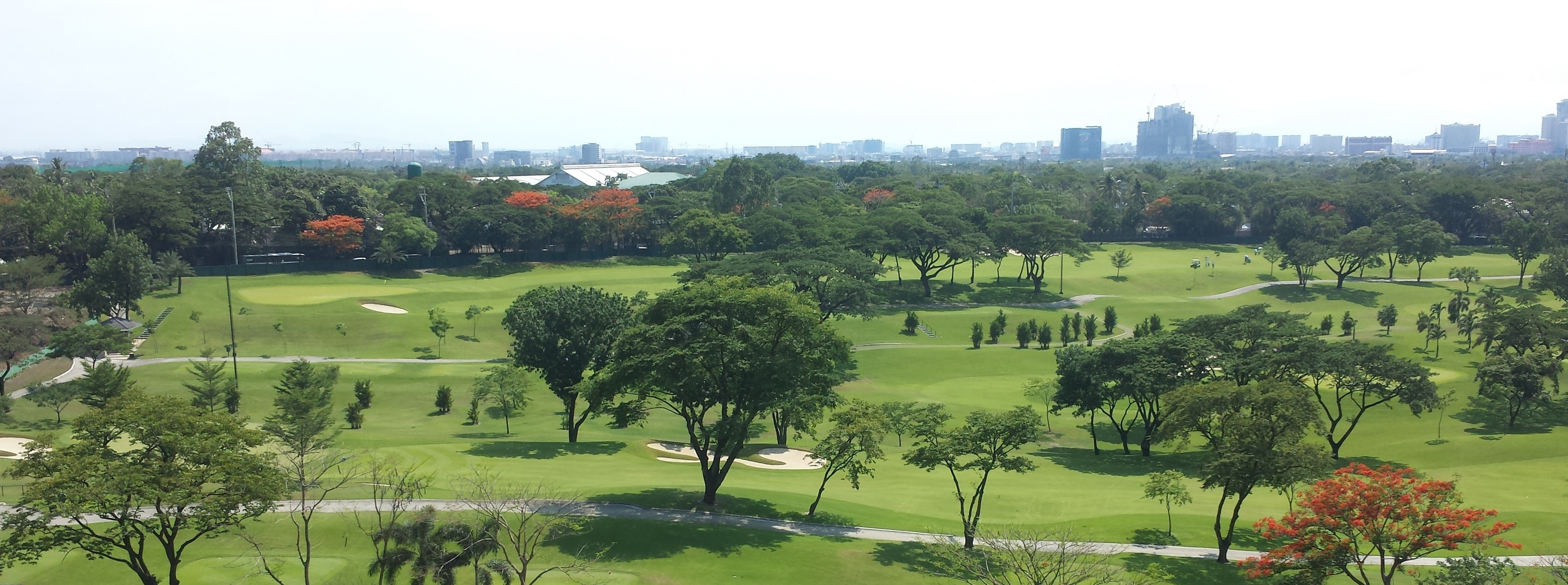
- Interactive map of Manila Golf and Country Club
- 14°33′00.1″N 121°02′29.2″E

Club information
- Location: Forbes Park, Makati, Philippines
- Established: 1949
- Owner: Manila Golf and Country Club, Inc.
- Tota holes: 18

The Manila Golf and Country Club is a golf course and country club in Makati, Metro Manila, Philippines.

== History ==
=== Early years ===
The precursor of the Manila Golf and Country Club (MGCC) is the Manila Golf Club (MGC) which was formed by a group of Englishmen which built a seven-hole golf course in Pasay (at the site later occupied by the Manila Polo Club). They have organized themselves of a "golf club of some sort" by 1902.

In 1906, a new nine-hole course was built in Caloocan to accommodate the MGC's growing membership. In 1909, the land where the golf club stands was purchased and MGC was incorporated. The MGC organized the Club Championship which was the de facto top golf tournament in the Philippine islands until the organization of the Philippine Open in 1913 which the club sponsored in its early years. The MGC was an exclusive club where Filipino natives were discriminated.

Native Filipino caddie Larry Montes' win in the 1929 Open hosted at the Caloocan course and the subsequent racism he experienced led to the establishment of MGC's rival club Wack Wack Golf and Country Club in Mandaluyong by former MGC member William James Shaw.

=== Move to Makati ===
MGC moved its golf course to Makati in 1949 upon the urging of the Ayala family. The MGCC was created in October 1959 through the merger of MGC and Country Club Development Inc.

== Facilities ==
The Manila Golf and Country Club has a 43 hectares (110 acres) 18-hole golf course.
