= 2026 Asian Tour =

Golf tour season

2026 Asian Tour season
- Duration: 5 February 2026 – 15 November 2026
- Number of official events: 14 (Note: A further three tournaments were either cancelled or postponed.)
- Most wins: (South Korea) Song Min-hyuk (2)
- Order of Merit: (Thailand) Pavit Tangkamolprasert
- Rookie of the Year: (South Korea) Song Min-hyuk

The 2026 Asian Tour is the 31st season of the modern Asian Tour (formerly the Asian PGA Tour), the main professional golf tour in Asia (outside of Japan) since it was established in 1995.

== PGA Tour and European Tour partnership ==
In July, it was announced that the PGA Tour and the European Tour had entered into a partnership with the Asian Tour.

== Schedule ==
The following table lists official events during the 2026 season.

Date	Tournament	Host country	Purse (US$)	Winner (Note: The number in brackets after each winner's name is the number of Asian Tour events they had won up to and including that tournament. This information is only shown for Asian Tour members.)	OWGR points	Other tours (Note: ANZ − PGA Tour of Australasia; CHN − China Tour; IGPL − Indian Golf Premier League; KOR − Korean Tour; TWN − Taiwan PGA Tour.)	Notes
8 Feb	Philippine Golf Championship	Philippines	500,000	(South Korea) Cho Woo-young (1)	7.78		New tournament
1 Mar	New Zealand Open	New Zealand	NZ$2,000,000	(New Zealand) Daniel Hillier (1)	10.08	ANZ	
5 Apr	International Series Japan	Japan	2,000,000	(Australia) Travis Smyth (2)	11.07		International Series
26 Apr	Singapore Open	Singapore	2,000,000	(South Korea) Ham Jeong-woo (1)	9.61		International Series
3 May	GS Caltex Maekyung Open	South Korea	₩1,300,000,000	(South Korea) Song Min-hyuk (1)	8.86	KOR	
10 May	Taiwan Glass Taifong Open	Taiwan	500,000	(South Africa) Ian Snyman (1)	7.43	TWN	
24 May	Kolon Korea Open	South Korea	₩1,400,000,000	(South Korea) Yang Ji-ho (1)	9.27	KOR	
7 Jun	Am Green IGPL Bharath Classic	Morocco	500,000	(Sweden) Charlie Lindh (1)	6.48	IGPL	
14 Jun	International Series Morocco	Morocco	2,000,000	(Hong Kong) Kho Taichi (2)	10.82		International Series
20 Sep	Yeangder Tournament Players Championship	Taiwan	1,200,000	(Thailand) Pavit Tangkamolprasert (3)	7.84	TWN	
27 Sep	Mercuries Taiwan Masters	Taiwan	1,200,000	(Taiwan) Hung Chien-yao (1)	6.89	TWN	
~~11 Oct~~	International Series India	India	~~2,000,000~~	Cancelled	–		International Series
18 Oct	SJM Macao Open	Macau	1,000,000	(Taiwan) Wang Wei-hsuan (1)	8.64		
25 Oct	Link Hong Kong Open	Hong Kong	2,000,000	(United States) John Catlin (7)	10.89		~~International Series~~ (Note: Tournament had International Series event status removed following the restructuring of LIV Golf after the Public Investment Fund's announcement of withdrawal of funding.)
~~8 Nov~~	International Series China	China	~~2,000,000~~	Cancelled	–	CHN	International Series (Note: Also a new tournament.)
15 Nov	Philippine Open	Philippines	1,000,000	(South Korea) Song Min-hyuk (2)	7.12		~~International Series~~
~~21 Nov~~	PIF Saudi International	Saudi Arabia	~~5,000,000~~	Postponed (Note: Postponed due to the 2026 Iran war.)			~~International Series~~

== Order of Merit ==
The Order of Merit was based on tournament results during the season, calculated using a points-based system. The leading player on the Order of Merit earned status to play on the 2027 European Tour (DP World Tour).

Position	Player	Points	Status earned
1	(Thailand) Pavit Tangkamolprasert	1,374	Promoted to European Tour
2	(Australia) Travis Smyth	1,226	Already exempt (Note: Smyth was already exempt due to winning the 2025–26 PGA Tour of Australasia Order of Merit.)
3	(South Korea) Song Min-hyuk	1,125	
4	(South Africa) Ian Snyman	982	
5	(South Korea) Ham Jeong-woo	969	

== Awards ==
Award	Winner	Ref.
Player of the Year (Kyi Hla Han Award)		
Rookie of the Year	(South Korea) Song Min-hyuk	

== See also ==
- 2026 Asian Development Tour
