= Railway Ecological Golf Club =

Club information
- Location: Golf Course Road, Jamalpur, Bihar 811214, India
- Established: 1912
- Tota holes: 18
- Par: 70
- Length: 5743
- Slope rating: 113

Railway Ecological Golf Club is one of the prominent golf course clubs in India that comes under Eastern Railway, Jamalpur Dist., Munger, Bihar and has been affiliated to Indian Golf Union.

== History ==
Railway Ecological Club was built around 1912 as a recreational 9- hole affairs by the British making it one of the oldest Golf Course Club of India. Initially, it was named 'Central Institute Golf Club', which was renamed REGC in 2005 to gain more publicity for Indian Railway. In 2005 only, it was re-created as 18 hole Championship Course by adding more holes.

The longest running tournaments at the REGC were Instituted by British- The Monsoon Cup 1912 and The Jamalpur Golf trophy in 1913 presented by B. Sinclair Wedderburn. Both the trophies are kept at RECG memorabilia.

== Detailing ==
RCGC has an 18-hole golf course with the following detail:

- Yardage: 5743
- Par: 70
- Rating: 67.0
- Mostly flat terrain, small greens and natural water hazards.
