= Iloilo Golf and Country Club =

Private members-only golf course and club in Santa Barbara, Iloilo, Philippines

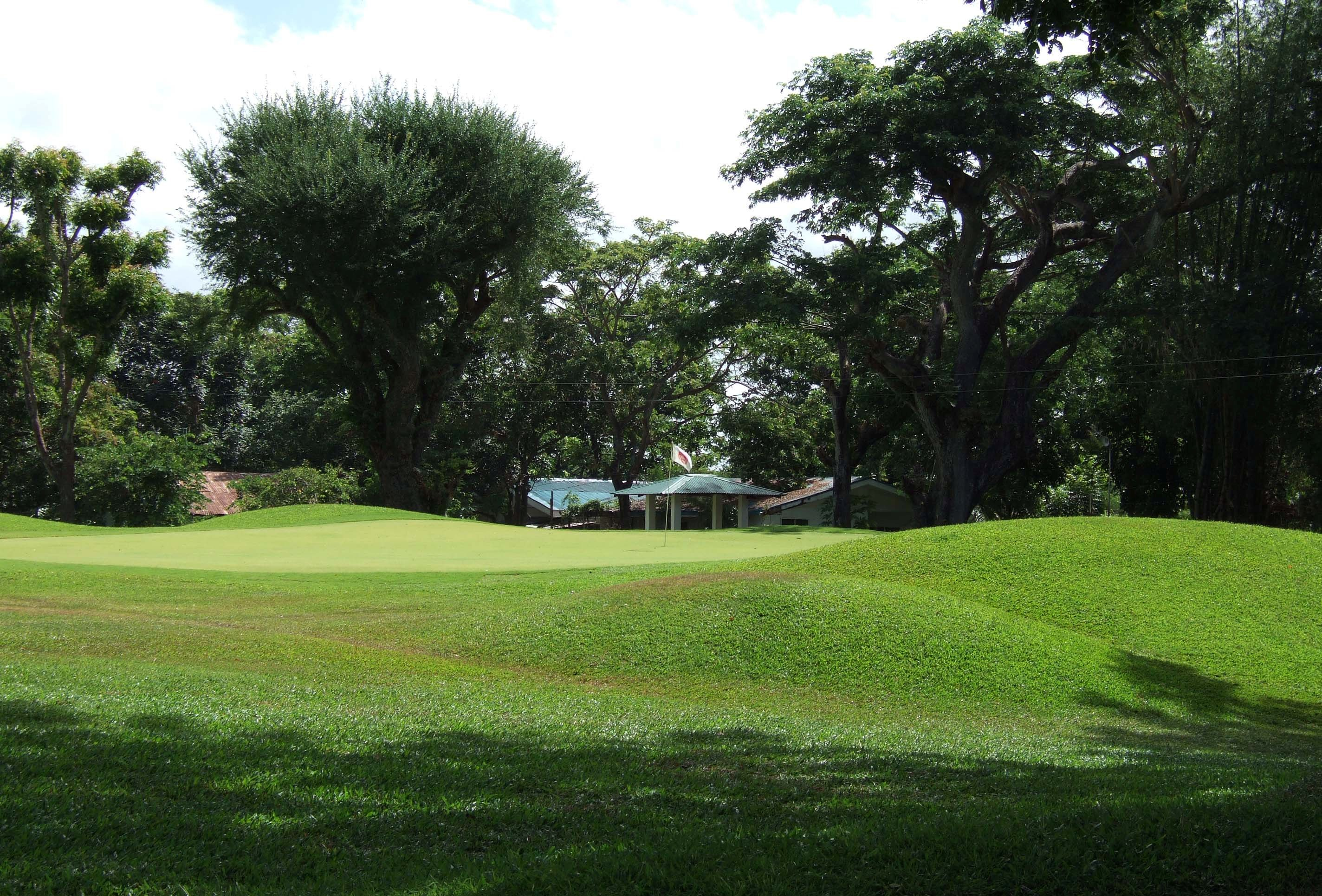

- Location within Philippines
- Interactive map of Iloilo Golf and Country Club
- 10°49′16″N 122°31′19″E

Club information
- Location: Santa Barbara, Philippines
- Established: 1907
- Type: private
- Owner: Iloilo Golf and Country Club, Inc.
- Total holes: 18

The Iloilo Golf and Country Club, Inc., formerly and informally known as the Santa Barbara Golf Course, is a private members-only golf course and club based in Santa Barbara, Iloilo. It spans a 35-hectare (86-acre) area of plain and rolling hills in Barangay San Sebastian in Santa Barbara. It is considered one of the first golf clubs in the Philippines and the oldest existing golf course in Southeast Asia.

It was the first Philippine golf club to be accepted as an affiliate of the Royal and Ancient Golf Club of St. Andrews, one of the oldest and most prestigious golf clubs in the world, based in Scotland. Iloilo Golf and Country Club also hosted the Philippine Open 24 times between 1935 and 1955, and again from 1957 to 1959.

== History ==
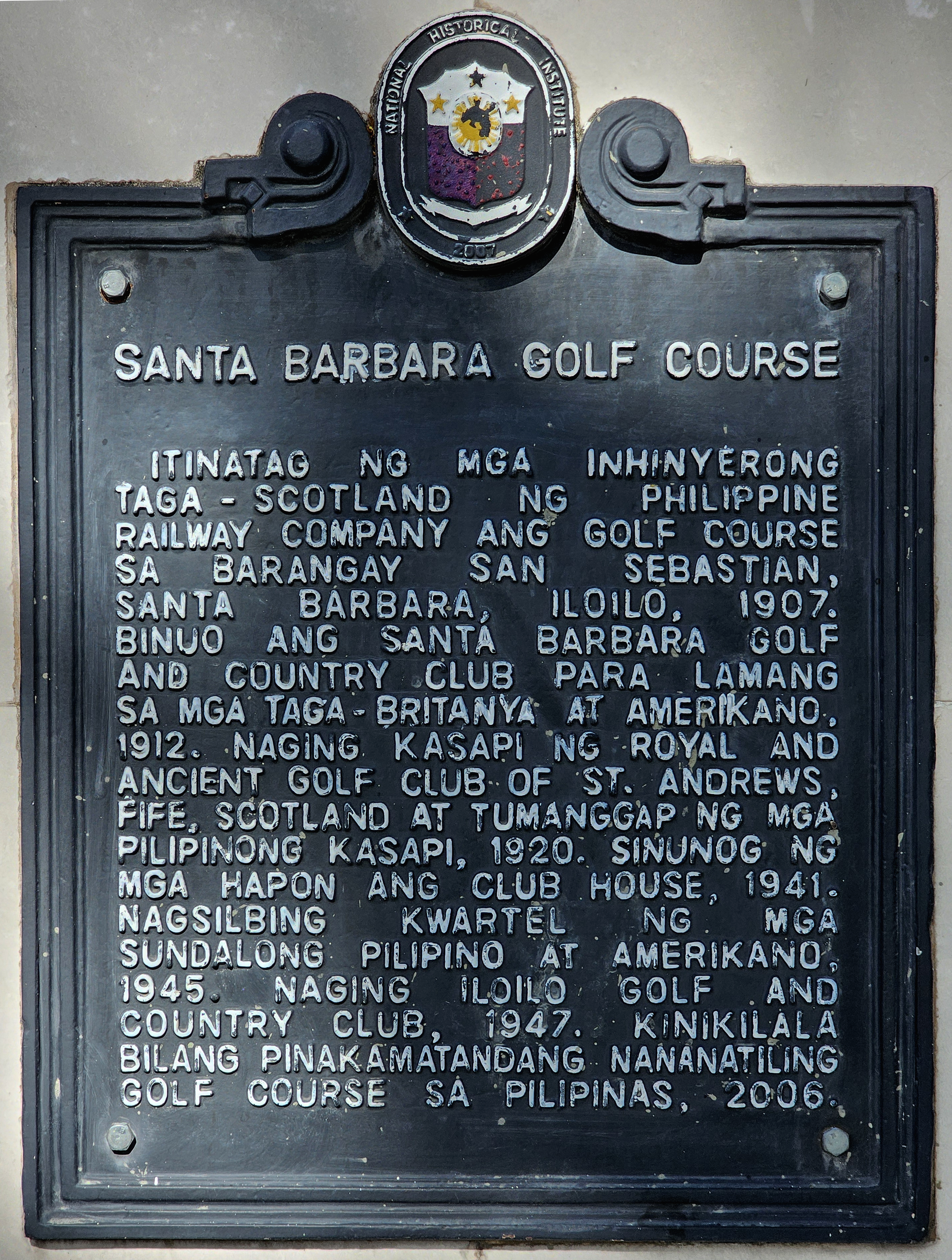
National Historical Institute marker installed at the club house

The golf course was established as the Santa Barbara Golf Course in 1907 by a group of Scottish expatriates involved in building the Panay line of Panay Railways, completed the same year. It opened to the public in 1913 as a basic 9-hole course. Initially, the club was exclusive to English and Scottish migrants, but by the late 1920s, wealthy Filipino landowners gained entry, including Mariano Cacho, Oscar Ledesma, Tomas Confesor, William Gemperle, and the brothers Eugenio and Fernando Lopez. With the establishment of the Philippine Commonwealth in 1935, more Filipinos became involved in government and business, further enhancing Iloilo’s mestizo elite to acquired economic power.

The Santa Barbara Golf Course became a prominent golfing hub, attracting enthusiasts not only from the Visayas but also from Manila. Its skilled caddies produced talented professionals sought after by clubs in Manila, including Siodina, Nadales, Rates, Pinet, and Sinfuego, reflecting the course's significant influence. Notable American and British golfers like Gene Sarazen and Jug McSpaden frequented Santa Barbara during their visits to the Philippines. After World War II, returning migrants, together with members of the now-destroyed Polo Golf Club in Polo, Arevalo, Iloilo City, reestablished the club as the Iloilo Golf and Country Club in 1947.

In 1935, the Santa Barbara Golf Course, later officially known as the Iloilo Golf and Country Club, became the new host of the Philippine Open, taking over from the Manila Golf and Country Club. It hosted the tournament from 1935 to 1955 and again from 1957 to 1959, for a total of 24 editions. The event was later transferred back to Metro Manila in 1960, with the Wack Wack Golf and Country Club in Mandaluyong serving as the new host venue.

The National Historical Institute (NHI) validated the club's history and designated it a national historical site in 2007, marking its centenary year. The unveiling of its historical marker was attended by former President Fidel V. Ramos, an avid golfer himself, NHI Director Ambeth Ocampo, British Embassy dignitaries, members of the Iloilo elite, and participants of the Mayor’s Cup.

It will host the 24th and 25th Bamboo Tee Golf Tournaments in 2026 and 2027, respectively.
