= Bharath Classic =

Tournament information
- Location: El Jadida, Morocco
- Established: 2025
- Courses: Mazagan Beach & Golf Resort
- Par: 72
- Length: 7,448 yards (6,810 m)
- Tours: Asian Tour; Indian Golf Premier League
- Format: Stroke play
- Prize fund: US$500,000
- Month played: June

Tournament record score
- Aggregate: 270 Poosit Supupramai (2025); 270 Charlie Lindh (2026)
- To par: −18 as above

Current champion
- (Sweden) Charlie Lindh

Location map
- Location in Morocco

The Bharath Classic is a professional golf tournament, co-sanctioned by the Asian Tour and Indian Golf Premier League (IGPL).

== Background ==
The inaugural event was held in November 2025 at Kensville Golf Resort in India. In 2026, due to fall fixture congestion the event was moved from December to June, and because of the 2026 Iran war it was moved to Morocco.

== Winners ==
Year	Tours (Note: ASA − Asian Tour; IGPL − Indian Golf Premier League.)	Winner	Score	To par	Margin of victory	Runner(s)-up	Ref.
Am Green IGPL Bharath Classic
2026	ASA, IGPL	(Sweden) Charlie Lindh	270	−18	4 strokes	(United States) Charles Porter (Thailand) Settee Prakongvech	
Bharath Classic Gujarat
2025	ASA, IGPL	(Thailand) Poosit Supupramai	270	−18	1 stroke	(South Korea) Cho Woo-young	
