= Al Panlilio =

Filipino businessman

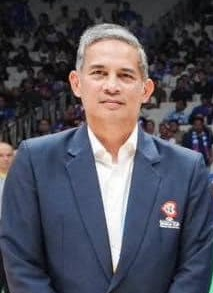
- Panlilio in 2023
- Born: Alfredo S. Panlilio
- Education: San Francisco State University (BS); Hong Kong University of Science and Technology (MBA)
- Occupation: Businessperson
- Known for: President of the Samahang Basketbol ng Pilipinas; Member of the FIBA Central Board

Alfredo S. Panlilio is a Filipino businessman and sports executive. He has been the director, president and chief executive officer of PLDT Inc. since June 8, 2021, and wireless subsidiary Smart Communications Inc. since August 8, 2019, and currently, the 77th president of the Management Association of the Philippines.

== Early life and education ==
Panlilio's father worked his way up at Philippine Airlines, starting as a porter and eventually getting promoted as airport services head. The promotion allowed him to work in Hawaii and in San Francisco, paving the way for Al and his younger brother to study abroad. Before studying abroad, Al first studied at Ateneo from his grade school years up to high school. He then graduated from the University of San Francisco, with a degree in business management (major in computer systems).

== Career ==
Panlilio returned to the Philippines, at first to pursue a semi-professional basketball career with a Fuji Soy Sauce team in the Philippine Amateur Basketball League. However, after one conference, he realized basketball was not for him and decided to enter the corporate sector.

Panlilio started out as a software programmer. He then became a system analyst for the global IT firm Software Ventures Incorporated for five years, rising up their ranks as an assistant manager. He also started a popcorn machine business with his brother during this time. In 1992, he moved to IBM, working at first as a client executive, then becoming an industry head as he dabbled in other sectors such as banking and transportation.

In 1997, Panlilio took the position of vice president at the Lopez Group of Companies, managing ABS-CBN Corporation, BayanTel, and Sky Cable. During this time, Manny V. Pangilinan became an investor in the Philippine Long Distance Telephone Company (PLDT). Pangilinan then offered him a job. In July 1999, Panlilio started his career with PLDT.

Within the PLDT Group, Panlilio holds leadership positions in subsidiaries involved in ICT, digital banking, and more. During his previous tenure in PLDT before returning as its chief revenue officer on July 1, 2019, Panlilio served as senior vice president from May 2001 to December 2010 and was the president of international arm PLDT Global from June 2004 to December 2010.

With PLDT as a longtime supporter of the Philippines' digital transformation, Panlilio is among the founding members under the Digital Infrastructure pillar of the Private Sector Advisory Council (PSAC), formed in July 2022.

Prior to returning to PLDT Group, Panlilio was the senior vice president and head of Customer Retail Services and Corporate Communications at Manila Electric Company (Meralco) from September 10, 2010, to June 30, 2019, and held designations in Meralco's subsidiaries involved in renewable energy, multi-channel payments processing, and more.

=== Involvement in sports ===
Panlilio grew up playing basketball at a young age. He played basketball for Ateneo Grade School and for Ateneo High School's Blue Eaglets. With the Eaglets, he got to play alongside Chot Reyes when Ateneo moved to the UAAP in the late 1970s. He also pursued a semi-professional basketball career before becoming a businessman.

As a sports advocate, Panlilio sits as president of the MVP Sports Foundation, second vice president of FIBA Asia Central Board, first vice president of the Philippine Olympic Committee and heads the FIBA Basketball World Cup 2023 local organizing committee. He is also the president of Samahang Basketbol ng Pilipinas (SBP), the country's governing basketball federation from 2017 to 2025.. Panlilio was also co-opted as a member of the International Basketball Federation's (FIBA) Central Board in 2023.

Panlilio was elected as president of the National Golf Association of the Philippines in April 2026.

== Personal life ==
Panlilio is married to Angela Panlilio, an artist and photographer. They have three children.
