= Larry Montes =

Filipino professional golfer (1911–1996)

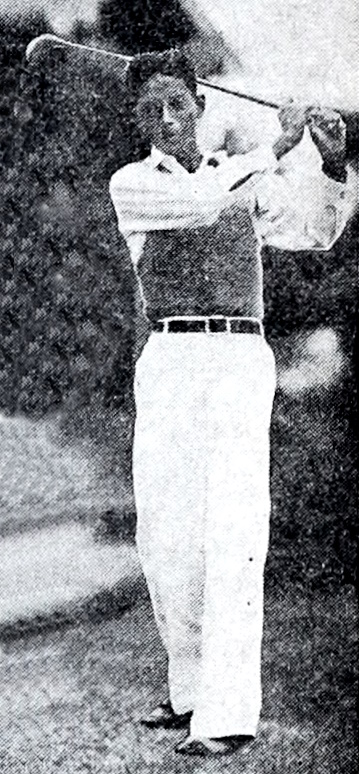
- Montes in 1928

Personal information
- Full name: Abundio Montes
- Nationality: Philippines
- Born: February 28, 1911 Santa Maria, Bulacan, Philippine Islands
- Died: 1996 (aged 84 or 85) United States

Career
- Sport: Golf
- Turned professional: 1932
- Professional wins: 15

Achievements and awards
- PSA Half Century Athlete: 1951
- PSA Athlete of the Year: 1951

Abundio "Larry" Montes (February 28, 1911 – 1996) was a Filipino professional golfer who is the 13-time Philippine Open champion.

== Early life and education ==
Montes was born on February 28, 1911, in Santa Maria, Bulacan. Montes has at least two younger brothers and two younger sisters. His family moved to Manila when he was age two where he later attended school. He studied at the Tondo Primary School and Meisic School with him becoming part of the latter's volleyball team. He finished his secondary studies at the old Manila High School in 1927.

== Career ==
=== Caddie work and debut ===
Montes started working caddie at Municipal Links golf course in Intramuros. He and his brother Vicente were asked by a police officer to carry bags for American golfers in 1923. Montes observed golfers play and taught himself of the sport.

Montes caught the attention of Shanghai-based dentist Norman L. Downs who sponsored his entry fee for the Philippine Open in 1928. He lost his temper, failed to execute an easy putt and was penalized conceding the Open to J.R.H. Mason.

=== 1929 Philippine Open win ===
At the 1929 Philippine Open, Montes became first native Filipino to win the annual golf tournament. He was allegedly barred from the Manila Golf Club's clubhouse during the awarding ceremony which led to William James Shaw establishing the Wack Wack Golf and Country Club in the following year.

=== 1929 to 1932 ===
After the 1929 Open win, Downs funded Montes' trip abroad. He left in March 13, 1931, to go to the United States and Europe. Montes took part at the 1931 French Open and finished as runners-up. He qualified for the British Open but missed the 36-hole cut. In the United States, Montes played in the U.S. Open in Toledo as well as other tournaments. He returned to the Philippines by October 1931.

Montes won the 1931 and 1932 Philippine Opens.

=== Japan ===
In late 1932, Montes received an offer to join the Kasumigaseki Country Club to play professional golf in Japan where he stayed for three years. He played at the Japan PGA Championship winning the 1933 and 1934 editions Montes also played at the Japan Open Golf Championship finishing 11th in 1932 and runner-up in 1933. He returned to Manila in late 1935.

=== Later years ===
From 1938 to 1940, Montes lagged behind foreign golfers in the Philippine Open. With Australian golfer Norman Von Nida winning the 1938 and 1939 editions and Jug McSpaden in 1940. Montes went on to win nine more editions of the Philippine Open from 1941 to 1954. He also played in Australia.

He had won games against top golfers of his time such as Norman Von Nida and Jug McSpaden by the 1940s.

Montes also played in the Canada Cup with Celestino Tugot in 1954 and 1955; with Vic Allin in 1959; with Ben Arda in 1960.

== Later life and death ==
Montes emigrated to the United States by the 1980s. He died in 1996.

== Personal life ==
Montes was married and had five children as of 1949.

== Honors ==
Montes was inducted to the Golf Hall of Fame in 1990. The Philippine Sportswriters Association named Montes among the Half Century Athletes and one of the Athletes of the Year for 1951.

== Tournament wins ==
- 1929 Philippine Open
- 1931 Philippine Open
- 1932 Philippine Open, Japan PGA Championship
- 1933 Japan PGA Championship
- 1936 Philippine Open
- 1937 Philippine Open
- 1941 Philippine Open (February)
- 1941 Philippine Open (December)
- 1943 Philippine Open
- 1944 Philippine Open
- 1948 Philippine Open
- 1951 Philippine Open
- 1953 Philippine Open
- 1954 Philippine Open

== Team appearances ==
- Canada Cup (representing the Philippines): 1954, 1955, 1959, 1960
