= William James Shaw =

American entrepreneur and philanthropist in the Philippines

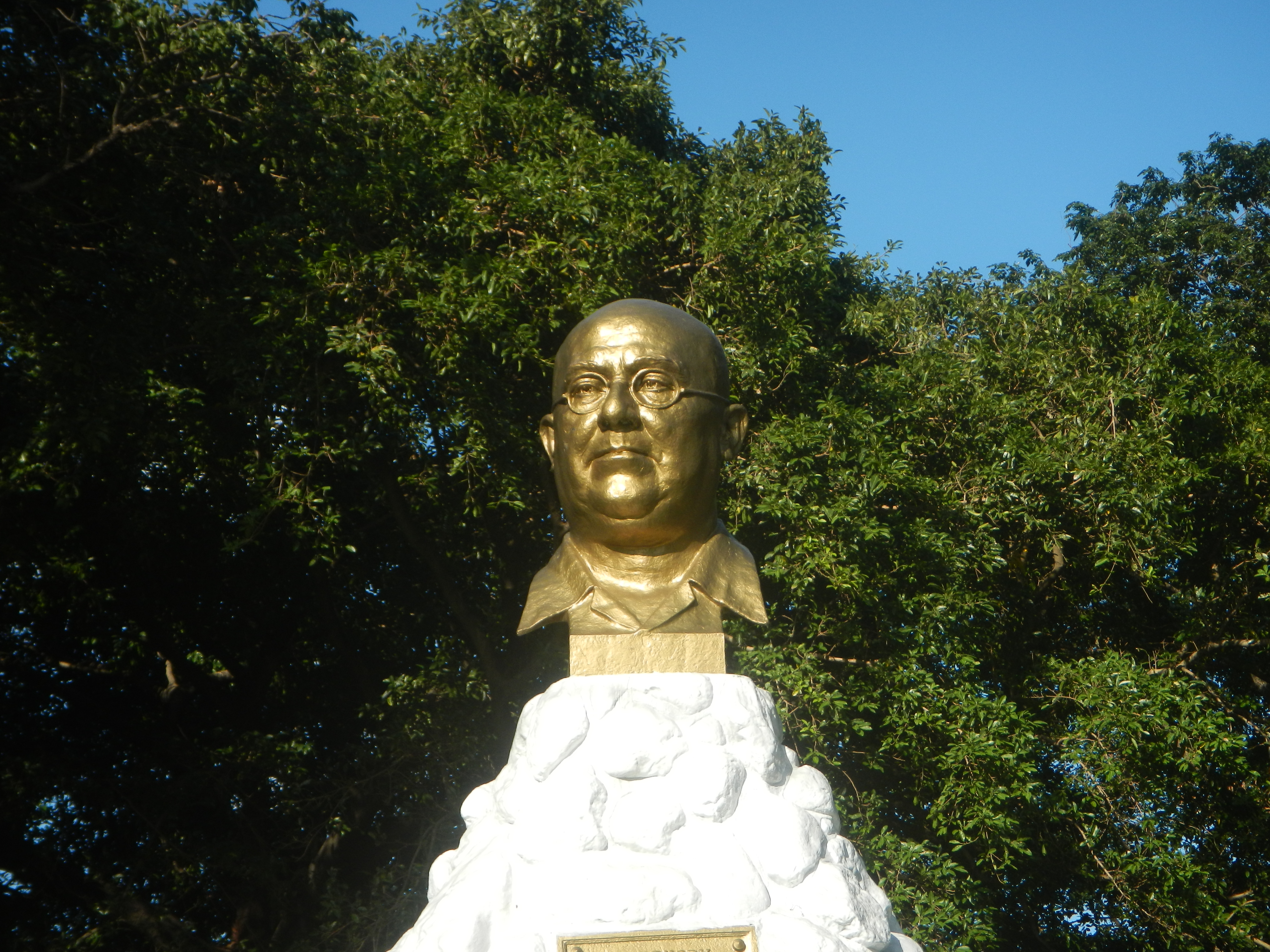
- A bust of Shaw in Mandaluyong
- Born: William James Bernard Shaw; September 20, 1877; Barnet, Vermont, U.S.
- Died: March 1, 1939 (aged 61); Caloocan, Rizal, Commonwealth of the Philippines
- Other names: Bill Shaw
- Occupations: Entrepreneur and philanthropist
- Known for: Founder of the Wack Wack Golf and Country Club

William James Bernard Shaw (September 20, 1877 – March 1, 1939), also known as Bill Shaw, was an American entrepreneur and philanthropist based in the Philippines.

Shaw worked as a busboy on a US Army transport ship to pay his passage to Manila, arriving in 1901 and never leaving hence. He eventually became part owner of the Atlantic, Gulf & Pacific Steamship Corporation. He also served as President of the Rotary Club of Manila from 1925 to 1926.

Shaw is known for being the founder, organizer and president of Wack Wack Golf and Country Club. Shaw started Wack Wack in 1930 – because he was disgusted that Larry Montes, a caddie who had won the 1929 Philippine Open tournament and later many subsequent tournaments at the Manila Golf Club, of which Shaw was a member, had been asked to leave the tournament celebration, by virtue of a rule against the presence of caddies inside the Manila Golf Club. He was also married to a Filipina, which was a controversial issue to the members of exclusive clubs like Manila Golf Club.

Shaw was a member of the board of the Boy Scouts of America Philippine Islands Council No. 545.

In 1939, the portion of Pasig Boulevard in Mandaluyong was renamed Shaw Boulevard, where a small monument of Shaw stands at the intersection between Shaw Boulevard and Wack Wack Road leading to the country club. Shaw Boulevard MRT station, the now-defunct William J. Shaw Theater at Shangri-La Plaza, and the William Shaw Little Theater at De La Salle University–Manila are also named after him.

== Bibliography ==
- Gleeck, Lewis Edward Jr. Archived 2016-10-12 at the Wayback Machine (1912–2005), Bill Shaw: The Man and the Legend, San Juan, Metro Manila: William J. Shaw Foundation, 1998.
- ___, The Manila Americans (1901–1964), Manila: Carmelo & Bauermann, 1977.
- ___, Over Seventy-five Years of Philippine-American History: The Army and Navy Club of Manila, Manila: Carmelo & Bauermann, 1976.
- Zafra, Jessica, The Life and Legacy of William J. Shaw, San Juan, Metro Manila: William J. Shaw Foundation, 2009.
