= Valley Golf and Country Club =

Golf club in Antipolo, Philippines

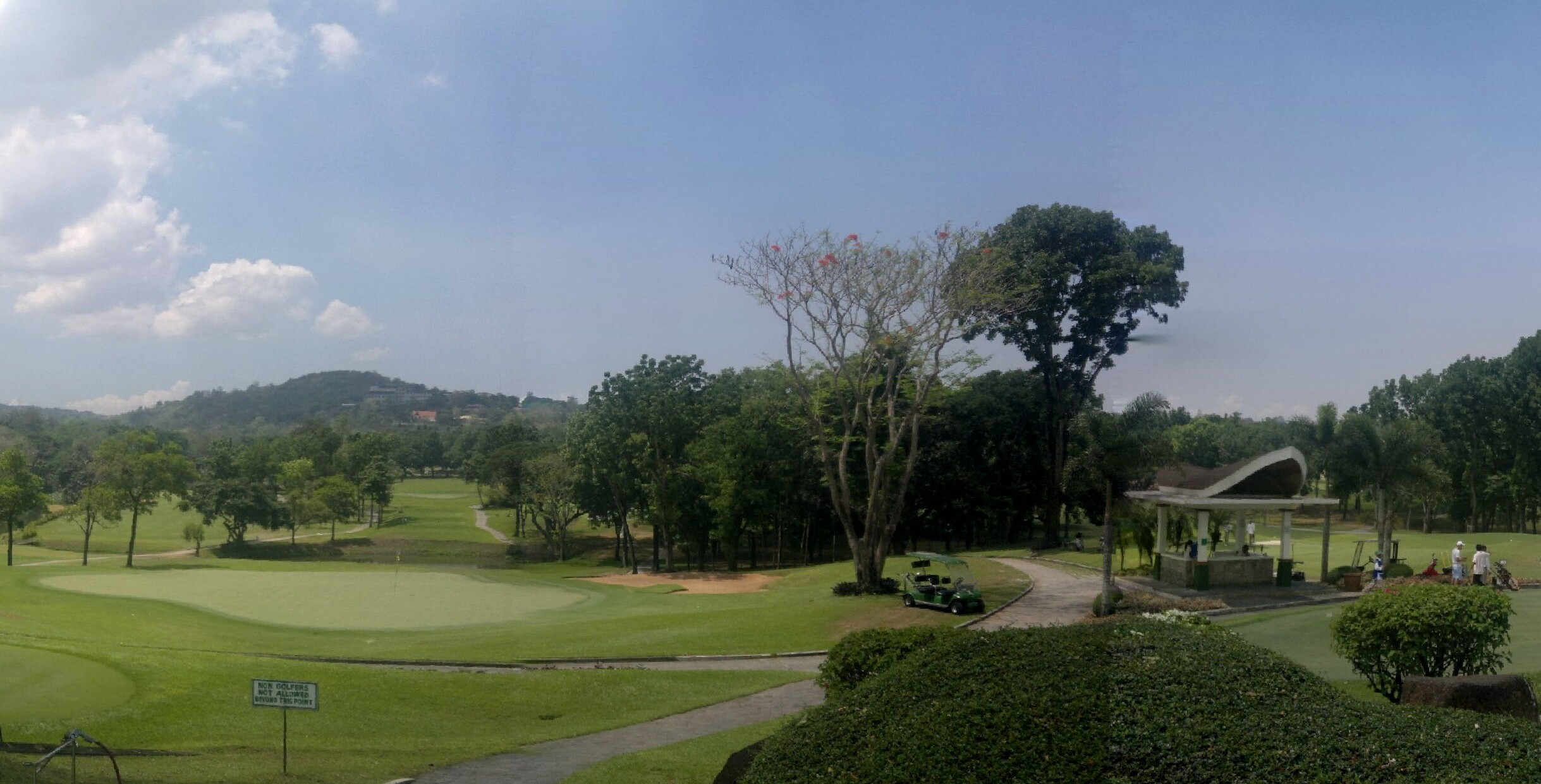

Club information
- Location: Antipolo, Rizal, Philippines
- Established: 1958
- Type: Private
- Owner: Valley Golf and Country Club, Inc.
- Tota holes: 18
- Tournaments: Philippine Open (1975, 1983, 1991, 2010); SEA Games (1991)

South Course
- Designed by: Jas H. Scott
- Par: 72

North Course
- Par: 70

Valley Golf and Country Club or simply Valley Golf is a golf course and country club in Antipolo, Rizal, Philippines.

== History ==
The Valley Golf and Country Club was established in 1958 by a group of businessmen led by Celso Tuason.

The golf course was opened for play in 1961. Australian Jas H. Scott designed the golf course layout. In 1989, Valley Golf was expanded by the addition of another golf course was built on the north.

The golf tournament of the 1991 SEA Games was held at the south course.

The Valley Golf has also hosted the Philippine Open; in 1975, 1983, 1991 and 2010.

== Facilities ==
- South Course – Par-72 nine-hole course
- North Course – Par-70 nine-hole course

== Major tournaments hosted ==
Year	Tournament	Winner
1975	Philippine Open	(Taiwan) Kuo Chie-Hsiung
1981	Philippine Open	(United States) Tom Sieckmann
1983	Philippine Open	(Taiwan) Kuo Chie-Hsiung
1991	Philippine Open	(United States) Dennis Paulson
2010	Philippine Open	(Philippines) Artemio Murakami
