= Philippine Open (golf) =

Tournament information
- Location: Manila, Philippines
- Established: 1913
- Course: Manila Southwoods Golf & Country Club
- Par: 72
- Length: 7,138 yards (6,527 m)
- Tours: Asian Tour; Asia Golf Circuit; OneAsia Tour; Philippine Golf Tour; PGT Asia
- Format: Stroke play
- Prize fund: US$1,000,000
- Month played: January

Tournament record score
- Aggregate: 259 Kevin Wentworth (1997)
- To par: −17 Elmer Salvador (2009)

Current champion
- (South Korea) Song Min-hyuk

Location map
- Location in the Philippines

The Philippine Open is an annual men's professional golf tournament, currently played on the Asian Tour.

== History ==
The Philippine Open was first held in Caloocan in 1913 and was sponsored by the Manila Golf Club. It was moved to the Iloilo Golf and Country Club in 1935, where it remained until 1959. In 1960, the tournament was transferred to the Wack Wack Golf and Country Club. In the late 1980s, the National Golf Association of the Philippines (NGAP) took over the organization of the tournament and held it in other courses in the country.

The event was held in a variety of different golf courses around the Philippines and was an official money event on the Asian Tour from 1999 to 2015, having previously been a founding tournament on the Asia Golf Circuit. In March 2006 the NGAP granted all marketing rights for the tournament from 2006 to 2010 to the Asian Tour, which announced an aspiration to increase the prize fund from the 2006 level of US$200,000 to $1 million. In 2014, the prize fund was $300,000.

The 1967 event included a full-field of 160 players.

In 2003, the Wack Wack Golf and Country Club attempted to host an independent tournament called the "Wack Wack Philippine Open Golf Championship" scheduled for. The NGAP attempted to enforce its sole right to host a tournament with the "Philippine Open" name. The tournament was not held that year.

There has been two disruptions in the 2010s; the 2013 edition when it was cancelled due to Typhoon Haiyan (Yolanda), and in 2016 due to time constraints with the organizers wanting a venue to commit to a multi-year hosting.

After the 2019 edition was held, the COVID-19 pandemic occurred causing a years long hiatus. The Philippine Open eventually returned in 2025.

In 2026, the Philippine Open was initially made part of the International Series. However the event was almost cancelled following the withdrawal of BingoPlus as title sponsor. The tournament was reverted to a regular Asian Tour event after the International Series was scrapped.

== Venues ==
The following venues have been used since the founding of the Philippine Open in 1913.

Venue	Location	First	Last	Times
Manila Golf and Country Club	Caloocan	1913	1934	20
Iloilo Golf and Country Club	Iloilo	1935	1959	24
Wack Wack Golf and Country Club	Mandaluyong	1956	2014	33
Valley Golf and Country Club	Rizal	1975	2010	5
Villamor Golf Club	Manila	1984	1986	2
Puerto Azul Golf and Country Club	Luzon	1989	1992	3
Manila Southwoods Golf and Country Club	Manila	1993	2025	5
Apo Golf and Country Club	Davao	1995	1995	1
Camp John Hay Golf Club	Baguio	1997	1997	1
Riviera Golf and Country Club	Cavite	1998	2000	3
Mount Malarayat Golf and Country Club	Batangas	2005	2009	2
Luisita Golf and Country Club	Tarlac	2015	2015	1
The Country Club	Laguna	2017	2019	3

== Winners ==
Year	Tour(s) (Note: AGC/FEC − Asia Golf Circuit/Far East Circuit; ASA − Asian Tour; ONE − OneAsia Tour; PGTA − PGT Asia; PHI − Philippine Golf Tour.)	Winner	Score	To par	Margin of victory	Runner(s)-up	Venue	Ref.
Philippine Open
2026	ASA	(South Korea) Song Min-hyuk	265	−15	7 strokes	(South Korea) Ham Jeong-woo (South Korea) Jung Jae-hyun (South Korea) Kim Min-kyu (Thailand) Sarit Suwannarut (South Korea) Wang Jeung-hun (Thailand) Rattanon Wannasrichan	Manila Southwoods	
Smart Infinity Philippine Open
2025	ASA	(France) Julien Sale	269	−11	1 stroke	(Japan) Tomoyo Ikemura (Thailand) Sadom Kaewkanjana	Manila Southwoods	
2020–2024: No tournament
Solaire Philippine Open
2019	PGTA	(Philippines) Clyde Mondilla	290	+2	2 strokes	(United States) Nicolas Paez	Country Club	
2018	ONE, PGTA	(Philippines) Miguel Tabuena (2)	289	+1	Playoff	(Thailand) Prom Meesawat	Country Club	
2017	PHI	(England) Steve Lewton	287	−1	Playoff	(United States) Johannes Veerman	Country Club	
2016: No tournament
Philippine Open
2015	ASA	(Philippines) Miguel Tabuena	202 (Note: Shortened to 54 holes due to rain.)	−14	1 stroke	(Australia) Scott Barr	Luisita	
ICTSI Philippine Open
2014	ASA	(Australia) Marcus Both	282	−6	2 strokes	(Philippines) Jay Bayron (Australia) Nathan Holman (Philippines) Antonio Lascuña (Bangladesh) Siddikur Rahman (Thailand) Arnond Vongvanij	Wack Wack	
2013: No tournament
2012	ASA	(Singapore) Mardan Mamat	280	−8	5 strokes	(South Korea) Mo Joong-kyung	Wack Wack	
2011	ASA	(United States) Berry Henson	283	−5	1 stroke	(Philippines) Jay Bayron	Wack Wack	
Philippine Open
2010		(Philippines) Artemio Murakami	277	−11	2 strokes	(Philippines) Elmer Salvador	Valley	
2009		(Philippines) Elmer Salvador	271	−17	3 strokes	(Netherlands) Guido van der Valk	Mount Malarayat	
2008	ASA	(Philippines) Angelo Que	283	−5	1 stroke	(Malaysia) Danny Chia	Wack Wack	
2007	ASA	(Philippines) Frankie Miñoza (2)	278	−10	2 strokes	(Philippines) Gerald Rosales	Wack Wack	
2006	ASA	(Australia) Scott Strange	280	−8	5 strokes	(South Korea) Park Jun-won	Wack Wack	
2005	ASA	(Australia) Adam Le Vesconte	272	−12	4 strokes	(Philippines) Gerald Rosales	Mount Malarayat	
DHL Philippine Open
2004	ASA	(United States) Edward Michaels	282	−2	3 strokes	(Philippines) Juvic Pagunsan (a)	Riviera	
2003: No tournament
Casino Filipino Philippine Open
2002	ASA	(Canada) Rick Gibson	283	−5	4 strokes	(United States) Robert Jacobson	Wack Wack	
Philippine Open
2001		(Philippines) Felix Casas	282	−6	5 strokes	(Philippines) Danny Zarate	Wack Wack	
2000		(Philippines) Gerald Rosales	293	+9	2 strokes	(Philippines) Antonio Lascuña (Philippines) Rey Pagunsan	Riviera	
Casino Filipino Philippine Open
1999	ASA	(United States) Anthony Kang	273	−15	1 stroke	(South Africa) James Kingston (Japan) Kazuyoshi Yonekura	Manila Southwoods	
Philippine Open
1998	AGC	(Philippines) Frankie Miñoza	278	−10	2 strokes	(United States) Christian Chernock	Riviera	
1997	AGC	(United States) Kevin Wentworth	259	−13	3 strokes	(United States) Larry Barber (Philippines) Mars Pucay (United States) Tim Straub	Camp John Hay	
U-Bix Philippine Open
1996	AGC	(Australia) Rob Whitlock	278	−10	Playoff	(United States) Tim Straub	Manila Southwoods	
Dole Casino Filipino Philippine Open
1995	AGC	(Mexico) Carlos Espinosa	282	−6	2 strokes	(Sweden) Olle Nordberg	Apo	
Manila Southwoods Philippine Open
1994	AGC	(Paraguay) Carlos Franco	280	−8	Playoff	(South Korea) Choi Sang-ho	Manila Southwoods	
Philippine Open
1993	AGC	(Taiwan) Yeh Chang-ting	281	−7	1 stroke	(Mexico) Carlos Espinosa	Manila Southwoods	
1992	AGC	(Taiwan) Wang Ter-chang	289	+1	Playoff	(Taiwan) Hsieh Chin-sheng	Puerto Azul	
1991	AGC	(United States) Dennis Paulson	281	−7	Playoff	(Taiwan) Chen Tze-chung	Valley	
San Miguel/Coca-Cola Philippine Open
1990	AGC	(Philippines) Robert Pactolerin	287	−1	2 strokes	(Taiwan) Chen Liang-hsi (Taiwan) Lai Chung-jen (United States) Lee Porter	Puerto Azul	
1989	AGC	(United States) Emlyn Aubrey	276	−8	2 strokes	(Philippines) Mario Siodina	Puerto Azul	
Coca-Cola Philippine Open
1988	AGC	(Taiwan) Hsieh Chin-sheng	283	−5	5 strokes	(United States) Steve Bowman	Wack Wack	
San Miguel Philippine Open
1987	AGC	(United States) Brian Tennyson	288	E	1 stroke	(Taiwan) Chen Tze-ming	Wack Wack	
Philippine Open
1986	AGC (Note: In 1979 and between 1984 and 1986, the event was sanctioned by the Asia Golf Circuit, however it was an unofficial money event; therefore the win is considered unofficial on that tour.)	(Philippines) Mario Manubay	280	−8		(United States) Michael Allen (Canada) Tony Grimes	Villamor	
1985	AGC	(United States) Mark Aebli	290	+2	1 stroke	(Philippines) Frankie Miñoza	Wack Wack	
1984	AGC	(Philippines) Rudy Labares	272	−16	17 strokes	(Philippines) Mario Siodina	Villamor	
1983	AGC	(Taiwan) Lu Hsi-chuen (2)	277	−11	3 strokes	(Japan) Ikuo Shirahama	Valley	
1982	AGC	(Taiwan) Hsieh Min-Nan	292	+4	Playoff	(Taiwan) Hsu Sheng-san	Wack Wack	
1981	AGC	(United States) Tom Sieckmann	287	−1	4 strokes	(Taiwan) Lu Hsi-chuen	Valley	
1980	AGC	(Taiwan) Lu Hsi-chuen	287	−1	2 strokes	(Philippines) Rudy Labares (Scotland) Sam Torrance	Wack Wack	
1979	AGC	(Philippines) Ben Arda (3)	286	−2	3 strokes	(Taiwan) Hsu Sheng-san (Taiwan) Hung Fa	Wack Wack	
1978	AGC	(Taiwan) Lu Liang-Huan (3)	278	−9	7 strokes	(Taiwan) Kuo Chie-Hsiung	Wack Wack	
1977	AGC	(Taiwan) Hsieh Yung-yo (2)	281	−7	5 strokes	(Taiwan) Hsieh Min-Nan (Taiwan) Kuo Chie-Hsiung	Wack Wack	
1976	AGC	(Philippines) Qiuntin Mancao	281	−7	3 strokes	(Taiwan) Hsu Chi-san (Philippines) Eleuterio Nival	Wack Wack	
1975	AGC	(Taiwan) Kuo Chie-Hsiung	276	−12	8 strokes	(Philippines) Ben Arda	Valley	
1974	AGC	(Taiwan) Lu Liang-Huan (2)	281	−11	Playoff	(Taiwan) Hsu Sheng-san	Wack Wack	
1973	AGC	(South Korea) Kim Seung-hack	289	+1	1 stroke	(Taiwan) Chang Chun-fa (Australia) Graham Marsh	Wack Wack	
1972	AGC	(Japan) Hideyo Sugimoto	286	−2	2 strokes	(Taiwan) Hsieh Yung-yo	Wack Wack	
1971	AGC	(Taiwan) Chen Chien-chung	282	−6	3 strokes	(Taiwan) Hsieh Yung-yo	Wack Wack	
1970	AGC	(Taiwan) Hsieh Yung-yo	282	−6	6 strokes	(Philippines) Eleuterio Nival (Japan) Haruo Yasuda	Wack Wack	
1969	AGC	(Japan) Haruo Yasuda	279	−9	1 stroke	(Philippines) Ben Arda (Taiwan) Hsieh Min-Nan	Wack Wack	
1968	AGC	(Taiwan) Hsu Chi-san	278	−10	8 strokes	(Japan) Shigeru Uchida	Wack Wack	
1967	FEC	(Taiwan) Hsu Sheng-san (a)	283	−5	1 stroke	(Philippines) Celestino Tugot	Wack Wack	
1966	FEC	(Philippines) Luis Silverio (a)	287	−1	1 stroke	(Philippines) Celestino Tugot	Wack Wack	
1965	FEC	(Taiwan) Lu Liang-Huan	288	E	2 strokes	(Taiwan) Hsieh Yung-yo	Wack Wack	
1964	FEC	(Australia) Peter Thomson	285	−3	Playoff	(United States) Doug Sanders	Wack Wack	
1963	FEC	(Philippines) Ben Arda (2)	289	+1	3 strokes	(Japan) Teruo Sugihara	Wack Wack	
1962	FEC	(Philippines) Celestino Tugot (6)	284	−4	1 stroke	(Australia) Kel Nagle	Wack Wack	
1961		(Philippines) Ben Arda	286	−2	2 strokes	(Taiwan) Hsieh Yung-yo	Wack Wack	
1960		(Australia) Frank Phillips	287	−1	1 stroke	(Taiwan) Hsieh Yung-yo	Wack Wack	
1959		(Australia) Bruce Crampton					Iloilo	
1958		(Philippines) Celestino Tugot (5)					Iloilo	
1957		(Philippines) Celestino Tugot (4)					Iloilo	
1956		(Philippines) Celestino Tugot (3)					Wack Wack	
1955		(Philippines) Celestino Tugot (2)	284				Iloilo	
1954		(Philippines) Larry Montes (12)					Iloilo	
1953		(Philippines) Larry Montes (11)	281	−7			Iloilo	
1952		(United States) Lloyd Mangrum	295				Iloilo	
1951		(Philippines) Larry Montes (10)					Iloilo	
1950		(United States) Ed Oliver	285	−3	4 strokes	(Australia) Norman Von Nida	Iloilo	
1949		(Philippines) Celestino Tugot	290			(Philippines) Larry Montes	Iloilo	
1948		(Philippines) Larry Montes (9)					Iloilo	
1945–1947: No tournament
1944		(Philippines) Larry Montes (8)					Iloilo	
1943		(Philippines) Larry Montes (7)					Iloilo	
1942		(Philippines) Larry Montes (6)					Iloilo	
1941		(Philippines) Larry Montes (5)					Iloilo	
1940		(United States) Jug McSpaden	287	−1	4 strokes	(United States) Emery Zimmerman	Iloilo	
1939		(Australia) Norman Von Nida (2)	292	+4	2 strokes	(Japan) Rokuzo Asami (Japan) Seisui Chin	Iloilo	
1938		(Australia) Norman Von Nida				(Philippines) Larry Montes	Iloilo	
1937		(Philippines) Larry Montes (4)					Iloilo	
1936		(Philippines) Larry Montes (3)					Iloilo	
1935		(Philippines) Guillermo A. Navaja					Iloilo	
1934		(Philippines) Casiano Decena					Manila	
1933		(United States) Sidney Baxter					Manila	
1932		(Philippines) Larry Montes (2)					Manila	
1930–31: No tournament
1929		(Philippines) Larry Montes					Manila	
1928		(United States) J. S. Moore (a)					Manila	
1927		(United States) J. R .H. Mason (a) (5)					Manila	
1926		(United States) E. L. Benedict (a)					Manila	
1925		(United States) W. J. Jameson (a)					Manila	
1924		(United States) G. M. Ivory (a)					Manila	
1923		(United States) E. A. Noyes (a)					Manila	
1922		(United States) Walter Z. Smith (a)					Manila	
1921		(United States) J. R .H. Mason (a) (4)					Manila	
1920		(Scotland) Ian Collier Trotter MacGregor (a) (2)					Manila	
1919		(Scotland) Ian Collier Trotter MacGregor (a)					Manila	
1918		(United States) J. R .H. Mason (a) (3)					Manila	
1917		(United States) W. Young (a)					Manila	
1916		(United States) Johnny Grieve (a)					Manila	
1915		(United States) W. J. Adams (a)					Manila	
1914		(United States) J. R .H. Mason (a) (2)					Manila	
1913		(United States) J. R .H. Mason (a)					Manila	

== Multiple winners ==
The players who have won the Philippine Open more than once are the following:

- 12 wins
  - Larry Montes (1929, 1932, 1936, 1937, 1941–1944, 1948, 1951, 1953, 1954)
- 6 wins
  - Celestino Tugot (1949, 1955–1958, 1962)
- 5 wins
  - J.R.H. Mason (a) (1913, 1914, 1918, 1921, 1927)
- 3 wins
  - Lu Liang-Huan (1965, 1974, 1978)
  - Ben Arda (1961, 1963, 1979)
- 2 wins
  - Ian Collier Trotter MacGregor (a) (1919, 1920)
  - Norman Von Nida (1938, 1939)
  - Hsieh Yung-yo (1970, 1977)
  - Lu Hsi-chuen (1980, 1983)
  - Frankie Miñoza (1998, 2007)

== See also ==
- Open golf tournament
