= Manila Southwoods Golf & Country Club =

Golf course in Cavite, Philippines

- Interactive map of Manila Southwoods Golf & Country Club
- 14.322°N 121.044°E

Club information
- Location: Carmona, Cavite
- Established: 1992
- Type: Private
- Owner: The Manila Southwoods Golf & Country Club, Inc.
- Operator: The Manila Southwoods Golf & Country Club, Inc.
- Total holes: 36
- Tournaments: Philippine Open
- Website: www.manilasouthwoods.com

Legends course
- Designed by: Jack Nicklaus
- Par: 72

Masters course
- Designed by: Jack Nicklaus
- Par: 72

The Manila Southwoods Golf & Country Club, Inc. is a golf club golf course in Carmona, Cavite

== History ==
The Fil-Estate Group of Companies of Robert Sobrepeña has been sponsoring basketball, lawn tennis and softball. By 1990, they have been supporting amateur golf and there were already ongoing plans to set a golf facility in Carmona, Cavite.

The venue later named Manila Southwoods Golf and Country Club was meant to complement the Manila Southwoods Residential Estates development of Fil-Estate Properties. Sobrepeña also becamechairman of the golf club. The Legends course opened for play on July 26, 1992; the Masters course opened the following year.

The venue hosted the Philippine Open in several occasions in its initial decade, in 1993, 1994, 1996, and 1999.

The Philippine Open returns to Manila Southwoods in 2025. The Masters course is undergoing renovation ahead of the open tournament in November 2026.

== Courses ==
Manila Southwoods has two golf courses – Masters and Legends both of which was designed by Jack Nicklaus. Each course has 18 holes and 72-par.

== Notable golfers ==
- (Japan) Aguri Iwasaki
- (Philippines) Angelo Que

== Tournaments ==
Manila Southwoods has hosted the Eisenhower Trophy and the Philippine Open.
