= Celestino Tugot =

Filipino professional golfer (1910–2010)

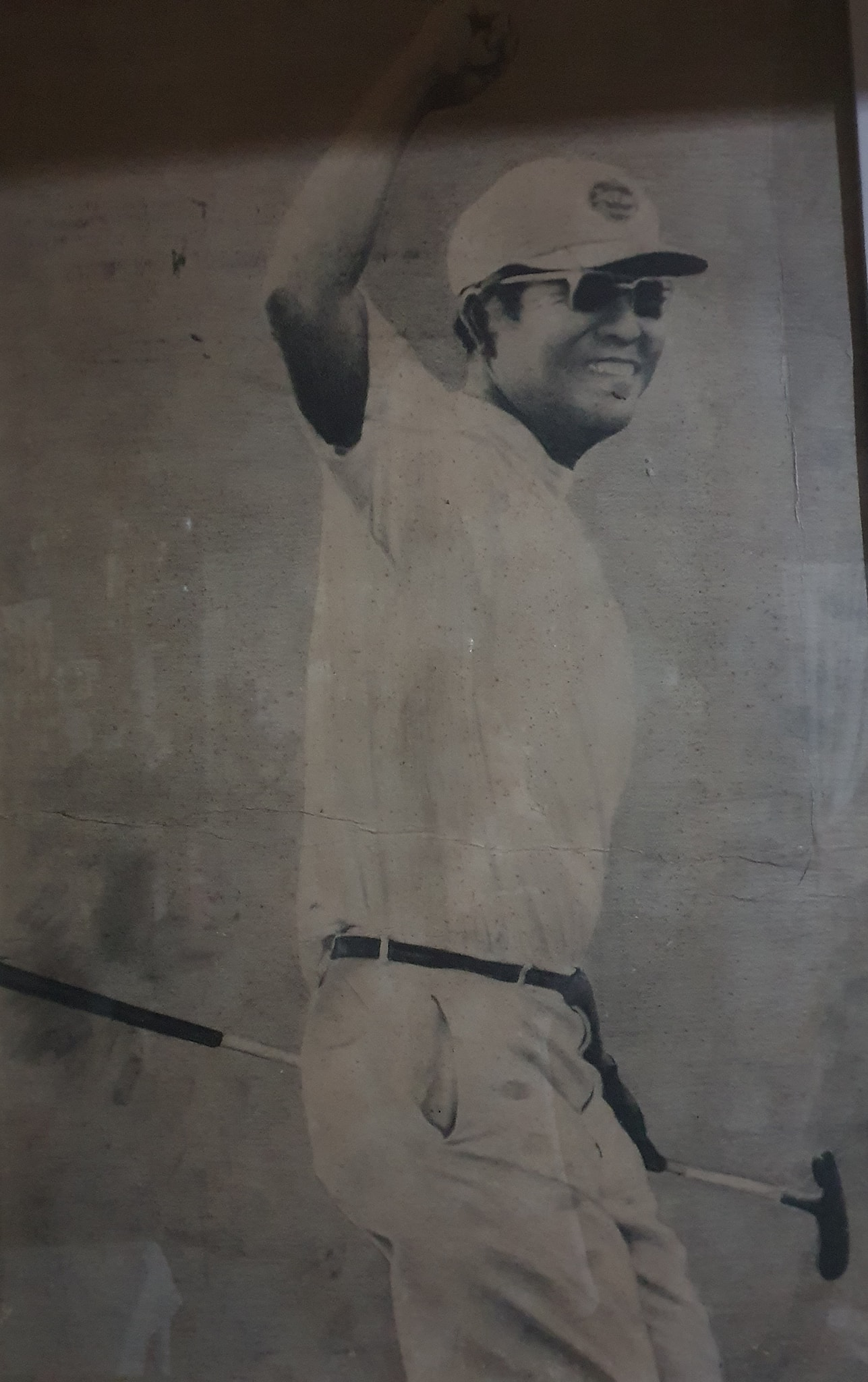
- undated charcoal portrait of Tugot

Personal information
- Nationality: Philippines
- Born: 6 April 1910 Manolo Fortich, Bukidnon, Philippines
- Died: 18 January 2010 (aged 99)

Career
- Sport: Golf
- Status: Professional
- Former tour: Far East Circuit
- Professional wins: 6

Celestino "Tino" Mancao Tugot (6 April 1910 – 18 January 2010) was a Filipino professional golfer. Tugot is widely regarded as one of the best, if not the best golfers the Philippines has produced, and the first Filipino athlete to step into the White House and shake hands with US President Dwight D. Eisenhower in 1954.

== Career ==
Tugot won his national open title six times between 1949 and 1962, including four consecutively from 1955 and represented the Philippines in the World Cup on ten occasions.

=== Del Monte Golf Course ===
The final 9 holes of Del Monte Golf Course which is located in the Del Monte Plantation was designed by Tugot.

=== Our Mother of Perpetual Help Church ===
Upon surviving the sinking of S.S Corregidor in 1941, Tugot and his wife Obdulia built a Catholic church beside their home at Manolo Fortich in the late 1960s. The church continues to spread and inspire devotees and has since become one of the pilgrimage sites of the people of Northern Mindanao and its surrounding areas.

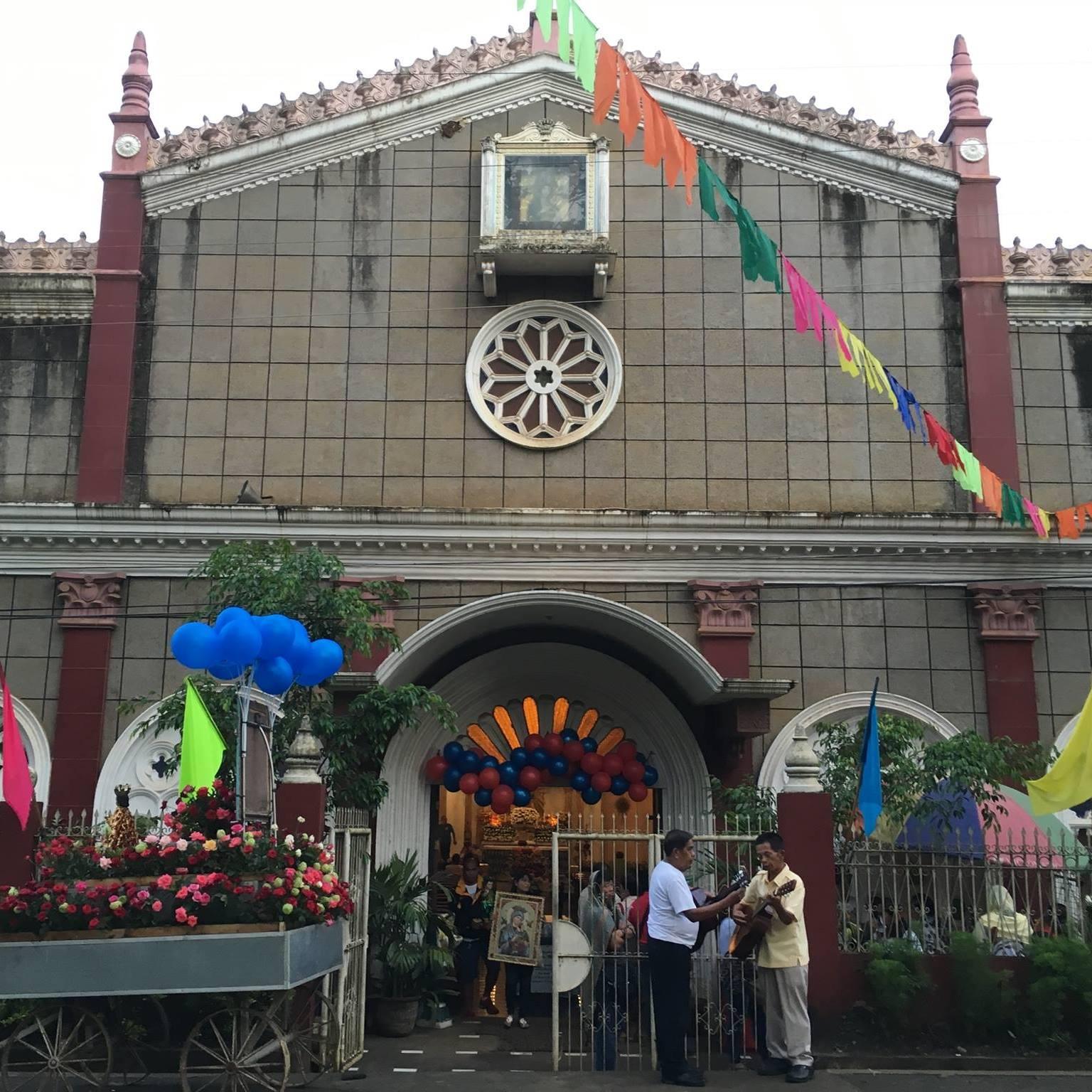
Our Mother of Perpetual Help Church Facade

== Professional wins (6) ==
=== Far East Circuit wins (1) ===
| No. | Date | Tournament | Winning score | Margin of victory | Runner-up |
|---|---|---|---|---|---|
| 1 | 11 Feb 1962 | Philippine Open | −4 (70-73-70-71=284) | 1 stroke | (Australia) Kel Nagle |

=== Other wins (5) ===
This list is incomplete

- 1949 Philippine Open
- 1955 Philippine Open
- 1956 Philippine Open
- 1957 Philippine Open
- 1958 Philippine Open

== Team appearances ==
- World Cup (representing the Philippines): 1954, 1955, 1956, 1957, 1958, 1961, 1962, 1964, 1965, 1967
