= Luisita Golf and Country Club =

Golf course in Tarlac City, Philippines

- Interactive map of Luisita Golf and Country Club
- 15°26′05.9″N 120°37′17.6″E

Club information
- Location: Tarlac City, Philippines
- Type: private
- Owner: Luisita Golf and Country Club, Inc.
- Tota holes: 18
- Tournaments: Philippine Open; Southeast Asian Games
- Greens: Tifdwarf
- Fairways: Tifton 419, partly zoysia and other indigenous grasses
- Designed by: Robert Trent Jones, Sr.
- Par: 72

The Luisita Golf and Country Club is a golf course and country club in San Miguel, Tarlac City, Philippines.

== History ==
The Luisita Golf and Country Club was built within the Hacienda Luisita estate then largely owned by the Cojuangco family in the 1960s commissioning Robert Trent Jones, Sr. for the design. When the estate was acquired by Martin Lorenzo in 2015, Jones' son, Robert Jr. was tasked serve as a consultant as part of the golf course's renovation works which led to the addition of tee boxes.

== Background ==
The Luisita Golf and Country Club's layout was designed by Robert Trent Jones, Sr. The golf course has 18 holes with greens of primarily Tifdwarf and fairways of Tifton 419. However portions of the course's fairways has been overtaken by zoysia and other indigenous grasses. The greens existing in 2018 were originally planted in 1968.

== Tournaments ==
Luista Golf and Country Club hosted the 2015 Philippine Open and the golf events of the 2019 Southeast Asian Games.
