= National Golf Association of the Philippines =

- Sport: Golf
- Abbreviation: NGAP
- Founded: 1961
- Headquarters: PhilSports Complex, Pasig
- President: Al Panlilio
- Chairman: Al Panlilio

Official website
- ngap.ph
- (Philippines)

The National Golf Association of the Philippines (NGAP) is the governing body of golf in the Philippines. The NGAP is a member of the International Golf Federation.

== History ==
The first golf association in the country, the Philippine Amateur Golf Association (PAGA) was formed from the Philippine Amateur Athletic Federation (PAAF), when the PAAF's charter was revised through Republic Act No. 3135 which took effect on June 17, 1961. The PAGA held their first organizational meeting on December 27, 1961.

PAGA later became known as the Republic of the Philippines Golf Association (RPGA) in 1970. It was registered with the Securities and Exchange Commission in 1991 as the National Golf Association of the Philippines.

== Presidents ==
Former

- Martin Lorenzo

== See also ==
- Golf in the Philippines
