= Indian Golf Union =

Governing body of Golf sport in India

- Sport: Golf
- Jurisdiction: India
- Founded: December 1955; 70 years ago
- Affiliation: International Golf Federation
- Affiliation date: 1958
- Regional affiliation: Asia-Pacific Golf Confederation
- Headquarters: 14, Anand Lok August Kranti Marg, New Delhi, New Delhi
- President: Brijinder Singh
- Vice president: Farzan Heerjee
- Secretary: Harish Shetty

Official website
- indiangolfunion.org
- (India)

The Indian Golf Union is the National Sports Federation and the Governing body of the sport of Golf in India alongside Women's Golf Association of India. The Indian Golf Premier League is hosted in partnership with the federation.

== History ==
The Royal Calcutta Golf Club (RCGC), founded in 1829, initially managed all matters related to golf in India. The RCGC instituted several prestigious national golf tournaments. RCGC members decided to establish a new organization in 1955 to facilitate the growth of golf in India beyond the major metropolitan centers, to organize junior level tournaments and to send teams abroad for international events.

The Indian Golf Union was established in December 1955 through an initiative undertaken by some senior golfers in Calcutta and supported by golfers in Delhi, Mumbai and Madras. All administrative powers of the RCGC were transferred to the IGU after the latter's establishment, including the right to conduct the Amateur Golf Championship of India. The RCGC, which had established the tournament, also donated the trophy to the IGU.

== Executives ==
A.D. Vickers served as the first President of the IGU, and Major L.B. Hirst, the Secretary of the RCGC, became the IGU's first Secretary. P.R. Surita was appointed as the first Honorary Secretary of the IGU in 1957. The IGU conducted the All-India Amateur Golf Championship at the Delhi Golf club in 1958, the first time the tournament was held outside Calcutta.

The IGU became affiliated with the International Golf Federation in 1958.

The Union Ministry of Youth Affairs and Sports derecognized the IGU on 1 April 2018 for failure to hold elections and non-compliance with the National Sports Code.
