= Indian Golf Premier League =

Indian golf league

- Current season, competition or edition: 2026 Indian Golf Premier League
- Sport: Golf
- Founded: 2025; 1 year ago
- First season: 2026
- Administrator: Indian Golf Union; Women's Golf Association of India
- Country: India
- Website: IGPL

Indian Golf Premier League, abbreviated as IGPL, is a professional golf league based in India. It is the first franchise-based golf league in the world. The league is in partnership with the Indian Golf Union and the Women's Golf Association of India. It is set to debut in January 2026. Yuvraj Singh was announced as the co-founder and brand ambassador of the league.

== Format ==
Indian Golf Premier League will take place in January 2026 in a six-team, home and away format. It will be played across four weeks and will involve 60 golfers, 10 in each team. Each franchise will have an icon player. There will be a home and away concept for three weeks, which will lead to the grand finale.

The players will be picked from a strategic auction and the franchises will have notional money to build the best team. The league will be played in a no cut, three-day stroke play format.

== See also ==
- Professional Golf Tour of India
- Golf in India
- Sport in India
