= Wack Wack Golf and Country Club =

Golf course and club in Mandaluyong, Philippines

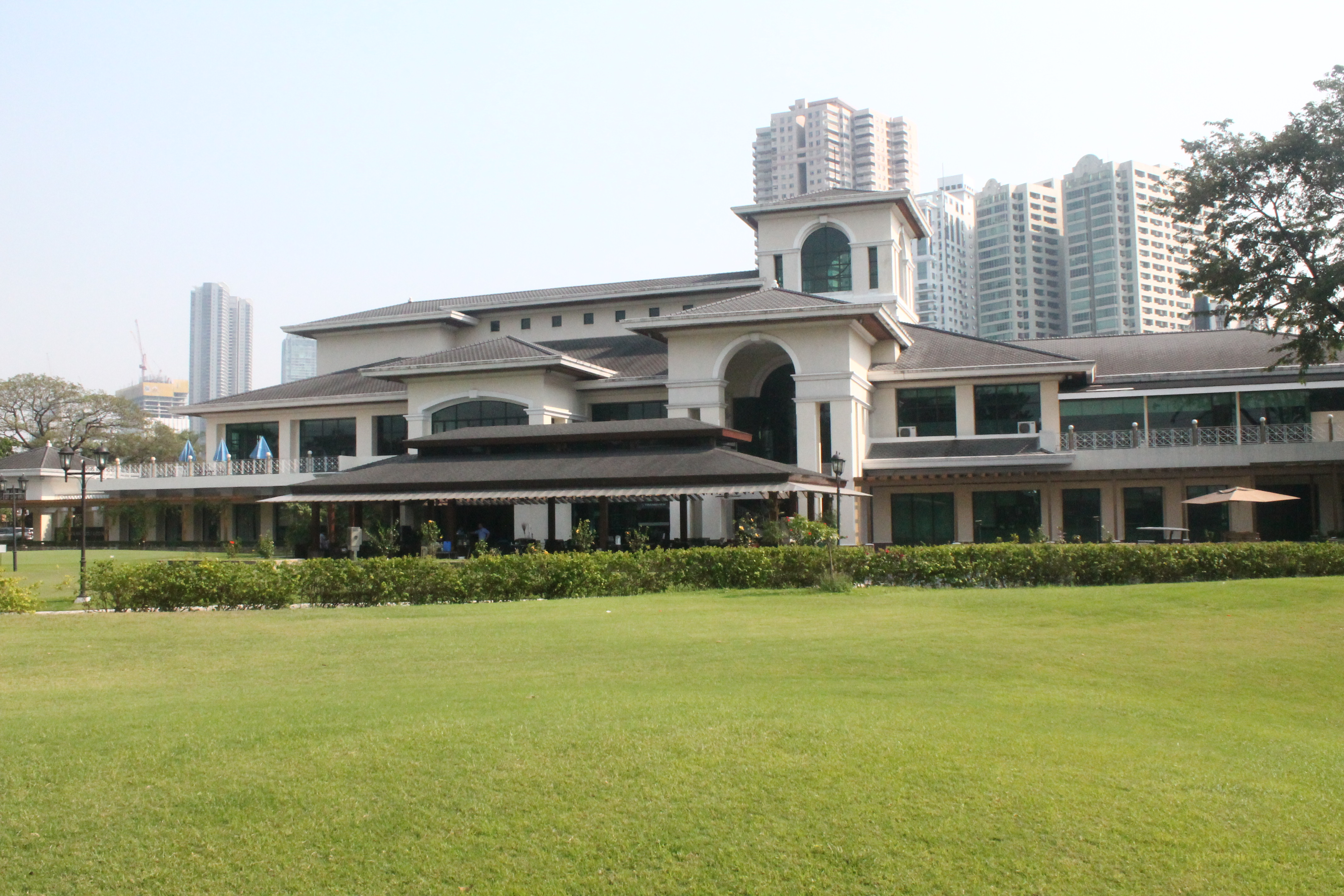
- Wack Wack Golf and Country Club clubhouse
- Interactive map of Wack Wack Golf and Country Club
- 14.59312°N 121.04957°E

Club information
- Location: Mandaluyong, Philippines
- Established: 1930
- Total holes: 36
- Tournaments: Philippine Open, 1977 World Cup
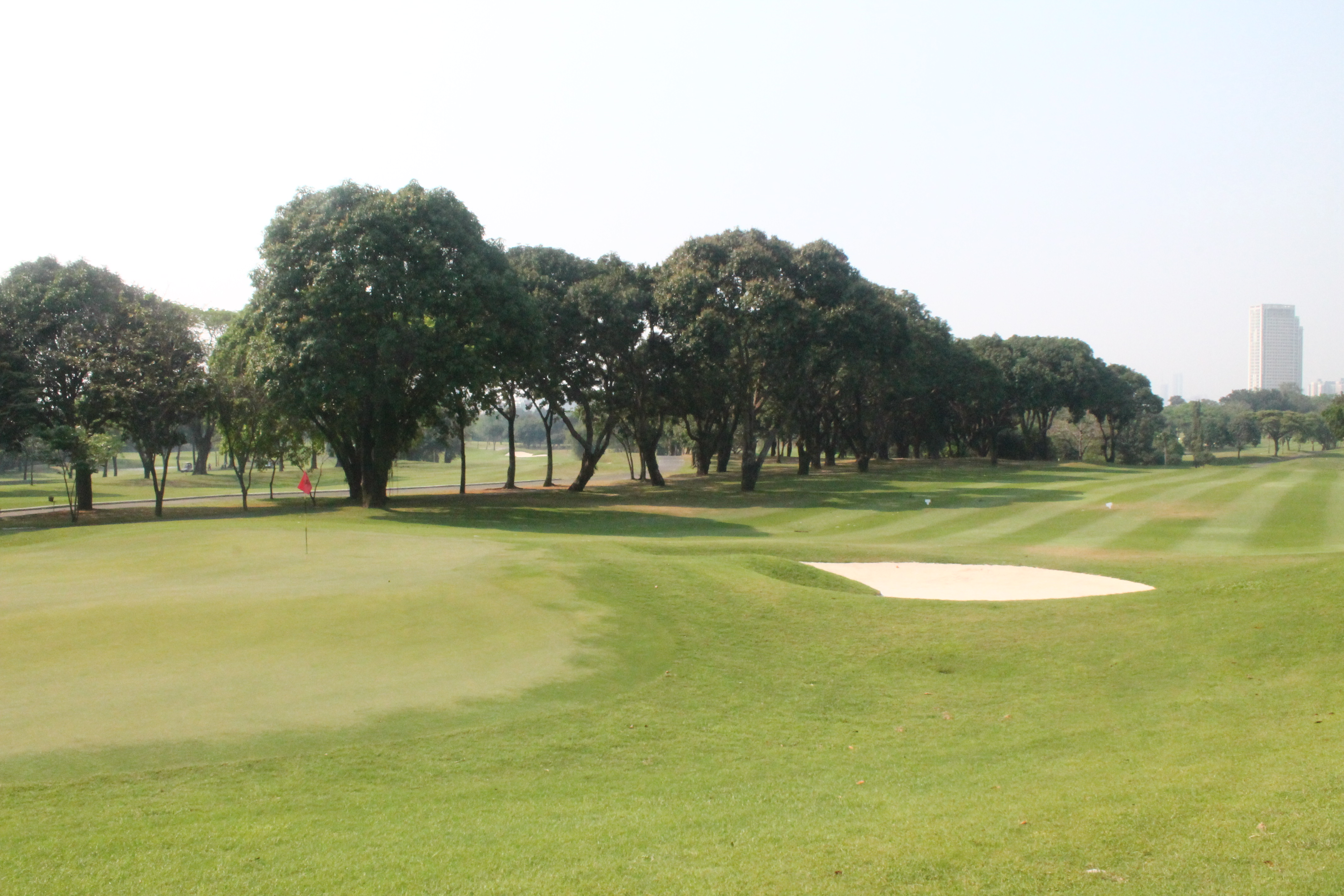

Wack Wack Golf and Country Club is a golf course and country club resort complex located in Mandaluyong, Metro Manila, Philippines.

The complex features two 18-hole championship courses, landscaped terrains, gardens and villas.

== Etymology ==
The Wack Wack Golf and Country Club from "wack wack" which according to legend was the sound made by crows who roamed areas of golf courses. The logo of Wack Wack features two black birds.

== History ==
Wack Wack was founded by William James Shaw in 1930 – because he was disgusted that Larry Montes, a caddie who had won the 1929 Philippine Open tournament (and later many subsequent tournaments) at the Manila Golf Club in Caloocan, Rizal, of which Shaw was a member, had been asked to leave the tournament celebration, by virtue of an alleged rule against the presence of caddies inside the Manila Golf Club. During the American colonial period, exclusive clubs in the Philippines such as the Manila Golf Club, Baguio Country Club, and the Manila Polo Club tend to be reserved only to Americans. Shaw was also ostracized due to his marriage to a Filipino. The discrimination towards Montes and himself, led to Shaw to establish the Wack Wack Golf and Country Club.

It was opened for play in February 1931. The course layout was designed by Jim Black

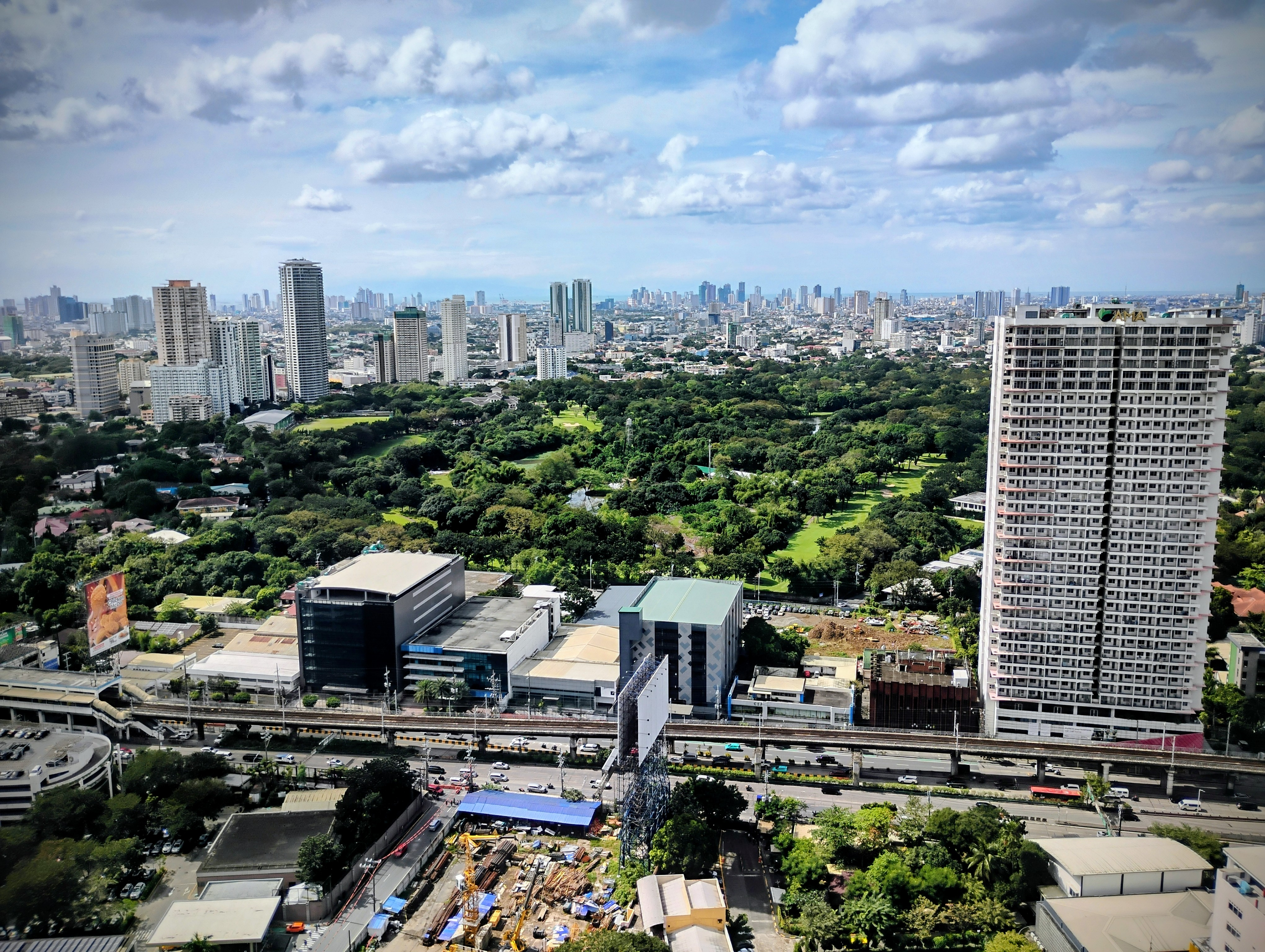
View of the golf course from Ortigas Center

In 1939, the golf course was taken out of Mandaluyong to become part of the newly established Quezon City. However, in 1941, it was returned to Mandaluyong. From 1941 to 1945, the golf course became part of the City of Greater Manila, where Mandaluyong and Quezon City were temporarily merged, falling under Balintawak district, a division of Quezon City.
