= Eliaz =

Eliaz may refer to:

- Dinimutive form of the Hebrew given name Eliazar
- Eliaz Winery, original name of Binyamina Winery, Israel
- Orit Eliaz, birth name of Orit Adato, former Israeli military commander and Israel Prison Service Commissioner
- Eliaz Gabay, CEO of YVEL, a Jewelry company, Jerusalem
- Amir Eliaz, CTO of MagnaCom, American communications company
- Eliaz Kohen, Israeli poet and editor, recipient of the Prime Minister's Prize for Hebrew Literary Works (2006)
- Eliaz, Finnish musician; drummer for the band Private Line
