= Benny Tantoco =

Filipino business executive and ambassador

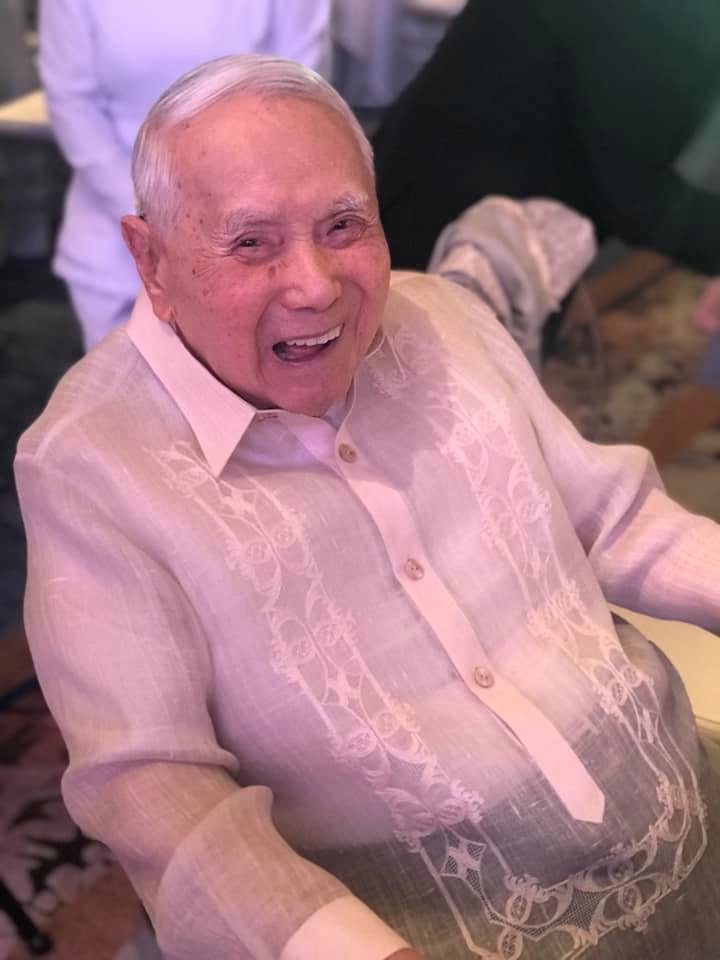
- Tantoco in 2019
- Born: Bienvenido Rufino Tantoco; April 7, 1921
- Died: July 6, 2021 (aged 100)
- Resting place: Manila Memorial Park – Sucat, Paranaque, Philippines
- Occupations: Businessman and diplomat
- Known for: Co-founder of Rustan's with Rustia
- Spouse: Gliceria Rustia (m. 1941; died 1994)
- Children: 7
- Criminal information
- Status: Temporary release; pending appeal (no information on result)
- Criminal charges: Illegal possession of firearms
- Penalty: 3 years of imprisonment

Details
- Date apprehended: August 22, 1986 in Rome
- Imprisoned at: Regina Coeli

Bienvenido Rufino Tantoco Sr. was a Filipino businessman and diplomat who was the founder of the department store chain Rustan's along his wife.

== Early life and education ==
Bienvenido Rufino Tantoco Sr. was born on April 7, 1921. He hails from a clan started by Chinese trader Tan Tok Che. Bienvenido was born to Luis Buendia Tantoco, a farmer and fishing trade based in Malolos, Bulacan and Carmen Fabella Rufino, a music teacher. He was the second eldest of eight children.

Due to the erratic nature of his father's business, Tantoco worked to support his siblings. At 16 years old he began working for a theatre chain in Manila which was run by his relatives. While working, he attended the Jose Rizal College under a scholarship granted by his mother's cousin Vicente Fabella. He obtained a degree in commercial business in 1941 with a thesis entitled "Modern Advertising in the Philippines".

== Business career ==
Tantoco co-founded Rustan's along his wife, Gliceria Rustia It was named after the first three letters of the couple's family names. They started Rustan's in 1952 at their residence in San Marcelino, Manila initially as a showcase of their souvenirs obtained from their trips overseas. It later became a chain of department stores.

His company, Store Specialists Inc. introduced to the Philippines various luxury brands such as Alexander McQueen, Gucci, Givenchy, Prada and Tory Burch .

== Diplomatic career ==
Tantoco was a close associate of former dictator Ferdinand Marcos. He was appointed as Philippine Ambassador to the Holy See presenting his credentials to Pope John Paul II on July 7, 1983. His appointment is part of the Marcos administration to dissuade the Vatican the Philippine Catholic church from supporting the opposition.

For his effort to develop ties between his country and Italy he was conferred the Order of Merit of the Italian Republic in 1978.

He resigned from his position in April 4, 1986 following the ousting of Marcos during the People Power Revolution in February 1986.

== Legal issues ==
=== Arrest in Italy ===
Tantoco was arrested when police found firearms in his villa in Rome on August 22, 1986. He was detained at the Regina Coeli. Tantoco was charged for terrorism but this was reduced to illegal possession of firearms. He was sentenced to three years and prison. He was freed pending appeal.

=== PCCG case ===
The Presidential Commission on Good Government filed a lawsuit in December 1987 in the United States against Ferdinand and Imelda Marcos and ten other people to acquire alleged ill-gotten assets in New York City. Tantoco and his wife were among those accused to have served as dummies in the acquisition of the assets for the Marcos family.

== Death ==
Tantoco died on July 6, 2021 while on a hospital due to pneumonia. He was a centenarian.

== Personal life ==
Bienvenido Tantoco married Gliceria Rusti in April 1941, first meeting her at a bowling place in San Marcelino. His wife was a pianist. They are Roman Catholics and are devotees of the Sacred Heart of Jesus, the Divine Mercy and the Our Lady of Guadalupe. The couple had seven children. His wife died in 1994.

Tantoco lived in Italy as part of his role as an ambassador to the Holy See. He continued living in the ambassador residence in Appian Way after the deposing of Marcos as president during the People Power Revolution. This was after he obtained political refugee status from the United Nations High Commissioner.

In 2019 was among the 50 richest Filipinos by net worth as per Forbes with a worth of US$140 million.
