= Shaw Boulevard =

Highway in Metro Manila, Philippines

Coordinates: 14°35′7″N 121°2′54″E

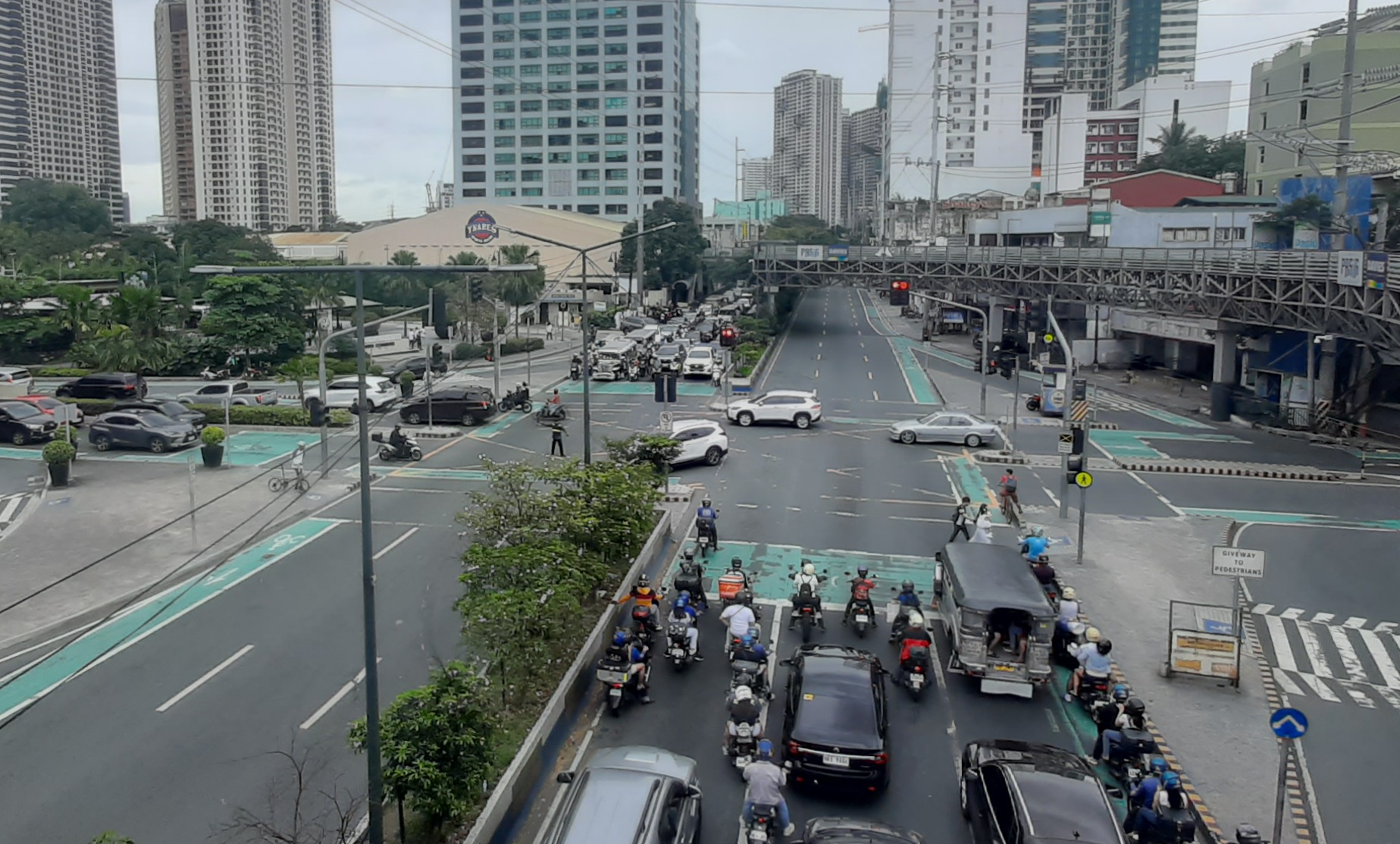
- Shaw Boulevard facing southeast at its intersection with West Capitol Drive in Pasig
- Interactive map of Shaw Boulevard
- Former name(s): Jose Rizal Boulevard; Pasig Boulevard
- Namesake: William James Shaw; José Rizal (previously)
- Maintained by: Department of Public Works and Highways - Metro Manila 1st District Engineering Office
- Length: 5.27 km (3.27 mi)
- Width: Full carriageway 10.0 m (32.8 ft) to 17.4 m (57 ft); Lane width 3.35 m (11.0 ft) to 4.35 m (14.3 ft)
- Component highways: R-5 R-5; N141
- Location: Mandaluyong and Pasig
- West end: Sevilla Bridge at Manila–Mandaluyong boundary
- Major junctions: AH 26 (N1) (EDSA)
- East end: N141 (Pasig Boulevard) / Hillcrest Drive in Pasig

Construction
- Completion: 1960

Shaw Boulevard (formerly known as Jose Rizal Boulevard and Pasig Boulevard) is a 4-8 lane highway connecting the cities of Mandaluyong and Pasig in the Philippines. The boulevard is named after William James Shaw, founder of the Wack Wack Golf and Country Club in Mandaluyong. The road is one of the major thoroughfares of the Ortigas Center in Mandaluyong and Pasig, housing many shopping malls like the Starmall shopping center and Shangri-La Plaza at the EDSA-Shaw intersection and The Marketplace, which is visible from the Kalentong-Shaw intersection and Sevilla Bridge.

It is served by the Shaw Boulevard station of the MRT-3 along its intersection with EDSA. Bus and jeepney routes serve the entirety of the road, going to and from Quiapo, Santa Mesa, José Rizal University, EDSA, Ortigas Center, the Pasig Public Market, and various towns in Rizal.

== Route description ==
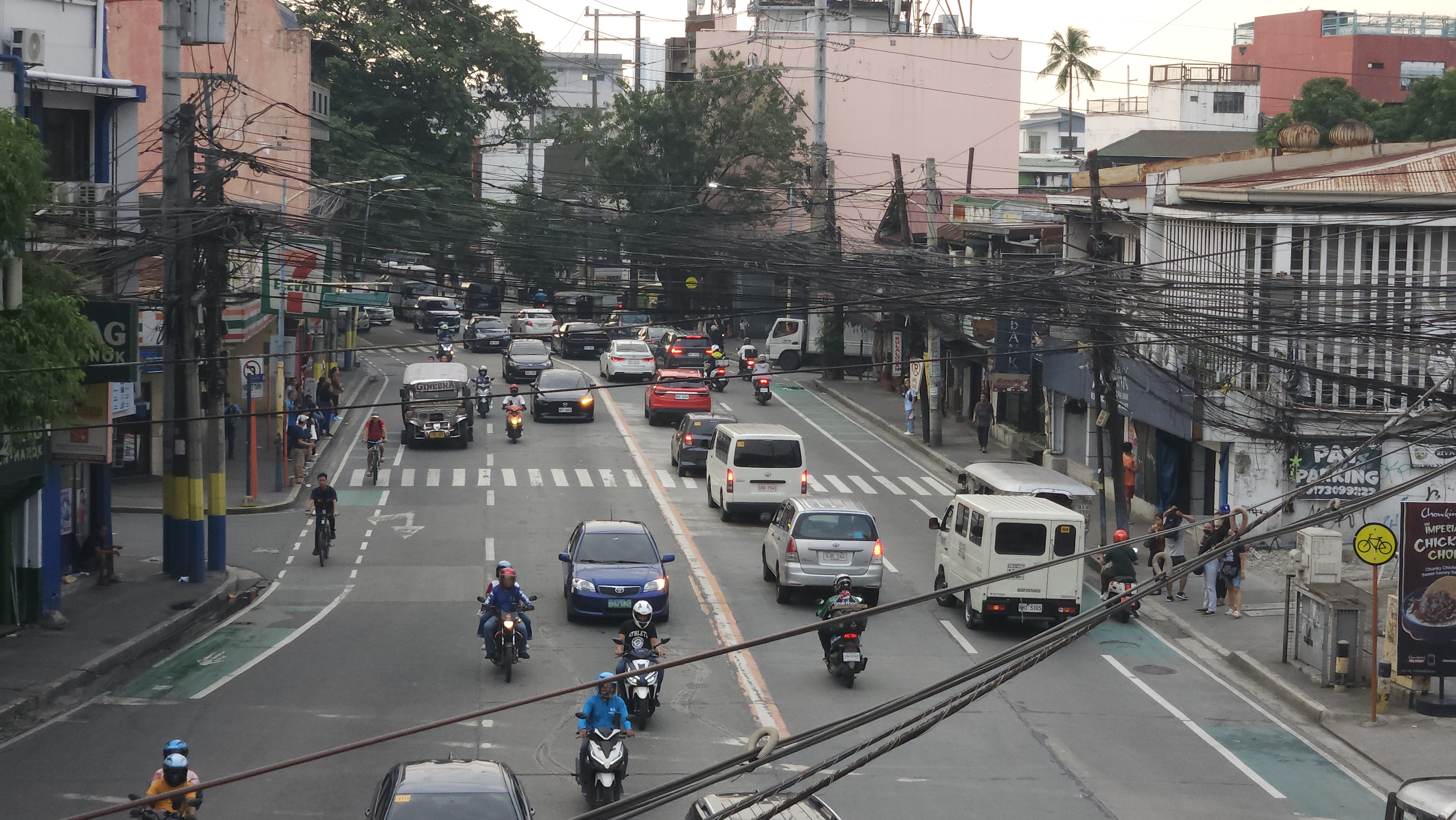
Shaw Boulevard near Acacia Lane in Mandaluyong, facing west

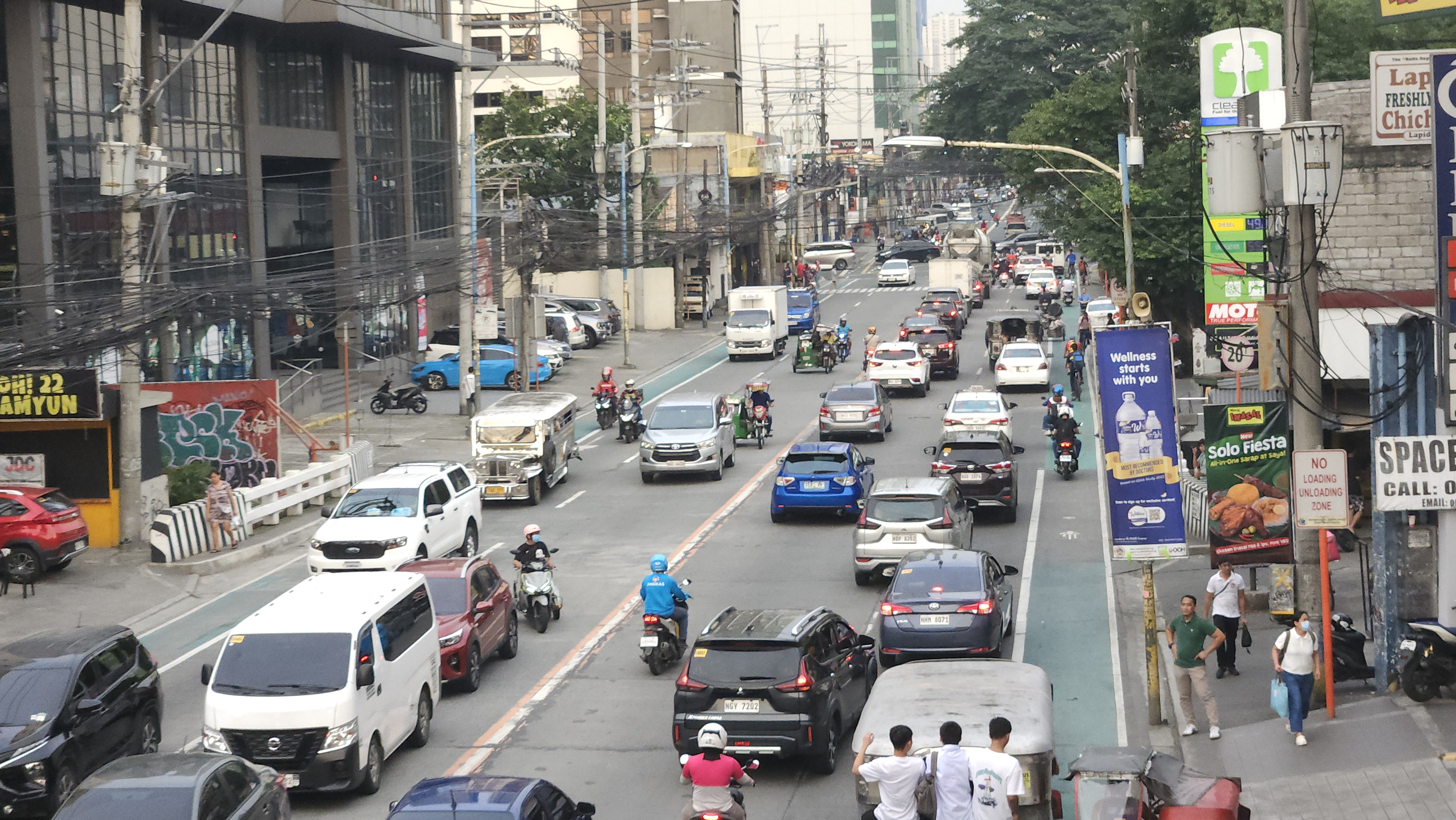
Shaw Boulevard near Acacia Lane in Mandaluyong, facing east

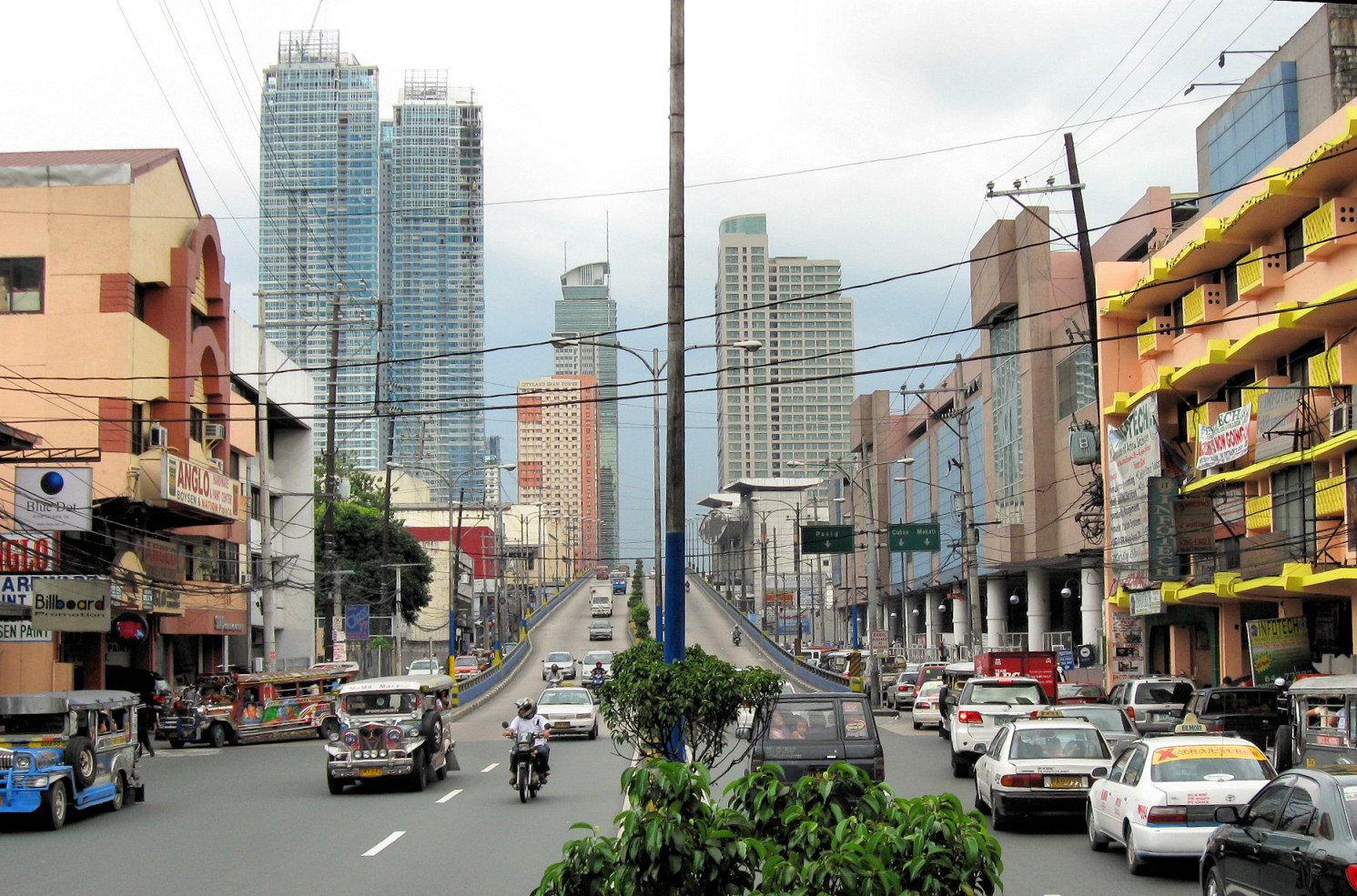
Shaw Boulevard, looking southeast towards the EDSA-Shaw flyover in Mandaluyong

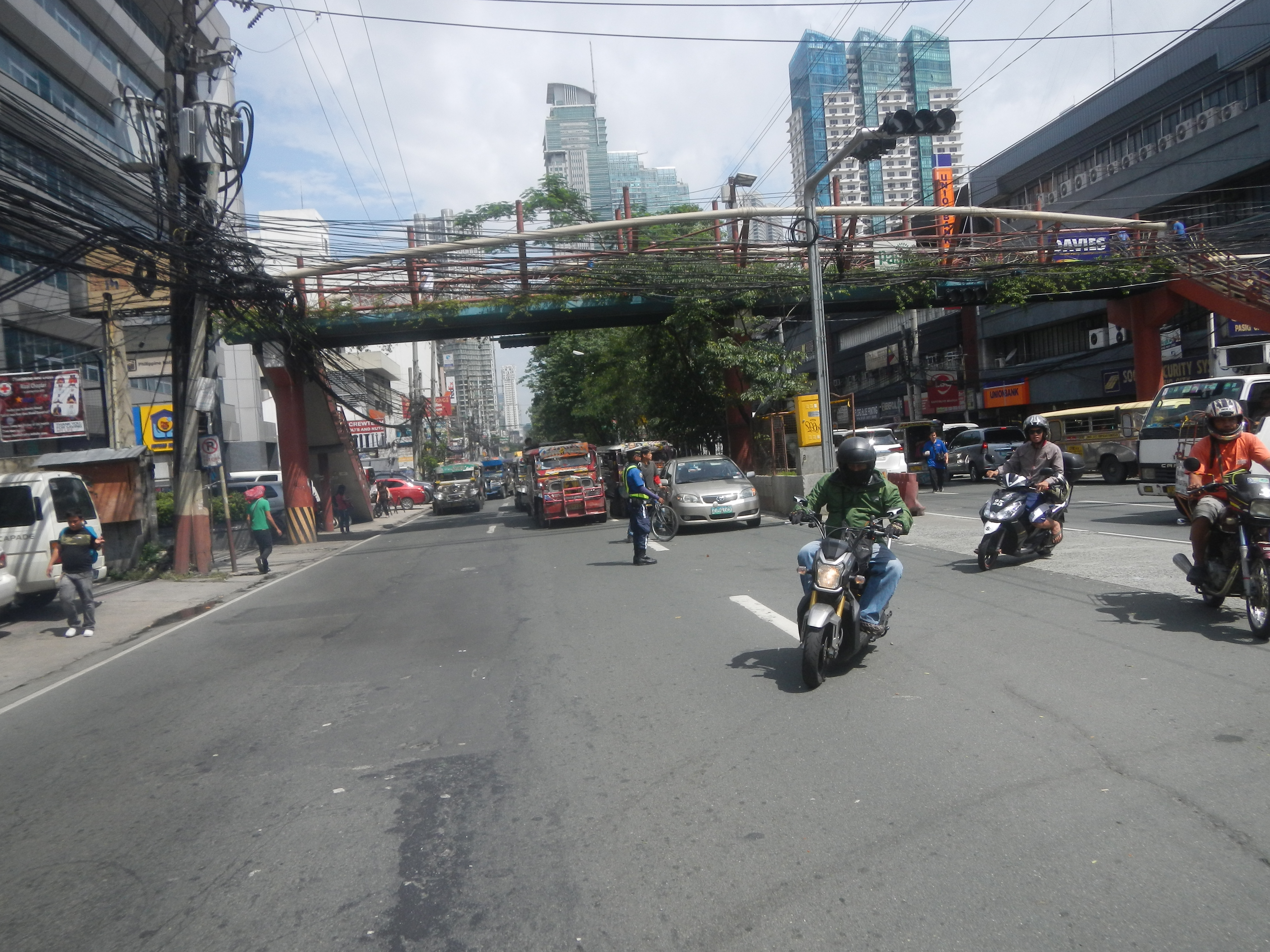
Intersection of Shaw Boulevard and Meralco Avenue in Pasig in 2016

Shaw Boulevard starts as a four-lane road at Sevilla Bridge, which crosses the San Juan River, before coming to an intersection past General Kalentong Street. It is the physical continuation of P. Sanchez Street in Manila. It follows a slightly curved route over Mandaluyong before crossing EDSA; the intersection of the highway with EDSA is commonly called Crossing for this reason. The road expands into four lanes per direction, with two lanes going to the flyover and two lanes passing below. The flyover carries the road over Shaw Boulevard MRT station and descends near EDSA Shangri-La. The road becomes a dual six-lane carriageway east of EDSA and soon enters Pasig. Shaw Boulevard is eventually reduced to a four-lane road, extending to C-5 as Pasig Boulevard.

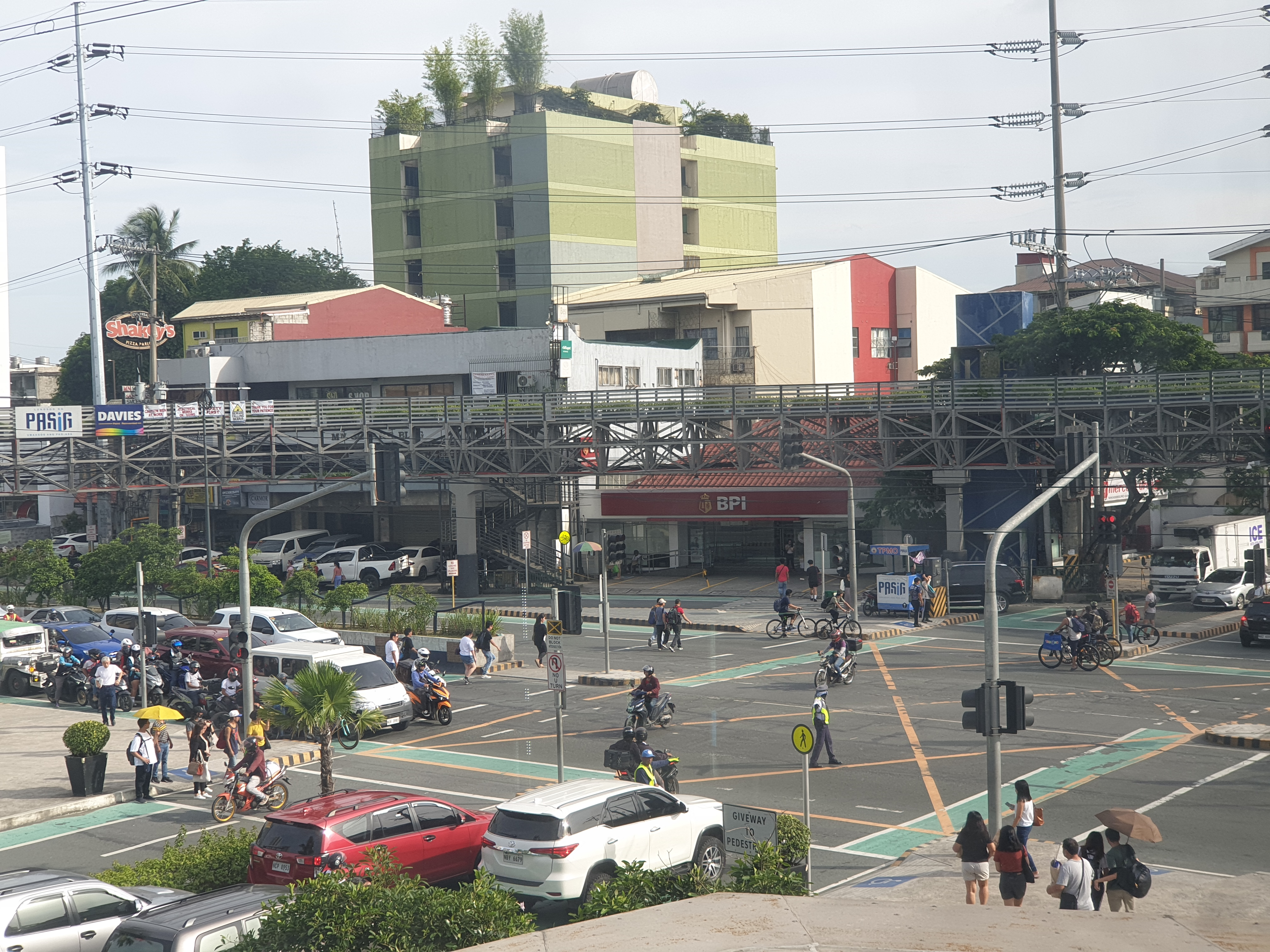
The intersection of Shaw Boulevard, Camino Verde Road, and West Capitol Drive, with bike lanes, bike boxes, and raised pedestrian crossings

The entire span of the road and its continuations from Sevilla Bridge to Pasig Boulevard have Class II paint-separated one-way bike lanes on both sides as part of the Metropolitan Bike Lane Network. The intersection of Shaw Boulevard, West Capitol Drive, and Camino Verde Road has dedicated bike boxes, which were introduced in September 2021.

=== Proposal for the elevated expressway ===
In 2014, under the Roadmap for Transport Infrastructure Development for Metro Manila and Its Surrounding Areas (Region III & Region IV-A; also known as the Metro Manila Dream Plan), the Japan International Cooperation Agency (JICA) study proposes a dual 2-lane elevated expressway from NLEX-SLEX Connector Road (later renamed as NLEX Connector during construction) near Santa Mesa over this highway (R-5) through Pasig to connect with C-5. It was mentioned again in the 2019 follow-up report.

== Landmarks ==
Landmarks are listed from west to east.

=== Mandaluyong ===
- José Rizal University (formerly José Rizal College)
- SM Hypermarket Mandaluyong (formerly Makro Mandaluyong)
- Shaw Center Mall
- Saint John Paul II Mission Station
- SM Center Shaw (formerly Cherry Foodarama Shaw)
- Philippine Charity Sweepstakes Office
- Worldwide Corporate Center
  - Nine Media Corporation (Radio Philippines Network, RPTV)
  - Southern Broadcasting Network (free-to-air television network of Solar Entertainment)
- Starmall EDSA Shaw (formerly Manuela Complex)
- Shaw Boulevard station (MRT-3)
- Shangri-La Plaza
  - Rustan's (formerly known as Crossings Department Store)
- Greenfield District
- Lourdes School of Mandaluyong

=== Pasig ===
- Shaw Boulevard station (Metro Manila Subway)
- Capitol Commons
- Ynares Sports Arena
- Citystate Centre
  - Aliw Broadcasting Corporation

== Public transportation ==
=== Jeepney routes ===
- Pasig - Quiapo
- EDSA/Shaw - Morong (T256)
- EDSA/Shaw - Tanay (T257)
- EDSA/Shaw - Binangonan (T258)
- EDSA/Shaw - Pasig (T295)
- EDSA/Shaw - Pateros (T279)
- EDSA/Shaw - Tipas (T236)
- EDSA/Shaw - Taytay (T297)
- EDSA/Shaw - Antipolo (T298)
- EDSA/Shaw - Kalentong/JRU (T347)

=== UV Express routes ===
- Pasig - Quiapo (N63)
- Quiapo - SM Megamall (N65)
- Binangonan - Starmall Shaw (N72)
- Taytay - Starmall Shaw (N74)

=== Rail stations ===
- Shaw Boulevard station (MRT Line 3)
- Shaw Boulevard station (Metro Manila Subway, under construction)

== Intersections ==
Province	City/Municipality	km	mi	Destinations	Notes
San Juan River		7	4.3	Sevilla Bridge	
Mandaluyong				Haig Street	Westbound only
Mandaluyong				General Kalentong Street	Traffic light intersection; leads to San Juan to the northeast and Santa Ana, Manila to the southwest. No left turn from eastbound.
Mandaluyong				J. Tiosejo Street	One-way road
Mandaluyong				F. Bernardo Street	One-way road
Mandaluyong				E. Magalona Street / V. Fabella Street	One-way roads
Mandaluyong				A.V. Fabella Street	
Mandaluyong				Lawson Street	
Mandaluyong				San Clemente Street	
Mandaluyong				J.B. Vargas Street	
Mandaluyong				E. Jacinto Street	
Mandaluyong				Pinagtipunan Street	
Mandaluyong		8	5.0	J. Luna Street	
Mandaluyong				29 de Agosto Street	
Mandaluyong				L. Gonzales Street / M. Yulo Street	
Mandaluyong				L. Cruz Street	
Mandaluyong				Araullo Street	Provides access to San Juan
Mandaluyong				R. Vicencio Street / Guerrero Street	
Mandaluyong				A. Bonifacio Street	
Mandaluyong				Acacia Lane	Traffic light intersection; part of Mabuhay Lane Route 1
Maytunas Creek				Maligaya Bridge	
Mandaluyong				Gomezville Street / 9 de Pebrero Street	Traffic light intersection; northbound goes to San Juan, southbound goes to Maysilo Circle, Poblacion, Makati via Makati-Mandaluyong Bridge and Estrella–Pantaleon Bridge
Mandaluyong				Balagtas Street	One-way road
Mandaluyong				Luna Mencias Street	Provides access to San Juan; part of Mabuhay Lane Routes 1 and 4
Mandaluyong				Torres Street / Jaime Cardinal Sin Street	
Mandaluyong				Calderon Street	
Mandaluyong		9	5.6	Pilar Street	One way road towards Shaw Boulevard from San Juan
Mandaluyong				A. Mabini Street	One way road from Shaw Boulevard; provides access to San Juan; part of Mabuhay Lane Route 7
Mandaluyong				Ideal Street	
Mandaluyong				S. Laurel Street	One way road towards Shaw Boulevard
Mandaluyong				Lee Street / Old Wack-Wack Road	Traffic light intersection. Lee Street is one-way from Shaw Boulevard. Old Wack-Wack Road is one-way to Shaw Boulevard until it crosses the road, becoming two-way towards Wack-Wack Village.
Mandaluyong				Princeton Street	Emergency gate for Wack-Wack Village. Eastbound side only.
Mandaluyong		10	6.2	Samat Street	Eastbound side only. Last intersection on the eastbound direction before the EDSA flyover.
Mandaluyong		10	6.2	Stanford Street	Emergency gate for Wack-Wack Village. Eastbound side only.
Mandaluyong				West end of EDSA-Shaw Flyover	
Mandaluyong				Yale Street	Emergency gate for Wack-Wack Village. Westbound side only.
Mandaluyong				Harvard Street	Access for Wack-Wack Village. Westbound side only.
Mandaluyong				AH 26 (N1) (EDSA) – Cubao, Makati	Traffic light intersection
Mandaluyong				Sto. Cristo Street	Eastbound service road only; one-way road
Mandaluyong				Mayflower Street	Eastbound service road only; provides access to Greenfield District; last intersection on the westbound direction before the EDSA flyover
Mandaluyong				East end of EDSA-Shaw Flyover	
Mandaluyong				St. Francis Street	Westbound direction only; provides access to Ortigas Center
Buayang Bato Creek					
Mandaluyong–Pasig boundary		11	6.8	Sheridan Street / San Miguel Avenue	Traffic light intersection; northbound goes to Ortigas Center, southbound goes to Greenfield District
Pasig				Escriva Drive	Westbound only; provides access to Ortigas Center
Pasig				Pioneer Street / General Roxas Street	Traffic light intersection
Pasig		11.5	7.1	Meralco Avenue	Traffic light intersection; provides access to Capitol Commons and Ortigas Avenue. Closed until 2028 for the construction of Metro Manila Subway.
Pasig				Camino Verde Road / West Capitol Drive	Traffic light intersection. Capitol Commons service road. Provides access to the Kapitolyo district in Pasig.
Pasig				Oranbo Drive	Westbound only.
Pasig		12	7.5	San Roque Street / Canley Road (Danny Floro Street)	Traffic light intersection
Pasig		12	7.5	N141 (Pasig Boulevard) / Hillcrest Drive	Eastern terminus; right turn only from Shaw Boulevard.
1.000 mi = 1.609 km; 1.000 km = 0.621 mi: Closed/former; Incomplete access
