= Yvel =

Yvel may refer to:

- Gilbert Yvel (born 1976), Dutch martial artist
- Yvel (river), French river
- YVEL, Israeli company
- Yveltal, Legendary Pokémon
