= Shangri-La Plaza =

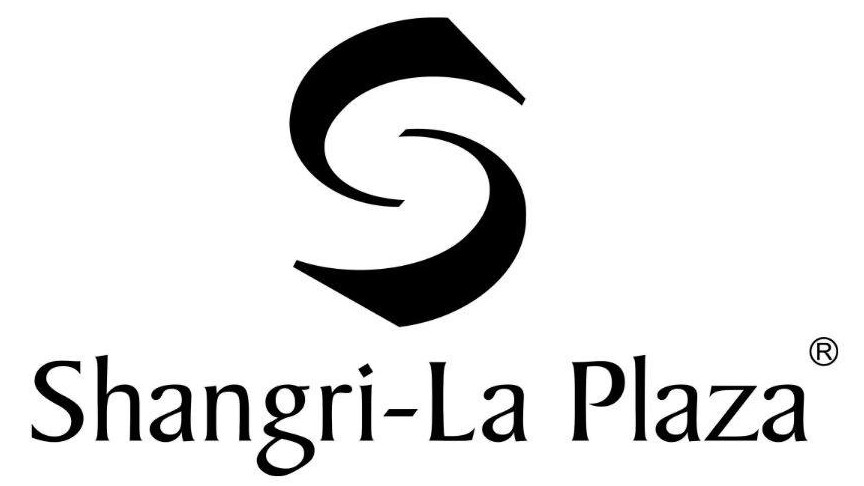

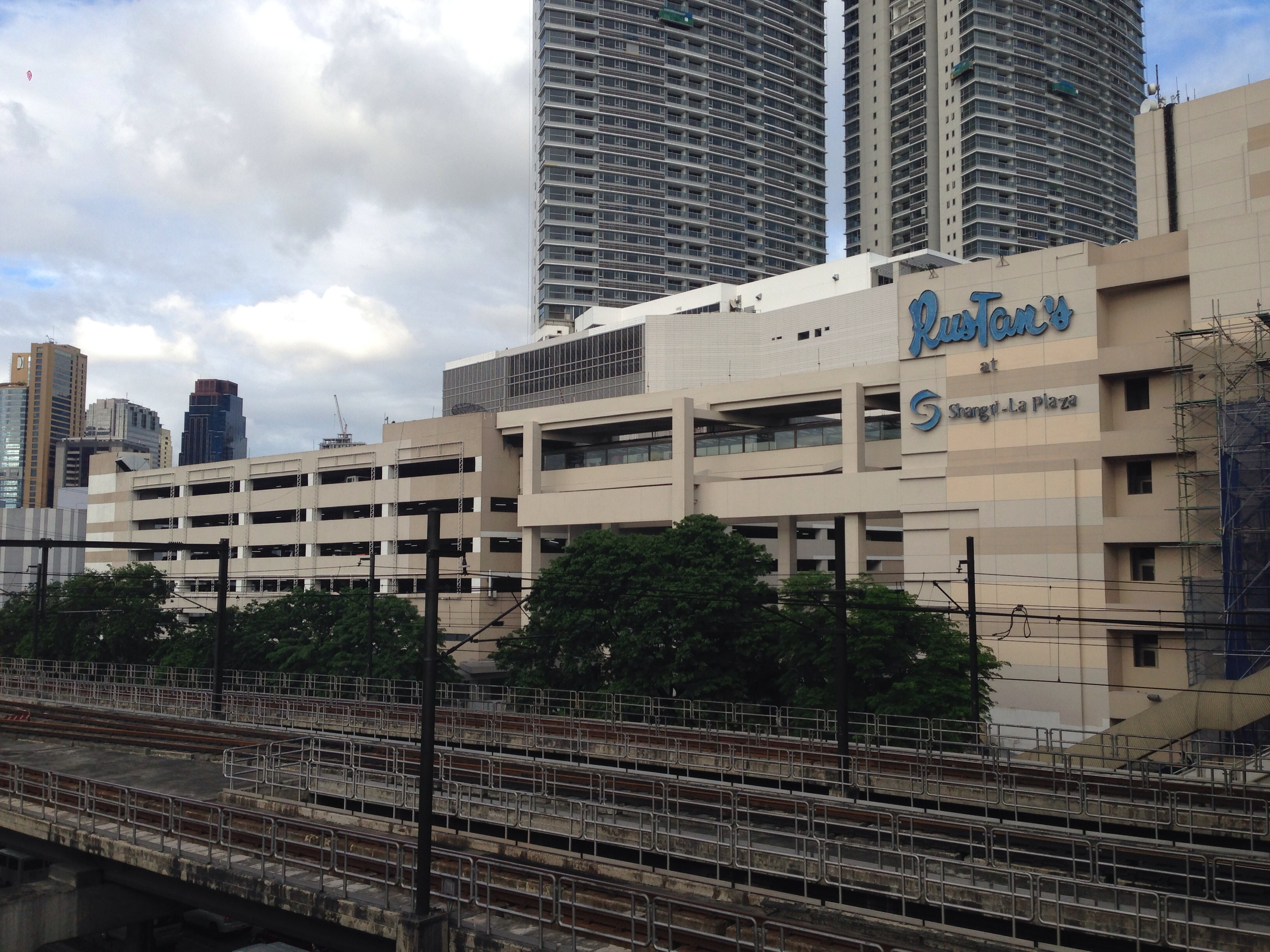
- Shangri-La Plaza along EDSA
- Location: Mandaluyong, Philippines
- Coordinates: 14°34′52.2″N 121°03′18.2″E
- Address: EDSA corner Shaw Boulevard, Wack-Wack Greenhills, Ortigas Center
- Opened: November 21, 1991; 34 years ago
- Developer: EDSA Properties Holdings Inc. Kuok Group of Companies
- Manager: Kuok Philippine Properties, Inc.
- Owner: Kuok Group of Companies
- Num. of stores: More than 300 shops and restaurants
- Num. of anchor tenants: 9
- Floor area: 175,000 m^{2} (1,880,000 sq ft)
- Floors: Main Mall: 9 floors (6 retail floors, 2 carpark levels, 1 basement) East Wing: 6 floors + 2 basement carpark levels North Wing: 10+ floors
- Public transit: YL07 Shaw Boulevard
- Website: www.shangrila-plaza.com

Shangri-La Plaza is a shopping mall located in Ortigas Center, Mandaluyong, Philippines. It is owned and operated by the Kuok Group of Companies, the owner of the worldwide chain of Shangri-La Hotels and Resorts. Shangri-La Plaza opened on November 21, 1991, and contains more than 300 shops and restaurants.

== Location ==
Shangri-La Plaza is located along the corner of Shaw Boulevard and Epifanio de los Santos Avenue, Barangay Wack-Wack Greenhills East, Mandaluyong. It is adjacent and directly connected to other Shangri-La properties such as Edsa Shangri-La, Manila, The St. Francis Shangri-La Place, and One Shangri-La Place. It is also near other shopping centers such as SM Megamall and Starmall EDSA-Shaw and across the Greenfield District.

== Physical details ==
=== Main Wing ===
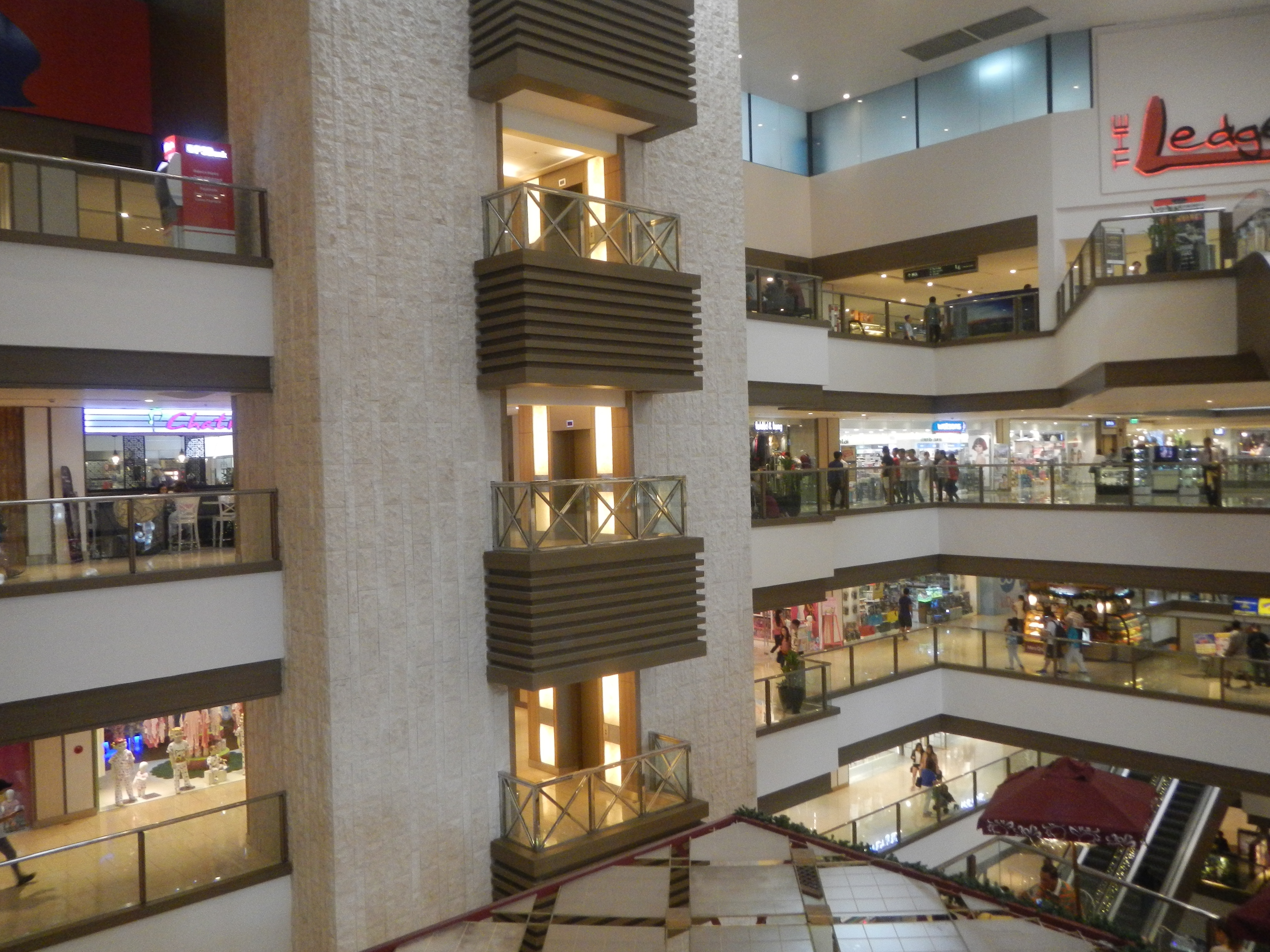
Main Wing interior

Opened in 1991, the Main Wing of the mall has 6 retail floors, 1 basement level of shops and restaurants, and 2 carpark levels above the retail floors. The Food Forum (formerly called Garden Court) is located in the mall's basement level, featuring several food stalls and fast food chains, as well as a few other restaurant chains. Also located at the basement level are The Marketplace (formerly called Rustan's Fresh Supermarket and Marketplace by Rustan's) and the Technohub. The second floor of the main wing serves as an atrium to the other four floors above it, wherein its open space is often used for events. There are also escalators in the main wing's atrium that skip odd-numbered floors, allowing faster access to the 2nd, 4th, and 6th floors.

The Ledge is a portion of the sixth floor of the main mall where various international and local restaurant chains can be found. Streetscape is an al fresco area with various local and international restaurant chains as well. Another retail zone named The Fifth, located at the fifth level, caters to a young retail market and beside it is the health and wellness zone. The Red Carpet, formerly called the Shang Cineplex until its 2018 renovation, is located on the sixth and seventh levels, featuring four regular movie theaters and one Premiere theater.

The main mall is directly connected to the Shaw Boulevard MRT Station, Edsa Shangri-La, Manila hotel and The St. Francis Shangri-La Place. Indirectly, it is also connected to Starmall EDSA-Shaw and the Greenfield District through the walkways of the MRT-3 station.

==== Rustan's Department Store ====
Located at the Main Wing, Rustan's Department Store is a 4-level high-end department store.

=== East Wing ===
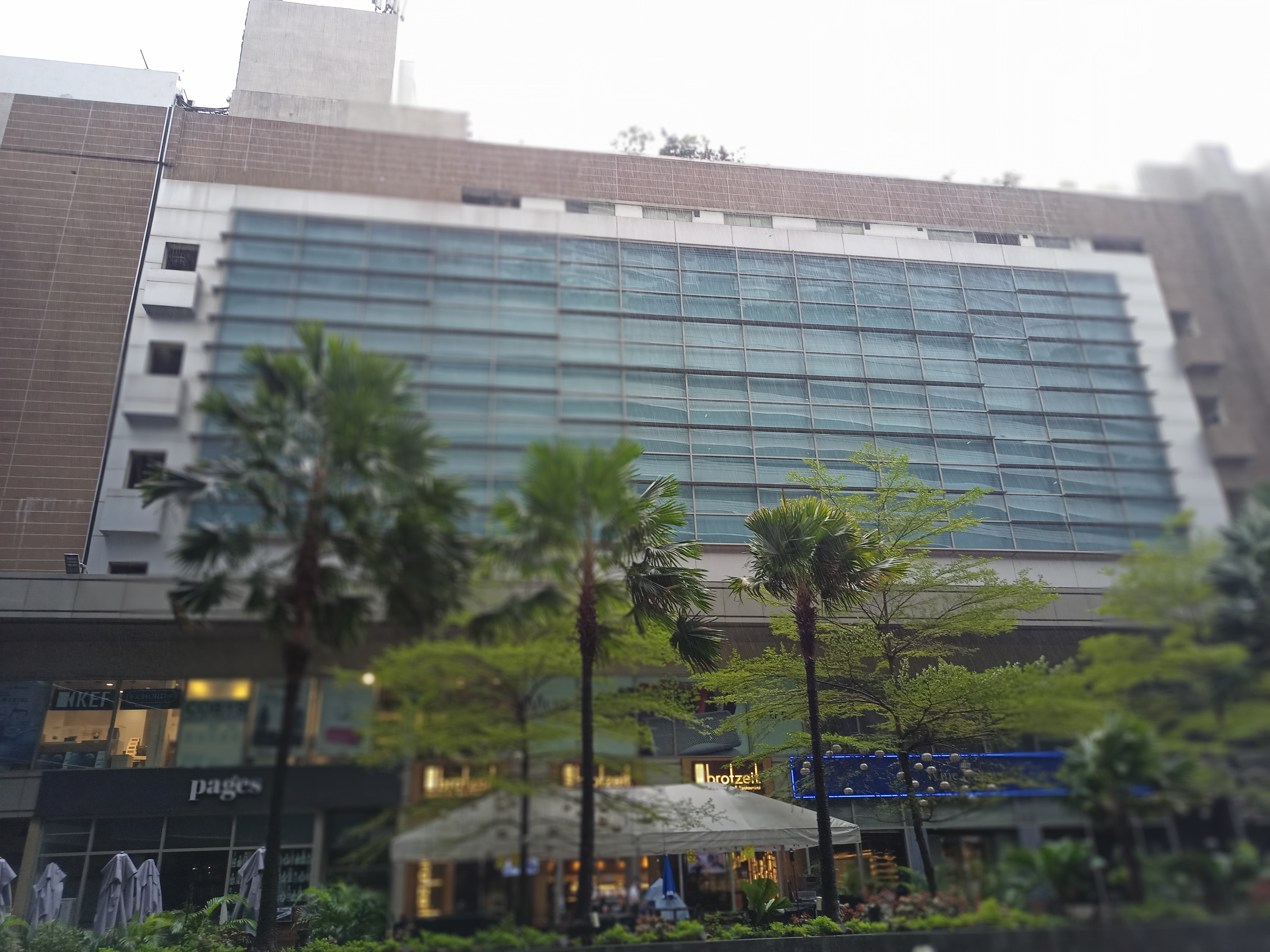
East Wing exterior

The East Wing was opened in 2013 and has 5 floors and 1 basement level of shops and restaurants. The East Wing also serves as the podium to One Shangri-La Place, a two-tower residential development. It was built on what was the open parking area of the complex. It features some more upscale and international brands as well as various restaurants. It is connected to the Main Mall via bridgeways which also feature various restaurant and retail chains.

=== North Wing ===
Also known as the multi-deck parking area, it has connections to the Main Mall and East Wing. It also has bars and restaurants as well as a salon and a small retail strip facing EDSA that is composed of service shops, banks, a drugstore and some snack options.

=== Chapel ===
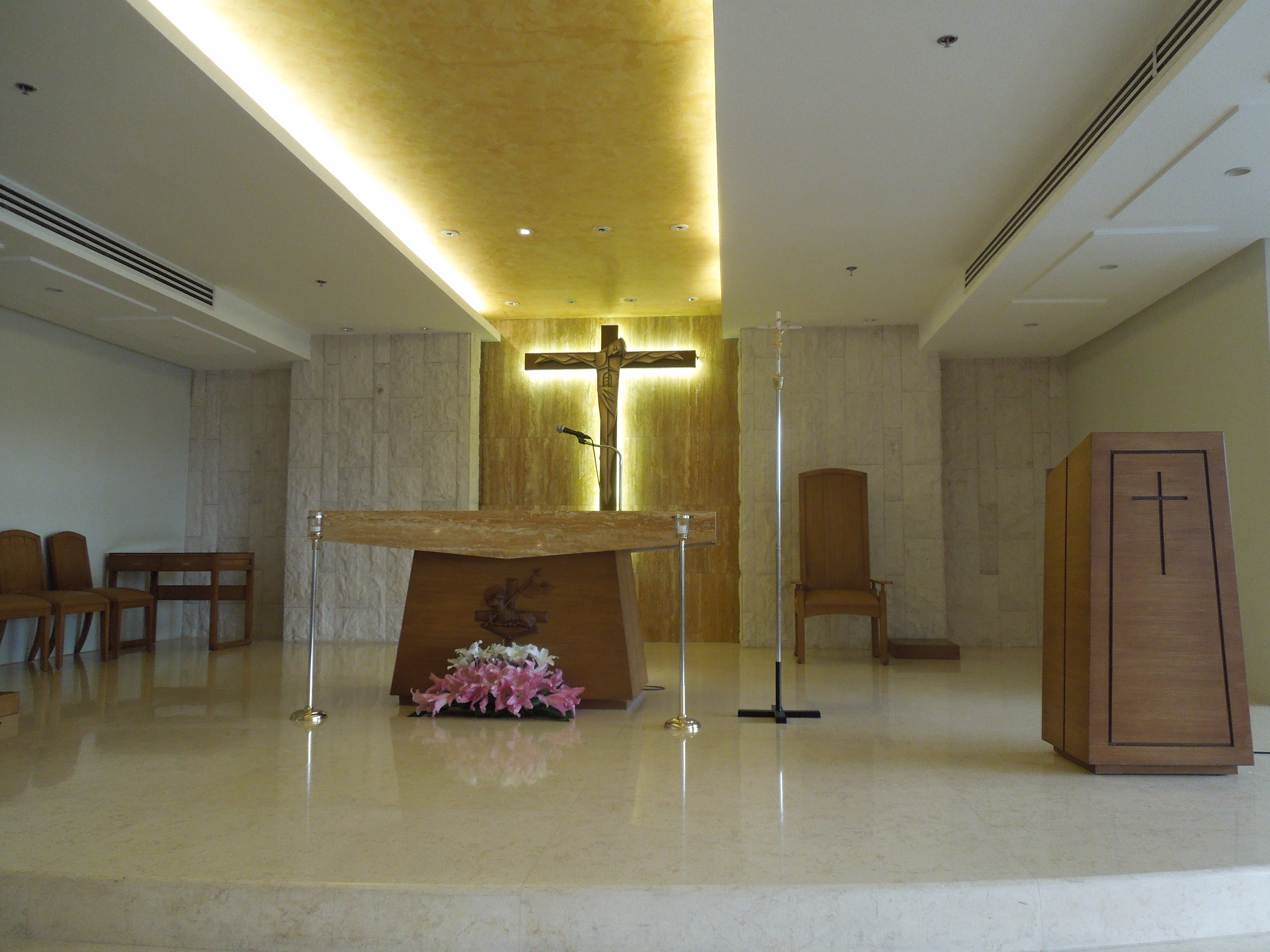
Altar at St. Padre Pio Chapel

The St. Padre Pio Chapel is a Roman Catholic chapel at the 6th level of the mall and can be accessed from the 5th level via escalators and from a hallway connecting to the main mall area of the same level.
