= José Rizal University =

Private university in Mandaluyong, Philippines

- Pamantasang José Rizal (Filipino)
- Former names: Far Eastern College (1919–1922); José Rizal College (1922–2000)
- Motto: Find your inner hero
- Type: Private, nonsectarian coeducational basic and higher education institution
- Established: 1919; 107 years ago
- Founders: Vicente F. Fabella, CPA
- Academic affiliations: ASAIHL PACUCOA
- President: Vicente K. Fabella, MBA, Ph.D.
- Vice-president: List: Miguel M. Carpio (VP for Academic Affairs); Augusto K. Fabella (VP for Quality, Linkages & Technology Enabled Learning); Edna Cia-Cruz (VP for Information Systems); Theodore U. Calaguas (VP for Financial Affairs); Norma M. Montalvo (VP for Administrative Affairs)
- Principal: Ma. Claire M. Guevara (Elementary School); Grace Marie B. Martin (Junior High School); Maria Theresa B. Bonus (Senior High School)
- Location: No. 80 corner Shaw Boulevard and Kalentong St. Mandaluyong, Metro Manila, Philippines; 14°35′33″N 121°01′43″E
- Campus: Urban Main Campus: Mandaluyong, Metro Manila Satellite Campus: Lipa City, Batangas
- Alma Mater song: Himno Jose Rizal
- Colors: Blue and Gold
- Nickname: Rizalians
- Sporting affiliations: NCAA (Philippines)
- Website: www.jru.edu
- Location in Metro Manila Location in Luzon Location in the Philippines

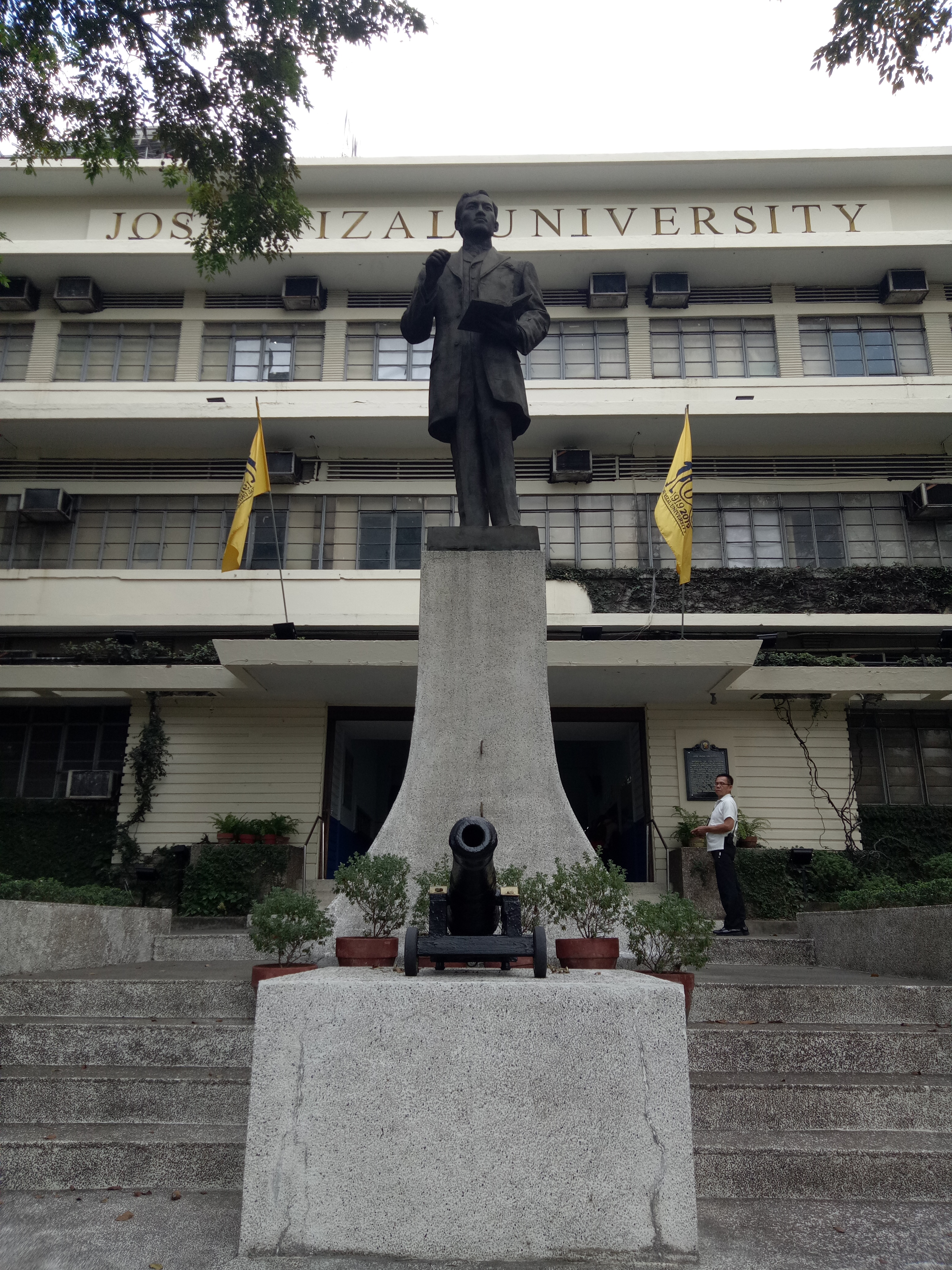
Facade of the university

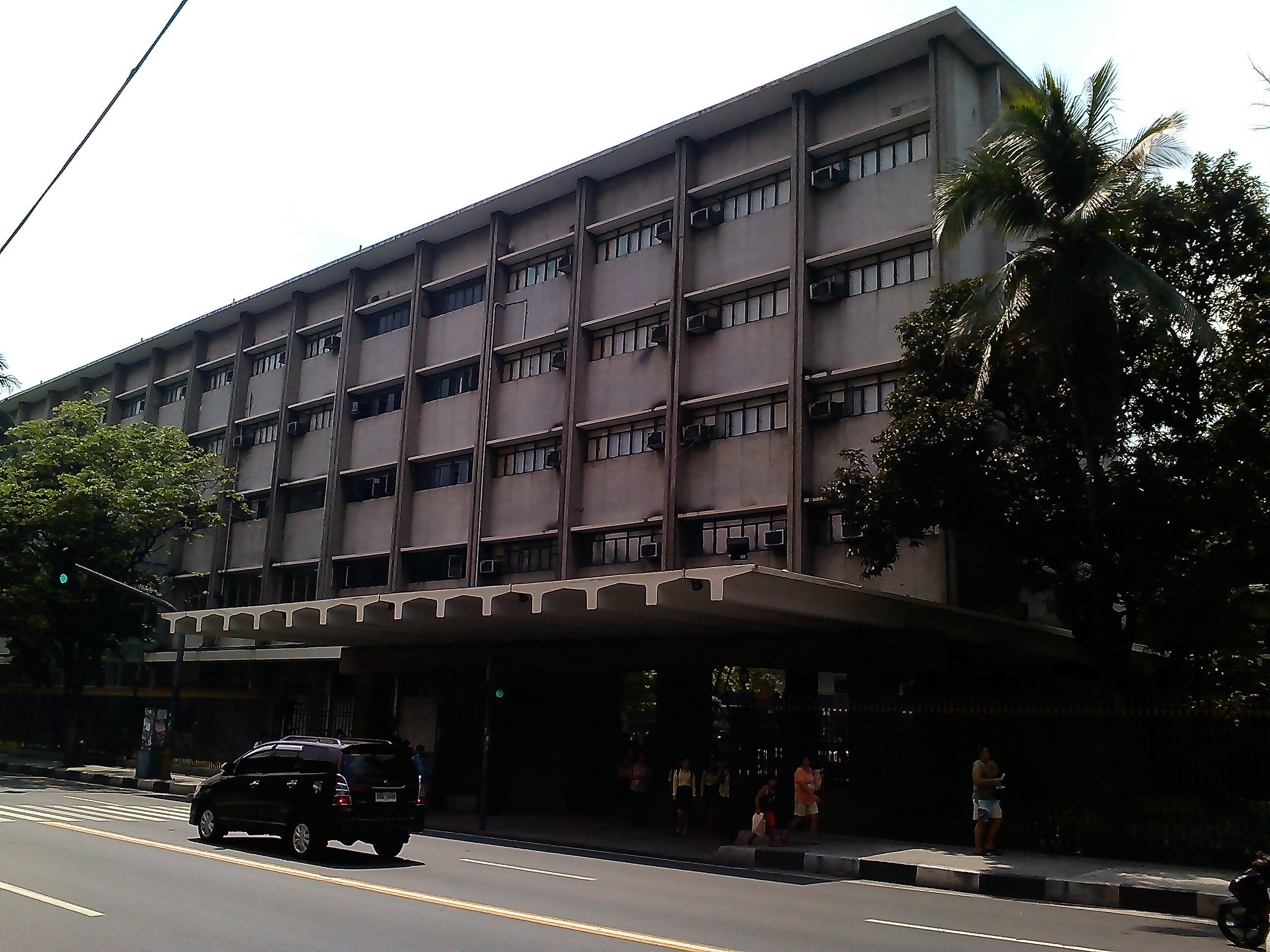
The JRU Campus

José Rizal University (formerly José Rizal College or JRC), also referred to by its acronym JRU, is a private non-sectarian, non-stock coeducational basic and higher education institution located in Mandaluyong, Metro Manila, Philippines. It was founded in 1919 by Vicente F. Fabella, the Philippines' first certified accountant. José Rizal University is one of the schools situated in the east side of Mandaluyong, the others being the Plaridel Campus of Arellano University and Don Bosco Technical College.

== History ==
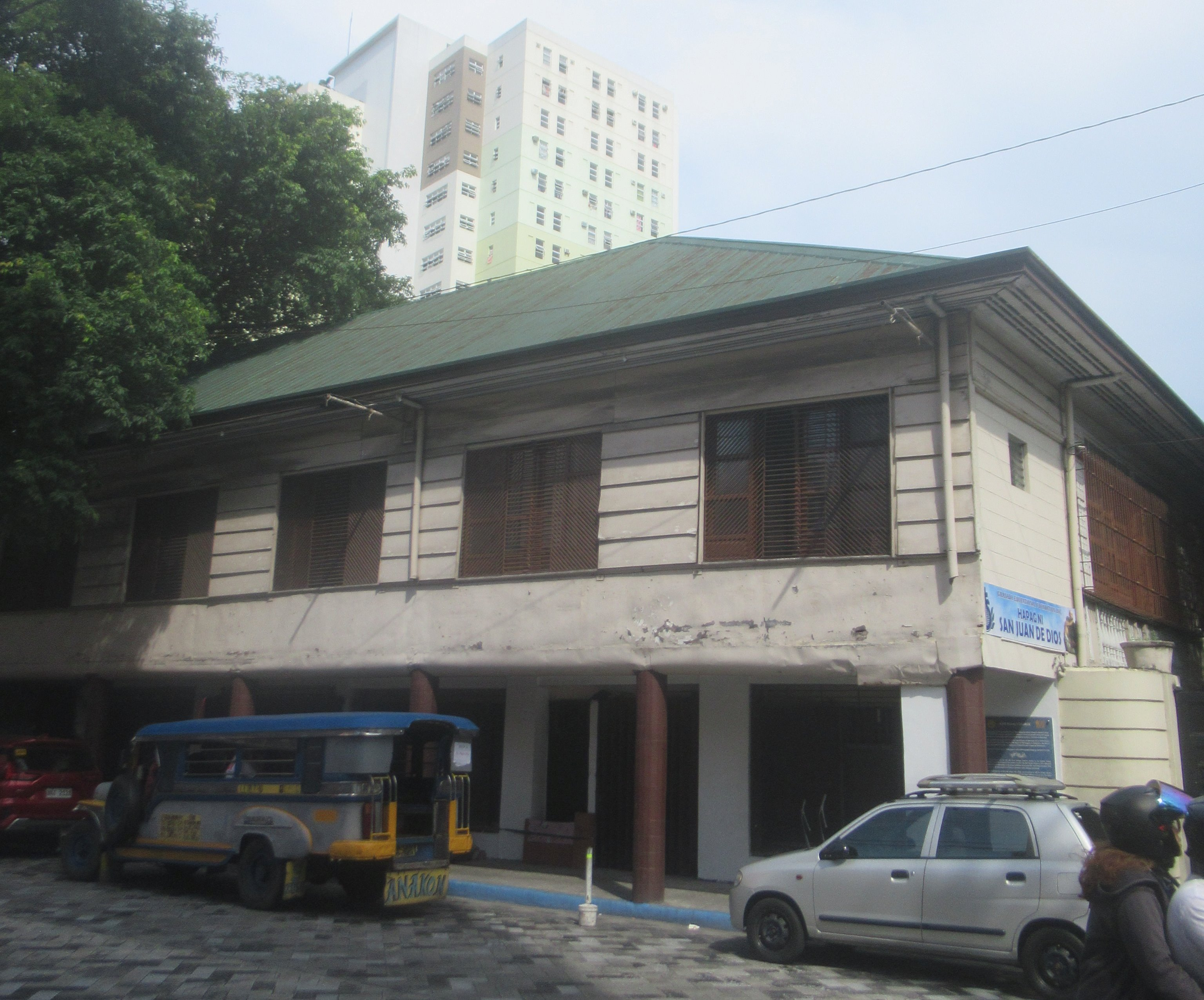
Site of the old José Rizal College campus along Hidalgo Street, Quiapo, Manila

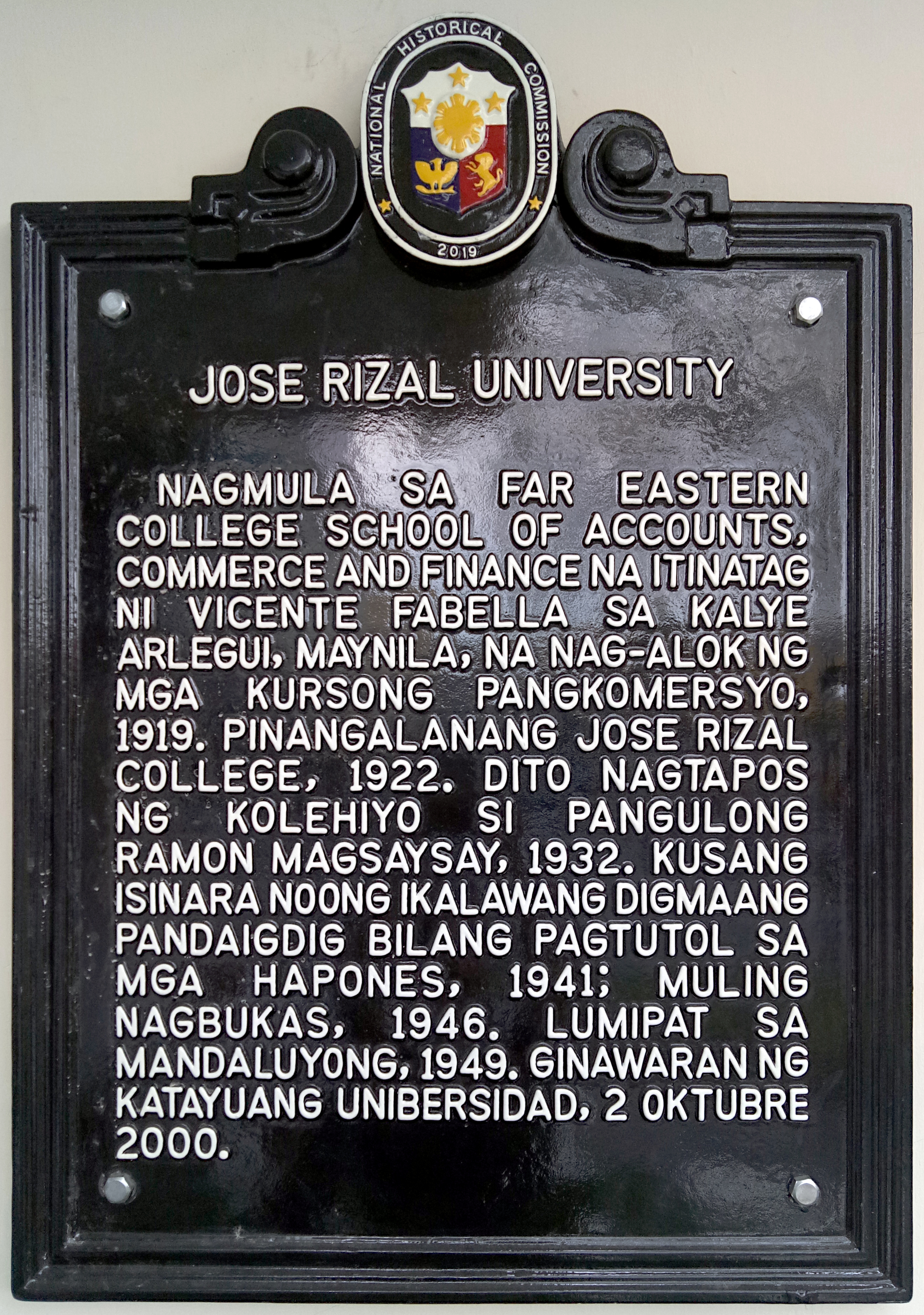
National historical marker unveiled in 2019

José Rizal University was established in 1919 by Vicente F. Fabella. Fabella was the first Filipino certified public accountant. The university was originally known as Far Eastern College Schools of Accounts, Commerce and Finance and was situated along Arlegui Street. In 1921, it transferred to 1063 Hidalgo Street, Quiapo, Manila and changed its name to José Rizal College the year after.

It closed operations throughout the Japanese occupation of the Philippines as Fabella joined the guerrilla movement. The closure was also a symbol of opposition against the Japanese. Following the end of the Second World War, the institution reopened in 1946. In 1949, it relocated to its present-day location at 80 Shaw Boulevard in Mandaluyong.

Originally offering commerce and high school degrees, the college expanded its offerings to include an elementary school, education and liberal arts at the undergraduate level, and law, business administration, public administration, and education at the graduate level. It has its own research publication, the Journal of Business, Education and Law. The college is especially proud of Ramon Magsaysay, who graduated with a bachelor's degree in 1932 and who subsequently became the seventh President of the Philippines.

José Rizal College was granted university status by the Commission on Higher Education in 2000. It was granted autonomous status by CHED "from 6 October 2009 to 5 October 2012".

== Academics ==
=== Law School ===
The primary purpose of the law school is to prepare men and women to meet the needs of progress and modern technology in the various aspects of the practice of law. These needs call not only for technical skills but also for responsible leadership in the development of the law and the administration of justice. It is in response to these needs that the four-year curriculum leading to the degree of Bachelor of Laws (LL.B.) was offered in 1967.

=== College ===
All courses offered in the College Division are recognized by the Commission on Higher Education (CHED) of the Government of the Republic of the Philippines. In addition, the undergraduate programs have been accredited by the Philippine Federation of Accrediting Agencies of the Philippines, and qualified by the Commission on Higher Education and the Department of Education, Culture and Sports.

The collegiate undergraduate programs in Commercial Science, Liberal Arts and Education have been granted Level III accreditation by Philippine Association of Colleges and Universities Commission on Accreditation and the Federation of Accrediting Agencies of the Philippines, and qualified by the Commission on Higher Education.

In addition, the university was granted a deregulated status by the Commission on Higher Education to recognize its commitment and contribution to the promotion of quality education. Only 50 universities in the Philippines have this seal.

=== High school ===
Literary and musical programs, convocations featuring noted resource persons, and other social gatherings are frequently held at the campus. Complete computer facilities are provided for the students' hands-on experience.

The High School has an active Student Catholic Action unit. Holy Mass is celebrated every first Friday of the month at the school campus. Religious instruction is conducted on a voluntary arrangement to interested Catholic students. The prayer room is open during school hours, where the students of all denominations may meditate.

The High School student body publishes a school paper, The Scroll, completely managed and edited by students. Students are encouraged to write and publish original articles in this school organ. They are given the opportunity to express themselves freely through writing. Managing the paper imbues the students' minds with the significance of responsibility and work, and plays an important role in the development of a mature student body. A yearbook, The Blue and Gold, is published annually by the senior class.

== Student life ==
=== Students Organizations ===
There are several of student organizations in the campus, all under the leadership of students with faculty supervision. From time to time, the different organizations sponsor convocations and open forum on subjects of current interest. Notable speakers with special knowledge of the topic are usually invited.

The Central Student Council

The highest student body on the campus, the Central Student Council prepares students for leadership in the community outside the college. It is composed of the officers of the different recognized campus organizations and advised by a senior faculty member. It has the basic task of coordinating student activities in which the whole student body has direct interest.

The Junior Philippine Institute of Accountants (JPIA)

One of the largest college organization in the Philippines, the JRU-JPIA is composed of different students who are taking BSA and BSBA-Accounting. It is an honor society devoted to the promotion of accounting through different programs. Furthermore, it aims to develop accounting students mentally, emotionally and socially as preparation for their journey to become Certified Public Accountant (CPA) in the future.

=== Athletics ===
José Rizal University is a member of the National Collegiate Athletic Association of the Philippines. It joined the National Collegiate Athletic Association in 1927. The college varsity teams are called the Jose Rizal University Heavy Bombers. The Bombers emblem features a man riding an aerial bomb, with the letters "JRU" ("JRC" when the school was still named José Rizal College) on his face. The school got the name "bombers" because of the rumored underground bombs on the campus area from the country's Japanese period.

"Heavy Bombers" is the title of the men's varsity teams, "Light Bombers" is for the High School teams, and "Lady Bombers" for the women's teams.

=== University Hymn ===
Himno José Rizal, or Jose Rizal Hymn, is the university's hymn. The Filipino lyrics was written by Daniel A. Cabaña, a high school student who won the university's hymn writing contest in 1978. It was adopted as the official alma mater song the following year. The melody was set by Restituto Umali, from the U.P. Conservatory of Music (now U.P. College of Music). Both Cabaña and Umali obtained their bachelor's degree in commerce from José Rizal College, which was JRU's previous name.

== Notable alumni ==
- Ramon F. Magsaysay, Sr., BCS '32 (President of the Philippines, 1953–57)
- Armand Fabella, MA '53, Chairman-UCPB, Chairman-JRU, Former DepEd Secretary)
- PGen. Avelino Razon, LLB, Chief of the Philippine National Police
- Jimmy Santos, TV host and former basketball player the Philippine Basketball Association.
- Bienvenido "Benny" R. Tantoco, BCS, Founder and CEO Rustan's
- Mel Lopez, former mayor of Manila, businessman, and PNOC chairman.
- PGen. Archie Gamboa, LLB, Chief of the Philippine National Police
- Roderick Paulate, Actor and TV host, and former Councilor, 2nd District Quezon City.
- John Marion R. Wilson, basketball player in the Philippine Basketball Association.
- Vergel Meneses, former basketball player for the JRU Heavy Bombers in the NCAA and the Philippine Basketball Association.
- Philip Cezar, (born December 1, 1951) is a retired Filipino professional basketball player in the Philippine Basketball Association (PBA). He was part of the fabled Crispa Redmanizers ballclub that won two PBA Grand Slams, in 1976 and 1983. He won the Most Valuable Player award in 1980. He was also a many-time Philippine national team player in the 1970s. He was also known by the monikers Tapal King and The Scholar.
- Lino L. Dizon, Kapampangan historian, scholar and writer. Retired professor of Tarlac State University and former commissioner, National Historical Commission of the Philippines.
