= Ninian (river) =

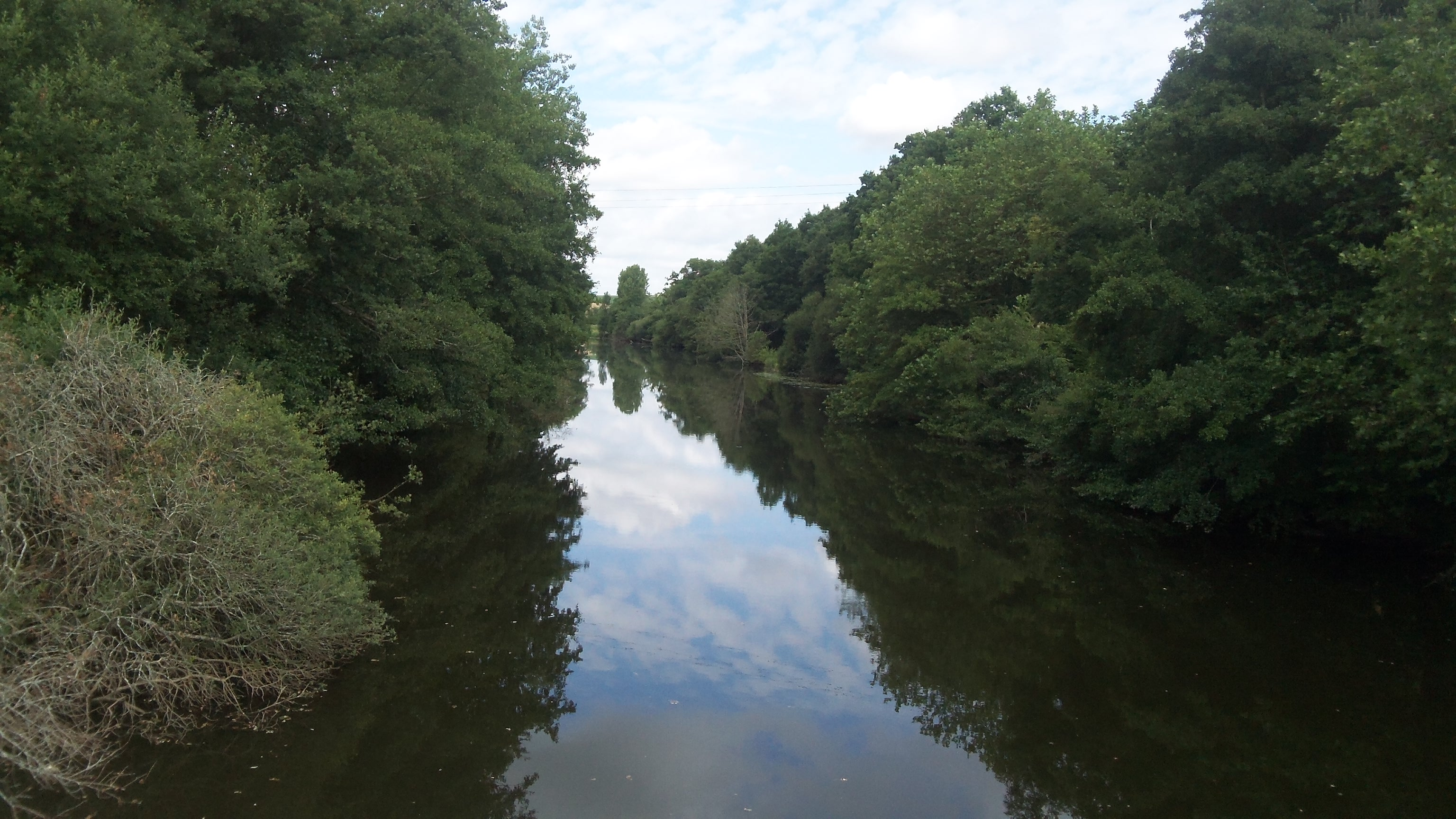

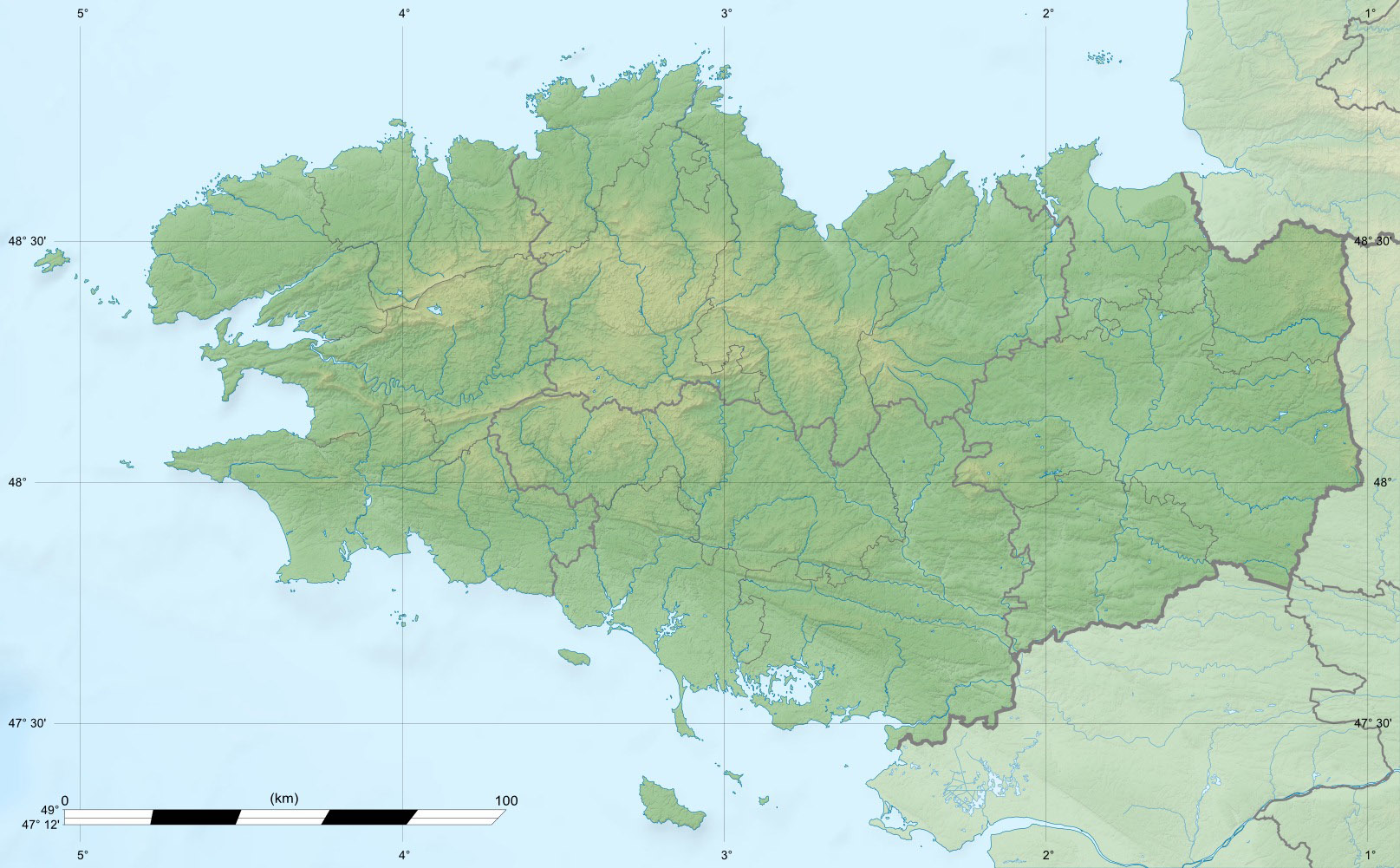
- Location within France Location within Brittany

Location
- Country: France

Physical characteristics
- Source
  - elevation: 270 m (890 ft)
- Mouth
  - coordinates: 47°53′17″N 2°26′11″W
  - elevation: 25 m (82 ft)
- Length: 60 km (37 mi)
- Basin size: 306 km^{2} (118 sq mi)

Basin features
- Progression: Oust→ Vilaine→ Atlantic Ocean

The Ninian (French pronunciation: [ninjɑ̃]) is a river in Brittany, France. Its length is 59.6 km (37.0 mi). Its main tributaries are the Trelan (at Mohon), the Léverin (at Taupont), the Yvel (at Ploërmel) and the Guerfo. It flows into the Oust near Montertelot.
