= MagnaCom =

US-Israeli microchip company

- Company type: Private
- Industry: IP communications
- Headquarters: Israel and ORange County, CA
- Key people: Yossi Cohen (CEO), Amir Eliaz (CTO)
- Products: WAM
- Website: Official website

MagnaCom is a technology IP license provider based in Israel and Orange County, California. The company is focused on reducing the bandwidth needed in wired and wireless communications, via the WAM technology, an alternative to Quadrature amplitude modulation The business provides technology to carriers, handset providers, wired and wireless companies, and is embedded in semiconductor chips.

MagnaComs WAM (WAve Modulation) is a Modulation Technology aimed at substituting QAM, which is present in cellular, Wi-Fi, fiber and wire-line broadband connections. MagnaCom claims WAM can gain 10 decibel on a signal, 400% in the range of Wi-Fi and a lower power consumption of 50%. This is achieved by a more efficient modulation scheme, carrying more info on the same space, improving speeds. These innovations are aimed towards a better connectivity on 5G cellular networks.

== Awards ==
- Electronics 360: 10 startups to follow in 2014
- FierceWireless’ Fierce 15: Top Wireless Companies
- 2015 CES Innovations Awards: Embedded Technologies
- Business Intelligence Group's 2015 BIG Innovation Awards: Major Impact in Today's World
- ECN Impact Awards: Market Disrupter
- Red Herring: Top 100 North America Winner
- 2015 EE Times ACE Award Finalist: Start Up of the Year

== See also ==
- Wave modulation
- Qualcomm
- QAM modulation
