= YVEL =

Israeli jewelry company

- Company type: Private
- Industry: Jewelry; Luxury goods
- Founded: Jerusalem, Israel (1986)
- Founder: Isaac Levy; Orna Levy
- Headquarters: Motza, Israel
- Area served: Worldwide
- Key people: Eliaz Gabay(CEO)
- Products: Necklaces; Rings; Earrings; Bracelets
- Number of employees: 100 (2016)
- Website: www.yvel.com

YVEL (pronounced E-vel) is a privately held luxury jewelry company in Jerusalem. Founded and owned by Orna and Isaac Levy, the company is best known for its pearl jewelry.

More than 90% of its employees are Jewish immigrants. The Megemeria School of Jewelry and Art, established by the Levys in 2010, employs Ethiopian Jews, gives them a stipend and trains them in jewelry design and goldsmithing, but also in Hebrew and everyday-life skills to help them integrate into the Israeli society.

Yvel collections are sold across five continents in more than 650 retail stores. Its designs have been worn by celebrities such as Scarlett Johansson, Katy Perry, Selena Gomez, Barbara Walters, Maria Sharapova, Bette Midler, Isla Fisher and Rihanna.

== History ==
Orna Levy (née Eliav) is a great-granddaughter of Shlomo Moussaieff, a rabbi and pearl merchant from Bukhara (now in Uzbekistan) who migrated to Jerusalem in the late nineteenth century and founded its Bukharim neighborhood. His sons became international traders in pearls and precious stones. Orna's mother Hannah, the eldest of 12 children, owned and operated a jewelry store in the King David Hotel in Jerusalem for 40 years.

Isaac Levy's father, a passionate Zionist, moved to Israel from Argentina in 1963, when Isaac was a child. The family was poor, did not speak Hebrew and was new to the local culture. The memories of the family's hardships later motivated Isaac to create Megemeria. His father co-founded a sausage factory, but his partners stole the company's funds and fled, leaving him broke. Five-year-old Isaac vowed to recover the factory land. Today, it is the land where the Yvel Design Center stands.

Orna and Isaac Levy met in 1986, in their twenties and unemployed. She convinced him to give her the $2,000 he had saved so that she could buy materials to make their first pearl necklace, even though he knew nothing about pearls. In the same year, they founded the company, which was then called Isaac Levy Jewelry.

Since South Sea pearls were beyond their budget, the Levys started stringing freshwater pearls with gold beads and semiprecious stones such as lapis lazuli, coral, onyx and turquoise. They worked on the porch of their apartment in Jerusalem and started by selling their designs to the Padani jewelry company in Tel Aviv. In 1991, the company's name was changed to YVEL ("Levy" spelled backwards).

In the 1990s and 2000s, the company spread its business across the world and attracted attention when celebrities started wearing its jewelry. In 2010, the Levys moved the company from the southern Jerusalem neighborhood of Talpiot to their newly constructed headquarters: the Yvel Design Center.

== Facilities and the Megemeria school ==
The Yvel jewelry design center and production factory stand on the slopes of the Judean Hills just outside Motza, along the Jerusalem-Tel Aviv highway. The 4,645 square metres (50,000 sq ft) complex houses a visitors' center with a 3D movie theater, where short films showing the company's history and mission are shown for jewelry shoppers, guests and visiting tour groups.

There is also a wine cellar on site, which was built within a restored 19th-century stone building that was once an inn for pilgrims on their way to Jerusalem and previously housed the Efrat winery.

Of the 100 employees, more than 90% are Jewish immigrants from 22 countries including Russia, Syria, Iraq and the United States.

The Megemeria School of Jewelry and Art, established in 2010, has focused on one underprivileged segment of the Israeli immigrant population. The school trains and employs only Jews who migrated from Ethiopia. The word "megemeriamm" means "genesis" in Amharic. The first class of 21 students, in the age range from 20 to 55, graduated in 2012.

The free 12-month course includes a seven-month introduction to the elements of jewelry making, including gem setting and the design process. The course is designed to enable the participants to undertake the five-month jewelry accreditation course of the Ministry of Industry, Trade and Labor. At the same time, they attend Hebrew, family budget management, mathematics and Israeli culture courses to help them become socially involved citizens. Mentors are chosen among the Yvel workers and Megemeria graduates. The participants receive a stipend equal to the Israeli minimum wage.

Since most of the students have never received formal education and are living below the poverty line, the courses are critical for their integration and employment. Graduates can choose whether they want to join Yvel, stay at Megemeria and help it become a self-sustained business, or seek work elsewhere as goldsmiths, pearl sorters or diamond setters.

The Megemeria jewelry collection represents the students' heritage and culture, as the designs incorporate inscriptions in their native Amharic. All profits generated by sales are put into a separate company, run by the graduates themselves, to help fund the salaries and running costs of the school.

The school was initially co-operated by the non-profit organization YEDID (Association for Community Empowerment) and financed by the Levys, who consider it part of their tikkun olam, and by their friends, Jewish organizations such as The Len-Ari Foundation, The Joint, the San Francisco Jewish Federation, World ORT and the Baron de Hirsch Foundation, as well as the Israeli government.

Yityish Titi Aynaw, the first Ethiopian Israeli to be Miss Israel, wore a Megemeria pendant to promote the program.

== Style and collections ==
Yvel specializes in baroque pearls, which instead of being perfectly round and white, appear as they come from nature. Isaac Levy described their method: "Most jewelry designers will design a piece of jewelry, then look for the pearl or stone. We first look for the pearl and create the jewelry around it. We let nature be the center of our design, to be enhanced with gold and diamonds." Orna Levy said, "We are not known for round pearl necklaces. Isaac and I go to pearl farms and auctions to buy pearls. We look for the striking color and shapes."

Yvel has more than a dozen gemstone collections including the Biwa, Golden Brown, Rainbow and One of a Kind. Their gold is not shiny but satin finish, evoking the desert that makes up most of Israel. The prices of Yvel's jewelry range from a thousand to millions of dollars.

== Boutiques ==
Yvel's products are sold in more than 650 stores internationally. The company's distributors include Rustan's, Saks Fifth Avenue, and Neiman Marcus.

The Levys introduced their U.S. flagship store in Miami's Design District during Art Basel Miami Beach 2014.

== Awards ==
In 2005, a brooch made of keshi pearl blossoms and white diamonds coming out of an elongated stem won for Yvel the Town & Country Couture Design Award for "Best in Pearl Design". The company has been awarded six "Best in Pearl Design" awards, which are considered the Oscars of the jewelry industry.

Other accolades include the Centurion Design Award for the pearl category. This competition is considered the Golden Globes of jewelry design, and Yvel won it twice in a row.
