= Yvel (river) =

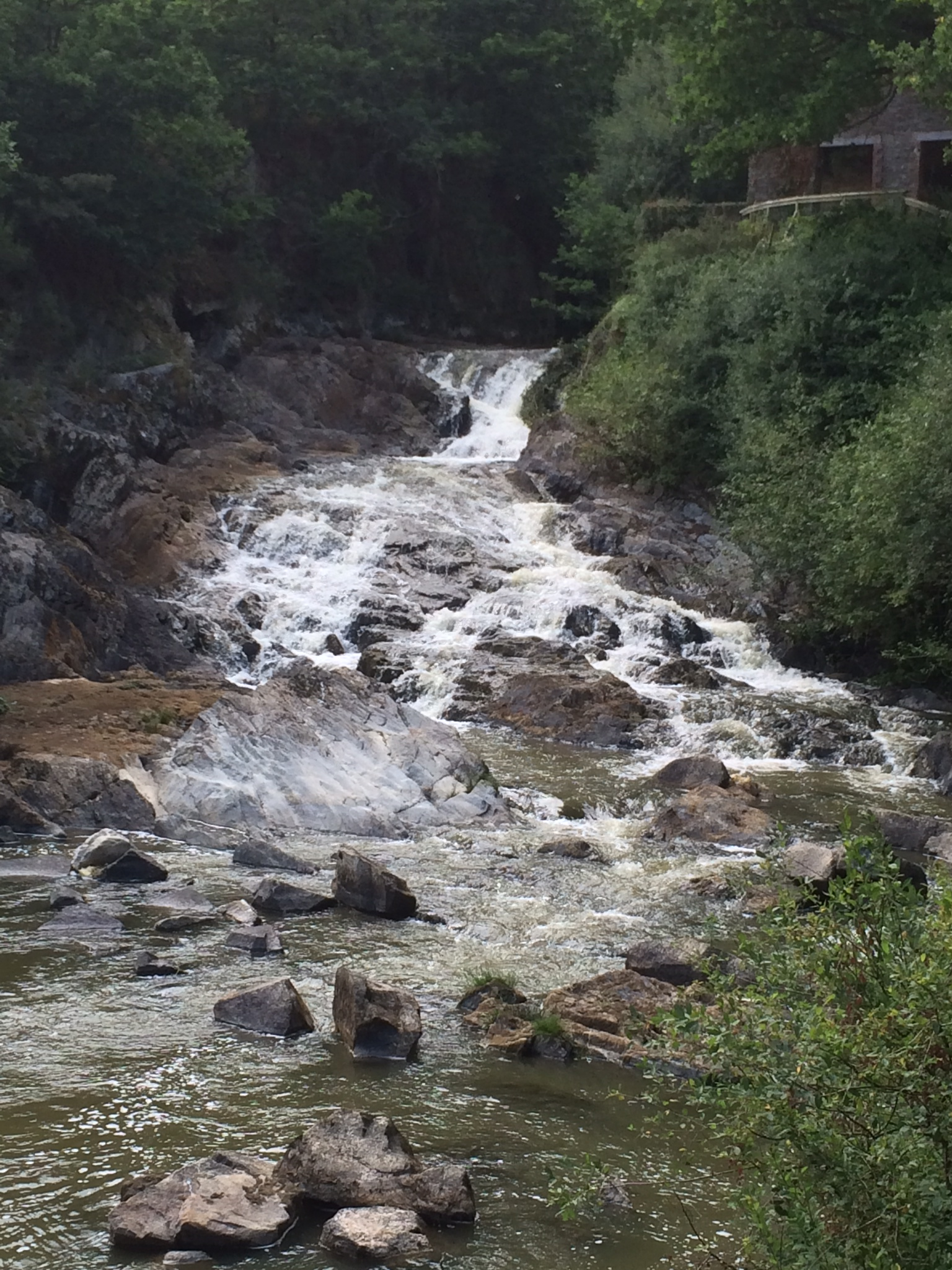

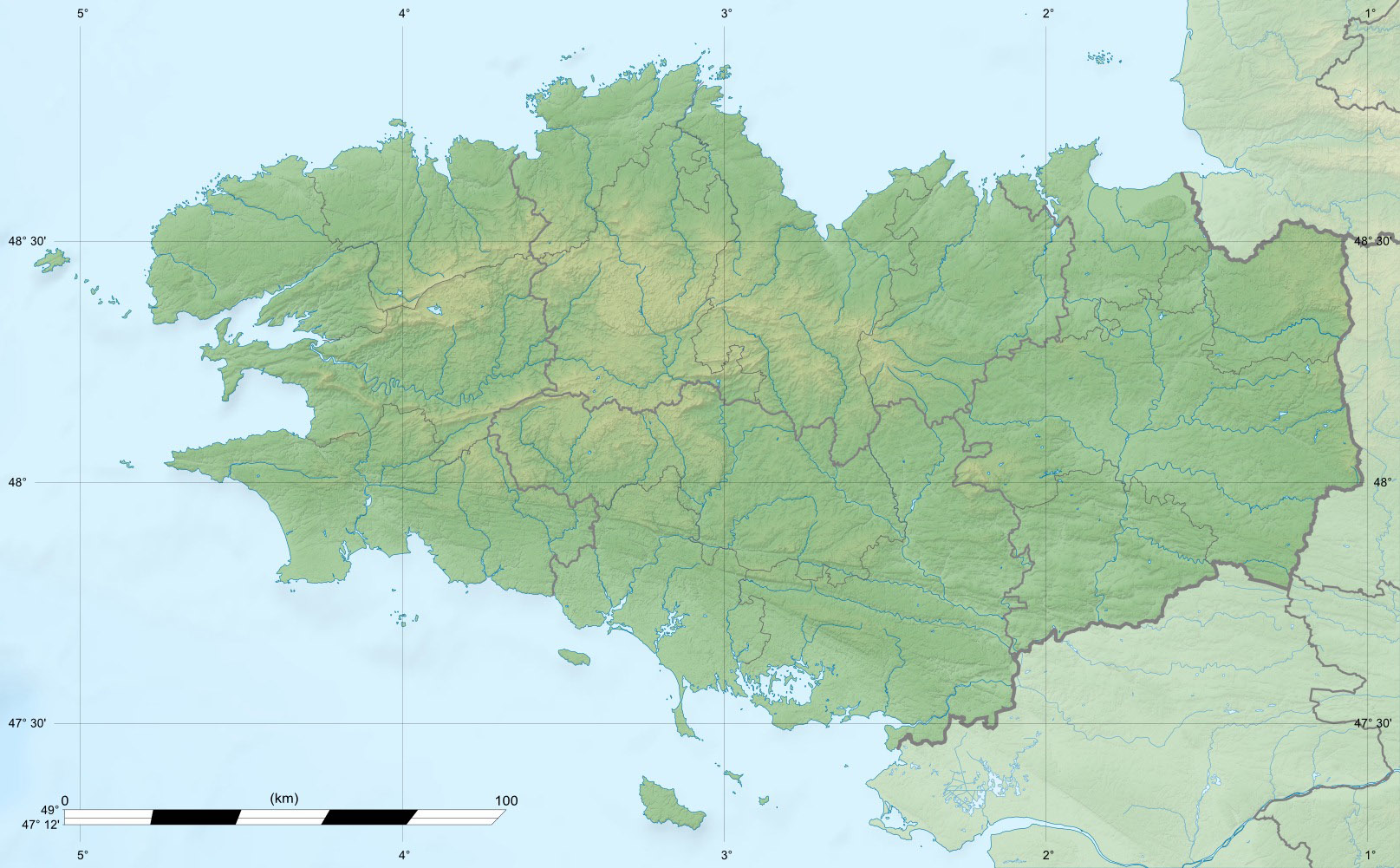
- Location within France Location within Brittany

Location
- Country: France

Physical characteristics
- Source
  - elevation: 240 m (790 ft)
- Mouth: Ninian
  - coordinates: 47°55′06″N 2°26′15″W
  - elevation: 23 m (75 ft)
- Length: 58.3 km (36.2 mi)
- Basin size: 375 km^{2} (145 sq mi)

Basin features
- Progression: Ninian→ Oust→ Vilaine→ Atlantic Ocean

The Yvel (Breton: Ivel) is a river in Brittany, France. Its length is 58.3 km (36.2 mi). The Yvel is one of the main tributaries of the Ninian, into which it flows near Ploërmel.
