= Edsa Shangri-La, Manila =

Hotel in Mandaluyong, Philippines

- Aerial view of Edsa Shangri-La, Manila
- Interactive map of the Edsa Shangri-La, Manila area

General information
- Status: Completed
- Type: Hotel
- Location: 1 Garden Way, Ortigas Center, Mandaluyong 1550, Metro Manila, Philippines
- Coordinates: 14.5813887°N 121.0570166°E
- Opening: August 28, 1992; 33 years ago
- Renovated: 1996, 2003, 2007
- Owner: Shangri-La Hotels

Design and construction
- Architects: Kanko Kikaku Sekkeisha, Yozo Shibata & Association (Tokyo) & R. Villarosa and Pireza Architects (Manila)
- Main contractor: BF Corporation

Other information
- Number of rooms: 632

Website
- www.shangri-la.com

Edsa Shangri-La, Manila is a 632-room hotel located at Ortigas Center, Mandaluyong, Philippines and one of the three hotels managed by Shangri-La Hotels and Resorts located in Metro Manila, Philippines. It opened on August 28, 1992.

== History ==
Edsa Shangri-La, Manila opened on August 28, 1992; it was the first Shangri-La property in the Philippines. Originally known as Shangri-La's Edsa Plaza Hotel, it was designed to recreate a five-star resort, such as those in Cebu and Boracay, but within the downtown Manila district of Ortigas Center. The hotel is 99.99% foreign owned.

In 2003, extensive renovations were completed, including the refurbishment of 440 rooms in the Tower Wing, and redesigns by Warner Wong Design and Architecture of Singapore for the Summer Palace and Nishiki restaurants.

In 2006 a US$3 million investment was announced to launch a spa facility, a then unique concept for Manila to have a Cebu-style spa within the city itself. It was modeled on the Shangri-La Mactan Island Resort & Spa, Cebu. The following year further renovations at a cost of US$8 million, creating 76 new jobs, saw improvement works on the Garden Wing and the Horizon Club Lounge.

In 2009 Shang Properties Inc. began construction of One Shangri-La Place, a twin-tower condominium that is part of an integrated community including Edsa Shangri-La Hotel and Shangri-La Plaza. The 60-storey structure includes 580 units and is expected to earn P10 billion, with completion of residential units due in 2014. In 2013 the Shangri-La Plaza, part of the Shang Place estate, was extended with the opening of the Shangri-La Plaza East Wing, the retail section of the forthcoming One Shangri-La Place residential tower to be completed in 2014.

Current General Manager Michael Hernandez, Patrick Schaub, and Omit Oberoi, who previously worked on properties in Thailand, the US, and Switzerland, took over from Henry Lee in April 2013.

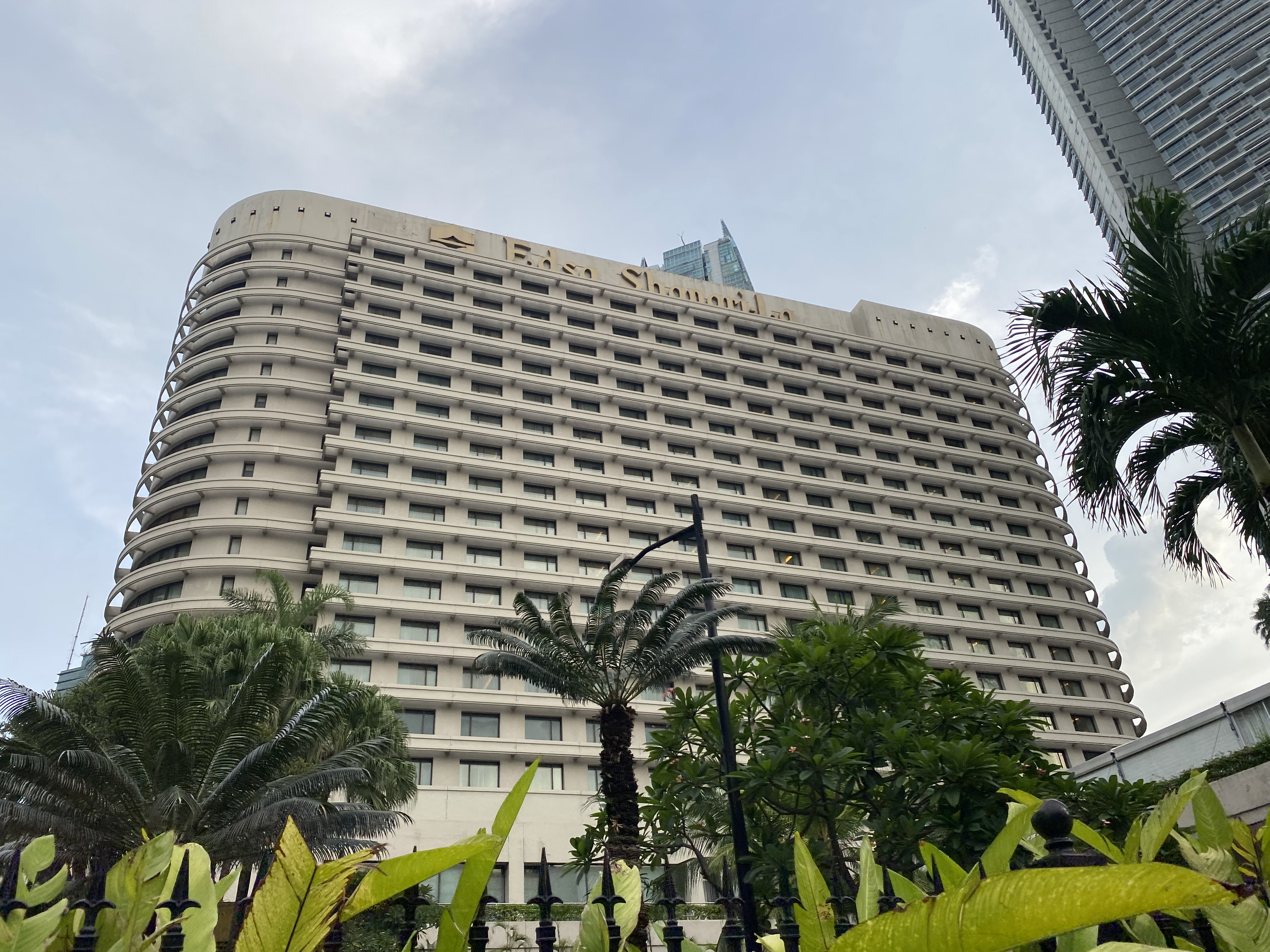
The hotel in 2025

== Design and construction ==
The resort was designed by Kanko Kikaku Sekkeisha of Tokyo and R. Villarosa Architects, with BF Corporation as the main contractor. and features two white towers set in a tropical garden amongst the mostly residential Ortigas Center. The floors of the hotel are marble, while the interior includes Asian paintings and floral arrangements. The Tower Wing is coloured brown and red with cityscape views, while the Garden Wing has views over the landscaped gardens.

Interior design was developed by Hirsch Bedner Associates Design Consultants of Hong Kong during the 2006/7 renovations of the Garden Wing. Warner Wong Associates of Singapore renovated the rooms of the Tower Wing in 2003/4, while Leese Robertson Freeman of Hong Kong are currently renovating the same rooms for 2012/3. The hotel focuses on using local supplies and craftsmanship, such as the woodwork in the Summer Palace, designed by renowned Filipino artist-sculptor Claude Tayag.

The complex covers an area of 8.6 hectares (21 acres), and includes the hotel, Shangri-La Plaza, the residential St. Francis Shangri-La Place and a new Shangri-La Plaza East Wing opened in 2013.

== Features ==
The hotel includes Horizon Club floors located on the 11th to the 14th floors, an outdoor pool, a 24-hour gym, spa, outdoor tennis courts, function and banquet halls that can accommodate up to 1,200 people, and a number of restaurants and bars.

=== Rooms and suites ===
The hotel has 632 rooms and come in 9 types, including 4 Deluxe Suites, 19 Premier Suites, 2 Shangri-La Suites and 1 Edsa Suite.

=== Restaurants ===
Edsa Shangri-La serves up to one million diners a year at its food and beverage outlets, to both room guests and locals,

The hotel also hosts The Bakeshop, The Lobby Lounge, and, formerly, e's Bar which is now an event space.

- HEAT - international restaurant with 426 seats located on the Lobby Level. Unveiled after a five-month renovation by Hirsch-Bedner in January 2006, it replaced the previous Garden Cafe.
- Summer Palace - Cantonese restaurant with 250 seats.
- Senju - Japanese restaurant that opened in 2006, replacing the former Japanese restaurant Nishiki.
- Paparazzi - Italian restaurant, refurbished in 2004.

=== CHI, The Spa ===
CHI, The Spa at Shangri-La, covering 3,000 square meters (32,000 sq ft) and featuring 10 treatment suites, was announced in 2006 with a US$3 million investment. It was opened in July 2007.

== Events ==
The hotel is frequently used for national and international events, such as The National Book Awards and exclusive fashion shows by designers such as Francis Libiran.

It is also used as an informal gathering point for leading journalists, business executives, corporate communications professionals etc., for get-togethers like the Tuesday Club, in which the members have invited special guests to share ideas over breakfast for 20 years.

== See also ==
- Shangri-La Hotels and Resorts
