= Rustan's =

Philippine department store chain

- Rustan's at Ayala Center, Makati in April 2015
- Company type: Corporation
- Industry: Retail
- Founded: 1952; 74 years ago in Manila, Philippines
- Founder: Benny Rufino Tantoco; Gliceria Tantoco
- Headquarters: Makati, Metro Manila, Philippines
- Products: Clothing, footwear, bedding, furniture, jewelry, cosmetics, housewares, children's wear, toys, supermarket
- Number of employees: 30,000 (nationwide) (2009)
- Parent: Rustan Commercial Corporation
- Website: rustans.com

Rustan's is a Philippine chain of upmarket department stores owned by the Rustan Group of Companies (RGOC). Rustan's Department Store is the flagship brand of the Rustan Group of Companies and has five major branches, three boutiques and an online shopping store rustans.com. Rustan's Department Store is considered the Philippines most prestigious retailer, carrying many of the world's most famous upscale or luxury brand names, among them, Cartier, Mikimoto, Tiffany, Ermenegildo Zegna, Nina Ricci, Alfred Dunhill, Sonia Rykiel, and Estee Lauder. Rustan's was the first in the Philippine retailer to introduce a customer loyalty program, "Frequent Shoppers Plus" and a Wedding Registry.

The brand was also applied to a chain of supermarkets (Rustan's Supermarkets, 1970–2020) founded by the Rustan Group in 1970 which it owned until its divestment in 2017.

== History ==
=== Early years ===
Rustan's Department Store was established in 1952 by spouses, Benny Rufino Tantoco and Gliceria (née Rustia) Tantoco. Rustan's is a portmanteau of the couple's respective family names. Following a trip by the couple to Europe, Rustan's Department Store began as a set of goods displayed for sale in the couple's living room. Eventually, the Tantocos expanded the business to a small gift shop located along San Marcelino Street, Manila. In the following decade, it grew into a full-fledged department store.

By the 1960s, Rustan's successfully introduced several international and haute couture brands to the Philippines for the first time, including Yves Saint Laurent and Christian Dior. By 1970, the flagship store opened in Makati and the building became well known for its blue external tile work for many decades and was sometimes referred to as the "Jewel box." More brands followed including Lacoste, Lanvin, Gucci, and others.

To facilitate this growth, Rustan Marketing Corporation was established in 1964 to introduce brands to the store and also undertake nationwide distribution of renowned brands. Today, this continues with a diversified portfolio of brands within beauty and personal care, apparel, watches, luggage, footwear, accessories, home, and lifestyle products.

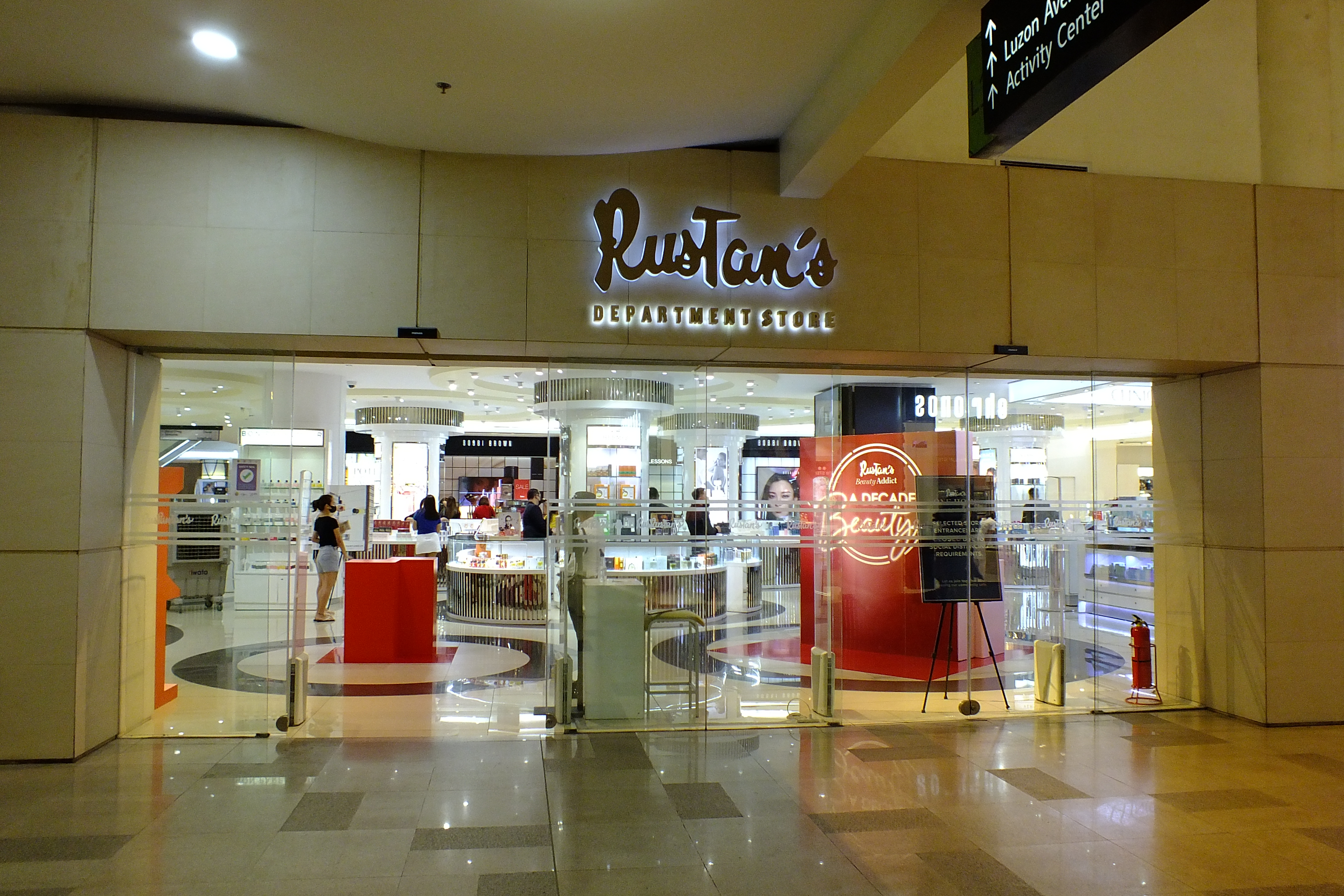
Rustan's Department Store at Ayala Center Cebu

By 1973, it opened a second major store in Cubao, Quezon City and a third at Mango Square, Cebu City in 1981.

=== 1978 elections; Tantocos' legal issues ===
During the 1978 elections for the Interim Batasang Pambansa, the Rustan's department store in Manila was claimed by Fr. James Reuter, a Jesuit priest and writer, to have required its employees to register for the elections within the store itself, then later vote for KBL candidates in the same venue as well, lest they lose their employment.

Due to alleged ties with President Ferdinand Marcos and First Lady Imelda Marcos, several legal cases were filed against Rustan's owners Benny and Gliceria Tantoco after the Marcos couple were ousted in February 1986 during the People Power Revolution. On October 21, 1988, U.S. Attorney and future New York City Mayor Rudy Giuliani indicted the Tantoco couple, alongside Ferdinand and Imelda Marcos, for conspiring to "embezzle[...] certain Philippine government funds." In 1996, Benny Tantoco settled a lawsuit for $1 million over the ownership of the Marcos couple's house in Honolulu, Hawaii. The Tantoco couple's cases would only end in 2023 when the Supreme Court affirmed the Sandiganbayan's 2019 dismissal of their 1987 embezzlement case.

=== Further growth ===
During the 1990s, Rustan's grew to include a large store in upscale Shangri-la Plaza in Mandaluyong and another branch in Ayala Alabang, Muntinlupa and at Ayala Center Cebu in Cebu City.

In parallel, the Tantoco family's reputation as leading retailers continued to grow as the couple's six children became involved in the daily business. In 1987, Stores Specialists Inc began operations to focus on the Philippine franchises for many of the world's top brands. The brand portfolio consists of over 100 brands and over 600 stores; brands include Marks & Spencer, TWG Tea, The Gap, Old Navy, Banana Republic, Zara, Tory Burch, and Calvin Klein. Stores Specialists Inc. (SSI) is a publicly listed company in the Philippine Stock Exchange.

Other major businesses within the Rustan Group of Companies (RGOC) include Rustan Coffee which was one of the earliest operators of Starbucks outside the United States, Royal Duty Free Stores, ADORA – a luxury boutique department store, Santa Elena Realty Inc., and The Rustia-Tantoco Foundation.

The Tantoco couple's six children have been involved in different areas of the business over the years. Today, the chairman is the eldest daughter Zenaida R. Tantoco, while the president is the eldest grandson Bienvenido V. Tantoco III.

== Rustan's Supermarket ==
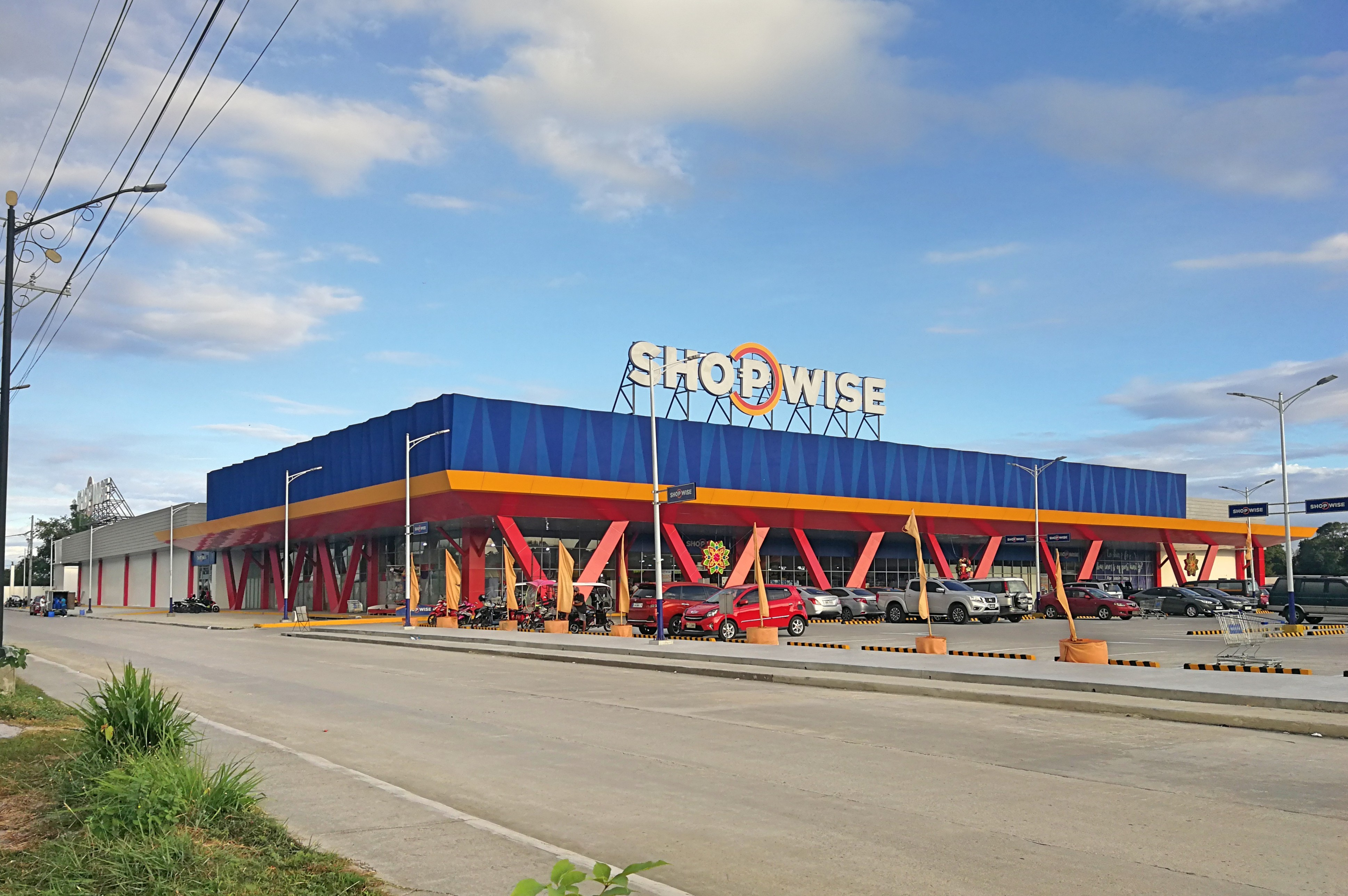
A Shopwise hypermarket at Lancaster New City, Imus, Cavite

Rustan's Supermarkets was established in 1970 by the Rustan Group. In 1998, Shopwise hypermarket was launched under Rustan Supercenters, Inc. (RSI). In 2006, the Rustan's supermarket chain (Rustan Supermarket, Inc.) was consolidated under RSI.

In 2012, the Dairy Farm Group acquired 50% interest in RSI. By 2017, the Dairy Farm Group acquired full ownership of RSI.

On March 23, 2018, the Dairy Farm Group sold RSI to Robinsons Retail Holdings, Inc. (RRHI) through a stock swap. After the sale, the Dairy Farm Group owned 18.25% and 1.75% of RRHI (20.00% in total) through Mulgrave Corporation and GCH Investments respectively. At the time of the sale, RSI operated Rustan's Supermarket, Marketplace by Rustan's, Shopwise, Shopwise Express and Wellcome (Philippines).

On April 11, 2018, Zenaida R. Tantoco, chairperson and CEO of the Rustan Group of Companies clarified that the Rustan's trademark and trade name was "never a part of the business transaction between RRHI and Dairy Farm Group, legally or otherwise." Tantoco stated that Rustan Commercial Corporation (RCC) is the sole owner of the Rustan's trademark and trade name and the use by any third party requires the written consent of RCC. The statement clarified that after the buy-in of the Dairy Farm Group into RSI in 2012, RSI was granted use of the Rustan's trademark and trade name for a "limited period of five years commencing from the year 2012 and was terminated upon our written notice to the Dairy Farm Group on April 3, 2018." The following day, RRHI issued a statement acknowledging the trademark license arrangement between RCC and RSI and should the trademark license of Rustan's be "validly terminated by RCC" such stores would be rebranded with "other premium brand alternatives."

The sale of RSI to RRHI was approved by the Philippine Competition Commission on August 17, 2018 and the transaction was completed on November 21, 2018. The rebranding of the Rustan's supermarket chain (Rustan's Supermarket and The Marketplace by Rustan's) to The Marketplace was completed by 2020 with some branches converted to Robinsons Supermarkets.
