= Golf Digest Tournament =

Tournament information
- Location: Susono, Shizuoka, Japan
- Established: 1971
- Course: Tōmei Country Club
- Par: 71
- Length: 6,781 yards (6,201 m)
- Tour: Japan Golf Tour
- Format: Stroke play
- Prize fund: ¥100,000,000
- Month played: October
- Final year: 1997

Tournament record score
- Aggregate: 265 Eiji Mizoguchi (1994)
- To par: −19 as above

Final champion
- (United States) Brandt Jobe
- Location in Japan Location in the Shizuoka Prefecture

The Golf Digest Tournament was a golf tournament in Japan. It was founded in 1971 and was part of the Japan Golf Tour from 1973 to 1997. It was played in October at the Tōmei Country Club near Susono, Shizuoka.

== Winners ==
Year	Winner	Score	To par	Margin of victory	Runner(s)-up	Ref.
Golf Digest Tournament
1997	(United States) Brandt Jobe	267	−17	Playoff	(Japan) Toru Suzuki	
1996	(Japan) Yoshi Mizumaki	273	−11	1 stroke	(Japan) Satoshi Higashi (Japan) Shoichi Kuwabara	
1995	(Australia) Stewart Ginn	267	−17	2 strokes	(Canada) Rick Gibson	
Asahi Beer Golf Digest Tournament
1994	(Japan) Eiji Mizoguchi	265	−19	5 strokes	(Australia) Stewart Ginn (Japan) Hiroshi Ueda	
1993	(Japan) Masashi Ozaki (3)	268	−16	2 strokes	(Japan) Tsuneyuki Nakajima	
1992	(Japan) Seiki Okuda	272	−12	1 stroke	(Australia) Roger Mackay	
1991	(Japan) Harumitsu Hamano	273	−11	1 stroke	(Japan) Masashi Ozaki	
1990	(Japan) Noboru Sugai	274	−10	3 strokes	(United States) Larry Mize (Japan) Masashi Ozaki	
Polaroid Cup Golf Digest Tournament
1989	(Japan) Yoshikazu Yokoshima	268	−16	6 strokes	(Japan) Masaji Kusakabe (Japan) Kiyoshi Murota	
1988	(Japan) Masashi Ozaki (2)	272	−12	Playoff	(Australia) Brian Jones	
1987	(Australia) Ian Baker-Finch	275	−9	4 strokes	(Japan) Kazushige Kono	
1986	(Japan) Tsuneyuki Nakajima (2)	275	−6	Playoff	(United States) David Ishii	
1985	(United States) D. A. Weibring	268	−16	2 strokes	(Japan) Yasuhiro Funatogawa	
Golf Digest Tournament
1984	(Japan) Shinsaku Maeda	274	−14	3 strokes	(Japan) Seiji Ebihara	
1983	(Japan) Seiichi Kanai	276	−12	2 strokes	(Japan) Kouichi Inoue	
1982	(Taiwan) Hsieh Min-Nan	274	−14	1 stroke	(Japan) Akira Yabe	
1981	(Japan) Toyotake Nakao	287	−10	Playoff	(Japan) Tsuneyuki Nakajima	
1980	(Japan) Teruo Sugihara (2)	275	−13	2 strokes	(Japan) Isao Aoki	
1979	(Taiwan) Kuo Chie-Hsiung	206 (Note: Shortened to 54 holes due to weather.)	−10	3 strokes	(Japan) Fujio Kobayashi	
1978	(Japan) Masaru Amono	280	−8	1 stroke	(Japan) Shinsaku Maeda (Japan) Masashi Ozaki	
1977	(Japan) Takashi Murakami (2)	275	−13	4 strokes	(Japan) Masashi Ozaki	
1976	(Japan) Tsuneyuki Nakajima	279	−9	2 strokes	(Japan) Kikuo Arai	
1975	(Japan) Kenichi Yamada	240 (Note: Shortened to 63 holes due to Thyphoon Cora.)	−12	1 stroke	(Japan) Shozo Miyamoto	
1974	(Japan) Takashi Murakami	271	−17	1 stroke	(Taiwan) Kuo Chie-Hsiung	
1973	(Japan) Teruo Sugihara	274	−14	2 strokes	(Japan) Tōru Nakamura	
1972	(Japan) Haruo Yasuda	204	−12	3 strokes	(Taiwan) Hsieh Yung-yo (Japan) Shohei Nishida	
1971	(Japan) Masashi Ozaki					
