= 1980 PGA of Japan Tour =

Golf tour season

1980 PGA of Japan Tour season
- Duration: 27 March 1980 – 7 December 1980
- Number of official events: 38
- Most wins: (Japan) Isao Aoki (5)
- Money list: (Japan) Isao Aoki

The 1980 PGA of Japan Tour was the eighth season of the PGA of Japan Tour, the main professional golf tour in Japan since it was formed in 1973.

== Schedule ==
The following table lists official events during the 1980 season.

Date	Tournament	Location	Purse (¥)	Winner (Note: The number in brackets after each winner's name is the number of PGA of Japan Tour events they had won up to and including that tournament. This information is only shown for PGA of Japan Tour members.)	Other tours (Note: AGC − Asia Golf Circuit.)	Notes
30 Mar	Shizuoka Open	Shizuoka	25,000,000	(Japan) Katsuji Hasegawa (1)		
6 Apr	Aso National Park Open	Kumamoto	10,000,000	(Japan) Masaji Kusakabe (6)		
13 Apr	Kuzuha Kokusai Tournament	Osaka	12,000,000	(Japan) Yoshikazu Yokoshima (2)		
27 Apr	Dunlop International Open	Ibaraki	US$110,000	(Japan) Masashi Ozaki (22)	AGC	
4 May	Chunichi Crowns	Aichi	65,000,000	(Japan) Isao Aoki (25)		
11 May	Fujisankei Classic	Saitama	28,000,000	(Japan) Masashi Ozaki (23)		
18 May	Japan PGA Match-Play Championship	Kanagawa	30,000,000	(Japan) Haruo Yasuda (4)		
25 May	Yomiuri Open	Hyōgo	30,000,000	(Japan) Isao Aoki (26)		
1 Jun	Mitsubishi Galant Tournament	Shiga	35,000,000	(Japan) Tsuneyuki Nakajima (3)		
8 Jun	Tohoku Classic	Miyagi	25,000,000	(Japan) Haruo Yasuda (5)		
15 Jun	Sapporo Tokyu Open	Hokkaidō	30,000,000	(Taiwan) Hsieh Min-Nan (5)		
22 Jun	Pepsi-Wilson Tournament	Yamaguchi	25,000,000	(Japan) Norio Suzuki (10)		
29 Jun	Kanto Pro Championship	Tochigi	20,000,000	(Japan) Akira Yabe (3)		
29 Jun	Kansai Pro Championship	Fukuoka	12,000,000	(Japan) Teruo Sugihara (12)		
20 Jul	Descente Cup Hokkoku Open	Ishikawa	20,000,000	(Japan) Akira Yabe (4)		New tournament
3 Aug	JPGA East-West Tournament	Miyagi	12,000,000	(Japan) Shigeru Uchida (2)		
10 Aug	Mizuno Tournament	Ishikawa	20,000,000	(Japan) Norio Suzuki (11)		
24 Aug	Nihon Kokudo Keikaku Summers	Nagano	30,000,000	(Japan) Yasuhiro Funatogawa (1)		
31 Aug	KBC Augusta	Fukuoka	30,000,000	(Japan) Isao Aoki (27)		
7 Sep	Suntory Open	Chiba	40,000,000	(United States) Bill Rogers (n/a)		
14 Sep	ANA Sapporo Open	Hokkaidō	30,000,000	(Japan) Teruo Sugihara (13)		
21 Sep	Hiroshima Open	Hiroshima	25,000,000	(Japan) Norio Suzuki (12)		
28 Sep	Kanto Open	Saitama	20,000,000	(Japan) Isao Aoki (28)		
28 Sep	Kansai Open	Hyōgo	15,000,000	(Japan) Takemitsu Uranishi (1)		
28 Sep	Chubu Open	Aichi	12,000,000	(Japan) Hisashi Suzumura (1)		
28 Sep	Chushikoku Open	Hiroshima	5,000,000	(Japan) Masahiro Kuramoto (a) (1)		
28 Sep	Kyusyu Open	Fukuoka	8,000,000	(Japan) Yurio Akitomi (2)		
28 Sep	Hokkaido Open	Hokkaidō	4,000,000	(Japan) Koichi Uehara (4)		
5 Oct	Japan PGA Championship	Gunma	30,000,000	(Japan) Yoshitaka Yamamoto (7)		
12 Oct	Tokai Classic	Aichi	32,000,000	(United States) Larry Nelson (n/a)		
19 Oct	Golf Digest Tournament	Shizuoka	25,000,000	(Japan) Teruo Sugihara (14)		
26 Oct	Bridgestone Tournament	Chiba	30,000,000	(United States) Bob Gilder (n/a)		
3 Nov	Japan Open Golf Championship	Kanagawa	50,000,000	(Japan) Shoji Kikuchi (1)		
9 Nov	ABC Japan vs USA Golf Matches	Hyōgo	US$150,000	(United States) Jerry Pate (n/a)		
16 Nov	Toshiba Taiheiyo Masters	Shizuoka	US$300,000	(Japan) Norio Suzuki (13)		
23 Nov	Dunlop Phoenix Tournament	Miyazaki	70,000,000	(United States) Tom Watson (n/a)		
30 Nov	Gene Sarazen Jun Classic	Tochigi	35,000,000	(Japan) Isao Aoki (29)		
7 Dec	Golf Nippon Series	Tokyo	16,000,000	(Japan) Masashi Ozaki (24)		

== Money list ==
The money list was based on prize money won during the season, calculated in Japanese yen.

Position	Player	Prize money (¥)
1	(Japan) Isao Aoki	60,532,660
2	(Japan) Norio Suzuki	48,132,102
3	(Japan) Masashi Ozaki	35,415,876
4	(Japan) Haruo Yasuda	30,141,305
5	(Japan) Teruo Sugihara	28,196,856
