= Yoshitaka Yamamoto =

Japanese golfer

Yoshitaka Yamamoto 山本善隆
Personal information
- Nationality: Japan
- Born: 29 January 1951 (age 75) Osaka Prefecture, Japan
- Height: 1.73 m (5 ft 8 in)
- Weight: 75 kg (165 lb; 11.8 st)

Career
- Sport: Golf
- Status: Professional
- Former tour: Japan Golf Tour
- Professional wins: 18
- Highest ranking: 98 (4 October 1987)

Number of wins by tour
- Japan Golf Tour: 13
- Other: 5

Best results in major championships
- Masters Tournament: DNP
- PGA Championship: DNP
- U.S. Open: DNP
- The Open Championship: T57: 1979

Yoshitaka Yamamoto (山本善隆, Yamamoto Yoshitaka; born 29 January 1951) is a Japanese professional golfer.

== Early life ==
Yamamoto was born in Osaka.

== Professional career ==
Yamamoto won 13 tournaments on the Japan Golf Tour. He was ranked in the top 100 in the world in the late 1980s.

== Professional wins (18) ==
=== PGA of Japan Tour wins (13) ===
| No. | Date | Tournament | Winning score | Margin of victory | Runner(s)-up |
|---|---|---|---|---|---|
| 1 | 7 Sep 1975 | Suntory Open | −20 (70-67-65-66=268) | 2 strokes | (Japan) Masashi Ozaki |
| 2 | 2 Nov 1975 | Bridgestone Tournament | −5 (68-74-69-72=283) | 3 strokes | (Japan) Haruo Yasuda |
| 3 | 7 Nov 1976 | Sony Charity Classic | −6 (70-67-72-73=282) | 1 stroke | (Taiwan) Lu Liang-Huan |
| 4 | 10 Jul 1977 | Kansai Open | −3 (74-71-70-70=285) | 3 strokes | (Japan) Tsutomu Irie, (Japan) Tadashi Kitta, (Japan) Shiro Kubo, (Japan) Yasuhiro Miyamoto |
| 5 | 13 Aug 1978 | Nihon Kokudo Keikaku Summers | −9 (68-71-72-68=279) | 3 strokes | (Taiwan) Hsieh Min-Nan |
| 6 | 30 Sep 1979 | Hiroshima Open | −18 (67-70-67-66=270) | 8 strokes | (Japan) Haruo Yasuda, (Japan) Yoshikazu Yokoshima |
| 7 | 5 Oct 1980 | Japan PGA Championship | −2 (71-72-71-68=282) | 1 stroke | (Japan) Seiichi Kanai, (Japan) Namio Takasu |
| 8 | 11 Jul 1982 | Niigata Open | −6 (69-69=138) | Playoff | (Taiwan) Hsieh Min-Nan |
| 9 | 3 Jul 1983 | Kansai Pro Championship | −17 (70-66-65-66=267) | 1 stroke | (Japan) Teruo Sugihara |
| 10 | 10 Nov 1985 | Hiroshima Open (2) | −11 (69-71-69-68=277) | 2 strokes | (Japan) Hajime Meshiai, (Japan) Tōru Nakamura, (Japan) Masashi Ozaki |
| 11 | 5 Jul 1987 | Kansai Pro Championship (2) | −14 (68-70-70-66=274) | 5 strokes | (Japan) Takeshi Nakaya, (Japan) Hideto Shigenobu |
| 12 | 3 Sep 1989 | Kansai Open (2) | −5 (67-74-70=211) | 1 stroke | (Japan) Kazuo Kanayama, (Japan) Toshiaki Nakagawa, (Japan) Tōru Nakamura |
| 13 | 5 Sep 1993 | Japan PGA Match-Play Championship Promise Cup | 3 and 2 | | (Japan) Koichi Suzuki |

PGA of Japan Tour playoff record (1–2)

| No. | Year | Tournament | Opponent(s) | Result |
|---|---|---|---|---|
| 1 | 1975 | Japan PGA Championship | (Japan) Takashi Murakami | Lost three-hole aggregate playoff; Murakami: −1 (4-4-3=11), Yamamoto: E (4-4-4=12) |
| 2 | 1979 | Japan Open Golf Championship | (Japan) Isao Aoki, (Taiwan) Kuo Chie-Hsiung, (Japan) Koichi Uehara | Kuo won with birdie on fourth extra hole Aoki and Uehara eliminated by birdie on first hole |
| 3 | 1982 | Niigata Open | (Taiwan) Hsieh Min-Nan | Won with par on fourth extra hole |

=== Other wins (4) ===
- 1972 Setouchi Series Okayama leg
- 1973 Wizard Tournament
- 1975 Ocean Expo Golf Tournament
- 1986 Kuzuha International

=== Japan PGA Senior Tour wins (1) ===
- 2002 Okinawa Senior Open

== Team appearances ==
- World Cup (representing Japan): 1976

== See also ==
- List of golfers with most Japan Golf Tour wins
