= Norio Suzuki (golfer) =

Japanese professional golfer

Norio Suzuki 鈴木規夫
Personal information
- Nationality: Japan
- Born: 12 October 1951 (age 75) Kagawa Prefecture, Japan
- Height: 1.71 m (5 ft 7 in)
- Weight: 68 kg (150 lb; 10.7 st)

Career
- Sport: Golf
- Status: Professional
- Former tour: Japan Golf Tour
- Professional wins: 19

Number of wins by tour
- Japan Golf Tour: 16
- Other: 3

Best results in major championships
- Masters Tournament: T45: 1981
- PGA Championship: DNP
- U.S. Open: DNP
- The Open Championship: T10: 1976

Norio Suzuki (鈴木 規夫, Suzuki Norio; born 12 October 1951) is a Japanese professional golfer.

== Career ==
Suzuki won 16 tournaments on the Japan Golf Tour and (as of March 2023) ranks 15th on the career victories list.

== Professional wins (19) ==
=== PGA of Japan Tour wins (16) ===
No.	Date	Tournament	Winning score	Margin of victory	Runner(s)-up
1	11 Jul 1974	Kyusyu Open	+2 (74-69-73-74=290)	5 strokes	(Japan) Kenji Ueda
2	1 Jun 1975	Dunlop Tournament	−10 (68-73-67-70=278)	2 strokes	(Myanmar) Mya Aye
3	18 Jul 1975	Kyusyu Open (2)	−5 (70-70-70-73=283)	4 strokes	(Japan) Katsuji Yanagita
4	16 May 1976	Fujisankei Classic	−9 (71-70-72-66=279)	Playoff	(Taiwan) Lu Liang-Huan
5	16 Jul 1976	Kyusyu Open (3)	−3 (74-72-71-68=285)	Playoff	(Japan) Katsuji Yanagita
6	25 Jul 1976	Shizuoka Open	−11 (71-72-67-67=277)	1 stroke	(Taiwan) Lu Liang-Huan
7	17 Jul 1977	Kyusyu Open (4)	−4 (71-71-68-74=284)	6 strokes	(Japan) Tetsuhiro Ueda
8	16 Jul 1978	Kyusyu Open (5)	+5 (71-73-78-71=293)	6 strokes	(Japan) Yurio Akitomi, (Japan) Satoshi Ichinose
9	18 Nov 1979	Taiheiyo Club Masters	−8 (73-69-67-71=280)	2 strokes	(United States) Rod Curl, (United States) Bill Rogers, (United States) Tom Watson
10	22 Jun 1980	Pepsi-Wilson Tournament	−12 (68-68-71-69=276)	1 stroke	(Japan) Isao Aoki
11	10 Aug 1980	Mizuno Tournament	−20 (64-69-68-65=266)	6 strokes	(Japan) Yoshikazu Yokoshima
12	21 Sep 1980	Hiroshima Open	−12 (71-69-68-68=276)	4 strokes	(Japan) Isao Aoki, (Taiwan) Chen Tze-ming, (Japan) Haruo Yasuda
13	16 Nov 1980	Toshiba Taiheiyo Masters (2)	−6 (73-68-70-71=282)	Playoff	(Japan) Masashi Ozaki
14	23 Aug 1981	Kansai Pro Championship	−10 (64-69-73-72=278)	2 strokes	(Japan) Tōru Nakamura, (Japan) Hideto Shigenobu
15	5 Sep 1982	Kyusyu Open (6)	+3 (71-72-77-71=291)	2 strokes	(Japan) Kinpachi Yoshimura
16	19 Sep 1982	ANA Sapporo Open	−10 (74-63-69-72=278)	1 stroke	(Japan) Isao Aoki

PGA of Japan Tour playoff record (3–0)

No.	Year	Tournament	Opponent	Result
1	1976	Fujisankei Classic	(Taiwan) Lu Liang-Huan	Won with par on fifth extra hole
2	1976	Kyusyu Open	(Japan) Katsuji Yanagita	
3	1980	Toshiba Taiheiyo Masters	(Japan) Masashi Ozaki	Won after concession on first extra hole

=== Other wins (3) ===
- 1975 Kuzuha International
- 1976 Aso National Park Open
- 1984 Kuzuha International

== Results in major championships ==
Tournament	1976	1977	1978	1979	1980	1981
Masters Tournament						T45
The Open Championship	T10	T26			T19	

Note: Suzuki only played in the Masters Tournament and The Open Championship.

Top 10
Did not play

"T" indicates a tie for a place

== Team appearances ==
- World Cup (representing Japan): 1978, 1980

== See also ==
- List of golfers with most Japan Golf Tour wins
