= 1973 PGA of Japan Tour =

Golf tour season

1973 PGA of Japan Tour season
- Duration: 26 April 1973 – 9 December 1973
- Number of official events: 30
- Most wins: (Japan) Isao Aoki (5) (Japan) Masashi Ozaki (5)
- Money list: (Japan) Masashi Ozaki

The 1973 PGA of Japan Tour was the inaugural season of the PGA of Japan Tour, the main professional golf tour in Japan.

== Schedule ==
The following table lists official events during the 1973 season.

Date	Tournament	Location	Purse (¥)	Winner(s) (Note: The number in brackets after each winner's name is the number of PGA of Japan Tour events they had won up to and including that tournament. This information is only shown for PGA of Japan Tour members.)	Notes
29 Apr	Chunichi Crowns	Aichi	18,000,000	(Japan) Isao Aoki (1)	
13 May	Kanto Pro Championship	Chiba	10,000,000	(Japan) Masashi Ozaki (1)	
20 May	Pepsi Tournament	Kanagawa	25,000,000	(Japan) Isao Aoki (2)	
27 May	Dunlop Tournament	Chiba	15,000,000	(Philippines) Ben Arda (1)	
3 Jun	World Friendship	Nara	10,000,000	(Taiwan) Lu Liang-Huan (1)	
17 Jun	Sapporo Tokyu Open	Hokkaidō	10,000,000	(Japan) Isao Aoki (3)	New tournament
8 Jul	ANA Sapporo Open	Hokkaidō	15,000,000	(Japan) Masashi Ozaki (2)	
15 Jul	Aero Masters	Tokyo	25,000,000	(Japan) Fumio Tanaka (1)	New tournament
19 Jul	Kansai Open	Hyōgo	6,000,000	(Japan) Teruo Sugihara (1)	
29 Jul	All Japan Doubles	Hokkaidō	10,000,000	(Japan) Takashi Murakami (1) and (Japan) Hideyo Sugimoto (1)	Team event
5 Aug	Tohoku Classic	Miyagi	10,000,000	(Japan) Masashi Ozaki (3)	
9 Aug	Kyusyu Open	Fukuoka	2,000,000	(Japan) Kunio Koike (1)	
12 Aug	Fujisankei Classic	Saitama	30,000,000	(Australia) Graham Marsh (1)	New tournament
19 Aug	Suntory Open	Shizuoka	30,000,000	(Japan) Hideyo Sugimoto (2)	New tournament
24 Aug	Chushikoku Open	Yamaguchi	1,000,000	(Japan) Mitsuhiko Masuda (1)	
26 Aug	KBC Augusta	Fukuoka	15,000,000	(Japan) Isao Aoki (4)	New tournament
30 Aug	Chubu Open	Gifu	2,000,000	(Japan) Hiroshi Ishii (1)	
2 Sep	Hiroshima Open	Hiroshima	8,000,000	(Japan) Tōru Nakamura (1)	
8 Sep	Kansai Pro Championship	Saga	8,000,000	(Japan) Kosaku Shimada (1)	
9 Sep	Kanto Open	Saitama	10,000,000	(Japan) Takashi Kurihara (1)	
16 Sep	Sanpo Classic	Chiba	10,000,000	(Japan) Namio Takasu (1)	
23 Sep	First Flight Tournament	Shizuoka	12,000,000	(Japan) Takaaki Kono (1)	
30 Sep	Japan Open Golf Championship	Osaka	20,000,000	(Philippines) Ben Arda (2)	
7 Oct	Golf Digest Tournament	Shizuoka	10,000,000	(Japan) Teruo Sugihara (2)	
14 Oct	Taiheiyo Club Masters	Chiba	90,000,000	(Japan) Masashi Ozaki (4)	
21 Oct	Japan PGA Championship	Gifu	10,000,000	(Japan) Isao Aoki (5)	
28 Oct	Tokai Classic	Aichi	16,000,000	(Japan) Masashi Ozaki (5)	
4 Nov	Bridgestone Tournament	Tokyo	15,000,000	(Japan) Hiroshi Ishii (2)	
25 Nov	ABC Japan vs USA Golf Matches	Wakayama	23,000,000	(United States) Al Geiberger (n/a)	
9 Dec	ANA Phoenix Tournament	Miyazaki	10,000,000	(Japan) Yasuhiro Miyamoto (1)	New tournament

== Money list ==
The money list was based on prize money won during the season, calculated in Japanese yen.

Position	Player	Prize money (¥)
1	(Japan) Masashi Ozaki	43,814,000
2	(Japan) Isao Aoki	31,595,926
3	(Japan) Teruo Sugihara	13,965,796
4	(Japan) Tōru Nakamura	13,806,190
5	(Japan) Kosaku Shimada	13,518,570
