= Takashi Murakami (golfer) =

Japanese professional golfer (born 1944)

Takashi Murakami 村上隆
Personal information
- Nationality: Japan
- Born: 25 May 1944 (age 82) Shizuoka Prefecture, Japan
- Height: 1.74 m (5 ft 9 in)
- Weight: 80 kg (180 lb; 13 st)

Career
- Sport: Golf
- Status: Professional
- Former tour: Japan Golf Tour
- Professional wins: 18

Number of wins by tour
- Japan Golf Tour: 11
- Other: 7

Best results in major championships
- Masters Tournament: T37: 1976
- PGA Championship: DNP
- U.S. Open: DNP
- The Open Championship: DNP

Achievements and awards
- PGA of Japan Tour money list winner: 1975

Takashi Murakami (Japanese: 村上隆, born 25 May 1944) is a Japanese professional golfer.

== Career ==
Murakami was born in Shizuoka. He started playing golf at the age of 11. He won 11 tournaments on the Japan Golf Tour and led the money list in 1975.

Murakami also had a decent amount of success outside of Japan. He recorded a number of runner-up finishes in the Australasian region. They were the 1968 West Australian Championship, 1969 Australian PGA Championship, and 1972 New Zealand PGA Championship. He also had much success on the Asia Golf Circuit events in 1972. He won the Malaysian Open and finished runner-up at the Singapore Open and Hong Kong Open. In the United States he finished in a tie for second at the PGA Tour's 1977 Hawaiian Open. He also played in the Masters Tournament in 1976 and 1977.

== Awards and honors ==
In 1975, Murakami won the money list on the Japan Golf Tour.

== Professional wins (18) ==
=== PGA of Japan Tour wins (11) ===
No.	Date	Tournament	Winning score	Margin of victory	Runner(s)-up
1	29 Jul 1973	All Japan Doubles (with Hideyo Sugimoto)	−26 (100-101-61=262)		
2	29 Apr 1974	Chunichi Crowns	−8 (63-71-68-70=272)	6 strokes	(Japan) Masashi Ozaki
3	6 Oct 1974	Golf Digest Tournament	−17 (66-67-70-68=271)	1 stroke	(Taiwan) Kuo Chie-Hsiung
4	18 May 1975	Japan PGA Match-Play Championship	2 up		(Japan) Namio Takasu
5	28 Sep 1975	Japan Open Golf Championship	−10 (74-69-69-66=278)	3 strokes	(Japan) Seiichi Kanai
6	19 Oct 1975	Japan PGA Championship	−6 (69-68-70-75=282)	Playoff	(Japan) Yoshitaka Yamamoto
7	16 Nov 1975	Japan PGA Championship	−7 (70-72-71-70=283)	1 stroke	(Japan) Seiichi Kanai, (Japan) Kosaku Shimada
8	4 Jul 1976	ANA Sapporo Open	−3 (74-68-76-67=285)	3 strokes	(Japan) Masashi Ozaki
9	8 Aug 1976	Kanto Pro Championship	−14 (67-66-70-67=270)		
10	31 Oct 1976	Bridgestone Tournament	−6 (71-75-69-67=282)	Playoff	(Taiwan) Hsieh Min-Nan, (Japan) Masaji Kusakabe
11	23 Oct 1977	Golf Digest Tournament (2)	−13 (70-66-67-72=275)	4 strokes	(Japan) Masashi Ozaki

PGA of Japan Tour playoff record (2–1)

No.	Year	Tournament	Opponent(s)	Result
1	1974	Tokyo Charity Classic	(Japan) Haruo Yasuda	Lost to birdie on first extra hole
2	1975	Japan PGA Championship	(Japan) Yoshitaka Yamamoto	Won three-hole aggregate playoff; Murakami: −1 (4-4-3=11), Yamamoto: E (4-4-4=12)
3	1976	Bridgestone Tournament	(Taiwan) Hsieh Min-Nan, (Japan) Masaji Kusakabe	Won with par on third extra hole Hsieh eliminated by par on second hole

=== Asia Golf Circuit wins (1) ===
No.	Date	Tournament	Winning score	Margin of victory	Runners-up
1	12 Mar 1972	Malaysian Open	−12 (69-66-71-70=276)	1 stroke	(United States) Marty Bohen, (New Zealand) Walter Godfrey, (Thailand) Sukree Onsham

=== Other wins (6) ===
- 1967 Grand Monarch
- 1968 Rolex Tournament
- 1969 All Nippon Doubles (with Hideyo Sugimoto)
- 1970 All Nippon Doubles (with Hideyo Sugimoto)
- 1972 Tohoku Classic, All Nippon Doubles (with Masashi Ozaki)

== Team appearances ==
- World Cup (representing Japan): 1972, 1975, 1976

== See also ==
- List of golfers with most Japan Golf Tour wins
