= Shoji Kikuchi =

Japanese professional golfer

Personal information
- Nationality: Japan
- Born: 13 July 1944 (age 82) Shizuoka Prefecture, Japan
- Height: 1.70 m (5 ft 7 in)
- Weight: 62 kg (137 lb; 9.8 st)

Career
- Sport: Golf
- Status: Professional
- Former tour: Japan Golf Tour
- Professional wins: 1

Number of wins by tour
- Japan Golf Tour: 1

Shoji Kikuchi (born 13 July 1944) is a Japanese professional golfer.

== Career ==
Kikuchi played on the Japan Golf Tour, winning once.

== Professional wins (1) ==
=== PGA of Japan Tour wins (1) ===
No.	Date	Tournament	Winning score	Margin of victory	Runners-up
1	3 Nov 1980	Japan Open Golf Championship	E (69-73-74-80=296)	1 stroke	(Japan) Isao Aoki, (Japan) Kazuo Yoshikawa

PGA of Japan Tour playoff record (0–1)

No.	Year	Tournament	Opponents	Result
1	1978	Gene Sarazen Jun Classic	(Japan) Katsuji Hasegawa, (Japan) Kesahiko Uchida	Uchida won with birdie on fourth extra hole Hasegawa eliminated by par on second hole
