= Japan PGA Match-Play Championship =

Tournament information
- Location: Hokkaido, Japan
- Established: 1975
- Course: Nidom Classic Course
- Par: 72
- Length: 6,957 yards (6,361 m)
- Tour: Japan Golf Tour
- Format: Match play
- Prize fund: ¥80,000,000
- Month played: September
- Final year: 2003

Tournament record score
- Score: 8 and 7 Todd Hamilton (1994)

Final champion
- (United States) Todd Hamilton
- Location in Japan Location in the Hokkaido Prefecture

The Japan PGA Match-Play Championship was a professional match play golf tournament that was held in Japan from 1975 to 2003. It was an event on the Japan Golf Tour and held at a number of different courses throughout Japan.

== Tournament hosts ==
| Year(s) | Host course | Location |
|---|---|---|
| 1994–2003 | Nidom Classic Course | Tomakomai, Hokkaido |
| 1993 | Higashinomiya Country Club | Motegi, Tochigi |
| 1992 | Prestige Country Club | Tochigi, Tochigi |
| 1991 | Shinyo Country Club | Toki, Gifu |
| 1988–1990 | Green Academy Club | Shirakawa, Fukushima |
| 1983–1987 | Mito Golf Club | Mito, Ibaraki |
| 1975–1982 | Totsuka Country Club (West) | Yokohama, Kanagawa |

== Winners ==
| Year | Winner | Score | Runner-up |
Japan PGA Match-Play Championship
| 2003 | (United States) Todd Hamilton (2) | 3 and 2 | (New Zealand) David Smail |
Japan PGA Match-Play Championship Promise Cup
| 2002 | (Japan) Nobuhito Sato | 5 and 4 | (Japan) Tomohiro Kondo |
| 2001 | (United States) Dean Wilson | 2 and 1 | (Taiwan) Lin Keng-chi |
| 2000 | (Japan) Kaname Yokoo | 2 and 1 | (Japan) Toru Taniguchi |
| 1999 | (Japan) Mamo Osanai | 4 and 3 | (Japan) Toru Taniguchi |
| 1998 | (Japan) Katsunori Kuwabara | 38 holes | (Japan) Shinichi Yokota |
| 1997 | (Japan) Shigeki Maruyama | 3 and 2 | (United States) Peter Teravainen |
| 1996 | (Japan) Nobuo Serizawa | 1 up | (United States) Brandt Jobe |
| 1995 | (Japan) Katsuyoshi Tomori | 2 and 1 | (Japan) Shigeki Maruyama |
| 1994 | (United States) Todd Hamilton | 8 and 7 | (Japan) Ikuo Shirahama |
| 1993 | (Japan) Yoshitaka Yamamoto | 3 and 2 | (Japan) Koichi Suzuki |
| 1992 | (Japan) Tsuneyuki Nakajima (3) | 3 and 1 | (Japan) Naomichi Ozaki |
Japan PGA Match-Play Championship Unisys Cup
| 1991 | (Japan) Satoshi Higashi | 2 up | (Japan) Tsuneyuki Nakajima |
| 1990 | (Japan) Naomichi Ozaki | 6 and 5 | (Australia) Brian Jones |
| 1989 | (Japan) Masashi Ozaki | 3 and 2 | (Japan) Hiroshi Makino |
| 1988 | (United States) David Ishii | 6 and 5 | (Japan) Noboru Sugai |
| 1987 | (Japan) Katsunari Takahashi (2) | 37 holes | (Japan) Masashi Ozaki |
Japan PGA Match-Play Championship
| 1986 | (Japan) Tsuneyuki Nakajima (2) | 6 and 5 | (Japan) Keiichi Kobayashi |
| 1985 | (Japan) Katsunari Takahashi | 2 and 1 | (Japan) Akira Yabe |
| 1984 | (Japan) Tōru Nakamura | 4 and 3 | (Japan) Kouichi Inoue |
| 1983 | (Japan) Tsuneyuki Nakajima | 38 holes | (Japan) Hideto Shigenobu |
| 1982 | (Japan) Isao Aoki (4) | 4 and 2 | (Japan) Yutaka Hagawa |
| 1981 | (Japan) Isao Aoki (3) | 38 holes | (Japan) Katsuji Hasegawa |
| 1980 | (Japan) Haruo Yasuda | 2 and 1 | (Japan) Tsuneyuki Nakajima |
| 1979 | (Japan) Isao Aoki (2) | 1 up | (Taiwan) Hsieh Min-Nan |
| 1978 | (Japan) Isao Aoki | 2 and 1 | (Japan) Takahiro Takeyasu |
| 1977 | (Japan) Tadashi Kitta | 1 up | (Japan) Tōru Nakamura |
| 1976 | (Japan) Kazuo Yoshikawa | 2 and 1 | (Japan) Kikuo Arai |
| 1975 | (Japan) Takashi Murakami | 2 up | (Japan) Namio Takasu |
