= 1975 PGA of Japan Tour =

Golf tour season

1975 PGA of Japan Tour season
- Duration: 7 February 1975 – 30 November 1975
- Number of official events: 33
- Most wins: (Japan) Takashi Murakami (4)
- Money list: (Japan) Takashi Murakami

The 1975 PGA of Japan Tour was the third season of the PGA of Japan Tour, the main professional golf tour in Japan since it was formed in 1973.

== Schedule ==
The following table lists official events during the 1975 season.

Date	Tournament	Location	Purse (¥)	Winner (Note: The number in brackets after each winner's name is the number of PGA of Japan Tour events they had won up to and including that tournament. This information is only shown for PGA of Japan Tour members.)	Other tours (Note: AGC − Asia Golf Circuit.)	Notes
9 Feb	JPGA East-West Match	Okinawa	15,000,000	(Japan) Teruo Sugihara (5)		
20 Apr	Sobu International Open	Chiba	US$50,000	(Japan) Teruo Sugihara (6)	AGC	
29 Apr	Chunichi Crowns	Aichi	35,000,000	(Japan) Isao Aoki (10)		
11 May	Fujisankei Classic	Saitama	30,000,000	(Taiwan) Lu Liang-Huan (4)		
18 May	Japan PGA Match-Play Championship	Kanagawa	30,000,000	(Japan) Takashi Murakami (4)		New tournament
25 May	Pepsi-Wilson Tournament	Kanagawa	25,000,000	(Taiwan) Hsieh Yung-yo (1)		
1 Jun	Dunlop Tournament	Ishikawa	20,000,000	(Japan) Norio Suzuki (2)		
8 Jun	Tohoku Classic	Miyagi	20,000,000	(Japan) Masashi Ozaki (12)		
15 Jun	Sapporo Tokyu Open	Hokkaidō	20,000,000	(Australia) Graham Marsh (6)		
6 Jul	ANA Sapporo Open	Hokkaidō	20,000,000	(Taiwan) Hsieh Yung-yo (2)		
13 Jul	Kanto Open	Chiba	15,000,000	(Japan) Isao Aoki (11)		
18 Jul	Kyusyu Open	Fukuoka	2,200,000	(Japan) Norio Suzuki (3)		
19 Jul	Chubu Open	Mie	3,000,000	(Japan) Hideo Noguchi (1)		
19 Jul	Kansai Open	Hyōgo	5,000,000	(Japan) Teruo Sugihara (7)		
25 Jul	Chushikoku Open	Yamaguchi	2,100,000	(Japan) Tadami Ueno (1)		
27 Jul	Sports Shinko International	Hyōgo	30,000,000	(Japan) Yasuhiro Miyamoto (2)		
3 Aug	Kanto Pro Championship	Hokkaidō	15,000,000	(Taiwan) Hsieh Min-Nan (1)		
3 Aug	Kansai Pro Championship	Hyōgo	8,500,000	(Japan) Hiroshi Ishii (3)		
24 Aug	KBC Augusta	Fukuoka	24,000,000	(Japan) Shinsaku Maeda (1)		
31 Aug	Hiroshima Open	Hiroshima	20,000,000	(Taiwan) Lu Liang-Huan (5)		
7 Sep	Suntory Open	Chiba	30,000,000	(Japan) Yoshitaka Yamamoto (1)		
14 Sep	Sanpo Classic	Chiba	20,000,000	(Australia) Bill Dunk (1)		
21 Sep	Shizuoka Open	Shizuoka	25,000,000	(Myanmar) Mya Aye (1)		
28 Sep	Japan Open Golf Championship	Aichi	50,000,000	(Japan) Takashi Murakami (5)		
5 Oct	Golf Digest Tournament	Shizuoka	20,000,000	(Japan) Kenichi Yamada (1)		
12 Oct	Taiheiyo Club Masters	Chiba	US$300,000	(United States) Gene Littler (n/a)		
19 Oct	Japan PGA Championship	Okayama	20,000,000	(Japan) Takashi Murakami (6)		
26 Oct	Tokai Classic	Aichi	32,000,000	(Japan) Yasuhiro Miyamoto (3)		
2 Nov	Bridgestone Tournament	Chiba	30,000,000	(Japan) Yoshitaka Yamamoto (2)		
9 Nov	Sony Charity Classic	Kanagawa	30,000,000	(Japan) Masaji Kusakabe (1)		
16 Nov	Golf Nippon Series	Tokyo	15,000,000	(Japan) Takashi Murakami (7)		
24 Nov	ABC Japan vs USA Golf Matches	Osaka	23,000,000	(Japan) Tōru Nakamura (4)		
30 Nov	Dunlop Phoenix Tournament	Miyazaki	60,000,000	(United States) Hubert Green (n/a)		

== Money list ==
The money list was based on prize money won during the season, calculated in Japanese yen.

Position	Player	Prize money (¥)
1	(Japan) Takashi Murakami	38,705,551
2	(Japan) Masashi Ozaki	27,658,148
3	(Japan) Yoshitaka Yamamoto	26,954,176
4	(Japan) Isao Aoki	26,375,833
5	(Japan) Kosaku Shimada	21,431,599
