= Masaji Kusakabe =

Japanese professional golfer

Personal information
- Nationality: Japan
- Born: 7 August 1946 (age 80) Chiba Prefecture, Japan
- Height: 1.75 m (5 ft 9 in)
- Weight: 69 kg (152 lb; 10.9 st)

Career
- Sport: Golf
- Status: Professional
- Former tour: Japan Golf Tour
- Professional wins: 20

Number of wins by tour
- Japan Golf Tour: 8
- Other: 12

Masaji Kusakabe (born 7 August 1946) is a Japanese professional golfer.

== Career ==
Kusakabe played on the Japan Golf Tour, winning eight official tournaments and several others.

== Professional wins (20) ==
=== PGA of Japan Tour wins (8) ===
No.	Date	Tournament	Winning score	Margin of victory	Runner(s)-up
1	9 Nov 1975	Sony Charity Classic	−7 (69-70-70=209)*	2 strokes	(United States) Danny Edwards, (Japan) Hiroshi Ishii, (Japan) Takashi Murakami
2	11 Sep 1977	Suntory Open	−9 (66-70-72-71=279)	3 strokes	(Japan) Fujio Kobayashi
3	15 Oct 1978	Tokai Classic	−6 (75-69-66-72=282)	2 strokes	(Japan) Kosaku Shimada
4	26 Aug 1979	KBC Augusta	−12 (67-71-68-34=240)*	3 strokes	(Taiwan) Kuo Chie-Hsiung
5	9 Sep 1979	Suntory Open (2)	−11 (66-73-69-69=277)	1 stroke	(Taiwan) Lu Liang-Huan
6	6 Apr 1980	Aso National Park Open	+1 (72-37=109)*	1 stroke	(Japan) Yurio Akitomi, (Japan) Namio Takasu
7	2 Jul 1981	Naganoken Open	−6 (67-71=138)*	Shared title with (Japan) Fujio Kobayashi	
8	11 Dec 1983	Daikyo Open	−10 (69-70-69-70=278)	2 strokes	(Japan) Akio Toyoda

*Note: Tournament shortened to 27/36/54/63 holes due to weather.

PGA of Japan Tour playoff record (0–1)

No.	Year	Tournament	Opponents	Result
1	1976	Bridgestone Tournament	(Taiwan) Hsieh Min-Nan, (Japan) Takashi Murakami	Murakami won with par on third extra hole Hsieh eliminated by par on second hole

=== Other wins (9) ===
- 1968 Mizuno Pro Rookies Tournament
- 1971 Chiba Open
- 1973 Chiba Open
- 1976 Mizuno Tournament
- 1977 Mizuno Tournament, Gunma Open
- 1980 Chiba Open
- 1983 Munising Classic
- 1994 Ibaraki Open

=== Senior wins (3) ===
- 1996 Komatsu Nagoya TV Open
- 1997 Japan Ginseng Pharmaceutical West Japan Senior Open
- 1999 Old Man Per Senior Open
