= Masaru Amono =

Japanese professional golfer

Personal information
- Nationality: Japan
- Born: 9 August 1942 Hiroshima, Hiroshima Prefecture, Japan
- Died: 28 July 2006 (aged 63)
- Height: 1.75 m (5 ft 9 in)
- Weight: 75 kg (165 lb; 11.8 st)

Career
- Sport: Golf
- Status: Professional
- Former tours: Japan Golf Tour; Champions Tour
- Professional wins: 3

Number of wins by tour
- Japan Golf Tour: 3

Masaru Amono (9 August 1942 – 28 July 2006), also known as Masaru Amano, was a Japanese professional golfer.

== Professional career ==
Amono played on the Japan Golf Tour, winning three times. As a senior golfer, he won the 1995 Senior PGA Tour qualifying school in the United States and played on the tour in 1996. His best finishes were a pair of ties for fourth at the Cadillac NFL Golf Classic and the Northville Long Island Classic.

== Professional wins (3) ==
=== PGA of Japan Tour wins (3) ===
No.	Date	Tournament	Winning score	Margin of victory	Runners-up
1	21 Oct 1978	Golf Digest Tournament	−8 (66-69-74-71=280)	1 stroke	(Japan) Shinsaku Maeda, (Japan) Masashi Ozaki
2	23 Sep 1979	Kanto Open	−10 (68-76-69-65=278)	2 strokes	(Japan) Kikuo Arai, (Japan) Kenji Mori, (Japan) Masashi Ozaki
3	17 Jul 1983	Gunmaken Open	−2 (72-68-74=214)	1 stroke	(Japan) Pete Izumikawa, (Japan) Akira Yabe
