= 1977 PGA of Japan Tour =

Golf tour season

1977 PGA of Japan Tour season
- Duration: 21 April 1977 – 4 December 1977
- Number of official events: 31
- Most wins: (Japan) Masashi Ozaki (4)
- Money list: (Japan) Masashi Ozaki

The 1977 PGA of Japan Tour was the fifth season of the PGA of Japan Tour, the main professional golf tour in Japan since it was formed in 1973.

== Schedule ==
The following table lists official events during the 1977 season.

Date	Tournament	Location	Purse (¥)	Winner (Note: The number in brackets after each winner's name is the number of PGA of Japan Tour events they had won up to and including that tournament. This information is only shown for PGA of Japan Tour members.)	Other tours (Note: AGC − Asia Golf Circuit.)	Notes
24 Apr	Dunlop International Open	Ibaraki	US$80,000	(Philippines) Ben Arda (4)	AGC	
1 May	Chunichi Crowns	Aichi	60,000,000	(Australia) Graham Marsh (10)		
15 May	Japan PGA Match-Play Championship	Kanagawa	30,000,000	(Japan) Tadashi Kitta (2)		
22 May	Fujisankei Classic	Saitama	30,000,000	(Japan) Yasuhiro Miyamoto (4)		
29 May	Pepsi-Wilson Tournament	Kanagawa	25,000,000	(Japan) Masashi Ozaki (16)		
5 Jun	Mitsubishi Galant Tournament	Ishikawa	30,000,000	(Taiwan) Hsu Sheng-san (1)		
12 Jun	Tohoku Classic	Miyagi	23,000,000	(Japan) Isao Aoki (13)		
19 Jun	Sapporo Tokyu Open	Hokkaidō	25,000,000	(Japan) Yasuhiro Miyamoto (5)		
26 Jun	Shizuoka Open	Shizuoka	25,000,000	(Taiwan) Lu Liang-Huan (6)		
3 Jul	ANA Sapporo Open	Hokkaidō	30,000,000	(Japan) Teruo Sugihara (8)		
10 Jul	Kansai Open	Shiga	12,000,000	(Japan) Yoshitaka Yamamoto (4)		
15 Jul	Chushikoku Open	Hiroshia	2,100,000	(Japan) Tadami Ueno (3)		
16 Jul	Chubu Open	Aichi	5,000,000	(Japan) Hiroshi Ishii (4)		
17 Jul	Kyusyu Open	Fukuoka	5,000,000	(Japan) Norio Suzuki (7)		
24 Jul	Kanto Open	Shizuoka	20,000,000	(Japan) Masashi Ozaki (17)		
7 Aug	Kanto Pro Championship	Tochigi	20,000,000	(Japan) Kenji Mori (1)		
7 Aug	Kansai Pro Championship	Yamaguchi	10,000,000	(Japan) Kosaku Shimada (5)		
28 Aug	KBC Augusta	Fukuoka	32,000,000	(Australia) Brian Jones (1)		
28 Aug	Hokkaido Open	Hokkaidō	1,700,000	(Japan) Koichi Uehara (1)		
4 Sep	Hiroshima Open	Hiroshima	20,000,000	(Japan) Yasuhiro Miyamoto (6)		
11 Sep	Suntory Open	Chiba	40,000,000	(Japan) Masaji Kusakabe (2)		
18 Sep	Sanpo Classic	Chiba	20,000,000	(Japan) Shigeru Uchida (1)		
25 Sep	Japan PGA Championship	Gifu	25,000,000	(Japan) Tsuneyuki Nakajima (2)		
9 Oct	Taiheiyo Club Masters	Shizuoka	US$300,000	(United States) Bill Rogers (n/a)		
16 Oct	Tokai Classic	Aichi	32,000,000	(Japan) Masashi Ozaki (18)		
23 Oct	Golf Digest Tournament	Shizuoka	20,000,000	(Japan) Takashi Murakami (11)		
30 Oct	Bridgestone Tournament	Chiba	30,000,000	(Japan) Fujio Kobayashi (1)		
13 Nov	ABC Japan vs USA Golf Matches	Hyōgo	US$120,000	(Japan) Isao Aoki (14)		
20 Nov	Japan Open Golf Championship	Chiba	65,000,000	(Spain) Seve Ballesteros (n/a)		
27 Nov	Dunlop Phoenix Tournament	Miyazaki	60,000,000	(Spain) Seve Ballesteros (n/a)		
4 Dec	Golf Nippon Series	Tokyo	15,000,000	(Japan) Masashi Ozaki (19)		

== Money list ==
The money list was based on prize money won during the season, calculated in Japanese yen.

Position	Player	Prize money (¥)
1	(Japan) Masashi Ozaki	35,932,608
2	(Japan) Isao Aoki	31,425,073
3	(Japan) Teruo Sugihara	28,135,386
4	(Japan) Yasuhiro Miyamoto	27,027,699
5	(Japan) Tsuneyuki Nakajima	24,440,839
