= Ocean Expo Golf Tournament =

The Ocean Expo Golf Tournament was a men's professional golf tournament that was held at Okinawa International Golf Club in Onna, Okinawa, Japan in 1975.

== Winners ==
Year	Winner	Score	To par	Margin of victory	Runner(s)-up	Ref
1975	(Japan) Yoshitaka Yamamoto	284	−4	1 stroke	(Taiwan) Hsieh Min-Nan (Japan) Hiroshi Ishii	
