= 1981 PGA of Japan Tour =

Golf tour season

1981 PGA of Japan Tour season
- Duration: 19 March 1981 – 6 December 1981
- Number of official events: 42
- Most wins: (Japan) Masahiro Kuramoto (4)
- Money list: (Japan) Isao Aoki

The 1981 PGA of Japan Tour was the ninth season of the PGA of Japan Tour, the main professional golf tour in Japan since it was formed in 1973.

== Schedule ==
The following table lists official events during the 1981 season.

Date	Tournament	Location	Purse (¥)	Winner (Note: The number in brackets after each winner's name is the number of PGA of Japan Tour events they had won up to and including that tournament. This information is only shown for PGA of Japan Tour members.)	Other tours (Note: AGC − Asia Golf Circuit.)	Notes
22 Mar	Shizuoka Open	Shizuoka	32,000,000	(Japan) Isao Aoki (30)		
5 Apr	Aso National Park Open	Kumamoto	15,000,000	(Japan) Saburo Fujiki (1)		
19 Apr	Kuzuha Kokusai Tournament	Osaka	15,000,000	(Japan) Kosaku Shimada (8)		
26 Apr	Dunlop International Open	Ibaraki	30,000,000	(Japan) Kosaku Shimada (9)	AGC	
3 May	Chunichi Crowns	Aichi	65,000,000	(Australia) Graham Marsh (12)		
10 May	Fujisankei Classic	Shizuoka	40,000,000	(Japan) Toshiharu Kawada (1)		
17 May	Japan PGA Match-Play Championship	Kanagawa	40,000,000	(Japan) Isao Aoki (31)		
24 May	Yomiuri Open	Hyōgo	30,000,000	(Japan) Namio Takasu (2)		
31 May	Mitsubishi Galant Tournament	Tochigi	35,000,000	(Taiwan) Lu Hsi-chuen (1)		
7 Jun	Tohoku Classic	Miyagi	30,000,000	(Japan) Teruo Sugihara (15)		
14 Jun	Sapporo Tokyu Open	Hokkaidō	30,000,000	(Taiwan) Chen Tze-chung (1)		
21 Jun	Pepsi-Wilson Tournament	Yamaguchi	25,000,000	(Australia) Graham Marsh (13)		
2 Jul	Naganoken Open	Nagano	17,000,000	(Japan) Fujio Kobayashi (3) (Japan) Masaji Kusakabe (7)		Title shared New to PGA of Japan Tour
5 Jul	JPGA East-West Tournament	Mie	12,000,000	(Japan) Shinsaku Maeda (5)		
12 Jul	Gunmaken Open	Gunma	6,000,000	(Japan) Satsuki Takahashi (1)		New to PGA of Japan Tour
19 Jul	Descente Cup Hokkoku Open	Ishikawa	25,000,000	(Japan) Saburo Fujiki (2)		
26 Jul	Niigata Open	Niigata	15,000,000	(Japan) Takahiro Takeyasu (1)		New to PGA of Japan Tour
2 Aug	Japan PGA Championship	Hokkaidō	32,000,000	(Japan) Isao Aoki (32)		
9 Aug	Mizuno Tournament	Ishikawa	22,000,000	(Japan) Kikuo Arai (1)		
16 Aug	Nihon Kokudo Keikaku Summers	Chiba	33,000,000	(Japan) Masahiro Kuramoto (2)		
23 Aug	Kanto Pro Championship	Shizuoka	20,000,000	(Japan) Seiichi Kanai (3)		
23 Aug	Kansai Pro Championship	Hiroshima	13,000,000	(Japan) Norio Suzuki (14)		
30 Aug	KBC Augusta	Fukuoka	32,000,000	(Taiwan) Hsieh Min-Nan (6)		
5 Sep	Chushikoku Open	Shimane	5,000,000	(Japan) Masahiro Kuramoto (3)		
6 Sep	Chubu Open	Aichi	12,000,000	(Japan) Shigeru Uchida (3)		
6 Sep	Kyusyu Open	Fukuoka	8,000,000	(Japan) Yurio Akitomi (3)		
6 Sep	Kanto Open	Tochigi	20,000,000	(Japan) Nobumitsu Yuhara (1)		
6 Sep	Kansai Open	Shiga	15,000,000	(Japan) Akio Kanemoto (3)		
6 Sep	Hokkaido Open	Hokkaidō	4,000,000	(Japan) Mitsuyoshi Goto (1)		
13 Sep	Suntory Open	Chiba	40,000,000	(United States) Bill Rogers (n/a)		
20 Sep	ANA Sapporo Open	Hokkaidō	30,000,000	(Japan) Masahiro Kuramoto (4)		
27 Sep	Hiroshima Open	Hiroshima	25,000,000	(Japan) Seiichi Kanai (4)		
4 Oct	Gene Sarazen Jun Classic	Tochigi	45,000,000	(Japan) Nobumitsu Yuhara (2)		
11 Oct	Tokai Classic	Aichi	35,000,000	(Japan) Masahiro Kuramoto (5)		
18 Oct	Golf Digest Tournament	Shizuoka	30,000,000	(Japan) Toyotake Nakao (1)		
25 Oct	Bridgestone Tournament	Chiba	50,000,000	(United States) Hale Irwin (n/a)		
1 Nov	Japan Open Golf Championship	Gifu	47,000,000	(Japan) Yutaka Hagawa (1)		
8 Nov	ABC Cup Japan vs USA	Hyōgo	36,000,000	(United States) Bobby Clampett (n/a)		
15 Nov	Toshiba Taiheiyo Masters	Shizuoka	70,000,000	(United States) Danny Edwards (n/a)		
22 Nov	Dunlop Phoenix Tournament	Miyazaki	80,000,000	(Spain) Seve Ballesteros (n/a)		
29 Nov	Casio World Open	Kagoshima	60,000,000	(United States) Lee Trevino (n/a)		New tournament
6 Dec	Golf Nippon Series	Tokyo	17,000,000	(Japan) Yutaka Hagawa (2)		

== Money list ==
The money list was based on prize money won during the season, calculated in Japanese yen.

Position	Player	Prize money (¥)
1	(Japan) Isao Aoki	57,262,941
2	(Japan) Masahiro Kuramoto	32,345,130
3	(Japan) Tsuneyuki Nakajima	29,600,960
4	(Japan) Tōru Nakamura	29,412,852
5	(Japan) Nobumitsu Yuhara	26,534,162
