= 1978 PGA of Japan Tour =

Golf tour season

1978 PGA of Japan Tour season
- Duration: 8 April 1978 – 3 December 1978
- Number of official events: 36
- Most wins: (Japan) Isao Aoki (6)
- Money list: (Japan) Isao Aoki

The 1978 PGA of Japan Tour was the sixth season of the PGA of Japan Tour, the main professional golf tour in Japan since it was formed in 1973.

== Schedule ==
The following table lists official events during the 1978 season.

Date	Tournament	Location	Purse (¥)	Winner (Note: The number in brackets after each winner's name is the number of PGA of Japan Tour events they had won up to and including that tournament. This information is only shown for PGA of Japan Tour members.)	Other tours (Note: AGC − Asia Golf Circuit.)	Notes
9 Apr	Aso National Park Open	Kumamoto	8,000,000	(Japan) Tadami Ueno (4)		New to PGA of Japan Tour
16 Apr	Kuzuha Kokusai Tournament	Osaka	10,000,000	(Japan) Akira Yabe (1)		New to PGA of Japan Tour
23 Apr	Dunlop International Open	Ibaraki	US$70,000	(Taiwan) Kuo Chie-Hsiung (1)	AGC	
30 Apr	Chunichi Crowns	Aichi	60,000,000	(Japan) Isao Aoki (15)		
7 May	Wizard Tournament	Wakayama	25,000,000	(Japan) Tōru Nakamura (5)		New to PGA of Japan Tour
14 May	Fujisankei Classic	Saitama	30,000,000	(Japan) Kosaku Shimada (8)		
21 May	Pepsi-Wilson Tournament	Yamaguchi	25,000,000	(Japan) Masashi Ozaki (20)		
28 May	Japan PGA Match-Play Championship	Kanagawa	30,000,000	(Japan) Isao Aoki (16)		
4 Jun	Tohoku Classic	Miyagi	23,000,000	(Japan) Haruo Yasuda (3)		
11 Jun	Mitsubishi Galant Tournament	Iwate	30,000,000	(Japan) Tōru Nakamura (6)		
18 Jun	Sapporo Tokyu Open	Hokkaidō	25,000,000	(Japan) Isao Aoki (17)		
25 Jun	Shizuoka Open	Shizuoka	25,000,000	(Taiwan) Hsieh Min-Nan (2)		
2 Jul	ANA Sapporo Open	Hokkaidō	30,000,000	(Japan) Teruo Sugihara (9)		
9 Jul	Kansai Open	Shiga	15,000,000	(Japan) Akio Kanemoto (1)		
14 Jul	Chushikoku Open	Hiroshima	3,000,000	(Japan) Seiji Katayama (1)		
15 Jul	Chubu Open	Mie	12,000,000	(Japan) Kouichi Inoue (1)		
16 Jul	Kyusyu Open	Fukuoka	5,000,000	(Japan) Norio Suzuki (8)		
16 Jul	Kanto Open	Niigata	20,000,000	(Japan) Seiichi Kanai (2)		
23 Jul	Gene Sarazen Jun Classic	Tochigi	35,000,000	(Japan) Kesahiko Uchida (1)		New to PGA of Japan Tour
6 Aug	Kansai Pro Championship	Osaka	10,000,000	(Japan) Teruo Sugihara (10)		
6 Aug	Kanto Pro Championship	Chiba	20,000,000	(Japan) Isao Aoki (18)		
13 Aug	Nihon Kokudo Keikaku Summers	Tochigi	30,000,000	(Japan) Yoshitaka Yamamoto (5)		New to PGA of Japan Tour
20 Aug	Japan PGA Championship	Hokkaidō	25,000,000	(Japan) Fujio Kobayashi (2)		
27 Aug	KBC Augusta	Fukuoka	32,000,000	(Japan) Kenichi Yamada (2)		
27 Aug	Hokkaido Open	Hokkaidō	2,850,000	(Japan) Koichi Uehara (2)		
10 Sep	Suntory Open	Chiba	40,000,000	(Japan) Akio Kanemoto (2)		
17 Sep	Sanpo Classic	Chiba	20,000,000	(Japan) Koichi Uehara (3)		
24 Sep	Hiroshima Open	Hiroshima	20,000,000	(Japan) Masashi Ozaki (21)		
8 Oct	Sumitomo Visa Taiheiyo Masters	Shizuoka	US$300,000	(United States) Gil Morgan (n/a)		
15 Oct	Tokai Classic	Aichi	32,000,000	(Japan) Masaji Kusakabe (3)		
21 Oct	Golf Digest Tournament	Shizuoka	20,000,000	(Japan) Masaru Amono (1)		
29 Oct	Bridgestone Tournament	Chiba	30,000,000	(Japan) Hiroshi Ishii (5)		
5 Nov	Japan Open Golf Championship	Kanagawa	65,000,000	(Spain) Seve Ballesteros (n/a)		
12 Nov	ABC Japan vs USA Golf Matches	Hyōgo	US$150,000	(Japan) Isao Aoki (19)		
26 Nov	Dunlop Phoenix Tournament	Miyazaki	60,000,000	(United States) Andy Bean (n/a)		
3 Dec	Golf Nippon Series	Tokyo	15,000,000	(Japan) Isao Aoki (20)		

== Money list ==
The money list was based on prize money won during the season, calculated in Japanese yen.

Position	Player	Prize money (¥)
1	(Japan) Isao Aoki	62,987,200
2	(Japan) Masashi Ozaki	29,017,286
3	(Japan) Kosaku Shimada	28,217,542
4	(Japan) Yoshitaka Yamamoto	26,850,810
5	(Japan) Tōru Nakamura	25,102,008
