= Gene Sarazen Jun Classic =

Tournament information
- Location: Tochigi, Japan
- Established: 1977
- Course: Jun Classic Country Club
- Par: 71
- Length: 7,355 yards (6,725 m)
- Tour: Japan Golf Tour
- Format: Stroke play
- Prize fund: ¥100,000,000
- Month played: September
- Final year: 1999

Tournament record score
- Aggregate: 270 Satoshi Higashi (1995); 270 Todd Hamilton (1999)
- To par: −18 as above

Final champion
- (Japan) Hajime Meshiai
- Location in Japan Location in the Tochigi Prefecture

The Gene Sarazen Jun Classic, sometimes shortened to Jun Classic, was a professional golf tournament that was held in Japan from 1977 to 1999. It was an event on the Japan Golf Tour from 1978. It was named in honour of Gene Sarazen, and played at the Jun Classic Country Club and the Rope Club in Tochigi Prefecture.

== Tournament hosts ==
Year(s)	Host course	Location
1977–1989, 1995–1996, 1999	Jun Classic Country Club	Ogawa, Tochigi
1990–1994, 1997–1998	Rope Club	Shioya, Tochigi

== Winners ==
Year	Winner	Score	To par	Margin of victory	Runner(s)-up	Ref.
Gene Sarazen Jun Classic
1999	(Japan) Hajime Meshiai	277	−11	Playoff	(Japan) Hirofumi Miyase	
1998	(United States) Todd Hamilton	270	−18	2 strokes	(Australia) Craig Parry	
1997	(Colombia) Eduardo Herrera	276	−12	1 stroke	(Japan) Toshiaki Odate	
1996	(Japan) Masashi Ozaki (5)	197 (Note: Shortened to 54 holes due to weather.)	−19	6 strokes	(Japan) Takaaki Fukuzawa	
1995	(Japan) Satoshi Higashi	270	−18	1 stroke	(Japan) Masashi Ozaki	
1994	(Paraguay) Carlos Franco	272	−16	2 strokes	(Japan) Tsuneyuki Nakajima	
1993	(Japan) Toru Suzuki	276	−12	1 stroke	(Japan) Tsuneyuki Nakajima (Japan) Masashi Ozaki	
1992	(Taiwan) Chen Tze-chung	277	−11	Playoff	(Japan) Masashi Ozaki	
1991	(Japan) Masashi Ozaki (4)	277	−11	Playoff	(Japan) Ryoken Kawagishi	
1990	(Japan) Naomichi Ozaki	273	−11	1 stroke	(Japan) Yoshinori Kaneko	
1989	(Japan) Tateo Ozaki	279	−9	Playoff	(Japan) Naomichi Ozaki	
1988	(Japan) Tōru Nakamura	240 (Note: Shortened to 63 holes due to weather.)	−12	4 strokes	(Japan) Nobuo Serizawa	
1987	(Japan) Masashi Ozaki (3)	204	−12	5 strokes	(Japan) Namio Takasu	
1986	(Japan) Masashi Ozaki (2)	279	−9	1 stroke	(Japan) Masahiro Kuramoto	
1985	(Japan) Kazushige Kono (Japan) Masahiro Kuramoto (United States) Payne Stewart	209	−7	Title shared (Note: Title shared after the final round was cancelled due to rain.)		
1984	(Japan) Shinsaku Maeda	278	−10	1 stroke	(Japan) Tateo Ozaki	
1983	(Japan) Masashi Ozaki	288	E	Playoff	(Japan) Masahiro Kuramoto	
1982	(Japan) Teruo Sugihara	275	−13	3 strokes	(Japan) Norio Suzuki	
1981	(Japan) Nobumitsu Yuhara	284	−4	1 stroke	(Japan) Takaaki Kono	
1980	(Japan) Isao Aoki (2)	277	−11	1 stroke	(Spain) Seve Ballesteros	
1979	(Taiwan) Kuo Chie-Hsiung	248	−4	Playoff	(Japan) Yasuhiro Funatogawa	
1978	(Japan) Kesahiko Uchida	281	−7	Playoff	(Japan) Katsuji Hasegawa (Japan) Shoji Kikuchi	
Gene Sarazen Golf Classic
1977	(Japan) Isao Aoki	277	−15	5 strokes	(Japan) Shinsaku Maeda	
