= Sapporo Tokyu Open =

Tournament information
- Location: Kitahiroshima, Hokkaido, Japan
- Established: 1973
- Course: Sapporo Kokusai Country Club
- Par: 72
- Length: 6,949 yards (6,354 m)
- Tour: Japan Golf Tour
- Format: Stroke play
- Prize fund: ¥100,000,000
- Month played: June
- Final year: 1998

Tournament record score
- Aggregate: 272 Toru Suzuki (1998)
- To par: −16 as above

Final champion
- (Japan) Toru Suzuki
- Location in Japan Location in Hokkaido

The Sapporo Tokyu Open was a professional golf tournament that was held in Japan from 1973 to 1998. It was an event on the Japan Golf Tour. It was held in June on the Shimamatsu course at Sapporo Kokusai Country Club in Kitahiroshima, Hokkaido from 1975. The Shimamatsu course previously hosted the All Japan Doubles, a team event, from 1969 to 1973.

== Tournament hosts ==
Year(s)	Host course	Location
1975–1998	Sapporo Kokusai Country Club (Shimamatsu course)	Kitahiroshima, Hokkaido
1974	Makomanai Country Club	Sapporo, Hokkaido
1973	Chitose Kuko Golf Club	Tomakomai, Hokkaido

== Winners ==
Year	Winner	Score	To par	Margin of victory	Runner(s)-up	Ref.
1998	(Japan) Toru Suzuki	272	−16	2 strokes	(United States) David Ishii	
1997	(Japan) Hirofumi Miyase	275	−13	5 strokes	(Japan) Hajime Meshiai	
1996	(Japan) Hajime Meshiai	279	−9	1 stroke	(Japan) Yoshimitsu Fukuzawa (Japan) Harumitsu Hamano (Japan) Yasunori Ida	
1995	(Paraguay) Carlos Franco	278	−10	1 stroke	(Japan) Shinji Ikeuchi (Japan) Kazuhiro Takami	
1994	(Japan) Yoshi Mizumaki	277	−11	1 stroke	(Colombia) Eduardo Herrera	
1993	(Australia) Brian Jones	274	−14	3 strokes	(Japan) Akiyoshi Ohmachi	
1992	(Japan) Nobumitsu Yuhara	281	−7	Playoff	(Japan) Nobuo Serizawa (Japan) Kazuhiro Takami	
1991	(Canada) Rick Gibson	280	−8	Playoff	(Japan) Masahiro Kuramoto (Japan) Shinsaku Maeda	
1990	(Japan) Tadao Nakamura	278	−10	1 stroke	(Taiwan) Chen Tze-chung (Australia) Brian Jones	
1989	(Australia) Graham Marsh (2)	282	−6	3 strokes	(Japan) Katsuji Hasegawa (Japan) Tsuneyuki Nakajima	
1988	(Japan) Naomichi Ozaki (2)	279	−9	3 strokes	(Japan) Tateo Ozaki	
1987	(United States) David Ishii	276	−12	3 strokes	(Japan) Tōru Nakamura	
1986	(Japan) Isao Aoki (4)	273	−15	3 strokes	(Japan) Shinsaku Maeda	
1985	(Japan) Teruo Sugihara	280	−8	Playoff	(Japan) Kinpachi Yoshimura	
1984	(Japan) Naomichi Ozaki	280	−8	2 strokes	(Japan) Isao Aoki	
1983	(Japan) Isao Aoki (3)	274	−14	7 strokes	(Australia) Terry Gale	
1982	(Japan) Yasuhiro Funatogawa	276	−12	7 strokes	(Japan) Kazuhiko Kato	
1981	(Taiwan) Chen Tze-chung	279	−9	3 strokes	(Australia) Terry Gale	
1980	(Taiwan) Hsieh Min-Nan	282	−6	1 stroke	(Australia) Graham Marsh (Japan) Masashi Ozaki	
1979	(Japan) Yasuhiro Miyamoto (2)	280	−8	2 strokes	(Japan) Teruo Sugihara	
1978	(Japan) Isao Aoki (2)	278	−10	5 strokes	(Taiwan) Hsieh Yung-yo	
1977	(Japan) Yasuhiro Miyamoto	283	−5	2 strokes	(Japan) Tsuneyuki Nakajima	
1976	(Australia) Bill Dunk	278	−10	2 strokes	(Taiwan) Hsieh Min-Nan (Australia) Graham Marsh	
1975	(Australia) Graham Marsh	280	−8	1 stroke	(Taiwan) Hsieh Yung-yo (Japan) Shozo Miyamoto	
1974	(Japan) Tōru Nakamura	278	−10	2 strokes	(Australia) Graham Marsh	
1973	(Japan) Isao Aoki	281	−7	1 stroke	(Taiwan) Lu Liang-Huan	
