= Kosaku Shimada =

Japanese golfer

Personal information
- Nationality: Japan
- Born: 7 May 1944 Takarazuka, Hyōgo, Japan
- Died: 3 November 2008 (aged 64)
- Height: 1.77 m (5 ft 10 in)
- Weight: 80 kg (180 lb; 13 st)

Career
- Sport: Golf
- Status: Professional
- Former tour: Japan Golf Tour
- Professional wins: 15

Number of wins by tour
- Japan Golf Tour: 9
- Other: 6

Best results in major championships
- Masters Tournament: DNP
- PGA Championship: DNP
- U.S. Open: DNP
- The Open Championship: T54: 1979

Kosaku Shimada (島田 幸作, Shimada Kosaku; 7 May 1944 – 3 November 2008) was a Japanese professional golfer.

== Career ==
Shimada, who used to belong to Takarazuka Golf Club, played on the Japan Golf Tour, winning nine times.

== Professional wins (15) ==
=== PGA of Japan Tour wins (9) ===
No.	Date	Tournament	Winning score	Margin of victory	Runner(s)-up
1	8 Sep 1973	Kansai Pro Championship	−16 (66-70-67-69=272)		
2	22 Sep 1974	Kansai Pro Championship (2)	−8 (69-69-70-72=280)		
3	27 Oct 1974	Tokai Classic	−12 (71-67-67-71=276)	2 strokes	(Japan) Teruo Sugihara
4	15 Nov 1976	Japan Open Golf Championship	−4 (73-75-71-69=288)	1 stroke	(Japan) Tōru Nakamura, (Japan) Takashi Murakami
5	7 Aug 1977	Kansai Pro Championship (3)	−8 (69-70-73-68=280)	Playoff	(Japan) Shinsaku Maeda
6	14 May 1978	Fujisankei Classic	−10 (70-71-69-68=278)	3 strokes	(Japan) Isao Aoki
7	19 Aug 1979	JPGA East-West Tournament	−11 (65-68=133)		
8	19 Apr 1981	Kuzuha Kokusai Tournament	−7 (68-65=133)	2 strokes	(Taiwan) Lu Liang-Huan, (Japan) Nobumitsu Yuhara
9	26 Apr 1981	Dunlop International Open^{1}	−2 (67-73-74-72=286)	2 strokes	(United States) Payne Stewart, (Japan) Koichi Uehara, (Japan) Akira Yabe

^{1}Co-sanctioned by the Asia Golf Circuit

PGA of Japan Tour playoff record (1–2)

No.	Year	Tournament	Opponent(s)	Result
1	1973	Pepsi-Wilson Tournament	(Japan) Isao Aoki	Lost to birdie on sixth extra hole
2	1975	Hiroshima Open	(Taiwan) Lu Liang-Huan, (Japan) Tōru Nakamura	Lu won two-hole aggregate playoff; Lu: E (3-4=7), Nakamura: +2 (5-4=9), Shimada: +2 (4-5=9)
3	1977	Kansai Pro Championship	(Japan) Shinsaku Maeda	Won with par on first extra hole

=== Asia Golf Circuit wins (1) ===
No.	Date	Tournament	Winning score	Margin of victory	Runners-up
1	26 Apr 1981	Dunlop International Open^{1}	−2 (67-73-74-72=286)	2 strokes	(United States) Payne Stewart, (Japan) Koichi Uehara, (Japan) Akira Yabe

^{1}Co-sanctioned by the PGA of Japan Tour

Asia Golf Circuit playoff record (0–1)

No.	Year	Tournament	Opponent	Result
1	1971	Yomiuri International	(Japan) Haruo Yasuda	Lost to bogey on third extra hole

=== Other wins (6) ===
- 1968 Japan PGA Championship, Grand Monarch
- 1970 Kansai Open
- 1975 Japan vs Great Britain and Ireland Match (Individual)
- 1979 Asahi Toy Kyosen Invitational
- 1984 Acom Team Championship (with Isao Isozaki)

== Team appearances ==
- World Cup (representing Japan): 1975, 1977
