= 1976 PGA of Japan Tour =

Golf tour season

1976 PGA of Japan Tour season
- Duration: 22 April 1976 – 5 December 1976
- Number of official events: 31
- Most wins: (Japan) Shinsaku Maeda (3) (Australia) Graham Marsh (3) (Japan) Takashi Murakami (3) (Japan) Masashi Ozaki (3) (Japan) Norio Suzuki (3)
- Money list: (Japan) Isao Aoki

The 1976 PGA of Japan Tour was the fourth season of the PGA of Japan Tour, the main professional golf tour in Japan since it was formed in 1973.

== Schedule ==
The following table lists official events during the 1976 season.

Date	Tournament	Location	Purse (¥)	Winner (Note: The number in brackets after each winner's name is the number of PGA of Japan Tour events they had won up to and including that tournament. This information is only shown for PGA of Japan Tour members.)	Other tours (Note: AGC − Asia Golf Circuit.)	Notes
25 Apr	Sobu International Open	Chiba	US$75,000	(Philippines) Ben Arda (3)	AGC	
2 May	Chunichi Crowns	Aichi	60,000,000	(Australia) David Graham (n/a)		
16 May	Fujisankei Classic	Saitama	30,000,000	(Japan) Norio Suzuki (4)		
23 May	Pepsi-Wilson Tournament	Yamaguchi	25,000,000	(Australia) Peter Thomson (n/a)		
30 May	Japan PGA Match-Play Championship	Kanagawa	30,000,000	(Japan) Kazuo Yoshikawa (1)		
6 Jun	Dunlop Tournament	Ishikawa	20,000,000	(Japan) Yoshikazu Yokoshima (1)		
13 Jun	Sapporo Tokyu Open	Hokkaidō	20,000,000	(Australia) Bill Dunk (2)		
20 Jun	Tohoku Classic	Miyagi	23,000,000	(Japan) Haruo Yasuda (2)		
4 Jul	ANA Sapporo Open	Hokkaidō	30,000,000	(Japan) Takashi Murakami (8)		
11 Jul	Kanto Open	Saitama	15,000,000	(Japan) Masashi Ozaki (13)		
16 Jul	Chushikoku Open	Hiroshima	2,100,000	(Japan) Tadami Ueno (2)		
16 Jul	Kyusyu Open	Fukuoka	2,200,000	(Japan) Norio Suzuki (5)		
17 Jul	Chubu Open	Fukui	3,000,000	(Taiwan) Chen Chien-chin (1)		
18 Jul	Kansai Open	Shiga	10,000,000	(Japan) Shinsaku Maeda (2)		
25 Jul	Shizuoka Open	Shizuoka	25,000,000	(Japan) Norio Suzuki (6)		
1 Aug	Kansai Pro Championship	Kagawa	10,000,000	(Japan) Shinsaku Maeda (3)		
8 Aug	Kanto Pro Championship	Akita	15,000,000	(Japan) Takashi Murakami (9)		
29 Aug	KBC Augusta	Fukuoka	20,000,000	(Australia) Graham Marsh (7)		
5 Sep	Hiroshima Open	Hiroshima	20,000,000	(Japan) Masashi Ozaki (14)		
12 Sep	Suntory Open	Chiba	35,000,000	(Australia) Graham Marsh (8)		
19 Sep	Sanpo Classic	Chiba	20,000,000	(Japan) Masashi Ozaki (15)		
26 Sep	Japan PGA Championship	Kumamoto	20,000,000	(Japan) Seiichi Kanai (1)		
10 Oct	Taiheiyo Club Masters	Chiba	US$300,000	(United States) Jerry Pate (n/a)		
17 Oct	Tokai Classic	Aichi	32,000,000	(Japan) Isao Aoki (12)		
24 Oct	Golf Digest Tournament	Shizuoka	20,000,000	(Japan) Tsuneyuki Nakajima (1)		
31 Oct	Bridgestone Tournament	Chiba	30,000,000	(Japan) Takashi Murakami (10)		
7 Nov	Sony Charity Classic	Kanagawa	30,000,000	(Japan) Yoshitaka Yamamoto (3)		
15 Nov	Japan Open Golf Championship	Ibaraki	65,000,000	(Japan) Kosaku Shimada (4)		
21 Nov	Golf Nippon Series	Tokyo	15,000,000	(Japan) Shinsaku Maeda (4)		
28 Nov	Dunlop Phoenix Tournament	Miyazaki	60,000,000	(Australia) Graham Marsh (9)		
5 Dec	ABC Japan vs USA Golf Matches	Hyōgo	23,000,000	(United States) Tom Watson (n/a)		

== Money list ==
The money list was based on prize money won during the season, calculated in Japanese yen.

Position	Player	Prize money (¥)
1	(Japan) Isao Aoki	40,985,801
2	(Japan) Takashi Murakami	36,469,936
3	(Japan) Masashi Ozaki	24,608,872
4	(Japan) Kosaku Shimada	21,824,670
5	(Japan) Yoshitaka Yamamoto	21,816,308
