= Tokyo Charity Classic =

Tournament information
- Location: Greater Tokyo, Japan
- Established: 1973
- Par: 72
- Tour: Japan Golf Tour
- Format: Stroke play
- Prize fund: ¥30,000,000
- Final year: 1976

Tournament record score
- Aggregate: 274 Fumio Tanaka (1973)
- To par: −14 as above

Final champion
- (Japan) Yoshitaka Yamamoto

The Tokyo Charity Classic was a professional golf tournament that was held in Japan from 1973 to 1976. It was an event on the Japan Golf Tour and hosted at different courses in the Greater Tokyo Area.

== Winners ==
| Year | Winner | Score | To par | Margin of victory | Runner(s)-up | Venue | Ref. |
Sony Charity Classic
| 1976 | (Japan) Yoshitaka Yamamoto | 282 | −6 | 1 stroke | (Taiwan) Lu Liang-Huan | Yokohama (West) | |
| 1975 | (Japan) Masaji Kusakabe | 209 (Note: Tournament reduced to 54 holes due to bad weather.) | −7 | 2 strokes | (United States) Danny Edwards (Japan) Hiroshi Ishii (Japan) Takashi Murakami | Yokohama (West) | |
Tokyo Charity Classic
| 1974 | (Japan) Haruo Yasuda | 275 | −13 | Playoff (Note: Yasuda won with a birdie on the first hole of a sudden-death playoff after Murakami hit his tee shot out-of-bounds.) | (Japan) Takashi Murakami | Narashino | |
Aero Masters
| 1973 | (Japan) Fumio Tanaka | 274 | −14 | 1 stroke | (Japan) Isaro Ohba | Fuchu | |
