= 1970 World Cup (men's golf) =

Coordinates: 34.486°S 58.533°W

Tournament information
- Dates: 12–15 November
- Location: Buenos Aires, Argentina
- Course: The Jockey Club
- Format: 72 holes stroke play combined score

Statistics
- Par: 72
- Length: 6,700 yards (6,100 m)
- Field: 43 two-man teams
- Cut: None
- Prize fund: US$6,300
- Winner's share: $2,000 team $1,000 individual

Champion
- Australia; Bruce Devlin & David Graham
- 544 (−32)

The 1970 World Cup took place 12–15 November at The Jockey Club in San Isidro 28 kilometers north of the center of Buenos Aires, Argentina. It was the 18th World Cup event.

The tournament was a 72-hole stroke play team event with 43 teams. 44 teams were invited, but the Czechoslovakia team of amateurs Jiri Dvorak and Jan Kunšta withdraw from the tournament before it began. Each team consisted of two players from a country. The combined score of each team determined the team results.

The Australia team of Bruce Devlin and David Graham won, with a record aggregate of 544, by a record ten stroke margin over the home team Argentina. Australia held a record advantage of 19 strokes going into the final round. This was the third victory for Australia in the history of the World Cup, until 1967 named the Canada Cup. The individual competition was won by Roberto De Vicenzo, Argentina one stroke ahead of Graham. The event was dedicated to the 47-year-old home hero De Vicenzo, who had participated in 15 Canada Cup/World Cup events played and shared in Argentina's victory in the 1953 inaugural event.

Henrik Lund, Denmark, made a hole-in-one on the par 3 12th hole in the first round.

== Teams ==
This list is incomplete.

Country	Players
Argentina	Roberto De Vicenzo and Vicente Fernández
Australia	Bruce Devlin and David Graham
Austria	Oswald Gartenmaier and Rudolf Hauser
Belgium	Donald Swaelens and Flory Van Donck
Brazil	Mário Gonzalez and José Maria Gonzalez
Canada	Al Balding and Bob Cox Jr
Chile	Francisco Cerda and Rafael Jerez
China	Hsieh Min-Nan and Hsieh Yung-yo
Colombia	Rogelio Gonzalez and Heracilo Valenzuela
Denmark	Herluf Hansen and Henrik Lund
Dominican Republic	
England	Peter Butler and Tony Jacklin
France	Jean Garaïalde and Bernard Pascassio
Greece	
Ireland	Hugh Jackson and Jimmy Martin
Italy	Manuel Canessa and Ettore Della Torre
Jamaica	
Japan	Takaaki Kono and Haruo Yasuda
Libya	Muftah Salem and Hussein Abdulmullah
Mexico	Ramon Cruz and Reyes Espinosa
Morocco	
Netherlands	Jan Dorrestein and Bertus van Mook
New Zealand	Brian Boys and John Lister
Panama	
Peru	Rodolfo Coscia and Hugo Nari
Philippines	Ben Arda and Eleuterio Nival
Portugal	Manuel Ribeiro and Joaguin Ridrigues
Puerto Rico	Manuel Camacho and Jose Rivera
Romania	Dumitru Munteanu and Paul Tomita
Scotland	Ronnie Shade and George Will
Singapore	Alvin Liau and Phua Thin Kiay
South Africa	Allan Henning and Harold Henning
South Korea	Hahn Sang-chan and Lee Il-hahn
Spain	Ángel Gallardo and Ramón Sota
Sweden	Åke Bergquist and Tony Lidholm
Switzerland	Otto Schoepfer and Ronald Tingley
Thailand	Sukree Onsham and Uthai Thabvibul
United Arab Republic	Cherif El-Sayed Cherif and Mohammed Said Moussa
United States	Dave Stockton and Lee Trevino
Uruguay	Enrique Fernandez and ?
Venezuela	
Wales	Brian Huggett and Dave Thomas
West Germany	Roman Krause and Toni Kugelmuller

(a) denotes amateur

== Scores ==
Team

Place	Country	Score	To par	Money (US$) (per team)
1	Australia	131-136-131-146=544	−32	2,000
2	Argentina	134-143-140-137=554	−22	1,000
3	South Africa	142-146-137-138=563	−13	800
4	United States	137-146-139-143=565	−11	400
T5	Italy	147-148-139-138=572	−4	
T5	Wales	144-143-139-146=572	−4	
T7	England	141-146-142-146=575	−1	
T7	Spain	144-146-137-148=575	−1	
9	Scotland	139-149-143-145=576	E	
T10	France	142-143-143-150=578	+2	
T10	Japan	143-142-145-148=578	+2	
12	Philippines	145-141-147-152=585	+9	
13	Mexico	147-148-144-147=586	+10	
T14	Chile	144-145-147-151=587	+11	
T14	New Zealand	140-152-144-151=587	+11	
T14	China	142-153-147-145=587	+11	
17	Ireland	144-145-147-152=588	+12	
18	Denmark	141-141-151-157=590	+14	
19	West Germany	149-145-148-151=593	+17	
T20	Canada	147-147-148-153=595	+19	
T20	Colombia	149-150-148-148=595	+19	
T20	Thailand	142- =595	+19	
23	Netherlands	141-152-152-151=596	+20	
24	South Korea	147-150-151-149=597	+21	
25	Uruguay	598	+22	
26	Belgium	149-148-151-153=601	+25	
27	Brazil	145-152-148-157=602	+26	
T28	Puerto Rico	142-159-155-148=604	+28	
T28	United Arab Republic	604	+28	
30	Sweden	607	+31	
T31	Jamaica	612	+36	
T31	Peru	612	+36	
T31	Venezuela	612	+36	
T34	Panama	613	+37	
T34	Portugal	153-154-156-150=613	+37	
36	Dominican Republic	616	+40	
37	Austria	622	+46	
38	Singapore	624	+48	
39	Greece	626	+50	
40	Morocco			
41	Switzerland	653	+77	
42	Libya	656	+80	
43	Romania	727	+151	

International Trophy

Place	Player	Country	Score	To par	Money (US$)
1	Roberto De Vicenzo	Argentina	64-67-68-70=269	−19	1,000
2	David Graham	Australia	68-67-65-73=270	−18	500
3	Bruce Devlin	Australia	66-69-66-73=274	−14	400
T4	Allan Henning	South Africa	68-72-69-70=279	−9	100
T4	Dave Stockton	United States	67-73-69-70=279	−9	100
6	Jean Garaïalde	France	71-69-73-69=282	−6	
7	Ettore Della Torre	Italy	73-75-69-66=283	−5	
T8	Peter Butler	England	72-73-69-70=284	−4	
T8	Francesco Cerda	Chile	72-69-71-72=284	−4	
T8	Harold Henning	South Africa	74-74-68-68=284	−4	
T8	Haruo Yasuda	Japan	70-72-69-73=284	−4	
