= 1979 PGA of Japan Tour =

Golf tour season

1979 PGA of Japan Tour season
- Duration: 29 March 1979 – 2 December 1979
- Number of official events: 37
- Most wins: (Japan) Isao Aoki (4)
- Money list: (Japan) Isao Aoki

The 1979 PGA of Japan Tour was the seventh season of the PGA of Japan Tour, the main professional golf tour in Japan since it was formed in 1973.

== Schedule ==
The following table lists official events during the 1979 season.

| Date | Tournament | Location | Purse (¥) | Winner (Note: The number in brackets after each winner's name is the number of PGA of Japan Tour events they had won up to and including that tournament. This information is only shown for PGA of Japan Tour members.) | Other tours (Note: AGC − Asia Golf Circuit.) | Notes |
|---|---|---|---|---|---|---|
| 1 Apr | Shizuoka Open | Shizuoka | 25,000,000 | (Japan) Akira Yabe (2) | | |
| 8 Apr | Aso National Park Open | Kumamoto | 10,000,000 | (Japan) Takashi Kurihara (3) | | |
| 15 Apr | Kuzuha Kokusai Tournament | Osaka | 12,000,000 | (Taiwan) Hsieh Min-Nan (3) | | |
| 22 Apr | Dunlop International Open | Ibaraki | US$100,000 | (Japan) Hiroshi Ishii (6) | AGC | |
| 29 Apr | Chunichi Crowns | Aichi | 60,000,000 | (Japan) Isao Aoki (21) | | |
| 13 May | Fujisankei Classic | Saitama | 30,000,000 | (Japan) Shoichi Sato (1) | | |
| 20 May | Japan PGA Match-Play Championship | Kanagawa | 30,000,000 | (Japan) Isao Aoki (22) | | |
| 27 May | Yomiuri Open | Hyōgo | 30,000,000 | (Japan) Teruo Sugihara (11) | | |
| 3 Jun | Mitsubishi Galant Tournament | Ibaraki | 30,000,000 | (Japan) Tōru Nakamura (7) | | |
| 10 Jun | Tohoku Classic | Miyagi | 25,000,000 | (Japan) Tōru Nakamura (8) | | |
| 17 Jun | Sapporo Tokyu Open | Hokkaidō | 25,000,000 | (Japan) Yasuhiro Miyamoto (7) | | |
| 24 Jun | Pepsi-Wilson Tournament | Aomori | 25,000,000 | (Myanmar) Mya Aye (2) | | |
| 1 Jul | Kanto Pro Championship | Ibaraki | 20,000,000 | (Japan) Isao Aoki (23) | | |
| 1 Jul | Kansai Pro Championship | Ishikawa | 12,000,000 | (Japan) Tōru Nakamura (9) | | |
| 5 Aug | Nihon Kokudo Keikaku Summers | Tochigi | 30,000,000 | (Japan) Norio Mikami (1) | | |
| 12 Aug | Mizuno Tournament | Ishikawa | 20,000,000 | (Japan) Mitsuhiro Kitta (1) | | New to PGA of Japan Tour |
| 19 Aug | JPGA East-West Tournament | Miyagi | 12,000,000 | (Japan) Kosaku Shimada (7) | | |
| 26 Aug | KBC Augusta | Fukuoka | 32,000,000 | (Japan) Masaji Kusakabe (4) | | |
| 27 Aug | Hokkaido Open | Hokkaidō | 4,100,000 | (Japan) Shoichi Sato (2) | | |
| 2 Sep | ANA Sapporo Open | Hokkaidō | 30,000,000 | (Australia) Graham Marsh (11) | | |
| 9 Sep | Suntory Open | Chiba | 40,000,000 | (Japan) Masaji Kusakabe (5) | | |
| 16 Sep | Japan PGA Championship | Ibaraki | 25,000,000 | (Taiwan) Hsieh Min-Nan (4) | | |
| 23 Sep | Kansai Open | Hyōgo | 15,000,000 | (Japan) Yasuhiro Miyamoto (8) | | |
| 23 Sep | Kanto Open | Gunma | 20,000,000 | (Japan) Masaru Amono (2) | | |
| 23 Sep | Kyusyu Open | Nagasaki | 5,000,000 | (Japan) Yurio Akitomi (1) | | |
| 23 Sep | Chushikoku Open | Yamaguchi | 5,050,000 | (Japan) Hideto Shigenobu (1) | | |
| 23 Sep | Chubu Open | Gifu | 12,000,000 | (Japan) Kenichi Matsuoka (1) | | |
| 30 Sep | Hiroshima Open | Hiroshima | 20,000,000 | (Japan) Yoshitaka Yamamoto (6) | | |
| 7 Oct | Gene Sarazen Jun Classic | Tochigi | 35,000,000 | (Taiwan) Kuo Chie-Hsiung (2) | | |
| 14 Oct | Tokai Classic | Aichi | 33,500,000 | (Japan) Tsutomu Irie (1) | | |
| 21 Oct | Golf Digest Tournament | Shizuoka | 25,000,000 | (Taiwan) Kuo Chie-Hsiung (3) | | |
| 28 Oct | Bridgestone Tournament | Chiba | 30,000,000 | (United States) Lanny Wadkins (n/a) | | |
| 4 Nov | Japan Open Golf Championship | Shiga | 50,000,000 | (Taiwan) Kuo Chie-Hsiung (4) | | |
| 11 Nov | ABC Japan vs USA Golf Matches | Hyōgo | 30,000,000 | (United States) Tom Purtzer (n/a) | | |
| 18 Nov | Taiheiyo Club Masters | Shizuoka | US$300,000 | (Japan) Norio Suzuki (9) | | |
| 25 Nov | Dunlop Phoenix Tournament | Miyazaki | 60,000,000 | (United States) Bobby Wadkins (n/a) | | |
| 2 Dec | Golf Nippon Series | Tokyo | 16,000,000 | (Japan) Isao Aoki (24) | | |

== Money list ==
The money list was based on prize money won during the season, calculated in Japanese yen.

| Position | Player | Prize money (¥) |
|---|---|---|
| 1 | (Japan) Isao Aoki | 45,554,211 |
| 2 | (Japan) Tōru Nakamura | 34,707,816 |
| 3 | (Japan) Masaji Kusakabe | 30,521,932 |
| 4 | (Japan) Norio Suzuki | 29,258,974 |
| 5 | (Taiwan) Hsieh Min-Nan | 23,471,810 |
