= Haruo Yasuda =

Japanese golfer

Personal information
- Nationality: Japan
- Born: 19 January 1943 (age 83) Tokyo, Japan
- Height: 1.70 m (5 ft 7 in)
- Weight: 74 kg (163 lb; 11.7 st)

Career
- Sport: Golf
- Status: Professional
- Former tours: Japan Golf Tour; Asia Golf Circuit
- Professional wins: 17

Number of wins by tour
- Japan Golf Tour: 6
- Other: 11

Best results in major championships
- Masters Tournament: DNP
- PGA Championship: DNP
- U.S. Open: DNP
- The Open Championship: CUT: 1981

Haruo Yasuda (安田 春雄, Yasuda Haruo; born 19 January 1943) is a Japanese professional golfer.

== Professional career ==
Yasuda played on the Japan Golf Tour, winning six times. He also won several pre-tour events in Japan and on the Asia Golf Circuit. In 1968, he nearly won the Thailand Open but double-bogeyed the final hole giving Australian Randall Vines the win.

== Professional wins (17) ==
=== PGA of Japan Tour wins (6) ===
No.	Date	Tournament	Winning score	Margin of victory	Runner(s)-up
1	21 Jul 1974	Tokyo Charity Classic	−13 (69-68-69-69=275)	Playoff	(Japan) Takashi Murakami
2	20 Jun 1976	Tohoku Classic	−11 (74-69-67-67=277)	Playoff	(Japan) Fumio Tanaka
3	4 Jun 1978	Tohoku Classic (2)	−5 (73-66-73-71=283)	1 stroke	(Japan) Shinsaku Maeda, (Japan) Masashi Ozaki
4	18 May 1980	Japan PGA Match-Play Championship	2 and 1		(Japan) Tsuneyuki Nakajima
5	8 Jun 1980	Tohoku Classic (3)	−15 (66-70-71-66=273)	2 strokes	(Japan) Shinsaku Maeda
6	27 May 1984	Mitsubishi Galant Tournament	−13 (68-68-69-70=275)	4 strokes	(Japan) Kouichi Inoue, (Japan) Yoshitaka Yamamoto

PGA of Japan Tour playoff record (2–4)

No.	Year	Tournament	Opponent(s)	Result
1	1974	Tokyo Charity Classic	(Japan) Takashi Murakami	Won with birdie on first extra hole
2	1976	Tohoku Classic	(Japan) Fumio Tanaka	Won with par on first extra hole
3	1976	KBC Augusta	(Australia) Graham Marsh	Lost to birdie on first extra hole
4	1976	Japan PGA Championship	(Japan) Shichiro Enomoto, (Taiwan) Hsieh Min-Nan, (Japan) Seiichi Kanai	Kanai won with par on third extra hole Hsieh and Yasuda eliminated by par on first hole
5	1979	Aso National Park Open	(Japan) Takashi Kurihara, (Japan) Shinsaku Maeda	
6	1983	KSB Setonaikai Open	(Japan) Kenji Sogame	Lost after concession before playoff

=== Asia Golf Circuit wins (4) ===
No.	Date	Tournament	Winning score	Margin of victory	Runner(s)-up
1	2 Mar 1969	Philippine Open	−9 (68-71-71-69=279)	1 stroke	(Philippines) Ben Arda, (Taiwan) Hsieh Min-Nan
2	7 Mar 1971	Singapore Open	−7 (69-70-69-69=277)	2 strokes	(Japan) Takaaki Kono, (Australia) Peter Thomson
3	25 Apr 1971	Yomiuri International	−6 (71-66-72-73=282)	Playoff	(Japan) Kosaku Shimada
4	9 Apr 1972	Taiwan Open	−4 (68-73-70-73=284)	Playoff	(Taiwan) Kuo Chie-Hsiung

Asia Golf Circuit playoff record (2–0)

No.	Year	Tournament	Opponent	Result
1	1971	Yomiuri International	(Japan) Kosaku Shimada	Won with bogey on third extra hole
2	1972	Taiwan Open	(Taiwan) Kuo Chie-Hsiung	Won with birdie on fifth extra hole

=== Other wins (7) ===
- 1968 Chunichi Crowns
- 1969 Kanto Open, Kanto Pro Championship
- 1970 Chunichi Crowns, Dunlop Tournament
- 1972 Golf Digest Tournament, Shizuoka Open

== Team appearances ==
- World Cup (representing Japan): 1969, 1970, 1971, 1980
