= Yasuhiro Funatogawa =

Japanese golfer (born 1955)

Personal information
- Nationality: Japan
- Born: 15 April 1955 (age 71) Saitama Prefecture, Japan
- Height: 1.78 m (5 ft 10 in)
- Weight: 72 kg (159 lb; 11.3 st)

Career
- Sport: Golf
- Status: Professional
- Former tour: Japan Golf Tour
- Professional wins: 4

Number of wins by tour
- Japan Golf Tour: 4

Best results in major championships
- Masters Tournament: DNP
- PGA Championship: DNP
- U.S. Open: DNP
- The Open Championship: CUT: 1980

Yasuhiro Funatogawa (born 15 April 1955) is a Japanese professional golfer.

== Career ==
Funatogawa played on the Japan Golf Tour, winning four times.

== Professional wins (4) ==
=== PGA of Japan Tour wins (4) ===
No.	Date	Tournament	Winning score	Margin of victory	Runner(s)-up
1	24 Aug 1980	Nihon Kokudo Keikaku Summers	+1 (68-70-68=206) (Note: Shortened to 54 holes due to weather.)	Playoff	(Taiwan) Hsieh Min-Nan
2	13 Jun 1982	Sapporo Tokyu Open	−12 (68-69-67-72=276)	7 strokes	(Japan) Kazuhiko Kato
3	20 May 1984	Pepsi Ube Open	−16 (68-68-70-66=272)	2 strokes	(Japan) Kikuo Arai, (Japan) Naomichi Ozaki
4	16 Nov 1986	Visa Taiheiyo Club Masters	−14 (67-68-70-69=274)	2 strokes	(United States) Larry Nelson

PGA of Japan Tour playoff record (1–1)

No.	Year	Tournament	Opponent	Result
1	1979	Gene Sarazen Jun Classic	(Taiwan) Kuo Chie-Hsiung	Lost to birdie on fifth extra hole
2	1980	Nihon Kokudo Keikaku Summers	(Taiwan) Hsieh Min-Nan	Won with par on first extra hole

== Results in major championships ==
Tournament	1980
The Open Championship	CUT

CUT = missed the half-way cut
Note: Funatogawa only played in The Open Championship.
