= Hsieh Min-Nan =

Taiwanese professional golfer (born 1940)

Personal information
- Nickname: Tony
- Nationality: Taiwan
- Born: 9 August 1940 (age 86) Taipei, Taiwan
- Height: 1.75 m (5 ft 9 in)
- Weight: 68 kg (150 lb; 10.7 st)

Career
- Sport: Golf
- Turned professional: 1965
- Current tours: Japan Golf Tour; Asia Golf Circuit
- Professional wins: 53

Number of wins by tour
- Japan Golf Tour: 11
- Asian Tour: 5 (Asia Golf Circuit)
- Other: 37

Best results in major championships
- Masters Tournament: CUT: 1983
- PGA Championship: DNP
- U.S. Open: DNP
- The Open Championship: T31: 1972

Achievements and awards
- Asia Golf Circuit Order of Merit winner: 1971, 1975, 1977

Hsieh Min-Nan (Chinese: 謝敏男, born 9 August 1940), also known as Tony Hsieh, is a Taiwanese professional golfer.

== Career ==
Hsieh won 11 events on the Japan Golf Tour. He won the 1972 World Cup with teammate Lu Liang-Huan and also won the individual title. He won many other tournaments in Asia and was the Asia Golf Circuit overall champion on three occasions, in 1971, 1975 and 1977.

== Professional wins (53) ==
=== PGA of Japan Tour wins (11) ===
| No. | Date | Tournament | Winning score | Margin of victory | Runner(s)-up |
|---|---|---|---|---|---|
| 1 | 3 Aug 1975 | Kanto Pro Championship | −14 (65-71-67-71=274) | 2 strokes | (Japan) Isao Aoki, (Japan) Masashi Ozaki |
| 2 | 25 Jun 1978 | Shizuoka Open | −8 (68-68-74-70=280) | 3 strokes | (Japan) Isao Aoki |
| 3 | 15 Apr 1979 | Kuzuha Kokusai Tournament | −6 (68-66=134) | 2 strokes | (Japan) Fujio Kobayashi |
| 4 | 16 Sep 1979 | Japan PGA Championship | −16 (67-68-66-71=272) | 1 stroke | (Japan) Teruo Sugihara |
| 5 | 15 Jun 1980 | Sapporo Tokyu Open | −6 (74-70-68-70=282) | 1 stroke | (Australia) Graham Marsh, (Japan) Masashi Ozaki |
| 6 | 30 Aug 1981 | KBC Augusta | −9 (69-68-73-69=279) | Playoff | (Taiwan) Chen Tze-chung, (Japan) Nobumitsu Yuhara |
| 7 | 10 Oct 1982 | Tokai Classic | −14 (64-71-72-67=274) | 5 strokes | (United States) Larry Nelson |
| 8 | 17 Oct 1982 | Golf Digest Tournament | −14 (64-70-65-75=274) | 1 stroke | (Japan) Akira Yabe |
| 9 | 24 Oct 1982 | Bridgestone Tournament | −9 (64-70-71-74=279) | Playoff | (Japan) Kikuo Arai |
| 10 | 21 Apr 1985 | Bridgestone Aso Open | −8 (66-70-71-73=280) | Playoff | (Japan) Masahiro Kuramoto |
| 11 | 4 Aug 1985 | NST Niigata Open | −12 (65-70-68-69=272) | Playoff | (Japan) Yoshihisa Iwashita |

PGA of Japan Tour playoff record (4–7)

| No. | Year | Tournament | Opponent(s) | Result |
|---|---|---|---|---|
| 1 | 1976 | Japan PGA Championship | (Japan) Shichiro Enomoto, (Japan) Seiichi Kanai, (Japan) Haruo Yasuda | Kanai won with par on third extra hole Hsieh and Yasuda eliminated by par on first hole |
| 2 | 1976 | Bridgestone Tournament | (Japan) Masaji Kusakabe, (Japan) Takashi Murakami | Murakami won with par on third extra hole Hsieh eliminated by par on second hole |
| 3 | 1978 | Kanto Open | (Japan) Minoru Hiyoshi, (Japan) Seiichi Kanai | |
| 4 | 1979 | Tohoku Classic | (Japan) Tōru Nakamura | Lost to birdie on second extra hole |
| 5 | 1980 | Nihon Kokudo Keikaku Summers | (Japan) Yasuhiro Funatogawa | Lost to par on first extra hole |
| 6 | 1981 | KBC Augusta | (Taiwan) Chen Tze-chung, (Japan) Nobumitsu Yuhara | Won with birdie on second extra hole |
| 7 | 1982 | Niigata Open | (Japan) Yoshitaka Yamamoto | Lost to par on fourth extra hole |
| 8 | 1982 | Bridgestone Tournament | (Japan) Kikuo Arai | Won with birdie on second extra hole |
| 9 | 1984 | Fujisankei Classic | (Japan) Tateo Ozaki | Lost to par on first extra hole |
| 10 | 1985 | Bridgestone Aso Open | (Japan) Masahiro Kuramoto | |
| 11 | 1985 | NST Niigata Open | (Japan) Yoshihisa Iwashita | Won with birdie on first extra hole |

=== Asia Golf Circuit wins (5) ===
| No. | Date | Tournament | Winning score | Margin of victory | Runner-up |
|---|---|---|---|---|---|
| 1 | 26 Mar 1972 | Thailand Open | −10 (71-68-70-69=278) | 6 strokes | (Taiwan) Hsu Sheng-san |
| 2 | 23 Apr 1972 | Sobu International Open | −9 (71-72-72-64=279) | 2 strokes | (Philippines) Ben Arda |
| 3 | 27 Feb 1977 | Hong Kong Open | E (70-70-70-70=280) | 1 stroke | (Japan) Teruo Sugihara |
| 4 | 10 Apr 1977 | Taiwan Open | −12 (71-67-68-70=276) | 2 strokes | (Taiwan) Kuo Chie-Hsiung |
| 5 | 21 Feb 1982 | Philippine Open | +4 (72-72-76-72=292) | Playoff | (Taiwan) Hsu Sheng-san |

Asia Golf Circuit playoff record (1–2)

| No. | Year | Tournament | Opponent(s) | Result |
|---|---|---|---|---|
| 1 | 1975 | Taiwan Open | (Philippines) Ben Arda, (Taiwan) Kuo Chie-Hsiung | Kuo won with birdie on fourth extra hole |
| 2 | 1982 | Philippine Open | (Taiwan) Hsu Sheng-san | Won with par on third extra hole |
| 3 | 1982 | Malaysian Open | (United States) Denny Hepler, (United States) David Ogrin | Hepler won with birdie on second extra hole |

=== Other Japan wins (6) ===
- 1968 Kanto Open
- 1969 Kyushu Tour BS Tournament
- 1972 Bridgestone Tournament
- 1974 Okinawa TV Cup
- 1976 Tochigi Open
- 1978 Hokuriku International

=== Other Taiwan wins (9) ===
- 1973 Republic of China PGA Championship
- 1974 Tamsui Open
- 1983 Republic Of China PGA Championship, Kaohsiung Open
- 1984 Phoenix Cup Open
- 1986 Vuitton Pro Tournament
- 1988 Tamsui Open
- 1992 Mercuries Taiwan Masters
- 1995 Kaohsiung Open

=== Other wins (3) ===
- 1972 World Cup (team win with Lu Liang-Huan and individual trophy)
- 1980 Philippine Masters

=== Senior wins (19) ===
- 1990 Ashitaka Senior Tournament
- 1991 Maruman Senior Tournament
- 1992 Phoenix Cup Senior Open
- 1993 Dai-ichi Life Cup, Noboru Goto Memorial Tokyu Senior Cup, Green Standard Group Cup
- 1994 Green Standard Group Cup
- 1995 HTB Senior Classic, Daxi Senior Open
- 1996 Hongxi Daxi Senior Open
- 1998 HTB Senior Classic
- 1999 Guohua Match Play
- 2000 Japan Grand Senior Tournament
- 2002 Kanto Pro Grand Senior Championship
- 2006 Kanto Pro Grand Senior Championship
- 2008 Kanto Pro Gold Senior Championship, Handa Cup
- 2009 Handa Cup
- 2010 Kanto Pro Gold Senior Championship

== Team appearances ==
this list may be incomplete

Amateur

- Eisenhower Trophy (representing Taiwan): 1962, 1964 (individual leader)

Professional

- World Cup (representing Taiwan): 1970, 1971, 1972 (team winners and individual winner), 1973, 1975, 1977, 1984
- Double Diamond International (representing the Rest of the World): 1977
- Dynasty Cup (representing Asia): 2003 (non-playing captain, winners), 2005 (non-playing captain, winners)

== See also ==
- List of golfers with most Japan Golf Tour wins
