= Japan Senior Open Golf Championship =

Japan Senior Open
Tournament information
- Location: Varies – Kanagawa in 2025
- Established: 1991
- Course(s): Varies – Sagamihara Golf Club (East Course) in 2025
- Par: 72
- Length: 6,997 yards (6,398 m)
- Organized by: Japan Golf Association
- Tour(s): PGA of Japan Senior Tour
- Format: Stroke play
- Prize fund: ¥80,000,000
- Month played: September

Current champion
- (Thailand) Thammanoon Sriroj

The Japan Senior Open Golf Championship is one of the major championships in Japanese men's senior golf. It is administered by the Japan Golf Association (JGA) and is recognised as a major championship by the PGA of Japan Senior Tour. It was founded in 1991.

== Winners ==
- 2025 (Thailand) Thammanoon Sriroj
- 2024 Choi Ho-sung
- 2023 Hiroyuki Fujita
- 2022 Prayad Marksaeng (4)
- 2021 Taichi Teshima
- 2020 Akira Teranishi
- 2019 Toru Taniguchi
- 2018 Prayad Marksaeng (3)
- 2017 Prayad Marksaeng (2)
- 2016 Prayad Marksaeng
- 2015 Takenori Hiraishi
- 2014 Masahiro Kuramoto (2)
- 2013 Kiyoshi Murota (2)
- 2012 Frankie Miñoza
- 2011 Kiyoshi Murota
- 2010 Masahiro Kuramoto
- 2009 Tsukasa Watanabe
- 2008 Tsuneyuki Nakajima (3)
- 2007 Isao Aoki (5)
- 2006 Tsuneyuki Nakajima (2)
- 2005 Tsuneyuki Nakajima
- 2004 Katsunari Takahashi (3)
- 2003 Katsunari Takahashi (2)
- 2002 Takaaki Fukuzawa
- 2001 Fujio Kobayashi
- 2000 Katsunari Takahashi
- 1999 Graham Marsh (2)
- 1998 Graham Marsh
- 1997 Isao Aoki (4)
- 1996 Isao Aoki (3)
- 1995 Isao Aoki (2)
- 1994 Isao Aoki
- 1993 Seiichi Kanai (3)
- 1992 Seiichi Kanai (2)
- 1991 Seiichi Kanai
