= List of golfers with most Japan Golf Tour wins =

This is a list of golfers who have won 10 or more events on the Japan Golf Tour since it was established in 1973. The official Japan Golf Tour website lists winners beginning with the 1985 season. Individual player pages, however, list the total number of career wins under "Lifetime Record".

Many of the players on the list have won events on other tours and unofficial events.

A player with 25th career victory earns permanent seeding on the Tour.

This list is up to date as of 15 November 2026.

| Rank | Player | Lifespan | Wins | Winning span |
|---|---|---|---|---|
| 1 | (Japan) Masashi Ozaki H | 1947–2025 | 94 | 1973–2002 |
| 2 | (Japan) Isao Aoki H | 1942– | 51 | 1973–1992 |
| 3 | (Japan) Tsuneyuki Nakajima | 1954– | 48 | 1976–2006 |
| 4 | (Japan) Naomichi Ozaki | 1956– | 32 | 1984–2005 |
| 5 | (Japan) Shingo Katayama | 1973– | 31 | 1998–2017 |
| 6 | (Japan) Masahiro Kuramoto | 1955– | 30 | 1980–2003 |
| 7 | (Japan) Teruo Sugihara | 1937–2011 | 28 | 1973–1990 |
| 8 | (Japan) Yuta Ikeda | 1985– | 22 | 2009–2026 |
| T9 | (Japan) Ryo Ishikawa | 1991– | 20 | 2007–2024 |
| T9 | (Australia) Graham Marsh | 1944– | 20 | 1973–1990 |
| T9 | (Japan) Tōru Nakamura | 1950– | 20 | 1973–1992 |
| T9 | (Japan) Toru Taniguchi | 1968– | 20 | 1998–2018 |
| 13 | (Japan) Hideto Tanihara | 1978– | 19 | 2003–2023 |
| 14 | (Japan) Hiroyuki Fujita | 1969– | 18 | 1997–2014 |
| T15 | (Japan) Toshimitsu Izawa | 1968– | 16 | 1995–2007 |
| T15 | (Japan) Norio Suzuki | 1951– | 16 | 1974–1982 |
| T17 | (Australia) Brendan Jones | 1975– | 15 | 2002–2019 |
| T17 | (Japan) Tateo Ozaki | 1954– | 15 | 1984–2000 |
| T19 | (Japan) Saburo Fujiki | 1955– | 14 | 1981–1993 |
| T19 | (United States) David Ishii | 1955– | 14 | 1985–1994 |
| T19 | (South Korea) Kim Kyung-tae | 1986– | 14 | 2010–2019 |
| 22 | (Japan) Yoshitaka Yamamoto | 1951– | 13 | 1973–1993 |
| T23 | (Japan) Katsumasa Miyamoto | 1972– | 12 | 1998–2019 |
| T23 | (United States) Brian Watts | 1966– | 12 | 1994–1998 |
| T25 | (United States) Todd Hamilton | 1965– | 11 | 1992–2003 |
| T25 | (Taiwan) Hsieh Min-Nan | 1940– | 11 | 1974–1985 |
| T25 | (Japan) Shugo Imahira | 1992– | 11 | 2017–2026 |
| T25 | (Australia) Brian Jones | 1951– | 11 | 1977–1993 |
| T25 | (Japan) Seiichi Kanai | 1940–2022 | 11 | 1976–1990 |
| T25 | (Japan) Hajime Meshiai | 1954– | 11 | 1985–1999 |
| T25 | (Japan) Takashi Murakami | 1944– | 11 | 1973–1977 |
| T32 | (Japan) Shigeki Maruyama | 1969– | 10 | 1993–2009 |
| T32 | (Japan) Katsunari Takahashi | 1950– | 10 | 1982–1991 |
| T32 | (Japan) Hidemichi Tanaka | 1971– | 10 | 1995–2001 |

H signifies members of the World Golf Hall of Fame.
