= Yoshikazu Yokoshima =

Japanese golfer

Personal information
- Nationality: Japan
- Born: 10 March 1952 (age 74) Chiba Prefecture, Japan
- Height: 1.77 m (5 ft 10 in)
- Weight: 65 kg (143 lb; 10.2 st)

Career
- Sport: Golf
- Status: Professional
- Former tour: Japan Golf Tour
- Professional wins: 6

Number of wins by tour
- Japan Golf Tour: 6

Yoshikazu Yokoshima (born 10 March 1952) is a Japanese professional golfer.

== Professional career ==
Yokoshima played on the Japan Golf Tour, winning six times.

== Professional wins (6) ==
=== PGA of Japan Tour wins (6) ===
No.	Date	Tournament	Winning score	Margin of victory	Runner(s)-up
1	6 Jun 1976	Dunlop Tournament	−14 (68-71-67-68=274)	2 strokes	(Japan) Isao Aoki
2	13 Apr 1980	Kuzuha Kokusai Tournament	−6 (64-70=134)	2 strokes	(Japan) Tsutomu Irie, (Japan) Shinsaku Maeda, (Japan) Kenichi Yamada
3	6 Sep 1987	Kanto Open	−4 (68-72-72=212) (Note: Shortened to 54 holes due to weather.)	1 stroke	(Japan) Katsuji Hasegawa, (Japan) Hajime Meshiai, (Japan) Nobuo Serizawa
4	9 Apr 1989	Pocari Sweat Open	−10 (67-68-69-70=274)	1 stroke	(Japan) Naomichi Ozaki
5	15 Oct 1989	Polaroid Cup Golf Digest Tournament	−16 (67-67-65-69=268)	6 strokes	(United States) Bill Glasson, (Japan) Masaji Kusakabe, (Japan) Kiyoshi Murota
6	3 Nov 1991	ABC Lark Cup	−8 (70-71-69-70=280)	2 strokes	(Australia) Roger Mackay
