= Kuo Chie-Hsiung =

Taiwanese golfer (born 1940)

Personal information
- Nationality: Taiwan
- Born: 25 May 1940 (age 86) Taiwan
- Height: 1.76 m (5 ft 9 in)
- Weight: 70 kg (150 lb; 11 st)

Career
- Sport: Golf
- Status: Professional
- Current tours: Japan Golf Tour; Asia Golf Circuit
- Professional wins: 30

Number of wins by tour
- Japan Golf Tour: 4
- Other: 26

Best results in major championships
- Masters Tournament: DNP
- PGA Championship: DNP
- U.S. Open: DNP
- The Open Championship: T40: 1972

Achievements and awards
- Asia Golf Circuit Order of Merit winner: 1974

Kuo Chie-Hsiung (Chinese: 郭吉雄, born 25 May 1940) is a Taiwanese professional golfer.

== Career ==
Kuo played on the Japan Golf Tour, winning four times including three tournaments in a five week span during 1979, and the Asia Golf Circuit, winning nine tournaments. He was the 1974 Asia Golf Circuit champion after wins in the Indian and Taiwan opens, and narrowly missed out of defending the championship the following year when topped the money list but finished half a point behind Hsieh Min-Nan despite winning three tournaments during the season. He also led the money list in 1978, but was again runner-up in the points race.

Kuo also had a great deal of success in his homeland and won many other tournaments throughout Asia.

== Professional wins (30) ==
=== PGA of Japan Tour wins (4) ===
No.	Date	Tournament	Winning score	Margin of victory	Runner(s)-up
1	23 Apr 1978	Dunlop International Open^{1}	−23 (69-66-64-66=265)	11 strokes	(United States) Bob Byman
2	7 Oct 1979	Gene Sarazen Jun Classic	−4 (68-73-69-38=248)*	Playoff	(Japan) Yasuhiro Funatogawa
3	21 Oct 1979	Golf Digest Tournament	−10 (69-68-69=206)*	3 strokes	(Japan) Fujio Kobayashi
4	4 Nov 1979	Japan Open Golf Championship	−3 (71-70-70-74=285)	Playoff	(Japan) Isao Aoki, (Japan) Koichi Uehara, (Japan) Yoshitaka Yamamoto

*Note: Tournament shortened to 54/63 holes due to weather.
^{1}Co-sanctioned by the Asia Golf Circuit

PGA of Japan Tour playoff record (2–0)

No.	Year	Tournament	Opponent(s)	Result
1	1979	Gene Sarazen Jun Classic	(Japan) Yasuhiro Funatogawa	Won with birdie on fifth extra hole
2	1979	Japan Open Golf Championship	(Japan) Isao Aoki, (Japan) Koichi Uehara, (Japan) Yoshitaka Yamamoto	Won with birdie on fourth extra hole Aoki and Uehara eliminated by birdie on first hole

=== Asia Golf Circuit wins (9) ===
No.	Date	Tournament	Winning score	Margin of victory	Runner(s)-up
1	31 Mar 1974	Indian Open	−5 (71-72-74-70=287)	2 strokes	(Myanmar) Mya Aye, (Australia) Brian Jones, (United States) Don Klenk
2	7 Apr 1974	Taiwan Open	−6 (69-70-72-71=282)	2 strokes	(Taiwan) Lu Liang-Huan
2	16 Feb 1975	Philippine Open	−12 (73-67-70-66=276)	8 strokes	(Philippines) Ben Arda
4	6 Apr 1975	Taiwan Open (2)	−11 (68-69-69-71=277)	Playoff	(Philippines) Ben Arda, (Taiwan) Hsieh Min-Nan
5	13 Apr 1975	Korea Open	−4 (74-70-69-71=284)	Playoff	(United States) Art Russell
6	2 Apr 1978	Indonesia Open	−9 (71-67-68-69=275)	3 strokes	(Taiwan) Hsu Sheng-san, (Philippines) Eleuterio Nival
7	23 Apr 1978	Dunlop International Open^{1}	−23 (69-66-64-66=265)	11 strokes	(United States) Bob Byman
8	2 Mar 1980	Cathay Pacific Hong Kong Open	−5 (72-67-68-67=274)	2 strokes	(Taiwan) Lu Liang-Huan
9	13 Apr 1980	Taiwan Open (3)	−11 (69-71-66-71=277)	4 strokes	(United States) Mike Krantz, (Taiwan) Lu Liang-Huan

^{1}Co-sanctioned by the PGA of Japan Tour

Asia Golf Circuit playoff record (2–3)

No.	Year	Tournament	Opponent(s)	Result
1	1972	Taiwan Open	(Japan) Haruo Yasuda	Lost to birdie on fifth extra hole
2	1975	Indian Open	(Australia) Ted Ball	Lost to birdie on first extra hole
3	1975	Taiwan Open	(Philippines) Ben Arda, (Taiwan) Hsieh Min-Nan	Won with birdie on fourth extra hole
4	1975	Korea Open	(United States) Art Russell	Won after concession on second extra hole
5	1978	Taiwan Open	(Taiwan) Hsieh Yung-yo	Lost to par on seventh extra hole

=== Other wins (12) ===
- 1967 ROC PGA Championship
- 1972 ROC PGA Championship
- 1974 ROC PGA Championship
- 1977 Kaohsiung Open, Dunhill International Match-Play (Philippines)
- 1978 Kaohsiung Open
- 1986 Chiang Kei-Shek Memorial Tournament
- 1987 Tamsui Open
- 1988 Mercuries Taiwan Masters
- 1989 BMW Open, Beihai Open
- 1991 Kaohsiung Open

=== Senior wins (6) ===
- 1992 Japan BMW Seniors Open
- 1993 Japan Nagoya TV Cup Seniors
- 1995 Japan Nagoya TV Cup Seniors, Kuo-Hua Match Play, PGA Seniors and Women Championship
- 1999 PGA Seniors and Women Championship

== Team appearances ==
Amateur

- Eisenhower Trophy (representing Taiwan): 1962, 1964

Professional

- World Cup (representing Taiwan): 1974, 1975, 1976, 1977
- Dunhill Cup (representing Taiwan): 1990
