= 1972 Asia Golf Circuit =

Golf tour season

1972 Asia Golf Circuit season
- Duration: 24 February 1972 – 23 April 1972
- Number of official events: 9
- Most wins: (Taiwan) Hsieh Min-Nan (2)
- Order of Merit: (Australia) Graham Marsh

The 1972 Asia Golf Circuit was the 11th season of the Asia Golf Circuit (formerly the Far East Circuit), the main professional golf tour in Asia since it was established in 1961.

== Schedule ==
The following table lists official events during the 1972 season.

Date	Tournament	Host country	Purse (US$)	Winner (Note: The number in brackets after each winner's name is the number of Asia Golf Circuit events they had won up to and including that tournament. This information is only shown for Asia Golf Circuit members.)	Notes
27 Feb	Philippine Open	Philippines	15,000	(Japan) Hideyo Sugimoto (2)	
5 Mar	Singapore Open	Singapore	15,000	(Japan) Takaaki Kono (3)	
12 Mar	Malaysian Open	Malaysia	15,000	(Japan) Takashi Murakami (1)	
19 Mar	Indian Open	India	15,000	(Australia) Brian Jones (1)	
26 Mar	Thailand Open	Thailand	15,000	(Taiwan) Hsieh Min-Nan (1)	
2 Apr	Hong Kong Open	Hong Kong	20,000	(New Zealand) Walter Godfrey (1)	
9 Apr	Taiwan Open	Taiwan	15,000	(Japan) Haruo Yasuda (4)	
16 Apr	Korea Open	South Korea	15,000	(South Korea) Han Chang-sang (3)	
23 Apr	Sobu International Open	Japan	30,000	(Taiwan) Hsieh Min-Nan (2)	New tournament

== Order of Merit ==
The Order of Merit was titled as the San Miguel Circuit Prize and was based on tournament results during the season, calculated using a points-based system.

Position	Player	Points
1	(Australia) Graham Marsh	129
2	(Taiwan) Hsieh Min-Nan	122
3	(New Zealand) Walter Godfrey	116
4	(Philippines) Ben Arda	100
5	(South Korea) Han Chang-sang	89
