= Seiichi Kanai =

Japanese professional golfer

Seiichi Kanai 金井清一
Personal information
- Nationality: Japan
- Born: 24 July 1940 Niigata Prefecture, Japan
- Died: 30 November 2022 (aged 82) Kawasaki, Kanagawa, Japan
- Height: 1.70 m (5 ft 7 in)
- Weight: 70 kg (150 lb; 11 st)
- Spouse: Sachiko

Career
- Sport: Golf
- Turned professional: 1965
- Former tour: Japan Golf Tour
- Professional wins: 20

Number of wins by tour
- Japan Golf Tour: 11
- Other: 9

Best results in major championships
- Masters Tournament: DNP
- PGA Championship: DNP
- U.S. Open: DNP
- The Open Championship: CUT: 1986

Seiichi Kanai (金井 清一, Kanai Seiichi; 24 July 1940 − 30 November 2022) was a Japanese professional golfer.

== Career ==
Kanai was born in Niigata. He won 11 tournaments on the Japan Golf Tour.

== Professional wins (20) ==
=== PGA of Japan Tour wins (11) ===
No.	Date	Tournament	Winning score	Margin of victory	Runner(s)-up
1	26 Sep 1976	Japan PGA Championship	−7 (64-70-69-70=273)	Playoff	(Japan) Shichiro Enomoto, (Taiwan) Hsieh Min-Nan, (Japan) Haruo Yasuda
2	16 Jul 1978	Kanto Open	−3 (70-72-74-69=285)	Playoff	(Japan) Minoru Hiyoshi, (Taiwan) Hsieh Min-Nan
3	23 Aug 1981	Kanto Pro Championship	−8 (71-68-69=208)*	Playoff	(Japan) Yutaka Hagawa
4	27 Sep 1981	Hiroshima Open	−14 (66-69-67=202)*	Playoff	(Taiwan) Lu Hsi-chuen
5	29 May 1983	Pepsi Ube Open	−14 (68-70-68-68=274)	2 strokes	(Japan) Kouichi Inoue
6	16 Oct 1983	Golf Digest Tournament	−12 (69-70-69-68=276)	2 strokes	(Japan) Kouichi Inoue
7	24 Mar 1985	Shizuoka Open	−4 (71-70-71-72=284)	1 stroke	(Japan) Isao Aoki, (Japan) Tomishege Ikeda, (Japan) Tōru Nakamura
8	8 Sep 1985	Kanto Open	−11 (70-69-70-68=277)	5 strokes	(Japan) Toshiharu Kawada
9	15 Dec 1985	Daikyo Open	−14 (67-66-70-71=274)	5 strokes	(Japan) Masahiro Kuramoto, (Japan) Hisashi Suzumura, (Japan) Tsukasa Watanabe
10	7 Jun 1987	Tohoku Classic	−13 (71-69-70-65=275)	2 strokes	(Japan) Hajime Meshiai
11	29 Jul 1990	NST Niigata Open	−10 (70-72-67-69=278)	1 stroke	(Japan) Yukio Noguchi

*Note: Tournament shortened to 54 holes due to weather.

PGA of Japan Tour playoff record (4–2)

No.	Year	Tournament	Opponent(s)	Result
1	1976	Japan PGA Championship	(Japan) Shichiro Enomoto, (Taiwan) Hsieh Min-Nan, (Japan) Haruo Yasuda	Won with par on third extra hole Hsieh and Yasuda eliminated by par on first hole
2	1978	Kanto Open	(Japan) Minoru Hiyoshi, (Taiwan) Hsieh Min-Nan	
3	1981	Kanto Pro Championship	(Japan) Yutaka Hagawa	Won with par on first extra hole
4	1981	Hiroshima Open	(Taiwan) Lu Hsi-chuen	Won with birdie on first extra hole
5	1985	Japan PGA Championship	(Japan) Tateo Ozaki	Lost to birdie on first extra hole
6	1988	Mizuno Open	(Japan) Yoshimi Niizeki	Lost to birdie on first extra hole

=== Asia Golf Circuit wins (1) ===
No.	Date	Tournament	Winning score	Margin of victory	Runner-up
1	2 Mar 1986	Cathay Pacific Hong Kong Open	+1 (72-73-70-70=285)	1 stroke	(Australia) Ian Baker-Finch

=== Other wins (3) ===
this list is probably incomplete

- 1972 Japan PGA Championship
- 1975 Nagano Open
- 1980 Yamanashi Pro-Am

=== Japan Senior PGA Tour wins (5) ===
- 1990 Japan PGA Senior Championship
- 1991 Japan Senior Open
- 1992 Japan Senior Open
- 1993 Japan Senior Open
- 1998 Japan PGA Senior Championship

== Team appearances ==
- World Cup (representing Japan): 1977

== See also ==
- List of golfers with most Japan Golf Tour wins
