= Akira Yabe =

Japanese golfer

Personal information
- Nationality: Japan
- Born: 1 June 1946 (age 80) Tochigi Prefecture, Japan
- Height: 1.72 m (5 ft 8 in)
- Weight: 64 kg (141 lb; 10.1 st)

Career
- Sport: Golf
- Status: Professional
- Former tour: Japan Golf Tour
- Professional wins: 11

Number of wins by tour
- Japan Golf Tour: 5
- Other: 6

Akira Yabe (born 1 June 1946) is a Japanese professional golfer, most active in the 1970s and 1980s.

== Professional career ==
Yabe played on the Japan Golf Tour, winning five times. His biggest win came at the 1982 Japan Open Golf Championship.

== Professional wins (11) ==
=== PGA of Japan Tour wins (5) ===
No.	Date	Tournament	Winning score	Margin of victory	Runner(s)-up
1	16 Apr 1978	Kuzuha Kokusai Tournament	−5 (65-70=135)	1 stroke	(Australia) Brian Jones, (Japan) Yoshikazu Yokoshima
2	1 Apr 1979	Shizuoka Open	+1 (71-75-71=217) (Note: Shortened to 54 holes due to weather.)	2 strokes	(Japan) Kikuo Arai, (Japan) Shigeru Nonaka
3	29 Jun 1980	Kanto Pro Championship	−14 (68-68-66-72=274)	4 strokes	(Japan) Toshiharu Kawada
4	20 Jul 1980	Descente Cup Hokkoku Open	−10 (71-69-69-69=278)	4 strokes	(Taiwan) Hsieh Yung-yo
5	31 Oct 1982	Japan Open Golf Championship	−7 (71-70-67-69=277)	5 strokes	(Japan) Yutaka Hagawa, (Japan) Naomichi Ozaki

PGA of Japan Tour playoff record (0–3)

No.	Year	Tournament	Opponent(s)	Result
1	1977	KBC Augusta	(Australia) Brian Jones	Lost to par on second extra hole
2	1981	Shizuoka Open	(Japan) Isao Aoki	Lost to par on third extra hole
3	1984	Bridgestone Aso Open	(Japan) Katsuji Hasegawa, (Japan) Hideto Shigenobu	

=== Other wins (2) ===
- 1978 Nagano Open
- 1980 Kanagawa Open

=== Senior wins (4) ===
- 2007 Handa Cup Kanto Pro Grand Senior Championship
- 2008 Kanto Pro Grand Senior Championship
- 2014 Starts Senior Tournament, Japan Professional Gold Senior Championship Golf Partner Cup
