= Isao Aoki =

Japanese professional golfer (born 1942)

Isao Aoki 青木 功
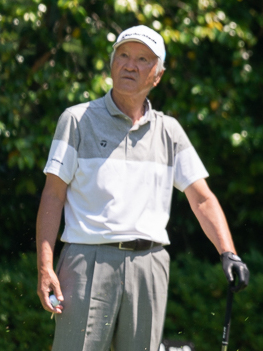

Personal information
- Nationality: Japan
- Born: 31 August 1942 (age 84) Abiko, Chiba, Japan
- Height: 6 ft 0 in (1.83 m)
- Weight: 180 lb (82 kg)

Career
- Sport: Golf
- Turned professional: 1964
- Former tours: PGA Tour; Japan Golf Tour; Champions Tour
- Professional wins: 80
- Highest ranking: 8 (7 June 1987)

Number of wins by tour
- PGA Tour: 1
- European Tour: 1
- Japan Golf Tour: 51 (2nd all-time)
- PGA Tour of Australasia: 1
- PGA Tour Champions: 9
- Other: 17

Best results in major championships
- Masters Tournament: T16: 1985
- PGA Championship: T4: 1981
- U.S. Open: 2nd: 1980
- The Open Championship: T7: 1978, 1979, 1988

Achievements and awards
- World Golf Hall of Fame: 2004 (member page)
- PGA of Japan Tour money list winner: 1976, 1978, 1979, 1980, 1981

Isao Aoki (青木 功, Aoki Isao; born 31 August 1942) is a Japanese professional golfer. He was elected to the World Golf Hall of Fame in 2004.

== Early life ==
Aoki was born in Abiko, Chiba, Japan. He was introduced to golf while caddying at the Abiko Golf Club as a schoolboy.

== Professional career ==
In 1964, Aoki turned professional. He went on to win more than fifty events on the Japan Golf Tour between 1972 and 1990, trailing only Masashi "Jumbo" Ozaki on the list of golfers with most Japan Golf Tour wins. He won the Japan Golf Tour money list five times in six years: 1976, 1978, 1979, 1980, and 1981. His career earnings are 980 million yen.

In 1983, Aoki won the Hawaiian Open on the U.S.-based PGA Tour, the first Japanese and Asian player to win on the tour, and the Panasonic European Open on the European Tour. He also won the prestigious World Match Play Championship in England in 1978, which was not a European Tour event at that time, and picked up a win on the PGA Tour of Australasia. Aoki is also one of the nine players in the history of the Open Championship to shoot a round of just 63 shots (which he achieved in the third round of the 1980 event). Despite this being the joint-best round in the history of the tournament at the time, Aoki would only finish tied for 12th that year.

Aoki played 165 times on the PGA Tour between 1974 and 1999, primarily from 1981 to 1990. His best finish in a major championship was a second-place finish to Jack Nicklaus (by two strokes) in the 1980 U.S. Open. That finish, combined with his recent record in Japan and around the globe, meant that Aoki would finish 1980 ranked third in the unofficial McCormack's World Golf Rankings, a position he would hold at the end of 1981. After the Official World Golf Rankings debuted in 1986, he was ranked in the top-10 for several weeks in 1987.

In December 1984 after receiving an invitation from Gary Player, Aoki traveled to South Africa to participate in the Million Dollar Challenge. Aoki did this in spite of the efforts of the Japanese government to dissuade him from making the trip.

As a senior, Aoki has played primarily in the United States on the Champions Tour, winning nine times between 1992 and 2003. He has eight senior victories outside the United States, including five victories in the Japan Senior Open where he shot his age, 65, during his most recent triumph in 2007.

== Professional wins (80) ==
=== PGA Tour wins (1) ===
No.	Date	Tournament	Winning score	Margin of victory	Runner-up
1	13 Feb 1983	Hawaiian Open	−20 (66-70-65-67=268)	1 stroke	(United States) Jack Renner

=== European Tour wins (1) ===
No.	Date	Tournament	Winning score	Margin of victory	Runners-up
1	4 Sep 1983	Panasonic European Open	−6 (65-70-70-69=274)	2 strokes	(Spain) Seve Ballesteros, (England) Nick Faldo, (England) Carl Mason

=== PGA of Japan Tour wins (51) ===
No.	Date	Tournament	Winning score	Margin of victory	Runner(s)-up
1	29 Apr 1973	Chunichi Crowns	−10 (66-67-68-69=270)	1 stroke	(Taiwan) Lu Liang-Huan
2	20 May 1973	Pepsi-Wilson Tournament	−7 (67-65-72-77=281)	Playoff	(Japan) Kosaku Shimada
3	17 Jun 1973	Sapporo Tokyu Open	−7 (69-71-67-74=281)	1 stroke	(Taiwan) Lu Liang-Huan
4	26 Aug 1973	KBC Augusta	−22 (64-67-68-67=266)	13 strokes	(Japan) Yasuhiro Miyamoto
5	21 Oct 1973	Japan PGA Championship	−13 (64-70-68-73=275)	8 strokes	(Japan) Haruo Yasuda
6	17 Feb 1974	JPGA East-West Match	−5 (139)		
7	14 Jul 1974	Kanto Open	−17 (65-65-71-70=271)	12 strokes	(Japan) Takaaki Kona
8	4 Aug 1974	Kanto Pro Championship	−21 (67-66-68-66=267)	6 strokes	(Japan) Hideyo Sugimoto
9	15 Sep 1974	Sanpo Classic	−12 (69-65-68-74=276)	3 strokes	(Taiwan) Kuo Chie-Hsiung, (Japan) Masashi Ozaki
10	29 Apr 1975	Chunichi Crowns (2)	−6 (68-68-68-68=272)	1 stroke	(Japan) Teruo Sugihara
11	13 Jul 1975	Kanto Open (2)	−8 (72-72-69-67=280)	1 stroke	(Japan) Fujio Kobayashi
12	17 Oct 1976	Tokai Classic	−5 (74-74-68-67=283)	Playoff	(Japan) Teruo Sugihara, (Japan) Shigeru Uchida
13	12 Jun 1977	Tohoku Classic	−10 (71-67-72-68=278)	1 stroke	(Taiwan) Lu Liang-Huan
14	13 Nov 1977	ABC Japan vs USA Golf Matches	−8 (67-69-71-73=280)	2 strokes	(United States) Tom Weiskopf
15	30 Apr 1978	Chunichi Crowns (3)	−10 (63-67-69-70=270)	5 strokes	(Japan) Masashi Ozaki
16	28 May 1978	Japan PGA Match-Play Championship	2 and 1		(Japan) Takahiro Takeyasu
17	18 Jun 1978	Sapporo Tokyu Open (2)	−10 (70-69-67-72=278)	5 strokes	(Taiwan) Hsieh Yung-yo
18	6 Aug 1978	Kanto Pro Championship (2)	−14 (69-69-68-68=274)	1 stroke	(Japan) Tsuneyuki Nakajima
19	12 Nov 1978	ABC Japan vs USA Golf Matches (2)	−15 (71-68-64-70=273)	5 strokes	(Japan) Kosaku Shimada
20	3 Dec 1978	Golf Nippon Series	−8 (69-69-73-71=282)	1 stroke	(Japan) Haruo Yasuda
21	29 Apr 1979	Chunichi Crowns (4)	−1 (67-73-69-70=279)	1 stroke	(Japan) Tōru Nakamura, (Japan) Haruo Yasuda
22	20 May 1979	Japan PGA Match-Play Championship (2)	1 up		(Taiwan) Hsieh Min-Nan
23	1 Jul 1979	Kanto Pro Championship (3)	−9 (68-66-72-73=279)	5 strokes	
24	2 Dec 1979	Golf Nippon Series (3)	−14 (68-71-66-71=276)	13 strokes	(Japan) Kikuo Arai, (Japan) Tōru Nakamura
25	4 May 1980	Chunichi Crowns (5)	E (69-68-71-72=280)	2 strokes	(Australia) Graham Marsh
26	25 May 1980	Yomiuri Open	−9 (70-72-71-70=283)	1 stroke	(Japan) Teruo Sugihara
27	31 Aug 1980	KBC Augusta (2)	−7 (68-69=137) (Note: Shortened to 36/63 holes due to weather.)	2 strokes	(Japan) Hiroshi Tahara
28	28 Sep 1980	Kanto Open (3)	+2 (71-71-75-73=290)	1 stroke	(Japan) Pete Izumikawa, (Japan) Akira Yabe
29	30 Nov 1980	Gene Sarazen Jun Classic	−11 (68-67-70-72=277)	1 stroke	(Spain) Seve Ballesteros
30	22 Mar 1981	Shizuoka Open	−9 (74-69-64-72=279)	Playoff	(Japan) Akira Yabe
31	17 May 1981	Japan PGA Match-Play Championship (3)	38 holes		(Japan) Katsuji Hasegawa
32	2 Aug 1981	Japan PGA Championship (2)	−11 (72-67-70-68=277)	4 strokes	(Japan) Tōru Nakamura
33	16 May 1982	Japan PGA Match-Play Championship (4)	4 and 2		(Japan) Yutaka Hagawa
34	12 Jun 1983	Sapporo Tokyu Open (3)	−14 (72-65-71-66=274)	7 strokes	(Australia) Terry Gale
35	3 Jul 1983	Kanto Pro Championship (4)	−10 (69-68-70-35=242)	1 stroke	(Japan) Naomichi Ozaki
36	2 Oct 1983	Japan Open Golf Championship	−7 (72-69-71-69=281)	Playoff	(Australia) Terry Gale
37	4 Dec 1983	Golf Nippon Series (3)	−7 (70-71-66-74=281)	1 stroke	(Japan) Masahiro Kuramoto
38	15 Jun 1986	Sapporo Tokyu Open (4)	−15 (65-67-72-69=273)	3 strokes	(Japan) Shinsaku Maeda
39	27 Jul 1986	Japan PGA Championship (3)	−16 (66-68-69-69=272)	4 strokes	(Japan) Masashi Ozaki
40	31 Aug 1986	KBC Augusta (3)	−6 (74-72-69-67=282)	1 stroke	(Japan) Masahiro Kuramoto, (Japan) Masashi Ozaki
41	7 Sep 1986	Kanto Open (4)	−13 (72-69-70-68=279)	1 stroke	(Japan) Masashi Ozaki
42	26 Apr 1987	Dunlop International Open^{1}	−11 (69-67-69-72=277)	1 stroke	(Japan) Tsuneyuki Nakajima, (Japan) Yoshitaka Yamamoto
43	20 Sep 1987	ANA Open	−6 (72-70-68-72=282)	1 stroke	(Japan) Tsukasa Watanabe
44	11 Oct 1987	Japan Open Golf Championship (2)	−9 (70-68-71-70=279)	1 stroke	(Japan) Tsuneyuki Nakajima, (Japan) Nobuo Serizawa
45	6 Dec 1987	Golf Nippon Series (4)	−7 (67-71=138)	Shared title with (United States) David Ishii	
46	1 Oct 1989	Tokai Classic (2)	−13 (67-69-71-68=275)	5 strokes	(Japan) Pete Izumikawa
47	26 Nov 1989	Casio World Open	−14 (70-70-65-69=274)	1 stroke	(United States) Larry Mize
48	27 May 1990	Mitsubishi Galant Tournament	+1 (70-76-71-72=289)	3 strokes	(Japan) Masashi Ozaki, (Japan) Teruo Sugihara, (Japan) Tsuyoshi Yoneyama
49	27 Oct 1991	Bridgestone Open	−10 (71-63=134)	1 stroke	(Japan) Tsuyoshi Yoneyama
50	31 May 1992	Mitsubishi Galant Tournament (2)	−11 (69-66-71-71=277)	4 strokes	(Taiwan) Chen Tze-chung, (Japan) Saburo Fujiki
51	29 Nov 1992	Casio World Open (2)	−11 (76-66-64-71=277)	4 strokes	(Taiwan) Chen Tze-ming

^{1}Co-sanctioned by the Asia Golf Circuit

PGA of Japan Tour playoff record (4–9)

No.	Year	Tournament	Opponent(s)	Result
1	1973	Pepsi-Wilson Tournament	(Japan) Kosaku Shimada	Won with birdie on sixth extra hole
2	1973	World Friendship	(Taiwan) Lu Liang-Huan, (Australia) Graham Marsh	Lu won with birdie on first extra hole
3	1974	ANA Sapporo Open	(Japan) Masashi Ozaki	Lost to birdie on first extra hole
4	1976	Tokai Classic	(Japan) Teruo Sugihara, (Japan) Shigeru Uchida	Won with birdie on first extra hole
5	1979	Japan Open Golf Championship	(Taiwan) Kuo Chie-Hsiung, (Japan) Koichi Uehara, (Japan) Yoshitaka Yamamoto	Kuo won with birdie on fourth extra hole Aoki and Uehara eliminated by birdie on first hole
6	1981	Shizuoka Open	(Japan) Akira Yabe	Won with par on third extra hole
7	1981	Golf Nippon Series	(Japan) Yutaka Hagawa	Lost to birdie on first extra hole
8	1983	Niigata Open	(Japan) Hideto Shigenobu, (Japan) Katsunari Takahashi	Shigenobu won with par on first extra hole
9	1983	Japan Open Golf Championship	(Australia) Terry Gale	Won with par on second extra hole
10	1984	Chunichi Crowns	(United States) Scott Simpson	Lost to par on first extra hole
11	1986	Suntory Open	(Australia) Graham Marsh	Lost to par on first extra hole
12	1991	Fujisankei Classic	(Japan) Saburo Fujiki, (Australia) Brian Jones, (Japan) Hideki Kase	Fujiki won with birdie on second extra hole
13	1991	Dunlop Phoenix Tournament	(Spain) Seve Ballesteros, (United States) Jay Don Blake, (United States) Larry Nelson	Nelson won with par on fourth extra hole Ballesteros eliminated by birdie on third hole Blake eliminated by par on first hole

=== PGA Tour of Australia wins (1) ===
No.	Date	Tournament	Winning score	Margin of victory	Runners-up
1	22 Jan 1989	Coca-Cola Classic	−9 (69-73-66-71=279)	1 stroke	(Australia) Rodger Davis, (Australia) Peter Fowler, (Japan) Tsuneyuki Nakajima, (Australia) Peter O'Malley

=== Other wins (8) ===
- 1971 Kanto Pro Championship (Japan)
- 1972 Kanto Pro Championship (Japan)
- 1973 Gold Beck
- 1977 Jun Classic
- 1978 Colgate World Match Play Championship (England)
- 1982 Old Sones Invitational, Daikyo Open
- 1987 Fred Meyer Challenge (with Payne Stewart)

=== Senior PGA Tour wins (9) ===
No.	Date	Tournament	Winning score	Margin of victory	Runner(s)-up
1	27 Sep 1992	Nationwide Championship	−8 (70-66=136)	1 stroke	(United States) Raymond Floyd
2	18 Sep 1994	Bank One Senior Classic	−14 (69-64-69=202)	3 strokes	(United States) Chi-Chi Rodríguez
3	25 Sep 1994	Brickyard Crossing Championship	−11 (66-67=133)	1 stroke	(United States) Jimmy Powell, (United States) Tom Wargo
4	27 Aug 1995	Bank of Boston Senior Classic	−12 (69-66-69=204)	1 stroke	(New Zealand) Bob Charles, (United States) Hale Irwin
5	26 May 1996	BellSouth Senior Classic	−14 (64-68-70=202)	1 stroke	(Australia) Graham Marsh, (United States) Jay Sigel
6	30 Jun 1996	Kroger Senior Classic	−15 (63-69-66=198)	1 stroke	(United States) Mike Hill, (United States) Rocky Thompson
7	28 Sep 1997	Emerald Coast Classic	−14 (71-60-65=196)	Playoff	(United States) Gil Morgan
8	14 Jun 1998	BellSouth Senior Classic (2)	−18 (62-66-70=198)	2 strokes	(United States) Larry Nelson
9	19 May 2002	Instinet Classic	−15 (69-67-65=201)	4 strokes	(United States) John Jacobs

Senior PGA Tour playoff record (1–4)

No.	Year	Tournament	Opponent	Result
1	1994	The Transamerica	(United States) Kermit Zarley	Lost to birdie on first extra hole
2	1995	The Tradition	(United States) Jack Nicklaus	Lost to birdie on third extra hole
3	1997	Emerald Coast Classic	(United States) Gil Morgan	Won with par on second extra hole
4	1998	Coldwell Banker Burnet Classic	(United States) Leonard Thompson	Lost to birdie on second extra hole
5	2000	State Farm Senior Classic	(United States) Leonard Thompson	Lost to birdie on second extra hole

=== Japan Senior PGA Tour wins (9) ===
- 1994 Japan Senior Open
- 1995 American Express Grand Slam, Japan Senior Open
- 1996 Japan Senior Open
- 1997 Japan Senior Open
- 2000 N. Cup Senior Open
- 2002 N. Cup Senior Open
- 2007 Japan Senior Open
- 2008 Kinojo Senior Open

== Results in major championships ==
Tournament	1974	1975	1976	1977	1978	1979	1980	1981	1982	1983	1984	1985	1986	1987	1988	1989	1990
Masters Tournament	CUT	CUT		T28	CUT	T34	CUT	T45	CUT	19	T25	T16	CUT	CUT	T25		
U.S. Open						T36	2	T11	T30		T16			T14	T50	T33	T33
The Open Championship				CUT	T7	T7	T12	T11	T20		T47				T7		CUT
PGA Championship						CUT		T4	T49	CUT	CUT		T36	CUT	T38	T17	T40

Top 10
Did not play

CUT = missed the half-way cut (3rd round cut in 1977 Open Championship)
"T" = tied

=== Summary ===
Tournament	Wins	2nd	3rd	Top-5	Top-10	Top-25	Events	Cuts made
Masters Tournament	0	0	0	0	0	4	14	7
U.S. Open	0	1	0	1	1	4	9	9
The Open Championship	0	0	0	0	3	6	9	7
PGA Championship	0	0	0	1	1	2	10	6
Totals	0	1	0	2	5	16	42	29

- Most consecutive cuts made – 7 (1988 Masters – 1990 U.S. Open)
- Longest streak of top-10s – 1 (five times)

== Results in The Players Championship ==
Tournament	1982	1983	1984	1985	1986	1987	1988	1989	1990
The Players Championship	CUT	T43	T15	T7	CUT	T24	T60	CUT	CUT

Top 10

CUT = missed the halfway cut
"T" indicates a tie for a place

== Results in senior major championships ==
Results not in chronological order before 2012.

Tournament	1993	1994	1995	1996	1997	1998	1999	2000	2001	2002
Senior PGA Championship	3	T5	T5	2	T20	T44	T15	T62	T20	CUT
The Tradition	6	T9	2	T12	2	T13	T28		T47	T35
Senior Players Championship	T5	T3	6	T30	T2	3	T14	T18	T17	21
U.S. Senior Open	T20	10	T3	11	T49	T4	CUT	T47	T2	T18

Tournament	2003	2004	2005	2006	2007	2008	2009	2010	2011	2012
Senior PGA Championship	CUT	T27	T62	T28	CUT	CUT	CUT			
The Tradition	T20	T53	T32	T67	T71		T57	64		
Senior Players Championship	T12	T28	T18	52						
U.S. Senior Open	T30			T45	CUT					
Senior British Open Championship	T14	T22	T36	T60	CUT	50	CUT	DQ	CUT	CUT

Top 10
Did not play

CUT = missed the halfway cut
DQ = disqualified
"T" indicates a tie for a place
Note: The Senior British Open Championship did not become a major until 2003.

== Team appearances ==
- World Cup (representing Japan): 1973, 1974
- Alfred Dunhill Cup (representing Japan): 1985, 1999, 2000
- Nissan Cup/Kirin Cup (representing Japan): 1985, 1987, 1988
- UBS Warburg Cup (representing the Rest of the World): 2001, 2002
- Dynasty Cup (representing Japan): 2003 (non-playing captain), 2005 (non-playing captain)

== Honours ==
- Member of the World Golf Hall of Fame (2004)
- Medal with Purple Ribbon (2008)
- Order of the Rising Sun, 4th Class, Gold Rays with Rosette (2015)
- Person of Cultural Merit (2024)

== See also ==
- List of golfers with most Japan Golf Tour wins
