= Kanto Pro Championship =

The Kanto Pro Championship was a professional golf tournament in Japan . It was first played in 1931 and was an event on the Japan Golf Tour from 1973 to 1990. It was played in July at a variety of courses in Eastern Japan, mainly in the Kantō region.

== Winners ==
this list is incomplete

- 1990 Tsuneyuki Nakajima
- 1989 Saburo Fujiki
- 1988 Tomohiro Maruyama
- 1987 Naomichi Ozaki
- 1986 Tsuneyuki Nakajima
- 1985 Tsuneyuki Nakajima
- 1984 Pete Izumikawa
- 1983 Isao Aoki
- 1982 Motomasa Aoki
- 1981 Seiichi Kanai
- 1980 Akira Yabe
- 1979 Isao Aoki
- 1978 Isao Aoki
- 1977 Kenji Mori
- 1976 Takashi Murakami
- 1975 Hsieh Min-Nan
- 1974 Isao Aoki
- 1973 Masashi Ozaki
- 1972 Isao Aoki
- 1971 Isao Aoki
- 1970 Fujio Ishii
- 1969 Haruo Yasuda
- 1968 Torakichi Nakamura
- 1967 Seiichi Sato
- 1966 Hideyo Sugimoto
- 1965 Fujio Ishii
- 1964 Chen Ching-Po
- 1963 Koichi Ono
- 1962 Koichi Ono
- 1961 Torakichi Nakamura
- 1960 Torakichi Nakamura
- 1959 Koichi Ono
- 1958 Koichi Ono
- 1957 Haruyoshi Kobari
- 1956 Chen Sei Sui
- 1955 Haruyoshi Kobari
- 1954 Kashio Kurihara
- 1953 Yoshiro Hayashi
- 1952 Tsurumi Mita
- 1951 Seiji Inoue
- 1950 Ryouhei Tanaami
- 1949 Son Shi Kin
- 1948 Yoshiro Hayashi
- 1944–47 No championship due to World War II
- 1943 Koike Kuniyoshi
- 1942 Seiji Inuoue
- 1941 Takehito Fujii
- 1940 Lin Man Puku
- 1939 Lin Man Puku
- 1938 seisaku Kawai
- 1937 Lin Man Puku
- 1936 Rokuzo Asami
- 1935 Chin Sei Sui
- 1934 Chin Sei Sui
- 1933 Kanekichi Nakamura
- 1932 Kanekichi Nakamura
- 1931 Rokuzo Asami
