= Kanto Open =

The Kanto Open was a professional golf tournament in Japan. It was founded in 1950 and was last played in 1999. It was an event on the Japan Golf Tour from 1973 to 1991. It was played in September at a variety of courses in the Kantō region.

== Winners ==
this list may be incomplete

- 1999 Hisayuki Sasaki
- 1998 Chang-Ting Yeh
- 1997 Akihito Yokoyama
- 1996 Keiichiro Fukabori
- 1995 Yutaka Hagawa
- 1994 Hisayuki Sasaki
- 1993 Takaaki Fukuzawa
- 1992 Tatsuya Shiraishi
- 1991 Yoshinori Kaneko
- 1990 Ryoken Kawagishi
- 1989 Yoshi Mizumaki
- 1988 Akihito Yokoyama
- 1987 Yoshikazu Yokoshima
- 1986 Isao Aoki
- 1985 Seiichi Kanai
- 1984 Tsuneyuki Nakajima
- 1983 Saburo Fujiki
- 1982 Masashi Ozaki
- 1981 Nobumitsu Yuhara
- 1980 Isao Aoki
- 1979 Masaru Amono
- 1978 Seiichi Kanai
- 1977 Masashi Ozaki
- 1976 Masashi Ozaki
- 1975 Isao Aoki
- 1974 Isao Aoki
- 1973 Takashi Kurihara
- 1972 Masashi Ozaki
- 1971 Hsieh Yung-yo
- 1970 Hsieh Yung-yo
- 1969 Hsieh Yung-yo
- 1968 Hsieh Min-Nan
- 1967 Takaaki Kono
- 1966 Takao Hara
- 1965 Tomoo Ishii
- 1964 Izumi Mori
- 1963 Tomoo Ishii
- 1962 Chen Ching-Po
- 1961 Haruyoshi Kobari
- 1960 Yoshiro Hayashi
- 1959 Haruyoshi Kobari
- 1958 Torakichi Nakamura
- 1957 Torakichi Nakamura
- 1956 Torakichi Nakamura
- 1955 Yoshiro Hayashi
- 1954 Koshio Kurihara
- 1953 Torakichi Nakamura
- 1952 Torakichi Nakamura
- 1951 Torakichi Nakamura
- 1950 Torakichi Nakamura
