= Tsuneyuki Nakajima =

Japanese professional golfer

Tsuneyuki Nakajima 中嶋常幸
Personal information
- Nickname: Tommy
- Nationality: Japan
- Born: 20 October 1954 (age 72) Gunma Prefecture, Japan
- Height: 1.80 m (5 ft 11 in)
- Weight: 88 kg (194 lb; 13.9 st)

Career
- Sport: Golf
- Turned professional: 1975
- Current tour: Japan Golf Tour
- Professional wins: 58
- Highest ranking: 4 (1986)

Number of wins by tour
- Japan Golf Tour: 48 (3rd all-time)
- Other: 10

Best results in major championships
- Masters Tournament: T8: 1986
- PGA Championship: 3rd: 1988
- U.S. Open: T9: 1987
- The Open Championship: T8: 1986

Achievements and awards
- PGA of Japan Tour money list winner: 1982, 1983, 1985, 1986

Tsuneyuki "Tommy" Nakajima (Japanese: 中嶋常幸; born 20 October 1954) is a Japanese professional golfer.

== Career ==
Nakajima was born in Gunma. He turned professional in 1975. He has won 48 events on the Japan Golf Tour, ranking third on the most Japan Golf Tour wins list. He also was the leading money winner four times in five years: 1982, 1983, 1985 and 1986. He is second on the career money list (through 2009).

Nakajima featured in the top 5 of the Official World Golf Rankings and was ranked in the top-10 for 85 weeks from their debut in 1986 to 1987. He ranked as high as fifth on its predecessor McCormack's World Golf Rankings.

At the 1978 Masters Tournament, Nakajima made a 13 on the par-5 13th hole. After hitting his fourth shot into Rae's Creek, Nakajima elected to play the ball rather than take a drop. He popped the ball straight up and it landed on his foot, causing a two-stroke penalty. When he handed the club to his caddie, it slipped out of his hand and fell into the creek, incurring another two-stroke penalty. He chipped over the green, chipped back on and two-putted for the highest single-hole score in the history of the tournament.

Also in 1978, Nakajima was in contention at The Open Championship on the third day at St Andrews until he putted into – and then took four attempts to escape from – the Road Hole bunker at the 17th for a quintuple bogey, which led the British tabloids to christen that bunker, for a while, "the Sands of Nakajima". Nakajima's best finish in a major was third at the 1988 PGA Championship.

He would also feature in an epic match at the 1982 Suntory World Match Play Championship at Wentworth when he lost to Sandy Lyle only after an extended playoff.

== Amateur wins ==
this list may be incomplete

- 1973 Japan Amateur Championship

== Professional wins (58) ==
=== Japan Golf Tour wins (48) ===
No.	Date	Tournament	Winning score	Margin of victory	Runner(s)-up
1	24 Oct 1976	Golf Digest Tournament	−9 (68-73-67-71=279)	2 strokes	(Japan) Kikuo Arai
2	25 Sep 1977	Japan PGA Championship	−11 (73-65-67-72=277)	2 strokes	(Japan) Teruo Sugihara, (Japan) Yoshitaka Yamamoto
3	1 Jun 1980	Mitsubishi Galant Tournament	−12 (65-71-72-68=276)	4 strokes	(Japan) Yoshihisa Iwashita, (Australia) Graham Marsh
4	25 Apr 1982	Dunlop International Open^{1}	−12 (71-66-68-71=276)	5 strokes	(Japan) Saburo Fujiki
5	9 May 1982	Fujisankei Classic	−7 (67-73-66-71=277)	Playoff	(Australia) Graham Marsh
6	1 Jul 1982	Naganoken Open	−7 (70-67=137)	1 stroke	(Japan) Yoshiharu Takai
7	15 Aug 1982	JPGA East-West Tournament	−17 (65-62=127)	6 strokes	(Japan) Norio Suzuki
8	5 Dec 1982	Golf Nippon Series	−17 (72-72-66-73=283)	2 strokes	(Japan) Fujio Kobayashi
9	20 Mar 1983	Shizuoka Open	−5 (72-72-68-71=283)	4 strokes	(Japan) Takashi Kurihara, (Japan) Masaji Kusakabe
10	15 May 1983	Japan PGA Match-Play Championship	38 holes		(Japan) Hideto Shigenobu
11	22 May 1983	Mitsubishi Galant Tournament (2)	−10 (65-70-71-72=278)	6 strokes	(Taiwan) Lu Hsi-chuen
12	31 Jul 1983	Japan PGA Championship (2)	−9 (66-72-69-72=279)	2 strokes	(Japan) Isao Aoki
13	14 Aug 1983	JPGA East-West Tournament (2)	−5 (68-71=139)	Playoff	(Japan) Saburo Fujiki
14	11 Sep 1983	Suntory Open	−14 (66-73-67-68=274)	2 strokes	(Japan) Saburo Fujiki
15	18 Sep 1983	ANA Sapporo Open	−6 (71-70-72-69=282)	5 strokes	(Japan) Isao Aoki
16	13 Nov 1983	Goldwin Cup Japan vs USA	−3 (76-65=141)	1 stroke	(United States) Hale Irwin
17	5 Aug 1984	Japan PGA Championship (3)	−9 (68-69-67-71=275)	2 strokes	(Japan) Seiichi Kanai, (Japan) Shinsaku Maeda, (Japan) Tōru Nakamura
18	2 Sep 1984	Kanto Open	−8 (73-69-65-69=276)		
19	23 Jun 1985	Yomiuri Sapporo Beer Open	−17 (65-71-67-72=275)	3 strokes	(Japan) Katsuji Hasegawa
20	7 Jul 1985	Kanto Pro Championship	−6 (68-70-69-67=274)	3 strokes	(Japan) Koichi Suzuki
21	22 Sep 1985	ANA Open (2)	−11 (68-71-69-69=277)	2 strokes	(Japan) Masahiro Kuramoto
22	13 Oct 1985	Japan Open Golf Championship	−3 (75-68-72-70=285)	2 strokes	(Japan) Hiroshi Makino
23	17 Nov 1985	Taiheiyo Club Masters	−8 (67-72-67-74=280)	Playoff	(Australia) David Graham
24	24 Nov 1985	Dunlop Phoenix Tournament	−13 (67-68-70-70=275)	3 strokes	(Spain) Seve Ballesteros, (Taiwan) Chen Tze-chung
25	18 May 1986	Japan PGA Match-Play Championship (2)	6 and 5		(Japan) Keiichi Kobayashi
26	1 Jun 1986	Mitsubishi Galant Tournament (3)	−8 (73-68-69-70=280)	1 stroke	(Taiwan) Chen Tze-ming
27	29 Jun 1986	Mizuno Open	−13 (69-65-68-37=239) (Note: Shortened to 63 holes due to weather.)	6 strokes	(Japan) Tsukasa Watanabe
28	29 Jun 1986	Kanto Pro Championship	−19 (68-69-65-67=269)	3 strokes	(Japan) Naomichi Ozaki
29	12 Oct 1986	Japan Open Golf Championship (2)	−4 (70-73-72-69=284)	1 stroke	(Japan) Isao Aoki, (Japan) Masashi Ozaki
30	19 Oct 1986	Polaroid Cup Golf Digest Tournament (2)	−9 (68-68-67-72=275)	Playoff	(United States) David Ishii
31	4 Oct 1987	Tokai Classic	−6 (71-72-73-66=282)	1 stroke	(Japan) Masashi Ozaki
32	1 Jul 1990	Kanto Pro Championship (2)	−13 (67-67-68-69=271)	3 strokes	(Japan) Kiyoshi Murota
33	16 Sep 1990	ANA Open (3)	−11 (69-70-68-70=277)	3 strokes	(Japan) Masashi Ozaki
34	7 Oct 1990	Japan Open Golf Championship (3)	−7 (68-71-73-69=281)	2 strokes	(Japan) Masashi Ozaki
35	23 Jun 1991	Yomiuri Sapporo Beer Open (2)	−16 (65-65-71-71=272)	3 strokes	(Canada) Rick Gibson
36	13 Oct 1991	Japan Open Golf Championship (4)	+2 (72-74-71-73=290)	Playoff	(Japan) Noboru Sugai
37	24 May 1992	Pepsi Ube Kosan Open	−13 (67-72-64-72=275)	5 strokes	(Japan) Hirofumi Miyase
38	2 Aug 1992	NST Niigata Open	−13 (70-68-67-70=275)	2 strokes	(Japan) Shigenori Mori
39	6 Sep 1992	Japan PGA Match-Play Championship Promise Cup (3)	3 and 1		(Japan) Naomichi Ozaki
40	19 Sep 1993	ANA Open (4)	−14 (67-67-67-73=274)	4 strokes	(Japan) Naomichi Ozaki, (Australia) Peter Senior, (Japan) Katsunari Takahashi
41	5 Dec 1993	Golf Nippon Series Hitachi Cup (2)	−18 (69-65-69-67=270)	3 strokes	(Japan) Shigeki Maruyama
42	20 Mar 1994	Dydo Shizuoka Open	−8 (71-71-69-69=280)	Playoff	(Japan) Tōru Nakamura
43	17 Apr 1994	Tsuruya Open	−9 (68-70-70-71=279)	Playoff	(Japan) Tsutomu Higa
44	22 May 1994	Pepsi Ube Kosan Open (2)	−16 (65-67-67-69=268)	3 strokes	(Japan) Tsukasa Watanabe
45	7 May 1995	Fujisankei Classic (2)	−12 (66-70-70-66=272)	2 strokes	(Japan) Masahiro Kuramoto
46	2 Jun 2002	Diamond Cup Tournament (4)	−19 (67-66-68-68=269)	2 strokes	(Japan) Tomohiro Kondo, (Japan) Hirofumi Miyase, (United States) Christian Peña
47	17 Nov 2002	Mitsui Sumitomo Visa Taiheiyo Masters (2)	−16 (69-66-67-70=272)	1 stroke	(Japan) Hidemichi Tanaka
48	12 Nov 2006	Mitsui Sumitomo Visa Taiheiyo Masters (3)	−13 (71-68-71-65=275)	1 stroke	(Japan) Toru Taniguchi

^{1}Co-sanctioned by the Asia Golf Circuit

Japan Golf Tour playoff record (7–6)

No.	Year	Tournament	Opponent(s)	Result
1	1978	Japan PGA Championship	(Japan) Fujio Kobayashi	Lost to birdie on first extra hole
2	1981	Golf Digest Tournament	(Japan) Toyotake Nakao	Lost to par on fifth extra hole
3	1982	Fujisankei Classic	(Australia) Graham Marsh	Won with par on first extra hole
4	1983	JPGA East-West Tournament	(Japan) Saburo Fujiki	Won with birdie on second extra hole
5	1985	Taiheiyo Club Masters	(Australia) David Graham	Won with birdie on first extra hole
6	1986	Polaroid Cup Golf Digest Tournament	(United States) David Ishii	Won with par on fifth extra hole
7	1990	Golf Nippon Series Hitachi Cup	(Japan) Naomichi Ozaki	Lost to birdie on third extra hole
8	1991	Japan Open Golf Championship	(Japan) Noboru Sugai	Won with par on first extra hole
9	1992	Japan PGA Championship	(Japan) Masahiro Kuramoto	Lost to par on second extra hole
10	1994	Dydo Shizuoka Open	(Japan) Tōru Nakamura	Won with par on first extra hole
11	1994	Tsuruya Open	(Japan) Tsutomu Higa	Won with par on second extra hole
12	2002	JCB Classic Sendai	(Japan) Toru Suzuki	Lost to par on second extra hole
13	2004	JCB Classic Sendai	(Japan) Takashi Kamiyama, (Japan) Tomohiro Kondo	Kamiyama won with birdie on first extra hole

=== Other wins (5) ===
- 1976 Mizuno Pro Rookies Tournament, Young Lions Tournament
- 1977 Young Lions Tournament, Nihon Kokudo Keikaku Summers
- 1986 Nissan Cup Individual Trophy

=== Japan Senior PGA Tour wins (5) ===
- 2005 Japan Senior Open
- 2006 Japan PGA Senior Championship, Japan Senior Open
- 2008 Japan Senior Open
- 2013 Starts Senior Golf Tournament

== Results in major championships ==
Tournament	1978	1979
Masters Tournament	CUT	
U.S. Open		
The Open Championship	T17	CUT
PGA Championship		

Tournament	1980	1981	1982	1983	1984	1985	1986	1987	1988	1989
Masters Tournament				T16	T33	T47	T8	CUT	T33	CUT
U.S. Open				T26	CUT		T53	T9	T32	
The Open Championship					T36		T8	T59		
PGA Championship				CUT	T10	CUT	T47	CUT	3	

Tournament	1990	1991	1992	1993	1994	1995	1996	1997	1998	1999
Masters Tournament		T10	CUT			CUT				
U.S. Open										
The Open Championship			CUT		T55	T49				
PGA Championship		CUT	T21	CUT	T61	CUT	T52			

Tournament	2000	2001	2002
Masters Tournament			
U.S. Open			
The Open Championship			CUT
PGA Championship			

Top 10
Did not play

CUT = missed the half-way cut
"T" indicates a tie for a place

=== Summary ===
Tournament	Wins	2nd	3rd	Top-5	Top-10	Top-25	Events	Cuts made
Masters Tournament	0	0	0	0	2	3	11	6
U.S. Open	0	0	0	0	1	1	5	4
The Open Championship	0	0	0	0	1	2	9	6
PGA Championship	0	0	1	1	2	3	12	6
Totals	0	0	1	1	6	9	37	22

- Most consecutive cuts made – 4 (1986 Masters – 1986 PGA)
- Longest streak of top-10s – 1 (six times)

== Results in The Players Championship ==
Tournament	1983	1984	1985	1986	1987	1988	1989
The Players Championship	T16	T54	CUT	T64	T15	T27	CUT

CUT = missed the halfway cut
"T" indicates a tie for a place

== Team appearances ==
- World Cup (representing Japan): 1996
- Nissan Cup/Kirin Cup (representing Japan): 1985, 1986 (winners), 1987, 1988
- Dunhill Cup (representing Japan): 1986
- Dynasty Cup (representing Japan): 2003

== See also ==
- List of golfers with most Japan Golf Tour wins
