= Golf Nippon Series =

Coordinates: 35.621°N 139.491°E

Golf Nippon Series JT Cup
Tournament information
- Location: Inagi, Tokyo
- Established: 1963
- Course: Tokyo Yomiuri Country Club
- Par: 70
- Length: 7,023 yards (6,422 m)
- Tour: Japan Golf Tour
- Format: Stroke play
- Prize fund: ¥130,000,000
- Month played: December

Tournament record score
- Aggregate: 262 Masashi Ozaki (1996)
- To par: −26 as above

Current champion
- (Japan) Takashi Ogiso

Final champion
- Location in Japan Location in Tokyo

The Golf Nippon Series (ゴルフ日本シリーズJTカップ, Gorufu nihon shirīzu jei-tī kappu) is a professional golf tournament on the Japan Golf Tour. First played in 1963, it is one of the tour's four major championships. Since 1995, it has been held at the Tokyo Yomiuri Country Club in Inagi, Tokyo.

== History ==
From its inception in 1963 to 1972 the field was limited to the winners of six important tournaments in Japan: Japan Open, Japan PGA Championship, Kansai Open, Kansai Pro Championship, Kanto Open and Kanto Pro Championship. In some years a player won two of these event and the field was reduced further, to five.

It has recently been one of the season-ending events on the tour with a limited field consisting of the top 30 players from the money list and that season's tournament winners.

Since 1998 the tournament has been titled the Golf Nippon Series JT Cup, under a sponsorship agreement with Japan Tobacco. It was sponsored by Hitachi from 1988 to 1997, during which time it was titled the Golf Nippon Series Hitachi Cup.

== Prize money ==
Since 2009 the prize money has been ¥130,000,000, with ¥40,000,000 going to the winner, except in 2011 when the event was reduced to 54 holes and prize money was reduced by 25%. In 1988 prize money was ¥50,000,000, with ¥14,000,000 for the winner, increasing to ¥60,000,000, with ¥15,000,000 winner from 1989 to 1992. From 1993 to 2008 prize money was ¥100,000,000, with ¥30,000,000 for the winner.

== Tournament hosts ==
Years	Venue	Location
1963 (co-hosts)	Murasaki Country Club, Sumire Course	Noda, Chiba
1963–90 (co-hosts), 1992, 1994	Yomiuri Country Club	Nishinomiya, Hyōgo
1964–90 (co-hosts), 1991, 1993, 1995–present	Tokyo Yomiuri Country Club	Inagi, Tokyo

From 1963 to 1990 the event was played at two venues, one near Ozaki and another near Tokyo. The first two rounds were played at one venue and, after a travel day, the remaining two rounds were played at the second venue.

== Winners ==
Japan Golf Tour (Japan major)	2000–
Japan Golf Tour (Regular)	1974–1999
Pre-Japan Golf Tour	1963–1973

#	Year	Winner	Score	To par	Margin of victory	Runner(s)-up
Golf Nippon Series JT Cup
62nd	2025	(Japan) Takashi Ogiso	267	−13	2 strokes	(Japan) Yusaku Hosono
61st	2024	(South Africa) Shaun Norris	268	−12	2 strokes	(Japan) Naoyuki Kataoka
60th	2023	(Japan) Taiga Semikawa	265	−15	1 stroke	(Japan) Takumi Kanaya (Japan) Keita Nakajima
59th	2022	(Japan) Hideto Tanihara (2)	268	−12	1 stroke	(Japan) Hiroshi Iwata (Japan) Daijiro Izumida (United States) Chan Kim
58th	2021	(Japan) Hideto Tanihara	268	−12	2 strokes	(Japan) Yūsaku Miyazato
57th	2020	(United States) Chan Kim	272	−8	1 stroke	(Japan) Hiroshi Iwata (Japan) Tomoharu Otsuki (Japan) Hideto Tanihara
56th	2019	(Japan) Ryo Ishikawa (2)	272	−8	Playoff	(Australia) Brad Kennedy
55th	2018	(Japan) Satoshi Kodaira	272	−8	Playoff	(South Korea) Hwang Jung-gon (Japan) Ryo Ishikawa
54th	2017	(Japan) Yūsaku Miyazato (2)	265	−15	6 strokes	(South Africa) Shaun Norris
53rd	2016	(South Korea) Park Sang-hyun	267	−13	1 stroke	(Japan) Yuta Ikeda (South Korea) Kim Kyung-tae (Japan) Satoshi Kodaira
52nd	2015	(Japan) Ryo Ishikawa	266	−14	5 strokes	(Japan) Yoshinori Fujimoto (Japan) Koumei Oda
51st	2014	(Japan) Katsumasa Miyamoto (3)	271	−9	1 stroke	(Thailand) Prayad Marksaeng
50th	2013	(Japan) Yūsaku Miyazato	267	−13	3 strokes	(China) Wu Ashun
49th	2012	(Japan) Hiroyuki Fujita (3)	262	−18	5 strokes	(United States) Han Lee (Japan) Toshinori Muto
48th	2011	(Japan) Hiroyuki Fujita (2)	200 (Note: Shortened to 54 holes due to weather.)	−10	Playoff	(Japan) Toru Taniguchi
47th	2010	(Japan) Hiroyuki Fujita	265	−15	1 stroke	(Japan) Toru Taniguchi
46th	2009	(Japan) Shigeki Maruyama (2)	271	−9	Playoff	(South Korea) Kim Kyung-tae
45th	2008	(India) Jeev Milkha Singh (2)	268	−12	2 strokes	(Australia) Brendan Jones (New Zealand) David Smail (Japan) Taichi Teshima
44th	2007	(Australia) Brendan Jones	269	−11	1 stroke	(Japan) Toru Taniguchi
43rd	2006	(India) Jeev Milkha Singh	269	−11	1 stroke	(Japan) Nobuhiro Masuda
42nd	2005	(Japan) Yasuharu Imano	269	−11	2 strokes	(Japan) Shinichi Yokota
41st	2004	(Australia) Paul Sheehan	266	−14	4 strokes	(Japan) Katsumasa Miyamoto (South Korea) Yang Yong-eun
40th	2003	(Japan) Tetsuji Hiratsuka	264	−16	3 strokes	(Japan) Toshimitsu Izawa
39th	2002	(Japan) Shingo Katayama (2)	261	−19	9 strokes	(New Zealand) David Smail
38th	2001	(Japan) Katsumasa Miyamoto (2)	268	−12	1 stroke	(Japan) Toshimitsu Izawa (Japan) Tsuneyuki Nakajima
37th	2000	(Japan) Shingo Katayama	271	−9	3 strokes	(Japan) Hirofumi Miyase
36th	1999	(Japan) Kazuhiko Hosokawa	270	−10	2 strokes	(Japan) Toshimitsu Izawa
35th	1998	(Japan) Katsumasa Miyamoto	275	−5	Playoff	(Japan) Masashi Ozaki
Golf Nippon Series Hitachi Cup
34th	1997	(Japan) Shigeki Maruyama	268	−16	2 strokes	(Japan) Tateo Ozaki
33rd	1996	(Japan) Masashi Ozaki (7)	262	−26	4 strokes	(Japan) Shigeki Maruyama
32nd	1995	(Japan) Masashi Ozaki (6)	272	−16	2 strokes	(Japan) Shigenori Mori (Japan) Tsuneyuki Nakajima
31st	1994	(Japan) Hisayuki Sasaki	270	−14	1 stroke	(Japan) Naomichi Ozaki
30th	1993	(Japan) Tsuneyuki Nakajima (2)	270	−18	3 strokes	(Japan) Shigeki Maruyama
29th	1992	(Taiwan) Chen Tze-ming	280	−8	1 stroke	(United States) Todd Hamilton
28th	1991	(Japan) Naomichi Ozaki (3)	268	−20	8 strokes	(Japan) Tsuneyuki Nakajima (Japan) Nobumitsu Yuhara
27th	1990	(Japan) Naomichi Ozaki (2)	275	−13	Playoff	(Japan) Tsuneyuki Nakajima
26th	1989	(Japan) Akiyoshi Ohmachi	278	−10	2 strokes	(Japan) Tsuneyuki Nakajima (Japan) Katsuyoshi Tomori
25th	1988	(Japan) Naomichi Ozaki	275	−13	5 strokes	(Japan) Isao Aoki
Golf Nippon Series
24th	1987	(Japan) Isao Aoki (4) (United States) David Ishii	138 (Note: Shortened to 36 holes due to snow; with the final round being cancelled Aoki and Ishii were declared joint winners.)	−7	Title shared	
23rd	1986	(Japan) Tōru Nakamura (2)	275	−15	2 strokes	(Japan) Isao Aoki
22nd	1985	(Japan) Tateo Ozaki	279	−11	2 strokes	(Japan) Masahiro Kuramoto
21st	1984	(Japan) Tōru Nakamura	267	−23	7 strokes	(Japan) Masahiro Kuramoto
20th	1983	(Japan) Isao Aoki (3)	281	−9	1 stroke	(Japan) Masahiro Kuramoto
19th	1982	(Japan) Tsuneyuki Nakajima	283	−7	2 strokes	(Japan) Fujio Kobayashi
18th	1981	(Japan) Yutaka Hagawa	135	−9	Playoff	(Japan) Isao Aoki
17th	1980	(Japan) Masashi Ozaki (5)	283	−7	2 strokes	(Japan) Isao Aoki
16th	1979	(Japan) Isao Aoki (2)	276	−14	13 strokes	(Japan) Kikuo Arai (Japan) Tōru Nakamura
15th	1978	(Japan) Isao Aoki	282	−8	1 stroke	(Japan) Haruo Yasuda
14th	1977	(Japan) Masashi Ozaki (4)	275	−15	4 strokes	(Japan) Isao Aoki
13th	1976	(Japan) Shinsaku Maeda	285	−5	3 strokes	(Japan) Haruo Yasuda
12th	1975	(Japan) Takashi Murakami	283	−7	1 stroke	(Japan) Seiichi Kanai (Japan) Kosaku Shimada
11th	1974	(Japan) Masashi Ozaki (3)	280	−10	4 strokes	(Japan) Takashi Murakami
10th	1973	(Japan) Teruo Sugihara (3)	276	−14	2 strokes	(Japan) Haruo Yasuda
9th	1972	(Japan) Masashi Ozaki (2)	280	−10	Playoff	(Japan) Teruo Sugihara
8th	1971	(Japan) Masashi Ozaki	284	−6	1 stroke	(Japan) Teruo Sugihara
7th	1970	(Japan) Teruo Sugihara (2)	284	−6	3 strokes	(Japan) Kosaku Shimada
6th	1969	(Japan) Hideyo Sugimoto	291	+1	1 stroke	(Japan) Shigeru Uchida (Japan) Haruo Yasuda
5th	1968	(Japan) Takaaki Kono (2)	283	−7	3 strokes	(Japan) Shiro Matsuda
4th	1967	(Japan) Takaaki Kono	281	−9	11 strokes	(Japan) Tadashi Kitta (Japan) Seiichi Sato
1966: No tournament (Note: Tokyo Yomiuri Country Club hosted the 1966 Canada Cup.)
3rd	1965	(Japan) Teruo Sugihara	284	−6	11 strokes	(Japan) Tadashi Kitta
2nd	1964	(Taiwan) Chen Ching-Po	284	−6	2 strokes	(Japan) Hideyo Sugimoto
1st	1963	(Japan) Tomoo Ishii	288	−2	8 strokes	(Japan) Koichi Ono
