= Tokai Classic =

Vantelin Tokai Classic
Tournament information
- Location: Miyoshi, Aichi, Japan
- Established: 1970
- Courses: Miyoshi Country Club (West Course)
- Par: 71
- Length: 7,300 yards (6,700 m)
- Tour: Japan Golf Tour
- Format: Stroke play
- Prize fund: ¥110,000,000
- Month played: September

Tournament record score
- Aggregate: 267 Takahiro Hataji (2024); 267 Suguru Shimoke (2025)
- To par: −18 Yang Yong-eun (2005)

Current champion
- (Japan) Yuto Katsuragawa

Location map
- Location in Japan Location in the Aichi Prefecture

The Tokai Classic (東海クラシック, Tōkai kurashikku) is a professional golf tournament on the Japan Golf Tour. It was founded in 1970 and is played at the Miyoshi Country Club (West Course), Miyoshi, Aichi. It is usually held in October. The purse in 2019 was ¥110,000,000 with ¥22,000,000 going to the winner.

== Winners ==
Year	Winner	Score	To par	Margin of victory	Runner(s)-up	Ref.
Vantelin Tokai Classic
2026	(Japan) Yuto Katsuragawa	272	−12	1 stroke	(Japan) Hiroki Tanaka	
2025	(Japan) Suguru Shimoke	267	−17	1 stroke	(Japan) Kazuki Yasumori	
2024	(Japan) Takahiro Hataji	267	−17	1 stroke	(Japan) Takumi Kanaya	
2023	(Japan) Yuta Kinoshita	269	−15	1 stroke	(Japan) Rikuya Hoshino	
2022	(Japan) Riki Kawamoto	271	−13	1 stroke	(Japan) Yuto Katsuragawa	
2021	(United States) Chan Kim	270	−14	2 strokes	(Japan) Yuta Ikeda (Japan) Jinichiro Kozuma (Japan) Tomoharu Otsuki	
2020	Cancelled due to the COVID-19 pandemic					
Tokai Classic
2019	(South Africa) Shaun Norris	275	−9	1 stroke	(Japan) Shota Akiyoshi (Japan) Ryuko Tokimatsu	
Top Cup Tokai Classic
2018	(Philippines) Angelo Que	271	−17	2 strokes	(Australia) Won Joon Lee (South Korea) Yang Yong-eun	
2017	(Japan) Satoshi Kodaira	274	−14	1 stroke	(Japan) Ryuko Tokimatsu	
2016	(Japan) Daisuke Kataoka	272	−16	1 stroke	(Japan) Yuta Ikeda	
2015	(South Korea) Kim Hyung-sung	276	−12	Playoff	(Japan) Shingo Katayama	
2014	(South Korea) Kim Seung-hyuk	281	−7	1 stroke	(South Korea) Hwang Jung-gon (South Korea) Kim Hyung-sung	
Coca-Cola Tokai Classic
2013	(Japan) Shingo Katayama	281	−7	Playoff	(Japan) Hidemasa Hoshino (Japan) Satoshi Tomiyama	
2012	(South Korea) Ryu Hyun-woo	282	−6	Playoff	(Japan) Shingo Katayama	
2011	(South Korea) Bae Sang-moon	281	−7	1 stroke	(Japan) Tadahiro Takayama	
2010	(Japan) Michio Matsumura	280	−8	Playoff	(Japan) Takashi Kanemoto (Japan) Hiroyuki Fujita	
2009	(Japan) Ryo Ishikawa	274	−14	1 stroke	(Japan) Takeshi Kajikawa	
2008	(Japan) Toshinori Muto	277	−11	2 strokes	(Japan) Yuta Ikeda	
2007	(Colombia) Camilo Villegas	282	−2	Playoff	(Japan) Toyokazu Fujishima	
2006	(Japan) Hidemasa Hoshino	282	−2	2 strokes	(Japan) Katsumasa Miyamoto	
2005	(South Korea) Yang Yong-eun	270	−18	4 strokes	(Japan) Taichi Teshima	
2004	(Japan) Katsumune Imai	210 (Note: Shortened to 54 holes due to weather.)	−6	Playoff	(Japan) Kazuhiko Hosokawa	
Georgia Tokai Classic
2003	(Japan) Nozomi Kawahara	275	−13	1 stroke	(Japan) Shingo Katayama (Japan) Tsuyoshi Yoneyama	
2002	(Japan) Toru Taniguchi	278	−10	2 strokes	(Japan) Nozomi Kawahara (Myanmar) Zaw Moe	
2001	(Japan) Toshimitsu Izawa (2)	272	−16	2 strokes	(Japan) Tomohiro Kondo (Taiwan) Lin Keng-chi	
Tokai Classic
2000	(Japan) Hirofumi Miyase	276	−12	1 stroke	(Japan) Toru Taniguchi	
1999	(Japan) Kaname Yokoo	274	−14	1 stroke	(Fiji) Vijay Singh	
1998	(Japan) Toshimitsu Izawa	277	−11	3 strokes	(Japan) Nobumitsu Yuhara	
1997	(United States) Brandt Jobe	278	−10	Playoff	(United States) Brian Watts	
1996	(Japan) Masanobu Kimura	280	−8	1 stroke	(Japan) Kazuhiko Hosokawa (United States) Steve Jones (Japan) Shigeki Maruyama	
1995	(Japan) Masayuki Kawamura	285	−3	1 stroke	(Japan) Hideki Kase	
1994	(United States) Corey Pavin	277	−11	1 stroke	(Taiwan) Hsieh Chin-sheng	
1993	(Japan) Saburo Fujiki	274	−14	4 strokes	(Japan) Hajime Meshiai	
1992	(United States) Mark O'Meara	277	−11	1 stroke	(United States) Tom Kite	
1991	(Japan) Eiichi Itai	279	−9	4 strokes	(Japan) Nobumitsu Yuhara	
1990	(Australia) Graham Marsh (2)	206	−10	2 strokes	(Japan) Tadami Ueno (Japan) Saburo Fujiki	
1989	(Japan) Isao Aoki (2)	275	−13	5 strokes	(Japan) Pete Izumikawa	
1988	(Australia) Brian Jones	274	−14	3 strokes	(Japan) Koichi Suzuki	
1987	(Japan) Tsuneyuki Nakajima	282	−6	1 stroke	(Japan) Masashi Ozaki	
1986	(Japan) Masahiro Kuramoto (3)	271	−17	9 strokes	(Japan) Shinsaku Maeda	
1985	(Australia) Graham Marsh	278	−10	1 stroke	(Japan) Isao Aoki	
1984	(Japan) Yoshihisa Iwashita	276	−12	2 strokes	(Japan) Masahiro Kuramoto	
1983	(Japan) Masahiro Kuramoto (2)	276	−12	2 strokes	(Japan) Naomichi Ozaki	
1982	(Taiwan) Hsieh Min-Nan	274	−14	5 strokes	(United States) Larry Nelson	
1981	(Japan) Masahiro Kuramoto	209	−7	Playoff	(Japan) Tōru Nakamura (Japan) Hideto Shigenobu (Japan) Fujio Kobayashi	
1980	(United States) Larry Nelson	274	−14	1 stroke	(Japan) Yutaka Hagawa	
1979	(Japan) Tsutomu Irie	275	−13	5 strokes	(Taiwan) Hsieh Min-Nan (Japan) Masaji Kusakabe	
1978	(Japan) Masaji Kusakabe	282	−6	2 strokes	(Japan) Kosaku Shimada	
1977	(Japan) Masashi Ozaki (2)	278	−10	1 stroke	(Japan) Kosaku Shimada	
1976	(Japan) Isao Aoki	283	−5	Playoff	(Japan) Teruo Sugihara (Japan) Shigeru Uchida	
1975	(Japan) Yasuhiro Miyamoto	280	−8	2 strokes	(Japan) Kikuo Arai (Japan) Yoshitaka Yamamoto	
1974	(Japan) Kosaku Shimada	276	−12	2 strokes	(Japan) Teruo Sugihara	
1973	(Japan) Masashi Ozaki	277	−11	1 stroke	(Japan) Isao Aoki	
1972	(Japan) Kikuo Arai	275	−13	1 stroke	(Japan) Takaaki Kono	
1971	(Japan) Shigeru Uchida	283		3 strokes	(United States) Billy Casper	
1970	(Japan) Fujio Ishii	275		Playoff	(Taiwan) Hsieh Min-Nan	

== See also ==
- Ladies Tokai Classic
