= Eitaro Deguchi =

Japanese professional golfer

Personal information
- Nationality: Japan
- Born: 26 May 1948 (age 78) Mie Prefecture, Japan
- Height: 1.70 m (5 ft 7 in)
- Weight: 75 kg (165 lb; 11.8 st)

Career
- Sport: Golf
- Status: Professional
- Former tour: Japan Golf Tour
- Professional wins: 5

Number of wins by tour
- Japan Golf Tour: 5

Eitaro Deguchi (出口 栄太郎, Deguchi Eitarō; born 26 May 1948) is a Japanese professional golfer.

== Career ==
Deguchi played on the Japan Golf Tour, winning five times.

== Professional wins (5) ==
=== PGA of Japan Tour wins (5) ===
No.	Date	Tournament	Winning score	Margin of victory	Runner(s)-up
1	21 Mar 1982	Shizuoka Open	−6 (74-69-71-68=282)	2 strokes	(Japan) Nobumitsu Yuhara
2	26 Jun 1983	Mizuno Tournament	−11 (67-70-69-71=277)	3 strokes	(Taiwan) Hsieh Min-Nan, (Japan) Tsuneyuki Nakajima, (Japan) Shigeru Uchida
3	23 Oct 1983	Bridgestone Tournament	−14 (70-67-69-68=274)	1 stroke	(Taiwan) Hsieh Min-Nan
4	7 Sep 1986	Chubu Open	−7 (71-68-71-71=281)	3 strokes	(Japan) Kakuji Matsui
5	6 Sep 1987	Chubu Open (2)	−14 (71-67-66-70=274)	7 strokes	(Japan) Hiroshi Ishii, (Japan) Masami Ito, (Japan) Masahiro Shiota

== Team appearances ==
- World Cup (representing Japan): 1984
