= Nakamaru =

Nakamaru (written: 中丸) is a Japanese surname. Notable people with the surname include:

- Kaoru Nakamaru (中丸 薫, born 1937), Japanese journalist, television personality and writer
- Yuichi Nakamaru (中丸 雄一, born 1983), Japanese idol, singer-songwriter, actor, television personality and radio host
