= 1982 PGA of Japan Tour =

Golf tour season

1982 PGA of Japan Tour season
- Duration: 18 March 1982 – 5 December 1982
- Number of official events: 45
- Most wins: (Japan) Tsuneyuki Nakajima (5)
- Money list: (Japan) Tsuneyuki Nakajima

The 1982 PGA of Japan Tour was the 10th season of the PGA of Japan Tour, the main professional golf tour in Japan since it was formed in 1973.

== Schedule ==
The following table lists official events during the 1982 season.

Date	Tournament	Location	Purse (¥)	Winner (Note: The number in brackets after each winner's name is the number of PGA of Japan Tour events they had won up to and including that tournament. This information is only shown for PGA of Japan Tour members.)	Other tours (Note: AGC − Asia Golf Circuit.)	Notes
21 Mar	Shizuoka Open	Shizuoka	25,000,000	(Japan) Eitaro Deguchi (1)		
4 Apr	Kuzuha Kokusai Tournament	Osaka	15,000,000	(Japan) Namio Takasu (3)		
11 Apr	Hakuryuko Open	Hiroshima	15,000,000	(Japan) Toshimitsu Kai (1)		
18 Apr	Bridgestone Aso Open	Kumamoto	30,000,000	(Japan) Tōru Nakamura (10)		
25 Apr	Dunlop International Open	Ibaraki	US$150,000	(Japan) Tsuneyuki Nakajima (4)	AGC	
2 May	Chunichi Crowns	Aichi	70,000,000	(United States) Gary Hallberg (n/a)		
9 May	Fujisankei Classic	Shizuoka	40,000,000	(Japan) Tsuneyuki Nakajima (5)		
16 May	Japan PGA Match-Play Championship	Kanagawa	32,000,000	(Japan) Isao Aoki (33)		
23 May	Pepsi Ube Open	Yamaguchi	30,000,000	(Japan) Kikuo Arai (2)		
30 May	Mitsubishi Galant Tournament	Okayama	40,000,000	(Australia) Graham Marsh (14)		
6 Jun	Tohoku Classic	Miyagi	30,000,000	(Japan) Shinsaku Maeda (6)		
13 Jun	Sapporo Tokyu Open	Hokkaidō	30,000,000	(Japan) Yasuhiro Funatogawa (2)		
20 Jun	Yomiuri Open	Hyōgo	30,000,000	(Australia) Terry Gale (1)		
27 Jun	Mizuno Tournament	Ishikawa	20,000,000	(Japan) Teruo Sugihara (16)		
1 Jul	Naganoken Open	Nagano	20,000,000	(Japan) Tsuneyuki Nakajima (6)		
4 Jul	Kanagawa Open	Kanagawa	15,000,000	(Japan) Akio Toyoda (1)		
10 Jul	Toyamaken Open	Toyama	15,000,000	(Japan) Shigeru Uchida (4)		
11 Jul	Niigata Open	Niigata	15,000,000	(Japan) Yoshitaka Yamamoto (8)		
18 Jul	Gunmaken Open	Gunma	15,000,000	(Japan) Fujio Kobayashi (4)		
25 Jul	Japan PGA Championship	Shiga	32,000,000	(Japan) Masahiro Kuramoto (6)		
1 Aug	Kanto Pro Championship	Tochigi	20,000,000	(Japan) Motomasa Aoki (1)		
1 Aug	Kansai Pro Championship	Fukuoka	15,000,000	(Japan) Hideto Shigenobu (2)		
8 Aug	Descente Cup Hokkoku Open	Ishikawa	30,000,000	(Japan) Kikuo Arai (3)		
15 Aug	JPGA East-West Tournament	Tochigi	18,000,000	(Japan) Tsuneyuki Nakajima (7)		
22 Aug	Nihon Kokudo Keikaku Summers	Chiba	30,000,000	(Japan) Teruo Sugihara (17)		
29 Aug	KBC Augusta	Fukuoka	32,000,000	(Taiwan) Chen Tze-ming (1)		
4 Sep	Chushikoku Open	Hiroshima	5,000,000	(Japan) Masahiro Kuramoto (7)		
5 Sep	Kanto Open	Shizuoka	20,000,000	(Japan) Masashi Ozaki (25)		
5 Sep	Kansai Open	Hyōgo	15,000,000	(Japan) Teruo Sugihara (18)		
5 Sep	Chubu Open	Ishikawa	12,500,000	(Japan) Shigeru Uchida (5)		
5 Sep	Kyusyu Open	Fukuoka	12,000,000	(Japan) Norio Suzuki (15)		
5 Sep	Hokkaido Open	Hokkaidō	5,000,000	(Japan) Koichi Uehara (5)		
12 Sep	Suntory Open	Chiba	50,000,000	(Japan) Pete Izumikawa (1)		
19 Sep	ANA Sapporo Open	Hokkaidō	40,000,000	(Japan) Norio Suzuki (16)		
26 Sep	Hiroshima Open	Hiroshima	30,000,000	(Japan) Takashi Kurihara (4)		
3 Oct	Gene Sarazen Jun Classic	Tochigi	50,000,000	(Japan) Teruo Sugihara (19)		
10 Oct	Tokai Classic	Aichi	35,000,000	(Taiwan) Hsieh Min-Nan (7)		
17 Oct	Golf Digest Tournament	Shizuoka	30,000,000	(Taiwan) Hsieh Min-Nan (8)		
24 Oct	Bridgestone Tournament	Chiba	50,000,000	(Taiwan) Hsieh Min-Nan (9)		
31 Oct	Japan Open Golf Championship	Saitama	50,000,000	(Japan) Akira Yabe (5)		
7 Nov	Goldwin Cup Japan vs USA	Chiba	US$440,000	(United States) Bob Gilder (n/a) (United States) Calvin Peete (n/a)		Title shared
14 Nov	Taiheiyo Club Masters	Shizuoka	80,000,000	(United States) Scott Hoch (n/a)		
21 Nov	Dunlop Phoenix Tournament	Miyazaki	90,000,000	(United States) Calvin Peete (n/a)		
28 Nov	Casio World Open	Kagoshima	65,000,000	(United States) Scott Hoch (n/a)		
5 Dec	Golf Nippon Series	Tokyo	17,000,000	(Japan) Tsuneyuki Nakajima (8)		

== Money list ==
The money list was based on prize money won during the season, calculated in Japanese yen.

Position	Player	Prize money (¥)
1	(Japan) Tsuneyuki Nakajima	68,220,640
2	(Japan) Isao Aoki	45,659,150
3	(Taiwan) Hsieh Min-Nan	45,617,930
4	(Japan) Kikuo Arai	43,827,155
5	(Japan) Teruo Sugihara	43,673,380
