= Bridgestone Aso Open =

Golf tournament

Tournament information
- Location: Aso, Kumamoto, Japan
- Established: 1976
- Course: Aso Golf Club
- Par: 72
- Length: 7,078 yards (6,472 m)
- Tour: Japan Golf Tour
- Format: Stroke play
- Prize fund: ¥70,000,000
- Month played: April
- Final year: 1993

Tournament record score
- Aggregate: 272 Craig Parry (1989)
- To par: −16 as above

Final champion
- (Japan) Shigeru Kawamata
- Location in Japan Location in the Kumamoto Prefecture

The Bridgestone Aso Open was a professional golf tournament that was held in Japan. It was an event on the Japan Golf Tour from 1978 to 1993. From 1983, it was played at the Aso Golf Club near Mount Aso in Kumamoto Prefecture.

Originally contested over 36 holes as the Aso National Park Open, the tournament was extended to 54 holes in 1981, and then 72 holes from 1982.

== Tournament hosts ==
| Year(s) | Host course | Location |
|---|---|---|
| 1981, 1983–1993 | Aso Golf Club | Aso, Kumamoto |
| 1976–1980, 1982 | Aso Kogen Hotel Golf Course | Ubuyama, Kumamoto |

== Winners ==
| Year | Winner | Score | To par | Margin of victory | Runner(s)-up | Ref. |
Bridgestone Aso Open
| 1993 | (Japan) Shigeru Kawamata | 276 | −12 | 2 strokes | (Japan) Katsunari Takahashi | |
| 1992 | (Australia) Peter Senior | 281 | −7 | 1 stroke | (Canada) Rick Gibson | |
| 1991 | (Japan) Kiyoshi Murota | 208 (Note: Tournament reduced to 54 holes after the first round was cancelled due to heavy rain and thick fog.) | −8 | 2 strokes | (Japan) Taisei Inagaki | |
| 1990 | (Japan) Teruo Sugihara | 213 (Note: Tournament reduced to 54 holes after the first round was cancelled due to rain.) | −3 | 2 strokes | (Japan) Nobumitsu Yuhara | |
| 1989 | (Australia) Craig Parry | 272 | −16 | 6 strokes | (Japan) Yoshiyuki Isomura | |
| 1988 | (Australia) Ian Baker-Finch | 282 | −6 | 1 stroke | (Japan) Tadami Ueno | |
| 1987 | (Japan) Norio Mikami | 280 | −8 | 4 strokes | (United States) David Ishii (Japan) Shuichi Sano | |
| 1986 | (Australia) Brian Jones | 240 (Note: Tournament reduced to 63 holes after play was cancelled on the second day and 27 holes were played on the final day.) | −12 | 1 stroke | (Japan) Nobumitsu Yuhara | |
| 1985 | (Taiwan) Hsieh Min-Nan | 280 | −8 | Playoff | (Japan) Masahiro Kuramoto | |
| 1984 | (Japan) Hideto Shigenobu | 283 | −5 | Playoff | (Japan) Katsuji Hasegawa (Japan) Akira Yabe | |
| 1983 | (Japan) Fujio Kobayashi | 213 | −3 | Playoff | (Japan) Tadami Ueno | |
| 1982 | (Japan) Tōru Nakamura | 283 | −5 | 3 strokes | (Japan) Shigeru Uchida | |
Aso National Park Open
| 1981 | (Japan) Saburo Fujiki | 213 | −3 | 1 stroke | (Japan) Yoshikazu Yokoshima | |
| 1980 | (Japan) Masaji Kusakabe | 109 (Note: Tournament reduced to 27 holes after the final round was cut to 9 holes due to fog.) | +1 | 1 stroke | (Japan) Yurio Akitomi (Japan) Namio Takasu | |
| 1979 | (Japan) Takashi Kurihara | 149 | +5 | Playoff | (Japan) Shinsaku Maeda (Japan) Haruo Yasuda | |
| 1978 | (Japan) Tadami Ueno | 143 | −1 | Playoff | (Japan) Tatsuo Fujima (Japan) Teruo Suzumura | |
| 1977 | (Japan) Yukio Noguchi | 213 | −3 | 2 strokes | (Japan) Kikuo Arai (Japan) Seiichi Kanai | |
| 1976 | (Japan) Norio Suzuki | 138 | −6 | 2 strokes | (Japan) Tomomi Suzuki | |
