= 1986 PGA of Japan Tour =

Golf tour season

1986 PGA of Japan Tour season
- Duration: 20 March 1986 – 14 December 1986
- Number of official events: 40
- Most wins: (Japan) Tsuneyuki Nakajima (6)
- Money list: (Japan) Tsuneyuki Nakajima

The 1986 PGA of Japan Tour was the 14th season of the PGA of Japan Tour, the main professional golf tour in Japan since it was formed in 1973.

== Schedule ==
The following table lists official events during the 1986 season.

Date	Tournament	Location	Purse (¥)	Winner (Note: The number in brackets after each winner's name is the number of PGA of Japan Tour events they had won up to and including that tournament. This information is only shown for PGA of Japan Tour members.)	OWGR points	Other tours (Note: AGC − Asia Golf Circuit.)	Notes
23 Mar	Shizuoka Open	Shizuoka	35,000,000	(Japan) Akiyoshi Ohmachi (1)	10		
13 Apr	Pocari Sweat Open	Hiroshima	40,000,000	(Japan) Hajime Meshiai (2)	10		
20 Apr	Bridgestone Aso Open	Kumamoto	35,000,000	(Australia) Brian Jones (4)	10		
27 Apr	Dunlop International Open	Ibaraki	50,000,000	(Japan) Hideto Shigenobu (5)	20	AGC	
4 May	Chunichi Crowns	Aichi	90,000,000	(United States) David Ishii (2)	40		
11 May	Fujisankei Classic	Shizuoka	40,000,000	(Japan) Masashi Ozaki (28)	20		
18 May	Japan PGA Match-Play Championship	Ibaraki	40,000,000	(Japan) Tsuneyuki Nakajima (25)	20		
24 May	Pepsi Ube Open	Yamaguchi	40,000,000	(Japan) Naomichi Ozaki (5)	20		
1 Jun	Mitsubishi Galant Tournament	Ibaraki	56,000,000	(Japan) Tsuneyuki Nakajima (26)	20		
8 Jun	Tohoku Classic	Miyagi	40,000,000	(Japan) Teruo Sugihara (23)	20		
15 Jun	Sapporo Tokyu Open	Hokkaidō	40,000,000	(Japan) Isao Aoki (38)	20		
22 Jun	Yomiuri Sapporo Beer Open	Hyōgo	50,000,000	(Japan) Koichi Suzuki (1)	20		
29 Jun	Mizuno Open	Ishikawa	50,000,000	(Japan) Tsuneyuki Nakajima (27)	20		
6 Jul	Kansai Pro Championship	Okayama	25,000,000	(Japan) Teruo Sugihara (24)	4		
6 Jul	Kanto Pro Championship	Miyagi	30,000,000	(Japan) Tsuneyuki Nakajima (28)	10		
27 Jul	Japan PGA Championship	Gifu	50,000,000	(Japan) Isao Aoki (39)	40		
3 Aug	NST Niigata Open	Niigata	35,000,000	(United States) David Ishii (3)	20		
17 Aug	Nikkei Cup	Shiga	40,000,000	(Japan) Masashi Ozaki (29)	20		
24 Aug	Maruman Open	Ishikawa	50,000,000	(Japan) Masashi Ozaki (30)	20		
31 Aug	KBC Augusta	Fukuoka	42,000,000	(Japan) Isao Aoki (40)	20		
7 Sep	Chushikoku Open	Yamaguchi	15,000,000	(Japan) Tadami Ueno (5)	4		
7 Sep	Kansai Open	Hyōgo	20,000,000	(Japan) Yoshiyuki Isomura (1)	4		
7 Sep	Kanto Open	Ibaraki	30,000,000	(Japan) Isao Aoki (41)	10		
7 Sep	Kyusyu Open	Kagoshima	15,000,000	(Japan) Kinpachi Yoshimura (2)	4		
7 Sep	Chubu Open	Aichi	15,000,000	(Japan) Eitaro Deguchi (4)	4		
7 Sep	Hokkaido Open	Hokkaidō	7,000,000	(Japan) Katsunari Takahashi (6)	4		
14 Sep	Suntory Open	Chiba	60,000,000	(Australia) Graham Marsh (17)	20		
21 Sep	ANA Open	Hokkaidō	50,000,000	(Japan) Masahiro Kuramoto (14)	20		
28 Sep	Gene Sarazen Jun Classic	Tochigi	56,000,000	(Japan) Masashi Ozaki (31)	20		
5 Oct	Tokai Classic	Aichi	50,000,000	(Japan) Masahiro Kuramoto (15)	20		
12 Oct	Japan Open Golf Championship	Kanagawa	60,000,000	(Japan) Tsuneyuki Nakajima (29)	40		
19 Oct	Polaroid Cup Golf Digest Tournament	Shizuoka	60,000,000	(Japan) Tsuneyuki Nakajima (30)	20		
26 Oct	Bridgestone Open	Chiba	70,000,000	(Japan) Tateo Ozaki (8)	40		
2 Nov	ABC Japan-U.S. Match	Hyōgo	65,000,000	(United States) Curtis Strange (n/a)	n/a		
9 Nov	Hiroshima Open	Hiroshima	40,000,000	(Japan) Tōru Nakamura (15)	10		
16 Nov	Visa Taiheiyo Club Masters	Shizuoka	80,000,000	(Japan) Yasuhiro Funatogawa (4)	40		
23 Nov	Dunlop Phoenix Tournament	Shizuoka	130,000,000	(United States) Bobby Wadkins (n/a)	46		
30 Nov	Casio World Open	Kagoshima	85,000,000	(United States) Scott Hoch (n/a)	40		
7 Dec	Golf Nippon Series	Tokyo	30,000,000	(Japan) Tōru Nakamura (16)	20		
14 Dec	Daikyo Open	Okinawa	60,000,000	(Japan) Tateo Ozaki (9)	10		

== Money list ==
The money list was based on prize money won during the season, calculated in Japanese yen.

Position	Player	Prize money (¥)
1	(Japan) Tsuneyuki Nakajima	90,202,066
2	(Japan) Masashi Ozaki	80,356,632
3	(Japan) Isao Aoki	78,341,666
4	(Japan) Masahiro Kuramoto	53,812,650
5	(United States) David Ishii	52,454,085

== Japan Challenge Tour ==
1986 Japan Challenge Tour season
- Duration: 4 June 1986 – 31 July 1986
- Number of official events: 2

The 1986 Japan Challenge Tour was the second season of the Japan Challenge Tour, the official development tour to the PGA of Japan Tour.

=== Schedule ===
The following table lists official events during the 1986 season.

Date	Tournament	Location	Purse (¥)	Winner (Note: The number in brackets after each winner's name is the number of Japan Challenge Tour events they had won up to and including that tournament. It is rare for someone to accumulate many wins on the Japan Challenge Tour as success at this level usually leads to promotion to the PGA of Japan Tour.)
5 Jun	Mito Green Open	Ibaraki	12,000,000	(Japan) Katsuyoshi Tomori (1)
31 Jul	Kanto Kokusai Open	Tochigi	12,000,000	(Japan) Kiyoshi Nomura (1)
