= Japan PGA Championship =

Professional golf tournament

Japan PGA Championship Senko Group Cup
Tournament information
- Location: Gamō, Shiga, Japan
- Established: 1926
- Course: Gamo Golf Club
- Par: 71
- Length: 7,219 yards (6,601 m)
- Organized by: PGA of Japan
- Tour: Japan Golf Tour
- Format: Stroke play (1961–); Match play (1931–1960)
- Prize fund: ¥150,000,000
- Month played: May

Tournament record score
- Aggregate: 265 Shingo Katayama (2008)
- To par: −23 as above

Current champion
- (Japan) Yusaku Hosono

Final champion
- Location in Japan Location in Gifu

The Japan PGA Championship (日本プロゴルフ選手権大会, Nihon puro gorufu senshuken taikai) is a professional golf tournament on the Japan Golf Tour, and is one of the tour's four major championships. Founded in 1926, it is one of the oldest professional tournaments in Japan, and is played at various courses throughout the country. In 2017, the total purse was ¥150,000,000, with ¥30,000,000 awarded to the winner.

Between 2009 and 2017, the tournament was title sponsored by Nissin Foods.

== Winners ==
Year	Winner	Score	To par	Margin of victory	Runner(s)-up	Venue	Ref.
Japan PGA Championship Senko Group Cup
2026	(Japan) Yusaku Hosono	273	−15	2 strokes	(Japan) Tomohiro Ishizaka (Japan) Ryosuke Kinoshita (South Korea) Song Young-han (Japan) Hiroki Tanaka	Gamo	
Japan PGA Championship
2025	(Japan) Taisei Shimizu	274	−14	Playoff	(Japan) Tatsunori Shogenji	Fuji Country Kani	
2024	(Japan) Yuta Sugiura	268	−18	1 stroke	(Japan) Yuki Inamori (Japan) Taiga Semikawa	Sanko	
2023	(Japan) Kensei Hirata	277	−11	2 strokes	(Japan) Takumi Kanaya (Japan) Taiga Semikawa	Eniwa	
2022	(Japan) Mikumu Horikawa	269	−15	3 strokes	(Japan) Naoyuki Kataoka	Grand Fields	
2021	(South Korea) Kim Seong-hyeon	271	−13	1 stroke	(Japan) Yuta Ikeda (Japan) Yuki Inamori	Nikko	
2020	Cancelled due to the COVID-19 pandemic						
2019	(Japan) Ryo Ishikawa	269	−13	Playoff	(South Korea) Hwang Jung-gon	Ibusuki	
2018	(Japan) Toru Taniguchi (3)	282	−6	Playoff	(Japan) Yoshinori Fujimoto	Boso	
Japan PGA Championship Nissin Cupnoodles Cup
2017	(Japan) Yūsaku Miyazato	276	−12	3 strokes	(Australia) Brad Kennedy	Kanehide Kise	
2016	(Japan) Hideto Tanihara	266	−22	Playoff	(Japan) Toshinori Muto	Hokkaido Classic	
2015	(Australia) Adam Bland	268	−16	3 strokes	(South Korea) Lee Sang-hee	Taiheiyo Club; Kohnan	
2014	(Japan) Taichi Teshima	279	−9	1 stroke	(South Korea) Lee Kyoung-hoon (Japan) Koumei Oda	Golden Valley	
2013	(South Korea) Kim Hyung-sung	279	−5	1 stroke	(Japan) Yoshinori Fujimoto (Japan) Hiroyuki Fujita (Japan) Hideki Matsuyama	Sobu	
2012	(Japan) Toru Taniguchi (2)	284	−4	1 stroke	(Japan) Keiichiro Fukabori	Karasuyamajo	
2011	(Japan) Hiroo Kawai	275	−9	2 strokes	(South Korea) Bae Sang-moon	Ono Toyo	
2010	(Japan) Toru Taniguchi	270	−10	1 stroke	(Japan) Tetsuji Hiratsuka	Passage Kinkai Island	
2009	(Japan) Yuta Ikeda	266	−14	7 strokes	(Japan) Mitsuhiro Tateyama	Eniwa	
Japan PGA Championship
2008	(Japan) Shingo Katayama (2)	265	−23	6 strokes	(China) Liang Wenchong	Raysum	
2007	(Japan) Toshimitsu Izawa	283	−5	1 stroke	(Japan) Satoru Hirota	Kise	
2006	(Japan) Tomohiro Kondo	278	−10	Playoff	(Japan) Katsuyoshi Tomori	Tanigumi	
2005	(South Korea) Hur Suk-ho	272	−10	2 strokes	(Japan) Hideto Tanihara	Tamana	
2004	(South Korea) Hur Suk-ho	202	−14	1 stroke	(Japan) Keiichiro Fukabori	Kochi Kuroshio	
2003	(Japan) Shingo Katayama	271	−17	1 stroke	(South Korea) Hur Suk-ho	Miho	
2002	(Japan) Kenichi Kuboya	279	−9	Playoff	(Japan) Shingo Katayama	Koma	
2001	(United States) Dean Wilson	281	−3	4 strokes	(Japan) Hideki Kase	Queens Hill	
2000	(Japan) Nobuhito Sato	280	−4	1 stroke	(Japan) Shigemasa Higaki (Japan) Satoshi Higashi	Caledonian	
1999	(Japan) Naomichi Ozaki	283	−5	2 strokes	(Japan) Masashi Ozaki	Twin Fields	
1998	(United States) Brandt Jobe	280	−8	Playoff	(Japan) Masashi Ozaki	Grandage	
1997	(Japan) Shigeki Maruyama	272	−16	4 strokes	(Japan) Shusaku Sugimoto	Central; West	
1996	(Japan) Masashi Ozaki (6)	270	−18	8 strokes	(Japan) Shigeki Maruyama	Sanyo; Yoshii	
1995	(Japan) Hisayuki Sasaki	272	−16	4 strokes	(Japan) Kazuhiro Takami	Natsudomari	
1994	(Japan) Hiroshi Gohda	279	−5	1 stroke	(Japan) Masashi Ozaki	Lake Green	
1993	(Japan) Masashi Ozaki (5)	278	−10	1 stroke	(Japan) Tsuyoshi Yoneyama	Sports Shinko	
1992	(Japan) Masahiro Kuramoto (2)	281	−7	Playoff	(Japan) Tsuneyuki Nakajima	Shimoakima	
1991	(Japan) Masashi Ozaki (4)	273	−15	6 strokes	(Japan) Tsukasa Watanabe	Prestige	
1990	(Japan) Hideki Kase	274	−14	5 strokes	(Japan) Saburo Fujiki (Japan) Masahiro Kuramoto	Amanosan	
1989	(Japan) Masashi Ozaki (3)	278	−6	1 stroke	(Japan) Hideki Kase	Karasuyamajo	
1988	(Japan) Tateo Ozaki (2)	268	−20	1 stroke	(Japan) Masashi Ozaki	Ehime	
1987	(United States) David Ishii	280	−8	1 stroke	(Australia) Brian Jones (Japan) Seiichi Kanai	Hamano	
1986	(Japan) Isao Aoki (3)	272	−16	4 strokes	(Japan) Masashi Ozaki	Nihon Line; West	
1985	(Japan) Tateo Ozaki	288	−4	Playoff	(Japan) Seiichi Kanai	Central; East	
1984	(Japan) Tsuneyuki Nakajima (3)	275	−9	2 strokes	(Japan) Seiichi Kanai (Japan) Shinsaku Maeda (Japan) Tōru Nakamura	MIOS Kikukawa	
1983	(Japan) Tsuneyuki Nakajima (2)	279	−9	2 strokes	(Japan) Isao Aoki (Japan) Yutaka Hagawa	Shuun	
1982	(Japan) Masahiro Kuramoto	274	−14	4 strokes	(Taiwan) Hsieh Min-Nan	Meishin Yokkaichi	
1981	(Japan) Isao Aoki (2)	277	−11	4 strokes	(Japan) Tōru Nakamura	Sapporo Korakuen	
1980	(Japan) Yoshitaka Yamamoto	282	−2	1 stroke	(Japan) Seiichi Kanai (Japan) Namio Takasu	Northern; Akagi	
1979	(Taiwan) Hsieh Min-Nan	272	−16	1 stroke	(Japan) Teruo Sugihara	Asami	
1978	(Japan) Fujio Kobayashi	281	−7	Playoff	(Japan) Tsuneyuki Nakajima	Otaru	
1977	(Japan) Tsuneyuki Nakajima	277	−11	3 strokes	(Japan) Teruo Sugihara (Japan) Yoshitaka Yamamoto	Nihon Line; West	
1976	(Japan) Seiichi Kanai (2)	273	−7	Playoff	(Japan) Shichiro Enomoto (Taiwan) Hsieh Min-Nan (Japan) Haruo Yasuda	Kuma	
1975	(Japan) Takashi Murakami	282	−6	Playoff	(Japan) Yoshitaka Yamamoto	Kurashiki	
1974	(Japan) Masashi Ozaki (2)	274	−14	4 strokes	(Japan) Isao Aoki	Omotezao Intl.	
1973	(Japan) Isao Aoki	275	−13	8 strokes	(Japan) Haruo Yasuda	Gifu Seki	
1972	(Japan) Seiichi Kanai	278		2 strokes	(Japan) Masashi Ozaki	Murasaki; Sumire	
1971	(Japan) Masashi Ozaki	282		1 stroke	(Japan) Hideyo Sugimoto	Phoenix	
1970	(Japan) Seiichi Sato	280		1 stroke	(Japan) Akio Kanemoto (Japan) Mitsuhiro Kitta	Mitsukaido	
1969	(Japan) Hiroshi Ishii	277		5 strokes	(Japan) Teruo Sugihara	Kasugai	
1968	(Japan) Kosaku Shimada	282		1 stroke	(Japan) Teruo Suzumura	Narashino	
1967	(Japan) Shozo Miyamoto	276		1 stroke	(Japan) Tomoo Ishii	Miyoshi; West	
1966	(Japan) Mitsutaka Kono (2)	271		3 strokes	(Japan) Shigeru Uchida	Sobu	
1965	(Japan) Mitsutaka Kono	273		6 strokes	(Taiwan) Chen Ching-Po (Japan) Yoshimasa Fujii	Kawagoe	
1964	(Japan) Tadashi Kitta (2)	281		2 strokes	(Japan) Tomoo Ishii	Hirakata	
1963	(Japan) Tadashi Kitta	285		3 strokes	(Japan) Tomoo Ishii	Ryugasaki	
1962	(Japan) Torakichi Nakamura (4)	285		4 strokes	(Japan) Takashi Kitamoto (Japan) Teruo Sugihara	Yokkaichi	
1961	(Japan) Yoshiro Hayashi (4)	286		2 strokes	(Japan) Yoshimasa Fujii	Koga	
1960	(Japan) Ryohei Tanaami	1 hole			(Japan) Kenji Hosoishi	Oarai	
1959	(Japan) Torakichi Nakamura (3)	5 & 4			(Japan) Koichi Ono	Ibaraki	
1958	(Japan) Torakichi Nakamura (2)	3 & 2			(Japan) Koshio Kurihara	Naruo (Inagawa)	
1957	(Japan) Torakichi Nakamura	2 holes			(Japan) Koshio Kurihara	Hodogaya	
1956	(Japan) Yoshiro Hayashi (3)	7 & 6			(Japan) Tsunekichi Arai	Nagoya	
1955	(Japan) Koichi Ono	1 hole			(Japan) Yoshiro Hayashi	Sagami	
1954	(Japan) Shigeru Ishii	7 & 5			(Japan) Koichi Ono	Hirono	
1953	(Taiwan) Chin Sei-Sui (2)	2 & 1			(Japan) Yoshiro Hayashi	Abiko	
1952	(Japan) Seiji Inoue	5 & 3			(Taiwan) Chin Sei-Sui	Sagami	
1951	(Japan) Tetsuo Ishii	3 & 1			(Japan) Torakichi Nakamura	Hirono	
1950	(Japan) Yoshiro Hayashi (2)	9 & 7			(Japan) Koichi Ono	Abiko	
1949	(Japan) Yoshiro Hayashi	293		2 strokes	(Japan) Son Shi Kin	Abiko	
1943–1948: No tournament due to World War II
1942	(Taiwan) Chin Sei-Sui	7 & 6			(Japan) Tokuharu Nobu	Koganei	
1941: No tournament							
1940	(Japan) Toichiro Toda (4)	6 & 5			(Japan) Taketo Fujii	Fukuoka Ōho	
1939	(Japan) Toichiro Toda (3)	3 & 2			(Japan) Tomekichi Miyamoto	Kawana Hotel; Fuji	
1938	(Japan) Toichiro Toda (2)	7 & 5			(Japan) Seiji Inoue	Takarazuka	
1937	(Japan) Iwaichi Uekata	1 hole			(Taiwan) Chin Sei-Sui	Takanodai	
1936	(Japan) Tomekichi Miyamoto (4)	4 & 3			(Japan) Jiro Morioka	Nagoya	
1935	(Japan) Toichiro Toda	7 & 5			(Taiwan) Chin Sei-Sui	Sagami	
1934	(Japan) Tomekichi Miyamoto (3)	3 & 1			(Japan) Osamu Ishii	Hirono	
1933	(Philippines) Larry Montes (2)	6 & 5			(Taiwan) Rin Man-Puku	Fujisawa	
1932	(Philippines) Larry Montes	4 & 3			(Japan) Jiro Morioka	Naruo; Inagawa	
1931	(Japan) Rokuzo Asami (2)	6 & 5			(Taiwan) Chin Sei-Sui	Musashino; Fujigaya	
1930	(Japan) Akira Muraki	304		19 strokes	(Japan) Masakichi Koshimichi (Taiwan) Chin Sei-Sui	Takarazuka	
1929	(Japan) Tomekichi Miyamoto (2)	301		11 strokes	(Japan) Kokichi Yasuda	Mutsumi	
1928	(Japan) Rokuzo Asami	156		1 stroke	(Japan) Tomekichi Miyamoto (Note: Miyamoto defeated Kokichi Yasuda in a playoff for second place.)	Naruo	
1927	(Japan) Kazuichi Nakagami	153		Playoff	(Japan) Tomekichi Miyamoto	Ibaraki	
1926	(Japan) Tomekichi Miyamoto	161		Playoff	(Japan) Kakuji Fukui	Ibaraki	
