= Graham Marsh =

Australian professional golfer (born 1944)

Graham Marsh MBE
Personal information
- Full name: Graham Vivian Marsh
- Nationality: Australia
- Born: 14 January 1944 (age 82) Kalgoorlie, Australia
- Height: 5 ft 11 in (1.80 m)
- Weight: 187 lb (85 kg; 13.4 st)

Career
- Sport: Golf
- College: University of Western Australia; Claremont Teachers College
- Turned professional: 1969
- Former tours: PGA Tour; European Tour; PGA of Japan Tour; Asia Golf Circuit; PGA Tour of Australia; New Zealand Golf Circuit; Champions Tour
- Professional wins: 70

Number of wins by tour
- PGA Tour: 1
- European Tour: 10
- Japan Golf Tour: 20 (Tied-9th all-time)
- PGA Tour of Australasia: 7
- PGA Tour Champions: 6
- Other: 22 (Regular); 4 (Senior)

Best results in major championships
- Masters Tournament: T9: 1976
- PGA Championship: T7: 1978
- U.S. Open: T16: 1979
- The Open Championship: 4th: 1983

Achievements and awards
- New Zealand Golf Circuit money list winner: 1970–71
- Asia Golf Circuit Order of Merit winner: 1972, 1973

Graham Vivian Marsh MBE (born 14 January 1944) is an Australian golfer. In 1968, Marsh turned pro and won several tournaments on the Australasian circuits early in his career. He joined the PGA Tour in the mid-1970s and won the 1977 Heritage Classic. However, he elected to focus the remainder of his career overseas, ultimately winning ten times on the European Tour and twenty times on the Japan Golf Tour. As a senior, he continued with much success on the Champions Tour, winning two senior majors, including the U.S. Senior Open.

== Early life ==
Marsh was born in Kalgoorlie, Western Australia. His brother was cricketer Rod Marsh.

Marsh attended the University of Western Australia and Claremont Teachers College. Marsh is a former mathematics teacher.

== Professional career ==
Marsh's first professional tournament was in May 1968 at South Australian Open. He finished in solo third place. Peter Thomson, writing about the event for The Age, stated that "this talented player seems sure to finish higher before long." In 1970 he played well at New Zealand's Caltex Tournament. Entering the par-5 18th hole he was tied for the lead with Maurice Bembridge and Terry Kendall. However, he could only make par. His competitors played the hole under par to defeat him. Marsh finished in solo third at 287, one behind.

Throughout the 1970s and 1980s Marsh was a regular winner on the European Tour, the Japan Golf Tour and the PGA Tour of Australasia. He also won several events in Asia outside Japan, winning the Asia Golf Circuit overall title in 1972 and 1973, and one on the U.S.-based PGA Tour, the 1977 Heritage Classic. Marsh had an outstanding win rate on the European Tour, where he accumulated eleven titles even though he never played more than seven events in Europe in a season. He also won the Colgate World Match Play Championship, which was not an official money European Tour event at the time, in England in 1977. He had 56 wins in all in his regular career, making him one of the most successful players of his era not to win a major championship.

=== Senior career ===
As a senior, Marsh has played extensively in the United States on the Champions Tour winning six events including two senior majors: the 1997 U.S. Senior Open and the 1999 Tradition. He has also won the Japan Senior Open twice.

Marsh is also active in golf course design through Graham Marsh Golf Design which he established in 1986. The company's early projects were in Australia and Japan, but it later branched out to other parts of Asia, Europe and the United States. His work has included courses such as The Vines Resort (Perth), Palm Meadows Resort (Gold Coast) Old Silo (Kentucky), Twin Creeks Golf and Country Club (New South Wales) and Terrey Hills Golf & Country Club just to name a few. During this era, Marsh was also the chairman of the PGA Tour of Australasia as well.

In 2004, he became the first player on the four main golf tours (PGA Tour, European Tour, Champions Tour or the European Senior Tour) to ace the same hole twice in a tournament when he had a hole-in-one on No. 11 at Royal Portrush Golf Club during the 2004 Senior British Open Championship.

== Awards and honors ==
- In 1977, Marsh was voted Australian Sportsman of the year
- In 1977, Marsh was awarded the Golf Digest Rookie of the Year.
- In 1984, Marsh was made an MBE for services to golf.

== Professional wins (70) ==
=== PGA Tour wins (1) ===
No.	Date	Tournament	Winning score	Margin of victory	Runner-up
1	27 Mar 1977	Heritage Classic	−11 (65-72-67-69=273)	1 stroke	(United States) Tom Watson

=== European Tour wins (10) ===
No.	Date	Tournament	Winning score	Margin of victory	Runner(s)-up
1	30 Jul 1972	Swiss Open	−14 (67-67-66-70=270)	1 stroke	(England) Tony Jacklin
2	6 Aug 1972	German Open	−13 (70-70-67-64=271)	4 strokes	(Wales) Brian Huggett
3	30 Jun 1973	Sunbeam Electric Scottish Open	−2 (72-69-68-77=286)	6 strokes	(England) Peter Oosterhuis
4	25 Sep 1976	Benson & Hedges International Open	−12 (67-66-71-68=272)	2 strokes	(England) Mark James
5	29 Jul 1979	Dutch Open	−3 (71-70-74-70=285)	1 stroke	(Spain) Antonio Garrido, (England) Malcolm Gregson
6	6 Oct 1979	Dunlop Masters	−5 (70-68-72-73=283)	1 stroke	(Japan) Isao Aoki, (England) Neil Coles
7	10 Aug 1980	Benson & Hedges International Open (2)	−16 (65-64-73-70=272)	2 strokes	(South Africa) John Bland
8	6 Sep 1981	Dixcel Tissues European Open	−13 (67-72-68-68=275)	2 strokes	(Spain) Seve Ballesteros
9	13 Jul 1985	Lawrence Batley International Golf Classic	−5 (69-71-70-73=283)	2 strokes	(United States) Rick Hartmann
10	28 Jul 1985	KLM Dutch Open (2)	−6 (68-68-73-73=282)	1 stroke	(West Germany) Bernhard Langer

European Tour playoff record (0–1)

No.	Year	Tournament	Opponent	Result
1	1975	Scandinavian Enterprise Open	(United States) George Burns	Lost to par on first extra hole

=== Other European wins (3) ===
- 1970 Swiss Open
- 1977 Lancome Trophy, Colgate World Match Play Championship

=== PGA of Japan Tour wins (20) ===
No.	Date	Tournament	Winning score	Margin of victory	Runner(s)-up
1	12 Aug 1973	Fujisankei Classic	−16 (68-66-70-68=272)	1 stroke	(Japan) Tōru Nakamura
2	12 May 1974	Fujisankei Classic (2)	−12 (71-67-71-67=276)	1 stroke	(Japan) Tōru Nakamura
3	19 May 1974	Dunlop Tournament	−12 (68-67-68-69=276)	3 strokes	(Japan) Masashi Ozaki, (Japan) Teruo Sugihara
4	26 May 1974	Pepsi-Wilson Tournament	−4 (71-74-72-67=284)	Playoff	(Taiwan) Hsieh Yung-yo
5	3 Nov 1974	Bridgestone Tournament	−10 (67-75-67-69=278)	1 stroke	(Japan) Seiichi Numazawa
6	15 Jun 1975	Sapporo Tokyu Open	−8 (71-71-71-67=280)	1 stroke	(Taiwan) Hsieh Yung-yo, (Japan) Shozo Miyamoto
7	29 Aug 1976	KBC Augusta	−9 (69-69-69=207) (Note: Shortened to 36/54 holes due to weather.)	Playoff	(Japan) Haruo Yasuda
8	12 Sep 1976	Suntory Open	−15 (66-68-66-73=273)	3 strokes	(Japan) Isao Aoki
9	28 Nov 1976	Dunlop Phoenix Tournament	−16 (66-69-65-72=272)	6 strokes	(United States) Miller Barber
10	1 May 1977	Chunichi Crowns	E (71-73-70-66=280)	4 strokes	(Japan) Kenji Mori
11	2 Sep 1979	ANA Sapporo Open	−4 (71-73-68-72=284)	2 strokes	(Japan) Kikuo Arai
12	3 May 1981	Chunichi Crowns (2)	−3 (73-72-65-67=277)	2 strokes	(United States) D. A. Weibring
13	21 Jun 1981	Pepsi-Wilson Tournament (2)	−18 (70-68-66-66=270)	1 stroke	(Japan) Yutaka Hagawa
14	30 May 1982	Mitsubishi Galant Tournament (2)	−13 (66-69-69-67=271)	Playoff	(Japan) Teruo Sugihara
15	19 Jun 1983	Yomiuri Open	−12 (72-71-67-70=280)	Playoff	(Japan) Tōru Nakamura
16	6 Oct 1985	Tokai Classic	−10 (70-71-68-69=278)	1 stroke	(Japan) Isao Aoki
17	14 Sep 1986	Suntory Open (2)	−13 (67-69-67-72=275)	Playoff	(Japan) Isao Aoki
18	15 Nov 1987	Visa Taiheiyo Club Masters	−12 (70-69-71-66=276)	1 stroke	(United States) Tom Watson
19	11 Jun 1989	Sapporo Tokyu Open (2)	−6 (71-65-76-70=282)	3 strokes	(Japan) Katsuji Hasegawa, (Japan) Tsuneyuki Nakajima
20	30 Sep 1990	Tokai Classic (2)	−10 (70-72-64=206)	2 strokes	(Japan) Saburo Fujiki, (Japan) Tadami Ueno

PGA of Japan Tour playoff record (5–5)

No.	Year	Tournament	Opponent(s)	Result
1	1973	World Friendship	(Japan) Isao Aoki, (Taiwan) Lu Liang-Huan	Lu won with birdie on first extra hole
2	1974	Pepsi-Wilson Tournament	(Taiwan) Hsieh Yung-yo	Won with birdie on fourth extra hole
3	1976	Pepsi-Wilson Tournament	(Australia) Brian Jones, (Japan) Shozo Miyamoto, (Australia) Peter Thomson	Thomson won with par on fourteenth extra hole Jones eliminated by par on fourth hole Miyamoto eliminated by par on first hole
4	1976	KBC Augusta	(Japan) Haruo Yasuda	Won with birdie on first extra hole
5	1978	Japan Open Golf Championship	(Spain) Seve Ballesteros	Lost to birdie on first extra hole
6	1982	Fujisankei Classic	(Japan) Tsuneyuki Nakajima	Lost to par on first extra hole
7	1982	Mitsubishi Galant Tournament	(Japan) Teruo Sugihara	Won with par on first extra hole
8	1983	Pocari-Sweat Hakuryuko Open	(Japan) Saburo Fujiki, (Japan) Shinsaku Maeda, (Japan) Hiroshi Makino	Makino won with birdie on second extra hole after three-hole aggregate playoff; Fujiki: −1 (3-4-4=11), Makino: −1 (3-4-4=11), Marsh: +1 (3-5-5=13), Maeda: +2 (4-5-5=14)
9	1983	Yomiuri Open	(Japan) Tōru Nakamura	Won with birdie on third extra hole
10	1986	Suntory Open	(Japan) Isao Aoki	Won with par on first extra hole

=== Other Japan wins (5) ===
- 1972 Dunlop Tournament
- 1973 Japan vs Australia Match individual
- 1975 Dunlop Wizard
- 1976 Dunlop Wizard
- 1977 Dunlop Wizard

=== Asia Golf Circuit wins (5) ===
No.	Date	Tournament	Winning score	Margin of victory	Runner(s)-up
1	21 Mar 1971	Indian Open	−17 (66-66-74-69=275)	1 stroke	(Australia) David Graham
2	25 Mar 1973	Indian Open (2)	−12 (71-73-68-68=280)	3 strokes	(Australia) Stewart Ginn
3	1 Apr 1973	Thailand Open	−2 (75-73-66-72=286)	2 strokes	(Philippines) Ben Arda, (Japan) Mitsutaka Kono
4	10 Mar 1974	Malaysian Open	−10 (69-70-69-70=278)	1 stroke	(United States) Wally Kuchar
5	9 Mar 1975	Malaysian Open (2)	−12 (66-69-71-70=276)	2 strokes	(Taiwan) Hsieh Min-Nan

Asia Golf Circuit playoff record (0–2)

No.	Year	Tournament	Opponent(s)	Result
1	1974	Hong Kong Open	(Taiwan) Lu Liang-Huan	Lost to birdie on third extra hole
2	1974	Indonesia Open	(Philippines) Ben Arda, (Taiwan) Hsu Chi-san	Arda won with par on sixth extra hole Hsu eliminated by par on first hole

=== Other Asian wins (1) ===
- 1976 Dunhill International Match-Play (Hong Kong)

=== PGA Tour of Australia wins (7) ===
No.	Date	Tournament	Winning score	Margin of victory	Runner(s)-up
1	9 Apr 1978	Western Australia PGA Championship	−8 (71-70-69-70=280)	7 strokes	(Australia) Graham Johnson
2	24 Jan 1982	Ford Dealers South Australian Open	−13 (71-67-67-70=275)	8 strokes	(Australia) Bill Dunk
3	21 Feb 1982	Australian Masters	−3 (71-72-71-75=289)	1 stroke	(Australia) Stewart Ginn
4	17 Oct 1982	Dunhill Queensland Open	−3 (73-69-70-73=285)	Playoff	(Australia) Wayne Grady
5	7 Nov 1982	Mayne Nickless Australian PGA Championship	−6 (71-69-70-72=282)	3 strokes	(Australia) John Clifford, (United States) Ben Crenshaw, (Australia) Bob Shearer
6	30 Oct 1983	Resch's Pilsner Tweed Classic	−12 (69-70-70-67=276)	1 stroke	(Australia) Terry Gale
7	11 Dec 1983	New Zealand PGA Championship	−11 (70-72-68-67=277)	2 strokes	(Australia) Vaughan Somers

PGA Tour of Australia playoff record (1–1)

No.	Year	Tournament	Opponent	Result
1	1976	Victorian Open	(England) Guy Wolstenholme	Lost to birdie on third extra hole
2	1982	Dunhill Queensland Open	(Australia) Wayne Grady	Won with par on first extra hole

=== Other Australian wins (6) ===
- 1966 Royal Fremantle Open (as an amateur)
- 1966 Nedlands Masters (as an amateur)
- 1967 Nedlands Masters (as an amateur)
- 1968 Western Australian Open
- 1969 Western Australia PGA Championship
- 1976 Western Australian Open

=== New Zealand Golf Circuit wins (2) ===
No.	Date	Tournament	Winning score	Margin of victory	Runner-up
1	19 Dec 1970	Wattie's Tournament	−18 (65-65-62-70=262)	3 strokes	(Australia) Kel Nagle
2	3 Jan 1971	Spalding Masters	−14 (67-67-66-66=266)	2 strokes	(England) Guy Wolstenholme

=== Champions Tour wins (6) ===
Legend
Champions Tour major championships (2)
Other Champions Tour (4)

No.	Date	Tournament	Winning score	Margin of victory	Runner(s)-up
1	4 Jun 1995	Bruno's Memorial Classic	−15 (68-63-70=201)	5 strokes	(United States) J. C. Snead
2	5 May 1996	PaineWebber Invitational	−10 (66-71-69=206)	1 stroke	(Scotland) Brian Barnes, (United States) Tom Wargo
3	1 Sep 1996	Franklin Quest Championship	−14 (70-65-67=202)	2 strokes	(United States) Kermit Zarley
4	22 Jun 1997	Nationwide Championship	−18 (67-68-70=205)	1 stroke	(United States) Hale Irwin
5	29 Jun 1997	U.S. Senior Open	−8 (72-67-67-74=280)	1 stroke	(South Africa) John Bland
6	4 Apr 1999	The Tradition	−8 (69-67=136)	3 strokes	(United States) Larry Nelson

Champions Tour playoff record (0–1)

No.	Year	Tournament	Opponent	Result
1	2004	MasterCard Classic	(United States) Ed Fiori	Lost to par on third extra hole

=== Other senior wins (4) ===
- 1997 Liberty Mutual Legends of Golf (with John Bland)
- 1998 Japan Senior Open
- 1999 Japan Senior Open
- 2010 Liberty Mutual Legends of Golf – Raphael Division (with John Bland)

== Results in major championships ==
Tournament	1970	1971	1972	1973	1974	1975	1976	1977	1978	1979
Masters Tournament					T31	T22	T9	T31		T28
U.S. Open								T35	CUT	T16
The Open Championship	T25	57	T50	T31	T44	6	T17	T15	CUT	T7
PGA Championship								T58	T7	T16

Tournament	1980	1981	1982	1983	1984	1985	1986	1987	1988	1989
Masters Tournament	T33									
U.S. Open										
The Open Championship	T45	T19	T25	4	T9	T20	T56	T11	T38	
PGA Championship										

Tournament	1990	1991	1992	1993	1994	1995	1996	1997	1998
Masters Tournament									
U.S. Open									CUT
The Open Championship		T44							
PGA Championship									

Top 10
Did not play

CUT = missed the half-way cut
"T" indicates a tie for a place

=== Summary ===
Tournament	Wins	2nd	3rd	Top-5	Top-10	Top-25	Events	Cuts made
Masters Tournament	0	0	0	0	1	2	6	6
U.S. Open	0	0	0	0	0	1	4	2
The Open Championship	0	0	0	1	4	11	20	19
PGA Championship	0	0	0	0	1	2	3	3
Totals	0	0	0	1	6	16	33	30

- Most consecutive cuts made – 16 (1978 PGA – 1991 Open Championship)
- Longest streak of top-10s – 2 (twice)

== Champions Tour major championships ==
=== Wins (2) ===
Year	Championship	Winning score	Margin	Runner-up
1997	U.S. Senior Open	E (72-67-67-74=280)	1 stroke	(South Africa) John Bland
1999	The Tradition	−8 (69-67=136)	3 strokes	(United States) Larry Nelson

== Team appearances ==
- Dunhill Cup (representing Australia): 1985 (winners)
- Four Tours World Championship (representing Australasia): 1985, 1986, 1987, 1988, 1991

== See also ==
- Fall 1976 PGA Tour Qualifying School graduates
- List of golfers with most Japan Golf Tour wins
- List of golfers with most European Tour wins
