= Yoshiyuki Isomura =

Japanese golfer

Personal information
- Nationality: Japan
- Born: 6 September 1955
- Died: 21 August 2009 (aged 53) Nagoya, Japan
- Height: 1.73 m (5 ft 8 in)
- Weight: 75 kg (165 lb; 11.8 st)

Career
- Sport: Golf
- Turned professional: 1979
- Former tour: Japan Golf Tour
- Professional wins: 2

Number of wins by tour
- Japan Golf Tour: 1
- Other: 1

Yoshiyuki Isomura (6 September 1955 - 21 August 2009) was a Japanese professional golfer.

== Career ==
Isomura played on the Japan Golf Tour, winning once.

== Professional wins (2) ==
=== PGA of Japan Tour wins (1) ===
| No. | Date | Tournament | Winning score | Margin of victory | Runners-up |
|---|---|---|---|---|---|
| 1 | 7 Sep 1986 | Kansai Open | −4 (69-72-69-74=284) | 3 strokes | (Japan) Yoshio Ichikawa, (Japan) Shinsaku Maeda, (Japan) Kazuo Yoshikawa |

PGA of Japan Tour playoff record (0–1)

| No. | Year | Tournament | Opponent | Result |
|---|---|---|---|---|
| 1 | 1987 | Pocari Sweat Open | (Japan) Kinpachi Yoshimura | Lost to par on first extra hole |

=== Japan Challenge Tour wins (1) ===
- 1993 Korakuen Cup (1st)

== Team appearances ==
- World Cup (representing Japan): 1989
