= Nihon Kokudo Keikaku Summers =

Professional golf tournament in Japan

Tournament information
- Location: Japan
- Established: 1977
- Tour: Japan Golf Tour
- Format: Stroke play
- Prize fund: ¥30,000,000
- Month played: August
- Final year: 1982

Tournament record score
- Aggregate: 275 Teruo Sugihara (1982)
- To par: −13 as above

Final champion
- (Japan) Teruo Sugihara

The Nihon Kokudo Keikaku Summers (Japanese: 日本国土計画サマーズ) was a professional golf tournament in Japan from 1977 to 1982. It was an event on the Japan Golf Tour from 1978.

== Tournament hosts ==
Year(s)	Host course	Location
1981–1982	Budo Country Club	Ichihara, Chiba
1980	New Tateshina Country Club	Chino, Nagano
1977–1979	Shirasagi Country Club	Utsunomiya, Tochigi

== Winners ==
Year	Winner	Score	To par	Margin of victory	Runner(s)-up	Ref.
1982	(Japan) Teruo Sugihara	275	−13			
1981	(Japan) Masahiro Kuramoto	280	−8	5 strokes	(Japan) Saburo Fujiki (Japan) Keiichi Hoshino	
1980	(Japan) Yasuhiro Funatogawa	206 (Note: Tournament reduced to 54 holes after fog and rain delays caused the first round to extend over two days; the weather also resulted in the course being shortened from a par 71 to par 67 for the final two rounds.)	+1	Playoff (Note: Funatogawa won with a par on the first hole of a sudden-death playoff.)	(Taiwan) Hsieh Min-Nan	
1979	(Japan) Norio Mikami	279	−9	3 strokes		
1978	(Japan) Yoshitaka Yamamoto	279	−9	3 strokes	(Taiwan) Hsieh Min-Nan	
1977	(Japan) Tsuneyuki Nakajima	209	−7	2 strokes	(Japan) Isao Aoki (Japan) Koichi Uehara	
