= Tōru Nakamura (golfer) =

Japanese golfer

Tōru Nakamura 中村 通
Personal information
- Nationality: Japan
- Born: 31 October 1950 (age 76) Osaka Prefecture, Japan
- Height: 1.68 m (5 ft 6 in)
- Weight: 63 kg (139 lb; 9.9 st)

Career
- Sport: Golf
- Turned professional: 1968
- Former tour: Japan Golf Tour
- Professional wins: 28

Number of wins by tour
- Japan Golf Tour: 20 (Tied 9th all time)
- Other: 8

Best results in major championships
- Masters Tournament: CUT: 1980
- PGA Championship: T59: 1980
- U.S. Open: DNP
- The Open Championship: T20: 1982

Tōru Nakamura (中村 通, Nakamura Tōru; born 31 October 1950) is a Japanese golfer.

== Career ==
Nakamura was born in Osaka. He won 20 tournaments on the Japan Golf Tour and ranks eighth on the career victories list.

== Professional wins (28) ==
=== PGA of Japan Tour wins (20) ===
| No. | Date | Tournament | Winning score | Margin of victory | Runner(s)-up |
|---|---|---|---|---|---|
| 1 | 2 Sep 1973 | Hiroshima Open | −19 (67-64-68-70=269) | 1 stroke | (Philippines) Iraneo Legaspi |
| 2 | 16 Jun 1974 | Sapporo Tokyu Open | −10 (71-67-71-69=278) | 2 strokes | (Australia) Graham Marsh |
| 3 | 25 Aug 1974 | KBC Augusta | −15 (67-65-70-71=273) | 1 stroke | (Japan) Teruo Sugihara |
| 4 | 24 Nov 1975 | ABC Japan vs USA Golf Matches | −15 (67-67-71-68=273) | 7 strokes | (United States) Al Geiberger |
| 5 | 7 May 1978 | Wizard Tournament | −2 (73-70-71=214) | 1 stroke | (Japan) Kikuo Arai, (Japan) Yoshitaka Yamamoto |
| 6 | 11 Jun 1978 | Mitsubishi Galant Tournament | −8 (72-68-69-71=280) | 1 stroke | (Taiwan) Hsu Sheng-san, (Japan) Norio Suzuki |
| 7 | 3 Jun 1979 | Mitsubishi Galant Tournament (2) | −3 (74-72-71-68=285) | 1 stroke | (Japan) Yoshio Kusayanagi |
| 8 | 10 Jun 1979 | Tohoku Classic | −10 (73-67-69-69=278) | Playoff | (Taiwan) Hsieh Min-Nan |
| 9 | 1 Jul 1979 | Kansai Pro Championship | −15 (69-66-68-70=273) | 4 strokes | (Japan) Yasuhiro Miyamoto, (Japan) Shigeru Uchida |
| 10 | 18 Apr 1982 | Bridgestone Aso Open | −5 (74-72-68-69=283) | 3 strokes | (Japan) Shigeru Uchida |
| 11 | 13 May 1984 | Japan PGA Match-Play Championship | 4 and 3 | | (Japan) Kouichi Inoue |
| 12 | 12 Aug 1984 | JPGA East-West Tournament | −10 (67-65=132) | | |
| 13 | 2 Sep 1984 | Kansai Open Golf Championship | −7 (70-75-67-69=281) | 2 strokes | (Japan) Yoshitaka Yamamoto |
| 14 | 2 Dec 1984 | Golf Nippon Series | −23 (66-66-67-68=267) | 7 strokes | (Japan) Masahiro Kuramoto |
| 15 | 9 Nov 1986 | Hiroshima Open (2) | −16 (68-68-71-65=272) | Playoff | (Japan) Saburo Fujiki |
| 16 | 7 Dec 1986 | Golf Nippon Series (2) | −15 (70-70-66-69=275) | 2 strokes | (Japan) Isao Aoki |
| 17 | 25 Sep 1988 | Gene Sarazen Jun Classic | −12 (68-68-69-35=240) (Note: Shortened to 63 holes due to weather.) | 4 strokes | (Japan) Nobuo Serizawa |
| 18 | 11 Mar 1990 | Imperial Open | −3 (69-72-73-71=285) | Playoff | (Japan) Hideto Shigenobu |
| 19 | 9 Sep 1990 | Suntory Open | −17 (65-65-69-72=271) | 1 stroke | (Australia) Graham Marsh |
| 20 | 28 Jun 1992 | Mizuno Open | −6 (70-72-72-68=282) | 1 stroke | (Japan) Saburo Fujiki, (Australia) Brian Jones |

PGA of Japan Tour playoff record (3–5)

| No. | Year | Tournament | Opponent(s) | Result |
|---|---|---|---|---|
| 1 | 1975 | Hiroshima Open | (Taiwan) Lu Liang-Huan, (Japan) Kosaku Shimada | Lu won two-hole aggregate playoff; Lu: E (3-4=7), Nakamura: +2 (5-4=9), Shimada: +2 (4-5=9) |
| 2 | 1979 | Tohoku Classic | (Taiwan) Hsieh Min-Nan | Won with birdie on second extra hole |
| 3 | 1981 | Mitsubishi Galant Tournament | (Taiwan) Lu Hsi-chuen, (Japan) Teruo Sugihara | Lu won with birdie on first extra hole |
| 4 | 1981 | Tokai Classic | (Japan) Fujio Kobayashi, (Japan) Masahiro Kuramoto, (Japan) Hideto Shigenobu | Kuramoto won with par on first extra hole |
| 5 | 1983 | Yomiuri Open | (Australia) Graham Marsh | Lost to birdie on third extra hole |
| 6 | 1986 | Hiroshima Open | (Japan) Saburo Fujiki | Won with par on fourth extra hole |
| 7 | 1990 | Imperial Open | (Japan) Hideto Shigenobu | Won with birdie on fourth extra hole |
| 8 | 1994 | Dydo Shizuoka Open | (Japan) Tsuneyuki Nakajima | Lost to par on first extra hole |

=== Other wins (8) ===
- 1973 Okinawa Classic
- 1975 Young Lions
- 1976 All Star
- 1977 All Star
- 1982 Kobe-Gifu Open, ???
- 1984 Kobe-Gifu Open
- 1989 Kuzuha International

== Team appearances ==
- World Cup (representing Japan): 1973
- Four Tours World Championship (representing Japan): 1987, 1989

== See also ==
- List of golfers with most Japan Golf Tour wins
