= Teruo Nakamura (golfer) =

Japanese professional golfer (born 1952)

Personal information
- Nationality: Japan
- Born: 19 February 1952 (age 74) Tokyo, Japan
- Height: 1.79 m (5 ft 10 in)
- Weight: 67 kg (148 lb; 10.6 st)

Career
- Sport: Golf
- Status: Professional
- Former tour: Japan Golf Tour
- Professional wins: 3

Number of wins by tour
- Japan Golf Tour: 3

Teruo Nakamura (born 19 February 1952) is a Japanese professional golfer.

== Career ==
Nakamura played on the Japan Golf Tour, winning three times.

== Professional wins (3) ==
=== PGA of Japan Tour wins (3) ===
| No. | Date | Tournament | Winning score | Margin of victory | Runner(s)-up |
|---|---|---|---|---|---|
| 1 | 4 Sep 1983 | Chubu Open | −9 (73-63-70-73=279) | Playoff | (Japan) Teruo Suzumura |
| 2 | 4 Sep 1988 | Chubu Open (2) | −9 (66-72-69-72=279) | 7 strokes | (Japan) Masahiro Shiota, (Japan) Akimitsu Tokita |
| 3 | 8 Sep 1991 | Chubu Open (3) | −9 (73-69-68-69=279) | 7 strokes | (Japan) Jun Hattori, (Japan) Takeru Shibata |
