= Imperial Tournament =

Imperial Open
Tournament information
- Location: Yokoshibahikari, Chiba, Japan
- Established: 1987
- Course: Caledonian Golf Club
- Par: 71
- Length: 6,681 yards (6,109 m)
- Tour: Japan Golf Tour
- Format: Stroke play
- Prize fund: ¥100,000,000
- Month played: March
- Final year: 1993

Tournament record score
- Aggregate: 280 Naomichi Ozaki (1992)
- To par: −8 as above

Final champion
- (Japan) Nobuo Serizawa
- Location in Japan Location in the Chiba Prefecture

The Imperial Tournament was a professional golf tournament that was held in Japan from 1987 to 1993. It was an event on the Japan Golf Tour from 1990. It was played at the Seve Ballesteros Golf Club near Inashiki in Ibaraki Prefecture until 1992 and at the Caledonian Golf Club near Yokoshibahikari in Chiba Prefecture in 1993.

== Winners ==
Year	Tour (Note: JPN − PGA of Japan Tour.)	Winner	Score	To par	Margin of victory	Runner(s)-up	Ref.
Imperial Open
1993	JPN	(Japan) Nobuo Serizawa	212	−1	1 stroke	(Australia) Brian Jones	
1992	JPN	(Japan) Naomichi Ozaki (2)	280	−8	3 strokes	(Japan) Seiki Okuda	
1991	JPN	(Japan) Yutaka Hagawa	282	−6	1 stroke	(Japan) Naomichi Ozaki	
1990	JPN	(Japan) Tōru Nakamura	285	−3	Playoff	(Japan) Hideto Shigenobu	
Imperial Tournament
1989		(Japan) Naomichi Ozaki					
1988		(Japan) Katsuji Hasegawa	143	−1	Playoff	(Japan) Shigeru Kawamata (Japan) Naomichi Ozaki (Japan) Taiijiro Tanaka	
1987: No information known
