= Okinawa Classic =

The Okinawa Classic was a men's professional golf tournament that was held at Daikyo Country Club in Itoman, Okinawa, Japan from 1973 until 1975.

== Winners ==
Year	Winner	Score	To par	Margin of victory	Runner(s)-up	Ref
Okinawa Classic
1975	(Japan) Seiichi Numazawa	282	−6	3 strokes	(Taiwan) Hsieh Yung-yo (Japan) Shigeru Uchida	
Okinawa TV Cup
1974	(Taiwan) Hsieh Min-Nan	273	−15	6 strokes	(Taiwan) Hsieh Yung-yo	
Okinawa Classic
1973	(Japan) Tōru Nakamura					
