= Masahiro Kuramoto =

Japanese professional golfer

Masahiro Kuramoto 倉本昌弘
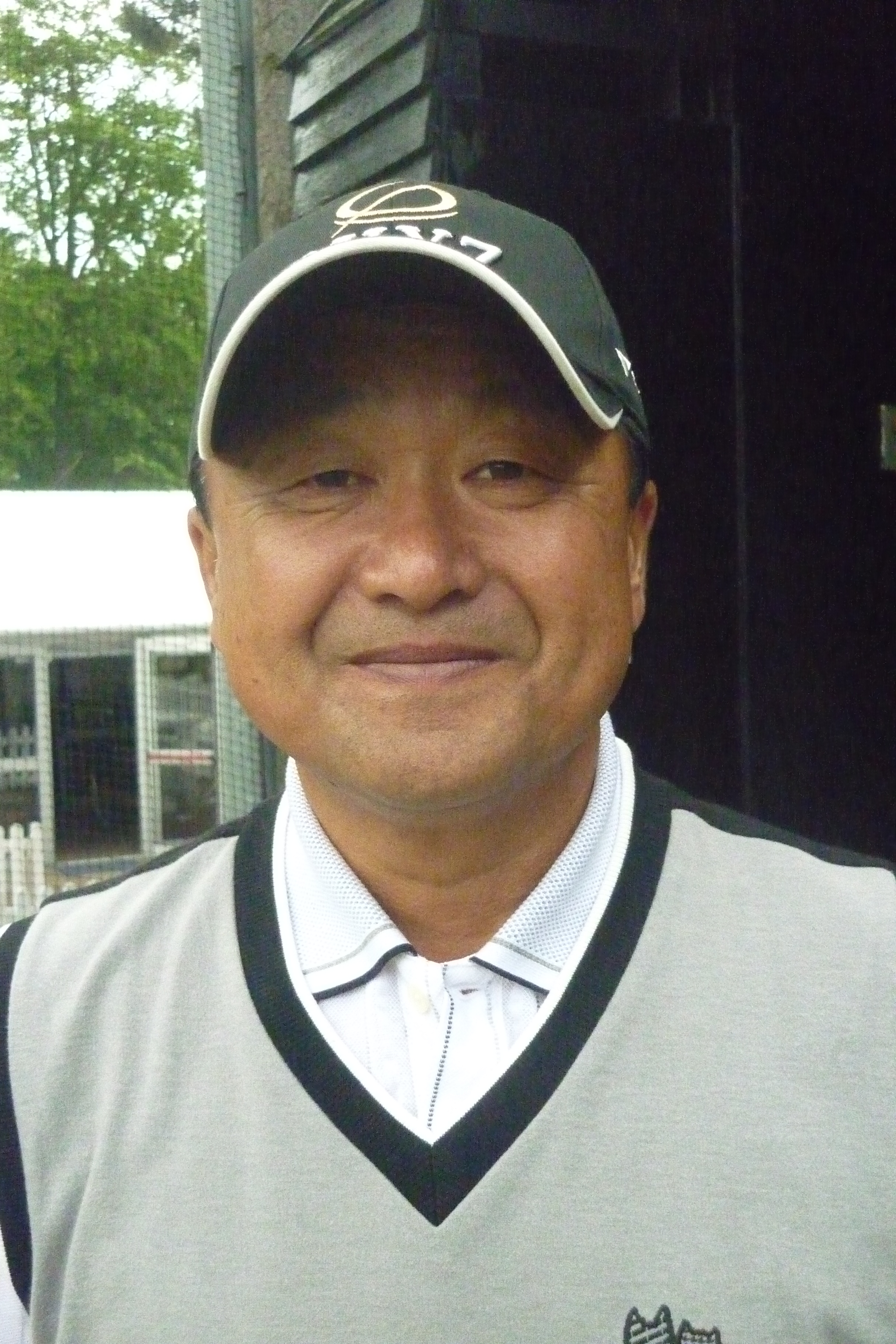

Personal information
- Nickname: Massy
- Nationality: Japan
- Born: 9 September 1955 (age 71) Hiroshima Prefecture, Japan
- Height: 1.64 m (5 ft 5 in)
- Weight: 66 kg (146 lb; 10.4 st)

Career
- Sport: Golf
- Turned professional: 1981
- Current tours: European Senior Tour; Japan PGA Senior Tour
- Former tours: Japan Golf Tour; PGA Tour; Champions Tour
- Professional wins: 47

Number of wins by tour
- Japan Golf Tour: 30 (6th all time)
- European Senior Tour: 2
- Other: 15

Best results in major championships
- Masters Tournament: DNP
- PGA Championship: T42: 1982
- U.S. Open: CUT: 1993, 1994
- The Open Championship: T4: 1982

Masahiro "Massy" Kuramoto (倉本昌弘, Kuramoto Masahiro; born 9 September 1955) is a Japanese professional golfer.

== Career ==
In 1955, Kuramoto was born in Hiroshima Prefecture. In 1981, he turned professional.

Kuramoto won 30 tournaments on the Japan Golf Tour, ranking sixth on the career list. He ranks 13th on the career money list with earnings of just over 1 billion ¥.

Kuramoto was medalist at the 1992 PGA Tour qualifying school and had full playing rights on the tour in 1993. He played 65 times on the PGA Tour from 1978 to 1997. His best finish was tied for fourth place at the 1982 Open Championship, which was also his best finish in a major championship.

In 2005, Kuramoto turned 50 and was eligible to play on the Champions Tour. He qualified at the 2005 Champions Tour qualifying school. He made his first start at the Turtle Bay Championship in January 2006. His best finish on the Champions Tour was a fourth-place finish in the 2006 Wal-Mart First Tee Open at Pebble Beach. He also won two European Senior Tour events in 2010 and 2012.

== Amateur wins ==
- 1975 Japan Amateur Championship
- 1977 Japan Amateur Championship
- 1980 Japan Amateur Championship

== Professional wins (47) ==
=== Japan Golf Tour wins (30) ===
No.	Date	Tournament	Winning score	Margin of victory	Runner(s)-up
1	28 Sep 1980	Chushikoku Open (as an amateur)	−7 (69-70-68-74=281)	4 strokes	(Japan) Kenji Sogame
2	16 Aug 1981	Nihon Kokudo Keikaku Summers	−8 (65-72-72-71=280)	5 strokes	(Japan) Saburo Fujiki, (Japan) Keiichi Hoshino
3	5 Sep 1981	Chushikoku Open (2)	−3 (70-76-67=213)	5 strokes	(Japan) Hideto Shigenobu
4	20 Sep 1981	ANA Sapporo Open	−6 (67-73-69-73=282)	3 strokes	(Japan) Kikuo Arai
5	11 Oct 1981	Tokai Classic	−7 (68-71-70=209)*	Playoff	(Japan) Fujio Kobayashi, (Japan) Tōru Nakamura, (Japan) Hideto Shigenobu
6	25 Jul 1982	Japan PGA Championship	−14 (67-69-69-69=274)	4 strokes	(Taiwan) Hsieh Min-Nan
7	4 Sep 1982	Chushikoku Open (3)	−10 (67-70-73-68=278)	4 strokes	(Japan) Norio Mikami
8	3 Sep 1983	Chushikoku Open (4)	−16 (70-66-70-66=272)	5 strokes	(Japan) Hideto Shigenobu
9	9 Oct 1983	Tokai Classic (2)	−12 (64-69-72-71=276)	2 strokes	(Japan) Naomichi Ozaki
10	2 Sep 1984	Chushikoku Open (5)	+5 (68-73-72-76=289)	Playoff	(Japan) Hideto Shigenobu
11	21 Oct 1984	Bridgestone Tournament	−9 (67-74-67-71=279)	Playoff	(Taiwan) Chen Tze-chung, (Japan) Yoshihisa Iwashita, (Scotland) Sam Torrance
12	29 Sep 1985	Gene Sarazen Jun Classic	−7 (66-72-71=209)*	Shared title with (Japan) Kazushige Kono and (United States) Payne Stewart	
13	27 Oct 1985	Bridgestone Open (2)	−15 (71-67-68-67=273)	1 stroke	(Japan) Isao Aoki
14	21 Sep 1986	ANA Open (2)	−7 (73-72-66-70=281)	2 strokes	(Japan) Isao Aoki
15	5 Oct 1986	Tokai Classic (3)	−17 (68-69-65-69=271)	9 strokes	(Japan) Shinsaku Maeda
16	23 Aug 1987	Maruman Open	−24 (64-62-67-71=264)	4 strokes	(Japan) Masashi Ozaki
17	6 Sep 1987	Chushikoku Open (6)	−8 (71-70-70-69=280)	5 strokes	(Japan) Tadami Ueno
18	5 Jun 1988	Sendai Classic	−9 (67-67-70=204)*	2 strokes	(Japan) Futoshi Irino
19	19 Jun 1988	Yomiuri Sapporo Beer Open	−11 (68-66-74-69=277)	4 strokes	(Australia) Ian Baker-Finch, (Japan) Tsukasa Watanabe, (Japan) Yoshikazu Yokoshima
20	3 Jul 1988	Kansai Pro Championship	−12 (71-69-68-68=276)	1 stroke	(Japan) Yurio Akitomi, (Japan) Norio Mikami
21	28 Aug 1988	KBC Augusta	−12 (67-71-65-73=276)	2 strokes	(Japan) Hajime Meshiai, (Japan) Masashi Ozaki, (Japan) Nobumitsu Yuhara
22	4 Sep 1988	Chushikoku Open (7)	−22 (67-63-65-71=266)	13 strokes	(Japan) Tadami Ueno
23	25 Mar 1990	Seto Uthumi Open	+7 (75-67-78-75=295)	1 stroke	(Japan) Ryoken Kawagishi, (Japan) Noboru Sugai
24	10 Nov 1991	Acom International	32 pts (7-7-18=32)*	10 points	(Canada) Brent Franklin, (Japan) Tōru Nakamura, (Japan) Yoshi Mizumaki
25	17 May 1992	Japan PGA Championship (2)	−7 (68-71-71-71=281)	Playoff	(Japan) Tsuneyuki Nakajima
26	25 Oct 1992	Bridgestone Open (3)	−17 (68-67-70-66=271)	Playoff	(Japan) Tetsu Nishikawa
27	13 Dec 1992	Daikyo Open	−13 (66-73-67-65=271)	4 strokes	(United States) David Ishii
28	5 Jun 1994	JCB Classic Sendai (2)	−13 (71-65-67-68=271)	2 strokes	(Australia) Roger Mackay, (Japan) Toshiaki Sudo
29	10 Sep 1995	Suntory Open	−15 (67-64-71-71=273)	3 strokes	(Japan) Takaaki Fukuzawa, (Japan) Satoshi Higashi, (Japan) Nobuo Serizawa
30	28 Sep 2003	Acom International (2)	−13 (59-69-70-73=271)	Playoff	(Japan) Katsumasa Miyamoto, (Japan) Masashi Ozaki

*Note: Tournament shortened to 54 holes due to rain.

Japan Golf Tour playoff record (6–4)

No.	Year	Tournament	Opponent(s)	Result
1	1981	Tokai Classic	(Japan) Fujio Kobayashi, (Japan) Tōru Nakamura, (Japan) Hideto Shigenobu	Won with par on first extra hole
2	1983	Gene Sarazen Jun Classic	(Japan) Masashi Ozaki	Lost to par on first extra hole
3	1984	Chushikoku Open	(Japan) Hideto Shigenobu	
4	1984	Bridgestone Tournament	(Taiwan) Chen Tze-chung, (Japan) Yoshihisa Iwashita, (Scotland) Sam Torrance	Won with eagle on first extra hole
5	1985	Bridgestone Aso Open	(Taiwan) Hsieh Min-Nan	
6	1991	Sapporo Tokyu Open	(Canada) Rick Gibson, (Japan) Shinsaku Maeda	Gibson won with birdie on first extra hole
7	1992	Japan PGA Championship	(Japan) Tsuneyuki Nakajima	Won with par on second extra hole
8	1992	Nikkei Cup	(Japan) Kiyoshi Murota	Lost to birdie on first extra hole
9	1992	Bridgestone Open	(Japan) Tetsu Nishikawa	Won with birdie on second extra hole
10	2003	Acom International	(Japan) Katsumasa Miyamoto, (Japan) Masashi Ozaki	Won with birdie on first extra hole

=== Other wins (5) ===
- 1981 Wakayama Open, Hyogo Open
- 1983 House Foods Kyosen Invitation
- 1985 KSB Setonaikai Open
- 2014 Legend Charity Pro-Am

=== European Senior Tour wins (2) ===
No.	Date	Tournament	Winning score	Margin of victory	Runner(s)-up
1	28 Nov 2010 (2011 season)	Handa Cup Senior Masters^{1}	−17 (69-71-66-65=271)	4 strokes	(Japan) Satoshi Higashi, (Philippines) Frankie Miñoza, (Japan) Kiyoshi Murota
2	24 Jun 2012	Van Lanschot Senior Open	E (75-72-69=216)	2 strokes	(Scotland) Andrew Oldcorn

^{1}Co-sanctioned by the Japan PGA Senior Tour

=== Japan PGA Senior Tour wins (10) ===
- 2007 Big Raisac Senior Open
- 2010 Japan Senior Open, Handa Cup Senior Masters
- 2014 Japan Senior Open, Iwasaki Shiratsuyu Senior Tournament
- 2015 Kyoshinkai Hiroshima Senior Championship
- 2016 Uniden Grand Senior Championship, Iwasaki Shiratsuyu Senior Tournament
- 2018 Uniden Grand Senior Championship
- 2019 Starts Senior Golf Tournament

== Results in major championships ==
Tournament	1978	1979	1980	1981	1982	1983	1984	1985	1986	1987	1988	1989	1990	1991	1992	1993	1994	1995
U.S. Open																CUT	CUT	
The Open Championship	CUT				T4	T45	CUT		T30	CUT				CUT				
PGA Championship					T42				CUT									CUT

Note: Kuramoto never played in the Masters Tournament.

Top 10
Did not play

CUT = missed the half-way cut (3rd round cut in 1984 Open Championship)
"T" = tied

== Team appearances ==
This list may be incomplete.

Amateur

- Eisenhower Trophy (representing Japan): 1976

Professional

- Dunhill Cup (representing Japan): 1985, 1992
- Four Tours World Championship (representing Japan): 1988, 1990
- Royal Trophy (Asian team): 2006 (non-playing captain)

== See also ==
- 1992 PGA Tour Qualifying School graduates
- List of golfers with most Japan Golf Tour wins
- Lowest rounds of golf
