= Katsuji Hasegawa =

Japanese golfer

Personal information
- Nationality: Japan
- Born: 3 May 1946 (age 80) Chiba Prefecture, Japan
- Height: 1.68 m (5 ft 6 in)
- Weight: 73 kg (161 lb; 11.5 st)

Career
- Sport: Golf
- Status: Professional
- Former tour: Japan Golf Tour
- Professional wins: 9

Number of wins by tour
- Japan Golf Tour: 2
- Other: 7

Katsuji Hasegawa (born 3 May 1946) is a Japanese professional golfer.

== Career ==
Hasegawa played on the Japan Golf Tour, winning twice.

== Professional wins (9) ==
=== PGA of Japan Tour wins (2) ===
| No. | Date | Tournament | Winning score | Margin of victory | Runner-up |
|---|---|---|---|---|---|
| 1 | 30 Mar 1980 | Shizuoka Open | −5 (71-74-65-73=283) | 1 stroke | (Japan) Shinsaku Maeda |
| 2 | 20 Jun 1993 | Yomiuri Sapporo Beer Open | −13 (65-70-68=203) (Note: Shortened to 54 holes due to weather.) | Playoff | (Japan) Hajime Meshiai |

PGA of Japan Tour playoff record (1–2)

| No. | Year | Tournament | Opponent(s) | Result |
|---|---|---|---|---|
| 1 | 1978 | Gene Sarazen Jun Classic | (Japan) Shoji Kikuchi, (Japan) Kesahiko Uchida | Uchida won with birdie on fourth extra hole Hasegawa eliminated by par on second hole |
| 2 | 1984 | Bridgestone Aso Open | (Japan) Hideto Shigenobu, (Japan) Akira Yabe | |
| 3 | 1993 | Yomiuri Sapporo Beer Open | (Japan) Hajime Meshiai | Won with birdie on first extra hole |

=== Other wins (4) ===
- 1979 Chiba Open
- 1985 Chiba Open
- 1988 Imperial Open
- 1989 Ibaraki Open

=== Senior wins (3) ===
- 1997 Japan Media System Cup Old Masters Tournament
- 2014 Kanto Pro Gold Senior Championship
- 2015 Kanto Pro Gold Senior Championship
