= 1987 PGA of Japan Tour =

Golf tour season

1987 PGA of Japan Tour season
- Duration: 19 March 1987 – 13 December 1987
- Number of official events: 40
- Most wins: (United States) David Ishii (6)
- Money list: (United States) David Ishii

The 1987 PGA of Japan Tour was the 15th season of the PGA of Japan Tour, the main professional golf tour in Japan since it was formed in 1973.

== Schedule ==
The following table lists official events during the 1987 season.

Date	Tournament	Location	Purse (¥)	Winner (Note: The number in brackets after each winner's name is the number of PGA of Japan Tour events they had won up to and including that tournament. This information is only shown for PGA of Japan Tour members.)	OWGR points	Other tours (Note: AGC − Asia Golf Circuit.)	Notes
22 Mar	Shizuoka Open	Shizuoka	35,000,000	(Taiwan) Lu Liang-Huan (8)	10		
12 Apr	Pocari Sweat Open	Hiroshima	40,000,000	(Japan) Kinpachi Yoshimura (3)	10		
19 Apr	Bridgestone Aso Open	Kumamoto	35,000,000	(Japan) Norio Mikami (2)	10		
26 Apr	Dunlop International Open	Ibaraki	50,000,000	(Japan) Isao Aoki (42)	24	AGC	
3 May	The Crowns	Ibaraki	90,000,000	(Japan) Masashi Ozaki (32)	42		
10 May	Fujisankei Classic	Shizuoka	60,000,000	(Japan) Masashi Ozaki (33)	22		
17 May	Japan PGA Match-Play Championship Unisys Cup	Ibaraki	40,000,000	(Japan) Katsunari Takahashi (7)	22		
24 May	Pepsi Ube Open	Yamaguchi	45,000,000	(Taiwan) Chen Tze-ming (5)	20		
31 May	Mitsubishi Galant Tournament	Hyōgo	56,000,000	(Australia) Brian Jones (5)	22		
7 Jun	Tohoku Classic	Miyagi	42,000,000	(Japan) Seiichi Kanai (10)	16		
14 Jun	Sapporo Tokyu Open	Hokkaidō	40,000,000	(United States) David Ishii (4)	18		
21 Jun	Yomiuri Sapporo Beer Open	Hyōgo	50,000,000	(Japan) Satoshi Higashi (1)	16		
28 Jun	Mizuno Open	Ishikawa	50,000,000	(United States) David Ishii (5)	20		
5 Jul	Kanto Pro Championship	Gunma	30,000,000	(Japan) Naomichi Ozaki (6)	6		
5 Jul	Kansai Pro Championship	Kōchi	25,000,000	(Japan) Yoshitaka Yamamoto (11)	4		
12 Jul	Hiroshima Open	Hiroshima	40,000,000	(Japan) Hajime Meshiai (3)	10		
26 Jul	Japan PGA Championship	Chiba	60,000,000	(United States) David Ishii (6)	36		
2 Aug	NST Niigata Open	Niigata	40,000,000	(Japan) Tadao Nakamura (1)	10		
16 Aug	Nikkei Cup	Gifu	40,000,000	(Japan) Nobuo Serizawa (1)	10		
23 Aug	Maruman Open	Saitama	60,000,000	(Japan) Masahiro Kuramoto (16)	10		
30 Aug	KBC Augusta	Fukuoka	50,000,000	(Japan) Saburo Fujiki (7)	18		
6 Sep	Kyusyu Open	Fukuoka	15,000,000	(Japan) Katsuyoshi Tomori (1)	4		
6 Sep	Kansai Open	Hyōgo	20,000,000	(Japan) Masanobu Kimura (1)	4		
6 Sep	Kanto Open	Chiba	30,000,000	(Japan) Yoshikazu Yokoshima (3)	10		
6 Sep	Chushikoku Open	Okayama	15,000,000	(Japan) Masahiro Kuramoto (17)	4		
6 Sep	Chubu Open	Gifu	15,000,000	(Japan) Eitaro Deguchi (5)	4		
6 Sep	Hokkaido Open	Hokkaidō	10,000,000	(Japan) Akihiko Kojima (1)	4		
13 Sep	Suntory Open	Chiba	60,000,000	(Japan) Noboru Sugai (1)	20		
20 Sep	ANA Open	Hokkaidō	50,000,000	(Japan) Isao Aoki (43)	18		
27 Sep	Gene Sarazen Jun Classic	Tochigi	56,000,000	(Japan) Masashi Ozaki (34)	14		
4 Oct	Tokai Classic	Aichi	60,000,000	(Japan) Tsuneyuki Nakajima (31)	22		
11 Oct	Japan Open Golf Championship	Hyōgo	60,000,000	(Japan) Isao Aoki (44)	36		
18 Oct	Polaroid Cup Golf Digest Tournament	Shizuoka	60,000,000	(Australia) Ian Baker-Finch (1)	20		
25 Oct	Bridgestone Open	Chiba	80,000,000	(United States) David Ishii (7)	38		
1 Nov	ABC Japan-U.S. Match	Hyōgo	65,000,000	(United States) Andy Bean (n/a)	n/a		
15 Nov	Visa Taiheiyo Club Masters	Shizuoka	90,000,000	(Australia) Graham Marsh (18)	44		
22 Nov	Dunlop Phoenix Tournament	Miyazaki	140,000,000	(United States) Craig Stadler (n/a)	46		
29 Nov	Casio World Open	Kagoshima	90,000,000	(United States) David Ishii (8)	42		
6 Dec	Golf Nippon Series	Tokyo	30,000,000	(Japan) Isao Aoki (45) (United States) David Ishii (9)	20		Title shared (Note: Tournament shortened to 36 holes due to snow; with the final round being cancelled Aoki and Ishii were declared joint winners.)
13 Dec	Daikyo Open	Okinawa	70,000,000	(Japan) Isamu Sugita (1)	12		

== Money list ==
The money list was based on prize money won during the season, calculated in Japanese yen.

Position	Player	Prize money (¥)
1	(United States) David Ishii	86,554,421
2	(Japan) Masashi Ozaki	76,981,199
3	(Japan) Hajime Meshiai	49,854,133
4	(Japan) Masahiro Kuramoto	49,171,300
5	(Japan) Isao Aoki	47,939,450

== Japan Challenge Tour ==
1987 Japan Challenge Tour season
- Duration: 3 June 1987 – 1 October 1987
- Number of official events: 3

The 1987 Japan Challenge Tour was the third season of the Japan Challenge Tour, the official development tour to the PGA of Japan Tour.

=== Schedule ===
The following table lists official events during the 1987 season.

Date	Tournament	Location	Purse (¥)	Winner (Note: The number in brackets after each winner's name is the number of Japan Challenge Tour events they had won up to and including that tournament. It is rare for someone to accumulate many wins on the Japan Challenge Tour as success at this level usually leads to promotion to the PGA of Japan Tour.)
4 Jun	Mito Green Open	Ibaraki	13,000,000	(Japan) Hiroshi Gohda (1)
30 Jul	Kanto Kokusai Open	Tochigi	12,000,000	(Japan) Minoru Kawakami (1)
1 Oct	Sports Shinko Open	Osaka	13,000,000	(Japan) Toshimitsu Kai (1)
