= Kaoru Nakamaru =

Japanese journalist and writer

Kaoru Nakamaru (中丸 薫, Nakamaru Kaoru; born 23 May 1937) is a Japanese journalist, television interviewer, and author with a background in international politics.

== Career ==
Born in Yamanashi Prefecture, Nakamaru studied abroad at Columbia University. While beginning to write articles and books on international relations, she hosted a number of nationally broadcast television interview series, including Sekai no Shuyaku (世界の主役) in 1972. The magazine Newsweek nicknamed her "the Edward R. Murrow of Japan" in a 1974 profile that introduced her alongside Makiko Tanaka as one of a "handful of Japanese women who have bucked their country's patriarchal system". The profile itself was news in Japan. During her career, she has interviewed such world figures as Saddam Hussein, Edward M. Kennedy, the Shah of Iran Mohammad Reza Pahlavi, and Idi Amin.

== Family ==
Nakamaru asserts that she is the granddaughter of the Emperor Meiji. These claims have been disputed in a Korean newspaper article.

Nakamaru was married to the film and television actor Tadao Nakamaru, who died on 23 April 2009.
