= 1984 PGA of Japan Tour =

Golf tour season

1984 PGA of Japan Tour season
- Duration: 15 March 1984 – 9 December 1984
- Number of official events: 39
- Most wins: (Japan) Tōru Nakamura (4)
- Money list: (Japan) Shinsaku Maeda

The 1984 PGA of Japan Tour was the 12th season of the PGA of Japan Tour, the main professional golf tour in Japan since it was formed in 1973.

== Schedule ==
The following table lists official events during the 1984 season.

| Date | Tournament | Location | Purse (¥) | Winner (Note: The number in brackets after each winner's name is the number of PGA of Japan Tour events they had won up to and including that tournament. This information is only shown for PGA of Japan Tour members.) | Other tours (Note: AGC − Asia Golf Circuit.) | Notes |
|---|---|---|---|---|---|---|
| 18 Mar | Shizuoka Open | Shizuoka | 30,000,000 | (Japan) Naomichi Ozaki (1) | | |
| 8 Apr | Hakuryuko Pocari Sweat Open | Hiroshima | 35,000,000 | (Japan) Tateo Ozaki (1) | | |
| 15 Apr | Bridgestone Aso Open | Kumamoto | 30,000,000 | (Japan) Hideto Shigenobu (4) | | |
| 22 Apr | Dunlop International Open | Ibaraki | US$200,000 | (United States) John Jacobs (n/a) | AGC | |
| 29 Apr | Chunichi Crowns | Aichi | 80,000,000 | (United States) Scott Simpson (n/a) | | |
| 6 May | Fujisankei Classic | Shizuoka | 45,000,000 | (Japan) Tateo Ozaki (2) | | |
| 13 May | Japan PGA Match-Play Championship | Ibaraki | 32,000,000 | (Japan) Tōru Nakamura (11) | | |
| 20 May | Pepsi Ube Open | Yamaguchi | 40,000,000 | (Japan) Yasuhiro Funatogawa (3) | | |
| 27 May | Mitsubishi Galant Tournament | Ishikawa | 50,000,000 | (Japan) Haruo Yasuda (6) | | |
| 3 Jun | Tohoku Classic | Miyagi | 35,000,000 | (Japan) Kouichi Inoue (2) | | |
| 10 Jun | Sapporo Tokyu Open | Hokkaidō | 35,000,000 | (Japan) Naomichi Ozaki (2) | | |
| 17 Jun | Yomiuri Open | Hyōgo | 40,000,000 | (Japan) Saburo Fujiki (5) | | |
| 24 Jun | Mizuno Tournament | Ishikawa | 35,000,000 | (Japan) Kikuo Arai (6) | | |
| 1 Jul | Kansai Pro Championship | Hyōgo | 15,000,000 | (Japan) Teruo Sugihara (21) | | |
| 1 Jul | Kanto Pro Championship | Chiba | 25,000,000 | (Japan) Pete Izumikawa (2) | | |
| 29 Jul | NST Niigata Open | Niigata | 32,000,000 | (Japan) Saburo Fujiki (6) | | |
| 5 Aug | Japan PGA Championship | Shizuoka | 35,000,000 | (Japan) Tsuneyuki Nakajima (17) | | |
| 12 Aug | JPGA East-West Tournament | Gunma | 18,000,000 | (Japan) Tōru Nakamura (12) | | |
| 26 Aug | KBC Augusta | Fukuoka | 40,000,000 | (Japan) Naomichi Ozaki (3) | | |
| 2 Sep | Kyusyu Open | Kumamoto | 12,000,000 | (Japan) Toshiya Shibutani (1) | | |
| 2 Sep | Kanto Open | Ibaraki | 30,000,000 | (Japan) Tsuneyuki Nakajima (18) | | |
| 2 Sep | Kansai Open Golf Championship | Shiga | 20,000,000 | (Japan) Tōru Nakamura (13) | | |
| 2 Sep | Chubu Open | Aichi | 12,000,000 | (Japan) Teruo Suzumura (1) | | |
| 2 Sep | Chushikoku Open | Yamaguchi | 10,000,000 | (Japan) Masahiro Kuramoto (10) | | |
| 2 Sep | Hokkaido Open | Hokkaidō | 7,000,000 | (Japan) Koichi Uehara (6) | | |
| 9 Sep | Suntory Open | Chiba | 60,000,000 | (Japan) Takashi Kurihara (5) | | |
| 16 Sep | ANA Sapporo Open | Hokkaidō | 40,000,000 | (Japan) Pete Izumikawa (3) | | |
| 23 Sep | Gene Sarazen Jun Classic | Tochigi | 50,000,000 | (Japan) Shinsaku Maeda (4) | | |
| 30 Sep | Tokai Classic | Aichi | 40,000,000 | (Japan) Yoshihisa Iwashita (1) | | |
| 7 Oct | Japan Open Golf Championship | Saitama | 60,000,000 | (Japan) Koichi Uehara (7) | | |
| 14 Oct | Golf Digest Tournament | Shizuoka | 40,000,000 | (Japan) Shinsaku Maeda (5) | | |
| 21 Oct | Bridgestone Tournament | Chiba | 70,000,000 | (Japan) Masahiro Kuramoto (11) | | |
| 28 Oct | Hiroshima Open | Hiroshima | 30,000,000 | (Japan) Masashi Ozaki (27) | | |
| 4 Nov | Uchida Yoko Cup Japan vs USA Match | Chiba | US$500,000 | (United States) Tom Watson (n/a) | | |
| 11 Nov | Taiheiyo Club Masters | Shizuoka | US$300,000 | (Japan) Shinsaku Maeda (9) | | |
| 18 Nov | Dunlop Phoenix Tournament | Miyazaki | 100,000,000 | (United States) Scott Simpson (n/a) | | |
| 25 Nov | Casio World Open | Kagoshima | 75,000,000 | (Scotland) Sandy Lyle (n/a) | | |
| 2 Dec | Golf Nippon Series | Tokyo | 20,000,000 | (Japan) Tōru Nakamura (14) | | |
| 9 Dec | Daikyo Open | Okinawa | 35,000,000 | (Japan) Hiroshi Ishii (7) | | |

== Money list ==
The money list was based on prize money won during the season, calculated in Japanese yen.

| Position | Player | Prize money (¥) |
|---|---|---|
| 1 | (Japan) Shinsaku Maeda | 57,040,357 |
| 2 | (Japan) Naomichi Ozaki | 53,717,214 |
| 3 | (Japan) Tateo Ozaki | 43,846,788 |
| 4 | (Japan) Kikuo Arai | 42,449,869 |
| 5 | (Japan) Tōru Nakamura | 41,543,634 |
