= Hiroo Kawai =

Japanese professional golfer

Hiroo Kawai 河井博大
Personal information
- Nationality: Japan
- Born: 13 November 1971 (age 54) Hiroshima Prefecture, Japan
- Height: 1.81 m (5 ft 11 in)
- Weight: 70 kg (150 lb; 11 st)

Career
- Sport: Golf
- Turned professional: 1996
- Current tour: Japan Golf Tour
- Professional wins: 1

Number of wins by tour
- Japan Golf Tour: 1

Best results in major championships
- Masters Tournament: DNP
- PGA Championship: DNP
- U.S. Open: DNP
- The Open Championship: CUT: 2011

Hiroo Kawai (河井博大, Kawai Hiroo; born 13 November 1971) is a Japanese professional golfer.

== Career ==
Kawai has played on the Japan Golf Tour since 1997. He has one win on tour, the 2011 Japan PGA Championship Nissin Cupnoodle Cup.

== Professional wins (1) ==
=== Japan Golf Tour wins (1) ===
Legend
Japan majors (1)
Other Japan Golf Tour (0)

No.	Date	Tournament	Winning score	Margin of victory	Runner-up
1	15 May 2011	Japan PGA Championship Nissin Cupnoodle Cup	−9 (71-67-69-68=275)	2 strokes	(South Korea) Bae Sang-moon
