= Eiichi Itai =

Japanese golfer

Personal information
- Nationality: Japan
- Born: 23 March 1951 (age 75) Akita Prefecture, Japan
- Height: 1.83 m (6 ft 0 in)
- Weight: 86 kg (190 lb; 13.5 st)

Career
- Sport: Golf
- Status: Professional
- Former tour: Japan Golf Tour
- Professional wins: 3

Number of wins by tour
- Japan Golf Tour: 3

Eiichi Itai (born 23 March 1951) is a Japanese professional golfer.

== Career ==
Itai played on the Japan Golf Tour in the 1990s, winning three times.

== Professional wins (3) ==
=== PGA of Japan Tour wins (3) ===
No.	Date	Tournament	Winning score	Margin of victory	Runner(s)-up
1	14 Jul 1991	Yonex Open Hiroshima	−12 (67-69-71-65=272)	2 strokes	(Japan) Yoshi Mizumaki, (Japan) Tsuyoshi Yoneyama
2	6 Oct 1991	Tokai Classic	−9 (70-65-72-72=279)	4 strokes	(Japan) Nobumitsu Yuhara
3	12 Sep 1993	Suntory Open	−6 (73-70-70-69=282)	1 stroke	(Taiwan) Chen Tze-chung

PGA of Japan Tour playoff record (0–1)

No.	Year	Tournament	Opponent	Result
1	1991	Nikkei Cup	(Japan) Naomichi Ozaki	Lost to par on first extra hole
