= Yoshihisa Iwashita =

Japanese professional golfer

Personal information
- Nationality: Japan
- Born: 13 June 1949 (age 77) Shizuoka Prefecture, Japan
- Height: 1.65 m (5 ft 5 in)
- Weight: 60 kg (130 lb; 9.4 st)

Career
- Sport: Golf
- Status: Professional
- Current tour: Japan Golf Tour
- Professional wins: 1

Number of wins by tour
- Japan Golf Tour: 1

Yoshihisa Iwashita (born 13 June 1949) is a Japanese professional golfer.

== Career ==
Iwashita played on the Japan Golf Tour, winning once.

== Professional wins (1) ==
=== PGA of Japan Tour wins (1) ===
No.	Date	Tournament	Winning score	Margin of victory	Runner-up
1	30 Sep 1984	Tokai Classic	−12 (71-63-71-71=276)	2 strokes	(Japan) Masahiro Kuramoto

PGA of Japan Tour playoff record (0–2)

No.	Year	Tournament	Opponent(s)	Result
1	1984	Bridgestone Tournament	(Taiwan) Chen Tze-chung, (Japan) Masahiro Kuramoto, (Scotland) Sam Torrance	Kuramoto won with eagle on first extra hole
2	1985	NST Niigata Open	(Taiwan) Hsieh Min-Nan	Lost to par on first extra hole
