= Hideto Shigenobu =

Japanese golfer

Personal information
- Nationality: Japan
- Born: 11 December 1954 (age 71) Osaka Prefecture, Japan
- Height: 1.75 m (5 ft 9 in)
- Weight: 78 kg (172 lb; 12.3 st)

Career
- Sport: Golf
- Turned professional: 1979
- Former tour: Japan Golf Tour
- Professional wins: 5

Number of wins by tour
- Japan Golf Tour: 5

Hideto Shigenobu (born 11 December 1954) is a Japanese professional golfer.

== Career ==
Shigenobu played on the Japan Golf Tour, winning five times.

== Professional wins (5) ==
=== PGA of Japan Tour wins (5) ===
| No. | Date | Tournament | Winning score | Margin of victory | Runner(s)-up |
|---|---|---|---|---|---|
| 1 | 23 Sep 1979 | Chushikoku Open | −5 (68-72-69-74=283) | 2 strokes | |
| 2 | 1 Aug 1982 | Kansai Pro Championship | −11 (68-70-68-71=277) | 4 strokes | (Japan) Teruo Sugihara |
| 3 | 24 Jul 1983 | Niigata Open | −8 (67-69=136) | Playoff | (Japan) Isao Aoki, (Japan) Katsunari Takahashi |
| 4 | 15 Apr 1984 | Bridgestone Aso Open | −5 (69-71-72-71=283) | Playoff | (Japan) Katsuji Hasegawa, (Japan) Akira Yabe |
| 5 | 27 Apr 1986 | Dunlop International Open^{1} | −7 (74-67-68-72=281) | 2 strokes | (United States) David Ishii, (Japan) Masahiro Kuramoto |

^{1}Co-sanctioned by the Asia Golf Circuit

PGA of Japan Tour playoff record (2–3)

| No. | Year | Tournament | Opponent(s) | Result |
|---|---|---|---|---|
| 1 | 1981 | Tokai Classic | (Japan) Fujio Kobayashi, (Japan) Masahiro Kuramoto, (Japan) Tōru Nakamura | Kuramoto won with par on first extra hole |
| 2 | 1983 | Niigata Open | (Japan) Isao Aoki, (Japan) Katsunari Takahashi | Won with par on first extra hole |
| 3 | 1984 | Bridgestone Aso Open | (Japan) Katsuji Hasegawa, (Japan) Akira Yabe | |
| 4 | 1984 | Chushikoku Open | (Japan) Masahiro Kuramoto | |
| 5 | 1990 | Imperial Open | (Japan) Tōru Nakamura | Lost to birdie on fourth extra hole |

== Team appearances ==
- World Cup (representing Japan): 1993
