= Kouichi Inoue =

Japanese golfer

Personal information
- Nationality: Japan
- Born: 26 September 1946 (age 80)
- Height: 1.70 m (5 ft 7 in)
- Weight: 67 kg (148 lb; 10.6 st)

Career
- Sport: Golf
- Status: Professional
- Former tour: Japan Golf Tour
- Professional wins: 3

Number of wins by tour
- Japan Golf Tour: 2
- Other: 1

Kouichi Inoue (井上 幸一, Inoue Kōichi; born 26 September 1946) is a Japanese professional golfer.

== Career ==
Inoue played on the Japan Golf Tour, winning twice.

== Professional wins (3) ==
=== PGA of Japan Tour wins (2) ===
No.	Date	Tournament	Winning score	Margin of victory	Runner-up
1	15 Jul 1978	Chubu Open	−11 (66-67-74-70=277)	2 strokes	(Japan) Hisashi Suzumura
2	3 Jun 1984	Tohoku Classic	−12 (70-67-67-72=276)	1 stroke	(Taiwan) Chen Tze-ming

=== Other wins (1) ===
- 1980 Toyama Open

== Team appearances ==
- World Cup (representing Japan): 1979
