= Norio Mikami =

Japanese professional golfer (born 1947)

Personal information
- Nationality: Japan
- Born: 1 March 1947 (age 79) Hiroshima, Japan
- Height: 1.73 m (5 ft 8 in)
- Weight: 70 kg (150 lb; 11 st)

Career
- Sport: Golf
- Status: Professional
- Current tour: Japan Golf Tour
- Professional wins: 2

Number of wins by tour
- Japan Golf Tour: 2

Norio Mikami (三上 法夫, Mikami Norio; born 1 March 1947) is a Japanese professional golfer.

== Career ==
Mikami played on the Japan Golf Tour, winning twice.

== Professional wins (2) ==
=== PGA of Japan Tour wins (2) ===
No.	Date	Tournament	Winning score	Margin of victory	Runners-up
1	5 Aug 1979	Nihon Kokudo Keikaku Summers	−9 (73-70-66-70=279)	3 strokes	(Japan) Kenji Mori, (Japan) Kazuo Yoshikawa
2	19 Apr 1987	Bridgestone Aso Open	−8 (69-67-74-70=280)	4 strokes	(United States) David Ishii, (Japan) Shuichi Sano
