= Fujio Kobayashi =

Japanese professional golfer

Personal information
- Nationality: Japan
- Born: 15 July 1944 (age 82) Kanagawa Prefecture, Japan
- Height: 1.74 m (5 ft 9 in)
- Weight: 73 kg (161 lb; 11.5 st)

Career
- Sport: Golf
- Status: Professional
- Former tour: Japan Golf Tour
- Professional wins: 8

Number of wins by tour
- Japan Golf Tour: 5
- Other: 3

Fujio Kobayashi (小林 富士夫, Kobayashi Fujio; born 15 July 1944) is a Japanese professional golfer.

== Career ==
Kobayashi played on the Japan Golf Tour, winning five times.

== Professional wins (8) ==
=== PGA of Japan Tour wins (5) ===
No.	Date	Tournament	Winning score	Margin of victory	Runner-up
1	30 Oct 1977	Bridgestone Tournament	−10 (71-69-68-70=278)	3 strokes	(Japan) Haruo Yasuda
2	20 Aug 1978	Japan PGA Championship	−7 (69-71-74-67=281)	Playoff	(Japan) Tsuneyuki Nakajima
3	2 Jul 1981	Naganoken Open	−6 (69-69=138) (Note: Shortened to 36/54 holes due to weather.)	Shared title with (Japan) Masaji Kusakabe	
4	18 Jul 1982	Gunmaken Open	−5 (68-68-75=211)	4 strokes	(Japan) Hiroshi Ishii
5	17 Apr 1983	Bridgestone Aso Open	−3 (73-69-71=213)	Playoff	(Japan) Tadami Ueno

PGA of Japan Tour playoff record (2–1)

No.	Year	Tournament	Opponent(s)	Result
1	1978	Japan PGA Championship	(Japan) Tsuneyuki Nakajima	Won with birdie on first extra hole
2	1981	Tokai Classic	(Japan) Masahiro Kuramoto, (Japan) Tōru Nakamura, (Japan) Hideto Shigenobu	Kuramoto won with par on first extra hole
3	1983	Bridgestone Aso Open	(Japan) Tadami Ueno	Won with birdie on first extra hole

=== Japan Challenge Tour wins (1) ===
- 1991 Korakuen Cup (4th)

=== Other wins (1) ===
- 1976 Kuzuha International

=== Senior wins (1) ===
- 2001 Japan Senior Open
