= Hiroshi Ishii (golfer) =

Japanese golfer

Personal information
- Nationality: Japan
- Born: 3 June 1941 Shizuoka Prefecture, Japan
- Died: 27 December 2006 (aged 65)
- Height: 1.79 m (5 ft 10 in)
- Weight: 81 kg (179 lb; 12.8 st)

Career
- Sport: Golf
- Status: Professional
- Former tour: Japan Golf Tour
- Professional wins: 10

Number of wins by tour
- Japan Golf Tour: 7
- Other: 3

Hiroshi Ishii (3 June 1941 – 27 December 2006) was a Japanese professional golfer.

== Career ==
Ishii played on the Japan Golf Tour, winning seven times.

== Professional wins (10) ==
=== PGA of Japan Tour wins (7) ===
No.	Date	Tournament	Winning score	Margin of victory	Runner(s)-up
1	30 Aug 1973	Chubu Open	−1 (71-71-75-70=287)	Playoff	(Japan) Akio Toyoda
2	4 Nov 1973	Bridgestone Tournament	−13 (71-70-68-67=275)	2 strokes	(Japan) Haruo Yasuda
3	3 Aug 1975	Kansai Pro Championship	−5 (72-74-70-67=283)	7 strokes	(Japan) Teruo Sugihara, (Japan) Shigeru Uchida
4	16 Jul 1977	Chubu Open (2)	−2 (71-70-73-72=286)		
5	29 Oct 1978	Bridgestone Tournament (2)	−8 (68-75-69-68=280)	2 strokes	(Japan) Fujio Kobayashi
6	22 Apr 1979	Dunlop International Open^{1}	−10 (70-68-70-70=278)	3 strokes	(Japan) Seiji Ebihara, (Japan) Tateo Ozaki, (Japan) Katsunari Takahashi
7	9 Dec 1984	Daikyo Open	−7 (68-71-71-71=281)	1 stroke	(Japan) Masayuki Imai

^{1}Co-sanctioned by the Asia Golf Circuit

PGA of Japan Tour playoff record (1–1)

No.	Year	Tournament	Opponent	Result
1	1973	Chubu Open	(Japan) Akio Toyoda	
2	1975	KBC Augusta	(Japan) Shinsaku Maeda	Lost to par on first extra hole

=== Other wins (2) ===
- 1969 Japan PGA Championship
- 1971 All Nippon Doubles Tournament (with Shigeru Uchida)

=== Senior wins (1) ===
- 1991 Japan PGA Senior Championship
