= Takashi Kurihara =

Japanese professional golfer

Personal information
- Nationality: Japan
- Born: 21 October 1947 (age 79) Tokyo, Japan
- Height: 1.72 m (5 ft 8 in)
- Weight: 70 kg (150 lb; 11 st)

Career
- Sport: Golf
- Status: Professional
- Former tour: Japan Golf Tour
- Professional wins: 5

Number of wins by tour
- Japan Golf Tour: 5

Takashi Kurihara (born 21 October 1947) is a Japanese professional golfer.

== Career ==
Kurihara played on the Japan Golf Tour, winning five times.

== Professional wins (5) ==
=== PGA of Japan Tour wins (5) ===
No.	Date	Tournament	Winning score	Margin of victory	Runner(s)-up
1	9 Sep 1973	Kanto Open	−4 (72-69-73-70=284)		
2	24 Nov 1974	Shizuoka Open	−1 (71-71-69-76=287)	7 strokes	(Japan) Seiichi Kanai
3	8 Apr 1979	Aso National Park Open	+5 (73-76=149)	Playoff	(Japan) Shinsaku Maeda, (Japan) Haruo Yasuda
4	26 Sep 1982	Hiroshima Open	−12 (69-67-70-66=272)	4 strokes	(Japan) Yutaka Hagawa
5	9 Sep 1984	Suntory Open	−17 (64-69-67-71=271)	2 strokes	(Japan) Isao Aoki
