= Tadao Nakamura =

Japanese professional golfer

Personal information
- Nationality: Japan
- Born: 2 January 1947 (age 79) Kanagawa Prefecture, Japan
- Height: 1.71 m (5 ft 7 in)
- Weight: 80 kg (180 lb; 13 st)

Career
- Sport: Golf
- Status: Professional
- Former tour: Japan Golf Tour
- Professional wins: 4

Number of wins by tour
- Japan Golf Tour: 4

Tadao Nakamura (born 2 January 1947) is a Japanese professional golfer.

== Career ==
Nakamura played on the Japan Golf Tour, winning four times.

== Professional wins (4) ==
=== PGA of Japan Tour wins (4) ===
No.	Date	Tournament	Winning score	Margin of victory	Runner(s)-up
1	2 Aug 1987	NST Niigata Open	−8 (67-71-67-71=276)	1 stroke	(Taiwan) Hsieh Chin-sheng, (United States) David Ishii, (Australia) Brian Jones, (Japan) Kazuo Yoshikawa
2	3 Sep 1989	Chubu Open	−6 (72-68-70=210)	1 stroke	(Japan) Masahiro Shiota
3	20 May 1990	Pepsi Ube Kosan Open	−10 (67-70-66=203) (Note: Shortened to 54 holes due to weather.)	4 strokes	(Japan) Tadami Ueno
4	10 Jun 1990	Sapporo Tokyu Open	−10 (69-67-75-67=278)	1 stroke	(Taiwan) Chen Tze-chung, (Australia) Brian Jones
