= Pete Izumikawa =

Japanese professional golfer (born 1956)

Personal information
- Nationality: Japan
- Born: 4 May 1956 (age 70) Okinawa Prefecture, Japan
- Height: 1.78 m (5 ft 10 in)
- Weight: 78 kg (172 lb; 12.3 st)

Career
- Sport: Golf
- Status: Professional
- Current tour: Japan Golf Tour
- Professional wins: 4

Number of wins by tour
- Japan Golf Tour: 4

Pete Izumikawa (born 4 May 1956) is a Japanese professional golfer.

== Career ==
Izumikawa played on the Japan Golf Tour, winning four times.

== Professional wins (4) ==
=== PGA of Japan Tour wins (4) ===
No.	Date	Tournament	Winning score	Margin of victory	Runner-up
1	12 Sep 1982	Suntory Open	−9 (67-68-72=207) (Note: Shortened to 54 holes due to weather.)	2 strokes	(United States) Bill Rogers
2	1 Jul 1984	Kanto Pro Championship	−8 (66-70-72=208)	Playoff	(Japan) Saburo Fujiki
3	16 Sep 1984	ANA Sapporo Open	−8 (68-68-76-68=280)	Playoff	(Japan) Satsuki Takahashi
4	31 Jul 1994	NST Niigata Open	−12 (67-70-70-69=276)	2 strokes	(Japan) Kiyoshi Murota

== Team appearances ==
- World Cup (representing Japan): 1982
