= Chubu Open =

Golf tournament in Japan

The Chubu Open is a golf tournament in the Chūbu region of Japan. It was first played in 1971, and was an event on the Japan Golf Tour from 1973 to 1991.

== Winners ==
- 2026
- 2025 Kaneko Kota
- 2024 Gondo Kota
- 2023 Kenya Nakayama
- 2022 Mitsumasa Tamura
- 2021 Kinihiro Kamii
- 2020 Cancelled due to the COVID-19 pandemic
- 2019 Kazuki Ishiwata
- 2018 Daiki Imano (amateur)
- 2017 Masatsugu Fujishima
- 2016 Keisuke Kondo
- 2015 Daiki Imano (amateur)
- 2014 Shota Kishimoto
- 2013 Keisuke Kondo
- 2012 Takaya Onoda (amateur)
- 2011 Tatsuya Tanioka
- 2010 Kotaro Kajimoto
- 2009 Junpei Takayama
- 2008 Kunihiro Komii
- 2007 Hiro Aoyama
- 2006 Yosuke Uraguchi
- 2005 Hisashi Sawada
- 2004 Yosuke Uraguchi
- 2003 Keishiro Nakata
- 2002 Takeru Shibata
- 2001 Masashi Shimada
- 2000 Shoichi Yamamoto
- 1999 Eiji Mizoguchi
- 1998 Toshio Ozaki
- 1997 Junji Kawase
- 1996 Shoichi Yamamoto
- 1995 Junji Kawase
- 1994 Eiji Mizoguchi
- 1993 Junji Kawase
- 1992 Naoya Sugiyama
- 1991 Teruo Nakamura
- 1990 Hatsutoshi Sakai
- 1989 Tadao Nakamura
- 1988 Teruo Nakamura
- 1987 Eitaro Deguchi
- 1986 Eitaro Deguchi
- 1985 Masahiro Shiota
- 1984 Teruo Suzumura
- 1983 Teruo Nakamura
- 1982 Shigeru Uchida
- 1981 Shigeru Uchida
- 1980 Hisashi Suzumura
- 1979 Kanaichi Matsuoka
- 1978 Kouichi Inoue
- 1977 Hiroshi Ishii
- 1976 Chen Chien-chin
- 1975 Hideo Noguchi
- 1974 Tadashi Kitta
- 1973 Hiroshi Ishii
- 1972 Tadashi Kitta
- 1971 Shigeru Uchida
