= Shinsaku Maeda =

Japanese professional golfer (born 1952)

Shinsaku Maeda 前田新作
Personal information
- Nationality: Japan
- Born: 9 February 1952 (age 74) Osaka Prefecture
- Height: 1.72 m (5 ft 8 in)
- Weight: 67 kg (148 lb; 10.6 st)

Career
- Sport: Golf
- Status: Professional
- Former tour: Japan Golf Tour
- Professional wins: 10

Number of wins by tour
- Japan Golf Tour: 9
- Other: 1

Achievements and awards
- PGA of Japan Tour money list winner: 1984

Shinsaku Maeda (前田 新作, Maeda Shinsaku; born 9 February 1952) is a Japanese professional golfer.

== Career ==
He won eight tournaments on the Japan Golf Tour and led the money list in 1984.

== Professional wins (10) ==
=== PGA of Japan Tour wins (9) ===
No.	Date	Tournament	Winning score	Margin of victory	Runner(s)-up
1	24 Aug 1975	KBC Augusta	−10 (69-70-73-66=278)	Playoff	(Japan) Hiroshi Ishii
2	18 Jul 1976	Kansai Open Golf Championship	−15 (67-69-70-67=273)		
3	1 Aug 1976	Kansai Pro Championship	−18 (62-67-72-65=266)		
4	21 Nov 1976	Golf Nippon Series	−5 (72-70-72-71=285)	3 strokes	(Japan) Haruo Yasuda
5	5 Jul 1981	JPGA East-West Tournament	−6 (66-68=134)	3 strokes	(Japan) Masashi Ozaki
6	6 Jun 1982	Tohoku Classic	−8 (72-70-66=208) (Note: Shortened to 54 holes due to weather.)	2 strokes	(Australia) Graham Marsh, (Japan) Toshiyuki Tsuchiyama
7	23 Sep 1984	Gene Sarazen Jun Classic	−10 (68-69-70-71=278)	1 stroke	(Japan) Tateo Ozaki
8	14 Oct 1984	Golf Digest Tournament	−14 (72-71-65-66=274)	3 strokes	(Japan) Seiji Ebihara
9	11 Nov 1984	Taiheiyo Club Masters	−13 (69-68-66-72=275)	1 stroke	(Japan) Kikuo Arai, (Japan) Naomichi Ozaki

PGA of Japan Tour playoff record (1–4)

No.	Year	Tournament	Opponent(s)	Result
1	1975	KBC Augusta	(Japan) Hiroshi Ishii	Won with par on first extra hole
2	1977	Kansai Pro Championship	(Japan) Kosaku Shimada	Lost to par on first extra hole
3	1979	Aso National Park Open	(Japan) Takashi Kurihara, (Japan) Haruo Yasuda	
4	1983	Pocari-Sweat Hakuryuko Open	(Japan) Saburo Fujiki, (Japan) Hiroshi Makino, (Australia) Graham Marsh	Makino won with birdie on second extra hole after three-hole aggregate playoff; Fujiki: −1 (3-4-4=11), Makino: −1 (3-4-4=11), Marsh: +1 (3-5-5=13), Maeda: +2 (4-5-5=14)
5	1991	Sapporo Tokyu Open	(Canada) Rick Gibson, (Japan) Masahiro Kuramoto	Gibson won with birdie on first extra hole

=== Other wins (1) ===
- 1984 Hokkoku Open

== Team appearances ==
- Nissan Cup (representing Japan): 1985
