= Ube Kosan Open =

Professional golf tournament that was held in Japan from 1972 until 2001

Tournament information
- Location: Ube, Yamaguchi, Japan
- Established: 1972
- Course: Ube 72 Country Club
- Par: 72
- Length: 6,859 yards (6,272 m)
- Tour: Japan Golf Tour
- Format: Stroke play
- Prize fund: ¥140,000,000
- Month played: November
- Final year: 2001

Tournament record score
- Aggregate: 264 Shigeki Maruyama (1993); 264 Hidemichi Tanaka (1996)
- To par: −21 Dean Wilson (2001)

Final champion
- (United States) Dean Wilson
- Location in Japan Location in the Yamaguchi Prefecture

The Ube Kosan Open was a professional golf tournament that was held in Japan from 1972 until 2001. It was played at the Ube 72 Country Club near Ube, Yamaguchi. It was an event on the Japan Golf Tour.

In 1976, the Pepsi-Wilson Tournament, as it was then known, set a record for the longest sudden-death playoff in a major men's professional tournament. It took Peter Thomson fourteen holes to defeat Graham Marsh, Brian Jones and Shozo Miyamoto. This record still stands.

== Tournament hosts ==
Year(s)	Host course	Location
1976, 1978, 1980–2001	Ube 72 Country Club (various courses)	Ube, Yamaguchi
1979	Hachinohe Country Club	Hashikami, Aomori
1974	Katayamazu Golf Club (Hakusan)	Kaga, Ishikawa
1972–1973, 1975, 1977	Yokohama Country Club (West)	Yokohama, Kanagawa

== Winners ==
Year	Winner	Score	To par	Margin of victory	Runner(s)-up	Ref.
Ube Kosan Open
2001	(United States) Dean Wilson	267	−21	1 stroke	(Japan) Taichi Teshima	
2000	(Japan) Keiichiro Fukabori	276	−12	3 strokes	(Japan) Tatsuya Shiraishi (Japan) Toru Taniguchi	
1999	(South Korea) K. J. Choi	272	−16	3 strokes	(Japan) Kazuhiko Hosokawa	
1998	(United States) Brandt Jobe	271	−17	2 strokes	(Japan) Shigeki Maruyama	
1997	(Japan) Shigenori Mori	267	−17	4 strokes	(Japan) Shigemasa Higaki	
Pepsi Ube Kosan Open
1996	(Japan) Hidemichi Tanaka	264	−20	2 strokes	(Japan) Tsuneyuki Nakajima (United States) Brian Watts	
1995	(Japan) Mitsutaka Kusakabe	206 (Note: Shortened to 54 holes due to rain.)	−10	3 strokes	(Japan) Harumitsu Hamano (Japan) Kōki Idoki (Australia) Roger Mackay (Japan) Katsunari Takahashi	
1994	(Japan) Tsuneyuki Nakajima (2)	268	−16	3 strokes	(Japan) Tsukasa Watanabe	
1993	(Japan) Shigeki Maruyama	264	−20	2 strokes	(United States) Todd Hamilton	
1992	(Japan) Tsuneyuki Nakajima	275	−13	5 strokes	(Japan) Hirofumi Miyase	
Ube Kosan Open
1991	(Taiwan) Chen Tze-chung	274	−10	2 strokes	(Japan) Saburo Fujiki	
Pepsi Ube Kosan Open
1990	(Japan) Tadao Nakamura	203	−10	4 strokes	(Japan) Tadami Ueno	
1989	(Japan) Akihito Yokoyama	203	−13	Playoff (Note: Yokoyama won with a bogey on the second hole of a sudden-death playoff.)	(Japan) Yoshimi Niizeki	
Pepsi Ube Open
1988	(Japan) Mamoru Kondo	169 (Note: Shortened to 45 holes due to rain.)	−11	1 stroke	(Japan) Masahiro Kuramoto	
1987	(Taiwan) Chen Tze-ming (2)	278	−10	Playoff (Note: Chen won with a birdie on the first hole of a sudden-death playoff.)	(Japan) Hiroshi Makino	
1986	(Japan) Naomichi Ozaki	276	−12	1 stroke	(Japan) Fujio Kobayashi	
1985	(Taiwan) Chen Tze-ming	268	−20	4 strokes	(Japan) Katsunari Takahashi	
1984	(Japan) Yasuhiro Funatogawa	272	−16	2 strokes	(Japan) Kikuo Arai (Japan) Naomichi Ozaki	
1983	(Japan) Seiichi Kanai	274	−14	2 strokes	(Japan) Kouichi Inoue	
1982	(Japan) Kikuo Arai	277	−11	2 strokes	(Japan) Motomasa Aoki	
Pepsi-Wilson Tournament
1981	(Australia) Graham Marsh (2)	270	−18	1 stroke	(Japan) Yutaka Hagawa	
1980	(Japan) Norio Suzuki	276	−12	1 stroke	(Japan) Isao Aoki	
1979	(Myanmar) Mya Aye	274	−10	3 strokes	(Japan) Hiroshi Ishii	
1978	(Japan) Masashi Ozaki (2)	275	−13	5 strokes	(Japan) Isao Aoki (Japan) Fujio Kobayashi (Japan) Kosaku Shimada	
1977	(Japan) Masashi Ozaki	274	−14	4 strokes	(Taiwan) Kuo Chie-Hsiung	
1976	(Australia) Peter Thomson (2)	211	−5	Playoff (Note: Thomson won the sudden-death playoff at the 14th extra hole; Miyamoto was eliminated at the first extra hole, and Jones at the fourth.)	(Australia) Brian Jones (Australia) Graham Marsh (Japan) Shozo Miyamoto	
1975	(Taiwan) Hsieh Yung-yo	283	−5	1 stroke	(Australia) Graham Marsh (Japan) Toshiaki Sekimizu	
Pepsi Tournament
1974	(Australia) Graham Marsh	284	−4	Playoff (Note: Marsh won with a birdie on the fourth hole of a sudden-death playoff.)	(Taiwan) Hsieh Yung-yo	
1973	(Japan) Isao Aoki	281	−7	Playoff	(Japan) Kosaku Shimada	
1972	(Australia) Peter Thomson	279	−9	1 stroke	(Taiwan) Chen Chien-chung (South Korea) Han Chang-sang (Japan) Takashi Murakami	
