= KSB Open =

Georgia KSB Open
Tournament information
- Location: Tamano, Okayama, Japan
- Established: 1981
- Course: Tojigaoka Marinehills Golf Club
- Par: 72
- Length: 6,947 yards (6,352 m)
- Tour: Japan Golf Tour
- Format: Stroke play
- Prize fund: ¥70,000,000
- Month played: March
- Final year: 1999

Tournament record score
- Aggregate: 267 Carlos Franco (1998)
- To par: −17 Rick Gibson (1995) −17 Carlos Franco (1998)

Final champion
- (Japan) Yoshinori Kaneko
- Location in Japan Location in the Okayama Prefecture

The KSB Open was a professional golf tournament that was held in Japan. Founded as the KSB Kagawa Open in 1981, it was an event on the Japan Golf Tour in 1983 and again from 1989. It was played until 1999, after which it was merged with the Descente Classic to create the Munsingwear Open KSB Cup.

== Tournament hosts ==
Year(s)	Host course	Location
1999	Tojigaoka Marine Hills Golf Club	Tamano, Okayama
1998	Ayutaki Country Club	Takamatsu, Kagawa
1994–1997	Kinojo Golf Club	Sōja, Okayama
1990, 1992–1993	Sanyoh Golf Club Yoshii	Akaiwa, Okayama
1981, 1983–1984, 1987–1989, 1991	Shido Country Club	Sanuki, Kagawa

== Winners ==
Year	Winner	Score	To par	Margin of victory	Runner-up	Ref.
Georgia KSB Open
1999	(Japan) Yoshinori Kaneko	275	−13	1 stroke	(Philippines) Frankie Miñoza	
Just System KSB Open
1998	(Paraguay) Carlos Franco	267	−17	4 strokes	(Philippines) Frankie Miñoza	
1997	(Japan) Keiichiro Fukabori	276	−12	2 strokes	(Japan) Katsunori Kuwabara (Japan) Toshiaki Odate	
Novell KSB Open
1996	(Japan) Toru Suzuki	275	−13	1 stroke	(Colombia) Eduardo Herrera (United States) Brian Watts	
1995	(Canada) Rick Gibson	271	−17	1 stroke	(Japan) Toshimitsu Izawa (Japan) Tsukasa Watanabe	
United KSB Open
1994	(Japan) Kazuhiro Takami	281	−7	6 strokes	(Japan) Yoshinori Kaneko	
TaylorMade KSB Open
1993	(Japan) Tateo Ozaki	276	−12	1 stroke	(Australia) Roger Mackay	
1992	(Japan) Seiki Okuda	210 (Note: Shortened to 54 holes due to weather.)	−6	4 strokes	(Japan) Seiji Ebihara (Japan) Satoshi Higashi	
1991	(Japan) Masanobu Kimura	273	−15	3 strokes	(Japan) Nobuo Serizawa (Japan) Teruo Sugihara	
Seto Uthumi Open
1990	(Japan) Masahiro Kuramoto (2)	295	+7	1 stroke	(Japan) Ryoken Kawagishi (Japan) Noboru Sugai	
Setonaikai Open
1989	(Japan) Naomichi Ozaki	282	−6	2 strokes	(Japan) Kinpachi Yoshimura	
TaylorMade Setonaikai Open
1988	(Australia) Wayne Smith	213	−3	1 stroke	(Japan) Norio Mikami (Japan) Kenji Mori	
KSB Setonaikai Open
1987	(Japan) Katsunari Takahashi	140	−4	2 strokes	(Japan) Yurio Akitomi (Australia) Mike Harwood (Japan) Minoru Nakamura	
1986	(Japan) Minoru Nakamura					
1985	(Japan) Masahiro Kuramoto					
1984	(Japan) Shuichi Sano	136	−8	2 strokes	(Japan) Shichiro Enomoto	
1983	(Japan) Kenji Sogame	140	−4	Playoff (Note: Sogame was awarded the title when Yasuda was unable to take part in the playoff having left the course and travelled to the airport believing he was out of contention.)	(Japan) Haruo Yasuda	
KSB Kagawa Open
1982	(Japan) Shigeru Uchida					
1981	(Japan) Toshimitsu Kai	141		1 stroke	(Japan) Tsuneyuki Nakajima (Japan) Kosaku Shimada	
