= Seiki Okuda =

Japanese professional golfer

Personal information
- Nationality: Japan
- Born: 1 April 1960 (age 66) Osaka Prefecture, Japan
- Height: 1.75 m (5 ft 9 in)
- Weight: 75 kg (165 lb; 11.8 st)

Career
- Sport: Golf
- Turned professional: 1985
- Current tour: Champions Tour
- Former tour: Japan Golf Tour
- Professional wins: 9

Number of wins by tour
- Japan Golf Tour: 6
- Other: 3

Seiki Okuda (奥田 靖己, Okuda Seiki; born 1 April 1960) is a Japanese professional golfer.

== Career ==
Okuda played on the Japan Golf Tour, winning six times.

== Professional wins (9) ==
=== Japan Golf Tour wins (6) ===
Legend
Flagship events (1)
Other Japan Golf Tour (5)

No.	Date	Tournament	Winning score	Margin of victory	Runner(s)-up
1	2 Sep 1990	Chushikoku Open	−5 (71-70-71-71=283)	Playoff	(Japan) Masayuki Kawamura, (Japan) Tsukasa Watanabe
2	29 Mar 1992	TaylorMade KSB Open	−6 (74-70-66=210) (Note: Shortened to 54 holes due to weather.)	4 strokes	(Japan) Seiji Ebihara, (Japan) Satoshi Higashi
3	18 Oct 1992	Asahi Beer Golf Digest Tournament	−12 (72-64-68-68=272)	1 stroke	(Australia) Roger Mackay
4	27 Jun 1993	Mizuno Open	−8 (70-68-72-70=280)	1 stroke	(Australia) Wayne Grady, (Japan) Tateo Ozaki, (Japan) Teruo Sugihara
5	10 Oct 1993	Japan Open Golf Championship	−3 (69-72-71-69=281)	5 strokes	(Japan) Masashi Ozaki
6	26 Nov 1995	Casio World Open	−14 (69-72-69-64=274)	1 stroke	(Japan) Masashi Ozaki

Japan Golf Tour playoff record (1–1)

No.	Year	Tournament	Opponent(s)	Result
1	1990	Chushikoku Open	(Japan) Masayuki Kawamura, (Japan) Tsukasa Watanabe	
2	1999	Fancl Okinawa Open	(Japan) Taichi Teshima	Lost to birdie on first extra hole

=== Other wins (1) ===
- 2015 Legend Charity Pro-Am

=== Japan PGA Senior Tour wins (2) ===
- 2013 Fujifilm Senior Championship
- 2014 Kyoraku More Surprise Cup
