= JCB Classic =

Professional golf tournament in Japan

Tournament information
- Location: Sendai, Miyagi, Japan
- Established: 1972
- Course: Hananomori Golf Club
- Par: 71
- Length: 7,038 yards (6,436 m)
- Tour: Japan Golf Tour
- Format: Stroke play
- Prize fund: ¥100,000,000
- Month played: May/June
- Final year: 2007

Tournament record score
- Aggregate: 264 Katsuyoshi Tomori (2003)
- To par: −20 as above

Final champion
- (Japan) Tomohiro Kondo
- Location in Japan Location in the Miyagi Prefecture

The JCB Classic was a professional golf tournament held near Sendai in Miyagi Prefecture, Japan. It was founded in 1972 as the Tohoku Classic, and was an event on the Japan Golf Tour from 1973 until 2007.

The Tohoku Classic was held at Nishisendai Country Club until 1987. In 1988 it moved to Omotezao Kokusai Golf Club and was renamed the Sendai Classic; sponsored as the JCB Classic Sendai from 1990. The final event, in 2007, was held at Hananomori Golf Club as the JCB Classic and the prize fund was ¥100,000,000 with ¥20,000,000 going to the winner.

== Tournament hosts ==
Year(s)	Host course	Location
2007	Hananomori Golf Club	Ōhira, Miyagi
1988–2006	Omotezao Kokusai Golf Club	Shibata, Miyagi
1972–1987	Nishisendai Country Club	Sendai, Miyagi

== Winners ==
Year	Winner	Score	To par	Margin of victory	Runner(s)-up	Ref.
JCB Classic
2007	(Japan) Tomohiro Kondo	271	−13	1 stroke	(South Korea) Lee Seong-ho (Japan) Koumei Oda (Japan) Mamo Osanai (Japan) Azuma Yano	
JCB Classic Sendai
2006	(Japan) Hideto Tanihara	266	−18	5 strokes	(Japan) Shingo Katayama	
2005	(South Korea) Hur Suk-ho	265	−19	1 stroke	(Japan) Shinichi Yokota	
2004	(Japan) Takashi Kamiyama	271	−13	Playoff	(Japan) Tomohiro Kondo (Japan) Tsuneyuki Nakajima	
2003	(Japan) Katsuyoshi Tomori	264	−20	2 strokes	(Japan) Yūsaku Miyazato	
2002	(Japan) Toru Suzuki	271	−13	Playoff	(Japan) Tsuneyuki Nakajima	
2001	(Japan) Toshiaki Odate	275	−9	2 strokes	(Japan) Taichi Teshima	
2000	(Japan) Nobuhito Sato (2)	271	−13	3 strokes	(Japan) Toshimitsu Izawa	
1999	(Japan) Shingo Katayama	268	−16	Playoff	(Japan) Shigemasa Higaki	
1998	(Japan) Yoshi Mizumaki (2)	270	−14	1 stroke	(Japan) Shigeki Maruyama	
1997	(Japan) Nobuhito Sato	267	−17	4 strokes	(Japan) Toshimitsu Izawa (Japan) Naomichi Ozaki	
1996	(Japan) Masashi Ozaki (5)	277	−7	Playoff	(United States) David Ishii	
1995	(Japan) Ryoken Kawagishi	271	−13	3 strokes	(Japan) Toru Suzuki	
1994	(Japan) Masahiro Kuramoto (2)	271	−13	2 strokes	(Japan) Toshiaki Sudo	
1993	(Japan) Yoshi Mizumaki	273	−11	Playoff	(Japan) Hajime Meshiai (Japan) Tsukasa Watanabe	
1992	(Australia) Roger Mackay (2)	271	−13	6 strokes	(England) Paul Hoad	
1991	(Japan) Tadami Ueno	271	−13	1 stroke	(Australia) Graham Marsh	
1990	(Australia) Roger Mackay	269	−15	3 strokes	(Australia) Graham Marsh (Japan) Tsuyoshi Yoneyama	
Sendai Classic
1989	(Japan) Masashi Ozaki (4)	272	−12	3 strokes	(Japan) Tsuneyuki Nakajima (Japan) Katsunari Takahashi	
1988	(Japan) Masahiro Kuramoto	204 (Note: Shortened to 54 holes due to weather.)	−9	2 strokes	(Japan) Futoshi Irino	
Tohoku Classic
1987	(Japan) Seiichi Kanai	275	−13	2 strokes	(Japan) Hajime Meshiai	
1986	(Japan) Teruo Sugihara (2)	280	−8	2 strokes	(Japan) Namio Takasu	
1985	(United States) David Ishii	275	−13	5 strokes	(Japan) Naomichi Ozaki	
1984	(Japan) Kouichi Inoue	276	−12	1 stroke	(Taiwan) Chen Tze-ming	
1983	(Japan) Yutaka Hagawa	277	−11	7 strokes	(Japan) Teruo Sugihara	
1982	(Japan) Shinsaku Maeda	208	−8	2 strokes	(Australia) Graham Marsh (Japan) Toshiyuki Tsuchiyama	
1981	(Japan) Teruo Sugihara	281	−7	4 strokes	(Japan) Shozo Miyamoto	
1980	(Japan) Haruo Yasuda (3)	273	−15	2 strokes	(Japan) Shinsaku Maeda	
1979	(Japan) Tōru Nakamura	278	−10	Playoff	(Taiwan) Hsieh Min-Nan	
1978	(Japan) Haruo Yasuda (2)	283	−5	1 stroke	(Japan) Shinsaku Maeda (Japan) Masashi Ozaki	
1977	(Japan) Isao Aoki	278	−10	1 stroke	(Taiwan) Lu Liang-Huan	
1976	(Japan) Haruo Yasuda	277	−11	Playoff	(Japan) Fumio Tanaka	
1975	(Japan) Masashi Ozaki (3)	278	−10	1 stroke	(Japan) Isao Aoki	
1974	(Japan) Masashi Ozaki (2)	280	−8	3 strokes	(Japan) Haruo Yasuda	
1973	(Japan) Masashi Ozaki	273	−15	3 strokes	(Taiwan) Lu Liang-Huan	
1972	(Japan) Takashi Murakami	283	−5	Playoff	(Japan) Masaji Kusakabe	
