= Descente Classic =

Professional golf tournament

Descente Classic Munsingwear Cup
Tournament information
- Location: Gotemba, Shizuoka, Japan
- Established: 1992
- Courses: Taiheiyo Club (Ichihara Course)
- Par: 72
- Length: 6,796 yards (6,214 m)
- Tour: Japan Golf Tour
- Format: Stroke play
- Prize fund: ¥90,000,000
- Month played: April
- Final year: 1999

Tournament record score
- Aggregate: 270 Peter Teravainen (1997)
- To par: −17 Dinesh Chand (1998)

Final champion
- (Japan) Masayuki Kawamura
- Location in Japan Location in the Shizuoka Prefecture

The Descente Classic was a professional golf tournament on the Japan Golf Tour. Founded in 1992 by sponsors Descente, it was renamed the Descente Classic Munsingwear Cup in 1995 and played until 1999, after which it was merged with the KSB Open to create the Munsingwear Open KSB Cup.

== Tournament hosts ==
Year(s)	Host course	Location
1998–1999	Taiheiyo Club (Ichihara Course)	Ichihara, Chiba
1996–1997	Edosaki Country Club	Inashiki, Ibaraki
1993–1995	Century Miki Golf Club	Miki, Hyōgo
1992	Century Yokawa Golf Club	Miki, Hyōgo

== Winners ==
Year	Winner	Score	To par	Margin of victory	Runner(s)-up
Descente Classic Munsingwear Cup
1999	(Japan) Masayuki Kawamura	205 (Note: Shortened to 54 holes due to weather.)	−11	Playoff	(Japan) Kazuhiko Hosokawa (Japan) Tsuyoshi Yoneyama
1998	(Fiji) Dinesh Chand	271	−17	2 strokes	(Paraguay) Carlos Franco (Japan) Hidemichi Tanaka
1997	(United States) Peter Teravainen	270	−14	2 strokes	(United States) Todd Hamilton
1996	(Japan) Masanobu Kimura	273	−11	2 strokes	(Japan) Hideyuki Sato
1995	(Japan) Satoshi Higashi	282	−6	1 stroke	(Japan) Katsuyoshi Tomori
Descente Classic
1994	(United States) Brian Watts	280	−8	3 strokes	(Japan) Hisao Inoue (Japan) Hideki Kase (Philippines) Frankie Miñoza (Japan) Tsukasa Watanabe
1993	(Japan) Tetsu Nishikawa	281	−7	2 strokes	(Japan) Shigenori Mori (Japan) Tsuyoshi Yoneyama
1992	(Japan) Yoshinori Kaneko	279	−9	2 strokes	(Japan) Masanobu Kimura
