= Masayuki Kawamura (golfer) =

Japanese professional golfer (born 1967)

Personal information
- Nationality: Japan
- Born: 15 March 1967 (age 59) Hiroshima Prefecture, Japan
- Height: 1.68 m (5 ft 6 in)
- Weight: 70 kg (150 lb; 11 st)

Career
- Sport: Golf
- Status: Professional
- Current tour: Japan PGA Senior Tour
- Former tour: Japan Golf Tour
- Professional wins: 8

Number of wins by tour
- Japan Golf Tour: 3
- Other: 5

Masayuki Kawamura (born 15 March 1967) is a Japanese professional golfer.

== Career ==
Kawamura played on the Japan Golf Tour, winning three times.

== Professional wins (8) ==
=== Japan Golf Tour wins (3) ===
No.	Date	Tournament	Winning score	Margin of victory	Runner(s)-up
1	8 Oct 1995	Tokai Classic	−3 (74-73-64-74=285)	1 stroke	(Japan) Hideki Kase
2	2 Aug 1998	NST Niigata Open Golf Championship	−20 (69-69-67-63=268)	8 strokes	(Japan) Shingo Katayama, (Japan) Kiyoshi Murota
3	4 Apr 1999	Descente Classic Munsingwear Cup	−11 (69-69-67=205) (Note: Shortened to 54 holes due to weather.)	Playoff	(Japan) Kazuhiko Hosokawa, (Japan) Tsuyoshi Yoneyama

Japan Golf Tour playoff record (1–1)

No.	Year	Tournament	Opponents	Result
1	1990	Chushikoku Open	(Japan) Seiki Okuda, (Japan) Tsukasa Watanabe	
2	1999	Descente Classic Munsingwear Cup	(Japan) Kazuhiko Hosokawa, (Japan) Tsuyoshi Yoneyama	Won with birdie on second extra hole

=== Japan Challenge Tour wins (1) ===
No.	Date	Tournament	Winning score	Margin of victory	Runner-up
1	2 Aug 2013	Daisen GC JGTO Challenge II	−11 (66-67=133)	Playoff	(South Korea) Kwon Ki-taek

=== Other wins (3) ===
- 1992 Chushikoku Open
- 2009 Chushikoku Open
- 2012 Chushikoku Open

=== Japan PGA Senior Tour wins (1) ===
No.	Date	Tournament	Winning score	Margin of victory	Runner-up
1	5 Dec 2020	Kanehide Senior Okinawa Open	−5 (68-71=139)	2 strokes	(Japan) Hiroo Okamo

== Team appearances ==
- World Cup (representing Japan): 1994
