= Daikyo Open =

Fancl Open in Okinawa
Tournament information
- Location: Itoman, Okinawa, Japan
- Established: 1982
- Course: Daikyo Country Club
- Par: 72
- Length: 6,798 yards (6,216 m)
- Tour: Japan Golf Tour
- Format: Stroke play
- Prize fund: ¥90,000,000
- Month played: December
- Final year: 2000

Tournament record score
- Aggregate: 263 Kenichi Kuboya (1997)
- To par: −21 as above

Final champion
- (Japan) Shingo Katayama
- Location in Japan Location in the Okinawa Prefecture

The Daikyo Open was a men's professional golf tournament that was held in Japan from 1982 until 2000. From 1983, it was an event on the Japan Golf Tour. It was played at Daikyo Country Club (later known as Palm Hills Golf Resort) in Itoman, Okinawa.

== Winners ==
Year	Winner	Score	To par	Margin of victory	Runner(s)-up	Ref.
Fancl Open in Okinawa
2000	(Japan) Shingo Katayama	277	−11	2 strokes	(Japan) Toru Taniguchi	
Fancl Okinawa Open
1999	(Japan) Taichi Teshima	271	−13	Playoff	(Japan) Seiki Okuda	
DDI Group Okinawa Open
1998	(Japan) Hidemichi Tanaka	273	−11	3 strokes	(Japan) Akihito Yokoyama	
Daikyo Open
1997	(Japan) Kenichi Kuboya	263	−21	1 stroke	(Japan) Katsunori Kuwabara (United States) Brian Watts	
1996	(Colombia) Eduardo Herrera	272	−12	5 strokes	(Japan) Katsunori Kuwabara	
1995	(Philippines) Frankie Miñoza	273	−11	2 strokes	(Japan) Tōru Nakamura	
1994	(Japan) Hideki Kase	268	−16	1 stroke	(Japan) Seiji Ebihara (Japan) Masahiro Kuramoto (Japan) Ken Kusumoto	
1993	(Japan) Tomohiro Maruyama	269	−15	3 strokes	(Japan) Ryoken Kawagishi (Japan) Nobuo Serizawa	
1992	(Japan) Masahiro Kuramoto	271	−13	4 strokes	(United States) David Ishii	
1991	(Japan) Hiroshi Makino	276	−8	1 stroke	(Canada) Brent Franklin (Japan) Seiki Okuda	
1990	(Japan) Teruo Sugihara	273	−15	1 stroke	(Japan) Seiki Okuda	
1989	(Japan) Nobuo Serizawa	271	−17	4 strokes	(United States) David Ishii	
1988	(Japan) Saburo Fujiki	274	−14	1 stroke	(Japan) Motomasa Aoki (United States) David Ishii (Australia) Graham Marsh	
1987	(Japan) Isamu Sugita	277	−7	Playoff	(Japan) Seiji Ebihara (Japan) Hiroshi Makino	
1986	(Japan) Tateo Ozaki	277	−7	Playoff	(Japan) Kikuo Arai	
1985	(Japan) Seiichi Kanai	274	−14	5 strokes	(Japan) Masahiro Kuramoto (Japan) Hisashi Suzumura (Japan) Tsukasa Watanabe	
1984	(Japan) Hiroshi Ishii	281	−7	1 stroke	(Japan) Masayuki Imai	
1983	(Japan) Masaji Kusakabe	278	−10	2 strokes	(Japan) Akio Toyoda	
1982	(Japan) Isao Aoki					
