= NST Niigata Open =

Sato Foods NST Niigata Open
Tournament information
- Location: Shibata, Niigata, Japan
- Established: 1979
- Course: Forest Golf Club
- Par: 71
- Length: 7,000 yards (6,400 m)
- Tour: Japan Golf Tour
- Format: Stroke play
- Prize fund: ¥100,000,000
- Month played: July
- Final year: 2004

Tournament record score
- Aggregate: 263 Kim Jong-duck (2004)
- To par: −24 Go Higaki (2001)

Final champion
- (South Korea) Kim Jong-duck
- Location in Japan Location in the Niigata Prefecture

The NST Niigata Open was a professional golf tournament that was held in Japan. It was a Japan Golf Tour event from at least 1981 to 2004. It was sponsored by Niigata Sogo Television and played on different courses in Niigata. The tournament record of 264(-24) was set in 2001 at Nakajo Golf Club.

== Winners ==
Year	Winner	Score	To par	Margin of victory	Runner(s)-up	Ref.
Sato Foods NST Niigata Open
2004	(South Korea) Kim Jong-duck	263	−21	5 strokes	(Japan) Kazuhiro Kinjo	
2003	(Japan) Katsumasa Miyamoto	271	−17	1 stroke	(United States) Gregory Meyer	
Sato Foods NST Niigata Open Golf Championship
2002	(Japan) Yasuharu Imano	270	−18	4 strokes	(Japan) Katsumasa Miyamoto	
NST Niigata Open Golf Championship
2001	(Japan) Go Higaki	264	−24	6 strokes	(Australia) Scott Laycock	
2000	(Japan) Hidezumi Shirakata	269	−19	4 strokes	(Japan) Kiyoshi Murota	
1999	(Japan) Toshimitsu Izawa	269	−19	6 strokes	(Japan) Kazuhiko Hosokawa	
1998	(Japan) Masayuki Kawamura	268	−20	8 strokes	(Japan) Shingo Katayama (Japan) Kiyoshi Murota	
1997	(Japan) Kazuhiko Hosokawa	277	−11	1 stroke	(Japan) Hisayuki Sasaki	
1996	(Japan) Masatoshi Horikawa	268	−20	1 stroke	(Japan) Masayuki Kawamura	
1995	(Japan) Tomohiro Maruyama	274	−14	3 strokes	(Japan) Hidemichi Tanaka	
NST Niigata Open
1994	(Japan) Pete Izumikawa	276	−12	2 strokes	(Japan) Kiyoshi Murota	
1993	(Japan) Kōki Idoki	275	−13	3 strokes	(Singapore) Samson Gimson (Japan) Hiroya Kamide (Japan) Yoshinori Kaneko (Japan) Hajime Meshiai	
1992	(Japan) Tsuneyuki Nakajima	275	−13	2 strokes	(Japan) Shigenori Mori	
1991	(Japan) Akihito Yokoyama	278	−10	2 strokes	(Japan) Hideki Kase (Japan) Koichi Suzuki	
1990	(Japan) Seiichi Kanai	278	−10	1 stroke	(Japan) Yukio Noguchi	
1989	(Japan) Katsuyoshi Tomori	288	E	1 stroke	(Japan) Tomohiro Maruyama	
1988	(Japan) Naomichi Ozaki	277	−11	3 strokes	(United States) David Ishii	
1987	(Japan) Tadao Nakamura	276	−8	1 stroke	(Taiwan) Hsieh Chin-sheng (United States) David Ishii (Australia) Brian Jones (Japan) Kazuo Yoshikawa	
1986	(United States) David Ishii	276	−12	1 stroke	(Japan) Tateo Ozaki	
1985	(Taiwan) Hsieh Min-Nan	272	−12	Playoff	(Japan) Yoshihisa Iwashita	
1984	(Japan) Saburo Fujiki	271	−13	1 stroke	(Japan) Haruo Yasuda	
Niigata Open
1983	(Japan) Hideto Shigenobu	136	−8	Playoff	(Japan) Isao Aoki (Japan) Katsunari Takahashi	
1982	(Japan) Yoshitaka Yamamoto	138	−6	Playoff	(Taiwan) Hsieh Min-Nan	
1981	(Japan) Takahiro Takeyasu	139	−5			
1980	(Japan) Hideo Ishii					
1979	(Japan) Koichi Uehara	106 (Note: Tournament contested over 27 holes.)				
