= 1991 PGA of Japan Tour =

Golf tour season

1991 PGA of Japan Tour season
- Duration: 7 March 1991 – 15 December 1991
- Number of official events: 43
- Most wins: (Japan) Naomichi Ozaki (4)
- Money list: (Japan) Naomichi Ozaki

The 1991 PGA of Japan Tour was the 19th season of the PGA of Japan Tour, the main professional golf tour in Japan since it was formed in 1973.

== Schedule ==
The following table lists official events during the 1991 season.

Date	Tournament	Location	Purse (¥)	Winner (Note: The number in brackets after each winner's name is the number of PGA of Japan Tour events they had won up to and including that tournament. This information is only shown for PGA of Japan Tour members.)	OWGR points	Other tours (Note: AGC − Asia Golf Circuit.)	Notes
10 Mar	Daiichi Fudosan Cup	Miyazaki	100,000,000	(Japan) Saburo Fujiki (12)	12		
17 Mar	Imperial Open	Ibaraki	65,000,000	(Japan) Yutaka Hagawa (4)	12		
24 Mar	Dydo Shizuoka Open	Shizuoka	80,000,000	(Japan) Yutaka Hagawa (5)	12		
31 Mar	KSB Open	Kagawa	60,000,000	(Japan) Masanobu Kimura (2)	12		
14 Apr	Pocari Sweat Open	Hiroshima	60,000,000	(Japan) Ryoken Kawagishi (4)	10		
21 Apr	Bridgestone Aso Open	Kumamoto	50,000,000	(Japan) Kiyoshi Murota (1)	10		
28 Apr	Dunlop Open	Ibaraki	100,000,000	(Australia) Roger Mackay (3)	20	AGC	
5 May	The Crowns	Aichi	120,000,000	(Spain) Seve Ballesteros (n/a)	20		
12 May	Fujisankei Classic	Shizuoka	87,500,000	(Japan) Saburo Fujiki (13)	14		
19 May	Japan PGA Match-Play Championship Unisys Cup	Gifu	50,000,000	(Japan) Satoshi Higashi (3)	12		
26 May	Ube Kosan Open	Yamaguchi	80,000,000	(Taiwan) Chen Tze-chung (3)	12		
2 Jun	Mitsubishi Galant Tournament	Ishikawa	85,000,000	(Japan) Koichi Suzuki (4)	12		
9 Jun	JCB Classic Sendai	Miyagi	70,000,000	(Japan) Tadami Ueno (7)	12		
16 Jun	Sapporo Tokyu Open	Hokkaidō	60,000,000	(Canada) Rick Gibson (1)	12		
23 Jun	Yomiuri Sapporo Beer Open	Hyōgo	80,000,000	(Japan) Tsuneyuki Nakajima (35)	12		
30 Jun	Mizuno Open	Ishikawa	65,000,000	(Australia) Roger Mackay (4)	10		
7 Jul	PGA Philanthropy Tournament	Chiba	100,000,000	(Japan) Harumitsu Hamano (1)	12		New tournament
14 Jul	Yonex Open Hiroshima	Hiroshima	70,000,000	(Japan) Eiichi Itai (1)	12		
28 Jul	Nikkei Cup	Fukuoka	80,000,000	(Japan) Naomichi Ozaki (15)	10		
4 Aug	NST Niigata Open	Niigata	60,000,000	(Japan) Akihito Yokoyama (3)	12		
18 Aug	Japan PGA Championship	Tochigi	100,000,000	(Japan) Masashi Ozaki (52)	12		
25 Aug	Maruman Open	Saitama	100,000,000	(Japan) Tetsu Nishikawa (1)	24		
1 Sep	Daiwa KBC Augusta	Fukuoka	100,000,000	(United States) Raymond Floyd (n/a)	12		
8 Sep	Kansai Open	Hyōgo	20,000,000	(Japan) Toshikazu Sugihara (1)	4		
8 Sep	Kanto Open	Kanagawa	30,000,000	(Japan) Yoshinori Kaneko (1)	4		
8 Sep	Chubu Open	Aichi	20,000,000	(Japan) Teruo Nakamura (3)	4		
8 Sep	Chushikoku Open	Ehime	20,000,000	(Japan) Kosei Miyata (1)	4		
8 Sep	Kyusyu Open	Kagoshima	20,000,000	(Japan) Kinpachi Yoshimura (4)	4		
8 Sep	Hokkaido Open	Hokkaidō	10,000,000	(Japan) Katsunari Takahashi (10)	4		
15 Sep	Suntory Open	Chiba	100,000,000	(Japan) Naomichi Ozaki (16)	14		
22 Sep	ANA Open	Hokkaidō	100,000,000	(Japan) Akiyoshi Ohmachi (4)	20		
29 Sep	Gene Sarazen Jun Classic	Tochigi	110,000,000	(Japan) Masashi Ozaki (53)	12		
6 Oct	Tokai Classic	Aichi	100,000,000	(Japan) Eiichi Itai (2)	12		
13 Oct	Japan Open Golf Championship	Yamaguchi	100,000,000	(Japan) Tsuneyuki Nakajima (36)	12		
20 Oct	Asahi Beer Golf Digest Tournament	Shizuoka	120,000,000	(Japan) Harumitsu Hamano (2)	24		
27 Oct	Bridgestone Open	Chiba	120,000,000	(Japan) Isao Aoki (49)	8		
3 Nov	ABC Lark Cup	Hyōgo	190,000,000	(Japan) Yoshikazu Yokoshima (6)	12		
10 Nov	Acom International	Chiba	100,000,000	(Japan) Masahiro Kuramoto (24)	12		
17 Nov	Visa Taiheiyo Club Masters	Shizuoka	150,000,000	(Australia) Roger Mackay (5)	42		
24 Nov	Dunlop Phoenix Tournament	Miyazaki	200,000,000	(United States) Larry Nelson (n/a)	42		
1 Dec	Casio World Open	Kagoshima	140,000,000	(Japan) Naomichi Ozaki (17)	20		
8 Dec	Golf Nippon Series Hitachi Cup	Tokyo	60,000,000	(Japan) Naomichi Ozaki (18)	12		
15 Dec	Daikyo Open	Okinawa	120,000,000	(Japan) Hiroshi Makino (2)	12		

== Money list ==
The money list was based on prize money won during the season, calculated in Japanese yen.

Position	Player	Prize money (¥)
1	(Japan) Naomichi Ozaki	119,507,974
2	(Australia) Roger Mackay	113,137,135
3	(Japan) Tsuneyuki Nakajima	111,639,213
4	(Japan) Masashi Ozaki	99,060,539
5	(Japan) Isao Aoki	74,237,850

== Japan Challenge Tour ==
1991 Japan Challenge Tour season
- Duration: 11 April 1991 – 21 November 1991
- Number of official events: 10
- Most wins: (Japan) Minoru Hatsumi (2)

The 1991 Japan Challenge Tour was the seventh season of the Japan Challenge Tour, the official development tour to the PGA of Japan Tour.

=== Schedule ===
The following table lists official events during the 1991 season.

Date	Tournament	Location	Purse (¥)	Winner (Note: The number in brackets after each winner's name is the number of Japan Challenge Tour events they had won up to and including that tournament. It is rare for someone to accumulate many wins on the Japan Challenge Tour as success at this level usually leads to promotion to the PGA of Japan Tour.)
12 Apr	Korakuen Cup (1st)	Tochigi	15,000,000	(Japan) Takeshi Matsukawa (1)
30 May	Kanto Kokusai Open	Tochigi	15,000,000	(Japan) Hisayuki Sasaki (1)
6 Jun	Mito Green Open	Ibaraki	15,000,000	(Japan) Kazunari Matsunaga (1)
20 Jun	Korakuen Cup (2nd)	Hokkaido	15,000,000	(Japan) Satoshi Furuyama (1)
3 Jul	Kanto PGA Philanthropy Takeda Cup	Shizuoka	15,000,000	(Japan) Kazushige Kono (1)
3 Jul	Kansai PGA Philanthropy Takeda Cup	Hyōgo	15,000,000	(Japan) Hisashi Terada (1)
10 Jul	Sports Shinko Open	Osaka	15,000,000	(Japan) Minoru Hatsumi (1)
26 Jul	Korakuen Cup (3rd)	Tochigi	15,000,000	(Japan) Minoru Hatsumi (2)
3 Oct	Korakuen Cup (4th)	Tochigi	15,000,000	(Japan) Fujio Kobayashi (1)
21 Nov	Korakuen Cup (5th)	Tochigi	15,000,000	(Japan) Osamu Machino (1)
