= 1992 PGA of Japan Tour =

Golf tour season

1992 PGA of Japan Tour season
- Duration: 5 March 1992 – 13 December 1992
- Number of official events: 38
- Most wins: (Japan) Masashi Ozaki (6)
- Money list: (Japan) Masashi Ozaki

The 1992 PGA of Japan Tour was the 20th season of the PGA of Japan Tour, the main professional golf tour in Japan since it was formed in 1973.

== Schedule ==
The following table lists official events during the 1992 season.

| Date | Tournament | Location | Purse (¥) | Winner (Note: The number in brackets after each winner's name is the number of PGA of Japan Tour events they had won up to and including that tournament. This information is only shown for PGA of Japan Tour members.) | OWGR points | Other tours (Note: AGC − Asia Golf Circuit.) | Notes |
|---|---|---|---|---|---|---|---|
| 8 Mar | Daiichi Cup | Miyazaki | 100,000,000 | (Taiwan) Chen Tze-ming (6) | 16 | | |
| 15 Mar | Imperial Open | Ibaraki | 65,000,000 | (Japan) Naomichi Ozaki (19) | 16 | | |
| 22 Mar | Dydo Shizuoka Open | Shizuoka | 80,000,000 | (Japan) Hiroshi Makino (3) | 16 | | |
| 29 Mar | TaylorMade KSB Open | Okayama | 70,000,000 | (Japan) Seiki Okuda (2) | 16 | | |
| 5 Apr | Descente Classic | Hyōgo | 70,000,000 | (Japan) Yoshinori Kaneko (2) | 16 | | New tournament |
| 12 Apr | Pocari Sweat Open | Hiroshima | 80,000,000 | (Taiwan) Chen Tze-ming (7) | 16 | | |
| 19 Apr | Bridgestone Aso Open | Kumamoto | 70,000,000 | (Australia) Peter Senior (1) | 16 | | |
| 26 Apr | Dunlop Open | Ibaraki | 100,000,000 | (Japan) Masashi Ozaki (54) | 28 | AGC | |
| 3 May | The Crowns | Aichi | 120,000,000 | (Japan) Masashi Ozaki (55) | 32 | | |
| 10 May | Fujisankei Classic | Shizuoka | 120,000,000 | (Japan) Hiroshi Makino (4) | 18 | | |
| 17 May | Japan PGA Championship | Gunma | 100,000,000 | (Japan) Masahiro Kuramoto (25) | 16 | | |
| 24 May | Pepsi Ube Kosan Open | Yamaguchi | 80,000,000 | (Japan) Tsuneyuki Nakajima (37) | 16 | | |
| 31 May | Mitsubishi Galant Tournament | Iwate | 100,000,000 | (Japan) Isao Aoki (50) | 16 | | |
| 7 Jun | JCB Classic Sendai | Miyagi | 85,000,000 | (Australia) Roger Mackay (6) | 16 | | |
| 14 Jun | Sapporo Tokyu Open | Hokkaidō | 100,000,000 | (Japan) Nobumitsu Yuhara (5) | 16 | | |
| 21 Jun | Yomiuri Sapporo Beer Open | Hyōgo | 80,000,000 | (United States) David Ishii (11) | 16 | | |
| 28 Jun | Mizuno Open | Ishikawa | 90,000,000 | (Japan) Tōru Nakamura (20) | 16 | | |
| 5 Jul | PGA Philanthropy Tournament | Chiba | 100,000,000 | (Japan) Masashi Ozaki (56) | 16 | | |
| 12 Jul | Yonex Open Hiroshima | Hiroshima | 80,000,000 | (Japan) Nobumitsu Yuhara (6) | 16 | | |
| 26 Jul | Nikkei Cup | Hokkaidō | 80,000,000 | (Japan) Kiyoshi Murota (2) | 16 | | |
| 2 Aug | NST Niigata Open | Niigata | 60,000,000 | (Japan) Tsuneyuki Nakajima (38) | 16 | | |
| 16 Aug | Acom International | Shiga | 100,000,000 | (Japan) Hisao Inoue (1) | 16 | | |
| 23 Aug | Maruman Open | Saitama | 100,000,000 | (United States) Todd Hamilton (1) | 16 | | |
| 30 Aug | Daiwa KBC Augusta | Fukuoka | 100,000,000 | (Taiwan) Chen Tze-ming (8) | 16 | | |
| 6 Sep | Japan PGA Match-Play Championship Promise Cup | Tochigi | 80,000,000 | (Japan) Tsuneyuki Nakajima (39) | 16 | | |
| 13 Sep | Suntory Open | Chiba | 100,000,000 | (Japan) Naomichi Ozaki (20) | 16 | | |
| 20 Sep | ANA Open | Hokkaidō | 100,000,000 | (Japan) Masashi Ozaki (57) | 24 | | |
| 27 Sep | Gene Sarazen Jun Classic | Tochigi | 110,000,000 | (Taiwan) Chen Tze-chung (4) | 16 | | |
| 4 Oct | Tokai Classic | Aichi | 110,000,000 | (United States) Mark O'Meara (n/a) | 20 | | |
| 11 Oct | Japan Open Golf Championship | Ibaraki | 100,000,000 | (Japan) Masashi Ozaki (58) | 32 | | Flagship event |
| 18 Oct | Asahi Beer Golf Digest Tournament | Shizuoka | 150,000,000 | (Japan) Seiki Okuda (3) | 18 | | |
| 25 Oct | Bridgestone Open | Chiba | 120,000,000 | (Japan) Masahiro Kuramoto (26) | 34 | | |
| 1 Nov | Lark Cup | Hyōgo | 200,000,000 | (Japan) Naomichi Ozaki (21) | 18 | | |
| 15 Nov | Visa Taiheiyo Club Masters | Shizuoka | 150,000,000 | (Japan) Masashi Ozaki (59) | 42 | | |
| 22 Nov | Dunlop Phoenix Tournament | Miyazaki | 200,000,000 | (South Africa) David Frost (n/a) | 38 | | |
| 29 Nov | Casio World Open | Kagoshima | 150,000,000 | (Japan) Isao Aoki (51) | 20 | | |
| 6 Dec | Golf Nippon Series Hitachi Cup | Hyōgo | 60,000,000 | (Taiwan) Chen Tze-ming (9) | 16 | | |
| 13 Dec | Daikyo Open | Okinawa | 120,000,000 | (Japan) Masahiro Kuramoto (27) | 16 | | |

== Money list ==
The money list was based on prize money won during the season, calculated in Japanese yen.

| Position | Player | Prize money (¥) |
|---|---|---|
| 1 | (Japan) Masashi Ozaki | 186,816,466 |
| 2 | (Japan) Naomichi Ozaki | 130,880,179 |
| 3 | (Taiwan) Chen Tze-ming | 122,317,851 |
| 4 | (Japan) Masahiro Kuramoto | 116,361,950 |
| 5 | (Japan) Tsuneyuki Nakajima | 108,674,116 |

== Japan Challenge Tour ==
1992 Japan Challenge Tour season
- Duration: 9 April 1992 – 19 November 1992
- Number of official events: 10
- Most wins: (Japan) Hiroshi Gohda (2) (Japan) Hisayuki Sasaki (2)

The 1992 Japan Challenge Tour was the eighth season of the Japan Challenge Tour, the official development tour to the PGA of Japan Tour.

=== Schedule ===
The following table lists official events during the 1992 season.

| Date | Tournament | Location | Purse (¥) | Winner (Note: The number in brackets after each winner's name is the number of Japan Challenge Tour events they had won up to and including that tournament. It is rare for someone to accumulate many wins on the Japan Challenge Tour as success at this level usually leads to promotion to the PGA of Japan Tour.) |
|---|---|---|---|---|
| 10 Apr | Korakuen Cup (1st) | Tochigi | 15,000,000 | (Japan) Hiroshi Gohda (2) |
| 28 May | Kanto Kokusai Open | Tochigi | 15,000,000 | (Japan) Hisayuki Sasaki (2) |
| 4 Jun | Mito Green Open | Ibaraki | 15,000,000 | (Japan) Motoi Nakamura (1) |
| 18 Jun | Korakuen Cup (2nd) | Hokkaido | 15,000,000 | (Japan) Hisayuki Sasaki (3) |
| 1 Jul | Kanto PGA Philanthropy | Tochigi | 15,000,000 | (Japan) Hiroshi Ueda (1) |
| 1 Jul | Kansai PGA Philanthropy | Hiroshima | 15,000,000 | (Japan) Naoya Sugiyama (1) |
| 8 Jul | Sports Shinko Open | Hyōgo | 15,000,000 | (Japan) Hiroshi Gohda (3) |
| 31 Jul | Korakuen Cup (3rd) | Tochigi | 15,000,000 | (Japan) Yukio Noguchi (1) |
| 23 Oct | Korakuen Cup (4th) | Tochigi | 15,000,000 | (Japan) Katsunori Kuwabara (1) |
| 19 Nov | Korakuen Cup (5th) | Tochigi | 15,000,000 | (Japan) Yukio Noguchi (2) |
