= 1995 PGA of Japan Tour =

Golf tour season

1995 PGA of Japan Tour season
- Duration: 9 March 1995 – 10 December 1995
- Number of official events: 37
- Most wins: (Japan) Masashi Ozaki (5)
- Money list: (Japan) Masashi Ozaki

The 1995 PGA of Japan Tour was the 23rd season of the PGA of Japan Tour, the main professional golf tour in Japan since it was formed in 1973.

== Schedule ==
The following table lists official events during the 1995 season.

Date	Tournament	Location	Purse (¥)	Winner (Note: The number in brackets after each winner's name is the number of PGA of Japan Tour events they had won up to and including that tournament. This information is only shown for PGA of Japan Tour members.)	OWGR points	Other tours (Note: AGC − Asia Golf Circuit.)	Notes
12 Mar	Token Corporation Cup	Kagoshima	100,000,000	(United States) Todd Hamilton (5)	20		
19 Mar	Dydo Drinco Shizuoka Open	Shizuoka	100,000,000	(United States) Brian Watts (6)	16		
26 Mar	Novell KSB Open	Okayama	70,000,000	(Canada) Rick Gibson (2)	16		
2 Apr	Descente Classic Munsingwear Cup	Hyōgo	80,000,000	(Japan) Satoshi Higashi (4)	16		
16 Apr	Tsuruya Open	Hyōgo	100,000,000	(Japan) Satoshi Higashi (5)	16		
23 Apr	Dunlop Open	Ibaraki	90,000,000	(Australia) Peter Senior (3)	20	AGC	
30 Apr	The Crowns	Aichi	120,000,000	(Japan) Masashi Ozaki (70)	22		
7 May	Fujisankei Classic	Shizuoka	120,000,000	(Japan) Tsuneyuki Nakajima (45)	18		
14 May	Japan PGA Championship	Aomori	100,000,000	(Japan) Hisayuki Sasaki (2)	16		
21 May	Pepsi Ube Kosan Open	Yamaguchi	80,000,000	(Japan) Mitsutaka Kusakabe (1)	16		
28 May	Mitsubishi Galant Tournament	Kumamoto	100,000,000	(United States) Brandt Jobe (1)	18		
4 Jun	JCB Classic Sendai	Miyagi	100,000,000	(Japan) Ryoken Kawagishi (5)	16		
11 Jun	Sapporo Tokyu Open	Hokkaidō	100,000,000	(Paraguay) Carlos Franco (2)	16		
18 Jun	Pocari Sweat Yomiuri Open	Hyōgo	100,000,000	(Colombia) Eduardo Herrera (1)	16		
25 Jun	Mizuno Open	Ishikawa	100,000,000	(United States) Brian Watts (7)	16		
2 Jul	PGA Philanthropy Tournament	Ishikawa	100,000,000	(Japan) Kazuhiro Takami (2)	18		
9 Jul	Yonex Open Hiroshima	Hiroshima	80,000,000	(Japan) Masashi Ozaki (71)	16		
16 Jul	Nikkei Cup Torakichi Nakamura Memorial	Ibaraki	100,000,000	(Japan) Tetsu Nishikawa (3)	16		
30 Jul	NST Niigata Open Golf Championship	Niigata	60,000,000	(Japan) Tomohiro Maruyama (3)	16		
6 Aug	Sanko Grand Summer Championship	Gunma	100,000,000	(Philippines) Frankie Miñoza (3)	16		
20 Aug	Acom International	Ibaraki	100,000,000	(Japan) Katsunori Kuwabara (1)	16		
27 Aug	Hisamitsu-KBC Augusta	Fukuoka	100,000,000	(Japan) Kazuhiko Hosokawa (1)	16		
3 Sep	Japan PGA Match-Play Championship Promise Cup	Hokkaidō	70,000,000	(Japan) Katsuyoshi Tomori (6)	16		
10 Sep	Suntory Open	Chiba	90,000,000	(Japan) Masahiro Kuramoto (29)	24		
17 Sep	ANA Open	Hokkaidō	100,000,000	(Japan) Masashi Ozaki (72)	26		
24 Sep	Gene Sarazen Jun Classic	Tochigi	110,000,000	(Japan) Satoshi Higashi (6)	18		
1 Oct	Japan Open Golf Championship	Saitama	100,000,000	(Japan) Toshimitsu Izawa (1)	32		Flagship event
8 Oct	Tokai Classic	Aichi	110,000,000	(Japan) Masayuki Kawamura (1)	18		
15 Oct	Golf Digest Tournament	Shizuoka	100,000,000	(Australia) Stewart Ginn (1)	16		
22 Oct	Bridgestone Open	Chiba	120,000,000	(Japan) Shigeki Maruyama (2)	20		
29 Oct	Philip Morris Championship	Hyōgo	200,000,000	(Japan) Hidemichi Tanaka (1)	22		
5 Nov	Daiwa International	Yamanashi	170,000,000	(Japan) Shigenori Mori (1)	20		
12 Nov	Sumitomo Visa Taiheiyo Masters	Shizuoka	150,000,000	(Japan) Satoshi Higashi (7)	40		
19 Nov	Dunlop Phoenix Tournament	Miyazaki	200,000,000	(Japan) Masashi Ozaki (73)	40		
26 Nov	Casio World Open	Kagoshima	150,000,000	(Japan) Seiki Okuda (6)	30		
3 Dec	Golf Nippon Series Hitachi Cup	Tokyo	100,000,000	(Japan) Masashi Ozaki (74)	18		
10 Dec	Daikyo Open	Okinawa	120,000,000	(Philippines) Frankie Miñoza (4)	16		

== Money list ==
The money list was based on prize money won during the season, calculated in Japanese yen.

Position	Player	Prize money (¥)
1	(Japan) Masashi Ozaki	192,319,800
2	(Japan) Satoshi Higashi	136,854,183
3	(Japan) Shigeki Maruyama	103,209,036
4	(Japan) Masahiro Kuramoto	88,227,209
5	(Japan) Katsuyoshi Tomori	86,693,831

== Japan Challenge Tour ==
1995 Japan Challenge Tour season
- Duration: 12 April 1995 – 16 November 1995
- Number of official events: 11
- Most wins: (Japan) Yasunobu Kuramoto (2) (Japan) Hidemichi Tanaka (2) (Japan) Taichi Teshima (2)

The 1995 Japan Challenge Tour was the 11th season of the Japan Challenge Tour, the official development tour to the PGA of Japan Tour.

=== Schedule ===
The following table lists official events during the 1995 season.

Date	Tournament	Location	Purse (¥)	Winner (Note: The number in brackets after each winner's name is the number of Japan Challenge Tour events they had won up to and including that tournament. It is rare for someone to accumulate many wins on the Japan Challenge Tour as success at this level usually leads to promotion to the PGA of Japan Tour.)
13 Apr	Sanko 72 Open	Gunma	10,000,000	(Japan) Taichi Teshima (1)
20 Apr	Korakuen Cup (1st)	Gunma	10,000,000	(Japan) Gohei Sato (2)
25 May	Kanto Kokusai Open	Tochigi	10,000,000	(Japan) Yasunobu Kuramoto (1)
1 Jun	Mito Green Open	Ibaraki	10,000,000	(Japan) Hidemichi Tanaka (1)
14 Jun	Kanto PGA Philanthropy	Tochigi	10,000,000	(Japan) Kazuhiro Fukunaga (2)
22 Jun	Kansai PGA Philanthropy	Fukui	10,000,000	(Japan) Kosaku Makisaka (1)
5 Jul	Korakuen Cup (2nd)	Hokkaido	10,000,000	(Japan) Hidemichi Tanaka (2)
7 Sep	Korakuen Cup (3rd)	Tochigi	10,000,000	(Japan) Yoshikatsu Saito (1)
28 Sep	Matsugamine Open	Niigata	10,000,000	(Japan) Yasunobu Kuramoto (2)
5 Oct	Korakuen Cup (4th)	Oita	10,000,000	(Japan) Taichi Teshima (2)
16 Nov	Korakuen Cup (5th)	Tochigi	10,000,000	(Japan) Shingo Katayama (2)
