= Hiroshi Gohda =

Japanese golfer

Personal information
- Nationality: Japan
- Born: 10 October 1964 (age 62) Hyōgo Prefecture, Japan
- Height: 1.78 m (5 ft 10 in)
- Weight: 80 kg (180 lb; 13 st)

Career
- Sport: Golf
- Status: Professional
- Former tour: Japan Golf Tour
- Professional wins: 4

Number of wins by tour
- Japan Golf Tour: 1
- Other: 3

Best results in major championships
- Masters Tournament: DNP
- PGA Championship: DNP
- U.S. Open: DNP
- The Open Championship: CUT: 1994

Hiroshi Gohda (born 10 October 1964) is a Japanese professional golfer.

== Career ==
Gohda played on the Japan Golf Tour, winning once.

== Professional wins (4) ==
=== PGA of Japan Tour wins (1) ===
No.	Date	Tournament	Winning score	Margin of victory	Runner-up
1	15 May 1994	Japan PGA Championship	−5 (66-73-67-73=279)	1 stroke	(Japan) Masashi Ozaki

=== Japan Challenge Tour wins (3) ===
- 1987 Mito Green Open
- 1992 Korakuen Cup (1st), Sports Shinko Open

== Results in major championships ==
Tournament	1994
The Open Championship	CUT

CUT = missed the half-way cut
Note: Gohda only played in The Open Championship.

== Team appearances ==
- World Cup (representing Japan): 1995
