= Daiwa International =

Tournament information
- Location: Japan
- Established: 1993
- Tour: Japan Golf Tour
- Format: Stroke play
- Prize fund: ¥170,000,000
- Month played: November
- Final year: 1995

Tournament record score
- Aggregate: 270 Masashi Ozaki (1994)
- To par: −18 as above

Final champion
- (Japan) Shigenori Mori

The Daiwa International was a professional golf tournament that was held in Japan from 1993 to 1995. It was an event on the Japan Golf Tour, and played in November at a different course each year.

== Winners ==
| Year | Winner | Score | To par | Margin of victory | Runner(s)-up | Venue |
|---|---|---|---|---|---|---|
| 1995 | (Japan) Shigenori Mori | 280 | −8 | 1 stroke | (United States) David Ishii (Japan) Hisayuki Sasaki | Daiwa Vintage |
| 1994 | (Japan) Masashi Ozaki | 270 | −18 | 15 strokes | (United States) Fuzzy Zoeller | Hatoyama |
| 1993 | (Japan) Tsukasa Watanabe | 274 | −10 | 1 stroke | (Taiwan) Chen Tze-chung (United States) Tom Kite | Higashi Tsukuba |
