= 1994 PGA of Japan Tour =

Golf tour season

1994 PGA of Japan Tour season
- Duration: 10 March 1994 – 11 December 1994
- Number of official events: 38
- Most wins: (Japan) Masashi Ozaki (7)
- Money list: (Japan) Masashi Ozaki

The 1994 PGA of Japan Tour was the 22nd season of the PGA of Japan Tour, the main professional golf tour in Japan since it was formed in 1973.

== Schedule ==
The following table lists official events during the 1994 season.

Date	Tournament	Location	Purse (¥)	Winner (Note: The number in brackets after each winner's name is the number of PGA of Japan Tour events they had won up to and including that tournament. This information is only shown for PGA of Japan Tour members.)	OWGR points	Other tours (Note: AGC − Asia Golf Circuit.)	Notes
13 Mar	Token Cup	Kagoshima	100,000,000	(Australia) Craig Warren (1)	16		
20 Mar	Dydo Shizuoka Open	Shizuoka	100,000,000	(Japan) Tsuneyuki Nakajima (42)	16		
27 Mar	United KSB Open	Okayama	70,000,000	(Japan) Kazuhiro Takami (1)	16		
3 Apr	Descente Classic	Hyōgo	80,000,000	(United States) Brian Watts (1)	16		
10 Apr	Pocari Sweat Open	Hiroshima	80,000,000	(Japan) Yoshi Mizumaki (3)	16		
17 Apr	Tsuruya Open	Hyōgo	100,000,000	(Japan) Tsuneyuki Nakajima (43)	16		New tournament
24 Apr	Dunlop Open	Ibaraki	100,000,000	(Japan) Masashi Ozaki (63)	20	AGC	
1 May	The Crowns	Aichi	120,000,000	(Australia) Roger Mackay (8)	28		
8 May	Fujisankei Classic	Shizuoka	120,000,000	(Japan) Kiyoshi Murota (3)	16		
15 May	Japan PGA Championship	Gifu	100,000,000	(Japan) Hiroshi Gohda (1)	18		
22 May	Pepsi Ube Kosan Open	Yamaguchi	80,000,000	(Japan) Tsuneyuki Nakajima (44)	16		
29 May	Mitsubishi Galant Tournament	Hokkaidō	100,000,000	(Japan) Katsuyoshi Tomori (5)	16		
5 Jun	JCB Classic Sendai	Miyagi	100,000,000	(Japan) Masahiro Kuramoto (28)	18		
12 Jun	Sapporo Tokyu Open	Hokkaidō	100,000,000	(Japan) Yoshi Mizumaki (4)	16		
19 Jun	Yomiuri Open	Hyōgo	100,000,000	(Japan) Tsukasa Watanabe (2)	16		
26 Jun	Mizuno Open	Ishikawa	100,000,000	(United States) Brian Watts (2)	16		
3 Jul	PGA Philanthropy Tournament	Hyōgo	100,000,000	(United States) Todd Hamilton (3)	16		
10 Jul	Yonex Open Hiroshima	Hiroshima	80,000,000	(Japan) Masashi Ozaki (64)	16		
24 Jul	Nikkei Cup	Hokkaidō	80,000,000	(Japan) Toru Suzuki (2)	16		
31 Jul	NST Niigata Open	Niigata	60,000,000	(Japan) Pete Izumikawa (4)	16		
14 Aug	Acom International	Ibaraki	100,000,000	(Japan) Naomichi Ozaki (22)	16		
21 Aug	Maruman Open	Chiba	120,000,000	(United States) David Ishii (13)	16		
28 Aug	Hisamitsu-KBC Augusta	Fukuoka	100,000,000	(United States) Brian Watts (3)	16		
4 Sep	Japan PGA Match-Play Championship Promise Cup	Hokkaidō	70,000,000	(United States) Todd Hamilton (4)	16		
11 Sep	Suntory Open	Chiba	100,000,000	(United States) David Ishii (14)	20		
18 Sep	ANA Open	Hokkaidō	100,000,000	(Japan) Masashi Ozaki (65)	20		
25 Sep	Gene Sarazen Jun Classic	Tochigi	110,000,000	(Paraguay) Carlos Franco (1)	18		
2 Oct	Japan Open Golf Championship	Mie	100,000,000	(Japan) Masashi Ozaki (66)	32		Flagship event
9 Oct	Tokai Classic	Aichi	110,000,000	(United States) Corey Pavin (n/a)	24		
16 Oct	Asahi Beer Golf Digest Tournament	Shizuoka	150,000,000	(Japan) Eiji Mizoguchi (1)	20		
23 Oct	Bridgestone Open	Chiba	120,000,000	(United States) Brian Watts (4)	30		
30 Oct	Philip Morris Championship	Hyōgo	200,000,000	(United States) Brian Watts (5)	20		
6 Nov	Daiwa International	Saitama	170,000,000	(Japan) Masashi Ozaki (67)	24		
13 Nov	Sumitomo Visa Taiheiyo Masters	Shizuoka	150,000,000	(Japan) Masashi Ozaki (68)	32		
20 Nov	Dunlop Phoenix Tournament	Miyazaki	200,000,000	(Japan) Masashi Ozaki (69)	34		
27 Nov	Casio World Open	Kagoshima	150,000,000	(United States) Robert Gamez (n/a)	28		
4 Dec	Golf Nippon Series Hitachi Cup	Hyōgo	100,000,000	(Japan) Hisayuki Sasaki (1)	16		
11 Dec	Daikyo Open	Okinawa	120,000,000	(Japan) Hideki Kase (2)	16		

== Money list ==
The money list was based on prize money won during the season, calculated in Japanese yen.

Position	Player	Prize money (¥)
1	(Japan) Masashi Ozaki	215,468,000
2	(United States) Brian Watts	139,052,710
3	(Japan) Tsuneyuki Nakajima	115,771,280
4	(Japan) Naomichi Ozaki	91,685,057
5	(United States) David Ishii	87,271,410

== Japan Challenge Tour ==
1994 Japan Challenge Tour season
- Duration: 21 April 1994 – 17 November 1994
- Number of official events: 9
- Most wins: (Japan) Toru Nakayama (2)

The 1994 Japan Challenge Tour was the 10th season of the Japan Challenge Tour, the official development tour to the PGA of Japan Tour.

=== Schedule ===
The following table lists official events during the 1994 season.

Date	Tournament	Location	Purse (¥)	Winner (Note: The number in brackets after each winner's name is the number of Japan Challenge Tour events they had won up to and including that tournament. It is rare for someone to accumulate many wins on the Japan Challenge Tour as success at this level usually leads to promotion to the PGA of Japan Tour.)
21 Apr	Korakuen Cup (1st)	Tochigi	10,000,000	(Japan) Kazuhiko Hosokawa (1)
26 May	Kanto Kokusai Open	Tochigi	10,000,000	(Japan) Koji Mitake (1)
2 Jun	Mito Green Open	Ibaraki	10,000,000	(Japan) Masami Ito (1)
29 Jun	Kansai PGA Philanthropy	Fukui	10,000,000	(Japan) Hidezumi Shirakata (1)
1 Jul	Kanto PGA Philanthropy	Tochigi	10,000,000	(Japan) Taisuke Kitajima (1)
28 Jul	Korakuen Cup (2nd)	Hokkaido	10,000,000	(Japan) Toru Nakayama (1)
8 Sep	Korakuen Cup (3rd)	Tochigi	10,000,000	(Japan) Yoshikazu Sakamoto (1)
13 Oct	Korakuen Cup (4th)	Oita	10,000,000	(Japan) Toru Nakayama (2)
17 Nov	Korakuen Cup (5th)	Tochigi	10,000,000	(Japan) Yoshio Fumiyama (1)
