= Katsumasa Miyamoto =

Japanese professional golfer (born 1972)

Katsumasa Miyamoto 宮本勝昌
Personal information
- Nationality: Japan
- Born: 28 August 1972 (age 54) Shizuoka Prefecture, Japan
- Height: 1.74 m (5 ft 9 in)
- Weight: 76 kg (168 lb; 12.0 st)

Career
- Sport: Golf
- Turned professional: 1995
- Current tour: Japan PGA Senior Tour
- Former tour: Japan Golf Tour
- Professional wins: 23
- Highest ranking: 89 (23 December 2001)

Number of wins by tour
- Japan Golf Tour: 12
- Other: 11

Best results in major championships
- Masters Tournament: DNP
- PGA Championship: DNP
- U.S. Open: DNP
- The Open Championship: CUT: 2010

Achievements and awards
- Japan PGA Senior Tour Order of Merit winner: 2023

Katsumasa Miyamoto (Japanese: 宮本勝昌, born 28 August 1972) is a Japanese professional golfer.

== Career ==
Miyamoto was born in Shizuoka Prefecture. After turning professional, he joined the Japan Golf Tour, where he has won 12 times. He won his first title in 1998, adding another later that year. He added two more wins in 2001 and 2014 and one win in 2003, 2007, 2008, 2010, 2017 and 2019.

== Professional wins (23) ==
=== Japan Golf Tour wins (12) ===
Legend
Japan majors (4)
Other Japan Golf Tour (8)

| No. | Date | Tournament | Winning score | Margin of victory | Runner(s)-up |
|---|---|---|---|---|---|
| 1 | 19 Apr 1998 | Tsuruya Open | −17 (69-65-69-68=271) | 1 stroke | (Australia) Peter McWhinney |
| 2 | 6 Dec 1998 | Golf Nippon Series JT Cup | −5 (64-67-75-69=275) | Playoff | (Japan) Masashi Ozaki |
| 3 | 1 Jul 2001 | Japan Golf Tour Championship iiyama Cup | −15 (69-67-68-69=273) | 7 strokes | (Colombia) Eduardo Herrera, (India) Jeev Milkha Singh |
| 4 | 2 Dec 2001 | Golf Nippon Series JT Cup (2) | −12 (72-64-66-66=268) | 1 stroke | (Japan) Toshimitsu Izawa, (Japan) Tsuneyuki Nakajima |
| 5 | 27 Jul 2003 | Sato Foods NST Niigata Open | −17 (65-71-69-66=271) | 1 stroke | (United States) Gregory Meyer |
| 6 | 26 Aug 2007 | KBC Augusta | −15 (64-64-70-71=269) | 1 stroke | (Australia) Steven Conran, (Japan) Koumei Oda |
| 7 | 20 Apr 2008 | Token Homemate Cup | −8 (71-66-73-66=276) | 1 stroke | (Japan) Taichi Teshima |
| 8 | 6 Jun 2010 | Japan Golf Tour Championship Citibank Cup Shishido Hills (2) | −5 (69-67-68-75=279) | 3 strokes | (Japan) Hiroyuki Fujita |
| 9 | 21 Sep 2014 | ANA Open | −18 (68-67-68-67=270) | Playoff | (Japan) Hideto Tanihara |
| 10 | 7 Dec 2014 | Golf Nippon Series JT Cup (3) | −9 (68-67-71-65=271) | 1 stroke | (Thailand) Prayad Marksaeng |
| 11 | 30 Jul 2017 | Dunlop Srixon Fukushima Open | −22 (66-68-69-63=266) | 1 stroke | (South Korea) Hur In-hoi |
| 12 | 5 May 2019 | The Crowns | −9 (66-69-67-69=271) | 1 stroke | (Japan) Shugo Imahira |

Japan Golf Tour playoff record (2–3)

| No. | Year | Tournament | Opponent(s) | Result |
|---|---|---|---|---|
| 1 | 1998 | Golf Nippon Series JT Cup | (Japan) Masashi Ozaki | Won with birdie on fourth extra hole |
| 2 | 2003 | Aiful Cup | (Japan) Taichi Teshima | Lost to birdie on first extra hole |
| 3 | 2003 | Acom International | (Japan) Masahiro Kuramoto, (Japan) Masashi Ozaki | Kuramoto won with birdie on first extra hole |
| 4 | 2014 | ANA Open | (Japan) Hideto Tanihara | Won with par on first extra hole |
| 5 | 2017 | Panasonic Open Golf Championship | (Japan) Kenichi Kuboya | Lost after concession on first extra hole |

=== Other wins (1) ===
- 2008 Hitachi 3Tours Championship

=== Japan PGA Senior Tour wins (10) ===
| No. | Date | Tournament | Winning score | Margin of victory | Runner-up |
|---|---|---|---|---|---|
| 1 | 20 Aug 2023 | Fancl Classic | −14 (69-68-65=202) | 3 strokes | (Japan) Kazuhiko Hosokawa |
| 2 | 29 Oct 2023 | Fukuoka Senior Open | −12 (70-62=132) | Playoff | (Japan) Shingo Katayama |
| 3 | 26 Nov 2023 | Iwasaki Shiratsuyu Senior Golf Tournament | −9 (72-66-69=207) | 1 stroke | (Japan) Toru Suzuki |
| 4 | 16 Jun 2024 | Starts Senior Golf Tournament | −21 (66-65-64=195) | 6 strokes | (Japan) Takashi Kanemoto |
| 5 | 15 Aug 2024 | Masahiro Kuramoto Invitational Eagle Cup Senior Charity Open | −13 (68-63=131) | 4 strokes | (Japan) Shingo Katayama |
| 6 | 20 Oct 2024 | Fancl Classic | −13 (69-69-68=203) | 4 strokes | (Japan) Shingo Katayama, (Japan) Yuichi Ota |
| 7 | 31 May 2025 | Sumaiida Cup Senior Golf Tournament | −14 (70-62-70=202) | 4 strokes | (South Korea) Choi Ho-sung, (Japan) Hiroaki Iijima, (Thailand) Prayad Marksaeng |
| 8 | 26 Jul 2025 | Masahiro Kuramoto Invitational Eagle Cup Senior Charity Open | −12 (64-68=132) | 1 stroke | (Japan) Fumihiro Ebine |
| 9 | 4 Oct 2025 | Komatsu Open | −17 (64-70-65=199) | 4 strokes | (Japan) Hiroaki Iijima |
| 10 | 9 Nov 2025 | Cosmo Health Cup Senior | −7 (67-70=137) | Playoff | (Malaysia) Danny Chia, (Japan) Norihiko Furusho, (Japan) Taichi Teshima |

== Results in major championships ==
| Tournament | 2010 |
|---|---|
| The Open Championship | CUT |

Note: Miyamoto only played in The Open Championship.
CUT = missed the half-way cut

== Results in World Golf Championships ==
| Tournament | 2010 |
|---|---|
| Match Play | |
| Championship | |
| Invitational | T33 |
| Champions | T34 |

Did not play

"T" = Tied

== Team appearances ==
Amateur

- Eisenhower Trophy (representing Japan): 1992, 1994

Professional

- Alfred Dunhill Cup (representing Japan): 1998
- Dynasty Cup (representing Japan): 2003, 2005

== See also ==
- 1998 PGA Tour Qualifying School graduates
- List of golfers with most Japan Golf Tour wins
