= Yomiuri Open =

Japanese professional golf tournament (1970-2006)

Mandom Lucido Yomiuri Open
Tournament information
- Location: Nishinomiya, Hyōgo, Japan
- Established: 1970
- Course: Yomiuri Country Club
- Par: 72
- Length: 7,161 yards (6,548 m)
- Tour: Japan Golf Tour
- Format: Stroke play
- Prize fund: ¥100,000,000
- Month played: June
- Final year: 2006

Tournament record score
- Aggregate: 266 Kazuhiro Fukunaga (1996); 266 Todd Hamilton (1996)
- To par: −20 Dinesh Chand (2004)

Final champion
- (Japan) Nobuhiro Masuda
- Location in Japan Location in the Hyogo Prefecture

The Yomiuri Open was a professional golf tournament on the Japan Golf Tour. Founded in 1970 as the Wizard Tournament, a 36-hole invitational tournament, it was played at Hashimoto Country Club in Wakayama until 1979 when it moved to Yomiuri Country Club in Hyōgo. With the move, it also became a full 72-hole tour event, having been extended to 54 holes in 1976, and adopted its new name. It remained at Yomiuri every year except for 1996, when it was played at Wakasu Golf Links in Tokyo. In 2007 it merged with the Mizuno Open to form the Gateway to the Open Mizuno Open Yomiuri Classic.

== Tournament hosts ==
Year(s)	Host course	Location
1979–1995, 1997–2006	Yomiuri Country Club	Nishinomiya, Hyōgo
1996	Wakasu Golf Links	Kōtō, Tokyo
1970–1978	Hashimoto Country Club	Hashimoto, Wakayama

== Winners ==
Year	Winner	Score	To par	Margin of victory	Runner(s)-up	Ref.
Mandom Lucido Yomiuri Open
2006	(Japan) Nobuhiro Masuda	274	−14	1 stroke	(South Korea) Yang Yong-eun	
2005	(Japan) Satoru Hirota	270	−18	1 stroke	(Japan) Shinichi Akiba (Japan) Tetsuji Hiratsuka	
2004	(Fiji) Dinesh Chand	268	−20	4 strokes	(Japan) Tetsuji Hiratsuka (South Korea) Hur Suk-ho	
2003	(Japan) Hideto Tanihara	200 (Note: Shortened to 54 holes due to weather.)	−16	3 strokes	(Japan) Nobuhito Sato	
Tamanoi Yomiuri Open
2002	(Japan) Toru Taniguchi	270	−18	2 strokes	(Japan) Satoru Hirota (Japan) Daisuke Maruyama	
2001	(Japan) Yoshimitsu Fukuzawa	272	−16	Playoff	(Japan) Toru Suzuki	
2000	(Japan) Yoshi Mizumaki	271	−17	3 strokes	(Japan) Hisayuki Sasaki	
Super Mario Yomiuri Open
1999	(South Korea) Kim Jong-duck	270	−18	3 strokes	(Japan) Hajime Meshiai (Japan) Hidemichi Tanaka	
Yomiuri Open
1998	(United States) Brian Watts	134 (Note: Shortened to 36 holes due to weather.)	−10	1 stroke	(Japan) Kaname Yokoo	
1997	(Japan) Shigeki Maruyama	267	−17	2 strokes	(Japan) Naomichi Ozaki	
Pocari Sweat Yomiuri Open
1996	(Japan) Kazuhiro Fukunaga	266	−18	Playoff	(United States) Todd Hamilton	
1995	(Colombia) Eduardo Herrera	272	−12	1 stroke	(Japan) Hiroyuki Fujita	
Yomiuri Open
1994	(Japan) Tsukasa Watanabe	270	−14	2 strokes	(Australia) Anthony Gilligan	
Yomiuri Sapporo Beer Open
1993	(Japan) Katsuji Hasegawa	203	−13	Playoff	(Japan) Hajime Meshiai	
1992	(United States) David Ishii	278	−10	1 stroke	(Australia) Brian Jones	
1991	(Japan) Tsuneyuki Nakajima (2)	272	−16	3 strokes	(Canada) Rick Gibson	
1990	(Japan) Saburo Fujiki (2)	205	−11	1 stroke	(Japan) Taisei Inagaki	
1989	(Japan) Hajime Meshiai	205	−11	2 strokes	(Japan) Naomichi Ozaki	
1988	(Japan) Masahiro Kuramoto	277	−11	4 strokes	(Australia) Ian Baker-Finch (Japan) Tsukasa Watanabe (Japan) Yoshikazu Yokoshima	
1987	(Japan) Satoshi Higashi	280	−8	1 stroke	(Australia) Graham Marsh (Japan) Hajime Meshiai	
1986	(Japan) Koichi Suzuki	273	−19	2 strokes	(Australia) Brian Jones	
1985	(Japan) Tsuneyuki Nakajima	275	−17	3 strokes	(Japan) Katsuji Hasegawa	
Yomiuri Open
1984	(Japan) Saburo Fujiki	281	−11	4 strokes	(Japan) Shinsaku Maeda	
1983	(Australia) Graham Marsh (4)	280	−12	Playoff	(Japan) Tōru Nakamura	
1982	(Australia) Terry Gale	276	−16	3 strokes	(Japan) Masahiro Kuramoto (Japan) Tsuneyuki Nakajima (Japan) Namio Takasu (Japan) Nobumitsu Yuhara	
1981	(Japan) Namio Takasu	285	−7	Playoff	(Taiwan) Hsieh Yung-yo	
1980	(Japan) Isao Aoki	283	−9	1 stroke	(Japan) Teruo Sugihara	
1979	(Japan) Teruo Sugihara (2)	287	−5	Playoff	(Japan) Masashi Ozaki	
Wizard Tournament
1978	(Japan) Tōru Nakamura	214	−2	1 stroke	(Japan) Kikuo Arai (Japan) Yoshitaka Yamamoto	
1977	(Australia) Graham Marsh (3)	220	+4	2 strokes	(Japan) Seiji Kusakabe	
1976	(Australia) Graham Marsh (2)	212	−4	1 stroke	(Japan) Haruo Yasuda	
1975	(Australia) Graham Marsh	141	−3	1 stroke	(Taiwan) Lu Liang-Huan	
1974	(Japan) Teruo Sugihara	146	+2	Playoff	(Japan) Kosaku Shimada	
1973	(Japan) Yoshitaka Yamamoto					
1972	(Japan) Masashi Ozaki	144	E	Playoff	(Australia) Peter Thomson	
1971	(Australia) Peter Thomson	143	−1	1 stroke	(Taiwan) Lu Liang-Huan	
1970	(Taiwan) Hsieh Yung-yo	146	+2	1 stroke	(Japan) Hideyo Sugimoto	
