= 1993 PGA of Japan Tour =

Golf tour season

1993 PGA of Japan Tour season
- Duration: 4 March 1993 – 12 December 1993
- Number of official events: 39
- Most wins: (Japan) Hajime Meshiai (3) (Japan) Masashi Ozaki (3)
- Money list: (Japan) Hajime Meshiai

The 1993 PGA of Japan Tour was the 21st season of the PGA of Japan Tour, the main professional golf tour in Japan since it was formed in 1973.

== Schedule ==
The following table lists official events during the 1993 season.

Date	Tournament	Location	Purse (¥)	Winner (Note: The number in brackets after each winner's name is the number of PGA of Japan Tour events they had won up to and including that tournament. This information is only shown for PGA of Japan Tour members.)	OWGR points	Other tours (Note: AGC − Asia Golf Circuit.)	Notes
7 Mar	Token Cup	Kagoshima	100,000,000	(Japan) Hajime Meshiai (5)	16		New tournament
14 Mar	Imperial Open	Chiba	65,000,000	(Japan) Nobuo Serizawa (3)	16		
21 Mar	Dydo Shizuoka Open	Shizuoka	100,000,000	(United States) David Ishii (12)	16		
28 Mar	TaylorMade KSB Open	Okayama	70,000,000	(Japan) Tateo Ozaki (14)	16		
4 Apr	Descente Classic	Hyōgo	80,000,000	(Japan) Tetsu Nishikawa (2)	16		
11 Apr	Pocari Sweat Open	Hiroshima	80,000,000	(Japan) Shinji Ikeuchi (1)	16		
18 Apr	Bridgestone Aso Open	Kumamoto	70,000,000	(Japan) Shigeru Kawamata (1)	16		
25 Apr	Dunlop Open	Ibaraki	100,000,000	(Japan) Hajime Meshiai (6)	20	AGC	
2 May	The Crowns	Aichi	120,000,000	(Australia) Peter Senior (2)	30		
9 May	Fujisankei Classic	Shizuoka	120,000,000	(Japan) Masashi Ozaki (60)	16		
16 May	Japan PGA Championship	Hyōgo	100,000,000	(Japan) Masashi Ozaki (61)	18		
23 May	Pepsi Ube Kosan Open	Yamaguchi	80,000,000	(Japan) Shigeki Maruyama (1)	16		
30 May	Mitsubishi Galant Tournament	Ibaraki	100,000,000	(Taiwan) Chen Tze-chung (5)	16		
6 Jun	JCB Classic Sendai	Miyagi	100,000,000	(Japan) Yoshi Mizumaki (2)	16		
13 Jun	Sapporo Tokyu Open	Hokkaidō	100,000,000	(Australia) Brian Jones (11)	16		
20 Jun	Yomiuri Sapporo Beer Open	Hyōgo	100,000,000	(Japan) Katsuji Hasegawa (2)	16		
27 Jun	Mizuno Open	Ishikawa	100,000,000	(Japan) Seiki Okuda (4)	16		
4 Jul	PGA Philanthropy Tournament	Hokkaidō	100,000,000	(Australia) Roger Mackay (7)	16		
11 Jul	Yonex Open Hiroshima	Hiroshima	80,000,000	(Japan) Toshiaki Odate (1)	16		
25 Jul	Nikkei Cup	Hokkaidō	80,000,000	(Singapore) Samson Gimson (1)	16		
1 Aug	NST Niigata Open	Niigata	60,000,000	(Japan) Kōki Idoki (2)	16		
15 Aug	Acom International	Ibaraki	100,000,000	(United States) Todd Hamilton (2)	16		
22 Aug	Maruman Open	Saitama	120,000,000	(Philippines) Frankie Miñoza (2)	18		
29 Aug	Daiwa KBC Augusta	Fukuoka	100,000,000	(Taiwan) Chen Tze-chung (6)	18		
5 Sep	Japan PGA Match-Play Championship Promise Cup	Tochigi	80,000,000	(Japan) Yoshitaka Yamamoto (13)	16		
12 Sep	Suntory Open	Chiba	100,000,000	(Japan) Eiichi Itai (3)	20		
19 Sep	ANA Open	Hokkaidō	100,000,000	(Japan) Tsuneyuki Nakajima (40)	20		
26 Sep	Gene Sarazen Jun Classic	Tochigi	110,000,000	(Japan) Toru Suzuki (1)	16		
3 Oct	Tokai Classic	Aichi	110,000,000	(Japan) Saburo Fujiki (14)	18		
10 Oct	Japan Open Golf Championship	Shiga	100,000,000	(Japan) Seiki Okuda (5)	32		Flagship event
17 Oct	Asahi Beer Golf Digest Tournament	Shizuoka	150,000,000	(Japan) Masashi Ozaki (62)	28		
24 Oct	Bridgestone Open	Chiba	120,000,000	(Japan) Ikuo Shirahama (2)	22		
31 Oct	Lark Cup	Hyōgo	200,000,000	(Japan) Hajime Meshiai (7)	20		
7 Nov	Daiwa International	Ibaraki	170,000,000	(Japan) Tsukasa Watanabe (1)	28		New tournament
14 Nov	Sumitomo Visa Taiheiyo Masters	Shizuoka	150,000,000	(Australia) Greg Norman (n/a)	38		
21 Nov	Dunlop Phoenix Tournament	Miyazaki	200,000,000	(South Africa) Ernie Els (n/a)	44		
28 Nov	Casio World Open	Kagoshima	150,000,000	(United States) Tom Lehman (n/a)	26		
5 Dec	Golf Nippon Series Hitachi Cup	Tokyo	100,000,000	(Japan) Tsuneyuki Nakajima (41)	18		
12 Dec	Daikyo Open	Okinawa	120,000,000	(Japan) Tomohiro Maruyama (2)	16		

== Money list ==
The money list was based on prize money won during the season, calculated in Japanese yen.

Position	Player	Prize money (¥)
1	(Japan) Hajime Meshiai	148,718,200
2	(Japan) Masashi Ozaki	144,597,000
3	(Japan) Tsuneyuki Nakajima	130,842,771
4	(Taiwan) Chen Tze-chung	112,427,166
5	(Japan) Tsukasa Watanabe	103,774,100

== Japan Challenge Tour ==
1993 Japan Challenge Tour season
- Duration: 15 April 1993 – 18 November 1993
- Number of official events: 10
- Most wins: (South Korea) Lim Jin-han (2)

The 1993 Japan Challenge Tour was the ninth season of the Japan Challenge Tour, the official development tour to the PGA of Japan Tour.

=== Schedule ===
The following table lists official events during the 1993 season.

Date	Tournament	Location	Purse (¥)	Winner (Note: The number in brackets after each winner's name is the number of Japan Challenge Tour events they had won up to and including that tournament. It is rare for someone to accumulate many wins on the Japan Challenge Tour as success at this level usually leads to promotion to the PGA of Japan Tour.)
16 Apr	Korakuen Cup (1st)	Tochigi	15,000,000	(Japan) Yoshiyuki Isomura (1)
27 May	Kanto Kokusai Open	Tochigi	15,000,000	(South Korea) Lim Jin-han (1)
3 Jun	Mito Green Open	Ibaraki	15,000,000	(Japan) Shingo Katayama (a) (1)
18 Jun	Korakuen Cup (2nd)	Hokkaido	15,000,000	(Japan) Jun Hattori (1)
30 Jun	Kansai PGA Philanthropy	Ehme	15,000,000	(Japan) Yuzo Oyama (1)
30 Jun	Kanto PGA Philanthropy	Tochigi	15,000,000	(Japan) Mitsuyasu Kojima (1)
7 Jul	Sports Shinko Open	Okayama	15,000,000	(Australia) Wayne Smith (1)
9 Sep	Korakuen Cup (3rd)	Tochigi	15,000,000	(Japan) Kazuhiro Fukunaga (1)
14 Oct	Korakuen Cup (4th)	Oita	15,000,000	(South Korea) Lim Jin-han (2)
18 Nov	Korakuen Cup (5th)	Tochigi	15,000,000	(Japan) Keiichiro Fukabori (1)
