= Mitsuhiko Masuda =

Japanese professional golfer (born 1937)

Personal information
- Nationality: Japan
- Born: 1 December 1937 (age 88) Kumamoto Prefecture
- Height: 1.57 m (5 ft 2 in)
- Weight: 58 kg (128 lb; 9.1 st)

Career
- Sport: Golf
- Status: Professional
- Former tour: Japan Golf Tour
- Professional wins: 2

Number of wins by tour
- Japan Golf Tour: 2

Mitsuhiko Masuda (増田 光彦, Masuda Mitsuhiko; born 1 December 1937) is a Japanese professional golfer.

== Career ==
Masuda played on the Japan Golf Tour, winning twice.

== Professional wins (2) ==
=== PGA of Japan Tour wins (2) ===
- 1973 Chushikoku Open
- 1974 Chushikoku Open
