= 1998 PGA of Japan Tour =

Golf tour season

1998 PGA of Japan Tour season
- Duration: 12 March 1998 – 13 December 1998
- Number of official events: 36
- Most wins: (United States) Brandt Jobe (3) (Japan) Masashi Ozaki (3) (Japan) Hidemichi Tanaka (3)
- Money list: (Japan) Masashi Ozaki

The 1998 PGA of Japan Tour was the 26th season of the PGA of Japan Tour, the main professional golf tour in Japan since it was formed in 1973.

== Schedule ==
The following table lists official events during the 1998 season.

| Date | Tournament | Location | Purse (¥) | Winner (Note: The number in brackets after each winner's name is the number of PGA of Japan Tour events they had won up to and including that tournament. This information is only shown for PGA of Japan Tour members.) | OWGR points | Other tours (Note: AGC − Asia Golf Circuit.) | Notes |
|---|---|---|---|---|---|---|---|
| 15 Mar | Token Corporation Cup | Kagoshima | 110,000,000 | (Japan) Hajime Meshiai (10) | 22 | | |
| 22 Mar | Dydo Drinco Shizuoka Open | Shizuoka | 100,000,000 | (Colombia) Eduardo Herrera (4) | 16 | | |
| 29 Mar | Just System KSB Open | Kagawa | 100,000,000 | (Paraguay) Carlos Franco (4) | 16 | | |
| 5 Apr | Descente Classic Munsingwear Cup | Chiba | 100,000,000 | (Fiji) Dinesh Chand (1) | 18 | | |
| 19 Apr | Tsuruya Open | Hyōgo | 100,000,000 | (Japan) Katsumasa Miyamoto (1) | 16 | | |
| 26 Apr | Kirin Open | Ibaraki | 100,000,000 | (Philippines) Frankie Miñoza (5) | 24 | AGC | |
| 3 May | The Crowns | Aichi | 120,000,000 | (United States) Davis Love III (n/a) | 34 | | |
| 10 May | Fujisankei Classic | Shizuoka | 120,000,000 | (Paraguay) Carlos Franco (5) | 24 | | |
| 17 May | Japan PGA Championship | Nara | 120,000,000 | (United States) Brandt Jobe (4) | 24 | | |
| 24 May | Ube Kosan Open | Yamaguchi | 100,000,000 | (United States) Brandt Jobe (5) | 16 | | |
| 31 May | Mitsubishi Galant Tournament | Kōchi | 100,000,000 | (Japan) Toru Taniguchi (1) | 16 | | |
| 7 Jun | JCB Classic Sendai | Miyagi | 100,000,000 | (Japan) Yoshi Mizumaki (6) | 16 | | |
| 14 Jun | Sapporo Tokyu Open | Hokkaidō | 100,000,000 | (Japan) Toru Suzuki (4) | 16 | | |
| 21 Jun | Yomiuri Open | Hyōgo | 100,000,000 | (United States) Brian Watts (11) | 16 | | |
| 28 Jun | Gateway to The Open Mizuno Open | Okayama | 100,000,000 | (United States) Brandt Jobe (6) | 20 | | |
| 5 Jul | PGA Philanthropy Tournament | Gunma | 100,000,000 | (Japan) Shigeki Maruyama (8) | 16 | | |
| 12 Jul | Yonex Open Hiroshima | Hiroshima | 100,000,000 | (Japan) Masashi Ozaki (88) | 16 | | |
| 26 Jul | Aiful Cup | Aomori | 100,000,000 | (Japan) Hidemichi Tanaka (3) | 16 | | |
| 2 Aug | NST Niigata Open Golf Championship | Niigata | 60,000,000 | (Japan) Masayuki Kawamura (2) | 16 | | |
| 9 Aug | Sanko Grand Summer Championship | Gunma | 100,000,000 | (Japan) Shingo Katayama (1) | 16 | | |
| 30 Aug | Hisamitsu-KBC Augusta | Fukuoka | 100,000,000 | (Japan) Masashi Ozaki (89) | 16 | | |
| 6 Sep | Japan PGA Match-Play Championship Promise Cup | Hokkaidō | 100,000,000 | (Japan) Katsunori Kuwabara (2) | 20 | | |
| 13 Sep | Suntory Open | Chiba | 100,000,000 | (Japan) Mamo Osanai (1) | 24 | | |
| 20 Sep | ANA Open | Hokkaidō | 100,000,000 | (Japan) Keiichiro Fukabori (2) | 24 | | |
| 27 Sep | Gene Sarazen Jun Classic | Tochigi | 110,000,000 | (United States) Todd Hamilton (7) | 22 | | |
| 4 Oct | Japan Open Golf Championship | Ibaraki | 120,000,000 | (Japan) Hidemichi Tanaka (4) | 32 | | Flagship event |
| 11 Oct | Tokai Classic | Aichi | 110,000,000 | (Japan) Toshimitsu Izawa (2) | 20 | | |
| 18 Oct | Nikkei Cup Torakichi Nakamura Memorial | Ibaraki | 110,000,000 | (Japan) Mitsutaka Kusakabe (3) | 20 | | |
| 25 Oct | Bridgestone Open | Chiba | 120,000,000 | (Japan) Nobuhito Sato (2) | 30 | | |
| 1 Nov | Philip Morris Championship | Hyōgo | 200,000,000 | (Japan) Masashi Ozaki (90) | 24 | | |
| 8 Nov | Acom International | Fukushima | 120,000,000 | (Japan) Kaname Yokoo (1) | 16 | | |
| 15 Nov | Sumitomo Visa Taiheiyo Masters | Shizuoka | 150,000,000 | (England) Lee Westwood (n/a) | 38 | | |
| 22 Nov | Dunlop Phoenix Tournament | Miyazaki | 250,000,000 | (England) Lee Westwood (n/a) | 40 | | |
| 29 Nov | Casio World Open | Kagoshima | 150,000,000 | (United States) Brian Watts (12) | 36 | | |
| 6 Dec | Golf Nippon Series JT Cup | Tokyo | 100,000,000 | (Japan) Katsumasa Miyamoto (2) | 24 | | |
| 13 Dec | DDI Group Okinawa Open | Okinawa | 80,000,000 | (Japan) Hidemichi Tanaka (5) | 16 | | |

=== Unofficial events ===
The following events were sanctioned by the PGA of Japan Tour, but did not carry official money, nor were wins official.

| Date | Tournament | Location | Purse | Winner | OWGR points | Other tours | Notes |
|---|---|---|---|---|---|---|---|
| 12 Apr | Masters Tournament | United States | US$3,200,000 | (United States) Mark O'Meara | 100 | | Major championship |
| 21 Jun | U.S. Open | United States | US$3,000,000 | (United States) Lee Janzen | 100 | | Major championship |
| 19 Jul | The Open Championship | England | £1,700,000 | (United States) Mark O'Meara | 100 | | Major championship |
| 16 Aug | PGA Championship | United States | US$3,000,000 | (Fiji) Vijay Singh | 100 | | Major championship |

== Money list ==
The money list was based on prize money won during the season, calculated in Japanese yen.

| Position | Player | Prize money (¥) |
|---|---|---|
| 1 | (Japan) Masashi Ozaki | 179,627,400 |
| 2 | (United States) Brian Watts | 132,014,990 |
| 3 | (Japan) Hidemichi Tanaka | 103,941,437 |
| 4 | (United States) Brandt Jobe | 97,566,406 |
| 5 | (Japan) Katsumasa Miyamoto | 93,580,618 |

== Japan Challenge Tour ==
1998 Japan Challenge Tour season
- Duration: 25 March 1998 – 19 November 1998
- Number of official events: 14
- Most wins: (Japan) Taisuke Kitajima (2) (Japan) Masakazu Noritake (2) (Japan) Gohei Sato (2)

The 1998 Japan Challenge Tour was the 14th season of the Japan Challenge Tour, the official development tour to the PGA of Japan Tour.

=== Schedule ===
The following table lists official events during the 1998 season.

| Date | Tournament | Location | Purse (¥) | Winner (Note: The number in brackets after each winner's name is the number of Japan Challenge Tour events they had won up to and including that tournament. It is rare for someone to accumulate many wins on the Japan Challenge Tour as success at this level usually leads to promotion to the PGA of Japan Tour.) |
|---|---|---|---|---|
| 26 Mar | PRGR Cup | Tochigi | 10,000,000 | (Japan) Gohei Sato (3) |
| 16 Apr | Korakuen Cup (1st) | Ibaraki | 10,000,000 | (Japan) Shinsuke Yanagisawa (1) |
| 24 Apr | Nishino Cup Open | Ibaraki | 10,000,000 | (Japan) Masakazu Noritake (1) |
| 29 Apr | Daiwa Cup Kochi Open | Kochi | 10,000,000 | (Japan) Naoya Sugiyama (2) |
| 21 May | Aiful Challenge Cup Spring | Hyōgo | 10,000,000 | (Japan) Hiroshi Ueda (2) |
| 12 Jun | Matsugamine Open | Niigata | 10,000,000 | (Japan) Taisuke Kitajima (2) |
| 18 Jun | Korakuen Cup (2nd) | Hokkaido | 10,000,000 | (Japan) Tetsuya Haraguchi (1) |
| 29 Jul | Twin Fields Cup | Ishikawa | 10,000,000 | (Japan) Kazumasa Sakaitani (1) |
| 20 Aug | Daiwa Cup Akita Open | Akita | 10,000,000 | (Japan) Takashi Tsutsumi (1) |
| 27 Aug | Andersen Consulting Growing Cup | Ibaraki | 10,000,000 | (Japan) Masakazu Noritake (2) |
| 11 Sep | Aiful Challenge Cup Autumn | Chiba | 10,000,000 | (Japan) Taisuke Kitajima (3) |
| 8 Oct | Korakuen Cup (3rd) | Oita | 10,000,000 | (Japan) Masayuki Tomita (1) |
| 22 Oct | Daiwa Cup Yamanashi Open | Yamanashi | 10,000,000 | (Japan) Yoshimi Niizeki (1) |
| 19 Nov | Korakuen Cup (4th) | Tochigi | 10,000,000 | (Japan) Gohei Sato (4) |
