= Hidezumi Shirakata =

Japanese golfer

Personal information
- Nationality: Japan
- Born: 6 September 1966 (age 60) Fukuoka Prefecture, Japan
- Height: 1.72 m (5 ft 8 in)
- Weight: 72 kg (159 lb; 11.3 st)

Career
- Sport: Golf
- Status: Professional
- Current tour: Japan PGA Senior Tour
- Former tour: Japan Golf Tour
- Professional wins: 9

Number of wins by tour
- Japan Golf Tour: 1
- Other: 8

Hidezumi Shirakata (born 6 September 1966) is a Japanese professional golfer.

== Career ==
Shirakata plays on the Japan Golf Tour, where he has won once.

== Professional wins (9) ==
=== Japan Golf Tour wins (1) ===
No.	Date	Tournament	Winning score	Margin of victory	Runner-up
1	30 Jul 2000	NST Niigata Open Golf Championship	−19 (66-70-66-67=269)	4 strokes	(Japan) Kiyoshi Murota

=== Asia Golf Circuit wins (1) ===
No.	Date	Tournament	Winning score	Margin of victory	Runners-up
1	18 Feb 1996	Classic Indian Open	−11 (66-72-69-70=277)	3 strokes	(India) Basad Ali, (Sweden) Daniel Chopra, (India) Jyoti Randhawa

=== Japan Challenge Tour wins (2) ===
- 1994 Kansai PGA Philanthropy
- 2011 Fuji Country Kani Club Challenge Cup

=== Other wins (4) ===
- 1994 Chushikoku Open
- 1997 Chushikoku Open
- 2003 Kyusyu Open
- 2006 Kyusyu Open

=== Japan PGA Senior Tour wins (1) ===
No.	Date	Tournament	Winning score	Margin of victory	Runners-up
1	13 Oct 2019	Japan PGA Senior Championship Sumitomo Corporation Summit Cup	−12 (67-65-72=204) (Note: Shortened to 54 holes due to Typhoon Hagibis.)	3 strokes	(Japan) Masahiro Kuramoto, (Thailand) Prayad Marksaeng, (Japan) Yoshinobu Tsukada, (Thailand) Thaworn Wiratchant
