= 1990 PGA of Japan Tour =

Golf tour season

1990 PGA of Japan Tour season
- Duration: 1 March 1990 – 9 December 1990
- Number of official events: 44
- Most wins: (Japan) Masashi Ozaki (4)
- Money list: (Japan) Masashi Ozaki

The 1990 PGA of Japan Tour was the 18th season of the PGA of Japan Tour, the main professional golf tour in Japan since it was formed in 1973.

== Schedule ==
The following table lists official events during the 1990 season.

| Date | Tournament | Location | Purse (¥) | Winner (Note: The number in brackets after each winner's name is the number of PGA of Japan Tour events they had won up to and including that tournament. This information is only shown for PGA of Japan Tour members.) | OWGR points | Other tours (Note: AGC − Asia Golf Circuit.) | Notes |
|---|---|---|---|---|---|---|---|
| 4 Mar | Daiichi Fudosan Cup | Miyazaki | 100,000,000 | (Australia) Brian Jones (9) | 12 | | |
| 11 Mar | Imperial Open | Ibaraki | 55,000,000 | (Japan) Tōru Nakamura (18) | 12 | | New to PGA of Japan Tour |
| 18 Mar | Shizuoka Open | Shizuoka | 50,000,000 | (Japan) Ryoken Kawagishi (1) | 12 | | |
| 25 Mar | Seto Uthumi Open | Okayama | 60,000,000 | (Japan) Masahiro Kuramoto (23) | 12 | | |
| 8 Apr | Pocari Sweat Open | Hiroshima | 60,000,000 | (Japan) Nobumitsu Yuhara (4) | 12 | | |
| 15 Apr | Bridgestone Aso Open | Kumamoto | 50,000,000 | (Japan) Teruo Sugihara (26) | 10 | | |
| 22 Apr | Dunlop Open | Ibaraki | 100,000,000 | (Philippines) Frankie Miñoza (1) | 14 | AGC | |
| 29 Apr | The Crowns | Aichi | 100,000,000 | (Japan) Noboru Sugai (2) | 22 | | |
| 6 May | Fujisankei Classic | Shizuoka | 70,000,000 | (Japan) Masashi Ozaki (48) | 12 | | |
| 13 May | Japan PGA Match-Play Championship Unisys Cup | Fukushima | 50,000,000 | (Japan) Naomichi Ozaki (12) | 12 | | |
| 20 May | Pepsi Ube Kosan Open | Yamaguchi | 60,000,000 | (Japan) Tadao Nakamura (3) | 10 | | |
| 27 May | Mitsubishi Galant Tournament | Hyōgo | 70,000,000 | (Japan) Isao Aoki (48) | 14 | | |
| 3 Jun | JCB Classic Sendai | Miyagi | 60,000,000 | (Australia) Roger Mackay (2) | 12 | | |
| 10 Jun | Sapporo Tokyu Open | Hokkaidō | 60,000,000 | (Japan) Tadao Nakamura (4) | 12 | | |
| 17 Jun | Yomiuri Sapporo Beer Open | Hyōgo | 80,000,000 | (Japan) Saburo Fujiki (10) | 10 | | |
| 24 Jun | Mizuno Open | Ishikawa | 65,000,000 | (Australia) Brian Jones (10) | 12 | | |
| 1 Jul | Kanto Pro Championship | Tochigi | 50,000,000 | (Japan) Tsuneyuki Nakajima (32) | 4 | | |
| 1 Jul | Kansai Pro Championship | Tottori | 40,000,000 | (Japan) Kōki Idoki (1) | 4 | | |
| 8 Jul | Yonex Open Hiroshima | Hiroshima | 60,000,000 | (Japan) Masashi Ozaki (49) | 12 | | |
| 15 Jul | Nikkei Cup | Hokkaidō | 70,000,000 | (Japan) Satoshi Higashi (2) | 12 | | |
| 29 Jul | NST Niigata Open | Niigata | 50,000,000 | (Japan) Seiichi Kanai (11) | 12 | | |
| 5 Aug | Japan PGA Championship | Osaka | 75,000,000 | (Japan) Hideki Kase (1) | 12 | | |
| 19 Aug | Maruman Open | Saitama | 90,000,000 | (Japan) Masashi Ozaki (50) | 22 | | |
| 26 Aug | Daiwa KBC Augusta | Fukuoka | 100,000,000 | (Japan) Masashi Ozaki (51) | 12 | | |
| 2 Sep | Kanto Open | Tochigi | 30,000,000 | (Japan) Ryoken Kawagishi (2) | 6 | | |
| 2 Sep | Hokkaido Open | Hokkaidō | 10,000,000 | (Japan) Katsunari Takahashi (9) | 4 | | |
| 2 Sep | Chushikoku Open | Yamaguchi | 20,000,000 | (Japan) Seiki Okuda (1) | 4 | | |
| 2 Sep | Kyusyu Open | Fukuoka | 20,000,000 | (Japan) Katsuyoshi Tomori (4) | 4 | | |
| 2 Sep | Chubu Open | Ishikawa | 20,000,000 | (Japan) Hatsutoshi Sakai (1) | 4 | | |
| 2 Sep | Kansai Open | Hyōgo | 20,000,000 | (Japan) Teruo Sugihara (27) | 4 | | |
| 9 Sep | Suntory Open | Chiba | 100,000,000 | (Japan) Tōru Nakamura (19) | 14 | | |
| 16 Sep | ANA Open | Hokkaidō | 90,000,000 | (Japan) Tsuneyuki Nakajima (33) | 16 | | |
| 23 Sep | Gene Sarazen Jun Classic | Tochigi | 75,000,000 | (Japan) Naomichi Ozaki (13) | 12 | | |
| 30 Sep | Tokai Classic | Aichi | 80,000,000 | (Australia) Graham Marsh (20) | 12 | | |
| 7 Oct | Japan Open Golf Championship | Hokkaidō | 100,000,000 | (Japan) Tsuneyuki Nakajima (34) | 14 | | |
| 14 Oct | Asahi Beer Golf Digest Tournament | Shizuoka | 120,000,000 | (Japan) Noboru Sugai (3) | 20 | | |
| 21 Oct | Bridgestone Open | Chiba | 120,000,000 | (Japan) Saburo Fujiki (11) | 12 | | |
| 28 Oct | ABC Lark Cup | Hyōgo | 180,000,000 | (Japan) Ryoken Kawagishi (3) | 14 | | |
| 4 Nov | Acom P.T. | Mie | 70,000,000 | (United States) Bob Gilder (n/a) | 10 | | New tournament |
| 11 Nov | Visa Taiheiyo Club Masters | Shizuoka | 130,000,000 | (Spain) José María Olazábal (n/a) | 46 | | |
| 18 Nov | Dunlop Phoenix Tournament | Miyazaki | 200,000,000 | (United States) Larry Mize (n/a) | 46 | | |
| 25 Nov | Casio World Open | Kagoshima | 120,000,000 | (United States) Mike Reid (n/a) | 32 | | |
| 2 Dec | Golf Nippon Series Hitachi Cup | Tokyo | 60,000,000 | (Japan) Naomichi Ozaki (14) | 12 | | |
| 9 Dec | Daikyo Open | Okinawa | 100,000,000 | (Japan) Teruo Sugihara (28) | 12 | | |

== Money list ==
The money list was based on prize money won during the season, calculated in Japanese yen.

| Position | Player | Prize money (¥) |
|---|---|---|
| 1 | (Japan) Masashi Ozaki | 129,060,500 |
| 2 | (Japan) Tsuneyuki Nakajima | 96,979,100 |
| 3 | (Japan) Ryoken Kawagishi | 87,350,200 |
| 4 | (Japan) Naomichi Ozaki | 85,060,727 |
| 5 | (Japan) Saburo Fujiki | 79,143,626 |

== Japan Challenge Tour ==
1990 Japan Challenge Tour season
- Duration: 24 April 1990 – 21 November 1990
- Number of official events: 8
- Most wins: (Japan) Tetsu Nishikawa (2)

The 1990 Japan Challenge Tour was the sixth season of the Japan Challenge Tour, the official development tour to the PGA of Japan Tour.

=== Schedule ===
The following table lists official events during the 1990 season.

| Date | Tournament | Location | Purse (¥) | Winner (Note: The number in brackets after each winner's name is the number of Japan Challenge Tour events they had won up to and including that tournament. It is rare for someone to accumulate many wins on the Japan Challenge Tour as success at this level usually leads to promotion to the PGA of Japan Tour.) |
|---|---|---|---|---|
| 25 Apr | Korakuen Cup (1st) | Tochigi | 15,000,000 | (Japan) Hideyuki Sato (1) |
| 31 May | Kanto Kokusai Open | Tochigi | 15,000,000 | (Japan) Tetsu Nishikawa (1) |
| 6 Jun | Mito Green Open | Ibaraki | 15,000,000 | (Japan) Hiroharu Tokito (1) |
| 11 Jul | Sports Shinko Open | Osaka | 15,000,000 | (Japan) Toshiaki Nakagawa (2) |
| 22 Aug | Korakuen Cup (2nd) | Hokkaido | 15,000,000 | (Japan) Tetsu Nishikawa (2) |
| 27 Sep | Korakuen Cup (3rd) | Tochigi | 15,000,000 | (Japan) Shinichi Arai (1) |
| 24 Oct | Korakuen Cup (4th) | Tochigi | 15,000,000 | (Japan) Takaaki Fukuzawa (1) |
| 21 Nov | Korakuen Cup (5th) | Tochigi | 15,000,000 | (Japan) Hiromichi Namiki (1) |
