= Tadami Ueno =

Japanese professional golfer

Personal information
- Nationality: Japan
- Born: 9 December 1948 (age 77) Hiroshima Prefecture, Japan
- Height: 1.77 m (5 ft 10 in)
- Weight: 82 kg (181 lb; 12.9 st)

Career
- Sport: Golf
- Status: Professional
- Former tour: Japan Golf Tour
- Professional wins: 8

Number of wins by tour
- Japan Golf Tour: 7
- Other: 1

Tadami Ueno (born 9 December 1948) is a Japanese professional golfer.

== Professional career ==
Ueno played on the Japan Golf Tour, winning seven times.

== Professional wins (8) ==
=== PGA of Japan Tour wins (7) ===
No.	Date	Tournament	Winning score	Margin of victory	Runner(s)-up
1	25 Jul 1975	Chushikoku Open	−9 (73-69-70-67=279)		
2	16 Jul 1976	Chushikoku Open (2)	−7 (64-74-72-71=281)		
3	15 Jul 1977	Chushikoku Open (3)	+2 (71-76-74-69=290)		
4	4 Sep 1978	Aso National Park Open	−1 (74-69=143)	Playoff	(Japan) Tatsuo Fujima, (Japan) Teruo Suzumura
5	7 Sep 1986	Chushikoku Open (4)	−17 (67-71-68-69=275)	1 stroke	(Japan) Masahiro Kuramoto
6	3 Sep 1989	Chushikoku Open (5)	−5 (69-69-71-74=283)	1 stroke	(Japan) Norio Mikami, (Japan) Yoshikazu Sakamoto
7	9 Jun 1991	JCB Classic Sendai	−13 (66-72-66-67=271)	1 stroke	(Australia) Graham Marsh

PGA of Japan Tour playoff record (1–1)

No.	Year	Tournament	Opponent(s)	Result
1	1978	Aso National Park Open	(Japan) Tatsuo Fujima, (Japan) Teruo Suzumura	
2	1983	Bridgestone Aso Open	(Japan) Fujio Kobayashi	Lost to birdie on first extra hole

=== Senior wins (1) ===
- 1999 Japan PGA Senior Championship

== Team appearances ==
- World Cup (representing Japan): 1990

== See also ==
- List of male golfers
