= 1999 Japan Golf Tour =

Golf tour season

1999 Japan Golf Tour season
- Duration: 11 March 1999 – 12 December 1999
- Number of official events: 32
- Most wins: (Japan) Naomichi Ozaki (3) (Japan) Tsuyoshi Yoneyama (3)
- Money list: (Japan) Naomichi Ozaki

The 1999 Japan Golf Tour was the 27th season of the Japan Golf Tour (formerly the PGA of Japan Tour), the main professional golf tour in Japan since it was formed in 1973.

== Japan Golf Tour Organization formation ==
It was the first season in which the newly formed Japan Golf Tour Organization took over the running of the tour, separating from the PGA of Japan.

== Schedule ==
The following table lists official events during the 1999 season.

Date	Tournament	Location	Purse (¥)	Winner (Note: The number in brackets after each winner's name is the number of Japan Golf Tour events they had won up to and including that tournament. This information is only shown for Japan Golf Tour members.)	OWGR points	Other tours (Note: AGC − Asia Golf Circuit.)	Notes
14 Mar	Token Corporation Cup	Kagoshima	100,000,000	(Japan) Masashi Ozaki (91)	16		
21 Mar	Dydo Drinco Shizuoka Open	Shizuoka	100,000,000	(South Korea) Kim Jong-duck (2)	16		
28 Mar	Georgia KSB Open	Okayama	70,000,000	(Japan) Yoshinori Kaneko (6)	16		
4 Apr	Descente Classic Munsingwear Cup	Chiba	90,000,000	(Japan) Masayuki Kawamura (3)	16		
18 Apr	Tsuruya Open	Hyōgo	100,000,000	(Japan) Naomichi Ozaki (26)	16		
25 Apr	Kirin Open	Ibaraki	100,000,000	(South Korea) K. J. Choi (1)	18	AGC	
2 May	The Crowns	Aichi	110,000,000	(Japan) Yasuharu Imano (1)	26		
9 May	Fujisankei Classic	Shizuoka	110,000,000	(Japan) Shigemasa Higaki (1)	16		
16 May	Japan PGA Championship	Ishikawa	110,000,000	(Japan) Naomichi Ozaki (27)	18		
23 May	Ube Kosan Open	Yamaguchi	100,000,000	(South Korea) K. J. Choi (2)	16		
30 May	Mitsubishi Motors Tournament	Gifu	100,000,000	(Japan) Tsuyoshi Yoneyama (1)	16		
6 Jun	JCB Classic Sendai	Miyagi	100,000,000	(Japan) Shingo Katayama (2)	16		
20 Jun	Super Mario Yomiuri Open	Hyōgo	90,000,000	(South Korea) Kim Jong-duck (3)	16		
27 Jun	Gateway to The Open Mizuno Open	Okayama	90,000,000	(Colombia) Eduardo Herrera (5)	16		
11 Jul	Yonex Open Hiroshima	Hiroshima	90,000,000	(Japan) Masashi Ozaki (92)	16		
25 Jul	Aiful Cup	Aomori	90,000,000	(Japan) Toshimitsu Izawa (3)	16		
1 Aug	NST Niigata Open Golf Championship	Niigata	50,000,000	(Japan) Toshimitsu Izawa (4)	16		
29 Aug	Hisamitsu-KBC Augusta	Fukuoka	90,000,000	(Japan) Tsuyoshi Yoneyama (2)	16		
5 Sep	Japan PGA Match-Play Championship Promise Cup	Hokkaidō	80,000,000	(Japan) Mamo Osanai (2)	16		
12 Sep	Suntory Open	Chiba	90,000,000	(Zimbabwe) Nick Price (n/a)	18		
19 Sep	ANA Open	Hokkaidō	100,000,000	(Japan) Kazuhiko Hosokawa (5)	16		
26 Sep	Gene Sarazen Jun Classic	Tochigi	100,000,000	(Japan) Hajime Meshiai (11)	16		
3 Oct	Japan Open Golf Championship	Hokkaidō	120,000,000	(Japan) Naomichi Ozaki (28)	32		Flagship event
10 Oct	Tokai Classic	Aichi	100,000,000	(Japan) Kaname Yokoo (2)	20		
24 Oct	Bridgestone Open	Chiba	110,000,000	(Japan) Shigeki Maruyama (9)	16		
31 Oct	Philip Morris Championship	Hyōgo	200,000,000	(Japan) Ryoken Kawagishi (6)	16		
7 Nov	Acom International	Ibaraki	110,000,000	(Japan) Hidemichi Tanaka (6)	16		
14 Nov	Sumitomo Visa Taiheiyo Masters	Shizuoka	140,000,000	(Japan) Hirofumi Miyase (2)	40		
21 Nov	Dunlop Phoenix Tournament	Miyazaki	200,000,000	(Denmark) Thomas Bjørn (n/a)	42		
28 Nov	Casio World Open	Kagoshima	140,000,000	(Japan) Tsuyoshi Yoneyama (3)	28		
5 Dec	Golf Nippon Series JT Cup	Tokyo	90,000,000	(Japan) Kazuhiko Hosokawa (6)	16		
12 Dec	Fancl Okinawa Open	Okinawa	90,000,000	(Japan) Taichi Teshima (1)	16		

=== Unofficial events ===
The following events were sanctioned by the Japan Golf Tour, but did not carry official money, nor were wins official.

Date	Tournament	Location	Purse	Winner	OWGR points	Other tours	Notes
11 Apr	Masters Tournament	United States	US$4,000,000	(Spain) José María Olazábal	100		Major championship
20 Jun	U.S. Open	United States	US$3,500,000	(United States) Payne Stewart	100		Major championship
18 Jul	The Open Championship	Scotland	£2,000,000	(Scotland) Paul Lawrie	100		Major championship
15 Aug	PGA Championship	United States	US$3,500,000	(United States) Tiger Woods	100		Major championship

== Money list ==
The money list was based on prize money won during the season, calculated in Japanese yen.

Position	Player	Prize money (¥)
1	(Japan) Naomichi Ozaki	137,641,796
2	(Japan) Kazuhiko Hosokawa	129,058,283
3	(Japan) Shigeki Maruyama	114,958,525
4	(Japan) Toshimitsu Izawa	110,927,044
5	(Japan) Tsuyoshi Yoneyama	106,872,033

== Japan Challenge Tour ==
1999 Japan Challenge Tour season
- Duration: 31 March 1999 – 4 November 1999
- Number of official events: 11
- Money list: (Japan) Kosaku Makisaka

The 1999 Japan Challenge Tour was the 15th season of the Japan Challenge Tour, the official development tour to the Japan Golf Tour.

=== Schedule ===
The following table lists official events during the 1999 season.

Date	Tournament	Location	Purse (¥)	Winner (Note: The number in brackets after each winner's name is the number of Japan Challenge Tour events they had won up to and including that tournament. It is rare for someone to accumulate many wins on the Japan Challenge Tour as success at this level usually leads to promotion to the Japan Golf Tour.)
1 Apr	PRGR Cup (East)	Tochigi	10,000,000	(Australia) Richard Tate (1)
15 Apr	Kourakuen Cup (1st)	Ibaraki	10,000,000	(Japan) Masayuki Inoue (1)
11 Jun	Aiful Challenge Cup Spring	Hyōgo	10,000,000	(Japan) Yoshimi Niizeki (2)
18 Jun	Kourakuen Cup (2nd)	Hokkaido	10,000,000	(Japan) Taku Sugaya (1)
9 Jul	Nishino Cup Open	Ibaraki	10,000,000	(Japan) Sushi Ishigaki (1)
23 Jul	PRGR Cup (West)	Hyōgo	10,000,000	(Japan) Tatsuaki Nakamura (1)
19 Aug	Descente Challenge Cup	Ishikawa	10,000,000	(Japan) Kosaku Makisaka (2)
9 Sep	Kourakuen Cup (3rd)	Oita	10,000,000	(Japan) Yoichi Shimizu (1)
22 Sep	Aiful Challenge Cup Autumn	Chiba	10,000,000	(Japan) Satoshi Oide (1)
15 Oct	Shinwa Golf Classic	Hyōgo	10,000,000	(Japan) Tatsuhiko Takahashi (1)
4 Nov	Kourakuen Cup (4th)	Tochigi	10,000,000	(Japan) Masahiko Akazawa (1)

=== Money list ===
The money list was based on prize money won during the season, calculated in Japanese yen. The top five players on the money list earned status to play on the 2000 Japan Golf Tour (iiyama Tour).

Position	Player	Prize money (¥)
1	(Japan) Kosaku Makisaka	3,461,294
2	(Japan) Tatsuaki Nakamura	3,252,902
3	(Japan) Sushi Ishigaki	3,175,466
4	(Japan) Yoichi Shimizu	3,142,242
5	(Japan) Tatsuhiko Takahashi	2,538,627
