= Hajime Meshiai =

Japanese golfer (born 1954)

Hajime Meshiai 飯合 肇
Personal information
- Nationality: Japan
- Born: 12 March 1954 (age 72) Chiba Prefecture, Japan
- Height: 1.74 m (5 ft 9 in)
- Weight: 82 kg (181 lb; 12.9 st)

Career
- Sport: Golf
- College: Komazawa University
- Turned professional: 1978
- Former tours: Japan Golf Tour; Champions Tour
- Professional wins: 17
- Highest ranking: 77 (15 March 1998)

Number of wins by tour
- Japan Golf Tour: 11
- Other: 6

Best results in major championships
- Masters Tournament: T41: 1994
- PGA Championship: T75: 1994
- U.S. Open: CUT: 1994
- The Open Championship: T60: 1994

Achievements and awards
- PGA of Japan Tour money list winner: 1993

Hajime Meshiai (飯合 肇, Meshiai Hajime; born 12 March 1954) is a Japanese professional golfer.

== Career ==
Meshiai was born in Chiba. He turned professional in 1978. He won 11 tournaments on the Japan Golf Tour and led the money list in 1993. He is 14th on the career money list (through 2013).

== Professional wins (17) ==
=== Japan Golf Tour wins (11) ===
No.	Date	Tournament	Winning score	Margin of victory	Runner(s)-up
1	1 Sep 1985	KBC Augusta	−10 (67-68-71=206)*	1 stroke	(Japan) Isao Aoki, (Japan) Eitaro Deguchi, (Japan) Masashi Ozaki, (Japan) Satsuki Takahashi, (United States) Fuzzy Zoeller
2	13 Apr 1986	Pocari Sweat Open	−7 (71-68-73-65=277)	1 stroke	(Australia) Ian Baker-Finch, (Japan) Nobumitsu Yuhara
3	12 Jul 1987	Hiroshima Open	−13 (70-63-70-72=275)	2 strokes	(Japan) Yoshiyuki Isomura, (Taiwan) Lu Liang-Huan, (Japan) Tadao Nakamura
4	18 Jun 1989	Yomiuri Sapporo Beer Open	−11 (64-71-70=205)*	2 strokes	(Japan) Naomichi Ozaki
5	7 Mar 1993	Token Cup	−12 (68-70-69-69=276)	2 strokes	(United States) Todd Hamilton
6	25 Apr 1993	Dunlop Open^{1}	−13 (69-68-69-69=275)	2 strokes	(Japan) Katsunari Takahashi, (United States) Kevin Wentworth
7	31 Oct 1993	Lark Cup	−5 (73-72-68-70=283)	1 stroke	(Japan) Masahiro Kuramoto, (Japan) Naomichi Ozaki
8	9 Jun 1996	Sapporo Tokyu Open	−9 (70-64-72-73=279)	1 stroke	(Japan) Yoshimitsu Fukuzawa, (Japan) Harumitsu Hamano, (Japan) Yasunori Ida
9	8 Sep 1996	Suntory Open	−16 (68-69-66-69=272)	3 strokes	(Japan) Hidemichi Tanaka
10	15 Mar 1998	Token Corporation Cup (2)	−16 (70-71-67-64=272)	1 stroke	(Japan) Masashi Ozaki
11	26 Sep 1999	Gene Sarazen Jun Classic	−11 (71-66-70-70=277)	Playoff	(Japan) Hirofumi Miyase

*Note: Tournament shortened to 54 holes due to weather.
^{1}Co-sanctioned by the Asia Golf Circuit

Japan Golf Tour playoff record (1–3)

No.	Year	Tournament	Opponent(s)	Result
1	1983	Acom Doubles (with (Japan) Masashi Ozaki)	(Taiwan) Lu Hsi-chuen and (Taiwan) Lu Liang-Huan	Lost to birdie on third extra hole
2	1993	JCB Classic Sendai	(Japan) Yoshi Mizumaki, (Japan) Tsukasa Watanabe	Mizumaki won with birdie on sixth extra hole
3	1993	Yomiuri Sapporo Beer Open	(Japan) Katsuji Hasegawa	Lost to birdie on first extra hole
4	1999	Gene Sarazen Jun Classic	(Japan) Hirofumi Miyase	Won with birdie on first extra hole

=== Other wins (1) ===
- 1986 Acom Team Championship (with Satoshi Higashi)

=== Japan PGA Senior Tour wins (5) ===
- 2005 Kinojo Senior Open
- 2008 Starts Senior Golf Tournament, Akira Kobayashi Invitational Sanko Senior Golf Tournament
- 2009 Fujifilm Senior Championship
- 2016 Kanehide Senior Okinawa Open

== Results in major championships ==
Tournament	1988	1989	1990	1991	1992	1993	1994	1995	1996
Masters Tournament							T41		
U.S. Open							CUT		
The Open Championship	CUT						T60		CUT
PGA Championship							T75		

Did not play

CUT = missed the half-way cut
"T" = tied

== Team appearances ==
- Kirin Cup (representing Japan): 1987
- Dunhill Cup (representing Japan): 1988, 1989, 1990, 1996
- Dynasty Cup (representing Japan): 2003

== See also ==
- List of golfers with most Japan Golf Tour wins
