= Satoshi Higashi =

Japanese professional golfer

Personal information
- Nationality: Japan
- Born: 16 November 1960 (age 65) Tokyo, Japan
- Height: 1.73 m (5 ft 8 in)
- Weight: 75 kg (165 lb; 11.8 st)

Career
- Sport: Golf
- Turned professional: 1983
- Current tour: Japan PGA Senior Tour
- Former tour: Japan Golf Tour
- Professional wins: 13
- Highest ranking: 75 (12 November 1995)

Number of wins by tour
- Japan Golf Tour: 7
- Other: 6

Best results in major championships
- Masters Tournament: CUT: 1996
- PGA Championship: T78: 1996
- U.S. Open: DNP
- The Open Championship: CUT: 1996

Satoshi Higashi (born 16 November 1960) is a Japanese professional golfer.

== Career ==
Higashi won seven tournaments on the Japan Golf Tour and featured in the top 100 of the Official World Golf Rankings.

His most successful year was 1995 when he won four times and finished second on the Japan Golf Tour's money list, also gaining his highest World Ranking of 75th in the same year.

== Professional wins (13) ==
=== PGA of Japan Tour wins (7) ===
No.	Date	Tournament	Winning score	Margin of victory	Runner(s)-up
1	21 Jun 1987	Yomiuri Sapporo Beer Open	−8 (68-67-70-75=280)	1 stroke	(Australia) Graham Marsh, (Japan) Hajime Meshiai
2	15 Jul 1990	Nikkei Cup	−6 (70-74-64-74=282)	1 stroke	(Japan) Nobuo Serizawa
3	19 May 1991	Japan PGA Match-Play Championship Unisys Cup	2 up		(Japan) Tsuneyuki Nakajima
4	2 Apr 1995	Descente Classic Munsingwear Cup	−6 (72-68-69-73=282)	1 stroke	(Japan) Katsuyoshi Tomori
5	16 Apr 1995	Tsuruya Open	−9 (69-74-66-70=279)	1 stroke	(Japan) Kōki Idoki, (Japan) Katsunori Kuwabara, (Australia) Roger Mackay, (Japan) Kiyoshi Maita, (Japan) Yoshi Mizumaki
6	24 Sep 1995	Gene Sarazen Jun Classic	−18 (68-69-65-68=270)	1 stroke	(Japan) Masashi Ozaki
7	12 Nov 1995	Sumitomo Visa Taiheiyo Masters	−14 (70-66-71-67=274)	4 strokes	(Japan) Shigeki Maruyama

PGA of Japan Tour playoff record (0–1)

No.	Year	Tournament	Opponent	Result
1	1991	Mizuno Open	(Australia) Roger Mackay	Lost to par on first extra hole

=== Other wins (2) ===
- 1986 Acom Team Championship (with Hajime Meshiai)
- 1994 Meikyukai Charity Golf Tournament

=== Japan PGA Senior Tour wins (2) ===
No.	Date	Tournament	Winning score	Margin of victory	Runner(s)-up
1	12 Jul 2013	ISPS Handa Cup Philanthropy Senior Tournament	−12 (65-65=130)	3 strokes	(Japan) Nobumitsu Yuhara
2	8 Apr 2023	Kanehide Senior Okinawa Open	−7 (68-70-71=209)	2 strokes	(Japan) Masayoshi Nakayama, (Japan) Hidezumi Shirakata, (Japan) Kaname Yokoo

=== Other senior wins (2) ===
- 2012 Asahi Ryokuken Cup TVQ Senior Open
- 2015 Trust Park Cup Sasebo Senior Open

== Team appearances ==
- Dunhill Cup (representing Japan): 1990
- World Cup (representing Japan): 1991
