= Tsuyoshi Yoneyama =

Japanese golfer

Personal information
- Nationality: Japan
- Born: 15 March 1965 (age 61) Kanagawa Prefecture, Japan
- Height: 1.74 m (5 ft 9 in)
- Weight: 73 kg (161 lb; 11.5 st)

Career
- Sport: Golf
- Turned professional: 1987
- Former tour: Japan Golf Tour
- Professional wins: 6
- Highest ranking: 87 (23 January 2000)

Number of wins by tour
- Japan Golf Tour: 3
- Other: 3

Best results in major championships
- Masters Tournament: DNP
- PGA Championship: DNP
- U.S. Open: DNP
- The Open Championship: T15: 1999
Medal record
Asian Games
Silver medal – second place	1986 Seoul	Men's team

Tsuyoshi Yoneyama (米山 剛, Yoneyama Tsuyoshi; born 15 March 1965) is a Japanese professional golfer.

== Early life ==
Yoneyama was born in Kanagawa Prefecture.

== Professional career ==
Yoneyama has won three tournaments on the Japan Golf Tour and featured in the top 100 of the Official World Golf Ranking. His most successful year was 1999 when he won three times and finished tied 15th in The Open Championship.

== Professional wins (6) ==
=== Japan Golf Tour wins (3) ===
No.	Date	Tournament	Winning score	Margin of victory	Runner-up
1	30 May 1999	Mitsubishi Motors Tournament	−16 (69-69-66-64=268)	Playoff	(Japan) Kazuhiko Hosokawa
2	29 Aug 1999	Hisamitsu-KBC Augusta	−11 (70-66-69=205) (Note: Shortened to 54 holes due to weather.)	1 stroke	(Japan) Takao Nogami
3	28 Nov 1999	Casio World Open	−14 (70-71-68-65=274)	1 stroke	(Japan) Taichi Teshima

Japan Golf Tour playoff record (1–1)

No.	Year	Tournament	Opponent(s)	Result
1	1999	Descente Classic Munsingwear Cup	(Japan) Kazuhiko Hosokawa, (Japan) Masayuki Kawamura	Kawamura won with birdie on second extra hole
2	1999	Mitsubishi Motors Tournament	(Japan) Kazuhiko Hosokawa	Won with birdie on fifth extra hole

=== Japan PGA Senior Tour wins (3) ===
No.	Date	Tournament	Winning score	Margin of victory	Runner(s)-up
1	20 Aug 2017	Fancl Classic	−7 (69-73-67=209)	Playoff	(Australia) Steven Conran, (South Korea) Kim Jong-duck, (Japan) Kiyoshi Maita, (Japan) Yoichi Shimizu
2	25 Aug 2017	Hiroshima Senior Golf Tournament	−14 (69-73-67=128)	3 strokes	(Japan) Katsumi Kubo
3	7 Oct 2018	Japan PGA Senior Championship Sumitomo Corporation Summit Cup	−21 (69-66-66-66=267)	4 strokes	(Japan) Toru Suzuki, (Thailand) Thaworn Wiratchant

== Results in major championships ==
Tournament	1999	2000
The Open Championship	T15	T41

Note: Yoneyama only played in The Open Championship.
"T" = tied

== Team appearances ==
- Alfred Dunhill Cup (representing Japan): 1993, 1999
