= Taichi Teshima =

Japanese professional golfer (born 1968)

Taichi Teshima 手嶋多一
Personal information
- Nationality: Japan
- Born: 16 October 1968 (age 58) Tagawa, Fukuoka, Japan
- Height: 1.72 m (5 ft 8 in)
- Weight: 70 kg (154 lb; 11 st 0 lb)

Career
- Sport: Golf
- College: East Tennessee State University
- Turned professional: 1993
- Current tours: Japan Golf Tour; Japan PGA Senior Tour
- Former tour: European Tour
- Professional wins: 14
- Highest ranking: 66 (6 January 2002)

Number of wins by tour
- Japan Golf Tour: 8
- Other: 6

Best results in major championships
- Masters Tournament: DNP
- PGA Championship: CUT: 2002
- U.S. Open: DNP
- The Open Championship: CUT: 2001, 2002, 2015

Taichi Teshima (Japanese: 手嶋多一, born 16 October 1968) is a Japanese professional golfer.

== Career ==
Teshima was born in Fukuoka. He has won eight tournaments on the Japan Golf Tour, and featured in the top 100 of the Official World Golf Rankings. He played on the European Tour in 2007 after coming through qualifying school but failed to retain his card, finishing outside the top 150 of the Order of Merit.

== Professional wins (14) ==
=== Japan Golf Tour wins (8) ===
Legend
Flagship events (1)
Japan majors (2) (Note: The 2001 Japan Open Golf Championship was also a Japan major championship.)
Other Japan Golf Tour (6)

No.	Date	Tournament	Winning score	Margin of victory	Runner(s)-up
1	12 Dec 1999	Fancl Okinawa Open	−13 (68-69-68-66=271)	Playoff	(Japan) Seiki Okuda
2	14 Oct 2001	Japan Open Golf Championship	−7 (68-72-67-70=277)	4 strokes	(Japan) Tsuyoshi Yoneyama
3	3 Aug 2003	Aiful Cup	−19 (67-64-70-68=269)	Playoff	(Japan) Katsumasa Miyamoto
4	27 Aug 2006	Under Armour KBC Augusta	−16 (71-66-65-66=268)	1 stroke	(Japan) Tetsuji Hiratsuka
5	22 Oct 2006	Bridgestone Open	−22 (70-65-63-68=266)	5 strokes	(Japan) Kiyoshi Maita
6	25 Nov 2007	Casio World Open	−13 (69-68-73-65=275)	1 stroke	(Australia) Chris Campbell
7	8 Jun 2014	Japan PGA Championship Nissin Cupnoodles Cup	−9 (71-68-69-71=279)	1 stroke	(South Korea) Lee Kyoung-hoon, (Japan) Koumei Oda
8	31 May 2015	Gateway to The Open Mizuno Open	−15 (69-69-66-69=273)	2 strokes	(Australia) Scott Strange

Japan Golf Tour playoff record (2–4)

No.	Year	Tournament	Opponent(s)	Result
1	1996	Hisamitsu-KBC Augusta	(Japan) Masashi Ozaki	Lost to par on second extra hole
2	1999	Fancl Okinawa Open	(Japan) Seiki Okuda	Won with birdie on first extra hole
3	2001	Dunlop Phoenix Tournament	(United States) David Duval	Lost to birdie on first extra hole
4	2003	Aiful Cup	(Japan) Katsumasa Miyamoto	Won with birdie on first extra hole
5	2003	Sun Chlorella Classic	(Australia) Brendan Jones, (Japan) Daisuke Maruyama	Jones won with birdie on first extra hole
6	2006	Acom International	(Japan) Mamo Osanai	Lost to par on first extra hole

=== Japan Challenge Tour wins (2) ===
- 1995 Sanko 72 Open, Korakuen Cup (4th)

=== Other wins (1) ===
- 2019 Kyusyu Open

=== Japan PGA Senior Tour wins (3) ===
No.	Date	Tournament	Winning score	Margin of victory	Runner-up
1	13 Apr 2019	Kanehide Senior Okinawa Open	−9 (67-68=135)	1 stroke	(Japan) Masayuki Kawamura
2	19 Sep 2021	Japan Senior Open Golf Championship	−19 (68-66-65-66=265)	8 strokes	(Japan) Katsunori Kuwabara
3	23 Nov 2025	Iwasaki Shiratsuyu Senior	−12 (71-64-69=204)	Playoff	(Thailand) Thammanoon Sriroj

== Results in major championships ==
Tournament	2001	2002	2003	2004	2005	2006	2007	2008	2009	2010	2011	2012	2013	2014	2015
The Open Championship	CUT	CUT													CUT
PGA Championship		CUT													

Note: Teshima never played in the Masters Tournament or the U.S. Open.

Did not play

CUT = missed the half-way cut

== Results in World Golf Championships ==
Tournament	2003
Match Play	
Championship	T51
Invitational	

Did not play

"T" = Tied

== Team appearances ==
- World Cup (representing Japan): 1997
- Dynasty Cup (representing Japan): 2003

== See also ==
- 2006 European Tour Qualifying School graduates
