= Tsukasa Watanabe =

Japanese professional golfer

Tsukasa Watanabe 渡辺司
Personal information
- Nationality: Japan
- Born: 16 February 1957 (age 69) Tokyo, Japan
- Height: 1.77 m (5 ft 10 in)
- Weight: 67 kg (148 lb; 10.6 st)

Career
- Sport: Golf
- Turned professional: 1981
- Former tour: Japan Golf Tour
- Professional wins: 8
- Highest ranking: 80 (14 August 1994)

Number of wins by tour
- Japan Golf Tour: 2
- Other: 6

Best results in major championships
- Masters Tournament: DNP
- PGA Championship: DNP
- U.S. Open: DNP
- The Open Championship: T51: 1994

Tsukasa Watanabe (Japanese: 渡辺司, born 16 February 1957) is a Japanese professional golfer.

== Career ==
Watanabe was born in Tokyo. He played on the Japan Golf Tour, winning twice, and earned over 780,000,000 ¥.

He played on the 1994 International Team in the Presidents Cup.

== Professional wins (8) ==
=== PGA of Japan Tour wins (2) ===
No.	Date	Tournament	Winning score	Margin of victory	Runner(s)-up
1	7 Nov 1993	Daiwa International	−10 (68-72-64-70=274)	1 stroke	(Taiwan) Chen Tze-chung, (United States) Tom Kite
2	19 Jun 1994	Yomiuri Open	−14 (68-64-67-71=270)	2 strokes	(Australia) Anthony Gilligan

PGA of Japan Tour playoff record (0–3)

No.	Year	Tournament	Opponent(s)	Result
1	1990	Chushikoku Open	(Japan) Masayuki Kawamura, (Japan) Seiki Okuda	
2	1993	JCB Classic Sendai	(Japan) Hajime Meshiai, (Japan) Yoshi Mizumaki	Mizumaki won with birdie on sixth extra hole
3	1997	Nikkei Cup Torakichi Nakamura Memorial	(Taiwan) Yeh Chang-ting	Lost to par on second extra hole

=== Other wins (1) ===
- 1993 Sanko Grand Summer Championship

=== Japan PGA Senior Tour wins (5) ===
- 2008 Japan PGA Senior Championship, Fujifilm Senior Championship
- 2009 Japan Senior Open
- 2013 Japan PGA Senior Championship
- 2015 Fuji Film Senior Championship

== Results in major championships ==
Tournament	1994
The Open Championship	T51

Note: Watanabe only played in The Open Championship.
"T" = tied

== Team appearances ==
This list may be incomplete.

- Four Tours World Championship (representing Japan): 1991
- Presidents Cup (International Team): 1994
- Alfred Dunhill Cup (representing Japan): 1995, 1997, 2000
