= Roger Mackay =

Australian professional golfer

Personal information
- Full name: Roger J. Mackay
- Nationality: Australia
- Born: 31 March 1956
- Died: 17 June 2002 (aged 46)
- Height: 1.75 m (5 ft 9 in)
- Weight: 72 kg (159 lb; 11.3 st)

Career
- Sport: Golf
- Turned professional: 1983
- Former tours: Japan Golf Tour; PGA Tour of Australasia
- Professional wins: 13
- Highest ranking: 64 (5 April 1992)

Number of wins by tour
- Japan Golf Tour: 8
- PGA Tour of Australasia: 2
- Other: 5

Best results in major championships
- Masters Tournament: DNP
- PGA Championship: T66: 1992
- U.S. Open: DNP
- The Open Championship: T51: 1992

Roger J. Mackay (31 March 1956 – 17 June 2002) was an Australian professional golfer.

== Career ==
Mackay was educated at Christ Church Grammar School and graduated from the University of Western Australia.

Mackay was one of Australia's leading amateur players through his 20s winning the Western Australian Amateur championship in consecutive seasons in 1979 and 1980, and the Australian Amateur championship in 1980.

In 1983, after struggling to find work in his chosen field as a geologist, Mackay turned professional and was named Rookie of the Year on the PGA Tour of Australia in his first season as a professional.

A near-fatal car accident in 1985 left him with serious recurrent back problems that restricted his ability to play as regularly as most of his peers, and also curtailed his pre-round warm-up preparations, which were typically limited to a few chips and putts to guard against his back stiffening up.

His first major breakthrough as a professional golfer came at the 1987 Victorian Open at Kingston Heath Golf Club where he secured a wire-to-wire win by one shot over then world number one Greg Norman, who he played alongside for the final two rounds. His opening round 66 featured an albatross on the par 5 14th, which has been commemorated with a plaque marking the spot from where he holed his 3 wood second shot.

Later in the 1987 season, he won his first 'Australian major', the Australian PGA Championship at Riverside Oaks. He finished second on the 1987 PGA Tour of Australia order of merit, qualifying alongside Peter Senior (who finished first on the order of merit) to represent Australia in the 1988 World Cup of Golf.

Mackay followed up his strong 1987 season with another impressive season on the PGA Tour of Australia in 1988, finishing third on the order of merit. His season highlight was his runner-up finish at the Australian Masters, where he birdied the final hole to qualify for a playoff (alongside Ian Baker-Finch and Craig Parry) which Ian Baker-Finch ultimately won with a birdie on the first playoff hole.

Mackay set a new course record 63 at Royal Melbourne Golf Club in the second round of the 1988 World Cup of Golf, highlighted by only 23 putts, vaulting the Australian team of Peter Senior & Roger Mackay into the lead at the halfway mark of the tournament. Ultimately, the Australian team finished in a creditable third place, 2 shots behind the victorious USA team of Ben Crenshaw & Mark McCumber.

From 1989, Mackay focused his career on the Japan Golf Tour, and established himself as one of the leading foreign players on the tour, winning 8 times over the next 6 years.

His most successful season in Japan was 1991 where he won 3 times (including the Taiheiyo Masters, one of the tour's flagship 'international events'), was second twice, and had five other top 10 finishes from only 22 starts to ultimately finish second on the money list to Naomichi 'Joe' Ozaki who played 7 more events that season. Japan's three greatest players of the 20th century (Tsuneyuki 'Tommy' Nakajima, Masashi 'Jumbo' Ozaki and Isao Aoki) finished immediately behind him on the money list, highlighting the strength of his season during what was arguably the golden era of the Japanese tour.

In 1991, Mackay represented the PGA Tour of Australasia team that finished runner-up to the European team in the Four Tours World Championship at Royal Adelaide Golf Club. He was his team's only undefeated player during the event, winning 3 of his 4 matches including his match against Steven Richardson in the final, and halving his other match.

His outstanding 1991 season was recognised in his home state of Western Australia in 1992 where he was named Western Australian Sports Star of the Year.

After the 1992 season, his back problems limited his ability to compete regularly and limited his tournament appearances to no more than 19 events in a season. Despite this, Mackay won two more tournaments and was runner-up four times on the Japanese tour during 1993-95, before his back problems more significantly limited his appearances and performances.

Mackay last played professional golf in 2001.

Mackay played a key role, alongside Michael Coate, in the design and construction of two of the most highly rated courses built in Western Australia during the 1990s, Links Kennedy Bay and Araluen.

== Personal life ==
Mackay died in Perth at the age of 46 in 2002 as a result of lymphoma. He was survived by his wife, two sons and a daughter.

== Awards and honors ==
- In 1983, he was named Rookie of the Year on the PGA Tour of Australasia.
- In 1991, he was named Western Australian Sports Star of the Year.

== Amateur wins ==
- 1979 Western Australian Amateur
- 1980 Western Australian Amateur, Australian Amateur

== Professional wins (15) ==
=== PGA of Japan Tour wins (8) ===
No.	Date	Tournament	Winning score	Margin of victory	Runner(s)-up
1	22 Oct 1989	Bridgestone Open	−11 (66-70-68-73=277)	1 stroke	(Japan) Yoshitaka Yamamoto
2	3 Jun 1990	JCB Classic Sendai	−15 (73-64-66-66=269)	1 stroke	(Australia) Graham Marsh, (Japan) Tsuyoshi Yoneyama
3	28 Apr 1991	Dunlop Open^{1}	−16 (69-67-68-68=272)	1 stroke	(Japan) Teruo Sugihara
4	30 Jun 1991	Mizuno Open	−9 (66-70-71=207) (Note: Shortened to 54 holes due to weather.)	Playoff	(Japan) Satoshi Higashi
5	17 Nov 1991	Visa Taiheiyo Club Masters	−16 (70-69-65-68=272)	2 strokes	(Japan) Yoshinori Kaneko
6	7 Jun 1992	JCB Classic Sendai (2)	−13 (71-64-71-65=271)	6 strokes	(England) Paul Hoad
7	4 Jul 1993	PGA Philanthropy Tournament	−10 (71-71-68-68=278)	1 stroke	(United States) Brian Watts
8	1 May 1994	The Crowns	−11 (64-67-67-71=269)	2 strokes	(Japan) Naomichi Ozaki

^{1}Co-sanctioned by the Asia Golf Circuit

PGA of Japan Tour playoff record (1–0)

No.	Year	Tournament	Opponent	Result
1	1991	Mizuno Open	(Japan) Satoshi Higashi	Won with par on first extra hole

=== PGA Tour of Australia wins (2) ===
No.	Date	Tournament	Winning score	Margin of victory	Runner-up
1	22 Feb 1987	Robert Boyd Transport Victorian Open	−11 (66-70-73-68=277)	1 stroke	(Australia) Greg Norman
2	1 Nov 1987	ESP Australian PGA Championship	−8 (68-72-74-70=284)	1 stroke	(United States) Mike Colandro

PGA Tour of Australia playoff record (0–2)

No.	Year	Tournament	Opponent(s)	Result
1	1980	Channel 9 Nedlands Masters (as an amateur)	(Australia) Chris Tickner	Lost to par on first extra hole
2	1988	Australian Masters	(Australia) Ian Baker-Finch, (Australia) Craig Parry	Baker-Finch won with birdie on first extra hole

=== Other wins (5) ===
- 1983 Spalding Park Open (as an amateur)
- 1984 American Samoan Open
- 1986 Paratonga Open, Western Australia PGA Championship, Spalding Park Open

== Results in major championships ==
Tournament	1988	1989	1990	1991	1992
The Open Championship	CUT				T51
PGA Championship					T66

Did not play

CUT = missed the half-way cut
"T" = tied
Note: Mackay only played in The Open Championship and the PGA Championship.

== Team appearances ==
Amateur

- Sloan Morpeth Trophy (representing Australia): 1982 (tied)

Professional

- World Cup (representing Australia): 1988
- Four Tours World Championship (representing Australasia): 1991
