= Chushikoku Open =

Golf tournament in Japan

The Chushikoku Open is a golf tournament which was on the Japan Golf Tour from 1973 to 1991. It was first played in 1971. The event is usually held in September at a variety of courses in Southern Honshu and on Shikoku island.

== Winners ==
this list is incomplete

- 2026 Shota Yoshimoto
- 2025 Shota Yoshimoto
- 2024 Keigo Kaneoka
- 2023 Syuto Sakamoto
- 2022 Masashi Sakikawa
- 2021 Yuki Ishikawa
- 2020 Katsufumi Okino
- 2019 Yasuki Hiramoto
- 2018 Yuki Kono
- 2017 Taro Hiroi
- 2016 Takashi Kanemoto
- 2015 Toshiki Ishitoku (amateur)
- 2014 Masayuki Omiya
- 2013 Satoru Hirota
- 2012 Masayuki Kawamura
- 2011 Ryutaro Kato (amateur´)
- 2010 Masayuki Sunairi
- 2009 Masayuki Kawamura
- 2008 Hiroki Yoshikawa
- 2007 Daisuke Kataoka (amateur)
- 2006 Takeshi Yasukawa
- 2005 Makoto Sueoka
- 2004 Shigeru Harimoto
- 2003
- 2002 Hiroo Okamo
- 2001 Takashi Kanemoto
- 2000 Takashi Kanemoto
- 1999 Hirooki Kokkawa
- 1998 Yoshikazu Sakamoto
- 1997 Hidezumi Shirakata
- 1996 Yosuke Tamaru
- 1995 Yoshikazu Sakamoto
- 1994 Hidezumi Shirakata
- 1993 Yoshikazu Sakamoto
- 1992 Masayuki Kawamura
- 1991 Kosei Miyata
- 1990 Seiki Okuda
- 1989 Tadami Ueno
- 1988 Masahiro Kuramoto
- 1987 Masahiro Kuramoto
- 1986 Tadami Ueno
- 1985 Mitoshi Tomita
- 1984 Masahiro Kuramoto
- 1983 Masahiro Kuramoto
- 1982 Masahiro Kuramoto
- 1981 Masahiro Kuramoto
- 1980 Masahiro Kuramoto (amateur)
- 1979 Hideto Shigenobu
- 1978 Seiji Katayama
- 1977 Tadami Ueno
- 1976 Tadami Ueno
- 1975 Tadami Ueno
- 1974 Mitsuhiko Masuda
- 1973 Mitsuhiko Masuda
- 1972 Kenji Hosoishi
- 1971 Yusuke Shimoyama
