= Kirin Open =

Asia Pacific Open Golf Championship Kirin Open
Tournament information
- Location: Ibaraki, Ibaraki, Japan
- Established: 1972
- Course: Ibaraki Golf Club
- Par: 71
- Length: 7,049 yards (6,446 m)
- Tours: Asia Golf Circuit; Japan Golf Tour
- Format: Stroke play
- Prize fund: ¥100,000,000
- Month played: April
- Final year: 2001

Tournament record score
- Aggregate: 265 Kuo Chie-Hsiung (1978)
- To par: −23 as above

Final champion
- (Japan) Shingo Katayama
- Location in Japan Location in the Ibaraki Prefecture

The Kirin Open was a golf tournament in Japan. It was founded in 1972 as the season ending event on the Asia Golf Circuit, replacing the Yomiuri International which had been cancelled when sponsors decided to discontinue the event. It was also a fixture on the Japan Golf Tour from 1974 until 2001.

It was played at Sobu Country Club in Inzai until 1976. In 1977 Dunlop became title sponsors and the tournament was moved to Ibaraki Golf Club in Ibaraki.

== Winners ==
Year	Tour(s) (Note: AGC − Asia Golf Circuit; JPN − Japan Golf Tour.)	Winner	Score	To par	Margin of victory	Runner(s)-up	Ref.
Asia Pacific Open Golf Championship Kirin Open
2001	JPN	(Japan) Shingo Katayama (2)	271	−13	6 strokes	(Japan) Hajime Meshiai	
2000	JPN	(Japan) Shingo Katayama	280	−4	2 strokes	(Taiwan) Lin Keng-chi (Australia) Peter Senior (Australia) Andre Stolz	
Kirin Open
1999	AGC, JPN	(South Korea) K. J. Choi	204 (Note: Shortened to 54 holes due to rain.)	−9	Playoff (Note: Choi won on the first hole of a sudden death playoff.)	(India) Jeev Milkha Singh	
1998	AGC, JPN	(Philippines) Frankie Miñoza (2)	279	−5	1 stroke	(Japan) Hidemichi Tanaka (Japan) Tsukasa Watanabe (United States) Brian Watts	
1997	AGC, JPN	(South Korea) Kim Jong-duck	278	−10	2 strokes	(Japan) Shigeki Maruyama (Japan) Hirofumi Miyase (Japan) Tateo Ozaki (United States) Brian Watts	
1996	AGC, JPN	(Japan) Yoshinori Kaneko	278	−10	1 stroke	(Japan) Tsuneyuki Nakajima (Japan) Nobuo Serizawa	
Dunlop Open
1995	AGC, JPN	(Australia) Peter Senior	279	−9	5 strokes	(United States) Brian Watts	
1994	AGC, JPN	(Japan) Masashi Ozaki (4)	274	−14	1 stroke	(Taiwan) Hsieh Chin-sheng	
1993	AGC, JPN	(Japan) Hajime Meshiai	275	−13	2 strokes	(Japan) Katsunari Takahashi (United States) Kevin Wentworth	
1992	AGC, JPN	(Japan) Masashi Ozaki (3)	286	−2	Playoff (Note: Ozaki won on the first hole of a sudden death playoff.)	(Canada) Brent Franklin	
1991	AGC, JPN	(Australia) Roger Mackay	272	−16	2 strokes	(Japan) Teruo Sugihara	
1990	AGC, JPN	(Philippines) Frankie Miñoza	205	−11	Playoff (Note: Miñoza won with a birdie on the second hole of a sudden death playoff.)	(Japan) Teruo Sugihara	
1989	AGC, JPN	(Australia) Terry Gale	284	−4	1 stroke	(Taiwan) Chen Tze-ming (Australia) Peter Senior	
1988	AGC, JPN	(Japan) Masashi Ozaki (2)	278	−10	3 strokes	(United States) David Ishii	
Dunlop International Open
1987	AGC, JPN	(Japan) Isao Aoki	277	−11	1 stroke	(Japan) Tsuneyuki Nakajima (Japan) Yoshitaka Yamamoto	
1986	AGC, JPN	(Japan) Hideto Shigenobu	281	−7	2 strokes	(United States) David Ishii (Japan) Masahiro Kuramoto	
1985	AGC, JPN	(Taiwan) Chen Tze-chung	277	−11	1 stroke	(Japan) Tsuneyuki Nakajima	
1984	AGC, JPN	(United States) John Jacobs	283	−5	2 strokes	(Japan) Tateo Ozaki	
1983	AGC, JPN	(United States) Larry Nelson	201	−15	1 stroke	(Japan) Masahiro Kuramoto	
1982	AGC, JPN	(Japan) Tsuneyuki Nakajima	276	−12	5 strokes	(Japan) Saburo Fujiki	
1981	AGC, JPN	(Japan) Kosaku Shimada	286	−2	2 strokes	(United States) Payne Stewart (Japan) Koichi Uehara (Japan) Akira Yabe	
1980	AGC, JPN	(Japan) Masashi Ozaki	277	−11	5 strokes	(Taiwan) Ho Ming-chung (Australia) Graham Marsh	
1979	AGC, JPN	(Japan) Hiroshi Ishii	278	−10	3 strokes	(Japan) Seiji Ebihara (Japan) Tateo Ozaki (Japan) Katsunari Takahashi	
1978	AGC, JPN	(Taiwan) Kuo Chie-Hsiung	265	−23	11 strokes	(United States) Bob Byman	
1977	AGC, JPN	(Philippines) Ben Arda (2)	282	−6	2 strokes	(New Zealand) Terry Kendall (Japan) Tsuneyuki Nakajima	
Sobu International Open
1976	AGC, JPN	(Philippines) Ben Arda	277	−11	4 strokes	(Taiwan) Chen Chien-chung	
1975	AGC, JPN	(Japan) Teruo Sugihara	282	−6	2 strokes	(Australia) Ted Ball (Taiwan) Hsu Sheng-san (Japan) Hideyo Sugimoto	
1974	AGC, JPN	(Taiwan) Lu Liang-Huan	280	−8	4 strokes	(Japan) Masashi Ozaki (Japan) Fumio Tanaka	
1973	AGC	(Japan) Shigeru Uchida	279	−9	Playoff (Note: Uchida won with a 180-yard hole-out for eagle on the third hole of a sudden death playoff.)	(Japan) Masashi Ozaki	
1972	AGC	(Taiwan) Hsieh Min-Nan	279	−9	2 strokes	(Philippines) Ben Arda	
