= Suntory Open =

Former Japanese golf tournament

Tournament information
- Location: Inzai, Chiba, Japan
- Established: 1973
- Course: Sobu Country Club
- Par: 70
- Length: 7,143 yards (6,532 m)
- Tour: Japan Golf Tour
- Format: Stroke play
- Prize fund: ¥100,000,000
- Month played: September
- Final year: 2007

Tournament record score
- Aggregate: 266 Yang Yong-eun (2006)
- To par: −20 Yoshitaka Yamamoto (1975)

Final champion
- (Japan) Hideto Tanihara
- Location in Japan Location in the Chiba Prefecture

The Suntory Open was a professional golf tournament on the Japan Golf Tour. It was founded in 1973 by Suntory, when it was held at the Ashitaka 600 club. The following year it was held at Narashino Country Club. It remained at Narashino until 1998, when it moved to Sobu Country Club.

The prize fund for the final tournament in 2007 was ¥100,000,000 with ¥20,000,000 going to the winner.

== Tournament hosts ==
Year(s)	Host course	Location
1998–2007	Sobu Country Club	Inzai, Chiba
1974–1997	Narashino Country Club	Inzai, Chiba
1973	Ashitaka 600 Club	Numazu, Shizuoka

== Winners ==
Year	Winner	Score	To par	Margin of victory	Runner(s)-up	Ref.
2007	(Japan) Hideto Tanihara	202 (Note: Shortened to 54 holes due to weather.)	−8	2 strokes	(Japan) Toru Taniguchi	
2006	(South Korea) Yang Yong-eun	266	−14	6 strokes	(Japan) Hidemasa Hoshino (Japan) Toru Taniguchi	
2005	(Japan) Yasuharu Imano	267	−13	2 strokes	(Japan) Mamo Osanai	
2004	(Japan) Hideki Kase	267	−13	3 strokes	(Japan) Tomohiro Kondo (Japan) Katsuya Nakagawa (Japan) Toru Taniguchi	
2003	(India) Jyoti Randhawa	276	−8	2 strokes	(Australia) Paul Sheehan	
2002	(Japan) Shingo Katayama (2)	269	−15	4 strokes	(Japan) Kōki Idoki (Japan) Yasuharu Imano	
2001	(Japan) Shingo Katayama	268	−16	3 strokes	(Northern Ireland) Darren Clarke (Japan) Keiichiro Fukabori (Japan) Nobuo Serizawa	
2000	(Japan) Kiyoshi Maita	273	−11	1 stroke	(Japan) Yasuharu Imano	
1999	(Zimbabwe) Nick Price	276	−8	1 stroke	(Japan) Shigeki Maruyama	
1998	(Japan) Mamo Osanai	274	−10	3 strokes	(Japan) Masashi Ozaki	
1997	(Japan) Hiroyuki Fujita	274	−14	3 strokes	(Japan) Masashi Ozaki	
1996	(Japan) Hajime Meshiai	272	−16	3 strokes	(Japan) Hidemichi Tanaka	
1995	(Japan) Masahiro Kuramoto	273	−15	3 strokes	(Japan) Takaaki Fukuzawa (Japan) Satoshi Higashi (Japan) Nobuo Serizawa	
1994	(United States) David Ishii	277	−11	Playoff	(Japan) Hisayuki Sasaki	
1993	(Japan) Eiichi Itai	282	−6	1 stroke	(Taiwan) Chen Tze-chung	
1992	(Japan) Naomichi Ozaki (2)	279	−9	2 strokes	(Australia) Wayne Grady (Japan) Tateo Ozaki (Japan) Yoshikazu Yokoshima (Japan) Nobumitsu Yuhara	
1991	(Japan) Naomichi Ozaki	276	−12	2 strokes	(Taiwan) Chen Tze-chung	
1990	(Japan) Tōru Nakamura	271	−17	1 stroke	(Australia) Graham Marsh	
1989	(United States) Larry Nelson	276	−12	Playoff	(Japan) Saburo Fujiki	
1988	(Japan) Tateo Ozaki (2)	274	−14	3 strokes	(Japan) Tadami Ueno	
1987	(Japan) Noboru Sugai	278	−10	3 strokes	(Japan) Masahiro Kuramoto (United States) Larry Nelson	
1986	(Australia) Graham Marsh (2)	275	−13	Playoff	(Japan) Isao Aoki	
1985	(Japan) Tateo Ozaki	275	−13	Playoff	(United States) Larry Nelson	
1984	(Japan) Takashi Kurihara	271	−17	2 strokes	(Japan) Isao Aoki	
1983	(Japan) Tsuneyuki Nakajima	274	−14	1 stroke	(Japan) Saburo Fujiki	
1982	(Japan) Pete Izumikawa	207	−9	2 strokes	(United States) Bill Rogers	
1981	(United States) Bill Rogers (2)	270	−18	2 strokes	(Japan) Norio Suzuki	
1980	(United States) Bill Rogers	278	−10	2 strokes	(Australia) Graham Marsh	
1979	(Japan) Masaji Kusakabe (2)	277	−11	1 stroke	(Taiwan) Lu Liang-Huan	
1978	(Japan) Akio Kanemoto	281	−7	1 stroke	(Japan) Isao Aoki	
1977	(Japan) Masaji Kusakabe	279	−9	3 strokes	(Japan) Fujio Kobayashi	
1976	(Australia) Graham Marsh	273	−15	3 strokes	(Japan) Isao Aoki	
1975	(Japan) Yoshitaka Yamamoto	268	−20	2 strokes	(Japan) Masashi Ozaki	
1974	(Japan) Masashi Ozaki	272	−16	3 strokes	(Japan) Kosaku Shimada	
1973	(Japan) Hideyo Sugimoto	270	−14	1 stroke	(Japan) Masashi Ozaki	
