= Woodone Open Hiroshima =

Tournament information
- Location: Higashihiroshima, Hiroshima, Japan
- Established: 1972
- Course: Hiroshima Country Club
- Par: 71
- Length: 6,942 yards (6,348 m)
- Tour: Japan Golf Tour
- Format: Stroke play
- Prize fund: ¥100,000,000
- Month played: July
- Final year: 2007

Tournament record score
- Aggregate: 265 Tetsuji Hiratsuka (2006)
- To par: −22 Shingo Katayama (2004)

Final champion
- (Japan) Toru Taniguchi
- Location in Japan Location in the Hiroshima Prefecture

The Woodone Open Hiroshima was a professional golf tournament in Japan. Founded in 1972 as the Hiroshima Open, it was an event on the Japan Golf Tour from 1973 to 2007. Except for the 1997 tournament, which was held at Yonex Country Club in Niigata Prefecture, and the 1980 tournament, which was held at Kam Country Club in Ichihara, Chiba, it was played at Hiroshima Country Club near Higashihiroshima in Hiroshima Prefecture.

== Winners ==
| Year | Winner | Score | To par | Margin of victory | Runner(s)-up | Ref. |
Woodone Open Hiroshima
| 2007 | (Japan) Toru Taniguchi | 269 | −15 | Playoff (Note: Taniguchi won with a birdie on the first hole of a sudden-death playoff.) | (Thailand) Prayad Marksaeng | |
| 2006 | (Japan) Tetsuji Hiratsuka | 265 | −19 | 2 strokes | (South Korea) Hur Suk-ho (Japan) Shingo Katayama | |
| 2005 | (Japan) Takao Nogami | 270 | −14 | 1 stroke | (Fiji) Dinesh Chand | |
| 2004 | (Japan) Shingo Katayama | 266 | −22 | 5 strokes | (Japan) Ryuichi Oda | |
| 2003 | (Japan) Toshimitsu Izawa | 275 | −13 | Playoff (Note: Izawa won with a par on the first hole of a sudden-death playoff.) | (Japan) Kiyoshi Murota | |
Juken Sangyo Open Hiroshima
| 2002 | (South Korea) Hur Suk-ho | 274 | −14 | 3 strokes | (Japan) Mamo Osanai | |
| 2001 | (Japan) Keiichiro Fukabori (2) | 203 (Note: Shortened to 54 holes due to rain.) | −13 | Playoff (Note: Fukabori won with a par on the first hole of a sudden-death playoff.) | (Japan) Masashi Ozaki | |
| 2000 | (Japan) Keiichiro Fukabori | 275 | −13 | 1 stroke | (Japan) Masashi Ozaki | |
Yonex Open Hiroshima
| 1999 | (Japan) Masashi Ozaki (9) | 273 | −15 | Playoff (Note: Ozaki won with a birdie on the first hole of a sudden-death playoff.) | (Japan) Shigemasa Higaki | |
| 1998 | (Japan) Masashi Ozaki (8) | 270 | −18 | 1 stroke | (Australia) Peter McWhinney | |
| 1997 | (Japan) Naomichi Ozaki | 276 | −12 | 2 strokes | (Japan) Hiroyuki Fujita | |
| 1996 | (Japan) Hideyuki Sato | 273 | −15 | 4 strokes | (Japan) Yoshinori Kaneko | |
| 1995 | (Japan) Masashi Ozaki (7) | 207 | −9 | 1 stroke | (Japan) Satoshi Higashi | |
| 1994 | (Japan) Masashi Ozaki (6) | 274 | −14 | 3 strokes | (Japan) Nobuo Serizawa | |
| 1993 | (Japan) Toshiaki Odate | 275 | −9 | Playoff (Note: Odate won with a birdie on the second hole of a sudden-death playoff.) | (United States) Wayne Levi | |
| 1992 | (Japan) Nobumitsu Yuhara | 275 | −9 | 1 stroke | (Japan) Saburo Fujiki (Japan) Satoshi Higashi (Japan) Kiyoshi Murota | |
| 1991 | (Japan) Eiichi Itai | 272 | −12 | 2 strokes | (Japan) Yoshi Mizumaki (Japan) Tsuyoshi Yoneyama | |
| 1990 | (Japan) Masashi Ozaki (5) | 278 | −10 | 1 stroke | (Japan) Tsuneyuki Nakajima | |
| 1989 | (Japan) Masashi Ozaki (4) | 270 | −18 | 6 strokes | (Japan) Seiji Ebihara (Japan) Seiichi Kanai (Japan) Nobuo Serizawa | |
| 1988 | (Japan) Hajime Matsui | 274 | −14 | 1 stroke | (Japan) Katsuyoshi Tomori | |
Hiroshima Open
| 1987 | (Japan) Hajime Meshiai | 275 | −13 | 2 strokes | (Japan) Yoshiyuki Isomura (Taiwan) Lu Liang-Huan (Japan) Tadao Nakamura | |
| 1986 | (Japan) Tōru Nakamura (2) | 272 | −16 | Playoff | (Japan) Saburo Fujiki | |
| 1985 | (Japan) Yoshitaka Yamamoto (2) | 277 | −11 | 2 strokes | (Japan) Hajime Meshiai (Japan) Tōru Nakamura (Japan) Masashi Ozaki | |
| 1984 | (Japan) Masashi Ozaki (3) | 269 | −15 | 3 strokes | (Japan) Masaji Kusakabe | |
| 1983 | (Japan) Katsunari Takahashi | 273 | −15 | Playoff (Note: Takahashi won with a par on the third hole of a sudden-death playoff.) | (Japan) Tateo Ozaki | |
| 1982 | (Japan) Takashi Kurihara | 272 | −12 | 4 strokes | (Japan) Yutaka Hagawa | |
| 1981 | (Japan) Seiichi Kanai | 202 | −14 | Playoff (Note: Kanai won with a birdie on the first hole of a sudden-death playoff.) | (Taiwan) Lu Hsi-chuen | |
| 1980 | (Japan) Norio Suzuki | 276 | −12 | 4 strokes | (Japan) Isao Aoki (Taiwan) Chen Tze-ming (Japan) Haruo Yasuda | |
| 1979 | (Japan) Yoshitaka Yamamoto | 270 | −18 | 8 strokes | (Japan) Haruo Yasuda (Japan) Yoshikazu Yokoshima | |
| 1978 | (Japan) Masashi Ozaki (2) | 273 | −15 | Playoff | (Japan) Hideyo Sugimoto | |
| 1977 | (Japan) Yasuhiro Miyamoto | 275 | −13 | 1 stroke | (Japan) Masashi Ozaki | |
| 1976 | (Japan) Masashi Ozaki | 200 | −13 | 1 stroke | (Japan) Teruo Sugihara | |
| 1975 | (Taiwan) Lu Liang-Huan (2) | 275 | −13 | Playoff (Note: Lu won a two-hole playoff by two strokes; Lu (E), Nakamura (+2), Shimada (+2).) | (Japan) Tōru Nakamura (Japan) Kosaku Shimada | |
| 1974 | (Taiwan) Lu Liang-Huan | 272 | −16 | 1 stroke | (Japan) Takashi Murakami | |
| 1973 | (Japan) Tōru Nakamura | 269 | −19 | 1 stroke | (Philippines) Iraneo Legaspi | |
| 1972 | (Taiwan) Hsieh Yung-yo | 202 | −14 | 2 strokes | (Japan) Takashi Murakami | |
