= Pocari Sweat Open =

Japanese professional golf tournament (1979–1994)

Tournament information
- Location: Mihara, Hiroshima, Japan
- Established: 1979
- Course: Hakuryuko Country Club
- Par: 71
- Length: 6,780 yards (6,200 m)
- Tour: Japan Golf Tour
- Format: Stroke play
- Prize fund: ¥80,000,000
- Month played: April
- Final year: 1994

Tournament record score
- Aggregate: 274 Yoshiyuki Isomura (1987); 274 Kinpachi Yoshimura (1987); 274 Yoshikazu Yokoshima (1989); 274 Shinji Ikeuchi (1993)
- To par: −10 as above

Final champion
- (Japan) Yoshi Mizumaki
- Location in Japan Location in the Hiroshima Prefecture

The Pocari Sweat Open was a professional golf tournament that was held at Hakuryuko Country Club in Mihara, Hiroshima, Japan from 1979 to 1994. It was an event on the Japan Golf Tour from 1982.

== Winners ==
Year	Winner	Score	To par	Margin of victory	Runner(s)-up	Ref.
Pocari Sweat Open
1994	(Japan) Yoshi Mizumaki	203 (Note: Shortened to 54 holes due to weather.)	−10	1 stroke	(Japan) Tsukasa Watanabe	
1993	(Japan) Shinji Ikeuchi	274	−10	1 stroke	(Japan) Hirofumi Miyase	
1992	(Taiwan) Chen Tze-ming	202	−11	3 strokes	(Japan) Saburo Fujiki (Japan) Yoshinori Kaneko (Japan) Hirofumi Miyase (Japan) Kiyoshi Murota (Japan) Nobuo Serizawa (Japan) Koichi Suzuki (Japan) Akihito Yokoyama	
1991	(Japan) Ryoken Kawagishi	199	−14	4 strokes	(Japan) Hiroshi Makino	
1990	(Japan) Nobumitsu Yuhara	277	−7	2 strokes	(Australia) Wayne Smith	
1989	(Japan) Yoshikazu Yokoshima	274	−10	1 stroke	(Japan) Naomichi Ozaki	
1988	(Australia) Ian Baker-Finch	277	−7	2 strokes	(Australia) Graham Marsh	
1987	(Japan) Kinpachi Yoshimura	274	−10	Playoff	(Japan) Yoshiyuki Isomura	
1986	(Japan) Hajime Meshiai	277	−7	1 stroke	(Australia) Ian Baker-Finch (Japan) Nobumitsu Yuhara	
1985	(Japan) Motomasa Aoki	211	−2	2 strokes	(Japan) Akira Yabe (Japan) Nobumitsu Yuhara	
Hakuryuko Pocari Sweat Open
1984	(Japan) Tateo Ozaki (2)	277	−7	2 strokes	(Japan) Kikuo Arai	
Pocari-Sweat Hakuryuko Open
1983	(Japan) Hiroshi Makino	207	− 6	Playoff	(Japan) Saburo Fujiki (Japan) Shinsaku Maeda (Australia) Graham Marsh	
Hakuryuko Open
1982	(Japan) Toshimitsu Kai	283	−5	4 strokes	(Japan) Tsuneyuki Nakajima	
1981: No tournament
1980	(Japan) Kikuo Arai	208	−8	1 stroke	(Japan) Saburo Fujiki (Japan) Naomichi Ozaki (Japan) Tateo Ozaki	
1979	(Japan) Tateo Ozaki					
