= David Ishii =

American professional golfer (born 1955)

Personal information
- Full name: David S. Ishii
- Nationality: United States
- Born: July 26, 1955 (age 71) Lihue, Hawaii, U.S.
- Height: 1.78 m (5 ft 10 in)
- Weight: 80 kg (176 lb; 12 st 8 lb)

Career
- Sport: Golf
- College: University of Houston
- Turned professional: 1979
- Former tours: PGA Tour; Japan Golf Tour
- Professional wins: 20
- Highest ranking: 18 (May 15, 1988)

Number of wins by tour
- PGA Tour: 1
- Japan Golf Tour: 14
- Other: 5

Best results in major championships
- Masters Tournament: CUT: 1990
- PGA Championship: T38: 1988
- U.S. Open: T36: 1988
- The Open Championship: CUT: 1988

Achievements and awards
- PGA of Japan Tour money list winner: 1987

David S. Ishii (born July 26, 1955) is an American professional golfer of Japanese descent.

== Early life ==
Ishii grew up on the island of Kauai in Hawaii and graduated from Kauai High School. As a junior in high school, he won the Hawaii State High School Championship.

== Amateur career ==
Ishii played his collegiate golf at the University of Houston from 1974 to 1977. He won four individual events, was a member of the 1977 NCAA Championship team, and was a 1977 All-American.

== Professional career ==
He turned professional in 1979. He led the money list on the Japan Golf Tour in 1987. He has 14 victories on the Japan Golf Tour and is 13th on the career money list.

Ishii won the inaugural Kapalua Open in 1982 and also won the 1990 Hawaiian Open, a PGA Tour event. He was the second Hawaiian native to win the event, after Ted Makalena in 1966.

Ishii currently participates on the Japan Senior PGA Tour and opened Ishii Golf Studio in Honolulu, Hawaii.

== Amateur wins ==
- 1977 Manoa Cup (Hawaii State Amateur Match Play Championship)
- 1978 Hawaii Amateur

== Professional wins (20) ==
=== PGA Tour wins (1) ===
| No. | Date | Tournament | Winning score | Margin of victory | Runner-up |
|---|---|---|---|---|---|
| 1 | Feb 11, 1990 | Hawaiian Open | −9 (72-67-68-72=279) | 1 stroke | (United States) Paul Azinger |

=== PGA of Japan Tour wins (14) ===
| No. | Date | Tournament | Winning score | Margin of victory | Runner(s)-up |
|---|---|---|---|---|---|
| 1 | Jun 9, 1985 | Tohoku Classic | −13 (72-63-68-72=275) | 5 strokes | (Japan) Naomichi Ozaki |
| 2 | May 4, 1986 | Chunichi Crowns | −6 (68-67-71-68=274) | 4 strokes | (Japan) Tsuneyuki Nakajima |
| 3 | Aug 3, 1986 | NST Niigata Open | −12 (68-70-66-72=276) | 1 stroke | (Japan) Tateo Ozaki |
| 4 | Jun 14, 1987 | Sapporo Tokyu Open | −12 (67-68-70-71=276) | 3 strokes | (Japan) Tōru Nakamura |
| 5 | Jun 28, 1987 | Mizuno Open | −16 (67-66-69-70=272) | 8 strokes | (Taiwan) Chen Tze-ming, (Japan) Tōru Nakamura |
| 6 | Jul 26, 1987 | Japan PGA Championship | −8 (73-67-69-71=280) | 1 stroke | (Australia) Brian Jones, (Japan) Seiichi Kanai |
| 7 | Oct 25, 1987 | Bridgestone Open | −6 (69-71-72-70=282) | Playoff | (Japan) Hiroshi Makino, (Japan) Nobuo Serizawa |
| 8 | Nov 29, 1987 | Casio World Open | −12 (67-69-73-67=276) | 2 strokes | (Scotland) Sam Torrance |
| 9 | Dec 6, 1987 | Golf Nippon Series | −7 (69-69=138) (Note: Shortened to 36 holes due to weather.) | Shared title with (Japan) Isao Aoki | |
| 10 | May 15, 1988 | Japan PGA Match-Play Championship Unisys Cup | 6 and 5 | | (Japan) Noboru Sugai |
| 11 | Jun 21, 1992 | Yomiuri Sapporo Beer Open | −10 (69-68-71-70=278) | 1 stroke | (Australia) Brian Jones |
| 12 | Mar 21, 1993 | Dydo Shizuoka Open | −13 (68-71-71-65=275) | 3 strokes | (Japan) Hajime Meshiai |
| 13 | Mar 21, 1994 | Maruman Open | −9 (69-71-67-72=279) | Playoff | (Japan) Hirofumi Miyase, (Japan) Nobuo Serizawa |
| 14 | Sep 11, 1994 | Suntory Open | −11 (72-68-69-68=277) | Playoff | (Japan) Hisayuki Sasaki |

PGA of Japan Tour playoff record (3–5)

| No. | Year | Tournament | Opponent(s) | Result |
|---|---|---|---|---|
| 1 | 1983 | Kuzuha Kokusai Tournament | (Japan) Kikuo Arai, (Japan) Teruo Sugihara | Arai won with par on fourth extra hole Sugihara eliminated by par on second hole |
| 2 | 1983 | Chunichi Crowns | (Japan) Kikuo Arai, (Taiwan) Chen Tze-ming | Chen won with par on second extra hole |
| 3 | 1986 | Polaroid Cup Golf Digest Tournament | (Japan) Tsuneyuki Nakajima | Lost to par on fifth extra hole |
| 4 | 1987 | Bridgestone Tournament | (Japan) Hiroshi Makino, (Japan) Nobuo Serizawa | Won with birdie on fifth extra hole Makino eliminated by par on first hole |
| 5 | 1994 | Maruman Open | (Japan) Hirofumi Miyase, (Japan) Nobuo Serizawa | Won with birdie on first extra hole |
| 6 | 1994 | Suntory Open | (Japan) Hisayuki Sasaki | Won with par on first extra hole |
| 7 | 1996 | JCB Classic Sendai | (Japan) Masashi Ozaki | Lost to par on first extra hole |
| 8 | 1996 | Casio World Open | (United States) Paul Stankowski | Lost to birdie on first extra hole |

=== Other wins (4) ===
- 1980 Hawaii State Open
- 1982 Kapalua Open
- 1984 Hawaii State Open
- 1985 Hawaii State Open

=== Senior wins (1) ===
- 2017 Hawaii State Senior Open

== Results in major championships ==
| Tournament | 1988 | 1989 | 1990 |
|---|---|---|---|
| Masters Tournament | | | CUT |
| U.S. Open | T36 | | |
| The Open Championship | CUT | | |
| PGA Championship | T38 | | CUT |

Did not play

CUT = missed the half-way cut
"T" = tied

== Results in The Players Championship ==
| Tournament | 1988 |
|---|---|
| The Players Championship | T60 |

"T" indicates a tie for a place

== Results in senior major championships ==
| Tournament | 2006 | 2007 | 2008 | 2009 | 2010 | 2011 | 2012 | 2013 | 2014 | 2015 |
|---|---|---|---|---|---|---|---|---|---|---|
| Senior PGA Championship | CUT | CUT | CUT | | | | | | | |
| U.S. Senior Open | CUT | | CUT | | | | | | CUT | CUT |
| Senior British Open Championship | CUT | | | | | | | | | |

Did not play

CUT = missed the halfway cut
Note: Ishii never played in The Tradition or the Senior Players Championship.

== See also ==
- List of golfers with most Japan Golf Tour wins
