= KBC Augusta =

Golf tournament in Japan

Sansan KBC Augusta
Tournament information
- Location: Itoshima, Fukuoka, Japan
- Established: 1973
- Course: Keya Golf Club
- Par: 72
- Length: 7,103 yards (6,495 m)
- Tour: Japan Golf Tour
- Format: Stroke play
- Prize fund: ¥100,000,000
- Month played: August

Tournament record score
- Aggregate: 262 Kazuki Higa (2019)
- To par: −26 as above

Current champion
- (South Korea) Lee Sang-hee

Location map
- Location in Japan Location in the Fukuoka Prefecture

The KBC Augusta is a professional golf tournament that is held in Fukuoka Prefecture, Japan. The title sponsor is the Kyushu Asahi Broadcasting and it is held in August. Since its foundation in 1973, it has been an event on the Japan Golf Tour.

Since 1992, the KBC Augusta has been played at Keya Golf Club near Itoshima. Before then it was played at Fukuoka Country Club (Wajiro Course) near Fukuoka until 1982 and then at Kyushu Shima Country Club near Itoshima between 1983 and 1991. The tournament scoring records are 262 (aggregate) and −26 (to par) set by Kazuki Higa in 2019.

The 2021 purse was ¥100,000,000, with ¥20,000,000 going to the winner.

== Tournament hosts ==
Year(s)	Host course	Location
1992–present	Keya Golf Club	Itoshima, Fukuoka
1983–1991	Kyushu Shima Country Club	Itoshima, Fukuoka
1973–1982	Fukuoka Country Club (Wajiro Course)	Fukuoka, Fukuoka

== Winners ==
Year	Winner	Score	To Par	Margin of victory	Runner(s)-up	Ref.
Sansan KBC Augusta
2026	(South Korea) Lee Sang-hee	265	−23	3 strokes	(Japan) Yusaku Hosono	
2025	(Japan) Yuwa Kosaihira	270	−18	1 stroke	(Japan) Yusuke Sakamoto	
2024	(Japan) Jinichiro Kozuma	269	−19	Playoff	(Japan) Yuwa Kosaihira	
2023	(South Korea) Song Young-han	271	−17	1 stroke	(Japan) Ryutaro Nagano	
2022	(Japan) Riki Kawamoto	272	−16	1 stroke	(South Korea) Lee Sang-hee	
2021	(Zimbabwe) Scott Vincent	271	−17	1 stroke	(Japan) Ryo Ishikawa	
RIZAP KBC Augusta
2020	Cancelled due to the COVID-19 pandemic					
2019	(Japan) Kazuki Higa	262	−26	5 strokes	(Japan) Rikuya Hoshino	
2018	(Japan) Daijiro Izumida	274	−14	1 stroke	(South Korea) Choi Ho-sung	
2017	(Japan) Yuta Ikeda (3)	270	−18	3 strokes	(Japan) Kunihiro Kamii	
2016	(Japan) Ryo Ishikawa	273	−15	5 strokes	(New Zealand) Michael Hendry (Australia) Brad Kennedy (Japan) Tadahiro Takayama	
2015	(Japan) Yuta Ikeda (2)	268	−20	5 strokes	(Japan) Koumei Oda	
RZ Everlasting KBC Augusta
2014	(Japan) Hiroyuki Fujita	276	−12	Playoff	(China) Liang Wenchong	
Vana H Cup KBC Augusta
2013	(South Korea) Park Sung-joon	204 (Note: Shortened to 54 holes due to weather.)	−12	2 strokes	(South Korea) Hwang Jung-gon	
2012	(South Korea) Kim Hyung-sung	270	−22	1 stroke	(Japan) Akio Sadakata	
2011	(South Korea) Bae Sang-moon	266	−22	2 strokes	(Japan) Ryo Ishikawa (Japan) Tomohiro Kondo	
2010	(Japan) Hideto Tanihara	266	−22	1 stroke	(Japan) Mitsuhiro Tateyama	
2009	(Japan) Yuta Ikeda	267	−21	Playoff	(Japan) Yasuharu Imano	
2008	(Japan) Shintaro Kai	278	−10	1 stroke	(Japan) Hidemasa Hoshino	
KBC Augusta
2007	(Japan) Katsumasa Miyamoto	269	−15	1 stroke	(Australia) Steven Conran (Japan) Koumei Oda	
Under Armour KBC Augusta
2006	(Japan) Taichi Teshima	268	−16	1 stroke	(Japan) Tetsuji Hiratsuka	
2005	(Japan) Toshimitsu Izawa (2)	264	−20	5 strokes	(Thailand) Prayad Marksaeng (Japan) Ryuichi Oda	
Hisamitsu-KBC Augusta
2004	(Australia) Steven Conran	277	−7	1 stroke	(Japan) Takashi Kamiyama (Japan) Toru Taniguchi	
2003	(Japan) Soushi Tajima	269	−19	4 strokes	(Fiji) Dinesh Chand (Japan) Hisayuki Sasaki	
2002	(Japan) Nobumitsu Yuhara	209	−7	1 stroke	(Japan) Shigemasa Higaki (Japan) Katsunori Kuwabara (Japan) Toshimasa Nakajima (United States) Christian Peña (China) Zhang Lianwei	
2001	(Japan) Takenori Hiraishi	273	−15	Playoff	(Japan) Shigemasa Higaki (Japan) Hideki Kase	
2000	(Japan) Toshimitsu Izawa	270	−18	4 strokes	(Japan) Shusaku Sugimoto	
1999	(Japan) Tsuyoshi Yoneyama	205	−11	1 stroke	(Japan) Takao Nogami	
1998	(Japan) Masashi Ozaki (4)	275	−13	4 strokes	(Japan) Katsunori Kuwabara	
1997	(Japan) Masashi Ozaki (3)	266	−22	12 strokes	(Japan) Takaaki Fukuzawa (Japan) Taichi Teshima	
1996	(Japan) Masashi Ozaki (2)	273	−15	Playoff	(Japan) Taichi Teshima	
1995	(Japan) Kazuhiko Hosokawa	271	−17	1 stroke	(United States) Todd Hamilton (Japan) Tomohiro Maruyama	
1994	(United States) Brian Watts	271	−17	2 strokes	(Japan) Masashi Ozaki	
Daiwa KBC Augusta
1993	(Taiwan) Chen Tze-chung	277	−11	Playoff	(Taiwan) Lin Chie-hsiang	
1992	(Taiwan) Chen Tze-ming (2)	276	−12	Playoff	(Australia) Bradley Hughes (Japan) Norikazu Kawakami	
1991	(United States) Raymond Floyd	273	−15	1 stroke	(Philippines) Frankie Miñoza	
1990	(Japan) Masashi Ozaki	269	−19	10 strokes	(Taiwan) Chen Tze-chung	
1989	(Japan) Teruo Sugihara	281	−7	2 strokes	(Australia) Graham Marsh	
KBC Augusta
1988	(Japan) Masahiro Kuramoto	276	−12	2 strokes	(Japan) Hajime Meshiai (Japan) Masashi Ozaki (Japan) Nobumitsu Yuhara	
1987	(Japan) Saburo Fujiki (2)	274	−14	2 strokes	(Japan) Tateo Ozaki	
1986	(Japan) Isao Aoki (3)	282	−6	1 stroke	(Japan) Masahiro Kuramoto (Japan) Masashi Ozaki	
1985	(Japan) Hajime Meshiai	206	−10	1 stroke	(Japan) Isao Aoki (Japan) Eitaro Deguchi (Japan) Masashi Ozaki (Japan) Satsuki Takahashi (United States) Fuzzy Zoeller	
1984	(Japan) Naomichi Ozaki	275	−13	1 stroke	(Japan) Kouichi Inoue (Japan) Tsuneyuki Nakajima	
1983	(Japan) Saburo Fujiki	273	−15	3 strokes	(Japan) Masashi Ozaki	
1982	(Taiwan) Chen Tze-ming	209	−7	1 stroke	(United States) Hal Sutton	
1981	(Taiwan) Hsieh Min-Nan	279	−9	Playoff	(Taiwan) Chen Tze-chung (Japan) Nobumitsu Yuhara	
1980	(Japan) Isao Aoki (2)	137 (Note: Shortened to 36 holes due to rain.)	−7	2 strokes	(Japan) Hiroshi Tahara	
1979	(Japan) Masaji Kusakabe	240 (Note: Shortened to 63 holes after a typhoon caused the final round to be cut to nine holes.)	−12	3 strokes	(Taiwan) Kuo Chie-Hsiung	
1978	(Japan) Kenichi Yamada	276	−12	2 strokes	(Japan) Isao Aoki (Japan) Shiro Kubo (United States) Gene Littler (Japan) Yasuhiro Miyamoto	
1977	(Australia) Brian Jones	278	−10	Playoff	(Japan) Akira Yabe	
1976	(Australia) Graham Marsh	207	−9	Playoff	(Japan) Haruo Yasuda	
1975	(Japan) Shinsaku Maeda	278	−10	Playoff	(Japan) Hiroshi Ishii	
1974	(Japan) Tōru Nakamura	273	−15	1 stroke	(Japan) Teruo Sugihara	
1973	(Japan) Isao Aoki	266	−22	13 strokes	(Japan) Yasuhiro Miyamoto	
