= Kikuo Arai =

Japanese professional golfer

Kikuo Arai 新井規矩雄
Personal information
- Nationality: Japan
- Born: 11 December 1943 (age 82) Saitama Prefecture, Japan
- Height: 1.70 m (5 ft 7 in)
- Weight: 75 kg (165 lb; 11.8 st)

Career
- Sport: Golf
- Status: Professional
- Former tours: Japan Golf Tour; PGA Tour; Champions Tour
- Professional wins: 19

Number of wins by tour
- Japan Golf Tour: 6
- Other: 13

Best results in major championships
- Masters Tournament: DNP
- PGA Championship: DNP
- U.S. Open: DNP
- The Open Championship: T39: 1983

Kikuo Arai (新井規矩雄, Arai Kikuo; born 11 December 1943) is a Japanese professional golfer.

== Professional career ==
Arai played on the Japan Golf Tour, winning six times.

Arai also played on the PGA Tour in the 1980s. He played 45 events from 1983 to 1989, including 16 events in 1986. His best finish was a tie for second at the 1985 Bing Crosby National Pro-Am. He played on the Champions Tour in 2000, with one top-10 finish at The Instinet Classic.

== Professional wins (19) ==
=== PGA of Japan Tour wins (6) ===
No.	Date	Tournament	Winning score	Margin of victory	Runner(s)-up
1	9 Aug 1981	Mizuno Tournament	−12 (69-65-71-69=274)	2 strokes	(Japan) Shigeru Uchida
2	23 May 1982	Pepsi Ube Open	−11 (67-68-70-72=277)	2 strokes	(Japan) Motomasa Aoki
3	8 Aug 1982	Descente Cup Hokkoku Open	−12 (71-67-71-67=276)	2 strokes	(Japan) Tsuneyuki Nakajima
4	3 Apr 1983	Kuzuha Kokusai Tournament	−2 (69-69=138)	Playoff	(United States) David Ishii, (Japan) Teruo Sugihara
5	9 Jul 1983	Toyamaken Open	−7 (65-70=135)	1 stroke	(Japan) Motomasa Aoki
6	24 Jun 1984	Mizuno Tournament (2)	−9 (70-69-69-71=279)	1 stroke	(Japan) Naomichi Ozaki

PGA of Japan Tour playoff record (1–4)

No.	Year	Tournament	Opponent(s)	Result
1	1982	Bridgestone Tournament	(Taiwan) Hsieh Min-Nan	Lost to birdie on second extra hole
2	1983	Kuzuha Kokusai Tournament	(United States) David Ishii, (Japan) Teruo Sugihara	Won with par on fourth extra hole Sugihara eliminated by par on second hole
3	1983	Chunichi Crowns	(Taiwan) Chen Tze-ming, (United States) David Ishii	Chen won with par on second extra hole
4	1983	Kanto Open	(Japan) Saburo Fujiki, (Japan) Masashi Ozaki	Fujiki won with par on third extra hole Arai eliminated by par on first hole
5	1986	Daikyo Open	(Japan) Tateo Ozaki	Lost to par on third extra hole

=== Other wins (12) ===
- 1972 Tokai Classic
- 1976 Nagano Open
- 1978 Asahi Toy Ohashi Kyosen Invitational, Gunma Open
- 1980 Hakuryuko Open, Gunma Open
- 1982 Saitama Open
- 1984 Meikyukai Golden Star Charity Tournament, Gunma Open
- 1985 Meikyukai Golden Star Charity Tournament
- 1986 Asahi Breweries Ohashi Kyosen Tournament
- 1993 Sekisui Harmonate Meikyukai Charity Tournament

=== Senior wins (1) ===
- 1993 Maruman Senior Tournament

== Results in major championships ==
Tournament	1983	1984	1985
The Open Championship	T39	CUT	CUT

Note: Arai only played in the Open Championship.
CUT = missed the half-way cut (3rd round cut in 1985 Open Championship)
"T" = tied

== Results in The Players Championship ==
Tournament	1986
The Players Championship	CUT

CUT = missed the half-way cut

== Team appearances ==
- World Cup (representing Japan): 1983
- Dunhill Cup (representing Japan): 1985
- Nissan Cup (representing Japan): 1985
