= Chen Tze-chung =

Taiwanese professional golfer

Personal information
- Nationality: Taiwan
- Born: 24 June 1958 (age 68)
- Height: 1.77 m (5 ft 10 in)
- Weight: 72 kg (159 lb; 11.3 st)

Career
- Sport: Golf
- Turned professional: 1980
- Former tours: Japan Golf Tour; Asian Tour; PGA Tour
- Professional wins: 16

Number of wins by tour
- PGA Tour: 1
- Japan Golf Tour: 6
- Other: 9

Best results in major championships
- Masters Tournament: T12: 1987
- PGA Championship: T23: 1985
- U.S. Open: T2: 1985
- The Open Championship: CUT: 1987

Chen Tze-chung (Chinese: 陳志忠; born 24 June 1958) is a Taiwanese professional golfer who played on the PGA Tour, the Japan Golf Tour, the Asian Golf Circuit, the Asian Tour and the European Tour. In the U.S., he is often referred to as T.C. Chen. His older brother, Chen Tze-ming, is also a professional golfer, who has won tournaments on the Japanese and Asian tours.

In 1982, Chen became the first professional golfer from Taiwan to earn a PGA Tour card and is the first Taiwanese golfer to win on the PGA Tour with a win at the 1987 Los Angeles Open. Pan Cheng-tsung, became the second Taiwanese golfer to win on the PGA Tour with a victory in the 2019 RBC Heritage tournament. Chen was the second golfer from Asia to win on the PGA tour following Isao Aoki of Japan, who won the 1983 Hawaiian Open.

== Early life ==
Chen was born in Linkou District, Taipei City, in northern Taiwan. He dropped out of school at 14 and went to work at a Bridgestone motorcycle factory. He quit the job after a year and took up golf, following in his older brother's footsteps. His grandfather farmed the land that would become the Linkou International Golf Club and his father worked as a greenskeeper at the club. Chen admired Taiwanese golfer Lu Liang-Huan as a youth, stating "when I was a little kid, after school I came to the golf course every day and watched. I didn't know anything about golf, only read about superstars like Nicklaus and Trevino, those who were in the papers every day. Mr. Lu had finished second at the British Open, so at the time he was very famous. I was thinking someday I will be just like him. That was part of the reason I started to play golf."

== Representing Taiwan ==
Representing his country as an amateur, Chen was a member of the 1976 Eisenhower Trophy team with his brother, and then won a bronze medal for Taiwan at the 1980 tournament, as Chen finished 2nd individually, behind Hal Sutton of the United States. Chen finished 5th personally in the 1984 World Cup as a professional, leading Taiwan to a 2nd-place finish behind Spain, and represented Taiwan in 1985 and 1994 at the Alfred Dunhill Cup tournament, a country-based team golf competition, playing alongside his brother.

== Professional career ==
Chen earned his PGA Tour card on his first attempt in 1982, finishing in a tie for 4th in the Q school, joined the tour in 1983, and played a total of 132 tournaments on the PGA Tour, making the cut in 78, with 13 top-ten finishes, 1 tour win, and over $633,000 in total earnings.

At the 1985 U.S. Open, he scored the first double eagle in U.S. Open history and tied the record low scores for the championship at that time after 36 holes (134) and 54 holes (203). Leading with a two-stroke advantage heading into Sunday play, his fourth round included a quadruple-bogey eight that featured a chip shot that he hit twice in one swing, and became part of the history of disastrous shots in the final round of a major. Chen remained in contention for the title until the 18th, narrowly missing chipping in a bunker shot on the final hole, which would've forced a playoff with the eventual champion Andy North. As a result of the double-hit, it is sometimes referred to as a "TC Chen" and Chen is sometimes referred to as "Two Chips" Chen. In 2018, the USGA and The R&A, golf's governing bodies, announced a rule change for the double-hit, with the player counting it as one stroke and eliminating the penalty. Golf Digest said, "somewhere, TC Chen is smiling."

Chen finished second twice in his PGA career, at the 1983 Kemper Open, where he lost a five-man playoff to Fred Couples, and the above-mentioned 1985 U.S. Open. He played on the PGA Tour for 10 years, having his best year in 1987, when he finished 51st in earnings, 12th at the Masters, and won the 1987 Los Angeles Open with 275 (−9), defeating Ben Crenshaw in a playoff, for his only PGA Tour win. Chen sunk a 14-foot putt on the 18th hole to force the playoff, and then putted for par to beat Crenshaw on the first playoff hole.

He returned primarily to play in Asia in 1990, playing extensively on the Japan Golf Tour, where he won six tournaments, and also appeared occasionally on the European Tour. He last played on the PGA Tour in 1997, returning to the U.S. to play in the Los Angeles Open as a former champion.

As a senior, Chen played the 2008 Senior British Open on the Champions Tour and returned to the United States for the 2012 U.S. Senior Open where he made the cut and finished 56th. In Asia, he won the 2015 Iwasaki Shiratsuyu Senior Tournament on the Japan PGA Senior Tour and continues to play on the Taiwan Senior Tour, winning twice in 2020 (Southern Taiwan Senior Open Tournament, Oriental Sunshine TSPGA Open Tournament), and in 2024 won the championship in the LemTech Senior Open.

== Personal life ==
Chen and his brother Tze-ming have run and coached in the junior program at the Linkou Golf Club in Taipei City. He has three children (Jason, Jennifer, Jeffrey) and now lives in Walnut, California with his wife Sherry.

== Professional wins (16) ==
=== PGA Tour wins (1) ===
No.	Date	Tournament	Winning score	Margin of victory	Runner-up
1	22 Feb 1987	Los Angeles Open	−9 (70-67-67-71=275)	Playoff	(United States) Ben Crenshaw

PGA Tour playoff record (1–1)

No.	Year	Tournament	Opponent(s)	Result
1	1983	Kemper Open	(United States) Fred Couples, (United States) Barry Jaeckel, (United States) Gil Morgan, (United States) Scott Simpson	Couples won with birdie on second extra hole Jaeckel eliminated by par on first hole
2	1987	Los Angeles Open	(United States) Ben Crenshaw	Won with par on first extra hole

=== PGA of Japan Tour wins (6) ===
No.	Date	Tournament	Winning score	Margin of victory	Runner(s)-up
1	14 Jun 1981	Sapporo Tokyu Open	−9 (70-66-74-69=279)	3 strokes	(Australia) Terry Gale
2	28 Apr 1985	Dunlop International Open^{1}	−11 (64-73-72-68=277)	1 stroke	(Japan) Tsuneyuki Nakajima
3	26 May 1991	Ube Kosan Open	−10 (69-74-66-65=274)	2 strokes	(Japan) Saburo Fujiki
4	27 Sep 1992	Gene Sarazen Jun Classic	−11 (68-71-67-71=277)	Playoff	(Japan) Masashi Ozaki
5	30 May 1993	Mitsubishi Galant Tournament	−11 (71-72-66-68=277)	4 strokes	(Australia) Brian Jones, (Japan) Yoshi Mizumaki, (Japan) Tateo Ozaki
6	29 Aug 1993	Daiwa KBC Augusta	−11 (71-69-68-69=277)	Playoff	(Taiwan) Lin Chie-hsiang

^{1}Co-sanctioned by the Asia Golf Circuit

PGA of Japan Tour playoff record (2–3)

No.	Year	Tournament	Opponent(s)	Result
1	1981	KBC Augusta	(Taiwan) Hsieh Min-Nan, (Japan) Nobumitsu Yuhara	Hsieh won with birdie on second extra hole
2	1984	Bridgestone Tournament	(Japan) Yoshihisa Iwashita, (Japan) Masahiro Kuramoto, (Scotland) Sam Torrance	Kuramoto won with eagle on first extra hole
3	1992	Gene Sarazen Jun Classic	(Japan) Masashi Ozaki	Won with par on third extra hole
4	1993	Maruman Open	(Philippines) Frankie Miñoza	Lost to birdie on second extra hole
5	1993	Daiwa KBC Augusta	(Taiwan) Lin Chie-hsiang	Won with birdie on second extra hole

=== Asia Golf Circuit wins (2) ===
No.	Date	Tournament	Winning score	Margin of victory	Runner(s)-up
1	21 Apr 1985	Maekyung Open	−8 (70-69-69-72=280)	2 strokes	(Mexico) Rafael Alarcón, (Taiwan) Lu Chien-soon
2	28 Apr 1985	Dunlop International Open^{1}	−11 (64-73-72-68=277)	1 stroke	(Japan) Tsuneyuki Nakajima

^{1}Co-sanctioned by the PGA of Japan Tour

Asia Golf Circuit playoff record (0–2)

No.	Year	Tournament	Opponent(s)	Result
1	1981	Indonesia Open	(Taiwan) Hsu Chi-san, (Thailand) Sukree Onsham, (United States) Payne Stewart	Stewart won with birdie on first extra hole
2	1991	Philippine Open	(United States) Dennis Paulson	Lost after concession on first extra hole

=== Other wins (7) ===
- 1984 King Grapes Classic (Japan)
- 1989 Mercuries Taiwan Masters, Chang Hwa Open (Taipei), ROC PGA Championship (Taipei), Chang Kang Open (Taipei)
- 1990 Japan Chunichi Crown Open
- 1991 ROC PGA Championship (Taipei)

=== Japan PGA Senior Tour wins (1) ===
- 2015 Iwasaki Shiratsuyu Senior Tournament

== Results in major championships ==
Tournament	1983	1984	1985	1986	1987	1988	1989
Masters Tournament				T23	T12	T19	52
U.S. Open			T2	T59	CUT	CUT	
The Open Championship					CUT		
PGA Championship	72	CUT	T23		T47		

Top 10
Did not play

CUT = missed the half-way cut
"T" = tied

=== Summary ===
Tournament	Wins	2nd	3rd	Top-5	Top-10	Top-25	Events	Cuts made
Masters Tournament	0	0	0	0	0	3	4	4
U.S. Open	0	1	0	1	1	1	4	2
The Open Championship	0	0	0	0	0	0	1	0
PGA Championship	0	0	0	0	0	1	4	3
Totals	0	1	0	1	1	5	13	9

- Most consecutive cuts made – 5 (1985 U.S. Open – 1987 Masters)
- Longest streak of top-10s – 1

== Team appearances ==
Amateur

- Eisenhower Trophy (representing Taiwan): 1976, 1980

Professional

- Dunhill Cup (representing Taiwan): 1985, 1994
- World Cup (representing Taiwan): 1984

== See also ==
- 1982 PGA Tour Qualifying School graduates
