= Daiichi Fudosan Cup =

Tournament information
- Location: Sadowara, Miyazaki, Japan
- Established: 1988
- Course: Hibiscus Golf Club
- Par: 72
- Length: 6,902 yards (6,311 m)
- Tour: Japan Golf Tour
- Format: Stroke play
- Prize fund: ¥100,000,000
- Month played: March
- Final year: 1992

Tournament record score
- Aggregate: 271 Saburo Fujiki (1991)
- To par: −17 as above

Current champion
- (Taiwan) Chen Tze-ming

Final champion
- Location in Japan Location in the Miyazaki Prefecture

The Daiichi Fudosan Cup was a professional golf tournament that was held in Japan from 1988 to 1992. It was an event on the Japan Golf Tour from 1990 and was the first official event of the season with prize money of ¥90,000,000. It was replaced on the tour schedule in 1993 by the Token Homemate Cup.

== Tournament hosts ==
Years	Venue	Location
1991–1992	Hibiscus Golf Club	Sadowara, Miyazaki
1988–1990	Miyazaki Kokusai Golf Club	Sadowara, Miyazaki

== Winners ==
Year	Winner	Score	To par	Margin of victory	Runner(s)-up	Ref.
Daiichi Cup
1992	(Taiwan) Chen Tze-ming	277	−11	1 stroke	(Australia) Roger Mackay	
Daiichi Fudosan Cup
1991	(Japan) Saburo Fujiki	271	−17	1 stroke	(Australia) Brian Jones	
1990	(Australia) Brian Jones	275	−13	2 strokes	(Japan) Hideki Kase	
1989	(Japan) Naomichi Ozaki	278	−10			
1988	(Japan) Kazuya Nakajima	276	−8	1 stroke	(Taiwan) Hsieh Min-Nan (Japan) Naomichi Ozaki (Japan) Masahiro Shiota	
