= Yasuo Sone =

Japanese professional golfer (born 1950)

Personal information
- Nationality: Japan
- Born: 9 March 1950 (age 76) Ehime Prefecture, Japan
- Height: 1.61 m (5 ft 3 in)
- Weight: 65 kg (143 lb; 10.2 st)

Career
- Sport: Golf
- Status: Professional
- Former tour: Japan Golf Tour
- Professional wins: 1

Number of wins by tour
- Japan Golf Tour: 1

Yasuo Sone (born 9 March 1950) is a Japanese professional golfer.

== Career ==
Sone played on the Japan Golf Tour, winning once.

== Professional wins (1) ==
=== PGA of Japan Tour wins (1) ===
No.	Date	Tournament	Winning score	Margin of victory	Runner-up
1	4 Sep 1988	Kansai Open	−2 (76-70-70-70=286)	3 strokes	(Japan) Shinsaku Maeda
