= Bridgestone Open =

Tournament information
- Location: Chiba, Chiba
- Established: 1972
- Courses: Sodegaura Country Club (Sodegaura Course)
- Par: 71
- Length: 7,119 yards (6,510 m)
- Tour: Japan Golf Tour
- Format: Stroke play
- Prize fund: ¥110,000,000
- Month played: October
- Final year: 2021

Tournament record score
- Aggregate: 265 Yuta Ikeda (2010); 265 Tomoyasu Sugiyama (2021)
- To par: −23 Yuta Ikeda (2010)

Current champion
- (Japan) Tomoyasu Sugiyama

Final champion
- Location in Japan Location in the Chiba Prefecture

The Bridgestone Open (ブリヂストンオープンゴルフトーナメント, Burijisuton ōpun gorufu tōnamento) was a professional golf tournament in Japan, sponsored by Bridgestone. Founded in 1972, it had been an event on the Japan Golf Tour since in inaugural season in 1973. From 1972 to 1984, the title of the event was the Bridgestone Tournament, because it was only for professional players.

The tournament record is 265 (−23), set by Yuta Ikeda in 2010. The 2018 total purse was ¥150,000,000 with ¥30,000,000 going to the winner. For many years, the winner received an invite to the WGC-Bridgestone Invitational.

== Tournament hosts ==
In 1972 the first Bridgestone Tournament was held at the Mitsukaido Golf Club. The following year, the tournament moved to the Tokyo Yomiuri Country Club. Since 1974, it has been held at the Sodegaura Country Club.

== Winners ==
Year	Winner	Score	To Par	Margin of victory	Runner(s)-up	Ref.
Bridgestone Open
2021	(Japan) Tomoyasu Sugiyama	265	−19	3 strokes	(Japan) Naoyuki Kataoka (Japan) Jinichiro Kozuma	
2020	Cancelled due to the COVID-19 pandemic					
2019	(Japan) Shugo Imahira (2)	131 (Note: Shortened to 36 holes due to weather.)	−11	1 stroke	(United States) Seungsu Han (Japan) Hiroyuki Fujita (Japan) Tomoharu Otsuki (Japan) Akio Sadakata	
2018	(Japan) Shugo Imahira	268	−16	1 stroke	(Japan) Masahiro Kawamura	
2017	(Japan) Ryuko Tokimatsu	133	−9	2 strokes	(South Korea) Lee Sang-hee	
2016	(Japan) Satoshi Kodaira	270	−14	1 stroke	(South Korea) Lee Kyoung-hoon	
2015	(Japan) Michio Matsumura	275	−9	2 strokes	(Australia) Adam Bland (Japan) Mikumu Horikawa (Japan) Yuki Inamori (South Korea) Kim Kyung-tae	
2014	(Japan) Koumei Oda	269	−15	1 stroke	(Japan) Hiroyuki Fujita	
2013	(Japan) Daisuke Maruyama	203 (Note: Shortened to 54 holes due to weather.)	−10	3 strokes	(South Korea) Jang Ik-jae	
2012	(Japan) Toru Taniguchi (3)	272	−12	1 stroke	(Japan) Hiroyuki Fujita	
2011	(Japan) Toru Taniguchi (2)	269	−15	5 strokes	(Japan) Shingo Katayama (Japan) Hiroo Kawai (Japan) Michio Matsumura (Japan) Koumei Oda	
2010	(Japan) Yuta Ikeda (2)	265	−23	3 strokes	(Japan) Michio Matsumura	
2009	(Japan) Yuta Ikeda	270	−18	2 strokes	(Japan) Kenichi Kuboya	
2008	(Japan) Azuma Yano	267	−21	4 strokes	(Japan) Takao Nogami	
2007	(Japan) Shingo Katayama	270	−18	1 stroke	(Australia) Steven Conran (Japan) Keiichiro Fukabori (Japan) Tomohiro Kondo	
2006	(Japan) Taichi Teshima	266	−22	5 strokes	(Japan) Kiyoshi Maita	
2005	(New Zealand) David Smail	272	−16	2 strokes	(Japan) Toru Suzuki	
2004	(Japan) Toru Taniguchi	272	−16	1 stroke	(Japan) Shigeki Maruyama (Japan) Shinichi Yokota	
2003	(Japan) Naomichi Ozaki	267	−21	Playoff	(Australia) Paul Sheehan	
2002	(Australia) Scott Laycock	272	−16	1 stroke	(Japan) Shingo Katayama (Japan) Toru Taniguchi	
2001	(Japan) Toshimitsu Izawa	274	−14	1 stroke	(Japan) Masashi Ozaki	
2000	(Japan) Nobuhito Sato (2)	272	−16	1 stroke	(Japan) Katsumasa Miyamoto	
1999	(Japan) Shigeki Maruyama (3)	268	−20	5 strokes	(Japan) Toshimitsu Izawa	
1998	(Japan) Nobuhito Sato	275	−13	Playoff	(Japan) Tateo Ozaki	
1997	(Japan) Masashi Ozaki (2)	273	−15	1 stroke	(Japan) Shigeki Maruyama (Japan) Tateo Ozaki	
1996	(Japan) Shigeki Maruyama (2)	272	−16	2 strokes	(United States) Brian Watts	
1995	(Japan) Shigeki Maruyama	274	−14	3 strokes	(United States) Mark Calcavecchia (Japan) Masashi Ozaki (Japan) Shinichi Yokota	
1994	(United States) Brian Watts	274	−14	3 strokes	(United States) Mark Calcavecchia	
1993	(Japan) Ikuo Shirahama	271	−17	5 strokes	(United States) Mark Calcavecchia (United States) Nolan Henke (Japan) Tsukasa Watanabe	
1992	(Japan) Masahiro Kuramoto (3)	271	−17	Playoff	(Japan) Tetsu Nishikawa	
1991	(Japan) Isao Aoki	134	−10	1 stroke	(Japan) Tsuyoshi Yoneyama	
1990	(Japan) Saburo Fujiki	274	−14	Playoff	(Japan) Akihito Yokoyama	
1989	(Australia) Roger Mackay	277	−11	1 stroke	(Japan) Yoshitaka Yamamoto	
1988	(Japan) Masashi Ozaki	273	−15	2 strokes	(Japan) Isao Aoki	
1987	(United States) David Ishii	282	−6	Playoff	(Japan) Hiroshi Makino (Japan) Nobuo Serizawa	
1986	(Japan) Tateo Ozaki	276	−12	2 strokes	(Japan) Naomichi Ozaki	
1985	(Japan) Masahiro Kuramoto (2)	273	−15	1 stroke	(Japan) Isao Aoki	
Bridgestone Tournament
1984	(Japan) Masahiro Kuramoto	279	−9	Playoff	(Taiwan) Chen Tze-chung (Japan) Yoshihisa Iwashita (Scotland) Sam Torrance	
1983	(Japan) Eitaro Deguchi	274	−14	1 stroke	(Taiwan) Hsieh Min-Nan	
1982	(Taiwan) Hsieh Min-Nan (2)	279	−9	Playoff	(Japan) Kikuo Arai	
1981	(United States) Hale Irwin	275	−13	8 strokes	(United States) Bill Rogers	
1980	(United States) Bob Gilder	283	−5	1 stroke	(Japan) Isao Aoki	
1979	(United States) Lanny Wadkins	277	−11	1 stroke	(Japan) Yoshikazu Yokoshima	
1978	(Japan) Hiroshi Ishii (2)	280	−8	2 strokes	(Japan) Fujio Kobayashi	
1977	(Japan) Fujio Kobayashi	278	−10	3 strokes	(Japan) Haruo Yasuda	
1976	(Japan) Takashi Murakami	282	−6	Playoff	(Taiwan) Hsieh Min-Nan (Japan) Masaji Kusakabe	
1975	(Japan) Yoshitaka Yamamoto	283	−5	3 strokes	(Japan) Haruo Yasuda	
1974	(Australia) Graham Marsh	278	−10	1 stroke	(Japan) Seiichi Numazawa	
1973	(Japan) Hiroshi Ishii	275	−13	2 strokes	(Japan) Haruo Yasuda	
1972	(Taiwan) Hsieh Min-Nan	276	−12	3 strokes	(United States) Buddy Allin (Taiwan) Kuo Chie-Hsiung	

== See also ==
- Bridgestone Aso Open
