= 1988 PGA of Japan Tour =

Golf tour season

1988 PGA of Japan Tour season
- Duration: 17 March 1988 – 11 December 1988
- Number of official events: 40
- Most wins: (Japan) Masashi Ozaki (6)
- Money list: (Japan) Masashi Ozaki

The 1988 PGA of Japan Tour was the 16th season of the PGA of Japan Tour, the main professional golf tour in Japan since it was formed in 1973.

== Schedule ==
The following table lists official events during the 1988 season.

| Date | Tournament | Location | Purse (¥) | Winner (Note: The number in brackets after each winner's name is the number of PGA of Japan Tour events they had won up to and including that tournament. This information is only shown for PGA of Japan Tour members.) | OWGR points | Other tours (Note: AGC − Asia Golf Circuit.) | Notes |
|---|---|---|---|---|---|---|---|
| 20 Mar | Shizuoka Open | Shizuoka | 40,000,000 | (Japan) Toshimitsu Kai (2) | 8 | | |
| 10 Apr | Pocari Sweat Open | Hiroshima | 40,000,000 | (Australia) Ian Baker-Finch (2) | 8 | | |
| 17 Apr | Bridgestone Aso Open | Kumamoto | 40,000,000 | (Australia) Ian Baker-Finch (3) | 12 | | |
| 24 Apr | Dunlop Open | Ibaraki | 60,000,000 | (Japan) Masashi Ozaki (35) | 20 | AGC | |
| 1 May | The Crowns | Aichi | 90,000,000 | (United States) Scott Simpson (n/a) | 38 | | |
| 8 May | Fujisankei Classic | Shizuoka | 60,000,000 | (Japan) Ikuo Shirahama (1) | 20 | | |
| 15 May | Japan PGA Match-Play Championship Unisys Cup | Fukushima | 50,000,000 | (United States) David Ishii (10) | 20 | | |
| 22 May | Pepsi Ube Open | Yamaguchi | 50,000,000 | (Japan) Mamoru Kondo (1) | 14 | | |
| 29 May | Mitsubishi Galant Tournament | Hokkaidō | 56,000,000 | (Australia) Brian Jones (6) | 20 | | |
| 5 Jun | Sendai Classic | Miyagi | 45,000,000 | (Japan) Masahiro Kuramoto (18) | 14 | | |
| 12 Jun | Sapporo Tokyu Open | Hokkaidō | 50,000,000 | (Japan) Naomichi Ozaki (7) | 18 | | |
| 19 Jun | Yomiuri Open | Hyōgo | 70,000,000 | (Japan) Masahiro Kuramoto (19) | 16 | | |
| 26 Jun | Mizuno Open | Ishikawa | 60,000,000 | (Japan) Yoshimi Niizeki (1) | 20 | | |
| 3 Jul | Kansai Pro Championship | Hyōgo | 30,000,000 | (Japan) Masahiro Kuramoto (20) | 4 | | |
| 3 Jul | Kanto Pro Championship | Chiba | 40,000,000 | (Japan) Tomohiro Maruyama (1) | 8 | | |
| 10 Jul | Yonex Open Hiroshima | Hiroshima | 40,000,000 | (Japan) Hajime Matsui (1) | 8 | | |
| 24 Jul | Japan PGA Championship | Ehime | 65,000,000 | (Japan) Tateo Ozaki (10) | 36 | | |
| 31 Jul | NST Niigata Open | Niigata | 40,000,000 | (Japan) Naomichi Ozaki (8) | 10 | | |
| 14 Aug | Nikkei Cup | Okayama | 50,000,000 | (Japan) Masashi Ozaki (36) | 8 | | |
| 21 Aug | Maruman Open | Saitama | 70,000,000 | (Japan) Masashi Ozaki (37) | 8 | | |
| 28 Aug | KBC Augusta | Fukuoka | 50,000,000 | (Japan) Masahiro Kuramoto (21) | 16 | | |
| 4 Sep | Kyusyu Open | Oita | 15,000,000 | (Japan) Katsuyoshi Tomori (2) | 4 | | |
| 4 Sep | Chubu Open | Aichi | 15,000,000 | (Japan) Teruo Nakamura (2) | 4 | | |
| 4 Sep | Kansai Open | Hyōgo | 20,000,000 | (Japan) Yasuo Sone (1) | 4 | | |
| 4 Sep | Kanto Open | Ibaraki | 30,000,000 | (Japan) Akihito Yokoyama (1) | 6 | | |
| 4 Sep | Chushikoku Open | Hiroshima | 15,000,000 | (Japan) Masahiro Kuramoto (22) | 4 | | |
| 4 Sep | Hokkaido Open | Hokkaidō | 10,000,000 | (Japan) Mamoru Takahashi (1) | 4 | | |
| 11 Sep | Suntory Open | Chiba | 80,000,000 | (Japan) Tateo Ozaki (11) | 24 | | |
| 18 Sep | ANA Open | Hokkaidō | 70,000,000 | (Japan) Naomichi Ozaki (9) | 20 | | |
| 25 Sep | Gene Sarazen Jun Classic | Tochigi | 65,000,000 | (Japan) Tōru Nakamura (17) | 24 | | |
| 2 Oct | Tokai Classic | Aichi | 60,000,000 | (Australia) Brian Jones (7) | 24 | | |
| 9 Oct | Japan Open Golf Championship | Saitama | 60,000,000 | (Japan) Masashi Ozaki (38) | 36 | | |
| 16 Oct | Polaroid Cup Golf Digest Tournament | Shizuoka | 60,000,000 | (Japan) Masashi Ozaki (39) | 20 | | |
| 23 Oct | Bridgestone Open | Chiba | 80,000,000 | (Japan) Masashi Ozaki (40) | 38 | | |
| 30 Oct | ABC Lark Cup | Hyōgo | 150,000,000 | (Japan) Katsunari Takahashi (8) | 20 | | |
| 13 Nov | Visa Taiheiyo Club Masters | Shizuoka | 100,000,000 | (Spain) Seve Ballesteros (n/a) | 38 | | |
| 20 Nov | Dunlop Phoenix Tournament | Miyazaki | 150,000,000 | (United States) Ken Green (n/a) | 44 | | |
| 27 Nov | Casio World Open | Kagoshima | 90,000,000 | (United States) Larry Mize (n/a) | 40 | | |
| 4 Dec | Golf Nippon Series Hitachi Cup | Tokyo | 50,000,000 | (Japan) Naomichi Ozaki (10) | 16 | | |
| 11 Dec | Daikyo Open | Okinawa | 70,000,000 | (Japan) Saburo Fujiki (8) | 18 | | |

== Money list ==
The money list was based on prize money won during the season, calculated in Japanese yen.

| Position | Player | Prize money (¥) |
|---|---|---|
| 1 | (Japan) Masashi Ozaki | 125,162,540 |
| 2 | (Japan) Naomichi Ozaki | 83,782,697 |
| 3 | (United States) David Ishii | 71,372,048 |
| 4 | (Japan) Masahiro Kuramoto | 63,329,816 |
| 5 | (Australia) Brian Jones | 57,196,366 |

== Japan Challenge Tour ==
1988 Japan Challenge Tour season
- Duration: 1 June 1988 – 29 September 1988
- Number of official events: 3

The 1988 Japan Challenge Tour was the fourth season of the Japan Challenge Tour, the official development tour to the PGA of Japan Tour.

=== Schedule ===
The following table lists official events during the 1988 season.

| Date | Tournament | Location | Purse (¥) | Winner (Note: The number in brackets after each winner's name is the number of Japan Challenge Tour events they had won up to and including that tournament. It is rare for someone to accumulate many wins on the Japan Challenge Tour as success at this level usually leads to promotion to the PGA of Japan Tour.) |
|---|---|---|---|---|
| 2 Jun | Mito Green Open | Ibaraki | 14,000,000 | (Japan) Motomasa Aoki (1) |
| 23 Jun | Kanto Kokusai Open | Tochigi | 15,000,000 | (Japan) Yoshinori Kaneko (1) |
| 29 Sep | Sports Shinko Open | Osaka | 13,000,000 | (Japan) Isao Isozaki (1) |
