= Narashino Country Club =

Country club in Inzai, Chiba, Japan

Narashino Country Club is a country club in Japan. The club is located in Inzai, Chiba Prefecture, Japan.

Like many Japanese golf courses, it has two greens at every hole. The course currently measures 7,224 yards and is a par 72.

It has hosted several notable golf tournaments over the course of its history. It hosted the 1968 Japan PGA Championship, 1972 Japan Airlines Open, 1977 Japan Open Golf Championship. It also hosted the Suntory Open throughout the event's history. Notable golfers like Gary Player, Graham Marsh, and Seve Ballesteros won events at the club.

On 20 November 2018, it was announced that the course would host the Zozo Championship. It would be the first PGA Tour event in Japan. Tiger Woods won the event.

== Tournaments hosted ==
- Zozo Championship (2019), PGA Tour event and Japan Golf Tour event
- Japan Open Golf Championship (1977), Japan Golf Tour event
- Suntory Open (1974–1997), Japan Golf Tour event
- Japan Airlines Open (1972)
- Japan PGA Championship (1968)
