= Mecarobot Golf =

1992 video game

- North American box art
- Developer(s): Advance Communication Company
- Publisher(s): Toho
- Composer(s): Michiharu Hasuya; Osamu Kasai; Takashi Tsurutani
- Platform(s): Super NES
- Release: JP: December 4, 1992; NA: September 1993
- Genre(s): Arcade-style golf
- Mode(s): Single-player

Mecarobot Golf is an arcade-style golf video game released for the Super Nintendo Entertainment System. The game was originally released in Japan as Serizawa Nobuo no Birdie Try (芹沢信雄のバーディトライ, "Nobuo Serizawa's Birdy Try").

The general theme of Mecarobot Golf is a near-futuristic golf course where humanoid robots are considered to be second-class citizens. A robot named Eagle is banned from participating in the world's professional golfing tournaments due to discrimination. Eagle has the ability to play golf better than a human being, but is denied the chance to play with human individuals. A benefactor purchases Eagle and builds a golf course for him to practice on. The player's skill determine whether humans or robots are truly better at golf. Various modes (lesson, driving range, competition) help the player practice his abilities that he will need in future matches.

Japanese professional golfer Nobuo Serizawa endorsed the Japanese version of the game. However, the Western version of the game replaced his likeness with Eagle the robot. There are two possible background sounds that can be played while golfing; a simple tune for relaxation or a complex melody for "excitement."

== Gameplay ==
Upon starting a game, the player must either "sign up" (create a new profile) or use an existing profile of the Hyper Golf Club (referred to in the Japanese version as the "Lake Side Golf Club"). It is possible to save a game while in the middle of a golfing session. Through practice and the driving range, duffers can improve their maximum yardage, their handicap, and eventually get promoted from duffer status. "Semi-pro" and "pro" levels are considered to be the two highest levels a video game golfer can receive in this video game.

Japanese cover art featuring Nobuo Serizawa.

Emergency lessons offer advice when a player is about to perform a mistake in the practice (learning) mode of the game. After the 13th hole, the players must use a small boat to get to the 14th hole regardless of what mode the player is using. Like most Super NES golfing games, the clubs are selected automatically for the player, and the player must aim the ball and strike it with accuracy and balance. Players get to choose between four sets of golf clubs. As the player plays in various months of the year, the golf course changes according to the season.

The Japanese version features an all-male group of Japanese golfers, while the Western version has caucasian "family members."
