= Chen Tze-ming =

Taiwanese professional golfer

Personal information
- Nationality: Taiwan
- Born: 28 September 1952 (age 74) Taipei, Taiwan
- Height: 1.74 m (5 ft 9 in)
- Weight: 73 kg (161 lb; 11.5 st)

Career
- Sport: Golf
- Turned professional: 1978
- Former tours: Japan Golf Tour; Asia Golf Circuit
- Professional wins: 21
- Highest ranking: 78 (11 October 1987)

Number of wins by tour
- Japan Golf Tour: 9
- Other: 10 (regular); 2 (senior)

Best results in major championships
- Masters Tournament: CUT: 1986
- PGA Championship: T3: 1985
- U.S. Open: CUT: 1986
- The Open Championship: CUT: 1985, 1987, 1993

Achievements and awards
- Asia Golf Circuit Order of Merit winner: 1985

Chen Tze-ming (Chinese: 陳志明, born 28 September 1952) is a Taiwanese professional golfer who has played on the PGA Tour, Japan Golf Tour, Asia Golf Circuit, Asian Tour and the European Tour. In the U.S., he is often referred to as T.M. Chen. His younger brother, Chen Tze-chung, is also a professional golfer who has won tournaments on the Japanese, Asian and American tours.

For his country, Chen represented Taiwan at the 1974 Eisenhower Trophy, a world amateur team tournament, and then again in 1976, playing with his brother as Tze-ming posted the lowest individual score at +1. Chen also represented Taiwan as a professional in the 1979 World Cup, and in 1985 and 1994 at the Alfred Dunhill Cup tournament, a country-based team golf competition, again playing alongside his brother.

== Early life ==
Chen was born in Linkou District, Taipei City, in northern Taiwan. His grandfather farmed the land that would become the Linkou International Golf Club and his father worked as a greenskeeper at the club. Picking up golf at a young age, his younger brother Tze-chung then followed Tze-ming and picked up the game in his teens, with the brothers often playing together on tour and together in team competitions for Taiwan over their careers.

== Professional career ==
Chen gained early notice at the 1978 Malaysian Dunlop Masters, winning by a record 15 strokes, but due to his amateur status, runner-up Simon Owen took home the prize money. Chen turned professional later that same year. As a professional, he won nine tournaments on the Japan Golf Tour, with four of those victories coming in 1992 when he finished third on the end of year money list. His best finish in a major was a tie for 3rd in the 1985 PGA Championship, with a stellar final round 65 (281 overall, 3 strokes behind winner Hubert Green). Of note, the Chen family dominated the final round as the second highest score belonged to his brother Tze-chung, who shot a 66 and finished tied for 23rd.

Tze-ming also won seven times on the Asia Golf Circuit and topped the tour's Order of Merit in 1985. As a senior, Chen won the 2002 Japan PGA Senior Championship.

== Personal life ==
Chen and his brother have run and coached in the junior program at the Linkou Golf Club in Taipei City. He now lives in Tokyo.

== Professional wins (21) ==
=== PGA of Japan Tour wins (9) ===
No.	Date	Tournament	Winning score	Margin of victory	Runner(s)-up
1	29 Aug 1982	KBC Augusta	−7 (68-71-70=209) (Note: Shortened to 54 holes due to weather.)	1 stroke	(United States) Hal Sutton
2	1 May 1983	Chunichi Crowns	E (71-67-71-71=280)	Playoff	(Japan) Kikuo Arai, (United States) David Ishii
3	20 Nov 1983	Dunlop Phoenix Tournament	−2 (74-71-71-70=286)	Playoff	(United States) Tom Watson
4	26 May 1985	Pepsi Ube Open	−20 (65-71-66-66=268)	4 strokes	(Japan) Katsunari Takahashi
5	24 May 1987	Pepsi Ube Open (2)	−10 (69-72-70-67=278)	Playoff	(Japan) Hiroshi Makino
6	8 Mar 1992	Daiichi Cup	−11 (66-71-70-70=277)	1 stroke	(Australia) Roger Mackay
7	12 Apr 1992	Pocari Sweat Open	−11 (69-67-66=202)	3 strokes	(Japan) Saburo Fujiki, (Japan) Yoshinori Kaneko, (Japan) Hirofumi Miyase, (Japan) Kiyoshi Murota, (Japan) Nobuo Serizawa, (Japan) Koichi Suzuki, (Japan) Akihito Yokoyama
8	30 Aug 1992	Daiwa KBC Augusta	−12 (72-69-68-67=276)	Playoff	(Australia) Bradley Hughes, (Japan) Norikazu Kawakami
9	6 Dec 1992	Golf Nippon Series Hitachi Cup	−8 (72-70-66-72=280)	1 stroke	(United States) Todd Hamilton

PGA of Japan Tour playoff record (4–0)

No.	Year	Tournament	Opponent(s)	Result
1	1983	Chunichi Crowns	(Japan) Kikuo Arai, (United States) David Ishii	Won with par on second extra hole
2	1983	Dunlop Phoenix Tournament	(United States) Tom Watson	Won with par on first extra hole
3	1987	Pepsi Ube Open	(Japan) Hiroshi Makino	Won with birdie on first extra hole
4	1992	Daiwa KBC Augusta	(Australia) Bradley Hughes, (Japan) Norikazu Kawakami	Won with birdie on first extra hole

=== Asia Golf Circuit wins (7) ===
No.	Date	Tournament	Winning score	Margin of victory	Runner(s)-up
1	20 Apr 1980	Korea Open	−4 (68-72-74=214)	1 stroke	(South Korea) Choi Sang-ho, (Japan) Hisao Inoue, (South Korea) Kim Suk-bong, (South Korea) Park Jung-woong, (South Korea) Yeom Se-woon
2	1 Mar 1981	Cathay Pacific Hong Kong Open	E (70-71-69-69=279)	1 stroke	(Australia) Graham Marsh
3	19 Apr 1981	Korea Open (2)	−3 (71-67-70-76=285)	1 stroke	(Taiwan) Hsu Chi-san
4	11 Apr 1982	Taiwan Open	+1 (69-72-75-73=289)	2 strokes	(Taiwan) Chien Shun-lu (a), (Taiwan) Kuo Chie-Hsiung
5	27 Mar 1983	Thailand Open	−5 (70-73-68-72=283)	1 stroke	(United States) Lou Graham, (Taiwan) Lu Chien-soon, (Philippines) Frankie Miñoza
6	31 Mar 1985	Singapore Open	−10 (67-69-68-70=274)	Playoff	(New Zealand) Greg Turner
7	15 Mar 1987	Thai International Thailand Open (2)	−12 (70-66-70-66=272)	Playoff	(Thailand) Somsak Srisanga

Asia Golf Circuit playoff record (2–0)

No.	Year	Tournament	Opponent	Result
1	1985	Singapore Open	(New Zealand) Greg Turner	Won with birdie on first extra hole
2	1987	Thai International Thailand Open	(Thailand) Somsak Srisanga	Won with birdie on third extra hole

=== Other wins (3) ===
this list may be incomplete

- 1978 Malaysian Dunlop Masters (as an amateur)
- 1985 Rolex Masters (Singapore)
- 1987 Rolex Masters (Singapore)

=== Senior wins (2) ===
this list may be incomplete

- 2002 Japan PGA Senior Championship
- 2003 Castle Hill Open

== Results in major championships ==
Tournament	1985	1986	1987	1988	1989	1990	1991	1992	1993
Masters Tournament		CUT							
U.S. Open		CUT							
The Open Championship	CUT		CUT						CUT
PGA Championship	T3	CUT							

Top 10
Did not play

CUT = missed the half-way cut (3rd round cut in 1985 Open Championship)
"T" = tied

== Team appearances ==
this list may be incomplete

Amateur

- Eisenhower Trophy (representing Taiwan): 1974, 1976 (individual leader, tie)

Professional

- Dunhill Cup (representing Taiwan): 1985, 1994
- World Cup (representing Taiwan): 1979
