= Nobumitsu Yuhara =

Japanese golfer

Nobumitsu Yuhara 湯原 信光
Personal information
- Nationality: Japan
- Born: 14 August 1957 (age 69) Tokyo, Japan
- Height: 1.73 m (5 ft 8 in)
- Weight: 78 kg (172 lb; 12.3 st)

Career
- Sport: Golf
- Turned professional: 1980
- Current tour: Japan Golf Tour
- Professional wins: 8

Number of wins by tour
- Japan Golf Tour: 7
- Other: 1

Nobumitsu Yuhara (湯原 信光, Yuhara Nobumitsu; born 14 August 1957) is a Japanese professional golfer.

== Professional career ==
Yuhara played on the Japan Golf Tour, winning seven times. He also provided commentary and motion capture for the game Masters '98: Harukanaru Augusta.

== Professional wins (8) ==
=== Japan Golf Tour wins (7) ===
No.	Date	Tournament	Winning score	Margin of victory	Runner(s)-up
1	6 Sep 1981	Kanto Open	−6 (70-72-68-72=282)	1 stroke	(Japan) Kikuo Arai
2	5 Oct 1981	Gene Sarazen Jun Classic	−4 (71-70-73-70=284)	1 stroke	(Japan) Takaaki Kono
3	8 May 1983	Fujisankei Classic	+3 (69-71-69-78=287)	1 stroke	(Japan) Masahiro Kuramoto
4	8 Apr 1990	Pocari Sweat Open	−7 (69-70-71-67=277)	2 strokes	(Australia) Wayne Smith
5	14 Jun 1992	Sapporo Tokyu Open	−7 (73-68-72-68=281)	Playoff	(Japan) Nobuo Serizawa, (Japan) Kazuhiro Takami
6	12 Jul 1992	Yonex Open Hiroshima	−9 (71-67-69-68=275)	1 stroke	(Japan) Saburo Fujiki, (Japan) Satoshi Higashi, (Japan) Kiyoshi Murota
7	1 Sep 2002	Hisamitsu-KBC Augusta	−7 (68-69-72=209) (Note: Shortened to 54 holes due to weather.)	1 stroke	(Japan) Shigemasa Higaki, (Japan) Katsunori Kuwabara, (Japan) Toshimasa Nakajima, (United States) Christian Peña, (China) Zhang Lianwei

Japan Golf Tour playoff record (1–3)

No.	Year	Tournament	Opponent(s)	Result
1	1981	KBC Augusta	(Taiwan) Chen Tze-chung, (Taiwan) Hsieh Min-Nan	Hsieh won with birdie on second extra hole
2	1985	Mitsubishi Galant Tournament	(Australia) Brian Jones	Lost to birdie on fourth extra hole
3	1985	Casio World Open	(Australia) Wayne Grady, (United States) Hubert Green, (United States) Scott Hoch	Green won with par on second extra hole Grady and Yuhara eliminated by par on first hole
4	1992	Sapporo Tokyu Open	(Japan) Nobuo Serizawa, (Japan) Kazuhiro Takami	Won with birdie on first extra hole

=== Japan Senior PGA Tour wins (1) ===
- 2010 Koujun Classic Senior Tournament

== Team appearances ==
- Nissan Cup (representing Japan): 1986 (winners)
- Dunhill Cup (representing Japan): 1987, 1992
