= Japan Airlines Open =

Japanese golf tournament

Tournament information
- Location: Japan
- Established: 1971
- Tour: Japan Golf Tour
- Format: Stroke play
- Final year: 1972

Tournament record score
- Aggregate: 277 David Graham (1971); 277 Masashi Ozaki (1971)
- To par: −11 as above

Final champion
- (South Africa) Gary Player

The Japan Airlines Open was a professional golf tournament in Japan in the early 1970s. The event was founded in 1971.

== History ==
The first event was held at the Fuchu Country Club near Tokyo, Japan. A number of notable international golfers played the event, including England's Tony Jacklin, Australia's David Graham, and Australia's Graham Marsh. David Graham was four shots back entering the final round but shot a "nearly flawless" 68 (−4) and wound up tied with Japan's Jumbo Ozaki at the end of regulation. Graham and Ozaki then competed in a 3-hole playoff; both remained tied at the end of it. They then competed in a sudden-death playoff. They were still tied after the first two holes of sudden death. On the third sudden-death playoff hole (and 6th overall) Graham made a tap-in birdie before Ozaki missed an 8-foot birdie putt.

The second event was held at Narashino Country Club in Inzai, Japan. Again there were a number of notable international golfers at the event. Among the 88 competitors were South Africa's Gary Player, Australia's Graham Marsh, and Australia's Peter Thomson. Player won the event, getting up and down from a bunker on the final hole to win by one over a number of golfers, including Thomson.

== Winners ==
Year	Winner	Score	To par	Margin of victory	Runner(s)-up	Winner's share (¥)	Venue	Ref
1972	(South Africa) Gary Player	280	−8	1 stroke	(Taiwan) Lu Liang-Huan (Japan) Tōru Nakamura (Australia) Peter Thomson (Japan) Haruo Yasuda	2,000,000	Narashino Country Club	
1971	(Australia) David Graham	277	−11	Playoff	(Japan) Masashi Ozaki	1,100,000	Fuchu Country Club	
