= 1989 PGA of Japan Tour =

Golf tour season

1989 PGA of Japan Tour season
- Duration: 16 March 1989 – 10 December 1989
- Number of official events: 41
- Most wins: (Japan) Masashi Ozaki (7)
- Money list: (Japan) Masashi Ozaki

The 1989 PGA of Japan Tour was the 17th season of the PGA of Japan Tour, the main professional golf tour in Japan since it was formed in 1973.

== Schedule ==
The following table lists official events during the 1989 season.

Date	Tournament	Location	Purse (¥)	Winner (Note: The number in brackets after each winner's name is the number of PGA of Japan Tour events they had won up to and including that tournament. This information is only shown for PGA of Japan Tour members.)	OWGR points	Other tours (Note: AGC − Asia Golf Circuit.)	Notes
19 Mar	Shizuoka Open	Shizuoka	40,000,000	(Japan) Koichi Suzuki (2)	8		
26 Mar	Setonaikai Open	Kagawa	50,000,000	(Japan) Naomichi Ozaki (11)	8		
9 Apr	Pocari Sweat Open	Hiroshima	50,000,000	(Japan) Yoshikazu Yokoshima (4)	8		
16 Apr	Bridgestone Aso Open	Kumamoto	40,000,000	(Australia) Craig Parry (n/a)	8		
23 Apr	Dunlop Open	Ibaraki	60,000,000	(Australia) Terry Gale (2)	18	AGC	
30 Apr	The Crowns	Aichi	100,000,000	(Australia) Greg Norman (n/a)	38		
7 May	Fujisankei Classic	Shizuoka	60,000,000	(Japan) Masashi Ozaki (41)	18		
14 May	Japan PGA Match-Play Championship Unisys Cup	Fukushima	50,000,000	(Japan) Masashi Ozaki (42)	16		
21 May	Pepsi Ube Kosan Open	Yamaguchi	50,000,000	(Japan) Akihito Yokoyama (2)	12		
28 May	Mitsubishi Galant Tournament	Kumamoto	70,000,000	(Japan) Tateo Ozaki (12)	16		
4 Jun	Sendai Classic	Miyagi	50,000,000	(Japan) Masashi Ozaki (43)	16		
11 Jun	Sapporo Tokyu Open	Hokkaidō	50,000,000	(Australia) Graham Marsh (19)	16		
18 Jun	Yomiuri Sapporo Beer Open	Hyōgo	70,000,000	(Japan) Hajime Meshiai (4)	12		
25 Jun	Mizuno Open	Ishikawa	65,000,000	(Japan) Akiyoshi Ohmachi (2)	16		
2 Jul	Kansai Pro Championship	Yamaguchi	30,000,000	(Japan) Hajime Matsui (2)	4		
2 Jul	Kanto Pro Championship	Tochigi	40,000,000	(Japan) Saburo Fujiki (9)	4		
9 Jul	Yonex Open Hiroshima	Hiroshima	60,000,000	(Japan) Masashi Ozaki (44)	8		
30 Jul	NST Niigata Open	Niigata	50,000,000	(Japan) Katsuyoshi Tomori (3)	8		
6 Aug	Japan PGA Championship	Niigata	70,000,000	(Japan) Masashi Ozaki (45)	32		
13 Aug	Nikkei Cup	Shizuoka	60,000,000	(Japan) Yoshimi Niizeki (2)	8		
20 Aug	Maruman Open	Saitama	80,000,000	(Japan) Koichi Suzuki (3)	8		
27 Aug	Daiwa KBC Augusta	Fukuoka	100,000,000	(Japan) Teruo Sugihara (25)	16		
3 Sep	Chubu Open	Mie	15,000,000	(Japan) Tadao Nakamura (2)	4		
3 Sep	Kyusyu Open	Kumamoto	20,000,000	(Japan) Shinji Kuraoka (1)	4		
3 Sep	Kanto Open	Saitama	30,000,000	(Japan) Yoshi Mizumaki (1)	4		
3 Sep	Chushikoku Open	Hiroshima	20,000,000	(Japan) Tadami Ueno (6)	4		
3 Sep	Kansai Open	Hyōgo	20,000,000	(Japan) Yoshitaka Yamamoto (12)	4		
3 Sep	Hokkaido Open	Hokkaidō	10,000,000	(Japan) Mamoru Takahashi (2)	4		
10 Sep	Suntory Open	Chiba	80,000,000	(United States) Larry Nelson (n/a)	18		
17 Sep	ANA Open	Hokkaidō	70,000,000	(Japan) Masashi Ozaki (46)	20		
24 Sep	Gene Sarazen Jun Classic	Tochigi	70,000,000	(Japan) Tateo Ozaki (13)	16		
1 Oct	Tokai Classic	Aichi	60,000,000	(Japan) Isao Aoki (46)	18		
8 Oct	Japan Open Golf Championship	Aichi	60,000,000	(Japan) Masashi Ozaki (47)	64		
15 Oct	Polaroid Cup Golf Digest Tournament	Shizuoka	70,000,000	(Japan) Yoshikazu Yokoshima (5)	16		
22 Oct	Bridgestone Open	Chiba	100,000,000	(Australia) Roger Mackay (1)	32		
29 Oct	ABC Lark Cup	Hyōgo	160,000,000	(Australia) Brian Jones (8)	16		
12 Nov	Visa Taiheiyo Club Masters	Shizuoka	120,000,000	(Spain) José María Olazábal (n/a)	30		
19 Nov	Dunlop Phoenix Tournament	Miyazaki	160,000,000	(United States) Larry Mize (n/a)	64		
26 Nov	Casio World Open	Kagoshima	100,000,000	(Japan) Isao Aoki (47)	36		
3 Dec	Golf Nippon Series Hitachi Cup	Tokyo	60,000,000	(Japan) Akiyoshi Ohmachi (3)	18		
10 Dec	Daikyo Open	Okinawa	80,000,000	(Japan) Nobuo Serizawa (2)	8		

== Money list ==
The money list was based on prize money won during the season, calculated in Japanese yen.

Position	Player	Prize money (¥)
1	(Japan) Masashi Ozaki	108,715,733
2	(Japan) Naomichi Ozaki	79,690,766
3	(Australia) Brian Jones	70,061,826
4	(Japan) Isao Aoki	53,125,400
5	(Australia) Graham Marsh	52,601,000

== Japan Challenge Tour ==
1989 Japan Challenge Tour season
- Duration: 25 May 1989 – 1 November 1989
- Number of official events: 6

The 1989 Japan Challenge Tour was the fifth season of the Japan Challenge Tour, the official development tour to the PGA of Japan Tour.

=== Schedule ===
The following table lists official events during the 1989 season.

Date	Tournament	Location	Purse (¥)	Winner (Note: The number in brackets after each winner's name is the number of Japan Challenge Tour events they had won up to and including that tournament. It is rare for someone to accumulate many wins on the Japan Challenge Tour as success at this level usually leads to promotion to the PGA of Japan Tour.)
26 May	Kanto Kokusai Open	Tochigi	16,000,000	(Japan) Gohei Sato (1)
1 Jun	Mito Green Open	Ibaraki	15,000,000	(Japan) Yoshiharu Ota (1)
12 Jul	Sports Shinko Open	Osaka	13,000,000	(Japan) Tetsuya Tsuda (1)
20 Sep	Inperial Growing Open	Kanagawa	13,000,000	(Japan) Sadao Sakashita (1)
27 Sep	Korakuen Cup (1st)	Tochigi	15,000,000	(Japan) Toshiaki Nakagawa (1)
1 Nov	Korakuen Cup (2nd)	Tochigi	15,000,000	(Colombia) Eduardo Herrera (1)
