= Four Tours World Championship =

The Four Tours World Championship was an annual professional golf tournament that was played from 1985 to 1991. It was played between teams representing the four main professional tours: the American PGA Tour, the European Tour, the PGA Tour of Australasia and the Japan Golf Tour. In 1985 and 1986 it was called the Nissan Cup, in 1987 and 1988 it was called the Kirin Cup while from 1989 to 1991 it was called the Asahi Glass Four Tours World Championship.

Each team played the other three teams in the group stage. The leading two teams then played a final, with the other two teams playing for third and fourth places. There were six players on each team. Each match consisted of six singles matches, decided by medal match play over 18 holes.

== Winners ==
=== Team ===
Year	Venue	Winners	Points	Runner-up	Points	Third	Fourth	Total purse ($)	Winner's share ($)
Asahi Glass Four Tours World Championship
1991	Royal Adelaide Golf Club	Europe	8	Australasia	4	Japan	United States	1,150,000	480,000
1990	Tokyo Yomiuri Country Club	Australasia	–	United States	–	Europe	Japan	1,150,000	480,000
1989	Tokyo Yomiuri Country Club	United States	6	Europe	6	Japan	Australasia	1,030,000	390,000
Kirin Cup
1988	Kapalua Resort, Bay course	United States	8	Europe	4	Australasia	Japan	1,000,000	360,000
1987	Tokyo Yomiuri Country Club	United States	10	Europe	2	Australasia	Japan	950,000	360,000
Nissan Cup
1986	Tokyo Yomiuri Country Club	Japan	8	Europe	4	Australasia	United States	900,000	300,000
1985	Kapalua Resort, Bay course	United States	10	Europe	2	Japan	Australasia	750,000	300,000

Two points were awarded for a win, one point for a halved match. In 1989 United States won the championship with an aggregate score of 404 to Europe's 416. In 1990 the final was cancelled because of rain. Both teams had scored 20 points in the three group matches which meant that the result was decided on aggregate scores. Wayne Levi did not complete his first match because of an injury and hence the United States score was uncountable and Australasia were declared the winners.

=== Individual Trophy ===
Year	Winner	Country	Score	Margin of victory	Runner-up
Nissan Cup
1985	Sandy Lyle	Scotland	−21 (267)	3 strokes	(United States) Curtis Strange
1986	Tsuneyuki Nakajima	Japan	−18 (270)	2 strokes	(West Germany) Bernhard Langer

=== Summary ===
Team	Wins	2nd	3rd	4th
United States	4	1	0	2
Europe	1	5	1	0
Australasia	1	1	3	2
Japan	1	0	3	3

== 1985 ==
Sandy Lyle won the individual event with a score of 267 (21 under par) for his four rounds, three ahead of Curtis Strange

=== Teams ===
The teams were:

- United States: Raymond Floyd (captain), Mark O'Meara, Corey Pavin, Calvin Peete, Curtis Strange, Lanny Wadkins
- Europe: Bernhard Langer (captain), Gordon Brand Jnr, Howard Clark, Sandy Lyle, Sam Torrance, Ian Woosnam
- Japan: Isao Aoki, Kikuo Arai, Shinsaku Maeda, Tsuneyuki Nakajima, Naomichi Ozaki, Tateo Ozaki
- Australasia: Ian Baker-Finch, Wayne Grady, David Graham, Brian Jones, Graham Marsh, Greg Norman

Seve Ballesteros was on the original European team but withdrew and was replaced by Ian Woosnam

== 1986 ==
Tsuneyuki Nakajima won the individual event with a score of 270 (18 under par) for his four rounds, two ahead of Bernhard Langer.

=== Teams ===
The teams were:

- United States: John Mahaffey, Calvin Peete, Dan Pohl, Payne Stewart, Hal Sutton, Bob Tway
- Europe: Bernhard Langer (captain), Gordon J. Brand, Howard Clark, Nick Faldo, Sandy Lyle, Ian Woosnam
- Japan: Tsuneyuki Nakajima, Masashi Ozaki, Naomichi Ozaki, Tateo Ozaki, Koichi Suzuki, Nobumitsu Yuhara
- Australasia: Ian Baker-Finch, Rodger Davis, David Graham, Brian Jones, Graham Marsh, Greg Norman

== 1987 ==
=== Teams ===
The teams were:

- United States: Mark Calcavecchia, Tom Kite, Dan Pohl, Scott Simpson, Payne Stewart, Curtis Strange, Lanny Wadkins
- Europe: Bernhard Langer (captain), Ken Brown, Nick Faldo, Sandy Lyle, José María Olazábal, Ian Woosnam
- Japan: Isao Aoki, Hajime Meshiai, Tsuneyuki Nakajima, Tōru Nakamura, Masashi Ozaki, Tateo Ozaki
- Australasia: Ian Baker-Finch, Rodger Davis, Brian Jones, Graham Marsh, Greg Norman, Peter Senior

== 1988 ==
=== Teams ===
The teams were:

- United States: Chip Beck, Ben Crenshaw, Steve Pate, Mike Reid, Joey Sindelar, Curtis Strange
- Europe: Gordon Brand Jnr, Anders Forsbrand, Mark James, Mark Mouland, Ronan Rafferty, José Rivero
- Japan: Isao Aoki, Hiroshi Makino, Masahiro Kuramoto, Tsuneyuki Nakajima, Yoshimi Niizeki, Nobuo Serizawa
- Australasia: Ian Baker-Finch, Rodger Davis, Brian Jones, Graham Marsh, Craig Parry, Peter Senior

== 1989 ==
=== Teams ===
The teams were:

- United States: Chip Beck, Mark Calcavecchia, Ken Green, Tom Kite, Payne Stewart, Curtis Strange
- Europe: Bernhard Langer (captain), Gordon Brand Jnr, Mark James, José María Olazábal, Ronan Rafferty, Ian Woosnam
- Japan: Tōru Nakamura, Masashi Ozaki, Naomichi Ozaki, Tateo Ozaki, Koichi Suzuki, Katsunari Takahashi
- Australasia: Ian Baker-Finch, Wayne Grady, Brian Jones, Greg Norman, Craig Parry, Peter Senior

== 1990 ==
=== Teams ===
The teams were:

- United States: Mark Calcavecchia, Fred Couples, Wayne Levi, Jodie Mudd, Tim Simpson, Payne Stewart
- Europe: Nick Faldo (captain), David Feherty, Mark James, Bernhard Langer, Ronan Rafferty, Ian Woosnam
- Japan: Saburo Fujiki, Hideki Kase, Masahiro Kuramoto, Naomichi Ozaki, Nobuo Serizawa, Noboru Sugai
- Australasia: Ian Baker-Finch, Rodger Davis, Wayne Grady, Brian Jones, Craig Parry, Peter Senior

== 1991 ==
=== Teams ===
The teams were:

- United States: Fred Couples, Jim Gallagher Jr., Billy Mayfair, Tom Purtzer, Bob Tway, Lanny Wadkins
- Europe: Sam Torrance (captain), Paul Broadhurst, David Feherty, Colin Montgomerie, Ronan Rafferty, Steven Richardson
- Japan: Yoshinori Kaneko, Hideki Kase, Ryoken Kawagishi, Hiroshi Makino, Noboru Sugai, Tsukasa Watanabe
- Australasia: Ian Baker-Finch, Rodger Davis, Mike Harwood, Roger Mackay, Graham Marsh, Craig Parry
