= Hajime Matsui =

Japanese professional golfer (born 1954)

Personal information
- Nationality: Japan
- Born: 30 March 1954 (age 72) Osaka Prefecture
- Height: 1.75 m (5 ft 9 in)
- Weight: 66 kg (146 lb; 10.4 st)

Career
- Sport: Golf
- Status: Professional
- Former tour: Japan Golf Tour
- Professional wins: 2

Number of wins by tour
- Japan Golf Tour: 2

Hajime Matsui (born 30 March 1954) is a Japanese professional golfer.

== Career ==
Matsui played on the Japan Golf Tour, winning twice.

== Professional wins (2) ==
=== PGA of Japan Tour wins (2) ===
No.	Date	Tournament	Winning score	Margin of victory	Runner-up
1	10 Jul 1988	Yonex Open Hiroshima	−14 (69-71-66-68=274)	1 stroke	(Japan) Katsuyoshi Tomori
2	2 Jul 1989	Kansai Pro Championship	−12 (70-68-70-68=276)	3 strokes	(Japan) Nobuhiro Yoshino
