= Naomichi Ozaki =

Japanese professional golfer (born 1956)

Naomichi Ozaki 尾崎直道
Personal information
- Nickname: Joe
- Nationality: Japan
- Born: 18 May 1956 (age 70) Tokushima Prefecture, Japan
- Height: 1.74 m (5 ft 9 in)
- Weight: 76 kg (168 lb; 12.0 st)

Career
- Sport: Golf
- Turned professional: 1977
- Current tour: Japan PGA Senior Tour
- Former tours: PGA Tour; Japan Golf Tour; Champions Tour
- Professional wins: 38

Number of wins by tour
- Japan Golf Tour: 32 (4th all-time)
- Other: 6

Best results in major championships
- Masters Tournament: T33: 1990
- PGA Championship: T28: 1992
- U.S. Open: T25: 1993
- The Open Championship: T38: 1998

Achievements and awards
- Japan Golf Tour money list winner: 1991, 1999

Naomichi "Joe" Ozaki (尾崎直道, Ozaki Naomichi; ジョー Jō) (born 18 May 1956) is a Japanese professional golfer.

== Career ==
In 1956, Ozaki was born in Tokushima Prefecture, Japan. He turned professional in 1977 and won 32 tournaments on the Japan Golf Tour between 1984 and 2005. He ranks fourth on the list of most Japan Golf Tour wins. He topped the money list in 1991 and 1999. He is fifth on the career money list (through 2014).

Ozaki played 185 times on the PGA Tour from 1984 to 2001, primarily from 1993 to 2001. His best finish was a T-2 at the 1997 Buick Open. His best finish in a major championship was a T-25 at the 1993 U.S. Open.

In 2005, he came in third at the Champions Tour Qualifying Tournament, and he began play on that tour after turning 50 in May 2006. His best finishes are a playoff loss at the 2007 Boeing Classic and a T-2 in the 2010 Regions Charity Classic.

Ozaki played on the International Team in the 1998 Presidents Cup.

== Personal life ==
Ozaki's older brother, Masashi "Jumbo" Ozaki, topped the Japan Golf Tour money list twelve times, and another brother, Tateo "Jet" Ozaki, is also a professional golfer who won 15 times on the Japan Golf Tour.

== Professional wins (38) ==
=== Japan Golf Tour wins (32) ===
Legend
Flagship events (2)
Japan majors (1) (Note: The 2000 Japan Open Golf Championship was also a Japan major championship.)
Other Japan Golf Tour (30)

No.	Date	Tournament	Winning score	Margin of victory	Runner(s)-up
1	18 Mar 1984	Shizuoka Open	−2 (71-70-75-70=286)	5 strokes	(Japan) Eitaro Deguchi, (Japan) Yoshitaka Yamamoto
2	10 Jun 1984	Sapporo Tokyu Open	−8 (71-69-68-72=280)	2 strokes	(Japan) Isao Aoki
3	26 Aug 1984	KBC Augusta	−13 (71-64-70-70=275)	1 stroke	(Japan) Kouichi Inoue, (Japan) Tsuneyuki Nakajima
4	18 Aug 1985	Nikkei Cup	−14 (66-68-68-68=274)	4 strokes	(Japan) Yoshihisa Iwashita
5	24 May 1986	Pepsi Ube Open	−12 (71-69-68-68=276)	1 stroke	(Japan) Fujio Kobayashi
6	5 Jul 1987	Kanto Pro Championship	−4 (68-72-72=212)*	1 stroke	(Japan) Nobumitsu Yuhara
7	12 Jun 1988	Sapporo Tokyu Open (2)	−9 (70-74-64-71=279)	3 strokes	(Japan) Tateo Ozaki
8	31 Jul 1988	NST Niigata Open	−11 (70-66-69-72=277)	3 strokes	(United States) David Ishii
9	18 Sep 1988	ANA Open	−10 (63-69-73-73=278)	Playoff	(Australia) Brian Jones
10	4 Dec 1988	Golf Nippon Series Hitachi Cup	−13 (69-70-68-68=275)	5 strokes	(Japan) Isao Aoki
11	26 Mar 1989	Setonaikai Open	−6 (68-74-69-71=282)	2 strokes	(Japan) Kinpachi Yoshimura
12	13 May 1990	Japan PGA Match-Play Championship Unisys Cup	6 and 5		(Australia) Brian Jones
13	23 Sep 1990	Gene Sarazen Jun Classic	−11 (68-66-69-70=273)	1 stroke	(Japan) Yoshinori Kaneko
14	2 Dec 1990	Golf Nippon Series Hitachi Cup (2)	−13 (71-69-64-71=275)	Playoff	(Japan) Tsuneyuki Nakajima
15	28 Jul 1991	Nikkei Cup (2)	−7 (67-66-70=203)*	Playoff	(Japan) Eiichi Itai
16	15 Sep 1991	Suntory Open	−12 (67-69-72-68=276)	2 strokes	(Taiwan) Chen Tze-chung
17	1 Dec 1991	Casio World Open	−18 (71-67-64-68=270)	2 strokes	(Japan) Hajime Meshiai
18	8 Dec 1991	Golf Nippon Series Hitachi Cup (3)	−20 (71-65-66-66=268)	8 strokes	(Japan) Tsuneyuki Nakajima, (Japan) Nobumitsu Yuhara
19	15 Mar 1992	Imperial Open	−8 (71-68-71-70=280)	3 strokes	(Japan) Seiki Okuda
20	13 Sep 1992	Suntory Open (2)	−9 (67-72-67-73=279)	2 strokes	(Australia) Wayne Grady, (Japan) Tateo Ozaki, (Japan) Yoshikazu Yokoshima, (Japan) Nobumitsu Yuhara
21	1 Nov 1992	Lark Cup	−9 (68-68-71-72=279)	1 stroke	(Japan) Masashi Ozaki
22	14 Aug 1994	Acom International	41 pts (14-2-12-13=41)	6 points	(Japan) Masayuki Kawamura
23	27 Oct 1996	Philip Morris Championship	−10 (71-70-67-70=278)	4 strokes	(United States) Russ Cochran, (United States) David Ishii, (Japan) Masashi Ozaki
24	6 Jul 1997	PGA Philanthropy Tournament	−17 (66-64-68-69=267)	9 strokes	(Japan) Eiji Mizoguchi, (Japan) Tsuyoshi Yoneyama
25	13 Jul 1997	Yonex Open Hiroshima	−12 (69-71-68-68=276)	2 strokes	(Japan) Hiroyuki Fujita
26	18 Apr 1999	Tsuruya Open	−15 (65-70-66-72=273)	2 strokes	(Japan) Toru Suzuki
27	16 May 1999	Japan PGA Championship	−5 (70-71-73-69=283)	2 strokes	(Japan) Masashi Ozaki
28	3 Oct 1999	Japan Open Golf Championship	+10 (68-76-76-78=298)	2 strokes	(Japan) Kazuhiko Hosokawa, (Japan) Nobumitsu Yuhara
29	15 Oct 2000	Japan Open Golf Championship (2)	−3 (67-72-70-72=281)	1 stroke	(Taiwan) Lin Keng-chi
30	26 Oct 2003	Bridgestone Open	−21 (66-69-67-65=267)	Playoff	(Australia) Paul Sheehan
31	24 Apr 2005	Tsuruya Open (2)	−13 (67-69-67-68=271)	3 strokes	(Japan) Ryoken Kawagishi, (Australia) Paul Sheehan
32	1 May 2005	The Crowns	−11 (68-67-67-67=269)	Playoff	(Australia) Steven Conran

*Note: Tournament shortened to 54 holes due to rain.

Japan Golf Tour playoff record (5–3)

No.	Year	Tournament	Opponent(s)	Result
1	1988	Mitsubishi Galant Tournament	(Australia) Brian Jones	Lost to birdie on first extra hole
2	1988	ANA Open	(Australia) Brian Jones	Won with par on third extra hole
3	1989	Gene Sarazen Jun Classic	(Japan) Tateo Ozaki	Lost to par on second extra hole
4	1990	Golf Nippon Series	(Japan) Tsuneyuki Nakajima	Won with birdie on third extra hole
5	1991	Nikkei Cup	(Japan) Eiichi Itai	Won with par on first extra hole
6	2002	Sun Chlorella Classic	(Australia) Brendan Jones, (United States) Christian Peña	Peña won with birdie on first extra hole
7	2003	Bridgestone Open	(Australia) Paul Sheehan	Won with birdie on second extra hole
8	2005	The Crowns	(Australia) Steven Conran	Won with par on second extra hole

=== Other wins (3) ===
- 1987 Masaaki Hirao Pro-Am
- 1989 Daiichi Fudosan Cup, Imperial Open

=== Japan PGA Senior Tour wins (3) ===
- 2012 Starts Senior Tournament, Komatsu Country Club
- 2014 Japan PGA Senior Championship

== Playoff record ==
Champions Tour playoff record (0–1)

No.	Year	Tournament	Opponents	Result
1	2007	Boeing Classic	(United States) R. W. Eaks, (United States) David Eger, (United States) Gil Morgan, (United States) Dana Quigley, (United States) Craig Stadler, (Zimbabwe) Denis Watson	Watson won with eagle on second extra hole Eger, Ozaki, Morgan and Quigley eliminated by birdie on first hole

== Results in major championships ==
Tournament	1984	1985	1986	1987	1988	1989	1990	1991	1992	1993	1994	1995	1996	1997	1998	1999	2000	2001
Masters Tournament							T33		CUT	T45							CUT	
U.S. Open										T25								
The Open Championship	T62	CUT				T46	T39		CUT	CUT				WD	T38	T45	CUT	CUT
PGA Championship						CUT	CUT		T28	T44		T31	CUT	CUT	T44	T70	CUT	CUT

Did not play

CUT = missed the half-way cut
WD = Withdrew
"T" = tied

== Results in The Players Championship ==
Tournament	1993	1994	1995	1996	1997	1998	1999	2000	2001
The Players Championship	T6	T45	T8	CUT	T65	T18	T10	T27	T26

Top 10

CUT = missed the halfway cut
"T" indicates a tie for a place

== Results in World Golf Championships ==
Tournament	1999	2000	2001
Match Play	R64	R32	R32
Championship	T40	T35	NT^{1}
Invitational	41		

^{1}Cancelled due to 9/11

Did not play

QF, R16, R32, R64 = Round in which player lost in match play
"T" = Tied
NT = No tournament

== Team appearances ==
This list may be incomplete.

- Four Tours World Championship (representing Japan): 1985, 1986 (winners), 1989, 1990
- World Cup (representing Japan): 1985
- Dunhill Cup (representing Japan): 1986, 1988, 1989, 1996
- Presidents Cup (International team): 1998 (winners)
- Royal Trophy (Asian team): 2007 (non-playing captain), 2009 (non-playing captain, winners), 2010 (non-playing captain), 2011 (non-playing captain), 2012 (winners, non-playing captain)

== See also ==
- List of golfers with most Japan Golf Tour wins
