= 1985 PGA of Japan Tour =

Golf tour season

1985 PGA of Japan Tour season
- Duration: 21 March 1985 – 15 December 1985
- Number of official events: 40
- Most wins: (Japan) Tsuneyuki Nakajima (6)
- Money list: (Japan) Tsuneyuki Nakajima

The 1985 PGA of Japan Tour was the 13th season of the PGA of Japan Tour, the main professional golf tour in Japan since it was formed in 1973.

== Schedule ==
The following table lists official events during the 1985 season.

Date	Tournament	Location	Purse (¥)	Winner (Note: The number in brackets after each winner's name is the number of PGA of Japan Tour events they had won up to and including that tournament. This information is only shown for PGA of Japan Tour members.)	Other tours (Note: AGC − Asia Golf Circuit.)	Notes
24 Mar	Shizuoka Open	Shizuoka	30,000,000	(Japan) Seiichi Kanai (7)		
14 Apr	Pocari Sweat Open	Hiroshima	40,000,000	(Japan) Motomasa Aoki (2)		
21 Apr	Bridgestone Aso Open	Kumamoto	35,000,000	(Taiwan) Hsieh Min-Nan (10)		
28 Apr	Dunlop International Open	Ibaraki	US$200,000	(Taiwan) Chen Tze-chung (2)	AGC	
5 May	Chunichi Crowns	Aichi	80,000,000	(Japan) Seiji Ebihara (1)		
12 May	Fujisankei Classic	Shizuoka	40,000,000	(United States) Mark O'Meara (n/a)		
19 May	Japan PGA Match-Play Championship	Ibaraki	32,000,000	(Japan) Katsunari Takahashi (3)		
26 May	Pepsi Ube Open	Yamaguchi	40,000,000	(Taiwan) Chen Tze-ming (4)		
2 Jun	Mitsubishi Galant Tournament	Okayama	50,000,000	(Australia) Brian Jones (2)		
9 Jun	Tohoku Classic	Miyagi	35,000,000	(United States) David Ishii (1)		
16 Jun	Sapporo Tokyu Open	Hokkaidō	40,000,000	(Japan) Teruo Sugihara (22)		
23 Jun	Yomiuri Sapporo Beer Open	Hyōgo	40,000,000	(Japan) Tsuneyuki Nakajima (19)		
30 Jun	Mizuno Open	Ishikawa	40,000,000	(Japan) Tateo Ozaki (3) (Japan) Katsunari Takahashi (4)		Title shared
7 Jul	Kansai Pro Championship	Osaka	20,000,000	(Japan) Keiichi Kobayashi (1)		
7 Jul	Kanto Pro Championship	Shizuoka	27,000,000	(Japan) Tsuneyuki Nakajima (20)		
4 Aug	NST Niigata Open	Niigata	35,000,000	(Taiwan) Hsieh Min-Nan (11)		
11 Aug	Japan PGA Championship	Ibaraki	40,000,000	(Japan) Tateo Ozaki (4)		
18 Aug	Nikkei Cup	Saitama	40,000,000	(Japan) Naomichi Ozaki (4)		New tournament
25 Aug	Maruman Open	Ishikawa	40,000,000	(Australia) Brian Jones (3)		
1 Sep	KBC Augusta	Fukuoka	42,000,000	(Japan) Hajime Meshiai (1)		
8 Sep	Kyusyu Open	Fukuoka	12,000,000	(Japan) Kinpachi Yoshimura (1)		
8 Sep	Kansai Open	Hyōgo	20,000,000	(Japan) Tsutomu Irie (2)		
8 Sep	Kanto Open	Saitama	30,000,000	(Japan) Seiichi Kanai (8)		
8 Sep	Chushikoku Open	Hiroshima	10,000,000	(Japan) Mitoshi Tomita (1)		
8 Sep	Chubu Open	Mie	15,000,000	(Japan) Masahiro Shiota (1)		
8 Sep	Hokkaido Open	Hokkaidō	7,280,000	(Japan) Katsunari Takahashi (5)		
15 Sep	Suntory Open	Chiba	60,000,000	(Japan) Tateo Ozaki (5)		
22 Sep	ANA Open	Hokkaidō	50,000,000	(Japan) Tsuneyuki Nakajima (21)		
29 Sep	Gene Sarazen Jun Classic	Tochigi	50,000,000	(Japan) Kazushige Kono (1) (Japan) Masahiro Kuramoto (12) (United States) Payne Stewart (n/a)		Title shared
6 Oct	Tokai Classic	Aichi	50,000,000	(Australia) Graham Marsh (16)		
13 Oct	Japan Open Golf Championship	Aichi	60,000,000	(Japan) Tsuneyuki Nakajima (22)		
20 Oct	Polaroid Cup Golf Digest Tournament	Shizuoka	60,000,000	(United States) D. A. Weibring (n/a)		
27 Oct	Bridgestone Open	Chiba	70,000,000	(Japan) Masahiro Kuramoto (13)		
3 Nov	ABC Japan-U.S. Match	Hyōgo	65,000,000	(Japan) Tateo Ozaki (6) (United States) Corey Pavin (n/a)		Title shared
10 Nov	Hiroshima Open	Hiroshima	40,000,000	(Japan) Yoshitaka Yamamoto (10)		
17 Nov	Taiheiyo Club Masters	Shizuoka	80,000,000	(Japan) Tsuneyuki Nakajima (23)		
24 Nov	Dunlop Phoenix Tournament	Miyazaki	120,000,000	(Japan) Tsuneyuki Nakajima (24)		
1 Dec	Casio World Open	Kagoshima	80,000,000	(United States) Hubert Green (n/a)		
8 Dec	Golf Nippon Series	Tokyo	30,000,000	(Japan) Tateo Ozaki (7)		
15 Dec	Daikyo Open	Okinawa	60,000,000	(Japan) Seiichi Kanai (9)		

== Money list ==
The money list was based on prize money won during the season, calculated in Japanese yen.

Position	Player	Prize money (¥)
1	(Japan) Tsuneyuki Nakajima	101,609,333
2	(Japan) Masahiro Kuramoto	58,767,582
3	(Japan) Tateo Ozaki	42,782,235
4	(Japan) Seiichi Kanai	41,341,664
5	(Japan) Teruo Sugihara	39,703,266

== Japan Challenge Tour ==
1985 Japan Challenge Tour season
- Duration: 29 August 1985 – 8 November 1985
- Number of official events: 2

The 1985 Japan Challenge Tour was the inaugural season of the Japan Challenge Tour, the official development tour to the PGA of Japan Tour.

=== Schedule ===
The following table lists official events during the 1985 season.

Date	Tournament	Location	Purse (¥)	Winner (Note: The number in brackets after each winner's name is the number of Japan Challenge Tour events they had won up to and including that tournament. It is rare for someone to accumulate many wins on the Japan Challenge Tour as success at this level usually leads to promotion to the PGA of Japan Tour.)
30 Aug	Kanto Kokusai Open	Tochigi	12,000,000	(Japan) Isamu Sugita (1)
8 Nov	Mito Green Open	Ibaraki	12,000,000	(Japan) Tomohiro Maruyama (1)
