= Saburo Fujiki =

Japanese golfer (born 1955)

Saburo Fujiki 藤木 三郎
Personal information
- Nationality: Japan
- Born: 16 February 1955 (age 71) Kuwana, Mie, Japan
- Height: 1.80 m (5 ft 11 in)
- Weight: 100 kg (220 lb; 16 st)

Career
- Sport: Golf
- Status: Professional
- Former tour: Japan Golf Tour
- Professional wins: 14

Number of wins by tour
- Japan Golf Tour: 14

Best results in major championships
- Masters Tournament: DNP
- PGA Championship: DNP
- U.S. Open: DNP
- The Open Championship: 59th: 1984

Saburo Fujiki (藤木 三郎, Fujiki Saburō; born 16 February 1955) is a Japanese professional golfer.

== Career ==
Fujiki was born in Mie. He won 14 tournaments on the Japan Golf Tour. In his only major appearance, he finished 59th at the 1984 Open Championship.

== Professional wins (14) ==
=== PGA of Japan Tour wins (14) ===
No.	Date	Tournament	Winning score	Margin of victory	Runner(s)-up
1	5 Apr 1981	Aso National Park Open	−3 (75-67-71=213)	1 stroke	(Japan) Yoshikazu Yokoshima
2	19 Jul 1981	Descente Cup Hokkoku Open	−6 (67-68-74-73=282)	2 strokes	(Japan) Katsuji Hasegawa, (Japan) Masahiro Kuramoto
3	28 Aug 1983	KBC Augusta	−15 (69-68-68-68=273)	3 strokes	(Japan) Masashi Ozaki
4	4 Sep 1983	Kanto Open	+2 (71-71-74-70=286)	Playoff	(Japan) Kikuo Arai, (Japan) Masashi Ozaki
5	17 Jun 1984	Yomiuri Open	−11 (69-71-70-71=281)	4 strokes	(Japan) Shinsaku Maeda
6	29 Jul 1984	NST Niigata Open	−13 (67-68-68-68=271)	1 stroke	(Japan) Haruo Yasuda
7	30 Aug 1987	KBC Augusta (2)	−14 (67-69-70-68=274)	2 strokes	(Japan) Tateo Ozaki
8	11 Dec 1988	Daikyo Open	−14 (66-72-66-70=274)	1 stroke	(Japan) Motomasa Aoki, (United States) David Ishii, (Australia) Graham Marsh
9	2 Jul 1989	Kanto Pro Championship	−11 (69-68-70-70=277)	1 stroke	(Japan) Akiyoshi Ohmachi
10	17 Jun 1990	Yomiuri Sapporo Beer Open (2)	−11 (71-68-66=205) (Note: Shortened to 54 holes due to weather.)	1 stroke	(Japan) Taisei Inagaki
11	21 Oct 1990	Bridgestone Open (2)	−14 (67-72-66-69=274)	Playoff	(Japan) Akihito Yokoyama
12	10 Mar 1991	Daiichi Fudosan Cup	−17 (68-71-67-65=271)	1 stroke	(Australia) Brian Jones
13	12 May 1991	Fujisankei Classic	−5 (69-68-72-70=279)	Playoff	(Japan) Isao Aoki, (Australia) Brian Jones, (Japan) Hideki Kase
14	3 Oct 1993	Tokai Classic	−14 (68-70-67-69=274)	4 strokes	(Japan) Hajime Meshiai

PGA of Japan Tour playoff record (3–6)

No.	Year	Tournament	Opponent(s)	Result
1	1983	Pocari-Sweat Hakuryuko Open	(Japan) Shinsaku Maeda, (Japan) Hiroshi Makino, (Australia) Graham Marsh	Makino won with birdie on second extra hole after three-hole aggregate playoff; Fujiki: −1 (3-4-4=11), Makino: −1 (3-4-4=11), Marsh: +1 (3-5-5=13), Maeda: +2 (4-5-5=14)
2	1983	JPGA East-West Tournament	(Japan) Tsuneyuki Nakajima	Lost to birdie on second extra hole
3	1983	Kanto Open	(Japan) Kikuo Arai, (Japan) Masashi Ozaki	Won with par on third extra hole Arai eliminated by par on first hole
4	1984	Kanto Pro Championship	(Japan) Pete Izumikawa	
5	1986	Hiroshima Open	(Japan) Tōru Nakamura	Lost to par on fourth extra hole
6	1989	Nikkei Cup	(Japan) Yoshimi Niizeki	Lost to par on first extra hole
7	1989	Suntory Open	(United States) Larry Nelson	Lost to birdie on first extra hole
8	1990	Bridgestone Open	(Japan) Akihito Yokoyama	Won with birdie on first extra hole
9	1991	Fujisankei Classic	(Japan) Isao Aoki, (Australia) Brian Jones, (Japan) Hideki Kase	Won with birdie on second extra hole

== Team appearances ==
- World Cup (representing Japan): 1983
- Four Tours World Championship (representing Japan): 1990

== See also ==
- List of golfers with most Japan Golf Tour wins
