= Motomasa Aoki =

Japanese professional golfer

Personal information
- Nationality: Japan
- Born: 18 May 1950 (age 76) Miyagi Prefecture, Japan
- Height: 1.88 m (6 ft 2 in)
- Weight: 86 kg (190 lb; 13.5 st)

Career
- Sport: Golf
- Status: Professional
- Former tour: Japan Golf Tour
- Professional wins: 3

Number of wins by tour
- Japan Golf Tour: 2
- Other: 1

Motomasa Aoki (青木 基正, Aoki Motomasa; born 18 May 1950) is a Japanese professional golfer.

== Professional career ==
Aoki played on the Japan Golf Tour, winning twice.

== Professional wins (3) ==
=== PGA of Japan Tour wins (2) ===
No.	Date	Tournament	Winning score	Margin of victory	Runner(s)-up
1	1 Aug 1982	Kanto Pro Championship	−14 (70-65-67-72=274)	2 strokes	(Japan) Kenji Mori
2	14 Apr 1985	Pocari Sweat Open	−2 (74-71-66=211) (Note: Shortened to 54 holes due to weather.)	2 strokes	(Japan) Akira Yabe, (Japan) Nobumitsu Yuhara

=== Japan Challenge Tour wins (1) ===
- 1988 Mito Green Open
