= 1983 PGA of Japan Tour =

Golf tour season

1983 PGA of Japan Tour season
- Duration: 17 March 1983 – 11 December 1983
- Number of official events: 46
- Most wins: (Japan) Tsuneyuki Nakajima (8)
- Money list: (Japan) Tsuneyuki Nakajima

The 1983 PGA of Japan Tour was the 11th season of the PGA of Japan Tour, the main professional golf tour in Japan since it was formed in 1973.

== Schedule ==
The following table lists official events during the 1983 season.

Date	Tournament	Location	Purse (¥)	Winner(s) (Note: The number in brackets after each winner's name is the number of PGA of Japan Tour events they had won up to and including that tournament. This information is only shown for PGA of Japan Tour members.)	Other tours (Note: AGC − Asia Golf Circuit.)	Notes
20 Mar	Shizuoka Open	Shizuoka	30,000,000	(Japan) Tsuneyuki Nakajima (9)		
27 Mar	KSB Setonaikai Open	Kagawa	15,000,000	(Japan) Kenji Sogame (1)		New to PGA of Japan Tour
3 Apr	Kuzuha Kokusai Tournament	Osaka	15,000,000	(Japan) Kikuo Arai (4)		
10 Apr	Pocari-Sweat Hakuryuko Open	Hiroshima	30,000,000	(Japan) Hiroshi Makino (1)		
17 Apr	Bridgestone Aso Open	Kumamoto	30,000,000	(Japan) Fujio Kobayashi (5)		
24 Apr	Dunlop International Open	Ibaraki	40,000,000	(United States) Larry Nelson (n/a)	AGC	
1 May	Chunichi Crowns	Aichi	70,000,000	(Taiwan) Chen Tze-ming (2)		
8 May	Fujisankei Classic	Shizuoka	40,000,000	(Japan) Nobumitsu Yuhara (3)		
15 May	Japan PGA Match-Play Championship	Ibaraki	32,000,000	(Japan) Tsuneyuki Nakajima (10)		
22 May	Mitsubishi Galant Tournament	Iwate	50,000,000	(Japan) Tsuneyuki Nakajima (11)		
29 May	Pepsi Ube Open	Yamaguchi	30,000,000	(Japan) Seiichi Kanai (5)		
5 Jun	Tohoku Classic	Miyagi	32,000,000	(Japan) Yutaka Hagawa (3)		
12 Jun	Sapporo Tokyu Open	Hokkaidō	35,000,000	(Japan) Isao Aoki (34)		
19 Jun	Yomiuri Open	Hyōgo	30,000,000	(Australia) Graham Marsh (15)		
26 Jun	Mizuno Tournament	Ishikawa	30,000,000	(Japan) Eitaro Deguchi (2)		
3 Jul	Kansai Pro Championship	Hyōgo	15,000,000	(Japan) Yoshitaka Yamamoto (9)		
3 Jul	Kanto Pro Championship	Gunma	30,000,000	(Japan) Isao Aoki (35)		
9 Jul	Toyamaken Open	Toyama	15,000,000	(Japan) Kikuo Arai (5)		
17 Jul	Gunmaken Open	Gunma	15,000,000	(Japan) Masaru Amono (3)		
17 Jul	Descente Osaka Open	Kyoto	15,000,000	(Japan) Teruo Sugihara (20)		
24 Jul	Niigata Open	Niigata	15,000,000	(Japan) Hideto Shigenobu (3)		
24 Jul	Kanagawa Open	Kanagawa	15,000,000	(Japan) Takaaki Kono (2)		
31 Jul	Japan PGA Championship	Niigata	35,000,000	(Japan) Tsuneyuki Nakajima (12)		
7 Aug	Descente Cup Hokkoku Open	Ishikawa	30,000,000	(Japan) Shozo Miyamoto (2)		
14 Aug	JPGA East-West Tournament	Chiba	18,000,000	(Japan) Tsuneyuki Nakajima (13)		
21 Aug	Acom Doubles	Shiga	40,000,000	(Taiwan) Lu Hsi-chuen (2) and (Taiwan) Lu Liang-Huan (7)		New team event
28 Aug	KBC Augusta	Fukuoka	40,000,000	(Japan) Saburo Fujiki (3)		
3 Sep	Chushikoku Open	Okayama	5,800,000	(Japan) Masahiro Kuramoto (8)		
4 Sep	Chubu Open	Gifu	12,000,000	(Japan) Teruo Nakamura (1)		
4 Sep	Kyusyu Open	Fukuoka	12,000,000	(Japan) Noboru Fujiike (1)		
4 Sep	Kansai Open	Hyōgo	15,000,000	(Japan) Susumu Wakita (1)		
4 Sep	Kanto Open	Nagano	20,000,000	(Japan) Saburo Fujiki (4)		
4 Sep	Hokkaido Open	Hokkaidō	5,000,000	(Japan) Katsunari Takahashi (1)		
11 Sep	Suntory Open	Chiba	50,000,000	(Japan) Tsuneyuki Nakajima (14)		
18 Sep	ANA Sapporo Open	Hokkaidō	40,000,000	(Japan) Tsuneyuki Nakajima (15)		
25 Sep	Hiroshima Open	Hiroshima	30,000,000	(Japan) Katsunari Takahashi (2)		
2 Oct	Japan Open Golf Championship	Hyōgo	50,000,000	(Japan) Isao Aoki (36)		
9 Oct	Tokai Classic	Aichi	40,000,000	(Japan) Masahiro Kuramoto (9)		
16 Oct	Golf Digest Tournament	Shizuoka	40,000,000	(Japan) Seiichi Kanai (6)		
23 Oct	Bridgestone Tournament	Chiba	60,000,000	(Japan) Eitaro Deguchi (3)		
30 Oct	Gene Sarazen Jun Classic	Tochigi	50,000,000	(Japan) Masashi Ozaki (26)		
13 Nov	Goldwin Cup Japan vs USA	Hyōgo	US$440,000	(Japan) Tsuneyuki Nakajima (16)		
20 Nov	Dunlop Phoenix Tournament	Miyazaki	100,000,000	(Taiwan) Chen Tze-ming (3)		
27 Nov	Casio World Open	Kagoshima	70,000,000	(West Germany) Bernhard Langer (n/a)		
4 Dec	Golf Nippon Series	Tokyo	20,000,000	(Japan) Isao Aoki (37)		
11 Dec	Daikyo Open	Okinawa	25,000,000	(Japan) Masaji Kusakabe (8)		New to PGA of Japan Tour

== Money list ==
The money list was based on prize money won during the season, calculated in Japanese yen.

Position	Player	Prize money (¥)
1	(Japan) Tsuneyuki Nakajima	85,514,183
2	(Japan) Isao Aoki	58,508,614
3	(Japan) Masahiro Kuramoto	49,247,776
4	(Japan) Kikuo Arai	41,782,074
5	(Japan) Saburo Fujiki	39,038,137
