= Brian Jones (golfer) =

Australian professional golfer

Personal information
- Nationality: Australia
- Born: 12 September 1951 (age 75) Sydney, Australia
- Height: 1.69 m (5 ft 7 in)
- Weight: 72 kg (159 lb; 11.3 st)

Career
- Sport: Golf
- Turned professional: 1971
- Former tours: PGA of Japan Tour; Asia Golf Circuit; PGA Tour of Australia; European Seniors Tour
- Professional wins: 21

Number of wins by tour
- Japan Golf Tour: 11
- PGA Tour of Australasia: 4
- European Senior Tour: 1
- Other: 5

Best results in major championships
- Masters Tournament: DNP
- PGA Championship: DNP
- U.S. Open: DNP
- The Open Championship: T8: 1981

Brian Jones (born 12 September 1951) is an Australian professional golfer.

== Career ==
Jones was born in Sydney. He turned professional in 1971. He played on the throughout Asia and Australasia including on the Japan Golf Tour. He won the Indian Open two times, five times in Australasia, and twelve times in Japan. He won 11 events on the Japan Golf Tour between 1977 and 1993.

Jones played in multiple Open Championships; his best performance coming at the 1981 Open Championship, where he finished in a tie for 8th place.

Jones played on the European Seniors Tour from 2002 to 2005, winning the 2002 De Vere Hotels Seniors Classic.

== Personal life ==
Jones married Sachiko, a Japanese woman, in the early 1980s.

== Professional wins (21) ==
=== PGA of Japan Tour wins (11) ===
No.	Date	Tournament	Winning score	Margin of victory	Runner(s)-up
1	28 Aug 1977	KBC Augusta	−10 (73-72-68-65=278)	Playoff	(Japan) Akira Yabe
2	2 Jun 1985	Mitsubishi Galant Tournament	−12 (67-70-72-63=272)	Playoff	(Japan) Nobumitsu Yuhara
3	25 Aug 1985	Maruman Open	−9 (70-70-70-69=279)	1 stroke	(Japan) Teruo Suzumura
4	20 Apr 1986	Bridgestone Aso Open	−12 (70-69-67-34=240) (Note: Shortened to 63 holes due to weather.)	1 stroke	(Japan) Nobumitsu Yuhara
5	31 May 1987	Mitsubishi Galant Tournament (2)	−5 (70-70-71-72=283)	3 strokes	(Japan) Nobuo Serizawa, (Japan) Koichi Suzuki
6	29 May 1988	Mitsubishi Galant Tournament (3)	−17 (68-68-67-68=271)	Playoff	(Japan) Naomichi Ozaki
7	2 Oct 1988	Tokai Classic	−14 (69-69-71-65=274)	3 strokes	(Japan) Koichi Suzuki
8	29 Oct 1989	ABC Lark Cup	−8 (70-69-69-72=280)	4 strokes	(Japan) Toshiaki Sudo
9	4 Mar 1990	Daiichi Fudosan Cup	−13 (71-66-70-68=275)	2 strokes	(Japan) Hideki Kase
10	24 Jun 1990	Mizuno Open	−16 (73-66-66-67=272)	4 strokes	(Japan) Tsuneyuki Nakajima
11	13 Jun 1993	Sapporo Tokyu Open	−14 (69-67-69-69=274)	3 strokes	(Japan) Akiyoshi Ohmachi

PGA of Japan Tour playoff record (3–4)

No.	Year	Tournament	Opponent(s)	Result
1	1976	Pepsi-Wilson Tournament	(Australia) Graham Marsh, (Japan) Shozo Miyamoto, (Australia) Peter Thomson	Thomson won with par on fourteenth extra hole Jones eliminated by par on fourth hole Miyamoto eliminated by par on first hole
2	1977	KBC Augusta	(Japan) Akira Yabe	Won with par on second extra hole
3	1985	Mitsubishi Galant Tournament	(Japan) Nobumitsu Yuhara	Won with birdie on fourth extra hole
4	1988	Mitsubishi Galant Tournament	(Japan) Naomichi Ozaki	Won with birdie on first extra hole
5	1988	ANA Open	(Japan) Naomichi Ozaki	Lost to par on third extra hole
6	1988	Polaroid Cup Golf Digest Tournament	(Japan) Masashi Ozaki	Lost to birdie on first extra hole
7	1991	Fujisankei Classic	(Japan) Isao Aoki, (Japan) Saburo Fujiki, (Japan) Hideki Kase	Fujiki won with birdie on second extra hole

=== Asia Golf Circuit wins (3) ===
No.	Date	Tournament	Winning score	Margin of victory	Runners-up
1	19 Mar 1972	Indian Open	−10 (70-72-70-70=282)	2 strokes	(Philippines) Ben Arda, (Australia) Peter Thomson
2	3 Apr 1977	Indian Open (2)	−4 (69-70-76-69=284)	1 stroke	(Myanmar) Mya Aye, (Japan) Yoshikazu Hayashi, (Australia) Peter Thomson
3	19 Mar 1978	Malaysian Open	−12 (69-71-66-70=276)	6 strokes	(Philippines) Ben Arda, (Australia) Stewart Ginn, (United States) Mike Krantz

=== PGA Tour of Australia wins (4) ===
No.	Date	Tournament	Winning score	Margin of victory	Runner(s)-up
1	5 Oct 1980	Barclays Australian Classic	+1 (74-73-68-74=289)	2 strokes	(Australia) John Clifford
2	4 Jan 1981	New Zealand PGA Championship	−4 (69-67-71-73=280)	Playoff	(New Zealand) Dennis Clark, (New Zealand) John Lister
3	2 Dec 1984	Air New Zealand Shell Open	−14 (66-67-67-66=266)	2 strokes	(Australia) Wayne Grady
4	1 Feb 1987	Foster's Tattersall Tasmanian Open	−5 (69-70-74-70=283)	1 stroke	(United States) Mike Colandro

PGA Tour of Australia playoff record (1–2)

No.	Year	Tournament	Opponents	Result
1	1976	New South Wales PGA Championship	(United States) Marty Bohen, (Australia) Mark Tapper	Tapper won 18-hole playoff; Tapper: −1 (71), Bohen: E (72), Jones: +1 (73)
2	1976	Tasmanian Open	(Australia) Stewart Ginn, (Australia) David Good, (Australia) Ian Stanley	Good won with birdie on fifth extra hole Ginn and Stanley eliminated by par on first hole
3	1981	New Zealand PGA Championship	(New Zealand) Dennis Clark, (New Zealand) John Lister	Won with birdie on fourth extra hole Clark eliminated by par on second hole

=== Other wins (2) ===
- 1970 Western Australia Open
- 1985 Acom Doubles (with Mike Ferguson) (Japan)

=== European Seniors Tour wins (1) ===
No.	Date	Tournament	Winning score	Margin of victory	Runners-up
1	1 Sep 2002	De Vere Hotels Seniors Classic	−9 (70-68-69=207)	7 strokes	(England) Tommy Horton

== Results in major championships ==
Tournament	1976	1977	1978	1979	1980	1981	1982	1983	1984	1985	1986	1987	1988	1989	1990
The Open Championship	CUT			CUT		T8	CUT					T59			CUT

Top 10
Did not play

CUT = missed the half-way cut (3rd round cut in 1976, 1979 and 1982 Open Championships)
"T" indicates a tie for a place
Note: Jones only played in The Open Championship.

== Team appearances ==
- World Cup (representing Australia): 1990
- Four Tours World Championship (representing Australasia): 1985, 1986, 1987, 1988, 1989, 1990 (winners)

== See also ==
- List of golfers with most Japan Golf Tour wins
