= Nobuo Serizawa =

Japanese professional golfer

Nobuo Serizawa 芹澤 信雄
Personal information
- Nationality: Japan
- Born: 10 November 1959 (age 66) Gotemba, Shizuoka, Japan
- Height: 1.73 m (5 ft 8 in)
- Weight: 70 kg (150 lb; 11 st)

Career
- Sport: Golf
- Turned professional: 1982
- Current tour: Japan Golf Tour
- Professional wins: 7

Number of wins by tour
- Japan Golf Tour: 5
- Other: 2

Best results in major championships
- Masters Tournament: DNP
- PGA Championship: DNP
- U.S. Open: DNP
- The Open Championship: CUT: 1989

Nobuo Serizawa (芹澤 信雄, Serizawa Nobuo; born 10 November 1959) is a Japanese professional golfer.

== Career ==
Serizawa played on the Japan Golf Tour, winning five times.

== Professional wins (7) ==
=== Japan Golf Tour wins (5) ===
| No. | Date | Tournament | Winning score | Margin of victory | Runner(s)-up |
|---|---|---|---|---|---|
| 1 | 16 Aug 1987 | Nikkei Cup | −7 (70-70-71-66=277) | 1 stroke | (Japan) Masashi Ozaki, (Japan) Naomichi Ozaki, (Japan) Masahiro Shiota |
| 2 | 10 Dec 1989 | Daikyo Open | −17 (67-67-67-70=271) | 4 strokes | (United States) David Ishii |
| 3 | 14 Mar 1993 | Imperial Open | −1 (71-73-68=212) | 1 stroke | (Australia) Brian Jones |
| 4 | 1 Sep 1996 | Japan PGA Match-Play Championship Promise Cup | 1 up | | (United States) Brandt Jobe |
| 5 | 12 Mar 2000 | Token Corporation Cup | −7 (68-70-73-70=281) | 1 stroke | (Japan) Satoshi Higashi, (Japan) Katsunori Kuwabara |

Japan Golf Tour playoff record (0–4)

| No. | Year | Tournament | Opponents | Result |
|---|---|---|---|---|
| 1 | 1987 | Bridgestone Open | (United States) David Ishii, (Japan) Hiroshi Makino | Ishii won with birdie on fifth extra hole Makino eliminated by par on first hole |
| 2 | 1992 | Sapporo Tokyu Open | (Japan) Kazuhiro Takami, (Japan) Nobumitsu Yuhara | Yuhara won with birdie on first extra hole |
| 3 | 1994 | Maruman Open | (United States) David Ishii, (Japan) Hirofumi Miyase | Ishii won with birdie on first extra hole |
| 4 | 1996 | Dydo Drinco Shizuoka Open | (Paraguay) Carlos Franco, (Japan) Yoshikazu Sakamoto | Sakamoto won with par on first extra hole |

=== Other wins (1) ===
- 1987 Acom Team Championship (with Tomohiro Maruyama)

=== Japan PGA Senior Tour wins (1) ===
- 2010 Fuji Film Senior Championship

== Results in major championships ==
| Tournament | 1989 |
|---|---|
| The Open Championship | CUT |

CUT = missed the halfway cut
Note: Serizawa only played in The Open Championship.

== Team appearances ==
- World Cup (representing Japan): 1991
- Alfred Dunhill Cup (representing Japan): 1987, 1994, 1995, 1998
- Four Tours World Championship (representing Japan): 1988, 1990

== See also ==
- Serizawa Nobuo no Birdie Try (Super Famicom video game endorsed by Nobuo Serizawa)
