= Tateo Ozaki =

Japanese professional golfer (born 1954)

Tateo Ozaki 尾崎 健夫
Personal information
- Nickname: Jet
- Nationality: Japan
- Born: 9 January 1954 (age 72) Kaiyō, Tokushima, Japan
- Height: 1.81 m (5 ft 11 in)
- Weight: 81 kg (179 lb; 12.8 st)

Career
- Sport: Golf
- Turned professional: 1977
- Former tour: Japan Golf Tour
- Professional wins: 21

Number of wins by tour
- Japan Golf Tour: 15
- Other: 6

Best results in major championships
- Masters Tournament: DNP
- PGA Championship: DNP
- U.S. Open: DNP
- The Open Championship: T52: 1989

Tateo "Jet" Ozaki (尾崎 健夫, Ozaki Tateo; born 9 January 1954) is a Japanese professional golfer.

== Career ==
Ozaki was born in Kaiyō, Tokushima. He turned professional in 1977. He won 15 tournaments on the Japan Golf Tour and ranks 13th on the career victories list.

He is the brother of Masashi "Jumbo" and Naomichi "Joe", two prominent golfers on the Japan Golf Tour.

== Professional wins (21) ==
=== Japan Golf Tour wins (15) ===
No.	Date	Tournament	Winning score	Margin of victory	Runner(s)-up
1	8 Apr 1984	Hakuryuko Pocari Sweat Open	−7 (68-75-65-69=277)	2 strokes	(Japan) Kikuo Arai
2	6 May 1984	Fujisankei Classic	−4 (69-68-72-71=280)	Playoff	(Taiwan) Hsieh Min-Nan
3	30 Jun 1985	Mizuno Open	−11 (71-69-65=205) (Note: Shortened to 54 holes due to weather.)	Shared title with (Japan) Katsunari Takahashi	
4	11 Aug 1985	Japan PGA Championship	−4 (72-71-72-73=288)	Playoff	(Japan) Seiichi Kanai
5	15 Sep 1985	Suntory Open	−13 (67-71-70-67=275)	Playoff	(United States) Larry Nelson
6	3 Nov 1985	ABC Japan-U.S. Match	−12 (66-73-69-68=276)	Shared title with (United States) Corey Pavin	
7	8 Dec 1985	Golf Nippon Series	−11 (72-69-67-71=279)	2 strokes	(Japan) Masahiro Kuramoto
8	26 Oct 1986	Bridgestone Open	−12 (71-67-68-70=276)	2 strokes	(Japan) Naomichi Ozaki
9	14 Dec 1986	Daikyo Open	−7 (69-69-69-70=277)	Playoff	(Japan) Kikuo Arai
10	24 Jul 1988	Japan PGA Championship (2)	−20 (69-69-66-64=268)	1 stroke	(Japan) Masashi Ozaki
11	11 Sep 1988	Suntory Open (2)	−14 (67-71-68-68=274)	3 strokes	(Japan) Tadami Ueno
12	28 May 1989	Mitsubishi Galant Tournament	−4 (72-67-74-71=284)	2 strokes	(Japan) Masanobu Kimura
13	24 Sep 1989	Gene Sarazen Jun Classic	−9 (73-70-70-66=279)	Playoff	(Japan) Naomichi Ozaki
14	28 Mar 1993	TaylorMade KSB Open	−12 (68-67-70-71=276)	1 stroke	(Australia) Roger Mackay
15	7 May 2000	Fujisankei Classic (2)	−6 (70-69-69-70=278)	1 stroke	(Japan) Nobuhito Sato, (Taiwan) Yeh Chang-ting

Japan Golf Tour playoff record (5–3)

No.	Year	Tournament	Opponent	Result
1	1983	Hiroshima Open	(Japan) Katsunari Takahashi	Lost to par on third extra hole
2	1984	Fujisankei Classic	(Taiwan) Hsieh Min-Nan	Won with par on first extra hole
3	1985	Japan PGA Championship	(Japan) Seiichi Kanai	Won with birdie on first extra hole
4	1985	Suntory Open	(United States) Larry Nelson	Won with par on second extra hole
5	1986	Daikyo Open	(Japan) Kikuo Arai	Won with par on third extra hole
6	1989	Gene Sarazen Jun Classic	(Japan) Naomichi Ozaki	Won with par on second extra hole
7	1991	Maruman Open	(Japan) Tetsu Nishikawa	Lost to birdie on third extra hole
8	1998	Bridgestone Open	(Japan) Nobuhito Sato	Lost to birdie on first extra hole

=== Other wins (1) ===
- 1979 Hakuryuko Open

=== Japan Senior PGA Tour wins (5) ===
- 2006 PGA Philanthropy Rebornest Senior Open
- 2007 Japan PGA Senior Championship
- 2008 Fancl Classic
- 2009 Fancl Classic
- 2014 Komatsu Open

== Results in major championships ==
Tournament	1985	1986	1987	1988	1989
The Open Championship	CUT		T66		T52

Note: Ozaki only played in The Open Championship.
CUT = missed the half-way cut
"T" = tied

== Team appearances ==
- World Cup (representing Japan): 1985, 1988
- Four Tours World Championship (representing Japan): 1985, 1986 (winners), 1987, 1989
- Dunhill Cup (representing Japan): 1986, 1988

== See also ==
- Spring 1981 PGA Tour Qualifying School graduates
- List of golfers with most Japan Golf Tour wins
