= The Crowns =

Golf tournament

Tournament information
- Location: Tōgō, Aichi, Japan
- Established: 1960
- Courses: Nagoya Golf Club (Wagō Course)
- Par: 70
- Length: 6,557 yards (5,996 m)
- Tour: Japan Golf Tour
- Prize fund: ¥110,000,000
- Month played: April

Tournament record score
- Aggregate: 260 Masashi Ozaki (1995)
- To par: −20 as above

Current champion
- (Japan) Mikumu Horikawa

Final champion
- Location in Japan Location in the Aichi Prefecture

The Crowns (中日クラウンズ, Chūnichi kuraunzu) is a professional golf tournament that is played over Nagoya Golf Club's Wagō Course in Tōgō, Aichi, Japan. Founded in 1960, it has been an event on the Japan Golf Tour schedule since the tour's first season in 1973.

== History ==
The Crowns was established as the Invitation by Chūbu Japan, All Japan Amateur and Professional Golf Championship (中部日本招待全日本アマ・プロゴルフ選手権) in 1960. The concept of the championship was competition among amateur and professional golf players. It has been played over the Wagō Course at Nagoya Golf Club every year except between 1962 and 1965, during which time it was held at Aichi Country Club (1962 and 1965) and Miyoshi Country Club (1963 and 1964).

From the 10th anniversary in 1969 to the 50th anniversary in 2009, the tournament's official name was "International Invitational Golf THE CROWNS (国際招待ゴルフ 中日クラウンズ, Kokusai shōtai gorufu Chūnichi kuraunzu)", as organizers invited international golfers. Winners during this time include major champions Peter Thomson, David Graham, Scott Simpson, Greg Norman, Seve Ballesteros, Davis Love III, Darren Clarke and Justin Rose.

The tournament record is 260 (20 under par), set by Masashi Ozaki in 1995. In 2010, Ryo Ishikawa recorded a Tour record final round of 58 (12 under par) to take the title by five strokes. From 2002 to 2019 the purse was ¥120,000,000 with ¥24,000,000 going to the winner. This was reduced to ¥100,000,000 in 2021.

== Winners ==
Year	Winner	Score	To par	Margin of victory	Runner(s)-up
The Crowns
2026	(Japan) Mikumu Horikawa	264	−16	1 stroke	(Japan) Yusaku Hosono
2025	(Japan) Yosuke Asaji	273	−7	1 stroke	(Japan) Hiroshi Iwata (Japan) Yūsaku Miyazato
2024	(Japan) Ren Yonezawa	267	−13	1 stroke	(Japan) Naoyuki Kataoka
2023	(Japan) Hiroshi Iwata (2)	265	−15	3 strokes	(Japan) Rikuya Hoshino
2022	(Japan) Yuki Inamori	264	−16	3 strokes	(South Korea) Hwang Jung-gon
2021	(Japan) Hiroshi Iwata	198 (Note: Shortened to 54 holes due to weather.)	−12	3 strokes	(Japan) Katsumasa Miyamoto
2020	Cancelled due to the COVID-19 pandemic				
2019	(Japan) Katsumasa Miyamoto	271	−9	1 stroke	(Japan) Shugo Imahira
2018	(South Korea) Yang Yong-eun	268	−12	4 strokes	(South Korea) Hwang Jung-gon (Australia) Anthony Quayle
2017	(Japan) Yūsaku Miyazato	267	−13	1 stroke	(Japan) Yoshinori Fujimoto (Japan) Toru Taniguchi
2016	(South Korea) Kim Kyung-tae	270	−10	Playoff	(Japan) Daisuke Kataoka
2015	(South Korea) Jang Ik-jae (2)	270	−10	4 strokes	(Japan) Tomohiro Kondo (Japan) Hideto Tanihara (Japan) Kazuhiro Yamashita
2014	(South Korea) Kim Hyung-sung	269	−11	4 strokes	(South Korea) Jang Ik-jae
2013	(Japan) Michio Matsumura	278	−2	1 stroke	(Japan) Hideki Matsuyama
2012	(South Korea) Jang Ik-jae	272	−8	2 strokes	(Australia) Steven Conran (Japan) Yoshikazu Haku
2011	(Australia) Brendan Jones	271	−9	Playoff	(South Korea) Jang Ik-jae
2010	(Japan) Ryo Ishikawa	267	−13	5 strokes	(Japan) Hiroyuki Fujita (Australia) Paul Sheehan
2009	(Japan) Tetsuji Hiratsuka	263	−17	7 strokes	(Japan) Kenichi Kuboya
2008	(Japan) Tomohiro Kondo	271	−9	Playoff	(Japan) Hiroyuki Fujita
2007	(Japan) Hirofumi Miyase	278	−2	Playoff	(Japan) Toru Taniguchi
2006	(Japan) Shingo Katayama (2)	262	−18	2 strokes	(Japan) Nozomi Kawahara
2005	(Japan) Naomichi Ozaki	269	−11	Playoff	(Australia) Steven Conran
2004	(Japan) Shingo Katayama	264	−16	2 strokes	(Australia) Paul Sheehan
2003	(Japan) Hidemasa Hoshino	270	−10	3 strokes	(Japan) Toshimitsu Izawa (Myanmar) Zaw Moe (Japan) Taichi Teshima
2002	(England) Justin Rose	266	−14	5 strokes	(Thailand) Prayad Marksaeng
2001	(Northern Ireland) Darren Clarke	267	−13	4 strokes	(Japan) Keiichiro Fukabori (Japan) Shinichi Yokota
2000	(Japan) Hidemichi Tanaka	272	−8	5 strokes	(Japan) Mitsutaka Kusakabe
1999	(Japan) Yasuharu Imano	271	−9	1 stroke	(Japan) Naomichi Ozaki
1998	(United States) Davis Love III	269	−11	8 strokes	(Canada) Rick Gibson (Japan) Masanobu Kimura (United States) Brian Watts
1997	(Japan) Masashi Ozaki (5)	267	−13	2 strokes	(United States) Brian Watts
1996	(Japan) Masashi Ozaki (4)	268	−12	4 strokes	(Japan) Katsuyoshi Tomori
1995	(Japan) Masashi Ozaki (3)	260	−20	5 strokes	(Japan) Nobuo Serizawa
1994	(Australia) Roger Mackay	269	−11	2 strokes	(Japan) Naomichi Ozaki
1993	(Australia) Peter Senior	270	−10	1 stroke	(United States) Gary Hallberg (Japan) Masashi Ozaki
1992	(Japan) Masashi Ozaki (2)	270	−10	4 strokes	(Canada) Brent Franklin (Australia) Peter Senior
1991	(Spain) Seve Ballesteros	275	−5	1 stroke	(Australia) Roger Mackay
1990	(Japan) Noboru Sugai	276	−4	Playoff	(United States) Steve Pate
1989	(Australia) Greg Norman	272	−8	3 strokes	(United States) Blaine McCallister (Japan) Koichi Suzuki
1988	(United States) Scott Simpson (2)	278	−2	3 strokes	(United States) David Ishii (Japan) Masashi Ozaki
1987	(Japan) Masashi Ozaki	268	−12	6 strokes	(Japan) Isao Aoki (Australia) Ian Baker-Finch (Japan) Masahiro Kuramoto (Japan) Yoshitaka Yamamoto
Chunichi Crowns
1986	(United States) David Ishii	274	−6	4 strokes	(Japan) Tsuneyuki Nakajima
1985	(Japan) Seiji Ebihara	276	−4	2 strokes	(Japan) Tsuneyuki Nakajima
1984	(United States) Scott Simpson	275	−5	Playoff	(Japan) Isao Aoki
1983	(Taiwan) Chen Tze-ming	280	E	Playoff	(Japan) Kikuo Arai (United States) David Ishii
1982	(United States) Gary Hallberg	272	−8	3 strokes	(Japan) Shigeru Uchida
1981	(Australia) Graham Marsh (2)	277	−3	2 strokes	(United States) D. A. Weibring
1980	(Japan) Isao Aoki (5)	280	E	2 strokes	(Australia) Graham Marsh
1979	(Japan) Isao Aoki (4)	279	−1	1 stroke	(Japan) Tōru Nakamura (Japan) Haruo Yasuda
1978	(Japan) Isao Aoki (3)	270	−10	5 strokes	(Japan) Masashi Ozaki
1977	(Australia) Graham Marsh	280	E	4 strokes	(Japan) Kenji Mori
1976	(Australia) David Graham	276	−4	1 stroke	(Japan) Yasuhiro Miyamoto
1975	(Japan) Isao Aoki (2)	272	−8	1 stroke	(Japan) Teruo Sugihara
1974	(Japan) Takashi Murakami	272	−8	6 strokes	(Japan) Masashi Ozaki
1973	(Japan) Isao Aoki	270	−10	1 stroke	(Taiwan) Lu Liang-Huan
1972	(Australia) Peter Thomson (2)	266	−14	6 strokes	(New Zealand) Terry Kendall
1971	(Taiwan) Lu Liang-Huan	274	−6	3 strokes	(Australia) Peter Thomson
1970	(Japan) Haruo Yasuda (2)	268	−12	3 strokes	(Japan) Teruo Suzumura
1969	(Australia) Peter Thomson	274	−6	Playoff	(Japan) Tadashi Kitta
1968	(Japan) Haruo Yasuda	278	−2	Playoff	(Japan) Hisashi Suzumura
1967	(Taiwan) Hsieh Yung-yo	273	−7	1 stroke	(Japan) Hisashi Suzumura
1966	(Japan) Shigeru Uchida	274	−6	1 stroke	(Japan) Tadashi Kitta (Japan) Haruyoshi Kobari
1965	(Japan) Tadashi Kitta (2)	291	−5	1 stroke	(Japan) Teruo Sugihara
1964	(Japan) Teruo Sugihara	294	+6	1 stroke	(Japan) Torakichi Nakamura
1963	(Japan) Kenji Hosoishi	290	+2	2 strokes	(Japan) Teruo Sugihara
1962	(Japan) Tadashi Kitta	299	+3	1 stroke	(Japan) Torakichi Nakamura
1961	(Japan) Tomoo Ishii	280	E	Playoff	(United States) Orville Moody
1960	(Japan) Torakichi Nakamura	277	−3	1 stroke	(Japan) Koichi Ono
