= Tsuruya Open =

Tournament information
- Location: Kawanishi, Hyōgo, Japan
- Established: 1994
- Course: Yamanohara Golf Club
- Par: 71
- Length: 6,804 yards (6,222 m)
- Tour: Japan Golf Tour
- Format: Stroke play
- Prize fund: ¥110,000,000
- Month played: April
- Final year: 2014

Tournament record score
- Aggregate: 265 Tomohiro Kondo (2011)
- To par: −19 as above

Final champion
- (Japan) Hiroyuki Fujita
- Location in Japan Location in the Hyōgo Prefecture

The Tsuruya Open (つるやオープンゴルフトーナメント, Tsuruya ōpun gorufu tōnamento) was a professional golf tournament on the Japan Golf Tour. It was played annually from 1994 to 2014 on the Yamanohara Course at Yamanohara Golf Club, formerly Sports Shinko Country Club, near Kawanishi, Hyōgo.

The tournament scoring records of 265 (−19) were set by Tomohiro Kondo in 2011. In its final year in 2014, the purse was ¥110,000,000 with ¥22,000,000 going to the winner.

== Winners ==
Year	Winner	Score	To par	Margin of victory	Runner(s)-up
2014	(Japan) Hiroyuki Fujita (3)	271	−13	Playoff	(South Korea) Park Sang-hyun
2013	(Japan) Hideki Matsuyama	266	−18	1 stroke	(United States) David Oh
2012	(Japan) Hiroyuki Fujita (2)	269	−15	4 strokes	(South Korea) Lee Kyoung-hoon
2011	(Japan) Tomohiro Kondo	265	−19	4 strokes	(South Korea) Bae Sang-moon (Japan) Nobuhiro Masuda
2010	(Japan) Hiroyuki Fujita	199 (Note: Shortened to 54 holes due to weather.)	−14	Playoff	(Japan) Toru Taniguchi
2009	(Japan) Masaya Tomida	198	−15	2 strokes	(New Zealand) David Smail
2008	(South Korea) Hur Suk-ho	272	−12	1 stroke	(South Korea) Kim Kyung-tae
2007	(Australia) Brendan Jones (3)	268	−16	2 strokes	(Japan) Masahiro Kuramoto (Japan) Hirofumi Miyase (Japan) Toru Taniguchi
2006	(Australia) Brendan Jones (2)	273	−11	2 strokes	(Japan) Mamo Osanai
2005	(Japan) Naomichi Ozaki (2)	271	−13	3 strokes	(Japan) Ryoken Kawagishi (Australia) Paul Sheehan
2004	(Australia) Brendan Jones	275	−9	2 strokes	(Japan) Keiichiro Fukabori (Australia) Scott Laycock (Japan) Tatsuya Mitsuhashi (Japan) Taichi Teshima (Japan) Shinichi Yokota
2003	(Japan) Hirofumi Miyase	270	−14	Playoff	(Japan) Takashi Kanemoto (Japan) Hisayuki Sasaki
2002	(United States) Dean Wilson	273	−11	2 strokes	(Japan) Toru Taniguchi
2001	(Japan) Hidemichi Tanaka	274	−14	2 strokes	(Japan) Masayuki Kawamura
2000	(Australia) Richard Backwell	278	−10	Playoff	(Japan) Hidemichi Tanaka
1999	(Japan) Naomichi Ozaki	273	−15	2 strokes	(Japan) Toru Suzuki
1998	(Japan) Katsumasa Miyamoto	271	−17	1 stroke	(Australia) Peter McWhinney
1997	(Japan) Mitsuo Harada	279	−9	4 strokes	(Japan) Shigeki Maruyama
1996	(Australia) Peter McWhinney	276	−12	1 stroke	(Australia) Peter Senior
1995	(Japan) Satoshi Higashi	279	−9	1 stroke	(Japan) Kōki Idoki (Japan) Katsunori Kuwabara (Australia) Roger Mackay (Japan) Kiyoshi Maita (Japan) Yoshi Mizumaki
1994	(Japan) Tsuneyuki Nakajima	279	−9	Playoff	(Japan) Tsutomu Higa
