= Mitsui Sumitomo Visa Taiheiyo Masters =

Golf tournament

Tournament information
- Location: Gotemba, Shizuoka, Japan
- Established: 1972
- Courses: Taiheiyo Club (Gotemba Course)
- Par: 70
- Length: 7,262 yards (6,640 m)
- Tour: Japan Golf Tour
- Format: Stroke play
- Prize fund: ¥200,000,000
- Month played: November

Tournament record score
- Aggregate: 263 Kota Kaneko (2025)
- To par: −23 Hideki Matsuyama (2016)

Current champion
- (Japan) Shugo Imahira

Location map
- Location in Japan Location in the Shizuoka Prefecture

The Taiheiyo Masters, titled since 2001 as the Mitsui Sumitomo Visa Taiheiyo Masters (三井住友Visa太平洋マスターズ, Mitsui sumitomo biza taiheiyō masutāzu) for sponsorship reasons, is a professional golf tournament on the Japan Golf Tour. Founded in 1972, it was promoted as the Pacific Masters and for a few years was the richest golf tournament in the world with a prize fund of US$300,000. It remains one of the richest tournaments in Japan, attracting some of the leading international golfers.

The tournament was played at Sobu Country Club near Inzai, Chiba until 1976. Since 1977 it has been contested on Taiheiyo Club's Gotemba Course near Gotemba, Shizuoka. Its title sponsors are Sumitomo Mitsui Banking Corporation and Visa. Previous names include Taiheiyo Club Masters, Toshiba Taiheiyo Masters, Visa Taiheiyo Club Masters, and Sumitomo Visa Taiheiyo Masters.

The inaugural tournament went into a playoff between America's Gay Brewer and Australia's David Graham. It was a three-hole aggregate playoff, the first ever instituted in a golf tournament. Before that, playoffs were either decided in a full round or sudden death. Brewer won the event.

== Tournament hosts ==
Years	Venue	Location
1977–present	Taiheiyo Club, Gotemba Course	Gotemba, Shizuoka
1972–1976	Sobu Country Club	Inzai, Chiba

== Winners ==
Year	Tour (Note: JPN − Japan Golf Tour.)	Winner	Score	To par	Margin of victory	Runner(s)-up
Mitsui Sumitomo Visa Taiheiyo Masters
2026	JPN	(Japan) Shugo Imahira (2)	196 (Note: Shortened to 54 holes due to weather.)	−14	4 strokes	(Japan) Yosuke Asaji (Japan) Tomoyo Ikemura (Japan) Riki Kawamoto
2025	JPN	(Japan) Kota Kaneko	263	−17	6 strokes	(South Korea) Lee Sang-hee
2024	JPN	(Japan) Ryo Ishikawa (4)	269	−11	1 stroke	(Japan) Riki Kawamoto (Japan) Hideto Tanihara
2023	JPN	(Japan) Shugo Imahira	268	−12	1 stroke	(Japan) Taiki Yoshida
2022	JPN	(Japan) Ryo Ishikawa (3)	272	−8	Playoff	(Japan) Rikuya Hoshino
2021	JPN	(Japan) Hideto Tanihara (2)	274	−6	1 stroke	(Japan) Takumi Kanaya
2020	JPN	(Japan) Jinichiro Kozuma	272	−8	1 stroke	(Japan) Ryosuke Kinoshita
2019	JPN	(Japan) Takumi Kanaya (a)	267	−13	1 stroke	(South Africa) Shaun Norris
2018	JPN	(Japan) Tatsunori Nukaga	201	−9	2 strokes	(South Korea) Kim Seung-hyuk
2017	JPN	(Japan) Satoshi Kodaira	270	−18	3 strokes	(Japan) Yūsaku Miyazato
2016	JPN	(Japan) Hideki Matsuyama (2)	265	−23	7 strokes	(South Korea) Song Young-han
2015	JPN	(Japan) Shingo Katayama (2)	202	−14	1 stroke	(Thailand) Thanyakon Khrongpha
2014	JPN	(United States) David Oh	276	−12	1 stroke	(Japan) Toshinori Muto
2013	JPN	(Japan) Hideto Tanihara	275	−13	1 stroke	(Japan) Ryo Ishikawa (Japan) Masahiro Kawamura (Japan) Tomohiro Kondo
2012	JPN	(Japan) Ryo Ishikawa (2)	273	−15	1 stroke	(Japan) Michio Matsumura
2011	JPN	(Japan) Hideki Matsuyama (a)	203	−13	2 strokes	(Japan) Toru Taniguchi
2010	JPN	(Japan) Ryo Ishikawa	274	−14	2 strokes	(Australia) Brendan Jones
2009	JPN	(Japan) Yasuharu Imano	275	–13	2 strokes	(Japan) Kenichi Kuboya (United States) Han Lee
2008	JPN	(Japan) Shingo Katayama	272	−16	Playoff	(Japan) Yasuharu Imano
2007	JPN	(Australia) Brendan Jones	274	−14	1 stroke	(Japan) Toru Taniguchi
2006	JPN	(Japan) Tsuneyuki Nakajima	275	−13	1 stroke	(Japan) Toru Taniguchi
2005	JPN	(Northern Ireland) Darren Clarke (2)	270	−18	2 strokes	(Japan) Mitsuhiro Tateyama
2004	JPN	(Northern Ireland) Darren Clarke	266	−22	6 strokes	(Japan) Nozomi Kawahara (England) Lee Westwood
2003	JPN	(Japan) Kiyoshi Murota	272	−16	6 strokes	(United States) Ben Curtis (Japan) Hiroyuki Fujita (South Korea) Kim Jong-duck
2002	JPN	(Japan) Tsuneyuki Nakajima	272	−16	1 stroke	(Japan) Hidemichi Tanaka
2001	JPN	(Japan) Toshimitsu Izawa	270	−18	2 strokes	(Japan) Yūsaku Miyazato (a) (Japan) Shigeru Nonaka
Sumitomo Visa Taiheiyo Masters
2000	JPN	(Japan) Toshimitsu Izawa	274	−14	1 stroke	(Japan) Keiichiro Fukabori
1999	JPN	(Japan) Hirofumi Miyase	274	−14	Playoff	(Northern Ireland) Darren Clarke (Japan) Ryoken Kawagishi
1998	JPN	(England) Lee Westwood (3)	275	−13	2 strokes	(Japan) Masashi Ozaki
1997	JPN	(England) Lee Westwood (2)	272	−16	1 stroke	(Japan) Masashi Ozaki (Japan) Naomichi Ozaki
1996	JPN	(England) Lee Westwood	206	−10	Playoff	(Italy) Costantino Rocca (United States) Jeff Sluman
1995	JPN	(Japan) Satoshi Higashi	274	−14	4 strokes	(Japan) Shigeki Maruyama
1994	JPN	(Japan) Masashi Ozaki	270	−18	5 strokes	(United States) Bob Estes
1993	JPN	(Australia) Greg Norman	272	−16	1 stroke	(Japan) Yoshi Mizumaki
Visa Taiheiyo Club Masters
1992	JPN	(Japan) Masashi Ozaki	276	−12	1 stroke	(Japan) Masahiro Kuramoto (Germany) Bernhard Langer (Japan) Tsukasa Watanabe
1991	JPN	(Australia) Roger Mackay	272	−16	2 strokes	(United States) Yoshinori Kaneko
1990	JPN	(Spain) José María Olazábal (2)	270	−18	5 strokes	(Germany) Bernhard Langer (Japan) Masashi Ozaki
1989	JPN	(Spain) José María Olazábal	203	−13	3 strokes	(Japan) Isao Aoki (Japan) Naomichi Ozaki
1988	JPN	(Spain) Seve Ballesteros	281	−7	3 strokes	(Japan) Yasuhiro Funatogawa
1987	JPN	(Australia) Graham Marsh	276	−12	1 stroke	(United States) Tom Watson
1986	JPN	(Japan) Yasuhiro Funatogawa	274	−14	2 strokes	(United States) Larry Nelson
Taiheiyo Club Masters
1985	JPN	(Japan) Tsuneyuki Nakajima	280	−8	Playoff	(Australia) David Graham
1984	JPN	(Japan) Shinsaku Maeda	275	−13	1 stroke	(Japan) Kikuo Arai (Japan) Naomichi Ozaki
1983: No tournament
1982	JPN	(United States) Scott Hoch	278	−10	3 strokes	(Japan) Masahiro Kuramoto
Toshiba Taiheiyo Masters
1981	JPN	(United States) Danny Edwards	276	−12	3 strokes	(United States) Jerry Pate (United States) Tom Watson
1980	JPN	(Japan) Norio Suzuki (2)	282	−6	Playoff	(Japan) Masashi Ozaki
Taiheiyo Club Masters
1979	JPN	(Japan) Norio Suzuki	280	−8	2 strokes	(United States) Rod Curl (United States) Bill Rogers (United States) Tom Watson
Sumitomo Visa Taiheiyo Masters
1978	JPN	(United States) Gil Morgan	273	−11	3 strokes	(United States) Jerry Pate
Taiheiyo Club Masters
1977	JPN	(United States) Bill Rogers	275	−9	1 stroke	(United States) Mike Morley (Japan) Teruo Sugihara
1976	JPN	(United States) Jerry Pate	279	−5	2 strokes	(Japan) Isao Aoki
1975	JPN	(United States) Gene Littler (2)	278	−6	1 stroke	(United States) Lee Elder (United States) Hubert Green (United States) Allen Miller (Japan) Masashi Ozaki
1974		(United States) Gene Littler	279	−5	5 strokes	(United States) Bert Yancey
1973	JPN	(Japan) Masashi Ozaki	278	−6	Playoff	(United States) Bert Yancey
1972		(United States) Gay Brewer	276	−8	Playoff	(Australia) David Graham
