= Takashi Kanemoto =

Japanese professional golfer

Takashi Kanemoto 兼本貴司
Personal information
- Nationality: Japan
- Born: 12 December 1970 (age 55) Hiroshima Prefecture, Japan
- Height: 1.78 m (5 ft 10 in)
- Weight: 70 kg (150 lb; 11 st)

Career
- Sport: Golf
- Turned professional: 1993
- Current tour: Japan PGA Senior Tour
- Former tour: Japan Golf Tour
- Professional wins: 7

Number of wins by tour
- Japan Golf Tour: 2
- Other: 5

Takashi Kanemoto (Japanese: 兼本貴司; born 12 December 1970) is a Japanese professional golfer.

== Career ==
Kanemoto was born in Hiroshima Prefecture. He played on the Japan Golf Tour where he won twice: the 2009 Mitsubishi Diamond Cup Golf and the 2010 The Championship by Lexus.

== Professional wins (7) ==
=== Japan Golf Tour wins (2) ===
No.	Date	Tournament	Winning score	Margin of victory	Runner-up
1	31 May 2009	Mitsubishi Diamond Cup Golf	−5 (72-76-68-67=283)	Playoff	(Australia) Brendan Jones
2	11 Jul 2010	The Championship by Lexus	−18 (70-66-68-66=270)	1 stroke	(Japan) Makoto Inoue

Japan Golf Tour playoff record (1–2)

No.	Year	Tournament	Opponent(s)	Result
1	2003	Tsuruya Open	(Japan) Hirofumi Miyase, (Japan) Hisayuki Sasaki	Miyase won with par on first extra hole
2	2009	Mitsubishi Diamond Cup Golf	(Australia) Brendan Jones	Won with birdie on third extra hole
3	2010	Coca-Cola Tokai Classic	(Japan) Hiroyuki Fujita, (Japan) Michio Matsumura	Matsumura won with par on third extra hole Kanemoto eliminated by par on first hole

=== Japan Challenge Tour wins (1) ===
No.	Date	Tournament	Winning score	Margin of victory	Runners-up
1	22 Sep 2007	SYNX Novil Cup	−10 (68-66=134)	1 stroke	(Japan) Koji Iwasaka, (Japan) Yasuo Oshima, (Japan) Toshikazu Sugihara, (Japan) Akinori Tani

=== Other wins (2) ===
- 2000 Chushikoku Open (Japan)
- 2001 Chushikoku Open (Japan)

=== Japan PGA Senior Tour wins (1) ===
No.	Date	Tournament	Winning score	Margin of victory	Runner(s)-up
1	22 Apr 2022	Nojima Champion Cup Hakone Senior Tournament	−12 (65-67=132)	Playoff	(Japan) Yoichi Shimizu
2	19 Apr 2024	Nojima Champion Cup Hakone Senior Tournament (2)	−10 (65-67=132)	3 strokes	(South Korea) Jang Ik-jae, (Japan) Shingo Katayama
