= Hideto Tanihara =

Japanese professional golfer

Hideto Tanihara 谷原 秀人
Personal information
- Nationality: Japan
- Born: 16 November 1978 (age 47) Onomichi, Hiroshima, Japan
- Height: 1.78 m (5 ft 10 in)
- Weight: 80 kg (180 lb; 13 st)
- Spouse: Ayaka Nagate (m. 2008)

Career
- Sport: Golf
- Turned professional: 2001
- Current tour: Japan Golf Tour
- Former tours: PGA Tour; European Tour; LIV Golf
- Professional wins: 20
- Highest ranking: 47 (4 June 2017)

Number of wins by tour
- Japan Golf Tour: 19
- Asian Tour: 2
- Other: 1

Best results in major championships
- Masters Tournament: CUT: 2007, 2017
- PGA Championship: T33: 2016
- U.S. Open: T51: 2016
- The Open Championship: T5: 2006

Achievements and awards
- Japan Golf Tour Rookie of the Year: 2003
Medal record
Asian Games
Gold medal – first place	1998 Bangkok	Men's team

Hideto Tanihara (谷原 秀人, Tanihara Hideto; born 16 November 1978) is a Japanese professional golfer. He has won 18 tournaments on the Japan Golf Tour.

== Professional career ==
Tanihara has won 14 tournaments on the Japan Golf Tour and featured in the top 50 of the Official World Golf Ranking. His highest ranking came in June 2017 when he reached 47th. He finished tied for fifth place in the 2006 Open Championship and reached the semi-finals of the 2017 WGC-Dell Technologies Match Play. His best finish outside of Japan was a second-place finish at the 2016 New Zealand Open, an official event on the Australasian Tour. He has represented Japan four times in the World Cup.

== Personal life ==
On 14 July 2008, it was announced that he and actress Ayaka Nagate had married.

== Professional wins (20) ==
=== Japan Golf Tour wins (19) ===
Legend
Japan majors (3)
Other Japan Golf Tour (16)

No.	Date	Tournament	Winning score	Margin of victory	Runner(s)-up
1	22 Jun 2003	Mandom Lucido Yomiuri Open	−16 (65-71-64=200)*	3 strokes	(Japan) Nobuhito Sato
2	21 Dec 2003 (2004 season)	Asia Japan Okinawa Open^{1}	−9 (66-76-68-69=279)	3 strokes	(South Korea) Joon Chung, (Japan) Hiroshi Gohda, (Japan) Yūsaku Miyazato, (South Korea) Ted Oh, (South Korea) Charlie Wi, (Scotland) Simon Yates, (Japan) Tsuyoshi Yoneyama
3	4 Jun 2006	JCB Classic Sendai	−18 (67-69-63-67=266)	5 strokes	(Japan) Shingo Katayama
4	6 Aug 2006	Sun Chlorella Classic	−5 (70-74-67-72=283)	1 stroke	(Japan) Hiroyuki Fujita, (Japan) Tetsuji Hiratsuka, (Thailand) Prayad Marksaeng, (Japan) Katsumasa Miyamoto, (Japan) Masaya Tomida
5	2 Sep 2007	Fujisankei Classic	−8 (67-71-67=205)*	3 strokes	(Thailand) Prayad Marksaeng
6	9 Sep 2007	Suntory Open	−8 (65-71-66=202)*	2 strokes	(Japan) Toru Taniguchi
7	25 May 2008	Munsingwear Open KSB Cup	−18 (65-67-65-73=270)	3 strokes	(Japan) Shingo Katayama, (Japan) Katsunori Kuwabara, (Japan) Nobuhito Sato
8	28 Sep 2008	Asia-Pacific Panasonic Open^{1}	−16 (66-68-64-66=264)	1 stroke	(Japan) Azuma Yano
9	29 Aug 2010	Vana H Cup KBC Augusta	−22 (67-66-67-66=266)	1 stroke	(Japan) Mitsuhiro Tateyama
10	17 Nov 2013	Mitsui Sumitomo Visa Taiheiyo Masters	−13 (66-69-67-73=275)	1 stroke	(Japan) Ryo Ishikawa, (Japan) Masahiro Kawamura, (Japan) Tomohiro Kondo
11	8 Nov 2015	Heiwa PGM Championship	−11 (67-67-66-69=269)	2 strokes	(Japan) Yoshinori Fujimoto
12	3 Jul 2016	Shigeo Nagashima Invitational Sega Sammy Cup	−14 (70-65-67-72=274)	2 strokes	(Thailand) Thanyakon Khrongpha
13	10 Jul 2016	Japan PGA Championship Nissin Cupnoodle Cup	−22 (68-70-65-63=266)	Playoff	(Japan) Toshinori Muto
14	6 Nov 2016	Heiwa PGM Championship (2)	−12 (68-64-66-70=268)	Playoff	(Japan) Yuta Ikeda
15	14 Nov 2021	Mitsui Sumitomo Visa Taiheiyo Masters (2)	−6 (71-66-67-70=274)	1 stroke	(Japan) Takumi Kanaya
16	5 Dec 2021	Golf Nippon Series JT Cup	−12 (68-67-64-69=268)	2 strokes	(Japan) Yūsaku Miyazato
17	4 Dec 2022	Golf Nippon Series JT Cup (2)	−12 (66-67-70-65=268)	1 stroke	(Japan) Hiroshi Iwata, (Japan) Daijiro Izumida, (United States) Chan Kim
18	25 Jun 2023	Japan Players Championship	−24 (67-65-66-66=264)	Playoff	(Japan) Taiga Nagano
19	17 Sep 2023	ANA Open	−18 (68-69-66-67=270)	1 stroke	(Japan) Koshiro Maeda, (South Korea) Song Young-han

*Note: Tournament shortened to 54 holes due to weather.
^{1}Co-sanctioned by the Asian Tour

Japan Golf Tour playoff record (3–2)

No.	Year	Tournament	Opponent(s)	Result
1	2013	Fujisankei Classic	(Japan) Hideki Matsuyama, (South Korea) Park Sung-joon	Matsuyama won with birdie on second extra hole
2	2014	ANA Open	(Japan) Katsumasa Miyamoto	Lost to par on first extra hole
3	2016	Japan PGA Championship Nissin Cupnoodle Cup	(Japan) Toshinori Muto	Won with par on first extra hole
4	2016	Heiwa PGM Championship	(Japan) Yuta Ikeda	Won with birdie on first extra hole
5	2023	Japan Players Championship	(Japan) Taiga Nagano	Won with par on first extra hole

=== Japan Challenge Tour wins (1) ===
No.	Date	Tournament	Winning score	Margin of victory	Runners-up
1	4 Oct 2002	PRGR Cup (Kansai)	−11 (67-66=133)	4 strokes	(Japan) Takashi Kamiyama, (Japan) Nobuhiro Masuda

== Results in major championships ==
Tournament	2003	2004	2005	2006	2007	2008	2009
Masters Tournament					CUT		
U.S. Open							
The Open Championship	CUT			T5	CUT	CUT	
PGA Championship				T55			

Tournament	2010	2011	2012	2013	2014	2015	2016	2017	2018
Masters Tournament								CUT	
U.S. Open							T51	CUT	
The Open Championship							CUT	CUT	CUT
PGA Championship					CUT		T33	T67	

Top 10
Did not play

CUT = missed the half-way cut
"T" = tied for place

=== Summary ===
Tournament	Wins	2nd	3rd	Top-5	Top-10	Top-25	Events	Cuts made
Masters Tournament	0	0	0	0	0	0	2	0
U.S. Open	0	0	0	0	0	0	2	1
The Open Championship	0	0	0	1	1	1	7	1
PGA Championship	0	0	0	0	0	0	4	3
Totals	0	0	0	1	1	1	15	5

- Most consecutive cuts made – 2 (2006 Open Championship – 2006 PGA)
- Longest streak of top-10s – 1

== Results in World Golf Championships ==
Results not in chronological order prior to 2015.

Tournament	2007	2008	2009	2010	2011	2012	2013	2014	2015	2016	2017
Championship	70										T32
Match Play											4
Invitational											T50
Champions										T54	T20

Top 10
Did not play

QF, R16, R32, R64 = Round in which player lost in match play
"T" = tied
Note that the HSBC Champions did not become a WGC event until 2009.

== Team appearances ==
Amateur

- Bonallack Trophy (representing Asia/Pacific): 2000

Professional

- World Cup (representing Japan): 2006, 2007, 2013, 2018
- Royal Trophy (representing Asia): 2009 (winners)
- EurAsia Cup (representing Asia): 2014, 2018
- Amata Friendship Cup (representing Japan): 2018

== See also ==
- 2004 PGA Tour Qualifying School graduates
- List of golfers with most Japan Golf Tour wins
