= Casio World Open =

Tournament information
- Location: Geisei, Kōchi, Japan
- Established: 1981
- Course: Kochi Kuroshio Country Club
- Par: 72
- Length: 7,335 yards (6,707 m)
- Tour: Japan Golf Tour
- Format: Stroke play
- Prize fund: ¥180,000,000
- Month played: November

Tournament record score
- Aggregate: 256 Chan Kim (2022)
- To par: −32 as above

Current champion
- (Japan) Ryuichi Oiwa

Final champion
- Location in Japan Location in the Kōchi Prefecture

The Casio World Open (カシオワールドオープンゴルフトーナメント, Kashio wārudo ōpun gorufu tōnamento) is a professional golf tournament on the Japan Golf Tour. Founded in 1981, it is played in November and is one of the richest tournaments in Japan, attracting some of the leading international golfers. It was held at the Ibusuki Golf Club, Kaimon Course in Ibusuki, Kagoshima from 1981 to 2004. In 2005, it moved to the Kochi Kuroshio Country Club in Geisei, Kōchi.

The event is organized by Casio, Kuroshio Kanko Kaihatsu and TV Kochi.

== Winners ==
Year	Winner	Score	To par	Margin of victory	Runner(s)-up
2025	(Japan) Ryuichi Oiwa	267	−21	Playoff	(Japan) Kosuke Sunagawa
2024	(Japan) Hiroshi Iwata	274	−14	1 stroke	(Japan) Taisei Shimizu
2023	(Japan) Taichi Nabetani	274	−14	1 stroke	(South Korea) Song Young-han (Japan) Ren Yonezawa
2022	(United States) Chan Kim	256	−32	6 strokes	(Japan) Aguri Iwasaki
2021	(Japan) Mikumu Horikawa	269	−19	2 strokes	(Japan) Shugo Imahira (Japan) Yūsaku Miyazato
2020	Cancelled due to the COVID-19 pandemic				
2019	(South Korea) Kim Kyung-tae	268	−20	2 strokes	(South Africa) Shaun Norris
2018	(South Korea) Choi Ho-sung	273	−15	1 stroke	(Australia) Brendan Jones
2017	(United States) Seungsu Han	275	−13	1 stroke	(Japan) Ryo Ishikawa (Australia) Brendan Jones (South Korea) Kim Kyung-tae (Japan) Ryuko Tokimatsu
2016	(Japan) Yuta Ikeda	203 (Note: Shortened to 54 holes due to weather.)	−13	1 stroke	(Japan) Ryuji Masaoka
2015	(South Korea) Hwang Jung-gon (2)	273	−15	1 stroke	(Japan) Ryo Ishikawa
2014	(Japan) Shingo Katayama	271	−17	3 strokes	(Japan) Satoshi Tomiyama
2013	(Japan) Hideki Matsuyama	276	−12	1 stroke	(Japan) Yuta Ikeda
2012	(South Korea) Hwang Jung-gon	269	−19	3 strokes	(Japan) Kunihiro Kamii
2011	(Japan) Tadahiro Takayama	273	−15	2 strokes	(Japan) Yūsaku Miyazato
2010	(Japan) Michio Matsumura	275	−13	Playoff	(South Korea) Kim Do-hoon
2009	(Japan) Koumei Oda (2)	267	−21	3 strokes	(Japan) Ryo Ishikawa
2008	(Japan) Koumei Oda	277	−11	3 strokes	(Japan) Kenichi Kuboya
2007	(Japan) Taichi Teshima	275	−13	1 stroke	(Australia) Chris Campbell
2006	(India) Jeev Milkha Singh	272	−16	2 strokes	(New Zealand) David Smail
2005	(Japan) Toru Taniguchi	277	−11	2 strokes	(South Korea) Kim Jong-duck
2004	(New Zealand) David Smail (2)	276	−12	1 stroke	(United States) Hunter Mahan
2003	(Japan) Katsumune Imai	264	−24	7 strokes	(Australia) Brendan Jones (Japan) Shingo Katayama
2002	(New Zealand) David Smail	200	−16	2 strokes	(Australia) Brendan Jones
2001	(Japan) Kiyoshi Murota	264	−24	2 strokes	(Fiji) Dinesh Chand
2000	(Japan) Toru Suzuki	267	−21	1 stroke	(Japan) Masashi Ozaki
1999	(Japan) Tsuyoshi Yoneyama	274	−14	1 stroke	(Japan) Taichi Teshima
1998	(United States) Brian Watts	274	−14	Playoff	(Japan) Toshimitsu Izawa
1997	(Japan) Mitsutaka Kusakabe	278	−10	1 stroke	(Japan) Keiichiro Fukabori (Japan) Hirofumi Miyase (Japan) Naomichi Ozaki
1996	(United States) Paul Stankowski	277	−11	Playoff	(United States) David Ishii
1995	(Japan) Seiki Okuda	274	−14	1 stroke	(Japan) Masashi Ozaki
1994	(United States) Robert Gamez	271	−17	4 strokes	(United States) Scott Hoch
1993	(United States) Tom Lehman	274	−14	1 stroke	(United States) Phil Mickelson
1992	(Japan) Isao Aoki (2)	277	−11	2 strokes	(Taiwan) Chen Tze-ming
1991	(Japan) Naomichi Ozaki	270	−18	2 strokes	(Japan) Hajime Meshiai
1990	(United States) Mike Reid	274	−14	2 strokes	(Japan) Yoshinori Kaneko
1989	(Japan) Isao Aoki	274	−14	1 stroke	(United States) Larry Mize
1988	(United States) Larry Mize	284	−4	1 stroke	(Japan) Masashi Ozaki
1987	(United States) David Ishii	276	−12	2 strokes	(Scotland) Sam Torrance
1986	(United States) Scott Hoch (2)	276	−12	6 strokes	(Spain) José María Olazábal
1985	(United States) Hubert Green	289	+1	Playoff	(Australia) Wayne Grady (United States) Scott Hoch (Japan) Nobumitsu Yuhara
1984	(Scotland) Sandy Lyle	279	−9	Playoff	(United States) Gary Koch
1983	(West Germany) Bernhard Langer	287	−1	2 strokes	(Japan) Tsuneyuki Nakajima
1982	(United States) Scott Hoch	282	−6	1 stroke	(Japan) Tsuneyuki Nakajima
1981	(United States) Lee Trevino	275	−13	4 strokes	(Japan) Isao Aoki
