= Brendan Jones (golfer) =

Australian professional golfer (born 1975)

Personal information
- Full name: Brendan Mark Jones
- Nationality: Australia
- Born: 3 March 1975 (age 51) West Wyalong, New South Wales, Australia
- Height: 1.85 m (6 ft 1 in)
- Weight: 82 kg (181 lb; 12.9 st)

Career
- Sport: Golf
- Turned professional: 1999
- Current tours: PGA Tour Champions; PGA Tour of Australasia
- Former tours: PGA Tour; Nationwide Tour; Japan Golf Tour; Asian Tour
- Professional wins: 20
- Highest ranking: 52 (14 December 2008)

Number of wins by tour
- Japan Golf Tour: 15
- Asian Tour: 2
- PGA Tour of Australasia: 1
- Korn Ferry Tour: 1
- Other: 3

Best results in major championships
- Masters Tournament: DNP
- PGA Championship: T24: 2009
- U.S. Open: CUT: 2004, 2012
- The Open Championship: T70: 2008

Achievements and awards
- Japan Golf Tour Rookie of the Year: 2002

Brendan Mark Jones (born 3 March 1975) is an Australian professional golfer who plays on the Japan Golf Tour, where he has won 15 times between 2002 and 2019.

== Amateur career ==
Jones has a successful amateur career. He was part of the Australian team that took silver medal in the 1998 Eisenhower Trophy and he won the Australian Amateur in 1999, beating Mahal Pearce 2&1 in the final.

== Professional career ==
In 1999, Jones turned professional. He played two tournaments on the 2000 Japan Golf Tour and has played regularly on the tour since 2001.

In 2005, Jones was a member of the PGA Tour. Despite finishing in a tie for second at the B.C. Open, he narrowly failed to win enough money to retain his tour card. He has featured in the top 100 of the Official World Golf Ranking reaching as high as 52 during 2011.

== Awards and honors ==
In 2002, Jones was the Japan Golf Tour Rookie of the Year

== Amateur wins ==
this list may be incomplete

- 1995 New South Wales Amateur
- 1996 New South Wales Medal (tied with Scott Gardiner and Nathan Green)
- 1997 New South Wales Medal
- 1998 Riversdale Cup
- 1999 Australian Amateur, Master of the Amateurs

== Professional wins (20) ==
=== Japan Golf Tour wins (15) ===
Legend
Japan majors (1)
Other Japan Golf Tour (14)

No.	Date	Tournament	Winning score	Margin of victory	Runner(s)-up
1	3 Nov 2002	Philip Morris K.K. Championship	−19 (65-67-67-70=269)	2 strokes	(Japan) Toshimitsu Izawa
2	10 Aug 2003	Sun Chlorella Classic	−8 (71-73-68-68=280)	Playoff	(Japan) Daisuke Maruyama, (Japan) Taichi Teshima
3	25 Apr 2004	Tsuruya Open	−9 (64-73-69-69=275)	2 strokes	(Japan) Keiichiro Fukabori, (Australia) Scott Laycock, (Japan) Tatsuya Mitsuhashi, (Japan) Taichi Teshima, (Japan) Shinichi Yokota
4	27 Jun 2004	Gateway to The Open Mizuno Open	−14 (67-68-70-69=274)	Playoff	(Japan) Hiroaki Iijima
5	23 Apr 2006	Tsuruya Open (2)	−11 (70-68-66-69=273)	2 strokes	(Japan) Mamo Osanai
6	22 Apr 2007	Tsuruya Open (3)	−16 (67-65-68-68=268)	2 strokes	(Japan) Masahiro Kuramoto, (Japan) Hirofumi Miyase, (Japan) Takuya Taniguchi
7	11 Nov 2007	Mitsui Sumitomo Visa Taiheiyo Masters	−13 (67-68-69-70=274)	5 strokes	(Japan) Toru Taniguchi
8	2 Dec 2007	Golf Nippon Series JT Cup	−11 (70-70-68-61=269)	1 stroke	(Japan) Toru Taniguchi
9	26 Sep 2010	Asia-Pacific Panasonic Open^{1}	−6 (71-70-66=207) (Note: Shortened to 54 holes due to weather.)	1 stroke	(Japan) Ryuichi Oda
10	1 May 2011	The Crowns	−9 (67-66-68-70=271)	Playoff	(South Korea) Jang Ik-jae
11	15 Apr 2012	Token Homemate Cup	−15 (68-69-70-62=269)	2 strokes	(Japan) Ryuichi Oda
12	29 Jul 2012	Sun Chlorella Classic (2)	−15 (69-66-68-70=273)	2 strokes	(South Korea) Lee Seong-ho, (Japan) Hideki Matsuyama, (Japan) Yoshinobu Tsukada
13	30 Jun 2013	Gateway to The Open Mizuno Open (2)	−19 (67-66-68-68=269)	3 strokes	(South Korea) Kim Kyung-tae
14	18 Sep 2016	ANA Open	−18 (66-67-67-70=270)	1 stroke	(Japan) Yuta Ikeda
15	21 Apr 2019	Token Homemate Cup	−15 (65-69-71-64=269)	1 stroke	(Australia) Matthew Griffin

^{1}Co-sanctioned by the Asian Tour

Japan Golf Tour playoff record (3–2)

No.	Year	Tournament	Opponent(s)	Result
1	2002	Sun Chlorella Classic	(Japan) Naomichi Ozaki, (United States) Christian Peña	Peña won with birdie on first extra hole
2	2003	Sun Chlorella Classic	(Japan) Daisuke Maruyama, (Japan) Taichi Teshima	Won with birdie on first extra hole
3	2004	Gateway to The Open Mizuno Open	(Japan) Hiroaki Iijima	Won with par on second extra hole
4	2009	Mitsubishi Diamond Cup Golf	(Japan) Takashi Kanemoto	Lost to birdie on third extra hole
5	2011	The Crowns	(South Korea) Jang Ik-jae	Won with birdie on first extra hole

=== Asian Tour wins (2) ===
No.	Date	Tournament	Winning score	Margin of victory	Runner(s)-up
1	26 Sep 2010	Asia-Pacific Panasonic Open^{1}	−6 (71-70-66=207)	1 stroke	(Japan) Ryuichi Oda
2	5 Mar 2023	New Zealand Open^{2}	−18 (69-69-62-66=266)	3 strokes	(New Zealand) Ben Campbell, (South Korea) Eom Jae-woong, (Japan) Tomoyo Ikemura, (Australia) John Lyras

^{1}Co-sanctioned by the Japan Golf Tour
^{2}Co-sanctioned by the PGA Tour of Australasia

=== PGA Tour of Australasia wins (1) ===
No.	Date	Tournament	Winning score	Margin of victory	Runners-up
1	5 Mar 2023	New Zealand Open^{1}	−18 (69-69-62-66=266)	3 strokes	(New Zealand) Ben Campbell, (South Korea) Eom Jae-woong, (Japan) Tomoyo Ikemura, (Australia) John Lyras

^{1}Co-sanctioned by the Asian Tour

PGA Tour of Australasia playoff record (0–1)

No.	Year	Tournament	Opponent	Result
1	2022	TPS Sydney	(Australia) Jarryd Felton	Lost to birdie on first extra hole

=== Nationwide Tour wins (1) ===
No.	Date	Tournament	Winning score	Margin of victory	Runner-up
1	13 Jun 2004	LaSalle Bank Open	−16 (67-70-64-67=268)	1 stroke	(United States) D. A. Points

Nationwide Tour playoff record (0–1)

No.	Year	Tournament	Opponents	Result
1	2004	SAS Carolina Classic	(United States) Chris Anderson, (United States) Jason Buha, (Australia) Paul Gow	Anderson won with par on eighth extra hole Buha and Gow eliminated by birdie on first hole

=== Other wins (2) ===
- 1999 Tasmanian Open
- 2007 Murrumbidgee Country Club Pro-Am

=== PGA of Australia Legends Tour wins (1) ===
- 2025 The Australian Golf Club Legends Pro-Am (with Jason Norris)

== Results in major championships ==
Tournament	2004	2005	2006	2007	2008	2009
Masters Tournament						
U.S. Open	CUT					
The Open Championship	CUT				T70	
PGA Championship	CUT				CUT	T24

Tournament	2010	2011	2012	2013	2014	2015	2016	2017	2018
Masters Tournament									
U.S. Open			CUT						
The Open Championship			T72	CUT					
PGA Championship		CUT	CUT						

Tournament	2019
Masters Tournament	
PGA Championship	CUT
U.S. Open	
The Open Championship	

Did not play

CUT = missed the half-way cut
"T" = tied

== Results in World Golf Championships ==
Tournament	2008	2009	2010	2011	2012
Match Play	R64	R64		R64	
Championship	T40				
Invitational	T36				
Champions			T25		T46

Did not play

QF, R16, R32, R64 = Round in which player lost in match play
"T" = Tied
Note that the HSBC Champions did not become a WGC event until 2009.

== Team appearances ==
Amateur

- Eisenhower Trophy (representing Australia): 1998
- Four Nations: 1994, 1995, 1996, 1997, 1998, 1999
- Australian Men's Interstate Teams Matches (representing New South Wales): 1993, 1994, 1995 (winners), 1996 (winners), 1997, 1998 (winners)

Professional

- World Cup (representing Australia): 2008, 2011

== See also ==
- 2004 Nationwide Tour graduates
- List of golfers with most Japan Golf Tour wins
