= Shingo Katayama =

Japanese professional golfer (1973)

Shingo Katayama 片山 晋呉
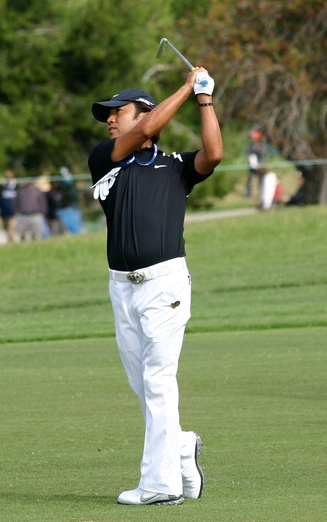

Personal information
- Full name: Shingo Katayama 片山 晋呉
- Nationality: Japan
- Born: 31 January 1973 (age 53) Chikusei, Ibaraki Prefecture
- Height: 5 ft 6 in (1.68 m)
- Weight: 161 lb (73 kg)

Career
- Sport: Golf
- Turned professional: 1995
- Current tours: Japan Golf Tour; Japan PGA Senior Tour
- Professional wins: 36
- Highest ranking: 23 (16 December 2007)

Number of wins by tour
- Japan Golf Tour: 31 (5th all-time)
- Other: 5

Best results in major championships
- Masters Tournament: 4th: 2009
- PGA Championship: T4: 2001
- U.S. Open: T35: 2002
- The Open Championship: T34: 2003

Achievements and awards
- Japan Golf Tour money list winner: 2000, 2004, 2005, 2006, 2008
- Japan Golf Tour Most Valuable Player: 2000, 2005, 2006, 2008

Shingo Katayama (Japanese: 片山 晋呉, born 31 January 1973) is a Japanese golfer.

== Career ==
Katayama was born in Chikusei, Ibaraki Prefecture. He turned professional in 1995 and has played full-time on the Japan Golf Tour since 1997. He topped the Japan Golf Tour money list five times: 2000, 2004, 2005, 2006, and 2008. He has won 31 tournaments on the Japan Golf Tour, ranking fifth on the career wins list and ranking second on the career money list with over ¥2,000,000,000.

Katayama has played in several major championships and World Golf Championships events, and his most notable achievement outside Japan is his tied fourth-place finish at the 2001 PGA Championship. He played the 3rd round with the champion David Toms. He was called "Cowboy Shingo" due to his distinctive cowboy-style hat. Placing fourth with a 10-under par at the 2009 Masters, he tied Toshimitsu Izawa (2001) for the best showing of a Japanese golfer at the tournament.

Katayama also featured in the top thirty of the Official World Golf Ranking, reaching a highest ranking of 23rd in December 2007.

Katayama rarely played on the U.S. based PGA Tour, playing the majority of his golf in Japan. His best finish outside of Japan, (excluding majors) came in 2006 at the WGC-Accenture Match Play Championship where he defeated Colin Montgomerie, 3 and 2, in the second round en route to finishing T9.

== Professional wins (36) ==
=== Japan Golf Tour wins (31) ===
Legend
Flagship events (2)
Japan majors (7) (Note: The 2005 and 2008 Japan Open Golf Championships were also Japan major championships.)
Other Japan Golf Tour (24)

No.	Date	Tournament	Winning score	Margin of victory	Runner(s)-up
1	9 Aug 1998	Sanko Grand Summer Championship	−14 (67-66-68-73=274)	Playoff	(Japan) Kazuhiko Hosokawa
2	6 Jun 1999	JCB Classic Sendai	−16 (69-63-69-67=268)	Playoff	(Japan) Shigemasa Higaki
3	23 Apr 2000	Asia Pacific Open Golf Championship Kirin Open	−4 (70-70-70-70=280)	2 strokes	(Taiwan) Lin Keng-chi, (Australia) Peter Senior, (Australia) Andre Stolz
4	21 May 2000	Munsingwear Open KSB Cup	−16 (68-65-66-73=272)	1 stroke	(Japan) Nobuhito Sato
5	19 Nov 2000	Dunlop Phoenix Tournament	−19 (65-66-66-68=265)	4 strokes	(United States) Bob May
6	3 Dec 2000	Golf Nippon Series JT Cup	−9 (69-67-67-68=271)	3 strokes	(Japan) Hirofumi Miyase
7	10 Dec 2000	Fancl Open in Okinawa	−11 (66-69-69-73=277)	2 strokes	(Japan) Toru Taniguchi
8	11 Mar 2001	Token Corporation Cup	−8 (69-63-73=205) (Note: Shortened to 54 holes due to weather.)	2 strokes	(Japan) Tsuneyuki Nakajima
9	22 Apr 2001	Asia Pacific Open Golf Championship Kirin Open (2)	−13 (64-70-70-67=271)	6 strokes	(Japan) Hajime Meshiai
10	9 Sep 2001	Suntory Open	−16 (66-68-68-66=268)	3 strokes	(Northern Ireland) Darren Clarke, (Japan) Keiichiro Fukabori, (Japan) Nobuo Serizawa
11	15 Sep 2002	Suntory Open (2)	−15 (68-68-68-65=269)	4 strokes	(Japan) Kōki Idoki, (Japan) Yasuharu Imano
12	8 Dec 2002	Golf Nippon Series JT Cup (2)	−19 (62-66-66-67=261)	9 strokes	(New Zealand) David Smail
13	18 May 2003	Japan PGA Championship	−17 (71-66-66-68=271)	1 stroke	(South Korea) Hur Suk-ho
14	2 Nov 2003	ABC Championship	−23 (64-69-68-64=265)	9 strokes	(Japan) Katsumasa Miyamoto
15	2 May 2004	The Crowns	−16 (65-64-63-72=264)	2 strokes	(Australia) Paul Sheehan
16	11 Jul 2004	Woodone Open Hiroshima	−22 (70-63-70-63=266)	5 strokes	(Japan) Ryuichi Oda
17	16 Oct 2005	Japan Open Golf Championship	−2 (71-73-70-68=282)	2 strokes	(Japan) Ryoken Kawagishi, (Australia) Craig Parry
18	30 Oct 2005	ABC Championship (2)	−14 (70-65-70-69=274)	2 strokes	(Fiji) Dinesh Chand
19	30 Apr 2006	The Crowns (2)	−18 (63-67-62-70=262)	2 strokes	(Japan) Nozomi Kawahara
20	3 Sep 2006	Fujisankei Classic	−10 (66-71-68-69=274)	3 strokes	(China) Liang Wenchong
21	29 Oct 2006	ABC Championship (3)	−17 (71-70-68-62=271)	Playoff	(South Korea) Yang Yong-eun
22	1 Jul 2007	UBS Japan Golf Tour Championship ShishidoHills	−9 (69-68-67-67=271)	1 stroke	(Japan) Naoya Takemoto
23	21 Oct 2007	Bridgestone Open	−18 (68-67-67-68=270)	1 stroke	(Australia) Steven Conran, (Japan) Keiichiro Fukabori, (Japan) Tomohiro Kondo
24	18 May 2008	Japan PGA Championship (2)	−23 (67-66-65-67=265)	6 strokes	(China) Liang Wenchong
25	19 Oct 2008	Japan Open Golf Championship (2)	−1 (68-72-72-71=283)	4 strokes	(Japan) Ryo Ishikawa
26	16 Nov 2008	Mitsui Sumitomo Visa Taiheiyo Masters	−16 (67-68-68-69=272)	Playoff	(Japan) Yasuharu Imano
27	6 Oct 2013	Coca-Cola Tokai Classic	−7 (74-76-64-67=281)	Playoff	(Japan) Hidemasa Hoshino, (Japan) Satoshi Tomiyama
28	30 Nov 2014	Casio World Open	−17 (70-64-72-65=271)	3 strokes	(Japan) Satoshi Tomiyama
29	15 Nov 2015	Mitsui Sumitomo Visa Taiheiyo Masters (2)	−14 (64-68-70=202)	1 stroke	(Thailand) Thanyakon Khrongpha
30	30 Oct 2016	Mynavi ABC Championship (4)	−12 (67-68-73-68=276)	1 stroke	(Japan) Shintaro Kobayashi
31	10 Sep 2017	ISPS Handa Match Play	3 and 2		(South Korea) Ryu Hyun-woo

Japan Golf Tour playoff record (5–3)

No.	Year	Tournament	Opponent(s)	Result
1	1998	Sanko Grand Summer Championship	(Japan) Kazuhiko Hosokawa	Won with par on third extra hole
2	1999	JCB Classic Sendai	(Japan) Shigemasa Higaki	Won with birdie on third extra hole
3	2002	Japan PGA Championship	(Japan) Kenichi Kuboya	Lost to birdie on second extra hole
4	2006	ABC Championship	(South Korea) Yang Yong-eun	Won with birdie on second extra hole
5	2008	Mitsui Sumitomo Visa Taiheiyo Masters	(Japan) Yasuharu Imano	Won with birdie on first extra hole
6	2012	Coca-Cola Tokai Classic	(South Korea) Ryu Hyun-woo	Lost to par on first extra hole
7	2013	Coca-Cola Tokai Classic	(Japan) Hidemasa Hoshino, (Japan) Satoshi Tomiyama	Won with birdie on first extra hole
8	2015	Top Cup Tokai Classic	(South Korea) Kim Hyung-sung	Lost to birdie on second extra hole

=== Japan Challenge Tour wins (2) ===
- 1993 Mito Green Open (as an amateur)
- 1995 Korakuen Cup (5th)

=== Other wins (1) ===
- 2016 Legend Charity Pro-Am

=== Japan PGA Senior Tour wins (2) ===
No.	Date	Tournament	Winning score	Margin of victory	Runner-up
1	1 Jun 2024	Sumaida Cup Senior Golf Tournament	−15 (68-64-69=201)	1 stroke	(Thailand) Thaworn Wiratchant
2	30 Mar 2025	Unitex Senior Open	−7 (67-68=135)	2 strokes	(Japan) Kenichi Kuboya, (New Zealand) David Smail

== Results in major championships ==
Tournament	1999	2000	2001	2002	2003	2004	2005	2006	2007	2008	2009
Masters Tournament			T40	CUT	T37		T33	T27	T44	CUT	4
U.S. Open			CUT	T35			CUT	CUT	T36	CUT	
The Open Championship	71	CUT	CUT	T50	T34			CUT			
PGA Championship		CUT	T4	CUT	CUT	T62	T23		T50		CUT

Tournament	2010	2011	2012	2013
Masters Tournament	CUT			
U.S. Open				
The Open Championship				T44
PGA Championship				

Top 10
Did not play

CUT = missed the half-way cut
"T" = tied

=== Summary ===
Tournament	Wins	2nd	3rd	Top-5	Top-10	Top-25	Events	Cuts made
Masters Tournament	0	0	0	1	1	1	9	6
U.S. Open	0	0	0	0	0	0	6	2
The Open Championship	0	0	0	0	0	0	7	4
PGA Championship	0	0	0	1	1	2	8	4
Totals	0	0	0	2	2	3	30	16

- Most consecutive cuts made – 3 (2007 Masters – 2007 PGA)
- Longest streak of top-10s – 1 (twice times)

== Results in The Players Championship ==
Tournament	2002	2003	2004	2005	2006
The Players Championship	CUT				T70

Did not play

CUT = missed the halfway cut
"T" indicates a tie for a place

== Results in World Golf Championships ==
Tournament	2002	2003	2004	2005	2006	2007	2008	2009
Championship			67			72	T73	T46
Match Play	R64	R64	R64	R64	R16	R64	R64	R32
Invitational						T46		72
Champions								T33

Top 10
Did not play

QF, R16, R32, R64 = Round in which player lost in match play
"T" = tied
Note that the HSBC Champions did not become a WGC event until 2009.

== Team appearances ==
Amateur

- Eisenhower Trophy (representing Japan): 1994

Professional

- Dynasty Cup (representing Japan): 2005
- EurAsia Cup (representing Asia): 2016

== See also ==
- List of golfers with most Japan Golf Tour wins
