= Hisayuki Sasaki =

Japanese professional golfer

Personal information
- Nationality: Japan
- Born: 27 November 1964 Tokyo, Japan
- Died: 3 January 2013 (aged 48) Bangkok, Thailand
- Height: 1.85 m (6 ft 1 in)
- Weight: 84 kg (185 lb; 13.2 st)

Career
- Sport: Golf
- Turned professional: 1986
- Former tours: Japan Golf Tour; PGA Tour
- Professional wins: 9
- Highest ranking: 77 (30 March 1997)

Number of wins by tour
- Japan Golf Tour: 3
- Other: 6

Best results in major championships
- Masters Tournament: DNP
- PGA Championship: DNP
- U.S. Open: DNP
- The Open Championship: T31: 1995

Hisayuki Sasaki (27 November 1964 – 3 January 2013) was a Japanese professional golfer.

== Professional career ==
Sasaki won three tournaments on the Japan Golf Tour and featured in the top 100 of the Official World Golf Ranking.

Sasaki tied Davis Love III for the individual trophy of the 1995 World Cup of Golf but lost on the fifth hole of a sudden-death playoff.

Sasaki played on the PGA Tour in 1996. He only recorded three top-25 finishes, however, and failed to maintain playing rights. He finished third in the 1997 Andersen Consulting World Championship of Golf.

== Professional wins (9) ==
=== Japan Golf Tour wins (3) ===
No.	Date	Tournament	Winning score	Margin of victory	Runner-up
1	4 Dec 1994	Golf Nippon Series Hitachi Cup	−14 (68-66-70-66=274)	1 stroke	(Japan) Naomichi Ozaki
2	14 May 1995	Japan PGA Championship	−16 (71-70-68-63=272)	4 strokes	(Japan) Kazuhiro Takami
3	23 Mar 1997	Dydo Drinco Shizuoka Open	−14 (71-67-68-68=274)	3 strokes	(Paraguay) Carlos Franco

Japan Golf Tour playoff record (0–2)

No.	Year	Tournament	Opponent(s)	Result
1	1994	Suntory Open	(United States) David Ishii	Lost to par on first extra hole
2	2003	Tsuruya Open	(Japan) Takashi Kanemoto, (Japan) Hirofumi Miyase	Miyase won with par on first extra hole

=== Japan Challenge Tour wins (3) ===
- 1991 Kanto Kokusai Open
- 1992 Kanto Kokusai Open, Korakuen Cup (2nd)

=== Other wins (3) ===
- 1994 Kanto Open
- 1999 Kanto Open
- 2002 Hokkaido Open

== Results in major championships ==
Tournament	1995
The Open Championship	T31

"T" = Tied
Note: Sasaki only played in The Open Championship.

== Team appearances ==
- World Cup (representing Japan): 1995

== See also ==
- 1995 PGA Tour Qualifying School graduates
