= Lee Dong-hwan (golfer) =

South Korean golfer

Personal information
- Nationality: South Korea
- Born: 9 April 1987 (age 39) Seoul, South Korea
- Height: 1.78 m (5 ft 10 in)
- Weight: 75 kg (165 lb; 11.8 st)

Career
- Sport: Golf
- Turned professional: 2005
- Current tour: Korean Tour
- Former tours: PGA Tour; Japan Golf Tour; Korn Ferry Tour; Japan Challenge Tour
- Professional wins: 4

Number of wins by tour
- Japan Golf Tour: 2
- Korn Ferry Tour: 1
- Other: 1

Best results in major championships
- Masters Tournament: DNP
- PGA Championship: DNP
- U.S. Open: CUT: 2012
- The Open Championship: CUT: 2007

Achievements and awards
- Japan Golf Tour Rookie of the Year: 2006

Lee Dong-hwan (Korean: 이동환; born 9 April 1987), also known as D. H. Lee, is a South Korean professional golfer.

== Career ==
Lee has predominantly played on the Japan Golf Tour where he has won twice; the Gateway to The Open Mizuno Open Yomiuri Classic in 2007 and the Toshin Golf Tournament in LakeWood in 2011. He was also named rookie of the year in 2006.

Lee was a medalist at the PGA Tour Qualifying Tournament in December 2012 and played on the PGA Tour in 2013. His best finish came at the AT&T National in June, where finished tied-for-third.

In 2017, Lee claimed his first Web.com Tour win at the United Leasing & Finance Championship. He shot a final round 74 to beat Jason Gore by one shot. With three top-25 finishes in the 2017 season, Lee finished 20th on the Regular Season money list.

== Awards and honors ==
In 2006, Lee earned Rookie of the Year honors on the Japan Golf Tour.

== Professional wins (4) ==
=== Japan Golf Tour wins (2) ===
No.	Date	Tournament	Winning score	Margin of victory	Runner(s)-up
1	24 Jun 2007	Gateway to The Open Mizuno Open Yomiuri Classic	−12 (68-68-68=204) (Note: Shortened to 54 holes due to weather.)	4 strokes	(South Korea) Lee Seong-ho, (Taiwan) Lin Keng-chi, (Japan) Toshinori Muto, (Japan) Achi Sato, (Japan) Hideto Tanihara, (Japan) Masaya Tomida
2	11 Sep 2011	Toshin Golf Tournament	−20 (65-67-67-69=268)	4 strokes	(Japan) Taigen Tsumagari

Japan Golf Tour playoff record (0–1)

No.	Year	Tournament	Opponent	Result
1	2007	ABC Championship	(Philippines) Frankie Miñoza	Lost to birdie on first extra hole

=== Web.com Tour wins (1) ===
No.	Date	Tournament	Winning score	Margin of victory	Runner-up
1	23 Apr 2017	United Leasing & Finance Championship	−6 (70-71-67-74=282)	1 stroke	(United States) Jason Gore

=== Japan Challenge Tour wins (1) ===
No.	Date	Tournament	Winning score	Margin of victory	Runner-up
1	23 Jun 2006	PGA JGTO Challenge II	−12 (63-69=132)	2 strokes	(Japan) Tomonori Takahashi

== Results in major championships ==
Tournament	2007	2008	2009	2010	2011	2012
U.S. Open						CUT
The Open Championship	CUT					

Did not play

CUT = missed the half-way cut
Note: Lee never played in the Masters Tournament or the PGA Championship.

== Results in The Players Championship ==
Tournament	2014
The Players Championship	WD

WD = withdrew

== Team appearances ==
Amateur

- Bonallack Trophy (representing Asia/Pacific): 2004 (winners)

== See also ==
- 2012 PGA Tour Qualifying School graduates
- 2015 Web.com Tour Finals graduates
