= Mitsutaka Kusakabe =

Japanese professional golfer

Personal information
- Nationality: Japan
- Born: 10 November 1968 (age 57) Kanagawa Prefecture, Japan
- Height: 1.73 m (5 ft 8 in)
- Weight: 76 kg (168 lb; 12.0 st)

Career
- Sport: Golf
- Status: Professional
- Former tour: Japan Golf Tour
- Professional wins: 3

Number of wins by tour
- Japan Golf Tour: 3

Mitsutaka Kusakabe (born 10 November 1968) is a Japanese professional golfer.

== Career ==
Kusakabe played on the Japan Golf Tour, winning three times.

== Professional wins (3) ==
=== PGA of Japan Tour wins (3) ===
No.	Date	Tournament	Winning score	Margin of victory	Runner(s)-up
1	21 May 1995	Pepsi Ube Kosan Open	−10 (70-70-66=206)	3 strokes	(Japan) Harumitsu Hamano, (Japan) Kōki Idoki, (Australia) Roger Mackay, (Japan) Katsunari Takahashi
2	30 Nov 1997	Casio World Open	−10 (69-68-71-70=278)	3 strokes	(Japan) Keiichiro Fukabori, (Japan) Hirofumi Miyase, (Japan) Naomichi Ozaki
3	18 Oct 1998	Nikkei Cup Torakichi Nakamura Memorial	−8 (75-68-68-69=280)	1 stroke	(Japan) Masashi Ozaki

== Team appearances ==
- World Cup (representing Japan): 1998
