= 2006 Japan Golf Tour =

Golf tour season

2006 Japan Golf Tour season
- Duration: 15 December 2005 – 3 December 2006
- Number of official events: 29
- Most wins: (Japan) Shingo Katayama (3)
- Money list: (Japan) Shingo Katayama
- Most Valuable Player: (Japan) Shingo Katayama
- Rookie of the Year: (South Korea) Lee Dong-hwan

The 2006 Japan Golf Tour was the 34th season of the Japan Golf Tour (formerly the PGA of Japan Tour), the main professional golf tour in Japan since it was formed in 1973.

== Schedule ==
The following table lists official events during the 2006 season.

| Date | Tournament | Location | Purse (¥) | Winner (Note: The number in brackets after each winner's name is the number of Japan Golf Tour events they had won up to and including that tournament. This information is only shown for Japan Golf Tour members.) | OWGR points | Other tours (Note: ASA − Asian Tour.) | Notes |
|---|---|---|---|---|---|---|---|
| 18 Dec | Asia Japan Okinawa Open | Okinawa | 100,000,000 | (Japan) Tadahiro Takayama (2) | 14 | ASA | |
| 16 Apr | Token Homemate Cup | Gifu | 110,000,000 | (Australia) Wayne Perske (1) | 16 | | |
| 23 Apr | Tsuruya Open | Hyōgo | 100,000,000 | (Australia) Brendan Jones (5) | 16 | | |
| 30 Apr | The Crowns | Aichi | 120,000,000 | (Japan) Shingo Katayama (19) | 16 | | |
| 14 May | Japan PGA Championship | Gifu | 110,000,000 | (Japan) Tomohiro Kondo (1) | 16 | | Japan major |
| 21 May | Munsingwear Open KSB Cup | Okayama | 100,000,000 | (Japan) Toshinori Muto (1) | 16 | | |
| 28 May | Mitsubishi Diamond Cup Golf | Saitama | 110,000,000 | (Japan) Kaname Yokoo (5) | 16 | | |
| 4 Jun | JCB Classic Sendai | Miyagi | 100,000,000 | (Japan) Hideto Tanihara (3) | 16 | | |
| 18 Jun | Mandom Lucido Yomiuri Open | Hyōgo | 100,000,000 | (Japan) Nobuhiro Masuda (1) | 16 | | |
| 25 Jun | Gateway to The Open Mizuno Open | Okayama | 100,000,000 | (South Korea) Hur Suk-ho (6) | 16 | | |
| 2 Jul | UBS Japan Golf Tour Championship ShishidoHills | Ibaraki | 150,000,000 | (Japan) Tatsuhiko Takahashi (2) | 16 | | Japan major |
| 9 Jul | Woodone Open Hiroshima | Hiroshima | 100,000,000 | (Japan) Tetsuji Hiratsuka (3) | 16 | | |
| 23 Jul | Sega Sammy Cup | Hokkaidō | 120,000,000 | (Taiwan) Yeh Wei-tze (2) | 16 | | |
| 30 Jul | The Golf Tournament in Omaezaki | Shizuoka | 120,000,000 | (Japan) Toru Taniguchi (11) | 16 | | |
| 6 Aug | Sun Chlorella Classic | Hokkaidō | 150,000,000 | (Japan) Hideto Tanihara (4) | 16 | | |
| 27 Aug | Under Armour KBC Augusta | Fukuoka | 100,000,000 | (Japan) Taichi Teshima (4) | 16 | | |
| 3 Sep | Fujisankei Classic | Yamanashi | 150,000,000 | (Japan) Shingo Katayama (20) | 16 | | |
| 10 Sep | Suntory Open | Chiba | 100,000,000 | (South Korea) Yang Yong-eun (4) | 16 | | |
| 17 Sep | ANA Open | Hokkaidō | 100,000,000 | (Japan) Tomohiro Kondo (2) | 16 | | |
| 24 Sep | Acom International | Ibaraki | 120,000,000 | (Japan) Mamo Osanai (3) | 16 | | |
| 1 Oct | Coca-Cola Tokai Classic | Aichi | 120,000,000 | (Japan) Hidemasa Hoshino (2) | 16 | | |
| 15 Oct | Japan Open Golf Championship | Saitama | 200,000,000 | (Australia) Paul Sheehan (3) | 32 | | Flagship event (Note: Also a Japan major championship.) |
| 22 Oct | Bridgestone Open | Chiba | 110,000,000 | (Japan) Taichi Teshima (5) | 16 | | |
| 29 Oct | ABC Championship | Hyōgo | 120,000,000 | (Japan) Shingo Katayama (21) | 16 | | |
| 5 Nov | Asahi-Ryokuken Yomiuri Memorial | Fukuoka | 100,000,000 | (Japan) Tatsuhiko Ichihara (1) | 16 | | |
| 12 Nov | Mitsui Sumitomo Visa Taiheiyo Masters | Shizuoka | 150,000,000 | (Japan) Tsuneyuki Nakajima (48) | 24 | | |
| 19 Nov | Dunlop Phoenix Tournament | Miyazaki | 200,000,000 | (Republic of Ireland) Pádraig Harrington (n/a) | 38 | | |
| 26 Nov | Casio World Open | Kōchi | 140,000,000 | (India) Jeev Milkha Singh (1) | 18 | | |
| 3 Dec | Golf Nippon Series JT Cup | Tokyo | 100,000,000 | (India) Jeev Milkha Singh (2) | 20 | | Japan major |

=== Unofficial events ===
The following events were sanctioned by the Japan Golf Tour, but did not carry official money, nor were wins official.

| Date | Tournament | Location | Purse | Winner | OWGR points | Other tours | Notes |
|---|---|---|---|---|---|---|---|
| 9 Apr | Masters Tournament | United States | US$7,000,000 | (United States) Phil Mickelson | 100 | | Major championship |
| 18 Jun | U.S. Open | United States | US$6,250,000 | (Australia) Geoff Ogilvy | 100 | | Major championship |
| 23 Jul | The Open Championship | England | £4,000,000 | (United States) Tiger Woods | 100 | | Major championship |
| 20 Aug | PGA Championship | United States | US$6,800,000 | (United States) Tiger Woods | 100 | | Major championship |

== Money list ==
The money list was based on prize money won during the season, calculated in Japanese yen.

| Position | Player | Prize money (¥) |
|---|---|---|
| 1 | (Japan) Shingo Katayama | 178,402,190 |
| 2 | (Japan) Hideto Tanihara | 119,888,517 |
| 3 | (India) Jeev Milkha Singh | 113,538,173 |
| 4 | (Japan) Toru Taniguchi | 113,468,445 |
| 5 | (Japan) Taichi Teshima | 96,488,270 |

== Awards ==
| Award | Winner | Ref. |
|---|---|---|
| Most Valuable Player | (Japan) Shingo Katayama | |
| Rookie of the Year (Shimada Trophy) | (South Korea) Lee Dong-hwan | |

== Japan Challenge Tour ==
2006 Japan Challenge Tour season
- Duration: 6 April 2006 – 19 October 2006
- Number of official events: 16
- Most wins: (Japan) Yosuke Mizobuchi (2) (Japan) Keishiro Nakata (2) (Japan) Takaki Ono (2)
- Money list: (Japan) Takaki Ono

The 2006 Japan Challenge Tour was the 22nd season of the Japan Challenge Tour, the official development tour to the Japan Golf Tour.

=== Schedule ===
The following table lists official events during the 2006 season.

| Date | Tournament | Location | Purse (¥) | Winner (Note: The number in brackets after each winner's name is the number of Japan Challenge Tour events they had won up to and including that tournament. It is rare for someone to accumulate many wins on the Japan Challenge Tour as success at this level usually leads to promotion to the Japan Golf Tour.) |
|---|---|---|---|---|
| 8 Apr | PRGR Cup | Chiba | 15,000,000 | (Japan) Hirotoshi Shigehara (1) |
| 19 May | Everlife Cup Challenge Tournament | Fukuoka | 10,000,000 | (Japan) Takaki Ono (1) |
| 2 Jun | PGA JGTO Challenge I | Yamaguchi | 10,000,000 | (Japan) Tatsuaki Nakamura (2) |
| 9 Jun | Kanitop Cup Challenge Tournament I | Miyagi | 15,000,000 | (Japan) Yosuke Mizobuchi (1) |
| 16 Jun | Segasammy Challenge | Ibaraki | 10,000,000 | (Japan) Yosuke Mizobuchi (2) |
| 23 Jun | PGA JGTO Challenge II | Tochigi | 10,000,000 | (South Korea) Lee Dong-hwan (1) |
| 7 Jul | 1st PGM Series Country Club The Lakes Challenge | Ibaraki | 10,000,000 | (Japan) Shinichi Yamazaki (1) |
| 28 Jul | 2nd PGM Series Wakagi Challenge | Saga | 10,000,000 | (Japan) Taku Sugaya (2) |
| 9 Aug | 3rd PGM Series Sun-Park Sapporo Challenge | Hokkaido | 10,000,000 | (Japan) Seita Matsumoto (1) |
| 25 Aug | 4th PGM Series Ohinata Challenge | Tochigi | 10,000,000 | (Japan) Keishiro Nakata (1) |
| 8 Sep | 5th PGM Series Kasagi Challenge | Kyoto | 10,000,000 | (Japan) Keishiro Nakata (2) |
| 14 Sep | Srixon Challenge | Tochigi | 10,000,000 | (Japan) Takaki Ono (2) |
| 22 Sep | GDO Challenge Cup | Ibaraki | 10,000,000 | (Japan) Naruhito Ueda (1) |
| 30 Sep | Kanitop Cup Challenge Tournament II | Miyagi | 20,000,000 | (Japan) Kazuya Omae (1) |
| 6 Oct | Par 72 Challenge Cup | Tochigi | 10,000,000 | (Japan) Achi Sato (1) |
| 19 Oct | Tokyo Dome Cup | Tochigi | 10,000,000 | (Japan) Masamichi Uehira (2) |

=== Money list ===
The money list was based on prize money won during the season, calculated in Japanese yen. The top five players on the money list earned status to play on the 2007 Japan Golf Tour.

| Position | Player | Prize money (¥) |
|---|---|---|
| 1 | (Japan) Takaki Ono | 7,710,069 |
| 2 | (Japan) Yosuke Mizobuchi | 5,536,423 |
| 3 | (Japan) Hirotoshi Shigehara | 4,849,623 |
| 4 | (Japan) Toru Morita | 4,801,984 |
| 5 | (Japan) Tatsuaki Nakamura | 4,439,831 |
