= Heiwa PGM Championship =

Tournament information
- Location: Omitama, Ibaraki, Japan
- Established: 2013
- Course: Ishioka Golf Club
- Par: 70
- Length: 7,039 yards (6,436 m)
- Tour: Japan Golf Tour
- Format: Stroke play
- Prize fund: ¥150,000,000
- Month played: October
- Final year: 2022

Tournament record score
- Aggregate: 258 Rikuya Hoshino (2022)
- To par: −22 as above

Final champion
- (Japan) Rikuya Hoshino
- Location in Japan Location in the Ibaraki Prefecture

The Heiwa PGM Championship was a professional golf tournament on the Japan Golf Tour. It was played for the first time in November 2013 at the Miho Golf Club in Miho, Ibaraki, Japan.

== Winners ==
Year	Winner	Score	To par	Margin of victory	Runner(s)-up	Venue
2022	(Japan) Rikuya Hoshino	258	−22	5 strokes	(Japan) Aguri Iwasaki (United States) Chan Kim	Ishioka
2020–21: No tournament
2019	(South Korea) Choi Ho-sung	270	−14	2 strokes	(Japan) Shugo Imahira	PGM Resort Okinawa
2018	(South Africa) Shaun Norris	202 (Note: Shortened to 54 holes due to weather.)	−14	1 stroke	(Japan) Daisuke Kataoka	PGM Resort Okinawa
2017	(United States) Chan Kim	278	−6	1 stroke	(Japan) Yuta Ikeda (South Korea) Song Young-han	PGM Resort Okinawa
2016	(Japan) Hideto Tanihara (2)	268	−12	Playoff	(Japan) Yuta Ikeda	Sobu
2015	(Japan) Hideto Tanihara	269	−11	2 strokes	(Japan) Yoshinori Fujimoto	Sobu
2014	(Japan) Tomohiro Kondo	264	−20	4 strokes	(Japan) Yoshinori Fujimoto (South Korea) Ryu Hyun-woo (Japan) Hideto Tanihara	Miho
2013	(China) Wu Ashun	273	−11	1 stroke	(South Korea) Kim Hyung-sung	Miho
