= The Championship by Lexus =

Japanese professional golf tournament

Tournament information
- Location: Bandō, Ibaraki, Japan
- Established: 2008
- Course: Otone Country Club
- Par: 72
- Length: 7,044 yards (6,441 m)
- Tour: Japan Golf Tour
- Format: Stroke play
- Prize fund: ¥150,000,000
- Month played: July
- Final year: 2010

Tournament record score
- Aggregate: 268 Toshinori Muto (2009)
- To par: −18 Takashi Kanemoto (2010)

Final champion
- (Japan) Takashi Kanemoto
- Location in Japan Location in the Ibaraki Prefecture

The Championship by Lexus was a professional golf tournament on the Japan Golf Tour. It was played from 2008 to 2010. It was played at the Otone Country Club in Bandō, Ibaraki. The 2010 purse was ¥150,000,000 with ¥30,000,000 going to the winner. The main sponsor was Lexus.

== Winners ==
Year	Winner	Score	To par	Margin of victory	Runner-up	Purse (¥)	Winner's share (¥)
2010	(Japan) Takashi Kanemoto	270	−18	1 stroke	(Japan) Makoto Inoue	150,000,000	30,000,000
2009	(Japan) Toshinori Muto	268	−16	3 strokes	(South Korea) Kim Kyung-tae	150,000,000	30,000,000
2008	(South Korea) Hur Suk-ho	269	−15	5 strokes	(Japan) Kiyoshi Miyazato	200,000,000	40,000,000
