= Yuko Anai =

Japanese music artist

Yuko Anai 穴井 夕子
- Also known as: UL-SAYS
- Born: June 7, 1974 (age 52)
- Genres: J-pop
- Occupations: Singer, Host
- Instrument: Vocals
- Years active: 1991–2000
- Formerly of: Tokyo Performance Doll, Orange
- Spouse: Yokota Shinichi (m. 2000)

Yuko Anai (穴井 夕子, born 7 June 1974) is a female Japanese popular music artist. She started her career as a member of a group called Tokyo Performance Doll. As UL-SAYS, she sang the opening song Oh my Darin for Urusei Yatsura. The song was recorded around August 1991. Between August 1995 and March 1996, Yuko was hired by St.GIGA to host the SoundLink Magazine, "King of After School" (放課後の王様, Houkago no Ousama?), for the Nintendo Satellaview once a week. In September 1996, she formed the group Orange. In June 2000, she married professional golfer Yokota Shinichi.

== Discography ==
=== Singles ===
- 'WE SHOULD BE DANCING' (21 March 1991)
- 'NATURAL LOVERS' (21 September 1991)
- 'I Want You!' (22 July 1992)
- 'WILD CHILD' (2 February 1994)
- 'HEAVEN 2' (1 June 1994)
- 'STOP!' (7 September 1994)
- 'CRIME CRACKERS' (21 November 1994)
- 'Hallelujah!' (1 June 1995)
- 'Promises' (1 November 1995)
- 'LEGACY - Kimi no Ai wo Daite -' (1 March 1996)

=== Albums ===
- YUKO from Tokyo Performance Doll (15 January 1993)
- SIN (1 December 1994)
- BAD / but ENOUGH (21 April 1996)
