= Toru Taniguchi =

Japanese professional golfer

Toru Taniguchi 谷口 徹
Personal information
- Nationality: Japan
- Born: 10 February 1968 (age 58) Nara Prefecture, Japan
- Height: 1.69 m (5 ft 7 in)
- Weight: 72 kg (159 lb; 11.3 st)

Career
- Sport: Golf
- Turned professional: 1992
- Current tours: Japan Golf Tour; Japan PGA Senior Tour
- Professional wins: 22
- Highest ranking: 27 (16 December 2007)

Number of wins by tour
- Japan Golf Tour: 20 (Tied-9th all-time)
- Other: 2

Best results in major championships
- Masters Tournament: CUT: 2002, 2003, 2008
- PGA Championship: T68: 2012
- U.S. Open: T63: 2010
- The Open Championship: T37: 2001

Achievements and awards
- Japan Golf Tour money list winner: 2002, 2007
- Japan Golf Tour Most Valuable Player: 2002, 2004, 2007

Toru Taniguchi (谷口 徹, Taniguchi Tōru; born 10 February 1968) is a Japanese professional golfer born in Nara.

== Career ==
Taniguchi has won 20 tournaments on the Japan Golf Tour, ranking 10th on the most career victories list; topped the annual earnings list in 2002 and 2007; and is fourth on the career earnings list through 2018. In 2001 he placed 3rd in WGC-Accenture Match Play Championship.

He has been in the top 30 of the Official World Golf Ranking, and was the highest ranked Japanese golfer from 2007 to 2008.

== Professional wins (22) ==
=== Japan Golf Tour wins (20) ===
Legend
Flagship events (2)
Japan majors (5) (Note: The 2004 and 2007 Japan Open Golf Championships were also Japan major championships.)
Other Japan Golf Tour (15)

No.	Date	Tournament	Winning score	Margin of victory	Runner(s)-up
1	31 May 1998	Mitsubishi Galant Tournament	−16 (71-65-65-67=268)	1 stroke	(Japan) Kazuhiko Hosokawa
2	24 Sep 2000	Acom International	−18 (69-68-65-64=266)	6 strokes	(Japan) Yasuharu Imano
3	29 Oct 2000	Philip Morris Championship	−12 (68-73-68-67=276)	1 stroke	(Japan) Shingo Katayama, (Japan) Hidemichi Tanaka
4	17 Mar 2002	Token Corporation Cup	−16 (71-73-67-61=272)	2 strokes	(Japan) Hirofumi Miyase
5	23 Jun 2002	Tamanoi Yomiuri Open	−18 (65-69-67-69=270)	2 strokes	(Japan) Satoru Hirota, (Japan) Daisuke Maruyama
6	29 Sep 2002	Acom International (2)	−16 (64-63-70=197) (Note: Shortened to 54 holes due to weather.)	1 stroke	(China) Zhang Lianwei
7	13 Oct 2002	Georgia Tokai Classic	−10 (72-69-69-68=278)	2 strokes	(Japan) Nozomi Kawahara, (Myanmar) Zaw Moe
8	17 Oct 2004	Japan Open Golf Championship	−3 (68-68-75-74=285)	4 strokes	(Japan) Toshimitsu Izawa, (New Zealand) David Smail, (Taiwan) Yeh Wei-tze
9	24 Oct 2004	Bridgestone Open	−16 (66-71-69-66=272)	1 stroke	(Japan) Shigeki Maruyama, (Japan) Shinichi Yokota
10	27 Nov 2005	Casio World Open	−11 (70-70-68-69=277)	2 strokes	(South Korea) Kim Jong-duck
11	30 Jul 2006	The Golf Tournament in Omaezaki	−11 (69-70-66-68=273)	Playoff	(South Korea) Hur Suk-ho, (Japan) Tomohiro Kondo
12	8 Jul 2007	Woodone Open Hiroshima	−15 (67-64-68-70=269)	Playoff	(Thailand) Prayad Marksaeng
13	15 Jul 2007	Nagashima Shigeo Invitational Sega Sammy Cup	−12 (70-70-68-68=276)	3 strokes	(Thailand) Prom Meesawat
14	14 Oct 2007	Japan Open Golf Championship (2)	−5 (75-70-72-66=283)	2 strokes	(Japan) Shingo Katayama
15	20 Sep 2009	ANA Open	−16 (67-67-66-72=272)	4 strokes	(South Korea) Kim Kyung-tae, (Japan) Tsuneyuki Nakajima, (Japan) Kazuhiro Yamashita
16	16 May 2010	Japan PGA Championship Nissin Cupnoodles Cup	−10 (69-68-65-68=270)	1 stroke	(Japan) Tetsuji Hiratsuka
17	23 Oct 2011	Bridgestone Open (2)	−15 (69-67-68-65=269)	2 strokes	(Japan) Shingo Katayama, (Japan) Hiroo Kawai, (Japan) Michio Matsumura, (Japan) Koumei Oda
18	13 May 2012	Japan PGA Championship Nissin Cupnoodles Cup (2)	−4 (65-70-76-73=284)	1 stroke	(Japan) Keiichiro Fukabori
19	21 Oct 2012	Bridgestone Open (3)	−12 (66-71-69-66=272)	1 stroke	(Japan) Hiroyuki Fujita
20	13 May 2018	Japan PGA Championship (3)	−6 (68-72-71-71=282)	Playoff	(Japan) Yoshinori Fujimoto

Japan Golf Tour playoff record (3–4)

No.	Year	Tournament	Opponent(s)	Result
1	2000	Mitsubishi Motors Tournament	(Japan) Hirofumi Miyase	Lost to eagle on second extra hole
2	2006	The Golf Tournament in Omaezaki	(South Korea) Hur Suk-ho, (Japan) Tomohiro Kondo	Won with birdie on third extra hole Kondo eliminated by birdie on second hole
3	2007	The Crowns	(Japan) Hirofumi Miyase	Lost to par on first extra hole
4	2007	Woodone Open Hiroshima	(Thailand) Prayad Marksaeng	Won with birdie on first extra hole
5	2010	Tsuruya Open	(Japan) Hiroyuki Fujita	Lost to birdie on third extra hole
6	2011	Golf Nippon Series JT Cup	(Japan) Hiroyuki Fujita	Lost to par on second extra hole
7	2018	Japan PGA Championship	(Japan) Yoshinori Fujimoto	Won with birdie on first extra hole

=== Japan PGA Senior Tour wins (2) ===
No.	Date	Tournament	Winning score	Margin of victory	Runner(s)-up
1	22 Sep 2019	Japan Senior Open Golf Championship	−8 (66-70-72-72=280)	1 stroke	(Thailand) Thaworn Wiratchant
2	13 Jun 2021	Starts Senior Golf Tournament	−18 (65-67-66=198)	3 strokes	(Japan) Kazuhiko Hosokawa, (Thailand) Thaworn Wiratchant

== Results in major championships ==
Tournament	1998	1999
Masters Tournament		
U.S. Open		
The Open Championship	CUT	
PGA Championship		

Tournament	2000	2001	2002	2003	2004	2005	2006	2007	2008	2009
Masters Tournament			CUT	CUT					CUT	
U.S. Open		CUT		CUT		CUT	CUT	CUT	CUT	
The Open Championship		T37	T69	CUT		CUT		T60		
PGA Championship		CUT	CUT	CUT		CUT		CUT	CUT	

Tournament	2010	2011	2012	2013	2014	2015	2016
Masters Tournament							
U.S. Open	T63		CUT		67		CUT
The Open Championship	T60		CUT	CUT			
PGA Championship			T68				

Did not play

CUT = missed the half-way cut
"T" = tied

=== Summary ===
Tournament	Wins	2nd	3rd	Top-5	Top-10	Top-25	Events	Cuts made
Masters Tournament	0	0	0	0	0	0	3	0
U.S. Open	0	0	0	0	0	0	10	2
The Open Championship	0	0	0	0	0	0	9	4
PGA Championship	0	0	0	0	0	0	7	1
Totals	0	0	0	0	0	0	29	7

- Most consecutive cuts made – 2 (2010 U.S. Open – 2010 Open)
- Longest streak of top-10s – 0

== Results in World Golf Championships ==
Tournament	2001	2002	2003	2004	2005	2006	2007	2008	2009	2010	2011	2012	2013
Match Play	3	R64						R64					
Championship	NT^{1}					T59		T26					
Invitational												WD	71
Champions													

^{1}Cancelled due to 9/11

Top 10
Did not play

QF, R16, R32, R64 = Round in which player lost in match play
"T" = tied
NT = No Tournament
Note that the HSBC Champions did not become a WGC event until 2009.

== Team appearances ==
- Royal Trophy (representing Asia): 2007, 2009 (winners)
- World Cup (representing Japan): 2008

== See also ==
- List of golfers with most Japan Golf Tour wins
