= Toshikazu Sugihara =

Japanese professional golfer

Personal information
- Nationality: Japan
- Born: 8 April 1964 (age 62) Osaka Prefecture, Japan
- Height: 1.74 m (5 ft 9 in)
- Weight: 61 kg (134 lb; 9.6 st)

Career
- Sport: Golf
- Status: Professional
- Former tour: Japan Golf Tour
- Professional wins: 2

Number of wins by tour
- Japan Golf Tour: 1
- Other: 1

Toshikazu Sugihara (born 8 April 1964) is a Japanese professional golfer.

== Career ==
Sugihara played on the Japan Golf Tour, winning once.

== Professional wins (2) ==
=== PGA of Japan Tour wins (1) ===
| No. | Date | Tournament | Winning score | Margin of victory | Runner-up |
|---|---|---|---|---|---|
| 1 | 8 Sep 1991 | Kansai Open | −5 (72-70-69-72=283) | 1 stroke | (Japan) Teruo Sugihara |

=== Japan Challenge Tour wins (1) ===
| No. | Date | Tournament | Winning score | Margin of victory | Runners-up |
|---|---|---|---|---|---|
| 1 | 13 Sep 2007 | Srixon Challenge | −11 (69-64=133) | 2 strokes | (Japan) Masao Nakajima, (Japan) Tatsuya Sato |
