= Takashi Kamiyama =

Japanese professional golfer (born 1973)

Personal information
- Nationality: Japan
- Born: 22 March 1973 (age 53) Tokyo, Japan
- Height: 1.75 m (5 ft 9 in)
- Weight: 95 kg (209 lb; 15.0 st)

Career
- Sport: Golf
- College: Nihon University
- Turned professional: 1997
- Former tour: Japan Golf Tour
- Professional wins: 1

Number of wins by tour
- Japan Golf Tour: 1

Best results in major championships
- Masters Tournament: DNP
- PGA Championship: DNP
- U.S. Open: DNP
- The Open Championship: T27: 2004

Takashi Kamiyama (born 22 March 1973) is a Japanese professional golfer.

== Career ==
Kamiyama played on the Japan Golf Tour, winning once.

== Professional wins (1) ==
=== Japan Golf Tour wins (1) ===
No.	Date	Tournament	Winning score	Margin of victory	Runners-up
1	6 Jun 2004	JCB Classic Sendai	−13 (68-69-67-67=271)	Playoff	(Japan) Tomohiro Kondo, (Japan) Tsuneyuki Nakajima

Japan Golf Tour playoff record (1–0)

No.	Year	Tournament	Opponents	Result
1	2004	JCB Classic Sendai	(Japan) Tomohiro Kondo, (Japan) Tsuneyuki Nakajima	Won with birdie on first extra hole

== Results in major championships ==
Tournament	2004
The Open Championship	T27

Note: Kamiyama only played in The Open Championship.
"T" = tied

== Team appearances ==
- Dynasty Cup (representing Japan): 2005
