= David Oh (golfer) =

American golfer (born 1981)

Personal information
- Nationality: United States
- Born: March 28, 1981 (age 45) Los Angeles, California, U.S.
- Height: 1.79 m (5 ft 10 in)
- Weight: 78 kg (172 lb; 12.3 st)

Career
- Sport: Golf
- College: U. of Southern California
- Turned professional: 2004
- Current tours: Japan Golf Tour; OneAsia Tour
- Professional wins: 2

Number of wins by tour
- Japan Golf Tour: 1
- Other: 1

Best results in major championships
- Masters Tournament: DNP
- PGA Championship: DNP
- U.S. Open: CUT: 2005, 2006, 2014
- The Open Championship: DNP

David Oh (born March 28, 1981) is an American professional golfer.

== Career ==
Oh was born in Los Angeles, California. He played college golf at the University of Southern California from 1999 to 2003.

Oh has played on the Japan Golf Tour since 2012 and won his first tournament at the 2014 Mitsui Sumitomo Visa Taiheiyo Masters.

== Professional wins (2) ==
=== Japan Golf Tour wins (1) ===
No.	Date	Tournament	Winning score	Margin of victory	Runner-up
1	Nov 16, 2014	Mitsui Sumitomo Visa Taiheiyo Masters	−12 (70-68-68-70=276)	1 stroke	(Japan) Toshinori Muto

=== Other wins (1) ===
- 2003 Long Beach Open
