= Ryoken Kawagishi =

Japanese professional golfer

Ryoken Kawagishi 川岸良兼
Personal information
- Nationality: Japan
- Born: 6 December 1966 (age 59) Ishikawa Prefecture, Japan
- Height: 1.80 m (5 ft 11 in)
- Weight: 88 kg (194 lb; 13.9 st)

Career
- Sport: Golf
- Turned professional: 1989
- Current tour: Japan Golf Tour
- Professional wins: 6

Number of wins by tour
- Japan Golf Tour: 6

Best results in major championships
- Masters Tournament: DNP
- PGA Championship: CUT: 1991
- U.S. Open: DNP
- The Open Championship: T79: 1995

Ryoken Kawagishi (Japanese: 川岸良兼, born 6 December 1966) is a Japanese professional golfer.

== Career ==
Kawagishi was born in Ishikawa Prefecture.

As an amateur, he won two events in the United States in 1989, the Eastern Amateur and the Monroe Invitational.

Kawagishi joined the Japan Golf Tour in 1990, winning six times in his career. He was the rookie of the year in 1990, winning three times. He won again in 1991, 1995 and 1999.

== Amateur wins ==
- 1989 Eastern Amateur, Monroe Invitational

== Professional wins (6) ==
=== Japan Golf Tour wins (6) ===
No.	Date	Tournament	Winning score	Margin of victory	Runner-up
1	18 Mar 1990	Shizuoka Open	−8 (73-73-66-68=280)	2 strokes	(Japan) Hiroshi Makino
2	2 Sep 1990	Kanto Open	−7 (66-64-73-70=273)	2 strokes	(Japan) Isao Aoki
3	28 Oct 1990	ABC Lark Cup	−11 (72-68-69-68=277)	2 strokes	(Japan) Masashi Ozaki
4	14 Apr 1991	Pocari Sweat Open	−14 (67-66-66=199) (Note: Shortened to 54 holes due to weather.)	4 strokes	(Japan) Hiroshi Makino
5	4 Jun 1995	JCB Classic Sendai	−13 (71-68-64-68=271)	3 strokes	(Japan) Toru Suzuki
6	31 Oct 1999	Philip Morris Championship (2)	−18 (71-65-66-68=270)	1 stroke	(Japan) Katsunori Kuwabara

Japan Golf Tour playoff record (0–2)

No.	Year	Tournament	Opponent(s)	Result
1	1991	Gene Sarazen Jun Classic	(Japan) Masashi Ozaki	Lost to par on first extra hole
2	1999	Sumitomo Visa Taiheiyo Masters	(Northern Ireland) Darren Clarke, (Japan) Hirofumi Miyase	Miyase won with par on second extra hole Kawagishi eliminated by par on first hole

== Team appearances ==
Amateur

- Eisenhower Trophy (representing Japan): 1986, 1988

Professional

- Four Tours World Championship (representing Japan): 1991
- Dynasty Cup (representing Japan): 2005
