= Michio Matsumura =

Japanese professional golfer (born 1983)

Michio Matsumura 松村 道央
Personal information
- Nationality: Japan
- Born: 22 July 1983 (age 43) Saitama Prefecture, Japan
- Height: 1.72 m (5 ft 8 in)
- Weight: 67 kg (148 lb; 10.6 st)

Career
- Sport: Golf
- Turned professional: 2006
- Current tour: Japan Challenge Tour
- Former tour: Japan Golf Tour
- Professional wins: 8
- Highest ranking: 82 (19 December 2010)

Number of wins by tour
- Japan Golf Tour: 5
- Other: 3

Best results in major championships
- Masters Tournament: DNP
- PGA Championship: DNP
- U.S. Open: DNP
- The Open Championship: CUT: 2008

Achievements and awards
- Japan Challenge Tour money list winner: 2007

Michio Matsumura (松村 道央, Matsumura Michio; born 22 July 1983 in Saitama Prefecture) is a Japanese professional golfer.

== Career ==
Matsumura has won twice on the Japan Challenge Tour and five times on the Japan Golf Tour. He has been featured in the top 100 of the Official World Golf Ranking.

== Professional wins (8) ==
=== Japan Golf Tour wins (5) ===
No.	Date	Tournament	Winning score	Margin of victory	Runner(s)-up
1	3 Oct 2010	Coca-Cola Tokai Classic	−8 (72-68-72-68=280)	Playoff	(Japan) Hiroyuki Fujita, (Japan) Takashi Kanemoto
2	28 Nov 2010	Casio World Open	−13 (68-72-67-68=275)	Playoff	(South Korea) Kim Do-hoon
3	5 May 2013	The Crowns	−2 (71-71-69-67=278)	1 stroke	(Japan) Hideki Matsuyama
4	30 Mar 2014	Enjoy Jakarta Indonesia PGA Championship^{1}	−21 (65-67-67-68=267)	1 stroke	(Australia) Rhein Gibson, (Philippines) Juvic Pagunsan
5	25 Oct 2015	Bridgestone Open	−9 (69-68-71-67=275)	2 strokes	(Australia) Adam Bland, (Japan) Mikumu Horikawa, (Japan) Yuki Inamori, (South Korea) Kim Kyung-tae

^{1}Co-sanctioned by the OneAsia Tour

Japan Golf Tour playoff record (2–0)

No.	Year	Tournament	Opponent(s)	Result
1	2010	Coca-Cola Tokai Classic	(Japan) Hiroyuki Fujita, (Japan) Takashi Kanemoto	Won with par on third extra hole Kanemoto eliminated by par on first hole
2	2010	Casio World Open	(South Korea) Kim Do-hoon	Won with birdie on fourth extra hole

=== Japan Challenge Tour wins (3) ===
No.	Date	Tournament	Winning score	Margin of victory	Runner(s)-up
1	5 Oct 2007	Par 72 Challenge Cup	−14 (65-68-69=202)	1 stroke	(Japan) Katsunori Kuwabara, (Japan) Daisuke Uemori
2	21 Oct 2007	PRGR Cup Final	−14 (69-70-68-67=274)	2 strokes	(Japan) Kazuhiro Yamashita
3	23 Oct 2026	Japan Create Challenge	−9 (71-67-66=204)	1 stroke	(Japan) Koki Domeki, (Japan) Shotaro Tanaka

== Results in major championships ==
Tournament	2008
The Open Championship	CUT

CUT = missed the halfway cut
Note: Matsumura only played in The Open Championship.

== Results in World Golf Championships ==
Tournament	2010	2011	2012	2013	2014	2015	2016
Match Play							
Championship							
Invitational							T49
Champions	T60	T59					

Did not play

"T" = Tied
