= Tomohiro Kondo =

Japanese professional golfer

Tomohiro Kondo 近藤智弘
Personal information
- Nationality: Japan
- Born: 17 June 1977 (age 49) Tōkai, Aichi, Japan
- Height: 1.67 m (5 ft 6 in)
- Weight: 60 kg (132 lb; 9 st 6 lb)

Career
- Sport: Golf
- Turned professional: 2000
- Current tour: Japan Golf Tour
- Professional wins: 6
- Highest ranking: 88 (4 January 2015)

Number of wins by tour
- Japan Golf Tour: 6

Best results in major championships
- Masters Tournament: DNP
- PGA Championship: DNP
- U.S. Open: DNP
- The Open Championship: CUT: 2007, 2009, 2014
Medal record
Asian Games
Gold medal – first place	1998 Bangkok	Men's individual
Gold medal – first place	1998 Bangkok	Men's team

Tomohiro Kondo (Japanese: 近藤智弘, born 17 June 1977) is a Japanese professional golfer.

== Career ==
Kondo was born in Tōkai, Aichi, Japan. He won the gold medal at the 1998 Asian Games.

After turning professional, Kondo joined the Japan Golf Tour. He has six wins on the Japan Golf Tour, winning twice in 2006, and once in 2007, 2008, 2011, and 2014.

Kondo managed to qualify for The Open Championship three times; 2007, 2009, 2014. Missing the cut each time

== Amateur wins ==
- 1998 Asian Games

== Professional wins (6) ==
=== Japan Golf Tour wins (6) ===
Legend
Japan majors (1)
Other Japan Golf Tour (5)

No.	Date	Tournament	Winning score	Margin of victory	Runner(s)-up
1	14 May 2006	Japan PGA Championship	−10 (68-70-71-69=278)	Playoff	(Japan) Katsuyoshi Tomori
2	17 Sep 2006	ANA Open	−10 (69-64-72-69=274)	1 stroke	(Japan) Kiyoshi Maita, (Japan) Kaname Yokoo
3	3 Jun 2007	JCB Classic	−13 (68-66-68-69=271)	1 stroke	(South Korea) Lee Seong-ho, (Japan) Koumei Oda, (Japan) Mamo Osanai, (Japan) Azuma Yano
4	4 May 2008	The Crowns	−9 (72-68-64-67=271)	Playoff	(Japan) Hiroyuki Fujita
5	24 Apr 2011	Tsuruya Open	−19 (66-63-70-66=265)	4 strokes	(South Korea) Bae Sang-moon, (Japan) Nobuhiro Masuda
6	9 Nov 2014	Heiwa PGM Championship	−20 (68-66-64-66=264)	4 strokes	(Japan) Yoshinori Fujimoto, (South Korea) Ryu Hyun-woo, (Japan) Hideto Tanihara

Japan Golf Tour playoff record (2–5)

No.	Year	Tournament	Opponent(s)	Result
1	2004	JCB Classic Sendai	(Japan) Takashi Kamiyama, (Japan) Tsuneyuki Nakajima	Kamiyama won with birdie on first extra hole
2	2004	Japan Golf Tour Championship Shishido Hills Cup	(South Korea) Hur Suk-ho	Lost to par on second extra hole
3	2006	Japan PGA Championship	(Japan) Katsuyoshi Tomori	Won with par on first extra hole
4	2006	The Golf Tournament in Omaezaki	(South Korea) Hur Suk-ho, (Japan) Toru Taniguchi	Taniguchi won with birdie on third extra hole Kondo eliminated by birdie on second hole
5	2008	The Crowns	(Japan) Hiroyuki Fujita	Won with par on second extra hole
6	2016	Token Homemate Cup	(South Korea) Kim Kyung-tae	Lost to birdie on first extra hole
7	2022	Golf Partner Pro-Am Tournament	(Japan) Shugo Imahira, (Japan) Tomoharu Otsuki	Imahira won with birdie on second extra hole Otsuki eliminated by par on first hole

== Results in major championships ==
Tournament	2007	2008	2009	2010	2011	2012	2013	2014
The Open Championship	CUT		CUT					CUT

Did not play

CUT = missed the half-way cut
Note: Kondo only played in The Open Championship.

== Team appearances ==
Amateur

- Eisenhower Trophy (representing Japan): 1998

Professional

- Dynasty Cup (representing Japan): 2003, 2005
