= 2007 Japan Golf Tour =

Golf tour season

2007 Japan Golf Tour season
- Duration: 12 April 2007 – 2 December 2007
- Number of official events: 24
- Most wins: (Australia) Brendan Jones (3) (Japan) Toru Taniguchi (3)
- Money list: (Japan) Toru Taniguchi
- Most Valuable Player: (Japan) Toru Taniguchi
- Rookie of the Year: (South Korea) Lee Seong-ho

The 2007 Japan Golf Tour was the 35th season of the Japan Golf Tour (formerly the PGA of Japan Tour), the main professional golf tour in Japan since it was formed in 1973.

== Schedule ==
The following table lists official events during the 2007 season.

Date	Tournament	Location	Purse (¥)	Winner (Note: The number in brackets after each winner's name is the number of Japan Golf Tour events they had won up to and including that tournament. This information is only shown for Japan Golf Tour members.)	OWGR points	Notes
15 Apr	Token Homemate Cup	Mie	110,000,000	(Japan) Yui Ueda (1)	16	
22 Apr	Tsuruya Open	Hyōgo	100,000,000	(Australia) Brendan Jones (6)	16	
29 Apr	The Crowns	Aichi	120,000,000	(Japan) Hirofumi Miyase (7)	18	
13 May	Japan PGA Championship	Okinawa	130,000,000	(Japan) Toshimitsu Izawa (16)	16	Japan major
20 May	Munsingwear Open KSB Cup	Okayama	100,000,000	(Japan) Ryo Ishikawa (a) (1)	16	
27 May	Mitsubishi Diamond Cup Golf	Ibaraki	110,000,000	(Japan) Tetsuji Hiratsuka (4)	16	
3 Jun	JCB Classic	Miyagi	100,000,000	(Japan) Tomohiro Kondo (3)	16	
24 Jun	Gateway to The Open Mizuno Open Yomiuri Classic	Hyōgo	130,000,000	(South Korea) Lee Dong-hwan (1)	16	
1 Jul	UBS Japan Golf Tour Championship ShishidoHills	Ibaraki	150,000,000	(Japan) Shingo Katayama (22)	16	Japan major
8 Jul	Woodone Open Hiroshima	Hiroshima	100,000,000	(Japan) Toru Taniguchi (12)	16	
15 Jul	Nagashima Shigeo Invitational Sega Sammy Cup	Hokkaidō	150,000,000	(Japan) Toru Taniguchi (13)	16	
5 Aug	Sun Chlorella Classic	Hokkaidō	150,000,000	(Japan) Jun Kikuchi (1)	16	
26 Aug	KBC Augusta	Fukuoka	100,000,000	(Japan) Katsumasa Miyamoto (6)	16	
2 Sep	Fujisankei Classic	Yamanashi	150,000,000	(Japan) Hideto Tanihara (5)	16	
9 Sep	Suntory Open	Chiba	100,000,000	(Japan) Hideto Tanihara (6)	16	
16 Sep	ANA Open	Hokkaidō	100,000,000	(Japan) Norio Shinozaki (1)	16	
30 Sep	Coca-Cola Tokai Classic	Aichi	120,000,000	(Colombia) Camilo Villegas (n/a)	16	
14 Oct	Japan Open Golf Championship	Kanagawa	200,000,000	(Japan) Toru Taniguchi (14)	32	Flagship event (Note: Also a Japan major championship.)
21 Oct	Bridgestone Open	Chiba	110,000,000	(Japan) Shingo Katayama (23)	16	
28 Oct	ABC Championship	Hyōgo	120,000,000	(Philippines) Frankie Miñoza (7)	18	
11 Nov	Mitsui Sumitomo Visa Taiheiyo Masters	Shizuoka	150,000,000	(Australia) Brendan Jones (7)	26	
18 Nov	Dunlop Phoenix Tournament	Miyazaki	200,000,000	(England) Ian Poulter (n/a)	36	
25 Nov	Casio World Open	Kōchi	140,000,000	(Japan) Taichi Teshima (6)	20	
2 Dec	Golf Nippon Series JT Cup	Tokyo	100,000,000	(Australia) Brendan Jones (8)	20	Japan major

=== Unofficial events ===
The following events were sanctioned by the Japan Golf Tour, but did not carry official money, nor were wins official.

Date	Tournament	Location	Purse (¥)	Winner(s)	OWGR points	Notes
8 Apr	Masters Tournament	United States	US$7,000,000	(United States) Zach Johnson	100	Major championship
17 Jun	MastersGC Classic	Hyōgo	30,000,000	(Japan) Naoya Takemoto	n/a	
17 Jun	U.S. Open	United States	US$7,000,000	(Argentina) Ángel Cabrera	100	Major championship
22 Jul	The Open Championship	Scotland	£4,200,000	(Republic of Ireland) Pádraig Harrington	100	Major championship
12 Aug	PGA Championship	United States	US$7,000,000	(United States) Tiger Woods	100	Major championship
10 Sep	Hirao Masaaki Charity Golf	Chiba	20,800,000	(Japan) Hirofumi Miyase	n/a	
8 Dec	Hitachi 3Tours Championship	Chiba	80,000,000	Japan Golf Tour	n/a	Team event

== Money list ==
The money list was based on prize money won during the season, calculated in Japanese yen.

Position	Player	Prize money (¥)
1	(Japan) Toru Taniguchi	171,744,498
2	(Japan) Shingo Katayama	141,053,934
3	(Australia) Brendan Jones	115,531,323
4	(Japan) Hideto Tanihara	77,622,976
5	(Japan) Tomohiro Kondo	74,841,936

== Awards ==
Award	Winner	Ref.
Most Valuable Player	(Japan) Toru Taniguchi	
Rookie of the Year (Shimada Trophy)	(South Korea) Lee Seong-ho	

== Japan Challenge Tour ==
2007 Japan Challenge Tour season
- Duration: 5 April 2007 – 21 October 2007
- Number of official events: 11
- Most wins: (Japan) Michio Matsumura (2) (Japan) Shinichi Yokota (2)
- Money list: (Japan) Michio Matsumura

The 2007 Japan Challenge Tour was the 23rd season of the Japan Challenge Tour, the official development tour to the Japan Golf Tour.

=== Schedule ===
The following table lists official events during the 2007 season.

Date	Tournament	Location	Purse (¥)	Winner (Note: The number in brackets after each winner's name is the number of Japan Challenge Tour events they had won up to and including that tournament. It is rare for someone to accumulate many wins on the Japan Challenge Tour as success at this level usually leads to promotion to the Japan Golf Tour.)
7 Apr	PRGR Cup	Chiba	15,000,000	(Japan) Naomi Ohta (1)
31 May	Everlife Cup Challenge Tournament	Fukuoka	10,000,000	(Japan) Shinichi Yokota (1)
8 Jun	Segasammy Challenge	Ibaraki	10,000,000	(Japan) Yoshi Mizumaki (1)
22 Jun	Mochizuki Tokyu JGTO Challenge I	Nagano	13,000,000	(Japan) Shinichi Yokota (2)
28 Jul	Kanitop Cup Challenge Tournament	Miyagi	20,000,000	(Japan) Masao Nakajima (1)
3 Aug	Sashima JGTO Challenge II	Ibaraki	13,000,000	(Japan) Satoshi Tomiyama (1)
13 Sep	Srixon Challenge	Aichi	10,000,000	(Japan) Toshikazu Sugihara (1)
22 Sep	SYNX Novil Cup	Tokushima	20,000,000	(Japan) Takashi Kanemoto (1)
29 Sep	BMW Challenge Cup	Ibaraki	15,000,000	(Japan) Kazunori Suzuki (1)
5 Oct	Par 72 Challenge Cup	Tochigi	15,000,000	(Japan) Michio Matsumura (1)
21 Oct	PRGR Cup Final	Chiba	15,000,000	(Japan) Michio Matsumura (2)

=== Money list ===
The money list was based on prize money won during the season, calculated in Japanese yen. The top seven players on the money list earned status to play on the 2008 Japan Golf Tour.

Position	Player	Prize money (¥)
1	(Japan) Michio Matsumura	6,685,183
2	(Japan) Satoshi Tomiyama	5,778,865
3	(Japan) Naomi Ohta	5,721,750
4	(Japan) Shinichi Yokota	5,517,270
5	(Japan) Masao Nakajima	5,314,523
6	(Japan) Takashi Kanemoto	4,268,958
7	(Japan) Toshikazu Sugihara	3,863,730
