= Masaya Tomida =

Japanese golfer

Personal information
- Nationality: Japan
- Born: 15 September 1977 (age 49) Mie Prefecture, Japan
- Height: 1.85 m (6 ft 1 in)
- Weight: 85 kg (187 lb; 13.4 st)

Career
- Sport: Golf
- Status: Professional
- Current tour: Japan Golf Tour
- Professional wins: 2

Number of wins by tour
- Japan Golf Tour: 1
- Other: 1

Masaya Tomida (born 15 September 1977) is a Japanese professional golfer.

== Career ==
Tomida was born in Mie Prefecture. He currently plays on the Japan Golf Tour where he has won once in 2009 at the Tsuruya Open.

== Professional wins (2) ==
=== Japan Golf Tour wins (1) ===
No.	Date	Tournament	Winning score	Margin of victory	Runner-up
1	26 Apr 2009	Tsuruya Open	−15 (68-66-64=198) (Note: Shortened to 54 holes due to weather.)	2 strokes	(New Zealand) David Smail

=== Japan Challenge Tour wins (1) ===
No.	Date	Tournament	Winning score	Margin of victory	Runner-up
1	15 Apr 2005	PRGR Cup (Kanto)	−7 (65-70=135)	2 strokes	(Taiwan) Chen Yuan-chi
