= 2003 Japan Golf Tour =

Golf tour season

2003 Japan Golf Tour season
- Duration: 19 December 2002 – 7 December 2003
- Number of official events: 29
- Most wins: (United States) Todd Hamilton (4)
- Money list: (Japan) Toshimitsu Izawa
- Most Valuable Player: (Japan) Toshimitsu Izawa
- Rookie of the Year: (Japan) Hideto Tanihara

The 2003 Japan Golf Tour was the 31st season of the Japan Golf Tour (formerly the PGA of Japan Tour), the main professional golf tour in Japan since it was formed in 1973.

== Schedule ==
The following table lists official events during the 2003 season.

Date	Tournament	Location	Purse (¥)	Winner (Note: The number in brackets after each winner's name is the number of Japan Golf Tour events they had won up to and including that tournament. This information is only shown for Japan Golf Tour members.)	OWGR points	Other tours (Note: ASA − Asian PGA Tour.)	Notes
22 Dec	Asia Japan Okinawa Open	Okinawa	100,000,000	(Japan) Hiroyuki Fujita (3)	12	ASA	New to Japan Golf Tour
6 Apr	Token Homemate Cup	Mie	100,000,000	(Australia) Andre Stolz (1)	16		
27 Apr	Tsuruya Open	Hyōgo	100,000,000	(Japan) Hirofumi Miyase (5)	16		
4 May	The Crowns	Aichi	120,000,000	(Japan) Hidemasa Hoshino (1)	16		
11 May	Fujisankei Classic	Shizuoka	110,000,000	(United States) Todd Hamilton (8)	16		
18 May	Japan PGA Championship	Ibaraki	110,000,000	(Japan) Shingo Katayama (13)	16		Japan major
25 May	Munsingwear Open KSB Cup	Hyōgo	120,000,000	(Japan) Hirofumi Miyase (6)	16		
1 Jun	Diamond Cup Tournament	Ibaraki	110,000,000	(United States) Todd Hamilton (9)	16		
8 Jun	JCB Classic Sendai	Miyagi	100,000,000	(Japan) Katsuyoshi Tomori (7)	16		
22 Jun	Mandom Lucido Yomiuri Open	Hyōgo	100,000,000	(Japan) Hideto Tanihara (1)	16		
29 Jun	Gateway to The Open Mizuno Open	Okayama	100,000,000	(United States) Todd Hamilton (10)	16		
6 Jul	Japan Golf Tour Championship Shishido Hills Cup	Ibaraki	120,000,000	(Japan) Toshimitsu Izawa (13)	16		Japan major
13 Jul	Woodone Open Hiroshima	Hiroshima	100,000,000	(Japan) Toshimitsu Izawa (14)	16		
27 Jul	Sato Foods NST Niigata Open	Niigata	50,000,000	(Japan) Katsumasa Miyamoto (5)	16		
3 Aug	Aiful Cup	Ishikawa	120,000,000	(Japan) Taichi Teshima (3)	16		
10 Aug	Sun Chlorella Classic	Hokkaidō	130,000,000	(Australia) Brendan Jones (2)	16		
31 Aug	Hisamitsu-KBC Augusta	Fukuoka	100,000,000	(Japan) Soushi Tajima (1)	16		
7 Sep	Japan PGA Match-Play Championship	Hokkaidō	80,000,000	(United States) Todd Hamilton (11)	16		
14 Sep	Suntory Open	Chiba	100,000,000	(India) Jyoti Randhawa (1)	16		
21 Sep	ANA Open	Hokkaidō	100,000,000	(Taiwan) Yeh Wei-tze (1)	16		
28 Sep	Acom International	Ibaraki	120,000,000	(Japan) Masahiro Kuramoto (30)	16		
12 Oct	Georgia Tokai Classic	Aichi	120,000,000	(Japan) Nozomi Kawahara (1)	16		
19 Oct	Japan Open Golf Championship	Tochigi	120,000,000	(Japan) Keiichiro Fukabori (6)	32		Flagship event (Note: Also a Japan major championship.)
26 Oct	Bridgestone Open	Chiba	110,000,000	(Japan) Naomichi Ozaki (30)	16		
2 Nov	ABC Championship	Hyōgo	120,000,000	(Japan) Shingo Katayama (14)	16		
16 Nov	Mitsui Sumitomo Visa Taiheiyo Masters	Shizuoka	150,000,000	(Japan) Kiyoshi Murota (6)	16		
23 Nov	Dunlop Phoenix Tournament	Miyazaki	200,000,000	(Denmark) Thomas Bjørn (n/a)	20		
30 Nov	Casio World Open	Kagoshima	140,000,000	(Japan) Katsumune Imai (1)	16		
7 Dec	Golf Nippon Series JT Cup	Tokyo	100,000,000	(Japan) Tetsuji Hiratsuka (1)	16		Japan major

=== Unofficial events ===
The following events were sanctioned by the Japan Golf Tour, but did not carry official money, nor were wins official.

Date	Tournament	Location	Purse	Winner	OWGR points	Other tours	Notes
13 Apr	Masters Tournament	United States	US$6,000,000	(Canada) Mike Weir	100		Major championship
15 Jun	U.S. Open	United States	US$6,000,000	(United States) Jim Furyk	100		Major championship
20 Jul	The Open Championship	England	£3,900,000	(United States) Ben Curtis	100		Major championship
17 Aug	PGA Championship	United States	US$6,000,000	(United States) Shaun Micheel	100		Major championship

== Money list ==
The money list was based on prize money won during the season, calculated in Japanese yen.

Position	Player	Prize money (¥)
1	(Japan) Toshimitsu Izawa	135,454,300
2	(Japan) Tetsuji Hiratsuka	122,227,033
3	(United States) Todd Hamilton	117,547,151
4	(Japan) Shingo Katayama	117,192,413
5	(Japan) Taichi Teshima	93,688,731

== Awards ==
Award	Winner	Ref.
Most Valuable Player	(Japan) Toshimitsu Izawa	
Rookie of the Year (Shimada Trophy)	(Japan) Hideto Tanihara	

== Japan Challenge Tour ==
2003 Japan Challenge Tour season
- Duration: 17 April 2003 – 23 October 2003
- Number of official events: 11
- Money list: (Japan) Masamichi Uehira

The 2003 Japan Challenge Tour was the 19th season of the Japan Challenge Tour, the official development tour to the Japan Golf Tour.

=== Schedule ===
The following table lists official events during the 2003 season.

Date	Tournament	Location	Purse (¥)	Winner (Note: The number in brackets after each winner's name is the number of Japan Challenge Tour events they had won up to and including that tournament. It is rare for someone to accumulate many wins on the Japan Challenge Tour as success at this level usually leads to promotion to the Japan Golf Tour.)
18 Apr	PRGR Cup (Kanto)	Ibaraki	10,000,000	(South Korea) Kim Hyung-tae (1)
8 May	Tokyo Dome Cup (1st)	Tochigi	10,000,000	(Japan) Kazuhiro Fukunaga (3)
13 Jun	Aiful Challenge Cup Spring	Hyōgo	10,000,000	(Japan) Takuya Taniguchi (1)
27 Jun	PGA Cup Challenge Tournament	Hiroshima	10,000,000	(Japan) Toyokazu Hioki (1)
10 Jul	Tokyo Dome Cup (2nd)	Chiba	10,000,000	(Japan) Yudai Maeda (1)
20 Jul	Kanitop Cup Challenge Tournament	Miyagi	10,000,000	(Japan) Kodai Ichihara (1)
12 Sep	Aiful Challenge Cup Autumn	Aomori	10,000,000	(Japan) Masamichi Uehira (1)
26 Sep	Kasco Cup	Chiba	10,000,000	(Thailand) Thammanoon Sriroj (1)
3 Oct	PRGR Cup (Kansai)	Hyōgo	10,000,000	(Japan) Masayoshi Yamazoe (2)
9 Oct	Kanitop Cup Challenge Tournament (2nd)	Miyagi	10,000,000	(Japan) Takuya Ogawa (1)
23 Oct	Tokyo Dome Cup (3rd)	Tochigi	10,000,000	(Japan) Tomonori Takahashi (1)

=== Money list ===
The money list was based on prize money won during the season, calculated in Japanese yen. The top five players on the money list earned status to play on the 2004 Japan Golf Tour.

Position	Player	Prize money (¥)
1	(Japan) Masamichi Uehira	3,082,833
2	(Japan) Takuya Ogawa	2,846,847
3	(Japan) Kazuhiro Fukunaga	2,836,507
4	(Thailand) Thammanoon Sriroj	2,665,179
5	(South Korea) Kim Hyung-tae	2,533,141
