= Katsunori Kuwabara =

Japanese professional golfer

Personal information
- Nationality: Japan
- Born: 4 April 1969 (age 57) Aichi Prefecture, Japan
- Height: 1.72 m (5 ft 8 in)
- Weight: 71 kg (157 lb; 11.2 st)

Career
- Sport: Golf
- Status: Professional
- Current tour: Japan Golf Tour
- Professional wins: 5

Number of wins by tour
- Japan Golf Tour: 2
- Other: 3
Medal record
Asian Games
Gold medal – first place	1990 Beijing	Men's team

Katsunori Kuwabara (桑原 克典, Kuwabara Katsunori; born 21 January 1969) is a Japanese professional golfer.

== Career ==
Kuwabara, graduate of Aichi Gakuin University, plays on the Japan Golf Tour and has won twice.

== Professional wins (5) ==
=== PGA of Japan Tour wins (2) ===
No.	Date	Tournament	Winning score	Margin of victory	Runner-up
1	20 Aug 1995	Acom International	46 pts (6-13-15-12=46)	5 points	(Japan) Tsukasa Watanabe
2	6 Sep 1998	Japan PGA Match-Play Championship Promise Cup	38 holes		(Japan) Shinichi Yokota

=== Japan Challenge Tour wins (2) ===
- 1992 Korakuen Cup (4th)
- 2013 Heiwa PGM Challenge III Road to Championship

=== Other wins (1) ===
- 2009 Hokkaido Open

== Team appearances ==
- World Cup (representing Japan): 1996
- Dynasty Cup (representing Japan): 2003
