= Nobuhiro Masuda =

Japanese professional golfer (born 1973)

Personal information
- Nationality: Japan
- Born: 10 March 1973 (age 53) Chiba Prefecture, Japan
- Height: 1.75 m (5 ft 9 in)
- Weight: 85 kg (187 lb; 13.4 st)

Career
- Sport: Golf
- Turned professional: 1998
- Current tour: Japan PGA Senior Tour
- Former tour: Japan Golf Tour
- Professional wins: 7

Number of wins by tour
- Japan Golf Tour: 1
- Other: 6

Best results in major championships
- Masters Tournament: DNP
- PGA Championship: DNP
- U.S. Open: CUT: 2007
- The Open Championship: DNP

Nobuhiro Masuda (増田 伸洋, Masuda Nobuhiro; born 10 March 1973) is a Japanese professional golfer.

== Career ==
Masuda plays on the Japan Golf Tour, where he has won once.

== Professional wins (7) ==
=== Japan Golf Tour wins (1) ===
No.	Date	Tournament	Winning score	Margin of victory	Runner-up
1	18 Jun 2006	Mandom Lucido Yomiuri Open	−14 (69-70-67-68=274)	1 stroke	(South Korea) Yang Yong-eun

=== Japan Challenge Tour wins (1) ===
No.	Date	Tournament	Winning score	Margin of victory	Runner-up
1	31 May 2002	JGTO iiyama Challenge II	−11 (67-66=133)	1 stroke	(Japan) Masakazu Yamauchi

=== Other wins (2) ===
- 2003 Hokkaido Open
- 2004 Hokkaido Open

=== Japan PGA Senior Tour wins (3) ===
No.	Date	Tournament	Winning score	Margin of victory	Runner-up
1	18 Nov 2023	Sumaiida Cup Senior	−11 (66-67=133)	2 strokes	(Thailand) Thaworn Wiratchant
2	6 Oct 2024	PGA Senior Championship Tsuburaya Fields Cup	−11 (68-70-68-66=272)	3 strokes	(Japan) Katsumasa Miyamoto
3	3 Nov 2024	Cosmohealth Cup Senior	−13 (62-69=131)	Playoff	(Japan) Katsumasa Miyamoto
