= Nozomi Kawahara =

Japanese professional golfer

Personal information
- Nationality: Japan
- Born: 16 July 1970 (age 56) Kanagawa Prefecture, Japan
- Height: 1.83 m (6 ft 0 in)
- Weight: 85 kg (187 lb; 13.4 st)

Career
- Sport: Golf
- Turned professional: 1994
- Current tour: Japan Golf Tour
- Professional wins: 1

Number of wins by tour
- Japan Golf Tour: 1

Nozomi Kawahara (born 16 July 1970) is a Japanese professional golfer.

== Career ==
Kawahara plays on the Japan Golf Tour, where he has won once.

== Professional wins (1) ==
=== Japan Golf Tour wins (1) ===
No.	Date	Tournament	Winning score	Margin of victory	Runners-up
1	12 Oct 2003	Georgia Tokai Classic	−13 (69-68-69-69=275)	1 stroke	(Japan) Shingo Katayama, (Japan) Tsuyoshi Yoneyama

Japan Golf Tour playoff record (0–1)

No.	Year	Tournament	Opponent	Result
1	2005	Token Homemate Cup	(Japan) Tadahiro Takayama	Lost to birdie on third extra hole
