= Toshimitsu Izawa =

Japanese professional golfer

Toshimitsu Izawa 伊沢利光
Personal information
- Nationality: Japan
- Born: 2 March 1968 (age 58) Kanagawa Prefecture, Japan
- Height: 1.69 m (5 ft 7 in)
- Weight: 68 kg (150 lb; 10.7 st)

Career
- Sport: Golf
- College: Nihon Taiiku University
- Turned professional: 1989
- Current tour: Japan PGA Senior Tour
- Former tour: Japan Golf Tour
- Professional wins: 19
- Highest ranking: 15 (16 December 2001)

Number of wins by tour
- Japan Golf Tour: 16
- Other: 3

Best results in major championships
- Masters Tournament: T4: 2001
- PGA Championship: T18: 2003
- U.S. Open: T44: 2001
- The Open Championship: T22: 2002

Achievements and awards
- Japan Golf Tour money list winner: 2001, 2003
- Japan Golf Tour Most Valuable Player: 2001, 2003

Toshimitsu Izawa (Japanese: 伊沢利光, born 2 March 1968) is a Japanese professional golfer. He is sometimes known outside Japan as Toshi Izawa.

== Career ==
In 1968, Izawa was born in Kanagawa. He then attended Nihon Taiiku University.

In 1989, Izawa turned professional. Izawa's career on the Japan Golf Tour developed quite slowly. His first win came in 1995, and he did not make the top ten on the money list until 1999, when he was thirty one years old. He went on to top the money list in 2001 and 2003. In the first of those years he set a record of ¥217,934,583 in earnings which survived through the 2004 season, and his dominant form in Japan lifted him into the top twenty in the Official World Golf Ranking.

He has 16 victories on the Japan Golf Tour and is eighth on the career money list (through 2013).

Izawa has only played a limited number of tournaments outside Japan. However, he has had some success in these rare appearances. In early 2001, he finished joint runner-up at the PGA Tour's Nissan Open. Months later, he finished tied fourth at the 2001 Masters Tournament. In 2002, he won the WGC-World Cup for Japan in partnership with Shigeki Maruyama.

== Professional wins (19) ==
=== Japan Golf Tour wins (16) ===
Legend
Flagship events (1)
Japan majors (3)
Other Japan Golf Tour (12)

No.	Date	Tournament	Winning score	Margin of victory	Runner(s)-up
1	1 Oct 1995	Japan Open Golf Championship	−7 (67-70-70-70=277)	1 stroke	(Japan) Kazuhiko Hosokawa
2	11 Oct 1998	Tokai Classic	−11 (73-66-70-68=277)	3 strokes	(Japan) Nobumitsu Yuhara
3	25 Jul 1999	Aiful Cup	−14 (67-72-68-67=274)	1 stroke	(Japan) Toru Taniguchi
4	1 Aug 1999	NST Niigata Open Golf Championship	−19 (64-67-68-70=269)	6 strokes	(Japan) Kazuhiko Hosokawa
5	2 Jul 2000	JGTO TPC iiyama Cup	−13 (63-70-70=203) (Note: Shortened to 54 holes due to weather.)	3 strokes	(Japan) Kaname Yokoo
6	27 Aug 2000	Hisamitsu-KBC Augusta	−18 (67-65-71-67=270)	4 strokes	(Japan) Shusaku Sugimoto
7	12 Nov 2000	Sumitomo Visa Taiheiyo Masters	−14 (68-69-66-71=274)	1 stroke	(Japan) Keiichiro Fukabori
8	27 May 2001	Diamond Cup Tournament	−11 (77-68-64-68=277)	Playoff	(Japan) Hiroyuki Fujita, (Japan) Yuji Igarashi
9	23 Sep 2001	Mitsui Sumitomo Visa Taiheiyo Masters (2)	−18 (66-67-68-69=270)	2 strokes	(Japan) Yūsaku Miyazato (a), (Japan) Shigeru Nonaka
10	7 Oct 2001	Georgia Tokai Classic (2)	−16 (65-68-70-69=272)	2 strokes	(Japan) Tomohiro Kondo, (Taiwan) Lin Keng-chi
11	21 Oct 2001	Bridgestone Open	−14 (71-67-67-69=274)	1 stroke	(Japan) Masashi Ozaki
12	28 Oct 2001	Philip Morris K.K. Championship	−16 (67-67-66-72=272)	1 stroke	(Japan) Hidemichi Tanaka, (Japan) Toru Taniguchi
13	6 Jul 2003	Japan Golf Tour Championship Shishido Hills Cup (2)	−14 (70-63-68-69=270)	1 stroke	(New Zealand) David Smail, (Japan) Tadahiro Takayama
14	13 Jul 2003	Woodone Open Hiroshima	−13 (66-68-69-72=275)	Playoff	(Japan) Kiyoshi Murota
15	28 Aug 2005	Under Armour KBC Augusta	−20 (67-65-67-65=264)	5 strokes	(Thailand) Prayad Marksaeng, (Japan) Ryuichi Oda
16	13 May 2007	Japan PGA Championship	−5 (68-70-72-73=283)	1 stroke	(Japan) Satoru Hirota

Japan Golf Tour playoff record (2–1)

No.	Year	Tournament	Opponent(s)	Result
1	1998	Casio World Open	(United States) Brian Watts	Lost to birdie on second extra hole
2	2001	Diamond Cup Tournament	(Japan) Hiroyuki Fujita, (Japan) Yuji Igarashi	Won with par on first extra hole
3	2003	Woodone Open Hiroshima	(Japan) Kiyoshi Murota	Won with par on first extra hole

=== Other wins (1) ===
Legend
World Golf Championships (1)
Other wins (0)

No.	Date	Tournament	Winning score	Margin of victory	Runners-up
1	15 Dec 2002	WGC-World Cup (with (Japan) Shigeki Maruyama)	−36 (64-64-58-66=252)	2 strokes	United States − Phil Mickelson and David Toms

=== Japan PGA Senior Tour wins (2) ===
No.	Date	Tournament	Winning score	Margin of victory	Runner-up
1	27 Oct 2019	Fukuoka Senior Open Golf Tournament	−8 (67-69=136)	1 stroke	(Japan) Yoshinobu Tsukada
2	25 Aug 2024	Maruhan Cup Pacific Club Senior	−12 (62-68=130)	1 stroke	(South Korea) Choi Ho-sung

== Playoff record ==
PGA Tour playoff record (0–1)

No.	Year	Tournament	Opponents	Result
1	2001	Nissan Open	(Australia) Robert Allenby, (United States) Brandel Chamblee (United States) Dennis Paulson, (United States) Jeff Sluman, (United States) Bob Tway	Allenby won with birdie on first extra hole

== Results in major championships ==
Tournament	1999	2000	2001	2002	2003	2004	2005	2006	2007
Masters Tournament			T4	CUT	CUT	CUT			
U.S. Open			T44	WD		CUT			
The Open Championship				T22					CUT
PGA Championship	CUT	T39		T53	T18				

Top 10
Did not play

CUT = missed the half-way cut
WD = withdrew
"T" = tied

== Results in World Golf Championships ==
Tournament	2001	2002	2003	2004
Match Play	R32	R32	R16	R64
Invitational		T24	T14	
Championship	NT^{1}		T25	

^{1}Cancelled due to 9/11

Top 10
Did not play

QF, R16, R32, R64 = Round in which player lost in match play
"T" = Tied
NT = No tournament

== Team appearances ==
- World Cup (representing Japan): 2001, 2002 (winners)

== See also ==
- List of golfers with most Japan Golf Tour wins
