= Hirofumi Miyase =

Japanese golfer (born 1971)

Hirofumi Miyase 宮瀬博文
Personal information
- Nationality: Japan
- Born: 11 April 1971 (age 55) Chiba Prefecture, Japan
- Height: 1.71 m (5 ft 7 in)
- Weight: 71 kg (157 lb; 11.2 st)
- Life partner: Chieko Miyase
- Children: 2

Career
- Sport: Golf
- Turned professional: 1989
- Current tour: Japan Golf Tour
- Former tour: PGA Tour
- Professional wins: 8
- Highest ranking: 86 (8 April 2001)

Number of wins by tour
- Japan Golf Tour: 7
- Other: 1

Best results in major championships
- Masters Tournament: DNP
- PGA Championship: DNP
- U.S. Open: DNP
- The Open Championship: T68: 2010

Hirofumi Miyase (Japanese: 宮瀬博文, born 11 April 1971) is a Japanese professional golfer.

== Career ==
Miyase was born in Chiba Prefecture and would join the Japan Golf Tour after turning professional. He won his first title on the Japan Golf Tour in 1997 and would add six more wins between then and 2007.

In 2004, Miyase played on the PGA Tour in the United States after finishing T28 at qualifying school. He made only five cuts in 27 starts and lost his tour card. His best finish was a T9 at the FedEx St. Jude Classic.

== Professional wins (8) ==
=== Japan Golf Tour wins (7) ===
No.	Date	Tournament	Winning score	Margin of victory	Runner(s)-up
1	15 Jun 1997	Sapporo Tokyu Open	−13 (67-70-66-72=275)	5 strokes	(Japan) Hajime Meshiai
2	14 Nov 1999	Sumitomo Visa Taiheiyo Masters	−14 (66-70-69-69=274)	Playoff	(Northern Ireland) Darren Clarke, (Japan) Ryoken Kawagishi
3	28 May 2000	Mitsubishi Motors Tournament	−8 (70-69-68-69=276)	Playoff	(Japan) Toru Taniguchi
4	8 Oct 2000	Tokai Classic	−12 (70-70-70-66=276)	1 stroke	(Japan) Toru Taniguchi
5	27 Apr 2003	Tsuruya Open	−14 (68-62-70-70=270)	Playoff	(Japan) Takashi Kanemoto, (Japan) Hisayuki Sasaki
6	25 May 2003	Munsingwear Open KSB Cup	−13 (67-71-69-68=275)	3 strokes	(South Korea) Hur Suk-ho
7	29 Apr 2007	The Crowns	−2 (67-70-70-71=278)	Playoff	(Japan) Toru Taniguchi

Japan Golf Tour playoff record (4–2)

No.	Year	Tournament	Opponent(s)	Result
1	1994	Maruman Open	(United States) David Ishii, (Japan) Nobuo Serizawa	Ishii won with birdie on first extra hole
2	1999	Gene Sarazen Jun Classic	(Japan) Hajime Meshiai	Lost to birdie on first extra hole
3	1999	Sumitomo Visa Taiheiyo Masters	(Northern Ireland) Darren Clarke, (Japan) Ryoken Kawagishi	Won with par on second extra hole Kawagishi eliminated by par on first hole
4	2000	Mitsubishi Motors Tournament	(Japan) Toru Taniguchi	Won with eagle on second extra hole
5	2003	Tsuruya Open	(Japan) Takashi Kanemoto, (Japan) Hisayuki Sasaki	Won with par on first extra hole
6	2007	The Crowns	(Japan) Toru Taniguchi	Won with par on first extra hole

=== Other wins (1) ===
- 2007 Hirao Masaaki Charity Golf

== Results in major championships ==
Tournament	1997	1998	1999	2000	2001	2002	2003	2004	2005	2006	2007	2008	2009	2010
The Open Championship	CUT			CUT			CUT							T68

Did not play

CUT = missed the half-way cut
"T" = tied
Note: Miyase only played in The Open Championship.

== Results in World Golf Championships ==
Tournament	2001
Match Play	R64
Championship	NT^{1}
Invitational	

^{1}Cancelled due to 9/11

Did not play

QF, R16, R32, R64 = Round in which player lost in match play
NT = No tournament

== Team appearances ==
- World Cup (representing Japan): 1992

== See also ==
- 2003 PGA Tour Qualifying School graduates
