= Shinichi Yokota =

Japanese golfer

Personal information
- Nationality: Japan
- Born: 6 February 1972 (age 54) Tokyo, Japan
- Height: 1.68 m (5 ft 6 in)
- Weight: 75 kg (165 lb; 11.8 st)
- Spouse: Yuko Anai

Career
- Sport: Golf
- Status: Professional
- Current tour: Japan Golf Tour
- Professional wins: 5

Number of wins by tour
- Japan Golf Tour: 2
- Other: 3

Shinichi Yokota (born 6 February 1972) is a Japanese professional golfer.

== Professional career ==
Yokota has won twice on the Japan Golf Tour and twice on the Japan Challenge Tour.

== Personal life ==
Yokota is married to singer Yuko Anai.

== Professional wins (5) ==
=== Japan Golf Tour wins (2) ===
No.	Date	Tournament	Winning score	Margin of victory	Runner(s)-up
1	21 Sep 1997	ANA Open	−15 (68-65-72-68=273)	3 strokes	(Myanmar) Zaw Moe, (Japan) Tateo Ozaki
2	10 Oct 2010	Canon Open	−14 (69-68-70-67=274)	2 strokes	(Japan) Ryo Ishikawa

=== Japan Challenge Tour wins (2) ===
No.	Date	Tournament	Winning score	Margin of victory	Runner(s)-up
1	31 May 2007	Everlife Cup Challenge Tournament	−9 (64-69=133)	5 strokes	(Japan) Kyoji Hirota, (Japan) Hirohito Koizumi, (Japan) Tatsuya Mitsuhashi, (Japan) Satoshi Tomiyama
2	22 Jun 2007	Mochizuki Tokyu JGTO Challenge I	−10 (64-69=134)	1 stroke	(Japan) Kunihari Kamii

=== Other wins (1) ===
- 2005 Hitachi 3Tours Championship
