= Japan Golf Tour =

Professional golf tour

- Current season, competition or edition: 2026 Japan Golf Tour
- Formerly: iiyama Tour; PGA of Japan Tour
- Sport: Golf
- Founded: 1973
- Founder: PGA of Japan
- First season: 1973
- Director: Isao Aoki
- Countries: Based in Japan (Note: Schedules have also included events in China, Indonesia, South Korea, Myanmar, New Zealand, Singapore and Thailand.)
- Most titles: Money list titles: (Japan) Masashi Ozaki (12); Tournament wins: (Japan) Masashi Ozaki (94)
- Related competitions: Japan Challenge Tour
- Website: jgto.org

The Japan Golf Tour (Japanese: 日本ゴルフツアー機構) is a prominent professional golf tour. It was founded in 1973. As of 2006, it offered the third-highest annual prize fund out of the regular (that is not for seniors) men's professional tours after the PGA Tour and the European Tour. However, since the early 1990s, the growth in prize money has not kept pace with that of the two larger tours. Official events on the Japan Golf Tour count for Official World Golf Ranking points, and success on the tour can also qualify members to play in the majors.

== Background ==
Most of the leading players on the tour are Japanese, but players from many other countries also participate. The tour is currently run by the Japan Golf Tour Organization (JGTO), which was established in 1999 to separate the tour from the PGA of Japan. The JGTO also organises a developmental tour called the Japan Challenge Tour.

Masashi Ozaki, also known as Jumbo Ozaki, was the dominant player on tour. He led the career wins list with 94, the career money list with over ¥2 billion, and the money list a record twelve times between 1973 and 1998.

Entry to The Open Championship is given to Order of Merit winner and runner-up, Japan Open Golf Championship winner, two players not already exempt from the money list up to the Japan Golf Tour Championship and the top four non-exempt players from the Mizuno Open.

In 2000, the tour signed a title sponsorship agreement with Iiyama, being renamed as the iiyama Tour. The agreement was reported to be worth ¥1,500,000,000 over three years.

In 2008, the tour ventured outside of Japan for the first time, co-sanctioning the Pine Valley Beijing Open in China, alongside the Asian Tour. In 2013, the tour also co-sanctioned two events at the beginning of the year in Thailand and Indonesia with the OneAsia Tour.

In December 2022, a new agreement involving the JGTO, PGA Tour and European Tour was announced. As part of the deal, from 2023 onwards, the top three on the Japan Golf Tour's season-ending money list earned status to play on the European Tour for the following season.

== Money list winners ==
Season	Winner	Prize money (¥)
2025	(Japan) Kota Kaneko	120,231,009
2024	(Japan) Takumi Kanaya	119,551,222
2023	(Japan) Keita Nakajima	184,986,179
2022	(Japan) Kazuki Higa	181,598,825
2020–21	(United States) Chan Kim	127,599,803
2019	(Japan) Shugo Imahira (2)	168,049,312
2018	(Japan) Shugo Imahira	139,119,332
2017	(Japan) Yūsaku Miyazato	182,831,982
2016	(Japan) Yuta Ikeda	207,901,567
2015	(South Korea) Kim Kyung-tae (2)	165,981,625
2014	(Japan) Koumei Oda	137,318,693
2013	(Japan) Hideki Matsuyama	201,076,781
2012	(Japan) Hiroyuki Fujita	175,159,972
2011	(South Korea) Bae Sang-moon	151,078,958
2010	(South Korea) Kim Kyung-tae	181,103,799
2009	(Japan) Ryo Ishikawa	183,524,051
2008	(Japan) Shingo Katayama (5)	180,094,895
2007	(Japan) Toru Taniguchi (2)	171,744,498
2006	(Japan) Shingo Katayama (4)	178,402,190
2005	(Japan) Shingo Katayama (3)	134,075,280
2004	(Japan) Shingo Katayama (2)	119,512,374
2003	(Japan) Toshimitsu Izawa (2)	135,454,300
2002	(Japan) Toru Taniguchi	145,440,341
2001	(Japan) Toshimitsu Izawa	217,934,583
2000	(Japan) Shingo Katayama	177,116,489
1999	(Japan) Naomichi Ozaki (2)	137,641,796
1998	(Japan) Masashi Ozaki (12)	179,627,400
1997	(Japan) Masashi Ozaki (11)	170,847,633
1996	(Japan) Masashi Ozaki (10)	209,646,746
1995	(Japan) Masashi Ozaki (9)	192,319,800
1994	(Japan) Masashi Ozaki (8)	215,468,000
1993	(Japan) Hajime Meshiai	148,718,200
1992	(Japan) Masashi Ozaki (7)	186,816,466
1991	(Japan) Naomichi Ozaki	119,507,974
1990	(Japan) Masashi Ozaki (6)	129,060,500
1989	(Japan) Masashi Ozaki (5)	108,715,733
1988	(Japan) Masashi Ozaki (4)	125,162,540
1987	(United States) David Ishii	86,554,421
1986	(Japan) Tsuneyuki Nakajima (4)	90,202,066
1985	(Japan) Tsuneyuki Nakajima (3)	101,609,333
1984	(Japan) Shinsaku Maeda	57,040,357
1983	(Japan) Tsuneyuki Nakajima (2)	85,514,183
1982	(Japan) Tsuneyuki Nakajima	68,220,640
1981	(Japan) Isao Aoki (5)	57,262,941
1980	(Japan) Isao Aoki (4)	60,532,660
1979	(Japan) Isao Aoki (3)	45,554,211
1978	(Japan) Isao Aoki (2)	62,987,200
1977	(Japan) Masashi Ozaki (3)	35,932,608
1976	(Japan) Isao Aoki	40,985,801
1975	(Japan) Takashi Murakami	38,705,551
1974	(Japan) Masashi Ozaki (2)	41,846,908
1973	(Japan) Masashi Ozaki	43,814,000

=== Multiple winners ===
Rank	Player	Wins	Years won
1	(Japan) Masashi Ozaki	12	1973, 1974, 1977, 1988, 1989, 1990, 1992, 1994, 1995, 1996, 1997, 1998
T2	(Japan) Isao Aoki	5	1976, 1978, 1979, 1980, 1981
T2	(Japan) Shingo Katayama	5	2000, 2004, 2005, 2006, 2008
4	(Japan) Tsuneyuki Nakajima	4	1982, 1983, 1985, 1986
T5	(Japan) Shugo Imahira	2	2018, 2019
T5	(Japan) Toshimitsu Izawa	2	2001, 2003
T5	(South Korea) Kim Kyung-tae	2	2010, 2015
T5	(Japan) Naomichi Ozaki	2	1991, 1999
T5	(Japan) Toru Taniguchi	2	2002, 2007

== Awards ==
Season	Most Valuable Player	Rookie of the Year
2025	(Japan) Kota Kaneko	(Japan) Yuta Sugiura
2024	(Japan) Takumi Kanaya	(Japan) Kensei Hirata
2023	(Japan) Keita Nakajima	(Japan) Keita Nakajima
2022	(Japan) Kazuki Higa	(Japan) Yuto Katsuragawa
2020–21	(United States) Chan Kim	(Japan) Takumi Kanaya
2019	(Japan) Shugo Imahira (2)	(Thailand) Jazz Janewattananond
2018	(Japan) Shugo Imahira	(Japan) Rikuya Hoshino
2017	(Japan) Yūsaku Miyazato	(United States) Chan Kim
2016	(Japan) Yuta Ikeda	(South Africa) Shaun Norris
2015	(South Korea) Kim Kyung-tae	(South Korea) Song Young-han
2014	(Japan) Koumei Oda	(South Korea) Kim Seung-hyuk
2013	(Japan) Hideki Matsuyama	(Japan) Hideki Matsuyama
2012	(Japan) Hiroyuki Fujita (2)	(Japan) Yoshinori Fujimoto
2011	(South Korea) Bae Sang-moon	(South Korea) Park Jae-bum
2010	(Japan) Hiroyuki Fujita	(Japan) Shunsuke Sonoda
2009	(Japan) Ryo Ishikawa	(Japan) Yuta Ikeda
2008	(Japan) Shingo Katayama (4)	(Japan) Ryo Ishikawa
2007	(Japan) Toru Taniguchi (3)	(South Korea) Lee Seong-ho
2006	(Japan) Shingo Katayama (3)	(South Korea) Lee Dong-hwan
2005	(Japan) Shingo Katayama (2)	(South Korea) Jang Ik-jae
2004	(Japan) Toru Taniguchi (2)	(Japan) Takuya Taniguchi
2003	(Japan) Toshimitsu Izawa (2)	(Japan) Hideto Tanihara
2002	(Japan) Toru Taniguchi	(Australia) Brendan Jones
2001	(Japan) Toshimitsu Izawa	(Australia) Scott Laycock
2000	(Japan) Shingo Katayama	(United States) Dean Wilson

== Career money leaders ==
The table shows the top ten career money leaders on the Japan Golf Tour through the 2021 season. The figures shown include money won in the four global major championships from 1998 onwards and in the individual World Golf Championships from 1999 to 2009.

Position	Player	Prize money (¥)
1	(Japan) Masashi Ozaki	2,688,836,653
2	(Japan) Shingo Katayama	2,252,278,502
3	(Japan) Tsuneyuki Nakajima	1,664,953,541
4	(Japan) Toru Taniguchi	1,662,207,219
5	(Japan) Naomichi Ozaki	1,545,609,713
6	(Japan) Hiroyuki Fujita	1,533,257,797
7	(Japan) Yuta Ikeda	1,269,641,069
8	(Japan) Hideto Tanihara	1,192,142,233
9	(Japan) Katsumasa Miyamoto	1,166,981,591
10	(Australia) Brendan Jones	1,094,192,410

Japan Golf Tour's website has a full list here.

== Records ==
- Youngest winner: Ryo Ishikawa (amateur) 15 years, 238 days (Munsingwear Open KSB Cup, 2007)

== See also ==
- Japan Golf Association
- List of golfers with most Japan Golf Tour wins
