= Masashi Ozaki =

Japanese professional golfer (1947–2025)

Masashi Ozaki 尾崎 将司
Personal information
- Nickname: Jumbo
- Nationality: Japan
- Born: 24 January 1947 Kaifu District, Tokushima, Japan
- Died: 23 December 2025 (aged 78) Japan
- Height: 1.81 m (5 ft 11 in)
- Weight: 90 kg (198 lb; 14 st 2 lb)

Career
- Sport: Golf
- Turned professional: 1970
- Former tour: Japan Golf Tour
- Professional wins: 114
- Highest ranking: 5 (1 September 1996)

Number of wins by tour
- Japan Golf Tour: 94 (1st all-time)
- Other: 20

Best results in major championships
- Masters Tournament: T8: 1973
- PGA Championship: T47: 1994
- U.S. Open: T6: 1989
- The Open Championship: T10: 1979

Achievements and awards
- World Golf Hall of Fame: 2011 (member page)
- PGA of Japan Tour money list winner: 1973, 1974, 1977, 1988, 1989, 1990, 1992, 1994, 1995, 1996, 1997, 1998

Masashi Ozaki (尾崎 将司, Ozaki Masashi; 24 January 1947 – 23 December 2025) was a Japanese professional golfer. Ozaki is often known as Jumbo Ozaki (ジャンボ尾崎 Janbo Ozaki) on account of his height and length off the tee. He featured in the top ten of the Official World Golf Rankings for almost 200 weeks between 1989 and 1998. He is the most successful player of all time on the Japan Golf Tour, having led the money list a record 12 times and won 94 tournaments, over 40 more than the second highest player. Ozaki was inducted into the World Golf Hall of Fame in 2011.

== Career ==
Ozaki was born in Kaifu District, Tokushima, on 24 January 1947.

He was a professional baseball pitcher/outfielder from 1965 to 1967 with the Nishitetsu Lions. However, he turned to professional golf at the age of 23 and won the Japan PGA Championship the following year.

Ozaki led the Japan Golf Tour in earnings in 1973–1974, 1977, 1988–1990, 1992, and 1994–1998. Ozaki finished 8th at the 1973 Masters Tournament and finished 6th at the 1989 U.S. Open. He competed at the Masters 19 times. He played occasionally on the PGA Tour from 1972 to 2000, in 96 tournaments, though never more than nine in one year. In these starts, his best finish was a T-4 at the 1993 Memorial Tournament. Ozaki played on the International Team in the 1996 Presidents Cup. Ozaki built "AON Age" with his rivals Isao Aoki and Tsuneyuki "Tommy" Nakajima.

As late as 2019, he still played occasionally on the Japan Golf Tour.

== Personal life and death ==
Ozaki's brothers Tateo "Jet" Ozaki and Naomichi "Joe" Ozaki were also professional golfers, both having played and won on the Japan Golf Tour.

Ozaki died of colorectal cancer on 23 December 2025, at the age of 78.

== Awards and honors ==
- Ozaki won the Japan Golf Tour money list 12 times: in 1973, 1974, 1977, 1988, 1989, 1990, 1992, 1994, 1995, 1996, 1997, and 1998
- In 2011, Ozaki was inducted into the World Golf Hall of Fame.

== Professional wins (114) ==
=== Japan Golf Tour wins (94) ===
Legend
Flagship events (2)
Other Japan Golf Tour (92)

No.	Date	Tournament	Winning score	Margin of victory	Runner(s)-up
1	13 May 1973	Kanto Pro Championship	−9 (69-68-72-70=279)		
2	8 Jul 1973	ANA Sapporo Open	−5 (72-70-74-67=283)	2 strokes	(Taiwan) Hsieh Min-Nan
3	5 Aug 1973	Tohoku Classic	−15 (65-68-67-73=273)	3 strokes	(Taiwan) Lu Liang-Huan
4	14 Oct 1973	Taiheiyo Club Masters	−6 (71-67-71-69=278)	Playoff	(United States) Bert Yancey
5	28 Oct 1973	Tokai Classic	−11 (71-65-69-72=277)	1 stroke	(Japan) Isao Aoki
6	23 Jun 1974	Tohoku Classic (2)	−8 (71-70-71-68=280)	3 strokes	(Japan) Haruo Yasuda
7	7 Jul 1974	ANA Sapporo Open (2)	−6 (72-73-71-66=282)	Playoff	(Japan) Isao Aoki
8	18 Aug 1974	Japan PGA Championship	−14 (67-68-66-73=274)	4 strokes	(Japan) Isao Aoki
9	8 Sep 1974	Suntory Open	−16 (66-69-66-71=272)	3 strokes	(Japan) Kosaku Shimada
10	29 Sep 1974	Japan Open Golf Championship	−13 (69-69-68-73=279)	1 stroke	(Japan) Takashi Murakami
11	17 Nov 1974	Golf Nippon Series	−10 (73-69-70-68=280)	4 strokes	(Japan) Takashi Murakami
12	8 Jun 1975	Tohoku Classic (3)	−10 (70-69-67-72=278)	1 stroke	(Japan) Isao Aoki
13	11 Jul 1976	Kanto Open	−6 (69-68-76-69=282)	1 stroke	(Japan) Takashi Murakami
14	5 Sep 1976	Hiroshima Open	−13 (66-66-68=200) (Note: Shortened to 54 holes due to weather.)	1 stroke	(Japan) Teruo Sugihara
15	19 Sep 1976	Sanpo Classic	−16 (72-63-65-72=272)	1 stroke	(Taiwan) Lu Liang-Huan
16	29 May 1977	Pepsi-Wilson Tournament	−14 (69-67-72-66=274)	4 strokes	(Taiwan) Kuo Chie-Hsiung
17	24 Jul 1977	Kanto Open (2)	−11 (73-71-67-66=277)	4 strokes	(Japan) Toshiharu Kawada, (Japan) Takashi Murakami
18	16 Oct 1977	Tokai Classic (2)	−10 (67-69-70-72=278)	1 stroke	(Japan) Kosaku Shimada
19	4 Dec 1977	Golf Nippon Series (2)	−15 (74-66-68-67=275)	4 strokes	(Japan) Isao Aoki
20	21 May 1978	Pepsi-Wilson Tournament (2)	−13 (67-74-65-69=275)	5 strokes	(Japan) Kosaku Shimada
21	24 Sep 1978	Hiroshima Open (2)	−15 (69-66-67-71=273)	Playoff	(Japan) Hideyo Sugimoto
22	27 Apr 1980	Dunlop International Open^{1}	−11 (68-70-69-70=277)	5 strokes	(Taiwan) Ho Ming-chung, (Australia) Graham Marsh
23	11 May 1980	Fujisankei Classic	−5 (72-67-71-73=283)	1 stroke	(Australia) Graham Marsh, (Japan) Takahiro Takeyasu
24	7 Dec 1980	Golf Nippon Series (3)	−7 (72-72-71-68=283)	2 strokes	(Japan) Isao Aoki
25	5 Sep 1982	Kanto Open (3)	+2 (73-72-73-72=290)	1 stroke	(Japan) Yutaka Hagawa
26	30 Oct 1983	Gene Sarazen Jun Classic	E (72-69-72-75=288)	Playoff	(Japan) Masahiro Kuramoto
27	28 Oct 1984	Hiroshima Open (3)	−15 (65-67-69-68=269)	3 strokes	(Japan) Masaji Kusakabe
28	11 May 1986	Fujisankei Classic (2)	−5 (65-72-71-71=279)	1 stroke	(United States) David Ishii
29	17 Aug 1986	Nikkei Cup	−20 (68-66-68-66=268)	4 strokes	(Japan) Ikuo Shirahama
30	24 Aug 1986	Maruman Open	−12 (64-72-70-70=276)	3 strokes	(Japan) Saburo Fujiki, (Japan) Naomichi Ozaki
31	28 Sep 1986	Gene Sarazen Jun Classic (2)	−9 (69-72-68-70=279)	1 stroke	(Japan) Masahiro Kuramoto
32	3 May 1987	The Crowns	−12 (69-67-66-66=268)	6 strokes	(Japan) Isao Aoki, (Australia) Ian Baker-Finch, (Japan) Masahiro Kuramoto, (Japan) Yoshitaka Yamamoto
33	10 May 1987	Fujisankei Classic (3)	−9 (68-72-66-69=275)	2 strokes	(Australia) Graham Marsh
34	27 Sep 1987	Gene Sarazen Jun Classic (3)	−12 (68-69-67=204)	5 strokes	(Japan) Namio Takasu
35	24 Apr 1988	Dunlop Open^{1} (2)	−10 (69-70-69-70=278)	3 strokes	(United States) David Ishii
36	14 Aug 1988	Nikkei Cup (2)	−5 (72-71-72-68=283)	4 strokes	(Japan) Naomichi Ozaki
37	21 Aug 1988	Maruman Open (2)	−6 (73-65-69=207)	3 strokes	(Japan) Hajime Meshiai, (Japan) Yoshimi Niizeki
38	9 Oct 1988	Japan Open Golf Championship (2)	+4 (67-73-75-73=288)	1 stroke	(Japan) Isao Aoki, (Japan) Tsuneyuki Nakajima
39	16 Oct 1988	Polaroid Cup Golf Digest Tournament	−12 (69-72-69-62=272)	Playoff	(Australia) Brian Jones
40	23 Oct 1988	Bridgestone Open	−15 (72-64-68-69=273)	2 strokes	(Japan) Isao Aoki
41	7 May 1989	Fujisankei Classic (4)	−2 (68-68-70-76=282)	2 strokes	(Japan) Katsunari Takahashi
42	14 May 1989	Japan PGA Match-Play Championship Unisys Cup	3 and 2		(Japan) Hiroshi Makino
43	4 Jun 1989	Sendai Classic (4)	−12 (70-65-71-66=272)	3 strokes	(Japan) Tsuneyuki Nakajima, (Japan) Katsunari Takahashi
44	9 Jul 1989	Yonex Open Hiroshima (4)	−18 (69-67-68-66=270)	6 strokes	(Japan) Seiji Ebihara, (Japan) Seiichi Kanai, (Japan) Nobuo Serizawa
45	6 Aug 1989	Japan PGA Championship (2)	−6 (68-68-71-71=278)	1 stroke	(Japan) Hideki Kase
46	17 Sep 1989	ANA Open (3)	−8 (71-70-68-71=280)	6 strokes	(Wales) Ian Woosnam
47	8 Oct 1989	Japan Open Golf Championship (3)	−6 (66-68-67-73=274)	3 strokes	(Australia) Brian Jones
48	6 May 1990	Fujisankei Classic (5)	−5 (67-77-64=208)	1 stroke	(Japan) Saburo Fujiki, (Japan) Masanobu Kimura, (Japan) Tōru Nakamura, (Japan) Naomichi Ozaki, (Japan) Yoshitaka Yamamoto
49	8 Jul 1990	Yonex Open Hiroshima (5)	−10 (69-73-71-65=278)	1 stroke	(Japan) Tsuneyuki Nakajima
50	19 Aug 1990	Maruman Open (2)	−15 (69-70-66-68=273)	5 strokes	(Japan) Tsuneyuki Nakajima
51	26 Aug 1990	Daiwa KBC Augusta	−19 (65-66-68-70=269)	10 strokes	(Taiwan) Chen Tze-chung
52	18 Aug 1991	Japan PGA Championship (3)	−15 (71-73-68-61=273)	6 strokes	(Japan) Tsukasa Watanabe
53	29 Sep 1991	Gene Sarazen Jun Classic (4)	−11 (69-68-70-70=277)	Playoff	(Japan) Ryoken Kawagishi
54	26 Apr 1992	Dunlop Open^{1} (3)	−2 (69-76-72-69=286)	Playoff	(Canada) Brent Franklin
55	3 May 1992	The Crowns (2)	−10 (68-69-66-67=270)	4 strokes	(Canada) Brent Franklin, (Australia) Peter Senior
56	5 Jul 1992	PGA Philanthropy Tournament	−14 (69-64-70-67=270)	3 strokes	(Japan) Saburo Fujiki
57	20 Sep 1992	ANA Open (4)	−8 (70-69-69-72=280)	4 strokes	(Japan) Ryoken Kawagishi
58	11 Oct 1992	Japan Open Golf Championship (4)	−11 (64-73-71-69=277)	5 strokes	(Canada) Brent Franklin, (Japan) Masahiro Kuramoto
59	15 Nov 1992	Visa Taiheiyo Club Masters (2)	−12 (74-66-66-70=276)	1 stroke	(Japan) Masahiro Kuramoto, (Germany) Bernhard Langer, (Japan) Tsukasa Watanabe
60	9 May 1993	Fujisankei Classic (6)	−14 (67-67-68-68=270)	4 strokes	(United States) Todd Hamilton, (Japan) Tsukasa Watanabe
61	16 May 1993	Japan PGA Championship (4)	−10 (68-73-67-70=278)	1 stroke	(Japan) Tsuyoshi Yoneyama
62	17 Oct 1993	Asahi Beer Golf Digest Tournament (2)	−16 (68-67-66-67=268)	2 strokes	(Japan) Tsuneyuki Nakajima
63	24 Apr 1994	Dunlop Open^{1} (4)	−14 (67-68-70-69=274)	1 stroke	(Taiwan) Hsieh Chin-sheng
64	10 Jul 1994	Yonex Open Hiroshima (6)	−14 (68-74-67-65=274)	3 strokes	(Japan) Nobuo Serizawa
65	18 Sep 1994	ANA Open (5)	−20 (68-68-63-69=268)	9 strokes	(Japan) Kiyoshi Murota
66	2 Oct 1994	Japan Open Golf Championship (5)	−18 (68-66-69-67=270)	13 strokes	(United States) David Ishii, (Japan) Hideki Kase
67	6 Nov 1994	Daiwa International	−18 (65-72-70-63=270)	15 strokes	(United States) Fuzzy Zoeller
68	13 Nov 1994	Sumitomo Visa Taiheiyo Masters (3)	−18 (66-69-68-67=270)	5 strokes	(United States) Bob Estes
69	20 Nov 1994	Dunlop Phoenix Tournament	−15 (67-69-65=201)	1 stroke	(United States) Tom Watson
70	30 Apr 1995	The Crowns (3)	−20 (66-64-63-67=260)	5 strokes	(Japan) Nobuo Serizawa
71	9 Jul 1995	Yonex Open Hiroshima (7)	−9 (73-68-66=207)	1 stroke	(Japan) Satoshi Higashi
72	17 Sep 1995	ANA Open (6)	−9 (70-72-69-68=279)	3 strokes	(South Africa) Ernie Els
73	19 Nov 1995	Dunlop Phoenix Tournament (2)	−11 (65-71-69-68=273)	1 stroke	(United States) Robert Gamez, (United States) Brandt Jobe, (Australia) Peter Senior
74	3 Dec 1995	Golf Nippon Series Hitachi Cup (4)	−16 (66-67-71-68=272)	2 strokes	(Japan) Shigenori Mori, (Japan) Tsuneyuki Nakajima
75	28 Apr 1996	The Crowns (4)	−12 (64-68-69-67=268)	4 strokes	(Japan) Katsuyoshi Tomori
76	12 May 1996	Japan PGA Championship (5)	−18 (68-66-67-69=270)	8 strokes	(Japan) Shigeki Maruyama
77	26 May 1996	Mitsubishi Galant Tournament	−9 (72-70-73-64=279)	Playoff	(United States) Todd Hamilton
78	2 Jun 1996	JCB Classic Sendai (5)	−7 (69-69-67-72=277)	Playoff	(United States) David Ishii
79	25 Aug 1996	Hisamitsu-KBC Augusta (2)	−15 (64-70-70-69=273)	Playoff	(Japan) Taichi Teshima
80	22 Sep 1996	Gene Sarazen Jun Classic (5)	−19 (68-64-65=197)	6 strokes	(Japan) Takaaki Fukuzawa
81	17 Nov 1996	Dunlop Phoenix Tournament (3)	−7 (68-67-69-73=277)	3 strokes	(Japan) Naomichi Ozaki, (United States) Tom Watson
82	1 Dec 1996	Golf Nippon Series Hitachi Cup (5)	−26 (62-68-65-67=262)	4 strokes	(Japan) Shigeki Maruyama
83	16 Mar 1997	Token Corporation Cup	−19 (71-65-61-72=269)	1 stroke	(Paraguay) Carlos Franco
84	4 May 1997	The Crowns (5)	−13 (67-67-66-67=267)	2 strokes	(United States) Brian Watts
85	1 Jun 1997	Mitsubishi Galant Tournament (2)	−10 (70-70-70-68=278)	2 strokes	(Japan) Satoshi Higashi, (Japan) Kōki Idoki, (Japan) Tōru Nakamura
86	31 Aug 1997	Hisamitsu-KBC Augusta (3)	−22 (65-67-67-67=266)	12 strokes	(Japan) Takaaki Fukuzawa, (Japan) Taichi Teshima
87	26 Oct 1997	Bridgestone Open (2)	−15 (66-70-71-66=273)	1 stroke	(Japan) Shigeki Maruyama, (Japan) Tateo Ozaki
88	12 Jul 1998	Yonex Open Hiroshima (8)	−18 (68-70-66-66=270)	1 stroke	(Australia) Peter McWhinney
89	30 Aug 1998	Hisamitsu-KBC Augusta (4)	−13 (66-72-65-72=275)	4 strokes	(Japan) Katsunori Kuwabara
90	1 Nov 1998	Philip Morris Championship	−13 (75-68-68-64=275)	1 stroke	(Japan) Mitsuo Harada, (Paraguay) Carlos Franco
91	14 Mar 1999	Token Corporation Cup (2)	−15 (72-65-69-67=273)	1 stroke	(Japan) Toru Taniguchi
92	11 Jul 1999	Yonex Open Hiroshima (9)	−15 (73-69-67-64=273)	Playoff	(Japan) Shigemasa Higaki
93	6 Aug 2000	Sun Chlorella Classic	−12 (74-68-66-68=276)	Playoff	(Japan) Shoichi Yamamoto
94	22 Sep 2002	ANA Open (7)	−17 (67-66-69-69=271)	1 stroke	(Japan) Hiroyuki Fujita

^{1}Co-sanctioned by the Asia Golf Circuit

Japan Golf Tour playoff record (12–9)

No.	Year	Tournament	Opponent(s)	Result
1	1973	Taiheiyo Club Masters	(United States) Bert Yancey	Won three-hole aggregate playoff; Ozaki: −1 (3-3-4=10), Yancey: +2 (4-5-4=13)
2	1974	ANA Sapporo Open	(Japan) Isao Aoki	Won with birdie on first extra hole
3	1978	Hiroshima Open	(Japan) Hideyo Sugimoto	Won with par on second extra hole
4	1979	Yomiuri Open	(Japan) Teruo Sugihara	Lost to birdie on second extra hole
5	1980	Toshiba Taiheiyo Masters	(Japan) Norio Suzuki	Lost after concession on first extra hole
6	1983	Acom Doubles (with (Japan) Hajime Meshiai)	(Taiwan) Lu Hsi-chuen and (Taiwan) Lu Liang-Huan	Lost to birdie on third extra hole
7	1983	Kanto Open	(Japan) Kikuo Arai, (Japan) Saburo Fujiki	Fujiki won with par on third extra hole Arai eliminated by par on first hole
8	1983	Gene Sarazen Jun Classic	(Japan) Masahiro Kuramoto	Won with par on first extra hole
9	1988	Polaroid Cup Golf Digest Tournament	(Australia) Brian Jones	Won with birdie on first extra hole
10	1991	Gene Sarazen Jun Classic	(Japan) Ryoken Kawagishi	Won with par on first extra hole
11	1992	Dunlop Open	(Canada) Brent Franklin	Won with birdie on first extra hole
12	1992	Gene Sarazen Jun Classic	(Taiwan) Chen Tze-chung	Lost to par on third extra hole
13	1996	Mitsubishi Galant Tournament	(United States) Todd Hamilton	Won with par on first extra hole
14	1996	JCB Classic Sendai	(United States) David Ishii	Won with par on first extra hole
15	1996	Hisamitsu-KBC Augusta	(Japan) Taichi Teshima	Won with par on second extra hole
16	1998	Japan PGA Championship	(United States) Brandt Jobe	Lost to par on first extra hole
17	1998	Golf Nippon Series JT Cup	(Japan) Katsumasa Miyamoto	Lost to birdie on fourth extra hole
18	1999	Yonex Open Hiroshima	(Japan) Shigemasa Higaki	Won with birdie on first extra hole
19	2000	Sun Chlorella Classic	(Japan) Shoichi Yamamoto	Won with birdie on first extra hole
20	2001	Juken Sangyo Open Hiroshima	(Japan) Keiichiro Fukabori	Lost to par on first extra hole
21	2003	Acom International	(Japan) Masahiro Kuramoto, (Japan) Katsumasa Miyamoto	Kuramoto won with birdie on first extra hole

=== Asia Golf Circuit wins (4) ===
No.	Date	Tournament	Winning score	Margin of victory	Runner(s)-up
1	27 Apr 1980	Dunlop International Open^{1}	−11 (68-70-69-70=277)	5 strokes	(Taiwan) Ho Ming-chung, (Australia) Graham Marsh
2	24 Apr 1988	Dunlop Open^{1} (2)	−10 (69-70-69-70=278)	3 strokes	(United States) David Ishii
3	26 Apr 1992	Dunlop Open^{1} (3)	−2 (69-76-72-69=286)	Playoff	(Canada) Brent Franklin
4	24 Apr 1994	Dunlop Open^{1} (4)	−14 (67-68-70-69=274)	1 stroke	(Taiwan) Hsieh Chin-sheng

^{1}Co-sanctioned by the PGA of Japan Tour

Asia Golf Circuit playoff record (1–1)

No.	Year	Tournament	Opponent	Result
1	1973	Sobu International Open	(Japan) Shigeru Uchida	Lost to eagle on third extra hole
2	1992	Dunlop Open	(Canada) Brent Franklin	Won with birdie on first extra hole

=== New Zealand Golf Circuit wins (1) ===
No.	Date	Tournament	Winning score	Margin of victory	Runners-up
1	8 Jan 1972	New Zealand PGA Championship	−15 (68-65-69-67=269)	7 strokes	(New Zealand) Bob Charles, (Japan) Takashi Murakami

=== Other Japan wins (18) ===
- 1971 (5) Japan PGA Championship, Nippon Series, Golf Digest Tournament, Miki Gold Cup (tie with Billy Casper), Setouchi Series Hiroshima leg
- 1972 (9) Wizard Tournament, Sapporo Open, Kanto Open, All Nippon Doubles, Nippon Series, Grand Monarch Tournament, First Flight Tournament, Chiba Open, Asahi International
- 1976 Chiba Open
- 1984 Kanagawa Open
- 1985 Kanagawa Open
- 1992 Sanko Grand Summer Tournament

=== Other wins (1) ===
No.	Date	Tournament	Winning score	Margin of victory	Runner-up
1	11 Feb 1990	Nissan Super Skins	$370,000	$110,000	(Australia) Greg Norman

== Results in major championships ==
Tournament	1972	1973	1974	1975	1976	1977	1978	1979
Masters Tournament	CUT	T8	CUT	T43	T33		CUT	CUT
U.S. Open								
The Open Championship							T14	T10
PGA Championship								

Tournament	1980	1981	1982	1983	1984	1985	1986	1987	1988	1989
Masters Tournament								CUT		T18
U.S. Open								T17	CUT	T6
The Open Championship	T60	T35						T11		T30
PGA Championship		CUT								

Tournament	1990	1991	1992	1993	1994	1995	1996	1997	1998	1999	2000
Masters Tournament	23	T35		T45	CUT	T29	CUT	42	CUT	CUT	T28
U.S. Open	T24	CUT	T23	T33	T28	T28	T67	CUT	CUT	CUT	
The Open Championship	CUT		CUT		T38	CUT					
PGA Championship	T69				T47	T49	CUT		CUT		78

Top 10
Did not play

CUT = missed the half-way cut
"T" indicates a tie for a place

=== Summary ===
Tournament	Wins	2nd	3rd	Top-5	Top-10	Top-25	Events	Cuts made
Masters Tournament	0	0	0	0	1	3	19	10
U.S. Open	0	0	0	0	1	4	13	8
The Open Championship	0	0	0	0	1	3	10	7
PGA Championship	0	0	0	0	0	0	7	4
Totals	0	0	0	0	3	10	49	29

- Most consecutive cuts made – 5 (twice)
- Longest streak of top-10s – 1 (three times)

== Results in The Players Championship ==
Tournament	1989	1990	1991	1992	1993	1994	1995	1996	1997	1998
The Players Championship	T45	CUT	T27		WD	82	T29	T29	T50	CUT

Did not play

CUT = missed the halfway cut
WD = withdrew
"T" indicates a tie for a place

== Team appearances ==
This list may be incomplete.

- World Cup (representing Japan): 1974, 1988
- Four Tours World Championship: (representing Japan) 1986 (winners), 1987, 1989
- Presidents Cup (International team): 1996

== See also ==
- List of golfers with most Japan Golf Tour wins
- Jumbo Ozaki no Hole In One - Famicom and Super Famicom video game
