= Wakita =

Wakita may refer to:

- Wakita (surname)
- Wakita, Oklahoma, town in Grant County, Oklahoma, United States
