= Yasuhiro Miyamoto =

Japanese professional golfer (born 1948)

Personal information
- Nationality: Japan
- Born: 30 November 1948 (age 77) Osaka Prefecture, Japan
- Height: 1.73 m (5 ft 8 in)
- Weight: 75 kg (165 lb; 11.8 st)

Career
- Sport: Golf
- Status: Professional
- Current tour: Japan Golf Tour
- Professional wins: 9

Number of wins by tour
- Japan Golf Tour: 8
- Other: 1

Yasuhiro Miyamoto (born 30 November 1948) is a Japanese professional golfer.

== Career ==
Miyamoto competed on the Japan Golf Tour, securing victory in eight tournaments.

== Professional wins (9) ==
=== PGA of Japan Tour wins (8) ===
No.	Date	Tournament	Winning score	Margin of victory	Runner(s)-up
1	9 Dec 1973	ANA Phoenix Tournament	E (72-74-71-71=288)	1 stroke	(Japan) Kazuo Yoshikawa
2	27 Jul 1975	Sports Shinko International	−8 (69-68-73-70=280)	2 strokes	(Japan) Tōru Nakamura
3	26 Oct 1975	Tokai Classic	−8 (71-72-67-70=280)	2 strokes	(Japan) Kikuo Arai, (Japan) Yoshitaka Yamamoto
4	22 May 1977	Fujisankei Classic	−1 (75-70-72-70=287)	1 stroke	(Japan) Yoshitaka Yamamoto
5	19 Jun 1977	Sapporo Tokyu Open	−5 (68-70-74-71=283)	2 strokes	(Japan) Tsuneyuki Nakajima
6	4 Sep 1977	Hiroshima Open	−13 (67-67-70-71=275)	1 stroke	(Japan) Masashi Ozaki
7	17 Jun 1979	Sapporo Tokyu Open (2)	−8 (69-67-71-73=280)	2 strokes	(Japan) Teruo Sugihara
8	23 Sep 1979	Kansai Open	−5 (70-74-72-67=283)	1 stroke	(Japan) Tōru Nakamura

PGA of Japan Tour playoff record (0–2)

No.	Year	Tournament	Opponent	Result
1	1977	Shizuoka Open	(Taiwan) Lu Liang-Huan	
2	1978	Kansai Open	(Japan) Akio Kanemoto	Lost to par on second extra hole

=== Senior wins (1) ===
- 2001 Japan PGA Senior Championship
