= Mizuno Open =

Gateway to The Open Mizuno Open
Tournament information
- Location: Kasaoka, Okayama, Japan
- Established: 1971
- Course: JFE Setonaikai Golf Club
- Par: 72
- Length: 7,461 yards (6,822 m)
- Tour: Japan Golf Tour
- Format: Stroke play
- Prize fund: ¥100,000,000
- Month played: May

Tournament record score
- Aggregate: 264 Shaun Norris (2026)
- To par: −24 as above

Current champion
- (South Africa) Shaun Norris

Final champion
- Location in Japan Location in the Okayama Prefecture

The Mizuno Open (ミズノオープン, Mizuno ōpun) is a professional golf tournament played in Japan. Founded in 1971, it has been a Japan Golf Tour event since 1979. Since 1998, the event has been prefixed Gateway to The Open (全英への道, Zen'ei eno michi), with the top finishers gaining exemptions into The Open Championship.

The Mizuno Open has been held at several courses, most frequently at JFE Setonaikai Golf Club in Kasaoka, Okayama, which has hosted all but six renewals since 1998. The purse for the 2024 event was ¥100,000,000, with ¥20,000,000 going to the winner.

== History ==
The Mizuno Open was founded in 1971 as the Mizuno Tournament with both men's and women's events running side-by-side. It was restricted to golfers using at least ten Mizuno clubs. In 1979, fifty leading professionals in Japan were also eligible to compete as the tournament counted towards the Japan Golf Tour money-list ranking for the first time. In 1983 it became a full tour event and in 1985 changed its name to the Mizuno Open. From 1991, the women's event was played separately.

Since 1998, the event has been prefixed "Gateway to The Open", with the top four finishers in the tournament that were not already qualified gaining exemptions into The Open Championship. There has also been a mini-money list of Japan Golf Tour events up to and including the Mizuno Open that earns two exemptions into The Open. From 2007 to 2010 The Mizuno Open merged with the Yomiuri Open to form the Gateway to The Open Mizuno Open Yomiuri Classic.

== Tournament hosts ==
Years	Venue	Location
1998–2006, 2011–2017, 2021–2025	Setonaikai Golf Club	Kasaoka, Okayama
2018–2019	The Royal Golf Club	Hokota, Ibaraki
2007–2010	Yomiuri Country Club	Nishinomiya, Hyōgo
1976–1997	Tokinodai Country Club	Hakui, Ishikawa
1971–1975	Anegasaki Country Club	Ichihara, Chiba

== Winners ==
Year	Winner	Score	To Par	Margin of victory	Runner(s)-up	Ref.
Gateway to The Open Mizuno Open
2026	(South Africa) Shaun Norris	264	−24	5 strokes	(Japan) Ryutaro Nagano (Japan) Ren Yonezawa	
2025	(Japan) Mikiya Akutsu	275	−13	4 strokes	(Japan) Riki Kawamoto (South Korea) Song Young-han	
2024	(Japan) Ryosuke Kinoshita	276	−12	2 strokes	(South Korea) Koh Gun-taek	
2023	(Japan) Kensei Hirata	271	−17	Playoff	(Japan) Keita Nakajima	
2022	(Zimbabwe) Scott Vincent	276	−12	Playoff	(Australia) Anthony Quayle	
2021	(Philippines) Juvic Pagunsan	199 (Note: Shortened to 54 holes due to rain.)	−17	3 strokes	(Japan) Ryutaro Nagano	
2020	Cancelled due to the COVID-19 pandemic					
2019	(Japan) Yuta Ikeda	281	−7	1 stroke	(United States) Chan Kim	
2018	(Japan) Shota Akiyoshi	287	−1	1 stroke	(New Zealand) Michael Hendry (Japan) Masahiro Kawamura (Japan) Masanori Kobayashi	
2017	(United States) Chan Kim	273	−15	5 strokes	(New Zealand) Michael Hendry	
2016	(South Korea) Kim Kyung-tae	277	−11	1 stroke	(Japan) Kodai Ichihara (Japan) Shugo Imahira (South Korea) Lee Sang-hee	
2015	(Japan) Taichi Teshima	273	−15	2 strokes	(Australia) Scott Strange	
2014	(South Korea) Jang Dong-kyu	273	−15	3 strokes	(Philippines) Juvic Pagunsan	
2013	(Australia) Brendan Jones (2)	269	−19	3 strokes	(South Korea) Kim Kyung-tae	
2012	(Australia) Brad Kennedy	271	−17	3 strokes	(Japan) Toshinori Muto (Japan) Toru Taniguchi	
2011	(South Korea) Hwang Jung-gon	275	−13	1 stroke	(South Korea) Kim Kyung-tae	
Gateway to The Open Mizuno Open Yomiuri Classic
2010	(Japan) Shunsuke Sonoda	201	−15	3 strokes	(Japan) Toru Taniguchi	
2009	(Japan) Ryo Ishikawa	275	−13	3 strokes	(New Zealand) David Smail	
2008	(Thailand) Prayad Marksaeng	269	−15	1 stroke	(Japan) Azuma Yano	
2007	(South Korea) Lee Dong-hwan	204 (Note: Shortened to 54 holes due to fog.)	−12	4 strokes	(South Korea) Lee Seong-ho (Taiwan) Lin Keng-chi (Japan) Toshinori Muto (Japan) Achi Sato (Japan) Hideto Tanihara (Japan) Masaya Tomida	
Gateway to The Open Mizuno Open
2006	(South Korea) Hur Suk-ho	274	−14	3 strokes	(Japan) Tatsuhiko Ichihara (New Zealand) David Smail	
2005	(Australia) Chris Campbell	278	−10	Playoff	(New Zealand) David Smail (Japan) Tadahiro Takayama	
2004	(Australia) Brendan Jones	274	−14	Playoff	(Japan) Hiroaki Iijima	
2003	(United States) Todd Hamilton	278	−10	1 stroke	(Australia) Brendan Jones	
2002	(United States) Dean Wilson	277	−11	1 stroke	(Japan) Kiyoshi Miyazato	
2001	(Japan) Hidemichi Tanaka	272	−16	3 strokes	(Colombia) Eduardo Herrera	
2000	(Japan) Yasuharu Imano	274	−14	1 stroke	(Japan) Toshimitsu Izawa (Japan) Katsumasa Miyamoto	
1999	(Colombia) Eduardo Herrera	274	−14	2 strokes	(Japan) Tsukasa Watanabe	
1998	(United States) Brandt Jobe	275	−13	4 strokes	(Japan) Yoshi Mizumaki (Japan) Toru Suzuki	
Mizuno Open
1997	(United States) Brian Watts (3)	278	−10	2 strokes	(Japan) Toshimitsu Izawa	
1996	(Japan) Yoshinori Kaneko	270	−18	4 strokes	(Japan) Shinichi Yokota	
1995	(United States) Brian Watts (2)	273	−15	3 strokes	(Canada) Rick Gibson	
1994	(United States) Brian Watts	280	−8	Playoff	(Colombia) Eduardo Herrera (Japan) Yoshinori Kaneko (Japan) Koichi Suzuki	
1993	(Japan) Seiki Okuda	280	−8	1 stroke	(Australia) Wayne Grady (Japan) Tateo Ozaki (Japan) Teruo Sugihara	
1992	(Japan) Tōru Nakamura	282	−6	1 stroke	(Japan) Saburo Fujiki (Australia) Brian Jones	
1991	(Australia) Roger Mackay	207	−9	Playoff	(Japan) Satoshi Higashi	
1990	(Australia) Brian Jones	272	−16	4 strokes	(Japan) Tsuneyuki Nakajima	
1989	(Japan) Akiyoshi Ohmachi	283	−5	2 strokes	(Australia) Brian Jones (Japan) Fujio Kobayashi (Japan) Masahiro Kuramoto (Japan) Tsuneyuki Nakajima	
1988	(Japan) Yoshimi Niizeki	280	−8	Playoff	(Japan) Seiichi Kanai	
1987	(United States) David Ishii	272	−16	8 strokes	(Taiwan) Chen Tze-ming (Japan) Tōru Nakamura	
1986	(Japan) Tsuneyuki Nakajima	239 (Note: Shortened to 63 holes due to rain.)	−11	6 strokes	(Japan) Tsukasa Watanabe	
1985	(Japan) Tateo Ozaki (Japan) Katsunari Takahashi	205	−11	Title shared		
Mizuno Tournament
1984	(Japan) Kikuo Arai (2)	279	−9	1 stroke	(Japan) Naomichi Ozaki	
1983	(Japan) Eitaro Deguchi	277	−11	3 strokes	(Taiwan) Hsieh Min-Nan (Japan) Tsuneyuki Nakajima (Japan) Shigeru Uchida	
1982	(Japan) Teruo Sugihara	282	−6			
1981	(Japan) Kikuo Arai	274	−12	2 strokes	(Japan) Shigeru Uchida	
1980	(Japan) Norio Suzuki	266	−20	6 strokes	(Japan) Yoshikazu Yokoshima	
1979	(Japan) Mitsuhiro Kitta	272	−16	2 strokes	(Japan) Teruo Sugihara (Japan) Ichiro Teramoto	
1978	(Japan) Akio Kanemoto	276	−12	1 stroke	(Japan) Shigeru Uchida	
1977	(Japan) Masaji Kusakabe (2)	283	−5	Playoff	(Japan) Shigeru Uchida	
1976	(Japan) Masaji Kusakabe	215	−6	2 strokes	(South Korea) Han Chang-sang (Japan) Shigeru Uchida (Japan) Takemitsu Uranishi (Japan) Yuki Watanabe	
1975	(Japan) Shigeru Uchida (2)	215	−1	3 strokes	(Japan) Takashi Aoki	
1974	(Japan) Shigeru Uchida	210	−6	1 stroke	(Japan) Shichiro Enomoto	
1973	(Japan) Shichiro Enomoto	208	−8	3 strokes	(Japan) Akio Kanemoto	
1972	(Japan) Kazuo Yoshikawa					
1971	(Japan) Makoto Yamaguchi	214	−2	2 strokes	(Japan) Shichiro Enomoto	
