= Mitsuhiro Kitta =

Japanese professional golfer

Personal information
- Nationality: Japan
- Born: 3 July 1942 (age 84) Hyōgo Prefecture, Japan
- Height: 1.73 m (5 ft 8 in)
- Weight: 59 kg (130 lb; 9.3 st)

Career
- Sport: Golf
- Status: Professional
- Former tour: Japan Golf Tour
- Professional wins: 4

Number of wins by tour
- Japan Golf Tour: 1
- Other: 3

Mitsuhiro Kitta (橘田 光弘, Kitta Mitsuhiro) (born 3 July 1942) is a Japanese professional golfer.

== Career ==
Kitta played on the Japan Golf Tour, winning once. He also won the Japan Open before the establishment of the Tour.

== Professional wins (4) ==
=== PGA of Japan Tour wins (1) ===
No.	Date	Tournament	Winning score	Margin of victory	Runners-up
1	12 Aug 1979	Mizuno Tournament	−16 (67-70-68-67=272)	2 strokes	(Japan) Teruo Sugihara, (Japan) Ichiro Teramoto

=== Other wins (3) ===
- 1970 Japan Open Golf Championship
- 1979 Hyogo Prefecture Open
- 1980 Hyogo Prefecture Open
