= Shizuoka Open =

Dydo Drinco Shizuoka Open
Tournament information
- Location: Omaezaki, Shizuoka, Japan
- Established: 1972
- Courses: Shizuoka Country Club (Hamaoka Course)
- Par: 72
- Length: 6,918 yards (6,326 m)
- Tour: Japan Golf Tour
- Format: Stroke play
- Prize fund: ¥100,000,000
- Month played: March
- Final year: 2002

Tournament record score
- Aggregate: 274 Hisayuki Sasaki (1997); 274 Hidemichi Tanaka (2000)
- To par: −14 as above

Final champion
- (Japan) Kiyoshi Murota
- Location in Japan Location in the Shizuoka Prefecture

The Shizuoka Open was a professional golf tournament that was held in Japan. Founded in 1972, it was an event on the Japan Golf Tour from 1974. It was last played in 2002 having been dropped from the 2003 tour schedule for financial reasons. It was played over the Hamaoka Course at Shizuoka Country Club near Omaezaki in Shizuoka Prefecture.

== Winners ==
Year	Winner	Score	To par	Margin of victory	Runner(s)-up	Ref.
Dydo Drinco Shizuoka Open
2002	(Japan) Kiyoshi Murota	276	−12	2 strokes	(South Korea) Kim Jong-duck (Japan) Masashi Ozaki	
2001	(Japan) Eiji Mizoguchi	279	−9	Playoff	(Philippines) Frankie Miñoza	
2000	(Japan) Hidemichi Tanaka	274	−14	2 strokes	(Japan) Eiji Mizoguchi	
1999	(South Korea) Kim Jong-duck	277	−11	1 stroke	(Japan) Shusaku Sugimoto	
1998	(Colombia) Eduardo Herrera	203 (Note: Shortened to 54 holes due to weather.)	−13	1 stroke	(Japan) Kaname Yokoo	
1997	(Japan) Hisayuki Sasaki	274	−14	3 strokes	(Paraguay) Carlos Franco	
1996	(Japan) Yoshikazu Sakamoto	211	−5	Playoff	(Paraguay) Carlos Franco (Japan) Nobuo Serizawa	
1995	(United States) Brian Watts	280	−8	2 strokes	(Japan) Shigeki Maruyama	
Dydo Shizuoka Open
1994	(Japan) Tsuneyuki Nakajima (2)	280	−8	Playoff	(Japan) Tōru Nakamura	
1993	(United States) David Ishii	275	−13	3 strokes	(Japan) Hajime Meshiai	
1992	(Japan) Hiroshi Makino	276	−12	1 stroke	(Japan) Isao Aoki	
1991	(Japan) Yutaka Hagawa	278	−10	1 stroke	(Japan) Noburo Sugai	
Shizuoka Open
1990	(Japan) Ryoken Kawagishi	280	−8	2 strokes	(Japan) Hiroshi Makino	
1989	(Japan) Koichi Suzuki	285	−3	1 stroke	(Japan) Naomichi Ozaki (Japan) Nobumitsu Yuhara	
1988	(Japan) Toshimitsu Kai	283	−5	Playoff	(Japan) Tomohiro Maruyama	
1987	(Taiwan) Lu Liang-Huan (2)	280	−8	2 strokes	(Japan) Nobumitsu Yuhara	
1986	(Japan) Akiyoshi Ohmachi	254 (Note: Shortened to 63 holes due to weather.)	+2	Playoff	(Japan) Teruo Sugihara	
1985	(Japan) Seiichi Kanai	284	−4	1 stroke	(Japan) Isao Aoki (Japan) Tomishege Ikeda (Japan) Tōru Nakamura	
1984	(Japan) Naomichi Ozaki	286	−2	5 strokes	(Japan) Eitaro Deguchi (Japan) Yoshitaka Yamamoto	
1983	(Japan) Tsuneyuki Nakajima	283	−5	4 strokes	(Japan) Takashi Kurihara (Japan) Masaji Kusakabe	
1982	(Japan) Eitaro Deguchi	280	−6	2 strokes	(Japan) Nobumitsu Yuhara	
1981	(Japan) Isao Aoki	279	−9	Playoff	(Japan) Akira Yabe	
1980	(Japan) Katsuji Hasegawa	283	−5	1 stroke	(Japan) Shinsaku Maeda	
1979	(Japan) Akira Yabe	217	+1	2 strokes	(Japan) Kikuo Arai (Japan) Shigeru Nonaka	
1978	(Taiwan) Hsieh Min-Nan	280	−8	3 strokes	(Japan) Isao Aoki	
1977	(Taiwan) Lu Liang-Huan	283	−5	Playoff	(Japan) Yasuhiro Miyamoto	
1976	(Japan) Norio Suzuki	277	−11	1 stroke	(Taiwan) Lu Liang-Huan	
1975	(Myanmar) Mya Aye	276	−12	2 strokes	(Japan) Kenji Mori	
1974	(Japan) Takashi Kurihara	287	−1	7 strokes	(Japan) Seiichi Kanai (Japan) unknown (Japan) unknown (Japan) unknown	
1973	(Japan) Sadao Sakashita					
1972	(Japan) Haruo Yasuda	141	-3	1 stroke	(Japan) Isao Aoki	
