= Hiraishi =

Hiraishi (written: 平石) is a Japanese surname. Notable people with the surname include:

- Naoto Hiraishi (平石 直人, born 1992), Japanese footballer
- Takenori Hiraishi, Japanese golfer
- Yosuke Hiraishi (平石 洋介, born 1980), Japanese baseball player
