= Eduardo Herrera (golfer) =

Colombian professional golfer (born 1965)

Personal information
- Nationality: Colombia
- Born: 28 April 1965 (age 61) Colombia
- Height: 5 ft 11 in (1.80 m)
- Weight: 172 lb (78 kg; 12.3 st)

Career
- Sport: Golf
- College: Brigham Young University
- Turned professional: 1989
- Former tours: Japan Golf Tour; Nationwide Tour; PGA Tour; Asian Tour
- Professional wins: 9
- Highest ranking: 85 (31 May 1998)

Number of wins by tour
- Japan Golf Tour: 5
- Other: 4

Best results in major championships
- Masters Tournament: DNP
- PGA Championship: DNP
- U.S. Open: DNP
- The Open Championship: T58: 1995

Eduardo Herrera (born 28 April 1965) is a Colombian professional golfer. Herrera was the first Colombian golfer to feature in the top 100 of the Official World Golf Rankings.

== Amateur career ==
Herrera represented Colombia in the Eisenhower Cup in 1986 and although his team did not win, he had the best 72-hole score out of all the competitors in a field that included Jesper Parnevik, Colin Montgomerie, Jay Sigel, Billy Andrade, Peter McEvoy, Jean van de Velde and Peter O'Malley.

== Professional career ==
Herrera played on the Japan Golf Tour from 1988 until 2001 where he won 5 tournaments. He played on the PGA Tour in 2002 after earning his card through qualifying school in 2001. Herrera only made 7 of 23 cuts in 2002 and was not able to retain his tour card. He earned $109,953 and finished in 196th on the money list. His best finish came at the B.C. Open where he finished in 8th. He dropped down to the second tier Nationwide Tour from 2003 to 2005. While on the Nationwide Tour, Herrera made 28 of 48 cuts, recorded three top-10 finishes, 10 top-25 finishes and earned $133,444. His best finish on the money list came in 2003 when he finished in 70th. Herrera finished in 3rd place at the 2008 Asian Tour qualifying school to earn his Asian Tour card for 2009.

== Professional wins (9) ==
=== Japan Golf Tour wins (5) ===
No.	Date	Tournament	Winning score	Margin of victory	Runner-up
1	18 Jun 1995	Pocari Sweat Yomiuri Open	−12 (70-67-68-67=272)	1 stroke	(Japan) Hiroyuki Fujita
2	8 Dec 1996	Daikyo Open	−12 (67-69-68-68=272)	5 strokes	(Japan) Katsunori Kuwabara
3	28 Sep 1997	Gene Sarazen Jun Classic	−12 (71-66-69-70=276)	1 stroke	(Japan) Toshiaki Odate
4	22 Mar 1998	Dydo Drinco Shizuoka Open	−13 (66-69-68=203) (Note: Shortened to 54 holes due to weather.)	1 stroke	(Japan) Kaname Yokoo
5	27 Jun 1999	Gateway to The Open Mizuno Open	−14 (66-69-69-70=274)	2 strokes	(Japan) Tsukasa Watanabe

Japan Golf Tour playoff record (0–2)

No.	Year	Tournament	Opponent(s)	Result
1	1994	Mizuno Open	(Japan) Yoshinori Kaneko, (Japan) Koichi Suzuki, (United States) Brian Watts	Watts won with birdie on first extra hole
2	1997	Acom International	(Japan) Kazuo Kanayama	Lost to birdie on second extra hole

=== Tour de las Américas wins (2) ===
No.	Date	Tournament	Winning score	Margin of victory	Runner(s)-up
1	14 Dec 2003	Mexican Open	−10 (69-68-71-70=278)	1 stroke	(Argentina) Eduardo Argiró, (United States) Jeff Burns
2	26 Apr 2009	Televisa TLA Players Championship	−16 (69-64-67=200)	Playoff	(Colombia) Jaime Clavijo

=== Japan Challenge Tour wins (1) ===
- 1989 Korakuen Cup (2nd)

=== Other wins (1) ===
- 2008 Mercedes Championship (Brazil)

== Results in major championships ==
Tournament	1994	1995	1996	1997	1998	1999
The Open Championship	CUT	T58				CUT

Note: Herrera only played in The Open Championship.

Did not play

CUT = missed the half-way cut
"T" = tied

== Colombian national team appearances ==
Amateur

- Eisenhower Trophy: 1986 (individual leader)

Professional

- World Cup: 1988, 1989, 2005

== See also ==
- 2001 PGA Tour Qualifying School graduates
