= Brian Watts =

American professional golfer (born 1966)

Personal information
- Full name: Brian Peter Watts
- Nationality: Canada; United States
- Born: March 18, 1966 (age 60) Montreal, Quebec, Canada
- Height: 188 cm (6 ft 2 in)
- Weight: 95 kg (209 lb; 15.0 st)
- Children: 3

Career
- Sport: Golf
- College: Oklahoma State University
- Turned professional: 1988
- Former tours: PGA Tour; Japan Golf Tour; Asia Golf Circuit; Ben Hogan Tour
- Professional wins: 13
- Highest ranking: 18 (January 3, 1999)

Number of wins by tour
- Japan Golf Tour: 12
- Other: 1

Best results in major championships
- Masters Tournament: T31: 1999
- PGA Championship: T41: 1999
- U.S. Open: T23: 1999
- The Open Championship: 2nd: 1998

Achievements and awards
- Asia Golf Circuit Order of Merit winner: 1993

Brian Peter Watts (born March 18, 1966) is an American professional golfer.

== Early life and amateur career ==
Watts was born in Montreal, Quebec, Canada to European parents, but is now a U.S. citizen who lives in Texas. He played college golf at Oklahoma State and won the NCAA Division I Championship in 1987 and was a member of the team that won the 1987 NCAA Division I Team Championship. He also won the 1986 Big 8 Conference Championship and the 1985 and 1987 Morris Williams Intercollegiate (tied Ben Crenshaw's scoring record in '85) as part of his 7 collegiate wins. Only Lindy Miller, Scott Verplank and Willie Wood have more college wins in OSU's long successful golf history. Watts was a four-time All-American (two-time first team and two-time second team) and a 1987 runner-up for the Fred Haskins award. Only Watts and Tom Jones are credited for never shooting a score in the 80s while at OSU. Watts won the 1984 Texas State 5A High School Championship and added the prestigious A.J.G.A. Player of the Year honors later that year. After being honored as the 1984 AJGA Player of the Year, Watts won the AJGA Polo Golf Junior Classic the same week. Watts partnered with John Daly to win the 1984 AJGA Future Legends of Golf as well. In 1983, Watts added two more AJGA championships to his record by winning the AJGA Oklahoma Junior Classic & AJGA Holiday Junior Classic. As a 15 year old, once shot a 59 (−13) at his home course Brookhaven C.C. Presidents Course.

== Professional career ==
Watts turned professional in 1988. During the 1990s, he played mainly on the Japan Golf Tour, having gained his card via the Asia Golf Circuit, where he topped the Order of Merit in 1993. During his six seasons on the Japan Golf Tour from 1993 to 1998 he had 12 tournament victories and 12 runner-up finishes, amassing 63 top-10s in 124 events. When he left the tour he was the second all-time foreign money leader (593 million yen) to David Ishii. Only foreign players to have won more events were Ishii and Graham Marsh when Watts left for the PGA Tour in late 1998. His biggest victories in Japan were the 1994 Bridgestone Open where he defeated then World Number 1 Nick Price on the final day and the 1998 Casio World Open where then World Number 1 Tiger Woods was making his Japan Golf Tour debut. His first professional win was at the 1993 Hong Kong Open. However, he is best known for his performance at The Open Championship at Royal Birkdale in 1998, where he lost in the playoff to Mark O'Meara. He had a two stroke lead entering the final round and shot 70. On the 72nd hole Watts faced a bunker shot where his right leg was out of the bunker and he nearly holed it from 45 feet. After making the 1 foot par putt on the final hole Watts failed to make two short birdie putts on the first two playoff holes and ended up losing by two shots in the four hole playoff. This performance helped earn Watts a PGA Tour card and by the end of the year he reached the top 20 of the Official World Golf Ranking.

In a successful 1999 season on the PGA Tour he finished 57th on the money list, including 26th in scoring average. He was one of a handful of players to make the cut in all four major championships and the Players Championship but his career was ended soon afterwards due to injuries.

Following a number of poor seasons, Watts has played little competitive golf since 2005 while rehabilitating from hip, knee, foot, and back injuries.

== Amateur wins ==
this list may be incomplete

- 1986 Trans-Mississippi Amateur, LaJet National Amateur
- 1987 NCAA Division I Championship

== Professional wins (13) ==
=== PGA of Japan Tour wins (12) ===
No.	Date	Tournament	Winning score	Margin of victory	Runner(s)-up
1	Apr 3, 1994	Descente Classic	−8 (67-71-69-73=280)	3 strokes	(Japan) Hisao Inoue, (Japan) Hideki Kase, (Philippines) Frankie Miñoza, (Japan) Tsukasa Watanabe
2	Jun 26, 1994	Mizuno Open	−8 (68-68-73-71=280)	Playoff	(Colombia) Eduardo Herrera, (Japan) Yoshinori Kaneko, (Japan) Koichi Suzuki
3	Aug 28, 1994	Hisamitsu-KBC Augusta	−17 (66-67-71-67=271)	2 strokes	(Japan) Masashi Ozaki
4	Oct 23, 1994	Bridgestone Open	−14 (68-67-67-72=274)	3 strokes	(United States) Mark Calcavecchia
5	Oct 30, 1994	Philip Morris Championship	−12 (71-66-71-68=276)	1 stroke	(Japan) Masashi Ozaki, (Japan) Naomichi Ozaki, (United States) Duffy Waldorf
6	Mar 19, 1995	Dydo Drinco Shizuoka Open	−8 (69-72-71-68=280)	2 strokes	(Japan) Shigeki Maruyama
7	Jun 25, 1995	Mizuno Open (2)	−15 (71-65-66-71=273)	3 strokes	(Canada) Rick Gibson
8	May 5, 1996	Fujisankei Classic	−12 (66-67-71-68=272)	Playoff	(United States) Todd Hamilton
9	Jun 29, 1997	Mizuno Open (3)	−10 (69-69-71-69=278)	2 strokes	(Japan) Toshimitsu Izawa
10	Nov 2, 1997	Philip Morris Championship (2)	−8 (70-73-67-70=280)	2 strokes	(Japan) Kaname Yokoo
11	Jun 21, 1998	Yomiuri Open	−10 (66-68=134) (Note: Shortened to 36 holes due to weather.)	1 stroke	(Japan) Kaname Yokoo
12	Nov 29, 1998	Casio World Open	−14 (69-70-67-68=274)	Playoff	(Japan) Toshimitsu Izawa

PGA of Japan Tour playoff record (3–2)

No.	Year	Tournament	Opponent(s)	Result
1	1994	Mizuno Open	(Colombia) Eduardo Herrera, (Japan) Yoshinori Kaneko, (Japan) Koichi Suzuki	Won with birdie on first extra hole
2	1995	PGA Philanthropy Tournament	(Japan) Katsunari Takahashi, (Japan) Kazuhiro Takami	Takami won with birdie on first extra hole
3	1996	Fujisankei Classic	(United States) Todd Hamilton	Won with par on second extra hole
4	1997	Tokai Classic	(United States) Brandt Jobe	Lost to birdie on first extra hole
5	1998	Casio World Open	(Japan) Toshimitsu Izawa	Won with birdie on second extra hole

=== Asia Golf Circuit wins (1) ===
No.	Date	Tournament	Winning score	Margin of victory	Runner-up
1	Feb 14, 1993	Kent Hong Kong Open	−10 (63-69-68-74=274)	1 stroke	(Taiwan) Chen Tze-chung

== Playoff record ==
PGA Tour playoff record (0–1)

No.	Year	Tournament	Opponent	Result
1	1998	The Open Championship	(United States) Mark O'Meara	Lost four-hole aggregate playoff; O'Meara: −1 (4-4-5-4=17), Watts: +1 (5-4-5-5=19)

== Results in major championships ==
Tournament	1986	1987	1988	1989	1990	1991	1992	1993	1994	1995	1996	1997	1998	1999	2000
Masters Tournament														T31	CUT
U.S. Open	CUT													T23	
The Open Championship								CUT	T55	T40	CUT	CUT	2	T24	
PGA Championship										CUT	T47	CUT	T56	T41	T51

Top 10
Did not play

CUT = missed the half-way cut
"T" = tied

=== Summary ===
Tournament	Wins	2nd	3rd	Top-5	Top-10	Top-25	Events	Cuts made
Masters Tournament	0	0	0	0	0	0	2	1
U.S. Open	0	0	0	0	0	1	2	1
The Open Championship	0	1	0	1	1	2	7	4
PGA Championship	0	0	0	0	0	0	6	4
Totals	0	1	0	1	1	3	17	10

- Most consecutive cuts made – 6 (1998 Open Championship – 1999 PGA)
- Longest streak of top-10s – 1

== Results in The Players Championship ==
Tournament	1997	1998	1999	2000	2001	2002
The Players Championship	T37		T38	T73		CUT

Did not play

CUT = missed the halfway cut
"T" indicates a tie for a place

== Results in World Golf Championships ==
Tournament	1999	2000
Match Play	R64	R64
Championship	T55	
Invitational		

Did not play

QF, R16, R32, R64 = Round in which player lost in match play
"T" = Tied

== See also ==
- 1990 PGA Tour Qualifying School graduates
- 2002 PGA Tour Qualifying School graduates
- List of golfers with most Japan Golf Tour wins
