= Kansai Open =

Kansai Open Golf Championship
Tournament information
- Location: Higashiomi, Shiga Prefecture, Japan
- Established: 1926
- Course: Hino Golf Club
- Par: 71
- Length: 7,180 yards (6,570 m)
- Tour: Japan Golf Tour
- Format: Stroke play
- Prize fund: ¥80,000,000
- Month played: May

Tournament record score
- Aggregate: 264 Hiroyuki Fujita (2009)
- To par: −20 as above

Current champion
- (Japan) Yoshinori Fujimoto

Final champion
- Location in Japan Location in the Shiga Prefecture

The Kansai Open Golf Championship (関西オープンゴルフ選手権競技, Kansai ōpun gorufu sensyuken kyōgi) is a professional golf tournament held in the Kansai region of Japan. Founded in 1926, one year before the Japan Open Golf Championship, it was the first professional tournament to be organised in Japan. It was an event on the Japan Golf Tour from 1973 to 1991 and has been back on the tour schedule since 2009. The 2019 event was the 85th edition.

== Winners ==
Year	Winner	Score	To par	Margin of victory	Runner(s)-up	Venue	Ref.
2026	(Japan) Yoshinori Fujimoto	271	−9	3 strokes	(Japan) Takanori Konishi (Japan) Yujiro Ohori	Ibaraki	
2025	(Japan) Kota Kaneko	265	−15	1 stroke	(Japan) Yosuke Asaji (South Korea) Ryu Hyun-woo	Hino	
2024	(Japan) Takahiro Hataji	266	−14	3 strokes	(Japan) Yuta Sugiura	Meishin Yokaichi	
2023	(Japan) Taiga Semikawa	267	−17	4 strokes	(Japan) Takahiro Hataji	Izumigaoka	
2022	(Japan) Kazuki Higa	270	−14	1 stroke	(Japan) Rikuya Hoshino	Yomiuri	
2021	(Japan) Rikuya Hoshino	270	−14	2 strokes	(United States) Chan Kim	Arima Royal (Royal)	
2020	Cancelled due to the COVID-19 pandemic					Arima Royal (Royal)	
2019	(Japan) Tomoharu Otsuki	269	−19	Playoff	(Japan) Rikuya Hoshino	Koma	
2018	(Japan) Ryuko Tokimatsu	278	−10	1 stroke	(Japan) Shugo Imahira (Japan) Kunihiro Kamii	Ono Toyo	
2017	(Japan) Shugo Imahira	275	−9	6 strokes	(Japan) Daisuke Kataoka	Joyo	
2016	(South Korea) Cho Byung-min	278	−6	1 stroke	(Japan) Tomohiro Kondo (Australia) Scott Strange	Hashimoto	
2015	(Japan) Daisuke Kataoka	267	−17	3 strokes	(Australia) Brad Kennedy	Meishin Youkaichi	
2014	(Japan) Koumei Oda	273	−15	2 strokes	(Japan) Yoshinori Fujimoto	Rokko	
2013	(Australia) Brad Kennedy	206 (Note: Shortened to 54 holes due to weather.)	−10	1 stroke	(South Korea) Park Sung-joon	Olympic	
2012	(Japan) Toshinori Muto	266	−18	1 stroke	(South Korea) Kim Hyung-sung	Izumigaoka	
2011	(South Korea) Cho Min-gyu	270	−14	4 strokes	(Japan) Yoshikazu Haku	Ono	
2010	(Japan) Shigeru Nonaka	269	−11	3 strokes	(Japan) Azuma Yano	Tanabe	
2009	(Japan) Hiroyuki Fujita	264	−20	2 strokes	(Japan) Tetsuji Hiratsuka (Japan) Tomohiro Kondo	Takarazuka (New)	
2008	(Japan) Ryo Ishikawa	276	−12	4 strokes	(Japan) Yuta Ikeda	Shiga	
2007	(Japan) Koji Yamamoto					Kakogawa	
2006	(Japan) Ryuichi Tayasu					Sumoto	
2005	(Japan) Kazuhiko Yamashita					Higashijoyo	
2004	(Japan) Tadahisa Inoue					Biwako	
2003	(Japan) Satoshi Oide					Higashihirono	
2002	(Japan) Yuya Kamide					Nara International	
2001	(Japan) Hidemasa Hoshino					Miki	
2000	(Japan) Osamu Yamaguchi					Ikeda	
1999	(Japan) Takenori Hiraishi (2)					Ono Grand	
1998	(Japan) Shusaku Sugimoto					Shiga	
1997	(Japan) Tatsuo Takasaki					Century Yoshikawa	
1996	(Japan) Takenori Hiraishi					Grandeji	
1995	(Japan) Asahiko Makazawa					Otaninishiki	
1994	(Japan) Kazuo Kanayama					Asahi International Tojo	
1993	(Japan) Kotobuki Nakase					Minagi	
1992	(Japan) Masanobu Kimura (2)					Manju	
1991	(Japan) Toshikazu Sugihara	283	−5	1 stroke	(Japan) Teruo Sugihara	Lions	
1990	(Japan) Teruo Sugihara (9)	282	−6	1 stroke	(Japan) Yuzo Oyama	Pine Lake	
1989	(Japan) Yoshitaka Yamamoto (2)	211	−5	1 stroke	(Japan) Kazuo Kanayama (Japan) Toshiaki Nakagawa (Japan) Tōru Nakamura	Hanayashiki (Hirono)	
1988	(Japan) Yasuo Sone	286	−2	3 strokes	(Japan) Shinsaku Maeda	Kitarokko (East)	
1987	(Japan) Masanobu Kimura	292	+4	2 strokes	(Japan) Tōru Nakamura	Asahikokusai Tojyo	
1986	(Japan) Yoshiyuki Isomura	284	−4	3 strokes	(Japan) Yoshio Ichikawa (Japan) Shinsaku Maeda (Japan) Kazuo Yoshikawa	Rokko Kokusai	
1985	(Japan) Tsutomu Irie	280	−8	3 strokes	(Japan) Hisao Inoue (Japan) Yoshitaka Yamamoto	Arima Royal	
1984	(Japan) Tōru Nakamura	281	−7	2 strokes	(Japan) Yoshitaka Yamamoto	Hino	
1983	(Japan) Susumu Wakita	284	−4	2 strokes	(Japan) Teruo Sugihara	Arima Royal	
1982	(Japan) Teruo Sugihara (8)	285	−3			Rokko Kokusai	
1981	(Japan) Akio Kanemoto (2)	278	−10	2 strokes	(Japan) Toshimitsu Kai (Japan) Ichiro Teramoto	Meishin Yokaichi	
1980	(Japan) Takemitsu Uranishi	284	−4	6 strokes	(Japan) Tōru Nakamura (Japan) Kosaku Shimada	Hanayashiki (Yokawa)	
1979	(Japan) Yasuhiro Miyamoto	283	−5			Rokko Kokusai	
1978	(Japan) Akio Kanemoto	284	−4	Playoff	(Japan) Yasuhiro Miyamoto	Omi	
1977	(Japan) Yoshitaka Yamamoto	285	−3			Hino	
1976	(Japan) Shinsaku Maeda	273	−15	1 stroke	(Japan) Akio Kanemoto	Biwako	
1975	(Japan) Teruo Sugihara (7)	279	−9	6 strokes	(Japan) Yoshitaka Yamamoto	Ono	
1974	(Japan) Teruo Sugihara (6)	287	−1			Nara Kokusai	
1973	(Japan) Teruo Sugihara (5)	273	−15			Nishinomiya	
1972	(Japan) Kazuo Yoshikawa					Hirono	
1971	(Japan) Teruo Sugihara (4)					Ibaraki	
1970	(Japan) Kosaku Shimada					Naruo	
1969	(Japan) Shigeru Uchida					Hirono	
1968	(Japan) Teruo Sugihara (3)					Shimonoseki	
1967	(Japan) Teruo Suzumura					Yokkaichi	
1966	(Japan) Shozo Miyamoto					Ibaraki	
1965	(Japan) Teruo Sugihara (2)					Naruo	
1964	(Japan) Teruo Sugihara					Koga	
1963	(Japan) Tadashi Kitta (3)					Hirono	
1962	(Japan) Tadashi Kitta (2)					Nishinomiya	
1961	(Japan) Tetsuo Ishii (2)					Nagoya	
1960	(Japan) Susumu Arai					Nara International	
1959	(Japan) Michio Ishii (3)					Aichi	
1958	(Japan) Tadashi Kitta					Naruo	
1957	(Japan) Yousei Shimamura					Ibaraki	
1956	(Japan) Tetsuo Ishii					Takarazuka	
1955	(Japan) Michio Ishii (2)					Hirono	
1954	(Japan) Mitsuji Kimoto					Naruo	
1953	(Japan) Michio Ishii					Ibaraki	
1952	(Japan) Yasuke Yamada					Hirono	
1951	(Japan) Tomekichi Miyamoto (4)					Takarazuka	
1950	(Japan) Tomekichi Miyamoto (3)					Naruo	
1949	(Japan) Toichiro Toda (4)					Takarazuka	
1940–1948: No tournament due to World War II
1939	(Japan) Toichiro Toda (3)					Hirono	
1938	(Japan) Toichiro Toda (2)					Hirono	
1937	(Japan) Akira Muraki					Naruo	
1936	(Japan) Iwaichi Uekashi					Ibaraki	
1935	(Japan) Jiro Morioka (4)					Naruo	
1934	(Japan) Jiro Morioka (3)					Naruo	
1933	(Japan) Toichiro Toda					Ibaraki	
1932	(Japan) Jiro Morioka (2)					Hirono	
1931	(Japan) Tomekichi Miyamoto (2)					Naruo	
1930	(Japan) Takeo Ishisumi					Ibaraki	
1929	(Japan) Jiro Morioka					Naruo	
1928	(Japan) Tomekichi Miyamoto					Ibaraki	
1927	(Japan) Kazuichi Nakagami					Naruo	
1926	(Japan) Kakuji Fukui					Ibaraki	
