= Fujisankei Classic =

Lopia Fujisankei Classic
Tournament information
- Location: Fujikawaguchiko, Yamanashi, Japan
- Established: 1973
- Course: Fujizakura Country Club
- Par: 70
- Length: 7,566 yards (6,918 m)
- Tour: Japan Golf Tour
- Format: Stroke play
- Prize fund: ¥110,000,000
- Month played: September

Tournament record score
- Aggregate: 267 Todd Hamilton (2003); 267 Paul Sheehan (2004)
- To par: −17 as above

Current champion
- (Japan) Taiga Nagano

Final champion
- Location in Japan Location in the Yamanashi Prefecture

The Fujisankei Classic (フジサンケイクラシック, Fuji sankei kurashikku) is a professional golf tournament on the Japan Golf Tour. It was first played in 1973 at the Takasaka Country Club (Yoneyama Course). The tournament moved to the Higashi-Matsuyama Golf Club in 1979 and to the Kawana Hotel's Fuji course in 1981. The tournament has been held at the Fujizakura Country Club in Yamanashi Prefecture since 2005. The prize fund in 2019 was ¥110,000,000, with ¥22,000,000 going to the winner.

Due to the COVID-19 pandemic, the Fujisankei Classic was held without spectators in 2020, but was not cancelled, as was that year's women's tournament, the Fujisankei Ladies Classic. The 2025 Fujisankei Ladies Classic has been cancelled by the sponsor, the Fujisankei Communications Group, in the wake of the sexual harassment scandal surrounding former TV personality and idol Masahiro Nakai. The status of the upcoming men's tournament remains unclear.

== Tournament hosts ==
Years	Venue	Location
2005–present	Fujizakura Country Club	Fujikawaguchiko, Yamanashi
1981–2004	Kawana Hotel (Fuji Course)	Itō, Shizuoka
1979–1980	Higashi Matsuyama Country Club	Higashimatsuyama, Saitama
1973–1978	Takasaka Country Club (Yoneyama Course)	Higashimatsuyama, Saitama

== Winners ==
Year	Winner	Score	To Par	Margin of victory	Runner(s)-up	Ref.
Lopia Fujisankei Classic
2025	(Japan) Taiga Nagano	200 (Note: Shortened to 54 holes due to weather.)	−10	1 stroke	(Japan) Yuta Sugiura	
Fujisankei Classic
2024	(Japan) Kensei Hirata	131 (Note: Shortened to 36 holes due to weather.)	−9	2 strokes	(South Africa) Shaun Norris	
2023	(Japan) Takumi Kanaya	272	−8	4 strokes	(Japan) Naoyuki Kataoka	
2022	(Japan) Kaito Onishi	273	−11	Playoff	(South Korea) Park Sang-hyun	
2021	(Japan) Shugo Imahira	272	−12	4 strokes	(Japan) Kenshiro Ikegami (Japan) Ryo Ishikawa	
2020	(Japan) Rikuya Hoshino	275	−9	Playoff	(Japan) Mikumu Horikawa	
2019	(South Korea) Park Sang-hyun	269	−15	2 strokes	(South Korea) Choi Ho-sung (Japan) Hiroshi Iwata	
2018	(Japan) Rikuya Hoshino	268	−16	5 strokes	(Japan) Shugo Imahira	
2017	(South Korea) Ryu Hyun-woo	281	−3	Playoff	(United States) Seungsu Han (Japan) Satoshi Kodaira	
2016	(South Korea) Cho Min-gyu	277	−7	3 strokes	(Japan) Ryo Ishikawa (Japan) Daisuke Kataoka (Japan) Daisuke Maruyama (Japan) Tadahiro Takayama	
2015	(South Korea) Kim Kyung-tae (2)	275	−9	1 stroke	(South Korea) Lee Kyoung-hoon	
2014	(Japan) Hiroshi Iwata	274	−10	1 stroke	(South Korea) Hur In-hoi	
2013	(Japan) Hideki Matsuyama	275	−9	Playoff	(South Korea) Park Sung-joon (Japan) Hideto Tanihara	
2012	(South Korea) Kim Kyung-tae	276	−8	1 stroke	(Japan) Yuta Ikeda	
2011	(Japan) Masatsugu Morofuji	136	−6	3 strokes	(Singapore) Mardan Mamat	
2010	(Japan) Ryo Ishikawa (2)	275	−9	Playoff	(Japan) Shunsuke Sonoda	
2009	(Japan) Ryo Ishikawa	272	−12	5 strokes	(Japan) Daisuke Maruyama	
2008	(Japan) Toyokazu Fujishima	271	−13	Playoff	(Japan) Hiroshi Iwata	
2007	(Japan) Hideto Tanihara	205	−8	3 strokes	(Thailand) Prayad Marksaeng	
2006	(Japan) Shingo Katayama	274	−10	3 strokes	(China) Liang Wenchong	
2005	(Japan) Daisuke Maruyama	271	−13	7 strokes	(Japan) Shingo Katayama	
2004	(Australia) Paul Sheehan	267	−17	4 strokes	(Japan) Mitsuhiro Tateyama (Japan) Kaname Yokoo	
2003	(United States) Todd Hamilton	267	−17	5 strokes	(Japan) Tetsuji Hiratsuka (Japan) Shigeru Nonaka	
2002	(Japan) Nobuhito Sato	276	−8	Playoff	(Australia) Scott Laycock	
2001	(Philippines) Frankie Miñoza	276	−8	1 stroke	(Japan) Tsukasa Watanabe	
2000	(Japan) Tateo Ozaki (2)	278	−6	1 stroke	(Japan) Nobuhito Sato (Taiwan) Yeh Chang-ting	
1999	(Japan) Shigemasa Higaki	273	−11	2 strokes	(Australia) Steven Conran	
1998	(Paraguay) Carlos Franco	275	−9	1 stroke	(Taiwan) Chen Tze-chung	
1997	(Japan) Kenichi Kuboya	279	−5	1 stroke	(Japan) Yoshinori Kaneko (Japan) Masashi Ozaki	
1996	(United States) Brian Watts	272	−12	Playoff	(United States) Todd Hamilton	
1995	(Japan) Tsuneyuki Nakajima (2)	272	−12	2 strokes	(Japan) Masahiro Kuramoto	
1994	(Japan) Kiyoshi Murota	284	E	4 strokes	(Japan) Nobuo Serizawa	
1993	(Japan) Masashi Ozaki (6)	270	−14	4 strokes	(United States) Todd Hamilton (Japan) Tsukasa Watanabe	
1992	(Japan) Hiroshi Makino	281	−3	3 strokes	(Japan) Saburo Fujiki	
1991	(Japan) Saburo Fujiki	279	−5	Playoff	(Japan) Isao Aoki (Australia) Brian Jones (Japan) Hideki Kase	
1990	(Japan) Masashi Ozaki (5)	208	−5	1 stroke	(Japan) Saburo Fujiki (Japan) Masanobu Kimura (Japan) Tōru Nakamura (Japan) Naomichi Ozaki (Japan) Yoshitaka Yamamoto	
1989	(Japan) Masashi Ozaki (4)	282	−2	2 strokes	(Japan) Katsunari Takahashi	
1988	(Japan) Ikuo Shirahama	280	−4	2 strokes	(Japan) Nobumitsu Yuhara	
1987	(Japan) Masashi Ozaki (3)	275	−9	2 strokes	(Australia) Graham Marsh	
1986	(Japan) Masashi Ozaki (2)	279	−5	1 stroke	(United States) David Ishii	
1985	(United States) Mark O'Meara	273	−11	3 strokes	(Japan) Masashi Ozaki	
1984	(Japan) Tateo Ozaki	280	−4	Playoff	(Taiwan) Hsieh Min-Nan	
1983	(Japan) Nobumitsu Yuhara	287	+3	1 stroke	(Japan) Masahiro Kuramoto	
1982	(Japan) Tsuneyuki Nakajima	277	−7	Playoff	(Australia) Graham Marsh	
1981	(Japan) Toshiharu Kawada	276	−8	2 strokes	(Japan) Isao Aoki	
1980	(Japan) Masashi Ozaki	283	−5	1 stroke	(Australia) Graham Marsh (Japan) Takahiro Takeyasu	
1979	(Japan) Shoichi Sato	283	−5	1 stroke	(Japan) Isao Aoki	
1978	(Japan) Kosaku Shimada	278	−10	3 strokes	(Japan) Isao Aoki	
1977	(Japan) Yasuhiro Miyamoto	287	−1	1 stroke	(Japan) Yoshitaka Yamamoto	
1976	(Japan) Norio Suzuki	279	−9	Playoff	(Taiwan) Lu Liang-Huan	
1975	(Taiwan) Lu Liang-Huan	280	−8	4 strokes	(Australia) Graham Marsh	
1974	(Australia) Graham Marsh (2)	276	−12	1 stroke	(Japan) Tōru Nakamura	
1973	(Australia) Graham Marsh	272	−16	1 stroke	(Japan) Tōru Nakamura	
