= Akio Kanemoto =

Japanese professional golfer (born 1945)

Personal information
- Nationality: Japan
- Born: 9 April 1945 (age 81) Japan
- Height: 1.75 m (5 ft 9 in)
- Weight: 70 kg (150 lb; 11 st)

Career
- Sport: Golf
- Status: Professional
- Former tour: Japan Golf Tour
- Professional wins: 4

Number of wins by tour
- Japan Golf Tour: 3
- Other: 1

Akio Kanemoto (born 9 April 1945) is a Japanese professional golfer.

== Career ==
In the 1970s and 1980s, Kanemoto played on the Japan Golf Tour, winning three times.

== Professional wins (4) ==
=== PGA of Japan Tour wins (3) ===
No.	Date	Tournament	Winning score	Margin of victory	Runner(s)-up
1	9 Jul 1978	Kansai Open	−4 (70-73-70-71=284)	Playoff	(Japan) Yasuhiro Miyamoto
2	10 Sep 1978	Suntory Open	−7 (68-71-72-70=281)	1 stroke	(Japan) Isao Aoki
3	6 Sep 1981	Kansai Open (2)	−10 (70-68-71-69=278)	2 strokes	(Japan) Toshimitsu Kai, (Japan) Ichiro Teramoto

PGA of Japan Tour playoff record (1–1)

No.	Year	Tournament	Opponent	Result
1	1978	Kansai Open	(Japan) Yasuhiro Miyamoto	Won with par on second extra hole
2	1980	Kansai Pro Championship	(Japan) Teruo Sugihara	Lost to par on fifth extra hole

=== Other wins (1) ===
- 1978 Mizuno Open
