= Go Higaki =

Japanese professional golfer (born 1976)

Personal information
- Nationality: Japan
- Born: 26 April 1976 (age 50) Osaka Prefecture, Japan
- Height: 1.81 m (5 ft 11 in)
- Weight: 76 kg (168 lb; 12.0 st)

Career
- Sport: Golf
- Status: Professional
- Current tour: Japan Golf Tour
- Professional wins: 2

Number of wins by tour
- Japan Golf Tour: 1
- Other: 1

Go Higaki (桧垣 豪, Higaki Gō; born 26 April 1976 in Osaka Prefecture) is a Japanese professional golfer.

== Career ==
Higaki plays on the Japan Golf Tour, where he has won once.

== Professional wins (2) ==
=== Japan Golf Tour wins (1) ===
No.	Date	Tournament	Winning score	Margin of victory	Runner-up
1	29 Jul 2001	NST Niigata Open Golf Championship	−24 (66-67-65-66=264)	6 strokes	(Australia) Scott Laycock

=== Japan Challenge Tour wins (1) ===
- 1997 Daiwa Cup Kochi Open

== Playoff record ==
Asian PGA Tour playoff record (0–1)

No.	Year	Tournament	Opponent	Result
1	1996	Tournament Players Championship	(South Korea) Kang Wook-soon	Lost to par on first extra hole
