= 1974 PGA of Japan Tour =

Golf tour season

1974 PGA of Japan Tour season
- Duration: 16 February 1974 – 8 December 1974
- Number of official events: 31
- Most wins: (Japan) Masashi Ozaki (6)
- Money list: (Japan) Masashi Ozaki

The 1974 PGA of Japan Tour was the second season of the PGA of Japan Tour, the main professional golf tour in Japan since it was formed in 1973.

== Schedule ==
The following table lists official events during the 1974 season.

Date	Tournament	Location	Purse (¥)	Winner (Note: The number in brackets after each winner's name is the number of PGA of Japan Tour events they had won up to and including that tournament. This information is only shown for PGA of Japan Tour members.)	Other tours (Note: AGC − Asia Golf Circuit.)	Notes
17 Feb	JPGA East-West Match	Okinawa	12,000,000	(Japan) Isao Aoki (6)		
21 Apr	Sobu International Open	Chiba	US$50,000	(Taiwan) Lu Liang-Huan (2)	AGC	New to PGA of Japan Tour
29 Apr	Chunichi Crowns	Aichi	28,000,000	(Japan) Takashi Murakami (2)		
12 May	Fujisankei Classic	Saitama	30,000,000	(Australia) Graham Marsh (2)		
19 May	Dunlop Tournament	Chiba	20,000,000	(Australia) Graham Marsh (3)		
26 May	Pepsi Tournament	Ishikawa	25,000,000	(Australia) Graham Marsh (4)		
2 Jun	Sports Shinko International	Hyōgo	25,000,000	(Japan) Shozo Miyamoto (1)		New tournament
16 Jun	Sapporo Tokyu Open	Hokkaidō	20,000,000	(Japan) Tōru Nakamura (2)		
23 Jun	Tohoku Classic	Miyagi	17,000,000	(Japan) Masashi Ozaki (6)		
7 Jul	ANA Sapporo Open	Hokkaidō	20,000,000	(Japan) Masashi Ozaki (7)		
11 Jul	Kyusyu Open	Nagasaki	1,800,000	(Japan) Norio Suzuki (1)		
11 Jul	Kansai Open	Nara	3,500,000	(Japan) Teruo Sugihara (3)		
11 Jul	Chushikoku Open	Hiroshima	1,300,000	(Japan) Mitsuhiko Masuda (2)		
12 Jul	Chubu Open	Hiroshima	3,000,000	(Japan) Tadashi Kitta (1)		
14 Jul	Kanto Open	Ibaraki	15,000,000	(Japan) Isao Aoki (7)		
21 Jul	Tokyo Charity Classic	Chiba	30,000,000	(Japan) Haruo Yasuda (1)		
4 Aug	Kanto Pro Championship	Ibaraki	10,000,000	(Japan) Isao Aoki (8)		
18 Aug	Japan PGA Championship	Miyagi	13,500,000	(Japan) Masashi Ozaki (8)		
25 Aug	KBC Augusta	Fukuoka	23,000,000	(Japan) Tōru Nakamura (3)		
1 Sep	Hiroshima Open	Hiroshima	20,000,000	(Taiwan) Lu Liang-Huan (2)		
8 Sep	Suntory Open	Chiba	25,000,000	(Japan) Masashi Ozaki (9)		
15 Sep	Sanpo Classic	Chiba	25,000,000	(Japan) Isao Aoki (9)		
22 Sep	Kansai Pro Championship	Osaka	8,000,000	(Japan) Kosaku Shimada (2)		
29 Sep	Japan Open Golf Championship	Ibaraki	30,000,000	(Japan) Masashi Ozaki (10)		
6 Oct	Golf Digest Tournament	Shizuoka	20,000,000	(Japan) Takashi Murakami (3)		
27 Oct	Tokai Classic	Aichi	25,000,000	(Japan) Kosaku Shimada (3)		
3 Nov	Bridgestone Tournament	Chiba	21,500,000	(Australia) Graham Marsh (5)		
17 Nov	Golf Nippon Series	Tokyo	15,000,000	(Japan) Masashi Ozaki (11)		New to PGA of Japan Tour
24 Nov	Shizuoka Open	Shizuoka	20,000,000	(Japan) Takashi Kurihara (2)		
1 Dec	ABC Japan vs USA Golf Matches	Wakayama	23,000,000	(Japan) Teruo Sugihara (4)		
8 Dec	Dunlop Phoenix Tournament	Miyazaki	51,000,000	(United States) Johnny Miller (n/a)		

=== Unofficial events ===
The following events were sanctioned by the PGA of Japan Tour, but did not carry official money, nor were wins official.

Date	Tournament	Location	Purse (¥)	Winner
13 Oct	Taiheiyo Club Masters	Chiba	US$300,000	(United States) Gene Littler

== Money list ==
The money list was based on prize money won during the season, calculated in Japanese yen.

Position	Player	Prize money (¥)
1	(Japan) Masashi Ozaki	41,846,908
2	(Japan) Takashi Murakami	31,603,626
3	(Japan) Teruo Sugihara	21,121,901
4	(Japan) Isao Aoki	20,711,666
5	(Japan) Tōru Nakamura	20,079,777
