= Kiyoshi Murota =

Japanese professional golfer

Kiyoshi Murota 室田淳
Personal information
- Nationality: Japan
- Born: 26 July 1955 (age 71) Gunma Prefecture, Japan
- Height: 1.80 m (5 ft 11 in)
- Weight: 80 kg (180 lb; 13 st)

Career
- Sport: Golf
- College: Nippon Sport Science University
- Turned professional: 1982
- Current tour: Japan PGA Senior Tour
- Former tours: Japan Golf Tour; Champions Tour
- Professional wins: 33

Number of wins by tour
- Japan Golf Tour: 6
- Other: 27

Kiyoshi Murota (Japanese: 室田淳, born 26 July 1955) is a Japanese professional golfer.

== Career ==
Murota was born in Gunma Prefecture and attended the Nippon Sport Science University. After graduating, he became golf teaching instructor, and was well liked in Japan because of his easy, simple tips to help amateur golfers. While teaching, he would keep trying to become a touring professional. He obtained his Japan Golf Tour card after four tries at qualifying school after 1982.

Murota's first win on the Japan Golf Tour came in 1991 but his best season money wise was 1992, where he finished 6th on the Order of Merit list, earning US$980,000 for the season. He had a total of six career wins on the Japan Tour between 1991 and 2003.

Murota won many tournaments all over Japan, including non-order of merit events and pro-ams all over Japan.

Murota has attempted to travel across the Pacific Ocean and play successfully on the PGA Tour, but that success was not found. In seven career PGA Tour events, his three best finishes came in 1993 at the United Airlines Hawaiian Open (T66), at the 1994 Nissan Los Angeles Open (T20), and at the 1994 Bob Hope Chrysler Classic (T28).

Murota represented Japan in the 1992 World Cup.

=== Senior career ===
Since turning 50, Murota has played on the Japan Senior PGA Tour and the United States-based Champions Tour. Most notably, he won the Japan PGA Senior Championship in 2005, 2009, 2012, and 2015. He won the Order of Merit title in consecutive years on the Japan Senior PGA Tour in 2006 and 2007, winning an event in each of those years. In five events in 2006, he won two, and never finished outside of the top four in winning the Order of Merit. His second Order of Merit year was 2007, included one victory and four runner-up finishes. He has played in a few senior major championships also.

== Professional wins (33) ==
=== Japan Golf Tour wins (6) ===
No.	Date	Tournament	Winning score	Margin of victory	Runner(s)-up
1	21 Apr 1991	Bridgestone Aso Open	−8 (68-72-68=208)	2 strokes	(Japan) Taisei Inagaki
2	26 Jul 1992	Nikkei Cup	−8 (71-69-70-70=280)	Playoff	(Japan) Masahiro Kuramoto
3	8 May 1994	Fujisankei Classic	E (69-70-73-72=284)	4 strokes	(Japan) Nobuo Serizawa
4	25 Nov 2001	Casio World Open	−24 (65-68-63-68=264)	2 strokes	(Fiji) Dinesh Chand
5	24 Mar 2002	Dydo Drinco Shizuoka Open	−12 (67-68-72-69=276)	2 strokes	(South Korea) Kim Jong-duck, (Japan) Masashi Ozaki
6	16 Nov 2003	Mitsui Sumitomo Visa Taiheiyo Masters	−16 (66-71-62-73=272)	6 strokes	(United States) Ben Curtis, (Japan) Hiroyuki Fujita, (South Korea) Kim Jong-duck

Japan Golf Tour playoff record (1–2)

No.	Year	Tournament	Opponent	Result
1	1992	Nikkei Cup	(Japan) Masahiro Kuramoto	Won with birdie on first extra hole
2	1992	Dunlop Phoenix Tournament	(South Africa) David Frost	Lost to par on second extra hole
3	2003	Woodone Open Hiroshima	(Japan) Toshimitsu Izawa	Lost to par on first extra hole

=== Other wins (7) ===
- 1990 Mori Minato Cup
- 1991 KSD Charity
- 1992 Tochigi Open
- 1997 Pearl Open, Hirao Masaaki Pro-Am
- 1998 Toyamaken Open
- 2011 Legend Charity Pro-Am

=== Japan PGA Senior Tour wins (20) ===
- 2005 Japan PGA Senior Championship
- 2006 Aderans Wellness Open, Fancl Classic
- 2007 Fancl Classic
- 2009 Japan PGA Senior Championship
- 2010 Sakakibara Onsen GC Senior Open
- 2011 Japan Senior Open
- 2012 Japan PGA Senior Championship
- 2013 Kyoraku More Surprise Cup, Japan Senior Open, Iwasaki Shiratsuyu Senior Golf Tournament
- 2014 Fujifilm Senior Championship
- 2015 Starts Senior Golf Tournament, Fancl Classic, Japan PGA Senior Championship
- 2016 Fancl Classic, Alfa Club Cup Senior Open
- 2017 Kyoraku More Surprise Cup, Alfa Club Cup Senior Open
- 2018 Kumamoto Aso Senior Open Golf Tournament

== Team appearances ==
- World Cup (representing Japan): 1992
- Dynasty Cup (representing Japan): 2003
