= Japan PGA Senior Championship =

Tournament information
- Location: Rotates
- Established: 1962
- Course: Rotates
- Organized by: PGA of Japan
- Format: Stroke play
- Prize fund: ¥50,000,000
- Month played: October

Current champion
- (Scotland) Simon Yates

The Japan PGA Senior Championship is one of the major events on the Japan Senior Tour. It was first played in 1962. The 2007 prize money was ¥50,000,000.

== Winners ==
this list is incomplete

- 2025 Simon Yates
- 2024 Nobuhiro Masuda
- 2023 Thammanoon Sriroj
- 2022 Prayad Marksaeng
- 2021 Mitsuhiro Tateyama
- 2020 Masayoshi Nakayama
- 2019 Hidezumi Shirakata
- 2018 Tsuyoshi Yoneyama
- 2017 Lu Chien-soon
- 2016 Prayad Marksaeng
- 2015 Kiyoshi Murota
- 2014 Naomichi Ozaki
- 2013 Tsukasa Watanabe
- 2012 Kiyoshi Murota
- 2011 Kim Jong-duck
- 2010 Hideki Kase
- 2009 Kiyoshi Murota
- 2008 Tsukasa Watanabe
- 2007 Tateo Ozaki
- 2006 Tsuneyuki Nakajima
- 2005 Kiyoshi Murota
- 2004 Takaaki Fukuzawa
- 2003 Noboru Fujiike
- 2002 Chen Tze-ming
- 2001 Yasuhiro Miyamoto
- 2000 Katsunari Takahashi
- 1999 Tadami Ueno
- 1998 Seiichi Kanai
- 1997 Ichiro Teramoto
- 1996 Koji Nakajima
- 1995 Teruo Sugihara
- 1994 Shigeru Uchida
- 1993 Shigeru Uchida
- 1992 Teruo Sugihara
- 1991 Hiroshi Ishii
- 1990 Seiichi Kanai
- 1989 Teruo Sugihara
- 1988 Chi-Chi Rodríguez
- 1987 Kesahiko Uchida
- 1986 Tadashi Kitta
- 1985
- 1984 Hsieh Yung-yo
- 1983
- 1982 Seiichi Sato
- 1981 Chen Ching-Po
- 1980 Yoshimasa Fujii
- 1979 Yoshimasa Fujii
- 1978 Tetsuo Ishii
- 1977 Tomoo Ishii
- 1976 Torakichi Nakamura
- 1975 Haruyoshi Kobari
- 1974 Michio Ishii
- 1973 Torakichi Nakamura
- 1972 Toichiro Toda
- 1971 Haruyoshi Kobari
- 1970 Toichiro Toda
- 1969 Toichiro Toda
- 1968 Toichiro Toda
- 1967 Toichiro Toda
- 1966 Toichiro Toda
- 1965
- 1964
- 1963
- 1962 Kinichi Teramoto
