= Eiji Mizoguchi =

Japanese professional golfer

Personal information
- Nationality: Japan
- Born: 7 December 1964 (age 61) Aichi Prefecture, Japan
- Height: 1.72 m (5 ft 8 in)
- Weight: 70 kg (150 lb; 11 st)

Career
- Sport: Golf
- Turned professional: 1989
- Current tour: Japan PGA Senior Tour
- Former tour: Japan Golf Tour
- Professional wins: 8

Number of wins by tour
- Japan Golf Tour: 2
- Other: 6

Eiji Mizoguchi (born 7 December 1964) is a Japanese professional golfer from Nagoya.

== Career ==
Mizoguchi played on the Japan Golf Tour and won twice.

== Professional wins (8) ==
=== Japan Golf Tour wins (2) ===
| No. | Date | Tournament | Winning score | Margin of victory | Runner(s)-up |
|---|---|---|---|---|---|
| 1 | 16 Oct 1994 | Asahi Beer Golf Digest Tournament | −19 (70-68-64-63=265) | 5 strokes | (Australia) Stewart Ginn, (Japan) Hiroshi Ueda |
| 2 | 18 Mar 2001 | Dydo Drinco Shizuoka Open | −9 (68-68-66-77=279) | Playoff | (Philippines) Frankie Miñoza |

Japan Golf Tour playoff record (1–1)

| No. | Year | Tournament | Opponent | Result |
|---|---|---|---|---|
| 1 | 1994 | PGA Philanthropy Tournament | (United States) Todd Hamilton | Lost to birdie on first extra hole |
| 2 | 2001 | Dydo Drinco Shizuoka Open | (Philippines) Frankie Miñoza | Won with par on first extra hole |

=== Other wins (3) ===
- 1994 Chubu Open
- 1999 Chubu Open
- 2011 Hokkaido Open

=== Japan PGA Senior Tour wins (3) ===
| No. | Date | Tournament | Winning score | Margin of victory | Runner(s)-up |
|---|---|---|---|---|---|
| 1 | 28 Apr 2019 | Fubon Yeangder Senior Cup^{1} | −6 (72-66=138) | Playoff | (Japan) Takeshi Sakiyama |
| 2 | 16 Nov 2019 | Elite Grip Senior Open | −5 (68-67=135) | 2 strokes | (Japan) Masayuki Kawamura, (Japan) Norio Shinozaki, (South Korea) Suk Jong-yul, (Japan) Akira Teranishi |
| 3 | 29 Nov 2020 | Iwasaki Shiratsuyu Senior Tournament | −6 (71-70-69=210) | Playoff | (United States) Gregory Meyer |

^{1}Co-sanctioned by the Taiwan PGA Tour
