= Sports Shinko International =

Tournament information
- Location: Kawanishi, Hyōgo, Japan
- Established: 1974
- Course: Yamanohara Golf Club
- Par: 72
- Tour: Japan Golf Tour
- Format: Stroke play
- Prize fund: ¥30,000,000
- Month played: July
- Final year: 1975

Tournament record score
- Aggregate: 280 Yasuhiro Miyamoto (1975)
- To par: −8 as above

Final champion
- (Japan) Yasuhiro Miyamoto

Location map
- Location in Japan Location in Hyōgo Prefecture

The Sports Shinko International was a professional golf tournament in Japan in 1974 and 1975. It was an event on the Japan Golf Tour and offered the biggest prize on the tour during the summer months, ¥30 million in 1974. It was held at the Yamanohara Golf Club near Kawanishi in Hyōgo Prefecture.

== Winners ==
Year	Winner	Score	To par	Margin of victory	Runner-up	Ref.
1975	(Japan) Yasuhiro Miyamoto	280	−8	2 strokes	(Japan) Tōru Nakamura	
1974	(Japan) Shozo Miyamoto	289	+1	2 strokes	(Japan) Haruo Yasuda	
