= Shigenori Mori =

Japanese professional golfer

Personal information
- Nationality: Japan
- Born: 9 May 1958 (age 68) Kanagawa Prefecture, Japan
- Height: 1.77 m (5 ft 10 in)
- Weight: 80 kg (180 lb; 13 st)

Career
- Sport: Golf
- Status: Professional
- Former tour: Japan Golf Tour
- Professional wins: 2

Number of wins by tour
- Japan Golf Tour: 2

Best results in major championships
- Masters Tournament: DNP
- PGA Championship: DNP
- U.S. Open: DNP
- The Open Championship: CUT: 1997

Shigenori Mori (born 9 May 1958) is a Japanese professional golfer.

== Career ==
Mori played on the Japan Golf Tour, winning twice.

== Professional wins (2) ==
=== PGA of Japan Tour wins (2) ===
No.	Date	Tournament	Winning score	Margin of victory	Runner(s)-up
1	5 Nov 1995	Daiwa International	−8 (71-67-69-73=280)	1 stroke	(United States) David Ishii, (Japan) Hisayuki Sasaki
2	25 May 1997	Ube Kosan Open	−17 (67-64-68-68=267)	4 strokes	(Japan) Shigemasa Higaki
