= Wakita (surname) =

Wakita (written: 脇田) is a Japanese surname. Notable people with the surname include:

- Haruko Wakita (脇田 晴子, born 1934), Japanese historian
- Hiroto Wakita (脇田 洋人, born 1967), Japanese professional wrestler, better known by his stage name Super Delfin
- Susumu Wakita (born 1947), Japanese golfer
- Toshio Wakita (脇田 寿雄, born 1965), Japanese bobsledder
