= Koichi Suzuki =

Japanese professional golfer

Personal information
- Nationality: Japan
- Born: 7 January 1956 (age 70) Shizuoka Prefecture, Japan
- Height: 1.71 m (5 ft 7 in)
- Weight: 70 kg (150 lb; 11 st)

Career
- Sport: Golf
- Status: Professional
- Former tour: Japan Golf Tour
- Professional wins: 4

Number of wins by tour
- Japan Golf Tour: 4

Koichi Suzuki (born 7 January 1956) is a Japanese professional golfer.

== Career ==
Suzuki played on the Japan Golf Tour, winning four times.

== Professional wins (4) ==
=== PGA of Japan Tour wins (4) ===
No.	Date	Tournament	Winning score	Margin of victory	Runner(s)-up
1	22 Jun 1986	Yomiuri Sapporo Beer Open	−19 (68-69-67-69=273)	2 strokes	(Australia) Brian Jones
2	19 Mar 1989	Shizuoka Open	−3 (67-78-69-71=285)	1 stroke	(Japan) Naomichi Ozaki, (Japan) Nobumitsu Yuhara
3	20 Aug 1989	Maruman Open	−10 (70-63-71-74=278)	1 stroke	(Japan) Satoshi Higashi, (Japan) Tsukasa Watanabe
4	2 Jun 1991	Mitsubishi Galant Tournament	−8 (73-69-70-68=280)	1 stroke	(Japan) Isao Aoki, (Japan) Tsuneyuki Nakajima

PGA of Japan Tour playoff record (0–1)

No.	Year	Tournament	Opponents	Result
1	1994	Mizuno Open	(Colombia) Eduardo Herrera, (Japan) Yoshinori Kaneko, (United States) Brian Watts	Watts won with birdie on first extra hole

== Team appearances ==
- World Cup (representing Japan): 1987
- Four Tours World Championship (representing Japan): 1986 (winners), 1989
- Dunhill Cup (representing Japan): 1987, 1989
