= Kazuo Kanayama =

Japanese golfer

Personal information
- Nationality: Japan
- Born: 1 November 1952 (age 74) Hyōgo Prefecture, Japan
- Height: 1.80 m (5 ft 11 in)
- Weight: 88 kg (194 lb; 13.9 st)

Career
- Sport: Golf
- Status: Professional
- Former tour: Japan Golf Tour
- Professional wins: 2

Number of wins by tour
- Japan Golf Tour: 1
- Other: 1

Kazuo Kanayama (金山 和雄; born 1 November 1952) is a Japanese professional golfer.

== Career ==
Kanayama played on the Japan Golf Tour, winning once.

== Professional wins (2) ==
=== PGA of Japan Tour wins (1) ===
No.	Date	Tournament	Winning score	Margin of victory	Runner-up
1	17 Aug 1997	Acom International	41 pts (12-11-9-9=41)	Playoff	(Colombia) Eduardo Herrera

PGA of Japan Tour playoff record (1–0)

No.	Year	Tournament	Opponent	Result
1	1997	Acom International	(Colombia) Eduardo Herrera	Won with birdie on second extra hole

=== Other wins (1) ===
- 1994 Kansai Open
