= Shigemasa Higaki =

Japanese golfer

Personal information
- Nationality: Japan
- Born: 17 October 1971 (age 55) Osaka Prefecture, Japan
- Height: 1.76 m (5 ft 9 in)
- Weight: 73 kg (161 lb; 11.5 st)

Career
- Sport: Golf
- Turned professional: 1994
- Current tour: Japan Golf Tour
- Professional wins: 1

Number of wins by tour
- Japan Golf Tour: 1

Shigemasa Higaki (桧垣 繁正; born 17 October 1971) is a Japanese professional golfer.

== Career ==
Higaki plays on the Japan Golf Tour, where he has won once.

== Professional wins (1) ==
=== Japan Golf Tour wins (1) ===
No.	Date	Tournament	Winning score	Margin of victory	Runner-up
1	9 May 1999	Fujisankei Classic	−11 (67-70-65-71=273)	2 strokes	(Australia) Steven Conran

Japan Golf Tour playoff record (0–3)

No.	Year	Tournament	Opponent(s)	Result
1	1999	JCB Classic Sendai	(Japan) Shingo Katayama	Lost to birdie on third extra hole
2	1999	Yonex Open Hiroshima	(Japan) Masashi Ozaki	Lost to birdie on first extra hole
3	2001	Hisamitsu-KBC Augusta	(Japan) Takenori Hiraishi, (Japan) Hideki Kase	Hiraishi won with birdie on fourth extra hole Kase eliminated by birdie on first hole

== Team appearances ==
- Dunhill Cup (representing Japan): 1997
