= Susumu Wakita =

Japanese golfer

Personal information
- Nationality: Japan
- Born: 11 May 1947 (age 79) Hyogo, Japan
- Height: 1.65 m (5 ft 5 in)
- Weight: 55 kg (121 lb; 8.7 st)

Career
- Sport: Golf
- Status: Professional
- Former tour: Japan Golf Tour
- Professional wins: 1

Number of wins by tour
- Japan Golf Tour: 1

Susumu Wakita (born 11 May 1947) is a Japanese professional golfer.

== Professional career ==
Wakita played on the Japan Golf Tour, winning once.

== Professional wins (1) ==
=== PGA of Japan Tour wins (1) ===
No.	Date	Tournament	Winning score	Margin of victory	Runner-up
1	4 Sep 1983	Kansai Open	−4 (70-72-71-71=284)	2 strokes	(Japan) Teruo Sugihara
