= Akiyoshi Ohmachi =

Japanese professional golfer

Personal information
- Nationality: Japan
- Born: 17 October 1958 (age 68) Gunma Prefecture, Japan
- Height: 1.85 m (6 ft 1 in)
- Weight: 68 kg (150 lb; 10.7 st)

Career
- Sport: Golf
- Status: Professional
- Former tours: Japan Golf Tour; PGA Tour
- Professional wins: 5

Number of wins by tour
- Japan Golf Tour: 4

Akiyoshi Ohmachi (大町 昭義, Ōmachi Akiyoshi; born 17 October 1958) is a Japanese professional golfer.

== Career ==
Ohmachi played on the Japan Golf Tour, winning four times. He also played on the PGA Tour in 1987 and 1988, with a best finish of T-6 at the 1987 Houston Open.

== Professional wins (5) ==
=== PGA of Japan Tour wins (4) ===
| No. | Date | Tournament | Winning score | Margin of victory | Runner(s)-up |
|---|---|---|---|---|---|
| 1 | 23 Mar 1986 | Shizuoka Open | +2 (71-71-76-36=254) (Note: Shortened to 63 holes due to weather.) | Playoff | (Japan) Teruo Sugihara |
| 2 | 25 Jun 1989 | Mizuno Open | −5 (70-72-72-69=283) | 2 strokes | (Australia) Brian Jones, (Japan) Fujio Kobayashi, (Japan) Masahiro Kuramoto, (Japan) Tsuneyuki Nakajima |
| 3 | 3 Dec 1989 | Golf Nippon Series Hitachi Cup | −10 (70-73-69-66=278) | 2 strokes | (Japan) Tsuneyuki Nakajima, (Japan) Katsuyoshi Tomori |
| 4 | 22 Sep 1991 | ANA Open | −6 (68-71-72-71=282) | 2 strokes | (Japan) Ryoken Kawagishi |

PGA of Japan Tour playoff record (1–0)

| No. | Year | Tournament | Opponent | Result |
|---|---|---|---|---|
| 1 | 1986 | Shizuoka Open | (Japan) Teruo Sugihara | Won with par on fourth extra hole |

=== Other wins (1) ===
- 1989 Kanagawa Open

== See also ==
- 1986 PGA Tour Qualifying School graduates
