= First Flight Tournament =

Tournament information
- Location: Gotemba, Shizuoka, Japan
- Established: 1972
- Course: Fuji Heigen Golf Club
- Par: 72
- Tour: Japan Golf Tour
- Format: Stroke play
- Prize fund: ¥12,000,000
- Month played: September
- Final year: 1973

Tournament record score
- Aggregate: 198 Takaaki Kono (1973)
- To par: −18 as above

Final champion
- (Japan) Takaaki Kono

Location map
- Location in Japan Location in Shizuoka Prefecture

The First Flight Tournament was a professional golf tournament in Japan. Founded in 1972, it was an event on the Japan Golf Tour in its inaugural season in 1973. It was held at the Fuji Heigen Golf Club near Gotemba, Shizuoka.

== Winners ==
Year	Winner	Score	To par	Margin of victory	Runner(s)-up	Ref.
1973	(Japan) Takaaki Kono	198 (Note: Shortened to 54 holes due to rain, which forced the cancellation of the third round.)	−18	6 strokes	(Philippines) Ben Arda (Japan) Masashi Ozaki	
1972	(Japan) Masashi Ozaki	135	−9	3 strokes	(Japan) Takashi Murakami	
