= 1997 PGA of Japan Tour =

Golf tour season

1997 PGA of Japan Tour season
- Duration: 13 March 1997 – 14 December 1997
- Number of official events: 36
- Most wins: (Japan) Masashi Ozaki (5)
- Money list: (Japan) Masashi Ozaki

The 1997 PGA of Japan Tour was the 25th season of the PGA of Japan Tour, the main professional golf tour in Japan since it was formed in 1973.

== Schedule ==
The following table lists official events during the 1997 season.

Date	Tournament	Location	Purse (¥)	Winner (Note: The number in brackets after each winner's name is the number of PGA of Japan Tour events they had won up to and including that tournament. This information is only shown for PGA of Japan Tour members.)	OWGR points	Other tours (Note: AGC − Asia Golf Circuit.)	Notes
16 Mar	Token Corporation Cup	Kagoshima	100,000,000	(Japan) Masashi Ozaki (83)	22		
23 Mar	Dydo Drinco Shizuoka Open	Shizuoka	100,000,000	(Japan) Hisayuki Sasaki (3)	18		
30 Mar	Just System KSB Open	Okayama	70,000,000	(Japan) Keiichiro Fukabori (1)	16		
6 Apr	Descente Classic Munsingwear Cup	Ibaraki	100,000,000	(United States) Peter Teravainen (2)	16		
20 Apr	Tsuruya Open	Hyōgo	100,000,000	(Japan) Mitsuo Harada (1)	16		
27 Apr	Kirin Open	Ibaraki	100,000,000	(South Korea) Kim Jong-duck (1)	22	AGC	
4 May	The Crowns	Aichi	120,000,000	(Japan) Masashi Ozaki (84)	36		
11 May	Fujisankei Classic	Shizuoka	120,000,000	(Japan) Kenichi Kuboya (1)	22		
18 May	Japan PGA Championship	Ibaraki	100,000,000	(Japan) Shigeki Maruyama (4)	22		
25 May	Ube Kosan Open	Yamaguchi	100,000,000	(Japan) Shigenori Mori (2)	16		
1 Jun	Mitsubishi Galant Tournament	Hyōgo	120,000,000	(Japan) Masashi Ozaki (85)	18		
8 Jun	JCB Classic Sendai	Miyagi	100,000,000	(Japan) Nobuhito Sato (1)	18		
15 Jun	Sapporo Tokyu Open	Hokkaidō	100,000,000	(Japan) Hirofumi Miyase (1)	16		
22 Jun	Yomiuri Open	Hyōgo	100,000,000	(Japan) Shigeki Maruyama (5)	18		
29 Jun	Mizuno Open	Ishikawa	100,000,000	(United States) Brian Watts (9)	22		
6 Jul	PGA Philanthropy Tournament	Yamanashi	100,000,000	(Japan) Naomichi Ozaki (24)	16		
13 Jul	Yonex Open Hiroshima	Hiroshima	80,000,000	(Japan) Naomichi Ozaki (25)	16		
27 Jul	Nikkei Cup Torakichi Nakamura Memorial	Ibaraki	100,000,000	(Taiwan) Yeh Chang-ting (1)	20		
3 Aug	NST Niigata Open Golf Championship	Niigata	60,000,000	(Japan) Kazuhiko Hosokawa (4)	16		
10 Aug	Sanko Grand Summer Championship	Gunma	100,000,000	(Japan) Shoichi Kuwabara (1)	16		
17 Aug	Acom International	Fukushima	100,000,000	(Japan) Kazuo Kanayama (1)	16		
31 Aug	Hisamitsu-KBC Augusta	Fukuoka	100,000,000	(Japan) Masashi Ozaki (86)	18		
7 Sep	Japan PGA Match-Play Championship Promise Cup	Hokkaidō	80,000,000	(Japan) Shigeki Maruyama (6)	18		
14 Sep	Suntory Open	Chiba	100,000,000	(Japan) Hiroyuki Fujita (1)	26		
21 Sep	ANA Open	Hokkaidō	100,000,000	(Japan) Shinichi Yokota (1)	28		
28 Sep	Gene Sarazen Jun Classic	Tochigi	110,000,000	(Colombia) Eduardo Herrera (3)	22		
5 Oct	Japan Open Golf Championship	Fukuoka	120,000,000	(Australia) Craig Parry (n/a)	32		Flagship event
12 Oct	Tokai Classic	Aichi	110,000,000	(United States) Brandt Jobe (2)	24		
19 Oct	Golf Digest Tournament	Shizuoka	100,000,000	(United States) Brandt Jobe (3)	16		
26 Oct	Bridgestone Open	Chiba	120,000,000	(Japan) Masashi Ozaki (87)	28		
2 Nov	Philip Morris Championship	Hyōgo	200,000,000	(United States) Brian Watts (10)	26		
16 Nov	Sumitomo Visa Taiheiyo Masters	Shizuoka	150,000,000	(England) Lee Westwood (n/a)	36		
23 Nov	Dunlop Phoenix Tournament	Miyazaki	200,000,000	(United States) Tom Watson (n/a)	38		
30 Nov	Casio World Open	Kagoshima	150,000,000	(Japan) Mitsutaka Kusakabe (2)	28		
7 Dec	Golf Nippon Series Hitachi Cup	Tokyo	100,000,000	(Japan) Shigeki Maruyama (7)	22		
14 Dec	Daikyo Open	Okinawa	120,000,000	(Japan) Kenichi Kuboya (2)	16		

== Money list ==
The money list was based on prize money won during the season, calculated in Japanese yen.

Position	Player	Prize money (¥)
1	(Japan) Masashi Ozaki	170,847,633
2	(Japan) Shigeki Maruyama	152,774,420
3	(United States) Brian Watts	111,153,198
4	(Japan) Naomichi Ozaki	96,994,361
5	(Japan) Tateo Ozaki	77,555,311

== Japan Challenge Tour ==
1997 Japan Challenge Tour season
- Duration: 27 March 1997 – 20 November 1997
- Number of official events: 14
- Most wins: (Japan) Hiroyuki Fujita (2) (Japan) Shoichi Yamamoto (2)

The 1997 Japan Challenge Tour was the 13th season of the Japan Challenge Tour, the official development tour to the PGA of Japan Tour.

=== Schedule ===
The following table lists official events during the 1997 season.

Date	Tournament	Location	Purse (¥)	Winner (Note: The number in brackets after each winner's name is the number of Japan Challenge Tour events they had won up to and including that tournament. It is rare for someone to accumulate many wins on the Japan Challenge Tour as success at this level usually leads to promotion to the PGA of Japan Tour.)
28 Mar	Sanko 72 Open	Gunma	10,000,000	(Japan) Hiroshi Tominaga (1)
17 Apr	Korakuen Cup (1st)	Ibaraki	10,000,000	(Japan) Shoichi Yamamoto (1)
25 Apr	Nishino Cup in Central	Ibaraki	10,000,000	(Japan) Toshiaki Odate (1)
8 May	Kabaya Ohayo Cup	Shizuoka	10,000,000	(Japan) Minoru Kawahara (1)
30 May	Daiwa Cup Kochi Open	Kochi	10,000,000	(Japan) Go Higaki (1)
5 Jun	Mito Green Open	Ibaraki	10,000,000	(Japan) Hiroyuki Fujita (1)
26 Jun	Korakuen Cup (2nd)	Hokkaido	10,000,000	(Japan) Yoshikatsu Saito (2)
26 Jul	Twin Fields Cup	Ishikawa	10,000,000	(Japan) Hiroyuki Fujita (2)
30 Jul	Komatsu Country Cup	Ishikawa	10,000,000	(Australia) Richard Backwell (1)
12 Sep	World Wood Golf Club Cup	Aichi	10,000,000	(Japan) Kunihiko Masuda (1)
2 Oct	Matsugamine Open	Niigata	10,000,000	(Japan) Shoichi Yamamoto (2)
9 Oct	Korakuen Cup (3rd)	Oita	10,000,000	(Japan) Yukio Noguchi (3)
23 Oct	Daiwa Cup Yamanashi Open	Yamanashi	10,000,000	(Japan) Shuichi Sano (1)
20 Nov	Korakuen Cup (4th)	Tochigi	10,000,000	(Japan) Takanori Hano (1)
