= Sanpo Classic =

Tournament information
- Location: Ichihara, Chiba, Japan
- Established: 1972
- Course: Asahi Country Club
- Par: 72
- Tour: Japan Golf Tour
- Format: Stroke play
- Prize fund: ¥20,000,000
- Month played: September
- Final year: 1978

Tournament record score
- Aggregate: 269 Namio Takasu (1973)
- To par: −19 as above

Final champion
- (Japan) Koichi Uehara

Location map
- Location in Japan Asahi Country Club (Chiba Prefecture)

The Sanpo Classic (産報クラシック, Sanhō kurashikku) was a professional golf tournament in Japan. Founded in 1972, it was an event on the Japan Golf Tour from its inaugural season in 1973. It was held at the Asahi Country Club near Ichihara, Chiba.

== Winners ==
Year	Winner	Score	To par	Margin of victory	Runner(s)-up	Ref.
1978	(Japan) Koichi Uehara	274	−14	4 strokes	(Japan) Haruo Yasuda	
1977	(Japan) Shigeru Uchida	281	−7	4 strokes	(Japan) Tōru Nakamura	
1976	(Japan) Masashi Ozaki	272	−16	1 stroke	(Taiwan) Lu Liang-Huan	
1975	(Australia) Bill Dunk	273	−15	2 strokes	(United States) Lon Hinkle	
1974	(Japan) Isao Aoki	276	−12	3 strokes	(Taiwan) Kuo Chie-Hsiung (Japan) Masashi Ozaki	
1973	(Japan) Namio Takasu	269	−19	3 strokes	(Australia) Graham Marsh (Japan) Takaaki Kono	
1972	(Japan) Haruo Yasuda	273	−15	1 stroke	(Japan) Kosaku Shimada	
