= Shozo Miyamoto =

Japanese professional golfer (born 1940)

Personal information
- Nationality: Japan
- Born: 1 March 1940 (age 86) Osaka Prefecture, Japan
- Height: 1.65 m (5 ft 5 in)
- Weight: 60 kg (130 lb; 9.4 st)

Career
- Sport: Golf
- Status: Professional
- Former tour: Japan Golf Tour
- Professional wins: 4

Number of wins by tour
- Japan Golf Tour: 2
- Other: 2

Shozo Miyamoto (born 1 March 1940) is a Japanese professional golfer.

== Career ==
Miyamoto played on the Japan Golf Tour, winning twice.

== Professional wins (4) ==
=== PGA of Japan Tour wins (2) ===
No.	Date	Tournament	Winning score	Margin of victory	Runner(s)-up
1	2 Jun 1974	Sports Shinko International	+1 (71-73-72-73=289)	2 strokes	(Japan) Haruo Yasuda
2	7 Aug 1983	Descente Cup Hokkoku Open	−5 (69-72-69-73=283)	3 strokes	(Taiwan) Hsieh Yu-shu, (Taiwan) Hung Wen-neng, (Taiwan) Lu Hsi-chuen

PGA of Japan Tour playoff record (0–1)

No.	Year	Tournament	Opponents	Result
1	1976	Pepsi-Wilson Tournament	(Australia) Brian Jones, (Australia) Graham Marsh, (Australia) Peter Thomson	Thomson won with par on fourteenth extra hole Jones eliminated by par on fourth hole Miyamoto eliminated by par on first hole

=== Other wins (2) ===
- 1966 Kansai Open
- 1967 Japan PGA Championship
