= Takemitsu Uranishi =

Japanese professional golfer (born 1940)

Personal information
- Nationality: Japan
- Born: 10 October 1940 (age 86) Kagoshima Prefecture, Japan
- Height: 1.80 m (5 ft 11 in)
- Weight: 74 kg (163 lb; 11.7 st)

Career
- Sport: Golf
- Status: Professional
- Former tour: Japan Golf Tour
- Professional wins: 2

Number of wins by tour
- Japan Golf Tour: 1
- Other: 1

Takemitsu Uranishi (born 10 October 1940) is a Japanese professional golfer.

== Professional career ==
Uranishi played on the Japan Golf Tour, winning once.

== Professional wins (1) ==
=== PGA of Japan Tour wins (1) ===
No.	Date	Tournament	Winning score	Margin of victory	Runners-up
1	28 Sep 1980	Kansai Open	−4 (75-71-72-66=284)	6 strokes	(Japan) Tōru Nakamura, (Japan) Kosaku Shimada

=== Other wins ===
- 1979 Wakayama Open

== See also ==
- List of male golfers
