= Hideki Kase =

Japanese professional golfer

Personal information
- Nationality: Japan
- Born: 1 December 1959 (age 66) Chiba Prefecture, Japan
- Height: 1.83 m (6 ft 0 in)
- Weight: 87 kg (192 lb; 13.7 st)

Career
- Sport: Golf
- Turned professional: 1983
- Current tour: Japan Golf Tour
- Former tour: PGA Tour
- Professional wins: 20

Number of wins by tour
- Japan Golf Tour: 4
- Other: 16

Best results in major championships
- Masters Tournament: DNP
- PGA Championship: DNP
- U.S. Open: T28: 1997
- The Open Championship: DNP

Hideki Kase (born 1 December 1959) is a Japanese professional golfer.

== Career ==
Kase played on the Japan Golf Tour, winning four times. He also played on the PGA Tour in 1997 where his best finish was 15th at the Sprint International.

== Professional wins (20) ==
=== Japan Golf Tour wins (4) ===
No.	Date	Tournament	Winning score	Margin of victory	Runner(s)-up
1	5 Aug 1990	Japan PGA Championship	−14 (71-66-67-70=274)	5 strokes	(Japan) Saburo Fujiki, (Japan) Masahiro Kuramoto
2	11 Dec 1994	Daikyo Open	−16 (69-66-66-67=268)	1 stroke	(Japan) Seiji Ebihara, (Japan) Masahiro Kuramoto, (Japan) Ken Kusumoto
3	14 Jul 1996	Nikkei Cup Torakichi Nakamura Memorial	−17 (69-71-68-63=271)	2 strokes	(Taiwan) Lin Keng-chi
4	12 Sep 2004	Suntory Open	−17 (69-67-66-65=267)	3 strokes	(Japan) Tomohiro Kondo, (Japan) Katsuya Nakagawa, (Japan) Taichi Teshima

Japan Golf Tour playoff record (0–2)

No.	Year	Tournament	Opponents	Result
1	1991	Fujisankei Classic	(Japan) Isao Aoki, (Japan) Saburo Fujiki, (Australia) Brian Jones	Fujiki won with birdie on second extra hole
2	2001	Hisamitsu-KBC Augusta	(Japan) Shigemasa Higaki, (Japan) Takenori Hiraishi	Hiraishi won with birdie on fourth extra hole Kase eliminated by birdie on first hole

=== Other wins (8) ===
- 1983 Mizuno Pro Rookies Tournament
- 1985 Wakayama Open
- 1989 Masaaki Hirao Pro-Am
- 1990 Sanko Grand Summer Championship, Masaaki Hirao Pro-Am, KSD Pro-Am
- 1995 Mitsubishi Oil Cup Masaaki Hirao Pro-Am
- 2014 Hokkaido Open

=== Japan Senior Golf Tour wins (3) ===
- 2010 Japan PGA Senior Championship
- 2014 ISPS Handa Cup Philanthropy Senior Tournament
- 2017 Sevenhills Cup KBC Senior Open

=== Other senior wins (5) ===
- 2010 Asahi Midoriken Cup 12th TVQ Senior Open Golf
- 2016 Northern Kanto Senior Open, Asahi Midoriken Cup TVQ Senior Open
- 2019 UNITEX Pro-Am, Uniden Grand Senior Championship

== Team appearances ==
- Four Tours World Championship (representing Japan): 1990, 1991
- Dunhill Cup (representing Japan): 1995
- Dynasty Cup (representing Japan): 2005

== See also ==
- 1996 PGA Tour Qualifying School graduates
