= Takenori Hiraishi =

Japanese golfer

Personal information
- Nationality: Japan
- Born: 26 February 1960 (age 66) Hyōgo Prefecture, Japan
- Height: 1.80 m (5 ft 11 in)
- Weight: 88 kg (194 lb; 13.9 st)

Career
- Sport: Golf
- Turned professional: 1983
- Former tour: Japan Golf Tour
- Professional wins: 4

Number of wins by tour
- Japan Golf Tour: 1
- Other: 3

Takenori Hiraishi (born 26 February 1960) is a Japanese professional golfer.

== Career ==
Hiraishi played on the Japan Golf Tour, winning once.

== Professional wins (4) ==
=== Japan Golf Tour wins (1) ===
No.	Date	Tournament	Winning score	Margin of victory	Runners-up
1	26 Aug 2001	Hisamitsu-KBC Augusta	−15 (67-69-68-69=273)	Playoff	(Japan) Shigemasa Higaki, (Japan) Hideki Kase

Japan Golf Tour playoff record (1–0)

No.	Year	Tournament	Opponents	Result
1	2001	Hisamitsu-KBC Augusta	(Japan) Shigemasa Higaki, (Japan) Hideki Kase	Won with birdie on fourth extra hole Kase eliminated by birdie on first hole

=== Other wins (2) ===
- 1996 Kansai Open
- 1999 Kansai Open

=== Japan PGA Senior Tour wins (1) ===
- 2015 Japan Senior Open
