= Teruo Sugihara =

Japanese golfer (1937–2011)

Teruo Sugihara 杉原輝雄
Personal information
- Nationality: Japan
- Born: 14 June 1937 Ibaraki, Osaka, Japan
- Died: 28 December 2011 (aged 74) Osaka Prefecture, Japan
- Height: 1.62 m (5 ft 4 in)
- Weight: 60 kg (132 lb; 9 st 6 lb)

Career
- Sport: Golf
- Turned professional: 1957
- Former tour: Japan Golf Tour
- Professional wins: 59

Number of wins by tour
- Japan Golf Tour: 28 (7th all-time)
- Other: 31

Best results in major championships
- Masters Tournament: DNP
- PGA Championship: DNP
- U.S. Open: DNP
- The Open Championship: CUT: 1978

Teruo Sugihara (杉原 輝雄, Sugihara Teruo; 14 June 1937 – 28 December 2011) was a Japanese professional golfer.

== Career ==
Sugihara was born in Osaka. He won 28 tournaments and over ¥630 million on the Japan Golf Tour. He also won the 1969 Hong Kong Open.

== Professional wins (60) ==
=== PGA of Japan Tour wins (28) ===
No.	Date	Tournament	Winning score	Margin of victory	Runner(s)-up
1	19 Jul 1973	Kansai Open	−15 (69-68-68-68=273)		
2	7 Oct 1973	Golf Digest Tournament	−14 (69-68-66-71=274)	2 strokes	(Japan) Tōru Nakamura
3	11 Jul 1974	Kansai Open (2)	−1 (70-70-75-72=287)	4 strokes	(Japan) Yoshitaka Yamamoto
4	1 Dec 1974	ABC Japan vs USA Golf Matches	−7 (73-68-68=209)	1 stroke	(United States) Hubert Green
5	9 Feb 1975	JPGA East-West Match	−2 (74-69-71=214)	2 strokes	(Japan) Kikuo Arai, (Japan) Namio Takasu
6	20 Apr 1975	Sobu International Open^{1}	−6 (71-74-69-68=282)	2 strokes	(Australia) Ted Ball, (Taiwan) Hsu Sheng-san, (Japan) Hideyo Sugimoto
7	19 Jul 1975	Kansai Open (3)	−9 (69-70-71-69=279)	6 strokes	(Japan) Yoshitaka Yamamoto
8	3 Jul 1977	ANA Sapporo Open	−1 (72-71-72-72=287)	1 stroke	(Japan) Yasuhiro Miyamoto
9	2 Jul 1978	ANA Sapporo Open (2)	−4 (68-72-72-72=284)	1 stroke	(Japan) Fujio Kobayashi
10	6 Aug 1978	Kansai Pro Championship	−3 (71-73-69-72=285)	1 stroke	(Japan) Yasuhiro Miyamoto
11	27 May 1979	Yomiuri Open	−5 (72-71-71-73=287)	Playoff	(Japan) Masashi Ozaki
12	29 Jun 1980	Kansai Pro Championship (2)	+2 (75-70-74-71=290)	Playoff	(Japan) Akio Kanemoto
13	14 Sep 1980	ANA Sapporo Open (3)	−5 (71-71-72-69=283)	1 stroke	(Japan) Kikuo Arai
14	19 Oct 1980	Golf Digest Tournament (2)	−13 (67-66-70-72=275)	2 strokes	(Japan) Isao Aoki
15	7 Jun 1981	Tohoku Classic	−7 (70-69-71-71=281)	4 strokes	(Japan) Shozo Miyamoto
16	27 Jun 1982	Mizuno Tournament	−6 (70-68-71-73=282)	Playoff	(Japan) Yutaka Hagawa
17	22 Aug 1982	Nihon Kokudo Keikaku Summers	−13 (65-69-70-71=275)	5 strokes	(Japan) Isao Isozaki, (Japan) Norio Suzuki
18	5 Sep 1982	Kansai Open (4)	−3 (72-68-75-70=285)	4 strokes	(Japan) Tōru Nakamura
19	3 Oct 1982	Gene Sarazen Jun Classic (4)	−13 (69-70-70-66=275)	3 strokes	(Japan) Norio Suzuki
20	17 Jul 1983	Descente Osaka Open	−13 (64-67=131)	6 strokes	(Japan) Akio Toyoda, (Japan) Shigeru Uchida
21	1 Jul 1984	Kansai Pro Championship (3)	−17 (65-66-71-69=271)		
22	16 Jun 1985	Sapporo Tokyu Open	−8 (70-65-70-75=280)	Playoff	(Japan) Kinpachi Yoshimura
23	8 Jun 1986	Tohoku Classic (2)	−8 (70-69-70-71=280)	2 strokes	(Japan) Namio Takasu
24	6 Jul 1986	Kansai Pro Championship (4)	−13 (68-68-67=203)*	2 strokes	(Japan) Hiroshi Ishii, (Japan) Kinpachi Yoshimura
25	27 Aug 1989	Daiwa KBC Augusta	−7 (70-72-71-68=281)	2 strokes	(Australia) Graham Marsh
26	15 Apr 1990	Bridgestone Aso Open	−3 (68-71-74=213)*	2 strokes	(Japan) Nobumitsu Yuhara
27	2 Sep 1990	Kansai Open (5)	−6 (71-67-71-73=282)	1 stroke	(Japan) Yuzo Oyama
28	9 Dec 1990	Daikyo Open	−15 (67-68-69-69=273)	1 stroke	(Japan) Seiki Okuda

*Note: Tournament shortened to 54 holes due to rain.
^{1}Co-sanctioned by the Asia Golf Circuit

PGA of Japan Tour playoff record (4–6)

No.	Year	Tournament	Opponent(s)	Result
1	1976	Tokai Classic	(Japan) Isao Aoki, (Japan) Shigeru Uchida	Aoki won with birdie on first extra hole
2	1979	Yomiuri Open	(Japan) Masashi Ozaki	Won with birdie on second extra hole
3	1980	Kansai Pro Championship	(Japan) Akio Kanemoto	Won with par on fifth extra hole
4	1981	Mitsubishi Galant Tournament	(Taiwan) Lu Hsi-chuen, (Japan) Tōru Nakamura	Lu won with birdie on first extra hole
5	1982	Mitsubishi Galant Tournament	(Australia) Graham Marsh	Lost to par on first extra hole
6	1982	Mizuno Tournament	(Japan) Yutaka Hagawa	Won with birdie on second extra hole
7	1983	Kuzuha Kokusai Tournament	(Japan) Kikuo Arai, (United States) David Ishii	Arai won with par on fourth extra hole Sugihara eliminated by par on second hole
8	1985	Sapporo Tokyu Open	(Japan) Kinpachi Yoshimura	Won with par on first extra hole
9	1986	Shizuoka Open	(Japan) Akiyoshi Ohmachi	Lost to par on fourth extra hole
10	1990	Dunlop Open	(Philippines) Frankie Miñoza	Lost to birdie on second extra hole

=== Asia Golf Circuit wins (2) ===
No.	Date	Tournament	Winning score	Margin of victory	Runner(s)-up
1	30 Mar 1969	Hong Kong Open	−6 (71-68-69-66=274)	2 strokes	(England) Maurice Bembridge
2	20 Apr 1975	Sobu International Open^{1}	−6 (71-74-69-68=282)	2 strokes	(Australia) Ted Ball, (Taiwan) Hsu Sheng-san, (Japan) Hideyo Sugimoto

^{1}Co-sanctioned by the PGA of Japan Tour

Asia Golf Circuit playoff record (0–1)

No.	Year	Tournament	Opponent	Result
1	1990	Dunlop Open	(Philippines) Frankie Miñoza	Lost to birdie on second extra hole

=== Other wins (30) ===
this list is probably incomplete

- 1962 Japan Open
- 1963 Big4 Golf
- 1964 Chunichi Crowns, Kansai Pro Championship, Kansai Open, All Nippon Pro-Am
- 1965 Nippon Series, Kansai Pro Championship, Kansai Open, Kuzuha International (tie with Toichiro Toda)
- 1966 Kansai Best Pro
- 1967 Kansai Pro Championship, Kuzuha International, All Nippon Top Pro, Setouchi Series Okayama leg
- 1968 Kansai Open, Japan Pro Best 10, Setouchi Series Hiroshima leg
- 1969 Setonaikai series Hiroshima leg, Setonaikai series Shido leg, Setonaikai Series Tamano leg
- 1970 Nippon Series, Setonaikai Series Kurashiki leg, Kansai Pro Championship
- 1971 Kansai Open
- 1972 Kansai Pro Championship
- 1973 Nippon Series
- 1974 Wizard Tournament, Grand Monarch
- 1982 Descente Osaka Open

=== Senior wins (4) ===
- 1989 Japan PGA Senior Championship
- 1992 Japan PGA Senior Championship
- 1993 Kansai Pro Senior
- 1995 Japan PGA Senior Championship

== See also ==
- List of golfers with most Japan Golf Tour wins
