= Mitsuo Harada =

Japanese professional golfer

Personal information
- Nationality: Japan
- Born: 15 January 1964 (age 62) Tokushima Prefecture, Japan
- Height: 1.75 m (5 ft 9 in)
- Weight: 72 kg (159 lb; 11.3 st)

Career
- Sport: Golf
- Status: Professional
- Current tour: Japan Golf Tour
- Professional wins: 2

Number of wins by tour
- Japan Golf Tour: 1
- Other: 1

Mitsuo Harada (born 15 January 1964) is a Japanese professional golfer.

== Career ==
Harada played on the Japan Golf Tour, winning once.

== Professional wins (2) ==
=== PGA of Japan Tour wins (1) ===
| No. | Date | Tournament | Winning score | Margin of victory | Runner-up |
|---|---|---|---|---|---|
| 1 | 20 Apr 1997 | Tsuruya Open | −9 (72-67-72-68=279) | 4 strokes | (Japan) Shigeki Maruyama |

=== Japan Challenge Tour wins (1) ===
| No. | Date | Tournament | Winning score | Margin of victory | Runner-up |
|---|---|---|---|---|---|
| 1 | 25 Jun 2004 | PGA Cup Challenge Tournament | −12 (66-66=132) | 4 strokes | (South Korea) Kang Ji-man |

== Team appearances ==
- World Cup (representing Japan): 1999
