= Masanobu Kimura =

Japanese professional golfer

Personal information
- Nationality: Japan
- Born: 23 January 1960 (age 66) Osaka Prefecture, Japan
- Height: 1.80 m (5 ft 11 in)
- Weight: 76 kg (168 lb; 12.0 st)

Career
- Sport: Golf
- Status: Professional
- Former tour: Japan Golf Tour
- Professional wins: 5

Number of wins by tour
- Japan Golf Tour: 4

Masanobu Kimura (木村 政信, Kimura Masanobu; born 23 January 1960) is a Japanese professional golfer.

== Career ==
Kimura played on the Japan Golf Tour, winning four times.

== Professional wins (4) ==
=== PGA of Japan Tour wins (3) ===
No.	Date	Tournament	Winning score	Margin of victory	Runner(s)-up
1	6 Sep 1987	Kansai Open	+4 (72-71-74-75=292)	2 strokes	(Japan) Tōru Nakamura
2	31 Mar 1991	KSB Open	−15 (69-66-69-69=273)	3 strokes	(Japan) Nobuo Serizawa, (Japan) Teruo Sugihara
3	7 Apr 1996	Descente Classic Munsingwear Cup	−11 (69-66-69-69=273)	2 strokes	(Japan) Hideyuki Sato
4	6 Oct 1996	Tokai Classic	−8 (68-71-71-70=280)	1 stroke	(Japan) Kazuhiko Hosokawa, (United States) Steve Jones, (Japan) Shigeki Maruyama

=== Other wins (1) ===
- 1992 Kansai Open
