= Ikuo Shirahama =

Japanese golfer

Personal information
- Nationality: Japan
- Born: 20 December 1958 (age 67) Tokyo, Japan
- Height: 1.74 m (5 ft 9 in)
- Weight: 80 kg (180 lb; 13 st)

Career
- Sport: Golf
- Turned professional: 1979
- Current tour: Japan Golf Tour
- Professional wins: 3

Number of wins by tour
- Japan Golf Tour: 2
- Other: 1

Ikuo Shirahama (born 20 December 1958) is a Japanese professional golfer.

== Career ==
Shirahama played on the Japan Golf Tour, winning twice.

== Professional wins (3) ==
=== PGA of Japan Tour wins (2) ===
No.	Date	Tournament	Winning score	Margin of victory	Runner(s)-up
1	8 May 1988	Fujisankei Classic	−4 (71-71-70-68=280)	2 strokes	(Japan) Nobumitsu Yuhara
2	24 Oct 1993	Bridgestone Open	−17 (68-69-69-65=271)	5 strokes	(United States) Mark Calcavecchia, (United States) Nolan Henke, (Japan) Tsukasa Watanabe

=== Japan PGA Senior Tour wins (1) ===
- 2011 Koujun Classic Senior Tournament
