= Toshiharu Kawada =

Japanese professional golfer (born 1947)

Personal information
- Nationality: Japan
- Born: 16 December 1947 (age 78)
- Height: 1.68 m (5 ft 6 in)
- Weight: 70 kg (150 lb; 11 st)

Career
- Sport: Golf
- Status: Professional
- Current tour: Japan Golf Tour
- Professional wins: 1

Number of wins by tour
- Japan Golf Tour: 1

Toshiharu Kawada (born 16 December 1947) is a Japanese professional golfer.

== Career ==
Kawada played on the Japan Golf Tour, winning once.

== Professional wins (1) ==
=== PGA of Japan Tour wins (1) ===
No.	Date	Tournament	Winning score	Margin of victory	Runner-up
1	10 May 1981	Fujisankei Classic	−8 (69-69-69-69=276)	2 strokes	(Japan) Isao Aoki
