= Toshiaki Odate =

Japanese professional golfer (born 1968)

Personal information
- Nationality: Japan
- Born: 8 January 1968 (age 58) Tokyo, Japan
- Height: 1.80 m (5 ft 11 in)
- Weight: 67 kg (148 lb; 10.6 st)

Career
- Sport: Golf
- College: Nihon University
- Turned professional: 1991
- Former tour: Japan Golf Tour
- Professional wins: 3

Number of wins by tour
- Japan Golf Tour: 2
- Other: 1

Best results in major championships
- Masters Tournament: DNP
- PGA Championship: DNP
- U.S. Open: DNP
- The Open Championship: CUT: 2001

Toshiaki Odate (小達 敏昭, Odate Toshiaki; born 8 January 1968) is a Japanese professional golfer.

== Career ==
Odate played on the Japan Golf Tour, and won twice.

Odate's sister, Masako Natsume, was a model and actress.

== Professional wins (3) ==
=== Japan Golf Tour wins (2) ===
No.	Date	Tournament	Winning score	Margin of victory	Runner-up
1	11 Jul 1993	Yonex Open Hiroshima	−9 (67-66-74-68=275)	Playoff	(United States) Wayne Levi
2	3 Jun 2001	JCB Classic Sendai	−9 (67-69-68-71=275)	2 strokes	(Japan) Taichi Teshima

Japan Golf Tour playoff record (1–0)

No.	Year	Tournament	Opponent	Result
1	1993	Yonex Open Hiroshima	(United States) Wayne Levi	Won with birdie on second extra hole

=== Japan Challenge Tour wins (1) ===
- 1997 Nishino Cup in Central
