= Namio Takasu =

Japanese golfer (born 1943)

Personal information
- Nationality: Japan
- Born: 24 January 1943 (age 83) Chiba Prefecture, Japan
- Height: 1.73 m (5 ft 8 in)
- Weight: 79 kg (174 lb; 12.4 st)

Career
- Sport: Golf
- Status: Professional
- Former tour: Japan Golf Tour
- Professional wins: 6

Number of wins by tour
- Japan Golf Tour: 3
- Other: 3

Namio Takasu (born 24 January 1943) is a Japanese professional golfer.

== Professional career ==
Takasu played on the Japan Golf Tour, winning three times.

== Professional wins (6) ==
=== PGA of Japan Tour wins (3) ===
No.	Date	Tournament	Winning score	Margin of victory	Runner(s)-up
1	16 Sep 1973	Sanpo Classic	−19 (69-68-62-70=269)	3 strokes	(Australia) Graham Marsh, (Japan) Takaaki Kono
2	24 May 1981	Yomiuri Open	−7 (68-70-72-75=285)	Playoff	(Taiwan) Hsieh Yung-yo
3	4 Apr 1982	Kuzuha Kokusai Tournament	−3 (35-67=102) (Note: Shortened to 27 holes due to weather.)	1 stroke	(Japan) Yoshikazu Yokoshima

PGA of Japan Tour playoff record (1–1)

No.	Year	Tournament	Opponent	Result
1	1981	Yomiuri Open	(Taiwan) Hsieh Yung-yo	Won with par on third extra hole
2	1987	Hokkaido Open	(Japan) Akihiko Kojima	

=== Other wins (2) ===
- 1974 Kuzuha Kokusai Tournament
- 1985 Toyama Open

=== Senior wins (1) ===
- 2002 Castle Hill Open

== Team appearances ==
- World Cup (representing Japan): 1982, 1984
