= Toshimitsu Kai =

Japanese golfer

Personal information
- Nationality: Japan
- Born: 27 July 1956 (age 70) Miyazaki Prefecture, Japan
- Height: 1.75 m (5 ft 9 in)
- Weight: 67 kg (148 lb; 10.6 st)

Career
- Sport: Golf
- Status: Professional
- Former tour: Japan Golf Tour
- Professional wins: 6

Number of wins by tour
- Japan Golf Tour: 2
- Other: 4

Toshimitsu Kai (born 27 July 1956) is a Japanese professional golfer.

== Career ==
Kai played on the Japan Golf Tour, winning twice.

== Professional wins (6) ==
=== PGA of Japan Tour wins (2) ===
No.	Date	Tournament	Winning score	Margin of victory	Runner-up
1	11 Apr 1982	Hakuryuko Open	−5 (73-66-74-70=283)	4 strokes	(Japan) Tsuneyuki Nakajima
2	20 Mar 1988	Shizuoka Open	−5 (71-72-72-68=283)	Playoff	(Japan) Tomohiro Maruyama

PGA of Japan Tour playoff record (1–0)

No.	Year	Tournament	Opponent	Result
1	1988	Shizuoka Open	(Japan) Tomohiro Maruyama	Won with par on third extra hole

=== Japan Challenge Tour wins (1) ===
- 1987 Sports Shinko Open

=== Other wins (3) ===
- 1979 Mizuno Pro Rookies Tournament
- 1981 KSB Kagawa Open
- 1986 Wakayama Open
