= 2001 Japan Golf Tour =

Golf tour season

2001 Japan Golf Tour season
- Duration: 8 March 2001 – 2 December 2001
- Number of official events: 31
- Most wins: (Japan) Toshimitsu Izawa (5)
- Money list: (Japan) Toshimitsu Izawa
- Most Valuable Player: (Japan) Toshimitsu Izawa
- Rookie of the Year: (Australia) Scott Laycock

The 2001 Japan Golf Tour, titled as the 2001 iiyama Tour for sponsorship reasons, was the 29th season of the Japan Golf Tour (formerly the PGA of Japan Tour), the main professional golf tour in Japan since it was formed in 1973.

It was the second season of the tour under a title sponsorship agreement with Iiyama, that began in 2000.

== Schedule ==
The following table lists official events during the 2001 season.

Date	Tournament	Location	Purse (¥)	Winner (Note: The number in brackets after each winner's name is the number of Japan Golf Tour events they had won up to and including that tournament. This information is only shown for Japan Golf Tour members.)	OWGR points	Notes
11 Mar	Token Corporation Cup	Mie	100,000,000	(Japan) Shingo Katayama (8)	16	
18 Mar	Dydo Drinco Shizuoka Open	Shizuoka	100,000,000	(Japan) Eiji Mizoguchi (2)	16	
15 Apr	Tsuruya Open	Hyōgo	100,000,000	(Japan) Hidemichi Tanaka (9)	16	
22 Apr	Asia Pacific Open Golf Championship Kirin Open	Ibaraki	100,000,000	(Japan) Shingo Katayama (9)	16	
29 Apr	The Crowns	Aichi	110,000,000	(Northern Ireland) Darren Clarke (n/a)	20	
6 May	Fujisankei Classic	Shizuoka	110,000,000	(Philippines) Frankie Miñoza (6)	16	
13 May	Japan PGA Championship	Fukuoka	110,000,000	(United States) Dean Wilson (2)	16	Japan major
20 May	Munsingwear Open KSB Cup	Hyōgo	120,000,000	(Fiji) Dinesh Chand (2)	16	
27 May	Diamond Cup Tournament	Ibaraki	100,000,000	(Japan) Toshimitsu Izawa (8)	16	
3 Jun	JCB Classic Sendai	Miyagi	100,000,000	(Japan) Toshiaki Odate (2)	16	
17 Jun	Tamanoi Yomiuri Open	Hyōgo	90,000,000	(Japan) Yoshimitsu Fukuzawa (1)	16	
24 Jun	Gateway to The Open Mizuno Open	Okayama	100,000,000	(Japan) Hidemichi Tanaka (10)	16	
1 Jul	Japan Golf Tour Championship iiyama Cup	Tochigi	120,000,000	(Japan) Katsumasa Miyamoto (3)	16	Japan major
8 Jul	Juken Sangyo Open Hiroshima	Hiroshima	90,000,000	(Japan) Keiichiro Fukabori (5)	16	
15 Jul	Aiful Cup	Aomori	90,000,000	(Taiwan) Lin Keng-chi (1)	16	
29 Jul	Sato Foods NST Niigata Open Golf Championship	Niigata	50,000,000	(Japan) Go Higaki (1)	16	
5 Aug	Sun Chlorella Classic	Hokkaidō	110,000,000	(Japan) Hiroyuki Fujita (2)	16	
26 Aug	Hisamitsu-KBC Augusta	Fukuoka	90,000,000	(Japan) Takenori Hiraishi (1)	16	
2 Sep	Japan PGA Match-Play Championship Promise Cup	Hokkaidō	80,000,000	(United States) Dean Wilson (3)	16	
9 Sep	Suntory Open	Chiba	90,000,000	(Japan) Shingo Katayama (10)	16	
16 Sep	ANA Open	Hokkaidō	100,000,000	(Taiwan) Lin Keng-chi (2)	16	
23 Sep	Mitsui Sumitomo Visa Taiheiyo Masters	Shizuoka	140,000,000	(Japan) Toshimitsu Izawa (9)	16	
30 Sep	Acom International	Ibaraki	110,000,000	(Japan) Kazuhiko Hosokawa (7)	16	
7 Oct	Georgia Tokai Classic	Aichi	120,000,000	(Japan) Toshimitsu Izawa (10)	16	
14 Oct	Japan Open Golf Championship	Saitama	120,000,000	(Japan) Taichi Teshima (2)	32	Flagship event (Note: Also a Japan major championship.)
21 Oct	Bridgestone Open	Chiba	110,000,000	(Japan) Toshimitsu Izawa (11)	16	
28 Oct	Philip Morris K.K. Championship	Hyōgo	200,000,000	(Japan) Toshimitsu Izawa (12)	16	
4 Nov	Ube Kosan Open	Yamaguchi	140,000,000	(United States) Dean Wilson (4)	16	
11 Nov	Dunlop Phoenix Tournament	Miyazaki	200,000,000	(United States) David Duval (n/a)	28	
25 Nov	Casio World Open	Kagoshima	140,000,000	(Japan) Kiyoshi Murota (4)	22	
2 Dec	Golf Nippon Series JT Cup	Tokyo	90,000,000	(Japan) Katsumasa Miyamoto (4)	16	Japan major

=== Unofficial events ===
The following events were sanctioned by the Japan Golf Tour, but did not carry official money, nor were wins official.

Date	Tournament	Location	Purse	Winner	OWGR points	Notes
8 Apr	Masters Tournament	United States	US$5,600,000	(United States) Tiger Woods	100	Major championship
18 Jun	U.S. Open	United States	US$5,000,000	(South Africa) Retief Goosen	100	Major championship
22 Jul	The Open Championship	England	£3,300,000	(United States) David Duval	100	Major championship
19 Aug	PGA Championship	United States	US$5,200,000	(United States) David Toms	100	Major championship

== Money list ==
The money list was based on prize money won during the season, calculated in Japanese yen.

Position	Player	Prize money (¥)
1	(Japan) Toshimitsu Izawa	217,934,583
2	(Japan) Shingo Katayama	133,434,850
3	(United States) Dean Wilson	118,571,075
4	(Japan) Taichi Teshima	112,356,544
5	(Japan) Toru Taniguchi	111,686,284

== Awards ==
Award	Winner	Ref.
Most Valuable Player	(Japan) Toshimitsu Izawa	
Rookie of the Year (Shimada Trophy)	(Australia) Scott Laycock	

== Japan Challenge Tour ==
2001 Japan Challenge Tour season
- Duration: 8 March 2001 – 1 November 2001
- Number of official events: 13
- Most wins: (South Korea) Hur Suk-ho (3)
- Money list: (South Korea) Hur Suk-ho

The 2001 Japan Challenge Tour was the 17th season of the Japan Challenge Tour, the official development tour to the Japan Golf Tour.

=== Schedule ===
The following table lists official events during the 2001 season.

Date	Tournament	Location	Purse (¥)	Winner (Note: The number in brackets after each winner's name is the number of Japan Challenge Tour events they had won up to and including that tournament. It is rare for someone to accumulate many wins on the Japan Challenge Tour as success at this level usually leads to promotion to the Japan Golf Tour.)
9 Mar	PRGR Cup (Cyubu)	Mie	10,000,000	(Japan) Azuma Yano (1)
13 Apr	JGTO iiyama Challenge 1	Ibaraki	10,000,000	(South Korea) Hur Suk-ho (1)
19 Apr	Kourakuen Cup (1st)	Oita	10,000,000	(Japan) Yoshiaki Mano (1)
25 May	JGTO iiyama Challenge 2	Ishikawa	10,000,000	(South Korea) Hur Suk-ho (2)
8 Jun	Aiful Challenge Cup Spring	Hyōgo	10,000,000	(Japan) Makoto Inoue (1)
5 Jul	Kourakuen Cup (2nd)	Hokkaido	10,000,000	(South Korea) Hur Suk-ho (3)
19 Jul	PRGR Cup (Kansai)	Hyōgo	10,000,000	(Japan) Naotoshi Nakamura (1)
20 Sep	Aiful Challenge Cup Autumn	Fukushima	10,000,000	(Japan) Hiroaki Iijima (1)
28 Sep	Kasco Cup	Chiba	10,000,000	(Japan) Takeshi Ohyama (2)
5 Oct	PRGR Cup (Kanto)	Tochigi	10,000,000	(Japan) Azuma Yano (2)
19 Oct	Shinwa Golf Classic	Gifu	10,000,000	(Japan) Hiroaki Iijima (2)
25 Oct	PGA Cup Challenge	Hiroshima	10,000,000	(Japan) Daisuke Maruyama (1)
1 Nov	Kourakuen Cup (3rd)	Chiba	10,000,000	(United States) Gregory Meyer (1)

=== Money list ===
The money list was based on prize money won during the season, calculated in Japanese yen. The top five players on the money list earned status to play on the 2002 Japan Golf Tour (iiyama Tour).

Position	Player	Prize money (¥)
1	(South Korea) Hur Suk-ho	5,150,264
2	(Japan) Hiroaki Iijima	4,329,041
3	(Japan) Azuma Yano	4,146,963
4	(Japan) Takeshi Ohyama	3,120,712
5	(United States) Gregory Meyer	3,073,860
