= Shigeo Nagashima Invitational Sega Sammy Cup =

Golf tournament in Japan

Tournament information
- Location: Chitose, Hokkaido, Japan
- Established: 2005
- Course: The North Country Golf Club
- Par: 72
- Length: 7,178 yards (6,564 m)
- Tour: Japan Golf Tour
- Format: Stroke play
- Prize fund: ¥100,000,000
- Month played: June/July
- Final year: 2024

Tournament record score
- Aggregate: 265 Jbe' Kruger (2023)
- To par: −23 as above

Final champion
- (Japan) Kensei Hirata
- Location in Japan Location in Hokkaido

The Shigeo Nagashima Invitational Sega Sammy Cup (長嶋茂雄Invitational セガサミーカップゴルフトーナメント, Nagashima shigeo inviteishonaru sega samī kappu gorufu tōnamento) was a professional golf tournament on the Japan Golf Tour. It was played annually at The North Country Golf Club near Chitose, Hokkaido from 2005 to 2024.

Shunsuke Sonoda set the original tournament record in 2013, shooting 268 (−20) a score subsequently equalled by Ryo Ishikawa in 2019. This was then beaten by Jbe' Kruger who shot 265 (−23) in 2023.

Following the announcement of the 2025 Japan Golf Tour schedule, it was confirmed that the tournament would not return in 2025.

== Winners ==
Year	Winner	Score	To Par	Margin of victory	Runner(s)-up	Purse (¥)	Winner's share (¥)
Shigeo Nagashima Invitational Sega Sammy Cup
2024	(Japan) Kensei Hirata	267	−19	3 strokes	(Japan) Satoshi Kodaira (Japan) Koshiro Maeda	100,000,000	20,000,000
2023	(South Africa) Jbe' Kruger	265	−23	3 strokes	(Japan) Naoyuki Kataoka (Australia) Anthony Quayle	150,000,000	30,000,000
2022	(Japan) Hiroshi Iwata (2)	269	−19	2 strokes	(Japan) Tomoharu Otsuki	120,000,000	24,000,000
2021	(Japan) Kazuki Higa	268	−20	2 strokes	(Japan) Kunihiro Kamii	120,000,000	24,000,000
2020	Cancelled due to the COVID-19 pandemic						
2019	(Japan) Ryo Ishikawa (2)	268	−20	4 strokes	(Philippines) Juvic Pagunsan	150,000,000	30,000,000
2018	(Australia) Brad Kennedy	204 (Note: Shortened to 54 holes due to rain.)	−12	3 strokes	(South Korea) Kim Hyung-sung	150,000,000	30,000,000
2017	(United States) Chan Kim	270	−18	1 stroke	(South Korea) Hwang Jung-gon	150,000,000	30,000,000
2016	(Japan) Hideto Tanihara	274	−14	2 strokes	(Thailand) Thanyakon Khrongpha	150,000,000	30,000,000
2015	(Japan) Hiroshi Iwata	272	−16	1 stroke	(Japan) Shugo Imahira	150,000,000	30,000,000
Nagashima Shigeo Invitational Sega Sammy Cup
2014	(Japan) Ryo Ishikawa	274	−10	Playoff	(Japan) Koumei Oda	200,000,000	40,000,000
2013	(Japan) Shunsuke Sonoda	268	−20	3 strokes	(Japan) Tomohiro Kondo (Japan) Yuki Kono	150,000,000	30,000,000
2012	(South Korea) Lee Kyoung-hoon	269	−19	2 strokes	(South Korea) Kim Hyung-sung	150,000,000	30,000,000
2011	(South Korea) Kim Kyung-tae	273	−15	4 strokes	(Japan) Ryo Ishikawa	130,000,000	26,000,000
2010	(Japan) Mamo Osanai	275	−13	Playoff	(South Korea) Cho Min-gyu (Japan) Shunsuke Sonoda	130,000,000	26,000,000
2009	(Japan) Hiroyuki Fujita	272	−16	1 stroke	(Japan) Kōki Idoki	130,000,000	26,000,000
2008	(India) Jeev Milkha Singh	275	−13	2 strokes	(Japan) Sushi Ishigaki	150,000,000	30,000,000
2007	(Japan) Toru Taniguchi	276	−12	3 strokes	(Thailand) Prom Meesawat	150,000,000	30,000,000
Sega Sammy Cup
2006	(Taiwan) Yeh Wei-tze	276	−12	4 strokes	(Japan) Hidemasa Hoshino	120,000,000	24,000,000
2005	(Taiwan) Lin Keng-chi	275	−13	1 stroke	(Japan) Kiyoshi Maita	120,000,000	24,000,000
