= Cho Min-gyu =

South Korean golfer

Personal information
- Nationality: South Korea
- Born: 8 August 1988 (age 38)
- Height: 1.70 m (5 ft 7 in)
- Weight: 72 kg (159 lb; 11.3 st)

Career
- Sport: Golf
- Turned professional: 2007
- Current tours: Japan Golf Tour; Asian Tour
- Professional wins: 2

Number of wins by tour
- Japan Golf Tour: 2

Best results in major championships
- Masters Tournament: DNP
- PGA Championship: DNP
- U.S. Open: DNP
- The Open Championship: CUT: 2022

Cho Min-gyu (Korean: 조민규; RR: Jo Mingyu; born 8 August 1988) is a South Korean professional golfer.

== Professional career ==
Cho plays on the Japan Golf Tour where he has won twice.

== Professional wins (2) ==
=== Japan Golf Tour wins (2) ===
No.	Date	Tournament	Winning score	Margin of victory	Runner(s)-up
1	21 Aug 2011	Kansai Open Golf Championship	−14 (65-68-68-69=270)	4 strokes	(Japan) Yoshikazu Haku
2	4 Sep 2016	Fujisankei Classic	−7 (66-71-68-72=277)	3 strokes	(Japan) Ryo Ishikawa, (Japan) Daisuke Kataoka, (Japan) Daisuke Maruyama, (Japan) Tadahiro Takayama

Japan Golf Tour playoff record (0–1)

No.	Year	Tournament	Opponents	Result
1	2010	Nagashima Shigeo Invitational Sega Sammy Cup	(Japan) Mamo Osanai, (Japan) Shunsuke Sonoda	Osanai won with par on fourth extra hole Sonoda eliminated by par on second hole

== Playoff record ==
Asian Tour playoff record (0–2)

No.	Year	Tournament	Opponent	Result
1	2022	Kolon Korea Open	(South Korea) Kim Min-kyu	Lost three-hole aggregate playoff; Kim: E (3-5-4=12), Cho: +1 (3-4-6=13)
2	2026	GS Caltex Maekyung Open	(South Korea) Song Min-hyuk	Lost to par on first extra hole

Korean Tour playoff record (0–2)

No.	Year	Tournament	Opponent	Result
1	2022	Kolon Korea Open	(South Korea) Kim Min-kyu	Lost three-hole aggregate playoff; Kim: E (3-5-4=12), Cho: +1 (3-4-6=13)
2	2026	GS Caltex Maekyung Open	(South Korea) Song Min-hyuk	Lost to par on first extra hole

== Results in major championships ==
Tournament	2022
Masters Tournament	
PGA Championship	
U.S. Open	
The Open Championship	CUT

Did not play

CUT = missed the half-way cut
