= Panasonic Open (Japan) =

Golf tournament in Japan

Panasonic Open Golf Championship
Tournament information
- Location: Osaka, Japan
- Established: 2008
- Course: Izumigaoka Country Club
- Par: 71
- Length: 6,967 yards (6,371 m)
- Tours: Japan Golf Tour; Asian Tour
- Format: Stroke play
- Prize fund: ¥100,000,000
- Month played: September
- Final year: 2025

Tournament record score
- Aggregate: 263 Toshinori Muto (2019); 263 Kensei Hirata (2024)
- To par: −25 Kensei Hirata (2024)

Final champion
- (Japan) Ryo Katsumata
- Location in Japan Location in the Ōsaka Prefecture

The Panasonic Open (パナソニックオープン, panasonikku ōpun) was a professional golf tournament on the Japan Golf Tour. It was co-sanctioned by the Asian Tour from 2008 to 2020. Hosted by Panasonic, the event took place for the first time in September 2008 at Ibaraki Country Club in Ibaraki, Osaka, Japan.

== Winners ==
Year	Tour(s) (Note: ASA − Asian Tour; JPN − Japan Golf Tour.)	Winner	Score	To par	Margin of victory	Runner(s)-up	Purse (¥)	Winner's share (¥)	Venue
Panasonic Open Golf Championship
2025	JPN	(Japan) Ryo Katsumata	264	−20	1 stroke	(Japan) Mikumu Horikawa (Japan) Takashi Ogiso	100,000,000	20,000,000	Izumigaoka
2024	JPN	(Japan) Kensei Hirata	263	−25	3 strokes	(Japan) Taisei Shimizu	100,000,000	20,000,000	Arima Royal
2023	JPN	(Japan) Tomoharu Otsuki	268	−20	3 strokes	(South Korea) Song Young-han (Japan) Ren Yonezawa	100,000,000	20,000,000	Onotoyo
2022	JPN	(Japan) Taiga Semikawa (a)	266	−22	1 stroke	(Japan) Aguri Iwasaki	100,000,000	20,000,000	Onotoyo
Panasonic Open
2021	JPN	(Japan) Keita Nakajima (a)	270	−18	Playoff	(Japan) Ryutaro Nagano	100,000,000	20,000,000	Joyo
Panasonic Open Golf Championship
2020	ASA, JPN	Cancelled due to the COVID-19 pandemic							
2019	ASA, JPN	(Japan) Toshinori Muto	263	−21	4 strokes	(Japan) Shugo Imahira	150,000,000	30,000,000	Higashi Hirono
2018	ASA, JPN	(India) Rahil Gangjee	270	−14	1 stroke	(South Korea) Hwang Jung-gon (South Korea) Kim Hyung-sung	150,000,000	30,000,000	Chiba (Umesato)
2017	ASA, JPN	(Japan) Kenichi Kuboya	273	−11	Playoff	(Japan) Katsumasa Miyamoto	150,000,000	30,000,000	Chiba (Umesato)
2016	ASA, JPN	(Japan) Yuta Ikeda	271	−13	3 strokes	(Australia) Marcus Fraser (South Korea) Kim Kyung-tae	150,000,000	30,000,000	Chiba (Umesato)
2014–15: No tournament
Asia-Pacific Panasonic Open
2013	ASA, JPN	(Japan) Masahiro Kawamura	275	−9	1 stroke	(South Korea) Park Sung-joon	150,000,000	30,000,000	Ibaraki (West)
2012	ASA, JPN	(Japan) Masanori Kobayashi	267	−17	1 stroke	(Japan) Koumei Oda	150,000,000	30,000,000	Higashi Hirono
2011	ASA, JPN	(Japan) Tetsuji Hiratsuka	276	−8	3 strokes	(South Korea) Hur Suk-ho (South Korea) Kim Do-hoon	150,000,000	30,000,000	Biwako (Ritto & Mikami)
2010	ASA, JPN	(Australia) Brendan Jones	207 (Note: Shortened to 54 holes due to weather.)	−6	1 stroke	(Japan) Ryuichi Oda	150,000,000	30,000,000	Rokko Kokusai (East)
2009	ASA, JPN	(Japan) Daisuke Maruyama	276	−8	4 strokes	(Japan) Yuta Ikeda (South Korea) Kim Kyung-tae (China) Liang Wenchong	150,000,000	30,000,000	Joyo
2008	ASA, JPN	(Japan) Hideto Tanihara	264	−16	1 stroke	(Japan) Azuma Yano	200,000,000	40,000,000	Ibaraki (West)
