= 2008 Japan Golf Tour =

Golf tour season

2008 Japan Golf Tour season
- Duration: 17 April 2008 – 7 December 2008
- Number of official events: 24
- Most wins: (Japan) Shingo Katayama (3) (Thailand) Prayad Marksaeng (3)
- Money list: (Japan) Shingo Katayama
- Most Valuable Player: (Japan) Shingo Katayama
- Rookie of the Year: (Japan) Ryo Ishikawa

The 2008 Japan Golf Tour was the 36th season of the Japan Golf Tour (formerly the PGA of Japan Tour), the main professional golf tour in Japan since it was formed in 1973.

== Schedule ==
The following table lists official events during the 2008 season.

Date	Tournament	Location	Purse (¥)	Winner (Note: The number in brackets after each winner's name is the number of Japan Golf Tour events they had won up to and including that tournament. This information is only shown for Japan Golf Tour members.)	OWGR points	Other tours (Note: ASA − Asian Tour.)	Notes
20 Apr	Token Homemate Cup	Mie	110,000,000	(Japan) Katsumasa Miyamoto (7)	16		
27 Apr	Tsuruya Open	Hyōgo	120,000,000	(South Korea) Hur Suk-ho (7)	16		
4 May	The Crowns	Aichi	120,000,000	(Japan) Tomohiro Kondo (4)	16		
11 May	Pine Valley Beijing Open	China	110,000,000	(Japan) Hiroyuki Fujita (6)	16	ASA	New to Japan Golf Tour
18 May	Japan PGA Championship	Gunma	130,000,000	(Japan) Shingo Katayama (24)	16		Japan major
25 May	Munsingwear Open KSB Cup	Okayama	100,000,000	(Japan) Hideto Tanihara (7)	16		
1 Jun	Mitsubishi Diamond Cup Golf	Hyōgo	110,000,000	(Thailand) Prayad Marksaeng (1)	18		
22 Jun	Gateway to The Open Mizuno Open Yomiuri Classic	Hyōgo	130,000,000	(Thailand) Prayad Marksaeng (2)	16		
6 Jul	UBS Japan Golf Tour Championship ShishidoHills	Ibaraki	150,000,000	(Japan) Hidemasa Hoshino (3)	16		Japan major
27 Jul	Nagashima Shigeo Invitational Sega Sammy Cup	Hokkaidō	150,000,000	(India) Jeev Milkha Singh (3)	16		
3 Aug	Sun Chlorella Classic	Hokkaidō	150,000,000	(Japan) Takuya Taniguchi (2)	16		
31 Aug	Vana H Cup KBC Augusta	Fukuoka	100,000,000	(Japan) Shintaro Kai (1)	16		
7 Sep	Fujisankei Classic	Yamanashi	150,000,000	(Japan) Toyokazu Fujishima (1)	16		
21 Sep	ANA Open	Hokkaidō	130,000,000	(Japan) Azuma Yano (2)	16		
28 Sep	Asia-Pacific Panasonic Open	Osaka	200,000,000	(Japan) Hideto Tanihara (8)	20	ASA	New tournament
5 Oct	Coca-Cola Tokai Classic	Aichi	120,000,000	(Japan) Toshinori Muto (2)	20		
12 Oct	Canon Open	Kanagawa	200,000,000	(Japan) Makoto Inoue (2)	16		New tournament
19 Oct	Japan Open Golf Championship	Fukuoka	200,000,000	(Japan) Shingo Katayama (25)	32		Flagship event (Note: Also a Japan major championship.)
26 Oct	Bridgestone Open	Chiba	150,000,000	(Japan) Azuma Yano (3)	16		
2 Nov	Mynavi ABC Championship	Hyōgo	150,000,000	(Japan) Ryo Ishikawa (2)	16		
9 Nov	The Championship by Lexus	Ibaraki	200,000,000	(South Korea) Hur Suk-ho (8)	18		New tournament
16 Nov	Mitsui Sumitomo Visa Taiheiyo Masters	Shizuoka	150,000,000	(Japan) Shingo Katayama (26)	22		
23 Nov	Dunlop Phoenix Tournament	Miyazaki	200,000,000	(Thailand) Prayad Marksaeng (3)	36		
30 Nov	Casio World Open	Kōchi	140,000,000	(Japan) Koumei Oda (1)	18		
7 Dec	Golf Nippon Series JT Cup	Tokyo	100,000,000	(India) Jeev Milkha Singh (4)	24		Japan major

=== Unofficial events ===
The following events were sanctioned by the Japan Golf Tour, but did not carry official money, nor were wins official.

Date	Tournament	Location	Purse (¥)	Winner(s)	OWGR points	Other tours	Notes
13 Apr	Masters Tournament	United States	US$7,500,000	(South Africa) Trevor Immelman	100		Major championship
9 May	Sponichi Cup	Chiba	6,000,000	(Japan) Shunsuke Sonoda (a)	n/a		
16 Jun	U.S. Open	United States	US$7,500,000	(United States) Tiger Woods	100		Major championship
20 Jul	The Open Championship	England	£4,200,000	(Republic of Ireland) Pádraig Harrington	100		Major championship
10 Aug	PGA Championship	United States	US$7,500,000	(Republic of Ireland) Pádraig Harrington	100		Major championship
22 Sep	Hirao Masaaki Charity Golf	Chiba	17,800,000	(Fiji) Dinesh Chand	n/a		
13 Dec	Hitachi 3Tours Championship	Chiba	80,000,000	Japan Golf Tour	n/a		Team event

== Money list ==
The money list was based on prize money won during the season, calculated in Japanese yen.

Position	Player	Prize money (¥)
1	(Japan) Shingo Katayama	180,094,895
2	(Japan) Azuma Yano	137,064,052
3	(Thailand) Prayad Marksaeng	126,430,825
4	(Japan) Hideto Tanihara	110,414,719
5	(Japan) Ryo Ishikawa	106,318,166

== Awards ==
Award	Winner	Ref.
Most Valuable Player	(Japan) Shingo Katayama	
Rookie of the Year (Shimada Trophy)	(Japan) Ryo Ishikawa	

== Japan Challenge Tour ==
2008 Japan Challenge Tour season
- Duration: 10 April 2008 – 26 October 2008
- Number of official events: 10
- Most wins: (Japan) Shigeru Nonaka (2) (Japan) Masamichi Uehira (2)
- Money list: (Japan) Masamichi Uehira

The 2008 Japan Challenge Tour was the 24th season of the Japan Challenge Tour, the official development tour to the Japan Golf Tour.

=== Schedule ===
The following table lists official events during the 2008 season.

Date	Tournament	Location	Purse (¥)	Winner (Note: The number in brackets after each winner's name is the number of Japan Challenge Tour events they had won up to and including that tournament. It is rare for someone to accumulate many wins on the Japan Challenge Tour as success at this level usually leads to promotion to the Japan Golf Tour.)
12 Apr	PRGR Cup	Chiba	15,000,000	(Japan) Tatsunori Nukaga (1)
23 May	Arita Tokyu JGTO Challenge I	Wakayama	13,000,000	(Japan) Masamichi Uehira (3)
13 Jun	Mochizuki Tokyu JGTO Challenge II	Nagano	13,000,000	(Japan) Shigeru Nonaka (1)
29 Jun	Novil Cup	Tokushima	20,000,000	(Japan) Taichiro Kiyota (3)
10 Jul	Everlife Cup Challenge Tournament	Fukuoka	10,000,000	(Japan) Yuta Ikeda (1)
26 Jul	Shizu Hills Tommy Cup	Ibaraki	15,000,000	(Japan) Hirotaro Naito (1)
12 Sep	Sunroyal GC Cup	Hyōgo	10,000,000	(Japan) Masamichi Uehira (4)
19 Sep	Srixon Challenge	Hyōgo	10,000,000	(Japan) Shigeru Nonaka (2)
26 Sep	Toshin Challenge Tournament	Mie	10,000,000	(Japan) Hiro Aoyama (1)
26 Oct	PRGR Cup Final	Chiba	15,000,000	(Japan) Hiroaki Iijima (3)

=== Money list ===
The money list was based on prize money won during the season, calculated in Japanese yen. The top six players on the money list earned status to play on the 2009 Japan Golf Tour.

Position	Player	Prize money (¥)
1	(Japan) Masamichi Uehira	6,329,033
2	(Japan) Yuta Ikeda	6,040,545
3	(Japan) Shigeru Nonaka	5,502,620
4	(Japan) Hiroaki Iijima	4,587,176
5	(Japan) Taichiro Kiyota	4,286,250
6	(Japan) Tatsunori Nukaga	3,737,039
