= Shigeru Nonaka =

Japanese professional golfer

Personal information
- Nationality: Japan
- Born: 9 October 1970 (age 56) Kanagawa Prefecture, Japan
- Height: 1.73 m (5 ft 8 in)
- Weight: 75 kg (165 lb; 11.8 st)

Career
- Sport: Golf
- Status: Professional
- Current tour: Japan Golf Tour
- Professional wins: 5

Number of wins by tour
- Japan Golf Tour: 1
- Other: 4

Shigeru Nonaka (born 9 October 1970) is a Japanese professional golfer.

== Career ==
Nonaka has played on the Japan Golf Tour and its Challenge Tour since 1999. He won twice on the Japan Challenge Tour in 2008 and once on the Japan Golf Tour in 2010.

== Professional wins (5) ==
=== Japan Golf Tour wins (1) ===
No.	Date	Tournament	Winning score	Margin of victory	Runner-up
1	22 Aug 2010	Kansai Open Golf Championship	−11 (68-65-68-68=269)	3 strokes	(Japan) Azuma Yano

=== Japan Challenge Tour wins (4) ===
No.	Date	Tournament	Winning score	Margin of victory	Runner(s)-up
1	13 Jun 2008	Mochizuki Tokyu JGTO Challenge II	−11 (67-66=133)	1 stroke	(Japan) Soushi Tajima
2	19 Sep 2008	Srixon Challenge	−7 (70-67=137)	1 stroke	(Japan) Taro Hiroi, (Japan) Hiroaki Iijima, (Japan) Koichiro Kawano
3	11 Jun 2015	ISPS Handa Global Challenge Cup	−8 (76-65-64=205)	1 stroke	(United States) Jay Choi
4	29 Sep 2017	Elite Grips Challenge	−10 (66-68=134)	1 stroke	(Japan) Takaya Onoda, (Japan) Keisuke Otawa
