= 2012 Japan Golf Tour =

Golf tour season

2012 Japan Golf Tour season
- Duration: 12 April 2012 – 2 December 2012
- Number of official events: 25
- Most wins: (Japan) Hiroyuki Fujita (4)
- Money list: (Japan) Hiroyuki Fujita
- Most Valuable Player: (Japan) Hiroyuki Fujita
- Rookie of the Year: (Japan) Yoshinori Fujimoto

The 2012 Japan Golf Tour was the 40th season of the Japan Golf Tour (formerly the PGA of Japan Tour), the main professional golf tour in Japan since it was formed in 1973.

== Schedule ==
The following table lists official events during the 2012 season.

| Date | Tournament | Location | Purse (¥) | Winner (Note: The number in brackets after each winner's name is the number of Japan Golf Tour events they had won up to and including that tournament. This information is only shown for Japan Golf Tour members.) | OWGR points | Other tours (Note: ASA − Asian Tour.) | Notes |
|---|---|---|---|---|---|---|---|
| 15 Apr | Token Homemate Cup | Mie | 130,000,000 | (Australia) Brendan Jones (11) | 18 | | |
| 22 Apr | Tsuruya Open | Hyōgo | 110,000,000 | (Japan) Hiroyuki Fujita (12) | 18 | | |
| 29 Apr | The Crowns | Aichi | 120,000,000 | (South Korea) Jang Ik-jae (2) | 16 | | |
| 13 May | Japan PGA Championship Nissin Cupnoodle Cup | Tochigi | 150,000,000 | (Japan) Toru Taniguchi (18) | 16 | | Japan major |
| 20 May | Totoumi Hamamatsu Open | Shizuoka | 100,000,000 | (United States) Jay Choi (1) | 18 | | |
| 27 May | Diamond Cup Golf | Chiba | 120,000,000 | (Japan) Hiroyuki Fujita (13) | 16 | | |
| 3 Jun | Japan Golf Tour Championship Citibank Cup Shishido Hills | Ibaraki | 150,000,000 | (Japan) Yoshinori Fujimoto (1) | 16 | | Japan major |
| 24 Jun | Gateway to The Open Mizuno Open | Okayama | 110,000,000 | (Australia) Brad Kennedy (1) | 16 | | |
| 8 Jul | Nagashima Shigeo Invitational Sega Sammy Cup | Hokkaidō | 150,000,000 | (South Korea) Lee Kyoung-hoon (1) | 16 | | |
| 29 Jul | Sun Chlorella Classic | Hokkaidō | 150,000,000 | (Australia) Brendan Jones (12) | 16 | | |
| 19 Aug | Kansai Open Golf Championship | Osaka | 60,000,000 | (Japan) Toshinori Muto (5) | 16 | | |
| 26 Aug | Vana H Cup KBC Augusta | Fukuoka | 110,000,000 | (South Korea) Kim Hyung-sung (1) | 16 | | |
| 2 Sep | Fujisankei Classic | Yamanashi | 110,000,000 | (South Korea) Kim Kyung-tae (5) | 16 | | |
| 9 Sep | Toshin Golf Tournament | Mie | 80,000,000 | (China) Wu Ashun (1) | 16 | | |
| 16 Sep | ANA Open | Hokkaidō | 110,000,000 | (Japan) Hiroyuki Fujita (14) | 16 | | |
| 23 Sep | Asia-Pacific Panasonic Open | Hyōgo | 150,000,000 | (Japan) Masanori Kobayashi (2) | 20 | ASA | |
| 30 Sep | Coca-Cola Tokai Classic | Aichi | 120,000,000 | (South Korea) Ryu Hyun-woo (1) | 16 | | |
| 7 Oct | Canon Open | Kanagawa | 150,000,000 | (Japan) Yuta Ikeda (10) | 16 | | |
| 14 Oct | Japan Open Golf Championship | Okinawa | 200,000,000 | (Japan) Kenichi Kuboya (6) | 32 | | Flagship event (Note: Also a Japan major championship.) |
| 21 Oct | Bridgestone Open | Chiba | 150,000,000 | (Japan) Toru Taniguchi (19) | 16 | | |
| 28 Oct | Mynavi ABC Championship | Hyōgo | 150,000,000 | (United States) Han Lee (1) | 18 | | |
| 11 Nov | Mitsui Sumitomo Visa Taiheiyo Masters | Shizuoka | 150,000,000 | (Japan) Ryo Ishikawa (10) | 18 | | |
| 18 Nov | Dunlop Phoenix Tournament | Miyazaki | 200,000,000 | (England) Luke Donald (n/a) | 32 | | |
| 25 Nov | Casio World Open | Kōchi | 200,000,000 | (South Korea) Hwang Jung-gon (2) | 18 | | |
| 2 Dec | Golf Nippon Series JT Cup | Tokyo | 130,000,000 | (Japan) Hiroyuki Fujita (15) | 18 | | Japan major |

=== Unofficial events ===
The following events were sanctioned by the Japan Golf Tour, but did not carry official money, nor were wins official.

| Date | Tournament | Location | Purse (¥) | Winner(s) | OWGR points | Other tours | Notes |
|---|---|---|---|---|---|---|---|
| 8 Apr | Masters Tournament | United States | US$8,000,000 | (United States) Bubba Watson | 100 | | Major championship |
| 6 May | Legend Charity Pro-Am | Chiba | 38,000,000 | (Japan) Yuta Ikeda | n/a | | Pro-Am |
| 17 Jun | U.S. Open | United States | US$8,000,000 | (United States) Webb Simpson | 100 | | Major championship |
| 1 Jul | Million Yard Cup | Nagasaki | n/a | Team South Korea | n/a | | Team event |
| 22 Jul | The Open Championship | England | £5,000,000 | (South Africa) Ernie Els | 100 | | Major championship |
| 2 Aug | PGA Championship | United States | US$8,000,000 | (Northern Ireland) Rory McIlroy | 100 | | Major championship |
| 9 Dec | Hitachi 3Tours Championship | Chiba | 57,000,000 | Japan PGA Senior Tour | n/a | | Team event |

== Money list ==
The money list was based on prize money won during the season, calculated in Japanese yen.

| Position | Player | Prize money (¥) |
|---|---|---|
| 1 | (Japan) Hiroyuki Fujita | 175,159,972 |
| 2 | (Japan) Toru Taniguchi | 102,686,994 |
| 3 | (Australia) Brendan Jones | 92,078,892 |
| 4 | (Japan) Yuta Ikeda | 88,948,069 |
| 5 | (Japan) Yoshinori Fujimoto | 88,659,122 |

== Awards ==
| Award | Winner | Ref. |
|---|---|---|
| Most Valuable Player | (Japan) Hiroyuki Fujita | |
| Rookie of the Year (Shimada Trophy) | (Japan) Yoshinori Fujimoto | |

== Japan Challenge Tour ==
2012 Japan Challenge Tour season
- Duration: 29 March 2012 – 19 October 2012
- Number of official events: 13
- Most wins: (Japan) Yuki Kono (2)
- Money list: (Japan) Yuki Kono

The 2012 Japan Challenge Tour was the 28th season of the Japan Challenge Tour, the official development tour to the Japan Golf Tour.

=== Schedule ===
The following table lists official events during the 2012 season.

| Date | Tournament | Location | Purse (¥) | Winner (Note: The number in brackets after each winner's name is the number of Japan Challenge Tour events they had won up to and including that tournament. It is rare for someone to accumulate many wins on the Japan Challenge Tour as success at this level usually leads to promotion to the Japan Golf Tour.) |
|---|---|---|---|---|
| 1 Apr | Novil Cup | Tokushima | 15,000,000 | (South Korea) Yang Ji-ho (1) |
| 20 Apr | Kimisarazu GL GMA Challenge Tournament | Chiba | 10,000,000 | (Japan) Daijiro Izumida (1) |
| 25 May | Fuji Country Kani Club Challenge Cup | Gifu | 10,000,000 | (Japan) Naomi Ohta (2) |
| 1 Jun | Murasaki CC Sumire GMA Challenge Tournament | Chiba | 10,000,000 | (Japan) Akio Sadakata (1) |
| 7 Jun | ISPS Charity Challenge Tournament | Chiba | 15,000,000 | (Japan) Yosuke Asaji (1) |
| 15 Jun | Akita TV Minami Akita CC JGTO Challenge I | Akita | 10,000,000 | (Japan) Yuki Kono (1) |
| 29 Jun | Tokyu Nasu Resort JGTO Challenge II | Tochigi | 10,000,000 | (Japan) Yuki Kono (2) |
| 14 Jul | Shizu Hills Tommy Cup | Ibaraki | 15,000,000 | (Japan) Koichi Sugimoto (2) |
| 27 Jul | Daisen GC JGTO Challenge III | Tottori | 10,000,000 | (Japan) Masashi Nishimura (1) |
| 13 Sep | PGA JGTO Challenge Cup I in Onotoyo | Hyōgo | 10,000,000 | (Japan) Achi Sato (4) |
| 21 Sep | PGA JGTO Challenge Cup II in Boso | Chiba | 10,000,000 | (Japan) Satoshi Kodaira (2) |
| 228 Sep | Elite Grips JGTO Challenge IV | Mie | 10,000,000 | (Japan) Toru Morita (2) |
| 19 Oct | JGTO Novil Final | Chiba | 10,000,000 | (South Korea) Hur In-hoi (1) |

=== Money list ===
The money list was based on prize money won during the season, calculated in Japanese yen. The top eight players on the money list earned status to play on the 2013 Japan Golf Tour.

| Position | Player | Prize money (¥) |
|---|---|---|
| 1 | (Japan) Yuki Kono | 4,607,237 |
| 2 | (South Korea) Hur In-hoi | 4,369,211 |
| 3 | (South Korea) Yang Ji-ho | 4,365,325 |
| 4 | (Japan) Akio Sadakata | 3,906,933 |
| 5 | (Japan) Yosuke Tsukada | 3,376,983 |
| 6 | (Japan) Yosuke Asaji | 3,347,000 |
| 7 | (Japan) Makoto Inoue | 3,213,055 |
| 8 | (Japan) Koichi Sugimoto | 3,039,870 |
