= Yoshinobu Tsukada =

Japanese professional golfer (born 1969)

Personal information
- Nationality: Japan
- Born: 24 August 1969 (age 57) Chiba Prefecture, Japan
- Height: 1.78 m (5 ft 10 in)
- Weight: 78 kg (172 lb; 12.3 st)

Career
- Sport: Golf
- College: Southeastern Louisiana University
- Turned professional: 1998
- Current tour: Japan PGA Senior Tour
- Former tours: Japan Golf Tour; Japan Challenge Tour; Asian Tour
- Professional wins: 7

Number of wins by tour
- Japan Golf Tour: 1
- Other: 6

Best results in major championships
- Masters Tournament: DNP
- PGA Championship: DNP
- U.S. Open: CUT: 2013
- The Open Championship: CUT: 2004, 2008, 2014

Achievements and awards
- Japan Challenge Tour money list winner: 2016

Yoshinobu Tsukada (塚田好宣, Tsukada Yoshinobu; born 24 August 1969) is a Japanese professional golfer.

== Career ==
Tsukada plays on the Japan Golf Tour and the Asian Tour. His best finish on the Japan Golf Tour is a win at the 2013 Token Homemate Cup. His best finish on the Asian Tour is T-2 at the 2009 Queen's Cup. He won two events on the Japan Challenge Tour in 2016 and led the money list.

== Professional wins (7) ==
=== Japan Golf Tour wins (1) ===
| No. | Date | Tournament | Winning score | Margin of victory | Runners-up |
|---|---|---|---|---|---|
| 1 | 21 Apr 2013 | Token Homemate Cup | −9 (72-71-63-69=275) | 4 strokes | (Japan) Kunihiro Kamii, (Japan) Koumei Oda |

=== Japan Challenge Tour wins (2) ===
| No. | Date | Tournament | Winning score | Margin of victory | Runner(s)-up |
|---|---|---|---|---|---|
| 1 | 29 Apr 2016 | Fuji Home Service Challenge Cup | −6 (66-72=138) | Playoff | (Japan) Jinichiro Kozuma |
| 2 | 8 Oct 2016 | Everyone Project Challenge Golf Tournament | −5 (68-71=139) | 1 stroke | (United States) Jay Choi, (Japan) Makoto Inoue, (Japan) Shohei Karimata, (Japan) Keisuke Kondo, (Japan) Daisuke Maruyama, (Japan) Masato Takada |

=== Japan PGA Senior Tour wins (4) ===
| No. | Date | Tournament | Winning score | Margin of victory | Runner-up |
|---|---|---|---|---|---|
| 1 | 9 Apr 2022 | Kanehide Senior Okinawa Open | −7 (70-70-69=209) | 1 stroke | (Japan) Taichi Teshima |
| 2 | 15 Oct 2023 | Trust Group Cup Sasebo Senior Open | −11 (67-66=133) | Playoff | (Japan) Naoyuki Tamura |
| 3 | 3 Nov 2023 | Cosmohealth Cup Senior | −10 (67-67=134) | 1 stroke | (Japan) Keiichiro Fukabori |
| 4 | 24 Nov 2024 | Iwasaki Shiratsuyu Senior | −12 (71-64-69=204) | Playoff | (Thailand) Thammanoon Sriroj |

== Results in major championships ==
| Tournament | 2004 | 2005 | 2006 | 2007 | 2008 | 2009 | 2010 | 2011 | 2012 | 2013 | 2014 |
|---|---|---|---|---|---|---|---|---|---|---|---|
| U.S. Open | | | | | | | | | | CUT | |
| The Open Championship | CUT | | | | CUT | | | | | | CUT |

Did not play

CUT = missed the halfway cut
Note: Tsukada never played in the Masters Tournament or the PGA Championship.
