= Soushi Tajima =

Japanese golfer

Personal information
- Nationality: Japan
- Born: 25 September 1976 (age 50) Gunma Prefecture, Japan
- Height: 1.71 m (5 ft 7 in)
- Weight: 70 kg (150 lb; 11 st)

Career
- Sport: Golf
- Status: Professional
- Current tour: Japan Golf Tour
- Professional wins: 3

Number of wins by tour
- Japan Golf Tour: 1
- Other: 2

Soushi Tajima (born 25 September 1976) is a Japanese professional golfer.

== Professional career ==
Tajima plays on the Japan Golf Tour. He has one victory on the main tour which came at the 2003 Hisamitsu-KBC Augusta.

He has also won twice on the Japan Challenge Tour.

== Professional wins (3) ==
=== Japan Golf Tour wins (1) ===
No.	Date	Tournament	Winning score	Margin of victory	Runners-up
1	31 Aug 2003	Hisamitsu-KBC Augusta	−19 (64-70-68-67=269)	4 strokes	(Fiji) Dinesh Chand, (Japan) Hisayuki Sasaki

=== Japan Challenge Tour wins (2) ===
No.	Date	Tournament	Winning score	Margin of victory	Runner-up
1	11 Apr 2010	Novil Cup	−9 (70-71-66=207)	2 strokes	(Japan) Tatsuya Mitsuhashi
2	6 Apr 2014	Novil Cup (2)	−3 (77-67-69=213)	1 stroke	(Japan) Tadahisa Inoue
