= Masanori Kobayashi =

Japanese professional golfer

Masanori Kobayashi 小林正則
Personal information
- Nationality: Japan
- Born: 14 February 1976 (age 50) Chiba Prefecture, Japan
- Height: 1.86 m (6 ft 1 in)
- Weight: 79 kg (174 lb; 12.4 st)

Career
- Sport: Golf
- Turned professional: 1998
- Former tours: Japan Golf Tour; Asian Tour; Japan Challenge Tour
- Professional wins: 6

Number of wins by tour
- Japan Golf Tour: 3
- Asian Tour: 1
- Other: 3

Best results in major championships
- Masters Tournament: DNP
- PGA Championship: DNP
- U.S. Open: DNP
- The Open Championship: CUT: 2014, 2018

Achievements and awards
- Japan Challenge Tour money list winner: 2000
- Asian Tour Rookie of the Year: 2012

Masanori Kobayashi (小林正則, Kobayashi Masanori; born 14 February 1976) is a Japanese professional golfer.

== Career ==
Kobayashi has played on the Japan Golf Tour since 1999. He won his first title in 2011 at the Totoumi Hamamatsu Open and his second at the Asia-Pacific Panasonic Open in 2012. He also won two events on the Japan Challenge Tour in 2000.

== Professional wins (6) ==
=== Japan Golf Tour wins (3) ===
Legend
Flagship events (1)
Japan majors (1) (Note: The 2013 Japan Open Golf Championship was also a Japan major championship.)
Other Japan Golf Tour (2)

No.	Date	Tournament	Winning score	Margin of victory	Runner-up
1	22 May 2011	Totoumi Hamamatsu Open	−20 (69-66-68-65=268)	Playoff	(Japan) Ryo Ishikawa
2	23 Sep 2012	Asia-Pacific Panasonic Open^{1}	−17 (74-64-67-62=267)	1 stroke	(Japan) Koumei Oda
3	22 Oct 2013	Japan Open Golf Championship	−10 (69-69-69-67=274)	3 strokes	(Japan) Koumei Oda

^{1}Co-sanctioned by the Asian Tour

Japan Golf Tour playoff record (1–0)

No.	Year	Tournament	Opponent	Result
1	2011	Totoumi Hamamatsu Open	(Japan) Ryo Ishikawa	Won with birdie on second extra hole

=== Asian Tour wins (1) ===
No.	Date	Tournament	Winning score	Margin of victory	Runner-up
1	23 Sep 2012	Asia-Pacific Panasonic Open^{1}	−17 (74-64-67-62=267)	1 stroke	(Japan) Koumei Oda

^{1}Co-sanctioned by the Japan Golf Tour

=== Japan Challenge Tour wins (3) ===
No.	Date	Tournament	Winning score	Margin of victory	Runners-up
1	12 May 2000	Hisamitsu Seiyaku KBC Challenge	−5 (71-68=139)	1 stroke	(Japan) Hirooki Kikkawa, (Japan) Takuya Ogawa
2	19 Jul 2000	PRGR Cup (West)	−7 (71-64=135)	4 strokes	(Japan) Tetsuji Hiratsuka, (Japan) Daisuke Maruyama, (Japan) Kimihiro Matsunaga
3	23 Sep 2022	ISPS Handa Hero ni nare! Challenge Tournament	−8 (69-67=136) (Note: Shortened to 36 holes due to weather.)	2 strokes	(Japan) Kazuya Koura, (Japan) Ren Yonezawa

== Results in major championships ==
Tournament	2014	2015	2016	2017	2018
Masters Tournament					
U.S. Open					
The Open Championship	CUT				CUT
PGA Championship					

Did not play

CUT = missed the half-way cut
"T" = tied

== Results in World Golf Championships ==
Tournament	2012
Match Play	
Championship	
Invitational	
Champions	WD

Did not play

WD = withdrew
