= Rory Hie =

Indonesian professional golfer

Personal information
- Nationality: Indonesia
- Born: 1 September 1988 (age 38) Balikpapan, East Kalimantan, Indonesia
- Height: 5 ft 10 in (178 cm)
- Weight: 176 lb (80 kg)

Career
- Sport: Golf
- College: University of Southern California
- Turned professional: 2008
- Current tour: PGA Tour of Indonesia
- Former tours: Asian Tour; OneAsia Tour; PGA Tour China; Asian Development Tour
- Professional wins: 8

Number of wins by tour
- Asian Tour: 1
- Other: 7

Rory Hie (born 1 September 1988) is an Indonesian professional golfer who plays on the Asian Tour.

== Amateur career ==
Hie was born in Balikpapan, Indonesia. He first played golf at the age of six, and went on to spend time in the United States, where he was the most sought after junior player in 2006, reaching the #1 ranked junior in the U.S. He was also inducted into the Lakewood Scholar Athlete Youth Hall of Fame (California), with various accolades in the American Junior Golf Association.

He enjoyed a successful amateur career, including playing for the golf team at the University of Southern California. He earned the First-Team NCAA All-American Honors (becoming the first Indonesian to do so), and won the Dogwood Invitational in 2008. By end of 2008, he was 2008 California Amateur Player of the Year, top 3-ranked college golfer in the US, and reached the #6 ranked amateur in the world.

== Professional career ==
Hie turned professional in 2008 and achieved his first professional win at the Mercedes International Championship in Indonesia, only one month after turning professional. He gained full playing rights on the Asian Tour, the first Indonesian player to do so.

In 2011, Hie achieved further success, by becoming the first Indonesian born player to win outside of Indonesia, at the Tangshan China PGA Championship. He also collected two runner-up finishes on the OneAsia Tour at the Indonesian PGA Championship and the Indonesia Open. He was also named Indonesia's player of the year for 2011.

In 2013, Hie won the China Tour Championship on the China Tour.

Hie's biggest success to date came in September 2019, at the Classic Golf and Country Club International Championship in India. Hie shot a 21-under par 267 for a wire-to-wire victory and bettered Rashid Khan and Kim Byung-jun by two strokes.

== Personal life ==
Hie's father; Tommy, acts as his personal coach. He has two older sisters.

== Amateur wins ==
- 2008 Dogwood Invitational

== Professional wins (8) ==
=== Asian Tour wins (1) ===
No.	Date	Tournament	Winning score	Margin of victory	Runners-up
1	15 Sep 2019	Classic Golf and Country Club International Championship^{1}	−21 (64-68-67-68=267)	2 strokes	(India) Rashid Khan, (South Korea) Kim Byung-jun

^{1}Co-sanctioned by the Professional Golf Tour of India

=== ASEAN PGA Tour wins (1) ===
No.	Date	Tournament	Winning score	Margin of victory	Runner-up
1	25 Oct 2008	International Championship	−10 (72-66-70-70=278)	3 strokes	(Indonesia) Andik Mauluddin (a)

=== PGA Tour of Indonesia wins (4) ===
No.	Date	Tournament	Winning score	Margin of victory	Runner(s)-up
1	4 May 2016	IGT 3	−10 (71-66-69=206)	Playoff	(Indonesia) Joshua Andrew Wirawan
2	9 Dec 2016	PGATI Challenge	−6 (68-70=138)	1 stroke	(Indonesia) Rinaldi Adiyandono, (Indonesia) George Gandranata
3	16 Dec 2016	BNI IGT Final	E (71-68-77=216)	4 strokes	(Indonesia) Kurnia Herisiandy
4	2 Aug 2018	Pertamina Jakarta Classic	−8 (66-70-72=208)	5 strokes	(Indonesia) Rizki Subakti (a)

=== China PGA wins (2) ===
No.	Date	Tournament	Winning score	Margin of victory	Runner-up
1	5 Sep 2011	Tangshan China PGA Championship	−15 (68-71-69-65=273)	5 strokes	(South Korea) Baek Joo-yeob
2	8 Dec 2013	China Tour Championship	E (74-72-69-73=288)	3 strokes	(China) He Zeyu
