= Toshinori Muto =

Japanese professional golfer (born 1978)

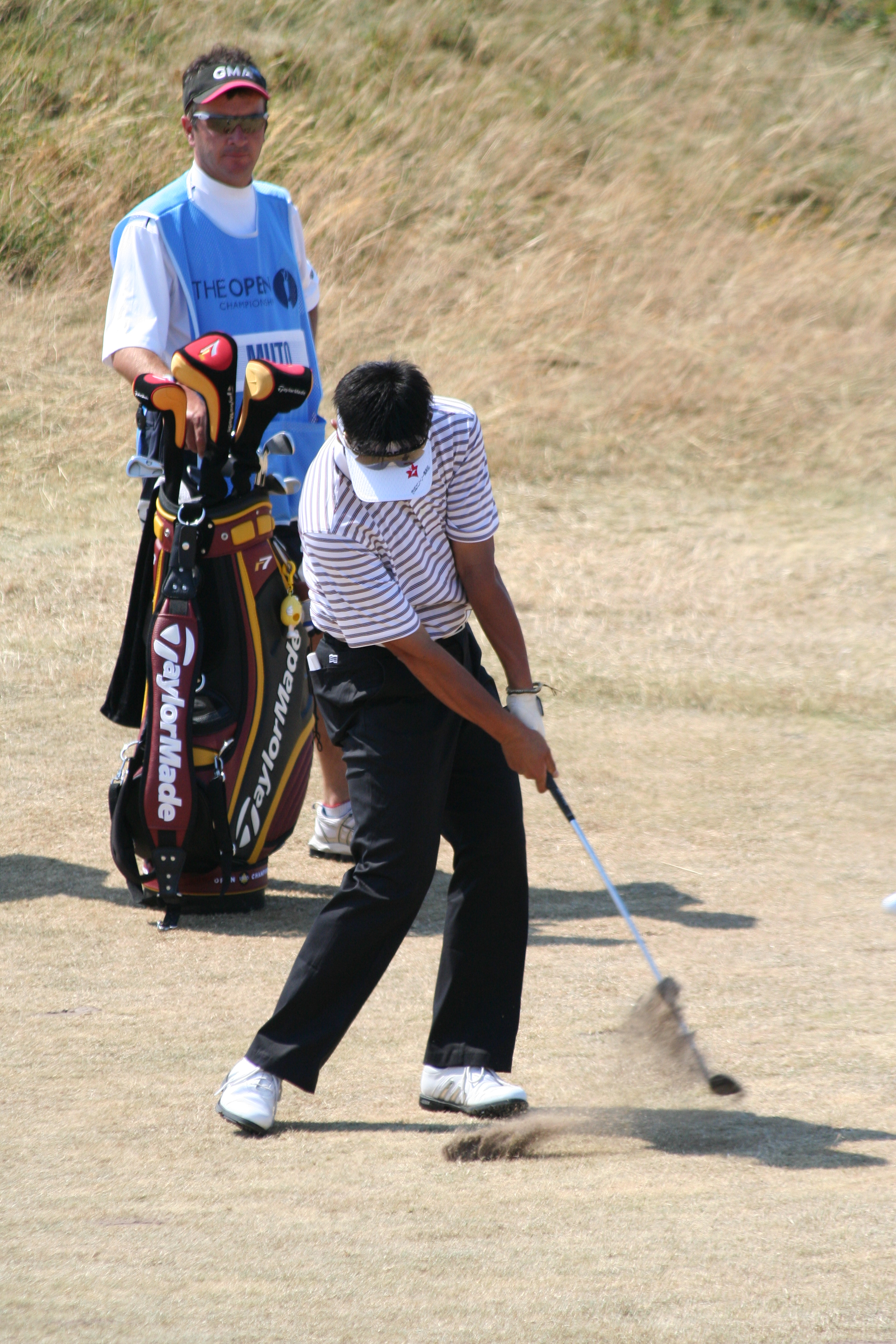
- Muto at the 2006 Open Championship

Personal information
- Nationality: Japan
- Born: 10 March 1978 (age 48) Gunma Prefecture, Japan
- Height: 1.73 m (5 ft 8 in)
- Weight: 76 kg (168 lb; 12.0 st)

Career
- Sport: Golf
- Turned professional: 2001
- Current tour: Japan Golf Tour
- Professional wins: 7

Number of wins by tour
- Japan Golf Tour: 7
- Asian Tour: 1

Best results in major championships
- Masters Tournament: DNP
- PGA Championship: DNP
- U.S. Open: DNP
- The Open Championship: T72: 2012

Toshinori Muto (born 10 March 1978) is a Japanese professional golfer.

== Career ==
Muto was born in Gunma Prefecture. He currently plays on the Japan Golf Tour where he has won seven times between 2006 and 2019.

== Professional wins (7) ==
=== Japan Golf Tour wins (7) ===
No.	Date	Tournament	Winning score	Margin of victory	Runner-up
1	21 May 2006	Munsingwear Open KSB Cup	−14 (68-69-73-64=274)	2 strokes	(Japan) Eiji Mizoguchi
2	5 Oct 2008	Coca-Cola Tokai Classic	−11 (69-70-69-69=277)	2 strokes	(Japan) Yuta Ikeda
3	8 Nov 2009	The Championship by Lexus	−16 (68-65-71-64=268)	3 strokes	(South Korea) Kim Kyung-tae
4	20 Nov 2011	Dunlop Phoenix Tournament	−12 (68-70-63=201) (Note: Shortened to 54 holes due to weather.)	4 strokes	(Spain) Gonzalo Fernández-Castaño
5	19 Aug 2012	Kansai Open Golf Championship	−18 (64-65-68-69=266)	1 stroke	(South Korea) Kim Hyung-sung
6	28 Jun 2015	ISPS Handa Global Cup	−14 (68-68-66-68=270)	Playoff	(Philippines) Angelo Que
7	29 Sep 2019	Panasonic Open Golf Championship^{1}	−21 (65-70-64-64=263)	4 strokes	(Japan) Shugo Imahira

^{1}Co-sanctioned by the Asian Tour

Japan Golf Tour playoff record (1–1)

No.	Year	Tournament	Opponent	Result
1	2015	ISPS Handa Global Cup	(Philippines) Angelo Que	Won with birdie on first extra hole
2	2016	Japan PGA Championship Nissin Cupnoodle Cup	(Japan) Hideto Tanihara	Lost to par on first extra hole

== Results in major championships ==
Tournament	2006	2007	2008	2009	2010	2011	2012
The Open Championship	CUT	CUT					T72

Note: Muto only played in The Open Championship.

Did not play

CUT = missed the half-way cut
"T" = tied

== Results in World Golf Championships ==
Tournament	2012
Match Play	
Championship	
Invitational	T67
Champions	T69

Did not play

"T" = Tied
