= Mamo Osanai =

Japanese professional golfer

Mamo Osanai 小山内 護
Personal information
- Full name: Mamoru Osanai
- Nationality: Japan
- Born: 19 June 1970 (age 56) Tokyo, Japan
- Height: 1.77 m (5 ft 10 in)
- Weight: 85 kg (187 lb; 13.4 st)

Career
- Sport: Golf
- Turned professional: 1996
- Current tour: Japan Golf Tour
- Professional wins: 4

Number of wins by tour
- Japan Golf Tour: 4

Mamoru Osanai (小山内 護, Osanai Mamoru; born 19 June 1970) is a Japanese professional golfer.

== Career ==
Osanai plays on the Japan Golf Tour, where he has won four times between 1998 and 2010.

== Professional wins (4) ==
=== Japan Golf Tour wins (4) ===
No.	Date	Tournament	Winning score	Margin of victory	Runner(s)-up
1	13 Sep 1998	Suntory Open	−10 (71-68-66-69=274)	3 strokes	(Japan) Masashi Ozaki
2	5 Sep 1999	Japan PGA Match-Play Championship Promise Cup	4 and 3		(Japan) Toru Taniguchi
3	24 Sep 2006	Acom International	−14 (65-63-74-68=270)	Playoff	(Japan) Taichi Teshima
4	25 Jul 2010	Nagashima Shigeo Invitational Sega Sammy Cup	−13 (70-69-67-69=275)	Playoff	(South Korea) Cho Min-gyu, (Japan) Shunsuke Sonoda

Japan Golf Tour playoff record (2–0)

No.	Year	Tournament	Opponent(s)	Result
1	2006	Acom International	(Japan) Taichi Teshima	Won with par on first extra hole
2	2010	Nagashima Shigeo Invitational Sega Sammy Cup	(South Korea) Cho Min-gyu, (Japan) Shunsuke Sonoda	Won with par on fourth extra hole Sonoda eliminated by par on second hole

== Team appearances ==
- World Cup (representing Japan): 1999
