= Indonesia PGA Championship =

Tournament information
- Location: Indonesia
- Course: Damai Indah Golf Club – BSD
- Par: 72
- Length: 7,160 yards (6,550 m)
- Tours: OneAsia Tour; Japan Golf Tour; Asian Tour
- Format: Stroke play
- Prize fund: US$1,000,000
- Month played: March
- Final year: 2014

Tournament record score
- Aggregate: 267 Michio Matsumura (2014)
- To par: −21 as above

Final champion
- (Japan) Michio Matsumura
- Location in Indonesia

The Indonesia PGA Championship was a golf tournament held in Indonesia. It was sanctioned by the Asian Tour in 1996 and 1997, the OneAsia tour from 2011 to 2014, and also co-sanctioned by the Japan Golf Tour in 2013 and 2014. The purse in 2014 was US$1,000,000.

== Winners ==
Year	Tour(s) (Note: AGC − Asia Golf Circuit; ASA − Asian Tour (previously known as the Omega Tour); JPN − Japan Golf Tour; ONE − OneAsia Tour.)	Winner	Score	To par	Margin of victory	Runner(s)-up	Ref.
Enjoy Jakarta Indonesia PGA Championship
2014	JPN, ONE	(Japan) Michio Matsumura	267	−21	1 stroke	(Australia) Rhein Gibson (Philippines) Juvic Pagunsan	
2013	JPN, ONE	(South Korea) Choi Ho-sung	269	−19	2 strokes	(Philippines) Juvic Pagunsan (South Korea) Song Young-han (Japan) Kaname Yokoo	
2012: No tournament
Indonesian PGA Championship
2011	ONE	(Australia) Andre Stolz	274	−14	1 stroke	(Indonesia) Rory Hie	
1998–2010: Unknown
Tugu Pratama Indonesian PGA Championship
1997	ASA	(United States) Clay Devers	276	−12	1 stroke	(United States) Mike Cunning (Eswatini) Paul Friedlander (South Korea) Kwon Young-suk	
1996	ASA	(Thailand) Thammanoon Sriroj	274	−14	2 strokes	(Singapore) Chua Guan Soon	
1995	AGC	(Australia) John Senden	279	−9	2 strokes	(Philippines) Felix Casas	
Indonesian PGA Championship
1994		(Singapore) Madasamy Murugiah	279		3 strokes	(Philippines) Felix Casas	
1993		(Australia) Wayne Grady					
