= Gaurav Ghei =

Indian professional golfer (born 1968)

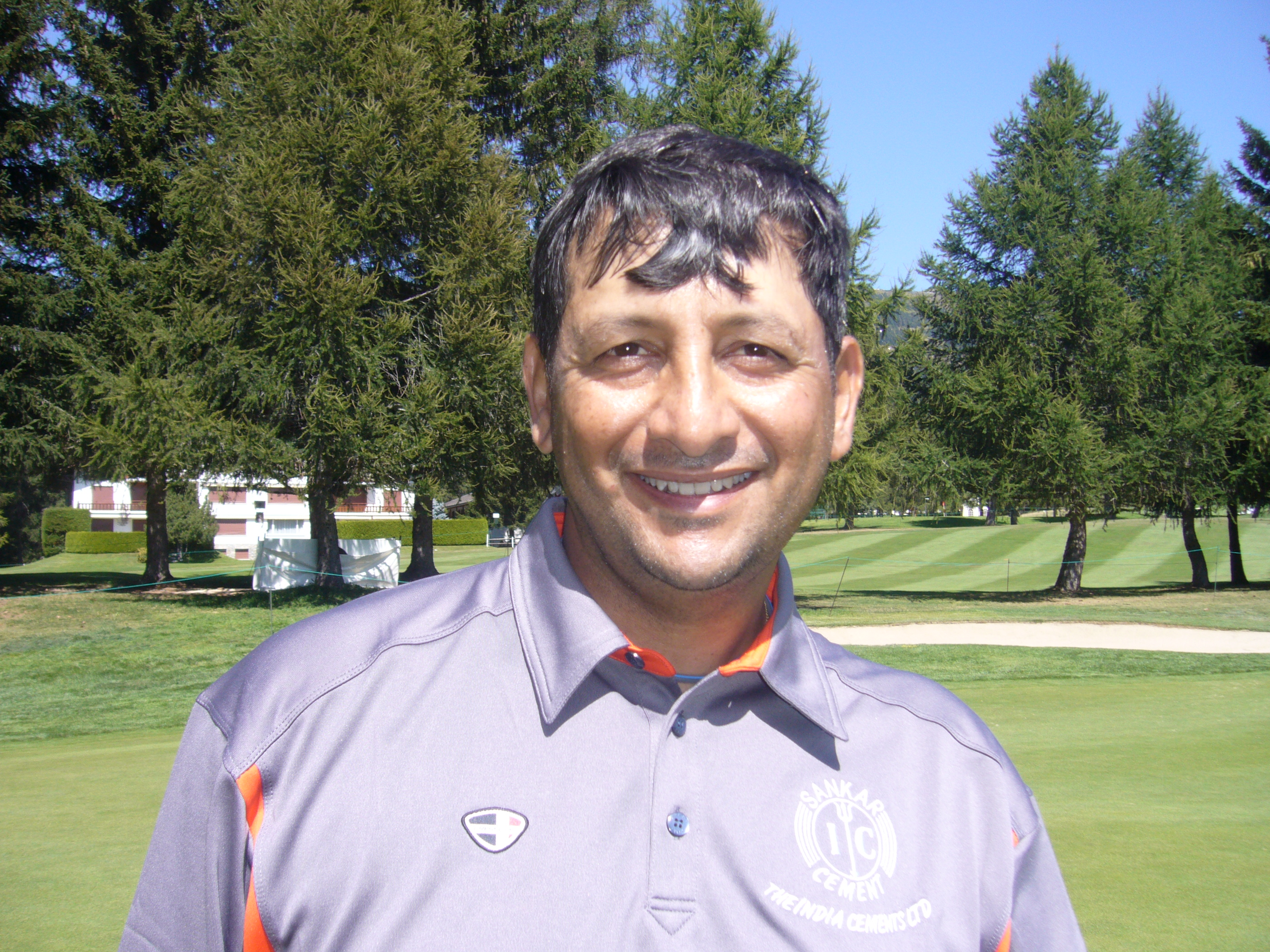
- Ghei in 2009

Personal information
- Nationality: India
- Born: 25 September 1968 (age 58)

Career
- Sport: Golf
- Turned professional: 1991
- Professional wins: 5

Number of wins by tour
- Asian Tour: 3
- Other: 2

Best results in major championships
- Masters Tournament: DNP
- PGA Championship: DNP
- U.S. Open: DNP
- The Open Championship: CUT: 1997

Gaurav Ghei (born 25 September 1968) is an Indian professional golfer who plays on the Asian Tour.

== Career ==
In 1991, Ghee turned professional. His has won three Asian Tour events: the 1995 Gadgil Western Masters, the 2006 Taiwan Masters, and the 2007 Beijing Open.

In 1997, he became the first Indian golfer to qualify for The Open Championship.

== Amateur wins ==
- 1991 East India Amateur, West India Amateur, North India Amateur

== Professional wins (5) ==
=== Asian Tour wins (3) ===
No.	Date	Tournament	Winning score	Margin of victory	Runner-up
1	27 Nov 1995	Gadgil Western Masters	−14 (69-69-67-69=274)	1 stroke	(India) Vijay Kumar
2	1 Oct 2006	Mercuries Taiwan Masters	−10 (71-72-69-66=278)	1 stroke	(India) Rahil Gangjee
3	29 Apr 2007	Pine Valley Beijing Open	−14 (65-72-68-69=274)	2 strokes	(Australia) Adam Blyth

=== Other wins (2) ===
- 1994 Desaru Classic (Malaysia)
- 1999 Asian Nations Cup (Malaysia; individual)

== Results in major championships ==
Tournament	1997
The Open Championship	CUT

Note: Ghei only played in The Open Championship.
CUT = missed the half-way cut

== Team appearances ==
- Dunhill Cup (representing India): 1996
- World Cup (representing India): 1997, 2003, 2007
