= Choi Ho-sung =

South Korean professional golfer (1973)

Personal information
- Nationality: South Korea
- Born: 23 September 1973 (age 53) Pohang, Gyeongsangbuk-do, South Korea
- Height: 1.72 m (5 ft 8 in)
- Weight: 76 kg (168 lb; 12.0 st)

Career
- Sport: Golf
- Turned professional: 2001
- Current tour: Japan PGA Senior Tour
- Former tours: Japan Golf Tour; Korean Tour; OneAsia Tour
- Professional wins: 7

Number of wins by tour
- Japan Golf Tour: 3
- Other: 4

Choi Ho-sung (Korean: 최호성; born 23 September 1973) is a South Korean professional golfer.

== Professional career ==
Choi has played on the Korean Tour and OneAsia Tour. He won the 2013 Enjoy Jakarta Indonesia PGA Championship, co-sanctioned by the OneAsia Tour and the Japan Golf Tour, making him eligible for Japan Golf Tour membership. Since 2013 he has played primarily on the Japan Golf Tour. On 24 November 2018, Choi won the Casio World Open on the Japan Tour.

Choi has an idiosyncratic follow-through. His action has been dubbed "The Fisherman Swing" and has won him many fans on social media and elsewhere.

== Professional wins (7) ==
=== Japan Golf Tour wins (3) ===
| No. | Date | Tournament | Winning score | Margin of victory | Runner(s)-up |
|---|---|---|---|---|---|
| 1 | 25 Mar 2013 | Enjoy Jakarta Indonesia PGA Championship^{1} | −19 (67-70-65-67=269) | 2 strokes | (Philippines) Juvic Pagunsan, (South Korea) Song Young-han, (Japan) Kaname Yokoo |
| 2 | 25 Nov 2018 | Casio World Open | −15 (67-70-69-67=273) | 1 stroke | (Australia) Brendan Jones |
| 3 | 10 Nov 2019 | Heiwa PGM Championship | −14 (68-67-68-67=270) | 2 strokes | (Japan) Shugo Imahira |

^{1}Co-sanctioned by the OneAsia Tour

=== OneAsia Tour wins (1) ===
| No. | Date | Tournament | Winning score | Margin of victory | Runners-up |
|---|---|---|---|---|---|
| 1 | 25 Mar 2013 | Enjoy Jakarta Indonesia PGA Championship^{1} | −19 (67-70-65-67=269) | 2 strokes | (Philippines) Juvic Pagunsan, (South Korea) Song Young-han, (Japan) Kaname Yokoo |

^{1}Co-sanctioned by the Japan Golf Tour

=== Korean Tour wins (2) ===
| No. | Date | Tournament | Winning score | Margin of victory | Runner-up |
|---|---|---|---|---|---|
| 1 | 9 Nov 2008 | SBS Hana Tour Championship | −6 (69-71-72-70=282) | Playoff | (South Korea) Kim Dae-hyun |
| 2 | 29 May 2011 | Lake Hills Open | −8 (71-68-69-72=280) | 4 strokes | (United States) John Huh |

Korean Tour playoff record (1–0)

| No. | Year | Tournament | Opponent | Result |
|---|---|---|---|---|
| 1 | 2008 | SBS Hana Tour Championship | (South Korea) Kim Dae-hyun | Won with birdie on second extra hole |

=== Japan PGA Senior Tour wins (2) ===
| No. | Date | Tournament | Winning score | Margin of victory | Runner-up |
|---|---|---|---|---|---|
| 1 | 15 Sep 2024 | Japan Senior Open Golf Championship | −9 (64-69-73-69=275) | 1 stroke | (South Korea) Jang Ik-jae |
| 2 | 16 Nov 2025 | ISPS Handa Senior Grand Gold Classic | −10 (68-72-66=206) | Playoff | (Thailand) Thammanoon Sriroj |
