= Azuma Yano =

Japanese golfer

Azuma Yano 矢野 東
Personal information
- Nationality: Japan
- Born: 6 July 1977 (age 49) Gunma Prefecture, Japan
- Height: 1.76 m (5 ft 9 in)
- Weight: 65 kg (143 lb; 10.2 st)

Career
- Sport: Golf
- Turned professional: 2000
- Current tour: Japan Golf Tour
- Professional wins: 5
- Highest ranking: 69 (30 November 2008)

Number of wins by tour
- Japan Golf Tour: 3
- Other: 2

Best results in major championships
- Masters Tournament: DNP
- PGA Championship: DNP
- U.S. Open: T27: 2009
- The Open Championship: CUT: 2008, 2009

Azuma Yano (矢野 東, Yano Azuma) (born 6 July 1977) is a Japanese professional golfer.

== Professional career ==
Yano has won three tournaments on the Japan Golf Tour and featured in the top 100 of the Official World Golf Rankings.

== Professional wins (5) ==
=== Japan Golf Tour wins (3) ===
| No. | Date | Tournament | Winning score | Margin of victory | Runner(s)-up |
|---|---|---|---|---|---|
| 1 | 6 Nov 2005 | Asahi-Ryokuken Yomiuri Memorial | −18 (69-67-67-67=270) | 1 stroke | (Fiji) Dinesh Chand, (Japan) Nozomi Kawahara, (Japan) Taichi Teshima |
| 2 | 21 Sep 2008 | ANA Open | −15 (68-68-69-68=273) | 4 strokes | (Japan) Toshinori Muto, (Japan) Tsuneyuki Nakajima |
| 3 | 26 Oct 2008 | Bridgestone Open | −21 (65-66-69-67=267) | 4 strokes | (Japan) Takao Nogami |

=== Japan Challenge Tour wins (2) ===
| No. | Date | Tournament | Winning score | Margin of victory | Runner(s)-up |
|---|---|---|---|---|---|
| 1 | 9 Mar 2001 | PRGR Cup (Cyubu) | −5 (67) | 1 stroke | (Japan) Kohei Ban, (Japan) Atsushi Takamatsu, (Japan) Hiroshi Ueda |
| 2 | 5 Oct 2001 | PRGR Cup (Kanto) | −8 (68-68=136) | 1 stroke | (Japan) Atsushi Takamatsu |

== Results in major championships ==
| Tournament | 2008 | 2009 | 2010 | 2011 | 2012 | 2013 | 2014 |
|---|---|---|---|---|---|---|---|
| Masters Tournament | | | | | | | |
| U.S. Open | | T27 | CUT | | | | CUT |
| The Open Championship | CUT | CUT | | | | | |
| PGA Championship | | | | | | | |

Did not play

CUT = missed the half-way cut
"T" = tied for place

== Results in World Golf Championships ==
| Tournament | 2009 |
|---|---|
| Match Play | |
| Championship | 76 |
| Invitational | |
| Champions | |

Did not play
