= 2016 Japan Golf Tour =

Golf tour season

2016 Japan Golf Tour season
- Duration: 28 January 2016 – 4 December 2016
- Number of official events: 26
- Most wins: (Japan) Yuta Ikeda (3) (South Korea) Kim Kyung-tae (3) (Japan) Hideto Tanihara (3)
- Money list: (Japan) Yuta Ikeda
- Most Valuable Player: (Japan) Yuta Ikeda
- Rookie of the Year: (South Africa) Shaun Norris

The 2016 Japan Golf Tour was the 44th season of the Japan Golf Tour (formerly the PGA of Japan Tour), the main professional golf tour in Japan since it was formed in 1973.

== Schedule ==
The following table lists official events during the 2016 season.

| Date | Tournament | Location | Purse (¥) | Winner (Note: The number in brackets after each winner's name is the number of Japan Golf Tour events they had won up to and including that tournament. This information is only shown for Japan Golf Tour members.) | OWGR points | Other tours (Note: ASA − Asian Tour.) | Notes |
|---|---|---|---|---|---|---|---|
| 1 Feb | SMBC Singapore Open | Singapore | US$1,000,000 | (South Korea) Song Young-han (1) | 28 | ASA | New to Japan Golf Tour |
| 7 Feb | Leopalace21 Myanmar Open | Myanmar | US$750,000 | (South Africa) Shaun Norris (1) | 15 | ASA | New to Japan Golf Tour |
| 17 Apr | Token Homemate Cup | Mie | 130,000,000 | (South Korea) Kim Kyung-tae (11) | 16 | | |
| 24 Apr | Panasonic Open Golf Championship | Chiba | 150,000,000 | (Japan) Yuta Ikeda (14) | 16 | ASA | |
| 1 May | The Crowns | Aichi | 120,000,000 | (South Korea) Kim Kyung-tae (12) | 16 | | |
| 22 May | Kansai Open Golf Championship | Wakayama | 70,000,000 | (South Korea) Cho Byung-min (1) | 16 | | |
| 29 May | Gateway to The Open Mizuno Open | Okayama | 100,000,000 | (South Korea) Kim Kyung-tae (13) | 16 | | |
| 5 Jun | Japan Golf Tour Championship; Mori Building Cup Shishido Hills | Ibaraki | 150,000,000 | (Japan) Yosuke Tsukada (1) | 16 | | Japan major |
| 26 Jun | ISPS Handa Global Cup | Ishikawa | 100,000,000 | (South Korea) Park Jun-won (1) | 20 | | |
| 3 Jul | Shigeo Nagashima Invitational Sega Sammy Cup | Hokkaidō | 150,000,000 | (Japan) Hideto Tanihara (12) | 16 | | |
| 10 Jul | Japan PGA Championship Nissin Cupnoodles Cup | Hokkaidō | 150,000,000 | (Japan) Hideto Tanihara (13) | 16 | | Japan major |
| 24 Jul | Dunlop Srixon Fukushima Open | Fukushima | 50,000,000 | (Japan) Ryuko Tokimatsu (1) | 16 | | |
| 28 Aug | RIZAP KBC Augusta | Fukuoka | 100,000,000 | (Japan) Ryo Ishikawa (14) | 16 | | |
| 4 Sep | Fujisankei Classic | Yamanashi | 110,000,000 | (South Korea) Cho Min-gyu (2) | 16 | | |
| 18 Sep | ANA Open | Hokkaidō | 110,000,000 | (Australia) Brendan Jones (14) | 16 | | |
| 25 Sep | Asia-Pacific Diamond Cup Golf | Osaka | 150,000,000 | (Taiwan) Chan Shih-chang (1) | 15 | ASA | |
| 2 Oct | Top Cup Tokai Classic | Aichi | 110,000,000 | (Japan) Daisuke Kataoka (2) | 16 | | |
| 9 Oct | Honma TourWorld Cup | Ibaraki | 100,000,000 | (Japan) Yuta Ikeda (15) | 16 | | |
| 16 Oct | Japan Open Golf Championship | Saitama | 200,000,000 | (Japan) Hideki Matsuyama (7) | 32 | | Flagship event (Note: Also a Japan major championship.) |
| 23 Oct | Bridgestone Open | Chiba | 150,000,000 | (Japan) Satoshi Kodaira (4) | 18 | | |
| 30 Oct | Mynavi ABC Championship | Hyōgo | 150,000,000 | (Japan) Shingo Katayama (30) | 16 | | |
| 6 Nov | Heiwa PGM Championship | Chiba | 200,000,000 | (Japan) Hideto Tanihara (14) | 16 | | |
| 13 Nov | Mitsui Sumitomo Visa Taiheiyo Masters | Shizuoka | 200,000,000 | (Japan) Hideki Matsuyama (8) | 23 | | |
| 20 Nov | Dunlop Phoenix Tournament | Miyazaki | 200,000,000 | (United States) Brooks Koepka (n/a) | 26 | | |
| 27 Nov | Casio World Open | Kōchi | 200,000,000 | (Japan) Yuta Ikeda (16) | 16 | | |
| 4 Dec | Golf Nippon Series JT Cup | Tokyo | 130,000,000 | (South Korea) Park Sang-hyun (1) | 18 | | Japan major |

=== Unofficial events ===
The following events were sanctioned by the Japan Golf Tour, but did not carry official money, nor were wins official.

| Date | Tournament | Location | Purse (¥) | Winner(s) | OWGR points | Other tours | Notes |
|---|---|---|---|---|---|---|---|
| 10 Apr | Masters Tournament | United States | US$10,000,000 | (England) Danny Willett | 100 | | Major championship |
| 8 May | Legend Charity Pro-Am | Chiba | 50,000,000 | (Japan) Shingo Katayama | n/a | | Pro-Am |
| 19 Jun | U.S. Open | United States | US$10,000,000 | (United States) Dustin Johnson | 100 | | Major championship |
| 17 Jul | The Open Championship | Scotland | £6,500,000 | (Sweden) Henrik Stenson | 100 | | Major championship |
| 31 Jul | PGA Championship | United States | US$10,000,000 | (United States) Jimmy Walker | 100 | | Major championship |
| 11 Dec | Hitachi 3Tours Championship | Chiba | 57,000,000 | Japan Golf Tour | n/a | | Team event |

== Money list ==
The money list was based on prize money won during the season, calculated in Japanese yen.

| Position | Player | Prize money (¥) |
|---|---|---|
| 1 | (Japan) Yuta Ikeda | 207,901,567 |
| 2 | (Japan) Hideto Tanihara | 171,902,867 |
| 3 | (South Korea) Kim Kyung-tae | 113,714,688 |
| 4 | (South Korea) Song Young-han | 91,562,130 |
| 5 | (Japan) Daisuke Kataoka | 86,019,113 |

== Awards ==
| Award | Winner | Ref. |
|---|---|---|
| Most Valuable Player | (Japan) Yuta Ikeda | |
| Rookie of the Year (Shimada Trophy) | (South Africa) Shaun Norris | |

== Japan Challenge Tour ==
2016 Japan Challenge Tour season
- Duration: 1 April 2016 – 21 October 2016
- Number of official events: 15
- Most wins: (Japan) Daisuke Maruyama (2) (Japan) Konosuke Nakazato (2) (Japan) Yoshinobu Tsukada (2)
- Money list: (Japan) Yoshinobu Tsukada

The 2016 Japan Challenge Tour was the 32nd season of the Japan Challenge Tour, the official development tour to the Japan Golf Tour.

=== Schedule ===
The following table lists official events during the 2016 season.

| Date | Tournament | Location | Purse (¥) | Winner (Note: The number in brackets after each winner's name is the number of Japan Challenge Tour events they had won up to and including that tournament. It is rare for someone to accumulate many wins on the Japan Challenge Tour as success at this level usually leads to promotion to the Japan Golf Tour.) |
|---|---|---|---|---|
| 3 Apr | Novil Cup | Tokushima | 15,000,000 | (Japan) Tatsuya Kodai (1) |
| 29 Apr | Fuji Home Service Challenge Cup | Shiga | 10,000,000 | (Japan) Yoshinobu Tsukada (1) |
| 20 May | Heiwa PGM Challenge I Road to Championship | Gifu | 10,000,000 | (Japan) Kazuhiro Kida (3) |
| 27 May | FIDRA Classic | Saitama | 10,000,000 | (Japan) Kunihiro Kamii (1) |
| 10 Jun | ISPS Handa Global Challenge Cup | Chiba | 13,000,000 | (Japan) Konosuke Nakazato (1) |
| 17 Jun | Himawari Dragon Cup | Chiba | 10,000,000 | (Japan) Yuta Kawakami (1) |
| 24 Jun | Landic Challenge | Fukuoka | 10,000,000 | (Japan) Shotaro Wada (1) |
| 1 Jul | Japan Create Challenge | Fukuoka | 10,000,000 | (Japan) Ryuko Tokimatsu (1) |
| 29 Jul | Minami Akita Country Club Michinoku Challenge Tournament | Akita | 10,000,000 | (Japan) Tomoyo Ikemura (3) |
| 9 Sep | Seven Dreamers Challenge | Chiba | 13,000,000 | (Japan) Daisuke Maruyama (2) |
| 23 Sep | Elite Grips Challenge | Gunma | 10,000,000 | (Japan) Jinichiro Kozuma (1) |
| 30 Sep | Heiwa PGM Challenge II Road to Championship | Hokkaido | 10,000,000 | (Japan) Konosuke Nakazato (2) |
| 8 Oct | Everyone Project Challenge | Tochigi | 10,000,000 | (Japan) Yoshinobu Tsukada (2) |
| 14 Oct | Taiheiyo Club Challenge Tournament | Saitama | 10,000,000 | (Japan) Daisuke Maruyama (3) |
| 21 Oct | JGTO Novil Final | Chiba | 10,000,000 | (Japan) Takashi Ogiso (1) |

=== Money list ===
The money list was based on prize money won during the season, calculated in Japanese yen. The top seven players on the money list earned status to play on the 2017 Japan Golf Tour.

| Position | Player | Prize money (¥) |
|---|---|---|
| 1 | (Japan) Yoshinobu Tsukada | 5,509,115 |
| 2 | (Japan) Daisuke Maruyama | 5,339,822 |
| 3 | (Japan) Konosuke Nakazato | 4,497,278 |
| 4 | (Japan) Tatsuya Kodai | 4,482,357 |
| 5 | (Japan) Shotaro Wada | 3,574,383 |
| 6 | (Japan) Takashi Ogiso | 3,206,641 |
| 7 | (Japan) Daijiro Izumida | 3,143,055 |
