= ISPS Handa Global Cup =

Coordinates: 35.4978°N 140.1157°E

ISPS Handa Match Play
Tournament information
- Location: Ichihara, Chiba, Japan
- Established: 2015
- Course: Hamano Golf Club
- Par: 72
- Length: 7,115 yards (6,506 m)
- Tour: Japan Golf Tour
- Format: Match play Stroke play
- Prize fund: ¥230,000,000
- Month played: September
- Final year: 2018

Tournament record score
- Aggregate: 267 Emiliano Grillo (2016); 267 Park Jun-won (2016)
- To par: −17 as above
- Score: 3 and 2 Shingo Katayama (2017)

Final champion
- (Thailand) Thanyakon Khrongpha
- Location in Japan Location in the Chiba Prefecture

The ISPS Handa Global Cup was professional golf tournament on the Japan Golf Tour. Its main sponsor was International Sports Promotion Society (ISPS). Founded in 2015 as a 72-hole stroke play tournament, in 2017 it became a match play event and was renamed the ISPS Handa Match Play.

== Winners ==
| Year | Winner | Score | To par | Margin of victory | Runner-up | Purse (¥) | Winner's share (¥) | Venue |
ISPS Handa Match Play
| 2018 | (Thailand) Thanyakon Khrongpha | 2 and 1 | | | (Japan) Shugo Imahira | 230,000,000 | 52,000,000 | Hamano |
| 2017 | (Japan) Shingo Katayama | 3 and 2 | | | (South Korea) Ryu Hyun-woo | 210,000,000 | 50,000,000 | Hamano |
ISPS Handa Global Cup
| 2016 | (South Korea) Park Jun-won | 267 | −17 | Playoff | (Argentina) Emiliano Grillo | 100,000,000 | 20,000,000 | Tokinodai |
| 2015 | (Japan) Toshinori Muto | 270 | −14 | Playoff | (Philippines) Angelo Que | 100,000,000 | 20,000,000 | Vintage |
