= Totoumi Hamamatsu Open =

Tournament information
- Location: Hamamatsu, Shizuoka, Japan
- Established: 2011
- Course: Grandee Hamanako Golf Club
- Par: 72
- Length: 7,054 yards (6,450 m)
- Tour: Japan Golf Tour
- Format: Stroke play
- Prize fund: ¥100,000,000
- Month played: May
- Final year: 2012

Tournament record score
- Aggregate: 268 Ryo Ishikawa (2011); 268 Masanori Kobayashi (2011)
- To par: −20 as above

Final champion
- (United States) Jay Choi
- Location in Japan Location in the Shizuoka Prefecture

The Totoumi Hamamatsu Open (とおとうみ浜松オープン, Tōtoumi hamamatsu ōpun) was a professional golf tournament on the Japan Golf Tour in 2011 and 2012. It was played at the Grandee Hamanako Golf Club in Hamamatsu, Shizuoka Prefecture. In 2012, the purse was ¥100,000,000 with ¥20,000,000 going to the winner.

== Winners ==
| Year | Winner | Score | To par | Margin of victory | Runner-up |
|---|---|---|---|---|---|
| 2012 | (United States) Jay Choi | 272 | −16 | 1 stroke | (Japan) Yoshinori Fujimoto |
| 2011 | (Japan) Masanori Kobayashi | 268 | −20 | Playoff (Note: Kobayashi won with a birdie on the second hole of a sudden-death playoff.) | (Japan) Ryo Ishikawa |
