= 2019 Japan Golf Tour =

Golf tour season

2019 Japan Golf Tour season
- Duration: 17 January 2019 – 8 December 2019
- Number of official events: 25
- Most wins: (Japan) Ryo Ishikawa (3)
- Money list: (Japan) Shugo Imahira
- Most Valuable Player: (Japan) Shugo Imahira
- Rookie of the Year: (Thailand) Jazz Janewattananond

The 2019 Japan Golf Tour was the 47th season of the Japan Golf Tour (formerly the PGA of Japan Tour), the main professional golf tour in Japan since it was formed in 1973.

== Changes for 2019 ==
The Shinhan Donghae Open was added to the schedule and was co-sanctioned by the Asian Tour and the Korean Tour. Additionally, a new tournament that was to be played in Japan as part of the 2019–20 PGA Tour season; the Zozo Championship was also added to the schedule as a co-sanctioned event between the Japan Golf Tour and the PGA Tour.

== Schedule ==
The following table lists official events during the 2019 season.

Date	Tournament	Location	Purse (¥)	Winner (Note: The number in brackets after each winner's name is the number of Japan Golf Tour events they had won up to and including that tournament. This information is only shown for Japan Golf Tour members.)	OWGR points	Other tours (Note: ASA − Asian Tour; KOR − Korean Tour; PGAT − PGA Tour.)	Notes
20 Jan	SMBC Singapore Open	Singapore	US$1,000,000	(Thailand) Jazz Janewattananond (1)	24	ASA	
21 Apr	Token Homemate Cup	Mie	130,000,000	(Australia) Brendan Jones (15)	16		
5 May	The Crowns	Aichi	120,000,000	(Japan) Katsumasa Miyamoto (12)	16		
12 May	Asia-Pacific Diamond Cup Golf	Chiba	150,000,000	(Japan) Yosuke Asaji (1)	15	ASA	
26 May	Kansai Open Golf Championship	Nara	70,000,000	(Japan) Tomoharu Otsuki (1)	16		
2 Jun	Gateway to The Open Mizuno Open	Ibaraki	100,000,000	(Japan) Yuta Ikeda (21)	16		
9 Jun	Japan Golf Tour Championship; Mori Building Cup Shishido Hills	Ibaraki	150,000,000	(Japan) Mikumu Horikawa (1)	16		Japan major
30 Jun	Dunlop Srixon Fukushima Open	Fukushima	50,000,000	(Japan) Rikuya Hoshino (2)	16		
7 Jul	Japan PGA Championship	Kagoshima	150,000,000	(Japan) Ryo Ishikawa (15)	16		Japan major
25 Aug	Shigeo Nagashima Invitational Sega Sammy Cup	Hokkaido	150,000,000	(Japan) Ryo Ishikawa (16)	16		
1 Sep	RIZAP KBC Augusta	Fukuoka	100,000,000	(Japan) Kazuki Higa (1)	16		
8 Sep	Fujisankei Classic	Yamanashi	110,000,000	(South Korea) Park Sang-hyun (2)	16		
15 Sep	ANA Open	Hokkaido	110,000,000	(Japan) Yosuke Asaji (2)	16		
22 Sep	Shinhan Donghae Open	South Korea	₩1,200,000,000	(South Africa) Jbe' Kruger (1)	14	ASA, KOR	New to Japan Golf Tour
29 Sep	Panasonic Open Golf Championship	Hyōgo	150,000,000	(Japan) Toshinori Muto (7)	15	ASA	
6 Oct	Tokai Classic	Aichi	110,000,000	(South Africa) Shaun Norris (4)	16		
13 Oct	Bridgestone Open	Chiba	150,000,000	(Japan) Shugo Imahira (3)	16		
20 Oct	Japan Open Golf Championship	Fukuoka	210,000,000	(United States) Chan Kim (4)	32		Flagship event (Note: Also a Japan major championship.)
28 Oct	Zozo Championship	Chiba	US$9,750,000	(United States) Tiger Woods (n/a)	64	PGAT	New limited-field event
3 Nov	Mynavi ABC Championship	Hyōgo	150,000,000	(South Korea) Hwang Jung-gon (4)	16		
10 Nov	Heiwa PGM Championship	Okinawa	200,000,000	(South Korea) Choi Ho-sung (3)	16		
17 Nov	Mitsui Sumitomo Visa Taiheiyo Masters	Shizuoka	200,000,000	(Japan) Takumi Kanaya (a) (1)	16		
24 Nov	Dunlop Phoenix Tournament	Miyazaki	200,000,000	(Japan) Shugo Imahira (4)	26		
1 Dec	Casio World Open	Kōchi	200,000,000	(South Korea) Kim Kyung-tae (14)	19		
8 Dec	Golf Nippon Series JT Cup	Tokyo	130,000,000	(Japan) Ryo Ishikawa (17)	19		Japan major

=== Unofficial events ===
The following events were sanctioned by the Japan Golf Tour, but did not carry official money, nor were wins official.

Date	Tournament	Location	Purse (¥)	Winner(s)	OWGR points	Other tours	Notes
14 Apr	Masters Tournament	United States	US$11,500,000	(United States) Tiger Woods	100		Major championship
19 May	PGA Championship	United States	US$11,000,000	(United States) Brooks Koepka	100		Major championship
16 Jun	U.S. Open	United States	US$12,500,000	(United States) Gary Woodland	100		Major championship
21 Jul	The Open Championship	Northern Ireland	US$10,750,000	(Republic of Ireland) Shane Lowry	100		Major championship
15 Dec	Hitachi 3Tours Championship	Chiba	57,000,000	LPGA of Japan Tour	n/a		Team event

== Money list ==
The money list was based on prize money won during the season, calculated in Japanese yen.

Position	Player	Prize money (¥)
1	(Japan) Shugo Imahira	168,049,312
2	(South Africa) Shaun Norris	145,044,149
3	(Japan) Ryo Ishikawa	132,812,990
4	(United States) Chan Kim	95,880,318
5	(South Korea) Hwang Jung-gon	94,985,827

== Awards ==
Award	Winner	Ref.
Most Valuable Player	(Japan) Shugo Imahira	
Rookie of the Year (Shimada Trophy)	(Thailand) Jazz Janewattananond	

== Japan Challenge Tour ==
2019 Japan Challenge Tour season
- Duration: 5 April 2019 – 25 October 2019
- Number of official events: 15
- Most wins: (South Korea) Todd Baek (2) (Japan) Yoshikazu Haku (2) (South Korea) Ham Jeong-woo (2) (South Korea) Park Jun-won (2)
- Money list: (Japan) Yoshikazu Haku

The 2019 Japan Challenge Tour, titled as the 2019 AbemaTV Tour for sponsorship reasons, was the 35th season of the Japan Challenge Tour, the official development tour to the Japan Golf Tour.

=== OWGR inclusion ===
In July 2018, it was announced that all Japan Challenge Tour events, beginning in 2019, would receive Official World Golf Ranking points at the minimum level of 4 points for the winner of a 54-hole event.

=== Schedule ===
The following table lists official events during the 2019 season.

Date	Tournament	Location	Purse (¥)	Winner (Note: The number in brackets after each winner's name is the number of Japan Challenge Tour events they had won up to and including that tournament. It is rare for someone to accumulate many wins on the Japan Challenge Tour as success at this level usually leads to promotion to the Japan Golf Tour.)	OWGR points
7 Apr	Novil Cup	Tokushima	15,000,000	(South Korea) Park Jun-won (1)	4
19 Apr	i Golf Shaper Challenge	Fukuoka	15,000,000	(Thailand) Danthai Boonma (1)	7
26 Apr	Japan Create Challenge	Fukuoka	15,000,000	(Philippines) Justin De Los Santos (1)	7
17 May	Heiwa PGM Challenge I Road To Championship	Ibaraki	15,000,000	(South Korea) Kim Seong-hyeon (1)	7
31 May	Taiheiyo Club Challenge Tournament	Saitama	15,000,000	(Japan) Yoshikazu Haku (1)	4
14 Jun	Landic Challenge 7	Fukuoka	15,000,000	(Zimbabwe) Scott Vincent (1)	7
21 Jun	Minami Akita CC Michinoku Challenge	Akita	15,000,000	(South Korea) Park Jun-won (2)	4
29 Jun	Daisendori Cup	Tottori	16,000,000	(Japan) Eric Sugimoto (1)	4
3 Aug	TI Challenge	Hyōgo	15,000,000	(South Korea) Ham Jeong-woo (1)	4
13 Sep	Delight Works ASP Challenge	Tochigi	15,000,000	(South Korea) Ham Jeong-woo (2)	4
20 Sep	Heiwa PGM Challenge II Road To Championship	Saga	15,000,000	(South Korea) Todd Baek (1)	4
27 Sep	Elite Grips Challenge	Hyōgo	15,000,000	(Greece) Peter Karmis (1)	4
4 Oct	Toshin Challenge	Shiga	15,000,000	(South Korea) Todd Baek (2)	4
11 Oct	Ryo Ishikawa Everyone Project Challenge	Tochigi	15,000,000	(Japan) Taiga Sugihara (a) (1)	4
25 Oct	JGTO Novil Final	Ibaraki	15,000,000	(Japan) Yoshikazu Haku (2)	4

=== Money list ===
The money list was based on prize money won during the season, calculated in Japanese yen. The top 20 players on the money list earned status to play on the 2020–21 Japan Golf Tour.

Position	Player	Prize money (¥)
1	(Japan) Yoshikazu Haku	6,797,444
2	(South Korea) Todd Baek	6,560,781
3	(Japan) Eric Sugimoto	6,462,858
4	(South Korea) Park Jun-won	6,280,270
5	(South Korea) Ham Jeong-woo	5,400,000
