= 2011 Korean Tour =

Golf tour season

2011 Korean Tour season
- Duration: 31 March 2011 – 30 October 2011
- Number of official events: 16 (Note: A further one tournament was scheduled but was abandoned.)
- Most wins: (South Korea) Hong Soon-sang (2) (South Korea) Kang Kyung-nam (2)
- Order of Merit: (South Korea) Hong Soon-sang
- Player of the Year: (South Korea) Hong Soon-sang
- Rookie of the Year: (United States) John Huh

The 2011 Korean Tour was the 34th season on the Korean Tour, the main professional golf tour in South Korea since it was formed in 1978.

== OWGR inclusion ==
In August 2010, it was announced that all Korean Tour events, beginning in 2011, would receive Official World Golf Ranking points at the minimum level of 6 points for the winner of a 72-hole event.

== Schedule ==
The following table lists official events during the 2011 season.

Date	Tournament	Location	Purse (₩)	Winner (Note: The number in brackets after each winner's name is the number of Korean Tour events they had won up to and including that tournament. This information is only shown for Korean Tour members.)	OWGR points	Other tours (Note: ASA − Asian Tour; EUR − European Tour; ONE − OneAsia Tour.)	Notes
3 Apr	Twayair Open	Jeju	300,000,000	(Australia) Andrew Tschudin (2)	6		
1 May	Ballantine's Championship	Gyeonggi	€2,205,000	(England) Lee Westwood (n/a)	42	ASA, EUR	
8 May	GS Caltex Maekyung Open	Gyeonggi	1,000,000,000	(South Korea) Kim Kyung-tae (6)	10	ONE	
15 May	Volvik Gunsan CC Open	North Jeolla	300,000,000	(South Korea) Lee Seong-ho (6)	6		New tournament
22 May	SK Telecom Open	Jeju	900,000,000	(Australia) Kurt Barnes (n/a)	14	ONE	
29 May	Lake Hills Open	South Gyeongsang	300,000,000	(South Korea) Choi Ho-sung (2)	6		
5 Jun	Subaru Classic	Gyeonggi	500,000,000	(South Korea) Hong Soon-sang (3)	6		
26 Jun	Dongbu Insurance Promy Open	Gangwon	300,000,000	(South Korea) Kang Kyung-nam (8)	6		
~~10 Jul~~	Charity High 1 Resort Open	Gangwon	–	Abandoned (Note: Tournament abandoned due to persistent bad weather.)	–	ONE	New tournament
7 Aug	Johnnie Walker Open	Jeju	300,000,000	(South Korea) Park Do-kyu (5)	6		
28 Aug	Daishin Securities KPGA Championship	Gyeonggi	500,000,000	(South Korea) Kim Byung-jun (1)	6		
25 Sep	Munsingwear Championship	Gyeonggi	400,000,000	(South Korea) Hong Soon-sang (4)	6		
2 Oct	Shinhan Donghae Open	Gyeonggi	1,000,000,000	(England) Paul Casey (n/a)	20		
9 Oct	Kolon Korea Open	South Chungcheong	1,000,000,000	(United States) Rickie Fowler (n/a)	26	ONE	
16 Oct	Meritz Solmoro Open	Gyeonggi	500,000,000	(South Korea) Kang Kyung-nam (9)	6		
23 Oct	CJ Invitational	Gyeonggi	US$750,000	(South Korea) K. J. Choi (15)	22	ASA	New tournament
30 Oct	NH Open	Gyeonggi	500,000,000	(South Korea) Lee Sang-hee (1)	6		New tournament

== Order of Merit ==
The Order of Merit was titled as the Ballantine's Points and was based on tournament results during the season, calculated using a points-based system.

Position	Player	Points
1	(South Korea) Hong Soon-sang	3,160
2	(South Korea) Kang Kyung-nam	3,125
3	(South Korea) Choi Ho-sung	3,095
4	(South Korea) Kim Kyung-tae	2,100
5	(South Korea) Ryu Hyun-woo	2,070

== Awards ==
Award	Winner	Ref.
Player of the Year (Grand Prize Award)	(South Korea) Hong Soon-sang	
Rookie of the Year (Myeong-chul Award)	(United States) John Huh	
