= Park Jun-won =

South Korean golfer

Personal information
- Nationality: South Korea
- Born: 30 June 1986 (age 40)
- Height: 1.71 m (5 ft 7 in)
- Weight: 65 kg (143 lb; 10.2 st)

Career
- Sport: Golf
- Turned professional: 2006
- Current tours: Japan Golf Tour; Korean Tour
- Former tour: Asian Tour
- Professional wins: 4

Number of wins by tour
- Japan Golf Tour: 1
- Other: 3

Park Jun-won (Korean: 박준원; born 30 June 1986) is a South Korean professional golfer.

Park turned professional in 2006. He played on the Asian Tour from 2006 to 2010. His best finish was second place at the 2006 Philippine Open. He has played on the Korean Tour since 2007, winning once at the 2014 GS Caltex Maekyung Open. He played on the Japan Golf Tour in 2008 and again in 2016, winning the 2016 ISPS Handa Global Cup.

== Professional wins (4) ==
=== Japan Golf Tour wins (1) ===
No.	Date	Tournament	Winning score	Margin of victory	Runner-up
1	26 Jun 2016	ISPS Handa Global Cup	−17 (66-67-68-66=267)	Playoff	(Argentina) Emiliano Grillo

Japan Golf Tour playoff record (1–0)

No.	Year	Tournament	Opponent	Result
1	2016	ISPS Handa Global Cup	(Argentina) Emiliano Grillo	Won with birdie on first extra hole

=== OneAsia Tour wins (1) ===
No.	Date	Tournament	Winning score	Margin of victory	Runner-up
1	11 May 2014	GS Caltex Maekyung Open^{1}	−15 (72-64-70-67=273)	3 strokes	(South Korea) Park Sang-hyun

^{1}Co-sanctioned by the Korean Tour

=== Korean Tour wins (1) ===
No.	Date	Tournament	Winning score	Margin of victory	Runner-up
1	11 May 2014	GS Caltex Maekyung Open^{1}	−15 (72-64-70-67=273)	3 strokes	(South Korea) Park Sang-hyun

^{1}Co-sanctioned by the OneAsia Tour

=== Japan Challenge Tour wins (2) ===
No.	Date	Tournament	Winning score	Margin of victory	Runner(s)-up
1	7 Apr 2019	Novil Cup	−10 (70-68-68=206)	2 strokes	(Japan) Eric Sugimoto
2	21 Jun 2019	Minami Akita CC Michinoku Challenge	−14 (68-67-64=199)	2 strokes	(Japan) Mikiya Akutsu, (South Korea) Cho Byung-min, (Japan) Naoto Nakanishi
