= Pine Valley Beijing Open =

Tournament information
- Location: Beijing, China
- Established: 2007
- Courses: Pine Valley Golf and Country Club
- Par: 7,299 yards (6,674 m)
- Length: 72
- Tours: Japan Golf Tour; Asian Tour; OneAsia Tour
- Format: Stroke play
- Prize fund: US$1,000,000
- Month played: May
- Final year: 2008

Tournament record score
- Aggregate: 274 Gaurav Ghei (2007)
- To par: −14 as above

Final champion
- (Japan) Hiroyuki Fujita
- Location in China

The Pine Valley Beijing Open was a men's professional golf tournament, played in 2007 and 2008. It was held at Pine Valley Golf Club in Beijing, China.

Originally an event on the Asian Tour, and co-sanctioned by the Japan Golf Tour in 2008, it became a founding tournament of the OneAsia Tour in 2009. However it was called off just a few weeks before it was due to be held, with organisers officially citing the state of the course and a clash of dates with The Players Championship on the PGA Tour. Some media commentators dismissed these reasons as the tournament had clashed with the Players Championship the previous year, and attributed the cancellation to sponsor discontent with the sanctioning changes.

== Winners ==
| Year | Tour(s) (Note: ASA − Asian Tour; JPN − Japan Golf Tour; ONE − OneAsia Tour.) | Winner | Score | To par | Margin of victory | Runner-up |
|---|---|---|---|---|---|---|
| 2009 | ONE | Cancelled | | | | |
| 2008 | ASA, JPN | (Japan) Hiroyuki Fujita | 276 | −12 | 3 strokes | (Japan) Shintaro Kai |
| 2007 | ASA | (India) Gaurav Ghei | 274 | −14 | 2 strokes | (Australia) Adam Blyth |
