= 2013 Japan Golf Tour =

Golf tour season

2013 Japan Golf Tour season
- Duration: 14 March 2013 – 8 December 2013
- Number of official events: 25
- Most wins: (Japan) Hideki Matsuyama (4)
- Money list: (Japan) Hideki Matsuyama
- Most Valuable Player: (Japan) Hideki Matsuyama
- Rookie of the Year: (Japan) Hideki Matsuyama

The 2013 Japan Golf Tour was the 41st season of the Japan Golf Tour (formerly the PGA of Japan Tour), the main professional golf tour in Japan since it was formed in 1973.

== Changes for 2013 ==
The first two tournaments of the year were new to the Japan Golf Tour and were played in Thailand and Indonesia; both being co-sanctioned by the OneAsia Tour.

== Schedule ==
The following table lists official events during the 2013 season.

| Date | Tournament | Location | Purse (¥) | Winner (Note: The number in brackets after each winner's name is the number of Japan Golf Tour events they had won up to and including that tournament. This information is only shown for Japan Golf Tour members.) | OWGR points | Other tours (Note: ASA − Asian Tour; ONE − OneAsia Tour.) | Notes |
|---|---|---|---|---|---|---|---|
| 17 Mar | Thailand Open | Thailand | US$1,000,000 | (Thailand) Prayad Marksaeng (4) | 18 | ONE | New to Japan Golf Tour |
| 31 Mar | Enjoy Jakarta Indonesia PGA Championship | Indonesia | US$1,000,000 | (South Korea) Choi Ho-sung (1) | 12 | ONE | New to Japan Golf Tour |
| 21 Apr | Token Homemate Cup | Mie | 130,000,000 | (Japan) Yoshinobu Tsukada (1) | 16 | | |
| 28 Apr | Tsuruya Open | Hyōgo | 120,000,000 | (Japan) Hideki Matsuyama (2) | 16 | | |
| 5 May | The Crowns | Aichi | 120,000,000 | (Japan) Michio Matsumura (3) | 16 | | |
| 19 May | Japan PGA Championship Nissin Cupnoodles Cup | Chiba | 150,000,000 | (South Korea) Kim Hyung-sung (2) | 16 | | Japan major |
| 2 Jun | Diamond Cup Golf | Ibaraki | 120,000,000 | (Japan) Hideki Matsuyama (3) | 16 | | |
| 23 Jun | Japan Golf Tour Championship Shishido Hills | Ibaraki | 150,000,000 | (Japan) Satoshi Kodaira (1) | 18 | | Japan major |
| 30 Jun | Gateway to The Open Mizuno Open | Okayama | 110,000,000 | (Australia) Brendan Jones (13) | 16 | | |
| 7 Jul | Nagashima Shigeo Invitational Sega Sammy Cup | Hokkaidō | 150,000,000 | (Japan) Shunsuke Sonoda (2) | 16 | | |
| 25 Aug | Kansai Open Golf Championship | Hyōgo | 60,000,000 | (Australia) Brad Kennedy (2) | 16 | | |
| 1 Sep | Vana H Cup KBC Augusta | Fukuoka | 110,000,000 | (South Korea) Park Sung-joon (1) | 16 | | |
| 8 Sep | Fujisankei Classic | Yamanashi | 110,000,000 | (Japan) Hideki Matsuyama (4) | 16 | | |
| 22 Sep | ANA Open | Hokkaidō | 110,000,000 | (Japan) Koumei Oda (6) | 16 | | |
| 29 Sep | Asia-Pacific Panasonic Open | Osaka | 150,000,000 | (Japan) Masahiro Kawamura (1) | 16 | ASA | |
| 6 Oct | Coca-Cola Tokai Classic | Aichi | 120,000,000 | (Japan) Shingo Katayama (27) | 16 | | |
| 13 Oct | Toshin Golf Tournament | Gifu | 90,000,000 | (Japan) Yoshinori Fujimoto (2) | 16 | | |
| 20 Oct | Japan Open Golf Championship | Ibaraki | 200,000,000 | (Japan) Masanori Kobayashi (3) | 32 | | Flagship event (Note: Also a Japan major championship.) |
| 27 Oct | Bridgestone Open | Chiba | 150,000,000 | (Japan) Daisuke Maruyama (3) | 16 | | |
| 3 Nov | Mynavi ABC Championship | Hyōgo | 150,000,000 | (Japan) Yuta Ikeda (11) | 16 | | |
| 10 Nov | Heiwa PGM Championship | Ibaraki | 200,000,000 | (China) Wu Ashun (2) | 16 | | New tournament |
| 17 Nov | Mitsui Sumitomo Visa Taiheiyo Masters | Shizuoka | 150,000,000 | (Japan) Hideto Tanihara (10) | 16 | | |
| 24 Nov | Dunlop Phoenix Tournament | Miyazaki | 200,000,000 | (England) Luke Donald (n/a) | 26 | | |
| 1 Dec | Casio World Open | Kōchi | 200,000,000 | (Japan) Hideki Matsuyama (5) | 18 | | |
| 8 Dec | Golf Nippon Series JT Cup | Tokyo | 130,000,000 | (Japan) Yūsaku Miyazato (1) | 18 | | Japan major |

=== Unofficial events ===
The following events were sanctioned by the Japan Golf Tour, but did not carry official money, nor were wins official.

| Date | Tournament | Location | Purse (¥) | Winner(s) | OWGR points | Other tours | Notes |
|---|---|---|---|---|---|---|---|
| 14 Apr | Masters Tournament | United States | US$8,000,000 | (Australia) Adam Scott | 100 | | Major championship |
| 12 May | Legend Charity Pro-Am | Chiba | 50,000,000 | (Japan) Yuta Ikeda | n/a | | Pro-Am |
| 16 Jun | U.S. Open | United States | US$8,000,000 | (England) Justin Rose | 100 | | Major championship |
| 21 Jul | The Open Championship | Scotland | £5,250,000 | (United States) Phil Mickelson | 100 | | Major championship |
| 11 Aug | PGA Championship | United States | US$8,000,000 | (United States) Jason Dufner | 100 | | Major championship |
| 15 Dec | Hitachi 3Tours Championship | Chiba | 57,000,000 | Japan Golf Tour | n/a | | Team event |

== Money list ==
The money list was based on prize money won during the season, calculated in Japanese yen.

| Position | Player | Prize money (¥) |
|---|---|---|
| 1 | (Japan) Hideki Matsuyama | 201,076,781 |
| 2 | (South Korea) Kim Hyung-sung | 125,824,405 |
| 3 | (Japan) Shingo Katayama | 112,557,810 |
| 4 | (Japan) Koumei Oda | 112,506,906 |
| 5 | (South Korea) Park Sung-joon | 93,402,445 |

== Awards ==
| Award | Winner | Ref. |
|---|---|---|
| Most Valuable Player | (Japan) Hideki Matsuyama | |
| Rookie of the Year (Shimada Trophy) | (Japan) Hideki Matsuyama | |

== Japan Challenge Tour ==
2013 Japan Challenge Tour season
- Duration: 5 April 2013 – 25 October 2013
- Number of official events: 15
- Most wins: (South Korea) Kwon Ki-taek (2)
- Money list: (South Korea) Kwon Ki-taek

The 2013 Japan Challenge Tour was the 29th season of the Japan Challenge Tour, the official development tour to the Japan Golf Tour.

=== Schedule ===
The following table lists official events during the 2013 season.

| Date | Tournament | Location | Purse (¥) | Winner (Note: The number in brackets after each winner's name is the number of Japan Challenge Tour events they had won up to and including that tournament. It is rare for someone to accumulate many wins on the Japan Challenge Tour as success at this level usually leads to promotion to the Japan Golf Tour.) |
|---|---|---|---|---|
| 7 Apr | Novil Cup | Tokushima | 15,000,000 | (South Korea) Jang Dong-kyu (1) |
| 19 Apr | Heiwa PGM Challenge I Road to Championship | Kyoto | 10,000,000 | (Australia) Paul Sheehan (2) |
| 24 May | Fuji Country Kani Club Challenge Cup | Gifu | 10,000,000 | (Japan) Ryuichi Kondo (1) |
| 7 Jun | ISPS Charity Challenge Tournament | Chiba | 15,000,000 | (Japan) Hiroyuki Nagamatsu (1) |
| 14 Jun | Akita TV Minami Akita CC JGTO Challenge I | Akita | 10,000,000 | (Japan) Sachio Sugiyama (1) |
| 5 Jul | Landic VanaH Cup KBC Augusta Challenge | Fukuoka | 10,000,000 | (South Korea) Kwon Ki-taek (1) |
| 26 Jul | Heiwa PGM Challenge II Road to Championship | Saga | 10,000,000 | (Japan) Genki Yanase (1) |
| 2 Aug | Daisen GC JGTO Challenge II | Tottori | 10,000,000 | (Japan) Masayuki Kawamura (1) |
| 16 Aug | ROYZE Corporation Cup in FukuokaRaizan | Fukuoka | 10,000,000 | (South Korea) Kwon Ki-taek (2) |
| 6 Sep | PGA JGTO Challenge Cup in Boso | Chiba | 10,000,000 | (Japan) Masamichi Ito (1) |
| 13 Sep | Dragon Cup | Chiba | 10,000,000 | (Japan) Toru Suzuki (1) |
| 22 Sep | Everyone Project Challenge Golf Tournament | Tochigi | 15,000,000 | (Japan) Shinji Tomimura (1) |
| 28 Sep | Elite Grips JGTO Challenge III | Mie | 10,000,000 | (Japan) Hirotaro Naito (2) |
| 11 Oct | Heiwa PGM Challenge III Road to Championship | Ibaraki | 10,000,000 | (Japan) Katsunori Kuwabara (2) |
| 25 Oct | JGTO Novil Final | Chiba | 10,000,000 | (Japan) Yoshitaka Takeya (1) |

=== Money list ===
The money list was based on prize money won during the season, calculated in Japanese yen. The top nine players on the money list earned status to play on the 2014 Japan Golf Tour.

| Position | Player | Prize money (¥) |
|---|---|---|
| 1 | (South Korea) Kwon Ki-taek | 5,326,885 |
| 2 | (Japan) Yoshitaka Takeya | 4,624,751 |
| 3 | (Australia) Richard Tate | 4,317,268 |
| 4 | (Japan) Shinji Tomimura | 3,906,859 |
| 5 | (South Korea) Jang Dong-kyu | 3,826,416 |
| 6 | (Japan) Masayuki Kawamura | 3,577,208 |
| 7 | (Japan) Toru Suzuki | 3,521,648 |
| 8 | (Japan) Ryuji Masaoka | 3,190,528 |
| 9 | (Japan) Ryuichi Kondo | 3,097,840 |
