= Shunsuke Sonoda =

Japanese golfer

Shunsuke Sonoda 薗田 峻輔
Personal information
- Nationality: Japan
- Born: 26 September 1989 (age 37) Tokyo, Japan
- Height: 1.77 m (5 ft 10 in)
- Weight: 86 kg (190 lb; 13.5 st)

Career
- Sport: Golf
- College: Meiji University
- Turned professional: 2010
- Current tour: Japan Golf Tour
- Professional wins: 3
- Highest ranking: 89 (2 January 2011)

Number of wins by tour
- Japan Golf Tour: 2
- Other: 1

Best results in major championships
- Masters Tournament: DNP
- PGA Championship: DNP
- U.S. Open: CUT: 2015
- The Open Championship: CUT: 2010

Achievements and awards
- Japan Golf Tour Rookie of the Year: 2010

Shunsuke Sonoda (薗田 峻輔, Sonoda Shunsuke; born 26 September 1989) is a Japanese professional golfer.

== Early life and amateur career ==
Sonoda was born in Tokyo. He was first trained by his father. After that he has been taught by golf teaching pro, Todd Baker, since he was 10 years old. When Sonoda visited Gold Coast, Australia with his family at age 13, he decided to study in Gold Coast because the town has many golf courses. He spent two years in a junior high school there to pursue his golf game further. He won the Japan National Junior Golf Championship. He decided to return Japan to enter the Suginami-Gakuin High School. He was a high school teammate of Ryo Ishikawa. Ishikawa calls him "King" as he swept all the junior tournaments. They first met in elementary school. In his sophomore year at the Meiji University, he qualified for Japan Golf Tour.

== Professional career ==
Sonoda began playing on the Japan Golf Tour in 2010 and won the 2010 Gateway to The Open Mizuno Open Yomiuri Classic. This victory earned him an exemption into the 2010 Open Championship.

== Professional wins (3) ==
=== Japan Golf Tour wins (2) ===
| No. | Date | Tournament | Winning score | Margin of victory | Runner(s)-up |
|---|---|---|---|---|---|
| 1 | 27 Jun 2010 | Gateway to The Open Mizuno Open Yomiuri Classic | −15 (70-65-66=201) (Note: Shortened to 54 holes due to weather.) | 3 strokes | (Japan) Toru Taniguchi |
| 2 | 7 Jul 2013 | Nagashima Shigeo Invitational Sega Sammy Cup | −20 (69-71-61-67=268) | 3 strokes | (Japan) Tomohiro Kondo, (Japan) Yuki Kono |

Japan Golf Tour playoff record (0–2)

| No. | Year | Tournament | Opponent(s) | Result |
|---|---|---|---|---|
| 1 | 2010 | Nagashima Shigeo Invitational Sega Sammy Cup | (South Korea) Cho Min-gyu, (Japan) Mamo Osanai | Osanai won with par on fourth extra hole Sonoda eliminated by par on second hole |
| 2 | 2010 | Fujisankei Classic | (Japan) Ryo Ishikawa | Lost to par on fourth extra hole |

=== Other wins (1) ===
- 2008 Sponichi Cup (as an amateur)

== Results in major championships ==
| Tournament | 2010 | 2011 | 2012 | 2013 | 2014 | 2015 |
|---|---|---|---|---|---|---|
| Masters Tournament | | | | | | |
| U.S. Open | | | | | | CUT |
| The Open Championship | CUT | | | | | |
| PGA Championship | | | | | | |

Did not play

CUT = missed the half-way cut
"T" = tied

== Results in World Golf Championships ==
| Tournament | 2010 |
|---|---|
| Match Play | |
| Championship | |
| Invitational | |
| Champions | T58 |

Did not play

"T" = Tied

== Team appearances ==
Amateur

- Eisenhower Trophy (representing Japan): 2008

Professional

- Royal Trophy (representing Asia): 2011
