= 2017 Japan Golf Tour =

Golf tour season

2017 Japan Golf Tour season
- Duration: 19 January 2017 – 3 December 2017
- Number of official events: 26
- Most wins: (Japan) Yūsaku Miyazato (4)
- Money list: (Japan) Yūsaku Miyazato
- Most Valuable Player: (Japan) Yūsaku Miyazato
- Rookie of the Year: (United States) Chan Kim

The 2017 Japan Golf Tour was the 45th season of the Japan Golf Tour (formerly the PGA of Japan Tour), the main professional golf tour in Japan since it was formed in 1973.

== Schedule ==
The following table lists official events during the 2017 season.

Date	Tournament	Location	Purse (¥)	Winner (Note: The number in brackets after each winner's name is the number of Japan Golf Tour events they had won up to and including that tournament. This information is only shown for Japan Golf Tour members.)	OWGR points	Other tours (Note: ASA − Asian Tour.)	Notes
22 Jan	SMBC Singapore Open	Singapore	US$1,000,000	(Thailand) Prayad Marksaeng (6)	26	ASA	
29 Jan	Leopalace21 Myanmar Open	Myanmar	US$750,000	(Australia) Todd Sinnott (1)	19	ASA	
16 Apr	Token Homemate Cup	Mie	130,000,000	(China) Liang Wenchong (2)	16		
23 Apr	Panasonic Open Golf Championship	Chiba	150,000,000	(Japan) Kenichi Kuboya (7)	15	ASA	
30 Apr	The Crowns	Aichi	120,000,000	(Japan) Yūsaku Miyazato (4)	16		
14 May	Japan PGA Championship Nissin Cupnoodles Cup	Okinawa	150,000,000	(Japan) Yūsaku Miyazato (5)	16		Japan major
21 May	Kansai Open Golf Championship	Kyoto	70,000,000	(Japan) Shugo Imahira (1)	16		
28 May	Gateway to The Open Mizuno Open	Okayama	100,000,000	(United States) Chan Kim (1)	16		
4 Jun	Japan Golf Tour Championship; Mori Building Cup Shishido Hills	Ibaraki	150,000,000	(South Africa) Shaun Norris (2)	16		Japan major
9 Jul	Shigeo Nagashima Invitational Sega Sammy Cup	Hokkaidō	150,000,000	(United States) Chan Kim (2)	16		
30 Jul	Dunlop Srixon Fukushima Open	Fukushima	50,000,000	(Japan) Katsumasa Miyamoto (11)	16		
27 Aug	RIZAP KBC Augusta	Fukuoka	100,000,000	(Japan) Yuta Ikeda (17)	16		
3 Sep	Fujisankei Classic	Yamanashi	110,000,000	(South Korea) Ryu Hyun-woo (2)	16		
10 Sep (Note: First two rounds played in August.)	ISPS Handa Match Play	Chiba	210,000,000	(Japan) Shingo Katayama (31)	16		
17 Sep	ANA Open	Hokkaidō	110,000,000	(Japan) Yuta Ikeda (18)	16		
24 Sep	Asia-Pacific Diamond Cup Golf	Chiba	150,000,000	(Japan) Daisuke Kataoka (3)	15	ASA	
1 Oct	Top Cup Tokai Classic	Aichi	110,000,000	(Japan) Satoshi Kodaira (5)	16		
8 Oct	Honma TourWorld Cup	Aichi	100,000,000	(Japan) Yūsaku Miyazato (6)	16		
15 Oct	Japan Open Golf Championship	Gifu	200,000,000	(Japan) Yuta Ikeda (19)	32		Flagship event (Note: Also a Japan major championship.)
22 Oct	Bridgestone Open	Chiba	150,000,000	(Japan) Ryuko Tokimatsu (2)	16 (Note: Points reduced from 20 to 16 due to tournament being shortened to 36 holes because of weather.)		
29 Oct	Mynavi ABC Championship	Hyōgo	150,000,000	(Japan) Tatsuya Kodai (1)	16		
5 Nov	Heiwa PGM Championship	Okinawa	200,000,000	(United States) Chan Kim (3)	16		
12 Nov	Mitsui Sumitomo Visa Taiheiyo Masters	Shizuoka	200,000,000	(Japan) Satoshi Kodaira (6)	18		
19 Nov	Dunlop Phoenix Tournament	Miyazaki	200,000,000	(United States) Brooks Koepka (n/a)	32		
26 Nov	Casio World Open	Kōchi	200,000,000	(United States) Seungsu Han (1)	19		
3 Dec	Golf Nippon Series JT Cup	Tokyo	130,000,000	(Japan) Yūsaku Miyazato (7)	20		Japan major

=== Unofficial events ===
The following events were sanctioned by the Japan Golf Tour, but did not carry official money, nor were wins official.

Date	Tournament	Location	Purse (¥)	Winner(s)	OWGR points	Other tours	Notes
9 Apr	Masters Tournament	United States	US$11,000,000	(Spain) Sergio García	100		Major championship
7 May	Legend Charity Pro-Am	Chiba	50,000,000	(Japan) Kaname Yokoo	n/a		Pro-Am
18 Jun	U.S. Open	United States	US$12,000,000	(United States) Brooks Koepka	100		Major championship
23 Jul	The Open Championship	England	US$10,250,000	(United States) Jordan Spieth	100		Major championship
13 Aug	PGA Championship	United States	US$10,500,000	(United States) Justin Thomas	100		Major championship
10 Dec	Hitachi 3Tours Championship	Chiba	57,000,000	Japan Golf Tour	n/a		Team event

== Money list ==
The money list was based on prize money won during the season, calculated in Japanese yen.

Position	Player	Prize money (¥)
1	(Japan) Yūsaku Miyazato	182,831,982
2	(Japan) Satoshi Kodaira	161,463,405
3	(United States) Chan Kim	132,326,556
4	(Japan) Yuta Ikeda	126,240,438
5	(United States) Seungsu Han	112,798,464

== Awards ==
Award	Winner	Ref.
Most Valuable Player	(Japan) Yūsaku Miyazato	
Rookie of the Year (Shimada Trophy)	(United States) Chan Kim	

== Japan Challenge Tour ==
2017 Japan Challenge Tour season
- Duration: 31 March 2017 – 20 October 2017
- Number of official events: 12
- Money list: (Japan) Tomoharu Otsuki

The 2017 Japan Challenge Tour was the 33rd season of the Japan Challenge Tour, the official development tour to the Japan Golf Tour.

=== Schedule ===
The following table lists official events during the 2017 season.

Date	Tournament	Location	Purse (¥)	Winner (Note: The number in brackets after each winner's name is the number of Japan Challenge Tour events they had won up to and including that tournament. It is rare for someone to accumulate many wins on the Japan Challenge Tour as success at this level usually leads to promotion to the Japan Golf Tour.)
2 Apr	Novil Cup	Tokushima	15,000,000	(Japan) Rikuya Hoshino (1)
28 Apr	Japan Create Challenge	Fukuoka	10,000,000	(Japan) Yasunobu Fukunaga (2)
19 May	Heiwa PGM Challenge I Road to Championship	Ibaraki	10,000,000	(Japan) Terumichi Kakazu (1)
9 Jun	ISPS Handa Global Challenge Cup	Shizuoka	13,000,000	(Japan) Daisuke Matsubara (1)
16 Jun	Royal Golf Club Challenge	Ibaraki	13,000,000	(Japan) Tomoharu Otsuki (1)
23 Jun	Landic Challenge	Fukuoka	10,000,000	(Japan) Tomohiro Umeyama (1)
30 Jun	Minami Akita CC Michinoku Challenge	Akita	10,000,000	(Japan) Keiichi Kaneko (3)
15 Sep	Heiwa PGM Challenge II Road to Championship	Tottori	10,000,000	(South Korea) Kang Ji-man (1)
29 Sep	Elite Grips Challenge	Mie	10,000,000	(Japan) Shigeru Nonaka (4)
7 Oct	Ryo Ishikawa Everyone Project Challenge	Tochigi	10,000,000	(Japan) Konosuke Nakazato (3)
13 Oct	Taiheiyo Club Challenge Tournament	Saitama	10,000,000	(India) Ajeetesh Sandhu (1)
20 Oct	JGTO Novil Final	Chiba	10,000,000	(Japan) Yosuke Iwamoto (1)

=== Money list ===
The money list was based on prize money won during the season, calculated in Japanese yen. The top seven players on the money list (not otherwise exempt) earned status to play on the 2018 Japan Golf Tour.

Position	Player	Prize money (¥)
1	(Japan) Tomoharu Otsuki	3,787,591
2	(Japan) Daisuke Matsubara	3,262,465
3	(Japan) Yasunobu Fukunaga	3,244,872
4	(Japan) Rikuya Hoshino	2,966,811
5	(Japan) Shigeru Nonaka	2,912,518
6	(Japan) Konosuke Nakazato	2,891,770
7	(Japan) Tatsunori Nukaga	2,821,563
8	(South Korea) Kang Ji-man	2,548,817
