= Daisuke Maruyama =

Japanese golfer (born 1971)

Daisuke Maruyama 丸山 大輔
Personal information
- Nationality: Japan
- Born: 16 March 1971 (age 55) Chiba Prefecture, Japan
- Height: 1.75 m (5 ft 9 in)
- Weight: 75 kg (165 lb; 11.8 st)

Career
- Sport: Golf
- Turned professional: 1994
- Current tour: Japan Golf Tour
- Former tour: PGA Tour
- Professional wins: 7

Number of wins by tour
- Japan Golf Tour: 3
- Asian Tour: 2
- Other: 3

Best results in major championships
- Masters Tournament: DNP
- PGA Championship: DNP
- U.S. Open: DNP
- The Open Championship: CUT: 2013

Daisuke Maruyama (丸山 大輔, Maruyama Daisuke; born 16 March 1971) is a Japanese professional golfer currently playing on the Japan Golf Tour.

== Career ==
Maruyama was born in Chiba Prefecture and played his first full season on the Japan Golf Tour in 2001. He picked up his first win on Tour in 2005 at the Fujisankei Classic. His best year on Tour so far was in 2005, with a win, eight top-10s, and 22 of 27 cuts made. He also has three victories on the Japan Challenge Tour at the 2001 PGA Cup Challenge, the 2016 Seven Dreamers Challenge and the 2016 Taiheiyo Club Challenge Tournament.

In 2009, Maruyama won the Asia-Pacific Panasonic Open, a tournament that brings together players from the Japanese and Asian golf tours. Maruyama played on the PGA Tour in 2006 and 2007 after finishing T7 at the 2005 qualifying school. His best finish was T3 at the 2006 The International.

== Professional wins (7) ==
=== Japan Golf Tour wins (3) ===
No.	Date	Tournament	Winning score	Margin of victory	Runner(s)-up
1	4 Sep 2005	Fujisankei Classic	−13 (67-68-65-71=271)	7 strokes	(Japan) Shingo Katayama
2	27 Sep 2009	Asia-Pacific Panasonic Open^{1}	−8 (69-66-67-74=276)	4 strokes	(Japan) Yuta Ikeda, (South Korea) Kim Kyung-tae, (China) Liang Wenchong
3	27 Oct 2013	Bridgestone Open	−10 (68-67-68=203) (Note: Shortened to 54 holes due to weather.)	3 strokes	(South Korea) Jang Ik-jae

^{1}Co-sanctioned by the Asian Tour

Japan Golf Tour playoff record (0–2)

No.	Year	Tournament	Opponents	Result
1	2003	Sun Chlorella Classic	(Australia) Brendan Jones, (Japan) Taichi Teshima	Jones won with birdie on first extra hole
2	2010	Token Homemate Cup	(Japan) Satoru Hirota, (Japan) Koumei Oda	Oda won with birdie on fourth extra hole Hirota eliminated by par on second hole

=== Asian Tour wins (2) ===
No.	Date	Tournament	Winning score	Margin of victory	Runner(s)-up
1	27 Aug 2000	ROC PGA Championship	−17 (65-66-69-71=271)	6 strokes	(Thailand) Prayad Marksaeng
2	27 Sep 2009	Asia-Pacific Panasonic Open^{1}	−8 (69-66-67-74=276)	4 strokes	(Japan) Yuta Ikeda, (South Korea) Kim Kyung-tae, (China) Liang Wenchong

^{1}Co-sanctioned by the Japan Golf Tour

=== Japan Challenge Tour wins (3) ===
No.	Date	Tournament	Winning score	Margin of victory	Runner(s)-up
1	25 Oct 2001	PGA Cup Challenge	−8 (69-67=136)	1 stroke	(Japan) Norio Shinozaki, (Japan) Tatsuhiko Takahashi, (Japan) Harumoto Tsuchiyama
2	9 Sep 2016	Seven Dreamers Challenge	−21 (66-62-64=192)	4 strokes	(Japan) Yosuke Asaji
3	14 Oct 2016	Taiheiyo Club Challenge Tournament	−8 (68-66=134)	1 stroke	(Japan) Kohei Kinoshita, (Japan) Yoshinobu Tsukada

== Results in major championships ==
Tournament	2013
The Open Championship	CUT

CUT = missed the halfway cut
Note: Maruyama only played in The Open Championship.

== Results in The Players Championship ==
Tournament	2007
The Players Championship	WD

WD = withdrew

== Results in World Golf Championships ==
Tournament	2009	2010	2011	2012	2013	2014
Match Play						
Championship						
Invitational						68
Champions	T10					

Top 10
Did not play

"T" = Tied

== See also ==
- 2005 PGA Tour Qualifying School graduates
