= 2010 Japan Golf Tour =

Golf tour season

2010 Japan Golf Tour season
- Duration: 15 April 2010 – 5 December 2010
- Number of official events: 25
- Most wins: (Japan) Yuta Ikeda (4)
- Money list: (South Korea) Kim Kyung-tae
- Most Valuable Player: (Japan) Hiroyuki Fujita
- Rookie of the Year: (Japan) Shunsuke Sonoda

The 2010 Japan Golf Tour was the 38th season of the Japan Golf Tour (formerly the PGA of Japan Tour), the main professional golf tour in Japan since it was formed in 1973.

== Schedule ==
The following table lists official events during the 2010 season.

Date	Tournament	Location	Purse (¥)	Winner (Note: The number in brackets after each winner's name is the number of Japan Golf Tour events they had won up to and including that tournament. This information is only shown for Japan Golf Tour members.)	OWGR points	Other tours (Note: ASA − Asian Tour.)	Notes
18 Apr	Token Homemate Cup	Mie	130,000,000	(Japan) Koumei Oda (4)	18		
25 Apr	Tsuruya Open	Hyōgo	120,000,000	(Japan) Hiroyuki Fujita (9)	18		
2 May	The Crowns	Aichi	120,000,000	(Japan) Ryo Ishikawa (7)	20		
16 May	Japan PGA Championship Nissin Cupnoodle Cup	Nagasaki	140,000,000	(Japan) Toru Taniguchi (16)	20		Japan major
30 May	Diamond Cup Golf	Saitama	120,000,000	(South Korea) Kim Kyung-tae (1)	20		
6 Jun	Japan Golf Tour Championship Citibank Cup Shishido Hills	Ibaraki	120,000,000	(Japan) Katsumasa Miyamoto (8)	22		Japan major
27 Jun	Gateway to The Open Mizuno Open Yomiuri Classic	Hyōgo	130,000,000	(Japan) Shunsuke Sonoda (1)	22		
4 Jul	Toshin Golf Tournament	Mie	60,000,000	(Japan) Yuta Ikeda (5)	18		New tournament
11 Jul	The Championship by Lexus	Ibaraki	150,000,000	(Japan) Takashi Kanemoto (2)	16		
25 Jul	Nagashima Shigeo Invitational Sega Sammy Cup	Hokkaidō	130,000,000	(Japan) Mamo Osanai (4)	18		
1 Aug	Sun Chlorella Classic	Hokkaidō	150,000,000	(Japan) Tadahiro Takayama (3)	20		
22 Aug	Kansai Open Golf Championship	Kyoto	50,000,000	(Japan) Shigeru Nonaka (1)	16		
29 Aug	Vana H Cup KBC Augusta	Fukuoka	110,000,000	(Japan) Hideto Tanihara (9)	18		
5 Sep	Fujisankei Classic	Yamanashi	110,000,000	(Japan) Ryo Ishikawa (8)	18		
19 Sep	ANA Open	Hokkaidō	110,000,000	(Japan) Yuta Ikeda (6)	18		
26 Sep	Asia-Pacific Panasonic Open	Hyōgo	150,000,000	(Australia) Brendan Jones (9)	22	ASA	
3 Oct	Coca-Cola Tokai Classic	Aichi	120,000,000	(Japan) Michio Matsumura (1)	18		
10 Oct	Canon Open	Kanagawa	150,000,000	(Japan) Shinichi Yokota (2)	18		
17 Oct	Japan Open Golf Championship	Aichi	200,000,000	(South Korea) Kim Kyung-tae (2)	32		Flagship event (Note: Also a Japan major championship.)
24 Oct	Bridgestone Open	Chiba	150,000,000	(Japan) Yuta Ikeda (7)	22		
31 Oct	Mynavi ABC Championship	Hyōgo	150,000,000	(South Korea) Kim Kyung-tae (3)	20		
14 Nov	Mitsui Sumitomo Visa Taiheiyo Masters	Shizuoka	150,000,000	(Japan) Ryo Ishikawa (9)	20		
21 Nov	Dunlop Phoenix Tournament	Miyazaki	200,000,000	(Japan) Yuta Ikeda (8)	30		
28 Nov	Casio World Open	Kōchi	200,000,000	(Japan) Michio Matsumura (2)	24		
5 Dec	Golf Nippon Series JT Cup	Tokyo	130,000,000	(Japan) Hiroyuki Fujita (10)	26		Japan major

=== Unofficial events ===
The following events were sanctioned by the Japan Golf Tour, but did not carry official money, nor were wins official.

Date	Tournament	Location	Purse (¥)	Winner(s)	OWGR points	Other tours	Notes
11 Apr	Masters Tournament	United States	US$7,500,000	(United States) Phil Mickelson	100		Major championship
20 Jun	U.S. Open	United States	US$7,500,000	(Northern Ireland) Graeme McDowell	100		Major championship
18 Jul	The Open Championship	Scotland	£4,800,000	(South Africa) Louis Oosthuizen	100		Major championship
12 Aug	Handa Cup Promising Golfers Tournament Under 30	Chiba	20,000,000	(Japan) Shogo Kimura	n/a		
15 Aug	PGA Championship	United States	US$7,500,000	(Germany) Martin Kaymer	100		Major championship
12 Sep	Hyundai Capital Korea-Japan Team Championship	South Korea	US$700,000	Team Japan	n/a		Team event
12 Dec	Hitachi 3Tours Championship	Chiba	57,000,000	Japan Golf Tour	n/a		Team event

== Money list ==
The money list was based on prize money won during the season, calculated in Japanese yen.

Position	Player	Prize money (¥)
1	(South Korea) Kim Kyung-tae	181,103,799
2	(Japan) Hiroyuki Fujita	157,932,927
3	(Japan) Ryo Ishikawa	151,461,479
4	(Japan) Yuta Ikeda	145,043,030
5	(Japan) Michio Matsumura	108,908,063

== Awards ==
Award	Winner	Ref.
Most Valuable Player	(Japan) Hiroyuki Fujita	
Rookie of the Year (Shimada Trophy)	(Japan) Shunsuke Sonoda	

== Japan Challenge Tour ==
2010 Japan Challenge Tour season
- Duration: 9 April 2010 – 22 October 2010
- Number of official events: 11
- Most wins: (Fiji) Dinesh Chand (2)
- Money list: (Fiji) Dinesh Chand

The 2010 Japan Challenge Tour was the 26th season of the Japan Challenge Tour, the official development tour to the Japan Golf Tour.

=== Schedule ===
The following table lists official events during the 2010 season.

Date	Tournament	Location	Purse (¥)	Winner (Note: The number in brackets after each winner's name is the number of Japan Challenge Tour events they had won up to and including that tournament. It is rare for someone to accumulate many wins on the Japan Challenge Tour as success at this level usually leads to promotion to the Japan Golf Tour.)
11 Apr	Novil Cup	Tokushima	15,000,000	(Japan) Soushi Tajima (1)
21 May	Toshin Challenge	Gifu	10,000,000	(Japan) Akira Endo (1)
28 May	Fuji Country Kanai Club Challenge Cup	Gifu	10,000,000	(Fiji) Dinesh Chand (1)
11 Jun	Tohoku Yakurai Cup	Miyagi	10,000,000	(Fiji) Dinesh Chand (2)
19 Jun	Shizu Hills Tommy Cup	Ibaraki	15,000,000	(Japan) Sushi Ishigaki (2)
25 Jun	Tokyu Resort Nasu JGTO Challenge	Tochigi	10,000,000	(Taiwan) Chiang Chen-chih (1)
15 Jul	Boso Country Cup	Chiba	10,000,000	(Japan) Masayoshi Nakayama (1)
20 Aug	Hatoyama Country Club GMA Challenge Tournament	Saitama	10,000,000	(Japan) Satoshi Kodaira (a) (1)
10 Sep	Srixon Challenge	Miyagi	10,000,000	(Japan) Shunta Maeawakura (1)
17 Sep	Itsuurateien JGTO Challenge 2	Fukushima	10,000,000	(Japan) Hirohito Koizumi (1)
22 Oct	JGTO Novil Final	Chiba	10,000,000	(South Korea) Park Sung-joon (1)

=== Money list ===
The money list was based on prize money won during the season, calculated in Japanese yen. The top seven players on the money list earned status to play on the 2011 Japan Golf Tour.

Position	Player	Prize money (¥)
1	(Fiji) Dinesh Chand	4,780,625
2	(Japan) Sushi Ishigaki	4,350,520
3	(Japan) Masanori Kobayashi	3,258,022
4	(Japan) Shunta Maeawakura	3,157,313
5	(Japan) Soushi Tajima	3,090,963
6	(Japan) Hirohito Koizumi	2,966,274
7	(South Korea) Park Sung-joon	2,864,850
