= Kiyoshi Maita =

Japanese professional golfer

Personal information
- Nationality: Japan
- Born: 17 December 1959 (age 66) Kanagawa Prefecture, Japan
- Height: 1.70 m (5 ft 7 in)
- Weight: 75 kg (165 lb; 11.8 st)

Career
- Sport: Golf
- Turned professional: 1985
- Current tour: Japan PGA Senior Tour
- Former tour: Japan Golf Tour
- Professional wins: 8

Number of wins by tour
- Japan Golf Tour: 1
- Other: 7

Kiyoshi Maita (真板 潔, Maita Kiyoshi; born 17 December 1959) is a Japanese professional golfer.

== Career ==
Maita played on the Japan Golf Tour, winning once.

== Professional wins (8) ==
=== Japan Golf Tour wins (1) ===
No.	Date	Tournament	Winning score	Margin of victory	Runner-up
1	10 Sep 2000	Suntory Open	−11 (66-68-68-71=273)	1 stroke	(Japan) Yasuharu Imano

=== Japan PGA Senior Tour wins (7) ===
No.	Date	Tournament	Winning score	Margin of victory	Runner(s)-up
1	9 Jul 2010	PGA Philanthropy Senior Tournament	−8 (70-68-70=208)	2 strokes	(Japan) Yasumi Okuda
2	14 Sep 2013	Komatsu Open	−12 (67-69-68=204)	1 stroke	(Japan) Yasumi Okuda, (Japan) Kazuhiro Takami
3	3 Jul 2016	Nasu Kasumigajo Senior Open	−14 (65-65=130)	2 strokes	(Japan) Yutaka Hagawa, (Japan) Yuya Kamide
4	26 Aug 2016	Hiroshima Senior Golf Tournament	−10 (66-66=132)	Playoff	(Japan) Hiroshi Tominaga, (Japan) Tsuyoshi Yoneyama
5	15 Oct 2016	Sevenhills Cup KBC Senior Open	−9 (68-67=135)	2 strokes	(Japan) Naomichi Ozaki, (Japan) Hidezumi Shirakata, (Japan) Tsukasa Watanabe, (Japan) Tsuyoshi Yoneyama
6	21 Apr 2017	Nojima Champion Cup Hakone Senior Tournament	−8 (71-65=136)	Playoff	(Japan) Kōki Idoki
7	4 Jun 2022	Sumaiida Cup Senior Tournament	−11 (68-68-69=205)	1 stroke	(Japan) Yoichi Shimizu
