= Kōki Idoki =

Japanese professional golfer

Personal information
- Nationality: Japan
- Born: 2 November 1961 (age 64) Ibaraki, Osaka, Japan
- Height: 1.67 m (5 ft 6 in)
- Weight: 62 kg (137 lb; 9.8 st)

Career
- Sport: Golf
- Turned professional: 1982
- Former tours: Japan Golf Tour; PGA Tour Champions; Japan PGA Senior Tour
- Professional wins: 7

Number of wins by tour
- Japan Golf Tour: 2
- PGA Tour Champions: 1
- Other: 4

Best results in major championships
- Masters Tournament: DNP
- PGA Championship: CUT: 2013
- U.S. Open: DNP
- The Open Championship: DNP

Kōki Idoki (井戸木鴻樹, Idoki Kōki; born 2 November 1961) is a Japanese professional golfer who has played his whole career on the Japan Golf Tour.

== Career ==
Idoki, while playing on the Japan Golf Tour, had two victories: the 1990 Kansai Pro Championship and the 1993 NST Niigata Open.

In his first time playing professionally in the United States, he won the 2013 Senior PGA Championship.

== Professional wins (7) ==
=== PGA of Japan Tour wins (2) ===
No.	Date	Tournament	Winning score	Margin of victory	Runners-up
1	1 Jul 1990	Kansai Pro Championship	−9 (69-71-67-72=279)	1 stroke	(Japan) Tōru Nakamura, (Japan) Yūzō Ōyama, (Japan) Takeru Shibata
2	1 Aug 1993	NST Niigata Open	−13 (69-64-68-74=275)	3 strokes	(Singapore) Samson Gimson, (Japan) Hiroya Kamide, (Japan) Yoshinori Kaneko, (Japan) Hajime Meshiai

=== Champions Tour wins (1) ===
Legend
Senior major championships (1)
Other Champions Tour (0)

No.	Date	Tournament	Winning score	Margin of victory	Runners-up
1	26 May 2013	Senior PGA Championship	−11 (71-69-68-65=273)	2 strokes	(United States) Jay Haas, (United States) Kenny Perry

=== Japan PGA Senior Tour wins (4) ===
No.	Date	Tournament	Winning score	Margin of victory	Runner(s)-up
1	3 Nov 2012	Fujifilm Senior Championship	−12 (66-70-68=204)	4 strokes	(Japan) Seiki Okuda, (Japan) Naomichi Ozaki
2	9 Jul 2021	ISPS Handa Tanoshiku Omoshiroi Senior Tournament	−10 (71-63=134)	3 strokes	(Japan) Yoichi Shimizu, (Japan) Norio Shinozaki, (New Zealand) David Smail, (Japan) Katsunari Takahashi, (Japan) Akira Teranishi, (Japan) Taichi Teshima
3	11 Sep 2021	Komatsu Open	−17 (68-66-65=199)	2 strokes	(Japan) Yoichi Shimizu
4	17 Oct 2021	Trust Group Cup Sasebo Senior Open	−8 (69-67=136)	Playoff	(Japan) Shigeru Nonaka

== Results in major championships ==
Tournament	2013
PGA Championship	CUT

CUT = missed the halfway cut
Note: Idoki only played in the PGA Championship.

== Senior major championships ==
=== Wins (1) ===
Year	Championship	54 holes	Winning score	Margin	Runners-up
2013	Senior PGA Championship	5 shot deficit	−11 (71-69-68-65=273)	2 strokes	(United States) Jay Haas, (United States) Kenny Perry

=== Senior results timeline ===
Results are not in chronological order prior to 2017.

Tournament	2012	2013	2014	2015	2016	2017	2018	2019
The Tradition						T68		
Senior PGA Championship		1	T33	CUT	CUT	CUT		
U.S. Senior Open		T23	CUT	T20	CUT	CUT		57
Senior Players Championship		T74						
Senior British Open Championship	T65	13	T52	T40	T30	CUT		

Win
Did not play

CUT = missed the halfway cut
"T" indicates a tie for a place.
