= Dinesh Chand =

Fijian professional golfer

Personal information
- Nationality: Fiji
- Born: 6 February 1972 (age 54)
- Height: 1.90 m (6 ft 3 in)
- Weight: 85 kg (187 lb; 13.4 st)

Career
- Sport: Golf
- Turned professional: 1992
- Current tours: Japan Golf Tour; Asian Tour
- Professional wins: 6

Number of wins by tour
- Japan Golf Tour: 3
- Other: 3

Best results in major championships
- Masters Tournament: DNP
- PGA Championship: DNP
- U.S. Open: DNP
- The Open Championship: CUT: 2001, 2004

Achievements and awards
- Japan Challenge Tour money list winner: 2010

Dinesh Chand (born 6 February 1972) is a Fijian professional golfer who plays mainly on the Japan Golf Tour.

== Professional career ==
At the end of 2009, he lost his full playing rights for the Japan Golf Tour and so decided to play on the developmental Japan Challenge Tour in 2010. He won two events in a row which resulted in him regaining his full playing rights for the second half of the Japan Golf Tour season. He finished second at the 2010 Sun Chlorella Classic.

Chand has three wins on the Japan Golf Tour, and two on the Japan Challenge Tour.

== Professional wins (6) ==
=== Japan Golf Tour wins (3) ===
No.	Date	Tournament	Winning score	Margin of victory	Runner(s)-up
1	5 Apr 1998	Descente Classic Munsingwear Cup	−17 (71-66-66-68=271)	2 strokes	(Paraguay) Carlos Franco, (Japan) Hidemichi Tanaka
2	20 May 2001	Munsingwear Open KSB Cup	−17 (69-68-67-67=271)	2 strokes	(Japan) Toshimitsu Izawa
3	20 Jun 2004	Mandom Lucido Yomiuri Open	−20 (66-68-68-66=268)	4 strokes	(South Korea) Hur Suk-ho

=== Japan Challenge Tour wins (2) ===
No.	Date	Tournament	Winning score	Margin of victory	Runners-up
1	28 May 2010	Fuji Country Kani Club Challenge Cup	−8 (68-68=136)	4 strokes	(Japan) Hiroaki Iijima, (Japan) Sushi Ishigaki, (Japan) Hirohito Koizumi, (Japan) Kiyoshi Maita, (Japan) Hidezumi Shirakata
2	11 Jun 2010	Tohoku Yakurai Cup	−9 (68-65=133)	Playoff	(South Korea) Park Sung-joon, (Japan) Achi Sato

=== Other wins (1) ===
- 2008 Hirao Masaaki Charity Golf

== Results in major championships ==
Tournament	2001	2002	2003	2004
The Open Championship	CUT			CUT

Note: Chand only played in The Open Championship.

Did not play

CUT = missed the half-way cut

== Team appearances ==
- WGC-World Cup (representing Fiji): 2001, 2002
