= Jay Choi =

American professional golfer

Personal information
- Nationality: United States
- Born: September 30, 1983 (age 43) Gunsan, South Korea
- Height: 1.79 m (5 ft 10 in)
- Weight: 80 kg (180 lb; 13 st)

Career
- Sport: Golf
- College: University of New Mexico
- Turned professional: 2006
- Current tour: Japan Golf Tour
- Professional wins: 1

Number of wins by tour
- Japan Golf Tour: 1

Best results in major championships
- Masters Tournament: DNP
- PGA Championship: DNP
- U.S. Open: CUT: 2008
- The Open Championship: DNP

Jay Choi (born September 30, 1983) is an American professional golfer.

== Early life and amateur career ==
Choi was born in Gunsan, South Korea. He graduated from Gahr High School in Cerritos, California and played college golf at the University of New Mexico.

== Professional career ==
Choi played the mini-tours in the U.S. for several years. He has played on the Japan Golf Tour since 2010, and won his first title on the tour in May 2012 at the Totoumi Hamamatsu Open. He has ranked in the top-200 in the Official World Golf Ranking.

== Professional wins (1) ==
=== Japan Golf Tour wins (1) ===
No.	Date	Tournament	Winning score	Margin of victory	Runner-up
1	20 May 2012	Totoumi Hamamatsu Open	−16 (68-71-68-65=272)	1 stroke	(Japan) Yoshinori Fujimoto
