= Park Sung-joon (golfer) =

South Korean golfer

Personal information
- Nationality: South Korea
- Born: 9 June 1986 (age 40) South Korea
- Height: 1.75 m (5 ft 9 in)
- Weight: 73 kg (161 lb; 11.5 st)

Career
- Sport: Golf
- Turned professional: 2006
- Current tour: Korean Tour
- Former tours: PGA Tour; Japan Golf Tour; Web.com Tour; Japan Challenge Tour
- Professional wins: 2
- Highest ranking: 92 (27 October 2013)

Number of wins by tour
- Japan Golf Tour: 1
- Other: 1

Best results in major championships
- Masters Tournament: DNP
- PGA Championship: DNP
- U.S. Open: CUT: 2018
- The Open Championship: DNP

Achievements and awards
- Korean Tour Rookie of the Year: 2023

Park Sung-joon (Korean: 박성준; born 9 June 1986) is a South Korean professional golfer.

== Career ==
Park played on the Japan Golf Tour, where he got one win, the 2013 Vana H Cup KBC Augusta. He ended 5th in the money list that season. In 2014 he joined the Web.com Tour. He finished 44th in the Web.com Tour Finals to earn his PGA Tour card for the 2014–15 season.

Park represented South Korea in the 2011 World Cup.

== Professional wins (2) ==
=== Japan Golf Tour wins (1) ===
No.	Date	Tournament	Winning score	Margin of victory	Runner-up
1	1 Sep 2013	Vana H Cup KBC Augusta	−12 (67-68-69=204) (Note: Shortened to 54 holes due to weather.)	2 strokes	(South Korea) Hwang Jung-gon

Japan Golf Tour playoff record (0–1)

No.	Year	Tournament	Opponents	Result
1	2013	Fujisankei Classic	(Japan) Hideki Matsuyama, (Japan) Hideto Tanihara	Matsuyama won with birdie on second extra hole

=== Japan Challenge Tour wins (1) ===
No.	Date	Tournament	Winning score	Margin of victory	Runners-up
1	22 Oct 2010	JGTO Novil Final	−13 (68-69-66=203)	3 strokes	(Japan) Tatsuya Mitsuhashi, (Japan) Hidezumi Shirakata

== Playoff record ==
Korean Tour playoff record (0–1)

No.	Year	Tournament	Opponent	Result
1	2006	SBS Jungheung Gold Lake Open	(South Korea) Kang Kyung-nam	Lost to eagle on second extra hole

== Results in major championships ==
Tournament	2018
Masters Tournament	
U.S. Open	CUT
The Open Championship	
PGA Championship	

Did not play

CUT = missed the half-way cut

== Team appearances ==
- World Cup (representing South Korea): 2011

== See also ==
- 2014 Web.com Tour Finals graduates
