= 2010 Open Championship =

Coordinates: 56.343°N 2.803°W

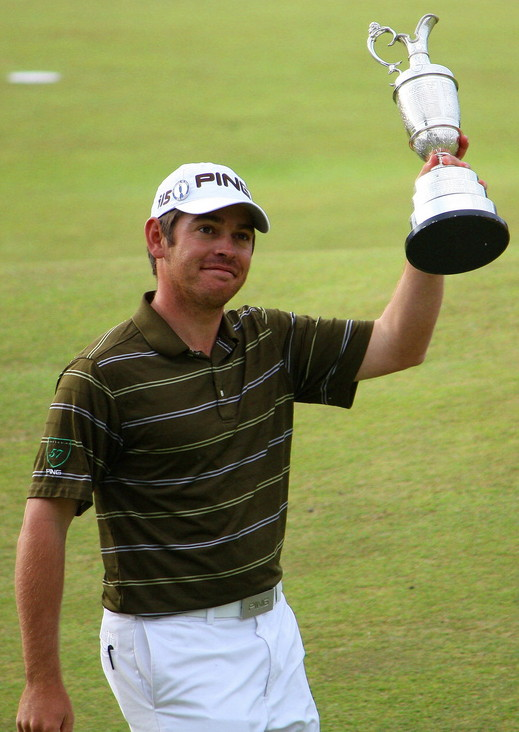
- Champion Louis Oosthuizen with the Claret Jug.

Tournament information
- Dates: 15–18 July 2010
- Location: St Andrews, Scotland
- Course: Old Course at St Andrews
- Organized by: The R&A
- Tours: European Tour; PGA Tour; Japan Golf Tour

Statistics
- Par: 72
- Length: 7,305 yards (6,680 m)
- Field: 156 players, 77 after cut
- Cut: 146 (+2)
- Prize fund: £4,800,000 €5,713,920 $7,372,762
- Winner's share: £850,000 €1,011,840 $1,305,593

Champion
- (South Africa) Louis Oosthuizen
- 272 (−16)

Location in Scotland
Location in Fife, Scotland

The 2010 Open Championship was a men's major golf championship and was held from 15 to 18 July over the Old Course at St Andrews, Fife, Scotland. It was the 150th anniversary of the founding of The Open in 1860, and the 28th time The Open was played at St Andrews. Usually branded with the edition of the championship (for example, the previous year's Open was branded as the "138th Open Championship"), due to the sesquicentennial anniversary, the R&A branded this as the "150th Anniversary Open Championship" rather than "139th Open Championship." The standard branding returned the following year.

Louis Oosthuizen won his only major championship with 272 (−16), seven strokes clear of runner-up Lee Westwood. A stroke behind in third were Paul Casey, Rory McIlroy, and Henrik Stenson.

== Venue ==
St Andrews is considered to be the home of golf, and as such, the current Open Championship rota means that the Old Course plays host to the championship every five years. Given the course's standing, even more attention is given to The Open whenever it visits the historic links.

The previous two Opens at St Andrews, in 2000 and 2005, were both won by Tiger Woods, the first with a record 19-under-par total. The primary change to the course from 2005 was at the par-4 17th hole; a new tee extended the Road Hole to 495 yards (453 m), an increase of 40 yards (37 m). Although not altered, the measurement angle of the dogleg was revised for hole #7, resulting in a new length of 371 yards (339 m), a reduction of 19 yards (17 m).

=== Card of the course ===
Hole	Name	Yards	Par	Hole	Name	Yards	Par
1	Burn	376	4	10	Bobby Jones	386	4
2	Dyke	453	4	11	High (In)	174	3
3	Cartgate (Out)	397	4	12	Heathery (In)	348	4
4	Ginger Beer	480	4	13	Hole O'Cross (In)	465	4
5	Hole O'Cross (Out)	568	5	14	Long	618	5
6	Heathery (Out)	412	4	15	Cartgate (In)	455	4
7	High (Out)	371	4	16	Corner of the Dyke	423	4
8	Short	175	3	17	Road	495	4
9	End	352	4	18	Tom Morris	357	4
Out		3,584	36	In		3,721	36
				Total		7,305	72

Previous lengths of the course for The Open Championship (since 1950):

- 2005: 7,279 yards (6,656 m)
- 2000: 7,115 yards (6,506 m)
- 1995: 6,933 yards (6,340 m)
- 1990: 6,933 yards (6,340 m)
- 1984: 6,933 yards (6,340 m)
- 1978: 6,933 yards (6,340 m)
- 1970: 6,957 yards (6,361 m)
- 1964: 6,926 yards (6,333 m)
- 1960: 6,936 yards (6,342 m)
- 1955: 6,936 yards (6,342 m)

== Field ==
Each year, around two-thirds of The Open Championship field consists of players that are fully exempt from qualifying for the Open. The players who have already qualified for the 2010 Open Championship are listed below. Each player is classified according to the first category in which he qualified, but other categories are shown in parentheses.

1. Past Open Champions aged 60 or under on 18 July 2010
Mark Calcavecchia, Stewart Cink (2,5,6,16,20), Ben Curtis (2,4), John Daly, David Duval (2), Ernie Els (2,4,5,6,7,16,20), Nick Faldo, Todd Hamilton (2), Pádraig Harrington (2,4,6,7,14,16), Paul Lawrie, Tom Lehman, Justin Leonard (4,5,20), Sandy Lyle, Mark O'Meara, Tom Watson (4,5), Tiger Woods (2,4,6,12,14,16,20)
(Eligible but not playing: Ian Baker-Finch, Seve Ballesteros, Nick Price, Bill Rogers)
(Greg Norman (4) withdrew due to a shoulder injury.)

2. The Open Champions for 2000–2009

3. Past Open Champions born between 17 July 1944 and 19 July 1948
(Eligible but not playing: Johnny Miller)

4. Past Open Champions finishing in the top 10 and tying for 10th place in The Open Championship 2005–2009

5. First 10 and anyone tying for 10th place in the 2009 Open Championship
Thomas Aiken, Luke Donald (6,16), Mathew Goggin, Retief Goosen (6,7,16,20), Søren Hansen (7), Richard S. Johnson, Lee Westwood (6,7), Chris Wood

6. The first 50 players on the Official World Golf Rankings for Week 21, 2010
Robert Allenby (7,20), Ángel Cabrera (12,13,16,20), Paul Casey (7,8), K. J. Choi, Tim Clark (15,20), Ben Crane, Ross Fisher (7), Jim Furyk (16,20), Sergio García (7,15), Lucas Glover (12,16,20), Peter Hanson (7), Yuta Ikeda (25), Ryo Ishikawa (20), Thongchai Jaidee (7,21), Miguel Ángel Jiménez (7,8), Dustin Johnson (16), Zach Johnson (13,16,20), Robert Karlsson, Martin Kaymer (7), Matt Kuchar, Graeme McDowell (12), Rory McIlroy (7), Hunter Mahan (16,20), Phil Mickelson (13,14,16,20), Edoardo Molinari, Francesco Molinari (7), Kevin Na (16), Geoff Ogilvy (7,12,16,20), Sean O'Hair (16,20), Louis Oosthuizen, Kenny Perry (16,20), Ian Poulter (7), Álvaro Quirós (7), Charl Schwartzel (7), Adam Scott (20), Michael Sim (22), Henrik Stenson (7,15), Steve Stricker (16,20), Camilo Villegas (7,20), Nick Watney (16), Oliver Wilson (7), Yang Yong-eun (14,16,20)
(Anthony Kim (20) withdrew due to thumb surgery.)

7. First 30 in the PGA European Tour Final Race to Dubai for 2009
Simon Dyson, Gonzalo Fernández-Castaño, Anders Hansen (23), Søren Kjeldsen, Thomas Levet, Ross McGowan, Alex Norén, Robert Rock

8. The BMW PGA Championship winners for 2008–2010
Simon Khan

9. First 3 and anyone tying for 3rd place, not exempt having applied above, in the top 20 of the 2010 PGA European Tour Race to Dubai on completion of the 2010 BMW PGA Championship
Fredrik Andersson Hed, Rhys Davies (the only two golfers in the top 20 of the Race to Dubai at that time who were not already exempt)

10. First 2 European Tour members and any European Tour members tying for 2nd place, not exempt, in a cumulative money list taken from all official PGA European Tour events from OWGR Week 19 up to and including the BMW International Open and including the U.S. Open
Stephen Gallacher, Grégory Havret

11. The leading player, not exempt having applied above, in the first 5 and ties of each of the 2010 Alstom Open de France and the 2010 Barclays Scottish Open
Alejandro Cañizares, Darren Clarke

12. The U.S. Open Champions for 2006–2010

13. The U.S. Masters Champions for 2006–2010
Trevor Immelman

14. The U.S. PGA Champions for 2005–2009

15. The U.S. PGA Tour Players Champions for 2008–2010

16. Top 30 on the Official 2009 PGA Tour FedEx Cup points list
Jason Dufner, Brian Gay, Jerry Kelly, Marc Leishman, Steve Marino, John Senden, Heath Slocum, Scott Verplank, Mike Weir (20)
(David Toms withdrew due to a shoulder injury.)

17. First 3 and anyone tying for 3rd place, not exempt having applied above, in the top 20 of the FedEx Cup points list of the 2010 PGA Tour on completion of the HP Byron Nelson Championship
Jason Bohn, Bill Haas, J. B. Holmes

18. First 2 PGA Tour members and any PGA Tour members tying for 2nd place, not exempt, in a cumulative money list taken from The Players Championship and the five PGA Tour events leading up to and including the 2010 AT&T National
Justin Rose, Bubba Watson

19. The leading player, not exempt having applied above, in the first 5 and ties of each of the 2010 AT&T National and the 2010 John Deere Classic
Paul Goydos, Ryan Moore

20. Playing members of the 2009 Presidents Cup teams
Vijay Singh

21. First place on the 2009 Asian Tour Order of Merit

22. First place on the 2009 PGA Tour of Australasia Order of Merit

23. First place on the 2009 Sunshine Tour Order of Merit

24. The 2009 Japan Open Champion
Ryuichi Oda

25. First 2, not exempt, on the Official Money List of the Japan Golf Tour for 2009
Koumei Oda

26. The leading 4 players, not exempt, in the 2010 Mizuno Open Yomiuri Classic
Hirofumi Miyase, Park Jae-bum, Shunsuke Sonoda, Toru Taniguchi

27. First 2 and anyone tying for 2nd place, not exempt having applied (26) above, in a cumulative money list taken from all official 2010 Japan Golf Tour events up to and including the 2010 Mizuno Open Yomiuri Classic
Kim Kyung-tae, Katsumasa Miyamoto

28. The Senior British Open Champion for 2009
Loren Roberts

29. The 2010 Amateur Champion
Jin Jeong (a)

30. The 2009 U.S. Amateur Champion
An Byeong-hun (a)

31. The 2009 European Individual Amateur Champion
Victor Dubuisson (a)

International Final Qualifying

Australasia: Kurt Barnes, Ewan Porter, Peter Senior
Africa: Josh Cunliffe, Darren Fichardt, Jean Hugo
Asia: Danny Chia, Chun Jae-han (a), Hiroyuki Fujita, Noh Seung-yul
America: Glen Day, Martin Laird, George McNeill, Cameron Percy, Tom Pernice Jr., Tim Petrovic, D. A. Points, Bo Van Pelt
Europe: Thomas Bjørn, Andrew Coltart, Bradley Dredge, Ignacio Garrido, Estanislao Goya, José Manuel Lara, Shane Lowry, Gareth Maybin, Colin Montgomerie, Marcel Siem

Local Final Qualifying (Tuesday 29 June)

Fairmont St Andrews: Laurie Canter (a), Mark Haastrup, Zane Scotland
Kingsbarns Links: Jamie Abbott (a), Colm Moriarty, Tom Whitehouse
Ladybank: Phillip Archer, Simon Edwards, Tyrrell Hatton (a)
Scotscraig: Gary Clark, Paul Streeter, Steven Tiley

- (a) denotes amateur

Alternates
Drawn from the Official World Golf Rankings of 4 July 2010 (provide the player was entered in the Open and did not withdraw from qualifying):

- Rickie Fowler awarded exemption as highest ranked player not already qualified.
- Jeff Overton awarded exemption as highest ranked player not already qualified.
- Ricky Barnes replaced Anthony Kim.
- Davis Love III replaced David Toms.
- Jason Day replaced Greg Norman.

== Round summaries ==
=== First round ===
Thursday, 15 July 2010

For the 28th time, the Open Championship took to the Old Course at St Andrews, and it played perhaps the easiest it has in all its history, with 73 players under par. Rory McIlroy tied a major championship record with 63 (−9), only the eighth 63 in Open Championship history, and the 22nd in major championship history. He was bogey-free and played his last ten holes at −8. Louis Oosthuizen was alone in second with 65.

A big surprise of the first round was John Daly; the 1995 champion at St Andrews was at 66, in five-way tie for third with Bradley Dredge, Peter Hanson, Andrew Coltart, and Steven Tiley. Tiger Woods, who switched from his old Scotty Cameron putter to a Nike Method putter that week, headlined the group of nine tied for eighth at 67 (−5). That group included PGA Champion Yang Yong-eun and Lee Westwood. 2009 champion Stewart Cink and U.S. Open champion Graeme McDowell were at 71, tied for 58th, and Masters champion Phil Mickelson struggled with the putter to a 73.

Place	Player	Score	To par
1	(Northern Ireland) Rory McIlroy	63	−9
2	(South Africa) Louis Oosthuizen	65	−7
T3	(Scotland) Andrew Coltart	66	−6
T3	(United States) John Daly	66	−6
T3	(Wales) Bradley Dredge	66	−6
T3	(Sweden) Peter Hanson	66	−6
T3	(England) Steven Tiley	66	−6
T8	(Sweden) Fredrik Andersson Hed	67	−5
T8	(Spain) Alejandro Cañizares	67	−5
T8	(United States) Lucas Glover	67	−5
T8	(United States) Sean O'Hair	67	−5
T8	(Germany) Marcel Siem	67	−5
T8	(United States) Nick Watney	67	−5
T8	(England) Lee Westwood	67	−5
T8	(United States) Tiger Woods	67	−5
T8	(South Korea) Yang Yong-eun	67	−5

=== Second round ===
Friday, 16 July 2010
Saturday, 17 July 2010

Mark Calcavecchia had the earliest tee time and took advantage of the morning conditions to shoot a 67 (−5) for a 137 (−7). Louis Oosthuizen played in the next group and also shot 67 to move into first place at 132 (−12), five shots ahead of Calcavecchia. Phil Mickelson posted a 71 to get to even-par 144. However, the conditions were significantly worse in the afternoon. Rory McIlroy followed his 63 (−9) in the opening round with 80 (+8) for 143 (−1).

Jason Dufner's ball would not stay still on the 7th green due to the gale force 40 mph (65 km/h) winds, which caused play to be suspended for 66 minutes. Winds also caused backup on the course, and some rounds took 7½ hours. Tiger Woods had a bad start with bogeys on the first two holes, and despite three-putting four times that day, grinded out to shoot 73 (+1) on Friday for 140 (−4), 8 shots behind the leader. Notable players who missed the cut were Ernie Els, Pádraig Harrington, Tom Watson, and Jim Furyk.

Place	Player	Score	To par
1	(South Africa) Louis Oosthuizen	65-67=132	−12
2	(United States) Mark Calcavecchia	70-67=137	−7
T3	(Spain) Alejandro Cañizares	67-71=138	−6
T3	(England) Paul Casey	69-69=138	−6
T3	(South Korea) Jin Jeong (a)	68-70=138	−6
T3	(England) Lee Westwood	67-71=138	−6
T7	(United States) Ricky Barnes	68-71=139	−5
T7	(South Africa) Retief Goosen	69-70=139	−5
T7	(Sweden) Peter Hanson	66-73=139	−5
T7	(Spain) Miguel Ángel Jiménez	72-67=139	−5
T7	(United States) Tom Lehman	71-68=139	−5
T7	(Northern Ireland) Graeme McDowell	71-68=139	−5
T7	(United States) Sean O'Hair	67-72=139	−5

Amateurs: Jeong (−6), Chun (+3), An (+7), Abbott (+8), Dubuisson (+9), Hatton (+11), Canter (+16).

- Due to darkness, the second round was suspended at 9:43 pm BST and completed on Saturday morning.

=== Third round ===
Saturday, 17 July 2010

Mark Calcavecchia quickly fell out of contention when he played his first five holes in seven over par. Tiger Woods struggled with the flat stick, with 35 putts for the round and ten three-putts through 54 holes. Phil Mickelson mounted a charge at four-under-par through 13 holes, but fell back with a double-bogey on 16. Louis Oosthuizen's consistency never wavered, and he ended the day with a four-shot lead over Paul Casey, who shot a five-under 67.

Place	Player	Score	To par
1	(South Africa) Louis Oosthuizen	65-67-69=201	−15
2	(England) Paul Casey	69-69-67=205	−11
3	(Germany) Martin Kaymer	69-71-68=208	−8
T4	(Sweden) Henrik Stenson	68-74-67=209	−7
T4	(Spain) Alejandro Cañizares	67-71-71=209	−7
T4	(England) Lee Westwood	67-71-71=209	−7
7	(United States) Dustin Johnson	69-72-69=210	−6
T8	(United States) Nick Watney	67-73-71=211	−5
T8	(South Africa) Retief Goosen	69-70-72=211	−5
T8	(United States) Sean O'Hair	67-72-72=211	−5
T8	(United States) Ricky Barnes	68-71-72=211	−5

=== Final round ===
Sunday, 18 July 2010

Louis Oosthuizen shot a final round 71 to win his first major championship by seven shots. He played consistently all day, including an eagle at the drivable 9th hole. Paul Casey was in contention until a triple bogey at the 12th, which Oosthuizen birdied. Earlier in the day, Rickie Fowler shot 67 to move into a tie for 14th, despite opening the championship with a 79. Tiger Woods switched back to his old putter with improved results, but poor ball striking left him with an even-par 72. Phil Mickelson made a charge early in his round, but poor putting led to him a 75. Rory McIlroy bounced back well from his 80 on Friday and finished tied for third.

Place	Player	Score	To par	Money (£)
1	(South Africa) Louis Oosthuizen	65-67-69-71=272	−16	850,000
2	(England) Lee Westwood	67-71-71-70=279	−9	500,000
T3	(England) Paul Casey	69-69-67-75=280	−8	256,667
T3	(Northern Ireland) Rory McIlroy	63-80-69-68=280	−8	256,667
T3	(Sweden) Henrik Stenson	68-74-67-71=280	−8	256,667
6	(South Africa) Retief Goosen	69-70-72-70=281	−7	175,000
T7	(Germany) Martin Kaymer	69-71-68-74=282	−6	121,250
T7	(United States) Sean O'Hair	67-72-72-71=282	−6	121,250
T7	(England) Robert Rock	68-78-67-69=282	−6	121,250
T7	(United States) Nick Watney	67-73-71-71=282	−6	121,250

Amateurs: Jeong (−4).

Complete Final Leaderboard

==== Scorecard ====
Hole	1	2	3	4	5	6	7	8	9	10	11	12	13	14	15	16	17	18
Par	4	4	4	4	5	4	4	3	4	4	3	4	4	5	4	4	4	4
(South Africa) Oosthuizen	−15	−15	−15	−15	−15	−15	−15	−14	−16	−16	−16	−17	−17	−17	−17	−17	−16	−16
(England) Westwood	−7	−7	−7	−7	−7	−7	−7	−7	−8	−8	−8	−7	−8	−9	−9	−9	−8	−9
(Northern Ireland) McIlroy	−4	−4	−4	−4	−5	−5	−5	−5	−6	−6	−5	−6	−6	−7	−7	−7	−7	−8
(Sweden) Stenson	−7	−7	−7	−7	−7	−7	−8	−8	−8	−8	−8	−8	−8	−8	−8	−8	−8	−8
(England) Casey	−11	−10	−10	−10	−10	−11	−11	−11	−12	−12	−12	−9	−9	−9	−8	−8	−8	−8

Cumulative tournament scores, relative to par

Eagle	Birdie	Bogey	Double bogey	Triple bogey+
