= Canon Open =

Tournament information
- Location: Totsuka-ku, Yokohama, Kanagawa, Japan
- Established: 2008
- Course: Totsuka Country Club
- Par: 72
- Length: 7,191 yards (6,575 m)
- Tour: Japan Golf Tour
- Format: Stroke play
- Prize fund: ¥150,000,000
- Month played: October
- Final year: 2012

Tournament record score
- Aggregate: 271 Yuta Ikeda (2012)
- To par: −17 as above

Final champion
- (Japan) Yuta Ikeda
- Location in Japan Location in the Kanagawa Prefecture

The Canon Open (キヤノンオープン, Kyanon ōpun) was a professional golf tournament on the Japan Golf Tour from 2008 to 2012. It was played in October at the Totsuka Country Club in Totsuka-ku, Yokohama, Kanagawa and sponsored by Canon.

== Winners ==
Year	Winner	Score	To par	Margin of victory	Runner(s)-up	Purse (¥)	Winner's share (¥)
2012	(Japan) Yuta Ikeda (2)	271	−17	3 strokes	(South Korea) Hwang Jung-gon (Japan) Taichi Teshima	150,000,000	30,000,000
2011	(Japan) Kenichi Kuboya	274	−14	2 strokes	(Australia) Brad Kennedy (Japan) Mamo Osanai (Thailand) Chawalit Plaphol	150,000,000	30,000,000
2010	(Japan) Shinichi Yokota	274	−14	2 strokes	(Japan) Ryo Ishikawa	150,000,000	30,000,000
2009	(Japan) Yuta Ikeda	200 (Note: Shortened to 54 holes due to weather.)	−16	4 strokes	(Japan) Tomohiro Kondo (United States) Han Lee	150,000,000	30,000,000
2008	(Japan) Makoto Inoue	275	−13	1 stroke	(Japan) Hiroyuki Fujita (Japan) Yasuharu Imano (Japan) Yūsaku Miyazato (Japan) Taichi Teshima	200,000,000	40,000,000
