= Makoto Inoue =

Japanese professional golfer (born 1974)

Personal information
- Nationality: Japan
- Born: 7 December 1974 (age 51) Yamaguchi Prefecture, Japan
- Height: 1.72 m (5 ft 8 in)
- Weight: 72 kg (159 lb; 11.3 st)

Career
- Sport: Golf
- College: Hosei University
- Turned professional: 1998
- Current tour: Japan Golf Tour
- Professional wins: 3

Number of wins by tour
- Japan Golf Tour: 2
- Other: 1

Best results in major championships
- Masters Tournament: DNP
- PGA Championship: DNP
- U.S. Open: DNP
- The Open Championship: CUT: 2013

Makoto Inoue (井上 信, Inoue Makoto; born 7 December 1974 in Yamaguchi Prefecture) is a Japanese professional golfer.

== Career ==
Inoue plays on the Japan Golf Tour, and has won twice.

== Professional wins (3) ==
=== Japan Golf Tour wins (2) ===
No.	Date	Tournament	Winning score	Margin of victory	Runners-up
1	31 Oct 2004	ABC Championship	−15 (69-67-66-71=273)	1 stroke	(Japan) Ryoken Kawagishi, (Japan) Toru Suzuki
2	12 Oct 2008	Canon Open	−13 (70-71-69-65=275)	1 stroke	(Japan) Hiroyuki Fujita, (Japan) Yasuharu Imano, (Japan) Yūsaku Miyazato, (Japan) Taichi Teshima

=== Japan Challenge Tour wins (1) ===
No.	Date	Tournament	Winning score	Margin of victory	Runner-up
1	8 Jun 2001	Aiful Challenge Cup Spring	−10 (67-67=134)	1 stroke	(Japan) Nobuhiro Masuda
