= Toshin =

Toshin may refer to

- Toshin Golf Tournament, Japan
- Tōshin (塔身), a component of a Hōkyōintō (Japanese pagoda)
- Ogre (Tekken), a video game character, also called Toshin in Japanese
- Dōshin, low-ranking officials of the Tokugawa shogunate in Edo period Japan
