= Mynavi ABC Championship =

Tournament information
- Location: Katō, Hyōgo, Japan
- Established: 1971
- Course: ABC Golf Club
- Par: 72
- Length: 7,217 yards (6,599 m)
- Tour: Japan Golf Tour
- Format: Stroke play
- Prize fund: ¥120,000,000
- Month played: November
- Final year: 2023

Tournament record score
- Aggregate: 263 Ryuichi Oda (2014)
- To par: −24 Keita Nakajima (2023)

Final champion
- (Japan) Keita Nakajima

Location map
- Location in Japan Location in the Hyōgo Prefecture

The Mynavi ABC Championship (マイナビABCチャンピオンシップゴルフトーナメント, Mainabi ei-bī-shī champyon gorufu tōnamento) was a professional golf tournament on the Japan Golf Tour. It was played at the ABC Golf Club in Katō, Hyōgo, usually in October or November. It was founded in 1971 as a Japan vs. United States team match (there was also individual prize money and the event counted as an official win on tour). In 1988, it became a full-field individual event. The event is sponsored by Asahi Broadcasting Corporation and Mynavi Corporation.

== History ==
The tournament was founded in 1971 as the Miki Gold Cup, a nine-man team match between golfers from Japan and the United States. Results were based on the aggregate of the best seven scores from each team after 54 holes of stroke play competition; there was also a prize for the best individual score. The event was renamed as the ABC Cup in 1972. The following year, the best eight scores were used to determine the winner, and in 1975 the event was extended to 72 holes.

Between 1982 and 1984 the event was titled as the Goldwin Cup (1982–83) and the Uchida Yoko Cup (1984), during which time it was contested as stroke play matches with two points were awarded for a match win and one point for a tie. The first two rounds were played as better ball pairs and the final two rounds as singles, from which the scores were used to determine the individual winner. In 1985 the event reverted to its earlier format and name.

In 1988, the tournament became a regular 72 hole stroke play event on the Japan Golf Tour, since when it has always been held at ABC Golf Club in Katō, Hyōgo. Sponsored by Philip Morris International, it was titled using the Lark brand as the ABC Lark Cup or Lark Cup for five years, until 1994 when it became the Philip Morris Championship. After Philip Morris sponsorship came to an end, in 2003 the event became titled the ABC Championship, with Mynavi being added as title sponsor in 2008.

In 2023, following the 2024 schedule announcement by the Japan Golf Tour, it was confirmed that the 2023 tournament would be the last and would not return from 2024 onwards.

== Tournament hosts ==
Years	Venue	Location
1988–present	ABC Golf Club	Katō, Hyōgo
1983	Taiheiyo Club (Rokko Course)	Hyōgo
1982, 1984	Sobhu Country Club (Sobhu Course)	Inzai, Chiba
1979–1981, 1985–1987	Sports Shinko Country Club	Kawanishi, Hyōgo
1976–1978	Harima Country Club	Ono, Hyōgo
1975	Ibaraki Kokusai Golf Club	Ibaraki, Osaka
1973–1974	Hashimoto Country Club	Hashimoto, Wakayama
1972	Ikeda Country Club	Ikeda, Osaka
1971	Perfect Liberty (PL) Country Club	Tondabayashi, Osaka

== Winners ==
Year	Winner	Score	To par	Margin of victory	Runner(s)-up
Mynavi ABC Championship
2023	(Japan) Keita Nakajima	264	−24	3 strokes	(South Africa) Shaun Norris
2022	(Japan) Mikumu Horikawa	271	−17	2 strokes	(Japan) Hiroshi Iwata (Japan) Daijiro Izumida (Japan) Riki Kawamoto
2021	(Japan) Yosuke Asaji	272	−16	2 strokes	(Japan) Mikumu Horikawa (Japan) Tomohiro Ishizaka
2020	Cancelled due to the COVID-19 pandemic				
2019	(South Korea) Hwang Jung-gon	269	−19	1 stroke	(Japan) Shugo Imahira
2018	(Japan) Yuta Kinoshita	273	−15	Playoff	(Japan) Masahiro Kawamura
2017	(Japan) Tatsuya Kodai	203 (Note: Shortened to 54 holes due to weather.)	−13	1 stroke	(South Korea) Im Sung-jae (Japan) Yūsaku Miyazato (Japan) Ryutaro Nagano
2016	(Japan) Shingo Katayama (4)	276	−12	1 stroke	(Japan) Shintaro Kobayashi
2015	(South Korea) Kim Kyung-tae (2)	272	−12	2 strokes	(Japan) Daisuke Kataoka (Australia) Won Joon Lee (Japan) Katsumasa Miyamoto
2014	(Japan) Ryuichi Oda	263	−21	5 strokes	(Japan) Koumei Oda (Japan) Hideto Tanihara
2013	(Japan) Yuta Ikeda	269	−15	Playoff	(South Korea) Hur Suk-ho
2012	(United States) Han Lee	271	−17	1 stroke	(Japan) Katsumasa Miyamoto
2011	(Japan) Koichiro Kawano	273	−15	Playoff	(South Korea) Bae Sang-moon
2010	(South Korea) Kim Kyung-tae	275	−13	1 stroke	(Japan) Ryo Ishikawa
2009	(Japan) Toru Suzuki	274	−14	5 strokes	(Japan) Takashi Kanemoto
2008	(Japan) Ryo Ishikawa	279	−9	1 stroke	(Japan) Keiichiro Fukabori
ABC Championship
2007	(Philippines) Frankie Miñoza	274	−14	Playoff	(South Korea) Lee Dong-hwan
2006	(Japan) Shingo Katayama (3)	271	−17	Playoff	(South Korea) Yang Yong-eun
2005	(Japan) Shingo Katayama (2)	274	−14	2 strokes	(Fiji) Dinesh Chand
2004	(Japan) Makoto Inoue	273	−15	1 stroke	(Japan) Ryoken Kawagishi (Japan) Toru Suzuki
2003	(Japan) Shingo Katayama	265	−23	9 strokes	(Japan) Katsumasa Miyamoto
Philip Morris K.K. Championship
2002	(Australia) Brendan Jones	269	−19	2 strokes	(Japan) Toshimitsu Izawa
2001	(Japan) Toshimitsu Izawa	272	−16	1 stroke	(Japan) Hidemichi Tanaka (Japan) Toru Taniguchi
Philip Morris Championship
2000	(Japan) Toru Taniguchi	276	−12	1 stroke	(Japan) Hidemichi Tanaka (Japan) Shingo Katayama
1999	(Japan) Ryoken Kawagishi (2)	270	−18	1 stroke	(Japan) Katsunori Kuwabara
1998	(Japan) Masashi Ozaki (2)	275	−13	1 stroke	(Paraguay) Carlos Franco (Japan) Mitsuo Harada
1997	(United States) Brian Watts (2)	280	−8	2 strokes	(Japan) Kaname Yokoo
1996	(Japan) Naomichi Ozaki (2)	278	−10	4 strokes	(United States) Russ Cochran (United States) David Ishii (Japan) Masashi Ozaki
1995	(Japan) Hidemichi Tanaka	278	−10	1 stroke	(Japan) Naomichi Ozaki (Japan) Nobumitsu Yuhara
1994	(United States) Brian Watts	276	−12	1 stroke	(Japan) Masashi Ozaki (Japan) Naomichi Ozaki (United States) Duffy Waldorf
Lark Cup
1993	(Japan) Hajime Meshiai	283	−5	1 stroke	(Japan) Masahiro Kuramoto (Japan) Naomichi Ozaki
1992	(Japan) Naomichi Ozaki	279	−9	1 stroke	(Japan) Masashi Ozaki
ABC Lark Cup
1991	(Japan) Yoshikazu Yokoshima	280	−8	2 strokes	(Australia) Roger Mackay
1990	(Japan) Ryoken Kawagishi	277	−11	2 strokes	(Japan) Masashi Ozaki
1989	(Australia) Brian Jones	280	−8	4 strokes	(Japan) Toshiaki Sudo
1988	(Japan) Katsunari Takahashi	277	−11	1 stroke	(Japan) Masashi Ozaki

=== Japan vs USA team matches ===
Year	Winning team	Score (Note: Aggregate scores counting best 7 from 9 in 1971 and 1972; aggregate scores counting best 8 from 9 between 1973 and 1981, and from 1985; matches with 2 points for a win, 1 for a tie between 1982 and 1984.)	Margin of victory	Individual winner(s)	Score	To par	Margin of victory	Runner(s)-up	Ref.
ABC Japan-U.S. Match
1987	Japan	2,227	3 strokes	(United States) Andy Bean	269	−19	5 strokes	(Japan) Masahiro Kuramoto	
1986	United States	2,229	7 strokes	(United States) Curtis Strange	271	−17	4 strokes	(United States) Chip Beck	
1985	Japan	2,557	2 strokes	(Japan) Tateo Ozaki (United States) Corey Pavin	276	−12	Title shared		
Uchida Yoko Cup Japan vs USA Match
1984	United States	30–18		(United States) Tom Watson (2)	135	−7	1 stroke	(United States) Mark O'Meara (Japan) Naomichi Ozaki	
Goldwin Cup Japan vs USA
1983	United States	29–19		(Japan) Tsuneyuki Nakajima	141	−3	1 stroke	(United States) Hale Irwin	
1982	United States	33–15		(United States) Bob Gilder (United States) Calvin Peete	134	−10	Title shared		
ABC Cup Japan vs USA
1981	United States	2,246	35 strokes	(United States) Bobby Clampett	271	−17	7 strokes	(Japan) Akira Yabe	
ABC Japan vs USA Golf Matches
1980	Japan; United States	2,280	Tie	(United States) Jerry Pate	276	−12	1 stroke	(United States) Tom Purtzer (Japan) Norio Suzuki	
1979	Japan	2,306	5 strokes	(United States) Tom Purtzer	276	−12	10 strokes	(United States) Bill Rogers	
1978	Japan	2,273	53 strokes	(Japan) Isao Aoki (2)	273	−15	5 strokes	(Japan) Kosaku Shimada	
1977	Japan	2,079	2 strokes	(Japan) Isao Aoki	280	−8	2 strokes	(United States) Tom Weiskopf	
1976	Japan	2,273	15 strokes	(United States) Tom Watson	277	−11	3 strokes	(Japan) Isao Aoki	
1975	Japan	2,266	42 strokes	(Japan) Tōru Nakamura	273	−15	7 strokes	(United States) Al Geiberger	
1974	United States	1,752	9 strokes	(Japan) Teruo Sugihara	209	−7	1 stroke	(United States) Hubert Green	
1973	Japan	1,785	17 strokes	(United States) Al Geiberger	218	+2	2 strokes	(Japan) Takashi Murakami	
1972	United States	1,488	18 strokes	(United States) Tommy Aaron	209	−4	1 stroke	(United States) Bert Yancey	
Miki Gold Cup
1971	United States	1,484	9 strokes	(United States) Billy Casper (Japan) Masashi Ozaki	208	−8	Title shared		
