= Diamond Cup Golf =

Professional golf tournament

ACN Championship
Tournament information
- Location: Miki, Hyōgo, Japan
- Established: 1969
- Course: Miki Golf Club
- Par: 70
- Length: 7,163 yards (6,550 m)
- Organized by: Japan Golf Association; Asia-Pacific Golf Confederation; Mitsubishi Corporation
- Tours: Japan Golf Tour; Asian Tour
- Format: Stroke play
- Prize fund: ¥120,000,000
- Month played: November

Tournament record score
- Aggregate: 264 Takumi Kanaya (2024); 264 Ryu Hyun-woo (2024)
- To par: −26 Brandt Jobe (1995)

Current champion
- (Japan) Yuta Ikeda

Location map
- Location in Japan Location in the Ibaraki Prefecture

The Diamond Cup Golf (アジアパシフィックオープンゴルフチャンピオンシップ ダイヤモンドカップゴルフ, Ajia pashifikku opun gorufu chanpionshippu Daiyamondo kappu gorufu) is a professional golf tournament on the Japan Golf Tour. Founded in 1969, the event has been hosted at different courses throughout Japan, including on all four major islands. In 2026, the purse was ¥120,000,000, with ¥24,000,000 going to the winner. From 2014 to 2019 the tournament was co-sanctioned by the Asian Tour.

== Winners ==
Year	Tour(s) (Note: ASA − Asian Tour; JPN − Japan Golf Tour.)	Winner	Score	To par	Margin of victory	Runner(s)-up	Ref.
ACN Championship
2026	JPN	(Japan) Yuta Ikeda (2)	270	−14	Playoff	(Japan) Ryunosuke Furukawa (Japan) Kohei Okada	
2025	JPN	(Japan) Yuta Suigura	200 (Note: Shortened to 54 holes due to weather.)	−13	3 strokes	(Japan) Shu Fukuzumi (Japan) Shugo Imahira (Japan) Naoyuki Kataoka (Japan) Takashi Ogiso (Japan) Tatsunori Shogenji	
2024	JPN	(Japan) Takumi Kanaya	264	−20	Playoff	(South Korea) Ryu Hyun-woo	
2023	JPN	(Japan) Yuki Inamori	271	−17	Playoff	(South Korea) Song Young-han	
Asia Pacific Open Golf Championship Diamond Cup
2022	ASA, JPN	(Japan) Shugo Imahira	272	−8	1 stroke	(Japan) Hiroshi Iwata (Japan) Yuto Katsuragawa (Japan) Kaito Onishi (Japan) Kosuke Suzuki (a)	
Asia-Pacific Diamond Cup Golf
2021	JPN	(Japan) Rikuya Hoshino	275	−13	4 strokes	(Philippines) Juvic Pagunsan	
2020	ASA, JPN	Cancelled due to the COVID-19 pandemic					
2019	ASA, JPN	(Japan) Yosuke Asaji	281	−3	1 stroke	(United States) Micah Lauren Shin (Japan) Ren Yonezawa (a)	
2018	ASA, JPN	(Japan) Yuta Ikeda	269	−15	6 strokes	(South Africa) Justin Harding	
2017	ASA, JPN	(Japan) Daisuke Kataoka	272	−12	2 strokes	(Thailand) Poom Saksansin (Japan) Tadahiro Takayama	
2016	ASA, JPN	(Taiwan) Chan Shih-chang	270	−10	2 strokes	(Japan) Ippei Koike	
2015	ASA, JPN	(South Korea) Kim Kyung-tae (2)	271	−9	3 strokes	(Japan) Yuta Ikeda (Japan) Toshinori Muto	
2014	ASA, JPN	(Japan) Hiroyuki Fujita	278	−6	2 strokes	(Thailand) Kiradech Aphibarnrat (South Korea) Hur Suk-ho (United States) Jason Knutzon	
Diamond Cup Golf
2013	JPN	(Japan) Hideki Matsuyama	279	−9	2 strokes	(Australia) Brad Kennedy (South Korea) Kim Hyung-sung (South Korea) Park Sung-joon	
2012	JPN	(Japan) Hiroyuki Fujita	274	−14	3 strokes	(Thailand) Kiradech Aphibarnrat	
2011	JPN	(Japan) Koumei Oda	272	−16	4 strokes	(Japan) Toshinori Muto (Japan) Kaname Yokoo	
2010	JPN	(South Korea) Kim Kyung-tae	272	−16	2 strokes	(Japan) Koumei Oda	
Mitsubishi Diamond Cup Golf
2009	JPN	(Japan) Takashi Kanemoto	283	−5	Playoff	(Australia) Brendan Jones	
2008	JPN	(Thailand) Prayad Marksaeng	274	−10	1 stroke	(Japan) Shintaro Kai	
2007	JPN	(Japan) Tetsuji Hiratsuka (2)	282	−2	1 stroke	(Japan) Satoru Hirota (Japan) Kiyoshi Miyazato	
2006	JPN	(Japan) Kaname Yokoo	275	−9	2 strokes	(Japan) Nozomi Kawahara (Japan) Toru Suzuki	
2005	JPN	(South Korea) Jang Ik-jae	275	−5	3 strokes	(Japan) Shingo Katayama (Japan) Ryoken Kawagishi	
2004	JPN	(Japan) Tetsuji Hiratsuka	275	−13	5 strokes	(Japan) Hidemasa Hoshino	
Diamond Cup Tournament
2003	JPN	(United States) Todd Hamilton	276	−12	3 strokes	(Australia) Steven Conran	
2002	JPN	(Japan) Tsuneyuki Nakajima (4)	269	−19	2 strokes	(Japan) Tomohiro Kondo (Japan) Hirofumi Miyase (United States) Christian Peña	
2001	JPN	(Japan) Toshimitsu Izawa	277	−11	Playoff	(Japan) Hiroyuki Fujita (Japan) Yuji Igarashi	
Mitsubishi Motors Tournament
2000	JPN	(Japan) Hirofumi Miyase	276	−8	Playoff	(Japan) Toru Taniguchi	
1999	JPN	(Japan) Tsuyoshi Yoneyama	268	−16	Playoff	(Japan) Kazuhiko Hosokawa	
Mitsubishi Galant Tournament
1998	JPN	(Japan) Toru Taniguchi	268	−16	1 stroke	(Japan) Kazuhiko Hosokawa	
1997	JPN	(Japan) Masashi Ozaki (2)	278	−10	2 strokes	(Japan) Satoshi Higashi (Japan) Kōki Idoki (Japan) Tōru Nakamura	
1996	JPN	(Japan) Masashi Ozaki	279	−9	Playoff	(United States) Todd Hamilton	
1995	JPN	(United States) Brandt Jobe	266	−26	6 strokes	(Japan) Masahiro Kuramoto	
1994	JPN	(Japan) Katsuyoshi Tomori	205	−11	6 strokes	(Japan) Tsuneyuki Nakajima	
1993	JPN	(Taiwan) Chen Tze-chung	277	−11	4 strokes	(Australia) Brian Jones (Japan) Yoshi Mizumaki (Japan) Tateo Ozaki	
1992	JPN	(Japan) Isao Aoki (2)	277	−11	4 strokes	(Taiwan) Chen Tze-chung (Japan) Saburo Fujiki	
1991	JPN	(Japan) Koichi Suzuki	280	−8	1 stroke	(Japan) Isao Aoki (Japan) Tsuneyuki Nakajima	
1990	JPN	(Japan) Isao Aoki	289	+1	3 strokes	(Japan) Masashi Ozaki (Japan) Teruo Sugihara (Japan) Tsuyoshi Yoneyama	
1989	JPN	(Japan) Tateo Ozaki	284	−4	2 strokes	(Japan) Masanobu Kimura	
1988	JPN	(Australia) Brian Jones (3)	271	−17	Playoff	(Japan) Naomichi Ozaki	
1987	JPN	(Australia) Brian Jones (2)	283	−5	3 strokes	(Japan) Nobuo Serizawa (Japan) Koichi Suzuki	
1986	JPN	(Japan) Tsuneyuki Nakajima (3)	280	−8	1 stroke	(Taiwan) Chen Tze-ming	
1985	JPN	(Australia) Brian Jones	272	−12	Playoff	(Japan) Nobumitsu Yuhara	
1984	JPN	(Japan) Haruo Yasuda (2)	275	−13	4 strokes	(Japan) Kouichi Inoue (Japan) Yoshitaka Yamamoto	
1983	JPN	(Japan) Tsuneyuki Nakajima (2)	278	−10	6 strokes	(Taiwan) Lu Hsi-chuen	
1982	JPN	(Australia) Graham Marsh (3)	271	−13	Playoff	(Japan) Teruo Sugihara	
1981	JPN	(Taiwan) Lu Hsi-chuen	289	+1	Playoff	(Japan) Tōru Nakamura (Japan) Teruo Sugihara	
1980	JPN	(Japan) Tsuneyuki Nakajima	276	−12	4 strokes	(Japan) Yoshihisa Iwashita (Australia) Graham Marsh	
1979	JPN	(Japan) Tōru Nakamura (2)	285	−3	1 stroke	(Japan) Yoshio Kusayanagi	
1978	JPN	(Japan) Tōru Nakamura	280	−8	1 stroke	(Taiwan) Hsu Sheng-san (Japan) Norio Suzuki	
1977	JPN	(Taiwan) Hsu Sheng-san	277	−11	3 strokes	(Japan) Takaaki Kono (Australia) Graham Marsh (Japan) Teruo Sugihara	
Dunlop Tournament
1976	JPN	(Japan) Yoshikazu Yokoshima	274	−14	2 strokes	(Japan) Isao Aoki	
1975	JPN	(Japan) Norio Suzuki	278	−10	2 strokes	(Myanmar) Mya Aye	
1974	JPN	(Australia) Graham Marsh (2)	272	−16	3 strokes	(Japan) Masashi Ozaki (Japan) Teruo Sugihara	
1973	JPN	(Philippines) Ben Arda	280	−8	4 strokes	(Japan) Masashi Ozaki	
1972		(Australia) Graham Marsh	271	−17	5 strokes	(Philippines) Ben Arda	
1971		(Australia) Peter Thomson	280	−8	1 stroke	(Japan) Haruo Yasuda	
1970		(Japan) Haruo Yasuda	137	−7	2 strokes	(Japan) Fujio Ishii (Japan) Takashi Murakami	
1969		(Japan) Takaaki Kono					
