= Honma TourWorld Cup =

Japanese professional golf tournament

Tournament information
- Location: Toyota, Aichi, Japan
- Established: 2015
- Course: Kyowa Country Club
- Par: 71
- Length: 7,190 yards (6,570 m)
- Tour: Japan Golf Tour
- Format: Stroke play
- Prize fund: ¥100,000,000
- Final year: 2017

Tournament record score
- Aggregate: 262 Yūsaku Miyazato (2017)
- To par: −22 as above

Final champion
- (Japan) Yūsaku Miyazato
- Location in Japan Location in the Aichi Prefecture

The Honma TourWorld Cup was a professional golf tournament on the Japan Golf Tour. It was first played in 2015, and was held at Ishioka Golf Club in Omitama, Ibaraki for two years before moving to Kyowa Country Club in Toyota, Aichi. The purse for the final event in 2017 was ¥100,000,000, with ¥20,000,000 going to the winner.

== Winners ==
Year	Winner	Score	To par	Margin of victory	Runner(s)-up
2017	(Japan) Yūsaku Miyazato	262	−22	3 strokes	(Japan) Shingo Katayama
2016	(Japan) Yuta Ikeda	270	−14	Playoff	(South Korea) Song Young-han
2015	(South Korea) Lee Kyoung-hoon	268	−16	1 stroke	(Japan) Tomohiro Kondo (Japan) Ryuichi Oda (Japan) Taichi Teshima (China) Wu Ashun
