= ANA Open =

Tournament information
- Location: Kitahiroshima, Hokkaido, Japan
- Established: 1972
- Courses: Sapporo Golf Club (Wattsu Course)
- Par: 72
- Length: 7,063 yards (6,458 m)
- Tour: Japan Golf Tour
- Format: Stroke play
- Prize fund: ¥100,000,000
- Month played: September

Tournament record score
- Aggregate: 263 Hirotaro Naito (2026)
- To par: −25 as above

Current champion
- (Japan) Hirotaro Naito

Location map
- Location in Japan Location in Hokkaido

The ANA Open (ANAオープンゴルフトーナメント, Ei-enu-ei ōpun golufu tōnamento) is a professional golf tournament on the Japan Golf Tour. Founded as the Sapporo Open, it has been sponsored by All Nippon Airways since 1973, initially as the ANA Sapporo Open. It is usually held in September each year at the Sapporo Golf Club in Kitahiroshima, Hokkaido.

Sapporo's Wattsu and Yuni courses have both played host to the tournament. The tournament scoring record is 268 (20 under par), set by Masashi Ozaki in 1994. Ozaki also holds the all-time record of wins at the tournament with eight. The 2021 purse was ¥110,000,000, of which the winner's share was ¥20,000,000.

== Winners ==
Year	Winner	Score	To par	Margin of victory	Runner(s)-up	Ref.
ANA Open
2026	(Japan) Hirotaro Naito	263	−25	5 strokes	(Japan) Taihei Sato	
2025	(Japan) Takumi Kanaya	271	−17	Playoff	(Japan) Ryo Ishikawa	
2024	(Japan) Aguri Iwasaki	268	−20	2 strokes	(Japan) Kota Kaneko (Japan) Ryutaro Nagano	
2023	(Japan) Hideto Tanihara	270	−18	1 stroke	(Japan) Koshiro Maeda (South Korea) Song Young-han	
2022	(Japan) Tomoharu Otsuki	269	−19	Playoff	(Japan) Ryo Ishikawa	
2021	(Zimbabwe) Scott Vincent	270	−18	3 strokes	(Japan) Tomoharu Otsuki	
2020	Cancelled due to the COVID-19 pandemic					
2019	(Japan) Yosuke Asaji	272	−16	Playoff	(United States) Seungsu Han (Japan) Terumichi Kakazu (South Africa) Shaun Norris (Japan) Ryuko Tokimatsu	
2018	Cancelled due to the earthquake in Hokkaido					
2017	(Japan) Yuta Ikeda (2)	275	−13	Playoff	(Japan) Shugo Imahira (Japan) Ryuko Tokimatsu	
2016	(Australia) Brendan Jones	270	−18	1 stroke	(Japan) Yuta Ikeda	
2015	(Japan) Ryo Ishikawa	272	−16	2 strokes	(Japan) Yūsaku Miyazato	
2014	(Japan) Katsumasa Miyamoto	270	−18	Playoff	(Japan) Hideto Tanihara	
2013	(Japan) Koumei Oda	273	−15	4 strokes	(Japan) Shingo Katayama (South Korea) Lee Kyoung-hoon	
2012	(Japan) Hiroyuki Fujita	272	−16	1 stroke	(Australia) Kurt Barnes (Japan) Yuta Ikeda (South Korea) Kim Hyung-sung (China) Liang Wenchong	
2011	(Australia) Kurt Barnes	275	−13	1 stroke	(Japan) Shingo Katayama (Japan) Tomohiro Kondo (Japan) Koumei Oda	
2010	(Japan) Yuta Ikeda	274	−14	1 stroke	(United States) Jay Choi (South Korea) Kim Do-hoon	
2009	(Japan) Toru Taniguchi	272	−16	4 strokes	(South Korea) Kim Kyung-tae (Japan) Tsuneyuki Nakajima (Japan) Kazuhiro Yamashita	
2008	(Japan) Azuma Yano	273	−15	4 strokes	(Japan) Toshinori Muto (Japan) Tsuneyuki Nakajima	
2007	(Japan) Norio Shinozaki	277	−7	Playoff	(Japan) Yasuharu Imano (Thailand) Chawalit Plaphol	
2006	(Japan) Tomohiro Kondo	274	−10	1 stroke	(Japan) Kiyoshi Maita (Japan) Kaname Yokoo	
2005	(Japan) Keiichiro Fukabori (2)	274	−14	Playoff	(Japan) Yasuharu Imano	
2004	(Thailand) Chawalit Plaphol	271	−17	1 stroke	(South Korea) Yang Yong-eun	
2003	(Taiwan) Yeh Wei-tze	277	−11	1 stroke	(Japan) Masashi Ozaki (Japan) Tsuyoshi Yoneyama	
2002	(Japan) Masashi Ozaki (8)	271	−17	1 stroke	(Japan) Hiroyuki Fujita	
2001	(Taiwan) Lin Keng-chi	273	−15	2 strokes	(Japan) Kazuhiro Kinjo (Japan) Tsuneyuki Nakajima	
2000	(Japan) Nobuhito Sato	282	−6	1 stroke	(United States) Christian Peña	
1999	(Japan) Kazuhiko Hosokawa	277	−11	1 stroke	(Japan) Naomichi Ozaki (Japan) Katsuyoshi Tomori	
1998	(Japan) Keiichiro Fukabori	279	−9	2 strokes	(United States) Lee Janzen (Japan) Katsumasa Miyamoto	
1997	(Japan) Shinichi Yokota	273	−15	3 strokes	(Myanmar) Zaw Moe (Japan) Tateo Ozaki	
1996	(Paraguay) Carlos Franco	282	−6	1 stroke	(Japan) Masahiro Kuramoto	
1995	(Japan) Masashi Ozaki (7)	279	−9	3 strokes	(South Africa) Ernie Els	
1994	(Japan) Masashi Ozaki (6)	268	−20	9 strokes	(Japan) Kiyoshi Murota	
1993	(Japan) Tsuneyuki Nakajima (4)	274	−14	4 strokes	(Japan) Naomichi Ozaki (Australia) Peter Senior (Japan) Katsunari Takahashi	
1992	(Japan) Masashi Ozaki (5)	280	−8	4 strokes	(Japan) Ryoken Kawagishi	
1991	(Japan) Akiyoshi Ohmachi	282	−6	2 strokes	(Japan) Ryoken Kawagishi	
1990	(Japan) Tsuneyuki Nakajima (3)	277	−11	3 strokes	(Japan) Masashi Ozaki	
1989	(Japan) Masashi Ozaki (4)	280	−8	6 strokes	(Wales) Ian Woosnam	
1988	(Japan) Naomichi Ozaki	278	−10	Playoff	(Australia) Brian Jones	
1987	(Japan) Isao Aoki	282	−6	1 stroke	(Japan) Tsukasa Watanabe	
1986	(Japan) Masahiro Kuramoto (2)	281	−7	2 strokes	(Japan) Isao Aoki	
1985	(Japan) Tsuneyuki Nakajima (2)	277	−11	2 strokes	(Japan) Masahiro Kuramoto	
ANA Sapporo Open
1984	(Japan) Pete Izumikawa	280	−8	Playoff	(Japan) Satsuki Takahashi	
1983	(Japan) Tsuneyuki Nakajima	282	−6	5 strokes	(Japan) Isao Aoki	
1982	(Japan) Norio Suzuki	278	−10	1 stroke	(Japan) Isao Aoki	
1981	(Japan) Masahiro Kuramoto	282	−6	3 strokes	(Japan) Kikuo Arai	
1980	(Japan) Teruo Sugihara (3)	283	−5	1 stroke	(Japan) Kikuo Arai	
1979	(Australia) Graham Marsh	284	−4	2 strokes	(Japan) Kikuo Arai	
1978	(Japan) Teruo Sugihara (2)	284	−4	1 stroke	(Japan) Fujio Kobayashi	
1977	(Japan) Teruo Sugihara	287	−1	1 stroke	(Japan) Yasuhiro Miyamoto	
1976	(Japan) Takashi Murakami	285	−3	3 strokes	(Japan) Masashi Ozaki	
1975	(Taiwan) Hsieh Yung-yo	277	−11	2 strokes	(Japan) Takashi Murakami	
1974	(Japan) Masashi Ozaki (3)	282	−6	Playoff	(Japan) Isao Aoki	
1973	(Japan) Masashi Ozaki (2)	283	−5	2 strokes	(Taiwan) Hsieh Min-Nan	
Sapporo Open
1972	(Japan) Masashi Ozaki	282	−6	4 strokes	(Japan) Kosaku Shimada (Japan) Hideyo Sugimoto	
