= Yuta Ikeda =

Japanese golfer (born 1985)

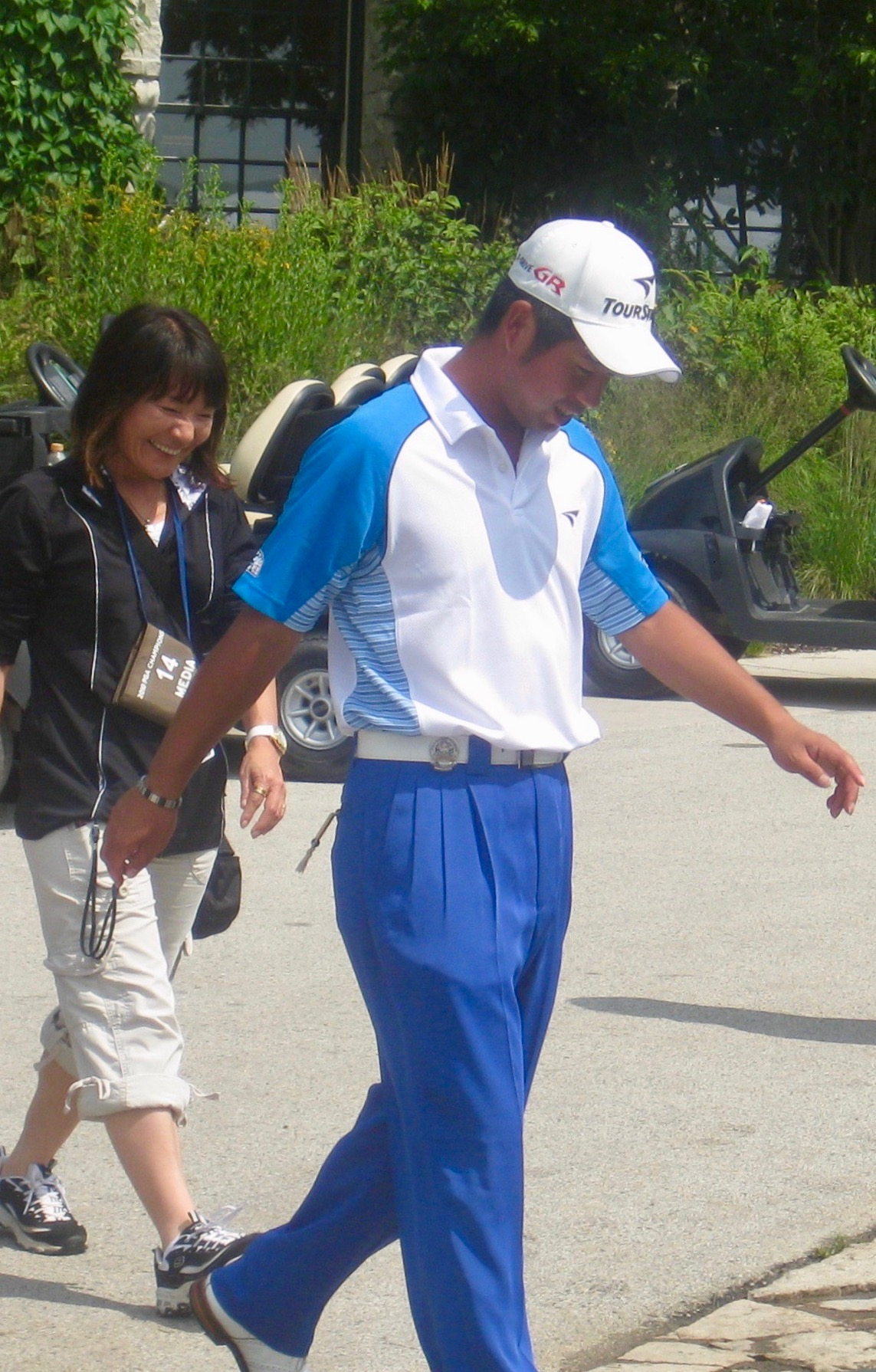
- Ikeda at the 2010 PGA Championship

Personal information
- Nationality: Japan
- Born: 22 December 1985 (age 40) Chiba Prefecture, Japan
- Height: 1.76 m (5 ft 9 in)
- Weight: 76 kg (168 lb; 12.0 st)

Career
- Sport: Golf
- College: Tohoku Fukushi University
- Turned professional: 2008
- Current tour: Japan Golf Tour
- Professional wins: 25
- Highest ranking: 33 (29 November 2009)

Number of wins by tour
- Japan Golf Tour: 22 (8th all-time)
- Asian Tour: 2
- Other: 3

Best results in major championships
- Masters Tournament: 29th: 2010
- PGA Championship: T33: 2016
- U.S. Open: T58: 2010
- The Open Championship: T38: 2011

Achievements and awards
- Japan Golf Tour Rookie of the Year: 2009
- Japan Golf Tour money list winner: 2016
- Japan Golf Tour Most Valuable Player: 2016
Medal record
Summer Universiade
Bronze medal – third place	2007 Bangkok	Men's team

Yuta Ikeda (Japanese: 池田勇太; born 22 December 1985) is a Japanese professional golfer.

== Professional career ==
Ikeda has played on the Japan Golf Tour since 2008. Since his maiden victory in 2009, he has won a minimum of one tournament per season through 2017 and has a total of 22 victories.

Ikeda has featured in the top 50 of the Official World Golf Ranking twice. In late 2009 he reached a high of 33rd. In late 2016/early 2017 he was again 33rd in the rankings.

== Amateur wins ==
- 2002 Japan Junior Golf Championships
- 2003 Japan Junior Golf Championships, Junior World Golf Championships

== Professional wins (25) ==
=== Japan Golf Tour wins (22) ===
Legend
Flagship events (2)
Japan majors (3) (Note: The 2014 and 2017 Japan Open Golf Championships were also Japan major championships.)
Other Japan Golf Tour (19)

No.	Date	Tournament	Winning score	Margin of victory	Runner(s)-up
1	14 Jun 2009	Japan PGA Championship	−14 (65-67-69-65=266)	7 strokes	(Japan) Mitsuhiro Tateyama
2	30 Aug 2009	Vana H Cup KBC Augusta	−21 (69-66-69-63=267)	Playoff	(Japan) Yasuharu Imano
3	11 Oct 2009	Canon Open	−16 (64-72-64=200) (Note: Shortened to 54 holes due to weather.)	4 strokes	(Japan) Tomohiro Kondo, (United States) Han Lee
4	25 Oct 2009	Bridgestone Open	−16 (67-67-71-65=270)	2 strokes	(Japan) Kenichi Kuboya
5	19 Jul 2010	Toshin Golf Tournament	−17 (68-66-64-73=271)	3 strokes	(Japan) Shunsuke Sonoda
6	22 Sep 2010	ANA Open	−14 (70-71-66-67=274)	1 stroke	(United States) Jay Choi, (South Korea) Kim Do-hoon
7	24 Oct 2010	Bridgestone Open (2)	−23 (67-71-65-62=265)	3 strokes	(Japan) Michio Matsumura
8	21 Nov 2010	Dunlop Phoenix Tournament	−15 (67-66-70-66=269)	2 strokes	(South Korea) Kim Kyung-tae
9	31 Jul 2011	Sun Chlorella Classic	−14 (66-72-64-72=274)	1 stroke	(Japan) Tetsuji Hiratsuka
10	7 Oct 2012	Canon Open (2)	−17 (66-68-68-69=271)	3 strokes	(Japan) Taichi Teshima
11	3 Nov 2013	Mynavi ABC Championship	−15 (63-69-70-67=269)	Playoff	(South Korea) Hur Suk-ho
12	19 Oct 2014	Japan Open Golf Championship	−10 (64-68-66-72=270)	1 stroke	(Japan) Shingo Katayama, (Japan) Satoshi Kodaira
13	30 Aug 2015	RIZAP KBC Augusta (2)	−20 (66-65-71-66=268)	5 strokes	(Japan) Koumei Oda
14	24 Apr 2016	Panasonic Open Golf Championship^{1}	−13 (67-73-66-65=271)	3 strokes	(Australia) Marcus Fraser, (South Korea) Kim Kyung-tae
15	9 Oct 2016	Honma TourWorld Cup	−14 (68-67-69-66=270)	Playoff	(South Korea) Song Young-han
16	27 Nov 2016	Casio World Open	−13 (72-64-67=203)	1 stroke	(Japan) Ryuji Masaoka
17	27 Aug 2017	RIZAP KBC Augusta (3)	−18 (69-67-67-67=270)	3 strokes	(Japan) Kunihiro Kamii
18	17 Sep 2017	ANA Open (2)	−13 (70-69-65-71=275)	Playoff	(Japan) Shugo Imahira, (Japan) Ryuko Tokimatsu
19	15 Oct 2017	Japan Open Golf Championship (2)	−8 (67-66-67-72=272)	1 stroke	(Japan) Takumi Kanaya (a)
20	23 Sep 2018	Asia-Pacific Diamond Cup Golf^{1}	−15 (69-66-66-68=269)	6 strokes	(South Africa) Justin Harding
21	2 Jun 2019	Gateway to The Open Mizuno Open	−7 (70-74-66-71=281)	1 stroke	(United States) Chan Kim
22	8 Nov 2026	ACN Championship (2)	−14 (70-67-66-67=270)	Playoff	(Japan) Ryunosuke Furukawa, (Japan) Kohei Okada

^{1}Co-sanctioned by the Asian Tour

Japan Golf Tour playoff record (5–2)

No.	Year	Tournament	Opponent(s)	Result
1	2009	Vana H Cup KBC Augusta	(Japan) Yasuharu Imano	Won with birdie on second extra hole
2	2012	Toshin Golf Tournament	(China) Wu Ashun	Lost to birdie on fourth extra hole
3	2013	Mynavi ABC Championship	(South Korea) Hur Suk-ho	Won with par on first extra hole
4	2016	Honma TourWorld Cup	(South Korea) Song Young-han	Won with birdie on first extra hole
5	2016	Heiwa PGM Championship	(Japan) Hideto Tanihara	Lost to birdie on first extra hole
6	2017	ANA Open	(Japan) Shugo Imahira, (Japan) Ryuko Tokimatsu	Won with birdie on first extra hole
7	2026	ACN Championship	(Japan) Ryunosuke Furukawa, (Japan) Kohei Okada	Won with par on fourth extra hole Okada eliminated by par on first hole

=== Japan Challenge Tour wins (1) ===
No.	Date	Tournament	Winning score	Margin of victory	Runners-up
1	10 Jul 2008	Everlife Cup Challenge Tournament	−9 (65-68=133)	3 strokes	(Japan) Norihiko Furusho, (Japan) Taigen Tsumagari

=== Other wins (2) ===
- 2012 Legend Charity Pro-Am
- 2013 Legend Charity Pro-Am

== Results in major championships ==
Tournament	2009	2010	2011	2012	2013	2014	2015	2016	2017	2018
Masters Tournament		29	CUT						CUT	CUT
U.S. Open		T58						CUT	CUT	
The Open Championship	CUT	CUT	T38				CUT	T72	CUT	T51
PGA Championship		CUT	T45					T33	CUT	T65

Tournament	2019
Masters Tournament	
PGA Championship	
U.S. Open	
The Open Championship	CUT

Did not play

CUT = missed the half-way cut
"T" = tied for place

=== Summary ===
Tournament	Wins	2nd	3rd	Top-5	Top-10	Top-25	Events	Cuts made
Masters Tournament	0	0	0	0	0	0	4	1
PGA Championship	0	0	0	0	0	0	5	3
U.S. Open	0	0	0	0	0	0	3	1
The Open Championship	0	0	0	0	0	0	8	3
Totals	0	0	0	0	0	0	20	8

- Most consecutive cuts made – 2 (four times)
- Longest streak of top-10s – 0

== Results in World Golf Championships ==
Results not in chronological order prior to 2015.

Tournament	2009	2010	2011	2012	2013	2014	2015	2016	2017	2018
Championship		T22	T55						T61	T46
Match Play		R64	R64						T51	T29
Invitational		T69	75							
Champions	T51	T30	T29	T72						T64

Did not play

QF, R16, R32, R64 = Round in which player lost in match play
"T" = tied

== Team appearances ==
Amateur

- Eisenhower Trophy (representing Japan): 2004, 2006
- Bonallack Trophy (representing Asia/Pacific): 2004 (winners), 2006

Professional

- Royal Trophy (representing Asia): 2011
- World Cup (representing Japan): 2011
- EurAsia Cup (representing Asia): 2018

== See also ==
- List of golfers with most Japan Golf Tour wins
- Lowest rounds of golf
