= 2011 Japan Golf Tour =

Golf tour season

2011 Japan Golf Tour season
- Duration: 14 April 2011 – 4 December 2011
- Number of official events: 25
- Most wins: (South Korea) Bae Sang-moon (3)
- Money list: (South Korea) Bae Sang-moon
- Most Valuable Player: (South Korea) Bae Sang-moon
- Rookie of the Year: (South Korea) Park Jae-bum

The 2011 Japan Golf Tour was the 39th season of the Japan Golf Tour (formerly the PGA of Japan Tour), the main professional golf tour in Japan since it was formed in 1973.

== Schedule ==
The following table lists official events during the 2011 season.

Date	Tournament	Location	Purse (¥)	Winner (Note: The number in brackets after each winner's name is the number of Japan Golf Tour events they had won up to and including that tournament. This information is only shown for Japan Golf Tour members.)	OWGR points	Other tours (Note: ASA − Asian Tour.)	Notes
17 Apr	Token Homemate Cup	Mie	130,000,000	(Japan) Tadahiro Takayama (4)	20		
24 Apr	Tsuruya Open	Hyōgo	120,000,000	(Japan) Tomohiro Kondo (5)	22		
1 May	The Crowns	Aichi	120,000,000	(Australia) Brendan Jones (10)	18		
15 May	Japan PGA Championship Nissin Cupnoodle Cup	Hyogo	150,000,000	(Japan) Hiroo Kawai (1)	22		Japan major
22 May	Totoumi Hamamatsu Open	Shizuoka	100,000,000	(Japan) Masanori Kobayashi (1)	18		New tournament
29 May	Diamond Cup Golf	Chiba	120,000,000	(Japan) Koumei Oda (5)	22		
5 Jun	Japan Golf Tour Championship Citibank Cup Shishido Hills	Ibaraki	150,000,000	(South Korea) Park Jae-bum (1)	18		Japan major
26 Jun	Gateway to The Open Mizuno Open	Okayama	110,000,000	(South Korea) Hwang Jung-gon (1)	22		
24 Jul	Nagashima Shigeo Invitational Sega Sammy Cup	Hokkaidō	130,000,000	(South Korea) Kim Kyung-tae (4)	20		
31 Jul	Sun Chlorella Classic	Hokkaidō	150,000,000	(Japan) Yuta Ikeda (9)	18		
21 Aug	Kansai Open Golf Championship	Hyogo	50,000,000	(South Korea) Cho Min-gyu (1)	16		
28 Aug	Vana H Cup KBC Augusta	Fukuoka	110,000,000	(South Korea) Bae Sang-moon (1)	20		
4 Sep	Fujisankei Classic	Yamanashi	110,000,000	(Japan) Masatsugu Morofuji (1)	16		
11 Sep	Toshin Golf Tournament	Mie	70,000,000	(South Korea) Lee Dong-hwan (2)	16		
18 Sep	ANA Open	Hokkaidō	110,000,000	(Australia) Kurt Barnes (1)	22		
25 Sep	Asia-Pacific Panasonic Open	Shiga	150,000,000	(Japan) Tetsuji Hiratsuka (6)	22	ASA	
2 Oct	Coca-Cola Tokai Classic	Aichi	120,000,000	(South Korea) Bae Sang-moon (2)	18		
9 Oct	Canon Open	Kanagawa	150,000,000	(Japan) Kenichi Kuboya (5)	20		
16 Oct	Japan Open Golf Championship	Chiba	200,000,000	(South Korea) Bae Sang-moon (3)	32		Flagship event (Note: Also a Japan major championship.)
23 Oct	Bridgestone Open	Chiba	150,000,000	(Japan) Toru Taniguchi (17)	22		
30 Oct	Mynavi ABC Championship	Hyōgo	150,000,000	(Japan) Koichiro Kawano (1)	22		
13 Nov	Mitsui Sumitomo Visa Taiheiyo Masters	Shizuoka	150,000,000	(Japan) Hideki Matsuyama (a) (1)	26		
20 Nov	Dunlop Phoenix Tournament	Miyazaki	200,000,000	(Japan) Toshinori Muto (4)	28		
27 Nov	Casio World Open	Kōchi	200,000,000	(Japan) Tadahiro Takayama (5)	16		
4 Dec	Golf Nippon Series JT Cup	Tokyo	130,000,000	(Japan) Hiroyuki Fujita (11)	18		Japan major

=== Unofficial events ===
The following events were sanctioned by the Japan Golf Tour, but did not carry official money, nor were wins official.

Date	Tournament	Location	Purse (¥)	Winner(s)	OWGR points	Other tours	Notes
10 Apr	Masters Tournament	United States	US$8,000,000	(South Africa) Charl Schwartzel	100		Major championship
8 May	Legend Charity Pro-Am	Chiba	25,000,000	(Japan) Kiyoshi Murota	n/a		Pro-Am
19 Jun	U.S. Open	United States	US$7,850,000	(Northern Ireland) Rory McIlroy	100		Major championship
3 Jul	Million Yard Cup	South Korea	US$200,000	Team South Korea	n/a		Team event
17 Jul	The Open Championship	England	£5,000,000	(Northern Ireland) Darren Clarke	100		Major championship
14 Aug	PGA Championship	United States	US$8,000,000	(United States) Keegan Bradley	100		Major championship
11 Dec	Hitachi 3Tours Championship	Chiba	57,000,000	LPGA of Japan Tour	n/a		Team event

== Money list ==
The money list was based on prize money won during the season, calculated in Japanese yen.

Position	Player	Prize money (¥)
1	(South Korea) Bae Sang-moon	151,078,958
2	(Japan) Tadahiro Takayama	98,718,202
3	(Japan) Ryo Ishikawa	98,282,603
4	(Japan) Toru Taniguchi	96,888,944
5	(Japan) Hiroyuki Fujita	94,355,200

== Awards ==
Award	Winner	Ref.
Most Valuable Player	(South Korea) Bae Sang-moon	
Rookie of the Year (Shimada Trophy)	(South Korea) Park Jae-bum	

== Japan Challenge Tour ==
2011 Japan Challenge Tour season
- Duration: 8 April 2011 – 21 October 2011
- Number of official events: 10
- Most wins: (Japan) Tatsunori Nukaga (2)
- Money list: (Japan) Tatsunori Nukaga

The 2011 Japan Challenge Tour was the 27th season of the Japan Challenge Tour, the official development tour to the Japan Golf Tour.

=== Schedule ===
The following table lists official events during the 2011 season.

Date	Tournament	Location	Purse (¥)	Winner (Note: The number in brackets after each winner's name is the number of Japan Challenge Tour events they had won up to and including that tournament. It is rare for someone to accumulate many wins on the Japan Challenge Tour as success at this level usually leads to promotion to the Japan Golf Tour.)
10 Apr	Novil Cup	Tokushima	15,000,000	(Japan) Tatsunori Nukaga (2)
22 Apr	Kimisarazu GL GMA Challenge Tournament	Chiba	10,000,000	(Japan) Takanobu Kondo (1)
27 May	Fuji Country Kanai Club Challenge Cup	Gifu	10,000,000	(Japan) Hidezumi Shirakata (2)
9 Jun	Boso Country Cup	Chiba	10,000,000	(Japan) Hirohito Koizumi (2)
1 Jul	Tokyu Resort Nasu JGTO Challenge	Tochigi	10,000,000	(Thailand) Chinnarat Phadungsil (1)
9 Jul	Shizu Hills Tommy Cup	Ibaraki	15,000,000	(Japan) Koichi Sugimoto (1)
22 Jul	Srixon Challenge	Hokkaido	10,000,000	(Japan) Hidemichi Haginomori (1)
16 Sep	Toshoen GC JGTO Challenge II	Tochigi	10,000,000	(Japan) Taro Hiroi (1)
22 Sep	Elite grips JGTO Challenge III	Hyōgo	10,000,000	(Japan) Yudai Maeda (2)
21 Oct	JGTO Novil Final	Chiba	10,000,000	(Japan) Tatsunori Nukaga (3)

=== Money list ===
The money list was based on prize money won during the season, calculated in Japanese yen. The top six players on the money list earned status to play on the 2012 Japan Golf Tour.

Position	Player	Prize money (¥)
1	(Japan) Tatsunori Nukaga	5,846,275
2	(Japan) Hidezumi Shirakata	3,795,466
3	(Japan) Koichi Sugimoto	3,352,733
4	(Thailand) Chinnarat Phadungsil	3,270,937
5	(Japan) Yudai Maeda	2,487,107
6	(Japan) Toru Morita	2,331,320
