= Koichiro Kawano =

Japanese professional golfer

Personal information
- Nationality: Japan
- Born: 17 March 1981 (age 45) Tokyo, Japan
- Height: 1.75 m (5 ft 9 in)
- Weight: 62 kg (137 lb; 9.8 st)

Career
- Sport: Golf
- Status: Professional
- Current tour: Japan Golf Tour
- Professional wins: 1

Number of wins by tour
- Japan Golf Tour: 1

Koichiro Kawano (河野 晃一郎, Kawano Kōichirō; born 17 March 1981) is a Japanese professional golfer.

== Career ==
Kawano plays on the Japan Golf Tour, where he has won once.

== Professional wins (1) ==
=== Japan Golf Tour wins (1) ===
No.	Date	Tournament	Winning score	Margin of victory	Runner-up
1	30 Oct 2011	Mynavi ABC Championship	−15 (68-69-69-67=273)	Playoff	(South Korea) Bae Sang-moon

Japan Golf Tour playoff record (1–1)

No.	Year	Tournament	Opponent	Result
1	2011	Mynavi ABC Championship	(South Korea) Bae Sang-moon	Won with birdie on sixth extra hole
