= Toshin Golf Tournament =

Tournament information
- Location: Tomika, Gifu, Japan
- Established: 2010
- Courses: Toshin Golf Club (Central Course)
- Par: 72
- Length: 7,004 yards (6,404 m)
- Tour: Japan Golf Tour
- Format: Stroke play
- Prize fund: ¥100,000,000
- Month played: October
- Final year: 2014

Tournament record score
- Aggregate: 260 Hur In-hoi (2014)
- To par: −28 as above

Final champion
- (South Korea) Hur In-hoi
- Location in Japan Location in the Gifu Prefecture

The Toshin Golf Tournament was a professional golf tournament on the Japan Golf Tour from 2010 to 2014. It was played at the Toshin Lake Wood Golf Club in Tsu, Mie in 2010 and 2011. It moved to the Ryosen Golf Club in Inabe, Mie in 2012 and the Toshin Golf Club, Central Course in Tomika, Gifu in 2013. The purse for the 2014 event was ¥100,000,000, with ¥20,000,000 going to the winner.

In 2012, Wu Ashun defeated Yuta Ikeda in a sudden-death playoff to become the first Chinese winner on the Japan Golf Tour.

== Tournament hosts ==
Year(s)	Host course	Location
2013–2014	Toshin Golf Club (Central Course)	Tomika, Gifu
2012	Ryosen Golf Club	Inabe, Mie
2010–2011	Toshin Lake Wood Golf Club	Tsu, Mie

== Winners ==
Year	Winner	Score	To par	Margin of victory	Runner-up
2014	(South Korea) Hur In-hoi	260	−28	4 strokes	(South Korea) Kim Seung-hyuk
2013	(Japan) Yoshinori Fujimoto	264	−24	4 strokes	(Japan) Koumei Oda
2012	(China) Wu Ashun	198 (Note: Shortened to 54 holes due to weather.)	−18	Playoff (Note: Wu won with a birdie on the fourth hole of a sudden-death playoff.)	(Japan) Yuta Ikeda
2011	(South Korea) Lee Dong-hwan	268	−20	1 stroke	(Japan) Taigen Tsumagari
2010	(Japan) Yuta Ikeda	271	−17	3 strokes	(Japan) Shunsuke Sonoda
