= Norio Shinozaki =

Japanese professional golfer

Personal information
- Nationality: Japan
- Born: 24 October 1969 (age 57) Chiba Prefecture, Japan
- Height: 1.62 m (5 ft 4 in)
- Weight: 67 kg (148 lb; 10.6 st)

Career
- Sport: Golf
- Turned professional: 1992
- Current tour: Japan PGA Senior Tour
- Former tour: Japan Golf Tour
- Professional wins: 5

Number of wins by tour
- Japan Golf Tour: 1
- Other: 4

Achievements and awards
- Japan PGA Senior Tour Order of Merit winner: 2021

Norio Shinozaki (篠崎 紀夫, Shinozaki Norio; born 24 October 1969) is a Japanese professional golfer.

== Career ==
Shinozaki plays on the Japan Golf Tour, where he has won once.

== Professional wins (5) ==
=== Japan Golf Tour wins (1) ===
No.	Date	Tournament	Winning score	Margin of victory	Runners-up
1	16 Sep 2007	ANA Open	−7 (68-70-70-69=277)	Playoff	(Japan) Yasuharu Imano, (Thailand) Chawalit Plaphol

Japan Golf Tour playoff record (1–0)

No.	Year	Tournament	Opponents	Result
1	2007	ANA Open	(Japan) Yasuharu Imano, (Thailand) Chawalit Plaphol	Won with par on fifth extra hole Imano eliminated by par on first hole

=== Japan PGA Senior Tour wins (4) ===
No.	Date	Tournament	Winning score	Margin of victory	Runner(s)-up
1	30 Aug 2020	Maruhan Cup Taiheiyo Club Senior	−9 (68-67=135)	Playoff	(Japan) Yoshinobu Tsukada
2	16 Apr 2021	Nojima Championcup Hakone Senior Tournament	−10 (68-66=134)	Playoff	(Japan) Toshimitsu Izawa, (Japan) Hirofumi Miyase
3	24 Oct 2021	ISPS Handa Great Ni Tanoshiku Omoshiroi Senior Tournament	−15 (68-69-64=201)	2 strokes	(Thailand) Prayad Marksaeng, (Japan) Daisuke Maruyama
4	31 Oct 2021	Fukuoka Senior Open	−10 (65-69=134)	1 stroke	(Japan) Kazuhiko Hosokawa
