= 2009 Japan Golf Tour =

Golf tour season

2009 Japan Golf Tour season
- Duration: 16 April 2009 – 6 December 2009
- Number of official events: 24
- Most wins: (Japan) Yuta Ikeda (4) (Japan) Ryo Ishikawa (4)
- Money list: (Japan) Ryo Ishikawa
- Most Valuable Player: (Japan) Ryo Ishikawa
- Rookie of the Year: (Japan) Yuta Ikeda

The 2009 Japan Golf Tour was the 37th season of the Japan Golf Tour (formerly the PGA of Japan Tour), the main professional golf tour in Japan since it was formed in 1973.

== Schedule ==
The following table lists official events during the 2009 season.

Date	Tournament	Location	Purse (¥)	Winner (Note: The number in brackets after each winner's name is the number of Japan Golf Tour events they had won up to and including that tournament. This information is only shown for Japan Golf Tour members.)	OWGR points	Other tours (Note: ASA − Asian Tour.)	Notes
19 Apr	Token Homemate Cup	Mie	130,000,000	(Japan) Koumei Oda (2)	16		
26 Apr	Tsuruya Open	Hyōgo	120,000,000	(Japan) Masaya Tomida (1)	18		
3 May	The Crowns	Aichi	120,000,000	(Japan) Tetsuji Hiratsuka (5)	20		
31 May	Mitsubishi Diamond Cup Golf	Ibaraki	150,000,000	(Japan) Takashi Kanemoto (1)	20		
7 Jun	UBS Japan Golf Tour Championship ShishidoHills	Ibaraki	150,000,000	(Japan) Yuji Igarashi (1)	20		Japan major
14 Jun	Japan PGA Championship	Hokkaidō	130,000,000	(Japan) Yuta Ikeda (1)	16		Japan major
28 Jun	Gateway to The Open Mizuno Open Yomiuri Classic	Hyōgo	130,000,000	(Japan) Ryo Ishikawa (3)	18		
26 Jul	Nagashima Shigeo Invitational Sega Sammy Cup	Hokkaidō	130,000,000	(Japan) Hiroyuki Fujita (7)	18		
2 Aug	Sun Chlorella Classic	Hokkaidō	150,000,000	(Japan) Ryo Ishikawa (4)	16		
23 Aug	Kansai Open Golf Championship	Hyōgo	50,000,000	(Japan) Hiroyuki Fujita (8)	16		
30 Aug	Vana H Cup KBC Augusta	Fukuoka	110,000,000	(Japan) Yuta Ikeda (2)	18		
6 Sep	Fujisankei Classic	Yamanashi	110,000,000	(Japan) Ryo Ishikawa (5)	18		
20 Sep	ANA Open	Hokkaidō	130,000,000	(Japan) Toru Taniguchi (15)	16		
27 Sep	Asia-Pacific Panasonic Open	Kyoto	150,000,000	(Japan) Daisuke Maruyama (2)	20	ASA	
4 Oct	Coca-Cola Tokai Classic	Aichi	120,000,000	(Japan) Ryo Ishikawa (6)	18		
11 Oct	Canon Open	Kanagawa	150,000,000	(Japan) Yuta Ikeda (3)	18		
18 Oct	Japan Open Golf Championship	Saitama	200,000,000	(Japan) Ryuichi Oda (1)	32		Flagship event (Note: Also a Japan major championship.)
25 Oct	Bridgestone Open	Chiba	150,000,000	(Japan) Yuta Ikeda (4)	20		
1 Nov	Mynavi ABC Championship	Hyōgo	150,000,000	(Japan) Toru Suzuki (8)	16		
8 Nov	The Championship by Lexus	Ibaraki	200,000,000	(Japan) Toshinori Muto (3)	16		
15 Nov	Mitsui Sumitomo Visa Taiheiyo Masters	Shizuoka	200,000,000	(Japan) Yasuharu Imano (7)	20		
22 Nov	Dunlop Phoenix Tournament	Miyazaki	200,000,000	(Italy) Edoardo Molinari (n/a)	28		
29 Nov	Casio World Open	Kōchi	200,000,000	(Japan) Koumei Oda (3)	22		
6 Dec	Golf Nippon Series JT Cup	Tokyo	130,000,000	(Japan) Shigeki Maruyama (10)	24		Japan major

=== Unofficial events ===
The following events were sanctioned by the Japan Golf Tour, but did not carry official money, nor were wins official.

Date	Tournament	Location	Purse (¥)	Winner(s)	OWGR points	Other tours	Notes
12 Apr	Masters Tournament	United States	US$7,500,000	(Argentina) Ángel Cabrera	100		Major championship
22 Jun	U.S. Open	United States	US$7,500,000	(United States) Lucas Glover	100		Major championship
19 Jul	The Open Championship	Scotland	£4,200,000	(United States) Stewart Cink	100		Major championship
16 Aug	PGA Championship	United States	US$7,500,000	(South Korea) Yang Yong-eun	100		Major championship
14 Sep	Hirao Masaaki Charity Golf	Chiba	18,000,000	(Japan) Kaname Yokoo	n/a		
13 Dec	Hitachi 3Tours Championship	Chiba	50,000,000	Japan PGA Senior Tour	n/a		Team event

== Money list ==
The money list was based on prize money won during the season, calculated in Japanese yen.

Position	Player	Prize money (¥)
1	(Japan) Ryo Ishikawa	183,524,051
2	(Japan) Yuta Ikeda	158,556,695
3	(Japan) Koumei Oda	118,774,176
4	(Japan) Shingo Katayama	113,678,535
5	(Japan) Hiroyuki Fujita	91,244,625

== Awards ==
Award	Winner	Ref.
Most Valuable Player	(Japan) Ryo Ishikawa	
Rookie of the Year (Shimada Trophy)	(Japan) Yuta Ikeda	

== Japan Challenge Tour ==
2009 Japan Challenge Tour season
- Duration: 10 April 2009 – 23 October 2009
- Number of official events: 11
- Most wins: (Australia) Chris Campbell (2) (Japan) Kazuhiro Kida (2) (Japan) Achi Sato (2)
- Money list: (Australia) Chris Campbell

The 2009 Japan Challenge Tour was the 25th season of the Japan Challenge Tour, the official development tour to the Japan Golf Tour.

=== Schedule ===
The following table lists official events during the 2009 season.

Date	Tournament	Location	Purse (¥)	Winner (Note: The number in brackets after each winner's name is the number of Japan Challenge Tour events they had won up to and including that tournament. It is rare for someone to accumulate many wins on the Japan Challenge Tour as success at this level usually leads to promotion to the Japan Golf Tour.)
12 Apr	Novil Cup	Tokushima	20,000,000	(Japan) Achi Sato (2)
22 May	Sashima JGTO Challenge I	Ibaraki	10,000,000	(Australia) Chris Campbell (1)
20 Jun	Shizu Hills Tommy Cup	Ibaraki	15,000,000	(Australia) Chris Campbell (2)
26 Jun	Mochizuki Tokyu JGTO Challenge II	Nagano	10,000,000	(Japan) Junpei Takayama (1)
10 Jul	Boso Country Cup	Chiba	10,000,000	(Japan) Katsumi Kubo (1)
16 Jul	Everlife Cup Challenge Tournament	Fukuoka	10,000,000	(Japan) Kazuhiro Kida (1)
11 Sep	Srixon Challenge	Fukuoka	10,000,000	(Japan) Toru Morita (1)
18 Sep	Asakura JGTO Challenge III	Chiba	10,000,000	(Japan) Kazuhiro Kida (2)
25 Sep	Toshin Challenge Tournament	Mie	10,000,000	(Japan) Yuta Kinoshita (1)
9 Oct	Sunroyal GC Cup	Hyōgo	10,000,000	(Japan) Achi Sato (3)
23 Oct	PRGR Novil Cup Final	Ibaraki	13,000,000	(Taiwan) Lu Wei-chih (1)

=== Money list ===
The money list was based on prize money won during the season, calculated in Japanese yen. The top seven players on the money list earned status to play on the 2010 Japan Golf Tour.

Position	Player	Prize money (¥)
1	(Australia) Chris Campbell	6,136,154
2	(Japan) Achi Sato	6,119,944
3	(Taiwan) Lu Wei-chih	4,890,916
4	(Japan) Kazuhiro Kida	4,491,550
5	(Japan) Kodai Ichihara	4,259,750
6	(Japan) Yoshikazu Haku	3,594,500
7	(Japan) Junpei Takayama	3,395,371
