= 2014 Japan Golf Tour =

Golf tour season

2014 Japan Golf Tour season
- Duration: 27 March 2014 – 7 December 2014
- Number of official events: 24 (Note: One further tournament was scheduled but was cancelled.)
- Most wins: (Japan) Hiroyuki Fujita (3)
- Money list: (Japan) Koumei Oda
- Most Valuable Player: (Japan) Koumei Oda
- Rookie of the Year: (South Korea) Kim Seung-hyuk

The 2014 Japan Golf Tour was the 42nd season of the Japan Golf Tour (formerly the PGA of Japan Tour), the main professional golf tour in Japan since it was formed in 1973.

== Schedule ==
The following table lists official events during the 2014 season.

Date	Tournament	Location	Purse (¥)	Winner (Note: The number in brackets after each winner's name is the number of Japan Golf Tour events they had won up to and including that tournament. This information is only shown for Japan Golf Tour members.)	OWGR points	Other tours (Note: ASA − Asian Tour; ONE − OneAsia Tour.)	Notes
~~23 Mar~~	Thailand Open	Thailand	–	Cancelled	–	ONE	
30 Mar	Enjoy Jakarta Indonesia PGA Championship	Indonesia	US$1,000,000	(Japan) Michio Matsumura (4)	12	ONE	
20 Apr	Token Homemate Cup	Mie	130,000,000	(Japan) Yūsaku Miyazato (2)	16		
27 Apr	Tsuruya Open	Hyōgo	110,000,000	(Japan) Hiroyuki Fujita (16)	16		
4 May	The Crowns	Aichi	120,000,000	(South Korea) Kim Hyung-sung (3)	16		
25 May	Kansai Open Golf Championship	Hyōgo	60,000,000	(Japan) Koumei Oda (7)	16		
1 Jun	Gateway to The Open Mizuno Open	Okayama	110,000,000	(South Korea) Jang Dong-kyu (1)	16		
8 Jun	Japan PGA Championship Nissin Cupnoodles Cup	Hyōgo	150,000,000	(Japan) Taichi Teshima (7)	16		Japan major
22 Jun	Japan Golf Tour Championship; Mori Building Cup Shishido Hills	Ibaraki	150,000,000	(Japan) Yoshitaka Takeya (1)	16		Japan major
6 Jul	Nagashima Shigeo Invitational Sega Sammy Cup	Hokkaidō	200,000,000	(Japan) Ryo Ishikawa (11)	18		
3 Aug	Dunlop Srixon Fukushima Open	Fukushima	50,000,000	(Japan) Satoshi Kodaira (2)	16		New tournament
31 Aug	RZ Everlasting KBC Augusta	Fukuoka	110,000,000	(Japan) Hiroyuki Fujita (17)	16		
7 Sep	Fujisankei Classic	Yamanashi	110,000,000	(Japan) Hiroshi Iwata (1)	16		
21 Sep	ANA Open	Hokkaidō	110,000,000	(Japan) Katsumasa Miyamoto (9)	16		
28 Sep	Asia-Pacific Diamond Cup Golf	Ibaraki	150,000,000	(Japan) Hiroyuki Fujita (18)	15	ASA	
5 Oct	Top Cup Tokai Classic	Aichi	110,000,000	(South Korea) Kim Seung-hyuk (1)	16		
12 Oct	Toshin Golf Tournament	Gifu	100,000,000	(South Korea) Hur In-hoi (1)	16		
19 Oct	Japan Open Golf Championship	Chiba	200,000,000	(Japan) Yuta Ikeda (12)	32		Flagship event (Note: Also a Japan major championship.)
26 Oct	Bridgestone Open	Chiba	150,000,000	(Japan) Koumei Oda (8)	16		
2 Nov	Mynavi ABC Championship	Hyōgo	150,000,000	(Japan) Ryuichi Oda (2)	16		
9 Nov	Heiwa PGM Championship	Ibaraki	200,000,000	(Japan) Tomohiro Kondo (6)	16		
16 Nov	Mitsui Sumitomo Visa Taiheiyo Masters	Shizuoka	150,000,000	(United States) David Oh (1)	24		
23 Nov	Dunlop Phoenix Tournament	Miyazaki	200,000,000	(Japan) Hideki Matsuyama (6)	26		
30 Nov	Casio World Open	Kōchi	200,000,000	(Japan) Shingo Katayama (28)	16		
7 Dec	Golf Nippon Series JT Cup	Tokyo	130,000,000	(Japan) Katsumasa Miyamoto (10)	17		Japan major

=== Unofficial events ===
The following events were sanctioned by the Japan Golf Tour, but did not carry official money, nor were wins official.

Date	Tournament	Location	Purse (¥)	Winner(s)	OWGR points	Other tours	Notes
13 Apr	Masters Tournament	United States	US$9,000,000	(United States) Bubba Watson	100		Major championship
18 May	Legend Charity Pro-Am	Chiba	50,000,000	(Japan) Masahiro Kuramoto	n/a		Pro-Am
15 Jun	U.S. Open	United States	US$9,000,000	(Germany) Martin Kaymer	100		Major championship
20 Jul	The Open Championship	England	£5,400,000	(Northern Ireland) Rory McIlroy	100		Major championship
10 Aug	PGA Championship	United States	US$10,000,000	(Northern Ireland) Rory McIlroy	100		Major championship
14 Dec	Hitachi 3Tours Championship	Chiba	57,000,000	LPGA of Japan Tour	n/a		Team event

== Money list ==
The money list was based on prize money won during the season, calculated in Japanese yen.

Position	Player	Prize money (¥)
1	(Japan) Koumei Oda	137,318,693
2	(Japan) Hiroyuki Fujita	116,275,130
3	(Japan) Tomohiro Kondo	107,089,056
4	(Japan) Hiroshi Iwata	97,794,191
5	(Japan) Katsumasa Miyamoto	91,048,150

== Awards ==
Award	Winner	Ref.
Most Valuable Player	(Japan) Koumei Oda	
Rookie of the Year (Shimada Trophy)	(South Korea) Kim Seung-hyuk	

== Japan Challenge Tour ==
2014 Japan Challenge Tour season
- Duration: 4 April 2014 – 24 October 2014
- Number of official events: 16
- Most wins: (Japan) Shugo Imahira (2) (Japan) Toru Suzuki (2) (Australia) Peter Wilson (2)
- Money list: (Japan) Shugo Imahira

The 2014 Japan Challenge Tour was the 30th season of the Japan Challenge Tour, the official development tour to the Japan Golf Tour.

=== Schedule ===
The following table lists official events during the 2014 season.

Date	Tournament	Location	Purse (¥)	Winner (Note: The number in brackets after each winner's name is the number of Japan Challenge Tour events they had won up to and including that tournament. It is rare for someone to accumulate many wins on the Japan Challenge Tour as success at this level usually leads to promotion to the Japan Golf Tour.)
6 Apr	Novil Cup	Tokushima	15,000,000	(Japan) Soushi Tajima (2)
9 May	Plus One Fukuoka Raizan Challenge	Fukuoka	10,000,000	(Australia) Peter Wilson (1)
23 May	Heiwa PGM Challenge I Road to Championship	Hyōgo	10,000,000	(Japan) Shugo Imahira (1)
13 Jun	Fuji Country Kani Club Challenge Cup	Gifu	10,000,000	(Japan) Toru Suzuki (2)
27 Jun	Landic Golf Tournament Associa Mansion Memorial	Fukuoka	10,000,000	(Japan) Shintaro Kai (1)
10 Jul	ISPS Charity Challenge Tournament	Shizuoka	15,000,000	(Japan) Shota Akiyoshi (1)
25 Jul	Heiwa PGM Challenge II Road to Championship	Niigata	10,000,000	(Japan) Kiyoshi Miyazato (1)
1 Aug	Akita TV Minami Akita CC Challenge	Akita	10,000,000	(Japan) Yasunobu Fukunaga (1)
22 Aug	PGA JGTO Challenge Cup	Chiba	13,000,000	(Japan) Taigen Tsumagari (1)
5 Sep	Madame Shinco Challenge Tournament	Hyōgo	10,000,000	(Australia) Peter Wilson (2)
12 Sep	Himawari Dragon Cup	Chiba	10,000,000	(Japan) Toru Suzuki (3)
19 Sep	Seven Dreamers Challenge	Chiba	10,000,000	(Japan) Yuki Inamori (1)
26 Sep	Elite Grips Challenge	Mie	10,000,000	(Japan) Yuichiro Nishi (1)
4 Oct	Ishikawa Ryo Everyone Project Challenge	Tochigi	15,000,000	(Japan) Katsufumi Okino (1)
10 Oct	Taiheiyo Club Challenge Tournament	Ibaraki	10,000,000	(United States) Richard Hattori (1)
24 Oct	JGTO Novil Final	Chiba	10,000,000	(Japan) Shugo Imahira (2)

=== Money list ===
The money list was based on prize money won during the season, calculated in Japanese yen. The top nine players on the money list earned status to play on the 2015 Japan Golf Tour.

Position	Player	Prize money (¥)
1	(Japan) Shugo Imahira	7,444,288
2	(Japan) Shintaro Kai	5,456,058
3	(Australia) Peter Wilson	4,796,324
4	(Japan) Katsufumi Okino	4,701,020
5	(Japan) Toru Suzuki	4,215,230
6	(Japan) Taigen Tsumagari	3,794,109
7	(Japan) Ryuji Masaoka	3,457,367
8	(Japan) Kiyoshi Miyazato	3,311,153
9	(Japan) Shota Akiyoshi	3,254,083
