= Masatsugu Morofuji =

Japanese professional golfer

Masatsugu Morofuji 諸藤 将次
Personal information
- Nationality: Japan
- Born: 1 August 1985 (age 41) Fukuoka Prefecture, Japan
- Height: 1.80 m (5 ft 11 in)
- Weight: 65 kg (143 lb; 10.2 st)

Career
- Sport: Golf
- Status: Professional
- Current tour: Japan Golf Tour
- Professional wins: 1

Number of wins by tour
- Japan Golf Tour: 1

Masatsugu Morofuji (諸藤 将次, Morofuji Masatsugu; born 1 August 1985) is a Japanese professional golfer.

== Career ==
Morofuji plays on the Japan Golf Tour, where he has won once.

== Professional wins (1) ==
=== Japan Golf Tour wins (1) ===
No.	Date	Tournament	Winning score	Margin of victory	Runner-up
1	4 Sep 2011	Fujisankei Classic	−6 (67-69=136) (Note: Shortened to 36 holes due to weather.)	3 strokes	(Singapore) Mardan Mamat
