= Ryuichi Oda =

Japanese professional golfer

Ryuichi Oda 小田龍一
Personal information
- Nationality: Japan
- Born: 12 December 1976 (age 49) Kagoshima Prefecture, Japan
- Height: 1.80 m (5 ft 11 in)
- Weight: 90 kg (200 lb; 14 st)

Career
- Sport: Golf
- Turned professional: 2002
- Current tour: Japan Golf Tour
- Professional wins: 3

Number of wins by tour
- Japan Golf Tour: 2
- Other: 1

Best results in major championships
- Masters Tournament: DNP
- PGA Championship: DNP
- U.S. Open: DNP
- The Open Championship: CUT: 2010

Ryuichi Oda (Japanese: 小田龍一, born 12 December 1976) is a Japanese professional golfer who currently competes on the Japan Golf Tour.

== Career ==
Oda was born in Kagoshima Prefecture. He spent much of his amateur career developing his skills at the Kagoshima Country Club. He competed in two Japan Golf Tour events in 2002 (Token Corporation Cup and Tsuruya Open) and despite missing the cut on both occasions, became a professional in time for the Fujisankei Classic where he once again failed to get past the second day. It was not until the Diamond Cup Tournament before he made his first cut, finishing T55.

It was not until the 2009 Japan Open that Oda shot to fame. He only just avoided being cut after two rounds and by round three was tied for 5th place. He went on to beat Ryo Ishikawa and Yasuharu Imano in a three-man playoff. Oda would win on the Japan Golf Tour again in 2014, when he took victory at the Mynavi ABC Championship. He would win handily by 5 strokes over Koumei Oda and Hideto Tanihara.

== Professional wins (3) ==
=== Japan Golf Tour wins (2) ===
Legend
Flagship events (1)
Japan majors (1) (Note: The 2009 Japan Open Golf Championship was also a Japan major championship.)
Other Japan Golf Tour (1)

No.	Date	Tournament	Winning score	Margin of victory	Runners-up
1	18 Oct 2009	Japan Open Golf Championship	−6 (74-70-71-67=282)	Playoff	(Japan) Yasuharu Imano, (Japan) Ryo Ishikawa
2	2 Nov 2014	Mynavi ABC Championship	−21 (68-67-66-62=263)	5 strokes	(Japan) Koumei Oda, (Japan) Hideto Tanihara

Japan Golf Tour playoff record (1–0)

No.	Year	Tournament	Opponents	Result
1	2009	Japan Open Golf Championship	(Japan) Yasuharu Imano, (Japan) Ryo Ishikawa	Won with birdie on second extra hole

=== Other wins (1) ===
- 2016 Kyusyu Open

== Results in major championships ==
Tournament	2010
The Open Championship	CUT

Note: Oda only played in The Open Championship.
CUT = missed the half-way cut
