= Yuji Igarashi =

Japanese golfer

Yugi Igarashi 五十嵐雄二
Personal information
- Nationality: Japan
- Born: 28 August 1968 (age 58) Saitama Prefecture, Japan
- Height: 1.70 m (5 ft 7 in)
- Weight: 72 kg (159 lb; 11.3 st)

Career
- Sport: Golf
- Status: Professional
- Current tour: Japan Golf Tour
- Professional wins: 1

Number of wins by tour
- Japan Golf Tour: 1

Yuji Igarashi (五十嵐 雄二, Igarashi Yūji; born 28 August 1968) is a Japanese professional golfer.

== Career ==
Igarashi was born in Saitama Prefecture. He currently plays on the Japan Golf Tour where he has won once in 2009 at the UBS Japan Golf Tour Championship ShishidoHills.

== Professional wins (1) ==
=== Japan Golf Tour wins (1) ===
Legend
Japan majors (1)
Other Japan Golf Tour (0)

No.	Date	Tournament	Winning score	Margin of victory	Runners-up
1	7 Jun 2009	UBS Japan Golf Tour Championship ShishidoHills	−8 (67-67-72-70=276)	1 stroke	(South Korea) Jang Ik-jae, (New Zealand) David Smail, (Japan) Toru Suzuki

Japan Golf Tour playoff record (0–1)

No.	Year	Tournament	Opponents	Result
1	2001	Diamond Cup Tournament	(Japan) Hiroyuki Fujita, (Japan) Toshimitsu Izawa	Izawa won with par on first extra hole

== Results in World Golf Championships ==
Tournament	2009
Match Play	
Championship	
Invitational	78
Champions	

Did not play
