= Ryo Ishikawa =

Japanese golfer (born 1991)

Ryo Ishikawa 石川 遼
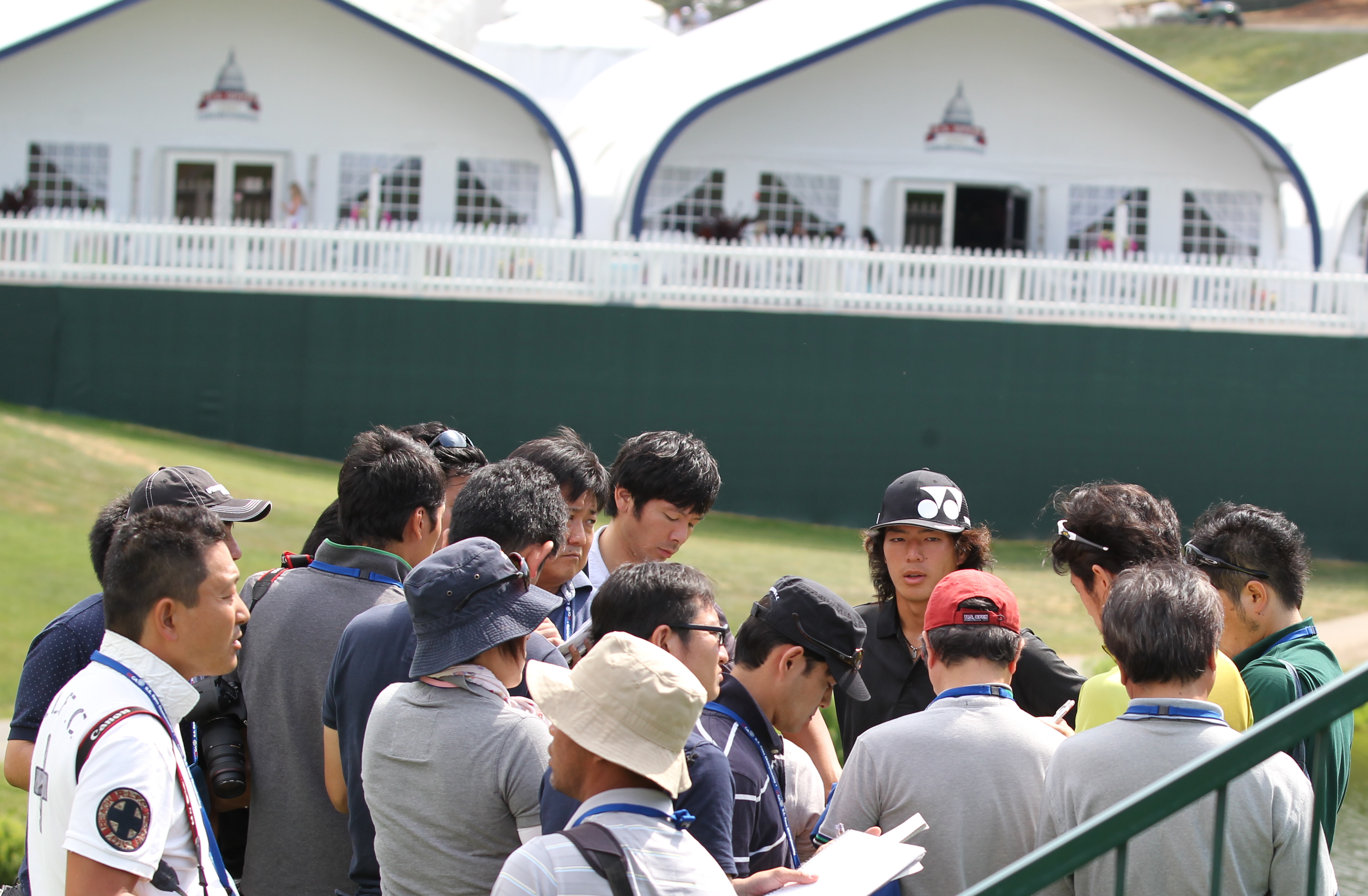

Personal information
- Nickname: Hanikami Ōji
- Nationality: Japan
- Born: 17 September 1991 (age 35) Matsubushi, Saitama, Japan
- Height: 1.75 m (5 ft 9 in)
- Weight: 72 kg (159 lb)

Career
- Sport: Golf
- Turned professional: 2008
- Current tours: Japan Golf Tour; Korn Ferry Tour
- Former tour: PGA Tour
- Professional wins: 21
- Highest ranking: 29 (29 November 2009)

Number of wins by tour
- Japan Golf Tour: 20 (Tied-9th all-time)
- Other: 1

Best results in major championships
- Masters Tournament: T20: 2011
- PGA Championship: T29: 2013
- U.S. Open: T30: 2011
- The Open Championship: T27: 2010

Achievements and awards
- Japan Golf Tour Rookie of the Year: 2008
- Japan Golf Tour money list winner: 2009
- Japan Golf Tour Most Valuable Player: 2009

Ryo Ishikawa (石川 遼, Ishikawa Ryō; born 17 September 1991), also known by the nickname Hanikami Ōji (ハニカミ王子; literally, "Bashful Prince"), is a Japanese professional golfer.

== Amateur career ==
On 20 May 2007, Ishikawa became the youngest winner ever of a men's regular tournament on the Japan Golf Tour by winning the Munsingwear Open KSB Cup at the age 15 years and 8 months. The Munsingwear Open was his first tour event; he participated as an amateur. He finished one shot ahead of the ninth top-ranked player in Japan at the time, Katsumasa Miyamoto. The highest ranked player on the Official World Golf Ranking who took part in the event was Toru Taniguchi, who finished tied for thirteenth, six shots shy of Ishikawa. Taniguchi ranked number 86 in the world after the event.

== Professional career ==
Ishikawa turned professional in 2008 and won another Japan Golf Tour tournament, the mynavi ABC Championship. By the close of 2008, he had become the youngest player ever to reach the top 100 of the Official World Golf Rankings.

Ishikawa played in PGA Tour tournaments for the first time in 2009. He was cut from the Northern Trust Open, the Arnold Palmer Invitational and the 2009 Masters Tournament. He finished 71st at the Transitions Championship.

On 28 June 2009, Ishikawa won the Gateway to the Open Mizuno Open Yomiuri Classic on the Japan Golf Tour to qualify for the 2009 Open Championship, the first major event for which he qualified without receiving a special exemption.

With four wins on the Japan Golf Tour in 2009, in September, Ishikawa became the youngest golfer ever to reach the top 50 of the Official World Golf Rankings.

Ishikawa dominated the Japan Golf Tour for much of the 2009 season and was the top-ranked Japanese player in the World Rankings. On 18 October, he tied for second at the Japan Open, losing to Ryuichi Oda on the second hole of a playoff. He finished the season as the money list leader on the Japan Golf Tour with ¥183.52 million.

At the Japan GTO awards, held in December 2009, Ishikawa earned 9 titles. In addition to top money earner, he was named MVP, best scoring average (69.93), best putting average (1.724), highest birdie haul (4.42), etc.

On 2 May 2010, in the final round of The Crowns, he shot a 12-under-par 58 to win the tournament by five strokes. The 58 was the lowest score ever carded in a Japan Golf Tour event, eclipsing a 59 achieved in the first round of 2003 Acom International by Masahiro Kuramoto, and lowest ever on any major golf tour. His round consisted of 12 birdies and six pars. However, because the course was a par-70 (versus the par-72 courses where some players shot 59), the record is not the lowest in relation to par.

Ishikawa caught the attention of American golf fans at the 2010 U.S. Open. Wearing a bright bubblegum pink outfit, he played under par on the first day and was tied for second after the second day before falling back over the weekend.

On 30 March 2011 Ishikawa announced that he would be donating all of his 2011 tour earnings, plus an additional ¥100,000 for every birdie he made during the year, to the Japan earthquake relief efforts.

On 11 March 2012, the one-year anniversary of the Japan earthquake, Ishikawa finished runner-up to George McNeill in the Puerto Rico Open, his highest PGA Tour finish thus far. Just over a week later, Ishikawa became a member of the PGA Tour. The second-place finish earned Special Temporary Membership by exceeding $411,943, or 150th on the PGA Tour's 2011 money list.

Ishikawa played on the PGA Tour in 2013. He made 13 cuts in 23 events, finishing 149th on the money list and missing the FedEx Cup playoffs (ranked 141st). He played the Web.com Tour Finals and finished 13th to retain his PGA Tour card for 2014.

Ishikawa had nine top-25s and made 14 cuts during the 2014 season, including a second-place finish at the Shriners Hospitals for Children Open and a tie for fifth at the unofficial ISPS Handa World Cup of Golf.

== Professional wins (21) ==
=== Japan Golf Tour wins (20) ===
Legend
Japan majors (3)
Other Japan Golf Tour (17)

No.	Date	Tournament	Winning score	Margin of victory	Runner(s)-up
1	23 May 2007	Munsingwear Open KSB Cup (as an amateur)	−12 (72-69-69-66=276)	1 stroke	(Japan) Katsumasa Miyamoto
2	2 Nov 2008	Mynavi ABC Championship	−9 (70-70-70-69=279)	1 stroke	(Japan) Keiichiro Fukabori
3	28 Jun 2009	Gateway to The Open Mizuno Open Yomiuri Classic	−13 (69-65-68-73=275)	3 strokes	(New Zealand) David Smail
4	2 Aug 2009	Sun Chlorella Classic	−17 (65-68-71-67=271)	1 stroke	(Australia) Brendan Jones
5	6 Sep 2009	Fujisankei Classic	−12 (69-65-68-70=272)	5 strokes	(Japan) Daisuke Maruyama
6	4 Oct 2009	Coca-Cola Tokai Classic	−14 (71-68-66-69=274)	1 stroke	(Japan) Takeshi Kajikawa
7	2 May 2010	The Crowns	−13 (68-70-71-58=267)	5 strokes	(Japan) Hiroyuki Fujita, (Australia) Paul Sheehan
8	5 Sep 2010	Fujisankei Classic (2)	−9 (66-71-68-70=275)	Playoff	(Japan) Shunsuke Sonoda
9	13 Nov 2010	Mitsui Sumitomo Visa Taiheiyo Masters	−14 (70-72-65-67=274)	2 strokes	(Australia) Brendan Jones
10	11 Nov 2012	Mitsui Sumitomo Visa Taiheiyo Masters (2)	−15 (67-69-69-68=273)	1 stroke	(Japan) Michio Matsumura
11	6 Jul 2014	Nagashima Shigeo Invitational Sega Sammy Cup	−10 (69-71-67-67=274)	Playoff	(Japan) Koumei Oda
12	20 Sep 2015	ANA Open	−16 (68-68-67-69=272)	2 strokes	(Japan) Yūsaku Miyazato
13	6 Dec 2015	Golf Nippon Series JT Cup	−14 (68-68-63-67=266)	5 strokes	(Japan) Yoshinori Fujimoto, (Japan) Koumei Oda
14	28 Aug 2016	RIZAP KBC Augusta	−15 (66-68-70-69=273)	5 strokes	(New Zealand) Michael Hendry, (Australia) Brad Kennedy, (Japan) Tadahiro Takayama
15	7 Jul 2019	Japan PGA Championship	−13 (65-67-71-66=269)	Playoff	(South Korea) Hwang Jung-gon
16	25 Aug 2019	Shigeo Nagashima Invitational Sega Sammy Cup (2)	−20 (67-66-67-68=268)	4 strokes	(Philippines) Juvic Pagunsan
17	8 Dec 2019	Golf Nippon Series JT Cup (2)	−8 (68-70-68-66=272)	Playoff	(Australia) Brad Kennedy
18	13 Nov 2022	Mitsui Sumitomo Visa Taiheiyo Masters (3)	−8 (68-66-69-69=272)	Playoff	(Japan) Rikuya Hoshino
19	23 Jun 2024	Japan Players Championship	−21 (66-64-69-68=267)	1 stroke	(Japan) Kota Kaneko
20	10 Nov 2024	Mitsui Sumitomo Visa Taiheiyo Masters (4)	−11 (66-71-65-67=269)	1 stroke	(Japan) Riki Kawamoto, (Japan) Hideto Tanihara

Japan Golf Tour playoff record (5–6)

No.	Year	Tournament	Opponent(s)	Result
1	2009	Japan Open Golf Championship	(Japan) Yasuharu Imano, (Japan) Ryuichi Oda	Oda won with birdie on second extra hole
2	2010	Fujisankei Classic	(Japan) Shunsuke Sonoda	Won with par on fourth extra hole
3	2011	Totoumi Hamamatsu Open	(Japan) Masanori Kobayashi	Lost to birdie on second extra hole
4	2014	Nagashima Shigeo Invitational Sega Sammy Cup	(Japan) Koumei Oda	Won with birdie on third extra hole
5	2018	Golf Nippon Series JT Cup	(South Korea) Hwang Jung-gon, (Japan) Satoshi Kodaira	Kodaira won with birdie on first extra hole
6	2019	Japan PGA Championship	(South Korea) Hwang Jung-gon	Won with eagle on first extra hole
7	2019	Golf Nippon Series JT Cup	(Australia) Brad Kennedy	Won with birdie on third extra hole
8	2022	ANA Open	(Japan) Tomoharu Otsuki	Lost to eagle on first extra hole
9	2022	Mitsui Sumitomo Visa Taiheiyo Masters	(Japan) Rikuya Hoshino	Won with birdie on second extra hole
10	2024	BMW Japan Golf Tour Championship Mori Building Cup	(Japan) Hiroshi Iwata	Lost to par on first extra hole
11	2025	ANA Open	(Japan) Takumi Kanaya	Lost to par on second extra hole

=== Other wins (1) ===
- 2008 Kansai Open

== Results in major championships ==
Results not in chronological order in 2020.

Tournament	2009	2010	2011	2012	2013	2014	2015	2016	2017	2018
Masters Tournament	CUT	CUT	T20	CUT	T38					
U.S. Open		T33	T30	CUT			CUT			
The Open Championship	CUT	T27	CUT	CUT		CUT				
PGA Championship	T56	CUT	CUT	T59	T29	CUT				

Tournament	2019	2020	2021	2022	2023	2024
Masters Tournament						
PGA Championship		CUT				
U.S. Open		T51	CUT		63	CUT
The Open Championship		NT				

Did not play

CUT = missed the half-way cut
"T" = tied
NT = no tournament due to COVID-19 pandemic

=== Summary ===
Tournament	Wins	2nd	3rd	Top-5	Top-10	Top-25	Events	Cuts made
Masters Tournament	0	0	0	0	0	1	5	2
PGA Championship	0	0	0	0	0	0	7	3
U.S. Open	0	0	0	0	0	0	8	4
The Open Championship	0	0	0	0	0	0	5	1
Totals	0	0	0	0	0	1	25	10

- Most consecutive cuts made – 3 (2012 PGA – 2013 PGA)
- Longest streak of top-10s – 0

== Results in The Players Championship ==
Tournament	2015
The Players Championship	T8

Top 10

"T" indicates a tie for a place

== Results in World Golf Championships ==
Results not in chronological order before 2015.

Tournament	2009	2010	2011	2012	2013	2014	2015	2016	2017	2018	2019	2020
Championship			T42									68
Match Play		R16	R64	R32								NT^{1}
Invitational		T53	T4	T50								
Champions	T17	T41			T66						T67	NT^{1}

^{1}Cancelled due to COVID-19 pandemic

Top 10
Did not play

QF, R16, R32, R64 = Round in which player lost in match play
NT = no tournament
"T" = tied

== Team appearances ==
Professional

- Royal Trophy (representing Asia): 2009 (winners), 2010, 2011, 2012 (winners), 2013
- Presidents Cup (International team): 2009, 2011
- World Cup (representing Japan): 2013, 2016

== See also ==
- 2013 Web.com Tour Finals graduates
- List of golfers with most Japan Golf Tour wins
- Lowest rounds of golf
