= Satoru Hirota =

Japanese golfer

Personal information
- Nationality: Japan
- Born: 9 June 1973 (age 53) Yamaguchi Prefecture, Japan
- Height: 1.77 m (5 ft 10 in)
- Weight: 72 kg (159 lb; 11.3 st)

Career
- Sport: Golf
- Status: Professional
- Current tour: Japan Golf Tour
- Professional wins: 3

Number of wins by tour
- Japan Golf Tour: 1
- Other: 2

Satoru Hirota (born 9 June 1973) is a Japanese professional golfer.

== Career ==
Hirota plays on the Japan Golf Tour, where he has won once.

== Professional wins (3) ==
=== Japan Golf Tour wins (1) ===
No.	Date	Tournament	Winning score	Margin of victory	Runners-up
1	19 Jun 2005	Mandom Lucido Yomiuri Open	−18 (66-68-69-67=270)	1 stroke	(Japan) Shinichi Akiba, (Japan) Tetsuji Hiratsuka

Japan Golf Tour playoff record (0–1)

No.	Year	Tournament	Opponents	Result
1	2010	Token Homemate Cup	(Japan) Daisuke Maruyama, (Japan) Koumei Oda	Oda won with birdie on fourth extra hole Hirota eliminated by par on second hole

=== Japan Challenge Tour wins (1) ===
No.	Date	Tournament	Winning score	Margin of victory	Runner-up
1	14 Jun 2002	Aiful Challenge Cup Spring	−12 (66-66=132)	2 strokes	(Japan) Mitsuhiro Tateyama

=== Other wins (1) ===
- 2013 Chushikoku Open
