= Yasuharu Imano =

Japanese golfer

Yasuharu Imano 今野康晴
Personal information
- Nationality: Japan
- Born: 28 May 1973 (age 53) Gifu Prefecture, Japan
- Height: 1.75 m (5 ft 9 in)
- Weight: 75 kg (165 lb; 11.8 st)

Career
- Sport: Golf
- Turned professional: 1996
- Current tour: Japan Golf Tour
- Professional wins: 9
- Highest ranking: 75 (27 December 2009)

Number of wins by tour
- Japan Golf Tour: 7
- Other: 2

Best results in major championships
- Masters Tournament: DNP
- PGA Championship: DNP
- U.S. Open: DNP
- The Open Championship: CUT: 2000, 2006

Yasuharu Imano (Japanese: 今野康晴, born 28 May 1973) is a Japanese professional golfer.

== Career ==
Imano was born in Gifu Prefecture.

He currently plays on the Japan Golf Tour where he has won seven times between 1999 and 2009.

== Professional wins (9) ==
=== Japan Golf Tour wins (7) ===
Legend
Japan majors (1)
Other Japan Golf Tour (6)

No.	Date	Tournament	Winning score	Margin of victory	Runner(s)-up
1	2 May 1999	The Crowns	−9 (73-68-65-65=271)	1 stroke	(Japan) Naomichi Ozaki
2	25 Jun 2000	Gateway to The Open Mizuno Open	−14 (66-71-72-65=274)	1 stroke	(Japan) Toshimitsu Izawa, (Japan) Katsumasa Miyamoto
3	28 Jul 2002	Sato Foods NST Niigata Open Golf Championship	−18 (70-64-70-66=270)	4 strokes	(Japan) Katsumasa Miyamoto
4	4 Aug 2002	Aiful Cup	−20 (64-66-66-72=268)	1 stroke	(Japan) Toshimitsu Izawa
5	11 Sep 2005	Suntory Open	−13 (65-64-70-68=267)	2 strokes	(Japan) Mamo Osanai
6	4 Dec 2005	Golf Nippon Series JT Cup	−11 (72-67-63-67=269)	2 strokes	(Japan) Shinichi Yokota
7	15 Nov 2009	Mitsui Sumitomo Visa Taiheiyo Masters	−13 (69-65-68-73=275)	2 strokes	(Japan) Kenichi Kuboya, (United States) Han Lee

Japan Golf Tour playoff record (0–6)

No.	Year	Tournament	Opponent(s)	Result
1	2005	Japan Golf Tour Championship Shishido Hills Cup	(Japan) Kazuhiko Hosokawa, (New Zealand) David Smail	Hosokawa won with par on second extra hole
2	2005	ANA Open	(Japan) Keiichiro Fukabori	Lost to birdie on first extra hole
3	2007	ANA Open	(Thailand) Chawalit Plaphol, (Japan) Norio Shinozaki	Shinozaki won with par on fifth extra hole Imano eliminated by par on first hole
4	2008	Mitsui Sumitomo Visa Taiheiyo Masters	(Japan) Shingo Katayama	Lost to birdie on first extra hole
5	2009	Vana H Cup KBC Augusta	(Japan) Yuta Ikeda	Lost to birdie on second extra hole
6	2009	Japan Open Golf Championship	(Japan) Ryo Ishikawa, (Japan) Ryuichi Oda	Oda won with birdie on second extra hole

=== Asia Golf Circuit wins (1) ===
No.	Date	Tournament	Winning score	Margin of victory	Runners-up
1	23 Feb 1997	Konica U-Bix Manila Open	−7 (70-74-71-71=281)	2 strokes	(Paraguay) Pedro Martínez, (United States) Kevin Wentworth, (Philippines) Danny Zarate

=== Other wins (1) ===
- 2005 Hitachi 3Tours Championship

== Results in major championships ==
Tournament	2000	2001	2002	2003	2004	2005	2006
The Open Championship	CUT						CUT

Did not play

CUT = missed the halfway cut
Note: Imano only played in The Open Championship.

== Results in World Golf Championships ==
Tournament	2005
Match Play	
Championship	T25
Invitational	

Did not play

"T" = Tied

== Team appearances ==
- World Cup (representing Japan): 1998, 2005
- Dynasty Cup (representing Japan): 2003
- Royal Trophy (representing Asia): 2006
