= Song Young-han =

South Korean golfer

Personal information
- Nationality: South Korea
- Born: 12 July 1991 (age 35) Daegu, South Korea
- Height: 1.79 m (5 ft 10 in)
- Weight: 71 kg (157 lb; 11.2 st)

Career
- Sport: Golf
- Turned professional: 2011
- Current tours: Japan Golf Tour; LIV Golf
- Former tours: Korean Tour; OneAsia Tour
- Professional wins: 2
- Highest ranking: 69 (22 January 2017)

Number of wins by tour
- Japan Golf Tour: 2
- Asian Tour: 1

Best results in major championships
- Masters Tournament: DNP
- PGA Championship: T56: 2016
- U.S. Open: DNP
- The Open Championship: T62: 2017

Achievements and awards
- Korean Tour Rookie of the Year: 2013
- Japan Golf Tour Rookie of the Year: 2015

Song Young-han (Korean: 송영한; born 12 July 1991), also known as Younghan Song, is a South Korean professional golfer.

Song plays on the Korean Tour and the Japan Golf Tour. On the Korean Tour he has three runner-up finishes and finished 11th on the 2013 money list. On the Japan Golf Tour, he had three runner-up finishes before winning the first tournament of the 2016 season, the SMBC Singapore Open. He finished 15th on the money list in 2015.

Song also played on the OneAsia Tour from 2012 to 2014 and finished 8th on the Order of Merit in 2013.

== Professional wins (2) ==
=== Japan Golf Tour wins (2) ===
No.	Date	Tournament	Winning score	Margin of victory	Runner-up
1	31 Jan 2016	SMBC Singapore Open^{1}	−12 (70-63-69-70=272)	1 stroke	(United States) Jordan Spieth
2	27 Aug 2023	Sansan KBC Augusta	−17 (68-64-70-69=271)	1 stroke	(Japan) Ryutaro Nagano

^{1}Co-sanctioned by the Asian Tour

Japan Golf Tour playoff record (0–3)

No.	Year	Tournament	Opponent	Result
1	2016	Honma TourWorld Cup	(Japan) Yuta Ikeda	Lost to birdie on first extra hole
2	2023	ACN Championship	(Japan) Yuki Inamori	Lost to par on first extra hole
3	2026	Maezawa Cup	(Japan) Ren Yonezawa	Lost to birdie on first extra hole

== Results in major championships ==
Tournament	2016	2017	2018
Masters Tournament			
U.S. Open			
The Open Championship		T62	
PGA Championship	T56	CUT	

Tournament	2019	2020	2021	2022	2023	2024	2025
Masters Tournament							
PGA Championship							
U.S. Open							
The Open Championship		NT				T72	CUT

Did not play

CUT = missed the half-way cut
"T" = tied
NT = no tournament due to COVID-19 pandemic

== Results in World Golf Championships ==
Tournament	2016
Championship	
Match Play	
Invitational	T21
Champions	T52

Did not play

"T" = Tied
