= Hiroyuki Fujita =

Japanese golfer (born 1969)

Hiroyuki Fujita 藤田寛之
Personal information
- Nationality: Japan
- Born: 16 June 1969 (age 57) Higashi-ku, Japan
- Height: 1.68 m (5 ft 6 in)
- Weight: 70 kg (154 lb; 11 st 0 lb)

Career
- Sport: Golf
- Turned professional: 1992
- Current tour: Japan PGA Senior Tour
- Former tours: Japan Golf Tour; PGA Tour Champions
- Professional wins: 21
- Highest ranking: 43 (2 December 2012)

Number of wins by tour
- Japan Golf Tour: 18
- Asian Tour: 3
- Other: 5

Best results in major championships
- Masters Tournament: CUT: 2011, 2013
- PGA Championship: T56: 2009
- U.S. Open: T51: 2012
- The Open Championship: T41: 2005

Achievements and awards
- Japan Golf Tour Most Valuable Player: 2010, 2012
- Japan Golf Tour money list winner: 2012

Hiroyuki Fujita (Japanese: 藤田寛之, born 16 June 1969) is a Japanese professional golfer.

== Career ==
Fujita has won 18 tournaments on the Japan Golf Tour and has featured in the top 50 of the Official World Golf Ranking, reaching a height of 43rd and finishing in 48th position of the 2010 year-end ranking. In 2012, Fujita won four tournaments on the Japan Golf Tour, including the season-ending Golf Nippon Series JT Cup. He went on to finish the season as the leading money winner, as well as being voted the most valuable player.

== Professional wins (23) ==
=== Japan Golf Tour wins (18) ===
Legend
Japan majors (3)
Other Japan Golf Tour (15)

No.	Date	Tournament	Winning score	Margin of victory	Runner(s)-up
1	14 Sep 1997	Suntory Open	−14 (68-68-66-72=274)	3 strokes	(Japan) Masashi Ozaki
2	5 Aug 2001	Sun Chlorella Classic	−5 (71-73-71-68=283)	Playoff	(Japan) Katsuyoshi Tomori
3	22 Dec 2002 (2003 season)	Asia Japan Okinawa Open^{1}	−14 (67-68-67=202)*	3 strokes	(Japan) Yūsaku Miyazato (a), (United States) Ted Purdy
4	28 Mar 2004	Token Homemate Cup	−3 (70-68-74-69=281)	2 strokes	(Japan) Shingo Katayama, (South Korea) Charlie Wi
5	22 May 2005	Munsingwear Open KSB Cup	−18 (63-66-72-69=270)	3 strokes	(Australia) Steven Conran, (Japan) Tadahiro Takayama
6	11 May 2008	Pine Valley Beijing Open^{1}	−12 (67-65-72-72=276)	3 strokes	(Japan) Shintaro Kai
7	26 Jul 2009	Nagashima Shigeo Invitational Sega Sammy Cup	−16 (69-68-69-66=272)	1 stroke	(Japan) Kōki Idoki
8	23 Aug 2009	Kansai Open Golf Championship	−20 (69-66-61-68=264)	2 strokes	(Japan) Tetsuji Hiratsuka, (Japan) Tomohiro Kondo
9	25 April 2010	Tsuruya Open	−14 (66-66-67=199)*	Playoff	(Japan) Toru Taniguchi
10	5 Dec 2010	Golf Nippon Series JT Cup	−15 (65-70-64-66=265)	1 stroke	(Japan) Toru Taniguchi
11	4 Dec 2011	Golf Nippon Series JT Cup (2)	−10 (66-70-64=200)*	Playoff	(Japan) Toru Taniguchi
12	22 Apr 2012	Tsuruya Open (2)	−15 (68-66-68-67=269)	4 strokes	(South Korea) Lee Kyoung-hoon
13	27 May 2012	Diamond Cup Golf	−14 (66-65-70-73=274)	3 strokes	(Thailand) Kiradech Aphibarnrat
14	16 Sep 2012	ANA Open	−16 (71-68-65-68=272)	1 stroke	(Australia) Kurt Barnes, (Japan) Yuta Ikeda, (South Korea) Kim Hyung-sung, (China) Liang Wenchong
15	2 Dec 2012	Golf Nippon Series JT Cup (3)	−10 (61-66-68-67=262)	5 strokes	(United States) Han Lee, (Japan) Toshinori Muto
16	27 Apr 2014	Tsuruya Open (3)	−4 (66-72-66-67=271)	Playoff	(South Korea) Park Sang-hyun
17	31 Aug 2014	RZ Everlasting KBC Augusta	−12 (71-66-74-65=276)	Playoff	(China) Liang Wenchong
18	28 Sep 2014	Asia-Pacific Diamond Cup Golf^{1} (2)	−6 (68-71-73-66=278)	2 strokes	(Thailand) Kiradech Aphibarnrat, (South Korea) Hur Suk-ho, (United States) Jason Knutzon

*Note: Tournament shortened to 54 holes due to weather.
^{1}Co-sanctioned by the Asian Tour

Japan Golf Tour playoff record (5–3)

No.	Year	Tournament	Opponent(s)	Result
1	2001	Diamond Cup Tournament	(Japan) Yuji Igarashi, (Japan) Toshimitsu Izawa	Izawa won with par on first extra hole
2	2001	Sun Chlorella Classic	(Japan) Katsuyoshi Tomori	Won with birdie on first extra hole
3	2008	The Crowns	(Japan) Tomohiro Kondo	Lost to par on second extra hole
4	2010	Tsuruya Open	(Japan) Toru Taniguchi	Won with birdie on third extra hole
5	2010	Coca-Cola Tokai Classic	(Japan) Takashi Kanemoto, (Japan) Michio Matsumura	Matsumura won with par on third extra hole Kanemoto eliminated by par on first hole
6	2011	Golf Nippon Series JT Cup	(Japan) Toru Taniguchi	Won with par on second extra hole
7	2014	Tsuruya Open	(South Korea) Park Sang-hyun	Won with par on first extra hole
8	2014	RZ Everlasting KBC Augusta	(China) Liang Wenchong	Won with par on fifth extra hole

=== Japan Challenge Tour wins (2) ===
- 1997 Mito Green Open, Twin Fields Cup

=== Japan PGA Senior Tour wins (3) ===
No.	Date	Tournament	Winning score	Margin of victory	Runners-up
1	19 Jun 2022	Starts Senior Golf Tournament	−18 (64-66-68=198)	5 strokes	(Japan) Tetsuji Hiratsuka, (Thailand) Prayad Marksaeng, (New Zealand) David Smail, (South Korea) Suk Jong-yul, (Thailand) Thaworn Wiratchant
2	28 Aug 2022	Maruhan Cup Taiheiyo Club Senior	−9 (69-66=135)	1 stroke	(Japan) Shinichi Akiba, (Japan) Keiichiro Fukabori, (Japan) Takeshi Sakiyama
3	17 Sep 2023	Japan Senior Open Golf Championship	−10 (70-71-67-70=278)	1 stroke	(Thailand) Prayad Marksaeng, (Japan) Masayoshi Yamazoe

== Playoff record ==
PGA Tour Champions playoff record (0–1)

No.	Year	Tournament	Opponent	Result
1	2024	U.S. Senior Open	(England) Richard Bland	Lost to par on third extra hole after two-hole aggregate playoff; Bland: E (4-4=8), Fujita: E (4-4=8)

== Results in major championships ==
Tournament	2005	2006	2007	2008	2009	2010	2011	2012	2013	2014	2015
Masters Tournament							CUT		CUT		
U.S. Open						T58	CUT	T51	CUT		CUT
The Open Championship	T41					CUT	CUT	CUT	CUT		CUT
PGA Championship				T68	T56	CUT	CUT	CUT	CUT		

Did not play

CUT = missed the half-way cut
"T" indicates a tie for a place

== Results in World Golf Championships ==
Results not in chronological order before 2015.

Tournament	2010	2011	2012	2013	2014	2015
Championship		T61				73
Match Play		R64		R64		
Invitational						
Champions	T46	T46	T11	T50		

Did not play

QF, R16, R32, R64 = Round in which player lost in match play
"T" = Tied

== Team appearances ==
- World Cup (representing Japan): 1997, 2009
- Alfred Dunhill Cup (representing Japan): 1998
- Dynasty Cup (representing Japan): 2003, 2005
- Royal Trophy (representing Asia): 2013

== See also ==
- List of golfers with most Japan Golf Tour wins
