= Shintaro Kai =

Japanese professional golfer (born 1981)

Personal information
- Nationality: Japan
- Born: 29 May 1981 (age 45) Miyazaki Prefecture, Japan
- Height: 1.77 m (5 ft 10 in)
- Weight: 87 kg (192 lb; 13.7 st)

Career
- Sport: Golf
- College: Nippon Sport Science University
- Turned professional: 2004
- Current tour: Japan Golf Tour
- Professional wins: 2
- Highest ranking: 85 (4 January 2009)

Number of wins by tour
- Japan Golf Tour: 1
- Other: 1

Best results in major championships
- Masters Tournament: DNP
- PGA Championship: DNP
- U.S. Open: CUT: 2009
- The Open Championship: CUT: 2008

Shintaro Kai (born 29 May 1981) is a Japanese professional golfer.

== Career ==
Kai has won one tournament on the Japan Golf Tour and has featured in the top 100 of the Official World Golf Ranking. He has also won a tournament on the Japan Challenge Tour.

== Professional wins (2) ==
=== Japan Golf Tour wins (1) ===
No.	Date	Tournament	Winning score	Margin of victory	Runner-up
1	31 Aug 2008	Vana H Cup KBC Augusta	−10 (69-70-70-69=278)	1 stroke	(Japan) Hidemasa Hoshino

=== Japan Challenge Tour wins (1) ===
No.	Date	Tournament	Winning score	Margin of victory	Runner-up
1	27 Jun 2014	Landic Golf Tournament Associa Mansion Memorial	−12 (69-63=132)	1 stroke	(Japan) Mitsuhiro Watanabe

== Results in major championships ==
Tournament	2008	2009
U.S. Open		CUT
The Open Championship	CUT	

Note: Kai never played in the Masters Tournament or the PGA Championship.

Did not play

CUT = missed the half-way cut
