= Han Lee =

Korean-American professional golfer

Personal information
- Full name: Lee Han-ju
- Nationality: United States
- Born: September 2, 1977 (age 49) Seoul, South Korea
- Height: 1.90 m (6 ft 3 in)
- Weight: 91 kg (201 lb; 14.3 st)

Career
- Sport: Golf
- College: University of California, Berkeley
- Turned professional: 2000
- Current tour: Japan Challenge Tour
- Former tours: Asian Tour; Nationwide Tour; Japan Golf Tour; Asian Development Tour
- Professional wins: 2

Number of wins by tour
- Japan Golf Tour: 1
- Other: 1

Lee Han-ju (born September 2, 1977), commonly known as Han Lee, is a Korean-born American professional golfer.

== Early life and amateur career ==
Lee was born in Seoul, South Korea.

Lee played college golf at the University of California, Berkeley. He won the Canadian Amateur in 1999 and 2000.

== Professional career ==
In 2000, Lee turned professional. He played on the Nationwide Tour from 2002 to 2004. He played on the Asian Tour in 2007 and 2008.

Lee has played on the Japan Golf Tour since 2008. He has one victory, the 2012 Mynavi ABC Championship and has also twice tied for second, at the 2009 Canon Open and the 2009 Mitsui Sumitomo VISA Taiheiyo Masters.

== Amateur wins ==
- 1999 Canadian Amateur
- 2000 Canadian Amateur

== Professional wins (2) ==
=== Japan Golf Tour wins (1) ===
No.	Date	Tournament	Winning score	Margin of victory	Runner-up
1	Oct 28, 2012	Mynavi ABC Championship	−17 (67-71-70-63=271)	1 stroke	(Japan) Katsumasa Miyamoto

=== Asian Development Tour wins (1) ===
No.	Date	Tournament	Winning score	Margin of victory	Runner-up
1	Oct 12, 2018	CCM Championship^{1}	−13 (68-70-65=203)	2 strokes	(Malaysia) Wilson Choo

^{1}Co-sanctioned by the Professional Golf of Malaysia Tour

== Playoff record ==
Korean Tour playoff record (0–1)

No.	Year	Tournament	Opponents	Result
1	2006	Pocari Energy Open	(South Korea) Kim Kyung-tae (a), (South Korea) Suk Jong-yul	Kim won with birdie on second extra hole Suk eliminated by birdie on first hole

== Results in World Golf Championships ==
Tournament	2012
Match Play	
Championship	
Invitational	
Champions	T54

Did not play

"T" = Tied
