= Koumei Oda =

Japanese professional golfer

Koumei Oda 小田 孔明
Personal information
- Nationality: Japan
- Born: 7 June 1978 (age 48) Tagawa, Fukuoka
- Height: 1.76 m (5 ft 9 in)
- Weight: 85 kg (187 lb; 13.4 st)

Career
- Sport: Golf
- Turned professional: 2000
- Current tour: Japan Golf Tour
- Professional wins: 8
- Highest ranking: 53 (7 December 2014)

Number of wins by tour
- Japan Golf Tour: 8

Best results in major championships
- Masters Tournament: DNP
- PGA Championship: T40: 2014
- U.S. Open: DNP
- The Open Championship: T39: 2014

Achievements and awards
- Japan Golf Tour money list winner: 2014
- Japan Golf Tour Most Valuable Player: 2014

Koumei Oda (Japanese: 小田 孔明, Oda Kōmei; born 7 June 1978) is a Japanese professional golfer.

== Career ==
Oda was born in Tagawa, Fukuoka. He turned professional in 2000.

Oda won the 2008 Casio World Open and the 2009 Token Homemate Cup. He competed in the 2009 Open Championship at Turnberry, but failed to make the cut, finishing day two at 14 over par. He retained the Casio World Open in 2009 and the Token Homemate Cup in 2010.

In 2011, he won the Diamond Cup Golf for his fifth Japan Golf Tour win. In September 2013, Oda won the ANA Open, the victory was his sixth on the Japan Golf Tour. In May 2014, Oda won the Kansai Open Golf Championship for his seventh Japan Golf Tour win. He would follow with his eighth victory on tour later that year in October, when he won the Bridgestone Open.

== Professional wins (8) ==
=== Japan Golf Tour wins (8) ===
No.	Date	Tournament	Winning score	Margin of victory	Runner(s)-up
1	30 Nov 2008	Casio World Open	−11 (66-67-72-72=277)	3 strokes	(Japan) Kenichi Kuboya
2	19 Apr 2009	Token Homemate Cup	−10 (69-70-67-68=274)	Playoff	(South Korea) Kim Jong-duck
3	29 Nov 2009	Casio World Open (2)	−21 (67-65-70-65=267)	3 strokes	(Japan) Ryo Ishikawa
4	18 Apr 2010	Token Homemate Cup (2)	−1 (74-70-68-71=283)	Playoff	(Japan) Satoru Hirota, (Japan) Daisuke Maruyama
5	29 May 2011	Diamond Cup Golf	−16 (67-65-70-70=272)	4 strokes	(Japan) Toshinori Muto, (Japan) Kaname Yokoo
6	21 Sep 2013	ANA Open	−15 (66-68-71-68=273)	4 strokes	(Japan) Shingo Katayama, (South Korea) Lee Kyoung-hoon
7	25 May 2014	Kansai Open Golf Championship	−15 (71-66-69-67=273)	2 strokes	(Japan) Yoshinori Fujimoto
8	26 Oct 2014	Bridgestone Open	−15 (67-65-69-68=269)	1 stroke	(Japan) Hiroyuki Fujita

Japan Golf Tour playoff record (2–1)

No.	Year	Tournament	Opponent(s)	Result
1	2009	Token Homemate Cup	(South Korea) Kim Jong-duck	Won with par on second extra hole
2	2010	Token Homemate Cup	(Japan) Satoru Hirota, (Japan) Daisuke Maruyama	Won with birdie on fourth extra hole Hirota eliminated by par on second hole
3	2014	Nagashima Shigeo Invitational Sega Sammy Cup	(Japan) Ryo Ishikawa	Lost to birdie on third extra hole

== Results in major championships ==
Tournament	2009	2010	2011	2012	2013	2014	2015
Masters Tournament							
U.S. Open							
The Open Championship	CUT	CUT		CUT		T39	CUT
PGA Championship		CUT				T40	T72

Did not play

CUT = missed the half-way cut
"T" = tied

== Results in World Golf Championships ==
Results not in chronological order before 2015.

Tournament	2009	2010	2011	2012	2013	2014	2015
Championship							68
Match Play							
Invitational							T45
Champions	T17						

Did not play

"T" = Tied

== Team appearances ==
- Royal Trophy (representing Asia): 2010
- EurAsia Cup (representing Asia): 2014
