= Maekyung Open =

Korean golf tournament

GS Caltex Maekyung Open
Tournament information
- Location: Seongnam, South Korea
- Established: 1982
- Course: Nam Seoul Country Club
- Par: 71
- Length: 7,039 yards (6,436 m)
- Tours: Asian Tour; Korean Tour; OneAsia Tour; Asia Golf Circuit
- Format: Stroke play
- Prize fund: ₩1,300,000,000
- Month played: May

Tournament record score
- Aggregate: 267 Kim Kyung-tae (2011)
- To par: −21 as above

Current champion
- (South Korea) Song Min-hyuk

Final champion
- Location in South Korea

The GS Caltex Maekyung Open, as it is known for sponsorship reasons, is a professional golf tournament that takes place in Seongnam, Gyeonggi Province, South Korea. It was established in 1982, replacing the Korea Open as the South Korean event on the Asia Golf Circuit. Between 1999 and 2009 (except for 2004) it was a stop on the Asian Tour, and then in 2010 it became part of the OneAsia Tour schedule. Since 2018, it has again been a fixture on the Asian Tour, except for 2020 and 2021 due to restrictions in place during the COVID-19 pandemic.

In 2005, Korean Choi Sang-ho won the tournament and set an Asian Tour record as the oldest winner on tour at 50 years and 145 days.

This tournament has generally been staged at the Nam Seoul Country Club. It has only been staged in four venues. The other venues that have been used are Lakeside in 1998, 1999, 2004 and 2006, Gwanak in 1984 and Elysian Gangchon in 2020.

== Winners ==
Year	Tour(s) (Note: AGC − Asia Golf Circuit; ASA − Asian Tour; KOR − Korean Tour; ONE − OneAsia Tour.)	Winner	Score	To par	Margin of victory	Runner(s)-up	Venue
GS Caltex Maekyung Open
2026	ASA, KOR	(South Korea) Song Min-hyuk	273	−11	Playoff	(South Korea) Cho Min-gyu	Nam Seoul
2025	ASA, KOR	(South Korea) Mun Do-yeob	274	−10	3 strokes	(Thailand) Jazz Janewattananond (South Korea) Kim Baek-jun (South Korea) Lee Jung-hwan	Nam Seoul
2024	ASA, KOR	(South Korea) Kim Hong-taek	274	−10	Playoff	(Thailand) Chonlatit Chuenboonngam	Nam Seoul
2023	ASA, KOR	(South Korea) Jung Chan-min	197 (Note: Shortened to 54 holes due to weather.)	−16	6 strokes	(South Korea) Lee Jung-hwan (South Korea) Song Min-hyuk (a)	Nam Seoul
2022	ASA, KOR	(South Korea) Kim Bi-o (2)	275	−9	2 strokes	(South Korea) Cho Min-gyu	Nam Seoul
2021	KOR	(South Korea) Hur In-hoi	279	−5	2 strokes	(South Korea) Tom Kim	Nam Seoul
2020	~~ASA~~, (Note: Held without Asian Tour co-sanctioning due to the COVID-19 pandemic.) KOR	(South Korea) Lee Tae-hee (2)	199	−11	1 stroke	(South Korea) Cho Min-gyu (Australia) Jun Seok Lee	Elysian Gangchon
2019	ASA, KOR	(South Korea) Lee Tae-hee	275	−9	Playoff (Note: Lee won with a birdie on the third hole of a sudden-death playoff.)	(Finland) Janne Kaske	Nam Seoul
2018	ASA, KOR	(South Korea) Park Sang-hyun (2)	283	−1	Playoff (Note: Park won with a par on the third hole of a sudden-death playoff; Bhullar was eliminated on the first extra hole, and Hwang on the second.)	(India) Gaganjeet Bhullar (South Korea) Chang Yi-keun (South Korea) Hwang Jung-gon	Nam Seoul
2017	KOR, ONE	(South Korea) Lee Sang-hee	276	−8	2 strokes	(South Korea) Moon Kyong-jun	Nam Seoul
2016	KOR, ONE	(South Korea) Park Sang-hyun	280	−8	Playoff (Note: Park won with a par on the second hole of a sudden-death playoff.)	(South Korea) Lee Soo-min	Nam Seoul
2015	KOR, ONE	(South Korea) Moon Kyong-jun	284	−4	2 strokes	(New Zealand) Ryan Fox (South Korea) Kim Do-hoon 752 (Australia) Jason Norris (New Zealand) Gareth Paddison	Nam Seoul
2014	KOR, ONE	(South Korea) Park Jun-won	273	−15	3 strokes	(South Korea) Park Sang-hyun	Nam Seoul
2013	KOR, ONE	(South Korea) Ryu Hyun-woo	274	−14	1 stroke	(South Korea) Kim Do-hoon 753 (South Korea) Kim Hyung-sung	Nam Seoul
2012	KOR, ONE	(South Korea) Kim Bi-o	273	−15	5 strokes	(South Korea) Ryu Hyun-woo	Nam Seoul
2011	KOR, ONE	(South Korea) Kim Kyung-tae (2)	267	−21	8 strokes	(South Korea) Kim Hyung-sung (South Korea) Cho Min-kyu	Nam Seoul
2010	KOR, ONE	(South Korea) Kim Dae-hyun	270	−18	4 strokes	(South Korea) Kim Kyung-tae	Nam Seoul
2009	ASA, KOR	(South Korea) Bae Sang-moon	281	−7	Playoff (Note: Bae won with a par on the second hole of a sudden-death playoff.)	(South Korea) Ted Oh	Nam Seoul
2008	ASA, KOR	(South Korea) Hwang Inn-choon	279	−9	Playoff (Note: Hwang won with a par on the first hole of a sudden-death playoff.)	(South Korea) Noh Seung-yul	Nam Seoul
2007	ASA, KOR	(South Korea) Kim Kyung-tae	270	−18	5 strokes	(China) Liang Wenchong	Nam Seoul
2006	ASA, KOR	(South Korea) Suk Jong-yul	271	−17	1 stroke	(United States) Bryan Saltus	Lakeside
KT&G Maekyung Open
2005	ASA, KOR	(South Korea) Choi Sang-ho	278	−10	3 strokes	(Thailand) Thaworn Wiratchant	Nam Seoul
Maekyung Open
2004	KOR	(United States) Mark Calcavecchia	282	−6	2 strokes	(South Korea) Jang Ik-jae	Lakeside
2003	ASA, KOR	(South Korea) Chung Joon	275	−13	1 stroke	(India) Amandeep Johl	Nam Seoul
Maekyung LG Fashion Open
2002	ASA, KOR	(New Zealand) Eddie Lee (a)	268	−20	1 stroke	(Thailand) Thammanoon Sriroj	Nam Seoul
2001	ASA, KOR	(South Korea) Choi Gwang-soo	271	−17	1 stroke	(India) Arjun Atwal (South Korea) Kim Dae-sub (a)	Nam Seoul
2000	ASA, KOR	(South Korea) Kang Wook-soon	278	−10	1 stroke	(Australia) Kim Felton	Nam Seoul
Maekyung Daks Open
1999	ASA, KOR	(South Africa) James Kingston	277	−11	Playoff	(Myanmar) Kyi Hla Han	Lakeside
Maekyung LG Fashion Open
1998	AGC, KOR	(Hong Kong) Scott Rowe	205	−11	3 strokes	(South Korea) Kwon Young-suk	Lakeside
1997	AGC, KOR	(South Korea) Shin Yong-jin	272	−16	1 stroke	(United States) Tim Balmer	Nam Seoul
1996	AGC, KOR	(South Korea) Park Nam-sin (2)	285	−3	5 strokes	(South Korea) Kim Sung-ho (United States) Rob Moss	Nam Seoul
Maekyung Bando Fashion Open
1995	AGC	(United States) Brandt Jobe	280	−8	4 strokes	(South Korea) Choi Sang-ho	Nam Seoul
Maekyung Open
1994	AGC	(South Korea) Kim Jong-duck	284	−4	Playoff	(Canada) Jim Rutledge (United States) Mike Tschetter	Nam Seoul
1993	AGC	(South Korea) Park Nam-sin	281	−7	1 stroke	(Taiwan) Yeh Chang-ting	New Korea
1992	AGC	(United States) Todd Hamilton	280	−8	Playoff	(Taiwan) Lin Chie-hsiang	Nam Seoul
1991	AGC	(South Korea) Choi Sang-ho	281	−7	2 strokes	(Taiwan) Hsieh Chin-sheng (South Korea) Park Nam-sin	Nam Seoul
1990	AGC	(South Korea) Lee Kang-sun	212	−4	3 strokes	(Taiwan) Hsieh Chin-sheng	Nam Seoul
1989	AGC	(Taiwan) Lu Hsi-chuen	277	−11	1 stroke	(Taiwan) Chen Liang-hsi	Nam Seoul
1988	AGC	(Philippines) Frankie Miñoza	279	−9	1 stroke	(South Korea) Lim Jin-han	Nam Seoul
1987	AGC	(Taiwan) Chen Liang-hsi	279	−9	3 strokes	(South Korea) Kim Sung-ho (United States) Brian Tennyson	Nam Seoul
1986	AGC	(Taiwan) Tsao Chien-teng	280	−8	1 stroke	(Taiwan) Hsieh Yu-shu	Nam Seoul
1985	AGC	(Taiwan) Chen Tze-chung	280	−8	2 strokes	(Mexico) Rafael Alarcón (Taiwan) Lu Chien-soon	Nam Seoul
1984	AGC	(Australia) Mike Clayton	283	−5	1 stroke	(United States) John Jacobs (Taiwan) Lu Hsi-chuen	Gwanak
1983	AGC	(Japan) Hiroshi Yamada	212	−4	1 stroke	(Taiwan) Lu Hsi-chuen	Seoul
1982	AGC	(South Korea) Kim Joo-heun (a)	285	−3	3 strokes	(Mexico) Rafael Alarcón	Seoul
