= KPGA Championship =

Tournament information
- Location: Yangsan, South Korea
- Established: 1958
- Course: A-One Country Club
- Par: 71
- Length: 7,048 yards (6,445 m)
- Tour: Korean Tour
- Format: Stroke play
- Prize fund: ₩1,600,000,000
- Month played: June

Tournament record score
- Aggregate: 262 Seo Yo-seop (2021)
- To par: −24 Jang Dong-kyu (2015)

Current champion
- (South Korea) Moon Dong-hyun

Final champion
- Location in South Korea

The KPGA Championship is a men's professional golf tournament that has been held annually in South Korea since 1958. Together with the Korea Open it is the longest running event on the Korean Tour. It is organised by the Korea Professional Golfers' Association (KPGA). Since 2016 the total purse has been KRW1,000,000,000 with KRW200,000,000 to the winner.

The 2017 Championship was won by Hwang Jung-gon. This win gave him an invitation to play in the CJ Cup in October 2017, the first PGA Tour event played in Korea.

== Winners ==
Year	Winner	Score	To par	Margin of victory	Runner(s)-up	Venue
KPGA Championship
2026	(South Korea) Moon Dong-hyun	275	−9	1 stroke	(South Korea) Kim Chan-woo	A-One
2025	(South Korea) Ok Tae-hoon	264	−20	3 strokes	(South Korea) Kim Min-kyu	A-One
2024	(South Korea) Jeon Ga-lam	267	−17	3 strokes	(South Korea) Bae Sang-moon (South Korea) Kim Hong-taek (South Korea) Lee Dai-han	A-One
2023	(South Korea) Choi Seung-bin	270	−14	1 stroke	(South Korea) Park Jun-hong	A-One
2022	(South Korea) Shin Sang-hun	267	−17	2 strokes	(South Korea) Hwang Jung-gon	A-One
2021	(South Korea) Seo Yo-seop	262	−18	4 strokes	(Canada) Sunil Jung	A-One
2020	(South Korea) Kim Seong-hyeon	275	−5	1 stroke	(South Korea) Ham Jeong-woo (South Korea) Lee Jae-kyeong	A-One
2019	(Australia) Won Joon Lee	265	−15	Playoff	(South Korea) Seo Hyung-seok	A-One
2018	(South Korea) Mun Do-yeob	268	−12	Playoff	(South Korea) Han Chang-won	A-One
2017	(South Korea) Hwang Jung-gon	268	−20	1 stroke	(South Korea) Kim Gi-whan (South Korea) Lee Hyung-joon	A-One
2016	(South Korea) Kim Jun-sung	270	−18	1 stroke	(South Korea) Park Jun-sub	A-One
2015	(South Korea) Jang Dong-kyu	264	−24	2 strokes	(South Korea) Kim Gi-whan (South Korea) Park Hyo-won	Sky 72
Yamaha Hankyung KPGA Championship
2014	(Australia) Matthew Griffin	268	−20	3 strokes	(South Korea) Moon Kyong-jun	Sky 72
Dongchon KPGA Championship
2013	(South Korea) Kim Hyung-tae	271	−17	Playoff	(South Korea) Lee Sang-hee	Dongchon
SBS Tour Happiness KJB KPGA Championship
2012	(South Korea) Lee Sang-hee	203 (Note: Shortened to 54 holes due to weather.)	−13	2 strokes	(South Korea) Kim Jae-ho (South Korea) Kim Seng-yong (South Korea) Park Jun-won	Happiness
Daishin Securities KPGA Championship
2011	(South Korea) Kim Byung-jun	273	−15	3 strokes	(South Korea) Yoon Jung-ho	Asiana
J-Golf KPGA Championship
2010	(South Korea) Son Joon-eob	274	−14	2 strokes	(South Korea) Hwang Inn-choon	Asiana
SBS Kumho Asiana KPGA Championship
2009	(South Korea) Hong Soon-sang	284	−4	Playoff	(South Korea) Park Sang-hyun	Asiana
NH NongHyup KPGA Championship
2008	(Australia) Andrew McKenzie	280	−8	Playoff	(South Korea) Park Sang-hyun (South Korea) Suk Jong-yul	Bear Creek
SBS Korea Golf and Art Village KPGA Championship
2007	(South Korea) Kim Chang-yoon	280	−8	1 stroke	(South Korea) Kim Kyung-tae	Korea CC
SBS LIG KPGA Championship
2006	(South Korea) Kim Hyung-sung	274	−14	2 strokes	(South Korea) Mo Joong-kyung	Haeundae
Dongbu Insurance Promy KPGA Championship
2005	(South Korea) Kim Dae-sub (2)	270	−18	2 strokes	(South Korea) Chung Joon	BA Vista
Phoenix Park Boat KPGA Championship
2004	(South Korea) Park Do-kyu	273	−15	4 strokes	(South Korea) Park No-seok	Phoenix
Samsung Securities KPGA Championship
2003	(South Korea) Park No-seok (2)	209	−7	1 stroke	(South Korea) Kim Jong-duck	Phoenix
2002	(South Korea) Kim Dae-sub	275	−13	2 strokes	(South Korea) Park Nam-sin	Phoenix
Lance Field KPGA Championship
2001	(South Korea) Shin Yong-jin (2)	266	−22	6 strokes	(South Korea) Kang Wook-soon	Phoenix
2000	(South Korea) Park No-seok	272	−16	1 stroke	(South Korea) Kang Wook-soon	88 CC
1999	(South Korea) Kang Wook-soon	280	−8	Playoff	(South Korea) Shin Yong-jin	Chun Ryong
Astra Cup KPGA Championship
1998	(South Korea) Kim Jong-duck	208 (Note: Shortened to 54 holes due to a committee error.)	−8	2 strokes	(South Korea) Park Nam-sin	88 CC
1997	(South Korea) K. J. Choi	271	−17	5 strokes	(South Korea) Park Nam-sin	New Seoul
1996	(South Korea) Shin Yong-jin	279	−9	1 stroke	(South Korea) Choi Gwang-soo	Gwangju
KPGA Championship
1995	(South Korea) Park Nam-sin	278				
1994	(South Korea) Choi Sang-ho (6)	270				
1993	(South Korea) Lee Kang-sun	272				
1992	(South Korea) Choi Sang-ho (5)	270				
1991	(South Korea) Cho Chul-sang	290				
1990	(South Korea) Choi Youn-soo (3)	283				
1989	(South Korea) Cho Sang-ho (4)	281				
1988	(South Korea) Choi Youn-soo (2)	275				
1987	(South Korea) Choi Youn-soo	283				
1986	(South Korea) Choi Sang-ho (3)	280				
1985	(South Korea) Choi Sang-ho (2)	278				
1984	(South Korea) Lim Jin-han (2)	282				
1983	(South Korea) Lim Jin-han	288				
1982	(South Korea) Choi Sang-ho	281				
1981	(South Korea) Park Jung-woong	283				
1980	(South Korea) Kim Seung-hack (2)	272				
1979	(South Korea) Lee Kang-chun	282				
1978	(South Korea) Cho Ho-sang	278				
1977	(South Korea) Cho Tae-ho	290				
1976	(South Korea) Kim Seung-hack	283				
1975	(South Korea) Cho Am-gil	288				
1974	(South Korea) Kim Suk-bong	280				
1973	(South Korea) Lee Il-ahn (2)	274				
1972	(South Korea) Son Hung-soo	273				
1971	(South Korea) Han Chang-sang (7)	285				
1970	(South Korea) Han Chang-sang (6)	280				
1969	(South Korea) Han Chang-sang (5)	284				
1968	(South Korea) Han Chang-sang (4)	282				
1967	(South Korea) Lee Il-ahn	285				
1966	(United States) Orville Moody (2)	289				
1965	(South Korea) Hong Duck-san	302				
1964	(South Korea) Han Chang-sang (3)	282				
1963	(South Korea) Kim Hak-young	299				
1962	(South Korea) Han Chang-sang (2)	293				
1961	(South Korea) Kim Bok-man	301				
1960	(South Korea) Han Chang-sang	295				
1959	(United States) Orville Moody	296				
1958	(South Korea) Yun Duk-choon	306				
