= 2004 Korean Tour =

Golf tour season

2004 Korean Tour season
- Duration: 6 May 2004 – 10 August 2004
- Number of official events: 8
- Order of Merit: (South Korea) Jang Ik-jae
- Player of the Year: (South Korea) Yang Yong-eun
- Rookie of the Year: (South Korea) Lee Jung-hoon

The 2004 Korean Tour was the 27th season on the Korean Tour, the main professional golf tour in South Korea since it was formed in 1978.

== Schedule ==
The following table lists official events during the 2004 season.

Date	Tournament	Location	Purse (₩)	Winner (Note: The number in brackets after each winner's name is the number of Korean Tour events they had won up to and including that tournament. This information is only shown for Korean Tour members.)	OWGR points	Other tours (Note: ASA − Asian Tour.)	Notes
9 May	Maekyung Open	Gyeonggi	500,000,000	(United States) Mark Calcavecchia (n/a)	n/a		
23 May	SK Telecom Open	Gyeonggi	500,000,000	(Scotland) Simon Yates (n/a)	10	ASA	
6 Jun	Pocari Energy Open	Gyeonggi	250,000,000	(South Korea) Charlie Wi (4)	n/a		
20 Jun	Jayu Group Open	Gyeonggi	350,000,000	(South Korea) Park No-seok (5)	n/a		
9 Jul	Sports Toto Open	Gyeonggi	150,000,000	(South Korea) Mo Joong-kyung (3)	n/a		New tournament
12 Sep	Kolon Korea Open	South Chungcheong	500,000,000	(United States) Edward Loar (n/a)	14	ASA	
19 Sep	Phoenix Park Boat KPGA Championship	Gangwon	400,000,000	(South Korea) Park Do-kyu (3)	n/a		
10 Oct	SBS Dongyang Fire Cup	Gyeonggi	200,000,000	(South Korea) K. J. Choi (10)	n/a		

== Order of Merit ==
The Order of Merit was based on prize money won during the season, calculated in South Korean won.

Position	Player	Prize money (₩)
1	(South Korea) Jang Ik-jae	143,080,000
2	(South Korea) Charlie Wi	125,966,667
3	(South Korea) Park No-seok	124,158,333
4	(South Korea) Park Do-kyu	94,253,429
5	(South Korea) Kim Dae-sub	78,235,000

== Awards ==
Award	Winner	Ref.
Player of the Year (Grand Prize Award)	(South Korea) Yang Yong-eun	
Rookie of the Year (Myeong-chul Award)	(South Korea) Lee Jung-hoon	
