= K. J. Choi =

South Korean professional golfer (born 1970)

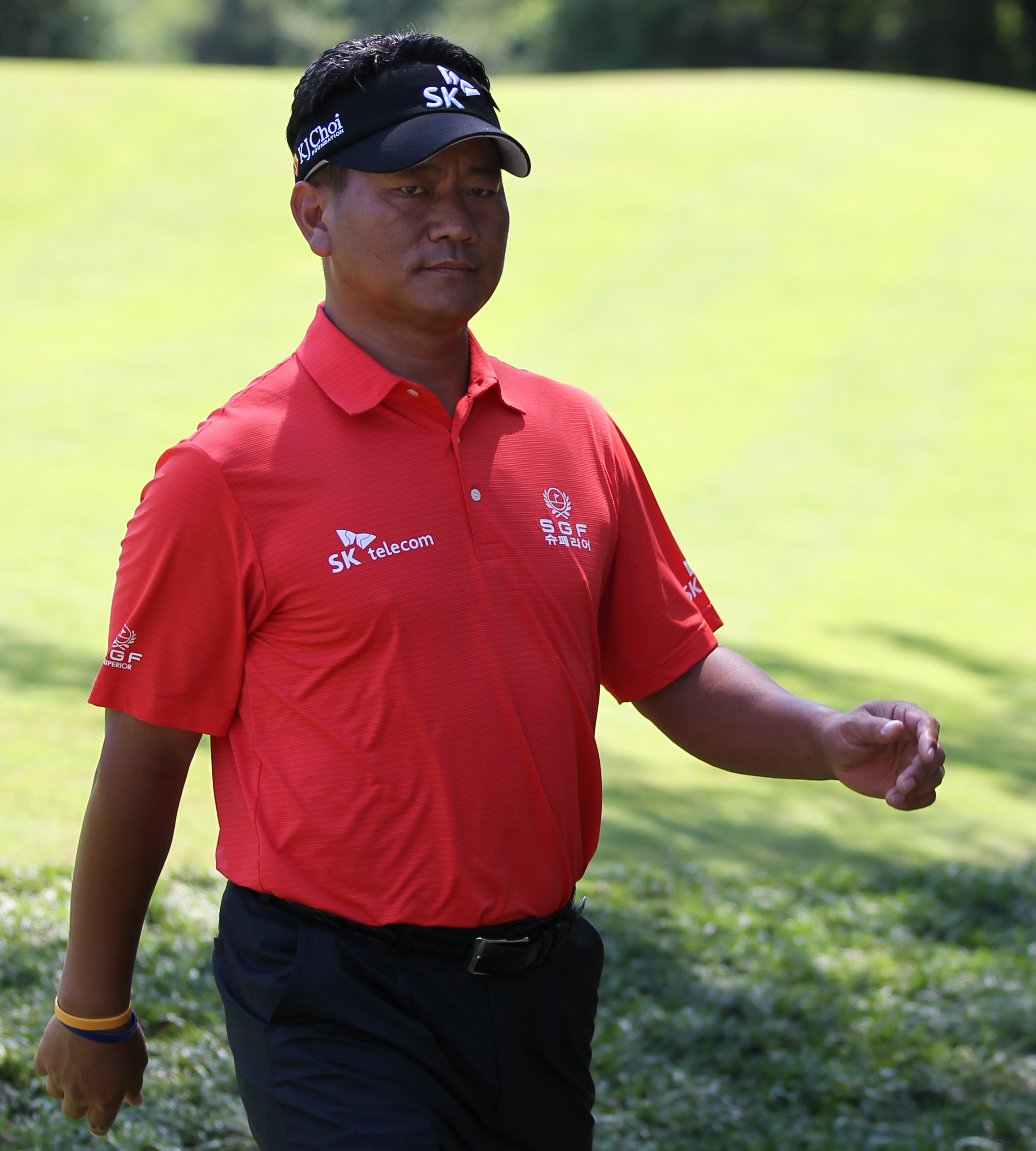
- Choi in June 2011

Personal information
- Full name: Choi Kyung-Ju
- Nicknames: Tank, Hawkeye
- Nationality: South Korea
- Born: 19 May 1970 (age 56) Wando, South Korea
- Height: 5 ft 8 in (1.73 m)
- Weight: 185 lb (84 kg)
- Spouse: Hyunjung Kim
- Children: 3

Career
- Sport: Golf
- College: Gwangju University
- Turned professional: 1994
- Current tour: PGA Tour Champions
- Former tours: PGA Tour; Japan Golf Tour; Asian Tour; Korean Tour
- Professional wins: 33
- Highest ranking: 5 (9 March 2008)

Number of wins by tour
- PGA Tour: 8
- European Tour: 1
- Japan Golf Tour: 2
- Asian Tour: 6
- PGA Tour Champions: 2
- European Senior Tour: 1
- Other: 14

Best results in major championships
- Masters Tournament: 3rd: 2004
- PGA Championship: T6: 2004
- U.S. Open: T15: 2005, 2012
- The Open Championship: T8: 2007

Achievements and awards
- Korean Tour Rookie of the Year: 1995
- Korean Tour Order of Merit winner: 1996, 1997
- Korean Tour Player of the Year: 1996, 1997, 2002, 2003
- Asia Golf Circuit Order of Merit winner: 1999

Choi Kyung-Ju (Korean: 최경주; born 19 May 1970), commonly known as K. J. Choi, is a South Korean professional golfer who currently plays on the PGA Tour Champions. Since turning pro in 1994, he has won more than thirty professional golf tournaments worldwide, including eight on the PGA Tour. His most notable victory came at the 2011 Players Championship, and he has spent 40 weeks in the top-10 of the world rankings.

== Professional career ==
In 1994, Choi turned professional after fulfilling his military obligation.

After establishing his career on the Korean Tour, where he picked up his first professional win in 1995, and the Japan Golf Tour, where he won twice in 1999, Choi qualified for membership of the U.S.-based PGA Tour by finishing tied 35th at the 1999 qualifying tournament. He was the first Korean to earn a PGA Tour card. In his rookie season in 2000 he finished 134th on the money list and had to requalify, but since 2001 he has been a consistent performer on the tour. In 2002 he became the first Korean to win on the PGA Tour at the Compaq Classic of New Orleans, and followed it up with another victory at the Tampa Bay Classic later that year.

In 2003 he won the Linde German Masters on the European Tour, his first and only win to date on the European Tour.

Choi won Jack Nicklaus's Memorial Tournament in 2007. He mentioned on CBS during the AT&T National that he read Jack Nicklaus's "Golf My Way" book early in his golf career, which assisted him in becoming the golfer he is today.

Choi won the first AT&T National hosted by Tiger Woods at the Congressional Country Club in Bethesda, Maryland. The trophy is a small replica of the U.S. Capitol building in Washington, DC. He made a spectacular sand trap shot on the 17th hole for a birdie to clinch the win over Steve Stricker by 3 shots. Choi was a crowd favorite and threw his golf ball into the crowd after holing his sand shot on the 17th hole.

In August 2007 he reached the top 10 of the world rankings for the first time. In January 2008, Choi won the Sony Open in Hawaii and rose to world number 7. In March 2008, Choi reached fifth place in the rankings.

After his 7th PGA Tour victory at the 2008 Sony Open in Hawaii, Choi donated $320,000 of his earnings to the victims' families of a warehouse fire in Seoul, South Korea, which killed over forty people.

Choi won his fourth title on the Asian Tour in Malaysia in 2009 at the Iskandar Johor Open, which was reduced to 3 rounds due to inclement weather.

In May 2011, Choi won The Players Championship at TPC Sawgrass in a playoff against David Toms. Choi had a one shot lead going down the 18th hole in regulation time, but Toms made birdie while Choi could only chip and putt for a par taking it to a sudden-death playoff. Both players found the green at the first extra hole, the 17th, and then missed with their attempted birdie efforts. Toms however also missed the return four footer for par leaving Choi with a three-foot par putt to seal victory. This to date is the South Korean's biggest PGA Tour victory. Following his win, Choi donated $200,000 to help victims of the tornadoes that ravaged the southeastern United States in April.

In February 2016, Choi finished runner-up at the Farmers Insurance Open to Brandt Snedeker, during a Monday finish to the weather disrupted event. This was notable because it was the first time in Choi's PGA Tour career that he did not convert a 54-hole lead or co-lead into a win. He was previously 5 for 5 in converted 54 holes leads to victories. The result moved Choi up 197 places in the world rankings from 334th to 137th. Choi continued his good early season from at the Northern Trust Open where he finished in a tie for fifth, despite holding the co-lead during the final round. This moved Choi to just outside the top 100 at 102nd in the rankings.

In May 2020, Choi turned 50 years of age and qualified for the PGA Tour Champions. In September 2021, Choi won his first tournament on that tour, the PURE Insurance Championship at Pebble Beach Golf Links in Pebble Beach, California.

In November 2022, Choi visited Vietnam to co-design with golf architect Paul Albanese the Rock Valley Course at Amber Hills Golf & Resort in Bắc Giang province near Hanoi.

At the 2024 Senior Open at Carnoustie Golf Links in Carnoustie, Angus, Scotland, in July 2024, Choi kept the lead he held after both the second and third round and won the tournament, becoming the first South Korean player to win a Senior Major Championship, men or women. After birdies on the 12th and 13th holes in the last round and an eagle on the 14th hole, Choi reached a four-shot-lead. He finally finished two shots ahead of runner-up Richard Green.

== Personal life ==
Choi was born in Wando, South Korea. Before picking up golf, he was a competitive power lifter, being able to squat 350 pounds (159 kg) as a 95-pound (43 kg) 13-year-old, thus aptly nicknamed "Tank" by South Koreans. He currently resides in Southlake, Texas, near fellow South Korean PGA Tour player Yang Yong-eun.

He is a devout Christian and member of the Korean United Methodist Church. In December 2023, he was ordained as an elder at Onnuri Community Church. His wedding to his equally devout Christian wife was officiated by Rev. Ha Yong-jo of that church.

Choi played the role of professional golfer T.K. Oh in the Christian sports movie Seven Days in Utopia.

He has donated much of his money to charity through the K.J. Choi Foundation.

With golf becoming an official event at the 2016 Summer Olympics, Choi served as the coach for the South Korean men's golf team.

In his hometown of Wando, a public square named "Choi Kyung-ju Plaza" honors him.

== Professional wins (33) ==
=== PGA Tour wins (8) ===
Legend
Players Championships (1)
Other PGA Tour (7)

No.	Date	Tournament	Winning score	To par	Margin of victory	Runner(s)-up
1	5 May 2002	Compaq Classic of New Orleans	68-65-71-67=271	−17	4 strokes	(United States) Dudley Hart, (Australia) Geoff Ogilvy
2	22 Sep 2002	Tampa Bay Classic	63-68-68-68=267	−17	7 strokes	(United States) Glen Day
3	2 Oct 2005	Chrysler Classic of Greensboro	64-69-67-66=266	−22	2 strokes	(Japan) Shigeki Maruyama
4	29 Oct 2006	Chrysler Championship (2)	68-66-70-67=271	−13	4 strokes	(United States) Paul Goydos, (United States) Brett Wetterich
5	3 Jun 2007	Memorial Tournament	69-70-67-65=271	−17	1 stroke	(United States) Ryan Moore
6	8 Jul 2007	AT&T National	66-67-70-68=271	−9	3 strokes	(United States) Steve Stricker
7	13 Jan 2008	Sony Open in Hawaii	64-65-66-71=266	−14	3 strokes	(South Africa) Rory Sabbatini
8	15 May 2011	The Players Championship	70-68-67-70=275	−13	Playoff	(United States) David Toms

PGA Tour playoff record (1–0)

No.	Year	Tournament	Opponent	Result
1	2011	The Players Championship	(United States) David Toms	Won with par on first extra hole

=== European Tour wins (1) ===
No.	Date	Tournament	Winning score	To par	Margin of victory	Runner-up
1	21 Sep 2003	Linde German Masters	63-68-64-67=262	−26	2 strokes	(Spain) Miguel Ángel Jiménez

=== Japan Golf Tour wins (2) ===
No.	Date	Tournament	Winning score	To par	Margin of victory	Runner-up
1	25 Apr 1999	Kirin Open^{1}	65-68-71=204 (Note: Shortened to 54 holes due to weather.)	−9	Playoff	(India) Jeev Milkha Singh
2	23 May 1999	Ube Kosan Open	69-65-66-72=272	−16	3 strokes	(Japan) Kazuhiko Hosokawa

^{1}Co-sanctioned by the Asia Golf Circuit

Japan Golf Tour playoff record (1–0)

No.	Year	Tournament	Opponent	Result
1	1999	Kirin Open	(India) Jeev Milkha Singh	Won with par on first extra hole

=== Asian Tour wins (6) ===
No.	Date	Tournament	Winning score	To par	Margin of victory	Runner(s)-up
1	19 Sep 1999	Kolon Korea Open^{1}	71-71-67-69=278	−10	1 stroke	(Myanmar) Kyi Hla Han
2	28 Jun 2003	SK Telecom Open^{1}	64-69-68=201	−15	Playoff	(South Korea) Shin Yong-jin
3	8 May 2005	SK Telecom Open^{1} (2)	67-71-68-69=275	−13	5 strokes	(Australia) Andrew Buckle, (United States) Fred Couples
4	25 Oct 2009	Iskandar Johor Open	68-64-64=196	−20	4 strokes	(Thailand) Chapchai Nirat
5	23 Oct 2011	CJ Invitational^{1}	67-70-67-67=271	−17	2 strokes	(South Korea) Noh Seung-yul
6	7 Oct 2012	CJ Invitational^{1} (2)	69-65-68-67=269	−15	2 strokes	(South Korea) Bae Sang-moon, (South Korea) Jang Dong-kyu

^{1}Co-sanctioned by the Korean Tour

Asian Tour playoff record (1–0)

No.	Year	Tournament	Opponent	Result
1	2003	SK Telecom Open	(South Korea) Shin Yong-jin	Won with birdie on second extra hole

=== Korean Tour wins (17) ===
No.	Date	Tournament	Winning score	To par	Margin of victory	Runner(s)-up
1	21 May 1995	Phantom Open	67-71-69-73=280	−8	2 strokes	(South Korea) Park Nam-sin
2	15 Sep 1996	Elord Korea Open	69-73-69-68=279	−9	1 stroke	(South Korea) Kim Jong-duck
3	25 May 1997	Phantom Open (2)	66-68-70-71=275	−13	4 strokes	(South Korea) Jung Do-man
4	22 Jun 1997	Astra Cup KPGA Championship	70-66-66-69=271	−17	5 strokes	(South Korea) Park Nam-sin
5	28 Jun 1997	Daily Sports Pocari Open	69-70-74=213	−13	1 stroke	(South Korea) Nam Young-woo
6	19 Sep 1999	Kolon Korea Open^{1}	71-71-67-69=278	−10	1 stroke	(Myanmar) Kyi Hla Han
7	16 Oct 1999	KPGA Cup	72-66-65-71=274	−14	2 strokes	(South Korea) Park No-seok
8	12 Nov 2000	Superior Open	71-65-71-71=278	−10	2 strokes	(South Korea) Kim Tae-hoon, (South Korea) Suk Jong-yul
9	28 Jun 2003	SK Telecom Open^{1}	64-69-68=201	−15	Playoff	(South Korea) Shin Yong-jin
10	10 Oct 2004	SBS Dongyang Fire Cup	71-68-73-69=281	−7	1 stroke	(South Korea) Lee Boo-young
11	8 May 2005	SK Telecom Open^{1} (2)	67-71-68-69=275	−13	3 strokes	(Australia) Andrew Buckle, (United States) Fred Couples
12	14 Oct 2007	Shinhan Donghae Open	70-69-70-66=275	−13	1 stroke	(South Korea) Suk Jong-yul
13	20 Apr 2008	SK Telecom Open (3)	71-64-71-66=272	−16	4 strokes	(South Korea) Kang Kyung-nam
14	27 May 2008	Shinhan Donghae Open (2)	70-69-70-66=275	−13	3 strokes	(South Korea) Hur Suk-ho
15	23 Oct 2011	CJ Invitational^{1}	67-70-67-67=271	−17	2 strokes	(South Korea) Noh Seung-yul
16	7 Oct 2012	CJ Invitational^{1} (2)	69-65-68-67=269	−15	2 strokes	(South Korea) Bae Sang-moon, (South Korea) Jang Dong-kyu
17	19 May 2024	SK Telecom Open (4)	71-64-72-74=281	−3	Playoff	(South Korea) Park Sang-hyun

^{1}Co-sanctioned by the Asian Tour

Korean Tour playoff record (2–2)

No.	Year	Tournament	Opponent(s)	Result
1	1995	Shinhan Donghae Open	(South Korea) Choi Sang-ho, (United States) Mike Tschetter	Choi Sang-ho won with birdie on first extra hole
2	2003	SK Telecom Open	(South Korea) Shin Yong-jin	Won with birdie on second extra hole
3	2005	Shinhan Donghae Open	(South Korea) Kim Jong-duck	Lost to birdie on first extra hole
4	2024	SK Telecom Open	(South Korea) Park Sang-hyun	Won with par on second extra hole

=== Other wins (2) ===
No.	Date	Tournament	Winning score	To par	Margin of victory	Runner-up
1	23 Mar 1996	Parmax Invitational	72-70-71=213	−3	6 strokes	(South Korea) Lim Jin-han
2	30 Nov 2008	LG Skins Game	US$415,000		$165,000	(Canada) Stephen Ames

=== PGA Tour Champions wins (2) ===
Legend
Senior major championships (1)
Other PGA Tour Champions (1)

No.	Date	Tournament	Winning score	To par	Margin of victory	Runner(s)-up
1	26 Sep 2021	PURE Insurance Championship	67-68-68=203	−13	2 strokes	(Germany) Alex Čejka, (Germany) Bernhard Langer
2	28 Jul 2024	The Senior Open Championship	69-69-70-70=278	−10	2 strokes	(Australia) Richard Green

PGA Tour Champions playoff record (0–1)

No.	Year	Tournament	Opponents	Result
1	2021	Sanford International	(Northern Ireland) Darren Clarke, (United States) Steve Flesch	Clarke won with birdie on second extra hole Flesch eliminated by par on first hole

== Results in major championships ==
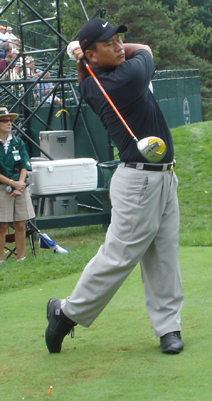
K.J. hits a drive during a 2005 PGA Championship practice round at Baltusrol Golf Club.

Tournament	1998	1999
Masters Tournament		
U.S. Open		
The Open Championship	CUT	T49
PGA Championship		

Tournament	2000	2001	2002	2003	2004	2005	2006	2007	2008	2009
Masters Tournament				T15	3	T33	CUT	T27	41	CUT
U.S. Open		CUT	T30	CUT	T31	T15	CUT	CUT	CUT	T47
The Open Championship			CUT	T22	T16	T41	CUT	T8	T16	CUT
PGA Championship		T29	CUT	T69	T6	T40	T7	T12	CUT	T24

Tournament	2010	2011	2012	2013	2014	2015	2016
Masters Tournament	T4	T8	CUT	T46	T34		
U.S. Open	T47	CUT	T15	T32			
The Open Championship	CUT	T44	T39	T44	CUT		
PGA Championship	T39	T39	T54	T47	CUT		T22

Tournament	2017–2024	2025
Masters Tournament		
PGA Championship		
U.S. Open		
The Open Championship		CUT

Top 10
Did not play

CUT = missed the half-way cut
"T" = tied

=== Summary ===
Tournament	Wins	2nd	3rd	Top-5	Top-10	Top-25	Events	Cuts made
Masters Tournament	0	0	1	2	3	4	12	9
U.S. Open	0	0	0	0	0	2	13	7
The Open Championship	0	0	0	0	1	4	16	9
PGA Championship	0	0	0	0	2	5	15	12
Totals	0	0	1	2	6	15	56	37

- Most consecutive cuts made – 10 (2003 Open Championship – 2005 PGA)
- Longest streak of top-10s – 1 (six times)

== The Players Championship ==
=== Wins (1) ===
Year	Championship	54 holes	Winning score	Margin	Runner-up
2011	The Players Championship	1 shot deficit	−13 (70-68-67-70=275)	Playoff	(United States) David Toms

=== Results timeline ===
Tournament	2002	2003	2004	2005	2006	2007	2008	2009
The Players Championship	T28	CUT	T42	CUT	T16	T23	CUT	T71

Tournament	2010	2011	2012	2013	2014	2015	2016	2017
The Players Championship	T34	1	CUT	T48	T13	T42	T43	CUT

Win

CUT = missed the halfway cut
"T" indicates a tie for a place.

== Results in World Golf Championships ==
Tournament	2002	2003	2004	2005	2006	2007	2008	2009	2010	2011	2012	2013
Match Play		R32	R64	R64	R64	R32	QF	R64		R32	R64	R64
Championship		T6	T57	T43	T32	T19	T12	T59		T39	T35	
Invitational	T19	T53	T58	T51	T22	T11	T16	T45	T46	T59	T8	
Champions									T30	T16		

Top 10
Did not play

QF, R16, R32, R64 = Round in which player lost in match play
"T" = Tied
Note that the HSBC Champions did not become a WGC event until 2009.

== Senior major championships ==
=== Wins (1) ===
Year	Championship	54 holes	Winning score	Margin	Runner-up
2024	Senior Open Championship	1 shot lead	−10 (69-69-70-70=278)	2 strokes	(Australia) Richard Green

=== Results timeline ===
Results are not in chronological order

Tournament	2021	2022	2023	2024	2025	2026
Senior PGA Championship	T3	T4	T26	T32		CUT
The Tradition		T36		T6		T28
U.S. Senior Open		CUT	11	T22	T28	T38
Senior Players Championship	T32	T11	T3	4	T16	T36
The Senior Open Championship			T14	1	T24	T7

Win
Top 10
Did not play

CUT = missed the halfway cut
"T" indicates a tie for a place

== Team appearances ==
Professional

- World Cup (representing South Korea): 1997, 2002, 2003, 2005, 2013
- Presidents Cup (International Team): 2003 (tie), 2007, 2011

== See also ==
- 1999 PGA Tour Qualifying School graduates
- 2000 PGA Tour Qualifying School graduates
- List of golfers with most Asian Tour wins
