= 1998 Korean Tour =

Golf tour season

1998 Korean Tour season
- Duration: 30 April 1998 – 20 September 1998
- Number of official events: 7
- Most wins: (South Korea) Choi Gwang-soo (2)
- Order of Merit: (South Korea) Choi Gwang-soo
- Player of the Year: (South Korea) Choi Gwang-soo
- Rookie of the Year: (South Korea) Kim Seung-il

The 1998 Korean Tour was the 21st season on the Korean Tour, the main professional golf tour in South Korea since it was formed in 1978.

== Schedule ==
The following table lists official events during the 1998 season.

Date	Tournament	Location	Purse (₩)	Winner (Note: The number in brackets after each winner's name is the number of Korean Tour events they had won up to and including that tournament. This information is only shown for Korean Tour members.)	Other tours (Note: AGC − Asia Golf Circuit; ASA − Asian PGA Tour.)	Notes
3 May	Maekyung LG Fashion Open	Gyeonggi	350,000,000	(Hong Kong) Scott Rowe (n/a)	AGC	
17 May	Astra Cup KPGA Championship	South Gyeongsang	150,000,000	(South Korea) Kim Jong-duck (6)		
24 May	Fila Open	Gyeonggi	US$150,000	(United States) Robert Huxtable (n/a)	ASA	
31 May	SK Telecom Classic	South Gyeongsang	200,000,000	(South Korea) Choi Gwang-soo (6)		
5 Sep	Superior Open	Gyeonggi	120,000,000	(South Korea) Choi Gwang-soo (7)		
12 Sep	SBS Pro Golf Championship	Gyeonggi	100,000,000	(South Korea) Park Nam-sin (15)		
20 Sep	Kolon Sports Korea Open	Gyeonggi	350,000,000	(South Korea) Kim Dae-sub (a) (1)	ASA	

== Order of Merit ==
The Order of Merit was based on prize money won during the season, calculated in South Korean won.

Position	Player	Prize money (₩)
1	(South Korea) Choi Gwang-soo	83,234,470
2	(South Korea) Park Nam-sin	74,517,410
3	(South Korea) Choi Sang-ho	73,310,476
4	(South Korea) K. J. Choi	70,104,600
5	(South Korea) Kim Jong-duck	47,307,000

== Awards ==
Award	Winner	Ref.
Player of the Year (Grand Prize Award)	(South Korea) Choi Gwang-soo	
Rookie of the Year (Myeong-chul Award)	(South Korea) Kim Seung-il	
