= 2006 Korean Tour =

Golf tour season

2006 Korean Tour season
- Duration: 13 April 2006 – 17 November 2006
- Number of official events: 17
- Most wins: (South Korea) Kang Kyung-nam (2) (South Korea) Kim Kyung-tae (2)
- Order of Merit: (South Korea) Kang Kyung-nam
- Player of the Year: (South Korea) Yang Yong-eun
- Rookie of the Year: (South Korea) Choi Jin-ho

The 2006 Korean Tour, titled as the 2006 SBS Korean Tour for sponsorship reasons, was the 29th season on the Korean Tour, the main professional golf tour in South Korea since it was formed in 1978.

It was the second season of the tour under a title sponsorship agreement with Seoul Broadcasting System, that was announced in June 2004.

== Schedule ==
The following table lists official events during the 2006 season.

Date	Tournament	Location	Purse (₩)	Winner (Note: The number in brackets after each winner's name is the number of Korean Tour events they had won up to and including that tournament. This information is only shown for Korean Tour members.)	OWGR points	Other tours (Note: ASA − Asian Tour.)	Notes
16 Apr	SBS Lotte Skyhill Open	Jeju	300,000,000	(South Korea) Kang Sung-hoon (a) (1)	n/a		
30 Apr	GS Caltex Maekyung Open	Gyeonggi	600,000,000	(South Korea) Suk Jong-yul (2)	14	ASA	
7 May	SK Telecom Open	Gyeonggi	600,000,000	(Thailand) Prom Meesawat (n/a)	14	ASA	
14 May	SBS Meritz Solmoro Open	Gyeonggi	300,000,000	(South Korea) Park Boo-won (1)	n/a		New tournament
21 May	SBS Jisan Resort Open	Gyeonggi	300,000,000	(Australia) Marc Leishman (1)	n/a		
28 May	Pocari Energy Open	Gyeonggi	400,000,000	(South Korea) Kim Kyung-tae (a) (1)	n/a		
4 Jun	SBS Kumho Asiana Open	Gyeonggi	500,000,000	(South Korea) Shin Yong-jin (8)	n/a		New tournament
30 Jul	SBS Gaya Open	South Gyeongsang	300,000,000	(South Korea) Mo Joong-kyung (4)	n/a		New tournament
3 Aug	Shinhan Donghae Open	Gyeonggi	600,000,000	(South Korea) Kang Ji-man (1)	n/a		
10 Sep	SBS Samsung Benest Open	Gyeonggi	600,000,000	(South Korea) Kim Kyung-tae (a) (2)	n/a		
17 Sep	SBS Tomato Savings Bank Zephyros Open	Jeju	300,000,000	(South Korea) Kang Kyung-nam (1)	n/a		New tournament
24 Sep	Kolon-Hana Bank Korea Open	South Chungcheong	700,000,000	(South Korea) Yang Yong-eun (2)	16	ASA	
1 Oct	SBS Jungheung Gold Lake Open	South Jeolla	300,000,000	(South Korea) Kang Kyung-nam (2)	n/a		New tournament
15 Oct	SBS Vivaldi Park Open	Gangwon	300,000,000	(South Korea) Choi Jin-ho (1)	n/a		
22 Oct	SBS LIG KPGA Championship	South Gyeongsang	400,000,000	(South Korea) Kim Hyung-sung (1)	n/a		
5 Nov	SBS Emerson Pacific Group Open	South Gyeongsang	300,000,000	(South Korea) Bae Sang-moon (1)	n/a		
12 Nov	SBS Hana Tour Championship	Gyeonggi	300,000,000	(South Korea) Kim Hyung-tae (1)	n/a		

== Order of Merit ==
The Order of Merit was based on prize money won during the season, calculated in South Korean won.

Position	Player	Prize money (₩)
1	(South Korea) Kang Kyung-nam	302,623,333
2	(South Korea) Shin Yong-jin	297,216,798
3	(South Korea) Kang Ji-man	276,827,750
4	(South Korea) Yang Yong-eun	234,666,667
5	(South Korea) Kim Hyung-tae	206,956,667

== Awards ==
Award	Winner	Ref.
Player of the Year (Grand Prize Award)	(South Korea) Yang Yong-eun	
Rookie of the Year (Myeong-chul Award)	(South Korea) Choi Jin-ho	
