= 2005 Korean Tour =

Golf tour season

2005 Korean Tour season
- Duration: 14 April 2005 – 26 November 2005
- Number of official events: 16
- Most wins: (South Korea) Choi Gwang-soo (2) (South Korea) Jang Ik-jae (2) (South Korea) Kim Jong-duck (2)
- Order of Merit: (South Korea) Choi Gwang-soo
- Player of the Year: (South Korea) Hur Suk-ho
- Rookie of the Year: (South Korea) Kang Kyung-nam

The 2005 Korean Tour, titled as the 2005 SBS Korean Tour for sponsorship reasons, was the 28th season on the Korean Tour, the main professional golf tour in South Korea since it was formed in 1978.

== SBS title sponsorship ==
In June 2004, it was announced that the tour had signed a title sponsorship agreement with Seoul Broadcasting System, being renamed as the SBS Korean Tour. The agreement was reported to be worth ₩15,000,000,000 over five years.

== Schedule ==
The following table lists official events during the 2005 season.

Date	Tournament	Location	Purse (₩)	Winner (Note: The number in brackets after each winner's name is the number of Korean Tour events they had won up to and including that tournament. This information is only shown for Korean Tour members.)	OWGR points	Other tours (Note: ASA − Asian Tour.)	Notes
17 Apr	Skyhill Jeju Open	Jeju	300,000,000	(South Korea) Kim Jong-duck (7)	n/a		
8 May	SK Telecom Open	Gyeonggi	500,000,000	(South Korea) K. J. Choi (11)	14	ASA	
22 May	Jisan Resort Open	Gyeonggi	300,000,000	(South Korea) Nam Young-woo (1)	n/a		New tournament
29 May	KT&G Maekyung Open	Gyeonggi	500,000,000	(South Korea) Choi Sang-ho (43)	6	ASA	
12 Jun	Pocari Energy Open	Gyeonggi	300,000,000	(South Korea) Shin Yong-jin (7)	n/a		
26 Jun	Rhode Land Classic	Jeju	300,000,000	(South Korea) Chung Joon (3)	n/a		New tournament
31 Jul	Gaya Open	South Gyeongsang	200,000,000	(South Korea) Choi Gwang-soo (14)	n/a		New tournament
28 Aug	Samsung Benest Open	Gyeonggi	500,000,000	(South Korea) Jang Ik-jae (3)	n/a		New tournament
4 Sep	Emerson Pacific Group Open	South Gyeongsang	300,000,000	(South Korea) Park No-seok (6)	n/a		New tournament
11 Sep	Kia Lotze Vivaldi Park Open	Gangwon	300,000,000	(South Korea) Lee In-woo (1)	n/a		New tournament
25 Sep	Kumho Asiana Open	Gyeonggi	500,000,000	(South Korea) Jang Ik-jae (4)	n/a		New tournament
2 Oct	Kolon-Hana Bank Korea Open	South Chungcheong	500,000,000	(South Korea) Choi Gwang-soo (15)	n/a		
16 Oct	Shinhan Donghae Open	Gyeonggi	600,000,000	(South Korea) Kim Jong-duck (8)	n/a		
23 Oct	GS Caltex Masters	Jeju	500,000,000	(South Korea) Charlie Wi (5)	n/a		New tournament
6 Nov	Dongbu Insurance Promy KPGA Championship	Gyeonggi	300,000,000	(South Korea) Kim Dae-sub (5)	n/a		
26 Nov	Bando Bora CC Tour Championship	South Jeolla	300,000,000	(South Korea) Yoo Jong-koo (1)	n/a		New tournament

== Order of Merit ==
The Order of Merit was based on prize money won during the season, calculated in South Korean won.

Position	Player	Prize money (₩)
1	(South Korea) Choi Gwang-soo	265,434,825
2	(South Korea) Park No-seok	257,305,857
3	(South Korea) Choi Sang-ho	241,606,000
4	(South Korea) Kim Dae-sub	225,963,333
5	(South Korea) Jang Ik-jae	222,180,000

== Awards ==
Award	Winner	Ref.
Player of the Year (Grand Prize Award)	(South Korea) Hur Suk-ho	
Rookie of the Year (Myeong-chul Award)	(South Korea) Kang Kyung-nam	
