= Yang Yong-eun =

South Korean professional golfer (born 1972)

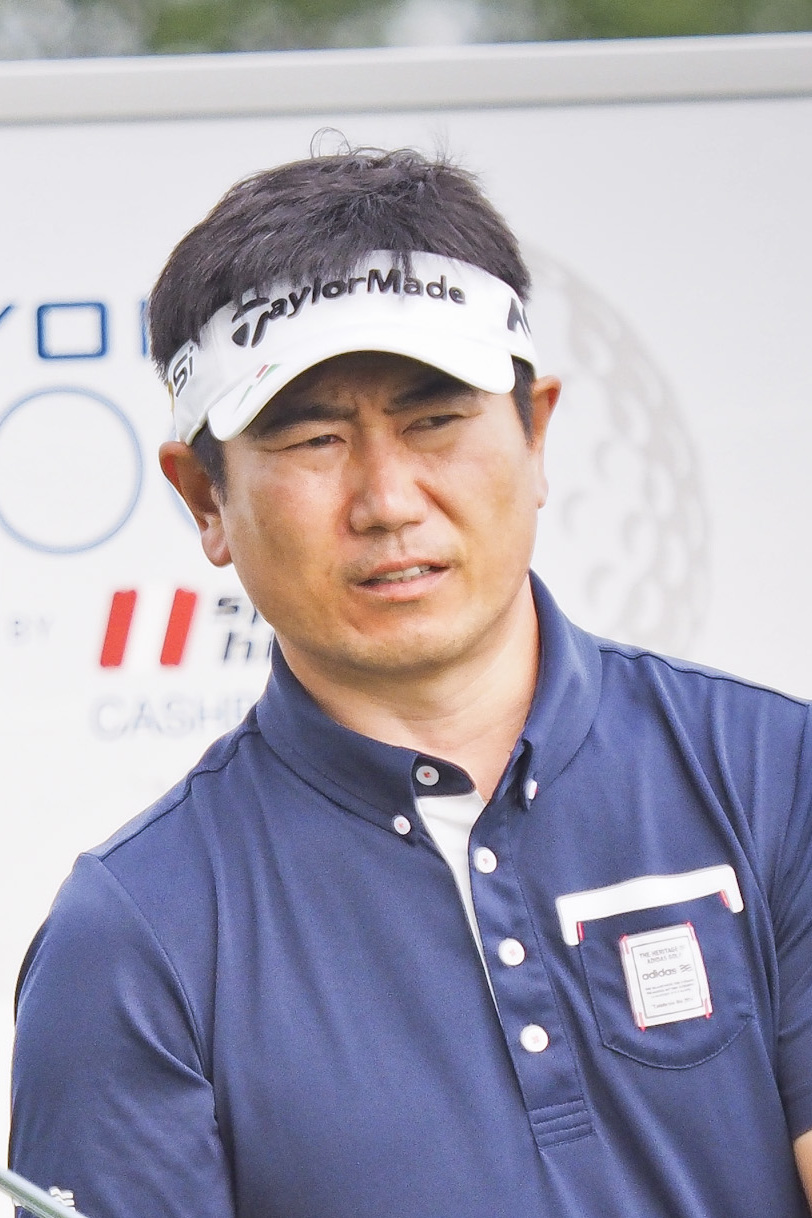
- Yang in 2016

Personal information
- Full name: Yang Yong-eun
- Nickname: The Tiger Killer
- Nationality: South Korea
- Born: 15 January 1972 (age 54) Sindo-ri, Daejeong-eup, Seogwipo-si Jeju-do, South Korea
- Height: 1.76 m (5 ft 9 in)
- Weight: 80 kg (180 lb; 13 st)

Career
- Sport: Golf
- Turned professional: 1996
- Current tour: PGA Tour Champions
- Former tours: PGA Tour; European Tour; Japan Golf Tour; Asian Tour
- Professional wins: 13
- Highest ranking: 19 (16 May 2010)

Number of wins by tour
- PGA Tour: 2
- European Tour: 3
- Japan Golf Tour: 5
- Asian Tour: 1
- PGA Tour Champions: 1
- Other: 2

Best results in major championships (wins: 1)
- Masters Tournament: T8: 2010
- PGA Championship: Won: 2009
- U.S. Open: T3: 2011
- The Open Championship: T16: 2011

Achievements and awards
- Korean Tour Rookie of the Year: 1999
- Korean Tour Player of the Year: 2004, 2006

Yang Yong-eun (Korean: 양용은; born 15 January 1972), also called Y. E. Yang, is a South Korean professional golfer who currently plays on the PGA Tour Champions. He was previously a member of the PGA Tour, where he won twice, including most notably the 2009 PGA Championship when he came from behind to defeat Tiger Woods, thus winning the first major championship by a male player born in Asia. He is occasionally known by the nickname The Tiger Killer.

== Early life ==
Yang was born in the island province of Jeju-do. He is the fourth of eight children. He started to play golf at the age of 19 while picking golf balls part-time and, later, working as a golf instructor at Jeju's Ora Country Club. Yang learned by watching the movements of players who visited his golf club. Although he now has coaches, Yang is a self-taught golfer. His brother recommended he try hitting balls at a local driving range. Trying to get a 'proper job', Yang fell down a flight of stairs and tore his ACL while he was learning to use an excavator for a construction company. After recovering from his knee injury, he began mandatory service in the South Korean military at the age of 21.

== Professional career ==
On the conclusion of his military service, Yang moved to New Zealand, where he pursued a professional career in golf. He turned semi-pro on 21 July 1995 and pro on 22 August 1996.

In 2006, Yang won the Korea Open, an Asian Tour event, gaining him entry into the HSBC Champions Tournament in November 2006. He won the tournament, beating a strong field including runner-up Tiger Woods. The victory earned him membership of the European Tour and moved him into the top 40 of the Official World Golf Ranking. In 2008 he played on the PGA Tour after earning his membership through qualifying school; he had to regain his tour card in 2009 after placing 157th on the money list in 2008. Yang won his first title on the PGA Tour at the 2009 Honda Classic in his 46th career start in the United States. With this win, he became only the second Korean after K. J. Choi to win on the PGA Tour.

On 16 August 2009, Yang won the 91st PGA Championship, his first major championship, overcoming a two-shot deficit going into the final round to finish three strokes ahead of Woods, his playing partner. The victory was the first major championship for a male player born in Asia, surpassing the runners-up finishes achieved by Lu Liang-Huan in the 1971 Open Championship, Isao Aoki in the 1980 U.S. Open and Chen Tze-chung in the 1985 U.S. Open. The previous best finish by a Korean was Choi's 3rd place in the 2004 Masters Tournament. It was also the first (and only) time that Woods had failed to win a major after holding at least a share of the lead at the end of 54 holes. Yang was ranked 110th worldwide prior to the tournament, but moved up to 34th after the victory. The win earned Yang a five-year PGA Tour exemption and helped him to a top ten finish overall on the PGA Tour.

In April 2010, Yang won the Volvo China Open with a one-under-par 71 final round. In February 2011, Yang had his best run at the WGC-Accenture Match Play Championship reaching the quarter-finals before eventually succumbing to American Matt Kuchar, 2 & 1. Previously Yang had defeated Álvaro Quirós on the 20th hole in round one, Stewart Cink, 4 & 3, in round two and the 2010 U.S. Open champion Graeme McDowell in round three, 3 & 2.

The following week Yang was in contention for his 3rd PGA Tour title at The Honda Classic, an event where he had earned his inaugural PGA Tour win in 2009. Despite entering the final round five strokes behind the eventual winner Rory Sabbatini, he was able to close the gap to just one stroke by birdieing the par-three 15th, where he was 18 inches away from a hole in one. However, needing an eagle on the par-five 18th after Sabbatini had stretched his lead to two with a birdie on the par-four 16th, he was unable to hole his bunker shot and a birdie earned him a runner-up finish one stroke behind the winner.

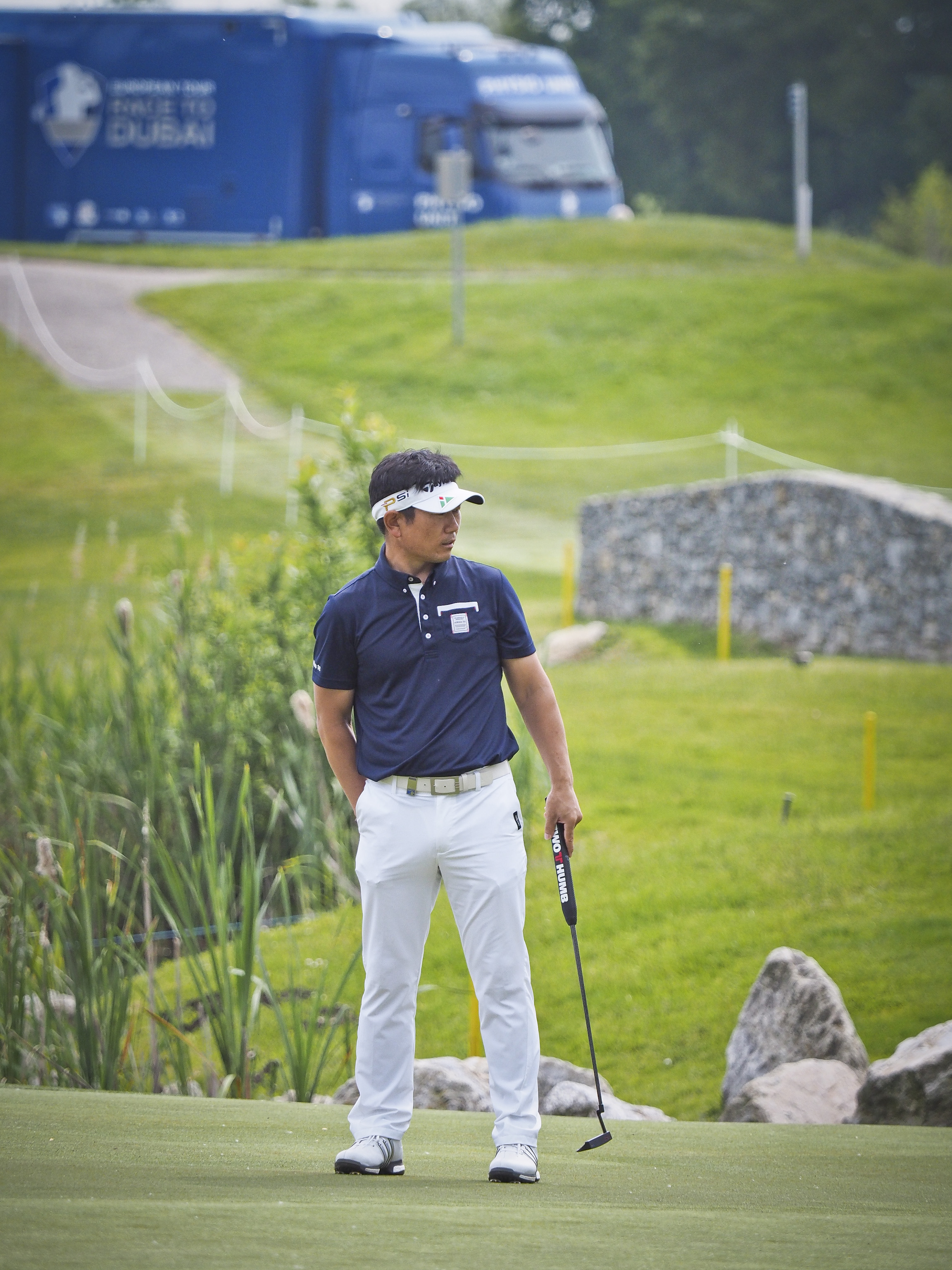
Yang at the 2016 Lyoness Open.

Yang reached a career high OWGR ranking of 19th in 2010, but a string of bad finishes and missed cuts in 2013 and 2014 plummeted the former major winner to 638th at the end of 2014, the final year of his PGA Tour exemption after winning the 2009 PGA Championship. A poor 2014 saw Yang finish well outside the top 150 in the FedEx Cup, which limited him to the Past Champions category for 2015. Yang spent much of 2015 playing on the European Tour and Asian Tour. 2015 saw a resurgence for Yang, making the cut at the PGA Championship for the first time in multiple years. Yang moved up to 262nd in the world by November 2015. After a poor 2016 European Tour season where he finished outside 110th, Yang regained his Tour card through Q School.

In 2021, Yang was disqualified from 103rd PGA Championship at The Ocean Course, Kiawah Island Resort, in South Carolina for signing an incorrect scorecard following the second round.

He is an active owner of an indoor golf range in the Koreatown section of Dallas.

In February 2022, after turning 50, Yang joined the PGA Tour Champions.

== Personal life ==
Yang is married to Mi Jin Kim. He lives in Honolulu, Hawaii and Atlanta, Georgia.

== Professional wins (13) ==
=== PGA Tour wins (2) ===
Legend
Major championships (1)
Other PGA Tour (1)

No.	Date	Tournament	Winning score	Margin of victory	Runner-up
1	8 Mar 2009	The Honda Classic	−9 (68-65-70-68=271)	1 stroke	(United States) John Rollins
2	16 Aug 2009	PGA Championship	−8 (73-70-67-70=280)	3 strokes	(United States) Tiger Woods

=== European Tour wins (3) ===
Legend
Major championships (1)
Other European Tour (2)

No.	Date	Tournament	Winning score	Margin of victory	Runner(s)-up
1	12 Nov 2006 (2007 season)	HSBC Champions^{1}	−14 (66-72-67-69=274)	2 strokes	(United States) Tiger Woods
2	16 Aug 2009	PGA Championship	−8 (73-70-67-70=280)	3 strokes	(United States) Tiger Woods
3	18 Apr 2010	Volvo China Open^{2}	−15 (68-66-68-71=273)	2 strokes	(Wales) Rhys Davies, (Wales) Stephen Dodd

^{1}Co-sanctioned by the Asian Tour, Sunshine Tour and PGA Tour of Australasia, but unofficial event on those tours.
^{2}Co-sanctioned by the OneAsia Tour

=== Japan Golf Tour wins (5) ===
No.	Date	Tournament	Winning score	Margin of victory	Runner(s)-up
1	8 Aug 2004	Sun Chlorella Classic	−13 (67-70-69-69=275)	3 strokes	(New Zealand) David Smail, (Taiwan) Yeh Wei-tze
2	7 Nov 2004	Asahi-Ryokuken Yomiuri Memorial	−17 (69-78-69-65=271)	2 strokes	(Japan) Shingo Katayama
3	9 Oct 2005	Coca-Cola Tokai Classic	−18 (66-72-65-67=270)	4 strokes	(Japan) Taichi Teshima
4	10 Sep 2006	Suntory Open	−14 (67-68-68-63=266)	6 strokes	(Japan) Hidemasa Hoshino, (Japan) Toru Taniguchi
5	29 Apr 2018	The Crowns	−12 (67-67-67-67=268)	4 strokes	(South Korea) Hwang Jung-gon, (Australia) Anthony Quayle

Japan Golf Tour playoff record (0–1)

No.	Year	Tournament	Opponent	Result
1	2006	ABC Championship	(Japan) Shingo Katayama	Lost to birdie on second extra hole

=== Asian Tour wins (1) ===
No.	Date	Tournament	Winning score	Margin of victory	Runner-up
1	24 Sep 2006	Kolon-Hana Bank Korea Open^{1}	−14 (65-67-68-70=270)	3 strokes	(South Korea) Kang Ji-man

^{1}Co-sanctioned by the Korean Tour

=== OneAsia Tour wins (2) ===
No.	Date	Tournament	Winning score	Margin of victory	Runners-up
1	18 Apr 2010	Volvo China Open^{1}	−15 (68-66-68-71=273)	2 strokes	(Wales) Rhys Davies, (Wales) Stephen Dodd
2	10 Oct 2010	Kolon Korea Open^{2}	−4 (74-71-69-66=280)	2 strokes	(South Korea) Choi Ho-sung, (South Korea) Kim Bi-o

^{1}Co-sanctioned by the European Tour
^{2}Co-sanctioned by the Korean Tour

OneAsia Tour playoff record (0–1)

No.	Year	Tournament	Opponent	Result
1	2012	Nanshan China Masters	(China) Liang Wenchong	Lost to birdie on fifth extra hole

=== Korean Tour wins (3) ===
No.	Date	Tournament	Winning score	Margin of victory	Runner(s)-up
1	3 Nov 2002	SBS Oriental Fire Cup	−11 (70-69-68-70=277)	Playoff	(South Korea) Choi Sang-ho, (South Korea) Park No-seok
2	24 Sep 2006	Kolon-Hana Bank Korea Open^{1}	−14 (65-67-68-70=270)	3 strokes	(South Korea) Kang Ji-man
3	10 Oct 2010	Kolon Korea Open^{2} (2)	−4 (74-71-69-66=280)	2 strokes	(South Korea) Choi Ho-sung, (South Korea) Kim Bi-o

^{1}Co-sanctioned by the Asian Tour
^{2}Co-sanctioned by the OneAsia Tour

Korean Tour playoff record (1–0)

No.	Year	Tournament	Opponents	Result
1	2002	SBS Oriental Fire Cup	(South Korea) Choi Sang-ho, (South Korea) Park No-seok	Won with eagle on first extra hole

=== PGA Tour Champions wins (1) ===
No.	Date	Tournament	Winning score	Margin of victory	Runner-up
1	8 Sep 2024	Ascension Charity Classic	−13 (65-69-66=200)	Playoff	(Germany) Bernhard Langer

PGA Tour Champions playoff record (1–1)

No.	Year	Tournament	Opponent	Result
1	2024	Ascension Charity Classic	(Germany) Bernhard Langer	Won with birdie on first extra hole
2	2026	Rogers Charity Classic	(New Zealand) Steven Alker	Lost to birdie on first extra hole

== Major championships ==
=== Wins (1) ===
Year	Championship	54 holes	Winning score	Margin	Runner-up
2009	PGA Championship	2 shot deficit	−8 (73-70-67-70=280)	3 strokes	(United States) Tiger Woods

=== Results timeline ===
Results not in chronological order in 2020.

Tournament	2005	2006	2007	2008	2009
Masters Tournament			T30		CUT
U.S. Open	CUT				
The Open Championship	CUT		CUT		
PGA Championship	T47		CUT		1

Tournament	2010	2011	2012	2013	2014	2015	2016	2017	2018
Masters Tournament	T8	T20	T57	CUT	CUT				
U.S. Open	CUT	T3	CUT	CUT	CUT				
The Open Championship	T60	T16	CUT	T32	CUT				
PGA Championship	CUT	T69	T36	CUT	CUT	T48	CUT	CUT	CUT

Tournament	2019	2020	2021	2022	2023	2024	2025	2026
Masters Tournament								
PGA Championship	CUT		DQ	CUT	CUT	CUT		CUT
U.S. Open								
The Open Championship		NT						

Win
Top 10
Did not play

CUT = missed the half-way cut
"T" = tied
DQ = disqualified
NT = no tournament due to COVID-19 pandemic

=== Summary ===
Tournament	Wins	2nd	3rd	Top-5	Top-10	Top-25	Events	Cuts made
Masters Tournament	0	0	0	0	1	2	7	4
PGA Championship	1	0	0	1	1	1	18	5
U.S. Open	0	0	1	1	1	1	6	1
The Open Championship	0	0	0	0	0	1	7	3
Totals	1	0	1	2	3	5	38	13

- Most consecutive cuts made – 5 (2011 Masters – 2012 Masters)
- Longest streak of top-10s – 2 (2009 PGA – 2010 Masters)

== Results in The Players Championship ==
Tournament	2009	2010	2011	2012	2013	2014
The Players Championship	CUT	T34	CUT	CUT	CUT	CUT

CUT = missed the halfway cut
"T" indicates a tie for a place

== Results in World Golf Championships ==
Tournament	2004	2005	2006	2007	2008	2009	2010	2011	2012
Match Play				R64			R32	QF	R32
Championship	64			T65		74	T30	T39	59
Invitational				T56		T19	T46	T53	T36
Champions						T33	T51		

Top 10
Did not play

QF, R16, R32, R64 = Round in which player lost in match play
"T" = tied
Note that the HSBC Champions did not become a WGC event until 2009.

== Team appearances ==
Professional

- Royal Trophy (representing Asia): 2007, 2012 (winners)
- Presidents Cup (International team): 2009, 2011
- World Cup (representing South Korea): 2009

== See also ==
- 2007 PGA Tour Qualifying School graduates
- 2008 PGA Tour Qualifying School graduates
- 2016 European Tour Qualifying School graduates
- List of men's major championships winning golfers
