= Jang Ik-jae =

South Korean golfer

Personal information
- Nickname: I.J.
- Nationality: South Korea
- Born: 14 February 1973 (age 53)
- Height: 1.74 m (5 ft 9 in)
- Weight: 72 kg (159 lb; 11.3 st)

Career
- Sport: Golf
- College: Korea University
- Turned professional: 1998
- Current tour: Japan PGA Senior Tour
- Former tours: Japan Golf Tour; Korean Tour
- Professional wins: 8

Number of wins by tour
- Japan Golf Tour: 3
- Other: 5

Achievements and awards
- Korean Tour Order of Merit winner: 2004
- Japan Golf Tour Rookie of the Year: 2005

Jang Ik-jae (Korean: 장익제; born 14 February 1973), also known as I.J. Jang, is a South Korean professional golfer.

== Career ==
Jang plays on the Japan Golf Tour, where he has won three times.

== Professional wins (8) ==
=== Japan Golf Tour wins (3) ===
No.	Date	Tournament	Winning score	Margin of victory	Runners-up
1	29 May 2005	Mitsubishi Diamond Cup Golf	−5 (74-69-64-68=275)	3 strokes	(Japan) Shingo Katayama, (Japan) Ryoken Kawagishi
2	29 Apr 2012	The Crowns	−8 (71-69-66-66=272)	2 strokes	(Australia) Steven Conran, (Japan) Yoshikazu Haku
3	3 May 2015	The Crowns (2)	−10 (66-69-68-67=270)	4 strokes	(Japan) Tomohiro Kondo, (Japan) Hideto Tanihara, (Japan) Kazuhiro Yamashita

Japan Golf Tour playoff record (0–1)

No.	Year	Tournament	Opponent	Result
1	2011	The Crowns	(Australia) Brendan Jones	Lost to birdie on first extra hole

=== Korean Tour wins (4) ===
No.	Date	Tournament	Winning score	Margin of victory	Runner(s)-up
1	19 Oct 2003	KTRD Open	−14 (69-70-67-68=274)	1 stroke	(South Korea) Kim Dae-sub
2	26 Oct 2003	SBS Dongyang Fire Cup	−13 (71-70-67-67=275)	1 stroke	(South Korea) Cho Hyun-jun
3	28 Aug 2005	Samsung Benest Open	−13 (70-69-71-65=275)	1 stroke	(South Korea) Park No-seok
4	25 Sep 2005	Kumho Asiana Open	−9 (71-70-70-68=279)	3 strokes	(South Korea) Jun Tae-hyun, (South Korea) Kang Kyung-nam

=== Japan PGA Senior Tour wins (1) ===
No.	Date	Tournament	Winning score	Margin of victory	Runners-up
1	21 Apr 2023	Nojima Champion Cup Hakone Senior Tournament	−9 (68-65=133)	1 stroke	(Japan) Hisao Ahara, (Japan) Keiichiro Fukabori, (Japan) Nobuhiro Masuda

== Results in World Golf Championships ==
Tournament	2012
Match Play	
Championship	
Invitational	
Champions	T34

Did not play

"T" = Tied

== Team appearances ==
Amateur

- Eisenhower Trophy (representing South Korea): 1994, 1996

Professional

- World Cup (representing South Korea): 2005
