= Jang Dong-kyu =

South Korean golfer

Personal information
- Nationality: South Korea
- Born: 22 October 1988 (age 38) Seoul, South Korea
- Height: 1.80 m (5 ft 11 in)
- Weight: 70 kg (150 lb; 11 st)

Career
- Sport: Golf
- Turned professional: 2006
- Current tours: Japan Golf Tour; Korean Tour; OneAsia Tour
- Professional wins: 3

Number of wins by tour
- Japan Golf Tour: 1
- Other: 2

Best results in major championships
- Masters Tournament: DNP
- PGA Championship: DNP
- U.S. Open: DNP
- The Open Championship: CUT: 2014, 2019

Jang Dong-kyu (Korean: 장동규; born 22 October 1988) is a South Korean professional golfer.

== Career ==
Jang plays on the Korean Tour and the Japan Golf Tour where he has one win, the 2014 Gateway to The Open Mizuno Open. His Mizuno Open win earned him entry into the 2014 Open Championship. He has won once on the Japan Challenge Tour, in 2013, and he also won the 2015 KPGA Championship.

== Professional wins (3) ==
=== Japan Golf Tour wins (1) ===
| No. | Date | Tournament | Winning score | Margin of victory | Runner-up |
|---|---|---|---|---|---|
| 1 | 1 Jun 2014 | Gateway to The Open Mizuno Open | −15 (70-67-67-69=273) | 3 strokes | (Philippines) Juvic Pagunsan |

=== Korean Tour wins (1) ===
| No. | Date | Tournament | Winning score | Margin of victory | Runners-up |
|---|---|---|---|---|---|
| 1 | 30 Aug 2015 | KPGA Championship | −24 (67-68-66-63=264) | 2 strokes | (South Korea) Kim Gi-whan, (South Korea) Park Hyo-won |

=== Japan Challenge Tour wins (1) ===
| No. | Date | Tournament | Winning score | Margin of victory | Runner-up |
|---|---|---|---|---|---|
| 1 | 7 Apr 2013 | Novil Cup | E (65-74-77=216) | Playoff | (Australia) James McLean |

== Results in major championships ==
| Tournament | 2014 | 2015 | 2016 | 2017 | 2018 |
|---|---|---|---|---|---|
| Masters Tournament | | | | | |
| U.S. Open | | | | | |
| The Open Championship | CUT | | | | |
| PGA Championship | | | | | |

| Tournament | 2019 |
|---|---|
| Masters Tournament | |
| PGA Championship | |
| U.S. Open | |
| The Open Championship | CUT |

Did not play

CUT = missed the halfway cut
