= 2014 Korean Tour =

Golf tour season

2014 Korean Tour season
- Duration: 17 April 2014 – 9 November 2014
- Number of official events: 14
- Most wins: (South Korea) Kim Seung-hyuk (2) (South Korea) Kim Woo-hyun (2) (South Korea) Park Sang-hyun (2)
- Order of Merit: (South Korea) Kim Seung-hyuk
- Player of the Year: (South Korea) Kim Seung-hyuk
- Rookie of the Year: (South Korea) Park Il-hwan

The 2014 Korean Tour was the 37th season on the Korean Tour, the main professional golf tour in South Korea since it was formed in 1978.

== Schedule ==
The following table lists official events during the 2014 season.

Date	Tournament	Location	Purse (₩)	Winner (Note: The number in brackets after each winner's name is the number of Korean Tour events they had won up to and including that tournament. This information is only shown for Korean Tour members.)	OWGR points	Other tours (Note: ONE − OneAsia Tour.)	Notes
20 Apr	Dongbu Insurance Promy Open	Gangwon	400,000,000	(South Korea) Lee Dong-min (1)	6		
11 May	GS Caltex Maekyung Open	Gyeonggi	1,000,000,000	(South Korea) Park Jun-won (1)	10	ONE	
18 May	SK Telecom Open	Gyeonggi	1,000,000,000	(South Korea) Kim Seung-hyuk (1)	10	ONE	
25 May	Descente Korea Munsingwear Matchplay Championship	South Gyeongsang	800,000,000	(South Korea) Lee Ki-sang (2)	8		
1 Jun	Happiness Songhak Construction Open	Gyeonggi	500,000,000	(South Korea) Kim Woo-hyun (1)	6		New tournament
15 Jun	Bosung CC Classic	South Jeolla	300,000,000	(South Korea) Kim Woo-hyun (2)	6		
29 Jun	Gunsan CC Open	North Jeolla	300,000,000	(South Korea) Joo Heung-chol (1)	6		
13 Jul	Yamaha Hankyung KPGA Championship	South Gyeongsang	1,000,000,000	(Australia) Matthew Griffin (3)	6		
10 Aug	Maeil Dairies Open	South Chungcheong	300,000,000	(South Korea) Hwang Jung-gon (1)	6		New tournament
24 Aug	Vainer Pineridge Open	Jeju	500,000,000	(South Korea) Park Sang-hyun (3)	6		New tournament
12 Oct	KJ Choi Invitational	South Jeolla	500,000,000	(South Korea) Park Sang-hyun (4)	7		
26 Oct	Kolon Korea Open	South Chungcheong	1,200,000,000	(South Korea) Kim Seung-hyuk (2)	12	ONE	
2 Nov	Herald KYJ Tour Championship	Jeju	300,000,000	(South Korea) Lee Hyung-joon (1)	7		
9 Nov	Shinhan Donghae Open	Gyeonggi	1,000,000,000	(South Korea) Bae Sang-moon (9)	8		

== Order of Merit ==
The Order of Merit was titled as the Ballantine's Points and was based on tournament results during the season, calculated using a points-based system.

Position	Player	Points
1	(South Korea) Kim Seung-hyuk	3,362
2	(South Korea) Park Sang-hyun	3,295
3	(South Korea) Kim Woo-hyun	2,700
4	(South Korea) Park Jun-won	2,230
5	(South Korea) Park Il-hwan	2,225

== Awards ==
Award	Winner	Ref.
Player of the Year (Grand Prize Award)	(South Korea) Kim Seung-hyuk	
Rookie of the Year (Myeong-chul Award)	(South Korea) Park Il-hwan	
