= 2003 Korean Tour =

Golf tour season

2003 Korean Tour season
- Duration: 1 May 2003 – 26 October 2003
- Number of official events: 11
- Most wins: (South Korea) Jang Ik-jae (2) (South Korea) Ted Oh (2)
- Order of Merit: (South Korea) Shin Yong-jin
- Player of the Year: (South Korea) K. J. Choi
- Rookie of the Year: (South Korea) Kim Sang-ki

The 2003 Korean Tour was the 26th season on the Korean Tour, the main professional golf tour in South Korea since it was formed in 1978.

== Schedule ==
The following table lists official events during the 2003 season.

Date	Tournament	Location	Purse (₩)	Winner (Note: The number in brackets after each winner's name is the number of Korean Tour events they had won up to and including that tournament. This information is only shown for Korean Tour members.)	OWGR points	Other tours (Note: ASA − Asian PGA Tour.)	Notes
4 May	Maekyung Open	Gyeonggi	500,000,000	(South Korea) Chung Joon (2)	6	ASA	
22 Jun	Pocari Energy Open	Gyeonggi	250,000,000	(South Korea) Kim Dae-sub (4)	n/a		
29 Jun	SK Telecom Open	Gyeonggi	500,000,000	(South Korea) K. J. Choi (9)	6	ASA	
25 Jul	TaylorMade Adidas Cup Cheongcheong Open	South Chungcheong	200,000,000	(South Korea) Ted Oh (1)	n/a		
3 Aug	Lancelot Cup Bookyung Open	South Chungcheong	200,000,000	(South Korea) Kang Wook-soon (9)	n/a		
29 Aug	Serastone Medical Instrument Honam Open	South Jeolla	200,000,000	(South Korea) Ted Oh (2)	n/a		
21 Sep	Samsung Securities KPGA Championship	Gangwon	550,000,000	(South Korea) Park No-seok (4)	n/a		
26 Sep	Yuseong Open	Daejeon	200,000,000	(South Korea) Lee Yong-hun (1)	n/a		New tournament
12 Oct	Kolon Korea Open	South Chungcheong	500,000,000	(United States) John Daly (n/a)	6	ASA	
19 Oct	KTRD Open	South Gyeongsang	300,000,000	(South Korea) Jang Ik-jae (1)	n/a		
26 Oct	SBS Dongyang Fire Cup	Gyeonggi	300,000,000	(South Korea) Jang Ik-jae (2)	n/a		

== Order of Merit ==
The Order of Merit was based on prize money won during the season, calculated in South Korean won.

Position	Player	Prize money (₩)
1	(South Korea) Shin Yong-jin	207,783,810
2	(South Korea) Chung Joon	177,420,000
3	(South Korea) Jang Ik-jae	169,964,000
4	(South Korea) Park No-seok	133,698,810
5	(South Korea) Kim Dae-sub	131,096,667

== Awards ==
Award	Winner	Ref.
Player of the Year (Grand Prize Award)	(South Korea) K. J. Choi	
Rookie of the Year (Myeong-chul Award)	(South Korea) Kim Sang-ki	
