= Kim Jong-duck =

South Korean golfer

Personal information
- Nationality: South Korea
- Born: 4 June 1961 (age 65)
- Height: 1.75 m (5 ft 9 in)
- Weight: 64 kg (141 lb; 10.1 st)

Career
- Sport: Golf
- Turned professional: 1986
- Former tours: Japan Golf Tour; Asia Golf Circuit; Korean Tour
- Professional wins: 18

Number of wins by tour
- Japan Golf Tour: 4
- Other: 14

Best results in major championships
- Masters Tournament: DNP
- PGA Championship: DNP
- U.S. Open: DNP
- The Open Championship: CUT: 1997, 1999

Achievements and awards
- Korean Tour Rookie of the Year: 1989
- Asia Golf Circuit Order of Merit winner: 1996–97

Kim Jong-duck (Korean: 김종덕; born 4 June 1961) is a South Korean professional golfer.

== Career ==
Kim played on the Asia Golf Circuit in the mid-1990s, winning for the first time at the Maekyung Open in 1994. Victory in the Japan Golf Tour co-sanctioned Kirin Open in 1997 secured the Asian Tour's money list title and qualified him to play on the Japan Tour. He had three further wins in Japan between 1999 and 2004.

== Professional wins (18) ==
=== Japan Golf Tour wins (4) ===
No.	Date	Tournament	Winning score	Margin of victory	Runner(s)-up
1	27 Apr 1997	Kirin Open^{1}	−10 (69-73-68-68=278)	1 stroke	(Japan) Shigeki Maruyama, (Japan) Hirofumi Miyase, (Japan) Tateo Ozaki, (United States) Brian Watts
2	21 Mar 1999	Dydo Drinco Shizuoka Open	−11 (65-68-72-72=277)	1 stroke	(Japan) Shusaku Sugimoto
3	20 Jun 1999	Super Mario Yomiuri Open	−18 (69-65-68-68=270)	3 strokes	(Japan) Hajime Meshiai, (Japan) Hidemichi Tanaka
4	25 Jul 2004	Sato Foods NST Niigata Open	−21 (64-67-65-67=263)	5 strokes	(Japan) Kazuhiro Kinjo

^{1}Co-sanctioned by the Asia Golf Circuit

Japan Golf Tour playoff record (0–1)

No.	Year	Tournament	Opponent	Result
1	2009	Token Homemate Cup	(Japan) Koumei Oda	Lost to par on second extra hole

=== Asia Golf Circuit wins (2) ===
No.	Date	Tournament	Winning score	Margin of victory	Runners-up
1	17 Apr 1994	Maekyung Open^{1}	−4 (74-72-70-68=284)	Playoff	(Canada) Jim Rutledge, (United States) Mike Tschetter
2	27 Apr 1997	Kirin Open^{2}	−10 (69-73-68-68=278)	1 stroke	(Japan) Shigeki Maruyama, (Japan) Hirofumi Miyase, (Japan) Tateo Ozaki, (United States) Brian Watts

^{1}Co-sanctioned by the Korean Tour
^{2}Co-sanctioned by the PGA of Japan Tour

Asia Golf Circuit playoff record (1–0)

No.	Year	Tournament	Opponents	Result
1	1994	Maekyung Open	(Canada) Jim Rutledge, (United States) Mike Tschetter	Won with par on second extra hole Rutledge eliminated by birdie on first hole

=== Korean Tour wins (8) ===
No.	Date	Tournament	Winning score	Margin of victory	Runner(s)-up
1	3 Jun 1989	Honam Open	−10 (70-71-68-69=278)	5 strokes	(South Korea) Choi Sang-ho
2	22 May 1993	Cambridge Members Open	−8 (69-70-69-72=280)	Playoff	(South Korea) Choi Sang-ho
3	17 Apr 1994	Maekyung Open^{1}	−4 (74-72-70-68=284)	Playoff	(Canada) Jim Rutledge, (United States) Mike Tschetter
4	4 May 1996	Cambridge Members Open (2)	−10 (69-71-69-69=278)	4 strokes	(South Korea) K. J. Choi, (South Korea) Lee Hae-woo, (South Korea) Park Nam-sin
5	28 Sep 1997	Elord Korea Open	−3 (72-75-67-71=285)	Playoff	(South Korea) Choi Gwang-soo, (United States) Andrew Pitts, (South Korea) Shin Yong-jin
6	17 May 1998	Astra Cup KPGA Championship	−8 (69-71-68=208) (Note: Shortened to 54 holes due to a committee error.)	2 strokes	(South Korea) Park Nam-sin
7	17 Apr 2005	Skyhill Jeju Open	−2 (73-73-69-71=286)	9 strokes	(South Korea) Hur In-hoi (a)
8	16 Oct 2005	Shinhan Donghae Open	−16 (69-65-67-71=272)	Playoff	(South Korea) K. J. Choi

^{1}Co-sanctioned by the Asia Golf Circuit

Korean Tour playoff record (4–1)

No.	Year	Tournament	Opponent(s)	Result
1	1993	Cambridge Members Open	(South Korea) Choi Sang-ho	Won with birdie on first extra hole
2	1994	Maekyung Open	(Canada) Jim Rutledge, (United States) Mike Tschetter	Won with par on second extra hole Rutledge eliminated by birdie on first hole
3	1996	Shinhan Donghae Open	(South Korea) Chung Joon	Lost to birdie on first extra hole
4	1997	Elord Korea Open	(South Korea) Choi Gwang-soo, (United States) Andrew Pitts, (South Korea) Shin Yong-jin	Won with birdie on second extra hole
5	2005	Shinhan Donghae Open	(South Korea) K. J. Choi	Won with birdie on first extra hole

=== Other wins (1) ===
No.	Date	Tournament	Winning score	Margin of victory	Runner-up
1	26 Oct 1996	Champion Series	−5 (69-70=139)	2 strokes	(South Korea) Park Nam-sin

=== Japan PGA Senior Tour wins (4) ===
No.	Date	Tournament	Winning score	Margin of victory	Runner(s)-up
1	21 Aug 2011	Fancl Classic	−16 (63-68-69=200)	5 strokes	(Thailand) Boonchu Ruangkit, (Japan) Gohei Sato
2	9 Oct 2011	Japan PGA Senior Championship	−13 (68-67-70-70=275)	3 strokes	(Japan) Katsuyoshi Tomori
3	2 Sep 2017	Komatsu Open	−15 (70-68-63=201)	Playoff	(Thailand) Prayad Marksaeng
4	14 Oct 2018	Trust Group Cup Sasebo Senior Open	−12 (68-64=132)	4 strokes	(Taiwan) Lu Chien-soon

== Results in major championships ==
Tournament	1997	1998	1999
The Open Championship	CUT		CUT

Did not play

CUT = missed the halfway cut
Note: Kim only played in The Open Championship.

== Team appearances ==
- Alfred Dunhill Cup (representing South Korea): 1997, 1998
