= 1997 Korean Tour =

Golf tour season

1997 Korean Tour season
- Duration: 16 April 1997 – 28 September 1997
- Number of official events: 11
- Most wins: (South Korea) K. J. Choi (3)
- Order of Merit: (South Korea) K. J. Choi
- Player of the Year: (South Korea) K. J. Choi
- Rookie of the Year: (South Korea) Mo Joong-kyung

The 1997 Korean Tour was the 20th season on the Korean Tour, the main professional golf tour in South Korea since it was formed in 1978.

== Schedule ==
The following table lists official events during the 1997 season.

Date	Tournament	Location	Purse (₩)	Winner (Note: The number in brackets after each winner's name is the number of Korean Tour events they had won up to and including that tournament. This information is only shown for Korean Tour members.)	OWGR points	Other tours (Note: AGC − Asia Golf Circuit.)	Notes
19 Apr	Cambridge Members Open	Gyeonggi	200,000,000	(South Korea) Park Nam-sin (13)	n/a		
4 May	Maekyung LG Fashion Open	Gyeonggi	US$400,000	(South Korea) Shin Yong-jin (3)	12	AGC	
25 May	Phantom Open	South Gyeongsang	150,000,000	(South Korea) K. J. Choi (3)	n/a		
1 Jun	Hyundai Motor Masters	Gyeonggi	US$500,000	(Wales) Ian Woosnam (n/a)	n/a		New tournament
8 Jun	SK Telecom Classic	South Gyeongsang	350,000,000	(South Korea) Park No-seok (1)	n/a		New tournament
22 Jun	Astra Cup KPGA Championship	Gyeonggi	150,000,000	(South Korea) K. J. Choi (4)	n/a		
28 Jun	Daily Sports Pocari Open	Gyeonggi	200,000,000	(South Korea) K. J. Choi (5)	n/a		
30 Aug	Superior Open	Gyeonggi	200,000,000	(South Korea) Park No-seok (2)	n/a		
7 Sep	Shinhan Donghae Open	Gyeonggi	360,000,000	(England) Ed Fryatt (n/a)	n/a		
14 Sep	Lacoste SBS Pro Golf Championship	Gyeonggi	140,000,000	(South Korea) Park Nam-sin (14)	n/a		
28 Sep	Elord Korea Open	Gyeonggi	US$400,000	(South Korea) Kim Jong-duck (5)	n/a		

== Order of Merit ==
The Order of Merit was based on prize money won during the season, calculated in South Korean won.

Position	Player	Prize money (₩)
1	(South Korea) K. J. Choi	159,063,640
2	(South Korea) Park Nam-sin	149,334,320
3	(South Korea) Park No-seok	139,863,958
4	(South Korea) Kim Jong-duck	126,256,288
5	(South Korea) Shin Yong-jin	125,146,380

== Awards ==
Award	Winner	Ref.
Player of the Year (Grand Prize Award)	(South Korea) K. J. Choi	
Rookie of the Year (Myeong-chul Award)	(South Korea) Mo Joong-kyung	
