= 2007 Korean Tour =

Golf tour season

2007 Korean Tour season
- Duration: 2 April 2007 – 1 November 2007
- Number of official events: 18
- Most wins: (South Korea) Kang Kyung-nam (3) (South Korea) Kim Kyung-tae (3)
- Order of Merit: (South Korea) Kim Kyung-tae
- Player of the Year: (South Korea) Kim Kyung-tae
- Rookie of the Year: (South Korea) Kim Kyung-tae

The 2007 Korean Tour, titled as the 2007 SBS Korean Tour for sponsorship reasons, was the 30th season on the Korean Tour, the main professional golf tour in South Korea since it was formed in 1978.

It was the third season of the tour under a title sponsorship agreement with Seoul Broadcasting System, that was announced in June 2004.

== Schedule ==
The following table lists official events during the 2007 season.

Date	Tournament	Location	Purse (₩)	Winner (Note: The number in brackets after each winner's name is the number of Korean Tour events they had won up to and including that tournament. This information is only shown for Korean Tour members.)	OWGR points	Other tours (Note: ASA − Asian Tour.)	Notes
29 Apr	SBS Tomato Savings Bank Open	Jeju	300,000,000	(South Korea) Kim Kyung-tae (3)	n/a		
6 May	GS Caltex Maekyung Open	Gyeonggi	600,000,000	(South Korea) Kim Kyung-tae (4)	14	ASA	
20 May	Xcanvas Open	Gyeonggi	400,000,000	(South Korea) Hong Soon-sang (1)	n/a		New tournament
27 May	SK Telecom Open	Gyeonggi	600,000,000	(South Korea) Bae Sang-moon (2)	14	ASA	
3 Jun	SBS Kumho Asiana Open	Gyeonggi	500,000,000	(South Korea) Park Nam-sin (20)	n/a		New tournament
17 Jun	SBS Ace Savings Bank Montvert Open	Gyeonggi	300,000,000	(South Korea) Bae Sung-chul (1)	n/a		New tournament
1 Jul	SBS Yeonwoo Heavenland Open	North Gyeongsang	400,000,000	(South Korea) Park Do-kyu (4)	n/a		New tournament
12 Jul	SBS Samsung Apple City Open	China	300,000,000	(South Korea) Kim Kyung-tae (5)	n/a		New tournament
24 Aug	SBS Korea Golf and Art Village KPGA Championship	Gyeonggi	500,000,000	(South Korea) Kim Chang-yoon (1)	n/a		
2 Sep	SBS Lake Hills Open	Jeju	300,000,000	(South Korea) Kang Kyung-nam (3)	n/a		New tournament
9 Sep	SBS Meritz Solmoro Open	Gyeonggi	300,000,000	(South Korea) Hwang Inn-choon (1)	n/a		
16 Sep	SBS Samsung Benest Open	Gyeonggi	600,000,000	(South Korea) Lee Seong-ho (1)	n/a		
23 Sep	SBS Eden Valley Ski Resort Open	South Gyeongsang	300,000,000	(South Korea) Kang Kyung-nam (4)	n/a		New tournament
7 Oct	Kolon-Hana Bank Korea Open	South Chungcheong	1,000,000,000	(Fiji) Vijay Singh (n/a)	14	ASA	
14 Oct	Shinhan Donghae Open	Gyeonggi	700,000,000	(South Korea) K. J. Choi (12)	n/a		
28 Oct	SBS Kumgang Ananti NongHyup Open	Gyeonggi	300,000,000	(South Korea) Kim Hyung-tae (2)	n/a		New tournament
11 Nov	SBS Hana Tour Championship	South Gyeongsang	300,000,000	(South Korea) Kang Kyung-nam (5)	n/a		
23 Nov	Dongbu Insurance Promy KPGA Invitational	North Gyeongsang	70,000,000	(South Korea) Lee Yong-hun (2)	n/a		New tournament

== Order of Merit ==
The Order of Merit was based on tournament results during the season, calculated using a points-based system.

Position	Player	Points
1	(South Korea) Kim Kyung-tae	6,320
2	(South Korea) Kang Kyung-nam	5,595
3	(South Korea) Kim Hyung-tae	2,855
4	(South Korea) Kim Chang-yoon	2,605
5	(South Korea) Hwang Inn-choon	2,395

== Awards ==
Award	Winner	Ref.
Player of the Year (Grand Prize Award)	(South Korea) Kim Kyung-tae	
Rookie of the Year (Myeong-chul Award)	(South Korea) Kim Kyung-tae	
