= 1999 Korean Tour =

Golf tour season

1999 Korean Tour season
- Duration: 29 April 1999 – 16 October 1999
- Number of official events: 7
- Most wins: (South Korea) K. J. Choi (2) (South Korea) Kang Wook-soon (2) (South Korea) Park Nam-sin (2)
- Order of Merit: (South Korea) Kang Wook-soon
- Player of the Year: (South Korea) Kang Wook-soon
- Rookie of the Year: (South Korea) Yang Yong-eun

The 1999 Korean Tour was the 22nd season on the Korean Tour, the main professional golf tour in South Korea since it was formed in 1978.

== Schedule ==
The following table lists official events during the 1999 season.

Date	Tournament	Location	Purse (₩)	Winner (Note: The number in brackets after each winner's name is the number of Korean Tour events they had won up to and including that tournament. This information is only shown for Korean Tour members.)	Other tours (Note: ASA − Asian PGA Tour.)	Notes
2 May	Maekyung Daks Open	Gyeonggi	US$250,000	(South Africa) James Kingston (n/a)	ASA	
6 Jun	SK Telecom Classic	Gyeonggi	200,000,000	(South Korea) Park Nam-sin (16)		
22 Aug	Bookyung Open	South Chungcheong	100,000,000	(South Korea) Kang Wook-soon (3)		New tournament
29 Aug	Lance Field KPGA Championship	North Chungcheong	100,000,000	(South Korea) Kang Wook-soon (4)		
12 Sep	SBS Pro Golf Championship	Gyeonggi	100,000,000	(South Korea) Park Nam-sin (17)		
19 Sep	Kolon Korea Open	Gyeonggi	350,000,000	(South Korea) K. J. Choi (6)	ASA	
16 Oct	KPGA Cup	Gyeonggi	100,000,000	(South Korea) K. J. Choi (7)		New tournament

== Order of Merit ==
The Order of Merit was based on prize money won during the season, calculated in South Korean won.

Position	Player	Prize money (₩)
1	(South Korea) Kang Wook-soon	79,898,357
2	(South Korea) Park Nam-sin	73,033,533
3	(South Korea) Shin Yong-jin	51,584,450
4	(South Korea) Choi Gwang-soo	40,618,100
5	(South Korea) Kim Wan-tae	29,454,650

== Awards ==
Award	Winner	Ref.
Player of the Year (Grand Prize Award)	(South Korea) Kang Wook-soon	
Rookie of the Year (Myeong-chul Award)	(South Korea) Yang Yong-eun	
