= 2001 Korean Tour =

Golf tour season

2001 Korean Tour season
- Duration: 26 April 2001 – 16 November 2001
- Number of official events: 12
- Most wins: (South Korea) Choi Gwang-soo (2) (South Korea) Shin Yong-jin (2) (South Korea) Charlie Wi (2)
- Order of Merit: (South Korea) Choi Gwang-soo
- Player of the Year: (South Korea) Kang Wook-soon
- Rookie of the Year: (South Korea) Kim Jong-myung

The 2001 Korean Tour was the 24th season on the Korean Tour, the main professional golf tour in South Korea since it was formed in 1978.

== Schedule ==
The following table lists official events during the 2001 season.

Date	Tournament	Location	Purse (₩)	Winner (Note: The number in brackets after each winner's name is the number of Korean Tour events they had won up to and including that tournament. This information is only shown for Korean Tour members.)	OWGR points	Other tours (Note: ASA − Asian PGA Tour.)	Notes
29 Apr	Maekyung LG Fashion Open	Gyeonggi	400,000,000	(South Korea) Choi Gwang-soo (11)	6	ASA	
20 May	SK Telecom Open	Gyeonggi	US$300,000	(South Korea) Charlie Wi (1)	6	ASA	
3 Jun	Pocari Energy Open	Gyeonggi	250,000,000	(South Korea) Hur Suk-ho (1)	n/a		
30 Jun	Maestro Open	Gyeonggi	200,000,000	(South Korea) Choi Gwang-soo (12)	n/a		New tournament
21 Jul	Chungcheong Open	South Chungcheong	200,000,000	(South Korea) Park Do-kyu (1)	n/a		
27 Jul	Sports Seoul Honam Open	South Jeolla	200,000,000	(South Korea) Kim Jong-myung (1)	n/a		
2 Sep	Lance Field KPGA Championship	Gangwon	300,000,000	(South Korea) Shin Yong-jin (4)	n/a		
16 Sep	Kolon Cup Korea Open	Gyeonggi	400,000,000	(South Korea) Kim Dae-sub (a) (2)	6	ASA	
23 Sep	Shinhan Donghae Open	Gyeonggi	400,000,000	(South Korea) Charlie Wi (2)	6	ASA	
3 Nov	Iksan Open	North Jeolla	200,000,000	(South Korea) Shin Yong-jin (5)	n/a		
10 Nov	Gyeongbuk Open	North Gyeongsang	200,000,000	(South Korea) Hwang Sung-ha (1)	n/a		New tournament
16 Nov	Gangwon Open	Gangwon	200,000,000	(South Korea) Bong Tae-ha (1)	n/a		New tournament

== Order of Merit ==
The Order of Merit was based on prize money won during the season, calculated in South Korean won.

Position	Player	Prize money (₩)
1	(South Korea) Choi Gwang-soo	157,959,842
2	(South Korea) Park Do-kyu	156,902,723
3	(South Korea) Charlie Wi	145,681,660
4	(South Korea) Kang Wook-soon	142,223,529
5	(South Korea) Shin Yong-jin	138,376,729

== Awards ==
Award	Winner	Ref.
Player of the Year (Grand Prize Award)	(South Korea) Kang Wook-soon	
Rookie of the Year (Myeong-chul Award)	(South Korea) Kim Jong-myung	
