= 2021 Korean Tour =

Golf tour season

2021 Korean Tour season
- Duration: 15 April 2021 – 7 November 2021
- Number of official events: 17
- Most wins: (South Korea) Park Sang-hyun (2)
- Order of Merit: (South Korea) Tom Kim
- Player of the Year: (South Korea) Tom Kim
- Rookie of the Year: (South Korea) Kim Dong-eun

The 2021 Korean Tour was the 44th season on the Korean Tour, the main professional golf tour in South Korea since it was formed in 1978.

== Schedule ==
The following table lists official events during the 2021 season.

Date	Tournament	Location	Purse (₩)	Winner (Note: The number in brackets after each winner's name is the number of Korean Tour events they had won up to and including that tournament. This information is only shown for Korean Tour members.)	OWGR points	Other tours (Note: JPN − Japan Golf Tour.)	Notes
18 Apr	DB Insurance Promy Open	Gangwon	700,000,000	(South Korea) Mun Do-yeob (2)	9		
2 May	KPGA Gunsan CC Open	North Jeolla	500,000,000	(South Korea) Kim Dong-eun (1)	9		
9 May	GS Caltex Maekyung Open	Gyeonggi	1,200,000,000	(South Korea) Hur In-hoi (4)	9		
30 May	KB Financial Liiv Championship	Gyeonggi	700,000,000	(South Korea) Moon Kyong-jun (2)	9		
6 Jun	Descente Korea Munsingwear Matchplay	South Gyeongsang	800,000,000	(South Korea) Lee Dong-min (2)	9		
13 Jun	SK Telecom Open	Jeju	1,200,000,000	(South Korea) Tom Kim (2)	9		
27 Jun	Kolon Korea Open	South Chungcheong	1,300,000,000	(Australia) Jun Seok Lee (1)	9		
11 Jul	Woosung Construction Aramir CC Busan Gyeongnam Open	South Gyeongsang	500,000,000	(South Korea) Park Sang-hyun (9)	9		
25 Jul	Yamaha Honors K Open	South Chungcheong	500,000,000	(South Korea) Kim Han-byeol (3)	9		New tournament
15 Aug	KPGA Championship	South Gyeongsang	1,000,000,000	(South Korea) Seo Yo-seop (2)	9		
5 Sep	Bizplay Electronic Times Open	South Jeolla	600,000,000	(South Korea) Kang Kyung-nam (12)	9		
12 Sep	Shinhan Donghae Open	Gyeonggi	1,400,000,000	(South Korea) Seo Yo-seop (3)	9	~~JPN~~	
19 Sep	DGB Financial Group Irvine Open	North Gyeongsang	500,000,000	(South Korea) Park Sang-hyun (10)	9		New tournament
3 Oct	Hyundai Insurance KJ Choi Invitational	Gyeonggi	1,000,000,000	(South Korea) Ham Jeong-woo (2)	9		
10 Oct	Genesis Championship	Gyeonggi	1,500,000,000	(South Korea) Lee Jae-kyeong (2)	9		
24 Oct	Hana Bank Invitational	Gyeonggi	1,000,000,000	(Canada) Richard T. Lee (3)	9		
7 Nov	LG Signature Players Championship	Gyeonggi	1,200,000,000	(South Korea) Kim Bi-o (6)	9		

== Order of Merit ==
The Order of Merit was titled as the Genesis Points and was based on tournament results during the season, calculated using a points-based system.

Position	Player	Points
1	(South Korea) Tom Kim	5,541
2	(South Korea) Park Sang-hyun	5,535
3	(South Korea) Ham Jeong-woo	4,119
4	(South Korea) Kim Han-byeol	3,838
5	(South Korea) Seo Yo-seop	3,815

== Awards ==
Award	Winner	Ref.
Player of the Year (Grand Prize Award)	(South Korea) Tom Kim	
Rookie of the Year (Myeong-chul Award)	(South Korea) Kim Dong-eun	
