= 2000 Korean Tour =

Golf tour season

2000 Korean Tour season
- Duration: 20 April 2000 – 19 November 2000
- Number of official events: 14
- Most wins: (South Korea) Choi Gwang-soo (3) (South Korea) Kang Wook-soon (3)
- Order of Merit: (South Korea) Choi Gwang-soo
- Player of the Year: (South Korea) Kang Wook-soon
- Rookie of the Year: (South Korea) Suk Jong-yul

The 2000 Korean Tour was the 23rd season on the Korean Tour, the main professional golf tour in South Korea since it was formed in 1978.

== Schedule ==
The following table lists official events during the 2000 season.

Date	Tournament	Location	Purse (₩)	Winner (Note: The number in brackets after each winner's name is the number of Korean Tour events they had won up to and including that tournament. This information is only shown for Korean Tour members.)	OWGR points	Other tours (Note: ASA − Asian PGA Tour.)	Notes
23 Apr	Honam Open	South Jeolla	200,000,000	(South Korea) Park Nam-sin (18)	n/a		
30 Apr	Maekyung LG Fashion Open	Gyeonggi	US$350,000	(South Korea) Kang Wook-soon (5)	6	ASA	
21 May	Lance Field KPGA Championship	South Gyeongsang	200,000,000	(South Korea) Park No-seok (3)	n/a		
28 May	SK Telecom Classic	Gyeonggi	350,000,000	(South Korea) Park Nam-sin (19)	n/a		
4 Jun	Hyundai Motor Masters	Gyeonggi	US$250,000	(South Korea) Choi Gwang-soo (8)	n/a		
11 Jun	Pocari Energy Open	Gyeonggi	200,000,000	(South Korea) Choi Gwang-soo (9)	n/a		
30 Jul	Bookyung Open	South Chungcheong	200,000,000	(South Korea) Choi Gwang-soo (10)	n/a		
27 Aug	Shinhan Donghae Open	South Gyeongsang	200,000,000	(South Korea) Yoo Jae-chul (1)	n/a		
3 Sep	Leading Investment & Securities Open	Gyeonggi	200,000,000	(South Korea) Kang Wook-soon (6)	n/a		New tournament
9 Sep	Chungcheong Open	South Chungcheong	200,000,000	(South Korea) Mo Joong-kyung (1)	n/a		New tournament
8 Oct	Kolon Cup Korea Open	Gyeonggi	400,000,000	(Thailand) Thongchai Jaidee (n/a)	6	ASA	
19 Oct	Daekyung Open	North Gyeongsang	200,000,000	(South Korea) Kang Wook-soon (7)	n/a		New tournament
12 Nov	Superior Open	South Gyeongsang	200,000,000	(South Korea) K. J. Choi (8)	n/a		
19 Nov	Iksan Open	North Jeolla	200,000,000	(South Korea) Kim Chang-min (1)	n/a		New tournament

== Order of Merit ==
The Order of Merit was based on prize money won during the season, calculated in South Korean won.

Position	Player	Prize money (₩)
1	(South Korea) Choi Gwang-soo	270,094,375
2	(South Korea) Kang Wook-soon	268,401,250
3	(South Korea) Park Nam-sin	180,355,800
4	(South Korea) Yoo Jae-chul	101,361,466
5	(South Korea) Mo Joong-kyung	101,042,089

== Awards ==
Award	Winner	Ref.
Player of the Year (Grand Prize Award)	(South Korea) Kang Wook-soon	
Rookie of the Year (Myeong-chul Award)	(South Korea) Suk Jong-yul	
