= 2026 Korean Tour =

Golf tour season

2026 Korean Tour season
- Duration: 16 April 2026 – 8 November 2026
- Number of official events: 19
- Most wins: (South Korea) Chan Choi (2) (South Korea) Jang Yu-bin (2)
- Order of Merit: (South Korea) Shin Sang-hun
- Rookie of the Year: (South Korea) Wang Jeung-hun

The 2026 Korean Tour is the 49th season on the Korean Tour, the main professional golf tour in South Korea since it was formed in 1978.

== Schedule ==
The following table lists official events during the 2026 season.

Date	Tournament	Location	Purse (₩)	Winner (Note: The number in brackets after each winner's name is the number of Korean Tour events they had won up to and including that tournament. This information is only shown for Korean Tour members.)	OWGR points	Other tours (Note: ASA − Asian Tour; EUR − European Tour; JPN − Japan Golf Tour.)	Notes
19 Apr	DB Insurance Promy Open	Gangwon	1,000,000,000	(South Korea) Lee Sang-yeop (2)	6.69		
26 Apr	Woori Financial Group Championship	Gyeonggi	1,500,000,000	(South Korea) Chan Choi (1)	6.85		
3 May	GS Caltex Maekyung Open	Jeju	1,300,000,000	(South Korea) Song Min-hyuk (1)	8.86	ASA	
10 May	KPGA Founders Cup	North Gyeongsang	700,000,000	(South Korea) Oh Seung-taek (1)	6.31		
17 May	KPGA Gyeongbuk Open	North Gyeongsang	700,000,000	(South Korea) Mun Do-yeob (6)	7.48		
24 May	Kolon Korea Open	South Chungcheong	1,400,000,000	(South Korea) Yang Ji-ho (3)	9.27	ASA	
7 Jun	KPGA Championship	South Gyeongsang	1,600,000,000	(South Korea) Moon Dong-hyun (1)	7.58		
14 Jun	KPGA Classic	North Gyeongsang	700,000,000	(South Korea) Jang Yu-bin (4)	6.75		
21 Jun	Hana Bank Invitational	Gangwon	1,300,000,000	(South Korea) Jang Yu-bin (5)	8.23		
28 Jun	KPGA Gunsan CC Open	North Jeolla	700,000,000	(South Korea) Jung Han-mil (1)	7.48		
23 Aug	Dong-A Membership Exchange Group Open	North Jeolla	700,000,000	(South Korea) Chan Choi (2)	6.52		
13 Sep	Shinhan Donghae Open	Gyeonggi	1,500,000,000	(Japan) Kosuke Sunagawa (n/a)	9.20	JPN	
20 Sep	Golfzon Open	North Gyeongsang	1,000,000,000	(South Korea) Shin Sang-hun (3)	6.09		
4 Oct	Hyundai Insurance KJ Choi Invitational	Gyeonggi	1,250,000,000	(South Korea) Wang Jeung-hun (1)	6.68		
11 Oct	AmazingCree Open	South Chungcheong	700,000,000	(South Korea) Lee Dai-han (2)	6.08		New tournament
18 Oct	The Charity Classic	Gyeonggi	1,000,000,000	(South Korea) Jung Chan-min (3)	5.63		
25 Oct	Genesis Championship	Gyeonggi	US$4,000,000	(Japan) Yuto Katsuragawa (n/a)	17.50	EUR	
1 Nov	Lexus Masters	South Gyeongsang	1,000,000,000	(South Korea) Bae Yong-jun (3)	5.74		
8 Nov	KPGA Tour Championship	Jeju	1,100,000,000	(South Korea) Jung Jae-hyun (1)	3.73		

== Order of Merit ==
The Order of Merit was titled as the Genesis Points and was based on tournament results during the season, calculated using a points-based system. The leading player on the Order of Merit earned status to play on the 2027 European Tour (DP World Tour).

Position	Player	Points	Status earned
1	(South Korea) Shin Sang-hun	5,487	Promoted to European Tour
2	(South Korea) Jung Chan-min	5,152	
3	(South Korea) Jang Yu-bin	5,137	
4	(South Korea) Song Min-hyuk	4,716	
5	(South Korea) Chan Choi	4,342	

== Awards ==
Award	Winner	Ref.
Player of the Year (Grand Prize Award)		
Rookie of the Year (Myeong-chul Award)	(South Korea) Wang Jeung-hun	
