= 1996 Korean Tour =

Golf tour season

1996 Korean Tour season
- Duration: 11 April 1996 – 21 September 1996
- Number of official events: 11
- Order of Merit: (South Korea) K. J. Choi
- Player of the Year: (South Korea) K. J. Choi
- Rookie of the Year: (South Korea) Lee Boo-young

The 1996 Korean Tour was the 19th season on the Korean Tour, the main professional golf tour in South Korea since it was formed in 1978.

== Schedule ==
The following table lists official events during the 1996 season.

Date	Tournament	Location	Purse (₩)	Winner (Note: The number in brackets after each winner's name is the number of Korean Tour events they had won up to and including that tournament. This information is only shown for Korean Tour members.)	OWGR points	Other tours (Note: AGC − Asia Golf Circuit; ASA − Asian PGA Tour.)	Notes
14 Apr	Maekyung LG Fashion Open	Gyeonggi	US$300,000	(South Korea) Park Nam-sin (12)	12	AGC	
4 May	Cambridge Members Open	Gyeonggi	160,000,000	(South Korea) Kim Jong-duck (4)	n/a		
11 May	Daily Sports Pocari Open	Gyeonggi	200,000,000	(South Korea) Kim Young-il (6)	n/a		
19 May	Phantom Open	South Gyeongsang	150,000,000	(South Korea) Lim Hyung-soo (1)	n/a		
15 Jun	Superior Open	Gyeonggi	120,000,000	(South Korea) Kim Sung-ho (1)	n/a		
23 Jun	Astra Cup KPGA Championship	Gyeonggi	150,000,000	(South Korea) Shin Yong-jin (2)	n/a		
27 Jul	Yeongnam Open	Yeongnam	160,000,000	(South Korea) Choi Sang-ho (42)	n/a		
25 Aug	Fila Open	Gyeonggi	US$300,000	(South Korea) Kwon Oh-chul (3)	n/a	ASA	New tournament
8 Sep	SBS Pro Golf Championship	Gyeonggi	140,000,000	(South Korea) Choi Gwang-soo (5)	n/a		
15 Sep	Elord Korea Open	Gyeonggi	US$400,000	(South Korea) K. J. Choi (2)	n/a		
21 Sep	Shinhan Donghae Open	Gyeonggi	320,000,000	(South Korea) Chung Joon (1)	n/a		

=== Unofficial events ===
The following events were sanctioned by the Korean Tour, but did not carry official money, nor were wins official.

Date	Tournament	Location	Purse (₩)	Winner	Notes
23 Mar	Parmax Invitational	South Gyeongsang	50,000,000	(South Korea) K. J. Choi	Limited-field event
30 Mar	Nassau Invitational	North Chungcheong	50,000,000	(South Korea) Lim Jin-han	Limited-field event
26 Oct	Champion Series	Gyeonggi	50,000,000	(South Korea) Kim Jong-duck	Limited-field event

== Order of Merit ==
The Order of Merit was based on prize money won during the season, calculated in South Korean won.

Position	Player	Prize money (₩)
1	(South Korea) K. J. Choi	147,271,700

== Awards ==
Award	Winner	Ref.
Player of the Year (Grand Prize Award)	(South Korea) K. J. Choi	
Rookie of the Year (Myeong-chul Award)	(South Korea) Lee Boo-young	
