= 2002 Korean Tour =

Golf tour season

2002 Korean Tour season
- Duration: 25 April 2002 – 16 November 2002
- Number of official events: 12
- Order of Merit: (South Korea) Kang Wook-soon
- Player of the Year: (South Korea) K. J. Choi
- Rookie of the Year: (South Korea) Kim Dae-sub

The 2002 Korean Tour was the 25th season on the Korean Tour, the main professional golf tour in South Korea since it was formed in 1978.

== Schedule ==
The following table lists official events during the 2002 season.

Date	Tournament	Location	Purse (₩)	Winner (Note: The number in brackets after each winner's name is the number of Korean Tour events they had won up to and including that tournament. This information is only shown for Korean Tour members.)	OWGR points	Other tours (Note: ASA − Asian PGA Tour.)	Notes
28 Apr	SK Telecom Open	Gyeonggi	500,000,000	(South Korea) Charlie Wi (3)	6	ASA	
4 May	Maekyung LG Fashion Open	Gyeonggi	500,000,000	(New Zealand) Eddie Lee (a) (n/a)	6	ASA	
12 May	Maestro Open	Gyeonggi	200,000,000	(South Korea) Park Do-kyu (2)	n/a		
19 May	Pocari Energy Open	Gyeonggi	250,000,000	(South Korea) Kang Wook-soon (8)	n/a		
26 Jul	Honam Open	South Jeolla	200,000,000	(South Korea) Shin Yong-jin (6)	n/a		
25 Aug	Bookyung Open	South Chungcheong	200,000,000	(South Korea) Choi Gwang-soo (13)	n/a		
1 Sep	Shinhan Donghae Open	Gyeonggi	500,000,000	(South Korea) Hur Suk-ho (2)	6	ASA	
8 Sep	Kolon Cup Korea Open	Gyeonggi	500,000,000	(Spain) Sergio García (n/a)	14	ASA	
15 Sep	Samsung Securities KPGA Championship	Gangwon	550,000,000	(South Korea) Kim Dae-sub (3)	n/a		
3 Nov	SBS Oriental Fire Cup	Gyeonggi	150,000,000	(South Korea) Yang Yong-eun (1)	n/a		New tournament
10 Nov	KTRD Open	Gyeonggi	300,000,000	(South Korea) Mo Joong-kyung (2)	n/a		New tournament
16 Nov	Iksan Open	North Jeolla	200,000,000	(South Korea) Suk Jong-yul (1)	n/a		

== Order of Merit ==
The Order of Merit was based on prize money won during the season, calculated in South Korean won.

Position	Player	Prize money (₩)
1	(South Korea) Kang Wook-soon	204,166,667
2	(South Korea) Kim Dae-sub	176,168,333
3	(South Korea) Choi Gwang-soo	168,295,000
4	(South Korea) Park Nam-sin	139,305,667
5	(South Korea) Park Do-kyu	136,224,750

== Awards ==
Award	Winner	Ref.
Player of the Year (Grand Prize Award)	(South Korea) K. J. Choi	
Rookie of the Year (Myeong-chul Award)	(South Korea) Kim Dae-sub	
