= Korea Open (golf) =

Kolon Korea Open
Tournament information
- Location: Cheonan, South Korea
- Established: 1958
- Course: Woo Jeong Hills Country Club
- Par: 71
- Length: 7,326 yards (6,699 m)
- Tours: Asian Tour; Korean Tour; Asia Golf Circuit; OneAsia Tour
- Format: Stroke play
- Prize fund: ₩1,400,000,000
- Month played: June

Tournament record score
- Aggregate: 265 Sergio García (2002)
- To par: −23 as above

Current champion
- (South Korea) Yang Ji-ho

Final champion
- Location in South Korea

The Kolon Korea Open, as it is currently known for sponsorship reasons, is a men's professional golf tournament that has been held annually in South Korea since 1958.

The Korea Open was an event on the Asia Golf Circuit from 1970 until 1981. The Maekyung Open was founded in 1982 to replace it on the circuit, which allowed rescheduling of the Korea Open to later in the year. It became a stop on the Asian Tour from 1998 to 2008, except for 2005, and then part of the OneAsia Tour schedule from 2009 to 2017, before returning to the Asian Tour in 2018.

In 2019, the total purse is KRW1,200,000,000 with KRW300,000,000 to the winner. The event has been played at Woo Jeong Hills since 2003.

In 2017, the winner and runner-up were eligible to compete in the 2017 Open Championship. Neither the winner, Chang Yi-keun, nor runner-up, Kim Gi-whan, had already qualified for the Open Championship so both took their places at the event. It was the first time either had played in the event. In 2018 the tournament became part of the Open Qualifying Series with two places available for the leading players not already qualified for the Open Championship.

== Winners ==
Year	Tour(s) (Note: AGC − Asia Golf Circuit; ASA − Asian Tour; KOR − Korean Tour; ONE − OneAsia Tour.)	Winner	Score	To par	Margin of victory	Runner(s)-up	Venue
Kolon Korea Open
2026	ASA, KOR	(South Korea) Yang Ji-ho	275	−9	4 strokes	(Sweden) Charlie Lindh	Woo Jeong Hills
2025	ASA, KOR	(Thailand) Sadom Kaewkanjana	277	−7	2 strokes	(Thailand) Poom Saksansin	Woo Jeong Hills
2024	ASA, KOR	(South Korea) Kim Min-kyu (2)	273	−11	3 strokes	(South Korea) Song Young-han	Woo Jeong Hills
2023	ASA, KOR	(United States) Seungsu Han	278	−6	6 strokes	(South Korea) Kang Kyung-nam	Woo Jeong Hills
2022	ASA, KOR	(South Korea) Kim Min-kyu	280	−4	Playoff	(South Korea) Cho Min-gyu	Woo Jeong Hills
2021	KOR	(Australia) Jun Seok Lee	276	−8	1 stroke	(South Korea) Park Eun-shin	Woo Jeong Hills
2020	ASA, KOR	Cancelled due to the COVID-19 pandemic					
2019	ASA, KOR	(Thailand) Jazz Janewattananond	278	−6	1 stroke	(South Korea) Hwang Inn-choon	Woo Jeong Hills
2018	ASA, KOR	(South Korea) Choi Min-chel	272	−12	2 strokes	(South Korea) Park Sang-hyun	Woo Jeong Hills
2017	KOR, ONE	(South Korea) Chang Yi-keun	277	−7	Playoff	(South Korea) Kim Gi-whan	Woo Jeong Hills
2016	KOR, ONE	(South Korea) Lee Kyoung-hoon (2)	268	−16	3 strokes	(South Korea) Choi Jin-ho	Woo Jeong Hills
2015	KOR, ONE	(South Korea) Lee Kyoung-hoon	271	−13	4 strokes	(South Korea) Kim Meen-whee	Woo Jeong Hills
2014	KOR, ONE	(South Korea) Kim Seung-hyuk	282	−2	2 strokes	(South Korea) Noh Seung-yul	Woo Jeong Hills
2013	KOR, ONE	(South Korea) Kang Sung-hoon	280	−4	1 stroke	(South Korea) Kim Hyung-tae (South Korea) Lee Chang-woo (a) (South Korea) Lee Sang-hee (Northern Ireland) Rory McIlroy (South Korea) Mo Joong-kyung	Woo Jeong Hills
2012	KOR, ONE	(South Korea) Kim Dae-sub (3)	279	−5	2 strokes	(South Korea) Kim Dae-hyun	Woo Jeong Hills
2011	KOR, ONE	(United States) Rickie Fowler	268	−16	6 strokes	(Northern Ireland) Rory McIlroy	Woo Jeong Hills
2010	KOR, ONE	(South Korea) Yang Yong-eun (2)	280	−4	2 strokes	(South Korea) Choi Ho-sung (South Korea) Kim Bi-o	Woo Jeong Hills
Kolon-Hana Bank Korea Open
2009	KOR, ONE	(South Korea) Bae Sang-moon (2)	274	−10	1 stroke	(South Korea) Kim Dae-sub	Woo Jeong Hills
2008	ASA, KOR	(South Korea) Bae Sang-moon	273	−11	1 stroke	(England) Ian Poulter	Woo Jeong Hills
2007	ASA, KOR	(Fiji) Vijay Singh	278	−6	1 stroke	(South Korea) Kim Kyung-tae (South Korea) Yang Yong-eun	Woo Jeong Hills
2006	ASA, KOR	(South Korea) Yang Yong-eun	270	−14	3 strokes	(South Korea) Kang Ji-man	Woo Jeong Hills
2005	KOR	(South Korea) Choi Gwang-soo	282	−2	Playoff	(South Korea) Hur Won-kyung (a)	Woo Jeong Hills
Kolon Korea Open
2004	ASA, KOR	(United States) Edward Loar	286	−2	3 strokes	(Scotland) Simon Yates	Woo Jeong Hills
2003	ASA, KOR	(United States) John Daly	282	−6	1 stroke	(Thailand) Thaworn Wiratchant	Woo Jeong Hills
Kolon Cup Korea Open
2002	ASA, KOR	(Spain) Sergio García	265	−23	3 strokes	(South Korea) Kang Wook-soon	Hanyang
2001	ASA, KOR	(South Korea) Kim Dae-sub (a) (2)	272	−16	3 strokes	(South Korea) Park Do-kyu	Hanyang
2000	ASA, KOR	(Thailand) Thongchai Jaidee	278	−10	1 stroke	(South Africa) Craig Kamps	Hanyang
Kolon Korea Open
1999	ASA, KOR	(South Korea) K. J. Choi (2)	278	−10	1 stroke	(Myanmar) Kyi Hla Han	Hanyang
Kolon Sports Korea Open
1998	ASA, KOR	(South Korea) Kim Dae-sub (a)	278	−10	5 strokes	(South Korea) Choi Sang-ho (United States) Fran Quinn	Hanyang
Elord Korea Open
1997	KOR	(South Korea) Kim Jong-duck	285	−3	Playoff	(South Korea) Choi Gwang-soo (United States) Andrew Pitts (South Korea) Shin Yong-jin	Hanyang
1996	KOR	(South Korea) K. J. Choi	279	−9	1 stroke	(South Korea) Kim Jong-duck	Hanyang
Korea Open
1995	KOR	(South Korea) Kwon Young-suk	282	−6	1 stroke	(South Korea) Choi Gwang-soo (South Korea) Choi Sang-ho	New Korea
1994	KOR	(United States) Mike Cunning	282	−6	2 strokes	(South Korea) Kim Jong-il	Hanyang
1993	KOR	(South Korea) Han Young-keun	282	−6	Playoff	(South Korea) Kwak Heung-soo	Hanyang
1992	KOR	(Japan) Shigeru Noguchi	209	−7	3 strokes	(South Korea) Cho Chul-sang (South Korea) Lim Jin-han	Hanyang
1991	KOR	(United States) Scott Hoch (2)	279				Hanyang
1990	KOR	(United States) Scott Hoch	278				Hanyang
1989		(South Korea) Cho Chul-sang	210				New Korea
1988		(South Korea) Kwak Yuh-yun	282				Suwon
1987		(South Korea) Choi Youn-soo	283				Hansung
1986		(South Korea) Choi Yoon-soo	281				New Korea
1985		(South Korea) Cho Ho-sang	285				Gwanak
1984		(South Korea) Yeom Se-woon	284				Seoul
1983		(South Korea) Choi Sang-ho	287				Gwanak
1982		(South Korea) Choi Yoon-Soo	277	−11			Namseoul
1981	AGC	(Taiwan) Chen Tze-ming (2)	285	−3	1 stroke	(Taiwan) Hsu Chi-san	Seoul
1980	AGC	(Taiwan) Chen Tze-ming	214 (Note: Shortened to 54 holes due to weather.)	−4	1 stroke	(South Korea) Choi Sang-ho (Japan) Hisao Inoue (South Korea) Kim Suk-bong (South Korea) Park Jung-woong (South Korea) Yeom Se-woon	Gwanak
1979	AGC	(Taiwan) Shen Chung-shyan	289	+1	2 strokes	(Taiwan) Chen Tze-ming	Seoul
1978	AGC	(South Korea) Kim Seung-hack (2)	277	−11	6 strokes	(Taiwan) Hsu Sheng-san	Namseoul
1977	AGC	(Taiwan) Ho Ming-chung	285	−3	1 stroke	(Taiwan) Hsieh Min-Nan	Taeneung
1976	AGC	(Japan) Katsunari Takahashi	214	−2	Playoff	(Myanmar) Mya Aye	Anyang
1975	AGC	(Taiwan) Kuo Chie-Hsiung	284	−4	Playoff	(United States) Art Russell	New Korea
1974	AGC	(South Korea) Cho Tae-woon	286	−2	4 strokes	(Philippines) Ben Arda (South Korea) Cho Am-kil (Taiwan) Kuo Chie-Hsiung	Taeneung
1973	AGC	(South Korea) Kim Seung-hack	282	−6	1 stroke	(Philippines) Ireneo Legaspi	Taeneung
1972	AGC	(South Korea) Han Chang-sang (7)	276	−12	6 strokes	(Australia) Graham Marsh	Seoul
1971	AGC	(South Korea) Han Chang-sang (6)	281	−7	4 strokes	(Taiwan) Chang Chung-fa (Taiwan) Lu Liang-Huan	Seoul
1970	AGC	(South Korea) Han Chang-sang (5)	289	+1	3 strokes	(Philippines) Ben Arda	Seoul
1969		(Taiwan) Hsieh Yung-yo (3)	286	−2			Seoul
1968		(Taiwan) Kin-Chung Chan	283	−5			Seoul
1967		(South Korea) Han Chang-sang (4)	281	−7			Seoul
1966		(South Korea) Han Chang-sang (3)	295	+7			Seoul
1965		(South Korea) Han Chang-sang (2)	288	E			Seoul
1964		(South Korea) Han Chang-sang	294	+6			Seoul
1963		(Taiwan) Hsieh Yung-yo (2)	287	−1			Seoul
1962		(Japan) Torakichi Nakamura	284	−4			Seoul
1961		(Taiwan) Hsieh Yung-yo	293	+5			Seoul
1960		(United States) Orville Moody (3)	288	E			Seoul
1959		(United States) Orville Moody (2)	301	+13			Seoul
1958		(United States) Orville Moody	306	+18			Seoul

== See also ==
- Open golf tournament
