= Hur Suk-ho =

South Korean golfer (born 1973)

Personal information
- Nationality: South Korea
- Born: 20 August 1973 (age 53)
- Height: 1.75 m (5 ft 9 in)
- Weight: 75 kg (165 lb; 11.8 st)

Career
- Sport: Golf
- College: Chae Yoog University
- Turned professional: 1995
- Former tours: Japan Golf Tour; Asian Tour; Korean Tour; Japan Challenge Tour
- Professional wins: 13
- Highest ranking: 65 (12 June 2005)

Number of wins by tour
- Japan Golf Tour: 8
- Asian Tour: 1
- Other: 4

Best results in major championships
- Masters Tournament: DNP
- PGA Championship: T58: 2004
- U.S. Open: DNP
- The Open Championship: T11: 2006

Achievements and awards
- Japan Challenge Tour money list winner: 2001
- Korean Tour Player of the Year: 2005

Hur Suk-ho (Korean: 허석호; born 20 August 1973), commonly known as S. K. Ho in English, is a South Korean professional golfer who plays mainly on the Japan Golf Tour.

== Career ==
Hur was born in Seoul, South Korea. He attended Chae Yoog University and turned pro in 1995. He joined the Japan Golf Tour in 2001, having topped the money list on the Japan Challenge Tour in 2001. He has eight wins in total on the Japan Golf Tour. He has made several appearances in major championships and World Golf Championships events. He also won the Korean Tour Order of Merit in 2005.

== Professional wins (13) ==
=== Japan Golf Tour wins (8) ===
Legend
Japan majors (3)
Other Japan Golf Tour (5)

| No. | Date | Tournament | Winning score | Margin of victory | Runner(s)-up |
|---|---|---|---|---|---|
| 1 | 14 Jul 2002 | Juken Sangyo Open Hiroshima | −14 (64-70-71-69=274) | 3 strokes | (Japan) Mamo Osanai |
| 2 | 16 May 2004 | Japan PGA Championship | −14 (66-68-68=202) (Note: Shortened to 54 holes due to weather.) | 1 stroke | (Japan) Keiichiro Fukabori |
| 3 | 4 Jul 2004 | Japan Golf Tour Championship Shishido Hills Cup | −5 (70-74-67-68=279) | Playoff | (Japan) Tomohiro Kondo |
| 4 | 15 May 2005 | Japan PGA Championship (2) | −16 (68-68-67-69=272) | 2 strokes | (Japan) Hideto Tanihara |
| 5 | 5 Jun 2005 | JCB Classic Sendai | −19 (63-67-66-69=265) | 1 stroke | (Japan) Shinichi Yokota |
| 6 | 25 Jun 2006 | Gateway to The Open Mizuno Open | −14 (68-69-66-71=274) | 3 strokes | (Japan) Tatsuhiko Ichihara, (New Zealand) David Smail |
| 7 | 27 Apr 2008 | Tsuruya Open | −12 (70-69-65-68=272) | 1 stroke | (South Korea) Kim Kyung-tae |
| 8 | 9 Nov 2008 | The Championship by Lexus | −15 (66-68-65-70=269) | 5 strokes | (Japan) Kiyoshi Miyazato |

Japan Golf Tour playoff record (1–2)

| No. | Year | Tournament | Opponent(s) | Result |
|---|---|---|---|---|
| 1 | 2004 | Japan Golf Tour Championship Shishido Hills Cup | (Japan) Tomohiro Kondo | Won with par on second extra hole |
| 2 | 2006 | The Golf Tournament in Omaezaki | (Japan) Tomohiro Kondo, (Japan) Toru Taniguchi | Taniguchi won with birdie on third extra hole Kondo eliminated by birdie on second hole |
| 3 | 2013 | Mynavi ABC Championship | (Japan) Yuta Ikeda | Lost to par on first extra hole |

=== Asian PGA Tour wins (1) ===
| No. | Date | Tournament | Winning score | Margin of victory | Runner-up |
|---|---|---|---|---|---|
| 1 | 1 Sep 2002 | Shinhan Donghae Open^{1} | −12 (65-67-72-72=276) | Playoff | (Scotland) Simon Yates |

^{1}Co-sanctioned by the Korean Tour

Asian PGA Tour playoff record (1–0)

| No. | Year | Tournament | Opponent | Result |
|---|---|---|---|---|
| 1 | 2002 | Shinhan Donghae Open | (Scotland) Simon Yates | Won with birdie on second extra hole |

=== Korean Tour wins (2) ===
| No. | Date | Tournament | Winning score | Margin of victory | Runner(s)-up |
|---|---|---|---|---|---|
| 1 | 3 Jun 2001 | Pocari Energy Open | −15 (66-69-74-64=273) | 1 stroke | (South Korea) Hwang Sung-ha, (South Korea) Shin Yong-jin |
| 2 | 1 Sep 2002 | Shinhan Donghae Open^{1} | −12 (65-67-72-72=276) | Playoff | (Scotland) Simon Yates |

^{1}Co-sanctioned by the Asian PGA Tour

Korean Tour playoff record (1–0)

| No. | Year | Tournament | Opponent | Result |
|---|---|---|---|---|
| 1 | 2002 | Shinhan Donghae Open | (Scotland) Simon Yates | Won with birdie on second extra hole |

=== Japan Challenge Tour wins (3) ===
| No. | Date | Tournament | Winning score | Margin of victory | Runner(s)-up |
|---|---|---|---|---|---|
| 1 | 13 Apr 2001 | JGTO iiyama Challenge 1 | −9 (68-67=135) | 1 stroke | (Japan) Hisashi Sawada |
| 2 | 25 May 2001 | JGTO iiyama Challenge 2 | −10 (66-68=134) | 1 stroke | (Japan) Norihiko Nakata |
| 3 | 5 Jul 2001 | Kourakuen Cup (2nd) | −5 (67) | Playoff | (Japan) Tadahisa Inoue, (Japan) Hiroo Okamo |

== Results in major championships ==
| Tournament | 2003 | 2004 | 2005 | 2006 |
|---|---|---|---|---|
| The Open Championship | T28 | CUT | T74 | T11 |
| PGA Championship | | T58 | CUT | CUT |

Did not play

CUT = missed the half-way cut
"T" = tied
Note: Hur never played in the Masters Tournament or the U.S. Open.

== Results in World Golf Championships ==
| Tournament | 2004 | 2005 |
|---|---|---|
| Match Play | | |
| Championship | 53 | T64 |
| Invitational | T27 | |

Did not play

"T" = Tied

== Team appearances ==
- World Cup (representing South Korea): 2002, 2003, 2006
- Royal Trophy (representing Asia): 2006, 2007, 2009 (winners)
