= Kim Dae-sub =

South Korean golfer

Personal information
- Nationality: South Korea
- Born: 30 June 1981 (age 45)

Career
- Sport: Golf
- Turned professional: 2001
- Current tour: Korean Tour
- Professional wins: 10

Number of wins by tour
- Asian Tour: 2
- Other: 8

Achievements and awards
- Korean Tour Rookie of the Year: 2002

Kim Dae-sub (Korean: 김대섭; born 30 June 1981) is a South Korean professional golfer.

Kim played on the Korean Tour where he won nine times. He won the Korea Open as a 17-year-old amateur in 1998 and won it again in 2001 at which point he turned professional. He won the event a third time in 2012.

== Professional wins (10) ==
=== Asian PGA Tour wins (2) ===
No.	Date	Tournament	Winning score	Margin of victory	Runner(s)-up
1	20 Sep 1998	Kolon Sports Korea Open^{1} (as an amateur)	−10 (76-70-67-65=278)	5 strokes	(South Korea) Choi Sang-ho, (United States) Fran Quinn
2	16 Sep 2001	Kolon Cup Korea Open^{1} (2) (as an amateur)	−16 (66-67-70-69=272)	3 strokes	(South Korea) Park Do-kyu

^{1}Co-sanctioned by the Korean Tour

=== OneAsia Tour wins (1) ===
No.	Date	Tournament	Winning score	Margin of victory	Runner-up
1	21 Oct 2012	Kolon Korea Open^{1}	−5 (72-68-70-69=279)	2 strokes	(South Korea) Kim Dae-hyun

^{1}Co-sanctioned by the Korean Tour

=== Korean Tour wins (10) ===
No.	Date	Tournament	Winning score	Margin of victory	Runner(s)-up
1	20 Sep 1998	Kolon Sports Korea Open^{1} (as an amateur)	−10 (76-70-67-65=278)	5 strokes	(South Korea) Choi Sang-ho, (United States) Fran Quinn
2	16 Sep 2001	Kolon Cup Korea Open^{1} (2) (as an amateur)	−16 (66-67-70-69=272)	3 strokes	(South Korea) Park Do-kyu
3	15 Sep 2002	Samsung Securities KPGA Championship	−13 (70-68-67-70=275)	2 strokes	(South Korea) Park Nam-sin
4	22 Jun 2003	Pocari Energy Open	−19 (64-66-67-72=269)	4 strokes	(South Korea) Chung Joon, (South Korea) Shin Yong-jin
5	6 Nov 2005	Dongbu Insurance Promy KPGA Championship (2)	−18 (67-68-66-69=270)	2 strokes	(South Korea) Chung Joon
6	21 Sep 2008	KEB Invitational (2nd)	−8 (66-68-70-76=280)	Playoff	(South Korea) Kim Dae-hyun
7	20 Sep 2009	SBS Meritz Solmoro Open	−6 (71-68-71-68=278)	1 stroke	(South Korea) Kim Dae-hyun
8	17 Oct 2010	Hanyang Sujain-Pine Beach Open	−17 (65-68-68-70=271)	2 strokes	(South Korea) Kim Do-hoon
9	16 Sep 2012	Dongbu Insurance Promy Open	−15 (68-68-67-70=273)	4 strokes	(South Korea) Kim Do-hoon
10	21 Oct 2012	Kolon Korea Open^{2} (3)	−5 (72-68-70-69=279)	2 strokes	(South Korea) Kim Dae-hyun

^{1}Co-sanctioned by the Asian PGA Tour
^{2}Co-sanctioned by the OneAsia Tour

Korean Tour playoff record (1–1)

No.	Year	Tournament	Opponent(s)	Result
1	2008	KEB Invitational (2nd)	(South Korea) Kim Dae-hyun	Won with birdie on first extra hole
2	2009	SBS Johnnie Walker Blue Label Open	(South Korea) Bae Sang-moon, (South Korea) Hwang Inn-choon, (South Korea) Maeng Dong-seop	Maeng won with birdie on first extra hole

== Team appearances ==
Amateur

- Eisenhower Trophy (representing South Korea): 1998, 2000

Professional

- World Cup (representing South Korea): 2004
