= Korean Tour =

Professional golf tour in South Korea

- Current season, competition or edition: 2026 Korean Tour
- Formerly: SBS Korean Tour
- Sport: Golf
- Founded: 1978; 48 years ago
- First season: 1978; 48 years ago
- Countries: Based in South Korea (Note: Schedules have also included events in China and Japan.)
- Most titles: Order of Merit titles: (South Korea) Choi Sang-ho (9); Tournament wins: (South Korea) Choi Sang-ho (43)
- Website: www.kpga.co.kr

The Korean Tour is a men's professional golf tour run by the Korea Professional Golfers' Association (KPGA) of South Korea. In 2011, it had total prize money of about US$14 million.

== History ==
Professional golf in Korea dates back to the mid 20th century. The Korean Professional Golf Championship and the Korean Open were launched in 1958 and the KPGA was founded in 1963. Various other tournaments were created over the following decades.

The KPGA's tours serve as feeders for richer tours around the world. Substantial numbers of Korean golfers have played on the Asian Tour and the Japan Golf Tour, and a few have made it onto the PGA Tour or the European Tour. Notable examples include Yang Yong-eun, who was the first Korean to win a men's major golf championship, and K. J. Choi, the first Korean-born PGA Tour winner whose most notable win was the 2011 Players Championship.

In June 2004, the tour signed a title sponsorship agreement with Seoul Broadcasting System, being renamed as the SBS Korean Tour. The agreement was reported to be worth ₩15,000,000,000 over five years.

In December 2022, it was announced by the European Tour that the KPGA had extended their partnership with them and the PGA Tour. As part of the expansion, the leading player on the Korean Tour Order of Merit was given status onto the European Tour for the following season. In 2023, the number of players earning European Tour cards was increased to three.

== Main tour ==
In 2011, there were 17 events on the main tour. All these tournament have prize funds of at least 300 million won (approximately US$300,000). Four have prize funds of 1 billion won (US$1 million) while the Ballantine's Championship has a prize fund of 2.2 million euros (approximately US$3.1 million). Total prize money for the tour is approximately 12 billion won (US$12 million).

Until 2011, regular Korean Tour events did not carry Official World Golf Ranking points. The first regular tournament to carry World Rankings Points was the 2011 Twayair Open. Korean Tour events carry a minimum of nine OWGR points for the winner, increased from six in 2016.

=== Other KPGA tours ===
The KPGA launched a developmental tour in 1999. In 2007 there are two developmental tours. Both of them consist of two-day, 36-hole tournaments, and the dates of the tours do not clash. The Bear River Tour consists of ten tournaments with prize funds of 60 million won (US$60,000) each, and the SBS Golf Calloway Tour has eight tournaments with prize funds of 40 million won (US$40,000) each.

The KPGA also runs a senior tour and a series of events for teaching pros. The Korean Senior Open Golf Championship was launched in 1996.

Women's professional golf has a high profile in South Korea, due to the immense international success of Korean women golfers such as Pak Se-ri since the mid-1990s. There is a separate LPGA of Korea Tour for women.

== Order of Merit winners ==
Season	Winner	Points
2026	(South Korea) Shin Sang-hun	5,487
2025	(South Korea) Ok Tae-hoon	7,204
2024	(South Korea) Jang Yu-bin	8,002
2023	(South Korea) Ham Jeong-woo	6,062
2022	(South Korea) Kim Yeong-su	5,915
2021	(South Korea) Tom Kim	5,541
2020	(South Korea) Kim Tae-hoon	3,252
2019	(South Korea) Moon Kyong-jun	4,126
2018	(South Korea) Lee Hyung-joon	4,662
2017	(South Korea) Choi Jin-ho (2)	5,246
2016	(South Korea) Choi Jin-ho	4,009
2015	(South Korea) Lee Tae-hee	2,190
2014	(South Korea) Kim Seung-hyuk	3,362
2013	(South Korea) Ryu Hyun-woo	3,555
2012	(South Korea) Lee Sang-hee	2,995
2011	(South Korea) Hong Soon-sang	3,160
2010	(South Korea) Kim Bi-o	3,770
2009	(South Korea) Bae Sang-moon	4,770
2008	(South Korea) Kim Hyung-sung	6,765
2007	(South Korea) Kim Kyung-tae	6,320
Season	Winner	Prize money (₩)
2006	(South Korea) Kang Kyung-nam	302,623,333
2005	(South Korea) Choi Gwang-soo (4)	265,434,825
2004	(South Korea) Jang Ik-jae	143,080,000
2003	(South Korea) Shin Yong-jin	207,783,810
2002	(South Korea) Kang Wook-soon (2)	204,166,667
2001	(South Korea) Choi Gwang-soo (3)	157,959,842
2000	(South Korea) Choi Gwang-soo (2)	270,094,375
1999	(South Korea) Kang Wook-soon	79,898,357
1998	(South Korea) Choi Gwang-soo	83,234,470
1997	(South Korea) K. J. Choi (2)	159,063,640
1996	(South Korea) K. J. Choi	147,271,700
1995	(South Korea) Choi Sang-ho (9)	
1994	(South Korea) Choi Sang-ho (8)	
1993	(South Korea) Park Nam-sin (3)	
1992	(South Korea) Choi Sang-ho (7)	
1991	(South Korea) Choi Sang-ho (6)	
1990	(South Korea) Lee Kang-sun	
1989	(South Korea) Park Nam-sin (2)	
1988	(South Korea) Park Nam-sin	
1987	(South Korea) Choi Youn-soo	
1986	(South Korea) Choi Sang-ho (5)	
1985	(South Korea) Choi Sang-ho (4)	
1984	(South Korea) Cho Ho-sang	
1983	(South Korea) Choi Sang-ho (3)	
1982	(South Korea) Han Chang-sang	
1981	(South Korea) Choi Sang-ho (2)	
1980	(South Korea) Kim Seung-hack (2)	
1979	(South Korea) Kim Seung-hack	
1978	(South Korea) Choi Sang-ho	

=== Multiple winners ===
Rank	Player	Wins	Years won
1	(South Korea) Choi Sang-ho	9	1978, 1981, 1983, 1985, 1986, 1991, 1992, 1994, 1995
T2	(South Korea) Choi Gwang-soo	4	1998, 2000, 2001, 2005
T2	(South Korea) K. J. Choi	4	1996, 1997, 2002, 2003
4	(South Korea) Kang Wook-soon	3	1999, 2000, 2001
T5	(South Korea) Choi Jin-ho	2	2016, 2017
T5	(South Korea) Kim Seung-hack	2	1979, 1980
T5	(South Korea) Park Nam-sin	2	1988, 1993
T5	(South Korea) Yang Yong-eun	2	2004, 2006

== Awards ==
Season	Player of the Year	Rookie of the Year
2026		(South Korea) Wang Jeung-hun
2025	(South Korea) Ok Tae-hoon	(Thailand) Sadom Kaewkanjana
2024	(South Korea) Jang Yu-bin	(South Korea) Song Min-hyuk
2023	(South Korea) Ham Jeong-woo	(South Korea) Park Sung-joon
2022	(South Korea) Kim Yeong-su	(South Korea) Bae Yong-jun
2021	(South Korea) Tom Kim	(South Korea) Kim Dong-eun
2020	(South Korea) Kim Tae-hoon	(Australia) Won Joon Lee
2019	(South Korea) Moon Kyong-jun	(South Korea) Lee Jae-kyeong
2018	(South Korea) Lee Hyung-joon	(South Korea) Ham Jeong-woo
2017	(South Korea) Choi Jin-ho (2)	(South Korea) Chang Yi-keun
2016	(South Korea) Choi Jin-ho	(South Korea) Kim Tae-woo
2015	(South Korea) Lee Tae-hee	(South Korea) Lee Soo-min
2014	(South Korea) Kim Seung-hyuk	(South Korea) Park Il-hwan
2013	(South Korea) Ryu Hyun-woo	(South Korea) Song Young-han
2012	(South Korea) Lee Sang-hee	(South Korea) Kim Meen-whee
2011	(South Korea) Hong Soon-sang	(United States) John Huh
2010	(South Korea) Kim Bi-o	(South Korea) Kim Bi-o
2009	(South Korea) Bae Sang-moon	(South Korea) Kim Do-hoon
2008	(South Korea) Kim Hyung-sung	(South Korea) Kang Sung-hoon
2007	(South Korea) Kim Kyung-tae	(South Korea) Kim Kyung-tae
2006	(South Korea) Yang Yong-eun (2)	(South Korea) Choi Jin-ho
2005	(South Korea) Hur Suk-ho	(South Korea) Kang Kyung-nam
2004	(South Korea) Yang Yong-eun	(South Korea) Lee Jung-hoon
2003	(South Korea) K. J. Choi (4)	(South Korea) Kim Sang-ki
2002	(South Korea) K. J. Choi (3)	(South Korea) Kim Dae-sub
2001	(South Korea) Kang Wook-soon (3)	(South Korea) Kim Jong-myung
2000	(South Korea) Kang Wook-soon (2)	(South Korea) Suk Jong-yul
1999	(South Korea) Kang Wook-soon	(South Korea) Yang Yong-eun
1998	(South Korea) Choi Gwang-soo	(South Korea) Kim Seung-il
1997	(South Korea) K. J. Choi (2)	(South Korea) Mo Joong-kyung
1996	(South Korea) K. J. Choi	(South Korea) Lee Boo-young
1995	(South Korea) Choi Sang-ho (9)	(South Korea) K. J. Choi
1994	(South Korea) Choi Sang-ho (8)	(South Korea) Park No-seok
1993	(South Korea) Park Nam-sin (2)	(South Korea) Ha Young-ki
1992	(South Korea) Choi Sang-ho (7)	(South Korea) Han Young-keun
1991	(South Korea) Choi Sang-ho (6)	(South Korea) Lim Hyung-soo
1990	(South Korea) Lee Kang-sun	(South Korea) Lee Kang-sun
1989	(South Korea) Bong Tae-ha	(South Korea) Choi Gwang-soo (South Korea) Kim Jong-duck
1988	(South Korea) Park Nam-sin	(South Korea) Kwak Yu-hyun (South Korea) Park Nam-sin
1987	(South Korea) Choi Youn-soo	(South Korea) Cho Bum-soo (South Korea) Kim Sung-ho
1986	(South Korea) Choi Sang-ho (5)	No award
1985	(South Korea) Choi Sang-ho (4)	(South Korea) Cho Chul-sang
1984	(South Korea) Choi Sang-ho (3)	No award
1983	(South Korea) Choi Sang-ho (2)	No award
1982	(South Korea) Han Chang-sang (2)	No award
1981	(South Korea) Choi Sang-ho	No award
1980	(South Korea) Kim Seung-hack	No award
1979	(South Korea) Han Chang-sang	No award
1978	(South Korea) Cho Tae-woon	(South Korea) Cho Ho-sang (South Korea) Choi Sang-ho
