= Andrew Landry =

American professional golfer (born 1987)

Personal information
- Full name: Andrew Dwain Landry
- Nationality: United States
- Born: August 7, 1987 (age 39) Port Neches, Texas, U.S.
- Height: 5 ft 7 in (1.70 m)
- Weight: 150 lb (68 kg; 11 st)
- Spouse: Elizabeth Landry
- Children: 2

Career
- Sport: Golf
- College: University of Arkansas
- Turned professional: 2009
- Current tour: PGA Tour
- Former tour: Web.com Tour
- Professional wins: 6
- Highest ranking: 64 (April 29, 2018) (as of October 25, 2026)

Number of wins by tour
- PGA Tour: 2
- Korn Ferry Tour: 2
- Other: 2

Best results in major championships
- Masters Tournament: T46: 2019
- PGA Championship: T50: 2018
- U.S. Open: T15: 2016
- The Open Championship: CUT: 2018

Andrew Dwain Landry (born August 7, 1987) is an American professional golfer who plays on the PGA Tour.

== Early life and amateur career ==
In 1987, Landry was born in Port Neches, Texas. He played college golf at the University of Arkansas in Fayetteville, where he was a three-time All-American and won one individual title. In 2009, he graduated.

== Professional career ==
In 2009, Landry turned professional. He played on the mini-tours, including the Adams Pro Tour where he won twice. He earned his 2015 Web.com Tour card after finishing runner-up in the Web.com Tour Qualifying Tournament. He won the third event of the year at the Cartagena de Indias at Karibana Championship.

Landry made his PGA Tour debut as a Monday qualifier at the Shell Houston Open in April 2015, where he missed the cut with rounds of 76–73. This was the only event he played on the PGA Tour in 2015. He joined the PGA Tour for the 2016 season after qualifying through the Web.com Tour.

Landry qualified for his first major, the 2016 U.S. Open at Oakmont Country Club, through local qualifying in Durham, North Carolina and sectional qualifying in Memphis, Tennessee. In the first round, which was disrupted by weather delays, Landry, ranked 624th in the world, shot a 4-under-par 66 to lead the championship by one stroke. His round of 66 was the best ever opening round in a U.S. Open hosted at Oakmont. He followed this up with a 71 in the second round, which placed him in the final group for round three, one stroke behind Dustin Johnson. He continued his fine play with a 70 in the third round to get into the final group on Sunday, four shots back of Shane Lowry. Landry fell away in the final round though, shooting an 8-over-par 78 to finish T15 in his first major.

In January 2018, Landry lost in a sudden-death playoff to Jon Rahm on the fourth extra hole at the CareerBuilder Challenge. Landry had to birdie the final regulation hole to force a playoff with Rahm. During the playoff, Landry had a makeable putt for birdie on the second extra hole to win the tournament, but missed it to the right. After three pars, Rahm won the playoff with a birdie on the fourth extra hole.

In April 2018, Landry won the Valero Texas Open for his first PGA Tour victory.

On January 19, 2020, Landry won The American Express in La Quinta, California. This was his second PGA Tour victory. In the final round, Landry made three straight bogeys beginning at the par-3 13th. On the 17th tee, Landry, who had once led by six, was tied for the lead. Landry then birdied holes 17 and 18 to win the tournament by two strokes over Abraham Ancer.

== Professional wins (6) ==
=== PGA Tour wins (2) ===
| No. | Date | Tournament | Winning score | To par | Margin of victory | Runner(s)-up |
|---|---|---|---|---|---|---|
| 1 | Apr 22, 2018 | Valero Texas Open | 69-67-67-68=271 | −17 | 2 strokes | (United States) Trey Mullinax, (United States) Sean O'Hair |
| 2 | Jan 19, 2020 | The American Express | 66-64-65-67=262 | −26 | 2 strokes | (Mexico) Abraham Ancer |

PGA Tour playoff record (0–1)

| No. | Year | Tournament | Opponent | Result |
|---|---|---|---|---|
| 1 | 2018 | CareerBuilder Challenge | (Spain) Jon Rahm | Lost to birdie on fourth extra hole |

=== Web.com Tour wins (2) ===
| No. | Date | Tournament | Winning score | To par | Margin of victory | Runner(s)-up |
|---|---|---|---|---|---|---|
| 1 | Mar 8, 2015 | Cartagena de Indias at Karibana Championship | 67-74-67-69=277 | −11 | 5 strokes | (Australia) Stephen Allan, (Argentina) Miguel Ángel Carballo |
| 2 | Jan 25, 2017 | The Bahamas Great Abaco Classic | 71-68-66-67=272 | −16 | 3 strokes | (Scotland) Jimmy Gunn |

=== Adams Pro Tour wins (2) ===
- 2012 Cypresswood Open
- 2014 Bay Oaks Open

== Results in major championships ==
Results not in chronological order in 2020.

| Tournament | 2016 | 2017 | 2018 |
|---|---|---|---|
| Masters Tournament | | | |
| U.S. Open | T15 | | |
| The Open Championship | | | CUT |
| PGA Championship | | | T50 |

| Tournament | 2019 | 2020 |
|---|---|---|
| Masters Tournament | T46 | CUT |
| PGA Championship | | CUT |
| U.S. Open | | |
| The Open Championship | | NT |

Did not play

CUT = missed the halfway cut
"T" indicates a tie for a place.
NT = No tournament due to COVID-19 pandemic

== Results in The Players Championship ==
| Tournament | 2018 | 2019 | 2020 | 2021 |
|---|---|---|---|---|
| The Players Championship | T67 | T47 | C | CUT |

CUT = missed the halfway cut
"T" indicates a tie for a place
C = Canceled after the first round due to the COVID-19 pandemic

== Results in World Golf Championships ==
| Tournament | 2018 | 2019 | 2020 |
|---|---|---|---|
| Championship | | | |
| Match Play | | | NT^{1} |
| Invitational | T57 | | T30 |
| Champions | | | NT^{1} |

^{1}Cancelled due to COVID-19 pandemic

Did not play

NT = No tournament
"T" = Tied

== See also ==
- 2015 Web.com Tour Finals graduates
- 2017 Web.com Tour Finals graduates
