= The Open Championship format and qualification =

Golf tournament held in the United Kingdom

The Open Championship qualification was first introduced in 1907, and is the process that a player goes through to qualify for The Open Championship. The Open Championship is the oldest golf competition in the world, and generally regarded as one of the most prestigious. The qualifying structure is designed to reduce more than 2,500 entrants on five continents, to a field size of 156 competing in the tournament.

In the modern era, the main way players qualify is by an exemption due to their performance in major golf tours, major tournaments, or their position in the official world golf rankings. For those who are not exempt, they can qualify by performing well in the Open Qualifying Series of international sanctioned tournaments, or via local qualifying in the UK.

The format of the final tournament was originally 36 holes played on a single day, but has evolved to the current format of four days of 18 holes, with the lowest scoring golfers cut after the first 36 holes.

== Current qualifying process ==
Players can qualify one of four ways, an exemption, via the Open Qualifying Series (OQS), via local qualifying, or if the field size has not reached 156, being one of the highest rated players in the official golf rankings that is not already qualified.

=== Exemption qualifiers ===
Around 65% of the field is exempt from qualifying. Not all those eligible for entry will compete (e.g. older previous Open winners, and injured players).

The current criteria for an exemption is governed by the following rules:

1. Previous Open Champions aged 55 or under on the final day of the tournament from the 2024 tournament onward (Each year a number of past champions choose not to compete).
  Champions from 2023 and prior are grandfathered until each champion turns 60.
2. Winners of selected tournaments (for the number of previous years shown in parentheses):
  Former champions over the age limit that win the preceding The Senior Open qualify regardless of age.
  The Open (10), Masters (5), PGA Championship (5), U.S. Open (5), The Players (3), BMW PGA Championship (3), Open de Argentina (1), Japan Open (1), Diamond Cup Golf (1), The Senior Open (1).
3. Top 10 and ties from the previous year's Open Championship.
4. Top 50 in the Official World Golf Ranking for Week 21 (the Open is Week 29).
5. Top finishers in the previous season of selected golf tours:
  European Tour's Race to Dubai (30), PGA Tour's FedEx Cup (30), Japan Golf Tour (2), PGA Tour of Australasia (1), Sunshine Tour (1).
6. Performance in the current year on selected golf tours for Week 25:
  European Tour (top 5 not already exempt, within the top 20), PGA Tour (top 5 not already exempt, within the top 20), Japan Golf Tour (top player not already exempt), LIV Golf (top player not already exempt, within the top 5).
7. Current holders of selected amateur titles (if they are still amateurs):
  Amateur Champion, U.S. Amateur Champion, European Amateur Champion, Asia-Pacific Amateur Champion, Mark H. McCormack Medal.

=== Open Qualifying Series ===
Around 22% of the field qualify via the Open Qualifying Series. It was introduced in 2014 and replaced international qualifying events run by the Open. Qualifying is available to the leading players (not otherwise exempt) who finish in the top n and ties, in around twelve events run by several international golf tours. The Open Series Qualifying events since 2019 are:

Location	Tournament	2019		2021	
Location	Tournament	Spots	Top	Spots	Top
Australia	ISPS Handa Australian Open	3	10	3	10
Africa	South African Open	3	10	3	10
Singapore	SMBC Singapore Open	4	12	4	12
United States	Arnold Palmer Invitational	3	10	3	10
Japan	Mizuno Open	4	12	n/a	
Morocco	Trophée Hassan II	n/a		n/a	
Canada	RBC Canadian Open	3	10	n/a	
Korea	Kolon Korea Open	2	8	n/a	
Spain	Andalucia Valderrama Masters	3	10	n/a	
United States	Rocket Mortgage Classic	2	8	n/a	
United States	Travelers Championship	n/a		n/a	
Ireland	Dubai Duty Free Irish Open	3	10	n/a	
Scotland	Aberdeen Standard Investments Scottish Open	3	10	n/a	
United States	John Deere Classic	1	5	n/a	

Note: 2021 tournament criteria affected by COVID-19

=== Local and Final qualifying ===
Currently 12 players (8% of the field) qualify through final qualifying in the United Kingdom.

==== Local Qualifying ====
Local qualifying begins with 15 events, of 18 holes occurring on a single day just over three weeks before the Open Championship. It is open to those who meet any of the following criteria:

- Male professional golfer.
- Male amateur golfer whose playing handicap does not exceed 0.4 (i.e. scratch).
- Male amateur golfer who has been within World Amateur Golf Ranking listing 1–2,000 during the current calendar year.

A week later, the best performers then progress to final qualifying, where there are four events of 36 holes occurring on a single day, with three qualifiers from each event.

==== Final Qualifying ====
In addition to the best performers at local qualifying, players who meet the following criteria are able to compete in final qualifying:

- Past champions of The Open who have exceeded the age limit.
- Any competitor with an Official World Golf Ranking in the top 1,000 and ties on the date of entry.
- Past champions of the Masters Tournament, the U.S. Open and the PGA Championship.
- Anyone who played in the previous edition of the Open.
- First 10 and anyone tying for 10th place in the Titleist and FootJoy PGA Professional Championship.
- First 10 and anyone tying for 10th place in the PGA of America Professional Championship.
- Past playing members of Ryder and Presidents Cup Teams.
- Playing members of the 5 leading teams and ties in the Eisenhower Trophy.
- Playing members in the last St Andrews Trophy.
- The Amateur champions in the last 6 years.
- The U.S. Amateur champions in the last 6 years.
- The European Amateur champions in the last 6 years.
- The current English, Scottish, Irish and Welsh Amateur champions, from the respective closed Amateur Championships.
- The current runners-up in each of the Amateur Championship and European Amateur, and the U.S. Amateur.
- The leading 10 World Amateur Golf Ranking players, not otherwise exempt as at calendar week 21.
- The current Boys Amateur champion.
- The current Latin America Amateur champion and runner(s)-up.
- The current Asia-Pacific Amateur runners(s)-up. This is only applicable if the entrant has not played in the OQS Singapore.

Note: Any qualifier via an amateur performance must still have amateur status

==== Monday qualifier ====
On 2 December 2025, a Monday qualifier, the Last Chance Qualifier, was announced by The R&A. This Monday qualifier, held at the venue of The Open that ensuing Thursday, will determine the 156th position in The Open Championship. The following procedures will be used in determining who participates in the one-round match. Only the winner advances, and if necessary, a playoff will be held.

- The top two players in the Official World Golf Ranking who have not qualified as of the week before the qualifier.
- The runner-up in The Amateur Championship, provided the player is an amateur as of the qualifying tournament (may turn professional after the qualifying tournament).
- Players in Final Qualifying who made a playoff, but were eliminated.
- Players in Final Qualifying who finished one position behind the final qualifier.
- Players who were tied for a qualifying place in various events included as part of The Open Qualifying Series, but did not qualify due to a lower position in the Official World Golf Ranking (excludes the Genesis Scottish Open)

The first 12 players to accept, based on such criteria, will participate. Further alternates will be added should the two Official World Golf Ranking players who have not qualified are moved into the field by that Monday.

=== Alternates ===
If the field size has not reached 156, then the highest ranked players not already qualified are offered a spot in the Open. The two highest OWGR ranked golfers, followed by the results of the Monday qualifier will determine initial slots in the alternate list.

== Current format ==
- Field: 156 players
- Basic format: 72 hole stroke play. Play 18 holes a day over four days, weather permitting.
- Date of tournament: Starts on the day before the third Friday in July.
- Tournament days: Thursday to Sunday.
- Tee off times: Each player has one morning and one afternoon tee time in first two days in groups of three, which are mostly randomised (with some organiser discretion). Groupings of two on the last two days with last place going off first and leaders going out last.
- Cut: After 36 holes, only top 70 and ties play the final 36 holes.
- Playoff: If there is a tie for the lead after 72 holes, a four-hole aggregate playoff is held; followed by sudden death if the lead is still tied.

== History of qualification and format ==
Qualifying was first introduced from 1907, except 1910–1911, where a 36 hole cut was made instead. 1926 was the first year where there was both a cut and qualifying, and this has been the situation ever since. Qualifying generally happened the day before or shortly before the Open, and everyone was required to qualify until 1962. In 1963 exemptions from qualification began, mainly for past champions, but this has now expanded to cover a multitude of achievements and most of the field now qualify by exemption. In the 1980s, the R&A was concerned that its process was not adequately allowing for players which played on multiple tours, and so actively brought about what is now known as the Official World Golf Ranking to use as part of the exemption process.

In 2004 international qualifying was introduced, which meant that players did not have to travel to the UK to participate in qualifying. This was replaced in 2014 by the Open Qualifying Series, which gave qualifying spots to the best performers in existing global golf events.

The biggest change to the format of the tournament was in 1892 when the tournament was expanded from 36 holes to 72 holes. Another notable change in the rules was making it mandatory to use the 1.68 inch diameter ball (as was used by the USGA) in 1974 instead of the 1.62 inch diameter ball, which was entirely eliminated by the 1990 revision to the Rules of Golf.

Year	Edition	Field size	Entry	Format	Cut	Playoff
2023	151st	156	Exemption from qualifying for the leading players including all previous Open champions aged 60 and under. Local qualifying. Open Qualifying Series. Total of 156 qualify.	72 holes over 4 days. 18 holes a day. Days standardised as Thursday to Sunday. Play in groups of 3 in first 2 days. Leaders go off last after 36 holes.	Cut after 36 holes, top 70 and ties.	Three-hole playoff followed by sudden death.
2022	150th	156	Exemption from qualifying for the leading players including all previous Open champions aged 60 and under. Local qualifying. Open Qualifying Series. Total of 156 qualify.	72 holes over 4 days. 18 holes a day. Days standardised as Thursday to Sunday. Play in groups of 3 in first 2 days. Leaders go off last after 36 holes.	Cut after 36 holes, top 70 and ties.	Three-hole playoff followed by sudden death.
2021	149th	156	Exemption from qualifying for the leading players including all previous Open champions aged 60 and under. Local qualifying. Open Qualifying Series. Total of 156 qualify.	72 holes over 4 days. 18 holes a day. Days standardised as Thursday to Sunday. Play in groups of 3 in first 2 days. Leaders go off last after 36 holes.	Cut after 36 holes, top 70 and ties.	Three-hole playoff followed by sudden death.
2020	–	–	Exemption from qualifying for the leading players including all previous Open champions aged 60 and under. Local qualifying. Open Qualifying Series. Total of 156 qualify.	72 holes over 4 days. 18 holes a day. Days standardised as Thursday to Sunday. Play in groups of 3 in first 2 days. Leaders go off last after 36 holes.	Cut after 36 holes, top 70 and ties.	Three-hole playoff followed by sudden death.
2019	148th	156	Exemption from qualifying for the leading players including all previous Open champions aged 60 and under. Local qualifying. Open Qualifying Series. Total of 156 qualify.	72 holes over 4 days. 18 holes a day. Days standardised as Thursday to Sunday. Play in groups of 3 in first 2 days. Leaders go off last after 36 holes.	Cut after 36 holes, top 70 and ties.	Three-hole playoff followed by sudden death.
2018	147th	156	Exemption from qualifying for the leading players including all previous Open champions aged 60 and under. Local qualifying. Open Qualifying Series. Total of 156 qualify.	72 holes over 4 days. 18 holes a day. Days standardised as Thursday to Sunday. Play in groups of 3 in first 2 days. Leaders go off last after 36 holes.	Cut after 36 holes, top 70 and ties.	Four-hole playoff followed by sudden death.
2017	146th	156	Exemption from qualifying for the leading players including all previous Open champions aged 60 and under. Local qualifying. Open Qualifying Series. Total of 156 qualify.	72 holes over 4 days. 18 holes a day. Days standardised as Thursday to Sunday. Play in groups of 3 in first 2 days. Leaders go off last after 36 holes.	Cut after 36 holes, top 70 and ties.	Four-hole playoff followed by sudden death.
2016	145th	156	Exemption from qualifying for the leading players including all previous Open champions aged 60 and under. Local qualifying. Open Qualifying Series. Total of 156 qualify.	72 holes over 4 days. 18 holes a day. Days standardised as Thursday to Sunday. Play in groups of 3 in first 2 days. Leaders go off last after 36 holes.	Cut after 36 holes, top 70 and ties.	Four-hole playoff followed by sudden death.
2015	144th	156	Exemption from qualifying for the leading players including all previous Open champions aged 60 and under. Local qualifying. Open Qualifying Series. Total of 156 qualify.	72 holes over 4 days. 18 holes a day. Days standardised as Thursday to Sunday. Play in groups of 3 in first 2 days. Leaders go off last after 36 holes.	Cut after 36 holes, top 70 and ties.	Four-hole playoff followed by sudden death.
2014	143rd	156	Exemption from qualifying for the leading players including all previous Open champions aged 60 and under. Local qualifying. Open Qualifying Series. Total of 156 qualify.	72 holes over 4 days. 18 holes a day. Days standardised as Thursday to Sunday. Play in groups of 3 in first 2 days. Leaders go off last after 36 holes.	Cut after 36 holes, top 70 and ties.	Four-hole playoff followed by sudden death.
2013	142nd	156	Exemption from qualifying for the leading players including all previous Open champions aged 60 and under. Local qualifying. International Qualifying. Total of 156 qualify.	72 holes over 4 days. 18 holes a day. Days standardised as Thursday to Sunday. Play in groups of 3 in first 2 days. Leaders go off last after 36 holes.	Cut after 36 holes, top 70 and ties.	Four-hole playoff followed by sudden death.
2012	141st	156	Exemption from qualifying for the leading players including all previous Open champions aged 60 and under. Local qualifying. International Qualifying. Total of 156 qualify.	72 holes over 4 days. 18 holes a day. Days standardised as Thursday to Sunday. Play in groups of 3 in first 2 days. Leaders go off last after 36 holes.	Cut after 36 holes, top 70 and ties.	Four-hole playoff followed by sudden death.
2011	140th	156	Exemption from qualifying for the leading players including all previous Open champions aged 60 and under. Local qualifying. International Qualifying. Total of 156 qualify.	72 holes over 4 days. 18 holes a day. Days standardised as Thursday to Sunday. Play in groups of 3 in first 2 days. Leaders go off last after 36 holes.	Cut after 36 holes, top 70 and ties.	Four-hole playoff followed by sudden death.
2010	139th	156	Exemption from qualifying for the leading players including all previous Open champions aged 60 and under. Local qualifying. International Qualifying. Total of 156 qualify.	72 holes over 4 days. 18 holes a day. Days standardised as Thursday to Sunday. Play in groups of 3 in first 2 days. Leaders go off last after 36 holes.	Cut after 36 holes, top 70 and ties.	Four-hole playoff followed by sudden death.
2009	138th	156	Exemption from qualifying for the leading players including all previous Open champions aged 60 and under. Local qualifying. International Qualifying. Total of 156 qualify.	72 holes over 4 days. 18 holes a day. Days standardised as Thursday to Sunday. Play in groups of 3 in first 2 days. Leaders go off last after 36 holes.	Cut after 36 holes, top 70 and ties.	Four-hole playoff followed by sudden death.
2008	137th	156	Exemption from qualifying for the leading players including all previous Open champions aged 60 and under. Local qualifying. International Qualifying. Total of 156 qualify.	72 holes over 4 days. 18 holes a day. Days standardised as Thursday to Sunday. Play in groups of 3 in first 2 days. Leaders go off last after 36 holes.	Cut after 36 holes, top 70 and ties.	Four-hole playoff followed by sudden death.
2007	136th	156	Exemption from qualifying for the leading players including all previous Open champions aged 65 and under. Local qualifying. International Qualifying. Total of 156 qualify.	72 holes over 4 days. 18 holes a day. Days standardised as Thursday to Sunday. Play in groups of 3 in first 2 days. Leaders go off last after 36 holes.	Cut after 36 holes, top 70 and ties.	Four-hole playoff followed by sudden death.
2006	135th	156	Exemption from qualifying for the leading players including all previous Open champions aged 65 and under. Local qualifying. International Qualifying. Total of 156 qualify.	72 holes over 4 days. 18 holes a day. Days standardised as Thursday to Sunday. Play in groups of 3 in first 2 days. Leaders go off last after 36 holes.	Cut after 36 holes, top 70 and ties.	Four-hole playoff followed by sudden death.
2005	134th	156	Exemption from qualifying for the leading players including all previous Open champions aged 65 and under. Local qualifying. International Qualifying. Total of 156 qualify.	72 holes over 4 days. 18 holes a day. Days standardised as Thursday to Sunday. Play in groups of 3 in first 2 days. Leaders go off last after 36 holes.	Cut after 36 holes, top 70 and ties.	Four-hole playoff followed by sudden death.
2004	133rd	156	Exemption from qualifying for the leading players including all previous Open champions aged 65 and under. Local qualifying. International Qualifying. Total of 156 qualify.	72 holes over 4 days. 18 holes a day. Days standardised as Thursday to Sunday. Play in groups of 3 in first 2 days. Leaders go off last after 36 holes.	Cut after 36 holes, top 70 and ties.	Four-hole playoff followed by sudden death.
2003	132nd	156	Exemption from qualifying for the leading players including all previous Open champions aged 65 and under. Local qualifying. Total of 156 qualify.	72 holes over 4 days. 18 holes a day. Days standardised as Thursday to Sunday. Play in groups of 3 in first 2 days. Leaders go off last after 36 holes.	Cut after 36 holes, top 70 and ties.	Four-hole playoff followed by sudden death.
2002	131st	156	Exemption from qualifying for the leading players including all previous Open champions aged 65 and under. Local qualifying. Total of 156 qualify.	72 holes over 4 days. 18 holes a day. Days standardised as Thursday to Sunday. Play in groups of 3 in first 2 days. Leaders go off last after 36 holes.	Cut after 36 holes, top 70 and ties.	Four-hole playoff followed by sudden death.
2001	130th	156	Exemption from qualifying for the leading players including all previous Open champions aged 65 and under. Local qualifying. Total of 156 qualify.	72 holes over 4 days. 18 holes a day. Days standardised as Thursday to Sunday. Play in groups of 3 in first 2 days. Leaders go off last after 36 holes.	Cut after 36 holes, top 70 and ties.	Four-hole playoff followed by sudden death.
2000	129th	156	Exemption from qualifying for the leading players including all previous Open champions aged 65 and under. Local qualifying. Total of 156 qualify.	72 holes over 4 days. 18 holes a day. Days standardised as Thursday to Sunday. Play in groups of 3 in first 2 days. Leaders go off last after 36 holes.	Cut after 36 holes, top 70 and ties.	Four-hole playoff followed by sudden death.
1999	128th	156	Exemption from qualifying for the leading players including all previous Open champions aged 65 and under. Local qualifying. Total of 156 qualify.	72 holes over 4 days. 18 holes a day. Days standardised as Thursday to Sunday. Play in groups of 3 in first 2 days. Leaders go off last after 36 holes.	Cut after 36 holes, top 70 and ties.	Four-hole playoff followed by sudden death.
1998	127th	156	Exemption from qualifying for the leading players including all previous Open champions aged 65 and under. Local qualifying. Total of 156 qualify.	72 holes over 4 days. 18 holes a day. Days standardised as Thursday to Sunday. Play in groups of 3 in first 2 days. Leaders go off last after 36 holes.	Cut after 36 holes, top 70 and ties.	Four-hole playoff followed by sudden death.
1997	126th	156	Exemption from qualifying for the leading players including all previous Open champions aged 65 and under. Local qualifying. Total of 156 qualify.	72 holes over 4 days. 18 holes a day. Days standardised as Thursday to Sunday. Play in groups of 3 in first 2 days. Leaders go off last after 36 holes.	Cut after 36 holes, top 70 and ties.	Four-hole playoff followed by sudden death.
1996	125th	156	Exemption from qualifying for the leading players including all previous Open champions aged 65 and under. Local qualifying. Total of 156 qualify.	72 holes over 4 days. 18 holes a day. Days standardised as Thursday to Sunday. Play in groups of 3 in first 2 days. Leaders go off last after 36 holes.	Cut after 36 holes, top 70 and ties.	Four-hole playoff followed by sudden death.
1995	124th	159	Exemption from qualifying for the leading players including all previous Open champions aged 65 and under. Local qualifying. Total of 156 qualify.	72 holes over 4 days. 18 holes a day. Days standardised as Thursday to Sunday. Play in groups of 3 in first 2 days. Leaders go off last after 36 holes.	Cut after 36 holes, top 70 and ties. Those within 10 shots of the leader not cut.	Four-hole playoff followed by sudden death.
1994	123rd	156	Exemption from qualifying for the leading players including all previous Open champions under 65. Local qualifying. Total of 156 qualify.	72 holes over 4 days. 18 holes a day. Days standardised as Thursday to Sunday. Play in groups of 3 in first 2 days. Leaders go off last after 36 holes.	Cut after 36 holes, top 70 and ties. Those within 10 shots of the leader not cut.	Four-hole playoff followed by sudden death.
1993	122nd	156	Exemption from qualifying for the leading players including all previous Open champions under 65. Local qualifying. Total of 156 qualify.	72 holes over 4 days. 18 holes a day. Days standardised as Thursday to Sunday. Play in groups of 3 in first 2 days. Leaders go off last after 36 holes.	Cut after 36 holes, top 70 and ties. Those within 10 shots of the leader not cut.	Four-hole playoff followed by sudden death.
1992	121st	156	Exemption from qualifying for the leading players including all previous Open champions under 65. Local qualifying. Total of 156 qualify.	72 holes over 4 days. 18 holes a day. Days standardised as Thursday to Sunday. Play in groups of 3 in first 2 days. Leaders go off last after 36 holes.	Cut after 36 holes, top 70 and ties. Those within 10 shots of the leader not cut.	Four-hole playoff followed by sudden death.
1991	120th	156	Exemption from qualifying for the leading players including all previous Open champions under 65. Local qualifying. Total of 156 qualify.	72 holes over 4 days. 18 holes a day. Days standardised as Thursday to Sunday. Play in groups of 3 in first 2 days. Leaders go off last after 36 holes.	Cut after 36 holes, top 70 and ties. Those within 10 shots of the leader not cut.	Four-hole playoff followed by sudden death.
1990	119th	156	Exemption from qualifying for the leading players including all previous Open champions under 65. Local qualifying. Total of 156 qualify.	72 holes over 4 days. 18 holes a day. Days standardised as Thursday to Sunday. Play in groups of 3 in first 2 days. Leaders go off last after 36 holes.	Cut after 36 holes, top 70 and ties. Those within 10 shots of the leader not cut.	Four-hole playoff followed by sudden death.
1989	118th	156	Exemption from qualifying for the leading players including all previous Open champions under 65. Local qualifying. Total of 156 qualify.	72 holes over 4 days. 18 holes a day. Days standardised as Thursday to Sunday. Play in groups of 3 in first 2 days. Leaders go off last after 36 holes.	Cut after 36 holes, top 70 and ties. Those within 10 shots of the leader not cut.	Four-hole playoff followed by sudden death.
1988	117th	153	Exemption from qualifying for the leading players including all previous Open champions under 65. Local qualifying. Total of 153 qualify.	72 holes over 4 days. 18 holes a day. Days standardised as Thursday to Sunday. Play in groups of 3 in first 2 days. Leaders go off last after 36 holes.	Cut after 36 holes, top 70 and ties. Those within 10 shots of the leader not cut.	Four-hole playoff followed by sudden death.
1987	116th	153	Exemption from qualifying for the leading players including all previous Open champions under 65. Local qualifying. Total of 153 qualify.	72 holes over 4 days. 18 holes a day. Days standardised as Thursday to Sunday. Play in groups of 3 in first 2 days. Leaders go off last after 36 holes.	Cut after 36 holes, top 70 and ties. Those within 10 shots of the leader not cut.	Four-hole playoff followed by sudden death.
1986	115th	153	Exemption from qualifying for the leading players including all previous Open champions under 65. Local qualifying. Total of 153 qualify.	72 holes over 4 days. 18 holes a day. Days standardised as Thursday to Sunday. Play in groups of 3 in first 2 days. Leaders go off last after 36 holes.	Cut after 36 holes, top 70 and ties. Those within 10 shots of the leader not cut.	Four-hole playoff followed by sudden death.
1985	114th	153	Exemption from qualifying for the leading players including all previous Open champions under 65. Local qualifying. Total of 153 qualify.	72 holes over 4 days. 18 holes a day. Days standardised as Thursday to Sunday. Play in groups of 3 in first 2 days. Leaders go off last after 36 holes.	Cut after 36 holes, top 80 and ties. Cut after 54 holes, top 60 and ties. Those within 10 shots of the leader not cut.	18 hole playoff followed by sudden death.
1984	113th	156	Exemption from qualifying for the leading players including all previous Open champions under 65. Local qualifying. Total of 153 qualify.	72 holes over 4 days. 18 holes a day. Days standardised as Thursday to Sunday. Play in groups of 3 in first 2 days. Leaders go off last after 36 holes.	Cut after 36 holes, top 80 and ties. Cut after 54 holes, top 60 and ties. Those within 10 shots of the leader not cut.	18 hole playoff followed by sudden death.
1983	112th	151	Exemption from qualifying for the leading players including all previous Open champions. Local qualifying. Total of 150 qualify.	72 holes over 4 days. 18 holes a day. Days standardised as Thursday to Sunday. Play in groups of 3 in first 2 days. Leaders go off last after 36 holes.	Cut after 36 holes, top 80 and ties. Cut after 54 holes, top 60 and ties. Those within 10 shots of the leader not cut.	18 hole playoff followed by sudden death.
1982	111th	150	Exemption from qualifying for the leading players including all previous Open champions. Local qualifying. Total of 150 qualify.	72 holes over 4 days. 18 holes a day. Days standardised as Thursday to Sunday. Play in groups of 3 in first 2 days. Leaders go off last after 36 holes.	Cut after 36 holes, top 80 and ties. Cut after 54 holes, top 60 and ties. Those within 10 shots of the leader not cut.	18 hole playoff followed by sudden death.
1981	110th	153	Exemption from qualifying for the leading players including all previous Open champions. Local qualifying. Total of 150 qualify.	72 holes over 4 days. 18 holes a day. Days standardised as Thursday to Sunday. Play in groups of 3 in first 2 days. Leaders go off last after 36 holes.	Cut after 36 holes, top 80 and ties. Cut after 54 holes, top 60 and ties. Those within 10 shots of the leader not cut.	18 hole playoff followed by sudden death.
1980	109th	151	Exemption from qualifying for the leading players including all previous Open champions. Local qualifying. Total of 150 qualify.	72 holes over 4 days. 18 holes a day. Days standardised as Thursday to Sunday. Play in groups of 3 in first 2 days. Leaders go off last after 36 holes.	Cut after 36 holes, top 80 and ties. Cut after 54 holes, top 60 and ties. Those within 10 shots of the leader not cut.	18 hole playoff followed by sudden death.
1979	108th	152	Exemption from qualifying for the leading players including all previous Open champions. Local qualifying. Total of 150 qualify.	72 holes over 4 days. 18 holes a day. Days standardised as Wednesday to Saturday. Play in groups of 3 in first 2 days. Leaders go off last after 36 holes.	Cut after 36 holes, top 80 and ties. Cut after 54 holes, top 60 and ties. Those within 10 shots of the leader not cut.	18 hole playoff followed by sudden death.
1978	107th	155	Exemption from qualifying for the leading players including all previous Open champions. Local qualifying. Total of 150 qualify.	72 holes over 4 days. 18 holes a day. Days standardised as Wednesday to Saturday. Play in groups of 3 in first 2 days. Leaders go off last after 36 holes.	Cut after 36 holes, top 80 and ties. Cut after 54 holes, top 60 and ties. Those within 10 shots of the leader not cut.	18 hole playoff followed by sudden death.
1977	106th	156	Exemption from qualifying for the leading players including all previous Open champions. Local qualifying. Total of 150 qualify.	72 holes over 4 days. 18 holes a day. Days standardised as Wednesday to Saturday. Play in groups of 3 in first 2 days. Leaders go off last after 36 holes.	Cut after 36 holes, top 80 and ties. Cut after 54 holes, top 60 and ties.	18 hole playoff followed by sudden death.
1976	105th	155	Exemption from qualifying for the leading players including all previous Open champions. Local qualifying. Total of 150 qualify.	72 holes over 4 days. 18 holes a day. Days standardised as Wednesday to Saturday. Play in groups of 3 in first 2 days. Leaders go off last after 36 holes.	Cut after 36 holes, top 80 and ties. Cut after 54 holes, top 60 and ties.	18 hole playoff followed by sudden death.
1975	104th	153	Exemption from qualifying for the leading players including all previous Open champions. Local qualifying. Total of 150 qualify.	72 holes over 4 days. 18 holes a day. Days standardised as Wednesday to Saturday. Play in groups of 3 in first 2 days. Leaders go off last after 36 holes.	Cut after 36 holes, top 80 and ties. Cut after 54 holes, top 60 and ties.	18 hole playoff followed by sudden death.
1974	103rd	154	Exemption from qualifying for the leading players including all previous Open champions. Local qualifying. Total of 150 qualify.	72 holes over 4 days. 18 holes a day. Days standardised as Wednesday to Saturday. Play in groups of 3 in first 2 days. Leaders go off last after 36 holes.	Cut after 36 holes, top 80 and ties. Cut after 54 holes, top 60 and ties.	18 hole playoff followed by sudden death.
1973	102nd	153	Exemption from qualifying for the leading players including all previous Open champions. Local qualifying. Total of 150 qualify.	72 holes over 4 days. 18 holes a day. Days standardised as Wednesday to Saturday. Play in groups of 3 in first 2 days. Leaders go off last after 36 holes.	Cut after 36 holes, top 80 and ties. Cut after 54 holes, top 60 and ties.	18 hole playoff followed by sudden death.
1972	101st	153	Exemption from qualifying for the leading players including all previous Open champions. Local qualifying. Total of 150 qualify.	72 holes over 4 days. 18 holes a day. Days standardised as Wednesday to Saturday. Leaders go off last after 36 holes.	Cut after 36 holes, top 80 and ties. Cut after 54 holes, top 60 and ties.	18 hole playoff followed by sudden death.
1971	100th	150	Exemption from qualifying for the leading players including all previous Open champions. Local qualifying. Total of 150 qualify.	72 holes over 4 days. 18 holes a day. Days standardised as Wednesday to Saturday. Leaders go off last after 36 holes.	Cut after 36 holes, top 80 and ties. Cut after 54 holes, top 60 and ties.	18 hole playoff followed by sudden death.
1970	99th	134	Exemption from qualifying for the leading players including all previous Open champions. Local qualifying. Total of 130 qualify.	72 holes over 4 days. 18 holes a day. Days standardised as Wednesday to Saturday. Leaders go off last after 36 holes.	Cut after 36 holes, top 80 and ties. Cut after 54 holes, top 55 and ties.	18 hole playoff followed by sudden death.
1969	98th	130	Exemption from qualifying for the leading players including all previous Open champions. Local qualifying. Playoff for those tied for final places. Total of 130 qualify.	72 holes over 4 days. 18 holes a day. Days standardised as Wednesday to Saturday. Leaders go off last after 36 holes.	Cut after 36 holes, top 70 and ties. Cut after 54 holes, top 45 and ties.	18 hole playoff followed by sudden death.
1968	97th	130	Exemption from qualifying for the leading players including all previous Open champions. Local qualifying. Playoff for those tied for final places. Total of 130 qualify.	72 holes over 4 days. 18 holes a day. Days standardised as Wednesday to Saturday. Leaders go off last after 36 holes.	Cut after 36 holes, top 70 and ties. Cut after 54 holes, top 45 and ties.	18 hole playoff followed by sudden death.
1967	96th	130	Exemption from qualifying for the leading players including past 10 Open champions. Local qualifying. Playoff for those tied for final places. Total of 130 qualify.	72 holes over 4 days. 18 holes a day. Days standardised as Wednesday to Saturday. Leaders go off last after 36 holes.	Cut after 36 holes, top 55 and ties.	18 hole playoff followed by sudden death.
1966	95th	130	Exemption from qualifying for the leading players including past 10 Open champions. Local qualifying. Playoff for those tied for final places. Total of 130 qualify.	72 holes over 4 days. 18 holes a day. Days standardised as Wednesday to Saturday. Leaders go off last after 36 holes.	Cut after 36 holes, top 55 and ties.	18 hole playoff followed by sudden death.
1965	94th	130	Exemption from qualifying for the leading players including past 10 Open champions. Local qualifying. Playoff for those tied for final places. Total of 130 qualify.	72 holes over 3 days. 18 holes on the first 2 days, 36 on the 3rd day. Days standardised as Wednesday to Friday. Leaders go off last after 36 holes.	Cut after 36 holes, top 45 and ties.	18 hole playoff followed by sudden death.
1964	93rd	120	Exemption from qualifying for the leading players including past 10 Open champions. Local qualifying in two separate competition. Two courses near the Open venue are used but not the Open venue itself. Playoff for those tied for final places. Total of 120 qualify.	72 holes over 3 days. 18 holes on the first 2 days, 36 on the 3rd day. Days standardised as Wednesday to Friday. Leaders go off last after 36 holes.	Cut after 36 holes, top 45 and ties.	18 hole playoff followed by sudden death.
1963	92nd	120	Exemption from qualifying for the leading players including past 10 Open champions. Local qualifying in two separate competition. Two courses near the Open venue are used but not the Open venue itself. Playoff for those tied for final places. Total of 120 qualify.	72 holes over 3 days. 18 holes on the first 2 days, 36 on the 3rd day. Days standardised as Wednesday to Friday. Leaders go off last after 36 holes.	Cut after 36 holes, top 45 and ties.	36 hole playoff.
1962	91st	119	Local qualifying. Maximum of 120 players qualify. Ties for 120th place did not qualify	72 holes over 3 days. 18 holes on the first 2 days, 36 on the 3rd day. Days standardised as Wednesday to Friday. Leaders go off last after 36 holes.	Cut after 36 holes, maximum of 50 players. Ties for 50th place do not make the cut.	36 hole playoff.
1961	90th	108	Local qualifying. Maximum of 120 players qualify. Ties for 120th place did not qualify	72 holes over 3 days. 18 holes on the first 2 days, 36 on the 3rd day. Days standardised as Wednesday to Friday. Leaders go off last after 36 holes.	Cut after 36 holes, maximum of 50 players. Ties for 50th place do not make the cut.	36 hole playoff.
1960	89th	74	Local qualifying. Maximum of 100 players qualify. Ties for 100th place did not qualify.	72 holes over 3 days. 18 holes on the first 2 days, 36 on the 3rd day. Days standardised as Wednesday to Friday. Leaders go off last after 36 holes.	Cut after 36 holes, maximum of 50 players. Ties for 50th place do not make the cut.	36 hole playoff.
1959	88th	90	Local qualifying. Maximum of 100 players qualify. Ties for 100th place did not qualify.	72 holes over 3 days. 18 holes on the first 2 days, 36 on the 3rd day. Days standardised as Wednesday to Friday. Leaders go off last after 36 holes.	Cut after 36 holes, maximum of 50 players. Ties for 50th place do not make the cut.	36 hole playoff.
1958	87th	96	Local qualifying. Maximum of 100 players qualify. Ties for 100th place did not qualify.	72 holes over 3 days. 18 holes on the first 2 days, 36 on the 3rd day. Days standardised as Wednesday to Friday. Leaders go off last after 36 holes.	Cut after 36 holes, maximum of 50 players. Ties for 50th place do not make the cut.	36 hole playoff.
1957	86th	96	Local qualifying. Maximum of 100 players qualify. Ties for 100th place did not qualify.	72 holes over 3 days. 18 holes on the first 2 days, 36 on the 3rd day. Days standardised as Wednesday to Friday. Leaders go off last after 36 holes.	Cut after 36 holes, maximum of 50 players. Ties for 50th place do not make the cut.	36 hole playoff.
1956	85th	96	Local qualifying. Maximum of 100 players qualify. Ties for 100th place did not qualify.	72 holes over 3 days. 18 holes on the first 2 days, 36 on the 3rd day. Days standardised as Wednesday to Friday.	Cut after 36 holes, maximum of 50 players. Ties for 50th place do not make the cut.	36 hole playoff.
1955	84th	94	Local qualifying. Maximum of 100 players qualify. Ties for 100th place did not qualify.	72 holes over 3 days. 18 holes on the first 2 days, 36 on the 3rd day. Days standardised as Wednesday to Friday.	Cut after 36 holes, maximum of 50 players. Ties for 50th place do not make the cut.	36 hole playoff.
1954	83rd	97	Local qualifying. Maximum of 100 players qualify. Ties for 100th place did not qualify.	72 holes over 3 days. 18 holes on the first 2 days, 36 on the 3rd day. Days standardised as Wednesday to Friday.	Cut after 36 holes, maximum of 50 players. Ties for 50th place do not make the cut.	36 hole playoff.
1953	82nd	91	Local qualifying. Maximum of 100 players qualify. Ties for 100th place did not qualify.	72 holes over 3 days. 18 holes on the first 2 days, 36 on the 3rd day. Days standardised as Wednesday to Friday.	Cut after 36 holes, maximum of 50 players. Ties for 50th place do not make the cut.	36 hole playoff.
1952	81st	96	Local qualifying. Maximum of 100 players qualify. Ties for 100th place did not qualify.	72 holes over 3 days. 18 holes on the first 2 days, 36 on the 3rd day. Days standardised as Wednesday to Friday.	Cut after 36 holes, maximum of 50 players. Ties for 50th place do not make the cut.	36 hole playoff.
1951	80th	98	Local qualifying. Maximum of 100 players qualify. Ties for 100th place did not qualify.	72 holes over 3 days. 18 holes on the first 2 days, 36 on the 3rd day. Days standardised as Wednesday to Friday.	Cut after 36 holes, maximum of 50 players. Ties for 50th place do not make the cut.	36 hole playoff.
1950	79th	93	Local qualifying. Maximum of 100 players qualify. Ties for 100th place did not qualify.	72 holes over 3 days. 18 holes on the first 2 days, 36 on the 3rd day. Days standardised as Wednesday to Friday.	Cut after 36 holes., maximum of 40 players. Ties for 40th place do not make the cut.	36 hole playoff.
1949	78th	96	Local qualifying. Maximum of 100 players qualify. Ties for 100th place did not qualify.	72 holes over 3 days. 18 holes on the first 2 days, 36 on the 3rd day. Days standardised as Wednesday to Friday.	Cut after 36 holes., maximum of 40 players. Ties for 40th place do not make the cut.	36 hole playoff.
1948	77th	97	Local qualifying. Maximum of 100 players qualify. Ties for 100th place did not qualify.	72 holes over 3 days. 18 holes on the first 2 days, 36 on the 3rd day. Days standardised as Wednesday to Friday.	Cut after 36 holes., maximum of 40 players. Ties for 40th place do not make the cut.	36 hole playoff.
1947	76th	100	Local qualifying. Maximum of 100 players qualify. Ties for 100th place did not qualify.	72 holes over 3 days. 18 holes on the first 2 days, 36 on the 3rd day. Days standardised as Wednesday to Friday.	Cut after 36 holes., maximum of 40 players. Ties for 40th place do not make the cut.	36 hole playoff.
1946	75th	100	Local qualifying. Maximum of 100 players qualify. Ties for 100th place did not qualify.	72 holes over 3 days. 18 holes on the first 2 days, 36 on the 3rd day. Days standardised as Wednesday to Friday.	Cut after 36 holes., maximum of 40 players. Ties for 40th place do not make the cut.	36 hole playoff.
1945	–	–	Local qualifying. Maximum of 130 players qualify. Ties for 130th place did not qualify.	72 holes over 3 days. 18 holes on the first 2 days, 36 on the 3rd day. Days standardised as Wednesday to Friday.	Cut after 36 holes, maximum of 44 players. Ties for 44th place do not make the cut.	36 hole playoff.
1944	–	–	Local qualifying. Maximum of 130 players qualify. Ties for 130th place did not qualify.	72 holes over 3 days. 18 holes on the first 2 days, 36 on the 3rd day. Days standardised as Wednesday to Friday.	Cut after 36 holes, maximum of 44 players. Ties for 44th place do not make the cut.	36 hole playoff.
1943	–	–	Local qualifying. Maximum of 130 players qualify. Ties for 130th place did not qualify.	72 holes over 3 days. 18 holes on the first 2 days, 36 on the 3rd day. Days standardised as Wednesday to Friday.	Cut after 36 holes, maximum of 44 players. Ties for 44th place do not make the cut.	36 hole playoff.
1942	–	–	Local qualifying. Maximum of 130 players qualify. Ties for 130th place did not qualify.	72 holes over 3 days. 18 holes on the first 2 days, 36 on the 3rd day. Days standardised as Wednesday to Friday.	Cut after 36 holes, maximum of 44 players. Ties for 44th place do not make the cut.	36 hole playoff.
1941	–	–	Local qualifying. Maximum of 130 players qualify. Ties for 130th place did not qualify.	72 holes over 3 days. 18 holes on the first 2 days, 36 on the 3rd day. Days standardised as Wednesday to Friday.	Cut after 36 holes, maximum of 44 players. Ties for 44th place do not make the cut.	36 hole playoff.
1940	–	–	Local qualifying. Maximum of 130 players qualify. Ties for 130th place did not qualify.	72 holes over 3 days. 18 holes on the first 2 days, 36 on the 3rd day. Days standardised as Wednesday to Friday.	Cut after 36 holes, maximum of 44 players. Ties for 44th place do not make the cut.	36 hole playoff.
1939	74th	129	Local qualifying. Maximum of 130 players qualify. Ties for 130th place did not qualify.	72 holes over 3 days. 18 holes on the first 2 days, 36 on the 3rd day. Days standardised as Wednesday to Friday.	Cut after 36 holes, maximum of 44 players. Ties for 44th place do not make the cut.	36 hole playoff.
1938	73rd	120	Local qualifying. Maximum of 130 players qualify. Ties for 130th place did not qualify.	72 holes over 3 days. 18 holes on the first 2 days, 36 on the 3rd day. Days standardised as Wednesday to Friday.	Cut after 36 holes, maximum of 40 players. Ties for 40th place do not make the cut.	36 hole playoff.
1937	72nd	141	Local qualifying. Top 140 and ties qualify.	72 holes over 3 days. 18 holes on the first 2 days, 36 on the 3rd day. Days standardised as Wednesday to Friday.	Cut after 36 holes, top 40 and ties.	36 hole playoff.
1936	71st	107	Local qualifying. Top 100 and ties qualify.	72 holes over 3 days. 18 holes on the first 2 days, 36 on the 3rd day. Days standardised as Wednesday to Friday.	Cut after 36 holes, top 60 and ties.	36 hole playoff.
1935	70th	109	Local qualifying. Top 100 and ties qualify.	72 holes over 3 days. 18 holes on the first 2 days, 36 on the 3rd day. Days standardised as Wednesday to Friday.	Cut after 36 holes, top 60 and ties.	36 hole playoff.
1934	69th	101	Local qualifying. Top 100 and ties qualify.	72 holes over 3 days. 18 holes on the first 2 days, 36 on the 3rd day. Days standardised as Wednesday to Friday.	Cut after 36 holes, top 60 and ties.	36 hole playoff.
1933	68th	117	Local qualifying. Top 100 and ties qualify.	72 holes over 3 days. 18 holes on the first 2 days, 36 on the 3rd day. Days standardised as Wednesday to Friday.	Cut after 36 holes, top 60 and ties.	36 hole playoff.
1932	67th	110	Local qualifying. Top 100 and ties qualify.	72 holes over 3 days. 18 holes on the first 2 days, 36 on the 3rd day. Days standardised as Wednesday to Friday.	Cut after 36 holes, top 60 and ties.	36 hole playoff.
1931	66th	109	Local qualifying. Top 100 and ties qualify.	72 holes over 3 days. 18 holes on the first 2 days, 36 on the 3rd day. Days standardised as Wednesday to Friday.	Cut after 36 holes, top 60 and ties.	36 hole playoff.
1930	65th	112	Local qualifying. Top 100 and ties qualify.	72 holes over 3 days. 18 holes on the first 2 days, 36 on the 3rd day. Days standardised as Wednesday to Friday.	Cut after 36 holes, top 60 and ties.	36 hole playoff.
1929	64th	109	Local qualifying. Top 100 and ties qualify.	72 holes over 3 days. 18 holes on the first 2 days, 36 on the 3rd day. Days standardised as Wednesday to Friday.	Cut after 36 holes, top 60 and ties, and those within 14 strokes.	36 hole playoff.
1928	63rd	113	Local qualifying. Top 100 and ties qualify.	72 holes over 3 days. 18 holes on the first 2 days, 36 on the 3rd day. Days standardised as Wednesday to Friday.	Cut after 36 holes. Those 15 or more strokes behind the leader are excluded from the final day.	36 hole playoff.
1927	62nd	108	Local qualifying. Top 100 and ties qualify.	72 holes over 3 days. 18 holes on the first 2 days, 36 on the 3rd day. Days standardised as Wednesday to Friday.	Cut after 36 holes. Those 15 or more strokes behind the leader are excluded from the final day.	36 hole playoff.
1926	61st	117	Regional qualifying used. Total of 101 and ties qualify at one of three venues (southern, central, northern).	72 holes over 3 days. 18 holes on the first 2 days, 36 on the 3rd day. Days standardised as Wednesday to Friday.	Cut after 36 holes. Those 15 or more strokes behind the leader are excluded from the final day.	36 hole playoff.
1925	60th	83	Local qualifying using two courses. Generally the Championship course is used together with a nearby course. Top 80 and ties qualify.	72 holes over 2 days. 36 holes on each day.	No cut.	36 hole playoff.
1924	59th	86	Local qualifying using two courses. Generally the Championship course is used together with a nearby course. Top 80 and ties qualify.	72 holes over 2 days. 36 holes on each day.	No cut.	36 hole playoff.
1923	58th	88	Local qualifying using two courses. Generally the Championship course is used together with a nearby course. Top 80 and ties qualify.	72 holes over 2 days. 36 holes on each day.	No cut.	36 hole playoff.
1922	57th	80	Local qualifying using two courses. Generally the Championship course is used together with a nearby course. Top 80 and ties qualify.	72 holes over 2 days. 36 holes on each day.	No cut.	36 hole playoff.
1921	56th	85	Local qualifying using two courses. Generally the Championship course is used together with a nearby course. Top 80 and ties qualify.	72 holes over 2 days. 36 holes on each day.	No cut.	36 hole playoff.
1920	55th	82	Separate qualifying for amateurs and professionals. Amateurs qualify at the Open venue (total of 8 places with the Amateur Champion receiving automatic entry). Professionals qualified using two courses in Surrey. Top 72 and ties qualify.	72 holes over 2 days. 36 holes on each day.	No cut.	36 hole playoff.
1919	–	–	Qualifying over two days using two local courses. Exactly 100 players qualify. 18-hole playoff the following day for those tied for final places.	72 holes over 2 days. 36 holes on each day.	No cut.	36 hole playoff.
1918	–	–	Qualifying over two days using two local courses. Exactly 100 players qualify. 18-hole playoff the following day for those tied for final places.	72 holes over 2 days. 36 holes on each day.	No cut.	36 hole playoff.
1917	–	–	Qualifying over two days using two local courses. Exactly 100 players qualify. 18-hole playoff the following day for those tied for final places.	72 holes over 2 days. 36 holes on each day.	No cut.	36 hole playoff.
1916	–	–	Qualifying over two days using two local courses. Exactly 100 players qualify. 18-hole playoff the following day for those tied for final places.	72 holes over 2 days. 36 holes on each day.	No cut.	36 hole playoff.
1915	–	–	Qualifying over two days using two local courses. Exactly 100 players qualify. 18-hole playoff the following day for those tied for final places.	72 holes over 2 days. 36 holes on each day.	No cut.	36 hole playoff.
1914	54th	100	Qualifying over two days using two local courses. Exactly 100 players qualify. 18-hole playoff the following day for those tied for final places.	72 holes over 2 days. 36 holes on each day.	No cut.	36 hole playoff.
1913	53rd	65	Players play 36 championship course holes on one of three days. Top 20 and ties qualify on each day.	72 holes over 2 days. 36 holes on each day.	No cut.	36 hole playoff.
1912	52nd	62	Players play 36 championship course holes on one of three days. Top 20 and ties qualify on each day.	72 holes over 2 days. 36 holes on each day.	No cut.	36 hole playoff.
1911	51st	226	No qualifying.	72 holes over 4 days. 36 spread over 3 days, 36 on the 4th day.	Cut after 36 holes, top 60 and ties make the cut.	36 hole playoff.
1910	50th	210	No qualifying.	72 holes over 3 days. 18 holes on the first 2 days, 36 on the 3rd day.	Cut after 36 holes, top 60 and ties make the cut.	36 hole playoff.
1909	49th	69	36 championship course hole qualifying in 2 groups. 30 from each group qualify. At least 30 pros in each group.	72 holes over 2 days. 36 holes on each day.	No cut.	36 hole playoff.
1908	48th	65	36 championship course hole qualifying in 2 groups. 30 from each group qualify.	72 holes over 2 days. 36 holes on each day.	No cut.	36 hole playoff.
1907	47th	67	36 championship course hole qualifying in 2 groups. 30 from each group qualify.	72 holes over 2 days. 36 holes on each day.	No cut.	36 hole playoff.
1906	46th	181	No Qualifying	72 holes over 3 days. 18 holes on the first 2 days, 36 on the 3rd day.	Cut after 36 holes. Those 15 or more strokes behind the leader are excluded.	36 hole playoff.
1905	45th	148	No Qualifying	72 holes over 3 days. 18 holes on the first 2 days, 36 on the 3rd day.	Cut after 36 holes. Those 15 or more strokes behind the leader are excluded.	36 hole playoff.
1904	44th	144	No Qualifying	72 holes over 3 days. 18 holes on the first 2 days, 36 on the 3rd day.	Cut after 36 holes. Those 20 or more strokes behind the leader are excluded.	36 hole playoff.
1903	43rd	124	No Qualifying	72 holes over 2 days. 36 holes on each day.	Cut after 36 holes. Those 20 or more strokes behind the leader are excluded.	36 hole playoff.
1902	42nd	112	No Qualifying	72 holes over 2 days. 36 holes on each day.	Cut after 36 holes. Those 20 or more strokes behind the leader are excluded.	36 hole playoff.
1901	41st	100	No Qualifying	72 holes over 2 days. 36 holes on each day.	Cut after 36 holes. Those 20 or more strokes behind the leader are excluded.	36 hole playoff.
1900	40th	81	No Qualifying	72 holes over 2 days. 36 holes on each day.	Cut after 36 holes. Those 20 or more strokes behind the leader are excluded.	36 hole playoff.
1899	39th	98	No Qualifying	72 holes over 2 days. 36 holes on each day.	Cut after 36 holes. Those 20 or more strokes behind the leader are excluded.	36 hole playoff.
1898	38th	76	No Qualifying	72 holes over 2 days. 36 holes on each day.	Cut after 36 holes. Those 20 or more strokes behind the leader are excluded.	36 hole playoff.
1897	37th	88	No Qualifying	72 holes over 2 days. 36 holes on each day.	No Cut.	36 hole playoff.
1896	36th	63	No Qualifying	72 holes over 2 days. 36 holes on each day.	No Cut.	36 hole playoff.
1895	35th	73	No Qualifying	72 holes over 2 days. 36 holes on each day.	No Cut.	36 hole playoff.
1894	34th	94	No Qualifying	72 holes over 2 days. 36 holes on each day.	No Cut.	36 hole playoff.
1893	33rd	72	No Qualifying	72 holes over 2 days. 36 holes on each day.	No Cut.	36 hole playoff.
1892	32nd	60	No Qualifying	72 holes over 2 days. 36 holes on each day.	No Cut.	36 hole playoff.
1891	31st	84	No Qualifying	36 holes over 1 day.	No Cut.	36 hole playoff.
1890	30th	39	No Qualifying	36 holes over 1 day.	No Cut.	36 hole playoff.
1889	29th	48	No Qualifying	36 holes over 1 day.	No Cut.	36 hole playoff.
1888	28th	50	No Qualifying	36 holes over 1 day.	No Cut.	36 hole playoff.
1887	27th	40	No Qualifying	36 holes over 1 day.	No Cut.	36 hole playoff.
1886	26th	42	No Qualifying	36 holes over 1 day.	No Cut.	36 hole playoff.
1885	25th	60	No Qualifying	36 holes over 1 day.	No Cut.	36 hole playoff.
1884	24th	28	No Qualifying	36 holes over 1 day.	No Cut.	36 hole playoff.
1883	23rd	34	No Qualifying	36 holes over 1 day.	No Cut.	36 hole playoff.
1882	22nd	40	No Qualifying	36 holes over 1 day.	No Cut.	36 hole playoff.
1881	21st	22	No Qualifying	36 holes over 1 day.	No Cut.	36 hole playoff.
1880	20th	30	No Qualifying	36 holes over 1 day.	No Cut.	36 hole playoff.
1879	19th	47	No Qualifying	36 holes over 1 day.	No Cut.	36 hole playoff.
1878	18th	27	No Qualifying	36 holes over 1 day.	No Cut.	36 hole playoff.
1877	17th	24	No Qualifying	36 holes over 1 day.	No Cut.	36 hole playoff.
1876	16th	34	No Qualifying	36 holes over 1 day.	No Cut.	36 hole playoff.
1875	15th	18	No Qualifying	36 holes over 1 day.	No Cut.	36 hole playoff.
1874	14th	32	No Qualifying	36 holes over 1 day.	No Cut.	36 hole playoff.
1873	13th	27	No Qualifying	36 holes over 1 day.	No Cut.	36 hole playoff.
1872	12th	8	No Qualifying	36 holes over 1 day.	No Cut.	36 hole playoff.
1871	–	–	No Qualifying	36 holes over 1 day.	No Cut.	36 hole playoff.
1870	11th	20	No Qualifying	36 holes over 1 day.	No Cut.	36 hole playoff.
1869	10th	14	No Qualifying	36 holes over 1 day.	No Cut.	36 hole playoff.
1868	9th	12	No Qualifying	36 holes over 1 day.	No Cut.	36 hole playoff.
1867	8th	14	No Qualifying	36 holes over 1 day.	No Cut.	36 hole playoff.
1866	7th	16	No Qualifying	36 holes over 1 day.	No Cut.	36 hole playoff.
1865	6th	12	No Qualifying	36 holes over 1 day.	No Cut.	36 hole playoff.
1864	5th	16	No Qualifying	36 holes over 1 day.	No Cut.	36 hole playoff.
1863	4th	14	No Qualifying	36 holes over 1 day.	No Cut.	36 hole playoff.
1862	3rd	8	No Qualifying	36 holes over 1 day.	No Cut.	36 hole playoff.
1861	2nd	18	No Qualifying	36 holes over 1 day.	No Cut.	36 hole playoff.
1860	1st	8	Invitational	36 holes over 1 day.	No Cut.	36 hole playoff.
