= Wesley Bryan =

American professional golfer (born 1990)

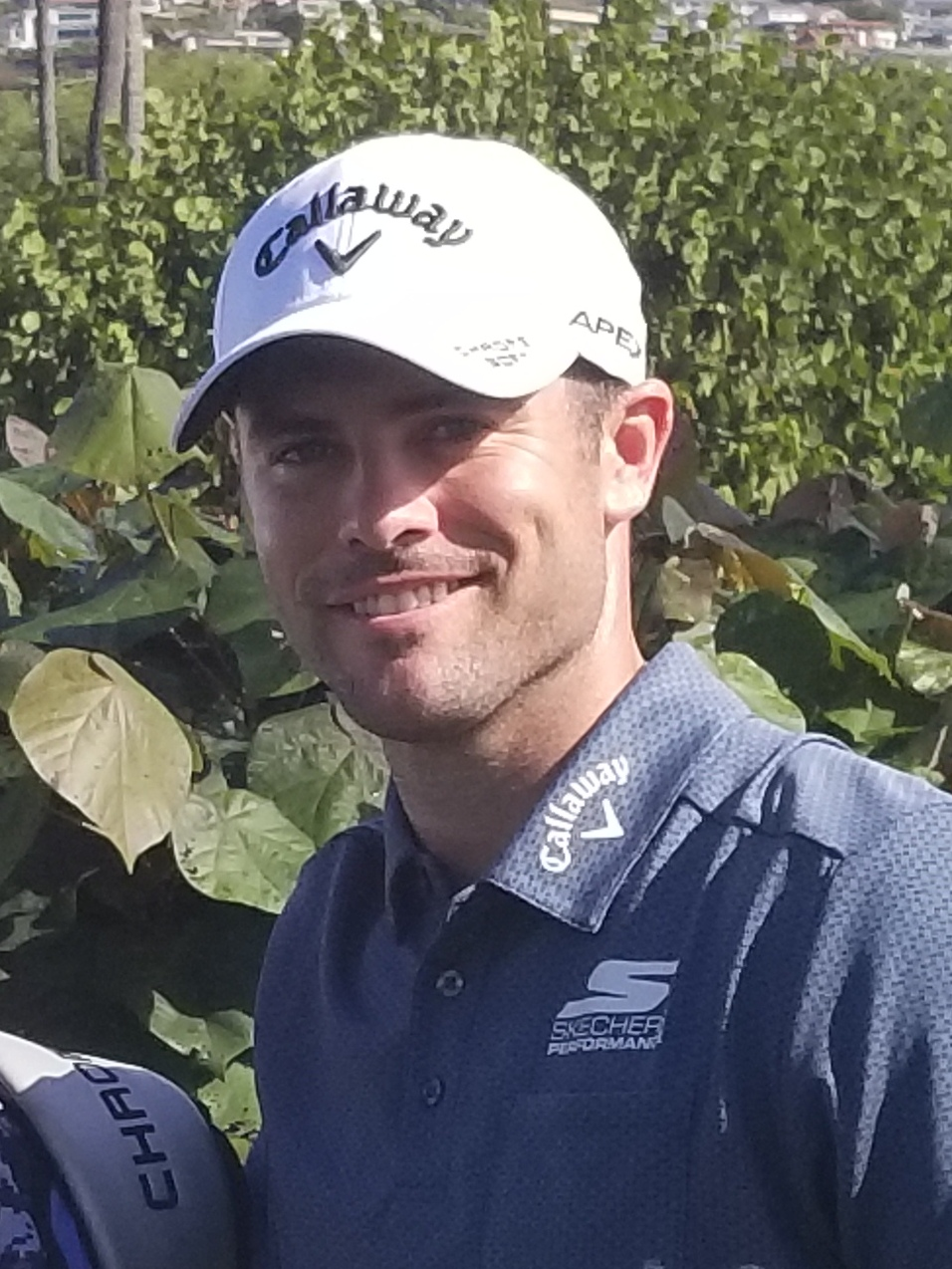
- Bryan in 2018

Personal information
- Full name: Donald Wesley Bryan
- Nationality: United States
- Born: March 26, 1990 (age 36) Columbia, South Carolina, U.S.
- Height: 6 ft 0 in (1.83 m)
- Weight: 175 lb (79 kg; 12.5 st)
- Spouse: Elizabeth Gray (m. 2012)
- Children: 3

Career
- Sport: Golf
- College: University of South Carolina
- Turned professional: 2012
- Former tours: PGA Tour; Korn Ferry Tour
- Professional wins: 4
- Highest ranking: 36 (April 30, 2017) (as of October 25, 2026)

Number of wins by tour
- PGA Tour: 1
- Korn Ferry Tour: 3

Best results in major championships
- Masters Tournament: CUT: 2018
- PGA Championship: CUT: 2017
- U.S. Open: CUT: 2017
- The Open Championship: CUT: 2017

Achievements and awards
- Web.com Tour regular season money list winner: 2016
- Web.com Tour Player of the Year: 2016

Donald Wesley Bryan (born March 26, 1990) is an American professional golfer and YouTuber who played on the PGA Tour.

== Early life ==
Bryan attended Dutch Fork High School in Irmo, South Carolina. He played college golf at the University of South Carolina, winning two events.

== Professional career ==
Bryan played on mini-tours before earning his Web.com Tour card for 2016 by finishing T-9 at qualifying school. In his third event of the 2016 season, he won the Chitimacha Louisiana Open.

He picked up a second win a month later at the El Bosque Mexico Championship. In August, he won his third event of the season, the Digital Ally Open, to earn promotion to the PGA Tour. He was the 11th golfer to do so. He won the Web.com Tour Player of the Year award.

On April 16, 2017, Bryan secured his first PGA Tour victory at the RBC Heritage and earned a spot at the 2018 Masters Tournament. He won by a single stroke over Luke Donald, after a final round of 67 moved him through the field from four strokes behind. With the win, Bryan moved up to 37th in the Official World Golf Ranking, his career-best ranking to date.

Over his career, he has achieved 15 top-10 finishes and 37 top-25 finishes on the PGA Tour, with total earnings exceeding $5.36 million.

In 2025, Bryan was suspended indefinitely from the PGA Tour due to his participation in the LIV Duels creator event. He was previously permitted to play in the Creator Classic, an amateur tournament for social media/YouTube golfers presented by the PGA Tour. He played in the first two Creator Classics, finishing in 2nd and 6th place respectively.

== Other activities ==
Bryan and his brother George started a YouTube channel featuring their golf trick-shot videos. They also appeared on the golf reality show Big Break The Palm Beaches, FL in 2015. George caddied for Wesley for his first Web.com Tour win. George is also a professional golfer and played on the 2017 PGA Tour Latinoamérica.

Bryan and his wife Elizabeth have three daughters, Hadley, Winnie, and Millie.

In 2023, brothers Wesley and George Bryan purchased Indian River Golf Club in South Congaree, South Carolina. The private golf course opened as Solina Golf Club in 2024.

In August 2025, he participated in the inaugural Internet Invitational presented by Barstool Sports and Bob Does Sports.

== Amateur wins ==
- 2008 Rees Jones Intercollegiate
- 2012 Seahawk Intercollegiate

== Professional wins (4) ==
=== PGA Tour wins (1) ===
No.	Date	Tournament	Winning score	To par	Margin of victory	Runner-up
1	Apr 16, 2017	RBC Heritage	69-67-68-67=271	−13	1 stroke	(England) Luke Donald

=== Web.com Tour wins (3) ===
No.	Date	Tournament	Winning score	To par	Margin of victory	Runner(s)-up
1	Mar 20, 2016	Chitimacha Louisiana Open	66-65-71-68=270	−14	1 stroke	(Argentina) Julián Etulain
2	Apr 24, 2016	El Bosque Mexico Championship	68-63-71-67=269	−19	4 strokes	(Canada) Brad Fritsch, (United States) Richy Werenski
3	Aug 7, 2016	Digital Ally Open	65-67-65-67=264	−20	Playoff	(United States) Grayson Murray, (United States) J. T. Poston

Web.com Tour playoff record (1–0)

No.	Year	Tournament	Opponents	Result
1	2016	Digital Ally Open	(United States) Grayson Murray, (United States) J. T. Poston	Won with birdie on second extra hole

== Results in major championships ==
Tournament	2017	2018
Masters Tournament		CUT
U.S. Open	CUT	
The Open Championship	CUT	
PGA Championship	CUT	

Did not play

CUT = missed the half-way cut
"T" = tied

== Results in The Players Championship ==
Tournament	2017	2018
The Players Championship	CUT	CUT

CUT = missed the halfway cut

== Results in World Golf Championships ==
Tournament	2017
Championship	
Match Play	
Invitational	T44
Champions	T62

Did not play

"T" = tied

== See also ==
- 2016 Web.com Tour Finals graduates
- List of golfers to achieve a three-win promotion from the Web.com Tour
