= Rhein Gibson =

Australian professional golfer (born 1986)

Personal information
- Nationality: Australia
- Born: 1 February 1986 (age 40) Bendigo, Victoria, Australia
- Height: 1.88 m (6 ft 2 in)
- Weight: 82 kg (181 lb; 12.9 st)
- Spouse: Nancy Gibson

Career
- Sport: Golf
- College: Oklahoma Christian University
- Turned professional: 2010
- Current tours: PGA Tour of Australasia; Korn Ferry Tour
- Former tours: PGA Tour; OneAsia Tour
- Professional wins: 6

Number of wins by tour
- Korn Ferry Tour: 2
- Other: 4

Best results in major championships
- Masters Tournament: DNP
- PGA Championship: DNP
- U.S. Open: DNP
- The Open Championship: 72nd: 2014

Rhein Gibson (/ˈriːɪn/ REE-in; born 1 February 1986) is an Australian professional golfer.

== Amateur career ==
Born in Bendigo, Victoria, and raised in Lismore, New South Wales, Gibson was a four-time NAIA All-American at Oklahoma Christian University.

== Professional career ==
Gibson made the cut at the 2014 Open Championship, where in the 3rd round he played in a group with Tiger Woods and Jordan Spieth. Gibson ultimately finished in 72nd place.

In December 2014, he finished fourth in the Web.com Tour qualifying tournament to earn a place on the 2015 Web.com Tour. In 2015 he finished 33rd in the regular season, then tenth (excluding the regular season Top 25) in the Web.com Finals to earn a place on the PGA Tour for 2015-16.

Gibson finished 199th on the FedEx Cup and 30th on the Web.com Tour money list, but his PGA Tour season was highlighted by a double eagle on the par-5 18th at the Barracuda Championship, worth eight points under the tournament's Modified Stableford scoring system. The shot was worth $50,000 to a Nevada charity, plus $50,000 to a charity of Gibson's choice. Gibson chose Maximum Chances, the autism charity of tournament winner and countryman Greg Chalmers.

In January 2018, an incident involving Gibson and his temporary caddie Brandon Davis caused controversy. Playing in The Bahamas Great Abaco Classic on the Web.com Tour, Gibson was caught on camera throwing his putter headcover at Davis after the caddie had picked his ball up in a hazard – resulting in a one-stroke penalty.

== World record ==
Gibson shot a 55 (−16) for a round of golf on 12 May 2012, at River Oaks Golf Club in Edmond, Oklahoma, setting a Guinness World Record.

== Amateur wins ==
- 2008 Oklahoma State Amateur

== Professional wins (6) ==
=== Korn Ferry Tour wins (2) ===
| No. | Date | Tournament | Winning score | Margin of victory | Runner-up |
|---|---|---|---|---|---|
| 1 | 9 Jun 2019 | BMW Charity Pro-Am | −21 (66-64-63=193) (Note: Shortened to 54 holes due to weather.) | 3 strokes | (United States) Michael Miller |
| 2 | 12 Feb 2023 | Astara Golf Championship | −16 (68-69-66-64=267) | 4 strokes | (United States) Kevin Dougherty |

Korn Ferry Tour playoff record (0–1)

| No. | Year | Tournament | Opponents | Result |
|---|---|---|---|---|
| 1 | 2016 | LECOM Health Challenge | (United States) Dominic Bozzelli, (United States) Rick Lamb, (Taiwan) Pan Cheng-tsung | Lamb won with birdie on second extra hole |

=== Mini-tour wins (2) ===
- 2012 Brickyard Open (Golfweek National Pro Tour)
- 2013 Avoca Classic (NGA Hooters Tour)

=== Other wins (2) ===
- 2010 Oklahoma Open
- 2013 Arkansas Open

== Results in major championships ==
| Tournament | 2014 |
|---|---|
| Masters Tournament | |
| U.S. Open | |
| The Open Championship | 72 |
| PGA Championship | |

Did not play

CUT = missed the half-way cut
"T" = tied

== See also ==
- 2015 Web.com Tour Finals graduates
- 2019 Korn Ferry Tour Finals graduates
