= Pan Cheng-tsung =

Taiwanese professional golfer (born 1991)

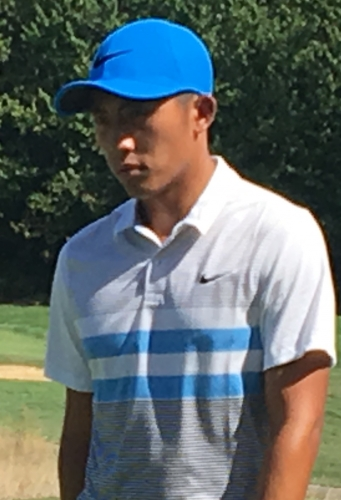
- Pan in 2016

Personal information
- Nickname: The Bread Man
- Nationality: Chinese Taipei
- Born: 12 November 1991 (age 34) Miaoli County, Taiwan
- Height: 5 ft 7 in (170 cm)
- Weight: 145 lb (66 kg)

Career
- Sport: Golf
- College: University of Washington
- Turned professional: 2015
- Current tour: PGA Tour
- Former tours: PGA Tour Canada; Web.com Tour
- Professional wins: 3
- Highest ranking: 47 (23 June 2019) (as of 25 October 2026)

Number of wins by tour
- PGA Tour: 1
- Other: 2

Best results in major championships
- Masters Tournament: T7: 2020
- PGA Championship: CUT: 2019, 2020, 2024
- U.S. Open: T45: 2013
- The Open Championship: CUT: 2014, 2019, 2021, 2024
Medal record
Representing Chinese Taipei
Olympic Games
Bronze medal – third place	2020 Tokyo	Individual
Asian Games
Silver medal – second place	2006 Doha	Individual
Bronze medal – third place	2006 Doha	Men's team
Gold medal – first place	2014 Incheon	Individual
Gold medal – first place	2014 Incheon	Men's team

Pan Cheng-tsung
- Chinese: 潘政琮
Transcriptions
Standard Mandarin
- Hanyu Pinyin: Pān Zhèngcóng
- IPA: [pʰán ʈʂə̂ŋ.tsʰʊ̌ŋ]

Pan Cheng-tsung (Chinese: 潘政琮, born 12 November 1991), known professionally as C. T. Pan, is a Taiwanese professional golfer who currently competes on the PGA Tour.

In 2019, Pan became just the second Taiwanese golfer to win on the PGA Tour. He has represented Taiwan as an amateur on the 2006 Eisenhower Trophy team, and then again in the 2014 tournament. He won two gold medals in golf – one individually and one for team play – at the 2014 Asian Games, represented Taiwan in the 2016 World Cup of Golf and played in the 2019 Presidents Cup for the international team. He won a bronze medal for Taiwan in the 2020 Olympics.

== Early and personal life ==
Pan was born in Miaoli County, Taiwan. His father, a caddie who guided Pan into the sport, died in 2010. Pan was enrolled at the IMG Golf Academy for three years prior to attending the University of Washington.

He is married to Michelle Lin, who briefly served as his caddie. Mike "Fluff" Cowan now caddies for Pan.

== College career ==
Pan played college golf at the University of Washington where he won eight events. He was the number one amateur golfer in the World Amateur Golf Ranking for eight weeks in 2013.

== Professional career ==
Pan was one of two local golfers to make the cut at the 2015 U.S. Open at Chambers Bay in University Place, Washington. He finished tied for 64th in the tournament. Pan earned his first professional win on 12 July 2015 at The Players Cup on PGA Tour Canada, his second tournament on the tour and fourth tournament as a pro.

In December 2015, Pan tied for 14th at the final stage of the Web.com Tour qualifying tournament. He then finished 11th in the 2016 Web.com Tour season earnings, which got him a PGA Tour card for the 2017 season.

=== 2017 ===
In 2017, Pan competed in 29 PGA Tour events, making the cut in 14, including 3 top-10 finishes. His best finish was a tie for second on January 29 at the Farmers Insurance Open at Torrey Pines in San Diego, California. For the season, he earned $1,267,649 in official money and finished 88th in the FedEx Cup standings.

=== 2018 ===
In 2018, Pan competed in 30 PGA Tour events, making the cut in 22, including 2 top-10 finishes. His best finish was a tie for second on August 19, 2018, at the Wyndham Championship at Sedgefield Country Club in Greensboro, North Carolina. For the season, he earned $1,881,787 in official money and finished 35th in the FedEx Cup standings.

=== 2019 ===
On 21 April 2019, Pan earned his first PGA Tour victory at the RBC Heritage on Hilton Head Island, South Carolina. He became the second Taiwanese golfer to win on the PGA Tour after Chen Tze-chung who won at the 1987 Los Angeles Open.

In December 2019, Pan played on the International team at the 2019 Presidents Cup at Royal Melbourne Golf Club in Australia. The U.S. team won 16–14. Pan went 2–1–0 and lost his Sunday singles match against Patrick Reed.

=== 2020 ===
Pan spent the year on the PGA Tour, with the highlight being a tie for 7th in the 2020 Masters Tournament, his first appearance at Augusta, including a final round of 68 (−4). Pan took advantage of the opportunity, trying all the sandwiches at the clubhouse, declaring the egg salad sandwich his favorite.

=== 2021 ===
In August 2021, Pan earned a bronze medal in the 2020 Olympics. He finished on −15, despite shooting +3 in round 1. He defeated 6 other players in the bronze medal tiebreaker, securing the medal with a par on the fourth extra hole.

== Amateur wins ==
- 2011 Azalea Invitational, Prestige at PGA West
- 2012 Kikkor Golf Husky Invitational
- 2013 NCAA Tallahassee Regional, Kikkor Golf Husky Invitational
- 2014 Asian Games
- 2015 The Amer Ari Invitational, Querencia Cabo Collegiate, Lamkin Grips SD Classic (tie), NCAA Bremerton Regional

== Professional wins (3) ==
=== PGA Tour wins (1) ===
No.	Date	Tournament	Winning score	Margin of victory	Runner-up
1	21 Apr 2019	RBC Heritage	−12 (71-65-69-67=272)	1 stroke	(United States) Matt Kuchar

=== PGA Tour Canada wins (2) ===
No.	Date	Tournament	Winning score	Margin of victory	Runner(s)-up
1	12 Jul 2015	The Players Cup	−15 (71-67-65-66=269)	2 strokes	(Sweden) Robert S. Karlsson, (United States) J. J. Spaun
2	13 Sep 2015	Cape Breton Celtic Classic	−19 (67-68-68-66=269)	Playoff	(Canada) Taylor Pendrith

== Playoff record ==
Web.com Tour playoff record (0–1)

No.	Year	Tournament	Opponents	Result
1	2016	LECOM Health Challenge	(United States) Dominic Bozzelli, (Australia) Rhein Gibson, (United States) Rick Lamb	Lamb won with birdie on second extra hole

== Results in major championships ==
Results not in chronological order in 2020.

Tournament	2011	2012	2013	2014	2015	2016	2017	2018
Masters Tournament								
U.S. Open	CUT		T45		T64		CUT	
The Open Championship				CUT				
PGA Championship								

Tournament	2019	2020	2021	2022	2023	2024
Masters Tournament		T7	CUT			
PGA Championship	CUT	CUT				CUT
U.S. Open	CUT					
The Open Championship	CUT	NT	CUT			CUT

Top 10
Did not play

CUT = missed the half-way cut
"T" = tied
NT = no tournament due to COVID-19 pandemic

=== Summary ===
Tournament	Wins	2nd	3rd	Top-5	Top-10	Top-25	Events	Cuts made
Masters Tournament	0	0	0	0	1	1	2	1
PGA Championship	0	0	0	0	0	0	3	0
U.S. Open	0	0	0	0	0	0	5	2
The Open Championship	0	0	0	0	0	0	4	0
Totals	0	0	0	0	1	1	14	3

- Most consecutive cuts made – 1 (three times)
- Longest streak of top-10s – 1

== Results in The Players Championship ==
Tournament	2018	2019	2020	2021	2022	2023	2024	2025
The Players Championship	T46	T72	C	CUT	CUT		T42	T69

Did not play

"T" indicates a tie for a place
CUT = missed the halfway cut
C = Cancelled after the first round due to the COVID-19 pandemic

== Results in World Golf Championships ==
Tournament	2018	2019	2020
Championship			
Match Play			NT^{1}
Invitational		T48	T72
Champions	T22		NT^{1}

^{1}Cancelled due to COVID-19 pandemic

Did not play

NT = No tournament
"T" indicates a tie for a place.

== Team appearances ==
Amateur

- Eisenhower Trophy (representing Taiwan): 2006, 2014

Professional

- World Cup (representing Taiwan): 2016
- Presidents Cup (representing the International team): 2019

== See also ==
- 2016 Web.com Tour Finals graduates
