= Lee In-woo =

South Korean golfer

Personal information
- Nationality: South Korea
- Born: 19 May 1972 (age 54) Seoul, South Korea
- Height: 1.70 m (5 ft 7 in)
- Weight: 65 kg (143 lb; 10.2 st)

Career
- Sport: Golf
- Status: Professional
- Current tour: Korean Tour
- Professional wins: 2

Number of wins by tour
- Asian Tour: 1
- Other: 1

Lee In-woo (Korean: 이인우; born 19 May 1972) is a South Korean professional golfer.

Lee plays mainly on the OneAsia Tour and the Korean Tour. He won the 2012 Volvik Hildesheim Open, co-sanctioned by the Asian Tour and the Korean Tour.

== Professional wins (2) ==
=== Asian Tour wins (1) ===
No.	Date	Tournament	Winning score	Margin of victory	Runners-up
1	24 Jun 2012	Volvik Hildesheim Open^{1}	−12 (71-68-69-68=276)	1 stroke	(South Korea) Lee Sang-hee, (Thailand) Thaworn Wiratchant

^{1}Co-sanctioned by the Korean Tour

=== Korean Tour wins (2) ===
No.	Date	Tournament	Winning score	Margin of victory	Runner(s)-up
1	11 Sep 2005	Kia Lotze Vivaldi Park Open	−16 (66-67-69-70=272)	1 stroke	(South Korea) Park No-seok
2	24 Jun 2012	Volvik Hildesheim Open^{1}	−12 (71-68-69-68=276)	1 stroke	(South Korea) Lee Sang-hee, (Thailand) Thaworn Wiratchant

^{1}Co-sanctioned by the Asian Tour
