= 2016 Web.com Tour Finals graduates =

This is a list of golfers who graduated from the Web.com Tour Finals in 2016. The top 25 players on the Web.com Tour's regular season money list in 2016 earned PGA Tour cards for 2017. The Finals determined the other 25 players to earn their PGA Tour cards and their priority order. Due to the cancellation of the Web.com Tour Championship because of Hurricane Matthew, the Finals consisted of only three events.

As in previous seasons, the Finals featured the top 75 players on the Web.com Tour regular season money list, players ranked 126–200 on the PGA Tour's FedEx Cup regular season points list (except players exempt through other means), non-members of the PGA Tour with enough FedExCup regular season points to place 126–200, and special medical exemptions.

To determine the initial 2017 PGA Tour priority rank, the top 25 Web.com Tour regular season players were alternated with the top 25 Web.com Tour Finals players. This priority order was then reshuffled several times during the 2017 season.

Wesley Bryan and Grayson Murray were fully exempt for the 2016–17 PGA Tour season after leading the full-season and Finals money lists, respectively.

== 2016 Web.com Tour ==
Player	2016 Web.com Tour regular season		2016 FedEx Cup	2016 Web.com Tour Finals				The 25 Regular + Finals		Priority rank
Player	Rank	Earnings ($)	2016 FedEx Cup	Rank	Without The 25	Earnings ($)	Best finish	Rank	Earnings ($)	Priority rank
(United States) Wesley Bryan*^{#}	1	449,392	196	n/a		0	CUT	1	449,392	Exempt
(United States) Grayson Murray*	18	159,963		1		248,000	Win	2	407,963	Exempt
(United States) Michael Thompson			145	2	1	184,000	Win			1
(United States) J. J. Spaun*	3	350,832		T57		12,600	T18	3	363,432	2
(United States) Bryson DeChambeau^{†}				3	2	180,000	Win			3
(United States) Richy Werenski*	2	351,770		T99		3,050	T46	4	354,820	4
(Australia) Cameron Smith			157	4	3	114,910	2			5
(United States) Martin Flores	5	281,403		12		64,910	T3	5	346,313	6
(Argentina) Miguel Ángel Carballo	106	37,537	187	5	4	108,000	2			7
(United States) Ryan Brehm*	4	281,809		85		5,620	T50	6	287,428	8
(United States) Andres Gonzales			154	6	5	106,267	T2			9
(United States) Ollie Schniederjans*	6	279,127		110		2,560	T61	7	281,687	10
(United States) Scott Stallings			128	9	6	75,505	T5			11
(United States) Nicholas Lindheim*	21	158,654		7		83,093	T2	8	241,746	12
(United States) Zack Sucher	38	130,333		10	7	71,018	5			13
(Argentina) Julián Etulain*	20	158,860		8		77,617	T2	9	236,477	14
(United States) Will MacKenzie			151	11	8	67,500	T5			15
(United States) Trey Mullinax*	8	212,016		38		23,352	T13	10	235,368	16
(United States) Kevin Tway	27	148,746		13	9	63,975	T3			17
(Taiwan) Pan Cheng-tsung*	11	204,075		27		29,875	T9	11	233,950	18
(England) Andrew Johnston*				14	10	54,910	4			19
(Republic of Ireland) Séamus Power*	9	209,590		T52		14,500	T16	12	224,090	20
(Australia) Rod Pampling			195	15	11	52,033	T10			21
(United States) Dominic Bozzelli*	7	214,307		T94		4,410	T38	13	218,717	22
(Spain) Gonzalo Fernández-Castaño	64	74,103		16	12	49,926	T9			23
(United States) J. T. Poston*	10	205,597		66		10,385	T31	14	215,982	24
(United States) Ryan Blaum*	33	137,131		17	13	49,100	T5			25
(Canada) Mackenzie Hughes*	17	167,369		20		42,070	T5	15	209,439	26
(New Zealand) Steven Alker	67	72,036		18	14	43,600	8			27
(United States) Jonathan Randolph	13	195,248		T57		12,600	T18	16	207,848	28
(United States) Xander Schauffele*	26	149,292		19	15	42,395	T9			29
(United States) Ryan Armour	12	200,629		n/a		0	CUT	17	200,629	30
(Australia) Brett Drewitt*	55	86,866		21	16	42,035	T5			31
(Canada) Brad Fritsch	14	194,857		n/a		0	CUT	18	194,857	32
(United States) D. A. Points	198	2,188	184	22	17	37,950	T6			33
(United States) Brian Campbell*	15	180,324		T87		5,475	T33	19	185,799	34
(South Korea) Kim Meen-whee			127	23	18	36,975	T9			35
(United States) Rick Lamb*	24	154,368		30		28,286	T10	20	182,654	36
(United States) Kelly Kraft	162	10,500	165	T24	T19	35,125	T5			37
(United States) Cody Gribble*	53	89,326		T24	T19	35,125	T5			38
(United States) Brandon Hagy^{†}	19	158,966		T44		19,000	T12	21	177,966	39
(United States) Max Homa	23	155,653		T44		19,000	T12	22	174,653	40
(South Africa) Rory Sabbatini			191	26	21	32,375	T6			41
(United States) Mark Anderson	16	169,499		T107		2,610	T59	23	172,109	42
(United States) Bobby Wyatt*				28	22	29,603	T12			43
(Colombia) Sebastián Muñoz*	22	156,671		n/a		0	CUT	24	156,671	44
(United States) Tag Ridings	52	91,417		29	23	28,493	T12			45
(United States) Joel Dahmen*	25	150,267		n/a		0	DNP	25	150,267	46
(Australia) Cameron Percy	121	28,600	168	31	24	27,560	T10			47
(New Zealand) Tim Wilkinson			132	32	25	27,425	T12			48

- *PGA Tour rookie in 2017
- ^{†}First-time PGA Tour member in 2017, but ineligible for rookie status due to having played eight or more Tour events in a previous season
- ^{#}Received a three-win promotion to the PGA Tour during 2016 season
- Earned spot in Finals through PGA Tour.
- Earned spot in Finals through FedEx Cup points earned as a PGA Tour non-member.
- Indicates whether the player earned his card through the regular season or through the Finals.

== Results on 2016–17 PGA Tour ==
Player	Starts	Cuts made	Best finish	Money list rank	Earnings ($)	FedEx Cup rank
(United States) Wesley Bryan*	28	19	Win	38	2,495,751	41
(United States) Grayson Murray*	30	18	Win	75	1,468,728	66
(United States) Michael Thompson	21	9	T10	150	568,991	148
(United States) J. J. Spaun*	29	18	T4	96	1,122,611	97
(United States) Bryson DeChambeau^{†}	31	14	Win	58	1,817,054	49
(United States) Richy Werenski*	26	16	T2	111	890,262	106
(Australia) Cameron Smith	26	16	Win	44	2,123,216	46
(United States) Martin Flores	27	18	T7	119	830,057	103
(Argentina) Miguel Ángel Carballo	22	9	T14	198	186,623	201
(United States) Ryan Brehm*	25	17	T18	166	396,258	164
(United States) Andres Gonzales	24	13	T10	161	422,078	158
(United States) Ollie Schniederjans*	28	19	2	52	1,935,669	60
(United States) Scott Stallings	27	14	T3	106	955,337	101
(United States) Nicholas Lindheim*	21	9	T23	201	175,107	197
(United States) Zack Sucher	14	3	T42	226	35,135	227
(Argentina) Julián Etulain*	22	13	T5	159	448,214	161
(United States) Will MacKenzie	16	8	T14	183	272,288	183
(United States) Trey Mullinax*	28	16	T9	131	758,141	137
(United States) Kevin Tway	27	21	3/T3	74	1,472,613	69
(Taiwan) Pan Cheng-tsung*	29	14	T2	87	1,267,649	88
(England) Andrew Johnston*	13	8	T10	179	293,233	189
(Republic of Ireland) Séamus Power*	25	19	T10	143	646,180	130
(Australia) Rod Pampling	22	13	Win	73	1,539,422	74
(United States) Dominic Bozzelli*	24	10	T3	113	868,519	119
(Spain) Gonzalo Fernández-Castaño	22	10	T13	186	258,162	188
(United States) J. T. Poston*	28	20	T10	142	662,565	132
(United States) Ryan Blaum*	29	22	T6	104	962,768	107
(Canada) Mackenzie Hughes*	31	22	Win	41	2,355,553	36
(New Zealand) Steven Alker	23	12	T25	191	218,681	186
(United States) Jonathan Randolph	22	13	T8	154	511,032	160
(United States) Xander Schauffele*	28	20	Winx2	12	4,312,674	3
(United States) Ryan Armour	20	11	T4	160	443,006	159
(Australia) Brett Drewitt*	19	9	T27	199	184,388	196
(Canada) Brad Fritsch	18	10	T29	203	166,440	204
(United States) D. A. Points	22	12	Win	110	893,700	104
(United States) Brian Campbell*	20	7	T12	188	237,537	180
(South Korea) Kim Meen-whee	27	11	T2	95	1,125,368	89
(United States) Rick Lamb*	19	8	T3	153	524,372	150
(United States) Kelly Kraft	27	12	2	66	1,638,045	72
(United States) Cody Gribble*	28	11	Win	85	1,305,554	87
(United States) Brandon Hagy^{†}	26	17	T5	116	861,227	113
(United States) Max Homa	17	2	71	235	18,008	244
(South Africa) Rory Sabbatini	23	13	T4	133	741,617	124
(United States) Mark Anderson	20	6	T10	197	188,806	194
(United States) Bobby Wyatt*	20	4	T57	227	33,139	230
(Colombia) Sebastián Muñoz*	17	8	T3	151	563,900	153
(United States) Tag Ridings	20	15	T3	156	489,927	155
(United States) Joel Dahmen*	16	7	T9	171	344,824	176
(Australia) Cameron Percy	23	14	T10	145	623,694	144
(New Zealand) Tim Wilkinson	22	11	T14x2	164	411,459	156

- *PGA Tour rookie in 2017
- ^{†}First-time PGA Tour member in 2017, but ineligible for rookie status due to having played eight or more Tour events in a previous season
- Retained his PGA Tour card for 2018: won or finished in the top 125 of the FedEx Cup points list.
- Retained PGA Tour conditional status and qualified for the Web.com Tour Finals: finished between 126 and 150 on FedEx Cup list and qualified for Web.com Tour Finals.
- Failed to retain his PGA Tour card for 2018 but qualified for the Web.com Tour Finals: finished between 150 and 200 on FedEx Cup list.
- Failed to retain his PGA Tour card for 2018 and to qualify for the Web.com Tour Finals: finished outside the top 200 on FedEx Cup list.

Nicholas Lindheim, Séamus Power, Jonathan Randolph, Ryan Armour, and Joel Dahmen regained their cards through the 2017 Web.com Tour Finals.

== Winners on the PGA Tour in 2017 ==
No.	Date	Player	Tournament	Winning score	Margin of victory	Runners-up	Payout ($)
1	Oct 30, 2016	(United States) Cody Gribble	Sanderson Farms Championship	−20 (73-63-67-65=268)	4 strokes	(United States) Chris Kirk (United States) Luke List (England) Greg Owen	756,000
2	Nov 6, 2016	(Australia) Rod Pampling	Shriners Hospitals for Children Open	−20 (60-68-71-65=264)	2 strokes	(United States) Brooks Koepka	1,188,000
3	Nov 21, 2016	(Canada) Mackenzie Hughes	RSM Classic	−17 (61-67-68-69=265)	Playoff	(United States) Blayne Barber (United States) Billy Horschel (Sweden) Henrik Norlander (Colombia) Camilo Villegas	1,080,000
4	Mar 26	(United States) D. A. Points	Puerto Rico Open	−20 (64-69-69-66=268)	2 strokes	(United States) Bryson DeChambeau (South Africa) Retief Goosen (United States) Bill Lunde	540,000
5	Apr 16	(United States) Wesley Bryan	RBC Heritage	−13 (69-67-68-67=271)	1 stroke	(England) Luke Donald	1,170,000
6	May 1	(Australia) Cameron Smith with (Sweden) Jonas Blixt	Zurich Classic of New Orleans	−27 (67-62-68-64=261)	Playoff	(United States) Scott Brown & (United States) Kevin Kisner	1,022,400
7	Jul 9	(United States) Xander Schauffele	Greenbrier Classic	−14 (64-69-66-67=266)	1 stroke	(United States) Robert Streb	1,278,000
8	Jul 16	(United States) Bryson DeChambeau	John Deere Classic	−18 (66-65-70-65=266)	1 stroke	(United States) Patrick Rodgers	1,008,000
9	Jul 23	(United States) Grayson Murray	Barbasol Championship	−21 (67-64-64-68=263)	1 stroke	(United States) Chad Collins	630,000
10	Sep 24	(United States) Xander Schauffele (2)	Tour Championship	−12 (69-66-65-68=268)	1 stroke	(United States) Justin Thomas	1,575,000

== Runners-up on the PGA Tour in 2017 ==
No.	Date	Player	Tournament	Winner	Winning score	Runner-up score	Payout ($)
1	Jan 29	(Taiwan) Pan Cheng-tsung	Farmers Insurance Open	(Spain) Jon Rahm	−13 (72-69-69-65=275)	−10 (70-69-69-70=278)	589,600
2	Feb 12	(United States) Kelly Kraft	AT&T Pebble Beach Pro-Am	(United States) Jordan Spieth	−19 (68-65-65-70=268)	−15 (69-70-66-67=272)	777,600
3	Mar 26	(United States) Bryson DeChambeau	Puerto Rico Open	(United States) D. A. Points	−20 (64-69-69-66=268)	−18 (68-65-70-67=270)	224,000
4	Jun 11	(South Korea) Kim Meen-whee	FedEx St. Jude Classic	(United States) Daniel Berger	−10 (70-68-66-66=270)	−9 (69-66-69-67=271)	563,200
5	Aug 6	(United States) Richy Werenski; Lost in three-man playoff	Barracuda Championship	(United States) Chris Stroud	44 points (9-3-12-20)	44 points (11-15-4-14)	290,400
6	Aug 20	(United States) Ollie Schniederjans	Wyndham Championship	(Sweden) Henrik Stenson	−22 (62-66-66-64=258)	−21 (66-63-66-64=259)	626,400
