= Monday qualifier =

Professional golf tournament terminology

A Monday qualifier is a stroke play golf tournament held on the Monday before a professional golf tournament that awards top finishers entry into the professional tournament. Those who enter the Monday qualifiers are those with no status on the tour sponsoring the event or too far down the tour's priority list to earn direct entry. The players who earn entry into the professional tournament in this manner are also called Monday qualifiers. In the 1960s, players vying to become Monday qualifiers for a tour event were informally referred to as "rabbits", a term they found disparaging.

In the United States, both the PGA Tour and Korn Ferry Tour offer Monday qualifiers for most events. On the PGA Tour, an 18-hole pre-qualifier for entry into each Monday qualifier is also held before the Monday qualifier. The entry fee for a PGA Tour pre-qualifier to the Monday qualifier is $200 and the entry fee for the PGA Tour Monday qualifier is an additional $200.

The PGA Tour awards four spots via Monday qualifying for most of its events, excluding those classified as invitationals. If there is a tie between fourth and fifth place after eighteen holes, sudden death holes are played until there are exactly four qualifiers. The PGA Tour does not run the majors and thus does not run qualifying tournaments for these tournaments. However, the USGA and R&A have their own systems of qualifying rounds for the U.S. Open and The Open Championship respectively, while the PGA Professional Championship {a tournament for American golf club professionals and teachers who are members of the PGA of America) acts as a qualifier for the PGA Championship.

On the Korn Ferry Tour, the entry fee for a Monday qualifier is $450; there is no pre-qualifier. The Korn Ferry Tour awards spots in the main professional tournament to the top 12–14 finishers in the Monday qualifier depending on the tournament.

Since the PGA Tour's standard number of Monday qualifiers was reduced to four in 1983, four Monday qualifiers have gone on to win the tournament:

Year	Tournament	Player	Ref
1986	Honda Classic	(United States) Kenny Knox	
1986	Southern Open	(United States) Fred Wadsworth	
2010	Wyndham Championship	(India) Arjun Atwal	
2019	Valero Texas Open	(Canada) Corey Conners	

Three Monday qualifiers have won on the LPGA Tour: Laurel Kean at the 2000 State Farm Rail Classic, Brooke Henderson at the 2015 Cambia Portland Classic, and Chanettee Wannasaen at the 2023 Portland Classic. The feat is more common on the Korn Ferry Tour, having happened three times since 2011: Ted Potter Jr. at the 2011 South Georgia Classic, Sebastian Cappelen at the 2014 Air Capital Classic, and Rick Lamb at the 2016 LECOM Health Challenge. Monday qualifiers have won 15 times on PGA Tour Champions – Tommy Gainey on October 5, 2025, at the Constellation Furyk and Friends.
