= Dominic Bozzelli =

American professional golfer (born 1991)

Personal information
- Full name: Dominic Jordan Bozzelli
- Nationality: United States
- Born: May 22, 1991 (age 35) Rochester, New York, U.S.
- Height: 6 ft 0 in (1.83 m)
- Weight: 175 lb (79 kg; 12.5 st)

Career
- Sport: Golf
- College: University of Central Florida; Auburn University
- Turned professional: 2013
- Former tours: PGA Tour; Korn Ferry Tour; NGA Pro Golf Tour
- Professional wins: 5

Number of wins by tour
- Korn Ferry Tour: 1
- Other: 4

Dominic Jordan Bozzelli (born May 22, 1991) is an American professional golfer.

Bozzelli was born in Rochester, New York. He played college golf at Auburn University after transferring from University of Central Florida. At Auburn, he won three events. He also won the Eastern Amateur and the New York State Amateur twice.

Bozzelli turned professional in 2013 and played on the NGA Pro Golf Tour in 2014, winning four times (including three straight), and earning NGA Player of the Year and Rookie of the Year honors. He also played five Web.com Tour events in 2014, finishing in the top-10 twice. He gained his 2015 Web.com Tour card through qualifying school and picked up his first Tour win in June 2016 at the Corales Puntacana Resort and Club Championship.

== Amateur wins ==
- 2010 Eastern Amateur
- 2011 New York State Amateur, U.S. Collegiate Championship
- 2012 SunTrust Gator Invitational, New York State Amateur
- 2013 The Amer Ari Invitational

== Professional wins (5) ==
=== Web.com Tour wins (1) ===
No.	Date	Tournament	Winning score	Margin of victory	Runners-up
1	Jun 5, 2016	Corales Puntacana Resort and Club Championship	−24 (69-63-64-68=264)	4 strokes	(United States) Blake Adams, (Mexico) Roberto Díaz, (United States) Sam Ryder

Web.com Tour playoff record (0–1)

No.	Year	Tournament	Opponents	Result
1	2016	LECOM Health Challenge	(Australia) Rhein Gibson, (United States) Rick Lamb, (Taiwan) Pan Cheng-tsung	Lamb won with birdie on second extra hole

=== Other wins (4) ===
- 2014 Spring Hill Classic, NGA Tour Classic, Lake County Classic, Southern Ontario Open (all NGA Pro Golf Tour)

== See also ==
- 2016 Web.com Tour Finals graduates
