= Ollie Schniederjans =

American professional golfer (born 1993)

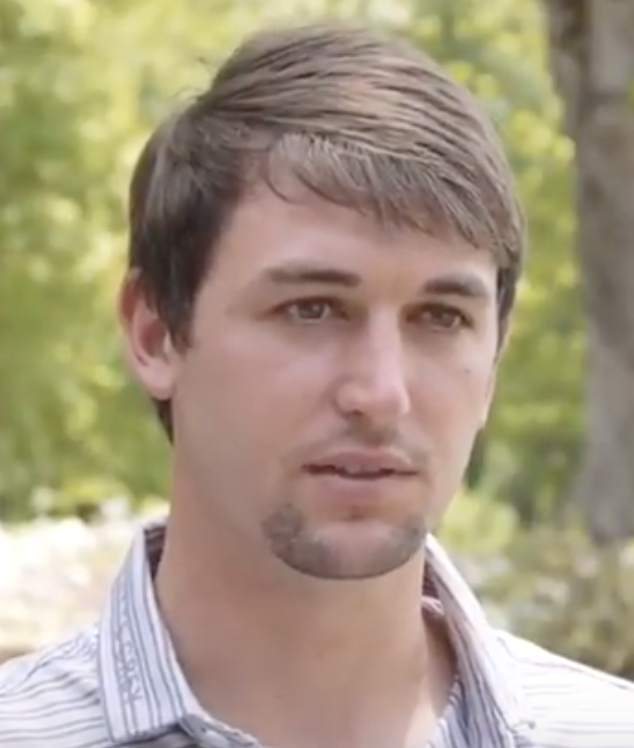
- Schniederjans in 2018

Personal information
- Full name: Oliver Frank Schniederjans
- Nationality: United States
- Born: June 15, 1993 (age 33) Dallas, Texas, U.S.
- Height: 6 ft 1 in (1.85 m)
- Weight: 168 lb (76 kg; 12.0 st)

Career
- Sport: Golf
- College: Georgia Tech
- Turned professional: 2015
- Current tour: Asian Tour
- Former tours: PGA Tour; Korn Ferry Tour
- Professional wins: 2
- Highest ranking: 77 (February 4, 2018) (as of October 25, 2026)

Number of wins by tour
- Asian Tour: 1
- Korn Ferry Tour: 1

Best results in major championships
- Masters Tournament: DNP
- PGA Championship: T59: 2018
- U.S. Open: T42: 2015
- The Open Championship: T12: 2015

Achievements and awards
- Mark H. McCormack Medal: 2014
- Asian Tour Rookie of the Year: 2025

Oliver Frank Schniederjans (born June 15, 1993) is an American professional golfer. He was a three-time NCAA All-American at Georgia Tech. He is a former number one ranked amateur golfer in the world.

== Amateur career ==
Schniederjans was born in Dallas, Texas, to Oliver and Linda Schniederjans. He lived briefly in North Andover, Massachusetts, and grew up in Powder Springs, Georgia. He graduated in 2010 from Harrison High School in Kennesaw, Georgia, and played college golf at Georgia Tech.

As a junior, Schniederjans won five of six events leading up to the NCAA Division I Championship, where he finished runner-up after a three-hole playoff. He won the 2014 Mark H. McCormack Medal after reaching number one in the World Amateur Golf Ranking, a position he held for 41 consecutive weeks. A two-time Atlantic Coast Conference (ACC) Player of the Year, Schniederjans was named first-team All-American following his junior and senior seasons and played for the U.S. Palmer Cup team in 2014 and 2015.

He played his first PGA Tour event at the 2015 Valspar Championship, missing the cut. As the McCormack winner, he earned exemptions into the 2015 U.S. Open and the 2015 Open Championship, after which he turned professional.

== Professional career ==
Schniederjans made his professional debut at the 2015 RBC Canadian Open. In June 2016, he won for the first time as a professional, at the Air Capital Classic on the Web.com Tour, and finished the season having gained status on the PGA Tour for 2017. He retained his place on the PGA Tour for three seasons, his best result being a runner-up finish in the Wyndham Championship during his rookie season, before dropping back down to the second tier tour in 2020, where he remained through 2024.

In December 2024, Schniederjans finished in a tie for fourth place in the LIV Golf promotions event to miss out on the one spot available in the league, but he did gain exemptions into all the Asian Tour International Series tournaments in 2025. He later accepted an offer to be a reserve player on the 2025 LIV Golf League. In February 2025, he won the International Series India by four strokes from Bryson DeChambeau in his debut on the Asian Tour International Series. The following week, he made his LIV Golf debut, as a substitute for the injured HyFlyers GC captain Phil Mickelson, in the first event of the season in Riyadh. At the end of the 2025 Asian Tour season, he was named as the Rookie of the Year.

== Amateur wins ==
- 2009 Polo Golf Junior Classic, Jones Cup Junior Invitational
- 2013 Carpet Capital Collegiate (tie), U.S. Collegiate Championship
- 2014 Valspar Collegiate, Robert Kepler Invitational (tie), ACC Championship, Carpet Capital Collegiate

== Professional wins (2) ==
=== Asian Tour wins (1) ===
Legend
International Series (1)
Other Asian Tour (0)

No.	Date	Tournament	Winning score	Margin of victory	Runner-up
1	Feb 2, 2025	International Series India	−10 (71-69-69-69=278)	4 strokes	(United States) Bryson DeChambeau

=== Web.com Tour wins (1) ===
No.	Date	Tournament	Winning score	Margin of victory	Runners-up
1	Jun 26, 2016	Air Capital Classic	−17 (68-67-61-67=263)	Playoff	(United States) Collin Morikawa (a), (United States) J. J. Spaun

Web.com Tour playoff record (1–1)

No.	Year	Tournament	Opponent(s)	Result
1	2016	Servientrega Championship	(Canada) Brad Fritsch	Lost to par on first extra hole
2	2016	Air Capital Classic	(United States) Collin Morikawa (a), (United States) J. J. Spaun	Won with birdie on second extra hole

== Results in major championships ==
Tournament	2015	2016	2017	2018
Masters Tournament				
U.S. Open	T42			CUT
The Open Championship	T12			
PGA Championship				T59

Tournament	2019
Masters Tournament	
PGA Championship	
U.S. Open	CUT
The Open Championship	

Did not play

CUT = missed the half-way cut
"T" = tied

== Results in The Players Championship ==
Tournament	2018	2019
The Players Championship	T75	T16

"T" indicates a tie for a place

== U.S. national team appearances ==
Amateur

- Junior Ryder Cup: 2010 (winners)
- Palmer Cup: 2014, 2015 (winners)

== See also ==
- 2016 Web.com Tour Finals graduates
