= Ryan Brehm =

American professional golfer (born 1986)

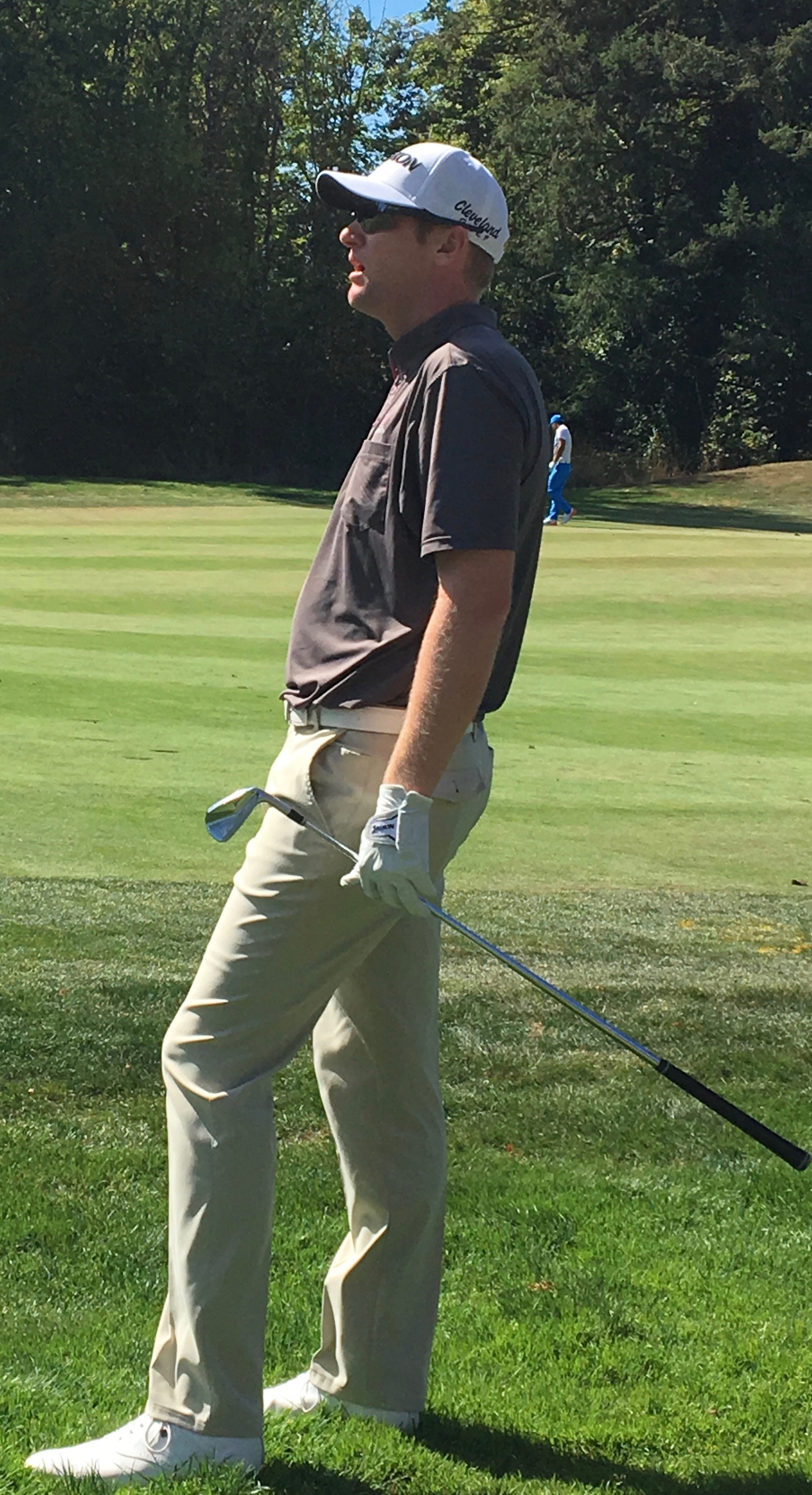

Personal information
- Nationality: United States
- Born: April 5, 1986 (age 40) Mount Pleasant, Michigan, U.S.
- Height: 6 ft 4 in (1.93 m)
- Weight: 220 lb (100 kg; 16 st)

Career
- Sport: Golf
- College: Michigan State University
- Turned professional: 2008
- Current tour: PGA Tour
- Former tours: Korn Ferry Tour; PGA Tour Canada
- Professional wins: 6

Number of wins by tour
- PGA Tour: 1
- Korn Ferry Tour: 2
- Other: 3

Best results in major championships
- Masters Tournament: DNP
- PGA Championship: CUT: 2022
- U.S. Open: T53: 2017
- The Open Championship: DNP

Ryan Brehm (born April 5, 1986) is an American professional golfer.

== Amateur career ==
Brehm played college golf at Michigan State University where he won five times and helped lead MSU to three Big Ten Championships. He later also served as an assistant coach for the team.

== Professional career ==
Brehm played on PGA Tour Canada in 2014 and 2015. His best finish was tied for second at the 2015 Great Waterway Classic. He played on the Web.com Tour in 2016, winning the final regular season event, the WinCo Foods Portland Open. This win moved him to fourth on the money list and secured him a PGA Tour card for 2017.

Brehm earned his first PGA Tour win at the 2022 Puerto Rico Open. Prior to his win, Brehm had never finished in the top 10 of a PGA Tour event, was ranked 773rd in the world, and on the only start of a medical extension.

== Professional wins (6) ==
=== PGA Tour wins (1) ===
No.	Date	Tournament	Winning score	Margin of victory	Runner-up
1	Mar 6, 2022	Puerto Rico Open	−20 (66-67-68-67=268)	6 strokes	(United States) Max McGreevy

=== Korn Ferry Tour wins (2) ===
No.	Date	Tournament	Winning score	Margin of victory	Runner-up
1	Aug 28, 2016	WinCo Foods Portland Open	−15 (63-70-68-68=269)	1 stroke	(United States) Mark Anderson
2	Jul 7, 2019	LECOM Health Challenge	−20 (70-66-64-68=268)	Playoff	(New Zealand) Tim Wilkinson

Korn Ferry Tour playoff record (1–0)

No.	Year	Tournament	Opponent	Result
1	2019	LECOM Health Challenge	(New Zealand) Tim Wilkinson	Won with birdie on first extra hole

=== Other wins (3) ===
- 2009 Michigan Open
- 2010 Michigan Open
- 2014 Michigan Open

== Results in major championships ==
Tournament	2017	2018
U.S. Open	T53	
PGA Championship		

Tournament	2019	2020	2021	2022
PGA Championship				CUT
U.S. Open				

"T" = Tied
CUT = missed the halfway cut
Note: Brehm only played in the PGA Championship and the U.S. Open.

== Results in The Players Championship ==
Tournament	2022	2023
The Players Championship	CUT	CUT

CUT = missed the halfway cut

== See also ==
- 2016 Web.com Tour Finals graduates
- 2019 Korn Ferry Tour Finals graduates
