= Kim Meen-whee =

South Korean golfer

Personal information
- Nationality: South Korea
- Born: 22 February 1992 (age 34)

Career
- Sport: Golf
- Turned professional: 2010
- Current tours: Asian Tour; Korn Ferry Tour
- Former tours: PGA Tour; Korean Tour; OneAsia Tour
- Professional wins: 2
- Highest ranking: 98 (29 July 2018)

Best results in major championships
- Masters Tournament: DNP
- PGA Championship: CUT: 2018
- U.S. Open: T50: 2017
- The Open Championship: DNP

Achievements and awards
- Korean Tour Rookie of the Year: 2012
Medal record
Asian Games
| Gold medal – first place | 2010 Guangzhou | Men's individual |
| Gold medal – first place | 2010 Guangzhou | Men's team |

Kim Meen-whee (Korean: 김민휘; born 22 February 1992), also known as Whee Kim, is a South Korean professional golfer.

== Amateur career ==
As an amateur, Kim won the gold medal at the 2010 Asian Games, both individual and team. He turned professional shortly afterwards. As a gold medalist in the Asian Games, Kim became exempt from military service.

== Professional career ==
After turning professional, Kim played on the Korean Tour and the OneAsia Tour. He finished eighth on the OneAsia Tour's Order of Merit in 2011. He won the 2012 Shinhan Donghae Open on the Korean Tour.

Kim led the second and third rounds of the 2012 PGA Tour Qualifying Tournament, but finished outside the top 25 with a 43rd-place finish, giving him Web.com Tour status. Kim played on the Web.com Tour in 2013 and 2014. His best finish was a tie for second place in the 2013 Mexico Championship.

Kim has played mostly on the PGA Tour since 2015. He was twice a runner-up in 2017, in the FedEx St. Jude Classic and then losing in a playoff in the Shriners Hospitals for Children Open, an early season event on the 2018 PGA Tour. He was also runner-up in the 2015 Korea Open and in 2018 he had his second Korean Tour win in the Descente Korea Munsingwear Matchplay.

== Amateur wins ==
- 2010 Asian Games

== Professional wins (2) ==
=== Korean Tour wins (2) ===
| No. | Date | Tournament | Winning score | Margin of victory | Runner-up |
|---|---|---|---|---|---|
| 1 | 14 Oct 2012 | Shinhan Donghae Open | −4 (73-71-68-72=284) | Playoff | (United States) Kevin Na |
| 2 | 10 Jun 2018 | Descente Korea Munsingwear Matchplay | 1 up | | (South Korea) Hyun Jeong-hyeob |

Korean Tour playoff record (1–0)

| No. | Year | Tournament | Opponent | Result |
|---|---|---|---|---|
| 1 | 2012 | Shinhan Donghae Open | (United States) Kevin Na | Won with par on first extra hole |

== Playoff record ==
PGA Tour playoff record (0–1)

| No. | Year | Tournament | Opponents | Result |
|---|---|---|---|---|
| 1 | 2017 | Shriners Hospitals for Children Open | (United States) Patrick Cantlay, (Germany) Alex Čejka | Cantlay won with par on second extra hole |

== Results in major championships ==
| Tournament | 2017 | 2018 |
|---|---|---|
| Masters Tournament | | |
| U.S. Open | T50 | |
| The Open Championship | | |
| PGA Championship | | CUT |

Did not play

CUT = missed the half-way cut
"T" = tied

== Team appearances ==
Amateur

- Eisenhower Trophy (representing South Korea): 2010

== See also ==
- 2014 Web.com Tour Finals graduates
- 2016 Web.com Tour Finals graduates
