= Servientrega Championship =

Golf tournament

Tournament information
- Location: Cartagena, Colombia
- Established: 2015
- Course: TPC Cartagena
- Par: 72
- Length: 7,135 yards (6,524 m)
- Tour: Web.com Tour
- Format: Stroke play
- Prize fund: US$700,000
- Month played: March
- Final year: 2016

Tournament record score
- Aggregate: 277 Andrew Landry (2015); 277 Brad Fritsch (2016); 277 Ollie Schniederjans (2016)
- To par: −11 as above

Final champion
- (Canada) Brad Fritsch
- Location in Colombia

The Servientrega Championship was a golf tournament on the Web.com Tour. It was first played in March 2015 at the TPC Cartagena in Cartagena, Colombia.

== Winners ==
| Year | Winner | Score | To par | Margin of victory | Runner(s)-up |
Servientrega Championship
| 2016 | (Canada) Brad Fritsch | 277 | −11 | Playoff | (United States) Ollie Schniederjans |
Cartagena de Indias at Karibana Championship
| 2015 | (United States) Andrew Landry | 277 | −11 | 5 strokes | (Australia) Stephen Allan (Argentina) Miguel Ángel Carballo |
