= Rick Lamb =

American professional golfer

Personal information
- Full name: Richard James Lamb
- Nationality: United States
- Born: September 20, 1990 (age 36) South Bend, Indiana, U.S.
- Height: 6 ft 1 in (1.85 m)
- Weight: 190 lb (86 kg; 14 st)

Career
- Sport: Golf
- College: Santa Clara University; University of Tennessee
- Turned professional: 2014
- Current tour: Korn Ferry Tour
- Former tour: PGA Tour
- Professional wins: 1

Number of wins by tour
- Korn Ferry Tour: 1

Best results in major championships
- Masters Tournament: DNP
- PGA Championship: DNP
- U.S. Open: T46: 2021
- The Open Championship: DNP

Richard James Lamb (born September 20, 1990) is an American professional golfer.

Lamb was born and raised in South Bend, Indiana. He played college golf at the University of Tennessee after transferring from Santa Clara University. At Tennessee, he won three events. In his final collegiate event, Lamb finished T-2 at the 2013 NCAA Division I Championship.

Lamb earned limited status on the 2016 Web.com Tour after a tie for 79th at qualifying school in December 2015, but had to rely on sponsor exemptions and Monday qualifying to get into tournaments. In July 2016, he won the LECOM Health Challenge, becoming the first Monday qualifier to win on the Web.com Tour since Sebastian Cappelen at the 2014 Air Capital Classic.

== Personal life ==
Lamb grew up playing both golf and hockey at a high level, later choosing to attend IMG Academies in Bradenton, Florida to pursue golf. Lamb's identical twin brother Scott currently plays on PGA Tour Latinoamérica.

== Amateur wins ==
- 2012 Yale Spring Opener, Gifford Collegiate-CordeValle
- 2013 SeaBest Invitational

== Professional wins (1) ==
=== Korn Ferry Tour wins (1) ===
No.	Date	Tournament	Winning score	Margin of victory	Runners-up
1	Jul 10, 2016	LECOM Health Challenge	−19 (69-69-68-63=269)	Playoff	(United States) Dominic Bozzelli, (Australia) Rhein Gibson, (Taiwan) Pan Cheng-tsung

Korn Ferry Tour playoff record (1–1)

No.	Year	Tournament	Opponent(s)	Result
1	2016	LECOM Health Challenge	(United States) Dominic Bozzelli, (Australia) Rhein Gibson, (Taiwan) Pan Cheng-tsung	Won with birdie on second extra hole
2	2025	Club Car Championship	(France) Jérémy Gandon	Lost to birdie on first extra hole

== Results in major championships ==
Tournament	2021
Masters Tournament	
PGA Championship	
U.S. Open	T46
The Open Championship	

Did not play

"T" = tied

== See also ==
- 2016 Web.com Tour Finals graduates
