= Orange County National Golf Center =

Public Golf course and Lodge located in Winter Garden, Florida

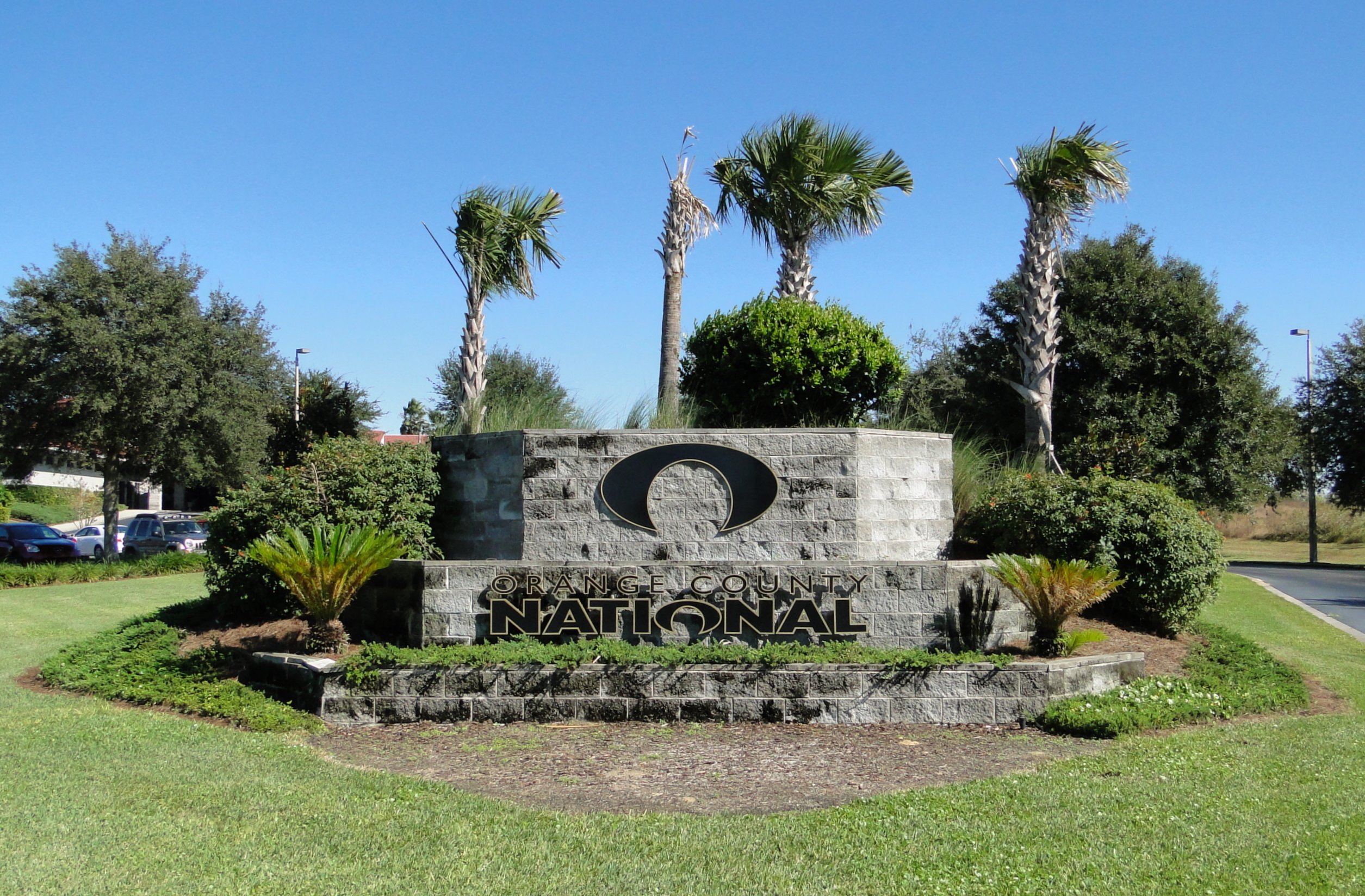

- Location within the United States Location within Florida
- 28.443653°N 81.628118°W

Club information
- Location: Winter Garden, Florida, U.S.
- Elevation: 60 feet (18 m)
- Established: 1997, 29 years ago
- Type: Public
- Tota holes: 36
- Tournaments: PGA Tour Qualifying Tournament Finals (2003, 2005, 2007 and 2010) Orange County National Championship (Korn Ferry Tour 2020) LIV Golf Orlando (LIV Golf League 2023)
- Website: www.ocngolf.com
- Designed by: Phil Ritson, Isao Aoki, and David Harman
- Par: 71
- Length: 7,493 yards (6,852 m) (Crooked Cat Course); 7,350 yards (6,720 m) (Panther Lake Course)
- Slope rating: 139

The Orange County National Golf Center is a public golf club and hotel located in Winter Garden, Florida, United States. The golf course is located 17 miles southwest of Orlando and 5 miles northwest of Walt Disney World.

The first 18 holes for the Panther Course at Orange County National Golf Center opened in 1997. The Crooked Cat course opened in 1999. The third course is a nine-hole layout. The Golf Center also includes a driving range, The Golf Academy, and a lodge.
