= 2012 Korean Tour =

Golf tour season

2012 Korean Tour season
- Duration: 26 April 2012 – 28 October 2012
- Number of official events: 13
- Most wins: (South Korea) Kim Bi-o (2) (South Korea) Kim Dae-sub (2)
- Order of Merit: (South Korea) Lee Sang-hee
- Player of the Year: (South Korea) Lee Sang-hee
- Rookie of the Year: (South Korea) Kim Meen-whee

The 2012 Korean Tour was the 35th season on the Korean Tour, the main professional golf tour in South Korea since it was formed in 1978.

== Schedule ==
The following table lists official events during the 2012 season.

Date	Tournament	Location	Purse (₩)	Winner (Note: The number in brackets after each winner's name is the number of Korean Tour events they had won up to and including that tournament. This information is only shown for Korean Tour members.)	OWGR points	Other tours (Note: ASA − Asian Tour; EUR − European Tour; ONE − OneAsia Tour.)	Notes
29 Apr	Ballantine's Championship	Gyeonggi	€2,205,000	(Austria) Bernd Wiesberger (n/a)	32	ASA, EUR	
13 May	GS Caltex Maekyung Open	Gyeonggi	1,000,000,000	(South Korea) Kim Bi-o (2)	10	ONE	
20 May	SK Telecom Open	Jeju	900,000,000	(South Korea) Kim Bi-o (3)	10	ONE	
3 Jun	Meritz Solmoro Open	Gyeonggi	500,000,000	(South Korea) Choi Jin-ho (3)	6		
24 Jun	Volvik Hildesheim Open	North Chungcheong	US$300,000	(South Korea) Lee In-woo (2)	14	ASA	New tournament
2 Sep	SBS Tour Happiness KJB KPGA Championship	South Jeolla	500,000,000	(South Korea) Lee Sang-hee (2)	6		
9 Sep	Charity High 1 Open	Gangwon	1,000,000,000	(Australia) Matthew Griffin (1)	6	ONE	
16 Sep	Dongbu Insurance Promy Open	Gangwon	400,000,000	(South Korea) Kim Dae-sub (9)	6		
23 Sep	Munsingwear Matchplay Championship	Gangwon	600,000,000	(South Korea) Kim Dae-hyun (3)	6		
7 Oct	CJ Invitational	Gyeonggi	US$750,000	(South Korea) K. J. Choi (16)	14	ASA	
14 Oct	Shinhan Donghae Open	Gyeonggi	1,000,000,000	(South Korea) Kim Meen-whee (1)	12		
21 Oct	Kolon Korea Open	South Chungcheong	1,000,000,000	(South Korea) Kim Dae-sub (10)	12	ONE	
28 Oct	Windsor Classic	Gyeonggi	400,000,000	(South Korea) Baek Joo-yeob (1)	6		New tournament

== Order of Merit ==
The Order of Merit was titled as the Ballantine's Points and was based on tournament results during the season, calculated using a points-based system.

Position	Player	Points
1	(South Korea) Lee Sang-hee	2,995
2	(South Korea) Kang Kyung-nam	2,720
3	(South Korea) Kim Dae-sub	2,620
4	(South Korea) Kim Bi-o	2,300
5	(South Korea) Kim Dae-hyun	2,180

== Awards ==
Award	Winner	Ref.
Player of the Year (Grand Prize Award)	(South Korea) Lee Sang-hee	
Rookie of the Year (Myeong-chul Award)	(South Korea) Kim Meen-whee	
