= Orange County National Championship =

Golf tournament

Tournament information
- Location: Winter Garden, Florida
- Established: 2020
- Courses: Orange County National Golf Center (Panther Lake Course)
- Par: 71
- Length: 7,309 yards (6,683 m)
- Tour: Korn Ferry Tour
- Format: Stroke play
- Prize fund: US$600,000
- Month played: October
- Final year: 2020

Tournament record score
- Aggregate: 261 Trey Mullinax (2020)
- To par: −23 as above

Final champion
- (United States) Trey Mullinax

Location map
- Location in the United States Location in Florida

The Orange County National Championship was a golf tournament on the Korn Ferry Tour. The tournament was one of several added to the Korn Ferry Tour schedule in 2020 as part of adjustments due to the COVID-19 pandemic. It was played in October 2020 on the Panther Lake Course at Orange County National Golf Center near Winter Garden, Florida. Trey Mullinax won the tournament by one stroke over Stephan Jäger and Brandon Wu.

== Winners ==
Year	Winner	Score	To par	Margin of victory	Runners-up
2020	(United States) Trey Mullinax	261	−23	1 stroke	(Germany) Stephan Jäger (United States) Brandon Wu
