= Golf at the 2010 Asian Games – Men's individual =

Men's individual at the 2010 Asian Games
- Venue: Dragon Lake Golf Club
- Date: 17 November 2010 – 20 November 2010
- Competitors: 77 from 20 nations

Medalists
gold medal	Kim Meen-whee	South Korea
silver medal	Miguel Tabuena	Philippines
bronze medal	Hung Chien-yao	Chinese Taipei

The men's individual competition at the 2010 Asian Games in Guangzhou was held from 17 November to 20 November at the Dragon Lake Golf Club.

== Schedule ==
All times are China Standard Time (UTC+08:00)

Date	Time	Event
Wednesday, 17 November 2010	07:00	First round
Thursday, 18 November 2010	07:00	Second round
Friday, 19 November 2010	07:00	Third round
Saturday, 20 November 2010	07:00	Fourth round

== Results ==
Legend

- DNS — Did not start
- DSQ — Disqualified

Rank	Athlete	Round				Total	To par
Rank	Athlete	1	2	3	4	Total	To par
1st place, gold medalist(s)	Kim Meen-whee (KOR)	69	68	67	69	273	−15
2nd place, silver medalist(s)	Miguel Tabuena (PHI)	68	68	74	72	282	−6
3rd place, bronze medalist(s)	Hung Chien-yao (TPE)	71	70	73	69	283	−5
4	Atthachai Jaichalad (THA)	73	73	65	74	285	−3
4	Rashid Khan (IND)	71	68	74	72	285	−3
4	Lee Kyoung-hoon (KOR)	75	70	69	71	285	−3
7	Satoshi Kodaira (JPN)	74	68	73	73	288	0
8	Wasin Sripattranusorn (THA)	75	69	72	73	289	+1
9	Lee Jae-hyeok (KOR)	69	70	74	78	291	+3
9	Abhinav Lohan (IND)	75	70	74	72	291	+3
11	Huang Tao (TPE)	77	74	72	69	292	+4
12	Park Il-hwan (KOR)	72	72	70	79	293	+5
12	Mohd Arie Irawan (MAS)	82	74	73	64	293	+5
14	Mithun Perera (SRI)	69	74	78	73	294	+6
14	Hideki Matsuyama (JPN)	75	77	70	72	294	+6
14	Zhang Xinjun (CHN)	74	70	71	79	294	+6
17	Hak Shun Yat (HKG)	74	67	75	81	297	+9
17	Choo Tze Huang (SIN)	76	72	76	73	297	+9
19	Mhark Fernando (PHI)	77	75	73	73	298	+10
19	Kenta Konishi (JPN)	75	72	75	76	298	+10
21	Huang Wenyi (CHN)	76	74	75	74	299	+11
21	Shakhawat Hossain Sohel (BAN)	75	73	77	74	299	+11
21	Chan Tuck Soon (MAS)	76	75	73	75	299	+11
24	Gregory Raymund Foo (SIN)	76	76	75	73	300	+12
24	Wei Wei (CHN)	80	74	72	74	300	+12
24	Khalid Al-Attieh (KSA)	72	79	75	74	300	+12
27	Liu Yuxiang (CHN)	77	75	71	78	301	+13
27	Poom Saksansin (THA)	78	73	75	75	301	+13
29	Md Sayum Miah (BAN)	74	74	76	78	302	+14
29	Masahiro Kawamura (JPN)	75	78	75	74	302	+14
31	Hsieh Chi-hsien (TPE)	76	76	75	76	303	+15
32	Johnson Poh (SIN)	78	70	81	75	304	+16
32	Joshua Shou (SIN)	77	76	73	78	304	+16
32	Chan Chun Hung (HKG)	75	80	78	71	304	+16
32	Konstantin Liu (HKG)	84	73	76	71	304	+16
36	Marcel Puyat (PHI)	80	75	71	79	305	+17
37	Jerson Balasabas (PHI)	73	74	79	80	306	+18
38	Ali Hammoud (LIB)	80	76	75	78	309	+21
39	Rahul Bajaj (IND)	81	79	78	72	310	+22
39	Md Dulal Hossain (BAN)	82	79	76	73	310	+22
39	Yang Fei-hao (TPE)	81	74	80	75	310	+22
42	Tissa Chandradasa (SRI)	80	75	78	78	311	+23
42	Md Jakiruzzaman Jakir (BAN)	75	75	82	79	311	+23
44	Vijitha Bandara (SRI)	78	79	76	80	313	+25
45	Nadaraja Thangarajah (SRI)	76	85	78	75	314	+26
46	Kenneth de Silva (MAS)	79	84	78	75	316	+28
47	Mohd Iylia Jamil (MAS)	86	79	78	76	319	+31
48	Mazen Hamdan (LIB)	77	78	81	84	320	+32
49	Phạm Minh Đức (VIE)	85	80	79	77	321	+33
50	Steven Lam (HKG)	77	80	84	83	324	+36
50	Ali Al-Bishi (QAT)	87	78	78	81	324	+36
52	Tashi Tsering (NEP)	89	77	79	84	329	+41
53	Jeham Al-Kuwari (QAT)	87	76	88	79	330	+42
53	Trịnh Văn Thọ (VIE)	81	85	86	78	330	+42
55	Yan Sihuang (MAC)	79	82	85	87	333	+45
56	Mehdi Ramadan (LIB)	84	83	86	85	338	+50
57	Tang Chak Hou (MAC)	87	86	82	85	340	+52
58	Rachid Akl (LIB)	90	87	85	80	342	+54
59	Tashi Ghale (NEP)	86	89	83	87	345	+57
60	Othman Al-Mulla (KSA)	92	90	83	83	348	+60
61	Saleh Al-Kaabi (QAT)	91	84	93	81	349	+61
62	Ao Ka Wai (MAC)	91	91	87	84	353	+65
63	Chan Sio Peng (MAC)	91	87	88	89	355	+67
64	Delgermaagiin Ölziidelger (MGL)	97	82	90	93	362	+74
64	Neeraj Shamsher Rana (NEP)	95	88	92	87	362	+74
64	Đỗ Lê Gia Đạt (VIE)	96	89	85	92	362	+74
67	Gangaagiin Mendsaikhan (MGL)	94	87	94	88	363	+75
68	Abdulaziz Al-Bishi (QAT)	95	88	91	90	364	+76
69	Fahad Al-Mansour (KSA)	91	93	94	87	365	+77
70	Boldbaataryn Mönkhbaatar (MGL)	95	90	91	90	366	+78
71	Nouh Reza (KSA)	105	97	96	94	392	+104
72	Yanjivyn Bayarkhüü (MGL)	108	97	99	97	401	+113
73	Hashmatullah Sarwaree (AFG)	108	98	101	97	404	+116
74	Nguyễn Trí Dũng (VIE)	107	109	110	96	422	+134
75	Ali Ahmad Fazel (AFG)	130	112	113	112	467	+179
—	Abhijit Singh Chadha (IND)	DSQ				DSQ	
—	Nima Gelu Goparma (NEP)					DNS	
