= Brad Fritsch =

Canadian professional golfer

Personal information
- Nationality: Canada
- Born: November 9, 1977 (age 48) Edmonton, Alberta, Canada
- Height: 5 ft 11 in (1.80 m)
- Weight: 235 lb (107 kg; 16.8 st)

Career
- Sport: Golf
- College: Campbell University
- Turned professional: 2000
- Current tour: Web.com Tour
- Former tours: PGA Tour; Canadian Tour
- Professional wins: 2

Number of wins by tour
- Korn Ferry Tour: 1
- Other: 1

Best results in major championships
- Masters Tournament: DNP
- PGA Championship: DNP
- U.S. Open: T46: 2015
- The Open Championship: DNP

Brad Fritsch (born November 9, 1977) is a Canadian professional golfer.

== Career ==
Fritsch was born in Edmonton, Alberta and grew up in Ottawa, Ontario.

Fritsch played on the Canadian Tour from 2001 to 2006 and again from 2010 to 2011. His best finish was second at the 2004 Bay Mills Open Players Championship. He played on the Web.com Tour from 2007 to 2009, 2012 and 2015. He won the Web.com Tour Qualifying Tournament in 2014. His best finish was T-2 at the 2012 Mylan Classic.

Fritsch gained his PGA Tour card for 2013 by finishing in the top 25 of the Web.com Tour money list in 2012. He improved his position by finishing T-7 at the 2012 PGA Tour Qualifying School. He made 18 cuts in 24 events in 2013, finishing 142nd on the money list and missing the FedEx Cup playoffs by four places (ranked 129th). He played in the Web.com Tour Finals and finished 14th to regain his PGA Tour card for 2014. He won his first Web.com Tour tournament, the Servientrega Championship, in 2016.

In 2013, Fritsch represented Canada in the World Cup together with David Hearn and the two-man team finished 5th.

Fritsch was suspended by the PGA Tour for three months in 2018 for violation of its anti-doping policy after he self-reported taking a banned substance. Taking to Facebook, Fritsch said he was 'embarrassed' at not paying attention to the supplements that was in the spray which he was taking as part of a weight loss program.

== Professional wins (2) ==
=== Web.com Tour wins (1) ===
| No. | Date | Tournament | Winning score | Margin of victory | Runner-up |
|---|---|---|---|---|---|
| 1 | Apr 10, 2016 | Servientrega Championship | −11 (71-65-70-71=277) | Playoff | (United States) Ollie Schniederjans |

Web.com Tour playoff record (1–0)

| No. | Year | Tournament | Opponent | Result |
|---|---|---|---|---|
| 1 | 2016 | Servientrega Championship | (United States) Ollie Schniederjans | Won with par on first extra hole |

=== Other wins (1) ===
- 2006 Azores Open

== Team appearances ==
Professional

- World Cup (representing Canada): 2013

== See also ==
- 2012 Web.com Tour graduates
- 2012 PGA Tour Qualifying School graduates
- 2013 Web.com Tour Finals graduates
- 2016 Web.com Tour Finals graduates
