= Trey Mullinax =

American professional golfer (born 1992)

Personal information
- Full name: Howard Travis Mullinax III
- Nationality: United States
- Born: June 29, 1992 (age 34) Birmingham, Alabama, U.S.
- Height: 6 ft 4 in (1.93 m)
- Weight: 195 lb (88 kg; 13.9 st)
- Spouse: Abigail Mullinax

Career
- Sport: Golf
- College: University of Alabama
- Turned professional: 2014
- Current tour: PGA Tour
- Former tour: Korn Ferry Tour
- Professional wins: 3
- Highest ranking: 77 (March 5, 2023) (as of October 25, 2026)

Number of wins by tour
- PGA Tour: 1
- European Tour: 1
- Korn Ferry Tour: 2

Best results in major championships
- Masters Tournament: DNP
- PGA Championship: CUT: 2023
- U.S. Open: T9: 2017
- The Open Championship: T21: 2022

Howard Travis "Trey" Mullinax III (born June 29, 1992) is an American professional golfer.

Mullinax was born in Birmingham, Alabama. He attended and played golf at Gardendale High School. He played college golf at the University of Alabama where he won two tournaments, was an All-American, and helped the team to the 2013 and 2014 NCAA Championships.

Mullinax turned professional in 2014 and has played on the Web.com Tour since 2015. He won his first Web.com Tour event at the 2016 Rex Hospital Open.

In March 2018, Mullinax came through a Monday qualifier for the Valspar Championship. He then tied for 8th, while playing one shot from inside a hospitality tent when he declined a free drop.

In April 2018, Mullinax fired a course record 62 during the third round of the Valero Texas Open at TPC San Antonio, to position himself one shot back going into the final round. He finished as joint runner-up, after a final round 69, to record his best PGA Tour finish to date.

In May 2019, at the Charles Schwab Challenge's pro-am round, Mullinax got a concussion from a golf ball. Although he initially recovered and made the cut for the tournament, he struggled and missed every other cut in 2019, and got diagnosed with convergence insufficiency as complications from him playing through the injury. He got relegated to the Korn Ferry Tour in 2020. Mullinax played well in the 2020–21 Korn Ferry Tour season, including a win at the Orange County National Championship, which got him back to the PGA Tour in 2022.

He won his first PGA Tour event at the 2022 Barbasol Championship.

In July 2026, Mullinax was suspended for 6 months by the PGA Tour for testing positive for a performance-enhancing substance.

== Amateur wins ==
- 2012 Northern Amateur
- 2013 Savannah Quarters Individual Intercollegiate, Isleworth Collegiate Invitational

== Professional wins (3) ==
=== PGA Tour wins (1) ===
No.	Date	Tournament	Winning score	Margin of victory	Runner-up
1	Jul 10, 2022	Barbasol Championship^{1}	−25 (65-65-67-66=263)	1 stroke	(United States) Kevin Streelman

^{1}Co-sanctioned by the European Tour

=== Korn Ferry Tour wins (2) ===
No.	Date	Tournament	Winning score	Margin of victory	Runner(s)-up
1	Mar 15, 2016	Rex Hospital Open	−14 (68-67-67-68=274)	1 stroke	(United States) Brady Schnell
2	Oct 11, 2020	Orange County National Championship	−23 (65-65-62-69=261)	1 stroke	(Germany) Stephan Jäger, (United States) Brandon Wu

== Results in major championships ==
Results not in chronological order in 2020.

Tournament	2017	2018
Masters Tournament		
U.S. Open	T9	CUT
The Open Championship		
PGA Championship		

Tournament	2019	2020	2021	2022	2023
Masters Tournament					
PGA Championship					CUT
U.S. Open					
The Open Championship		NT		T21	CUT

Top 10
Did not play

CUT = missed the half-way cut
"T" indicates a tie for a place
NT = No tournament due to the COVID-19 pandemic

== Results in The Players Championship ==
Tournament	2023	2024	2025
The Players Championship	CUT		T61

Did not play

CUT = missed the halfway cut
"T" indicates a tie for a place

== U.S. national team appearances ==
Amateur

- Palmer Cup: 2014

== See also ==
- 2016 Web.com Tour Finals graduates
- 2021 Korn Ferry Tour Finals graduates
