= LECOM Health Challenge =

Tournament information
- Location: Findley Lake, New York
- Established: 2016
- Courses: Peek'n Peak Resort (Upper Course)
- Par: 72
- Length: 7,058 yards (6,454 m)
- Tour: Korn Ferry Tour
- Format: Stroke play
- Prize fund: US$600,000
- Month played: July
- Final year: 2019

Tournament record score
- Aggregate: 265 Chesson Hadley (2017)
- To par: −23 as above

Final champion
- (United States) Ryan Brehm
- Location in the United States Location in New York

The LECOM Health Challenge was a golf tournament on the Korn Ferry Tour. It was first played in July 2016 on the Upper Course of Peek'n Peak Resort in Findley Lake, New York, which had previously hosted the Peek'n Peak Classic on the same tour from 2002 to 2007.

== Winners ==
| Year | Winner | Score | To par | Margin of victory | Runner(s)-up |
|---|---|---|---|---|---|
| 2019 | (United States) Ryan Brehm | 268 | −20 | Playoff | (New Zealand) Tim Wilkinson |
| 2018 | (Argentina) Nelson Ledesma | 266 | −22 | 2 strokes | (United States) Kyle Jones (Colombia) Sebastián Muñoz |
| 2017 | (United States) Chesson Hadley | 265 | −23 | 1 stroke | (United States) Beau Hossler |
| 2016 | (United States) Rick Lamb | 269 | −19 | Playoff | (United States) Dominic Bozzelli (Australia) Rhein Gibson (Taiwan) Pan Cheng-tsung |
