= 2016 Web.com Tour =

Golf tour season

2016 Web.com Tour season
- Duration: January 28, 2016 – September 25, 2016
- Number of official events: 24 (Note: One further tournament was scheduled but was canceled.)
- Most wins: (United States) Wesley Bryan (3)
- Regular season money list: (United States) Wesley Bryan
- Finals money list: (United States) Grayson Murray
- Player of the Year: (United States) Wesley Bryan

The 2016 Web.com Tour was the 27th season of the Web.com Tour, the official development tour to the PGA Tour.

== Schedule ==
The following table lists official events during the 2016 season.

Date	Tournament	Location	Purse (US$)	Winner (Note: The number in parentheses after each winner's name is the number of Web.com Tour events they had won up to and including that tournament. This information is only shown for Web.com Tour members. It is rare for someone to accumulate many wins on the Web.com Tour as success at this level usually leads to promotion to the PGA Tour.)	OWGR points	Notes
Jan 31	Panama Claro Championship	Panama	625,000	(United States) Ryan Armour (1)	14	
Feb 7	Club Colombia Championship	Colombia	700,000	(Colombia) Sebastián Muñoz (1)	14	
Mar 20	Chitimacha Louisiana Open	Louisiana	550,000	(United States) Wesley Bryan (1)	14	
Apr 3	Brasil Champions	Brazil	700,000	(United States) Andrew Svoboda (3)	14	
Apr 10	Servientrega Championship	Colombia	700,000	(Canada) Brad Fritsch (1)	14	
Apr 24	El Bosque Mexico Championship	Mexico	650,000	(United States) Wesley Bryan (2)	14	
May 1	United Leasing & Finance Championship	Indiana	600,000	(Republic of Ireland) Séamus Power (1)	14	
May 15	Rex Hospital Open	North Carolina	650,000	(United States) Trey Mullinax (1)	14	
May 22	BMW Charity Pro-Am	South Carolina	675,000	(United States) Richy Werenski (1)	14	Pro-Am
Jun 5	Corales Puntacana Resort and Club Championship	Dominican Republic	625,000	(United States) Dominic Bozzelli (1)	14	New tournament
Jun 12	Rust-Oleum Championship	Illinois	600,000	(United States) Max Homa (2)	14	
Jun 19	Nashville Golf Open	Tennessee	550,000	(United States) James Driscoll (2)	14	New tournament
Jun 26	Air Capital Classic	Kansas	625,000	(United States) Ollie Schniederjans (1)	14	
Jul 10	LECOM Health Challenge	New York	600,000	(United States) Rick Lamb (1)	14	New tournament
Jul 17	Lincoln Land Charity Championship	Illinois	550,000	(United States) Martin Flores (1)	14	New tournament
Jul 24	Utah Championship	Utah	650,000	(United States) Nicholas Lindheim (1)	14	
Jul 31	Ellie Mae Classic	California	600,000	(Germany) Stephan Jäger (1)	14	
Aug 7	Digital Ally Open	Kansas	650,000	(United States) Wesley Bryan (3) (Note: Bryan earned immediate promotion to the PGA Tour, as this was his third win of the season.)	14	
Aug 14	Price Cutter Charity Championship	Missouri	675,000	(Canada) Mackenzie Hughes (1)	14	
Aug 21	News Sentinel Open	Tennessee	550,000	(United States) J. J. Spaun (1)	14	
Aug 28	WinCo Foods Portland Open	Oregon	800,000	(United States) Ryan Brehm (1)	14	
Sep 11	DAP Championship	Ohio	1,000,000	(United States) Bryson DeChambeau (1)	16	New tournament Finals event
Sep 18	Albertsons Boise Open	Idaho	1,000,000	(United States) Michael Thompson (1)	16	Finals event
Sep 25	Nationwide Children's Hospital Championship	Ohio	1,000,000	(United States) Grayson Murray (1)	16	Finals event
~~Oct 9~~	Web.com Tour Championship	Florida	–	Canceled (Note: Canceled due to Hurricane Matthew.)	–	Finals event

== Location of tournaments ==
Location of tournaments of the 2016 Web.com Tour in the United States.
Regular-season events
Regular-season finale
Finals events
Location of tournaments of the 2016 Web.com Tour outside the United States.

== Money list ==
=== Regular season money list ===
The regular season money list was based on prize money won during the season, calculated in U.S. dollars. The top 25 players on the regular season money list earned status to play on the 2016–17 PGA Tour.

Position	Player	Prize money ($)
1	(United States) Wesley Bryan	449,392
2	(United States) Richy Werenski	351,770
3	(United States) J. J. Spaun	350,832
4	(United States) Ryan Brehm	281,809
5	(United States) Martin Flores	281,403

=== Finals money list ===
The Finals money list was based on prize money won during the Web.com Tour Finals, calculated in U.S. dollars. The top 25 players on the Finals money list (not otherwise exempt) earned status to play on the 2016–17 PGA Tour.

Position	Player	Prize money ($)
1	(United States) Grayson Murray	248,000
2	(United States) Michael Thompson	184,000
3	(United States) Bryson DeChambeau	180,000
4	(Australia) Cameron Smith	114,910
5	(Argentina) Miguel Ángel Carballo	108,000

== Awards ==
Award	Winner	Ref.
Player of the Year (Jack Nicklaus Trophy)	(United States) Wesley Bryan	
