= KPGA Gunsan CC Open =

Korean golf tournament

Tournament information
- Location: Gunsan, South Korea
- Established: 2011
- Course: Gunsan Country Club
- Par: 71
- Length: 7,124 yards (6,514 m)
- Tour: Korean Tour
- Format: Stroke play
- Prize fund: ₩700,000,000
- Month played: July

Tournament record score
- Aggregate: 265 Lee Hyung-joon (2017)
- To par: −20 Jang Yu-bin (2023) −20 Jeon Ga-lam (2023)

Current champion
- (South Korea) Jung Han-mil

Location map
- Location in South Korea

The KPGA Gunsan CC Open is a professional golf tournament that takes place at Gunsan Country Club near Gunsan in South Korea. Prize money has been ₩500,000,000 since 2015.

In 2009 and 2010 Gunsan Country Club hosted an event sponsored by Dongbu Insurance.

== Winners ==
Year	Winner	Score	To par	Margin of victory	Runner(s)-up
KPGA Gunsan CC Open
2026	(South Korea) Jung Han-mil	271	−17	4 strokes	(South Korea) Kim Seong-hyeon
2025	(South Korea) Ok Tae-hoon	269	−19	2 strokes	(South Korea) Lee Jung-hwan
2024	(South Korea) Jang Yu-bin (2)	272	−16	2 strokes	(South Korea) Jung Han-mil
2023	(South Korea) Jang Yu-bin (a)	268	−20	Playoff	(South Korea) Jeon Ga-lam
Bodyfriend Phantom Rovo Gunsan CC Open
2022	(South Korea) Seo Yo-seop	274	−14	Playoff	(South Korea) Ham Jeong-woo (South Korea) Hwang Inn-choon
KPGA Gunsan CC Open
2021	(South Korea) Kim Dong-eun	278	−6	1 stroke	(South Korea) Park Sung-kug
2020	(South Korea) Tom Kim	268	−16	2 strokes	(South Korea) Kim Min-kyu
NS HomeShopping Gunsan CC Jeonbuk Open
2019	(South Korea) Kim Bi-o	277	−7	2 strokes	(South Korea) Kim Tae-hoon
2018	(Canada) Sukwoan Ko	275	−9	Playoff	(South Korea) Lee Han-gu
2017	(South Korea) Lee Hyung-joon	265	−19	2 strokes	(South Korea) Kang Kyung-nam (South Korea) Park Jun-sub
2016	(South Korea) Joo Heung-chol	276	−12	3 strokes	(South Korea) Han Min-kyu (South Korea) Lee Hyung-joon
Gunsan CC Open
2015	(South Korea) Lee Soo-min	274	−14	2 strokes	(South Korea) Lee Ji-hoon
2014	(South Korea) Joo Heung-chol	275	−13	2 strokes	(South Korea) Hur In-hoi
2013	(South Korea) Lee Soo-min (a)	272	−16	2 strokes	(South Korea) Kang Kyung-nam
2012: No tournament
Volvik Gunsan CC Open
2011	(South Korea) Lee Seong-ho	286	−2	2 strokes	(South Korea) Choi Ho-sung
