= Lee Kyoung-hoon =

South Korean professional golfer

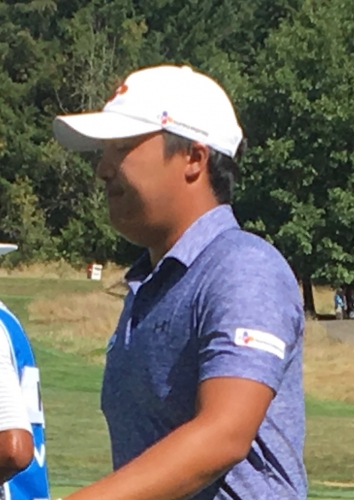

Personal information
- Nationality: South Korea
- Born: 24 August 1991 (age 35) Seoul, South Korea
- Height: 1.78 m (5 ft 10 in)
- Weight: 82 kg (181 lb; 12.9 st)

Career
- Sport: Golf
- Turned professional: 2010
- Current tour: PGA Tour
- Former tours: Japan Golf Tour; OneAsia Tour; Web.com Tour
- Professional wins: 6
- Highest ranking: 33 (23 October 2022) (as of 25 October 2026)

Number of wins by tour
- PGA Tour: 2
- Japan Golf Tour: 2
- Other: 2

Best results in major championships
- Masters Tournament: T23: 2023
- PGA Championship: T29: 2023
- U.S. Open: T37: 2022
- The Open Championship: CUT: 2022, 2023
Medal record
Asian Games
Gold medal – first place	2010 Guangzhou	Men's team

Lee Kyoung-hoon (Korean: 이경훈; Hanja: 李京勲; born 24 August 1991), also known as K. H. Lee, is a South Korean professional golfer who plays on the PGA Tour. He won the 2021 and 2022 AT&T Byron Nelson.

== Professional career ==
Lee turned professional in 2010 and joined the OneAsia Tour for 2011, earning his card through qualifying school. He finished 39th on the Order of Merit with his best finish being a tie for sixth. He joined the Japan Golf Tour in 2012 and recorded a runner-up finish in his second event of the year. He won the Nagashima Shigeo Invitational Sega Sammy Cup in July.

Lee claimed his first victory on the OneAsia Tour in September 2015, with a four stroke victory at the Kolon Korea Open. In October 2015, Lee won for the third time in his career, and second time on the Japan Golf Tour when he secured victory at the Honma TourWorld Cup at Trophia Golf.

Lee moved to the United States in 2016 to play the Web.com Tour, after finishing 8th in the Web.com Tour qualifying tournament. His best result was 4th at the WinCo Foods Portland Open. Two weeks later, he won the Kolon Korean Open, and in October he finished second at the Japan Open Golf Championship and Bridgestone Open. He finished only 78th on the Web.com Tour, and played again in the qualifying tournament, where he tied for 14th place. He returned to the Web.com Tour in 2017 where his best finish was tied for third place in the Rex Hospital Open. In 2018, he finished fifth in the Web.com Tour regular season rankings to earn a promotion to the PGA Tour.

At the 2021 Waste Management Phoenix Open, Lee finished in a tie for second, one stroke behind winner, Brooks Koepka. Three months later, Lee earned his first PGA Tour win at the 2021 AT&T Byron Nelson, with a score of 25-under-par, beating runner-up Sam Burns by three strokes. A year later, Lee successfully defended his title at the AT&T Byron Nelson, shooting 26-under-par; beating Jordan Spieth by one shot.

In September 2022, Lee was selected for the International team in the 2022 Presidents Cup; he won two and lost one of the three matches he played.

== Professional wins (6) ==
=== PGA Tour wins (2) ===
No.	Date	Tournament	Winning score	Margin of victory	Runner-up
1	16 May 2021	AT&T Byron Nelson	−25 (65-65-67-66=263)	3 strokes	(United States) Sam Burns
2	15 May 2022	AT&T Byron Nelson (2)	−26 (64-68-67-63=262)	1 stroke	(United States) Jordan Spieth

=== Japan Golf Tour wins (2) ===
No.	Date	Tournament	Winning score	Margin of victory	Runner(s)-up
1	8 Jul 2012	Nagashima Shigeo Invitational Sega Sammy Cup	−19 (65-69-70-65=269)	2 strokes	(South Korea) Kim Hyung-sung
2	11 Oct 2015	Honma TourWorld Cup	−16 (71-65-65-67=268)	1 stroke	(Japan) Tomohiro Kondo, (Japan) Ryuichi Oda, (Japan) Taichi Teshima, (China) Wu Ashun

=== OneAsia Tour wins (2) ===
No.	Date	Tournament	Winning score	Margin of victory	Runner-up
1	13 Sep 2015	Kolon Korea Open^{1}	−13 (68-69-68-66=271)	4 strokes	(South Korea) Kim Meen-whee
2	11 Sep 2016	Kolon Korea Open^{1} (2)	−16 (65-67-68-68=268)	3 strokes	(South Korea) Choi Jin-ho

^{1}Co-sanctioned by the Korean Tour

=== Korean Tour wins (2) ===
No.	Date	Tournament	Winning score	Margin of victory	Runner-up
1	13 Sep 2015	Kolon Korea Open^{1}	−13 (68-69-68-66=271)	4 strokes	(South Korea) Kim Meen-whee
2	11 Sep 2016	Kolon Korea Open^{1} (2)	−16 (65-67-68-68=268)	3 strokes	(South Korea) Choi Jin-ho

^{1}Co-sanctioned by the OneAsia Tour

== Results in major championships ==
Results not in chronological order in 2020.

Tournament	2014	2015	2016	2017	2018
Masters Tournament					
U.S. Open	CUT				
The Open Championship					
PGA Championship					

Tournament	2019	2020	2021	2022	2023	2024
Masters Tournament				CUT	T23	
PGA Championship			CUT	T41	T29	WD
U.S. Open	CUT		CUT	T37	CUT	
The Open Championship		NT		CUT	CUT	

Did not play

CUT = missed the half-way cut
WD = withdrew
"T" indicates a tie for a place

=== Summary ===
Tournament	Wins	2nd	3rd	Top-5	Top-10	Top-25	Events	Cuts made
Masters Tournament	0	0	0	0	0	1	2	1
PGA Championship	0	0	0	0	0	0	4	2
U.S. Open	0	0	0	0	0	0	5	1
The Open Championship	0	0	0	0	0	0	2	0
Totals	0	0	0	0	0	1	13	4

- Most consecutive cuts made – 2 (twice)
- Longest streak of top-10s – none

== Results in The Players Championship ==
Tournament	2021	2022	2023	2024	2025
The Players Championship	T41	T55	CUT	CUT	CUT

CUT = missed the halfway cut
"T" indicates a tie for a place

== Results in World Golf Championships ==
Tournament	2021	2022	2023
Championship			
Match Play			T59
Invitational	T54		
Champions	NT^{1}	NT^{1}	

^{1}Cancelled due to COVID-19 pandemic

Did not play

"T" = Tied
NT = No tournament
Note that the Championship and Invitational were discontinued from 2022. The Champions was discontinued from 2023.

== Team appearances ==
Professional

- Presidents Cup (representing the International team): 2022

== See also ==
- 2018 Web.com Tour Finals graduates
