= SK Telecom Open =

South Korean golf tournament

Tournament information
- Location: Jeju, South Korea
- Established: 1997
- Course: Pinx Golf Club
- Par: 71
- Length: 7,326 yards (6,699 m)
- Tours: Asian Tour; Korean Tour; OneAsia Tour
- Format: Stroke play
- Prize fund: ₩1,300,000,000
- Month played: May

Tournament record score
- Aggregate: 265 Kim Bi-o (2022)
- To par: −22 Bae Sang-moon (2010)

Current champion
- (South Korea) K. J. Choi

Final champion
- Location in South Korea

The SK Telecom Open is an annual professional golf tournament hosted in South Korea and sponsored by the Korean cell phone company SK Telecom. The tournament was inaugurated in June 1997 as "SK Telecom Classic", and renamed in 2001. It is part of the Korean Tour for men, and was co-sanctioned by the Asian Tour from 2001 to 2007. It was co-sanctioned by the OneAsia Tour from 2010 to 2015. Since 2017 it has had prize money of ₩1,200,000,000.

The tenth edition, held 4–7 May 2006, was shortened to 54 holes because of rain. The tournament that year made international headlines when teenage golfer Michelle Wie made the cut, only the second female golfer to do so in a Korean men's tournament after Se Ri Pak in 2003 and the first to do it in an Asian Tour tournament.

It has been staged at five different venues since its inception: Pinx Golf Club, Sky 72 Golf Club, BA Vista, IIdong Lake and the Lakeside Golf Clubs.

== Winners ==
Year	Tour(s) (Note: ASA − Asian Tour; KOR − Korean Tour; ONE − OneAsia Tour.)	Winner	Score	To par	Margin of victory	Runner(s)-up	Venue
SK Telecom Open
2025	KOR	(South Korea) Eom Jae-woong	202 (Note: Shortened to 54 holes due to weather.)	−11	Playoff	(Canada) Richard T. Lee	Pinx
2024	KOR	(South Korea) K. J. Choi (4)	281	−3	Playoff	(South Korea) Park Sang-hyun	Pinx
2023	KOR	(South Korea) Baek Seuk-hyun	271	−13	1 stroke	(Canada) Richard T. Lee	Pinx
2022	KOR	(South Korea) Kim Bi-o (2)	265	−19	7 strokes	(South Korea) Gang Yun-seok	Pinx
2021	KOR	(South Korea) Tom Kim	270	−14	3 strokes	(South Korea) Kim Baek-jun (a)	Pinx
2020: No tournament due to the COVID-19 pandemic
2019	KOR	(South Korea) Ham Jeong-woo	271	−13	2 strokes	(South Korea) Jung Ji-ho (South Korea) Lee Soo-min	Sky 72
2018	KOR	(South Korea) Kwon Sung-yeol	275	−13	Playoff	(South Korea) Ryu Hyun-woo	Sky 72
2017	KOR	(South Korea) Choi Jin-ho (2)	269	−19	2 strokes	(South Korea) Park Sang-hyun	Sky 72
2016	KOR	(South Korea) Lee Sang-hee	278	−10	1 stroke	(South Korea) Kim Kyung-tae	Sky 72
2015	KOR, ONE	(South Korea) Choi Jin-ho	278	−10	1 stroke	(South Korea) Lee Soo-min	Sky 72
2014	KOR, ONE	(South Korea) Kim Seung-hyuk	277	−11	1 stroke	(South Korea) Kim Kyung-tae (South Korea) Lee Tae-hee	Sky 72
2013	KOR, ONE	(Australia) Matthew Griffin	203	−13	1 stroke	(South Korea) Kang Wook-soon	Pinx
2012	KOR, ONE	(South Korea) Kim Bi-o	270	−18	3 strokes	(South Korea) Park Sang-hyun	Pinx
2011	KOR, ONE	(Australia) Kurt Barnes	202	−14	1 stroke	(South Korea) Kim Kyung-tae	Pinx
2010	KOR, ONE	(South Korea) Bae Sang-moon (2)	266	−22	3 strokes	(South Korea) Kim Dae-hyun	Sky 72
2009	KOR	(South Korea) Park Sang-hyun	276	−12	1 stroke	(South Korea) Kim Do-hoon	Sky 72
2008	KOR	(South Korea) K. J. Choi (3)	272	−16	4 strokes	(South Korea) Kang Kyung-nam	Sky 72
2007	ASA, KOR	(South Korea) Bae Sang-moon	271	−17	6 strokes	(Australia) Aaron Baddeley (South Korea) Kim Hyung-tae	BA Vista
2006	ASA, KOR	(Thailand) Prom Meesawat	201	−15	3 strokes	(South Korea) Lee Seong-ho (India) Jeev Milkha Singh	Sky 72
2005	ASA, KOR	(South Korea) K. J. Choi (2)	275	−13	5 strokes	(Australia) Andrew Buckle (United States) Fred Couples	Ildong Lake
2004	ASA, KOR	(Scotland) Simon Yates	279	−9	1 stroke	(Canada) Rick Gibson (South Korea) Charlie Wi	BA Vista
2003	ASA, KOR	(South Korea) K. J. Choi	201	−15	Playoff	(South Korea) Shin Yong-jin	BA Vista
2002	ASA, KOR	(South Korea) Charlie Wi (2)	272	−16	2 strokes	(Australia) Kim Felton (South Korea) Kevin Na	Lakeside
2001	ASA, KOR	(South Korea) Charlie Wi	281	−7	Playoff	(South Korea) Kang Wook-soon (Scotland) Simon Yates	Ildong Lake
SK Telecom Classic
2000	KOR	(South Korea) Park Nam-sin (2)	275	−13	1 stroke	(South Korea) Mo Joong-kyung	Ildong Lake
1999	KOR	(South Korea) Park Nam-sin	278	−10	Playoff	(South Korea) Kim Wan-tae (South Korea) Park Boo-won	Ildong Lake
1998	KOR	(South Korea) Choi Gwang-soo	269	−19	9 strokes	(South Korea) K. J. Choi (South Korea) Kang Wook-soon	Ildong Lake
1997	KOR	(South Korea) Park No-seok	285	−3	2 strokes	(South Korea) Choi Sang-ho	Ildong Lake
