= Shinhan Donghae Open =

Tournament information
- Location: Incheon, South Korea
- Established: 1981
- Course: Jack Nicklaus Golf Club Korea
- Par: 72
- Length: 7,470 yards (6,830 m)
- Tours: Japan Golf Tour; Asian Tour; Korean Tour
- Format: Stroke play
- Prize fund: ₩1,500,000,000
- Month played: September

Tournament record score
- Aggregate: 262 Park Sang-hyun (2018)
- To par: −22 Park Sang-hyun (2018) −22 Kensei Hirata (2024)

Current champion
- (Japan) Kosuke Sunagawa

Location map
- Location in South Korea

The Shinhan Donghae Open (Korean: 신한동해오픈) is a men's professional golf tournament that has been held annually in South Korea since 1981. It has been an Asian Tour event since 2016, as well as being part of the schedule in 2001 and 2002. It also became the first event to be tri-sanctioned by the Asian Tour, Korean Tour and Japan Golf Tour in 2019. The tournament is sponsored by the Shinhan Financial Group which is a South Korean financial holding company.

== Winners ==
Year	Tour(s) (Note: ASA − Asian Tour; JPN − Japan Golf Tour; KOR – Korean Tour.)	Winner	Score	To par	Margin of victory	Runner(s)-up	Venue
2026	JPN, KOR	(Japan) Kosuke Sunagawa	272	−16	2 strokes	(South Korea) Jang Yu-bin (South Korea) Lee Sang-hee (South Korea) Mun Do-yeob (Japan) Yujiro Ohori	Jack Nicklaus
2025	ASA, JPN, KOR	(Japan) Kazuki Higa (2)	270	−18	1 stroke	(Canada) Richard T. Lee (Zimbabwe) Scott Vincent	Jack Nicklaus
2024	ASA, JPN, KOR	(Japan) Kensei Hirata	266	−22	1 stroke	(Australia) Travis Smyth	Club72
2023	ASA, JPN, KOR	(South Korea) Koh Gun-taek	269	−19	Playoff	(Thailand) Phachara Khongwatmai	Club72
2022	ASA, JPN, KOR	(Japan) Kazuki Higa	264	−20	2 strokes	(South Korea) Cho Min-gyu (Thailand) Tirawat Kaewsiribandit (Canada) Shin Yong-gu	Koma CC
2021	~~JPN~~, (Note: Held without Japan Golf Tour sanctioning due to the COVID-19 pandemic.) KOR	(South Korea) Seo Yo-seop	269	−15	1 stroke	(South Korea) Cho Min-gyu	Bear's Best Cheongna GC
2020	~~ASA~~, ~~JPN~~, (Note: Held without Asian Tour and Japan Golf Tour sanctioning due to the COVID-19 pandemic.) KOR	(South Korea) Kim Han-byeol	270	−14	2 strokes	(Canada) Richard T. Lee	Bear's Best Cheongna GC
2019	ASA, JPN, KOR	(South Africa) Jbe' Kruger	269	−15	2 strokes	(United States) Chan Kim	Bear's Best Cheongna GC
2018	ASA, KOR	(South Korea) Park Sang-hyun	262	−22	5 strokes	(Zimbabwe) Scott Vincent	Bear's Best Cheongna GC
2017	ASA, KOR	(Canada) Richard T. Lee	273	−11	1 stroke	(Malaysia) Gavin Green	Bear's Best Cheongna GC
2016	ASA, KOR	(India) Gaganjeet Bhullar	269	−15	1 stroke	(South Korea) Kim Tae-woo (Zimbabwe) Scott Vincent	Bear's Best Cheongna GC
2015	KOR	(South Korea) An Byeong-hun	272	−12	1 stroke	(South Korea) Noh Seung-yul	Bear's Best Cheongna GC
2014	KOR	(South Korea) Bae Sang-moon (2)	275	−13	5 strokes	(South Korea) Kim Bong-sub (South Korea) Moon Kyong-jun	Jack Nicklaus
2013	KOR	(South Korea) Bae Sang-moon	279	−9	3 strokes	(South Korea) Ryu Hyun-woo	Jack Nicklaus
2012	KOR	(South Korea) Kim Meen-whee	284	−4	Playoff	(United States) Kevin Na	Jack Nicklaus
2011	KOR	(England) Paul Casey	288	E	1 stroke	(South Korea) Kang Sung-hoon (South Korea) Kim Kyung-tae	Jack Nicklaus
2010	KOR	(United States) John Huh	277	−11	2 strokes	(South Korea) K. J. Choi	Lakeside CC
2009	KOR	(South Korea) Ryu Hyun-woo	206 (Note: Shortened to 54 holes due to weather.)	−10	1 stroke	(South Korea) Kim Dae-hyun	Lakeside CC
2008	KOR	(South Korea) K. J. Choi (2)	275	−13	3 strokes	(South Korea) Hur Suk-ho	Lakeside CC
2007	KOR	(South Korea) K. J. Choi	276	−12	1 stroke	(South Korea) Suk Jong-yul	Lakeside CC
2006	KOR	(South Korea) Kang Ji-man	269	−19	1 stroke	(New Zealand) Michael Campbell	Lakeside CC
2005	KOR	(South Korea) Kim Jong-duck	272	−16	Playoff	(South Korea) K. J. Choi	Lakeside CC
2003–04: No tournament
2002	ASA, KOR	(South Korea) Hur Suk-ho	276	−12	Playoff	(Scotland) Simon Yates	Jaeil CC
2001	ASA, KOR	(South Korea) Charlie Wi	276	−12	1 stroke	(India) Vivek Bhandari (South Korea) Yang Yong-eun	Gaya CC
2000	KOR	(South Korea) Yoo Jae-chul	218	+2	1 stroke	(South Korea) Choi Gwang-soo (South Korea) Kang Wook-soon	Lake Hills CC
1998–99: No tournament
1997	KOR	(England) Ed Fryatt	275	−13	Playoff	(United States) Kevin Wentworth	Jaeil CC
1996	KOR	(South Korea) Chung Joon	278	−10	Playoff	(South Korea) Kim Jong-duck	Jaeil CC
1995	KOR	(South Korea) Choi Sang-ho (3)	277	−11	Playoff	(South Korea) K. J. Choi (United States) Mike Tschetter	Hansung CC
1994	KOR	(India) Jeev Milkha Singh	283	−5	4 strokes	(United States) Tom Pernice Jr.	Hansung CC
1993	KOR	(South Korea) Choi Sang-ho (2)	278	−10	1 stroke	(South Korea) Jung Do-man (United States) Gerry Norquist	Hansung CC
1992	KOR	(South Korea) Bong Tae-ha	275	−13	7 strokes	(South Korea) Choi Youn-soo	Hansung CC
1991	KOR	(South Korea) Cho Chul-sang	205	−11	4 strokes	(South Korea) Lee Kang-sun	Hansung CC
1990	KOR	(South Korea) Lee Kang-sun	280	−8	6 strokes	(Australia) Tod Power	Hansung CC
1989	KOR	(Japan) Yoichi Yamamoto	281	−7	1 stroke	(South Korea) Park Nam-sin	Jaeil CC
1988	KOR	(South Korea) Park Nam-sin	279	−9	7 strokes	(South Korea) Kim Hack-suh	Hansung CC
1987	KOR	(South Korea) Choi Youn-soo	272	−16	7 strokes	(Taiwan) Shen Chung-shyan	Jaeil CC
1986	KOR	(Taiwan) Shen Chung-shyan	283	−5	1 stroke	(Taiwan) Yu Chin-han	New Korea CC
1985	KOR	(South Korea) Choi Sang-ho	279	−9	6 strokes	(Japan) Tamada Kouzou	Hansung CC
1984	KOR	(Japan) Seiji Ebihara	279	−9	1 stroke	(South Korea) Kim Seung-il	Namseoul CC
1983	KOR	(South Korea) Lee Myung-ha	285	−3	1 stroke	(South Korea) Kim Suk-bong	Daegu CC
1982	KOR	(South Korea) Han Chang-sang (2)	289	+1	Playoff	(South Korea) Choi Sang-ho (South Korea) Choi Youn-soo	Gwanak CC
1981	KOR	(South Korea) Han Chang-sang	285	−3	2 strokes	(South Korea) Cho Ho-sang	Namseoul CC
