= Lee Soo-min (golfer) =

South Korean professional golfer (born 1993)

Personal information
- Nationality: South Korea
- Born: 12 October 1993 (age 33) Gangwon Province, South Korea

Career
- Sport: Golf
- Turned professional: 2014
- Current tours: European Tour; Asian Tour; Korean Tour
- Professional wins: 6
- Highest ranking: 68 (8 May 2016)

Number of wins by tour
- European Tour: 1
- Other: 5

Best results in major championships
- Masters Tournament: DNP
- PGA Championship: CUT: 2016
- U.S. Open: DNP
- The Open Championship: T79: 2016

Achievements and awards
- Korean Tour Rookie of the Year: 2015

Lee Soo-min (Korean: 이수민; born 12 October 1993) is a South Korean professional golfer.

Lee won the 2013 Gunsan CC Open on the Korean Tour while still an amateur. He turned professional in 2014 and began playing regularly on the Korean Tour, winning the Gunsan CC Open again in 2015. He earned a 2015 Asian Tour card through qualifying school; as a rookie, he recorded two top-three finishes and placed 29th on the Order of Merit.

In February 2016 Lee was joint runner-up in the Maybank Championship Malaysia, an event co-sanctioned by the European Tour and the Asian Tour. In April he won the European Tour's Shenzhen International on a sponsor exemption, giving him full European Tour membership. Two weeks later he lost in a playoff for the GS Caltex Maekyung Open, a Korean Tour/OneAsia Tour event, a result that lifted him to a career-high 68 in the world rankings.

== Amateur wins ==
- 2012 Korean Amateur – Hur Chungkoo Cup

== Professional wins (6) ==
=== European Tour wins (1) ===
No.	Date	Tournament	Winning score	Margin of victory	Runners-up
1	25 Apr 2016	Shenzhen International	−16 (66-65-70-71=272)	2 strokes	(Netherlands) Joost Luiten, (South Africa) Brandon Stone

=== Korean Tour wins (5) ===
No.	Date	Tournament	Winning score	Margin of victory	Runner(s)-up
1	2 Jun 2013	Gunsan CC Open (as an amateur)	−16 (72-68-62-70=272)	2 strokes	(South Korea) Kang Kyung-nam
2	28 Jun 2015	Gunsan CC Open (2)	−14 (68-71-68-67=274)	2 strokes	(South Korea) Lee Ji-hoon
3	6 Oct 2019	Hyundai Insurance KJ Choi Invitational	−15 (68-65-72-68=273)	2 strokes	(South Korea) Lee Dong-min
4	19 Jul 2020	KPGA Open	50 pts (7-10-13-20=50)	Playoff	(South Korea) Kim Han-byeol, (South Korea) Kim Min-kyu
5	6 Oct 2024	Hyundai Insurance KJ Choi Invitational (2)	−9 (66-72-73-68=279)	1 stroke	(South Korea) Jang Yu-bin

Korean Tour playoff record (1–2)

No.	Year	Tournament	Opponent(s)	Result
1	2016	GS Caltex Maekyung Open	(South Korea) Park Sang-hyun	Lost to par on second extra hole
2	2018	Hyundai Insurance KJ Choi Invitational	(South Korea) Lee Hyung-joon, (Australia) Jun Seok Lee, (South Korea) Park Hyo-won, (South Korea) Park Sung-kug	Park Sung-kug won with par on third extra hole Lee Hyung-joon, Lee Soo-min and Park Hyo-won eliminated by birdie on first hole
3	2020	KPGA Open	(South Korea) Kim Han-byeol, (South Korea) Kim Min-kyu	Won with birdie on second extra hole Kim Han-byeol eliminated by birdie on first hole

== Playoff record ==
OneAsia Tour playoff record (0–1)

No.	Year	Tournament	Opponent	Result
1	2016	GS Caltex Maekyung Open	(South Korea) Park Sang-hyun	Lost to par on second extra hole

== Results in major championships ==
Tournament	2016
Masters Tournament	
U.S. Open	
The Open Championship	T79
PGA Championship	CUT

Did not play

CUT = missed the half-way cut
"T" = tied

== Team appearances ==
Amateur

- Bonallack Trophy (representing Asia/Pacific): 2012, 2014
- Eisenhower Trophy (representing South Korea): 2012
