= 2017 Korean Tour =

Golf tour season

2017 Korean Tour season
- Duration: 20 April 2017 – 5 November 2017
- Number of official events: 19
- Most wins: (South Korea) Chang Yi-keun (2) (South Korea) Kim Seung-hyuk (2)
- Order of Merit: (South Korea) Choi Jin-ho
- Player of the Year: (South Korea) Choi Jin-ho
- Rookie of the Year: (South Korea) Chang Yi-keun

The 2017 Korean Tour was the 40th season on the Korean Tour, the main professional golf tour in South Korea since it was formed in 1978.

== European Tour strategic alliance ==
In May, it was announced that the European Tour had entered into a strategic alliance with the Korean PGA. As part of the alliance, it saw the leading player (not otherwise exempt) on the Korean Tour Order of Merit gain European Tour status for the following season.

== Schedule ==
The following table lists official events during the 2017 season.

Date	Tournament	Location	Purse (₩)	Winner (Note: The number in brackets after each winner's name is the number of Korean Tour events they had won up to and including that tournament. This information is only shown for Korean Tour members.)	OWGR points	Other tours (Note: ASA − Asian Tour; ONE − OneAsia Tour.)	Notes
23 Apr	Dongbu Insurance Promy Open	Gyeonggi	500,000,000	(South Korea) Maeng Dong-seop (2)	9		
30 Apr	Eugene Group/All for You Jeonnam Open	South Jeolla	500,000,000	(South Korea) Kim Seng-yong (1)	9		New tournament
7 May	GS Caltex Maekyung Open	Gyeonggi	1,000,000,000	(South Korea) Lee Sang-hee (4)	9	ONE	
21 May	SK Telecom Open	Gyeonggi	1,200,000,000	(South Korea) Choi Jin-ho (7)	9		
28 May	Caido Dream Open	North Jeolla	300,000,000	(South Korea) Kim Woo-hyun (3)	9		New tournament
4 Jun	Kolon Korea Open	South Chungcheong	1,200,000,000	(South Korea) Chang Yi-keun (1)	8	ONE	
11 Jun	Descente Korea Munsingwear Matchplay	South Gyeongsang	1,000,000,000	(South Korea) Kim Seung-hyuk (3)	9		
18 Jun	Caido Golden V1 Open	South Chungcheong	300,000,000	(South Korea) Lee Jung-hwan (1)	9		New tournament
25 Jun	KPGA Championship	South Gyeongsang	1,000,000,000	(South Korea) Hwang Jung-gon (2)	9		
2 Jul	NS HomeShopping Gunsan CC Jeonbuk Open	North Jeolla	500,000,000	(South Korea) Lee Hyung-joon (4)	9		
16 Jul	Jinju Savings Bank-Caido Male Open	South Gyeongsang	300,000,000	(South Korea) Kang Kyung-nam (11)	9		New tournament
27 Aug	Dong-A Membership Group Dynamic Busan Open	South Gyeongsang	700,000,000	(South Korea) Kim Hong-taek (1)	9		New tournament
3 Sep	DGB Financial Group Daegu Gyeongbuk Open	North Gyeongsang	500,000,000	(South Korea) Seo Hyung-seok (1)	9		
10 Sep	T-up Gswing Mega Open	Gyeonggi	500,000,000	(South Korea) Chang Yi-keun (2)	9		New tournament
17 Sep	Shinhan Donghae Open	Gyeonggi	1,200,000,000	(Canada) Richard T. Lee (1)	12	ASA	
24 Sep	Genesis Championship	Gyeonggi	1,500,000,000	(South Korea) Kim Seung-hyuk (4)	9		New tournament
1 Oct	Caido Only Jeju Open	Jeju City	500,000,000	(South Korea) Lee Ji-hoon (1)	9		New tournament
29 Oct	Hyundai Insurance KJ Choi Invitational	South Gyeongsang	750,000,000	(South Korea) Hwang Inn-choon (5)	9		
5 Nov	Caido Tour Championship	Gyeonggi	500,000,000	(South Korea) Choi Go-woong (1)	9		

== Order of Merit ==
The Order of Merit was titled as the Genesis Points and was based on tournament results during the season, calculated using a points-based system. The leading player on the Order of Merit earned status to play on the 2018 European Tour.

Position	Player	Points	Status earned
1	(South Korea) Choi Jin-ho	5,246	Promoted to European Tour
2	(South Korea) Lee Jung-hwan	5,060	
3	(South Korea) Lee Hyung-joon	4,566	
4	(South Korea) Lee Seung-taek	4,364	
5	(South Korea) Byun Jin-jae	4,109	

== Awards ==
Award	Winner	Ref.
Player of the Year (Grand Prize Award)	(South Korea) Choi Jin-ho	
Rookie of the Year (Myeong-chul Award)	(South Korea) Chang Yi-keun	
