= Im Sung-jae =

South Korean golfer (born 1998)

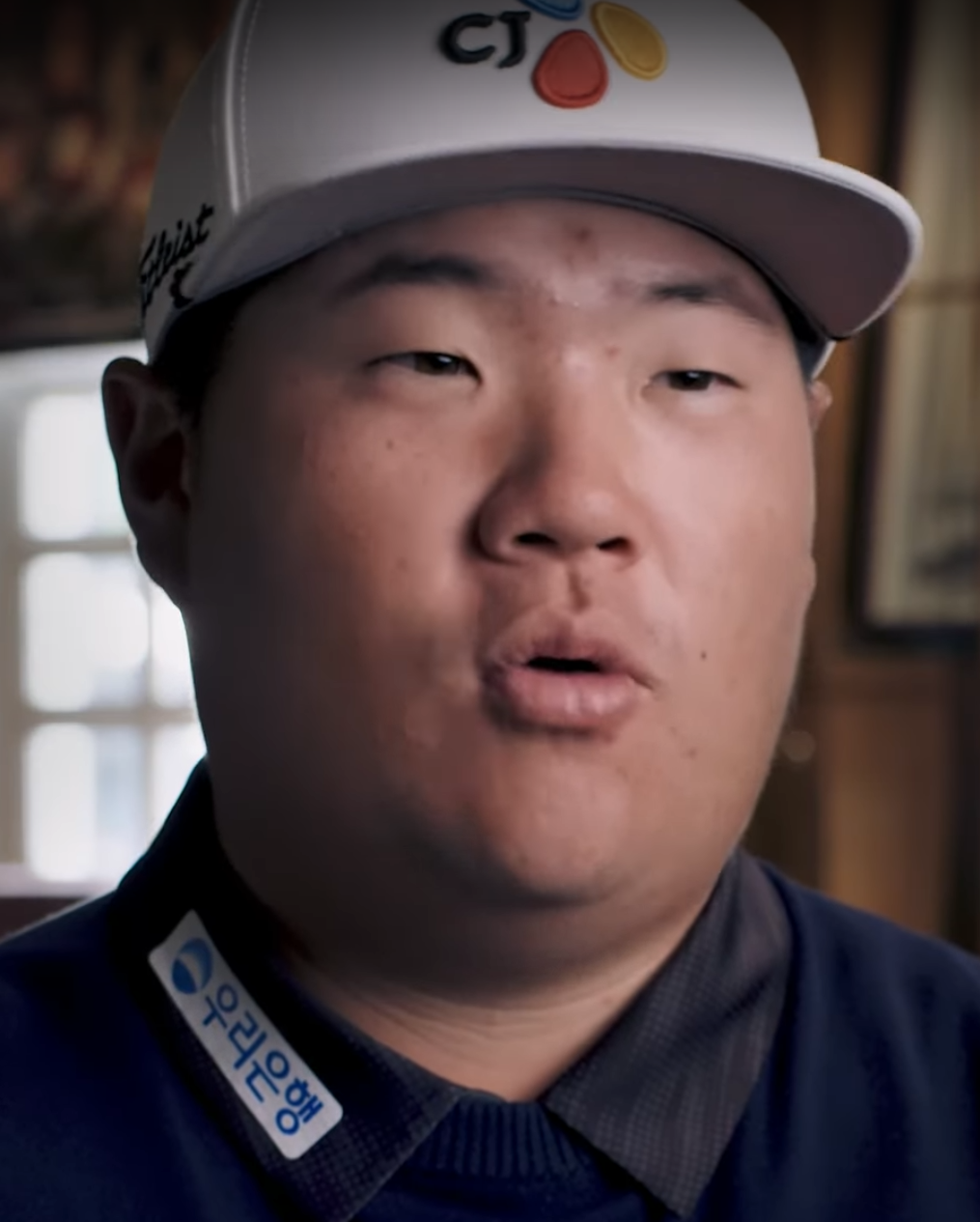
- Im in 2023

Personal information
- Nationality: South Korea
- Born: 30 March 1998 (age 28) Cheongju, South Korea
- Height: 6 ft 0 in (183 cm)
- Weight: 200 lb (91 kg)

Career
- Sport: Golf
- College: Korea National Sport University
- Turned professional: 2015
- Current tours: PGA Tour; Korean Tour
- Former tours: European Tour; Japan Golf Tour; Web.com Tour
- Professional wins: 7
- Highest ranking: 16 (7 February 2021) (as of 25 October 2026)

Number of wins by tour
- PGA Tour: 2
- Korn Ferry Tour: 2
- Other: 3

Best results in major championships
- Masters Tournament: T2: 2020
- PGA Championship: T17: 2021
- U.S. Open: 22nd: 2020
- The Open Championship: T7: 2024

Achievements and awards
- Web.com Tour regular season money list winner: 2018
- Web.com Tour Player of the Year: 2018
- Web.com Tour Rookie of the Year: 2018
- PGA Tour Rookie of the Year: 2018–19
Medal record
Asian Games
Silver medal – second place	2022 Hangzhou	Men's individual
Gold medal – first place	2022 Hangzhou	Men's team

Im Sung-jae (Korean: 임성재; born 30 March 1998), also known as Sungjae Im, is a South Korean professional golfer. Im won twice and was Player of the Year on the 2018 Web.com Tour. He was Rookie of the Year for the 2018–19 PGA Tour, and got his first PGA Tour victory at The Honda Classic in March 2020.

== Professional career ==
Im turned professional in 2015. In 2016 and 2017 he played on the Japan Golf Tour, his best finish being joint runner-up in the 2017 Mynavi ABC Championship. In 2017 he finished 12th in the tour money list and 5th in the scoring average. He played a number of tournaments on the Korean Tour, his best finish being joint runner-up in the 2017 T-up Gswing Mega Open.

In December 2017, Im finished second in the Web.com Tour Q-school, including a third round of 60. He won the first event of the season, The Bahamas Great Exuma Classic, becoming, at 19 years, 292 days, the second youngest winner in Web.com Tour history. Only Jason Day, at 19 years, 238 days, had been a younger winner. Im had three solo runner-up finishes, in The Bahamas Great Abaco Classic, the Knoxville Open and the Pinnacle Bank Championship, and finished the regular season by winning the WinCo Foods Portland Open. He led the regular season money list and was named Web.com Tour Player of the Year.

In the 2018–19 PGA Tour season, Im won the PGA Tour Rookie of the Year. He became just the 13th rookie to qualify for the Tour Championship in the FedEx Cup era, ultimately finishing 19th in the standings. Im led the tour in starts (35) and cuts made (26), and his 118 rounds were 18 more than the nearest competitor. He had seven top-10s in 2019, highlighted by a T-3 at the Arnold Palmer Invitational, and finished 17th in strokes gained. Im joined Stewart Cink (1996–97) as the only players to be named the Korn Ferry Tour Player of the Year and PGA Tour Rookie of the Year in consecutive seasons.

On 22 September 2019, Im lost the Sanderson Farms Championship in Jackson, Mississippi in a playoff to Sebastián Muñoz.

In December 2019, Im played on the International team at the 2019 Presidents Cup at Royal Melbourne Golf Club in Australia. The U.S. team won 16–14. Im went 3–1–1 and won his Sunday singles match against Gary Woodland.

On 1 March 2020, Im won The Honda Classic at PGA National Resort and Spa in Palm Beach Gardens, Florida, with a final round of 66 and an overall score of −6. He finished one stroke ahead of Mackenzie Hughes, and moved to second place in the FedEx Cup standings.

In November 2020, Im finished tied for second place at the Masters Tournament; five shots behind Dustin Johnson.

On 10 October 2021, Im won the Shriners Children's Open at TPC Summerlin in Las Vegas, Nevada for his second PGA Tour title in his 100th start. Im shot a final round 9-under 62 and won by four shots over Matthew Wolff, coming from three behind at the start of the day.

Im qualified for the International team at the 2022 Presidents Cup; he won two, tied one and lost two of the five matches he played.

In May 2023, Im travelled to South Korea, the week before the PGA Championship to play in the Woori Financial Group Championship on the Korean Tour. He shot a final-round 68, including an up-and-down birdie on the final hole to win by one shot.

== Professional wins (7) ==
=== PGA Tour wins (2) ===
No.	Date	Tournament	Winning score	Margin of victory	Runner-up
1	1 Mar 2020	The Honda Classic	−6 (72-66-70-66=274)	1 stroke	(Canada) Mackenzie Hughes
2	10 Oct 2021	Shriners Children's Open	−24 (63-65-70-62=260)	4 strokes	(United States) Matthew Wolff

PGA Tour playoff record (0–1)

No.	Year	Tournament	Opponent	Result
1	2019	Sanderson Farms Championship	(Colombia) Sebastián Muñoz	Lost to par on first extra hole

=== Web.com Tour wins (2) ===
No.	Date	Tournament	Winning score	Margin of victory	Runner-up
1	16 Jan 2018	The Bahamas Great Exuma Classic	−13 (69-69-72-65=275)	4 strokes	(Mexico) Carlos Ortiz
2	19 Aug 2018	WinCo Foods Portland Open	−18 (65-66-68-67=266)	4 strokes	(United States) John Chin

=== Korean Tour wins (3) ===
No.	Date	Tournament	Winning score	Margin of victory	Runner(s)-up
1	13 Oct 2019	Genesis Championship	−6 (70-74-71-67=282)	2 strokes	(South Korea) Kwon Sung-yeol, (South Korea) Moon Kyong-jun
2	14 May 2023	Woori Financial Group Championship	−10 (71-69-70-68=278)	1 stroke	(Australia) Jun Seok Lee
3	28 Apr 2024	Woori Financial Group Championship (2)	−11 (70-67-71-69=277)	1 stroke	(South Korea) Lee Jung-hwan, (South Korea) Moon Dong-hyun (a)

Korean Tour playoff record (0–1)

No.	Year	Tournament	Opponents	Result
1	2023	Genesis Championship	(South Korea) Bae Yong-jun, (South Korea) Park Sang-hyun	Park won with eagle on second extra hole Im eliminated by birdie on first hole

== Playoff record ==
Asian Tour playoff record (0–1)

No.	Year	Tournament	Opponent	Result
1	2026	SJM Macao Open	(Taiwan) Wang Wei-hsuan	Lost to birdie on first extra hole

== Results in major championships ==
Results not in chronological order before 2019 and in 2020.

Tournament	2018	2019	2020	2021	2022	2023	2024	2025	2026
Masters Tournament			T2	CUT	T8	T16	CUT	T5	46
PGA Championship	T42	CUT	CUT	T17		CUT	CUT	CUT	CUT
U.S. Open	CUT		22	T35	CUT	CUT	CUT	T57	T43
The Open Championship		CUT	NT		T81	T20	T7	T52	T14

Top 10
Did not play

CUT = missed the half-way cut
"T" indicates a tie for a place
NT = no tournament due to COVID-19 pandemic

=== Summary ===
Tournament	Wins	2nd	3rd	Top-5	Top-10	Top-25	Events	Cuts made
Masters Tournament	0	1	0	2	3	4	7	5
PGA Championship	0	0	0	0	0	1	8	2
U.S. Open	0	0	0	0	0	1	8	4
The Open Championship	0	0	0	0	1	3	6	5
Totals	0	1	0	2	4	9	29	16

- Most consecutive cuts made – 3 (twice)
- Longest streak of top-10s – 2 (2024 Open Championship – 2025 Masters)

== Results in The Players Championship ==
Tournament	2019	2020	2021	2022	2023	2024	2025	2026
The Players Championship	CUT	C	T17	T55	T6	T31	T61	CUT

Top 10

CUT = missed the halfway cut
"T" indicates a tie for a place
C = cancelled after the first round due to the COVID-19 pandemic

== Results in World Golf Championships ==
Tournament	2019	2020	2021	2022	2023
Championship		T29	T28		
Match Play		NT^{1}	T42	T35	T17
Invitational		T35	T46		
Champions	T11	NT^{1}	NT^{1}	NT^{1}	

^{1}Cancelled due to COVID-19 pandemic

Did not play

NT = No tournament
"T" = Tied
Note that the Championship and Invitational were discontinued from 2022. The Champions was discontinued from 2023.

== Team appearances ==
Professional

- Presidents Cup (representing the International team): 2019, 2022, 2024, 2026

== See also ==
- 2018 Web.com Tour Finals graduates
