= 2015 Korean Tour =

Golf tour season

2015 Korean Tour season
- Duration: 23 April 2015 – 8 November 2015
- Number of official events: 12
- Order of Merit: (South Korea) Lee Tae-hee
- Player of the Year: (South Korea) Lee Tae-hee
- Rookie of the Year: (South Korea) Lee Soo-min

The 2015 Korean Tour was the 38th season on the Korean Tour, the main professional golf tour in South Korea since it was formed in 1978.

== Schedule ==
The following table lists official events during the 2015 season.

Date	Tournament	Location	Purse (₩)	Winner (Note: The number in brackets after each winner's name is the number of Korean Tour events they had won up to and including that tournament. This information is only shown for Korean Tour members.)	OWGR points	Other tours (Note: ONE − OneAsia Tour.)	Notes
26 Apr	Dongbu Insurance Promy Open	Gyeonggi	400,000,000	(South Korea) Hur In-hoi (3)	7		
17 May	GS Caltex Maekyung Open	Gyeonggi	1,000,000,000	(South Korea) Moon Kyong-jun (1)	7	ONE	
24 May	SK Telecom Open	Gyeonggi	1,000,000,000	(South Korea) Choi Jin-ho (4)	8	ONE	
7 Jun	Nefs Heritage	Gangwon	632,367,000	(South Korea) Lee Tae-hee (1)	7		New tournament
21 Jun	Vainer Open	Jeju	500,000,000	(South Korea) Park Jae-bum (1)	7		
28 Jun	Gunsan CC Open	North Jeolla	500,000,000	(South Korea) Lee Soo-min (2)	7		
30 Aug	KPGA Championship	South Gyeongsang	800,000,000	(South Korea) Jang Dong-kyu (1)	7		
6 Sep	Maeil Dairies Open	South Chungcheong	300,000,000	(South Korea) Kim Dae-hyun (4)	6		
13 Sep	Kolon Korea Open	South Chungcheong	1,200,000,000	(South Korea) Lee Kyoung-hoon (1)	7	ONE	
20 Sep	Shinhan Donghae Open	Gyeonggi	1,000,000,000	(South Korea) An Byeong-hun (1)	9		
4 Oct	Descente Korea Munsingwear Matchplay Championship	South Gyeongsang	800,000,000	(South Korea) Lee Hyung-joon (2)	6		
8 Nov	Caido Golf LIS Tour Championship	South Jeolla	300,000,000	(South Korea) Kim Tae-hoon (2)	6		

== Order of Merit ==
The Order of Merit was titled as the Ballantine's Points and was based on tournament results during the season, calculated using a points-based system.

Position	Player	Points
1	(South Korea) Lee Tae-hee	2,190
2	(South Korea) Lee Soo-min	2,185
3	(South Korea) Choi Jin-ho	1,830
4	(South Korea) Moon Kyong-jun	1,730
5	(South Korea) Park Jae-bum	1,665

== Awards ==
Award	Winner	Ref.
Player of the Year (Grand Prize Award)	(South Korea) Lee Tae-hee	
Rookie of the Year (Myeong-chul Award)	(South Korea) Lee Soo-min	
