= Hwang Jung-gon =

South Korean golfer (born 1992)

Personal information
- Nationality: South Korea
- Born: 16 May 1992 (age 34)
- Height: 1.78 m (5 ft 10 in)
- Weight: 75 kg (165 lb; 11.8 st)

Career
- Sport: Golf
- Turned professional: 2009
- Current tours: Asian Tour; Korean Tour
- Former tour: Japan Golf Tour
- Professional wins: 7
- Highest ranking: 94 (29 December 2019)

Number of wins by tour
- Japan Golf Tour: 4
- Other: 3

Best results in major championships
- Masters Tournament: DNP
- PGA Championship: DNP
- U.S. Open: CUT: 2013
- The Open Championship: 71st: 2011

Hwang Jung-gon (Korean: 황중곤; born 16 May 1992) is a South Korean professional golfer.

== Career ==
Hwang played on the Japan Golf Tour and won his first title at the 2011 Gateway to The Open Mizuno Open. This win earned him entry into the 2011 Open Championship where he finished 71st.

Hwang ended his 2019 season with a T8 at the Golf Nippon Series JT Cup, his last event before starting mandatory military service.

== Professional wins (7) ==
=== Japan Golf Tour wins (4) ===
No.	Date	Tournament	Winning score	Margin of victory	Runner-up
1	26 Jun 2011	Gateway to The Open Mizuno Open	−13 (74-67-68-66=275)	1 stroke	(South Korea) Kim Kyung-tae
2	25 Nov 2012	Casio World Open	−19 (65-70-68-66=269)	3 strokes	(Japan) Kunihiro Kamii
3	29 Nov 2015	Casio World Open (2)	−15 (70-67-70-66=273)	1 stroke	(Japan) Ryo Ishikawa
4	3 Nov 2019	Mynavi ABC Championship	−19 (66-70-66-67=269)	1 stroke	(Japan) Shugo Imahira

Japan Golf Tour playoff record (0–2)

No.	Year	Tournament	Opponent(s)	Result
1	2018	Golf Nippon Series JT Cup	(Japan) Ryo Ishikawa, (Japan) Satoshi Kodaira	Kodaira won with birdie on first extra hole
2	2019	Japan PGA Championship	(Japan) Ryo Ishikawa	Lost to eagle on first extra hole

=== Korean Tour wins (3) ===
No.	Date	Tournament	Winning score	Margin of victory	Runner(s)-up
1	10 Aug 2014	Maeil Dairies Open	−13 (68-64-68-67=267)	6 strokes	(South Korea) Kim Gi-whan, (South Korea) Song Young-han
2	25 Jun 2017	KPGA Championship	−20 (66-70-65-67=268)	1 stroke	(South Korea) Kim Gi-whan, (South Korea) Lee Hyung-joon
3	3 Jul 2022	Asiad CC Busan Open	−14 (68-67-65-70=270)	Playoff	(South Korea) Kwon O-sang

Korean Tour playoff record (1–3)

No.	Year	Tournament	Opponent(s)	Result
1	2018	GS Caltex Maekyung Open	(India) Gaganjeet Bhullar, (South Korea) Chang Yi-keun, (South Korea) Park Sang-hyun	Park won with par on third extra hole Hwang eliminated by birdie on second hole Bhullar eliminated by par on first hole
2	2022	Asiad CC Busan Open	(South Korea) Kwon O-sang	Won with birdie on third extra hole
3	2023	LX Championship	(South Korea) Kim Bi-o	Lost to par on second extra hole
4	2025	Lexus Masters	(South Korea) Choi Jin-ho, (South Korea) Kim Jae-ho, (South Korea) Lee Yu-seok	Kim won with birdie on first extra hole

== Playoff record ==
Asian Tour playoff record (0–1)

No.	Year	Tournament	Opponents	Result
1	2018	GS Caltex Maekyung Open	(India) Gaganjeet Bhullar, (South Korea) Chang Yi-keun, (South Korea) Park Sang-hyun	Park won with par on third extra hole Hwang eliminated by birdie on second hole Bhullar eliminated by par on first hole

== Results in major championships ==
Tournament	2011	2012	2013
U.S. Open			CUT
The Open Championship	71		

CUT = missed the halfway cut
Note: Hwang never played in the Masters Tournament or the PGA Championship.

== Results in World Golf Championships ==
Tournament	2011
Match Play	
Championship	
Invitational	
Champions	T49

Did not play

"T" = Tied
