= Jae-beom =

- Hangul: 재범
- RR: Jaebeom
- MR: Chaebŏm

Jae-beom, also spelled Jae-bum, is a Korean given name.

People with this name include:

- Yim Jae-beom (born 1963), South Korean singer
- Shin Che-bon (born 1971), South Korean football player
- Brian Tee (born Jaebeom Takata, 1977), American actor
- Park Jae-bum (golfer) (born 1982), South Korean golfer
- Kim Jae-bum (born 1985), South Korean judoka
- Jay Park (born Park Jaebeom, 1987), American singer and dancer
- Jay B (born Lim Jae-beom, 1994), South Korean singer, member of boy band Got7

== See also ==
- List of Korean given names
