= Choi Jin-ho (golfer) =

South Korean professional golfer

Personal information
- Nationality: South Korea
- Born: 27 May 1984 (age 42) Seoul, South Korea
- Height: 5 ft 11 in (1.80 m)

Career
- Sport: Golf
- Turned professional: 2005
- Current tours: Asian Tour; Korean Tour
- Former tour: European Tour
- Professional wins: 8

Achievements and awards
- Korean Tour Rookie of the Year: 2006
- Korean Tour Order of Merit winner: 2016, 2017
- OneAsia Tour Order of Merit winner: 2016

Choi Jin-ho (Korean: 최진호; born 27 May 1984), also known as Choi Jinho or Jinho Choi, is a South Korean professional golfer. He plays on the Korean Tour and Asian Tour and formerly played on the European Tour. He is from Seoul, South Korea.

== Professional career ==
Choi turned professional in 2005. He won his first professional victory at Daemyung Vivaldi Park CC in October 2006 on the Korean Tour and earned the 2006 Korean Tour Rookie of the Year Award.

After appearing in the winning Asian-Pacific team against China in the Dongfeng Nissan Cup at the CTS Tycoon Club in Shenzhen, China, in late 2012, Choi was forced to a 20 months break from golf due to mandatory military service in South Korea.

Besides playing on the Korean Tour, three appearances on the OneAsia Tour in 2016 was enough to earn Choi victory in the OneAsia Tour Order of Merit. Finishing on top of the Korean Tour Order of Merit in 2017, as well as in 2016, earned him a European Tour card for 2018. His 2017 Korean season included his second victory at the SK Telecom Open, one of the richest tournaments on the tour, along with four other top-five finishes.

A tied 8th at the 2017 Joburg Open in South Africa lifted him to a career best 195th on the Official World Golf Ranking. He finished tied 7th on the 2018 Volvo China Open, co-sanctioned by the European Tour and the Asian Tour, and tied 2nd at the 2019 Qatar Masters on the European Tour.

Despite one second-place finish, Choi finished outside of qualifying for next year through the 2019 European Tour Race to Dubai rankings. However, Choi qualified for the 2020 European Tour by finishing tied 10th at the 2019 qualifying school, but only played two early tournaments on the 2020 season.

== Professional wins (8) ==
=== Korean Tour wins (8) ===
| No. | Date | Tournament | Winning score | Margin of victory | Runner(s)-up |
|---|---|---|---|---|---|
| 1 | 15 Oct 2006 | SBS Vivaldi Park Open | −12 (68-69-68-71=276) | 1 stroke | (South Korea) Lee Jin-won, (South Korea) Lee Seong-ho |
| 2 | 27 Aug 2010 | Lake Hills Open | −7 (73-67-71-70=281) | 1 stroke | (South Korea) Kim Bi-o, (South Korea) Kim Wi-joong |
| 3 | 3 Jun 2012 | Meritz Solmoro Open | −8 (70-71-66-69=276) | 2 strokes | (South Korea) Kang Kyung-nam |
| 4 | 24 May 2015 | SK Telecom Open^{1} | −10 (68-68-70-72=278) | 1 stroke | (South Korea) Lee Soo-min |
| 5 | 24 Apr 2016 | Dongbu Insurance Promy Open | −17 (67-66-67-71=271) | 3 strokes | (South Korea) Lee Chang-woo |
| 6 | 29 May 2016 | Nefs Heritage | −17 (68-64-71-68=271) | 8 strokes | (United States) Hong Chang-kyu, (South Korea) Lee Sung-ho |
| 7 | 21 May 2017 | SK Telecom Open (2) | −19 (69-67-67-66=269) | 2 strokes | (South Korea) Park Sang-hyun |
| 8 | 18 Sep 2022 | Bizplay Electronic Times Open | −12 (67-68-69=204) (Note: Shortened to 54 holes due to weather.) | 1 stroke | (South Korea) Jeon Seong-hyeon |

^{1}Co-sanctioned by the OneAsia Tour

Korean Tour playoff record (0–1)

| No. | Year | Tournament | Opponents | Result |
|---|---|---|---|---|
| 1 | 2025 | Lexus Masters | (South Korea) Hwang Jung-gon, (South Korea) Kim Jae-ho, (South Korea) Lee Yu-seok | Kim won with birdie on first extra hole |

== Team appearances ==
Professional

- Dongfeng Nissan Cup (representing Asia-Pacific): 2012 (winners)
