= KJ Choi Invitational =

Hyundai Insurance KJ Choi Invitational
Tournament information
- Location: Yeoju, South Korea
- Established: 2011
- Course: Ferrum Club
- Par: 72
- Length: 7,216 yards (6,598 m)
- Tours: Korean Tour; Asian Tour
- Format: Stroke play
- Prize fund: ₩1,250,000,000
- Month played: October

Tournament record score
- Aggregate: 267 Park Sang-hyun (2014)
- To par: −21 as above

Current champion
- (South Korea) Wang Jeung-hun

Location map
- Location in South Korea

The KJ Choi Invitational is a golf tournament on the Korean Tour. It was co-sanctioned by the Asian Tour from 2011 to 2013. It was played for the first time in October 2011 at the Haesley Nine Bridges Golf Club in Yeoju, South Korea. The tournament is hosted by South Korean golfer K. J. Choi, who also won the first two events. The purse in 2018 was ₩1,000,000,000.

== Winners ==
Year	Tour(s) (Note: ASA − Asian Tour; KOR − Korean Tour.)	Winner	Score	To par	Margin of victory	Runner(s)-up	Venue
Hyundai Insurance KJ Choi Invitational
2026	KOR	(South Korea) Wang Jeung-hun	278	−10	3 strokes	(South Korea) Kim Hong-taek	Ferrum
2025	KOR	(South Korea) Jeon Ga-lam	274	−14	1 stroke	(South Korea) Kim Baek-jun (Canada) Richard T. Lee	Ferrum
2024	KOR	(South Korea) Lee Soo-min (2)	279	−9	1 stroke	(South Korea) Jang Yu-bin	Ferrum
2023	KOR	(South Korea) Ham Jeong-woo	282	−6	1 stroke	(South Korea) Choi Jin-ho	Ferrum
2022	KOR	(South Korea) Lee Hyung-joon	278	−10	Playoff	(South Korea) Lee Dong-min	Ferrum
2021	KOR	(South Korea) Ham Jeong-woo	273	−15	2 strokes	(South Korea) Joo Heung-chol	Ferrum
2020	KOR	(South Korea) Lee Chang-woo	285	−3	Playoff	(South Korea) Chun Jae-han (South Korea) Kim Tae-hoon	Ferrum
2019	KOR	(South Korea) Lee Soo-min	273	−15	2 strokes	(South Korea) Lee Dong-min	Jeongsan
2018	KOR	(South Korea) Park Sung-kug	284	−4	Playoff	(South Korea) Lee Hyung-joon (Australia) Jun Seok Lee (South Korea) Lee Soo-min (South Korea) Park Hyo-won	Jeongsan
2017	KOR	(South Korea) Hwang Inn-choon	277	−11	Playoff	(South Korea) Choi Min-chel (South Korea) Kang Sung-hoon	Jeongsan
2016	KOR	(South Korea) Joo Heung-chol	271	−13	1 stroke	(South Korea) Kim Si-woo (South Korea) Mun Do-yeob	88 CC
KJ Choi Invitational
2015: No tournament
2014	KOR	(South Korea) Park Sang-hyun	267	−21	2 strokes	(South Korea) Kim Tae-hoon	Lake Hills Suncheon
CJ Invitational
2013	ASA, KOR	(South Korea) Kang Sung-hoon	276	−12	5 strokes	(South Korea) Kim Tae-hoon (India) Jyoti Randhawa	Haesley Nine Bridges
2012	ASA, KOR	(South Korea) K. J. Choi (2)	269	−15	2 strokes	(South Korea) Jang Dong-kyu (South Korea) Bae Sang-moon	Haesley Nine Bridges
2011	ASA, KOR	(South Korea) K. J. Choi	271	−17	2 strokes	(South Korea) Noh Seung-yul	Haesley Nine Bridges
