= Hur In-hoi =

South Korean golfer (born 1987)

Personal information
- Nationality: South Korea
- Born: 24 July 1987 (age 39) Yeoju, Gyeonggi-do, South Korea
- Height: 1.80 m (5 ft 11 in)
- Weight: 67 kg (148 lb; 10.6 st)

Career
- Sport: Golf
- Turned professional: 2006
- Current tour: Korean Tour
- Former tour: Japan Golf Tour
- Professional wins: 8

Number of wins by tour
- Japan Golf Tour: 1
- Other: 7

Hur In-hoi (Korean: 허인회; born 24 July 1987) is a South Korean professional golfer.

== Career ==
Hur plays on the Korean Tour where he has four wins. He also played on the Japan Golf Tour where he had one win.

== Professional wins (8) ==
=== Japan Golf Tour wins (1) ===
No.	Date	Tournament	Winning score	Margin of victory	Runner-up
1	12 Oct 2014	Toshin Golf Tournament	−28 (64-63-66-67=260)	4 strokes	(South Korea) Kim Seung-hyuk

=== Korean Tour wins (6) ===
No.	Date	Tournament	Winning score	Margin of victory	Runner(s)-up
1	15 Jun 2008	Philos Open	−13 (66-72-70-67=275)	1 stroke	(South Korea) Hur Suk-ho, (South Korea) Kang Wook-soon
2	1 Nov 2013	Herald KYJ Tour Championship	−12 (71-65-69-71=276)	4 strokes	(South Korea) Choi Joon-woo, (South Korea) Kim Gi-whan, (South Korea) Kim Hyung-tae
3	26 Apr 2015	Dongbu Insurance Promy Open	−7 (75-71-67-68=281)	Playoff	(South Korea) Park Hyo-won
4	9 May 2021	GS Caltex Maekyung Open	−5 (71-66-67-75=279)	2 strokes	(South Korea) Tom Kim
5	24 Sep 2023	iMBank Open	−20 (67-66-69-62=264)	4 strokes	(South Korea) Lee Jung-hwan
6	30 Jun 2024	Bizplay-One The Club Open	−17 (66-68-68-65=267)	Playoff	(South Korea) Jang Yu-bin

Korean Tour playoff record (2–0)

No.	Year	Tournament	Opponent	Result
1	2015	Dongbu Insurance Promy Open	(South Korea) Park Hyo-won	Won with par on second extra hole
2	2024	Bizplay-One The Club Open	(South Korea) Jang Yu-bin	Won with birdie on second extra hole

=== Japan Challenge Tour wins (1) ===
No.	Date	Tournament	Winning score	Margin of victory	Runner-up
1	19 Oct 2012	JGTO Novil Final	−11 (67-70-68=205)	3 strokes	(Japan) Tomohiko Ogata
