= Kim Seung-hyuk =

South Korean golfer

Personal information
- Nationality: South Korea
- Born: 5 April 1986 (age 40) Busan, South Korea
- Height: 1.75 m (5 ft 9 in)
- Weight: 70 kg (150 lb; 11 st)

Career
- Sport: Golf
- Turned professional: 2004
- Current tours: Japan Golf Tour; Korean Tour
- Former tour: OneAsia Tour
- Professional wins: 5

Number of wins by tour
- Japan Golf Tour: 1
- Other: 4

Achievements and awards
- Korean Tour Order of Merit winner: 2014
- Korean Tour Rookie of the Year: 2014
- Japan Golf Tour Rookie of the Year: 2014
- OneAsia Tour Order of Merit winner: 2014

Kim Seung-hyuk (Korean: 김승혁; born 5 April 1986) is a South Korean professional golfer.

== Career ==
Kim plays on the Japan Golf Tour and Korean Tour. In 2014, he won the SK Telecom Open and the Kolon Korea Open, both co-sanctioned by the Korean and OneAsia Tours, and the Top Cup Tokai Classic on the Japan Golf Tour. He finished 2014 as the leading money winner on both the Korean Tour and the OneAsia Tour and 16th on the Japan Golf Tour.

== Professional wins (5) ==
=== Japan Golf Tour wins (1) ===
No.	Date	Tournament	Winning score	Margin of victory	Runners-up
1	5 Oct 2014	Top Cup Tokai Classic	−7 (66-73-72-70=281)	1 stroke	(South Korea) Hwang Jung-gon, (South Korea) Kim Hyung-sung

=== OneAsia Tour wins (2) ===
No.	Date	Tournament	Winning score	Margin of victory	Runner(s)-up
1	18 May 2014	SK Telecom Open^{1}	−11 (66-74-67-70=277)	1 stroke	(South Korea) Kim Kyung-tae, (South Korea) Lee Tae-hee
2	26 Oct 2014	Kolon Korea Open^{1}	−2 (73-68-71-70=282)	2 strokes	(South Korea) Noh Seung-yul

^{1}Co-sanctioned by the Korean Tour

=== Korean Tour wins (4) ===
No.	Date	Tournament	Winning score	Margin of victory	Runner(s)-up
1	18 May 2014	SK Telecom Open^{1}	−11 (66-74-67-70=277)	1 stroke	(South Korea) Kim Kyung-tae, (South Korea) Lee Tae-hee
2	26 Oct 2014	Kolon Korea Open^{1}	−2 (73-68-71-70=282)	2 strokes	(South Korea) Noh Seung-yul
3	11 Jun 2017	Descente Korea Munsingwear Matchplay	19 holes		(South Korea) Lee Jung-hwan
4	24 Sep 2017	Genesis Championship	−18 (64-67-68-71=270)	8 strokes	(South Korea) Cho Min-gyu, (United States) Seungsu Han, (South Korea) Kang Kyung-nam

^{1}Co-sanctioned by the OneAsia Tour

Korean Tour playoff record (0–1)

No.	Year	Tournament	Opponent	Result
1	2017	Caido Golden V1 Open	(South Korea) Lee Jung-hwan	Lost to par on first extra hole
