= DB Insurance Promy Open =

Korean golf tournament

Tournament information
- Location: Chuncheon, South Korea
- Established: 2010
- Course: La Vie est Belle Resort
- Par: 71
- Length: 7,129 yards (6,519 m)
- Tour: Korean Tour
- Format: Stroke play
- Prize fund: ₩700,000,000
- Month played: April

Tournament record score
- Aggregate: 265 Lee Sang-yeop (2026)
- To par: −23 as above
- Score: 4 and 3 Kang Kyung-sool (2008)

Current champion
- (South Korea) Lee Sang-yeop

Location map
- Location in South Korea

The DB Insurance Promy Open is a professional golf tournament that takes place in South Korea sponsored by DB Insurance. Until 2017 it was called the Dongbu Insurance Promy Open. It has been held at Montvert Country Club from 2015 to 2019. Since 2014 it has been the opening event of the season, held in April. In 2010 and 2011 the event had prize money of ₩300,000,000, rising to ₩400,000,000 in 2012 and ₩500,000,000 in 2016. The event was cancelled in 2020 but returned in 2021 with prize money of ₩700,000,000 and a new venue, Oak Valley Country Club.

In 2008 and 2009 Dongbu Insurance sponsored a match play event, the SBS Dongbu Insurance Matchplay Championship, the forerunner of the Munsingwear Championship which started in 2010. Prize money was ₩300,000,000 in both years. In 2006 and 2007 they sponsored a 36-hole end-of-season invitational event which included seniors. They also sponsored the KPGA Championship in 2005.

== Winners ==
Year	Winner	Score	To par	Margin of victory	Runner(s)-up	Venue
DB Insurance Promy Open
2026	(South Korea) Lee Sang-yeop	265	−23	2 strokes	(South Korea) Ok Tae-hoon	La Vie est Belle
2025	(South Korea) Kim Baek-jun	273	−11	2 strokes	(South Korea) Lee Sang-hee (South Korea) Ok Tae-hoon	La Vie est Belle
2024	(South Korea) Yoon Sang-pil	266	−18	4 strokes	(South Korea) Park Sang-hyun	La Vie est Belle
2023	(South Korea) Koh Gun-taek	268	−20	2 strokes	(South Korea) Park Sang-hyun	La Vie est Belle
2022	(South Korea) Park Sang-hyun	274	−10	1 stroke	(South Korea) Cho Sung-min (South Korea) Lee Hyung-joon (Australia) Jun Seok Lee	La Vie est Belle
2021	(South Korea) Mun Do-yeob	277	−11	3 strokes	(South Korea) Tom Kim	Oak Valley
2020	Cancelled due to COVID-19 pandemic					
2019	(Canada) Richard T. Lee	274	−14	1 stroke	(South Korea) Kim Jae-ho	Montvert
2018	(South Korea) Jeon Ga-lam	273	−15	4 strokes	(South Korea) Park Hyo-won	Montvert
Dongbu Insurance Promy Open
2017	(South Korea) Maeng Dong-seop	269	−19	3 strokes	(South Korea) Park Il-hwan	Montvert
2016	(South Korea) Choi Jin-ho	271	−17	3 strokes	(South Korea) Lee Chang-woo	Montvert
2015	(South Korea) Hur In-hoi	281	−7	Playoff	(South Korea) Park Hyo-won	Montvert
2014	(South Korea) Lee Dong-min	279	−9	3 strokes	(South Korea) Lee Sung-ho	Welli Hilli
2013	(South Korea) Lee Chang-woo (a)	274	−14	1 stroke	(South Korea) Song Young-han	Welli Hilli
2012	(South Korea) Kim Dae-sub	273	−15	4 strokes	(South Korea) Kim Do-hoon 753	Welli Hilli
2011	(South Korea) Kang Kyung-nam	280	−8	6 strokes	(South Korea) Lee Dong-min	Welli Hilli
Dongbu Insurance Promy Gunsan CC Open
2010	(South Korea) Kim Do-hoon 752	277	−11	Playoff	(South Korea) Kang Kyung-nam (South Korea) Kang Wook-soon	Gunsan
SBS Dongbu Insurance Guncan CC Matchplay Championship
2009	(South Korea) Lee Ki-sang	2 and 1			(South Korea) Jung Jae-hoon	Gunsan
SBS Dongbu Insurance Eden Valley Resort Matchplay Championship
2008	(South Korea) Kang Kyung-sool	4 and 3			(South Korea) Kang Kyung-nam	Eden Valley
