= 2024 Korean Tour =

Golf tour season

2024 Korean Tour season
- Duration: 11 April 2024 – 10 November 2024
- Number of official events: 22 (Note: One further tournament was removed from the schedule.)
- Most wins: (South Korea) Jang Yu-bin (2) (South Korea) Kim Min-kyu (2)
- Order of Merit: (South Korea) Jang Yu-bin
- Player of the Year: (South Korea) Jang Yu-bin
- Rookie of the Year: (South Korea) Song Min-hyuk

The 2024 Korean Tour was the 47th season on the Korean Tour, the main professional golf tour in South Korea since it was formed in 1978.

== Schedule ==
The following table lists official events during the 2024 season.

| Date | Tournament | Location | Purse (₩) | Winner (Note: The number in brackets after each winner's name is the number of Korean Tour events they had won up to and including that tournament. This information is only shown for Korean Tour members.) | OWGR points | Other tours (Note: ASA − Asian Tour; EUR − European Tour; JPN − Japan Golf Tour.) | Notes |
|---|---|---|---|---|---|---|---|
| 14 Apr | DB Insurance Promy Open | Gangwon | 700,000,000 | (South Korea) Yoon Sang-pil (1) | 4.89 | | |
| ~~21 Apr~~ | Korea Championship | Gyeonggi | – | Removed (Note: In April 2024, the Korea Championship was merged with the Genesis Championship, which was added to the European Tour schedule as a co-sanctioned event.) | – | EUR | |
| 21 Apr | KPGA Founders Cup | North Gyeongsang | 700,000,000 | (South Korea) Koh Gun-taek (4) | 4.33 | | New tournament |
| 28 Apr | Woori Financial Group Championship | Gyeonggi | 1,500,000,000 | (South Korea) Im Sung-jae (3) | 5.34 | | |
| 5 May | GS Caltex Maekyung Open | Jeju | 1,300,000,000 | (South Korea) Kim Hong-taek (2) | 7.51 | ASA | |
| 12 May | KPGA Classic | North Gyeongsang | 700,000,000 | (South Korea) Kim Chan-woo (2) | 4.08 | | New tournament |
| 19 May | SK Telecom Open | Jeju | 1,300,000,000 | (South Korea) K. J. Choi (17) | 4.96 | | |
| 26 May | KB Financial Liiv Championship | Gyeonggi | 700,000,000 | (United States) Seungsu Han (3) | 4.64 | | |
| 2 Jun | Descente Korea Munsingwear Matchplay | North Chungcheong | 800,000,000 | (South Korea) Kim Min-kyu (2) | 3.72 | | |
| 9 Jun | KPGA Championship | South Gyeongsang | 1,500,000,000 | (South Korea) Jeon Ga-lam (3) | 5.14 | | |
| 16 Jun | Hana Bank Invitational | Gangwon | 1,300,000,000 | (Japan) Takashi Ogiso (n/a) | 8.16 | JPN | |
| 23 Jun | Kolon Korea Open | South Chungcheong | 1,400,000,000 | (South Korea) Kim Min-kyu (3) | 7.74 | ASA | |
| 30 Jun | Bizplay-One The Club Open | Gyeonggi | 700,000,000 | (South Korea) Hur In-hoi (6) | 4.79 | | New tournament |
| 14 Jul | KPGA Gunsan CC Open | North Jeolla | 700,000,000 | (South Korea) Jang Yu-bin (2) | 4.42 | | |
| 1 Sep | Lexus Masters | South Gyeongsang | 1,000,000,000 | (South Korea) Lee Seung-taek (1) | 5.07 | | New tournament |
| 8 Sep | Shinhan Donghae Open | Gyeonggi | 1,400,000,000 | (Japan) Kensei Hirata (n/a) | 9.05 | ASA, JPN | |
| 15 Sep | Golfzon-Toray Open | North Gyeongsang | 1,000,000,000 | (South Korea) Ham Jeong-woo (4) | 4.66 | | |
| 6 Oct | Hyundai Insurance KJ Choi Invitational | Gyeonggi | 1,250,000,000 | (South Korea) Lee Soo-min (5) | 4.45 | | |
| 13 Oct | Baeksang Holdings-Asiad CC Busan Open | South Gyeongsang | 1,000,000,000 | (South Korea) Jang Yu-bin (3) | 4.33 | | |
| 20 Oct | The Charity Classic | Gyeonggi | 1,000,000,000 | (South Korea) Cho Woo-young (2) | 4.49 | | New tournament |
| 27 Oct | Genesis Championship | Gyeonggi | US$4,000,000 | (South Korea) An Byeong-hun (2) | 15.55 | EUR | |
| 3 Nov | Dong-A Membership Exchange Group Open | North Jeolla | 700,000,000 | (South Korea) Lee Dong-min (3) | 3.34 | | New tournament |
| 10 Nov | KPGA Tour Championship | Jeju | 1,100,000,000 | (South Korea) Lee Dai-han (1) | 4.68 | | |

== Order of Merit ==
The Order of Merit was titled as the Genesis Points and was based on tournament results during the season, calculated using a points-based system. The top three players on the Order of Merit earned status to play on the 2025 European Tour (DP World Tour).

| Position | Player | Points | Status earned |
|---|---|---|---|
| 1 | (South Korea) Jang Yu-bin | 8,002 | Forfeited exemption (Note: Jang initially chose to forfeit his exemption for the 2025 European Tour season to focus on PGA Tour Qualifying School. He later became ineligible for this due to joining LIV Golf in December 2024.) |
| 2 | (South Korea) Kim Min-kyu | 6,052 | Promoted to European Tour |
| 3 | (South Korea) Hur In-hoi | 4,995 | Promoted to European Tour |
| 4 | (South Korea) Lee Jung-hwan | 4,861 | Forfeited exemption |
| 5 | (South Korea) Cho Woo-young | 4,649 | Promoted to European Tour |

== Awards ==
| Award | Winner | Ref. |
|---|---|---|
| Player of the Year (Grand Prize Award) | (South Korea) Jang Yu-bin | |
| Rookie of the Year (Myeong-chul Award) | (South Korea) Song Min-hyuk | |
