= Mun Do-yeob =

South Korean golfer (born 1991)

Personal information
- Nationality: South Korea
- Born: 11 August 1991 (age 35) Seoul, South Korea
- Height: 1.75 m (5 ft 9 in)

Career
- Sport: Golf
- Turned professional: 2013
- Current tours: Asian Tour; Korean Tour
- Former tour: LIV Golf
- Professional wins: 6

Number of wins by tour
- Asian Tour: 1
- Other: 6

Best results in major championships
- Masters Tournament: DNP
- PGA Championship: DNP
- U.S. Open: DNP
- The Open Championship: CUT: 2019
Medal record
Men's golf
Representing South Korea
Asian Games
Silver medal – second place	2026 Aichi–Nagoya	Men's team

Mun Do-yeob (Korean: 문도엽; born 11 August 1991), also known as Doyeob Mun or Do Mun, is a South Korean professional golfer.

== Professional career ==
Mun turned professional in 2013 and joined the Korean Tour. In his rookie season he was runner-up at the SolaSeaDo-Pine Beach Open, a stroke behind Hong Soon-sang. In 2016, he was runner-up at the Hyundai Insurance KJ Choi Invitational, a stroke behind Joo Heung-chol. He won his maiden professional title at the 2018 KPGA Championship.

Mun also joined the Asian Tour in 2018. He tied for 5th at the 2019 SMBC Singapore Open, which earned him a start at the 2019 Open Championship at Royal Portrush, his first major.

In 2025, Mun won the GS Caltex Maekyung Open, after a bogey-free eight-under-par final round of 63.

In 2026, Mun lead the Korean Tour Order of Merit in May after winning the KPGA Gyeongbuk Open, and joined the Korean Golf Club on LIV Golf, replacing Danny Lee.

== Professional wins (6) ==
=== Asian Tour wins (1) ===
No.	Date	Tournament	Winning score	Margin of victory	Runners-up
1	4 May 2025	GS Caltex Maekyung Open^{1}	−10 (74-67-70-63=274)	3 strokes	(Thailand) Jazz Janewattananond, (South Korea) Kim Baek-jun, (South Korea) Lee Jung-hwan

^{1}Co-sanctioned by the Korean Tour

=== Korean Tour wins (6) ===
No.	Date	Tournament	Winning score	Margin of victory	Runner(s)-up
1	1 Jul 2018	KPGA Championship	−12 (63-65-71-69=268)	Playoff	(South Korea) Han Chang-won
2	18 Apr 2021	DB Insurance Promy Open	−11 (68-69-69-71=277)	3 strokes	(South Korea) Tom Kim
3	25 Sep 2022	DGB Financial Group Open	−11 (65-65-64-69=263)	Playoff	(South Korea) Kim Han-byeol
4	4 May 2025	GS Caltex Maekyung Open^{1}	−10 (74-67-70-63=274)	3 strokes	(Thailand) Jazz Janewattananond, (South Korea) Kim Baek-jun, (South Korea) Lee Jung-hwan
5	7 Sep 2025	KPGA Founders Cup	−26 (68-67-63-64=262)	4 strokes	(South Korea) Kim Chan-woo
6	17 May 2026	KPGA Gyeongbuk Open	−14 (67-69-67-67=270)	1 stroke	(South Korea) Moon Dong-hyun

^{1}Co-sanctioned by the Asian Tour

Korean Tour playoff record (2–0)

No.	Year	Tournament	Opponent	Result
1	2018	KPGA Championship	(South Korea) Han Chang-won	Won with birdie on second hole
2	2022	DGB Financial Group Open	(South Korea) Kim Han-byeol	Won with birdie on first hole

== Results in major championships ==
Tournament	2019
Masters Tournament	
PGA Championship	
U.S. Open	
The Open Championship	CUT

Did not play

CUT = missed the half-way cut
"T" = tied
