= 2022 Korean Tour =

Golf tour season

2022 Korean Tour season
- Duration: 14 April 2022 – 13 November 2022
- Number of official events: 21
- Most wins: (South Korea) Kim Bi-o (2) (South Korea) Kim Yeong-su (2) (South Korea) Park Eun-shin (2) (South Korea) Seo Yo-seop (2)
- Order of Merit: (South Korea) Kim Yeong-su
- Player of the Year: (South Korea) Kim Yeong-su
- Rookie of the Year: (South Korea) Bae Yong-jun

The 2022 Korean Tour was the 45th season on the Korean Tour, the main professional golf tour in South Korea since it was formed in 1978.

== European Tour partnership ==
In December, it was announced by the European Tour that the KPGA had extended their partnership with them and the PGA Tour. As part of the expansion, the leading player on the Korean Tour Order of Merit was given status onto the European Tour for the following season.

== Schedule ==
The following table lists official events during the 2022 season.

Date	Tournament	Location	Purse (₩)	Winner (Note: The number in brackets after each winner's name is the number of Korean Tour events they had won up to and including that tournament. This information is only shown for Korean Tour members.)	OWGR points	Other tours (Note: ASA − Asian Tour; JPN − Japan Golf Tour.)	Notes
17 Apr	DB Insurance Promy Open	Gangwon	700,000,000	(South Korea) Park Sang-hyun (11)	9		
8 May	GS Caltex Maekyung Open	Gyeonggi	1,200,000,000	(South Korea) Kim Bi-o (7)	12	ASA	
15 May	Woori Financial Group Championship	Gyeonggi	1,300,000,000	(South Korea) Chang Hee-min (1)	9		New tournament
22 May	Descente Korea Munsingwear Matchplay	South Gyeongsang	800,000,000	(South Korea) Park Eun-shin (1)	9		
29 May	KB Financial Liiv Championship	Gyeonggi	700,000,000	(South Korea) Yang Ji-ho (1)	9		
5 Jun	SK Telecom Open	Jeju	1,300,000,000	(South Korea) Kim Bi-o (8)	9		
12 Jun	KPGA Championship	South Gyeongsang	1,500,000,000	(South Korea) Shin Sang-hun (1)	9		
19 Jun	Hana Bank Invitational	Gangwon	1,000,000,000	(Australia) Jun Seok Lee (2)	9		
26 Jun	Kolon Korea Open	South Chungcheong	1,350,000,000	(South Korea) Kim Min-kyu (1)	12	ASA	
3 Jul	Asiad CC Busan Open	South Gyeongsang	1,000,000,000	(South Korea) Hwang Jung-gon (3)	9		New tournament
17 Jul	Honors K Sollago CC Open	South Chungcheong	500,000,000	(South Korea) Bae Yong-jun (1)	9		
14 Aug	Woosung Construction Open	South Gyeongsang	700,000,000	(Canada) Justin Shin (1)	3.23		
28 Aug	Bodyfriend Phantom Rovo Gunsan CC Open	North Jeolla	500,000,000	(South Korea) Seo Yo-seop (4)	3.72		
4 Sep	LX Championship	Gyeonggi	600,000,000	(South Korea) Seo Yo-seop (5)	3.55		New tournament
11 Sep	Shinhan Donghae Open	Japan	1,400,000,000	(Japan) Kazuki Higa (n/a)	9.03	ASA, JPN	
18 Sep	Bizplay Electronic Times Open	Jeju	700,000,000	(South Korea) Choi Jin-ho (8)	3.41		
25 Sep	DGB Financial Group Open	North Gyeongsang	500,000,000	(South Korea) Mun Do-yeob (3)	3.32		
2 Oct	Hyundai Insurance KJ Choi Invitational	Gyeonggi	1,250,000,000	(South Korea) Lee Hyung-joon (6)	4.07		
9 Oct	Genesis Championship	Gyeonggi	1,500,000,000	(South Korea) Kim Yeong-su (1)	4.39		
6 Nov	Golfzon-Toray Open	North Gyeongsang	700,000,000	(South Korea) Park Eun-shin (2)	2.97		New tournament
13 Nov	LG Signature Players Championship	Gyeonggi	1,300,000,000	(South Korea) Kim Yeong-su (2)	2.83		

== Order of Merit ==
The Order of Merit was titled as the Genesis Points and was based on tournament results during the season, calculated using a points-based system. The leading player on the Order of Merit earned status to play on the 2023 European Tour (DP World Tour).

Position	Player	Points	Status earned
1	(South Korea) Kim Yeong-su	5,915	Promoted to European Tour
2	(South Korea) Seo Yo-seop	5,162	
3	(South Korea) Kim Bi-o	4,760	
4	(South Korea) Ham Jeong-woo	4,632	
5	(South Korea) Bae Yong-jun	4,454	

== Awards ==
Award	Winner	Ref.
Player of the Year (Grand Prize Award)	(South Korea) Kim Yeong-su	
Rookie of the Year (Myeong-chul Award)	(South Korea) Bae Yong-jun	
