= 2023 Korean Tour =

Golf tour season

2023 Korean Tour season
- Duration: 13 April 2023 – 12 November 2023
- Number of official events: 22
- Most wins: (South Korea) Koh Gun-taek (3)
- Order of Merit: (South Korea) Ham Jeong-woo
- Player of the Year: (South Korea) Ham Jeong-woo
- Rookie of the Year: (South Korea) Park Sung-joon

The 2023 Korean Tour was the 46th season on the Korean Tour, the main professional golf tour in South Korea since it was formed in 1978.

== European Tour strategic alliance extension ==
Following the strategic alliance partnership signed with the European Tour in December 2022, the season marked the inaugural edition of the Korea Championship, the first time the Korean Tour had co-sanctioned an event with the European Tour since 2013. Following the conclusion of the event, a new extension to the strategic alliance was announced in May by the European Tour. As part of the extension, an additional two players (three in total) from the Korean Tour Order of Merit were awarded European Tour (DP World Tour) status for the following season.

== Schedule ==
The following table lists official events during the 2023 season.

| Date | Tournament | Location | Purse (₩) | Winner (Note: The number in brackets after each winner's name is the number of Korean Tour events they had won up to and including that tournament. This information is only shown for Korean Tour members.) | OWGR points | Other tours (Note: ASA − Asian Tour; EUR − European Tour; JPN − Japan Golf Tour.) | Notes |
|---|---|---|---|---|---|---|---|
| 16 Apr | DB Insurance Promy Open | Gangwon | 700,000,000 | (South Korea) Koh Gun-taek (1) | 3.18 | | |
| 23 Apr | Golfzon Open in Jeju | Jeju | 700,000,000 | (South Korea) Cho Woo-young (a) (1) | 3.57 | | New tournament |
| 30 Apr | Korea Championship | Gyeonggi | US$2,000,000 | (Spain) Pablo Larrazábal (n/a) | 17.05 | EUR | New tournament |
| 7 May | GS Caltex Maekyung Open | Jeju | 1,300,000,000 | (South Korea) Jung Chan-min (1) | 6.29 | ASA | |
| 14 May | Woori Financial Group Championship | Gyeonggi | 1,500,000,000 | (South Korea) Im Sung-jae (2) | 5.56 | | |
| 21 May | SK Telecom Open | Jeju | 1,300,000,000 | (South Korea) Baek Seuk-hyun (1) | 4.17 | | |
| 28 May | KB Financial Liiv Championship | Gyeonggi | 700,000,000 | (South Korea) Kim Dong-min (1) | 3.58 | | |
| 4 Jun | Descente Korea Munsingwear Matchplay | North Chungcheong | 800,000,000 | (South Korea) Lee Jae-kyeong (3) | 3.54 | | |
| 11 Jun | KPGA Championship | South Gyeongsang | 1,500,000,000 | (South Korea) Choi Seung-bin (1) | 4.19 | | |
| 18 Jun | Hana Bank Invitational | Japan | ¥100,000,000 | (South Korea) Yang Ji-ho (2) | 7.33 | JPN | |
| 25 Jun | Kolon Korea Open | South Chungcheong | 1,350,000,000 | (United States) Seungsu Han (2) | 6.43 | ASA | |
| 23 Jul | Honors K Sollago CC Han Jangsang Invitational | South Chungcheong | 500,000,000 | (South Korea) Koh Gun-taek (2) | 3.63 | | |
| 27 Aug | KPGA Gunsan CC Open | North Jeolla | 500,000,000 | (South Korea) Jang Yu-bin (a) (1) | 3.66 | | |
| 3 Sep | LX Championship | Gyeonggi | 600,000,000 | (South Korea) Kim Bi-o (9) | 3.78 | | |
| 10 Sep | Shinhan Donghae Open | Gyeonggi | 1,400,000,000 | (South Korea) Koh Gun-taek (3) | 8.52 | ASA, JPN | |
| 17 Sep | Bizplay Electronic Times Open | Gyeonggi | 700,000,000 | (South Korea) Kim Chan-woo (1) | 2.91 | | |
| 24 Sep | iMBank Open | South Gyeongsang | 500,000,000 | (South Korea) Hur In-hoi (5) | 3.27 | | |
| 8 Oct | Hyundai Insurance KJ Choi Invitational | Gyeonggi | 1,250,000,000 | (South Korea) Ham Jeong-woo (3) | 3.37 | | |
| 15 Oct | Genesis Championship | Gyeonggi | 1,500,000,000 | (South Korea) Park Sang-hyun (12) | 5.62 | | |
| 29 Oct | Baeksang Holdings-Asiad CC Busan Open | South Gyeongsang | 1,000,000,000 | (South Korea) Eom Jae-woong (2) | 4.80 | | |
| 5 Nov | Golfzon-Toray Open | North Gyeongsang | 700,000,000 | (South Korea) Jung Chan-min (2) | 3.64 | | |
| 12 Nov | LG Signature Players Championship | Gyeonggi | 1,300,000,000 | (South Korea) Shin Sang-hun (2) | 2.86 | | |

== Order of Merit ==
The Order of Merit was titled as the Genesis Points and was based on tournament results during the season, calculated using a points-based system. The top three players on the Order of Merit earned status to play on the 2024 European Tour (DP World Tour).

| Position | Player | Points | Status earned |
|---|---|---|---|
| 1 | (South Korea) Ham Jeong-woo | 6,062 | Promoted to European Tour |
| 2 | (South Korea) Lee Jung-hwan | 5,205 | Promoted to European Tour |
| 3 | (South Korea) Park Sang-hyun | 5,136 | Promoted to European Tour |
| 4 | (South Korea) Koh Gun-taek | 5,108 | |
| 5 | (South Korea) Kang Kyung-nam | 5,004 | |

== Awards ==
| Award | Winner | Ref. |
|---|---|---|
| Player of the Year (Grand Prize Award) | (South Korea) Ham Jeong-woo | |
| Rookie of the Year (Myeong-chul Award) | (South Korea) Park Sung-joon | |
