= KPGA Tour Championship =

Tournament information
- Location: Seogwipo, South Korea
- Established: 2005
- Courses: Teddy Valley Golf & Resort
- Par: 72
- Length: 7,259 yards (6,638 m)
- Tour: Korean Tour
- Format: Stroke play
- Prize fund: ₩1,100,000,000
- Month played: November

Tournament record score
- Aggregate: 262 Lee Hyung-joon (2016)
- To par: −26 as above

Current champion
- (South Korea) Jung Jae-hyun

Location map
- Location in South Korea

The KPGA Tour Championship is a professional golf tournament on the Korean Tour. It has generally been played in November, one of the last events of the season. The 2018 event was played at Lake Hills Golf Club in Anseong, South Korea.

== Winners ==
Year	Winner	Score	To par	Margin of victory	Runner(s)-up	Venue
KPGA Tour Championship
2026	(South Korea) Jung Jae-hyun	275	−13	3 strokes	(South Korea) Hwang Jae-min	Teddy Valley
2025	(South Korea) Park Sang-hyun	277	−11	1 stroke	(South Korea) Lee Tae-hee	Teddy Valley
2024	(South Korea) Lee Dai-han	266	−18	3 strokes	(South Korea) Jang Yu-bin (South Korea) Song Min-hyuk	Cypress
2019–2023: No tournament
Golfzon-DYB Education KPGA Tour Championship
2018	(South Korea) Lee Jung-hwan	274	−6	1 stroke	(South Korea) Jung Ji-ho (South Korea) Lee Sung-ho	Lake Hills
Caido Tour Championship
2017	(South Korea) Choi Go-woong	269	−11	2 strokes	(South Korea) Choi Min-chel (South Korea) Lee Seung-taek	Solmoro
Caido Korea Tour Championship
2016	(South Korea) Lee Hyung-joon	262	−26	5 strokes	(South Korea) Lee Chang-woo	Bosung
Caido Golf LIS Tour Championship
2015	(South Korea) Kim Tae-hoon	203 (Note: Shortened to 54 holes due to weather.)	−13	1 stroke	(South Korea) Park Jun-won	The Links
Herald KYJ Tour Championship
2014	(South Korea) Lee Hyung-joon	210	−6	3 strokes	(South Korea) Hong Soon-sang	Skyhill
2013	(South Korea) Hur In-hoi	276	−12	4 strokes	(South Korea) Choi Joon-woo (South Korea) Kim Gi-whan (South Korea) Kim Hyung-tae	Skyhill
2011–12: No tournament
Hana Tour Championship
2010	(South Korea) Kim Wi-joong	280	−8	Playoff	(South Korea) Son Joon-eob	Birch Hill
2009: No tournament
SBS Hana Tour Championship
2008	(South Korea) Choi Ho-sung	282	−6	Playoff	(South Korea) Kim Dae-hyun	Welli Hilli
2007	(South Korea) Kang Kyung-nam	270	−18	1 stroke	(South Korea) Kim Hyung-tae (South Korea) Shin Yong-jin	Yongwon
2006	(South Korea) Kim Hyung-tae	279	−9	5 strokes	(South Korea) Kim Chang-yoon	Montvert
Bando Bora CC Tour Championship
2005	(South Korea) Yoo Jong-koo	279	−14	2 strokes	(South Korea) Kang Ji-man	Bora
