= 2016 Korean Tour =

Golf tour season

2016 Korean Tour season
- Duration: 21 April 2016 – 13 November 2016
- Number of official events: 13
- Most wins: (South Korea) Choi Jin-ho (2) (South Korea) Joo Heung-chol (2)
- Order of Merit: (South Korea) Choi Jin-ho
- Player of the Year: (South Korea) Choi Jin-ho
- Rookie of the Year: (South Korea) Kim Tae-woo

The 2016 Korean Tour was the 39th season on the Korean Tour, the main professional golf tour in South Korea since it was formed in 1978.

== OWGR points increase ==
In April, the Official World Golf Ranking announced that the minimum points awarded to Korean Tour events would be increased from 6 points to 9.

== Schedule ==
The following table lists official events during the 2016 season.

Date	Tournament	Location	Purse (₩)	Winner (Note: The number in brackets after each winner's name is the number of Korean Tour events they had won up to and including that tournament. This information is only shown for Korean Tour members.)	OWGR points	Other tours (Note: ASA − Asian Tour; ONE − OneAsia Tour.)	Notes
24 Apr	Dongbu Insurance Promy Open	Gyeonggi	500,000,000	(South Korea) Choi Jin-ho (5)	9		
8 May	GS Caltex Maekyung Open	Gyeonggi	1,000,000,000	(South Korea) Park Sang-hyun (5)	11	ONE	
15 May	Maeil Dairies Open	South Chungcheong	300,000,000	(South Korea) Mo Joong-kyung (5)	9		
22 May	SK Telecom Open	Gyeonggi	1,000,000,000	(South Korea) Lee Sang-hee (3)	10		
29 May	Nefs Heritage	Gangwon	702,339,000	(South Korea) Choi Jin-ho (6)	9		
12 Jun	Descente Korea Munsingwear Matchplay	South Gyeongsang	800,000,000	(South Korea) Lee Sang-yeop (1)	9		
28 Aug	KPGA Championship	South Gyeongsang	1,000,000,000	(South Korea) Kim Jun-sung (1)	9		
4 Sep	NS HomeShopping Gunsan CC Jeonbuk Open	North Jeolla	500,000,000	(South Korea) Joo Heung-chol (2)	9		
11 Sep	Kolon Korea Open	South Chungcheong	1,200,000,000	(South Korea) Lee Kyoung-hoon (2)	8	ONE	
2 Oct	Shinhan Donghae Open	Gyeonggi	1,200,000,000	(India) Gaganjeet Bhullar (n/a)	18	ASA	
9 Oct	Hyundai Insurance KJ Choi Invitational	South Gyeongsang	500,000,000	(South Korea) Joo Heung-chol (3)	9		
23 Oct	DGB Financial Group Daegu Gyeongbuk Open	North Gyeongsang	500,000,000	(South Korea) Yoon Jung-ho (1)	9		New tournament
13 Nov	Caido Korea Tour Championship	South Jeolla	300,000,000	(South Korea) Lee Hyung-joon (3)	9		

== Order of Merit ==
The Order of Merit was titled as the Genesis Points and was based on tournament results during the season, calculated using a points-based system.

Position	Player	Points
1	(South Korea) Choi Jin-ho	4,009
2	(South Korea) Lee Chang-woo	3,762
3	(South Korea) Lee Hyung-joon	3,215
4	(South Korea) Joo Heung-chol	3,179
5	(South Korea) Yoon Jung-ho	2,897

== Awards ==
Award	Winner	Ref.
Player of the Year (Grand Prize Award)	(South Korea) Choi Jin-ho	
Rookie of the Year (Myeong-chul Award)	(South Korea) Kim Tae-woo	
