= Descente Korea Munsingwear Matchplay =

South Korean professional golf tournament

Tournament information
- Location: North Chungcheong, South Korea
- Established: 2010
- Course: Kingsdale Golf Club
- Par: 72
- Length: 7,256 yards (6,635 m)
- Tour: Korean Tour
- Format: Match play
- Prize fund: ₩800,000,000
- Month played: June

Tournament record score
- Score: 7 and 5 Lee Jae-kyeong (2023)

Current champion
- (South Korea) Kim Min-kyu

Final champion
- Location in South Korea

The Descente Korea Munsingwear Matchplay is an annual professional golf tournament hosted in South Korea and sponsored by the clothing company Munsingwear. The tournament has been held since 2010 and is part of the Korean Tour for men. Prize money was ₩400,000,000 in 2010 and 2011, ₩600,000,000 in 2012 and 2013, ₩800,000,000 from 2014 to 2016 and ₩1,000,000,000 in 2017 to 2019. The event was not held in 2020 but returned in 2021 with reduced prize money of ₩800,000,000.

From 2010 to 2013 and in 2015 the event was played towards the end of season, in September or October. In 2014 it was played in May while from 2016 to 2019 it was played in June.

Originally 64 players qualified to play 6 rounds of 18-hole match-play over 3 days. In 2015 the event was extended to four days with just one round on the first two days. In 2016 the format was revised. At the last-16 stage the players are divided into four groups of four, each playing the other three in the group. Extra holes are not played in the group stage. This stage takes place on the third day and the morning of the final day. The two best group winners then play on the final afternoon to decide the winner of the event, with the other two group winners playing to decide 3rd and 4th places, the two best group runners-up play for 5th/6th places, etc. Originally there were matches for all players who reached the last-16 but later only the top 10 played on the final afternoon. Rankings within groups and then between groups are determined firstly by the number of wins and halved matches, and then by the net number of holes up in the three matches. For example, in 2016 Lee Sang-yeop reached the final as the second ranked player, with 3 wins and +8 holes (1up, 6&4, 1up) while Park Sang-hyun with 3 wins and +7 holes (1up, 4&3, 2&1) played in the match to decide 3rd/4th places.

== Winners ==
Year	Winner	Score	Runner-up	Venue
Descente Korea Munsingwear Matchplay
2024	(South Korea) Kim Min-kyu	20 holes	(South Korea) Cho Woo-young	Kingsdale
2023	(South Korea) Lee Jae-kyeong	7 and 5	(South Korea) Bae Yong-jun	Kingsdale
2022	(South Korea) Park Eun-shin	20 holes	(South Korea) Kim Min-jun	DeBeach
2021	(South Korea) Lee Dong-min	1 up	(Canada) Richard T. Lee	DeBeach
2020	Cancelled due to the COVID-19 pandemic			
2019	(South Korea) Lee Hyung-joon	21 holes	(South Korea) Seo Yo-seop	South Cape Owners
2018	(South Korea) Kim Meen-whee	1 up	(South Korea) Hyun Jeong-hyeob	South Cape Owners
2017	(South Korea) Kim Seung-hyuk	19 holes	(South Korea) Lee Jung-hwan	South Cape Owners
2016	(South Korea) Lee Sang-yeop	1 up	(South Korea) Hwang Inn-choon	88 CC
Descente Korea Munsingwear Matchplay Championship
2015	(South Korea) Lee Hyung-joon	2 and 1	(South Korea) Joo Heung-chol	88 CC
2014	(South Korea) Lee Ki-sang	2 and 1	(South Korea) Choi Joon-woo	88 CC
Munsingwear Matchplay Championship
2013	(South Korea) Kim Do-hoon	19 holes	(South Korea) Song Young-han	Maestro
2012	(South Korea) Kim Dae-hyun	2 and 1	(South Korea) Hong Soon-sang	Alpensia Troon
Munsingwear Championship
2011	(South Korea) Hong Soon-sang	4 and 3	(South Korea) Park Do-kyu	Castle Pine
2010	(South Korea) Kang Kyung-nam	2 and 1	(South Korea) Park No-seok	Evendale
