= Kim Bi-o =

South Korean golfer (born 1990)

Personal information
- Nationality: South Korea
- Born: 21 August 1990 (age 36) Seoul, South Korea
- Height: 6 ft 0 in (1.83 m)
- Weight: 178 lb (81 kg; 12.7 st)

Career
- Sport: Golf
- College: Yonsei University
- Turned professional: 2009
- Current tours: Asian Tour; Korean Tour
- Former tours: PGA Tour; Web.com Tour; OneAsia Tour
- Professional wins: 10
- Highest ranking: 99 (12 June 2022) (as of 25 October 2026)

Number of wins by tour
- Asian Tour: 1
- Other: 9

Best results in major championships
- Masters Tournament: DNP
- PGA Championship: CUT: 2022
- U.S. Open: T45: 2013
- The Open Championship: CUT: 2023

Achievements and awards
- Korean Tour Order of Merit winner: 2010
- Korean Tour Player of the Year: 2010
- Korean Tour Rookie of the Year: 2010
- OneAsia Tour Order of Merit winner: 2012
- Asian Tour Rookie of the Year: 2022

Kim Bi-o (Korean: 김비오; born 21 August 1990) is a South Korean professional golfer who played on the PGA Tour.

== Amateur career ==
As an amateur, Kim won the Korean Amateur Open and Japan Amateur Golf Championship in 2008. He also represented Asia/Pacific in the 2008 Bonallack Trophy and South Korea in the 2008 Eisenhower Trophy.

== Professional career ==
Kim turned professional in 2009 and joined his home Korean Tour for 2010, winning the Johnnie Walker Open by 6 strokes.

At the end of the 2010 season, he entered qualifying school for the PGA Tour and gained his playing rights in eleventh place. He lost his PGA Tour card after finishing 162nd on the money list. He split his 2012 season between the OneAsia Tour and Web.com Tour. Kim won for the second time as a professional in 2011 at the Nanshan China Masters on the OneAsia Tour. He picked up his third victory at the GS Caltex Maekyung Open on the OneAsia Tour in May 2012. Along with his two victories on the OneAsia Tour in 2012, Kim won the tour's Order of Merit. With his two victories he was the leading money winner on the Korean Tour in 2012 even though he only played three events. Kim's highest World Ranking was 200th, in May 2012.

In 2013, he played on the Web.com Tour for a second season, but made only two cuts in 15 tournaments.

From 2014, he has played mainly on the Korean Tour. From 2014 to 2018 he had little success and had long spells outside the top 1000 in the world rankings. During this period his best finishes were to be fourth in the 2015 Gunsan CC Open and the 2017 DGB Financial Group Daegu Gyeongbuk Open

Kim showed a return to form in 2019. He won the NS HomeShopping Gunsan CC Jeonbuk Open, the second event of the 2019 Korean Tour season, his first win since 2012. In late September he had his second win of the season, the DGB Financial Group Volvik Daegu Gyeongbuk Open.

On 1 October 2019, the Korean Professional Golfers Association announced that Kim has been suspended for three years after making an obscene gesture during the final round of the DGB Financial Group Volvik Daegu Gyeongbuk Open, which Kim won. On the 16th hole, after a cellphone camera shutter went off during his downswing, Kim turned and flipped off the crowd, before slamming his club into the ground. Kim apologized for the gesture and decided not to appeal the suspension. His suspension was reduced to one year on 24 October, but the 10 million won fine and 120 hours of community service remained.

== Amateur wins ==
- 2008 Korean Amateur Open, Japan Amateur Golf Championship

== Professional wins (10) ==
=== Asian Tour wins (1) ===
No.	Date	Tournament	Winning score	Margin of victory	Runner-up
1	8 May 2022	GS Caltex Maekyung Open^{1}	−9 (67-68-68-72=275)	2 strokes	(South Korea) Cho Min-gyu

^{1}Co-sanctioned by the Korean Tour

=== OneAsia Tour wins (3) ===
No.	Date	Tournament	Winning score	Margin of victory	Runner(s)-up
1	5 Jun 2011	Nanshan China Masters	−10 (74-67-71-66=278)	Playoff	(Australia) Craig Hancock, (Australia) Scott Laycock, (New Zealand) Michael Long
2	13 May 2012	GS Caltex Maekyung Open^{1}	−15 (69-69-67-68=273)	5 strokes	(South Korea) Ryu Hyun-woo
3	20 May 2012	SK Telecom Open^{1}	−18 (68-68-67-67=270)	3 strokes	(South Korea) Park Sang-hyun

^{1}Co-sanctioned by the Korean Tour

OneAsia Tour playoff record (1–0)

No.	Year	Tournament	Opponents	Result
1	2011	Nanshan China Masters	(Australia) Craig Hancock, (Australia) Scott Laycock, (New Zealand) Michael Long	Won with birdie on third extra hole Hancock eliminated by par on second hole Laycock eliminated by par on first hole

=== Korean Tour wins (9) ===
No.	Date	Tournament	Winning score	Margin of victory	Runner(s)-up
1	8 Aug 2010	Johnnie Walker Open	−20 (68-65-68-67=268)	6 strokes	(South Korea) Lee Min-chang, (South Korea) Park Do-kyu, (South Korea) Yoon Jung-ho (a)
2	13 May 2012	GS Caltex Maekyung Open^{1}	−15 (69-69-67-68=273)	5 strokes	(South Korea) Ryu Hyun-woo
3	20 May 2012	SK Telecom Open^{1}	−18 (68-68-67-67=270)	3 strokes	(South Korea) Park Sang-hyun
4	28 Apr 2019	NS HomeShopping Gunsan CC Jeonbuk Open	−7 (68-70-72-67=277)	2 strokes	(South Korea) Kim Tae-hoon
5	29 Sep 2019	DGB Financial Group Volvik Daegu Gyeongbuk Open	−17 (69-67-67-68=271)	1 stroke	(South Korea) Kim Dae-hyun
6	7 Nov 2021	LG Signature Players Championship	−23 (71-65-66-63=265)	6 strokes	(South Korea) Tom Kim
7	8 May 2022	GS Caltex Maekyung Open^{2} (2)	−9 (67-68-68-72=275)	2 strokes	(South Korea) Cho Min-gyu
8	5 Jun 2022	SK Telecom Open (2)	−19 (69-66-67-63=265)	7 strokes	(South Korea) Gang Yun-seok
9	3 Sep 2023	LX Championship	−21 (65-68-67-67=267)	Playoff	(South Korea) Hwang Jung-gon

^{1}Co-sanctioned by the OneAsia Tour
^{2}Co-sanctioned by the Asian Tour

Korean Tour playoff record (1–0)

No.	Year	Tournament	Opponent	Result
1	2023	LX Championship	(South Korea) Hwang Jung-gon	Won with par on second extra hole

== Results in major championships ==
Tournament	2013	2014	2015	2016	2017	2018
U.S. Open	T45					
The Open Championship						
PGA Championship						

Tournament	2019	2020	2021	2022	2023
PGA Championship				CUT	
U.S. Open					
The Open Championship		NT			CUT

T = Tied
CUT = missed the halfway cut
NT = No tournament due to the COVID-19 pandemic
Note: Kim never played in the Masters Tournament.

== Team appearances ==
Amateur

- Eisenhower Trophy (representing South Korea): 2008
- Bonallack Trophy (representing Asia/Pacific): 2008

== See also ==
- 2010 PGA Tour Qualifying School graduates
