= Genesis Championship =

South Korean men's golf tournament

Tournament information
- Location: Cheonan, South Korea
- Established: 2017
- Course: Woo Jeong Hills Country Club
- Par: 71
- Length: 7,367 yards (6,736 m)
- Tours: European Tour; Korean Tour
- Format: Stroke play
- Prize fund: US$4,000,000
- Month played: October

Tournament record score
- Aggregate: 270 Kim Seung-hyuk (2017)
- To par: −18 as above

Current champion
- (Japan) Yuto Katsuragawa

Location map
- Location in South Korea

The Genesis Championship is a men's professional golf tournament in South Korea. The inaugural event was held at the Jack Nicklaus Golf Club Korea from 21 to 24 September 2017. Prize money was KRW1,500,000,000, the largest for any Korean Tour event. The winner received KRW300,000,000 and an automatic entry to the CJ Cup and Genesis Open on the PGA Tour. The 2018 event was held in May while in 2019 and 2020 it was held in October.

The tournament is sponsored by Genesis Motors, the luxury vehicle division of Hyundai Motor Group.

In 2024, the tournament joined the European Tour schedule, becoming a co-sanctioned event.

== Winners ==
Year	Tour(s) (Note: EUR − European Tour; KOR − Korean Tour.)	Winner	Score	To par	Margin of victory	Runner(s)-up	Venue
2026	EUR, KOR	(Japan) Yuto Katsuragawa	271	−13	2 strokes	(France) Martin Couvra (France) Frédéric Lacroix	Woo Jeong Hills
2025	EUR, KOR	(South Korea) Lee Jung-hwan	273	−11	3 strokes	(England) Laurie Canter (Spain) Nacho Elvira	Woo Jeong Hills
2024	EUR, KOR	(South Korea) An Byeong-hun	271	−17	Playoff	(South Korea) Tom Kim	Jack Nicklaus
2023	KOR	(South Korea) Park Sang-hyun	271	−17	Playoff	(South Korea) Bae Yong-jun (South Korea) Im Sung-jae	Jack Nicklaus
2022	KOR	(South Korea) Kim Yeong-su	282	−6	1 stroke	(South Korea) Ham Jeong-woo	Jack Nicklaus
2021	KOR	(South Korea) Lee Jae-kyeong	274	−14	2 strokes	(South Korea) Shin Sang-hun	Jack Nicklaus
2020	KOR	(South Korea) Kim Tae-hoon	282	−6	2 strokes	(South Korea) Lee Jae-kyeong	Jack Nicklaus
2019	KOR	(South Korea) Im Sung-jae	282	−6	2 strokes	(South Korea) Kwon Sung-yeol (South Korea) Moon Kyong-jun	Jack Nicklaus
2018	KOR	(South Korea) Lee Tae-hee	281	−7	2 strokes	(South Korea) Lee Jung-hwan	Jack Nicklaus
2017	KOR	(South Korea) Kim Seung-hyuk	270	−18	8 strokes	(South Korea) Cho Min-gyu (United States) Seungsu Han (South Korea) Kang Kyung-nam	Jack Nicklaus
