= Park Jae-bum (golfer) =

South Korean professional golfer (born 1982)

Personal information
- Nationality: South Korea
- Born: 28 February 1982 (age 44)
- Height: 1.70 m (5 ft 7 in)
- Weight: 68 kg (150 lb; 10.7 st)

Career
- Sport: Golf
- Turned professional: 1999
- Current tour: Japan Golf Tour
- Professional wins: 2

Number of wins by tour
- Japan Golf Tour: 1
- Other: 1

Best results in major championships
- Masters Tournament: DNP
- PGA Championship: DNP
- U.S. Open: T59: 2012
- The Open Championship: CUT: 2010

Achievements and awards
- Japan Golf Tour Rookie of the Year: 2011

Park Jae-bum (Korean: 박재범; born 23 February 1982) is a South Korean professional golfer.

== Career ==
Park has played on the Japan Golf Tour since 2010. He won his first title at the 2011 Japan Golf Tour Championship Citibank Cup Shishido Hills.

== Professional wins (2) ==
=== Japan Golf Tour wins (1) ===
Legend
Japan majors (1)
Other Japan Golf Tour (0)

No.	Date	Tournament	Winning score	Margin of victory	Runner-up
1	5 Jun 2011	Japan Golf Tour Championship Citibank Cup Shishido Hills	−6 (77-68-65-68=278)	1 stroke	(Japan) Daisuke Maruyama

=== Korean Tour wins (1) ===
No.	Date	Tournament	Winning score	Margin of victory	Runner-up
1	21 Jun 2015	Vainer Open	−13 (65-71-70-69=275)	Playoff	(South Korea) Bae Yoon-ho

Korean Tour playoff record (1–0)

No.	Year	Tournament	Opponent	Result
1	2015	Vainer Open	(South Korea) Bae Yoon-ho	Won with birdie on first extra hole

== Results in major championships ==
Tournament	2010	2011	2012
U.S. Open			T59
The Open Championship	CUT		

Did not play

CUT = missed the halfway cut
"T" indicates a tie for a place
Note: Park never played in the Masters Tournament or the PGA Championship.

== Results in World Golf Championships ==
Tournament	2011
Match Play	
Championship	
Invitational	73
Champions	

Did not play
