= Park Sang-hyun (golfer) =

South Korean golfer

Personal information
- Nationality: South Korea
- Born: 24 April 1983 (age 43)
- Height: 171 cm (5 ft 7 in)
- Weight: 71 kg (157 lb; 11.2 st)

Career
- Sport: Golf
- Turned professional: 2005
- Current tour: Korean Tour
- Former tours: European Tour; Japan Golf Tour; Asian Tour
- Professional wins: 16

Number of wins by tour
- Japan Golf Tour: 2
- Asian Tour: 2
- Other: 12

Best results in major championships
- Masters Tournament: DNP
- PGA Championship: DNP
- U.S. Open: DNP
- The Open Championship: T16: 2019

Achievements and awards
- Asian Tour Rookie of the Year: 2018

Park Sang-hyun (Korean: 박상현; born 24 April 1983) is a South Korean professional golfer. Since 2014 Park has played primarily on the Japan Golf Tour, where he has two wins, in 2016 and 2019.

Before 2014 Park played on the Korean Tour, his first wins coming in 2009. He finished third behind Lee Westwood and Miguel Ángel Jiménez in the 2011 Ballantine's Championship, an event co-sanctioned with the European Tour and the Asian Tour. Park continues to play on the Korean Tour, where he has won a total of 11 times, including the GS Caltex Maekyung Open in 2016 and 2018. He finished runner-up in the 2018 Kolon Korean Open, one of the Open Qualifying Series events, to gain entry to the 2018 Open Championship, his first major championship. Park was runner-up in the 2018 Asian Tour Order of Merit giving him a place in the 2019 WGC-Mexico Championship.

== Professional wins (16) ==
=== Japan Golf Tour wins (2) ===
Legend
Japan majors (1)
Other Japan Golf Tour (1)

No.	Date	Tournament	Winning score	Margin of victory	Runners-up
1	4 Dec 2016	Golf Nippon Series JT Cup	−13 (66-65-71-65=267)	1 stroke	(Japan) Yuta Ikeda, (South Korea) Kim Kyung-tae, (Japan) Satoshi Kodaira
2	8 Sep 2019	Fujisankei Classic	−15 (68-69-67-65=269)	2 strokes	(South Korea) Choi Ho-sung, (Japan) Hiroshi Iwata

Japan Golf Tour playoff record (0–2)

No.	Year	Tournament	Opponent	Result
1	2014	Tsuruya Open	(Japan) Hiroyuki Fujita	Lost to par on first extra hole
2	2022	Fujisankei Classic	(Japan) Kaito Onishi	Lost to birdie on first extra hole

=== Asian Tour wins (2) ===
No.	Date	Tournament	Winning score	Margin of victory	Runner(s)-up
1	6 May 2018	GS Caltex Maekyung Open^{1}	−1 (71-70-71-71=283)	Playoff	(India) Gaganjeet Bhullar, (South Korea) Chang Yi-keun, (South Korea) Hwang Jung-gon
2	16 Sep 2018	Shinhan Donghae Open^{1}	−22 (65-68-66-63=262)	5 strokes	(Zimbabwe) Scott Vincent

^{1}Co-sanctioned by the Korean Tour

Asian Tour playoff record (1–0)

No.	Year	Tournament	Opponents	Result
1	2018	GS Caltex Maekyung Open	(India) Gaganjeet Bhullar, (South Korea) Chang Yi-keun, (South Korea) Hwang Jung-gon	Won with par on third extra hole Hwang eliminated by birdie on second hole Bhullar eliminated by par on first hole

=== OneAsia Tour wins (1) ===
No.	Date	Tournament	Winning score	Margin of victory	Runner-up
1	8 May 2016	GS Caltex Maekyung Open^{1}	−8 (67-70-75-68=280)	Playoff	(South Korea) Lee Soo-min

^{1}Co-sanctioned by the Korean Tour

OneAsia Tour playoff record (1–0)

No.	Year	Tournament	Opponent	Result
1	2016	GS Caltex Maekyung Open	(South Korea) Lee Soo-min	Won with par on second extra hole

=== Korean Tour wins (14) ===
No.	Date	Tournament	Winning score	Margin of victory	Runner(s)-up
1	24 May 2009	SK Telecom Open	−12 (69-68-70-69=276)	1 stroke	(South Korea) Kim Do-hoon
2	25 Oct 2009	SBS Emerson Pacific Hilton Namhae Open	−15 (68-67-67-71=273)	1 stroke	(South Korea) Bae Sang-moon
3	24 Aug 2014	Vainer Pineridge Open	−15 (67-71-64-67=269)	1 stroke	(South Korea) Maeng Dong-seop
4	12 Oct 2014	KJ Choi Invitational	−21 (65-68-68-66=267)	2 strokes	(South Korea) Kim Tae-hoon
5	8 May 2016	GS Caltex Maekyung Open^{1}	−8 (67-70-75-68=280)	Playoff	(South Korea) Lee Soo-min
6	6 May 2018	GS Caltex Maekyung Open^{2} (2)	−1 (71-70-71-71=283)	Playoff	(India) Gaganjeet Bhullar, (South Korea) Chang Yi-keun, (South Korea) Hwang Jung-gon
7	17 Jun 2018	KEB Hana Bank Invitational	−21 (68-64-68-67=267)	1 stroke	(South Korea) Lee Sung-ho
8	16 Sep 2018	Shinhan Donghae Open^{2}	−22 (65-68-66-63=262)	5 strokes	(Zimbabwe) Scott Vincent
9	11 Jul 2021	Woosung Construction Aramir CC Busan Gyeongnam Open	−18 (69-64-66-67=266)	2 strokes	(South Korea) Chun Jae-han
10	19 Sep 2021	DGB Financial Group Irvine Open	−23 (67-65-65-64=261)	2 strokes	(South Korea) Kim Han-byeol
11	17 Apr 2022	DB Insurance Promy Open	−10 (65-70-72-67=274)	1 stroke	(South Korea) Cho Sung-min, (South Korea) Lee Hyung-joon, (Australia) Jun Seok Lee
12	15 Oct 2023	Genesis Championship	−17 (67-68-68-68=271)	Playoff	(South Korea) Bae Yong-jun, (South Korea) Im Sung-jae
13	31 Aug 2025	Dong-A Membership Exchange Group Open	−21 (64-63-64-68=259)	2 strokes	(Canada) Richard T. Lee
14	9 Nov 2025	KPGA Tour Championship	−11 (66-69-71-71=277)	1 stroke	(South Korea) Lee Tae-hee

^{1}Co-sanctioned by the OneAsia Tour
^{2}Co-sanctioned by the Asian Tour

Korean Tour playoff record (3–3)

No.	Year	Tournament	Opponent(s)	Result
1	2008	NH NongHyup KPGA Championship	(Australia) Andrew McKenzie, (South Korea) Suk Jong-yul	McKenzie won with birdie on first extra hole
2	2009	SBS Kumho Asiana KPGA Championship	(South Korea) Hong Soon-sang	Lost to par on second extra hole
3	2016	GS Caltex Maekyung Open	(South Korea) Lee Soo-min	Won with par on second extra hole
4	2018	GS Caltex Maekyung Open	(India) Gaganjeet Bhullar, (South Korea) Chang Yi-keun, (South Korea) Hwang Jung-gon	Won with par on third extra hole Hwang eliminated by birdie on second hole Bhullar eliminated by par on first hole
5	2023	Genesis Championship	(South Korea) Bae Yong-jun, (South Korea) Im Sung-jae	Won with eagle on second extra hole Im eliminated by birdie on first hole
6	2024	SK Telecom Open	(South Korea) K. J. Choi	Lost to par on second extra hole

== Results in major championships ==
Results not in chronological order before 2019.

Tournament	2018	2019
Masters Tournament		
PGA Championship		
U.S. Open		
The Open Championship	CUT	T16

Did not play

CUT = missed the half-way cut
"T" = tied

== Results in World Golf Championships ==
Tournament	2018	2019
Championship		WD
Match Play		
Invitational		
Champions	T37	

Did not play

"T" = Tied
WD = withdrew
