= Kim Min-kyu (golfer) =

South Korean golfer

Personal information
- Nationality: South Korea
- Born: 24 March 2001 (age 25) Gwangju, Gyeonggi, South Korea
- Height: 1.75 m (5 ft 9 in)

Career
- Sport: Golf
- Turned professional: 2017
- Current tours: LIV Golf; Asian Tour; Korean Tour
- Former tours: European Tour; Challenge Tour; PGA EuroPro Tour
- Professional wins: 7

Number of wins by tour
- Asian Tour: 2
- Challenge Tour: 1
- Other: 4

Best results in major championships
- Masters Tournament: DNP
- PGA Championship: DNP
- U.S. Open: DNP
- The Open Championship: T31: 2024

Kim Min-kyu (Korean: 김민규; born 24 March 2001), also known as Minkyu Kim, is a South Korean professional golfer. Aged 17, he won the 2018 D+D Real Czech Challenge on the Challenge Tour becoming the youngest-ever winner on the tour.

== Professional career ==
Kim turned professional in early 2017 and won his first professional event on the Jamega Pro Golf Tour at the Windmill Hill Classic. Following this, Kim then played on the 2017 PGA EuroPro Tour. He won two tournaments in successive weeks in August, the Pentahotels Championship and FORE Business Championship. He was runner-up in the end-of-season Tour Championship Amendoeira Golf Resort and finished second in the Order of Merit to earn a place on the Challenge Tour for 2018.

In May 2018 he won the D+D Real Czech Challenge on the Challenge Tour becoming, at 17 years, 64 days, the youngest-ever winner on the tour.

In June 2022, Kim won the Kolon Korea Open; a co-sanctioned Asian Tour and Korean Tour event. He beat Cho Min-gyu in a three-hole aggregate playoff.

== Professional wins (7) ==
=== Asian Tour wins (2) ===
No.	Date	Tournament	Winning score	Margin of victory	Runner-up
1	26 Jun 2022	Kolon Korea Open^{1}	−4 (72-71-68-69=280)	Playoff	(South Korea) Cho Min-gyu
2	23 Jun 2024	Kolon Korea Open^{1} (2)	−11 (70-66-71-66=273)	3 strokes	(South Korea) Song Young-han

^{1}Co-sanctioned by the Korean Tour

Asian Tour playoff record (1–0)

No.	Year	Tournament	Opponent	Result
1	2022	Kolon Korea Open	(South Korea) Cho Min-gyu	Won three-hole aggregate playoff; Kim: E (3-5-4=12), Cho: +1 (3-4-6=13)

=== Challenge Tour wins (1) ===
No.	Date	Tournament	Winning score	Margin of victory	Runner-up
1	27 May 2018	D+D Real Czech Challenge	−20 (67-66-69-66=268)	3 strokes	(Sweden) Sebastian Söderberg

=== Korean Tour wins (3) ===
No.	Date	Tournament	Winning score	Margin of victory	Runner-up
1	26 Jun 2022	Kolon Korea Open^{1}	−4 (72-71-68-69=280)	Playoff	(South Korea) Cho Min-gyu
2	2 Jun 2024	Descente Korea Munsingwear Matchplay	20 holes		(South Korea) Cho Woo-young
3	23 Jun 2024	Kolon Korea Open^{1} (2)	−11 (70-66-71-66=273)	3 strokes	(South Korea) Song Young-han

^{1}Co-sanctioned by the Asian Tour

Korean Tour playoff record (1–1)

No.	Year	Tournament	Opponent(s)	Result
1	2020	KPGA Open	(South Korea) Kim Han-byeol, (South Korea) Lee Soo-min	Lee won with birdie on second extra hole Kim Han-byeol eliminated by birdie on first hole
2	2022	Kolon Korea Open	(South Korea) Cho Min-gyu	Won three-hole aggregate playoff; Kim: E (3-5-4=12), Cho: +1 (3-4-6=13)

=== PGA EuroPro Tour wins (2) ===
No.	Date	Tournament	Winning score	Margin of victory	Runner-up
1	18 Aug 2017	Pentahotels Championship	−14 (65-67-73=205)	2 strokes	(England) Stiggy Hodgson
2	25 Aug 2017	FORE Business Championship	−12 (68-63-73=204)	Playoff	(Republic of Ireland) Niall Kearney

=== Jamega Pro Golf Tour (1) ===
No.	Date	Tournament	Winning score	Margin of victory	Runners-up
1	7 Aug 2017	Windmill Hill Classic	−6 (67) (Note: Shortened to 18 holes due to weather.)	1 stroke	(England) Jamie Abbott, (England) Ben Storey, (England) Joshua White

== Results in major championships ==
Tournament	2022	2023	2024
Masters Tournament			
PGA Championship			
U.S. Open			
The Open Championship	CUT		T31

Did not play

CUT = missed the half-way cut
"T" = tied
