= OneAsia Tour seasons =

This page lists all OneAsia Tour seasons from its inaugural season in 2009.

Since its inception, most tournaments on OneAsia Tour have been played in Asia.

== 2009 season ==
=== Schedule ===
The following table lists official events during the 2009 season.

Date	Tournament	Host country	Purse (US$)	Winner (Note: The number in brackets after each winner's name is the number of OneAsia Tour events they had won up to and including that tournament. This information is only shown for OneAsia Tour members.)	OWGR points	Other tours (Note: ANZ − PGA Tour of Australasia; EUR − European Tour; KOR − Korean Tour.)
19 Apr	Volvo China Open	China	2,200,000	(Australia) Scott Strange (1)	18	EUR
~~10 May~~	Pine Valley Beijing Open	China	–	Cancelled	–	
13 Sep	Kolon-Hana Bank Korea Open	South Korea	₩1,000,000,000	(South Korea) Bae Sang-moon (1)	14	KOR
18 Oct	Midea China Classic	China	500,000	(China) Liang Wenchong (1)	6	
6 Dec	Australian Open	Australia	A$1,500,000	(Australia) Adam Scott (n/a)	32	ANZ (Note: PGA Tour of Australasia flagship event)
13 Dec	Australian PGA Championship	Australia	A$1,500,000	(Australia) Robert Allenby (n/a)	26	ANZ

=== Order of Merit ===
The Order of Merit was based on prize money won during the season, calculated in U.S. dollars.

Position	Player	Prize money ($)
1	(Australia) Scott Strange	505,784
2	(Australia) Adam Scott	274,579
3	(Australia) Robert Allenby	247,222
4	(Spain) Gonzalo Fernández-Castaño	244,440
5	(South Korea) Bae Sang-moon	244,299

== 2010 season ==
=== Schedule ===
The following table lists official events during the 2010 season.

Date	Tournament	Host country	Purse (US$)	Winner	OWGR points	Other tours
4 Apr	Luxehills Chengdu Open	China	1,000,000	(China) Liang Wenchong (2)	10	
18 Apr	Volvo China Open	China	2,500,000	(South Korea) Yang Yong-eun (1)	28	EUR
9 May	GS Caltex Maekyung Open	South Korea	₩800,000,000	(South Korea) Kim Dae-hyun (1)	6	KOR
23 May	SK Telecom Open	South Korea	₩900,000,000	(South Korea) Bae Sang-moon (2)	12	KOR
4 July	Indonesia Open	Indonesia	1,000,000	(New Zealand) Michael Hendry (1)	8	
29 Aug	Thailand Open	Thailand	1,000,000	(China) Liang Wenchong (3)	10	
10 Oct	Kolon Korea Open	South Korea	₩1,000,000,000	(South Korea) Yang Yong-eun (2)	12	KOR
17 Oct	Midea China Classic	China	1,000,000	(Australia) Kim Felton (1)	8	
~~24 Oct~~	Shandong Gold Cup Championship	China	–	Cancelled	–	
5 Dec	Australian Open	Australia	A$1,500,000	(Australia) Geoff Ogilvy (n/a)	32	ANZ
12 Dec	Australian PGA Championship	Australia	A$1,500,000	(Australia) Peter Senior (n/a)	22	ANZ

=== Order of Merit ===
The Order of Merit was based on prize money won during the season, calculated in U.S. dollars.

Position	Player	Prize money ($)
1	(China) Liang Wenchong	560,737
2	(South Korea) Kim Dae-hyun	272,154
3	(New Zealand) Michael Hendry	247,093
4	(South Korea) Bae Sang-moon	220,344
5	(Scotland) Simon Yates	208,760

== 2011 season ==
=== Schedule ===
The following table lists official events during the 2011 season.

Date	Tournament	Host country	Purse (US$)	Winner	OWGR points	Other tours
27 Mar	Indonesian PGA Championship	Indonesia	1,000,000	(Australia) Andre Stolz (1)	10	
24 Apr	Volvo China Open	China	CN¥20,000,000	(Belgium) Nicolas Colsaerts (n/a)	28	EUR
8 May	GS Caltex Maekyung Open	South Korea	₩1,000,000,000	(South Korea) Kim Kyung-tae (1)	10	KOR
22 May	SK Telecom Open	South Korea	₩900,000,000	(Australia) Kurt Barnes (1)	14	KOR
5 Jun	Nanshan China Masters	China	1,000,000	(South Korea) Kim Bi-o (1)	6	
~~10 Jul~~	Charity High 1 Resort Open	South Korea	–	Cancelled	–	KOR
17 Jul	Indonesia Open	Indonesia	1,000,000	(Thailand) Thaworn Wiratchant (1)	6	
14 Aug	Thailand Open	Thailand	1,000,000	(Australia) Andre Stolz (2)	8	
9 Oct	Kolon Korea Open	South Korea	₩1,000,000,000	(United States) Rickie Fowler (n/a)	26	KOR
13 Nov	Emirates Australian Open	Australia	A$1,500,000	(Australia) Greg Chalmers (n/a)	42	ANZ
27 Nov	Australian PGA Championship	Australia	A$1,500,000	(Australia) Greg Chalmers (n/a)	34	ANZ

=== Order of Merit ===
The Order of Merit was based on prize money won during the season, calculated in U.S. dollars.

Position	Player	Prize money ($)
1	(Australia) Andre Stolz	464,812
2	(South Korea) Kim Kyung-tae	327,178
3	(Thailand) Thaworn Wiratchant	235,813
4	(Australia) Kurt Barnes	210,830
5	(South Korea) Choi Jin-ho	169,790

== 2012 season ==
=== Schedule ===
The following table lists official events during the 2012 season.

Date	Tournament	Host country	Purse (US$)	Winner	OWGR points	Other tours
25 Mar	Enjoy Jakarta Indonesia Open	Indonesia	1,000,000	(Australia) Nick Cullen (n/a)	12	
22 Apr	Volvo China Open	China	CN¥20,000,000	(South Africa) Branden Grace (n/a)	32	EUR
13 May	GS Caltex Maekyung Open	South Korea	₩1,000,000,000	(South Korea) Kim Bi-o (2)	10	KOR
20 May	SK Telecom Open	South Korea	₩900,000,000	(South Korea) Kim Bi-o (3)	10	KOR
12 Aug	Thailand Open	Thailand	1,000,000	(England) Chris Wood (n/a)	6	
9 Sep	Charity High 1 Open	South Korea	₩1,000,000,000	(Australia) Matthew Griffin (1)	6	KOR
14 Oct	Nanshan China Masters	China	1,000,000	(China) Liang Wenchong (4)	12	
21 Oct	Kolon Korea Open	South Korea	₩1,000,000,000	(South Korea) Kim Dae-sub (1)	12	KOR
9 Dec	Emirates Australian Open	Australia	A$1,250,000	(Australia) Peter Senior (n/a)	32	ANZ
16 Dec	Australian PGA Championship	Australia	A$1,500,000	(Australia) Daniel Popovic (1)	18	ANZ

=== Order of Merit ===
The Order of Merit was based on prize money won during the season, calculated in U.S. dollars.

Position	Player	Prize money ($)
1	(South Korea) Kim Bi-o	380,746
2	(Australia) Daniel Popovic	239,462
3	(Australia) Matthew Griffin	230,857
4	(South Korea) Park Sang-hyun	216,492
5	(Australia) Nick Cullen	208,639

== 2013 season ==
=== Schedule ===
The following table lists official events during the 2013 season.

Date	Tournament	Host country	Purse (US$)	Winner	OWGR points	Other tours (Note: ANZ − PGA Tour of Australasia; EUR − European Tour; JPN − Japan Golf Tour; KOR − Korean Tour.)
17 Mar	Thailand Open	Thailand	1,000,000	(Thailand) Prayad Marksaeng (n/a)	18	JPN
31 Mar	Enjoy Jakarta Indonesia PGA Championship	Indonesia	1,000,000	(South Korea) Choi Ho-sung (1)	12	JPN
5 May	Volvo China Open	China	CN¥20,000,000	(Australia) Brett Rumford (1)	28	EUR
12 May	GS Caltex Maekyung Open	South Korea	₩1,000,000,000	(South Korea) Ryu Hyun-woo (1)	8	KOR
19 May	SK Telecom Open	South Korea	₩1,000,000,000	(Australia) Matthew Griffin (2)	6	KOR
13 Oct	Nanshan China Masters	China	1,000,000	(South Africa) Charl Schwartzel (n/a)	12	
20 Oct	Kolon Korea Open	South Korea	₩1,000,000,000	(South Korea) Kang Sung-hoon (n/a)	14	KOR
10 Nov	Australian PGA Championship	Australia	A$1,250,000	(Australia) Adam Scott (n/a)	22	ANZ
1 Dec	Emirates Australian Open	Australia	A$1,250,000	(Northern Ireland) Rory McIlroy (n/a)	32	ANZ
~~8 Dec~~	OneAsia Championship	China	–	Cancelled	–	

=== Order of Merit ===
The Order of Merit was based on prize money won during the season, calculated in U.S. dollars.

Position	Player	Prize money ($)
1	(Australia) Matthew Griffin	257,480
2	(South Korea) Ryu Hyun-woo	207,991
3	(South Korea) Choi Ho-sung	198,616
4	(Australia) Scott Strange	189,232
5	(China) Liang Wenchong	130,610

== 2014 season ==
=== Schedule ===
The following table lists official events during the 2014 season.

Date	Tournament	Host country	Purse (US$)	Winner	OWGR points	Other tours
~~23 Mar~~	Thailand Open	Thailand	–	Cancelled	–	JPN
30 Mar	Enjoy Jakarta Indonesia PGA Championship	Indonesia	1,000,000	(Japan) Michio Matsumura (n/a)	12	JPN
27 Apr	Volvo China Open	China	CN¥20,000,000	(France) Alexander Lévy (n/a)	32	EUR
11 May	GS Caltex Maekyung Open	South Korea	₩1,000,000,000	(South Korea) Park Jun-won (1)	10	KOR
18 May	SK Telecom Open	South Korea	₩1,000,000,000	(South Korea) Kim Seung-hyuk (1)	10	KOR
17 Aug	Fiji International	Fiji	1,000,000	(Australia) Steven Jeffress (1)	12	ANZ
12 Oct	Nanshan China Masters	China	1,000,000	(China) Li Haotong (1)	6	
26 Oct	Kolon Korea Open	South Korea	₩1,200,000,000	(South Korea) Kim Seung-hyuk (2)	12	KOR
30 Nov	Emirates Australian Open	Australia	A$1,250,000	(United States) Jordan Spieth (n/a)	34	ANZ
14 Dec	Australian PGA Championship	Australia	A$1,000,000	(Australia) Greg Chalmers (n/a)	24	ANZ

=== Order of Merit ===
The Order of Merit was based on prize money won during the season, calculated in U.S. dollars.

Position	Player	Prize money ($)
1	(South Korea) Kim Seung-hyuk	501,990
2	(China) Li Haotong	219,983
3	(South Korea) Park Jun-won	205,073
4	(Australia) Steven Jeffress	186,521
5	(South Korea) Park Sang-hyun	161,695

== 2015 season ==
=== Schedule ===
The following table lists official events during the 2015 season.

Date	Tournament	Host country	Purse (US$)	Winner	OWGR points	Other tours
26 Apr	Volvo China Open	China	CN¥20,000,000	(China) Wu Ashun (1)	26	EUR
17 May	GS Caltex Maekyung Open	South Korea	₩1,000,000,000	(South Korea) Moon Kyong-jun (1)	7	KOR
24 May	SK Telecom Open	South Korea	₩1,000,000,000	(South Korea) Choi Jin-ho (1)	8	KOR
14 Jun	Singha Corporation Thailand Open	Thailand	1,000,000	(South Korea) Kim Kyung-tae (2)	11	JPN
13 Sep	Kolon Korea Open	South Korea	₩1,200,000,000	(South Korea) Lee Kyoung-hoon (1)	7	KOR
18 Oct	Fiji International	Fiji	A$1,125,000	(United States) Matt Kuchar (n/a)	11	ANZ
29 Nov	Emirates Australian Open	Australia	A$1,250,000	(Australia) Matt Jones (n/a)	32	ANZ

=== Order of Merit ===
The Order of Merit was based on prize money won during the season, calculated in U.S. dollars.

Position	Player	Prize money ($)
1	(South Korea) Moon Kyong-jun	224,953
2	(South Korea) Choi Jin-ho	217,448
3	(South Korea) Wang Jeung-han	200,747
4	(New Zealand) Ryan Fox	127,425
5	(New Zealand) Gareth Paddison	109,634

== 2016 season ==
=== Schedule ===
The following table lists official events during the 2016 season.

Date	Tournament	Host country	Purse (US$)	Winner	OWGR points	Other tours
1 May	Volvo China Open	China	CN¥20,000,000	(China) Li Haotong (2)	26	EUR
8 May	GS Caltex Maekyung Open	South Korea	₩1,000,000,000	(South Korea) Park Sang-hyun (1)	11	KOR
11 Sep	Kolon Korea Open	South Korea	₩1,200,000,000	(South Korea) Lee Kyoung-hoon (2)	8	KOR
20 Nov	Emirates Australian Open	Australia	A$1,250,000	(United States) Jordan Spieth (n/a)	32	ANZ

=== Order of Merit ===
The Order of Merit was based on prize money won during the season, calculated in U.S. dollars.

Position	Player	Prize money ($)
1	(South Korea) Choi Jin-ho	116,295
2	(New Zealand) Ryan Fox	41,469
3	(South Korea) Kang Kyung-nam	37,800
4	(South Korea) Kim Bi-o	36,124
5	(South Korea) Kim Yeong-su	35,244

== 2017 season ==
=== Schedule ===
The following table lists official events during the 2017 season.

Date	Tournament	Host country	Purse (US$)	Winner	OWGR points	Other tours (Note: EUR − European Tour; KOR − Korean Tour.)
30 Apr	Volvo China Open	China	CN¥20,000,000	(France) Alexander Lévy (n/a)	24	EUR
7 May	GS Caltex Maekyung Open	South Korea	₩1,000,000,000	(South Korea) Lee Sang-hee (1)	9	KOR
4 Jun	Kolon Korea Open	South Korea	₩1,200,000,000	(South Korea) Chang Yi-keun (1)	8	KOR

=== Order of Merit ===
The Order of Merit was based on prize money won during the season, calculated in U.S. dollars.

Position	Player	Prize money ($)
1	(South Korea) Chang Yi-keun	270,303
2	(South Korea) Moon Kyong-jun	146,722
3	(South Korea) Kim Gi-whan	105,019
4	(South Korea) Choi Jin-ho	67,940
5	(Thailand) Phachara Khongwatmai	62,994

== 2018 season ==
=== Schedule ===
The following table lists official events during the 2018 season.

Date	Tournament	Host country	Purse (US$)	Winner	Other tours (Note: PGTA − PGT Asia.)
3 Mar	Solaire Philippine Open	Philippines	600,000	(Philippines) Miguel Tabuena (1)	PGTA

=== Order of Merit ===
The Order of Merit was based on prize money won during the season, calculated in U.S. dollars.

Position	Player	Prize money ($)
1	(Philippines) Miguel Tabuena	108,000
2	(Thailand) Prom Meesawat	66,000
3	(Netherlands) Guido van der Valk	37,800
4	(Australia) Michael Choi	30,000
5	(Malaysia) Nicholas Fung	15,900
