= 2018 Korean Tour =

Golf tour season

2018 Korean Tour season
- Duration: 19 April 2018 – 11 November 2018
- Number of official events: 17
- Most wins: (South Korea) Park Sang-hyun (3)
- Order of Merit: (South Korea) Lee Hyung-joon
- Player of the Year: (South Korea) Lee Hyung-joon
- Rookie of the Year: (South Korea) Ham Jeong-woo

The 2018 Korean Tour was the 41st season on the Korean Tour, the main professional golf tour in South Korea since it was formed in 1978.

== Schedule ==
The following table lists official events during the 2018 season.

Date	Tournament	Location	Purse (₩)	Winner (Note: The number in brackets after each winner's name is the number of Korean Tour events they had won up to and including that tournament. This information is only shown for Korean Tour members.)	OWGR points	Other tours (Note: ASA − Asian Tour.)	Notes
22 Apr	DB Insurance Promy Open	Gyeonggi	500,000,000	(South Korea) Jeon Ga-lam (1)	9		
6 May	GS Caltex Maekyung Open	Gyeonggi	1,000,000,000	(South Korea) Park Sang-hyun (6)	12	ASA	
20 May	SK Telecom Open	Gyeonggi	1,200,000,000	(South Korea) Kwon Sung-yeol (1)	9		
27 May	Genesis Championship	Gyeonggi	1,500,000,000	(South Korea) Lee Tae-hee (2)	9		
3 Jun	KB Financial Liiv Championship	Gyeonggi	700,000,000	(South Korea) Maeng Dong-seop (3)	9		New tournament
10 Jun	Descente Korea Munsingwear Matchplay	South Gyeongsang	1,000,000,000	(South Korea) Kim Meen-whee (2)	9		
17 Jun	KEB Hana Bank Invitational	Gyeonggi	1,000,000,000	(South Korea) Park Sang-hyun (7)	9		New tournament
24 Jun	Kolon Korea Open	South Chungcheong	1,200,000,000	(South Korea) Choi Min-chel (1)	12	ASA	
1 Jul	KPGA Championship	South Gyeongsang	1,000,000,000	(South Korea) Mun Do-yeob (1)	9		
8 Jul	NS HomeShopping Gunsan CC Jeonbuk Open	North Jeolla	500,000,000	(Canada) Sukwoan Ko (1)	9		
19 Aug	Dong-A Membership Group Busan Open	South Gyeongsang	500,000,000	(South Korea) Kim Tae-hoon (3)	9		
2 Sep	DGB Financial Group Daegu Gyeongbuk Open	North Gyeongsang	500,000,000	(South Korea) Kim Tae-woo (1)	9		
16 Sep	Shinhan Donghae Open	Gyeonggi	1,200,000,000	(South Korea) Park Sang-hyun (8)	12	ASA	
23 Sep	Huons Celebrity Pro-Am	South Chungcheong	500,000,000	(South Korea) Eom Jae-woong (1)	9		New Pro-Am tournament
28 Oct	Hyundai Insurance KJ Choi Invitational	South Gyeongsang	1,000,000,000	(South Korea) Park Sung-kug (1)	9		
4 Nov	A+Life Hyodam Jeju Open	Jeju	500,000,000	(South Korea) Park Hyo-won (1)	9		
11 Nov	Golfzon-DYB Education KPGA Tour Championship	Gyeonggi	500,000,000	(South Korea) Lee Jung-hwan (2)	9		

== Order of Merit ==
The Order of Merit was titled as the Genesis Points and was based on tournament results during the season, calculated using a points-based system. The leading player on the Order of Merit earned status to play on the 2019 European Tour.

Position	Player	Points	Status earned
1	(South Korea) Lee Hyung-joon	4,662	Forfeited exemption
2	(South Korea) Park Hyo-won	4,524	Promoted to European Tour
3	(South Korea) Park Sang-hyun	4,412	Promoted to European Tour (Note: Park earned European Tour status by finishing as the leading player (not otherwise exempt) on the 2018 Asian Tour Order of Merit.)
4	(South Korea) Maeng Dong-seop	3,893	
5	(South Korea) Mun Do-yeob	3,742	

== Awards ==
Award	Winner	Ref.
Player of the Year (Grand Prize Award)	(South Korea) Lee Hyung-joon	
Rookie of the Year (Myeong-chul Award)	(South Korea) Ham Jeong-woo	
