= OneAsia Tour =

Professional golf tour

- Sport: Golf
- Founded: 2009
- Founder: PGA Tour of Australasia; China Golf Association; Korean Golf Association; Korean PGA
- First season: 2009
- Folded: 2018
- Country: Based in Asia (Note: Schedules also included events in Australia and Fiji.)
- Most titles: Tournament wins: (China) Liang Wenchong (4)
- Related competitions: ASEAN PGA Tour

The OneAsia Tour was a men's professional golf tour based in the Asia-Pacific region. The tour was founded in 2009 as a joint venture between the PGA Tour of Australasia, the China Golf Association, the Korean Golf Association and the Korean PGA. The Japan Golf Tour was invited to participate in the project in 2012 and had co-sanctioned the Indonesia Open, Indonesia PGA Championship and Thailand Open. The OneAsia Tour was seen as a rival to the longer established Asian Tour, with which it had poor relations. From 2010 to 2017, tournaments on the OneAsia Tour were awarded Official World Golf Ranking points.

Having had a ten tournament schedule in each of its first few seasons, the tour's fortunes began to decline. Being reliant on co-sanctioning arrangements to fill out the calendar; only one event was not co-sanctioned in 2013 and 2014. Tour members were afforded a limited number of places in the tournaments. In 2015, there were just seven tournaments, all co-sanctioned with other tours. In 2016, there were just four, and one fewer in 2017. Early in 2018, having not hosted a sole-sanctioned event for three years, the tour lost its right to offer world ranking points.

Early 2018 saw an extensive restructuring of the organisation with a new management team put in place in an attempt to revive the tour. A Qualifying school was organised, but due to the lack of status of the tour, having lost world ranking points and without any calendar of tournaments, there were less than 20 entrants. To start the new season OneAsia co-sanctioned the Solaire Philippine Open and had plans for a further four tournaments in 2018, but these were not played. One tournament was scheduled for 2019, but ultimately no tournaments were played.

== Formation ==
In January 2009, it was announced that there would be a new series of events across the Asia-Pacific region, to be organised by the PGA of Australia in co-operation with China Golf Association, the Japan Golf Tour, the Korean Golf Association and the Korean PGA. The aim of these events would be to raise the profile of professional golf in the region and to compete with the likes of the European Tour. The series would initially comprise six events, three in China, two in Australia and one in South Korea, with plans to expand in later years.

The introduction of the OneAsia Tour was not welcomed by the Asian Tour. All of the six events announced for 2009 were existing tournaments, including some already sanctioned by the Asian Tour. One of them, the Pine Valley Beijing Open, was called off a few weeks before it was due to be held. The organisers officially attributed this decision to the state of the course and a clash of dates with The Players Championship on the PGA Tour, but some media commentators dismissed these reasons since the tournament had clashed with the Players Championship the previous year as well and instead attributed the cancellation to sponsor discontent with the sanctioning changes.

Following a meeting with the Official World Golf Ranking (OWGR) at The Open Championship in July 2009, all OneAsia Tour events were awarded OWGR points. In May 2018, the OWGR revoked the Tour's world ranking eligibility.

== Order of Merit winners ==
Year	Winner	Prize money (US$)
2018	(Philippines) Miguel Tabuena	108,000
2017	(South Korea) Chang Yi-keun	270,303
2016	(South Korea) Choi Jin-ho	116,295
2015	(South Korea) Moon Kyong-jun	224,953
2014	(South Korea) Kim Seung-hyuk	501,990
2013	(Australia) Matthew Griffin	257,480
2012	(South Korea) Kim Bi-o	380,746
2011	(Australia) Andre Stolz	464,812
2010	(China) Liang Wenchong	560,737
2009	(Australia) Scott Strange	505,784
