= Lee Jung-hwan =

South Korean professional golfer (born 1991)

Personal information
- Nationality: South Korea
- Born: 7 September 1991 (age 35) Gwangju, South Korea
- Height: 1.88 m (6 ft 2 in)
- Weight: 88 kg (194 lb; 13.9 st)

Career
- Sport: Golf
- Turned professional: 2009
- Current tours: European Tour; Korean Tour
- Former tours: Asian Tour; PGA Tour China
- Professional wins: 3

Number of wins by tour
- European Tour: 1
- Other: 2

Lee Jung-hwan (born 7 September 1991), also known as Junghwan Lee, is a South Korean professional golfer who plays on the European Tour and Korean Tour. He won the 2025 Genesis Championship.

== Career ==
Lee turned professional in 2009 and made his Korean Tour debut in 2010. He spent 2015 on the PGA Tour China where he tied for 3rd at the Cadillac Championship.

In 2017, he claimed his maiden Korean Tour victory at the Kaido Golden V1 Open and was runner-up at the Descente Korea Munsingwear Matchplay, to finish second in the Order of Merit. He followed this up with his second win the following season at the Golfzon-DYB Education KPGA Tour Championship.

Lee played on the Asian Tour in 2022, where he tied for tenth at the International Series Korea.

In 2023, Lee was runner-up at the iMBank Open, KB Financial Liiv Championship and GS Caltex Maekyung Open to finish second in the Order of Merit. He secured his maiden European Tour title at the co-sanctioned Genesis Championship on home soil in 2025, following a final round seven under par 64 to win by three strokes ahead of Laurie Canter and Nacho Elvira.

== Professional wins (3) ==
=== European Tour wins (1) ===
No.	Date	Tournament	Winning score	To par	Margin of victory	Runners-up
1	26 Oct 2025	Genesis Championship^{1}	71-65-73-64=273	−11	3 strokes	(England) Laurie Canter, (Spain) Nacho Elvira

^{1}Co-sanctioned by the Korean Tour

=== Korean Tour wins (3) ===
No.	Date	Tournament	Winning score	To par	Margin of victory	Runner(s)-up
1	18 Jun 2017	Caido Golden V1 Open	66-67-67-71=271	−17	Playoff	(South Korea) Kim Seung-hyuk
2	11 Nov 2018	Golfzon-DYB Education KPGA Tour Championship	70-66-69-69=274	−6	1 stroke	(South Korea) Jung Ji-ho, (South Korea) Lee Sung-ho
3	26 Oct 2025	Genesis Championship^{1}	71-65-73-64=273	−11	3 strokes	(England) Laurie Canter, (Spain) Nacho Elvira

^{1}Co-sanctioned by the European Tour

Korean Tour playoff record (1–0)

No.	Year	Tournament	Opponent	Result
1	2017	Caido Golden V1 Open	(South Korea) Kim Seung-hyuk	Won with par on first extra hole
