= Asian Tour International =

Tournament information
- Location: Thailand
- Established: 2008
- Courses: Suwan Golf and Country Club
- Par: 72
- Length: 7,110 yards (6,500 m)
- Tour: Asian Tour
- Format: Stroke play
- Prize fund: US$300,000
- Month played: February
- Final year: 2010

Tournament record score
- Aggregate: 265 Lin Wen-tang (2008)
- To par: −23 as above

Final champion
- (India) Gaganjeet Bhullar
- Location in Thailand

The Asian Tour International was a golf tournament on the Asian Tour, played in Thailand from 2008 to 2010.

In 2009, following the cancellation of the Emaar-MGF Indian Masters, the Asian Tour International was rescheduled to be the season opening event.

== Winners ==
Year	Winner	Score	To par	Margin of victory	Runner-up	Venue
2010	(India) Gaganjeet Bhullar	277	−11	1 stroke	(South Korea) Hwang Inn-choon	Suwan
2009	(South Africa) James Kamte	268	−16	2 strokes	(Japan) Tetsuji Hiratsuka	Suwan
2008	(Taiwan) Lin Wen-tang	265	−23	5 strokes	(South Korea) Noh Seung-yul	Pattana
