= Kang Sung-hoon (golfer) =

South Korean golfer

Personal information
- Nickname: Shaggy Kang
- Nationality: South Korea
- Born: 4 June 1987 (age 39) Jeju City, South Korea
- Height: 5 ft 8 in (1.73 m)
- Weight: 170 lb (77 kg; 12 st)

Career
- Sport: Golf
- College: Yonsei University
- Turned professional: 2007
- Current tours: PGA Tour; European Tour; Korean Tour
- Former tours: Web.com Tour; Asian Tour
- Professional wins: 5
- Highest ranking: 52 (8 March 2020) (as of 25 October 2026)

Number of wins by tour
- PGA Tour: 1
- Asian Tour: 1
- Other: 4

Best results in major championships
- Masters Tournament: T29: 2020
- PGA Championship: 7th: 2019
- U.S. Open: T18: 2016
- The Open Championship: T44: 2017

Achievements and awards
- Korean Tour Rookie of the Year: 2008
Medal record
Asian Games
Gold medal – first place	2006 Doha	Men's team

Kang Sung-hoon (Korean: 강성훈; born 4 June 1987), also known as Sung Kang, is a South Korean professional golfer who plays on the PGA Tour. He won the 2019 AT&T Byron Nelson, his first win on the PGA Tour.

== Amateur career ==
In April 2006 Kang won the SBS Lotte Skyhill Open, the opening event of the Korean Tour season. Later in the month he played in the 2006 Bonallack Trophy in New Zealand, representing Asia/Pacific against Europe. In October he represented South Korea in the 2006 Eisenhower Trophy in South Africa. The team finished 5th while Kang had the 6th best individual score. He was also the gold medalist at the 2006 Asian Games, which exempted him from mandatory military service.

== Professional career ==
Kang turned professional in 2007 and joined the Korean Tour. He first gained international prominence in 2009 when he lost in a playoff for the Ballantine's Championship, a tournament co-sanctioned by the Korean Tour, the European Tour and the Asian Tour. In 2010 Kang won for his first Korean Tour event as a professional at the Eugene Securities Open, and ended the season by finished tied for 16th place in the PGA Tour qualifying school to gain a place on the tour for 2011.

In May 2011, Kang lost a playoff for the BMW Charity Pro-Am on the Nationwide Tour. The following month, he qualified for the U. S. Open, his first major, and finished in a tie for 39th. Kang retained his PGA Tour card for 2012, helped by finishing tied for third place at the Children's Miracle Network Classic, ending the season 120th on the money list. In October 2011 he was a runner-up in the Shinhan Donghae Open, a Korean Tour event, finishing a stroke behind Paul Casey. 2012 was a much less successful season and he failed to retain his place on the tour.

Kang played on the Web.com Tour from 2013 to 2015. In October 2013 he won two tournaments in Korea in successive weeks, the CJ Invitational and the Kolon Korea Open. He did not win on the Web.com Tour but was runner-up in the Utah Championship in both 2014 and 2015, losing in a playoff in 2015 to Patton Kizzire. He finished 2015 in 22nd place in the Web.com Tour regular season standings to earn a return to the PGA Tour for 2016.

Since 2016 Kang has played on the PGA Tour. At the 2016 AT&T Pebble Beach National Pro-Am, Kang shot a course record 60 during the second round at the Monterrey Peninsula course. This took him into a share of the lead moving into the weekend: he finished the tournament tied for 17th. The following two weeks he finished in the top 10 in the Northern Trust Open and The Honda Classic.

In April 2017, Kang took a three shot lead into the final round of the Shell Houston Open, the first time in his career he had held the 54-hole lead in a PGA Tour event. He finished second to Russell Henley. Two weeks later a good result in the RBC Heritage moved him into the top-100 of the world rankings for the first time, receiving an entry to the 2017 PGA Championship. He also finished tied for 5th in the Quicken Loans National, one of the Open Qualifying Series, to get an entry to the 2017 Open Championship. He tied for 44th place in both his 2017 major appearances.

In July 2018, Kang was involved in a rules controversy at the Quicken Loans National tournament when he was accused of cheating by his playing partner Joel Dahmen. On the dogleg-left 566-yard par-5 10th hole, Kang's second shot landed in the hazard left of the green. After a short search, a spotter located Kang's ball some 5 to 8 yards into the hazard. There was no way Kang could play the ball. Instead, he began pointing to the spot at which he thought it had entered the hazard; nearly pin-high. Because the 10th hole is a dogleg left with a hazard all the way down the left side, Kang's ball would have needed to re-cross the hazard nearer the green in order to earn the drop he was requesting. The exact line his ball had taken en route to its final resting place thus came under careful scrutiny. There was a discussion with a rules official, Dahmen and Kang which reached an impasse as another group played through. After further discussion, Kang conceded that his ball more likely crossed the hazard 35 yards from the pin rather than his first suggestion. Kang dropped the ball at a point 37 yards from the hole, hit his approach to 17 feet, and holed the putt for a par. Later that night, Dahmen accused Kang of cheating on Twitter. The PGA Tour released a statement indicating that they regarded the issue as closed: "With no clear evidence to prove otherwise, it was determined by the official that Kang could proceed with his fourth shot as intended, following a penalty stroke and subsequent drop. The PGA Tour will have no additional comment on this matter." Kang finished third in the event, his best result of the season, and earned a place in the field for the 2018 Open Championship, while Dahmen finished T23.

In May 2019, Kang won the AT&T Byron Nelson for his first PGA Tour victory in his 159th start. He matched the course record with a 10-under 61 in the second round, and matched the tournament record with a 23-under 261 total.

== Personal life ==
Kang and his wife, Kang So-young, have a son.

== Professional wins (5) ==
=== PGA Tour wins (1) ===
No.	Date	Tournament	Winning score	Margin of victory	Runners-up
1	12 May 2019	AT&T Byron Nelson	−23 (65-61-68-67=261)	2 strokes	(United States) Matt Every, (United States) Scott Piercy

=== Asian Tour wins (1) ===
No.	Date	Tournament	Winning score	Margin of victory	Runners-up
1	13 Oct 2013	CJ Invitational^{1}	−12 (68-69-69-70=276)	5 strokes	(South Korea) Kim Tae-hoon, (India) Jyoti Randhawa

^{1}Co-sanctioned by the Korean Tour

Asian Tour playoff record (0–1)

No.	Year	Tournament	Opponents	Result
1	2009	Ballantine's Championship	(Spain) Gonzalo Fernández-Castaño, (Thailand) Thongchai Jaidee	Jaidee won with birdie on first extra hole

=== OneAsia Tour wins (1) ===
No.	Date	Tournament	Winning score	Margin of victory	Runners-up
1	20 Oct 2013	Kolon Korea Open^{1}	−4 (68-70-73-69=280)	1 stroke	(South Korea) Kim Hyung-tae, (South Korea) Lee Chang-woo (a), (South Korea) Lee Sang-hee, (Northern Ireland) Rory McIlroy, (South Korea) Mo Joong-kyung

^{1}Co-sanctioned by the Korean Tour

=== Korean Tour wins (4) ===
No.	Date	Tournament	Winning score	Margin of victory	Runner(s)-up
1	16 Apr 2006	SBS Lotte Skyhill Open (as an amateur)	−2 (68-70-76=214) (Note: Shortened to 54 holes due to weather.)	2 strokes	(South Korea) Shin Yong-jin
2	17 Apr 2010	Eugene Securities Open	−11 (72-70-67-68=277)	5 strokes	(South Korea) Choi Ho-sung, (South Korea) Jang Dong-kyu
3	13 Oct 2013	CJ Invitational^{1}	−12 (68-69-69-70=276)	5 strokes	(South Korea) Kim Tae-hoon, (India) Jyoti Randhawa
4	20 Oct 2013	Kolon Korea Open^{2}	−4 (68-70-73-69=280)	1 stroke	(South Korea) Kim Hyung-tae, (South Korea) Lee Chang-woo (a), (South Korea) Lee Sang-hee, (Northern Ireland) Rory McIlroy, (South Korea) Mo Joong-kyung

^{1}Co-sanctioned by the Asian Tour
^{2}Co-sanctioned by the OneAsia Tour

Korean Tour playoff record (0–2)

No.	Year	Tournament	Opponents	Result
1	2009	Ballantine's Championship	(Spain) Gonzalo Fernández-Castaño, (Thailand) Thongchai Jaidee	Jaidee won with birdie on first extra hole
2	2017	Hyundai Insurance KJ Choi Invitational	(South Korea) Choi Min-chel, (South Korea) Hwang Inn-choon	Hwang won with par on fourth extra hole Choi eliminated by par on second hole

== Playoff record ==
European Tour playoff record (0–1)

No.	Year	Tournament	Opponents	Result
1	2009	Ballantine's Championship	(Spain) Gonzalo Fernández-Castaño, (Thailand) Thongchai Jaidee	Jaidee won with birdie on first extra hole

Web.com Tour playoff record (0–2)

No.	Year	Tournament	Opponent	Result
1	2011	BMW Charity Pro-Am	(South Africa) Garth Mulroy	Lost to par on first extra hole
2	2015	Utah Championship	(United States) Patton Kizzire	Lost to birdie on second extra hole

== Results in major championships ==
Results not in chronological order in 2020.

Tournament	2011	2012	2013	2014	2015	2016	2017	2018
Masters Tournament								
U.S. Open	T39					T18		
The Open Championship							T44	T67
PGA Championship							T44	

Tournament	2019	2020	2021	2022	2023	2024
Masters Tournament		T29				
PGA Championship	7	79				
U.S. Open		CUT	CUT			CUT
The Open Championship	CUT	NT				

Top 10
Did not play

CUT = missed the half-way cut
"T" = tied
NT = no tournament due to COVID-19 pandemic

=== Summary ===
Tournament	Wins	2nd	3rd	Top-5	Top-10	Top-25	Events	Cuts made
Masters Tournament	0	0	0	0	0	0	1	1
PGA Championship	0	0	0	0	1	1	3	3
U.S. Open	0	0	0	0	0	1	5	2
The Open Championship	0	0	0	0	0	0	3	2
Totals	0	0	0	0	1	2	12	8

- Most consecutive cuts made – 6 (2011 U.S. Open – 2019 PGA Championship)
- Longest streak of top-10s – 1

== Results in The Players Championship ==
Tournament	2012	2013	2014	2015	2016	2017	2018	2019	2020	2021
The Players Championship	T61					T30	CUT	T47	C	CUT

Did not play

CUT = missed the halfway cut
"T" indicates a tie for a place
C = Cancelled after the first round due to the COVID-19 pandemic

== Results in World Golf Championships ==
Tournament	2019	2020
Championship		71
Match Play		NT^{1}
Invitational	60	T44
Champions		NT^{1}

^{1}Cancelled due to COVID-19 pandemic

Did not play

NT = No tournament
"T" = Tied

== Team appearances ==
Amateur

- Eisenhower Trophy (representing South Korea): 2006
- Bonallack Trophy (representing Asia/Pacific): 2006

Professional

- EurAsia Cup (representing Asia): 2018

== See also ==
- 2010 PGA Tour Qualifying School graduates
- 2015 Web.com Tour Finals graduates
