= Hana Bank Invitational =

Tournament information
- Location: Chuncheon, South Korea
- Established: 2008
- Course: Nam Chun Cheon Country Club
- Par: 72
- Length: 7,293 yards (6,669 m)
- Tours: Japan Golf Tour; Korean Tour
- Format: Stroke play
- Prize fund: ₩1,300,000,000
- Month played: June

Tournament record score
- Aggregate: 267 Park Sang-hyun (2018); 267 Richard T. Lee (2021); 267 Jun Seok Lee (2022)
- To par: −21 Park Sang-hyun (2018) −21 Jun Seok Lee (2022)

Current champion
- (South Korea) Jang Yu-bin

Location map
- Location in South Korea

The Hana Bank Invitational (Korean: 하나은행 인비테이셔널) is a men's professional golf tournament currently played in Japan and formerly in South Korea and China. The 2018 event was held in June on the west course at the Lakeside Country Club near Yongin. Prize money was ₩1,000,000,000. In 2019 the event moved to the nearby 88 Country Club with increased prize money of ₩1,200,000,000.

The field includes a number of invited Japanese and Chinese golfers. A similar event, the "Korea-China Tour KEB Invitational", which included Korean and Chinese golfers, was held six times from 2008 to 2010. The event was held twice a year, once in China and once in South Korea.

In 2023, the event moved location to Japan, being played at the Chiba Isumi Golf Club in Otaki, Chiba. The event also gained Japan Golf Tour co-sanctioning.

== Winners ==
Year	Tour(s) (Note: JPN − Japan Golf Tour; KOR − Korean Tour.)	Winner	Score	To par	Margin of victory	Runner(s)-up	Venue
Hana Bank Invitational
2026	KOR	(South Korea) Jang Yu-bin	274	−10	1 stroke	(South Korea) Kim Min-jun	Nam Chun Cheon
2025	JPN, KOR	(South Africa) Shaun Norris	270	−18	Playoff	(Japan) Yusuke Sakamoto	The Heaven
2024	JPN, KOR	(Japan) Takashi Ogiso	270	−14	1 stroke	(South Korea) Jang Yu-bin	Nam Chun Cheon
2023	JPN, KOR	(South Korea) Yang Ji-ho	272	−20	1 stroke	(Japan) Keita Nakajima	Chiba Isumi
2022	KOR	(Australia) Jun Seok Lee	267	−21	1 stroke	(South Korea) Lee Gyu-min	Nam Chun Cheon
2021	KOR	(Canada) Richard T. Lee	267	−17	4 strokes	(South Korea) Kim Min-kyu	Bear's Best Cheongna
2020: No tournament
KEB Hana Bank Invitational
2019	KOR	(South Korea) Seo Yo-seop	271	−13	2 strokes	(Japan) Daijiro Izumida (South Korea) Joo Heung-chol (South Korea) Jung Han-mil	88 CC
2018	KOR	(South Korea) Park Sang-hyun	267	−21	1 stroke	(South Korea) Lee Sung-ho	Lakeside
2011–2017: No tournament
Korea-China Tour KEB Invitational
2010 (Sep)	KOR	(South Korea) Hwang Inn-choon	274	−14	3 strokes	(South Korea) Kim Bi-o	Welli Hilli
2010 (Mar)	KOR	(South Korea) Kim Hyung-tae	277	−11	4 strokes	(South Korea) Kang Sung-hoon	Shanghai Links
KEB Invitational
2009 (Sep)	KOR	(South Korea) Kim Dae-hyun	283	−5	1 stroke	(South Korea) Lee Seong-ho	Welli Hilli
2009 (Apr)	KOR	(South Korea) Lee Tae-gyu	276	−12	1 stroke	(South Korea) Choi In-sik (South Korea) Hur In-hoi (Australia) Richard Moir	Dongguan Hillview
2008 (Sep)	KOR	(South Korea) Kim Dae-sub	280	−8	Playoff	(South Korea) Kim Dae-hyun	Welli Hilli
2008 (Mar)	KOR	(South Korea) Bae Sang-moon	287	−1	1 stroke	(South Korea) Suk Jong-yul	Shanghai Silport
