= Kim Do-hoon (disambiguation) =

Kim Do-hoon may refer to:

- Kim Do-hoon, (born 1970), South Korean footballer
- Kim Do-hoon (golfer, born March 1989), South Korean golfer
- Kim Do-hoon (golfer, born April 1989), South Korean golfer
- Kim Do-hoon (actor) (born 1998), South Korean actor
