= Bae Sang-moon =

South Korean professional golfer (born 1986)

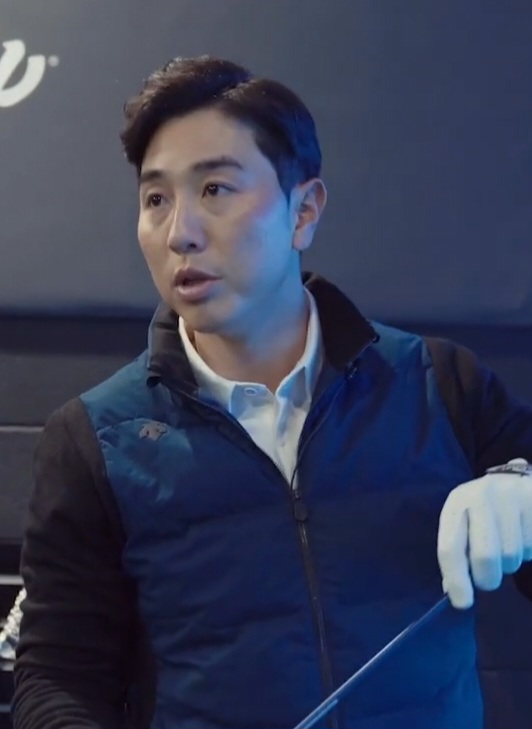

Personal information
- Nationality: South Korea
- Born: 21 June 1986 (age 40) Daegu, South Korea
- Height: 6 ft 0 in (1.83 m)
- Weight: 180 lb (82 kg; 13 st)

Career
- Sport: Golf
- College: Daegu University
- Turned professional: 2004
- Current tours: PGA Tour (past champion status); Korn Ferry Tour; Korean Tour
- Former tours: Japan Golf Tour; Asian Tour
- Professional wins: 16
- Highest ranking: 26 (20 November 2011)

Number of wins by tour
- PGA Tour: 2
- Japan Golf Tour: 3
- Asian Tour: 3
- Korn Ferry Tour: 1
- Other: 7

Best results in major championships
- Masters Tournament: T33: 2015
- PGA Championship: T54: 2012
- U.S. Open: T42: 2011
- The Open Championship: T64: 2012

Achievements and awards
- Korean Tour Order of Merit winner: 2009
- Korean Tour Player of the Year: 2009
- Japan Golf Tour money list winner: 2011
- Japan Golf Tour Most Valuable Player: 2011

Bae Sang-moon (Korean: 배상문; born 21 June 1986), or Sang-moon Bae, is a South Korean professional golfer who plays on the PGA Tour.

== Professional career ==
Bae turned professional in 2004. He won the 2006 Emerson Pacific Group Open on the Korean Tour, and in 2007 he won the SK Telecom Open, an Asian Tour and Korean Tour co-sanctioned event held in his home country. In 2008, he won his home country's open, the Kolon-Hana Bank Korea Open. In 2009, he won the GS Caltex Maekyung Open.

In 2011, Bae finished as the leading money winner on the Japan Golf Tour for the season after winning three tournaments. Bae was the second consecutive Korean to take this accolade after Kim Kyung-tae's success in 2010. His three victories all came within two months of each other at the Vana H Cup KBC Augusta, the Coca-Cola Tokai Classic and the Japan Open. At the end of the year, he competed at the PGA Tour Qualifying Tournament, where he finished T11 to secure his playing rights for the 2012 PGA Tour season. He also reached his career high world ranking of 26th in 2011.

Bae started the season very strongly, making all of his first eight cuts on the PGA Tour. He recorded his first top-10 finish of the year when he reached the quarter-finals at the 2012 WGC-Accenture Match Play Championship, knocking out Ian Poulter and Charl Schwartzel before losing to Rory McIlroy. In March 2012, Bae lost in a four-man playoff at the Transitions Championship on the PGA Tour. After finishing at −13 for the tournament, he lost the playoff when Luke Donald holed a birdie putt on the first extra hole to defeat Bae, Jim Furyk and Robert Garrigus. He finished his debut season making 17 out of 25 cuts and ended up 71st in the FedEx Cup standings, one position outside of qualifying for the third playoff event.

In May 2013, Bae won his first PGA Tour event at the HP Byron Nelson Championship, beating Keegan Bradley by two strokes. Bae entered the final round a single stroke behind Bradley, but birdied four out of his first seven holes to move four ahead. However Bae double-bogeyed the ninth after finding water and bogeyed the 10th and 15th to drop back to a share of the lead. Bae then proceeded to birdie the 16th and when Bradley bogeyed the 17th, Bae had a comfortable two shot lead to come down the 18th and secure his maiden victory. He became just the fourth South Korean-born winner on the PGA Tour, after K. J. Choi, Yang Yong-eun, and Kevin Na.

Bae was embroiled in political controversy late 2014 after his work visa expired and he had yet to serve twenty-one months in the South Korean military as required of men age 18–35. By comparison, K. J. Choi and Yang Yong-eun completed their military requirements before turning professional. Bae countered that he had residency in the U.S. and was exempt. In July 2015, a South Korean court ruled Bae spent too much time in South Korea to be exempt and must fulfill his military requirement. In response, the PGA Tour created a "Mandatory Obligation" category that would allow Bae to retain his exemption after completing his service, similar to the major medical exemption.

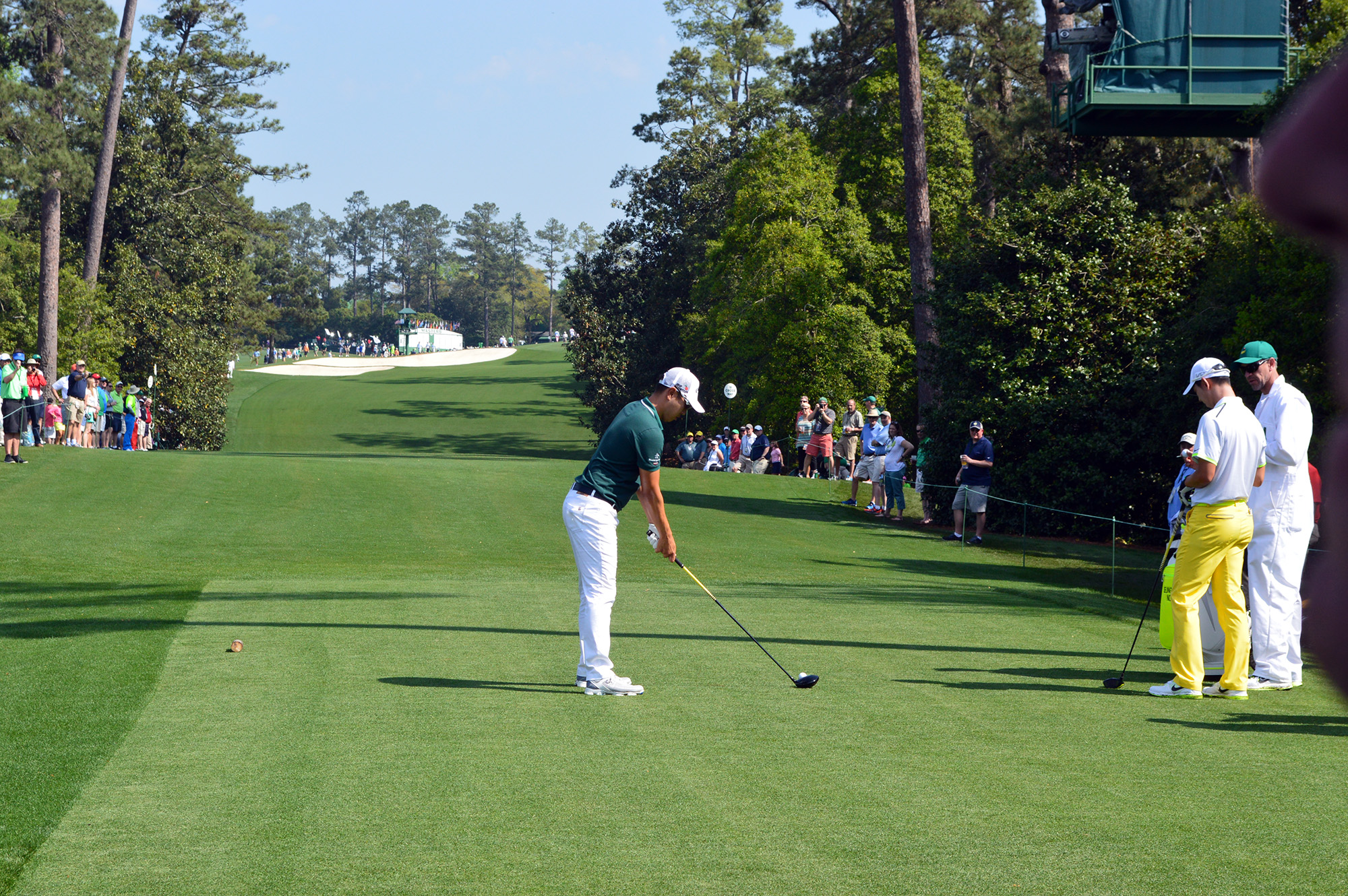
Bae Sang-moon at the 2015 Masters Tournament.

Bae earned an invitation to the 2015 Presidents Cup as a captain's pick by Nick Price. It was his last event before military service, which began in November 2015. His military service ended in August 2017.

Bae made his return to professional golf at the 2017 Shinhan Donghae Open, an event he won twice as a member of the Korean Tour. His PGA Tour return came at the Safeway Open. Bae finished 202nd in the FedEx Cup, but earned entry to the Web.com Tour Finals via his military exemption. He won the Albertsons Boise Open and regained his PGA Tour card for the 2018–19 season.

== Professional wins (15) ==
=== PGA Tour wins (2) ===
No.	Date	Tournament	Winning score	To par	Margin of victory	Runner-up
1	19 May 2013	HP Byron Nelson Championship	66-66-66-69=267	−13	2 strokes	(United States) Keegan Bradley
2	12 Oct 2014	Frys.com Open	66-69-65-73=273	−15	2 strokes	(Australia) Steven Bowditch

PGA Tour playoff record (0–1)

No.	Year	Tournament	Opponents	Result
1	2012	Transitions Championship	(England) Luke Donald, (United States) Jim Furyk, (United States) Robert Garrigus	Donald won with birdie on first extra hole

=== Japan Golf Tour wins (3) ===
Legend
Flagship events (1)
Japan majors (1) (Note: The 2011 Japan Open Golf Championship was also a Japan major championship.)
Other Japan Golf Tour (2)

No.	Date	Tournament	Winning score	To par	Margin of victory	Runner(s)-up
1	28 Aug 2011	Vana H Cup KBC Augusta	65-64-70-67=266	−22	2 strokes	(Japan) Ryo Ishikawa, (Japan) Tomohiro Kondo
2	2 Oct 2011	Coca-Cola Tokai Classic	69-67-72-73=281	−7	1 stroke	(Japan) Tadahiro Takayama
3	16 Oct 2011	Japan Open Golf Championship	69-74-68-71=282	−2	Playoff	(Japan) Kenichi Kuboya

Japan Golf Tour playoff record (1–1)

No.	Year	Tournament	Opponent	Result
1	2011	Japan Open Golf Championship	(Japan) Kenichi Kuboya	Won with par on first extra hole
2	2011	Mynavi ABC Championship	(Japan) Koichiro Kawano	Lost to birdie on sixth extra hole

=== Asian Tour wins (3) ===
No.	Date	Tournament	Winning score	To par	Margin of victory	Runner(s)-up
1	27 May 2007	SK Telecom Open^{1}	64-69-71-67=271	−17	6 strokes	(Australia) Aaron Baddeley, (South Korea) Kim Hyung-tae
2	5 Oct 2008	Kolon-Hana Bank Korea Open^{1}	67-70-67-69=273	−11	1 stroke	(England) Ian Poulter
3	17 May 2009	GS Caltex Maekyung Open^{1}	71-70-70-70=281	−7	Playoff	(South Korea) Ted Oh

^{1}Co-sanctioned by the Korean Tour

Asian Tour playoff record (1–0)

No.	Year	Tournament	Opponent	Result
1	2009	GS Caltex Maekyung Open	(South Korea) Ted Oh	Won with par on second extra hole

=== Web.com Tour wins (1) ===
Legend
Finals events (1)
Other Web.com Tour (0)

No.	Date	Tournament	Winning score	To par	Margin of victory	Runners-up
1	16 Sep 2018	Albertsons Boise Open	65-67-67-66=265	−19	1 stroke	(United States) Anders Albertson, (United States) Adam Schenk, (Canada) Roger Sloan

=== OneAsia Tour wins (2) ===
No.	Date	Tournament	Winning score	To par	Margin of victory	Runner-up
1	13 Sep 2009	Kolon-Hana Bank Korea Open^{1}	71-71-65-67=271	−10	1 stroke	(South Korea) Kim Dae-sub
2	23 May 2010	SK Telecom Open^{1}	68-65-66-67=266	−22	3 strokes	(South Korea) Kim Dae-hyun

^{1}Co-sanctioned by the Korean Tour

=== Korean Tour wins (9) ===
No.	Date	Tournament	Winning score	To par	Margin of victory	Runner(s)-up
1	5 Nov 2006	SBS Emerson Pacific Group Open	70-66-70-69=275	−13	6 strokes	(South Korea) Kang Kyung-nam
2	27 May 2007	SK Telecom Open^{1}	64-69-71-67=271	−17	6 strokes	(Australia) Aaron Baddeley, (South Korea) Kim Hyung-tae
3	23 Mar 2008	KEB Invitational (1st)	66-75-71-75=287	−1	1 stroke	(South Korea) Suk Jong-yul
4	5 Oct 2008	Kolon-Hana Bank Korea Open^{1}	67-70-67-69=273	−11	1 stroke	(England) Ian Poulter
5	17 May 2009	GS Caltex Maekyung Open^{1}	71-70-70-70=281	−7	Playoff	(South Korea) Ted Oh
6	13 Sep 2009	Kolon-Hana Bank Korea Open^{2} (2)	71-71-65-67=271	−10	1 stroke	(South Korea) Kim Dae-sub
7	23 May 2010	SK Telecom Open^{2}	68-65-66-67=266	−22	3 strokes	(South Korea) Kim Dae-hyun
8	29 Sep 2013	Shinhan Donghae Open	72-66-68-63=279	−9	3 strokes	(South Korea) Ryu Hyun-woo
9	9 Nov 2014	Shinhan Donghae Open (2)	69-67-68-71=275	−13	5 strokes	(South Korea) Kim Bong-sub, (South Korea) Moon Kyong-jun

^{1}Co-sanctioned by the Asian Tour
^{2}Co-sanctioned by the OneAsia Tour

Korean Tour playoff record (1–1)

No.	Year	Tournament	Opponent(s)	Result
1	2009	GS Caltex Maekyung Open	(South Korea) Ted Oh	Won with par on second extra hole
2	2009	SBS Johnnie Walker Blue Label Open	(South Korea) Hwang Inn-choon, (South Korea) Kim Dae-sub, (South Korea) Maeng Dong-seop	Maeng won with birdie on first extra hole

=== Other wins (1) ===
- 2008 Fortis International Challenge (Malaysia; with Kim Hyung-tae)

== Results in major championships ==
Tournament	2009	2010	2011	2012	2013	2014	2015
Masters Tournament				T37		CUT	T33
U.S. Open	CUT		T42	CUT	CUT		
The Open Championship			CUT	T64			
PGA Championship				T54	CUT		64

Did not play

CUT = missed the half-way cut
"T" = tied for place

=== Summary ===
Tournament	Wins	2nd	3rd	Top-5	Top-10	Top-25	Events	Cuts made
Masters Tournament	0	0	0	0	0	0	3	2
U.S. Open	0	0	0	0	0	0	4	1
The Open Championship	0	0	0	0	0	0	2	1
PGA Championship	0	0	0	0	0	0	3	2
Totals	0	0	0	0	0	0	12	6

- Most consecutive cuts made – 2 (twice, current)
- Longest streak of top-10s – 0

== Results in The Players Championship ==
Tournament	2012	2013	2014	2015
The Players Championship	CUT	T33	68	T30

CUT = missed the halfway cut
"T" indicates a tie for a place

== Results in World Golf Championships ==
Results not in chronological order before 2015.

Tournament	2012	2013	2014	2015
Championship	71			T46
Match Play	QF			
Invitational	66	T53		T63
Champions				

Top 10
Did not play

QF, R16, R32, R64 = Round in which player lost in match play
"T" = tied

== Team appearances ==
- World Cup (representing South Korea): 2008, 2013
- Royal Trophy (representing Asia): 2012 (winners)
- Presidents Cup (representing the International team): 2015

== See also ==
- 2011 PGA Tour Qualifying School graduates
- 2018 Web.com Tour Finals graduates
