= Hwang Inn-choon =

South Korean golfer

Personal information
- Nationality: South Korea
- Born: 26 September 1974 (age 52) Seoul, South Korea

Career
- Sport: Golf
- Turned professional: 2002
- Current tour: Korean Tour
- Professional wins: 5

Number of wins by tour
- Asian Tour: 1
- Other: 4

Best results in major championships
- Masters Tournament: DNP
- PGA Championship: DNP
- U.S. Open: DNP
- The Open Championship: T41: 2019

Hwang Inn-choon (Korean: 황인춘; born 26 September 1974) is a professional golfer from South Korea. He turned professional in 2002 at the age of 27.

== Career ==
Hwang plays primarily on the Korean Tour, full-time since 2003, picking up three victories in 2007 and 2008. He won his first title on the Asian Tour at the GS Caltex Maekyung Open with a playoff win over Noh Seung-yul in Seoul. The win did not count towards the Order of Merit because he did not play in the minimum number of events to get his tour card. He currently plays on the Korean Tour and plays in a select few of events on the Asian Tour. He won the 2017 Hyundai Insurance KJ Choi Invitational on the Korean Tour and in 2019 finished runner-up in the Kolon Korea Open to earn a place in the 2019 Open Championship.

== Professional wins (5) ==
=== Asian Tour wins (1) ===
No.	Date	Tournament	Winning score	Margin of victory	Runner-up
1	4 May 2008	GS Caltex Maekyung Open^{1}	−9 (71-67-73-68=279)	Playoff	(South Korea) Noh Seung-yul

^{1}Co-sanctioned by the Korean Tour

Asian Tour playoff record (1–0)

No.	Year	Tournament	Opponent	Result
1	2008	GS Caltex Maekyung Open	(South Korea) Noh Seung-yul	Won with par on first extra hole

=== Korean Tour wins (5) ===
No.	Date	Tournament	Winning score	Margin of victory	Runner(s)-up
1	9 Sep 2007	SBS Meritz Solmoro Open	−4 (69-74-70-67=280)	1 stroke	(South Korea) Choi Jin-ho
2	4 May 2008	GS Caltex Maekyung Open^{1}	−9 (71-67-73-68=279)	Playoff	(South Korea) Noh Seung-yul
3	1 Jun 2008	SBS Kumho Asiana Open	+3 (73-69-77-72=291)	1 stroke	(South Korea) Hong Soon-sang, (South Korea) Kang Sung-hoon, (South Korea) Kim Hyung-sung
4	19 Sep 2010	Korea-China Tour KEB Invitational (2nd)	−14 (67-70-67-70=274)	3 strokes	(South Korea) Kim Bi-o
5	29 Oct 2017	Hyundai Insurance KJ Choi Invitational	−11 (73-68-65-71=277)	Playoff	(South Korea) Choi Min-chel, (South Korea) Kang Sung-hoon

^{1}Co-sanctioned by the Asian Tour

Korean Tour playoff record (2–2)

No.	Year	Tournament	Opponent(s)	Result
1	2008	GS Caltex Maekyung Open	(South Korea) Noh Seung-yul	Won with par on first extra hole
2	2009	SBS Johnnie Walker Blue Label Open	(South Korea) Bae Sang-moon, (South Korea) Kim Dae-sub, (South Korea) Maeng Dong-seop	Maeng won with birdie on first extra hole
3	2017	Hyundai Insurance KJ Choi Invitational	(South Korea) Choi Min-chel, (South Korea) Kang Sung-hoon	Won with par on fourth extra hole Choi eliminated by par on second hole
4	2022	Bodyfriend Phantom Rovo Gunsan CC Open	(South Korea) Ham Jeong-woo, (South Korea) Seo Yo-seop	Seo won with birdie on third extra hole

== Results in major championships ==
Tournament	2019
Masters Tournament	
PGA Championship	
U.S. Open	
The Open Championship	T41

Did not play

"T" indicates a tie for a place
