= Suk Jong-yul =

South Korean professional golfer (born 1969)

Personal information
- Nationality: South Korea
- Born: 6 February 1969 (age 57)

Career
- Sport: Golf
- Turned professional: 1997
- Current tour: Japan PGA Senior Tour
- Former tours: Asian Tour; Korean Tour
- Professional wins: 4

Number of wins by tour
- Asian Tour: 1
- Other: 3

Achievements and awards
- Korean Tour Rookie of the Year: 2000

Suk Jong-yul (Korean: 석종율; born 6 February 1969) is a South Korean professional golfer.

== Career ==
Suk broke into the upper ranks of the sport at a relatively advanced age. He won the China Amateur in 2000, 2001 and 2002, and in the last of those years he also won the Ik Sam Open, a professional event in South Korea, as an amateur. He turned professional in 2003. In 2006 he won the Asian Tour's GS Caltex Maekyung Open in his home country.

== Professional wins (4) ==
=== Asian Tour wins (1) ===
No.	Date	Tournament	Winning score	Margin of victory	Runner-up
1	30 Apr 2006	GS Caltex Maekyung Open^{1}	−17 (67-69-68-67=271)	1 stroke	(United States) Bryan Saltus

^{1}Co-sanctioned by the Korean Tour

=== Korean Tour wins (2) ===
No.	Date	Tournament	Winning score	Margin of victory	Runner-up
1	16 Nov 2002	Iksan Open	−15 (66-65-70-72=273)	Playoff	(South Korea) Choi Sang-ho
2	30 Apr 2006	GS Caltex Maekyung Open^{1}	−17 (67-69-68-67=271)	1 stroke	(United States) Bryan Saltus

^{1}Co-sanctioned by the Asian Tour

Korean Tour playoff record (1–2)

No.	Year	Tournament	Opponent(s)	Result
1	2002	Iksan Open	(South Korea) Choi Sang-ho	Won with birdie on third extra hole
2	2006	Pocari Energy Open	(United States) Han Lee, (South Korea) Kim Kyung-tae (a)	Kim won with birdie on second extra hole Suk eliminated by birdie on first hole
3	2008	NH NongHyup KPGA Championship	(Australia) Andrew McKenzie, (South Korea) Park Sang-hyun	McKenzie won with birdie on first extra hole

=== Japan PGA Senior Tour wins (2) ===
No.	Date	Tournament	Winning score	Margin of victory	Runners-up
1	20 Nov 2019	ISPS Handa Cup Philanthropy Senior Tournament	−9 (66-69=135)	1 stroke	(Japan) Katsumi Kubo, (Japan) Kiyoshi Murota
2	13 Oct 2024	Trust Group Cup Sasebo Senior Open	−14 (64-66=130)	3 strokes	(Thailand) Prayad Marksaeng
