= Ballantine's Championship =

The Championship at Laguna National
Tournament information
- Location: Singapore
- Established: 2008
- Courses: Laguna National Golf & Country Club
- Par: 72
- Length: 7,206 yards (6,589 m)
- Tours: European Tour; Asian Tour; Korean Tour
- Format: Stroke play
- Prize fund: US$1,500,000
- Month played: May
- Final year: 2014

Tournament record score
- Aggregate: 264 Graeme McDowell (2008); 264 Jeev Milkha Singh (2008)
- To par: −24 as above

Final champion
- (Chile) Felipe Aguilar
- Location in Singapore

The Ballantine's Championship (known as The Championship at Laguna National in its final year) was a European Tour golf tournament which was played from 2008 to 2014. It was the first European Tour event to be staged in South Korea.

From 2008 to 2010, the tournament was played at Pinx Golf Club on the island of Jeju. From 2011 to 2013, the tournament was played at Blackstone Golf Club. In 2014, the event has moved to Laguna National Golf & CC in Singapore and titled as The Championship at Laguna National.

The tournament was announced in July 2007 by the European Tour in partnership with the Korean PGA, marking a continuation of the European Tour's expansion into Asia. The Asian Tour, which had not been offered the co-sanctioning rights to which it felt it was entitled, responded by calling the event an "invasive" action that "colonised" Asia in "blatant disregard" of the "principles of the International Federation of PGA Tours", but six months later it agreed terms to co-sanction the event. The prize fund in the first year was €2 million (circa US$2.9 million).

== Winners ==
Year	Tours (Note: ASA − Asian Tour; EUR − European Tour; KOR − Korean Tour.)	Winner	Score	To par	Margin of victory	Runner(s)-up
The Championship at Laguna National
2014	ASA, EUR	(Chile) Felipe Aguilar	266	−22	1 stroke	(Denmark) Anders Hansen (United States) David Lipsky
Ballantine's Championship
2013	ASA, EUR, KOR	(Australia) Brett Rumford	277	−11	Playoff (Note: Rumford won with eagle on first extra hole)	(Australia) Marcus Fraser (Scotland) Peter Whiteford
2012	ASA, EUR, KOR	(Austria) Bernd Wiesberger	270	−18	5 strokes	(Scotland) Richie Ramsay
2011	ASA, EUR, KOR	(England) Lee Westwood	276	−12	1 stroke	(Spain) Miguel Ángel Jiménez
2010	ASA, EUR, KOR	(Australia) Marcus Fraser	204 (Note: Shortened to 54 holes due to weather.)	−12	4 strokes	(Northern Ireland) Gareth Maybin (Australia) Brett Rumford
2009	ASA, EUR, KOR	(Thailand) Thongchai Jaidee	284	−4	Playoff (Note: Jaidee won with birdie on first extra hole)	(Spain) Gonzalo Fernández-Castaño (South Korea) Kang Sung-hoon
2008	ASA, EUR, KOR	(Northern Ireland) Graeme McDowell	264	−24	Playoff (Note: McDowell won with birdie on third extra hole)	(India) Jeev Milkha Singh

== See also ==
- Korea Open (golf)
- World Classic Championship
