= Rick Kulacz =

Australian professional golfer

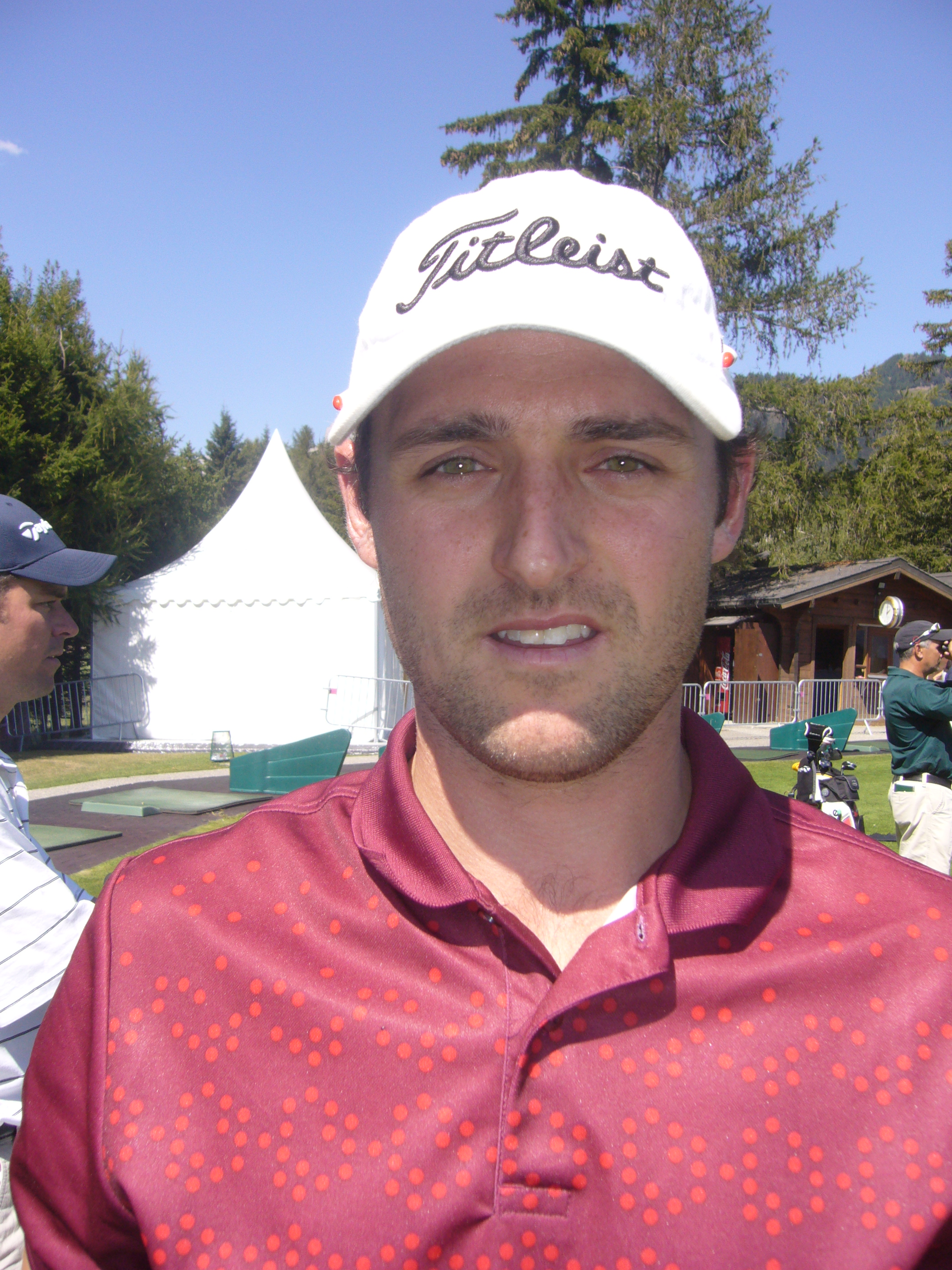

Personal information
- Nationality: Australia
- Born: 27 June 1985 (age 41)
- Height: 1.75 m (5 ft 9 in)
- Weight: 73 kg (161 lb; 11.5 st)

Career
- Sport: Golf
- Turned professional: 2007
- Current tours: PGA Tour of Australasia; Asian Tour
- Former tour: European Tour
- Professional wins: 3

Number of wins by tour
- Asian Tour: 2
- Other: 1

Best results in major championships
- Masters Tournament: DNP
- PGA Championship: DNP
- U.S. Open: DNP
- The Open Championship: CUT: 2011

Rick Kulacz (born 27 June 1985) is an Australian professional golfer.

== Career ==
Kulacz turned professional in 2007, he has played on the PGA Tour of Australasia, Asian Tour, and European Tour. He has won twice on the Asian Tour. He obtained full playing rights on the European Tour via the 2009 Qualifying School, where he sunk a putt in excess of 50 feet on his final hole of regulation play to gain full playing rights by 1 stroke.

Kulacz qualified for the 2011 Open Championship in dramatic fashion by taking the third and final spot in the Australasia International Qualifier in a playoff against Stephen Leaney at Kingston Heath Golf Club, Melbourne, Australia.

== Amateur wins ==
- 2001 Australian Boys' Amateur
- 2007 Scratch Players Championship

== Professional wins (3) ==
=== Asian Tour wins (2) ===
No.	Date	Tournament	Winning score	Margin of victory	Runner-up
1	24 Aug 2008	Brunei Open	−13 (68-66-67-70=271)	Playoff	(Taiwan) Lu Wen-teh
2	8 Aug 2009	Worldwide Holdings Selangor Masters	−11 (68-71-71-63=273)	1 stroke	(Thailand) Kiradech Aphibarnrat

Asian Tour playoff record (1–0)

No.	Year	Tournament	Opponent	Result
1	2008	Brunei Open	(Taiwan) Lu Wen-teh	Won with birdie on first extra hole

=== Von Nida Tour wins (1) ===
No.	Date	Tournament	Winning score	Margin of victory	Runner-up
1	12 Nov 2006	Proton New South Wales Open (as an amateur)	−10 (67-71-67-65=270)	Playoff	(Australia) Tony McFadyean

== Team appearances ==
Amateur

- Nomura Cup (representing Australia): 2007 (winners)
- Sloan Morpeth Trophy (representing Australia): 2007

== See also ==
- 2009 European Tour Qualifying School graduates
