= Hana Bank Vietnam Masters =

Professional golf tournament on the Asian Tour

Tournament information
- Location: Ho Chi Minh City, Vietnam
- Established: 2007
- Courses: Vietnam Golf and Country Club
- Par: 72
- Length: 6,950 yards (6,360 m)
- Tour: Asian Tour
- Format: Stroke play
- Prize fund: US$500,000
- Month played: December
- Final year: 2008

Tournament record score
- Aggregate: 273 Rhys Davies (2008); 273 Andrew Dodt (2008); 273 Thongchai Jaide (2008)
- To par: −15 as above

Final champion
- (Thailand) Thongchai Jaidee
- Location in Vietnam

The Hana Bank Vietnam Masters was a professional golf tournament on the Asian Tour. It was played for the first time in November 2007 at the Phoenix Golf Resort in Vietnam, with a prize fund of US$500,000. In the second year it was played at the Vietnam Golf and Country Club, the nearest golf course to Ho Chi Minh City.

== Winners ==
Year	Winner	Score	To par	Margin of victory	Runners-up
2008	(Thailand) Thongchai Jaidee	273	−15	Playoff	(Wales) Rhys Davies (Australia) Andrew Dodt
2007	(Thailand) Chapchai Nirat	276	−12	2 strokes	(England) Simon Griffiths (Thailand) Chawalit Plaphol
