= Motorola International Bintan =

Golf tournament

Tournament information
- Location: Bintan, Indonesia
- Established: 2007
- Course: Ria Bintan Golf Club
- Par: 72
- Length: 7,032 yards (6,430 m)
- Tour: Asian Tour
- Format: Stroke play
- Prize fund: US$350,000
- Month played: March
- Final year: 2007

Tournament record score
- Aggregate: 274 Jason Knutzon (2007)
- To par: −14 as above

Final champion
- (United States) Jason Knutzon
- Location in Indonesia

The Motorola International Bintan was an Asian Tour men's professional golf tournament that was played from 22 to 25 March 2007. It was one of three tournaments in Indonesia on the 2007 Asian Tour schedule, two of which were new. It took place at the Gary Player-designed Ria Bintan Golf Club on the island of Bintan, which is a 55-minute ferry ride from Singapore. The prize fund was US$350,000.

== Winners ==
Year	Winner	Score	To par	Margin of victory	Runner-up	Ref.
2007	(United States) Jason Knutzon	274	−14	1 stroke	(Australia) Peter Fowler	
