= Jason Knutzon =

American professional golfer

Personal information
- Nationality: United States
- Born: January 24, 1976 (age 50) Lubbock, Texas, U.S.
- Height: 5 ft 11 in (1.80 m)
- Weight: 160 lb (73 kg; 11 st)

Career
- Sport: Golf
- College: Iowa State University
- Turned professional: 1999
- Current tour: Asian Tour
- Former tours: European Tour; Nationwide Tour
- Professional wins: 2

Number of wins by tour
- Asian Tour: 2

Best results in major championships
- Masters Tournament: DNP
- PGA Championship: DNP
- U.S. Open: CUT: 2003
- The Open Championship: CUT: 2011

Jason Knutzon (born January 24, 1976) is an American professional golfer.

== Career ==
As of 2011 Knutzon is a member of the Asian Tour and the European Tour. He is one of few Americans who mainly play on the Asian Tour. Knutzon has been to PGA Tour Qualifying School once. He entered in 2000 but failed to earn a tour card. He played on the Nationwide Tour in 2001 but he only made 7 of 19 cuts and was unable to retain his card.

Knutzon joined the Asian Tour in 2003. In his rookie season he finished in 31st place on the Order of Merit and recorded three top 10 finishes.

In 2004 Knutzon picked up his first professional win in China at the Macau Open. Pádraig Harrington participated in the tournament and finished 3 strokes behind. He ended up finishing in a career best 20th place on the Order of Merit.

Knutzon picked up his second win in Indonesia at the Motorola International Bintan in 2007.

Knutzon played in 2005 and 2008 at the John Deere Classic. He finished tied for 58th place and earned $8,920 in 2005. Knutzon was a Monday qualifier for the tournament in 2005. Knutzon has two major appearances, the 2003 U.S. Open and the 2011 Open Championship.

== Amateur wins ==
- 1998 Iowa Masters, Fort Dodge Amateur, Northwest Amateur

== Professional wins (2) ==
=== Asian Tour wins (2) ===
No.	Date	Tournament	Winning score	Margin of victory	Runner-up
1	May 9, 2004	Macau Open	−16 (65-68-68-67=268)	1 stroke	(Thailand) Thaworn Wiratchant
2	Mar 25, 2007	Motorola International Bintan	−14 (69-71-68-66=274)	1 stroke	(Australia) Peter Fowler

== Results in major championships ==
Tournament	2003	2004	2005	2006	2007	2008	2009	2010	2011
U.S. Open	CUT								
The Open Championship									CUT

Did not play

CUT = missed the half-way cut
"T" = tied
Note: Knutzon never played in the Masters Tournament or the PGA Championship.

== Results in World Golf Championships ==
Tournament	2014
Match Play	
Championship	
Invitational	
Champions	72

Did not play

== See also ==
- 2010 European Tour Qualifying School graduates
- 2013 European Tour Qualifying School graduates
- 2015 European Tour Qualifying School graduates
