= 2008 Asian Tour =

Golf tour season

2008 Asian Tour season
- Duration: 7 February 2008 – 21 December 2008
- Number of official events: 29 (Note: One further tournament was scheduled but was cancelled.)
- Most wins: (New Zealand) Mark Brown (2) (Taiwan) Lin Wen-tang (2) (Thailand) Thongchai Jaidee (2)
- Order of Merit: (India) Jeev Milkha Singh
- Players' Player of the Year: (India) Jeev Milkha Singh
- Rookie of the Year: (South Korea) Noh Seung-yul

The 2008 Asian Tour was the 14th season of the modern Asian Tour (formerly the Asian PGA Tour), the main professional golf tour in Asia (outside of Japan) since it was established in 1995.

== Schedule ==
The following table lists official events during the 2008 season.

| Date | Tournament | Host country | Purse (US$) | Winner (Note: The number in brackets after each winner's name is the number of Asian Tour events they had won up to and including that tournament. This information is only shown for Asian Tour members.) | OWGR points | Other tours (Note: AFR − Sunshine Tour; ANZ − PGA Tour of Australasia; EUR − European Tour; JPN − Japan Golf Tour; KOR − Korean Tour.) | Notes |
|---|---|---|---|---|---|---|---|
| 10 Feb | Emaar-MGF Indian Masters | India | 2,500,000 | (India) Shiv Chawrasia (1) | 26 | EUR | New tournament |
| ~~17 Feb~~ | Singapore Masters | Singapore | – | Cancelled | – | EUR | |
| 17 Feb | Enjoy Jakarta Astro Indonesia Open | Indonesia | 1,200,000 | (Chile) Felipe Aguilar (n/a) | 20 | EUR | |
| 23 Feb | SAIL Open Golf Championship | India | 400,000 | (New Zealand) Mark Brown (1) | 14 | | New tournament |
| 4 Mar | Johnnie Walker Classic | India | £1,250,000 | (New Zealand) Mark Brown (2) | 38 | ANZ, EUR | |
| 9 Mar | Maybank Malaysian Open | Malaysia | 2,000,000 | (India) Arjun Atwal (7) | 24 | EUR | |
| 16 Mar | Ballantine's Championship | South Korea | €2,000,000 | (Northern Ireland) Graeme McDowell (1) | 28 | EUR, KOR | New tournament |
| 23 Mar | Asian Tour International | Thailand | 300,000 | (Taiwan) Lin Wen-tang (3) | 14 | | New tournament |
| 6 Apr | Philippine Open | Philippines | 300,000 | (Philippines) Angelo Que (2) | 14 | | |
| 20 Apr | Volvo China Open | China | 2,200,000 | (Republic of Ireland) Damien McGrane (n/a) | 20 | EUR | |
| 27 Apr | BMW Asian Open | China | 2,300,000 | (Northern Ireland) Darren Clarke (n/a) | 32 | EUR | |
| 4 May | GS Caltex Maekyung Open | South Korea | ₩600,000,000 | (South Korea) Hwang Inn-choon (1) | 14 | KOR | |
| 11 May | Pine Valley Beijing Open | China | 1,000,000 | (Japan) Hiroyuki Fujita (n/a) | 16 | JPN | |
| 8 Jun | Bangkok Airways Open | Thailand | 300,000 | (Thailand) Thaworn Wiratchant (10) | 14 | | |
| 29 Jun | Singha Thailand PGA Championship | Thailand | 500,000 | (South Korea) Mo Joong-kyung (2) | 14 | | New tournament |
| 9 Aug | Worldwide Selangor Masters | Malaysia | 310,000 | (Malaysia) Ben Leong (1) | 14 | | New tournament |
| 24 Aug | Brunei Open | Brunei | 300,000 | (Australia) Rick Kulacz (1) | 14 | | |
| 31 Aug | Pertamina Indonesia President Invitational | Indonesia | 350,000 | (Australia) Scott Hend (1) | 14 | | |
| 21 Sep | Mercuries Taiwan Masters | Taiwan | 500,000 | (Taiwan) Lu Wen-teh (5) | 14 | | |
| 28 Sep | Asia-Pacific Panasonic Open | Japan | 1,850,000 | (Japan) Hideto Tanihara (n/a) | 20 | JPN | New tournament |
| 5 Oct | Kolon-Hana Bank Korea Open | South Korea | ₩1,000,000,000 | (South Korea) Bae Sang-moon (2) | 18 | KOR | |
| 12 Oct | Hero Honda Indian Open | India | 1,000,000 | (China) Liang Wenchong (2) | 14 | | |
| 19 Oct | Midea China Classic | China | 500,000 | (South Korea) Noh Seung-yul (1) | 14 | | |
| 26 Oct | Macau Open | Macau | 500,000 | (Australia) David Gleeson (2) | 14 | | |
| 2 Nov | Iskandar Johor Open | Malaysia | 500,000 | (South Africa) Retief Goosen (n/a) | 14 | | |
| 16 Nov | Barclays Singapore Open | Singapore | 5,000,000 | (India) Jeev Milkha Singh (6) | 38 | | |
| 23 Nov | UBS Hong Kong Open | Hong Kong | 2,250,000 | (Taiwan) Lin Wen-tang (4) | 32 | EUR | |
| 7 Dec | Hana Bank Vietnam Masters | Vietnam | 500,000 | (Thailand) Thongchai Jaidee (9) | 14 | | |
| 14 Dec | Johnnie Walker Cambodian Open | Cambodia | 300,000 | (Thailand) Thongchai Jaidee (10) | 14 | | |
| 21 Dec | Volvo Masters of Asia | Thailand | 750,000 | (Singapore) Lam Chih Bing (1) | 20 | | |

=== Unofficial events ===
The following events were sanctioned by the Asian Tour, but did not carry official money, nor were wins official.

| Date | Tournament | Host country | Purse ($) | Winner | OWGR points | Other tours | Notes |
|---|---|---|---|---|---|---|---|
| 9 Nov | HSBC Champions | China | 5,000,000 | (Spain) Sergio García | 52 | AFR, (Note: Sunshine Tour unofficial event) ANZ, (Note: PGA Tour of Australasia unofficial event) EUR | Limited-field event |

== Order of Merit ==
The Order of Merit was titled as the UBS Order of Merit and was based on prize money won during the season, calculated in U.S. dollars.

| Position | Player | Prize money ($) |
|---|---|---|
| 1 | (India) Jeev Milkha Singh | 1,452,702 |
| 2 | (Taiwan) Lin Wen-tang | 844,735 |
| 3 | (New Zealand) Mark Brown | 778,038 |
| 4 | (China) Liang Wenchong | 521,428 |
| 5 | (Australia) David Gleeson | 483,121 |

== Awards ==
| Award | Winner | Ref. |
|---|---|---|
| Players' Player of the Year | (India) Jeev Milkha Singh | |
| Rookie of the Year | (South Korea) Noh Seung-yul | |
