= 2013 Korean Tour =

Golf tour season

2013 Korean Tour season
- Duration: 25 April 2013 – 1 November 2013
- Number of official events: 14
- Most wins: (South Korea) Kang Sung-hoon (2)
- Order of Merit: (South Korea) Ryu Hyun-woo
- Player of the Year: (South Korea) Ryu Hyun-woo
- Rookie of the Year: (South Korea) Song Young-han

The 2013 Korean Tour was the 36th season on the Korean Tour, the main professional golf tour in South Korea since it was formed in 1978.

== Schedule ==
The following table lists official events during the 2013 season.

Date	Tournament	Location	Purse (₩)	Winner (Note: The number in brackets after each winner's name is the number of Korean Tour events they had won up to and including that tournament. This information is only shown for Korean Tour members.)	OWGR points	Other tours (Note: ASA − Asian Tour; EUR − European Tour; ONE − OneAsia Tour.)	Notes
28 Apr	Ballantine's Championship	Gyeonggi	€2,205,000	(Australia) Brett Rumford (n/a)	34	ASA, EUR	
12 May	GS Caltex Maekyung Open	Gyeonggi	1,000,000,000	(South Korea) Ryu Hyun-woo (2)	8	ONE	
19 May	SK Telecom Open	Jeju	900,000,000	(Australia) Matthew Griffin (2)	6	ONE	
26 May	Happiness Kwangju Bank Open	South Jeolla	500,000,000	(South Korea) Kang Kyung-nam (10)	6		New tournament
2 Jun	Gunsan CC Open	North Jeolla	300,000,000	(South Korea) Lee Soo-min (a) (1)	6		
4 Aug	Bosung CC Classic	South Jeolla	300,000,000	(South Korea) Kim Tae-hoon (1)	6		New tournament
11 Aug	SolaSeaDo-Pine Beach Open	South Jeolla	300,000,000	(South Korea) Hong Soon-sang (5)	6		New tournament
18 Aug	Dongchon KPGA Championship	North Chungcheong	500,000,000	(South Korea) Kim Hyung-tae (5)	6		
15 Sep	Dongbu Insurance Promy Open	Gangwon	400,000,000	(South Korea) Lee Chang-woo (a) (1)	6		
29 Sep	Shinhan Donghae Open	Gyeonggi	1,000,000,000	(South Korea) Bae Sang-moon (8)	6		
6 Oct	Munsingwear Matchplay Championship	Gangwon	600,000,000	(South Korea) Kim Do-hoon (2)	6		
13 Oct	CJ Invitational	Gyeonggi	US$750,000	(South Korea) Kang Sung-hoon (3)	14	ASA	
20 Oct	Kolon Korea Open	South Chungcheong	1,000,000,000	(South Korea) Kang Sung-hoon (4)	14	ONE	
1 Nov	Herald KYJ Tour Championship	Jeju	300,000,000	(South Korea) Hur In-hoi (2)	6		

== Order of Merit ==
The Order of Merit was titled as the Ballantine's Points and was based on tournament results during the season, calculated using a points-based system.

Position	Player	Points
1	(South Korea) Ryu Hyun-woo	3,555
2	(South Korea) Kim Hyung-tae	3,310
3	(South Korea) Kim Tae-hoon	3,215
4	(South Korea) Kim Do-hoon	3,160
T5	(South Korea) Kang Sung-hoon	2,540
T5	(South Korea) Lee Sang-hee	2,540

== Awards ==
Award	Winner	Ref.
Player of the Year (Grand Prize Award)	(South Korea) Ryu Hyun-woo	
Rookie of the Year (Myeong-chul Award)	(South Korea) Song Young-han	
