= Simon Griffiths =

English professional golfer (born 1973)

Personal information
- Nationality: England
- Born: 15 January 1973 (age 53) Chertsey, England
- Height: 5 ft 10 in (1.78 m)

Career
- Sport: Golf
- Turned professional: 1996
- Current tour: European Senior Tour
- Former tours: European Tour; Asian Tour; Challenge Tour; PGA Tour China; PGA EuroPro Tour
- Professional wins: 3

Number of wins by tour
- European Senior Tour: 3

Best results in major championships
- Masters Tournament: DNP
- PGA Championship: DNP
- U.S. Open: CUT: 2014
- The Open Championship: CUT: 1993

Achievements and awards
- European Senior Tour Rookie of the Year: 2024

Simon Griffiths (born 15 January 1973) is an English professional golfer who played on the Asian Tour 2006–2017 and was runner-up at the 2007 Hana Bank Vietnam Masters and the 2008 Volvo China Open. In 2024, he joined the European Senior Tour where he was Rookie of the Year.

== Professional career ==
Griffiths turned professional in 1996 and attended European Tour Q-School 15 times between 1997 and 2016 without securing a card. Instead he played on the Asian Tour between 2006 and 2017, where his best finishes were runner-ups at the 2007 Hana Bank Vietnam Masters and the 2008 Volvo China Open, a European Tour co-sanctioned event. In 2015, he played on the Challenge Tour where he recorded three top-10 finishes.

He played in the 2014 U.S. Open after coming through the sectional qualifier in England, but did not make the cut. Griffiths finished third at the qualifier in Wales to earn a spot at the 2023 Senior Open Championship, but did not make the cut.

In 2024, Griffiths tied second in Q-School to join the European Senior Tour, where he recorded five top-5 finishes including a lost playoff at the MCB Tour Championship Mauritius and a win at the Farmfoods European Senior Masters in Spain, to secure the 2024 European Senior Tour Rookie of the Year title. He finished 4th in the season rankings, which earned him a start at the Trophy Hassan II on the PGA Tour Champions, where he shared the lead after the first round with Steven Alker. In 2025 he won the season opening event, the Staysure Marbella Legends.

== Amateur wins ==
- 2003 Sunningdale Foursomes (with Ross Fisher)
- 2004 Sunningdale Foursomes (with Ross Fisher)

== Professional wins (3) ==
=== European Senior Tour wins (3) ===
No.	Date	Tournament	Winning score	Margin of victory	Runner-up
1	10 Nov 2024	Farmfoods European Senior Masters	−17 (64-70-68=202)	2 strokes	(England) Van Phillips
2	14 Feb 2025	Staysure Marbella Legends	−15 (65-68-68=201)	2 strokes	(Australia) Scott Hend
3	14 Jun 2026	Costa Navarino Legends Tour Trophy	−12 (67-70-67=204)	3 strokes	(Scotland) David Drysdale

European Senior Tour playoff record (0–1)

No.	Year	Tournament	Opponent	Result
1	2024	MCB Tour Championship	(England) Peter Baker	Lost to birdie on third extra hole
