= 2020 Korean Tour =

Golf tour season

2020 Korean Tour season
- Duration: 2 July 2020 – 8 November 2020
- Number of official events: 11 (Note: One further tournament was scheduled but was cancelled.)
- Most wins: (South Korea) Kim Han-byeol (2)
- Order of Merit: (South Korea) Kim Tae-hoon
- Player of the Year: (South Korea) Kim Tae-hoon
- Rookie of the Year: (Australia) Won Joon Lee

The 2020 Korean Tour was the 43rd season on the Korean Tour, the main professional golf tour in South Korea since it was formed in 1978.

== Schedule ==
The following table lists official events during the 2020 season.

Date	Tournament	Location	Purse (₩)	Winner (Note: The number in brackets after each winner's name is the number of Korean Tour events they had won up to and including that tournament. This information is only shown for Korean Tour members.)	OWGR points	Other tours (Note: ASA − Asian Tour; JPN − Japan Golf Tour.)	Notes
~~28 Jun~~	Kolon Korea Open	South Chungcheong	–	Cancelled	–	ASA	
5 Jul	Woosung Construction Aramir CC Busan Gyeongnam Open	South Gyeongsang	500,000,000	(South Korea) Lee Ji-hoon (2)	9		
12 Jul	KPGA Gunsan CC Open	North Jeolla	500,000,000	(South Korea) Tom Kim (1)	9		
19 Jul	KPGA Open	South Chungcheong	500,000,000	(South Korea) Lee Soo-min (4)	9		New tournament
9 Aug	KPGA Championship	South Gyeongsang	1,000,000,000	(South Korea) Kim Seong-hyeon (1)	9		
23 Aug; ~~3 May~~	GS Caltex Maekyung Open	Gangwon	1,000,000,000	(South Korea) Lee Tae-hee (4)	4	~~ASA~~	
30 Aug	Hazzys Golf KPGA Open	Gyeonggi	500,000,000	(South Korea) Kim Han-byeol (1)	9		New tournament
13 Sep	Shinhan Donghae Open	Gyeonggi	1,400,000,000	(South Korea) Kim Han-byeol (2)	9	~~ASA, JPN~~	
27 Sep	Hyundai Insurance KJ Choi Invitational	Gyeonggi	1,000,000,000	(South Korea) Lee Chang-woo (2)	9		
11 Oct	Genesis Championship	Gyeonggi	1,500,000,000	(South Korea) Kim Tae-hoon (4)	9		
25 Oct	Bizplay Electronic Times Open	Jeju	500,000,000	(Australia) Won Joon Lee (2)	9		New tournament
8 Nov	LG Signature Players Championship	Gyeonggi	1,000,000,000	(United States) Seungsu Han (1)	9		New tournament

== Order of Merit ==
The Order of Merit was titled as the Genesis Points and was based on tournament results during the season, calculated using a points-based system. The leading player on the Order of Merit earned status to play on the 2021 European Tour.

Position	Player	Points	Status earned
1	(South Korea) Kim Tae-hoon	3,252	Promoted to European Tour
2	(South Korea) Kim Han-byeol	3,039	
3	(South Korea) Lee Jae-kyeong	3,026	
4	(South Korea) Lee Chang-woo	2,707	
5	(South Korea) Moon Kyong-jun	2,631	

== Awards ==
Award	Winner	Ref.
Player of the Year (Grand Prize Award)	(South Korea) Kim Tae-hoon	
Rookie of the Year (Myeong-chul Award)	(Australia) Won Joon Lee	
