= Scratch Players Championship =

Tournament information
- Location: Various (U.S.)
- Established: 2000
- Format: Stroke play
- Month played: August
- Final year: 2010

Final champion
- Romain Wattel

The Scratch Players Championship (SPC) was an annual amateur golf tournament held from 2000 to 2010. It was a 72-hole stroke play event with two cuts. The Scratch Players Group ranked the tournament among the top 20 world amateur events in 2010. The World Amateur Golf Ranking distinguished it as a "category A" tournament, placing it amidst the top 30 men's amateur tournaments in the world. In 2007 and 2009, the SPC was among the top 25 in world amateur field.

The tournament was discontinued when the USGA announced the U.S. Amateur would occur one week earlier in 2012 and beyond. The SPC was scheduled in this time slot and was too close to the U.S. Amateur. The tournament's director was also heavily occupied with administering the Scratch Players World Amateur Ranking.

At every golf course that hosted the SPC, it holds the amateur tournament record for winning and average score. This record holds for amateurs and professionals every year except 2004–2006. All SPC Champions turned professional. From 2006, players hailed from at least 15 countries.

== Winners ==
Year	Winner	Course	Location
2010	Romain Wattel	Canterwood Golf & Country Club	Gig Harbor, Washington
2009	Dodge Kemmer	Quail Creek Golf & Country Club	Oklahoma City, Oklahoma
2008	No tournament		
2007	Rick Kulacz	Del Rio Country Club	Modesto, California
2006	Rhys Davies	Somerby Golf Club	Byron, Minnesota
2005	Andres Gonzales	Bayonet Golf Course	Seaside, California
2004	Spencer Levin	Bayonet Golf Course	Seaside, California
2003	Andrew Dresser	Stevinson Ranch Golf Club	Stevinson, California
2002	Eddie Heinen	Diablo Grande Ranch and Diablo Grande Legends West	Patterson, California
2001	No tournament due to September 11 attacks		
2000	Josh Levin	The Ridge Golf Club	Auburn, California
