= 2007 Asian Tour =

Golf tour season

2007 Asian Tour season
- Duration: 18 January 2007 – 9 December 2007
- Number of official events: 28
- Most wins: (Taiwan) Lu Wen-teh (2) (Thailand) Chapchai Nirat (2)
- Order of Merit: (China) Liang Wenchong
- Players' Player of the Year: (China) Liang Wenchong
- Rookie of the Year: (Australia) Scott Hend

The 2007 Asian Tour was the 13th season of the modern Asian Tour (formerly the Asian PGA Tour), the main professional golf tour in Asia (outside of Japan) since it was established in 1995.

== Schedule ==
The following table lists official events during the 2007 season.

Date	Tournament	Host country	Purse (US$)	Winner (Note: The number in brackets after each winner's name is the number of Asian Tour events they had won up to and including that tournament. This information is only shown for Asian Tour members.)	OWGR points	Other tours (Note: AFR − Sunshine Tour; ANZ − PGA Tour of Australasia; EUR − European Tour; KOR − Korean Tour.)	Notes
21 Jan	Pakistan Open	Pakistan	300,000	(Malaysia) Airil Rizman (1)	14		
28 Jan	Commercialbank Qatar Masters	Qatar	2,200,000	(South Africa) Retief Goosen (n/a)	48	EUR	
4 Feb	Philippine Open	Philippines	300,000	(Philippines) Frankie Miñoza (1)	14		
11 Feb	Maybank Malaysian Open	Malaysia	1,290,000	(Sweden) Peter Hedblom (n/a)	26	EUR	
18 Feb	Enjoy Jakarta Astro Indonesia Open	Indonesia	1,000,000	(Finland) Mikko Ilonen (n/a)	20	EUR	
4 Mar	Johnnie Walker Classic	Thailand	£1,250,000	(South Africa) Anton Haig (2)	40	ANZ, EUR	
11 Mar	Clariden Leu Singapore Masters	Singapore	1,100,000	(China) Liang Wenchong (1)	30	EUR	
18 Mar	TCL Classic	China	1,000,000	(Thailand) Chapchai Nirat (1)	20	EUR	
25 Mar	Motorola International Bintan	Indonesia	350,000	(United States) Jason Knutzon (2)	14		New tournament
15 Apr	Volvo China Open	China	2,000,000	(Austria) Markus Brier (n/a)	20	EUR	
22 Apr	BMW Asian Open	China	2,300,000	(France) Raphaël Jacquelin (n/a)	32	EUR	
19 Apr	Pine Valley Beijing Open	China	500,000	(India) Gaurav Ghei (3)	14		New tournament
6 May	GS Caltex Maekyung Open	South Korea	₩600,000,000	(South Korea) Kim Kyung-tae (1)	14	KOR	
20 May	Macau Open	Macau	300,000	(Taiwan) Lu Wen-teh (3)	14		
27 May	SK Telecom Open	South Korea	₩600,000,000	(South Korea) Bae Sang-moon (1)	14	KOR	
10 Jun	Bangkok Airways Open	Thailand	300,000	(South Korea) Lee Sung (1)	14		New tournament
26 Aug	Iskandar Johor Open	Malaysia	300,000	(Philippines) Artemio Murakami (1)	14		New tournament
2 Sep	Brunei Open	Brunei	500,000	(Taiwan) Lin Wen-tang (2)	14		
16 Sep	Midea China Classic	China	400,000	(Thailand) Thaworn Wiratchant (9)	14		New tournament
23 Sep	Mercuries Taiwan Masters	Taiwan	500,000	(Taiwan) Lu Wen-teh (4)	14		
7 Oct	Kolon-Hana Bank Korea Open	South Korea	₩1,000,000,000	(Fiji) Vijay Singh (n/a)	14	KOR	
14 Oct	Hero Honda Indian Open	India	500,000	(India) Jyoti Randhawa (7)	14		
28 Oct	Pertamina Indonesia President Invitational	Indonesia	500,000	(Philippines) Juvic Pagunsan (1)	14		New tournament
4 Nov	Barclays Singapore Open	Singapore	4,000,000	(Argentina) Ángel Cabrera (n/a)	40		
18 Nov	UBS Hong Kong Open	Hong Kong	2,250,000	(Spain) Miguel Ángel Jiménez (n/a)	36	EUR	
25 Nov	Hana Bank Vietnam Masters	Vietnam	500,000	(Thailand) Chapchai Nirat (2)	14		New tournament
2 Dec	Johnnie Walker Cambodian Open	Cambodia	300,000	(United States) Bryan Saltus (1)	14		New tournament
9 Dec	Volvo Masters of Asia	Thailand	750,000	(Thailand) Prayad Marksaeng (6)	20		

=== Unofficial events ===
The following events were sanctioned by the Asian Tour, but did not carry official money, nor were wins official.

Date	Tournament	Host country	Purse ($)	Winner	OWGR points	Other tours	Notes
11 Nov	HSBC Champions	China	5,000,000	(United States) Phil Mickelson	52	AFR, (Note: Sunshine Tour unofficial event) ANZ, (Note: PGA Tour of Australasia unofficial event) EUR	Limited-field event

== Order of Merit ==
The Order of Merit was titled as the UBS Order of Merit and was based on prize money won during the season, calculated in U.S. dollars.

Position	Player	Prize money ($)
1	(China) Liang Wenchong	532,591
2	(Thailand) Chapchai Nirat	442,326
3	(South Africa) Anton Haig	427,685
4	(Australia) Scott Hend	363,109
5	(Thailand) Prayad Marksaeng	348,623

== Awards ==
Award	Winner	Ref.
Players' Player of the Year	(China) Liang Wenchong	
Rookie of the Year	(Australia) Scott Hend	
