= Johnnie Walker Cambodian Open =

Tournament information
- Location: Siem Reap, Cambodia
- Established: 2007
- Course: Phokeethra Country Club
- Par: 72
- Length: 7,226 yards (6,607 m)
- Tour: Asian Tour
- Format: Stroke play
- Prize fund: US$300,000
- Month played: December
- Final year: 2010

Tournament record score
- Aggregate: 264 Thongchai Jaidee (2008)
- To par: −24 as above

Final champion
- (Thailand) Thongchai Jaidee
- Location in Cambodia

The Johnnie Walker Cambodian Open was an Asian Tour golf tournament. It was played for the first time in 2007 from November 29 to December 2 at the Phokeethra Country Club in Cambodia. The purse was US$300,000. The tournament's main sponsor was Johnnie Walker. The Cambodian Open was the first professional golf tournament hosted in Cambodia.

== Winners ==
Year	Winner	Score	To par	Margin of victory	Runner-up
2010	(Thailand) Thongchai Jaidee (2)	267	−21	4 strokes	(Japan) Kenichi Kuboya
2009	(Australia) Marcus Both	279	−9	1 stroke	(Malaysia) Shaaban Hussin
2008	(Thailand) Thongchai Jaidee	264	−24	6 strokes	(Singapore) Lam Chih Bing
2007	(United States) Bryan Saltus	271	−17	3 strokes	(Australia) Adam Groom

== See also ==
- Open golf tournament
