= 2010 Korean Tour =

Golf tour season

2010 Korean Tour season
- Duration: 18 March 2010 – 14 November 2010
- Number of official events: 17
- Order of Merit: (South Korea) Kim Bi-o
- Player of the Year: (South Korea) Kim Bi-o
- Rookie of the Year: (South Korea) Kim Bi-o

The 2010 Korean Tour was the 33rd season on the Korean Tour, the main professional golf tour in South Korea since it was formed in 1978.

== Schedule ==
The following table lists official events during the 2010 season.

Date	Tournament	Location	Purse (₩)	Winner (Note: The number in brackets after each winner's name is the number of Korean Tour events they had won up to and including that tournament. This information is only shown for Korean Tour members.)	OWGR points	Other tours (Note: ASA − Asian Tour; EUR − European Tour; ONE − OneAsia Tour.)	Notes
21 Mar	Korea-China Tour KEB Invitational (1st)	China	400,000,000	(South Korea) Kim Hyung-tae (4)	n/a		
11 Apr	Tomato Savings Bank Open	Jeju	300,000,000	(South Korea) Kim Do-hoon 753 (1)	n/a		
17 Apr	Eugene Securities Open	Gyeonggi	300,000,000	(South Korea) Kang Sung-hoon (2)	n/a		New tournament
25 Apr	Ballantine's Championship	Gyeonggi	€2,200,000	(Australia) Marcus Fraser (n/a)	38	ASA, EUR	
9 May	GS Caltex Maekyung Open	Gyeonggi	800,000,000	(South Korea) Kim Dae-hyun (2)	6	ONE	
23 May	SK Telecom Open	Gyeonggi	900,000,000	(South Korea) Bae Sang-moon (7)	12	ONE	
20 Jun	Dongbu Insurance Promy Gunsan CC Open	North Jeolla	300,000,000	(South Korea) Kim Do-hoon 752 (1)	n/a		
4 Jul	J-Golf KPGA Championship	Gyeonggi	500,000,000	(South Korea) Son Joon-eob (1)	n/a		
8 Aug	Johnnie Walker Open	Jeju	300,000,000	(South Korea) Kim Bi-o (1)	n/a		
27 Aug	Lake Hills Open	Gyeonggi	300,000,000	(South Korea) Choi Jin-ho (2)	n/a		
5 Sep	Meritz Solmoro Open	Gyeonggi	500,000,000	(South Korea) Lee Seong-ho (5)	n/a		
19 Sep	Korea-China Tour KEB Invitational (2nd)	Gangwon	400,000,000	(South Korea) Hwang Inn-choon (4)	n/a		
3 Oct	Shinhan Donghae Open	Gyeonggi	800,000,000	(United States) John Huh (1)	n/a		
10 Oct	Kolon Korea Open	South Chungcheong	1,000,000,000	(South Korea) Yang Yong-eun (3)	12	ONE	
17 Oct	Hanyang Sujain-Pine Beach Open	South Jeolla	300,000,000	(South Korea) Kim Dae-sub (8)	n/a		New tournament
24 Oct	Munsingwear Championship	North Chungcheong	400,000,000	(South Korea) Kang Kyung-nam (7)	n/a		New tournament
14 Nov	Hana Tour Championship	Gangwon	300,000,000	(South Korea) Kim Wi-joong (2)	n/a		

== Order of Merit ==
The Order of Merit was titled as the Ballantine's Points and was based on tournament results during the season, calculated using a points-based system.

Position	Player	Points
1	(South Korea) Kim Bi-o	3,770
2	(South Korea) Kim Dae-hyun	3,595
3	(South Korea) Kang Kyung-nam	3,230
4	(South Korea) Son Joon-eob	2,585
5	(South Korea) Kim Dae-sub	2,275

== Awards ==
Award	Winner	Ref.
Player of the Year (Grand Prize Award)	(South Korea) Kim Bi-o	
Rookie of the Year (Myeong-chul Award)	(South Korea) Kim Bi-o	
