= Noh Seung-yul =

South Korean professional golfer (born 1991)

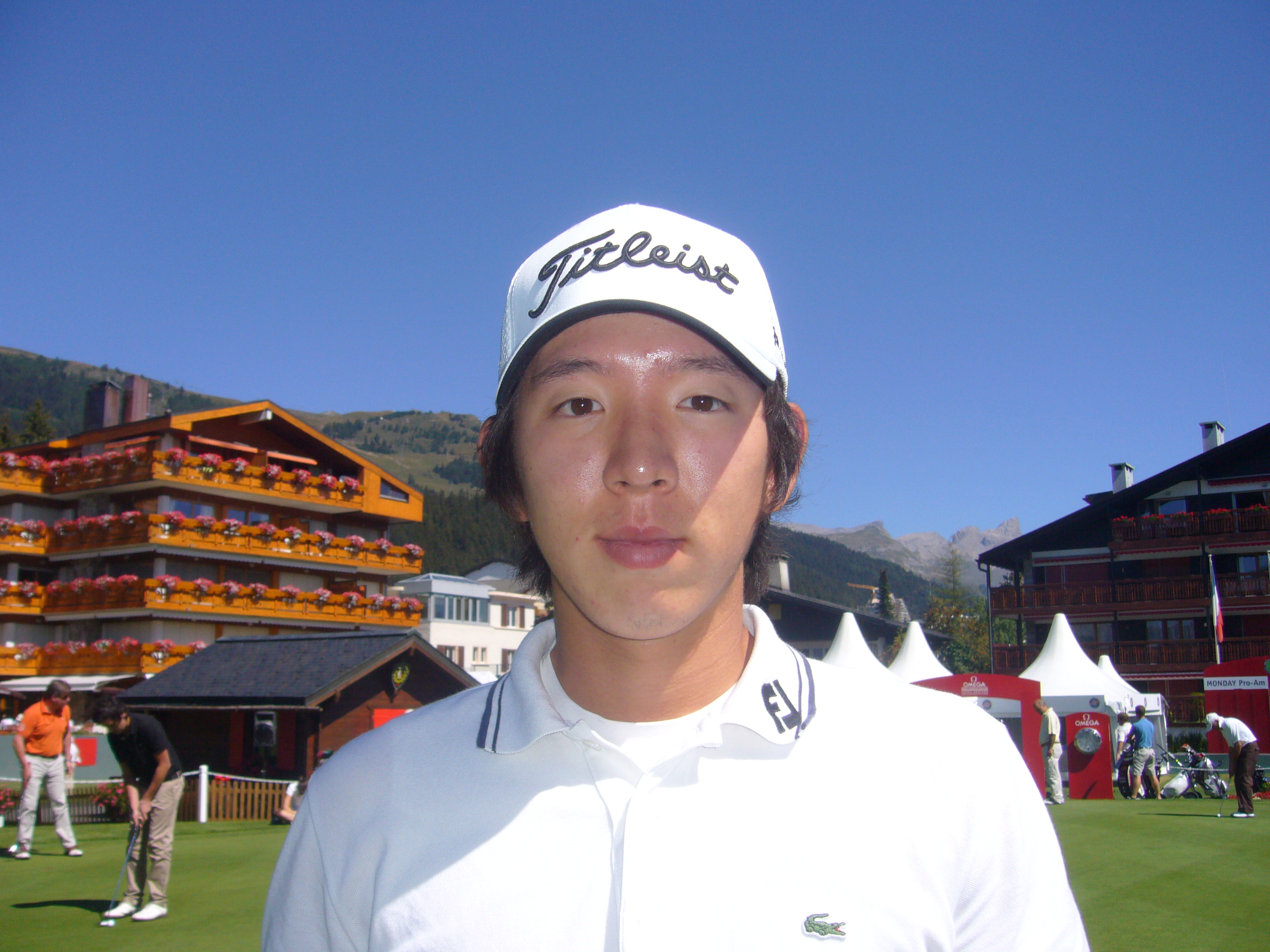

Personal information
- Nationality: South Korea
- Born: 29 May 1991 (age 35) Gangwon Province, South Korea
- Height: 6 ft 1 in (1.85 m)
- Weight: 165 lb (75 kg; 11.8 st)

Career
- Sport: Golf
- College: Korea University
- Turned professional: 2007
- Current tour: Korn Ferry Tour
- Former tours: PGA Tour; European Tour; Asian Tour
- Professional wins: 4
- Highest ranking: 61 (30 January 2011)

Number of wins by tour
- PGA Tour: 1
- European Tour: 1
- Asian Tour: 2
- Korn Ferry Tour: 1

Best results in major championships
- Masters Tournament: T38: 2015
- PGA Championship: T21: 2012
- U.S. Open: T30: 2011
- The Open Championship: T30: 2011

Achievements and awards
- Asian Tour Rookie of the Year: 2008
- Asian Tour Order of Merit winner: 2010
- Asian Tour Players' Player of the Year: 2010

Noh Seung-yul (Korean: 노승열; born 29 May 1991), or Seung-yul Noh is a South Korean professional golfer.

== Professional career ==
Noh turned professional in 2007 and successfully negotiated qualifying school for the 2008 Asian Tour. He won the Midea China Classic that season, and was named Asian Tour rookie of the year. In 2010 he won the Maybank Malaysian Open which was co-sanctioned with the European Tour. The win made him the second youngest winner (18 years, 282 days) ever on the European Tour after Danny Lee (18 years, 213 days).

He finished 2010 as the leader of the Asian Tour money list, and ranked 34th on the European Tour Order of Merit.

In December 2011, Noh finished T3 at the PGA Tour Q-School to earn his tour card for the 2012 season. This marked the first time that Noh had earned a full membership on the PGA Tour.

In 2012, he finished 49th on the PGA Tour money list and 37th in the FedEx Cup playoffs to retain his card for 2013. In 2013, he finished 153rd on the money list and missed the FedEx Cup playoffs. He played in the Web.com Tour Finals and finished fourth to regain his PGA Tour card for 2014.

On 27 April 2014, he won the Zurich Classic of New Orleans, one month before his 23rd birthday. This was his first PGA Tour victory.

In October 2017, Noh announced he would leave the PGA Tour to begin his mandatory military obligation in South Korea, just a few months after countryman Bae Sang-moon returned from his commitment.

Noh made his return to professional golf at the 2019 Shinhan Donghae Open.

== Amateur wins ==
- 2005 Korean Amateur, Korean Junior Amateur

== Professional wins (4) ==
=== PGA Tour wins (1) ===
No.	Date	Tournament	Winning score	Margin of victory	Runners-up
1	27 Apr 2014	Zurich Classic of New Orleans	−19 (65-68-65-71=269)	2 strokes	(United States) Robert Streb, (United States) Andrew Svoboda

=== European Tour wins (1) ===
No.	Date	Tournament	Winning score	Margin of victory	Runner-up
1	7 Mar 2010	Maybank Malaysian Open^{1}	−14 (69-70-67-68=274)	1 stroke	(South Korea) K. J. Choi

^{1}Co-sanctioned by the Asian Tour

=== Asian Tour wins (2) ===
No.	Date	Tournament	Winning score	Margin of victory	Runner-up
1	19 Oct 2008	Midea China Classic	−17 (66-66-67-68=267)	1 stroke	(Australia) Terry Pilkadaris
2	7 Mar 2010	Maybank Malaysian Open^{1}	−14 (69-70-67-68=274)	1 stroke	(South Korea) K. J. Choi

^{1}Co-sanctioned by the European Tour

Asian Tour playoff record (0–1)

No.	Year	Tournament	Opponent	Result
1	2008	GS Caltex Maekyung Open	(South Korea) Hwang Inn-choon	Lost to par on first extra hole

=== Web.com Tour wins (1) ===
Legend
Finals events (1)
Other Web.com Tour (0)

No.	Date	Tournament	Winning score	Margin of victory	Runner-up
1	15 Sep 2013	Nationwide Children's Hospital Championship	−12 (68-65-70-69=272)	5 strokes	(United States) Edward Loar

== Results in major championships ==
Tournament	2010	2011	2012	2013	2014	2015	2016
Masters Tournament						T38	
U.S. Open	T40	T30			T52		
The Open Championship	CUT	T30					CUT
PGA Championship	T28	T45	T21		CUT		

Did not play

CUT = missed the half-way cut
"T" indicates a tie for a place

=== Summary ===
Tournament	Wins	2nd	3rd	Top-5	Top-10	Top-25	Events	Cuts made
Masters Tournament	0	0	0	0	0	0	1	1
U.S. Open	0	0	0	0	0	0	3	3
The Open Championship	0	0	0	0	0	0	3	1
PGA Championship	0	0	0	0	0	1	4	3
Totals	0	0	0	0	0	1	11	8

- Most consecutive cuts made – 6 (2010 PGA – 2014 U.S. Open)
- Longest streak of top-10s – 0

== Results in The Players Championship ==
Tournament	2013	2014	2015	2016	2017
The Players Championship	T66	T72	CUT		T22

Did not play

CUT = missed the halfway cut
"T" indicates a tie for a place

== Results in World Golf Championships ==
Tournament	2010	2011	2012	2013	2014
Match Play		R64			
Championship		59			
Invitational					T37
Champions	T16				

Did not play

QF, R16, R32, R64 = Round in which player lost in match play
"T" = Tied

== Team appearances ==
- Royal Trophy (representing Asia): 2011

== See also ==
- 2011 PGA Tour Qualifying School graduates
- 2013 Web.com Tour Finals graduates
