= Ryu Hyun-woo (golfer) =

South Korean golfer

Personal information
- Nationality: South Korea
- Born: 8 September 1981 (age 45)
- Height: 1.74 m (5 ft 9 in)
- Weight: 81 kg (179 lb; 12.8 st)

Career
- Sport: Golf
- Turned professional: 2002
- Current tours: Japan Golf Tour; Korean Tour
- Former tour: OneAsia Tour
- Professional wins: 4

Number of wins by tour
- Japan Golf Tour: 2
- Other: 2

Achievements and awards
- Korean Tour Order of Merit winner: 2013
- Korean Tour Player of the Year: 2013

Ryu Hyun-woo (Korean: 류현우; born 8 September 1981) is a South Korean professional golfer.

== Career ==
Ryu has played on the Korean Tour, the OneAsia Tour since 2010 and the Japan Golf Tour since 2012. He won on the Japan Golf Tour in September 2012 at the Coca-Cola Tokai Classic. He won the 2013 GS Caltex Maekyung Open, co-sanctioned by the OneAsia Tour and the Korean Tour.

== Professional wins (4) ==
=== Japan Golf Tour wins (2) ===
| No. | Date | Tournament | Winning score | Margin of victory | Runner(s)-up |
|---|---|---|---|---|---|
| 1 | 30 Sep 2012 | Coca-Cola Tokai Classic | −6 (71-73-67-71=282) | Playoff | (Japan) Shingo Katayama |
| 2 | 3 Sep 2017 | Fujisankei Classic | −3 (72-69-71-69=281) | Playoff | (United States) Seungsu Han, (Japan) Satoshi Kodaira |

Japan Golf Tour playoff record (2–1)

| No. | Year | Tournament | Opponent(s) | Result |
|---|---|---|---|---|
| 1 | 2012 | Coca-Cola Tokai Classic | (Japan) Shingo Katayama | Won with par on first extra hole |
| 2 | 2017 | Fujisankei Classic | (United States) Seungsu Han, (Japan) Satoshi Kodaira | Won with par on first extra hole |
| 3 | 2024 | ACN Championship | (Japan) Takumi Kanaya | Lost to birdie on first extra hole |

=== OneAsia Tour wins (1) ===
| No. | Date | Tournament | Winning score | Margin of victory | Runners-up |
|---|---|---|---|---|---|
| 1 | 12 May 2013 | GS Caltex Maekyung Open^{1} | −14 (72-65-67-70=274) | 1 stroke | (South Korea) Kim Do-hoon, (South Korea) Kim Hyung-sung |

^{1}Co-sanctioned by the Korean Tour

=== Korean Tour wins (2) ===
| No. | Date | Tournament | Winning score | Margin of victory | Runner(s)-up |
|---|---|---|---|---|---|
| 1 | 18 Oct 2009 | Shinhan Donghae Open | −10 (68-70-68=206) (Note: Shortened to 54 holes due to weather.) | 1 stroke | (South Korea) Kim Dae-hyun |
| 2 | 12 May 2013 | GS Caltex Maekyung Open^{1} | −14 (72-65-67-70=274) | 1 stroke | (South Korea) Kim Do-hoon, (South Korea) Kim Hyung-sung |

^{1}Co-sanctioned by the OneAsia Tour

Korean Tour playoff record (0–1)

| No. | Year | Tournament | Opponent | Result |
|---|---|---|---|---|
| 1 | 2018 | SK Telecom Open | (South Korea) Kwon Sung-yeol | Lost to birdie on second extra hole |

== Results in World Golf Championships ==
| Tournament | 2017 |
|---|---|
| Championship | |
| Match Play | |
| Invitational | |
| Champions | T24 |

Did not play

"T" = Tied
