= Kim Tae-hoon (golfer) =

South Korean professional golfer

Personal information
- Nationality: South Korea
- Born: 15 September 1985 (age 41)

Career
- Sport: Golf
- Turned professional: 2005
- Current tour: Korean Tour
- Professional wins: 4

Achievements and awards
- Korean Tour Order of Merit winner: 2020
- Korean Tour Player of the Year: 2020

Kim Tae-hoon (Korean: 김태훈; born 15 September 1985) is a South Korean professional golfer who plays on the Korean Tour. He has won four times on the tour, including the 2020 Genesis Championship.

== Professional career ==
Kim turned professional in 2005 and made his debut on the Korean Tour in 2007. However, he had little success until 2013 when he won the Bosung CC Classic and had 8 top-10 finishes in the 11 events he played in. He finished third in the points-based Order of Merit and fourth in the prize money list. He had less success in 2014 but was twice runner-up, in the Happiness Songhak Construction Open and the KJ Choi Invitational, and finished 16th in the money list. Kim got his second win in the 2015 Caido Golf LIS Tour Championship, the final event of the season. After two poor season, Kim won again in 2018, at the Dong-A Membership Group Busan Open, after a final round 63. In 2019 he was second to Kim Bi-o in the NS HomeShopping Gunsan CC Jeonbuk Open. The 2020 season didn't start until July, but Kim was tied for third in the opening event, tied 4th in the KPGA Championship, joint runner-up in the Hyundai Insurance KJ Choi Invitational before winning the Genesis Championship in October. On the 2020 Korean Tour he finished top of both the Genesis Points and the prize money lists.

== Professional wins (4) ==
=== Korean Tour wins (4) ===
No.	Date	Tournament	Winning score	Margin of victory	Runner-up
1	4 Aug 2013	Bosung CC Classic	−21 (67-66-67-67=267)	3 strokes	(South Korea) Ryu Hyun-woo
2	8 Nov 2015	Caido Golf LIS Tour Championship	−13 (68-65-70=203) (Note: Shortened to 54 holes due to weather.)	1 stroke	(South Korea) Park Jun-won
3	19 Aug 2018	Dong-A Membership Group Busan Open	−13 (76-67-69-63=275)	1 stroke	(South Korea) Byun Jin-jae
4	11 Oct 2020	Genesis Championship	−6 (70-68-71-73=282)	2 strokes	(South Korea) Lee Jae-kyeong

Korean Tour playoff record (0–1)

No.	Year	Tournament	Opponents	Result
1	2020	Hyundai Insurance KJ Choi Invitational	(South Korea) Chun Jae-han, (South Korea) Lee Chang-woo	Lee won with eagle on fourth extra hole Kim eliminated by par on first hole
