= 2019 Korean Tour =

Golf tour season

2019 Korean Tour season
- Duration: 18 April 2019 – 13 October 2019
- Number of official events: 15
- Most wins: (South Korea) Kim Bi-o (2)
- Order of Merit: (South Korea) Moon Kyong-jun
- Player of the Year: (South Korea) Moon Kyong-jun
- Rookie of the Year: (South Korea) Lee Jae-kyeong

The 2019 Korean Tour was the 42nd season on the Korean Tour, the main professional golf tour in South Korea since it was formed in 1978.

== Schedule ==
The following table lists official events during the 2019 season.

Date	Tournament	Location	Purse (₩)	Winner (Note: The number in brackets after each winner's name is the number of Korean Tour events they had won up to and including that tournament. This information is only shown for Korean Tour members.)	OWGR points	Other tours (Note: ASA − Asian Tour; JPN − Japan Golf Tour.)	Notes
21 Apr	DB Insurance Promy Open	Gyeonggi	500,000,000	(Canada) Richard T. Lee (2)	9		
28 Apr	NS HomeShopping Gunsan CC Jeonbuk Open	North Jeolla	500,000,000	(South Korea) Kim Bi-o (4)	9		
5 May	GS Caltex Maekyung Open	Gyeonggi	1,200,000,000	(South Korea) Lee Tae-hee (3)	12	ASA	
12 May	Huons Elravie Celebrity Pro-Am	Gyeonggi	600,000,000	(South Korea) Jeon Ga-lam (2)	9		Pro-Am
19 May	SK Telecom Open	Gyeonggi	1,200,000,000	(South Korea) Ham Jeong-woo (1)	9		
26 May	KB Financial Liiv Championship	Gyeonggi	700,000,000	(South Korea) Seo Hyung-seok (2)	9		
9 Jun	Descente Korea Munsingwear Matchplay	South Gyeongsang	1,000,000,000	(South Korea) Lee Hyung-joon (5)	9		
16 Jun	KEB Hana Bank Invitational	Gyeonggi	1,200,000,000	(South Korea) Seo Yo-seop (1)	9		
23 Jun	Kolon Korea Open	South Chungcheong	1,200,000,000	(Thailand) Jazz Janewattananond (1)	13	ASA	
30 Jun	KPGA Championship	South Gyeongsang	1,000,000,000	(Australia) Won Joon Lee (1)	9		
1 Sep	Woosung Construction Aramir CC Busan Gyeongnam Open	South Gyeongsang	500,000,000	(South Korea) Lee Jae-kyeong (1)	9		New tournament
22 Sep	Shinhan Donghae Open	Gyeonggi	1,200,000,000	(South Africa) Jbe' Kruger (n/a)	14	ASA, JPN	
29 Sep	DGB Financial Group Volvik Daegu Gyeongbuk Open	North Gyeongsang	500,000,000	(South Korea) Kim Bi-o (5)	9		
6 Oct	Hyundai Insurance KJ Choi Invitational	South Gyeongsang	1,000,000,000	(South Korea) Lee Soo-min (3)	9		
13 Oct	Genesis Championship	Gyeonggi	1,500,000,000	(South Korea) Im Sung-jae (1)	9		

== Order of Merit ==
The Order of Merit was titled as the Genesis Points and was based on tournament results during the season, calculated using a points-based system. The leading player on the Order of Merit earned status to play on the 2020 European Tour.

Position	Player	Points	Status earned
1	(South Korea) Moon Kyong-jun	4,126	Promoted to European Tour
2	(South Korea) Lee Soo-min	3,780	
3	(South Korea) Ham Jeong-woo	3,529	
4	(South Korea) Lee Hyung-joon	3,260	
5	(South Korea) Seo Hyung-seok	3,127	

== Awards ==
Award	Winner	Ref.
Player of the Year (Grand Prize Award)	(South Korea) Moon Kyong-jun	
Rookie of the Year (Myeong-chul Award)	(South Korea) Lee Jae-kyeong	
