= Golf at the 2006 Asian Games – Men's team =

Men's team at the 2006 Asian Games
- Venue: Doha Golf Club
- Date: 8 December 2006 – 11 December 2006
- Competitors: 68 from 17 nations

Medalists
gold medal	South Korea; Kang Sung-hoon, Kim Do-hoon 752, Kim Do-hoon 753, Kim Kyung-tae
silver medal	India; Gaganjeet Bhullar, Joseph Chakola, Chiragh Kumar, Anirban Lahiri
bronze medal	Chinese Taipei; Chan Shih-chang, Chiang Chen-chih, Pan Cheng-tsung, Pan Fu-chiang

The men's team competition at the 2006 Asian Games in Doha was held from 8 December to 11 December at the Doha Golf Club. The men played at 7181 yards with a par 72.

== Schedule ==
All times are Arabia Standard Time (UTC+03:00)

Date	Time	Event
Friday, 8 December 2006	07:00	1st round
Saturday, 9 December 2006	07:00	2nd round
Sunday, 10 December 2006	07:00	3rd round
Monday, 11 December 2006	07:00	Final round

== Results ==
Rank	Team	Round				Total	To par
Rank	Team	1	2	3	4	Total	To par
1st place, gold medalist(s)	South Korea (KOR)	205	208	208	215	836	−28
	Kang Sung-hoon	68	72	68	73		
	Kim Do-hoon 752	~~69~~	65	73	72		
	Kim Do-hoon 753	69	~~73~~	~~75~~	~~74~~		
	Kim Kyung-tae	68	71	67	70		
2nd place, silver medalist(s)	India (IND)	210	211	211	217	849	−15
	Gaganjeet Bhullar	70	70	70	73		
	Joseph Chakola	~~73~~	70	70	~~77~~		
	Chiragh Kumar	71	71	71	72		
	Anirban Lahiri	69	~~73~~	~~72~~	72		
3rd place, bronze medalist(s)	Chinese Taipei (TPE)	205	210	215	220	850	−14
	Chan Shih-chang	69	70	~~77~~	~~78~~		
	Chiang Chen-chih	70	69	74	72		
	Pan Cheng-tsung	66	71	68	72		
	Pan Fu-chiang	~~76~~	~~77~~	73	76		
4	Japan (JPN)	208	212	211	222	853	−11
	Yuta Ikeda	70	70	70	73		
	Yuki Ito	68	70	71	75		
	Naoyuki Tamura	~~73~~	~~75~~	70	74		
	Yuki Usami	70	72	~~72~~	~~76~~		
5	Philippines (PHI)	211	219	211	216	857	−7
	Jay Bayron	68	74	70	74		
	Michael Bibat	70	72	67	70		
	Gene Bondoc	~~74~~	~~76~~	~~75~~	72		
	Marvin Dumandan	73	73	74	~~78~~		
6	Singapore (SIN)	216	215	211	223	865	+1
	Choo Tze Huang	70	70	69	70		
	Justin Han	~~75~~	74	~~79~~	~~80~~		
	Vincent Khua	72	~~75~~	72	80		
	Jonathan Leong	74	71	70	73		
7	Malaysia (MAS)	213	214	222	219	868	+4
	Edmund Au	72	~~75~~	75	~~78~~		
	Ben Leong	69	70	74	71		
	Shukree Othman	~~73~~	73	~~77~~	73		
	Siva Chandhran Supramaniam	72	71	73	75		
8	Thailand (THA)	216	224	211	219	870	+6
	Anujit Hirunratanakorn	71	~~79~~	~~71~~	74		
	Varan Israbhakdi	~~78~~	74	71	~~81~~		
	Nakarintra Ratanakul	74	74	70	74		
	Pavit Tangkamolprasert	71	76	70	71		
9	China (CHN)	218	221	212	220	871	+7
	Fan Zhipeng	~~73~~	~~78~~	72	~~82~~		
	Hu Mu	72	74	66	73		
	Wu Ashun	73	72	~~75~~	72		
	Wu Kangchun	73	75	74	75		
10	Bahrain (BRN)	224	234	213	220	891	+27
	Hamed Farhan	76	76	70	71		
	Abdulla Mubarak	76	~~82~~	~~77~~	74		
	Daij Mubarak	~~84~~	81	75	~~81~~		
	Nasser Mubarak	72	77	68	75		
11	Sri Lanka (SRI)	223	224	220	225	892	+28
	Tissa Chandradasa	75	~~77~~	73	~~77~~		
	Amrit de Soysa	~~80~~	76	~~74~~	77		
	Mithun Perera	73	75	73	75		
	Kandasamy Prabagaran	75	73	74	73		
12	Pakistan (PAK)	224	227	229	233	913	+49
	Vaqas Ahmed	75	73	74	78		
	Muhammad Ali Hai	71	76	74	75		
	Muhammad Safdar Khan	~~78~~	~~78~~	~~84~~	~~80~~		
	Tariq Mehmood	78	78	81	80		
13	Vietnam (VIE)	233	239	219	228	919	+55
	Nguyễn Thái Dương	~~81~~	~~84~~	~~80~~	73		
	Nguyễn Văn Thống	75	77	69	76		
	Trần Lê Duy Nhất	79	79	71	~~82~~		
	Trịnh Văn Thọ	79	83	79	79		
14	Lebanon (LIB)	237	226	232	228	923	+59
	Rachid Akl	78	~~80~~	77	75		
	Adnan Hammoud	~~81~~	76	76	~~80~~		
	Ali Hammoud	79	75	79	73		
	Mehdi Ramadan	80	75	~~84~~	80		
15	Nepal (NEP)	240	230	232	241	943	+79
	Yelamber Singh Adhikari	80	71	77	81		
	Chuda Bahadur Bhandari	82	82	~~83~~	82		
	Tashi Ghale	~~86~~	~~86~~	82	~~85~~		
	Shivaram Shrestha	78	77	73	78		
16	Qatar (QAT)	232	249	251	238	970	+106
	Tariq Abu-Mooza	76	83	86	82		
	Abdulaziz Al-Bishi	~~85~~	~~85~~	~~88~~	~~90~~		
	Abdulaziz Al-Buainen	79	82	80	77		
	Adel Saeedan Al-Hamad	77	84	85	79		
17	Macau (MAC)	251	242	258	249	1000	+136
	Chan Sio Peng	81	74	80	82		
	João de Senna Fernandes	~~93~~	89	90	81		
	Leung Kam Hung	82	79	88	86		
	Tang Kam Pui	88	~~96~~	~~93~~	~~99~~		
