= Kim Do-hoon (golfer, born March 1989) =

South Korean golfer

Personal information
- Nationality: South Korea
- Born: 12 March 1989 (age 37)
- Height: 1.78 m (5 ft 10 in)
- Weight: 75 kg (165 lb; 11 st 11 lb)

Career
- Sport: Golf
- Turned professional: 2007
- Current tour: Korean Tour
- Former tour: Japan Golf Tour
- Professional wins: 1

Best results in major championships
- Masters Tournament: DNP
- PGA Championship: DNP
- U.S. Open: T30: 2011
- The Open Championship: DNP

Achievements and awards
- Korean Tour Rookie of the Year: 2009
Medal record
Asian Games
Gold medal – first place	2006 Doha	Men's team

Kim Do-hoon (Korean: 김도훈; born 12 March 1989) is a South Korean professional golfer. He is also called Kim Do-hoon 752 to distinguish him from another South Korean golfer also called Kim Do-hoon, 752 being his membership number at the Korea Professional Golfers' Association. He won the 2010 Dongbu Insurance Promy Gunsan CC Open on the Korean Tour. He played on the Japan Golf Tour from 2010 to 2015.

== Amateur career ==
In October 2006, Kim represented South Korea in the Eisenhower Trophy in South Africa where the team finished 5th. In December, he was part of the South Korean team that won the gold medal in the men's team event at the 2006 Asian Games. He finished tied third in the individual event but missed out on a bronze medal on countback.

== Professional career ==
Kim turned professional in 2007. From 2010 to 2015, he played mostly on the Japan Golf Tour, returning to the Korean Tour in 2016. He had one win on the Korean Tour, taking the 2010 Dongbu Insurance Promy Gunsan CC Open in a playoff. He was a runner-up in the 2010 Hanyang Sujain-Pine Beach Open and in the 2015 GS Caltex Maekyung Open, an event co-sanctioned with the OneAsia Tour.

Kim's most successful season on the Japan Golf Tour was his first, 2010. He was joint runner-up in the ANA Open and lost a playoff for the Casio World Open, finishing the season 11th in the tour money list. Kim qualified for the 2011 U.S. Open through sectional qualifying in Japan and finished tied for 30th place. He was a runner-up in the 2011 Asia-Pacific Panasonic Open and was 18th in the money list, after including his U.S. Open prize money. Kim dropped to 20th in the money list in 2012 and was out of the top 50 from 2013 to 2015.

== Professional wins (1) ==
=== Korean Tour wins (1) ===
No.	Date	Tournament	Winning score	Margin of victory	Runners-up
1	20 Jun 2010	Dongbu Insurance Promy Gunsan CC Open	−11 (72-67-66-72=277)	Playoff	(South Korea) Kang Kyung-nam, (South Korea) Kang Wook-soon

Korean Tour playoff record (1–0)

No.	Year	Tournament	Opponents	Result
1	2010	Dongbu Insurance Promy Gunsan CC Open	(South Korea) Kang Kyung-nam, (South Korea) Kang Wook-soon	Won with birdie on sixth extra hole Kang Wook-soon eliminated by par on first hole

== Playoff record ==
Japan Golf Tour playoff record (0–1)

No.	Year	Tournament	Opponent	Result
1	2010	Casio World Open	(Japan) Michio Matsumura	Lost to birdie on fourth extra hole

== Results in major championships ==
Tournament	2011
Masters Tournament	
U.S. Open	T30
The Open Championship	
PGA Championship	

Did not play

"T" indicates a tie for a place

== Team appearances ==
Amateur

- Eisenhower Trophy (representing South Korea): 2006
