= Bryan Saltus =

American golfer (born 1971)

Personal information
- Nationality: United States
- Born: February 26, 1971 (age 55)

Career
- Sport: Golf
- College: Orange Coast College
- Turned professional: 1996
- Current tour: Asian Tour
- Professional wins: 1

Number of wins by tour
- Asian Tour: 1

Bryan Saltus (born February 26, 1971) is an American professional golfer.

== Early life ==
In 1971, Saltus was born in California. He began playing golf at the age of ten.

== Professional career ==
In 1996, at the advanced age of 25, he turned professional. In 2004, he joined the Asian Tour and quickly established himself as a top player. He had his highest Order of Merit finish in 2006, at 24th, and the following year won his first tournament at the inaugural Johnnie Walker Cambodian Open. However, after that Saltus' form declined, and he lost his tour card at the end of 2009.

== Professional wins (1) ==
=== Asian Tour wins (1) ===
No.	Date	Tournament	Winning score	Margin of victory	Runner-up
1	Dec 2, 2007	Johnnie Walker Cambodian Open	−17 (66-67-71-67=271)	3 strokes	(Australia) Adam Groom
