= Indian Masters =

Tournament information
- Location: Delhi, India
- Established: 2008
- Course: Delhi Golf Club
- Par: 72
- Length: 7,014 yards (6,414 m)
- Tours: European Tour; Asian Tour
- Format: Stroke play
- Prize fund: US$2,500,000
- Month played: February
- Final year: 2008

Tournament record score
- Aggregate: 279 Shiv Chawrasia (2008)
- To par: −9 as above

Final champion
- (India) Shiv Chawrasia

Location map
- Location in India Location in Delhi

The Indian Masters was a professional golf tournament on the European and Asian Tours, that was played in February 2008. The tournament was introduced as part of the continuing globalisation of the European Tour, making India the 37th territory to stage a European Tour event, and increasing to twelve the number of tournaments played in Asia as of the 2008 season.

The tournament was initially only sanctioned by the European Tour and the Indian Golf Union, the announcement of which drew sharp criticism from both Asian Tour chairman Kyi Hla Han and the Professional Golf Tour of India (PGTI), with both organisations claiming that the European Tour had breached International Federation of PGA Tours protocols by not making advance arrangements with them for co-sanctioning of an event to be staged in their region. The Indian Golf Union issued a statement a few days after the tournament was announced stating that the European Tour had approached it, and was willing to offer 20 invitations to Indian domestic players through the PGTI. The dispute was eventually settled, and the Asian Tour agreed terms to co-sanction the tournament in advance of its 2008 debut. The 2008 prize fund was US$2.5 million, which is the largest ever offered at a golf tournament in India, and also one of the largest in Asia, but slightly below the overall average on the European Tour. The promoters are Golf in Dubai, who are also responsible for the Dubai Desert Classic on the European Tour and the Dubai Ladies Masters on the Ladies European Tour.

Early in December 2008, organisers announced that due to financial problems with sponsors stemming from the 2008 financial crisis, and security concerns following the 2008 Mumbai attacks, the 2009 event would be cancelled.

The long-established Indian Open is also an Asian Tour event, and beginning in 2015 will be co-sanctioned by the European Tour.

== Winners ==
Year	Tours (Note: ASA − Asian Tour; EUR − European Tour.)	Winner	Score	To par	Margin of victory	Runner-up
Indian Masters
2009	ASA, EUR	Cancelled due to economic problems				
Emaar-MGF Indian Masters
2008	ASA, EUR	(India) Shiv Chawrasia	279	−9	2 strokes	(Republic of Ireland) Damien McGrane

== See also ==
- Avantha Masters, another co-sanctioned event in India, played from 2010 to 2013, considered a continuation of the Indian Masters by the European Tour but not by the Asian Tour
