= 2009 Asian Tour =

Golf tour season

2009 Asian Tour season
- Duration: 5 February 2009 – 6 December 2009
- Number of official events: 23 (Note: A further two tournaments were scheduled but were cancelled.)
- Most wins: (Thailand) Thongchai Jaidee (2)
- Order of Merit: (Thailand) Thongchai Jaidee
- Players' Player of the Year: (Thailand) Thongchai Jaidee
- Rookie of the Year: (India) Chinnaswamy Muniyappa

The 2009 Asian Tour was the 15th season of the modern Asian Tour (formerly the Asian PGA Tour), the main professional golf tour in Asia (outside of Japan) since it was established in 1995.

== Schedule ==
The following table lists official events during the 2009 season.

Date	Tournament	Host country	Purse (US$)	Winner (Note: The number in brackets after each winner's name is the number of Asian Tour events they had won up to and including that tournament. This information is only shown for Asian Tour members.)	OWGR points	Other tours (Note: ANZ − PGA Tour of Australasia; EUR − European Tour; JPN − Japan Golf Tour; KOR − Korean Tour.)	Notes
~~8 Feb~~	Indian Masters	India	–	Cancelled	–	EUR	
8 Feb (Note: Rescheduled following the cancellation of the Indian Masters.)	Asian Tour International	Thailand	300,000	(South Africa) James Kamte (1)	14		
15 Feb	Maybank Malaysian Open	Malaysia	2,000,000	(United States) Anthony Kang (3)	30	EUR	
22 Feb	Johnnie Walker Classic	Australia	£1,250,000	(New Zealand) Danny Lee (a) (n/a)	32	ANZ, EUR	
1 Mar	Enjoy Jakarta Indonesia Open	Indonesia	1,250,000	(Thailand) Thongchai Jaidee (11)	20	EUR	
8 Mar	Singha Thailand Open	Thailand	500,000	(India) Jyoti Randhawa (8)	14		
22 Mar	SAIL Open	India	400,000	(Thailand) Chapchai Nirat (3)	14		
29 Mar	Black Mountain Masters	Thailand	500,000	(Sweden) Johan Edfors (n/a)	14		New tournament
26 Apr	Ballantine's Championship	South Korea	€2,100,000	(Thailand) Thongchai Jaidee (12)	32	EUR, KOR	
17 May	GS Caltex Maekyung Open	South Korea	₩600,000,000	(South Korea) Bae Sang-moon (3)	14	KOR	
26 Jul	Indonesia President Invitational	Indonesia	400,000	(India) Gaganjeet Bhullar (1)	14		
2 Aug	Brunei Open	Brunei	300,000	(Australia) Darren Beck (1)	14		
8 Aug	Worldwide Holdings Selangor Masters	Malaysia	300,000	(Australia) Rick Kulacz (2)	14		
16 Aug	Queen's Cup	Thailand	300,000	(Thailand) Chinnarat Phadungsil (3)	14		New tournament
6 Sep	Omega European Masters	Switzerland	2,500,000	(Sweden) Alex Norén (n/a)	32	EUR	New to Asian Tour
13 Sep	Macau Open	Macau	500,000	(Thailand) Thaworn Wiratchant (11)	14		
27 Sep	Asia-Pacific Panasonic Open	Japan	1,500,000	(Japan) Daisuke Maruyama (n/a)	20	JPN	
4 Oct	Mercuries Taiwan Masters	Taiwan	500,000	(Taiwan) Lin Wen-tang (5)	14		
11 Oct	Hero Honda Indian Open	India	1,250,000	(India) Chinnaswamy Muniyappa (1)	14		
25 Oct	Iskandar Johor Open	Malaysia	1,000,000	(South Korea) K. J. Choi (4)	14		
1 Nov	Barclays Singapore Open	Singapore	5,000,000	(England) Ian Poulter (n/a)	46	EUR	
15 Nov	UBS Hong Kong Open	Hong Kong	2,500,000	(France) Grégory Bourdy (n/a)	44	EUR	
22 Nov	Johnnie Walker Cambodian Open	Cambodia	300,000	(Australia) Marcus Both (2)	14		
6 Dec	King's Cup	Thailand	300,000	(Taiwan) Chan Yih-shin (1)	14		New tournament
~~13 Dec~~	Volvo Masters of Asia	Thailand	–	Cancelled	–		

== Order of Merit ==
The Order of Merit was based on prize money won during the season, calculated in U.S. dollars.

Position	Player	Prize money ($)
1	(Thailand) Thongchai Jaidee	981,932
2	(China) Liang Wenchong	779,580
3	(United States) Anthony Kang	411,063
4	(Australia) Scott Hend	354,392
5	(India) Jyoti Randhawa	344,351

== Awards ==
Award	Winner	Ref.
Players' Player of the Year	(Thailand) Thongchai Jaidee	
Rookie of the Year	(India) Chinnaswamy Muniyappa	
