= Kim Do-hoon (golfer, born April 1989) =

South Korean golfer

Personal information
- Nationality: South Korea
- Born: 11 April 1989 (age 37)
- Height: 1.82 m (6 ft 0 in)
- Weight: 78 kg (172 lb; 12 st 4 lb)

Career
- Sport: Golf
- Turned professional: 2007
- Current tour: Korean Tour
- Former tour: Japan Golf Tour
- Professional wins: 2
Medal record
Asian Games
Gold medal – first place	2006 Doha	Men's team

Kim Do-hoon (Korean: 김도훈; born 11 April 1989) is a South Korean professional golfer. He is also called Kim Do-hoon 753 to distinguish him from another South Korean golfer also called Kim Do-hoon, 753 being his membership number at the Korea Professional Golfers' Association. He won twice on the Korean Tour, the 2010 Tomato Savings Bank Open and the 2013 Munsingwear Matchplay Championship.

== Amateur career ==
In December 2006, Kim was part of the South Korean team that won the gold medal in the men's team event at the 2006 Asian Games.

== Professional career ==
Kim turned professional in 2007. He played mostly on the Korean Tour but played on the Japan Golf Tour in 2009, finishing tied for 7th in the Kansai Open. He had two wins on the Korean Tour, the 2010 Tomato Savings Bank Open and the 2013 Munsingwear Matchplay Championship. He was a runner-up in the 2009 SK Telecom Open, the 2012 Dongbu Insurance Promy Open and in the 2013 GS Caltex Maekyung Open, an event co-sanctioned with the OneAsia Tour. His best season was 2013 when he finished fourth in the tour points list and third in prize money.

== Professional wins (2) ==
=== Korean Tour wins (2) ===
No.	Date	Tournament	Winning score	Margin of victory	Runners-up
1	11 Apr 2010	Tomato Savings Bank Open	−9 (64-72-74-69=279)	4 strokes	(South Korea) Kim Hyung-sung
2	6 Oct 2013	Munsingwear Matchplay Championship	19 holes		(South Korea) Song Young-han
