= 2008 Korean Tour =

Golf tour season

2008 Korean Tour season
- Duration: 2 April 2008 – 1 November 2008
- Number of official events: 20
- Most wins: (South Korea) Bae Sang-moon (2) (South Korea) K. J. Choi (2) (South Korea) Hwang Inn-choon (2) (South Korea) Kim Hyung-sung (2) (Australia) Andrew McKenzie (2)
- Order of Merit: (South Korea) Kim Hyung-sung
- Player of the Year: (South Korea) Kim Hyung-sung
- Rookie of the Year: (South Korea) Kang Sung-hoon

The 2008 Korean Tour, titled as the 2008 SBS Korean Tour for sponsorship reasons, was the 31st season on the Korean Tour, the main professional golf tour in South Korea since it was formed in 1978.

It was the fourth season of the tour under a title sponsorship agreement with Seoul Broadcasting System, that was announced in June 2004.

== Schedule ==
The following table lists official events during the 2008 season.

Date	Tournament	Location	Purse (₩)	Winner (Note: The number in brackets after each winner's name is the number of Korean Tour events they had won up to and including that tournament. This information is only shown for Korean Tour members.)	OWGR points	Other tours (Note: ASA − Asian Tour; EUR − European Tour.)	Notes
16 Mar	Ballantine's Championship	Jeju	€2,000,000	(Northern Ireland) Graeme McDowell (n/a)	28	ASA, EUR	New tournament
23 Mar	KEB Invitational (1st)	China	400,000,000	(South Korea) Bae Sang-moon (3)	n/a		New tournament
7 Apr	SBS Emerson Pacific Tottori Prefecture Open	Japan	300,000,000	(South Korea) Lee Seong-ho (2)	n/a		New tournament
20 Apr	SK Telecom Open	Gyeonggi	600,000,000	(South Korea) K. J. Choi (13)	n/a		
27 Apr	SBS Tomato Savings Bank Open	Jeju	300,000,000	(South Korea) Kim Hyung-sung (2)	n/a		
4 May	GS Caltex Maekyung Open	Gyeonggi	600,000,000	(South Korea) Hwang Inn-choon (2)	14	ASA	
25 May	SBS Lake Hills Open	South Gyeongsang	300,000,000	(Australia) Andrew Tschudin (1)	n/a		
1 Jun	SBS Kumho Asiana Open	Gyeonggi	500,000,000	(South Korea) Hwang Inn-choon (3)	n/a		
15 Jun	Philos Open	Gyeonggi	300,000,000	(South Korea) Hur In-hoi (1)	n/a		New tournament
22 Jun	SBS Ace Savings Bank Montvert Open	Gyeonggi	300,000,000	(South Korea) Kim Hyung-sung (3)	n/a		
31 Aug	SBS Johnnie Walker Blue Label Open	Jeju	300,000,000	(South Korea) Kang Wook-soon (10)	n/a		New tournament
7 Sep	SBS Yeonwoo Heavenland Open	North Gyeongsang	300,000,000	(South Korea) Kim Wi-joong (1)	n/a		
21 Sep	KEB Invitational (2nd)	Gangwon	400,000,000	(South Korea) Kim Dae-sub (6)	n/a		
28 Sep	SBS Samsung Benest Open	Gyeonggi	600,000,000	(Australia) Andrew McKenzie (1)	n/a		
5 Oct	Kolon-Hana Bank Korea Open	South Chungcheong	1,000,000,000	(South Korea) Bae Sang-moon (4)	18	ASA	
12 Oct	Shinhan Donghae Open	Gyeonggi	700,000,000	(South Korea) K. J. Choi (14)	n/a		
19 Oct	SBS Meritz Solmoro Open	Gyeonggi	500,000,000	(South Korea) Kim Hyung-tae (3)	n/a		
1 Nov	SBS Dongbu Insurance Promy Cup; Eden Valley Resort Matchplay Championship	South Gyeongsang	300,000,000	(South Korea) Kang Kyung-nam (6)	n/a		New tournament
9 Nov	SBS Hana Tour Championship	Gangwon	300,000,000	(South Korea) Choi Ho-sung (1)	n/a		
16 Nov	NH NongHyup KPGA Championship	Gyeonggi	500,000,000	(Australia) Andrew McKenzie (2)	n/a		

== Order of Merit ==
The Order of Merit was titled as the Ballantine's Points and was based on tournament results during the season, calculated using a points-based system.

Position	Player	Points
1	(South Korea) Kim Hyung-sung	6,765
2	(South Korea) Kim Dae-sub	4,025
3	(South Korea) Bae Sang-moon	3,375
4	(South Korea) Kang Kyung-nam	3,230
5	(South Korea) Kang Sung-hoon	3,030

== Awards ==
Award	Winner	Ref.
Player of the Year (Grand Prize Award)	(South Korea) Kim Hyung-sung	
Rookie of the Year (Myeong-chul Award)	(South Korea) Kang Sung-hoon	
