= 2009 Korean Tour =

Golf tour season

2009 Korean Tour season
- Duration: 2 April 2009 – 1 November 2009
- Number of official events: 16
- Most wins: (South Korea) Bae Sang-moon (2) (South Korea) Lee Seong-ho (2) (South Korea) Park Sang-hyun (2)
- Order of Merit: (South Korea) Bae Sang-moon
- Player of the Year: (South Korea) Bae Sang-moon
- Rookie of the Year: (South Korea) Kim Do-hoon

The 2009 Korean Tour, titled as the 2009 SBS Korean Tour for sponsorship reasons, was the 32nd season on the Korean Tour, the main professional golf tour in South Korea since it was formed in 1978.

It was the fifth season of the tour under a title sponsorship agreement with Seoul Broadcasting System, that was announced in June 2004.

== Schedule ==
The following table lists official events during the 2009 season.

| Date | Tournament | Location | Purse (₩) | Winner (Note: The number in brackets after each winner's name is the number of Korean Tour events they had won up to and including that tournament. This information is only shown for Korean Tour members.) | OWGR points | Other tours (Note: ASA − Asian Tour; EUR − European Tour; ONE − OneAsia Tour.) | Notes |
|---|---|---|---|---|---|---|---|
| 5 Apr | KEB Invitational (1st) | China | 400,000,000 | (South Korea) Lee Tae-gyu (1) | n/a | | |
| 12 Apr | SBS Tomato Savings Bank Open | South Gyeongsang | 300,000,000 | (South Korea) Kang Wook-soon (11) | n/a | | |
| 26 Apr | Ballantine's Championship | Jeju | €2,100,000 | (Thailand) Thongchai Jaidee (n/a) | 32 | ASA, EUR | |
| 17 May | GS Caltex Maekyung Open | Gyeonggi | 600,000,000 | (South Korea) Bae Sang-moon (5) | 14 | ASA | |
| 24 May | SK Telecom Open | Gyeonggi | 600,000,000 | (South Korea) Park Sang-hyun (1) | n/a | | |
| 31 May | SBS Lake Hills Open | South Jeolla | 300,000,000 | (United States) Hong Chang-kyu (1) | n/a | | |
| 7 Jun | SBS Kumho Asiana KPGA Championship | Gyeonggi | 500,000,000 | (South Korea) Hong Soon-sang (2) | n/a | | |
| 14 Jun | SBS Ace Savings Bank Open | Gyeonggi | 300,000,000 | (South Korea) Lee Seong-ho (3) | n/a | | |
| 6 Sep | SBS Samsung Benest Open | Gyeonggi | 600,000,000 | (South Korea) Lee Seong-ho (4) | n/a | | |
| 13 Sep | Kolon-Hana Bank Korea Open | South Chungcheong | 1,000,000,000 | (South Korea) Bae Sang-moon (6) | 14 | ONE | |
| 20 Sep | SBS Meritz Solmoro Open | Gyeonggi | 500,000,000 | (South Korea) Kim Dae-sub (7) | n/a | | |
| 27 Sep | KEB Invitational (2nd) | Gangwon | 400,000,000 | (South Korea) Kim Dae-hyun (1) | n/a | | |
| 11 Oct | SBS Johnnie Walker Blue Label Open | Jeju | 300,000,000 | (South Korea) Maeng Dong-seop (1) | n/a | | |
| 18 Oct | Shinhan Donghae Open | Gyeonggi | 700,000,000 | (South Korea) Ryu Hyun-woo (1) | n/a | | |
| 25 Oct | SBS Emerson Pacific Hilton Namhae Open | South Gyeongsang | 300,000,000 | (South Korea) Park Sang-hyun (2) | n/a | | New tournament |
| 1 Nov | SBS Dongbu Insurance Guncan CC Matchplay Championship | North Jeolla | 300,000,000 | (South Korea) Lee Ki-sang (1) | n/a | | |

== Order of Merit ==
The Order of Merit was titled as the Ballantine's Points and was based on tournament results during the season, calculated using a points-based system.

| Position | Player | Points |
|---|---|---|
| 1 | (South Korea) Bae Sang-moon | 4,770 |
| 2 | (South Korea) Kim Dae-sub | 4,395 |
| 3 | (South Korea) Lee Seong-ho | 3,115 |
| 4 | (South Korea) Kim Dae-hyun | 3,045 |
| 5 | (South Korea) Park Sang-hyun | 3,015 |

== Awards ==
| Award | Winner | Ref. |
|---|---|---|
| Player of the Year (Grand Prize Award) | (South Korea) Bae Sang-moon | |
| Rookie of the Year (Myeong-chul Award) | (South Korea) Kim Do-hoon | |
