= Kim Hyung-sung =

South Korean golfer

Personal information
- Nationality: South Korea
- Born: 12 May 1980 (age 46)
- Height: 1.80 m (5 ft 11 in)
- Weight: 70 kg (154 lb; 11 st 0 lb)

Career
- Sport: Golf
- Turned professional: 2005
- Current tour: Japan Golf Tour
- Former tour: Korean Tour
- Professional wins: 7
- Highest ranking: 62 (29 December 2013)

Number of wins by tour
- Japan Golf Tour: 4
- Other: 3

Best results in major championships
- Masters Tournament: DNP
- PGA Championship: CUT: 2014
- U.S. Open: CUT: 2014
- The Open Championship: CUT: 2013, 2014

Achievements and awards
- Korean Tour Order of Merit winner: 2008

Kim Hyung-sung (Korean: 김형성; born 12 May 1980) is a South Korean professional golfer.

== Career ==
Kim has played on the Japan Golf Tour since 2009. He won his first tour event in 2012 at the Vana H Cup KBC Augusta.

== Professional wins (7) ==
=== Japan Golf Tour wins (4) ===
Legend
Japan majors (1)
Other Japan Golf Tour (3)

No.	Date	Tournament	Winning score	Margin of victory	Runner(s)-up
1	26 Aug 2012	Vana H Cup KBC Augusta	−18 (69-64-68-69=270)	1 stroke	(Japan) Akio Sadakata
2	19 May 2013	Japan PGA Championship Nissin Cupnoodles Cup	−5 (69-70-75-65=279)	1 stroke	(Japan) Yoshinori Fujimoto, (Japan) Hiroyuki Fujita, (Japan) Hideki Matsuyama
3	4 May 2014	The Crowns	−11 (64-67-70-68=269)	4 strokes	(South Korea) Jang Ik-jae
4	4 Oct 2015	Top Cup Tokai Classic	−12 (69-72-69-66=276)	Playoff	(Japan) Shingo Katayama

Japan Golf Tour playoff record (1–0)

No.	Year	Tournament	Opponent	Result
1	2015	Top Cup Tokai Classic	(Japan) Shingo Katayama	Won with birdie on second extra hole

=== Korean Tour wins (3) ===
No.	Date	Tournament	Winning score	Margin of victory	Runner-up
1	22 Oct 2006	SBS LIG KPGA Championship	−14 (68-68-67-71=274)	2 strokes	(South Korea) Mo Joong-kyung
2	27 Apr 2008	SBS Tomato Savings Bank Open	+2 (73-68-79-70=290)	2 strokes	(South Korea) Kim Dae-sub
3	22 Jun 2008	SBS Ace Savings Bank Montvert Open	−12 (67-69-69-71=276)	4 strokes	(South Korea) Park Do-kyu

== Results in major championships ==
Tournament	2013	2014
Masters Tournament		
U.S. Open		CUT
The Open Championship	CUT	CUT
PGA Championship		CUT

Did not play

CUT = missed the half-way cut
"T" = tied

== Results in World Golf Championships ==
Tournament	2012	2013	2014
Match Play			
Championship			T34
Invitational			
Champions	T56		63

Did not play

"T" = Tied

== Team appearances ==
this list may be incomplete

- World Cup (representing South Korea): 2011
- Royal Trophy (representing Asia): 2013
- EurAsia Cup (representing Asia): 2014
