= 2021 Open Championship =

Golf tournament

149th Open Championship

Tournament information
- Dates: 15–18 July 2021
- Location: Sandwich, England; 51.274°N 1.367°E
- Course: Royal St George's Golf Club
- Organized by: The R&A
- Tours: European Tour; PGA Tour; Japan Golf Tour

Statistics
- Par: 70
- Length: 7,189 yards (6,574 m)
- Field: 156 players, 77 after cut
- Cut: 141 (+1)
- Prize fund: $11,500,000
- Winner's share: $2,070,000

Champion
- (United States) Collin Morikawa
- 265 (−15)
- Location in the United Kingdom Location in England Location in Kent

The 2021 Open Championship, officially the 149th Open Championship, was a golf tournament played 15–18 July at Royal St George's Golf Club in Sandwich, England. It was originally scheduled for 16–19 July 2020, but was cancelled due to the COVID-19 pandemic. It was the 15th Open Championship at Royal St George's, and the first since Darren Clarke won in 2011.

The championship was won by Collin Morikawa with a score of 265, 15-under-par, two strokes ahead of Jordan Spieth. Morikawa became the first player to win on his Open Championship debut since Ben Curtis in 2003, also at Royal St George's. He also became the first male golfer to win two majors on debut – backing up his 2020 PGA Championship success.

Lee Westwood broke Jay Haas's record of playing in the most majors without a win, with 88.

== Organisation ==
The Open Championship was organised by the R&A, and was included in the PGA Tour, European Tour, and Japan Golf Tour calendars under the major championships category. The tournament was a 72-hole (4 rounds) stroke play competition held over 4 days, with 18 holes played each day. Play was in groups of three for the first two days, and groups of two in the final two days. Groupings for the first two days were decided by the organisers, with each group having one morning, and one afternoon tee time. On the final two days, players teed off in reverse order of aggregate score, with the leaders last. After 36 holes there was a cut, after which the top 70 and ties progressed through to compete in the third and fourth rounds. In the event of a tie for the lowest score after four rounds, a four-hole aggregate playoff would be held to determine the winner; this would be followed by sudden-death extra holes if necessary until a winner emerged.

The previous record for attendance at Royal St George's was 183,000 but organisers expected the 2020 edition to exceed 200,000. Friday, Saturday and Sunday tickets sold out well in advance, with a few Thursday tickets still to be sold. With COVID-19 restrictions in place, up to 32,000 fans were allowed to attend each day of the tournament.

=== Cancellation in 2020 ===
In March 2020, The R&A released a statement regarding the COVID-19 pandemic, stating they were examining a range of scenarios for staging the championships, with the focus on proceeding as planned, but also considering other available contingency options. On 6 April, the R&A announced the Championship was cancelled for 2020; it was the first time since the Second World War that the event was not held. Only the Open Championships for men (Open and Senior Open) were not played; the Women's Open was played behind closed doors.

== Venue ==
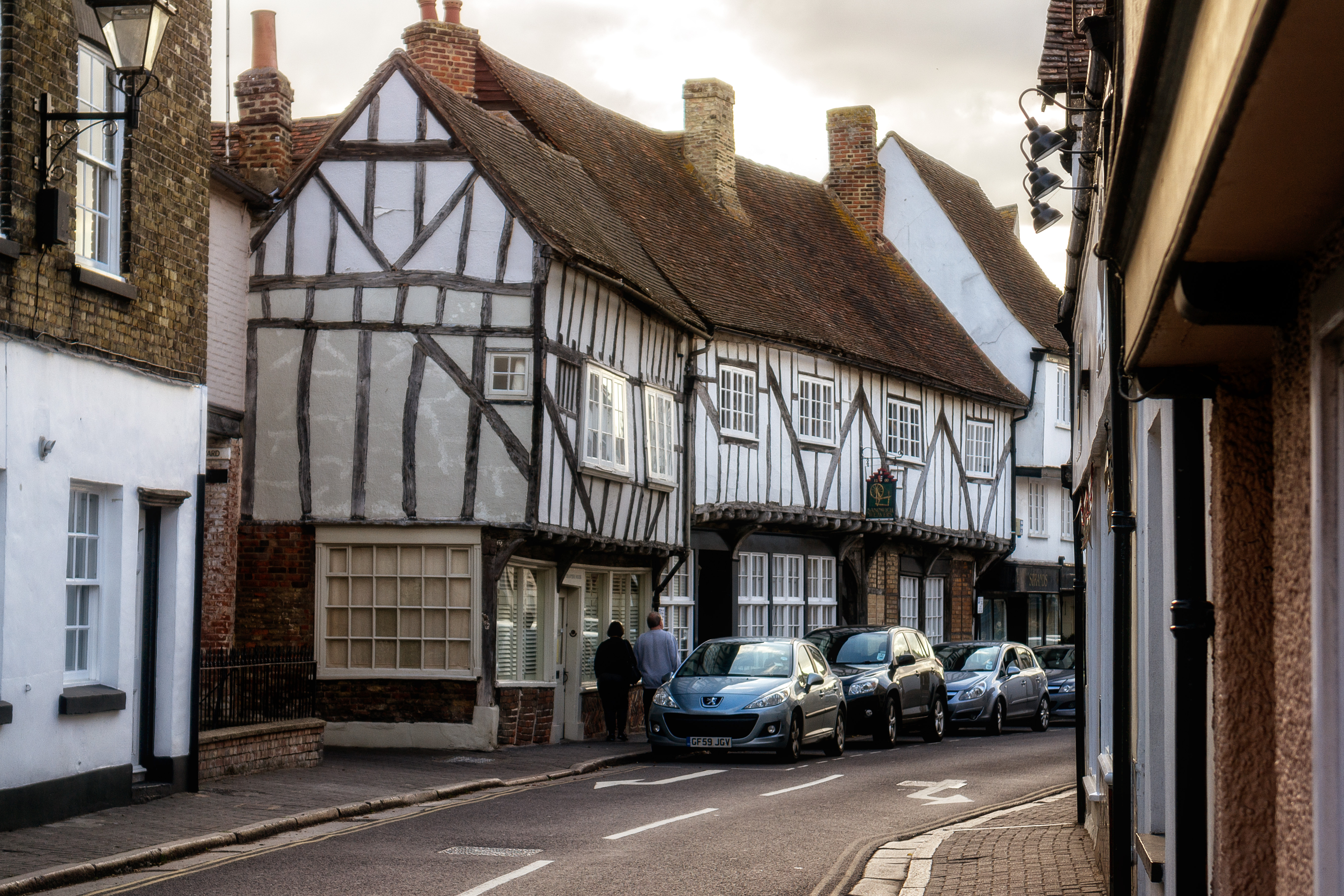
Sandwich, the town where the tournament was held, is well known for its many original medieval buildings.

The 2021 Open Championship was the 149th edition of the tournament and was held at Royal St George's Golf Club. It is located in Sandwich Bay, a long sweeping inlet of the sea between Ramsgate and Deal, on the east coast of Kent, England. The coastal area consists of sand flats with their associated salt marshes and coastal sand dunes. These conditions are well suited to links golf, with Prince's Golf Club (1932) and Royal Cinque Ports Golf Club (1909, 1920), both previous Open venues, found immediately north and south of St George's.

In preparation for the Open Championship, Royal St George's tasked golf course architects Mackenzie and Ebert to make alterations to the course. Large bunkers at the 4th and 7th holes, and a large bare sand area to the left of the 5th hole, were restored. Two bunkers to the left of the 17th green were replaced by a swale and bunkering was altered on the 18th hole. Improvements were also made to the practice facilities.

Royal St George's is the only venue on the current rota located in Southern England. The 2021 tournament was the 15th edition held at the venue, having first hosted in 1894, when it became the first club outside Scotland to host the championship. The previous edition held at the venue was in 2011, won by Darren Clarke. The closest large city is London, about seventy miles (110 km) west-northwest.

To accommodate for the tournament, the local station had the platforms extended to accommodate 12-carriage trains. There is a dedicated camping and glamping area, called The Open Camping Village, with a capacity for 2,200 people. The local town had a Sandwich in bloom initiative to try to encourage much more tourist activity than in 2011.

=== Course layout ===
Hole	Yards	Par	Hole	Yards	Par
1	445	4	10	415	4
2	421	4	11	238	3
3	239	3	12	379	4
4	491	4	13	456	4
5	422	4	14	547	5
6	174	3	15	496	4
7	566	5	16	162	3
8	450	4	17	426	4
9	412	4	18	450	4
Out	3,620	35	In	3,569	35
Source:		Total		7,189	70

Lengths of the course for previous Opens (since 1950)

- 2011: 7,211 yards (6,594 m), par 70
- 2003: 7,106 yards (6,498 m), par 71
- 1993: 6,860 yards (6,273 m), par 70
- 1985: 6,857 yards (6,270 m), par 70
- 1981: 6,827 yards (6,243 m), par 70

== Field ==
The Open Championship field was made up of 156 players, who gained entry through various exemption criteria and qualifying tournaments. The criteria included past Open champions, recent major winners, top ranked players in the world rankings and from the leading world tours, and winners and high finishers from various designated tournaments, including the Open Qualifying Series; the winners of designated amateur events, including The Amateur Championship and U.S. Amateur, also gained exemption provided they remain an amateur. Anyone not qualifying via exemption, and had a handicap of 0.4 or lower, could gain entry through regional and final qualifying events.

=== Criteria and exemptions ===
Each player is classified according to the first category in which he qualified, but other categories are shown in parentheses. (Note: (a) – indicates the player is an amateur.) The criteria were updated in December 2020, with the R&A adding additional criteria and extending others. Further adjustments were announced in May and June 2021, with additional places being available through final qualifying, and several additional exemptions added through nominated European Tour, PGA Tour, and Challenge Tour events.

1. The Open Champions aged 60 or under on 19 July 2020.

- Stewart Cink (4)
- Darren Clarke (2)
- Ernie Els (2)
- Pádraig Harrington
- Shane Lowry (2,3,4,5)
- Rory McIlroy (2,4,5,11,12,12a)
- Phil Mickelson (2,4,9)
- Francesco Molinari (2,5,6)
- Louis Oosthuizen (2,4,5,5a,12,15)
- Jordan Spieth (2,4)
- Henrik Stenson (2)
- Ian Baker-Finch, Mark Calcavecchia, Ben Curtis, John Daly, Todd Hamilton, Paul Lawrie, Justin Leonard, Tiger Woods (8,15) did not play.
- David Duval withdrew.
- Zach Johnson (2) withdrew after testing positive for COVID-19.

2. The Open Champions for 2010–2019.

3. Top 10 finishers and ties in the 2019 Open Championship.

- Tony Finau (4,12,15)
- Tommy Fleetwood (4,5,5a,12)
- Rickie Fowler (12,15)
- Tyrrell Hatton (4,5,5a,6,12a)
- Brooks Koepka (4,9,10,12)
- Robert MacIntyre (4,5)
- Patrick Reed (4,5a,8,12,12a,15)
- Lee Westwood (4,5,5a)
- Danny Willett (5,6,8)

4. Top 50 players in the Official World Golf Ranking (OWGR) for Week 21, 2021. (Note: Originally Week 21, 2020.)

- Abraham Ancer (12,15)
- Daniel Berger
- Christiaan Bezuidenhout (5,5a,18)
- Sam Burns
- Patrick Cantlay (12,15)
- Paul Casey (5,12)
- Corey Conners (12)
- Bryson DeChambeau (10,12,15)
- Harris English
- Matt Fitzpatrick (5,5a)
- Sergio García (5,8)
- Brian Harman
- Max Homa
- Billy Horschel
- Viktor Hovland
- Dustin Johnson (8,10,12,12a,15)
- Kevin Kisner (12)
- Jason Kokrak (12)
- Marc Leishman (12,15)
- Collin Morikawa (5a,9,12a)
- Joaquín Niemann (15)
- Ryan Palmer
- Victor Perez (5,5a)
- Jon Rahm (5,10,12,12a)
- Justin Rose (12)
- Xander Schauffele (12,12a,15)
- Scottie Scheffler (12a)
- Adam Scott (12,15)
- Webb Simpson (11,12,15)
- Cameron Smith (15)
- Justin Thomas (9,11,12,12a,15)
- Will Zalatoris
- Im Sung-jae (12,15) and Kim Si-woo withdrew to focus on the Olympic Games.
- Kevin Na withdrew, pointing to the COVID-19 related travel requirements.
- Matthew Wolff withdrew with no reason given.
- Hideki Matsuyama (8,12,15) withdrew after testing positive for COVID-19.

4a. Additional exemptions awarded from the Official World Golf Ranking for Week 26, 2021. (Note: To make up the full field of 156, additional places were allocated in ranking order from the Official World Golf Ranking at the time that these places were made available by the Championship Committee. The first 12 were added using the week 26 rankings on 30 June.)

- Kevin Streelman (ranked 52)
- Russell Henley (53)
- Carlos Ortiz (55)
- Charley Hoffman (57)
- Brendon Todd (64)
- Mackenzie Hughes (65)
- Chris Kirk (69)
- Talor Gooch (70)
- Lanto Griffin (72)
- Cameron Tringale (73)
- Lee Kyoung-hoon (67) withdrew due to the upcoming birth of his child.
- Bubba Watson (59) withdrew due being a close contact of someone who had tested positive for COVID-19.

5. Top 30 in the final 2019 Race to Dubai standings.

- Rafa Cabrera-Bello
- Jorge Campillo
- Justin Harding
- Benjamin Hébert
- Marcus Kinhult
- Kurt Kitayama
- Romain Langasque
- Li Haotong (15)
- Mike Lorenzo-Vera
- Joost Luiten
- Ian Poulter
- Erik van Rooyen
- Matthias Schwab
- Matt Wallace
- Paul Waring
- Bernd Wiesberger

5a. Top 10 in the final 2020 Race to Dubai standings. (Note: Additional criteria added in December 2020, following cancellation earlier in the year.)

- Aaron Rai

6. Recent winners of the BMW PGA Championship (2017–2020). (Note: 2020 winner added as criteria were revised in December 2020.)

- Alex Norén

7. Top 5 players, not already exempt, within the top 20 of the 2021 Race to Dubai through the BMW International Open. (Note: Originally the 2020 BMW International Open.)

- Richard Bland
- Dean Burmester
- Garrick Higgo
- Guido Migliozzi
- Jason Scrivener

8. Recent winners of the Masters Tournament (2016–2021). (Note: 2021 winner added as criteria were revised in December 2020.)

9. Recent winners of the PGA Championship (2015–2021).

- Jason Day
- Jimmy Walker

10. Recent winners of the U.S. Open (2016–2021).

- Gary Woodland (12,15)

11. Recent winners of the Players Championship (2018–2021).

12. The 30 qualifiers for the 2019 Tour Championship.

- Lucas Glover
- Matt Kuchar (15)
- Chez Reavie
- Brandt Snedeker
- Charles Howell III did not play.

12a. The leading ten qualifiers for the 2020 Tour Championship.

- Sebastián Muñoz

13. Top five players, not already exempt, within the top 20 of the 2020–21 FedEx Cup points list through the Travelers Championship. (Note: Originally the 2020 Travelers Championship.)

14. Winner of the 2019 Open de Argentina.

- Ricardo Celia

15. Playing members of the 2019 Presidents Cup teams.

- An Byeong-hun
- Adam Hadwin
- Pan Cheng-tsung

16. Winners of the 2019 and 2020–21 Asian Tour Order of Merit.

- Jazz Janewattananond

17. Winners of the 2019 and 2020–21 PGA Tour of Australasia Order of Merit.

- Ryan Fox
- Brad Kennedy

18. Winners of the 2019–20 and 2020–21 Sunshine Tour Order of Merit.

- J. C. Ritchie

19. Winners of the 2019 and 2020 Japan Open.

- Chan Kim
- Yuki Inamori

20. Winners of the 2020 and 2021 Asia-Pacific Diamond Cup Golf. (Note: The 2020 Asia-Pacific Diamond Cup Golf was cancelled.)

- Rikuya Hoshino

21. Top two players on the 2019 and 2020 Japan Golf Tour Official Money List. (Note: Due to disruption during the COVID-19 pandemic, the 2020 Japan Golf Tour season was joined with the 2021 tournament schedule to create a 2020–21 season.)

- Shaun Norris
- Shugo Imahira did not play.

22. The top two finishers, not already exempt, in the 2021 Mizuno Open. (Note: Originally the leading player, not already exempt, on the 2020 Japan Golf Tour Official Money List through the Japan Golf Tour Championship.)

- Ryutaro Nagano
- Juvic Pagunsan did not play.

23. Winner of the 2019 and 2020 Senior Open Championship. (Note: The 2020 Senior Open was cancelled.)

- Bernhard Langer did not play.

24. Winners of the 2020 and 2021 Amateur Championship.

- Joe Long (a)
- Laird Shepherd (a)

25. Winners of the 2019 and 2020 U.S. Amateur.

- ~~Andy Ogletree~~ (a) (Note: Exemption forfeited by turning professional.)
- ~~Tyler Strafaci~~ (a)

26. Winners of the 2020 and 2021 European Amateur.

- Matti Schmid (a)
- Christoffer Bring (a)

27. Recipient of the 2019 and 2020 Mark H. McCormack Medal.

- Cole Hammer (a)
- ~~Takumi Kanaya~~ (a)

28. Winner of the 2019 and 2020 Asia-Pacific Amateur Championship. (Note: The 2020 Asia-Pacific Amateur Championship was cancelled.)

- Lin Yuxin (a)

29. Winner of the 2020 and 2021 Latin America Amateur Championship. (Note: The 2021 Latin America Amateur Championship was cancelled.)

- Abel Gallegos (a)

30. The leading player, not already exempt, in the 2021 Kaskáda Golf Challenge (must have made the cut and not participated in Final Qualifying). (Note: Category added in June 2021.)

- Marcel Schneider

31. The leading three players, not already exempt, in the 2021 Dubai Duty Free Irish Open (must have made the cut and not participated in Final Qualifying).

- Lucas Herbert
- Rikard Karlberg
- Johannes Veerman

32. The leading player, not already exempt, in the 2021 Le Vaudreuil Golf Challenge (must have made the cut and not participated in Final Qualifying).

- Marcel Siem

33. The leading three players, not already exempt, in the 2021 Abrdn Scottish Open. (Note: Category added in May 2021.)

- Thomas Detry
- Min Woo Lee
- Jack Senior

34. The leading player, not already exempt, in the 2021 John Deere Classic (must have finished within the top 5 and ties).

- Ryan Moore withdrew due to him still recovering from a back injury.

35. Open Qualifying Series

- Jaco Ahlers
- Marcus Armitage
- Joel Dahmen
- Branden Grace
- Matt Jones
- Takumi Kanaya
- Ryosuke Kinoshita
- Richard T. Lee
- Keith Mitchell
- Aaron Pike
- Poom Saksansin
- Tom Kim withdrew.
- Danny Lee withdrew due to injury.

36. Final Qualifying

- Sam Bairstow (a)
- Daniel Croft
- Gonzalo Fernández-Castaño
- Sam Forgan
- Daniel Hillier
- Ben Hutchinson
- Deyen Lawson
- Richard Mansell
- Nick Poppleton
- Jonathan Thomson
- Connor Worsdall
- Louis de Jager withdrew after testing positive for COVID-19.

Reserves added to the field. (Note: To maintain the full field of 156, any players withdrawing prior to the start of the championship were replaced from a reserve list. Reserves were initially taken in ranking order from Official World Golf Ranking at the time. During the week of the championship, the first three reserves were taken from the OWGR; they were followed by the leading finishers in the Abrdn Scottish Open, with ties broken by their position in the OWGR.)

From the Week 26 (27 June) Official World Golf Ranking:

- Emiliano Grillo (ranked 74) (Note: Grillo and Bradley replaced Im Sung-jae and Kim Si-woo.)
- Keegan Bradley (75)
- Daniel van Tonder (77) (Note: Van Tonder replaced Tom Kim.)

From the Week 27 (4 July) Official World Golf Ranking:

- Martin Kaymer (79) (Note: Kaymer replaced Kevin Na; Cameron Davis, number 67 in the week 27 rankings, was in line to replace Na but was unable to travel due to his green card application.)
- Andy Sullivan (81) (Note: Sullivan replaced Matthew Wolff.)
- Antoine Rozner (84) (Note: Rozner replaced Lee Kyoung-hoon.)
- Troy Merritt (86) (Note: Merritt replaced Danny Lee.)
- Harold Varner III (87) (Note: Varner and Steele replaced Hideki Matsuyama and Bubba Watson.)
- Brendan Steele (88)
- John Catlin (89) (Note: Catlin replaced David Duval.)
- Adam Long (90) (Note: Long replaced Ryan Moore.)
- Sam Horsfield (92) (Note: Horsfield replaced Zach Johnson.)
- Dylan Frittelli (94) (Note: Frittelli replaced Louis de Jager.)

==== Open Qualifying Series ====
The Open Qualifying Series (OQS) for the 2020 Open Championship was to consist of twelve events from the six major tours, however only four events took place prior to cancellation of the Open in 2020. The 13 players who had qualified from these four events retained their eligibility for 2021. The remaining tournaments were either cancelled due to the COVID-19 pandemic or proceeded without offering places in the Open.

Places were available to the leading players (not otherwise exempt) who finished in the top n and ties. In the event of ties, positions went to players ranked highest according to that week's OWGR.

Location	Tournament	Date	Spots	Top	Qualifiers
Australia	Emirates Australian Open	8 Dec 2019	3	10	Matt Jones, Takumi Kanaya, Aaron Pike
Africa	South African Open	12 Jan 2020	3	10	Jaco Ahlers, Marcus Armitage, Branden Grace
Singapore	SMBC Singapore Open	19 Jan 2020	4	12	Tom Kim, Ryosuke Kinoshita, Richard T. Lee, Poom Saksansin
United States	Arnold Palmer Invitational	8 Mar 2020	3	10	Joel Dahmen, Danny Lee, Keith Mitchell
Ireland	Dubai Duty Free Irish Open	31 May 2020	4	12	Tournament rescheduled to September without OQS status
Morocco	Trophée Hassan II	7 Jun 2020	1	5	Tournament cancelled
Canada	RBC Canadian Open	14 Jun 2020	3	10	Tournament cancelled
Korea	Kolon Korea Open	28 Jun 2020	2	8	Tournament cancelled
United States	Travelers Championship	28 Jun 2020	2	8	Tournament proceeded without OQS status
United States	John Deere Classic	12 Jul 2020	1	5	Tournament cancelled

==== Final Qualifying ====
In 2020, thirteen regional qualifying events were scheduled to be held at Alwoodley, Berwick-upon-Tweed, Burhill, Caldy, Fairhaven, Frilford Heath, Kedleston Park, Minchinhampton, Moor Park, Northamptonshire County, and Rochester & Cobham Park in England, Panmure in Scotland, and County Louth in Republic of Ireland|Ireland. Final Qualifying events were then to be played on 1 July 2020 with at least twelve places in the championship available. The events were to be hosted at Fairmont St Andrews in Scotland, and Notts (Hollinwell), Prince's and St Annes Old Links in England.

Following the postponement of the championship to 2021, the R&A announced in March 2021 that regional qualifying would be held on 26 and 27 June at Notts (Hollinwell), Prince's, St Annes Old Links and West Lancashire, with final qualifying at the same venues on 29 June. The announcement also confirmed that least eight places would be available through final qualifying. In May, the number of available places was increased to the usual twelve.

The Final Qualifying events were played on 29 June at four courses. Three qualifying places were available at each location, with 72 golfers competing at each.

Location	Qualifiers (Note: (R) – indicates a golfer who came through Regional Qualifying.)
Notts (Hollinwell)	Daniel Hillier, Richard Mansell, Jonathan Thomson
Prince's	Sam Forgan, Deyen Lawson, Connor Worsdall (R)
St Annes Old Links	Sam Bairstow (a), Gonzalo Fernández-Castaño, Ben Hutchinson (R)
West Lancashire	Daniel Croft (R), Louis de Jager, Nick Poppleton (R)

== Round summaries ==
=== First round ===
Thursday, 15 July 2021

Louis Oosthuizen, the 2010 champion and runner-up in the previous two majors, opened with seven straight pars before making six birdies in a span of nine holes. He shot a bogey-free 64 (−6) and took a one-shot lead after the first round.

Jordan Spieth was one-over on the round before making four straight birdies on the front-nine. After making birdie on both the 15th and 16th, he finished with a round of 65 (−5) to tie Brian Harman for second place.

Five Englishmen were inside the top-10 after 18 holes, including 2019 runner-up Tommy Fleetwood, who birdied the last hole to shoot three-under 67 and join a 10-way tie for ninth place. Defending champion Shane Lowry had a one-over 71, as did Darren Clarke, who won the last time the Open was held at Royal St George's in 2011.

Phil Mickelson, winner of the PGA Championship two months earlier and the 2013 Open champion, had a 10-over 80, his worst score at this tournament since 1998, and finished the round tied for last place. Lin Yuxin was the leading amateur after a round of 69.

Place	Player	Score	To par
1	(South Africa) Louis Oosthuizen	64	−6
T2	(United States) Brian Harman	65	−5
T2	(United States) Jordan Spieth	65	−5
T4	(United States) Stewart Cink	66	−4
T4	(South Africa) Dylan Frittelli	66	−4
T4	(France) Benjamin Hébert	66	−4
T4	(Canada) Mackenzie Hughes	66	−4
T4	(United States) Webb Simpson	66	−4
T9	(South Korea) An Byeong-hun	67	−3
T9	(England) Tommy Fleetwood	67	−3
T9	(South Africa) Justin Harding	67	−3
T9	(United States) Collin Morikawa	67	−3
T9	(England) Justin Rose	67	−3
T9	(United States) Scottie Scheffler	67	−3
T9	(England) Jack Senior	67	−3
T9	(Germany) Marcel Siem	67	−3
T9	(England) Andy Sullivan	67	−3
T9	(England) Danny Willett	67	−3

=== Second round ===
Friday, 16 July 2021

First-round leader Louis Oosthuizen set a 36-hole Open Championship scoring record after a round of 65 (−5). After consecutive birdies on holes 12 and 13, Oosthuizen eagled the par-five 14th to go six-under on his round and open a three-shot lead. He bogeyed the 16th, his first bogey of the tournament, before finishing with pars on the final two holes to post 11-under. His total of 129 broke by one shot the previous 36-hole scoring record, first set by Nick Faldo in 1992 and Brandt Snedeker in 2012.

Collin Morikawa, making his Open debut, had seven birdies and only one bogey in a six-under round of 64. He led by three shots after finishing his round in the morning before being passed by Oosthuizen in the afternoon, ending up two shots back at nine-under. Jordan Spieth was tied for the lead after being four-under through 12 holes before a bogey on the 15th dropped him back to eight-under following a round of 67 (−3).

Matti Schmid had a second-round 65 to equal the record for the lowest round by an amateur in the Open Championship; a record set by Tom Lewis in 2011, also at Royal St George's. Schmid had an opening-round 74, leaving him on 139 after two rounds, 1-under-par. Lin Yuxin was the other amateur to make the cut, after a second round 72.

77 players made the 36-hole cut at 141 (+1). Notable players to miss the cut included past champions Francesco Molinari, Henrik Stenson, Stewart Cink, Ernie Els, Darren Clarke, and Phil Mickelson.

Place	Player	Score	To par
1	(South Africa) Louis Oosthuizen	64-65=129	−11
2	(United States) Collin Morikawa	67-64=131	−9
3	(United States) Jordan Spieth	65-67=132	−8
T4	(South Africa) Dylan Frittelli	66-67=133	−7
T4	(United States) Dustin Johnson	68-65=133	−7
T4	(United States) Scottie Scheffler	67-66=133	−7
T7	(Argentina) Emiliano Grillo	70-64=134	−6
T7	(South Africa) Justin Harding	67-67=134	−6
T7	(Germany) Marcel Siem	67-67=134	−6
T7	(England) Andy Sullivan	67-67=134	−6
T7	(South Africa) Daniel van Tonder	68-66=134	−6

=== Third round ===
Saturday, 17 July 2021

Louis Oosthuizen held the outright lead for the third consecutive round after a one-under-par 69. Oosthuizen began the round with six pars before making a birdie on the seventh and ninth holes to open a two-shot lead at 13-under-par. At the par-three 11th, he failed to get up-and-down after missing the green with his tee shot for his first bogey of the round. Right of the green on the 13th, he left his chip shot short and made his second bogey in three holes to fall back into a tie for the lead. He made a birdie on the par-three 16th with an approach shot within eight feet, finishing the round at 12-under-par and with a one-shot lead.

Collin Morikawa, two behind at the start of the round, was two-over-par for his first five holes before coming back with a birdie on the par-five seventh and another from 25 feet on the eighth hole. He made another long birdie putt on the 13th and tapped in for birdie on the par-five 14th after reaching the green in two, making a two-under 68 and ending up at 11-under-par.

Jordan Spieth made five birdies in his first 10 holes and was part of a three-way tie for the lead with Oosthuizen and Morikawa on the back-nine. He bogeyed the 11th from a greenside bunker, three-putted for par on the 14th, and, on the 17th, failed to get over the false front of the green with his approach shot from the fairway and made another bogey. After missing a birdie putt on the 18th, Spieth's two-foot-putt for par also missed. He played his last eight holes in three-over-par to fall back to third place at nine-under-par, three shots behind the leader.

Corey Conners moved into a tie for fourth place after a third-round 66. Robert MacIntyre had the best round of the day, a 5-under-par 65.

Place	Player	Score	To par
1	(South Africa) Louis Oosthuizen	64-65-69=198	−12
2	(United States) Collin Morikawa	67-64-68=199	−11
3	(United States) Jordan Spieth	65-67-69=201	−9
T4	(Canada) Corey Conners	68-68-66=202	−8
T4	(United States) Scottie Scheffler	67-66-69=202	−8
T6	(South Africa) Dylan Frittelli	66-67-70=203	−7
T6	(Canada) Mackenzie Hughes	66-69-68=203	−7
T6	(Spain) Jon Rahm	71-64-68=203	−7
T9	(South Africa) Justin Harding	67-67-70=204	−6
T9	(Germany) Marcel Siem	67-67-70=204	−6
T9	(Australia) Cameron Smith	69-67-68=204	−6

=== Final round ===
Sunday, 18 July 2021

==== Summary ====
Collin Morikawa became the first player since 2003 to win in his Open Championship debut, shooting a bogey-free 66 (−4) to finish two shots ahead of runner-up Jordan Spieth.

Beginning the round a shot off the lead, Morikawa made six straight pars before getting up-and-down from short of the green on the par-five seventh hole. He made a 25-foot putt for birdie on the eighth and finished his front-nine with a third straight birdie on the ninth to get to 14-under and take a three-shot lead into the back-nine. He made another long birdie putt over a ridge on the par-five 14th, and managed to save par from the fescue to the left of the green on the 15th. With pars on his final three holes, Morikawa finished at 15-under, not recording a bogey over his last 31 holes of the tournament.

Jordan Spieth, seeking his second Open title, was two-over on his round before making an eagle on the seventh and playing holes 7 to 14 in six-under-par to get within one of Morikawa. But he was unable to get any closer, finishing with four pars and ending up at 13-under-par for the tournament.

Louis Oosthuizen, leader through the first three rounds, fell from the lead with a bogey on the fourth hole and suffered another bogey on the seventh after hitting his bunker shot across the green into another bunker. He didn't make a birdie until the par-three 11th, his tee shot hitting off the flagstick before settling within five feet. He shot a one-over-par 71 and finished tied for third at 11-under-par, four behind Morikawa. U.S. Open champion Jon Rahm eagled the seventh and made four straight birdies on his back-nine to shoot 66 (−4) and tie Oosthuizen for third place.

With the win, Morikawa became the first player to win two major championships within their first eight career starts since Bobby Jones, and the first to win two different majors in his tournament debut.

==== Final leaderboard ====
Champion
Silver Medal winner (low amateur)
(a) = amateur
(c) = past champion

Top 10
Place	Player	Score	To par	Money (US$)
1	(United States) Collin Morikawa	67-64-68-66=265	−15	2,070,000
2	(United States) Jordan Spieth (c)	65-67-69-66=267	−13	1,198,000
T3	(South Africa) Louis Oosthuizen (c)	64-65-69-71=269	−11	682,500
T3	(Spain) Jon Rahm	71-64-68-66=269	−11	682,500
5	(South Africa) Dylan Frittelli	66-67-70-68=271	−9	480,000
T6	(Canada) Mackenzie Hughes	66-69-68-69=272	−8	386,500
T6	(United States) Brooks Koepka	69-66-72-65=272	−8	386,500
T8	(United States) Daniel Berger	70-67-68-68=273	−7	255,250
T8	(United States) Dustin Johnson	68-65-73-67=273	−7	255,250
T8	(Scotland) Robert MacIntyre	72-69-65-67=273	−7	255,250
T8	(United States) Scottie Scheffler	67-66-69-71=273	−7	255,250

Leaderboard below the top 10
Place	Player	Score	To par	Money ($)
T12	(Argentina) Emiliano Grillo	70-64-72-68=274	−6	181,083
T12	(Norway) Viktor Hovland	68-71-69-66=274	−6	181,083
T12	(Republic of Ireland) Shane Lowry (c)	71-65-69-69=274	−6	181,083
T15	(England) Paul Casey	68-67-70-70=275	−5	143,063
T15	(Canada) Corey Conners	68-68-66-73=275	−5	143,063
T15	(United States) Tony Finau	70-66-72-67=275	−5	143,063
T15	(Germany) Marcel Siem	67-67-70-71=275	−5	143,063
T19	(Spain) Sergio García	68-69-73-66=276	−4	109,000
T19	(South Africa) Justin Harding	67-67-70-72=276	−4	109,000
T19	(United States) Brian Harman	65-71-71-69=276	−4	109,000
T19	(England) Aaron Rai	70-69-68-69=276	−4	109,000
T19	(United States) Webb Simpson	66-72-67-71=276	−4	109,000
T19	(United States) Brandt Snedeker	68-68-72-68=276	−4	109,000
T19	(United States) Kevin Streelman	70-69-66-71=276	−4	109,000
T26	(South Korea) An Byeong-hun	67-70-73-67=277	−3	79,821
T26	(England) Matt Fitzpatrick	71-69-67-70=277	−3	79,821
T26	(United States) Jason Kokrak	70-70-66-71=277	−3	79,821
T26	(England) Ian Poulter	72-66-71-68=277	−3	79,821
T26	(United States) Xander Schauffele	69-71-72-65=277	−3	79,821
T26	(England) Andy Sullivan	67-67-71-72=277	−3	79,821
T26	(United States) Cameron Tringale	69-66-71-71=277	−3	79,821
T33	(United States) Bryson DeChambeau	71-70-72-65=278	−2	60,143
T33	(England) Tommy Fleetwood	67-71-70-70=278	−2	60,143
T33	(United States) Talor Gooch	69-72-67-70=278	−2	60,143
T33	(United States) Lanto Griffin	69-70-68-71=278	−2	60,143
T33	(France) Benjamin Hébert	66-74-71-67=278	−2	60,143
T33	(Australia) Cameron Smith	69-67-68-74=278	−2	60,143
T33	(England) Danny Willett	67-69-70-72=278	−2	60,143
T40	(South Africa) Dean Burmester	70-67-71-71=279	−1	45,417
T40	(United States) Max Homa	70-69-71-69=279	−1	45,417
T40	(South Africa) J. C. Ritchie	71-70-72-66=279	−1	45,417
T40	(United States) Justin Thomas	72-67-71-69=279	−1	45,417
T40	(South Africa) Daniel van Tonder	68-66-74-71=279	−1	45,417
T40	(England) Matt Wallace	70-68-69-72=279	−1	45,417
T46	(United States) Joel Dahmen	69-68-69-74=280	E	33,679
T46	(United States) Harris English	75-65-72-68=280	E	33,679
T46	(Thailand) Jazz Janewattananond	70-69-74-67=280	E	33,679
T46	(Northern Ireland) Rory McIlroy (c)	70-70-69-71=280	E	33,679
T46	(England) Justin Rose	67-70-70-73=280	E	33,679
T46	(Australia) Adam Scott	73-66-73-68=280	E	33,679
T46	(United States) Johannes Veerman	70-68-72-70=280	E	33,679
T53	(England) Marcus Armitage	69-72-70-70=281	+1	29,417
T53	(South Africa) Christiaan Bezuidenhout	68-72-70-71=281	+1	29,417
T53	(United States) Rickie Fowler	69-72-75-65=281	+1	29,417
T53	(United States) Billy Horschel	70-69-73-69=281	+1	29,417
T53	(United States) Chan Kim	70-69-74-68=281	+1	29,417
T53	(England) Jonathan Thomson	71-67-73-70=281	+1	29,417
T59	(Mexico) Abraham Ancer	69-71-71-71=282	+2	27,929
T59	(Japan) Ryosuke Kinoshita	72-69-72-69=282	+2	27,929
T59	(Chile) Joaquín Niemann	69-70-73-70=282	+2	27,929
T59	(United States) Chez Reavie	72-66-74-70=282	+2	27,929
T59	(France) Antoine Rozner	70-71-67-74=282	+2	27,929
T59	(Germany) Matti Schmid (a)	74-65-71-72=282	+2	0
T59	(England) Lee Westwood	71-67-72-72=282	+2	27,929
T59	(Austria) Bernd Wiesberger	71-70-70-71=282	+2	27,929
T67	(England) Richard Bland	70-70-73-70=283	+3	26,900
T67	(New Zealand) Ryan Fox	68-68-71-76=283	+3	26,900
T67	(England) Sam Horsfield	70-70-69-74=283	+3	26,900
T67	(England) Jack Senior	67-71-72-73=283	+3	26,900
T67	(United States) Brendan Steele	73-68-74-68=283	+3	26,900
72	(Republic of Ireland) Pádraig Harrington (c)	72-68-73-71=284	+4	26,375
73	(United States) Kevin Kisner	70-69-78-68=285	+5	26,250
T74	(China) Lin Yuxin (a)	69-72-74-71=286	+6	0
T74	(England) Richard Mansell	72-69-76-69=286	+6	26,125
T76	(United States) Sam Burns	71-69-76-72=288	+8	25,938
T76	(Thailand) Poom Saksansin	73-68-76-71=288	+8	25,938
CUT	(United States) Keegan Bradley	71-71=142	+2	
CUT	(Spain) Jorge Campillo	72-70=142	+2	
CUT	(England) Tyrrell Hatton	72-70=142	+2	
CUT	(United States) Russell Henley	70-72=142	+2	
CUT	(Japan) Takumi Kanaya	70-72=142	+2	
CUT	(Sweden) Rikard Karlberg	72-70=142	+2	
CUT	(Germany) Martin Kaymer	74-68=142	+2	
CUT	(Sweden) Marcus Kinhult	69-73=142	+2	
CUT	(United States) Chris Kirk	68-74=142	+2	
CUT	(United States) Kurt Kitayama	71-71=142	+2	
CUT	(Australia) Marc Leishman	75-67=142	+2	
CUT	(Italy) Guido Migliozzi	69-73=142	+2	
CUT	(Italy) Francesco Molinari (c)	68-74=142	+2	
CUT	(Colombia) Sebastián Muñoz	73-69=142	+2	
CUT	(Japan) Ryutaro Nagano	70-72=142	+2	
CUT	(United States) Ryan Palmer	72-70=142	+2	
CUT	(France) Victor Perez	70-72=142	+2	
CUT	(Sweden) Henrik Stenson (c)	71-71=142	+2	
CUT	(United States) Harold Varner III	70-72=142	+2	
CUT	(United States) Jimmy Walker	70-72=142	+2	
CUT	(Spain) Rafa Cabrera-Bello	70-73=143	+3	
CUT	(United States) Patrick Cantlay	74-69=143	+3	
CUT	(United States) Stewart Cink (c)	66-77=143	+3	
CUT	(South Africa) Branden Grace	72-71=143	+3	
CUT	(Australia) Lucas Herbert	70-73=143	+3	
CUT	(New Zealand) Daniel Hillier	72-71=143	+3	
CUT	(United States) Charley Hoffman	72-71=143	+3	
CUT	(Australia) Matt Jones	72-71=143	+3	
CUT	(Australia) Min Woo Lee	74-69=143	+3	
CUT	(United States) Troy Merritt	73-70=143	+3	
CUT	(South Africa) Shaun Norris	72-71=143	+3	
CUT	(United States) Patrick Reed	72-71=143	+3	
CUT	(Austria) Matthias Schwab	71-72=143	+3	
CUT	(England) Laird Shepherd (a)	74-69=143	+3	
CUT	(United States) Brendon Todd	72-71=143	+3	
CUT	(South Africa) Erik van Rooyen	69-74=143	+3	
CUT	(United States) Gary Woodland	73-70=143	+3	
CUT	(United States) John Catlin	75-69=144	+4	
CUT	(Colombia) Ricardo Celia	72-72=144	+4	
CUT	(South Africa) Ernie Els (c)	72-72=144	+4	
CUT	(Spain) Gonzalo Fernández-Castaño	71-73=144	+4	
CUT	(Canada) Adam Hadwin	75-69=144	+4	
CUT	(Canada) Richard T. Lee	75-69=144	+4	
CUT	(China) Li Haotong	75-69=144	+4	
CUT	(France) Mike Lorenzo-Vera	75-69=144	+4	
CUT	(United States) Keith Mitchell	68-76=144	+4	
CUT	(Australia) Jason Scrivener	73-71=144	+4	
CUT	(Australia) Jason Day	75-70=145	+5	
CUT	(United States) Lucas Glover	75-70=145	+5	
CUT	(Australia) Brad Kennedy	71-74=145	+5	
CUT	(Sweden) Alex Norén	74-71=145	+5	
CUT	(Mexico) Carlos Ortiz	75-70=145	+5	
CUT	(Northern Ireland) Darren Clarke (c)	71-75=146	+6	
CUT	(Belgium) Thomas Detry	72-74=146	+6	
CUT	(United States) Cole Hammer (a)	75-71=146	+6	
CUT	(Japan) Rikuya Hoshino	74-72=146	+6	
CUT	(United States) Matt Kuchar	74-72=146	+6	
CUT	(England) Joe Long (a)	73-73=146	+6	
CUT	(South Africa) Jaco Ahlers	68-79=147	+7	
CUT	(England) Sam Bairstow (a)	75-72=147	+7	
CUT	(Denmark) Christoffer Bring (a)	72-75=147	+7	
CUT	(France) Romain Langasque	74-73=147	+7	
CUT	(Netherlands) Joost Luiten	76-71=147	+7	
CUT	(Taiwan) Pan Cheng-tsung	71-76=147	+7	
CUT	(South Africa) Garrick Higgo	73-75=148	+8	
CUT	(England) Nick Poppleton	75-73=148	+8	
CUT	(England) Paul Waring	72-76=148	+8	
CUT	(Argentina) Abel Gallegos (a)	73-76=149	+9	
CUT	(England) Ben Hutchinson	77-72=149	+9	
CUT	(United States) Adam Long	72-77=149	+9	
CUT	(Australia) Aaron Pike	74-75=149	+9	
CUT	(Germany) Marcel Schneider	73-76=149	+9	
CUT	(England) Sam Forgan	73-77=150	+10	
CUT	(England) Connor Worsdall	77-73=150	+10	
CUT	(United States) Phil Mickelson (c)	80-72=152	+12	
CUT	(England) Daniel Croft	76-78=154	+14	
CUT	(Japan) Yuki Inamori	75-81=156	+16	
CUT	(Australia) Deyen Lawson	80-77=157	+17	
WD	(United States) Will Zalatoris	69	−1	

==== Scorecard ====
Final round

Hole	1	2	3	4	5	6	7	8	9	10	11	12	13	14	15	16	17	18
Par	4	4	3	4	4	3	5	4	4	4	3	4	4	5	4	3	4	4
(United States) Morikawa	−11	−11	−11	−11	−11	−11	−12	−13	−14	−14	−14	−14	−14	−15	−15	−15	−15	−15
(United States) Spieth	−9	−9	−9	−8	−8	−7	−9	−9	−10	−11	−11	−11	−12	−13	−13	−13	−13	−13
(South Africa) Oosthuizen	−12	−12	−12	−11	−11	−11	−10	−10	−10	−10	−11	−11	−10	−11	−11	−11	−11	−11
(Spain) Rahm	−7	−6	−6	−6	−6	−6	−8	−7	−7	−7	−7	−7	−8	−9	−10	−11	−11	−11

Cumulative tournament scores, relative to par

Eagle	Birdie	Bogey

== Media ==
The 2021 Open Championship was televised by Comcast in both the United Kingdom and the United States, domestically in the UK with the Sky Sports brand, and in the United States by the Golf Channel brand, including broadcast network coverage on weekends.
