= Satoshi Kodaira =

Japanese professional golfer

Personal information
- Nationality: Japan
- Born: 11 September 1989 (age 37) Mitaka, Tokyo, Japan
- Height: 1.72 m (5 ft 8 in)
- Weight: 70 kg (154 lb; 11 st 0 lb)

Career
- Sport: Golf
- Turned professional: 2010
- Current tour: Japan Golf Tour
- Former tours: PGA Tour; Japan Challenge Tour
- Professional wins: 11
- Highest ranking: 27 (15 April 2018)

Number of wins by tour
- PGA Tour: 1
- Japan Golf Tour: 8
- Other: 2

Best results in major championships
- Masters Tournament: T28: 2018
- PGA Championship: T48: 2017
- U.S. Open: T46: 2017
- The Open Championship: T35: 2018

Satoshi Kodaira (小平 智, Kodaira Satoshi; born 11 September 1989) is a Japanese professional golfer who plays on the PGA Tour and Japan Golf Tour.

== Career ==
While playing on the Japan Golf Tour, Kodaira has had eight victories, including two Japan Golf Tour majors, the 2013 Japan Golf Tour Championship Shishido Hills and the 2015 Japan Open. He has also won once on the Japan Challenge Tour in 2012.

In April 2018, Kodaira won the RBC Heritage, for his first victory on the PGA Tour, in just his 15th start. Players ranked in the world top 50 are automatically invited to that tournament, and Kodaira had been in the top 50 for most of the year. He came from six strokes behind in the final round and posted a five-under 66 to sit in the clubhouse at −12, well before the leading groups finished. Kim Si-woo, who had the lead, faltered on the remaining holes and fell back into a playoff with Kodaira. Both players parred the first two extra holes, before Kodaira holed a 25-foot putt for birdie to win on the third extra hole. The win lifted Kodaira to a career high 27th in the world rankings.

== Professional wins (11) ==
=== PGA Tour wins (1) ===
No.	Date	Tournament	Winning score	Margin of victory	Runner-up
1	15 Apr 2018	RBC Heritage	−12 (73-63-70-66=272)	Playoff	(South Korea) Kim Si-woo

PGA Tour playoff record (1–0)

No.	Year	Tournament	Opponent	Result
1	2018	RBC Heritage	(South Korea) Kim Si-woo	Won with birdie on third extra hole

=== Japan Golf Tour wins (8) ===
Legend
Flagship events (1)
Japan majors (3) (Note: The 2015 Japan Open Golf Championship was also a Japan major championship.)
Other Japan Golf Tour (5)

No.	Date	Tournament	Winning score	Margin of victory	Runner(s)-up
1	23 Jun 2013	Japan Golf Tour Championship Shishido Hills	−14 (70-64-70-70=274)	1 stroke	(Thailand) Kiradech Aphibarnrat, (South Korea) Hur Suk-ho
2	3 Aug 2014	Dunlop Srixon Fukushima Open	−16 (72-68-64-68=272)	2 strokes	(Japan) Yuki Inamori, (Japan) Hiroshi Iwata, (Japan) Ryosuke Kinoshita, (Japan) Ryutaro Nagano, (Japan) Kazuhiro Yamashita
3	18 Oct 2015	Japan Open Golf Championship	−13 (71-62-70-72=275)	1 stroke	(Japan) Yuta Ikeda
4	23 Oct 2016	Bridgestone Open	−14 (75-66-62-67=270)	1 stroke	(South Korea) Lee Kyoung-hoon
5	1 Oct 2017	Top Cup Tokai Classic	−14 (67-68-70-69=274)	1 stroke	(Japan) Ryuko Tokimatsu
6	12 Nov 2017	Mitsui Sumitomo Visa Taiheiyo Masters	−18 (63-72-70-65=270)	3 strokes	(Japan) Yūsaku Miyazato
7	2 Dec 2018	Golf Nippon Series JT Cup	−8 (66-74-68-64=272)	Playoff	(South Korea) Hwang Jung-gon, (Japan) Ryo Ishikawa
8	24 Aug 2025	ISPS Handa Summer Golf Battle	−24 (67-64-70-63=264)	1 stroke	(Japan) Ryuichi Oiwa

Japan Golf Tour playoff record (1–1)

No.	Year	Tournament	Opponents	Result
1	2017	Fujisankei Classic	(United States) Seungsu Han, (South Korea) Ryu Hyun-woo	Ryu won with par on first extra hole
2	2018	Golf Nippon Series JT Cup	(South Korea) Hwang Jung-gon, (Japan) Ryo Ishikawa	Won with birdie on first extra hole

=== Japan Challenge Tour wins (2) ===
No.	Date	Tournament	Winning score	Margin of victory	Runner(s)-up
1	20 Aug 2010	Hatoyama Country Club GMA Challenge Tournament (as an amateur)	−13 (64-67=131)	2 strokes	(Japan) Motoharu Mukai, (Japan) Norihiko Nakata
2	21 Sep 2012	PGA JGTO Challenge Cup II in Boso	−13 (64-67=131)	1 stroke	(Japan) Hisashi Sawada

== Results in major championships ==
Results not in chronological order in 2020.

Tournament	2013	2014	2015	2016	2017	2018
Masters Tournament						T28
U.S. Open					T46	CUT
The Open Championship	CUT			CUT		T35
PGA Championship					T48	T59

Tournament	2019	2020	2021	2022
Masters Tournament	61			
PGA Championship	CUT			
U.S. Open				CUT
The Open Championship		NT		

Did not play

CUT = missed the half-way cut
"T" = tied
NT = No tournament due to the COVID-19 pandemic

== Results in The Players Championship ==
Tournament	2018	2019
The Players Championship	CUT	CUT

CUT = missed the halfway cut

== Results in World Golf Championships ==
Results not in chronological order before 2015.

Tournament	2013	2014	2015	2016	2017	2018	2019
Championship						54	T51
Match Play						T59	T24
Invitational	T65				T47	T63	
Champions			71			T37	

Did not play

"T" = tied

== Team appearances ==
Amateur

- Eisenhower Trophy (representing Japan): 2010

Professional

- World Cup (representing Japan): 2018
- Amata Friendship Cup (representing Japan): 2018
