= Dunlop Phoenix Tournament =

Annual professional golf tournament in Japan

Coordinates: 31.55°N 131.25°E

Tournament information
- Location: Miyazaki, Miyazaki, Japan
- Established: 1972
- Course: Phoenix Country Club
- Par: 70
- Length: 7,117 yards (6,508 m)
- Tour: Japan Golf Tour
- Format: Stroke play
- Prize fund: ¥200,000,000
- Month played: November

Tournament record score
- Aggregate: 262 Max McGreevy (2024)
- To par: −22 as above

Current champion
- (United States) J. J. Spaun

Location map
- Location in Japan Location in the Miyazaki Prefecture

The Dunlop Phoenix Tournament (ダンロップフェニックストーナメント, Danroppu fenikkusu tōnamento) is a professional golf tournament on the Japan Golf Tour. It is played in November at the Phoenix Country Club in Miyazaki, Miyazaki and is one of the richest tournaments in Japan, attracting some of the leading international golfers.

== Winners ==
Year	Winner	Score	To par	Margin of victory	Runner(s)-up	Ref.
Dunlop Phoenix Tournament
2026	(United States) J. J. Spaun	264	−16	8 strokes	(Japan) Yusaku Hosono (Japan) Ryo Katsumata	
2025	(Japan) Yosuke Tsukada	267	−13	5 strokes	(Japan) Mikumu Horikawa (Japan) Riki Kawamoto (Japan) Tatsunori Shogenji	
2024	(United States) Max McGreevy	262	−22	4 strokes	(United States) Akshay Bhatia (Japan) Hideki Matsuyama (South Africa) Shaun Norris	
2023	(Japan) Yuta Sugiura (a)	272	−12	3 strokes	(Japan) Keita Nakajima (Japan) Taiga Semikawa	
2022	(Japan) Kazuki Higa	263	−21	3 strokes	(Chile) Mito Pereira	
2021	(United States) Chan Kim	267	−17	1 stroke	(Japan) Naoyuki Kataoka (Japan) Ryosuke Kinoshita	
2020	(Japan) Takumi Kanaya	271	−13	Playoff	(Japan) Toshihiro Ishizaka	
2019	(Japan) Shugo Imahira	203 (Note: Shortened to 54 holes due to thunderstorms.)	−10	2 strokes	(South Korea) Hwang Jung-gon	
2018	(Japan) Kodai Ichihara	269	−15	1 stroke	(Japan) Mikumu Horikawa	
2017	(United States) Brooks Koepka (2)	264	−20	9 strokes	(South Korea) Lee Sang-hee (Thailand) Prayad Marksaeng (United States) Xander Schauffele	
2016	(United States) Brooks Koepka	263	−21	1 stroke	(Japan) Yuta Ikeda	
2015	(Japan) Yūsaku Miyazato	270	−14	2 strokes	(Japan) Yoshinori Fujimoto (Japan) Hideki Matsuyama	
2014	(Japan) Hideki Matsuyama	269	−15	Playoff	(Japan) Hiroshi Iwata	
2013	(England) Luke Donald (2)	270	−14	6 strokes	(South Korea) Kim Hyung-sung	
2012	(England) Luke Donald	268	−16	5 strokes	(Japan) Hideki Matsuyama (a)	
2011	(Japan) Toshinori Muto	201	−12	4 strokes	(Spain) Gonzalo Fernández-Castaño	
2010	(Japan) Yuta Ikeda	269	−15	2 strokes	(South Korea) Kim Kyung-tae	
2009	(Italy) Edoardo Molinari	271	−13	Playoff	(Sweden) Robert Karlsson	
2008	(Thailand) Prayad Marksaeng	276	−8	1 stroke	(Japan) Ryo Ishikawa	
2007	(England) Ian Poulter	269	−11	3 strokes	(Spain) Gonzalo Fernández-Castaño	
2006	(Republic of Ireland) Pádraig Harrington	271	−9	Playoff	(United States) Tiger Woods	
2005	(United States) Tiger Woods (2)	272	−8	Playoff	(Japan) Kaname Yokoo	
2004	(United States) Tiger Woods	264	−16	8 strokes	(Japan) Ryoken Kawagishi	
2003	(Denmark) Thomas Bjørn (2)	272	−12	2 strokes	(Japan) Daisuke Maruyama	
2002	(Japan) Kaname Yokoo	269	−15	1 stroke	(Spain) Sergio García	
2001	(United States) David Duval	269	−15	Playoff	(Japan) Taichi Teshima	
2000	(Japan) Shingo Katayama	265	−19	4 strokes	(United States) Bob May	
1999	(Denmark) Thomas Bjørn	270	−14	Playoff	(Spain) Sergio García	
1998	(England) Lee Westwood	271	−13	3 strokes	(Northern Ireland) Darren Clarke	
1997	(United States) Tom Watson (2)	275	−9	2 strokes	(Japan) Naomichi Ozaki	
1996	(Japan) Masashi Ozaki (3)	277	−7	3 strokes	(Japan) Naomichi Ozaki (United States) Tom Watson	
1995	(Japan) Masashi Ozaki (2)	273	−11	1 stroke	(United States) Robert Gamez (United States) Brandt Jobe (Australia) Peter Senior	
1994	(Japan) Masashi Ozaki	201	−15	1 stroke	(United States) Tom Watson	
1993	(South Africa) Ernie Els	271	−17	4 strokes	(United States) Fred Couples (England) Barry Lane (Japan) Tsuneyuki Nakajima (Japan) Masashi Ozaki (Fiji) Vijay Singh	
1992	(South Africa) David Frost	277	−11	Playoff	(Japan) Kiyoshi Murota	
1991	(United States) Larry Nelson	276	−12	Playoff	(Japan) Isao Aoki (Spain) Seve Ballesteros (United States) Jay Don Blake	
1990	(United States) Larry Mize (2)	274	−14	3 strokes	(Japan) Naomichi Ozaki	
1989	(United States) Larry Mize	272	−16	4 strokes	(Japan) Naomichi Ozaki	
1988	(United States) Ken Green	273	−15	2 strokes	(United States) Fred Couples	
1987	(United States) Craig Stadler	277	−11	1 stroke	(United States) Scott Hoch	
1986	(United States) Bobby Wadkins (2)	277	−11	1 stroke	(Australia) Graham Marsh	
1985	(Japan) Tsuneyuki Nakajima	275	−13	3 strokes	(Spain) Seve Ballesteros (Taiwan) Chen Tze-chung	
1984	(United States) Scott Simpson	282	−6	Playoff	(West Germany) Bernhard Langer	
1983	(Taiwan) Chen Tze-ming	286	−2	Playoff	(United States) Tom Watson	
1982	(United States) Calvin Peete	281	−7	3 strokes	(Spain) Seve Ballesteros (United States) Larry Nelson	
1981	(Spain) Seve Ballesteros (2)	279	−9	3 strokes	(Japan) Tsuneyuki Nakajima	
1980	(United States) Tom Watson	282	−6	2 strokes	(United States) Mike Reid	
1979	(United States) Bobby Wadkins	284	−4	3 strokes	(Taiwan) Lu Liang-Huan (Japan) Namio Takasu	
1978	(United States) Andy Bean	275	−13	5 strokes	(Australia) Graham Marsh	
1977	(Spain) Seve Ballesteros	282	−6	1 stroke	(Japan) Kikuo Arai	
1976	(Australia) Graham Marsh	272	−16	6 strokes	(United States) Miller Barber	
1975	(United States) Hubert Green	272	−16	6 strokes	(Japan) Kosaku Shimada	
1974	(United States) Johnny Miller	274	−14	7 strokes	(Taiwan) Lu Liang-Huan	
ANA Phoenix Tournament
1973	(Japan) Yasuhiro Miyamoto	288	E	1 stroke	(Japan) Kazuo Yoshikawa	
Phoenix Tournament
1972	(Japan) Seiji Noda	289	+1	2 strokes	(Japan) Kosaku Shimada	

Note: Green highlight indicates scoring records.
