= Japan Golf Tour Championship =

Professional golf tournament

BMW Japan Golf Tour Championship Mori Building Cup
Tournament information
- Location: Kasama, Ibaraki, Japan
- Established: 2000
- Course: Shishido Hills Country Club
- Par: 71
- Length: 7,387 yards (6,755 m)
- Tour: Japan Golf Tour
- Format: Stroke play
- Prize fund: ¥150,000,000
- Month played: June

Tournament record score
- Aggregate: 268 Nobuhito Sato (2002)
- To par: −20 as above

Current champion
- (Japan) Hiroshi Iwata

Final champion
- Location in Japan Location in the Ibaraki Prefecture

The Japan Golf Tour Championship (日本ゴルフツアー選手権, Nihon gorufu tsuā senshuken) is a professional golf tournament on the Japan Golf Tour. Founded in 2000, it is one of the four major championships on the tour.

== Tournament hosts ==
The Japan Golf Tour Championship has been played at Shishido Hills Country Club since 2003. From 2000 to 2002, it was played at Horai Country Club.

== Prize money ==
Prize money was ¥120,000,000 from 2000 to 2005 and has been ¥150,000,000 since 2006, except for 2010 when it was ¥120,000,000. In 2000 the weather shortened the event to 54 holes and the prize money was reduced by 25% from ¥120,000,000 to ¥90,000,000.

== Winners ==
Year	Winner	Score	To par	Margin of victory	Runner(s)-up
BMW Japan Golf Tour Championship Mori Building Cup
2026	(Japan) Hiroshi Iwata (2)	274	−8	Playoff	(Japan) Naoyuki Kataoka (Hong Kong) Kho Taichi
2025	(Japan) Taiga Semikawa	272	−10	Playoff	(Japan) Mikumu Horikawa
2024	(Japan) Hiroshi Iwata	271	−13	Playoff	(Japan) Ryo Ishikawa
2023	(Japan) Takumi Kanaya	273	−11	2 strokes	(Japan) Yuki Inamori (Japan) Hiroshi Iwata
2022	(Japan) Kazuki Higa	272	−12	1 stroke	(Japan) Tomoharu Otsuki
Japan Golf Tour Championship Mori Building Cup Shishido Hills
2021	(Japan) Ryosuke Kinoshita	270	−14	5 strokes	(Japan) Yuki Furuwaka
2020	Cancelled due to COVID-19 pandemic				
2019	(Japan) Mikumu Horikawa	269	−15	4 strokes	(Japan) Shugo Imahira
2018	(Japan) Kodai Ichihara	272	−12	1 stroke	(Japan) Ryuko Tokimatsu
2017	(South Africa) Shaun Norris	271	−13	4 strokes	(United States) Seungsu Han
2016	(Japan) Yosuke Tsukada	282	−2	1 stroke	(New Zealand) Michael Hendry
2015	(China) Liang Wenchong	270	−14	5 strokes	(Australia) Brad Kennedy (Japan) Ryutaro Nagano (South Korea) Song Young-han
2014	(Japan) Yoshitaka Takeya	271	−17	2 strokes	(South Korea) Lee Sang-hee
Japan Golf Tour Championship Shishido Hills
2013	(Japan) Satoshi Kodaira	274	−14	1 stroke	(Thailand) Kiradech Aphibarnrat (South Korea) Hur Suk-ho
Japan Golf Tour Championship Citibank Cup Shishido Hills
2012	(Japan) Yoshinori Fujimoto	271	−13	2 strokes	(Japan) Masamichi Uehira
2011	(South Korea) Park Jae-bum	278	−6	1 stroke	(Japan) Daisuke Maruyama
2010	(Japan) Katsumasa Miyamoto (2)	279	−5	3 strokes	(Japan) Hiroyuki Fujita
UBS Japan Golf Tour Championship ShishidoHills
2009	(Japan) Yuji Igarashi	276	−8	1 stroke	(South Korea) Jang Ik-jae (New Zealand) David Smail (Japan) Toru Suzuki
2008	(Japan) Hidemasa Hoshino	272	−12	5 strokes	(Australia) Brendan Jones (Japan) Takao Nogami
2007	(Japan) Shingo Katayama	271	−9	1 stroke	(Japan) Naoya Takemoto
2006	(Japan) Tatsuhiko Takahashi	273	−7	3 strokes	(Japan) Tetsuji Hiratsuka
Japan Golf Tour Championship Shishido Hills Cup
2005	(Japan) Kazuhiko Hosokawa	273	−7	Playoff	(Japan) Yasuharu Imano (New Zealand) David Smail
2004	(South Korea) Hur Suk-ho	279	−5	Playoff	(Japan) Tomohiro Kondo
2003	(Japan) Toshimitsu Izawa (2)	270	−14	1 stroke	(New Zealand) David Smail (Japan) Tadahiro Takayama
Japan Golf Tour Championship iiyama Cup
2002	(Japan) Nobuhito Sato	268	−20	6 strokes	(Japan) Kenichi Kuboya
2001	(Japan) Katsumasa Miyamoto	273	−15	7 strokes	(Colombia) Eduardo Herrera (India) Jeev Milkha Singh
JGTO TPC iiyama Cup
2000	(Japan) Toshimitsu Izawa	203 (Note: Shortened to 54 holes due to weather.)	−13	3 strokes	(Japan) Kaname Yokoo

Note: Green highlight indicates scoring records.

== See also ==
- Japan PGA Championship
- Japan Open Golf Championship
- Golf Nippon Series JT Cup
