= Kodai Ichihara =

Japanese professional golfer (born 1982)

Personal information
- Nationality: Japan
- Born: 29 May 1982 (age 44) Tokyo, Japan
- Height: 1.71 m (5 ft 7 in)
- Weight: 80 kg (180 lb; 13 st)

Career
- Sport: Golf
- Turned professional: 2001
- Current tour: Japan Golf Tour
- Professional wins: 3

Number of wins by tour
- Japan Golf Tour: 2
- Other: 1

Best results in major championships
- Masters Tournament: DNP
- PGA Championship: DNP
- U.S. Open: CUT: 2019
- The Open Championship: T79: 2016

Kodai Ichihara (市原 弘大, Ichihara Kōdai; born 29 May 1982) is a Japanese professional golfer who plays on the Japan Golf Tour.

Ichihara had his first win on the tour in June 2018, the Japan Golf Tour Championship Mori Building Cup Shishido Hills. Previously his best finish is T-2 at the 2016 Gateway to The Open Mizuno Open. He also has one win on the Japan Challenge Tour, the 2003 Kanitop Cup.

Ichihara qualified for the 2012 Open Championship through International Final Qualifying, but missed the cut. His runner-up finish at the 2016 Mizuno Open qualified him for the 2016 Open Championship. He made the cut and finished tied for 79th. Ichihara's win at the 2018 Japan Golf Tour Championship lifted him to second place in the 2018 Japan Golf Tour money list, earning him a place in the 2018 Open Championship.

== Professional wins (3) ==
=== Japan Golf Tour wins (2) ===
Legend
Japan majors (1)
Other Japan Golf Tour (1)

No.	Date	Tournament	Winning score	Margin of victory	Runner-up
1	3 Jun 2018	Japan Golf Tour Championship; Mori Building Cup Shishido Hills	−12 (67-71-68-66=272)	1 stroke	(Japan) Ryuko Tokimatsu
2	18 Nov 2018	Dunlop Phoenix Tournament	−15 (70-68-68-63=269)	1 stroke	(Japan) Mikumu Horikawa

=== Japan Challenge Tour wins (1) ===
No.	Date	Tournament	Winning score	Margin of victory	Runner-up
1	20 Jul 2003	Kanitop Cup Challenge Tournament	−9 (70-65=135)	2 strokes	(Japan) Makoto Inoue

== Results in major championships ==
Tournament	2012	2013	2014	2015	2016	2017	2018
Masters Tournament							
U.S. Open							
The Open Championship	CUT				T79		CUT
PGA Championship							

Tournament	2019
Masters Tournament	
PGA Championship	
U.S. Open	CUT
The Open Championship	

Did not play

CUT = missed the half-way cut
"T" = tied

== Results in World Golf Championships ==
Tournament	2018	2019
Championship		
Match Play		
Invitational	T69	T55
Champions		

Did not play

"T" = Tied

== Team appearances ==
Professional

- Amata Friendship Cup (representing Japan): 2018
