= Dunlop Srixon Fukushima Open =

Golf tournament in Japan

Tournament information
- Location: Nishigō, Fukushima, Japan
- Established: 2014
- Course: Grandee Nasushirakawa Golf Club
- Par: 72
- Length: 6,961 yards (6,365 m)
- Tour: Japan Golf Tour
- Format: Stroke play
- Prize fund: ¥50,000,000
- Month played: June
- Final year: 2021

Tournament record score
- Aggregate: 263 Ryuko Tokimatsu (2016); 263 Ryosuke Kinoshita (2021); 263 Ryuko Tokimatsu (2021)
- To par: −25 as above

Current champion
- (Japan) Ryosuke Kinoshita

Final champion
- Location in Japan Location in the Fukushima Prefecture

The Dunlop Srixon Fukushima Open was a professional golf tournament on the Japan Golf Tour. It had always been played at the Grandee Nasushirakawa Golf Club in Nishigō, Fukushima. The prize fund in 2021 was ¥50,000,000, with ¥10,000,000 going to the winner.

== Winners ==
| Year | Winner | Score | To Par | Margin of victory | Runner(s)-up |
|---|---|---|---|---|---|
| 2021 | (Japan) Ryosuke Kinoshita | 263 | −25 | Playoff (Note: Kinoshita won with a birdie at the first extra hole.) | (Japan) Ryuko Tokimatsu |
| 2020 | Cancelled due to the COVID-19 pandemic | | | | |
| 2019 | (Japan) Rikuya Hoshino | 196 (Note: Shortened to 54 holes due to weather.) | −20 | 2 strokes | (Japan) Shota Akiyoshi |
| 2018 | (Japan) Shota Akiyoshi | 268 | −20 | 1 stroke | (Japan) Narutoshi Yamaoka |
| 2017 | (Japan) Katsumasa Miyamoto | 266 | −22 | 1 stroke | (South Korea) Hur In-hoi |
| 2016 | (Japan) Ryuko Tokimatsu | 263 | −25 | 3 strokes | (Japan) Takashi Iwamoto |
| 2015 | (Thailand) Prayad Marksaeng | 264 | −24 | 1 stroke | (South Korea) Song Young-han |
| 2014 | (Japan) Satoshi Kodaira | 272 | −16 | 2 strokes | (Japan) Yuki Inamori (Japan) Hiroshi Iwata (Japan) Ryosuke Kinoshita (Japan) Ryutaro Nagano (Japan) Kazuhiro Yamashita |
