= Shugo Imahira =

Japanese golfer (born 1992)

Personal information
- Nationality: Japan
- Born: 2 October 1992 (age 34) Saitama Prefecture, Japan
- Height: 1.65 m (5 ft 5 in)
- Weight: 60 kg (130 lb; 9.4 st)

Career
- Sport: Golf
- Turned professional: 2011
- Current tours: Japan Golf Tour; Asian Tour
- Professional wins: 14
- Highest ranking: 30 (5 January 2020) (as of 8 November 2026)

Number of wins by tour
- Japan Golf Tour: 11
- Asian Tour: 1
- Other: 3

Best results in major championships
- Masters Tournament: T44: 2020
- PGA Championship: CUT: 2018, 2019
- U.S. Open: 61st: 2020
- The Open Championship: CUT: 2016, 2019, 2022, 2025

Achievements and awards
- Japan Challenge Tour money list winner: 2014
- Japan Golf Tour money list winner: 2018, 2019
- Japan Golf Tour Most Valuable Player: 2018, 2019

Shugo Imahira (born 2 October 1992) is a Japanese professional golfer. He has played full-time on the Japan Golf Tour since 2015 and has won 10 times on the tour, between 2017 and 2024. He was the leading money winner in 2018 and 2019.

== Japan Challenge Tour ==
Imahira won twice on the 2014 Japan Challenge Tour en route to winning the season money list title.

== Japan Golf Tour ==
Since 2015 he has played on the main Japan Golf Tour. In 2015, his best finish was second place in the Shigeo Nagashima Invitational Sega Sammy Cup. In 2016, he tied for second place in the Gateway to The Open Mizuno Open and also had a third-place finish and three fourth-place finishes, finishing 10th in the money list. In 2017, he had his first win on the tour, winning the Kansai Open and finished 6th in the money list. Imahira won the 2018 Bridgestone Open. He was also 2nd three times, 3rd three times and had 7 other top-10 finishes to be the leading money winner on the 2018 Japan Golf Tour.

== Majors ==
Imahira played in the 2016 Open Championship for his first major appearance. He had an opening round 68, but shot 80 in the second round and missed the cut. He qualified for the 2017 U.S. Open and the 2018 PGA Championship but missed the cut on both occasions. Imahira was 53rd in the world rankings at the end of 2018 and missed out on qualification for the 2019 Masters Tournament, for which the top-50 qualified automatically. However, he later received a special invitation for the event. At the 2020 U.S. Open he did make the cut, but finished last among the remaining players.

== Amateur wins ==
this list may be incomplete

- 2008 Japan Junior Championship (Boy's 15–17 division)

== Professional wins (14) ==
=== Japan Golf Tour wins (11) ===
Legend
Japan majors (1)
Other Japan Golf Tour (10)

No.	Date	Tournament	Winning score	Margin of victory	Runner(s)-up
1	21 May 2017	Kansai Open Golf Championship	−9 (67-69-69-70=275)	6 strokes	(Japan) Daisuke Kataoka
2	21 Oct 2018	Bridgestone Open	−16 (70-65-67-66=268)	1 stroke	(Japan) Masahiro Kawamura
3	13 Oct 2019	Bridgestone Open (2)	−11 (64-67=131) (Note: Shortened to 36/54 holes due to weather.)	1 stroke	(Japan) Hiroyuki Fujita, (United States) Seungsu Han, (Japan) Tomoharu Otsuki, (Japan) Akio Sadakata
4	24 Nov 2019	Dunlop Phoenix Tournament	−10 (65-72-66=203)	2 strokes	(South Korea) Hwang Jung-gon
5	5 Sep 2021	Fujisankei Classic	−12 (71-69-68-64=272)	4 strokes	(Japan) Kenshiro Ikegami, (Japan) Ryo Ishikawa
6	15 May 2022	Asia Pacific Open Golf Championship Diamond Cup^{1}	−8 (66-69-69-68=272)	1 stroke	(Japan) Hiroshi Iwata, (Japan) Yuto Katsuragawa, (Japan) Kaito Onishi, (Japan) Kosuke Suzuki (a)
7	22 May 2022	Golf Partner Pro-Am Tournament	−22 (65-67-61-65=258)	Playoff	(Japan) Tomohiro Kondo, (Japan) Tomoharu Otsuki
8	2 Apr 2023	Token Homemate Cup	−20 (64-66-71-63=264)	2 strokes	(Japan) Rikuya Hoshino
9	12 Nov 2023	Mitsui Sumitomo Visa Taiheiyo Masters	−12 (67-66-65-70=268)	1 stroke	(Japan) Taiki Yoshida
10	13 Oct 2024	Japan Open Golf Championship	−4 (66-72-70-68=276)	1 stroke	(Japan) Ryosuke Kinoshita
11	15 Nov 2026	Mitsui Sumitomo Visa Taiheiyo Masters (2)	−14 (66-64-66=196)	4 strokes	(Japan) Yosuke Asaji, (Japan) Tomoyo Ikemura, (Japan) Riki Kawamoto

^{1}Co-sanctioned by the Asian Tour

Japan Golf Tour playoff record (1–1)

No.	Year	Tournament	Opponents	Result
1	2017	ANA Open	(Japan) Yuta Ikeda, (Japan) Ryuko Tokimatsu	Ikeda won with birdie on first extra hole
2	2022	Golf Partner Pro-Am Tournament	(Japan) Tomohiro Kondo, (Japan) Tomoharu Otsuki	Won with birdie on second extra hole Otsuki eliminated by par on first hole

=== Asian Tour wins (1) ===
No.	Date	Tournament	Winning score	Margin of victory	Runners-up
1	15 May 2022	Asia Pacific Open Golf Championship Diamond Cup^{1}	−8 (66-69-69-68=272)	1 stroke	(Japan) Hiroshi Iwata, (Japan) Yuto Katsuragawa, (Japan) Kaito Onishi, (Japan) Kosuke Suzuki (a)

^{1}Co-sanctioned by the Japan Golf Tour

=== Japan Challenge Tour wins (2) ===
No.	Date	Tournament	Winning score	Margin of victory	Runner(s)-up
1	23 May 2014	Heiwa PGM Challenge I Road to Championship	−10 (66-68=134)	Playoff	(Japan) Masashi Nishimura, (Japan) Akinori Tani
2	23 Oct 2014	JGTO Novil Final	−7 (68-69=137)	1 stroke	(Japan) Mitsugu Murakami

=== Other wins (1) ===
- 2018 Legend Charity Pro-Am

== Results in major championships ==
Results not in chronological order in 2020.

Tournament	2016	2017	2018
Masters Tournament			
U.S. Open		CUT	
The Open Championship	CUT		
PGA Championship			CUT

Tournament	2019	2020	2021	2022	2023	2024	2025
Masters Tournament	CUT	T44					
PGA Championship	CUT						
U.S. Open	CUT	61					
The Open Championship	CUT	NT		CUT			CUT

Did not play

CUT = missed the half-way cut
"T" = tied
NT = no tournament due to the COVID-19 pandemic

== Results in World Golf Championships ==
Tournament	2017	2018	2019	2020
Championship			T39	T61
Match Play				NT^{1}
Invitational			T27	
Champions	DQ			NT^{1}

^{1}Cancelled due to COVID-19 pandemic

Did not play

QF, R16, R32, R64 = Round in which player lost in match play
DQ = Disqualified
NT = No tournament
"T" = Tied

== See also ==
- List of golfers with most Japan Golf Tour wins
