= Shota Akiyoshi =

Japanese professional golfer

Personal information
- Nationality: Japan
- Born: 22 July 1990 (age 36) Kumamoto, Japan
- Height: 1.75 m (5 ft 9 in)
- Weight: 85 kg (187 lb; 13.4 st)

Career
- Sport: Golf
- Status: Professional
- Current tour: Japan Golf Tour
- Professional wins: 6

Number of wins by tour
- Japan Golf Tour: 2
- Other: 4

Best results in major championships
- Masters Tournament: DNP
- PGA Championship: DNP
- U.S. Open: CUT: 2018
- The Open Championship: CUT: 2018

Shota Akiyoshi (秋吉 翔太, Akiyoshi Shōta; born 22 July 1990) is a Japanese professional golfer who plays on the Japan Golf Tour.

Akiyoshi won twice on the 2018 Japan Golf Tour, the Gateway to The Open Mizuno Open and the Dunlop Srixon Fukushima Open. His win in the Mizuno Open gave an entry to the 2018 Open Championship. He also qualified for the 2018 U.S. Open through sectional qualifying in Japan. He missed the cut in both his major starts.

Akiyoshi also has three wins on the Japan Challenge Tour.

== Professional wins (6) ==
=== Japan Golf Tour wins (2) ===
No.	Date	Tournament	Winning score	Margin of victory	Runner(s)-up
1	27 May 2018	Gateway to The Open Mizuno Open	−1 (72-71-74-70=287)	1 stroke	(New Zealand) Michael Hendry, (Japan) Masahiro Kawamura, (Japan) Masanori Kobayashi
2	24 Jun 2018	Dunlop Srixon Fukushima Open	−20 (67-71-66-64=268)	1 stroke	(Japan) Narutoshi Yamaoka

=== Japan Challenge Tour wins (3) ===
No.	Date	Tournament	Winning score	Margin of victory	Runner(s)-up
1	10 Jul 2014	ISPS Charity Challenge Tournament	−19 (64-66-64=194)	2 strokes	(Japan) Ryuko Tokimatsu
2	18 Sep 2015	Seven Dreamers Challenge	−4 (68)	Playoff	(Japan) Akira Endo, (Japan) Tomokazu Yoshinaga
3	10 Oct 2015	Everyone Project Challenge Golf Tournament	−5 (69-68=137)	1 stroke	(Japan) Yasunobu Fukunaga

=== Other wins (1) ===
- 2020 Kyusyu Open

== Results in major championships ==
Tournament	2018
Masters Tournament	
U.S. Open	CUT
The Open Championship	CUT
PGA Championship	

Did not play

CUT = missed the halfway cut
