= Yosuke Asaji =

Japanese professional golfer

Personal information
- Nationality: Japan
- Born: 24 May 1993 (age 33) Tokyo, Japan
- Height: 1.69 m (5 ft 7 in)
- Weight: 68 kg (150 lb)

Career
- Sport: Golf
- Turned professional: 2011
- Current tours: Japan Golf Tour; Asian Tour
- Former tour: Japan Challenge Tour
- Professional wins: 7

Number of wins by tour
- Japan Golf Tour: 4
- Asian Tour: 2
- Other: 2

Best results in major championships
- Masters Tournament: DNP
- PGA Championship: DNP
- U.S. Open: CUT: 2021
- The Open Championship: T67: 2019

Yosuke Asaji (born 24 May 1993) is a Japanese professional golfer.

== Professional career ==
Asaji won the 2019 Asia-Pacific Diamond Cup Golf (a co-sanctioned event with the Asian Tour), to qualify for the 2019 Open Championship. He earned entry into that tournament through Monday qualifier. He finished the 2019 Open Championship in a tie for 67th place. Later in 2019 he won a five-way playoff at the ANA Open after making a birdie at the first extra hole.

Asaji has two wins on the Japan Challenge Tour.

In November 2025, Asaji won the Moutai Singapore Open, defeating Wang Jeung-hun in a playoff for his second Asian Tour victory.

== Professional wins (7) ==
=== Japan Golf Tour wins (4) ===
No.	Date	Tournament	Winning score	Margin of victory	Runners-up
1	12 May 2019	Asia-Pacific Diamond Cup Golf^{1}	−3 (69-72-68-72=281)	1 stroke	(United States) Micah Lauren Shin, (Japan) Ren Yonezawa (a)
2	15 Sep 2019	ANA Open	−16 (73-68-66-65=272)	Playoff	(United States) Seungsu Han, (Japan) Terumichi Kakazu, (South Africa) Shaun Norris, (Japan) Ryuko Tokimatsu
3	7 Nov 2021	Mynavi ABC Championship	−16 (69-67-68-68=272)	2 strokes	(Japan) Mikumu Horikawa, (Japan) Tomohiro Ishizaka
4	4 May 2025	The Crowns	−7 (70-72-62-69=273)	1 stroke	(Japan) Hiroshi Iwata, (Japan) Yūsaku Miyazato

^{1}Co-sanctioned by the Asian Tour

Japan Golf Tour playoff record (1–0)

No.	Year	Tournament	Opponents	Result
1	2019	ANA Open	(United States) Seungsu Han, (Japan) Terumichi Kakazu, (South Africa) Shaun Norris, (Japan) Ryuko Tokimatsu	Won with birdie on first extra hole

=== Asian Tour wins (2) ===
Legend
International Series (1)
Other Asian Tour (1)

No.	Date	Tournament	Winning score	Margin of victory	Runner(s)-up
1	12 May 2019	Asia-Pacific Diamond Cup Golf^{1}	−3 (69-72-68-72=281)	1 stroke	(United States) Micah Lauren Shin, (Japan) Ren Yonezawa (a)
2	9 Nov 2025	Moutai Singapore Open	−19 (67-70-65-67=269)	Playoff	(South Korea) Wang Jeung-hun

^{1}Co-sanctioned by the Japan Golf Tour

Asian Tour playoff record (1–0)

No.	Year	Tournament	Opponent	Result
1	2025	Moutai Singapore Open	(South Korea) Wang Jeung-hun	Won with birdie on first extra hole

=== Japan Challenge Tour wins (2) ===
No.	Date	Tournament	Winning score	Margin of victory	Runner-up
1	7 Jun 2012	ISPS Charity Challenge Tournament	−17 (65-69-65=199)	8 strokes	(Japan) Makoto Inoue
2	19 Jun 2015	Musee Platinum Challenge Tournament	−11 (66-67=133)	Playoff	(Japan) Sushi Ishigaki

== Results in major championships ==
Results not in chronological order in 2020.

Tournament	2019	2020	2021
Masters Tournament			
PGA Championship			
U.S. Open			CUT
The Open Championship	T67	NT	

Did not play

"T" indicates a tie for a place
NT = No tournament due to COVID-19 pandemic

== Results in World Golf Championships ==
Tournament	2019
Championship	
Match Play	
Invitational	
Champions	T38

Did not play

"T" = Tied
