= 2018 Japan Golf Tour =

Golf tour season

2018 Japan Golf Tour season
- Duration: 18 January 2018 – 2 December 2018
- Number of official events: 24 (Note: One further tournament was scheduled but was cancelled.)
- Most wins: (Japan) Kodai Ichihara (2)
- Money list: (Japan) Shugo Imahira
- Most Valuable Player: (Japan) Shugo Imahira
- Rookie of the Year: (Japan) Rikuya Hoshino

The 2018 Japan Golf Tour was the 46th season of the Japan Golf Tour (formerly the PGA of Japan Tour), the main professional golf tour in Japan since it was formed in 1973.

== Schedule ==
The following table lists official events during the 2018 season.

Date	Tournament	Location	Purse (¥)	Winner (Note: The number in brackets after each winner's name is the number of Japan Golf Tour events they had won up to and including that tournament. This information is only shown for Japan Golf Tour members.)	OWGR points	Other tours (Note: ASA − Asian Tour.)	Notes
21 Jan	SMBC Singapore Open	Singapore	US$1,000,000	(Spain) Sergio García (n/a)	28	ASA	
28 Jan	Leopalace21 Myanmar Open	Myanmar	US$750,000	(United States) Paul Peterson (1)	19	ASA	
15 Apr	Token Homemate Cup	Mie	130,000,000	(Japan) Atomu Shigenaga (1)	16		
22 Apr	Panasonic Open Golf Championship	Osaka	150,000,000	(India) Rahil Gangjee (1)	15	ASA	
29 Apr	The Crowns	Aichi	120,000,000	(South Korea) Yang Yong-eun (5)	16		
13 May	Japan PGA Championship	Chiba	150,000,000	(Japan) Toru Taniguchi (20)	16		Japan major
20 May	Kansai Open Golf Championship	Hyōgo	70,000,000	(Japan) Ryuko Tokimatsu (3)	16		
27 May	Gateway to The Open Mizuno Open	Ibaraki	100,000,000	(Japan) Shota Akiyoshi (1)	16		
3 Jun	Japan Golf Tour Championship; Mori Building Cup Shishido Hills	Ibaraki	150,000,000	(Japan) Kodai Ichihara (1)	16		Japan major
24 Jun	Dunlop Srixon Fukushima Open	Fukushima	50,000,000	(Japan) Shota Akiyoshi (2)	16		
8 Jul	Shigeo Nagashima Invitational Sega Sammy Cup	Hokkaidō	150,000,000	(Australia) Brad Kennedy (3)	16		
26 Aug	RIZAP KBC Augusta	Fukuoka	100,000,000	(Japan) Daijiro Izumida (1)	16		
2 Sep	Fujisankei Classic	Yamanashi	110,000,000	(Japan) Rikuya Hoshino (1)	16		
9 Sep (Note: First two rounds played in July.)	ISPS Handa Match Play	Saitama	230,000,000	(Thailand) Thanyakon Khrongpha (1)	16		
~~16 Sep~~	ANA Open	Hokkaidō	–	Cancelled (Note: Cancelled due to the Hokkaido Eastern Iburi earthquake.)	–		
23 Sep	Asia-Pacific Diamond Cup Golf	Saitama	150,000,000	(Japan) Yuta Ikeda (20)	15	ASA	
30 Sep	Top Cup Tokai Classic	Aichi	110,000,000	(Philippines) Angelo Que (1)	16		
14 Oct	Japan Open Golf Championship	Kanagawa	200,000,000	(Japan) Yuki Inamori (1)	32		Flagship event (Note: Also a Japan major championship.)
21 Oct	Bridgestone Open	Chiba	150,000,000	(Japan) Shugo Imahira (2)	16		
28 Oct	Mynavi ABC Championship	Hyōgo	150,000,000	(Japan) Yuta Kinoshita (1)	16		
4 Nov	Heiwa PGM Championship	Okinawa	200,000,000	(South Africa) Shaun Norris (3)	16		
11 Nov	Mitsui Sumitomo Visa Taiheiyo Masters	Shizuoka	200,000,000	(Japan) Tatsunori Nukaga (1)	18		
18 Nov	Dunlop Phoenix Tournament	Miyazaki	200,000,000	(Japan) Kodai Ichihara (2)	30		
25 Nov	Casio World Open	Kōchi	200,000,000	(South Korea) Choi Ho-sung (2)	16		
2 Dec	Golf Nippon Series JT Cup	Tokyo	130,000,000	(Japan) Satoshi Kodaira (7)	17		Japan major

=== Unofficial events ===
The following events were sanctioned by the Japan Golf Tour, but did not carry official money, nor were wins official.

Date	Tournament	Location	Purse (¥)	Winner(s)	OWGR points	Other tours	Notes
8 Apr	Masters Tournament	United States	US$11,000,000	(United States) Patrick Reed	100		Major championship
6 May	Legend Charity Pro-Am	Chiba	50,000,000	(Japan) Shugo Imahira	n/a		Pro-Am
17 Jun	U.S. Open	United States	US$12,000,000	(United States) Brooks Koepka	100		Major championship
22 Jul	The Open Championship	Scotland	US$10,500,000	(Italy) Francesco Molinari	100		Major championship
12 Aug	PGA Championship	United States	US$11,000,000	(United States) Brooks Koepka	100		Major championship
9 Dec	Hitachi 3Tours Championship	Chiba	57,000,000	Japan PGA Senior Tour	n/a		Team event

== Money list ==
The money list was based on prize money won during the season, calculated in Japanese yen.

Position	Player	Prize money (¥)
1	(Japan) Shugo Imahira	139,119,332
2	(South Africa) Shaun Norris	103,942,450
3	(Japan) Yuki Inamori	85,301,742
4	(Japan) Kodai Ichihara	82,245,918
5	(Japan) Yuta Ikeda	79,671,825

== Awards ==
Award	Winner	Ref.
Most Valuable Player	(Japan) Shugo Imahira	
Rookie of the Year (Shimada Trophy)	(Japan) Rikuya Hoshino	

== Japan Challenge Tour ==
2018 Japan Challenge Tour season
- Duration: 30 March 2018 – 26 October 2018
- Number of official events: 12
- Most wins: (Japan) Taihei Sato (2)
- Money list: (Japan) Taihei Sato

The 2018 Japan Challenge Tour, titled as the 2018 AbemaTV Tour for sponsorship reasons, was the 34th season of the Japan Challenge Tour, the official development tour to the Japan Golf Tour.

=== AbemaTV title sponsorship ===
In January, it was announced that the tour had signed a title sponsorship agreement with AbemaTV, being renamed as the AbemaTV Tour.

=== Schedule ===
The following table lists official events during the 2018 season.

Date	Tournament	Location	Purse (¥)	Winner (Note: The number in brackets after each winner's name is the number of Japan Challenge Tour events they had won up to and including that tournament. It is rare for someone to accumulate many wins on the Japan Challenge Tour as success at this level usually leads to promotion to the Japan Golf Tour.)
1 Apr	Novil Cup	Tokushima	15,000,000	(South Korea) Park Bae-jong (1)
20 Apr	i Golf Shaper Challenge	Fukuoka	15,000,000	(Japan) Naoto Takayanagi (1)
27 Apr	Japan Create Challenge	Fukuoka	15,000,000	(Japan) Shoji Kawai (1)
18 May	Heiwa PGM Challenge I Road to Championship	Ibaraki	15,000,000	(Japan) Keisuke Kondo (1)
8 Jun	ISPS Handa Challenge Cup	Chiba	20,000,000	(Japan) Ryosuke Kinoshita (1)
22 Jun	Landic Challenge	Fukuoka	15,000,000	(Japan) Taihei Sato (1)
29 Jun	Minami Akita CC Michinoku Challenge	Akita	15,000,000	(Japan) Kazuki Higa (1)
14 Sep	Heiwa PGM Challenge II Road to Championship	Tottori	15,000,000	(United States) Dodge Kemmer (1)
21 Sep	Elite Grips Challenge	Hyōgo	15,000,000	(Japan) Taihei Sato (2)
6 Oct	Ryo Ishikawa Everyone Project Challenge	Tochigi	15,000,000	(Japan) Taiji Maekawa (1)
19 Oct	Taiheiyo Club Challenge Tournament	Saitama	15,000,000	(Japan) Tomohiro Umeyama (2)
26 Oct	JGTO Novil Final	Ibaraki	15,000,000	(Japan) Yuki Kono (3)

=== Money list ===
The money list was based on prize money won during the season, calculated in Japanese yen. The top 20 players on the money list earned status to play on the 2019 Japan Golf Tour.

Position	Player	Prize money (¥)
1	(Japan) Taihei Sato	7,256,163
2	(Japan) Tomohiro Umeyama	5,338,803
3	(Japan) Naoto Takayanagi	4,813,256
4	(Japan) Ryosuke Kinoshita	4,251,987
5	(Japan) Takaya Onoda	3,736,339
