= Ryutaro Nagano =

Japanese golfer

Ryutaro Nagano 永野 竜太郎
Personal information
- Nationality: Japan
- Born: 6 May 1988 (age 38) Mashiki, Kumamoto, Japan
- Height: 1.81 m (5 ft 11 in)
- Weight: 85 kg (187 lb)

Career
- Sport: Golf
- College: Tohoku Fukushi University
- Turned professional: 2008
- Current tour: Japan Golf Tour

Best results in major championships
- Masters Tournament: DNP
- PGA Championship: DNP
- U.S. Open: T20: 2023
- The Open Championship: CUT: 2021, 2026
Medal record
Summer Universiade
Bronze medal – third place	2007 Bangkok	Men's team

Ryutaro Nagano (永野 竜太郎, Nagano Ryūtarō; born 6 May 1988) is a Japanese professional golfer. He plays on the Japan Golf Tour where he has five runner-up finishes.

== Amateur career ==
Nagano was born in the Kumamoto Prefecture and as a child honed his skills at a driving range built on his grandfather's ranch. He won the club championship at Kumamoto Airport CC as a freshman in junior high school. In 2005, he came to national attention when he reached the final of the Japan Amateur as a sophomore at Mizuki High School in Ibaraki Prefecture. The next year, he won the National High School Golf Championship.

In 2007, he enrolled at Tohoku Fukushi University. He represented Ibaraki Prefecture at the 62nd National Athletic Meet golf competition, and won the adult men's section and team.

He won a bronze medal with Yuta Ikeda, Yuki Usami and Daisuke Yasumoto at the 2007 Summer Universiade in Bangkok.

== Professional career ==
Nagano turned professional at the end of 2008 when he was a sophomore at Tohoku Fukushi University. Expectations were high for him as a rookie, but he struggled for his first three years on the Japan Golf Tour.

In 2012, he recorded a few top-10s, and in 2014 he finished runner-up at the Dunlop Srixon Fukushima Open, two shots behind Satoshi Kodaira. He was again runner-up at the 2015 Japan Golf Tour Championship. In 2016, his form continued to improve and he moved up to 18th in the season ranking, and into the top-250 in the Official World Golf Ranking. In 2017, he recorded his third runner-up finish at the Mynavi ABC Championship.

He was a torch bearer at the 2020 Tokyo Olympic Games, carrying the torch through Kumamoto, his hometown.

Nagano qualified for his first major, the 2021 Open Championship, by finishing runner-up at the Gateway to The Open Mizuno Open. He shot a 70 and 72 at to miss the cut at Royal St George's Golf Club by a single stroke. Later the same year, he tied for 39th at the Zozo Championship in his first regular PGA Tour start, won by Hideki Matsuyama.

He bogeyed the final hole to enter a playoff at the 2021 Panasonic Open Golf Championship with world number one ranked amateur Keita Nakajima, which he lost, but could claim the 20 million yen winner's check.

Nagano earned a spot at the 2023 U.S. Open in the Japan qualifying event at Ibaraki Golf Club alongside Gunn Charoenkul and Ryo Ishikawa. At Los Angeles Country Club, he gained recognition by sitting in 8th place after three rounds, and finishing in a tie for 20th.

== Amateur wins ==
- 2006 National High School Golf Championship
- 2007 National Athletic Meet Golf Championship

== Playoff record ==
Japan Golf Tour playoff record (0–1)

No.	Year	Tournament	Opponent	Result
1	2021	Panasonic Open	(Japan) Keita Nakajima (a)	Lost to par on first extra hole

== Results in major championships ==
Tournament	2021	2022	2023	2024	2025	2026
Masters Tournament						
PGA Championship						
U.S. Open			T20			
The Open Championship	CUT					CUT

Did not play

CUT = missed the half-way cut
"T" = tied
