= Steyn City Championship =

Coordinates: 25.771°S 27.854°E

Tournament information
- Location: Midrand, South Africa
- Established: 2022
- Course: The Club at Steyn City
- Par: 72
- Length: 7,716 yards (7,056 m)
- Tours: European Tour; Sunshine Tour
- Format: Stroke play
- Prize fund: US$1,500,000
- Month played: March
- Final year: 2022

Tournament record score
- Aggregate: 263 Shaun Norris (2022)
- To par: −25 as above

Final champion
- (South Africa) Shaun Norris

Location map
- Location in South Africa Location in Gauteng

The Steyn City Championship was a professional golf tournament held at The Club at Steyn City, in Midrand, South Africa.

The tournament was introduced for the 2022 season as a co-sanctioned European Tour and Sunshine Tour event.

Shaun Norris won the inaugural event, scoring 25-under-par for four rounds. He beat Dean Burmester by three shots.

== Winners ==
Year	Tours (Note: AFR − Sunshine Tour; EUR − European Tour.)	Winner	Score	To par	Margin of victory	Runner-up
2022	AFR, EUR	(South Africa) Shaun Norris	263	−25	3 strokes	(South Africa) Dean Burmester
