= Yosuke Tsukada =

Japanese professional golfer (born 1985)

Personal information
- Nationality: Japan
- Born: 24 May 1985 (age 41) Nagano Prefecture, Japan
- Height: 1.73 m (5 ft 8 in)
- Weight: 80 kg (180 lb; 13 st)

Career
- Sport: Golf
- Turned professional: 2008
- Current tour: Japan Golf Tour
- Professional wins: 2

Number of wins by tour
- Japan Golf Tour: 2

Best results in major championships
- Masters Tournament: DNP
- PGA Championship: DNP
- U.S. Open: DNP
- The Open Championship: CUT: 2016

Yosuke Tsukada (塚田 陽亮, Tsukada Yōsuke; born 24 May 1985) is a Japanese professional golfer.

Tsukada plays on the Japan Golf Tour. He won his first title in 2016 at the Japan Golf Tour Championship.

== Professional wins (2) ==
=== Japan Golf Tour wins (2) ===
Legend
Japan majors (1)
Other Japan Golf Tour (1)

No.	Date	Tournament	Winning score	Margin of victory	Runner(s)-up
1	5 Jun 2016	Japan Golf Tour Championship; Mori Building Cup Shishido Hills	−2 (73-74-69-66=282)	1 stroke	(New Zealand) Michael Hendry
2	23 Nov 2025	Dunlop Phoenix Tournament	−13 (67-66-67-67=267)	5 strokes	(Japan) Mikumu Horikawa, (Japan) Riki Kawamoto, (Japan) Tatsunori Shogenji

== Results in major championships ==
Tournament	2016
Masters Tournament	
U.S. Open	
The Open Championship	CUT
PGA Championship	

Did not play

CUT = missed the halfway cut

== Results in World Golf Championships ==
Tournament	2015
Championship	
Match Play	
Invitational	57
Champions	

Did not play
