= Shaun Norris (golfer) =

South African professional golfer (born 1982)

Personal information
- Full name: Shaun Patrick Norris
- Nationality: South Africa
- Born: 14 May 1982 (age 44) Johannesburg, South Africa
- Height: 1.88 m (6 ft 2 in)
- Weight: 82 kg (181 lb; 12.9 st)
- Spouse: Candy Norris
- Children: 2

Career
- Sport: Golf
- Turned professional: 2002
- Current tours: European Tour; Japan Golf Tour; Sunshine Tour
- Former tours: Asian Tour; LIV Golf; Tarheel Tour
- Professional wins: 15
- Highest ranking: 54 (19 January 2020) (as of 25 October 2026)

Number of wins by tour
- European Tour: 2
- Japan Golf Tour: 9
- Asian Tour: 2
- Sunshine Tour: 4
- Other: 1

Best results in major championships
- Masters Tournament: DNP
- PGA Championship: T71: 2022
- U.S. Open: CUT: 2020, 2022
- The Open Championship: T53: 2026

Achievements and awards
- Japan Golf Tour Rookie of the Year: 2016
- Sunshine Tour Order of Merit winner: 2021–22

Shaun Patrick Norris (born 14 May 1982) is a South African professional golfer.

== Career ==
Norris plays on the Sunshine Tour where he has won twice. He won the inaugural Africa Open in 2008 and the Nashua Masters in 2011.

After graduating from qualifying school, he also began playing in the European Tour in 2011. He has also played on the Asian Tour and the Japan Golf Tour, winning five times, including the Japan Golf Tour Championship Mori Building Cup Shishido Hills in 2017. He also won the Japan Open Golf Championship in 2021.

In March 2022, Norris claimed his first European Tour win at the Steyn City Championship, a co-sanctioned European and Sunshine Tour event. He shot rounds of 64 and 62 on the way to beating Dean Burmester by three shots. In May, Norris claimed the Sunshine Tour Order of Merit for the 2021–22 season.

In December 2024, Norris won the season-ending Golf Nippon Series JT Cup for his seventh on the Japan Golf Tour. Two weeks later, he won the Alfred Dunhill Championship for his second European Tour victory.

== Professional wins (15) ==
=== European Tour wins (2) ===
No.	Date	Tournament	Winning score	Margin of victory	Runner(s)-up
1	20 Mar 2022	Steyn City Championship^{1}	−25 (64-62-67-70=263)	3 strokes	(South Africa) Dean Burmester
2	15 Dec 2024 (2025 season)	Alfred Dunhill Championship^{1}	−13 (67-70-71-67=275)	1 stroke	(Sweden) Marcus Kinhult, (England) John Parry, (South Africa) Ryan van Velzen

^{1}Co-sanctioned by the Sunshine Tour

European Tour playoff record (0–2)

No.	Year	Tournament	Opponent(s)	Result
1	2025	Joburg Open	(Scotland) Calum Hill, (South Africa) Jacques Kruyswijk	Hill won with par on second extra hole
2	2025	Alfred Dunhill Championship	(South Africa) Jayden Schaper	Lost to eagle on first extra hole

=== Japan Golf Tour wins (9) ===
Legend
Flagship events (1)
Japan majors (3) (Note: The 2021 Japan Open Golf Championship was also a Japan major championship.)
Other Japan Golf Tour (6)

No.	Date	Tournament	Winning score	Margin of victory	Runner(s)-up
1	7 Feb 2016	Leopalace21 Myanmar Open^{1}	−24 (66-66-61-71=264)	4 strokes	(South Korea) Park Jun-won, (Japan) Azuma Yano
2	4 Jun 2017	Japan Golf Tour Championship; Mori Building Cup Shishido Hills	−13 (67-72-68-64=271)	4 strokes	(United States) Seungsu Han
3	4 Nov 2018	Heiwa PGM Championship	−14 (68-65-69=202) (Note: Shortened to 54 holes due to weather.)	1 stroke	(Japan) Daisuke Kataoka
4	4 Nov 2019	Tokai Classic	−9 (68-69-66-72=275)	1 stroke	(Japan) Shota Akiyoshi, (Japan) Ryuko Tokimatsu
5	23 May 2021	Golf Partner Pro-Am Tournament	−21 (60-68-68-63=259)	Playoff	(Japan) Tomoharu Otsuki, (Zimbabwe) Scott Vincent
6	17 Oct 2021	Japan Open Golf Championship	−19 (67-64-64-70=265)	4 strokes	(Japan) Yuta Ikeda
7	1 Dec 2024	Golf Nippon Series JT Cup	−12 (67-68-65-68=268)	2 strokes	(Japan) Naoyuki Kataoka
8	15 Jun 2025	Hana Bank Invitational^{2}	−18 (66-69-69-66=270)	Playoff	(Japan) Yusuke Sakamoto
9	31 May 2026	Gateway to The Open Mizuno Open	−24 (63-69-67-65=264)	5 strokes	(Japan) Ryutaro Nagano, (Japan) Ren Yonezawa

^{1}Co-sanctioned by the Asian Tour
^{2}Co-sanctioned by the Korean Tour

Japan Golf Tour playoff record (2–1)

No.	Year	Tournament	Opponent(s)	Result
1	2019	ANA Open	(Japan) Yosuke Asaji, (United States) Seungsu Han, (Japan) Terumichi Kakazu, (Japan) Ryuko Tokimatsu	Asaji won with birdie on first extra hole
2	2021	Golf Partner Pro-Am Tournament	(Japan) Tomoharu Otsuki, (Zimbabwe) Scott Vincent	Won with par on second extra hole Otsuki eliminated by par on first hole
3	2025	Hana Bank Invitational	(Japan) Yusuke Sakamoto	Won with birdie on second extra hole

=== Asian Tour wins (2) ===
No.	Date	Tournament	Winning score	Margin of victory	Runner(s)-up
1	11 Oct 2015	Yeangder Tournament Players Championship^{1}	−12 (68-68-68=204)	2 strokes	(Philippines) Miguel Tabuena
2	7 Feb 2016	Leopalace21 Myanmar Open^{2}	−24 (66-66-61-71=264)	4 strokes	(South Korea) Park Jun-won, (Japan) Azuma Yano

^{1}Co-sanctioned by the Taiwan PGA Tour
^{2}Co-sanctioned by the Japan Golf Tour

=== Sunshine Tour wins (4) ===
No.	Date	Tournament	Winning score	Margin of victory	Runner(s)-up
1	10 Feb 2008	Africa Open	−13 (68-69-70-68=275)	6 strokes	(South Africa) Nic Henning
2	6 Nov 2011	Nashua Masters	−9 (68-73-65-65=271)	1 stroke	(South Africa) Tyrone Mordt
3	20 Mar 2022	Steyn City Championship^{1}	−25 (64-62-67-70=263)	3 strokes	(South Africa) Dean Burmester
4	15 Dec 2024	Alfred Dunhill Championship^{1}	−13 (67-70-71-67=275)	1 stroke	(Sweden) Marcus Kinhult, (England) John Parry, (South Africa) Ryan van Velzen

^{1}Co-sanctioned by the European Tour

Sunshine Tour playoff record (0–2)

No.	Year	Tournament	Opponent(s)	Result
1	2025	Joburg Open	(Scotland) Calum Hill, (South Africa) Jacques Kruyswijk	Hill won with par on second extra hole
2	2025	Alfred Dunhill Championship	(South Africa) Jayden Schaper	Lost to eagle on first extra hole

=== Tarheel Tour wins (1) ===
No.	Date	Tournament	Winning score	Margin of victory	Runners-up
1	14 Jul 2007	Southern Open	−20 (63-66-67=196)	4 strokes	(United States) Matt Cannon, (United States) William McGirt

== Results in major championships ==
Results not in chronological order in 2020.

Tournament	2017	2018
Masters Tournament		
U.S. Open		
The Open Championship	T62	T61
PGA Championship		

Tournament	2019	2020	2021	2022	2023	2024	2025	2026
Masters Tournament								
PGA Championship	CUT	CUT		T71				
U.S. Open		CUT		CUT				
The Open Championship	CUT	NT	CUT	CUT			CUT	T53

Did not play

CUT = missed the half-way cut
"T" = tied
NT = no tournament due to COVID-19 pandemic

== Results in World Golf Championships ==
Tournament	2017	2018	2019	2020
Championship			71	T37
Match Play				NT^{1}
Invitational	71			T75
Champions				NT^{1}

^{1}Cancelled due to COVID-19 pandemic

Did not play

NT = No tournament
"T" = Tied

== Team appearances ==
Amateur

- Eisenhower Trophy (representing South Africa): 2002

== See also ==
- 2010 European Tour Qualifying School graduates
