= Ryosuke Kinoshita =

Japanese professional golfer

Personal information
- Nationality: Japan
- Born: 16 July 1991 (age 35) Nara Prefecture, Japan
- Height: 1.74 m (5 ft 9 in)
- Weight: 75 kg (165 lb; 11.8 st)

Career
- Sport: Golf
- Turned professional: 2013
- Current tours: Japan Golf Tour; Asian Tour
- Former tours: European Tour; Japan Challenge Tour; LIV Golf
- Professional wins: 4
- Highest ranking: 69 (2 January 2022) (as of 25 October 2026)

Number of wins by tour
- Japan Golf Tour: 3
- Other: 1

Best results in major championships
- Masters Tournament: DNP
- PGA Championship: CUT: 2022
- U.S. Open: DNP
- The Open Championship: T59: 2021

Ryosuke Kinoshita (born 16 July 1991) is a Japanese professional golfer. He has played primarily on the Japan Golf Tour since 2014 and has won three times on the tour.

== Professional career ==
Kinoshita turned professional in late 2013. From 2014 to 2018, he played on the Japan Golf Tour and the second-tier Japan Challenge Tour. In his first season, 2014, he was a joint runner-up in the Dunlop Srixon Fukushima Open, two strokes behind Satoshi Kodaira. In 2018, he won the ISPS Handa Challenge Cup on the Japan Challenge Tour, by two strokes. In 2018, he also had his first top-10 finishes on the main Japan Golf Tour since 2014, including a tie for fourth place in the Fujisankei Classic.

In early 2020, Kinoshita finished tied for 6th place in the SMBC Singapore Open. The event was one of the Open Qualifying Series for the Open Championship and his high finish gave him entry to the 2020 Open Championship. The 2020 Open was later cancelled but Kinoshita was given an entry into the 2021 Open Championship, his first major championship. In late 2020, Kinoshita was runner-up in the Mitsui Sumitomo Visa Taiheiyo Masters, a stroke behind Jinichiro Kozuma, who had an eagle at the final hole while Kinoshita could only make a par.

Kinoshita had his first win on the Japan Golf Tour at the Japan Golf Tour Championship Mori Building Cup Shishido Hills, winning by 5 strokes from Yuki Furuwaka. Three weeks later, he won again on the tour, at the Dunlop Srixon Fukushima Open. He had a final round 62, to get into a playoff with Ryuko Tokimatsu, and won with a birdie at the first extra hole.

At the 2021 Open Championship, Kinoshita placed 59th. This was after making a par putt on the 18th on Friday's second round to make the cut line.

== Professional wins (4) ==
=== Japan Golf Tour wins (3) ===
Legend
Japan majors (1)
Other Japan Golf Tour (2)

No.	Date	Tournament	Winning score	Margin of victory	Runner-up
1	6 Jun 2021	Japan Golf Tour Championship; Mori Building Cup Shishido Hills	−14 (67-68-67-68=270)	5 strokes	(Japan) Yuki Furuwaka
2	27 Jun 2021	Dunlop Srixon Fukushima Open	−25 (70-66-65-62=263)	Playoff	(Japan) Ryuko Tokimatsu
3	26 May 2024	Gateway to The Open Mizuno Open	−12 (69-66-70-71=276)	2 strokes	(South Korea) Koh Gun-taek

Japan Golf Tour playoff record (1–0)

No.	Year	Tournament	Opponent	Result
1	2021	Dunlop Srixon Fukushima Open	(Japan) Ryuko Tokimatsu	Won with birdie on first extra hole

=== Japan Challenge Tour wins (1) ===
No.	Date	Tournament	Winning score	Margin of victory	Runners-up
1	8 Jun 2018	ISPS Handa Challenge Cup	−14 (67-63-72=202)	2 strokes	(Japan) Fumihiro Ebine, (Japan) Daisuke Matsubara

== Results in major championships ==
Tournament	2021	2022	2023	2024
Masters Tournament				
PGA Championship		CUT		
U.S. Open				
The Open Championship	T59			CUT

Did not play

CUT = missed the half-way cut
"T" = tied

== Results in World Golf Championships ==
Tournament	2021
Championship	
Match Play	
Invitational	T43
Champions	NT^{1}

^{1}Cancelled due to COVID-19 pandemic

Did not play

"T" = Tied
NT = No tournament
