= Naoyuki Kataoka =

Japanese professional golfer (born 1997)

Personal information
- Nationality: Japan
- Born: 28 December 1997 (age 28) Hokkaido Prefecture, Japan
- Height: 171 cm (5 ft 7 in)
- Weight: 68 kg (150 lb)

Career
- Sport: Golf
- College: Tohoku Fukushi University
- Turned professional: 2019
- Current tour: Japan Golf Tour

Best results in major championships
- Masters Tournament: CUT: 2026
- PGA Championship: DNP
- U.S. Open: DNP
- The Open Championship: T59: 2026

Naoyuki Kataoka (born 28 December 1997) is a Japanese professional golfer. He won the 2025 Japan Open Golf Championship and gained entry into his first major championship, the 2026 Masters Tournament.

== Amateur wins ==
- 2014 Hokkaido Amateur
- 2016 Hokkaido Amateur
- 2018 Hokkaido Amateur

== Professional wins (2) ==
=== Japan Golf Tour wins (2) ===
Legend
Japan majors (1)
Other Japan Golf Tour (1)

No.	Date	Tournament	Winning score	Margin of victory	Runner(s)-up
1	9 May 2021	Japan Players Championship	−15 (69-68-68-68=273)	1 stroke	(United States) Todd Baek, (Japan) Katsumasa Miyamoto, (Japan) Eric Sugimoto, (Japan) Genzo Tokimatsu, (Japan) Yuta Uetake
2	19 Oct 2025	Japan Open Golf Championship	−3 (70-70-69-68=277)	Playoff	(Japan) Satoshi Hara

Japan Golf Tour playoff record (1–1)

No.	Year	Tournament	Opponent(s)	Result
1	2025	Japan Open Golf Championship	(Japan) Satoshi Hara	Won with par on first extra hole
2	2026	BMW Japan Golf Tour Championship Mori Building Cup	(Japan) Hiroshi Iwata, (Hong Kong) Kho Taichi	Iwata won with birdie on first extra hole

== Results in major championships ==
Tournament	2026
Masters Tournament	CUT
PGA Championship	
U.S. Open	
The Open Championship	T59

Did not play

CUT = missed the half-way cut
"T" = tied

== Team appearances ==
Amateur

- Nomura Cup (representing Japan): 2015 (winners)
