= Yuki Inamori =

Japanese professional golfer (born 1994)

Personal information
- Nationality: Japan
- Born: 2 October 1994 (age 32) Kagoshima Prefecture, Japan
- Height: 1.69 m (5 ft 7 in)
- Weight: 68 kg (150 lb)

Career
- Sport: Golf
- Turned professional: 2011
- Current tour: Japan Golf Tour
- Former tour: Japan Challenge Tour
- Professional wins: 6
- Highest ranking: 73 (26 June 2022) (as of 25 October 2026)

Number of wins by tour
- Japan Golf Tour: 5
- Other: 1

Best results in major championships
- Masters Tournament: DNP
- PGA Championship: CUT: 2022
- U.S. Open: DNP
- The Open Championship: T72: 2019

Yuki Inamori (稲森 佑貴, Inamori Yūki; born 2 October 1994) is a Japanese professional golfer.

Inamori played on the Japan Challenge Tour from 2012 to 2014, winning the 2014 Seven Dreamers Challenge. He has played on the Japan Golf Tour since 2014, winning the 2018 and 2020 Japan Opens.

== Professional wins (6) ==
=== Japan Golf Tour wins (5) ===
Legend
Flagship events (2)
Japan majors (2) (Note: The 2018 and 2020 Japan Open Golf Championships were also Japan major championships.)
Other Japan Golf Tour (3)

No.	Date	Tournament	Winning score	Margin of victory	Runner-up
1	14 Oct 2018	Japan Open Golf Championship	−14 (68-67-67-68=270)	2 strokes	(South Africa) Shaun Norris
2	19 Oct 2020	Japan Open Golf Championship (2)	−5 (70-68-68-69=275)	1 stroke	(Japan) Hideto Tanihara
3	1 May 2022	The Crowns	−16 (64-71-66-63=264)	3 strokes	(South Korea) Hwang Jung-gon
4	26 Jun 2022	Japan Players Championship	−23 (68-66-66-65=265)	1 stroke	(Japan) Kaito Onishi
5	8 Oct 2023	ACN Championship	−17 (68-67-70-66=271)	Playoff	(South Korea) Song Young-han

Japan Golf Tour playoff record (1–1)

No.	Year	Tournament	Opponent	Result
1	2023	ACN Championship	(South Korea) Song Young-han	Won with par on first extra hole
2	2026	Token Homemate Cup	(Japan) Tomohiro Ishizaka	Lost to par on second extra hole

=== Japan Challenge Tour wins (1) ===
No.	Date	Tournament	Winning score	Margin of victory	Runner-up
1	19 Sep 2014	Seven Dreamers Challenge	−12 (66-66=132)	Playoff	(Japan) Shotaro Wada

== Results in major championships ==
Results not in chronological order in 2020.

Tournament	2019	2020	2021	2022
Masters Tournament				
PGA Championship				CUT
U.S. Open				
The Open Championship	T72	NT	CUT	

Did not play

"T" indicates a tie for a place
NT = No tournament due to COVID-19 pandemic

== Results in World Golf Championships ==
Tournament	2018	2019	2020	2021
Championship				T48
Match Play			NT^{1}	
Invitational				
Champions	T73		NT^{1}	NT^{1}

^{1}Cancelled due to COVID-19 pandemic

Did not play

NT = No tournament
"T" = Tied
