= Ryuko Tokimatsu =

Japanese professional golfer

Personal information
- Nationality: Japan
- Born: 7 September 1993 (age 33) Fukuoka Prefecture, Japan
- Height: 1.68 m (5 ft 6 in)
- Weight: 75 kg (165 lb; 11.8 st)

Career
- Sport: Golf
- Turned professional: 2012
- Current tour: Japan Golf Tour
- Former tour: Japan Challenge Tour
- Professional wins: 4
- Highest ranking: 97 (24 June 2018)

Number of wins by tour
- Japan Golf Tour: 3
- Other: 1

Best results in major championships
- Masters Tournament: DNP
- PGA Championship: CUT: 2018
- U.S. Open: DNP
- The Open Championship: CUT: 2018

Ryuko Tokimatsu (時松 隆光, Tokimatsu Ryūkō; born 7 September 1993) is a Japanese professional golfer.

Tokimatsu plays on the Japan Golf Tour and the Japan Challenge Tour. He had one win on each tour in 2016.

Tokimatsu made his debut on American soil at the 2018 WGC-Bridgestone Invitational, having qualified by virtue of his win at the 2017 Bridgestone Open.

== Professional wins (4) ==
=== Japan Golf Tour wins (3) ===
No.	Date	Tournament	Winning score	Margin of victory	Runner(s)-up
1	24 Jul 2016	Dunlop Srixon Fukushima Open	−25 (65-67-63-68=263)	3 strokes	(Japan) Takashi Iwamoto
2	22 Oct 2017	Bridgestone Open	−9 (69-64=133) (Note: Shortened to 36 holes due to weather.)	2 strokes	(South Korea) Lee Sang-hee
3	20 May 2018	Kansai Open Golf Championship	−10 (68-68-71-71=278)	1 stroke	(Japan) Kunihiro Kamii, (Japan) Shugo Imahira

Japan Golf Tour playoff record (0–3)

No.	Year	Tournament	Opponent(s)	Result
1	2017	ANA Open	(Japan) Yuta Ikeda, (Japan) Shugo Imahira	Ikeda won with birdie on first extra hole
2	2019	ANA Open	(Japan) Yosuke Asaji, (Japan) Terumichi Kakazu, (United States) Seungsu Han, (South Africa) Shaun Norris	Asaji won with birdie on first extra hole
3	2021	Dunlop Srixon Fukushima Open	(Japan) Ryosuke Kinoshita	Lost to birdie on first extra hole

=== Japan Challenge Tour wins (1) ===
No.	Date	Tournament	Winning score	Margin of victory	Runners-up
1	1 Jul 2016	Japan Create Challenge	−9 (65-70=135)	Playoff	(Japan) Yuto Soeda, (South Korea) Kwon Sung-yeol

== Results in major championships ==
Tournament	2018
Masters Tournament	
U.S. Open	
The Open Championship	CUT
PGA Championship	CUT

Did not play

CUT = missed the half-way cut

== Results in World Golf Championships ==
Tournament	2018
Championship	
Match Play	
Invitational	T39
Champions	

Did not play

"T" = tied

== Team appearances ==
Professional

- Amata Friendship Cup (representing Japan): 2018
