= 2020–21 Japan Golf Tour =

Golf tour season

2020–21 Japan Golf Tour season
- Duration: 16 January 2020 – 5 December 2021
- Number of official events: 30 (Note: A further 20 tournaments were scheduled but were either cancelled or removed from the schedule.)
- Most wins: (Japan) Rikuya Hoshino (3) (United States) Chan Kim (3)
- Money list: (United States) Chan Kim
- Most Valuable Player: (United States) Chan Kim
- Rookie of the Year: (Japan) Takumi Kanaya

The 2020–21 Japan Golf Tour was the 48th season of the Japan Golf Tour (formerly the PGA of Japan Tour), the main professional golf tour in Japan since it was formed in 1973.

== In-season changes ==
The 2020 season was originally scheduled to be played from 16 January to 6 December 2020, consisting of 25 official events. However, most of the scheduled tournaments were cancelled during 2020 due to COVID-19 pandemic. On 25 December 2020, the tour announced the schedule for 2021 and confirmed that it would be merged with the 2020 schedule to form the 2020–21 season.

== Schedule ==
The following table lists official events during the 2020–21 season.

Date	Tournament	Location	Purse (¥)	Winner (Note: The number in brackets after each winner's name is the number of Japan Golf Tour events they had won up to and including that tournament. This information is only shown for Japan Golf Tour members.)	OWGR points	Other tours (Note: ASA − Asian Tour; KOR − Korean Tour; PGAT − PGA Tour.)	Notes
19 Jan 2020	SMBC Singapore Open	Singapore	US$1,000,000	(United States) Matt Kuchar (n/a)	26	ASA	
~~19 Apr 2020~~	Token Homemate Cup	Mie	–	Cancelled	–		
~~3 May 2020~~	The Crowns	Aichi	–	Cancelled	–		
~~10 May 2020~~	Asia-Pacific Diamond Cup Golf	Chiba	–	Cancelled	–	ASA	
~~24 May 2020~~	Kansai Open Golf Championship	Hyōgo	–	Cancelled	–		
~~31 May 2020~~	Gateway to The Open Mizuno Open	Ibaraki	–	Cancelled	–		
~~7 Jun 2020~~	Japan Golf Tour Championship; Mori Building Cup Shishido Hills	Ibaraki	–	Cancelled	–		Japan major
~~28 Jun 2020~~	Dunlop Srixon Fukushima Open	Fukushima	–	Cancelled	–		
~~5 Jul 2020~~	Japan PGA Championship	Tochigi	–	Cancelled	–		Japan major
~~12 Jul 2020~~	Golf Partner Pro-Am Tournament	Ibaraki	–	Cancelled	–		New Pro-Am tournament
~~23 Aug 2020~~	Shigeo Nagashima Invitational Sega Sammy Cup	Hokkaido	–	Cancelled	–		
~~30 Aug 2020~~	RIZAP KBC Augusta	Fukuoka	–	Cancelled	–		
6 Sep 2020	Fujisankei Classic	Yamanashi	110,000,000	(Japan) Rikuya Hoshino (3)	16		
~~13 Sep 2020~~	Shinhan Donghae Open	South Korea	–	Removed (Note: Event proceeded as a sole-sanctioned Korean Tour event.)	–	~~ASA, KOR~~	
~~20 Sep 2020~~	ANA Open	Hokkaido	–	Cancelled	–		
~~27 Sep 2020~~	Panasonic Open Golf Championship	Kyoto	–	Cancelled	–	ASA	
~~4 Oct 2020~~	Vantelin Tokai Classic	Aichi	–	Cancelled	–		
~~11 Oct 2020~~	Bridgestone Open	Chiba	–	Cancelled	–		
18 Oct 2020	Japan Open Golf Championship	Chiba	157,500,000	(Japan) Yuki Inamori (2)	32		Flagship event (Note: Also a Japan major championship.)
~~1 Nov 2020~~	The Top	TBD	–	Cancelled	–		New tournament
~~8 Nov 2020~~	Mynavi ABC Championship	Hyōgo	–	Cancelled	–		
15 Nov 2020	Mitsui Sumitomo Visa Taiheiyo Masters	Shizuoka	120,000,000	(Japan) Jinichiro Kozuma (1)	16		
22 Nov 2020	Dunlop Phoenix Tournament	Miyazaki	100,000,000	(Japan) Takumi Kanaya (2)	16		
~~29 Nov 2020~~	Casio World Open	Kōchi	–	Cancelled	–		
6 Dec 2020	Golf Nippon Series JT Cup	Tokyo	100,000,000	(United States) Chan Kim (5)	16		Japan major
18 Apr 2021	Token Homemate Cup	Mie	130,000,000	(Japan) Takumi Kanaya (3)	16		
25 Apr 2021	Kansai Open Golf Championship	Hyōgo	60,000,000	(Japan) Rikuya Hoshino (4)	16		
2 May 2021	The Crowns	Aichi	100,000,000	(Japan) Hiroshi Iwata (3)	16		
9 May 2021	Japan Players Championship	Tochigi	50,000,000	(Japan) Naoyuki Kataoka (1)	16		New tournament
16 May 2021	Asia-Pacific Diamond Cup Golf	Kanagawa	100,000,000	(Japan) Rikuya Hoshino (5)	16		
23 May 2021	Golf Partner Pro-Am Tournament	Ibaraki	50,000,000	(South Africa) Shaun Norris (5)	16		New Pro-Am tournament (Note: Tournament's debut delayed from 2020.)
30 May 2021	Gateway to The Open Mizuno Open	Okayama	80,000,000	(Philippines) Juvic Pagunsan (1)	16		
6 Jun 2021	Japan Golf Tour Championship; Mori Building Cup Shishido Hills	Ibaraki	150,000,000	(Japan) Ryosuke Kinoshita (1)	16		Japan major
27 Jun 2021	Dunlop Srixon Fukushima Open	Fukushima	50,000,000	(Japan) Ryosuke Kinoshita (2)	16		
4 Jul 2021	Japan PGA Championship	Tochigi	100,000,000	(South Korea) Kim Seong-hyeon (1)	16		Japan major
22 Aug 2021	Shigeo Nagashima Invitational Sega Sammy Cup	Hokkaido	120,000,000	(Japan) Kazuki Higa (2)	16		
29 Aug 2021	Sansan KBC Augusta	Fukuoka	100,000,000	(Zimbabwe) Scott Vincent (1)	16		
5 Sep 2021	Fujisankei Classic	Yamanashi	110,000,000	(Japan) Shugo Imahira (5)	16		
~~12 Sep 2021~~	Shinhan Donghae Open	South Korea	–	Removed	–	~~KOR~~	
19 Sep 2021	ANA Open	Hokkaido	100,000,000	(Zimbabwe) Scott Vincent (2)	16		
26 Sep 2021	Panasonic Open	Kyoto	100,000,000	(Japan) Keita Nakajima (a) (1)	16		
3 Oct 2021	Vantelin Tokai Classic	Aichi	110,000,000	(United States) Chan Kim (6)	16		
10 Oct 2021	Bridgestone Open	Chiba	110,000,000	(Japan) Tomoyasu Sugiyama (1)	16		
17 Oct 2021	Japan Open Golf Championship	Shiga	210,000,000	(South Africa) Shaun Norris (6)	32		Flagship event
31 Oct 2021; ~~25 Jul 2021~~	ISPS Handa Gatsu-n to tobase Tour tournament	Ibaraki	83,000,000	(Japan) Tomoyo Ikemura (1)	16		New tournament
7 Nov 2021	Mynavi ABC Championship	Hyōgo	150,000,000	(Japan) Yosuke Asaji (3)	16		
14 Nov 2021	Mitsui Sumitomo Visa Taiheiyo Masters	Shizuoka	150,000,000	(Japan) Hideto Tanihara (15)	16		
21 Nov 2021	Dunlop Phoenix Tournament	Miyazaki	150,000,000	(United States) Chan Kim (7)	16		
28 Nov 2021	Casio World Open	Kōchi	150,000,000	(Japan) Mikumu Horikawa (2)	16		
5 Dec 2021	Golf Nippon Series JT Cup	Tokyo	130,000,000	(Japan) Hideto Tanihara (16)	16		Japan major

=== Unofficial events ===
The following events were sanctioned by the Japan Golf Tour, but did not carry official money, nor were wins official.

Date	Tournament	Location	Purse (¥)	Winner(s)	OWGR points	Other tours	Notes
~~19 Jul 2020~~	The Open Championship	England	–	Cancelled	–		Major championship
9 Aug 2020; ~~17 May 2020~~	PGA Championship	United States	US$11,000,000	(United States) Collin Morikawa	100		Major championship
20 Sep 2020; ~~21 Jun 2020~~	U.S. Open	United States	US$12,500,000	(United States) Bryson DeChambeau	100		Major championship
25 Oct 2020	Zozo Championship	United States (Note: Moved from Chiba due to the COVID-19 pandemic.)	US$8,000,000	(United States) Patrick Cantlay	70	PGAT	Limited-field event
15 Nov 2020; ~~12 Apr 2020~~	Masters Tournament	United States	US$11,500,000	(United States) Dustin Johnson	100		Major championship
11 Apr 2021	Masters Tournament	United States	US$11,500,000	(Japan) Hideki Matsuyama	100		Major championship
23 May 2021	PGA Championship	United States	US$12,000,000	(United States) Phil Mickelson	100		Major championship
20 Jun 2021	U.S. Open	United States	US$12,500,000	(Spain) Jon Rahm	100		Major championship
18 Jul 2021	The Open Championship	England	US$11,500,000	(United States) Collin Morikawa	100		Major championship
24 Oct 2021	Zozo Championship	Chiba	US$9,950,000	(Japan) Hideki Matsuyama	40	PGAT	Limited-field event
12 Dec 2021	Hitachi 3Tours Championship	Chiba	57,000,000	LPGA of Japan Tour	n/a		Team event

== Money list ==
The money list was based on prize money won during the season, calculated in Japanese yen.

Position	Player	Prize money (¥)
1	(United States) Chan Kim	127,599,803
2	(Japan) Takumi Kanaya	119,803,605
3	(Japan) Ryosuke Kinoshita	115,001,239
4	(Japan) Hideto Tanihara	111,599,542
5	(Japan) Rikuya Hoshino	107,341,089

== Awards ==
Award	Winner	Ref.
Most Valuable Player	(United States) Chan Kim	
Rookie of the Year (Shimada Trophy)	(Japan) Takumi Kanaya	

== Japan Challenge Tour ==
2020–21 Japan Challenge Tour season
- Duration: 16 September 2020 – 22 October 2021
- Number of official events: 16 (Note: A further 10 tournaments were scheduled but were canceled.)
- Most wins: (Japan) Ryo Hisatsune (3)
- Money list: (Japan) Ryo Hisatsune

The 2020–21 Japan Challenge Tour, titled as the 2020–21 AbemaTV Tour for sponsorship reasons, was the 36th season of the Japan Challenge Tour, the official development tour to the Japan Golf Tour.

=== Schedule ===
The following table lists official events during the 2020–21 season.

Date	Tournament	Location	Purse (¥)	Winner (Note: The number in brackets after each winner's name is the number of Japan Challenge Tour events they had won up to and including that tournament. It is rare for someone to accumulate many wins on the Japan Challenge Tour as success at this level usually leads to promotion to the Japan Golf Tour.)	OWGR points
~~5 Apr 2020~~	Novil Cup	Tokushima	–	Cancelled	–
~~17 Apr 2020~~	i Golf Shaper Challenge	Fukuoka	–	Cancelled	–
~~24 Apr 2020~~	Japan Create Challenge	Fukuoka	–	Cancelled	–
~~15 May 2020~~	PGM Challenge I	Hyōgo	–	Cancelled	–
~~29 May 2020~~	Taiheiyo Club Challenge Tournament	Saitama	–	Cancelled	–
~~12 Jun 2020~~	Landic Challenge 8	Fukuoka	–	Cancelled	–
~~19 Jun 2020~~	Minami Akita CC Michinoku Challenge	Akita	–	Cancelled	–
~~27 Jun 2020~~	Daisendori Cup	Tottori	–	Cancelled	–
~~4 Sep 2020~~	Elite Grips Challenge	Hyōgo	–	Cancelled	–
18 Sep 2020	PGM Challenge II	Chiba	15,000,000	(Japan) Daichi Sato (1)	4
2 Oct 2020	TI Challenge	Gunma	15,000,000	(Japan) Keisuke Otawa (1)	4
9 Oct 2020	Ryo Ishikawa Everyone Project Challenge	Tochigi	15,000,000	(Japan) Ren Takeuchi (1)	4
23 Oct 2020	Delight Works Challenge	Ibaraki	15,000,000	(Japan) Hideto Kobukuro (1)	4
16 Apr 2021	i Golf Shaper Challenge	Fukuoka	15,000,000	(Japan) Ayumi Kawamitsu (1)	4
28 May 2021	Taiheiyo Club Challenge Tournament	Saitama	15,000,000	(Japan) Shingo Ito (1)	4
11 Jun 2021	Landic Challenge 8	Fukuoka	15,000,000	(Japan) Daisuke Yasumoto (1)	4
18 Jun 2021	Japan Create Challenge	Fukuoka	15,000,000	(Japan) Ryo Hisatsune (1)	4
26 Jun 2021	Daisendori Cup	Tottori	18,000,000	(Japan) Akihiro Narutomi (1)	4
9 Jul 2021	Japan Players Championship Challenge	Iwate	15,000,000	(Japan) Tomoyasu Sugiyama (1)	4
30 Jul 2021	Minami Akita CC Michinoku Challenge	Akita	15,000,000	(Japan) Ryo Hisatsune (2)	4
~~3 Sep 2021~~	Elite Grips Challenge	Hyōgo	–	Cancelled	–
17 Sep 2021	PGM Challenge	Ibaraki	15,000,000	(Japan) Konosuke Nakazato (4)	4
24 Sep 2021	ISPS Handa Hero ni nare! Challenge Tournament	Tochigi	23,000,000	(Japan) Ryo Hisatsune (3)	4
1 Oct 2021	TI Challenge	Gunma	15,000,000	(Japan) Riki Kawamoto (a) (1)	4
8 Oct 2021	Ryo Ishikawa Everyone Project Challenge	Tochigi	15,000,000	(Japan) Yuto Katsuragawa (1)	4
22 Oct 2021	Delight Works JGTO Final	Ibaraki	20,000,000	(Japan) Junya Kameshiro (1)	4

=== Money list ===
The money list was based on prize money won during the season, calculated in Japanese yen. The top 20 players on the money list earned status to play on the 2022 Japan Golf Tour.

Position	Player	Prize money (¥)
1	(Japan) Ryo Hisatsune	10,922,467
2	(Japan) Daichi Sato	6,132,326
3	(Japan) Yuto Katsuragawa	5,938,614
4	(Japan) Taichi Nabetani	5,547,031
5	(Japan) Junya Kameshiro	5,404,507
