= Seungsu Han =

American professional golfer

Personal information
- Full name: Han Seung-su
- Nationality: United States
- Born: September 10, 1986 (age 40) Incheon, South Korea
- Height: 1.75 m (5 ft 9 in)
- Weight: 70 kg (154 lb)

Career
- Sport: Golf
- College: University of Nevada-Las Vegas
- Turned professional: 2009
- Current tour: Korean Tour
- Former tours: Japan Golf Tour; Asian Tour; Nationwide Tour; Canadian Tour
- Professional wins: 4
- Highest ranking: 78 (January 7, 2018) (as of October 25, 2026)

Number of wins by tour
- Japan Golf Tour: 1
- Asian Tour: 1
- Other: 2

Best results in major championships
- Masters Tournament: DNP
- PGA Championship: T50: 2018
- U.S. Open: DNP
- The Open Championship: CUT: 2023

Han Seung-su (born September 10, 1986), commonly known as Seungsu Han, is a Korean-American professional golfer who plays on the Asian Tour and the Korean Tour. He has also played on the Japan Golf Tour, winning the 2017 Casio World Open. He also won the 2023 Kolon Korea Open.

== Early life and amateur career ==
Han was born in South Korea. He attended IMG Academy and was the first and only player to win all 5 AJGA Majors in one year during 2002. He also attended the University of Nevada-Las Vegas.

== Professional career ==
Han turned professional after earning a place on the 2009 Nationwide Tour. He had an unsuccessful first season on the Nationwide Tour, making the cut in only 6 out of 24 events he played and failing to retain his place on the tour. He played on the Asian Tour in 2010, again with little success. He played a few events on the Canadian Tour in 2012 and on the Japan Golf Tour in 2014.

Han played on the Japan Golf Tour again in 2016 with more success and has played regularly on the tour since then. His best season on the tour was 2017 when he won the Casio World Open, was runner-up twice and third a further three times. He finished the season 5th in the money list. He was also a runner-up in the Genesis Championship on the 2017 Korean Tour. His good performances in 2017 lifted him into the top 100 of the world rankings in late 2017 and for the first half of 2018, earning him an invitation to the 2018 PGA Championship, his first major championship. After a first round 74 he had a 66 to just make the cut and after further rounds of 66 and 72 he finished in a tie for 50th place.

== Amateur wins ==
- 2006 Porter Cup

== Professional wins (4) ==
=== Japan Golf Tour wins (1) ===
No.	Date	Tournament	Winning score	Margin of victory	Runners-up
1	Nov 26, 2017	Casio World Open	−13 (71-73-65-66=275)	1 stroke	(Japan) Ryo Ishikawa, (Australia) Brendan Jones, (South Korea) Kim Kyung-tae, (Japan) Ryuko Tokimatsu

Japan Golf Tour playoff record (0–2)

No.	Year	Tournament	Opponents	Result
1	2017	Fujisankei Classic	(Japan) Satoshi Kodaira, (South Korea) Ryu Hyun-woo	Ryu won with par on first extra hole
2	2019	ANA Open	(Japan) Yosuke Asaji, (Japan) Terumichi Kakazu, (South Africa) Shaun Norris, (Japan) Ryuko Tokimatsu	Asaji won with birdie on first extra hole

=== Asian Tour wins (1) ===
No.	Date	Tournament	Winning score	Margin of victory	Runner-up
1	Jun 25, 2023	Kolon Korea Open^{1}	−6 (66-69-72-71=278)	6 strokes	(South Korea) Kang Kyung-nam

^{1}Co-sanctioned by the Korean Tour

=== Korean Tour wins (3) ===
No.	Date	Tournament	Winning score	Margin of victory	Runner-up
1	Nov 8, 2020	LG Signature Players Championship	−17 (66-69-70-66=271)	1 stroke	(South Korea) Park Sang-hyun
2	Jun 25, 2023	Kolon Korea Open^{1}	−6 (66-69-72-71=278)	6 strokes	(South Korea) Kang Kyung-nam
3	May 26, 2024	KB Financial Liiv Championship	−11 (72-67-67-71=277)	1 stroke	(South Korea) Kim Yeun-sub

^{1}Co-sanctioned by the Asian Tour

Korean Tour playoff record (0–1)

No.	Year	Tournament	Opponent	Result
1	2022	LG Signature Players Championship	(South Korea) Kim Yeong-su	Lost to birdie on third extra hole

== Results in major championships ==
Results not in chronological order before 2019.

Tournament	2018	2019	2020	2021	2022	2023
PGA Championship	T50					
The Open Championship			NT			CUT

"T" = Tied
NT = No tournament due to the COVID-19 pandemic
Note: Han only played in the PGA Championship and The Open Championship.
