= 2026 Japan Golf Tour =

Golf tour season

2026 Japan Golf Tour season
- Duration: 5 March 2026 – 6 December 2026
- Number of official events: 23

The 2026 Japan Golf Tour is the 53rd season of the Japan Golf Tour (formerly the PGA of Japan Tour), the main professional golf tour in Japan since it was formed in 1973.

== Changes for 2026 ==
The season marked a switch of format from the traditional money list to a points list.

== Schedule ==
The following table lists official events during the 2026 season.

Date	Tournament	Location	Purse (¥)	Winner (Note: The number in brackets after each winner's name is the number of Japan Golf Tour events they had won up to and including that tournament. This information is only shown for Japan Golf Tour members.)	OWGR points	Other tours (Note: ANZ − PGA Tour of Australasia; KOR − Korean Tour.)	Notes
8 Mar	ISPS Handa Japan-Australasia Championship	New Zealand	A$1,200,000	(Australia) Travis Smyth (n/a)	9.50	ANZ	New tournament
12 Apr	Token Homemate Cup	Mie	130,000,000	(Japan) Tomohiro Ishizaka (1)	5.81		
26 Apr	Maezawa Cup	Chiba	200,000,000	(Japan) Ren Yonezawa (3)	5.52		
3 May	The Crowns	Aichi	110,000,000	(Japan) Mikumu Horikawa (5)	6.68		
17 May	Kansai Open Golf Championship	Osaka	80,000,000	(Japan) Yoshinori Fujimoto (3)	8.13		
24 May	Japan PGA Championship Senko Group Cup	Shiga	150,000,000	(Japan) Yusaku Hosono (1)	7.88		Japan major
31 May	Gateway to The Open Mizuno Open	Okayama	100,000,000	(South Africa) Shaun Norris (9)	7.99		
7 Jun	Japan Golf Tour Championship Mori Building Cup	Ibaraki	150,000,000	(Japan) Hiroshi Iwata (8)	8.02		Japan major
5 Jul	Japan Players Championship	Tochigi	50,000,000	(Japan) Aguri Iwasaki (3)	8.87		
23 Aug	Jumbo Ozaki Memorial Tournament	Gunma	100,000,000	(Japan) Sejung Hiramoto (1)	8.17		New tournament
30 Aug	Sansan KBC Augusta	Fukuoka	100,000,000	(South Korea) Lee Sang-hee (1)	8.59		
13 Sep	Shinhan Donghae Open	South Korea	₩1,500,000,000	(Japan) Kosuke Sunagawa (1)	9.20	KOR	
20 Sep	ANA Open	Hokkaidō	100,000,000	(Japan) Hirotaro Naito (1)	7.23		
27 Sep	Richard Mille Charity Tournament	Ishikawa	100,000,000	(Japan) Kaito Onishi (2)	7.48		
4 Oct	Drugstore Cosmos Cup	Shizuoka	150,000,000	(Japan) Hiroshi Iwata (9)	7.15		New tournament
18 Oct	Japan Open Golf Championship	Shiga	210,000,000	(Japan) Yusaku Hosono (2)	7.14		Japan major
25 Oct	Fortinet Players Cup	Chiba	150,000,000	(Japan) Yoshinori Fujimoto (4)	5.70		
1 Nov	Vantelin Tokai Classic	Aichi	110,000,000	(Japan) Yuto Katsuragawa (3)	6.77		
8 Nov	ACN Championship	Hyōgo	120,000,000	(Japan) Yuta Ikeda (22)	6.84		
15 Nov	Mitsui Sumitomo Visa Taiheiyo Masters	Shizuoka	200,000,000	(Japan) Shugo Imahira (11)	4.54		
22 Nov	Dunlop Phoenix Tournament	Miyazaki	200,000,000	(United States) J. J. Spaun (n/a)	8.21		
29 Nov	Casio World Open	Kōchi	180,000,000				
6 Dec	Golf Nippon Series JT Cup	Tokyo	130,000,000				Japan major

=== Unofficial events ===
The following events were sanctioned by the Japan Golf Tour, but did not carry official money, nor were wins official.

Date	Tournament	Location	Purse (¥)	Winner(s)	OWGR points	Other tours	Notes
12 Apr	Masters Tournament	United States	US$22,500,000	(Northern Ireland) Rory McIlroy	100		Major championship
17 May	PGA Championship	United States	US$20,500,000	(England) Aaron Rai	100		Major championship
21 Jun	U.S. Open	United States	US$22,500,000	(United States) Wyndham Clark	100		Major championship
19 Jul	The Open Championship	England	US$17,750,000	(New Zealand) Ryan Fox	100		Major championship
11 Oct	Baycurrent Classic	Kanagawa	US$8,000,000	(United States) Michael Brennan	39.62	PGAT	Limited-field event
13 Dec	Hitachi 3Tours Championship	Chiba	57,000,000		n/a		Team event

== Japan Challenge Tour ==
2026 Japan Challenge Tour season
- Duration: 1 April 2026 – 30 October 2026
- Number of official events: 14
- Most wins: (United States) Shotaro Ban (2) (Japan) Taichi Kimura (2)
- Points list: (Japan) Taichi Kimura

The 2026 Japan Challenge Tour, titled as the 2026 ACN Tour, was the 41st season of the Japan Challenge Tour, the official development tour to the Japan Golf Tour.

=== Schedule ===
The following table lists official events during the 2026 season.

Date	Tournament	Location	Purse (¥)	Winner (Note: The number in brackets after each winner's name is the number of Japan Challenge Tour events they had won up to and including that tournament. It is rare for someone to accumulate many wins on the Japan Challenge Tour as success at this level usually leads to promotion to the Japan Golf Tour.)	OWGR points
3 Apr	Novil Cup	Tokushima	15,000,000	(Japan) Tomofumi Ouchi (1)	2.05
17 Apr	Newtus Cup	Ibaraki	15,000,000	(Japan) Taiga Sugihara (3)	2.61
9 May	Japan Players Championship Challenge	Fukui	15,000,000	(Japan) Tsubasa Ukita (1)	2.06
29 May	Taiheiyo Club Challenge Tournament	Saitama	15,000,000	(Japan) Taichi Kimura (2)	1.23
12 Jun	Landic Challenge 13	Fukuoka	18,000,000	(United States) Shotaro Ban (1)	1.98
19 Jun	i Golf Shaper Challenge	Fukuoka	18,000,000	(Japan) Kinjiro Kato (1)	2.12
26 Jun	Minami Akita CC Michinoku Challenge	Akita	15,000,000	(Japan) Shota Ueki (1)	1.96
10 Jul	Juchi Golf Challenge Tournament	Tochigi	15,000,000	(Japan) Tomohiro Umeyama (3)	2.04
29 Aug	Dunlop Phoenix Tournament Challenge	Fukushima	15,000,000	(Japan) Kazuma Manabe (1)	1.20
11 Sep	Kd2nd Challenge Cup	Ibaraki	20,000,000	(Japan) Noriyuki Kurogi (1)	1.20
2 Oct	Ryo Ishikawa Everyone Project Challenge	Fukushima	15,000,000	(Japan) Taichi Kimura (3)	1.15
9 Oct	Elite Grips Challenge	Hyōgo	15,000,000	(Japan) Daiki Hasegawa (1)	1.79
23 Oct	Japan Create Challenge	Fukuoka	20,000,000	(Japan) Michio Matsumura (3)	1.40
30 Oct	Delight Works JGTO Final	Ibaraki	20,000,000	(United States) Shotaro Ban (2)	2.05

=== Points list ===
The points list was based on tournament results during the season, calculated using a points-based system. The top 20 players on the points list earned status to play on the 2027 Japan Golf Tour.

Position	Player	Points
1	(Japan) Taichi Kimura	1,624
2	(United States) Shotaro Ban	1,587
3	(Japan) Tomofumi Ouchi	1,150
4	(Japan) Shota Ueki	870
5	(Japan) Taiga Sugihara	869
