= Hiroshi Iwata =

Japanese professional golfer

Hiroshi Iwata 岩田 寛
Personal information
- Nationality: Japan
- Born: 31 January 1981 (age 45) Sendai, Japan
- Height: 1.77 m (5 ft 10 in)
- Weight: 74 kg (163 lb; 11.7 st)

Career
- Sport: Golf
- College: Tohoku Fukushi University
- Turned professional: 2004
- Current tours: Japan Golf Tour; Asian Tour
- Former tour: PGA Tour
- Professional wins: 9
- Highest ranking: 63 (23 November 2014)

Number of wins by tour
- Japan Golf Tour: 9

Best results in major championships
- Masters Tournament: DNP
- PGA Championship: T21: 2015
- U.S. Open: DNP
- The Open Championship: CUT: 2008, 2014, 2015, 2023

Hiroshi Iwata (岩田 寛, Iwata Hiroshi; born 31 January 1981) is a Japanese professional golfer who plays on the Japan Golf Tour and the Asian Tour.

== Early life and amateur career ==
In 1981, Iwata was born in Sendai, Miyagi Prefecture, Japan. He started playing golf at the age of 14, by his father's influence, who ran a local golf range and was a professional golfer on the Japan Senior Tour. Iwata played college golf at Tohoku Fukushi University.

== Professional career ==
In 2004, Iwata turned professional and has played on the Japan Golf Tour since then. His first win came at the 2014 Fujisankei Classic. He also won the 2015 Shigeo Nagashima Invitational Sega Sammy Cup.

In the second round of the 2015 PGA Championship at Whistling Straits, Iwata shot a 63, which matched the then lowest round in a major championship. Iwata played on the 2016 PGA Tour, having qualified through the 2015 Web.com Tour Finals, finishing 24th in the priority ranking.

== Professional wins (9) ==
=== Japan Golf Tour wins (9) ===
Legend
Japan majors (2)
Other Japan Golf Tour (7)

No.	Date	Tournament	Winning score	Margin of victory	Runner(s)-up
1	7 Sep 2014	Fujisankei Classic	−10 (69-69-70-66=274)	1 stroke	(South Korea) Hur In-hoi
2	5 Jul 2015	Shigeo Nagashima Invitational Sega Sammy Cup	−16 (70-69-67-66=272)	1 stroke	(Japan) Shugo Imahira
3	2 May 2021	The Crowns	−12 (67-68-63=198) (Note: Shortened to 54 holes due to weather.)	3 strokes	(Japan) Katsumasa Miyamoto
4	21 Aug 2022	Shigeo Nagashima Invitational Sega Sammy Cup (2)	−19 (68-68-66-67=269)	2 strokes	(Japan) Tomoharu Otsuki
5	30 Apr 2023	The Crowns (2)	−15 (67-67-66-65=265)	3 strokes	(Japan) Rikuya Hoshino
6	9 Jun 2024	BMW Japan Golf Tour Championship Mori Building Cup	−13 (71-65-67-68=271)	Playoff	(Japan) Ryo Ishikawa
7	24 Nov 2024	Casio World Open	−14 (66-67-73-68=274)	1 stroke	(Japan) Taisei Shimizu
8	7 Jun 2026	BMW Japan Golf Tour Championship Mori Building Cup (2)	−8 (66-70-69-69=274)	Playoff	(Japan) Naoyuki Kataoka, (Hong Kong) Kho Taichi
9	4 Oct 2026	Drugstore Cosmos Cup	−13 (66-65-64-72=267)	1 stroke	(Japan) Yuto Katsumata

Japan Golf Tour playoff record (2–2)

No.	Year	Tournament	Opponent(s)	Result
1	2008	Fujisankei Classic	(Japan) Toyokazu Fujishima	Lost to par on first extra hole
2	2014	Dunlop Phoenix Tournament	(Japan) Hideki Matsuyama	Lost to par on first extra hole
3	2024	BMW Japan Golf Tour Championship Mori Building Cup	(Japan) Ryo Ishikawa	Won with par on first extra hole
4	2026	BMW Japan Golf Tour Championship Mori Building Cup	(Japan) Naoyuki Kataoka, (Hong Kong) Kho Taichi	Won with birdie on first extra hole

== Results in major championships ==
Tournament	2008	2009
Masters Tournament		
U.S. Open		
The Open Championship	CUT	
PGA Championship		

Tournament	2010	2011	2012	2013	2014	2015	2016	2017	2018
Masters Tournament									
U.S. Open									
The Open Championship					CUT	CUT			
PGA Championship						T21			

Tournament	2019	2020	2021	2022	2023
Masters Tournament					
PGA Championship					
U.S. Open					
The Open Championship		NT			CUT

Did not play

CUT = missed the half-way cut
"T" indicates a tie for a place
NT = No tournament due to the COVID-19 pandemic

== Results in World Golf Championships ==
Results not in chronological order before 2015.

Tournament	2014	2015
Championship		
Match Play		
Invitational		
Champions	T3	T64

Top 10
Did not play

"T" = tied

== See also ==
- 2015 Web.com Tour Finals graduates
