= Japan Challenge Tour =

Professional golf tour

- Current season, competition or edition: 2026 Japan Challenge Tour
- Formerly: AbemaTV Tour; Abema Tour
- Sport: Golf
- Founded: 1985
- First season: 1985
- Countries: Based in Japan
- Most titles: Tournament wins: (Japan) Gohei Sato (5) (Japan) Masamichi Uehira (5)
- Related competitions: Japan Golf Tour

The Japan Challenge Tour, currently titled as the ACN Tour, is a series of developmental golf tournaments run by the Japan Golf Tour Organization. It has been in operation since 1985.

In 2023, the schedule featured 12 tournaments, with prize funds of mostly ¥15,000,000. This is about a tenth of the level of prize money per event on offer on the main Japan Golf Tour, with the main tour also having a longer season.

== History ==
In January 2018, the tour signed a sponsor title agreement with AbemaTV, being renamed as the AbemaTV Tour for the 2018 season onwards. The agreement lasted until the end of the 2024 season. In March 2025, it was announced that ACN would become the new title sponsor of the tour, being renamed as the ACN Tour.

In July 2018, it was also announced that the tour would be included into the Official World Golf Ranking starting in 2019, with the winner receiving a minimum of 4 points for a 54-hole event.

The top 20 players earn entry into the Japan Golf Tour.

== Money and points list winners ==
Season	Points list	Points
2026	(Japan) Taichi Kimura	1,624
2025	(Japan) Ryota Wakahara	1,292
Season	Money list	Prize money (¥)
2024	(Japan) Taisei Yamada	5,259,789
2023	(Japan) Tatsunori Shogenji	11,253,106
2022	(Japan) Yujiro Ohori	7,798,551
2020–21	(Japan) Ryo Hisatsune	10,922,467
2019	(Japan) Yoshikazu Haku	6,797,444
2018	(Japan) Taihei Sato	7,256,163
2017	(Japan) Tomoharu Otsuki	3,787,591
2016	(Japan) Yoshinobu Tsukada	5,509,115
2015	(Japan) Yu Morimoto	4,479,531
2014	(Japan) Shugo Imahira	7,444,288
2013	(South Korea) Kwon Ki-taek	5,326,885
2012	(Japan) Yuki Koko	4,607,237
2011	(Japan) Tatsunori Nukaga	5,846,275
2010	(Fiji) Dinesh Chand	4,780,625
2009	(Australia) Chris Campbell	6,136,154
2008	(Japan) Masamichi Uehira	6,329,033
2007	(Japan) Michio Matsumura	6,685,183
2006	(Japan) Takaki Ono	7,710,069
2005	(Japan) Shoichi Ideguchi	5,070,263
2004	(Japan) Yoshiaki Kimura	4,199,650
2003	(Japan) Masamichi Uehira	3,082,833
2002	(Japan) Tatsuhiko Ichihara	4,124,935
2001	(South Korea) Hur Suk-ho	5,150,264
2000	(Japan) Masanori Kobayashi	3,851,250
1999	(Japan) Kosaku Makisaka	3,461,294
1998	No information known	
1997	No information known	
1996	No information known	
1995	No information known	
1994	No information known	
1993	No information known	
1992	No information known	
1991	No information known	
1990	No information known	
1989	No information known	
1988	No information known	
1987	No information known	
1986	No information known	
1985	No information known	
