= 2022 Japan Golf Tour =

Golf tour season

2022 Japan Golf Tour season
- Duration: 31 March 2022 – 4 December 2022
- Number of official events: 26
- Most wins: (Japan) Kazuki Higa (4)
- Money list: (Japan) Kazuki Higa
- Most Valuable Player: (Japan) Kazuki Higa
- Rookie of the Year: (Japan) Yuto Katsuragawa

The 2022 Japan Golf Tour was the 49th season of the Japan Golf Tour (formerly the PGA of Japan Tour), the main professional golf tour in Japan since it was formed in 1973.

== Response to LIV Golf ==
Following a statement produced by the Japan Golf Tour Organization on 1 October 2022, they outlined their position in regards to the ongoing dispute between LIV Golf and the PGA Tour and their alliance; the European Tour (DP World Tour). They stated that it would be beneficial to the Japan Golf Tour that they remained in a neutral position. However, they also came to the conclusion that they could potentially be better off siding with the PGA Tour, giving players in Asia a pathway to playing opportunities in the United States, as the Asian Tour has already struck an amicable relationship with LIV Golf, giving their players playing opportunities in the LIV Golf League via the International Series.

In December, a new agreement with the PGA Tour and European Tour was announced. As part of the deal, from 2023 onwards the top three on the Japan Golf Tour's season-ending money list earned status to play on the European Tour for the following season.

== Schedule ==
The following table lists official events during the 2022 season.

Date	Tournament	Location	Purse (¥)	Winner (Note: The number in brackets after each winner's name is the number of Japan Golf Tour events they had won up to and including that tournament. This information is only shown for Japan Golf Tour members.)	OWGR points	Other tours (Note: ASA − Asian Tour; EUR − European Tour; KOR − Korean Tour; PGAT − PGA Tour.)	Notes
3 Apr	Token Homemate Cup	Mie	130,000,000	(Japan) Jinichiro Kozuma (2)	16		
17 Apr	Kansai Open Golf Championship	Hyōgo	80,000,000	(Japan) Kazuki Higa (3)	16		
24 Apr	ISPS Handa Championship in Japan	Ibaraki	100,000,000	(Japan) Yuto Katsuragawa (1)	16	~~EUR~~	New tournament
1 May	The Crowns	Aichi	100,000,000	(Japan) Yuki Inamori (3)	16		
15 May	Asia Pacific Open Golf Championship Diamond Cup	Ibaraki	100,000,000	(Japan) Shugo Imahira (6)	15	ASA	
22 May	Golf Partner Pro-Am Tournament	Ibaraki	50,000,000	(Japan) Shugo Imahira (7)	16		Pro-Am
29 May	Gateway to The Open Mizuno Open	Okayama	80,000,000	(Zimbabwe) Scott Vincent (3)	16		
5 Jun	BMW Japan Golf Tour Championship Mori Building Cup	Ibaraki	150,000,000	(Japan) Kazuki Higa (4)	16		Japan major
12 Jun	ASO Iizuka Challenged Golf Tournament	Fukuoka	100,000,000	(Japan) Tomoyo Ikemura (2)	16		New tournament
26 Jun	Japan Players Championship	Tochigi	50,000,000	(Japan) Yuki Inamori (4)	16		
7 Aug	Japan PGA Championship	Shizuoka	150,000,000	(Japan) Mikumu Horikawa (3)	16		Japan major
21 Aug	Shigeo Nagashima Invitational Sega Sammy Cup	Hokkaidō	120,000,000	(Japan) Hiroshi Iwata (4)	7.62		
28 Aug	Sansan KBC Augusta	Fukuoka	100,000,000	(Japan) Riki Kawamoto (1)	8.08		
4 Sep	Fujisankei Classic	Yamanashi	110,000,000	(Japan) Kaito Onishi (1)	7.29		
11 Sep	Shinhan Donghae Open	Nara	₩1,400,000,000	(Japan) Kazuki Higa (5)	9.03	ASA, KOR	
18 Sep	ANA Open	Hokkaidō	100,000,000	(Japan) Tomoharu Otsuki (2)	7.08		
25 Sep	Panasonic Open Golf Championship	Hyōgo	100,000,000	(Japan) Taiga Semikawa (a) (1)	7.51		
2 Oct	Vantelin Tokai Classic	Aichi	110,000,000	(Japan) Riki Kawamoto (2)	7.36		
9 Oct	For The Players by The Players	Gunma	50,000,000	(Japan) Shintaro Kobayashi (1)	4.33		New tournament
23 Oct	Japan Open Golf Championship	Hyōgo	210,000,000	(Japan) Taiga Semikawa (a) (2)	8.57		Japan major
30 Oct	Heiwa PGM Championship	Ibaraki	150,000,000	(Japan) Rikuya Hoshino (6)	6.11		
6 Nov	Mynavi ABC Championship	Hyōgo	120,000,000	(Japan) Mikumu Horikawa (4)	6.12		
13 Nov	Mitsui Sumitomo Visa Taiheiyo Masters	Shizuoka	200,000,000	(Japan) Ryo Ishikawa (18)	6.15		
20 Nov	Dunlop Phoenix Tournament	Miyazaki	200,000,000	(Japan) Kazuki Higa (6)	9.54		
27 Nov	Casio World Open	Kōchi	200,000,000	(United States) Chan Kim (8)	6.73		
4 Dec	Golf Nippon Series JT Cup	Tokyo	130,000,000	(Japan) Hideto Tanihara (17)	4.84		Japan major

=== Unofficial events ===
The following events were sanctioned by the Japan Golf Tour, but did not carry official money, nor were wins official.

Date	Tournament	Location	Purse (¥)	Winner(s)	OWGR points	Other tours	Notes
23 Jan	SMBC Singapore Open	Singapore	US$1,250,000	(Thailand) Sadom Kaewkanjana	14	ASA	
10 Apr	Masters Tournament	United States	US$15,000,000	(United States) Scottie Scheffler	100		Major championship
22 May	PGA Championship	United States	US$15,000,000	(United States) Justin Thomas	100		Major championship
19 Jun	U.S. Open	United States	US$17,500,000	(England) Matt Fitzpatrick	100		Major championship
17 Jul	The Open Championship	Scotland	US$14,000,000	(Australia) Cameron Smith	100		Major championship
16 Oct	Zozo Championship	Chiba	US$11,000,000	(United States) Keegan Bradley	31.39	PGAT	
11 Dec	Hitachi 3Tours Championship	Chiba	57,000,000	Japan Golf Tour	n/a		Team event

== Money list ==
The money list was based on prize money won during the season, calculated in Japanese yen. The top three players on the money list earned status to play on the 2023 European Tour (DP World Tour).

Position	Player	Prize money (¥)	Status earned
1	(Japan) Kazuki Higa	181,598,825	Promoted to European Tour
2	(Japan) Rikuya Hoshino	114,404,050	Promoted to European Tour
3	(Japan) Aguri Iwasaki	96,670,570	Promoted to European Tour
4	(Japan) Mikumu Horikawa	95,594,744	
5	(Japan) Yuto Katsuragawa	87,970,697	

== Awards ==
Award	Winner	Ref.
Most Valuable Player	(Japan) Kazuki Higa	
Rookie of the Year (Shimada Trophy)	(Japan) Yuto Katsuragawa	

== Japan Challenge Tour ==
2022 Japan Challenge Tour season
- Duration: 6 April 2022 – 14 October 2022
- Number of official events: 14
- Most wins: (Japan) Takashi Ogiso (2) (Japan) Yujiro Ohori (2)
- Money list: (Japan) Yujiro Ohori

The 2022 Japan Challenge Tour, titled as the 2022 Abema Tour for sponsorship reasons, was the 37th season of the Japan Challenge Tour, the official development tour to the Japan Golf Tour.

=== Schedule ===
The following table lists official events during the 2022 season.

Date	Tournament	Location	Purse (¥)	Winner (Note: The number in brackets after each winner's name is the number of Japan Challenge Tour events they had won up to and including that tournament. It is rare for someone to accumulate many wins on the Japan Challenge Tour as success at this level usually leads to promotion to the Japan Golf Tour.)	OWGR points
8 Apr	Novil Cup	Tokushima	15,000,000	(Japan) Yuto Soeda (1)	4
22 Apr	i Golf Shaper Challenge	Fukuoka	15,000,000	(Japan) Hiroki Tanaka (1)	4
27 May	Taiheiyo Club Challenge Tournament	Saitama	15,000,000	(Japan) Taisei Yamada (1)	4
10 Jun	Landic Challenge 9	Fukuoka	15,000,000	(Japan) Taiko Nishiyama (1)	4
17 Jun	Japan Create Challenge	Fukuoka	15,000,000	(Japan) Taiga Semikawa (a) (1)	4
25 Jun	Daisendori Cup	Tottori	18,000,000	(Japan) Shota Matsumoto (1)	4
23 Jul	Japan Players Championship Challenge	Fukui	15,000,000	(Japan) Chisato Takamiya (a) (1)	4
29 Jul	Minami Akita CC Michinoku Challenge	Akita	15,000,000	(Japan) Takashi Ogiso (2)	4
3 Sep	Dunlop Phoenix Tournament Challenge	Fukushima	15,000,000	(Japan) Masayuki Yamashita (a) (1)	2.13
16 Sep	PGM Challenge	Niigata	15,000,000	(Japan) Yujiro Ohori (2)	1.92
23 Sep	ISPS Handa Hero ni nare! Challenge Tournament	Shizuoka	23,000,000	(Japan) Masanori Kobayashi (3)	1.98
30 Sep	Elite Grips Challenge	Hyōgo	15,000,000	(Japan) Takashi Ogiso (3)	2.14
7 Oct	Ryo Ishikawa Everyone Project Challenge	Tochigi	15,000,000	(Japan) Takuya Higa (1)	1.82
14 Oct	Delight Works JGTO Final	Ibaraki	20,000,000	(Japan) Yujiro Ohori (3)	2.57

=== Money list ===
The money list was based on prize money won during the season, calculated in Japanese yen. The top 20 players on the money list earned status to play on the 2023 Japan Golf Tour.

Position	Player	Prize money (¥)
1	(Japan) Yujiro Ohori	7,798,551
2	(Japan) Takashi Ogiso	7,603,935
3	(Japan) Terumichi Kakazu	6,315,737
4	(Japan) Taiko Nishiyama	4,879,779
5	(Japan) Shota Matsumoto	4,870,634
