= 2022 U.S. Open (golf) =

122nd U.S. Open - golf

Tournament information
- Dates: June 16–19, 2022
- Location: Brookline, Massachusetts; 42°19′N 71°9′W
- Course: The Country Club
- Organized by: USGA
- Tours: PGA Tour; European Tour; Japan Golf Tour

Statistics
- Par: 70
- Length: 7,264 yards (6,642 m)
- Field: 156 players, 64 after cut
- Cut: 143 (+3)
- Prize fund: $17,500,000
- Winner's share: $3,150,000

Champion
- (England) Matt Fitzpatrick
- 274 (−6)
- Location in the United States Location in Massachusetts

The 2022 United States Open Championship was the 122nd U.S. Open, the national open golf championship of the United States. It was a 72-hole stroke play tournament that was played between June 16–19 at The Country Club in Brookline, Massachusetts, a suburb west of Boston. It was the club's fourth U.S. Open, having been held there in 1913, 1963, and 1988.

Matt Fitzpatrick won his first major championship, finishing the tournament with a score of 274, six-under-par, a shot ahead of Scottie Scheffler and Will Zalatoris. The win was also Fitzpatrick's first on the PGA Tour. He had previously won the U.S. Amateur at The Country Club, in 2013, and matched Jack Nicklaus, who won both at Pebble Beach, as the only players to win the U.S. Amateur and U.S. Open on the same course. Zalatoris, who lost in a playoff a month earlier at the PGA Championship, had a 14-foot birdie putt on the 18th green that would have forced a playoff but missed, and had his second consecutive runner-up finish in a major championship.

== Course ==
Composite Course

Hole	Name	Yards	Par	Hole	Name	Yards	Par
1	Polo Field	488	4	10	Himalayas	499	4
2	Cottage	215	3	11	Redan	131	3
3	Pond	499	4	12	Stockton	473	4
4	Newton	493	4	13	Primrose 1&2	450	4
5	Bakers	310	4	14	Primrose 8	619	5
6	Plateau	192	3	15	Liverpool	510	4
7	Corner	375	4	16	Clyde	202	3
8	Quarry	557	5	17	Elbow	373	4
9	Primrose 9	427	4	18	Home	451	4
Out		3,556	35	In		3,708	35
				Total		7,264	70

Yardage by round

Round	Hole	1	2	3	4	5	6	7	8	9	Out	10	11	12	13	14	15	16	17	18	In	Total
Round	Par	4	3	4	4	4	3	4	5	4	35	4	3	4	4	5	4	3	4	4	35	70
1st	Yards	490	208	490	482	315	196	368	548	432	3,529	500	122	468	467	624	516	201	381	444	3,723	7,252
2nd	Yards	496	217	496	490	305	165	380	547	421	3,517	504	136	476	440	616	500	191	364	449	3,676	7,193
3rd	Yards	498	217	488	485	314	197	364	560	420	3,543	502	141	467	433	622	503	175	379	445	3,667	7,210
Final	Yards	484	221	500	488	301	158	385	561	422	3,520	503	108	471	438	625	527	209	362	444	3,687	7,207

== Field ==
The field for the U.S. Open is made up of players who gain entry through qualifying events and those who are exempt from qualifying. The exemption criteria include provision for recent major champions, winners of major amateur events, and leading players in the world rankings. Qualifying is in two stages, local and final, with some players being exempted through to final qualifying.

As with all editions of the U.S. Open, eligibility to play is under the sole jurisdiction of the United States Golf Association to the exclusion of the PGA Tour, Professional Golfers' Association of America or any other organization. In early June 2022, several exempt players resigned or were suspended from the PGA Tour in order to compete in the LIV Golf Invitational Series, which held its inaugural event in England one week prior to the U.S. Open. The USGA subsequently confirmed that those players would remain eligible to play in the U.S. Open.

=== Exemptions ===
This list details the exemption criteria for the 2022 U.S. Open and the players who qualified under them. Players are listed under the first criterion by which they qualified; any additional criteria under which a player was exempt are indicated in parentheses. (Note: (a) – denotes amateur.)

1. Recent winners of the U.S. Open (2012–2021)

- Bryson DeChambeau (11,18)
- Dustin Johnson (6,11,18)
- Brooks Koepka (2,7,11,18)
- Jon Rahm (2,11,18)
- Justin Rose (18)
- Webb Simpson (18)
- Jordan Spieth (8,11,18)
- Gary Woodland
- Martin Kaymer did not play. (Note: Martin Kaymer withdrew due to injury; he was replaced by David Lingmerth.)

2. The leading ten players, and those tying for tenth place, in the 2021 U.S. Open

- Daniel Berger (11,18)
- Harris English (11,18)
- Branden Grace
- Rory McIlroy (11,18)
- Guido Migliozzi
- Collin Morikawa (7,8,11,18)
- Louis Oosthuizen (11,18)
- Xander Schauffele (11,15,18)
- Scottie Scheffler (6,11,12,18)
- Paul Casey did not play. (Note: Paul Casey withdrew due to an ongoing back injury; he was replaced by Adam Hadwin.)

3. The winner of the 2021 U.S. Senior Open

- Jim Furyk

4. The winner of the 2021 U.S. Amateur

- James Piot

5. Winners of the 2021 U.S. Junior Amateur and U.S. Mid-Amateur, and the runner-up in the 2021 U.S. Amateur (Note: Players qualifying in this category must remain an amateur through the conclusion of the U.S. Open.)

- Nick Dunlap (a)
- Austin Greaser (a)
- Stewart Hagestad (a)

6. Recent winners of the Masters Tournament (2018–2022)

- Hideki Matsuyama (11,12,18)
- Patrick Reed (11,18)
- Tiger Woods did not play.

7. Recent winners of the PGA Championship (2017–2022)

- Phil Mickelson
- Justin Thomas (9,11,18)

8. Recent winners of The Open Championship (2017–2021)

- Shane Lowry (18)
- Francesco Molinari

9. Recent winners of The Players Championship (2021–2022)

- Cameron Smith (11,18)

10. The winner of the 2021 BMW PGA Championship

- Billy Horschel (11,18)

11. All players who qualified for the 2021 Tour Championship

- Sam Burns (12,18)
- Patrick Cantlay (12,18)
- Stewart Cink
- Corey Conners (18)
- Tony Finau (18)
- Sergio García (18)
- Viktor Hovland (18)
- Im Sung-jae (18)
- Jason Kokrak (18)
- Kevin Na (18)
- Joaquín Niemann (18)
- Erik van Rooyen
- Abraham Ancer (18) did not play. (Note: Abraham Ancer withdrew due to illness; he was replaced by Patton Kizzire.)

12. Winners of multiple PGA Tour events (Note: Events must carry full-point allocation towards the FedEx Cup.) from the 2021 U.S. Open to the start of the 2022 tournament

- Max Homa (18)

13. The winner of the 2021 Amateur Championship

- Laird Shepherd (a)

14. The winner of the Mark H. McCormack Medal in 2021

- Keita Nakajima (a)

15. The winner of the 2020 Olympic Gold Medal

16. The leading 10 points winners from the "European Qualifying Series" (Note: The European Qualifying Series consists of four tournaments: Betfred British Masters, Soudal Open, Dutch Open and Porsche European Open.) who are not otherwise exempt

- Wil Besseling
- Ryan Fox
- Sam Horsfield
- Richard Mansell
- Thorbjørn Olesen
- Yannik Paul
- Victor Perez
- Kalle Samooja
- Marcel Schneider
- Sebastian Söderberg

17. The leading player from each of the 2020–21–22 Asian Tour, 2021–22 PGA Tour of Australasia and 2021–22 Sunshine Tour Orders of Merit

- Tom Kim
- Jediah Morgan
- Shaun Norris

18. The leading 60 players on the Official World Golf Ranking as of May 23, 2022

- Adri Arnaus
- Richard Bland
- Keegan Bradley
- Matt Fitzpatrick
- Tommy Fleetwood
- Talor Gooch
- Brian Harman
- Tyrrell Hatton
- Russell Henley
- Lucas Herbert
- Tom Hoge
- Kim Si-woo
- Kevin Kisner
- Lee Kyoung-hoon
- Min Woo Lee
- Marc Leishman
- Sebastián Muñoz
- Alex Norén
- Mito Pereira
- Thomas Pieters
- Séamus Power
- Adam Scott
- Sepp Straka
- Cameron Tringale
- Harold Varner III
- Cameron Young
- Will Zalatoris

19. The leading 60 players on the Official World Golf Ranking if not otherwise exempt as of June 6, 2022

- Luke List
- Aaron Wise

20. Special exemptions

=== Qualifiers ===
Eleven final qualifying events were held, nine of which were in the United States:

Date	Location	Venue	Field	Spots	Qualifiers (Note: (L) – denotes a player who progressed through local qualifying.)
May 23	Yokoshibahikari, Chiba, Japan	Caledonian Golf Club	28	3	Daijiro Izumida, Todd Sinnott, Tomoyasu Sugiyama
May 23	Dallas, Texas	Lakewood Country Club and Royal Oaks Country Club	98	13	Sean Crocker, Rikuya Hoshino, Mackenzie Hughes, Kurt Kitayama, Jinichiro Kozuma, Matthew NeSmith, Andrew Novak, Davis Shore (L), Ben Silverman, Roger Sloan, Scott Stallings, Nick Taylor, Travis Vick (a)
Jun 6	Milton, Ontario, Canada	RattleSnake Point Golf Club	25	3	Jonas Blixt, Satoshi Kodaira, Callum Tarren
Jun 6	San Francisco, California	The Olympic Club	88	5	Luke Gannon (L), Taylor Montgomery, William Mouw (a), Jesse Mueller, Charlie Reiter (a,L)
Jun 6	Jupiter, Florida	The Club at Admiral's Cove	70	4	Fred Biondi (a), Ryan Gerard (L), Keith Greene (L), Sean Jacklin (L)
Jun 6	Roswell, Georgia	Ansley Golf Club	68	4	Erik Barnes, Harry Hall, Matt McCarty (L), Chase Seiffert
Jun 6	Rockville, Maryland	Woodmont Country Club	73	4	Andrew Beckler (L), Joseph Bramlett, Kevin Chappell, Grayson Murray
Jun 6	Purchase, New York	Century Country Club and Old Oaks Country Club	92	5	Chris Gotterup (L), Caleb Manuel (a,L), Brandon Matthews, Fran Quinn (L), Michael Thorbjornsen (a)
Jun 6	Columbus, Ohio	Kinsale Golf and Fitness Club and Wedgewood Golf and Country Club	106	13	Sam Bennett (a), Hayden Buckley, Wyndham Clark, Joel Dahmen, Lanto Griffin, Chan Kim, Danny Lee, Denny McCarthy, Chris Naegel (L), Andrew Putnam, Davis Riley, Patrick Rodgers, Adam Schenk
Jun 6	Springfield, Ohio	Springfield Country Club	77	8	M. J. Daffue, Adrien Dumont de Chassart (a), Bo Hoag, Beau Hossler, Troy Merritt, Maxwell Moldovan (a), Sam Stevens (L), Brian Stuard
Jun 6	Bend, Oregon	Pronghorn Resort	65	3	Brady Calkins (L), Ben Lorenz (a,L), Isaiah Salinda (L)

==== Alternates who gained entry ====
The following players gained a place in the field having finished as the leading alternates in the specified final qualifying events:

- Adam Hadwin (Dallas)
- Nick Hardy (Springfield) (Note: Nick Hardy was added to the field after the only remaining players not already qualified who could still meet the category 12 qualification criteria missed the cut at the RBC Canadian Open.)
- David Lingmerth (Columbus)
- Patton Kizzire (Roswell)

== Round summaries ==
=== First round ===
Thursday, June 16, 2022

Adam Hadwin led after the opening day, after a four-under-par round of 66, which included six birdies. Five players were a stroke behind after rounds of 67. A total of 25 players scored under the par of 70 and a further 16 scored level par, so that 41 players were within four strokes of the leader.

Place	Player	Score	To par
1	(Canada) Adam Hadwin	66	−4
T2	(South Africa) M. J. Daffue	67	−3
T2	(United States) Joel Dahmen	67	−3
T2	(Sweden) David Lingmerth	67	−3
T2	(Northern Ireland) Rory McIlroy	67	−3
T2	(England) Callum Tarren	67	−3
T7	(United States) Hayden Buckley	68	−2
T7	(England) Matt Fitzpatrick	68	−2
T7	(United States) Brian Harman	68	−2
T7	(United States) Dustin Johnson	68	−2
T7	(United States) Matthew NeSmith	68	−2
T7	(England) Justin Rose	68	−2
T7	(United States) Aaron Wise	68	−2

=== Second round ===
Friday, June 17, 2022

Joel Dahmen and Collin Morikawa led after the second round with scores of 135, 5-under-par. Morikawa's 66 was the best round of the day. Defending champion Jon Rahm was in a group of five players a stroke behind, while world number one Scottie Scheffler was in another group of five a further shot behind. Overnight leader Adam Hadwin had a 72 to be three strokes behind the leaders. 64 players made the cut, which came at 143, 3-over-par.

Place	Player	Score	To par
T1	(United States) Joel Dahmen	67-68=135	−5
T1	(United States) Collin Morikawa	69-66=135	−5
T3	(United States) Hayden Buckley	68-68=136	−4
T3	(United States) Beau Hossler	69-67=136	−4
T3	(Northern Ireland) Rory McIlroy	67-69=136	−4
T3	(Spain) Jon Rahm	69-67=136	−4
T3	(United States) Aaron Wise	68-68=136	−4
T8	(United States) Nick Hardy	69-68=137	−3
T8	(United States) Brian Harman	68-69=137	−3
T8	(United States) Matthew NeSmith	68-69=137	−3
T8	(United States) Patrick Rodgers	69-68=137	−3
T8	(United States) Scottie Scheffler	70-67=137	−3

=== Third round ===
Saturday, June 18, 2022

Matt Fitzpatrick and Will Zalatoris led after the third round with scores of 206, 4 under par. Zalatoris's 67 was the best round of the day. Jon Rahm was in third place, a stroke behind, with Scottie Scheffler in a group of three a further shot behind. The overnight leaders, Joel Dahmen and Collin Morikawa, dropped down the leaderboard with Dahmen scoring 74 and Morikawa 77.

Place	Player	Score	To par
T1	(England) Matt Fitzpatrick	68-70-68=206	−4
T1	(United States) Will Zalatoris	69-70-67=206	−4
3	(Spain) Jon Rahm	69-67-71=207	−3
T4	(United States) Keegan Bradley	70-69-69=208	−2
T4	(Canada) Adam Hadwin	66-72-70=208	−2
T4	(United States) Scottie Scheffler	70-67-71=208	−2
T7	(United States) Sam Burns	71-67-71=209	−1
T7	(United States) Joel Dahmen	67-68-74=209	−1
T7	(Northern Ireland) Rory McIlroy	67-69-73=209	−1
10	(United States) Nick Hardy	69-68-73=210	E

=== Final round ===
Sunday, June 19, 2022

==== Summary ====
Beginning the round tied for the lead with Will Zalatoris, Matt Fitzpatrick went two-under-par on his front-nine to take a one-shot advantage into the final nine holes at six-under-par. He then bogeyed the 10th hole and three-putted the 11th for another bogey, to fall back to four-under and two strokes behind the leaders. Fitzpatrick holed a 48-foot birdie putt at the 13th hole, to draw level with Zalatoris and retook sole possession of the lead with a 19-foot putt at the 15th.

Zalatoris bogeyed two of his first three holes and was as many as four shots behind the leaders. He then made three birdies in four holes from the 6th hole to the 9th and took the lead with an 18-foot birdie putt at the 11th hole. He bogeyed the 12th and the 15th, after failing to get up-and-down from a greenside bunker, and fell back to four-under-par, before hitting his tee shot on the par-three 16th hole to six feet and making the putt to get within one of Fitzpatick.

Zalatoris had a 12-foot putt for birdie on the 17th hole to draw level with Fitzpatrick, but missed the putt. With a one-shot lead playing the 18th, Fitzpatrick drove into a fairway bunker and played his second shot 18 feet past the hole. He two-putted for par and a round of 68, two-under-par, to finish at six-under for the tournament. Zalatoris, on a nearly identical line to Fitzpatrick, had a 14-foot putt for birdie that would have forced a playoff but it narrowly slid past the left side of the hole. He finished at five-under-par and his second consecutive runner-up finish in a major championship.

World No. 1 and Masters champion Scottie Scheffler made four birdies in his first six holes to take the lead. He then bogeyed the 10th and three-putted the 11th, where his short par putt lipped out of the cup. Despite a birdie on the 17th, Scheffler finished at five-under-par, tied with Zalatoris and narrowly missing becoming only the seventh player to win both the Masters and U.S. Open in the same year.

Hideki Matsuyama had a bogey-free round of 65, the lowest recorded during the week, to jump up to three-under-par and finished alone in fourth place. Defending champion Jon Rahm began the round just a shot off the lead but made five bogeys and only one birdie in a four-over-par 74 to fall outside the top-10, finishing tied for 12th.

==== Final leaderboard ====
Champion
Silver Cup winner (leading amateur)
(a) = amateur
(c) = past champion

Top 10
Place	Player	Score	To par	Money (US$)
1	(England) Matt Fitzpatrick	68-70-68-68=274	−6	3,150,000
T2	(United States) Scottie Scheffler	70-67-71-67=275	−5	1,557,687
T2	(United States) Will Zalatoris	69-70-67-69=275	−5	1,557,687
4	(Japan) Hideki Matsuyama	70-70-72-65=277	−3	859,032
T5	(Northern Ireland) Rory McIlroy (c)	67-69-73-69=278	−2	674,953
T5	(United States) Collin Morikawa	69-66-77-66=278	−2	674,953
T7	(United States) Keegan Bradley	70-69-69-71=279	−1	515,934
T7	(Canada) Adam Hadwin	66-72-70-71=279	−1	515,934
T7	(United States) Denny McCarthy	73-70-68-68=279	−1	515,934
T10	(United States) Joel Dahmen	67-68-74-71=280	E	407,220
T10	(United States) Gary Woodland (c)	69-73-69-69=280	E	407,220

Leaderboard below the top 10
Place	Player	Score	To par	Money ($)
T12	(Republic of Ireland) Séamus Power	71-70-70-70=281	+1	347,058
T12	(Spain) Jon Rahm (c)	69-67-71-74=281	+1	347,058
T14	(United States) Hayden Buckley	68-68-75-71=282	+2	241,302
T14	(United States) Patrick Cantlay	72-71-70-69=282	+2	241,302
T14	(United States) Nick Hardy	69-68-73-72=282	+2	241,302
T14	(Australia) Marc Leishman	70-71-73-68=282	+2	241,302
T14	(Italy) Guido Migliozzi	72-70-74-66=282	+2	241,302
T14	(Colombia) Sebastián Muñoz	74-69-69-70=282	+2	241,302
T14	(United States) Xander Schauffele	70-69-75-68=282	+2	241,302
T14	(Australia) Adam Scott	69-73-72-68=282	+2	241,302
T14	(United States) Cameron Tringale	71-71-71-69=282	+2	241,302
23	(South Korea) Tom Kim	72-68-73-70=283	+3	171,732
T24	(Canada) Mackenzie Hughes	72-69-73-70=284	+4	150,849
T24	(United States) Dustin Johnson (c)	68-73-71-72=284	+4	150,849
T24	(United States) Adam Schenk	70-70-73-71=284	+4	150,849
T27	(United States) Sam Burns	71-67-71-76=285	+5	127,002
T27	(Australia) Min Woo Lee	73-70-69-73=285	+5	127,002
T27	(Belgium) Thomas Pieters	72-68-73-72=285	+5	127,002
T27	(United States) Aaron Wise	68-68-75-74=285	+5	127,002
T31	(South Africa) M. J. Daffue	67-72-78-69=286	+6	100,331
T31	(United States) Andrew Putnam	72-68-74-72=286	+6	100,331
T31	(United States) Davis Riley	72-67-73-74=286	+6	100,331
T31	(United States) Patrick Rodgers	69-68-75-74=286	+6	100,331
T31	(Australia) Todd Sinnott	71-71-74-70=286	+6	100,331
T31	(England) Callum Tarren	67-72-78-69=286	+6	100,331
T37	(United States) Joseph Bramlett	71-72-72-72=287	+7	75,916
T37	(South Korea) Lee Kyoung-hoon	71-72-73-71=287	+7	75,916
T37	(United States) Matthew NeSmith	68-69-74-76=287	+7	75,916
T37	(England) Justin Rose (c)	68-73-74-72=287	+7	75,916
T37	(United States) Jordan Spieth (c)	72-70-71-74=287	+7	75,916
T37	(United States) Justin Thomas	69-72-72-74=287	+7	75,916
T43	(England) Richard Bland	70-72-72-74=288	+8	59,332
T43	(United States) Chris Gotterup	73-69-75-71=288	+8	59,332
T43	(United States) Brian Harman	68-69-75-76=288	+8	59,332
T43	(United States) Travis Vick (a)	70-69-76-73=288	+8	
T47	(United States) Max Homa	69-73-75-72=289	+9	50,672
T47	(Chile) Joaquín Niemann	71-70-76-72=289	+9	50,672
T49	(United States) Sam Bennett (a)	70-73-74-73=290	+10	
T49	(Sweden) David Lingmerth	67-72-74-77=290	+10	44,038
T49	(United States) Patrick Reed	70-71-75-74=290	+10	44,038
T49	(United States) Sam Stevens	71-72-72-75=290	+10	44,038
T53	(United States) Beau Hossler	69-67-78-77=291	+11	40,630
T53	(Sweden) Sebastian Söderberg	71-70-78-72=291	+11	40,630
55	(United States) Brooks Koepka (c)	73-67-75-77=292	+12	39,432
T56	(Netherlands) Wil Besseling	71-71-77-74=293	+13	38,511
T56	(United States) Bryson DeChambeau (c)	71-71-76-75=293	+13	38,511
T56	(England) Tyrrell Hatton	72-71-76-74=293	+13	38,511
T56	(United States) Chris Naegel	73-69-77-74=293	+13	38,511
60	(United States) Brandon Matthews	71-69-79-77=296	+16	37,589
T61	(United States) Harris English	73-69-78-77=297	+17	37,221
T61	(United States) Austin Greaser (a)	72-70-76-79=297	+17	
63	(United States) Grayson Murray	75-67-76-80=298	+18	36,843
64	(United States) Stewart Hagestad (a)	73-70-79-77=299	+19	
CUT	(United States) Erik Barnes	71-73=144	+4	
CUT	(United States) Stewart Cink	73-71=144	+4	
CUT	(United States) Wyndham Clark	70-74=144	+4	
CUT	(Canada) Corey Conners	71-73=144	+4	
CUT	(United States) Jim Furyk (c)	74-70=144	+4	
CUT	(Spain) Sergio García	74-70=144	+4	
CUT	(United States) Billy Horschel	73-71=144	+4	
CUT	(South Korea) Im Sung-jae	72-72=144	+4	
CUT	(United States) Kevin Kisner	73-71=144	+4	
CUT	(United States) Jason Kokrak	69-75=144	+4	
CUT	(Republic of Ireland) Shane Lowry	72-72=144	+4	
CUT	(United States) Matt McCarty	71-73=144	+4	
CUT	(Chile) Mito Pereira	70-74=144	+4	
CUT	(United States) James Piot	69-75=144	+4	
CUT	(Finland) Kalle Samooja	77-67=144	+4	
CUT	(United States) Webb Simpson (c)	70-74=144	+4	
CUT	(United States) Cameron Young	72-72=144	+4	
CUT	(United States) Daniel Berger	70-75=145	+5	
CUT	(United States) Tony Finau	73-72=145	+5	
CUT	(New Zealand) Ryan Fox	74-71=145	+5	
CUT	(United States) Talor Gooch	74-71=145	+5	
CUT	(South Africa) Branden Grace	76-69=145	+5	
CUT	(United States) Tom Hoge	73-72=145	+5	
CUT	(United States) Chan Kim	73-72=145	+5	
CUT	(South Korea) Kim Si-woo	76-69=145	+5	
CUT	(Japan) Satoshi Kodaira	74-71=145	+5	
CUT	(United States) Luke List	72-73=145	+5	
CUT	(United States) Taylor Montgomery	72-73=145	+5	
CUT	(United States) Kevin Na	75-70=145	+5	
CUT	(Canada) Ben Silverman	72-73=145	+5	
CUT	(United States) Brian Stuard	73-72=145	+5	
CUT	(Canada) Nick Taylor	73-72=145	+5	
CUT	(United States) Harold Varner III	72-73=145	+5	
CUT	(United States) Russell Henley	76-70=146	+6	
CUT	(England) Sam Horsfield	73-73=146	+6	
CUT	(United States) Troy Merritt	75-71=146	+6	
CUT	(Italy) Francesco Molinari	73-73=146	+6	
CUT	(Sweden) Alex Norén	73-73=146	+6	
CUT	(South Africa) Louis Oosthuizen	77-69=146	+6	
CUT	(United States) Davis Shore	74-72=146	+6	
CUT	(Canada) Roger Sloan	76-70=146	+6	
CUT	(Australia) Cameron Smith	72-74=146	+6	
CUT	(United States) Scott Stallings	74-72=146	+6	
CUT	(United States) Michael Thorbjornsen (a)	77-69=146	+6	
CUT	(Spain) Adri Arnaus	76-71=147	+7	
CUT	(Sweden) Jonas Blixt	75-72=147	+7	
CUT	(Belgium) Adrien Dumont de Chassart (a)	72-75=147	+7	
CUT	(England) Tommy Fleetwood	72-75=147	+7	
CUT	(United States) Ryan Gerard	74-73=147	+7	
CUT	(United States) Lanto Griffin	72-75=147	+7	
CUT	(United States) Bo Hoag	72-75=147	+7	
CUT	(Norway) Viktor Hovland	70-77=147	+7	
CUT	(United States) Kurt Kitayama	74-73=147	+7	
CUT	(United States) Maxwell Moldovan (a)	75-72=147	+7	
CUT	(United States) Andrew Novak	73-74=147	+7	
CUT	(France) Victor Perez	73-74=147	+7	
CUT	(Japan) Rikuya Hoshino	77-71=148	+8	
CUT	(United States) Patton Kizzire	74-74=148	+8	
CUT	(Japan) Keita Nakajima (a)	73-75=148	+8	
CUT	(South Africa) Shaun Norris	70-78=148	+8	
CUT	(United States) Andrew Beckler	78-71=149	+9	
CUT	(United States) Brady Calkins	76-73=149	+9	
CUT	(United States) Kevin Chappell	73-76=149	+9	
CUT	(United States) William Mouw (a)	75-74=149	+9	
CUT	(United States) Chase Seiffert	74-75=149	+9	
CUT	(Austria) Sepp Straka	77-72=149	+9	
CUT	(Japan) Daijiro Izumida	73-77=150	+10	
CUT	(Germany) Yannik Paul	77-73=150	+10	
CUT	(South Africa) Erik van Rooyen	78-72=150	+10	
CUT	(England) Harry Hall	74-77=151	+11	
CUT	(New Zealand) Danny Lee	76-75=151	+11	
CUT	(England) Richard Mansell	77-74=151	+11	
CUT	(United States) Phil Mickelson	78-73=151	+11	
CUT	(Denmark) Thorbjørn Olesen	75-76=151	+11	
CUT	(United States) Charlie Reiter (a)	76-75=151	+11	
CUT	(England) Laird Shepherd (a)	75-76=151	+11	
CUT	(Brazil) Fred Biondi (a)	79-73=152	+12	
CUT	(United States) Nick Dunlap (a)	78-74=152	+12	
CUT	(Japan) Tomoyasu Sugiyama	74-78=152	+12	
CUT	(Australia) Lucas Herbert	74-79=153	+13	
CUT	(Japan) Jinichiro Kozuma	76-77=153	+13	
CUT	(United States) Ben Lorenz (a)	77-76=153	+13	
CUT	(United States) Fran Quinn	76-77=153	+13	
CUT	(United States) Jesse Mueller	80-74=154	+14	
CUT	(United States) Isaiah Salinda	79-75=154	+14	
CUT	(United States) Luke Gannon	76-80=156	+16	
CUT	(Australia) Jediah Morgan	82-74=156	+16	
CUT	(United States) Caleb Manuel (a)	83-74=157	+17	
CUT	(Germany) Marcel Schneider	78-79=157	+17	
CUT	(United States) Sean Crocker	83-75=158	+18	
CUT	(Scotland) Sean Jacklin	78-80=158	+18	
CUT	(United States) Keith Greene	83-81=164	+24	

==== Scorecard ====
Hole	1	2	3	4	5	6	7	8	9	10	11	12	13	14	15	16	17	18
Par	4	3	4	4	4	3	4	5	4	4	3	4	4	5	4	3	4	4
(England) Fitzpatrick	−4	−4	−5	−5	−6	−5	−5	−6	−6	−5	−4	−4	−5	−5	−6	−6	−6	−6
(United States) Scheffler	−3	−4	−4	−5	−5	−6	−6	−6	−6	−5	−4	−4	−4	−4	−4	−4	−5	−5
(United States) Zalatoris	−4	−3	−2	−2	−2	−3	−4	−4	−5	−5	−6	−5	−5	−5	−4	−5	−5	−5
(Japan) Matsuyama	+2	+2	+2	+2	+2	+1	E	E	E	E	E	−1	−2	−2	−2	−3	−3	−3
(Northern Ireland) McIlroy	−2	−2	−1	−2	−1	−2	−1	−1	−1	−1	E	E	E	−1	−2	−2	−2	−2
(United States) Morikawa	+2	+2	+2	+1	+2	+2	+2	+1	+1	+1	E	E	−1	−1	−1	−1	−2	−2
(United States) Bradley	−1	E	+1	+1	+1	+1	E	−1	E	E	−1	−1	−1	−1	E	E	−1	−1
(Canada) Hadwin	−2	−1	−1	−2	−2	−1	−1	−1	−1	−1	−1	−1	−1	−1	E	−1	−2	−1
(Spain) Rahm	−3	−3	−3	−3	−2	−2	−2	−1	−1	E	−1	E	E	E	E	+1	+1	+1

Cumulative tournament scores, relative to par

Birdie	Bogey
