= ISPS Handa Championship in Japan =

Professional golf tournament

Coordinates: 36.214°N 140.375°E

ISPS Handa Championship
Tournament information
- Location: Gotemba, Japan
- Established: 2022
- Courses: Taiheiyo Club (Gotemba Course)
- Par: 70
- Length: 7,262 yards (6,640 m)
- Tours: European Tour; Japan Golf Tour
- Format: Stroke play
- Prize fund: US$2,250,000
- Month played: April
- Final year: 2024

Tournament record score
- Aggregate: 260 Yuto Katsuragawa (2022)
- To par: −24 as above

Final champion
- (Japan) Yuto Katsuragawa
- Location in Japan Location in the Shizuoka Prefecture

The ISPS Handa Championship in Japan was a professional golf tournament that was held at PGM Ishioka Golf Club in Omitama, Japan between 2022 and 2023. In 2024, the tournament moved to the Taiheiyo Club in Gotemba (also host of the Mitsui Sumitomo Visa Taiheiyo Masters).

== History ==
The tournament was created in 2022, originally intended to be a co-sanctioned European Tour and Japan Golf Tour event. It was to be the first ever European Tour sanctioned event to take place in Japan.

However, in February 2022, it was announced that the event would proceed as a sole-sanctioned Japan Golf Tour event due to travel restrictions caused by the COVID-19 pandemic. It is intended that the tournament will return to the European Tour schedule in 2023. Due to the rescheduling, the ISPS Handa Championship in Spain was held the same week as a replacement event on the European Tour's 2022 schedule.

Yuto Katsuragawa won the inaugural event, beating Rikuya Hoshino by one shot.

The 2023 edition returned to the European Tour schedule and was played as a co-sanctioned event alongside the Japan Golf Tour. Lucas Herbert won the tournament, beating Aaron Cockerill in a playoff.

Following the announcement of the 2025 Japan Golf Tour schedule, it was confirmed that the tournament would not return in 2025.

== Winners ==
Year	Tours (Note: EUR − European Tour; JPN − Japan Golf Tour.)	Winner	Score	To par	Margin of victory	Runner-up
ISPS Handa Championship
2024	EUR, JPN	(Japan) Yuto Katsuragawa (2)	263	−17	3 strokes	(Sweden) Sebastian Söderberg
ISPS Handa Championship in Japan
2023	EUR, JPN	(Australia) Lucas Herbert	265	−15	Playoff	(Canada) Aaron Cockerill
2022	~~EUR~~, JPN	(Japan) Yuto Katsuragawa	260	−24	1 stroke	(Japan) Rikuya Hoshino
