= Yuto Katsuragawa =

Japanese professional golfer

Personal information
- Nationality: Japan
- Born: 9 October 1998 (age 28) Kiyosu, Aichi, Japan
- Height: 167 cm (5 ft 6 in)
- Weight: 70 kg (154 lb)

Career
- Sport: Golf
- College: Nihon University
- Turned professional: 2020
- Current tours: European Tour; Japan Golf Tour
- Former tour: Korn Ferry Tour
- Professional wins: 5

Number of wins by tour
- European Tour: 2
- Japan Golf Tour: 3
- Other: 1

Best results in major championships
- Masters Tournament: DNP
- PGA Championship: DNP
- U.S. Open: 58th: 2023
- The Open Championship: T47: 2022

Achievements and awards
- Japan Golf Tour Rookie of the Year: 2022

Yuto Katsuragawa (Japanese: 桂川有人, born 9 October 1998) is a Japanese professional golfer who plays on the Japan Golf Tour and European Tour. He has won the ISPS Handa Championship twice.

== Career ==
Katsuragawa turned professional in the fall of 2020 and won his first professional event on the Japan Challenge Tour a year later. In 2022, he won the ISPS Handa Championship in Japan and claimed Japan Golf Tour Rookie of the Year honors.

He qualified for the 150th Open Championship by finishing runner-up at the 2022 SMBC Singapore Open, behind Sadom Kaewkanjana. At the Old Course at St Andrews he shot a final round 69 to finish in a tie for 47th.

Katsuragawa spent 2023 mainly on the Korn Ferry Tour, where he recorded two top-20 finishes, and qualified for the 2023 U.S. Open where he made the cut.

In April 2024, Katsuragawa claimed his first victory on the European Tour when he won the co-sanctioned ISPS Handa Championship for a second time.

== Amateur wins ==
- 2015 Philippine Amateur Open Match Play Championship
- 2018 Chubu Amateur Championship, Japan Collegiate Championship

== Professional wins (5) ==
=== European Tour wins (2) ===
No.	Date	Tournament	Winning score	Margin of victory	Runner(s)-up
1	28 Apr 2024	ISPS Handa Championship^{1}	−17 (70-65-65-63=263)	3 strokes	(Sweden) Sebastian Söderberg
2	25 Oct 2026	Genesis Championship^{2}	−13 (69-68-63-71=271)	2 strokes	(France) Martin Couvra, (France) Frédéric Lacroix

^{1}Co-sanctioned by the Japan Golf Tour
^{2}Co-sanctioned by the Korean Tour

=== Japan Golf Tour wins (3) ===
No.	Date	Tournament	Winning score	Margin of victory	Runner-up
1	24 Apr 2022	ISPS Handa Championship in Japan	−24 (67-63-65-65=260)	1 stroke	(Japan) Rikuya Hoshino
2	28 Apr 2024	ISPS Handa Championship^{1} (2)	−17 (70-65-65-63=263)	3 strokes	(Sweden) Sebastian Söderberg
3	1 Nov 2026	Vantelin Tokai Classic	−12 (65-69-71-67=272)	1 stroke	(Japan) Hiroki Tanaka

^{1}Co-sanctioned by the European Tour

Japan Golf Tour playoff record (0–1)

No.	Year	Tournament	Opponent	Result
1	2022	Token Homemate Cup	(Japan) Jinichiro Kozuma	Lost to birdie on first extra hole

=== Japan Challenge Tour wins (1) ===
No.	Date	Tournament	Winning score	Margin of victory	Runner-up
1	8 Oct 2021	Ryo Ishikawa Everyone Project Challenge	−15 (69-65-67=201)	3 strokes	(Japan) Yu Morimoto

== Results in major championships ==
Tournament	2022	2023	2024
Masters Tournament			
PGA Championship			
U.S. Open		58	
The Open Championship	T47		CUT

Did not play

CUT = missed the halfway cut
"T" = tied
