= 2022 European Tour =

Golf tour season

2022 European Tour season
- Duration: 25 November 2021 – 20 November 2022
- Number of official events: 43 (Note: A further seven tournaments were scheduled but were either cancelled, postponed or otherwise removed from the schedule.)
- Most wins: (Scotland) Ewen Ferguson (2) (Note: Scottie Scheffler also won two events, but was not a European Tour member.) (New Zealand) Ryan Fox (2) (Spain) Pablo Larrazábal (2) (South Africa) Thriston Lawrence (2) (Spain) Jon Rahm (2)
- DP World Tour Rankings: (Northern Ireland) Rory McIlroy
- Player of the Year: (New Zealand) Ryan Fox
- Sir Henry Cotton Rookie of the Year: (South Africa) Thriston Lawrence

The 2022 European Tour, titled as the 2022 DP World Tour for sponsorship reasons, was the 51st season of the European Tour, the main professional golf tour in Europe since its inaugural season in 1972.

== DP World title sponsorship ==
In November 2021, it was announced that the tour had signed a title sponsorship agreement with DP World, being renamed as the DP World Tour. The agreement was reported to be worth US$400,000,000 over 10 years.

== Changes for 2022 ==
Many tournaments had been confirmed independently ahead of the official announcement in November 2021, when the majority of the tournaments were confirmed along with the DP World title sponsorship agreement. The schedule included the four major championships as usual; however the World Golf Championships were downgraded to just two events. The Rolex Series had risen to five events, seeing the inclusion of the Slync.io Dubai Desert Classic for the first time.

As part of a new "strategic alliance" between the European Tour and PGA Tour, there were three regular tournaments co-sanctioned by the PGA Tour; these events were the Genesis Scottish Open, the Barbasol Championship and the Barracuda Championship. It was also confirmed that the "strategic alliance" would see an increased prize fund for the Horizon Irish Open, rising to US$6,000,000.

Other additions to the schedule included the Ras Al Khaimah Championship, the Ras Al Khaimah Classic, the MyGolfLife Open, the Steyn City Championship, the ISPS Handa Championship in Spain and the Catalunya Championship.

== Response to LIV Golf ==
Following a statement produced by the European Tour on 24 June 2022, they confirmed that players who competed in the inaugural LIV Golf Invitational Series event in London would be fined £100,000 as well as being prohibited from competing in events co-sanctioned with the PGA Tour (which prohibits members from participating in the LIV series). These events were the Genesis Scottish Open, the Barbasol Championship and the Barracuda Championship.

== Schedule ==
The following table lists official events during the 2022 season.

Date	Tournament	Host country	Purse	DPWTR points	Winner (Note: The number in brackets after each winner's name is the number of European Tour events they had won up to and including that tournament. This information is only shown for European Tour members.)	OWGR points	Other tours (Note: AFR − Sunshine Tour; JPN − Japan Golf Tour; LET − Ladies European Tour; PGAT − PGA Tour.)	Notes
27 Nov	Joburg Open	South Africa	R17,500,000	2,000 (Note: Event reduced to 36 holes due to weather and impending COVID-19 related travel restrictions. Due to the shortening of the event, only 75% of the full DP World Tour Ranking points were awarded.)	(South Africa) Thriston Lawrence (1)	19	AFR	
~~5 Dec~~	SA Open Championship	South Africa	–	–	Removed (Note: With impending COVID-19 related travel restrictions in and out of South Africa affecting the makeup of the field, the event was removed from the European Tour schedule. It proceeded as a sole-sanctioned Sunshine Tour event.)	–	~~AFR~~ (Note: Sunshine Tour flagship event)	
~~12 Dec~~	Alfred Dunhill Championship	South Africa	–	–	Cancelled	–	AFR	
23 Jan	Abu Dhabi HSBC Championship	UAE	US$8,000,000	8,000	(Belgium) Thomas Pieters (6)	46		Rolex Series
30 Jan	Slync.io Dubai Desert Classic	UAE	US$8,000,000	8,000	(Norway) Viktor Hovland (2)	48		Rolex Series
6 Feb	Ras Al Khaimah Championship	UAE	US$2,000,000	2,750	(Denmark) Nicolai Højgaard (2)	24		New tournament
13 Feb	Ras Al Khaimah Classic	UAE	US$2,000,000	2,750	(New Zealand) Ryan Fox (2)	24		New tournament (Note: In January, the tour announced the postponement of the Commercial Bank Qatar Masters; the Ras Al Khaimah Classic was added to the schedule as a replacement.)
~~20 Feb~~	Hero Indian Open	India	–	–	Cancelled (Note: The Hero Indian Open was originally scheduled for 24–27 February 2022; in December 2021 it was brought forward a week to fill the space originally reserved for a fifth consecutive tournament in the Middle East. In February 2022, it was announced that the tournament had been postponed to a later date. Just a week before the event was scheduled to start, it was cancelled.)	–		
6 Mar	Magical Kenya Open	Kenya	€1,750,000	2,750	(China) Wu Ashun (4)	24		
13 Mar	MyGolfLife Open	South Africa	US$1,500,000	2,000	(Spain) Pablo Larrazábal (6)	23	AFR	New tournament
20 Mar	Steyn City Championship	South Africa	US$1,500,000	2,000	(South Africa) Shaun Norris (1)	19	AFR	New tournament
27 Mar; ~~13 Feb~~	Commercial Bank Qatar Masters	Qatar	US$2,000,000	2,750	(Scotland) Ewen Ferguson (1)	24		
27 Mar	WGC-Dell Technologies Match Play	United States	US$12,000,000	8,000	(United States) Scottie Scheffler (n/a)	74		World Golf Championship
10 Apr	Masters Tournament	United States	US$15,000,000	10,000	(United States) Scottie Scheffler (n/a)	100		Major championship
~~24 Apr~~	ISPS Handa Championship in Japan	Japan	–	–	Removed (Note: On 18 February 2022, the tour announced the addition of two new tournaments in Spain, the ISPS Handa Championship in Spain and the Catalunya Championship, to replace the ISPS Handa Championship in Japan, which proceeded as a sole-sanctioned Japan Golf Tour event, and the postponed Volvo China Open.)	–	~~JPN~~	New tournament
24 Apr	ISPS Handa Championship in Spain	Spain	US$2,000,000	2,750	(Spain) Pablo Larrazábal (7)	24		New tournament
~~1 May~~	Volvo China Open	China	–	–	Postponed	–		
1 May	Catalunya Championship	Spain	US$2,000,000	2,750	(Spain) Adri Arnaus (1)	24		New tournament
8 May	Betfred British Masters	England	£1,850,000	3,500	(Denmark) Thorbjørn Olesen (6)	24		
15 May	Soudal Open	Belgium	US$2,000,000	2,750	(England) Sam Horsfield (3)	24		
22 May	PGA Championship	United States	US$15,000,000	10,000	(United States) Justin Thomas (4)	100		Major championship
29 May	Dutch Open	Netherlands	€1,750,000	2,750	(France) Victor Perez (2)	24		
5 Jun	Porsche European Open	Germany	€1,750,000	2,750	(Finland) Kalle Samooja (1)	24		
12 Jun	Volvo Car Scandinavian Mixed	Sweden	US$2,000,000	2,750	(Sweden) Linn Grant (n/a)	24 (Note: OWGR points at the Volvo Car Scandinavian Mixed were awarded based on men's scores only. Henrik Stenson and Marc Warren tied for the lowest men's score and split the assigned points for first and second places, each earning 19.2 points.)	LET	Mixed event (Note: Field of 78 men and 78 women playing from different sets of tees. Tour ranking and world ranking points based on finish among men's field only.)
19 Jun	U.S. Open	United States	US$17,500,000	10,000	(England) Matt Fitzpatrick (8)	100		Major championship
26 Jun	BMW International Open	Germany	€2,000,000	2,750	(China) Li Haotong (3)	24		
3 Jul	Horizon Irish Open	Ireland	US$6,000,000	6,000	(Poland) Adrian Meronk (1)	28		
10 Jul	Genesis Scottish Open	Scotland	US$8,000,000	8,000	(United States) Xander Schauffele (2)	70	PGAT	Rolex Series
10 Jul	Barbasol Championship	United States	US$3,700,000	4,250	(United States) Trey Mullinax (n/a)	24	PGAT	New to European Tour
17 Jul	The Open Championship	Scotland	US$14,000,000	10,000	(Australia) Cameron Smith (n/a)	100		Major championship
17 Jul	Barracuda Championship	United States	US$3,700,000	4,250	(United States) Chez Reavie (1)	24	PGAT	New to European Tour
24 Jul	Cazoo Classic	England	€1,750,000	2,750	(Scotland) Richie Ramsay (4)	24		
31 Jul	Hero Open	Scotland	€1,750,000	2,750	(United States) Sean Crocker (1)	24		
7 Aug	Cazoo Open	Wales	€1,750,000	2,750	(England) Callum Shinkwin (2)	24		
14 Aug	ISPS Handa World Invitational	Northern Ireland	US$1,500,000	2,000	(Scotland) Ewen Ferguson (2)	8.17		
21 Aug	D+D Real Czech Masters	Czech Republic	€1,750,000	2,750	(Germany) Maximilian Kieffer (1)	10.34		
28 Aug	Omega European Masters	Switzerland	€2,000,000	2,750	(South Africa) Thriston Lawrence (2)	16.02		
4 Sep	Made in HimmerLand	Denmark	€3,000,000	4,250	(England) Oliver Wilson (2)	16.25		
11 Sep	BMW PGA Championship	England	US$8,000,000	8,000	(Republic of Ireland) Shane Lowry (6)	38.04		Rolex Series
18 Sep	DS Automobiles Italian Open	Italy	€3,000,000	4,250	(Scotland) Robert MacIntyre (2)	24.28		
25 Sep	Cazoo Open de France	France	€3,000,000	4,250	(Italy) Guido Migliozzi (3)	18.55		
2 Oct	Alfred Dunhill Links Championship	Scotland	US$5,000,000	5,500	(New Zealand) Ryan Fox (3)	32.14		Pro-Am
9 Oct	Acciona Open de España	Spain	€1,750,000	2,750	(Spain) Jon Rahm (8)	14.20		
16 Oct	Estrella Damm N.A. Andalucía Masters	Spain	€3,000,000	4,250	(Spain) Adrián Otaegui (4)	20.18		
23 Oct (Note: On 12 August 2022, the tour announced the addition of the Mallorca Golf Open and the Portugal Masters, as well as the cancellation of the Cyprus Open.)	Mallorca Golf Open	Spain	US$2,000,000	2,750	(Germany) Yannik Paul (1)	13.48		
~~30 Oct~~	WGC-HSBC Champions	China	–	–	Cancelled	–		World Golf Championship
30 Oct	Portugal Masters	Portugal	US$2,000,000	2,750	(England) Jordan Smith (2)	13.27		
~~6 Nov~~	Cyprus Open	Cyprus	–	–	Cancelled	–		
13 Nov	Nedbank Golf Challenge	South Africa	US$6,000,000	7,000	(England) Tommy Fleetwood (6)	14.92	AFR (Note: Sunshine Tour unofficial event)	Limited-field event
20 Nov	DP World Tour Championship	UAE	US$10,000,000	12,000	(Spain) Jon Rahm (9)	21.82		Tour Championship (Note: Also a Rolex Series tournament.)

=== Unofficial events ===
The following events were sanctioned by the European Tour, but did not carry official money, nor were wins official.

Date	Tournament	Host country	Purse	Winner	OWGR points	Notes
5 Jul	J. P. McManus Pro-Am	Ireland	£1,000,000	(United States) Xander Schauffele	n/a	Pro-Am

== Location of tournaments ==
Location of tournaments in Europe.
Major championship
Flagship event
Rolex Series event
Regular event
Location of tournaments outside Europe.
Major championship
World Golf Championships
Rolex Series event
Regular event

Fife, Scotland
United Arab Emirates
South Africa
Gauteng, South Africa

== DP World Tour Rankings ==
=== Points distribution ===
The distribution of DP World Tour Ranking points for 2022 European Tour events were as follows:

Finishing position	Total pts	1st	2nd	3rd	4th	5th	6th	7th	8th	9th	10th	20th	30th	40th	50th	60th
Major championships	10,000	1,665	1,113	627	500	424	350	300	250	223	200	120	90	68	48	30
Rolex Series & WGCs	8,000	1,335	889	500	400	339	280	240	200	178	160	96	72	54	38	24
Nedbank Golf Challenge	7,000	1,165	780	438	350	297	245	210	175	156	140	84	63	47	33	21
Regular tournament (Band 6) (Note: Tournaments with purses ranging from $5,000,000 to $5,499,999.)	5,500	915	612	345	275	234	192	165	138	123	110	66	50	37	28	17
Regular tournament (Band 4) (Note: Tournaments with purses ranging from $3,250,000 to $3,999,999.)	4,250	710	472	266	212	180	149	128	106	95	85	51	38	29	20	13
Regular tournament (Band 3) (Note: Tournaments with purses ranging from $2,500,000 to $3,249,999.)	3,500	585	389	218	175	148	123	105	88	78	70	42	32	24	17	11
Regular tournament (Band 2) (Note: Tournaments with purses ranging from $1,750,000 to $2,499,999.)	2,750	460	305	172	137	116	97	83	69	61	55	33	25	19	13	8
Regular tournament (Band 1) (Note: Tournaments with purses ranging from $1,000,000 to $1,749,999.)	2,000	335	222	125	100	84	70	60	50	44	40	24	18	14	10	6
DP World Tour Championship	12,000	2,000	1,335	752	600	509	420	359	300	267	240	144	108	82	58	36

=== Final standings ===
The DP World Tour Rankings were based on tournament results during the season, calculated using a points-based system.

Pos.	Player	Majors				WGCs		Rolex Series					Top 10s in other ET events										Total pts	Tmts	Money (Note: In addition to tournament prize money, the top five point scorers received a share of a $5m bonus pool.)	
Pos.	Player	Mas	PGA	USO	Opn	WGC MP	WGC Cha	Abu	Dub	Sco	BMW PGA	DPW TC	1	2	3	4	5	6	7	8	9	10	Total pts	Tmts	Reg. (€m)	Bon. ($m)
1	(Northern Ireland) McIlroy	2nd 1113	8th 250	T5; 387	3rd 627	•	C A N C E L L E D	T12; 116	3rd 500	•	T2; 695	4th 600	4th 212	T4; 255									4,754	10	5.5	2.0
2	(New Zealand) Fox	•	54th 40	CUT; 0	CUT; 0	•	C A N C E L L E D	61st 24	T26; 78	T47; 38	WD; 0	19th 148	1st 460	T9; 53	T8; 65	T2; 239	2nd 305	3rd 172	2nd 667	1st 915	T4; 127	2nd 780	4,174	24	3.4	1.2
3	(Spain) Rahm	T27; 96	T48; 47	T12; 167	T34; 73	T9; 138	C A N C E L L E D	•	•	T55; 28	T2; 695	1st 2000	1st 460										3,703	9	4.6	0.7
4	(England) Fitzpatrick	T14; 131	T5; 358	1st 1665	T21; 108	T18; 93	C A N C E L L E D	•	•	T6; 225	T42; 46	T5; 465	2nd 472										3,620	11	4.9	0.6
5	(England) Fleetwood	T14; 131	T5; 358	CUT; 0	T4; 462	T35; 45	C A N C E L L E D	T48; 38	T12; 121	T4; 370	T57; 24	T5; 465	T10; 47	1st 1165									3,301	14	3.4	0.5
6	(Norway) Hovland	T27; 96	T41; 60	CUT; 0	T4; 462	T18; 93	C A N C E L L E D	T4; 370	1st 1335	CUT; 0	T5; 265	T23; 126											2,837	11	2.8	
7	(United States) Zalatoris	T6; 325	2nd 1113	T2; 920	T28; 89	T5; 265	C A N C E L L E D	•	•	CUT; 0	•	•											2,662	6	3.9	
8	(Poland) Meronk	•	•	•	T42; 60	•	C A N C E L L E D	WD; 0	T4; 292	CUT; 0	T32; 60	T7; 330	T6; 83	T3; 155	T3; 142	6th 97	3rd 172	1st 1000					2,648	23	2.2	
9	(Republic of Ireland) Lowry	T3; 564	T23; 102	CUT; 0	T21; 108	T35; 45	C A N C E L L E D	T12; 116	T24; 85	•	1st 1335	T23; 126	T9; 117										2,597	11	2.8	
10	(Belgium) Pieters	CUT; 0	T71; 18	T27; 95	T28; 89	T26; 72	C A N C E L L E D	1st 1335	T12; 121	•	T23; 79	•	T9; 50	T10; 49	2nd 305	T8; 57	T3; 219						2,576	15	2.3	

Win
Top 10
Made cut
Missed cut
Withdrew
• Did not play

== Awards ==
Award	Winner	Ref.
Player of the Year (Seve Ballesteros Award)	(New Zealand) Ryan Fox	
Sir Henry Cotton Rookie of the Year	(South Africa) Thriston Lawrence	

== See also ==
- 2022 in golf
- 2022 Challenge Tour
- 2022 European Senior Tour
