= 2022 U.S. Open =

2022 U.S. Open may refer to:

- 2022 U.S. Open (golf), a major golf tournament
- 2022 US Open (tennis), a grand slam tennis tournament
- 2022 U.S. Open Cup, a soccer tournament
