= Wu Ashun =

Chinese golfer

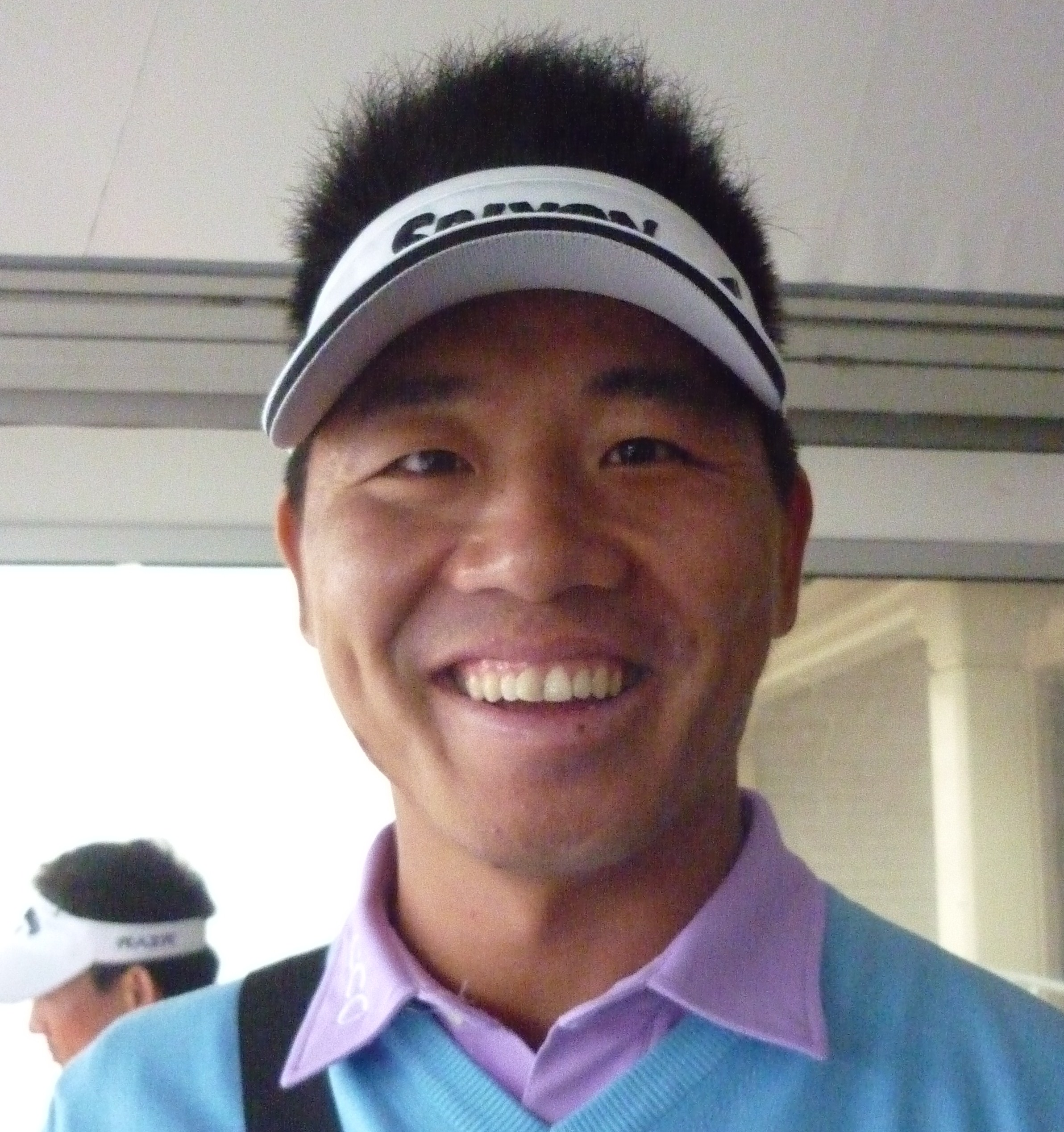

Personal information
- Nationality: China
- Born: 22 June 1985 (age 41) Xiamen, Fujian, China
- Height: 1.83 m (6 ft 0 in)
- Weight: 85 kg (187 lb; 13.4 st)

Career
- Sport: Golf
- Turned professional: 2007
- Current tour: European Tour
- Former tours: Challenge Tour; Japan Golf Tour; Asian Tour; OneAsia Tour
- Professional wins: 7

Number of wins by tour
- European Tour: 5
- Japan Golf Tour: 2

Best results in major championships
- Masters Tournament: DNP
- PGA Championship: DNP
- U.S. Open: DNP
- The Open Championship: CUT: 2013, 2014

Wu Ashun (born 22 June 1985) is a Chinese professional golfer. He has won four times on the European Tour and twice on the Japan Golf Tour. He became the first Chinese golfer to win multiple titles on the European Tour with his win at the 2016 Lyoness Open.

== Professional career ==
Wu played on the Asian Tour in 2008 and 2009. His best finish was a tie for fourth place at the 2009 Singha Thailand Open.

Wu played on the Japan Golf Tour in 2010 and from 2012 to 2015. He won his first title in September 2012, at the Toshin Golf Tournament in Ryosen. He was the first golfer from China to win on the Japan Golf Tour.

Wu played on the OneAsia Tour in 2011, finishing 19th on the Order of Merit for that season.

In 2013, Wu won for the second time on the Japan Golf Tour, with a one-stroke victory at the Heiwa PGM Championship.

In April 2015, Wu won the Volvo China Open on the European Tour. He made history as he became the first Chinese player to win a European Tour event on home soil.

Since 2016, Wu has played primarily on the European Tour. In 2016, he won the Lyoness Open and in 2018, he had a third European Tour win, in the KLM Open, which made him the first Chinese player to win three times on the European Tour.

In March 2022, Wu picked up his fourth European Tour victory at the Magical Kenya Open. A final-round 65 saw him beat Aaron Cockerill, Thriston Lawrence and Hurly Long by four shots.

In April 2025, Wu won the Volvo China Open for the second time in his career and his fifth European Tour win. The win came six days short of 10 years since his maiden triumph, which came at the same event in 2015.

== Professional wins (7) ==
=== European Tour wins (5) ===
No.	Date	Tournament	Winning score	Margin of victory	Runner(s)-up
1	26 Apr 2015	Volvo China Open^{1}	−9 (73-66-69-71=279)	1 stroke	(England) David Howell
2	12 Jun 2016	Lyoness Open	−13 (69-72-65-69=275)	1 stroke	(Spain) Adrián Otaegui
3	16 Sep 2018	KLM Open	−16 (64-66-71-67=268)	1 stroke	(England) Chris Wood
4	6 Mar 2022	Magical Kenya Open	−16 (69-68-66-65=268)	4 strokes	(Canada) Aaron Cockerill, (South Africa) Thriston Lawrence, (Germany) Hurly Long
5	20 Apr 2025	Volvo China Open^{2} (2)	−14 (68-70-67-65=270)	1 stroke	(England) Jordan Smith

^{1}Co-sanctioned by the OneAsia Tour
^{2}Co-sanctioned by the China Tour

=== Japan Golf Tour wins (2) ===
No.	Date	Tournament	Winning score	Margin of victory	Runner-up
1	9 Sep 2012	Toshin Golf Tournament	−18 (65-66-67=198) (Note: Shortened to 54 holes due to weather.)	Playoff	(Japan) Yuta Ikeda
2	10 Nov 2013	Heiwa PGM Championship	−11 (67-66-65-75=273)	1 stroke	(South Korea) Kim Hyung-sung

Japan Golf Tour playoff record (1–0)

No.	Year	Tournament	Opponent	Result
1	2012	Toshin Golf Tournament	(Japan) Yuta Ikeda	Won with birdie on fourth extra hole

=== OneAsia Tour wins (1) ===
No.	Date	Tournament	Winning score	Margin of victory	Runner-up
1	26 Apr 2015	Volvo China Open^{1}	−9 (73-66-69-71=279)	1 stroke	(England) David Howell

^{1}Co-sanctioned by the European Tour

== Results in major championships ==
Tournament	2013	2014
Masters Tournament		
U.S. Open		
The Open Championship	CUT	CUT
PGA Championship		

Did not play

CUT = missed the half-way cut

== Results in World Golf Championships ==
Results not in chronological order before 2015.

Tournament	2009	2010	2011	2012	2013	2014	2015	2016	2017	2018	2019
Championship											
Match Play											
Invitational											
Champions	T70		T49	T36	T68	T14	T58	T23	T20	T64	T73

Did not play

"T" = tied

== Team appearances ==
- Royal Trophy (representing Asia): 2012 (winners), 2013
- Dongfeng Nissan Cup (representing China): 2013
- World Cup (representing China): 2013, 2016, 2018
- EurAsia Cup (representing Asia): 2016
