= Min Woo Lee =

Australian professional golfer (born 1998)

Personal information
- Nicknames: Dr. Chipinski, Woozy, The Chef
- Nationality: Australia
- Born: 27 July 1998 (age 28) Perth, Western Australia, Australia

Career
- Sport: Golf
- Turned professional: 2019
- Current tours: PGA Tour; European Tour; PGA Tour of Australasia
- Professional wins: 5
- Highest ranking: 22 (30 March 2025) (as of 25 October 2026)

Number of wins by tour
- PGA Tour: 1
- European Tour: 3
- Asian Tour: 1
- PGA Tour of Australasia: 2

Best results in major championships
- Masters Tournament: T14: 2022
- PGA Championship: T18: 2023, 2026
- U.S. Open: T5: 2023
- The Open Championship: T21: 2022

- Min Woo Lee
- Hangul: 이민우
- Hanja: 李玟雨
- RR: I Minu
- MR: I Minu

Min Woo Lee (born 27 July 1998) is an Australian professional golfer who plays on the PGA Tour and the European Tour. He won the 2020 ISPS Handa Vic Open, the 2021 Abrdn Scottish Open and the 2023 Fortinet Australian PGA Championship on the European Tour. He also won the 2023 SJM Macao Open on the Asian Tour.

== Professional career ==
Lee turned professional at the start of 2019. He played a number of events on the European Tour and had early success, finishing 4th in the Saudi International and tied for 5th in the ISPS Handa World Super 6 Perth, both events played in February. These were, however, his only top-10 finishes of the season and he finished 117th in the Order of Merit. In October he was tied for 6th in the Genesis Championship on the Korean Tour. At the end of the year he was solo 3rd in the AVJennings NSW Open and then tied for 3rd in the Australian PGA Championship, an early season event on the 2020 European Tour.

In February 2020, Lee won the ISPS Handa Vic Open, an event co-sanctioned with by the European Tour and the PGA Tour of Australasia.

In July 2021, Lee defeated Thomas Detry and Matt Fitzpatrick in a playoff at the Abrdn Scottish Open. With this win, he earned entry into the 2021 Open Championship.

In May 2023, Lee earned special temporary membership on the PGA Tour.

In October 2023, Lee won the SJM Macao Open on the Asian Tour. He shot a tournament record of 254 (30-under-par) and won wire-to-wire by two shots ahead of Poom Saksansin. One month later, Lee won the Fortinet Australian PGA Championship.

On 30 March 2025, Lee earned his first PGA Tour victory by winning the Texas Children's Houston Open, beating Gary Woodland and world number one Scottie Scheffler by one stroke.

On 15 February 2026, Lee finished joint runner-up with Sepp Straka behind Collin Morikawa at the AT&T Pebble Beach Pro-Am, marking his best ever finish at a PGA Tour Signature Event.

== Personal life ==
Lee's parents, Soonam and Clara Lee, are both from South Korea, and emigrated to Australia in the early 1990s. Lee's older sister, Minjee, is also a professional golfer. When Min Woo Lee won the 2016 U.S. Junior Amateur, they became the first brother/sister pair to win the USGA's junior championships, Minjee Lee having won the U.S. Girls' Junior in 2012.

Lee has a large social media presence, with over 800,000 followers on Instagram and 300,000 on TikTok. His presence has led to him being described as possibly the "first golf cult hero" by Golf Magazine.

Lee is a Fremantle Dockers fan, of the Australian Football League.

== Amateur wins ==
- 2013 Drummond Junior
- 2014 Drummond Junior
- 2015 Western Australia Amateur, Drummond Junior, Aaron Baddeley International Junior Championship
- 2016 U.S. Junior Amateur
- 2017 Western Australia Amateur
- 2018 South Australia Amateur Classic

== Professional wins (5) ==
=== PGA Tour wins (1) ===
No.	Date	Tournament	Winning score	Margin of victory	Runners-up
1	30 Mar 2025	Texas Children's Houston Open	−20 (66-64-63-67=260)	1 stroke	(United States) Scottie Scheffler, (United States) Gary Woodland

=== European Tour wins (3) ===
Legend
Rolex Series (1)
Other European Tour (2)

No.	Date	Tournament	Winning score	Margin of victory	Runner(s)-up
1	9 Feb 2020	ISPS Handa Vic Open^{1}	−19 (66-67-68-68=269)	2 strokes	(New Zealand) Ryan Fox
2	11 Jul 2021	Abrdn Scottish Open	−18 (68-69-65-64=266)	Playoff	(Belgium) Thomas Detry, (England) Matt Fitzpatrick
3	26 Nov 2023 (2024 season)	Fortinet Australian PGA Championship^{1}	−20 (64-66-66-68=264)	3 strokes	(Japan) Rikuya Hoshino

^{1}Co-sanctioned by the PGA Tour of Australasia

European Tour playoff record (1–0)

No.	Year	Tournament	Opponents	Result
1	2021	Abrdn Scottish Open	(Belgium) Thomas Detry, (England) Matt Fitzpatrick	Won with birdie on first extra hole

=== Asian Tour wins (1) ===
No.	Date	Tournament	Winning score	Margin of victory	Runner-up
1	15 Oct 2023	SJM Macao Open	−30 (62-64-65-63=254)	2 strokes	(Thailand) Poom Saksansin

=== PGA Tour of Australasia wins (2) ===
No.	Date	Tournament	Winning score	Margin of victory	Runner-up
1	9 Feb 2020	ISPS Handa Vic Open^{1}	−19 (66-67-68-68=269)	2 strokes	(New Zealand) Ryan Fox
2	26 Nov 2023	Fortinet Australian PGA Championship^{1}	−20 (64-66-66-68=264)	3 strokes	(Japan) Rikuya Hoshino

^{1}Co-sanctioned by the European Tour

== Results in major championships ==
Tournament	2021	2022	2023	2024	2025	2026
Masters Tournament		T14	CUT	T22	49	CUT
PGA Championship		CUT	T18	T26	CUT	T18
U.S. Open		T27	T5	T21	CUT	CUT
The Open Championship	CUT	T21	T41	CUT	CUT	T59

Top 10
Did not play

CUT = missed the half-way cut
"T" = tied

=== Summary ===
Tournament	Wins	2nd	3rd	Top-5	Top-10	Top-25	Events	Cuts made
Masters Tournament	0	0	0	0	0	2	5	3
PGA Championship	0	0	0	0	0	2	5	3
U.S. Open	0	0	0	1	1	2	5	3
The Open Championship	0	0	0	0	0	1	6	3
Totals	0	0	0	1	1	7	21	12

- Most consecutive cuts made – 6 (2023 PGA – 2024 U.S. Open)
- Longest streak of top-10s – 1 (2023 U.S. Open)

== Results in The Players Championship ==
Tournament	2023	2024	2025	2026
The Players Championship	T6	T54	T20	T32

Top 10

"T" indicates a tie for a place

== Results in World Golf Championships ==
Tournament	2021	2022	2023
Championship	T28		
Match Play		T26	T31
Invitational	62		
Champions	NT^{1}	NT^{1}	

^{1}Cancelled due to COVID-19 pandemic

Did not play

"T" = Tied
NT = No tournament
Note that the Championship and Invitational were discontinued from 2022. The Champions was discontinued from 2023.

== Team appearances ==
Amateur

- Nomura Cup (representing Australia): 2017
- Bonallack Trophy (representing Asia/Pacific): 2018 (winners)
- Eisenhower Trophy (representing Australia): 2018
- Sloan Morpeth Trophy (representing Australia): 2016 (winners)

Professional

- Presidents Cup (representing the International team): 2024, 2026
