= Catalunya Championship =

Golf tournament in Catalonia, Spain

Coordinates: 41.572°N 2.056°E

Tournament information
- Location: Barcelona, Catalonia, Spain
- Established: 2022
- Course: Real Club de Golf El Prat
- Par: 72
- Length: 7,057 yards (6,453 m)
- Tour: European Tour
- Format: Stroke play
- Prize fund: US$2,750,000
- Month played: May

Tournament record score
- Aggregate: 260 Yurav Premlall (2026)
- To par: −28 as above

Current champion
- (South Africa) Yurav Premlall

Location map
- Location in Spain Location in Catalonia

The Catalunya Championship is a professional golf tournament held in Catalonia, Spain. It first appeared on the European Tour schedule in 2022.

== History ==
The tournament was created as a one-off event after the Volvo China Open, originally scheduled to take place the same week, was postponed. It was played the week after the ISPS Handa Championship in Spain; another one-off event created for the 2022 schedule.

Adri Arnaus won the event by shooting a final-round 65 to tie Oliver Bekker at 11 under-par. Arnaus defeated Bekker in a six hole sudden-death playoff.

The event made a return in 2026, now with Estrella Damm as title sponsor.

== Winners ==
Year	Winner	Score	To par	Margin of victory	Runner-up	Venue
Estrella Damm Catalunya Championship
2026	(South Africa) Yurav Premlall	260	−28	14 strokes	(South Africa) Shaun Norris	El Prat
Catalunya Championship
2023–2025: No tournament
2022	(Spain) Adri Arnaus	277	−11	Playoff	(South Africa) Oliver Bekker	PGA Catalunya (Stadium Course)
