= Aaron Cockerill =

Canadian professional golfer

Personal information
- Nationality: Canada
- Born: 27 April 1992 (age 34) Teulon, Manitoba, Canada

Career
- Sport: Golf
- College: Texas A&M University–Commerce; University of Idaho
- Turned professional: 2015
- Current tour: European Tour
- Former tours: Challenge Tour; PGA Tour Canada

Achievements and awards
- Manitoba Amateur Golfer of the Year: 2010, 2013

Aaron Cockerill (born 17 April 1992) is a Canadian professional golfer and European Tour player. He was runner-up at the 2022 Magical Kenya Open, as well as the 2023 ISPS Handa Championship in Japan, losing in a playoff to Lucas Herbert.

== Amateur career ==
Cockerill played golf at Stonewall Collegiate High School, where he was a four-time zone champion and served as team captain for three years. He played three years on the Team Manitoba province squad.

Cockerill had a successful year in 2010, winning the Manitoba Junior Men's Championship and finished 10th at the Canadian Amateur Championship. He also won the Golf Canada Western Future Links Championship and was the medalist at the Manitoba Match Play Championship. He was the low individual at the Provincial Junior Interclub, helping Teulon capture the rural division. He also finished second at the Rural Junior Championship, and received the Manitoba Amateur Golfer of the Year Award.

In 2010, Cockerill enrolled at Texas A&M University–Commerce and played with the Texas A&M–Commerce Lions golf team. He led the team in scoring average, and was a business administration major.

In 2011, he transferred to University of Idaho, where he played with the Idaho Vandals golf team and earned first-team all-Western Athletic Conference honors as a senior and graduated in 2014.

== Professional career ==
Cockerill turned professional in 2015, and played on the PGA Tour Canada between 2016 and 2018 with limited success.

In 2019, he joined the Challenge Tour, where he recorded back-to-back top-10 finishes at the Hopps Open de Provence, Lalla Aïcha Challenge Tour, and Stone Irish Challenge to finish 49th in the season rankings.

Cockerill tied for 5th at Q-school and joined the 2020 European Tour. In his rookie season he opened with a 64 and 68 at the Joburg Open to set the early clubhouse target, and finished the tournament tied for 4th.

In 2022, he was runner-up at the Magical Kenya Open. Cockerill was again in contention at the ISPS Handa Championship in Spain, where he shot a 62 and set the clubhouse target on a weather-affected day three. He finished the tournament tied for third, two strokes behind winner Pablo Larrazábal.

Cockerill made a hole-in-one on the opening day of the 2022 Omega European Masters, to collect a CHF 30,000 life insurance policy. He made a second ace in the space of a week, on the 16th hole at Made in HimmerLand. With all the hole-in-one chatter in the recording area he forgot to sign his scorecard, and got disqualified.

Cockerill started the 2023 season with a tie for 4th at the Alfred Dunhill Championship.

== Amateur wins ==
- 2010 Manitoba Junior Men's Championship, Western Future Links Championship

== Playoff record ==
European Tour playoff record (0–1)

No.	Year	Tournament	Opponent	Result
1	2023	ISPS Handa Championship in Japan	(Australia) Lucas Herbert	Lost to birdie on second extra hole

== See also ==
- 2019 European Tour Qualifying School graduates
- 2025 European Tour Qualifying School graduates
