= 2019 Big Easy Tour =

Golf tour season

2019 Big Easy Tour season
- Duration: 15 April 2019 – 29 November 2019
- Number of official events: 19
- Most wins: (South Africa) Kyle Barker (2) (South Africa) Malcolm Mitchell (2) (South Africa) Jason Smith (2) (South Africa) Matthew Spacey (2) (South Africa) Desne van den Bergh (2)
- Order of Merit: (South Africa) Malcolm Mitchell

The 2019 Big Easy Tour was the ninth season of the Big Easy Tour, the official development tour to the Sunshine Tour.

== Schedule ==
The following table lists official events during the 2019 season.

| Date | Tournament | Location | Purse (R) | Winner (Note: The number in brackets after each winner's name is the number of Big Easy Tour events they had won up to and including that tournament. It is rare for someone to accumulate many wins on the Big Easy Tour as success at this level usually leads to promotion to the Sunshine Tour.) | OWGR points |
|---|---|---|---|---|---|
| 17 Apr | Big Easy Challenge 1 | Gauteng | 75,000 | (South Africa) Matthew Spacey (1) | 3 |
| 1 May | Big Easy Challenge 2 | Gauteng | 75,000 | (South Africa) Yurav Premlall (a) (1) | 3 |
| 15 May | Big Easy Challenge 3 | North West | 75,000 | (South Africa) Garrick Higgo (1) | 3 |
| 5 Jun | Big Easy Challenge 4 | Gauteng | 75,000 | (South Africa) Matthew Spacey (2) | 3 |
| 26 Jun | Big Easy Challenge 5 | Gauteng | 75,000 | (South Africa) Jason Smith (1) | 3 |
| 3 Jul | Big Easy Challenge 6 | Gauteng | 75,000 | (South Africa) Malcolm Mitchell (1) | 3 |
| 24 Jul | Big Easy Challenge 7 | Gauteng | 75,000 | (South Africa) Kyle Barker (1) | 3 |
| 31 Jul | Big Easy Challenge 8 | Gauteng | 75,000 | (South Africa) Desne van den Bergh (1) | 3 |
| 14 Aug | Big Easy Challenge 9 | Gauteng | 75,000 | (South Africa) Kyle Barker (2) | 3 |
| 28 Aug | Big Easy Challenge 10 | Gauteng | 75,000 | (South Africa) Coert Groenewald (1) | 3 |
| 11 Sep | Big Easy Challenge 11 | Gauteng | 75,000 | (South Africa) Ruan de Smidt (1) | 3 |
| 27 Sep | Big Easy Challenge 12 | Gauteng | 75,000 | (South Africa) Jason Smith (2) | 3 |
| 2 Oct | Big Easy Challenge 13 | Gauteng | 75,000 | (South Africa) Malcolm Mitchell (2) | 3 |
| 9 Oct | Big Easy Challenge 14 | Gauteng | 75,000 | (South Africa) Hennie O'Kennedy (1) | 3 |
| 23 Oct | Big Easy Challenge 15 | Gauteng | 75,000 | (South Africa) Byron Coetzee (1) | 3 |
| 30 Oct | Big Easy Challenge 16 | Gauteng | 75,000 | (South Africa) Marthin Scheepers (1) | 3 |
| 6 Nov | Big Easy Challenge 17 | Gauteng | 75,000 | (South Africa) Jason Froneman (1) | 3 |
| 13 Nov | Big Easy Challenge 18 | Gauteng | 75,000 | (South Africa) Desne van den Bergh (2) | 3 |
| 29 Nov | Big Easy Tour Championship | Gauteng | 200,000 | (South Africa) Theunis Bezuidenhout (1) | 3 |

== Order of Merit ==
The Order of Merit was based on prize money won during the season, calculated in South African rand. The top six players on the Order of Merit earned status to play on the 2020–21 Sunshine Tour.

| Position | Player | Prize money (R) |
|---|---|---|
| 1 | (South Africa) Malcolm Mitchell | 74,097 |
| 2 | (South Africa) Jason Smith | 57,706 |
| 3 | (South Africa) Matthew Spacey | 53,544 |
| 4 | (South Africa) Hennie O'Kennedy | 50,320 |
| 5 | (South Africa) Desne van den Bergh | 49,559 |
| 6 | (South Africa) Coert Groenewald | 49,220 |
