= Ras Al Khaimah Classic =

Professional golf tournament

Coordinates: 25.690°N 55.776°E

Tournament information
- Location: Ras Al Khaimah, United Arab Emirates
- Established: 2022
- Course: Al Hamra Golf Club
- Par: 72
- Length: 7,325 yards (6,698 m)
- Tour: European Tour
- Format: Stroke play
- Prize fund: US$2,000,000
- Month played: February
- Final year: 2022

Tournament record score
- Aggregate: 266 Ryan Fox (2022)
- To par: −22 as above

Final champion
- (New Zealand) Ryan Fox

Location map
- Location in the United Arab Emirates

The Ras Al Khaimah Classic was a professional golf tournament that was held at Al Hamra Golf Club, in Ras Al Khaimah, United Arab Emirates. The tournament was intended to be a one-off event and was created in January 2022 as a replacement event on the schedule as the Commercial Bank Qatar Masters was postponed. The event was played the week after the inaugural Ras Al Khaimah Championship.

Ryan Fox won the event, cruising to a five-shot victory over Ross Fisher.

== Winners ==
Year	Winner	Score	To par	Margin of victory	Runner-up
2022	(New Zealand) Ryan Fox	266	−22	5 strokes	(England) Ross Fisher
