= Yurav Premlall =

South African professional golfer (born 2003)

Personal information
- Nationality: South Africa
- Born: 17 June 2003 (age 23) Durban, South Africa

Career
- Sport: Golf
- Turned professional: 2023
- Current tours: European Tour; Sunshine Tour
- Former tour: Big Easy Tour
- Professional wins: 3

Number of wins by tour
- European Tour: 1
- Sunshine Tour: 1
- Other: 1

Yurav Premlall (born 17 June 2003) is a South African professional golfer who plays on the European Tour and Sunshine Tour. He won his first European Tour title at the Estrella Damm Catalunya Championship in 2026, winning by 14 shots.

== Early life and amateur career ==
Premlall was born in Durban, South Africa, and began playing golf at around age two. His family later moved from Durban to Gauteng.

In 2018, aged 15 years and five months, Premlall became the youngest amateur to qualify for the South African Open and the youngest player to make the 36-hole cut. He won the Freddie Tait Cup as the leading amateur at the 2021 South African Open Championship. In 2021, he also won the inaugural Nedbank Junior Challenge at Gary Player Country Club.

In 2022, Premlall reached No. 1 in the GolfRSA amateur rankings and represented the International team at the Junior Presidents Cup.

== Professional career ==
Premlall turned professional in 2023, making his professional debut at the Bain's Whisky Cape Town Open.

In September 2024, he won his first professional tournament at the Vodacom Origins of Golf Sishen, shooting a final-round 66 to finish one stroke ahead of Martin Vorster. After finishing sixth on the 2024–25 Sunshine Tour Order of Merit, Premlall earned a DP World Tour card as one of the leading eligible players on the final standings.

Premlall made his Nedbank Golf Challenge debut in 2025 after receiving a personal invitation from Gary Player.

In May 2026, Premlall won the Estrella Damm Catalunya Championship by 14 shots for his first European Tour title. The win came in his 29th European Tour start and was the largest winning margin for a maiden victory in European Tour history. It was also the largest winning margin on the tour outside major championships, one shot short of Tiger Woods' 15-shot victory at the 2000 U.S. Open. The victory gave Premlall exemption on the European Tour through the end of the 2028 season.

== Amateur wins ==
- 2018 Silver Salver, Central Gauteng Open Stroke Play
- 2019 KwaZulu-Natal Amateur Championship, Harry Oppenheimer Trophy
- 2020 North West Open, Harry Oppenheimer Trophy, Central Gauteng Open Stroke Play
- 2021 Northern Amateur Open, Nedbank Junior Challenge
- 2022 Northern Amateur Open, MCB Indian Ocean Open, Central Gauteng Open

== Professional wins (3) ==
=== European Tour wins (1) ===
No.	Date	Tournament	Winning score	Margin of victory	Runner-up
1	10 May 2026	Estrella Damm Catalunya Championship	−28 (70-64-63-63=260)	14 strokes	(South Africa) Shaun Norris

=== Sunshine Tour wins (1) ===
No.	Date	Tournament	Winning score	Margin of victory	Runner-up
1	22 Sep 2024	Vodacom Origins of Golf at Sishen	−11 (69-70-66=205)	1 stroke	(South Africa) Martin Vorster

Sunshine Tour playoff record (0–2)

No.	Year	Tournament	Opponent(s)	Result
1	2024	Gary & Vivienne Player Challenge	(South Africa) Martin Rohwer, (South Africa) Daniel van Tonder	van Tonder won with par on fourth extra hole Premlall eliminated by birdie on second hole
2	2025	Vodacom Origins of Golf at Parys	(South Africa) Herman Loubser	Lost to birdie on first extra hole

=== Big Easy Tour wins (1) ===
No.	Date	Tournament	Winning score	Margin of victory	Runner-up
1	1 May 2019	Big Easy Challenge 2 (as an amateur)	−12 (71-67-66=204)	2 strokes	(South Africa) Christiaan Burke (a)

== Team appearances ==
Amateur

- Junior Presidents Cup (representing International team): 2022
