= Lucas Herbert =

Australian professional golfer (born 1995)

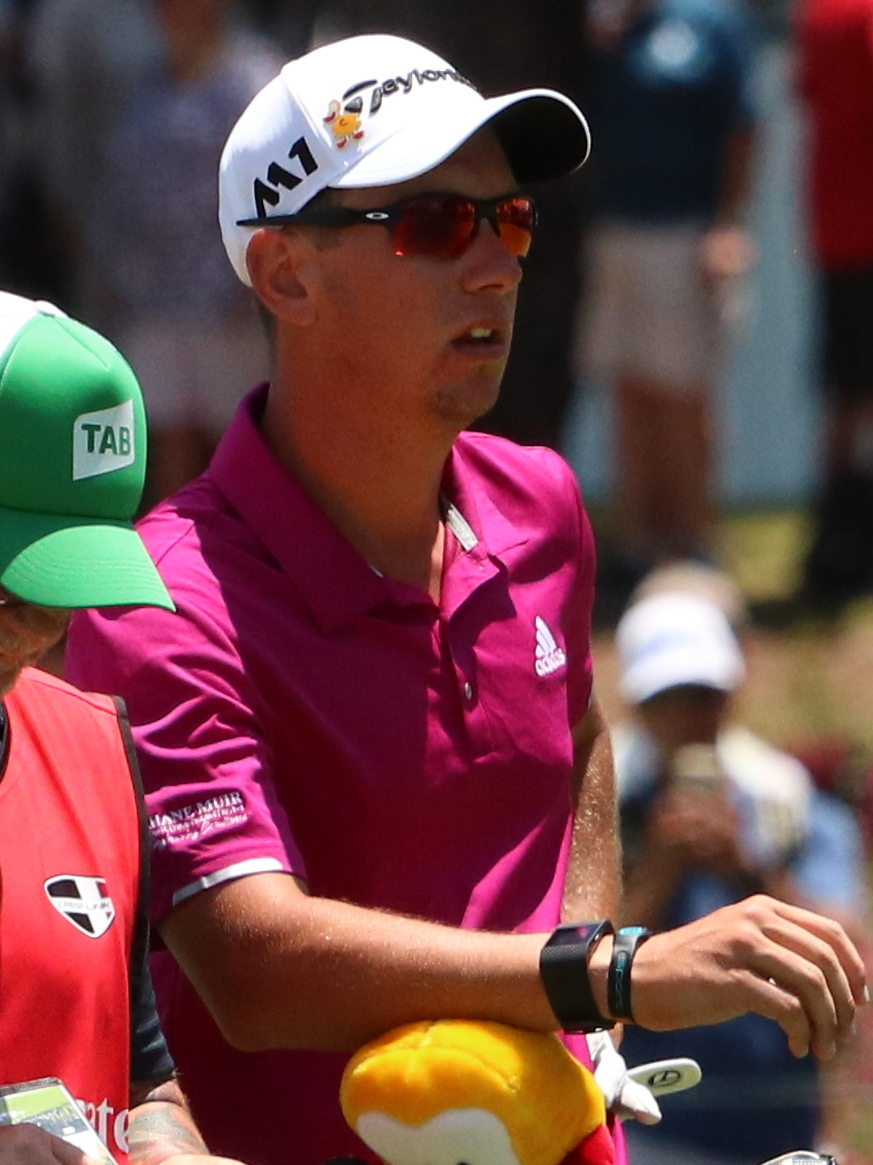
- Herbert in 2017

Personal information
- Nationality: Australia
- Born: 5 December 1995 (age 30) Bendigo, Victoria, Australia
- Height: 6 ft 2 in (1.88 m)
- Weight: 200 lb (91 kg; 14 st)

Career
- Sport: Golf
- Turned professional: 2015
- Current tours: European Tour; PGA Tour of Australasia; LIV Golf
- Former tour: PGA Tour
- Professional wins: 8
- Highest ranking: 40 (9 January 2022) (as of 25 October 2026)

Number of wins by tour
- PGA Tour: 1
- European Tour: 3
- Japan Golf Tour: 1
- Asian Tour: 1
- PGA Tour of Australasia: 1
- LIV Golf: 2

Best results in major championships
- Masters Tournament: CUT: 2022
- PGA Championship: T13: 2022
- U.S. Open: T31: 2020
- The Open Championship: T6: 2026

Lucas Herbert (born 5 December 1995) is an Australian professional golfer. He has won three times on the European Tour and once on the PGA Tour, at the 2021 Bermuda Championship. In 2024, he joined the LIV Golf League and is a member of the Ripper GC team.

== Early life and amateur career ==
Herbert was born on 5 December 1995. He was raised in Bendigo, Victoria and played his junior golf at Neangar Park Golf Club and Commonwealth Golf Club before turning professional. As an amateur he lost in a playoff for the Lexus of Blackburn Heritage Classic, a tournament on the 2013 PGA Tour of Australasia. He represented Australia in the 2014 Eisenhower Trophy where the team finished tied for 6th place. Herbert tied for the second-best individual score, three strokes behind Jon Rahm. He turned professional in late 2015.

== Professional career ==
After turning professional, Herbert played mostly on the PGA Tour of Australasia. In late 2016, he was runner-up in the Isuzu Queensland Open behind amateur Brett Coletta. A year later, in the 2017 New South Wales Open, he was again runner-up, this time to Jason Scrivener and followed this with good finishes in the Emirates Australian Open and Australian PGA Championship.

In 2018, Herbert began playing the European Tour via sponsor exemptions, finishing 47th on the Race to Dubai and ending the year in the world top-100. He was runner-up in the Portugal Masters and had three third-place finishes, including the Sky Sports British Masters. A good result in the SMBC Singapore Open gave him an entry into the 2018 Open Championship where he made the cut. He also qualified for the 2018 U.S. Open, but missed the cut.

Herbert had a 7th-place finish in the 2019 Omega Dubai Desert Classic in January to reach a career high of 73 in the world rankings. However he only had one other top-10 finish, in the Omega European Masters, and finished 107th in the European Tour Order of Merit.

In January 2020, Herbert won his first European Tour event, the Omega Dubai Desert Classic, where he beat Christiaan Bezuidenhout in a playoff, lifting him back into the world top-100. In March 2020, he was runner-up in the New Zealand Open behind Brad Kennedy.

In July 2021 he became a wire-to-wire winner of the Dubai Duty Free Irish Open, finishing three strokes ahead of Rikard Karlberg, a result which qualified him into The Open Championship in two weeks time. The following week, Herbert finished a stroke behind the leaders at the Abrdn Scottish Open, entering into the top 50 in the Official World Golf Ranking for the first time in his career. In August 2021, Herbert earned a place in the Korn Ferry Tour Finals in the category "Numbers 126-200 on PGA Tour Non-Member FedExCup Points List". He finished inside the top 25, to earn a PGA Tour card for the 2021–22 season. In October 2021, he won his first PGA Tour event at the Butterfield Bermuda Championship.

In April 2023, Herbert won the ISPS Handa Championship in Japan, he defeated Aaron Cockerill in a playoff.

In January 2024, it was reported that Herbert would join LIV Golf for the 2024 season. Lucas was part of the Ripper GC team win in Adelaide during April 2024 event, in which they beat Stinger GC in a playoff. Lucas had shot −13 over his three rounds which proved pivotal in securing Ripper GC the win. Lucas and Ripper GC backed up the success in Adelaide up with another team win in Singapore in May 2024.

In the second round of the 2026 Open Championship at Royal Birkdale, he shot a 28 on the opening nine holes to tie the Open record for the lowest nine holes ever. He tied the record held by Denis Durnian who shot 28 in 1983, also at Royal Birkdale.

== Amateur wins ==
- 2011 Tamar Valley Junior Cup, Victoria Junior Amateur
- 2012 New South Wales Boy's Amateur

== Professional wins (8) ==
=== PGA Tour wins (1) ===
No.	Date	Tournament	Winning score	Margin of victory	Runners-up
1	31 Oct 2021	Butterfield Bermuda Championship	−15 (70-65-65-69=269)	1 stroke	(New Zealand) Danny Lee, (United States) Patrick Reed

=== European Tour wins (3) ===
No.	Date	Tournament	Winning score	Margin of victory	Runner-up
1	26 Jan 2020	Omega Dubai Desert Classic	−9 (69-71-71-68=279)	Playoff	(South Africa) Christiaan Bezuidenhout
2	4 Jul 2021	Dubai Duty Free Irish Open	−19 (64-67-70-68=269)	3 strokes	(Sweden) Rikard Karlberg
3	23 Apr 2023	ISPS Handa Championship in Japan^{1}	−15 (67-63-68-67=265)	Playoff	(Canada) Aaron Cockerill

^{1}Co-sanctioned by the Japan Golf Tour

European Tour playoff record (2–0)

No.	Year	Tournament	Opponent	Result
1	2020	Omega Dubai Desert Classic	(South Africa) Christiaan Bezuidenhout	Won with birdie on second extra hole
2	2023	ISPS Handa Championship in Japan	(Canada) Aaron Cockerill	Won with birdie on second extra hole

=== Asian Tour wins (1) ===
Legend
International Series (1)
Other Asian Tour (0)

No.	Date	Tournament	Winning score	Margin of victory	Runners-up
1	11 May 2025	International Series Japan	−20 (62-69-69-64=264)	5 strokes	(South Korea) Song Young-han, (Japan) Yuta Sugiura

=== PGA Tour of Australasia wins (1) ===
No.	Date	Tournament	Winning score	Margin of victory	Runners-up
1	17 Nov 2024	Ford NSW Open	−15 (65-65-72-67=269)	3 strokes	(Australia) Corey Lamb, (Australia) Alex Simpson, (Australia) Cameron Smith

PGA Tour of Australasia playoff record (0–1)

No.	Year	Tournament	Opponents	Result
1	2013	Lexus of Blackburn Heritage Classic (as an amateur)	(Australia) David Bransdon, (Australia) Max McCardle	Bransdon won with birdie on first extra hole

=== LIV Golf League wins (2) ===
No.	Date	Tournament	Winning score	Margin of victory	Runner-up
1	10 May 2026	Maaden LIV Golf Virginia	−24 (64-63-68-69=264)	4 strokes	(Spain) Sergio García
2	26 Jul 2026	LIV Golf UK	−30 (61-66-69-62=258)	6 strokes	(England) Tyrrell Hatton

== Results in major championships ==
Results not in chronological order before 2019 and in 2020.

Tournament	2018	2019	2020	2021	2022	2023	2024	2025	2026
Masters Tournament					CUT				
PGA Championship		T71	CUT	T71	T13	T40	T43		
U.S. Open	CUT		T31		CUT	CUT			CUT
The Open Championship	T51		NT	CUT	T15	CUT		CUT	T6

Top 10
Did not play

CUT = missed the half-way cut
"T" = tied
NT = no tournament due to COVID-19 pandemic

=== Summary ===
Tournament	Wins	2nd	3rd	Top-5	Top-10	Top-25	Events	Cuts made
Masters Tournament	0	0	0	0	0	0	1	0
PGA Championship	0	0	0	0	0	1	6	5
U.S. Open	0	0	0	0	0	0	5	1
The Open Championship	0	0	0	0	1	2	6	3
Totals	0	0	0	0	1	3	18	9

- Most consecutive cuts made – 2 (twice)
- Longest streak of top-10s – 1 (once, current)

== Results in The Players Championship ==
Tournament	2022	2023
The Players Championship	T68	CUT

CUT = missed the halfway cut
"T" indicates a tie for a place

== Results in World Golf Championships ==
Tournament	2020	2021	2022	2023
Championship	T58	70		
Match Play	NT^{1}		T18	R16
Invitational	T49	T36		
Champions	NT^{1}	NT^{1}	NT^{1}	

^{1}Cancelled due to COVID-19 pandemic

Top 10
Did not play

NT = No tournament
"T" = Tied
Note that the Championship and Invitational were discontinued from 2022. The Champions was discontinued from 2023.

== Team appearances ==
Amateur

- Eisenhower Trophy (representing Australia): 2014
- Australian Men's Interstate Teams Matches (representing Victoria): 2013, 2014 (winners), 2015 (winners)

== See also ==
- 2021 Korn Ferry Tour Finals graduates
