= Jinichiro Kozuma =

Japanese professional golfer

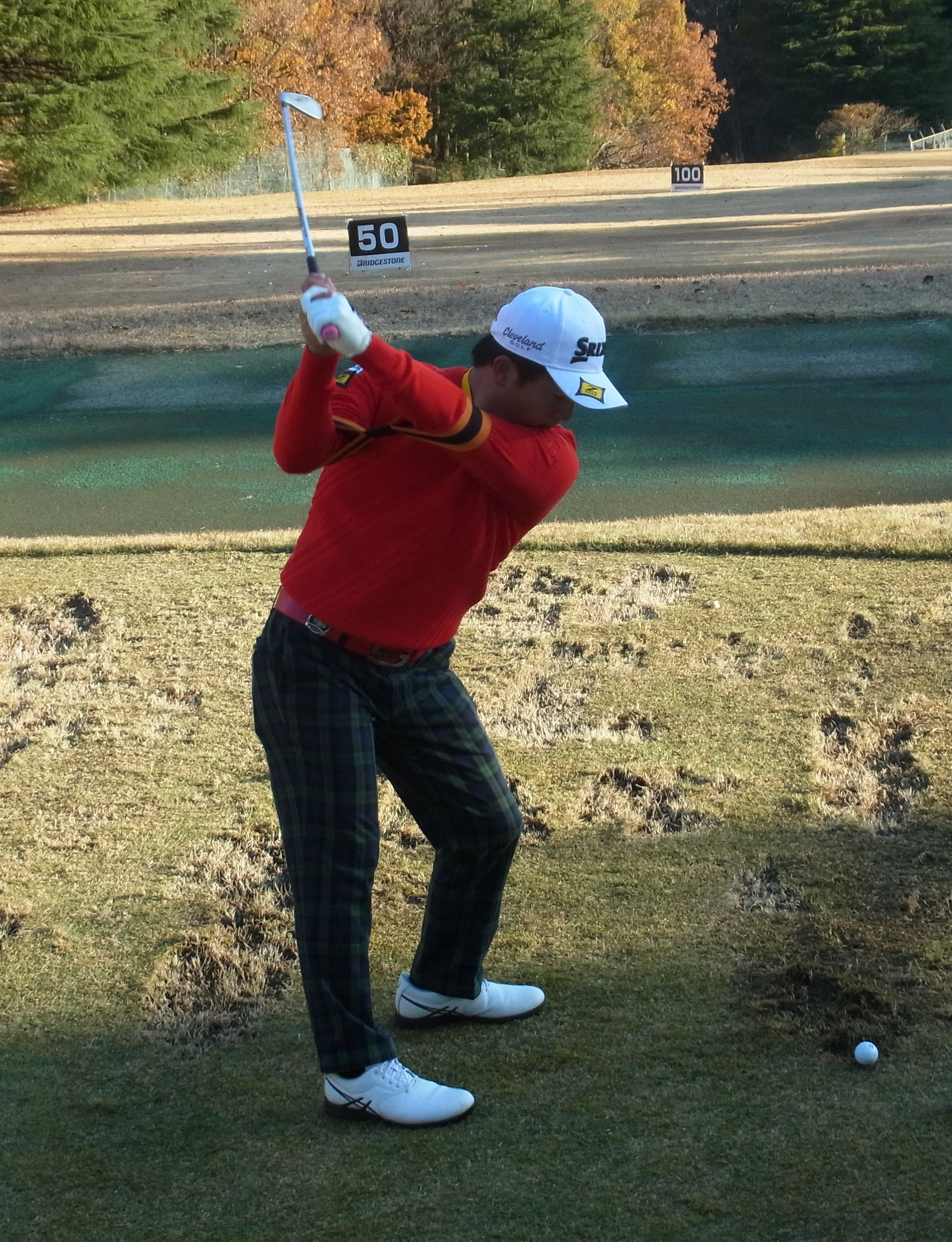

Personal information
- Nationality: Japan
- Born: 7 July 1994 (age 32) Kagoshima Prefecture, Japan
- Height: 1.65 m (5 ft 5 in)
- Weight: 71 kg (157 lb; 11.2 st)

Career
- Sport: Golf
- Turned professional: 2012
- Current tours: Japan Golf Tour; Asian Tour
- Former tours: Japan Challenge Tour; LIV Golf
- Professional wins: 5
- Highest ranking: 94 (3 April 2022) (as of 25 October 2026)

Number of wins by tour
- Japan Golf Tour: 3
- Other: 2

Best results in major championships
- Masters Tournament: DNP
- PGA Championship: CUT: 2022
- U.S. Open: CUT: 2022, 2025
- The Open Championship: DNP

Jinichiro Kozuma (born 7 July 1994) is a Japanese professional golfer. He has played primarily on the Japan Golf Tour since 2012, where he has won three times; at the 2020 Mitsui Sumitomo Visa Taiheiyo Masters, the 2022 Token Homemate Cup and the 2024 Sansan KBC Augusta.

== LIV Golf ==
In December 2023, Kozuma earned status to play in the 2024 LIV Golf League, securing a place by finishing in the top three at the LIV Golf Promotions event. He subsequently joined the Iron Heads GC.

Kozuma's time on LIV Golf came to a close at the end of the 2025 season, when he was not resigned by the newly rebranded 'Korean Golf Club'.

== Professional wins (5) ==
=== Japan Golf Tour wins (3) ===
No.	Date	Tournament	Winning score	Margin of victory	Runner-up
1	15 Nov 2020	Mitsui Sumitomo Visa Taiheiyo Masters	−8 (71-65-68-68=272)	1 stroke	(Japan) Ryosuke Kinoshita
2	3 Apr 2022	Token Homemate Cup	−14 (66-69-66-69=270)	Playoff	(Japan) Yuto Katsuragawa
3	25 Aug 2024	Sansan KBC Augusta	−19 (68-66-66-69=269)	Playoff	(Japan) Yuwa Kosaihira

Japan Golf Tour playoff record (2–0)

No.	Year	Tournament	Opponent	Result
1	2022	Token Homemate Cup	(Japan) Yuto Katsuragawa	Won with birdie on first extra hole
2	2024	Sansan KBC Augusta	(Japan) Yuwa Kosaihira	Won with par on second extra hole

=== Japan Challenge Tour wins (1) ===
No.	Date	Tournament	Winning score	Margin of victory	Runners-up
1	23 Sep 2016	Elite Grips Challenge	−13 (66-65=131)	1 stroke	(Japan) Daijiro Izumida, (Japan) Hiroyuki Nagamatsu

=== Other wins (1) ===
- 2021 Kyusyu Open

== Playoff record ==
LIV Golf League playoff record (0–1)

No.	Year	Tournament	Opponents	Result
1	2025	LIV Golf Dallas	(England) Paul Casey, (South Africa) Louis Oosthuizen, (United States) Patrick Reed	Reed won with birdie on first extra hole

== Results in major championships ==
Tournament	2022	2023	2024	2025
Masters Tournament				
PGA Championship	CUT			
U.S. Open	CUT			CUT
The Open Championship				

Did not play

CUT = missed the half-way cut
