= ISPS Handa Championship in Spain =

Professional golf tournament

Coordinates: 41.083°N 1.173°E

Tournament information
- Location: Tarragona, Spain
- Established: 2022
- Courses: Infinitum Golf (Lakes Course)
- Par: 70
- Length: 6,963 yards (6,367 m)
- Tour: European Tour
- Format: Stroke play
- Prize fund: US$2,000,000
- Month played: April
- Final year: 2022

Tournament record score
- Aggregate: 265 Pablo Larrazábal (2022)
- To par: −15 as above

Final champion
- (Spain) Pablo Larrazábal

Location map
- Location in Spain Location in Catalonia

The ISPS Handa Championship in Spain was a professional golf tournament that was held 21–24 April 2022 at Infinitum Golf in Tarragona, Spain.

The tournament was created as a one-off event after the ISPS Handa Championship in Japan was removed from the schedule in February 2022. It was played the week before the Catalunya Championship; another one-off event which was created to replace the postponed Volvo China Open.

Pablo Larrazábal won the event, shooting a final-round 62, beating Adrián Otaegui by one shot.

== Winners ==
Year	Winner	Score	To par	Margin of victory	Runner-up
2022	(Spain) Pablo Larrazábal	265	−15	1 stroke	(Spain) Adrián Otaegui
