= Matt Fitzpatrick =

English professional golfer (born 1994)

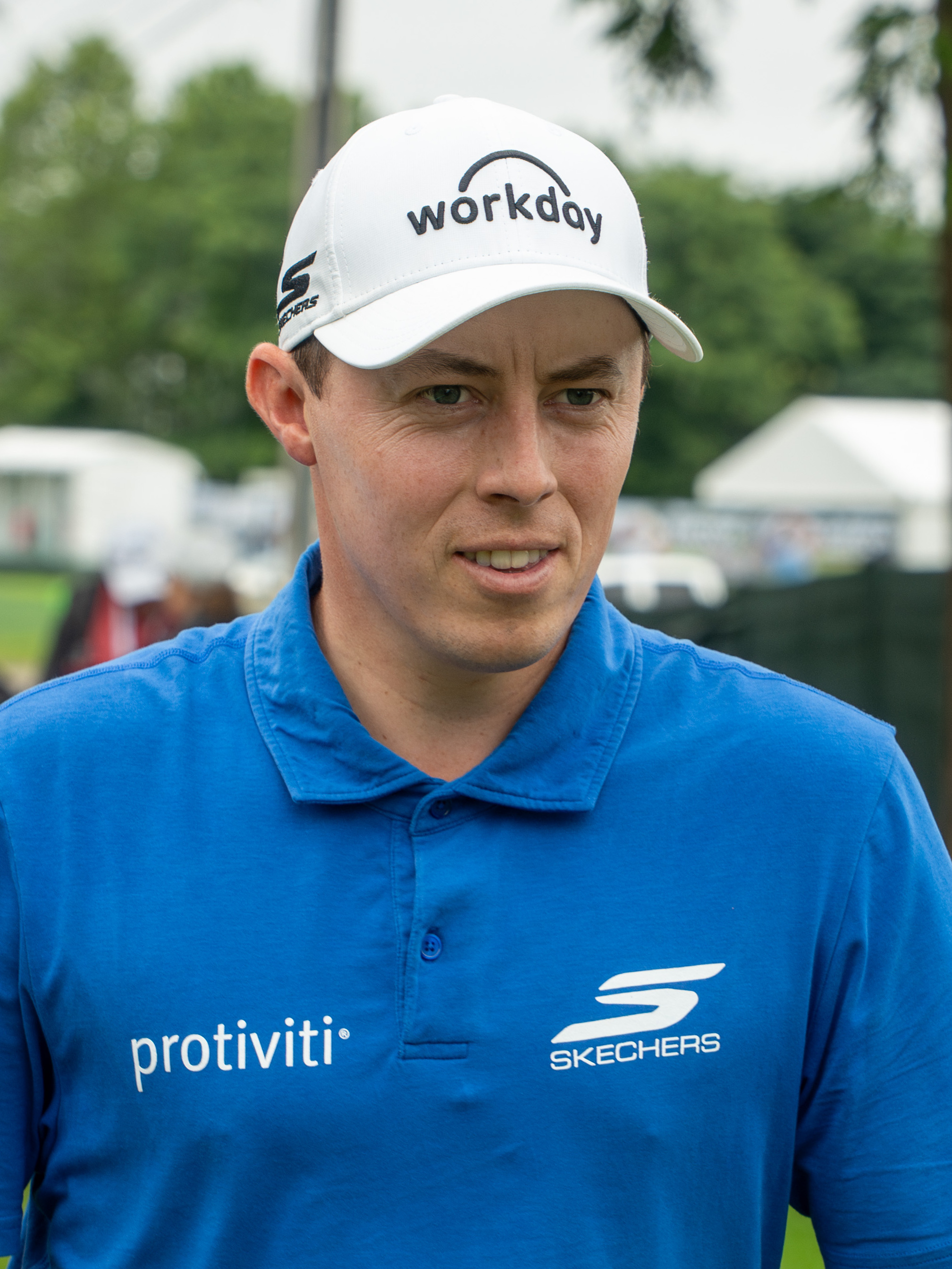
- Fitzpatrick at the 2025 Travelers Championship

Personal information
- Full name: Matthew Thomas Fitzpatrick
- Nickname: Fitzy
- Nationality: England
- Born: 1 September 1994 (age 32) Sheffield, South Yorkshire, England
- Height: 5 ft 10 in (178 cm)
- Weight: 155 lb (70 kg)

Career
- Sport: Golf
- College: Northwestern University
- Turned professional: 2014
- Current tours: European Tour; PGA Tour
- Former tour: Challenge Tour
- Professional wins: 15
- Highest ranking: 3 (19 April 2026) (as of 8 November 2026)

Number of wins by tour
- PGA Tour: 5
- European Tour: 11
- Asian Tour: 1

Best results in major championships (wins: 1)
- Masters Tournament: T7: 2016
- PGA Championship: T5: 2022
- U.S. Open: Won: 2022
- The Open Championship: T4: 2025

Achievements and awards
- Mark H. McCormack Medal: 2013

Matthew Thomas Fitzpatrick (born 1 September 1994) is an English professional golfer. After winning the 2013 U.S. Amateur, he later won his first professional tournament at the 2015 British Masters. He has five wins on the PGA Tour as of 2026, including a major championship at the 2022 US Open at The Country Club in Brookline, Massachusetts–the site of his U.S. Amateur win.

== Early life ==
Fitzpatrick was born in Sheffield and attended Tapton School where he sat A-levels in 2013. He is a keen football fan and a lifelong supporter of local club Sheffield United. His younger brother Alex played college golf at Wake Forest University in North Carolina. Alex played in the 2019 and 2021 Walker Cup and turned professional in 2022.

== Amateur career ==
Fitzpatrick won the 2012 Boys Amateur Championship at Notts Golf Club (Hollinwell). He made the cut at the 2013 Open Championship and finished as low amateur, winning The Silver Medal. Fitzpatrick and Jimmy Mullen were the only amateurs to make the cut, with Fitzpatrick finishing on 294 to Mullen's 299. Later in 2013, Fitzpatrick won the U.S. Amateur, which earned him invitations to the 2014 Masters Tournament, U.S. Open, and Open Championship provided he remained an amateur. The U.S. Amateur win took him to the top of the World Amateur Golf Ranking which earned him the Mark H. McCormack Medal. In September 2013 he played in the Walker Cup.

In September 2013 Fitzpatrick enrolled at Northwestern University to play college golf with the Northwestern Wildcats; however he left after one quarter, in January 2014, to pursue a full-time amateur golf career. He played in five tournaments for Northwestern in the autumn of 2013. He was the co-champion of the Rod Myers Invitational at Duke University to lead Northwestern to the team title, and also recorded a third place finish at the Windon Memorial Classic to help Northwestern win the tournament. He recorded finishes of 53rd, 23rd, and 15th in his other three tournaments.

== Professional career ==
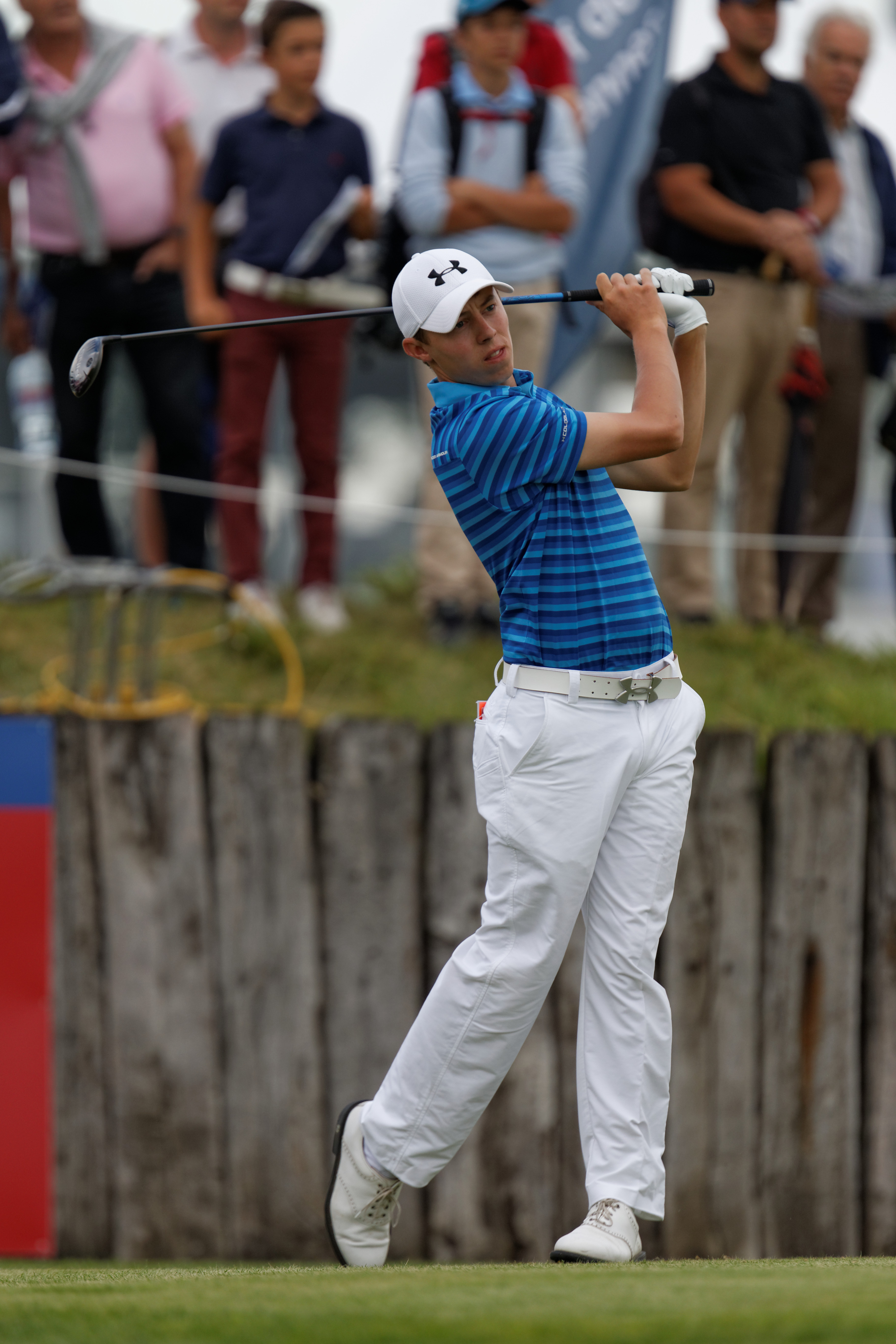
Matt Fitzpatrick in 2014

Fitzpatrick turned professional after the 2014 U.S. Open, forfeiting his exemption to the 2014 Open Championship. His professional debut was at the 2014 Irish Open, after which he played several competitions on the European Tour and Challenge Tour on sponsor and tournament invitations.

In November 2014, Fitzpatrick entered the 2014 European Tour Qualifying School where he finished in 11th place and qualified for the 2015 European Tour.

Fitzpatrick started the 2015 season missing six cuts in the first eight competitions on the season; in June, he registered a third place at the Lyoness Open quickly followed, in July 2015, by second place at the Omega European Masters a shot behind Danny Willett, winning the second prize of €300,000. His maiden victory came in October 2015, when he won the British Masters at Woburn, winning the first prize of £500,000 (€671,550). After this result, he entered the world top 100 for the first time with a ranking of 59. He finished his rookie season on tour with one win, nine top-10 placements, and a 12th place in the final Order of Merit.

In April 2016, Fitzpatrick competed at the 2016 Masters Tournament, finishing tied for the 7th place; in June, he won the 2016 Nordea Masters and reached the 32nd place in the Official World Golf Ranking, his best position to date. Due to his results on the 2015 and 2016 seasons of the European Tour he obtained an automatic selection for the 2016 Ryder Cup.

In November 2016, Fitzpatrick won the DP World Tour Championship, Dubai by one shot over Tyrrell Hatton, for the third win of his career.

In September 2017, Fitzpatrick won the Omega European Masters in Crans-Montana, Switzerland via a playoff victory over Scott Hend and in September 2018, Fitzpatrick successfully defended his European Masters title in a playoff over Lucas Bjerregaard.

In December 2020, Fitzpatrick won his second DP World Tour Championship, Dubai, beating eventual Race to Dubai champion, Lee Westwood by one shot. The win also marked his first Rolex Series title.

In September 2021, Fitzpatrick played on the European team in the 2021 Ryder Cup at Whistling Straits in Kohler, Wisconsin. The U.S. team won 19–9 and Fitzpatrick went 0–3–0 including a loss in his Sunday singles match against Daniel Berger. Three weeks later, Fitzpatrick won the Estrella Damm N.A. Andalucía Masters at Real Club Valderrama.

=== 2022: Major victory ===
In June 2022, he won his first major championship at the U.S. Open, with a one-shot victory at The Country Club in Brookline, Massachusetts – the same venue where he won the U.S. Amateur in 2013. He joined Jack Nicklaus as the second male golfer to win a U.S Open and a U.S. Amateur title at the same venue. In September, he was defeated in a playoff at the DS Automobiles Italian Open by Robert MacIntyre.

=== 2023 ===
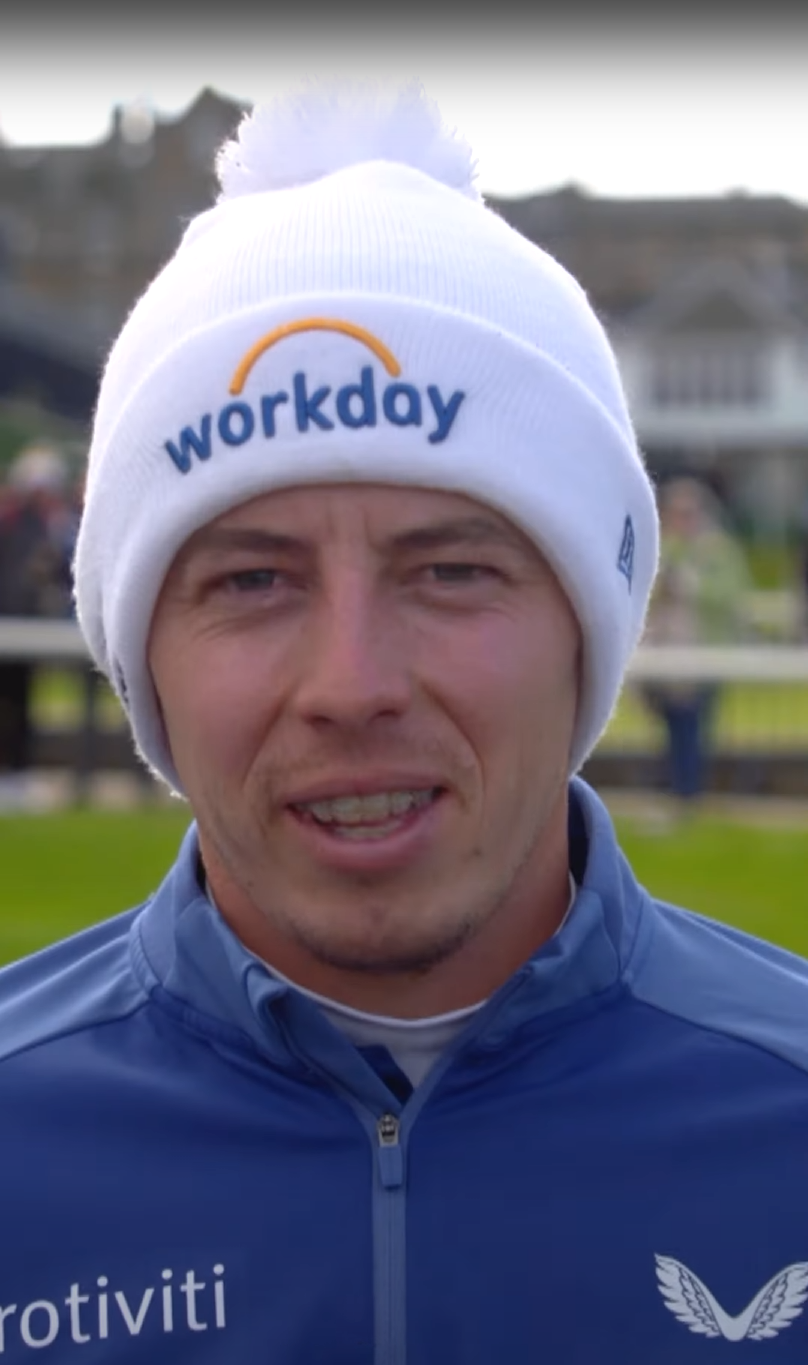
Fitzpatrick in 2023

In April 2023, Fitzpatrick won the RBC Heritage, defeating Jordan Spieth in a playoff. Fitzpatrick won on the third playoff hole after hitting his approach shot to within one foot to set up the winning birdie.

In September 2023, Fitzpatrick played on the European team in the 2023 Ryder Cup at Marco Simone Golf and Country Club in Guidonia, Rome, Italy. The European team won 16.5–11.5 and Fitzpatrick went 1–2–0 including a loss in his Sunday singles match against Max Homa.

In October 2023, Fitzpatrick won the Alfred Dunhill Links Championship with a final round 66 on the Old Course at St. Andrews. Fitpatrick also won the pro-am component of the event, his partner was his mother Susan. The event finished on Monday and was shortened to 54 holes due to inclement weather.

=== 2025 ===
In November, Fitzpatrick won his third DP World Tour Championship after defeating Rory McIlroy in a playoff.

=== 2026 ===
At the 2026 Players Championship, Fitzpatrick made a bogey on the final hole to finish runner-up, one stroke behind Cameron Young. One week later, Fitzpatrick won the Valspar Championship for his third PGA Tour victory, carding a −11 to defeat David Lipsky by one stroke. In April, Fitzpatrick won the RBC Heritage for the second time, beating Scottie Scheffler in a playoff with a birdie on the first playoff hole. One week later, Fitzpatrick, partnering with his brother Alex, won the Zurich Classic of New Orleans team event for his third victory of the PGA Tour season. In June, he finished runner-up at the Canadian Open, and fourth at the Travelers Championship. The following month, he ended in a tie for third at the Genesis Scottish Open.

In September, Fitzpatrick secured a three-shot victory at the FedEx Open de France, his fourth win of the year.

== Personal life ==
Fitzpatrick appeared in the sports documentary series Full Swing, which premiered on Netflix on 15 February 2023.

== Amateur wins ==
- 2012 Boys Amateur Championship
- 2013 U.S. Amateur

== Professional wins (15) ==
=== PGA Tour wins (5) ===
Legend
Major championships (1)
Signature events (2)
Other PGA Tour (2)

No.	Date	Tournament	Winning score	Margin of victory	Runner(s)-up
1	19 Jun 2022	U.S. Open	−6 (68-70-68-68=274)	1 stroke	(United States) Scottie Scheffler, (United States) Will Zalatoris
2	16 Apr 2023	RBC Heritage	−17 (66-70-63-68=267)	Playoff	(United States) Jordan Spieth
3	22 Mar 2026	Valspar Championship	−11 (68-69-68-68=273)	1 stroke	(United States) David Lipsky
4	19 Apr 2026	RBC Heritage (2)	−18 (65-63-68-70=266)	Playoff	(United States) Scottie Scheffler
5	26 Apr 2026	Zurich Classic of New Orleans (with (England) Alex Fitzpatrick)	−31 (64-65-57-71=258)	1 stroke	(Norway) Kristoffer Reitan and (Norway) Kristoffer Ventura, (United States) Alex Smalley and (United States) Hayden Springer

PGA Tour playoff record (2–0)

No.	Year	Tournament	Opponent	Result
1	2023	RBC Heritage	(United States) Jordan Spieth	Won with birdie on third extra hole
2	2026	RBC Heritage	(United States) Scottie Scheffler	Won with birdie on first extra hole

=== European Tour wins (11) ===
Legend
Major championships (1)
Tour C'ships/Race to Dubai finals series/Playoff events (3)
Rolex Series (2) (Note: The 2020 DP World Tour Championship, Dubai and 2025 DP World Tour Championship were also Rolex Series tournaments.)
Other European Tour (7)

No.	Date	Tournament	Winning score	Margin of victory	Runner(s)-up
1	11 Oct 2015	British Masters	−15 (64-69-68-68=269)	2 strokes	(Denmark) Søren Kjeldsen, (Republic of Ireland) Shane Lowry, (Paraguay) Fabrizio Zanotti
2	5 Jun 2016	Nordea Masters	−16 (68-65-68-71=272)	3 strokes	(Denmark) Lasse Jensen
3	20 Nov 2016	DP World Tour Championship, Dubai	−17 (69-69-66-67=271)	1 stroke	(England) Tyrrell Hatton
4	10 Sep 2017	Omega European Masters^{1}	−14 (67-65-70-64=266)	Playoff	(Australia) Scott Hend
5	9 Sep 2018	Omega European Masters (2)	−17 (69-64-63-67=263)	Playoff	(Denmark) Lucas Bjerregaard
6	13 Dec 2020	DP World Tour Championship, Dubai (2)	−15 (68-68-69-68=273)	1 stroke	(England) Lee Westwood
7	17 Oct 2021	Estrella Damm N.A. Andalucía Masters	−6 (71-68-70-69=278)	3 strokes	(Australia) Min Woo Lee, (Sweden) Sebastian Söderberg
8	19 Jun 2022	U.S. Open	−6 (68-70-68-68=274)	1 stroke	(United States) Scottie Scheffler, (United States) Will Zalatoris
9	9 Oct 2023	Alfred Dunhill Links Championship	−19 (67-64-66=197) (Note: Shortened to 54 holes due to weather.)	3 strokes	(England) Marcus Armitage, (New Zealand) Ryan Fox, (England) Matthew Southgate
10	16 Nov 2025	DP World Tour Championship (3)	−18 (69-69-66-66=270)	Playoff	(Northern Ireland) Rory McIlroy
11	27 Sep 2026	FedEx Open de France	−20 (65-64-65-70=264)	3 strokes	(Spain) Ángel Hidalgo

^{1}Co-sanctioned by the Asian Tour

European Tour playoff record (3–3)

No.	Year	Tournament	Opponent(s)	Result
1	2017	Omega European Masters	(Australia) Scott Hend	Won with par on third extra hole
2	2018	Omega European Masters	(Denmark) Lucas Bjerregaard	Won with birdie on first extra hole
3	2019	BMW International Open	(Italy) Andrea Pavan	Lost to birdie on second extra hole
4	2021	Abrdn Scottish Open	(Belgium) Thomas Detry, (Australia) Min Woo Lee	Lee won with birdie on first extra hole
5	2022	DS Automobiles Italian Open	(Scotland) Robert MacIntyre	Lost to birdie on first extra hole
6	2025	DP World Tour Championship	(Northern Ireland) Rory McIlroy	Won with par on first extra hole

== Major championships ==
=== Wins (1) ===
Year	Championship	54 holes	Winning score	Margin	Runners-up
2022	U.S. Open	Tied for lead	−6 (68-70-68-68=274)	1 stroke	(United States) Scottie Scheffler, (United States) Will Zalatoris

=== Results timeline ===
Results not in chronological order in 2020.

Tournament	2013	2014	2015	2016	2017	2018
Masters Tournament		CUT		T7	32	T38
U.S. Open		T48LA		T54	T35	T12
The Open Championship	T44LA			CUT	T44	CUT
PGA Championship				T49	CUT	CUT

Tournament	2019	2020	2021	2022	2023	2024	2025	2026
Masters Tournament	T21	T46	T34	T14	T10	T22	T40	T18
PGA Championship	T41	CUT	T23	T5	CUT	CUT	T8	T14
U.S. Open	T12	CUT	T55	1	T17	T64	T38	22
The Open Championship	T20	NT	T26	T21	T41	T50	T4	CUT

Win
Top 10
Did not play

LA = low amateur
CUT = missed the half-way cut
"T" = tied
NT = no tournament due to COVID-19 pandemic

=== Summary ===
Tournament	Wins	2nd	3rd	Top-5	Top-10	Top-25	Events	Cuts made
Masters Tournament	0	0	0	0	2	6	12	11
PGA Championship	0	0	0	1	2	4	11	6
U.S. Open	1	0	0	1	1	5	12	11
The Open Championship	0	0	0	1	1	3	11	8
Totals	1	0	0	3	6	18	46	36

- Most consecutive cuts made – 10 (2020 Masters – 2022 Masters)
- Longest streak of top-10s – 2 (2022 PGA – 2022 U.S. Open)

== Results in The Players Championship ==
Tournament	2016	2017	2018	2019	2020	2021	2022	2023	2024	2025	2026
The Players Championship	CUT	CUT	T46	T41	C	T9	CUT	CUT	5	CUT	2

Top 10

CUT = missed the halfway cut
"T" indicates a tie for a place
C = cancelled after the first round due to the COVID-19 pandemic

== Results in World Golf Championships ==
Tournament	2015	2016	2017	2018	2019	2020	2021	2022	2023
Championship		T35	T16	T30	T27	T37	T11		
Match Play		T38	T17	T36	T61	NT^{1}	T18	T18	T31
Invitational			T50	T48	T4	T6	T57		
Champions	T7	T16	T9	T54	7	NT^{1}	NT^{1}	NT^{1}	

^{1}Cancelled due to COVID-19 pandemic

Top 10
Did not play

QF, R16, R32, R64 = Round in which player lost in match play
NT = No tournament
"T" = Tied
Note that the Championship and Invitational were discontinued from 2022. The Champions was discontinued from 2023.

== Team appearances ==
Amateur

- European Boys' Team Championship (representing England): 2012
- Jacques Léglise Trophy (representing Great Britain & Ireland): 2012
- Walker Cup (representing Great Britain & Ireland): 2013

Professional

- EurAsia Cup (representing Europe): 2016 (winners), 2018 (winners)
- Ryder Cup (representing Europe) : 2016, 2021, 2023 (winners), 2025 (winners)

== See also ==
- 2014 European Tour Qualifying School graduates
- List of golfers with most European Tour wins
