= Adri Arnaus =

Spanish golfer

Personal information
- Full name: Adrià Arnaus Antúnez
- Nationality: Spain
- Born: 17 October 1994 (age 32) Barcelona, Spain

Career
- Sport: Golf
- College: Texas A&M University
- Turned professional: 2017
- Current tour: Challenge Tour
- Former tours: European Tour; Alps Tour
- Professional wins: 4
- Highest ranking: 49 (29 May 2022) (as of 25 October 2026)

Number of wins by tour
- European Tour: 1
- Challenge Tour: 1
- Other: 2

Best results in major championships
- Masters Tournament: DNP
- PGA Championship: T30: 2022
- U.S. Open: T58: 2019
- The Open Championship: T76: 2022

Achievements and awards
- Alps Tour Order of Merit winner: 2017

Adrià Arnaus Antúnez (born 17 October 1994) is a Spanish professional golfer who plays on the European Tour. He won the 2022 Catalunya Championship on the European Tour.

== Amateur career ==
Arnaus attended Texas A&M University from 2012 to 2016. He had a successful year in 2017, winning the Spanish Amateur Championship and being a member of the Spanish team that won the European Amateur Team Championship. He played on the 2017 Alps Tour as an amateur and won two events, the Villaverde Open and the Alps Tour Grand Final which together with two runner-up finishes meant he led to Order of Merit to earn a place on the Challenge Tour for 2018.

== Professional career ==
Arnaus turned professional in late 2017 and reached the final stage of the European Tour Q-School. He had a successful first year as a professional, playing mostly on the Challenge Tour. He won the end-of-season Challenge Tour Grand Final by a stroke from Victor Perez to finish second in the Order of Merit and earn a place on the 2019 European Tour. Earlier in the season he was runner-up to Jack Singh Brar in the Cordon Golf Open and also had a third-place finish and was fourth a further three times.

Arnaus claimed his first European Tour victory at the 2022 Catalunya Championship. He shot a final-round 65 to meet Oliver Bekker in a playoff. He won with a par on the sixth extra hole.

== Amateur wins ==
- 2010 Campeonato de Catalunya Junior, Spanish Under 16 Closed
- 2012 Catalonian Junior Championship
- 2013 Campeonato del Vallès
- 2014 Copa de Andalucia
- 2016 Copa de la Comunidad Valenciana, Campeonato de Catalunya Absoluto
- 2017 Campeonato de España Amateur

== Professional wins (4) ==
=== European Tour wins (1) ===
No.	Date	Tournament	Winning score	Margin of victory	Runner-up
1	1 May 2022	Catalunya Championship	−11 (68-76-68-65=277)	Playoff	(South Africa) Oliver Bekker

European Tour playoff record (1–2)

No.	Year	Tournament	Opponent(s)	Result
1	2021	Acciona Open de España	(Spain) Rafa Cabrera-Bello	Lost to birdie on first extra hole
2	2022	MyGolfLife Open	(Spain) Pablo Larrazábal, (England) Jordan Smith	Larrazábal won with birdie on second extra hole Arnaus eliminated by birdie on first hole
3	2022	Catalunya Championship	(South Africa) Oliver Bekker	Won with par on sixth extra hole

=== Challenge Tour wins (1) ===
Legend
Grand Finals (1)
Other Challenge Tour (0)

No.	Date	Tournament	Winning score	Margin of victory	Runner-up
1	3 Nov 2018	Ras Al Khaimah Challenge Tour Grand Final	−17 (66-69-67-69=271)	1 stroke	(France) Victor Perez

=== Alps Tour wins (2) ===
No.	Date	Tournament	Winning score	Margin of victory	Runner(s)-up
1	10 Jun 2017	Villaverde Open (as an amateur)	−13 (66-64-67=197)	Playoff	(France) Gregoire Schoeb
2	22 Oct 2017	Alps Tour Grand Final (as an amateur)	−14 (69-70-66-65=270)	2 strokes	(Austria) Christoph Koerbler, (France) Léo Lespinasse

== Results in major championships ==
Results not in chronological order in 2020.

Tournament	2019	2020	2021	2022	2023
Masters Tournament					
PGA Championship				T30	CUT
U.S. Open	T58			CUT	
The Open Championship	CUT	NT		T76	CUT

Did not play

CUT = missed the half-way cut
"T" = tied
NT = No tournament due to COVID-19 pandemic

== Team appearances ==
Amateur

- European Boys' Team Championship (representing Spain): 2011 (winners), 2012
- European Amateur Team Championship (representing Spain): 2015, 2017 (winners)

== See also ==
- 2018 Challenge Tour graduates
- 2025 European Tour Qualifying School graduates
