= Rikuya Hoshino =

Japanese professional golfer (born 1996)

Personal information
- Nationality: Japan
- Born: 12 May 1996 (age 30) Ibaraki Prefecture, Japan
- Height: 1.86 m (6 ft 1 in)
- Weight: 76 kg (168 lb; 12.0 st)

Career
- Sport: Golf
- Turned professional: 2016
- Current tours: PGA Tour; European Tour; Japan Golf Tour
- Former tours: Asian Tour; Japan Challenge Tour
- Professional wins: 8
- Highest ranking: 63 (22 May 2022) (as of 25 October 2026)

Number of wins by tour
- European Tour: 1
- Japan Golf Tour: 6
- Other: 1

Best results in major championships
- Masters Tournament: DNP
- PGA Championship: T60: 2022
- U.S. Open: T26: 2021
- The Open Championship: T60: 2023

Achievements and awards
- Japan Golf Tour Rookie of the Year: 2018

Rikuya Hoshino (星野陸也, Hoshino Rikuya; born 12 May 1996) is a Japanese professional golfer who plays on the European Tour, where he claimed his first win in 2024 at the Commercial Bank Qatar Masters. He has also played on the Japan Golf Tour since 2017 and has won six times on the tour.

== Professional career ==
Hoshino turned professional in August 2016. In early 2017, he won the Novil Cup on the Japan Challenge Tour.

Since 2017, Hoshino has played on the main Japan Golf Tour. His first win came in September 2018 at the Fujisankei Classic which he won by 5 strokes. With eight more top-10 finishes he finished 2018 as the 6th highest money winner on the tour. Hoshino qualified for the 2018 U.S. Open, his first major, where he missed the cut.

In May 2019, Hoshino lost in a playoff for the Kansai Open Golf Championship before winning his second Japan Golf Tour event at the Dunlop Srixon Fukushima Open in June, a tournament reduced to 54 holes. A third-place finish in the Japan PGA Championship the following week lifted him into the top-100 of the Official World Golf Ranking. Later in 2019, he finished runner-up in the RIZAP KBC Augusta.

Hoshino won the Fujisankei Classic for the second time in 2020, beating Mikumu Horikawa at the third hole of a sudden-death playoff.

In February 2024, Hoshino claimed his first victory on the European Tour at the Commercial Bank Qatar Masters.

== Professional wins (8) ==
=== European Tour wins (1) ===
No.	Date	Tournament	Winning score	Margin of victory	Runner-up
1	11 Feb 2024	Commercial Bank Qatar Masters	−14 (69-68-69-68=274)	1 stroke	(France) Ugo Coussaud

European Tour playoff record (0–1)

No.	Year	Tournament	Opponent	Result
1	2023	ISPS Handa Australian Open	(Chile) Joaquín Niemann	Lost to eagle on second extra hole

=== Japan Golf Tour wins (6) ===
No.	Date	Tournament	Winning score	Margin of victory	Runner(s)-up
1	2 Sep 2018	Fujisankei Classic	−16 (68-68-66-66=268)	5 strokes	(Japan) Shugo Imahira
2	30 Jun 2019	Dunlop Srixon Fukushima Open	−20 (67-64-65=196) (Note: Shortened to 54 holes due to weather.)	2 strokes	(Japan) Shota Akiyoshi
3	6 Sep 2020	Fujisankei Classic (2)	−9 (69-69-67-70=275)	Playoff	(Japan) Mikumu Horikawa
4	25 Apr 2021	Kansai Open Golf Championship	−14 (66-67-68-69=270)	2 strokes	(United States) Chan Kim
5	16 May 2021	Asia-Pacific Diamond Cup Golf	−13 (72-65-69-69=275)	4 strokes	(Philippines) Juvic Pagunsan
6	30 Oct 2022	Heiwa PGM Championship	−22 (63-68-64-63=258)	5 strokes	(Japan) Aguri Iwasaki, (United States) Chan Kim

Japan Golf Tour playoff record (1–2)

No.	Year	Tournament	Opponent	Result
1	2019	Kansai Open Golf Championship	(Japan) Tomoharu Otsuki	Lost to birdie on fourth extra hole
2	2020	Fujisankei Classic	(Japan) Mikumu Horikawa	Won with birdie on third extra hole
3	2022	Mitsui Sumitomo Visa Taiheiyo Masters	(Japan) Ryo Ishikawa	Lost to birdie on second extra hole

=== Japan Challenge Tour wins (1) ===
No.	Date	Tournament	Winning score	Margin of victory	Runners-up
1	2 Apr 2017	Novil Cup	−11 (71-68-66=205)	1 stroke	(Japan) Kunihiro Kamii, (Japan) Katsuyuki Sakurai

== Results in major championships ==
Results not in chronological order before 2019 and in 2020.

Tournament	2018	2019	2020	2021	2022	2023	2024	2025
Masters Tournament								
PGA Championship				CUT	T60	T62		
U.S. Open	CUT			T26	CUT		CUT	
The Open Championship			NT	CUT	CUT	T60	CUT	CUT

Did not play

CUT = missed the halfway cut
"T" = tied
NT = no tournament due to COVID-19 pandemic

== See also ==
- 2024 Race to Dubai dual card winners
