= 2024 PGA Championship =

Tournament information
- Dates: May 16–19, 2024
- Location: Louisville, Kentucky, U.S. 38°14′17″N 85°28′14″W
- Course: Valhalla Golf Club
- Tours: PGA Tour; European Tour; Japan Golf Tour

Statistics
- Par: 71
- Length: 7,609 yards (6,958 m)
- Field: 156 players, 78 after cut
- Cut: 141 (−1)
- Prize fund: $18,500,000
- Winner's share: $3,330,000

Champion
- (United States) Xander Schauffele
- 263 (−21)
- Location in the United States Location in Kentucky

The 2024 PGA Championship was the 106th edition of the PGA Championship and the second of the men's four major golf championships held in 2024. It was won by Xander Schauffele. The tournament was played from May 16–19 at Valhalla Golf Club in Louisville, Kentucky, United States.

== Venue ==
This is the fourth PGA Championship at Valhalla, which previously hosted in 1996, 2000, and 2014. It also hosted the Ryder Cup in 2008.

Hole	Name	Yards	Par	Hole	Name	Yards	Par
1	The Post	484	4	10	Big Red	590	5
2	Winning Colors	500	4	11	Holler	211	3
3	Honest Abe	208	3	12	Sting Like a Bee	494	4
4	Mine that Bird	372	4	13	The Limestone Hole	351	4
5	The Sun Shines Bright	463	4	14	On the Rocks	254	3
6	Long Shot	495	4	15	Julep	435	4
7	Genuine Risk	597	5	16	Homestretch	508	4
8	Float Like a Butterfly	190	3	17	Straight Up	472	4
9	Twin Spires	415	4	18	Photo Finish	570	5
Out		3,724	35	In		3,885	36
Source:				Total		7,609	71

Previous course lengths for major championships

- 7,458 yards (6,820 m) – par 71, 2014 PGA Championship
- 7,167 yards (6,554 m) – par 72, 2000 PGA Championship
- 7,144 yards (6,532 m) – par 72, 1996 PGA Championship

== Field ==
=== Criteria ===
This list details the qualification criteria for the 2024 PGA Championship and the players who qualified under them; any additional criteria under which players qualified are indicated in parentheses.

1. All past winners of the PGA Championship

- Rich Beem
- Keegan Bradley (10,12)
- John Daly
- Jason Day (10)
- Jason Dufner
- Pádraig Harrington
- Martin Kaymer
- Brooks Koepka (8,11)
- Rory McIlroy (8,10,11,12)
- Shaun Micheel
- Phil Mickelson
- Collin Morikawa (4,10,11,12)
- Justin Thomas (10,11)
- Jimmy Walker
- Tiger Woods
- Yang Yong-eun
- Paul Azinger, Mark Brooks, Steve Elkington, Raymond Floyd, Al Geiberger, Wayne Grady, David Graham, Davis Love III, John Mahaffey, Larry Nelson, Bobby Nichols, Jack Nicklaus, Gary Player, Nick Price, Vijay Singh, Jeff Sluman, Dave Stockton, Hal Sutton, David Toms, Lee Trevino, Bob Tway, and Lanny Wadkins were not in the initially released field.

2. Recent winners of the Masters Tournament (2020–2024)

- Dustin Johnson
- Hideki Matsuyama (10,12)
- Jon Rahm (3,11)
- Scottie Scheffler (5,8,10,11,12)

3. Recent winners of the U.S. Open (2019–2023)

- Wyndham Clark (10,11,12)
- Bryson DeChambeau (8)
- Matt Fitzpatrick (10,11)
- Gary Woodland

4. Recent winners of The Open Championship (2018–2023)

- Brian Harman (10,11,12)
- Shane Lowry (8,10,11)
- Francesco Molinari
- Cameron Smith (5,8)

5. Recent winners of The Players Championship (2022–2024)

6. The top three on the Official World Golf Ranking's International Federation Ranking List as of April 29, 2024

- Keita Nakajima (13)
- Andy Ogletree
- Ryan van Velzen

7. Current Senior PGA Champion

- Steve Stricker was listed in the first published field but did not play.

8. The leading 15 players, and those tying for 15th place, in the 2023 PGA Championship

- Michael Block
- Patrick Cantlay (10,11)
- Eric Cole (10)
- Corey Conners (10)
- Cameron Davis (10)
- Tyrrell Hatton (11)
- Viktor Hovland (10,11,12)
- Kurt Kitayama (10)
- Victor Perez
- Justin Rose (11)
- Sepp Straka (10,11,12)

9. The leading 20 players in the 2024 PGA Professional Championship

- Josh Bevell
- Evan Bowser
- Preston Cole
- Tyler Collet
- Matt Dobyns
- Larkin Gross
- Jared Jones
- Jeff Kellen
- Brad Marek
- Kyle Mendoza
- Jesse Mueller
- Zac Oakley
- Tracy Phillips
- Ben Polland
- Braden Shattuck
- John Somers
- Josh Speight
- Andrew Svoboda
- Jeremy Wells
- Wyatt Worthington II

10. Top 70 players who are eligible and have earned the most PGA Championship Points from the 2023 AT&T Byron Nelson through the 2024 CJ Cup Byron Nelson

- Ludvig Åberg (11,12)
- An Byeong-hun
- Christiaan Bezuidenhout
- Akshay Bhatia (12)
- Zac Blair
- Sam Burns (11)
- Thomas Detry
- Austin Eckroat (12)
- Harris English
- Tony Finau
- Tommy Fleetwood (11)
- Rickie Fowler (11,12)
- Lucas Glover (12)
- Emiliano Grillo (12)
- Adam Hadwin
- Russell Henley
- Lee Hodges (12)
- Tom Hoge
- Max Homa (11)
- Beau Hossler
- Mark Hubbard
- Mackenzie Hughes
- Im Sung-jae
- Stephan Jäger (12)
- Kim Si-woo
- Tom Kim (12)
- Chris Kirk (12)
- Jake Knapp (12)
- Min Woo Lee
- Luke List (12)
- Peter Malnati (12)
- Denny McCarthy
- Taylor Moore
- Grayson Murray (12)
- Alex Norén
- Matthieu Pavon (12)
- Taylor Pendrith (12)
- J. T. Poston
- Andrew Putnam
- Aaron Rai
- Patrick Rodgers
- Xander Schauffele (11)
- Adam Schenk
- Adam Scott
- Jordan Spieth (11)
- Adam Svensson
- Nick Taylor (12)
- Sahith Theegala (12)
- Brendon Todd
- Erik van Rooyen (12)
- Cameron Young
- Will Zalatoris

11. Playing members of the 2023 Ryder Cup teams, who are ranked within the top 100 on the Official World Golf Ranking as of May 6, 2024

- Nicolai Højgaard
- Robert MacIntyre

12. Winners of official tournaments on the PGA Tour from the 2023 PGA Championship until the start of the championship

- Nick Dunlap
- Brice Garnett
- Chris Gotterup
- Billy Horschel
- Vincent Norrman
- Camilo Villegas

13. Top 3 finishers on the DP World Tour Asian Swing event rankings (Note: The DP World Tour Asian Swing consisted of four tournaments: the Porsche Singapore Classic, the Hero Indian Open, the ISPS Handa Championship and the Volvo China Open.)

- Adrián Otaegui
- Sebastian Söderberg

14. PGA of America invitees (Note: The PGA of America usually invites all players ranked inside the top 100 of the Official World Golf Ranking. Eleven players with a world ranking of over 100 on May 6, 2024, were given invitations; eight of these had rankings between 101 and 130, while Donald was ranked 420, Kobori 432, and Gooch 644.)

- Alexander Björk
- Dean Burmester
- Luke Donald
- Ryan Fox
- Talor Gooch
- Ben Griffin
- Lucas Herbert
- Ryo Hisatsune
- Charley Hoffman
- Rasmus Højgaard
- Takumi Kanaya
- Kazuma Kobori
- Ben Kohles
- Thriston Lawrence
- Lee Kyoung-hoon
- Adrian Meronk
- Keith Mitchell
- Maverick McNealy
- Joaquín Niemann
- Thorbjørn Olesen
- David Puig
- Patrick Reed
- Jordan Smith
- Jesper Svensson
- Alejandro Tosti
- Sami Välimäki
- Matt Wallace
- Tim Widing
- Louis Oosthuizen declined an invitation.
- Rikuya Hoshino and Taylor Montgomery were listed in the first published field but did not play.

15. If necessary, the field is completed by players in order of PGA Championship points earned (per 10)

- Doug Ghim (72) (Note: Doug Ghim replaced Rikuya Hoshino.)
- Alex Smalley (75) (Note: Alex Smalley replaced Steve Stricker.)
- Kim Seong-hyeon (78) (Note: Kim Seong-hyeon took the place reserved for the winner of the Wells Fargo Championship.)
- Pan Cheng-tsung (80) (Note: Pan Cheng-tsung replaced Taylor Montgomery.)

== Round summaries ==
=== First round ===
Thursday, May 16, 2024

Xander Schauffele took the first-round lead with a 62, tying the record for lowest round at a major championship and breaking the course record of 63, set by José María Olazábal in the 2000 PGA Championship. Schauffele also became the first player to shoot 62 multiple times in majors, having previously done so in the first round of the 2023 U.S. Open.

Place	Player	Score	To par
1	(United States) Xander Schauffele	62	−9
T2	(United States) Tony Finau	65	−6
T2	(United States) Mark Hubbard	65	−6
T2	(United States) Sahith Theegala	65	−6
T5	(Belgium) Thomas Detry	66	−5
T5	(United States) Tom Hoge	66	−5
T5	(South Korea) Tom Kim	66	−5
T5	(Scotland) Robert MacIntyre	66	−5
T5	(Northern Ireland) Rory McIlroy	66	−5
T5	(United States) Maverick McNealy	66	−5
T5	(United States) Collin Morikawa	66	−5

=== Second round ===
Friday, May 17, 2024
Saturday, May 18, 2024

Tee times were delayed due to a fatal traffic accident near Valhalla Golf Club, which led to a police response in the area and created difficulty for players entering the club. World number one Scottie Scheffler was arrested following an incident with a police officer while attempting to enter the venue and taken to a nearby jail; he was charged and released in time to make his delayed 10:08 am tee time.

Play was suspended at 8:42 pm Eastern Time due to darkness, with 18 players remaining on the course. The cut came at 141 (one under par), as soft and calm conditions produced low scoring for the field. Notables to miss the cut included numbers four, five and six in the Official World Golf Ranking: Wyndham Clark, Jon Rahm, and Ludvig Åberg, and four-time PGA champion Tiger Woods. Also missing the cut was PGA Professional Michael Block, who finished T15 in 2023, while Jeremy Wells and Braden Shattuck made the cut. The one under par cut number is the lowest in PGA Championship history, and it shares the lowest in major championship history with both the 1990 and 2006 Open Championships.

Place	Player	Score	To par
1	(United States) Xander Schauffele	62-68=130	−12
2	(United States) Collin Morikawa	66-65=131	−11
3	(United States) Sahith Theegala	65-67=132	−10
T4	(United States) Bryson DeChambeau	68-65=133	−9
T4	(Belgium) Thomas Detry	66-67=133	−9
T4	(United States) Mark Hubbard	65-68=133	−9
T4	(United States) Scottie Scheffler	67-66=133	−9
T8	(South Africa) Dean Burmester	69-65=134	−8
T8	(United States) Austin Eckroat	67-67=134	−8
T8	(United States) Tony Finau	65-69=134	−8
T8	(Norway) Viktor Hovland	68-66=134	−8

=== Third round ===
Saturday, May 18, 2024

Starting eight strokes off the lead, Shane Lowry shot a bogey-free 62 to move into contention. This tied the record for lowest round in a major championship. Xander Schauffele maintained his lead, although it was now a co-lead alongside 2020 champion Collin Morikawa.

Place	Player	Score	To par
T1	(United States) Collin Morikawa	66-65-67=198	−15
T1	(United States) Xander Schauffele	62-68-68=198	−15
3	(United States) Sahith Theegala	65-67-67=199	−14
T4	(United States) Bryson DeChambeau	68-65-67=200	−13
T4	(Norway) Viktor Hovland	68-66-66=200	−13
T4	(Republic of Ireland) Shane Lowry	69-69-62=200	−13
T7	(Scotland) Robert MacIntyre	66-69-66=201	−12
T7	(England) Justin Rose	70-67-64=201	−12
9	(South Africa) Dean Burmester	69-65-68=202	−11
T10	(Belgium) Thomas Detry	66-67-70=203	−10
T10	(United States) Austin Eckroat	67-67-69=203	−10
T10	(United States) Harris English	68-67-68=203	−10
T10	(United States) Tony Finau	65-69-69=203	−10
T10	(United States) Lee Hodges	71-65-67=203	−10
T10	(United States) Justin Thomas	69-67-67=203	−10

=== Final round ===
Sunday, May 19, 2024

==== Summary ====
Xander Schauffele birdied the final hole to shoot 65 and win the PGA Championship by one stroke over Bryson DeChambeau. Schauffele led the tournament wire-to-wire to win the first major championship of his career, and his winning total of 21-under broke the major championship scoring record. Braden Shattuck earned the Crystal Ball as the low PGA Professional.

==== Final leaderboard ====
Champion
Crystal Bowl winner (leading PGA Club Pro)
(c) = past champion

Top 10
Place	Player	Score	To par	Money (US$)
1	(United States) Xander Schauffele	62-68-68-65=263	−21	3,330,000
2	(United States) Bryson DeChambeau	68-65-67-64=264	−20	1,998,000
3	(Norway) Viktor Hovland	68-66-66-66=266	−18	1,258,000
T4	(Belgium) Thomas Detry	66-67-70-66=269	−15	814,000
T4	(United States) Collin Morikawa (c)	66-65-67-71=269	−15	814,000
T6	(Republic of Ireland) Shane Lowry	69-69-62-70=270	−14	639,440
T6	(England) Justin Rose	70-67-64-69=270	−14	639,440
T8	(United States) Billy Horschel	69-69-69-64=271	−13	521,418
T8	(Scotland) Robert MacIntyre	66-69-66-70=271	−13	521,418
T8	(United States) Scottie Scheffler	67-66-73-65=271	−13	521,418
T8	(United States) Justin Thomas (c)	69-67-67-68=271	−13	521,418

Leaderboard below the top 10
Place	Player	Score	To par	Money ($)
T12	(South Africa) Dean Burmester	69-65-68-70=272	−12	359,943
T12	(United States) Lee Hodges	71-65-67-69=272	−12	359,943
T12	(Northern Ireland) Rory McIlroy (c)	66-71-68-67=272	−12	359,943
T12	(United States) Taylor Moore	67-68-69-68=272	−12	359,943
T12	(Sweden) Alex Norén	67-70-70-65=272	−12	359,943
T12	(United States) Sahith Theegala	65-67-67-73=272	−12	359,943
T18	(United States) Keegan Bradley (c)	69-67-68-69=273	−11	230,764
T18	(United States) Austin Eckroat	67-67-69-70=273	−11	230,764
T18	(United States) Harris English	68-67-68-70=273	−11	230,764
T18	(United States) Tony Finau	65-69-69-70=273	−11	230,764
T18	(Japan) Ryo Hisatsune	71-68-67-67=273	−11	230,764
T23	(United States) Russell Henley	70-69-66-69=274	−10	170,137
T23	(United States) Tom Hoge	66-73-68-67=274	−10	170,137
T23	(United States) Maverick McNealy	66-72-69-67=274	−10	170,137
T26	(Canada) Corey Conners	70-71-67-67=275	−9	113,962
T26	(England) Tommy Fleetwood	72-69-69-65=275	−9	113,962
T26	(United States) Brian Harman	72-68-68-67=275	−9	113,962
T26	(United States) Mark Hubbard	65-68-73-69=275	−9	113,962
T26	(South Korea) Tom Kim	66-71-68-70=275	−9	113,962
T26	(United States) Kurt Kitayama	68-70-70-67=275	−9	113,962
T26	(United States) Brooks Koepka (c)	67-68-74-66=275	−9	113,962
T26	(United States) Ben Kohles	67-73-67-68=275	−9	113,962
T26	(Australia) Min Woo Lee	72-66-70-67=275	−9	113,962
T35	(United States) Brice Garnett	72-67-69-68=276	−8	79,183
T35	(United States) Doug Ghim	69-68-70-69=276	−8	79,183
T35	(United States) Max Homa	68-70-69-69=276	−8	79,183
T35	(Japan) Hideki Matsuyama	70-65-70-71=276	−8	79,183
T39	(Sweden) Alexander Björk	71-67-71-68=277	−7	66,848
T39	(Chile) Joaquín Niemann	73-68-69-67=277	−7	66,848
T39	(England) Aaron Rai	68-68-70-71=277	−7	66,848
T39	(England) Jordan Smith	70-71-72-64=277	−7	66,848
T43	(South Korea) An Byeong-hun	71-67-72-68=278	−6	48,969
T43	(Australia) Jason Day (c)	71-67-69-71=278	−6	48,969
T43	(United States) Lucas Glover	71-68-70-69=278	−6	48,969
T43	(Australia) Lucas Herbert	69-67-68-74=278	−6	48,969
T43	(United States) Dustin Johnson	73-68-71-66=278	−6	48,969
T43	(United States) Grayson Murray	72-68-71-67=278	−6	48,969
T43	(United States) Jordan Spieth	69-69-67-73=278	−6	48,969
T43	(Canada) Adam Svensson	70-69-70-69=278	−6	48,969
T43	(England) Matt Wallace	70-65-71-72=278	−6	48,969
T43	(United States) Will Zalatoris	71-68-69-70=278	−6	48,969
T53	(United States) Zac Blair	73-66-68-72=279	−5	32,587
T53	(United States) Patrick Cantlay	70-68-73-68=279	−5	32,587
T53	(Denmark) Thorbjørn Olesen	69-71-69-70=279	−5	32,587
T53	(United States) Andrew Putnam	68-72-72-67=279	−5	32,587
T53	(United States) Patrick Reed	69-70-71-69=279	−5	32,587
T53	(Sweden) Jesper Svensson	68-71-72-68=279	−5	32,587
T53	(South Africa) Erik van Rooyen	72-68-71-68=279	−5	32,587
T60	(United States) Talor Gooch	71-70-70-69=280	−4	27,017
T60	(Canada) Adam Hadwin	68-72-71-69=280	−4	27,017
T60	(United States) Gary Woodland	71-69-71-69=280	−4	27,017
T63	(United States) Rickie Fowler	72-69-69-71=281	−3	25,202
T63	(England) Tyrrell Hatton	71-69-68-73=281	−3	25,202
T63	(South Korea) Kim Seong-hyeon	69-72-71-69=281	−3	25,202
T63	(Australia) Cameron Smith	68-70-70-73=281	−3	25,202
T63	(United States) Cameron Young	69-71-70-71=281	−3	25,202
T68	(England) Luke Donald	70-69-72-71=282	−2	23,538
T68	(Denmark) Nicolai Højgaard	70-71-68-73=282	−2	23,538
T68	(Denmark) Rasmus Højgaard	68-72-73-69=282	−2	23,538
T68	(Sweden) Sebastian Söderberg	73-67-74-68=282	−2	23,538
72	(United States) Braden Shattuck	71-70-68-74=283	−1	22,830
T73	(Germany) Martin Kaymer (c)	68-72-68-76=284	E	22,560
T73	(Argentina) Alejandro Tosti	68-69-79-68=284	E	22,560
75	(New Zealand) Ryan Fox	72-68-72-74=286	+2	22,350
76	(Germany) Stephan Jäger	70-71-70-78=289	+5	22,230
77	(United States) Jeremy Wells	69-71-75-75=290	+6	22,140
78	(United States) Brendon Todd	70-70-74-79=293	+9	22,100
CUT	(Sweden) Ludvig Åberg	72-70=142	E	
CUT	(South Africa) Christiaan Bezuidenhout	74-68=142	E	
CUT	(United States) Eric Cole	71-71=142	E	
CUT	(England) Matt Fitzpatrick	69-73=142	E	
CUT	(United States) Peter Malnati	72-70=142	E	
CUT	(United States) Kyle Mendoza	72-70=142	E	
CUT	(United States) Keith Mitchell	71-71=142	E	
CUT	(United States) Jesse Mueller	70-72=142	E	
CUT	(Spain) Adrián Otaegui	70-72=142	E	
CUT	(Taiwan) Pan Cheng-tsung	73-69=142	E	
CUT	(United States) Ben Polland	73-69=142	E	
CUT	(Spain) Jon Rahm	70-72=142	E	
CUT	(Finland) Sami Välimäki	70-72=142	E	
CUT	(United States) Akshay Bhatia	73-70=143	+1	
CUT	(United States) Jason Dufner (c)	68-75=143	+1	
CUT	(United States) Charley Hoffman	71-72=143	+1	
CUT	(Poland) Adrian Meronk	74-69=143	+1	
CUT	(Canada) Taylor Pendrith	72-71=143	+1	
CUT	(United States) Adam Schenk	71-72=143	+1	
CUT	(Canada) Nick Taylor	72-71=143	+1	
CUT	(Sweden) Tim Widing	70-73=143	+1	
CUT	(Argentina) Emiliano Grillo	71-73=144	+2	
CUT	(United States) Beau Hossler	72-72=144	+2	
CUT	(Canada) Mackenzie Hughes	74-70=144	+2	
CUT	(Japan) Takumi Kanaya	75-69=144	+2	
CUT	(United States) Jake Knapp	75-69=144	+2	
CUT	(Sweden) Vincent Norrman	72-72=144	+2	
CUT	(Austria) Sepp Straka	71-73=144	+2	
CUT	(United States) Andrew Svoboda	74-70=144	+2	
CUT	(United States) Evan Bowser	72-73=145	+3	
CUT	(United States) Sam Burns	72-73=145	+3	
CUT	(United States) Tyler Collet	73-72=145	+3	
CUT	(United States) Chris Gotterup	74-71=145	+3	
CUT	(South Korea) Im Sung-jae	73-72=145	+3	
CUT	(Spain) David Puig	72-73=145	+3	
CUT	(Australia) Adam Scott	72-73=145	+3	
CUT	(United States) Wyndham Clark	71-75=146	+4	
CUT	(United States) Luke List	69-77=146	+4	
CUT	(United States) Denny McCarthy	73-73=146	+4	
CUT	(United States) Phil Mickelson (c)	74-72=146	+4	
CUT	(Italy) Francesco Molinari	71-75=146	+4	
CUT	(Japan) Keita Nakajima	71-75=146	+4	
CUT	(United States) Patrick Rodgers	70-76=146	+4	
CUT	(South Africa) Ryan van Velzen	75-71=146	+4	
CUT	(United States) Nick Dunlap	74-73=147	+5	
CUT	(South Korea) Kim Si-woo	73-74=147	+5	
CUT	(United States) Chris Kirk	73-74=147	+5	
CUT	(United States) J. T. Poston	72-75=147	+5	
CUT	(United States) Alex Smalley	74-73=147	+5	
CUT	(United States) Wyatt Worthington II	72-75=147	+5	
CUT	(South Korea) Yang Yong-eun (c)	74-73=147	+5	
CUT	(United States) Andy Ogletree	73-75=148	+6	
CUT	(United States) John Somers	76-72=148	+6	
CUT	(United States) Jimmy Walker (c)	72-76=148	+6	
CUT	(United States) Michael Block	76-73=149	+7	
CUT	(Australia) Cameron Davis	78-71=149	+7	
CUT	(United States) Tiger Woods (c)	72-77=149	+7	
CUT	(United States) Jared Jones	73-77=150	+8	
CUT	(New Zealand) Kazuma Kobori	73-77=150	+8	
CUT	(France) Victor Perez	79-71=150	+8	
CUT	(United States) Brad Marek	73-78=151	+9	
CUT	(Republic of Ireland) Pádraig Harrington (c)	77-75=152	+10	
CUT	(United States) Shaun Micheel (c)	76-76=152	+10	
CUT	(United States) Zac Oakley	77-75=152	+10	
CUT	(United States) Josh Speight	74-78=152	+10	
CUT	(United States) Josh Bevell	73-80=153	+11	
CUT	(South Africa) Thriston Lawrence	75-78=153	+11	
CUT	(France) Matthieu Pavon	76-77=153	+11	
CUT	(Colombia) Camilo Villegas	79-74=153	+11	
CUT	(United States) Tracy Phillips	75-80=155	+13	
CUT	(United States) Matt Dobyns	76-80=156	+14	
CUT	(United States) Larkin Gross	79-77=156	+14	
CUT	(United States) Preston Cole	75-83=158	+16	
CUT	(United States) Jeff Kellen	87-72=159	+17	
CUT	(United States) Rich Beem (c)	79-83=162	+20	
WD	(United States) Ben Griffin	73	+2	
WD	(South Korea) Lee Kyoung-hoon	74	+3	
WD	(United States) John Daly (c)	82	+11	

==== Scorecard ====
Final round

Hole	1	2	3	4	5	6	7	8	9	10	11	12	13	14	15	16	17	18
Par	4	4	3	4	4	4	5	3	4	5	3	4	4	3	4	4	4	5
(United States) Schauffele	–16	–16	–16	–17	–17	–17	–18	–18	–19	–18	–19	–20	–20	–20	–20	–20	–20	–21
(United States) DeChambeau	–13	–14	–14	–14	–15	–16	–16	–16	–16	–17	–17	–17	–18	–18	–18	–19	–19	–20
(Norway) Hovland	–13	–13	–13	–13	–14	–15	–16	–16	–16	–17	–17	–18	–19	–19	–19	–19	–19	–18
(Belgium) Detry	–10	–10	–10	–10	–10	–10	–11	–12	–12	–12	–12	–13	–13	–13	–13	–14	–14	–15
(United States) Morikawa	–15	–15	–15	–15	–15	–15	–15	–15	–15	–15	–15	–15	–15	–15	–14	–14	–14	–15
(Republic of Ireland) Lowry	–13	–13	–14	–15	–15	–15	–15	–14	–14	–14	–14	–14	–14	–15	–15	–14	–14	–14
(England) Rose	–12	–12	–12	–13	–13	–12	–12	–12	–13	–14	–15	–15	–16	–16	–16	–16	–15	–14

Cumulative tournament scores, relative to par

Birdie	Bogey
