= 2023 PGA Championship =

Golf tournament

Tournament information
- Dates: May 18–21, 2023
- Location: Pittsford, New York; 43°06′45″N 77°32′06″W
- Courses: Oak Hill Country Club; East Course
- Organized by: PGA of America
- Tours: PGA Tour; European Tour; Japan Golf Tour

Statistics
- Par: 70
- Length: 7,394 yards (6,761 m)
- Field: 156, 76 after cut
- Cut: 145 (+5)
- Prize fund: $17,500,000
- Winner's share: $3,150,000

Champion
- (United States) Brooks Koepka
- 271 (−9)
- Location in the United States Location in New York

The 2023 PGA Championship was the 105th PGA Championship. It was a 72-hole stroke play tournament played on May 18–21 on the East Course of Oak Hill Country Club in Pittsford, New York.

Brooks Koepka finished at nine under for the tournament to win his third career PGA Championship and fifth major championship by two shots over Viktor Hovland and Scottie Scheffler. Koepka joined Jack Nicklaus and Tiger Woods as the only players to win three PGA titles in the stroke-play era and became the 20th player to win five majors. Koepka was the first to win a major title as a member of LIV Golf.

== Venue ==
Oak Hill Country Club previously hosted six major championships, the last being the 2013 PGA Championship. The course underwent a significant renovation beginning in 2019, including the removal of several trees and rebuild of the greens with bentgrass. The old par-3 sixth hole was removed and the fifth, sixth, and 15th holes were completely redesigned.

=== Course layout ===
Hole	1	2	3	4	5	6	7	8	9	Out	10	11	12	13	14	15	16	17	18	In	Total
Yards	460	405	230	615	180	503	461	429	482	3,765	430	245	399	623	320	155	458	502	497	3,629	7,394
Par	4	4	3	5	3	4	4	4	4	35	4	3	4	5	4	3	4	4	4	35	70

Yardage by round

Round	Hole	1	2	3	4	5	6	7	8	9	Out	10	11	12	13	14	15	16	17	18	In	Total
1st	Yards	457	410	209	617	185	498	462	439	481	3,758	423	248	413	617	317	163	466	490	492	3,629	7,387
2nd	Yards	464	387	201	622	165	503	457	423	478	3,703	423	248	390	623	317	131	447	493	502	3,574	7,277
3rd	Yards	466	404	206	622	182	505	455	420	485	3,745	434	175	407	617	300	141	448	506	480	3,508	7,253
Final	Yards	465	385	212	614	164	481	472	442	464	3,699	437	246	389	612	320	151	464	507	497	3,623	7,322
Par		4	4	3	5	3	4	4	4	4	35	4	3	4	5	4	3	4	4	4	35	70

Previous course lengths for major championships

- 7,163 yards (6,550 m) – par 70, 2013 PGA Championship
- 7,134 yards (6,523 m) – par 70, 2003 PGA Championship
- 6,902 yards (6,311 m) – par 70, 1989 U.S. Open
- 6,964 yards (6,368 m) – par 70, 1980 PGA Championship
- 6,962 yards (6,366 m) – par 70, 1968 U.S. Open
- 6,902 yards (6,311 m) – par 70, 1956 U.S. Open

== Field ==
=== Criteria ===
This list details the qualification criteria for the 2023 PGA Championship and the players who qualified under them; any additional criteria under which players qualified are indicated in parentheses.

1. All past winners of the PGA Championship

- Keegan Bradley (10,12)
- Jason Day (10,12)
- Pádraig Harrington
- Brooks Koepka (3)
- Rory McIlroy (8,10,12)
- Shaun Micheel
- Phil Mickelson
- Collin Morikawa (4,10)
- Justin Thomas (5,8,10)
- Jimmy Walker
- Yang Yong-eun
- John Daly, Jason Dufner, Martin Kaymer, Davis Love III and Vijay Singh withdrew after the initial field release.
- Paul Azinger, Rich Beem, Mark Brooks, Jack Burke Jr., Steve Elkington, Raymond Floyd, Al Geiberger, Wayne Grady, David Graham, John Mahaffey, Larry Nelson, Bobby Nichols, Jack Nicklaus, Gary Player, Nick Price, Jeff Sluman, Dave Stockton, Hal Sutton, David Toms, Lee Trevino, Bob Tway, Lanny Wadkins and Tiger Woods (2) (Note: Tiger Woods underwent ankle surgery following the Masters Tournament in April.) were not in the initially released field.

2. Recent winners of the Masters Tournament (2019–2023)

- Dustin Johnson
- Hideki Matsuyama (10)
- Jon Rahm (3,10,12)
- Scottie Scheffler (5,10,12)

3. Recent winners of the U.S. Open (2018–2022)

- Bryson DeChambeau
- Matt Fitzpatrick (8,10,12)
- Gary Woodland (10)

4. Recent winners of The Open Championship (2017–2022)

- Shane Lowry (10)
- Francesco Molinari
- Cameron Smith (5,8)
- Jordan Spieth (10)

5. Recent winners of The Players Championship (2021–2023)

6. The top three on the Official World Golf Ranking's International Federation Ranking List as of April 24, 2023.

- Kazuki Higa
- Sihwan Kim
- Ockie Strydom

7. Current Senior PGA Champion

- Steven Alker

8. The leading 15 players, and those tying for 15th place, in the 2022 PGA Championship

- Abraham Ancer
- Tommy Fleetwood (10)
- Tyrrell Hatton (10)
- Lucas Herbert
- Tom Hoge (10)
- Max Homa (10,12)
- Chris Kirk (10,12)
- Mito Pereira
- Séamus Power (10,12)
- Davis Riley (10,12)
- Justin Rose (10,12)
- Xander Schauffele (10,12)
- Brendan Steele
- Cameron Young (10)
- Will Zalatoris (10,12) was not in the field. (Note: Will Zalatoris underwent season-ending back surgery in April.)

9. The leading 20 players in the 2023 PGA Professional Championship

- Alex Beach
- Michael Block
- Matt Cahill
- Anthony Cordes
- Jesse Droemer
- Chris French
- Russell Grove
- Steve Holmes
- Colin Inglis
- Ben Kern
- J. J. Killeen
- Greg Koch
- Kenny Pigman
- Gabe Reynolds
- Chris Sanger
- Braden Shattuck
- John Somers
- Josh Speight
- Jeremy Wells
- Wyatt Worthington II

10. Top 70 eligible players from special money list on the PGA Tour from the 2022 AT&T Byron Nelson to the 2023 Wells Fargo Championship

- Christiaan Bezuidenhout
- Hayden Buckley
- Sam Burns (12)
- Patrick Cantlay (12)
- Wyndham Clark (12)
- Corey Conners (12)
- Cameron Davis
- Harris English
- Tony Finau (12)
- Rickie Fowler
- Emiliano Grillo
- Adam Hadwin
- Nick Hardy (12)
- Brian Harman
- Russell Henley (12)
- Billy Horschel (12)
- Viktor Hovland
- Mark Hubbard
- Mackenzie Hughes (12)
- Im Sung-jae
- Kim Si-woo (12)
- Tom Kim (12)
- Kurt Kitayama (12)
- Matt Kuchar
- Lee Kyoung-hoon
- Denny McCarthy
- Keith Mitchell
- Taylor Montgomery
- Taylor Moore (12)
- Trey Mullinax (12)
- Taylor Pendrith
- J. T. Poston (12)
- Andrew Putnam
- Chez Reavie (12)
- Patrick Rodgers
- Sam Ryder
- Adam Schenk
- Adam Scott
- J. J. Spaun
- Scott Stallings
- Sepp Straka
- Adam Svensson (12)
- Nick Taylor
- Sahith Theegala
- Brendon Todd
- Aaron Wise
- Brandon Wu

11. Playing members of the 2021 Ryder Cup teams, who are ranked within the top 100 on the Official World Golf Ranking as of May 7, 2023 (Note: Daniel Berger, Paul Casey, Sergio García, Ian Poulter, Lee Westwood, Bernd Wiesberger were ranked outside the top-100 of the OWGR on May 7, 2023; of them, only Casey was given a special invitation (category 13).)

12. Winners of official tournaments on the PGA Tour from the 2022 PGA Championship until the start of the championship

- Nico Echavarría
- Matt Wallace

13. PGA of America invitees (Note: The PGA of America usually invites all players ranked inside the top 100 of the Official World Golf Ranking. Eleven players with a world ranking of over 100 on May 7, 2023, were given invitations; eight of these had rankings between 101 and 150, while Johnson was ranked 253, Micheluzzi 361 and Donald 457.)

- Adri Arnaus
- Dean Burmester
- Joel Dahmen
- Luke Donald
- Ryan Fox
- Talor Gooch
- Ben Griffin
- Nicolai Højgaard
- Rasmus Højgaard
- Rikuya Hoshino
- Zach Johnson
- Sadom Kaewkanjana
- Kevin Kisner
- Anirban Lahiri
- Pablo Larrazábal
- Thriston Lawrence
- Min Woo Lee
- Robert MacIntyre
- Maverick McNealy
- Adrian Meronk
- David Micheluzzi
- Joaquín Niemann
- Alex Norén
- Thorbjørn Olesen
- Adrián Otaegui
- Yannik Paul
- Victor Perez
- Thomas Pieters
- Patrick Reed
- Callum Shinkwin
- Webb Simpson
- Jordan Smith
- Justin Suh
- Ben Taylor
- Davis Thompson
- Harold Varner III
- Paul Casey withdrew.

14. If necessary, the field is completed by players in order of PGA Championship points earned (per 10)

- Thomas Detry
- Beau Hossler
- Matthew NeSmith
- Danny Willett

Alternates who gained entry

- Alex Smalley (78) (Note: Alex Smalley replaced Davis Love III.)
- Lee Hodges (82) (Note: Lee Hodges replaced Vijay Singh.)
- David Lingmerth (83) (Note: David Lingmerth and Callum Tarren replaced Jason Dufner and Martin Kaymer.)
- Callum Tarren (85)
- Eric Cole (86) (Note: Eric Cole took the place reserved for the winner of the AT&T Byron Nelson.)
- Stephan Jäger (88) (Note: Stephan Jäger replaced John Daly.)
- Sam Stevens (90) (Note: Sam Stevens replaced Paul Casey.)

== Round summaries ==
=== First round ===
Thursday, May 18, 2023
Friday, May 19, 2023

A frost delay caused tee times to be delayed on Thursday by almost 2 hours, ultimately resulting in play being suspended at 8:50 pm EDT due to darkness. 10 groups did not finish their rounds due to the suspension of play. Play resumed at 7:00 am EST on Friday.

Bryson DeChambeau made three birdies over his final nine holes to shoot 66 (−4) and move atop the leaderboard at the end of the first round.

Eric Cole, making his PGA Championship debut after getting into the field as an alternate, made three straight birdies on holes 2–4 and was alone in first place at five under when play was halted. He double-bogeyed the sixth hole (his 15th) on Friday morning to drop back to three under and a shot behind DeChambeau. Scottie Scheffler did not make a bogey in a round of 67 to join Cole in a tie for second place, along with Dustin Johnson who was tied with DeChambeau until a bogey on the 18th. Adam Scott also got to four under until a double bogey on the 18th dropped back to two under and a four-way tie for sixth place that included 2011 champion Keegan Bradley.

Defending champion Justin Thomas made a double bogey on the sixth hole and shot two-over 72 in his opening round. World No. 1 Jon Rahm made six bogeys, including on his final three holes, and a double bogey as he began the tournament with a six-over 76.

Place	Player	Score	To par
1	(United States) Bryson DeChambeau	66	−4
T2	(United States) Eric Cole	67	−3
T2	(Canada) Corey Conners	67	−3
T2	(United States) Dustin Johnson	67	−3
T2	(United States) Scottie Scheffler	67	−3
T6	(United States) Keegan Bradley	68	−2
T6	(New Zealand) Ryan Fox	68	−2
T6	(Norway) Viktor Hovland	68	−2
T6	(Australia) Adam Scott	68	−2
T10	(United States) Hayden Buckley	69	−1
T10	(Spain) Pablo Larrazábal	69	−1
T10	(United States) Keith Mitchell	69	−1
T10	(Belgium) Thomas Pieters	69	−1
T10	(England) Justin Rose	69	−1
T10	(Austria) Sepp Straka	69	−1
T10	(United States) Justin Suh	69	−1

=== Second round ===
Friday, May 19, 2023

Corey Conners, Viktor Hovland, and Scottie Scheffler tied for the lead through 36 holes at five under. Scheffler, one back at the start of the round, birdied the first hole after hitting his approach to within two feet. He bogeyed the seventh hole, his first bogey of the tournament, before hitting his tee shot on the par-three 15th hole to a foot for a birdie and a share of the lead with Conners. A closing bogey dropped Scheffler back to five under after a two-under round of 68.

Conners was three under on his round and alone in first place at six under before a bogey at the seventh hole (his 16th) to match Scheffler's 68. Hovland birdied his first two holes, including holing a 20-foot putt on the second, then made another 18-footer for birdie at the 10th. At the 18th, Hovland hit his approach to five feet and made the putt for a closing birdie and a 67 (−3). It was Hovland's 10th consecutive major championship round inside the top 10 on the leaderboard.

First-round leader Bryson DeChambeau double-bogeyed the sixth hole after hitting his approach shot into a greenside bunker and fell as many as five shots off the lead before making three birdies on the back nine to get back to four under. He found another bunker on the 18th and made bogey to fall to three under, two shots back of the lead. Justin Suh joined him in a tie for fourth place after making a 33-foot birdie putt on the eighth hole, his 17th.

Two-time champion Brooks Koepka made five birdies on his closing nine holes, including both the 17th and 18th, to shoot a four-under 66 and climb into a tie for sixth place at two under. Michael Block, a club pro in California, was three under on his round before a bogey at the par-5 fourth hole and double bogey on the par-3 fifth after his tee shot struck a tree. He finished at even par and tied for 10th place, the first PGA professional to be inside the top 10 after the second round since 1988.

The cut came at 145 (+5), with 76 players making it to the weekend. Defending champion Justin Thomas needed a seven-foot putt to save bogey on the 18th hole and make the cut on the number, as did two-time champion Phil Mickelson. Notables to miss the cut included 2015 champion Jason Day and reigning U.S. Open champion Matt Fitzpatrick.

Place	Player	Score	To par
T1	(Canada) Corey Conners	67-68=135	−5
T1	(Norway) Viktor Hovland	68-67=135	−5
T1	(United States) Scottie Scheffler	67-68=135	−5
T4	(United States) Bryson DeChambeau	66-71=137	−3
T4	(United States) Justin Suh	69-68=137	−3
T6	(United States) Brooks Koepka	72-66=138	−2
T6	(England) Callum Tarren	71-67=138	−2
T8	(Canada) Taylor Pendrith	70-69=139	−1
T8	(England) Justin Rose	69-70=139	−1
T10	(United States) Michael Block	70-70=140	E
T10	(United States) Keegan Bradley	68-72=140	E
T10	(Australia) Min Woo Lee	73-67=140	E
T10	(Republic of Ireland) Shane Lowry	73-67=140	E
T10	(Northern Ireland) Rory McIlroy	71-69=140	E
T10	(United States) Keith Mitchell	69-71=140	E
T10	(United States) Matthew NeSmith	70-70=140	E
T10	(Austria) Sepp Straka	69-71=140	E
T10	(Canada) Adam Svensson	70-70=140	E

=== Third round ===
Saturday, May 20, 2023

Two-time champion Brooks Koepka shot a second consecutive round of 66 (−4) to take the 54-hole lead. Koepka made three birdies on the back nine, including a 46-foot putt on the 17th to reach six under for the tournament and a shot ahead of Corey Conners and Viktor Hovland.

Conners, part of a three-way tie for the lead at the start of the round, reached seven under after a birdie at the par-3 15th hole. At the 16th, he drove into a bunker off the tee then had his second shot embed in the bank, leading to a double bogey that dropped him back to five under and an even-par round of 70. Hovland was two-over on his round before making three birdies in a five-hole span from 8–12. He holed an 18-footer for birdie at the 11th, then hit his approach on the 12th to four feet and made the putt to tie Conners for the lead at six under. He failed to get up-and-down from a greenside bunker on the 18th for a closing bogey, matching Conners' 70.

Bryson DeChambeau double-bogeyed the sixth hole after finding water off the tee and also bogeyed the par-5 13th to fall to two-over on his round. He rebounded with birdie on the short par-4 14th after driving near the green, then hit his approach on the 15th to seven feet for another birdie to shoot 70 and finish alone in fourth place at three under, three shots off the lead. Scottie Scheffler, tied with Conners and Hovland for the lead at the start of the round, made four bogeys on his front nine and did not make his first birdie until the 14th as he fell back with a three-over 73, ending up in a tie for fifth place at two under.

Club pro Michael Block shot even-par 70 for the third consecutive round and was tied for eighth place, becoming the first PGA professional to be inside the top 10 after the third round since Jay Overton in 1988.

Place	Player	Score	To par
1	(United States) Brooks Koepka	72-66-66=204	−6
T2	(Canada) Corey Conners	67-68-70=205	−5
T2	(Norway) Viktor Hovland	68-67-70=205	−5
4	(United States) Bryson DeChambeau	66-71-70=207	−3
T5	(England) Justin Rose	69-70-69=208	−2
T5	(United States) Scottie Scheffler	67-68-73=208	−2
7	(Northern Ireland) Rory McIlroy	71-69-69=209	−1
T8	(United States) Michael Block	70-70-70=210	E
T8	(United States) Justin Suh	69-68-73=210	E
T10	(United States) Eric Cole	67-74-70=211	+1
T10	(England) Tommy Fleetwood	72-71-68=211	+1
T10	(Germany) Stephan Jäger	72-70-69=211	+1
T10	(Australia) Min Woo Lee	73-67-71=211	+1
T10	(Republic of Ireland) Shane Lowry	73-67-71=211	+1
T10	(France) Victor Perez	70-72-69=211	+1

=== Final round ===
Sunday, May 21, 2023

==== Summary ====
Brooks Koepka shot a final-round 67 to win his third PGA Championship and fifth major championship by two shots over Viktor Hovland and Scottie Scheffler.

Beginning the round with a one-stroke lead, Koepka made three straight birdies to increase the gap to three shots after four holes. He hit his tee shot on the sixth hole into the hazard and made his first bogey of the round, then made another bogey on the seventh when his approach shot hung in the rough around a greenside bunker. Koepka rebounded with birdies on the 10th and 12th, holing a 10-foot putt from just off the green, to offset another bogey on the par-3 11th after his tee shot plugged in a bunker.

Hovland, meanwhile, made two birdies on the front nine including a 17-foot putt on the par-3 fifth hole as he stayed within one shot of Koepka's lead making the turn. He also birdied the 13th and 14th to go three under on his round and was still a shot behind Koepka heading to the 16th. He hit his tee shot into a fairway bunker, then had his second shot embed in the bank forcing him to take a drop and settle for a double bogey. Koepka birdied the hole after hitting his approach inside five feet as he opened up a four-shot lead with just two holes to play. Despite a bogey on the 17th, Koepka was able to two-putt for par on the 18th to finish at nine under.

Scottie Scheffler made four birdies on the back nine and got within two shots of Koepka's lead as he shot a five-under 65, tying the lowest round of any player in the tournament, to tie Hovland for second place. Scheffler's finish coupled with Jon Rahm's T50 finish returned Scheffler to world number one. Corey Conners, who began the round a shot off the lead, made seven bogeys in a five-over 75 to fall into a tie for 12th place. Club pro Michael Block made a hole-in-one on the 15th hole and shot 71 (+1); his tie for 15th place was the best finish by a PGA professional since 1986 and qualified him for the following year's PGA Championship.

==== Final leaderboard ====
Champion
Crystal Bowl winner (leading PGA Club Pro)
(c) = past champion

Top 10
Place	Player	Score	To par	Money (US$)
1	(United States) Brooks Koepka (c)	72-66-66-67=271	−9	3,150,000
T2	(Norway) Viktor Hovland	68-67-70-68=273	−7	1,540,000
T2	(United States) Scottie Scheffler	67-68-73-65=273	−7	1,540,000
T4	(Australia) Cameron Davis	71-70-71-65=277	−3	720,000
T4	(United States) Bryson DeChambeau	66-71-70-70=277	−3	720,000
T4	(United States) Kurt Kitayama	70-71-71-65=277	−3	720,000
T7	(Northern Ireland) Rory McIlroy (c)	71-69-69-69=278	−2	555,000
T7	(Austria) Sepp Straka	69-71-73-65=278	−2	555,000
T9	(United States) Patrick Cantlay	74-67-72-66=279	−1	465,000
T9	(England) Justin Rose	69-70-69-71=279	−1	465,000
T9	(Australia) Cameron Smith	72-72-70-65=279	−1	465,000

Leaderboard below the top 10
Place	Player	Score	To par	Money ($)
T12	(Canada) Corey Conners	67-68-70-75=280	E	365,000
T12	(Republic of Ireland) Shane Lowry	73-67-71-69=280	E	365,000
T12	(France) Victor Perez	70-72-69-69=280	E	365,000
T15	(United States) Michael Block	70-70-70-71=281	+1	288,333
T15	(United States) Eric Cole	67-74-70-70=281	+1	288,333
T15	(England) Tyrrell Hatton	77-68-69-67=281	+1	288,333
T18	(England) Tommy Fleetwood	72-71-68-71=282	+2	214,400
T18	(Australia) Min Woo Lee	73-67-71-71=282	+2	214,400
T18	(Chile) Mito Pereira	72-69-74-67=282	+2	214,400
T18	(United States) Patrick Reed	72-71-69-70=282	+2	214,400
T18	(United States) Xander Schauffele	72-72-71-67=282	+2	214,400
T23	(New Zealand) Ryan Fox	68-73-71-71=283	+3	165,000
T23	(United States) Matthew NeSmith	70-70-74-69=283	+3	165,000
T23	(United States) Alex Smalley	73-72-70-68=283	+3	165,000
T26	(United States) Hayden Buckley	69-74-71-70=284	+4	135,000
T26	(United States) Collin Morikawa (c)	71-70-74-69=284	+4	135,000
T26	(United States) Justin Suh	69-68-73-74=284	+4	135,000
T29	(United States) Keegan Bradley (c)	68-72-74-71=285	+5	90,136
T29	(United States) Chris Kirk	70-75-69-71=285	+5	90,136
T29	(South Korea) Lee Kyoung-hoon	73-68-75-69=285	+5	90,136
T29	(Japan) Hideki Matsuyama	72-71-70-72=285	+5	90,136
T29	(United States) Denny McCarthy	75-70-72-68=285	+5	90,136
T29	(Canada) Taylor Pendrith	70-69-74-72=285	+5	90,136
T29	(United States) Patrick Rodgers	70-75-72-68=285	+5	90,136
T29	(Australia) Adam Scott	68-74-74-69=285	+5	90,136
T29	(United States) Jordan Spieth	73-72-71-69=285	+5	90,136
T29	(England) Callum Tarren	71-67-79-68=285	+5	90,136
T29	(United States) Harold Varner III	70-71-74-70=285	+5	90,136
T40	(Belgium) Thomas Detry	74-71-73-68=286	+6	46,900
T40	(Canada) Adam Hadwin	70-73-73-70=286	+6	46,900
T40	(Australia) Lucas Herbert	75-69-72-70=286	+6	46,900
T40	(United States) Beau Hossler	71-70-74-71=286	+6	46,900
T40	(Poland) Adrian Meronk	75-69-74-68=286	+6	46,900
T40	(Belgium) Thomas Pieters	69-76-70-71=286	+6	46,900
T40	(United States) J. T. Poston	72-70-75-69=286	+6	46,900
T40	(United States) Chez Reavie	76-68-71-71=286	+6	46,900
T40	(Canada) Adam Svensson	70-70-73-73=286	+6	46,900
T40	(United States) Sahith Theegala	71-71-71-73=286	+6	46,900
T50	(Republic of Ireland) Pádraig Harrington (c)	72-71-75-69=287	+7	37,625
T50	(Denmark) Nicolai Højgaard	76-67-73-71=287	+7	37,625
T50	(Germany) Stephan Jäger	72-70-69-76=287	+7	37,625
T50	(Spain) Jon Rahm	76-68-72-71=287	+7	37,625
54	(South Africa) Dean Burmester	73-71-72-72=288	+8	36,000
T55	(United States) Lee Hodges	75-70-75-69=289	+9	35,000
T55	(United States) Max Homa	71-72-74-72=289	+9	35,000
T55	(United States) Dustin Johnson	67-74-74-74=289	+9	35,000
T58	(United States) Tom Hoge	74-70-72-74=290	+10	33,250
T58	(United States) Zach Johnson	74-71-74-71=290	+10	33,250
T58	(United States) Phil Mickelson (c)	73-72-75-70=290	+10	33,250
T58	(United States) Keith Mitchell	69-71-73-77=290	+10	33,250
T62	(Japan) Rikuya Hoshino	75-70-75-71=291	+11	31,500
T62	(United States) Sihwan Kim	75-68-75-73=291	+11	31,500
T62	(South Africa) Thriston Lawrence	75-69-73-74=291	+11	31,500
T65	(Spain) Pablo Larrazábal	69-75-74-74=292	+12	29,750
T65	(United States) Taylor Montgomery	75-70-76-71=292	+12	29,750
T65	(United States) Justin Thomas (c)	72-73-75-72=292	+12	29,750
T65	(England) Matt Wallace	73-70-75-74=292	+12	29,750
T69	(United States) Joel Dahmen	74-69-78-72=293	+13	28,000
T69	(Germany) Yannik Paul	76-69-73-75=293	+13	28,000
T69	(England) Ben Taylor	72-72-78-71=293	+13	28,000
T72	(United States) Tony Finau	72-73-73-77=295	+15	26,500
T72	(United States) Taylor Moore	74-69-78-74=295	+15	26,500
T72	(United States) Sam Stevens	71-72-73-79=295	+15	26,500
75	(United States) Mark Hubbard	71-74-79-74=298	+18	25,500
76	(Japan) Kazuki Higa	72-73-77-78=300	+20	25,000
CUT	(Spain) Adri Arnaus	76-70=146	+6	
CUT	(South Africa) Christiaan Bezuidenhout	73-73=146	+6	
CUT	(England) Matt Fitzpatrick	76-70=146	+6	
CUT	(United States) Rickie Fowler	73-73=146	+6	
CUT	(United States) Brian Harman	72-74=146	+6	
CUT	(United States) Billy Horschel	71-75=146	+6	
CUT	(South Korea) Kim Si-woo	73-73=146	+6	
CUT	(United States) Andrew Putnam	74-72=146	+6	
CUT	(England) Jordan Smith	73-73=146	+6	
CUT	(United States) Brendan Steele	72-74=146	+6	
CUT	(United States) Davis Thompson	77-69=146	+6	
CUT	(England) Luke Donald	72-75=147	+7	
CUT	(United States) Ben Griffin	75-72=147	+7	
CUT	(United States) Russell Henley	73-74=147	+7	
CUT	(United States) Matt Kuchar	74-73=147	+7	
CUT	(India) Anirban Lahiri	74-73=147	+7	
CUT	(Italy) Francesco Molinari	74-73=147	+7	
CUT	(Sweden) Alex Norén	74-73=147	+7	
CUT	(United States) Davis Riley	72-75=147	+7	
CUT	(Canada) Nick Taylor	71-76=147	+7	
CUT	(United States) Brendon Todd	76-71=147	+7	
CUT	(United States) Wyndham Clark	77-71=148	+8	
CUT	(Australia) Jason Day (c)	76-72=148	+8	
CUT	(Canada) Mackenzie Hughes	74-74=148	+8	
CUT	(United States) Colin Inglis	77-71=148	+8	
CUT	(South Korea) Tom Kim	73-75=148	+8	
CUT	(United States) Trey Mullinax	77-71=148	+8	
CUT	(Chile) Joaquín Niemann	74-74=148	+8	
CUT	(Spain) Adrián Otaegui	75-73=148	+8	
CUT	(England) Callum Shinkwin	74-74=148	+8	
CUT	(United States) Scott Stallings	74-74=148	+8	
CUT	(United States) Gary Woodland	73-75=148	+8	
CUT	(Colombia) Nico Echavarría	75-74=149	+9	
CUT	(United States) Harris English	74-75=149	+9	
CUT	(Argentina) Emiliano Grillo	78-71=149	+9	
CUT	(United States) Nick Hardy	76-73=149	+9	
CUT	(Denmark) Rasmus Højgaard	75-74=149	+9	
CUT	(Australia) David Micheluzzi	76-73=149	+9	
CUT	(Republic of Ireland) Séamus Power	75-74=149	+9	
CUT	(United States) J. J. Spaun	74-75=149	+9	
CUT	(United States) Jimmy Walker (c)	73-76=149	+9	
CUT	(United States) Brandon Wu	74-75=149	+9	
CUT	(United States) Cameron Young	74-75=149	+9	
CUT	(United States) Matt Cahill	78-72=150	+10	
CUT	(United States) Talor Gooch	76-74=150	+10	
CUT	(Mexico) Abraham Ancer	76-75=151	+11	
CUT	(United States) Maverick McNealy	78-73=151	+11	
CUT	(Denmark) Thorbjørn Olesen	74-77=151	+11	
CUT	(England) Danny Willett	74-77=151	+11	
CUT	(South Korea) Yang Yong-eun (c)	76-75=151	+11	
CUT	(Australia) Steven Alker	80-72=152	+12	
CUT	(United States) Steve Holmes	76-76=152	+12	
CUT	(Thailand) Sadom Kaewkanjana	76-76=152	+12	
CUT	(United States) Greg Koch	78-74=152	+12	
CUT	(Scotland) Robert MacIntyre	76-76=152	+12	
CUT	(United States) Sam Ryder	78-74=152	+12	
CUT	(United States) Braden Shattuck	79-73=152	+12	
CUT	(United States) Jeremy Wells	74-78=152	+12	
CUT	(South Korea) Im Sung-jae	80-73=153	+13	
CUT	(United States) Ben Kern	76-77=153	+13	
CUT	(United States) J. J. Killeen	73-80=153	+13	
CUT	(United States) Kevin Kisner	75-78=153	+13	
CUT	(Sweden) David Lingmerth	76-77=153	+13	
CUT	(United States) Adam Schenk	74-79=153	+13	
CUT	(South Africa) Ockie Strydom	77-76=153	+13	
CUT	(United States) Sam Burns	74-80=154	+14	
CUT	(United States) Webb Simpson	77-77=154	+14	
CUT	(United States) Aaron Wise	75-79=154	+14	
CUT	(United States) Chris French	78-77=155	+15	
CUT	(United States) Jesse Droemer	77-79=156	+16	
CUT	(United States) John Somers	76-80=156	+16	
CUT	(United States) Alex Beach	80-77=157	+17	
CUT	(United States) Anthony Cordes	79-78=157	+17	
CUT	(United States) Josh Speight	75-82=157	+17	
CUT	(United States) Wyatt Worthington II	75-82=157	+17	
CUT	(United States) Russell Grove	79-79=158	+18	
CUT	(United States) Kenny Pigman	81-78=159	+19	
CUT	(United States) Gabe Reynolds	85-75=160	+20	
CUT	(United States) Shaun Micheel (c)	81-82=163	+23	
CUT	(United States) Chris Sanger	84-81=165	+25	

==== Scorecard ====
Hole	1	2	3	4	5	6	7	8	9	10	11	12	13	14	15	16	17	18
Par	4	4	3	5	3	4	4	4	4	4	3	4	5	4	3	4	4	4
(United States) Koepka	−6	−7	−8	−9	−9	−8	−7	−7	−7	−8	−7	−8	−8	−9	−9	−10	−9	−9
(Norway) Hovland	−5	−5	−5	−6	−7	−7	−6	−6	−6	−6	−6	−6	−7	−8	−8	−6	−6	−7
(United States) Scheffler	−2	−2	−2	−2	−2	−2	−3	−4	−3	−4	−4	−4	−5	−6	−6	−6	−6	−7
(Australia) Davis	+3	+3	+3	+3	+2	+2	+2	+1	E	E	E	E	E	−2	−2	−2	−3	−3
(United States) DeChambeau	−3	−3	−3	−3	−4	−4	−3	−4	−4	−3	−3	−2	−2	−3	−3	−3	−3	−3
(United States) Kitayama	+1	+1	+1	E	−1	E	E	−1	−1	−1	−1	−2	−3	−3	−3	−3	−3	−3
(Northern Ireland) McIlroy	−2	−1	−1	E	E	−1	E	E	−1	−2	−2	−2	−3	−3	−2	−2	−2	−2
(Austria) Straka	+2	+1	+1	+1	E	+1	+1	E	+1	E	E	E	−1	−2	−3	−3	−3	−2
(England) Rose	−3	−3	−3	−3	−3	−4	−3	−3	−3	−2	−1	−1	−1	−1	−2	−1	−1	−1
(Canada) Conners	−5	−5	−4	−5	−4	−4	−3	−3	−3	−3	−3	−2	−1	−2	−2	−2	−1	E
(United States) Block	+1	+1	+1	+1	+1	+1	+2	+2	+2	+2	+2	+2	+2	+2	E	+1	+1	+1

Cumulative tournament scores, relative to par

Eagle	Birdie	Bogey	Double Bogey
