= Michael Block =

American golfer and club professional (born 1976)

Personal information
- Nickname: Blockie
- Nationality: United States
- Born: June 15, 1976 (age 50) Reno, Nevada, U.S.
- Height: 6 ft 2 in (188 cm)
- Weight: 210 lb (95 kg)
- Spouse: Val
- Children: 2

Career
- Sport: Golf
- College: Mississippi State University; University of Missouri–St. Louis
- Status: Professional
- Professional wins: 7

Best results in major championships
- Masters Tournament: DNP
- PGA Championship: T15: 2023
- U.S. Open: CUT: 2007, 2018
- The Open Championship: DNP

Achievements and awards
- PGA Professional Player of the Year: 2022, 2023
- Southern California PGA Player of the Year: 2013, 2014, 2015, 2016, 2018, 2019, 2020, 2021, 2022, 2023

Michael Block (born June 15, 1976) is an American professional golfer. Having spent most of his career working as a club professional (Note: Most professional golfers earn money by holding positions at golf clubs where they give lessons, sell equipment, and occasionally compete in tournaments; these are known as club professionals. By contrast, touring professionals aim to make money by succeeding in competitive golf tournaments, such as those on the PGA Tour.) in Southern California, he received attention after making the cut and finishing in the top 15 at the 2023 PGA Championship at the age of 46. After making the only hole in one of the tournament during his final round, Block finished in a tie for 15th place, which was the highest finish for a club professional in decades, earning him an automatic invitation to the following year's competition.

== Biography ==
Block was born on June 15, 1976, in Reno, Nevada, growing up first in Davenport, Iowa, and then the St. Louis area of Missouri. During his adolescence, he played golf in Bellerive at the Bellerive Country Club 2 miles (3.2 km) from his home, before graduating from Parkway Central High School in Chesterfield, Missouri, in 1994. He attended Mississippi State University and the University of Missouri–St. Louis, playing college golf at both, before receiving a degree in golf course management from the San Diego Golf Academy.

Block was the assistant club professional at The Lakes Country Club in Palm Desert, California, from 1998 until 2004, before becoming head club professional at Arroyo Trabuco Golf Club in Mission Viejo, California. He competed in the 2007 PGA Tour Q-School, but did not pass the second stage. Prior to the 2023 PGA Championship, Block played in 25 PGA Tour events, making the cut in four of them, while winning the Southern California PGA Player of the Year award nine out of ten years from 2012 to 2022. Although he had qualified for four PGA Championships (2014, 2016, 2018, and 2022) and two U.S. Opens (2007 and 2018), he had never made the cut, with a lowest 36-hole score of eight over par. Block's career includes wins at the 2001 California State Open, four Southern California PGA Championships (2017, 2018, 2022, 2023), and the 2014 PGA Professional National Championship. He also played in the 2015 and 2022 PGA Cups for the USA team, winning the latter.

He received wider attention after making the cut at the 2023 PGA Championship, the only club professional to do so. After shooting par in the first round of the tournament, Block recorded birdies at three of his first five holes on his second round to move into joint-second place, before dropping three shots in two holes and finishing the day at even par. Another even-par 70 on the third round, for which he was paired with Justin Rose, saw Block move into a tie for eighth place after 54 holes. In his final round, playing alongside Rory McIlroy, Block scored a hole in one at the 15th hole on his way to a +1 final score; this score tied him for 15th place, earned him $288,000 in prize money (his previous top check was $75,000 for winning the 2014 PGA Professional Championship), and won him an automatic invitation to the 2024 PGA Championship. The only club professionals to previously finish higher at the tournament were Tommy Aycock in 1974 and Lonnie Nielsen in 1986, both of whom finished 11th. Block was also given a sponsor's exemption for the following week's Charles Schwab Challenge, where he finished last.

Block did not qualify for the U.S. Open in 2023 after failing to make the cut by two strokes at the RBC Canadian Open, for which he was offered an exemption. He also attempted to qualify for the 2023 Open Championship through final qualifying, but was not successful. Block nevertheless secured a place in another PGA Tour event when he qualified for The American Express, by winning his Southern California section championship in late September, and was later invited to play at the 2023 Australian Open, where he made the cut and finished tied for 27th.

=== PGA Tour Champions ===
Block turned 50 in June 2026. He received a sponsor exemption for the Dick's Open on the PGA Tour Champions, where he finished top-10. He tied for 5th at the Rogers Charity Classic and at The Ally Challenge, his fifth start, he took a two-shot lead into the final round and ultimately finished two strokes behind winner Steven Alker, in tied 3rd. Block fired a second round 63 to find himself in contention at the Jefferson Lehigh Valley Classic, ultimately finishing 3rd, again two strokes behind winner Steven Alker. He finished the regular season 42nd in the rankings to qualify for the Charles Schwab Cup playoffs.

== Amateur wins ==
- 1996 Southern Indiana Invitational, Owensboro Intercollegiate

== Professional wins (7) ==
- 2001 California State Open
- 2014 PGA Professional National Championship
- 2017 Southern California PGA Championship
- 2018 Southern California PGA Championship
- 2022 Southern California PGA Championship
- 2023 Southern California PGA Championship
- 2025 Southern California PGA Championship

== Results in major championships ==
| Tournament | 2007 | 2008 | 2009 |
|---|---|---|---|
| U.S. Open | CUT | | |
| PGA Championship | | | |

| Tournament | 2010 | 2011 | 2012 | 2013 | 2014 | 2015 | 2016 | 2017 | 2018 |
|---|---|---|---|---|---|---|---|---|---|
| U.S. Open | | | | | | | | | CUT |
| PGA Championship | | | | | CUT | | CUT | | CUT |

| Tournament | 2019 | 2020 | 2021 | 2022 | 2023 | 2024 | 2025 | 2026 |
|---|---|---|---|---|---|---|---|---|
| PGA Championship | | | | CUT | T15 | CUT | CUT | CUT |
| U.S. Open | | | | | | | | |

Did not play

"T" = tied
CUT = missed the halfway cut
Note: Block has only played in the PGA Championship and the U.S. Open.

== U.S. national team appearances ==
- PGA Cup: 2015, 2022 (winners)
