= Lee Hodges =

Lee Hodges may refer to:

- Lee Hodges (footballer, born 1973), English footballer from Epping, who played for Plymouth Argyle and Barnet
- Lee Hodges (footballer, born 1978), English footballer from Plaistow, who played for Scunthorpe United and Bristol Rovers
- Lee Hodges (golfer), American professional golfer
