= Southern California PGA Championship =

Golf tournament

The Southern California PGA Championship is a golf tournament that is the championship of the Southern California section of the PGA of America. The Southern California section was formed in 1924, and the tournament was first played that year. It has been held at various venues in Southern California on an annual basis since that time. The tournament has been won more than 25 times by players who also have victories on the PGA Tour.

== Winners ==
- 2026 Scott Cherry
- 2025 Michael Block
- 2024 Kyle Mendoza
- 2023 Michael Block
- 2022 Michael Block
- 2021 Kyle Mendoza
- 2020 Kyle Mendoza
- 2019 Jeff Hart
- 2018 Michael Block
- 2017 Michael Block
- 2016 Kenny Pigman
- 2015 Chad Sorensen
- 2014 Ryan Kennedy
- 2013 Alan Scheer
- 2012 Chris Starkjohann
- 2011 Mike Miles
- 2010 Chris Starkjohann
- 2009 Ron Skayhan
- 2008 Mike Miles
- 2007 Erik Wolf
- 2006 Ross Marcano
- 2005 Scott Miller
- 2004 Chris Starkjohann
- 2003 Geoffrey Dean
- 2002 Paul Dietsche
- 2001 Monty Leong
- 2000 Jeff Cranford
- 1999 Jeff Freeman
- 1998 Jeff Freeman
- 1997 Ken Conant
- 1996 Kelly Manos
- 1995 Dan Bateman
- 1994 Brad Sherfy
- 1993 Jerry Wisz
- 1992 Jeff Fairfield
- 1991 Chris Starkjohann
- 1990 Scott Mahlberg
- 1989 Scott Bentley
- 1988 Shawn McEntee
- 1987 Scott Chaffin
- 1986 Dave Barber
- 1985 Jim Woodward
- 1984 Paul Wise
- 1983 Paul Wise
- 1982 Curtis Sifford
- 1981 R. H. Sikes
- 1980 Curtis Sifford
- 1979 Chuck Montalbano
- 1978 Dave Barber
- 1977 Dennie Meyer
- 1976 Tommy Jacobs
- 1975 Jimmy Powell
- 1974 Paul McGuire
- 1973 Rafe Botts
- 1972 Tommy Jacobs
- 1971 Tommy Jacobs
- 1970 Jimmy Powell
- 1969 Jerry Steelsmith
- 1968 Jimmy Powell
- 1967 Mac Hunter
- 1966 Bob McCallister
- 1965 Ronnie Reif
- 1964 Wayne Sleepy
- 1963 Eric Monti
- 1962 Emil Scodeller
- 1961 No tournament
- 1960 Bud Holscher
- 1959 Jerry Barber
- 1958 Johnny Bulla
- 1957 Eric Monti
- 1956 Eric Monti
- 1955 Jim Ferrier
- 1954 Ralph Evans
- 1953 Eric Monti
- 1952 Eric Monti
- 1951 Ellsworth Vines
- 1950 Fay Coleman
- 1949 Zell Eaton
- 1948 Harry Bassler
- 1947 Paul Runyan
- 1946 Fay Coleman
- 1945 Dale Andreason
- 1944 Clayton Alridge
- 1943 Marvin Stahl
- 1942 Willie Hunter
- 1941 Bud Oakley
- 1940 Olin Dutra
- 1939 Willie Hunter
- 1938 Olin Dutra
- 1937 Stanley Kertes
- 1936 Stanley Kertes
- 1935 Eric Seaval
- 1934 Lew Scott
- 1933 Olin Dutra
- 1932 Olin Dutra
- 1931 Olin Dutra
- 1930 Olin Dutra
- 1929 Charlie Guest
- 1928 Ed Dudley
- 1927 Charlie Guest
- 1926 Charlie Guest
- 1925 George Kerrigan
- 1924 Dick Linares
