= 2021 PGA Championship =

103rd PGA Championship

Tournament information
- Dates: May 20–23, 2021
- Location: Kiawah Island, South Carolina; 32.612°N 80.023°W
- Courses: Kiawah Island Golf Resort; Ocean Course
- Organized by: PGA of America
- Tours: PGA Tour; European Tour; Japan Golf Tour

Statistics
- Par: 72
- Length: 7,876 yards (7,202 m)
- Field: 156 players, 81 after cut
- Cut: 149 (+5)
- Prize fund: $12,000,000 €9,808,513
- Winner's share: $2,160,000 €1,765,532

Champion
- (United States) Phil Mickelson
- 282 (−6)
- Location in the United States Location in South Carolina

The 2021 PGA Championship was the 103rd PGA Championship, held May 20–23 in South Carolina at Kiawah Island Golf Resort's Ocean Course on Kiawah Island. It was the second major championship at the Ocean Course, after the PGA Championship in August 2012.

Without spectators at the previous edition in August 2020 due to the COVID-19 pandemic, the PGA of America announced in February 2021 that 10,000 fans would be admitted daily.

Phil Mickelson won his second PGA Championship and sixth major, two strokes ahead of runners-up Brooks Koepka and Louis Oosthuizen. Aged fifty years and eleven months, he became the oldest to win a major, a distinction previously held by Julius Boros, the winner of the PGA Championship in 1968 at age 48.

== Venue ==
=== Course layout ===
The Ocean Course – 2021 PGA Championship
Tee	Rating/Slope	1	2	3	4	5	6	7	8	9	Out	10	11	12	13	14	15	16	17	18	In	Total
Par		4	5	4	4	3	4	5	3	4	36	4	5	4	4	3	4	5	3	4	36	72
Yards		396	557	390	484	207	490	579	198	514	3,815	447	593	484	497	238	466	608	223	505	4,061	7,876
Round 1		401	559	381	453	220	469	551	198	497	3,729	441	571	467	494	206	458	606	214	474	3,931	7,660
Round 2		381	543	387	451	223	500	571	178	492	3,726	453	582	474	471	198	467	600	198	486	3,929	7,655
Round 3		396	561	376	485	195	487	553	207	497	3,757	429	590	462	481	215	468	598	207	493	3,943	7,700
Round 4		402	562	293	479	214	445	563	191	469	3,618	440	569	450	464	230	469	583	231	503	3,939	7,557

Lengths of the course for previous majors:

- 7,676 yards (7,019 m), par 72 - 2012 PGA Championship

== Field ==
The field for the PGA Championship is sometimes regarded as the strongest in professional golf, routinely having the highest "strength of field rating" of the year according to the Official World Golf Ranking. A number of qualification criteria are used to determine the field, which includes past PGA champions, recent major winners, top finishers in the 2020 PGA Championship, Ryder Cup players, tournament and leading money winners on the PGA Tour, and twenty PGA club or teaching professionals. The PGA of America also issue invitations to players outside of these criteria, which is generally seen to include the top one hundred in the world rankings.

=== Criteria ===
This list details the qualification criteria for the 2021 PGA Championship and the players who qualified under them; any additional criteria under which players qualified is indicated in parentheses.

1. All past winners of the PGA Championship. (Note: The following former champions did not enter: Paul Azinger, Mark Brooks, Jack Burke Jr., Steve Elkington, Dow Finsterwald, Raymond Floyd, Al Geiberger, Wayne Grady, David Graham, Don January, Davis Love III, John Mahaffey, Larry Nelson, Bobby Nichols, Jack Nicklaus, Gary Player, Nick Price, Jeff Sluman, Dave Stockton, Hal Sutton, David Toms, Lee Trevino, Bob Tway, Lanny Wadkins.)

- Rich Beem
- Keegan Bradley (8)
- John Daly
- Jason Day (6,8)
- Jason Dufner
- Pádraig Harrington
- Martin Kaymer
- Brooks Koepka (3,8,9,10)
- Rory McIlroy (5,8,9,10)
- Shaun Micheel
- Phil Mickelson
- Collin Morikawa (6,8,10)
- Justin Thomas (5,8,9,10)
- Jimmy Walker
- Yang Yong-eun
- Tiger Woods (2) did not play.
- Vijay Singh withdrew due to a back injury.

2. Recent winners of the Masters Tournament (2017–2021)

- Sergio García (8,9,10)
- Dustin Johnson (3,6,8,9,10)
- Hideki Matsuyama (8)
- Patrick Reed (6,8,9,10)

3. Recent winners of the U.S. Open (2016–2020)

- Bryson DeChambeau (8,9,10)
- Gary Woodland

4. Recent winners of The Open Championship (2015–2019)

- Zach Johnson
- Shane Lowry (8)
- Jordan Spieth (8,9,10)
- Henrik Stenson
- Francesco Molinari withdrew due to a back injury.

5. Recent winners of The Players Championship (2019–2021)

6. The leading 15 players, and those tying for 15th place, in the 2020 PGA Championship

- Daniel Berger (8,10)
- Paul Casey (8,9)
- Cameron Champ
- Joel Dahmen (8,10)
- Tony Finau (8,9)
- Kim Si-woo (8,10)
- Jon Rahm (8,9,10)
- Justin Rose (9)
- Xander Schauffele (8)
- Scottie Scheffler (8)
- Matthew Wolff (8) did not play.

7. The leading 20 players in the 2021 PGA Professional Championship

- Danny Balin
- Peter Ballo
- Alex Beach
- Frank Bensel Jr.
- Tyler Collet
- Ben Cook
- Mark Geddes
- Larkin Gross
- Derek Holmes
- Greg Koch
- Rob Labritz
- Brad Marek
- Tim Pearce
- Ben Polland
- Patrick Rada
- Sonny Skinner
- Stuart Smith
- Joe Summerhays
- Omar Uresti
- Brett Walker

8. The 70 leading PGA Championship Points (Note: PGA Championship Points are based on official PGA Tour money earned.) earners from the 2020 WGC-FedEx St. Jude Invitational (and Barracuda Championship) through the 2021 Wells Fargo Championship (May 9, 2021)

- Abraham Ancer
- Sam Burns (10)
- Patrick Cantlay (10)
- Stewart Cink (10)
- Corey Conners
- Harris English (10)
- Matt Fitzpatrick
- Talor Gooch
- Lanto Griffin
- Emiliano Grillo
- Brian Harman
- Tyrrell Hatton (9)
- Russell Henley
- Jim Herman (10)
- Charley Hoffman
- Max Homa (10)
- Billy Horschel (10)
- Viktor Hovland (10)
- Mackenzie Hughes
- Im Sung-jae
- Matt Jones (10)
- Chris Kirk
- Kevin Kisner
- Jason Kokrak (10)
- Matt Kuchar
- Martin Laird (10)
- Marc Leishman (10)
- Adam Long
- Peter Malnati
- Maverick McNealy
- Sebastián Muñoz
- Kevin Na (10)
- Joaquín Niemann
- Louis Oosthuizen
- Carlos Ortiz (10)
- Ryan Palmer
- Webb Simpson (9)
- Cameron Smith (10)
- Brendan Steele
- Robert Streb (10)
- Brendon Todd
- Cameron Tringale
- Harold Varner III
- Bubba Watson (9)
- Richy Werenski
- Lee Westwood
- Aaron Wise
- Will Zalatoris

9. Playing members of the 2018 Ryder Cup teams, who are ranked within the top 100 on the Official World Golf Ranking as of May 9, 2021

- Tommy Fleetwood
- Ian Poulter

10. Winners of official tournaments on the PGA Tour from the 2020 Wyndham Championship until the start of the championship

- Brian Gay
- Branden Grace
- Lee Kyoung-hoon
- Hudson Swafford

11. PGA of America invitees (Note: The PGA of America usually invite all players ranked inside the top 100 of the Official World Golf Ranking. Twelve players with a world ranking of over 100 on May 9, 2021 were given invitations; ten of these had rankings between 101 and 122, while Schwartzel had a ranking of 157 and Stricker was ranked 233.)

- An Byeong-hun
- Christiaan Bezuidenhout
- Dean Burmester
- John Catlin
- George Coetzee
- Thomas Detry
- Rickie Fowler
- Dylan Frittelli
- Adam Hadwin
- Lucas Herbert
- Garrick Higgo
- Rasmus Højgaard
- Sam Horsfield
- Rikuya Hoshino
- Jazz Janewattananond
- Takumi Kanaya
- Chan Kim
- Kurt Kitayama
- Tom Lewis
- Robert MacIntyre
- Victor Perez
- Thomas Pieters
- J. T. Poston
- Aaron Rai
- Chez Reavie
- Antoine Rozner
- Kalle Samooja
- Charl Schwartzel
- Adam Scott
- Jason Scrivener
- Kevin Streelman
- Steve Stricker
- Brandon Stone
- Andy Sullivan
- Sami Välimäki
- Erik van Rooyen
- Daniel van Tonder
- Matt Wallace
- Bernd Wiesberger
- Danny Willett

12. If necessary, the field is completed by players in order of PGA Championship points earned (per 8.)

- Cameron Davis
- Harry Higgs
- Denny McCarthy
- Alex Norén

Alternates (per category 12):

1. Tom Hoge (78th in standings) – replaced Wolff
2. Wyndham Clark (82nd) – replaced Singh
3. Brandon Hagy (83rd) – replaced Molinari

== Round summaries ==
=== First round ===
Thursday, May 20, 2021

Corey Conners made six birdies and only one bogey in a round of 67 (−5) to take a two-shot lead after the first round. Two-time champion Brooks Koepka, despite making a double-bogey on his opening hole of the tournament, was part of a six-way tie for second at three-under that also included 2011 champion Keegan Bradley.

Defending champion Collin Morikawa opened with a two-under round of 70 and was tied for eighth with seven other players, including 2005 champion Phil Mickelson. Mickelson made four bogeys over his first six holes before rebounding with four birdies on the back nine. Rory McIlroy, who won by eight shots the last time the tournament was held at Kiawah Island in 2012, shot a three-over 75 and was tied for 77th after the first 18 holes.

Place	Player	Score	To par
1	(Canada) Corey Conners	67	−5
T2	(United States) Keegan Bradley	69	−3
T2	(Australia) Cameron Davis	69	−3
T2	(England) Sam Horsfield	69	−3
T2	(Norway) Viktor Hovland	69	−3
T2	(United States) Brooks Koepka	69	−3
T2	(United States) Aaron Wise	69	−3
T8	(South Africa) Branden Grace	70	−2
T8	(South Korea) Im Sung-jae	70	−2
T8	(Scotland) Martin Laird	70	−2
T8	(United States) Phil Mickelson	70	−2
T8	(United States) Collin Morikawa	70	−2
T8	(United States) Kevin Streelman	70	−2
T8	(United States) Cameron Tringale	70	−2
T8	(United States) Gary Woodland	70	−2

=== Second round ===
Friday, May 21, 2021

Phil Mickelson made five birdies over his last nine holes, including a 23-foot putt on the ninth (his 18th), to share the 36-hole lead with Louis Oosthuizen at five-under. At the age of 50, Mickelson became the oldest player to lead the PGA Championship after the second round since Sam Snead in 1966. He also became the sixth player to hold the lead in a major championship in four different decades.

Oosthuizen was five-under on his round before making his only bogey at the 18th to fall into a tie with Mickelson. Two-time champion Brooks Koepka made two eagles and got into a share of the lead at six-under before bogeys at the 15th and 17th; he shot 71 (−1) to finish a shot off the lead.

Masters champion Hideki Matsuyama was also five-under for the round and one back before making bogey on 18. His four-under 68 tied Oosthuizen for lowest round of the day. First-round leader Corey Conners bogeyed five of his first six holes and shot 75 (+3) to fall into a tie for seventh place, three shots back.

The 36-hole cut came at 149 (+5). Notables to miss the cut included Dustin Johnson and Justin Thomas, the two top players on the World Golf Rankings, as well as Cameron Tringale, who began the round inside the top 10 but shot 10-over 82 after suffering through a 12-over-par 48 on the back nine Friday (his front nine). Tringale rebounded with a 2-under 34 on the front, but the cut was 5-over and he missed by three.

Place	Player	Score	To par
T1	(United States) Phil Mickelson	70-69=139	−5
T1	(South Africa) Louis Oosthuizen	71-68=139	−5
3	(United States) Brooks Koepka	69-71=140	−4
T4	(South Africa) Christiaan Bezuidenhout	71-70=141	−3
T4	(South Africa) Branden Grace	70-71=141	−3
T4	(Japan) Hideki Matsuyama	73-68=141	−3
T7	(England) Paul Casey	71-71=142	−2
T7	(Canada) Corey Conners	67-75=142	−2
T7	(South Korea) Im Sung-jae	70-72=142	−2
T7	(United States) Kevin Streelman	70-72=142	−2
T7	(United States) Gary Woodland	70-72=142	−2

=== Third round ===
Saturday, May 22, 2021

Phil Mickelson, tied for the lead at the start of the round, went four-under on the front nine and added another birdie on the 10th to open up a five-shot lead at 10-under. At the 12th, he hit his tee shot into a sandy area and had to chip out into the fairway, making his first bogey in 20 holes. His drive on the 13th went into the water hazard to the right of the fairway, leading to a double-bogey that dropped his lead to just one shot. He made par on his last five holes to finish with a two-under round of 70 and seven-under for the tournament.

Brooks Koepka, meanwhile, holed birdie putts from 11 feet on the 10th and 20 feet on the 12th and was three-under on the back nine to tie Mickelson at seven-under. At the 18th, however, he failed to get up-and-down from behind the green and made bogey to fall to six-under, one behind Mickelson.

Louis Oosthuizen, playing in the final group with Mickelson, also drove into the water on 13 and made bogey, then three-putted from 25 feet on the 17th for another bogey. He shot even-par 72 and finished two back of the lead at five-under.

At 50, Mickelson became the oldest 54-hole leader in PGA Championship history, and the oldest in any major since Tom Watson at the 2009 Open Championship.

Place	Player	Score	To par
1	(United States) Phil Mickelson	70-69-70=209	−7
2	(United States) Brooks Koepka	69-71-70=210	−6
3	(South Africa) Louis Oosthuizen	71-68-72=211	−5
4	(United States) Kevin Streelman	70-72-70=212	−4
T5	(South Africa) Christiaan Bezuidenhout	71-70-72=213	−3
T5	(South Africa) Branden Grace	70-71-72=213	−3
T7	(United States) Bryson DeChambeau	72-71-71=214	−2
T7	(Chile) Joaquín Niemann	71-72-71=214	−2
T7	(United States) Gary Woodland	70-72-72=214	−2
T10	(England) Paul Casey	71-71-73=215	−1
T10	(Canada) Corey Conners	67-75-73=215	−1
T10	(South Korea) Im Sung-jae	70-72-73=215	−1

=== Final round ===
Sunday, May 23, 2021

==== Summary ====
Phil Mickelson, at the age of 50, became the oldest golfer to win a major championship, shooting a one-over 73 to finish two shots ahead of Brooks Koepka and Louis Oosthuizen.

Mickelson began the round with a one-shot lead over Koepka, but fell from atop the leaderboard after making bogey on the first while Koepka made birdie to grab the lead. Mickelson regained the lead with a birdie on the par-five second hole as Koepka suffered a double-bogey. At the par-three fifth, Mickelson found a sandy area off the tee but holed his shot for a birdie. Even-par making the turn, he led Koepka and Oosthuizen by two.

Mickelson extended his lead on the 10th, holing a 12-foot putt for birdie. When Koepka made bogey on both 10 and 11, Mickelson opened up a four-shot lead. Oosthuizen, meanwhile, fell from contention after hitting his third shot on the 13th into the water and making double-bogey. He came back with a birdie at the par-five 16th and shot 73, finishing at four-under for the tournament.

Koepka was four-over between holes 7–13 before making birdies on the 15th and 16th, joining Oosthuizen at four-under after a two-over 74. Mickelson saw his lead cut in half after also finding the water with his approach on 13, settling for a bogey before dropping another shot on the 14th. At the 16th, he hit a 366-yard drive, the longest of any player on that hole all tournament, and got up-and-down from over the green for a birdie to get to seven-under. Despite making a bogey on the par-three 17th after having to chop out of thick rough, he tapped in for par on the 18th to win his second PGA Championship and sixth major championship.

==== Final leaderboard ====
Champion
Crystal Bowl winner (leading PGA Club Pro)
(c) = past champion

Top 10
Place	Player	Score	To par	Money ($)
1	(United States) Phil Mickelson (c)	70-69-70-73=282	−6	2,160,000
T2	(United States) Brooks Koepka (c)	69-71-70-74=284	−4	1,056,000
T2	(South Africa) Louis Oosthuizen	71-68-72-73=284	−4	1,056,000
T4	(England) Paul Casey	71-71-73-71=286	−2	462,250
T4	(Republic of Ireland) Pádraig Harrington (c)	71-73-73-69=286	−2	462,250
T4	(United States) Harry Higgs	72-71-73-70=286	−2	462,250
T4	(Republic of Ireland) Shane Lowry	73-71-73-69=286	−2	462,250
T8	(Mexico) Abraham Ancer	74-72-76-65=287	−1	263,000
T8	(United States) Tony Finau	74-72-70-71=287	−1	263,000
T8	(United States) Rickie Fowler	71-76-69-71=287	−1	263,000
T8	(United States) Collin Morikawa (c)	70-75-74-68=287	−1	263,000
T8	(Spain) Jon Rahm	72-75-72-68=287	−1	263,000
T8	(England) Justin Rose	72-75-73-67=287	−1	263,000
T8	(United States) Scottie Scheffler	72-74-71-70=287	−1	263,000
T8	(United States) Kevin Streelman	70-72-70-75=287	−1	263,000
T8	(United States) Will Zalatoris	71-74-72-70=287	−1	263,000

Leaderboard below the top 10
Place	Player	Score	To par	Money ($)
T17	(United States) Keegan Bradley (c)	69-75-72-72=288	E	168,000
T17	(Canada) Corey Conners	67-75-73-73=288	E	168,000
T17	(United States) Charley Hoffman	73-70-73-72=288	E	168,000
T17	(South Korea) Im Sung-jae	70-72-73-73=288	E	168,000
T17	(United States) Patrick Reed	74-75-69-70=288	E	168,000
T17	(United States) Aaron Wise	69-79-72-68=288	E	168,000
T23	(United States) Patrick Cantlay	73-73-70-73=289	+1	103,814
T23	(England) Matt Fitzpatrick	73-71-72-73=289	+1	103,814
T23	(United States) Billy Horschel	77-72-68-72=289	+1	103,814
T23	(United States) Chan Kim	75-74-73-67=289	+1	103,814
T23	(Scotland) Martin Laird	70-73-74-72=289	+1	103,814
T23	(Japan) Hideki Matsuyama	73-68-76-72=289	+1	103,814
T23	(Australia) Jason Scrivener	73-75-72-69=289	+1	103,814
T30	(South Africa) Christiaan Bezuidenhout	71-70-72-77=290	+2	59,750
T30	(United States) Stewart Cink	71-76-74-69=290	+2	59,750
T30	(Norway) Viktor Hovland	69-75-75-71=290	+2	59,750
T30	(Australia) Matt Jones	73-75-74-68=290	+2	59,750
T30	(Chile) Joaquín Niemann	71-72-71-76=290	+2	59,750
T30	(England) Ian Poulter	74-70-73-73=290	+2	59,750
T30	(United States) Webb Simpson	75-74-69-72=290	+2	59,750
T30	(United States) Jordan Spieth	73-75-68-74=290	+2	59,750
T38	(United States) Bryson DeChambeau	72-71-71-77=291	+3	42,000
T38	(South Africa) Branden Grace	70-71-72-78=291	+3	42,000
T38	(Argentina) Emiliano Grillo	77-72-72-70=291	+3	42,000
T38	(England) Tyrrell Hatton	71-75-73-72=291	+3	42,000
T38	(United States) Richy Werenski	71-72-73-75=291	+3	42,000
T38	(United States) Gary Woodland	70-72-72-77=291	+3	42,000
T44	(United States) Ben Cook	72-77-69-74=292	+4	31,300
T44	(Australia) Jason Day (c)	74-75-72-71=292	+4	31,300
T44	(United States) Talor Gooch	71-78-70-73=292	+4	31,300
T44	(United States) Steve Stricker	76-71-70-75=292	+4	31,300
T44	(South Africa) Daniel van Tonder	75-70-74-73=292	+4	31,300
T49	(South Korea) An Byeong-hun	73-75-77-68=293	+5	24,950
T49	(England) Sam Horsfield	69-80-73-71=293	+5	24,950
T49	(United States) Jason Kokrak	71-72-73-77=293	+5	24,950
T49	(Scotland) Robert MacIntyre	75-73-72-73=293	+5	24,950
T49	(Northern Ireland) Rory McIlroy (c)	75-72-74-72=293	+5	24,950
T49	(United States) Harold Varner III	73-76-71-73=293	+5	24,950
T55	(United States) Joel Dahmen	74-73-70-77=294	+6	22,475
T55	(Sweden) Alex Norén	77-72-70-75=294	+6	22,475
T55	(Mexico) Carlos Ortiz	73-74-71-76=294	+6	22,475
T55	(England) Matt Wallace	73-73-77-71=294	+6	22,475
T59	(South Africa) Dean Burmester	74-74-74-73=295	+7	21,400
T59	(Australia) Cameron Davis	69-78-76-72=295	+7	21,400
T59	(United States) Denny McCarthy	73-76-72-74=295	+7	21,400
T59	(Australia) Cameron Smith	72-73-73-77=295	+7	21,400
T59	(United States) Robert Streb	77-72-74-72=295	+7	21,400
T64	(United States) Harris English	75-74-75-72=296	+8	20,200
T64	(Canada) Adam Hadwin	77-71-76-72=296	+8	20,200
T64	(South Africa) Garrick Higgo	73-76-78-69=296	+8	20,200
T64	(United States) Tom Hoge	74-75-74-73=296	+8	20,200
T64	(Sweden) Henrik Stenson	73-76-76-71=296	+8	20,200
T64	(United States) Jimmy Walker (c)	73-74-75-74=296	+8	20,200
T64	(England) Danny Willett	77-71-74-74=296	+8	20,200
T71	(United States) Russell Henley	78-70-74-75=297	+9	19,350
T71	(Australia) Lucas Herbert	76-72-77-72=297	+9	19,350
T71	(England) Tom Lewis	71-74-76-76=297	+9	19,350
T71	(England) Lee Westwood	73-72-75-77=297	+9	19,350
T75	(United States) Daniel Berger	79-69-74-76=298	+10	19,050
T75	(United States) Wyndham Clark	75-74-72-77=298	+10	19,050
77	(United States) Brendan Steele	75-74-77-73=299	+11	18,900
78	(United States) Brad Marek	73-73-78-76=300	+12	18,800
79	(Denmark) Rasmus Højgaard	71-76-79-75=301	+13	18,700
80	(United States) Bubba Watson	72-73-77-80=302	+14	18,600
81	(United States) Brian Gay	77-71-80-78=306	+18	18,500
CUT	(Spain) Sergio García	77-73=150	+6	3,200
CUT	(United States) Brian Harman	75-75=150	+6	3,200
CUT	(Canada) Mackenzie Hughes	75-75=150	+6	3,200
CUT	(United States) Dustin Johnson	76-74=150	+6	3,200
CUT	(Australia) Marc Leishman	74-76=150	+6	3,200
CUT	(United States) Peter Malnati	78-72=150	+6	3,200
CUT	(France) Victor Perez	78-72=150	+6	3,200
CUT	(United States) Chez Reavie	77-73=150	+6	3,200
CUT	(France) Antoine Rozner	79-71=150	+6	3,200
CUT	(United States) Xander Schauffele	73-77=150	+6	3,200
CUT	(Australia) Adam Scott	78-72=150	+6	3,200
CUT	(England) Andy Sullivan	73-77=150	+6	3,200
CUT	(United States) Justin Thomas (c)	75-75=150	+6	3,200
CUT	(United States) Rich Beem (c)	74-77=151	+7	3,200
CUT	(Belgium) Thomas Detry	76-75=151	+7	3,200
CUT	(England) Tommy Fleetwood	76-75=151	+7	3,200
CUT	(South Korea) Kim Si-woo	75-76=151	+7	3,200
CUT	(United States) Maverick McNealy	78-73=151	+7	3,200
CUT	(Colombia) Sebastián Muñoz	77-74=151	+7	3,200
CUT	(United States) Brendon Todd	74-77=151	+7	3,200
CUT	(United States) Danny Balin	79-73=152	+8	3,200
CUT	(United States) Jason Dufner (c)	71-81=152	+8	3,200
CUT	(South Africa) Dylan Frittelli	73-79=152	+8	3,200
CUT	(United States) Lanto Griffin	74-78=152	+8	3,200
CUT	(United States) Zach Johnson	74-78=152	+8	3,200
CUT	(Germany) Martin Kaymer (c)	75-77=152	+8	3,200
CUT	(United States) Chris Kirk	76-76=152	+8	3,200
CUT	(United States) Ryan Palmer	74-78=152	+8	3,200
CUT	(United States) Cameron Tringale	70-82=152	+8	3,200
CUT	(United States) Jim Herman	78-75=153	+9	3,200
CUT	(United States) Greg Koch	76-77=153	+9	3,200
CUT	(United States) J. T. Poston	75-78=153	+9	3,200
CUT	(United States) Hudson Swafford	77-76=153	+9	3,200
CUT	(South Africa) Erik van Rooyen	72-81=153	+9	3,200
CUT	(Austria) Bernd Wiesberger	78-75=153	+9	3,200
CUT	(United States) John Catlin	75-79=154	+10	3,200
CUT	(South Africa) George Coetzee	75-79=154	+10	3,200
CUT	(United States) Max Homa	78-76=154	+10	3,200
CUT	(United States) Kevin Kisner	77-77=154	+10	3,200
CUT	(United States) Kurt Kitayama	77-77=154	+10	3,200
CUT	(United States) Matt Kuchar	77-77=154	+10	3,200
CUT	(United States) Adam Long	72-82=154	+10	3,200
CUT	(Finland) Kalle Samooja	74-80=154	+10	3,200
CUT	(Finland) Sami Välimäki	78-76=154	+10	3,200
CUT	(United States) Brett Walker	77-77=154	+10	3,200
CUT	(United States) Peter Ballo	80-75=155	+11	3,200
CUT	(South Korea) Lee Kyoung-hoon	78-77=155	+11	3,200
CUT	(South Africa) Charl Schwartzel	76-79=155	+11	3,200
CUT	(England) Mark Geddes	75-81=156	+12	3,200
CUT	(United States) Tim Pearce	79-77=156	+12	3,200
CUT	(United States) Ben Polland	76-80=156	+12	3,200
CUT	(England) Aaron Rai	81-75=156	+12	3,200
CUT	(United States) Brandon Hagy	77-80=157	+13	3,200
CUT	(Thailand) Jazz Janewattananond	77-80=157	+13	3,200
CUT	(United States) Rob Labritz	76-81=157	+13	3,200
CUT	(United States) Kevin Na	79-78=157	+13	3,200
CUT	(United States) Cameron Champ	82-77=159	+15	3,200
CUT	(Japan) Rikuya Hoshino	76-83=159	+15	3,200
CUT	(United States) Stuart Smith	82-77=159	+15	3,200
CUT	(Belgium) Thomas Pieters	76-84=160	+16	3,200
CUT	(United States) Alex Beach	75-86=161	+17	3,200
CUT	(Japan) Takumi Kanaya	75-86=161	+17	3,200
CUT	(United States) Shaun Micheel (c)	81-80=161	+17	3,200
CUT	(South Africa) Brandon Stone	78-83=161	+17	3,200
CUT	(United States) Patrick Rada	76-86=162	+18	3,200
CUT	(United States) Sonny Skinner	85-78=163	+19	3,200
CUT	(United States) Larkin Gross	80-84=164	+20	3,200
CUT	(United States) Frank Bensel Jr.	86-79=165	+21	3,200
CUT	(United States) Derek Holmes	79-86=165	+21	3,200
CUT	(United States) Joe Summerhays	81-84=165	+21	3,200
CUT	(United States) Omar Uresti	82-83=165	+21	3,200
CUT	(United States) Tyler Collet	88-82=170	+26	3,200
CUT	(United States) John Daly (c)	85-86=171	+27	3,200
DQ	(South Korea) Yang Yong-eun (c)	75-83=158	+14	3,200
WD	(United States) Sam Burns			3,200

==== Scorecard ====
Final round

Hole	1	2	3	4	5	6	7	8	9	10	11	12	13	14	15	16	17	18
Par	4	5	4	4	3	4	5	3	4	4	5	4	4	3	4	5	3	4
(United States) Mickelson	−6	−7	−6	−6	−7	−6	−7	−7	−7	−8	−8	−8	−7	−6	−6	−7	−6	−6
(United States) Koepka	−7	−5	−5	−5	−5	−6	−5	−5	−5	−4	−3	−3	−2	−2	−3	−4	−4	−4
(South Africa) Oosthuizen	−5	−5	−5	−5	−4	−4	−5	−5	−5	−4	−4	−5	−3	−3	−3	−4	−4	−4
(England) Casey	−1	−2	−3	−3	−2	−2	−3	−3	−2	−2	−1	−2	−1	−1	−1	−2	−2	−2
(Republic of Ireland) Harrington	+1	−1	−2	−1	E	E	−1	−1	−2	−2	−2	−2	−2	−3	−2	−2	−2	−2
(United States) Higgs	−1	−1	−1	−1	−1	−1	−2	−2	−2	−2	−2	−2	−2	−2	−2	−2	−2	−2
(Republic of Ireland) Lowry	+2	+1	E	+1	E	+1	+1	+1	E	E	E	−1	−1	−1	−1	−2	−2	−2

Cumulative tournament scores, relative to par

Eagle	Birdie	Bogey	Double Bogey

== Media ==
ESPN and CBS have the media rights to the 2021 PGA Championship. This marks the second year of the media rights deal signed in October 2018, replacing the old deal with TNT and CBS. In the UK and Ireland, Sky Sports broadcast the event. This is the 31st consecutive PGA Championship on CBS Sports.
