= Bo Hoag =

American professional golfer (born 1988)

Personal information
- Nationality: United States
- Born: July 25, 1988 (age 38) Columbus, Ohio, U.S.
- Height: 6 ft 2 in (1.88 m)
- Weight: 185 lb (84 kg; 13.2 st)
- Spouse: Kristen Hoag (m. 2020)

Career
- Sport: Golf
- College: Ohio State University
- Turned professional: 2011
- Current tour: PGA Tour
- Former tours: PGA Tour Canada; Korn Ferry Tour
- Professional wins: 1

Number of wins by tour
- Korn Ferry Tour: 1

Best results in major championships
- Masters Tournament: DNP
- PGA Championship: DNP
- U.S. Open: CUT: 2021, 2022
- The Open Championship: DNP

Bo Hoag (born July 25, 1988) is an American professional golfer who plays on the PGA Tour. Hoag began golfing at an early age and grew up a few blocks from renowned golfer Jack Nicklaus's boyhood home. He was named the 2006 Ohio Player of the Year and was the 2006 Division I Ohio High School individual medalist on Upper Arlington High School's Division I state championship team. After playing collegiate golf at Ohio State University and a season on the PGA Tour Canada, Hoag won the 2019 WinCo Foods Portland Open on the Korn Ferry Tour to clinch his PGA Tour card.

== Early years and education ==
Hoag was born in Columbus, Ohio and raised in Upper Arlington, Ohio. His grandfather, Robert Hoag, was a founding member and eventual chairman emeritus of Muirfield Village Golf Club in Dublin, Ohio, the Jack Nicklaus-designed golf course that hosts the yearly Memorial Tournament on the PGA Tour. Like Nicklaus, Hoag played for Upper Arlington High School. Hoag was the Ohio Capital Conference League Player of the year in 2004, 2005, and 2006. The 2006 season culminated in Hoag winning individual state medalist honors as part of Upper Arlington's Division I State Championship team in men's golf.

Hoag played collegiate golf at the Ohio State University, again like Nicklaus, where he earned first-team All-Big Ten honors in 2009 and 2011 and was an honorable mention All-American in 2009. He averaged 73.04 strokes per 18 holes in college, the fourth-best career average in Ohio State history.

== Professional career ==
Hoag turned professional in 2011 after graduating from Ohio State with a degree in economics. He scored low in an open qualifier and played his first PGA Tour event in 2012 at the Honda Classic in Florida and was awarded a special exemption to play in the 2012 Memorial Tournament. After playing the 2013 season on the PGA Tour Canada, Hoag played from 2017 to 2019 on the Korn Ferry Tour. In 2019, Hoag ranked 2nd on the Korn Ferry Tour in greens in regulation at 76% and 8th in scoring average at 69.71 strokes per round. He won the WinCo Foods Portland Open on August 11, 2019, after shooting −22 over the four days to capture not only his first professional victory but also his PGA Tour card for the 2019–20 PGA Tour season.

During the 2019–20 PGA Tour season, Hoag barely retained his PGA Tour card after finishing 125th on the FedEx Cup points list (the top 125 earn cards for the following season).

After making only 15 of 31 cuts during the 2020–21 PGA Tour season, Hoag lost his PGA Tour card, but retained conditional status, which enabled him to get into some tournaments during the 2021–22 PGA Tour season.

== Amateur wins ==
- 2009 Monroe Invitational

== Professional wins (1) ==
=== Korn Ferry Tour wins (1) ===
No.	Date	Tournament	Winning score	Margin of victory	Runner-up
1	Aug 11, 2019	WinCo Foods Portland Open	−22 (66-68-63-65=262)	2 strokes	(United States) Scott Harrington

== Results in major championships ==
Tournament	2021	2022
Masters Tournament		
PGA Championship		
U.S. Open	CUT	CUT
The Open Championship		

Did not play

CUT = missed the half-way cut

== Results in The Players Championship ==
Tournament	2021
The Players Championship	CUT

CUT = missed the halfway cut

== Personal ==
Hoag has great interest in cars and lists Freakonomics as his favorite book. He considers Jack Nicklaus as a personal friend and mentor.

== See also ==
- 2019 Korn Ferry Tour Finals graduates
