= WinCo Foods Portland Open =

Golf tournament

Coordinates: 45.614°N 123.002°W

Tournament information
- Location: North Plains, Oregon
- Established: 2014
- Courses: Pumpkin Ridge Golf Club (Witch Hollow Course)
- Par: 71
- Length: 7,041 yards (6,438 m)
- Tour: Korn Ferry Tour
- Format: Stroke play
- Prize fund: US$800,000
- Month played: August
- Final year: 2020

Tournament record score
- Aggregate: 262 Bo Hoag (2019)
- To par: −22 as above

Final champion
- (United States) Lee Hodges
- Location in the United States Location in Oregon

The WinCo Foods Portland Open was a golf tournament in Oregon on the Korn Ferry Tour. It debuted in August 2014 at Pumpkin Ridge Golf Club in North Plains, a suburb northwest of Portland. Northwest-based supermarket chain WinCo Foods was named as the title sponsor in June 2013. After a seven-year run, the tournament was removed from the Korn Ferry Tour schedule in 2021 due to WinCo Foods ending its title sponsorship.

With the exception of 2020 (when the season was altered due to the COVID-19 pandemic), the Portland Open was always the last regular-season event on the Korn Ferry Tour. Played on the Witch Hollow course, the tournament gave players one last chance to place in the top 25 on the money list to earn a PGA Tour card or play their way into the top 75 to retain full Korn Ferry Tour privileges and earn a chance at a PGA Tour card via the Korn Ferry Tour Finals.

== Winners ==
Korn Ferry Tour (Championship Series)	2020
Korn Ferry Tour (Regular)	2014–2019

#	Year	Winner	Score	To par	Margin of victory	Runner(s)-up
7th	2020	(United States) Lee Hodges	273	−11	2 strokes	(France) Paul Barjon (United States) David Lipsky (United States) Chad Ramey (China) Yuan Yechun
6th	2019	(United States) Bo Hoag	262	−22	2 strokes	(United States) Scott Harrington
5th	2018	(South Korea) Im Sung-jae	266	−18	4 strokes	(United States) John Chin
4th	2017	(United States) Brice Garnett	266	−18	4 strokes	(Mexico) Abraham Ancer (United States) Sam Ryder (Canada) Ben Silverman (England) David Skinns
3rd	2016	(United States) Ryan Brehm	269	−15	1 stroke	(United States) Mark Anderson
2nd	2015	(United States) Dicky Pride	264	−20	3 strokes	(United States) Tim Herron
1st	2014	(Mexico) Carlos Ortiz	270	−14	1 stroke	(United States) Jason Gore (Canada) Adam Hadwin

== See also ==
- Portland Open, a PGA Tour event from 1944 to 1966
- Cambia Portland Classic, a current event on the LPGA Tour
