= 2023 Open Championship field =

This page lists the criteria used to determine the field for the 2023 Open Championship and the players who qualified.

The Open Championship field is made up of 156 players, who gained entry through various exemption criteria and qualifying tournaments. (Note: (a) – indicates the player is an amateur.) The criteria included past Open champions, recent major winners, top ranked players in the world rankings and from the leading world tours, and winners and high finishers from various designated tournaments, including the Open Qualifying Series; the winners of designated amateur events, including The Amateur Championship and U.S. Amateur, also gained exemption provided they remain an amateur. Anyone not qualifying via exemption, and had a handicap of 0.4 or lower, can gain entry through regional and final qualifying events.

Most exemption criteria remained unchanged from previous years; changes included the removal of exemptions for recent Ryder Cup and Presidents Cup players, and a new exemption for amateur golfers.

== Criteria and exemptions ==
Each player is classified according to the first category in which he qualified, but other categories are shown in parentheses.

1. The Open Champions aged 60 or under on 23 July 2023

- Stewart Cink
- Darren Clarke (20)
- John Daly
- Ernie Els (2)
- Pádraig Harrington
- Zach Johnson (2)
- Shane Lowry (2,4,5,6)
- Rory McIlroy (2,3,4,5,12)
- Phil Mickelson (2,10)
- Francesco Molinari (2)
- Collin Morikawa (2,4,10,12)
- Louis Oosthuizen
- Cameron Smith (2,3,4,11,12)
- Jordan Spieth (2,3,4,12)
- Henrik Stenson (2)
- Ben Curtis, David Duval, Todd Hamilton, Paul Lawrie, Justin Leonard, and Tiger Woods (9) did not enter.

2. The Open Champions for 2012–2022 (Note: All will be aged 60 or under on 23 July 2023.)

3. Top 10 finishers and ties in the 2022 Open Championship

- Patrick Cantlay (4,12)
- Bryson DeChambeau (8)
- Tommy Fleetwood (4,5)
- Brian Harman (4,12)
- Viktor Hovland (4,5,12)
- Dustin Johnson (9)
- Cameron Young (4,12)

4. Top 50 players in the Official World Golf Ranking (OWGR) for Week 21, 2023

- Abraham Ancer
- Keegan Bradley
- Sam Burns (12)
- Wyndham Clark (8) (Note: Wyndham Clark initially qualified through the Wells Fargo Championship, but after he subsequently qualified through category 4, his OQS spot was reallocated to Brendon Todd.)
- Corey Conners (12)
- Jason Day
- Harris English (Note: Harris English and Kurt Kitayama initially qualified through the Arnold Palmer Invitational, but after both subsequently qualified through category 4, their OQS spots were reallocated to Ben Griffin and Trey Mullinax.)
- Tony Finau (12)
- Matt Fitzpatrick (5,8,12)
- Rickie Fowler
- Ryan Fox (5)
- Emiliano Grillo
- Tyrrell Hatton (5,6)
- Russell Henley
- Lucas Herbert
- Tom Hoge (12)
- Max Homa (12)
- Billy Horschel (6,12)
- Im Sung-jae (12)
- Kim Si-woo
- Tom Kim
- Chris Kirk
- Kurt Kitayama
- Brooks Koepka (8,10)
- Lee Kyoung-hoon (12)
- Hideki Matsuyama (9,12)
- Adrian Meronk (5)
- Taylor Moore
- Joaquín Niemann (12)
- Séamus Power
- Jon Rahm (5,8,9,12)
- Patrick Reed (9)
- Justin Rose
- Xander Schauffele (12)
- Scottie Scheffler (9,11,12)
- Adam Scott (12)
- Sepp Straka (12)
- Sahith Theegala (12)
- Justin Thomas (10,11,12)
- Will Zalatoris (5,12) did not enter.

5. Top 30 in the final 2022 DP World Tour Rankings

- Adri Arnaus
- Richard Bland
- Ewen Ferguson
- Rasmus Højgaard
- Pablo Larrazábal
- Thriston Lawrence
- Hurly Long
- Robert MacIntyre
- Guido Migliozzi
- Alex Norén
- Thorbjørn Olesen
- Adrián Otaegui
- Yannik Paul
- Victor Perez
- Thomas Pieters
- Richie Ramsay
- Shubhankar Sharma
- Callum Shinkwin
- Jordan Smith
- Connor Syme

6. Recent winners of the BMW PGA Championship (2019–2022)

- Danny Willett

7. Top five players, not already exempt, within the top 20 of the 2023 Race to Dubai through the BMW International Open

- Alexander Björk
- Jorge Campillo
- Romain Langasque
- Joost Luiten
- Marcel Siem

8. Recent winners of the U.S. Open (2018–2023)

- Gary Woodland

9. Recent winners of the Masters Tournament (2018–2023)

10. Recent winners of the PGA Championship (2017–2023)

11. Recent winners of The Players Championship (2021–2023)

12. The top 30 players from the 2022 FedEx Cup points list

- Talor Gooch
- J. T. Poston
- Scott Stallings

13. Top five players, not already exempt, within the top 20 of the 2022–23 FedEx Cup points list through the Travelers Championship

- Nick Taylor

14. Winner of the 2022 Visa Open de Argentina

- Zack Fischer

15. Winner of the 2022–23 PGA Tour of Australasia Order of Merit

- David Micheluzzi

16. Winner of the 2022–23 Sunshine Tour Order of Merit

- Ockie Strydom

17. Winner of the 2022 Japan Open Golf Championship

- Taiga Semikawa

18. Top two players on the 2022 Japan Golf Tour Official Money List

- Kazuki Higa
- Rikuya Hoshino

19. The top player, not already exempt, on the 2023 Japan Golf Tour Official Money List through the BMW Japan Golf Tour Championship Mori Building Cup

- Hiroshi Iwata

20. Winner of the 2022 Senior Open Championship

21. Winner of the 2023 Amateur Championship (Note: Players must remain amateurs in order to be exempt under this category.)

- Christo Lamprecht (a)

22. Winner of the 2022 U.S. Amateur

- ~~Sam Bennett~~ (Note: Bennett forfeited his exemption by turning professional.)

23. Winner of the 2023 European Amateur

- José Luis Ballester (a)

24. Recipient of the 2022 Mark H. McCormack Medal

- ~~Keita Nakajima~~ (Note: Nakajima forfeited his exemption by turning professional, but subsequently qualified through the Open Qualifying Series.)

25. Winner of the 2022 Asia-Pacific Amateur Championship

- Harrison Crowe (a)

26. Winner of the 2023 Latin America Amateur Championship

- Mateo Fernández de Oliveira (a)

27. Winner of the 2023 Open Amateur Series (Note: Cumulative World Amateur Golf Ranking points from the St Andrews Links Trophy, The Amateur Championship and European Amateur.)

- Alex Maguire (a)

=== Open Qualifying Series ===
The Open Qualifying Series (OQS) for the 2023 Open Championship consists of 11 events. Places are available to the leading players (not otherwise exempt) who make the cut. In the event of ties, positions go to players ranked highest according to that week's OWGR. Unlike in previous years, if a player who has qualified through OQS becomes exempt through other criteria before 1 June, the next highest non-exempt finisher from that OQS event will become exempt.

Location	Tournament	Date	Spots	Qualifiers	Ref.
South Africa	Joburg Open	27 Nov 2022	3	Christiaan Bezuidenhout, Dan Bradbury, Sami Välimäki	
Australia	ISPS Handa Australian Open	4 Dec 2022	3	Haydn Barron, Alejandro Cañizares, Min Woo Lee	
United States	Arnold Palmer Invitational	5 Mar 2023	3	Ben Griffin, Trey Mullinax, Davis Riley	
Hong Kong	World City Championship	26 Mar 2023	4	~~Michael Hendry~~, (Note: Michael Hendry did not play after being diagnosed with leukemia in May 2023. The following year, he was given a medical exemption into the 2024 Open.) Kho Taichi, Kim Bi-o, Travis Smyth	
United States	Wells Fargo Championship	7 May 2023	3	Michael Kim, Denny McCarthy, Brendon Todd	
Japan	Gateway to The Open Mizuno Open	28 May 2023	4	Kensei Hirata, Takumi Kanaya, Keita Nakajima, Kazuki Yasumori	
United States	Memorial Tournament	4 Jun 2023	3	Lee Hodges, Andrew Putnam, Adam Schenk	
South Korea	Kolon Korea Open	25 Jun 2023	2	Seungsu Han, Kang Kyung-nam	
England	Betfred British Masters	2 Jul 2023	3	Daniel Hillier, Gunner Wiebe, Oliver Wilson	
Denmark	Made in HimmerLand	9 Jul 2023	3	Nacho Elvira, Kalle Samooja, Marc Warren	
Scotland	Genesis Scottish Open	16 Jul 2023	3	An Byeong-hun, Nicolai Højgaard, David Lingmerth	

=== Final Qualifying ===
Final qualifying was played on 4 July at four locations, with 117 players who advanced from regional qualifying events (held on 26 June at 15 locations) as well as those exempt from regional qualifying.

Location	Spots	Qualifiers (Note: (R) – indicates a golfer who came through Regional Qualifying.)
Dundonald Links	4	Connor McKinney (R), Marco Penge, Graeme Robertson (R), Michael Stewart
Royal Cinque Ports	5	Thomas Detry, Branden Grace, Martin Rohwer, Antoine Rozner, Charl Schwartzel
Royal Porthcawl (Note: In May, Royal Porthcawl was announced as a replacement for Burnham & Berrow due to the condition of the course.)	5	Laurie Canter, Oliver Farr, Jazz Janewattananond, Brandon Robinson-Thompson, Matthew Southgate
West Lancashire	5	Kyle Barker, Tiger Christensen (a), Alex Fitzpatrick, Matthew Jordan, Matt Wallace
