= Minor League Golf Tour =

Professional golf tour

- Sport: Golf
- Founded: 2004
- First season: 2004
- Country: Based in Florida
- Most titles: Money list titles: (United States) Steve LeBrun (3)
- Website: http://www.minorleaguegolf.com/

The Minor League Golf Tour is a developmental professional golf tour headquartered in Jupiter, Florida, that runs tournaments year-round in south Florida. The tour runs a year-round event schedule with a combination of one-day, two-day, and three-day tournament formats.

== History ==
The Minor League Golf Tour was founded in 2004.

== Alumni ==
According to the tour, 77 players that had played on the Minor League Golf Tour had status on The PGA Tour or Web.com Tour in 2019. Minor League Golf Tour Alumni include Brooks Koepka and Lexi Thompson.

== Q-School contests ==
The Minor League Golf Tour Q-School contests give players the opportunity to earn PGA, Web.com, or Champions Tour status by winning events that create a similar atmosphere to Qualifying School. In April 2009 The Minor League Golf Tour offered to pay the entry to PGA Tour Qualifying School to the leading money winner of a series of events. Brett Bergeron and Justin Peters won the 2009 contests, with Peters going on to earn conditional Nationwide Tour status for 2010. Justin Peters has a tour record 28 victories. The contest winners for 2010 included golf instructor Jim McLean's son Jon McLean, Steve LeBrun, Dustin Cone, Brian Anderson, and Sunny Kim.

== Money list winners ==
Year	Winner	Prize money (US$)
2024	(United States) Brett Stegmaier	64,959
2023	(Colombia) Ricardo Celia	39,439
2022	(United States) Ryan Linton	34,964
2021	(United States) Josh Hart	33,738
2020	(United States) Luke Graboyes	29,396
2019	(United States) Eric Cole	37,206
2018	(South Korea) Sunny Kim (2)	37,993
2017	(United States) Justin Hicks (2)	49,235
2016	(United States) Brandon Smith (a)	42,103
2015	(United States) Dan McCarthy (2)	26,217
2014	(United States) Jimmy Lytle (2)	26,317
2013	(United States) Dan McCarthy	44,258
2012	(South Korea) Sunny Kim	54,819
2011	(United States) Steve LeBrun (3)	28,574
2010	(United States) Steve LeBrun (2)	41,348
2009	(United States) Jimmy Lytle	30,210
2008	(United States) Steve LeBrun	21,681
2007	(United States) Richard Terga	30,276
2006	(United States) Justin Hicks	9,361
2005	(United States) Adam Armagost	5,060
2004	(United States) Mike McNerney	2,026
