= Braden Shattuck =

American professional golfer (born 1995)

Braden Shattuck (born c. 1994) is an American professional golfer. Shattuck made the cut along with Jeremy Wells, and was the low club pro, at the 2024 PGA Championship.

Shattuck won the 2023 PGA Professional Championship and was the Philadelphia PGA Player of the Year in 2022 and 2023. He also competed in the 2023 PGA Championship.

== Professional wins ==
- 2018 New England Open
- 2023 PGA Professional Championship
- 2025 Philadelphia PGA Championship
- 2026 Philadelphia PGA Championship
