= Jeremy Wells (golfer) =

American professional golfer

Jeremy Wells (born August 14, 1990) is an American professional golfer. He made the cut at the 2024 PGA Championship along with Braden Shattuck and is the director of instruction at Cypress Lake Golf Club in Fort Myers, Florida.

From 2020 onward, he played in PGA club pro tournaments, winning the 2020 South Florida PGA Assistant Professional Championship. In addition to the 2024 tournament, he competed at the 2023 PGA Championship.
