= Chris Starkjohann =

American professional golfer (born 1956)

Personal information
- Nationality: United States
- Born: June 30, 1956 (age 70) Fort Worth, Texas
- Height: 5 ft 11 in (1.80 m)
- Weight: 185 lb (84 kg; 13.2 st)

Career
- Sport: Golf
- College: Eastern Wyoming College
- Turned professional: 1976
- Former tours: Nationwide Tour; Champions Tour
- Professional wins: 10

Number of wins by tour
- Korn Ferry Tour: 1
- Other: 9

Best results in major championships
- Masters Tournament: DNP
- PGA Championship: CUT: 1993, 2005, 2009
- U.S. Open: DNP
- The Open Championship: DNP

Chris Starkjohann (born June 30, 1956) is an American professional golfer who played on the Nationwide Tour and the Champions Tour.

== Career ==
Starkjohann joined the Nationwide Tour in 1993. He only played in two events on the Nationwide Tour between 1994 and 1997 and then rejoined the Tour in 1998. In 1998, he only made two of thirteen cuts but won the Nike St. Louis Golf Classic. He continued to play on the Nationwide Tour until 2005 but didn't play in many events. He joined the Champions Tour in 2006, earning his Tour card through qualifying school. He only played in four events from 2007 to 2008 but rejoined the Tour in 2009 after going through qualifying school for a second time. His highlight on the Champions Tour came in 2009 at the Senior PGA Championship where he finished in a tie for fifth.

Starkjohann was a member of the United States PGA Cup team that defeated Great Britain & Ireland 13½ to 12½ in 2007.

Starkjohann currently works at the Carlsbad Golf Center in Carlsbad, California as in instructor. He worked at the Pala Mesa Golf Club in Fallbrook, California from 1984 to 1993 and has worked at several courses throughout the San Diego area.

== Awards and honors ==
- In 2006, 2007, and 2009, he was named the PGA National Senior Player of the Year
- Starkjohann has been named Southern California PGA Section Player of the Year six times
- He has been named Southern California PGA Section Senior Player of the Year twice
- Starkjohann has been named the PGA San Diego Chapter Player of the Year five times

== Professional wins (10) ==
=== Nike Tour wins (1) ===
No.	Date	Tournament	Winning score	Margin of victory	Runner-up
1	Jul 19, 1998	Nike St. Louis Golf Classic	−17 (69-67-64-63=263)	1 stroke	(United States) Notah Begay III

=== Other wins (9) ===
- 1991 TPS Championship, Southern California PGA Championship
- 2002 San Diego County Open
- 2004 TPS Championship, Southern California PGA Championship
- 2007 TPS Championship
- 2009 TPS Championship
- 2010 Southern California PGA Championship
- 2012 Southern California PGA Championship

== Results in major championships ==
Tournament	1993	1994	1995	1996	1997	1998	1999	2000	2001	2002	2003	2004	2005	2006	2007	2008	2009
PGA Championship	CUT												CUT				CUT

Did not play

CUT = missed the half-way cut
Note: Starkjohann only played in the PGA Championship.

== U.S. national team appearances ==
- PGA Cup: 2007 (winners)
