= Wyatt Worthington II =

American golfer

Personal information
- Nationality: United States
- Born: 1987 (age 38–39)
- Height: 6 ft 0 in (1.83 m)
- Weight: 155 lb (70 kg; 11.1 st)

Career
- Sport: Golf
- Turned professional: 2011

Best results in major championships
- Masters Tournament: DNP
- PGA Championship: CUT: 2016, 2022, 2023, 2024
- U.S. Open: DNP
- The Open Championship: DNP

Wyatt Worthington II (born 1987) is an American professional golfer.

Worthington is from Reynoldsburg, Ohio and works in Gahanna, Ohio.

Worthington is a graduate of Groveport Madison High School and Methodist University.

Worthington qualified for the 2016 PGA Championship by finishing sixth at the 2016 PGA Club Professional Championship, becoming the second African American qualifier for the PGA Championship via that route. The previous African American qualifier was Tom Woodard at the 1991 PGA Championship. Worthington II also played his way into the 2022, 2023, and 2024 PGA Championships as well.

== Results in major championships ==
Tournament	2016	2017	2018	2019	2020	2021	2022	2023	2024
PGA Championship	CUT						CUT	CUT	CUT

Did not play

CUT = missed the half-way cut
Note: Worthington only played in the PGA Championship.

== U.S. national team appearances ==
- PGA Cup: 2022 (winners)
