= Brad Marek =

American professional golfer

Brad Marek (born c.1983) is an American professional golfer.

== Amateur career ==
He competed at John Hersey High School and as a scholarship golfer for the Indiana Hoosiers. He won the Illinois State Junior Amateur in 2002 and the Illinois State Amateur in 2005. While at Indiana, he was a three time Academic All-American.

== Professional career ==
Marek completed on lower-level professional golf tours for nine years securing a total of 15 wins.

After ending his touring career, Marek earned his PGA of America Class A certification in 2019. He made the cut at the 2021 PGA Championship, his first PGA Championship appearance, and finished T78. Marek is a member of the Northern California section of the PGA.

== Professional wins (3) ==
=== Dakotas Tour (2) ===
- 2015 South Dakota Open Pro-Am
- 2018 Marshall Open

=== Other wins (1) ===
- 2024 Northern California PGA Championship
