= Mark Hubbard (golfer) =

American professional golfer (born 1989)

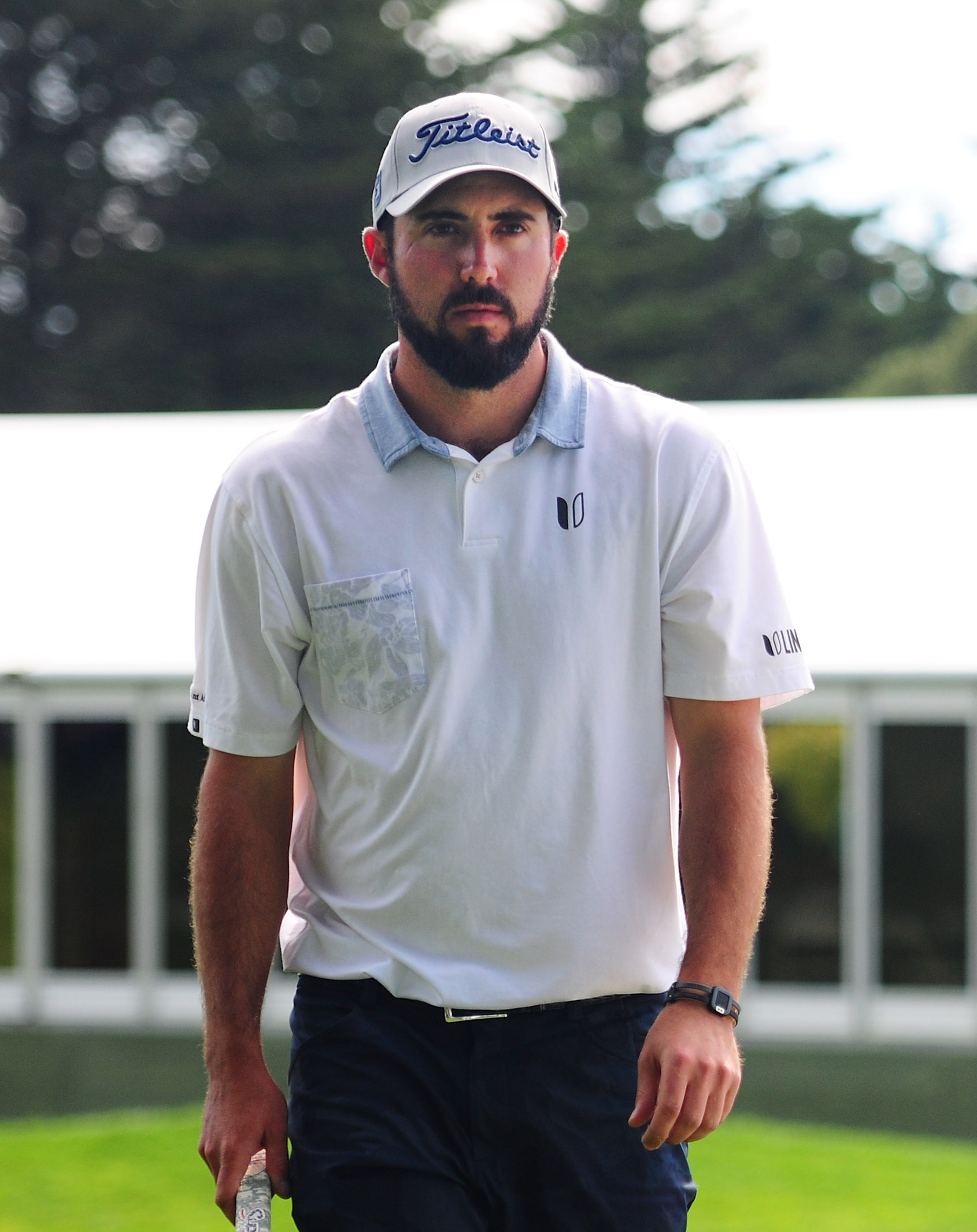
- Hubbard at the 2016 AT&T Pebble Beach Pro-Am

Personal information
- Nickname: Homeless Hubbs
- Nationality: United States
- Born: May 24, 1989 (age 37) Denver, Colorado, U.S.
- Height: 6 ft 0 in (183 cm)
- Weight: 175 lb (79 kg)
- Spouse: Meghan

Career
- Sport: Golf
- College: San Jose State University
- Turned professional: 2012
- Current tour: PGA Tour
- Former tours: Korn Ferry Tour; PGA Tour Canada; Gateway Tour
- Professional wins: 4
- Highest ranking: 66 (February 4, 2024) (as of October 25, 2026)

Number of wins by tour
- Korn Ferry Tour: 1
- Other: 3

Best results in major championships
- Masters Tournament: DNP
- PGA Championship: T26: 2024
- U.S. Open: T50: 2024
- The Open Championship: DNP

Mark Hubbard (born May 24, 1989) is an American professional golfer.

== College career ==
Hubbard played golf for San Jose State University from 2007 to 2011. A 2009 first-team all-Western Athletic Conference (WAC) honoree, he twice qualified for the NCAA Division I Men's Golf Championship, in 2009 and 2011. As a senior in 2011, he finished first in the WAC championship tournament. He graduated from San Jose State in December 2011 with a B.S. in business management.

== Professional career ==
Hubbard turned professional in 2012.

In September 2013, Hubbard won his first PGA Tour Canada event at The Wildfire Invitational. He finished the season ranked third on the Order of Merit, securing him one of five Web.com Tour cards for the 2014 season.

In his first season on the Web.com Tour, Hubbard had six top-10 finishes including a runner-up to Greg Owen at the United Leasing Championship. He finished 18th on the regular-season money list and secured his first PGA Tour card.

During his first season on the PGA Tour, Hubbard made 15 out of 25 cuts but only had a best finish of T20. He lost his card after finishing 164th in the FedEx Cup, but regained it in the Web.com Tour Finals. Hubbard had a better season in 2016, making 21 out of 30 cuts; he finished 115th in the FedEx Cup, retaining his card. In 2017 Hubbard finished 184th in the standings and lost his card, requiring him to go back to the Web.com Tour.

In 2019, Hubbard earned his first win on the Web.com Tour at the LECOM Suncoast Classic, and went on to regain his PGA Tour card by finishing ninth on the regular-season money list.

During the 2022 season, Hubbard showed more consistent form, making 16 cuts in 22 events and posting two top-10s. He retained his card by finishing 100th in the FedEx Cup. In 2023, Hubbard had his best season to date on the PGA Tour. He made the cut in 22 events, with twelve top-25s and six top-10s. Hubbard made the FedEx Cup playoffs and finished 67th in the rankings.

On June 3, 2024 Mark Hubbard shot a 36-hole score of 127 (15-under par) to earn medalist honors at the Cherry Hill Club, Ridgeway, Ontario, Canada U.S. Open sectional qualifier, earning him a spot in the 2024 U.S. Open.

== Personal life ==
Born in Denver, Colorado, Hubbard graduated from Colorado Academy in 2007.

He is the brother of former Ticketmaster CEO Nathan Hubbard.

In 2015, Hubbard proposed to his girlfriend of seven years, Meghan, on the 18th green at Pebble Beach, after completing his first round of the AT&T Pebble Beach Pro-Am. They were married in 2017 and now have two daughters.

== Amateur wins ==
- 2010 Mark Simpson Colorado Invitational
- 2011 WAC Championship

== Professional wins (4) ==
=== Korn Ferry Tour wins (1) ===
No.	Date	Tournament	Winning score	To par	Margin of victory	Runner-up
1	Feb 17, 2019	LECOM Suncoast Classic	65-66-64-67=262	−26	2 strokes	(United States) Maverick McNealy

=== PGA Tour Canada wins (1) ===
No.	Date	Tournament	Winning score	To par	Margin of victory	Runners-up
1	Sep 1, 2013	Wildfire Invitational	68-65-65-66=264	−20	2 strokes	(Canada) Mackenzie Hughes, (United States) Kyle Stough

=== Gateway Tour wins (1) ===
- 2013 National Series 8

=== Golden State Tour wins (1) ===
- 2011 Twin Oaks Championship

== Results in major championships ==
Results not in chronological order in 2020.

Tournament	2020	2021	2022	2023	2024	2025
Masters Tournament						
PGA Championship	T51			75	T26	
U.S. Open	CUT				T50	CUT
The Open Championship	NT					

Did not play

CUT = missed the half-way cut
"T" = tied
NT = no tournament due to COVID-19 pandemic

== Results in The Players Championship ==
Tournament	2017	2018	2019	2020	2021	2022	2023	2024	2025	2026
The Players Championship	CUT			C	CUT		T35	T31	CUT	CUT

CUT = missed the halfway cut
"T" = tied
C = canceled after the first round due to the COVID-19 pandemic

== See also ==
- 2014 Web.com Tour Finals graduates
- 2015 Web.com Tour Finals graduates
- 2019 Korn Ferry Tour Finals graduates
