= Eric Cole (golfer) =

American professional golfer (born 1988)

Personal information
- Full name: Eric James Cole
- Nationality: United States
- Born: June 12, 1988 (age 38) Palm Springs, California, U.S.
- Height: 5 ft 9 in (1.75 m)
- Weight: 155 lb (70 kg; 11.1 st)

Career
- Sport: Golf
- College: Nova Southeastern University
- Turned professional: 2009
- Current tour: PGA Tour
- Former tours: Korn Ferry Tour; Minor League Golf Tour
- Professional wins: 12
- Highest ranking: 36 (February 25, 2024) (as of October 25, 2026)

Best results in major championships
- Masters Tournament: 52nd: 2024
- PGA Championship: T15: 2023
- U.S. Open: T39: 2023
- The Open Championship: T31: 2024

Achievements and awards
- Minor League Golf Tour money list winner: 2019
- PGA Tour Rookie of the Year: 2022–23

Eric James Cole (born June 12, 1988) is an American professional golfer who plays on the PGA Tour. He was awarded the 2022–23 PGA Tour Rookie of the Year. He is the son of professional golfers Bobby Cole and Laura Baugh.

== Early life and amateur career ==
Cole was born on June 12, 1988, the year after his parents remarried, two years after their divorce, as one of seven siblings. With both parents being tour golfers, Cole grew up on golf courses and started playing seriously at age 11. He never had other coaches than his parents.

At age 14, while playing high school golf, Cole became a friend of Sam Saunders, the grandson of Arnold Palmer. Cole also got to know Palmer and the three of them played golf at Palmer's home clubs, Bay Hill Club and Lodge in Florida and Latrobe Country Club in Pennsylvania. In later years, Cole also caddied for Saunders at the Arnold Palmer Invitational on the PGA Tour.

== Professional career ==
He won 56 times on the Minor League Golf Tour including winning the tour championship in 2009 and 2021.

Cole earned his Korn Ferry Tour card in 2017 and played in eight events, making two cuts. His best finish was a tie for 39th place. He returned to the Korn Ferry Tour for the 2021 season and made 31 starts. His first top-10 finish came at the Savannah Golf Championship in October 2020, where he finished tied for third. He had five top-10s in the 2022 season, including two third-place finishes.

Cole qualified for the 2021 U.S. Open at Torrey Pines Golf Course, where he missed the cut after rounds of 77-73.

Cole finished tied for third in the 2022 Korn Ferry Tour Championship to earn his PGA Tour card for the 2023 season. In February, he finished tied with Chris Kirk atop the leaderboard of the Honda Classic before Kirk won with a birdie on the first playoff hole. He was voted as the PGA Tour Rookie of the Year for the 2022–23 season. At 35 years of age, Cole became the second oldest player to receive this award since its inception in 1990. Only Todd Hamilton, at 38 in 2004, had been older.

== Personal life ==
Cole is the son of Bobby Cole, who won the Buick Open on the 1977 PGA Tour and had three top-10 finishes in major championships. In 1966, Cole's father, 18 years old, became the youngest winner ever of the British Amateur. Cole's mother, Laura Baugh, was the 1971 U.S. Women's Amateur champion, the youngest winner ever at 16 years old, and the 1973 LPGA Rookie of the Year.

== Professional wins (12) ==
=== Minor League Golf Tour wins (12) ===
No.	Date	Tournament	Winning score	Margin of victory	Runner(s)-up
1	Aug 28, 2009	Quail Ridge 2-Day	−12 (67-65=132)	3 strokes	(United States) Matthew Abbott
2	Dec 16, 2009	MLGT Tour Championship	−7 (71-66=137)	1 stroke	(United States) Johnny Bloomfield, (United States) Steve LeBrun
3	Apr 27, 2011	Abacoa 2-Day	−4 (73-67=140)	1 stroke	(United States) Derek Fathauer, (United States) Nick Latimer
4	Aug 6, 2015	3-Day Abacoa	−12 (66-71-67=204)	1 stroke	(United States) Carl McCauley
5	Nov 18, 2016	Match Play Championship	2 and 1		(United States) Hernan Borja
6	Jun 13, 2019	Monday Qualifier Contest #5	−15 (67-49-65=181)*	7 strokes	(United States) Nick Latimer, (Colombia) Jesús Rivas
7	Sep 12, 2019	The Falls CC 2-Day	−13 (67-64=131)	1 stroke	(United States) Tom Lovelady
8	Sep 19, 2019	Qualifying School Contest #5	−10 (66-66=132)	3 strokes	(United States) Hernan Borja
9	Oct 10, 2019	Monday Qualifier Contest #8	−15 (67-67-67=132)	4 strokes	(United States) Justin Bryant
10	Oct 30, 2019	Joey D Golf Match Play Championship	2 and 1		(United States) Blake Morris
11	Dec 8, 2021	MLGT Tour Championship (2)	−13 (63-66=129)	1 stroke	(England) Ben Taylor
12	Apr 5, 2023	Palm Beach County Open	−18 (66-63-66=195)	3 strokes	(United States) Chris Wiatr

*Note: The 2019 Monday Qualifier Contest #5 was shortened to 49 holes due to rain.

== Playoff record ==
PGA Tour playoff record (0–2)

No.	Year	Tournament	Opponent	Result
1	2023	The Honda Classic	(United States) Chris Kirk	Lost to birdie on first extra hole
2	2026	Charles Schwab Challenge	(United States) Russell Henley	Lost to birdie on first extra hole

== Results in major championships ==
Tournament	2021	2022	2023	2024	2025	2026
Masters Tournament				52		
PGA Championship			T15	CUT	T41	
U.S. Open	CUT		T39	CUT	CUT	
The Open Championship				T31		T53

Did not play

CUT = missed the half-way cut
"T" indicates a tie for a place

== Results in The Players Championship ==
Tournament	2023	2024	2025	2026
The Players Championship	T27	CUT	CUT	T32

CUT = missed the halfway cut
"T" indicates a tie for a place

== See also ==
- 2022 Korn Ferry Tour Finals graduates
