= Lee Hodges (golfer) =

American professional golfer (born 1995)

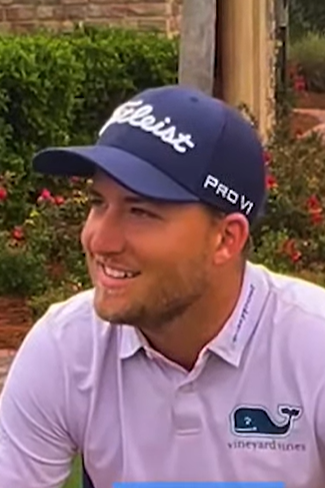

Personal information
- Nationality: United States
- Born: June 14, 1995 (age 31) Huntsville, Alabama, U.S.
- Height: 6 ft 0 in (183 cm)
- Weight: 187 lb (85 kg)
- Spouse: Savannah Rae Kennedy (m. 2021)

Career
- Sport: Golf
- College: University of Alabama at Birmingham; University of Alabama
- Turned professional: 2018
- Current tour: PGA Tour
- Former tours: Korn Ferry Tour; PGA Tour Canada
- Professional wins: 2
- Highest ranking: 52 (September 10, 2023) (as of October 25, 2026)

Number of wins by tour
- PGA Tour: 1
- Korn Ferry Tour: 1

Best results in major championships
- Masters Tournament: CUT: 2024
- PGA Championship: T12: 2024
- U.S. Open: CUT: 2020
- The Open Championship: CUT: 2023

Lee Hodges (born June 14, 1995) is an American professional golfer who plays on the PGA Tour. He claimed his breakthrough win on the PGA Tour at the 3M Open in July 2023.

== Amateur career ==
As a senior at Ardmore High School in 2014, Hodges won the Alabama 4A individual state championship.

Hodges spent two years at the University of Alabama at Birmingham and was named to the All-Conference USA first team both seasons, as well as winning the conference Freshman of the Year in 2015. After the 2015–16 season, he transferred to the University of Alabama and played there for the 2016–17 and 2017–18 seasons. As a senior, he won twice and was named to the All-SEC first team and Ping All-America third team, alongside Alabama teammate Davis Riley in both cases, as the team finished second at the 2018 NCAA Division I championship.

== Professional career ==
In March 2018, while still in college, Hodges competed in a qualifying tournament for PGA Tour Canada. He tied for 28th, earning membership but no guaranteed starts.

Hodges turned pro after the NCAA championship. In late June, he Monday qualified for the Lethbridge Paradise Canyon Open on PGA Tour Canada and finished in a tie for 12th. This gave him access into further events; after finishing third at the Staal Foundation Open and second at the ATB Financial Classic, he placed 15th on the tour's money list. Because of this, he was allowed to enter the Korn Ferry Tour qualifying tournament at the second stage, from which he advanced to the final stage with a tie for third. At final stage he tied for 50th, one stroke short of earning eight guaranteed starts but enough to get into some of the early events.

Hodges opened the 2019 Korn Ferry Tour season with a tie for 16th at The Bahamas Great Exuma Classic and was able to play in most of the remaining events. Entering the final week of the regular season, he was 92nd on the points list, but a season-best tie for seventh at the WinCo Foods Portland Open moved him to 73rd. Finishing in the top 75 made him eligible for the Korn Ferry Tour Finals and gave him fully-exempt status on the Korn Ferry Tour in 2020.

In 2020, Hodges had five top-10 finishes, culminating with a win at the Portland Open which moved him to third on the points list, but due to the COVID-19 pandemic there was no graduating class in 2020 and the season extended into 2021. However, his play on the Korn Ferry Tour did make him eligible for opposite-field PGA Tour events in 2021 as well as the 2020 U.S. Open. At the conclusion of the 2020–21 Korn Ferry Tour regular season, Hodges was 10th in points, thus graduating to the PGA Tour for 2021–22.

Hodges' best finish as a PGA Tour rookie was a tie for third at The American Express, where he co-led at the 54 hole mark. Aided by three other top-25 finishes, he retained his card and entered the 2022 FedEx Cup Playoffs 99th in points after the removal of LIV Golf players. He tied for 13th at the opening playoff event (the FedEx St. Jude Championship) but fell eight points short of moving into the top 70 and advancing to the second event.

In July 2023, Hodges claimed his first PGA Tour win at the 3M Open. He won wire-to-wire, winning by seven shots.

== Amateur wins ==
- 2014 Alabama 4A State Championship
- 2017 Desert Mountain Intercollegiate
- 2018 Puerto Rico Classic, Linger Longer Invitational

== Professional wins (2) ==
=== PGA Tour wins (1) ===
No.	Date	Tournament	Winning score	Margin of victory	Runners-up
1	Jul 30, 2023	3M Open	−24 (63-64-66-67=260)	7 strokes	(Scotland) Martin Laird, (United States) J. T. Poston, (United States) Kevin Streelman

=== Korn Ferry Tour wins (1) ===
Legend
Championship Series (1)
Other Korn Ferry Tour (0)

No.	Date	Tournament	Winning score	Margin of victory	Runners-up
1	Aug 9, 2020	WinCo Foods Portland Open	−11 (70-64-68-71=273)	2 strokes	(France) Paul Barjon, (United States) David Lipsky, (United States) Chad Ramey, (China) Yuan Yechun

== Results in major championships ==
Tournament	2020	2021	2022	2023	2024	2025
Masters Tournament					CUT	
PGA Championship				T55	T12	CUT
U.S. Open	CUT					
The Open Championship	NT			CUT		

Did not play

CUT = missed the half-way cut
"T" = tied
NT = No tournament due to the COVID-19 pandemic

== Results in The Players Championship ==
Tournament	2022	2023	2024	2025	2026
The Players Championship	70	CUT	T35		T59

Did not play

CUT = missed the halfway cut
"T" indicates a tie for a place

== See also ==
- 2021 Korn Ferry Tour Finals graduates
