= Golf at the 2018 Asian Games =

- Venue: Pondok Indah Golf Course
- Dates: 23–26 August
- Competitors: 128 from 25 nations

Golf at the 2018 Asian Games was held at Pondok Indah Golf Course, Jakarta, Indonesia, from 23 to 26 August 2018 and featured four events: the men's individual and team events and women's individual and team events.

The event was open to amateur players only. Several national golf associations complained to the Court of Arbitration for Sport that Sri Lanka, Bangladesh, Macau and Uzbekistan had possibly entered professional golfers, but the CAS ruled that none of the players were professional.

== Schedule ==
R1	Round 1	R2	Round 2	R3	Round 3	FR	Final round

Event↓/Date →	23 Thu	24 Fri	25 Sat	26 Sun
Men's individual	R1	R2	R3	FR
Women's individual	R1	R2	R3	FR
Men's team	R1	R2	R3	FR
Women's team	R1	R2	R3	FR

== Medal summary ==
=== Medal table ===
Rank	Nation	Gold	Silver	Bronze	Total
1	Philippines	2	0	1	3
2	Japan	2	0	0	2
3	China	0	2	2	4
4	South Korea	0	2	1	3
Totals (4 entries)		4	4	4	12

=== Medalists ===
Event	Gold	Silver	Bronze
Men's individual	Keita Nakajima; Japan	Oh Seung-taek; South Korea	Jin Cheng; China
Men's team	Japan; Keita Nakajima; Ren Yonezawa; Daiki Imano; Takumi Kanaya	China; Jin Cheng; Chen Yilong; Zhang Huachuang; Yuan Yechun	South Korea; Kim Dong-min; Oh Seung-taek; Jang Seung-bo; Choi Ho-young
Women's individual	Yuka Saso; Philippines	Liu Wenbo; China	Bianca Pagdanganan; Philippines
Women's team	Philippines; Yuka Saso; Bianca Pagdanganan; Lois Kaye Go	South Korea; Ryu Hae-ran; Jeong Yun-ji; Lim Hee-jong	China; Liu Wenbo; Du Mohan; Yin Ruoning

== Participating nations ==
A total of 128 athletes from 25 nations competed in golf at the 2018 Asian Games:

- Bangladesh (6)
- Bhutan (1)
- Brunei (2)
- China (7)
- Chinese Taipei (7)
- Hong Kong (7)
- India (7)
- Indonesia (7)
- Japan (7)
- Kazakhstan (6)
- Lebanon (1)
- Macau (6)
- Malaysia (7)
- Mongolia (7)
- Nepal (4)
- Pakistan (2)
- Philippines (7)
- Qatar (4)
- Singapore (4)
- Sri Lanka (3)
- South Korea (7)
- Thailand (7)
- United Arab Emirates (2)
- Uzbekistan (4)
- Vietnam (6)
