= Golf at the 2022 Asian Games =

- Venue: West Lake International Golf Course
- Dates: 28 September –1 October 2023
- Competitors: 121 from 25 nations

Golf at the 2022 Asian Games was held at West Lake International Golf Course, Hangzhou, China, from 28 September to 1 October 2023 and featured four events: the men's individual and team events and women's individual and team events.

== Schedule ==
R1	Round 1	R2	Round 2	R3	Round 3	FR	Final round

Event↓/Date →	28th Thu	29th Fri	30th Sat	1st Sun
Men's individual	R1	R2	R3	FR
Women's individual	R1	R2	R3	FR
Men's team	R1	R2	R3	FR
Women's team	R1	R2	R3	FR

== Medal summary ==
=== Medal table ===
* Host nation (China)

Rank	Nation	Gold	Silver	Bronze	Total
1	Thailand	2	1	0	3
2	South Korea	1	2	1	4
3	Hong Kong	1	0	1	2
4	India	0	1	0	1
5	China*	0	0	1	1
5	Chinese Taipei	0	0	1	1
Totals (6 entries)		4	4	4	12

=== Medalists ===
Event	Gold	Silver	Bronze
Men's individual	Kho Taichi; Hong Kong	Im Sung-jae; South Korea	Hung Chien-yao; Chinese Taipei
Men's team	South Korea; Kim Si-woo; Jang Yu-bin; Im Sung-jae; Cho Woo-young	Thailand; Phachara Khongwatmai; Atiruj Winaicharoenchai; Danthai Boonma; Poom Saksansin	Hong Kong; Hak Shun-yat; Matthew Cheung Hung-hai; Kho Taichi; Ng Shing Fung
Women's individual	Arpichaya Yubol; Thailand	Aditi Ashok; India	Yoo Hyun-jo; South Korea
Women's team	Thailand; Eila Galitsky; Patcharajutar Kongkraphan; Arpichaya Yubol	South Korea; Yoo Hyun-jo; Lim Ji-yoo; Kim Min-sol	China; Yin Ruoning; Liu Yu; Lin Xiyu

== Participating nations ==
A total of 121 athletes from 25 nations competed in golf at the 2022 Asian Games:

- Bangladesh (2)
- Bhutan (1)
- China (6)
- Chinese Taipei (7)
- Hong Kong (7)
- India (7)
- Jordan (1)
- Japan (7)
- Kazakhstan (7)
- Saudi Arabia (4)
- Kuwait (1)
- Laos (4)
- Macau (4)
- Mongolia (6)
- Nepal (6)
- Pakistan (5)
- Philippines (6)
- Palestine (1)
- Qatar (5)
- Singapore (7)
- Sri Lanka (4)
- South Korea (7)
- Thailand (7)
- United Arab Emirates (2)
- Vietnam (6)
