= Golf at the 2022 Asian Games – Men's individual =

Golf – Men's individual at the 2022 Asian Games
- Venue: West Lake International Golf Course
- Date: 28 September 2023 – 1 October 2023
- Competitors: 82 from 24 nations

Medalists
gold medal	Kho Taichi	Hong Kong
silver medal	Im Sung-jae	South Korea
bronze medal	Hung Chien-yao	Chinese Taipei

The men's individual competition at the 2022 Asian Games in Hangzhou, China was held from 28 September to 1 October 2023 at the West Lake International Golf Course.

== Schedule ==
All times are China Standard Time (UTC+08:00)

Date	Time	Event
Saturday, 28 September 2023	10:30	Round 1
Sunday, 29 September 2023	10:30	Round 2
Monday, 30 September 2023	10:00	Round 3
Tuesday, 1 October 2023	07:30	Round 4

== Results ==
Rank	Athlete	Round				Total	To par
Rank	Athlete	1	2	3	4	Total	To par
1st place, gold medalist(s)	Kho Taichi (HKG)	62	60	70	69	261	−27
2nd place, silver medalist(s)	Im Sung-jae (KOR)	66	65	66	65	262	−26
3rd place, bronze medalist(s)	Hung Chien-yao (TPE)	65	63	67	69	264	−24
4	Kim Si-woo (KOR)	66	66	68	65	265	−23
5	Jang Yu-bin (KOR)	61	67	68	70	266	−22
T6	Masato Sumiuchi (JPN)	63	71	68	69	271	−17
T6	Cho Woo-young (KOR)	63	67	73	68	271	−17
T8	Chen Guxin (CHN)	63	67	67	75	272	−16
T8	Si Ngai (MAC)	65	70	64	73	272	−16
T10	Clyde Mondilla (PHI)	65	70	68	70	273	−15
T10	Atiruj Winaicharoenchai (THA)	67	63	67	76	273	−15
T12	Anirban Lahiri (IND)	65	67	74	68	274	−14
T12	James Leow (SGP)	64	74	68	68	274	−14
T12	Ryan John Ang (SGP)	66	69	66	73	274	−14
T15	Ding Wenyi (CHN)	70	67	73	65	275	−13
T15	Siddikur Rahman (BAN)	65	72	70	68	275	−13
T17	Danthai Boonma (THA)	70	70	71	65	276	−12
T17	Poom Saksansin (THA)	66	71	68	71	276	−12
T17	Phachara Khongwatmai (THA)	64	71	68	73	276	−12
T17	Matthew Cheung (HKG)	69	66	68	73	276	–12
T21	Koh Dengshan (SGP)	64	74	68	71	277	–11
T21	Wu Ashun (CHN)	68	70	69	70	277	–11
T21	Hak Shun Yat (HKG)	69	68	73	67	277	–11
24	Taichiro Ideriha (JPN)	65	66	73	74	278	–10
T25	Taishi Moto (JPN)	67	69	74	69	279	–9
T25	Yuta Sugiura (JPN)	68	68	72	71	279	–9
T27	Le Khanh Hung (VIE)	70	66	72	73	281	–7
T27	Khalin Hitesh Joshi (IND)	70	69	69	73	281	–7
29	Shiv Chawrasia (IND)	67	72	68	75	282	–6
T30	Su Ching-hung (TPE)	69	65	73	76	283	–5
T30	Nguyễn Anh Minh (VIE)	68	72	70	73	283	–5
32	Shubhankar Sharma (IND)	68	69	76	73	286	–2
33	Carl Jano Corpus (PHI)	71	68	72	76	287	–1
T34	Thammasack Bouahom (LAO)	73	68	71	76	295	E
T34	Jamal Hossain (BAN)	71	72	75	70	296	E
T34	Thangaraja Nadaraja (SRI)	70	71	75	72	288	E
T37	Wang Wei-hsuan (TPE)	69	71	73	76	289	+1
T37	Ira Christian Alido (PHI)	72	71	71	75	289	+1
39	Gregory Raymund Foo Yongen (SGP)	71	70	75	77	293	+5
40	Ma Kaijun (MAC)	69	74	78	75	296	+8
T42	Othman Almulla (KSA)	74	70			144	E
T42	Aidric Chan (PHI)	71	73			144	E
T42	Subash Tamang (NEP)	72	72			144	E
T45	Ali Al-Shahrani (QAT)	70	75			145	+1
T45	Anura Rohana (SRI)	71	74			145	+1
T45	Mithun Perera (SRI)	72	73			145	+1
T48	Faisal Salhab (KSA)	74	72			146	+2
T48	Nguyễn Đặng Minh (VIE)	71	75			146	+2
T48	Sadbhav Acharya (NEP)	71	75			146	+2
T48	Salman Jehangir (PAK)	72	74			146	+2
T52	Saud Al Sharif (KSA)	74	73			147	+3
T52	Yeh Yu-chen (TPE)	73	74			147	+3
T52	Hun Pui In (MAC)	74	73			147	+3
55	Ng Shing Fung (HKG)	71	77			148	+4
T56	Nguyễn Nhất Long (VIE)	71	78			149	+5
T56	Saleh Ali Alkaabi (QAT)	73	76			149	+5
T56	Thammalack Bouhaom (LAO)	72	77			149	+5
T59	Ali Hassan Al-Sakha (KSA)	79	71			150	+6
T59	Kandasamy Prabagaran (SRI)	72	78			150	+6
T59	Qasim Ali Khan (PAK)	73	77			150	+6
T62	Ahmad Skaik (UAE)	73	78			151	+7
T62	Abdulrahman Al-Shahrani (QAT)	76	75			151	+7
T62	Chanpasit Ounaphom (LAO)	78	73			151	+7
T65	Yuvaraj Bhujel (NEP)	74	81			155	+11
T65	Joseph Easmeil (PLE)	74	81			155	+11
T67	Omar Khalid Hussain (PAK)	81	75			156	+12
T67	Mousa Shana'ah (JOR)	80	76			156	+12
T69	Marat Bagtzhanov (KAZ)	78	80			158	+14
T69	Phongsavath Duangvilaykeo (LAO)	77	81			158	+14
T69	Tshendra Dorji (BHU)	80	78			158	+14
72	Kassiyet Dyussenbayev (KAZ)	81	80			161	+17
T73	Bakhtiyar Abdulin (KAZ)	78	84			162	+18
T73	Mohammed Skaik (UAE)	84	78			162	+18
75	Rashid Al Jassmy (UAE)	80	83			163	+19
76	Altaibaatar Batsaikhan (MGL)	84	85			169	+25
T77	Bat-Amgalan Chinbat (MGL)	88	84			172	+28
T77	Salem Al-Abkal (KUW)	85	87			172	+28
T79	Margad Jambaldorj (MGL)	89	84			173	+29
T79	Anarbat Jargalsaikhan (MGL)	89	84			173	+29
81	Abdulaziz Al Muhanadi (QAT)	90	84			174	+30
82	Sherkhan Sugur (KAZ)	90	85			174	+31
	Sukra Bahadur Rai (NEP)	70	69	WD			
