= Golf at the 2018 Asian Games – Men's individual =

Golf – Men's individual at the 2018 Asian Games
- Venue: Pondok Indah Golf & Country Club
- Date: 23 August 2018 – 26 August 2018
- Competitors: 86 from 25 nations

Medalists
gold medal	Keita Nakajima	Japan
silver medal	Oh Seung-taek	South Korea
bronze medal	Jin Cheng	China

The men's individual competition at the 2018 Asian Games in Jakarta, Indonesia was held from 23 August to 26 August at the Pondok Indah Golf & Country Club.

== Schedule ==
All times are Western Indonesia Time (UTC+07:00)

Date	Time	Event
Thursday, 23 August 2018	06:00	Round 1
Friday, 24 August 2018	06:00	Round 2
Saturday, 25 August 2018	06:00	Round 3
Sunday, 26 August 2018	06:00	Round 4

== Results ==
Rank	Athlete	Round				Total	To par
Rank	Athlete	1	2	3	4	Total	To par
1st place, gold medalist(s)	Keita Nakajima (JPN)	68	68	70	71	277	−11
2nd place, silver medalist(s)	Oh Seung-taek (KOR)	72	70	67	69	278	−10
3rd place, bronze medalist(s)	Jin Cheng (CHN)	70	72	67	70	279	−9
4	Kevin Yu (TPE)	74	70	67	70	281	−7
4	Takumi Kanaya (JPN)	70	70	73	68	281	−7
6	Sadom Kaewkanjana (THA)	70	70	70	72	282	−6
7	Kosuke Hamamoto (THA)	72	70	70	71	283	−5
8	Gregory Raymund Foo Yongen (SGP)	70	71	71	72	284	−4
8	Daiki Imano (JPN)	73	68	69	74	284	−4
10	Lloyd Jefferson Go (PHI)	74	71	71	69	285	−3
10	Yuan Yechun (CHN)	76	72	65	72	285	−3
10	Choi Ho-young (KOR)	69	68	75	73	285	−3
13	Aadil Bedi (IND)	69	70	74	73	286	−2
13	Naraajie Emerald Ramadhan Putra (INA)	69	72	77	68	286	−2
13	Ruperto Zaragosa III (PHI)	77	73	67	69	286	−2
13	Tayhan John Thomas (IND)	71	69	73	73	286	−2
13	Ren Yonezawa (JPN)	70	71	74	71	286	−2
13	Zhang Huachuang (CHN)	72	73	73	68	286	−2
19	Lin Chuan-tai (TPE)	71	73	70	73	287	−1
20	Witchayanon Chothirunrungrueng (THA)	73	74	71	70	288	E
20	Jonathan Wijono (INA)	75	69	73	71	288	E
20	Abdul Hadi (SGP)	76	69	68	75	288	E
23	Kshitij Naveed Kaul (IND)	73	68	76	72	289	+1
23	Chen Yilong (CHN)	75	75	68	71	289	+1
23	Kim Dong-min (KOR)	75	73	69	72	289	+1
26	Wong Shuai Ming (HKG)	73	72	72	74	291	+3
26	Jang Seung-bo (KOR)	73	71	72	75	291	+3
28	Ervin Chang (MAS)	69	73	71	79	292	+4
29	Vanchai Luangnitikul (THA)	79	69	75	70	293	+5
29	Kevin Caesario Akbar (INA)	75	72	72	74	293	+5
31	Almay Rayhan Yagutah (INA)	73	72	72	77	294	+6
32	Daulet Tuleubayev (KAZ)	74	72	75	74	295	+7
32	Muhammad Afif Bin Mohd Fathi (MAS)	79	68	73	75	295	+7
32	Jonathan Lai (HKG)	77	73	71	74	295	+7
35	Gao Weiwei (PHI)	72	67	77	80	296	+8
36	Hsu Hung-hsuan (TPE)	77	76	67	77	297	+9
37	Si Ngai (MAC)	73	76	76	73	298	+10
37	Taimoor Khan (PAK)	75	76	72	75	298	+10
39	Wang Wei-hsuan (TPE)	75	76	78	70	299	+11
40	Truong Chi Quan (VIE)	71	80	74	75	300	+12
41	Adam Arif Madzri (MAS)	80	75	74	72	301	+13
41	Joseph de Soysa (SRI)	79	73	76	73	301	+13
43	Ng Shing Fung (HKG)	77	73	76	77	303	+15
44	Joshua Ho (SGP)	79	78	73	74	304	+16
44	Rhaasrikanesh Kanavathi (MAS)	74	82	73	75	304	+16
44	Matthew Cheung (HKG)	75	77	76	76	304	+16
47	Sisira Kumara George Patrick (SRI)	73	77	79	77	306	+18
47	Saleh Al Kaabi (QAT)	73	78	77	78	306	+18
47	Ahmad Baig (PAK)	78	76	76	76	306	+18
47	Low Wee Jin (SGP)	75	78	76	77	306	+18
51	Luis Miguel Castro (PHI)	78	71	78	80	307	+19
51	Nguyen Phuong Toan (VIE)	83	79	71	74	307	+19
53	Hari Mohan Singh (IND)	77	73	77	82	309	+21
54	Hun Pui In (MAC)	76	78	80	76	310	+22
55	Ali Al-Shahrani (QAT)	76	81	79	75	311	+23
55	Md Shahab Uddin (BAN)	79	82	75	75	311	+23
57	Awangku Muhd Syakir bin Pengiran Haji Alli (BRU)	78	81	78	76	313	+25
58	Sukra Bahadur Rai (NEP)	81	76	77	81	315	+27
59	Jaham Al-Kuwari (QAT)	85	75	81	75	316	+28
60	Tanka Bahadur Karki (NEP)	82	77	81	77	317	+29
61	Md Shomrat Sikder (BAN)	81	78	79	80	318	+30
61	Ao Ka Hou (MAC)	83	78	84	73	318	+30
61	Mohammad Farhad (BAN)	83	74	80	81	318	+30
61	Md Shafique Bakha (BAN)	80	74	82	82	318	+30
65	Mohd Aritz Maldini bin Haji Abdul Majid (BRU)	78	84	79	78	319	+31
66	Thai Trung Hieu (VIE)	80	78	76	86	320	+32
66	Nguyen Hung Dung (VIE)	81	79	80	80	320	+32
68	Ugen Dorji (BHU)	76	82	84	79	321	+33
69	Abdulrahman Al-Shahrani (QAT)	85	82	75	80	322	+34
69	Kanatbek Kurbanaliev (UZB)	82	83	82	75	322	+34
69	Salim Zein (LBN)	85	77	78	82	322	+34
72	Sachin de Silva (SRI)	74	82	84	83	323	+35
72	Yevgeniy Li (UZB)	78	80	85	80	323	+35
74	Prithvi Malla (NEP)	88	80	79	77	324	+36
74	Roman Ten (UZB)	91	77	77	79	324	+36
76	Xiao Jieyu (MAC)	81	81	80	83	325	+37
77	Adilet Kozhabergen (KAZ)	82	85	83	76	326	+38
78	Ajit B. K. (NEP)	83	80	81	83	327	+39
78	Mohamed Al-Hajeri (UAE)	78	81	82	86	327	+39
80	Boldbaatar Munkhbaatar (MGL)	91	88	83	82	344	+56
81	Sergey Chen (UZB)	91	84	92	81	348	+60
82	Sherkhan Sugur (KAZ)	86	93	86	85	350	+62
83	Adil Mukhamejanov (KAZ)	86	87	82	97	352	+64
84	Gangaa Mendsaikhan (MGL)	93	100	86	89	368	+80
85	Jambaldorj Margad (MGL)	98	91	87	98	374	+86
86	Choijamts Gantumur (MGL)	95	101	99	94	389	+101
