= Saudi Open =

Asian Tour golf tournament

Tournament information
- Location: Riyadh, Saudi Arabia
- Established: 2015
- Courses: Dirab Golf and Country Club
- Par: 72
- Length: 7,280 yards (6,660 m)
- Organized by: Saudi Golf Federation
- Tours: Asian Tour; Asian Development Tour
- Format: Stroke play
- Prize fund: US$1,000,000
- Month played: December

Tournament record score
- Aggregate: 260 John Catlin (2024)
- To par: −24 as above

Current champion
- (Sweden) Björn Hellgren

Location map
- Location in Saudi Arabia

The Saudi Open is a professional golf tournament that is held at Dirab Golf and Country Club in Riyadh, Saudi Arabia. Founded in 2015, it has been an event on the Asian Tour since 2023.

== History ==
The tournament was introduced in December 2015. Othman Al Mulla won the inaugural event, winning again in 2017. Saleh Al-Kaabi won in 2016. Todd Clements won in 2018, beating Jamie Elson by two shots. Jamie Elson won the 2019 event (the fifth edition), beating Ayoub Id-Omar and Ahmed Marjan by two shots. In 2021, Saudi amateur Faisal Salhab won the sixth edition of the Saudi Open.

The inaugural Asian Tour tournament was played in December 2023. 19-year-old Denwit Boriboonsub shot a 7-under-par final round 64 to finish three strokes ahead of Henrik Stenson to win his third tournament in three consecutive weeks.

In 2024, the tournament was moved from December to April. John Catlin was victorious, winning wire-to-wire.

== Winners ==
Year	Tour (Note: ADT – Asian Development Tour; ASA – Asian Tour.)	Winner	Score	To par	Margin of victory	Runner(s)-up	Venue
Saudi Open
2025	ASA	(Sweden) Björn Hellgren	265	−23	1 stroke	(Australia) Jack Thompson	Dirab
2024	ASA	(United States) John Catlin	260	−24	7 strokes	(Australia) Wade Ormsby	Riyadh GC
2023	ASA	(Thailand) Denwit Boriboonsub	266	−18	3 strokes	(Sweden) Henrik Stenson	Riyadh GC
PIF Saudi Open
2022	ADT	(Indonesia) Naraajie Ramadhan Putra	197	−19	3 strokes	(Australia) Harrison Gilbert	Rolling Hills
Saudi Open
2021		(Saudi Arabia) Faisal Salhab (a)	205	−11	5 strokes	(Qatar) Ali Al-Shahrani (a) (Saudi Arabia) Saud Al Sharif (a) (Spain) Gabriel Sanz	Riyadh GC
2020: No tournament
2019		(England) Jamie Elson	210	−6	2 strokes	(Morocco) Ayoub Id-Omar (Morocco) Ahmed Marjan	Dirab
2018		(England) Todd Clements	208	−8	2 strokes	(England) Jamie Elson	Riyadh GC
2017		(Saudi Arabia) Othman Al Mulla (2)	219	+3	10 strokes	(Bahrain) Nasser Yaqoob	Nofa
2016		(Qatar) Saleh Al-Kaabi	218	+2		(Saudi Arabia) Othman Al Mulla	Dirab
2015		(Saudi Arabia) Othman Al Mulla	211	−5	3 strokes	(Qatar) Ali Al-Shahrani (a)	Riyadh GC

== See also ==
- Open golf tournament
- Saudi International (golf)
