= Golf at the 2022 Asian Games – Men's team =

Golf – Men's team at the 2022 Asian Games
- Venue: West Lake International Golf Course
- Date: 28 September 2023 – 1 October 2023
- Competitors: 76 from 20 nations

Medalists
gold medal	South Korea; Kim Si-woo, Jang Yu-bin; Im Sung-jae, Cho Woo-young
silver medal	Thailand; Phachara Khongwatmai, Atiruj Winaicharoenchai; Danthai Boonma, Poom Saksansin
bronze medal	Hong Kong; Hak Shun-yat, Matthew Cheung Hung-hai; Kho Taichi, Ng Shing Fung

The men's individual competition at the 2022 Asian Games in Hangzhou, China was held from 28 September to 1 October 2023 at the West Lake International Golf Course.

== Schedule ==
All times are China Standard Time (UTC+08:00)

Date	Time	Event
Saturday, 28 September 2023	10:30	Round 1
Sunday, 29 September 2023	10:30	Round 2
Monday, 30 September 2023	10:00	Round 3
Tuesday, 1 October 2023	07:30	Round 4

== Results ==
Rank	Team	Round				Total	To par
Rank	Team	1	2	3	4	Total	To par
1st place, gold medalist(s)	South Korea (KOR)	190	198	202	198	788	−76
	Im Sung-jae	66	65	66	65		
	Kim Si-woo	~~66~~	66	68	65		
	Jang Yu-bin	61	~~67~~	68	~~70~~		
	Cho Woo-young	63	67	~~73~~	68		
2nd place, silver medalist(s)	Thailand (THA)	197	204	203	209	813	−51
	Atiruj Winaicharoenchai	67	63	67	~~76~~		
	Danthai Boonma	~~70~~	70	~~71~~	65		
	Poom Saksansin	66	~~71~~	68	71		
	Phachara Khongwatmai	64	71	68	73		
3rd place, bronze medalist(s)	Hong Kong (HKG)	200	194	211	209	814	−50
	Kho Taichi	62	60	70	69		
	Matthew Cheung	69	66	68	73		
	Hak Shun Yat	69	68	73	67		
	Ng Shing Fung	~~71~~	~~77~~	~~80~~	~~78~~		
4	Japan (JPN)	195	203	213	209	820	−44
	Masato Sumiuchi	63	~~71~~	68	69		
	Taichiro Ideriha	65	66	73	~~74~~		
	Taishi Moto	67	69	~~74~~	69		
	Yuta Sugiura	~~68~~	68	72	71		
5	Singapore (SGP)	194	213	202	212	821	−43
	James Leow	64	~~74~~	68	68		
	Ryan John Ang	66	69	66	73		
	Koh Dengshan	64	74	68	71		
	Gregory Raymund Foo Yongen	~~71~~	70	~~75~~	~~77~~		
6	China (CHN)	201	204	209	210	824	−40
	Chen Guxin	63	67	67	75		
	Ding Wenyi	70	67	73	65		
	Wu Ashun	68	70	69	70		
7	India (IND)	200	205	211	214	830	−34
	Anirban Lahiri	65	67	74	68		
	Khalin Hitesh Joshi	~~70~~	69	69	73		
	Shiv Chawrasia	67	~~72~~	68	~~75~~		
	Shubhankar Sharma	68	69	~~76~~	73		
8	Chinese Taipei (TPE)	203	209	211	220	833	−31
	Hung Chien-yao	65	63	67	69		
	Su Ching-hung	69	65	~~73~~	~~76~~		
	Wang Wei-hsuan	69	71	73	76		
	Yeh Yu-chen	~~73~~	~~74~~	71	75		
9	Philippines (PHI)	207	209	210	218	844	−20
	Clyde Mondilla	65	70	68	70		
	Carl Jano Corpus	71	68	~~72~~	~~76~~		
	Ira Christian Alido	~~72~~	71	71	75		
	Aidric Chan	71	~~73~~	71	73		
10	Vietnam (VIE)	209	213	216	223	861	−3
	Lễ Khấnh Hung	70	66	72	73		
	Nguyễn Anh Minh	68	72	70	73		
	Nguyễn Đặng Minh	~~71~~	75	74	77		
	Nguyễn Nhất Long	71	~~78~~	~~75~~	~~78~~		
11	Macau (MAC)	208	217			425	−7
	Si Ngai	65	70				
	Ma Kaijun	69	74				
	Hun Pui In	74	73				
12	Nepal (NEP)	213	216			429	−3
	Subash Tamang	72	72				
	Sadbhav Acharya	71	75				
	Yuvaraj Bhujel	~~74~~	~~81~~				
	Sukra Bahadur Rai	70	69				
13	Sri Lanka (SRI)	213	218			431	−1
	Thangaraja Nadaraja	70	71				
	Anura Rohana	71	74				
	Mithun Perera	~~72~~	73				
	Kandasamy Prabagaran	72	~~78~~				
14	Saudi Arabia (KSA)	222	213			435	+3
	Othman Almulla	74	70				
	Faisal Salhab	74	72				
	Saud Al Sharif	74	~~73~~				
	Ali Hassan Al-Sakha	~~79~~	71				
15	Laos (LAO)	222	218			440	+8
	Thammasack Bouahom	73	68				
	Thammalack Bouhaom	72	77				
	Chanpasit Ounaphom	~~78~~	73				
	Phongsavath Duangvilaykeo	77	~~81~~				
16	Qatar (QAT)	219	226			445	+13
	Ali Al-Shahrani	70	75				
	Saleh Ali Alkaabi	73	76				
	Abdulrahman Al-Shahrani	76	75				
	Abdulaziz Al Muhanadi	~~90~~	~~84~~				
17	Pakistan (PAK)	226	226			452	+20
	Salman Jehangir	72	74				
	Qasim Ali Khan	73	77				
	Omar Khalid Hussain	81	75				
18	United Arab Emirates (UAE)	237	239			476	+44
	Ahmad Skaik	73	78				
	Mohammed Skaik	84	78				
	Rashid Al Jassmy	80	83				
19	Kazakhstan (KAZ)	237	244			481	+49
	Marat Bagtzhanov	78	80				
	Kassiyet Dyussenbayev	81	80				
	Bakhtiyar Abdulin	78	84				
	Sherkhan Sugur	~~90~~	~~85~~				
20	Mongolia (MGL)	261	252			513	+81
	Altaibaatar Batsaikhan	84	~~85~~				
	Bat-Amgalan Chinbat	88	84				
	Anarbat Jargalsaikhan	~~89~~	84				
	Margad Jambaldorj	89	84				
