= Wayne Perske =

Australian professional golfer

Personal information
- Nationality: Australia
- Born: 7 July 1974 (age 52) Brisbane, Queensland, Australia
- Height: 1.83 m (6 ft 0 in)
- Weight: 78 kg (172 lb; 12.3 st)

Career
- Sport: Golf
- Turned professional: 2000
- Former tours: PGA Tour of Australasia; Japan Golf Tour
- Professional wins: 2

Number of wins by tour
- Japan Golf Tour: 1
- Other: 1

Best results in major championships
- Masters Tournament: DNP
- PGA Championship: DNP
- U.S. Open: DNP
- The Open Championship: CUT: 2006

Wayne Perske (born 7 July 1974) is an Australian professional golfer.

== Career ==
Perske played on the PGA Tour of Australasia and the Japan Golf Tour, winning once.

In October 2010, Perske was arrested in Japan for cocaine possession. He was convicted and received an 18-month sentence in prison, suspended for three years.

Following a return to Australia, Perske persisted with golf, using his extensive tour knowledge to craft a teaching career. He held positions at Maleny Golf Club, Golf Central BNE and now teaches and manages at Golf 24, Hendra: an innovative virtual indoor golf facility.

Following years of extensive back surgery, culminating in a total of four spinal fusions, Perske was deemed eligible to compete again in All Abilities tournaments for the year of 2024.

In his opening tournament at Cobram Barooga Golf Club, he bested the field and won by seven shots.

== Amateur wins ==
- 1998 Keperra Bowl
- 1999 Eastern Amateur
- 2000 Keperra Bowl

== Professional wins (2) ==
=== Japan Golf Tour wins (1) ===
No.	Date	Tournament	Winning score	Margin of victory	Runners-up
1	16 Apr 2006	Token Homemate Cup	−21 (64-67-69-67=267)	2 strokes	(Australia) Brendan Jones, (Japan) Yui Ueda

=== Australasian Development Tour wins (1) ===
No.	Date	Tournament	Winning score	Margin of victory	Runners-up
1	7 Oct 2000	Eastern Australia Airlines Big Sky Country Open	−16 (65-69-69-69=272)	1 stroke	(Australia) Paul Marantz, (Australia) Andre Stolz

== Results in major championships ==
Tournament	2006
The Open Championship	CUT

CUT = missed the halfway cut
Note: Perske only played in The Open Championship.

== Team appearances ==
Amateur

- Nomura Cup (representing Australia): 1999 (winners)
- Australian Men's Interstate Teams Matches (representing Queensland): 1997, 1998, 1999
- Southern Cross Championship (representing Australia): 1999 (winners)
