= Yuta Sugiura =

Japanese professional golfer (born 2001)

Personal information
- Nationality: Japan
- Born: 12 September 2001 (age 25) Takahama, Aichi Prefecture, Japan
- Height: 1.72 m (5 ft 8 in)
- Weight: 74 kg (163 lb; 11.7 st)

Career
- Sport: Golf
- College: Nihon University
- Turned professional: 2023
- Current tours: Korn Ferry Tour; Japan Golf Tour
- Professional wins: 5

Number of wins by tour
- Japan Golf Tour: 3
- Korn Ferry Tour: 1
- Other: 1

Best results in major championships
- Masters Tournament: DNP
- PGA Championship: DNP
- U.S. Open: CUT: 2025
- The Open Championship: DNP

Achievements and awards
- Japan Golf Tour Rookie of the Year: 2025

Yuta Sugiura (杉浦 悠太, Sugiura Yuta; born 12 September 2001) is a Japanese professional golfer who plays on the Korn Ferry Tour, where he claimed his first win at the 2026 AdventHealth Championship. He also plays on the Japan Golf Tour where he has three victories and was the 2025 Rookie of the Year.

== Amateur career ==
Sugiura was born in Takahama, Aichi Prefecture. He graduated from Fukui Institute of Technology High School, before attending Nihon University from 2020 to 2023.

In 2018, Sugiura won the Japan Junior Championship. He finished 4th at the 2020 Australian Master of the Amateurs, six strokes behind winner Sahith Theegala.

He played an active role on the national team, and won the 2022 Nomura Cup in the Philippines, both with the team and individually. His team finished 4th at the 2022 Asian Games.

Sugiura tied for 3rd at the 2022 Japan Open Golf Championship. In 2023, his final year at university, he won the Japan Challenge Tour's Dunlop Phoenix Challenge, which earned him a spot in the 50th Dunlop Phoenix Tournament, where he became the seventh amateur to win on the Japan Golf Tour, winning by three strokes after starting the day a stroke behind overnight leader Hideki Matsuyama.

== Professional career ==
Sugiura turned professional the day after he won the Dunlop Phoenix Tournament in November 2023 and joined the Japan Golf Tour. In 2024, he won the Japan PGA Championship in his first appearance. He finished top- 10 in five consecutive tournaments including a runner-up at the Kansai Open, to finish 11th in the season rankings.

In 2025, Sugiura was runner-up at the Fujisankei Classic and the International Series Japan, behind Lucas Herbert. He qualified for his first major, the 2025 U.S. Open, in the qualifier at Tarao Country Club, alongside Jinichiro Kozuma and Scott Vincent. He won the ACN Championship and was named Japan Golf Tour Rookie of the Year.

Sugiura joined the 2026 Korn Ferry Tour, where he won the AdventHealth Championship in Kansas City, Missouri.

== Amateur wins ==
- 2018 Ryo Ishikawa Cup Junior Championship, Japan Junior Championship
- 2019 JHGA Spring Championship 15-17
- 2022 Nomura Cup (Individual)
- 2023 Pacific Rim Collegiate Golf Super League Tournament

== Professional wins (5) ==
=== Japan Golf Tour wins (3) ===
Legend
Japan majors (1)
Other Japan Golf Tour (2)

No.	Date	Tournament	Winning score	Margin of victory	Runners-up
1	19 Nov 2023	Dunlop Phoenix Tournament (as an amateur)	−12 (64-68-69-71=272)	3 strokes	(Japan) Keita Nakajima, (Japan) Taiga Semikawa
2	7 Jul 2024	Japan PGA Championship	−18 (65-66-65-72=268)	1 stroke	(Japan) Yuki Inamori, (Japan) Taiga Semikawa
3	9 Nov 2025	ACN Championship	−13 (67-65-68=200) (Note: Shortened to 54 holes due to weather.)	3 strokes	(Japan) Shu Fukuzumi, (Japan) Shugo Imahira, (Japan) Naoyuki Kataoka, (Japan) Takashi Ogiso, (Japan) Tatsunori Shogenji

=== Korn Ferry Tour wins (1) ===
No.	Date	Tournament	Winning score	Margin of victory	Runner-up
1	23 Aug 2026	AdventHealth Championship	−19 (62-68-64-65=259)	1 stroke	(United States) Austin Hitt

=== Japan Challenge Tour wins (1) ===
No.	Date	Tournament	Winning score	Margin of victory	Runner-up
1	2 Sep 2023	Dunlop Phoenix Tournament Challenge (as an amateur)	−11 (75-66-64=205)	1 stroke	(Japan) Masato Sumiuchi (a)

== Results in major championships ==
Tournament	2025
Masters Tournament	
PGA Championship	
U.S. Open	CUT
The Open Championship	

Did not play

CUT = missed the halfway cut

== Team appearances ==
Amateur

- Spirit International Amateur (representing Japan): 2019
- Nomura Cup (representing Japan): 2022 (winners)
- Asian Games (representing Japan): 2022
- Bonallack Trophy (representing Asia/Pacific): 2023 (winners)
- Eisenhower Trophy (representing Japan): 2023
