= 2023 Japan Golf Tour =

Golf tour season

2023 Japan Golf Tour season
- Duration: 30 March 2023 – 3 December 2023
- Number of official events: 26
- Most wins: (Japan) Keita Nakajima (3)
- Money list: (Japan) Keita Nakajima
- Most Valuable Player: (Japan) Keita Nakajima
- Rookie of the Year: (Japan) Keita Nakajima

The 2023 Japan Golf Tour was the 50th season of the Japan Golf Tour (formerly the PGA of Japan Tour), the main professional golf tour in Japan since it was formed in 1973.

== Schedule ==
The following table lists official events during the 2023 season.

Date	Tournament	Location	Purse (¥)	Winner (Note: The number in brackets after each winner's name is the number of Japan Golf Tour events they had won up to and including that tournament. This information is only shown for Japan Golf Tour members.)	OWGR points	Other tours (Note: ASA − Asian Tour; EUR − European Tour; KOR − Korean Tour; PGAT − PGA Tour.)	Notes
2 Apr	Token Homemate Cup	Mie	130,000,000	(Japan) Shugo Imahira (8)	6.93		
16 Apr	Kansai Open Golf Championship	Osaka	80,000,000	(Japan) Taiga Semikawa (3)	5.43		
23 Apr	ISPS Handa Championship in Japan	Ibaraki	US$2,000,000	(Australia) Lucas Herbert (n/a)	19.22	EUR	
30 Apr	The Crowns	Aichi	110,000,000	(Japan) Hiroshi Iwata (5)	6.30		
21 May	Golf Partner Pro-Am Tournament	Ibaraki	60,000,000	(Philippines) Juvic Pagunsan (2)	5.09		Pro-Am
28 May	Gateway to The Open Mizuno Open	Okayama	80,000,000	(Japan) Kensei Hirata (1)	6.39		
4 Jun	BMW Japan Golf Tour Championship Mori Building Cup	Ibaraki	150,000,000	(Japan) Takumi Kanaya (4)	6.64		Japan major
11 Jun	ASO Iizuka Challenged Golf Tournament	Fukuoka	100,000,000	(Japan) Keita Nakajima (2)	5.67		
18 Jun	Hana Bank Invitational	Chiba	100,000,000	(South Korea) Yang Ji-ho (1)	7.33	KOR	New to Japan Golf Tour
25 Jun	Japan Players Championship	Tochigi	50,000,000	(Japan) Hideto Tanihara (18)	5.63		
2 Jul	Shigeo Nagashima Invitational Sega Sammy Cup	Hokkaidō	150,000,000	(South Africa) Jbe' Kruger (2)	6.52		
30 Jul	Japan PGA Championship	Hokkaidō	150,000,000	(Japan) Kensei Hirata (2)	5.89		Japan major
6 Aug	Yokohama Minato Championship	Kanagawa	100,000,000	(Japan) Keita Nakajima (3)	6.09		New tournament
27 Aug	Sansan KBC Augusta	Fukuoka	100,000,000	(South Korea) Song Young-han (2)	6.07		
3 Sep	Fujisankei Classic	Yamanashi	110,000,000	(Japan) Takumi Kanaya (5)	6.07		
10 Sep	Shinhan Donghae Open	South Korea	₩1,400,000,000	(South Korea) Koh Gun-taek (1)	8.52	ASA, KOR	
17 Sep	ANA Open	Hokkaidō	100,000,000	(Japan) Hideto Tanihara (19)	5.36		
24 Sep	Panasonic Open Golf Championship	Hyōgo	100,000,000	(Japan) Tomoharu Otsuki (3)	5.56		
1 Oct	Vantelin Tokai Classic	Aichi	110,000,000	(Japan) Yuta Kinoshita (2)	5.88		
8 Oct	ACN Championship	Hyōgo	100,000,000	(Japan) Yuki Inamori (5)	4.40		
15 Oct	Japan Open Golf Championship	Osaka	210,000,000	(Japan) Aguri Iwasaki (1)	6.64		Japan major
5 Nov	Mynavi ABC Championship	Hyōgo	120,000,000	(Japan) Keita Nakajima (4)	5.58		
12 Nov	Mitsui Sumitomo Visa Taiheiyo Masters	Shizuoka	200,000,000	(Japan) Shugo Imahira (9)	5.48		
19 Nov	Dunlop Phoenix Tournament	Miyazaki	200,000,000	(Japan) Yuta Sugiura (a) (1)	9.97		
26 Nov	Casio World Open	Kōchi	200,000,000	(Japan) Taichi Nabetani (1)	6.57		
3 Dec	Golf Nippon Series JT Cup	Tokyo	130,000,000	(Japan) Taiga Semikawa (4)	4.11		Japan major

=== Unofficial events ===
The following events were sanctioned by the Japan Golf Tour, but did not carry official money, nor were wins official.

Date	Tournament	Location	Purse (¥)	Winner(s)	OWGR points	Other tours	Notes
9 Apr	Masters Tournament	United States	US$18,000,000	(Spain) Jon Rahm	100		Major championship
21 May	PGA Championship	United States	US$17,500,000	(United States) Brooks Koepka	100		Major championship
18 Jun	U.S. Open	United States	US$20,000,000	(United States) Wyndham Clark	100		Major championship
23 Jul	The Open Championship	England	US$16,500,000	(United States) Brian Harman	100		Major championship
22 Oct	Zozo Championship	Chiba	US$8,500,000	(United States) Collin Morikawa	30.19	PGAT	
10 Dec	Hitachi 3Tours Championship	Chiba	57,000,000	LPGA of Japan Tour	n/a		Team event

== Money list ==
The money list was based on prize money won during the season, calculated in Japanese yen. The top three players on the money list earned status to play on the 2024 European Tour (DP World Tour).

Position	Player	Prize money (¥)	Status earned
1	(Japan) Keita Nakajima	184,986,179	Promoted to European Tour
2	(Japan) Taiga Semikawa	155,819,749	Promoted to European Tour
3	(Japan) Takumi Kanaya	141,162,332	Promoted to European Tour
4	(South Korea) Song Young-han	110,545,499	
5	(Japan) Shugo Imahira	102,043,499	

== Awards ==
Award	Winner	Ref.
Most Valuable Player	(Japan) Keita Nakajima	
Rookie of the Year (Shimada Trophy)	(Japan) Keita Nakajima	

== Japan Challenge Tour ==
2023 Japan Challenge Tour season
- Duration: 5 April 2023 – 20 October 2023
- Number of official events: 12
- Most wins: (Japan) Tatsunori Shogenji (2) (Japan) Kosuke Suzuki (2)
- Money list: (Japan) Tatsunori Shogenji

The 2023 Japan Challenge Tour, titled as the 2023 Abema Tour for sponsorship reasons, was the 38th season of the Japan Challenge Tour, the official development tour to the Japan Golf Tour.

=== Schedule ===
The following table lists official events during the 2023 season.

Date	Tournament	Location	Purse (¥)	Winner (Note: The number in brackets after each winner's name is the number of Japan Challenge Tour events they had won up to and including that tournament. It is rare for someone to accumulate many wins on the Japan Challenge Tour as success at this level usually leads to promotion to the Japan Golf Tour.)	OWGR points
7 Apr	Novil Cup	Tokushima	15,000,000	(Japan) Taiga Sugihara (2)	2.75
21 Apr	i Golf Shaper Challenge	Fukuoka	15,000,000	(Japan) Kosuke Suzuki (1)	2.51
12 May	Japan Players Championship Challenge	Fukui	15,000,000	(Japan) Kosuke Suzuki (2)	2.51
26 May	Taiheiyo Club Challenge Tournament	Saitama	15,000,000	(Japan) Shinji Tomimura (2)	1.49
9 Jun	Landic Challenge 10	Fukuoka	15,000,000	(Japan) Sho Nagasawa (1)	1.68
16 Jun	Japan Create Challenge	Fukuoka	15,000,000	(Japan) Tatsunori Shogenji (1)	2.06
14 Jul	Minami Akita CC Michinoku Challenge	Akita	15,000,000	(Japan) Tatsunori Shogenji (2)	2.09
2 Sep	Dunlop Phoenix Tournament Challenge	Fukushima	15,000,000	(Japan) Yuta Sugiura (a) (1)	1.53
8 Sep	PGM Challenge	Hyōgo	15,000,000	(Japan) Daiki Imano (1)	1.75
29 Sep	Elite Grips Challenge	Hyōgo	15,000,000	(Japan) Taichi Kimura (1)	1.33
6 Oct	Ryo Ishikawa Everyone Project Challenge	Tochigi	15,000,000	(Japan) Kuranosuke Shimizu (a) (1)	1.15
20 Oct	Delight Works JGTO Final	Ibaraki	20,000,000	(Japan) Yushi Ito (1)	1.82

=== Money list ===
The money list was based on prize money won during the season, calculated in Japanese yen. The top 20 players on the money list earned status to play on the 2024 Japan Golf Tour.

Position	Player	Prize money (¥)
1	(Japan) Tatsunori Shogenji	11,253,106
2	(Japan) Kosuke Suzuki	5,604,835
3	(Japan) Sejung Hiramoto	4,484,230
4	(Japan) Shinji Tomimura	4,470,755
5	(Japan) Masamichi Ito	4,250,833
