= Taiga Semikawa =

Japanese professional golfer (born 2001)

Personal information
- Nationality: Japan
- Born: 11 January 2001 (age 25) Katō, Hyōgo, Japan
- Height: 175 cm (5 ft 9 in)
- Weight: 77 kg (170 lb)

Career
- Sport: Golf
- College: Tohoku Fukushi University
- Turned professional: 2022
- Current tour: Japan Golf Tour
- Professional wins: 6

Number of wins by tour
- Japan Golf Tour: 5
- Other: 1

Best results in major championships
- Masters Tournament: DNP
- PGA Championship: DNP
- U.S. Open: DNP
- The Open Championship: CUT: 2023

Taiga Semikawa (Japanese: 蟬川 泰果, born 11 January 2001) is a Japanese professional golfer. He had a very successful amateur career where he won twice on the Japan Golf Tour and became number one in the World Amateur Golf Ranking.

== Early life and amateur career ==
Semikawa was born in Hyōgo, Kansai region. He is named after Tiger Woods and started to play golf with plastic clubs at the age of age one. He was educated at Tohoku Fukushi University in Sendai, same school as Hideki Matsuyama.

In 2021, he won both the Kansai Amateur Championship and Kanto Collegiate Championship, and was runner-up at the Japan Collegiate Championship. In 2022, he again won the Kanto Collegiate Championship, and was 3rd at the Japan Amateur Championship.

He came to national attention at the Kansai Open in April 2022, which he led after rounds of 64 and 67, but collapsed in the final round with a 77. In June, he won the Japan Challenge Tour's Japan Create Challenge in Fukuoka by two strokes with a score of 63 on the final day.

Semikawa represented Japan at the 2022 Eisenhower Trophy at Le Golf National in France where he had the second lowest individual score, a stroke behind Tobias Jonsson of Sweden.

In September 2022 he won the Panasonic Open on the Japan Golf Tour, setting a new amateur record of 61 in round three. Afterwards he ascended to number one in the World Amateur Golf Ranking, becoming the fourth Japanese to rise to the number one position following Hideki Matsuyama, Takumi Kanaya and Keita Nakajima. In October he won the Japan Open, the first amateur to win since the tournament's inception in 1927, marking his third victory in his last three starts in professional tournaments.

== Professional career ==
Semikawa turned professional after he won the Japan Open in October 2022, and made his professional debut at the Mynavi ABC Championship in his home prefecture of Hyōgo. In December, he represented the winning side in the Hitachi 3Tours Championship.

In 2023, he won the Kansai Open at Izumigaoka Country Club in Osaka, taking revenge for his final round collapse as an amateur the previous year. He made his major debut at the 2023 Open Championship, having earned a start through his Japan Open win.

== Amateur wins ==
- 2021 Kansai Amateur Championship, Kanto Collegiate Championship
- 2022 Kanto Collegiate Championship

== Professional wins (6) ==
=== Japan Golf Tour wins (5) ===
Legend
Japan majors (3)
Other Japan Golf Tour (2)

No.	Date	Tournament	Winning score	Margin of victory	Runner(s)-up
1	25 Sep 2022	Panasonic Open Golf Championship (as an amateur)	−22 (71-68-61-66=266)	1 stroke	(Japan) Aguri Iwasaki
2	23 Oct 2022	Japan Open Golf Championship (as an amateur)	−10 (64-70-63-73=270)	2 strokes	(Japan) Kazuki Higa
3	16 Apr 2023	Kansai Open Golf Championship	−17 (69-67-64-67=267)	4 strokes	(Japan) Takahiro Hataji
4	3 Dec 2023	Golf Nippon Series JT Cup	−15 (67-64-66-68=265)	1 stroke	(Japan) Takumi Kanaya, (Japan) Keita Nakajima
5	8 Jun 2025	BMW Japan Golf Tour Championship Mori Building Cup	−10 (68-69-69-66=272)	Playoff	(Japan) Mikumu Horikawa

Japan Golf Tour playoff record (1–0)

No.	Year	Tournament	Opponent	Result
1	2025	BMW Japan Golf Tour Championship Mori Building Cup	(Japan) Mikumu Horikawa	Won with birdie on first extra hole

=== Japan Challenge Tour wins (1) ===
No.	Date	Tournament	Winning score	Margin of victory	Runner-up
1	19 Jun 2022	Japan Create Challenge (as an amateur)	−20 (67-66-63=196)	2 strokes	(Japan) Tomofumi Ouchi

== Results in major championships ==
Tournament	2023
Masters Tournament	
PGA Championship	
U.S. Open	
The Open Championship	CUT

Did not play

CUT = missed the halfway cut

== Team appearances ==
Amateur

- Eisenhower Trophy (representing Japan): 2022

Professional

- Hitachi 3Tours Championship (representing JGTO): 2022 (winners)
