= Asia-Pacific Amateur Championship =

Tournament information
- Location: Rotates through Asia-Pacific
- Established: 2009
- Organized by: Asia-Pacific Golf Confederation
- Format: Stroke play
- Month played: October

Tournament record score
- Aggregate: 267 Takumi Kanaya (2018)
- To par: −18 Hideki Matsuyama (2011)

Current champion
- (Thailand) Fifa Laopakdee

The Asia-Pacific Amateur Championship is an annual amateur golf tournament. It is played at various locations throughout Asia-Pacific. It is organized by the Asia-Pacific Golf Confederation (APGC) and was first played in 2009. It was organized in conjunction with the Masters Tournament and The R&A, organizers of The Open Championship. The winner receives an invitation to the Masters and The Open Championship provided he maintain his amateur status prior to each event (beginning in 2018). The winner and runner-up had previously gained entry to International Final Qualifying for the Open from 2009 to 2017. In 2011, the winner also receives an invitation to the Asian Tour's season ending Thailand Golf Championship. It is also considered an "elite" event by the World Amateur Golf Ranking in that any player that makes the cut is eligible to be ranked. Only the U.S. Amateur, British Amateur, and European Amateur have this distinction.

The winner in 2012, Guan Tianlang went on to play in the 2013 Masters Tournament and so became the youngest player in Masters history at 14.

== Winners ==
Year	Player	Score	Margin of victory	Runner(s)-up	Venue
Asia-Pacific Amateur
2026	(Thailand) Fifa Laopakdee (2)	278 (−16)	3 strokes	(New Zealand) Zack Swanwick	Te Arai Links (South course), New Zealand
2025	(Thailand) Fifa Laopakdee	273 (−15)	Playoff	(Japan) Taisei Nagasaki	Emirates Golf Club (Majlis course), Dubai, UAE
2024	(China) Ding Wenyi	268 (−12)	1 stroke	(China) Zhou Ziqin	Taiheiyo Club Gotemba, Japan
2023	(Australia) Jasper Stubbs	285 (+1)	Playoff	(China) Ding Wenyi (China) Sampson Zheng	Royal Melbourne Golf Club, Australia
2022	(Australia) Harrison Crowe	275 (−13)	1 stroke	(China) Jin Bo	Amata Spring Country Club, Thailand
2021	(Japan) Keita Nakajima	270 (−14)	Playoff	(Hong Kong) Kho Taichi	Dubai Creek Golf & Yacht Club, Dubai, UAE
2020	Cancelled				
2019	(China) Lin Yuxin (2)	278 (−10)	Playoff	(Japan) Takumi Kanaya	Sheshan Golf Club, China
2018	(Japan) Takumi Kanaya	267 (−13)	2 strokes	(Japan) Keita Nakajima (India) Rayhan Thomas	Sentosa Golf Club, Singapore
2017	(China) Lin Yuxin	270 (−14)	3 strokes	(China) Andy Zhang	Royal Wellington Golf Club, New Zealand
2016	(Australia) Curtis Luck	276 (−12)	1 stroke	(Australia) Brett Coletta	Jack Nicklaus Golf Club Korea, South Korea
2015	(China) Jin Cheng	199 (−11)*	1 stroke	(Australia) Cameron Davis (Australia) Ryan Ruffels	Clearwater Bay Golf & Country Club, Hong Kong
2014	(Australia) Antonio Murdaca	275 (−13)	7 strokes	(Japan) Mikumu Horikawa	Royal Melbourne Golf Club, Australia
2013	(South Korea) Lee Chang-woo	281 (−3)	3 strokes	(Japan) Shohei Hasegawa	Nanshan International Golf Club, China
2012	(China) Guan Tianlang	273 (−15)	1 stroke	(Chinese Taipei) Pan Cheng-tsung	Amata Spring Country Club, Thailand
Asian Amateur
2011	(Japan) Hideki Matsuyama (2)	270 (−18)	1 stroke	(South Korea) Lee Soo-min	Singapore Island Country Club, Singapore
2010	(Japan) Hideki Matsuyama	269 (−15)	5 strokes	(Australia) Tarquin MacManus	Kasumigaseki Country Club, Japan
2009	(South Korea) Han Chang-won	276 (−12)	5 strokes	(South Korea) Eric Chun	Mission Hills Golf Club (World Cup course), China

* Shortened to 54 holes due to poor weather conditions.
