= Atomu Shigenaga =

Japanese golfer

Personal information
- Nationality: Japan
- Born: 14 September 1988 (age 38) Kumamoto Prefecture, Japan
- Height: 1.72 m (5 ft 8 in)
- Weight: 60 kg (132 lb)

Career
- Sport: Golf
- Turned professional: 2008
- Current tour: Japan Golf Tour
- Professional wins: 1

Number of wins by tour
- Japan Golf Tour: 1

Atomu Shigenaga (重永 亜斗夢, Shigenaga Atomu; born 14 September 1988) is a Japanese professional golfer who plays on the Japan Golf Tour.

Shigenaga has played on the Japan Golf Tour since 2013. He won his first tournament at the 2018 Token Homemate Cup.

== Professional wins (1) ==
=== Japan Golf Tour wins (1) ===
No.	Date	Tournament	Winning score	Margin of victory	Runner-up
1	15 Apr 2018	Token Homemate Cup	−12 (64-72-63-73=272)	1 stroke	(Japan) Ryo Ishikawa
