= Hayden Buckley (golfer) =

American professional golfer (born 1996)

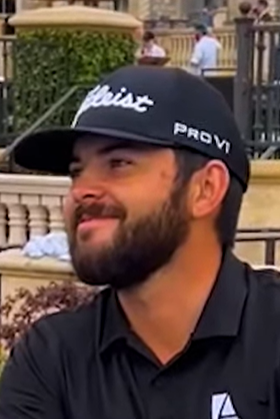

Personal information
- Full name: Charles Hayden Buckley
- Nationality: United States
- Born: March 1, 1996 (age 30) Chattanooga, Tennessee, U.S.
- Height: 5 ft 11 in (1.80 m)
- Weight: 180 lb (82 kg; 13 st)

Career
- Sport: Golf
- College: University of Missouri
- Turned professional: 2018
- Current tour: PGA Tour
- Former tours: Korn Ferry Tour; PGA Tour Canada
- Professional wins: 2
- Highest ranking: 71 (May 21, 2023) (as of October 25, 2026)

Number of wins by tour
- Korn Ferry Tour: 1
- Other: 1

Best results in major championships
- Masters Tournament: DNP
- PGA Championship: T26: 2023
- U.S. Open: T14: 2022
- The Open Championship: DNP

Charles Hayden Buckley (born March 1, 1996) is an American professional golfer on the PGA Tour. He won the 2019 ATB Financial Classic on the PGA Tour Canada and the 2021 LECOM Suncoast Classic on the Korn Ferry Tour.

== College career ==
Buckley went to high school in Tupelo, Mississippi. Despite not being heavily recruited in high school, Buckley signed with the University of Missouri where he enjoyed four college wins. By his senior year, he was a first-team All-Southeastern Conference selection, a third-team All-American, and named the Missouri Male Athlete of the Year for the 2017–18 season.

== Professional career ==
Buckley turned professional in 2018. In the 2019 season, he played in all 12 PGA Tour Canada events, making 11 cuts and registering six top-10 finishes. Buckley claimed his first career Mackenzie Tour victory at the ATB Financial Classic and a sixth-place finish on the Order of Merit to earn Korn Ferry Tour membership.

In February 2021, Buckley earned his first Korn Ferry Tour title in his 17th career start with a birdie on the first playoff hole at the LECOM Suncoast Classic.

In January 2023, he finished runner-up at the Sony Open in Hawaii, one shot behind Kim Si-woo.

== Professional wins (2) ==
=== Korn Ferry Tour wins (1) ===
No.	Date	Tournament	Winning score	Margin of victory	Runners-up
1	Feb 21, 2021	LECOM Suncoast Classic	−13 (68-65-68-70=271)	Playoff	(United States) Dawson Armstrong, (United States) Taylor Montgomery

Korn Ferry Tour playoff record (1–0)

No.	Year	Tournament	Opponents	Result
1	2021	LECOM Suncoast Classic	(United States) Dawson Armstrong, (United States) Taylor Montgomery	Won with birdie on first extra hole

=== PGA Tour Canada wins (1) ===
No.	Date	Tournament	Winning score	Margin of victory	Runner-up
1	Aug 11, 2019	ATB Financial Classic	−18 (66-66-64-70=266)	Playoff	(United States) Sam Fidone

== Results in major championships ==
Tournament	2021	2022	2023
Masters Tournament			
PGA Championship			T26
U.S. Open	CUT	T14	CUT
The Open Championship			

Did not play

CUT = missed the half-way cut
"T" = tied

== Results in The Players Championship ==
Tournament	2022	2023	2024
The Players Championship	T66	CUT	CUT

CUT = missed the halfway cut
"T" indicates a tie for a place

== See also ==
- 2021 Korn Ferry Tour Finals graduates
- 2024 PGA Tour Qualifying School graduates
