= World City Championship =

Golf tournament

Coordinates: 22.492°N 114.115°E

Tournament information
- Location: New Territories, Hong Kong
- Established: 2023
- Course: Hong Kong Golf Club
- Par: 70
- Length: 6,710 yards (6,140 m)
- Tour: Asian Tour
- Format: Stroke play
- Prize fund: US$1,000,000
- Month played: March
- Final year: 2023

Tournament record score
- Aggregate: 198 Kho Taichi (2023)
- To par: −12 as above

Final champion
- (Hong Kong) Kho Taichi

Location map
- Location in China Location in Hong Kong

The World City Championship was a golf tournament on the Asian Tour held at the Hong Kong Golf Club in Hong Kong.

The inaugural tournament served as one of 11 events around the world in the Open Qualifying Series (OQS) for the 2023 Open Championship. Kho Taichi, Kim Bi-o and Travis Smyth qualified, after Michael Hendry withdrew for medical reasons.

== Winners ==
Year	Winner	Score	To par	Margin of victory	Runner-up
2023	(Hong Kong) Kho Taichi	198 (Note: Shortened to 54 holes due to weather.)	−12	2 strokes	(New Zealand) Michael Hendry

== See also ==
- Hong Kong Open
