= Token Homemate Cup =

Tournament information
- Location: Kuwana, Mie, Japan
- Established: 1993
- Course: Token Tado Country Club Nagoya
- Par: 71
- Length: 7,062 yards (6,457 m)
- Tour: Japan Golf Tour
- Format: Stroke play
- Prize fund: ¥130,000,000
- Month played: March

Tournament record score
- Aggregate: 261 Takumi Kanaya (2024)
- To par: −23 as above

Current champion
- (Japan) Tomohiro Ishizaka

Final champion
- Location in Japan Location in the Mie Prefecture

The Token Homemate Cup (東建ホームメイトカップ, Tōken hōmumeito kappu) is a professional golf tournament on the Japan Golf Tour. It has been played annually since 1993. It is usually the first event played on the Japan Golf Tour season. The tournament record is 267 (−21). It was set by Wayne Perske in 2006. The course measures 7,081 yards and the par is 71. Since 2009, the purse has been ¥130,000,000 with ¥26,000,000 going to the winner. Prize money was ¥90,000,000 from 1993 to 1997, ¥110,000,000 in 1998, ¥100,000,000 from 1999 to 2005 and ¥110,000,000 from 2006 to 2008.

== Tournament hosts ==
Years	Venue	Location
2001, 2003–2005, 2007–present	Token Tado Country Club Nagoya	Kuwana, Mie
2006	Token Shuga Country Club	Kani, Gifu
1993–2000, 2002	Kedōin Golf Club	Kedōin, Kagoshima (now Satsumasendai)

== Winners ==
Year	Winner	Score	To par	Margin of victory	Runner(s)-up	Ref.
Token Homemate Cup
2026	(Japan) Tomohiro Ishizaka	204 (Note: Shortened to 54 holes due to weather.)	−9	Playoff	(Japan) Yuki Inamori	
2025	(Japan) Tatsunori Shogenji	196	−17	3 strokes	(Japan) Ren Yonezawa	
2024	(Japan) Takumi Kanaya (2)	261	−23	2 strokes	(Japan) Tatsunori Shogenji	
2023	(Japan) Shugo Imahira	264	−20	2 strokes	(Japan) Rikuya Hoshino	
2022	(Japan) Jinichiro Kozuma	270	−14	Playoff	(Japan) Yuto Katsuragawa	
2021	(Japan) Takumi Kanaya	202 (Note: Shortened to 54 holes due to a positive COVID-19 test in the field.)	−11	1 stroke	(Japan) Keita Nakajima (a)	
2020	Cancelled due to the COVID-19 pandemic					
2019	(Australia) Brendan Jones (2)	269	−15	1 stroke	(Australia) Matthew Griffin	
2018	(Japan) Atomu Shigenaga	272	−12	1 stroke	(Japan) Ryo Ishikawa	
2017	(China) Liang Wenchong	268	−16	2 strokes	(Japan) Yoshinori Fujimoto	
2016	(South Korea) Kim Kyung-tae	271	−13	Playoff	(Japan) Tomohiro Kondo	
2015	(New Zealand) Michael Hendry	269	−15	1 stroke	(Japan) Kazuhiro Yamashita	
2014	(Japan) Yūsaku Miyazato	270	−14	2 strokes	(Japan) Hiroshi Iwata	
2013	(Japan) Yoshinobu Tsukada	275	−9	4 strokes	(Japan) Kunihiro Kamii (Japan) Koumei Oda	
2012	(Australia) Brendan Jones	269	−15	2 strokes	(Japan) Ryuichi Oda	
2011	(Japan) Tadahiro Takayama (2)	276	−8	2 strokes	(Japan) Shingo Katayama	
2010	(Japan) Koumei Oda (2)	283	−1	Playoff	(Japan) Satoru Hirota (Japan) Daisuke Maruyama	
2009	(Japan) Koumei Oda	275	−10	Playoff	(South Korea) Kim Jong-duck	
2008	(Japan) Katsumasa Miyamoto	276	−8	1 stroke	(Japan) Taichi Teshima	
2007	(Japan) Yui Ueda	276	−8	1 stroke	(South Korea) Lee Dong-hwan	
2006	(Australia) Wayne Perske	267	−21	2 strokes	(Australia) Brendan Jones (Japan) Yui Ueda	
2005	(Japan) Tadahiro Takayama	205	−8	Playoff	(Japan) Nozomi Kawahara	
2004	(Japan) Hiroyuki Fujita	281	−3	2 strokes	(Japan) Shingo Katayama (South Korea) Charlie Wi	
2003	(Australia) Andre Stolz	278	−6	1 stroke	(Japan) Nobuhiro Masuda (Japan) Tadahiro Takayama (Japan) Tsuyoshi Yoneyama	
Token Corporation Cup
2002	(Japan) Toru Taniguchi	272	−16	2 strokes	(Japan) Hirofumi Miyase	
2001	(Japan) Shingo Katayama	205 (Note: Shortened to 54 holes due to snow.)	−8	2 strokes	(Japan) Tsuneyuki Nakajima	
2000	(Japan) Nobuo Serizawa	281	−7	1 stroke	(Japan) Satoshi Higashi (Japan) Katsunori Kuwabara	
1999	(Japan) Masashi Ozaki (2)	273	−15	1 stroke	(Japan) Toru Taniguchi	
1998	(Japan) Hajime Meshiai (2)	272	−16	1 stroke	(Japan) Masashi Ozaki	
1997	(Japan) Masashi Ozaki	269	−19	1 stroke	(Paraguay) Carlos Franco	
1996	(Japan) Yoshinori Kaneko	275	−13	1 stroke	(United States) Brandt Jobe	
1995	(United States) Todd Hamilton	281	−7	1 stroke	(Australia) Peter Senior	
Token Cup
1994	(Australia) Craig Warren	208 (Note: Shortened to 54 holes due to rain.)	−8	1 stroke	(Japan) Masashi Ozaki	
1993	(Japan) Hajime Meshiai	276	−12	2 strokes	(United States) Todd Hamilton	
