= Golf at the 2018 Asian Games – Men's team =

Men's team at the 2018 Asian Games
- Venue: Pondok Indah Golf & Country Club
- Date: 23 August 2018 – 26 August 2018
- Competitors: 80 from 20 nations

Medalists
gold medal	Japan (JPN)
silver medal	China (CHN)
bronze medal	South Korea (KOR)

The men's team competition at the 2018 Asian Games in Jakarta, Indonesia was held from 23 August to 26 August at the Pondok Indah Golf & Country Club.

== Schedule ==
All times are Western Indonesia Time (UTC+07:00)

Date	Time	Event
Thursday, 23 August 2018	06:00	Round 1
Friday, 24 August 2018	06:00	Round 2
Saturday, 25 August 2018	06:00	Round 3
Sunday, 26 August 2018	06:00	Round 4

== Results ==
Legend

- DNS — Did not start

Rank	Team	Round				Total	To par
Rank	Team	1	2	3	4	Total	To par
1st place, gold medalist(s)	Japan (JPN)	208	206	212	210	836	−28
	Keita Nakajima	68	68	70	71	277	−11
	Ren Yonezawa	70	~~71~~	~~74~~	71	286	−2
	Daiki Imano	~~73~~	68	69	~~74~~	284	−4
	Takumi Kanaya	70	70	73	68	281	−7
2nd place, silver medalist(s)	China (CHN)	217	217	200	209	843	−21
	Jin Cheng	70	72	67	70	279	−9
	Chen Yilong	75	~~75~~	68	71	289	+1
	Zhang Huachuang	72	73	~~73~~	68	286	−2
	Yuan Yechun	~~76~~	72	65	~~72~~	285	−3
3rd place, bronze medalist(s)	South Korea (KOR)	214	209	208	214	845	−19
	Choi Ho-young	69	68	~~75~~	73	285	−3
	Jang Seung-bo	73	71	72	~~75~~	291	+3
	Kim Dong-min	~~75~~	~~73~~	69	72	289	+1
	Oh Seung-taek	72	70	67	69	278	−10
4	Thailand (THA)	215	209	211	211	846	−18
	Kosuke Hamamoto	72	70	70	71	283	−5
	Witchayanon Chothirunrungrueng	73	~~74~~	71	70	288	E
	Sadom Kaewkanjana	70	70	70	~~72~~	282	−6
	Vanchai Luangnitikul	~~79~~	69	~~75~~	70	293	+5
5	Chinese Taipei (TPE)	220	219	204	213	856	−8
	Kevin Yu	74	70	67	70	281	−7
	Lin Chuan-tai	71	73	70	73	287	−1
	Wang Wei-hsuan	75	~~76~~	~~78~~	70	299	+11
	Hsu Hung-hsuan	~~77~~	76	67	~~77~~	297	+9
6	Indonesia (INA)	217	213	217	213	860	−4
	Jonathan Wijono	~~75~~	69	73	71	288	E
	Kevin Caesario Akbar	75	~~72~~	72	74	293	+5
	Naraajie Emerald Ramadhan Putra	69	72	~~77~~	68	286	−2
	Almay Rayhan Yagutah	73	72	72	~~77~~	294	+6
7	India (IND)	213	207	223	218	861	−3
	Aadil Bedi	69	70	74	73	286	−2
	Hari Mohan Singh	~~77~~	~~73~~	~~77~~	~~82~~	309	+21
	Tayhan John Thomas	71	69	73	73	286	−2
	Kshitij Naveed Kaul	73	68	76	72	289	+1
8	Philippines (PHI)	223	209	215	218	865	+1
	Ruperto Zaragosa III	77	~~73~~	67	69	286	−2
	Lloyd Jefferson Go	74	71	71	69	285	−3
	Gao Weiwei	72	67	77	~~80~~	296	+8
	Luis Miguel Castro	~~78~~	71	~~78~~	80	307	+19
9	Singapore (SGP)	221	218	212	221	872	+8
	Gregory Raymund Foo Yongen	70	71	71	72	284	−4
	Joshua Ho	~~79~~	~~78~~	73	74	304	+16
	Low Wee Jin	75	78	~~76~~	~~77~~	306	+18
	Abdul Hadi	76	69	68	75	288	E
10	Malaysia (MAS)	222	216	217	222	877	+13
	Ervin Chang	69	73	71	~~79~~	292	+4
	Rhaasrikanesh Kanavathi	74	~~82~~	73	75	304	+16
	Muhammad Afif Bin Mohd Fathi	79	68	73	75	295	+7
	Adam Arif Madzri	~~80~~	75	~~74~~	72	301	+13
11	Hong Kong (HKG)	225	218	219	224	884	+22
	Wong Shuai Ming	73	72	72	74	291	+3
	Matthew Cheung	75	~~77~~	~~76~~	76	304	+16
	Ng Shing Fung	~~77~~	73	76	~~77~~	303	+15
	Jonathan Lai	77	73	71	74	295	+7
12	Vietnam (VIE)	232	236	221	229	918	+54
	Truong Chi Quan	71	~~80~~	74	75	300	+12
	Nguyen Phuong Toan	~~83~~	79	71	74	307	+19
	Nguyen Hung Dung	81	79	~~80~~	80	320	+32
	Thai Trung Hieu	80	78	76	~~86~~	320	+32
13	Macau (MAC)	230	232	236	222	920	+56
	Si Ngai	73	76	76	73	298	+10
	Hun Pui In	76	78	80	76	310	+22
	Xiao Jieyu	81	~~81~~	80	~~83~~	325	+37
	Ao Ka Hou	~~83~~	78	~~84~~	73	318	+30
14	Qatar (QAT)	234	234	231	228	927	+63
	Saleh Al-Kaabi	73	78	77	78	306	+18
	Ali Al-Shahrani	76	81	79	75	311	+23
	Jaham Al-Kuwari	~~85~~	75	~~81~~	75	316	+28
	Abdulrahman Al-Shahrani	85	~~82~~	75	~~80~~	322	+34
15	Sri Lanka (SRI)	226	232	239	233	930	+66
	Joseph de Soysa	79	73	76	73	301	+13
	Sachin de Silva	74	82	84	83	323	+35
	Gamladdalage Lalith Kumara Bendaluwe	~~DNS~~					
	Sisira Kumara George Patrick	73	77	79	77	306	+18
16	Bangladesh (BAN)	240	226	234	236	936	+72
	Md Shomrat Sikder	81	78	79	80	318	+30
	Md Shahab Uddin	79	~~82~~	75	75	311	+23
	Md Shafique Bakha	80	74	~~82~~	~~82~~	318	+30
	Mohammad Farhad	~~83~~	74	80	81	318	+30
17	Nepal (NEP)	246	233	237	235	951	+87
	Prithvi Malla	~~88~~	~~80~~	79	77	324	+36
	Sukra Bahadur Rai	81	76	77	81	315	+27
	Tanka Bahadur Karki	82	77	~~81~~	77	317	+29
	Ajit B. K.	83	80	81	~~83~~	327	+39
18	Kazakhstan (KAZ)	242	244	240	235	961	+97
	Daulet Tuleubayev	74	72	75	74	295	+7
	Sherkhan Sugur	~~86~~	~~93~~	~~86~~	85	350	+62
	Adilet Kozhabergen	82	85	83	76	326	+38
	Adil Mukhamejanov	86	87	82	~~97~~	352	+64
19	Uzbekistan (UZB)	251	240	244	234	969	+105
	Kanatbek Kurbanaliev	82	83	82	75	322	+34
	Sergey Chen	~~91~~	~~84~~	~~92~~	~~81~~	348	+60
	Roman Ten	91	77	77	79	324	+36
	Yevgeniy Li	78	80	85	80	323	+35
20	Mongolia (MGL)	279	279	256	265	1079	+215
	Boldbaatar Munkhbaatar	91	88	83	82	344	+56
	Gangaa Mendsaikhan	93	100	86	89	368	+80
	Choijamts Gantumur	95	~~101~~	~~99~~	94	389	+101
	Jambaldorj Margad	~~98~~	91	87	~~98~~	374	+86
