= 2024 PGA Tour Qualifying School graduates =

This is a list of the six players who earned 2025 PGA Tour cards through Q School in 2024.

Place	Player	PGA Tour starts	Cuts made	Notes
1	(United States) Lanto Griffin	148	97	1 PGA Tour win
2	(United States) Hayden Buckley	90	46	1 Korn Ferry Tour win
3	(Japan) Takumi Kanaya	25	7	7 Japan Golf Tour wins
T4	(Argentina) Alejandro Tosti	32	14	1 Korn Ferry Tour win
T4	(United States) Will Chandler	0	0	
T4	(United States) Matthew Riedel	0	0	

PGA Tour rookie in 2025
First-time PGA Tour member in 2025, but ineligible for rookie status due to having played eight or more PGA Tour events as a professional in a previous season

== Runner-up finishes on the PGA Tour in 2025 ==
No.	Date	Player	Tournament	Winner	Winning score	Runner-up score	Payout ($)
1	Apr 13	(Argentina) Alejandro Tosti	Corales Puntacana Championship	(South Africa) Garrick Higgo	−14 (64-68-70-72=274)	−13 (64-68-72-68=275)	243.400

== Results on the PGA Tour in 2025 ==
Player	Starts	Cuts made	Best finish	Earnings ($)	FedEx Cup rank
(United States) Lanto Griffin	29	11	3	1,037,926	125
(United States) Hayden Buckley	24	9	T7	379,692	170
(Japan) Takumi Kanaya	29	13	T3	1,463,762	99
(Argentina) Alejandro Tosti ^	20	8	T2	1,010,144	137
(United States) Will Chandler	29	10	T6	567,658	165
(United States) Matthew Riedel	25	10	T26x2	287,732	181

- Retained his PGA Tour card for 2026: won or finished in the top 100 of the final FedEx Cup points list through the 2025 Fed Ex Cup Fall Season.
- Retained PGA Tour conditional status for 2026: finished between 101 and 150 on the final FedEx Cup list through the 2025 Fed Ex Cup Fall Season.
- Failed to retain his PGA Tour card for 2026: finished lower than 150 on the final FedEx Cup list through the 2025 Fed Ex Cup Fall Season.
- ^ Tosti retained his full PGA TOUR card by finishing in a tie for 2nd at the 2025 PGA TOUR Qualifying School

== See also ==
- 2024 Korn Ferry Tour graduates
- 2024 Race to Dubai dual card winners
