= Kho Taichi =

Hong Kong professional golfer

Personal information
- Nationality: Hong Kong
- Born: 13 November 2000 (age 25) Hong Kong
- Height: 181 cm (5 ft 11 in)

Career
- Sport: Golf
- College: University of Notre Dame
- Turned professional: 2023
- Current tours: Asian Tour; Japan Golf Tour
- Professional wins: 4

Number of wins by tour
- Asian Tour: 2
- Other: 2

Best results in major championships
- Masters Tournament: DNP
- PGA Championship: DNP
- U.S. Open: DNP
- The Open Championship: CUT: 2023

Achievements and awards
- Asian Tour Rookie of the Year: 2023
Medal record
Asian Games
Gold medal – first place	2022 Hangzhou	Men's individual
Bronze medal – third place	2022 Hangzhou	Men's team

Kho Taichi

Chinese name
- Traditional Chinese: 許龍一
- Simplified Chinese: 許龙一
Transcriptions
Standard Mandarin
- Hanyu Pinyin: Xǔ Lóngyī
Yue: Cantonese
- Jyutping: heoi2 lung4 jat1

Japanese name
- Kanji: 許 龍一
- Hiragana: きょ たいち
Transcriptions
- Romanization: Kyo Taichi

Kho Taichi (Chinese: 許龍一; born 13 November 2000) is a Hong Kong professional golfer who plays on the Asian Tour. He claimed his first win as a professional in his fourth professional start at the 2023 World City Championship, also becoming the first player from Hong Kong to win on the Asian Tour.

== Amateur career ==
Kho attended the University of Notre Dame from 2018 to 2022. In November 2021, Kho finished runner-up at the Asia-Pacific Amateur Championship. He was defeated in a playoff by Keita Nakajima.

== Professional career ==
Kho turned professional in February 2023, making his first start as a professional at the Singapore Classic on the European Tour. In March, he won the weather-shortened World City Championship on the Asian Tour. The tournament was played at the Hong Kong Golf Club (Kho's home club). He shot two rounds of 64 and a final-round 70 to win by two shots ahead of Michael Hendry. The win also marked the first victory by a Hong Kong player on the Asian Tour. Additionally, he secured a place in the 2023 Open Championship. Kho was named as the Asian Tour Rookie of the Year for the 2023 season.

In June 2026, Kho birdied the final hole to win the International Series Morocco by one stroke ahead of Bubba Watson.

== Amateur wins ==
- 2016 Hong Kong Junior Open Championship
- 2017 Hong Kong Junior Close Championship, Mission Hills Jack Nicklaus Junior Championship
- 2018 Hong Kong Junior Close Championship, Hong Kong Junior Open Championship
- 2021 Golfweek Hoosier Amateur

== Professional wins (4) ==
=== Asian Tour wins (2) ===
Legend
International Series (1)
Other Asian Tour (1)

No.	Date	Tournament	Winning score	Margin of victory	Runner-up
1	26 Mar 2023	World City Championship	−12 (64-64-70=198) (Note: Shortened to 54 holes due to weather.)	2 strokes	(New Zealand) Michael Hendry
2	14 Jun 2026	International Series Morocco	−19 (68-69-68-68=273)	1 stroke	(United States) Bubba Watson

=== Other wins (2) ===
No.	Date	Tournament	Winning score	Margin of victory	Runner(s)-up
1	1 Oct 2023	Asian Games	−27 (62-60-70-69=261)	1 stroke	(South Korea) Im Sung-jae
2	27 Jun 2024	Memorial Olivier Barras	−10 (71-67-65=203)	5 strokes	(Germany) Sven Cremer, (Switzerland) Filippo Serra (a), (Switzerland) Miles Wennestam (a)

== Playoff record ==
Japan Golf Tour playoff record (0–1)

No.	Year	Tournament	Opponents	Result
1	2026	BMW Japan Golf Tour Championship Mori Building Cup	(Japan) Hiroshi Iwata, (Japan) Naoyuki Kataoka	Iwata won with birdie on first extra hole

== Results in major championships ==
Tournament	2023
Masters Tournament	
PGA Championship	
U.S. Open	
The Open Championship	CUT

Did not play

CUT = missed the half-way cut
