= Jang Yu-bin =

South Korean professional golfer (born 2002)

Personal information
- Nationality: South Korea
- Born: 11 June 2002 (age 24) Gyeonggi Province, South Korea
- Height: 1.83 m (6 ft 0 in)

Career
- Sport: Golf
- College: Korea National Sport University
- Turned professional: 2023
- Current tour: Korean Tour
- Former tour: LIV Golf
- Professional wins: 5

Achievements and awards
- Korean Tour Order of Merit winner: 2024
- Korean Tour Player of the Year: 2024
Medal record
Asian Games
Gold medal – first place	2022 Hangzhou	Men's team

Jang Yu-bin (Korean: 장유빈; born 11 June 2002) is a South Korean professional golfer. He won the Korean Tour Order of Merit in 2024, and was a gold medalist in the team event at the 2022 Asian Games.

== Early life and family ==
Jang was born in Gyeonggi Province, South Korea. He took up golf at an early age, supported by his grandmother, a former tennis player. He went to the Korea National Sport University.

== Amateur career ==
Jang had a successful amateur career, winning several ranking tournaments, including the 2022 World University Golf Championship. He was part of the gold medal winning South Korean team in the 2022 Asian Games (held in 2023), playing alongside Kim Si-woo, Im Sung-jae and Cho Woo-young. Also in 2023, while still an amateur, he won the KPGA Gunsan CC Open on the Korean Tour. He reached a high of 35 in the World Amateur Golf Ranking.

== Professional career ==
Jang turned professional in October 2023 and joined the Korean Tour. In 2024, he successfully defended the KPGA Gunsan CC Open, as well as winning the Baeksang Holdings-Asiad CC Busan Open and had several runner-up finishes, on his way to winning the 2024 Order of Merit and Player of the Year award. In December 2024, he dropped out of the final qualifying stage for the PGA Tour in order to join LIV Golf as a member of the Iron Heads GC alongside Kevin Na.

== Amateur wins ==
- 2020 Bitgoeuljungheung Cup
- 2021 Bitgoeuljungheung Cup
- 2022 KGA President Cup Amateur Championship, World University Golf Championships, Song Am Cup, National Sports Festival

== Professional wins (5) ==
=== Korean Tour wins (5) ===
No.	Date	Tournament	Winning score	Margin of victory	Runner-up
1	27 Aug 2023	KPGA Gunsan CC Open (as an amateur)	−20 (67-68-68-65=268)	Playoff	(South Korea) Jeon Ga-lam
2	14 Jul 2024	KPGA Gunsan CC Open (2)	−16 (66-64-71-71=272)	2 strokes	(South Korea) Jung Han-mil
3	13 Oct 2024	Baeksang Holdings-Asiad CC Busan Open	−9 (65-69-73-68=275)	Playoff	(South Korea) Chang Hee-min
4	14 Jun 2026	KPGA Classic	49 pts (15-12-12-10=49)	4 points	(South Korea) Park Eun-shin
5	21 Jun 2026	Hana Bank Invitational	−10 (69-70-69-66=274)	1 stroke	(South Korea) Kim Min-jun

Korean Tour playoff record (2–2)

No.	Year	Tournament	Opponent(s)	Result
1	2023	KPGA Gunsan CC Open (as an amateur)	(South Korea) Jeon Ga-lam	Won with bogey on first extra hole
2	2024	Bizplay-One The Club Open	(South Korea) Hur In-hoi	Lost to birdie on second extra hole
3	2024	Baeksang Holdings-Asiad CC Busan Open	(South Korea) Chang Hee-min	Won with birdie on first extra hole
4	2026	Lexus Masters	(South Korea) Bae Yong-jun, (South Korea) Jung Jae-hyun	Bae won with birdie on second extra hole

== Team appearances ==
- Bonallack Trophy (representing Asia-Pacific): 2023 (winners)
- Asian Games (representing South Korea): 2023 (winners)
