= 2024 Japan Golf Tour =

Golf tour season

2024 Japan Golf Tour season
- Duration: 28 March 2024 – 1 December 2024
- Number of official events: 24
- Most wins: (Japan) Kensei Hirata (4)
- Money list: (Japan) Takumi Kanaya
- Most Valuable Player: (Japan) Takumi Kanaya
- Rookie of the Year: (Japan) Kensei Hirata

The 2024 Japan Golf Tour was the 51st season of the Japan Golf Tour (formerly the PGA of Japan Tour), the main professional golf tour in Japan since it was formed in 1973.

== Schedule ==
The following table lists official events during the 2024 season.

Date	Tournament	Location	Purse (¥)	Winner (Note: The number in brackets after each winner's name is the number of Japan Golf Tour events they had won up to and including that tournament. This information is only shown for Japan Golf Tour members.)	OWGR points	Other tours (Note: ASA − Asian Tour; EUR − European Tour; KOR − Korean Tour; PGAT − PGA Tour.)	Notes
31 Mar	Token Homemate Cup	Mie	130,000,000	(Japan) Takumi Kanaya (6)	6.95		
28 Apr	ISPS Handa Championship	Shizuoka	US$2,250,000	(Japan) Yuto Katsuragawa (2)	20.72	EUR	
5 May	The Crowns	Aichi	110,000,000	(Japan) Ren Yonezawa (1)	5.92		
12 May	For The Players by The Players	Gunma	50,000,000	(New Zealand) Michael Hendry (2)	5.78		
19 May	Kansai Open Golf Championship	Shiga	80,000,000	(Japan) Takahiro Hataji (1)	6.11		
26 May	Gateway to The Open Mizuno Open	Okayama	100,000,000	(Japan) Ryosuke Kinoshita (3)	7.01		
9 Jun	BMW Japan Golf Tour Championship Mori Building Cup	Ibaraki	150,000,000	(Japan) Hiroshi Iwata (6)	6.67		Japan major
16 Jun	Hana Bank Invitational	South Korea	₩1,300,000,000	(Japan) Takashi Ogiso (1)	8.16	KOR	
23 Jun	Japan Players Championship	Tochigi	50,000,000	(Japan) Ryo Ishikawa (19)	5.19		
7 Jul	Japan PGA Championship	Gifu	150,000,000	(Japan) Yuta Sugiura (2)	5.60		Japan major
14 Jul	Shigeo Nagashima Invitational Sega Sammy Cup	Hokkaidō	100,000,000	(Japan) Kensei Hirata (3)	6.14		
11 Aug	Yokohama Minato Championship	Kanagawa	120,000,000	(Japan) Ren Yonezawa (2)	6.47		
25 Aug	Sansan KBC Augusta	Fukuoka	100,000,000	(Japan) Jinichiro Kozuma (3)	6.68		
1 Sep	Fujisankei Classic	Yamanashi	110,000,000	(Japan) Kensei Hirata (4)	4.49		
8 Sep	Shinhan Donghae Open	South Korea	₩1,400,000,000	(Japan) Kensei Hirata (5)	9.05	ASA, KOR	
15 Sep	ANA Open	Hokkaidō	150,000,000	(Japan) Aguri Iwasaki (2)	6.22		
22 Sep	Panasonic Open Golf Championship	Hyōgo	100,000,000	(Japan) Kensei Hirata (6)	6.16		
29 Sep	Vantelin Tokai Classic	Aichi	110,000,000	(Japan) Takahiro Hataji (2)	6.00		
6 Oct	ACN Championship	Hyōgo	100,000,000	(Japan) Takumi Kanaya (7)	5.84		
13 Oct	Japan Open Golf Championship	Saitama	210,000,000	(Japan) Shugo Imahira (10)	7.25		Japan major
10 Nov	Mitsui Sumitomo Visa Taiheiyo Masters	Shizuoka	200,000,000	(Japan) Ryo Ishikawa (20)	5.88		
17 Nov	Dunlop Phoenix Tournament	Miyazaki	200,000,000	(United States) Max McGreevy (n/a)	8.72		
24 Nov	Casio World Open	Kōchi	200,000,000	(Japan) Hiroshi Iwata (7)	6.41		
1 Dec	Golf Nippon Series JT Cup	Tokyo	130,000,000	(South Africa) Shaun Norris (7)	5.30		Japan major

=== Unofficial events ===
The following events were sanctioned by the Japan Golf Tour, but did not carry official money, nor were wins official.

Date	Tournament	Location	Purse (¥)	Winner(s)	OWGR points	Other tours	Notes
14 Apr	Masters Tournament	United States	US$20,000,000	(United States) Scottie Scheffler	100		Major championship
19 May	PGA Championship	United States	US$18,500,000	(United States) Xander Schauffele	100		Major championship
16 Jun	U.S. Open	United States	US$21,500,000	(United States) Bryson DeChambeau	100		Major championship
21 Jul	The Open Championship	Scotland	US$17,000,000	(United States) Xander Schauffele	100		Major championship
27 Oct	Zozo Championship	Chiba	US$8,500,000	(Colombia) Nico Echavarría	40.43	PGAT	Limited-field event
8 Dec	Hitachi 3Tours Championship	Chiba	57,000,000	LPGA of Japan Tour	n/a		Team event

== Money list ==
The money list was based on prize money won during the season, calculated in Japanese yen. The top three players on the money list earned status to play on the 2025 European Tour (DP World Tour).

Position	Player	Prize money (¥)	Status earned
1	(Japan) Takumi Kanaya	119,551,222	Promoted to European Tour
2	(Japan) Kensei Hirata	114,388,472	Promoted to European Tour
3	(South Africa) Shaun Norris	99,063,677	Forfeited exemption (Note: Norris initially forfeited his exemption, but earned status for the 2025 European Tour season by winning the Alfred Dunhill Championship later in December 2024.)
4	(Japan) Hiroshi Iwata	95,988,495	Promoted to European Tour
5	(Japan) Shugo Imahira	95,044,299	

== Awards ==
Award	Winner	Ref.
Most Valuable Player	(Japan) Takumi Kanaya	
Rookie of the Year (Shimada Trophy)	(Japan) Kensei Hirata	

== Japan Challenge Tour ==
2024 Japan Challenge Tour season
- Duration: 3 April 2024 – 18 October 2024
- Number of official events: 12
- Money list: (Japan) Taisei Yamada

The 2024 Japan Challenge Tour, titled as the 2024 Abema Tour for sponsorship reasons, was the 39th season of the Japan Challenge Tour, the official development tour to the Japan Golf Tour.

=== Schedule ===
The following table lists official events during the 2024 season.

Date	Tournament	Location	Purse (¥)	Winner (Note: The number in brackets after each winner's name is the number of Japan Challenge Tour events they had won up to and including that tournament. It is rare for someone to accumulate many wins on the Japan Challenge Tour as success at this level usually leads to promotion to the Japan Golf Tour.)	OWGR points
5 Apr	Novil Cup	Tokushima	15,000,000	(Japan) Tatsuya Kodai (2)	2.10
26 Apr	i Golf Shaper Challenge	Fukuoka	18,000,000	(Japan) Minato Oshima (1)	2.01
3 May	Japan Players Championship Challenge	Fukui	15,000,000	(Japan) Satoshi Hara (1)	1.76
31 May	Taiheiyo Club Challenge Tournament	Saitama	15,000,000	(Japan) Koichi Kitamura (1)	1.95
7 Jun	Japan Create Challenge	Fukuoka	18,000,000	(Japan) Hirotaro Naito (3)	1.48
14 Jun	Landic Challenge 11	Fukuoka	18,000,000	(Japan) Masashi Hidaka (2)	2.08
26 Jul	Minami Akita CC Michinoku Challenge	Akita	15,000,000	(Japan) Yuki Furukawa (1)	1.90
31 Aug	Dunlop Phoenix Tournament Challenge	Fukushima	15,000,000	(Japan) Itsuki Kurokawa (1)	1.28
6 Sep	PGM Challenge	Fukuoka	15,000,000	(Japan) Suguru Shimoke (1)	1.73
27 Sep	Elite Grips Challenge	Hyōgo	15,000,000	(Japan) Daichi Sakuda (1)	1.38
4 Oct	Ryo Ishikawa Everyone Project Challenge	Tochigi	15,000,000	(Japan) Takara Oshima (1)	1.26
18 Oct	Delight Works JGTO Final	Ibaraki	20,000,000	(Japan) Taisei Yamada (2)	1.76

=== Money list ===
The money list was based on prize money won during the season, calculated in Japanese yen. The top 20 players on the money list earned status to play on the 2025 Japan Golf Tour.

Position	Player	Prize money (¥)
1	(Japan) Taisei Yamada	5,259,789
2	(Japan) Hirotaro Naito	5,232,920
3	(Japan) Takara Oshima	4,671,424
4	(Japan) Minato Oshima	4,525,639
5	(Japan) Koichi Kitamura	4,033,433
