= Jin Cheng =

Chinese professional golfer (born 1998)

Personal information
- Nationality: China
- Born: 6 March 1998 (age 28) Beijing, China
- Height: 1.81 m (5 ft 11 in)
- Weight: 71 kg (157 lb; 11.2 st)

Career
- Sport: Golf
- Turned professional: 2019
- Current tours: Japan Challenge Tour; China Tour
- Former tour: PGA Tour China
- Professional wins: 1

Best results in major championships
- Masters Tournament: CUT: 2016
- PGA Championship: DNP
- U.S. Open: DNP
- The Open Championship: DNP
Medal record
Asian Games
Silver medal – second place	2018 Jakarta–Palembang	Men's team
Bronze medal – third place	2018 Jakarta–Palembang	Individual

Jin Cheng (Chinese: 金诚; pinyin: Jīnchéng, (born 6 March 1998) is a Chinese professional golfer.

== Education ==
Jin studied at St. Gabriel's Secondary School in Singapore.

== Career ==
In September 2014, Jin became the first amateur to lead a PGA Tour China event. In November 2014, he won the Nine Dragons Open on PGA Tour China, becoming the first amateur to win on that tour. He birdied the 17th hole Sunday at Nine Dragons Golf Club while leader, Brazil's Lucas Lee, made three bogeys over his final three holes.

Jin's victory in the 2014 Volvo China Junior Match Play Championship earned him entry into the Volvo China Open, a European Tour event.

Jin has also played, and made cuts on, the OneAsia Tour and the Asian Tour. In December 2015, Jin tied for 11th at the Asian Tour's Thailand Golf Championship for his best career finish outside of China.

In his PGA Tour China career, through the 2015 season, Jin has played 18 events, making the cut 13 times and recording six top-10s, including the victory.

Jin entered the U.S. Junior Amateur in Bluffton, South Carolina as the top-ranked player in the field, but he lost in the first round of match play to Norway's Kristoffer Reitan.

In November 2015, the USC Trojans announced that Jin had signed a national letter of intent to play collegiate golf there, beginning in 2016.

Jin won the rain-shortened 2015 Asia-Pacific Amateur Championship at Hong Kong's Clearwater Bay Golf & Country Club to earn entry into the 2016 Masters Tournament. In this tournament, he shot a course record 62 in the first round.

Cheng turned professional in 2019. He has played on the PGA Tour China, China Tour, and Japan Challenge Tour.

== Amateur wins ==
- 2011 HSBC National Junior Championship Final
- 2012 Jack Nicklaus Junior Championship, China Amateur Futures Tour (Leg 3), Genesis Junior Championship
- 2013 National Team Selection (Leg 3), Ravenwood Junior Championship, NSRCC Junior Open, SGA 5th National Ranking Game
- 2014 Volvo China Junior Match Play
- 2015 Asia-Pacific Amateur Championship
- 2016 Players Amateur
- 2017 National Sports Games of China, Golf

== Professional wins (1) ==
=== PGA Tour China wins (1) ===
No.	Date	Tournament	Winning score	Margin of victory	Runner-up
1	16 Nov 2014	Nine Dragons Open (as an amateur)	−7 (72-68-72-69=281)	1 stroke	(United States) Sam Chien

== Results in major championships ==
Tournament	2016
Masters Tournament	CUT
U.S. Open	
The Open Championship	
PGA Championship	

Did not play

CUT = missed the halfway cut

== Team appearances ==
Amateur

- Bonallack Trophy (representing Asia/Pacific): 2014
