= Yui Ueda =

Japanese professional golfer (1974–2026)

Personal information
- Nationality: Japan
- Born: 9 March 1974 Gifu Prefecture, Japan
- Died: 7 November 2026 (aged 52)
- Height: 1.75 m (5 ft 9 in)
- Weight: 80 kg (180 lb; 13 st)

Career
- Sport: Golf
- College: Senshu University
- Turned professional: 1997
- Former tour: Japan Golf Tour
- Professional wins: 2

Number of wins by tour
- Japan Golf Tour: 1
- Other: 1

Best results in major championships
- Masters Tournament: DNP
- PGA Championship: DNP
- U.S. Open: CUT: 2013
- The Open Championship: DNP

Yui Ueda (上田諭尉, Ueda Yui; 9 March 1974 – 7 November 2026) was a Japanese professional golfer.

== Professional career ==
Ueda played on the Japan Golf Tour, where he won once.

== Death ==
Ueda died on 7 November 2026, at the age of 52.

== Professional wins (2) ==
=== Japan Golf Tour wins (1) ===
No.	Date	Tournament	Winning score	Margin of victory	Runner-up
1	15 Apr 2007	Token Homemate Cup	−8 (66-65-74-71=276)	1 stroke	(South Korea) Lee Dong-hwan

=== Japan Challenge Tour wins (1) ===
No.	Date	Tournament	Winning score	Margin of victory	Runners-up
1	2 Nov 2000	Kourakuen Cup (3rd)	−6 (70-68=138)	4 strokes	(Japan) Isao Goto, (Japan) Go Higaki

== See also ==
- List of male golfers
