= Takumi Kanaya =

Japanese professional golfer (born 1998)

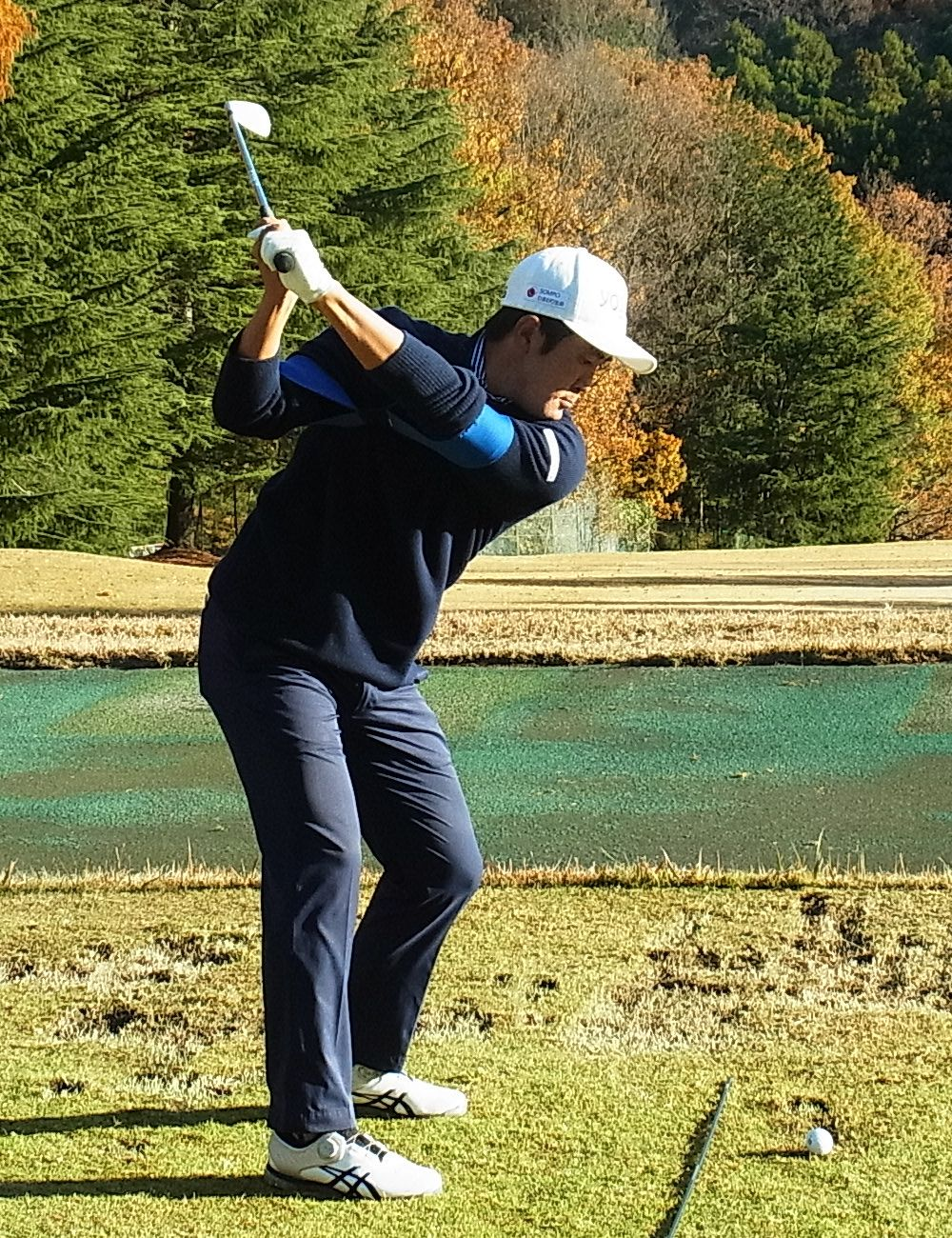

Personal information
- Nationality: Japan
- Born: 23 May 1998 (age 28) Kure, Hiroshima, Japan
- Height: 172 cm (5 ft 8 in)
- Weight: 75 kg (165 lb)

Career
- Sport: Golf
- College: Tohoku Fukushi University
- Turned professional: 2020
- Current tours: PGA Tour; Japan Golf Tour
- Former tour: European Tour
- Professional wins: 9
- Highest ranking: 49 (5 December 2021) (as of 25 October 2026)

Number of wins by tour
- Japan Golf Tour: 8
- Asian Tour: 1

Best results in major championships
- Masters Tournament: T58: 2019
- PGA Championship: CUT: 2021, 2022, 2024, 2025
- U.S. Open: CUT: 2020, 2024, 2025
- The Open Championship: T40: 2025

Achievements and awards
- Mark H. McCormack Medal: 2020
- Japan Golf Tour Rookie of the Year: 2020–21
- Japan Golf Tour money list winner: 2024
- Japan Golf Tour Most Valuable Player: 2024
Medal record
Summer Universiade
Gold medal – first place	2017 Taipei	Men's team
Asian Games
Gold medal – first place	2018 Jakarta–Palembang	Men's team

Takumi Kanaya (Japanese: 金谷拓実, born 23 May 1998) is a Japanese professional golfer. He had an exceptionally successful amateur career and was world ranked number 1 in the World Amateur Golf Ranking for 55 weeks. He also won a professional event on the 2019 Japan Golf Tour while still an amateur.

== Amateur career ==
Kanaya had a successful amateur career, winning the 2015 Japan Amateur Championship and the 2018 Asia-Pacific Amateur Championship. The latter gave him entry to the Masters and the Open Championship in 2019. He played in a number of representative matches, including the 2018 Eisenhower Trophy where he had the second best individual score. Kanaya won team gold medals at the 2017 Summer Universiade and at the 2018 Asian Games. He was world ranked number 1 in the World Amateur Golf Ranking for 55 weeks, winning the Mark H. McCormack Medal for 2020.

While still an amateur, Kanaya played in a number of professional tournaments. He was the runner-up in the 2017 Japan Open Golf Championship, a stroke behind Yuta Ikeda. He won the 2019 Mitsui Sumitomo Visa Taiheiyo Masters on the Japan Golf Tour and finished tied for 3rd place in the 2019 Emirates Australian Open.

== Professional career ==
Kanaya turned professional in October 2020 and made his professional debut at the Japan Open Golf Championship, finishing in 7th place.

In November 2020, Kanaya won the Dunlop Phoenix Tournament. This was his second win in a professional tournament but his first since turning pro. The Dunlop Phoenix is regarded as one of the premier tournaments in Japan. The win moved him to 126th in the Official World Golf Ranking.

In 2024, Kanaya won the Token Homemate Cup and the ACN Championship on the Japan Golf Tour, claiming the season-long money list title, as well as being awarded the Most Valuable Player. After the conclusion of the 2024 Japan Golf Tour season, in December, Kanaya finished third at the PGA Tour Qualifying School, earning a PGA Tour card for 2025.

== Amateur wins ==
- 2015 Japan High School Spring Championship, Japan Amateur Championship
- 2016 JHGA Spring Championship 15 - 17, Chugoku Amateur Championship
- 2018 Chugoku Amateur Championship, Asia-Pacific Amateur Championship

== Professional wins (9) ==
=== Japan Golf Tour wins (8) ===
Legend
Japan majors (1)
Other Japan Golf Tour (7)

No.	Date	Tournament	Winning score	Margin of victory	Runner(s)-up
1	17 Nov 2019	Mitsui Sumitomo Visa Taiheiyo Masters (as an amateur)	−13 (73-66-63-65=267)	1 stroke	(South Africa) Shaun Norris
2	22 Nov 2020	Dunlop Phoenix Tournament	−13 (68-66-68-69=271)	Playoff	(Japan) Toshihiro Ishizaka
3	18 Apr 2021	Token Homemate Cup	−11 (67-65-70=202) (Note: Shortened to 54 holes due to a positive COVID-19 test in the field.)	1 stroke	(Japan) Keita Nakajima (a)
4	4 Jun 2023	BMW Japan Golf Tour Championship Mori Building Cup	−11 (64-71-67-71=273)	2 strokes	(Japan) Yuki Inamori, (Japan) Hiroshi Iwata
5	3 Sep 2023	Fujisankei Classic	−8 (68-68-69-67=272)	4 strokes	(Japan) Naoyuki Kataoka
6	31 Mar 2024	Token Homemate Cup (2)	−23 (67-65-64-65=261)	2 strokes	(Japan) Tatsunori Shogenji
7	6 Oct 2024	ACN Championship	−20 (68-68-65-63=264)	Playoff	(South Korea) Ryu Hyun-woo
8	21 Sep 2025	ANA Open	−17 (68-65-69-69=271)	Playoff	(Japan) Ryo Ishikawa

Japan Golf Tour playoff record (3–1)

No.	Year	Tournament	Opponent	Result
1	2020	Dunlop Phoenix Tournament	(Japan) Toshihiro Ishizaka	Won with birdie on fourth extra hole
2	2023	ASO Iizuka Challenged Golf Tournament	(Japan) Keita Nakajima	Lost to birdie on second extra hole
3	2024	ACN Championship	(South Korea) Ryu Hyun-woo	Won with birdie on first extra hole
4	2025	ANA Open	(Japan) Ryo Ishikawa	Won with par on second extra hole

=== Asian Tour wins (1) ===
Legend
International Series (1)
Other Asian Tour (0)

No.	Date	Tournament	Winning score	Margin of victory	Runners-up
1	12 Feb 2023	International Series Oman	−10 (69-71-67-71=278)	4 strokes	(United States) Berry Henson, (Thailand) Sadom Kaewkanjana

== Results in major championships ==
Results not in chronological order in 2020.

Tournament	2019	2020	2021	2022	2023	2024	2025
Masters Tournament	T58			CUT			
PGA Championship			CUT	CUT		CUT	CUT
U.S. Open		CUT				CUT	CUT
The Open Championship	CUT	NT	CUT	CUT	CUT		T40

Did not play

"T" = tied
CUT = missed the halfway cut
NT = no tournament due to COVID-19 pandemic

== Results in World Golf Championships ==
Tournament	2022
Match Play	R16
Champions	NT^{1}

^{1}Cancelled due to the COVID-19 pandemic

Top 10

QF, R16, R32, R64 = Round in which player lost in match play
NT = No tournament

== Team appearances ==
Amateur

- Nomura Cup (representing Japan): 2015 (winners), 2017
- Bonallack Trophy (representing Asia/Pacific): 2016, 2018 (winners)
- Eisenhower Trophy (representing Japan): 2016, 2018
- Arnold Palmer Cup (representing International team): 2019 (winners)

== See also ==
- 2024 PGA Tour Qualifying School graduates
