= Othman Almulla =

Saudi Arabian golfer

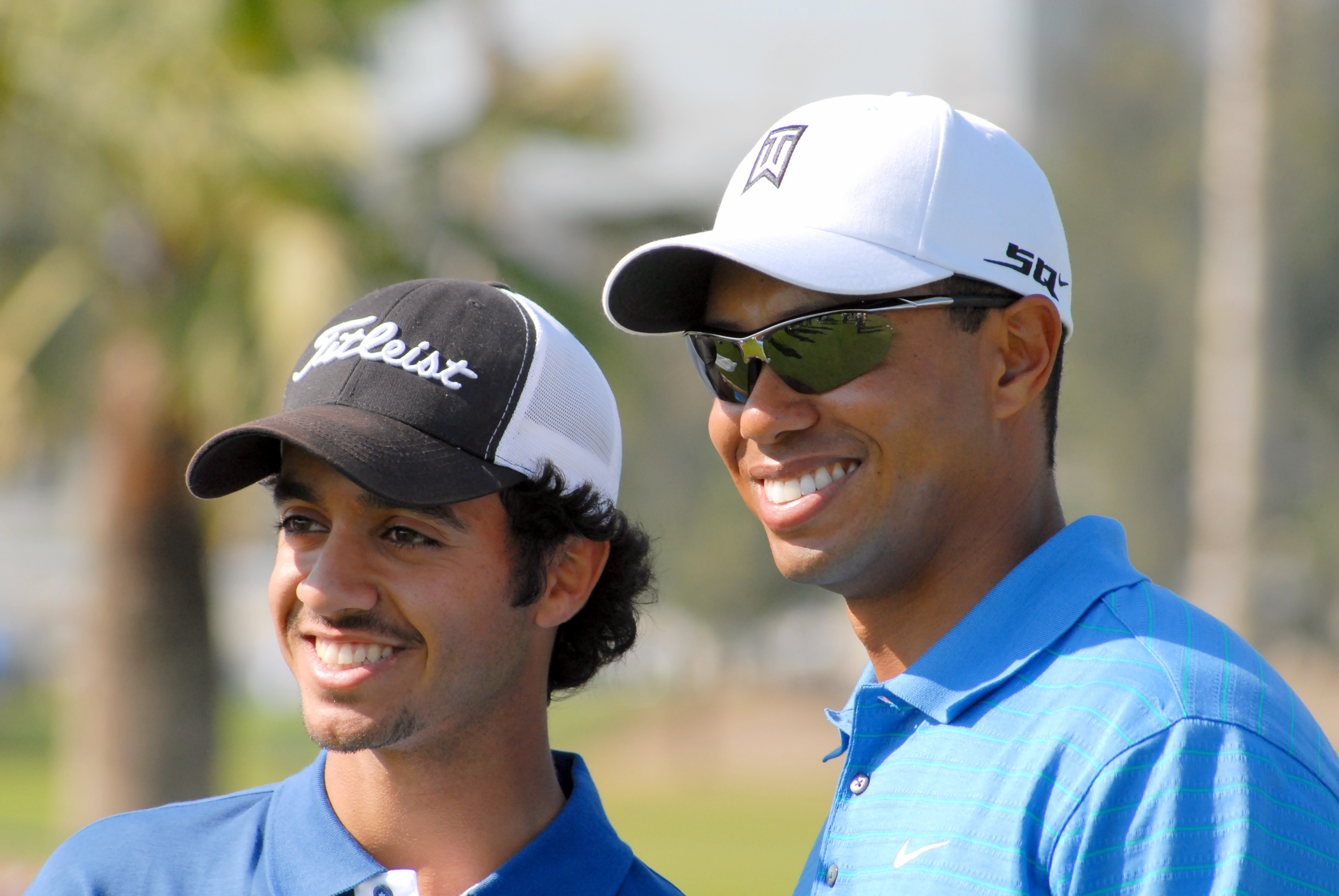
Othman Almulla (L) chats with Tiger Woods (R) at the 2007 Dubai Desert Classic.

Othman Almulla (Arabic: عثمان الملا; born July 9, 1986) is the first Saudi professional golfer, and was the first Saudi Arabian and youngest Arab amateur golfer to qualify and play in the Dubai Desert Classic, a major PGA European Tour event that was held February 1–4, 2007 at the Emirates Golf Club, Dubai, U.A.E.

== Biography ==
After winning the Qatar Open in January 2008, Almulla qualified to play in the European Tour's Commercialbank Qatar Masters January 24–27, 2008 in Doha, Qatar.

Almulla also won the 2008 Saudi Aramco Invitational held at Aramco's Rolling Hills Golf Club in Dhahran, Saudi Arabia on Nov. 7, 2008, becoming the first Saudi national ever to win this tournament long dominated by Bahrainis.

He was also the youngest golfer to win the Pan Arab Amateur Golf Tournament, at age 21.

The child of a Saudi Aramco employee, Almulla was raised inside the Aramco residential camp at Dhahran and learned to play golf at Aramco's Rolling Hills Golf Club.

== Team appearances ==
Amateur

- Eisenhower Trophy (representing Saudi Arabia): 2006, 2008, 2018
