= Keita Nakajima =

Japanese professional golfer (born 2000)

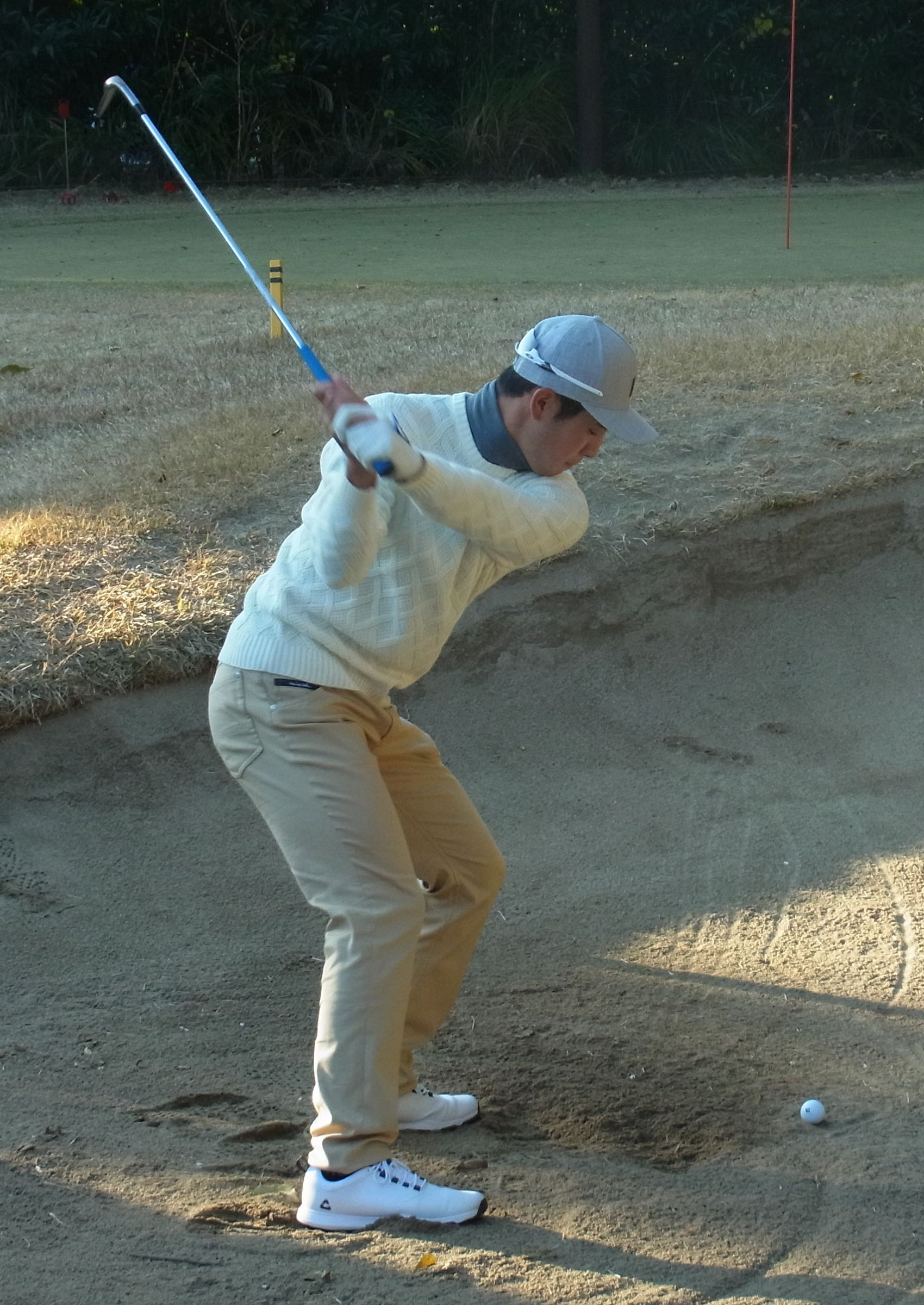
- Nakajima in 2021

Personal information
- Nationality: Japan
- Born: 24 June 2000 (age 26) Saitama, Japan
- Height: 5 ft 10 in (178 cm)
- Weight: 160 lb (73 kg)

Career
- Sport: Golf
- College: Nippon Sport Science University
- Turned professional: 2022
- Current tours: PGA Tour; European Tour
- Former tour: Japan Golf Tour
- Professional wins: 5
- Highest ranking: 75 (14 April 2024) (as of 15 November 2026)

Number of wins by tour
- European Tour: 1
- Japan Golf Tour: 4

Best results in major championships
- Masters Tournament: CUT: 2022
- PGA Championship: CUT: 2024, 2025
- U.S. Open: CUT: 2022
- The Open Championship: CUT: 2022, 2023, 2024, 2026

Achievements and awards
- Mark H. McCormack Medal: 2021, 2022
- Japan Golf Tour money list winner: 2023
- Japan Golf Tour Most Valuable Player: 2023
- Japan Golf Tour Rookie of the Year: 2023
Medal record
Asian Games
Gold medal – first place	2018 Jakarta–Palembang	Men's individual
Gold medal – first place	2018 Jakarta–Palembang	Men's team
Bronze medal – third place	2026 Aichi–Nagoya	Men's team

Keita Nakajima (Japanese: 中島啓太, born 24 June 2000) is a Japanese professional golfer who plays on the European Tour. He had an exceptional amateur career; he won the 2021 Panasonic Open on the Japan Golf Tour while still an amateur and was number one in the World Amateur Golf Ranking for a record 87 weeks. He turned professional in 2022, and won three times on the Japan Golf Tour the following year, topping the tour's money list. Nakajima won his first title on the European Tour in 2024.

== Amateur career ==
Nakajima started playing golf at six and had a successful amateur career, winning the 2018 Australian Amateur and the 2021 Japan Amateur Championship, after finishing runner-up at the event in 2015, 2017 and 2019. He was runner-up at the 2017 Duke of York Young Champions Trophy in England and the 2019 Australian Master of the Amateurs. In 2018, he was runner-up at the Asia-Pacific Amateur Championship, before winning the event in 2021 in a playoff with Hong Kong's Taichi Kho. Nakajima became the third Japanese champion of the tournament, joining Hideki Matsuyama and Takumi Kanaya.

He played in a number of representative matches, including the 2017 Nomura Cup, the 2022 Eisenhower Trophy and the 2019 Arnold Palmer Cup, which the international team won 33½–26½ over the American team. Nakajima won both the individual and team gold medals at the 2018 Asian Games. He was world ranked number 1 in the World Amateur Golf Ranking for a record 87 weeks between 2020 and 2022, surpassing Jon Rahm's previous record of 60 weeks. He won the Mark H. McCormack Medal for 2021 and 2022, the first two-time recipient.

While still an amateur, Nakajima played in a number of professional tournaments. In 2021, he was runner-up at the Token Homemate Cup, a stroke behind Takumi Kanaya, and won the Panasonic Open in a playoff. After he made the cut at the 2022 Sony Open in Hawaii, he rose to 188th in the Official World Golf Rankings.

== Professional career ==
Nakajima turned professional in the fall of 2022 and made his professional PGA Tour debut at the 2022 Zozo Championship, where he finished T12.

In 2023, Nakajima won three times on the Japan Golf Tour in his rookie season. He topped the money list, as well as claiming Most Valuable Player and Rookie of the Year honours. By finishing first in the season standings, he earned a card on the European Tour for the 2024 season.

In March 2024, Nakajima claimed his first victory on the European Tour, winning the Hero Indian Open wire-to-wire by four shots.

Nakajima finished runner-up at the Porsche Singapore Classic in March 2025, one stroke behind Richard Mansell. The following week, in his title defense at the Hero Indian Open, Nakajima finished solo-second, two strokes behind Eugenio Chacarra. In October, Nakajima recorded his third runner-up finish of the year, at the DP World India Championship. He held the 54-hole lead and shot a final-round 69, but was overtaken by Tommy Fleetwood, who shot 65.

== Amateur wins ==
- 2016 TrueVisions International Junior Championship, Faldo Series Asia Japan Championship
- 2017 Kanto Amateur Championship
- 2018 Australian Amateur, Asian Games (Men's individual)
- 2021 Japan Amateur Championship, Asia-Pacific Amateur Championship

== Professional wins (5) ==
=== European Tour wins (1) ===
No.	Date	Tournament	Winning score	Margin of victory	Runners-up
1	31 Mar 2024	Hero Indian Open^{1}	−17 (65-65-68-73=271)	4 strokes	(India) Veer Ahlawat, (Sweden) Sebastian Söderberg, (United States) Johannes Veerman

^{1}Co-sanctioned by the Professional Golf Tour of India

=== Japan Golf Tour wins (4) ===
No.	Date	Tournament	Winning score	Margin of victory	Runner-up
1	26 Sep 2021	Panasonic Open (as an amateur)	−18 (69-68-65-68=270)	Playoff	(Japan) Ryutaro Nagano
2	11 Jun 2023	ASO Iizuka Challenged Golf Tournament	−29 (67-64-63-65=259)	Playoff	(Japan) Takumi Kanaya
3	6 Aug 2023	Yokohama Minato Championship	−13 (69-69-67-66=271)	1 stroke	(Japan) Taiga Semikawa
4	5 Nov 2023	Mynavi ABC Championship	−24 (63-69-66-66=264)	3 strokes	(South Africa) Shaun Norris

Japan Golf Tour playoff record (2–1)

No.	Year	Tournament	Opponent	Result
1	2021	Panasonic Open (as an amateur)	(Japan) Ryutaro Nagano	Won with par on first extra hole
2	2023	Gateway to The Open Mizuno Open	(Japan) Kensei Hirata	Lost to birdie on third extra hole
3	2023	ASO Iizuka Challenged Golf Tournament	(Japan) Takumi Kanaya	Won with birdie on second extra hole

== Results in major championships ==
Tournament	2022	2023	2024	2025	2026
Masters Tournament	CUT				
PGA Championship			CUT	CUT	
U.S. Open	CUT				
The Open Championship	CUT	CUT	CUT		CUT

Did not play

CUT = missed the halfway cut

== Team appearances ==
Amateur

- Nomura Cup (representing Japan): 2017
- Junior Golf World Cup (representing Japan): 2018
- Arnold Palmer Cup (representing International team): 2019 (winners)
- Eisenhower Trophy (representing Japan): 2018, 2022

== See also ==
- 2025 Race to Dubai dual card winners
