= Ali Al-Shahrani =

Qatari professional golfer

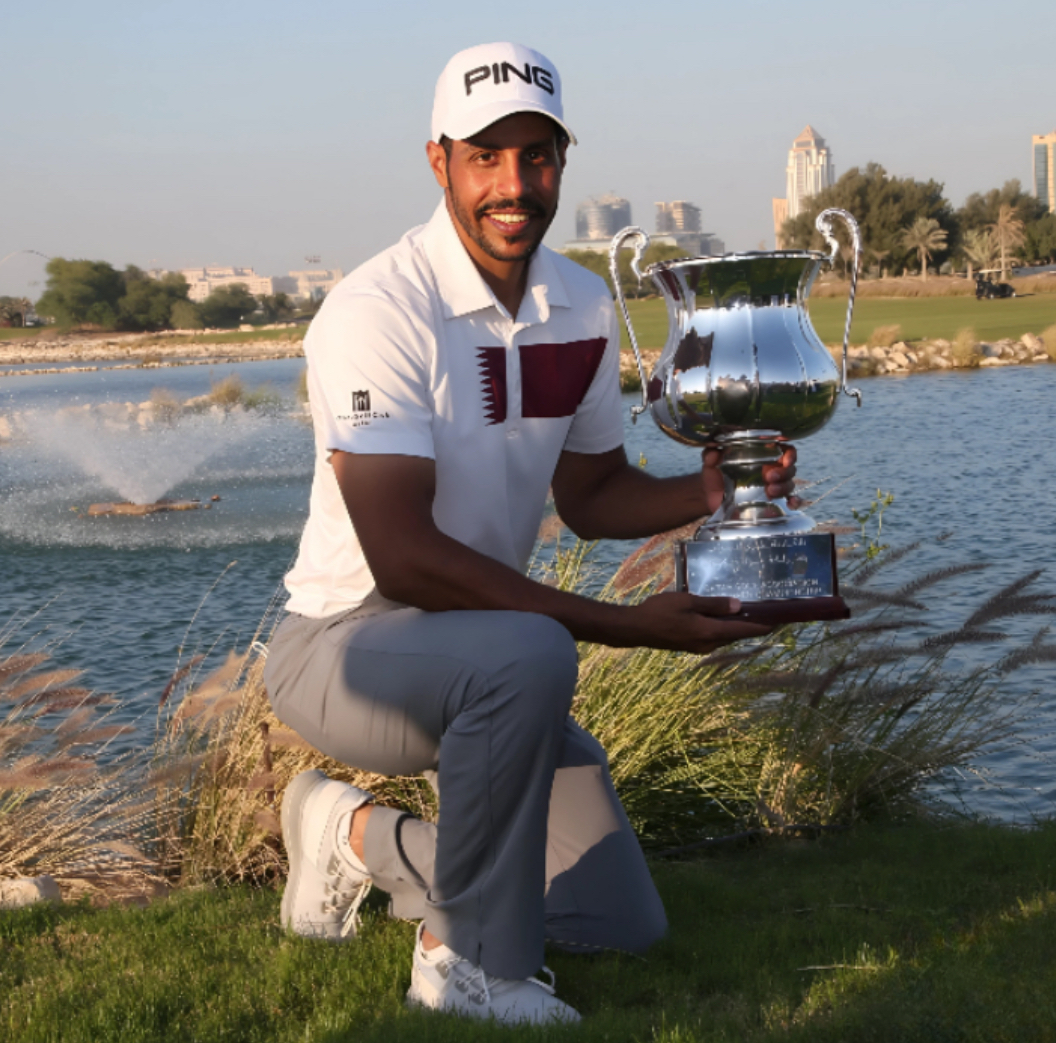

Personal information
- Full name: Ali Abdullah Al-Shahrani
- Nationality: Qatar
- Born: 25 April 1994 (age 32) Doha, Qatar
- Height: 6 ft 0 in (1.83 m)

Career
- Sport: Golf

Ali Abdullah Al-Shahrani (Arabic: علي الشهراني) is a Qatari amateur golfer, considered one of the most prominent golfers in Qatar. In February 2021 he won the Qatar Open Amateur Championship in its thirty-fifth edition, becoming the first Qatari to win the championship in more than three decades.

== Amateur career ==
Al-Shahrani participated in the Qatar Open Amateur Championship, a three-day tournament held at Doha Golf Club, which featured 108 players. He secured first place with a score of 219 (three over par), finishing six shots ahead of Saleh Al-Kaabi and Rowan Jordan, who both tied for second place. The victory was a significant achievement for golf in Qatar, as no Qatari player had won the tournament since its inaugural edition in 1986, held on the sand courses in Dukhan, when Abdullah Al Buainain emerged victorious. Al-Shahrani's win also secured Qatar a third opportunity to participate in the 2021 Commercial Bank Qatar Masters on the European Tour. Later in the year, he finished runner-up in the Saudi Open, five shots behind Saudi Arabian amateur Faisal Salhab.

== Amateur wins ==
- 2021 Qatar Open Amateur Championship

== Team appearances ==
=== Amateur ===
- Eisenhower Trophy (representing Qatar): 2022
